= Joe Webb =

American football player (born 1986)

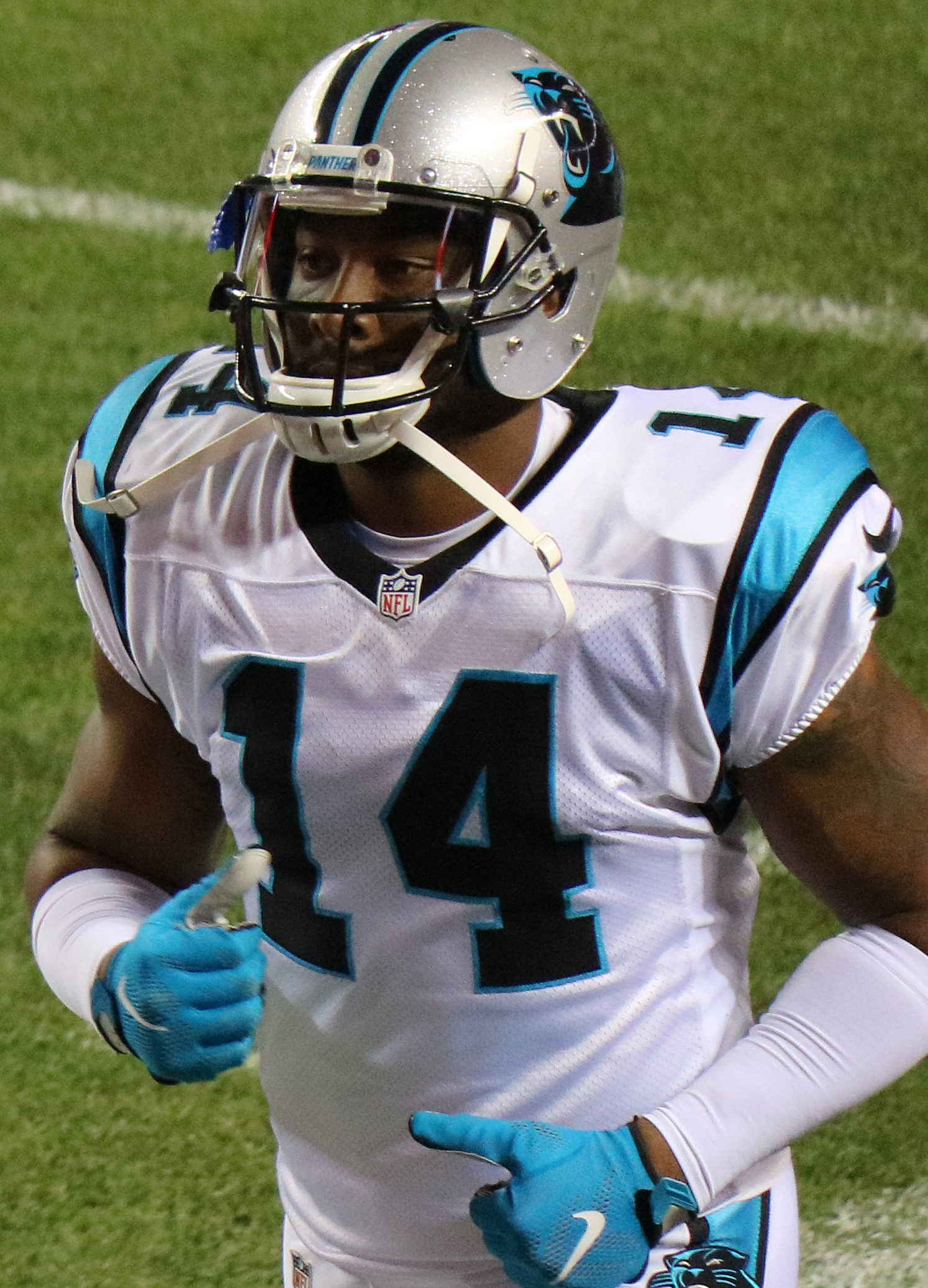
- Webb with the Carolina Panthers in 2016

No. 14, 5, 19
- Positions: Quarterback, wide receiver, kick returner, special teamer

Personal information
- Born: November 14, 1986 (age 40); Birmingham, Alabama, U.S.
- Listed height: 6 ft 4 in (1.93 m)
- Listed weight: 231 lb (105 kg)

Career information
- High school: Wenonah (Birmingham)
- College: UAB (2005–2009)
- NFL draft: 2010: 6th round, 199th overall pick

Career history
- Minnesota Vikings (2010–2013); Carolina Panthers (2014–2016); Buffalo Bills (2017); Houston Texans (2018–2019); Detroit Lions (2020)*; New York Giants (2020)
- * Offseason or practice squad member only

Awards and highlights
- C-USA Offensive Player of the Year (2009); Second-team All-C-USA (2009)

Career NFL statistics
- Passing attempts: 159
- Passing completions: 90
- Completion percentage: 56.6%
- Passing yards: 888
- TD–INT: 3–6
- Passer rating: 63.1
- Receiving yards: 74
- Rushing yards: 326
- Rushing touchdowns: 4
- Return yards: 401
- Stats at Pro Football Reference

Joseph Webb III (born November 14, 1986) is an American former professional football player who was a quarterback, wide receiver, kick returner, and special teamer in the National Football League (NFL). After playing college football for the UAB Blazers, Webb was selected by the Minnesota Vikings in the sixth round of the 2010 NFL draft as a quarterback. He also played for the Carolina Panthers, Buffalo Bills, Houston Texans and New York Giants. Webb holds the NFL record for most tackles by a quarterback with 29.

== Early life ==
Born to Joseph and Wanda Webb, Joe Webb attended Ensley High School from 2001 to 2004. He transferred to Wenonah High School in 2004, where he was named honorable mention Class 5A All-State by the Alabama Sports Writers Association. While attending Wenonah, he led the team to the first round of state playoffs, eventually finishing third in the region. Webb set a school-record at Wenonah for touchdowns in one game, throwing four in a 415-yard passing performance. Webb also played basketball and baseball and was a member of the National Honor Society.

== College career ==
Webb enrolled at UAB in 2005 and was redshirted for the 2005 season under head coach Watson Brown.

In 2006, Webb did not get an opportunity to play until the 11th game at Southern Miss, but he was able to start the final two games of the season. During the season finale at University of Central Florida, he connected on 33-of-51 passes (64.7 percent) for 426 yards with one touchdown pass, a season high for any Blazer quarterback that year.

During the 2007 season, under new head coach Neil Callaway, Webb saw extensive action, playing as a wide receiver, starting seven games and finishing the season with 30 receptions for 459 yards with three touchdown catches.

The 2008 season was Webb's first full season as UAB's quarterback, starting all 12 contests, where he passed the C-USA record for rushing yards by a quarterback in a single season with 1,021 yards. He was also ranked fourth in the nation for rushing yards for a quarterback. He was voted a permanent season team captain by his Blazer teammates at the end of the season. As a junior, Webb became the first player in NCAA history to pass for more than 2,000 yards and rush for 1,000 in consecutive seasons. Webb was ranked in the top 12 nationally of three statistical categories: total offense (5th), rushing (10th) and passing efficiency (12th).

Webb finished his 2009 senior year season with 2,299 passing yards and 1,427 yards on the ground. He was named Conference USA Offensive Player of the Year for 2009.

For his career, Webb had 5,771 passing yards and 2,774 rushing yards for a total of 8,545 offensive yards. He also registered 37 passing touchdowns, 24 rushing touchdowns and four receiving scores. Webb wasn't invited to the 2010 NFL Combine.

Working out as a wide receiver at UAB Pro Day, some of Webb's numbers would have led other wide receivers' at the NFL combine. His vertical jump of 42.5 inches (108 cm) was better than any turned in by a receiver, as was his standing long jump of 11 feet 5.5 inches (3.49 m). Webb's bench press—21 reps at 225 pounds (102 kg)—was the best at his position. Only one other receiver managed 20 reps at the same weight, according to UAB athletic department. Webb also ran the 40-yard dash in 4.43 seconds.

== Professional career ==
Pre-draft measurables
Height	Weight	40-yard dash	10-yard split	20-yard split	20-yard shuttle	Three-cone drill	Vertical jump	Broad jump	Bench press
6 ft 2 3/4 in (1.90 m)	223 lb (101 kg)	4.43 s	1.54 s	2.55 s	4.04 s	6.71 s	42.5 in (1.08 m)	11 ft 5 in (3.48 m)	21 reps
All values from UAB Pro Day

=== Minnesota Vikings ===
==== 2010 season ====
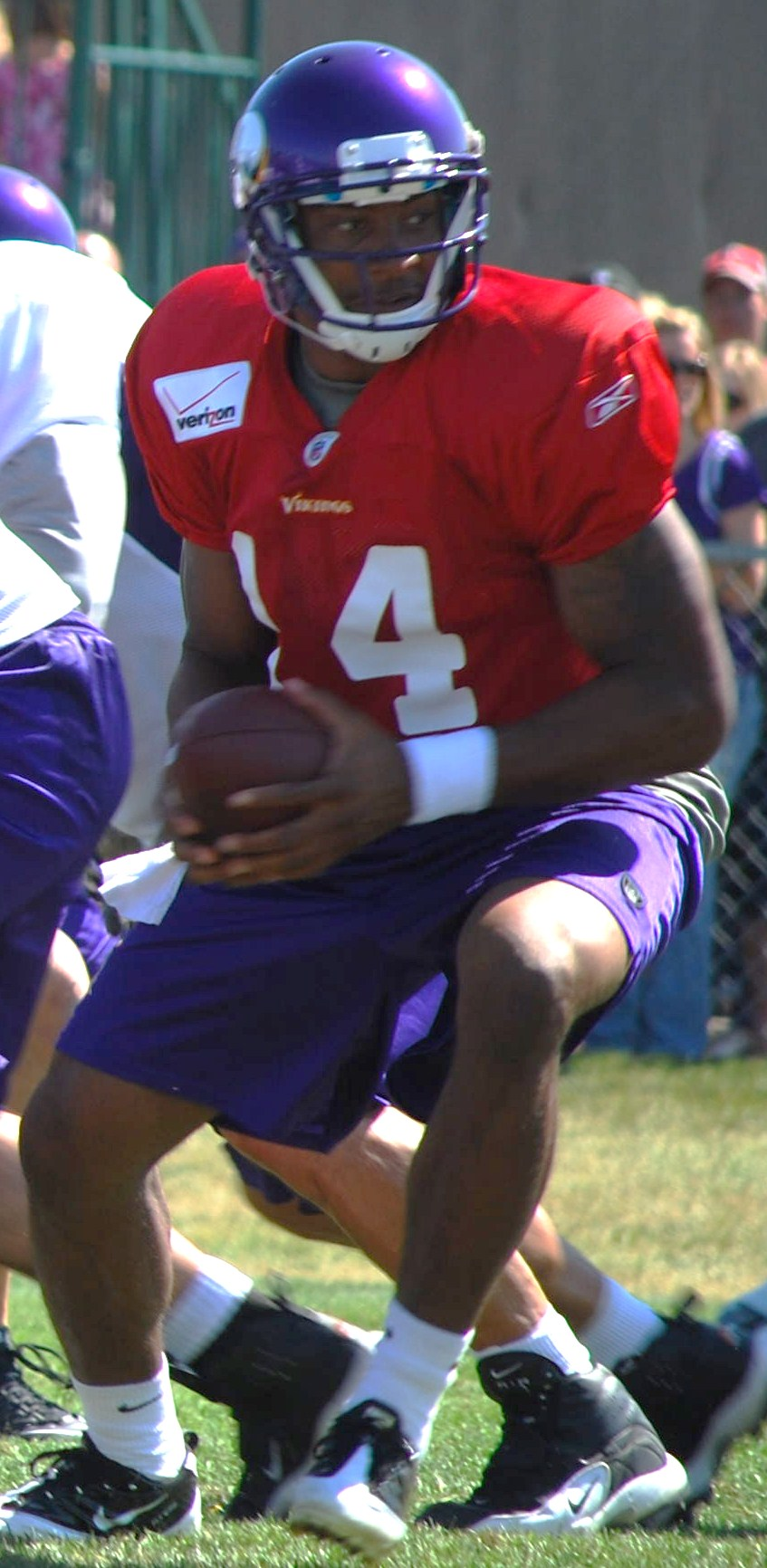
Webb at Vikings training camp in 2011

On April 24, 2010, Webb was selected by the Minnesota Vikings, 199th overall in the sixth round of the 2010 NFL draft. He was originally drafted as a quarterback/wide receiver prospect, but then head coach Brad Childress announced that Webb would exclusively play quarterback for the Vikings.

Webb's National Football League (NFL) debut was against the Buffalo Bills on December 5, 2010. He took the opening kickoff – becoming the first Vikings quarterback to return a kickoff – before leaving the game with a hamstring injury.

Webb made his professional debut at quarterback on December 13, 2010, against the New York Giants. He completed two-of-five attempts for eight yards and also had a 16-yard run.

Webb rushed for his first professional touchdown as quarterback on December 20, 2010, against the Chicago Bears in Minnesota. Filling in for an injured Brett Favre, he completed 15-of-26 passes for 129 yards, with two interceptions; he also had six rushing attempts for 38 yards and a touchdown.

On December 28, 2010, Webb made his first career start, against the Philadelphia Eagles. Scoring one rushing touchdown and throwing for 195 yards, he was 17-of-26 with no interceptions. Initially projected to lose by two touchdowns, the Vikings pulled off an upset win, 24–14. In the regular season finale against the Detroit Lions, he finished with 145 passing yards and an interception in the 20–13 loss.

==== 2011 season ====
During the 2011 season, Webb was used occasionally as part of a "blazer package" specially designed for his unique skillset.

In the Vikings' week 14 game against the Detroit Lions, starting quarterback Christian Ponder was benched early in the third quarter after throwing three interceptions and fumbling once. Webb entered the game with a 31–14 deficit, and proceeded to bring the team back and nearly achieve a victory, throwing his first professional touchdown pass and rushing for 109 yards including a 65-yard touchdown run (a franchise record for quarterbacks, and the longest run of his career). His 109 rushing yards set a franchise record for most rushing yards in a game by a quarterback. Webb's efforts ultimately led to a 1st and goal situation at the one-yard line with nine seconds in the game and a score of 34–28. On the final play, Webb fumbled the ball ending the game.

On December 24, 2011, against the Washington Redskins, Webb came in after Ponder left the game with a concussion. Webb was 4-of-5 for 84 yards and two touchdowns for a perfect 158.3 passer rating; he rushed for another touchdown. He led the team to a 33–26 victory at Washington.

Overall, in the 2011 season, Webb finished with 376 passing yards, three passing touchdowns, two interceptions, 154 rushing yards, and two rushing touchdowns.

==== 2012 season ====
During the 2012 season, Webb had his roles limited as he was not used as a quarterback in the regular season. On January 5, 2013, Webb was named the starting quarterback for the Vikings' Wild Card Round game against the Green Bay Packers after Christian Ponder was sidelined with an elbow injury. Webb finished with 11 completions on 30 attempts with 180 passing yards and one touchdown in a losing effort.

==== 2013 season ====
With the signing of Matt Cassel on March 14, Vikings coach Leslie Frazier mentioned that Webb may be given consideration to play other positions besides quarterback. "(Webb) is such a talented athlete that we want to make sure that we're doing the right thing by him and our team, as well." said Frazier, "That's something we'll continue to discuss as we go forward." It was confirmed on May 15 that Webb had been informed of his switch to wide receiver. Frazier showed interest in having Webb play quarterback again when Josh Freeman and Christian Ponder were injured. Webb later said in a press conference that he had no desire to play quarterback again for the Vikings. In 2013, Webb caught five passes for 33 yards.

=== Carolina Panthers ===
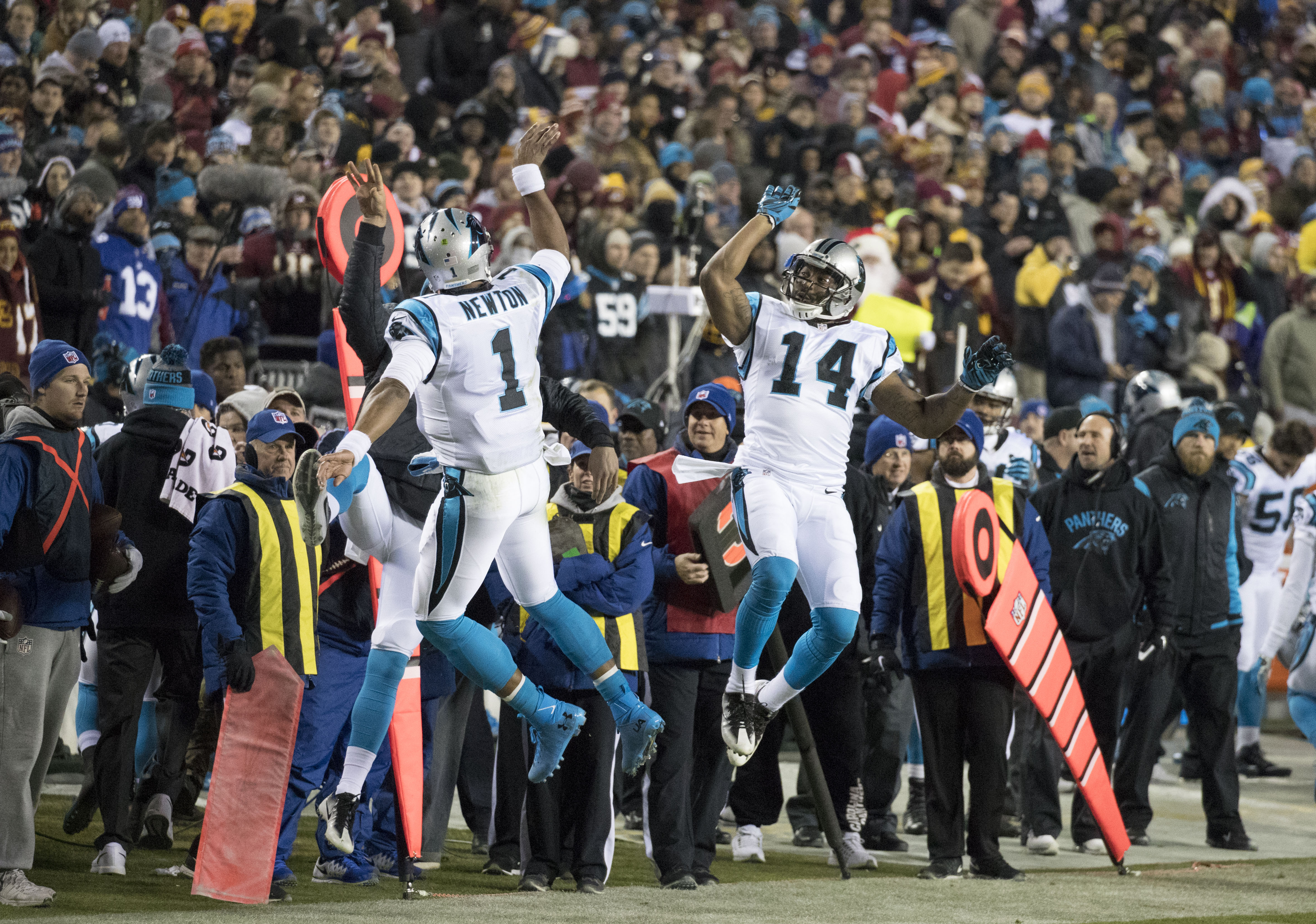
Webb and Cam Newton in 2016

On March 21, 2014, Webb signed with the Carolina Panthers. Even though he previously said in 2013 that he had no intention of playing as a quarterback again, he was the third-string quarterback on the Panthers depth chart. However, he did not throw a pass while with Panthers, but was occasionally used as a wide receiver. However, his predominant role with the Panthers was returning kickoffs.

In the 2015 season, Webb continued his role as a kick returner for the Panthers. On January 3, 2016, against the Tampa Bay Buccaneers, Webb recovered Buccaneer Bobby Rainey's fumble. On February 7, Webb was part of the Panthers team that played in Super Bowl 50. In the game, he was the team's kick returner as the Panthers fell to the Denver Broncos by a score of 24–10.

On September 2, 2017, Webb was released by the Panthers.

=== Buffalo Bills ===
On September 4, 2017, Webb was signed by the Buffalo Bills. Webb played in the wildcat formation and on special teams for the Bills throughout the 2017 season. He also played as quarterback in the third quarter, fourth quarter and overtime of a snowy game against the Indianapolis Colts on December 10 after Nathan Peterman suffered a concussion. The Bills won in overtime by a score of 13–7.

=== Houston Texans ===
On April 5, 2018, Webb signed with the Houston Texans. Webb was cut by the team on September 1, but was re-signed the next day with a one-year, $915,000 contract.

On March 21, 2019, Webb re-signed with the Texans. On August 31, Webb was placed on injured reserve.

=== Detroit Lions ===
On September 23, 2020, Webb was signed to the Detroit Lions practice squad as a wide receiver. He was released on October 20.

=== New York Giants ===
On December 8, 2020, Webb was signed to the New York Giants' practice squad. On December 19, Webb was promoted to the active roster. On January 2, 2021, Webb was waived by the Giants, and signed a reserve/future contract with the team six days later. On May 18, Webb was released by the Giants.

== Career statistics ==
=== NFL ===
==== Regular season ====
Year	Team	Games			Passing										Rushing				Receiving				Kick return				Fumbles (Note: Fumbles lost data taken from Pro Football Reference career game log)		Tackles	
Year	Team	GP	GS	Record	Cmp	Att	Pct	Yds	Avg	TD	Int	Rtg	Sck	SckY	Att	Yds	Avg	TD	Rec	Yds	Avg	TD	Ret	Yds	Avg	TD	Fum	Lost	Solo	Ast
2010	MIN	5	2	1–1	54	89	60.7	477	5.4	0	3	60.9	8	48	18	120	6.7	2	0	0	0.0	0	1	30	30.0	0	1	0	0	0
2011	MIN	11	1	0–0	34	63	54.0	376	6.0	3	2	74.6	3	21	22	154	7.0	2	1	9	9.0	0	0	0	0.0	0	1	1	0	0
2012	MIN	1	0	0–0	0	0	0.0	0	0.0	0	0	0.0	0	0	1	−1	−1.0	0	0	0	0.0	0	0	0	0.0	0	0	0	0	0
2013	MIN	16	1	0–0	0	0	0.0	0	0.0	0	0	0.0	0	0	0	0	0.0	0	5	33	6.6	0	1	9	9.0	0	0	0	2	0
2014	CAR	7	0	0–0	0	0	0.0	0	0.0	0	0	0.0	0	0	0	0	0.0	0	1	16	16.0	0	2	53	26.5	0	0	0	1	0
2015	CAR	16	0	0–0	0	0	0.0	0	0.0	0	0	0.0	0	0	1	−1	−1.0	0	0	0	0.0	0	8	178	22.3	0	0	0	7	1
2016	CAR	14	0	0–0	0	0	0.0	0	0.0	0	0	0.0	0	0	0	0	0.0	0	1	3	3.0	0	6	131	21.8	0	0	0	6	0
2017	BUF	16	0	0–0	2	7	28.6	35	5.0	0	1	8.3	0	0	8	54	6.8	0	0	0	0.0	0	0	0	0.0	0	0	0	4	4
2018	HOU	16	0	0–0	0	0	0.0	0	0.0	0	0	0.0	0	0	0	0	0.0	0	2	13	6.5	0	0	0	0.0	0	0	0	3	0
2020	NYG	2	0	0–0	0	0	0.0	0	0.0	0	0	0.0	0	0	0	0	0.0	0	0	0	0.0	0	0	0	0.0	0	0	0	1	0
Career		104	4	1–1	90	159	56.6	888	5.6	3	6	63.1	11	69	50	326	6.5	4	10	74	7.6	0	18	401	22.3	0	2	1	24	5

==== Playoffs ====
Year	Team	Games			Passing										Rushing				Receiving				Kick return				Fumbles		Tackles	
Year	Team	GP	GS	Record	Cmp	Att	Pct	Yds	Avg	TD	Int	Rtg	Sck	SckY	Att	Yds	Avg	TD	Rec	Yds	Avg	TD	Ret	Yds	Avg	TD	Fum	Lost	Solo	Ast
2012	MIN	1	1	0–1	11	30	36.7	180	6.0	1	1	54.9	3	23	7	68	9.7	0	0	0	0.0	0	0	0	0.0	0	1	1	0	0
2014	CAR	2	0	0–0	0	0	0.0	0	0.0	0	0	0.0	0	0	0	0	0.0	0	0	0	0.0	0	0	0	0.0	0	0	0	1	0
2015	CAR	3	0	0–0	0	0	0.0	0	0.0	0	0	0.0	0	0	0	0	0.0	0	0	0	0.0	0	5	83	16.6	0	0	0	3	0
2017	BUF	1	0	0–0	0	0	0.0	0	0.0	0	0	0.0	0	0	0	0	0.0	0	0	0	0.0	0	0	0	0.0	0	0	0	0	0
2018	HOU	1	0	0–0	0	0	0.0	0	0.0	0	0	0.0	0	0	0	0	0.0	0	0	0	0.0	0	0	0	0.0	0	0	0	0	0
Career		8	1	0–1	11	30	36.7	180	6.0	1	1	54.9	3	23	7	68	9.7	0	0	0	0.0	0	5	83	16.6	0	1	1	4	0

=== College ===
Season	Team	Passing								Rushing				Receiving			
Season	Team	Cmp	Att	Pct	Yds	Y/A	TD	Int	Rtg	Att	Yds	Avg	TD	Rec	Yds	Avg	TD
2006	UAB	33	51	64.7	426	8.4	1	0	141.3	24	38	1.6	1	0	0	0.0	0
2007	UAB	65	117	55.6	679	5.8	5	1	116.7	67	288	4.3	1	30	459	15.3	3
2008	UAB	208	353	58.9	2,367	6.7	10	16	115.5	198	1,021	5.2	11	0	0	0.0	0
2009	UAB	162	271	59.8	2,299	8.5	21	8	150.7	227	1,427	6.3	11	2	12	6.0	1
Career		468	792	59.1	5,771	7.3	37	25	129.4	516	2,774	5.4	24	32	471	14.7	4

== Boxing ==
Webb made his professional boxing debut at Bartow Arena on Saturday, August 5, 2023. It resulted in a majority draw.
