= 2006 East Carolina Pirates football team =

American college football season

2006 East Carolina Pirates football

PapaJohns.com Bowl, L 7–24 vs. South Florida
- Conference: Conference USA
- East
- Record: 7–6 (5–3 C-USA)
- Head coach: Skip Holtz (2nd season)
- Offensive coordinator: Steve Shankweiler (2nd season)
- Offensive scheme: Multiple
- Defensive coordinator: Greg Hudson (2nd season)
- Base defense: 4–3
- Home stadium: Dowdy–Ficklen Stadium

2006 Conference USA football standings
	Conf.			Overall
Team	W		L	W		L
East Division
Southern Miss x	6	–	2	9	–	5
East Carolina	5	–	3	7	–	6
Marshall	4	–	4	5	–	7
UCF	3	–	5	4	–	8
UAB	2	–	6	3	–	9
Memphis	1	–	7	2	–	10
West Division
Houston x$	7	–	1	10	–	4
Rice	6	–	2	7	–	6
Tulsa	5	–	3	8	–	5
SMU	4	–	4	6	–	6
UTEP	3	–	5	5	–	7
Tulane	2	–	6	4	–	8
Championship: Houston 34, Southern Miss 20
$ – Conference champion; x – Division champion/co-champions; Rankings from AP Poll

The 2006 East Carolina Pirates football team was an American football team that represented East Carolina University as a member of Conference USA during the 2006 NCAA Division I-A football season. In their second season under head coach Skip Holtz, the team compiled a 7–6 record and were defeated by South Florida in the PapaJohns.com Bowl.

== Schedule ==
Date	Time	Opponent	Site	TV	Result	Attendance	Source
September 2	5:30pm	at Navy*	Navy–Marine Corps Memorial Stadium; Annapolis, MD	CSTV	L 23–28	33,809	
September 9	7:00pm	at UAB	Legion Field; Birmingham, AL		L 12–17	23,116	
September 16	7:00pm	Memphis	Dowdy–Ficklen Stadium; Greenville, NC		W 35–20	37,431	
September 23	4:30pm	No. 4 West Virginia*	Dowdy–Ficklen Stadium; Greenville, NC	ESPN2	L 10–27	40,510	
October 7	6:00pm	Virginia*	Dowdy–Ficklen Stadium; Greenville, NC	CSTV	W 31–21	35,541	
October 14	3:00pm	Tulsa	Dowdy–Ficklen Stadium; Greenville, NC		L 10–31	34,011	
October 21	3:00pm	SMU^{†}	Dowdy–Ficklen Stadium; Greenville, NC		W 38–21	34,141	
October 28	7:30pm	at Southern Miss	M. M. Roberts Stadium; Hattiesburg, MS	CSTV	W 20–17 ^{OT}	25,155	
November 4	4:00pm	at UCF	Florida Citrus Bowl; Orlando, FL		W 23–10	31,414	
November 11	1:00pm	Marshall	Dowdy–Ficklen Stadium; Greenville, NC (rivalry)		W 33–20	41,372	
November 18	3:00pm	at Rice	Rice Stadium; Houston, TX		L 17–18	12,669	
November 25	7:00pm	at NC State*	Carter–Finley Stadium; Raleigh, NC (rivalry)	ESPNU	W 21–16	54,264	
December 23	12:00pm	vs. South Florida*	Legion Field; Birmingham, AL (PapaJohns.com Bowl)	ESPN2	L 7–24	32,023	
*Non-conference game; ^{†}Homecoming; Rankings from AP Poll released prior to the game; All times are in Eastern time
