= 2006 Houston Cougars football team =

American college football season

2006 Houston Cougars football

C-USA champion C-USA West Division champion

C-USA Championship Game, W 34–20 vs. Southern Miss

Liberty Bowl, L 36–44 vs. South Carolina
- Conference: Conference USA
- West Division
- Record: 10–4 (7–1 C-USA)
- Head coach: Art Briles (4th season)
- Offensive scheme: Veer and shoot
- Defensive coordinator: Alan Weddell (1st season)
- Base defense: 4–3
- Captain: Game captains
- Home stadium: Robertson Stadium

2006 Conference USA football standings
	Conf.			Overall
Team	W		L	W		L
East Division
Southern Miss x	6	–	2	9	–	5
East Carolina	5	–	3	7	–	6
Marshall	4	–	4	5	–	7
UCF	3	–	5	4	–	8
UAB	2	–	6	3	–	9
Memphis	1	–	7	2	–	10
West Division
Houston x$	7	–	1	10	–	4
Rice	6	–	2	7	–	6
Tulsa	5	–	3	8	–	5
SMU	4	–	4	6	–	6
UTEP	3	–	5	5	–	7
Tulane	2	–	6	4	–	8
Championship: Houston 34, Southern Miss 20
$ – Conference champion; x – Division champion/co-champions; Rankings from AP Poll

The 2006 Houston Cougars football team represented the University of Houston as a member of Conference USA (C-USA) during the 2006 NCAA Division I FBS football season. Led by fourth-year head coach Art Briles, the Cougars compiled an overall record of 10–4 with a mark of 7–1 in conference play, winning C-USA's West Division title. Houston advanced to the Conference USA Championship Game, defeating was Southern Miss. The Cougars concluded the season at the invited to the Liberty Bowl, losing to South Carolina. The team played home games on campus, at Robertson Stadium in Houston.

== Schedule ==
Date	Time	Opponent	Site	TV	Result	Attendance	Source
September 2	8:00 pm	at Rice	Rice Stadium; Houston, TX (rivalry)	CSTV	W 31–30	23,352	
September 9	6:00 pm	Tulane	Robertson Stadium; Houston, TX		W 45–7	16,506	
September 16	6:00 pm	Grambling State*	Robertson Stadium; Houston, TX		W 42–22	27,302	
September 23	8:00 pm	Oklahoma State*	Robertson Stadium; Houston, TX	CSTV	W 34–25	28,260	
September 30	5:00 pm	at Miami (FL)*	Miami Orange Bowl; Miami, FL	ESPN2	L 13–14	36,107	
October 7	6:00 pm	Louisiana–Lafayette*	Robertson Stadium; Houston, TX		L 28–31	17,543	
October 14	6:00 pm	at Southern Miss	M. M. Roberts Stadium; Hattiesburg, MS		L 27–31	32,317	
October 21	6:00 pm	UTEP	Robertson Stadium; Houston, TX		W 34–17	18,154	
October 28	2:30 pm	UCF	Robertson Stadium; Houston, TX	CSTV	W 51–31	13,242	
November 4	2:30 pm	Tulsa^{†}	Robertson Stadium; Houston, TX	CSTV	W 27–10	22,452	
November 11	2:00 pm	at SMU	Gerald J. Ford Stadium; University Park, TX (rivalry)		W 37–27	20,350	
November 18	1:00 pm	at Memphis	Liberty Bowl Memorial Stadium; Memphis, TN		W 23–20 ^{OT}	20,344	
December 1	7:00 pm	Southern Miss	Robertson Stadium; Houston, TX (C-USA Championship Game)	ESPN	W 34–20	31,818	
December 29	3:30 pm	vs. South Carolina*	Liberty Bowl Memorial Stadium; Memphis, TN (Liberty Bowl)	ESPN	L 36–44	56,103	
*Non-conference game; ^{†}Homecoming; All times are in Central time

== Game summaries ==
=== Rice ===
Team	1	2	3	4	Total
• Houston	14	0	3	14	31
Rice	0	27	3	0	30

- Date: September 2
- Location: Rice Stadium, Houston, Texas
- Game start: 9:00 p.m. EST

Scoring summary
Q1	12:20	HOU	Jeron Harvey 6 yard pass from Kevin Kolb (T.J. Lawrence kick)	HOU 7–0
Q1	2:25	HOU	Jackie Battle 7 yard run (T.J. Lawrence kick)	HOU 14–0
Q2	14:47	RICE	Jarrett Dillard 13 yard pass from Chase Clement (Luke Juist kick)	HOU 14–7
Q2	10:42	RICE	Quinton Smith 80 yard pass from Chase Clement (Luke Juist kick)	Tie 14–14
Q2	6:40	RICE	Quinton Smith 7 yard run (Luke Juist kick)	RICE 21–14
Q2	:21	RICE	Quinton Smith 1 yard run (kick blocked)	RICE 27–14
Q3	6:19	RICE	Luke Juist 44 yard field goal	RICE 30–14
Q3	2:04	HOU	T.J. Lawrence 20 yard field goal	RICE 30–17
Q4	13:41	HOU	Vincent Marshall 8 yard pass from Kevin Kolb (T.J. Lawrence kick)	RICE 30–24
Q4	10:28	HOU	Anthony Alridge 8 yard pass from Kevin Kolb (T.J. Lawrence kick)	HOU 31–30
