= 2006 Pittsburgh Panthers football team =

American college football season

2006 Pittsburgh Panthers football
- Conference: Big East Conference
- Record: 6–6 (2–5 Big East)
- Head coach: Dave Wannstedt (2nd season)
- Offensive coordinator: Matt Cavanaugh (2nd season)
- Offensive scheme: Pro-style
- Defensive coordinator: Paul Rhoads (7th season)
- Base defense: 4–3
- Home stadium: Heinz Field

2006 Big East Conference football standings
| | Conf. | | | Overall |
| Team | W | | L | W | | L |
|---|---|---|---|---|---|---|
| No. 6 Louisville $ | 6 | – | 1 | 12 | – | 1 |
| No. 10 West Virginia | 5 | – | 2 | 11 | – | 2 |
| No. 12 Rutgers | 5 | – | 2 | 11 | – | 2 |
| South Florida | 4 | – | 3 | 9 | – | 4 |
| Cincinnati | 4 | – | 3 | 8 | – | 5 |
| Pittsburgh | 2 | – | 5 | 6 | – | 6 |
| Connecticut | 1 | – | 6 | 4 | – | 8 |
| Syracuse | 1 | – | 6 | 4 | – | 8 |
$ – BCS representative as conference champion; Rankings from AP Poll

The 2006 Pittsburgh Panthers football team represented the University of Pittsburgh in the 2006 NCAA Division I FBS football season.

== Schedule ==
| Date | Time | Opponent | Site | TV | Result | Attendance |
|---|---|---|---|---|---|---|
| September 2 | 7:00 p.m. | Virginia* | Heinz Field; Pittsburgh, PA | ESPNU | W 38–13 | 46,758 |
| September 8 | 8:00 p.m. | at Cincinnati | Nippert Stadium; Cincinnati, OH (River City Rivalry) | ESPN2 | W 33–15 | 20,611 |
| September 16 | 12:00 p.m. | Michigan State* | Heinz Field; Pittsburgh, PA | ABC | L 23–38 | 47,956 |
| September 23 | 1:30 p.m. | The Citadel* | Heinz Field; Pittsburgh, PA | ESPN360 | W 51–6 | 30,069 |
| September 30 | 12:00 p.m. | Toledo* | Heinz Field; Pittsburgh, PA | ESPNU | W 45–3 | 31,212 |
| October 7 | 12:00 p.m. | at Syracuse | Carrier Dome; Syracuse, NY (rivalry) | ESPN+ | W 21–11 | 41,870 |
| October 13 | 8:00 p.m. | at UCF* | Florida Citrus Bowl; Orlando, FL | ESPN | W 52–7 | 35,858 |
| October 21 | 5:45 p.m. | No. 15 Rutgers^{†} | Heinz Field; Pittsburgh, PA | ESPN2 | L 10–20 | 49,620 |
| November 4 | 12:00 p.m. | at South Florida | Raymond James Stadium; Tampa, FL | ESPN+ | L 12–22 | 35,671 |
| November 11 | 12:00 p.m. | at Connecticut | Rentschler Field; East Hartford, CT | ESPN+ | L 45–46 ^{2OT} | 40,000 |
| November 16 | 7:30 p.m. | No. 8 West Virginia | Heinz Field; Pittsburgh, PA (Backyard Brawl) | ESPN | L 27–45 | 55,642 |
| November 25 | 3:30 p.m. | No. 8 Louisville | Heinz Field; Pittsburgh, PA | ESPN | L 24–48 | 41,881 |
*Non-conference game; ^{†}Homecoming; Rankings from AP Poll released prior to the game; All times are in Eastern time

== Coaching staff ==
2006 Pittsburgh Panthers football staff
| Coaching staff: Dave Wannstedt – Head coach; Bob Junko – Assistant head coach/recruiting coordinator; Matt Cavanaugh – Offensive coordinator/quarterbacks; Paul Rhoads – Defensive coordinator/secondary; Curtis Bray – Linebackers; Paul Dunn – Offensive line; Greg Gattuso – Defensive line; Aubrey Hill – Receivers; Charlie Partridge – Defensive line/special teams; David Walker – Running backs | Support staff: Chris LaSala – Assistant Athletic Director/football operations; Mike Antonoplos – Student-athlete development coordinator; Brian Angelichio – Offensive graduate assistant/tight ends; Jeff Hafley – Defensive graduate assistant/secondary | Strength and conditioning staff: Mike Kent – Strength and conditioning coach; Darren Honeycutt – Assistant strength and conditioning coach |

== Team players drafted into the NFL ==
| Player | Position | Round | Pick | NFL club |
| Darrelle Revis | Defensive back | 1 | 14 | New York Jets |
| Clint Session | Linebacker | 4 | 136 | Indianapolis Colts |
| H. B. Blades | Linebacker | 6 | 179 | Washington Redskins |
