= 2006 Conference USA Football Championship Game =

- Conference Championship
| Southern Miss Golden Eagles | Houston Cougars |
| (8–4) | (9–3) |
| 20 | 34 |
| Head coach: Jeff Bower | Head coach: Art Briles |
| | 1 | 2 | 3 | 4 | Total |
|---|---|---|---|---|---|
| Southern Miss | 10 | 7 | 0 | 3 | 20 |
| Houston | 7 | 6 | 14 | 7 | 34 |
- Date: December 1, 2006
- Season: 2006
- Stadium: Robertson Stadium
- Location: Houston, Texas
- MVP: Vincent Marshall (WR, HOU)
- Favorite: Houston by 5
- Referee: Barry Anderson
- Attendance: 31,818

United States TV coverage
- Network: ESPN2
- Announcers: Dave Pasch (play-by-play), Rod Gilmore (analyst), Trevor Matich (analyst) and Dave Ryan (sideline)

2006 Conference USA football standings
| | Conf. | | | Overall |
| Team | W | | L | W | | L |
|---|---|---|---|---|---|---|
East Division
| Southern Miss x | 6 | – | 2 | 9 | – | 5 |
| East Carolina | 5 | – | 3 | 7 | – | 6 |
| Marshall | 4 | – | 4 | 5 | – | 7 |
| UCF | 3 | – | 5 | 4 | – | 8 |
| UAB | 2 | – | 6 | 3 | – | 9 |
| Memphis | 1 | – | 7 | 2 | – | 10 |
West Division
| Houston x$ | 7 | – | 1 | 10 | – | 4 |
| Rice | 6 | – | 2 | 7 | – | 6 |
| Tulsa | 5 | – | 3 | 8 | – | 5 |
| SMU | 4 | – | 4 | 6 | – | 6 |
| UTEP | 3 | – | 5 | 5 | – | 7 |
| Tulane | 2 | – | 6 | 4 | – | 8 |
Championship: Houston 34, Southern Miss 20
$ – Conference champion; x – Division champion/co-champions; Rankings from AP Poll

The 2006 Conference USA Football Championship Game was played on December 1, 2006 at Robertson Stadium in Houston to determine the 2006 football champion of the Conference USA (C-USA). The game featured the Southern Miss Golden Eagles, the East Division champions, and the Houston Cougars, the West Division champions. The game kicked off at 8:00pm EST and was televised by ESPN2.

== Game summary ==
With the win, the Houston Cougars won the second-ever Conference USA championship game and grabbed their first Conference championship since 1996.

== Scoring summary ==
Scoring summary

| Quarter | Time | Drive | | | Team | Scoring information | Score | |
| Quarter | Time | Plays | Yards | TOP | Team | Scoring information | Southern Miss | Houston |
|---|---|---|---|---|---|---|---|---|
| "TOP" = time of possession. For other American football terms, see Glossary of American football. | | | | | | | 20 | 34 |
