= 2006 Cincinnati Bearcats football team =

American college football season

2006 Cincinnati Bearcats football

International Bowl champion

International Bowl, W 27–24 vs. Western Michigan
- Conference: Big East Conference
- Record: 8–5 (4–3 Big East)
- Head coach: Mark Dantonio (3rd season; regular season); Brian Kelly (bowl game)
- Offensive coordinator: Don Treadwell (3rd season)
- Offensive scheme: Multiple
- Defensive coordinator: Pat Narduzzi (3rd season)
- Base defense: 4–3
- Home stadium: Nippert Stadium

2006 Big East Conference football standings
	Conf.			Overall
Team	W		L	W		L
No. 6 Louisville $	6	–	1	12	–	1
No. 10 West Virginia	5	–	2	11	–	2
No. 12 Rutgers	5	–	2	11	–	2
South Florida	4	–	3	9	–	4
Cincinnati	4	–	3	8	–	5
Pittsburgh	2	–	5	6	–	6
Connecticut	1	–	6	4	–	8
Syracuse	1	–	6	4	–	8
$ – BCS representative as conference champion; Rankings from AP Poll

The 2006 Cincinnati Bearcats football team represented the University of Cincinnati in the 2006 NCAA Division I FBS football season. The team, coached by Mark Dantonio, played its home games in Nippert Stadium, as it has since 1923. This was Dantonio's last season with the Bearcats as he became head coach of Michigan State.

== Schedule ==
Date	Time	Opponent	Site	TV	Result	Attendance
September 2	7:30 pm	Eastern Kentucky*	Nippert Stadium; Cincinnati, OH		W 31–0	18,792
September 8	8:00 pm	Pittsburgh	Nippert Stadium; Cincinnati, OH	ESPN2	L 15–33	20,611
September 16	12:00 pm	at No. 1 Ohio State*	Ohio Stadium; Columbus, OH	ESPN Plus	L 7–37	105,037
September 23	12:00 pm	at No. 11 Virginia Tech*	Lane Stadium; Blacksburg, VA	ESPNU	L 13–29	66,233
September 30	3:30 pm	Miami (OH)*	Nippert Stadium; Cincinnati, OH (Victory Bell)		W 24–10	21,248
October 7	3:30 pm	Akron*	Nippert Stadium; Cincinnati, OH	ESPN360	W 20–14	18,123
October 14	3:30 pm	at No. 7 Louisville	Papa John's Cardinal Stadium; Louisville, KY (The Keg of Nails)	ESPNU	L 17–24	41,549
October 22	8:00 pm	South Florida	Nippert Stadium; Cincinnati, OH	ESPN	W 23–6	15,889
October 28	12:00 pm	Syracuse^{†}	Nippert Stadium; Cincinnati, OH	ESPN Plus	W 17–3	20,146
November 11	12:00 pm	at No. 10 West Virginia	Milan Puskar Stadium; Morgantown, WV	ESPN2	L 24–42	57,174
November 18	7:45 pm	No. 7 Rutgers	Nippert Stadium; Cincinnati, OH	ESPN	W 30–11	27,804
November 25	12:00 pm	at Connecticut	Rentschler Field; East Hartford, CT	ESPN Plus	W 26–23	37,515
January 6	12:00 pm	vs. Western Michigan*	Rogers Centre; Toronto, ON (International Bowl)	ESPN2	W 27–24	26,717
*Non-conference game; ^{†}Homecoming; Rankings from AP Poll released prior to the game; All times are in Eastern time

== Awards and milestones ==
=== Big East Conference honors ===
==== Offensive player of the week ====
- Week 9: Dustin Grutza

==== Defensive player of the week ====
- Week 8: Kevin McCullough
- Week 12: DeAngelo Smith

==== Big East Conference All-Conference First Team ====
- Terrill Byrd, DL
- Kevin McCullough, LB
- Dominic Ross, DB

==== Big East Conference All-Conference Second Team ====
- Brent Celek, TE
- Trevor Canfield, OL
- Mike Mickens, DB

== Players in the 2007 NFL draft ==
Player	Position	Round	Pick	NFL club
John Bowie	CB	4	110	Oakland Raiders
Brent Celek	TE	5	162	Philadelphia Eagles
