= 2006 SMU Mustangs football team =

American college football season

2006 SMU Mustangs football
- Conference: Conference USA
- West Division
- Record: 6–6 (4–4 C-USA)
- Head coach: Phil Bennett (5th season)
- Offensive coordinator: Rusty Burns (3rd season)
- Offensive scheme: Spread
- Defensive coordinator: Jim Gush (5th season)
- Base defense: 4–3
- Home stadium: Gerald J. Ford Stadium

2006 Conference USA football standings
	Conf.			Overall
Team	W		L	W		L
East Division
Southern Miss x	6	–	2	9	–	5
East Carolina	5	–	3	7	–	6
Marshall	4	–	4	5	–	7
UCF	3	–	5	4	–	8
UAB	2	–	6	3	–	9
Memphis	1	–	7	2	–	10
West Division
Houston x$	7	–	1	10	–	4
Rice	6	–	2	7	–	6
Tulsa	5	–	3	8	–	5
SMU	4	–	4	6	–	6
UTEP	3	–	5	5	–	7
Tulane	2	–	6	4	–	8
Championship: Houston 34, Southern Miss 20
$ – Conference champion; x – Division champion/co-champions; Rankings from AP Poll

The 2006 SMU Mustangs football team represented Southern Methodist University (SMU) as a member the West Division of Conference USA (C-USA) during the 2006 NCAA Division I FBS football season. Led by fifth-year head coach Phil Bennett, the Mustangs compiled an overall record of 6–6 with a mark of 4–4 in conference play, placing fourth in C-USA's West Division.

== Schedule ==
Date	Time	Opponent	Site	TV	Result	Attendance	Source
September 2	6:00 p.m.	at No. 25 Texas Tech*	Jones AT&T Stadium; Lubbock, TX		L 3–35	50,362	
September 9	6:00 p.m.	at North Texas*	Fouts Field; Denton, TX (Safeway Bowl)		L 6–24	25,231	
September 16	7:00 p.m.	Sam Houston State*	Gerald J. Ford Stadium; University Park, TX (rivalry)		W 45–14	17,421	
September 23	7:00 p.m.	Arkansas State*	Gerald J. Ford Stadium; University Park, TX		W 55–9	12,979	
September 30	6:30 p.m.	at Tulane	Louisiana Superdome; New Orleans, LA	CSTV	W 33–28	21,565	
October 7	8:05 p.m.	at UTEP	Sun Bowl Stadium; El Paso, TX		L 21–24	41,258	
October 14	2:00 p.m.	Marshall	Gerald J. Ford Stadium; University Park, TX		W 31–21	14,032	
October 21	2:00 p.m.	at East Carolina	Dowdy–Ficklen Stadium; Greenville, NC		L 21–38	34,141	
October 31	6:30 p.m.	UAB	Gerald J. Ford Stadium; University Park, TX	ESPN2	W 22–9	13,125	
November 11	2:00 p.m.	Houston^{†}	Gerald J. Ford Stadium; University Park, TX		L 27–37	20,350	
November 18	2:00 p.m.	Tulsa	Gerald J. Ford Stadium; University Park, TX		W 34–24	14,658	
November 25	2:00 p.m.	at Rice	Rice Stadium; Houston, TX (rivalry)		L 27–31	12,867	
*Non-conference game; ^{†}Homecoming; Rankings from AP Poll released prior to the game; All times are in Central time

== Roster ==
2006 SMU Mustangs football team roster
Players
Coaches
Offense

Pos.	#	Name	Class
WR	17	Emmanuel Sanders	So

Defense

Pos.	#	Name	Class
DE	40	Justin Rogers	Sr

Special teams

Pos.	#	Name	Class
P	11	Andrew Galloway	Jr
P/K	15	Thomas Morstead	Jr

Head coach

- Phil Bennett

Coordinators/assistant coaches

Legend

- (C) Team captain
- (S) Suspended
- (I) Ineligible
- Injured
- Redshirt
