= 2006 Armed Forces Bowl =

2006 Bell Helicopter Armed Forces Bowl
Tulsa Golden Hurricane	Utah Utes
(8–4)	(7–5)
C-USA	Mountain West
13	25
Head coach: Steve Kragthorpe	Head coach: Kyle Whittingham
	1	2	3	4	Total
Tulsa	0	7	0	6	13
Utah	3	6	10	6	25
- Date: December 23, 2006
- Season: 2006
- Stadium: Amon G. Carter Stadium
- Location: Fort Worth, Texas
- MVP: Louie Sakoda (P/K, Utah) & Paul Smith (QB, Tulsa)
- Referee: Bill McCabe (WAC)
- Attendance: 32,412
- Payout: US$750,000

United States TV coverage
- Network: ESPN
- Announcers: Mike Patrick (play-by-play), Todd Blackledge (color), & Holly Rowe (sideline)

The 2006 Armed Forces Bowl, the 4th edition (previously known as the Fort Worth Bowl), featured the Tulsa Golden Hurricane, and the Utah Utes, both former members of the Western Athletic Conference. In addition to the name change the bowl was sponsored for the first time by Forth Worth based company Bell Helicopter Textron.

== Game summary ==
With 7:50 left in the first quarter, Utah's Louie Sakoda kicked a 45-yard field goal to give Utah an early 3–0 lead. Tulsa's first points came in the second quarter, when quarterback Paul Smith, took in a quarterback sneak 1 yard for a touchdown, putting Tulsa up 7–3. Louie Sakoda later kicked a 39-yard field goal, and then a 41-yard field goal before halftime, giving Utah a 9–7 halftime lead.

In the third quarter, Brett Ratliff threw a 10-yard touchdown pass to Brent Casteel increasing Utah's lead to 16–7. Louie Sakoda added his fourth field goal to push the lead up to 19–7.

Paul Smith answered with a second one-yard touchdown run for Tulsa, pulling Tulsa to within 19–13. Eric Weddle capped the scoring with a 4-yard touchdown, making the final score 25–13.
