= 2006 Georgia Bulldogs football team =

American college football season

2006 Georgia Bulldogs football

Chick-fil-A Bowl champion

Chick-fil-A Bowl, W 31–24 vs. Virginia Tech
- Conference: Southeastern Conference
- Eastern Division

Ranking
- AP: No. 23
- Record: 9–4 (4–4 SEC)
- Head coach: Mark Richt (6th season)
- Offensive coordinator: Neil Callaway (6th season)
- Offensive scheme: Pro-style
- Defensive coordinator: Willie Martinez (2nd season)
- Base defense: 4–3
- Home stadium: Sanford Stadium

2006 Southeastern Conference football standings
	Conf.			Overall
Team	W		L	W		L
Eastern Division
No. 1 Florida x$#	7	–	1	13	–	1
No. 25 Tennessee	5	–	3	9	–	4
No. 23 Georgia	4	–	4	9	–	4
Kentucky	4	–	4	8	–	5
South Carolina	3	–	5	8	–	5
Vanderbilt	1	–	7	4	–	8
Western Division
No. 15 Arkansas x	7	–	1	10	–	4
No. 9 Auburn	6	–	2	11	–	2
No. 3 LSU %	6	–	2	11	–	2
Alabama	2	–	6	6	–	7
Ole Miss	2	–	6	4	–	8
Mississippi State	1	–	7	3	–	9
Championship: Florida 38, Arkansas 28
# – BCS National Champion; $ – BCS representative as conference champion; % – BCS at-large representative; x – Division champion/co-champions; Alabama had all victories vacated by the NCAA in 2010. As such, the official record for Alabama is 0–7 (0–6).; Rankings from AP Poll

The 2006 Georgia Bulldogs football team represented the University of Georgia as a member of the Southeastern Conference (SEC) during the 2006 NCAA Division I FBS football season. Led by sixth-year head coach Mark Richt, the Bulldogs compiled an overall record of 9–4 with a mark of 4–4 in conference play, tying for third place in the SEC's Eastern Division. Georgia was invited to the Chick-fil-A Bowl, where the Bulldogs defeated Virginia Tech. The team played home games at Sanford Stadium in Athens, Georgia.

Despite losses to unranked Kentucky and Vanderbilt, Georgia salvaged its season by beating two ranked teams in the last two games of the regular season: no. 5 Auburn and no. 15 Georgia Tech. The victory over no. 14 Virginia Tech in the Chick-fil-A Bowl gave the Bulldogs three consecutive win over ranked teams. Georgia Bulldogs was ranked no. 23 in the final AP poll.

== Schedule ==
Date	Time	Opponent	Rank	Site	TV	Result	Attendance
September 2	12:30 p.m.	Western Kentucky*	No. 15	Sanford Stadium; Athens, GA	LFS	W 48–12	92,746
September 9	7:45 p.m.	at South Carolina	No. 12	Williams–Brice Stadium; Columbia, SC (rivalry)	ESPN	W 18–0	82,513
September 16	1:00 p.m.	UAB*	No. 10	Sanford Stadium; Athens, GA	CSS	W 34–0	92,746
September 23	12:30 p.m.	Colorado*	No. 9	Sanford Stadium; Athens, GA	LFS	W 14–13	92,746
September 30	9:00 p.m.	at Ole Miss	No. 10	Vaught–Hemingway Stadium; Oxford, MS	ESPN2	W 14–9	57,184
October 7	7:45 p.m.	No. 13 Tennessee	No. 10	Sanford Stadium; Athens, GA (rivalry)	ESPN	L 33–51	92,746
October 14	12:30 p.m.	Vanderbilt^{†}	No. 16	Sanford Stadium; Athens, GA (rivalry)	LFS	L 22–24	92,746
October 21	1:00 p.m.	Mississippi State		Sanford Stadium; Athens, GA		W 27–24	92,746
October 28	3:30 p.m.	vs. No. 9 Florida		Alltel Stadium; Jacksonville, FL (rivalry)	CBS	L 14–21	84,572
November 4	1:00 p.m.	at Kentucky		Commonwealth Stadium; Lexington, KY		L 20–24	62,120
November 11	12:30 p.m.	at No. 5 Auburn		Jordan–Hare Stadium; Auburn, AL (Deep South's Oldest Rivalry)	LFS	W 37–15	87,451
November 25	3:30 p.m.	No. 16 Georgia Tech*		Sanford Stadium; Athens, GA (Clean, Old-Fashioned Hate)	CBS	W 15–12	92,746
December 30	8:00 p.m.	vs. No. 14 Virginia Tech*		Georgia Dome; Atlanta, GA (Chick-fil-A Bowl)	ESPN	W 31–24	75,406
*Non-conference game; ^{†}Homecoming; Rankings from AP Poll released prior to the game; All times are in Eastern time

== Rankings ==
Ranking movements Legend: ██ Increase in ranking ██ Decrease in ranking — = Not ranked RV = Received votes
	Week															
Poll	Pre	1	2	3	4	5	6	7	8	9	10	11	12	13	14	Final
AP	15	12	10	9	10	10	16	RV	RV	—	—	RV	RV	RV	RV	23
Coaches	14	11	9	7	9	9	13	24	25	RV	—	RV	RV	RV	RV	RV
Harris	Not released				9	10	14	24	RV	RV	—	RV	RV	RV	RV	Not released
BCS	Not released							—	—	—	—	—	—	—	—	Not released

== Preseason ==
Following a 2005 campaign in which the Georgia finished the year ranked no. 10, the Bulldogs were ranked no. 14 in the preseason Coaches Poll.

Ten players were named to the 2006 SEC Media Days Pre-Season All-Conference Football Team. TE Martrez Milner, OT Daniel Inman, C Nick Jones, DE Quentin Moses and PK Brandon Coutu were selected as first-team members. LB Jarvis Jackson, DB Tra Battle and P Gordon Ely-Kelso were named to the second team and RB Thomas Brown and LB Tony Taylor to the third team.

== Game summaries ==
The prevalent theme throughout the 2006 season was the search for a starting quarterback for the Bulldogs. Senior Joe Tereshinski III, redshirt freshman Joe Cox and true freshman Matthew Stafford all saw significant playing time during the season.

=== Western Kentucky ===
	1	2	3	4	Total
WKU	0	7	0	5	12
#14 Georgia	17	14	3	14	48

Joe Tereshinski III started the game at quarterback for Georgia and completed 7 of 17 passes for 90 yards and a touchdown. True freshman Matthew Stafford (3 of 5 passing; 40 yards and a touchdown) and redshirt freshman Joe Cox (2 of 3 passing; 29 yards and an interception) both saw playing time at quarterback.

Defensive end Quentin Moses was named SEC Defensive Lineman of the Week for his performance against WKU which included 2.5 tackles for losses, one sack and three quarterback hurries.

=== South Carolina ===
	1	2	3	4	Total
#11 Georgia	3	12	0	3	18
South Carolina	0	0	0	0	0

Joe Tereshinski started the game at quarterback and completed 2 of 3 passes for 18 yards. However, he was injured on the opening drive of the game and was replaced by Matthew Stafford. Stafford completed 8 of 19 passes for 171 yards and 3 interceptions, but South Carolina also had 3 fumbles of their own as well as a safety.

Defensive end Charles Johnson was named SEC Defensive Player of the Week for his performance against South Carolina which included five tackles (four for losses), one sack, one safety, two quarterback pressures and one pass deflection.

=== UAB ===
	1	2	3	4	Total
UAB	0	0	0	0	0
#9 Georgia	7	3	10	14	34

Matthew Stafford got his first career start at quarterback and completed 10 of 17 passes for 107 yards with no touchdowns or interception. Joe Cox also saw brief action at quarterback late in the game.

Offensive guard Fernando Velasco was named SEC Offensive Lineman of the Week for his performance against UAB which included a 90% grading and had two dominator blocks.

=== Colorado ===
	1	2	3	4	Total
Colorado	3	7	3	0	13
#7 Georgia	0	0	0	14	14

Getting his second start, Matthew Stafford and the offense struggled, completing 8 of 16 passes for 76 yards, with no touchdowns or interceptions, as Colorado jumped Georgia on their way to a 13–0 lead. Stafford was replaced by Joe Cox, who rallied the team to victory in the fourth quarter, completing 10 of 13 passes for 154 yards and 2 touchdowns. Cox found tight end Martrez Milner for a 20-yard touchdown with :46 left in the game, and Colorado QB Bernard Jackson was sacked on Colorado's last-ditch effort to win the game.

Redshirt freshman quarterback Joe Cox was named both SEC Freshman of the Week and Sporting News College Football Player of the Week for his performance against Colorado in which he led the Bulldogs to a come-from-behind victory that was capped by a 20-yard touchdown pass with :46 on the clock.

=== Ole Miss ===
	1	2	3	4	Total
#9 Georgia	0	0	7	7	14
Ole Miss	0	3	0	6	9

Starting quarterback Joe Cox struggled (4 of 10 for 24 yards, no touchdowns or interceptions) and backup Matthew Stafford did not fare much better (7 for 18 for 91 yards, no touchdowns or interceptions). Georgia's second half scores came on a pair of one yard runs by fullback Brannan Southerland.

Defensive end Charles Johnson was named SEC Defensive Lineman Of The Week for his performance against Ole Miss which included two sacks, one pass breakup and two third-down stops. As of this week, Johnson was the conference leader with nine tackles for loss.

=== Tennessee ===
	1	2	3	4	Total
#14 Tennessee	7	7	10	27	51
#9 Georgia	10	14	3	6	33

Georgia took advantage of Special teams play to jump out to a 24–7 lead in the 2nd quarter. However, Tennessee stiffened its defense and scored on every possession but one in the second half to record a 51–33 victory over the ninth ranked Georgia Bulldogs. Georgia entered the game with the #1 ranked scoring defense in the nation, but the Vols dropped them to #17. Erik Ainge was 25-of-38 with 2 TD's and no interceptions. Georgia scored twice on Special Teams, with an 85-yard punt return by Mikey Henderson in the first half and a 99-yard, school record tying kickoff return by Thomas Brown in the second half. Tennessee DB Antonio Wardlow blocked and punt and recovered the ball in the endzone to post a TD for the Vols in the 2nd half. Robert Meachem had 7 receptions for 98 yards and moved into first place nationally for receiving yards per game. A photo of Wardlow's punt block and recovery made the cover of Sports Illustrated for October 16, 2006.

Kregg Lumpkin led the Bulldogs with 88 yards on 13 carries. Joe Tereshinski was 12-of-20 for 164 yards and 1 touchdown, while throwing 2 interceptions and losing a fumble. Georgia was playing without starting kicker, Brandon Coutu, who injured his kicking on the Thursday before the game and was declared "out for the season."

=== Vanderbilt ===
	1	2	3	4	Total
Vanderbilt	0	7	14	3	24
#14 Georgia	3	10	0	9	22

Both Joe Tereshinski and Matthew Stafford played at quarterback, but neither was able to guide the offense to a victory. Tony Taylor's interception return for a touchdown gave Georgia a 22–21 lead late in the fourth quarter, but Vanderbilt got a short field goal from Bryant Hantfeldt as time expired for the 24–22 stunning upset. Georgia's loss caused the team to drop out of the top 25 for the first time since 2001.

=== Mississippi State ===
	1	2	3	4	Total
Georgia	7	14	0	6	27
Mississippi State	7	0	10	7	24

Matthew Stafford started at quarterback and threw for 267 yards and 2 touchdowns. Still, Georgia had to stave off a late rally by Mississippi State to get the win.

Freshman quarterback Matthew Stafford was named SEC Freshman of the Week for his performance against Mississippi State in which he completed 20-of-32 passes for 267 yards and two touchdowns.

=== Florida ===
	1	2	3	4	Total
#8 Florida	7	7	7	0	21
#25 Georgia	0	0	7	7	14

The 2006 edition of the Florida–Georgia football rivalry was won by Florida. Matthew Stafford and the Georgia offense were ineffective in the first half and Florida lead 14–0 at halftime. On the first play of the half, Georgia tailback Kregg Lumpkin fumbled the ball and Florida returned the fumble for a touchdown. Stafford could not guide the Georgia offense to victory and he finished the day completing just 13 of 33 passing attempts for 151 yards, no touchdowns and 2 interceptions. However, he did score on a 13-yard touchdown run in the third quarter. After Kregg Lumpkin's 8 yard scoring run early in the fourth quarter, Georgia had a chance to send the game to overtime. However, the eventual national champion Gators defense stiffened and sent the Dawgs home with yet another loss in this series.

=== Kentucky ===
	1	2	3	4	Total
Georgia	7	7	0	6	20
Kentucky	3	7	0	14	24

Hoping to rebound from its loss to Florida, Georgia went into the half leading 14–10. The score did not change in the third quarter, but Kentucky outscored Georgia 14–6 in the fourth quarter to seal its victory. Matthew Stafford's struggles continued as he completed 16 of 28 pass attempts for 230 yards with only one touchdown and 3 interceptions, including one in the final 2 minutes to seal the Wildcat victory.

=== Auburn ===
	1	2	3	4	Total
Georgia	7	23	0	7	37
#5 Auburn	0	7	8	0	15

Coming into the game with Auburn, Georgia's program seemed to be in shambles. It had lost four of its last five games, including rare losses to Vanderbilt and Kentucky. Georgia set the tone on their opening drive when Matthew Stafford found A.J. Bryant for a 53-yard gain down to the Auburn 8 yard line. Kregg Lumpkin took it in from there, and Georgia never looked back. Georgia seemed to reverse all of its ill fortunes in an explosive second quarter that saw them score 23 points and take a 30–7 lead into the lockers at halftime. The second quarter featured contributions from both the offense and the defense: a 30-yard interception return for a touchdown by Tra Battle, a one-yard touchdown run by Brannan Southerland, a 14-yard touchdown pass from Stafford to Kregg Lumpkin and a 34-yard field goal by Gordon Ely-Kelso.

Defensive back Tra Battle was named Week 11 Cingular All-America Player of the Week Nominee, SEC Defensive Player of the Week, and National Defensive Player Of The Week for his performance against Auburn which included three interceptions, one of which was returned by Battle for a touchdown.

Freshman quarterback Matthew Stafford was named SEC Freshman of the Week for his performance against Auburn in which he completed 14 of 20 passes for 219 yards and a touchdown and rushed for 83 yards on seven attempts with a touchdown.

=== Georgia Tech ===
	1	2	3	4	Total
#15 Georgia Tech	0	3	3	6	12
Georgia	0	0	7	8	15

Facing its second top 25 team in as many outings, Georgia got off to a slow start, trailing at the half by 3–0. Georgia opened up the scoring in the second half with a 29-yard fumble return by linebacker Tony Taylor. The game wound up being a defensive struggle and Matthew Stafford put up modest numbers (16 of 29 for 171 yards, 1 touchdown and zero interceptions) and the Bulldogs were held to 84 yards rushing. Georgia's defense shut down the Tech passing attack, limiting Tech quarterback Reggie Ball to 6 of 22 for 42 yards, no touchdowns and 2 interceptions.

Defensive back Paul Oliver was named SEC Defensive Player of the Week for his performance against Georgia Tech in which he held All-American wide receiver Calvin Johnson to two receptions and 13 yards, while also breaking up three passes and intercepting a pass.

=== Virginia Tech—Chick-fil-A Bowl ===
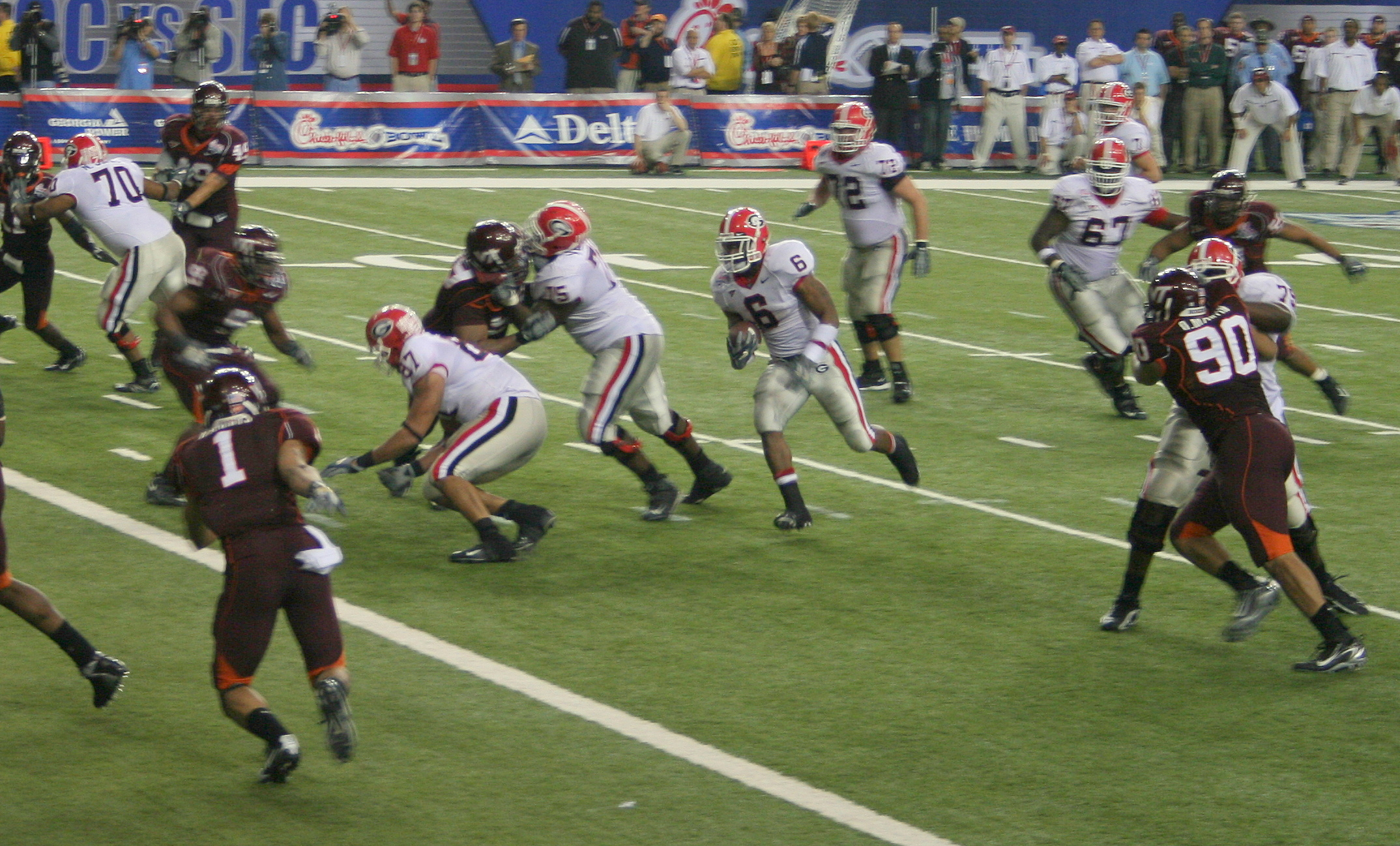
2006 Chick-fil-A Bowl.

When Neil Callaway, Georgia's offensive coordinator from 2001 to 2006, left at the end of the regular season to become the head football coach at University of Alabama at Birmingham, Richt named Mike Bobo as the new offensive coordinator; Bobo had already taken over the play-calling duties from Richt starting with the Georgia Tech game. He debuted as coordinator for the 2006 Chick-fil-A Bowl against Virginia Tech.

In the bowl game, Virginia Tech jumped out to a 21–3 halftime lead, scoring on two one-yard touchdowns from tailback Brandon Ore and a 53-yard pass from flanker Eddie Royal to tight end Sam Wheeler. In the second half, Georgia scored 28 unanswered points and held off a late Tech rally to win 31–24.

2006 Chick-fil-A Bowl
Georgia Bulldogs	Virginia Tech Hokies
(9–4)	(10–3)
31	24
Head coach: Mark Richt	Head coach: Frank Beamer
	AP / Coaches / BCS; 14 / 14 / 15
	1	2	3	4	Total
Georgia	3	0	10	18	31
Virginia Tech	0	21	0	3	24
- Date: December 30, 2006
- Season: 2006
- Stadium: Georgia Dome
- Location: Atlanta

== Roster ==
Quarterbacks: 7 Stafford, Matthew QB Fr.; 13 Tereshinski III, Joe QB† Sr.; 14 Cox, Joe QB RFr.; 15 Barnes, Blake QB So.; 16 Charles Stanford II QB; 17 deLaureal, Jonathan QB Fr.; Running backs: 6 Lumpkin, Kregg TB† Jr.; 20 Brown, Thomas 'TB+ Jr.; 24 Moreno, Knowshon TB Fr.; 28 Ware, Danny TB Jr.; 39 Johnson, Jason TB Jr.; 47 Lane, Mitchell TB Fr.; Fullbacks: 33 Thomason, Brett FB So.; 35 Williams, Des FB Sr.; 36 Southerland, Brannan FB† So.; 46 White, Stephen FB Sr.; 48 Munzenmaier, Fred FB Fr.; 49 Chapas, Shaun FB Fr.; 98 Taylor, Tripp FB Fr.; Tight ends: 81 Ward, NaDerris TE Fr.; 84 Watson, Coleman TE Jr.; 86 Chandler, Tripp TE So.; 87 Milner, Martrez TE† Sr.; 89 Holden, Trahern TE Sr.; Wide receivers: 1 Massaquoi, Mohamed SE† So.; 4 Bailey, Sean FLK Sr.; 8 Spellman, Vernon SE RFr.; 11 Hearn, Hagan WR RSo.; 12 Croffie, Percie WR RJr.; 16 Durham, Kris SE Fr.; 18 Bryant, A.J. FLK† Jr.; 26 Wilson, Tony WR Fr.; 27 Henderson, Mikey FLK Jr.; 80 Raley, Mario SE Sr.; 82 Moore, Michael FLK RFr.; 83 Gartrell, T.J. SE Jr.; 85 Goodman, Demiko SE So.; 88 Harris, Kenneth FLK So.	Offensive line: 61 Turner, Michael TT Sr.; 63 Davis, Chris OL Fr.; 63 Mitchell, Orry C So.; 64 Smith, Ian C RFr.; 67 Adams, Chester TG† Jr.; 68 Abbott, Chris SG Sr.; 69 Speight, Alex OL Fr.; 70 Jones, Nick C† Sr.; 72 Inman, Daniel TT† Sr.; 73 White, Micky OL Fr.; 74 Perez, Kevin C Fr.; 75 Velasco, Fernando SG† Jr.; 76 Watts, Seth TG So.; 77 McKinzey, Zeb SG Sr.; 78 Davis, Josh OL Fr.; 79 Shackleford, Ken ST† Sr.; Defensive line: 38 Howard, Marcus DE Jr.; 41 Battle, Roderick DE RFr.; 54 Dixon, Dale DT Sr.; 55 Lomax, Jeremy DE So.; 56 Atkins, Geno DT Fr.; 71 Lyles, Justin DT Jr.; 84 Nickels, Casey DE Fr.; 90 Gant, Ray DT† Sr.; 91 Weston, Kade DT RFr.; 94 Moses, Quentin DE† Sr.; 95 Owens, Jeff DT† So.; 96 Gully, Andrew DE RFr.; 99 Johnson, Charles DE† Jr.; Linebackers: 12 Miller, Brandon SLB† Jr.; 33 Ellerbe, Dannell WLB So.; 35 Pick, Matt LB Fr.; 37 Hebron, Akeem LB Fr.; 38 Moss, Taylor LB RJr.; 42 Verdun Wheeler, Danny SLB Sr.; 43 Taylor, Tony WLB† Sr.; 44 Washington, Marcus MLB So.; 45 Jackson, Jarvis MLB† Sr.; 48 Watkins, Tommy WLB RFr.; 49 Williams, Patrick LB RJr.; 50 Gamble, Darryl LB Fr.; 51 Dent, Akeem LB Fr.; 52 Dewberry, Darius LB Fr.; 53 Gaunder, Chris WLB Jr.; 57 Boyd, Benjamin LB So.; 60 Krauth, Charles LB So.; 65 Sullivan, Will LB Fr.	Defensive backs: 2 Allen, Asher SC Fr.; 3 Evans, Bryan SC† RFr.; 5 Byrd, CJ FS So.; 8 Oliver, Paul WC† Jr.; 9 Jones, Reshad DB Fr.; 10 Baldwin, Donavon ROV RFr.; 11 Brown, Ramarcus WC So.; 15 Francis, Rowdy FS So.; 15 Pittman, Mitchell FS So.; 16 Gloer, Chad DB Fr.; 17 Coates, Antavious FS RFr.; 22 Gibson, DeMarcus CB Sr.; 22 Sims, Antonio ROV So.; 23 Miller, Prince DB Fr.; 25 Battle, Tra ROV† Sr.; 27 Williams, Taylor DB RFr.; 29 Flowers, Thomas SC Jr.; 30 Johnson, Kelin FS† Jr.; 31 Banks, Quintin DB Fr.; 32 O'Keefe, Joseph ROV Sr.; 47 Williams, Andrew FS Jr.; xx Johnson, Andrew DB Fr.; Punters: 26 Mimbs, Brian P So.; 95 Ely-Kelso, Gordon P† Sr.; 99 Murphy, Erick P Fr.; Place kickers: 22 Stansell, Bo PK Fr.; 93 Bailey, Andy PK Jr.; 96 Coutu, Brandon PK† Jr.; Long snappers: 59 Fowler, Bo SN So.; 65 Henson, Jeff SN† Jr.; Holders: 15 Francis, Rowdy H So.; 26 Mimbs, Brian H† So.; Punt returners: 2 Allen, Asher PR Fr.; 29 Flowers, Thomas PR Jr.; 27 Henderson, Mikey PR† Jr.; Kick returners: 2 Allen, Asher KR† Fr.; 28 Ware, Danny KR Jr.
Key
†Starter at position as of 7/10/2006
Positions: C = Center; CB = Cornerback; DB = Defensive back; DE = Defensive end; DT = Defensive tackle; FB = Fullback; FLK = Flanker; FS = Free safety; H = Holder; KR = Kickoff returner; MLB = Middle linebacker; LB = Linebacker; OL = Offensive line; P = Punter; PK = Place kicker; PR = Punt returner; ROV = Rover; SC = Short corner; SE = Split end; SG = Split guard; SLB = Sam Linebacker; SN = Snapper; ST = Split tackle; TB = Tailback; TE = Tight end; TG = Tight guard; TT = Tight tackle; WLB = Will linebacker
Year: Fr = Freshman; RFr = Redshirt Freshman; So = Sophomore; RSo = Redshirt Sophomore; Jr = Junior; Sr = Senior

== Awards and honors ==
=== Postseason all-star games ===
Mark Richt and ten Georgia players were invited to post-season all-star games.

- Defensive tackle Ray Gant played in the North–South All-Star Classic on January 13, 2007.
- Coach Richt served an assistant coach in the Hula Bowl game played on January 14, 2007, for the victorious East (Aina) squad.
- Center Nick Jones played in the Hula Bowl.
- Punter Gordon Ely-Kelso played in the Hula Bowl.
- Linebacker Danny Verdun Wheeler played in the Hula Bowl.
- Linebacker Jarvis Jackson was to play in the canceled Las Vegas Bowl on January 15, 2007.
- Offensive lineman Daniel Inman played in the Las Vegas Bowl.
- Rover Tra Battle played in the Las Vegas Bowl.
- Tight end Martrez Milner played in the Senior Bowl on January 27, 2007.
- Defensive end Quentin Moses played in the Senior Bowl.
- Linebacker Tony Taylor played in the Senior Bowl.

== Statistics ==
=== Team ===
Statistic	Georgia	Opponent
Scoring	327	229
Points per game	23.4	16.4
First downs	217	198
Rushing	93	89
Passing	116	92
Penalty	8	17
Total offense	4053	3357
Avg per play	5.3	4.3
Avg per game	289.5	239.8
Fumbles-Lost	22-15	22-11
Penalties-Yards	78-611	70-529
Avg per game	43.6	37.8

Statistic	Georgia	Opponent
Punts-Yards	53-2009	67-2747
Avg per punt	37.9	41.0
Time of possession/Game	27:24	28:16
3rd down conversions	62 / 159 (39%)	45 / 164 (27%)
4th down conversions	9 / 14 (64%)	7 / 15 (47%)
Touchdowns scored	40	28
Field goals-Attempts-Long	16-21-55	11-16-48
PAT-Attempts	33-36 (92%)	24-25 (96%)
Red-Zone Scores	38-46 (83%)	29-39 (74%)
Red-Zone Touchdowns	29-46 (63%)	20-39 (51%)
Attendance	649,222	289,268
Games/Avg per Game	7 / 92,746	4 / 72,317

==== Scores by quarter ====
	1	2	3	4	Total
Opponents	27	76	55	71	229
Georgia	64	97	47	119	327

=== Offense ===
==== Rushing ====
Name	GP	Att	Gain	Loss	Net	Avg	TD	Long	Avg/G
Kregg Lumpkin	13	162	853	55	798	4.9	6	26	61.4
Danny Ware	12	81	343	17	326	4.0	3	41	27.2
Thomas Brown	7	62	278	22	256	4.1	1	24	36.6
Matthew Stafford	13	47	274	83	191	4.1	3	39	14.7
Brannan Southerland	13	46	128	8	120	2.6	8	17	9.2
Des Williams	6	5	17	0	17	3.4	0	8	2.8
Mikey Henderson	11	1	3	0	3	3.0	0	3	0.3
Joe Cox	4	1	1	0	1	1.0	0	1	0.2
A. J. Bryant	13	1	0	2	-2	-2.0	0	0	-0.2
Joe Tereshinski	4	8	14	32	-18	-2.2	0	12	-4.5
Team	12	12	0	36	-36	-3.0	0	0	-3.0
Total	13	426	1911	255	1656	3.9	21	41	127.4
Opponents	13	433	1774	367	1407	3.2	15	31	108.2

==== Passing ====
Name	GP	Effic	Att-Cmp-Int	Pct	Yds	TD	Lng	Avg/G
Matthew Stafford	13	108.99	135-256-13	52.77	1749	7	53	134.5
Joe Tereshinski	4	128.83	32-57-2	56.1	423	3	46	105.8
Joe Cox	4	144.64	17-28-1	60.7	225	2	34	56.2
Team	12	0.00	0-1-0	0.0	0	0	0	0.0
Total	13	114.90	184-342-16	53.8	2397	12	53	184.4
Opponents	14	100.61	182-342-19	53.2	1950	11	53	150.0

==== Receiving ====
Name	GP	No.	Yds	Avg	TD	Long	Avg/G
Martrez Milner	12	30	425	14.2	3	41	35.4
Mohamed Massaquoi	12	30	366	12.2	2	39	30.5
Kregg Lumpkin	13	17	116	6.8	1	19	8.9
Kenneth Harris	13	15	305	20.3	0	41	23.5
A. J. Bryant	13	14	251	17.9	0	53	19.3
Danny Ware	12	14	184	13.1	0	29	15.3
Brannan Southerland	13	14	157	11.2	2	27	12.1
Demiko Goodman	10	13	187	14.4	0	32	18.7
Mario Raley	11	8	111	13.9	2	25	10.1
Kris Durham	13	8	82	10.2	0	16	6.3
Thomas Brown	7	7	71	10.1	0	20	10.1
Mikey Henderson	11	7	44	6.3	0	15	4.0
Tripp Chandler	13	2	37	18.5	1	21	2.8
Michael Moore	9	2	36	18.0	0	19	4.0
Des Williams	6	1	18	18.0	0	18	3.0
Coleman Watson	8	1	13	13.0	1	13	1.6
Matthew Stafford	13	1	-6	-6.0	0	0	-0.5
Total	13	184	2397	13.0	12	53	184.4
Opponents'	13	182	1950	10.7	11	53	150.0

=== Defense ===
Name	GP	Tackles				Sacks	Interceptions				Pass defense		Fumbles		Blkd Kick	Safety
Name	GP	Solo	Ast	Total	TFL-Yds	No-Yds	No.-Yds	Avg	TD	Long	BrUp	QBH	Rcv-Yds	FF	Blkd Kick	Safety
Tony Taylor	13	65	31	96	7.5-26	3.0-18	7-97	13.9	1	52	2	10	2-29	2	0	0
Jarvis Jackson	13	37	34	71	2.5-14	1.0-12	1-0	0.0	0	0	0	7	0	0	0	0
Kelin Johnson	13	48	12	60	5.5-32	2.5-23	2-2	1.0	0	2	1	5	2-0	0	0	0
Tra Battle	13	35	23	58	4.5-15	2.0-12	6-154	25.7	1	53	7	1	0	1	0	0
Paul Oliver	13	46	11	57	6.5-19	2.0-9	3-44	14.7	0	30	6	2	1-0	2	0	0
Charles Johnson	13	36	8	44	19.0-89	9.5-55	0	0	0	0	10	27	1-9	3	0	0
Ramarcus Brown	12	26	13	39	1.0-1	0	0	0	0	0	3	0	0	1	0	0
Danny Verdun Wheeler	13	24	13	37	4.0-4	0	0	0	0	0	0	5	0	2	0	0
Quentin Moses	13	21	12	33	12.0-44	4.5-26	0	0	0	0	1	27	1-0	0	0	0
Bryan Evans	12	24	2	26	3.0-11	1.0-9	0	0	0	0	6	2	0	0	0	0
Jeff Owens	13	21	5	26	1.5-5	1.0-4	0	0	0	0	3	19	1-1	1	0	0
Asher Allen	13	20	4	24	1.5-3	0	0	0	0	0	0	1	0	0	0	0
Brandon Miller	13	17	6	23	2.0-3	0	0	0	0	0	2	3	1-0	0	0	0
Ray Gant	11	12	6	18	3.5-20	3.0-19	0	0	0	0	1	12	0	0	0	0
Kade Weston	13	8	5	13	0	0	0	0	0	0	2	12	0	0	0	0
Andrew Williams	11	7	5	12	0	0	0	0	0	0	0	0	0	0	0	0
Marcus Howard	13	10	1	11	0	0	0	0	0	0	0	3	1-10	1	0	0
Dale Dixson	13	4	6	10	1.5-3	0	0	0	0	0	1	1	0	0	1	0
Prince Miller	13	8	2	10	0	0	0	0	0	0	0	0	0	0	1	0
Geno Atkins	11	5	4	9	0.5-4	0.5-4	0	0	0	0	0	6	0	0	0	0
CJ Byrd	13	6	2	8	0	0	0	0	0	0	1	0	0	0	0	0
Chris Gaunder	13	5	2	7	0	0	0	0	0	0	0	0	0	0	0	0
Dannell Ellerbe	10	4	3	7	0	0	0	0	0	0	0	2	0	0	0	0
Darius Dewberry	11	4	2	6	1.0-2	0	0	0	0	0	0	2	0	0	0	0
Jeremy Lomax	9	3	2	5	1.0-8	1.0-8	0	0	0	0	0	1	0	0	0	0
Donavon Baldwin	12	4	0	4	0	0	0	0	0	0	0	0	0	0	0	0
M. Washington	11	3	1	4	0	0	0	0	0	0	0	0	0	0	0	0
Roderick Battle	13	3	1	4	2.0-16	2.0-16	0	0	0	0	0	6	0	0	0	0
Marquis Elmore	4	1	2	3	0	0	0	0	0	0	1	0	0	0	0	0
Benjamin Boyd	13	2	0	2	0	0	0	0	0	0	0	0	0	0	0	0
Rowdy Francis	9	2	0	2	0	0	0	0	0	0	0	0	0	0	0	0
Stephen White	13	1	0	1	0	0	0	0	0	0	0	0	0	0	0	0
Tripp Taylor	10	1	0	1	0	0	0	0	0	0	0	0	0	0	0	0
Team	12	0	0	0	0	0	0	0	0	0	0	0	1-0	0	0	1
Total	13	513	218	731	80-319	33-215	19-297	15.6	2	53	47	152	11-49	13	2	1
Opponents	14	524	202	726	64-234	17-121	16-69	4.3	0	46	37	4	15-17	14	3	1

=== Special teams ===
==== Kicking ====
Name	Punting								Kickoffs				
Name	No.	Yds	Avg	Long	TB	FC	I20	Blkd	No.	Yds	Avg	TB	OB
Gordon Ely-Kelso	51	2007	39.4	55	3	17	13	0					
Team	2	2	1.0	2	0	0	0	2					
Andy Bailey									33	2016	61.1	8	3
Ben Wilson									16	962	60.1	1	2
Brandon Coutu									15	963	64.2	6	0
Brian Mimbs									2	120	60.0	0	0
Jason Johnson									1	52	52.0	0	0
Total	53	2009	37.9	55	3	17	13	2	27	4113	61.4	15	5
Opponents	67	2747	41.0	59	5	7	18	1	52	3093	59.5	9	1

==== Returns ====
Name	Punt returns					Kick returns				
Name	No.	Yds	Avg	TD	Long	No.	Yds	Avg	TD	Long
Mikey Henderson	25	367	14.7	2	86					
Asher Allen	4	54	13.5	0	20					
Thomas Flowers	2	40	20.0	0	26					
Ramarcus Brown	1	17	17.0	0	17					
Prince Miller	1	16	16.0	0	0					
Team	1	-1	-1.0	0	0					
CJ Byrd	0	12	0.0	1	12					
Asher Allen						19	420	22.1	0	36
Thomas Brown						15	379	25.3	1	99
Danny Ware						2	30	15.0	0	15
M. Washington						2	14	7.0	0	8
Jason Johnson						1	6	6.0	0	6
Prince Miller						1	10	10.0	0	10
Kregg Lumpkin						1	11	11.0	0	11
Benjamin Boyd						0	-2	0.0	0	0
Total	34	505	14.9	3	86	41	868	21.2	1	99
Opponents	20	186	9.3	1	54	50	1093	21.9	0	53

==== Field goals ====
Name	FGM-FGA	Pct	01-19	20-29	30-39	40-49	50-99	Lg	Blk
Brandon Coutu	13-14	92.91	0-0	2-2	5-5	3-3	3-4	55	0
Andy Bailey	5-8	62.5	1-1	3-3	1-2	0-2	0-0	34	0
Gordon Ely-Kelso	1-2	50.0	0-0	0-1	1-1	0-0	0-0	34	0
