= 2006 South Carolina Gamecocks football team =

American college football season

2006 South Carolina Gamecocks football

Liberty Bowl champion

Liberty Bowl, W 44–36 vs. Houston
- Conference: Southeastern Conference
- Eastern Division
- Record: 8–5 (3–5 SEC)
- Head coach: Steve Spurrier (2nd season)
- Offensive scheme: Fun and gun
- Defensive coordinator: Tyrone Nix (2nd season)
- Base defense: 4–3
- Home stadium: Williams-Brice Stadium

2006 Southeastern Conference football standings
	Conf.			Overall
Team	W		L	W		L
Eastern Division
No. 1 Florida x$#	7	–	1	13	–	1
No. 25 Tennessee	5	–	3	9	–	4
No. 23 Georgia	4	–	4	9	–	4
Kentucky	4	–	4	8	–	5
South Carolina	3	–	5	8	–	5
Vanderbilt	1	–	7	4	–	8
Western Division
No. 15 Arkansas x	7	–	1	10	–	4
No. 9 Auburn	6	–	2	11	–	2
No. 3 LSU %	6	–	2	11	–	2
Alabama	2	–	6	6	–	7
Ole Miss	2	–	6	4	–	8
Mississippi State	1	–	7	3	–	9
Championship: Florida 38, Arkansas 28
# – BCS National Champion; $ – BCS representative as conference champion; % – BCS at-large representative; x – Division champion/co-champions; Alabama had all victories vacated by the NCAA in 2010. As such, the official record for Alabama is 0–7 (0–6).; Rankings from AP Poll

The 2006 South Carolina Gamecocks football team represented the University of South Carolina in the Southeastern Conference during the 2006 NCAA Division I FBS football season. The Gamecocks were led by Steve Spurrier in his second season as USC head coach and played their home games in Williams–Brice Stadium in Columbia, South Carolina.

The Gamecocks finished the season 8–5, ending with wins in the Palmetto Bowl and Liberty Bowl. Their eight-win campaign, victory over Clemson, and bowl victory were each the first since 2001. All of the team's losses were against top-12 opponents, and four of those losses were within seven points.

== Schedule ==
The October 28 game against Tennessee played host to ESPN's College Gameday, the third year in a row that South Carolina had hosted the program.

Date	Time	Opponent	Site	TV	Result	Attendance	Source
August 31	8:00 pm	at Mississippi State	Davis Wade Stadium; Starkville, MS	ESPN	W 15–0	50,277	
September 9	7:45 pm	No. 12 Georgia	Williams–Brice Stadium; Columbia, SC (rivalry)	ESPN	L 0–18	82,513	
September 16	7:00 pm	Wofford*	Williams–Brice Stadium; Columbia, SC	PPV	W 27–20	74,286	
September 23	7:00 pm	Florida Atlantic*	Williams–Brice Stadium; Columbia, SC	PPV	W 45–6	70,860	
September 28	7:30 pm	No. 2 Auburn	Williams–Brice Stadium; Columbia, SC	ESPN	L 17–24	74,374	
October 7	7:00 pm	at Kentucky	Commonwealth Stadium; Lexington, KY	ESPN2	W 24–17	61,449	
October 21	3:00 pm	at Vanderbilt	Vanderbilt Stadium; Nashville, TN	PPV	W 31–13	37,280	
October 28	7:45 pm	No. 8 Tennessee^{†}	Williams–Brice Stadium; Columbia, SC (rivalry, College GameDay)	ESPN	L 24–31	82,011	
November 4	7:45 pm	No. 12 Arkansas	Williams–Brice Stadium; Columbia, SC	ESPN	L 20–26	74,926	
November 11	3:30 pm	at No. 6 Florida	Ben Hill Griffin Stadium; Gainesville, FL	CBS	L 16–17	90,703	
November 18	12:30 pm	Middle Tennessee*	Williams–Brice Stadium; Columbia, SC	PPV	W 52–7	70,442	
November 25	12:00 pm	at No. 24 Clemson*	Memorial Stadium; Clemson, SC (rivalry)	ESPN	W 31–28	83,428	
December 29	4:30 pm	vs. Houston*	Liberty Bowl Memorial Stadium; Memphis, TN (Liberty Bowl)	ESPN	W 44–36	56,103	
*Non-conference game; ^{†}Homecoming; Rankings from AP Poll released prior to the game; All times are in Eastern time
