= 2006 Memphis Tigers football team =

American college football season

2006 Memphis Tigers football
- Conference: Conference USA
- East
- Record: 2–10 (1–7 C-USA)
- Head coach: Tommy West (6th season)
- Offensive coordinator: Randy Fichtner (6th season)
- Offensive scheme: Pro-style
- Defensive coordinator: Joe Lee Dunn (6th season; first 3 games)
- Base defense: 3–3–5
- Home stadium: Liberty Bowl Memorial Stadium

2006 Conference USA football standings
	Conf.			Overall
Team	W		L	W		L
East Division
Southern Miss x	6	–	2	9	–	5
East Carolina	5	–	3	7	–	6
Marshall	4	–	4	5	–	7
UCF	3	–	5	4	–	8
UAB	2	–	6	3	–	9
Memphis	1	–	7	2	–	10
West Division
Houston x$	7	–	1	10	–	4
Rice	6	–	2	7	–	6
Tulsa	5	–	3	8	–	5
SMU	4	–	4	6	–	6
UTEP	3	–	5	5	–	7
Tulane	2	–	6	4	–	8
Championship: Houston 34, Southern Miss 20
$ – Conference champion; x – Division champion/co-champions; Rankings from AP Poll

The 2006 Memphis Tigers football team represented the University of Memphis in the 2006 NCAA Division I FBS football season. Memphis competed as a member of the Conference USA. The team was led by head coach Tommy West. The Tigers played their home games at the Liberty Bowl Memorial Stadium.

== Schedule ==
Date	Time	Opponent	Site	TV	Result	Attendance	Source
September 3	3:30 pm	at Ole Miss*	Vaught–Hemingway Stadium; Oxford, MS (rivalry)	ESPN	L 25–28	55,549	
September 9	7:00 pm	Chattanooga*	Liberty Bowl Memorial Stadium; Memphis, TN		W 33–14	34,419	
September 16	6:00 pm	at East Carolina	Dowdy–Ficklen Stadium; Greenville, NC		L 20–35	37,431	
September 30	11:00 am	No. 15 Tennessee*	Liberty Bowl Memorial Stadium; Memphis, TN	ESPN	L 7–41	61,783	
October 7	6:00 pm	at UAB	Legion Field; Birmingham, AL (Battle for the Bones)		L 29–35	20,644	
October 14	6:00 pm	Arkansas State*	Liberty Bowl Memorial Stadium; Memphis, TN (Paint Bucket Bowl)		L 23–26	31,758	
October 21	7:00 pm	Tulsa^{†}	Liberty Bowl Memorial Stadium; Memphis, TN	CSTV	L 14–35	30,059	
October 28	3:30 pm	at Marshall	Joan C. Edwards Stadium; Huntington, WV		L 27–41	29,204	
November 5	7:00 pm	Southern Miss	Liberty Bowl Memorial Stadium; Memphis, TN (Black and Blue Bowl)	ESPN	L 21–42	28,103	
November 11	7:00 pm	UCF	Liberty Bowl Memorial Stadium; Memphis, TN	CSTV	L 24–26	20,611	
November 18	1:00 pm	Houston	Liberty Bowl Memorial Stadium; Memphis, TN		L 20–23 ^{OT}	20,344	
November 25	8:05 pm	at UTEP	Sun Bowl; El Paso, TX		W 38–19	31,462	
*Non-conference game; ^{†}Homecoming; Rankings from AP Poll released prior to the game; All times are in Central time
