= 2006 PapaJohns.com Bowl =

- PapaJohns.com Bowl logo
South Florida Bulls	East Carolina Pirates
(8–4)	(7–5)
Big East	C-USA
24	7
Head coach: Jim Leavitt	Head coach: Skip Holtz
	1	2	3	4	Total
South Florida	14	10	0	0	24
East Carolina	7	0	0	0	7
- Date: December 23, 2006
- Season: 2006
- Stadium: Legion Field
- Location: Birmingham, Alabama
- MVP: Benjamin Williams (USF)
- Referee: Rick Doan (Sun Belt)
- Attendance: 32,023
- Payout: US$300,000 per team

United States TV coverage
- Network: ESPN2
- Announcers: Gary Thorne (play-by-play); Andre Ware (analysis); Todd Harris (sidelines)

The 2006 PapaJohns.com Bowl was the inaugural postseason college football match of the game, between the South Florida Bulls and the East Carolina Pirates at Legion Field in Birmingham, Alabama. The University of South Florida represented the Big East Conference and East Carolina University represented Conference USA. The game resulted in a 24–7 South Florida victory.

In the inaugural game, South Florida's Benjamin Williams scored the game's first points just over ninety seconds into the game as one of his two touchdowns on the day, and earned the game's MVP honors. Notably, South Florida had previously been a member of C-USA. Moreover, East Carolina's then head coach Skip Holtz, would later become USF head coach Jim Leavitt's successor following the 2009 season.

Scoring summary

Quarter	Time	Drive			Team	Scoring information	Score	
Quarter	Time	Plays	Yards	TOP	Team	Scoring information	USF	ECU
1	13:53		16	0:08	USF	Benjamin Williams 16-yard touchdown run, Delbert Alvarado kick good	7	0
1	08:43		56	3:51	USF	Benjamin Williams 1-yard touchdown run, Delbert Alvarado kick good	14	0
1	05:04		79	3:31	ECU	Bobby Good 48-yard touchdown reception from James Pinkney, Ben Hartman kick good	14	7
2	12:51		48	2:50	USF	Amarri Jackson 37-yard touchdown reception from Matt Grothe, Delbert Alvarado kick good	21	7
2	06:31		25	3:22	USF	38-yard field goal by Delbert Alvarado	24	7
"TOP" = time of possession. For other American football terms, see Glossary of American football.							24	7
