= 2006 South Florida Bulls football team =

American college football season

2006 South Florida Bulls football

PapaJohns.com Bowl champion

PapaJohns.com Bowl, W 24–7 vs. East Carolina
- Conference: Big East Conference
- Record: 9–4 (4–3 Big East)
- Head coach: Jim Leavitt (10th season)
- Offensive coordinator: Rod Smith (2nd season)
- Offensive scheme: Multiple
- Defensive coordinator: Wally Burnham (6th season)
- Base defense: 3–4
- Home stadium: Raymond James Stadium

2006 Big East Conference football standings
| | Conf. | | | Overall |
| Team | W | | L | W | | L |
|---|---|---|---|---|---|---|
| No. 6 Louisville $ | 6 | – | 1 | 12 | – | 1 |
| No. 10 West Virginia | 5 | – | 2 | 11 | – | 2 |
| No. 12 Rutgers | 5 | – | 2 | 11 | – | 2 |
| South Florida | 4 | – | 3 | 9 | – | 4 |
| Cincinnati | 4 | – | 3 | 8 | – | 5 |
| Pittsburgh | 2 | – | 5 | 6 | – | 6 |
| Connecticut | 1 | – | 6 | 4 | – | 8 |
| Syracuse | 1 | – | 6 | 4 | – | 8 |
$ – BCS representative as conference champion; Rankings from AP Poll

The 2006 South Florida Bulls football team represented the University of South Florida (USF) in the 2006 NCAA Division I FBS football season. Their head coach was Jim Leavitt and they played all of their home games at Raymond James Stadium in Tampa, Florida. The 2006 college football season was the tenth season overall for the Bulls and their second season in the Big East Conference.

== Schedule ==
| Date | Time | Opponent | Site | TV | Result | Attendance | Source |
|---|---|---|---|---|---|---|---|
| September 2 | 7:00 p.m. | McNeese State* | Raymond James Stadium; Tampa, FL | ESPN Plus | W 41–10 | 26,351 | |
| September 9 | 7:00 p.m. | FIU* | Raymond James Stadium; Tampa, FL | ESPN360 | W 21–20 | 27,114 | |
| September 16 | 2:30 p.m. | at UCF* | Florida Citrus Bowl; Orlando, FL (rivalry) | CSTV | W 24–17 | 46,708 | |
| September 23 | 7:00 p.m. | at Kansas* | Memorial Stadium; Lawrence, KS | FSN | L 7–13 | 40,933 | |
| September 29 | 8:00 p.m. | No. 23 Rutgers | Raymond James Stadium; Tampa, FL | ESPN2 | L 20–22 | 32,493 | |
| October 7 | 7:00 p.m. | Connecticut | Raymond James Stadium; Tampa, FL | ESPN Plus | W 38–16 | 30,010 | |
| October 14 | 12:00 p.m. | at North Carolina* | Kenan Memorial Stadium; Chapel Hill, NC | ESPNU | W 37–20 | 44,000 | |
| October 22 | 8:00 p.m. | at Cincinnati | Nippert Stadium; Cincinnati, OH | ESPNU | L 6–23 | 15,889 | |
| November 4 | 12:00 p.m. | Pittsburgh^{†} | Raymond James Stadium; Tampa, FL | ESPN Plus | W 22–12 | 35,671 | |
| November 11 | 12:00 p.m. | Syracuse | Raymond James Stadium; Tampa, FL | ESPN Plus | W 27–10 | 29,694 | |
| November 18 | 7:30 p.m. | at No. 10 Louisville | Papa John's Cardinal Stadium; Louisville, KY | ESPNU | L 8–31 | 40,348 | |
| November 25 | 12:00 p.m. | at No. 7 West Virginia | Milan Puskar Stadium; Morgantown, WV | ESPN2 | W 24–19 | 52,790 | |
| December 23 | 12:00 p.m. | vs. East Carolina* | Legion Field; Birmingham, AL (PapaJohns.com Bowl) | ESPN2 | W 24–7 | 32,023 | |
*Non-conference game; ^{†}Homecoming; Rankings from AP Poll released prior to the game; All times are in Eastern time
