= 2006 Mississippi State Bulldogs football team =

American college football season

2006 Mississippi State Bulldogs football
- Conference: Southeastern Conference
- Western Division
- Record: 3–9 (1–7 SEC)
- Head coach: Sylvester Croom (3rd season)
- Offensive coordinator: Woody McCorvey (3rd season)
- Offensive scheme: West Coast
- Defensive coordinator: Ellis Johnson (3rd season)
- Home stadium: Davis Wade Stadium

2006 Southeastern Conference football standings
	Conf.			Overall
Team	W		L	W		L
Eastern Division
No. 1 Florida x$#	7	–	1	13	–	1
No. 25 Tennessee	5	–	3	9	–	4
No. 23 Georgia	4	–	4	9	–	4
Kentucky	4	–	4	8	–	5
South Carolina	3	–	5	8	–	5
Vanderbilt	1	–	7	4	–	8
Western Division
No. 15 Arkansas x	7	–	1	10	–	4
No. 9 Auburn	6	–	2	11	–	2
No. 3 LSU %	6	–	2	11	–	2
Alabama	2	–	6	6	–	7
Ole Miss	2	–	6	4	–	8
Mississippi State	1	–	7	3	–	9
Championship: Florida 38, Arkansas 28
# – BCS National Champion; $ – BCS representative as conference champion; % – BCS at-large representative; x – Division champion/co-champions; Alabama had all victories vacated by the NCAA in 2010. As such, the official record for Alabama is 0–7 (0–6).; Rankings from AP Poll

The 2006 Mississippi State Bulldogs football team represented Mississippi State University as a member of the Western Division of the Southern Conference (SEC) during the 2006 NCAA Division I FBS football season. Led by third-year head coach Sylvester Croom, the Bulldogs compiled an overall record of 3–9 with a mark of 1–7 in conference play, placing last out of six teams in the SEC's Western Division. Mississippi State played home games at Davis Wade Stadium in Starkville, Mississippi.

== Schedule ==
Date	Time	Opponent	Site	TV	Result	Attendance
August 31	7:00 pm	South Carolina	Davis Wade Stadium; Starkville, MS	ESPN	L 0–15	50,277
September 9	11:30 am	No. 4 Auburn	Davis Wade Stadium; Starkville, MS	LFS	L 0–34	43,640
September 16	6:00 pm	Tulane*	Davis Wade Stadium; Starkville, MS		L 29–32	38,130
September 23	6:00 pm	at UAB*	Legion Field; Birmingham, AL		W 16–10	36,104
September 30	11:30 am	at No. 9 LSU	Tiger Stadium; Baton Rouge, LA (rivalry)	LFS	L 17–48	91,960
October 7	1:30 pm	No. 4 West Virginia*	Davis Wade Stadium; Starkville, MS	PPV	L 14–42	40,327
October 14	1:30 pm	Jacksonville State*^{†}	Davis Wade Stadium; Starkville, MS		W 35–3	38,635
October 21	12:00 pm	at Georgia	Sanford Stadium; Athens, GA		L 24–27	92,746
October 28	1:30 pm	Kentucky	Davis Wade Stadium; Starkville, MS		L 31–34	37,834
November 4	11:30 am	at Alabama	Bryant–Denny Stadium; Tuscaloosa, AL (rivalry)	LFS	W 24–16	92,138
November 18	1:30 pm	No. 5 Arkansas	Davis Wade Stadium; Starkville, MS		L 14–28	41,845
November 25	1:00 pm	at Ole Miss	Vaught–Hemingway Stadium; Oxford, MS (Egg Bowl)		L 17–20	57,658
*Non-conference game; ^{†}Homecoming; Rankings from AP Poll released prior to the game; All times are in Central time

== Game summaries ==
=== Alabama ===
Mississippi State at Alabama

Team	1	2	3	4	Total
• Mississippi St	7	17	0	0	24
Alabama	3	7	6	0	16

- Date: November 4
- Location: Bryant–Denny Stadium, Tuscaloosa, Alabama
- Game start: 12:30 p.m. EST
- Source: ESPN

Scoring summary
1	9:52	ALA	Jamie Christensen 19 yard field goal	ALA 3-0
1	6:34	MSST	Tony Burks 25 yard pass from Michael Henig (Adam Carlson kick)	MSST 7-3
2	14:14	MSST	Adam Carlson 39 yard field goal	MSST 10-3
2	11:30	ALA	Jeffrey Dukes 24 yard interception return (Jamie Christensen kick)	Tied 10-10
2	8:04	MSST	Jamayel Smith 13 yard pass from Michael Henig (Adam Carlson kick)	MSST 17-10
2	2:51	MSST	Quinton Culbertson 21 yard interception return (Adam Carlson kick)	MSST 24-10
3	7:17	ALA	Jamie Christensen 26 yard field goal	MSST 24-13
3	1:47	ALA	Jamie Christensen 31 yard field goal	MSST 24-16
