= 2006 Ole Miss Rebels football team =

American college football season

2006 Ole Miss Rebels football
- Conference: Southeastern Conference
- Western Division
- Record: 4–8 (2–6 SEC)
- Head coach: Ed Orgeron (2nd season)
- Offensive coordinator: Dan Werner (1st season)
- Offensive scheme: Spread
- Base defense: 4–3
- Captains: Andrew Wicker; Patrick Willis
- Home stadium: Vaught–Hemingway Stadium

2006 Southeastern Conference football standings
| | Conf. | | | Overall |
| Team | W | | L | W | | L |
|---|---|---|---|---|---|---|
Eastern Division
| No. 1 Florida x$# | 7 | – | 1 | 13 | – | 1 |
| No. 25 Tennessee | 5 | – | 3 | 9 | – | 4 |
| No. 23 Georgia | 4 | – | 4 | 9 | – | 4 |
| Kentucky | 4 | – | 4 | 8 | – | 5 |
| South Carolina | 3 | – | 5 | 8 | – | 5 |
| Vanderbilt | 1 | – | 7 | 4 | – | 8 |
Western Division
| No. 15 Arkansas x | 7 | – | 1 | 10 | – | 4 |
| No. 9 Auburn | 6 | – | 2 | 11 | – | 2 |
| No. 3 LSU % | 6 | – | 2 | 11 | – | 2 |
| Alabama | 2 | – | 6 | 6 | – | 7 |
| Ole Miss | 2 | – | 6 | 4 | – | 8 |
| Mississippi State | 1 | – | 7 | 3 | – | 9 |
Championship: Florida 38, Arkansas 28
# – BCS National Champion; $ – BCS representative as conference champion; % – BCS at-large representative; x – Division champion/co-champions; Alabama had all victories vacated by the NCAA in 2010. As such, the official record for Alabama is 0–7 (0–6).; Rankings from AP Poll

The 2006 Ole Miss Rebels football team represented the University of Mississippi as a member of the Western Division of the Southeastern Conference (SEC) during the 2006 NCAA Division I FBS football season. Led by second-year head coach Ed Orgeron, the Rebels compiled an overall record of 4–8 with a mark of 2–6 in conference play, tying of fourth place in the SEC's Western Division. Ole Miss played home games at Vaught–Hemingway Stadium in Oxford, Mississippi.

== Schedule ==
| Date | Time | Opponent | Site | TV | Result | Attendance |
|---|---|---|---|---|---|---|
| September 3 | 3:30 pm | Memphis* | Vaught–Hemingway Stadium; Oxford, MS (rivalry) | ESPN | W 28–25 | 55,549 |
| September 9 | 11:30 am | at Missouri* | Faurot Field; Columbia, MO | FSN | L 7–34 | 51,112 |
| September 16 | 5:00 pm | at Kentucky | Commonwealth Stadium; Lexington, KY | PPV | L 14–31 | 60,338 |
| September 23 | 5:00 pm | Wake Forest* | Vaught–Hemingway Stadium; Oxford, MS | | L 3–27 | 52,079 |
| September 30 | 8:00 pm | No. 10 Georgia | Vaught–Hemingway Stadium; Oxford, MS | ESPN2 | L 9–14 | 57,184 |
| October 7 | 1:00 pm | Vanderbilt^{†} | Vaught–Hemingway Stadium; Oxford, MS (rivalry) | | W 17–10 | 51,211 |
| October 14 | 2:30 pm | at Alabama | Bryant–Denny Stadium; Tuscaloosa, AL | CBS | L 23–26 ^{OT} | 92,138 |
| October 21 | 11:30 am | at No. 15 Arkansas | Donald W. Reynolds Razorback Stadium; Fayetteville, AR (rivalry) | LFS | L 3–38 | 73,445 |
| October 28 | 11:30 am | No. 7 Auburn | Vaught–Hemingway Stadium; Oxford, MS (rivalry) | LFS | L 17–23 | 55,211 |
| November 4 | 1:00 pm | Northwestern State* | Vaught–Hemingway Stadium; Oxford, MS | | W 27–7 | 47,712 |
| November 18 | 7:00 pm | at No. 9 LSU | Tiger Stadium; Baton Rouge, LA (rivalry) | PPV | L 20–23 ^{OT} | 92,449 |
| November 25 | 1:00 pm | Mississippi State | Vaught–Hemingway Stadium; Oxford, MS (Egg Bowl) | | W 20–17 | 57,658 |
*Non-conference game; ^{†}Homecoming; Rankings from AP Poll released prior to the game; All times are in Central time

== Game summaries ==
=== Memphis ===
| | 1 | 2 | 3 | 4 | Total |
|---|---|---|---|---|---|
| Tigers | 7 | 7 | 0 | 11 | 25 |
| Rebels | 0 | 14 | 7 | 7 | 28 |

=== At Missouri ===
| | 1 | 2 | 3 | 4 | Total |
|---|---|---|---|---|---|
| Rebels | 0 | 7 | 0 | 0 | 7 |
| Tigers | 10 | 7 | 10 | 7 | 34 |

=== At Kentucky ===
| | 1 | 2 | 3 | 4 | Total |
|---|---|---|---|---|---|
| Rebels | 7 | 7 | 0 | 0 | 14 |
| Wildcats | 7 | 14 | 0 | 10 | 31 |

=== Wake Forest ===
| | 1 | 2 | 3 | 4 | Total |
|---|---|---|---|---|---|
| Demon Deacons | 7 | 3 | 17 | 0 | 27 |
| Rebels | 0 | 3 | 0 | 0 | 3 |

=== No. 10 Georgia ===
| | 1 | 2 | 3 | 4 | Total |
|---|---|---|---|---|---|
| No. 10 Bulldogs | 0 | 0 | 7 | 7 | 14 |
| Rebels | 0 | 3 | 0 | 6 | 9 |

=== Vanderbilt ===
| | 1 | 2 | 3 | 4 | Total |
|---|---|---|---|---|---|
| Commodores | 0 | 7 | 0 | 3 | 10 |
| Rebels | 14 | 0 | 3 | 0 | 17 |

=== At Alabama ===
| | 1 | 2 | 3 | 4 | OT | Total |
|---|---|---|---|---|---|---|
| Rebels | 7 | 6 | 0 | 7 | 3 | 23 |
| Crimson Tide | 7 | 3 | 3 | 7 | 6 | 26 |

=== At No. 15 Arkansas ===
| | 1 | 2 | 3 | 4 | Total |
|---|---|---|---|---|---|
| Rebels | 0 | 3 | 0 | 0 | 3 |
| No. 15 Razorbacks | 14 | 7 | 7 | 10 | 38 |

=== No. 7 Auburn ===
| | 1 | 2 | 3 | 4 | Total |
|---|---|---|---|---|---|
| No. 7 Tigers | 7 | 0 | 10 | 6 | 23 |
| Rebels | 7 | 0 | 3 | 7 | 17 |

=== Northwestern State ===
| | 1 | 2 | 3 | 4 | Total |
|---|---|---|---|---|---|
| Demons | 7 | 0 | 0 | 0 | 7 |
| Rebels | 7 | 10 | 10 | 0 | 27 |

=== At No. 9 LSU ===
}

| | 1 | 2 | 3 | 4 | OT | Total |
|---|---|---|---|---|---|---|
| Rebels | 0 | 14 | 6 | 0 | 0 | 20 |
| No. 9 Tigers | 0 | 7 | 0 | 13 | 3 | 23 |

=== Mississippi State ===
| | 1 | 2 | 3 | 4 | Total |
|---|---|---|---|---|---|
| Bulldogs | 0 | 10 | 0 | 7 | 17 |
| Rebels | 7 | 3 | 3 | 7 | 20 |

== Roster ==
2006 Ole Miss Rebels football team roster
| Players | | | Coaches |
|---|---|---|---|
| Offense: Pos. / # / Name / Class | Defense: Pos. / # / Name / Class; LB / / Patrick Willis (C) / Sr | Special teams: Pos. / # / Name / Class | Head coach: Ed Orgeron; Coordinators/assistant coaches: Tony Hughes – Defensive backs; Ryan Nielsen – Defensive line; Legend: (C) Team captain; (S) Suspended; (I) Ineligible; Injured; Redshirt |
