= 2006 UTEP Miners football team =

American college football season

2006 UTEP Miners football
- Conference: Conference USA
- West Division
- Record: 5–7 (3–5 C-USA)
- Head coach: Mike Price (3rd season)
- Offensive coordinator: Eric Price (3rd season)
- Offensive scheme: Spread
- Defensive coordinator: Tim Hundley (3rd season)
- Base defense: Multiple
- Home stadium: Sun Bowl

2006 Conference USA football standings
	Conf.			Overall
Team	W		L	W		L
East Division
Southern Miss x	6	–	2	9	–	5
East Carolina	5	–	3	7	–	6
Marshall	4	–	4	5	–	7
UCF	3	–	5	4	–	8
UAB	2	–	6	3	–	9
Memphis	1	–	7	2	–	10
West Division
Houston x$	7	–	1	10	–	4
Rice	6	–	2	7	–	6
Tulsa	5	–	3	8	–	5
SMU	4	–	4	6	–	6
UTEP	3	–	5	5	–	7
Tulane	2	–	6	4	–	8
Championship: Houston 34, Southern Miss 20
$ – Conference champion; x – Division champion/co-champions; Rankings from AP Poll

The 2006 UTEP Miners football team represented the University of Texas at El Paso (UTEP) as a member of the West Division in Conference USA (C-USA) during the 2006 NCAA Division I FCS football season. Led by third-year head coach Mike Price, the Miners compiled an overall record of 5–7 with a mark of 3–5 in conference play, placing fifth in the C-USA's West Division. The team played home games at the Sun Bowl in El Paso, Texas.

UTEP averaged 42,444 fans per game, ranking 50th nationally.

== Schedule ==
Date	Time	Opponent	Site	TV	Result	Attendance
August 31	8:30 pm	at San Diego State*	Qualcomm Stadium; San Diego, CA	CSTV	W 34–27	34,723
September 9	7:05 pm	No. 24 Texas Tech*	Sun Bowl; El Paso, TX	CSTV	L 35–38 ^{OT}	51,827
September 23	3:00 pm	at New Mexico*	University Stadium; Albuquerque, NM	CSTV	L 13–26	34,069
September 30	7:05 pm	New Mexico State*	Sun Bowl; El Paso, TX (Battle of I-10)		W 44–38	51,500
October 7	7:05 pm	SMU	Sun Bowl; El Paso, TX		W 24–21	41,258
October 14	7:05 pm	Tulane	Sun Bowl; El Paso, TX		W 34–20	35,930
October 21	6:00 pm	at Houston	Robertson Stadium; Houston, TX	TWCEP	L 17–34	18,154
October 27	7:00 pm	at Tulsa	Skelly Stadium; Tulsa, OK	ESPN2	L 20–30	28,074
November 4	7:05 pm	Rice^{†}	Sun Bowl; El Paso, TX		L 31–37	42,685
November 10	6:00 pm	at UAB	Legion Field; Birmingham, AL	ESPN2	W 36–17	13,809
November 18	2:30 pm	at Marshall	Joan C. Edwards Stadium; Huntington, WV		L 21–49	20,783
November 25	7:05 pm	Memphis	Sun Bowl; El Paso, TX		L 19–38	31,462
*Non-conference game; ^{†}Homecoming; Rankings from AP Poll released prior to the game; All times are in Mountain time
