= 2006 Rice Owls football team =

American college football season

2006 Rice Owls football

New Orleans Bowl, L 17–41 vs. Troy
- Conference: Conference USA
- West
- Record: 7–6 (6–2 C-USA)
- Head coach: Todd Graham (1st season)
- Offensive coordinator: Major Applewhite (1st season)
- Offensive scheme: Pro-style
- Defensive coordinator: Paul Randolph (1st season)
- Base defense: 3–4
- Home stadium: Rice Stadium

2006 Conference USA football standings
	Conf.			Overall
Team	W		L	W		L
East Division
Southern Miss x	6	–	2	9	–	5
East Carolina	5	–	3	7	–	6
Marshall	4	–	4	5	–	7
UCF	3	–	5	4	–	8
UAB	2	–	6	3	–	9
Memphis	1	–	7	2	–	10
West Division
Houston x$	7	–	1	10	–	4
Rice	6	–	2	7	–	6
Tulsa	5	–	3	8	–	5
SMU	4	–	4	6	–	6
UTEP	3	–	5	5	–	7
Tulane	2	–	6	4	–	8
Championship: Houston 34, Southern Miss 20
$ – Conference champion; x – Division champion/co-champions; Rankings from AP Poll

The 2006 Rice Owls football team represented Rice University in the 2007 NCAA Division I FBS college football season. The Owls were led by head coach Todd Graham, who left the school in January to coach Tulsa. They played their home games at Rice Stadium in Houston, Texas.

== Schedule ==
Date	Time	Opponent	Site	TV	Result	Attendance	Source
September 2	8:00 pm	Houston	Rice Stadium; Houston, TX (rivalry)	CSTV	L 30–31	23,352	
September 9	9:00 pm	at UCLA*	Rose Bowl; Pasadena, CA	FSN	L 16–26	46,023	
September 16	5:00 pm	No. 8 Texas*	Reliant Stadium; Houston, TX	ESPN2	L 7–52	40,069	
September 23	2:30 pm	at No. 18 Florida State*	Doak Campbell Stadium; Tallahassee, FL	ESPNU	L 7–55	78,154	
September 30	2:30 pm	at Army*	Michie Stadium; West Point, NY	ESPNU	W 48–14	31,597	
October 7	1:00 pm	at Tulane	Louisiana Superdome; New Orleans, LA		L 24–38	15,064	
October 14	6:30 pm	UAB	Rice Stadium; Houston, TX	CSTV	W 34–33	10,153	
October 21	3:00 pm	at UCF	Florida Citrus Bowl; Orlando, FL		W 40–29	30,307	
November 4	8:00 pm	at UTEP	Sun Bowl; El Paso, TX		W 37–31	42,685	
November 11	2:00 pm	at Tulsa	Skelly Stadium; Tulsa, OK		W 41–38 ^{2OT}	18,632	
November 18	2:00 pm	East Carolina^{†}	Rice Stadium; Houston, TX		W 18–17	12,669	
November 25	2:00 pm	SMU	Rice Stadium; Houston, TX (rivalry)		W 31–27	12,867	
December 22	7:00 pm	vs. Troy*	Louisiana Superdome; New Orleans, LA (New Orleans Bowl)	ESPN2	L 17–41	24,791	
*Non-conference game; ^{†}Homecoming; Rankings from AP Poll released prior to the game; All times are in Central time
