= 2006 Tulane Green Wave football team =

American college football season

2006 Tulane Green Wave football
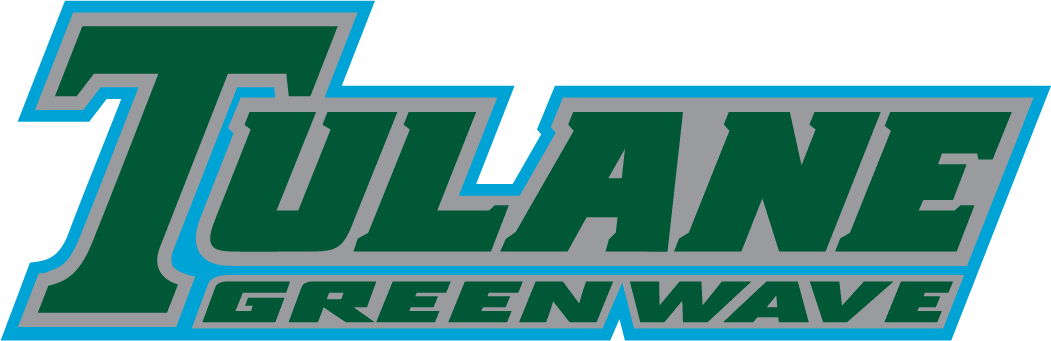
- Conference: Conference USA
- West
- Record: 4–8 (2–6 C-USA)
- Head coach: Chris Scelfo (8th season)
- Offensive coordinator: Frank Scelfo (6th season)
- Offensive scheme: Multiple
- Defensive coordinator: Eric Schumann (5th season)
- Base defense: 4–3
- Home stadium: Louisiana Superdome

2006 Conference USA football standings
	Conf.			Overall
Team	W		L	W		L
East Division
Southern Miss x	6	–	2	9	–	5
East Carolina	5	–	3	7	–	6
Marshall	4	–	4	5	–	7
UCF	3	–	5	4	–	8
UAB	2	–	6	3	–	9
Memphis	1	–	7	2	–	10
West Division
Houston x$	7	–	1	10	–	4
Rice	6	–	2	7	–	6
Tulsa	5	–	3	8	–	5
SMU	4	–	4	6	–	6
UTEP	3	–	5	5	–	7
Tulane	2	–	6	4	–	8
Championship: Houston 34, Southern Miss 20
$ – Conference champion; x – Division champion/co-champions; Rankings from AP Poll

The 2006 Tulane Green Wave football team represented Tulane University in the 2006 NCAA Division I FBS football season. The Green Wave played their home games at the Louisiana Superdome. They competed in the West Division of Conference USA. The team was coached by head coach Chris Scelfo, who was fired after the season.

== Schedule ==
Date	Time	Opponent	Site	TV	Result	Attendance
September 9	6:00 pm	at Houston	Robertson Stadium; Houston, TX		L 7–45	16,506
September 16	6:00 pm	at Mississippi State*	Davis Wade Stadium; Starkville, MS		W 32–29	38,130
September 23	7:00 pm	at No. 10 LSU*	Tiger Stadium; Baton Rouge, LA (Battle for the Rag)	PPV	L 7–49	92,135
September 30	6:30 pm	SMU	Louisiana Superdome; New Orleans, LA	CSTV	L 28–33	21,565
October 7	1:00 pm	Rice	Louisiana Superdome; New Orleans, LA		W 38–24	15,064
October 14	8:00 pm	at UTEP	Sun Bowl Stadium; El Paso, TX		L 20–34	35,930
October 21	1:30 pm	at No. 7 Auburn*	Jordan–Hare Stadium; Auburn, AL (rivalry)		L 13–38	79,837
October 28	1:00 pm	Army*^{†}	Louisiana Superdome; New Orleans, LA		W 42–28	21,053
November 4	6:30 pm	at Marshall	Joan C. Edwards Stadium; Huntington, WV	CSTV	L 21–42	25,128
November 11	1:00 pm	Southern Miss	Louisiana Superdome; New Orleans, LA (Battle for the Bell)		L 3–31	21,687
November 18	1:00 pm	UCF	Louisiana Superdome; New Orleans, LA		W 10–9	15,341
November 24	2:00 pm	at Tulsa	Skelly Stadium; Tulsa, OK		L 3–38	15,502
*Non-conference game; ^{†}Homecoming; Rankings from AP Poll released prior to the game; All times are in Central time
