= 2006 Marshall Thundering Herd football team =

American college football season

2006 Marshall Thundering Herd football
- Conference: Conference USA
- East
- Record: 5–7 (4–4 C-USA)
- Head coach: Mark Snyder (2nd season)
- Home stadium: Joan C. Edwards Stadium

2006 Conference USA football standings
	Conf.			Overall
Team	W		L	W		L
East Division
Southern Miss x	6	–	2	9	–	5
East Carolina	5	–	3	7	–	6
Marshall	4	–	4	5	–	7
UCF	3	–	5	4	–	8
UAB	2	–	6	3	–	9
Memphis	1	–	7	2	–	10
West Division
Houston x$	7	–	1	10	–	4
Rice	6	–	2	7	–	6
Tulsa	5	–	3	8	–	5
SMU	4	–	4	6	–	6
UTEP	3	–	5	5	–	7
Tulane	2	–	6	4	–	8
Championship: Houston 34, Southern Miss 20
$ – Conference champion; x – Division champion/co-champions; Rankings from AP Poll

The 2006 Marshall Thundering Herd football team represented Marshall University in the 2006 NCAA Division I FBS football season. Marshall competed as a member of the East Division of Conference USA, and played their home games at Joan C. Edwards Stadium.

== Schedule ==
Date	Time	Opponent	Site	TV	Result	Attendance	Source
September 2	3:30 pm	at No. 5 West Virginia*	Milan Puskar Stadium; Morgantown, WV (Friends of Coal Bowl)	ESPN Plus	L 10–42	61,077	
September 9	4:30 pm	Hofstra*	Joan C. Edwards Stadium; Huntington, WV		W 54–31	26,861	
September 16	12:30 pm	at Kansas State*	Bill Snyder Family Football Stadium; Manhattan, KS	FSN	L 7–23	46,488	
September 23	4:00 pm	at No. 15 Tennessee*	Neyland Stadium; Knoxville, TN	WOWK	L 7–33	104,818	
October 4	7:30 pm	UCF	Joan C. Edwards Stadium; Huntington, WV	ESPN2	L 22–23	27,572	
October 14	3:00 pm	at SMU	Gerald J. Ford Stadium; Dallas, TX	WOWK	L 21–31	14,032	
October 21	7:00 pm	at UAB	Legion Field; Birmingham, AL	WOWK	W 31–24	12,344	
October 28	4:30 pm	Memphis^{†}	Joan C. Edwards Stadium; Huntington, WV	WOWK	W 41–27	29,204	
November 4	7:30 pm	Tulane	Joan C. Edwards Stadium; Huntington, WV	CSTV	W 42–21	25,128	
November 11	1:00 pm	at East Carolina	Dowdy–Ficklen Stadium; Greenville, NC (rivalry)	WSAZ	L 20–33	41,372	
November 18	4:30 pm	UTEP	Joan C. Edwards Stadium; Huntington, WV		W 49–21	20,783	
November 25	7:30 pm	at Southern Miss	M. M. Roberts Stadium; Hattiesburg, MS	CSTV	L 7–42	28,736	
*Non-conference game; ^{†}Homecoming; Rankings from AP Poll released prior to the game; All times are in Eastern time
