= 2006 Tulsa Golden Hurricane football team =

American college football season

2006 Tulsa Golden Hurricane football

Armed Forces Bowl, L 13–25 vs. Utah
- Conference: Conference USA
- West Division
- Record: 8–5 (5–3 C-USA)
- Head coach: Steve Kragthorpe (4th season)
- Offensive coordinator: Charlie Stubbs (4th season)
- Offensive scheme: Multiple
- Defensive coordinator: Keith Patterson (1st season)
- Base defense: 3–3–5
- Home stadium: Skelly Stadium

2006 Conference USA football standings
	Conf.			Overall
Team	W		L	W		L
East Division
Southern Miss x	6	–	2	9	–	5
East Carolina	5	–	3	7	–	6
Marshall	4	–	4	5	–	7
UCF	3	–	5	4	–	8
UAB	2	–	6	3	–	9
Memphis	1	–	7	2	–	10
West Division
Houston x$	7	–	1	10	–	4
Rice	6	–	2	7	–	6
Tulsa	5	–	3	8	–	5
SMU	4	–	4	6	–	6
UTEP	3	–	5	5	–	7
Tulane	2	–	6	4	–	8
Championship: Houston 34, Southern Miss 20
$ – Conference champion; x – Division champion/co-champions; Rankings from AP Poll

The 2006 Tulsa Golden Hurricane football team represented the University of Tulsa in the 2006 NCAA Division I FBS football season. The team's head coach was Steve Kragthorpe, who resigned at the conclusion of the season. They played home games at Skelly Stadium in Tulsa, Oklahoma and competed in the West Division of Conference USA.

== Schedule ==
Date	Time	Opponent	Site	TV	Result	Attendance	Source
August 31	6:00 pm	Stephen F. Austin*	Skelly Stadium; Tulsa, OK		W 45–7	23,308	
September 9	3:00 pm	at BYU*	LaVell Edwards Stadium; Provo, UT	mtn	L 24–49	56,627	
September 16	6:00 pm	North Texas*^{†}	Skelly Stadium; Tulsa, OK		W 28–3	22,045	
September 23	12:30 pm	at Navy*	Navy–Marine Corps Memorial Stadium; Annapolis, MD	CSTV	W 24–23 ^{OT}	31,604	
October 3	6:30 pm	Southern Miss	Skelly Stadium; Tulsa, OK	ESPN2	W 20–6	20,625	
October 14	2:00 pm	at East Carolina	Dowdy–Ficklen Stadium; Greenville, NC		W 31–10	34,011	
October 21	7:00 pm	at Memphis	Liberty Bowl Memorial Stadium; Memphis, TN	CSTV	W 35–14	30,059	
October 27	7:00 pm	UTEP	Skelly Stadium; Tulsa, OK	ESPN2	W 30–20	28,074	
November 4	2:30 pm	at Houston	Robertson Stadium; Houston, TX	CSTV	L 10–27	22,452	
November 11	2:00 pm	Rice	Skelly Stadium; Tulsa, OK		L 38–41 ^{2OT}	18,632	
November 18	2:00 pm	at SMU	Gerald J. Ford Stadium; University Park, TX		L 24–34	14,658	
November 24	2:00 pm	Tulane	Skelly Stadium; Tulsa, OK		W 38–3	15,502	
December 23	7:00 pm	vs. Utah*	Amon G. Carter Stadium; Texas, TX (Armed Forces Bowl)	ESPN	L 13–25	32,412	
*Non-conference game; ^{†}Homecoming; All times are in Central time
