= 2006 Liberty Bowl =

2006 AutoZone Liberty Bowl
- 48th Liberty Bowl
| Houston Cougars | South Carolina Gamecocks |
| (10–3) | (7–5) |
| C-USA | SEC |
| 36 | 44 |
| Head coach: Art Briles | Head coach: Steve Spurrier |
| | 1 | 2 | 3 | 4 | Total |
|---|---|---|---|---|---|
| Houston | 7 | 21 | 0 | 8 | 36 |
| South Carolina | 7 | 20 | 3 | 14 | 44 |
- Date: December 29, 2006
- Season: 2006
- Stadium: Liberty Bowl Memorial Stadium
- Location: Memphis, Tennessee
- MVP: Blake Mitchell (QB, South Carolina)
- Referee: Frank White (WAC)
- Attendance: 56,103

United States TV coverage
- Network: ESPN
- Announcers: Bob Wischusen, Doug Flutie, Craig James, Todd Harris

The 2006 Liberty Bowl was a college football postseason bowl game played on December 29, 2006, at Liberty Bowl Memorial Stadium in Memphis, Tennessee. The 48th edition of the Liberty Bowl pitted the Houston Cougars against the South Carolina Gamecocks. With sponsorship from AutoZone, the game was officially the AutoZone Liberty Bowl. South Carolina won the game by a score of 44–36.
