= 2006 Syracuse Orange football team =

American college football season

2006 Syracuse Orange football
- Conference: Big East Conference
- Record: 0–8, 4 wins vacated (0–6 Big East, 1 win vacated)
- Head coach: Greg Robinson (2nd season)
- Offensive coordinator: Brian White (1st season)
- Offensive scheme: Multiple
- Base defense: 4–3
- Home stadium: Carrier Dome

2006 Big East Conference football standings
	Conf.			Overall
Team	W		L	W		L
No. 6 Louisville $	6	–	1	12	–	1
No. 10 West Virginia	5	–	2	11	–	2
No. 12 Rutgers	5	–	2	11	–	2
South Florida	4	–	3	9	–	4
Cincinnati	4	–	3	8	–	5
Pittsburgh	2	–	5	6	–	6
Connecticut	1	–	6	4	–	8
Syracuse	1	–	6	4	–	8
$ – BCS representative as conference champion; Rankings from AP Poll

The 2006 Syracuse Orange football team represented Syracuse University during the 2006 NCAA Division I FBS football season. The Orange were coached by Greg Robinson and played their home games at the Carrier Dome in Syracuse, New York.

In 2015, Syracuse vacated the four wins from this season among others from the 2004 to 2006 season, due to the NCAA finding players ineligible for academic fraud.

== Schedule ==
Date	Time	Opponent	Site	TV	Result	Attendance
September 2	6:30 pm	at Wake Forest*	Groves Stadium; Winston-Salem, NC	ESPN360	L 10–20	34,121
September 9	3:30 pm	No. 14 Iowa*	Carrier Dome; Syracuse, NY	ABC	L 13–20 ^{2OT}	37,199
September 16	12:00 pm	at Illinois*	Memorial Stadium; Champaign, IL	ESPNU	W 31–21 (vacated)	40,657
September 23	7:00 pm	Miami (OH)*	Carrier Dome; Syracuse, NY	ESPNU	W 34–14 (vacated)	35,274
September 30	1:30 pm	Wyoming*	Carrier Dome; Syracuse, NY	ESPN360	W 40–34 ^{2OT} (vacated)	38,447
October 7	12:00 pm	Pittsburgh	Carrier Dome; Syracuse, NY (rivalry)	ESPN Plus	L 11–21	41,870
October 14	12:00 pm	at No. 5 West Virginia	Milan Puskar Stadium; Morgantown, WV (rivalry)	ESPN Plus	L 17–41	60,051
October 21	12:00 pm	No. 6 Louisville	Carrier Dome; Syracuse, NY	ESPN Plus	L 13–28	35,708
October 28	12:00 pm	at Cincinnati	Nippert Stadium; Cincinnati, OH	ESPN Plus	L 3–17	20,146
November 11	12:00 pm	at South Florida	Raymond James Stadium; Tampa, FL	ESPN Plus	L 10–27	43,413
November 18	12:00 pm	Connecticut	Carrier Dome; Syracuse, NY (rivalry)	ESPN Plus	W 20–14 (vacated)	35,079
November 25	12:00 pm	at No. 15 Rutgers	Rutgers Stadium; Piscataway, NJ	ESPN Plus	L 7–38	43,791
*Non-conference game; Rankings from AP Poll released prior to the game; All times are in Eastern time
