= 2006 UCF Golden Knights football team =

American college football season

2006 UCF Golden Knights football
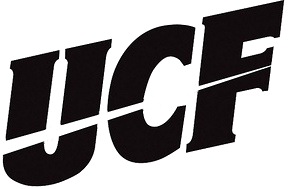
- Conference: Conference USA
- East
- Record: 4–8 (3–5 C-USA)
- Head coach: George O'Leary (3rd season)
- Offensive coordinator: Tim Salem (3rd season)
- Defensive coordinator: Lance Thompson (3rd season)
- Home stadium: Camping World Stadium

2006 Conference USA football standings
	Conf.			Overall
Team	W		L	W		L
East Division
Southern Miss x	6	–	2	9	–	5
East Carolina	5	–	3	7	–	6
Marshall	4	–	4	5	–	7
UCF	3	–	5	4	–	8
UAB	2	–	6	3	–	9
Memphis	1	–	7	2	–	10
West Division
Houston x$	7	–	1	10	–	4
Rice	6	–	2	7	–	6
Tulsa	5	–	3	8	–	5
SMU	4	–	4	6	–	6
UTEP	3	–	5	5	–	7
Tulane	2	–	6	4	–	8
Championship: Houston 34, Southern Miss 20
$ – Conference champion; x – Division champion/co-champions; Rankings from AP Poll

The 2006 UCF Golden Knights football team represented the University of Central Florida in the 2006 NCAA Division I FBS football season. Their head coach was George O'Leary, in his third season with the team. They played in Conference USA, in the East Division.

After a surprise showing in 2005, where they went 7–1 in C-USA and 8–3 in the regular season overall, UCF suffered a bit of a letdown, going 4–8 in 2006 under the new 12-game regular season schedule, and 3–5 in-conference. Their sole non-conference win came against I-AA Villanova. Part of the problem was the transition from a pass-dominated offense led by graduated wide receiver Brandon Marshall to a run-dominated offense led by sophomore running back Kevin Smith.

2006 was the final season that UCF would play at the aging Camping World Stadium. Already under construction was a new 45,000-seat on-campus stadium, which would open in time for the 2007 season. It would also be the final year that UCF would play under the "Golden Knights" nickname. They would drop "Golden" before the 2007 season, becoming simply the UCF Knights, and would soon unveil an updated logo.

One of the highlights of the season was a last-second, nationally televised victory at Marshall on October 4. UCF kicker Michael Torres kicked a go-ahead field goal with eight seconds left, but removed his helmet on the field of play, suffering an excessive celebration penalty. Despite the tense moment, the UCF special teams was able to hold off on the ensuing kickoff. The Golden Knights upset Marshall on the night they celebrated the release of the film We Are Marshall, with the film's star Matthew McConaughey in attendance.

== Schedule ==
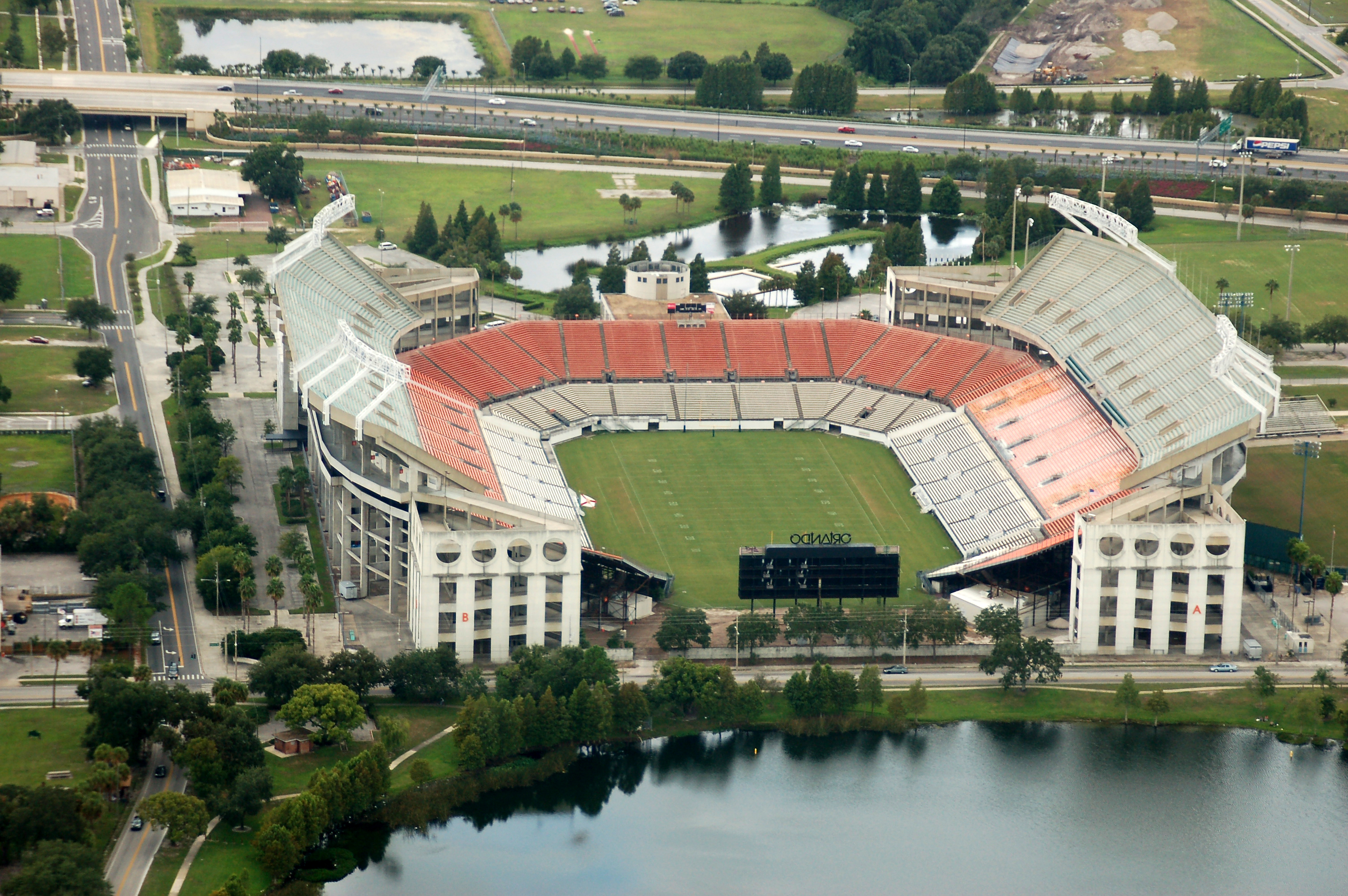
The Florida Citrus Bowl, the Knights home field

Date	Time	Opponent	Site	TV	Result	Attendance	Source
September 2	6:00pm	Villanova*	Florida Citrus Bowl; Orlando, FL		W 35–16	29,398	
September 9	6:00pm	at No. 7 Florida*	Ben Hill Griffin Stadium; Gainesville, FL	PPV	L 0–42	90,210	
September 16	2:30pm	South Florida*	Florida Citrus Bowl; Orlando, FL (rivalry)	CSTV	L 17–24	46,708	
September 26	7:30pm	Southern Miss	Florida Citrus Bowl; Orlando, FL	ESPN2	L 14–19	23,540	
October 4	7:30pm	at Marshall	Joan C. Edwards Stadium; Huntington, WV	ESPN2	W 23–22	27,572	
October 13	8:00pm	Pittsburgh*	Florida Citrus Bowl; Orlando, FL	ESPN	L 7–52	35,858	
October 21	4:00pm	Rice	Florida Citrus Bowl; Orlando, FL		L 29–40	30,307	
October 28	3:30pm	at Houston	Robertson Stadium; Houston, TX	CSTV	L 31–51	13,242	
November 4	4:00pm	East Carolina^{†}	Florida Citrus Bowl; Orlando, FL		L 10–23	31,414	
November 11	8:00pm	at Memphis	Liberty Bowl Memorial Stadium; Memphis, TN	CSTV	W 26–24	20,611	
November 18	2:00pm	at Tulane	Louisiana Superdome; New Orleans, LA		L 9–10	15,341	
November 25	12:00pm	UAB	Florida Citrus Bowl; Orlando, FL	CSS	W 31–22	23,755	
*Non-conference game; ^{†}Homecoming; Rankings from AP Poll released prior to the game; All times are in Eastern time
