= 2006 UAB Blazers football team =

American college football season

2006 UAB Blazers football
- Conference: Conference USA
- East Division
- Record: 3–9 (2–6 C-USA)
- Head coach: Watson Brown (12th season)
- Offensive coordinator: Pat Sullivan (8th season)
- Offensive scheme: Multiple
- Defensive coordinator: Rick Christophel (2nd season)
- Base defense: 4–3
- Home stadium: Legion Field

2006 Conference USA football standings
	Conf.			Overall
Team	W		L	W		L
East Division
Southern Miss x	6	–	2	9	–	5
East Carolina	5	–	3	7	–	6
Marshall	4	–	4	5	–	7
UCF	3	–	5	4	–	8
UAB	2	–	6	3	–	9
Memphis	1	–	7	2	–	10
West Division
Houston x$	7	–	1	10	–	4
Rice	6	–	2	7	–	6
Tulsa	5	–	3	8	–	5
SMU	4	–	4	6	–	6
UTEP	3	–	5	5	–	7
Tulane	2	–	6	4	–	8
Championship: Houston 34, Southern Miss 20
$ – Conference champion; x – Division champion/co-champions; Rankings from AP Poll

The 2006 UAB Blazers football team represented the University of Alabama at Birmingham (UAB) as a member of the East Division in Conference USA (C-USA) during the 2006 NCAA Division I FBS football season. Led by Watson Brown in his 12th and final season as head coach, the Blazers compiled an overall record of 3–9 with a mark of 2–6 in conference play, placing fifth in C-USA's East Division. The team played home games at Legion Field in Birmingham, Alabama.

== Schedule ==
Date	Time	Opponent	Site	TV	Result	Attendance	Source
September 2	6:00 p.m.	at No. 10 Oklahoma*	Gaylord Family Oklahoma Memorial Stadium; Norman, OK	TBS	L 17–24	84,555	
September 9	6:00 p.m.	East Carolina	Legion Field; Birmingham, AL		W 17–12	23,116	
September 16	12:00 p.m.	at No. 10 Georgia*	Sanford Stadium; Athens, GA		L 0–34	92,746	
September 23	6:00 p.m.	Mississippi State*	Legion Field; Birmingham, AL		L 10–16 ^{OT}	36,104	
September 30	6:00 p.m.	Troy*^{†}	Legion Field; Birmingham, AL		W 21–3	32,818	
October 7	6:00 p.m.	Memphis	Legion Field; Birmingham, AL (Battle for the Bones)		W 35–29	20,644	
October 14	6:30 p.m.	at Rice	Rice Stadium; Houston, TX	CSTV	L 33–34	10,153	
October 21	6:00 p.m.	Marshall	Legion Field; Birmingham, AL		L 24–31	12,344	
October 31	6:30 p.m.	at SMU	Gerald J. Ford Stadium; Highland Park, TX	ESPN2	L 9–22	13,125	
November 10	7:00 p.m.	UTEP	Legion Field; Birmingham, AL	ESPN2	L 17–36	13,809	
November 18	7:00 p.m.	at Southern Miss	M. M. Roberts Stadium; Hattiesburg, MS	CSTV	L 20–25	27,749	
November 25	11:00 a.m.	at UCF	Florida Citrus Bowl; Orlando, FL		L 22–31	23,755	
*Non-conference game; ^{†}Homecoming; Rankings from AP Poll released prior to the game; All times are in Central time

== Game summaries ==
=== Oklahoma ===
	1	2	3	4	Total
UAB	0	7	10	0	17
Oklahoma	7	0	14	3	24

=== East Carolina ===
	1	2	3	4	Total
East Carolina	3	0	3	6	12
UAB	0	10	0	7	17

=== Georgia ===
	1	2	3	4	Total
UAB	0	0	0	0	0
Georgia	7	3	10	14	34

=== Mississippi State ===
UAB and Mississippi State during the game at Legion Field.

	1	2	3	4	OT	Total
Mississippi State	0	3	0	7	6	16
UAB	0	7	0	3	0	10

=== Troy ===
	1	2	3	4	Total
Troy	0	3	0	0	3
UAB	14	0	7	0	21

=== Memphis ===
	1	2	3	4	Total
Memphis	10	7	9	3	29
UAB	7	14	14	0	35

=== Rice ===
	1	2	3	4	Total
UAB	0	0	0	0	0
Rice	0	0	0	0	0

=== Marshall ===
	1	2	3	4	Total
Marshall	0	0	0	0	0
UAB	0	0	0	0	0

=== SMU ===
	1	2	3	4	Total
UAB	0	6	0	3	9
SMU	0	7	0	15	22

=== UTEP ===
	1	2	3	4	Total
UTEP	3	13	6	14	36
UAB	7	3	0	7	17

=== Southern Miss ===
	1	2	3	4	Total
UAB	0	0	0	20	20
Southern Miss	0	16	7	2	25

=== UCF ===
	1	2	3	4	Total
UAB	0	3	10	9	22
UCF	14	3	0	7	24
