= 2006 Southern Miss Golden Eagles football team =

American college football season

2006 Southern Miss Golden Eagles football

C-USA East Division champion GMAC Bowl champion

C-USA Championship, L 20–34 vs. Houston

GMAC Bowl, W 28–7 vs. Ohio
- Conference: Conference USA
- Record: 9–5 (6–2 C-USA)
- Head coach: Jeff Bower (17th season)
- Offensive coordinator: Jay Johnson (2nd season)
- Offensive scheme: Multiple
- Defensive coordinator: Jay Hopson (2nd season)
- Base defense: 4–3
- Home stadium: M. M. Roberts Stadium

2006 Conference USA football standings
	Conf.			Overall
Team	W		L	W		L
East Division
Southern Miss x	6	–	2	9	–	5
East Carolina	5	–	3	7	–	6
Marshall	4	–	4	5	–	7
UCF	3	–	5	4	–	8
UAB	2	–	6	3	–	9
Memphis	1	–	7	2	–	10
West Division
Houston x$	7	–	1	10	–	4
Rice	6	–	2	7	–	6
Tulsa	5	–	3	8	–	5
SMU	4	–	4	6	–	6
UTEP	3	–	5	5	–	7
Tulane	2	–	6	4	–	8
Championship: Houston 34, Southern Miss 20
$ – Conference champion; x – Division champion/co-champions; Rankings from AP Poll

The 2006 Southern Miss Golden Eagles football team represented the University of Southern Mississippi in the 2006 NCAA Division I FBS football season. The Golden Eagles were led by head coach Jeff Bower and played their home games at M. M. Roberts Stadium. They were a member of the East Division of Conference USA.

== Schedule ==
Date	Time	Opponent	Site	TV	Result	Attendance	Source
September 2	5:00 pm	at No. 7 Florida*	Ben Hill Griffin Stadium; Gainesville, FL	PPV	L 7–34	90,043	
September 9	6:00 pm	Southeastern Louisiana*	M. M. Roberts Stadium; Hattiesburg, MS		W 45–0	28,258	
September 16	6:00 pm	NC State*	M. M. Roberts Stadium; Hattiesburg, MS		W 37–17	31,748	
September 26	6:30 pm	at UCF	Florida Citrus Bowl; Orlando, FL	ESPN2	W 19–14	23,540	
October 3	6:30 pm	at Tulsa	Skelly Stadium; Tulsa, OK	ESPN2	L 6–20	20,625	
October 14	6:00 pm	Houston^{†}	M. M. Roberts Stadium; Hattiesburg, MS		W 31–27	32,317	
October 21	6:00 pm	at Virginia Tech*	Lane Stadium; Blacksburg, VA	ESPNU	L 6–36	66,233	
October 28	6:30 pm	East Carolina	M. M. Roberts Stadium; Hattiesburg, MS	CSTV	L 17–20 ^{OT}	25,155	
November 5	7:00 pm	at Memphis	Liberty Bowl Memorial Stadium; Memphis, TN (Black and Blue Bowl)	ESPN	W 42–21	28,103	
November 11	1:00 pm	at Tulane	Louisiana Superdome; New Orleans, LA		W 31–3	21,687	
November 18	7:00 pm	UAB^{†}	M. M. Roberts Stadium; Hattiesburg, MS	CSTV	W 25–20	27,749	
November 25	6:30 pm	Marshall	M. M. Roberts Stadium; Hattiesburg, MS	CSTV	W 42–7	28,736	
December 1	7:00 pm	at Houston	Robertson Stadium; Houston, TX (C-USA Championship Game)	ESPN2	L 20–34	31,818	
January 7	7:00 pm	vs. Ohio*	Ladd–Peebles Stadium; Mobile, AL (GMAC Bowl)	ESPN	W 28–7	38,751	
*Non-conference game; ^{†}Homecoming; Rankings from AP Poll released prior to the game; All times are in Central time
