= Charles Vincent =

Charles Vincent may refer to:

- Charles Vincent (priest) (1828–1890), French-Canadian Catholic priest and academic administrator
- Charles Vincent (playwright) (1828–1888), French playwright, novelist, journalist and publisher
- Charles Vincent (historian) (born 1945), American historian
- Charles Vincent (theatre) (1823–1868), English actor/manager in Australia
- Charles Wilson Vincent (1837–1905), British chemist and librarian
- Charles Humbert Marie Vincent (1753–1831), French general
- Chuck Vincent (basketball) (born c. 1975), American basketball player
- Chuck Vincent (director) (1940–1991), American film producer, screenwriter, editor and director

== See also ==
- Chas Vincent (born 1977), American politician from Montana
