= Chuck Vincent =

Chuck Vincent may refer to:

- Chuck Vincent (basketball)
- Chuck Vincent (director)

== See also ==
- Charles Vincent (disambiguation)
