= 2006 Louisville Cardinals football team =

American college football season

2006 Louisville Cardinals football

Big East champion Lambert-Meadowlands Trophy Orange Bowl champion

Orange Bowl, W 24–13 vs. Wake Forest
- Conference: Big East Conference

Ranking
- Coaches: No. 7
- AP: No. 6
- Record: 12–1 (6–1 Big East)
- Head coach: Bobby Petrino (4th season)
- Offensive coordinator: Paul Petrino (4th season)
- Offensive scheme: Multiple
- Defensive coordinator: Mike Cassity (3rd season)
- Base defense: 4–3
- Home stadium: Papa John's Cardinal Stadium

2006 Big East Conference football standings
	Conf.			Overall
Team	W		L	W		L
No. 6 Louisville $	6	–	1	12	–	1
No. 10 West Virginia	5	–	2	11	–	2
No. 12 Rutgers	5	–	2	11	–	2
South Florida	4	–	3	9	–	4
Cincinnati	4	–	3	8	–	5
Pittsburgh	2	–	5	6	–	6
Connecticut	1	–	6	4	–	8
Syracuse	1	–	6	4	–	8
$ – BCS representative as conference champion; Rankings from AP Poll

The 2006 Louisville Cardinals football team represented the University of Louisville in the 2006 NCAA Division I FBS football season. The team, led by Bobby Petrino in his fourth year at the school, played their home games in Papa John's Cardinal Stadium. Playing in their second year in the Big East Conference, the team finished the regular season with eleven wins and one loss and were conference champions. They represented the Big East in the 2007 Orange Bowl and with the win ended the season with a 12–1 record. The team ended the season ranked sixth in the nation.

== Preseason ==
The Cardinals finished the 2005 season with a 9–3 record, including a loss in the Gator Bowl. After the loss, they were ranked 19th in the nation. Returning eight starters from their 2005 offense, including Brian Brohm and Michael Bush and nine starters on a defense that allowed 320 yards a game the team was picked, by the Big East media, to finish second in the conference.

=== Coaching changes ===
After assistant coach Tony Levine left the Cardinals for a job in the NFL, he was replaced as special teams coordinator and outside linebackers coach by Tom McMahon. McMahon had eight years of assistant coaching experience at Utah State. Also added to the staff as a new assistant strength coach was Bryan Dermody.

=== Roster changes ===
Although returning 17 starters from 2005, the team lost other key players to the 2006 NFL draft. Four players were taken in the draft, three of which were defensive starters. From the offense, offensive guard Jason Spitz was taken in the third round by Green Bay. From the defense, end Elvis Dumervil was taken by Denver, linebacker Brandon Johnson by Arizona and tackle Montavious Stanley by Dallas.

=== Recruiting ===
The Cardinals signed 25 recruits for the new class. Included in the top-40 class were three four-star recruits on offense, a five-star recruit on defense, and another four four-star recruits on defense.

College recruiting (2006)
Name	Hometown	School	Height	Weight	40^{‡}	Commit date
Jeffrey Adams; OL	Cadiz, Kentucky	Trigg Co HS	6 ft 7 in (2.01 m)	328 lb (149 kg)	5.45	Jan 5, 2006
Jeffrey Adams; OL	Recruit ratings: Scout: Rivals: (77)					
Anthony Allen; RB	Tampa, Florida	Jesuit HS	6 ft 0 in (1.83 m)	215 lb (98 kg)	4.55	Jul 24, 2005
Anthony Allen; RB	Recruit ratings: Scout: Rivals: (75)					
Jeremy Baker; OL	West Palm Beach, Florida	Palm Beach Lakes HS	6 ft 4 in (1.93 m)	335 lb (152 kg)	5.62	Dec 18, 2005
Jeremy Baker; OL	Recruit ratings: Scout: Rivals: (71)					
Josh Chichester; WR	West Chester Township, Butler County, Ohio	Lakota West HS	6 ft 8 in (2.03 m)	207 lb (94 kg)	4.7	Jan 28, 2006
Josh Chichester; WR	Recruit ratings: Scout: Rivals: (79)					
Kareem Crowell; DT	Tallahassee, Florida	Amos P. Godby HS	6 ft 4 in (1.93 m)	287 lb (130 kg)	5.18	Jan 26, 2006
Kareem Crowell; DT	Recruit ratings: Scout: Rivals: (75)					
Demetrius Culpepper; DE	Alexander City, Alabama	Benjamin Russell HS	6 ft 4 in (1.93 m)	225 lb (102 kg)	4.76	Jan 23, 2006
Demetrius Culpepper; DE	Recruit ratings: Scout: Rivals: (40)					
Emanuel Francis; QB	Tallahassee, Florida	Amos P. Godby HS	6 ft 3 in (1.91 m)	187 lb (85 kg)	NA	Feb 1, 2006
Emanuel Francis; QB	Recruit ratings: Scout: Rivals: (69)					
Rodney Gnat; DE	Jacksonville, Florida	Samuel W. Wilson HS	6 ft 4 in (1.93 m)	224 lb (102 kg)	4.67	Dec 12, 2005
Rodney Gnat; DE	Recruit ratings: Scout: Rivals: (74)					
Josh Hawkins; OL	Greenville, Alabama	Greenville HS	6 ft 7 in (2.01 m)	315 lb (143 kg)	5.45	Nov 27, 2005
Josh Hawkins; OL	Recruit ratings: Scout: Rivals: (72)					
Brandon Heath; S	West Palm Beach, Florida	Palm Beach Lakes HS	6 ft 0 in (1.83 m)	191 lb (87 kg)	4.6	Feb 1, 2006
Brandon Heath; S	Recruit ratings: Scout: Rivals: (83)					
Aundre Henderson; DT	Louisville, Kentucky	Dupont Manual HS	6 ft 3 in (1.91 m)	289 lb (131 kg)	5.32	Dec 21, 2005
Aundre Henderson; DT	Recruit ratings: Scout: Rivals: (79)					
Hector Hernandez; OL	Naples, Florida	Naples HS	6 ft 4 in (1.93 m)	265 lb (120 kg)	5.37	Jan 30, 2006
Hector Hernandez; OL	Recruit ratings: Scout: Rivals: (40)					
Ryan Kessling; OL	Tallahassee, Florida	Lawton Chiles HS	6 ft 6 in (1.98 m)	275 lb (125 kg)	NA	Dec 15, 2005
Ryan Kessling; OL	Recruit ratings: Scout: Rivals: (40)					
Zachary Meagher; TE	Cincinnati, Ohio	Glen Este HS	6 ft 4 in (1.93 m)	247 lb (112 kg)	4.7	Jun 9, 2005
Zachary Meagher; TE	Recruit ratings: Scout: Rivals: (73)					
Pete Nochta; TE	Lexington, Kentucky	Tates Creek HS	6 ft 6 in (1.98 m)	226 lb (103 kg)	4.8	Dec 18, 2005
Pete Nochta; TE	Recruit ratings: Scout: Rivals: (40)					
Troy Pascley; WR	Alliance, Ohio	Alliance HS	6 ft 2 in (1.88 m)	186 lb (84 kg)	4.45	Jul 25, 2005
Troy Pascley; WR	Recruit ratings: Scout: Rivals: (78)					
Johnny Patrick; WR	DeLand, Florida	DeLand HS	6 ft 0 in (1.83 m)	180 lb (82 kg)	4.4	Dec 18, 2005
Johnny Patrick; WR	Recruit ratings: Scout: Rivals: (40)					
Eugene Sowell; LB	Irondale, Alabama	Shades Valley HS	6 ft 0 in (1.83 m)	207 lb (94 kg)	4.54	Nov 10, 2005
Eugene Sowell; LB	Recruit ratings: Scout: Rivals: (76)					
Conrad Thomas; OL	Douglasville, Georgia	Douglas County HS	6 ft 6 in (1.98 m)	338 lb (153 kg)	5.4	Dec 19, 2005
Conrad Thomas; OL	Recruit ratings: Scout: Rivals: (53)					
Latarrius Thomas; WR	New Smyrna Beach, Florida	New Smyran Beach HS	6 ft 1 in (1.85 m)	201 lb (91 kg)	4.65	Jan 27, 2006
Latarrius Thomas; WR	Recruit ratings: Scout: Rivals: (NA)					
L.T. Walker; DT	Wynne, Arkansas	Wynne HS	6 ft 3 in (1.91 m)	308 lb (140 kg)	5.16	Jan 27, 2006
L.T. Walker; DT	Recruit ratings: Scout: Rivals: (67)					
Deantwan Whitehead; DE	Birmingham, Alabama	West End HS	6 ft 6 in (1.98 m)	245 lb (111 kg)	4.67	Jan 31, 2006
Deantwan Whitehead; DE	Recruit ratings: Scout: Rivals: (80)					
Willie Williams; DT	Milledgeville, Georgia	Georgia Military (JC)	6 ft 4 in (1.93 m)	325 lb (147 kg)	4.94	Dec 18, 2005
Willie Williams; DT	Recruit ratings: Scout: Rivals: (NA)					
Tyler Wimsatt; LB	Owensboro, Kentucky	Owensboro HS	6 ft 2 in (1.88 m)	224 lb (102 kg)	4.55	Dec 23, 2005
Tyler Wimsatt; LB	Recruit ratings: Scout: Rivals: (NA)					
Tyler Wolfe; QB	Central City, Louisiana	Central HS	6 ft 5 in (1.96 m)	190 lb (86 kg)	NA	Jan 25, 2006
Tyler Wolfe; QB	Recruit ratings: Scout: Rivals: (NA)					
Overall recruit ranking: Scout: #26 Rivals: #34
‡ Refers to 40-yard dash; Note: In many cases, Scout, Rivals, 247Sports, On3, and ESPN may conflict in their listings of height, weight and 40 time.; In these cases, the average was taken. ESPN grades are on a 100-point scale.; Sources: "Louisville Commit List 2006". Rivals.; "Scout.com Football Recruiting: Louisville". Scout.; "2006 Player Commitments – Louisville". ESPN.; "Scout.com Team Recruiting Rankings". Scout.; "2006 Team Ranking". Rivals.com.

=== Preseason honors ===
Five Cardinals' players were honored as part of pre-season watchlists for national awards.

- Brian Brohm – Maxwell Award, Walter Camp Award, and Davey O'Brien Award
- Michael Bush – Maxwell Award and Walter Camp Award
- Art Carmody – Lou Groza Award
- Nate Harris – Dick Butkus Award
- Eric Wood – Outland Trophy and Rimington Trophy

== Schedule ==
Date	Time	Opponent	Rank	Site	TV	Result	Attendance
September 3	8:00 pm	Kentucky*	No. 13	Papa John's Cardinal Stadium; Louisville, Kentucky (Governor's Cup)	ESPN	W 59–28	42,597
September 9	12:00 pm	at Temple*	No. 13	Lincoln Financial Field; Philadelphia	WHAS	W 62–0	16,015
September 16	3:30 pm	No. 17 Miami (FL)*	No. 12	Papa John's Cardinal Stadium; Louisville, Kentucky (rivalry)	ABC	W 31–7	42,704
September 23	12:00 pm	at Kansas State*	No. 8	Bill Snyder Family Football Stadium; Manhattan, Kansas	FSN	W 24–6	45,855
October 6	8:00 pm	at Middle Tennessee*	No. 8	LP Field; Nashville, Tennessee	ESPN2	W 44–17	32,797
October 14	3:30 pm	Cincinnati^{†}	No. 7	Papa John's Cardinal Stadium; Louisville, Kentucky (Keg of Nails)	ESPNU	W 23–17	41,549
October 21	12:00 pm	at Syracuse	No. 6	Carrier Dome; Syracuse, New York	ESPN+	W 28–13	35,708
November 2	7:30 pm	No. 3 West Virginia	No. 5	Papa John's Cardinal Stadium; Louisville, Kentucky	ESPN	W 44–34	43,217
November 9	7:30 pm	at No. 15 Rutgers	No. 3	Rutgers Stadium; Piscataway, New Jersey	ESPN	L 25–28	44,111
November 18	7:30 pm	South Florida	No. 10	Papa John's Cardinal Stadium; Louisville, Kentucky	ESPNU	W 31–8	40,348
November 25	7:00 pm	at Pittsburgh	No. 8	Heinz Field; Pittsburgh	ESPN	W 48–24	41,881
December 2	12:00 pm	Connecticut	No. 6	Papa John's Cardinal Stadium; Louisville, Kentucky	ESPN	W 48–17	38,476
January 2	8:00 pm	vs. No. 15 Wake Forest*	No. 5	Dolphin Stadium; Miami Gardens, Florida (Orange Bowl)	FOX	W 24–13	74,470
*Non-conference game; ^{†}Homecoming; Rankings from AP Poll released prior to the game; All times are in Eastern time

== Game summaries ==
=== Kentucky ===
	1	2	3	4	Total
Wildcats	0	14	7	7	28
#13 Cardinals	14	17	14	14	59

The Cardinals opened their season against in-state rivals the Kentucky Wildcats, playing for the Governor's Cup. Kentucky, led by fourth year coach Rich Brooks and quarterback Andre' Woodson, came into the game not having beaten the Cardinals in four years. Louisville took an early lead with three Michael Bush touchdown runs in the first half, added to a touchdown pass by Brian Brohm and a field goal by Art Carmody. Woodson threw a pair of touchdown passes at the end of the half to bring the teams into halftime with the Cardinals leading 31–14. On their first possession of the second half, Michael Bush, already having 124 yards rushing, was injured. It was eventually revealed that he had broken his leg and would be out for the rest of the season. Despite the loss of Bush, the Cardinals still managed to score four more touchdowns in the game, including two by his replacement, George Stripling. With another long touchdown pass by Woodson and a kickoff return for a touchdown by Keenan Burton, the game ended with the Cardinals winning 59–28. With the win, the Cardinals moved up a spot to 12th in the nation.

=== Temple ===
	1	2	3	4	Total
#12 Cardinals	14	28	7	13	62
Owls	0	0	0	0	0

The Cardinals next went on the road to face the Temple Owls led by second-year head coach Al Golden and quarterback Adam Dimichele. The Cardinals scored early and often with 5 rushing touchdowns in the first half added to a 57-yard passing touchdown by Brohm to give them a 42–0 lead at halftime. The second half wasn't better for the Owls, still failing to score and giving up two more rushing touchdowns and a pair of field goals by Art Carmody. When the game was over the Cardinals won 62–0 and had amassed 671 total yards of offense. After the game, Louisville kept their number 12 ranking.

=== Miami (FL) ===
	1	2	3	4	Total
#15 Hurricanes	7	0	0	0	7
#12 Cardinals	0	10	14	7	31

The Cardinals first big test of the year came against the 15th ranked Miami Hurricanes, led by sixth year head coach Larry Coker and quarterback Kyle Wright. Louisville had never beaten the Hurricanes before in 10 previous meetings. Prior to the game, Hurricane players came to midfield to stomp on the Cardinals logo, causing a small altercation. Early, Louisville's strong offense struggled against the powerful Miami defense, a defense that had only given up 200 yards a game. Miami scored first on a rushing touchdown, but would be unable to score again. The Cardinals, led by Brohm, scored on a field goal and a long touchdown pass to take a 10–7 lead at halftime. In the third quarter, Brohm injured his thumb and would be taken out of the game. It was later reported that he would be out for four to six weeks. His loss didn't stop the Cardinals offense though, with running back Kolby Smith scoring two rushing touchdowns in the third quarter, and Brohm's replacement, Hunter Cantwell, throwing another touchdown in the fourth to bring the final score to 31–7 in favor of the Cardinals. Although they had been averaging over 600 yards per game, the Cardinals were held to 382, but it was enough to defeat the Hurricanes. After the game the Cardinals moved to 9th in the nation, while the Hurricanes dropped out of the polls for the first time since 1999.

=== Kansas State ===
	1	2	3	4	Total
#9 Cardinals	7	3	7	7	24
Wildcats	0	0	0	6	6

The Cardinals next faced the Kansas State Wildcats on the road. The Wildcats, led by first-year head coach Ron Prince and quarterback duo Josh Freeman and Dylan Meier, were 3–0. They had the number 14th ranked defense in total yards in the nation and had not given up an offensive touchdown since their first game. However, the Cardinals first possession, a 97-yard drive that ended with Cantwell throwing a 19-yard touchdown pass, ended the streak. Though the Cardinals struggled moving the ball for the rest of the half, even turning the ball over a few times, they were able to score on a field goal by Art Carmody to take a 10–0 lead to the half. In the second half, Louisville was able to score on a pair of runs to take a 24–0 lead, but Kansas State finally got on the board with a 69-yard run by Thomas Clayton. After a failed two-point conversion attempt, neither team could score again and Louisville won 24–6. Their offense, ranked first in the nation in total yards with 563 per game, was once again held for under 400 yards. With the win, the Cardinals moved to eighth in the rankings.

=== Middle Tennessee ===
	1	2	3	4	Total
#8 Cardinals	10	13	7	14	44
Blue Raiders	10	0	0	7	17

The Cardinals next went on the road to face the Middle Tennessee Blue Raiders, led by first-year head coach Rick Stockstill and quarterback Clint Marks. The Cardinals scored on an early field goal, but the Blue Raiders took the lead when Damon Nickson returned the ensuing kickoff 88 yards for a touchdown. After a field goal by the Blue Raiders gave them a 10–3 lead, the Cardinals opened up the scoring with two more field goals and a pair of touchdown passes by Hunter Cantwell to Mario Urrutia. At halftime the Cardinals led 23–10. In the second half, Cantwell threw another touchdown and Kolby Smith and Anthony Allen both ran for touchdowns for the Cardinals. Clint Marks threw a touchdown in the fourth quarter, but it was too late for the comeback, giving the Cardinals a 44–17 win. With the win, the Cardinals moved up to seventh in the rankings.

=== Cincinnati ===
	1	2	3	4	Total
Bearcats	3	7	0	7	17
#7 Cardinals	0	13	7	3	23

The Cardinals next started their Big East schedule playing the Cincinnati Bearcats in a homecoming game. The Bearcats, led by third-year head coach Mark Dantonio and quarterback Dustin Grutza, though struggling with a 3–3 record on the season, had played number 1 ranked Ohio State and highly ranked Virginia Tech, and had held early leads on both. Cardinal quarterback, Brian Brohm returned from his thumb injury, but struggled in the first half. The Bearcats took an early lead on a field goal and after the Cardinals tied the game, took another lead with a touchdown pass by Grutza. The Cardinals were able to score twice at the end of the half, including on a 1-yard pass by Brohm, to take a 13–10 lead to halftime. After the half, the Cardinals scored on an Anthony Allen rush and another field goal by Art Carmody to have a 23–10 lead in the fourth quarter. Grutza threw another touchdown pass with four minutes left in the game and had a chance win with another pass in the endzone, however it was knocked down by Cardinal cornerback Gavin Smart to preserve the win. The Cardinals won 23–17 and continued their 15-game home winning streak. With the win, the Cardinals moved to sixth in the nation.

=== Syracuse ===
	1	2	3	4	Total
#6 Cardinals	0	7	7	14	28
Orange	0	6	0	7	13

The Cardinals next went to Syracuse to face the Orange. The Orange, led by second-year head coach Greg Robinson and quarterback Perry Patterson, were looking for their first conference win in two years. Though both teams struggled to move the ball in the first quarter, the Orange took the first lead with two field goals in the second quarter. However, just before the half, the Cardinals took the ball on an 80-yard drive that culminated in a 2-yard touchdown by Anthony Allen. With the score, the Cardinals took a 7–6 lead to the half. In the third quarter the only score allowed was on a 5-yard run by Kolby Smith for the Cardinals. Later in the fourth quarter, Allen scored his second touchdown to give the Cardinals a 21–6 lead. Patterson was finally able to connect with Mike Williams for a 37-yard touchdown to bring the Orange to within 8. The Orange looked ready to attempt to tie the game when the Cardinals bobbled the ensuing kickoff and were pinned at their own 7, however, the Cardinals went on a 93-yard drive which was capped with another Smith touchdown run. With no time remaining, the Cardinals won 28–13. With the win the Cardinals moved to fifth in the nation.

=== West Virginia ===
	1	2	3	4	Total
#3 Mountaineers	7	7	7	13	34
#5 Louisville	3	13	14	14	44

The Cardinals next had their biggest game of the season playing the third ranked West Virginia Mountaineers, led by sixth-year head coach Rich Rodriguez and quarterback Pat White. The game was hyped to be the Big East game of the year, after the epic 2005 game, and seemed that the winner would have national title hopes with both ranked in the top-5 in the country and both tied with Rutgers for the lead in the Big East. The Cardinals took an early lead with an Art Carmody field goal, but gave up a 42-yard touchdown run to Steve Slaton later in the quarter to give the Mountaineers a 7–3 lead at the end of the quarter. On their next drive, Carmody kicked another field goal for the Cardinals, and when their defense stopped the Mountaineers, the Cardinals took a lead on the next drive on an Anthony Allen touchdown. After a long kickoff return, Pat White ran for his own touchdown to give the Mountaineers the lead once again, however, Carmody kicked a third field goal before the half to give the Cardinals a 16–14 lead at halftime.

After both teams fumbled on their first drives to start the half, a second Slaton fumble was returned by Malik Jackson for a Cardinal touchdown. When their defense held the Mountaineers, a punt was returned 40-yards by Trent Guy for another Cardinal touchdown. White led the Mountaineers on a 92-yard drive capped by his second rushing touchdown to bring them with nine at the end of the third quarter. On the first play of the fourth quarter, though, Brohm connected with Mario Urrutia to give the Cardinals a 37–21 lead. White led the Mountaineers on another drive and scored his third rushing touchdown of the day, but Allen answered for the Cardinals with his second touchdown to give them a 17-point lead with 12 minutes left in the game. After both teams had turnovers, White scored his fourth rushing touchdown with two minutes left in the game. After a failed onside kick, the Mountaineers were able to stop the Cardinals, but it was too late, as time ran out on the Mountaineer drive. The Cardinals won the game 44–34, and remained tied for the Big East Conference lead. After the game, the Mountaineers dropped to tenth in the rankings, and the Cardinals moved up to fourth.

=== Rutgers ===
	1	2	3	4	Total
#4 Cardinals	15	10	0	0	25
#14 Scarlet Knights	7	7	8	6	28

The Cardinals next went to Rutgers to face the undefeated, 14th ranked Scarlet Knights, led by sixth year head coach Greg Schiano and quarterback Mike Teel. The winner of the game, which was billed as the biggest game ever at Rutgers, would take the lead in the Big East. The Cardinals took the first lead halfway through the first quarter with an Anthony Allen rushing touchdown, but Teel tied the game for the Knights on a 26-yard touchdown pass. On the ensuing kickoff, however, Jajuan Spillman returned the ball 100-yards for a touchdown to give the Cardinals a 15–7 lead at the end of the first quarter. Brohm then led the Cardinals on a pair of drives that ended in a touchdown and a field goal, before Ray Rice ran for his own touchdown to close out the half, with the Cardinals ahead 25–14. In the third quarter, Rice got his second touchdown, and after the two-point conversion, the Knights were within 3. After the Cardinals were unable to score on their first drive in the fourth quarter, the Knights tied the game on a Jeremy Ito field goal. Stopping the Cardinals once again, the Knights drove to the Louisville 16-yard line with 21 seconds remaining in the game. Ito attempted the winning field goal, but missed. However, the Cardinals were penalized for being offsides, and Ito's second attempt was good, giving the Knights a 28–25 win. Following the game, Rutgers was the only undefeated team in the Big East and led the conference. The Cardinals dropped to 12th in the nation and second place in the conference.

=== South Florida ===
	1	2	3	4	Total
Bulls	0	0	0	8	8
#12 Cardinals	0	10	14	7	31

The Cardinals next faced the South Florida Bulls, a team the Cardinals lost to in 2005. The Bulls were led by eleventh-year head coach Jim Leavitt and quarterback Matt Grothe. Though neither team could get their offenses moving early in the game, the Cardinals took the lead after a pair of drives ended with a Brohm touchdown pass and a Carmody field goal, taking a 10–0 lead into the half. In the third quarter, the Cardinals were able to score two more touchdowns on an Anthony Allen run and another Brohm pass. Although Grothe threw a 44-yard touchdown in the fourth and completed a two-point conversion, the Cardinals answered with another Allen rushing touchdown. The Cardinals got a 31–8 win, and, after Rutgers lost to Cincinnati, were once again in a three-way tie atop the Big East. After the win, the Cardinals moved up to eleventh in the nation.

=== Pittsburgh ===
	1	2	3	4	Total
#11 Cardinals	10	14	14	10	48
Panthers	14	3	0	7	24

The Cardinals next faced the Pittsburgh Panthers, led by second-year head coach Dave Wannstedt and quarterback Tyler Palko. The Cardinals opened the game with a 19-yard touchdown by Anthony Allen, but the Panthers answered with a pair of touchdowns to take the lead. Carmody's field goal, late in the first quarter, brought the Cardinals to within 4, and early in the second quarter they took the lead with a Brohm touchdown pass. The Panthers tied the game midway through the quarter, but Brohm's second touchdown pass gave the Cardinals a 24–17 lead at halftime. The third quarter consisted of two more Cardinal touchdowns to give them a 21-point lead, which was increased early in the fourth quarter with a Carmody field goal. Palko answered for the Panthers with a 21-yard touchdown pass, but Brohm stopped any chance of a comeback with a 75-yard touchdown pass later in the quarter, giving the Cardinals a 48–24 win. After the win, the Cardinals moved to seventh in the nation.

=== Connecticut ===
	1	2	3	4	Total
Huskies	3	7	0	7	17
#7 Cardinals	10	17	7	14	48

The Cardinals last regular season game was against the Connecticut Huskies, led by eighth-year head coach Randy Edsall and quarterback Matt Bonislawski. The Cardinals took an early lead on an Allen touchdown run. The Huskies scored on a field goal, but the Cardinals answered with their own field goal to keep a 7-point lead. In the second quarter, after Brohm threw a long touchdown, and the Huskies answered with a Lou Allen run, the Cardinals opened scoring with another touchdown pass by Brohm and a second field goal by Carmody. The Cardinals took a 27–10 lead into halftime. In the second half the Cardinals scored three times without being answered by the Huskies, including two more Brohm Touchdown passes and a second running touchdown by Anthony Allen. The Huskies finally scored again, late in the fourth quarter, on a run by Terry Cauley, however it was not enough and the Cardinals won, 48–17. With the win and Rutgers' loss to West Virginia, the Cardinals won the Big East and the conference's spot in the BCS. With the win, the Cardinals were ranked sixth in the BCS standings.

=== Orange Bowl ===
	1	2	3	4	Total
#6 Cardinals	0	10	0	14	24
#15 Demon Deacons	0	3	7	3	13

Winning the Big East, the Cardinals were invited to the Orange Bowl to face the ACC champion and No. 15 ranked Wake Forest Demon Deacons. The Deacons were led by fifth-year head coach Jim Grobe and quarterback Riley Skinner. The Deacons took an early lead with a field goal, however the Cardinals answered with their own field goal and a touchdown in the first quarter to take a 10–3 lead to halftime. In the third quarter, Skinner tied the game on a 30-yard touchdown pass and took a three-point lead in the fourth after a 36-yard field goal. The lead didn't last long though, as the Cardinals scored a quick touchdown on a rush by Anthony Allen and another one later in the quarter on a rush by Brock Bolen. With the scores the Cardinals took a 24–13 win, their first in a BCS bowl game.

=== Rankings ===
Ranking movements Legend: ██ Increase in ranking ██ Decrease in ranking
	Week															
Poll	Pre	1	2	3	4	5	6	7	8	9	10	11	12	13	14	Final
AP	13	13	12	8	8	8	7	6	6	5	3	10	8	6	5	6
Coaches	13	12	12	9	8	8	7	6	6	5	4	12	11	7	6	7
Harris	Not released				7	7	7	6	6	5	3	10	10	7	5	Not released
BCS	Not released							7	8	5	3	10	9	6	6	Not released

== Personnel ==
=== Roster ===
Wide receivers

- 3 Trent Guy – (redshirt) Freshman
- 4 Patrick Carter – Junior
- 7 Mario Urrutia – Sophomore
- 9 Chris Vaughn – Sophomore
- 22 Andrew Robinson – (redshirt) Freshman
- 26 JaJuan Spillman – Freshman
- 29 Johnny Patrick – Freshman
- 30 Latarrius Thomas – Freshman
- 80 Jimmy Riley – Senior
- 84 Scott Long – (redshirt) Freshman
- 85 Harry Douglas – Junior
- 86 Troy Pascley – Freshman
- 87 Corey Thompson – Sophomore
- 88 Dale Golsby – (redshirt) Freshman
- 89 Josh Chichester – Freshman

Centers

- 62 Nick Borgelt – Sophomore
- 77 Eric Wood – Sophomore

Offensive guards

- 63 Danny Barlowe – Junior
- 66 Mike Donoghue – (redshirt) Freshman
- 67 Jeremy Baker – Freshman
- 69 Marcel Benson – Junior
- 70 Conrad Thomas – Freshman
- 76 Kurt Quarterman – Senior

Offensive tackles

- 53 Michael Sturgeon – Senior
- 60 Hector Hernandez – Freshman
- 65 Josh Byrom – Freshman
- 68 George Bussey – Sophomore
- 71 Marcus Gordon – Junior
- 72 Brian Roche – (redshirt) Freshman
- 74 Jeffrey Adams – Freshman
- 75 Zach Taylor – Freshman
- 78 Breno Giacomini – Junior
- 79 Renardo Foster – Senior

Tight ends

- 44 Careg Bonner – (redshirt) Freshman
- 45 Zach Meagher – Freshman
- 49 Pete Nochta – Freshman
- 81 Scott Kuhn – Junior
- 82 Gary Barnidge – Junior
- 89 Rodney Carter – Sophomore

Quarterbacks

- 12 Brian Brohm – Junior
- 14 Hunter Cantwell – Sophomore
- 5 Jordan Tackett – Senior
- 17 Skylar Lear – (redshirt) Freshman
- 17 Tyler Wolfe – Freshman

Tailbacks

- 19 Michael Bush – Senior
- 24 George Stripling – Sophomore
- 28 Sergio Spencer – Sophomore
- 33 Kolby Smith – Senior
- 41 Eugene Sowell – Freshman
- 42 Anthony Allen – Freshman

Fullbacks

- 32 Brock Bolen – Sophomore
- 32 Quentin Diggs – (redshirt) Freshman
- 44 Jon Hardin – Senior
- 47 Deriontae Taylor – Junior
- 48 Joe Tronzo – (redshirt) Freshman

Defensive ends

- 8 Peanut Whitehead – Freshman
- 56 Michael Adams – (redshirt) Freshman
- 88 Brandon Cox – Junior
- 90 Johnnie Burns – Sophomore
- 95 Maurice Mitchell – Sophomore
- 96 Zach Anderson – Senior
- 97 Aundre Henderson – Freshman
- 98 Jonathan Holston – (redshirt) Freshman
- 99 Josh Williams – Junior

Defensive tackles

- 57 Earl Heyman – Sophomore
- 59 L.T. Walker – Freshman
- 70 Greg Bridwell – Senior
- 91 Amobi Okoye – Senior
- 92 Willie Williams – Junior
- 93 L.D. Scott – (redshirt) Freshman
- 94 Adrian Grady – Sophomore

Linebackers

- 6 Preston Smith – Junior
- 10 Nate Harris – Senior
- 11 Malik Jackson – Junior
- 22 Lamar Myles – Sophomore
- 39 Tyler Wimsatt – Freshman
- 43 Abe Brown – Senior
- 46 Terrance Butler – Junior
- 50 Josh McDonald – (redshirt) Freshman
- 52 Mozell Axson – Sophomore
- 54 Rashad Roberts – (redshirt) Freshman
- 55 Chase Floyd – Sophomore
- 58 Rodney Gnat – Freshman

Cornerbacks

- 1 Travis Norton – Sophomore
- 14 Rod Council – Sophomore
- 15 Craig James – Freshman
- 21 William Gay – Senior
- 27 Gavin Smart – Senior
- 34 Bobby Buchanan – Sophomore
- 37 Marcus Folmar – Sophomore

Safeties

- 2 Richard Raglin – Sophomore
- 5 Brandon Heath – Freshman
- 13 Jon Russell – Junior
- 20 Lamar Alston – Sophomore
- 23 Stephen Garr – (redshirt) Freshman
- 25 E.K. Sawyerr – (redshirt) Freshman
- 26 Daniel Covington – (redshirt) Freshman
- 31 Darius Mann – (redshirt) Freshman
- 31 Daniel Cameron – (redshirt) Freshman
- 35 Brandon Sharp – Senior
- 38 Deon Palmer – Junior

Long snappers

- 40 Dane Mattingly – Sophomore
- 51 Matt Webb – Senior

Punters

- 30 Gabe Mullane – (redshirt) Freshman

Place kickers

- 18 Art Carmody – Junior
- 36 Todd Flannery – Junior
- 45 Marc Zucconi – Sophomore
- 43 Justin Waltrip – (redshirt) Freshman

=== Coaching staff ===
The Cardinal team was coached by Bobby Petrino and his staff, most of whom were in their fourth year together. Tom McMahon was brought in this year to coach special teams and the outside linebackers.

Name	Position	Year at Louisville	Alma Mater (Year)
Bobby Petrino	Head coach	4th	Carroll College (1983)
Jeff Brohm	Quarterbacks	4th	Louisville (1993)
Mike Cassity	Defense Coordinator; Safeties	3rd	Kentucky (1976)
Reggie Johnson	Inside linebackers	4th	Louisville (1996)
Tom McMahon	Outside linebackers Special teams	1st	Carroll College (1992)
Greg Nord	Assistant head coach Running backs	12th	Kentucky (1980)
Paul Petrino	Offensive coordinator Wide receivers	7th	Carroll College (1990)
Mike Summers	Offensive line	4th	Georgetown (1978)
Joe Whitt Jr.	Recruiting coordinator Cornerbacks	4th	Auburn (2001)
Kevin Wolthausen	Co-defensive coordinator Defensive line	4th	Humboldt State (1981)

== After the season ==
=== Coaching changes ===
Almost a week after their victory in the Orange Bowl, head coach, Bobby Petrino, was offered and took the head coaching position with the NFL's Atlanta Falcons. Two days later, Steve Kragthorpe, former head coach for the Tulsa Golden Hurricane, was hired for the position.

=== Awards ===
==== Conference ====
After the season, the Big East media announced that seven Cardinals were named to the First Team All Big East, and four others were named to the Second Team. Included on the first team were Harry Douglas, Renardo Foster, Kurt Quarterman, George Bussey, Art Carmody, William Gay, and Amobi Okoye, who was a unanimous selection. The seven were the most in the league.

==== National ====
After the season, head coach Bobby Petrino and quarterback Brian Brohm were each honored as a finalist and semifinalist for prestigious national awards. Before leaving, Petrino was named as a finalist for the Liberty Mutual Coach of the Year award, and Brian Brohm was named as a semifinalist for the Davey O'Brien Award. Finally, kicker Art Carmody was honored as winner of the Lou Groza Award.

Included in the honors, three players were named to an All-America team. Carmody and Amobi Okoye were both named by the AP on their second team, while Kurt Quarterman was named to the third team.

=== Roster changes ===
In the 2007 NFL draft, four former Cardinal starters were selected. Amobi Okoye became the highest draft pick in school history when he was selected tenth in the draft by Houston. Michael Bush, who had a medical redshirt and was eligible for another year, decided to leave, and was selected in the fourth round by Oakland. Kolby Smith and William Gay were both selected in the fifth round, Smith by Kansas City and Gay by Pittsburgh.
