= Arthur Antoine =

Louisiana state legislator

Arthur Antoine was an American state legislator in Louisiana. He represented Saint Mary Parish in the Louisiana House of Representatives from 1872 to 1874 along with Isaac Sutton.

Charles Vincent documented him as having been born in Louisiana and "mulatto". He served on the Committee on Land and Levees as well.as the Committee on Pensions.
