= General Vincent =

General Vincent may refer to:

- Berkeley Vincent (1871–1963), British Army brigadier general
- Charles Humbert Marie Vincent (1753–1831), French general of the Revolution and the Empire
- Clinton D. "Casey" Vincent (1914–1955), U.S. Air Force brigadier general
- Douglas Vincent (Australian Army officer) (1916–1995), Australian Army major general
- Hal W. Vincent (1927–2015), U.S. Marine Corps major general
- John Vincent (British Army officer) (1764–1848), British Army major general
- Karl von Vincent (1757–1834), Habsburg Austrian Army general in the French Revolutionary Wars
- Richard Vincent, Baron Vincent of Coleshill (1931–2018), British Army general
- Strong Vincent (1837–1863), Union Army brigadier general
