= 2006 Connecticut Huskies football team =

American college football season

2006 Connecticut Huskies football
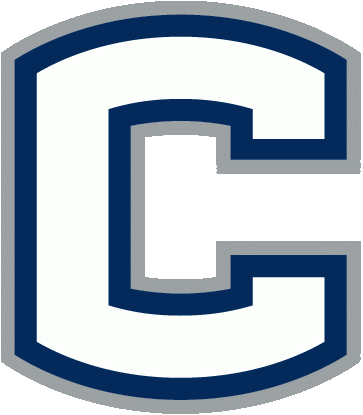
- Conference: Big East Conference
- Record: 4–8 (1–6 Big East)
- Head coach: Randy Edsall (8th season)
- Offensive coordinator: Rob Ambrose (1st season)
- Offensive scheme: Multiple
- Defensive coordinator: Todd Orlando (2nd season)
- Base defense: 3–4
- Home stadium: Rentschler Field

2006 Big East Conference football standings
	Conf.			Overall
Team	W		L	W		L
No. 6 Louisville $	6	–	1	12	–	1
No. 10 West Virginia	5	–	2	11	–	2
No. 12 Rutgers	5	–	2	11	–	2
South Florida	4	–	3	9	–	4
Cincinnati	4	–	3	8	–	5
Pittsburgh	2	–	5	6	–	6
Connecticut	1	–	6	4	–	8
Syracuse	1	–	6	4	–	8
$ – BCS representative as conference champion; Rankings from AP Poll

The 2006 Connecticut Huskies football team represented the University of Connecticut as a member of the Big East Conference during the 2006 NCAA Division I FBS football season. Led by eighth-year head coach Randy Edsall, the Huskies compiled an overall record of 4–8 with a mark of 1–6 in conference play, tying for seventh place at the bottom of the Big East standings. The team played home games at Rentschler Field in East Hartford, Connecticut.

== Schedule ==
Date	Time	Opponent	Site	TV	Result	Attendance
August 31	7:30 pm	Rhode Island*	Rentschler Field; East Hartford, CT (rivalry)		W 52–7	36,227
September 16	12:00 pm	Wake Forest*	Rentschler Field; East Hartford, CT		L 13–24	40,000
September 23	3:30 pm	at Indiana*	Memorial Stadium; Bloomington, IN		W 14–7	27,256
September 30	12:00 pm	Navy*	Rentschler Field; East Hartford, CT		L 17–41	40,000
October 7	7:00 pm	at South Florida	Raymond James Stadium; Tampa, FL		L 16–38	30,010
October 14	12:00 pm	Army*	Rentschler Field; East Hartford, CT	ESPN Plus	W 21–7	38,834
October 20	8:00 pm	No. 4 West Virginia^{†}	Rentschler Field; East Hartford, CT	ESPN	L 11–37	40,000
October 29	8:00 pm	at No. 16 Rutgers	Rutgers Stadium; Piscataway, NJ	ESPN	L 13–24	41,077
November 11	3:30 pm	Pittsburgh	Rentschler Field; East Hartford, CT	ESPN Plus	W 46–45 ^{2OT}	40,000
November 18	12:00 pm	at Syracuse	Carrier Dome; Syracuse, NY (rivalry)		L 14–20	35,079
November 25	12:00 pm	Cincinnati	Rentschler Field; East Hartford, CT		L 23–26	37,515
December 2	12:00 pm	at No. 7 Louisville	Papa John's Cardinal Stadium; Louisville, KY	ESPN	L 17–48	38,476
*Non-conference game; ^{†}Homecoming; Rankings from AP Poll released prior to the game; All times are in Eastern time

== After the season ==
=== NFL draft ===
The following Husky was selected in the 2007 NFL draft following the season.

Round	Pick	Player	Position	NFL club
6	195	Deon Anderson	Running back	Dallas Cowboys
