= Kory Bailey =

American football player (born 1979)

No. 82
- Position: Wide receiver

Personal information
- Born: March 31, 1979 (age 47); Durham, North Carolina, U.S.
- Listed height: 6 ft 1 in (1.85 m)
- Listed weight: 195 lb (88 kg)

Career information
- High school: Northern (Durham)
- College: North Carolina (1998–2001)
- NFL draft: 2002: undrafted

Career history
- New York Jets (2002)*; Edmonton Eskimos (2003)
- * Offseason or practice squad member only

Awards and highlights
- Grey Cup champion (2003)

Kory Bailey (born March 31, 1979) is an American former football wide receiver. He played college football at North Carolina, and professionally in the Canadian Football League (CFL).

== Early life ==
Kory Bailey was born on March 31, 1979, in Durham, North Carolina. He played high school football at Northern High School in Durham. As a senior, he caught 34 passes for 641 yards and eight touchdowns. Bailey also tied a state single-season record with six punt return touchdowns, earning first-team all-state honors as a return specialist.

== College career ==
Bailey was a four-year letterman for the North Carolina Tar Heels from 1998 to 2001. As a freshman in 1998, he set school single-season freshman records in receptions with 38 and receiving touchdowns with four. He also led the Atlantic Coast Conference in yards per kick return with 29.5. In 1999, Bailey led the team in all-purpose yards with 695. He finished his college career with totals of 139 catches for 1,939 yards and 14 touchdowns, 27 kick returns for 632 yards and one touchdown, and 29 punt returns for 247 yards. He majored in communications at North Carolina.

== Professional career ==
After going undrafted in the 2002 NFL draft, Bailey signed with the New York Jets on April 26, 2002. He was released on August 31, 2002.

Bailey signed with the Edmonton Eskimos of the Canadian Football League on April 1, 2003. He began the regular season on the practice roster, but was promoted to the active roster after an injury to Jason Tucker. He dressed in six games overall for the Eskimos during the 2003 season, catching 12 passes for 153 yards and two touchdowns. On November 16, 2003, the Eskimos won the 91st Grey Cup against the Montreal Alouettes by a score of 34–22. Bailey was released on June 12, 2004, after Edmonton signed Mookie Mitchell.
