= Josh Gattis =

American football player and coach (born 1984)

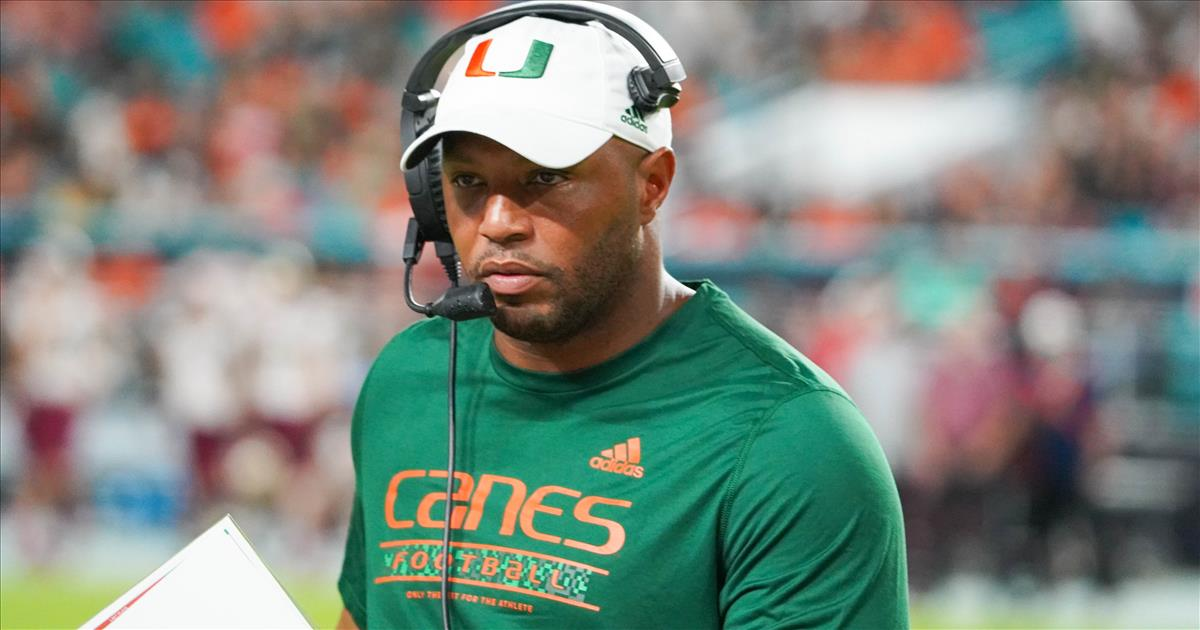

Syracuse Orange
- Title: Wide receivers coach

Personal information
- Born: January 15, 1984 (age 42); Durham, North Carolina, U.S.
- Listed height: 6 ft 1 in (1.85 m)
- Listed weight: 206 lb (93 kg)

Career information
- High school: Northern Durham (Durham, North Carolina)
- College: Wake Forest
- NFL draft: 2007: 5th round, 150th overall pick

Career history

Playing
- Jacksonville Jaguars (2007)*; Chicago Bears (2007–2008)
- * Offseason or practice squad member only

Coaching
- North Carolina (2010) Graduate assistant; Western Michigan (2011) Wide receivers coach; Vanderbilt (2012–2013) Wide receivers coach & offensive recruiting coordinator; Penn State (2014–2017) Passing game coordinator, offensive recruiting coordinator & wide receivers coach; Alabama (2018) Co-offensive coordinator & wide receivers coach; Michigan (2019–2021) Offensive coordinator & wide receivers coach; Miami (FL) (2022) Offensive coordinator & wide receivers coach; Maryland (2023–2024) Offensive coordinator & wide receivers coach; Syracuse (2025–present) Wide receivers coach

Awards and highlights
- As a player: First-team All-ACC (2006); Second-team All-ACC (2005); As a coach: Broyles Award (2021)
- Stats at Pro Football Reference

Josh Gattis (born January 15, 1984) is an American college football coach and former defensive back. He is currently the wide receivers coach at Syracuse University.

== Playing career ==
Gattis was born in Durham, North Carolina. He played college football at Wake Forest as a safety. As a junior in 2005, he recorded five interceptions and 72 tackles, and was awarded second-team All-ACC. His senior year in 2006 was one of Wake's greatest seasons of all time, as the team won the ACC for the second time in school history and played in the school's first Orange Bowl. He recorded five interceptions and 82 tackles on the year, and was named first-team All-ACC.

Gattis was selected by the Jacksonville Jaguars in the fifth round of the 2007 NFL draft with the 150th overall pick. He was released and later signed with the Chicago Bears, where he played in five games and recorded one tackle in 2007.

== Coaching career ==
After serving as a graduate assistant under Butch Davis at North Carolina for one season, Gattis was hired as the wide receivers coach at Western Michigan in 2011. While on the Broncos staff, he coached consensus All-American wide receiver Jordan White.

In 2012, he was hired by Vanderbilt as wide receivers coach and offensive recruiting coordinator. Wide receiver Jordan Matthews was awarded first-team All-SEC in both years Gattis was wide receivers coach at Vanderbilt. Gattis followed head coach James Franklin as he moved from Vanderbilt to Penn State in 2014, and assumed the same role with the Nittany Lions.

On January 25, 2018, it was announced he had been hired as the wide receivers coach at Alabama. He served as co-offensive coordinator (with Mike Locksley) and wide receivers coach during the 2018 season at Alabama, helping to oversee the third-highest scoring offense in the country. In his role as wide receivers coach, he oversaw Jerry Jeudy, who became the second consensus All-American wide-out to be coached by Gattis, and first to win the Biletnikoff Award as the nation's best wide receiver.

On January 10, 2019, Gattis was hired to be the offensive coordinator at Michigan. In 2021, Gattis won the Broyles Award as the top assistant coach in college football, leading the Wolverines' offense to a Big Ten Conference Championship and an appearance in the College Football Playoff.

On February 9, 2022, Gattis was hired to be the offensive coordinator at the University of Miami Hurricanes. On January 27, 2023, it was announced Gattis had been fired by Miami.

On March 2, 2023, Gattis was hired to be the offensive coordinator at Maryland. After a disappointing 2024 season, which saw offensive struggles, Gattis was fired as offensive coordinator after serving two seasons in the position with Maryland.

In March 2025, Gattis was hired at Syracuse.
