= A. J. Davis (cornerback, born 1983) =

American football player (born 1983)

Profile
- Position: Cornerback

Personal information
- Born: May 29, 1983 (age 43); Durham, North Carolina, U.S.
- Listed height: 5 ft 10 in (1.78 m)
- Listed weight: 192 lb (87 kg)

Career information
- High school: Northern Durham (NC)
- College: North Carolina State
- NFL draft: 2007: 4th round, 105th overall pick

Career history
- Detroit Lions (2007)*; Cleveland Browns (2007–2008)*; Kansas City Chiefs (2008)*; Indianapolis Colts (2008)*; Houston Texans (2008–2009)*
- * Offseason or practice squad member only

A. J. Davis (born May 29, 1983) is an American former professional football cornerback who was selected by the Detroit Lions in the fourth round of the 2007 NFL draft. He played college football at North Carolina State. Davis was also a member of the Cleveland Browns, Kansas City Chiefs, Indianapolis Colts and Houston Texans.

== Early life ==
Davis attended Northern Durham High School. He played at both corner and wide receiver. He made 13 career interceptions, three of which were returned for touchdowns. As a senior, he made 42 receptions for 709 yards and nine touchdowns. He played in the 2002 U.S. Army All-American Bowl following his high school career. Davis was a Parade All-American cornerback at Northern Durham High School during his senior year, where he also competed as a receiver. Tom Lemming's Prep Football Report, a scouting service that also awarded Davis with first-team All-American honors, ranked him the top cornerback in the nation. The North Carolina High School Athletic Association (NCHSAA) named him as the Male Athlete of the Year for 2001–02.

TheInsiders.com rated Davis the 24th-best prospect in the nation, regardless of position and Prep Star/CBS SportsLine accorded him Top 125 Dream Team accolades as the third-best defensive back in the nation and the best defensive back in the Atlantic region. At the U.S. Army All-American Game, Davis was timed as the contest's fastest player, boasting a 4.28-second timing in the 40-yard dash. Rivals.com rated Davis the sixth-best cornerback in the national high school ranks.

== College career ==
Davis played college football for the NC State Wolfpack and made 23 starts out of 46 games played. He made 135 tackles, 1.5 Quarterback sack and 4 Interceptions during his college career. ALL-ACC Cornerback 2006. He was also an All-ACC member of the track team 2003 and 2004. He majored in communications.

== Professional career ==
Davis was selected by the Detroit Lions in the fourth round (105th overall) in the 2007 NFL draft. He was waived by the Lions but was then signed on September 3. He was released again on September 13. A day after his release from the Lions, Davis was signed to the Cleveland Browns on September 14, 2007. He spent the entire season on the practice squad and attended training camp with the Browns in 2008 before being waived during final cuts on August 30, 2008.

Davis was signed to the Kansas City Chiefs on October 1, 2008, after the team released cornerback Travarous Bain. He was released on October 28, 2008. Davis was signed to the Indianapolis Colts on November 5, 2008, after cornerback Brandon Sumrall was placed on the injured list. The Colts released Davis on November 14, only to re-sign him on November 19. He was released on December 12. Davis was signed to the Houston Texans on December 16, 2008. He signed a three-year extension on August 25, 2009, and was placed on injury reserve on September 7, 2009.

== Personal life ==
Davis resides in Durham, North Carolina.
