= 2007 Orange Bowl =

2007 FedEx Orange Bowl
- BCS Bowl Game; 73rd Orange Bowl
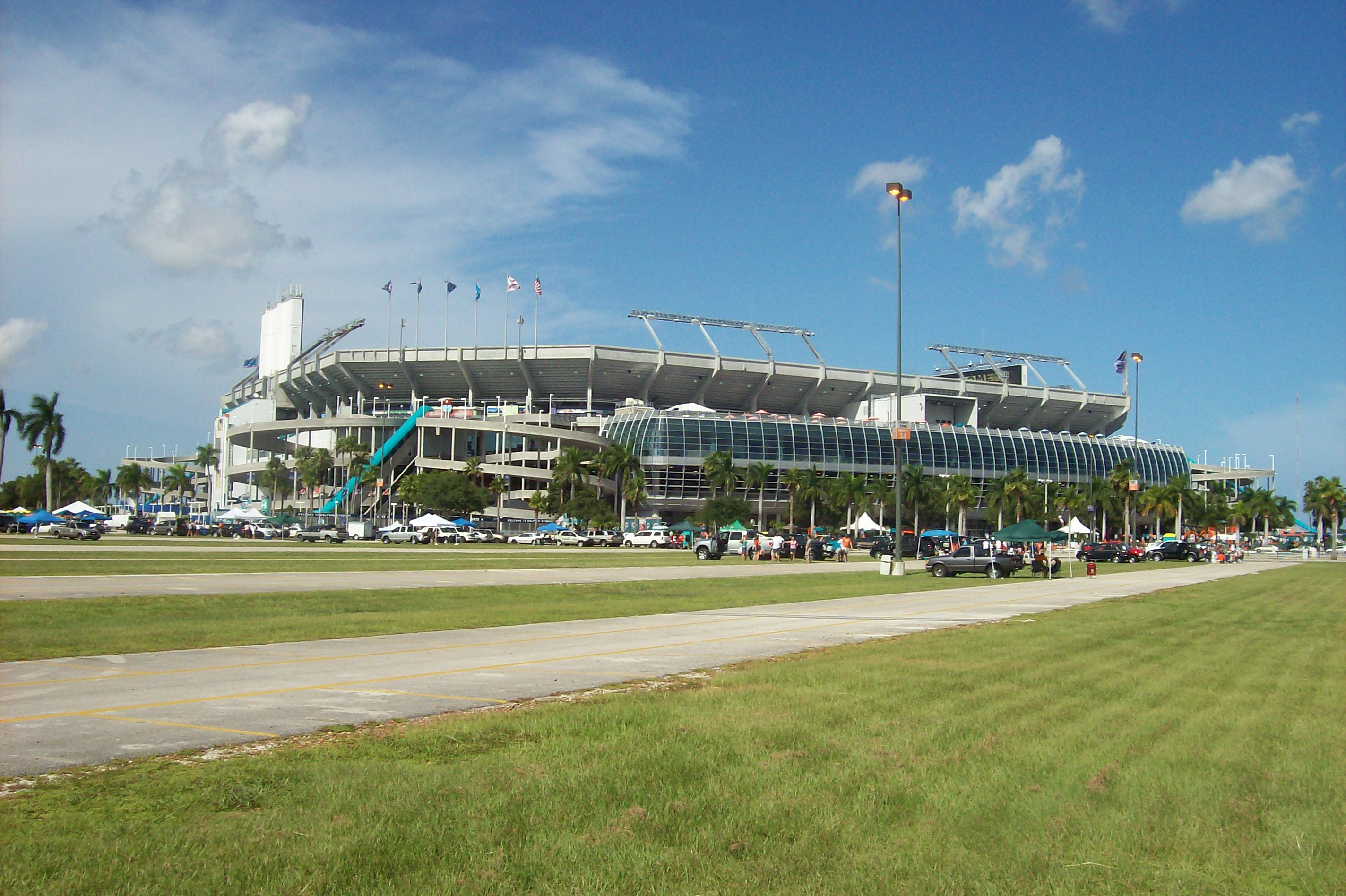
- Dolphin Stadium in Miami Gardens, Florida, hosted the Orange Bowl.
Louisville Cardinals	Wake Forest Demon Deacons
(11–1)	(11–2)
Big East	ACC
24	13
Head coach: Bobby Petrino	Head coach: Jim Grobe
AP / Coaches / BCS; 5 / 6 / 6	AP / Coaches / BCS; 15 / 15 / 14
	1	2	3	4	Total
Louisville	0	10	0	14	24
Wake Forest	0	3	7	3	13
- Date: January 2, 2007
- Season: 2006
- Stadium: Dolphin Stadium
- Location: Miami Gardens, Florida
- MVP: Brian Brohm
- Favorite: Louisville by 10 (53)
- National anthem: CeCe Winans
- Referee: Tom Ritter (SEC)
- Halftime show: Taylor Hicks and Gladys Knight
- Attendance: 74,470

United States TV coverage
- Network: Fox
- Announcers: Matt Vasgersian, Terry Donahue, and Pat Haden
- Nielsen ratings: 7.0

The 2007 FedEx Orange Bowl game was a college football Bowl Championship Series (BCS) bowl game following the 2006 NCAA Division I FBS football season. The game was played on January 2, 2007, at Dolphin Stadium in Miami Gardens, Florida. The game matched the No. 6 Louisville Cardinals versus the No. 15 Wake Forest Demon Deacons and was televised on Fox.

Each of the teams selected an honorary captain. Louisville chose boxing legend Muhammad Ali, a Louisville native, and Wake Forest chose golf great Arnold Palmer, a Wake alumnus. Dwyane Wade of the hometown Miami Heat presented the coin for the coin toss. The Orange Bowl Committee Chairman and President was Al Dotson Jr.

The officiating team was provided by the Southeastern Conference.

== Scoring summary ==
Scoring summary

Quarter	Time	Drive			Team	Scoring information	Score	
Quarter	Time	Plays	Yards	TOP	Team	Scoring information	UofL	WFU
2	14:17		1	2:11	WFU	44-yard field goal by Sam Swank	0	3
2	08:30		61	5:44	UofL	41-yard field goal by Art Carmody	3	3
2	05:53		47	0:38	UofL	Anthony Allen 21-yard touchdown reception from Patrick Carter, Art Carmody kick good	10	3
3	11:34		52	1:07	WFU	Nate Morton 30-yard touchdown reception from Riley Skinner, Sam Swank kick good	10	10
4	14:46		61	2:17	WFU	36-yard field goal by Sam Swank	10	13
4	12:31		81	2:06	UofL	Anthony Allen 1-yard touchdown run, Art Carmody kick good	17	13
4	04:57		71	5:26	UofL	Brock Bolen 18-yard touchdown run, Art Carmody kick good	24	13
"TOP" = time of possession. For other American football terms, see Glossary of American football.							24	13
