= Isaac Sutton =

Louisiana politician

Isaac Sutton was a laborer and state legislator in Louisiana. He represented St. Mary Parish from 1872 to 1876 in the Louisiana House of Representatives and from 1876 to 1880 in the Louisiana Senate.

He and Arthur Antoine were elected to the Louisiana House from the parish in 1872. He was on the committee to investigate the affairs of the New Orleans Gaslight Company and the Committee on Federal Relations. In the senate he served on the committee on Retrenchment and Reform.
