= Jim Grobe =

American football player and coach (born 1952)

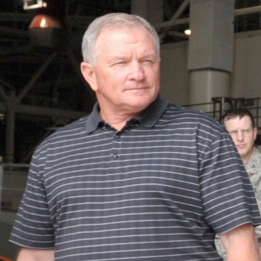
- Grobe in 2009

Biographical details
- Born: February 17, 1952 (age 74); Huntington, West Virginia, U.S.

Playing career
- 1971–1972: Ferrum
- 1973–1974: Virginia
- Positions: Guard, linebacker

Coaching career (HC unless noted)
- 1975: Virginia (GA)
- 1976–1977: Liberty HS (Bedford, VA)
- 1978: Emory & Henry (LB)
- 1979–1983: Marshall (LB)
- 1984–1994: Air Force (LB)
- 1995–2000: Ohio
- 2001–2013: Wake Forest
- 2016: Baylor
- 2019: San Antonio Commanders (DC)

Head coaching record
- Overall: 117–121–1 (college)
- Bowls: 4–2

Accomplishments and honors

Championships
- 1 ACC (2006)

Awards
- AP College Football Coach of the Year (2006); Bobby Dodd Coach of the Year Award (2006); Sporting News College Football COY (2006); MAC Coach of the Year (1996); ACC Coach of the Year (2006)

Jim Britt Grobe (born February 17, 1952) is an American college football coach and former player who was most recently the defensive coordinator of the San Antonio Commanders of the Alliance of American Football. His previous position to that was as head football coach at Baylor University. From 2001 to 2013, Grobe served as the head football coach at Wake Forest University. In 2006, he was named ACC Coach of the Year by a unanimous vote and AP Coach of the Year for coaching Wake Forest to an 11–2 regular season and the Atlantic Coast Conference (ACC) title.

== Playing career ==
Grobe earned his undergraduate degree (B.S.) in education from the University of Virginia in 1975 and earned a master's degree in guidance and counseling from Virginia in 1978. As a player at Virginia in 1973 and 1974, Grobe played middle guard (1973) and linebacker (1974). He was a two-year starter for the Virginia Cavaliers and was named Academic All-ACC.

Before enrolling at Virginia, Grobe spent two seasons with Ferrum College, then known as Ferrum Junior College, where he played linebacker on the undefeated Coastal Conference championship team. Grobe earned the Catlin Citizenship Award and the Big Green Award. In the fall of 2002, Grobe was inducted into the Ferrum College Hall of Fame.

== Coaching career ==
=== Ohio ===
Grobe obtained his first head coaching job in 1994 with Ohio University. He inherited a struggling program that went 0–11 the prior season. He guided the Bobcats to a 33–33–1 record over six seasons and won MAC coach of the year in 1996.

=== Wake Forest ===
==== 2006 season ====
In 2006, Grobe led Wake Forest to a school record 11 wins with a perfect 6–0 road record. His Wake Forest team also won the Atlantic Coast Conference championship by virtue of defeating Georgia Tech, 9–6, in the conference title game. The Demon Deacons earned their first trip to a BCS bowl game and played Louisville in the Orange Bowl. Grobe was named the ACC Coach of the Year, receiving 80 out of 80 votes from the league's media and making him the sixth Wake Forest coach to win the award. Grobe was also awarded the Bobby Dodd Coach of the Year Award and the AP Coach of the Year in 2006.

On February 27, 2007, Grobe signed a 10-year contract extension through 2016.

==== Resignation ====
Grobe resigned from Wake Forest on December 2, 2013.

=== Baylor ===
On May 30, 2016, Grobe was hired as Baylor's head coach for the 2016 season, coming out of semi-retirement. He made it known when he was brought on that he would not be a full time coach for the University, which had suspended and later terminated Art Briles due to the Baylor University sexual assault scandal. The Bears won their first six games before losing five in a row to close out the regular season. However, the Bears were invited to their seventh consecutive bowl game, the Motel 6 Cactus Bowl in Arizona. Baylor entered the game as heavy underdogs to the 10–2 Boise State Broncos, but the Bears rolled to an easy 31–12 victory. After the game, Grobe retired again.

=== San Antonio Commanders ===
In 2018, Grobe was named the defensive coordinator of the San Antonio Commanders of the Alliance of American Football. On April 2, 2019, the league's football operations suspended

== Family ==
Grobe and his wife Holly have two sons, Matt and Ben, and five grandchildren. Matt has been head men's golf coach at Marshall University since 2012. Ben has formerly served as Assistant Director of Football Operations at the University of North Carolina at Charlotte.

== Head coaching record ==
Year	Team	Overall	Conference	Standing	Bowl/playoffs	Coaches^{#}	AP^{°}
Ohio Bobcats (Mid-American Conference) (1995–2000)
1995	Ohio	2–8–1	1–6–1	9th			
1996	Ohio	6–6	5–3	4th			
1997	Ohio	8–3	6–2	T–2nd (East)			
1998	Ohio	5–6	5–3	T–3rd (East)			
1999	Ohio	5–6	5–3	T–3rd (East)			
2000	Ohio	7–4	5–3	T–3rd (East)			
Ohio:		33–33–1	27–20–1				
Wake Forest Demon Deacons (Atlantic Coast Conference) (2001–2013)
2001	Wake Forest	6–5	3–5	7th			
2002	Wake Forest	7–6	3–5	7th	W Seattle		
2003	Wake Forest	5–7	3–5	7th			
2004	Wake Forest	4–7	1–7	T–10th			
2005	Wake Forest	4–7	3–5	T–4th (Atlantic)			
2006	Wake Forest	11–3	6–2	1st (Atlantic)	L Orange^{†}	17	18
2007	Wake Forest	9–4	5–3	T–2nd (Atlantic)	W Meineke Car Care		
2008	Wake Forest	8–5	4–4	T–3rd (Atlantic)	W EagleBank		
2009	Wake Forest	5–7	3–5	4th (Atlantic)			
2010	Wake Forest	3–9	1–7	6th (Atlantic)			
2011	Wake Forest	6–7	5–3	T–2nd (Atlantic)	L Music City		
2012	Wake Forest	5–7	3–5	4th (Atlantic)			
2013	Wake Forest	4–8	2–6	6th (Atlantic)			
Wake Forest:		77–82	42–62				
Baylor Bears (Big 12 Conference) (2016)
2016	Baylor	7–6	3–6	T–6th	W Cactus		
Baylor:		7–6	3–6				
Total:		117–121–1					
National championship Conference title Conference division title or championship game berth
^{†}Indicates BCS bowl.; ^{#}Rankings from final Coaches Poll.; ^{°}Rankings from final AP Poll.
