= 2006 Wake Forest Demon Deacons football team =

American college football season

2006 Wake Forest Demon Deacons football

ACC champion ACC Atlantic Division champion

ACC Championship Game, W 9–6 vs. Georgia Tech

Orange Bowl, L 13–24 vs. Louisville
- Conference: Atlantic Coast Conference
- Atlantic Division

Ranking
- Coaches: No. 17
- AP: No. 18
- Record: 11–3 (6–2 ACC)
- Head coach: Jim Grobe (6th season)
- Offensive coordinator: Steed Lobotzke (4th season)
- Offensive scheme: Spread
- Defensive coordinator: Dean Hood (6th season)
- Base defense: 4–3
- Captain: Game captains
- Home stadium: Groves Stadium

2006 Atlantic Coast Conference football standings
	Conf.			Overall
Team	W		L	W		L
Atlantic Division
No. 18 Wake Forest x$	6	–	2	11	–	3
No. 20 Boston College	5	–	3	10	–	3
Maryland	5	–	3	9	–	4
Clemson	5	–	3	8	–	5
Florida State	3	–	5	7	–	6
NC State	2	–	6	3	–	9
Coastal Division
Georgia Tech x	7	–	1	9	–	5
No. 19 Virginia Tech	6	–	2	10	–	3
Virginia	4	–	4	5	–	7
Miami (FL)	3	–	5	7	–	6
North Carolina	2	–	6	3	–	9
Duke	0	–	8	0	–	12
Championship: Wake Forest 9, Georgia Tech 6
$ – BCS representative as conference champion; x – Division champion/co-champions; Rankings from AP Poll

The 2006 Wake Forest Demon Deacons football team represented Wake Forest University during the 2006 NCAA Division I FBS football season. The team was coached by Jim Grobe, in his fifth season at the school, and played its home games at Groves Stadium (now known as BB&T Field). The Deacons finished the regular season with a 10–2 record, giving them the first 10-win season in their history, and won the Atlantic Division of the Atlantic Coast Conference. The subsequent victory in the conference championship game gave Wake Forest their first conference championship in 36 years. As such, they represented the ACC in the Orange Bowl. The team ended the season with an 11–3 record and a number 17 ranking in the nation.

The team and its star linebacker Jon Abbate were the subject of a 2011 feature film, The 5th Quarter. Wake Forest would not win the ACC's Atlantic Division again until 2021.

== Schedule ==
Date	Time	Opponent	Rank	Site	TV	Result	Attendance
September 2	6:30 p.m.	Syracuse*		Groves Stadium; Winston-Salem, NC	ESPN360	W 20–10	34,121
September 9	12:00 p.m.	Duke		Groves Stadium; Winston-Salem, NC (rivalry)	LFS	W 14–13	26,071
September 16	12:00 p.m.	at Connecticut*		Rentschler Field; East Hartford, CT	ESPN360	W 24–13	40,000
September 23	6:00 p.m.	at Ole Miss*		Vaught–Hemingway Stadium; Oxford, MS	CSS	W 27–3	52,079
September 30	3:30 p.m.	Liberty*		Groves Stadium; Winston-Salem, NC	ESPN360	W 34–14	29,623
October 7	12:00 p.m.	No. 15 Clemson		Groves Stadium; Winston-Salem, NC	ESPN	L 17–27	35,920
October 14	12:00 p.m.	at NC State		Carter–Finley Stadium; Raleigh, NC (rivalry)	LFS	W 25–23	55,972
October 28	3:30 p.m.	at North Carolina	No. 24	Kenan Memorial Stadium; Chapel Hill, NC (rivalry)	ESPNU	W 24–17	49,000
November 4	7:00 p.m.	No. 16 Boston College	No. 22	Groves Stadium; Winston-Salem, NC	ESPN2	W 21–14	32,633
November 11	8:00 p.m.	at Florida State	No. 18	Doak Campbell Stadium; Tallahassee, FL	ABC	W 30–0	77,785
November 18	7:00 p.m.	No. 19 Virginia Tech	No. 14	Groves Stadium; Winston-Salem, NC	ESPN2	L 6–27	36,723
November 25	7:45 p.m.	at Maryland	No. 20	Byrd Stadium; College Park, MD	ESPN	W 38–24	51,500
December 2	1:00 p.m.	vs. No. 23 Georgia Tech	No. 16	Alltel Stadium; Jacksonville, FL (ACC Championship Game)	ABC	W 9–6	62,850
January 2	8:00 p.m.	vs. No. 5 Louisville*	No. 15	Dolphin Stadium; Miami Gardens, FL (Orange Bowl)	FOX	L 13–24	74,470
*Non-conference game; Rankings from AP Poll released prior to the game; All times are in Eastern time

== Rankings ==
Ranking movements Legend: ██ Increase in ranking ██ Decrease in ranking — = Not ranked RV = Received votes
	Week															
Poll	Pre	1	2	3	4	5	6	7	8	9	10	11	12	13	14	Final
AP	—	—	—	—	RV	RV	RV	25	24	22	18	14	20	16	15	18
Coaches	—	—	—	—	RV	RV	RV	RV	RV	23	19	14	20	16	15	17
Harris	Not released				—	—	—	—	25	23	18	14	20	16	14	Not released
BCS	Not released							—	—	24	19	16	21	17	14	Not released

== Preseason ==
After finishing 4–7 in 2005 and in a tie for fourth place in the Atlantic Division of the ACC, the Deacons were picked in the pre-season to finish last in the division by the ACC media, among others, making the Deacons' run at the ACC title largely unexpected.

=== Coaching change ===
After Deacons' wide receivers coach Kevin Sherman left to take an assistant coaching position at Virginia Tech, Tim Billings was hired as his replacement. Billings was touted as having 23-years of experience at the college football level, including a six-year stint as head coach of Southeast Missouri State.

=== Roster changes ===
Although the Deacons returned an ACC high 18 starters from the 2005 team, they lost four key starters to graduation. On defense, the only starter to leave was nose tackle, Goryal Scales. On offense, three starters graduated, including wide receiver Chris Davis, quarterback Cory Randolph, and running back and ACC Player of the Year award-winner Chris Barclay. Finally, Ray Guy Award-winning punter Ryan Plackemeier also graduated.

=== Recruiting ===
During recruiting, the Deacons signed 15 new players for the team, including a number of three-star recruits and Josh Adams, a top-10 ranked running back. The team added eight players on offense, six on defense and a kicker, however before the season began, tight end recruit, Dennis Godfrey, decided not to enroll to the school.

College recruiting (2006)
Name	Hometown	School	Height	Weight	40^{‡}	Commit date
Josh Adams; RB	Cary, North Carolina	Cary HS	6 ft 0 in (1.83 m)	172 lb (78 kg)	4.54	Jan 25, 2006
Josh Adams; RB	Recruit ratings: Scout: Rivals: (80)					
Dan Caldwell; K	Oxford, Alabama	Oxford HS	6 ft 2 in (1.88 m)	235 lb (107 kg)	NA	Dec 27, 2005
Dan Caldwell; K	Recruit ratings: Scout: Rivals: (40)					
Lucas Caparelli; RB	Burke, Virginia	Robinson Secondary	5 ft 11 in (1.80 m)	185 lb (84 kg)	4.4	Jan 7, 2006
Lucas Caparelli; RB	Recruit ratings: Scout: Rivals: (71)					
Michael Carter; DT	Memphis, Tennessee	Melrose HS	6 ft 3 in (1.91 m)	282 lb (128 kg)	4.9	Dec 14, 2005
Michael Carter; DT	Recruit ratings: Scout: Rivals: (40)					
Alex Frye; DB	Fayetteville, North Carolina	Jack Britt	6 ft 3 in (1.91 m)	195 lb (88 kg)	4.55	Jan 7, 2006
Alex Frye; DB	Recruit ratings: Scout: Rivals: (40)					
Cannon Gaskin; OL	Jacksonville, Florida	Bolles School	6 ft 4 in (1.93 m)	260 lb (120 kg)	NA	Dec 5, 2005
Cannon Gaskin; OL	Recruit ratings: Scout: Rivals: (72)					
Dennis Godfrey; TE	Sanford, North Carolina	Lee County Senior HS	6 ft 2 in (1.88 m)	255 lb (116 kg)	5.0	Jun 20, 2005
Dennis Godfrey; TE	Recruit ratings: Scout: Rivals: (40)					
Hunter Haynes; LB	Jacksonville, Florida	Nease HS	6 ft 2 in (1.88 m)	218 lb (99 kg)	4.65	Nov 3, 2005
Hunter Haynes; LB	Recruit ratings: Scout: Rivals: (78)					
Zach MacDowall; QB	Kennesaw, Georgia	Harrison HS	6 ft 1 in (1.85 m)	197 lb (89 kg)	4.8	Jul 20, 2005
Zach MacDowall; QB	Recruit ratings: Scout: Rivals: (70)					
Russell Nenon; OL	Memphis, Tennessee	Memphis University School	6 ft 4 in (1.93 m)	280 lb (130 kg)	5.1	Dec 14, 2005
Russell Nenon; OL	Recruit ratings: Scout: Rivals: (74)					
Tripp Russell; DE	Winston-Salem, North Carolina	Mount Tabor HS	6 ft 3 in (1.91 m)	230 lb (100 kg)	4.8	Aug 27, 2005
Tripp Russell; DE	Recruit ratings: Scout: Rivals: (NA)					
Teddy Tomlin; DT	Lake City, Florida	Columbia High School-South	6 ft 3 in (1.91 m)	275 lb (125 kg)	NA	Dec 4, 2005
Teddy Tomlin; DT	Recruit ratings: Scout: Rivals: (40)					
Marcus Williams; DB	McDonough, Georgia	Eagles Landing HS	5 ft 9 in (1.75 m)	172 lb (78 kg)	4.53	Dec 22, 2005
Marcus Williams; DB	Recruit ratings: Scout: Rivals: (40)					
Marshall Williams; WR	Durham, North Carolina	Riverside HS	6 ft 1 in (1.85 m)	164 lb (74 kg)	4.6	Jun 27, 2005
Marshall Williams; WR	Recruit ratings: Scout: Rivals: (69)					
Matthew Woodlief; LB	Catawba, North Carolina	Bandys HS	6 ft 0 in (1.83 m)	230 lb (100 kg)	4.4	Jul 18, 2005
Matthew Woodlief; LB	Recruit ratings: Scout: Rivals: (64)					
Overall recruit ranking: Scout: #65 Rivals: #75
‡ Refers to 40-yard dash; Note: In many cases, Scout, Rivals, 247Sports, On3, and ESPN may conflict in their listings of height, weight and 40 time.; In these cases, the average was taken. ESPN grades are on a 100-point scale.; Sources: "Wake Forest Commit List 2006". Rivals.; "Scout.com Football Recruiting: Wake Forest". Scout.; "2006 Player Commitments – Wake Forest". ESPN.; "Scout.com Team Recruiting Rankings". Scout.; "2006 Team Ranking". Rivals.com.

=== Award candidates ===
Five Demon Deacon players were named to pre-season national award watchlists:

- Jon Abbate – Heisman Trophy
- Micah Andrews – Doak Walker Award
- Josh Gattis – Jim Thorpe Award
- Sam Swank – Lou Groza Award
- Steve Vallos – Outland Trophy

Along with the award candidates, six players were named as pre-season All-Americans on three lists. Andrews and Vallos on the first team and Abbate and Gattis on the second team were named so by the Sporting News, Abbate and Vallos were named on the first team by the Blue Ribbon College Football Yearbook, and finally, Vallos on the third team and Abbate, Gattis, Matt Robinson, and Swank as honorable mentions by Street & Smith.

== Game summaries ==
=== Syracuse ===
	1	2	3	4	Total
Orange	7	3	0	0	10
Demon Deacons	7	3	3	7	20

In the first game of the season, the Deacons took on the Syracuse Orange. For the first half, every time the Deacons scored, like quarterback Ben Mauk's 14-yard pass to Willie Idlette, the Orange answered. The half ended with the teams tied 10–10. In the second half, despite throwing an interception early in the quarter, Mauk led the Deacons to an eventual field goal to give them a 13–10 lead in the third quarter. However, before the field goal, Mauk suffered an injury to his right arm when two Syracuse players fell on the arm as he was attempting to recover a fumble. He was replaced by Riley Skinner who only threw one pass. In the fourth quarter, on the final scoring drive, the Deacons took nearly eight minutes off the clock with their running game, and scored on a 19-yard run by De'Angelo Bryant. The Deacons won the game 20–10, but had to make a decision on their quarterback.

=== Duke ===
	1	2	3	4	Total
Blue Devils	3	7	3	0	13
Demon Deacons	0	0	7	7	14

With Riley Skinner given the go-ahead to take over as the starting quarterback, the Deacons had to take on visiting Duke, a team who had only won one game in 2005. Duke, however, took an early lead with a 27-yard field goal and a 47-yard touchdown pass to take a 10–0 lead at halftime. Finally answering, Skinner threw the first touchdown pass of his career, a 5-yard pass to John Tereshinski, to bring them within three. The Blue Devils kicked another field goal, this one of 39-yards to take a 13–7 lead into the fourth quarter. Late in the fourth, the Deacons took their first lead of the game on a 2-yard touchdown run by Micah Andrews. With a minute remaining, the Blue Devils started a drive that brought them to the Deacons 11-yard line. With six seconds remaining, they attempted a game-winning field goal, however, Chip Vaughn was able to block the attempt to give the Deacons a 14–13 win.

=== @ Connecticut ===
	1	2	3	4	Total
Demon Deacons	14	0	0	10	24
Huskies	7	6	0	0	13

On their first road game of the season, the Deacons went to face the Connecticut Huskies. They took an early lead on an interception of D.J. Hernandez by Jeremy Thompson, who returned the ball 86-yards for the touchdown. Hernandez was able to bring the Huskies back and tied the game later in the quarter on a 6-yard pass, but Micah Andrews' 6-yard run for a touchdown gave the Deacons a lead they would never relinquish. In the second quarter, Lou Allen's 15-yard touchdown brought the Huskies within one after a missed extra point, to have the half end with the Deacons ahead 14–13. With no score in the third quarter, the Deacons padded their lead in the fourth with a 43-yard field goal by Sam Swank and another 6-yard touchdown run, this time by Richard Belton, to give the final score of the game as 24–13. With the win, the Deacons were 3–0 for the first time in 19 years.

=== @ Ole Miss ===
	1	2	3	4	Total
Demon Deacons	7	3	17	0	27
Rebels	0	3	0	0	3

The Deacons visited Ole Miss for their fourth game, and once again relied on their running and kicking games to win a game. Despite not having Micah Andrews, De'Angelo Bryant took over for him and gave the Deacons an early lead on a 9-yard touchdown. With a 38-yard field goal by Swank, and the Rebels' only answer of a 26-yard field goal, the Deacons took a 10–3 lead into the half. In the third quarter the Deacons added two more rushing touchdowns and another field goal to pad their lead. With no score in the fourth, the Deacons won the game 27–3.

=== Liberty ===
	1	2	3	4	Total
Flames	0	7	0	7	14
Demon Deacons	10	17	0	7	34

The Deacons next took on the Division I FCS Liberty Flames. This time winning without only relying on their running game. Skinner threw for 218 yards including a 59-yard touchdown that gave the Deacons a 27–7 lead at halftime. Although the Flames were able to score twice, the Deacons easily outscored and outplayed them, winning 34–14.

=== Clemson ===
	1	2	3	4	Total
#12 Tigers	3	0	0	24	27
Demon Deacons	7	7	3	0	17

The No. 12 ranked Clemson Tigers next came to visit the Deacons. Although the Tigers took an early lead with a field goal, a pair of touchdown passes, one by Skinner and the other on a trick play Nate Morton to Skinner, gave the Deacons a 14–3 lead at the half. In the third quarter, a 22-yard field goal by Swank gave the Deacons a 17–3 lead that wouldn't hold. On the first play of the fourth quarter a fumble on the Deacons' 35-yard line was returned by Gaines Adams for a touchdown. Three minutes later the Tigers tied the game on a 20-yard pass and then took a lead with a 72-yard touchdown run. With a final field goal, the Tigers ended the game, winning 27–17 and breaking the Deacons' winning streak.

=== @ NC State ===
	1	2	3	4	Total
Demon Deacons	7	15	0	3	25
Wolfpack	0	14	0	9	23

The Deacons next visited the NC State Wolfpack. Taking an early lead with a touchdown run and a 51-yard field goal, the Wolfpack came back and scored two touchdowns to give them a 14–10 lead. However, after Swank kicked a 53-yard field goal, the Deacon defense forced a safety with a minute left in the half. Skinner was able to capitalize with a 57-yard touchdown pass to Nate Morton to take a 22–14 lead into the half. In the fourth quarter, with the Wolfpack down five after a field goal, Swank kicked another 53-yard field goal to give the Deacons an eight-point advantage. With a touchdown with five minutes remaining, the Wolfpack brought the score within two points, however failed on the two-point conversion attempt. After holding the Deacons, the Wolfpack moved to the 40-yard line before a pass intercepted by Josh Gattis ended the game. The Deacons won the game 25–23 and were 6–1 for the first time since 1979. After the game the team was ranked

=== @ North Carolina ===
	1	2	3	4	Total
#24 Demon Deacons	7	7	0	10	24
Tar Heels	7	7	3	0	17

The Deacons next visited the North Carolina Tar Heels. After a blocked punt was returned for a touchdown by the Deacons, the Tar Heels were able to tie the game with a 1-yard touchdown pass. In the second quarter, after another touchdown by the Deacons, the Tar Heels once again answered and the teams were tied 14–14 at the half. In the third quarter the Tar Heels took their first lead with a 35-yard field goal. The Deacons wouldn't answer until early in the fourth quarter on a Swank field goal. They took their final lead on a Skinner pass of 39-yards. Down by a touchdown, the Tar Heels drove to scoring range, however, an errant pass on the final play of the game was intercepted by Jon Abbate to seal the win for the Deacons, 24–17. With the win the team was 7–1 for only the third time in school history.

=== Boston College ===
	1	2	3	4	Total
#16 Eagles	0	7	7	0	14
#23 Demon Deacons	7	7	7	0	21

The No. 16 ranked Boston College Eagles next faced the Deacons. The Deacons took the lead midway through the first quarter on a 9-yard reverse by Willie Idlette. After a drive that ended on the first play of the second quarter gave the Eagles a 1-yard touchdown run, the Deacons answered later in the quarter with a 46-yard touchdown pass by Skinner. On the Eagles' next drive, quarterback Matt Ryan threw an interception in the endzone that ended their scoring chance. The half ended with the Deacons winning 14–7. On the Deacons first play of the second half, after holding the Eagles on a fourth down attempt, Kevin Marion ran for an 81-yard touchdown. Ryan answered later on a 2-yard scramble to put the Eagles down 21–14 at the end of the third quarter. In the fourth, the Eagles, after missing a 40-yard field goal, forced an interception from Skinner. On their drive, however, after an 11-yard run, L.V. Whitworth fumbled the ball to end the drive. On their last chance in the game, after converting a fourth down, Ryan threw a second interception in the endzone to Patrick Ghee, to seal the win for the Deacons, 21–14. The Deacons beat a ranked team for the first time in nine chances, were 8–1 for the first time since 1944, and tied a school record for wins in a season.

=== @ Florida State ===
	1	2	3	4	Total
#19 Demon Deacons	3	17	10	0	30
Seminoles	0	0	0	0	0

The Deacons next went to Tallahassee to face the Florida State Seminoles, a team the Deacons hadn't beaten in Tallahassee since 1959 and who they had lost to 14 straight games. The Deacons dominated the game, however, and had a 20–0 lead at halftime. With both Seminole quarterbacks throwing two interceptions each, one of which was returned for a 48-yard touchdown, the Deacons held the Seminoles scoreless for the first time at home since Bobby Bowden started as their coach. With a final score of 30–0, the Deacons won a school record ninth game in the season.

=== Virginia Tech ===
	1	2	3	4	Total
#19 Hokies	7	0	17	3	27
#14 Demon Deacons	0	3	3	0	6

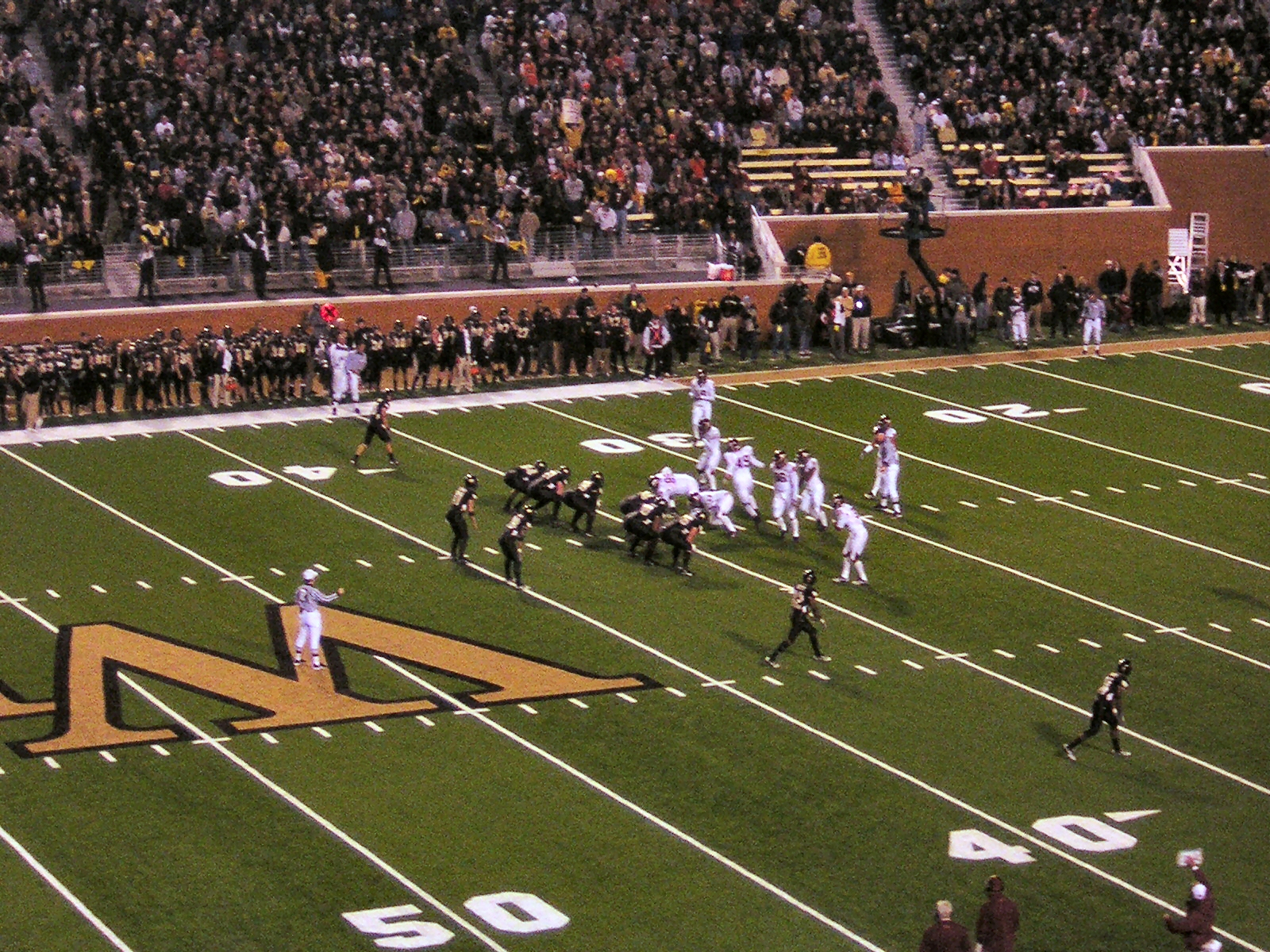

The No. 19 Virginia Tech Hokies next visited the Deacons. The Hokies took an early lead on a 49-yard touchdown pass in the first quarter. After losing ACC-leading rusher Branden Ore in the first quarter, the Hokies didn't score again until after the half. The Deacons, however, couldn't take advantage, and only scored a field goal to trail 7–3 at halftime. Early in the third quarter, the Hokies scored again on a long pass of 53-yards. The Deacons answered with another field goal, but the Hokies kept an 11-point lead after their own field goal. After a fumble was returned by the Hokies for 35-yards, the Deacons never answered again. The Hokies padded their lead with a fourth-quarter field goal, to give them the win, 27–6.

=== @ Maryland ===
	1	2	3	4	Total
#20 Demon Deacons	7	14	10	7	38
Terrapins	7	7	3	7	24

The Deacons visited the Maryland Terrapins for their final game of the regular season and with a chance to win the ACC Atlantic Division. The Terrapins took a touchdown lead midway through the first quarter, however a Kevin Harris 2-yard touchdown run answered for the Deacons. The Deacons then scored two touchdowns, including a 49-yard pass from Skinner to Willie Idlette to take the lead. The Terrapins scored late in the half to bring the halftime score to 21–14 in favor of the Deacons. In the third quarter both teams traded field goals, but another Harris touchdown run gave the Deacons another two touchdown lead. In the fourth, both teams scored short touchdowns, but the early lead was enough for the Deacons who won 38–24. With the win, the Deacons won the Atlantic Division of the ACC and advanced to the ACC Championship game against the Coastal Division champion Georgia Tech Yellow Jackets.

=== Vs. Georgia Tech–ACC Championship Game ===
	1	2	3	4	Total
#16 Demon Deacons	0	3	0	6	9
#22 Yellow Jackets	3	0	0	3	6

The Deacons next went to Jacksonville to face the No. 22 Georgia Tech Yellow Jackets in the second annual ACC Championship game. Both teams' defenses dominated the game, as each held the opposing offenses to under 300 yards for the game. The Deacons defense intercepted two Reggie Ball passes to help their effort. In the first half, both teams kicked field goals to go to halftime tied at 3. Early in the fourth quarter the Yellow Jackets took another lead with a second field goal to take a 6–3 lead. However, the Deacons came back and kicked two more field goals, the second with three minutes remaining in the game, to win the game 9–6. The winning score was the lowest for a conference champion ever. With the win, the Deacons won their second ACC Championship and won the ACC's spot in the BCS.

=== Vs. Louisville–Orange Bowl ===
	1	2	3	4	Total
#6 Cardinals	0	10	0	14	24
#15 Demon Deacons	0	3	7	3	13

In the Deacons' first BCS bowl game they went to the Orange Bowl to play the No. 6 Louisville Cardinals, winners of the Big East. The Deacons took an early lead with a field goal, however the Cardinals answered with their own field goal and a touchdown in the first quarter to take a 10–3 lead to halftime. In the third quarter, Skinner tied the game on a 30-yard touchdown pass and took a three-point lead in the fourth after a 36-yard field goal. The lead didn't last too long, as the Cardinals scored a quick touchdown and another one later in the quarter. With the scores the Cardinals took a 24–13 win. Even with the loss, the Deacons finished their best season in school history.

== Coaching staff ==
Position	Name	First year at WFU
Head coach	Jim Grobe	2001
Wide Receivers	Tim Billings	2006
Fullbacks / Tight ends	Tom Elrod	2003
Defensive ends	Keith Henry	2001
Defensive coordinator / Secondary	Dean Hood	2001
Linebackers	Brad Lambert	2001
Offensive coordinator / Offensive line	Steed Lobotzke	2001
Defensive tackles	Ray McCartney	2001
Assistant head coach / Running backs / Kickers	Billy Mitchell	2001
Quarterbacks	Jeff Mullen	2001

=== Roster ===
Wide receiver

- 14 Kevin Marion – (redshirt) junior
- 15 Delon Lowe – (redshirt) junior
- 21 Kenneth Moore – (redshirt) junior
- 24 Trey Schmidt – junior
- 39 Matt Hartford – freshman
- 36 Casey Hill – (redshirt) freshman
- 37 Max Opamuratawongse – junior
- 80 Jonathan Jones – (redshirt) freshman
- 81 Will Hollis – (redshirt) senior
- 82 Willie Idlette – (redshirt) senior
- 83 Nate Morton – (redshirt) senior
- 86 Marshall Williams – freshman
- 88 Chip Brinkman – sophomore

Center

- 57 Russell Nenon – freshman
- 67 Trey Bailey – (redshirt) freshman
- 74 Steve Justice – (redshirt) junior

Offensive guard

- 60 Barrett McMillin – (redshirt) freshman
- 65 Gage Crews – (redshirt) freshman
- 70 Chris DeGeare – sophomore
- 71 Eric Gaskins – (redshirt) sophomore
- 73 Cannon Gaskin – freshman
- 77 Boomer Peterson – (redshirt) freshman
- 79 Matthew Brim – (redshirt) junior

Offensive tackle

- 61 Arby Jones – (redshirt) senior
- 64 Jeff Griffin – (redshirt) freshman
- 75 Steve Vallos – (redshirt) senior
- 76 Joe Birdsong – (redshirt) freshman
- 78 Louis Frazier – (redshirt) junior

Tight end

- 84 Zac Selmon – (redshirt) junior
- 87 Ted Randolph – (redshirt) freshman
- 89 John Tereshinski – (redshirt) junior
- 85 Ben Wooster – (redshirt) freshman
- 97 Daniel Callahan – (redshirt) senior

Quarterback

- 6 Brett Hodges – (redshirt) freshman
- 8 Ben Mauk – (redshirt) junior
- 10 Zach MacDowall – freshman
- 11 Riley Skinner – (redshirt) freshman
- 13 Ryan McManus – sophomore

Tailback

- 3 Micah Andrews – (redshirt) junior
- 12 Marcus Williams – freshman
- 18 De'Angelo Bryant – (redshirt) junior
- 20 Lucas Caparelli – freshman
- 23 Kevin Harris – (redshirt) freshman
- 25 Alonzo Chisolm – senior
- 26 Travo Woods – (redshirt) junior
- 27 Josh Adams – freshman

Fullback

- 35 Rich Belton – (redshirt) sophomore
- 44 Mike Rinfrette – (redshirt) freshman
- 49 Damon McWhite – (redshirt) senior

Defensive end

- 42 Matt Robinson – (redshirt) junior
- 48 Bryan Andrews – (redshirt) senior
- 51 John Russell – (redshirt) freshman
- 54 Antonio Wilso – (redshirt) sophomore
- 93 Anthony Davis – (redshirt) sophomore
- 94 Tripp Russell – freshman
- 98 Jeremy Thompson – junior

Defensive tackle

- 50 Teddy Tomlin – freshman
- 55 Jyles Tucker – senior
- 58 Michael Carter – freshman
- 90 Jamil Smith – (redshirt) senior
- 95 Zach Stukes – (redshirt) junior
- 96 Boo Robinson – (redshirt) freshman
- 99 Michael Lockett – (redshirt) freshman

Cornerback

- 2 Alphonso Smith – (redshirt) sophomore
- 7 Riley Swanson – (redshirt) senior
- 10 Kevin Patterson – (redshirt) sophomore
- 24 Channing Schofield – (redshirt) freshman
- 29 Kerry Major – (redshirt) sophomore

Linebacker

- 5 Jon Abbate – (redshirt) junior
- 34 Pierre Easley – (redshirt) senior
- 41 Eric Berry – (redshirt) sophomore
- 43 Stanley Arnoux – (redshirt) sophomore
- 45 Mike Simmons – junior
- 46 Matt Woodlief – freshman
- 52 Dominique Midgett – (redshirt) freshman
- 56 Hunter Haynes – freshman
- 59 Aaron Curry – (redshirt) sophomore
- 63 Andrew Conroy – sophomore

Safety

- 4 Quijano Ewing – (redshirt) freshman
- 9 Chip Vaughn – (redshirt) sophomore
- 13 Johnny Edwards – (redshirt) junior
- 22 Josh Gattis – (redshirt) senior
- 30 Patrick Ghee – (redshirt) senior
- 32 Aaron Mason – (redshirt) junior
- 36 Jess Powell – junior
- 37 Alex Frye – freshman
- 39 Chantz McClinic – (redshirt) sophomore

Long snapper

- 92 Nick Jarvis – junior

Punter

- 40 Dan Caldwell – freshman

Placekicker

- 20 Jon Temple – senior
- 38 Sam Swank – (redshirt) sophomore

== Awards and honors ==
=== Conference ===
Grobe was unanimously named the ACC Coach of the Year by the media. Along with Grobe's honor, Riley Skinner was singled out by the media and was named the ACC Rookie of the Year. Along with the individual awards, nine players, five on the first team, one on the second, and three honorable mention, a Wake Forest record, were named to the All-ACC team.

=== National ===
Two players and once again Jim Grobe were honored as finalists for national awards. Zac Selmon was named as a Wuerffel Trophy finalist, Sam Swank was named as a semifinalist for both the Lou Groza Award and the Ray Guy Award, and Grobe was a finalist for the Eddie Robinson Coach of the Year. Although none won, Grobe was named coach of the year by five other organizations, including the AP award and the Bobby Dodd Coach of the Year Award.

Along with the award winners, six players were named by four sources to their All-America teams. Sam Swank was named to the first teams of Rivals.com, ESPN, and Sports Illustrated. Also named by Sports Illustrated were Steve Vallos also on the first team and Jon Abbate and Josh Gattis as honorable mentions. Vallos was also named by the Sporting News to their team. Finally, Jeff Griffin on the second team and Riley Skinner on the third team, were named by the Sporting News to their Freshman All-American team.

== After the season ==
Ten former starters left due to graduation or being drafted in the 2007 NFL draft. Mauk, who had to undergo extensive reconstructive surgery on his injured throwing arm, graduated and then left to pursue a master's degree. He took advantage of an NCAA rule (later repealed and still later restored) allowing graduate students with remaining athletic eligibility to transfer and gain immediate eligibility at their new school, and finished his college career as the starting quarterback at the University of Cincinnati. Nine other players went on to the NFL, including Josh Gattis who was selected in the fifth round of the draft by Jacksonville and Steve Vallos who was selected in the seventh round by Seattle. After the season, former recruit Dennis Godfrey enrolled with the new class.
