= Earl Heyman =

American gridiron football player (born 1987)

No. 66
- Position: Defensive tackle

Personal information
- Born: September 5, 1987 (age 39); Louisville, Kentucky, U.S.
- Listed height: 6 ft 1 in (1.85 m)
- Listed weight: 310 lb (141 kg)

Career information
- College: Louisville
- NFL draft: 2009: undrafted

Career history
- New Orleans Saints (2009); Edmonton Eskimos (2010)*; Cleveland Gladiators (2011)
- * Offseason or practice squad member only

Awards and highlights
- Super Bowl champion (XLIV)

Career AFL statistics
- Total tackles: 6
- Sacks: 2
- Forced fumbles: 1
- Stats at ArenaFan.com

Earl Heyman (born September 5, 1987) is an American former football defensive tackle, winning a Super Bowl with the New Orleans Saints.

== College career ==
Heyman played college football at Louisville, finishing his career with 112 tackles, 8.5 sacks, one Interception, 7 pass deflections and 2 Forced fumbles.

== Professional career ==
=== New Orleans Saints ===
On May 11, 2009, Heyman signed with the New Orleans Saints as an undrafted free agent. On September 5, 2009, he was released, and was signed to the practice squad. On February 19, 2010, he again was signed to a roster contract, and released on July 29 of that year.

=== Edmonton Eskimos ===
On August 23, 2010, Heyman signed with the Edmonton Eskimos of the Canadian Football League to join the practice roster. On September 2, 2010, he was released from the practice roster.

=== Cleveland Gladiators ===
On April 25, 2011, Heyman signed with the Cleveland Gladiators of the Arena Football League.

== Boxing career ==
Heyman defeated Chris Bascler to become the 2012 Heavyweight Golden Gloves Boxing Champion in the state of Indiana. He also won the 2012 Ringside world championships in the heavyweight division. He is currently 24–0, with 22 KO's.
