= Northern High School (Durham, North Carolina) =

American public school in North Carolina

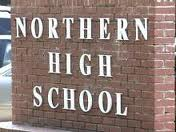
- Northern High School, Spring 1995

Location
- 4622 North Roxboro Road; Durham, North Carolina 27712; United States; 36°03′43″N 78°53′56″W

Information
- Type: Public
- Established: 1955 (71 years ago)
- School district: Durham Public Schools
- CEEB code: 341080
- Principal: Matthew Hunt
- Teaching staff: 80.96 (FTE)
- Enrollment: 1,334 (2023–2024)
- Student to teacher ratio: 16.48
- Colors: Blue and gold
- Mascot: Knight
- Nickname: Northern Knights, NHS, Blue Knights, Northern Durham
- Website: www.dpsnc.net/o/northern

Northern High School (also known as Northern Durham) is a public secondary school located in northern Durham, North Carolina. Northern's principal Danny Gilfort was succeeded by Emmet Alexander as of January 2024. On August 1, 2026 Durham Public Schools announced that Matthew Hunt would return to Northern High School and succeed Emmet Alexander as principal..

Mr. Hunt started working at Northern in 2005. In 11 years he progressed from mathematics teacher to principal until he was succeeded by Danny Gilfort after accepting the principal position at Merrick-Moore Elementary School.

1536 students were enrolled at Northern for the 2017–2018 school year. Northern is one of Durham's seven public high schools. Students take four classes each day as a block schedule is currently in place. Northern's mascot for their male teams is the Knights and for the female teams, it is the Ladies.

Northern High School offers Advanced Placement classes in English, American History, European History, Psychology, Statistics, Calculus AB and BC, Environmental Science, Biology, Chemistry, Physics, Computer Science, Spanish, French, Latin, German, Studio Art, Music Theory (Independent Study), and US Government & Politics.

Northern High School employs over 150 staff members including three assistant principals. 36.8% of Northern students earned a 17 or above on the ACT during the 2016–2017 school year.

In 2007, Northern High School was ranked as the 928th best high school in America by Newsweek. The school continues to rank in the top five percent of public high schools nationwide. Northern High School is currently recognized as a School of Progress, with over 60 percent of students at or above achievement standards.

== History ==
The citizens of Durham County approved a bond issue in 1952 to build a new high school in northern Durham County, consolidating Mangum High School and Braggtown High School. The land for the school was formerly an airfield and apple orchard. Northern High School was designed by George Watts Carr, the same architect that designed the Hill Building.

On September 1, 1955 Northern High School opened with an enrollment of 502 students in grades 9–12. The students came from the feeder schools of Glenn, Hillandale, Mangum and Braggtown schools. The then new Northern High School had only 17 classrooms, a home economics department, a shop, a library, and a gymnasium.

In 1958 the following additions opened to students: auditorium, bandroom, and additional classrooms called "North Hall", N1-N10. This was followed in 1963 with the addition to "North Hall" classrooms, N11-N22. In 1966 a cafeteria addition was completed and the high school had an enrollment of 852. At that time, the high school consisted of the "North Hall", "East Hall" and "West Hall".

For the most part, integration occurred smoothly and with only one recorded incident of racial tension at Northern High School, which the Durham County School Board helped to mediate.

In the 1980s, a new classroom stand-alone wing was added, called "Katherine Webb Hall" (Harrison Hall). By the mid-1980s Northern High School was one of North Carolina's largest high schools with 2,300–2,500 students and was, at this time, the largest high school in Durham County and Durham City. The school at this time only had grades 10, 11 and 12. Grade 9 was at this time located in the junior high schools along with grades 7 and 8. Durham County School System had not yet converted to the middle school format, containing grades 6, 7 and 8, as the Durham City School System had converted to a few years before. Northern High School's feeder junior high schools were Carrington Junior High School and Chewning Junior High School.

In 1984 a new Vocational Wing was completed and in 1988 the First Phase of New Science Wing and Tennis Courts were completed. In 1993 the old Vocational Wing was renovated and new additions completed. In 1994 a new Arts Department Wing was completed and "North Hall" and "West Hall" were renovated along with a second phase of the New Science Wing was completed. There was also an addition to the Library and renovations on the existing space. In 1995 major additions were made to the cafeteria and the commons area and entire high school building complex was air-conditioned.

Until the early 1990s, Durham County had two public school systems: the Durham City Schools System and the Durham County Schools System. A new high school was built close to Northern in 1991, which was named Riverside High School. This establishment decreased Northern High School's enrollment to its current number of 1,400 plus. The school was built due to northern Durham County's growing population and the lack of space at Northern High School.

The demographics of Northern High School have changed over the years with those of Durham County.

In 2020, construction began on a new $96 million Northern Durham High School 3 miles south of the Tom Wilkinson Rd campus, a new use will be found for the original building. The new building opened to students in September 2023 and includes all new on campus athletic and academic facilities.

== Athletics ==
Northern High School has been known for both academic and athletic excellence throughout the past 50 years. Notably, the Northern football program won the 1993 North Carolina 4-A state championship under the leadership of current UNC assistant coach, Ken Browning. Other highly recognized teams include Ladies basketball, Ladies softball, and Knights wrestling.

Northern High School played its football games at Durham County Stadium through the 2023 season. The stadium was once also the home football field to what was then called Durham High School (now the Durham School of the Arts) and Hillside High School. Games have since moved to the new on campus stadium upon completion (October 2023).

Northern High School's biggest rival is currently Riverside High School. Other local rivalries include Southern High School (Durham) and Person High School.

In February 2008, after winning the PAC-6 Tournament and gaining the number 2 seed in the playoffs, the Northern High School Varsity Men's Basketball team had to forfeit all games of their 15–11 season due to an "attendance issue" that made a player ineligible. Reasons for the decision were not made public by the school or the district, and the player's name was not released to the general public.

In February 2014, after winning the PAC-6 Tournament for the first time since 1994 the Varsity Men's Basketball posted a 26–3 record while making it to the third round of the NCHSAA state playoffs as a #2 seed under head coach Ronnie Russell and Conference player of the year Ricky Council II.

== Notable alumni ==
- Kentrell Barkley, professional basketball player
- Chase Bullock, American football linebacker
- A. J. Davis, NFL cornerback
- Josh Gattis, NFL player and current college football coach
- Kamille, professional wrestler
- Carl Reeves, NFL defensive end
- Scott Riggs, NASCAR driver
- David Rouzer, U.S. Representative from North Carolina
- Monty Taylor, Cloud Computing executive
- Chuck Vincent, professional basketball player
- Dewayne Washington, NFL cornerback
- Steve Wilson, NFL defensive back and current coach
