= Nate Harris =

American football player (born 1983)

No. 98
- Position: Linebacker

Personal information
- Born: March 8, 1983 (age 43); Miami, Florida, U.S.
- Listed height: 6 ft 0 in (1.83 m)
- Listed weight: 230 lb (104 kg)

Career information
- College: Louisville
- NFL draft: 2007: undrafted

Career history
- Kansas City Chiefs (2007); New York Jets (2009)*
- * Offseason or practice squad member only

Career NFL statistics
- Total tackles: 14
- Stats at Pro Football Reference

Nathaniel Antwon Harris (born March 8, 1983) is an American former professional football player who was a linebacker in the National Football League (NFL). He played college football for the Louisville Cardinals and was signed by the Kansas City Chiefs as an undrafted free agent in 2007.

Harris was waived by Kansas City at the end of the 2007 and did not play in the 2008 season.

Harris was also a member of the New York Jets in 2009, and was later waived.

In 2014, Harris was charged with a string of armed robberies of Louisville hotels and a dry cleaner.
