= Charles Humbert Marie Vincent =

French general of the Revolution and the Empire

Charles Humbert Marie Vincent (21 March 1753 – 27 July 1831) was a French general of the Revolution and the Empire.

== Life ==
Vincent entered the French military service on 1 January 1773, as a lieutenant in the School of Engineering Mezieres. In 1779, he conducted a mission along Jura Mountains which lie on the French border with Switzerland. He received his captain's certificate on 23 March 1786. He was sent to Saint-Domingue on 14 April 1786 and returned to France in 1791. He was made a Knight of St. Louis on 1 January 1791.

In May 1792, he returned to Saint-Domingue, but after the riots of June 1793 in Cape Town, he was forced to flee to the United States. Repatriated in August 1795, he was appointed head of the battalion on 21 March 1795, during his stay in America. On 23 February 1796, he was elevated to the rank of brigade leader, and on 23 March, he was sent back to Santo Domingo, as director general of the fortifications of the Leeward Islands. Back in France in December 1797, he returned to Saint-Domingue on 29 September 1798. Back in Lorient on 2 November 1799, he was assigned to the Ministry of War.

In 1801, he was the bearer of the constitution established by Toussaint Louverture, and he advised the First Consul against making the Saint-Domingue expedition, but his advice was not heeded. On 29 January 1803, he was placed in Amiens, as director of fortifications, then he moved to Bayonne, with the same function. He was made a Knight of the Legion of Honor on 11 December 1803 and an officer of the order on 14 June 1804.

In 1807, he was appointed to the position of chief engineer command of the army of Portugal, under the orders of General Jean-Andoche Junot. After the capture of Lisbon on 1 December 1807 and the conquest of Portugal, he was responsible for providing for defending the conquered territories.

Vincent returned to Bayonne in 1809, where he was promoted to honorary brigadier general on 22 September 1814, and titular field marshal on 28 August 1815.

Vincent was admitted to retirement on 28 October 1815. He died on 27 July 1831 in Bayonne.
