= 2006 NCAA Division I FBS football rankings =

- Season: 2006
- Bowl season: 2006–07 bowl games
- Preseason No. 1: Ohio State
- End of season champions: Florida
- Conference with most teams in final AP poll: SEC (6)

Three human polls and one formulaic ranking make up the 2006 NCAA Division I FBS (Football Bowl Subdivision) football rankings, in addition to various publications' preseason polls. Unlike most sports, college football's governing body, the NCAA, does not bestow a National Championship title. That title is bestowed by one or more of four different polling agencies. There are two main weekly polls that begin in the preseason: the AP Poll and the Coaches Poll. About halfway through the season, two additional polls are released, the Harris Interactive Poll and the Bowl Championship Series (BCS) standings. The Harris Poll and Coaches Poll are factors in the BCS standings. At the end of the season, the BCS standings determine who plays in the BCS bowl games as well as the BCS National Championship Game.

== Legend ==
	Increase in ranking
	Decrease in ranking
	Not ranked previous week
	Selected for BCS National Championship Game
(#–#)	Win–loss record
(Italics)	Number of first place votes
т	Tied with team above or below also with this symbol

== AP Poll ==
	Preseason	Week 1 Sept 5	Week 2 Sept 10	Week 3 Sept 17	Week 4 Sept 24	Week 5 Oct 1	Week 6 Oct 8	Week 7 Oct 15	Week 8 Oct 22	Week 9 Oct 29	Week 10 Nov 5	Week 11 Nov 12	Week 12 Nov 19	Week 13 Nov 26	Week 14 Dec 3	Week 15 (Final) Jan 9	
1.	Ohio State (35)	Ohio State (1–0) (39)	Ohio State (2–0) (59)	Ohio State (3–0) (59)	Ohio State (4–0) (59)	Ohio State (5–0) (62)	Ohio State (6–0) (63)	Ohio State (7–0) (63)	Ohio State (8–0) (63)	Ohio State (9–0) (63)	Ohio State (10–0) (65)	Ohio State (11–0) (64)	Ohio State (12–0) (65)	Ohio State (12–0) (65)	Ohio State (12–0) (65)	Florida (13–1) (64)	1.
2.	Notre Dame (10)	Texas (1–0) (7)	Notre Dame (2–0) (3)	Auburn (3–0) (2)	Auburn (4–0) (2)	Auburn (5–0) (1)	Florida (6–0)	Michigan (7–0)	Michigan (8–0)	Michigan (9–0)	Michigan (10–0)	Michigan (11–0) (1)	Michigan (11–1)	USC (10–1)	Florida (12–1)	Ohio State (12–1)	2.
3.	Texas (8)	USC (1–0) (3)	Auburn (2–0) (2)	USC (2–0) (2)	USC (3–0) (2)	USC (4–0)	USC (5–0)	USC (6–0)	USC (6–0)	West Virginia (7–0) (2)	Louisville (8–0)	Florida (9–1)	USC (9–1)	Michigan (11–1)	Michigan (11–1)	LSU (11–2)	3.
4.	Auburn (3)	Auburn (1–0) (3) т	USC (1–0) (2)	West Virginia (3–0) (2)	West Virginia (4–0) (2)	West Virginia (5–0) (2)	Michigan (6–0)	West Virginia (6–0) (2)	West Virginia (7–0) (2)	Texas (8–1)	Texas (9–1)	USC (8–1)	Florida (10–1)	Florida (11–1)	LSU (10–2)	USC (11–2)	4.
5.	West Virginia (6)	Notre Dame (1–0) (8) т	West Virginia (2–0) (2)	Florida (3–0)	Florida (4–0)	Florida (5–0)	West Virginia (5–0) (2)	Texas (6–1)	Texas (7–1)	Louisville (7–0)	Auburn (9–1)	Arkansas (9–1)	Arkansas (10–1)	LSU (10–2)	Louisville (11–1)	Boise State (13–0) (1)	5.
6.	USC (3)	West Virginia (1–0) (5)	LSU (2–0)	Michigan (3–0)	Michigan (4–0)	Michigan (5–0)	Texas (5–1)	Louisville (6–0)	Louisville (7–0)	Auburn (8–1)	Florida (8–1)	Notre Dame (9–1)	Notre Dame (10–1)	Louisville (10–1)	Wisconsin (11–1)	Louisville (12–1)	6.
7.	Florida	Florida (1–0)	Florida (2–0)	Texas (2–1)	Texas (3–1)	Texas (4–1)	Louisville (5–0)	Tennessee (5–1)	Auburn (7–1)	Florida (7–1)	USC (7–1)	Rutgers (9–0)	West Virginia (9–1)	Wisconsin (11–1)	Oklahoma (11–2)	Wisconsin (12–1)	7.
8.	LSU	LSU (1–0)	Texas (1–1)	Louisville (3–0)	Louisville (4–0)	Louisville (4–0)	Tennessee (5–1)	Auburn (6–1)	Tennessee (6–1)	Tennessee (7–1)	California (8–1)	West Virginia (8–1)	Louisville (9–1)	Arkansas (10–2) т	USC (10–2)	Michigan (11–2)	8.
9.	California	Florida State (1–0)	Florida State (2–0)	Georgia (3–0)	LSU (3–1)	LSU (4–1)	Notre Dame (5–1)	Florida (6–1)	Florida (6–1)	USC (6–1)	Notre Dame (8–1)	LSU (8–2)	LSU (9–2)	Oklahoma (10–2) т	Boise State (12–0)	Auburn (11–2)	9.
10.	Oklahoma	Michigan (1–0)	Georgia (2–0)	LSU (2–1)	Georgia (4–0)	Georgia (5–0)	California (5–1)	Notre Dame (5–1)	Clemson (7–1)	California (7–1)	West Virginia (7–1)	Louisville (8–1)	Wisconsin (11–1)	Boise State (12–0)	Auburn (10–2)	West Virginia (11–2)	10.
11.	Florida State	Tennessee (1–0)	Michigan (2–0)	Virginia Tech (3–0)	Virginia Tech (4–0)	Oregon (4–0)	Auburn (5–1)	California (6–1)	Notre Dame (6–1)	Notre Dame (7–1)	Arkansas (8–1)	Texas (9–2)	Texas (9–2)	Auburn (10–2)	Notre Dame (10–2)	Oklahoma (11–3)	11.
12.	Miami (FL)	Georgia (1–0)	Louisville (2–0)	Notre Dame (2–1)	Notre Dame (3–1)	Notre Dame (4–1)	Clemson (5–1)	Clemson (6–1)	California (7–1)	Arkansas (7–1)	LSU (7–2)	Wisconsin (10–1)	Boise State (11–0)	Notre Dame (10–2)	Arkansas (10–3)	Rutgers (11–2)	12.
13.	Louisville	Louisville (1–0)	Tennessee (2–0)	Oregon (3–0)	Iowa (4–0)	Tennessee (4–1)	Georgia Tech (5–1)	Georgia Tech (5–1)	Arkansas (6–1)	LSU (6–2)	Tennessee (7–2)	Boise State (10–0)	Oklahoma (9–2)	Rutgers (10–1)	West Virginia (10–2)	Texas (10–3)	13.
14.	Michigan	Iowa (1–0)	Virginia Tech (2–0)	Iowa (3–0)	Oregon (3–0)	Oklahoma (3–1)	LSU (4–2)	LSU (5–2)	LSU (6–2)	Boise State (8–0)	Boise State (9–0)	Wake Forest (9–1)	Auburn (10–2)	Virginia Tech (10–2)	Virginia Tech (10–2)	California (10–3)	14.
15.	Georgia	Oklahoma (1–0)	Oklahoma (2–0)	Tennessee (2–1)	Tennessee (3–1)	Clemson (4–1)	Iowa (5–1)	Arkansas (5–1)	Boise State (8–0)	Rutgers (8–0)	Rutgers (8–0)	Auburn (9–2)	Rutgers (9–1)	West Virginia (9–2)	Wake Forest (11–2)	Arkansas (10–4)	15.
16.	Iowa	Virginia Tech (1–0)	Iowa (2–0)	TCU (3–0)	Oklahoma (3–1)	California (4–1)	Georgia (5–1)	Oregon (5–1)	Rutgers (7–0)	Boston College (7–1)	Wisconsin (9–1)	Oklahoma (8–2)	Georgia Tech (9–2)	Wake Forest (10–2)	Rutgers (10–2)	BYU (11–2)	16.
17.	Virginia Tech	Miami (FL) (0–1)	Miami (FL) (1–1)	Oklahoma (2–1)	TCU (3–0)	Florida State (3–1)	Arkansas (4–1)	Nebraska (6–1)	Wisconsin (7–1)	Wisconsin (8–1)	Oklahoma (7–2)	California (8–2)	Virginia Tech (9–2)	Tennessee (9–3) т	Tennessee (9–3)	Notre Dame (10–3)	17.
18.	Clemson	Clemson (1–0)	Oregon (2–0)	Florida State (2–1)	Clemson (3–1)	Georgia Tech (4–1)	Oregon (5–1)	Boise State (6–0)	Boston College (6–1)	Oklahoma (6–2)	Wake Forest (8–1)	Georgia Tech (8–2)	Boston College (9–2)	Texas (9–3) т	Texas (9–3)	Wake Forest (11–3)	18.
19.	Penn State	Penn State (1–0)	Nebraska (2–0)	Clemson (2–1)	Florida State (3–1)	Iowa (4–1)	Missouri (6–0)	Rutgers (6–0)	Oklahoma (5–2)	Clemson (7–2)	Georgia Tech (7–2)	Virginia Tech (8–2)	Tennessee (8–3)	Nebraska (9–3)	BYU (10–2)	Virginia Tech (10–3)	19.
20.	Nebraska	Oregon (1–0)	TCU (2–0)	Boston College (3–0)	California (3–1)	Boise State (5–0)	Boise State (6–0)	Oklahoma (4–2)	Nebraska (6–2)	Georgia Tech (6–2)	Virginia Tech (7–2)	Boston College (8–2)	Wake Forest (9–2)	BYU (10–2)	California (9–3)	Boston College (10–3)	20.
21.	Oregon	Nebraska (1–0)	California (1–1)	California (2–1)	Nebraska (3–1)	Virginia Tech (4–1)	Nebraska (5–1)	Wisconsin (6–1)	Georgia Tech (5–2)	Texas A&M (8–1)	Oregon (7–2)	Maryland (8–2)	BYU (9–2)	California (8–3)	Texas A&M (9–3)	Oregon State (10–4)	21.
22.	TCU	California (0–1)	Arizona State (2–0)	Arizona State (3–0)	Boise State (4–0)	Nebraska (4–1)	Virginia Tech (4–1)	Boston College (5–1)	Texas A&M (7–1)	Wake Forest (7–1)	Boston College (7–2)	Tennessee (7–3)	California (8–3)	Texas A&M (9–3)	Nebraska (9–4)	TCU (11–2)	22.
23.	Tennessee	TCU (1–0)	Boston College (2–0)	Nebraska (2–1)	Rutgers (4–0)	Missouri (5–0)	Oklahoma (3–2)	Texas A&M (6–1)	Missouri (7–1)	Virginia Tech (6–2)	Maryland (7–2)	BYU (8–2)	Nebraska (8–3)	Georgia Tech (9–3)	Boston College (9–3)	Georgia (9–4)	23.
24.	Arizona State	Texas Tech (1–0)	Texas Tech (2–0)	Penn State (2–1)	Georgia Tech (3–1)	Rutgers (5–0)	Rutgers (5–0)	Missouri (6–1)	Wake Forest (6–1)	Oregon (6–2)	Texas A&M (8–2)	Nebraska (8–3)	Clemson (8–3)	Hawaiʻi (10–2)	Oregon State (9–4)	Penn State (9–4)	24.
25.	Texas Tech	Arizona State (1–0)	Penn State (1–1)	Boise State (3–0)	Missouri (4–0)	Boston College (4–1)	Wisconsin (5–1)	Wake Forest (6–1)	Oregon (5–2)	Washington State (6–3)	BYU (7–2)	Clemson (8–3)	Hawaiʻi (9–2)	Boston College (9–3)	TCU (10–2)	Tennessee (9–4)	25.
	Preseason	Week 1 Sept 5	Week 2 Sept 10	Week 3 Sept 17	Week 4 Sept 24	Week 5 Oct 1	Week 6 Oct 8	Week 7 Oct 15	Week 8 Oct 22	Week 9 Oct 29	Week 10 Nov 5	Week 11 Nov 12	Week 12 Nov 19	Week 13 Nov 26	Week 14 Dec 3	Week 15 (Final) Jan 9	
		Dropped: None	Dropped: Clemson	Dropped: Miami (FL); Texas Tech	Dropped: Boston College; Arizona State; Penn State	Dropped: TCU	Dropped: Florida State; Boston College	Dropped: Iowa; Georgia; Virginia Tech	Dropped: None	Dropped: Nebraska; Missouri	Dropped: Clemson; Washington State	Dropped: Oregon; Texas A&M	Dropped: Maryland	Dropped: Clemson	Dropped: Georgia Tech; Hawaiʻi	Dropped: Texas A&M; Nebraska	

== Coaches Poll ==
Jim Tressel, head coach of the Ohio State Buckeyes, refused to vote in the Week 15 poll, citing a conflict of interest. In a change to the Coaches Poll for the 2006 season, the final ballots are made public. Tressel did not want his vote of picking Florida or Michigan to play against his team to be known publicly and therefore refused to vote and was an unprecedented move in that no Coaches Poll voter has ever refused to vote.

	Preseason	Week 1 Sept 5	Week 2 Sept 10	Week 3 Sept 17	Week 4 Sept 24	Week 5 Oct 1	Week 6 Oct 8	Week 7 Oct 15	Week 8 Oct 22	Week 9 Oct 29	Week 10 Nov 5	Week 11 Nov 12	Week 12 Nov 19	Week 13 Nov 26	Week 14 Dec 3	Week 15 (Final) Jan 9	
1.	Ohio State (28)	Ohio State (1–0) (41)	Ohio State (2–0) (59)	Ohio State (3–0) (60)	Ohio State (4–0) (59)	Ohio State (5–0) (62)	Ohio State (6–0) (62)	Ohio State (7–0) (63)	Ohio State (8–0) (63)	Ohio State (9–0) (63)	Ohio State (10–0) (63)	Ohio State (11–0) (62)	Ohio State (12–0) (63)	Ohio State (12–0) (63)	Ohio State (12–0) (62)	Florida (13–1) (63)	1.
2.	Texas (11)	Texas (1–0) (14)	USC (2–0) (2)	USC (3–0) (2)	USC (3–0) (2)	USC (4–0)	USC (5–0)	USC (6–0)	USC (6–0)	Michigan (9–0)	Michigan (10–0)	Michigan (11–0) (1)	USC (9–1)	USC (10–1)	Florida (12–1)	Ohio State (12–1)	2.
3.	Notre Dame (9) т	USC (1–0) (4)	Notre Dame (2–0) (1)	Auburn (3–0) (1)	Auburn (4–0) (2)	Auburn (5–0) (1)	Florida (6–0) (1)	Michigan (7–0)	Michigan (8–0)	West Virginia (7–0)	Texas (9–1)	Florida (9–1)	Michigan (11–1)	Michigan (11–1)	Michigan (11–1)	LSU (11–2)	3.
4.	USC (1) т	Auburn (1–0) (2)	Auburn (2–0) (1)	West Virginia (3–0)	West Virginia (4–0)	West Virginia (4–0)	West Virginia (5–0)	West Virginia (6–0)	West Virginia (7–0)	Texas (8–1)	Louisville (8–0)	USC (8–1)	Florida (10–1)	Florida (11–1)	LSU (10–2)	USC (11–2)	4.
5.	Oklahoma (13)	Notre Dame (1–0) (2) т	West Virginia (2–0)	Florida (3–0)	Florida (4–0)	Florida (5–0)	Michigan (6–0)	Texas (6–1)	Texas (7–1)	Louisville (7–0)	Auburn (9–1)	Notre Dame (9–1)	Arkansas (10–1)	LSU (10–2)	Wisconsin (11–1)	Wisconsin (12–1)	5.
6.	Auburn (1)	West Virginia (1–0) т	Florida (2–0)	Michigan (3–0)	Michigan (4–0)	Michigan (5–0)	Texas (5–1)	Louisville (6–0)	Louisville (7–0)	Auburn (8–1)	Florida (8–1)	Arkansas (9–1)	Notre Dame (10–1)	Wisconsin (11–1)	Louisville (11–1)	Boise State (13–0)	6.
7.	West Virginia	Florida (1–0)	LSU (2–0)	Georgia (3–0)	Texas (3–1)	Texas (4–1)	Louisville (5–0)	Auburn (6–1)	Auburn (7–1)	Florida (7–1)	USC (7–1)	West Virginia (8–1)	West Virginia (9–1)	Louisville (10–1)	USC (10–2)	Louisville (12–1)	7.
8.	Florida	LSU (1–0)	Texas (1–1)	Texas (2–1)	Louisville (4–0)	Louisville (4–0)	Notre Dame (5–1)	Notre Dame (5–1)	Florida (6–1)	Tennessee (7–1)	Notre Dame (8–1)	Rutgers (9–0)	LSU (9–2)	Arkansas (10–2)	Oklahoma (11–2)	Auburn (11–2)	8.
9.	LSU	Florida State (1–0)	Georgia (2–0)	Louisville (3–0)	Georgia (4–0)	Georgia (5–0)	Tennessee (5–1)	Tennessee (5–1)	Tennessee (6–1)	USC (6–1)	California (8–1)	LSU (8–2)	Wisconsin (11–1)	Boise State (12–0)	Boise State (12–0)	Michigan (11–2)	9.
10.	Florida State	Oklahoma (1–0)	Florida State (2–0)	Virginia Tech (3–0)	Virginia Tech (4–0) т	LSU (4–1)	Auburn (5–1)	Florida (6–1)	Notre Dame (6–1)	Notre Dame (7–1)	West Virginia (7–1)	Wisconsin (10–1)	Texas (9–2)	Oklahoma (10–2)	Auburn (10–2)	West Virginia (11–2)	10.
11.	Miami (FL)	Georgia (1–0)	Oklahoma (2–0)	LSU (2–1)	LSU (3–1) т	Oregon (4–0)	California (5–1)	California (6–1)	Clemson (7–1)	California (7–1)	Arkansas (8–1)	Texas (9–2)	Louisville (9–1)	Auburn (10–2)	Notre Dame (10–2)	Oklahoma (11–3)	11.
12.	California	Louisville (1–0)	Louisville (2–0)	Oregon (3–0)	Oregon (4–0)	Notre Dame (4–1)	Clemson (5–1)	Clemson (6–1)	California (7–1) т	Arkansas (7–1)	LSU (7–2)	Louisville (8–1)	Boise State (11–0)	Notre Dame (10–2)	West Virginia (10–2)	Rutgers (11–2)	12.
13.	Louisville	Michigan (1–0)	Michigan (2–0)	Notre Dame (2–1)	Iowa (4–0)	Oklahoma (3–1)	Iowa (5–1)	Georgia Tech (5–1)	LSU (6–2) т	LSU (6–2)	Boise State (9–0)	Boise State (10–0)	Auburn (10–2)	Rutgers (10–1)	Arkansas (10–3)	Texas (10–3)	13.
14.	Georgia	Virginia Tech (1–0)	Virginia Tech (2–0)	Iowa (3–0)	Notre Dame (3–1)	Tennessee (4–1)	Georgia (5–1)	LSU (5–2)	Arkansas (6–1)	Boise State (8–0)	Rutgers (8–0)	Wake Forest (9–1)	Oklahoma (9–2)	Virginia Tech (10–2)	Virginia Tech (10–2)	California (10–3)	14.
15.	Michigan	Iowa (1–0)	Miami (FL) (1–1)	TCU (3–0)	TCU (4–0)	Clemson (4–1)	Georgia Tech (5–1)	Oregon (5–1)	Boise State (8–0)	Rutgers (8–0)	Tennessee (7–2)	Auburn (9–2)	Georgia Tech (9–2)	West Virginia (9–2)	Wake Forest (11–2)	BYU (11–2)	15.
16.	Virginia Tech	Miami (FL) (0–1)	Iowa (2–0)	Oklahoma (2–1)	Oklahoma (3–1)	Florida State (3–1)	LSU (4–2)	Nebraska (6–1)	Rutgers (7–0)	Boston College (7–1)	Wisconsin (9–1) т	Oklahoma (8–2)	Rutgers (9–1)	Wake Forest (10–2)	Texas (9–3)	Arkansas (10–4)	16.
17.	Iowa	Tennessee (1–0)	Tennessee (2–0)	Florida State (2–1)	Florida State (3–1)	California (4–1)	Virginia Tech (4–1)	Boise State (7–0)	Boston College (6–1)	Wisconsin (8–1)	Oklahoma (7–2) т	California (8–2)	Virginia Tech (9–2)	Texas (9–3)	Rutgers (10–2)	Wake Forest (11–3)	17.
18.	Clemson	Clemson (1–0)	Oregon (2–0)	Arizona State (3–0)	Tennessee (3–1)	Virginia Tech (4–1)	Oregon (4–1)	Arkansas (5–1)	Wisconsin (7–1)	Oklahoma (6–2)	Georgia Tech (7–2)	Georgia Tech (8–2)	Boston College (9–2)	Nebraska (9–3)	Tennessee (9–3)	Virginia Tech (10–3)	18.
19.	Penn State	Penn State (1–0)	Nebraska (2–0)	Tennessee (2–1)	Clemson (3–1)	Iowa (4–1)	Boise State (6–0)	Rutgers (6–0)	Oklahoma (5–2)	Clemson (7–2)	Wake Forest (8–1)	Virginia Tech (8–2)	Nebraska (8–3)	Tennessee (9–3)	California (9–3)	Notre Dame (10–3)	19.
20.	Oregon	Oregon (1–0)	TCU (2–0)	California (2–1)	California (3–1)	Georgia Tech (4–1)	Nebraska (5–1)	Oklahoma (4–2)	Nebraska (6–2)	Georgia Tech (6–2)	Oregon (7–2)	Boston College (8–2)	Wake Forest (9–2)	California (8–3)	BYU (10–2)	Boston College (10–3)	20.
21.	TCU	Nebraska (1–0)	California (1–1)	Boston College (3–0)	Nebraska (3–1)	Boise State (5–0)	Missouri (6–0)	Boston College (5–1)	Georgia Tech (5–2)	Texas A&M (8–1)	Virginia Tech (7–2)	Maryland (8–2)	Tennessee (8–3)	BYU (10–2)	Texas A&M (9–3)	TCU (11–2)	21.
22.	Nebraska	TCU (1–0)	Texas Tech (2–0)	Alabama (3–0)	Boise State (4–0)	Nebraska (4–1)	Oklahoma (3–2)	Wisconsin (6–1)	Texas A&M (7–1)	Oregon (6–2)	Boston College (7–2)	Nebraska (8–3)	California (8–3)	Georgia Tech (9–3)	Nebraska (9–4)	Oregon State (10–4)	22.
23.	Tennessee	California (0–1)	Arizona State (2–0)	Clemson (2–1)	Rutgers (4–0)	Rutgers (5–0)	Arkansas (4–1)	Iowa (5–2)	Missouri (7–1)	Wake Forest (7–1)	Texas A&M (8–2)	Tennessee (7–3)	BYU (9–2)	Hawaiʻi (10–2)	Boston College (9–3)	Tennessee (9–4)	23.
24.	Alabama	Texas Tech (1–0)	Alabama (2–0)	Nebraska (2–1)	Texas Tech (3–1)	Texas Tech (4–1)	Rutgers (5–0)	Georgia (5–2)	Oregon (5–2)	Virginia Tech (6–2)	Maryland (7–2)	BYU (8–2)	Clemson (8–3)	Texas A&M (9–3)	TCU (10–2)	Hawaiʻi (11–3)	24.
25.	Texas Tech	Alabama (1–0)	Boston College (2–0)	Boise State (3–0)	Boston College (3–1)	Missouri (5–0)	Boston College (4–1)	Texas A&M (6–1)	Georgia (6–2)	Missouri (7–2)	Nebraska (7–3)	Clemson (8–3)	Hawaiʻi (9–2)	Boston College (9–3)	Georgia Tech (9–4) т	Penn State (9–4)	25.
25.	Texas Tech	Alabama (1–0)	Boston College (2–0)	Boise State (3–0)	Boston College (3–1)	Missouri (5–0)	Boston College (4–1)	Texas A&M (6–1)	Georgia (6–2)	Missouri (7–2)	Nebraska (7–3)	Clemson (8–3)	Hawaiʻi (9–2)	Boston College (9–3)	Oregon State (9–4) т	Penn State (9–4)	25.
	Preseason	Week 1 Sept 5	Week 2 Sept 10	Week 3 Sept 17	Week 4 Sept 24	Week 5 Oct 1	Week 6 Oct 8	Week 7 Oct 15	Week 8 Oct 22	Week 9 Oct 29	Week 10 Nov 5	Week 11 Nov 12	Week 12 Nov 19	Week 13 Nov 26	Week 14 Dec 3	Week 15 (Final) Jan 9	
		Dropped: None	Dropped: Clemson; Penn State	Dropped: Miami (FL); Texas Tech	Dropped: Arizona State; Alabama	Dropped: TCU; Boston College	Dropped: Florida State; Texas Tech	Dropped: Virginia Tech; Missouri	Dropped: Iowa	Dropped: Georgia; Nebraska	Dropped: Clemson; Missouri	Dropped: Oregon; Texas A&M	Dropped: Maryland	Dropped: Clemson	Dropped: Hawaiʻi	Dropped: Texas A&M; Nebraska; Georgia Tech	

== Harris Interactive Poll ==
	Week 4 Sept 24	Week 5 Oct 1	Week 6 Oct 8	Week 7 Oct 15	Week 8 Oct 22	Week 9 Oct 29	Week 10 Nov 5	Week 11 Nov 12	Week 12 Nov 19	Week 13 Nov 26	Week 14 (Final) Dec 3	
1.	Ohio State (4–0) (107)	Ohio State (5–0) (110)	Ohio State (6–0) (112)	Ohio State (7–0) (112)	Ohio State (8–0) (112)	Ohio State (9–0) (113)	Ohio State (10–0) (113)	Ohio State (11–0) (112)	Ohio State (12–0) (114)	Ohio State (12–0) (114)	Ohio State (12–0) (112)	1.
2.	USC (3–0) (4)	USC (4–0) (2)	USC (5–0) (1)	Michigan (7–0) (1)	Michigan (8–0) (1)	Michigan (9–0)	Michigan (10–0)	Michigan (11–0)	USC (9–1)	USC (10–1)	Florida (12–1) (1)	2.
3.	Auburn (4–0) (2)	Auburn (5–0) (1)	Florida (6–0) (1)	USC (6–0) (1)	USC (6–0)	West Virginia (7–0) (1)	Louisville (8–0) (1)	USC (8–1)	Michigan (11–1)	Michigan (11–1)	Michigan (11–1)	3.
4.	West Virginia (4–0)	Michigan (5–0)	Michigan (6–0)	West Virginia (6–0)	West Virginia (7–0)	Texas (8–1)	Texas (9–1)	Florida (9–1)	Florida (10–1)	Florida (11–1)	LSU (10–2)	4.
5.	Michigan (4–0)	Florida (5–0) (1) т	West Virginia (5–0)	Texas (6–1)	Texas (7–1)	Louisville (7–0)	Auburn (8–1)	Notre Dame (9–1)	Notre Dame (10–1)	LSU (10–2)	Louisville (11–1)	5.
6.	Florida (4–0)	West Virginia(4–0) т	Texas (5–1)	Louisville (6–0)	Louisville (7–0)	Auburn (8–1)	Florida (8–1)	Arkansas (9–1)	Arkansas (10–1)	Wisconsin (11–1)	Wisconsin (11–1)	6.
7.	Louisville (4–0)	Louisville (4–0)	Louisville (5–0)	Auburn (6–1)	Auburn (7–1)	Florida (7–1)	USC (7–1)	Rutgers (9–0)	West Virginia (9–1)	Louisville (10–1)	USC (10–2)	7.
8.	Texas (3–1)	Texas (4–1)	Tennessee (5–1)	Tennessee (5–1)	Tennessee (6–1)	Tennessee (7–1)	Notre Dame (8–1)	West Virginia (8–1)	LSU (9–2)	Arkansas (10–2)	Oklahoma (11–2)	8.
9.	Georgia (4–0)	LSU (4–1)	Notre Dame (5–1)	Florida (6–1)	Florida (6–1)	USC (6–1)	California (8–1)	LSU (8–2)	Wisconsin (11–1)	Boise State (12–0)	Boise State (12–0)	9.
10.	LSU (3–1)	Georgia (5–0)	Auburn (5–1)	Notre Dame (5–1)	Notre Dame (6–1)	Notre Dame (7–1)	West Virginia (7–1)	Louisville (8–1)	Louisville (9–1)	Notre Dame (10–2)	Auburn (10–2) т	10.
11.	Virginia Tech (4–0)	Oregon (4–0)	California (5–1)	California (6–1)	California (7–1)	California (7–1)	Arkansas (8–1)	Wisconsin (10–1)	Texas (9–2)	Oklahoma (10–2)	Notre Dame (10–2) т	11.
12.	Notre Dame (3–1)	Notre Dame (4–1)	Clemson (5–1)	Clemson (6–1)	Clemson (7–1)	Arkansas (7–1)	LSU (7–2)	Texas (9–2)	Boise State (11–0)	Auburn (10–2)	West Virginia (10–2)	12.
13.	Oregon (3–0)	Tennessee (4–1)	Iowa (5–1)	Georgia Tech (5–1)	LSU (6–2)	LSU (6–2)	Rutgers (8–0)	Boise State (10–0)	Auburn (10–2)	Rutgers (10–1)	Arkansas (10–3)	13.
14.	Iowa (4–0)	Oklahoma (3–1)	Georgia (5–1)	LSU (5–2)	Arkansas (6–1)	Rutgers (8–0)	Boise State (8–0)	Wake Forest (9–1)	Oklahoma (9–2)	Virginia Tech (10–2)	Wake Forest (11–2)	14.
15.	Tennessee (3–1)	Clemson (4–1)	Georgia Tech (5–1)	Oregon (5–1)	Rutgers (7–0)	Boise State (8–0)	Tennessee (7–2)	Auburn (9–2)	Rutgers (9–1)	West Virginia (9–2)	Virginia Tech (10–2)	15.
16.	Oklahoma (3–1)	California (4–1)	LSU (4–2)	Nebraska (6–1)	Boise State (8–0)	Boston College (7–1)	Wisconsin (9–1)	Oklahoma (9–2)	Georgia Tech (9–2)	Wake Forest (10–2)	Rutgers (10–2)	16.
17.	TCU (3–0)	Florida State (3–1)	Missouri (6–0)	Arkansas (5–1)	Boston College (6–1)	Wisconsin (8–1)	Oklahoma (7–2)	California (8–2)	Virginia Tech (9–2)	Texas (9–3)	Texas (9–3)	17.
18.	California (3–1)	Iowa (4–1)	Virginia Tech (4–1)	Boise State (6–0)	Wisconsin (7–1)	Oklahoma (6–2)	Wake Forest (8–1)	Georgia Tech (8–2)	Boston College (9–2)	Tennessee (9–3)	Tennessee (9–3)	18.
19.	Clemson (3–1)	Virginia Tech (4–1)	Nebraska (5–1)	Rutgers (6–0)	Oklahoma (5–2)	Clemson (7–2)	Georgia Tech (7–2)	Virginia Tech (8–2)	Tennessee (8–3)	BYU (10–2)	BYU (10–2)	19.
20.	Florida State (3–1)	Georgia Tech (4–1)	Oregon (4–1)	Oklahoma (4–2)	Nebraska (6–2)	Georgia Tech (6–2)	Oregon (7–2)	Boston College (8–2)	Wake Forest (9–2)	Nebraska (9–3)	California (9–3)	20.
21.	Nebraska (3–1)	Nebraska (4–1)	Boise State (6–0)	Boston College (5–1)	Missouri (7–1)	Texas A&M (8–1)	Virginia Tech (7–2)	Maryland (8–2)	BYU (9–2)	California (8–3)	Texas A&M (9–3)	21.
22.	Boise State (4–0)	Boise State (5–0)	Arkansas (4–1)	Wisconsin (6–1)	Georgia Tech (5–2)	Oregon (6–2)	Boston College (7–2)	Tennessee (7–3)	Nebraska (8–3)	Georgia Tech (9–3)	Nebraska (9–4)	22.
23.	Rutgers (4–0)	Missouri (5–0)	Oklahoma (3–2)	Iowa (5–2)	Texas A&M (7–1)	Wake Forest (7–1)	Maryland (7–2)	Nebraska (8–3)	California (8–3)	Hawaiʻi (10–2)	Boston College (9–3)	23.
24.	Missouri (4–0)	Rutgers (5–0)	Rutgers (5–0)	Georgia (5–2)	Oregon (5–2)	Virginia Tech (6–2)	Texas A&M (8–2)	BYU (8–2)	Clemson (8–3)	Texas A&M (9–3)	TCU (10–2)	24.
25.	Boston College (3–1)	Boston College (4–1)	Boston College (4–1)	Missouri (6–1)	Wake Forest (6–1)	Tulsa (7–1)	Nebraska (7–3)	Oregon (7–3)	Hawaiʻi (9–2)	Boston College (9–3)	Georgia Tech (9–4)	25.
	Week 4 Sept 24	Week 5 Oct 1	Week 6 Oct 8	Week 7 Oct 15	Week 8 Oct 22	Week 9 Oct 29	Week 10 Nov 5	Week 11 Nov 12	Week 12 Nov 19	Week 13 Nov 26	Week 14 (Final) Dec 3	
		Dropped: TCU	Dropped: Florida State	Dropped: Virginia Tech	Dropped: Georgia; Iowa	Dropped: Missouri; Nebraska	Dropped: Clemson; Tulsa	Dropped: Texas A&M	Dropped: Maryland; Oregon	Dropped: Clemson	Dropped: Hawaiʻi	

== BCS standings ==
The Bowl Championship Series (BCS) determined the two teams that competed in the 2007 BCS National Championship Game.

	Week 7 Oct 15	Week 8 Oct 22	Week 9 Oct 29	Week 10 Nov 5	Week 11 Nov 12	Week 12 Nov 19	Week 13 Nov 26	Week 14 (Final) Dec 3	
1.	Ohio State (7–0)	Ohio State (8–0)	Ohio State (9–0)	Ohio State (10–0)	Ohio State (11–0)	Ohio State (12–0)	Ohio State (12–0)	Ohio State (12–0)	1.
2.	USC (6–0)	Michigan (8–0)	Michigan (9–0)	Michigan (10–0)	Michigan (11–0)	Michigan (11–1)	USC (10–1)	Florida (12–1)	2.
3.	Michigan (7–0)	USC (6–0)	West Virginia (7–0)	Louisville (8–0)	USC (8–1)	USC (9–1)	Michigan (11–1)	Michigan (11–1)	3.
4.	Auburn (6–1)	West Virginia (7–0)	Florida (7–1)	Florida (8–1)	Florida (9–1)	Florida (10–1)	Florida (11–1)	LSU (10–2)	4.
5.	West Virginia (6–0)	Auburn (7–1)	Louisville (7–0)	Texas (9–1)	Notre Dame (9–1)	Notre Dame (10–1)	LSU (10–2)	USC (10–2)	5.
6.	Florida (6–1)	Florida (6–1)	Auburn (8–1)	Auburn (9–1)	Rutgers (9–0)	Arkansas (10–1)	Louisville (10–1)	Louisville (11–1)	6.
7.	Louisville (6–0)	Texas (7–1)	Texas (8–1)	USC (7–1)	Arkansas (9–1)	West Virginia (9–1)	Wisconsin (11–1)	Wisconsin (11–1)	7.
8.	Notre Dame (5–1)	Louisville (7–0)	USC (6–1)	California (8–1)	West Virginia (8–1)	Wisconsin (11–1)	Boise State (12–0)	Boise State (12–0)	8.
9.	Texas (6–1)	Notre Dame (6–1)	Notre Dame (7–1)	Notre Dame (8–1)	Wisconsin (10–1)	Louisville (9–1)	Arkansas (10–2)	Auburn (10–2)	9.
10.	California (6–1)	California (7–1)	California (7–1)	West Virginia (7–1)	Louisville (8–1)	LSU (9–2)	Notre Dame (10–2)	Oklahoma (11–2)	10.
11.	Tennessee (5–1)	Tennessee (6–1)	Tennessee (7–1)	Arkansas (8–1)	LSU (8–2)	Boise State (11–0)	Auburn (10–2)	Notre Dame (10–2)	11.
12.	Clemson (6–1)	Clemson (7–1)	Rutgers (8–0)	LSU (7–2)	Boise State (10–0)	Auburn (10–2)	Oklahoma (10–2)	Arkansas (10–3)	12.
13.	Arkansas (5–1)	Arkansas (6–1)	Arkansas (7–1)	Rutgers (8–0)	Texas (9–2)	Texas (9–2)	Rutgers (10–1)	West Virginia (10–2)	13.
14.	Oregon (5–1)	Rutgers (7–0)	Boise State (8–0)	Boise State (9–0)	Auburn (9–2)	Rutgers (9–1)	Virginia Tech (10–2)	Wake Forest (11–2)	14.
15.	Boise State (6–0)	Boise State (8–0)	Boston College (7–1)	Wisconsin (9–1)	California (8–2)	Oklahoma (9–2)	West Virginia (9–2)	Virginia Tech (10–2)	15.
16.	Rutgers (6–0)	LSU (6–2)	Wisconsin (8–1)	Tennessee (7–2)	Wake Forest (9–1)	Georgia Tech (9–2)	Tennessee (9–3)	Rutgers (10–2)	16.
17.	Nebraska (6–1)	Boston College (6–1)	LSU (6–2)	Oklahoma (7–2)	Oklahoma (8–2)	Virginia Tech (9–2)	Wake Forest (10–2)	Tennessee (9–3)	17.
18.	LSU (5–2)	Wisconsin (7–1)	Oklahoma (6–2)	Georgia Tech (7–2)	Georgia Tech (8–2)	Boston College (9–2)	California (8–3)	California (9–3)	18.
19.	Georgia Tech (5–1)	Oklahoma (5–2)	Clemson (7–2)	Wake Forest (8–1)	Maryland (8–2)	California (8–3)	Texas (9–3)	Texas (9–3)	19.
20.	Boston College (5–1)	Missouri (7–1)	Georgia Tech (6–2)	Oregon (7–2)	Boston College (8–2)	Tennessee (8–3)	Nebraska (9–3)	BYU (10–2)	20.
21.	Wisconsin (6–1)	Texas A&M (7–1)	Texas A&M (8–1)	Virginia Tech (7–2)	Virginia Tech (8–2)	Wake Forest (9–2)	BYU (10–2)	Texas A&M (9–3)	21.
22.	Oklahoma (4–2)	Nebraska (6–2)	Oregon (6–2)	Boston College (7–2)	Tennessee (7–3)	Nebraska (8–3)	Georgia Tech (9–3)	Oregon State (9–4)	22.
23.	Iowa (5–2)	Oregon (5–2)	Washington State (6–3)	Maryland (7–2)	Nebraska (8–3)	BYU (9–2)	Texas A&M (9–3)	Nebraska (9–4)	23.
24.	Missouri (6–1)	Georgia Tech (5–2)	Wake Forest (7–1)	Oregon State (6–3)	Oregon (7–3)	Clemson (8–3)	Oregon State (8–4)	Boston College (9–3)	24.
25.	Tulsa (5–1)	Washington State (5–3)	Virginia Tech (6–2)	Texas A&M (8–2)	BYU (8–2)	Penn State (8–4)	Hawaiʻi (10–2)	UCLA (7–5)	25.
	Week 7 Oct 15	Week 8 Oct 22	Week 9 Oct 29	Week 10 Nov 5	Week 11 Nov 12	Week 12 Nov 19	Week 13 Nov 26	Week 14 (Final) Dec 3	
		Dropped: Iowa; Tulsa	Dropped: Missouri; Nebraska	Dropped: Clemson; Washington State	Dropped: Oregon State; Texas A&M	Dropped: Maryland; Oregon	Dropped: Boston College; Clemson; Penn State	Dropped: Georgia Tech; Hawaiʻi	
