= Chuck Vincent (basketball) =

American former basketball player (born c. 1975)

Personal information
- Born: c. 1975
- Listed height: 6 ft 7 in (2.01 m)
- Listed weight: 235 lb (107 kg)

Career information
- High school: Northern (Durham, North Carolina)
- College: Furman (1994–1998)
- NBA draft: 1998: undrafted
- Position: Power forward / center

Career highlights
- SoCon co-Player of the Year (1998); 2× First-team All-SoCon (1997, 1998); Second-team All-SoCon (1996); SoCon Freshman of the Year (1995)

Charles "Chuck" Vincent (born c. 1975) is an American former basketball player known for his collegiate career at Furman University between 1994 and 1998.

After graduating from Northern High School in his hometown of Durham, North Carolina, Vincent made an immediate impact as a freshman while playing for the Paladins. He averaged 12.4 points and 8.7 rebounds per game and was named the Southern Conference (SoCon) Freshman of the Year in 1995. The next year, Vincent earned a Second Team All-Conference nod behind 15.0 points and 8.2 rebounds per game.

During Vincent's final two seasons he earned back-to-back First Team All-SoCon honors. As a junior he ranked 22nd nationally (1st in the SoCon) in rebounding with a 9.7 per game average, and then as a senior his 57.5% field goal percentage ranked 29th nationally. In Vincent's final three seasons he led Furman in both scoring and rebounding. Although he never led the Paladins to a postseason tournament berth, he was named the SoCon co-Player of the Year in 1997–98.

After college he played professionally in Finland.
