= Charles Vincent (historian) =

American historian

Charles Vincent (born 1945) is an American historian, professor, and author. He a professor in the history department at Southern University in Baton Rouge, Louisiana since 2017. Vincent serves as director of the Mwalimu Institute.

== Biography ==
Vincent was born on October 19, 1945, in Hazlehurst, Mississippi. Vincent was the first African American to receive a Ph.D. in history from LSU.

Vincent has written about African American legislators in Louisiana during the Reconstruction era as well as the history of Southern University and the town of Scotlandville where it is located. He is a fellow of the Louisiana Historical Association. He was interviewed for an oral history collection. He has written and spoken about Southern University's emergence after the Reconstruction era and its significance as the only Historically Black College and University (HBCU) system in the United States. He has also been a featured speaker on Reconstruction and Louisiana history. He has written book reviews.

== Bibliography ==
- Black Legislators in Louisiana During Reconstruction Louisiana State University Press, 1976
- A Centennial History of Southern University and A&M College, 1880-1980
- Images of America: Scotlandville Arcadia Publishing, 2015
