= 2006–07 NCAA football bowl games =

College football postseason game series

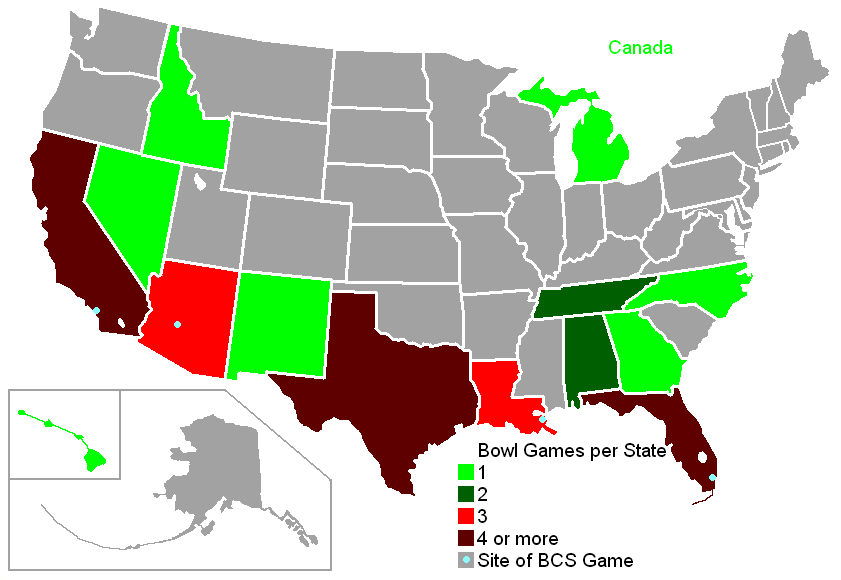
- Bowl sites by state
- Season: 2006
- Regular season: August 31 – December 2
- Number of bowls: 32
- All-star games: 5
- Bowl games: December 19, 2006 – January 8, 2007
- National Championship: 2007 BCS Championship Game
- Location of Championship: University of Phoenix Stadium, Glendale, Arizona
- Champions: Florida Gators
- Bowl Challenge Cup winner: Big East
Bowl record by conference
Conference	Bowls	Record	Number of teams in final AP poll
SEC	9	6–3 (0.667)	6
ACC	8	4–4 (0.500)	3
Big 12	8	3–5 (0.375)	2
Big Ten	7	2–5 (0.286)	4
Pac-10	6	3–3 (0.500)	3
Big East	5	5–0 (1.000)	3
Conference USA	5	1–4 (0.200)	0
Mountain West	4	3–1 (0.750)	2
WAC	4	3–1 (0.750)	1
MAC	4	1–3 (0.250)	0
Sun Belt	2	1–1 (0.500)	0
Independents	2	0–2 (0.000)	1

The 2006–07 NCAA football bowl games concluded the 2006 NCAA Division I FBS football season in college football.

A record of 32 team-competitive plus five all-star postseason games were played, with the addition of the new stand-alone Bowl Championship Series National Championship Game, the International Bowl in Toronto, Ontario (the first all-USA bowl game played outside the country since the 1937 Bacardi Bowl in Cuba), the Papajohns.com Bowl, the New Mexico Bowl, and the post-season-ending all-star Texas vs. The Nation Game. To fill the 64 available bowl slots from the 119 schools in the Bowl Subdivision, a record 7 teams (11% of all participants) with non-winning seasons participated in bowl games—all seven had a .500 (6-6) season.

Along with the increase in bowl games, the NCAA ruled that teams could schedule twelve regular-season games (up from eleven) beginning in the 2006 season. NCAA teams in Alaska and Hawaii, and their home opponents, are allowed to schedule an extra game over and above this limit. Two teams in any conferences with a championship final could play a 13th game in that conference championship [the Atlantic Coast Conference (ACC), Big 12 Conference, Conference USA (C-USA), Mid-American Conference (MAC), and Southeastern Conference (SEC)]. The increase in bowl games and season schedule resulted in the NCAA deciding to allow teams with a 6–6 record to be bowl eligible if either the team or their conference has negotiated a bowl contract.

== Selection of the teams ==
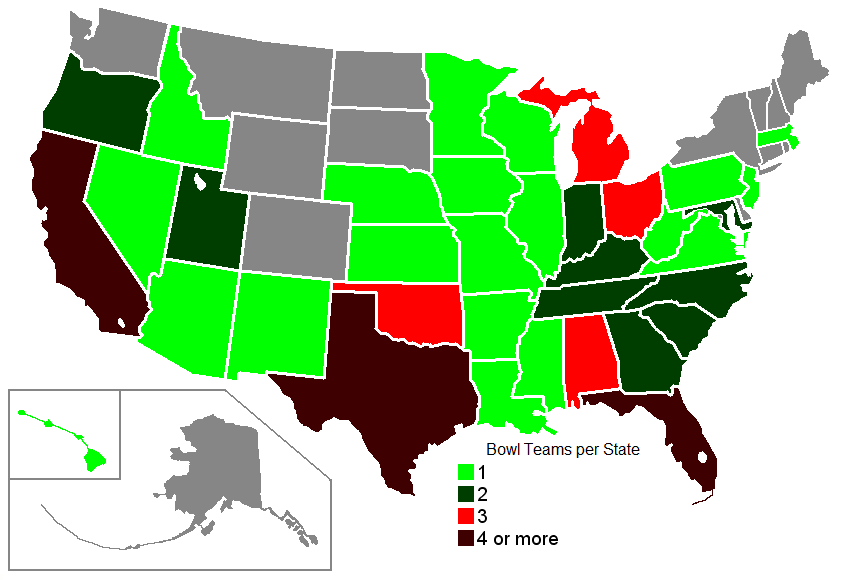
Number of bowl teams per state.

NCAA regulations stipulate any team finishing 6–6 can only be selected to fill a conference tie-in bowl slot once all other available conference teams are chosen. For example, the Big East had six bowl-eligible teams, but only five bowl tie-ins, so 6–6 Pittsburgh was automatically the odd team out. The same rule also applies to at-large bowl selections. With only a pair of at-large bowl positions available and two remaining 7–5 teams, the MAC's Northern Illinois's selection to the Poinsettia Bowl and the Sun Belt's Middle Tennessee's selection to the Motor City Bowl meant any remaining 6–6 teams had no chance of playing in a bowl game. Thus, this season marked the first time in NCAA history that every team with a winning record in the regular season played in a bowl game.

Besides Pitt, those who didn't go bowling with a .500 record were Kansas from the Big 12, Pac-10 members Arizona and Washington State, SMU from Conference USA, the MAC's Kent State, Sun Belt members Arkansas State and Louisiana–Lafayette and Mountain West member Wyoming, which drew controversy on the subject of the New Mexico Bowl, listed below.

NOTE: All payouts mentioned are in US$.

== Schedule ==
Date	Time	Game	Site	Matchup	Ref.
Non-BCS Bowls
Dec 19	8:00 p.m.	Poinsettia Bowl	Qualcomm Stadium; San Diego, CA	No. 25 TCU 37, Northern Illinois 7	
Dec 21	8:00 p.m.	Las Vegas Bowl	Sam Boyd Stadium; Whitney, NV	No. 19 BYU 38, Oregon 8	
Dec 22	8:00 p.m.	New Orleans Bowl	Louisiana Superdome; New Orleans, LA	Troy 41, Rice 17	
Dec 23	1:00 p.m.	PapaJohns.com Bowl	Legion Field; Birmingham, AL	South Florida 24, East Carolina 7	
Dec 23	4:30 p.m.	New Mexico Bowl	University Stadium; Albuquerque, NM	San Jose State 20, New Mexico 12	
Dec 23	8:00 p.m.	Armed Forces Bowl	Amon G. Carter Stadium; Fort Worth, TX	Utah 25, Tulsa 13	
Dec 24	8:00 p.m.	Hawaii Bowl	Aloha Stadium; Honolulu, HI	Hawaii 41, Arizona State 24	
Dec 26	7:30 p.m.	Motor City Bowl	Ford Field; Detroit, MI	Central Michigan 31, Middle Tennessee 14	
Dec 27	8:00 p.m.	Emerald Bowl	AT&T Park; San Francisco, CA	Florida State 44, UCLA 27	
Dec 28	4:30 p.m.	Independence Bowl	Independence Stadium; Shreveport, LA	Oklahoma State 34, Alabama 31	
Dec 28	8:00 p.m.	Texas Bowl	Reliant Stadium; Houston, TX	No. 16 Rutgers 37, Kansas State 10	
Dec 28	8:00 p.m.	Holiday Bowl	Qualcomm Stadium; San Diego, CA	No. 20 California 45, No. 21 Texas A&M 10	
Dec 29	1:00 p.m.	Music City Bowl	LP Field; Nashville, TN	Kentucky 28, Clemson 20	
Dec 29	2:00 p.m.	Sun Bowl	Sun Bowl; El Paso, TX	No. 24 Oregon State 39, Missouri 38	
Dec 29	4:30 p.m.	Liberty Bowl	Liberty Bowl Memorial Stadium; Memphis, TN	South Carolina 44, Houston 36	
Dec 29	7:30 p.m.	Insight Bowl	Sun Devil Stadium; Tempe, AZ	Texas Tech 44, Minnesota 41	
Dec 29	8:00 p.m.	Champs Sports Bowl	Florida Citrus Bowl; Orlando, FL	Maryland 24, Purdue 7	
Dec 30	1:00 p.m.	Meineke Car Care Bowl	Bank of America Stadium; Charlotte, NC	No. 23 Boston College 25, Navy 24	
Dec 30	4:30 p.m.	Alamo Bowl	Alamodome; San Antonio, TX	No. 18 Texas 26, Iowa 24	
Dec 30	8:00 p.m.	Chick-fil-A Bowl	Georgia Dome; Atlanta, GA	Georgia 31, No. 14 Virginia Tech 24	
Dec 31	7:30 p.m.	MPC Computers Bowl	Bronco Stadium; Boise, ID	Miami (FL) 21, Nevada 20	
Jan 1	11:00 a.m.	Outback Bowl	Raymond James Stadium; Tampa, FL	Penn State 20, No. 17 Tennessee 10	
Jan 1	11:30 a.m.	Cotton Bowl	Cotton Bowl; Dallas, TX	No. 10 Auburn 17, No. 22 Nebraska 14	
Jan 1	1:00 p.m.	Gator Bowl	Jacksonville Municipal Stadium; Jacksonville, FL	No. 13 West Virginia 38, Georgia Tech 35	
Jan 1	1:00 p.m.	Capital One Bowl	Florida Citrus Bowl; Orlando, FL	No. 6 Wisconsin 17, No. 12 Arkansas 14	
Jan 6	12:00 p.m.	International Bowl	Rogers Centre; Toronto, ON, Canada	Cincinnati 27, Western Michigan 24	
Jan 7	8:00 p.m.	GMAC Bowl	Ladd–Peebles Stadium; Mobile, AL	Southern Miss 28, Ohio 7	
BCS Bowls
Date	Time	Game	Site	Matchup	Ref.
Jan 1	5:00 p.m.	Rose Bowl	Rose Bowl; Pasadena, CA	No. 8 USC 32, No. 3 Michigan 18	
Jan 1	8:00 p.m.	Fiesta Bowl	University of Phoenix Stadium; Glendale, AZ	No. 9 Boise State 43, No. 7 Oklahoma 42	
Jan 2	8:00 p.m.	Orange Bowl	Dolphin Stadium; Miami Gardens, FL	No. 5 Louisville 24, No. 15 Wake Forest 13	
Jan 3	8:00 p.m.	Sugar Bowl	Louisiana Superdome; New Orleans, LA	No. 4 LSU 41, No. 11 Notre Dame 14	
Jan 8	8:00 p.m.	BCS National Championship Game	University of Phoenix Stadium; Glendale, AZ	No. 2 Florida 41, No. 1 Ohio State 14	
Rankings from AP Poll released prior to the game. All times are in Eastern Time.

== Non-BCS bowls ==
=== Poinsettia Bowl ===
- TCU (10–2) 37, Northern Illinois (7–5) 7

The post-season kicked off with the San Diego County Credit Union Poinsettia Bowl at San Diego's Qualcomm Stadium on December 19, 2006, the first of two scheduled bowl games in that stadium. The Mountain West's Texas Christian University Horned Frogs held the Mid-American Conference's NIU Huskies' star running back Garrett Wolfe to 28 yards en route to a 37–7 win. TCU quarterback Jeff Ballard rushed for three touchdowns and threw for another. The Horned Frogs entered the game ranked 25th in the final regular season AP Poll, while the Huskies entered the Poinsettia Bowl after finishing in third place in the MAC's West Division. Each team earned $750,000 for their conference by participating in the game. Among those in attendance were San Diego Chargers running backs LaDainian Tomlinson (TCU alumnus) and his backup, NIU alum Michael Turner.

=== Las Vegas Bowl ===
- Brigham Young (10–2) 38, Oregon (7–5) 8

The first meeting between a BCS AQ conference and a BCS non-AQ conference took place in the Pioneer Pure Vision Las Vegas Bowl on December 21 at the University of Nevada, Las Vegas's Sam Boyd Stadium in Whitney, Nevada. The Mountain West Conference champion Brigham Young University Cougars, led by game MVP tight end Jonny Harline, handily trounced the Pac 10's University of Oregon Ducks by a score of 38–8. Each team earned $950,000 for their conference by participating in the game.

=== New Orleans Bowl ===
- Troy (7–5) 41, Rice (7–5) 17

One relative newcomer to the Division I Bowl Subdivision, and one team that last won a bowl game in 1954, squared off in the R+L Carriers New Orleans Bowl, which returned to the Louisiana Superdome in the titular city on December 22 after the 2005 game was held at Cajun Field on the campus of University of Louisiana at Lafayette due to damage caused by Hurricane Katrina. Conference USA's Rice University Owls, who made their first post-season appearance in 45 years, were trounced by the Sun Belt Conference co-champion Troy University Trojans 41–17. The Trojans, winning their first bowl game in school history, were playing in their second post-season game in three years, having appeared two years beforehand in the now-defunct Silicon Valley Football Classic. Each team earned $325,000 for their conference by participating in the game. Troy quarterback Omar Haugabook and cornerback Elbert Mack were named co-MVPs.

=== Papajohns.com Bowl ===
- South Florida (8–4) 24, East Carolina (7–5) 7

The city known as the "Football Capital of the South" returned to the post-season for the first time since 1990 and the defunct All-American Bowl when Birmingham, Alabama's Legion Field hosted the inaugural Papajohns.com Bowl, the first of three games that were scheduled Saturday, December 23. Conference USA's East Carolina University, coached by Skip Holtz, the son of Lou Holtz, fell to the Big East's University of South Florida by the score of 24–7, in the Bulls' second post-season game in as many years, having been shut out 14–0, the last year in the Meineke Car Care Bowl by North Carolina State. Both teams earned a $300,000 paycheck for their conferences by playing this contest. Game MVP Benjamin Williams scored the game's historic first points as well as the Bulls' first points as a member of the Bowl Subdivision with a touchdown, one of two he scored, ninety seconds into the game. The game evened the BCS AQ/non-AQ tally at one game apiece.

=== New Mexico Bowl ===
- San Jose State (8–4) 20, New Mexico (6–6) 12

The second game of this December 23 triple-header was another first annual bowl game, the New Mexico Bowl, played at University Stadium on the campus of the University of New Mexico in Albuquerque. The Spartans of San Jose State University, representing the Western Athletic Conference, faced the host school, who represented the Mountain West. The Lobos were chosen over the University of Wyoming Cowboys, despite Wyoming beating them on said field, 14–10, on October 7, and having a better record in the MWC (5–3 vs. New Mexico's 4–4). John Broussard of the Spartans scored the first points in the bowl's history just ten seconds into the second quarter on a 78-yard pass from quarterback Adam Tafralis, and five turnovers did the Lobos in as SJSU won, 20–12. Each team earned $750,000 for their conference by participating in the game.

=== Armed Forces Bowl ===
- Utah (7–5) 25, Tulsa (8–4) 13

The last of three games on December 23 was the Bell Helicopters Armed Forces Bowl, formerly known as the Fort Worth Bowl, played at Texas Christian University's Amon G. Carter Stadium in Fort Worth, Texas. The Mountain West's University of Utah Utes trailed at the half, but beat Conference USA's Golden Hurricane of the University of Tulsa (which, like Utah, was once in the WAC), 25–13. Utah's versatile defensive back Eric Weddle helped lead the Utes by grabbing an interception and scoring a rushing touchdown. Each team earned $600,000 for their conference by participating in the game.

=== Hawaii Bowl ===
- Hawaii (10–3) 42, Arizona State (7–5) 24

The Christmas Eve tradition known as the Sheraton Hawaii Bowl returned to Aloha Stadium in Honolulu, Hawaii on December 24 as the host school, the University of Hawaii Warriors, representing the WAC, returning after a one-year absence because of a losing record, defeated the Pac 10's Sun Devils from Arizona State University, 41–24. Warriors quarterback Colt Brennan set a new NCAA record for most touchdown passes in a single season, breaking David Klingler's standard set in 1989 at Houston with his 55th touchdown toss in the second quarter. He then added three more to bring his final total to 58. This was Dirk Koetter's final game as the head coach of ASU, as Dennis Erickson will take over, coming in from Idaho. On top of the $398,000 for each team to divide among fellow conference members, the Pac-10 also gave Arizona State an additional $300,000 in travel expenses as "a special case" exemption. The Warriors' win gave the BCS non-AQ conferences a 3–1 lead in their rivalry.

=== Motor City Bowl ===
- Central Michigan (9–4) 31, Middle Tennessee (7–5) 14

The Motor City Bowl, played at Ford Field in Detroit, Michigan on December 26, featured the only newcomer to the Bowl Division in the 2006–07 campaign. The Blue Raiders of Middle Tennessee State University, co-champions of the Sun Belt Conference, made their bowl debut against the MAC champions, the Central Michigan University Chippewas, who won 31–14. Each school made $750,000 for their conferences. As MTSU was chosen as an at-large school after the Big Ten sent two teams to the BCS, and their 7–5 record shut out 6-6 Pitt (as, under NCAA FBS rules, a 6–6 team cannot be considered until all 7–5 teams have been assigned bowl slots, even if they are not "power conference" teams).

=== Emerald Bowl ===
- Florida State (6–6) 44, UCLA (7–5) 27

The Emerald Bowl was played at AT&T Park in San Francisco, home of the San Francisco Giants on December 27. The ACC's Florida State University Seminoles, who finished the regular season at 6–6, defeated the Pac-10's University of California Los Angeles Bruins 44–27, who were coming off defeating Southern California at home on December 2, eliminating them from national championship contention. Each team earned $850,000 for their conference by participating in the game.

=== Independence Bowl ===
- Oklahoma State (6–6) 34, Alabama (6–6) 31

The first of three games played on Thursday, December 28 was the PetroSun Independence Bowl played at Independence Stadium in Shreveport, Louisiana, pitting the SEC's University of Alabama Crimson Tide against the Big 12's Oklahoma State University Cowboys. With 8.9 seconds left in the game, Oklahoma State kicker Jason Ricks kicked a 27-yard field goal to defeat the Crimson Tide, 34–31. Alabama had mounted a 14-point comeback in the fourth quarter, with their last touchdown coming with 8:41 left to play. The SEC and Big 12, the conferences represented in this game, each received a check for $1.2 million. The Tide was coached on an interim basis by defensive coordinator Joe Kines (who had previously served as an interim coach at another SEC West school, the University of Arkansas, in the past) as this game was played between the firing of Mike Shula and the eventual hiring of Nick Saban.

=== Texas Bowl ===
- Rutgers (10–2) 37, Kansas State (7–5) 10

Rising from the ashes of the former Houston Bowl, the Texas Bowl was the second game played on December 28 at Reliant Stadium in Houston. Lone Star Sports and Entertainment, an arm of the Houston Texans, took over the game in June with NCAA approval, and for their first game saw the Big 12's Kansas State University Wildcats lose to the Big East runner-up, the Rutgers University Scarlet Knights, 37–10. The Wildcats earned $750,000 for the Big 12 as a gift of their participation, while Rutgers earned $500,000 for the Big East. The win was the first for college football's oldest program, having played its first game in 1869 against Princeton's Tigers, winning by a score of 6–4. Rutgers' Ray Rice scored two touchdowns and personally outgained the KSU offense 170 yards to 162 yards.

=== Music City Bowl ===
- Kentucky (7–5) 28, Clemson (8–4) 20

The Gaylord Hotels Music City Bowl presented by Bridgestone was the first of five games scheduled for December 29, the second-busiest schedule of games outside New Year's Day. In this game, played at LP Field in Nashville, the ACC's Clemson University Tigers lost to the SEC's University of Kentucky Wildcats, 28–20. Kentucky jumped to a big early lead; Clemson cut the margin late but not enough to win. Kentucky's Andre Woodson was the bowl game MVP. The two teams had last faced each other in the 1993 Peach Bowl; Kentucky has won 8 of the 12 meetings between the two teams. This was the first bowl win for the Wildcats since 1984. Each team earned $1.6 million for their conference by participating in the game.

=== Sun Bowl ===
- Oregon State (9–4) 39, Missouri (8–4) 38

The Brut Sun Bowl was the second of the five games played December 29, held in the self-named stadium in El Paso, Texas on the campus of UTEP, pitting the Big 12's University of Missouri Tigers against the Oregon State University Beavers from the Pac 10. Oregon State coach Mike Riley was told by Yvenson Bernard to go for the win. Bernard barely pushed into the end zone on the gutsy two-point conversion run, giving the 24th-ranked Beavers a 39–38 victory, having been down by 14 points earlier in the game. Among Missouri's big plays were a 40-yard catch by Chase Coffman that led to Temple's 7-yard scoring run on the opening drive. A 47-yard run by Temple was followed by an 18-yard touchdown pass from Chase Daniel to Coffman on the next play for a 38–24 lead with 12:08 left in the game. Missouri's Tony Temple missed setting a Sun Bowl record for rushing, which was 197 yards by Charles Alexander of LSU in 1977, by losing four yards on his final carry. Each team earned $1.9 million for their conference by participating in the game.

=== Liberty Bowl ===
- South Carolina (7–5) 44, Houston (10–3) 36

The third game on the docket for December 29 was the AutoZone Liberty Bowl at the self-named stadium in Memphis, Tennessee, pitting the Conference USA champions, the University of Houston Cougars against the SEC's University of South Carolina Gamecocks. Both teams had considerable success passing the ball in the second quarter; as a result, the halftime score had Houston leading 28–27. The shootout continued into the second half, however, South Carolina held off Houston to win by a score of 44–36. The offensive showcase set records for most points in the first half (55), most receiving yards (201 by Houston's Vincent Marshall), and most total yards gained (1,039 – 527 by Houston and 512 by South Carolina) and tied the record for touchdown passes by a single player (4 by South Carolina's Blake Mitchell). The conferences each received a check for $1.5 million for the teams' appearances.

=== Insight Bowl ===
- Texas Tech (7–5) 44, Minnesota (6–6) 41 (OT)

The fourth game in the quintet of contests scheduled on December 29 was the Insight Bowl, which moved from Chase Field in downtown Phoenix to Sun Devil Stadium on the campus of Arizona State University in nearby Tempe, former home of the Fiesta Bowl. The game pitted the Texas Tech University Red Raiders from the Big 12 against the Big Ten's University of Minnesota Twin Cities' Golden Gophers. The Gophers took a 38–7 lead midway through the third quarter, only to see the Red Raiders storm back to tie the game and eventually win in overtime in the biggest comeback ever in Division I FBS bowl history, surpassing Marshall's 30-point comeback against East Carolina in the 2001 GMAC Bowl. Each conference received a check for $1.2 million for their teams' appearances. Two days after the Gophers' collapse in the game left them with a losing record on the year, head coach Glen Mason was dismissed by the school's athletic department.

=== Champs Sports Bowl ===
- Maryland (8–4) 24, Purdue (8–5) 7

The fifth and final game December 29 pitted the University of Maryland, College Park Terrapins from the ACC and the Purdue University Boilermakers from the Big Ten in the Champs Sports Bowl, the first of two bowl games in four days played at the Citrus Bowl in Orlando, Florida. Maryland played an efficient and mistake-free game in cruising to a 24–7 victory. The Terrapins were able to dominate the game with a balanced offense and stingy defense that shutdown Purdue's potent passing game. Each team earned $2.25 million for their conference by participating in the game.

=== Meineke Car Care Bowl ===
- Boston College (9–3) 25, Navy (9–3) 24

The first game of three scheduled for Saturday, December 30 was the Meineke Car Care Bowl, played at Bank of America Stadium in Charlotte, North Carolina. In the game, the United States Naval Academy Midshipmen played against the Boston College Eagles from the ACC. Both teams received a $750,000 payment, with Navy keeping the entire amount as they play as an independent, while Boston College sent their check to their conference to be divided with all other bowl payouts. Walk-on placekicker Steve Aponavicius, who joined the team in October after the regular kicker was suspended, kicked the walk-off field goal as time expired to give Boston College their seventh straight bowl win, which leads the nation.

=== Alamo Bowl ===
- Texas (9–3) 26, Iowa (6–6) 24

The second contest on December 30 was the Alamo Bowl, played at the Alamodome in San Antonio, Texas. It pitted the defending 2005 national champions, the University of Texas Austin Longhorns, who did not make the 2006 Big 12 Championship Game, against the University of Iowa Hawkeyes from the Big Ten. The game, without corporate sponsorship for the first time as former title sponsor MasterCard pulled out, still paid each conference $2.2 million in television revenue for their participation. The 2006 meeting set a new attendance record for the bowl and the facility, at 65,875. The bowl would get a new sponsor in 2007 as Valero Energy, a San Antonio-based company assumed sponsorship of the game.

=== MPC Computers Bowl ===
- Miami (Florida) (6–6) 21, Nevada (8–4) 20

The only game to be played on New Year's Eve (December 31) was the MPC Computers Bowl on the Blue Turf of Bronco Stadium on the campus of Boise State University in the state capital of Idaho. The ACC's University of Miami Hurricanes, who were playing their final game for departing head coach Larry Coker, who was dismissed from his job after their regular season was completed, defeated the WAC's University of Nevada, Reno Wolf Pack by one point in a game that wasn't decided until the final minute. Both teams earned $250,000 for their conferences, and the BCS AQ conferences now had a 3–2 deficit against the BCS non-AQ conferences. Starting with the 2007 game, the title reverted to the "Humanitarian Bowl", with Roady's Truck Stops taking over as title sponsor.

=== International Bowl ===
- Cincinnati (7–5) 27, Western Michigan (8–4) 24

The first International Bowl featured the MAC's Western Michigan University Broncos and the University of Cincinnati Bearcats from the Big East Conference. The game was played on January 6, 2007, at Toronto, Ontario's Rogers Centre (formerly known as SkyDome) making it the first game played outside the United States since Notre Dame and Navy played their annual game in Dublin in 1996 and the first postseason game outside the U.S. since the Bacardi Bowl in Havana, Cuba back in 1937. The game's scoring came in three separate blocks, as Cincinnati jumped out to a 24–0 lead by the second quarter before WMU stormed back with 24 straight points of their own to tie the game. Immediately following WMU's tying touchdown in the 4th quarter, Cincinnati came back with a 12-play, 81-yard drive ending with a 33-yard field goal that provided the winning margin with 6:11 remaining in the game. The win by Cincinnati closed out a perfect bowl season for the Big East conference which went 5–0. Each school received a check for $750,000 (in US dollars) for their conferences to divide. New head coach Brian Kelly made his debut for the Bearcats, and five assistant coaches from Kelly's former job at Central Michigan followed him there. All five assistants had been on the CMU sidelines at the Motor City Bowl 11 days earlier, but without Kelly.

=== GMAC Bowl ===
- Southern Mississippi (9–4) 28, Ohio (9–4) 7

The last game before the BCS Championship was in Mobile, Alabama's Ladd–Peebles Stadium, where the GMAC Bowl was contested on Sunday, January 7. In the contest, played in an off-and-on rainstorm, the Ohio University Bobcats from the MAC were defeated by Conference USA's University of Southern Mississippi Golden Eagles by the score of 28–7. Each team earned $750,000 for their conference by participating in the game. The Golden Eagles' win avoided C-USA being totally shut out of the bowl win column.

== Non-BCS New Year's Day and other prestigious games ==
There are a half-dozen games that are not related to the BCS that are still notable for extra prestige, with very high payouts and many with New Year's Day games. Prestige includes the fact that some of the games are shown on over-the-air (or terrestrial) television networks like CBS, ABC or Fox rather than ESPN or NFL Network, which are cable/satellite channels.

=== Holiday Bowl ===
- California (9–3) 45, Texas A&M (9–3) 10

The Pacific Life Holiday Bowl was the first of the six prestigious non-BCS games and the third game to be played on December 28. It was played at Qualcomm Stadium in San Diego, California, which also hosts the Poinsettia Bowl. In this contest, the Texas A&M University Aggies, representing the Big 12, were routed by the University of California, Berkeley Golden Bears from the Pac-10, with the Bears coming out on top, 45–10. Each conference received $2.2 million for their team's participation.

=== Chick-fil-A Bowl ===
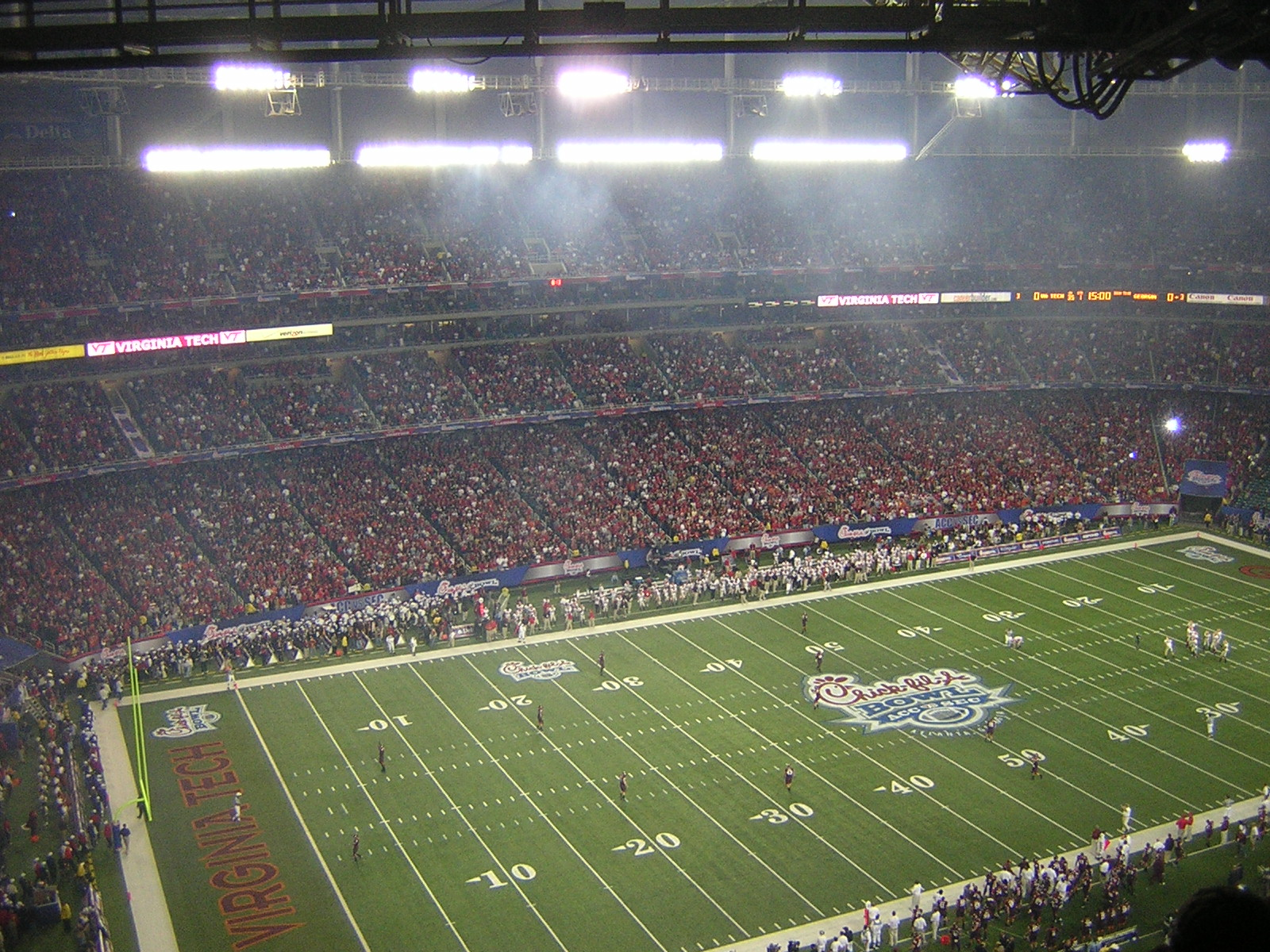
Virginia Tech and Georgia prepare to kick off at the 2006 Chick-fil-A Bowl

- Georgia (8–4) 31, Virginia Tech (10–2) 24

The Chick-fil-A Bowl (formerly the Peach Bowl), was the final contest of three games to be played on December 30, and was held at the Georgia Dome in Atlanta. The Virginia Polytechnic Institute and State University Hokies, representing the ACC, played against the University of Georgia Bulldogs, representing the SEC. In exchange for the right to pick the first ACC team after the BCS, the bowl paid $3.25 million to the ACC, with the SEC receiving $2.4 million. Virginia Tech jumped out to a 21–3 halftime lead, scoring on two one-yard touchdowns from tailback Brandon Ore and a 53-yard pass from flanker Eddie Royal to tight end Sam Wheeler. Georgia then scored 28 unanswered points in the second half and held off a late Tech rally to win 31–24.

=== Outback Bowl ===
- Penn State (8–4) 20, Tennessee (9–3) 10

The first bowl game scheduled for New Year's Day (January 1) was the Outback Bowl, which was played at Raymond James Stadium in Tampa, Florida, with the SEC's No. 17 University of Tennessee Volunteers challenging the Big Ten's unranked Pennsylvania State University Nittany Lions. Legendary Penn State coach Joe Paterno was set to return to the sidelines after an accident on the sidelines left him with a knee injury during their game at Wisconsin, but a steady drizzle throughout the game convinced the 80-year-old that he was not ready to return to the sidelines, instead staying in the press box and coaching the game from there. Thanks to an 88-yard return of a fumble for a touchdown by Nittany Lions' cornerback Tony Davis, JoePa won his record-extending 22nd post-season game 20–10. The schools each received a $3 million payment for their conferences. The win left Penn State ranked 24th in the nation.

=== Cotton Bowl Classic ===
- Auburn (10–2) 17, Nebraska (9–4) 14

Game number two on January 1 was the AT&T Cotton Bowl Classic, played at the self-named stadium on the site of the State Fair of Texas in Dallas. The Big 12's University of Nebraska at Lincoln's Cornhuskers played the Auburn University Tigers from the SEC in the annual game, with the Tigers prevailing 17–14. Each school's conference received $3 million.

=== Gator Bowl ===
- West Virginia (10–2) 38, Georgia Tech (9–4) 35

Jacksonville, Florida served the site for the third bowl game of New Year's Day, the Toyota Gator Bowl, played at Alltel Stadium. In the game, the West Virginia University Mountaineers from the Big East came back from an 18-point deficit to beat the ACC's Georgia Institute of Technology's Yellow Jackets by the score of 38–35, with the combined total of points (73) setting an all-time Gator Bowl record. The conferences each got a $2.5 million payment for their team's participation. 2007 marked the last time Toyota was the game's title sponsor, as Konica Minolta became the new sponsor starting with the 2008 event. It also marked the first time the game aired on CBS under the new TV contract.

=== Capital One Bowl ===
- Wisconsin (11–1) 17, Arkansas (10–3) 14

In Orlando, Florida, the fourth contest on New Year's Day and the last non-BCS prestigious bowl game to be played was at the Citrus Bowl in the Capital One Bowl, and featuring two teams that, due to BCS rules, were shut out as both the Big Ten and SEC sent two teams into the BCS, including the BCS Title Game. The University of Arkansas Razorbacks lost to the University of Wisconsin Badgers by a score of 17–14. Each conference received $4.25 million for their team's participation.

== Bowl Championship Series ==
All BCS games have a $17 million payout for BCS AQ conferences with a participating team. The two conferences with two BCS-bound teams, the Big Ten and the SEC, received an additional $4.5 million as per BCS rules. Independent school Notre Dame received an additional $4.5 million, keeping its entire $21.5 million the school. Boise State received $18,000,000 to share amongst BCS non-AQ Division I FBS conferences.

=== Rose Bowl ===
- Southern California (10–2) 32, Michigan (11–1) 18

The University of Southern California Trojans returned to the Rose Bowl Game presented by Citi in the first BCS game of 2007 on New Year's Day in Pasadena, California. Historically, the Rose Bowl has pitted the Pac-10 and Big Ten regular season champions. The Pac-10 champion Trojans played in a non-traditional Rose Bowl matchup with the University of Michigan Wolverines. What made this game a not-so-traditional matchup is that Michigan entered as the runner-up of the Big Ten, as the Big Ten champions Ohio State instead participated in the BCS Championship Game due to their No. 1 national ranking. Thanks to their win, the Trojans now hold a 6–2 lead in their eight meetings against the Wolverines in Pasadena.

=== Fiesta Bowl ===
- Boise State (12–0) 43, Oklahoma (11–2) 42 (OT)

Thanks to an unbeaten season and sitting inside the Top 12 teams in the final BCS survey, the Boise State University Broncos, champions of the Western Athletic Conference, earned their way into the BCS for a visit to the Tostitos Fiesta Bowl. They defeated the Big 12 champions, the University of Oklahoma Sooners, at the new University of Phoenix Stadium in Glendale, Arizona on New Year's Day. Many sports journalists hailed the game as an "instant classic" for its dramatic ending. Oklahoma scored 25 straight points in the second half to rally from an 18-point deficit and take the lead; the teams combined to score 22 points in the final 90 seconds. The Broncos used three successful trick plays to get to overtime then win the game: a hook and lateral play on 4th-and-18 to score the tying touchdown with seven seconds left, a halfback option pass for an overtime touchdown on 4th-and-2, and a Statue of Liberty play on a two-point conversion attempt to win the game. Not only did Boise State win, but they also claimed a fourth win for the BCS non-AQ conferences in seven games against BCS AQ conferences.

=== Orange Bowl ===
- Louisville (11–1) 24, Wake Forest (11–2) 13

The third BCS game, the FedEx Orange Bowl, was played at Dolphin Stadium in Miami Gardens, Florida on January 2, 2007. The Big East Conference champions, the University of Louisville Cardinals, beat the Wake Forest University Demon Deacons, winners of the ACC, 24–13. Louisville entered the game as heavy favorites, but their offense sputtered early and the game was tied 10–10 at halftime. Wake Forest took a 13–10 lead in the fourth quarter but Louisville scored two unanswered touchdowns on drives of 81 and 72 yards to take an 11-point lead, after which Wake Forest was unable to score. Brian Brohm completed 24 of 34 passes and was named the game's MVP. Brohm's 311 passing yards were the third most in Orange Bowl history, behind only Tom Brady (in 2000 for Michigan against Alabama) and Matt Leinart (in 2005 for Southern California against Oklahoma). In addition, the Cardinals' win clinched the ESPN-sponsored Bowl Challenge Cup as the much-maligned Big East, who were in their second year of their new football alignment, had a 4–0 record with one game remaining passing the Mountain West and Western Athletic Conferences, who had 3–1 records and completed their games.

=== Sugar Bowl ===
- LSU (10–2) 41, Notre Dame (10–2) 14

The fourth BCS game, the 73rd Allstate Sugar Bowl, the new corporate sponsor replacing Nokia, took place at the Louisiana Superdome in New Orleans on January 3, 2007, returning from Atlanta after a one-year absence due to Hurricane Katrina. The contest featured the University of Notre Dame Fighting Irish, an independent school, playing the Louisiana State University Tigers, representing the SEC. The Fighting Irish kept their $21.5 million payout, while LSU split up their $21.5 million among their SEC brethren. While the game was competitive early, LSU dominated the second half, scoring 20 points while shutting out Notre Dame, winning by a commanding score of 41–14. JaMarcus Russell threw for 331 yards—more yards than Notre Dame gained total—in a commanding performance. Brady Quinn struggled, completing 15 of 35 passes for only 149 yards and throwing two interceptions. Notre Dame has now lost an all-time record nine consecutive bowls; their last win came in the 1994 Cotton Bowl Classic against Texas A&M. That streak ended in the 2008 Hawaii Bowl.

=== BCS National Championship Game ===
- Florida (12–1) 41, Ohio State (12–0) 14

The final college football game of the marathon bowl season that had taken three weeks and had thirty-one prior contests was the Tostitos 2007 BCS National Championship Game, played on January 8 at the University of Phoenix Stadium in Glendale, Arizona. The top two teams based on the final BCS standings on December 3 – the Big Ten conference champion Ohio State University Buckeyes, was the top-ranked team in the final survey, and the SEC champion University of Florida Gators, was ranked number two. Florida settled the issue of who was the champion of NCAA Division I Bowl Subdivision football. Ohio State opened the game with a 93-yard TD return by Ted Ginn Jr., who injured his foot in the mass celebration following the play and did not return. Florida ultimately prevailed in the championship game, winning 41–14.

== Post-BCS All-Star Games ==
All-Star Game	Date	Location	Television	Result
Inta Juice North–South All-Star Classic	January 13, 2007	Galena Park ISD Stadium, Houston, Texas	ESPN2	North 28, South 17
Cornerstone Bancard Hula Bowl	January 14, 2007	Aloha Stadium, Honolulu	ESPN	Aina (East) 18, Kai (West) 10
Dell Computers East–West Shrine Game	January 20, 2007	Reliant Stadium, Houston, Texas	ESPN2	West 21, East 3
Under Armour Senior Bowl	January 27, 2007	Ladd–Peebles Stadium, Mobile, Alabama	NFL Network	North 27, South 0
Texas vs The Nation	February 2, 2007	Sun Bowl Stadium, University of Texas at El Paso, El Paso	CSTV	The Nation 24, Texas 20

Note: The Las Vegas All-American Classic, which was scheduled to be played on January 15 in Las Vegas, was canceled one week prior to its playing due to a lack of sponsorship.

== Conference standings ==
The list of conferences infra includes all conferences with at least one team having played in a bowl game, and is sorted first by winning percentage, then by total games won, and finally alphabetically, by conference name. The list also includes the teams from each conference that finished in the top 25 in the final AP Poll or the final Coaches poll for the 2006 season.

Final standings

Conference	Bowl Appearances					Final Poll Top 25			
Conference	#	Record	%	Winners	Losers	#	Teams	AP Rank	CP Rank
Big East†	5	5–0	1.000	Louisville; West Virginia; Rutgers; South Florida; Cincinnati		3	Louisville	#6	#7
Big East†	5	5–0	1.000	Louisville; West Virginia; Rutgers; South Florida; Cincinnati		3	West Virginia	#10	#10
Big East†	5	5–0	1.000	Louisville; West Virginia; Rutgers; South Florida; Cincinnati		3	Rutgers	#12	#12
Western Athletic	4	3–1	0.750	Boise State; Hawaii; San Jose State	Nevada	2	Boise State	#5	#6
Western Athletic	4	3–1	0.750	Boise State; Hawaii; San Jose State	Nevada	2	Hawaii	NR	#24
Mountain West	4	3–1	0.750	BYU; TCU; Utah	New Mexico	2	BYU	#16	#15
Mountain West	4	3–1	0.750	BYU; TCU; Utah	New Mexico	2	TCU	#22	#21
Southeastern	9	6–3	0.667	Florida; LSU; Auburn; Georgia; Kentucky; South Carolina	Arkansas; Tennessee; Alabama	6	Florida	#1	#1
Southeastern	9	6–3	0.667	Florida; LSU; Auburn; Georgia; Kentucky; South Carolina	Arkansas; Tennessee; Alabama	6	LSU	#3	#3
Southeastern	9	6–3	0.667	Florida; LSU; Auburn; Georgia; Kentucky; South Carolina	Arkansas; Tennessee; Alabama	6	Auburn	#9	#8
Southeastern	9	6–3	0.667	Florida; LSU; Auburn; Georgia; Kentucky; South Carolina	Arkansas; Tennessee; Alabama	6	Arkansas	#15	#16
Southeastern	9	6–3	0.667	Florida; LSU; Auburn; Georgia; Kentucky; South Carolina	Arkansas; Tennessee; Alabama	6	Georgia	#23	NR
Southeastern	9	6–3	0.667	Florida; LSU; Auburn; Georgia; Kentucky; South Carolina	Arkansas; Tennessee; Alabama	6	Tennessee	#25	#23
Atlantic Coast	8	4–4	0.500	Boston College; Florida State; Maryland; Miami	Wake Forest; Virginia Tech; Clemson; Georgia Tech	3	Wake Forest	#18	#17
Atlantic Coast	8	4–4	0.500	Boston College; Florida State; Maryland; Miami	Wake Forest; Virginia Tech; Clemson; Georgia Tech	3	Virginia Tech	#19	#18
Atlantic Coast	8	4–4	0.500	Boston College; Florida State; Maryland; Miami	Wake Forest; Virginia Tech; Clemson; Georgia Tech	3	Boston College	#20	#20
Pac-10	6	3–3	0.500	Southern California; California; Oregon State	Arizona State; Oregon; UCLA	3	Southern California	#4	#4
Pac-10	6	3–3	0.500	Southern California; California; Oregon State	Arizona State; Oregon; UCLA	3	California	#14	#14
Pac-10	6	3–3	0.500	Southern California; California; Oregon State	Arizona State; Oregon; UCLA	3	Oregon State	#21	#22
Sun Belt≠	2	1–1	0.500	Troy	Middle Tennessee	0	none		
Big 12	8	3–5	0.375	Texas; Oklahoma State; Texas Tech	Oklahoma; Kansas State; Missouri; Texas A&M; Nebraska	2	Oklahoma	#11	#13t
Big 12	8	3–5	0.375	Texas; Oklahoma State; Texas Tech	Oklahoma; Kansas State; Missouri; Texas A&M; Nebraska	2	Texas	#13	#13t
Big Ten	7	2–5	0.286	Wisconsin; Penn State	Ohio State; Michigan; Iowa; Minnesota; Purdue	4	Ohio State	#2	#2
Big Ten	7	2–5	0.286	Wisconsin; Penn State	Ohio State; Michigan; Iowa; Minnesota; Purdue	4	Wisconsin	#7	#5
Big Ten	7	2–5	0.286	Wisconsin; Penn State	Ohio State; Michigan; Iowa; Minnesota; Purdue	4	Michigan	#8	#9
Big Ten	7	2–5	0.286	Wisconsin; Penn State	Ohio State; Michigan; Iowa; Minnesota; Purdue	4	Penn State	#24	#25
Mid-American	4	1–3	0.250	Central Michigan	NIU; Ohio; Western Michigan	0	none		
Conference USA	5	1–4	0.200	Southern Miss	East Carolina; Houston; Rice; Tulsa	0	none		
Independents	2	0–2	0.000		Notre Dame; Navy	1	Notre Dame	#17	#19

KEY
† – Winner of the Bowl Challenge Cup.
≠ – Ineligible for the Bowl Challenge Cup as they only had two schools instead of the minimum three teams mandated.
AP – Final AP Poll for 2006 season.
CP – Final Coaches Poll for 2006 season.
t-tied for that position.
