= 2007 NCAA football bowl games =

In college football, 2007 NCAA football bowl games may refer to:

- 2006–07 NCAA football bowl games, for games played in January 2007 as part of the 2006 season.
- 2007–08 NCAA football bowl games, for games played in December 2007 as part of the 2007 season.
