= 2006 Motor City Bowl =

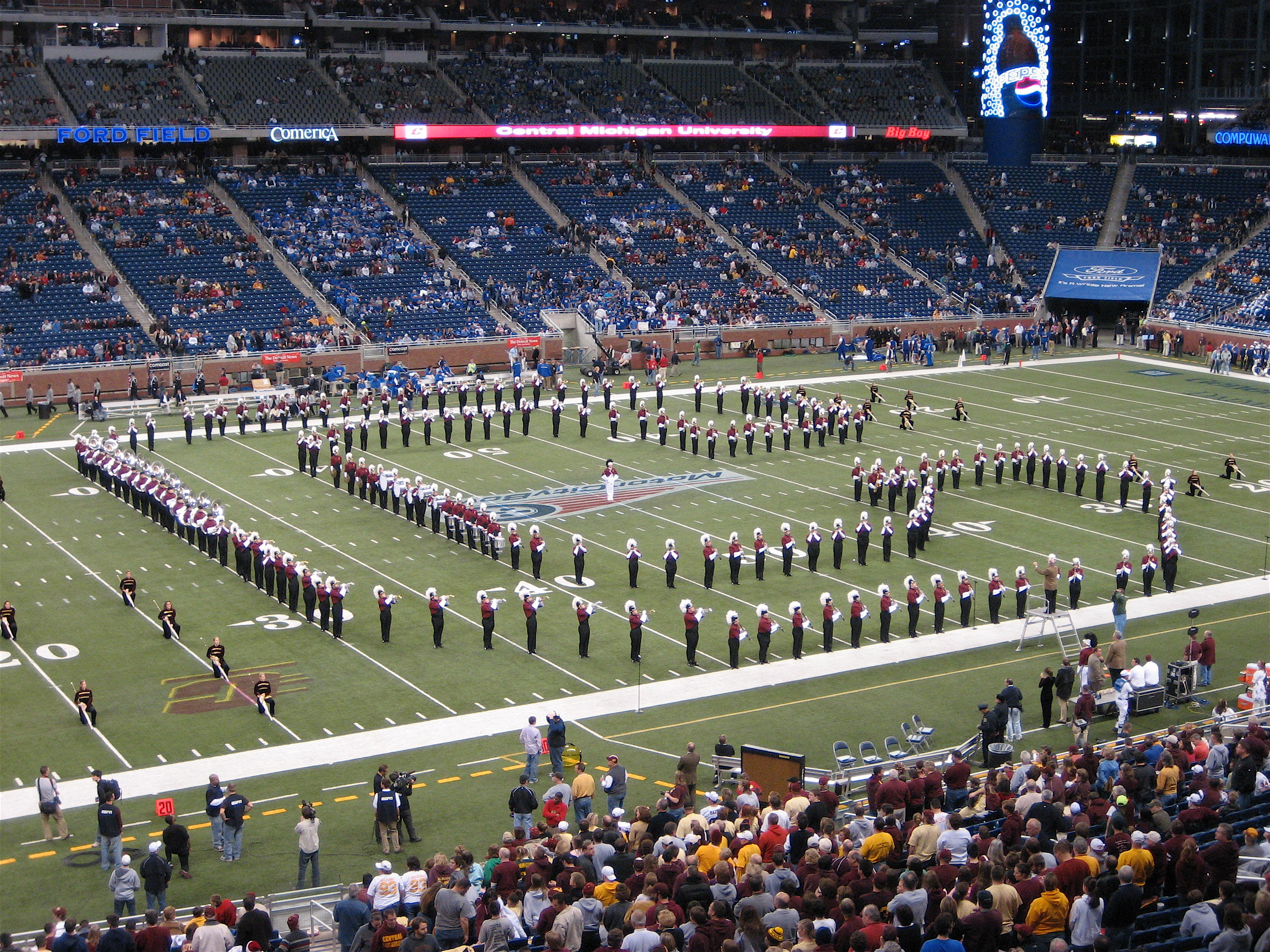
- The Central Michigan marching band performing at the game
Middle Tennessee Blue Raiders	Central Michigan Chippewas
(7–5)	(9–4)
Sun Belt	MAC
14	31
Head coach: Rick Stockstill	Head coach: Jeff Quinn (interim)
	1	2	3	4	Total
Middle Tennessee	0	7	0	7	14
Central Michigan	14	7	7	3	31
- Date: December 26, 2006
- Season: 2006
- Stadium: Ford Field
- Location: Detroit, Michigan
- Referee: Gerald Wright (Mtn. West)
- Attendance: 54,113

United States TV coverage
- Network: ESPN
- Announcers: Dave LaMont, Ray Bentley, Vince Welch

The 2006 Motor City Bowl, part of the 2006–07 NCAA football bowl games season, occurred on December 26, 2006, at Ford Field in Detroit, Michigan. The Central Michigan Chippewas beat the Middle Tennessee Blue Raiders 31–14. The Chippewas claimed their first bowl win in program history.

== Teams ==
=== Central Michigan University Chippewas ===
Central Michigan finished the regular season with an overall record of 8–4 and a 7–1 mark in conference play. While the Chippewas faced three Power Five teams, they dropped all three contests including a 17–41 loss at #10 Michigan. After finishing first in the MAC West division, they squared off against MAC East champion Ohio. Playing in Ford Field, Central Michigan won 31–10 to secure the MAC championship and a berth to the Motor City Bowl. This marked the first time since the bowl's inception in 1997 that an in-state team participated. This was also Central Michigan's third Division I-A bowl game having previously lost the 1994 Las Vegas Bowl and the 1990 California Raisin Bowl.

Shortly after securing the conference title, head coach Brian Kelly was announced as head coach of Cincinnati. He choose not to coach Central Michigan in the bowl game and offensive coordinator Jeff Quinn was named interim head coach.

=== Middle Tennessee State Blue Raiders ===
Middle Tennessee State compiled a 6–6 regular season record going 6–1 in Sun Belt Conference play. They squared off against four Power Five teams losing all including ranked opponents #17 Oklahoma and #8 Louisville.

Entering the final game of the regular season against Troy, Middle Tennessee State was undefeated in conference play while Troy had one loss. With just over two minutes remaining, Middle Tennessee lead Troy 20-7. However, Troy staged a dramatic comeback, scoring a touchdown, recovering an onside kick, and scoring again with just 15 seconds remaining. A final Hail Mary attempt by the Blue Raiders was unsuccessful, resulting in a 21–20 loss. As a result, Middle Tennessee State was forced to share the Sun Belt championship with Troy.
