= 2006 Buffalo Bulls football team =

American college football season

2006 Buffalo Bulls football
- Conference: Mid-American Conference
- East Division
- Record: 2–10 (1–7 MAC)
- Head coach: Turner Gill (1st season)
- Offensive coordinator: Gerald Carr (1st season)
- Captains: Jamey Richard; Steven King; Ramon Guzman; Kareem Byrom; Trevor Scott
- Home stadium: University at Buffalo Stadium

2006 Mid-American Conference football standings
	Conf.			Overall
Team	W		L	W		L
East Division
Ohio x	7	–	1	9	–	5
Kent State	5	–	3	6	–	6
Akron	3	–	5	5	–	7
Bowling Green	3	–	5	4	–	8
Miami (OH)	2	–	6	2	–	10
Buffalo	1	–	7	2	–	10
West Division
Central Michigan x$	7	–	1	10	–	4
Western Michigan	6	–	2	8	–	5
Northern Illinois	5	–	3	7	–	6
Ball State	5	–	3	5	–	7
Toledo	3	–	5	5	–	7
Eastern Michigan	1	–	7	1	–	11
Championship: Central Michigan 31, Ohio 10
$ – Conference champion; x – Division champion/co-champions

The 2006 Buffalo Bulls football team represented the University at Buffalo as a member of the Mid-American Conference (MAC) during the 2006 NCAA Division I FBS football season. Led by first-year head coach Turner Gill, the Bulls compiled an overall record of 2–10 with a mark of 1–7 in conference play, placing last out of six teams in the MAC's East Division. The team played home games at the University at Buffalo Stadium in Amherst, New York.

== Schedule ==
Date	Time	Opponent	Site	TV	Result	Attendance	Source
August 31	7:00 pm	Temple*	University at Buffalo Stadium; Buffalo, NY		W 9–3 ^{OT}	29,795	
September 9	3:00 pm	at Bowling Green	Doyt Perry Stadium; Bowling Green, OH		L 40–48 ^{3OT}	14,227	
September 16	7:30 pm	at Northern Illinois	Huskie Stadium; Dekalb, IL		L 13–31	21,117	
September 23	2:30 pm	at No. 2 Auburn*	Jordan–Hare Stadium; Auburn, AL		L 7–38	84,921	
October 7	1:00 pm	Ball State	University at Buffalo Stadium; Buffalo, NY		L 25–55	14,885	
October 15	1:00 pm	Miami (OH)	University at Buffalo Stadium; Buffalo, NY		L 31–38	13,699	
October 21	2:00 pm	at Ohio	Peden Stadium; Athens, OH		L 7–42	19,409	
October 28	1:00 pm	at No. 18 Boston College*	Alumni Stadium; Chestnut Hill, MA	ESPN360	L 0–41	14,682	
November 4	1:00 pm	Kent State	University at Buffalo Stadium; Buffalo, NY		W 41–14	11,764	
November 9	6:00 pm	at Akron	Rubber Bowl; Akron, OH	ESPNU	L 16–31	14,512	
November 18	12:00 pm	at No. 12 Wisconsin*	Camp Randall Stadium; Madison, WI	ESPNU	L 3–35	80,850	
November 24	1:00 pm	Central Michigan	University at Buffalo Stadium; Buffalo, NY		L 28–55	11,941	
*Non-conference game; Rankings from AP Poll released prior to the game; All times are in Eastern time

== Game summaries ==
=== Miami (OH) ===
	1	2	3	4	Total
RedHawks	0	14	7	17	38
Bulls	7	7	7	10	31

Due to Lake Storm Aphid, the game was postponed from Saturday to Sunday.

== Roster ==
2006 Buffalo Bulls football team roster
Players
Coaches
Offense

Pos.	#	Name	Class
WR	21	Ernest Jackson	So
OL	71	Jamey Richard	Jr
WR, QB	18	Naaman Roosevelt	Fr
RB, QB	19	James Starks	Fr
QB	16	Drew Willy	So

Defense

Pos.	#	Name	Class
LB	2	Ramon Guzman	Sr
DL	95	Ronald Hilaire	So
DB	30	Mike Newton	Fr
DE	89	Trevor Scott	Jr

Special teams

Pos.	#	Name	Class

Head coach

- Turner Gill

Coordinators/assistant coaches

Legend

- (C) Team captain
- (S) Suspended
- (I) Ineligible
- Injured
- Redshirt
