= Jeff Quinn =

American football player and coach (born 1962)

Biographical details
- Born: September 26, 1962 (age 64)

Playing career
- 1980–1983: Elmhurst
- Position: Lineman

Coaching career (HC unless noted)
- 1984–1986: DePauw (assistant)
- 1986–1988: Ohio Northern (OL)
- 1989–2003: Grand Valley State (OC/OL)
- 2004–2006: Central Michigan (OC/OL)
- 2006: Central Michigan (interim HC)
- 2006–2009: Cincinnati (OC/OL)
- 2009: Cincinnati (interim HC)
- 2010–2014: Buffalo
- 2015: Notre Dame (offensive analyst)
- 2016–2017: Notre Dame (assistant S&C)
- 2018–2021: Notre Dame (OL)

Head coaching record
- Overall: 21–37
- Bowls: 1–2

Jeffrey Quinn (born September 26, 1962) is an American football coach. He was formerly an assistant coach at the University of Notre Dame. Quinn served as the head football coach at the University at Buffalo from 2010 to 2014. He was the 24th head coach in University at Buffalo football history. He replaced Turner Gill who left for Kansas following the 2009 season. Quinn served as interim head coach at Central Michigan University in 2006 and at the University of Cincinnati in 2009, following the resignation of Brian Kelly in both instances.

== Playing career ==
Quinn graduated from Elmhurst College in 1984 with a bachelor's degree in education. At Elmhurst, he played both offensive line in football and wrestled as a heavyweight. He was named NCAA Division III All-American third team following his senior season. He also won two College Conference of Illinois and Wisconsin championships as a wrestler and was inducted into Elmhurst's Athletic Hall of Fame in 1993.

== Coaching career ==
Quinn has been a college football coach for 26 years, 21 of which have been as an assistant to Brian Kelly at Grand Valley State, Central Michigan, Cincinnati, and Notre Dame. Quinn coached at DePauw University, where he earned a master's degree in educational leadership, and Ohio Northern University before moving on to Grand Valley State. Quinn followed Kelly to Central Michigan, then followed him again to Cincinnati, where he served as the offensive coordinator and offensive line coach. Quinn was a finalist for the 2009 Broyles Award, an award given to college football's best assistant coach. He served as an interim head coach for the 2006 Motor City Bowl (which he coached for Central Michigan after Kelly left for the head coaching job at Cincinnati) and the 2010 Sugar Bowl (which he coached for Cincinnati after Kelly left for Notre Dame).

In December 2009, Quinn was tapped to replace Turner Gill for the University at Buffalo. After coaching Cincinnati to a loss in the Sugar Bowl Quinn officially began his duties as a head coach. Quinn led the Bulls to their second bowl game in the team's history, they lost the 2013 Famous Idaho Potato Bowl. After a mediocre start in the 2014 season Quinn was relieved of his duties. Hired by Brian Kelly in 2015, he was an assistant coach for the Notre Dame football team until 2021.

== Head coaching record ==
Year	Team	Overall	Conference	Standing	Bowl/playoffs	Coaches^{#}	AP^{°}
Central Michigan Chippewas (Mid-American Conference) (2006)
2006	Central Michigan	1–0			W Motor City		
Central Michigan:		1–0					
Cincinnati Bearcats (Big East Conference) (2009)
2009	Cincinnati	0–1			L Sugar^{†}	9	8
Cincinnati:		0–1					
Buffalo Bulls (Mid-American Conference) (2010–2014)
2010	Buffalo	2–10	1–7	T–5th (East)			
2011	Buffalo	3–9	2–6	6th (East)			
2012	Buffalo	4–8	3–5	T–4th (East)			
2013	Buffalo	8–5	6–2	2nd (East)	L Famous Idaho Potato		
2014	Buffalo	3–4	1–2	Fired			
Buffalo:		20–36	13–22				
Total:		21–37					
^{†}Indicates BCS bowl.; ^{#}Rankings from final Coaches Poll.; ^{°}Rankings from final AP Poll.
