= 2006 Akron Zips football team =

American college football season

2006 Akron Zips football
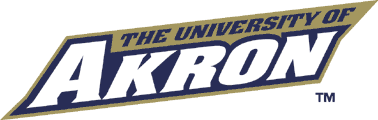
- Conference: Mid-American Conference
- East Division
- Record: 5–7 (3–5 MAC)
- Head coach: J. D. Brookhart (3rd season)
- Offensive coordinator: Joe Moorhead (1st season)
- Defensive coordinator: Jim Fleming (3rd season)
- Home stadium: Rubber Bowl

2006 Mid-American Conference football standings
	Conf.			Overall
Team	W		L	W		L
East Division
Ohio x	7	–	1	9	–	5
Kent State	5	–	3	6	–	6
Akron	3	–	5	5	–	7
Bowling Green	3	–	5	4	–	8
Miami (OH)	2	–	6	2	–	10
Buffalo	1	–	7	2	–	10
West Division
Central Michigan x$	7	–	1	10	–	4
Western Michigan	6	–	2	8	–	5
Northern Illinois	5	–	3	7	–	6
Ball State	5	–	3	5	–	7
Toledo	3	–	5	5	–	7
Eastern Michigan	1	–	7	1	–	11
Championship: Central Michigan 31, Ohio 10
$ – Conference champion; x – Division champion/co-champions

The 2006 Akron Zips football team represented the University of Akron in the 2006 NCAA Division I FBS football season. Akron competed as a member of the East Division of the Mid-American Conference (MAC). The Zips were led by J. D. Brookhart in his third year as head coach.

== Schedule ==
Date	Time	Opponent	Site	TV	Result	Attendance
September 2	3:30 p.m.	at No. 19 Penn State*	Beaver Stadium; State College, PA	ESPN2	L 16–34	106,505
September 9	12:00 p.m.	at NC State*	Carter–Finley Stadium; Raleigh, NC	ESPNU	W 20–17	56,103
September 16	1:00 p.m.	at Central Michigan	Kelly/Shorts Stadium; Mount Pleasant, MI	ESPN360	L 21–24	20,097
September 23	6:00 p.m.	North Texas*	Rubber Bowl; Akron, OH		W 33–13	16,011
September 30	2:00 p.m.	at Kent State	Dix Stadium; Kent, OH (Wagon Wheel)	ESPN Plus	L 15–37	22,013
October 7	3:30 p.m.	at Cincinnati*	Nippert Stadium; Cincinnati, OH	ESPN360	L 14–20	18,123
October 21	6:00 p.m.	Miami (OH)^{†}	Rubber Bowl; Akron, OH	ESPN360	W 24–13	17,721
October 28	7:00 p.m.	at Toledo	Glass Bowl; Toledo, OH	ESPN360	L 20–35	19,331
November 4	1:00 p.m.	Bowling Green	Rubber Bowl; Akron, OH		W 35–28	15,728
November 9	6:00 p.m.	Buffalo	Rubber Bowl; Akron, OH	ESPNU	W 31–16	14,512
November 16	7:30 p.m.	at Ohio	Peden Stadium; Athens, OH	ESPNU	L 7–17	15,631
November 24	3:30 p.m.	Western Michigan	Rubber Bowl; Akron, OH	ESPNU	L 0–17	16,686
*Non-conference game; ^{†}Homecoming; Rankings from AP Poll released prior to the game; All times are in Eastern time
