= 2006 Temple Owls football team =

American college football season

2006 Temple Owls football
- Conference: Independent
- Record: 1–11
- Head coach: Al Golden (1st season)
- Offensive coordinator: George DeLeone (1st season)
- Offensive scheme: Pro-style
- Defensive coordinator: Mark D'Onofrio (1st season)
- Base defense: 4–3
- Home stadium: Lincoln Financial Field

2006 NCAA Division I FBS independents football records
	Conf.			Overall
Team	W		L	W		L
No. 17 Notre Dame %		–		10	–	3
Navy		–		9	–	4
Army		–		3	–	9
Temple		–		1	–	11
% – BCS at-large representative; Rankings from AP Poll

The 2006 Temple Owls football team represented Temple University in the college 2006 NCAA Division I FBS football season. Temple competed as an independent. The team was coached by first-year head coach Al Golden and played their homes game in Lincoln Financial Field.

== Schedule ==
Date	Time	Opponent	Site	TV	Result	Attendance
August 31	7:00 pm	at Buffalo	University at Buffalo Stadium; Amherst, NY	CN8	L 3–9 ^{OT}	29,795
September 9	12:00 pm	No. 13 Louisville	Lincoln Financial Field; Philadelphia, PA		L 0–62	16,015
September 16	2:00 pm	at Minnesota	Hubert H. Humphrey Metrodome; Minneapolis, MN		L 0–62	45,612
September 23	7:00 pm	at Western Michigan	Waldo Stadium; Kalamazoo, MI		L 7–41	15,739
September 30	7:00 pm	at Vanderbilt	Vanderbilt Stadium; Nashville, TN		L 14–43	34,319
October 7	1:00 pm	Kent State	Lincoln Financial Field; Philadelphia, PA		L 17–28	13,704
October 12	7:30 pm	vs. No. 12 Clemson	Bank of America Stadium; Charlotte, NC	ESPNU	L 9–63	30,246
October 21	3:00 pm	at Northern Illinois	Huskie Stadium; DeKalb, PA	CSNC	L 21–43	27,039
October 28	1:00 pm	Bowling Green^{†}	Lincoln Financial Field; Philadelphia, PA		W 28–14	17,431
November 4	1:00 pm	Central Michigan	Lincoln Financial Field; Philadelphia, PA		L 26–42	16,091
November 11	3:30 pm	at Penn State	Beaver Stadium; University Park, PA	ESPN Plus	L 0–47	105,903
November 18	12:30 pm	at Navy	Navy–Marine Corps Memorial Stadium; Annapolis, MD	CSTV	L 6–42	33,927
^{†}Homecoming; Rankings from AP Poll released prior to the game; All times are in Eastern time
