= 2006 Ball State Cardinals football team =

American college football season

2006 Ball State Cardinals football
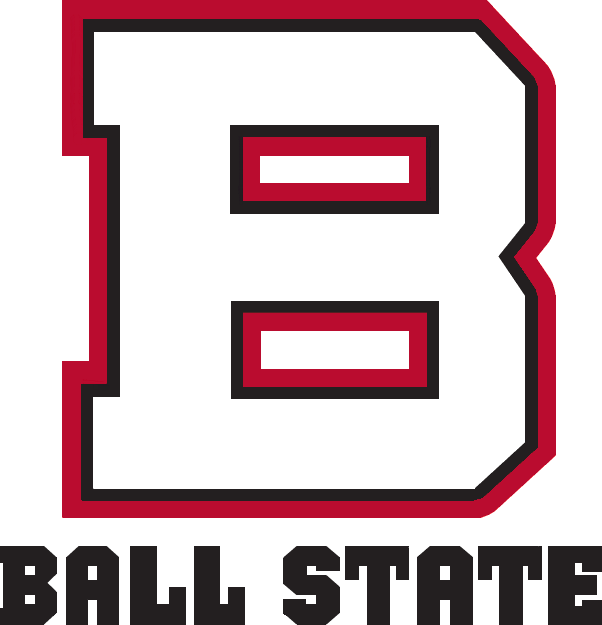
- Conference: Mid-American Conference
- West
- Record: 5–7 (5–3 MAC)
- Head coach: Brady Hoke (4th season)
- Offensive coordinator: Eddie Faulkner
- Defensive coordinator: Mark Smith
- Home stadium: Scheumann Stadium (Capacity: 21,581)

2006 Mid-American Conference football standings
	Conf.			Overall
Team	W		L	W		L
East Division
Ohio x	7	–	1	9	–	5
Kent State	5	–	3	6	–	6
Akron	3	–	5	5	–	7
Bowling Green	3	–	5	4	–	8
Miami (OH)	2	–	6	2	–	10
Buffalo	1	–	7	2	–	10
West Division
Central Michigan x$	7	–	1	10	–	4
Western Michigan	6	–	2	8	–	5
Northern Illinois	5	–	3	7	–	6
Ball State	5	–	3	5	–	7
Toledo	3	–	5	5	–	7
Eastern Michigan	1	–	7	1	–	11
Championship: Central Michigan 31, Ohio 10
$ – Conference champion; x – Division champion/co-champions

The 2006 Ball State Cardinals football team competed in football on behalf of the Ball State University during the 2006 NCAA Division I FBS football season. They were led by head coach Brady Hoke.

== Schedule ==
Date	Time	Opponent	Site	TV	Result	Attendance	Source
August 31	7:30 pm	Eastern Michigan	Scheumann Stadium; Muncie, IN	Comcast	W 38–20	12,326	
September 9	6:30 pm	Indiana*	Scheumann Stadium; Muncie, IN	Comcast	L 23–24	23,813	
September 16	1:00 pm	at Purdue*	Ross–Ade Stadium; West Lafayette, IN	ESPN360	L 28–38	51,561	
September 23	6:30 pm	No. 14 (FCS) North Dakota State*	Scheumann Stadium; Muncie, IN		L 24–29	10,285	
September 30	6:30 pm	Northern Illinois	Scheumann Stadium; Muncie, IN (rivalry)	CSNC	L 28–40	10,128	
October 7	1:00 pm	at Buffalo	University at Buffalo Stadium; Amherst, NY		W 55–25	14,885	
October 14	1:00 pm	at Central Michigan	Kelly/Shorts Stadium; Mount Pleasant, MI		L 7–18	21,013	
October 21	2:00 pm	Western Michigan^{†}	Scheumann Stadium; Muncie, IN	Comcast	L 27–41	17,626	
October 28	2:00 pm	at Miami (OH)	Yager Stadium; Oxford, OH	ONN	W 20–17	17,134	
November 4	12:00 pm	at No. 2 Michigan*	Michigan Stadium; Ann Arbor, MI	ESPNU	L 26–34	109,359	
November 14	7:00 pm	at Toledo	Glass Bowl; Toledo, OH	ESPN2	W 20–17	16,021	
November 24	12:00 pm	Kent State	Scheumann Stadium; Muncie, IN		W 30–6	16,189	
*Non-conference game; ^{†}Homecoming; Rankings from AP Poll released prior to the game; All times are in Eastern time
