= 2006 NCAA Division I FBS football season =

American college football season

2006 NCAA Division I FBS season
- Number of teams: 119
- Duration: August 31 – December 2
- Preseason AP No. 1: Ohio State

Postseason
- Duration: December 19, 2006 – January 8, 2007
- Bowl games: 32
- Heisman Trophy: Troy Smith (quarterback, Ohio State)

Bowl Championship Series
- 2007 BCS Championship Game
- Site: University of Phoenix Stadium, Glendale, Arizona
- Champion(s): Florida

NCAA Division I FBS football seasons
- ← 2005 2007 →

The 2006 NCAA Division I FBS football season was the highest level of college football competition in the United States organized by the National Collegiate Athletic Association (NCAA).

The regular season began on August 31, 2006, and ended on December 2, 2006. The postseason concluded on January 8, 2007, with the BCS National Championship Game in Glendale, Arizona, where the No. 2 Florida Gators defeated the No. 1 Ohio State Buckeyes by a score of 41–14 to win the national title.

The Boise State Broncos were the year's only undefeated team in both levels of Division I football after defeating Oklahoma in the Fiesta Bowl.

== Rules changes ==
The NCAA instituted the following rule changes for the 2006 season.

- The NCAA ruled that teams could schedule twelve regular-season games (up from eleven) beginning in the 2006 season. (NCAA teams in Alaska and Hawaii, and their home opponents, are allowed to schedule an extra game over and above this limit.)
- Instant replay is now officially sanctioned and standardized. All plays are reviewed by the replay officials as the play occurs. They may call down to the on-field officials to stop play if they need extra time to make a review. Each coach may also make one challenge per game. In the case of a coach's challenge, the coach must have at least one time-out remaining. If the challenge is upheld the coach gets the time-out back but the challenge is spent. If the challenge is rejected, both the challenge and the time-out are spent.
- Players may only wear clear eyeshields. Previously, both tinted and orange were also allowed.
- The kicking tee has been lowered from two inches tall to only one inch.
- Halftime lasts twenty minutes. Previously, it was only fifteen minutes, except for special ceremonies (i.e. homecoming).
- On a kickoff, the game clock starts when the ball is kicked rather than when the receiving team touches it.
  - This rule change has resulted in controversy, highlighted by the matchup between Wisconsin and Penn State on November 4, 2006, in which Wisconsin deliberately went off-sides on two consecutive kickoffs to run extra time off the clock at the close of the first half.
- On a change of possession, the clock starts when the referee marks the ball ready for play, instead of on the snap. This was the rule in the National Football League prior to 1973, and in high school football prior to 1996.
- The referee may no longer stop the game due to excessive crowd noise.
- When a live-ball penalty such as an illegal formation occurs on a kick, the receiving team may choose either to add the penalty yardage to the end of the return or require the kick to be attempted again with the spot moved back. Previously, only the latter option was available.
- If a team scores at the end of the game, they will not kick the extra point unless it would affect the outcome of the game.

== Regular season top 10 matchups ==
Rankings reflect the AP Poll. Rankings for Week 8 and beyond will list BCS Rankings first and AP Poll second. Teams that failed to be a top 10 team for one poll or the other will be noted.

- Week 2
  - No. 1 Ohio State defeated No. 2 Texas, 24–7 (Darrell K Royal–Texas Memorial Stadium, Austin, Texas)
- Week 3
  - No. 3 Auburn defeated No. 6 LSU, 7–3 (Jordan-Hare Stadium, Auburn, Alabama)
- Week 6
  - No. 5 Florida defeated No. 9 LSU, 23–10 (Ben Hill Griffin Stadium, Gainesville, Florida)
- Week 10
  - No. 5/5 Louisville defeated No. 3/3 West Virginia, 44–34 (Papa John's Cardinal Stadium, Louisville, Kentucky)
- Week 12
  - No. 1/1 Ohio State defeated No. 2/2 Michigan, 42–39 (Ohio Stadium, Columbus, Ohio)
- Week 13
  - No. 3/3 USC defeated No. 5/6 Notre Dame, 44–24 (Los Angeles Memorial Coliseum, Los Angeles, California)
  - No. 10/9 LSU defeated No. 6/5 Arkansas, 31–26 (War Memorial Stadium, Little Rock, Arkansas)
- Week 14
  - No. 4/4 Florida defeated No. 9/8 Arkansas, 38–28 (2006 SEC Championship Game, Georgia Dome, Atlanta, Georgia)

== Conference standings ==
2006 Atlantic Coast Conference football standings
	Conf.			Overall
Team	W		L	W		L
Atlantic Division
No. 18 Wake Forest x$	6	–	2	11	–	3
No. 20 Boston College	5	–	3	10	–	3
Maryland	5	–	3	9	–	4
Clemson	5	–	3	8	–	5
Florida State	3	–	5	7	–	6
NC State	2	–	6	3	–	9
Coastal Division
Georgia Tech x	7	–	1	9	–	5
No. 19 Virginia Tech	6	–	2	10	–	3
Virginia	4	–	4	5	–	7
Miami (FL)	3	–	5	7	–	6
North Carolina	2	–	6	3	–	9
Duke	0	–	8	0	–	12
Championship: Wake Forest 9, Georgia Tech 6
$ – BCS representative as conference champion; x – Division champion/co-champions; Rankings from AP Poll

2006 Big 12 Conference football standings
	Conf.			Overall
Team	W		L	W		L
North Division
Nebraska x	6	–	2	9	–	5
Missouri	4	–	4	8	–	5
Kansas State	4	–	4	7	–	6
Kansas	3	–	5	6	–	6
Colorado	2	–	6	2	–	10
Iowa State	1	–	7	4	–	8
South Division
No. 11 Oklahoma x$	7	–	1	11	–	3
No. 13 Texas	6	–	2	10	–	3
Texas A&M	5	–	3	9	–	4
Texas Tech	4	–	4	8	–	5
Oklahoma State	3	–	5	7	–	6
Baylor	3	–	5	4	–	8
Championship: Oklahoma 21, Nebraska 7
$ – BCS representative as conference champion; x – Division champion/co-champions; Rankings from AP Poll

2006 Big East Conference football standings
	Conf.			Overall
Team	W		L	W		L
No. 6 Louisville $	6	–	1	12	–	1
No. 10 West Virginia	5	–	2	11	–	2
No. 12 Rutgers	5	–	2	11	–	2
South Florida	4	–	3	9	–	4
Cincinnati	4	–	3	8	–	5
Pittsburgh	2	–	5	6	–	6
Connecticut	1	–	6	4	–	8
Syracuse	1	–	6	4	–	8
$ – BCS representative as conference champion; Rankings from AP Poll

2006 Big Ten Conference football standings
	Conf.			Overall
Team	W		L	W		L
No. 2 Ohio State $	8	–	0	12	–	1
No. 8 Michigan %	7	–	1	11	–	2
No. 7 Wisconsin	7	–	1	12	–	1
No. 24 Penn State	5	–	3	9	–	4
Purdue	5	–	3	8	–	6
Minnesota	3	–	5	6	–	7
Indiana	3	–	5	5	–	7
Northwestern	2	–	6	4	–	8
Iowa	2	–	6	6	–	7
Illinois	1	–	7	2	–	10
Michigan State	1	–	7	4	–	8
$ – BCS representative as conference champion; % – BCS at-large representative; Rankings from AP Poll

2006 Conference USA football standings
	Conf.			Overall
Team	W		L	W		L
East Division
Southern Miss x	6	–	2	9	–	5
East Carolina	5	–	3	7	–	6
Marshall	4	–	4	5	–	7
UCF	3	–	5	4	–	8
UAB	2	–	6	3	–	9
Memphis	1	–	7	2	–	10
West Division
Houston x$	7	–	1	10	–	4
Rice	6	–	2	7	–	6
Tulsa	5	–	3	8	–	5
SMU	4	–	4	6	–	6
UTEP	3	–	5	5	–	7
Tulane	2	–	6	4	–	8
Championship: Houston 34, Southern Miss 20
$ – Conference champion; x – Division champion/co-champions; Rankings from AP Poll

2006 Mid-American Conference football standings
	Conf.			Overall
Team	W		L	W		L
East Division
Ohio x	7	–	1	9	–	5
Kent State	5	–	3	6	–	6
Akron	3	–	5	5	–	7
Bowling Green	3	–	5	4	–	8
Miami (OH)	2	–	6	2	–	10
Buffalo	1	–	7	2	–	10
West Division
Central Michigan x$	7	–	1	10	–	4
Western Michigan	6	–	2	8	–	5
Northern Illinois	5	–	3	7	–	6
Ball State	5	–	3	5	–	7
Toledo	3	–	5	5	–	7
Eastern Michigan	1	–	7	1	–	11
Championship: Central Michigan 31, Ohio 10
$ – Conference champion; x – Division champion/co-champions

2006 Mountain West Conference football standings
	Conf.			Overall
Team	W		L	W		L
No. 16 BYU $	8	–	0	11	–	2
No. 22 TCU	6	–	2	11	–	2
Utah	5	–	3	8	–	5
Wyoming	5	–	3	6	–	6
New Mexico	4	–	4	6	–	7
Air Force	3	–	5	4	–	8
San Diego State	3	–	5	3	–	9
Colorado State	1	–	7	4	–	8
UNLV	1	–	7	2	–	10
$ – Conference champion; Rankings from AP Poll

2006 Pacific-10 Conference football standings
	Conf.			Overall
Team	W		L	W		L
No. 4 USC +	7	–	2	11	–	2
No. 14 California +	7	–	2	10	–	3
No. 21 Oregon State	6	–	3	10	–	4
UCLA	5	–	4	7	–	6
Arizona State	4	–	5	7	–	6
Oregon	4	–	5	7	–	6
Arizona	4	–	5	6	–	6
Washington State	4	–	5	6	–	6
Washington	3	–	6	5	–	7
Stanford	1	–	8	1	–	11
+ – Conference co-champions; Rankings from AP Poll

2006 Southeastern Conference football standings
	Conf.			Overall
Team	W		L	W		L
Eastern Division
No. 1 Florida x$#	7	–	1	13	–	1
No. 25 Tennessee	5	–	3	9	–	4
No. 23 Georgia	4	–	4	9	–	4
Kentucky	4	–	4	8	–	5
South Carolina	3	–	5	8	–	5
Vanderbilt	1	–	7	4	–	8
Western Division
No. 15 Arkansas x	7	–	1	10	–	4
No. 9 Auburn	6	–	2	11	–	2
No. 3 LSU %	6	–	2	11	–	2
Alabama	2	–	6	6	–	7
Ole Miss	2	–	6	4	–	8
Mississippi State	1	–	7	3	–	9
Championship: Florida 38, Arkansas 28
# – BCS National Champion; $ – BCS representative as conference champion; % – BCS at-large representative; x – Division champion/co-champions; Alabama had all victories vacated by the NCAA in 2010. As such, the official record for Alabama is 0–7 (0–6).; Rankings from AP Poll

2006 Sun Belt Conference football standings
	Conf.			Overall
Team	W		L	W		L
Troy +	6	–	1	8	–	5
Middle Tennessee +	6	–	1	7	–	6
Arkansas State	4	–	3	6	–	6
Florida Atlantic	4	–	3	5	–	7
Louisiana–Lafayette	3	–	4	6	–	6
Louisiana–Monroe	3	–	4	4	–	8
North Texas	2	–	5	3	–	9
FIU	0	–	7	0	–	12
+ – Conference co-champions

2006 Western Athletic Conference football standings
	Conf.			Overall
Team	W		L	W		L
No. 5 Boise State $	8	–	0	13	–	0
Hawaii	7	–	1	11	–	3
San Jose State	5	–	3	9	–	4
Nevada	5	–	3	8	–	5
Fresno State	4	–	4	4	–	8
Idaho	3	–	5	4	–	8
New Mexico State	2	–	6	4	–	8
Louisiana Tech	1	–	7	3	–	10
Utah State	1	–	7	1	–	11
$ – Conference champion and BCS representative as top non-AQ school to meet automatic qualification criteria; Rankings from AP Poll

2006 NCAA Division I FBS independents football records
	Conf.			Overall
Team	W		L	W		L
No. 17 Notre Dame %		–		10	–	3
Navy		–		9	–	4
Army		–		3	–	9
Temple		–		1	–	11
% – BCS at-large representative; Rankings from AP Poll

== FCS team wins over FBS teams ==
Italics denotes FCS teams.

Date	Visiting team	Home team	Site	Result	Attendance	Ref.
September 2	No. 22 (FCS) Montana State	Colorado	Folsom Field • Boulder, Colorado	19–10	45,513	
September 2	Portland State	New Mexico	University Stadium • Albuquerque, New Mexico	17–6	27,535	
September 2	No. 15 (FCS) Richmond	Duke	Wallace Wade Stadium • Durham, North Carolina	13–0	27,546	
September 9	No. 2 (FCS) New Hampshire	Northwestern	Ryan Field • Evanston, Illinois	34–17	20,108	
September 16	No. 16 (FCS) Southern Illinois	Indiana	Memorial Stadium • Bloomington, Indiana	35–28	31,156	
September 23	No. 14 (FCS) North Dakota State	Ball State	Scheumann Stadium • Muncie, Indiana	29–24	10,285	
October 28	No. 9 (FCS) Cal Poly	San Diego State	Qualcomm Stadium • San Diego, California	16–14	20,974	
^{#}Rankings from AP Poll released prior to game.

== Conference champions ==
=== Conference championship games ===
Rankings reflect the Week 14 AP Poll before the games were played.

Conference	Champion	Runner-up	Score	Site
ACC	No. 16 Wake Forest	No. 23 Georgia Tech	9–6	Alltel Stadium Jacksonville, Florida
Big 12	No. 8 Oklahoma	No. 19 Nebraska	21–7	Arrowhead Stadium Kansas City, Missouri
Conference USA	Houston	Southern Miss	34–20	Robertson Stadium Houston
MAC	Central Michigan	Ohio	31–10	Ford Field Detroit
SEC	No. 4 Florida	No. 8 Arkansas	38–28	Georgia Dome Atlanta

=== Other conference champions ===
Rankings are from the Week 15 AP Poll.

Conference	Winner(s)
Big East	No. 6 Louisville
Big Ten	No. 1 Ohio State
Mountain West	No. 19 BYU
Pac-10	No. 20 California, No. 8 USC*
Sun Belt	Middle Tennessee, Troy
WAC	No. 9 Boise State

* Received conference's automatic BCS bowl bid.

== BCS rankings progress ==
Ohio State was ranked No. 1 in all of the BCS-component polls (AP, Coaches', USA Today) in the preseason and the 14 polls taken in the regular season. When the BCS rankings began on October 15, Ohio State was No. 1 on all 8 rankings released during the season.

WEEK	No. 1	No. 2	EVENT
OCT 15	Ohio State	USC	Oregon State 33, USC 31
OCT 22	Ohio State	Michigan	Ohio St 44, Minnesota 0
OCT 29	Ohio State	Michigan	Ohio St 17, Illinois 10
NOV 5	Ohio State	Michigan	Ohio St 54, Northwestern 10
NOV 12	Ohio State	Michigan	Ohio St 42, Michigan 39
NOV 19	Ohio State	Michigan	Ohio St 42, Michigan 39
NOV 26	Ohio State	USC	UCLA 13, USC 9
DEC 3	Ohio State	Florida	Florida 38, Arkansas 28

== Bowl games ==
Winners are listed in boldface.

=== Bowl Championship Series ===
The Bowl Championship Series selected the No. 1 and No. 2 ranked teams to play for the national championship on January 8. The 2006 season marked a change for the BCS system, as the BCS National Championship Game became a standalone bowl game for the first time, to be played at the site of one of the four BCS bowls (the Fiesta, Orange, Sugar, and Rose Bowls) on a rotating basis. Under the previous format used from 1998 to 2006, the BCS National Championship coincided with one of the BCS bowls. The 2007 BCS Championship Game was played in Glendale, Arizona, the week after the Fiesta Bowl had been played there.

Rankings are from the Week 15 AP Poll.

Bowl game	Date	Playing as visitor	Playing as home	Score
BCS National Championship Game	January 8	**No. 2 Florida**	No. 1 Ohio State	**41** – 14
Sugar Bowl	January 3	No. 11 Notre Dame	**No. 4 LSU**	14 – **41**
Orange Bowl	January 2	**No. 5 Louisville**	No. 15 Wake Forest	**24** – 13
Fiesta Bowl	January 1	**No. 9 Boise State**	No. 7 Oklahoma	**43** – 42 (OT)
Rose Bowl	January 1	**No. 8 Southern California**	No. 3 Michigan	**32** – 18

=== January bowl games ===
Bowl game	Day	Playing as visitor	Playing as home	Score
GMAC Bowl	7th	Ohio	**Southern Mississippi**	7 – **28**
International Bowl	6th	Western Michigan	**Cincinnati**	24 – **27**
Cotton Bowl	1st	**No. 10 Auburn**	No. 22 Nebraska	**17** – 14
Capital One Bowl	1st	No. 12 Arkansas	**No. 6 Wisconsin**	14 – **17**
Gator Bowl	1st	Georgia Tech	**No. 13 West Virginia**	35 – **38**
Outback Bowl	1st	No. 17 Tennessee	**Penn State**	10 – **20**

=== December bowl games ===
Bowl game	Day	Playing as visitor	Playing as home	Score
MPC Computers Bowl	31st	**Miami**	Nevada	**21** – 20
Chick-fil-A Bowl	30th	**Georgia**	No. 14 Virginia Tech	**31** – 24
Alamo Bowl	30th	**No. 18 Texas**	Iowa	**26** – 24
Meineke Car Care Bowl	30th	Navy	**No. 23 Boston College**	24 – **25**
Champs Sports Bowl	29th	Purdue	**Maryland**	7 – **24**
Insight Bowl	29th	**Texas Tech**	Minnesota	**44** – 41
Liberty Bowl	29th	Houston	**South Carolina**	36 – **44**
Sun Bowl	29th	**No. 24 Oregon State**	Missouri	**39** – 38
Music City Bowl	29th	Clemson	**Kentucky**	20 – **28**
Holiday Bowl	28th	No. 21 Texas A&M	**No. 20 California**	10 – **45**
Texas Bowl	28th	**No. 16 Rutgers**	Kansas State	**37** – 10
Independence Bowl	28th	**Oklahoma State**	Alabama	**34** – 31
Emerald Bowl	27th	**Florida State**	UCLA	**44** – 27
Motor City Bowl	26th	Middle Tennessee	**Central Michigan**	14 – **31**
Hawaii Bowl	24th	Arizona State	**Hawaii**	24 – **41**
Armed Forces Bowl	23rd	Tulsa	**Utah**	13 – **25**
New Mexico Bowl	23rd	New Mexico	**San José State**	12 – **20**
PapaJohns.com Bowl	23rd	**South Florida**	East Carolina	**24** – 7
New Orleans Bowl	22nd	Rice	**Troy**	17 – **41**
Las Vegas Bowl	21st	**No. 19 BYU**	Oregon	**38** – 8
Poinsettia Bowl	19th	Northern Illinois	**No. 25 TCU**	7 – **37**

=== Bowl Challenge Cup standings ===
Conference	Wins	Losses	Pct.
**Big East Conference**	5	0	1.000
Mountain West Conference	3	1	.750
Western Athletic Conference	3	1	.750
Southeastern Conference	6	3	.667
Atlantic Coast Conference	4	4	.500
Pacific-10 Conference	3	3	.500
Sun Belt Conference	1	1	.500
Big 12 Conference	3	5	.375
Big Ten Conference	2	5	.286
Mid-American Conference	1	3	.250
Conference USA	1	4	.200
Independents	0	2	.000

== Awards and honors ==
=== Heisman Trophy voting ===
The Heisman Trophy is given to the year's most outstanding player

Player	School	Position	1st	2nd	3rd	Total
Troy Smith	Ohio State	QB	801	62	13	2,540
Darren McFadden	Arkansas	RB	45	298	147	878
Brady Quinn	Notre Dame	QB	13	276	191	782
Steve Slaton	West Virginia	RB	6	51	94	214
Mike Hart	Michigan	RB	5	58	79	210
Colt Brennan	Hawaii	QB	6	44	96	202
Ray Rice	Rutgers	RB	1	16	44	79
Ian Johnson	Boise State	RB	1	13	44	73
Dwayne Jarrett	USC	WR	1	11	22	47
Calvin Johnson	Georgia Tech	WR	1	8	24	43

=== Other major award winners ===
- Walter Camp Award (top player): Troy Smith, Ohio State
- Maxwell Award (top player): Brady Quinn, Notre Dame
- Associated Press College Football Player of the Year Award: Troy Smith, Ohio State
- Bronko Nagurski Trophy (defensive player): James Laurinaitis, Ohio State
- Chuck Bednarik Award (defensive player): Paul Posluszny, Penn State
- Dave Rimington Trophy (center): Dan Mozes, West Virginia
- Davey O'Brien Award (quarterback): Troy Smith, Ohio State
- Dick Butkus Award (linebacker): Patrick Willis, Ole Miss
- Doak Walker Award (running back): Darren McFadden, Arkansas
- Draddy Trophy ("academic Heisman"): Brian Leonard, Rutgers
- Fred Biletnikoff Award (wide receiver): Calvin Johnson, Georgia Tech
- Jim Thorpe Award (defensive back): Aaron Ross, Texas
- John Mackey Award (tight end): Matt Spaeth, Minnesota
- Johnny Unitas Award (Sr. quarterback): Brady Quinn, Notre Dame
- Lombardi Award (top lineman): LaMarr Woodley, Michigan
- Lott Trophy (defensive impact): Dante Hughes, California
- Lou Groza Award (placekicker): Art Carmody, Louisville
- Manning Award (quarterback): JaMarcus Russell, LSU
- Mosi Tatupu Award (special teams): A. J. Trapasso, Ohio State
- Outland Trophy (interior lineman): Joe Thomas, Wisconsin
- Ray Guy Award (punter): Daniel Sepulveda, Baylor
- Ted Hendricks Award (defensive end): LaMarr Woodley, Michigan
- The Home Depot Coach of the Year Award: Greg Schiano, Rutgers
- Associated Press Coach of the Year: Jim Grobe, Wake Forest
- Paul "Bear" Bryant Award (head coach): Chris Petersen, Boise State
- Walter Camp Coach of the Year (head coach): Greg Schiano, Rutgers
- Broyles Award (assistant coach): Bud Foster, Virginia Tech

== Postseason coaching changes ==
Team	Former coach	Interim	New coach
Air Force	Fisher DeBerry		Troy Calhoun
Alabama	Mike Shula	Joe Kines	Nick Saban
Army	Bobby Ross		Stan Brock
Arizona State	Dirk Koetter		Dennis Erickson
Boston College	Tom O'Brien	Frank Spaziani	Jeff Jagodzinski
Central Michigan	Brian Kelly	Jeff Quinn	Butch Jones
Cincinnati	Mark Dantonio		Brian Kelly
Florida International	Don Strock		Mario Cristobal
Idaho	Dennis Erickson		Robb Akey
Iowa State	Dan McCarney		Gene Chizik
Louisiana Tech	Jack Bicknell III		Derek Dooley
Louisville	Bobby Petrino		Steve Kragthorpe
Miami (FL)	Larry Coker		Randy Shannon
Michigan State	John L. Smith		Mark Dantonio
Minnesota	Glen Mason		Tim Brewster
North Carolina	John Bunting		Butch Davis
NC State	Chuck Amato		Tom O'Brien
North Texas	Darrell Dickey		Todd Dodge
Rice	Todd Graham		David Bailiff
Stanford	Walt Harris		Jim Harbaugh
Tulane	Chris Scelfo		Bob Toledo
Tulsa	Steve Kragthorpe		Todd Graham
UAB	Watson Brown		Neil Callaway

== Attendances ==
#	Team	G	Total	Average
1	Michigan	7	770,183	110,026
2	Penn State	7	752,972	107,567
3	Tennessee	7	740,521	105,789
4	Ohio State	7	735,674	105,096
5	Georgia	7	649,222	92,746
6	LSU	8	737,696	92,212
7	Alabama	8	737,104	92,138
8	Southern California	6	548,880	91,480
9	Florida	7	632,866	90,409
10	Texas	7	619,534	88,505
11	Auburn	8	680,506	85,063
12	Nebraska	7	595,309	85,044
13	Oklahoma	6	507,366	84,561
14	Clemson	7	580,942	82,992
15	Wisconsin	7	569,576	81,368
16	Notre Dame	7	565,565	80,795
17	Florida State	8	644,256	80,532
18	Texas A&M	7	531,894	75,985
19	South Carolina	7	529,412	75,630
20	Arkansas	6	443,368	73,895
21	Michigan State	7	495,731	70,819
22	Iowa	7	494,095	70,585
23	Virginia Tech	8	529,864	66,233
24	UCLA	7	454,683	64,955
25	California	7	450,223	64,318
26	BYU	6	363,146	60,524
27	West Virginia	7	411,408	58,773
28	Oregon	6	350,267	58,378
29	Virginia	6	346,389	57,732
30	Washington	6	344,897	57,483
31	Kentucky	7	401,307	57,330
32	NC State	7	395,779	56,540
33	Missouri	7	391,424	55,918
34	Arizona	7	390,589	55,798
35	Purdue	7	388,198	55,457
36	Arizona State	6	327,369	54,562
37	Mississippi	7	376,604	53,801
38	Minnesota	6	313,239	52,207
39	Texas Tech	6	305,243	50,874
40	Georgia Tech	7	354,321	50,617
41	Maryland	7	345,752	49,393
42	North Carolina	7	342,000	48,857
43	Kansas State	8	373,547	46,693
44	Iowa State	7	323,197	46,171
45	Colorado	6	276,286	46,048
46	Kansas	7	308,961	44,137
47	Illinois	7	304,118	43,445
48	Pittsburgh	7	303,138	43,305
49	Utah	6	259,675	43,279
50	UTEP	6	254,662	42,444
51	Miami Hurricanes	7	293,359	41,908
52	Stanford	5	208,710	41,742
53	Mississippi State	7	290,688	41,527
54	Louisville	6	248,891	41,482
55	Rutgers	6	246,675	41,113
56	Oklahoma State	6	245,726	40,954
57	Oregon State	7	285,808	40,830
58	Connecticut	7	272,576	38,939
59	Boston College	7	271,903	38,843
60	Fresno State	6	231,307	38,551
61	Air Force	6	228,206	38,034
62	Syracuse	6	223,577	37,263
63	East Carolina	6	223,006	37,168
64	Baylor	7	259,559	37,080
65	Hawaii	8	292,708	36,589
66	Vanderbilt	6	209,168	34,861
67	Washington State	7	242,698	34,671
68	Navy	5	166,375	33,275
69	Indiana	7	231,443	33,063
70	Wake Forest	6	195,091	32,515
71	Memphis	7	227,077	32,440
72	TCU	6	191,557	31,926
73	UCF	7	220,980	31,569
74	Army	5	153,469	30,694
75	Boise State	6	182,718	30,453
76	South Florida	6	181,333	30,222
77	San Diego State	6	175,364	29,227
78	Southern Miss	6	173,963	28,994
79	New Mexico	7	200,431	28,633
80	Northwestern	6	167,973	27,996
81	Marshall	5	130,155	26,031
82	Colorado State	5	120,916	24,183
83	UAB	6	138,835	23,139
84	Middle Tennessee State	5	110,185	22,037
85	Houston	8	175,277	21,910
86	Central Michigan	5	107,817	21,563
87	Tulsa	6	128,186	21,364
88	Troy	5	104,048	20,810
89	Northern Illinois	6	124,623	20,771
90	Cincinnati	7	142,613	20,373
91	Toledo	6	121,863	20,311
92	Duke	7	137,061	19,580
93	UNLV	6	115,442	19,240
94	Wyoming	6	114,653	19,109
95	Arkansas State	5	95,344	19,069
96	Tulane	5	94,710	18,942
97	San Jose State	7	131,978	18,854
98	Western Michigan	5	93,124	18,625
99	Louisiana–Monroe	5	111,564	18,594
100	New Mexico State	7	123,172	17,596
101	Kent State	5	85,018	17,004
102	Bowling Green	4	67,335	16,834
103	Nevada	6	100,367	16,728
104	Ohio	5	83,622	16,724
105	Buffalo	5	82,084	16,417
106	Akron	5	80,658	16,132
107	Temple	4	63,241	15,810
108	North Texas	5	78,249	15,650
109	SMU	6	92,565	15,428
110	Miami RedHawks	5	76,219	15,244
111	Florida International	5	75,552	15,110
112	Ball State	6	90,367	15,061
113	Rice	4	59,041	14,760
114	Eastern Michigan	4	58,934	14,734
115	Louisiana Tech	5	72,928	14,586
116	Idaho	5	72,717	14,543
117	Louisiana–Lafayette	6	87,096	14,516
118	Utah State	5	56,800	11,360
119	Florida Atlantic	5	46,382	9,276

== See also ==
- FIU–Miami football brawl
