= 2006 Bowling Green Falcons football team =

American college football season

2006 Bowling Green Falcons football
- Conference: Mid-American Conference
- East
- Record: 4–8 (3–5 MAC)
- Head coach: Gregg Brandon (4th season)
- Offensive coordinator: Greg Studrawa (4th as OC, 6th overall season)
- Defensive coordinator: John Lovett (2nd season)
- Home stadium: Doyt Perry Stadium

2006 Mid-American Conference football standings
	Conf.			Overall
Team	W		L	W		L
East Division
Ohio x	7	–	1	9	–	5
Kent State	5	–	3	6	–	6
Akron	3	–	5	5	–	7
Bowling Green	3	–	5	4	–	8
Miami (OH)	2	–	6	2	–	10
Buffalo	1	–	7	2	–	10
West Division
Central Michigan x$	7	–	1	10	–	4
Western Michigan	6	–	2	8	–	5
Northern Illinois	5	–	3	7	–	6
Ball State	5	–	3	5	–	7
Toledo	3	–	5	5	–	7
Eastern Michigan	1	–	7	1	–	11
Championship: Central Michigan 31, Ohio 10
$ – Conference champion; x – Division champion/co-champions

The 2006 Bowling Green Falcons football team represented Bowling Green State University in the 2006 NCAA Division I FBS football season. The team was coached by Gregg Brandon and played their home games in Doyt Perry Stadium in Bowling Green, Ohio. It was the 88th season of play for the Falcons.

== Schedule ==
Date	Time	Opponent	Site	TV	Result	Attendance	Source
September 2	7:00 pm	vs. Wisconsin*	Cleveland Browns Stadium; Cleveland, OH	ESPN+	L 14–35	30,307	
September 9	3:00 pm	Buffalo	Doyt Perry Stadium; Bowling Green, OH	BCSN	W 48–40 ^{3OT}	14,227	
September 16	6:00 pm	at FIU*	FIU Stadium; Miami, FL		W 33–28	15,212	
September 23	1:00 pm	Kent State	Doyt Perry Stadium; Bowling Green, OH (Battle for the Anniversary Award)	BCSN	L 3–38	12,967	
September 30	2:00 pm	at Ohio	Peden Stadium; Athens, OH		W 21–9	18,546	
October 7	3:30 pm	at No. 1 Ohio State*	Ohio Stadium; Columbus, OH	ESPN+	L 7–35	105,057	
October 14	4:00 pm	Eastern Michigan^{†}	Doyt Perry Stadium; Bowling Green, OH	BCSN	W 24–21	14,525	
October 19	7:30 pm	at Central Michigan	Kelly/Shorts Stadium; Mount Pleasant, MI	ESPNU	L 14–31	11,262	
October 28	1:00 pm	at Temple	Lincoln Financial Field; Philadelphia, PA		L 14–28	17,431	
November 4	1:00 pm	at Akron	Rubber Bowl; Akron, OH		L 28–35	15,728	
November 15	7:30 pm	Miami (OH)	Doyt Perry Stadium; Bowling Green, OH	ESPN2	L 7–9	25,616	
November 21	7:00 pm	at Toledo	Glass Bowl; Toledo, OH (Peace Pipe Trophy)	ESPN2	L 21–31	23,917	
*Non-conference game; ^{†}Homecoming; Rankings from AP Poll released prior to the game; All times are in Eastern time

== Roster ==
2006 Bowling Green Falcons football team roster
Players
Coaches
Offense

Pos.	#	Name	Class
QB, WR	7	Freddie Barnes	Fr
OC	78	Kory Lichtensteiger	Jr
QB	13	Tyler Sheehan	Fr

Defense

Pos.	#	Name	Class
DL	99	Diyral Briggs	So
DL	87	D. J. Young	Fr

Special teams

Pos.	#	Name	Class

Head coach

- Gregg Brandon

Coordinators/assistant coaches

Legend

- (C) Team captain
- (S) Suspended
- (I) Ineligible
- Injured
- Redshirt
