= 2006 Miami RedHawks football team =

American college football season

2006 Miami RedHawks football
- Conference: Mid-American Conference
- East Division
- Record: 2–10 (2–6 MAC)
- Head coach: Shane Montgomery (2nd season)
- Offensive scheme: Multiple
- Defensive coordinator: Taver Johnson (2nd season)
- Base defense: 4–3
- Home stadium: Yager Stadium

2006 Mid-American Conference football standings
	Conf.			Overall
Team	W		L	W		L
East Division
Ohio x	7	–	1	9	–	5
Kent State	5	–	3	6	–	6
Akron	3	–	5	5	–	7
Bowling Green	3	–	5	4	–	8
Miami (OH)	2	–	6	2	–	10
Buffalo	1	–	7	2	–	10
West Division
Central Michigan x$	7	–	1	10	–	4
Western Michigan	6	–	2	8	–	5
Northern Illinois	5	–	3	7	–	6
Ball State	5	–	3	5	–	7
Toledo	3	–	5	5	–	7
Eastern Michigan	1	–	7	1	–	11
Championship: Central Michigan 31, Ohio 10
$ – Conference champion; x – Division champion/co-champions

The 2006 Miami RedHawks football team represented Miami University in the 2006 NCAA Division I FBS football season The team was coached by Shane Montgomery and played their homes game in Yager Stadium in Oxford, Ohio.

== Preseason ==
The RedHawks had to fill several holes in the starting line up, due to the Graduation of 19 seniors, including eight all-MAC selections. Included among the losses were five offensive starters, nine defensive starters and the starting place kicker. The Hardest hit position was linebacker which graduated five of the top six players including Terna Nande. With the graduation of Josh Betts, head coach Shane Montgomery also had to pick a starting Quarterback from the returning Junior Mike Kokal, sophomore Jared Elliott and handful of redshirt freshman recruits, totaling seven possible options.

Senior wide receiver punt returner Ryne Robinson had the opportunity to set on at least two NCAA career records. "Robinson, the nation's active leader in career punt return yardage has totaled 1,502 career punt yards and is closing on the career record of 1,761 yards established by Texas Tech's Wes Welker. Robinson also was the nation's active leader in career punt return touchdowns with six and has closed to within two of that NCAA record.

== Schedule ==
Date	Time	Opponent	Site	TV	Result	Attendance
August 31	7:30 pm	Northwestern*	Yager Stadium; Oxford, OH	ESPNU	L 3–21	20,476
September 9	1:00 pm	at Purdue*	Ross–Ade Stadium; West Lafayette, IN	ESPN360	L 31–38 ^{OT}	53,668
September 16	2:00 pm	Kent State	Yager Stadium; Oxford, OH	ESPN Plus	L 14–16	10,486
September 23	7:00 pm	at Syracuse*	Carrier Dome; Syracuse, NY	ESPNU	L 14–34	35,274
September 30	3:30 pm	at Cincinnati*	Nippert Stadium; Cincinnati, OH (Victory Bell)		L 10–24	21,248
October 8	8:00 pm	Northern Illinois^{†}	Yager Stadium; Oxford, OH	ESPN	L 25–28	12,197
October 15	1:00 pm	at Buffalo	University at Buffalo Stadium; Amherst, NY		W 38–31	13,699
October 21	6:00 pm	at Akron	Rubber Bowl; Akron, OH	ESPN360	L 13–24	17,721
October 28	2:00 pm	Ball State	Yager Stadium; Oxford, OH	ONN	L 17–20	17,134
November 4	3:30 pm	at Western Michigan	Waldo Stadium; Kalamazoo, MI		L 24–27	12,822
November 15	7:30 pm	at Bowling Green	Doyt Perry Stadium; Bowling Green, OH	ESPN2	W 9–7	25,616
November 24	12:00 pm	Ohio	Yager Stadium; Oxford, OH (Battle of the Bricks)	ESPNU	L 24–34	15,926
*Non-conference game; ^{†}Homecoming; All times are in Eastern time

== Roster ==
(as of 08/31/2006)
Wide receivers: 11 Busing, Ryan – SR; 82 Corbin, R.J. – SR; 2 Harris II, Eugene – FR; 23 LaMonica, Pat – SO; 18 McVay, Sean– SO; 9 Morton-Green, E.J.- RS FR; 81 O'Bryan, Patrick – JR; 86 Potter, Donovan – FR; 11 Robinson, Armand – FR; 2 Robinson, Ryne – SR; 4 Williams, Josh – SR; 88 Woods, Dustin – RS FR; Offensive line: 63 Armagno, Mike – FR; 79 Buckman, John – JR; 71 Cartwright, Heath – RS; 57 Compton, Craig – JR; 68 DiFranco, Dave – SO; 75 Gulley, Rob – FR; 53 Kosky, Steve – SR; 61 Lovas, Kyle – SO; 78 Marshall, Zachary S.- SO; 50 McKeown, Matt – SO; 72 Meister, Steve – JR; 76 Norden, Charlie – JR; 55 Sutter, Steve 6–6 – SO; 73 Walters, Peter – JR; 70 Williams, Nate – FR; Tight ends: 80 Crabtree, Tom – SO; 89 Hohl, Mike – RS FR; 83 O'Connell, Jake – SO; 84 Redwine, Sean – FR; 87 Shepard, Pat – SO; Fullbacks: 39 DeBartolo, Nick – SO; 47 Mahon, Nathan – RS FR; 49 Vogele, Matt – SR	Quarterbacks: 17 Decker, Kyle – SO; 14 Elliott, Jared – SO; 3 Kokal, Mike – JR; 15 Miller, Brent – RS FR; 8 Mustard, Craig – SO; 10 Rockey, Blake – RS FR; 12 Raudabaugh, Daniel - RS FR; Running backs: 25 Bowen, Paul – FR; 22 Bratton, Andre – RS FR; 43 Calhoun, Jimmy – SO; 31 Jones, Cory – SO; 16 Miller, Jamel – FR; 24 Murphy, Brandon – JR; 25 Murray, Jimmy – SR; 29 Sykes, Austin – JR; Defensive line: 96 Case, James – SO; 93 Channels, Martin – FR; 56 Collins, Kyle – FR; 51 Coniglio, Joe – RS SO; 99 Craven, Travis – RS FR; 94 Huddle, Ben – SO; 69 Linwood III, Otto – JR; 58 Mester, Craig – JR; 92 Painter, Seth – JR; 98 Paun, Mark – FR; 91 Sammy, Kevin – RS FR; 52 Satterthwait, Josh – SO; 90 Sills, Tranaine – JR; 21 Stevens, Jordan – FR; 65 Stewart, Alex – FR; 95 Svabik, D.J. – FR	Linebackers: 44 Bostic, Caleb – FR; 36 Britt, David – RS FR; 54 Cleveland, Jeff – FR; 45 Goatley, Brad – SO; 32 Hardy, Donnie – FR; 48 Hudson, Joey – SO; 47 Korto, Dexter – FR; 49 Mann, Mickey – SO; 9 Mullins, Clayton – SO; 46 Robinson, Rion – RS FR; 20 Shula, Chris – SO; 37 Wright, Dontae – SR; Defensive backs: 23 Bennett, Ben – FR; 18 Barranada, Mark – FR; 26 Brunson, Wendell – RS FR; 1 Card, Joey – SR; 8 Coombs, Braiden – RS FR; 28 Edwards, Peris – FR; 13 Gafford, Jordan – FR; 33 Gaines, Jerrid – JR; 15 Gibson, Jason – RS FR; 17 Kavanagh, Sean – SO; 34 Nande, Tersee – JR; 18 Palascak, Brian – JR; 16 Roland, Bryan – SO; 3 Thompson, Jeff – RS; 6 Wilson, Robbie – SO; 5 Wiwo, Frank – SR; Punters: 95 DiCesare, Chris – RS FR; 4 Richardson, Jacob – SO; Kickers: 97 Cady, Kevin – RS FR; 19 Cook, Trevor – FR; 35 Parseghian, – SO; Deep Snapper: 60 Collins, Chase – RS FR; 59 McClain, Dave – SR; 62 Rummler, Mike – FR

== Coaching staff ==
Name	Position	Years	Alma mater (Year)
Shane Montgomery	Head coach	1	North Carolina State (1990)
Taver Johnson	Assistant head coach Defensive coordinator	2	Wittenberg University (1989)
DeAndre Smith	Running coordinator Running backs	0	Southwest Missouri State University (1987)
Brian Von Bergen	Passing coordinator Wide receivers	7	University of Illinois (1992)
Rusty Wright	Special teams coordinator	1	University of Tennessee at Chattanooga (1996)
Craig Aukerman	Linebackers	1	University of Findlay (1999)
Mike Bath	Tight ends	0	Miami University (2001)
Tim Cooper	Defensive backs	2	DePauw University (1997)
Matt Hohman	Offensive line	1	Miami University (1995)
Jay Hood	Defensive line	1	Ohio Wesleyan University (1986)

== Game summaries ==
=== Northwestern ===
	1	2	3	4	Total
Wildcats	0	0	14	7	21
RedHawks	0	0	3	0	3

This was an emotional evening as Miami honored the former head coach of both schools Randy Walker, who died unexpectedly earlier this summer. The 52-year-old Northwestern coach died on June 29, 2006 of an apparent heart attack. He was replaced at Northwestern by Pat Fitzgerald, who was Walker's top assistant. Walker also was a Miami graduate, and had more wins than any other head coach in Miami history. The game was a defensive battle with Northwestern gaining 301 total yards to Miami's 230 yards. After a scoreless first half, the Wildcats’ Erryn Cobb blocked a punt and returned it for a touchdown early in the third period to begin a 21-point second half for the Wildcats. Miami answered the Wildcats first score with a 22-yard field goal midway through the third quarter by Nathan Parseghian, The Wildcats offense then scored again when redshirt quarterback Mike Kafka threw a 19-yard touchdown pass to Tyrell Sutton. Terrell Jordan finished off the scoring with a 4-yard touchdown run early in the fourth quarter make it 21–3.

=== Purdue ===
	1	2	3	4	OT	Total
RedHawks	0	3	14	14	0	31
Boilermakers	0	10	7	14	7	38

Purdue beat Miami by a score of 38–31 when the RedHawks failed score a touchdown in overtime after the Boilermaker's Kory Sheets scored the game-winning touchdowns in their overtime possession. Miami missed pulling the upset when the Boilermaker's Anthony Spencer blocked Nathan Parseghian's potential game-winning field goal attempt with 17 seconds left forcing the overtime. The RedHawks moved the ball well in the first half but failed to score a touchdown. The first half ended with Purdue leading 10–3. The RedHawks finally crossed the goal line in the 3rd quarter for their first touch down of the season, when Mike Kokal hit Jake O'Connell 2-yard touchdown pass to tie the game at 10. The RedHawks and Boilermakers traded touchdowns the rest of the game to finish regulation tied at 31. The RedHawks offence was led by Mike Kokal who passed for 378 yards and four touchdowns, and Ryne Robinson who caught nine passes for 162 yards and two touchdowns.

=== Kent State ===
	1	2	3	4	Total
Golden Flashes	6	3	7	0	16
RedHawks	0	0	8	6	14

For the third straight game the RedHawks did not cross the goal line in the first half. Kent State took a half time lead of 9–0. On Kent's first drive in the third quarter, Julian Edelman ran for a 1-yard touchdown to make the score 16–0. Brandon Murphy scored for the RedHawks on a 3-yard run with 2:46 remaining in the third quarter. The RedHawks came close to forcing an overtime when Mike Kokal ran for a 2-yard TD with 1:04 remaining but Kokal's pass attempt on the 2-point conversion to tie fell incomplete. The Golden Flashes broke an 11-game losing streak with the victory Saturday.

=== Syracuse ===
	1	2	3	4	Total
RedHawks	0	7	0	7	14
Orange	14	0	3	17	34

The Orange's Curtis Brinkley ran for 108 yards on 15 carries including one Touchdown to lead Syracuse to a 34–14 victory over the Redhawks. Miami was led by Mike Kokal who completed 17-of-28 passes for 171 yards and a touchdown. He also added 24 yards rushing but he was also sacked 7 times and only got off only three second-half pass attempts. Entering the game the RedHawk offensive line had given up a nationally worst number of sacks with 22. The line problems were compounded by injuries of starting left tackle Charlie Norden and right guard Matt McKeown.

=== Cincinnati ===
	1	2	3	4	Total
RedHawks	3	0	7	0	10
Bearcats	14	3	0	7	24

After a first quarter fumble, Trevor Cook kicked a 49-yard field goal to give the RedHawks their first lead this season. Bearcats’ offence responded by scoring 17 unanswered points to take a 17–3 lead. The RedHawks’ office led by redshirt freshman Daniel Raudabaugh, starting in place of the injured Mike Kokal, did not score the rest of the game. The RedHawks did have a Miami's Ryne Robinson returned a punt 80 yards for a touchdown midway through the third quarter. This was Robinson seventh career punt return touchdown. The record of 8 is shared by Wes Welker of Texas Tech and Antonio Perkins of University of Oklahoma. Cincinnati added to their lead with a Justin Grutza's 20-yard scoring pass to Derrick Stewart for a final score of 24–10. The Bearcats who were led by Greg Moore and his 119 yards reclaimed the Victory Bell.

=== Northern Illinois ===
	1	2	3	4	Total
Huskies	7	10	0	11	28
RedHawks	3	9	6	7	25

Miami put up a strong offensive and defensive effort but could not beat NIU. The RedHawks out gained the Huskies by 129 yards and even with Garrett Wolfe running for 162 yards. The RedHawks were led by Dustin Woods’ eight catches for 178 yards, Andre Bratton two touchdowns and Mike Kokal 324 yards passing. Senior receiver Ryne Robinson became the program's career record holder for receptions. With seven catches for 57 yards on the night, he now has 211 career receptions.

=== Buffalo ===
	1	2	3	4	Total
RedHawks	0	14	7	17	38
Bulls	7	7	7	10	31

Due to a snow storm that hit the Buffalo area the game was played on Sunday instead of Saturday. The snow storm did not stop the RedHawks from their first victory of the season. Miami's defense and special teams provided the RedHawks with scoring opportunities. The defense intercepted Buffalo four times in the second half and their special teams blocked a punt. This led to three touchdowns in just under nine minutes. This victory gave Miami a 9–0 all-time record versus the Bulls.

=== Akron ===
	1	2	3	4	Total
Redhawks	7	3	3	0	13
Zips	3	9	6	6	24

The Akron Zips beat Miami 24–13. Miami could not take full advantage of Akron's mistakes. The Zips twice fumbled deep in its own territory, but the RedHawks managed only field goals instead of touchdowns. Miami had the lead late in the game but Dennis Kennedy ran a 7-yard touchdown with 33 seconds left in the third quarter gave Akron lead for good. Miami was led by Mike Kokal who was 21-of-46 passing for 263 and Ryne Robinson who caught nine passes for 135 yards including a 4-yard touchdown in the first quarter to give the RedHawks a 7–3 lead.

=== Ball State ===
	1	2	3	4	Total
Cardinals	7	0	3	10	20
Redhawks	0	7	3	7	17

With 1:11 remaining in the game Ball State's Nate Davis threw a 1-yard touchdown pass to Madaris Grant to give the Cardinals a victory over the RedHawks. Miami defense held the Cardinals to only 226 yards but could not prevent the late touchdown. Miami was led by Mike Kokal who completed 19 of 34 passes for 205 yards including an 11-yard touchdown pass to Ryne Robinson.

=== Western Michigan ===
	1	2	3	4	Total
Redhawks	7	7	3	7	24
Broncos	7	7	10	3	27

With 1:16 left in the game, Nate Meyer kicked a 21-yard field goal to lift Western Michigan over Miami 27–24. Miami was led by Ryne Robinson who had 10-receptions for 180 yards, giving him 1,001 yards for the season. Robinson is the first player in Miami history to eclipse 1,000 yards in consecutive seasons. Even with Robinsons strong performance, Western Michigan's defense dominated Miami's running game limiting the RedHawks to only 93 total yards rushing. The Broncos defense was led by linebacker Ameer Ismail, who tied a school record with his 15th sack of the season.

=== Bowling Green ===
	1	2	3	4	Total
RedHawks	0	0	3	6	9
Falcons	0	7	0	0	7

Bowling Green's Sean Ellis slipped on a muddy and rain soaked turf and missed a 25-yard field goal wide left with 35 seconds remaining to give the RedHawks their second win of the season by the score of 9–7. Both teams had to battle rain, wind and terrible field conditions. Miami was led by quarterback Mike Kokal who completed 12-of-24 passes for 130 yards and the game-winning touchdown to Dustin Woods with 11:24 left in the game. Ryne Robinson caught a pass for the 41st consecutive game and finished with nine catches for 86 yards.

=== Ohio U ===
	1	2	3	4	Total
Bobcats	7	6	11	10	34
RedHawks	3	7	7	7	24

In the 83rd meeting between Ohio University and Miami, the Bobcats beat the RedHawks, 34–24, to end a six-game losing streak versus Miami. It was Ohio first win at Yager Stadium since 1993. Ryne Robinson totaled 8 catches for 91 yards and a touchdown finishing his career with Miami career records for receptions (250) and yards (3,606). Robinson also broke Miami's single season record for receptions held by Martin Nance.

== Postseason ==
=== Awards ===
Joey Card – First-team All-Mid-American Conference Safety

Ryne Robinson – First-team All-Mid-American Conference Wide receiver

Joey Hudson – Second-team All-Mid-American Conference middle linebacker.
