= 2006 Eastern Michigan Eagles football team =

American college football season

2006 Eastern Michigan Eagles football
- Conference: Mid-American Conference
- West
- Record: 1–11 (1–7 MAC)
- Head coach: Jeff Genyk (3rd season)
- Offensive coordinator: Howard Feggins (3rd season)
- Home stadium: Rynearson Stadium

2006 Mid-American Conference football standings
	Conf.			Overall
Team	W		L	W		L
East Division
Ohio x	7	–	1	9	–	5
Kent State	5	–	3	6	–	6
Akron	3	–	5	5	–	7
Bowling Green	3	–	5	4	–	8
Miami (OH)	2	–	6	2	–	10
Buffalo	1	–	7	2	–	10
West Division
Central Michigan x$	7	–	1	10	–	4
Western Michigan	6	–	2	8	–	5
Northern Illinois	5	–	3	7	–	6
Ball State	5	–	3	5	–	7
Toledo	3	–	5	5	–	7
Eastern Michigan	1	–	7	1	–	11
Championship: Central Michigan 31, Ohio 10
$ – Conference champion; x – Division champion/co-champions

The 2006 Eastern Michigan Eagles football team represented Eastern Michigan University during the 2006 NCAA Division I FBS football season. Eastern Michigan competed as a member of the Mid-American Conference (MAC) West Division. The team was coached by Jeff Genyk and played their homes game in Rynearson Stadium.

== Schedule ==
Date	Time	Opponent	Site	TV	Result	Attendance
August 31	7:30 pm	at Ball State	Scheumann Stadium; Muncie, IN	Comcast	L 20–38	12,326
September 9	3:30 pm	at Michigan State*	Spartan Stadium; East Lansing, MI	ESPN+	L 20–52	69,856
September 16	2:00 pm	at Northwestern*	Ryan Field; Evanston, IL		L 6–14	21,935
September 23	3:30 pm	Central Michigan	Rynearson Stadium; Ypsilanti, MI (rivalry)	CL	L 17–24	12,386
September 30	5:00 pm	at Louisiana–Lafayette*	Cajun Field; Lafayette, LA		L 14–33	15,923
October 14	4:00 pm	at Bowling Green	Doyt Perry Stadium; Bowling Green, OH		L 21–24	14,525
October 21	3:00 pm	Toledo^{†}	Rynearson Stadium; Ypsilanti, MI	ESPN+	W 17–13	21,962
October 28	3:30 pm	at Western Michigan	Waldo Stadium; Kalamazoo, MI (Michigan MAC Trophy)		L 15–18	20,482
November 4	1:00 pm	Ohio	Rynearson Stadium; Ypsilanti, MI		L 10–16	17,749
November 11	1:00 pm	Navy*	Ford Field; Detroit, MI		L 21–49	15,816
November 17	6:00 pm	at Kent State	Dix Stadium; Kent, OH		L 6–14	8,147
November 24	11:00 am	Northern Illinois	Rynearson Stadium; Ypsilanti, MI		L 0–27	9,637
*Non-conference game; ^{†}Homecoming; All times are in Eastern time
