= 2006 Western Michigan Broncos football team =

American college football season

2006 Western Michigan Broncos football

International Bowl, L 24–27 vs. Cincinnati
- Conference: Mid-American Conference
- West Division
- Record: 8–5 (6–2 MAC)
- Head coach: Bill Cubit (2nd season)
- Offensive coordinator: George McDonald (2nd season)
- Offensive scheme: Multiple
- Base defense: Multiple
- Home stadium: Waldo Stadium (Capacity: 30,200)

2006 Mid-American Conference football standings
	Conf.			Overall
Team	W		L	W		L
East Division
Ohio x	7	–	1	9	–	5
Kent State	5	–	3	6	–	6
Akron	3	–	5	5	–	7
Bowling Green	3	–	5	4	–	8
Miami (OH)	2	–	6	2	–	10
Buffalo	1	–	7	2	–	10
West Division
Central Michigan x$	7	–	1	10	–	4
Western Michigan	6	–	2	8	–	5
Northern Illinois	5	–	3	7	–	6
Ball State	5	–	3	5	–	7
Toledo	3	–	5	5	–	7
Eastern Michigan	1	–	7	1	–	11
Championship: Central Michigan 31, Ohio 10
$ – Conference champion; x – Division champion/co-champions

The 2006 Western Michigan Broncos football team represented Western Michigan University (WMU) in the 2006 NCAA Division I FBS football season. They finished the season with an 8–5 overall record and a 6–2 record in the Mid-American Conference (MAC). The Broncos' 6–2 record gave them a second place in the MAC West Division. The team was invited to play in the 2007 International Bowl in Toronto, Ontario, Canada and lost to the Cincinnati Bearcats 27–24. The bowl game was WMU's first bowl game since the 1988 California Bowl.

The team was coached by Bill Cubit and played their homes game in Waldo Stadium in Kalamazoo, Michigan.

== Schedule ==
Date	Time	Opponent	Site	TV	Result	Attendance
September 2	6:00 pm	at Indiana*	Memorial Stadium; Bloomington, IN		L 20–39	30,733
September 9	7:00 pm	Toledo	Waldo Stadium; Kalamazoo, MI		W 31–10	24,806
September 16	3:30 pm	at Virginia*	Scott Stadium; Charlottesville, VA	ESPN360	W 17–10	59,679
September 23	7:00 pm	Temple*	Waldo Stadium; Kalamazoo, MI		W 41–7	15,739
October 7	12:00 pm	at Ohio	Peden Stadium; Athens, OH	ESPN+	L 20–27	15,026
October 14	2:00 pm	Northern Illinois^{†}	Waldo Stadium; Kalamazoo, MI	ESPN+	W 16–14	19,275
October 21	3:00 pm	at Ball State	Scheumann Stadium; Muncie, IN	CL	W 41–27	17,626
October 28	3:30 pm	Eastern Michigan	Waldo Stadium; Kalamazoo, MI (Michigan MAC Trophy)	CL	W 18–15	20,482
November 4	3:30 pm	Miami (OH)	Waldo Stadium; Kalamazoo, MI	CL	W 27–24	12,822
November 10	7:00 pm	at Central Michigan	Kelly/Shorts Stadium; Mount Pleasant, MI (WMU–CMU Rivalry Trophy, Michigan MAC Trophy)	CL	L 7–31	30,027
November 18	2:00 pm	at Florida State*	Doak Campbell Stadium; Tallahassee, FL		L 20–28	78,236
November 24	3:30 pm	at Akron	Rubber Bowl; Akron, OH	ESPNU	W 17–0	16,686
January 6, 2007	12:00 pm	vs. Cincinnati*	Rogers Centre; Toronto, ON (International Bowl)	ESPN2	L 24–27	26,717
*Non-conference game; ^{†}Homecoming; All times are in Eastern time
