= 2006 Toledo Rockets football team =

American college football season

2006 Toledo Rockets football
- Conference: Mid-American Conference
- West Division
- Record: 5–7 (3–5 MAC)
- Head coach: Tom Amstutz (6th season)
- Offensive coordinator: John Shannon (2nd season)
- Offensive scheme: Spread
- Defensive coordinator: Tim Rose (2nd season)
- Base defense: 3–4
- Home stadium: Glass Bowl

2006 Mid-American Conference football standings
| | Conf. | | | Overall |
| Team | W | | L | W | | L |
|---|---|---|---|---|---|---|
East Division
| Ohio x | 7 | – | 1 | 9 | – | 5 |
| Kent State | 5 | – | 3 | 6 | – | 6 |
| Akron | 3 | – | 5 | 5 | – | 7 |
| Bowling Green | 3 | – | 5 | 4 | – | 8 |
| Miami (OH) | 2 | – | 6 | 2 | – | 10 |
| Buffalo | 1 | – | 7 | 2 | – | 10 |
West Division
| Central Michigan x$ | 7 | – | 1 | 10 | – | 4 |
| Western Michigan | 6 | – | 2 | 8 | – | 5 |
| Northern Illinois | 5 | – | 3 | 7 | – | 6 |
| Ball State | 5 | – | 3 | 5 | – | 7 |
| Toledo | 3 | – | 5 | 5 | – | 7 |
| Eastern Michigan | 1 | – | 7 | 1 | – | 11 |
Championship: Central Michigan 31, Ohio 10
$ – Conference champion; x – Division champion/co-champions

The 2006 Toledo Rockets football team represented the University of Toledo during the 2004 NCAA Division I-A football season. They competed as a member of the Mid-American Conference (MAC) in the West Division. The Rockets were led by head coach Tom Amstutz. The Rockets offense scored 432 points while the defense allowed 404 points.

== Schedule ==
| Date | Time | Opponent | Site | TV | Result | Attendance |
|---|---|---|---|---|---|---|
| August 31 | 8:00 pm | at Iowa State* | Jack Trice Stadium; Ames, IA | | L 43–45 ^{3OT} | 42,531 |
| September 9 | 7:00 pm | at Western Michigan | Waldo Stadium; Kalamazoo, MI | | L 10–31 | 24,806 |
| September 15 | 8:00 pm | Kansas* | Glass Bowl; Toledo, OH | ESPN2 | W 37–31 ^{2OT} | 22,118 |
| September 23 | 7:00 pm | McNeese State* | Glass Bowl; Toledo, OH | | W 41–7 | 20,057 |
| September 30 | 12:00 pm | at Pittsburgh* | Heinz Field; Pittsburgh, PA | ESPNU | L 3–45 | 31,212 |
| October 7 | 7:00 pm | Central Michigan^{†} | Glass Bowl; Toledo, OH | ESPNU | L 20–42 | 20,419 |
| October 14 | 4:00 pm | at Kent State | Dix Stadium; Kent, OH | | L 14–40 | 20,212 |
| October 21 | 3:00 pm | at Eastern Michigan | Rynearson Stadium; Ypsilanti, MI | ESPN+ | L 13–17 | 21,262 |
| October 28 | 7:00 pm | Akron | Glass Bowl; Toledo, OH | ESPN360 | W 35–20 | 19,331 |
| November 7 | 7:30 pm | at Northern Illinois | Huskie Stadium; DeKalb, IL | ESPN2 | W 17–13 | 19,267 |
| November 14 | 7:00 pm | Ball State | Glass Bowl; Toledo, OH | ESPN2 | L 17–20 | 16,021 |
| November 21 | 7:00 pm | Bowling Green | Glass Bowl; Toledo, OH (Battle of I-75) | ESPN2 | W 31–21 | 23,917 |
*Non-conference game; ^{†}Homecoming; All times are in Eastern time
