= 2006 Central Michigan Chippewas football team =

American college football season

2006 Central Michigan Chippewas football

MAC champion MAC West Division champion Motor City Bowl champion

MAC Championship Game, W 31–10 vs. Ohio

Motor City Bowl, W 31–14 vs. Middle Tennessee
- Conference: Mid-American Conference
- West Division
- Record: 10–4 (7–1 MAC)
- Head coach: Brian Kelly (3rd season; regular season); Jeff Quinn (interim; bowl game)
- Offensive coordinator: Jeff Quinn (3rd season)
- Defensive coordinator: Joe Tresey (1st season)
- Home stadium: Kelly/Shorts Stadium

2006 Mid-American Conference football standings
	Conf.			Overall
Team	W		L	W		L
East Division
Ohio x	7	–	1	9	–	5
Kent State	5	–	3	6	–	6
Akron	3	–	5	5	–	7
Bowling Green	3	–	5	4	–	8
Miami (OH)	2	–	6	2	–	10
Buffalo	1	–	7	2	–	10
West Division
Central Michigan x$	7	–	1	10	–	4
Western Michigan	6	–	2	8	–	5
Northern Illinois	5	–	3	7	–	6
Ball State	5	–	3	5	–	7
Toledo	3	–	5	5	–	7
Eastern Michigan	1	–	7	1	–	11
Championship: Central Michigan 31, Ohio 10
$ – Conference champion; x – Division champion/co-champions

The 2006 Central Michigan Chippewas football team represented Central Michigan University during the 2006 NCAA Division I FBS football season. Central Michigan competed as a member of the West Division of the Mid-American Conference (MAC). The Chippewas were led by third-year head coach Brian Kelly.

Central Michigan finished the regular season with an 8–4 record and a 7–1 record in conference play, placing first in the West Division. They qualified for the MAC Championship Game, where they defeated Ohio 31–10. Central Michigan competed in the Motor City Bowl against Middle Tennessee, which they won 31–14.

== Schedule ==
Date	Time	Opponent	Site	TV	Result	Attendance	Source
August 31	6:00 pm	Boston College*	Kelly/Shorts Stadium; Mount Pleasant, MI	ESPN2	L 24–31	25,418	
September 9	12:00 pm	at No. 10 Michigan*	Michigan Stadium; Ann Arbor, MI	ESPN Plus	L 17–41	108,712	
September 16	1:00 pm	Akron	Kelly/Shorts Stadium; Mount Pleasant, MI	CL	W 24–21	20,097	
September 23	3:30 pm	at Eastern Michigan	Rynearson Stadium; Ypsilanti, MI (rivalry)	CL	W 24–17	11,686	
September 30	6:00 pm	at Kentucky*	Commonwealth Stadium; Lexington, KY		L 36–45	54,566	
October 7	7:00 pm	at Toledo	Glass Bowl; Toledo, OH	ESPNU	W 42–20	20,419	
October 14	1:00 pm	Ball State^{†}	Kelly/Shorts Stadium; Mount Pleasant, MI		W 18–7	21,013	
October 19	7:30 pm	Bowling Green	Kelly/Shorts Stadium; Mount Pleasant, MI	ESPNU	W 31–14	11,262	
November 4	1:00 pm	at Temple*	Lincoln Financial Field; Philadelphia, PA		W 42–26	16,091	
November 10	7:00 pm	Western Michigan	Kelly/Shorts Stadium; Mount Pleasant, MI (rivalry)	CL	W 31–7	30,027	
November 17	1:00 pm	at Northern Illinois	Huskie Stadium; DeKalb, IL	ESPNU	L 10–31	18,139	
November 24	1:05 pm	at Buffalo	University at Buffalo Stadium; Amherst, NY		W 55–28	11,941	
November 30	7:45 pm	vs. Ohio	Ford Field; Detroit, MI (MAC Championship)	ESPN	W 31–10	25,483	
December 26	7:30 pm	vs. Middle Tennessee	Ford Field; Detroit, MI (Motor City Bowl)	ESPN	W 31–14	54,113	
*Non-conference game; ^{†}Homecoming; Rankings from AP Poll released prior to the game; All times are in Eastern time
