= 2007 GMAC Bowl =

Ohio Bobcats	Southern Miss Golden Eagles
(9–4)	(8–5)
MAC	C-USA
7	28
Head coach: Frank Solich	Head coach: Jeff Bower
	1	2	3	4	Total
Ohio	0	0	0	7	7
Southern Miss	0	21	7	0	28
- Date: January 7, 2007
- Season: 2006
- Stadium: Ladd–Peebles Stadium
- Location: Mobile, Alabama
- MVP: Southern Miss RB Damion Fletcher
- Referee: Matt Austin (SEC)
- Attendance: 28,706

United States TV coverage
- Network: ESPN
- Announcers: Gary Thorne, Andre Ware, Rob Stone

The 2007 GMAC Bowl was an American college football bowl game. It was part of the 2006 NCAA Division I FBS football season and was the ninth edition of the bowl game. It was played on January 7, 2007, and featured the Southern Miss Golden Eagles, and the Ohio Bobcats.

Tory Harrison started the scoring, by rushing 43 yards for a touchdown, to give Southern Miss the first points of the game, 7–0. Damion Fletcher later scored on a e yard touchdown run giving the Eagles a 14–0 lead. With 1:13 left in the half James Denley intercepted an Ohio pass, and returned it 18 yards for another Southern Miss touchdown. The halftime score had Southern Miss up 21–0 over Ohio.

In the third quarter, Fletcher scored on a 9-yard touchdown run to increase the lead to 28–0. Austen Everson threw a 13-yard touchdown pass to Thomas Christy for Ohio, to make the score 28–7. That would end up being the final score of the game.
