= 2006 Kent State Golden Flashes football team =

American college football season

2006 Kent State Golden Flashes football
- Conference: Mid-American Conference
- East
- Record: 6–6 (5–3 MAC)
- Head coach: Doug Martin (3rd season)
- Offensive scheme: Air raid
- Defensive coordinator: Pete Rekstis (3rd season)
- Base defense: 4–3
- Home stadium: Dix Stadium

2006 Mid-American Conference football standings
	Conf.			Overall
Team	W		L	W		L
East Division
Ohio x	7	–	1	9	–	5
Kent State	5	–	3	6	–	6
Akron	3	–	5	5	–	7
Bowling Green	3	–	5	4	–	8
Miami (OH)	2	–	6	2	–	10
Buffalo	1	–	7	2	–	10
West Division
Central Michigan x$	7	–	1	10	–	4
Western Michigan	6	–	2	8	–	5
Northern Illinois	5	–	3	7	–	6
Ball State	5	–	3	5	–	7
Toledo	3	–	5	5	–	7
Eastern Michigan	1	–	7	1	–	11
Championship: Central Michigan 31, Ohio 10
$ – Conference champion; x – Division champion/co-champions

The 2006 Kent State Golden Flashes football team represented the Kent State University during the 2006 NCAA Division I FBS football season. Kent State competed as a member of the Mid-American Conference (MAC), and played their home games at Dix Stadium. The Golden Flashes were led by third-year head coach Doug Martin.

== Schedule ==
Date	Time	Opponent	Site	TV	Result	Attendance
August 31	7:30 pm	Minnesota*	Dix Stadium; Kent, OH	ESPN360	L 0–44	20,126
September 9	1:00 pm	at Army*	Michie Stadium; West Point, NY	ESPNC	L 14–17	25,123
September 16	2:00 pm	at Miami (OH)	Yager Stadium; Oxford, OH	ESPN Plus	W 16–14	10,486
September 23	1:00 pm	at Bowling Green	Doyt Perry Stadium; Bowling Green, OH (Anniversary Award)	BCSN	W 38–3	12,967
September 30	2:00 pm	Akron	Dix Stadium; Kent, OH (Wagon Wheel)	ESPN Plus	W 37–15	22,013
October 7	1:00 pm	at Temple	Lincoln Financial Field; Philadelphia, PA		W 28–17	13,704
October 14	4:00 pm	Toledo^{†}	Dix Stadium; Kent, OH		W 40–14	20,212
October 28	2:00 pm	Ohio	Dix Stadium; Kent, OH	ESPN Plus	L 7–17	14,520
November 4	1:00 pm	at Buffalo	University at Buffalo Stadium; Amherst, NY		L 14–41	11,764
November 11	3:30 pm	at No. 20 Virginia Tech*	Lane Stadium; Blacksburg, VA	ESPNU	L 0–23	66,233
November 17	6:00 pm	Eastern Michigan	Dix Stadium; Kent, OH		W 14–6	8,147
November 24	12:00 pm	at Ball State	Scheumann Stadium; Muncie, IN		L 6–30	16,189
*Non-conference game; ^{†}Homecoming; Rankings from AP Poll released prior to the game; All times are in Eastern time
