= 2006 Poinsettia Bowl =

2006 San Diego County Credit Union Poinsettia Bowl
Northern Illinois Huskies	TCU Horned Frogs
(7–5)	(10–2)
MAC	Mountain West
7	37
Head coach: Joe Novak	Head coach: Gary Patterson
	AP / Coaches; 25 / 24
	1	2	3	4	Total
Northern Illinois	0	0	0	7	7
TCU	6	10	14	7	37
- Date: December 19, 2006
- Season: 2006
- Stadium: Qualcomm Stadium
- Location: San Diego, California
- MVP: Jeff Ballard (offense), Tommy Blake (defense)
- Referee: Greg Burks (Big 12)
- Attendance: 29,709
- Payout: US$750,000 per team

United States TV coverage
- Network: ESPN
- Announcers: Rece Davis, Lou Holtz, Mark May, and Rob Stone

The 2006 Poinsettia Bowl was an American college football bowl game between the Texas Christian University Horned Frogs (TCU) and the Northern Illinois Huskies (NIU) on December 19, 2006 at Qualcomm Stadium in San Diego, California. TCU defeated NIU 37–7 in this game, which was the second year in the bowl's existence.

== Scoring summary ==
- TCU - Hobbs 4 yard touchdown run (Manfedini kick blocked), 1st 12:03 (3-26, 0:46)
- TCU - Ballard 10 yard touchdown run (Manfredini kick), 2nd 14:49 (7-55, 2:09)
- TCU - Manfredini 25 yard field goal, 2nd 0:00 (12-77, 3:52)
- TCU - Ballard 1 yard touchdown run (Manfredini kick), 3rd 12:06 (7-80, 2:54)
- TCU - Ballard 6 yard touchdown run (LoCoco kick), 3rd 9:08 (3-19, 1:11)
- Northern Illinois - Tranchitella 32 yard blocked punt return (Nendick kick), 4th 14:14
- TCU - Hecht 6 yard touchdown pass from Ballard (LoCoco kick), 4th 10:55 (6-62, 3:19)

TCU rushed for 198 yards while NIU rushed for -20 yards. The Horned Frogs threw for 258 yards while the Huskies threw for 80 yards. They controlled the ball for 32:24 of the game while Jeff Ballard threw 19-of-29 for 258 yards, with three touchdowns runs (rushing for 19 yards on 11 carries). It was not so much that NIU had terrible rushing as it was their quarterback Dan Nicholson, who was sacked five times for -48 yards. TCU finished the season 11-2 while NIU finished 7-6.

== Statistics ==
Statistics	NIU	TCU
First downs	5	23
Plays–yards	48–60	75–456
Rushes–yards	29-(-20)	46-198
Passing yards	80	264
Passing: comp–att–int	6-19-1	19-29-0
Time of possession	16:56	19:44

Team	Category	Player	Statistics
Northern Illinois	Passing	Dan Nicholson	6/18, 80 yards, 1 INT
Northern Illinois	Rushing	Garrett Wolfe	20 carries, 28 yards
Northern Illinois	Receiving	Matt Simon	1 reception, 62 yards
TCU	Passing	Jeff Ballard	19/29, 258 yards, 1 TD
TCU	Rushing	Lonta Hobbs	18 carries, 109 yards, 1 TD
TCU	Receiving	Quentily Harmon	6 receptions, 94 yards
