= 2006 MAC Championship Game =

2006 Marathon MAC Championship Game
- Conference Championship
Central Michigan Chippewas	Ohio Bobcats
(8–4)	(9–3)
31	10
Head coach: Brian Kelly	Head coach: Frank Solich
	1	2	3	4	Total
Central Michigan	7	10	0	14	31
Ohio	0	7	3	0	10
- Date: November 30, 2006
- Season: 2006
- Stadium: Ford Field
- Location: Detroit, Michigan
- MVP: Damien Linson (WR, CMU)
- Favorite: Central Michigan by 3
- Referee: Tom McCabe
- Attendance: 25,483

United States TV coverage
- Network: ESPN
- Announcers: Chris Fowler, Kirk Herbstreit, and Erin Andrews

2006 Mid-American Conference football standings
	Conf.			Overall
Team	W		L	W		L
East Division
Ohio x	7	–	1	9	–	5
Kent State	5	–	3	6	–	6
Akron	3	–	5	5	–	7
Bowling Green	3	–	5	4	–	8
Miami (OH)	2	–	6	2	–	10
Buffalo	1	–	7	2	–	10
West Division
Central Michigan x$	7	–	1	10	–	4
Western Michigan	6	–	2	8	–	5
Northern Illinois	5	–	3	7	–	6
Ball State	5	–	3	5	–	7
Toledo	3	–	5	5	–	7
Eastern Michigan	1	–	7	1	–	11
Championship: Central Michigan 31, Ohio 10
$ – Conference champion; x – Division champion/co-champions

The 2006 MAC Championship Game was played on November 30, 2006, at Ford Field in Detroit, Michigan. The game featured the winner of each division of the Mid-American Conference. The game featured the Ohio Bobcats, of the East Division, and the Central Michigan Chippewas, of the West Division. The Chippewas beat the Bobcats 31–10.
