= 2006 Northern Illinois Huskies football team =

American college football season

2006 Northern Illinois Huskies football

Poinsettia Bowl, L 7–37 vs. TCU
- Conference: Mid-American Conference
- West Division
- Record: 7–6 (5–3 MAC)
- Head coach: Joe Novak (11th season)
- Offensive coordinator: John Bond (3rd season)
- Defensive coordinator: Denny Doornbos (3rd season)
- MVP: Garrett Wolfe
- Captains: Doug Free; Dustin Utschig; Ken West; Garrett Wolfe
- Home stadium: Huskie Stadium

2006 Mid-American Conference football standings
	Conf.			Overall
Team	W		L	W		L
East Division
Ohio x	7	–	1	9	–	5
Kent State	5	–	3	6	–	6
Akron	3	–	5	5	–	7
Bowling Green	3	–	5	4	–	8
Miami (OH)	2	–	6	2	–	10
Buffalo	1	–	7	2	–	10
West Division
Central Michigan x$	7	–	1	10	–	4
Western Michigan	6	–	2	8	–	5
Northern Illinois	5	–	3	7	–	6
Ball State	5	–	3	5	–	7
Toledo	3	–	5	5	–	7
Eastern Michigan	1	–	7	1	–	11
Championship: Central Michigan 31, Ohio 10
$ – Conference champion; x – Division champion/co-champions

The 2006 Northern Illinois Huskies football team represented Northern Illinois University as a member of the West Division of the Mid-American Conference (MAC) during the 2006 NCAA Division I FBS football season. Led by 11th-year head coach Joe Novak, the Huskies compiled an overall record of 7–6 with a mark of 5–3 in conference play, tying for third place in the MAC's West Division. Northern Illinois was invited to the Poinsettia Bowl, where they lost to TCU. The team played home games at Huskie Stadium in DeKalb, Illinois.

== Schedule ==
Date	Time	Opponent	Site	TV	Result	Attendance
September 2	2:30 pm	at No. 1 Ohio State*	Ohio Stadium; Columbus, OH	ABC	L 12–35	103,896
September 9	2:05 pm	Ohio	Huskie Stadium; DeKalb, IL	CSNC	L 23–35	19,341
September 16	6:35 pm	Buffalo	Huskie Stadium; DeKalb, IL	CSNC	W 31–13	21,117
September 22	4:00 pm	Indiana State*	Huskie Stadium; DeKalb, IL	CSNC	W 48–14	19,720
September 30	5:30 pm	at Ball State	Scheumann Stadium; Muncie, IN (rivalry)	CSNC	W 40–28	10,128
October 8	7:00 pm	at Miami (OH)	Yager Stadium; Oxford, OH	ESPN	W 28–25	12,197
October 14	1:00 pm	at Western Michigan	Waldo Stadium; Kalamazoo, MI	ESPN Plus	L 14–16	19,275
October 21	2:05 pm	Temple*	Huskie Stadium; DeKalb, IL	CSNC	W 43–21	27,039
October 28	6:00 pm	at Iowa*	Kinnick Stadium; Iowa City, IA	ESPNU	L 14–24	70,585
November 7	6:30 pm	Toledo	Huskie Stadium; DeKalb, IL	ESPN2	L 13–17	19,267
November 17	7:05 pm	Central Michigan	Huskie Stadium; DeKalb, IL	ESPNU	W 31–10	18,139
November 24	11:00 am	at Eastern Michigan	Rynearson Stadium; Ypsilanti, MI	CSNC	W 27–0	8,937
December 19	7:00 pm	vs. No. 25 TCU*	Qualcomm Stadium; San Diego, CA (Poinsettia Bowl)	ESPN2	L 7–37	29,709
*Non-conference game; Rankings from AP Poll released prior to the game; All times are in Central time
