= 2006 Ohio Bobcats football team =

American college football season

2006 Ohio Bobcats football

MAC East Division champion

MAC Championship Game, L 10–31 vs. Central Michigan

GMAC Bowl, L 7–28 vs. Southern Miss
- Conference: Mid-American Conference
- East
- Record: 9–5 (7–1 MAC)
- Head coach: Frank Solich (2nd season)
- Offensive coordinator: Tim Albin (2nd season)
- Defensive coordinator: Jim Burrow (2nd season)
- Home stadium: Peden Stadium

2006 Mid-American Conference football standings
	Conf.			Overall
Team	W		L	W		L
East Division
Ohio x	7	–	1	9	–	5
Kent State	5	–	3	6	–	6
Akron	3	–	5	5	–	7
Bowling Green	3	–	5	4	–	8
Miami (OH)	2	–	6	2	–	10
Buffalo	1	–	7	2	–	10
West Division
Central Michigan x$	7	–	1	10	–	4
Western Michigan	6	–	2	8	–	5
Northern Illinois	5	–	3	7	–	6
Ball State	5	–	3	5	–	7
Toledo	3	–	5	5	–	7
Eastern Michigan	1	–	7	1	–	11
Championship: Central Michigan 31, Ohio 10
$ – Conference champion; x – Division champion/co-champions

The 2006 Ohio Bobcats football team represented Ohio University during the 2006 NCAA Division I FBS football season. Ohio competed as a member of the Mid-American Conference (MAC). The Bobcats were led by Frank Solich in his second year as head coach. They played their home games in Peden Stadium in Athens, Ohio.

== Schedule ==
Date	Time	Opponent	Site	TV	Result	Attendance	Source
September 2	7:00 pm	Tennessee–Martin*	Peden Stadium; Athens, OH		W 29–3	15,010	
September 9	3:00 pm	at Northern Illinois	Huskie Stadium; DeKalb, IL	CSNC	W 35–23	19,341	
September 16	3:30 pm	at Rutgers*	Rutgers Stadium; Piscataway, NJ	ESPN+	L 7–24	41,102	
September 23	2:00 pm	at Missouri*	Faurot Field; Columbia, MO		L 6–31	50,098	
September 30	2:00 pm	Bowling Green	Peden Stadium; Athens, OH		L 9–21	18,546	
October 7	12:00 pm	Western Michigan	Peden Stadium; Athens, OH	FSN	W 27–20	15,026	
October 14	7:00 pm	at Illinois*	Memorial Stadium; Champaign, IL		W 20–17	34,328	
October 21	2:00 pm	Buffalo^{†}	Peden Stadium; Athens, OH		W 42–7	19,409	
October 28	2:00 pm	at Kent State	Dix Stadium; Kent, OH	ESPN+	W 17–7	14,520	
November 4	1:00 pm	at Eastern Michigan	Rynearson Stadium; Ypsilanti, MI		W 16–10	17,049	
November 16	7:30 pm	Akron	Peden Stadium; Athens, OH	ESPNU	W 17–7	15,631	
November 24	12:00 pm	at Miami (OH)	Yager Stadium; Oxford, OH (Battle of the Bricks)	ESPNU	W 34–24	15,926	
November 30	7:30 pm	vs. Central Michigan	Ford Field; Detroit, MI (MAC Championship Game)	ESPN	L 10–31	25,483	
January 7	8:00 pm	vs. Southern Miss*	Ladd–Peebles Stadium; Mobile, AL (GMAC Bowl)	ESPN	L 7–28	38,751	
*Non-conference game; ^{†}Homecoming; All times are in Eastern time
