= 2006 Florida Gators football team =

101st football season in school history; second national championship victory

2006 Florida Gators football

Consensus national champion SEC champion SEC Eastern Division champion

SEC Championship Game, W 38–28 vs. Arkansas

BCS National Championship Game, W 41–14 vs. Ohio State
- Conference: Southeastern Conference
- Eastern Division

Ranking
- Coaches: No. 1
- AP: No. 1
- Record: 13–1 (7–1 SEC)
- Head coach: Urban Meyer (2nd season)
- Offensive coordinator: Dan Mullen (2nd season)
- Offensive scheme: Spread
- Co-defensive coordinators: Greg Mattison (2nd season); Charlie Strong (4th season)
- Base defense: 4–3
- Captains: Dallas Baker; Jemalle Cornelius; Earl Everett; Billy Latsko; Chris Leak; Ray McDonald
- Home stadium: Ben Hill Griffin Stadium

2006 Southeastern Conference football standings
| | Conf. | | | Overall |
| Team | W | | L | W | | L |
|---|---|---|---|---|---|---|
Eastern Division
| No. 1 Florida x$# | 7 | – | 1 | 13 | – | 1 |
| No. 25 Tennessee | 5 | – | 3 | 9 | – | 4 |
| No. 23 Georgia | 4 | – | 4 | 9 | – | 4 |
| Kentucky | 4 | – | 4 | 8 | – | 5 |
| South Carolina | 3 | – | 5 | 8 | – | 5 |
| Vanderbilt | 1 | – | 7 | 4 | – | 8 |
Western Division
| No. 15 Arkansas x | 7 | – | 1 | 10 | – | 4 |
| No. 9 Auburn | 6 | – | 2 | 11 | – | 2 |
| No. 3 LSU % | 6 | – | 2 | 11 | – | 2 |
| Alabama | 2 | – | 6 | 6 | – | 7 |
| Ole Miss | 2 | – | 6 | 4 | – | 8 |
| Mississippi State | 1 | – | 7 | 3 | – | 9 |
Championship: Florida 38, Arkansas 28
# – BCS National Champion; $ – BCS representative as conference champion; % – BCS at-large representative; x – Division champion/co-champions; Alabama had all victories vacated by the NCAA in 2010. As such, the official record for Alabama is 0–7 (0–6).; Rankings from AP Poll

The 2006 Florida Gators football team represented the University of Florida in the sport of American football during the 2006 NCAA Division I FBS football season. The Gators competed in the Football Bowl Subdivision (FBS) of the National Collegiate Athletic Association (NCAA) and the Eastern Division of the Southeastern Conference (SEC), and played their home games at Ben Hill Griffin Stadium on the university's Gainesville, Florida campus. The season was the second for head coach Urban Meyer, who led the Gators to an SEC Championship, a BCS National Championship, and an overall win–loss record of 13–1 (.929). Their one loss coming from an upset by the Auburn Tigers.

Florida overcame the toughest schedule in the nation by opponent winning percentage to become national champions. The Gators won their seventh SEC title by defeating the Arkansas Razorbacks 38–28 in the SEC Championship Game on December 2, 2006, then defeated the Ohio State Buckeyes 41–14 in the BCS National Championship Game on January 8, 2007, beginning the SEC's streak of seven consecutive national championships. The 2006 Florida Gators remain the last team to win a national championship averaging under 30 points per game with 29.8.

During the 2006 season, the Gators also celebrated two milestones in their history: the tenth anniversary of their first national football championship in 1996, and 100 years of Florida football dating to their first season in 1906.

In addition, with the men's basketball team winning the 2006 and 2007 NCAA men's basketball national championships, the University of Florida became the first Division I school to ever win the football and men's basketball titles during the same year. Coincidentally, the Gators again faced and defeated Ohio State in the 2007 NCAA basketball championship game, also marking the first time in college sports history that identical matchups and results have occurred in both football and basketball championships.

== Schedule ==
| Date | Opponent | Rank | Site | TV | Result | Attendance |
|---|---|---|---|---|---|---|
| September 2 | Southern Miss* | No. 7 | Ben Hill Griffin Stadium; Gainesville, FL | PPV | W 34–7 | 90,043 |
| September 9 | UCF* | No. 7 | Ben Hill Griffin Stadium; Gainesville, FL | PPV | W 42–0 | 90,210 |
| September 16 | at No. 13 Tennessee | No. 7 | Neyland Stadium; Knoxville, TN (rivalry) | CBS | W 21–20 | 106,818 |
| September 23 | Kentucky | No. 5 | Ben Hill Griffin Stadium; Gainesville, FL (rivalry) | ESPN | W 26–7 | 90,292 |
| September 30 | Alabama | No. 5 | Ben Hill Griffin Stadium; Gainesville, FL (rivalry) | CBS | W 28–13 | 90,671 |
| October 7 | No. 9 LSU^{†} | No. 5 | Ben Hill Griffin Stadium; Gainesville, FL (rivalry, College GameDay) | CBS | W 23–10 | 90,714 |
| October 14 | at No. 11 Auburn | No. 2 | Jordan–Hare Stadium; Auburn, AL (rivalry, College GameDay) | ESPN | L 17–27 | 87,451 |
| October 28 | vs. No. 25 Georgia | No. 9 | Alltel Stadium; Jacksonville, FL (rivalry) | CBS | W 21–14 | 84,572 |
| November 4 | at Vanderbilt | No. 7 | Vanderbilt Stadium; Nashville, TN | LFS | W 25–19 | 38,134 |
| November 11 | South Carolina | No. 6 | Ben Hill Griffin Stadium; Gainesville, FL | CBS | W 17–16 | 90,703 |
| November 18 | Western Carolina* | No. 3 | Ben Hill Griffin Stadium; Gainesville, FL | PPV | W 62–0 | 90,233 |
| November 25 | at Florida State* | No. 4 | Doak Campbell Stadium; Tallahassee, FL (rivalry) | ABC | W 21–14 | 83,507 |
| December 2 | vs. No. 8 Arkansas | No. 4 | Georgia Dome; Atlanta, GA (SEC Championship) | CBS | W 38–28 | 73,374 |
| January 8, 2007 | vs. No. 1 Ohio State* | No. 2 | University of Phoenix Stadium; Glendale, AZ (BCS National Championship Game, College GameDay) | Fox | W 41–14 | 74,628 |
*Non-conference game; ^{†}Homecoming; Rankings from AP Poll released prior to the game

== Rankings ==
Ranking movements Legend: ██ Increase in ranking ██ Decrease in ranking ( ) = First-place votes
| | Week | | | | | | | | | | | | | | | |
| Poll | Pre | 1 | 2 | 3 | 4 | 5 | 6 | 7 | 8 | 9 | 10 | 11 | 12 | 13 | 14 | Final |
|---|---|---|---|---|---|---|---|---|---|---|---|---|---|---|---|---|
| AP | 7 | 7 | 7 | 5 | 5 | 5 | 2 | 9 | 9 | 7 | 6 | 3 | 4 | 4 | 2 | 1 (64) |
| Coaches | 8 | 7 | 6 | 5 | 5 | 5 | 3 (1) | 10 | 8 | 7 | 6 | 3 | 4 | 4 | 2 | 1 (63) |
| Harris | Not released | | | | 6 | 5 (1) | 3 (1) | 9 | 9 | 7 | 6 | 4 | 4 | 4 | 2 (1) | Not released |
| BCS | Not released | | | | | | | 6 | 6 | 4 | 4 | 4 | 4 | 4 | 2 | Not released |

== Before the season ==
Most polls had Florida listed as one of the top 10 teams entering the season. The Gators had their best pre-season ranking from College Football News, which listed them at No. 2, behind only defending champion Texas.

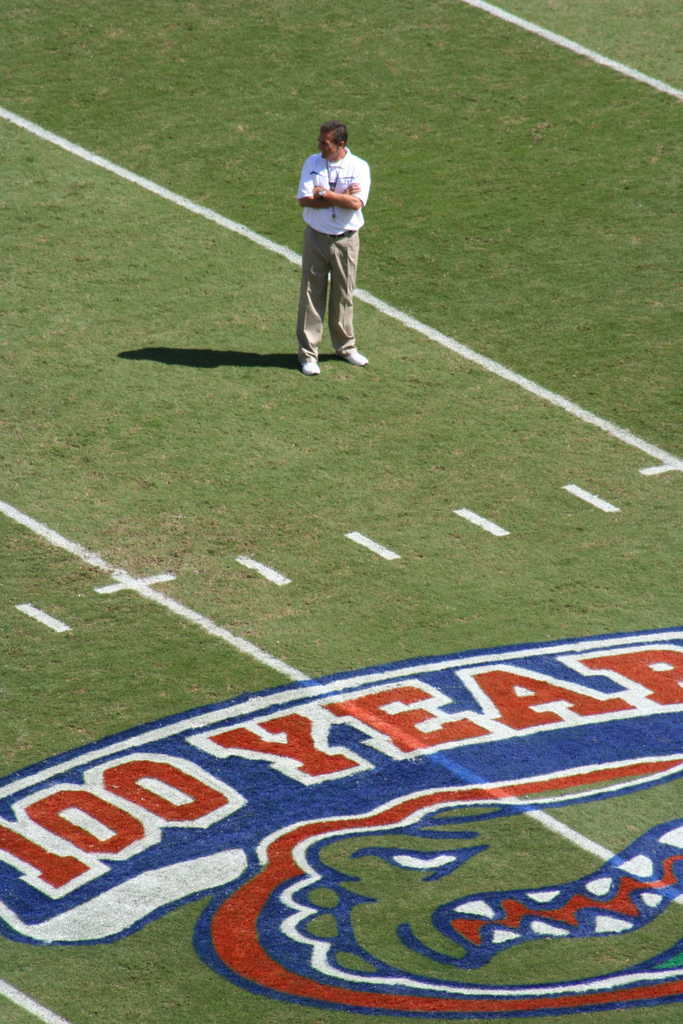
Urban Meyer and the Gators celebrated 100 years of Florida football.

Most of the starters returned from a 2005 team that went 9–3 and they were bolstered by a top-rated recruiting class the previous February. The Gators' schedule included a four-game stretch against teams likely to be in the top-15 teams, starting with Alabama on September 30.

=== Ten-year national championship anniversary ===
The Gators celebrated the ten-year anniversary of winning their 1996 national championship in football during the opening game against Southern Miss. Among the attendees was Steve Spurrier, who coached the team to its only championship that season who was at the time coaching at the University of South Carolina. Many people had speculated that because of Spurrier's hiring as the South Carolina Gamecocks coach he would be booed, but instead he received a very loud ovation during the ceremony.

=== 100 year anniversary ===
The Gators also celebrated 100 years since the start of their football program in 1906.

== Game summaries ==
=== Southern Miss ===
Southern Miss at Florida

| Team | 1 | 2 | 3 | 4 | Total |
|---|---|---|---|---|---|
| So. Miss | 7 | 0 | 0 | 0 | 7 |
| • Florida | 7 | 7 | 7 | 13 | 34 |

- Date: September 2
- Location: Ben Hill Griffin Stadium, Gainesville, Florida

The season opened in the Swamp against the Southern Mississippi Golden Eagles. The Gators scored the last 34 points of the game after surrendering a touchdown with 12:40 to play in the 1st quarter. Chris Leak's third pass attempt of the game was intercepted by the Golden Eagles, who scored on a 6-yard Damion Carter pass to Jeremy Young 3 plays later.

Leak rebounded to finish 21-of-30 for 248 yards and 3 touchdowns. DeShawn Wynn and Tim Tebow each rushed for a touchdown for the Gators.

=== Central Florida ===
Central Florida at Florida

| Team | 1 | 2 | 3 | 4 | Total |
|---|---|---|---|---|---|
| UCF | 0 | 0 | 0 | 0 | 0 |
| • Florida | 7 | 27 | 8 | 0 | 42 |

- Date: September 9
- Location: Ben Hill Griffin Stadium, Gainesville, Florida

Despite giving up four turnovers and forcing none, the Gators easily beat the spread for the second time this season. By forcing a safety in the third quarter, the Gator defense outscored the blanked Golden Knights offense. It was the Gators' first shutout since blanking Mississippi State on September 29, 2001. Visiting Central Florida averaged just 2.6 yards per play and 153 total yards in the game.

Florida quarterback Chris Leak was 19-of-29 for 352 yards and four touchdowns. Freshman receiver Percy Harvin had a coming-out game with a 58-yard touchdown reception to open the scoring, en route to a 4-catch, 99-yards receiving day. Andre Caldwell caught two touchdowns, and Dallas Baker added one more for the Gators. Florida reserve QB Tim Tebow led the game in rushing, with 61 yards.

=== Tennessee ===
Florida at Tennessee

| Team | 1 | 2 | 3 | 4 | Total |
|---|---|---|---|---|---|
| • Florida | 7 | 0 | 7 | 7 | 21 |
| Tennessee | 3 | 7 | 7 | 3 | 20 |

- Date: September 16
- Location: Neyland Stadium, Knoxville, Tennessee

Florida traveled to Knoxville to face the Tennessee Volunteers. Florida jumped out to an early 7–0 lead, but the Vols quickly took the momentum back when wide receiver Lucas Taylor threw a 47-yard touchdown pass to LaMarcus Coker. The Volunteers shot out of the gate in the second half with an impressive touchdown drive capped by a one-yard touchdown run by Montario Hardesty, giving the Vols a 17–7 lead.

Chris Leak rallied the Gators to within a field goal when he found Dallas Baker for a four-yard touchdown. Tennessee pulled ahead by six when James Wilhoit hit a 51-yard field goal early in the fourth. Leak again rallied the team, but it was freshman Tim Tebow who made a huge play when he converted a crucial fourth down inside Tennessee territory. Leak came back into the game, and continued his strong play, finding Baker again for a 21-yard touchdown pass which would eventually prove to be the game winning score. The following drive, Junior quarterback Erik Ainge threw an interception to Reggie Nelson to seal a Gator victory. The win made the Gators No. 5 in the AP and Coaches polls.

=== Kentucky ===
Kentucky at Florida

| Team | 1 | 2 | 3 | 4 | Total |
|---|---|---|---|---|---|
| Kentucky | 0 | 7 | 0 | 0 | 7 |
| • Florida | 6 | 6 | 7 | 7 | 26 |

- Date: September 23
- Location: Ben Hill Griffin Stadium, Gainesville, Florida

The Gators quickly jumped out to a 6–0 lead on a trick play that led to a Chris Leak pass to Jemalle Cornelius for a touchdown just over two minutes into the game. From there, the Gators offense stagnated for most of the first half. The Wildcats took the lead briefly with a touchdown with under two minutes to play in the half, but the Gators responded with a touchdown of their own on a DeShawn Wynn run with :26 left in the half to take a 12–7 lead. Both Gator PATs were blocked in the half.

The second half of the game was more of a defensive struggle for both teams, but the Gators scored two more touchdowns (and made both PATs) to make the final score 26–7. Freshman Tim Tebow—the backup quarterback—led the Gators in rushing for the second time in four games with 73 yards on six rushes.

The week prior to the game, it was announced that DT Marcus Thomas was indefinitely suspended after failing a drug test. He appealed the suspension, but missed the Kentucky game while awaiting word on the appeal.

=== Alabama ===
Alabama Crimson Tide (3–1) at Florida Gators (4–0)

| Quarter | 1 | 2 | 3 | 4 | Total |
|---|---|---|---|---|---|
| Alabama | 7 | 3 | 0 | 3 | 13 |
| Florida | 0 | 7 | 7 | 14 | 28 |

at Ben Hill Griffin Stadium • Gainesville, Florida

- Date: September 30
- Game time: 3:30 p.m.
- Game weather: Mostly sunny • 84 °F (29 °C) • Wind NE 6 miles per hour (9.7 km/h; 5.2 kn)
- Game attendance: 90,671
- Referee: Penn Wagers
- TV: CBS
- Box Score

Game information

Alabama

- John Parker Wilson
  21/40, 240 Yds, 3 INT
- Kenneth Darby
  14 Rush, 76 Yds
- DJ Hall
  6 Rec, 117 Yds

Florida

- Chris Leak
  14/20, 174 Yds, 2 TD
- DeShawn Wynn
  12 Rush, 50 Yds
- Jemalle Cornelius
  4 Rec, 79 Yds

Florida went with a throwback uniform style for the game, wearing uniforms from the mid-1960s as a part of the 100-year celebration of Florida Football. Prior to the game, Florida also unveiled its four initial entries into the Gator Football Ring of Honor—Emmitt Smith, Danny Wuerffel, Steve Spurrier, and Jack Youngblood.

Florida entered the game hoping to avenge a 31–3 loss in Tuscaloosa, Alabama the previous season, and end a rare three-game losing streak against a conference opponent.

The Gators trailed for nearly the entire first three quarters. After a botched snap between center Steve Rissler and quarterback Chris Leak, Alabama's Prince Hall returned the fumble for the Crimson Tide's only touchdown of the game. The Tide added a field goal to take a 10–0 lead that held until just before the half. Late in the first half, Chris Leak had a career-long 45-yard run. Three plays later, a Tim Tebow designed sneak scored from 2 yards out, putting the Gators on the board with 1:45 left in the half.

The Gators took their first lead with 2:39 left in the third quarter on a Leak pass to Andre Caldwell, making it 14–10. The Tide kept it close, kicking a 26-yard field goal to make it a 1-point game in the fourth quarter. Leak found Dallas Baker on a 21-yard touchdown pass to strengthen Florida's lead, and safety Reggie Nelson picked off John Parker Wilson's pass and took it 70 yards for the score to put the game out of reach.

Scoring summary

| Quarter | Time | Drive | | | Team | Scoring information | Score | |
| Quarter | Time | Plays | Yards | TOP | Team | Scoring information | ALA | FLA |
|---|---|---|---|---|---|---|---|---|
| 1 | 2:47 | | | | Alabama | Fumble recovery returned 50 yards for touchdown by Prince Hall, Jamie Christensen kick good | 7 | 0 |
| 2 | 12:44 | 7 | 40 | 2:45 | Alabama | 21-yard field goal by Jamie Christensen | 10 | 0 |
| 2 | 1:45 | 12 | 95 | 5:28 | Florida | Tim Tebow 2-yard touchdown run, Chris Hetland kick good | 10 | 7 |
| 3 | 2:39 | 7 | 80 | 2:35 | Florida | Andre Caldwell 16-yard touchdown reception from Chris Leak, Chris Hetland kick good | 10 | 14 |
| 4 | 12:47 | 12 | 54 | 4:52 | Alabama | 26-yard field goal by Jamie Christensen | 13 | 14 |
| 4 | 6:47 | 3 | 34 | 1:36 | Florida | Dallas Baker 21-yard touchdown reception from Chris Leak, Chris Hetland kick good | 13 | 21 |
| 4 | 4:19 | | | | Florida | Interception returned 70 yards for touchdown by Reggie Nelson, Chris Hetland kick good | 13 | 28 |
| "TOP" = time of possession. For other American football terms, see Glossary of American football. | | | | | | | 13 | 28 |

=== LSU ===
LSU at Florida

| Team | 1 | 2 | 3 | 4 | Total |
|---|---|---|---|---|---|
| LSU | 7 | 0 | 0 | 3 | 10 |
| • Florida | 7 | 7 | 9 | 0 | 23 |

- Date: October 7
- Location: Ben Hill Griffin Stadium, Gainesville, Florida
- TV announcers (CBS): Verne Lundquist, Gary Danielson & Tracy Wolfson

ESPN's College GameDay was on campus for the Top-10 tilt between the LSU Tigers and the Gators. The attendance of 90,714 was two shy of the stadium record.

Like in their other 3 SEC victories, the Gators fell behind in the first half, allowing an LSU touchdown drive after a fumble on the opening drive. After the Tigers muffed on a Gator punt a drive later, reserve freshman QB Tim Tebow scored on a QB sneak from one yard out to tie the game. The Gators also scored right before halftime on Tebow's first touchdown pass, where he faked a leap over the pile and threw the ball to a falling Tate Casey. Tebow added a more conventional touchdown pass to Louis Murphy early in the third quarter.

The Tigers' Early Doucet fumbled the second half kickoff into the end zone for a safety, which led to the long Tebow throw on the next drive. An LSU field goal early in the fourth quarter would cut the Florida lead to 23–10. The Tigers drove deep into Gator territory on two other occasions in the fourth quarter, but the Gator defense intercepted LSU quarterback Jamarcus Russell on both drives to seal the victory. Starting QB Chris Leak, despite going 17-of-26 passing, was held without a touchdown for the first time this season.

=== Auburn ===
Florida at Auburn

| Team | 1 | 2 | 3 | 4 | Total |
|---|---|---|---|---|---|
| Florida | 3 | 14 | 0 | 0 | 17 |
| • Auburn | 3 | 8 | 7 | 9 | 27 |

- Date: October 14
- Location: Jordan–Hare Stadium, Auburn, Alabama
- TV announcers (ESPN): Mike Patrick (play-by-play), Todd Blackledge (color) & Holly Rowe (sideline reporter)

ESPN's College GameDay was at Jordan–Hare Stadium to cover the critical SEC matchup between the number two ranked Gators and the number eleven ranked Auburn Tigers. Both Lee Corso and Kirk Herbstreit picked the Gators to defeat the Tigers. The game was broadcast on ESPN Full Circle.

The Tigers scored early, taking the opening drive to the Gators' 5-yard-line before being forced to kick a field goal. The Gators responded with a field goal, their first of the season for a 3–3 tie at the end of the first quarter. In the second quarter, with a touchdown pass from Chris Leak to Dallas Baker the Gators took a 10–3 lead. Soon thereafter, the Gators seemingly averted danger when they stripped the ball from the Tigers at the goal line. One play later, however, a Jim Tartt holding penalty in the end zone forced a safety, giving Auburn the ball back and two points. With about 5 minutes left in the 2nd quarter Auburn kicked another field goal to make the score 10–8. The Gators strengthened their lead to 17–8 on a Tim Tebow run. Auburn kicked one additional field goal with 30 seconds in the quarter to cut the Gator lead to 17–11 at the half.

The second half belonged entirely to the Tigers, as they shut Florida out in the half and blocked a punt for a score to take the lead by one point in the third quarter. The Gators threatened to take the lead midway through the fourth until a controversial Leak fumble caused by Tray Blackmon of the Tigers gave Auburn the ball. A late field goal put Auburn up four points with just over 30 seconds to go in the game. In desperation, Florida responded on the last play of the game with a failed hook and lateral play, which Auburn's defense was able to pick up and return for a score as time expired.

=== Georgia ===
Florida Gators (6–1) vs. Georgia Bulldogs (6–2)

| Quarter | 1 | 2 | 3 | 4 | Total |
|---|---|---|---|---|---|
| Florida | 7 | 7 | 7 | 0 | 21 |
| Georgia | 0 | 0 | 7 | 7 | 14 |

at Alltel Stadium • Jacksonville, Florida

- Date: October 28
- Game time: 3:30 p.m.
- Game weather: Partly cloudy • 69 °F (21 °C) • 17 miles per hour (27 km/h; 15 kn) W/NW
- Game attendance: 84,572
- Referee: Steve Shaw
- TV announcers (CBS): Verne Lundquist, Gary Danielson, and Tracy Wolfson
- Box Score

Game information

Florida

- Chris Leak
  14/28, 163 Yds, TD, INT
- Percy Harvin
  8 Rush, 37 Yds
- Andre Caldwell
  8 Rec, 88 Yds, TD

Georgia

- Matthew Stafford
  13/33, 151 Yds, 2 INT
- Kregg Lumpkin
  11 Rush, 43 Yds, TD
- Brannan Southerland
  3 Rec, 31 Yds

As the Gators came into their annual rivalry game with Georgia, they were heavily favored. Florida scored on their first possession of the game, moving the ball very effectively with a blend of running and passing. Wide receiver Andre Caldwell capped off the drive with a 12-yard touchdown run off a reverse. Florida's defense, which had been touted as one of the best in the SEC, lived up to their billing, stifling the Georgia offense for the entire first half.

The Gators added another touchdown before halftime, when Chris Leak threw a 40-yard touchdown pass to Caldwell for his second touchdown of the game. Florida's defense again came up huge in the second half, when on the first play of the half, Georgia tailback Kregg Lumpkin fumbled the ball and defensive tackle Ray McDonald recovered the fumble and returned it for a touchdown, giving the Gators a commanding 21–0 lead.

Florida's defense continued to stifle Georgia throughout the second half, until late in the third quarter. After a Leak interception, true freshman quarterback Matthew Stafford led the Bulldogs to a touchdown which he capped off on a 13-yard touchdown run off a quarterback draw, cutting the deficit to fourteen points. Florida's offense was stuffed on the following drive but got a muffed punt by Georgia to regain the ball. However, Florida was unable to capitalize on the turnover, as Chris Hetland again missed a field goal. Georgia was unable to score on the following drive, but freshman Tim Tebow fumbled on Florida's 10-yard line to give Georgia a shot at drawing within seven points. On third down from the 5-yard line, Lumpkin took a draw play and fought his way for a Georgia touchdown to bring the Bulldogs to within seven points. The Gators and the Bulldogs traded possessions, with the Gators getting the ball back with a little over three minutes in the game. Florida needed a first down on third and five to seal their victory and elected to give Caldwell a carry off a reverse. The play was stopped well short, but Georgia was called for a controversial face mask penalty which gave Florida a first down. Running back DeShawn Wynn, who saw limited action in the game, was able to pick up another first down to seal Florida's seventh win of the season. The Gators have now won fifteen of the last eighteen against their hated rivals from Georgia. The win also moved the Gators into fourth place in the BCS rankings.

Scoring summary

| Quarter | Time | Drive | | | Team | Scoring information | Score | |
| Quarter | Time | Plays | Yards | TOP | Team | Scoring information | FLA | UGA |
|---|---|---|---|---|---|---|---|---|
| 1 | 9:11 | 9 | 62 | 5:49 | Florida | Andre Caldwell 12-yard touchdown run, Chris Hetland kick good | 7 | 0 |
| 2 | 9:37 | 1 | 40 | 0:33 | Florida | Andre Caldwell 40-yard touchdown reception from Chris Leak, Chris Hetland kick good | 14 | 0 |
| 3 | 14:28 | | | | Florida | Fumble recovery returned 9 yards for touchdown by Ray McDonald, Chris Hetland kick good | 21 | 0 |
| 3 | 4:40 | 6 | 52 | 2:17 | Georgia | Matthew Stafford 14-yard touchdown run, Andy Bailey kick good | 21 | 7 |
| 4 | 8:17 | 3 | 14 | 0:54 | Georgia | Kregg Lumpkin 8-yard touchdown run, Andy Bailey kick good | 21 | 14 |
| "TOP" = time of possession. For other American football terms, see Glossary of American football. | | | | | | | 21 | 14 |

=== Vanderbilt ===
Florida at Vanderbilt

| Team | 1 | 2 | 3 | 4 | Total |
|---|---|---|---|---|---|
| • Florida | 8 | 7 | 10 | 0 | 25 |
| Vanderbilt | 6 | 0 | 0 | 13 | 19 |

- Date: November 4
- Location: Vanderbilt Stadium, Nashville, Tennessee

The Gators clinched their trip to the SEC Championship Game with a sloppy win over Vanderbilt. Chris Leak struggled throughout the game, going 18 of 25 passing for 237 yards and one touchdown. Leak threw three interceptions, all of which came with the Gators controlling the flow of the game. Florida got very strong play from its defense and special teams, as they were able to block two punts and force an interception.

Before the game, it was announced that star defensive lineman Marcus Thomas was kicked off the team for the remainder of the year. Coach Urban Meyer stated during the game that "Marcus did not meet his responsibilities and obligations to remain on the team."

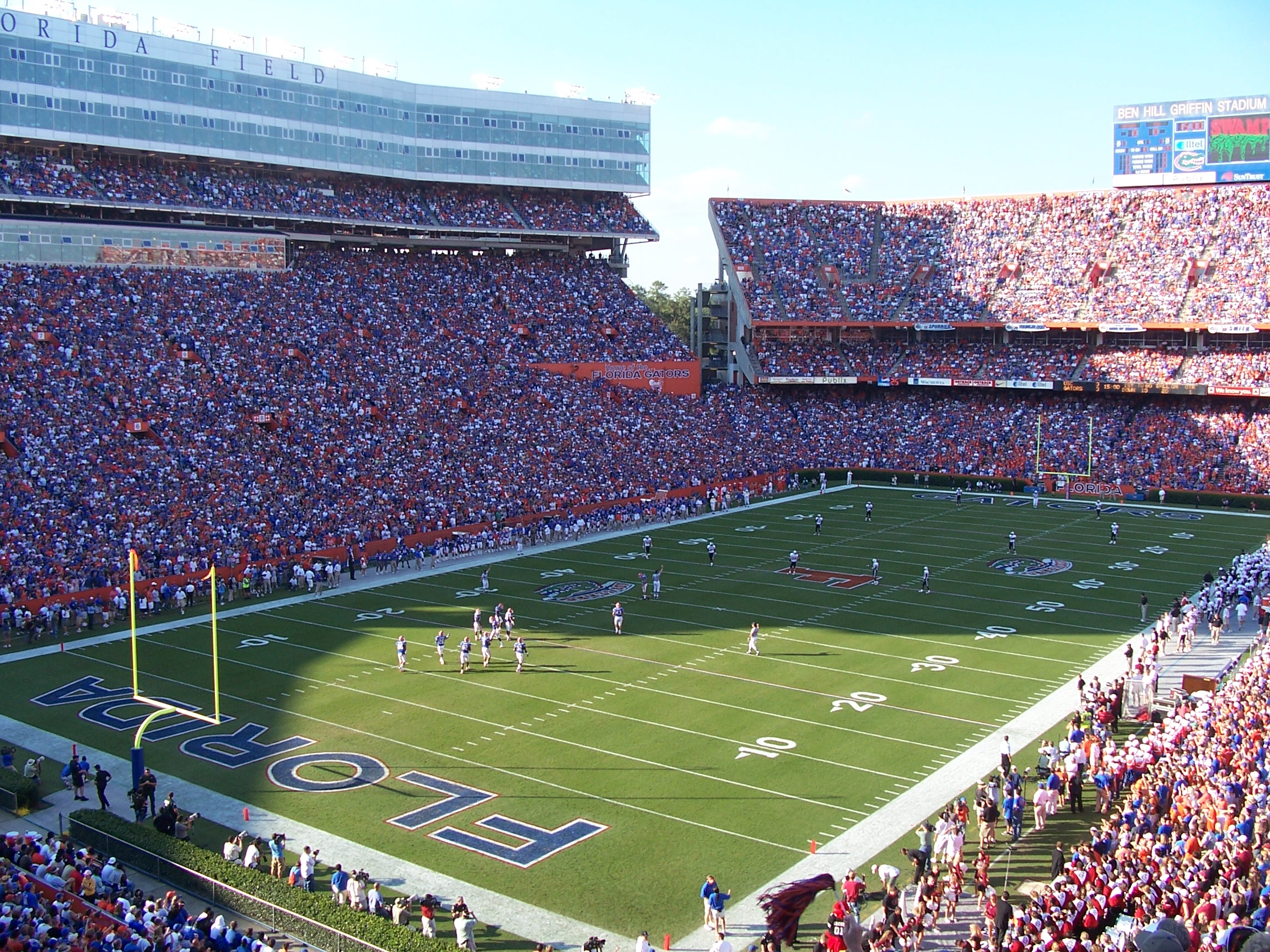
An image from the South Carolina game

=== South Carolina ===
South Carolina at Florida

| Team | 1 | 2 | 3 | 4 | Total |
|---|---|---|---|---|---|
| S. Carolina | 7 | 0 | 0 | 9 | 16 |
| • Florida | 0 | 7 | 0 | 10 | 17 |

- Date: November 11
- Location: Ben Hill Griffin Stadium, Gainesville, Florida

In one of the most anticipated games of the season, former Gator head coach and current Florida quality control assistant Steve Spurrier returned to The Swamp as South Carolina's head coach. Spurrier had made two well-received public visits to the stadium earlier in the year as a part of the national championship anniversary celebration and to be enshrined in the Gators' Ring of Honor.

In a game, lineman Jarvis Moss blocked an extra point and a potential game winning 48-yard field goal with only eight seconds remaining in the game to ensure a Gator victory. Ray McDonald also notably blocked a field goal earlier in the game.

Leading the Gators on offense was Chris Leak, who with 258 yards passing in the game, eclipsed Danny Wuerffel as the All-Time passing yards leader in Gators history. DeShawn Wynn added 86 yards on the ground to help the Gators maintain a steady attack. Freshman Tim Tebow continued his strong season, rushing for a 13-yard touchdown which proved to be the game winning score. Tebow also converted a critical fourth down play inside Gator territory. Kicker Chris Hetland continued to struggle, missing a 28-yard field goal. He did, however, kick a 22-yard field goal.

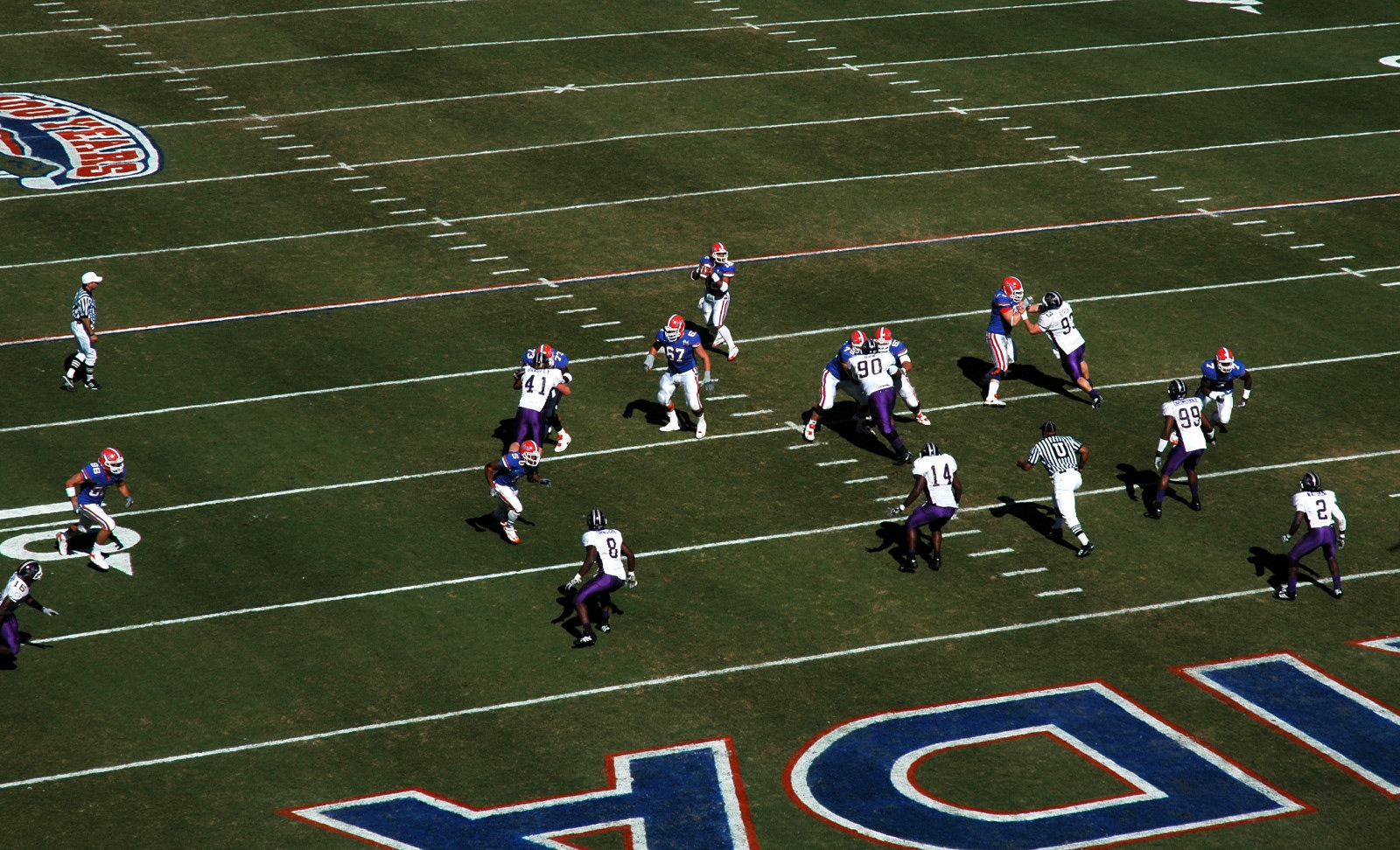
The Florida Gators take on the Western Carolina Catamounts.

=== Western Carolina ===
Western Carolina at Florida

| Team | 1 | 2 | 3 | 4 | Total |
|---|---|---|---|---|---|
| W. Carolina | 0 | 0 | 0 | 0 | 0 |
| • Florida | 14 | 20 | 14 | 14 | 62 |

- Date: November 18
- Location: Ben Hill Griffin Stadium, Gainesville, Florida

The third-ranked Gators had little trouble disposing of the 1-AA Western Carolina Catamounts 62–0. Chris Leak, who played in his final game at The Swamp, went 9–12 for 98 yards and one touchdown in the first half.

Freshman Tim Tebow took over for the majority of the second half, going 10–12 passing, for 200 yards, and two touchdowns. Tebow added two touchdowns rushing along with 47 yards.

The Gators used the game to give young players some playing time. A slew of freshmen played, including Jarred Fayson, who saw time at quarterback and wide receiver. Riley Cooper, yet another freshman, added three receiving touchdowns in the game. Freshman Mon Williams rushed for 97 yards on nine carries. Brandon James also added a 77-yard touchdown from a punt return. Overall, the Gators finished with more points(62) than the Catamounts had yards (59).

=== Florida State ===
Florida at Florida State

| Team | 1 | 2 | 3 | 4 | Total |
|---|---|---|---|---|---|
| • Florida | 7 | 7 | 0 | 7 | 21 |
| FSU | 0 | 0 | 7 | 7 | 14 |

- Date: November 25
- Location: Doak Campbell Stadium, Tallahassee, Florida

To beat the struggling Florida State Seminoles, Chris Leak threw for 283 yards and two touchdowns, Percy Harvin ran for a score and the fourth-ranked Gators won 21–14 on Saturday to stay in the national title hunt.

Florida (11–1) won its third straight against Florida State and improved to 6–0 against its three main rivals—Tennessee, Georgia and Florida State—in Meyer's two seasons.

The victory did not help much in the Bowl Championship Series standings, leaving the Gators looking for assistance to get to the title game, which would come the following weekend.

=== Arkansas ===
SEC Championship

| Team | 1 | 2 | 3 | 4 | Total |
|---|---|---|---|---|---|
| Arkansas | 0 | 7 | 14 | 7 | 28 |
| • Florida | 3 | 14 | 7 | 14 | 38 |

- Date: December 2
- Location: Georgia Dome, Atlanta
- Game start: 6:00 p.m. EST
- Television network: CBS

Scoring summary
| 1 | 6:10 | FLA | Chris Hetland 33-yard field goal | FLA 3-0 |
| 2 | 8:54 | FLA | Chris Leak 9-yard run (Chris Hetland kick) | FLA 10-0 |
| 2 | 4:02 | FLA | Percy Harvin 37-yard pass from Chris Leak (Chris Hetland kick) | FLA 17-0 |
| 2 | 1:55 | ARK | Marcus Monk 48-yard pass from Casey Dick (Jeremy Davis kick) | FLA 17-7 |
| 3 | 12:06 | ARK | Felix Jones 2-yard pass from Darren McFadden (Jeremy Davis kick) | FLA 17-14 |
| 3 | 8:33 | ARK | Antwain Robinson 40-yard interception return (Jeremy Davis kick) | ARK 21-17 |
| 3 | 3:47 | FLA | Wondy Pierre-Louis recovered blocked punt in end zone (Chris Hetland kick) | FLA 24-21 |
| 4 | 14:22 | FLA | Percy Harvin 67-yard run (Chris Hetland kick) | FLA 31-21 |
| 4 | 12:29 | ARK | Felix Jones 29-yard pass from Cedric Washington (Jeremy Davis kick) | FLA 31-28 |
| 4 | 9:04 | FLA | Tate Casey 5-yard pass from Andre Caldwell (Chris Hetland kick) | FLA 38-28 |

The fourth ranked Gators took on the eighth ranked Arkansas Razorbacks in the 2006 SEC Championship Game. Both teams were looking to end their respective SEC Championship droughts, with Florida having not won the title since 2000, and the Razorbacks losing in their previous two title game appearances. The Gators came into the game favored by three points. Both teams traded three and outs before Florida exploded in the second quarter. Up 3–0, Chris Leak called a rare quarterback draw which he converted by fighting into the endzone, giving the Gators a 10–0 lead. On the next Florida drive, Leak found game MVP Percy Harvin on a perfectly thrown 37-yard touchdown pass. However, the Razorbacks came back with a touchdown of their own. Razorbacks quarterback Casey Dick, who had struggled mightily in the past few games, threw a perfect pass to Marcus Monk who caught the pass for a 47-yard touchdown. The Gators led 17–7 heading into the half.

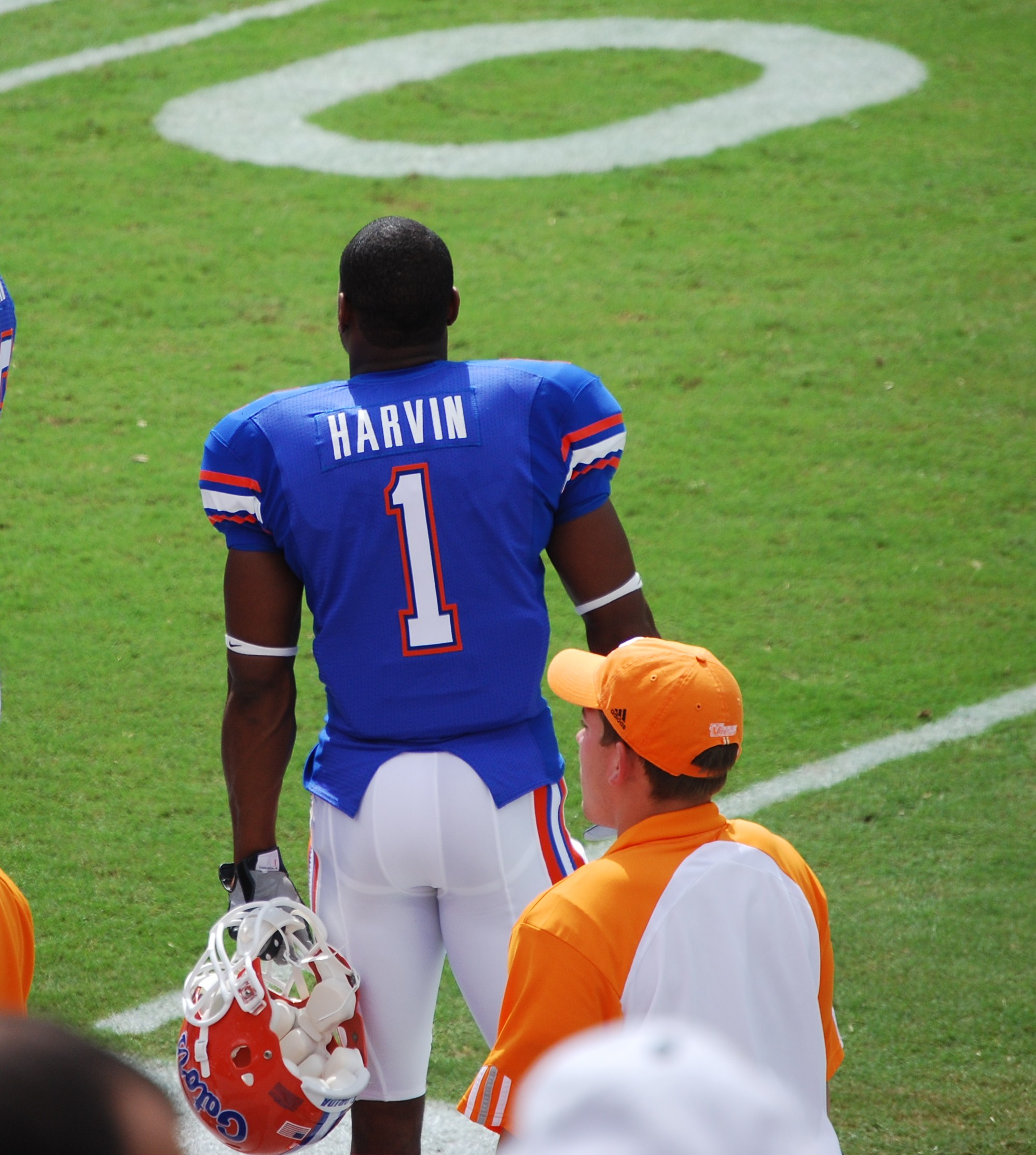
Percy Harvin in 2007

At halftime, in a stunning development, the second-ranked USC Trojans lost in a shocking upset to rival UCLA. With this turn of events, Florida could give themselves a strong chance to overtake No. 2 Michigan and play in the BCS National Championship Game with a win. However, Arkansas came out firing in the second half. Using the unusual "Wildcat Formation", All American tailback Darren McFadden threw a quick two-yard touchdown to fellow tailback Felix Jones. On the next offensive series, Leak was intercepted on an attempted shovel pass which was returned by Antwain Robinson for a touchdown, giving the Razorbacks a stunning 21–17 lead. Florida regained the ball but was stuffed by the Arkansas defense. Coach Urban Meyer decided to run a fake punt on his own 15-yard line, which proved to be a good call, as receiver Jemalle Cornelius scampered for a 16-yard gain. Even with this swing of momentum, the Gators were unable to capitalize and elected to punt from midfield. The momentum changed yet again, this time in Florida's favor. Arkansas punt returner Reggie Fish muffed the punt after trying to field it over his shoulder; the ball was recovered in the endzone by Gator freshman Wondy Pierre-Louis, giving the Gators a 24–21 lead.

The Gators took the three-point lead into the fourth quarter knowing with a win, they will have made their case to play in the BCS National Championship Game. Harvin gave Florida a ten-point lead when he bolted through the Arkansas defense for a 67-yard touchdown. On the following Arkansas offensive series, the momentum of the game appeared to change yet again, when receiver Cedric Washington threw a 29-yard touchdown pass to Jones on another trick play.

Knowing the field goal lead wouldn't be enough, the Gators came out firing on their offensive series. Florida drove to the Arkansas five-yard line, when freshman sensation Tim Tebow came into the game. Tebow appeared to be running yet again, but he pitched the ball to wide receiver Andre Caldwell who then threw a touchdown pass to tight end Tate Casey which proved to give the Gators a big enough lead to win their first conference championship in six years.

The victory catapulted the Gators over second ranked Michigan in the BCS standings, giving the Gators the right to play Ohio State in the BCS National Championship Game.

=== Ohio State ===
BCS National Championship

| Team | 1 | 2 | 3 | 4 | Total |
|---|---|---|---|---|---|
| • Florida | 14 | 20 | 0 | 7 | 41 |
| Ohio State | 7 | 7 | 0 | 0 | 14 |

- Date: January 8
- Location: University of Phoenix Stadium, Glendale, Arizona
- Game start: 8:00 p.m. EST
- Television network: Fox

Scoring summary
| 1 | 14:44 | OSU | Ted Ginn Jr. 93-yard kickoff return (Aaron Pettrey kick) | OSU 7-0 |
| 1 | 10:31 | FLA | Dallas Baker 14-yard pass from Chris Leak (Chris Hetland kick) | Tied 7-7 |
| 1 | 5:51 | FLA | Percy Harvin 4-yard run (Chris Hetland kick) | FLA 14-7 |
| 2 | 14:56 | FLA | DeShawn Wynn 2-yard run (Chris Hetland kick) | FLA 21-7 |
| 2 | 13:32 | OSU | Antonio Pittman 18-yard run (Aaron Pettrey kick) | FLA 21-14 |
| 2 | 6:00 | FLA | Chris Hetland 42-yard field goal | FLA 24-14 |
| 2 | 1:53 | FLA | Chris Hetland 40-yard field goal | FLA 27-14 |
| 2 | 0:23 | FLA | Andre Caldwell 1-yard pass from Tim Tebow (Chris Hetland kick) | FLA 34-14 |
| 4 | 10:20 | FLA | Tim Tebow 1-yard run (Chris Hetland kick) | FLA 41-14 |

The Florida Gators ended their season with a stunning 41–14 upset of the number one ranked Ohio State Buckeyes, giving them the school's second national championship in ten years.

The game did not start well for the Gators, however. Florida won the toss and elected to defer the option to the second half, giving Ohio State the ball first. On the opening kickoff, Ted Ginn Jr. sprinted for a 93-yard kickoff return for a touchdown, turning the largely Ohio State crowd into a frenzy and giving the Buckeyes a 7–0 lead 16 seconds into the game. However, Ginn injured his foot celebrating the touchdown, leaving the Buckeyes without his deep threat for the rest of the game.

Coach Urban Meyer, who was coaching in his first national championship game, took a timeout to compose his team after the inauspicious start. It appeared to work, as senior Chris Leak went 5–5 on the first drive of the game. Leak found three different receivers on the drive, which culminated with a lob pass to fellow senior Dallas Baker.

The Buckeyes then got their first offensive possession of the game. Led by Heisman Trophy winner Troy Smith, the Buckeye offense was widely considered to be the best offense in college football. The Gators, however, had one of the top defenses in the nation. The Gators blitzed Smith multiple times on the first drive, leading to a three and out, forcing Ohio State to punt.

Florida had great field position, following a personal foul penalty on Ohio State. Leak led the Gators back on the field, starting from the Ohio State 35-yard line. Florida again used a variety of offensive looks to keep the Ohio State defense off balance, which also included using freshman phenom Tim Tebow as a power rusher. On second down and goal, from the Ohio State four-yard line, Florida ran an option play, in which Leak pitched the ball to freshman star Percy Harvin who fought his way in for a four-yard touchdown. Harvin appeared to be down at the one-yard line, but after further review, it was determined that Harvin did reach the endzone. The score gave the Gators a surprising 14–7 lead.

The Buckeyes came back on their next possession, trailing by a touchdown. Still, the Gator defense managed to put Smith under heavy pressure. On third down, following a sack, the Gators blitzed, hit Smith as he threw the ball, and cornerback Reggie Lewis intercepted the pass.

Following the interception, the Gators continued to use unorthodox formations and plays to keep Ohio State off balance. Leak remained extremely sharp, going four of five passing on the drive, for 44 yards. On the Ohio State 7-yard line, Tebow came into the game and powered his way to the Buckeye 2-yard line. On the following play, running back DeShawn Wynn rumbled in for a two-yard touchdown, giving the Gators a stunning 21–7 lead.

The Buckeyes however, remained composed. Using their power running game, and a 13-yard scramble from Smith, the Buckeyes drove to the Gators' 18-yard line. Tailback Antonio Pittman weaved through the Gators' defense on the next play, for an 18-yard touchdown run, pulling the Buckeyes to within a touchdown.

Florida moved the ball with some success on their next possession but were held for the first time all night by the Ohio State defense, forcing a Florida punt. Smith and the Buckeyes marched back on the field, hoping to tie the game. However, Florida's stifling defensive line continued to put heavy pressure on Smith, forcing bad throws and incompletions, ultimately leading to a three and out.

The Gators got the football back, hoping to restore their two-touchdown lead. Florida did move the ball successfully but was unable to move the ball inside the redzone. Much to the displeasure of many Gator fans, Florida elected to send kicker Chris Hetland on to attempt a 40-yard field goal. Hetland had missed 9 of 13 attempts on the season, but split the uprights, giving the Gators a 24–14 lead.

Ohio State was now in a deep hole, trailing by ten with six minutes to go in the half. The Buckeyes attempted to establish a power running game with Pittman and Chris Wells, but the Gator defense was up to the task. In perhaps one of the most stunning decisions of the game, Buckeyes coach Jim Tressel decided to go for it on fourth and 1 from his own 29. The decision backfired, and Wells was stopped short of the first down, giving the Gators great field position.

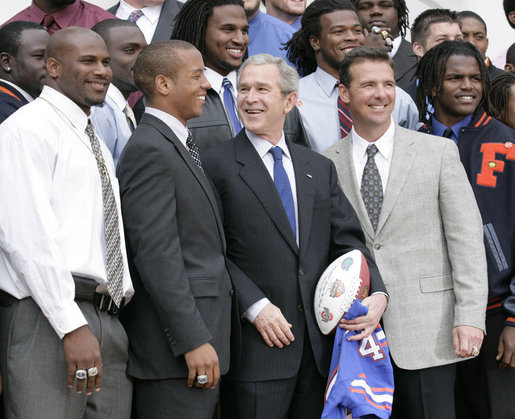
The team is honored as BCS champions by President George W. Bush at the White House.

With the swing in momentum, the Gators were again unable to score a touchdown and settled for another Hetland 40-yard field goal, pushing the Gator lead to 27–14. The game changed for good, on the next Ohio State possession. Under extreme pressure yet again, Smith attempted to scramble outside of the pocket, but was caught by defensive end and special teams hero Jarvis Moss, who stripped Smith of the football. Defensive game MVP Derrick Harvey recovered the fumble and returned it for 9 yards, to the Ohio State five-yard line. After two Tebow runs up the middle, Florida faced a third down and goal on the Ohio State one-yard line. Florida used a timeout to draw up a play for Tebow, who remained in the game. Tebow faked his usual quarterback run up the middle, ran left and flipped an easy one-yard touchdown pass to a wide open Andre Caldwell. This score gave the Gators a shocking 34–14 halftime lead.

Leading 34–14 heading into the third quarter, the Gators appeared to be conservative on offense, which resulted in a quick three and out on the first possession of the half. The Gator defense, however, remained their brilliant play, in suffocating Smith and pressuring him relentlessly and forcing him into bad decisions. The teams traded three and outs, and punts, throughout the third quarter, which gave the Gators a 20-point lead heading into the fourth quarter.

Fifteen minutes from a national championship, the Gators were determined not to have a defensive lapse, like many had so often seen under former coach Ron Zook. The Gators again continued their relentless pressure on Smith, sacking him several times, and pressuring him into bad throws.

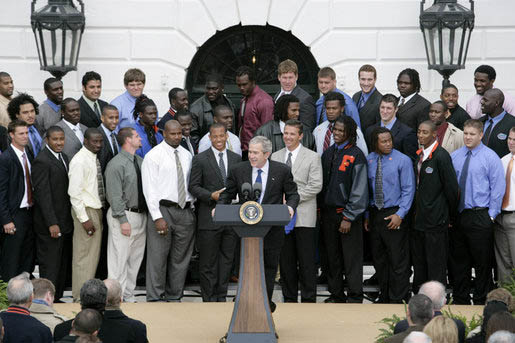
The Florida football team celebrating their championships at the White House with President Bush

On their next offensive possession, the Gators were determined to put the game out of reach. Urban Meyer again used a balanced attack of rushing and passing to drive the Gators down to the Ohio State one-yard line. Faced with a fourth-and-goal on the Ohio State 1-yard line, many fans knew what was coming. Tebow was again brought into the game and powered his way off the right side for a touchdown, giving the Gators a commanding 41–14 lead.

Troy Smith continued to have the worst game of his Buckeye career, as he was sacked for a 14-yard loss on the drive, putting Ohio State into a 3rd and 29-hole. Ohio State ran a draw play on 3rd down and punted on the following play.

With eight minutes remaining in the game, the Gators were determined to end the game and give the school a national championship. Wynn, who was in Urban Meyer's doghouse early in Meyer's tenure at Florida, carried the ball 8 times on the drive, picking up several key first downs to keep the clock running. However, Wynn was stopped on a 3rd and 8 play, for only 2 yards. Meyer elected to go for it, and Leak passed to Harvin, who barely made the first down. Knowing this had sealed the win, Meyer began pumping his fist, and gesturing the Florida crowd to get noisy. Leak took a final knee on fourth down, ending his illustrious career as a Gator on top of the college football world. Leak would later be named the game's most valuable player.

With the Gators winning the 2007 national championship in men's basketball three months later (coincidentally beating Ohio State), the University of Florida holds the distinction of being the only school to ever hold both the unshared men's basketball national championship and unshared football championship in the same academic year (2006–07) and in the same calendar year (2007).

== Awards and honors ==
=== Associated Press All-SEC ===
All-SEC First Team
- Reggie Nelson, DB
- Ryan Smith, CB

All-SEC Second Team
- Earl Everett, LB
- Brandon Siler, LB

SEC Freshman of the Year
- Percy Harvin, WR

==== Coaches All-SEC ====
All-SEC First Team
- Steve Rissler, C
- Dallas Baker, WR
- Ray McDonald, DT
- Earl Everett, LB
- Reggie Nelson, DB

All-SEC Second Team
- Drew Miller, OL
- Phil Trautwein, OL
- Chris Leak, QB
- Derrick Harvey, DE
- Brandon Siler, LB
- Ryan Smith, CB

SEC Freshman of the Year:
- Percy Harvin, WR

Freshman All-SEC Team
- Percy Harvin, WR
- Brandon James, KR
- Tim Tebow, QB

=== AP All-America ===
- All-America First Team: Reggie Nelson, FS
- All-America Second Team: Ryan Smith, CB
- All-America Third Team: Brandon Siler, LB

=== First-round draft picks ===
- Reggie Nelson, 21st pick to Jacksonville Jaguars
- Jarvis Moss, 17th pick to Denver Broncos

== Personnel ==
=== Coaching staff ===
- Urban Meyer – head coach – 1 year at UF
- Steve Addazio – Tackles/tight ends – 1 year
- Stan Drayton – Running backs – 1 year
- Billy Gonzales – Wide receivers – 1 year
- Chuck Heater – Recruiting coordinator/cornerbacks – 1 year
- John Hevesy – Centers/guards – 1 year
- John "Doc" Holliday – Associate head coach/safeties – 1 year
- Greg Mattison – Co-defensive coordinator/defensive line – 1 year
- Dan Mullen – Offensive coordinator/quarterbacks – 1 year
- Charlie Strong – Assistant head coach/co-defensive coordinator/linebackers – 6 years

=== Roster ===
2006 Florida Gators roster
| Quarterbacks: 3 Michael Guilford – Freshman; 4 Matt Anderson – Freshman; 12 Chris Leak – Senior; 14 Andrew Blaylock – Freshman; 15 Tim Tebow – Freshman; 16 Butch Rowley – (redshirt) Sophomore; Running backs: 2 Markus Manson – (redshirt) Sophomore; 21 DeShawn Wynn – (redshirt) Senior; 25 Brandon James – Freshman; 27 Mon Williams – Freshman; 28 Chevon Walker – Freshman; 33 Kestahn Moore – Sophomore; H-Backs: 29 Eric Rutledge – Junior; 42 Billy Latsko – (redshirt) Senior; Fullbacks: 45 Bo Howard – Freshman; 49 Andrew Johnson – (redshirt) Freshman; Wide receivers: 5 Andre Caldwell – (redshirt) Junior; 6 Jemalle Cornelius – (redshirt) Senior; 8 Percy Harvin – Freshman; 9 Kenneth Tookes – (redshirt) Senior; 11 Jarred Fayson – Freshman; 17 Nyan Boateng – Sophomore; 23 Cade Holliday – (redshirt) Freshman; 37 Tim Higgins – Senior; 39 Joey Sorrentino – (redshirt) Freshman; 81 Dallas Baker – (redshirt) Senior; 82 Louis Murphy – Sophomore; 83 David Nelson – (redshirt) Freshman; 86 Riley Cooper – Freshman; 87 Justin Williams – Freshman; 88 Cam Brewer – Sophomore | Tight ends: 7 Cornelius Ingram – (redshirt) Sophomore; 80 Trent Pupello – Freshman; 84 Tate Casey – Junior; 89 Derek Baldry – (redshirt) Sophomore; Offensive line: 57 Carl Johnson – Freshman; 63 Jim Tartt – (redshirt) Sophomore; 64 Kyle Newell – (redshirt) Freshman; 65 Brad Heirs – (redshirt) Freshman; 67 Drew Miller – Junior; 68 Jim Barrie – (redshirt) Freshman; 69 Eddie Haupt – (redshirt) Freshman; 70 Ronnie Wilson – (redshirt) Freshman; 71 Corey Hobbs – Freshman; 73 Carlton Medder – (redshirt) Junior; 74 Maurice Hurt – Freshman; 75 Phil Trautwein – Junior; 76 Marcus Gilbert – Freshman; 77 Jason Watkins – (redshirt) Sophomore; 78 Simon Codrington – (redshirt) Freshman; 79 Steve Rissler – Senior; Defensive line: 20 Joe Cohen – Senior; 47 Brandon Antwine – Freshman; 48 Javier Estopiñan – (redshirt) Sophomore; 49 Jermaine Cunningham – Freshman; 52 Darryl Gresham Jr. – (redshirt) Freshman; 59 John Fairbanks – Freshman; 61 Vernon Shelton – (redshirt) Sophomore; 90 Lawrence Marsh – Freshman; 91 Derrick Harvey – (redshirt) Sophomore; 92 Terron Sanders – Freshman; 93 Steven Harris – (redshirt) Senior; 94 Jarvis Moss – (redshirt) Junior; 95 Ray McDonald – (redshirt) Senior; 98 Clint McMillan – (redshirt) Junior; 99 Lutrell Alford – Junior | Linebackers: 13 Brian Crum – (redshirt) Senior; 16 A.J. Jones – Freshman; 30 Earl Everett – Senior; 32 Dustin Doe – Freshman; 35 Eric Sledge – (redshirt) Freshman; 40 Brandon Siler – Junior; 41 Ryan Stamper – (redshirt) Freshman; 50 Chris Pintado – Freshman; 51 Brandon Spikes – Freshman; 53 Jamaal Deveaux – (redshirt) Freshman; 54 Roderick Blackett – (redshirt) Freshman; 55 Jon Demps – Sophomore; 56 Darryon Robinson – Senior; 45 Harold Pryor, Jr.- "Sophomore"; Defensive backs: 1 Reggie Nelson – Junior; 27 Telly Concepcion - (redshirt) Sophomore; 42 Miguel Carodine – Freshman; Cornerbacks: 4 Wondy Pierre-Louis – Freshman; 18 Tremaine McCollum – (redshirt) Senior; 22 Reggie Lewis – (redshirt) Senior; 23 Jacques Rickerson – Freshman; 26 Jermaine McCollum – (redshirt) Senior; 28 Ryan Smith – Junior; 33 Moise Paul – (redshirt) Junior; 34 Lamont Sheppard – (redshirt) Sophomore; 36 Nick Brooks – (redshirt) Senior; 37 Markihe Anderson – Freshman | Safeties: 3 Kyle Jackson – Junior; 7 Jamar Hornsby – Freshman; 12 Cody Worton – Freshman; 17 Curtis Carr – Sophomore; 19 Tony Joiner – Junior; 24 John Curtis – (redshirt) Sophomore; 31 Bryan Thomas – Freshman; 34 Dorian Munroe – (redshirt) Freshman; Punters: 10 Eric Wilbur – Senior; Placekickers: 14 Eric Nappy – (redshirt) Senior; 38 Jonathan Phillips – Sophomore; 39 Chris Hetland – (redshirt) Senior; 85 Andrew Fritze – (redshirt) Freshman; 92 Bobby Kane – (redshirt) Freshman; 98 Joey Ijjas – (redshirt) Junior; Long snappers: 16 Butch Rowley – (redshirt) Sophomore; 43 James Smith – (redshirt) Sophomore; 58 Mike Williamson – (redshirt) Freshman |

=== Depth chart ===
Offense

| WR | WR |
|---|---|
| Jemalle Cornelius | Andre Caldwell |
| Percy Harvin | Louis Murphy |

| LT | LG | C | RG | RT |
|---|---|---|---|---|
| Phil Trautwein | Jim Tartt | Steve Rissler | Drew Miller | Carlton Medder |
| Ronnie Wilson | Maurice Hurt | Eddie Haupt | Simon Codrington | Jason Watkins |

TE
Tate Casey
Cornelius Ingram

WR
Dallas Baker
Kenneth Tookes

QB
Chris Leak
Tim Tebow

TB
DeShawn Wynn
Kestahn Moore

FB
Billy Latsko
Eric Rutledge

Defense

CB
Reggie Lewis
Markihe Anderson

FS
Reggie Nelson
Kyle Jackson

| DE | DT | DT | DE |
|---|---|---|---|
| Derrick Harvey | Ray McDonald | Steven Harris | Jarvis Moss |
| Ray McDonald | Joe Cohen | Javier Estopiñan | Joe Cohen |

| Will LB | Middle LB | Sam LB |
|---|---|---|
| Earl Everett | Brandon Siler | Brian Crum |
| Ryan Stamper | Brandon Spikes | Jon Demps |

CB
Ryan Smith
Tremaine McCollum

SS
Tony Joiner
Dorian Munroe

== Team statistics ==
| | UF | OPP |
|---|---|---|
| Scoring | 416 | 189 |
| Points per game | 29.7 | 13.5 |
| First downs | 285 | 216 |
| Rushing | 117 | 81 |
| Passing | 152 | 114 |
| Penalty | 16 | 21 |
| Total offense | 5,545 | 3,576 |
| Avg per play | 6.3 | 4.3 |
| Avg per game | 396.1 | 255.4 |
| Fumbles-lost | 25–10 | 21–8 |
| Penalties-yards | 116–888 | 81–595 |
| Avg per game | 63.4 | 42.5 |

| | UF | OPP |
|---|---|---|
| Punts-yards | 55–2,244 | 77–2,904 |
| Avg per punt | 40.8 | 37.7 |
| Time of possession/game | 31:08 | 28:49 |
| 3rd down conversions | 74/167 | 61/186 |
| 4th down conversions | 9/18 | 6/18 |
| Touchdowns scored | 57 | 23 |
| Field goals-attempts | 6–15 | 10–19 |
| PAT-attempts | 50–54 | 19–20 |
| Attendance | 632,866 | 316,000 |
| Games/avg per game | 7/90,409 | 4/79,000 |
| Neutral site games | 3/77,525 | |

=== Scores by quarter ===
| | 1 | 2 | 3 | 4 | Total |
|---|---|---|---|---|---|
| Opponents | 47 | 39 | 42 | 61 | 189 |
| Gators | 90 | 150 | 83 | 93 | 416 |

== Player statistics ==
=== Offense ===
==== Rushing ====
| Name | # | GP | Att | Gain | Loss | Net | Avg | TD | Long | Avg/G |
|---|---|---|---|---|---|---|---|---|---|---|
| Wynn, D. | 21 | 14 | 143 | 721 | 22 | 699 | 4.9 | 6 | 26 | 49.9 |
| Tebow, T. | 15 | 14 | 89 | 478 | 9 | 469 | 5.3 | 8 | 29 | 33.5 |
| Harvin, P. | 8 | 13 | 41 | 437 | 9 | 428 | 10.4 | 3 | 67 | 32.9 |
| Moore, K. | 33 | 14 | 54 | 289 | 7 | 282 | 5.2 | 2 | 28 | 20.1 |
| Fayson, J. | 11 | 13 | 14 | 126 | 0 | 126 | 9.0 | 1 | 27 | 9.7 |
| Caldwell, A. | 5 | 14 | 21 | 126 | 24 | 102 | 4.9 | 1 | 27 | 7.3 |
| Williams, M. | 27 | 8 | 13 | 101 | 0 | 101 | 7.8 | 0 | 25 | 12.6 |
| Leak, C. | 12 | 14 | 77 | 238 | 208 | 30 | 0.4 | 3 | 45 | 2.1 |
| Cornelius, J. | 7 | 14 | 4 | 27 | 7 | 20 | 5.0 | 0 | 17 | 1.4 |
| Manson, M. | 2 | 12 | 4 | 17 | 2 | 15 | 3.8 | 0 | 9 | 1.2 |
| Rowley, B. | 16 | 14 | 1 | 3 | 0 | 3 | 3.0 | 0 | 3 | 0.2 |
| James, B. | 25 | 13 | 3 | 4 | 3 | 1 | 0.3 | 0 | 4 | 0.1 |
| Higgins, T. | 37 | 1 | 1 | 0 | 0 | 0 | 0.0 | 0 | 0 | 0.0 |
| Wilbur, E. | 10 | 13 | 1 | 0 | 2 | –2 | –2.0 | 0 | 0 | –0.2 |
| Team Total | | 14 | 476 | 2,567 | 327 | 2,240 | 4.7 | 24 | 67 | 160.0 |

==== Passing ====
| Name | # | GP | Effic | Cmp-Atm-Int | Pct | Yds | TD | Lng | Avg/G |
|---|---|---|---|---|---|---|---|---|---|
| Leak, C. | 12 | 14 | 144.94 | 232–365–13 | 63.6 | 2,942 | 23 | 66 | 210.1 |
| Tebow, T. | 15 | 14 | 201.73 | 22–33–1 | 66.7 | 358 | 5 | 55 | 25.6 |
| Caldwell, A. | 5 | 14 | 472.00 | 1–1–0 | 100.0 | 5 | 1 | 5 | 0.4 |
| Team Total | | 14 | 150.46 | 255–399–14 | 63.9 | 3,305 | 29 | 66 | 236.1 |

==== Receiving ====
| Name | # | GP | No. | Yds | Avg | TD | Long | Avg/G |
|---|---|---|---|---|---|---|---|---|
| Baker, D. | 81 | 14 | 60 | 920 | 15.3 | 10 | 33 | 65.7 |
| Caldwell, A. | 5 | 14 | 57 | 577 | 10.1 | 6 | 66 | 41.2 |
| Cornelius, J. | 6 | 14 | 34 | 523 | 15.4 | 3 | 34 | 37.4 |
| Harvin, P. | 8 | 13 | 34 | 427 | 12.6 | 2 | 58 | 32.8 |
| Ingram, C. | 7 | 14 | 30 | 380 | 12.7 | 1 | 38 | 27.1 |
| Moore, K. | 33 | 14 | 8 | 58 | 7.2 | 1 | 16 | 4.1 |
| Casey, T. | 84 | 14 | 6 | 58 | 9.7 | 2 | 22 | 4.1 |
| Wynn, D. | 21 | 14 | 6 | 58 | 9.7 | 0 | 15 | 4.1 |
| Nelson, D. | 83 | 4 | 5 | 76 | 15.2 | 0 | 23 | 19.0 |
| Cooper, R. | 86 | 13 | 4 | 92 | 23.0 | 3 | 55 | 7.1 |
| Tookes, K. | 9 | 13 | 4 | 55 | 13.8 | 0 | 20 | 4.2 |
| Latsko, B. | 42 | 14 | 4 | 38 | 9.5 | 0 | 18 | 2.7 |
| Murphy, L. | 82 | 12 | 2 | 42 | 21.0 | 1 | 35 | 3.5 |
| Total | | 14 | 255 | 3,305 | 13.0 | 29 | 66 | 236.1 |

=== Defense ===
| Name | # | GP | Tackles | | | | Sacks | Pass defense | | | | Fumbles | | | |
| Name | # | GP | Solo | Ast | Total | TFL-Yds | No-Yds | BrUp | QBH | Int.-Yds | TD | Rcv-Yds | FF | Blkd Kick | Saf |
|---|---|---|---|---|---|---|---|---|---|---|---|---|---|---|---|
| Everett, E. | 30 | 13 | 50 | 35 | 85 | 6.0–11 | 1.0–5 | 2 | 4 | | | | | | |
| Siler, B. | 40 | 13 | 50 | 27 | 77 | 10.0–40 | 3.0–21 | 3 | 3 | | | 1–0 | 1 | | |
| Joiner, T. | 19 | 14 | 31 | 28 | 59 | 4.5–9 | | 6 | | 2–0 | | | 1 | | 1 |
| Moss, J. | 94 | 13 | 42 | 14 | 56 | 11.0–68 | 7.5–60 | 4 | 12 | | | | 4 | 2 | |
| Smith, R. | 28 | 14 | 43 | 11 | 54 | 3.5–11 | | 8 | | 8–44 | | | | 2 | |
| Nelson, R. | 1 | 14 | 34 | 17 | 51 | 2.0–6 | | 5 | | 6–70 | 1 | 1–0 | | 2 | |
| McDonald, R. | 95 | 14 | 19 | 17 | 36 | 4.5–16 | 3.0–15 | 5 | 2 | | | 1–9 1TD | | 1 | |
| Harvey, D. | 91 | 14 | 24 | 11 | 35 | 13.0–95 | 11.0–89 | | 8 | | | 3–9 | 1 | | |
| Crum, B. | 13 | 14 | 13 | 18 | 31 | 3.0–7 | 0.5–4 | 1 | 1 | | | | | | |
| Lewis, R. | 22 | 14 | 18 | 9 | 27 | 1.5–3 | | 6 | 1 | 4-35 | | | | | |
| McCollum, T. | 18 | 14 | 16 | 10 | 26 | | | 1 | 1 | 1–1 | | | | | |
| Cohen, J. | 20 | 14 | 10 | 16 | 26 | 2.0–11 | 0.5–8 | 1 | 1 | | | | 1 | | |
| Thomas, M. | 44 | 5 | 13 | 13 | 26 | 5.5–32 | 4.0–31 | 1 | | | | | | | |
| Doe, D. | 32 | 14 | 14 | 8 | 22 | 1.0–1 | | | | | | | | | |
| Munroe, D. | 34 | 14 | 11 | 5 | 16 | 1.0–2 | | | | | | | | | |
| Spikes, B. | 51 | 9 | 9 | 6 | 15 | 1.0–2 | | 2 | | | | | | | |
| Harris, S. | 93 | 13 | 6 | 9 | 15 | 4.5–17 | 1.5–11 | 2 | | | | | | | |
| Brooks, N. | 36 | 14 | 8 | 5 | 13 | | | | | | | | | | |
| Jackson, K. | 3 | 14 | 7 | 4 | 11 | | | | | | | | | | |
| Smith, J. | 43 | 14 | 5 | 3 | 8 | | | | | | | | | | |
| Anderson, M. | 37 | 13 | 7 | 1 | 8 | | | 1 | | | | | | | |
| McCollum, J. | 26 | 13 | 4 | 4 | 8 | | | | | | | | | | 1 |
| Pierre-Louis, W. | 4 | 12 | 3 | 4 | 7 | | | | | | | 1–0 1TD | | | |
| Estopinan, J. | 48 | 6 | 1 | 4 | 5 | | | | 1 | | | | | | |
| Antwine, B. | 47 | 8 | 1 | 3 | 4 | | | 1 | | | | | | | |
| Curtis, J. | 24 | 6 | 2 | 2 | 4 | | | 1 | | | | | | | |
| Stamper, R. | 41 | 2 | 3 | 1 | 4 | 1.0–2 | | | | | | | | | |
| Cooper, R. | 86 | 13 | 2 | 2 | 4 | | | | | | | | 1 | | |
| Blackett, R. | 54 | 10 | 3 | 1 | 4 | | | | | | | | | | |
| Robinson, D. | 56 | 13 | 2 | 1 | 3 | 1.0–1 | | | | | | | | | |
| Alford, L. | 99 | 10 | 3 | | 3 | 2.0–9 | 1.0–6 | | | | | 1–0 | | | |
| Murphy, L. | 82 | 12 | 3 | | 3 | | | | | | | | | | |
| Phillips, J. | 38 | 4 | 1 | 1 | 2 | | | | | | | | | | |
| Williams, M. | 27 | 8 | | 2 | 2 | | | | | | | | | | |
| Fritze, A. | 85 | 3 | 2 | | 2 | | | | | | | | | | |
| Ijjas, J. | 98 | 12 | 1 | 1 | 2 | | | | | | | | | | |
| Cunningham, J. | 49 | 7 | 2 | | 2 | | | | | | | | | | |
| McMillan, C. | 98 | 14 | 1 | 1 | 2 | 1.0–8 | 1.0–8 | | | | | | | | |
| Miller, D. | 67 | 14 | 1 | | 1 | | | | | | | | | | |
| Gresham, D. | 52 | 1 | | 1 | 1 | | | | | | | | | | |
| Leak, C. | 12 | 14 | 1 | | 1 | | | | | | | | | | |
| Brewer, C. | 88 | 1 | 1 | | 1 | | | | | | | | | | |
| Fayson, J. | 11 | 13 | 1 | | 1 | | | | | | | | | 1 | |
| Rissler, S. | 79 | 14 | 1 | | 1 | | | | | | | | | | |
| Harvin, P. | 8 | 13 | 1 | | 1 | | | | | | | | | | |
| Baker, D. | 81 | 14 | 1 | | 1 | | | | | | | | | | |
| Total | | 14 | 472 | 295 | 767 | 79–351 | 34–258 | 50 | 34 | 21–150 | 1 | 8–18 2TD | 9 | 8 | 2 |

=== Special teams ===
==== Kicking ====
| Name | # | Punting | | | | | | | | Kicking | | | | | | |
| Name | # | No. | Yds | Avg | Long | TB | FC | I20 | Blkd | No. | Yds | Avg | TB | OB | FG | XP |
|---|---|---|---|---|---|---|---|---|---|---|---|---|---|---|---|---|
| Wilbur, E. | 10 | 53 | 2,244 | 42.3 | 64 | 5 | 12 | 22 | 1 | | | | | | | |
| Ijjas, J. | 98 | | | | | | | | | 65 | 3,755 | 57.8 | 11 | 2 | | |
| Phillips, J. | 38 | | | | | | | | | 13 | 770 | 59.2 | 2 | 0 | | 5–5 |
| Hetland, C. | 39 | | | | | | | | | | | | | | 6–15 | 43–45 |
| Nappy, E. | 14 | | | | | | | | | | | | | | | 2–4 |
| Total | | 55 | 2,244 | 40.8 | 64 | 5 | 12 | 22 | 2 | 78 | 4,525 | 58.0 | 13 | 2 | 6–15 | 50–54 |

==== Returns ====
| Name | # | Punt returns | | | | | Kick returns | | | | |
| Name | # | No. | Yds | Avg | TD | Long | No. | Yds | Avg | TD | Long |
|---|---|---|---|---|---|---|---|---|---|---|---|
| James, B. | 25 | 33 | 363 | 11.0 | 1 | 77 | 21 | 383 | 18.2 | 0 | 38 |
| Nelson, R. | 1 | 12 | 93 | 7.8 | 0 | 21 | | | | | |
| Fayson, J. | 11 | 3 | 30 | 10.0 | 0 | 16 | | | | | |
| Smith, R. | 28 | 1 | 13 | 13.0 | 0 | 13 | | | | | |
| Moore, K. | 33 | | | | | | 4 | 63 | 15.8 | 0 | 26 |
| Cornelius, J. | 6 | | | | | | 1 | 9 | 9.0 | 0 | 9 |
| Total | | 49 | 499 | 10.2 | 1 | 77 | 26 | 455 | 17.5 | 0 | 38 |

== Players drafted into the NFL ==
| Round | Pick | Player | Position | NFL club |
|---|---|---|---|---|
| 1 | 17 | Jarvis Moss | DE | Denver Broncos |
| 1 | 21 | Reggie Nelson | S | Jacksonville Jaguars |
| 3 | 97 | Ray McDonald | DE | San Francisco 49ers |
| 4 | 121 | Marcus Thomas | DT | Denver Broncos |
| 4 | 135 | Joe Cohen | DE | San Francisco 49ers |
| 6 | 206 | Ryan Smith | CB | Tennessee Titans |
| 7 | 227 | Dallas Baker | WR | Pittsburgh Steelers |
| 7 | 228 | DeShawn Wynn | RB | Green Bay Packers |
| 7 | 240 | Brandon Siler | LB | San Diego Chargers |

== Bibliography ==
- 2009 Southeastern Conference Football Media Guide, Florida Year-by-Year Records, Southeastern Conference, Birmingham, Alabama, p. 60 (2009).
- Carlson, Norm, University of Florida Football Vault: The History of the Florida Gators, Whitman Publishing, LLC, Atlanta, Georgia (2007). ISBN 0-7948-2298-3.
