= Derrick Harvey =

American football player (born 1986)

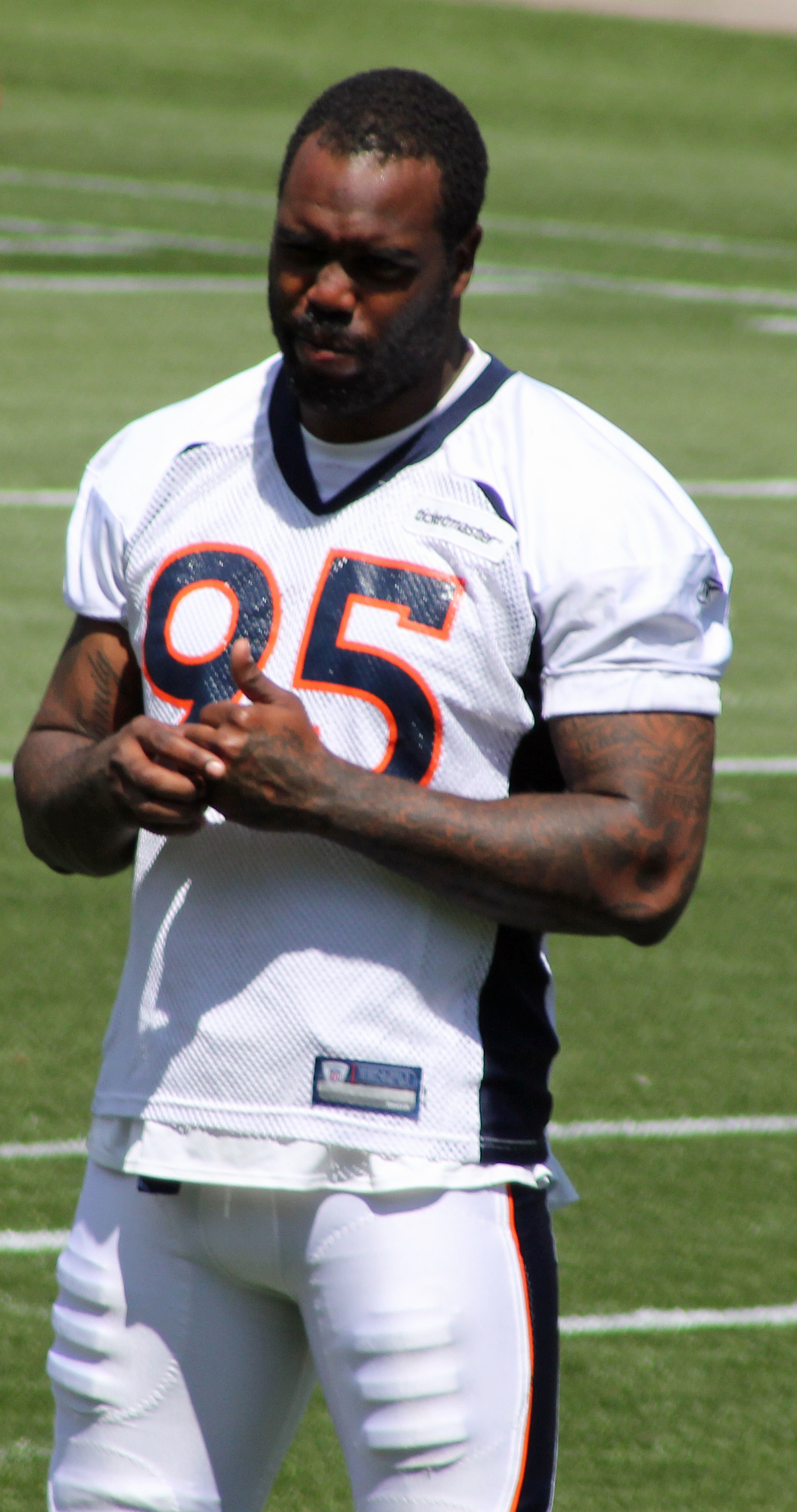
- Harvey with the Denver Broncos in 2011

No. 91, 95
- Position: Defensive end

Personal information
- Born: November 9, 1986 (age 39); Greenbelt, Maryland, U.S.
- Listed height: 6 ft 5 in (1.96 m)
- Listed weight: 268 lb (122 kg)

Career information
- High school: Roosevelt (Greenbelt)
- College: Florida (2004–2007)
- NFL draft: 2008: 1st round, 8th overall pick

Career history
- Jacksonville Jaguars (2008–2010); Denver Broncos (2011); Cincinnati Bengals (2012)*
- * Offseason or practice squad member only

Awards and highlights
- BCS national champion (2007); BCS National Championship Game MVP (2007); 2× Second-team All-SEC (2006, 2007)

Career NFL statistics
- Total tackles: 92
- Sacks: 8
- Fumble recoveries: 2
- Interceptions: 1
- Stats at Pro Football Reference

Derrick Harvey (born November 9, 1986) is an American former professional football player who was a defensive end in the National Football League (NFL). He played college football for the University of Florida, and was a member of a BCS National Championship team. He was selected by the Jacksonville Jaguars in the first round (eighth overall) of the 2008 NFL draft, and also played for the Denver Broncos.

== Early life ==
Harvey was born in Greenbelt, Maryland in 1986. He attended Eleanor Roosevelt High School in Greenbelt, Maryland, only starting his high school football career as a junior for the Roosevelt Raiders. As a senior, he recorded over 150 tackles and 31 sacks, a Maryland state record, as well as five forced fumbles, two recovered fumbles and five batted down passes. He led his team to a 12-1 record and the Maryland Class 4A state semi-finals, where they lost their only game of the season. He received first-team all-state honors by the Associated Press, and was the Maryland Gatorade Player of the Year.

Harvey was a high school first-team All-America selection by Parade magazine, Tom Lemming, EA Sports, Riddell and SuperPrep, and a second-team All-America selection by USA Today. A five-star recruit, he eventually committed to Florida, after also considering Ohio State, Maryland and Tennessee.

== College career ==
Harvey accepted an athletic scholarship to enroll at the University of Florida in Gainesville, Florida, where he played for coach Urban Meyer's Florida Gators football team from 2005 to 2007. As a true freshman in 2004, he was redshirted by the coaching staff and bulked up to 230 pounds. He saw limited action in nine games in 2005, playing behind starters Ray McDonald and Jarvis Moss at both defensive end positions, and compiled six tackles (four solo) with a six-yard quarterback sack and a pass deflection.

As a sophomore in 2006, Harvey shared left defensive end duties with senior Ray McDonald, and started five games when McDonald was sidelined with an injury. He recorded thirty-five tackles (twenty-four solo) and led the team with 11 sacks (fifth-best season total in Gators' history), and recovered three fumbles and caused another. He was recognized as a second-team All-Southeastern Conference (SEC) selection, in addition to receiving most valuable player accolades for his performance in the Gators' 41–14 victory over the Ohio State Buckeyes in the 2007 BCS National Championship Game.

As a junior team captain in 2007, Harvey earned second-team All-SEC. He started all thirteen games at left end, posting forty-nine tackles (thirty-one solo), including 8.5 sacks and seventeen tackles for a loss (tenth best on the Gators' single-season records list). After the Gators played in the Capital One Bowl, Harvey announced he would enter the NFL Draft.

In his three seasons as a Gator, Harvey played in thirty-six games and started eighteen. He closed his college career with 20.5 quarterback sacks (ninth on the Gators' career record list), and 51.5 tackles for a loss (third on the Gators' career record list). He also compiled ninety tackles (fifty-nine solo), caused two fumbles and recovered three, and deflected six passes.

== Professional career ==
=== Pre-draft ===
Prior to the NFL Combine, Harvey had run the 40-yard dash in times from 4.67-4.78 at a weight of 252 pounds. He drew comparisons to Bryan Thomas.

Pre-draft measurables
Height	Weight	40-yard dash	10-yard split	20-yard split	20-yard shuttle	Three-cone drill	Vertical jump	Broad jump	Bench press	Wonderlic
6 ft 4 5/8 in (1.95 m)	271 lb (123 kg)	4.84 s	1.59 s	2.76 s	4.36 s	7.27 s	28.5 in (0.72 m)	9 ft 5 in (2.87 m)	31 reps	x
All values from NFL Combine

=== Jacksonville Jaguars ===
Harvey was selected eighth overall in the first round by the Jacksonville Jaguars in the 2008 NFL draft. He was the first defensive end chosen by the Jaguars in the first round in franchise history, and was the third of four defensive ends chosen in the first round of 2008 draft. Harvey was the last 2008 first-round draft pick to sign a contract. On August 27, 2008, he signed a 5-year, $23.8 million contract with the Jaguars. The contract contained $17.175 million in guaranteed money and could have reached $33.4 million, had all the incentives and escalators been met. Harvey set the Jaguars' record for longest rookie holdout, totaling 38 days. It was formerly held by Byron Leftwich, whose holdout lasted 19 days. He was waived on July 29, 2011.

=== Denver Broncos ===
On August 1, 2011, Harvey signed with the Denver Broncos. He had no sacks and two tackles during the 2011 season, and the Broncos did not re-sign him.

=== Cincinnati Bengals ===
On March 23, 2012, Harvey signed with the Cincinnati Bengals. On August 5, 2012, Harvey was released by the Bengals.

=== NFL statistics ===
Year	Team	Games	Tackles	Solo	Assists	QB Sacks	Fumbles Rec'd	Interceptions	Passes Def'd
2008	JAX	16	19	15	4	3.5	0	1	2
2009	JAX	16	57	44	13	2.0	1	0	2
2010	JAX	15	12	11	1	2.5	0	0	1
2011	DEN	5	4	2	2	0.0	1	0	0
Career		52	92	72	20	8.0	2	1	5

== See also ==
- List of Florida Gators in the NFL draft
- List of Jacksonville Jaguars first-round draft picks
