= Brandon Siler =

American football player (born 1985)

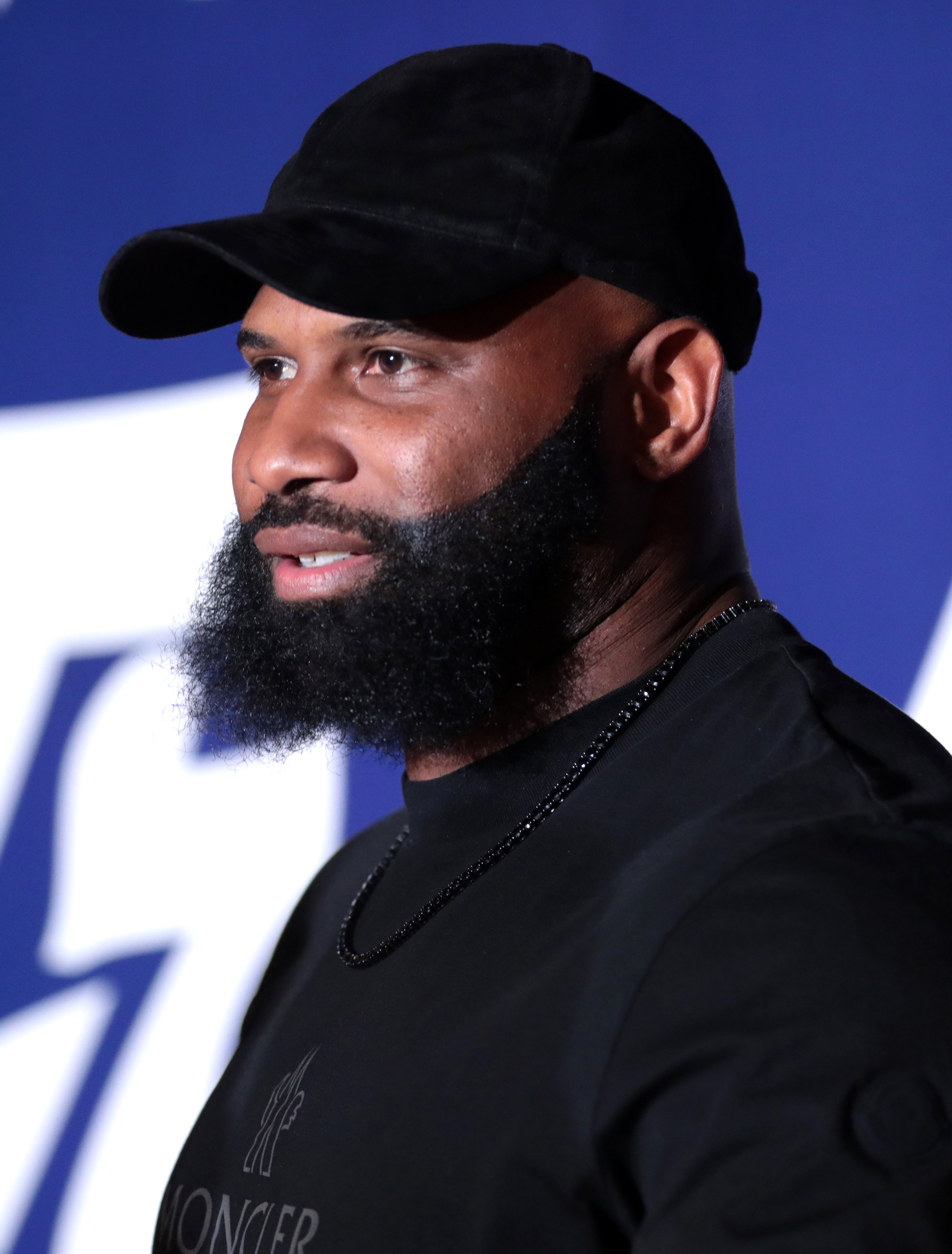
- Siler in 2023

No. 59, 52
- Position: Linebacker

Personal information
- Born: December 5, 1985 (age 40); Daytona Beach, Florida, U.S.
- Listed height: 6 ft 2 in (1.88 m)
- Listed weight: 239 lb (108 kg)

Career information
- High school: Maynard Evans (Orlando, Florida)
- College: Florida
- NFL draft: 2007: 7th round, 240th overall pick

Career history
- San Diego Chargers (2007–2010); Kansas City Chiefs (2011–2012)

Awards and highlights
- PFWA All-Rookie Team (2007); BCS national champion (2007); Third-team All-American (2006); Second-team All-SEC (2006)

Career NFL statistics
- Total tackles: 180
- Sacks: 3
- Interceptions: 2
- Stats at Pro Football Reference

Brandon T. Siler (born December 5, 1985) is an American former professional football player who was a linebacker in the National Football League (NFL) for six seasons. He played college football for the University of Florida, where he was a member of the Gators' 2006 national championship team. He was chosen by the San Diego Chargers in the seventh round of the 2007 NFL draft, and also played for the Kansas City Chiefs.

== Early life ==
Siler was born in Daytona Beach, Florida. Growing up in the Pine Hills area of Orlando, He attended Evans High School, where he was a star high school football player for the Evans Trojans. His grandfather, Herb Siler, was a heavyweight boxer in the 1960s.

== College career ==
Siler accepted a scholarship to attend his home-state University of Florida in Gainesville, Florida, where he played for coach Ron Zook and coach Urban Meyer's Florida Gators football from 2004 to 2006. His impact was felt early, as he started six games as a freshman, and he was recognized as the Southeastern Conference (SEC) Freshman of the Year. The Gators' new head coach Urban Meyer replaced Zook for Siler's sophomore season in 2005, and Siler amassed seven fumble recoveries. His play during his junior season in 2006 helped the 13–1 Gators win the SEC Championship Game and the 2007 BCS National Championship Game, and he earned second-team All-SEC and third-team All-American honors from the Associated Press. Siler was known for his work-ethic, energy and leadership on the field.

== Professional career ==
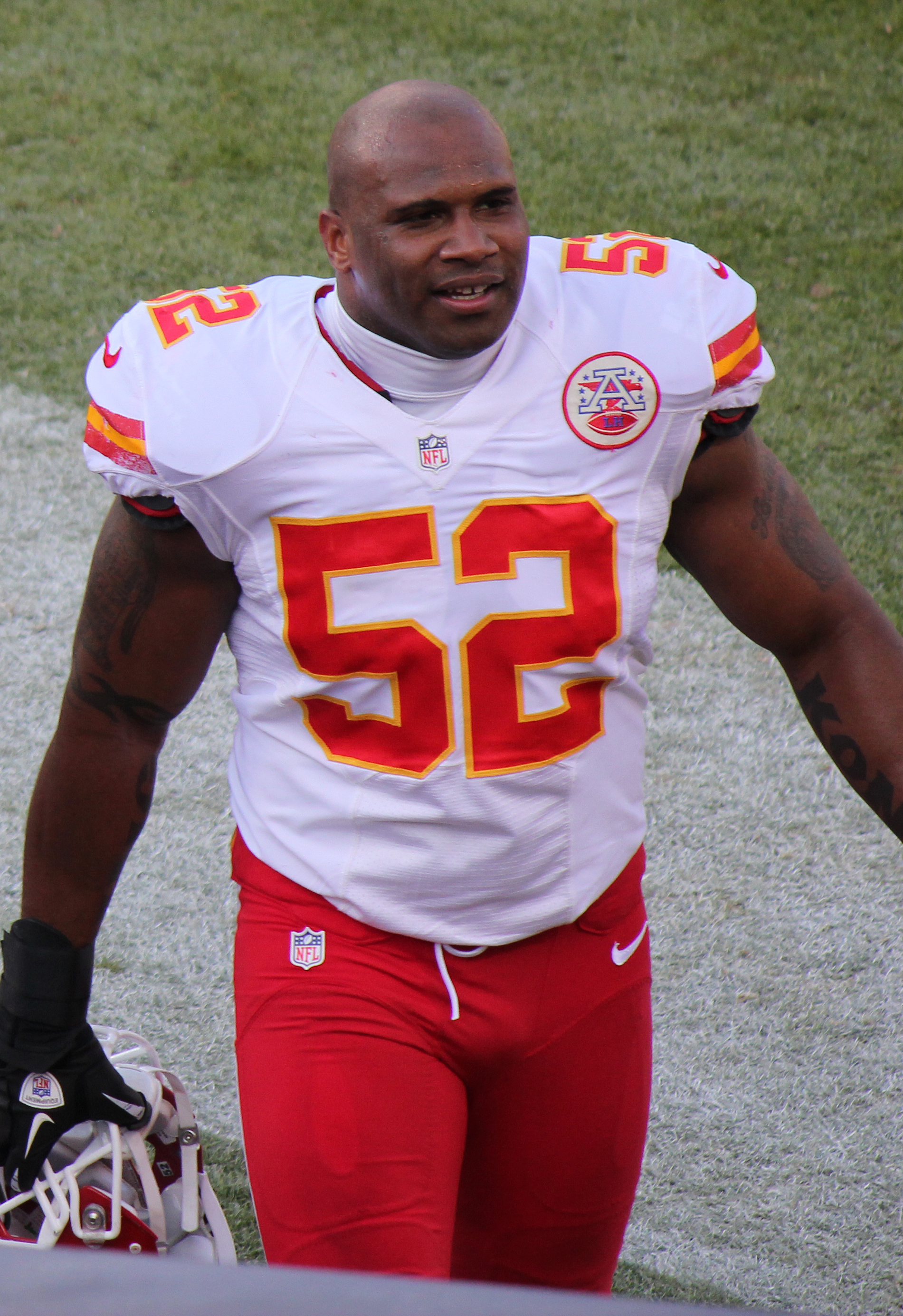
Siler with the Kansas City Chiefs in 2012

Pre-draft measurables
Height	Weight	Arm length	Hand span	40-yard dash	10-yard split	20-yard split	20-yard shuttle	Three-cone drill	Vertical jump	Broad jump	Bench press
6 ft 1 3/4 in (1.87 m)	241 lb (109 kg)	34 3/4 in (0.88 m)	10 1/8 in (0.26 m)	4.70 s	1.62 s	2.73 s	4.39 s	7.34 s	30.5 in (0.77 m)	9 ft 8 in (2.95 m)	23 reps
All values from NFL Combine/Florida Pro Day

=== San Diego Chargers ===
Siler was projected as a second–to–third round selection in the 2007 NFL draft. However, he was selected by the San Diego Chargers 240th overall in the seventh and final round of the 2007 NFL draft.

Siler, who also served as the backup long snapper, earned a spot on the Chargers roster. In 2007, he contributed on special teams, gathering the second-highest number of special-teams tackles. In 2008, he continued excelling on special teams and received more time on defense. His playing time expanded with the four-game suspension of Stephen Cooper.

=== Kansas City Chiefs ===
On July 31, 2011, Siler signed with the Kansas City Chiefs. He was placed on the injured reserve list due to an Achilles tendon rupture on August 25, and appeared in no games during the 2011 season. Siler played in 16 games in 2012, starting four. His contract expired after the 2012 NFL season, and he was not re-signed. In five NFL seasons, Siler played in 74 games, started 16 of them, and compiled 180 tackles, two interceptions, and three recovered fumbles.

== NFL career statistics ==
Legend
**Bold**	Career high

=== Regular season ===
Year	Team	Games		Tackles					Interceptions					Fumbles			
Year	Team	GP	GS	Cmb	Solo	Ast	Sck	TFL	Int	Yds	TD	Lng	PD	FF	FR	Yds	TD
2007	SDG	15	0	25	21	4	0.0	2	0	0	0	0	0	0	**2**	**23**	**1**
2008	SDG	15	0	25	16	9	0.0	1	0	0	0	0	0	0	0	0	0
2009	SDG	**16**	**7**	**67**	**52**	**15**	**2.0**	**6**	**1**	**5**	0	**5**	**2**	0	1	0	0
2010	SDG	12	5	44	34	10	1.0	**6**	**1**	0	0	0	**2**	0	0	0	0
2012	KAN	**16**	4	19	17	2	0.0	1	0	0	0	0	0	**1**	0	0	0
Career		74	16	180	140	40	3.0	16	2	5	0	5	4	1	3	23	1

=== Playoffs ===
Year	Team	Games		Tackles					Interceptions					Fumbles			
Year	Team	GP	GS	Cmb	Solo	Ast	Sck	TFL	Int	Yds	TD	Lng	PD	FF	FR	Yds	TD
2007	SDG	**3**	0	**6**	**4**	**2**	0.0	0	0	0	0	0	0	0	0	0	0
2008	SDG	1	0	4	2	**2**	0.0	0	0	0	0	0	0	0	0	0	0
2009	SDG	1	**1**	4	**4**	0	0.0	0	0	0	0	0	0	0	0	0	0
Career		5	1	14	10	4	0.0	0	0	0	0	0	0	0	0	0	0

== See also ==
- 2006 Florida Gators football team
- History of the San Diego Chargers
- List of Florida Gators football All-Americans
- List of Florida Gators in the NFL draft
- List of Kansas City Chiefs players
