= Jemalle Cornelius =

American football player (born 1984)

No. 6, 18
- Position: Wide receiver

Personal information
- Born: August 10, 1984 (age 42); Fort Meade, Florida, U.S.
- Listed height: 5 ft 11 in (1.80 m)
- Listed weight: 185 lb (84 kg)

Career information
- High school: Fort Meade
- College: Florida
- NFL draft: 2007: undrafted

Career history
- Buffalo Bills (2007)*; Indianapolis Colts (2007)*; Arizona Cardinals (2007–2008)*
- * Offseason or practice squad member only

Awards and highlights
- BCS national champion (2007)

Jemalle Cornelius (born August 10, 1984) is an American former college football who was a wide receiver for the Florida Gators. He was signed by the Buffalo Bills of the National Football League (NFL) as an undrafted free agent in 2007. He is currently a high school football coach.

== Early life ==
Cornelius was born in Fort Meade, Florida. He attended Fort Meade High School, and he played for the Fort Meade Miners high school football team.

== College career ==
Cornelius accepted an athletic scholarship to attend the University of Florida in Gainesville, Florida, where he was a wide receiver and special teams standout for the Florida Gators football from 2002 to 2006 under head coaches Ron Zook and Urban Meyer. As a senior in 2006, Cornelius became a starting wide receiver and team captain for the Gators' BCS National Championship team.

== Professional career ==
Cornelius signed a future contract with the Arizona Cardinals on December 31. 2007.

== Coaching career ==
Cornelius is currently the head coach at his alma mater, Fort Meade High School, where he was a star quarterback and wide receiver for the Miners' state runner-up teams in 1999, 2000 and 2001.
