= Steven Harris (defensive tackle) =

American football player (born 1984)

No. 68
- Position: Defensive tackle

Personal information
- Born: August 14, 1984 (age 42); Homestead, Florida, U.S.
- Listed height: 6 ft 5 in (1.96 m)
- Listed weight: 285 lb (129 kg)

Career information
- High school: Coral Gables (FL)
- College: Florida
- NFL draft: 2007: undrafted

Career history
- Denver Broncos (2007–2008)

Awards and highlights
- BCS national champion (2007)

Career NFL statistics
- Total tackles: 5
- Fumble recoveries: 1
- Stats at Pro Football Reference

Steven Harris (born August 14, 1984) is an American former professional football player who was a defensive tackle for one season with the Denver Broncos of the National Football League (NFL) in 2007. Harris played college football for the Florida Gators, and was a member of a BCS National Championship team. Thereafter, he played in the NFL for the Broncos.

== Early life ==
Harris was born in Homestead, Florida in 1984. He attended Coral Gables Senior High School in Coral Gables, Florida, where he played high school football for the Coral Gables Cavaliers.

== College career ==
Harris accepted an athletic scholarship to attend the University of Florida in Gainesville, Florida, where he was a defensive lineman for coach Ron Zook and coach Urban Meyer's Florida Gators football teams from 2003 to 2006. He was a starting defensive tackle for the 2006 Gators team that defeated the Ohio State Buckeyes, 41–14, in the 2007 BCS National Championship Game. As a senior in 2006, Harris was the recipient of the Gators' James W. Kynes Award, recognizing the lineman who "best exemplified mental and physical toughness and iron-man determination."

== Professional career ==
Harris was signed by the NFL's Denver Broncos as an undrafted free agent in 2007, and played in four regular season games for the Broncos during 2007. On August 31, 2008, Harris was signed to the Broncos practice squad; he was released on October 21 to make room for running back P. J. Pope.

== See also ==
- History of the Denver Broncos
- List of Florida Gators in the NFL draft
