= Earl Everett =

American football player (born 1984)

No. 30, 47
- Position: Linebacker

Personal information
- Born: December 10, 1984 (age 41); Bartow, Florida, U.S.
- Listed height: 6 ft 3 in (1.91 m)
- Listed weight: 231 lb (105 kg)

Career information
- College: Florida
- NFL draft: 2007: undrafted

Career history
- Cincinnati Bengals (2007)*; Atlanta Falcons (2007–2008)*; Turku Trojans (2011–2012)
- * Offseason or practice squad member only

Awards and highlights
- BCS national champion (2007); First-team All-SEC (2006); Second-team All-SEC (2004); Freshman All-SEC (2003)

Earl Everett (born December 10, 1984) is an American former football linebacker. He was originally signed by the Cincinnati Bengals as an undrafted free agent in 2007. He played college football at Florida. He also played professionally in Finland for the Turku Trojans.

== College career ==
A Parade All-American, Everett signed with the Gators in 2003 out of South Sumter High School in Bushnell, FL. He chose the Gators over in-state rivals Florida State and Miami.

Everett's impact was immediate as a freshman. He started six games and played in all 13 games in 2003. As a sophomore in 2004, Everett was the opening day starter.

His senior year in 2006 had him earn pre-season and postseason All-SEC honors as he led the team in tackles and was a team captain. His play helped Florida win the SEC Championship Game for the first time in 6 seasons and win the BCS Championship Game for the first time, the team's second national championship overall.

Everett made one of the most memorable plays of the 2007 BCS National Championship Game. In their first possession of the second half, Ohio State faced a 3rd down and 12 and threatened to move into Gator territory if they converted for a first down. Everett lost his helmet in pursuit of Ohio State quarterback Troy Smith and still recorded the sack, chasing Smith down from behind. Thus, the Buckeyes were forced to punt on 4th down. Everett received a bloody nose while making the helmet-less tackle.

== Professional career ==
Having gone undrafted in the 2007 NFL draft, it was reported on April 30, 2007 that Everett would sign a free agent contract with the Cincinnati Bengals. He was also on the practice squad of the Atlanta Falcons through 2008.

In 2010, Everett signed with the Turku Trojans in the top Finnish league Vaahteraliiga. He played for the Trojans in 2011-2012 seasons.
