= Reggie Lewis (cornerback) =

American gridiron football player (born 1984)

No. 22
- Position: Cornerback

Personal information
- Born: May 30, 1984 (age 42); Jacksonville, Florida, U.S.
- Listed height: 5 ft 10 in (1.78 m)
- Listed weight: 196 lb (89 kg)

Career information
- College: Florida
- NFL draft: 2007: undrafted

Career history
- Buffalo Bills (2007)*; Toronto Argonauts (2009)*; Tampa Bay Storm (2010); Dallas Vigilantes (2010)
- * Offseason or practice squad member only

Awards and highlights
- BCS national champion (2007)

Career AFL statistics
- Total tackles: 27
- Sacks: 1
- Forced fumbles: 1
- Stats at ArenaFan.com

Reggie Lewis (born May 30, 1984) is a former gridiron football cornerback. He was signed by the Buffalo Bills as an undrafted free agent in 2007. He played college football at Florida.

Lewis was also a member of the Tampa Bay Storm and Toronto Argonauts.

== Early life ==
Lewis received All-American honors from PrepStar when he was ranked among the top 12 players in the Southeast athlete category. He was also named the Florida Times-Union’s Offensive Player of the year for North Central Florida in 2000.

== College career ==
Lewis attended the University of Florida, where he, majored in Sociology, and played in a career total of 50 games, with 16 starts. As a freshman and sophomore, he played wide receiver then was switched to cornerback for the rest of his college career. His first career interception helped Florida to a double-overtime win over Vanderbilt. In 2005, he recovered a blocked field goal and returned it for a touchdown, the first in school history, against Florida State. In that same season, he intercepted a pass to help seal a 14-10 Florida win over Georgia. He recorded an interception and a pass broken up against Arkansas in the 2006 SEC Championship Game, he also intercepted a pass thrown by Heisman Trophy winner, Troy Smith of Ohio State in the 2007 BCS National Championship Game. Lewis was also named to the 2007 Hula Bowl.

== Professional career ==
=== National Football League ===
Lewis went unselected in the 2007 NFL draft and signed with the Buffalo Bills on May 3, 2007. However, he was released on August 27, 2007.

=== Arena Football League ===
In 2008 Lewis signed with the Tampa Bay Storm of the Arena Football League. Lakeland Raiders 2013

=== Canadian Football League ===
Lewis was signed by the Toronto Argonauts on February 25, 2009. He was released on June 7, 2009.
