= 2006 Vanderbilt Commodores football team =

American college football season

2006 Vanderbilt Commodores football
- Conference: Southeastern Conference
- Eastern Division
- Record: 4–8 (1–7 SEC)
- Head coach: Bobby Johnson (5th season)
- Offensive coordinator: Ted Cain (5th season)
- Offensive scheme: Multiple
- Defensive coordinator: Bruce Fowler (5th season)
- Base defense: 4–3
- Captain: 2: Joe Tomasko (injured, unlisted); Jonathan Goff
- Home stadium: Vanderbilt Stadium

2006 Southeastern Conference football standings
	Conf.			Overall
Team	W		L	W		L
Eastern Division
No. 1 Florida x$#	7	–	1	13	–	1
No. 25 Tennessee	5	–	3	9	–	4
No. 23 Georgia	4	–	4	9	–	4
Kentucky	4	–	4	8	–	5
South Carolina	3	–	5	8	–	5
Vanderbilt	1	–	7	4	–	8
Western Division
No. 15 Arkansas x	7	–	1	10	–	4
No. 9 Auburn	6	–	2	11	–	2
No. 3 LSU %	6	–	2	11	–	2
Alabama	2	–	6	6	–	7
Ole Miss	2	–	6	4	–	8
Mississippi State	1	–	7	3	–	9
Championship: Florida 38, Arkansas 28
# – BCS National Champion; $ – BCS representative as conference champion; % – BCS at-large representative; x – Division champion/co-champions; Alabama had all victories vacated by the NCAA in 2010. As such, the official record for Alabama is 0–7 (0–6).; Rankings from AP Poll

The 2006 Vanderbilt Commodores football team represented Vanderbilt University during the 2006 NCAA Division I FBS football season. The team's head coach was Bobby Johnson, who served his fifth year as the Commodores' head coach. Members of the Southeastern Conference (SEC), the Commodores played their home games at Vanderbilt Stadium at Dudley Field in Nashville, Tennessee. In 2006, Vanderbilt went 4–8 with a record of 1–7 in the SEC.

== Schedule ==
Date	Time	Opponent	Site	TV	Result	Attendance
September 2	12:00 p.m.	at No. 14 Michigan*	Michigan Stadium; Ann Arbor, MI	ESPN	L 7–27	109,668
September 9	2:30 p.m.	at Alabama	Bryant–Denny Stadium; Tuscaloosa, AL	FSN	L 10–13	92,138
September 16	11:30 a.m.	Arkansas	Vanderbilt Stadium; Nashville, TN	LFS	L 19–21	32,302
September 23	6:00 p.m.	Tennessee State*	Vanderbilt Stadium; Nashville, TN		W 38–9	27,460
September 30	6:00 p.m.	Temple*	Vanderbilt Stadium; Nashville, TN		W 43–14	34,319
October 7	1:00 p.m.	at Ole Miss	Vaught–Hemingway Stadium; Oxford, MS (rivalry)		L 10–17	51,211
October 14	11:30 a.m.	at No. 16 Georgia	Sanford Stadium; Athens, GA (rivalry)	LFS	W 24–22	92,746
October 21	2:00 p.m.	South Carolina^{†}	Vanderbilt Stadium; Nashville, TN	PPV	L 13–31	37,280
October 28	12:00 p.m.	at Duke*	Wallace Wade Stadium; Durham, NC		W 45–28	14,198
November 4	11:30 a.m.	No. 7 Florida	Vanderbilt Stadium; Nashville, TN	LFS	L 19–25	38,134
November 11	12:00 p.m.	at Kentucky	Commonwealth Stadium; Lexington, KY (rivalry)		L 26–38	52,235
November 18	11:30 a.m.	No. 22 Tennessee	Vanderbilt Stadium; Nashville, TN (rivalry)	LFS	L 10–39	39,773
*Non-conference game; ^{†}Homecoming; Rankings from AP Poll released prior to the game; All times are in Central time
