= Joe Cohen =

American gridiron football player (born 1984)

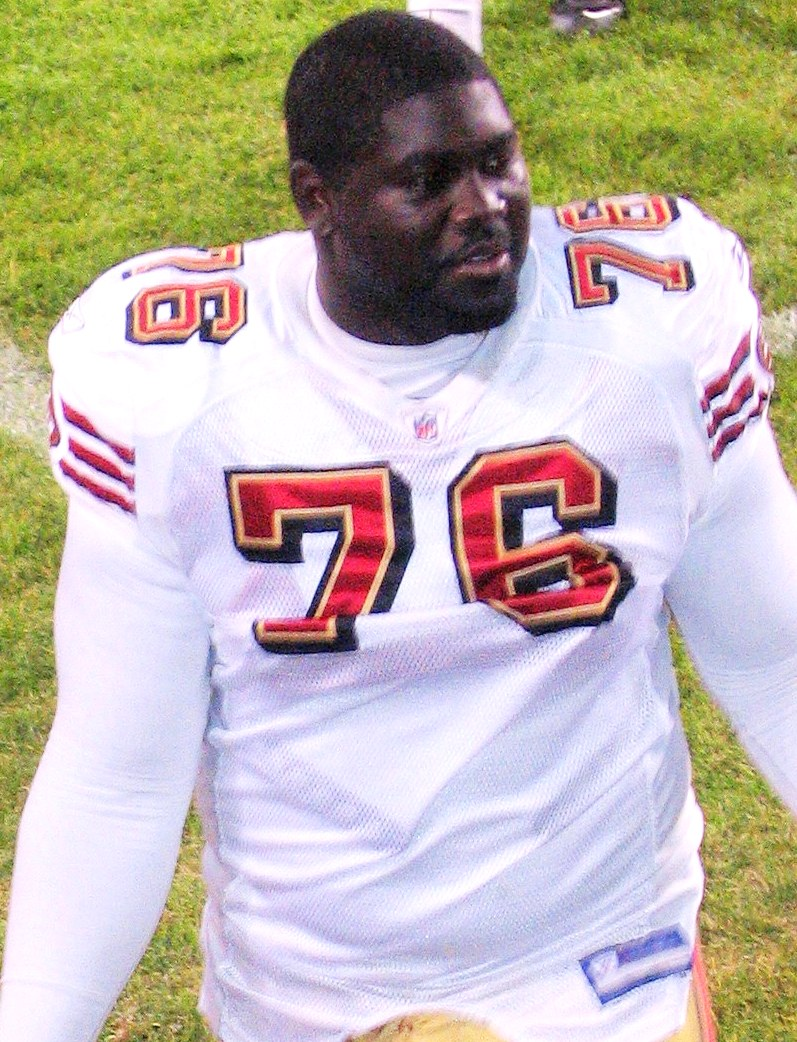
- Cohen with the 49ers in the 2008 preseason

No. 60
- Position: Defensive tackle

Personal information
- Born: June 6, 1984 (age 42); Melbourne, Florida, U.S.
- Listed height: 6 ft 2 in (1.88 m)
- Listed weight: 310 lb (141 kg)

Career information
- High school: Palm Bay (Melbourne)
- College: Florida
- NFL draft: 2007: 4th round, 135th overall pick

Career history
- San Francisco 49ers (2007); Miami Dolphins (2008–2009)*; Oakland Raiders (2009)*; Detroit Lions (2009); Toronto Argonauts (2012)
- * Offseason or practice squad member only

Awards and highlights
- BCS national champion (2007)
- Stats at Pro Football Reference

Joe Cohen (born June 6, 1984) is an American former professional football defensive tackle. Cohen played college football for the University of Florida, and was a member of a BCS National Championship team. He was picked by the San Francisco 49ers in the fourth round of the 2007 NFL draft. He played professionally for the Detroit Lions of the National Football League (NFL) and the Toronto Argonauts of the Canadian Football League (CFL).

== Early life ==
Cohen was born in Melbourne, Florida. He attended Palm Bay High School in Melbourne, and he played high school football for the Palm Bay Pirates. In high school, he played at the RB position as well as defensive line. Cincinnati Bengals defensive back Reggie Nelson and U.S. Olympic runner Xavier Carter were teammates of Cohen at Palm Bay High School. Following his high school career, Cohen played in the 2003 U.S. Army All-American Bowl with future Florida Gators teammates Chris Leak and Andre Caldwell.

== College career ==
Cohen accepted an athletic scholarship to attend the University of Florida in Gainesville, Florida, where he played for coach Ron Zook and coach Urban Meyer's Florida Gators football team from 2003 to 2006. As a senior in 2006, he was a member of the Gators' BCS National Championship team.

== Professional career ==
The San Francisco 49ers selected Cohen in the fourth round (135th overall pick) of the 2007 NFL draft. He played professionally for a single season for the Detroit Lions in 2009. On November 15, 2009, Cohen made the first sack of his pro career, sacking Minnesota Vikings quarterback Brett Favre in a 27–10 loss.

Cohen signed with the Toronto Argonauts of the CFL on June 7, 2012, and played in five regular season games for the Argos.

== Coaching career ==
He is currently an assistant football coach for the Viera Hawks at Viera High School in Viera, Florida.

== See also ==
- List of Florida Gators in the NFL draft
