= Chevon Walker =

Canadian football player

No. 24
- Positions: Running back, Kick returner

Personal information
- Born: May 9, 1987 (age 39); Montego Bay, Jamaica
- Listed height: 5 ft 10 in (1.78 m)
- Listed weight: 201 lb (91 kg)

Career information
- College: Florida; Eastern Illinois; Sioux Falls

Career history
- 2012–2013: Hamilton Tiger-Cats
- 2014–2015: Ottawa Redblacks
- 2015: Winnipeg Blue Bombers
- Stats at CFL.ca

Chevon Walker (born May 9, 1987) is a former professional Canadian football running back and kick returner. He played NCAA football for the Sioux Falls Cougars. He played two years of his career as a professional football player in the Canadian Football League (CFL) for the Hamilton Tiger-Cats. In 2014, the Ottawa Redblacks selected him in the expansion draft. He started the 2015 season with the Ottawa Redblacks before he was released on August 28, 2015. On September 1, 2015, it was announced that Walker had signed with the Winnipeg Blue Bombers. Walker had over 1,000 rushing yards and seven touchdowns in three years of professional play.

== CFL statistics ==
Name	Year	Team	Attempts	Yards	Avg	Long	TD
Walker, C	2012	Hamilton Tiger Cats	118	656	5.6	89	4
Walker, C	2013	Hamilton Tiger Cats	30	193	6.4	70	1
Walker, C	2014	Ottawa Redblacks	57	298	5.2	65	2
Career Total	-	-	205	1,147	5.6	89	7
