= Ryan Smith (cornerback, born 1985) =

American football player (born 1985)

No. 28
- Position: Cornerback

Personal information
- Born: July 17, 1985 (age 41); Diamond Bar, California, U.S.
- Listed height: 5 ft 10 in (1.78 m)
- Listed weight: 174 lb (79 kg)

Career information
- High school: Bishop Amat Memorial (La Puente, California)
- College: Florida, Utah
- NFL draft: 2007: 6th round, 206th overall pick

Career history
- Tennessee Titans (2007)*
- * Offseason or practice squad member only

Awards and highlights
- BCS national champion (2007); Second-team All-American (2006); First-team All-SEC (2006)

Ryan Chauncey Smith (born July 17, 1985) is an American former professional football player who was a cornerback in the National Football League (NFL). He played college football for the Florida Gators. He was also the nation's leader in interceptions (eight) in his final season at Florida.

== Career ==
Raised in Diamond Bar, California, Smith attended Bishop Amat Memorial High School in La Puente. He chose to play at the University of Utah and was an immediate starter under Urban Meyer's surprise 2004 Utes team, winning the Fiesta Bowl as a mid-major team. Using a new and scrutinized NCAA rule, Smith took 21 credit hours during the summer of 2006 to graduate and be eligible to play at a new college the next season. He re-united with Meyer in Florida for the University of Florida 2006 season, where he was a starter for the 2006 National champions.

He declared for the 2007 NFL draft despite having a year of eligibility remaining.

Pre-draft measurables
Height	Weight	Arm length	Hand span	40-yard dash	10-yard split	20-yard split	20-yard shuttle	Three-cone drill	Bench press
5 ft 10 1/4 in (1.78 m)	174 lb (79 kg)	32 1/2 in (0.83 m)	8 3/4 in (0.22 m)	4.72 s	1.75 s	2.80 s	4.12 s	7.07 s	11 reps
All values from NFL Combine/Pro Day

Smith was selected in the sixth round with the 206th pick in the 2007 NFL draft by the Tennessee Titans. On August 31, 2007, Smith was released by the Titans.

== See also ==
- List of Florida Gators football All-Americans
