= 2006 SEC Championship Game =

- Conference Championship
- 2006 SEC Championship logo
Arkansas Razorbacks	Florida Gators
(10–2)	(11–1)
28	38
Head coach: Houston Nutt	Head coach: Urban Meyer
AP / Coaches / BCS; 8 / 8 / 9	AP / Coaches / BCS; 4 / 4 / 4
	1	2	3	4	Total
Arkansas	0	7	14	7	28
Florida	3	14	7	14	38
- Date: December 2, 2006
- Season: 2006
- Stadium: Georgia Dome
- Location: Atlanta, Georgia
- MVP: WR Percy Harvin, Florida
- Favorite: Florida by 3
- National anthem: Razorback Marching Band; The Pride of the Sunshine
- Referee: Steve Shaw
- Halftime show: Razorback Marching Band; The Pride of the Sunshine
- Attendance: 73,374

United States TV coverage
- Network: CBS
- Announcers: Verne Lundquist, Gary Danielson and Tracy Wolfson

2006 Southeastern Conference football standings
	Conf.			Overall
Team	W		L	W		L
Eastern Division
No. 1 Florida x$#	7	–	1	13	–	1
No. 25 Tennessee	5	–	3	9	–	4
No. 23 Georgia	4	–	4	9	–	4
Kentucky	4	–	4	8	–	5
South Carolina	3	–	5	8	–	5
Vanderbilt	1	–	7	4	–	8
Western Division
No. 15 Arkansas x	7	–	1	10	–	4
No. 9 Auburn	6	–	2	11	–	2
No. 3 LSU %	6	–	2	11	–	2
Alabama	2	–	6	6	–	7
Ole Miss	2	–	6	4	–	8
Mississippi State	1	–	7	3	–	9
Championship: Florida 38, Arkansas 28
# – BCS National Champion; $ – BCS representative as conference champion; % – BCS at-large representative; x – Division champion/co-champions; Alabama had all victories vacated by the NCAA in 2010. As such, the official record for Alabama is 0–7 (0–6).; Rankings from AP Poll

The 2006 SEC Championship Game was played on December 2, 2006, in the Georgia Dome in Atlanta, Georgia. The game matched SEC Western Division champion Arkansas against SEC Eastern Division champion Florida. The second meeting between the two schools in the championship game, it led to a 38–28 victory for Florida. The two teams had previously met in the championship game in 1995, with the #2 Gators winning 34–3 against Arkansas. Florida later went on to win the BCS National Championship Game against Ohio State.

== Selection process ==
College football rules dictate that if a conference has twelve or more teams, an extra conference game (13th game of the season) may be played as a championship game to determine the conference champion. The SEC Championship Game matches up the winner of the Eastern and Western divisions of the Southeastern Conference. The game was first played in 1992, when the conference expanded from 10 to 12 teams with the addition of Arkansas and South Carolina. The SEC was the first conference in college football to have a conference championship game. Seven other conferences currently have conference championship games (Big Ten, Pac-12, Big 12, ACC, CUSA, MWC & MAC, and Big 12).

== Regular season ==
Entering the championship game, both Arkansas and Florida were the subject of mass hype. Ranked #8 and #4 respectively, Arkansas was led by the dynamic running back tandem of Darren McFadden and Felix Jones, while Florida was led by star duo quarterback Chris Leak and wide receiver Dallas Baker.

=== Arkansas ===
The preseason for Arkansas began as a disaster, with star running back Darren McFadden dislocating his toe, leaving Arkansas without its best weapon for the first game of the season. The regular season began just as disastrous, with a humiliating 50–14 loss against the USC Trojans. Coach Houston Nutt replaced starting quarterback Robert Johnson with star freshman Mitch Mustain after the former's poor play in the loss, and the latter's stellar performance. The change was instantly apparent for Arkansas, as Mustain helped to lead Arkansas to eight straight victories, including an overtime victory against the then #22 Alabama Crimson Tide, and a startling 27–10 victory at the then #2 Auburn Tigers. Relying on a powerful running game and a limited but efficient passing game, Arkansas handily won the games on the middle of its conference slate. But early in the first quarter in games won against Louisiana-Monroe and South Carolina, Mustain was kicked out for poor performance himself, including two interceptions early in the ULM game., and replaced with Casey Dick in a controversial move. Dick finished the season with a 125.72 passer efficiency rating compared to Mustain's 120.53. Although Dick led the Razorbacks to 2 more victories against Tennessee and Mississippi State with the latter clenching the Western Division for the Hogs, a poor performance contributed heavily in a loss to the LSU Tigers. Arkansas finished its regular season at 10–2, with a 7–1 mark in conference play.

=== Florida ===
Florida entered the 2006 season in the top 10 of many preseason lists. The Gators followed these high expectations by winning six straight games, including a 21–20 victory at #13 Tennessee and a 23–10 victory against #10 LSU. But on October 14, 2006, the Gators were defeated by #10 Auburn 27–17. But the Gators rebounded, and won the last 5 games of the regular season, winning the SEC Eastern Division title. Florida finished its regular season at 11–1, with a 7–1 record in conference play. Using a two quarterback system, Coach Urban Meyer would employ Leak and freshman Tim Tebow, with the latter using his running ability to catch defenses out of position.
