= Ray McDonald =

American football player (born 1984)

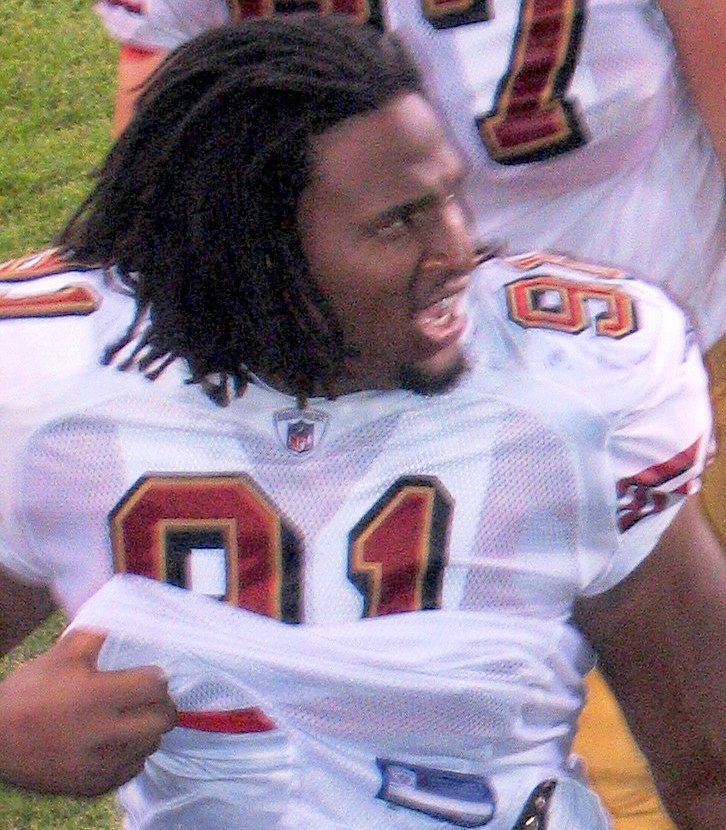
- McDonald with the San Francisco 49ers in 2008

No. 91
- Position: Defensive end

Personal information
- Born: September 2, 1984 (age 42); Pahokee, Florida, U.S.
- Listed height: 6 ft 3 in (1.91 m)
- Listed weight: 290 lb (132 kg)

Career information
- High school: Glades Central (Belle Glade, Florida)
- College: Florida (2003–2006)
- NFL draft: 2007: 3rd round, 97th overall pick

Career history
- San Francisco 49ers (2007–2014); Chicago Bears (2015)*
- * Offseason or practice squad member only

Awards and highlights
- BCS National Championship (2007); First-team All-SEC (2006)

Career NFL statistics
- Total tackles: 213
- Sacks: 19.5
- Forced fumbles: 5
- Fumble recoveries: 3
- Interceptions: 1
- Defensive touchdowns: 2
- Stats at Pro Football Reference

Raymondo Antoine McDonald (born September 2, 1984) is an American former professional football player who was a defensive end in the National Football League (NFL). He was selected by the San Francisco 49ers in the third round of the 2007 NFL draft. He played college football for the Florida Gators, where he was a member of a BCS National Championship team.

== Early life ==
McDonald was born in Pahokee, Florida, in 1984. He attended Glades Central High School in Belle Glade, Florida, and played high school football for the Glades Central Raiders. As a junior in 2000, he was a starting defensive lineman for the Glades Central Raiders team that won the Florida Class 3A state championship, and was named Palm Beach County Player of the Year as a senior in 2001.

== College career ==
McDonald accepted an athletic scholarship to attend the University of Florida in Gainesville, Florida, where he played for coach Ron Zook and coach Urban Meyer's Florida Gators football teams from 2003 to 2006. The Gators coaching staff decided to redshirt him as a true freshman in 2002, and he worked with the Gators scout team. McDonald was a team captain of the 2006 Gators squad that finished with a 13–1 record and defeated the Ohio State Buckeyes 41–14 in the 2007 BCS National Championship Game to win the Gators' second national championship. Following the 2006 season, he was recognized as a first-team All-Southeastern Conference (SEC) selection.

== Professional career ==
Pre-draft measurables
| Height | Weight | 40-yard dash | 10-yard split | 20-yard split | 20-yard shuttle | Three-cone drill | Vertical jump | Broad jump |
|---|---|---|---|---|---|---|---|---|
| 6 ft 3 3/8 in (1.91 m) | 276 lb (125 kg) | 4.88 s | 1.62 s | 2.77 s | 4.97 s | 7.41 s | 29.0 in (0.74 m) | 9 ft 6 in (2.90 m) |
All values from NFL Combine/Pro Day

=== San Francisco 49ers ===
The San Francisco 49ers selected McDonald in the third round (97th overall) of the 2007 NFL draft. In 2011, he signed a 5-year, $20 million extension, with $7 million guaranteed. McDonald registered a career-high 5.5 sacks and 39 tackles during the 2011 regular season. On November 16, 2012, McDonald was fined $21,000 for a helmet-to-helmet against St. Louis Rams quarterback Sam Bradford.

At the end of the 2012 season, McDonald and the 49ers appeared in Super Bowl XLVII. In the game, he had one sack and three combined tackles as the 49ers fell to the Baltimore Ravens by a score of 34–31.

On December 17, 2014, news outlets reported that McDonald was being investigated for a possible sexual assault. That same day, the 49ers released McDonald.

In 115 games with the 49ers, McDonald made 68 starts, and totaled 210 tackles, 19.5 sacks, and one interception, which he returned for a touchdown.

=== Chicago Bears ===
On March 24, 2015, McDonald signed a one-year deal with the Chicago Bears. On May 25, 2015, McDonald was released after being arrested on charges for domestic violence and child endangerment.

== NFL career statistics ==
Legend
| | Led the league |
| **Bold** | Career high |

=== Regular season ===
| Year | Team | Games | | Tackles | | | | | Interceptions | | | | | Fumbles | | | |
| Year | Team | GP | GS | Cmb | Solo | Ast | Sck | TFL | Int | Yds | TD | Lng | PD | FF | FR | Yds | TD |
|---|---|---|---|---|---|---|---|---|---|---|---|---|---|---|---|---|---|
| 2007 | SFO | 9 | 0 | 5 | 5 | 0 | 1.0 | 3 | 0 | 0 | 0 | 0 | 0 | 0 | 0 | 0 | 0 |
| 2008 | SFO | 15 | 9 | 27 | 20 | 7 | 1.0 | 2 | 0 | 0 | 0 | 0 | **5** | 0 | 0 | 0 | 0 |
| 2009 | SFO | **16** | 0 | 9 | 7 | 2 | 3.0 | 4 | 0 | 0 | 0 | 0 | 0 | 0 | **2** | **11** | **1** |
| 2010 | SFO | **16** | 0 | 19 | 13 | 6 | 0.0 | 2 | **1** | **31** | **1** | **31** | 2 | 0 | 0 | 0 | 0 |
| 2011 | SFO | 15 | 15 | **39** | **29** | 10 | **5.5** | **6** | 0 | 0 | 0 | 0 | 2 | **3** | 1 | 0 | 0 |
| 2012 | SFO | **16** | **16** | 38 | 28 | 10 | 2.5 | 5 | 0 | 0 | 0 | 0 | 1 | 1 | 0 | 0 | 0 |
| 2013 | SFO | 14 | 14 | 37 | **29** | 8 | 3.5 | **6** | 0 | 0 | 0 | 0 | 1 | 0 | 0 | 0 | 0 |
| 2014 | SFO | 14 | 14 | **39** | 25 | **14** | 3.0 | 4 | 0 | 0 | 0 | 0 | 0 | 1 | 0 | 0 | 0 |
| | | 115 | 68 | 213 | 156 | 57 | 19.5 | 32 | 1 | 31 | 1 | 31 | 11 | 5 | 3 | 11 | 1 |

=== Playoffs ===
| Year | Team | Games | | Tackles | | | | | Interceptions | | | | | Fumbles | | | |
| Year | Team | GP | GS | Cmb | Solo | Ast | Sck | TFL | Int | Yds | TD | Lng | PD | FF | FR | Yds | TD |
|---|---|---|---|---|---|---|---|---|---|---|---|---|---|---|---|---|---|
| 2011 | SFO | 2 | 2 | 5 | 4 | 1 | **2.5** | **1** | 0 | 0 | 0 | 0 | 0 | **1** | 0 | 0 | 0 |
| 2012 | SFO | **3** | **3** | 12 | **7** | 5 | 1.0 | **1** | 0 | 0 | 0 | 0 | 0 | 0 | 0 | 0 | 0 |
| 2013 | SFO | **3** | **3** | **13** | 5 | **8** | 0.5 | 0 | 0 | 0 | 0 | 0 | 0 | 0 | 0 | 0 | 0 |
| | | 8 | 8 | 30 | 16 | 14 | 4.0 | 2 | 0 | 0 | 0 | 0 | 0 | 1 | 0 | 0 | 0 |

== Personal life ==
McDonald's father, Ray McDonald Sr., was a four-year letterman for the Florida Gators from 1982 to 1985 and was a standout wide receiver on the 1985 Gators team that finished 9–1–1.

=== Legal troubles ===
On May 25, 2014, police arrived at McDonald's residence in response to a 911 call. A police report from that night states that an engaged couple "were in an argument when the female subject became upset, grabbed a firearm (handgun) registered to the male subject, and held it at her side. When the male subject informed the female subject that he was going to call 911, the female subject put the firearm away and fled without incident. The female subject did not make any threats or point the firearm at the male subject."

Three months later on August 31, 2014, police were again called to McDonald's residence. According to an unnamed police source, McDonald's fiancée showed authorities bruises on her arm and neck that she sustained in an alleged altercation with McDonald. The San Jose police department released a brief statement to the media shortly afterward saying that she did have visible injuries. McDonald was then arrested on suspicion of domestic violence. No formal charges were filed by the Santa Clara County District Attorney for either incident.

In December 2014, the San Francisco 49ers terminated McDonald just hours after he was named as a suspect in another sexual assault investigation. San Jose Police Sexual Assaults and Investigation Unit searched McDonald's home, as part of the investigation. He was formally indicted by a grand jury for sexual assault on August 27, 2015. Charged with rape by intoxication, McDonald was arrested and then released after posting $100,000 bail.

On May 25, 2015, McDonald was arrested once again on suspicion of domestic violence and possible child endangerment. On May 27, 2015, McDonald was arrested again, just two days after the prior arrest, for violating a restraining order. In July, he was charged with domestic violence, felony false imprisonment, child endangerment, and violating a court order.

== See also ==
- List of Florida Gators in the NFL draft
