= Jarvis Moss =

American football player (born 1984)

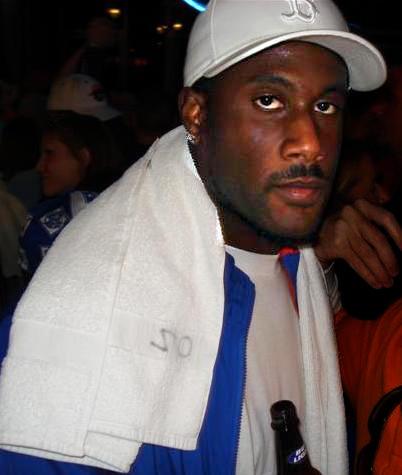
- Moss in 2006

No. 94
- Position: Defensive end

Personal information
- Born: August 3, 1984 (age 42); Denton, Texas, U.S.
- Listed height: 6 ft 7 in (2.01 m)
- Listed weight: 260 lb (118 kg)

Career information
- High school: Billy Ryan (Denton)
- College: Florida (2003–2006)
- NFL draft: 2007: 1st round, 17th overall pick

Career history
- Denver Broncos (2007–2010); Oakland Raiders (2010–2011)

Awards and highlights
- BCS national champion (2007); First-team All-American (2006)

Career NFL statistics
- Total tackles: 48
- Sacks: 6
- Forced fumbles: 1
- Stats at Pro Football Reference

Jarvis Jaray Moss (born August 3, 1984) is an American former professional football player who was a defensive end in the National Football League (NFL) for five seasons. He played college football for the University of Florida, received All-American honors, and was a member of a BCS National Championship team in 2006. Moss was selected by the Denver Broncos in the first round of the 2007 NFL draft, and played professionally for the Broncos and Oakland Raiders.

== Early life ==
Moss was born in Denton, Texas in 1984. He attended Billy Ryan High School in Denton, where he was instrumental in helping the Ryan Raiders win their first Texas Class 4A state championship. He played in the 2003 U.S. Army All-American Bowl, and was recognized as a Parade magazine high school All-American.

== College career ==
Moss accepted an athletic scholarship to attend the University of Florida in Gainesville, Florida, where he played for coach Ron Zook and coach Urban Meyer's Florida Gators football teams from 2003 to 2006.

Memorably, Moss blocked two crucial kicks in the fourth quarter of the Gators' 2006 victory over the South Carolina Gamecocks. The first block stopped a Gamecock point after touchdown (PAT) to keep South Carolina's lead at 16–10. The second was a block of a would-be game-winning field goal for South Carolina with eight seconds left on the game clock, and secured a 17–16 victory for the Gators. He was named a first-team All-American by Pro Football Weekly after the 2006 season.

Moss declared for the 2007 NFL Draft following the Gators' victory in the 2007 BCS National Championship Game.

== Professional career ==
Pre-draft measurables
Height	Weight	Arm length	Hand span	40-yard dash	10-yard split	20-yard split	20-yard shuttle	Three-cone drill	Vertical jump	Broad jump	Bench press
6 ft 6 1/2 in (1.99 m)	250 lb (113 kg)	34 5/8 in (0.88 m)	9 3/8 in (0.24 m)	4.70 s	1.52 s	2.68 s	4.41 s	7.21 s	30.5 in (0.77 m)	10 ft 0 in (3.05 m)	16 reps
All values from NFL Combine, except 20-ss and 3-cone, which are from Florida Pro Day (March 7, 2007).

Bench press: 265 lbs
Squat: 415 lbs

=== Denver Broncos ===
The Denver Broncos traded up in the draft with the Jacksonville Jaguars to select Moss in the first round with the 17th overall pick.The Jaguars used the pick from the Broncos to select Reggie Nelson, one of Moss' Florida Gators college teammates.

During the 2007 season, Moss played in six games for the Denver Broncos. He recorded 12 tackles and 1 sack. Moss broke his shin in practice on November 1, 2007, and was placed on injured reserve on November 2, 2007, ending his season.

During the 2008 season, Moss played in 12 games, recording 12 tackles and 2.5 sacks.

The Broncos' new defensive coordinator, Mike Nolan, moved Moss to outside linebacker, after he had spent his entire NFL career as a defensive end. During the 2009 training camp, it was reported that Moss was contemplating retirement because of struggles adapting to the defensive schemes. After several days of contemplation, Moss returned to practice and made the Broncos' 53-man roster after a pre-season performance that included three tackles, one sack and one forced fumble. After All-Pro Elvis Dumervil's potentially season-ending injury, Moss was announced to be the top candidate to take over as the starting outside linebacker.

On November 17, 2010, Moss was released by the Denver Broncos.

=== Oakland Raiders ===
On November 23, 2010, Moss was signed by the Oakland Raiders to play defensive end, replacing the injured Trevor Scott. On July 26, the Raiders resigned Moss to a one-year, $1.25 million contract. He played in thirteen games during the 2011 season, all but one of them in reserve. Following the season, his one-year contract expired and he became a free agent.

=== NFL statistics ===
Year	Team	GP	COMB	TOTAL	AST	SACK	FF	FR	FR YDS	INT	IR YDS	AVG IR	LNG	TD	PD
2007	DEN	6	12	9	3	1.0	1	0	0	0	0	0	0	0	0
2008	DEN	12	12	10	2	2.5	0	0	0	0	0	0	0	0	0
2009	DEN	7	0	0	0	0.0	0	0	0	0	0	0	0	0	1
2010	DEN	9	5	4	1	0.0	0	0	0	0	0	0	0	0	0
2010	OAK	5	3	0	3	1.0	0	0	0	0	0	0	0	0	0
2011	OAK	14	16	11	5	1.5	0	0	0	0	0	0	0	0	1
Career		53	48	34	14	6.0	1	0	0	0	0	0	0	0	2

== See also ==
- 2006 College Football All-America Team
- 2006 Florida Gators football team
- List of Denver Broncos first-round draft picks
- List of Florida Gators football All-Americans
- List of Florida Gators in the NFL draft
