= Dallas Baker =

American gridiron football player and coach (born 1982)

Baylor Bears
- Title: Wide receivers coach

Personal information
- Born: November 10, 1982 (age 43); New Smyrna Beach, Florida, U.S.
- Listed height: 6 ft 3 in (1.91 m)
- Listed weight: 206 lb (93 kg)

Career information
- Position: Wide receiver (No. 81, 88, 86)
- High school: New Smyrna Beach (FL); Northfield Mt. Hermon (MA)
- College: Florida
- NFL draft: 2007: 7th round, 227th overall pick

Career history

Playing
- Pittsburgh Steelers (2007–2008); Jacksonville Sharks (2010); Montreal Alouettes (2011); Saskatchewan Roughriders (2011–2012); San Antonio Talons (2013−2014)

Coaching
- Warner (2015–2016) Wide receivers coach; Marshall (2017–2020) Wide receivers coach; Buffalo (2021) Wide receivers coach; Baylor (2022–present) Wide receivers coach

Awards and highlights
- Super Bowl champion (XLIII); BCS national champion (2007); First-team All-SEC (2006)

Career NFL statistics
- Receptions: 1
- Receiving yards: 6
- Stats at Pro Football Reference

Career CFL statistics
- Receptions: 23
- Receiving yards: 300
- Receiving average: 13
- Stats at CFL.ca (archived)

Career AFL statistics
- Receptions: 102
- Receiving yards: 1,303
- Receiving average: 12.77
- Receiving touchdowns: 25
- Stats at ArenaFan.com

Dallas Leon Baker (born November 10, 1982) is an American former professional football player who was a wide receiver in the National Football League (NFL) and Canadian Football League (CFL). He played college football for the Florida Gators, and thereafter played professionally for the NFL's Pittsburgh Steelers and the CFL's Montreal Alouettes and Saskatchewan Roughriders. He also played for the Jacksonville Sharks and San Antonio Talons of the Arena Football League (AFL). As a member of the Steelers, he won Super Bowl XLIII. Baker is currently the wide receivers coach at Baylor University.

== Early life ==
Baker was born in New Smyrna Beach, Florida, and attended New Smyrna Beach High School, where he was a star wide receiver for the New Smyrna Beach Barracudas high school football team. In 2001, he set the single season Barracudas' record with seventeen touchdowns, 67 catches and 1,142 yards He attended Northfield Mount Hermon School for a postgraduate year. Dallas led NMH to the New England championship in football, losing to Kent 42-7, and was a standout player on NMH's basketball team. Baker graduated from NMH in 2002.

== College career ==
Baker accepted an athletic scholarship to attend the University of Florida in Gainesville, Florida, and played for coach Ron Zook and coach Urban Meyer's Gators teams from 2003 to 2006. He originally signed to play for the Gators in February 2001 as a member of what would become coach Steve Spurrier's final recruiting class at Florida, but due to NCAA academic eligibility issues, Baker instead enrolled at Northfield Mount Hermon School, an elite preparatory school in Massachusetts, for one year. While at Mt. Hermon, Baker led his team to the New England Championship game. After Spurrier left Florida for the NFL and Zook was hired to replace him, Baker stuck with Florida and enrolled as a partial-qualifier in 2002.

Urban Meyer's hiring at Florida three seasons later marked a turning point in Baker's career at Florida. In 2005, he made fifty-six receptions, doubling his total from the previous season. Afterward, Baker's college grades were good enough to earn back the year of eligibility lost to the partial qualification.

As a senior team captain in 2006, Baker delivered career highs for receptions (60), receiving yards (920), and receiving touchdowns (10), and was a first-team All-Southeastern Conference (SEC) selection. Baker's 25-yard touchdown catch provided the winning margin in the Gators' 21–14 victory over the rival Florida State Seminoles. The following week, the Gators defeated Arkansas to win the SEC Championship Game for the first time in six years. The Gators would go on to rout the heavily favored Ohio State Buckeyes and capture their second national championship, with Baker catching a touchdown pass for the Gators first score in their 41–14 victory in the 2007 BCS National Championship Game. Throughout his college career, the college football analysts on ESPN called him "Dallas Baker, Touchdown Maker," hearkening back to his nickname from his New Smyrna Beach High School days.

He graduated from the University of Florida in December 2006 with a bachelor's degree in health and human performance.

== Professional career ==
Pre-draft measurables
Height	Weight	Arm length	Hand span	40-yard dash	10-yard split	20-yard split	20-yard shuttle	Three-cone drill	Vertical jump	Broad jump
6 ft 3 1/8 in (1.91 m)	208 lb (94 kg)	36 1/2 in (0.93 m)	10 1/8 in (0.26 m)	4.59 s	1.58 s	2.66 s	4.19 s	6.69 s	36.0 in (0.91 m)	10 ft 9 in (3.28 m)
All values from NFL Combine

=== Pittsburgh Steelers ===
The Pittsburgh Steelers chose Baker in the seventh round (227th pick overall) of the 2007 NFL draft. He played for the Steelers from 2007 to 2009. He was cut by the Steelers on September 1, 2007, but quickly re-joined the organization as a member of the practice squad on September 2.

Baker made the Steelers' 53-man roster out of training camp in 2008. He played in eight games, recording one catch for six yards, before being waived on November 15 to make room for cornerback Roy Lewis; the Steelers' re-signed Baker to their practice squad on November 19.

Baker signed a future contract with the Steelers in February 2009. He was released in final cuts on September 5, 2009.

=== Jacksonville Sharks ===
Baker joined the Jacksonville Sharks of the Arena Football League (AFL) in the early part of the 2010 season, making his AFL debut in the third game of the season against the Orlando Predators.

=== Canadian Football League ===
Baker signed with the Montreal Alouettes of the Canadian Football League on April 5, 2011. On August 8, 2011, he was traded to the Saskatchewan Roughriders for Luc Mullinder.

== Coaching career ==
Baker was the wide receivers coach at Warner University, a Christian college in Lake Wales, Florida. On March 10, 2017, Baker accepted the position of wide receivers coach at Marshall University in Huntington, WV.

On May 15, 2021 Buffalo head coach Maurice Linguist hired Baker as wide receivers coach.

In January 2022, Baker was hired as the wide receivers coach by Dave Aranda at Baylor.

== Personal life ==
Baker is the nephew of Wes Chandler, who is a former All-American Gator wide receiver, NFL standout and professional football coach. Baker's younger brother Perry Baker is a former professional rugby sevens player and represented the USA in the 2016 and 2024 Olympics.

== See also ==
- 2006 Florida Gators football team
- List of Pittsburgh Steelers players
- List of Florida Gators in the NFL draft
- List of University of Florida alumni
