= 2006 Oklahoma Sooners football team =

American college football season

2006 Oklahoma Sooners football

Big 12 champion Big 12 South Division champion

Big 12 Championship Game, W 21–7 vs. Nebraska

Fiesta Bowl, L 42–43 ^{OT} vs. Boise State
- Conference: Big 12 Conference
- South

Ranking
- Coaches: No. 11
- AP: No. 11
- Record: 11–3 (7–1 Big 12)
- Head coach: Bob Stoops (8th season)
- Offensive coordinator: Kevin Wilson (5th season)
- Offensive scheme: Multiple/Northwestern spread
- Defensive coordinator: Brent Venables (8th season)
- Base defense: 4–3
- Home stadium: Gaylord Family Oklahoma Memorial Stadium (Capacity: 82,112)

2006 Big 12 Conference football standings
	Conf.			Overall
Team	W		L	W		L
North Division
Nebraska x	6	–	2	9	–	5
Missouri	4	–	4	8	–	5
Kansas State	4	–	4	7	–	6
Kansas	3	–	5	6	–	6
Colorado	2	–	6	2	–	10
Iowa State	1	–	7	4	–	8
South Division
No. 11 Oklahoma x$	7	–	1	11	–	3
No. 13 Texas	6	–	2	10	–	3
Texas A&M	5	–	3	9	–	4
Texas Tech	4	–	4	8	–	5
Oklahoma State	3	–	5	7	–	6
Baylor	3	–	5	4	–	8
Championship: Oklahoma 21, Nebraska 7
$ – BCS representative as conference champion; x – Division champion/co-champions; Rankings from AP Poll

The 2006 Oklahoma Sooners football team represented the University of Oklahoma in the 2006 NCAA Division I FBS football season, the 112th season of Sooner football. The team was led by two-time Walter Camp Coach of the Year Award winner, Bob Stoops, in his eighth season as head coach. They played their homes games at Gaylord Family Oklahoma Memorial Stadium in Norman, Oklahoma. They were a charter member of the Big 12 Conference.

The season began on a bad note when starting quarterback Rhett Bomar and offensive lineman J.D. Quinn were kicked off the team for violating NCAA rules when they received payment for work they did not do the day before fall practice started. Paul Thompson, who had not practiced in the quarterback role for nearly a year, was asked to move back to quarterback, which he did.

Conference play began with a loss to the Texas Longhorns in the annual Red River Rivalry on October 7, and ended with a win over the Nebraska Cornhuskers in the Big 12 Championship Game on December 2. The Sooners finished the regular season with an 11–2 record (7–1 in Big 12) while winning their fourth Big 12 title and their 40th conference title overall. They received an automatic berth to the Fiesta Bowl, where they were upset by the Boise State Broncos, 42–43, in what many consider to be one of the greatest bowl games of all time.

Following the season, Adrian Peterson was selected seventh overall in the 2007 NFL draft, Rufus Alexander was chosen in the 6th round, and C. J. Ah You was drafted in the 7th.

== Preseason ==
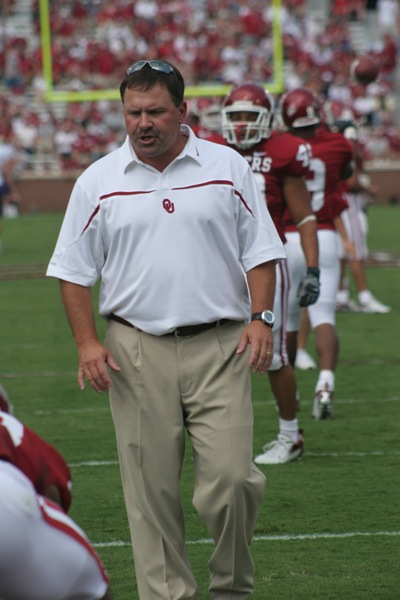
Kevin Wilson, promoted to offensive coordinator before the beginning of the season

After the previous year's 8–4 season, the Sooners looked to return to past success in 2006. Standout running back Adrian Peterson came into the season healthy and was also on the Maxwell Award watch list. Star linebacker Rufus Alexander (a Bednarik Award hopeful) returned for his senior campaign as did defensive ends C.J. Ah You, Larry Birdine, and Calvin Thibodeaux (Ah You and Birdine were Ted Hendricks Award hopefuls). Reggie Smith was also named to the Jim Thorpe Award watch list.

Nearly all major sports publications had the Sooners in the preseason Top 10. Some had the Sooners as the preseason No. 1 pick including Athlon, Phil Steele and Gold Sheet. The team had a lot of young talent this year. The high school scouting website Rivals.com ranked Oklahoma's 2005 recruiting class number one in the nation and the 2006 recruiting class number nine. Most of the 2006 signees redshirted and did not play in 2006. When combined with statements from the Oklahoma coaching staff, the Sooners expected to be back in contention for the national title this year. On July 24, 2006, the Sooners were a 5–1 favorite to win the National Championship.

The Sooners adopted a different jersey design in 2006, which included the removal of the players' last names from the back of the jersey due to the design of the uniform's shoulders and back, and a darker crimson color for the jersey and helmet.

On August 2, 2006, quarterback Rhett Bomar and offensive lineman J.D. Quinn, both sophomores, were dismissed from the team. It was reported that they violated NCAA regulations regarding receiving extra compensation. It was later determined Bomar received $7,406.88 and Quinn $8,137.17. The loss of these two key players affected the team's placement in many publications' preseason polls as well as their chances of winning a national championship. The team turned to starting quarterback Paul Thompson (a converted wide receiver in 2005) and backup Joey Halzle to lead the team.

After investigating the Bomar scandal, on July 11, 2007, the NCAA announced a finding of "failure to monitor" the employment of student athletes and handed out penalties. These included a verdict that all wins from the 2005 Oklahoma season were vacated, changing the team's record from 8–4 to 0–4 for that year. The University of Oklahoma appealed the finding, and the wins were later restored.

College recruiting (2006)
Name	Hometown	School	Height	Weight	40^{‡}	Commit date
Curtis Bailey; OL	Dallas, TX	David W Carter HS	6 ft 6.5 in (1.99 m)	347.5 lb (157.6 kg)	5.8	Dec 6, 2005
Curtis Bailey; OL	Recruit ratings: Scout: Rivals: (78)					
Jeremy Beal; DE/DT	Carrollton, TX	Creekview HS	6 ft 2.5 in (1.89 m)	244 lb (111 kg)	4.7	Dec 18, 2005
Jeremy Beal; DE/DT	Recruit ratings: Scout: Rivals: (80)					
Chase Beeler; OL	Jenks, OK	Jenks HS	6 ft 3.5 in (1.92 m)	275 lb (125 kg)	5.34	Jan 1, 2006
Chase Beeler; OL	Recruit ratings: Scout: Rivals: (75)					
Sam Bradford; QB	Oklahoma City, OK	Putnam City North HS	6 ft 4 in (1.93 m)	195 lb (88 kg)	4.67	May 24, 2005
Sam Bradford; QB	Recruit ratings: Scout: Rivals: (77)					
Cory Brandon; OL	Corsicana, TX	Corsicana HS	6 ft 6 in (1.98 m)	262.5 lb (119.1 kg)	5.2	Jul 5, 2005
Cory Brandon; OL	Recruit ratings: Scout: Rivals: (79)					
Chris Brown; RB	Alexandria, LA	Alexandria Senior HS	5 ft 10.25 in (1.78 m)	193 lb (88 kg)	4.48	Dec 5, 2005
Chris Brown; RB	Recruit ratings: Scout: Rivals: (78)					
Brandon Caleb; WR	Fork Union, VA	Fork Union Military Academy	6 ft 1 in (1.85 m)	195 lb (88 kg)	4.58	Aug 12, 2005
Brandon Caleb; WR	Recruit ratings: Scout: Rivals: (78)					
Quinton Carter; S/ATH	North Las Vegas, NV	Cheyenne HS	6 ft 1 in (1.85 m)	178 lb (81 kg)	4.55	Dec 19, 2005
Quinton Carter; S/ATH	Recruit ratings: Scout: Rivals: (77)					
Brandon Crow; LB	Comanche, OK	Comanche HS	6 ft 1.5 in (1.87 m)	212 lb (96 kg)	4.66	Nov 2, 2005
Brandon Crow; LB	Recruit ratings: Scout: Rivals: (77)					
Dominique Franks; CB/DB	Tulsa, OK	Union HS	5 ft 11.5 in (1.82 m)	181 lb (82 kg)	4.44	Nov 7, 2005
Dominique Franks; CB/DB	Recruit ratings: Scout: Rivals: (74)					
Jermaine Gresham; TE	Ardmore, OK	Ardmore HS	6 ft 6.5 in (1.99 m)	228 lb (103 kg)	4.7	Feb 1, 2006
Jermaine Gresham; TE	Recruit ratings: Scout: Rivals: (81)					
Joey Halzle; QB	Huntington Beach, CA	Golden Beach CC	6 ft 4 in (1.93 m)	215 lb (98 kg)	4.58	Dec 11, 2005
Joey Halzle; QB	Recruit ratings: Scout: Rivals:					
Tim Johnson; DE	Homewood, IL	NE Oklahoma A&M	6 ft 5 in (1.96 m)	260 lb (120 kg)	4.7	Jul 29, 2005
Tim Johnson; DE	Recruit ratings: Scout: Rivals:					
Pryce Macon; DE/DT	Corpus Christi, TX	Carroll HS	6 ft 1 in (1.85 m)	254 lb (115 kg)	4.78	Jun 30, 2005
Pryce Macon; DE/DT	Recruit ratings: Scout: Rivals: (80)					
Mossis Madu; RB/ATH	Norman, OK	Norman HS	6 ft 0.5 in (1.84 m)	190 lb (86 kg)	4.49	Dec 20, 2005
Mossis Madu; RB/ATH	Recruit ratings: Scout: Rivals: (78)					
Gerald McCoy; DT	Oklahoma City, OK	Southeast HS	6 ft 4 in (1.93 m)	295 lb (134 kg)	4.95	Feb 1, 2006
Gerald McCoy; DT	Recruit ratings: Scout: Rivals: (89)					
Eric Mensik; TE	Rosenberg, TX	B. F. Terry HS	6 ft 5 in (1.96 m)	231.5 lb (105.0 kg)	4.87	Dec 11, 2005
Eric Mensik; TE	Recruit ratings: Scout: Rivals: (78)					
Sherrone Moore; OL	El Dorado, KS	Butler County CC	6 ft 5 in (1.96 m)	305 lb (138 kg)	5.2	Jan 7, 2006
Sherrone Moore; OL	Recruit ratings: Scout: Rivals:					
DeMarco Murray; RB	Las Vegas, NV	Bishop Gorman HS	6 ft 0.5 in (1.84 m)	184 lb (83 kg)	4.5	Jan 7, 2006
DeMarco Murray; RB	Recruit ratings: Scout: Rivals: (92)					
Jonathan Nelson; CB/DB	Arlington, TX	Mansfield Summit HS	5 ft 11.5 in (1.82 m)	175 lb (79 kg)	4.46	Jul 8, 2005
Jonathan Nelson; CB/DB	Recruit ratings: Scout: Rivals: (81)					
Chris Patterson; LB	Chicago, IL	Northeastern Oklahoma A&M	6 ft 2.5 in (1.89 m)	223 lb (101 kg)	4.45	Aug 8, 2003
Chris Patterson; LB	Recruit ratings: Scout: Rivals:					
Chad Roark; OL	Ada, OK	Ada HS	6 ft 2 in (1.88 m)	287 lb (130 kg)	5.18	Oct 25, 2005
Chad Roark; OL	Recruit ratings: Scout: Rivals: (78)					
Daniel Tabon; LB/ATH	Altus, OK	Altus HS	6 ft 3 in (1.91 m)	215 lb (98 kg)	4.45	Dec 20, 2005
Daniel Tabon; LB/ATH	Recruit ratings: Scout: Rivals: (40)					
Adrian Taylor; DT	Mansfield, TX	Mansfield HS	6 ft 4.5 in (1.94 m)	270 lb (120 kg)	5.35	Jan 9, 2006
Adrian Taylor; DT	Recruit ratings: Scout: Rivals:					
Adron Tennell; WR	Irving, TX	Irving HS	6 ft 4 in (1.93 m)	183 lb (83 kg)	4.49	Jul 21, 2005
Adron Tennell; WR	Recruit ratings: Scout: Rivals: (85)					
Brandon Walker; OL	Detroit, MI	Coffeyville CC	6 ft 3 in (1.91 m)	315 lb (143 kg)	5.25	Jan 28, 2006
Brandon Walker; OL	Recruit ratings: Scout: Rivals:					
Malcolm Williams; S	Grand Prairie, TX	South Grand Prairie HS	5 ft 10 in (1.78 m)	174 lb (79 kg)	4.51	Jan 14, 2006
Malcolm Williams; S	Recruit ratings: Scout: Rivals: (80)					
Trent Williams; OL	Longview, TX	Longview HS	6 ft 4.5 in (1.94 m)	295 lb (134 kg)	5.33	Dec 11, 2005
Trent Williams; OL	Recruit ratings: Scout: Rivals: (76)					
Overall recruit ranking: Scout: t7 Rivals: 9
‡ Refers to 40-yard dash; Note: In many cases, Scout, Rivals, 247Sports, On3, and ESPN may conflict in their listings of height, weight and 40 time.; In these cases, the average was taken. ESPN grades are on a 100-point scale.; Sources: "Oklahoma 2006 Football Commitments". Rivals.; "2006 Oklahoma Commits". Scout.; "2006 Player Commitments – Oklahoma". ESPN.; "Scout.com Team Recruiting Rankings". Scout.; "2006 Team Ranking". Rivals.com.

== Schedule ==
Date	Time	Opponent	Rank	Site	TV	Result	Attendance
September 2	6:00 p.m.	UAB*	No. 10	Gaylord Family Oklahoma Memorial Stadium; Norman, OK	TBS	W 24–17	84,555
September 9	2:30 p.m.	Washington*	No. 15	Gaylord Family Oklahoma Memorial Stadium; Norman, OK	ABC	W 37–20	84,577
September 16	2:30 p.m.	at No. 18 Oregon*	No. 15	Autzen Stadium; Eugene, OR	ABC	L 33–34	59,269
September 23	6:00 p.m.	Middle Tennessee*	No. 17	Gaylord Family Oklahoma Memorial Stadium; Norman, OK	PPV	W 59–0	84,326
October 7	2:30 p.m.	vs. No. 7 Texas	No. 14	Cotton Bowl; Dallas, TX (Red River Rivalry)	ABC	L 10–28	76,260
October 14	11:30 a.m.	Iowa State	No. 23	Gaylord Family Oklahoma Memorial Stadium; Norman, OK	FSN	W 34–9	84,152
October 21	6:00 p.m.	Colorado^{†}	No. 20	Gaylord Family Oklahoma Memorial Stadium; Norman, OK	FSN	W 24–3	84,443
October 28	11:00 a.m.	at No. 23 Missouri	No. 19	Faurot Field; Columbia, MO (rivalry)	ABC	W 26–10	62,045
November 4	7:00 p.m.	at No. 21 Texas A&M	No. 18	Kyle Field; College Station, TX (College GameDay)	ABC	W 17–16	85,697
November 11	6:00 p.m.	Texas Tech	No. 17	Gaylord Family Oklahoma Memorial Stadium; Norman, OK	FSN	W 34–24	85,313
November 18	11:00 a.m.	at Baylor	No. 16	Floyd Casey Stadium; Waco, TX	FSN	W 36–10	31,221
November 25	1:30 p.m.	at Oklahoma State	No. 13	Boone Pickens Stadium; Stillwater, OK (Bedlam Series)	FSN	W 27–21	42,819
December 2	7:00 p.m.	vs. No. 19 Nebraska	No. 8	Arrowhead Stadium; Kansas City, MO (Big 12 Championship Game / rivalry)	ABC	W 21–7	80,031
January 1, 2007	7:30 p.m.	vs. No. 9 Boise State*	No. 7	University of Phoenix Stadium; Glendale, AZ (Fiesta Bowl)	FOX	L 42–43 ^{OT}	73,719
*Non-conference game; ^{†}Homecoming; Rankings from AP Poll released prior to the game; All times are in Central time

== Roster ==
In 2006, the Sooners competed with a relatively young team. Oklahoma listed 72 players on the roster and only nine of them were scholarship seniors. Following the dismissal of quarterback Rhett Bomar, fifth-year senior Paul Thompson reconverted back to his former role of quarterback after spending 2005 as a wide receiver. Junior college transfer Joey Halzle was slotted as his backup. Thompson had several wide receivers to look to in 2006, including Malcolm Kelly, Manuel Johnson, and Juaquin Iglesias. Not to mention junior Adrian Peterson, the team's main running back. Most of the Sooners' experience was on the other side of the ball. The Sooner linebackers were the most experienced players on the team. The squad was anchored by Rufus Alexander and Zach Latimer. Alexander was ranked as the third best linebacker in the country at the beginning of the season by College Football News. Behind them were other key players such as Demarrio Pleasant and Lewis Baker. Sophomore Ryan Reynolds, a notable player coming out of high school, was injured in the preseason and therefore was unable to contribute in 2006. In addition to a veteran linebacker squad, Oklahoma had a number of big-name defensive ends. During the preseason, College Football News ranked Larry Birdine, Calvin Thibodeaux and C.J. Ah You in the top 25 best defensive ends for the 2006 season (ranked 14th, 20th, and 22nd, respectively). Oklahoma was the only team with three players in the top 25.

(final)
Wide receivers: 1 Manuel Johnson^{†} – Sophomore; 4 Malcolm Kelly^{†} – Sophomore; 8 Brandon Caleb – Freshman; 9 Juaquin Iglesias – Sophomore; 14 Carter Whitson – (redshirt) Freshman; 17 Eric Huggins – (redshirt) Freshman; 22 Russell English – Sophomore; 27 Garrett Bothun – Junior; 80 Adron Tennell – Freshman; 81 Fred Strong – Sophomore; 84 Quentin Chaney – Sophomore; Offensive line: 50 Jon Cooper^{†} – Sophomore; 60 Curtis Bailey – Freshman; 63 Noah Hughey – Freshman; 71 Trent Williams^{†} – Freshman; 65 Ben Barresi – (redshirt) Freshman; 70 Cory Brandon – Freshman; 72 Duke Robinson – Sophomore; 73 Brandon Walker^{†} – Freshman; 74 Brian Simmons – (redshirt) Freshman; 75 Chase Beeler – Freshman; 76 Branndon Braxton – Sophomore; 77 Sherrone Moore – Junior; 79 Chris Messner^{†} – Senior; Tight ends: 18 Jermaine Gresham – Freshman; 19 Joe Jon Finley^{†} – Junior; 83 Brody Eldridge – (redshirt) Freshman; 87 Aaron Cummings – (redshirt) Freshman; 88 Eric Mensik – Freshman; Fullbacks: 34 Matt Clapp – Sophomore; 45 Dane Zaslaw – Junior; 49 Ian Pleasant – Junior; 83 Brody Eldridge^{†} – (redshirt) Freshman	Quarterbacks: 12 Paul Thompson^{†} – Senior; 14 Sam Bradford – Freshman; 15 Joey Halzle – Sophomore; 16 Hays McEachern – Sophomore; Running backs: 7 DeMarco Murray – Freshman; 13 Mossis Madu – Freshman; 26 Bruce Buckson II - "Freshman"; 21 Jacob Gutierrez – Junior; 23 Allen Patrick – Junior; 28 Adrian Peterson^{†} – Junior; 29 Chris Brown – Freshman; Defensive line: 33 Auston English – Sophomore; 34 Ben Weyand – (redshirt) Freshman; 44 Jeremy Beal – Freshman; 58 Calvin Thibodeaux^{†} – Senior; 68 Carl Pendleton – Junior; 78 Billy Blackard – (redshirt) Freshman; 82 Laenar Nixon – Senior; 85 Tim Johnson – Junior; 86 Adrian Taylor – Freshman; 89 Cordero Moore – (redshirt) Freshman; 90 Steven Coleman^{†} – Junior; 91 Alonzo Dotson – Junior; 92 Larry Birdine – Senior; 93 Gerald McCoy – Freshman; 94 Pryce Macon – Freshman; 95 Alan Davis – Sophomore; 96 DeMarcus Granger – (redshirt) Freshman; 97 Cory Bennett^{†} – Sophomore; 98 John Williams – Junior; 99 C.J. Ah You^{†} – Senior	Linebackers: 8 Ryan Reynolds* – Sophomore; 16 Lewis Baker – Junior; 30 Lamont Robinson – (redshirt) Freshman; 40 Curtis Lofton^{†} – Sophomore; 42 Rufus Alexander^{†} – Senior; 46 Zach Latimer^{†} – Senior; 48 Brandon Crow – Freshman; 51 Demarrio Pleasant – Junior; 53 Kyle Petersen – Sophomore; Defensive backs: 2 Brian Jackson – (redshirt) Freshman; 3 Reggie Smith^{†} – Sophomore; 4 Jonathan Nelson – Freshman; 5 Nic Harris^{†} – Sophomore; 6 Jason Carter – Senior; 11 Lendy Holmes^{†} – Sophomore; 15 Dominique Franks – Freshman; 18 Cortney Carter – Sophomore; 20 Quinton Carter – Freshman; 22 Keenan Clayton – (redshirt) Freshman; 24 Marcus Walker^{†} – Junior; 25 D.J. Wolfe – Junior; 26 Brett Bowers – Sophomore; 41 Darien Williams^{†} – Junior; Punters: 13 Mike Knall – Sophomore; 31 Michael Cohen – Junior; Kickers: 10 Garrett Hartley – Junior; Deep Snapper: 52 Derek Shaw – Freshman
† Starter at position * Injured; did not play in 2006.

== Coaching staff ==
Name	Position	Years at OU
Bob Stoops	Head coach	8
Brent Venables	Associate head coach Defensive coordinator Linebackers	8
Bobby Jack Wright	Assistant head coach Co-defensive coordinator Defensive backs	8
Kevin Wilson	Offensive coordinator Tight ends/fullbacks	5
Casey Glenn	Offensive line ga	2
Cale Gundy	Recruiting coordinator Running backs	8
Kevin Sumlin	Co-offensive coordinator Receivers	5
Josh Heupel	Quarterbacks	3
James Patton	Offensive line	1
Jackie Shipp	Defensive line	8
Chris Wilson	Defensive ends	2

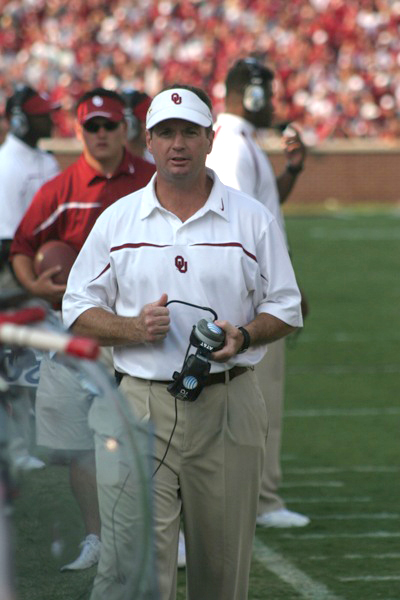
Bob Stoops, head coach of Oklahoma.

Bob Stoops returned for his eighth season as Oklahoma's head coach. During the off-season, he was once again mentioned as a candidate for positions outside of Oklahoma. While Stoops decided to stay in Norman, the rest of the Oklahoma coaching staff did see some changes. The biggest change came at the offensive coordinator position. Former offensive coordinator Chuck Long left Oklahoma to take the head coaching job at San Diego State University. Stoops chose somebody already on the staff to fill Long's spot. Kevin Wilson was named the new offensive coordinator after previously serving as the co-offensive coordinator along with Long as well as the offensive line coach. Rejoining the staff was former Sooner quarterback Josh Heupel, who led Oklahoma to the 2000 National Championship. Heupel had served two years as a graduate assistant before taking a position with Mike Stoops, Bob Stoops's brother, at the University of Arizona in 2005. Heupel took over Long's old position of quarterback coach. Leaving the staff was Darrell Wyatt, who spent four years as the wide receivers coach. He took a position with the NFL's Minnesota Vikings. This move launched another reshuffle of duties on Stoops's staff. Coach Kevin Sumlin took over Wyatt's duties with the wide receivers and was also named co-offensive coordinator with Wilson. Coach James Patton was hired on from Northwestern to take over Wilson's duties with the offensive line.

== Game summaries ==
=== UAB ===
UAB Blazers at #10 Oklahoma Sooners

Team	1	2	3	4	Total
UAB	0	7	10	0	17
• #10 Oklahoma	7	0	14	3	24

- Date: September 2
- Location: Gaylord Family Oklahoma Memorial Stadium, Norman, OK
- Game start: 6:05 p.m. CST
- Elapsed time: 3:16
- Game attendance: 84,555
- Referee: James Hatfield
- TV announcers (TBS): Ron Thulin (Play-by-play), Charles Davis (Color), & Craig Sager (Sideline)

The Sooners began their season on September 2 against the UAB Blazers coached by Watson Brown. The Sooners' offense performed well with quarterback Paul Thompson completing 58% of his passes for 227 yards. Heisman hopeful Adrian Peterson performed well also, rushing for 139 yards, plus an additional 69-yard reception and two touchdowns. However, the Oklahoma defense did not perform as well as expected, giving up over 300 yards of offense. Bob Stoops himself said that "they weren't nearly as good as they were billed to be." Nevertheless, Oklahoma avoided another opening game upset and won 24–17.

=== Washington ===
Washington Huskies at #15 Oklahoma Sooners

Team	1	2	3	4	Total
Washington	7	6	0	7	20
• #15 Oklahoma	7	6	17	7	37

- Date: September 9
- Location: Gaylord Family Oklahoma Memorial Stadium, Norman, OK
- Game start: 2:35 p.m. CST
- Elapsed time: 3:32
- Game attendance: 84,577
- Referee: Greg Burks
- TV announcers (ABC): Brad Nessler (Play-by-play), Bob Griese (Color), Paul Maguire (Color), & Bonnie Bernstein (Sideline)

On September 9, the Sooners took on the Huskies of Washington coached by Tyrone Willingham. Washington began with the ball and on the opening offensive play, Kenny James squeezed through Oklahoma's line and dodged Keenan Clayton's tackle to race 54 yards for a touchdown. Before the end of the 1st quarter, Paul Thompson hit wide receiver Malcolm Kelly in the back of the endzone to tie the game 7–7. Washington answered with a field goal early in the 2nd quarter and Oklahoma and Washington continued to trade field goals to end the 1st half tied 13–13. Oklahoma, however, came out strong in the second half and took the game away from the Huskies. Oklahoma scored 24 consecutive points before Washington scored a late-game touchdown to bring the final score in favor of Oklahoma, 37–20.

Adrian Peterson continued his march up the Oklahoma record books with 165 rushing yards. Peterson was named the Big 12's Offensive Player of the Week for his performance. Quarterback Paul Thompson improved over his season debut, going 21-for-33 including 9-for-11 in the second half. Some began to see the emergence of a "dynamic trio" in Thompson, Peterson, and Kelly.

=== Oregon ===
#15 Oklahoma Sooners at #18 Oregon Ducks

Team	1	2	3	4	Total
#15 Oklahoma	3	3	14	13	33
• #18 Oregon	10	3	0	21	34

- Date: September 16
- Location: Autzen Stadium, Eugene, OR
- Game start: 2:36 p.m. CST
- Elapsed time: 4:30
- Game attendance: 59,269
- Referee: David Cutaia
- TV announcers (ABC): Dan Fouts (Play-by-play), Tim Brant (Color), & Jack Arute (Sideline)

Heading into the game against Mike Bellotti's Oregon Ducks, Oklahoma defensive coordinator Brent Venables made some major changes to the defensive depth chart after giving up four long running plays through the heart of the defensive line against Washington. The starters at defensive tackle, cornerback, and strong safety were all demoted, opening opportunities for some freshmen to step up. D.J. Wolfe was replaced by Marcus Walker at cornerback while senior Jason Carter started in place of Keenan Clayton at strong safety. Carter replaced Clayton in the game against Washington after a missed tackle by the freshman led to a Husky touchdown on their first offensive play. Even though all four players at defensive tackle had almost the same number of plays, Steven Coleman was moved off the top of the depth chart as well.

After a controversial ending, the Oregon Ducks defeated the Oklahoma Sooners 34–33 giving Oklahoma their first loss of the season and making their record 2–1. Oklahoma led Oregon by 13 points late in the game, but Oregon scored a touchdown with 72 seconds remaining, bringing the score to 27–33 in favor of Oklahoma. Oregon then tried for an onside kick and was awarded the ball by the officiating crew despite an Oklahoma player ending up with the ball and over the protests of the Oklahoma sideline who claimed that the ball did not travel the required 10 yards before being touched by Oregon. The instant replay officials took several minutes to review the call while the on-air commentators came to the conclusion that the ball should go to Oklahoma, effectively giving Oklahoma the win as well. The officials, however, awarded the ball to Oregon. ESPN called the decision an "obvious mistake". The network also questioned the Pac-10 policy of using conference officiating crews for inter-conference games. Other conferences typically use neutral officials or ones from the visiting team's conference, although Big 12 officials were used for Oklahoma's non conference games against UAB and the University of Washington. The Oregon offense then drove down the field and scored the go ahead touchdown to go up 34–33. Oklahoma would return a squib kick 55 yards to the Oregon 27 yard line setting themselves up to try a 44-yard field goal attempt on the last play of the game. Garrett Hartley's kick was blocked, sealing Oregon's win.

Oklahoma President David Boren wrote a letter to Big 12 commissioner Kevin Weiberg asking for the loss to be erased from Oklahoma's record, something that Weiberg did not support. Weiberg did say that he would raise concerns about the Pac-10 policy of using their own officials for inter-conference games in Pac-10 stadiums. Bob Stoops said that he may cancel the 2008 game scheduled at Washington if the Pac-10 officiating policy is not changed.

The Pac-10 conference suspended the entire officiating crew, including both on-field and instant-reply officials, for one game. The replay official, Gordon Riese, requested and was granted a leave of absence for the remainder of the season. Reise was quoted as saying, "I feel so bad I missed that call, it's driving me crazy," and that he was "struggling" with his mistake. On-field official David Cutaia had his suspension delayed so that he could officiate the September 23rd game between the University of Southern California and the University of Arizona due to a shortage of Pac-10 conference officials.

Mike Stoops, the Arizona head coach and brother to Oklahoma head coach Bob Stoops, said he felt it "was ridiculous that they couldn't get all of the angles. It was pretty obvious, and not to see that Oklahoma had recovered those were just errors that are the fundamentals of refereeing," He said he favored changing the Pac-10 rules so that out-of-conference officials will be brought in for non-conference games.

Those calling for the move from conference-paid officials to officials working in a national pool included Texas Longhorns coach Mack Brown. His defending national championship team was called for a record number of penalties in a game against Rice. Brown said "You find when you go outside your league sometimes, people call things differently than our league... Believe it or not, there are still a lot of different interpretations that make it uncomfortable some during a ballgame." Less supportive of Oklahoma was Bob Knight, head basketball coach of the Texas Tech Red Raiders. Knight had called for Oklahoma to forfeit its basketball game against Tech in 2003, when the Sooners won 69–64 because of two bad timekeeping decisions. The controversial Knight stated "...[H]ad Oklahoma forfeited that game against us like I suggested, they would have gotten far more positive publicity out of that than if they had gone to the Final Four that year. Now I guess the 'duck' is swimming in the other pond."

=== Middle Tennessee ===
Middle Tennessee Blue Raiders at #17 Oklahoma Sooners

Team	1	2	3	4	Total
Middle Tennessee	0	0	0	0	0
• #17 Oklahoma	24	21	7	7	59

- Date: September 23
- Location: Gaylord Family Oklahoma Memorial Stadium, Norman, OK
- Game start: 6:06 p.m. CST
- Elapsed time: 2:43
- Game attendance: 84,326
- Referee: Tom Walker
- TV announcers (PPV): Mitch Holthus (Play-by-play), Dean Blevins (Color), & Sean Kelly (Sideline)

The Middle Tennessee Blue Raiders (2–1) were relatively new to Division I-FBS having joined the Sun Belt Conference in 2000 after one year as an independent. Oklahoma and the Blue Raiders had not played against each other before. The Blue Raiders' star players (linebacker J.K. Sabb, a Butkus Award hopeful at the beginning of the season, and quarterback Clint Marks, who was on the list for the Davey O'Brien Award) had mixed results against their counterparts from Oklahoma. Marks ended the day 3-for-9 with 40 yards and an interception, but Sabb was able to make a game-high 6 solo tackles with four tackles for loss. Other than linebacker coach Art Kaufman, all of the Middle Tennessee coaches were in their first year at the school (including head coach Rick Stockstill).

Malcolm Kelly broke a school record for receiving yards in a quarter that had stood since 1962 when he pulled down 134 yards in the first. He ended the day with 164 yards on 5 receptions and one touchdown. Adrian Peterson gained 128 yards on 27 carries and did not play after Oklahoma's first possession of the second half. Coach Stoops forced him to sit out because of the chance that "something freakish could happen" and he would be unavailable for the game against Texas. Paul Thompson had a good day as well, throwing 13-for-18 for 257 yards and three touchdowns. On defense, linebacker Zach Latimer and cornerback Nic Harris each had an interception; Latimer returned his 22 yards for a touchdown while Harris was pushed out at the one-yard line.

Oklahoma had 462 total yards of offense (272 through the air, 190 on the ground) while limiting MTSU to only 95 total yards. The 59 point loss was the largest for the Blue Raiders since 1933.

=== Texas (Red River Rivalry) ===
#7 Texas Longhorns vs. #14 Oklahoma Sooners

Team	1	2	3	4	Total
• #7 Texas	7	0	14	7	28
#14 Oklahoma	0	10	0	0	10

- Date: October 7
- Location: Cotton Bowl, Dallas, TX
- Game start: 2:38 p.m. CST
- Elapsed time: 3:12
- Game attendance: 76,260
- Referee: Cooper Castleberry
- TV announcers (ABC): Brad Nessler (Play-by-play), Bob Griese (Color), Paul Maguire (Color), & Bonnie Bernstein (Sideline)

The Longhorns and the Sooners met at the Cotton Bowl in Dallas for their annual rivalry game known as the Red River Rivalry (previously called the Red River Shootout). This marked the 101st meeting between the schools. Texas came into the game leading the series 56–39–5 overall and 44–35–4 at the Cotton Bowl. In 2005, the Longhorns broke a five-year losing streak on their way to win the national championship in the Rose Bowl against USC.

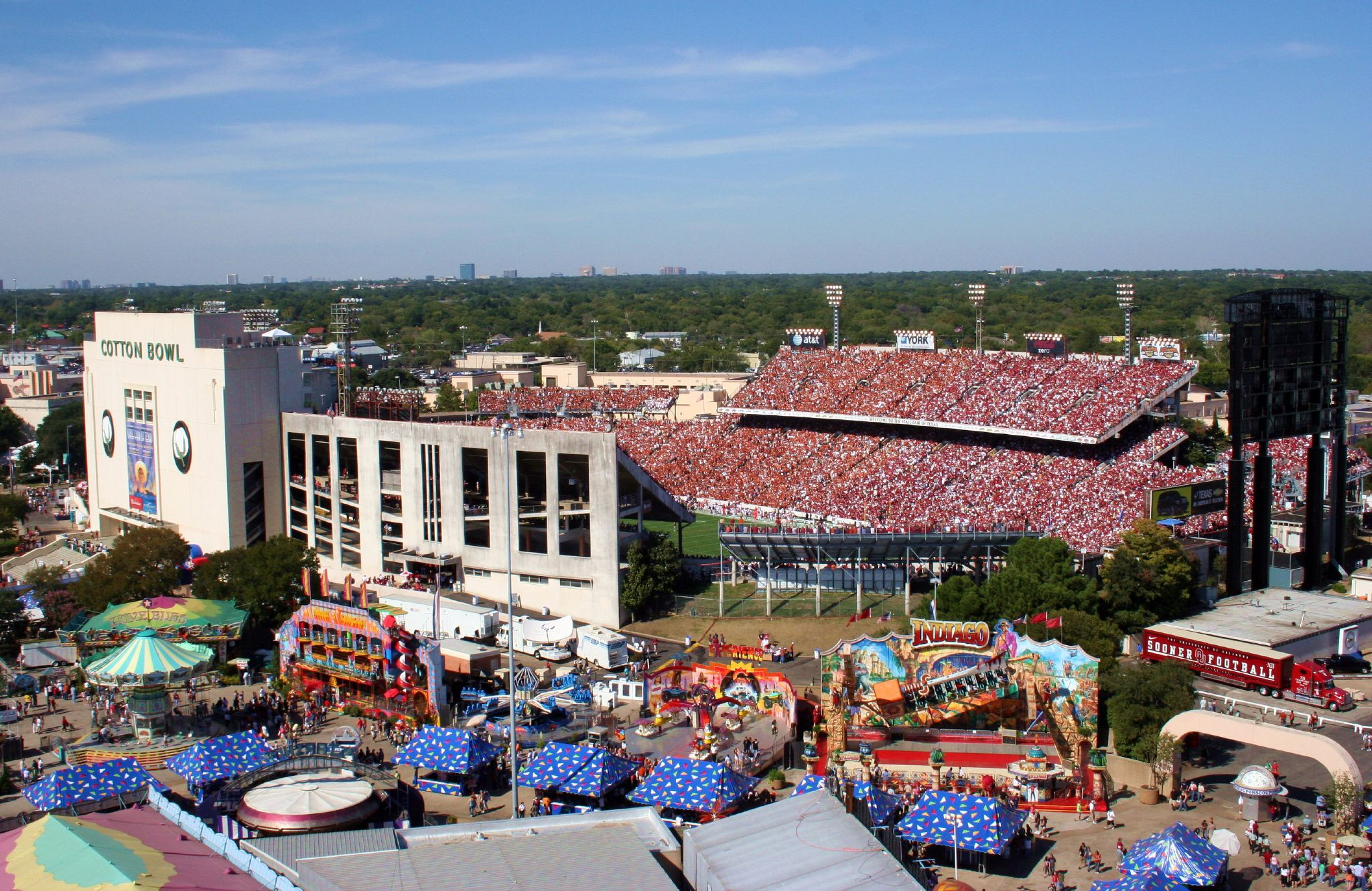
2006 Red River Rivalry viewed from the Ferris wheel of the State Fair of Texas.

The teams alternate home and away each year, and this year the Sooners played host. They occupied the bench under the press box and wore their red home jerseys while Texas wore their all-white road uniform. The stadium, as usual, was split down the 50-yard line with Sooner fans sitting on the south side of mid-field. The division is visually striking and the difference in crowd noise levels from one end of the stadium to the other almost always has a direct impact on the game.

As intense as the rivalry between the schools is, there were many factors that tied the programs together in 2006. Texas head coach Mack Brown was the offensive coordinator for the Sooners in 1984 (the Red River Shootout ended in a 15–15 tie that year). He is also the brother of UAB head coach Watson Brown, who lost to Oklahoma at the beginning of the 2006 season. Oklahoma co-defensive coordinator and defensive backs coach Bobby Jack Wright was an assistant coach at Texas from 1986 to '97. Oklahoma also had two Austin natives on their roster, QB Hays McEachern and WR Fred Strong. McEachern's father was the Texas quarterback in 1977 and 1978 and his mother was a Longhorn cheerleader.

There were few bright points for the Sooners after half-time in this installment of the Red River Rivalry. Though they held the Longhorns to only a single offensive yard in the second quarter, the defense gave up two big pass plays on Texas' first series of the third, including a 33-yard touchdown pass to Limas Sweed that broke the defense's will. The offense seemed equally under-motivated in the second half, going three-and-out on their opening drive. Oklahoma also committed numerous turnovers in the second half, including a bad lateral pass that turned into a Texas touchdown, and two interceptions of quarterback Paul Thompson.

Texas quarterback Colt McCoy had solid, albeit mediocre, numbers, but was central to the drive that put the Longhorns ahead for good. Bob Stoops said after the game that McCoy "managed the game for [Texas] in a really good way." Texas' defense was also able to shut down Adrian Peterson and limit him to only 109 yards and one long run (a 29-yard touchdown run up the middle in the second quarter). Oklahoma's star wide receiver Malcolm Kelly was limited to only two catches for 31 yards.

=== Iowa State ===
Iowa State Cyclones at #23 Oklahoma Sooners

Team	1	2	3	4	Total
Iowa State	7	0	2	0	9
• #23 Oklahoma	14	10	3	7	34

- Date: October 14
- Location: Gaylord Family Oklahoma Memorial Stadium, Norman, OK
- Game start: 11:41 a.m. CST
- Elapsed time: 2:58
- Game attendance: 84,152
- Referee: Jon Bible
- TV announcers (FSN): Joel Meyers (Play-by-play), Dave Lapham (Color), & Jim Knox (Sideline)

Both teams came into this game after losses the previous week. Iowa State dropped to 3–3 (0–2 Big 12) with a 28–14 loss to Nebraska in Ames. There were three Cyclone touchdowns negated by the officials in that game (one called caught out of bounds, two on offensive penalties). Oklahoma lost to Texas for the second straight year in the Red River Rivalry in Dallas and was unable to mount a successful offensive drive for the entire second half. The Sooners also committed 11 penalties (a full third of their season total at the time) and five turnovers in that game. After equally disappointing weeks, both teams were looking to rebound.

Oklahoma held a significant advantage in contests between the schools with the series record at 65–5–2. Iowa State had not won in Norman since 1990 and had dropped nine straight games to the Sooners. The Cyclones' head coach Dan McCarney was 0–5 against Oklahoma while Bob Stoops was 3–0 against Iowa State and 22–3 against teams from the North Division of the Big 12.

Iowa State took some outstanding players to Norman, but in the end it was not enough to win. Quarterback Brent Meyer was the all-time leader in passing yards and total offense at ISU. He finished the season with the Cyclone record for career touchdowns as well. Meyer was complemented by wide receiver Todd Blythe who led the nation in career yards per catch (19.0) and was fifth on the career touchdown receptions list (25) before the game. ISU linebacker Alvin Bowen also led the nation in tackles per game this season and had 17 against Nebraska. The special teams of the Cyclones was led by Ryan Baum who was averaging 18.0 yards per punt return and had scored one touchdown.

A win by Oklahoma where they never trailed was marred by an injury to Adrian Peterson. At the end of a 53-yard run in the fourth quarter, Peterson dove into the end zone and, as Stoops put it, "when he landed, he landed wrong." The result was a broken collarbone that put him on the sideline for the remainder of the regular season. During the post-game press conference Stoops said, "the earliest [Peterson] would be ready to play would be a bowl game." This put an end to Peterson's chase of the Oklahoma all-time rushing record; he was 150 yards from breaking Billy Sims' mark set in 1979 at the time.

Other Sooners also had big days against Iowa State. Paul Thompson went 16 of 27 for 195 yards and two touchdowns, both to Malcolm Kelly. Kelly had a total of four receptions for 50 yards on the day while sophomore Manuel Johnson had four grabs for 48 yards. Linebacker Rufus Alexander pulled down his first interception of the season in the third quarter. Iowa State's only offensive points came on a 31-yard touchdown pass late in the first quarter from Meyer to standout receiver Todd Blythe.

=== Colorado ===
Colorado Buffaloes (1–6) at #20 Oklahoma Sooners (4–2)

Quarter	1	2	3	4	Total
Colorado	0	0	0	3	3
Oklahoma	10	0	0	14	24

at Gaylord Family Oklahoma Memorial Stadium • Norman, Oklahoma

- Date: October 21
- Game time: 6:00 p.m. CDT
- Game weather: Overcast • 46 °F (8 °C) • Wind N 24 miles per hour (39 km/h; 21 kn)
- Game attendance: 84,443
- Referee: Clete Blakeman
- TV announcers (FSN): Joel Meyers, Dave Lapham, & Jim Knox
- Game Summary

Game information

Colorado

- Bernard Jackson
  3/14, 39 Yds, INT
  10 Rush, 54 Yds
- Cody Crawford
  1 Rec, 22 Yds

Oklahoma

- Paul Thompson
  17/26, 105 Yds, TD
- Allen Patrick
  35 Rush, 110 Yds, TD
- Malcolm Kelly
  7 Rec, 64 Yds

This week was homecoming for the Sooners, and there were some special celebrations planned. All season, Oklahoma had been remembering and recognizing the career of the late Prentice Gautt, the first African-American football player at the university. Gautt's jersey number (38) was not issued this season to any players and for the game against Colorado the 38 yard-line on both halves of the field was highlighted with crimson. This year also marked the 50th anniversary of the 1956 National Championship won by the Sooners. At least 34 members of that team were expected to attend the game, including former All-Americans Bill Krisher, Tommy McDonald, and Clendon Thomas.

Going into the game, the series between Oklahoma and Colorado stood at 38–16–2 with the Sooners taking the advantage. Stoops was 4–1 against Colorado with a four-game winning streak. Before the first of those wins (in Norman on November 2, 2002), the Sooners dropped nine straight games to the Buffs, the most consecutive losses to a single opponent in the history of the program. Two of Stoops's wins over Colorado came in Big 12 Championship games (2002 and 2004). Colorado coach Dan Hawkins was in his first year at the school and had not coached against Oklahoma before.

From the beginning, this game went heavily in the Sooner's favor. Both defenses played well, but Oklahoma's squad was able to limit Colorado to only 113 total yards, 51 of which came on the Buff's only scoring drive late in the fourth quarter. Oklahoma's offense was also held down, totaling only 271 yards mostly on runs and short underneath passes. Allen Patrick, filling in for the injured Adrian Peterson, was the player of the game and was the first person all season to run for over 100 yards against Colorado. He managed 110 yards on 35 carries with one touchdown run early in the fourth. For 218 consecutive games across 18 years, the Buffaloes had not been shut out; kicker Mason Crosby saved the streak with a 39-yard field goal into the wind late in the game.

Scoring summary

Quarter	Time	Drive			Team	Scoring information	Score	
Quarter	Time	Plays	Yards	TOP	Team	Scoring information	COL	OKLA
1	7:49	12	61	5:20	Oklahoma	Manuel Johnson 3-yard touchdown reception from Paul Thompson, Garrett Hartley kick good	0	7
1	0:04	6	17	2:17	Oklahoma	46-yard field goal by Garrett Hartley	0	10
4	10:26	12	54	4:51	Oklahoma	Allen Patrick 2-yard touchdown run, Garrett Hartley kick good	0	17
4	6:13	11	51	4:00	Colorado	39-yard field goal by Mason Crosby	3	17
4	0:17	12	43	5:49	Oklahoma	Chris Brown 4-yard touchdown run, Garrett Hartley kick good	3	24
"TOP" = time of possession. For other American football terms, see Glossary of American football.							3	24

=== Missouri ===
#19 Oklahoma Sooners at #23 Missouri Tigers

Team	1	2	3	4	Total
• #19 Oklahoma	7	9	7	3	26
#23 Missouri	3	0	7	0	10

- Date: October 28
- Location: Faurot Field, Columbia, MO
- Game start: 11:10 a.m. CST
- Elapsed time: 3:15
- Game attendance: 62,045
- Referee: Tom Walker
- TV announcers (ABC): Brent Musburger (Play-by-play), Bob Davie (Color), & Lisa Salters (Sideline)

Gary Pinkel's Missouri team was the surprise of the conference in 2006, having already matched their win total from the previous year. They shared the lead for the Big 12 North division with Nebraska (who they lost to November 4 in Lincoln). The Tigers won their homecoming game against Kansas State 41–21. The Sooners also won their homecoming game against Colorado by a score of 24–3. This was the beginning of a long road stretch for Oklahoma; they played four of their last five games on the road. This was the 91st meeting between the schools with the Sooners holding the advantage 63–23–5.

In the words of Coach Bob Stoops, the Sooners played "opportunistic" football against Missouri; converting four take-aways into 19 points (and adding a touchdown on a drive that saw new life after a "roughing the kicker" penalty) to beat the Tigers in Columbia. It was the first home loss of the season for Missouri and broke an eight-game home winning streak that stretched back into the 2005 season.

Missouri quarterback Chase Daniel was 23 for 44 with 248 yards and no touchdowns, but he did throw three interceptions. Daniel rushed 20 times for 75 yards and a TD while the rest of the Tigers' offense was only able to add one rushing yard on seven carries. The Sooners' QB Paul Thompson went 11 for 19 with two touchdowns and no interceptions. He also ran for 28 yards and a score while Allen Patrick added 162 yards on 36 carries. Meanwhile, Malcolm Kelly became the fastest player in Oklahoma history to reach 1,000 career receiving yards, after only his 19th game.

=== Texas A&M ===
#18 Oklahoma Sooners at #21 Texas A&M Aggies

Team	1	2	3	4	Total
• #18 Oklahoma	14	0	3	0	17
#21 Texas A&M	3	7	0	6	16

- Date: November 4
- Location: Kyle Field, College Station, TX
- Game start: 7:14 p.m. CST
- Elapsed time: 3:09
- Game attendance: 85,697
- Referee: Wes White
- TV announcers (ABC): Brent Musburger (Play-by-play), Bob Davie (Color), Kirk Herbstreit (Color), & Lisa Salters (Sideline)

This game was Bob Stoops's 100th as head coach at Oklahoma; it was also the 25th meeting between the programs. The Sooners held a narrow 14–10 lead in the series going into the game, though A&M had won five of the eight played in College Station. Both the Sooners and the Aggies were coming off a four-game winning streak.

The two programs were very similar in their offensive philosophies. Texas A&M came in averaging a very balanced 213.7 yards per game rushing and 209.1 passing while the Sooners averaged 178.4 yards on the ground and 204.8 through the air. Oklahoma was surrendering an average of 36 fewer yards per game on defense.

The game started well for the Sooners. Allen Patrick had 101 yards on 14 carries and Oklahoma scored two touchdowns in the first quarter to A&M's one field goal. After Oklahoma failed to recover an early surprise onside kick, however, the Aggies closed the gap to 4 points with a scoring drive capped by a one-yard rumble from running back Jorvorskie Lane. The defenses stiffened in the second half and both teams had to settle for field goals in the third and fourth quarters. In his second risky call of the game, Stoops had the Sooners attempt to convert a fourth-and-inches with 1:29 left to play and the ball almost to the offense's 30 yard line. The run by Thompson was successful but unnecessary as A&M was penalized for having too many men on the field and Oklahoma was able to run out the clock.

Paul Thompson had a disappointing day as he completed only three of his twelve passing attempts for a total of 39 yards. A&M's Stephen McGee was slightly better completing 8 of 18 for 63 yards, though he was picked off by Marcus Walker in the third quarter; Garrett Hartley kicked a field goal after the Sooners offense could not advance the ball after the turnover. The Aggies forced two fumbles of their own (one from Patrick and one from Thompson), but they were forced to punt after their own offense was also stymied. The player of the game was Allen Patrick, who finished the day with a career-high 173 yards on 32 carries and one touchdown. However, he suffered a sprained ankle during the last minutes of the game. Coach Wilson questioned whether he would be 100% for the next game. Texas A&M coach Dennis Franchione dropped to 0–4 against the Sooners.

=== Texas Tech ===
Texas Tech Raiders at #17 Oklahoma Sooners

Team	1	2	3	4	Total
Texas Tech	7	17	0	0	24
• #17 Oklahoma	3	14	3	14	34

- Date: November 11
- Location: Gaylord Family Oklahoma Memorial Stadium, Norman, OK
- Game start: 6:10 p.m. CST
- Elapsed time: 3:19
- Game attendance: 85,313
- Referee: Jon Bible
- TV announcers (FSN): Joel Meyers (Play-by-play), Dave Lapham (Color), & Jim Knox (Sideline)

Scoring summary
1	OU	9:51	Garrett Hartley 28-yard field goal	OU 3–0
1	4:20	TTU	Robert Johnson 20-yard pass from Graham Harrell (Alex Trlica kick)	TTU 7–3
2	14:53	OU	Manuel Johnson 32-yard pass from Paul Thompson (Garrett Hartley kick)	OU 10–7
2	11:18	TTU	Alex Trlica 32-yard field goal	Tied 10–10
2	9:25	TTU	Robert Johnson 6-yard pass from Graham Harrell (Alex Trlica kick)	TTU 17–10
2	1:43	TTU	Antonio Huffman 54-yard interception return (Alex Trlica kick)	TTU 24–10
2	0:10	OU	Malcolm Kelly 40-yard pass from Paul Thompson (Garrett Hartley kick)	TTU 24–17
3	4:50	OU	Garrett Hartley 23-yard field goal	TTU 24–20
4	12:51	OU	Chris Brown 40-yard run (Garrett Hartley kick)	OU 27–24
4	2:21	OU	Chris Brown 2-yard run (Garrett Hartley kick)	OU 34–24

Oklahoma played its last home game of the season against Texas Tech (coached by former Oklahoma assistant Mike Leach), and bid farewell to the smallest class of seniors in Stoops's tenure as head coach. The previous smallest class was 12 in 2001; this year there were eleven (nine on scholarship). During the pre-game ceremony, all the seniors and their families were introduced and the Don Key Award was presented to quarterback Paul Thompson. Going into the game, the series between the two schools was 10–3 in favor of Oklahoma, and the Red Raiders had not won in Norman in 10 years.

With Adrian Peterson still recovering from breaking his collar bone against Iowa State and Allen Patrick on the sidelines in an ankle brace after suffering a late-game sprain the week before, many aspects of the offense were in doubt coming into this game. Paul Thompson responded by putting up a career-high 309 yards passing, completing 24 of 31 attempts. True-freshman running back Chris Brown also stepped up to the challenge and ran for 84 yards and two touchdowns, both in the fourth quarter; this was the first time in 16 games that a Sooner back did not run for over 100 yards.

The only serious injury of the game came when wide receiver Manuel Johnson was knocked unconscious after hitting helmets with Texas Tech defensive back Chris Parker. Johnson was unresponsive on the sidelines for about 35 seconds before he opened his eyes. He was taken to the hospital by ambulance, treated for "a real bad concussion," and kept overnight. According to Coach Stoops, Johnson would not play against Baylor, but he returned for the regular season finale.

Tech played well also, especially on defense where they were able to create four turnovers including Thompson's first interception in 99 pass attempts. Defensive back Antonio Huffman returned the pick 54 yards for a touchdown and put the Red Raiders up 24–10 late in the second quarter. Texas Tech was able to capitalize on the other take-aways as well, turning them into 14 more points and held the lead until the fourth quarter. Two missed field goals and a fired-up Sooner defense held the Red Raiders off, however, and the Sooners were able to put the game away with a two-yard touchdown run by Brown.

=== Baylor ===
#16 Oklahoma Sooners at Baylor Bears

Team	1	2	3	4	Total
• #16 Oklahoma	13	0	23	0	36
Baylor	3	0	0	7	10

- Date: November 18
- Location: Floyd Casey Stadium, Waco, TX
- Game start: 11:10 a.m. CST
- Elapsed time: 2:56
- Game attendance: 31,221
- Referee: Drew George
- TV announcers (FSN): Bill Land (Play-by-play), Gary Reasons (Color), & Jim Knox (Sideline)

The Baylor game marked the beginning of a two-game stretch of road games to finish the season for Oklahoma. The Sooners traveled to Baylor in Waco for the 16th meeting between the schools and the seventh at Floyd Casey Stadium. Oklahoma had never lost to the Bears, though the game in 2005 in Norman went into double-overtime. This was the last game of the season for Baylor; even with a win they would not be bowl-eligible.

Baylor's passing offense had been strong all year. This was the first time they had been held below 21 points in their last seven conference games and they had two wide receivers with over 50 catches each. Unfortunately for the Bears, their starting quarterback Shawn Bell suffered a season-ending injury against Texas A&M on October 28.

Paul Thompson had a career-high 309 passing yards against Texas Tech, including a string of 14 straight completions after throwing his sixth interception of the year. At the time, he was also sixth on the Oklahoma single-season touchdown passes list with 17 and eighth on the season passing yards list with 2,092.

The Sooner defense played extremely well in Waco, limiting Baylor to 148 total yards and −48 yards of rushing. That was the fewest yards Baylor had produced all season and their worst performance on the ground in the program's history; it was also the second-best performance by an Oklahoma defense ever. Defensive back Reggie Smith also pulled down two interceptions, returning the first one 42 yards for a touchdown.

Oklahoma was also unable to avoid turning the ball over, however, losing four fumbles and throwing one pick. Baylor set up a field goal on the first fumble by Smith after he failed to catch a punt return and Baylor's Braelon Davis returned a fumble by Chris Brown for a touchdown late in the game. Another fumble by Smith on a second return and one by Malcolm Kelly put premature ends to other Sooner drives.

=== Oklahoma State (Bedlam Series) ===
#13 Oklahoma Sooners at Oklahoma State Cowboys

Team	1	2	3	4	Total
• #13 Oklahoma	7	6	14	0	27
Oklahoma State	7	0	7	7	21

- Date: November 25
- Location: Boone Pickens Stadium, Stillwater, OK
- Game start: 1:40 p.m. CST
- Elapsed time: 3:02
- Game attendance: 42,819
- Referee: Greg Burks
- TV announcers (FSN): Bill Land (Play-by-play), Gary Reasons (Color), Jim Knox (Sideline), & Emily Jones (Sideline)

Scoring summary
1	9:49	OSU	Dantrell Savage 5-yard run (Jason Ricks kick)	OSU 7–0
1	3:37	OU	Chris Brown 3-yard run (Garrett Hartley kick)	Tie 7–7
2	1:08	OU	Juaquin Iglesias 13-yard pass from Paul Thompson (kick failed)	OU 13–7
3	14:21	OU	Allen Patrick 65-yard run (Garrett Hartley kick)	OU 20–7
3	9:38	OSU	Bobby Reid 1-yard run (Jason Ricks kick)	OU 20–14
3	3:51	OU	Chris Brown 1-yard run (Garrett Hartley kick)	OU 27–14
4	6:41	OSU	D'Juan Woods 2-yard pass from Bobby Reid (Jason Ricks kick)	OU 27–21

The Bedlam Series between Oklahoma and Oklahoma State has been played all but two years since 1904 and is the most lopsided series between schools in the same state in the nation. Going into the game, Oklahoma led the series, 77–16–7. This was the last game of the regular season and held major bowl implications for both programs. Head coach Mike Gundy had managed to bring Oklahoma State to bowl-eligibility with six wins, but they were still not guaranteed a bowl berth. The Big 12 had eight contract bowl spots this year and nine bowl–eligible teams. Since only teams with six wins can be selected for a bowl game after all available teams with seven or more have been selected, OSU needed Kansas to lose to Missouri to have any hope of a bowl game. After Missouri beat the Jayhawks 42–17, both Kansas and OSU had 6–6 records and the bowl selection committees would choose which team would be invited.

Aside from the rivalry and bowl implications, this game also decided who would represent the South Division at the Big 12 Championship Game in Kansas City. At the beginning of the week, Texas and Oklahoma were tied for the lead with Texas holding the tie-breaker due to their win in the Red River Rivalry earlier in the year. However, since Texas lost to Texas A&M on November 24, a Sooner victory at State would win them the division outright and let them play Nebraska for the Big 12 title and a spot in the Fiesta Bowl (awarded contractually to the Big 12 winner if they are not selected to play in the national championship game).

As with the previous five games, the absence of Adrian Peterson did not keep the Sooners from running the ball on the ground. Allen Patrick returned from missing the last two games with a sore ankle and put up 163 yards on 23 carries, including a 65-yard touchdown scamper to start the second half. Chris Brown had an additional 19 carries for 74 yards and two touchdowns as Patrick's backup. At the end of the day, Paul Thompson only threw 11 passes, 7 completions for 77 yards with one touchdown and no interceptions, and Oklahoma had 238 yards of rushing.

Oklahoma State's passing attack was more active, with both Zac Robinson and Bobby Reid completing 8 passes (on 17 attempts for 149 yards for Robinson, 12 and 82 for Reid). However, they were still only able to connect for one touchdown (Reid to D'Jaun Woods in the fourth quarter) and Robinson missed high on a last-second "Hail Mary" that would have tied the game (the PAT would have put the Cowboys up by one with only a few seconds left in the game). The Cowboys were also able to produce 119 yards and two touchdowns on the ground.

=== Nebraska (Big 12 Championship Game) ===
#19 Nebraska Cornhuskers vs. #8 Oklahoma Sooners

Team	1	2	3	4	Total
#19 Nebraska	0	7	0	0	7
• #8 Oklahoma	14	0	7	0	21

- Date: December 2
- Location: Arrowhead Stadium, Kansas City, MO
- Game start: 7:16 p.m. CST
- Elapsed time: 3:40
- Game attendance: 80,031
- Referee: Randy Christal
- TV announcers (ABC): Mike Patrick (Play-by-play), Todd Blackledge (Color), & Holly Rowe (Sideline)

Called "The Battle of the Big Reds", the rivalry between the University of Oklahoma and the University of Nebraska–Lincoln was one of the most heated contests of the old Big Eight Conference. Played every Thanksgiving weekend for 71 years (from 1927 to 1998), this contest produced many memorable games – including the Game of the Century in 1971. The rivalry cooled somewhat since the creation of the Big 12 as Bill Callahan's Nebraska Cornhuskers and Stoops's Oklahoma Sooners were split a home-and-home two of every four years.

This was only the fourth time that the teams had met at a neutral site. The last time was the 1979 Orange Bowl where the Sooners won 31–24. Oklahoma held the lead in the all-time series with 42 wins, 37 losses and 3 ties and had never lost to Nebraska on neutral turf (one 7–7 tie in 1919 in Omaha). Bob Stoops was 3–1 against Nebraska and had a two-game winning streak; Callahan had never beaten Oklahoma.

This was the first time the two teams had met in the Big 12 Championship Game to determine the Big 12 Conference champion. Nebraska played in the championship game three of the first four years, winning in 1997 and 1999, but had not made it back since. Oklahoma missed the first four games but represented the South Division four of the next six years, topping the conference in 2000, 2002, and 2004. Oklahoma had the most appearances in the championship game (5) and conference titles (4) of any team in the Big 12.

Nebraska received the ball to start the game but Maurice Purify fumbled on the first play from scrimmage. Oklahoma recovered the ball at the Nebraska 2-yard-line and scored a touchdown to take the lead 7–0 with 48 seconds expired off the clock. It was the fastest score in Big 12 Championship Game history. With 5:35 left in the first quarter, Oklahoma's quarterback completed a touchdown pass to Malcolm Kelly to go up 14–0. With 4:37 left in the first half, Nebraska's Zach Taylor threw a touchdown pass and the extra point shaved Oklahoma's lead to 14–7, which was still the score as the game went to half-time.

At the start of the half, Oklahoma started with the ball but was unable to advance, as Nebraska recorded their first quarterback sack of the game and caused Oklahoma to punt after going three-and-out. Later in the third quarter, Oklahoma used eleven plays, three minutes and 21 seconds, to go 99 yards and score a touchdown with 1:25 left in the third quarter. It was the longest scoring drive in Big 12 Championship history.

With 8:53 left in the game, Nebraska threw what was almost a touchdown pass, but Nic Harris made a diving catch to intercept the ball in the end-zone for a touchback. Neither team scored in the fourth quarter, so Oklahoma won the game 21–7. It was their fourth Big 12 Conference football championship, which was the most for any team in the conference (Nebraska and Texas each had two).

=== Boise State (Fiesta Bowl) ===
#9 Boise State Broncos vs. #7 Oklahoma Sooners

Team	1	2	3	4	OT	Total
• #9 Boise State	14	7	7	7	8	43
#7 Oklahoma	7	3	7	18	7	42

- Date: January 1
- Location: University of Phoenix Stadium, Glendale, AZ
- Game start: 7:52 p.m. CST
- Elapsed time: 3:58
- Game attendance: 73,719
- Referee: Bill LeMonnier
- TV announcers (FOX): Thom Brennaman (Play-by-play), Barry Alvarez (Color), Charles Davis (Color), & Chris Myers (Sideline)

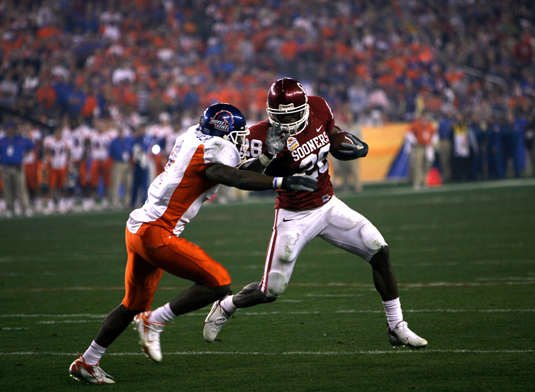
Oklahoma's Adrian Peterson breaks a tackle of Boise State's Gerald Alexander.

Since Oklahoma won the Big 12 Championship game, they represented the Big 12 Conference in the Fiesta Bowl in Glendale, Arizona. Contractually, the Fiesta Bowl hosts the Big 12 Champion and then picks, from among the BCS eligible teams, the opponent. For 2007, the Fiesta Bowl picked Boise State as Oklahoma's opponent. The game took place on New Year's Day in the then-new University of Phoenix Stadium, home of the Arizona Cardinals. The Broncos led the Sooners the majority of the game, but the Sooners made up an 18-point deficit late in the game and led by a touchdown with a minute left in regulation. With 18 seconds left, the Sooners had the Broncos in a fourth-and-18 situation from midfield, but were stunned when the Broncos executed a hook and lateral for the tying score. This would be only the first of three Boise State trick plays that helped elevate this game to epic status.

The Sooners had the ball first in overtime, with Adrian Peterson scoring on their first play. Boise State then drove the ball toward the goal line, but faced fourth-and-two from the five yard line. They then sent quarterback Jared Zabransky into motion and snapped to backup wide receiver Vinny Peretta, who ran an option pass and found Derek Schouman in the end zone. The Broncos chose to go for the two-point conversion and the win instead of kicking for the tie. They then ran a Statue of Liberty play, with Zabransky faking a pass to the right side and handing the ball behind his back to Ian Johnson, who ran left and entered the end zone untouched, giving the Broncos a stunning 43–42 win.

== Rankings ==
Ranking movements Legend: ██ Increase in ranking ██ Decrease in ranking ( ) = First-place votes
	Week															
Poll	Pre	1	2	3	4	5	6	7	8	9	10	11	12	13	14	Final
AP	10	15	15	17	16	14	23	20	19	18	17	16	13	9	12	11
Coaches	5 (13)	10	11	16	16	13	22	20	19	18	17	16	14	10	8	11
Harris	Not released				16	14	23	20	19	18	17	16	14	11	8	Not released
BCS	Not released							22	19	18	17	17	15	15	10	Not released

== Statistics ==
The Sooners led the conference in many defense statistics, including pass efficiency defense, scoring defense, total defense, and sacks allowed. They finished second in rushing defense. They also ranked in the top 20 nationally in all the above categories. The Sooners' weakness came on offense where they finished in the middle of the pack in the conference. The Sooners' rushing offense ranked third in the conference but passing offense ranked tenth, total offense eighth and passing efficiency sixth.

=== Team ===
	OU	Opp
Points per game	30.3	17.3
First downs	257	209
Rushing	110	85
Passing	131	116
Penalty	16	8
Rushing yardage	2,480	1,382
Rushing attempts	557	424
Avg per rush	4.5	3.3
Avg per game	177.1	98.7
Passing yardage	2,682	2,638
Avg per game	191.6	188.4
Completions-Attempts	205–340 (60.3%)	225–434 (51.8%)
Total offense	5,162	4,020
Total plays	897	858
Avg per play	5.8	4.7
Avg per game	368.7	287.1
Fumbles-Lost	33–22	23–14

	OU	Opp
Punts-Yards	62–2,460 (39.7 avg)	85–3,409 (40.1 avg)
Punt returns-Total yards	38–299 (7.9 avg)	20–83 (4.2 avg)
Kick returns-Total yards	37–844 (22.8 avg)	49–853 (17.4 avg)
Onside kicks	0–1 (0%)	2–3 (66.7%)
Avg time of possession per game	31:38	28:27
Penalties-Yards	69–521	77–579
Avg per game	37.2	41.4
3rd down conversions	71/177 (40%)	58/192 (30%)
4th down conversions	7/11 (64%)	10/22 (45%)
Sacks by-Yards	26–203	16–106
Total TDs	52	29
Rushing	25	10
Passing	22	15
Field goals-Attempts	19–20 (95%)	12–17 (70.6%)
PAT-Attempts	49–50 (98%)	28–28 (100%)
Total attendance	587,397	281,051
Games-Avg per game	6–83,914	5–56,210

=== Scores by quarter ===
	1	2	3	4	OT	Total
Opponents	68	54	47	65	8	242
Oklahoma	130	82	119	86	7	424

Statistics from: "Oklahoma Sooners – Cumulative Season Statistics". University of Oklahoma Department of Intercollegiate Athletics. Archived from the original on December 1, 2007.

== After the season ==
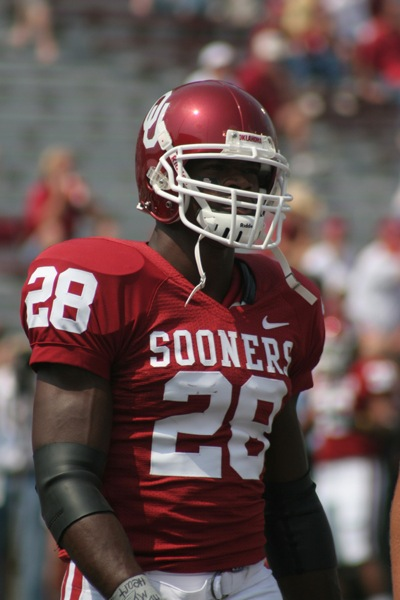
Running back Adrian Peterson finished his career at Oklahoma following the 2006 season.

As the 2006 college football season neared the end, many organizations began to announce finalists and winners of various post-season awards. Sooner players and coaches appeared on many of these lists. Head coach Bob Stoops was unanimously named Coach of the Year on the AT&T All-Big 12 Coaches Team. This was the third time he'd won the award, more than any other coach in the conference. Stoops was also named a finalist for the Eddie Robinson Coach of the Year award, a national award handed out by the Football Writer's Association of America. Oklahoma defensive coordinator/linebacker coach/associate head coach Brent Venables was named one of five finalists for the Broyles Award which goes to the nation's best assistant coach.

Several players for the Sooners were also honored. Oklahoma junior kicker Garrett Hartley was named a finalist for the Lou Groza Award. Oklahoma senior linebacker Rufus Alexander was named the AT&T All-Big 12 Defensive Player of the Year. He was the third Oklahoma player to earn this honor, following Teddy Lehman in 2003 and Roy Williams in 2001. He was also Oklahoma's lone All-American this year was linebacker, and was given first team All-American status by the American Football Coaches Association. The following Oklahoma players were also named to the All–Big 12 First, Second, and Honorable Mention Team:

All-Big 12 First Team
- Adrian Peterson, Jr., RB, 3rd year
- Chris Messner Sr., OL
- C.J. Ah You, Sr., DL
- Larry Birdine, Sr., DL
- Rufus Alexander, Sr., LB, 2nd year

All-Big 12 Second Team
- Malcolm Kelly, So., WR
- Garrett Hartley, Jr., PK
- Marcus Walker Jr., DB
- Nic Harris, So., DB
- Reggie Smith, So., DB

All-Big 12 Honorable Mention Team
- Steven Coleman Jr., DL
- Brody Eldridge, Fr., FB
- Joe Jon Finley Jr., TE
- Lendy Holmes, So., DB
- Zach Latimer, Sr., LB
- Allen Patrick, Jr., RB
- George Robinson, So., OL
- Reggie Smith, So., PK/KR
- Paul Thompson, Sr., QB
- Brandon Walker, Fr., OL
- Darien Williams Jr., DB

Adrian Peterson finished his last season at Oklahoma with 1,012 yards. This brought his career total to 4,045 which placed him third all-time at Oklahoma. He would remain 26 yards behind Joe Washington and 73 yards behind Billy Sims.

== 2007 NFL draft ==
The 2007 NFL draft was held on April 28–29, 2007 at Radio City Music Hall in New York City. The following Oklahoma players were either selected or signed as undrafted free agents following the draft. Adrian Peterson was the highest Sooner drafted since Cedric Jones was drafted as the fifth pick in 1996.

Player	Position	Round	Overall pick	NFL team
Adrian Peterson	RB	1st	7	Minnesota Vikings
Rufus Alexander	LB	6th	176	Minnesota Vikings
C. J. Ah You	DE	7th	239	Buffalo Bills
Paul Thompson	QB	Undrafted		Green Bay Packers
Zach Latimer	LB	Undrafted		Washington Redskins
Larry Birdine	DE	Undrafted		Green Bay Packers
