= 2007 Fiesta Bowl =

2007 Tostitos Fiesta Bowl
- BCS Bowl Game; 36th Fiesta Bowl
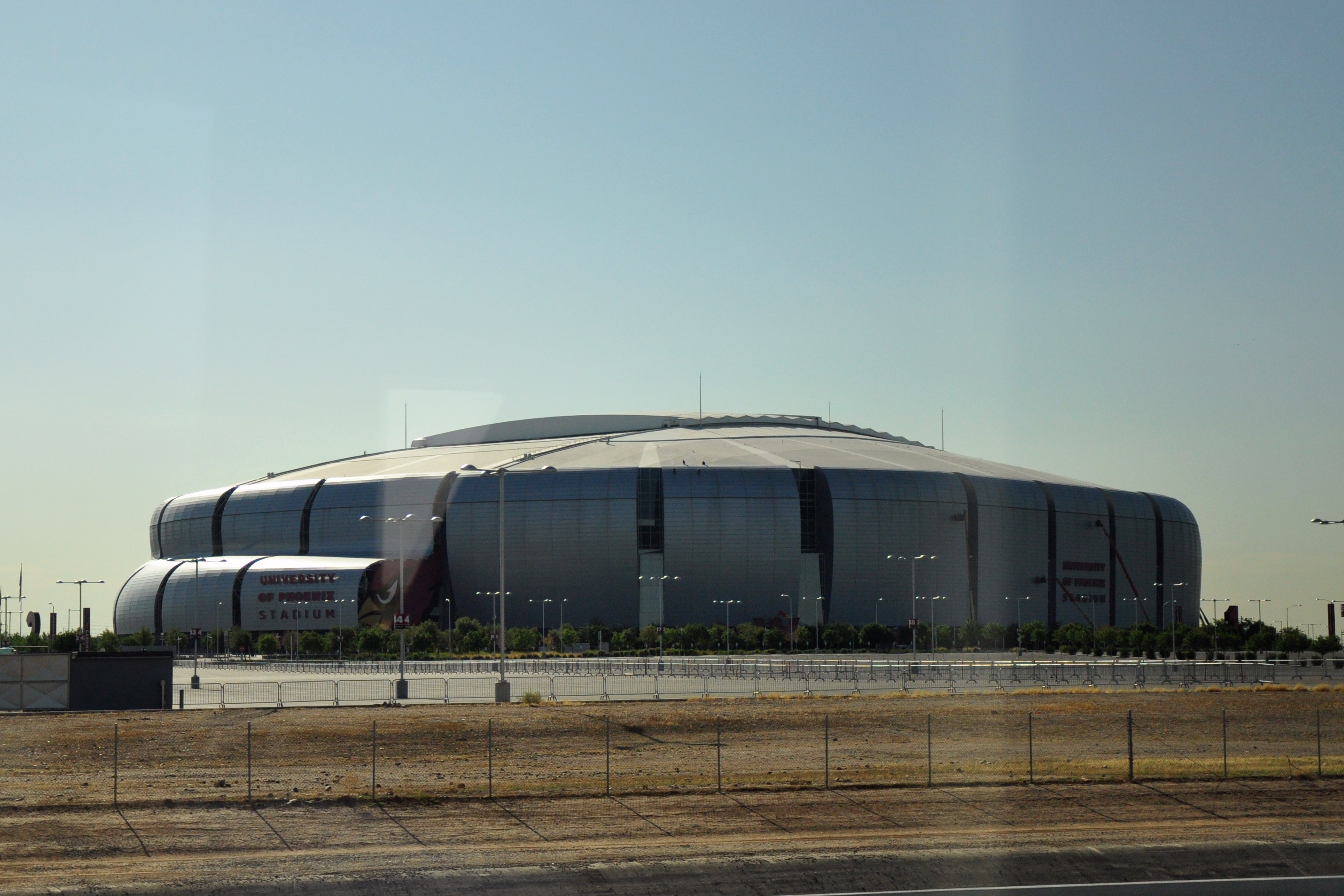
- University of Phoenix Stadium in Glendale, Arizona, hosted the Fiesta Bowl.
Boise State Broncos	Oklahoma Sooners
(12–0)	(11–2)
WAC	Big 12
43	42
Head coach: Chris Petersen	Head coach: Bob Stoops
AP / Coaches / BCS; 9 / 9 / 8	AP / Coaches / BCS; 7 / 8 / 10
	1	2	3	4	OT	Total
Boise State	14	7	7	7	8	43
Oklahoma	7	3	7	18	7	42
- Date: January 1, 2007
- Season: 2006
- Stadium: University of Phoenix Stadium
- Location: Glendale, Arizona
- MVP: Offense: QB Jared Zabransky; Defense: FS Marty Tadman
- Favorite: Oklahoma by 7½
- National anthem: United States Military Academy Glee Club
- Referee: Bill LeMonnier (Big Ten)
- Halftime show: University of Oklahoma and Boise State University marching bands
- Attendance: 73,719

United States TV coverage
- Network: Fox
- Announcers: Thom Brennaman; Barry Alvarez; Charles Davis; Chris Myers
- Nielsen ratings: 8.4

The 2007 Tostitos Fiesta Bowl was a college football bowl game played as part of the 2006–2007 Bowl Championship Series (BCS) of the 2006 NCAA Division I FBS football season. The game was played on January 1, 2007, at its new venue, the University of Phoenix Stadium in Glendale, Arizona. The matchup pitted the Big 12 champion No. 7 Oklahoma Sooners against the WAC champion No. 9 Boise State Broncos. The contest was televised on Fox. With this broadcast, the Fiesta Bowl became the first bowl game to air on all the "big four" television networks (ABC, CBS, Fox, and NBC); the Orange Bowl became the second the following night.

Oklahoma was the designated home team and was favored by 7½ points, but Boise State raced out to a 21–10 halftime lead. The second half featured a memorable series of back-and-forth events: Oklahoma scoring 25 consecutive points to take its first lead of the game with just over one minute remaining, the teams trading 22 points in the final 1:26 of regulation to send the game into overtime, and Boise State completing three do-or-die trick plays (including multiple 4th-down conversions and a two-point conversion) in order to secure the win by one point.

== Pre-game buildup ==
During the summer preceding the season, Oklahoma was hyped to be a top 5 team and national title contender. They initially were the favorite to win the Big 12 South. Following the dismissal of OU's returning quarterback Rhett Bomar, many felt the defending national champion Texas Longhorns were now the favorite (the Sooners dropped six spots in the Coaches Poll during the first two weeks of the season despite winning both of those weeks). The Sooners opened their season 3–2 with a controversial loss to Oregon and a loss to Texas. The Sooners also lost their Heisman-hopeful running back Adrian Peterson during their sixth game to a broken collar bone. Many had written the Sooners off at this point. However, the Sooners won their next seven games while Texas lost their last two and the Sooners became the outright winners of the Big 12 South and faced the Big 12 North winner, Nebraska, in the Big 12 Championship Game. They won that game 21–7 and were given an automatic berth to represent the Big 12 in the Fiesta Bowl.

The Boise State Broncos, who returned more starters from 2005 than any other team in NCAA Division I-A football, began the year with high hopes. First-year head coach Chris Petersen led the program to an undefeated 12–0 record. Some of the Broncos key wins this season came over Oregon State of the Pac-10 Conference, Hawaii and Fresno State. Boise State was the champion of the Western Athletic Conference.

== New stadium ==
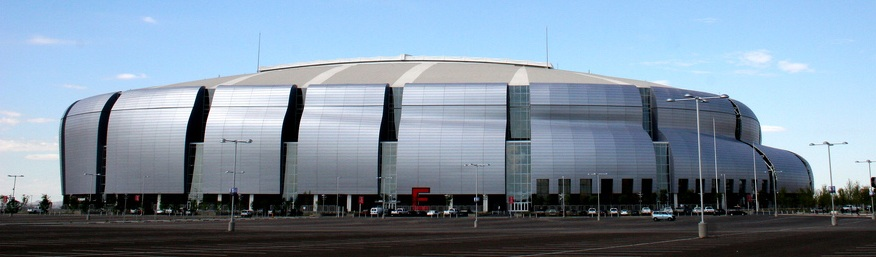
The new University of Phoenix Stadium in Glendale, Arizona is the host stadium of the Tostitos Fiesta Bowl.

The Fiesta Bowl has been played annually since 1971, and from then until 2005 the game was hosted in Tempe, Arizona at Sun Devil Stadium, home stadium to the NFL's Arizona Cardinals and Pac-10's Arizona State Sun Devils. In 2006, the Cardinals completed a new home stadium (named University of Phoenix Stadium) in Glendale, Arizona, and the Fiesta Bowl followed them there. The new stadium is state-of-the-art with an inclined retractable roof and fully retractable natural grass playing surface. The stadium was also host to 2006 season BCS National Championship Game held on January 8, 2007, and hosted Super Bowl XLII in 2008. The capacity of the new stadium is 63,500, although for this game and the BCS National Championship Game, extra seats were added in the south end of the stadium to increase capacity to about 70,000.

== Scoring summary ==
First quarter

- Boise State Drisan James 49 yard touchdown pass from Jared Zabransky. (Anthony Montgomery kick good) (9:06) 7–0 Boise State
- Boise State Ian Johnson 2 yard touchdown run (Montgomery kick good). (7:28) 14–0 Boise State
- Oklahoma Manuel Johnson 7 yard touchdown pass from Paul Thompson (Garrett Hartley kick good). (0:26) 14–7 Boise State

Second quarter

- Oklahoma Garrett Hartley 31 yard field goal. (5:38) 14–10 Boise State
- Boise State Drisan James 32 yard pass from Jared Zabransky (Montgomery kick is good). (0:32) 21–10 Boise State

Third quarter

- Boise State – Paul Thompson pass intercepted by Marty Tadman of Boise State, returned for a 27-yard touchdown (Anthony Montgomery kick good). (8:05) 28–10 Boise State
- Oklahoma – Adrian Peterson 8 yard touchdown run (Hartley kick good). (4:29) 28–17 Boise State

Fourth quarter

- Oklahoma – 28 yard field goal by Garrett Hartley. (14:57). 28–20 Boise State
- Oklahoma – 5 yard touchdown pass from Thompson to Quentin Chaney (2-point conversion good, 6 yard pass from Thompson to Juaquin Iglesias.) (1:26) 28–28 Tie
- Oklahoma – Jared Zabransky pass intercepted by Marcus Walker of Oklahoma, returned for a 34-yard touchdown (Hartley kick good). (1:02). 35–28 Oklahoma
- Boise State – 15 yard pass completed from Zabransky to James. James lateral to Jerard Rabb for the 35 yard touchdown run (Montgomery kick good). (0:07). 35–35 Tie

Overtime

- Oklahoma – 25 yard touchdown run by Peterson. (Hartley kick good). 42–35 Oklahoma
- Boise State – 6 yard touchdown pass from Vinny Perretta to Derek Schouman. (2-point conversion good, 3 yard run by Johnson, Statue of Liberty play). 43–42 Boise State

== Game summary ==
The game was highlighted by Oklahoma scoring 25 consecutive points in the second half to take its first lead with 1:02 remaining, a combined 22 points scored in the final 1:26 of regulation plus 15 points in overtime, and three trick plays that helped Boise State win the game.

Oklahoma fell behind 14–0 early in the first quarter after a costly fumble deep in their own territory by quarterback Paul Thompson, which led to an Ian Johnson touchdown run two plays later. Boise State scored a touchdown on its final possession of the first half to take a 21–10 halftime lead. Midway through the third quarter Boise State intercepted a pass and ran it back for a touchdown, giving them a 28–10 lead.

Oklahoma then scored the next 25 points, starting by recovering a punt that struck the leg of a Boise State player deep in Broncos territory, which a few plays later led to Adrian Peterson scoring his first touchdown of the game to cut the Boise State lead to 28–17. The Sooners followed up with a Garrett Hartley field goal a few series later to close the gap to 28–20.

=== The final 1:26 of regulation ===
Wide receiver Quentin Chaney caught a tipped 5-yard touchdown pass from quarterback Paul Thompson with 1:26 remaining in the fourth quarter, bringing the Sooners to within two points at 28–26 Boise State.

OU then attempted a two-point conversion to tie the game. In a sign of the wildness to come, Oklahoma would require three attempts to complete the two-point conversion:

- OU's first attempt was unsuccessful, but Boise State was called for pass interference.
- OU succeeded on its second attempt, but the play was called back for illegal shift.
- Finally, Thompson completed a pass to wide receiver Juaquin Iglesias on the third attempt, this time with no penalties, thus tying the game at 28.

After the ensuing kickoff on the next play from scrimmage, Boise State quarterback Jared Zabransky was intercepted by Marcus Walker, who returned it 34 yards for a touchdown. After the extra point, Oklahoma led 35–28 with 1:02 left, its first lead of the game.

On the ensuing drive Boise State drove to the OU 42. The next series of downs were not successful for Boise State:

- On first down, Zabransky was sacked for a loss of 8 yards.
- On second down, Zabransky's pass was dropped.
- On third down, Zabransky's pass was incomplete.

Boise State was thus facing fourth down with 18 yards needed for a first down and only 18 seconds left on the clock. Zabransky passed for 15 yards to Drisan James. With five Oklahoma defenders playing a "prevent" style defense to stop a long conversion, James quickly scoop-passed the ball to an in-stride Jerard Rabb, who ran the ball along the left sideline an additional 35 yards for a touchdown. (The hook and lateral play—called "Circus" by Boise State—allowed for at least two more laterals. Johnson and Zabransky had trailed Rabb along the sideline as potential outlets or possibly as blockers.) The extra point tied the game at 35 with just seven seconds remaining in regulation, and the game then went into overtime.

=== Overtime ===
Under college football rules, both teams in overtime are given one possession from their opponent's twenty-five yard line. A coin toss gives one team the choice, offense or defense first, or which end of the field. The winner of the toss generally chooses to be on defense first, to know how many points must be scored to win or tie on their offensive possession. The loser of the toss is left to choose the end of the field—usually the one with the largest proportion of their own team's fans so as to increase the crowd noise while their opponents are on offense. The team that is leading after both possessions is declared the winner and in the event of a tie, there is another overtime session with the order of the offensive and defensive possessions reversed. The end of the field is also changed with each overtime session.

Boise State won the coin toss and opted to play defense first. Oklahoma scored on their first play with a 25-yard run by Peterson, which would ultimately be his last collegiate touchdown and play. The extra point was good, making the score 42–35 Oklahoma. On Boise State's drive, the Broncos came down to 4th and 2 on the Sooners' 5 yard line and decided to run their second trick play, a wide receiver rollout option from a variant of the Wildcat offense. Zabransky ran in motion to his left while backup wide receiver Vinny Perretta, lined up as a running back, took the snap, rolled to his right, then threw a touchdown pass to tight end Derek Schouman, who had lined up as a wide receiver, to bring Boise State within one point at 42–41.

Instead of kicking the extra-point to tie the game and send it into a second overtime, Broncos coach Chris Petersen risked defeat to go for the two-point conversion to win. He ran their third trick play of the night. It was a variation of the Statue of Liberty play known to the team simply as "Statue Left", which was drawn up by backup quarterback Taylor Tharp. Boise State lined up three receivers on the right side. After the snap, Zabransky faked a quick pass to his right with his right hand, then quickly handed off the football backhanded with his left hand to running back Ian Johnson, who ran untouched into the end zone for the conversion and the win.

== Postgame ==
During a postgame interview with FOX Sports on-field analyst Chris Myers, Johnson got down on one knee and proposed to his girlfriend, Boise State head cheerleader Chrissy Popadics, on live TV. Myers, however, spoiled the proposal by mentioning it before Johnson went to a knee. She accepted. Ian did not have a ring with him because he originally planned on proposing to Chrissy at Lagoon on their way home from the Fiesta Bowl, but he could not give up the opportunity to propose on national TV after scoring the game-winning two-point conversion. The couple married on July 28, 2007.

According to Ian Johnson, he received about 30 threatening letters which he handed over to the FBI, from people who objected to his nationally televised interracial marriage proposal at the end of the game. Johnson, who is half-black, and Popadics, who is white, hired security for their wedding due to the threats.

=== Final game facts ===
Boise State finished their season with a perfect 13–0 record, spurring controversy as to whether teams from BCS non-AQ conferences should have an opportunity to play for a national title. Most of the Boise State players and officials that were asked about it in the immediate aftermath of the game downplayed the controversy and claimed they were just happy to participate in the BCS bowls. Some did say they believed they were good enough to play in the National Championship game against the BCS No. 1 Ohio State Buckeyes, who later lost to the Florida Gators. The Broncos ultimately received one first-place vote in the final AP poll of the season, released after the National Championship game.

Boise State also became just the second team from a non-AQ (automatic qualifier) conference team to both play in and win a BCS bowl game (the 2004 Utah Utes team was the first, playing in the 2005 Fiesta Bowl). However, the presence of Boise State, a non-AQ school, quite possibly led to some of the lowest TV ratings ever for a BCS game. Of the 37 BCS bowl games played through the 2006 season, only two received lower ratings than this game—the 2005 Fiesta Bowl, the only other BCS game up to that time to feature a non-AQ school; and the 2007 Orange Bowl, which featured two non-traditional teams in Louisville and Wake Forest (which matched conference champions awarded the guaranteed spots in a BCS bowls due to their conference memberships in the Big East Conference and the Atlantic Coast Conference, respectively).

=== Legacy ===
The game's finish, along with its trick plays and underdog storyline, generated significant attention, and it is widely regarded as one of the most memorable college football bowl games.

ESPN columnist Pat Forde had this to say:

The Valley of the Stun was the stage as an indomitable bunch of dreamers in orange pants landed the mightiest populist blow of college football's modern era. They were Hickory High in helmets, George Mason in cleats. They knocked off a gridiron giant one decade to the day after the burial of Pokey Allen, the beloved Boise coach who brought the program up to Division I-A status just 11 years ago.

Stewart Mandel of Sports Illustrated:

How do you sum up one of the most remarkable endings any of us will ever be fortunate enough to see? How do you sum up one of the most exciting bowl games ever contested? And how do you sum up what will one day be viewed as one of the most significant moments in the history of college football? I’m not exaggerating....Boise State beating Oklahoma in a New Year's Day bowl game is college football's equivalent to George Mason reaching the Final Four, with one extremely significant difference: George Mason had its chance to compete for the national title; Boise State does not. Like it or not, Boise State 43, Oklahoma 42 just became the single biggest argument to date for a college football playoff....Not only did they get in the game, they made a major statement on behalf of their mid-major brethren that none of us will soon forget.

Arash Markazi, also of Sports Illustrated, who covered the Broncos throughout their stay in Arizona:

When it was over, even Hollywood couldn't have scripted a more dramatic ending. This was the ultimate underdog story of a team that believed from the start, refused to give up even when it looked bleak and pulled off the improbable. It's one thing for a Cinderella team to upset a heavily favored opponent, but c'mon, this was ridiculous....Boise State's mind-numbing 43–42 victory over Oklahoma in the Fiesta Bowl on Monday night had everything and will go down as one of [the] best games in college football history. It was as big as George Mason getting to the Final Four and is proof that mid-majors can play with the big boys in football, too.

Chris Dufresne of the Los Angeles Times:

Crazy, zany and loony are three apt words to describe the end of Monday night's Fiesta Bowl at the University of Phoenix Stadium. You thought it would never end, but it did, with one of the most gutsy calls and remarkable plays in the history of college football.

Pete Thamel of The New York Times:

...[A] hook-and-lateral, a Statue of Liberty play and a halfback toss launched the Boise State football team to an upset that will long resonate in college football lore....Johnson's proposal capped a dizzying, riveting, back-and-forth game that will be remembered as one of the most exciting in college football history.

It has been reported that the Boise State University Athletic Department is selling the rights for a major motion picture about the Broncos 2006 season.

Broncos quarterback Jared Zabransky is featured on the cover of the 2008 edition of EA Sports' popular NCAA Football video game. The last play of the game was also the subject of a television commercial for the video game, but with a twist: it featured Adrian Peterson controlling a Sooners player who tackled Johnson before he crossed the goal line.

The 2007 Fiesta Bowl won the 2007 Best Game ESPY Award, and the game's final play won the 2007 Best Play ESPY Award. It also took the No. 1 spot on ESPN's SportsCenter Top 10 Games of 2007. The final "Statue of Liberty" play also placed 2nd in ESPN's "The Greatest Highlight" hosted by Chris Berman. Fox Sports won its eighth Sports Emmy Award for Outstanding Live Sports Special for its coverage of the game. Sports Illustrated rated it "The game of the decade" for college football. CBS Sportsline.com rated the game as the most meaningful bowl played in the twenty seasons from 1992 to 2011, in terms of its impact on college football.
