= Derek Schouman =

American football player and coach (born 1985)

No. 80, 88
- Position: Tight end

Personal information
- Born: March 11, 1985 (age 41); Sandy, Utah, U.S.
- Listed height: 6 ft 3 in (1.91 m)
- Listed weight: 247 lb (112 kg)

Career information
- High school: Eagle (Eagle, Idaho)
- College: Boise State
- NFL draft: 2007: 7th round, 222nd overall pick

Career history
- Buffalo Bills (2007–2009); St. Louis Rams (2010); Washington Redskins (2011)*; New Orleans Saints (2012)*
- * Offseason or practice squad member only

Awards and highlights
- 2× First-team All-WAC (2005–2006)

Career NFL statistics
- Receptions: 27
- Receiving yards: 275
- Receiving touchdowns: 1
- Stats at Pro Football Reference

Derek Schouman (born March 11, 1985) is an American former professional football player who was a tight end in the National Football League (NFL). He was selected by the Buffalo Bills in the seventh round of the 2007 NFL draft. He played college football for the Boise State Broncos.

He also played for the St. Louis Rams.

== Early life ==
Born in Murray, Utah, Schouman was raised in Ada County, Idaho. He attended Eagle High School in Eagle, Idaho, where he lettered in football and was a two-year starter as a tight end. As a junior, he was an impact player for the State Championship team. As a senior, he was a first-team All-Southern Idaho Conference selection and as a junior, he was a second-team All-Southern Idaho Conference selection.

== College career ==
Schouman was a four-year starter at Boise State. Perhaps his greatest claim to fame was catching a fourth-down touchdown pass in overtime of the Broncos' win over Oklahoma in the 2007 Fiesta Bowl which set up the now-famous Jared Zabransky-to-Ian Johnson Statue of Liberty play for the winning two-point conversion.

=== Statistics ===
Year	Team	Conf	GP	Rec	Yrd	TD	Ave
2003	Boise State	WAC	14	17	272	4	16
2004	Boise State	WAC	7	15	284	2	18.9
2005	Boise State	WAC	12	17	177	1	10.4
2006	Boise State	WAC	12	29	276	4	9.5
NCAA Totals			45	78	1009	11	12.9

== Professional career ==
=== Buffalo Bills ===
Schouman recorded three receptions for 19 yards as an H-Back before suffering a season-ending sprained ankle against the Cincinnati Bengals in 2007. He started fourteen games in 2008 and 2009 before being placed on injured reserve early in 2009 with a knee injury. The Bills placed him on injured reserve again in 2010 and waived him on September 8, 2010.

=== St. Louis Rams ===
Schouman was signed by the St. Louis Rams on November 17, 2010. He played in four games for the Rams in 2010. He became an unrestricted free agent in July 2011.

=== Washington Redskins ===
On August 10, 2011, Schouman signed with the Washington Redskins. He was released by the team on September 3, 2011.

=== New Orleans Saints ===
The following year, the New Orleans Saints signed Schouman on July 25, 2012. He was released on August 31, 2012.

== Post-career ==
Since retiring from professional football, Schouman has worked as a real estate agent for Amherst Madison in Boise, Idaho.
