= Nic Harris =

American football player (born 1986)

No. 54, 59
- Position: Linebacker

Personal information
- Born: October 6, 1986 (age 40); Alexandria, Louisiana, U.S.
- Listed height: 6 ft 2 in (1.88 m)
- Listed weight: 232 lb (105 kg)

Career information
- High school: Alexandria
- College: Oklahoma
- NFL draft: 2009: 5th round, 147th overall pick

Career history
- Buffalo Bills (2009); Carolina Panthers (2010); Vila Velha Tritões (2014); Ancona A.F.T.(2015); Cruzeiro.(2017)

Awards and highlights
- Third-team All-American (2008); 2× First-team All-Big 12 (2007, 2008); Second-team All-Big 12 (2006)

Career NFL statistics
- Total tackles: 67
- Sacks: 1.5
- Fumble recoveries: 2
- Stats at Pro Football Reference

Nic Harris (born October 6, 1986) is an American former professional football player who was a linebacker in the National Football League (NFL). He played college football for the Oklahoma Sooners and was selected by the Buffalo Bills in the fifth round of the 2009 NFL draft.

== Early life ==
In his career with Alexandria Senior High School, Harris established a school record with 21 interceptions returning 9 for touchdowns. He tallied 81 tackles and intercepted 10 passes as a junior, recorded 74 tackles and intercepted 11 passes, returning four for touchdowns his senior season, and led the school to consecutive state playoffs appearances. He was named All-CENLA defensive MVP his senior year, and garnered national attention.

ESPN.com ranked him the No. 11 safety in the nation. Scout.com ranked him the No. 14 Safety and No. 62 player in the Southeast. Rivals.com declared him the No. 5 safety in the nation, while CollegeFootballNews.com ranked him the No. 7 safety in the nation. Harris was courted by several major Division I College football programs (Texas A&M, Michigan, Louisiana State, and Nebraska to name a few), before choosing the Oklahoma Sooners over the Michigan Wolverines.

== College career ==
As a true freshman in 2005, Harris started the Kansas State and Texas games at free safety. When he and true freshman Reggie Smith teamed up as defensive backs against the Wildcats, it marked only the second time in school history that two freshmen had started in the secondary. He logged seven tackles and one sack against KSU and seven tackles against the Longhorns with one forced fumble.

Harris was recognized on the All-Big 12-second-team by the coaches as a sophomore in 2006. He spent much of the season in the nickel role (only coming in for five-defensive back sets) before taking over as free safety for the last three games. He led OU with four interceptions, two of which came at Oregon and finished fourth on the team in total tackles with 68, and was credited with 2.5 sacks. Harris broke up two passes against Oklahoma State and Nebraska and had a career-high eight tackles at Oregon.

Against North Texas in the 2007 opener, Harris had 2 tackles for loss, broke up a pass, collected a sack for -10 yards, forced a fumble, and returned a Daniel Meager interception 25 yards for a touchdown. Against the Miami Hurricanes in week 2, Harris had 2.5 more tackles for loss and forced another fumble.

=== Statistics ===
Year	G-GS	UT	AT	Total	Loss	Sacks	INT	FC	FR	PBU
2005	10-2	8	8	16	1-0	1-0	-	1	-	
2006	14-8	40	28	68	8-42	3-11	4-11	-	-	8
Total	24-10	48	36	84	9-42	4-11	4-11	1	-	8

== Professional career ==
=== Buffalo Bills ===
Harris was selected by the Buffalo Bills in the fifth round (147th overall) of the 2009 NFL draft. He appeared in 15 games (two starts) as a rookie and recorded 30 tackles before being placed on injured reserve on January 1, 2010. Harris was waived by Buffalo after failing a physical on July 30, 2010.

=== Carolina Panthers ===
Harris signed with the Carolina Panthers on August 14, 2010. Harris was released prior to the 2011.

=== Vila Velha Tritões ===
Harris signed with the Vila Velha Tritões, of Brazil, in March 2014. He made his first game in Torneio Touchdown on May 11, playing in several roles, as quarterback, wide receiver, running back, safety and kick returner against Minas Locomotiva. He scored four touchdowns on offense and got two interceptions playing on defense. Tritões won by 34–14.

== Acting career ==
After retiring from football, Nic turned to acting appearing in many TV commercials. Most notably, he played the part of Baltimore Ravens linebacker Ray Lewis in the Kurt Warner biopic American Underdog.
