= 2006 All-Big 12 Conference football team =

The 2006 All-Big 12 Conference football team consists of American football players chosen as All-Big 12 Conference players for the 2006 Big 12 Conference football season. The conference recognizes two official All-Big 12 selectors: (1) the Big 12 conference coaches selected separate offensive and defensive units and named first- and second-team players (the "Coaches" team); and (2) a panel of sports writers and broadcasters covering the Big 12 also selected offensive and defensive units and named first- and second-team players (the "Media" team).

== Offensive selections ==
=== Quarterbacks ===
- Zac Taylor, Nebraska (Coaches-1; Media-1)
- Chase Daniel, Missouri (Coaches-2)
- Colt McCoy, Texas (Media-2)

=== Running backs ===
- Jon Cornish, Kansas (Coaches-1; Media-1)
- Adrian Peterson, Oklahoma (Coaches-1; Media-2)
- Brandon Jackson, Nebraska (Coaches-2; Media-2)
- Jorvorskie Lane, Texas A&M (Coaches-2)
- Jamaal Charles, Texas (Media-2)

=== Centers ===
- Lyle Sendlein, Texas (Coaches-2; Media-1)
- David Ochoa, Kansas (Coaches-2; Media-2)
- Scott Stephenson, Iowa State (Coaches-2)
- Cody Wallace, Texas A&M (Coaches-2)
- Matt Slauson, Nebraska (Media-2)

=== Guards ===
- Kasey Studdard, Texas (Coaches-1; Media-1)
- Brian Daniels, Colorado (Media-2)
- Kirk Elder, Texas A&M (Media-2)
- Manuel Ramirez, Texas Tech (Media-2)

=== Tackles ===
- Justin Blalock, Texas (Coaches-1; Media-1)
- Corey Hilliard, Oklahoma State (Coaches-1; Media-1)
- Chris Messner, Oklahoma (Coaches-1; Media-1)
- Joel Clinger, Missouri (Coaches-1)
- Glenn January, Texas Tech (Coaches-2)

=== Tight ends ===
- Martin Rucker, Missouri (Coaches-1)
- Chase Coffman, Missouri (Media-1)
- Martellus Bennett, Texas A&M (Coaches-2; Media-2)

=== Receivers ===
- Adarius Bowman, Oklahoma State (Coaches-1; Media-1)
- Joel Filani, Texas Tech (Coaches-1; Media-1)
- Limas Sweed, Texas (Coaches-1; Media-2)
- Malcolm Kelly, Oklahoma (Coaches-2; Media-2)
- Chris Alexander, Texas A&M (Coaches-2)
- Maurice Purify, Nebraska (Coaches-2)
- Dominique Zeigler, Baylor (Coaches-2)

== Defensive selections ==
=== Defensive linemen ===
- Ian Campbell, Kansas State (Coaches-1; Media-1)
- Adam Carriker, Nebraska (Coaches-1; Media-1)
- Abraham Wright, Colorado (Coaches-1; Media-1)
- Larry Birdine, Oklahoma (Coaches-1)
- C. J. Ah You, Oklahoma (Coaches-1)
- Tim Crowder, Texas (Coaches-2; Media-1)
- Keyunta Dawson, Texas Tech (Coaches-2; Media-2)
- Victor DeGrate, Oklahoma State (Coaches-2; Media-2)
- Jay Moore, Nebraska (Coaches-2)
- Brian Smith, Missouri (Coaches-2)
- Chris Harrington, Texas A&M (Media-2)
- James McClinton, Kansas (Media-2)

=== Linebackers ===
- Rufus Alexander, Oklahoma (Coaches-1; Media-1)
- Marcus Bacon, Missouri (Coaches-1; Media-1)
- Bo Ruud, Nebraska (Coaches-1)
- Brandon Archer, Kansas State (Coaches-2; Media-1)
- Alvin Bowen, Iowa State (Coaches-2; Media-1)
- Joe Pawelek, Baylor (Coaches-2)
- Jordon Dizon, Colorado (Media-2)
- Zach Latimer, Oklahoma (Media-2)
- Ty McKenzie, Iowa State (Media-2)
- Justin Warren, Texas A&M (Media-2)

=== Defensive backs ===
- Michael Griffin, Texas (Coaches-1; Media-1)
- Aaron Ross, Texas (Coaches-1; Media-1)
- Aqib Talib, Kansas (Coaches-1; Media-1)
- Melvin Bullitt, Texas A&M (Coaches-1; Media-2)
- Terrence Wheatley, Colorado (Coaches-1; Media-2)
- Reggie Smith, Oklahoma (Coaches-2; Media-1)
- David Overstreet, Missouri (Coaches-2; Media-2)
- Nic Harris, Oklahoma (Coaches-2)
- Marcus Watt, Kansas State (Coaches-2)
- Marcus Walker, Oklahoma (Coaches-2)
- C. J. Wilson, Baylor (Media-2)

== Special teams ==
=== Kickers ===
- Mason Crosby, Colorado (Coaches-1; Media-1)
- Garrett Hartley, Oklahoma (Coaches-2; Media-2)

=== Punters ===
- Daniel Sepulveda, Baylor (Coaches-1; Media-1)
- Matt Fodge, Oklahoma State (Coaches-2; Media-2)

=== All-purpose / Return specialists ===
- Yamon Figurs, Kansas State (Coaches-1)
- Shannon Woods, Texas Tech (Media-1)
- Aaron Ross, Texas (Coaches-2)
- Perrish Cox, Oklahoma State (Media-2)
- Marlon Lucky, Nebraska (Media-2)

== Key ==
Bold = selected as a first-team player by both the coaches and media panel

Coaches = selected by Big 12 Conference coaches

Media = selected by a media panel

== See also ==
- 2006 College Football All-America Team
