= Bobby Reid (American football) =

American football player and coach (born 1985)

No. 7
- Position: Quarterback

Personal information
- Born: December 13, 1985 (age 40); Houston, Texas, U.S.
- Listed height: 6 ft 3 in (1.91 m)
- Listed weight: 235 lb (107 kg)

Career information
- High school: Cloverleaf (TX) North Shore Senior
- College: Oklahoma State (2004–2007); Texas Southern (2008)
- NFL draft: 2009: undrafted

Career history

Playing
- Tulsa Talons (2011)

Coaching
- Oklahoma State (2013–2014) Quality control assistant; SMU (2015) Graduate assistant

Career AFL statistics
- Completions: 57
- Attempts: 112
- Passing yards: 559
- Touchdowns: 6
- Interceptions: 8
- Stats at ArenaFan.com

Bobby Reid (born December 13, 1985) is an American former football quarterback. He played college football for the Oklahoma State Cowboys and Texas Southern Tigers. Reid played high school football at Galena Park North Shore High School in Houston, where he led his team to the Class 5A Division I Championship his senior year. He was named Houston Touchdown Club's Offensive Player of the Year, and was named the all-Greater Houston, all-district and the district's Most Valuable Player.

== High school ==
Reid was one of the top quarterback prospects in the country when he started his senior year at North Shore Senior High School. He was a dual threat quarterback who led his team to an unbeaten championship season and the Class 5A Division I Championship. He ran for three touchdowns in the 23-7 championship win over The Woodlands, and threw a pass to set up a touchdown run.

In his senior year he accounted for 38 touchdowns, 22 passing and 16 rushing, and a combined 2,650 yards.

Reid was named the Houston Touchdown Club's Offensive Player of the Year, and the All-Greater Houston, All-District and the district's Most Valuable Player. He was named to the national and Texas Top 100 recruiting lists, and attended the Elite 11 Quarterback Camp in California.

== College career ==
Reid sat out his red-shirt year in 2004 after breaking his shoulder in practice, but started five games as a red-shirt freshman the following autumn until a mid-season injury.

He finished 2005 with 602 yards on 52 of 108 passing with two touchdowns and four interceptions. He also had 61 carries for 139 yards rushing and five receptions for 24 yards.

Reid played in all of Oklahoma State's 2006 games in which the Cowboys went 7 and 6, including an Independence Bowl victory over Alabama.

The high point of Reid's sophomore season came in the Cowboys shoot out victory over Kansas. Reid scored all of the Cowboys' touchdowns throwing for 411 yards and five touchdowns, while also running in a touchdown as Oklahoma State ran out 42–32 victors. The low point of his season came as he was benched in the second half of the Cowboys' loss to in-state rival Oklahoma.

Reid ended the season with 2,226 yards, 24 touchdowns and 11 interceptions.

Reid was one of the 35 quarterbacks placed on the 2007 Manning Award watch list. However, that same year he was demoted to back-up quarterback. This led to a media controversy surrounding comments made by OSU coach Mike Gundy.

Following the 2007 college football season, Reid flirted with the idea of declaring for the NFL draft but instead chose to transfer to Texas Southern, a D1 FCS school that finished 0–11 in 2007.

In 2008, Reid's stats for Texas Southern were admirable considering he did not finish the season because of a knee injury. He threw for 148-261 for 1791 yards and 12 TDs with 6 INTS and only 8 sacks. He finished his college career with 4,934 yards and 39 TDs.

Year	Team	Games		Record	Passing							Rushing			
Year	Team	G	GS	Record	Comp	Att	Pct	Yards	TD	Int	Rate	Att	Yards	Avg	TD
2005	Oklahoma State	7	5	3–2	52	108	48.1	602	2	4	93.7	61	139	2.3	0
2006	Oklahoma State	13	?	0-0	148	267	55.4	2,266	24	11	148.1	119	500	4.2	5
2007	Oklahoma State	8	?	0–0	26	49	53.1	275	1	1	102.9	19	15	0.8	0
2008	Texas Southern	10	?	0–0	148	261	56.7	1,791	12	6	124.9	114	227	2.0	9
Career		38	?	0–0	374	685	54.6	4,934	39	22	127.5	313	881	2.8	14

== Professional career ==
In the spring of 2009 It was reported that Bobby Reid had a pro day work out at University of Texas–Arlington. Five NFL team representatives were there to watch the workout. Due to an ACL injury, he could only throw passes. Reid impressed the scouts with his arm. "Reid threw the ball real well", Titans head scout Brocato said. "He's got a very good arm, and he's big 6-foot 3."

On March 15, 2010, Reid worked as the throwing quarterback at the LSU pro football timing day. He also ran the athletic drills, posting times of 4.67 and 4.64 seconds in the 40-yard dash, posting a 33½-inch vertical jump, a 9-3 broad jump, a 4.41 second short shuttle drill and 19 reps at 225 lbs. on the bench press.

In 2010, Reid signed with the Tulsa Talons of the Arena Football League, wearing number 7. In 2011, Reid played several games for the Talons, and led the team in rushing with 312 yds and 13 TDs on 32 carries.

Reid's 2011 Tulsa Talons Statistics:

COMP	ATT	%	Yards	TD	INT
57	112	50.9	559	6	8

On February 18, 2013, Oklahoma State hired Bobby Reid in an administrative, non-coaching position.

On January 8, 2015, Reid left OSU for SMU. Reid was hired by SMU as a graduate assistant/defense to work with players underneath former Cowboys cornerbacks coach Van Malone, the Mustangs' defensive coordinator.
