= Zach Latimer =

American football player (born 1983)

Profile
- Position: Linebacker

Personal information
- Born: October 21, 1983 (age 43); Denver, Colorado, U.S.

Career information
- College: Oklahoma
- NFL draft: 2007: undrafted

Career history
- 2007: Washington Redskins*
- 2007: San Diego Chargers*
- * Offseason or practice squad member only

Awards and highlights
- Second-team All-Big 12 (2006)

Zach Latimer (born October 21, 1983) is an American former football linebacker. He played college football at the University of Oklahoma. His father, Don Latimer, played collegiate football for the University of Miami, and in the National Football League (NFL) for the Denver Broncos.
