= Rufus Alexander =

American football player (born 1983)

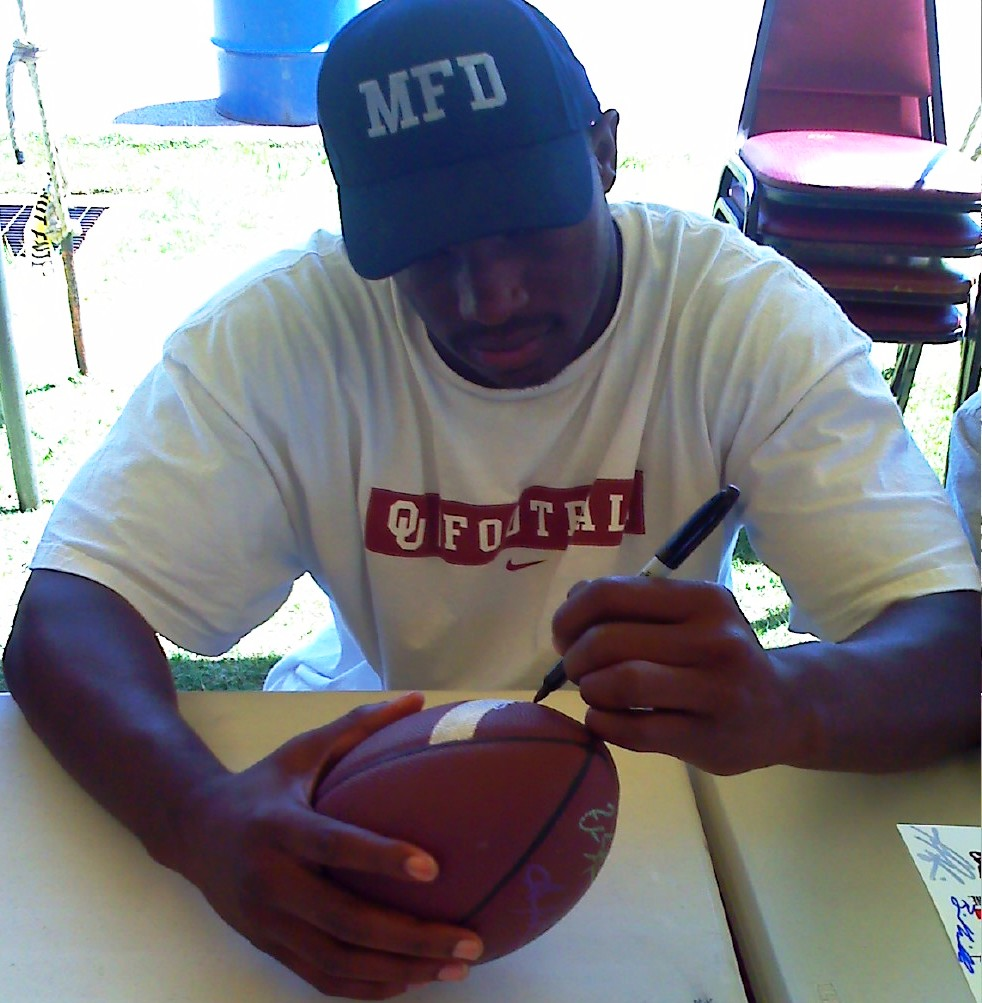
- Alexander at the 2008 Josh Heupel Day of Champions Football Camp signing a football

No. 57
- Position: Linebacker

Personal information
- Born: April 12, 1983 (age 43); Breaux Bridge, Louisiana, U.S.
- Listed height: 6 ft 1 in (1.85 m)
- Listed weight: 232 lb (105 kg)

Career information
- High school: Christian Life Academy (Baton Rouge, Louisiana)
- College: Oklahoma
- NFL draft: 2007: 6th round, 176th overall pick

Career history
- Minnesota Vikings (2007–2008); Indianapolis Colts (2008); Detroit Lions (2009)*
- * Offseason or practice squad member only

Awards and highlights
- First-team All-American (2006); Big 12 Defensive Player of the Year (2006); 2× First-team All-Big 12 (2005, 2006); Second-team All-Big 12 (2004)
- Stats at Pro Football Reference

Rufus Alexander (born April 12, 1983) is an American former professional football player who was a linebacker in the National Football League (NFL). He was selected by the Minnesota Vikings in the sixth round of the 2007 NFL draft. He was also a member of the Indianapolis Colts and Detroit Lions. He played college football for the Oklahoma Sooners.

== Early life ==
Alexander was raised by a mother who worked all of the time to support her family while his father was in prison. His oldest brother was in and out of legal trouble and the middle brother was following suit. Alexander met the Barham family, David and Melinda, while he was in junior high. In need of a stable living environment, the Barhams spoke to Alexander's mother, Seine, about having Alexander move in with them. The Barhams never legally adopted Alexander. David Barham accepted a job as the football coach at Christian Life Academy in Baton Rouge, Louisiana, and he brought Alexander with him. Alexander became a dominant player, leading his team to district titles his junior and senior year. Barham began to actively pursue colleges on his behalf as Alexander was listed as a top 20 high school linebacker. Barham initiated contact with Oklahoma's defensive coordinator Brent Venables in December 2001. The Sooners offered Alexander a scholarship and he chose Oklahoma over several other offers.

== College career ==
He played for the Oklahoma Sooners football team from 2003 to 2006. In 2006, Alexander was named to the All-Big 12 Conference First-team, the Big 12 Defensive Player of the Year, and an AP and AFCA All-American.

== Professional career ==
=== Minnesota Vikings ===
Alexander was selected by the Minnesota Vikings in the sixth round (176th overall) of the 2007 NFL draft. Alexander was injured in the Vikings first preseason game of 2007 and suffered a torn ACL, resulting in season-ending surgery.

After the 2008 preseason, Alexander was released. He was re-signed to the practice squad on September 23. The Vikings promoted him to their active roster on October 19 when they waived linebacker Erin Henderson. The Vikings waived Alexander two days later and re-signed Henderson. Alexander was signed back to the practice squad on October 23.

=== Indianapolis Colts ===
Alexander was signed off the Vikings' practice squad by the Indianapolis Colts on December 2, 2008. On December 26, 2008, he was cut from the Colts' active roster and then signed back onto the Colts' practice squad on December 30, 2008.

Following the season, he was re-signed to a future contract on January 5, 2009. He was waived by the team on May 4.

=== Detroit Lions ===
Alexander signed with the Detroit Lions on August 28, 2009. He was cut by the Lions on September 5, 2009.

== Personal life ==
Son Darrien Alexander was born May 17, 2007, He is a cousin of NFL safety Gerald Alexander.
