= Larry Birdine =

American gridiron football player (born 1983)

No. 92, 77
- Position: Defensive end

Personal information
- Born: October 6, 1983 (age 43); Lawton, Oklahoma, U.S.
- Listed height: 6 ft 4 in (1.93 m)
- Listed weight: 265 lb (120 kg)

Career information
- College: Oklahoma
- NFL draft: 2007: undrafted

Career history
- Green Bay Packers (2007)*; Tennessee Titans (2007)*; Denver Broncos (2007); San Francisco 49ers (2008)*; Tennessee Titans (2009)*; Edmonton Eskimos (2010)
- * Offseason or practice squad member only

Awards and highlights
- First-team All-Big 12 (2006)

Larry Birdine (born October 6, 1983) is an American former professional football defensive end. He was signed by the Green Bay Packers as an undrafted free agent in 2007. He played college football for the Oklahoma Sooners.

Birdine was also a member of the Tennessee Titans, Denver Broncos, San Francisco 49ers and Edmonton Eskimos.

== Early life ==
Birdine was a two-sport letterman at Eisenhower High School in Lawton, Oklahoma. Birdine competed in football and track during his prep career and received consensus All-state honors as a senior and totaled 147 tackles, eight sacks and 24 tackles for losses in his final two seasons. He compiled 81 tackles, 14 stops for losses, four sacks, three fumble recoveries and one blocked punt as a senior. He competed in shot put and discus on the school's track team.

== College career ==
Birdine played 41 career games (14 starts) at the University of Oklahoma, where he totaled 103 tackles (61 solo), 14.5 sacks, four forced fumbles, one fumble recovery, one interception and seven pass breakups. He was a part of Oklahoma’s 2003 and 2004 teams that played in the BCS National Championship Game (Sugar Bowl) in 2003 vs. LSU and (Orange Bowl in 2004 vs. USC). He achieved notoriety prior to the 2005 Orange Bowl by opining that USC's offense (which was to score 55 points in the game) was merely "average". He played 14 games (13 starts) as a senior, posting 39 tackles, 3.5 sacks, one forced fumble and two pass breakups. Me missed the 2005 regular season due to a torn left biceps muscle but returned to play in the Holiday Bowl against Oregon. He played all 13 games (0 starts) as a sophomore and registered career highs in tackles (40), tackles for losses (11), sacks (7), pass breakups (4) and forced fumbles (2) to go along with a fumble recovery. As a redshirt freshman, he played all 14 games (1 start), totaling 24 tackles (15 solo), four sacks, one forced fumble and his only career interception.

== Professional career ==
Birdine measured 6-3½, 261 pounds, and ran a 4.76 40-yard dash, did 21 reps of 225 pounds on the bench press. At his Pro day he did the 20-yard Shuttle in 4.52 seconds and the Three-Cone drill in 7.47 seconds.

=== Green Bay Packers ===
After going undrafted in the 2007 NFL draft, Birdine signed with the Green Bay Packers on May 4, 2007. He was waived on September 1, 2007.

=== Tennessee Titans ===
Birdine was signed to the Tennessee Titans' practice squad on September 4, 2007, then signed by Denver November 6, 2007. Was later re-signed by the Titans for the 2009 season.

=== Post-football career ===
Birdine currently works for Homes by Taber Oklahoma City, OK as a construction project manager.

== Personal life ==
Birdine is the half-brother of former NFL linebacker Jason Gildon.
