= C. J. Ah You =

American football player and coach (born 1982)

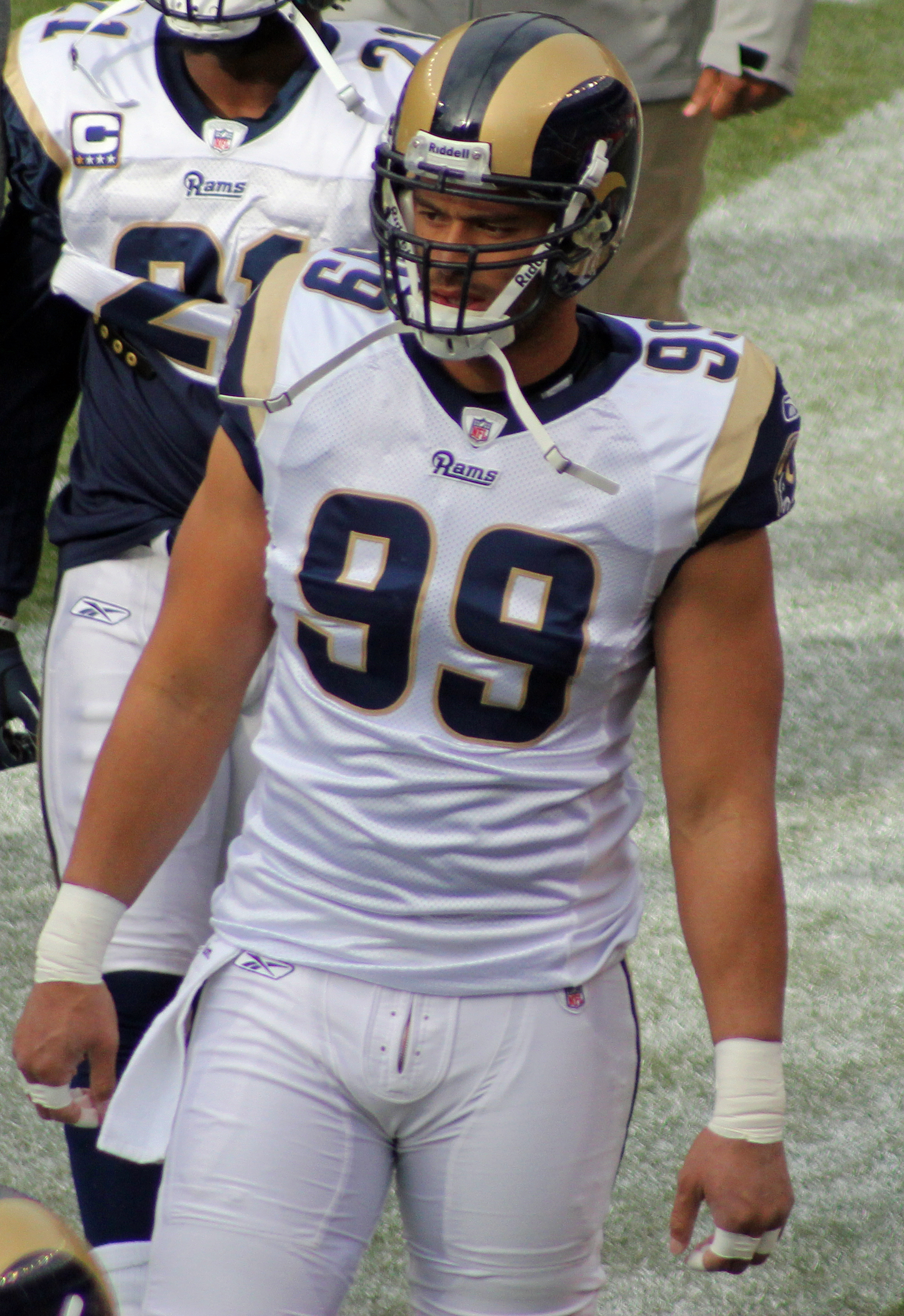
- Ah You with the St. Louis Rams in 2010

Pittsburgh Steelers
- Title: Outside linebackers coach

Personal information
- Born: July 7, 1982 (age 44); La Habra, California, U.S.
- Listed height: 6 ft 4 in (1.93 m)
- Listed weight: 265 lb (120 kg)

Career information
- High school: Lone Peak (Highland, Utah)
- College: BYU (2001–2003); Oklahoma (2005–2006)
- NFL draft: 2007: 7th round, 239th overall pick

Career history

Playing
- Buffalo Bills (2007)*; St. Louis Rams (2007–2011)
- * Offseason or practice squad member only

Coaching
- Oklahoma (2015) Special teams quality control coach; Vanderbilt (2016–2018) Defensive line coach; New York Guardians (2020) Defensive line coach; USC (2021) Quality control analyst; Texas Tech (2022–2025); Outside linebackers coach (2022–2025); Interim defensive coordinator (2024); Pittsburgh Steelers (2026–present) Outside linebackers coach

Awards and highlights
- Big 12 Newcomer of the Year (2005); First-team All-Big 12 (2006)

Career NFL statistics
- Total tackles: 41
- Sacks: 6
- Forced fumbles: 1
- Stats at Pro Football Reference

Charles "C. J." Ah You, Jr. (born July 7, 1982) is an American football coach and former defensive end who is currently the outside linebackers coach for the Pittsburgh Steelers of the National Football League (NFL). He was selected by the Buffalo Bills in the seventh round of the 2007 NFL draft and spent most of his career with the St. Louis Rams. He played college football at BYU and Oklahoma.

== Early life ==
Ah You played high school football at Lone Peak High School in Highland, Utah. He was named defensive line MVP during senior season there.

== College career ==
Ah You started at Brigham Young University in 2001 when he had 9 tackles, 2 for losses and 2 sacks in three games. Ah You Redshirted '02 at BYU with a right knee injury. Due to violations of BYU's honor code, Ah You was expelled from BYU in January 2004. He transferred to Snow College in 2004. He then transferred to the University of Oklahoma in 2005 and earned Big 12 Defensive Newcomer of the Year. He was also honorable mention All-Big 12 in 2005. In 2005, he had 45 tackles, with 12 going for losses and seven sacks. He also forced three fumbles and broke up two passes. In 2006, he played 14 games with nine starts with 43 tackles (25 solo) and 10 for losses, with four being sacks. He also forced a fumble and broke up three passes. Ah You played in 26 games with 21 starts at Oklahoma totaling 11 career sacks in two seasons with 88 tackles, 22 for losses to go with the 11 sacks and four forced fumbles. For his 2006 efforts he was named First-team All-Big 12.

== Professional career ==
Pre-draft measurables
Height	Weight	Arm length	Hand span	40-yard dash	10-yard split	20-yard split	20-yard shuttle	Three-cone drill	Vertical jump	Broad jump	Bench press
6 ft 3 3/4 in (1.92 m)	274 lb (124 kg)	34 1/8 in (0.87 m)	9 7/8 in (0.25 m)	4.72 s	1.63 s	2.75 s	4.26 s	7.06 s	36.5 in (0.93 m)	9 ft 7 in (2.92 m)	26 reps
All values from NFL Combine/Pro Day

=== Buffalo Bills ===
Ah You entered the NFL as a seventh-round draft choice (239th overall) of the Buffalo Bills in the 2007 NFL draft. He spent the preseason with Bills before being released on September 2, 2007.

=== St. Louis Rams ===
He added to the Rams' practice squad on November 21, 2007. He played his first NFL game in the 2009 season opener against the Seattle Seahawks. He played mostly in the Rams nickel defense, rushing as a defensive tackle. He injured his knee in Week 10 and was placed on injured reserve. He underwent knee surgery on his left knee. He ended the season with 17 tackles and one sack.

The Rams released Ah You to free agency on March 13, 2012.

== Coaching career ==
Ah You was hired as the special teams quality control coach at Oklahoma by Bob Stoops in 2015. On January 14, 2016, it was announced that Vanderbilt had hired Ah You as defensive line coach under head coach and defensive coordinator Derek Mason.

In 2019, Ah You joined the New York Guardians of the XFL as defensive line coach.

Ah You was hired as a quality control analyst at USC in 2021. Ah You was hired as the defensive line coach at Nevada in January 2022, but less than a month later, he accepted the outside linebackers job at Texas Tech. In December 2024, Ah You was named the interim defensive coordinator for the Red Raiders' bowl game following the dismissal of incumbent defensive coordinator Tim DeRuyter following the conclusion of the regular season.

On February 12, 2026, the Pittsburgh Steelers hired Ah You to serve as the team's outside linebackers coach under new head coach Mike McCarthy.

== Personal Life ==
He is related to several football players—his father, Charles Sr., who played for BYU; his brother, Matt, who was a linebacker at BYU, and his uncle, Junior Ah You, who was a defensive end for Arizona State, the United States Football League and the Canadian Football League and is a member of the Canadian Football Hall of Fame. His nephew, Kingsley Suamataia, is currently a member of the Kansas City Chiefs. Ah You is of Samoan, German, and Chinese descent.
