= Alvin Bowen =

American football player (born 1983)

No. 54
- Position: Linebacker

Personal information
- Born: December 24, 1983 (age 42); East Orange, New Jersey, U.S.
- Listed height: 6 ft 1 in (1.85 m)
- Listed weight: 220 lb (100 kg)

Career information
- High school: Montclair (Montclair, New Jersey)
- College: Iowa State
- NFL draft: 2008: 5th round, 147th overall pick

Career history
- Buffalo Bills (2008–2009); Washington Redskins (2009); Seattle Seahawks (2010)*; Jacksonville Jaguars (2010); Denver Broncos (2011)*; Saskatchewan Roughriders (2012)*; Calgary Stampeders (2012–2014); Saskatchewan Roughriders (2014)*
- * Offseason or practice squad member only

Awards and highlights
- First-team All-Big 12 (2006); Second-team All-Big 12 (2007); First-team All-KJCCC (2004); NCAA solo tackles leader (2005)

Career NFL statistics
- Total tackles: 1
- Stats at Pro Football Reference
- Stats at CFL.ca (archive)

Alvin Bowen (born December 24, 1983) is an American former professional football player who was a linebacker in the National Football League (NFL) and Canadian Football League (CFL). He was selected by the Buffalo Bills in the fifth round of the 2008 NFL draft. He played college football for the Iowa State Cyclones. Bowen was also a member of the Washington Redskins, Seattle Seahawks, Jacksonville Jaguars, Denver Broncos of the NFL, and the Saskatchewan Roughriders and Calgary Stampeders of the CFL.

Born in East Orange, New Jersey, Bowen was raised in nearby Montclair, where he played football at Montclair High School.

== College career ==
Bowen attended and played college football for the Iowa State Cyclones. During his junior year, he recorded 155 tackles (finishing first in the nation), one interception, and one fumble recovery. During his senior season, Bowen recorded 99 tackles, one interception, and one fumble recovery.

== Professional career ==
=== Buffalo Bills ===
Bowen was selected by the Buffalo Bills in the fifth round (147th overall) of the 2008 NFL draft. During training camp on August 1, Bowen suffered a serious knee injury. He was waived/injured on August 7 and subsequently placed on season-ending injured reserve.

He was released by the Bills on September 5, 2009. He was re-signed to the practice squad on September 6, and was released on September 22.

He was on the team again for weeks 13–17 due to the Bills suffering a string of injuries to their linebackers. Linebackers Paul Posluzny, Marcus Buggs, Kawika Mitchell and Keith Ellison all missed time due to injury.

=== Washington Redskins ===
Bowen was signed to the Washington Redskins practice squad on September 24. He was later promoted to the active roster on November 30, 2009. After one season, he was released from the Redskins on June 9, 2010.

=== Seattle Seahawks ===
Bowen signed with the Seattle Seahawks on August 7, 2010. He was waived on August 17.

=== Jacksonville Jaguars ===
Bowen signed with the Jacksonville Jaguars on August 20, 2010. He was released on September 4. He was signed to the practice squad the next day. He was signed from the practice squad on September 19 and waived on September 28. He was re-signed to the practice squad on September 30.

On August 13, 2011, Bowen was waived by the Jaguars.

=== Denver Broncos ===
On August 15, 2011, he was claimed off waivers by the Denver Broncos.

=== Saskatchewan Roughriders (first stint) ===
On March 8, 2012, Alvin Bowen signed with the Saskatchewan Roughriders of the Canadian Football League. On April 19, Bowen was released by the 'Riders.

=== Calgary Stampeders ===
Bowen signed with the Calgary Stampeders on October 10, 2012. He was released by the Stampeders on October 13, 2014.

=== Saskatchewan Roughriders (second stint) ===
Bowen was signed to the Roughriders' practice roster on October 23, 2014. He was released by the Roughriders on November 13, 2014.

== See also ==
- List of NCAA major college football yearly tackles leaders
