= Rhett Bomar =

American football player (born 1985)

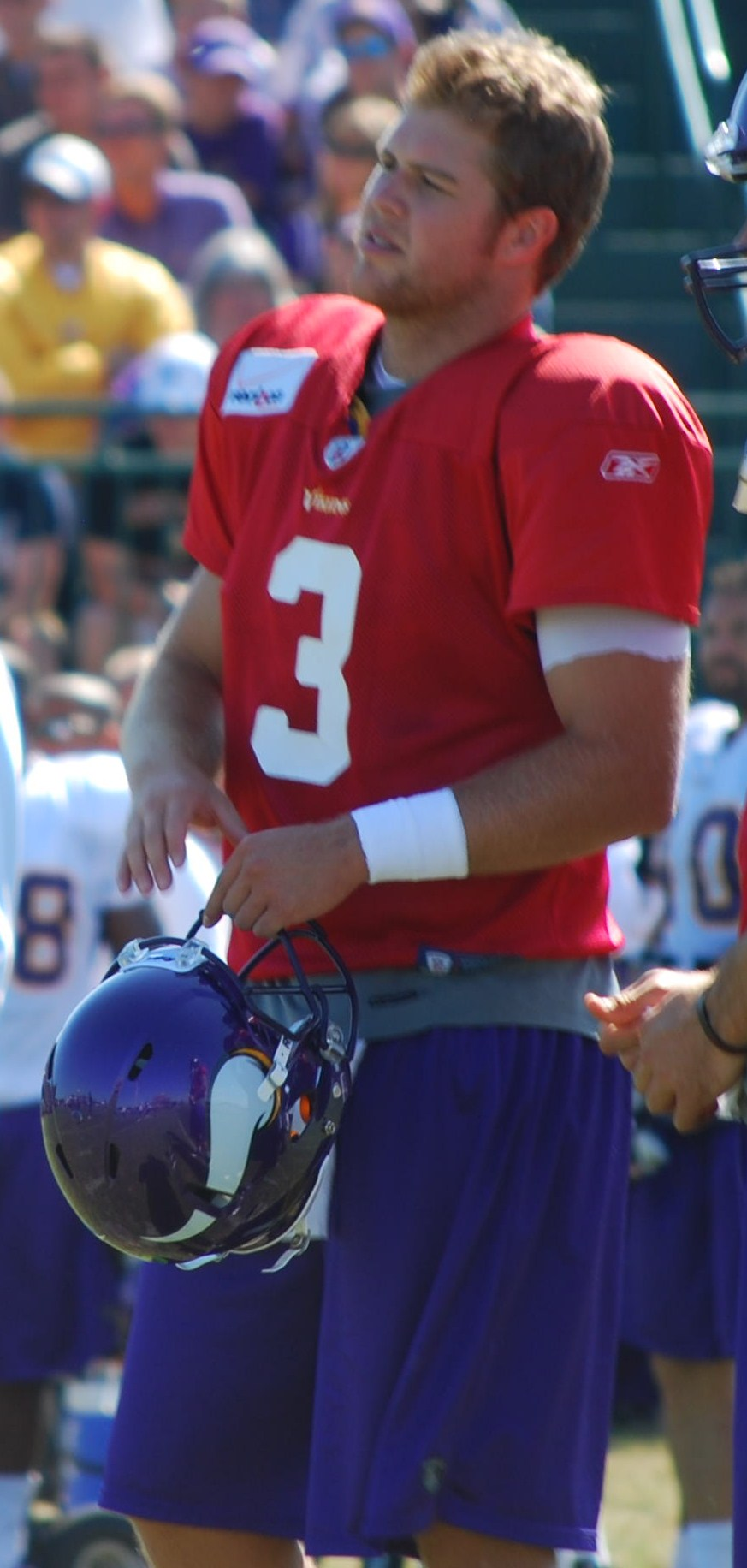
- Bomar at Minnesota Vikings training camp in 2011

No. 3
- Position: Quarterback

Personal information
- Born: June 2, 1985 (age 41); Groesbeck, Texas, U.S.
- Listed height: 6 ft 2 in (1.88 m)
- Listed weight: 225 lb (102 kg)

Career information
- High school: Grand Prairie (TX)
- College: Oklahoma (2004–2006); Sam Houston State (2007–2008)
- NFL draft: 2009: 5th round, 151st overall pick

Career history

Playing
- New York Giants (2009–2010); Minnesota Vikings (2010); Oakland Raiders (2012)*
- * Offseason or practice squad member only

Coaching
- Orange Grove HS (TX) (2012–2013) Assistant coach; Alief Taylor HS (TX) (2014) Assistant coach; Freer HS (TX) (2015–2016) Head coach; Conroe HS (TX) (2017) Offensive coordinator & quarterbacks coach

Operations
- Freer HS (TX) (2015–2016) Athletic director

Awards and highlights
- Second-team All-SLC (2008); Holiday Bowl Offensive MVP (2005)
- Stats at Pro Football Reference

Rhett Matthew Bomar (born June 2, 1985) is an American former professional football quarterback. He was selected by the New York Giants in the fifth round of the 2009 NFL draft. He played college football at the University of Oklahoma and Sam Houston State University. He was also a member of the Minnesota Vikings and Oakland Raiders.

== Early life ==
Bomar initially learned football from his father, Jerry Bomar, a long-time high school head coach in Texas. The elder Bomar had himself been an all-state high school quarterback in Texas. After playing on the defensive side of the ball for Texas Tech, Jerry Bomar moved into coaching, and Rhett was born at about the time his father became a high school head coach.

Rhett was a ball boy for his father's team, Groesbeck High School, when that team won the 3-A Texas state championship in 1991. At Grand Prairie High School, where his father was head football coach and athletic director, Bomar was an outfielder considered good enough for the Major League Baseball annual draft. In addition to graduating in the top 1% of his class, Rhett was a three-year starter at quarterback.

In high school, Bomar was evaluated to be the nation's top high school quarterback by such rating services as Rivals.com and Scout.com. Bomar signed to play for the Oklahoma Sooners.

== College career ==
=== Oklahoma ===
Bomar became the starter by the second game of the 2005 season. His season started roughly while he adjusted to college football, but his game improved throughout the season. He was named the Most Valuable Player of the Holiday Bowl when Oklahoma defeated the Oregon Ducks.

On August 2, 2006, Bomar was dismissed from the team by OU head coach Bob Stoops. It was reported that he was paid for work at Big Red Sports and Imports, a car dealership owned by a major University of Oklahoma donor, but that he did not complete the work, a violation of NCAA rules. Senior Paul Thompson began the year as starting quarterback, backed up by true freshman Sam Bradford and junior college transfer Joey Halzle.

=== Sam Houston State ===
Bomar entered spring practice as the starting quarterback for the 2007 Bearkats, with two years of collegiate eligibility remaining. He played nine games the first year for the Bearkats before injuring his knee on November 3, 2007, against Nicholls State.

SHSU head coach Todd Whitten told the Huntsville Item, “Rhett adds a level of athleticism at quarterback that we haven't had before. He'll get plenty of reps this spring, and we think our offense can create a lot of explosive plays next year.”

Bomar started all 10 games in 2008 for Sam Houston State as the Bearkats went 4–6 on the season. He completed his college career as Sam Houston's all-time leader in passing with 5,564 yards in 19 games and career leader in total offense with 6,159 yards. He was a two-time All-Southland Conference selection and ended the 2008 season ranked No. 2 in NCAA Division I Football Championship Subdivision total offense (354.2 yards per game) and No. 4 in passing offense (335.5 yards per contest).

Bomar passed for more than 300 yards in nine games during his Bearkat career. He threw for passes of more than 50 yards 10 times, including his longest of 80 yards. He is one of only 11 players in NCAA FCS history to throw for more than 300 yards and rush for more than 100 yards in a single game (against North Dakota State in 2007).

He was selected as a finalist for the Walter Payton Award given to the top player in the Football Championship Subdivision. He also played in the 2009 Senior Bowl.

== Professional career ==
Pre-draft measurables
Height	Weight	Arm length	Hand span	40-yard dash	10-yard split	20-yard split	20-yard shuttle	Three-cone drill	Broad jump	Bench press
6 ft 2 1/4 in (1.89 m)	225 lb (102 kg)	32 in (0.81 m)	9 in (0.23 m)	4.82 s	1.74 s	2.83 s	4.06 s	6.91 s	8 ft 10 in (2.69 m)	25 reps
All values from NFL Combine

=== New York Giants ===
In the 2009 NFL draft, Bomar was selected by the New York Giants as the 15th pick of the fifth round (151st overall). Bomar on June 24, 2009, signed a four-year contract, including a $185,183 signing bonus. He was waived by the Giants on September 5, and re-signed to the team's practice squad on September 6. Bomar was promoted to the active roster on December 31.

On September 4, 2010, Bomar was waived by the Giants. Following an injury to Giants quarterback Jim Sorgi, Bomar was initially expected to take over the role as backup quarterback, but on September 3, the Giants acquired Sage Rosenfels from the Minnesota Vikings to step in at the position, making Bomar expendable. On the following day, September 5, the Giants re-signed Bomar to the team's practice squad.

=== Minnesota Vikings ===
Bomar was signed by the Minnesota Vikings off of the Giants' practice squad on December 21, 2010, and made him the team's third-string quarterback for the final two games of the season.

=== Oakland Raiders ===
On January 6, 2012, Bomar was signed by the Oakland Raiders to reserve/future contract. He was waived May 14, following the Raiders' acquisition of Matt Leinart.

== Coaching career ==
After his NFL experience, Bomar went into coaching. In 2012 and 2013, Bomar worked as an assistant on his father's coaching staff at Orange Grove High School.

Bomar moved to Houston's Alief High School to become an assistant coach for the 2014 season. In 2015, he moved to Freer, Texas, to become head football coach and athletic director at Freer High School. In 2017, he became offensive coordinator at Conroe High School.

== Head coaching record ==
Year	Team	Overall	Conference	Standing	Bowl/playoffs
Freer Buckaroos () (2015–2016)
2015	Freer	4–8	3–2	2nd	
2016	Freer	6–5	3–1	2nd	
Freer:		10–13	6–3		
Total:		10–13			
