= Paul Thompson (American football) =

American football player (born 1983)

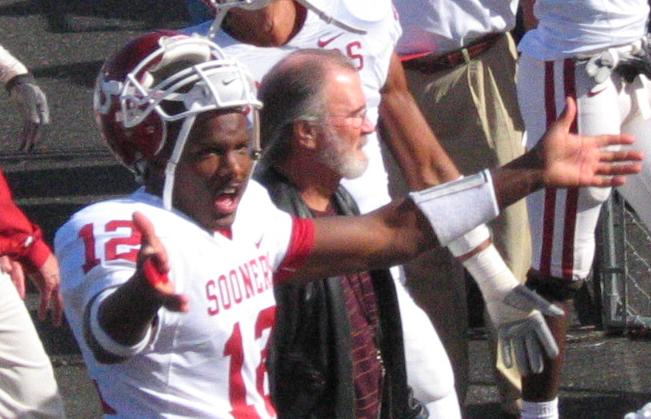
- Paul Thompson celebrates the 2006 win over Missouri

No. 12
- Position: Quarterback

Personal information
- Born: November 23, 1983 (age 42); Leander, Texas, U.S.
- Listed height: 6 ft 4 in (1.93 m)
- Listed weight: 216 lb (98 kg)

Career information
- College: Oklahoma
- NFL draft: 2007: undrafted

Career history
- Green Bay Packers (2007)*; Tennessee Titans (2008)*
- * Offseason or practice squad member only

Paul Thompson (born November 23, 1983) is an American former football quarterback. He was signed by the Green Bay Packers as an undrafted free agent in 2007. He played college football at Oklahoma. He was also a member of the Tennessee Titans.

== Early life ==
Thompson attended Leander High School in Leander, Texas and was a letterman in football, basketball, and track. In football, as a senior, he passed for 1,600 yards and rushed for 1,053 yards.

== College career ==
Thompson was ranked as the #8 athlete in the country upon entering college. He had been courted by both the University of Texas and Oklahoma but chose to play for the Sooners because they would give him the opportunity to play quarterback. He turned down Texas due to the fact they wanted him to play as a wide receiver. Ironically, after former Oklahoma quarterback Rhett Bomar took over as the starter in 2005, Thompson asked to be moved to the wide receiver position.

=== 2002 season ===
He arrived on campus in the fall of 2002 as a backup to both Jason White and Nate Hybl. He was scheduled to be redshirted that season. During the second game of the year against Alabama, starter Jason White hurt his knee, forcing Hybl to take his spot. More importantly for Thompson was that he would not be redshirted in 2002. He would receive playing time in four games, but did not start, remaining the second-string quarterback.

=== 2003 season ===
After the Sooner Rose Bowl win, Hybl graduated, leaving White and Thompson the quarterback job. Jason White earned the top spot, once again leaving Thompson on the bench. White led the team, and ultimately ended up winning the Heisman Trophy. Paul played in 10 games in 2003.

=== 2004 season ===
Thompson expected to have the job all to himself in 2004, but special circumstances allowed Jason White to play another year. White led the team to an undefeated regular season. Thompson was redshirted for the season.

=== 2005 season ===
With Jason White gone, Paul would battle with Rhett Bomar for the starting spot. Thompson earned the starting role against TCU in the first game of the season. Thompson was benched in the middle of the game in favor of Bomar. From then on, Bomar would take most of the snaps under center, leaving Thompson to a new position, wide receiver.

=== 2006 season ===
In his last collegiate season, chances for Thompson to start at quarterback or wide receiver looked unlikely. On August 2, 2006 Rhett Bomar and offensive lineman J.D. Quinn were dismissed from the football team. Thompson regained the duties of the starting quarterback for the Sooners. His first game as starter for the 2006 season was a 24–17 victory on September 2, 2006, against UAB. Thompson threw for 227 yards with two interceptions and two touchdown passes, including a 69-yard pass to Adrian Peterson for a touchdown. It was soon after this performance that Thompson would be renamed Paul "Prime-Time" Thompson.

After going 3–2 in their first five games, he helped lead the Sooners to 8 straight wins, including the Big 12 Championship Game win over Nebraska in Kansas City. This win propelled the Sooners to a BCS berth in the Fiesta Bowl on New Years Day. The Sooners lost this game in overtime to Boise State University in a very close game, in which Paul Thompson threw three interceptions and lost a fumble. Paul then was later added into The Oklahoma Sooner Hall of Fame.

== Professional career ==
=== Green Bay Packers ===
Thompson signed as an undrafted free agent on May 16, 2007.

=== Tennessee Titans ===
On January 9, 2008, Thompson signed with the Tennessee Titans. He was waived on July 24.
