= Reggie Smith (defensive back) =

American football player (born 1986)

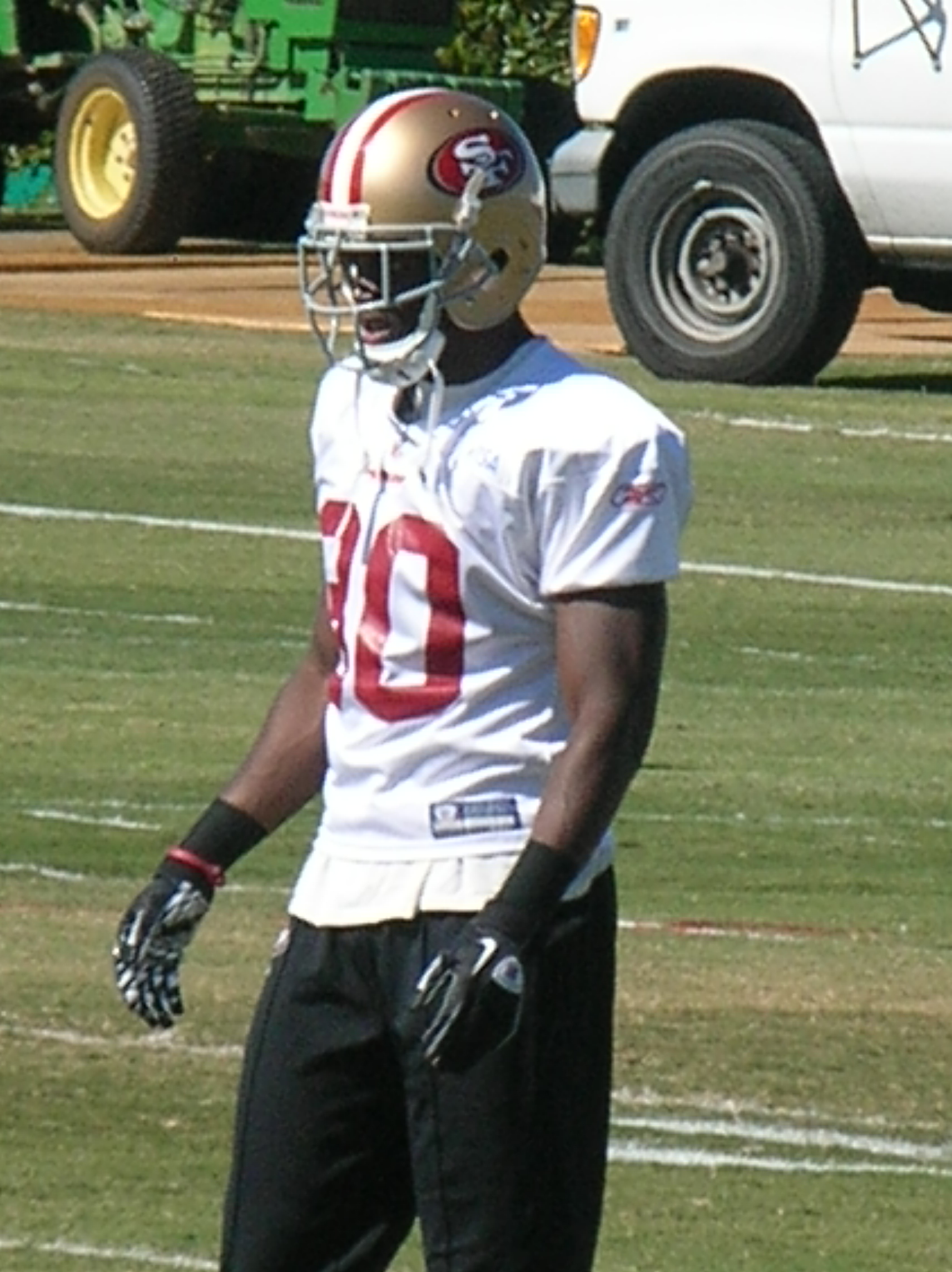
- Smith with the San Francisco 49ers in 2010

No. 30, 31
- Position: Safety

Personal information
- Born: September 3, 1986 (age 40); Edmond, Oklahoma, U.S.
- Listed height: 6 ft 1 in (1.85 m)
- Listed weight: 200 lb (91 kg)

Career information
- High school: Edmond Santa Fe
- College: Oklahoma
- NFL draft: 2008: 3rd round, 75th overall pick

Career history
- San Francisco 49ers (2008–2011); Carolina Panthers (2012)*; Oakland Raiders (2013)*
- * Offseason or practice squad member only

Awards and highlights
- Freshman All-American (2005); 2× First-team All-Big 12 (2006, 2007); Second-team Coaches' All-Big 12 (2006); Freshman All-Big 12 (2005)

Career NFL statistics
- Total tackles: 64
- Pass deflections: 7
- Interceptions: 2
- Stats at Pro Football Reference

Reginald Smith, Jr. (born September 3, 1986) is an American former professional football player who was a safety in the National Football League (NFL). He was selected by the San Francisco 49ers in the third round of the 2008 NFL draft. He played college football for the Oklahoma Sooners.

== College career ==
Smith was named the preseason Big 12 Defensive Player of the Year for the 2007 season. He finished the year ranked fourth on the team with 78 tackles and also added three interceptions.

== Professional career ==
=== San Francisco 49ers ===
Smith was selected by the San Francisco 49ers in the third round (75th overall) of the 2008 NFL draft. He appeared in three games as a rookie, recording three tackles.

In the 2009 offseason, it was reported that Smith would convert from cornerback to safety. In July 2009, he changed his number to 30, and gave 31 to teammate Dre Bly. He had his first career interception for a touchdown against the Indianapolis Colts.

Smith started the 2010 season as the backup to Dashon Goldson and Michael Lewis. But after Lewis requested his release prior to the week 4 game in Atlanta, Taylor Mays was named starter and held that role for the next 7 weeks. Reggie was named starter in week 11 vs the Tampa Bay Buccaneers.

=== Carolina Panthers ===
Smith signed with the Carolina Panthers on April 4, 2012. He was released on August 31, 2012 in the last roster cuts for the Panthers.

=== Oakland Raiders ===
Smith signed with the Oakland Raiders on April 10, 2013. He was released August 31, 2013.
