= 2006 Nebraska Cornhuskers football team =

American college football season

2006 Nebraska Cornhuskers football

Big 12 North Division champion

Big 12 Championship Game, L 7–21 vs. Oklahoma

Cotton Bowl Classic, L 14–17 vs. Auburn
- Conference: Big 12 Conference
- North Division
- Record: 9–5 (6–2 Big 12)
- Head coach: Bill Callahan (3rd season)
- Offensive coordinator: Jay Norvell (3rd season)
- Offensive scheme: West Coast
- Defensive coordinator: Kevin Cosgrove (3rd season)
- Base defense: 4–3
- Home stadium: Memorial Stadium

2006 Big 12 Conference football standings
	Conf.			Overall
Team	W		L	W		L
North Division
Nebraska x	6	–	2	9	–	5
Missouri	4	–	4	8	–	5
Kansas State	4	–	4	7	–	6
Kansas	3	–	5	6	–	6
Colorado	2	–	6	2	–	10
Iowa State	1	–	7	4	–	8
South Division
No. 11 Oklahoma x$	7	–	1	11	–	3
No. 13 Texas	6	–	2	10	–	3
Texas A&M	5	–	3	9	–	4
Texas Tech	4	–	4	8	–	5
Oklahoma State	3	–	5	7	–	6
Baylor	3	–	5	4	–	8
Championship: Oklahoma 21, Nebraska 7
$ – BCS representative as conference champion; x – Division champion/co-champions; Rankings from AP Poll

The 2006 Nebraska Cornhuskers football team represented the University of Nebraska–Lincoln in the 2006 NCAA Division I FBS football season. The team was coached by Bill Callahan and played their home games at Memorial Stadium in Lincoln, Nebraska.

== Before the season ==
While the Huskers lost talented running back Cory Ross and defensive back Daniel Bullocks, they did retain offensive lynchpin Zac Taylor (QB) and talented kicker Jordon Congdon. The team also hoped to play I-back Marlon Lucky (who excelled on kick returns as a freshman) as their starting running back. Terrence Nunn, the top kick-returner in the Big 12 last season, also returned and was intended to be the Huskers' featured receiver.

On defense, the Blackshirts include DE Adam Carriker, among others. The Ruud name returned to Lincoln, with Bo Ruud playing weakside linebacker.

== Schedule ==
Date	Time	Opponent	Rank	Site	TV	Result	Attendance
September 2	2:30 pm	Louisiana Tech*	No. 20	Memorial Stadium; Lincoln, NE	FSN	W 49–10	85,181
September 9	12:30 pm	Nicholls State*	No. 21	Memorial Stadium; Lincoln, NE		W 56–7	84,076
September 16	7:00 pm	at No. 4 USC*	No. 19	Los Angeles Memorial Coliseum; Los Angeles, CA (College GameDay)	ABC	L 10–28	92,000
September 23	6:00 pm	Troy*	No. 23	Memorial Stadium; Lincoln, NE	FSN	W 56–0	84,799
September 30	6:00 pm	Kansas	No. 21	Memorial Stadium; Lincoln, NE (rivalry)	FSN	W 39–32 ^{OT}	85,069
October 7	7:00 pm	at Iowa State	No. 22	Jack Trice Stadium; Ames, IA (rivalry)	ABC	W 28–14	55,338
October 14	7:00 pm	at Kansas State	No. 21	Bill Snyder Family Football Stadium; Manhattan, KS (rivalry)	FSN	W 21–3	50,723
October 21	11:00 am	No. 5 Texas	No. 17	Memorial Stadium; Lincoln, NE	ABC	L 20–22	85,187
October 28	2:30 pm	at Oklahoma State	No. 20	Boone Pickens Stadium; Stillwater, OK	ABC	L 29–41	40,108
November 4	11:00 am	Missouri^{†}		Memorial Stadium; Lincoln, NE (rivalry)	ABC	W 34–20	85,197
November 11	2:30 pm	at No. 24 Texas A&M		Kyle Field; College Station, TX	ABC	W 28–27	85,336
November 24	2:30 pm	Colorado	No. 23	Memorial Stadium; Lincoln, NE (rivalry)	ABC	W 37–14	85,800
December 2	7:00 pm	vs. No. 8 Oklahoma	No. 19	Arrowhead Stadium; Kansas City, MO (Big 12 Championship) (rivalry)	ABC	L 7–21	80,031
January 1, 2007	10:30 am	vs. No. 10 Auburn*	No. 22	Cotton Bowl; Dallas, TX (Cotton Bowl Classic)	FOX	L 14–17	66,777
*Non-conference game; ^{†}Homecoming; Rankings from AP Poll released prior to the game; All times are in Central time

== Rankings ==
Ranking movements Legend: ██ Increase in ranking ██ Decrease in ranking — = Not ranked RV = Received votes
	Week															
Poll	Pre	1	2	3	4	5	6	7	8	9	10	11	12	13	14	Final
AP	20	21	19	23	21	22	21	17	20	RV	RV	24	23	19	22	RV
Coaches Poll	22	21	19	24	21	22	20	16	20	RV	25	22	19	18	22	RV
Harris	Not released				21	21	19	16	20	—	25	23	22	20	22	Not released
BCS	Not released							17	22	—	—	23	22	20	23	Not released

== Roster and coaching staff ==
2006 Nebraska Cornhuskers football team roster
Players
Coaches
Offense

Pos.	#	Name	Class
OL	65	Greg Austin	Sr
OL	66	Cruz Barrett	Fr
OL	57	Bergland Dennis	Fr
WR	1	Chris Brooks	So
OL	59	Brett Byford	Jr
WR	82	Wes Cammack	RFr
OL	62	Andy Christensen	So
QB	15	Beau Davis	So
WR	26	Dan Erickson	Jr
FB	47	Paul Farino	RFr
QB	12	Joe Ganz	So
TE	39	Dan Glassman	Fr
IB	34	Cody Glenn	So
OL	75	Victory Haines	Jr
WR	7	Frantz Hardy	Jr
WR	9	Will Henry	Fr
TE	11	Matt Herian	Sr
OL	67	Jacob Hickman	Fr
QB	8	Brian Hildebrand	So
TE	86	Sean Hill	Jr
WR	4	Menelik Holt	Fr
OL	61	Mike Huff	So
IB	32	Brandon Jackson	Jr
OL	73	D.J. Jones	Fr
QB	5	Sam Keller	Sr
WR	30	Patrick Kitzul	Fr
FB	40	Colton Koehler	RFr
RB	36	Thomas Lawson	So
OL	74	Newton Lingenfelter	Sr
IB	20	Marlon Lucky	So
OL	50	Kurt Mann	Sr
TE	44	Mike McNeill	Fr
TE	81	Josh Mueller	Jr
OL	76	Lydon Murtha	So
OL	77	Carl Nicks	Jr
WR	83	Terrence Nunn	Jr
FB	45	Will Otto	Sr
OL	54	Chris Patrick	Jr
WR	17	Todd Peterson	So
TE	85	J.B. Phillips	Jr
OL	69	Jordan Picou	Jr
WR	16	Maurice Purify	Jr
OL	79	Chad Roark	Fr
WR	84	Xavier Rucker	Fr
FB	48	Andy Sand	Jr
FB	42	Matt Senske	Jr
OL	70	Matt Slauson	So
WR	87	Nate Swift	So
TE	46	Ben Tasa	Fr
QB	13	Zac Taylor (C)	Sr
TE	89	Hunter Teafatiller	So
FB	41	Dane Todd	Sr
OL	68	Keith Williams	Fr
IB	27	Kenny Wilson	Jr
TE	49	Dreu Young	Fr

Defense

Pos.	#	Name	Class
S	7	Jordan Adams	Jr
DL	95	Pierre Allen	Fr
CB	1	Zackary Bowman	Sr
LB	34	Stewart Bradley	Sr
LB	40	Lance Brandenburgh	Jr
DB	21	Titus Brothers	Jr
DE	90	Adam Carriker (C)	Sr
LB	45	Nick Covey	RFr
DL	94	Barry Cryer	Sr
DB	6	Major Culbert	Fr
DL	54	Ola Dagunduro	Sr
LB	52	Phillip Dillard	So
DB	46	Ben Eisenhart	Jr
CB	28	Isaiah Fluellen	Sr
DB	27	Ryan Ford	Fr
S	30	Tierre Green	Jr
CB	2	Cortney Grixby	Jr
DE	80	David Harvey	RFr
DT	71	Zach Jepson	Fr
DT	91	Seth Jensen	Fr
DT	96	Brandon Johnson	Jr
DB	25	Andre Jones	Jr
LB	47	Andy Kadavy	Sr
DL	89	Kevin Luhrs	Jr
DE	63	Ben Martin	Fr
LB	13	Corey McKeon	Jr
LB	58	Andy McNeil	Fr
DE	44	Jay Moore	Sr
LB	38	Kyle Moore	Fr
DB	33	Matt O'Hanlon	RFr
LB	50	Mark O'Shea	Sr
LB	15	Steve Octavien	Jr
DE	98	Zach Potter	So
DE	86	Andy Poulosky	Jr
DE	85	Thomas Rice	Jr
FS	24	Brandon Rigoni (C)	Sr
DL	55	Craig Roark	RFr
LB	51	Bo Ruud	Jr
S	8	Andrew Shanle	Sr
LB	88	Clayton Sievers	So
DE	97	Mike Smith	Fr
DL	43	Ty Steinkuhler	So
DL	93	Ndamukong Suh	RFr
DE	84	Tony Sullivan	Jr
CB	18	Tyrell Spain	Jr
DB	3	Rickey Thenarse	Fr
DE	99	Barry Turner	So
S	4	Adam Watson	Fr
DB	22	Anthony West	Fr
CB	9	Bryan Wilson	Jr
LB	53	Tyler Wortman	So
DB	23	Corey Young	Fr

Special teams

Pos.	#	Name	Class
LS	56	Justin Baumgartner	Fr
LS	52	Bryan Benzel	RFr
PK	29	Jordan Congdon	So
PK	94	Zach Egger	Fr
P	19	Tyler Kester	Jr
LS	55	Nathan McBride	RFr
LS	82	T.J. O'Leary	So
P	91	Michael Such	Fr
P	97	Dan Titchener	So
PK	37	Jake Wesch	So

Head coach

- Bill Callahan
  3rd season
  3rd year at Nebraska
  Alma mater: Benedictine

Coordinators/assistant coaches

- Jay Norvell
  3rd season as OC/QB coach
  3rd year at Nebraska
  Alma mater: Iowa
- Kevin Cosgrove
  3rd season as DC/LB coach
  3rd year at Nebraska
  Alma mater: UW-Oshkosh
- John Blake
  3rd season as DL coach
  3rd year at Nebraska
  Alma mater: Oklahoma
- Bill Busch
  3rd season as ST/S coach
  7th year at Nebraska
  Alma mater: Nebraska Wesleyan
- Phil Elmassian
  2nd season as CB coach
  3rd year at Nebraska
  Alma mater: William & Mary
- Ted Gilmore
  2nd season as WR coach
  2nd year at Nebraska
  Alma mater: Wyoming
- Randy Jordan
  3rd season as RB coach
  3rd year at Nebraska
  Alma mater: North Carolina
- Dennis Wagner
  3rd season as OL coach
  3rd year at Nebraska
  Alma mater: Utah
- Shawn Watson
  1st season as TE coach
  1st year at Nebraska
  Alma mater: Southern Illinois
- Dave Kennedy
  3rd season as S&C coach
  10th year at Nebraska
  Alma mater: Nebraska
- Keith Heckendorf
  1st season as GA coach
  1st year at Nebraska
  Alma mater: St. Cloud State
- Jon Osterhout
  1st season as GA coach
  1st year at Nebraska
  Alma mater: Sacramento State

Legend

- (C) Team captain
- (S) Suspended
- (I) Ineligible
- Injured
- Redshirt

Roster
Last update: January 16, 2011

=== Depth chart ===
Defense

FS
Tierre Green
Major Culbert
Ben Eisenhart
⋅

WILL	MIKE	SAM
Bo Ruud	Corey McKeon	Stewart Bradley
Steve Octavien	Lance Brandenburgh	Clayton Sievers
⋅	⋅	⋅

SS
Andrew Shanle
Bryan Wilson
⋅

CB
Cortney Grixby
Corey Young
⋅

DE	DT	DT	DE
Jay Moore	Ola Dagunduro	Barry Cryer	Adam Carriker
Barry Turner	Ndamukong Suh	Ty Steinkuhler	Zach Potter
⋅	⋅	⋅	⋅

CB
Andre Jones
Rickey Thenarse
⋅

Offense

WR
Terrence Nunn
Nate Swift
Todd Peterson
⋅

LT	LG	C	RG	RT
Chris Patrick	Greg Austin	Brett Byford	Mike Huff	Matt Slauson
Carl Nicks	Andy Christensen	Kurt Mann	Jacob Hickman	Lydon Murtha
⋅	⋅	⋅	⋅	⋅

TE
Matt Herian
Josh Mueller
J.B Phillips
⋅

WR
Maurice Purify
Frantz Hardy
⋅

QB
Zac Taylor
Joe Ganz
⋅

RB
Brandon Jackson
Marlon Lucky
Cody Glenn
Kenny Wilson
⋅

FB
Dana Todd
Matt Senske
⋅

Special teams
PK Jordan Congdon
P Dan Titchener
KR Brandon Jackson
Marlon Lucky
PR Terrence Nunn
LS \

== Game summaries ==
=== Louisiana Tech ===
Louisiana Tech at Nebraska [box score]

Team	1	2	3	4	Total
Louisiana Tech	0	10	0	0	10
• Nebraska	7	14	7	21	49

- Location: Memorial Stadium, Lincoln, Nebraska
- Game start: 2:30 p.m. CST
- Game attendance: 85,181
- TV announcers (FSN): Bill Land (Play-by-play), Dave Lapham (Color), & Emily Jones (Sideline)

=== Nicholls State ===
Nicholls State at Nebraska [box score]

Team	1	2	3	4	Total
Nicholls State	0	0	0	7	7
• Nebraska	14	14	14	14	56

- Location: Memorial Stadium, Lincoln, Nebraska
- Game start: 12:30 p.m. CST
- Game attendance: 84,076

=== USC ===
Nebraska at USC [box score]

Team	1	2	3	4	Total
Nebraska	3	0	0	7	10
• USC	7	7	7	7	28

- Location: Los Angeles Memorial Coliseum, Los Angeles
- Game start: 7:00 p.m. CST
- Game attendance: 92,000
- TV announcers (ABC): Brent Musburger (Play-by-play), Bob Davie (Color), Kirk Herbstreit (Color), & Lisa Salters (Sideline)

=== Troy ===
Troy at Nebraska [box score]

Team	1	2	3	4	Total
Troy	0	0	0	0	0
• Nebraska	14	14	14	14	56

- Location: Memorial Stadium, Lincoln, Nebraska
- Game start: 6:00 p.m. CST
- Game attendance: 84,799
- TV announcers (PPV): Greg Sharpe (Play-by-play), Matt Davison (Color), & Dan McLaughlin (Sideline)

=== Kansas ===
Kansas at Nebraska [box score]

Team	1	2	3	4	OT	Total
Kansas	0	10	9	13	0	32
• Nebraska	17	7	0	8	7	39

- Date: September 30, 2006
- Location: Memorial Stadium, Lincoln, Nebraska
- Game start: 6:00 p.m. CST
- Game attendance: 85,069
- TV announcers (FSN): Joel Meyers (Play-by-play), Dave Lapham (Color), & Jim Knox (Sideline)

=== Iowa State ===
Nebraska at Iowa State [box score]

Team	1	2	3	4	Total
• Nebraska	7	14	0	7	28
Iowa State	0	7	0	7	14

- Date: October 7, 2006
- Location: Jack Trice Stadium, Ames, Iowa
- Game start: 7:00 p.m. CST
- Game attendance: 55,338
- TV announcers (ABC): Dan Fouts (Play-by-play), Tim Brant (Color), & Jack Arute (Sideline)

=== Kansas State ===
Nebraska at Kansas State [box score]

Team	1	2	3	4	Total
• Nebraska	7	7	7	0	21
Kansas State	0	0	3	0	3

- Date: October 14, 2006
- Location: Bill Snyder Family Football Stadium, Manhattan, Kansas
- Game start: 7:00 p.m. CST
- Game attendance: 50,723
- TV announcers (PPV): Dan McLaughlin (Play-by-play), Rich Baldinger (Color), & Brent Stover (Sideline)

Nebraska won their 800th football game with a win over Kansas State on October 14, 2006. Only four teams have won 800 or more games: Michigan, Notre Dame, Texas, and now Nebraska.

=== Texas ===
Texas at Nebraska [box score]

Team	1	2	3	4	Total
• Texas	3	13	0	6	22
Nebraska	7	0	0	13	20

- Date: October 21, 2006
- Location: Memorial Stadium, Lincoln, Nebraska
- Game start: 11:00 a.m. CST
- Game attendance: 85,187
- TV announcers (ABC): Brent Musburger (Play-by-play), Bob Davie (Color), & Lisa Salters (Sideline)

The Cornhuskers entered the game against the 2006 Texas Longhorn football team ranked 16th in both human polls and 19th in the computer rankings, for a total BCS ranking of 17th. Coming into the game, Texas was the third-winningest program in college football, with 800 wins. Nebraska was fourth, having won their 800th game the previous weekend vs Kansas State. Only four teams have won 800 or more games: Michigan, Notre Dame, Texas, and now Nebraska. The game marked the first time for Texas to face an 800-win program since Texas broke through the 800-win barrier. The 2006 football season also marked the first time for four 800-win programs to face off against each other, with Notre Dame and Michigan having played each other earlier in the season.

In terms of winning percentage, Texas ranked third at 71.52% while Nebraska ranked seventh at 70.57%. The Cornhuskers claimed five national championships on top of Texas' four. The environment at Lincoln has been considered one of the most hostile for an opposing team, due in part to the noise of the crowd.

Austin American-Statesman columnist Kirk Bohls predicted that Nebraska might pull off an upset against the Longhorns. Among the reasons he gave were that "Texas isn't a great running team (only a good one).." that "Texas' pass defense is very suspect..." and that Longhorn kicker Greg Johnson had only kicked one field goal all year. Bohls also speculated that Nebraska might have more motivation because "Texas has had Nebraska's number for a while, ... [Texas] knocked off the Huskers in the inaugural Big 12 football championship game at St. Louis to deprive Nebraska of a shot at another national title in 1996." In 1998, freshman quarterback Major Applewhite led the Longhorns to a victory over the seventh-ranked Cornhuskers, snapping their 47-home game winning streak. They also ended the Cornhuskers new streak at 26 in 2002. Coming into the 2006 game, Texas was the only team in the Big Twelve Conference with a winning record vs. Nebraska, with a 6–4 lead. Texas leads the series 5–1 since the formation of the Big 12, and they are 4–1 against Nebraska since Mack Brown came to Texas.

Prior to the game, the betting line in Las Vegas casinos was Texas by 5 ½ points. The game set a new stadium attendance record crowd of 85,187, the 280th consecutive sell-out at Nebraska. The game featured 36-degree temperatures, winds out of the north at 20 miles per hour, rain, and snow flurries.

Texas got the ball to start the game and Quan Cosby returned the kick-off to within the Nebraska 10 yard line. The Longhorns were unable to score a touchdown and had to settle for a field goal. Nebraska scored a first-quarter touchdown. Texas scored 14 points in the second quarter, but kicker Greg Johnson had one of the two extra points blocked, so the score at half-time had Texas ahead 16 to 7. Johnson also missed two field goals during the game. Neither team scored in the third quarter.

In the fourth quarter, Nebraska took a 20–19 lead with 4 minutes 54 seconds left in the game. After Texas was forced to punt, Nebraska only had to run out the clock to ensure victory. Nebraska ran a passing play on third down and NU receiver Terrence Nunn picked up the first down but fumbled the ball. The fumble was recovered by Texas safety Marcus Griffin at the Nebraska 44 yard-line with 2:17 left. Colt McCoy led the Longhorns through the snow flurries to the Nebraska 5. With less than a minute remaining, and the Horns facing fourth down, Texas needed a field goal to win.

Johnson had already missed three kicks (two field goals and an extra point) and he told Coach Brown late in the game that his leg was tightening up. Brown looked to walk-on sophomore Ryan Bailey to give the Longhorns the win. Bailey had made only 10 kicks as a high-school kicker from Anderson High School in Austin, Texas and he had never attempted a kick for the Longhorns. The trip at Nebraska was only the second time he had ever been included in the travel roster, which is limited to 64 players. Before the kick, Brown told him "You're the luckiest guy in the world. You've got a chance to be Dusty Mangum on your first kick." Mangum had scored the game-winning field goal as time expired to lift the Longhorns to victory over the Michigan Wolverines in the 2005 Rose Bowl.

Before Bailey could attempt the kick, Nebraska's coach attempted to "ice the kicker" by using his coach's challenge to have the officials review the preceding third-down play. The play was reviewed and allowed to stand as an incomplete pass, as called on the field. Brown gave Bailey a swat on the helmet and Bailey jogged onto the field and calmly made the kick. Nebraska had time for two shots at the end-zone but both passes were broken up, and Texas won the game by 2 points, 22–20.

The win was Texas' 16th straight road game victory, extending a school record, and 19th consecutive win in conference play. The latter streak is the second longest in the country, following the conference game winning steak of USC. The game was the first time for Colt McCoy to lead the Longhorns to a come-from-behind victory in the fourth quarter.

The Longhorns had several injuries during the game. Defensive starters Derek Lokey and Robert Killebrew both had to leave the game due to leg injuries. Cornerback Tarell Brown was seen limping badly after the game and kicker-punter Greg Johnson aggravated a previous injury on his fourth-quarter field goal.

Former Longhorn quarterback Vince Young was on the sidelines for the first time since going to the NFL and he went to the Longhorn locker room afterwards to congratulate the team on the win. Representatives from the Fiesta Bowl, the game that normally takes the Big 12 Conference champion, were also on hand.

There had been media speculation that Nebraska and Texas would win their respective conference divisions to play again in the Big 12 Conference Championship. This possibility was echoed in post-game interviews as both teams voiced respect for the other. Texas coach Mack Brown said, "Nebraska is back, For them to keep coming back and back and back – they made big plays throughout the game to put themselves in a position to win." He continued, "As soon as they back away from it, they'll see that their program is back on track, one of the best in the country. And they'll be excited about a chance to go play somebody in (the Big 12 championship game). Hopefully, if we can keep playing, it might be us." Nebraska cornerback Cortney Grixby said of Texas, "They kept their composure. That's the mark of a champion. And that's what they are."

=== Oklahoma State ===
Nebraska at Oklahoma State [box score]

Team	1	2	3	4	Total
Nebraska	10	13	0	6	29
• Oklahoma State	0	20	0	21	41

- Date: October 28, 2006
- Location: Boone Pickens Stadium, Stillwater, Oklahoma
- Game start: 2:30 p.m. CST
- Game attendance: 40,108
- TV announcers (ABC): Dave Barnett (Play-by-play), Ray Bentley (Color), & Vince Welch (Sideline)

=== Missouri ===
Missouri at Nebraska [box score]

Team	1	2	3	4	Total
Missouri	0	6	7	7	20
• Nebraska	10	17	0	7	34

- Date: November 4, 2006
- Location: Memorial Stadium, Lincoln, Nebraska
- Game start: 11:00 a.m. CST
- Game attendance: 85,197
- TV announcers (ABC): Gary Thorne (Play-by-play), Andre Ware (Color), & Dave LaMont (Sideline)

=== Texas A&M ===
Nebraska at Texas A&M [box score]

Team	1	2	3	4	Total
• Nebraska	7	14	0	7	28
Texas A&M	7	3	3	14	27

- Date: November 11, 2006
- Location: Kyle Field, College Station, Texas
- Game start: 2:30 p.m. CST
- Game attendance: 85,336
- TV announcers (ABC): Eric Collins (Play-by-play), David Norrie (Color), & Stacey Dales (Sideline)

=== Colorado ===
Colorado at Nebraska [box score]

Team	1	2	3	4	Total
Colorado	7	0	7	0	14
• Nebraska	7	7	7	16	37

- Date: November 24, 2006
- Location: Memorial Stadium, Lincoln, Nebraska
- Game start: 2:30 p.m. CST
- Game attendance: 85,800
- TV announcers (ABC): Mark Jones (Play-by-play), David Norrie (Color), & Stacey Dales (Sideline)

=== Oklahoma ===
Nebraska vs Oklahoma [box score]

Team	1	2	3	4	Total
Nebraska	0	7	0	0	7
• Oklahoma	14	0	7	0	21

- Date: December 2, 2006
- Location: Arrowhead Stadium, Kansas City, Missouri
- Game start: 7:00 p.m. CST
- Game attendance: 80,031
- TV announcers (ABC): Mike Patrick (Play-by-play), Todd Blackledge (Color), & Holly Rowe (Sideline)

Called "The Battle of the Big Reds", the rivalry between Nebraska and Oklahoma was one of the most heated contests of the old Big Eight Conference. Played every Thanksgiving weekend for 71 years (from 1927 to 1998), this contest produced many memorable games; including the Game of the Century in 1971. The rivalry has cooled somewhat since the creation of the Big 12 as Bill Callahan's Nebraska Cornhuskers and Stoops's Oklahoma Sooners now split a home-and-home two of every four years.

This is only the fourth time that the teams have met at a neutral site. The last time was the 1979 Orange Bowl where the Sooners won 31–24. Oklahoma holds the lead in the all-time series 42 to 37 with 3 ties and has never lost to Nebraska on neutral turf (one 7–7 tie in 1919 in Omaha). Bob Stoops is 3–1 against Nebraska and has a two-game winning streak; Callahan has never beaten Oklahoma.

This is the first time the two teams have met in the Big 12 Championship Game to determine the Big 12 Conference champion. Nebraska played in the championship game three of the first four years, winning in 1997 and '99, but had not made it back since. Oklahoma missed the first four games but represented the south four of the next six years, topping the conference in 2000, '02, and '04. Oklahoma has both the most appearances in the championship game (5) and conference titles (3) of any team in the Big 12.

Nebraska received the ball to start the game but Maurice Purify fumbled on the first play from scrimmage. Oklahoma recovered the ball at the Nebraska 2 and scored a touchdown to take the lead 7–0 with 48 seconds expired off the clock. It was the fastest score in Big 12 Championship Game history. With 5:35 left in the first quarter, Oklahoma executed a touchdown pass to Malcolm Kelly to go up 14–0.

With 4:37 left in the first half, Nebraska's Zac Taylor threw a touchdown pass and the extra point shaved Oklahoma's lead to 14–7, which was still the score as the game went to half-time.

At the start of the half, Oklahoma started with the ball but were unable to advance, as Nebraska recorded their first quarterback sack of the game and caused Oklahoma to go three-and-out and punt. Later in the third quarter, Oklahoma used 11 plays, 3 minutes and 21 seconds, to go 99 yards and score a touchdown with 1:25 left in the third quarter.

With 8:53 left in the game, Nebraska threw what was almost a touchdown pass, but Nick Harris made a diving catch to intercept the ball in the end-zone for a touchback. Neither team scored in the fourth quarter, so Oklahoma won the game 21–7. It was their fourth Big 12 Conference football championship, which is the most for any team in the conference (Nebraska and Texas each have two).

=== Auburn (Cotton Bowl Classic) ===
Nebraska vs Auburn [box score]

Team	1	2	3	4	Total
• Auburn	7	7	3	0	17
Nebraska	7	7	0	0	14

- Date: January 1, 2007
- Location: Cotton Bowl, Dallas, Texas
- Game start: 10:30 a.m. CST
- Game attendance: 66,777
- TV announcers (FOX): Pat Summerall (Play-by-play), Brian Baldinger (Color), & Krista Voda (Sideline)

If Nebraska had won the Big 12 Conference Championship Game, they would have gone to the Fiesta Bowl. Since they lost, they went to the Cotton Bowl Classic; the Big 12 Conference announced before the Championship Game that the loser would receive a Cotton Bowl Classic invitation. The Cotton Bowl Classic was played on New Year's Day.

== After the season ==
=== Awards ===
Award	Name(s)
Big 12 Offensive Player of the Year	Zac Taylor
Big 12 Defensive Lineman of the Year	Adam Carriker
All-Big 12 1st team	Zac Taylor, Adam Carriker, Dane Todd, Bo Ruud, Brandon Jackson
All-Big 12 2nd team	Maurice Purify, Jay Moore, Matt Slauson, Marlon Lucky
All-Big 12 honorable mention	Stewart Bradley, Brett Byford, Cortney Grixby, Corey McKeon, Andrew Shanle, Kurt Mann, Greg Austin, Tierre Green
All-Big 12 Freshman 1st team	Ndamukong Suh

=== NFL and pro players ===
The following Nebraska players who participated in the 2006 season later moved on to the next level and joined a professional or semi-pro team as draftees or free agents.

Name	Team
Zackary Bowman	Chicago Bears
Stewart Bradley	Philadelphia Eagles
Adam Carriker	St. Louis Rams
Joe Ganz	Washington Redskins
Cody Glenn	Washington Redskins
Cortney Grixby	Carolina Panthers
Brandon Jackson	Green Bay Packers
D.J. Jones	Omaha Nighthawks
Marlon Lucky	Cincinnati Bengals
Jay Moore	San Francisco 49ers
Lydon Murtha	Detroit Lions
Carl Nicks	New Orleans Saints
Terrence Nunn	New England Patriots
Steve Octavien	Kansas City Chiefs
Chris Patrick	New York Giants
Todd Peterson	Jacksonville Jaguars
Zach Potter	New York Jets
Andy Poulosky	Sioux City Bandits
Maurice Purify	Cincinnati Bengals
Bo Ruud	New England Patriots
Andrew Shanle	Chicago Bears
Matt Slauson	New York Jets
Mike Smith	Omaha Nighthawks
Ty Steinkuhler	New York Jets
Nate Swift	Denver Broncos
Zac Taylor	Tampa Bay Buccaneers
Keith Williams	Pittsburgh Steelers
Kenny Wilson	Sioux City Bandits
