= Zac Taylor =

American football coach (born 1983)

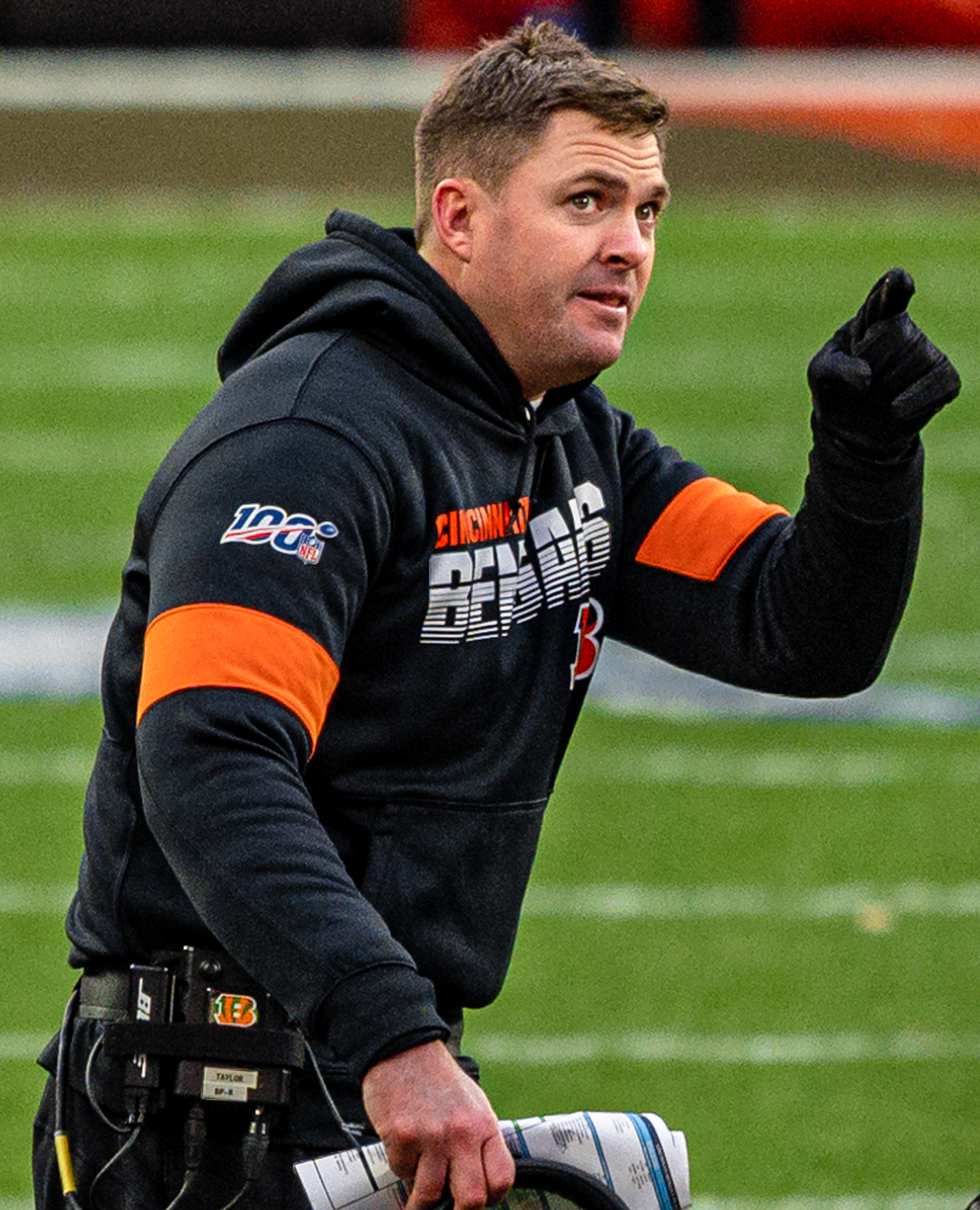
- Taylor with the Cincinnati Bengals in 2019

Cincinnati Bengals
- Title: Head coach

Personal information
- Born: May 10, 1983 (age 43); Norman, Oklahoma, U.S.
- Listed height: 6 ft 2 in (1.88 m)
- Listed weight: 210 lb (95 kg)

Career information
- Position: Quarterback
- High school: Norman
- College: Wake Forest (2002–2003); Butler (KS) (2004); Nebraska (2005–2006)
- NFL draft: 2007: undrafted

Career history

Playing
- Tampa Bay Buccaneers (2007)*; Winnipeg Blue Bombers (2007)*
- * Offseason or practice squad member only

Coaching
- Texas A&M (2008–2011) Graduate assistant; Miami Dolphins (2012–2015); Assistant quarterbacks coach (2012); Quarterbacks coach (2013–2014); Offensive coordinator & quarterbacks coach (2015); Cincinnati (2016) Offensive coordinator & quarterbacks coach; Los Angeles Rams (2017–2018); Assistant wide receivers coach (2017); Quarterbacks coach (2018); Cincinnati Bengals (2019–present) Head coach

Awards and highlights
- As player: Big 12 Offensive Player of the Year (2006); First-team All-Big 12 (2006); As coach: Greasy Neale Award (2021)

Head coaching record
- Regular season: 59–65–1 (.476)
- Postseason: 5–2 (.714)
- Career: 64–67–1 (.489)
- Coaching profile at Pro Football Reference

Zachary William Taylor (born May 10, 1983) is an American professional football coach and former quarterback who is the head coach for the Cincinnati Bengals of the National Football League (NFL). He played college football for the Wake Forest Deacons, Butler Grizzlies, and Nebraska Cornhuskers before signing with the Tampa Bay Buccaneers in 2007 as an undrafted free agent.

Taylor was named Cincinnati's head coach in 2019, where he went 6–25–1 in his first two years. In 2021, Taylor led the Bengals to their first playoff win since 1990, ending the longest active drought in the four major North American sports, en route to an appearance in Super Bowl LVI. Taylor followed this up with 12 wins and a trip to the AFC Championship Game in 2022. During his time with the Bengals, Taylor has won five postseason games, matching the franchise total prior to his hiring as head coach.

== College career ==
=== Early collegiate career ===
Despite Taylor's record-setting career at Norman High School in Norman, Oklahoma, few colleges recruited him. In 2002, Taylor signed with Wake Forest, where he redshirted his first year and filled in as a backup position the next, completing the only pass he attempted in those two years. From there, Taylor transferred to Butler Community College in Kansas, where he had a breakout season, leading Butler to the NJCAA championship game and earning second-team NJCAA All-American honors.

=== Nebraska ===
After his 2004 season Taylor looked at multiple NCAA Division I schools, including Memphis, Marshall and Nebraska. Nebraska had abandoned their long standing running/option offense for an entirely new, West Coast offense led by newly appointed coach Bill Callahan. The Huskers had a rebuilding season in 2004, going 5–6 and missing a bowl bid for the first time since 1968. His recruitment late in the 2004–05 off-season by the Huskers was described as a "lucky break" due to the Huskers' lack of quarterbacks at the time.

Taylor had a rough start, statistically speaking, in his 2005 year at Nebraska, completing 39 of 89 passes for 399 yards with a touchdown and three interceptions in his first three games. However, in his fourth game, Taylor had a breakout day against Iowa State, throwing for a school record 431 yards on 36 of 55 passing with two touchdowns. The 36 completions was also a school record at the time. He would struggle again five weeks later throwing for only 117 yards against Kansas as the Cornhuskers lost to the Jayhawks for the first time in 37 years. Taylor had up and down performances throughout the season, ending in a 30–3 victory over Colorado where he threw 392 yards, and a come-from-behind 32–28 victory over the Michigan Wolverines in the Alamo Bowl, where he threw a Nebraska bowl record three touchdown passes. Taylor broke the school record for passing yards in a season with 2,653 yards on 55.1% of his passes being complete.

In his 2006 opener against Louisiana Tech, Taylor showed significant improvement over his season-opener the previous year, completing 22 of 33 attempts for 287 yards with three touchdowns and one interception. In the next game against Nicholls State, Taylor once again showed his precision in passing the ball, finishing 19 of 23 for 202 yards and a new career-best in four touchdown passes.

Taylor led the Nebraska Cornhuskers to a record of 9–3 with an appearance in the 2006 Big 12 Championship Game, facing off against the Oklahoma Sooners. Taylor passed for 2,789 yards and 24 touchdown passes during the regular season and earned Big 12 Offensive Player of the Year.

=== Statistics ===
Year	Team	Games			Passing							Rushing			
Year	Team	GP	GS	Record	Cmp	Att	Yds	Pct	TD	Int	Rtg	Att	Yds	Avg	TD
2002	Wake Forest	0	0	—	(redshirt) Redshirted										
2002	Wake Forest	3	0	0–0	1	1	3	100.0	0	0	125.2	3	9	3.0	0
2004	Butler CC	10	10	10–0	172	274	2,682	62.8	27	8	171.7	26	−60	−2.3	0
2005	Nebraska	12	12	8–4	237	430	2,653	55.1	19	12	115.9	76	−41	−0.5	1
2006	Nebraska	14	14	9–5	233	391	3,197	59.6	26	8	146.1	60	−32	−0.5	1
Totals		29	26	17–9	470	821	5,850	57.2	45	20	130.3	139	-64	-0.5	2

== Professional career ==
Pre-draft measurables
Height	Weight	Arm length	Hand span	40-yard dash	10-yard split	20-yard split	20-yard shuttle	Three-cone drill	Vertical jump	Broad jump
6 ft 2 3/8 in (1.89 m)	216 lb (98 kg)	32 in (0.81 m)	9 in (0.23 m)	5.06 s	1.67 s	2.84 s	4.60 s	7.39 s	30.5 in (0.77 m)	9 ft 2 in (2.79 m)
All values from NFL Combine

Taylor went undrafted in the 2007 NFL draft. He was signed by the Tampa Bay Buccaneers but was cut, according to Taylor, as he was packing to leave for training camp. Taylor then went to Canada and joined the Winnipeg Blue Bombers in the CFL. He spent the season on the team's practice roster, but did not return for the 2008 season. The Blue Bombers lost the 95th Grey Cup that season.

== Coaching career ==
=== Texas A&M ===
Returning from Canada, Taylor became a graduate assistant and then tight ends coach at Texas A&M, serving four years under head coach Mike Sherman, his mentor and father-in-law.

=== Miami Dolphins ===
On January 30, 2012, Taylor was named assistant quarterbacks coach for the NFL's Miami Dolphins.

On November 30, 2015, Taylor was promoted to the team's interim offensive coordinator, after the firing of the previous offensive coordinator, Bill Lazor. During the five games Taylor served as offensive coordinator, the Dolphins went 2–3 and averaged 17 points per game, a slight regress from their per-game average under Lazor, though interim head coach Dan Campbell still had positive things to say about Taylor's performance.

=== University of Cincinnati ===
In January 2016, Taylor was hired by University of Cincinnati Bearcats head coach Tommy Tuberville to be the Bearcats' offensive coordinator. According to Taylor, Jim Turner, who had been an offensive line coach for the Dolphins, was the one who connected him with Tuberville. Taylor was seen as a "rising star in the coaching ranks" by the Bearcats, thanks to his experience in the NFL and his job developing Miami Dolphins quarterback Ryan Tannehill. Under Taylor's mentoring Tannehill became only the second Miami quarterback with multiple 3,000-yard seasons, as well as totaling the third-most passing yards for a quarterback in his first four seasons in NFL history, with 15,460.

=== Los Angeles Rams ===
In 2017, Taylor was hired by Los Angeles Rams head coach Sean McVay as assistant wide receivers coach. In 2018, Taylor was promoted to quarterbacks coach. That season, Taylor coached quarterback Jared Goff to the NFC Championship and an appearance in Super Bowl LIII on February 3, 2019.

=== Cincinnati Bengals ===
==== 2019 season ====
On February 4, 2019, Taylor was hired as head coach by the Cincinnati Bengals.

Taylor narrowly lost in his head coaching debut to the Seattle Seahawks by a score of 21–20. The Bengals lost their next 10 games, posting an 0–11 record, the worst start to a season in franchise history. Starting quarterback Andy Dalton was benched ahead of the Week 10 matchup against the Baltimore Ravens. Rookie Ryan Finley started the next three weeks, but after being ineffective, Dalton was renamed the starter before the Week 13 matchup against the New York Jets. By beating the Jets 22–6, Taylor recorded his first win as the Bengals' coach and snapped a franchise-record 13-game losing streak dating back to the previous season. The following week, the Bengals lost to the Cleveland Browns in Taylor's first head-to-head matchup against the division rivals, by a score of 27–19. After a Week 16 38–35 overtime road loss to the Miami Dolphins, the Bengals secured the first overall pick in the 2020 NFL draft. The Bengals finished the season with a 2–14 record following a 33–23 victory over the Browns in Week 17, matching a franchise-worst record set in 2002.

==== 2020 season ====
Taylor went into the 2020 season with first-overall pick Joe Burrow as the team's starting quarterback. It was also the first time since 2010 that the Bengals season began without Andy Dalton on the roster since Dalton was signed by the Dallas Cowboys in the offseason.

The Bengals lost their first game of the season to the Los Angeles Chargers by a score of 16–13. Taylor and the Bengals saw their first win of the season in a Week 4 33–25 victory over the Jacksonville Jaguars. A subsequent Week 5 loss to the Baltimore Ravens by a score of 27–3, in which Taylor called an offensive drive and field goal in the final seconds to prevent a shutout, dropped Taylor's road record with the Bengals to 0–11–1.

During Week 7, Taylor and the Bengals had a 34–31 lead over the Cleveland Browns with a minute left, but lost by a score of 37–34 following a touchdown drive by the Browns. It was the fifth time that season the Bengals lost a game despite having a lead during the fourth quarter. However, the Bengals pulled off a major 31–20 upset victory over the Tennessee Titans the following week.

During Week 11 against the Washington Football Team, Burrow suffered a season-ending knee injury. With Finley playing the rest of the game, the Bengals went on to lose 20–9. The Bengals' next win would be a Week 15 Monday Night Football matchup against the heavily favored Pittsburgh Steelers. With Finley at quarterback, the Bengals went on to defeat the Steelers 27–17. It was also Finley's first start of the season after Brandon Allen was elevated from the practice squad to be the starter following Burrow's injury. The Bengals went on to win the following week on the road over the Houston Texans by a score of 37–31 with Allen as quarterback. It was the first road win of Taylor's tenure with the Bengals (the team's first since 2018) and also the first winning streak of Taylor's head coaching career.

The Bengals finished with a 4–11–1 record, marking the third straight season the Bengals finished fourth in the AFC North. The following day, Bengals owner Mike Brown confirmed that Taylor would return as head coach for the 2021 season.

==== 2021 season ====
Taylor began his third season with a healthy Joe Burrow under center, having recovered from his knee injury the previous year. Facing the Minnesota Vikings in Week 1, the Bengals won on a last second field goal in overtime by rookie kicker Evan McPherson. Facing the 3–1 Green Bay Packers at home in Week 5, Taylor and his Bengals scored a game-tying touchdown with 3:27 to play at 22–22. Packers kicker Mason Crosby missed three field goals in a four-minute span, including a go-ahead 36-yarder with 2:12 to play, a 51-yard game-winner as time expired, and a 40-yard game-winner as Burrow threw an interception on the first play of overtime. McPherson missed two tries as well, including a 57-yarder with 0:26 to play in regulation, and a 49-yarder in overtime after Crosby's third miss. The Packers drove down the field one last time and Crosby scored on a 49-yard try with 1:55 left in overtime to drop the Bengals to 3–2. During Week 16 against the Baltimore Ravens, the Bengals won 41–21, giving them their first winning season since 2015. The following week, Taylor helped secure the Bengals' first AFC North division title since 2015 when they defeated the Kansas City Chiefs.

The Bengals finished the season with a 10–7 record and qualified for the playoffs. Taylor then led the team to their first playoff win since the 1990 season after they beat the Las Vegas Raiders 26–19 in the Wild Card Round. In the Divisional Round, the Bengals beat the top-seeded Tennessee Titans 19–16 for their first road playoff win in franchise history and advanced to their first AFC Championship Game since 1988. In the AFC Championship, the Bengals defeated the Kansas City Chiefs 27–24 on the road in overtime to reach their first Super Bowl since Super Bowl XXIII. In Super Bowl LVI, the Bengals lost 23–20 to the Los Angeles Rams. Following the conclusion of the season, Taylor signed a contract extension through 2026. While the details were not disclosed, prior to the extension, Taylor's $3.5 million annual salary was the lowest amongst the 32 head coaches in the NFL.

==== 2022 season ====
Taylor's fourth season got off to a rough start as the Bengals started 0–2, but they quickly turned things around and finished atop the AFC North with a 12–4 record. The Bengals did not play 17 games in 2022 due to the Damar Hamlin incident in Week 17; Taylor earned praise for his opposition to resuming the game.

The Bengals won the AFC North again, marking the first time in franchise history that the team earned division titles in back-to-back seasons. The Bengals defeated the Baltimore Ravens 24–17 in an AFC Wild Card Round played at home, then won an AFC Divisional Round playoff game on the road for the second consecutive season with a 27–10 victory over the Buffalo Bills. The victory over Buffalo gave Taylor as many postseason victories (five) as all former Bengals head coaches have combined. Cincinnati lost the rematch with the Kansas City Chiefs in the AFC Championship Game at Arrowhead Stadium by a score of 23–20, ending a 10-game winning streak by the Bengals.

==== 2023 season ====
Taylor led the Bengals to a 9–8 record in the 2023 season. The team finished fourth in the AFC North and missed the playoffs.

==== 2024 season ====
Taylor led the Bengals to another 9–8 record in 2024. The team finished third in the AFC North but missed the playoffs for the second consecutive season.

==== 2025 season ====
In the 2025 season, Taylor led the Bengals to a 6–11 record and a third place finish in the AFC North, which missed the postseason.

== Head coaching record ==
Team		Regular season					Postseason			
Team	Year	Won	Lost	Ties	Win %	Finish	Won	Lost	Win %	Result
CIN	2019	2	14	0	.125	4th in AFC North	—	—	—	—
CIN	2020	4	11	1	.281	4th in AFC North	—	—	—	—
CIN	2021	10	7	0	.588	1st in AFC North	3	1	.750	Lost to Los Angeles Rams in Super Bowl LVI
CIN	2022	12	4	0	.750	1st in AFC North	2	1	.667	Lost to Kansas City Chiefs in AFC Championship Game
CIN	2023	9	8	0	.529	4th in AFC North	—	—	—	—
CIN	2024	9	8	0	.529	3rd in AFC North	—	—	—	—
CIN	2025	6	11	0	.353	3rd in AFC North	—	—	—	—
CIN	2026	7	2	0	.778	TBD in AFC North	—	—	—	—
Total		59	65	1	.476		5	2	.714	

== Coaching tree ==
NFL head coaches under whom Taylor has served::

- Mike Sherman, Texas A&M Aggies (2008–2011)
- Joe Philbin, Miami Dolphins (2012–2015)
- Tommy Tuberville, Cincinnati (2016)
- Sean McVay, Los Angeles Rams (2017–2018)

One of Taylor's assistants has been hired as a head coach in the NFL:

- Brian Callahan, Tennessee Titans (2024–2025)

== Personal life ==
In 2008, Taylor married Sarah Sherman, daughter of former Green Bay Packers' head coach Mike Sherman. They have four children: Brooks, Luke, Emma Claire, and Milly.

Taylor has three siblings, including Chicago Bears offensive coordinator Press Taylor. Their father, Sherwood, was a defensive back and captain for Oklahoma under head coach Barry Switzer from 1977 to 1979.
