= 2006 Kansas State Wildcats football team =

American college football season

2006 Kansas State Wildcats football

Texas Bowl, L 10–37 vs. Rutgers
- Conference: Big 12 Conference
- North
- Record: 7–6 (4–4 Big 12)
- Head coach: Ron Prince (1st season)
- Offensive coordinator: James Franklin (1st season)
- Offensive scheme: Spread
- Defensive coordinator: Raheem Morris (1st season)
- Base defense: 4–3
- Home stadium: Bill Snyder Family Football Stadium

2006 Big 12 Conference football standings
	Conf.			Overall
Team	W		L	W		L
North Division
Nebraska x	6	–	2	9	–	5
Missouri	4	–	4	8	–	5
Kansas State	4	–	4	7	–	6
Kansas	3	–	5	6	–	6
Colorado	2	–	6	2	–	10
Iowa State	1	–	7	4	–	8
South Division
No. 11 Oklahoma x$	7	–	1	11	–	3
No. 13 Texas	6	–	2	10	–	3
Texas A&M	5	–	3	9	–	4
Texas Tech	4	–	4	8	–	5
Oklahoma State	3	–	5	7	–	6
Baylor	3	–	5	4	–	8
Championship: Oklahoma 21, Nebraska 7
$ – BCS representative as conference champion; x – Division champion/co-champions; Rankings from AP Poll

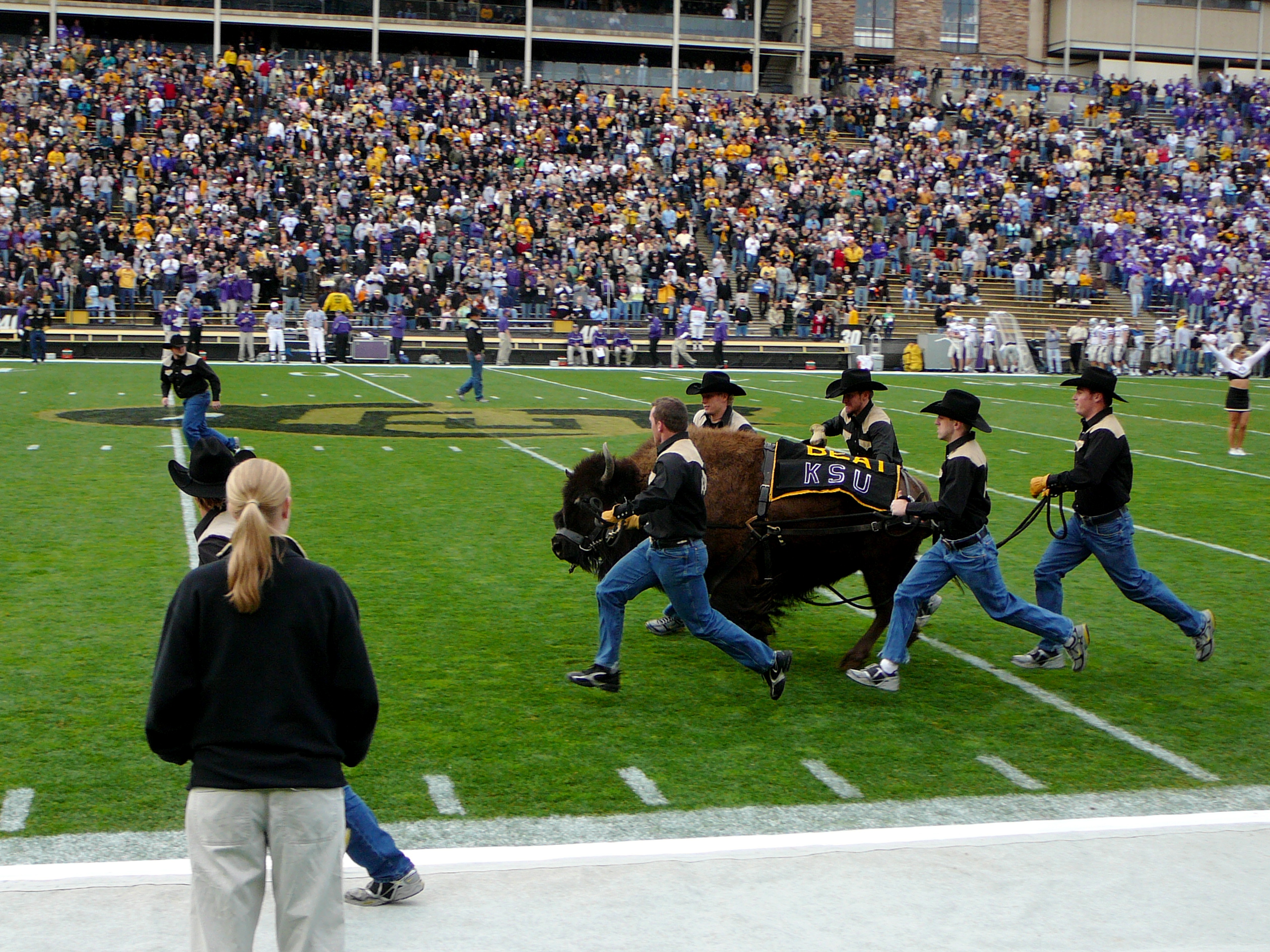
Ralphie running in the game against Kansas State Wildcats in which Colorado lost 34-21.

The 2006 Kansas State Wildcats football team represented Kansas State University in the 2006 NCAA Division I FBS football season. The team's head coach was Ron Prince, in his first year at K-State after leaving his offensive coordinator position at Virginia. Prince had no other head coaching experience prior to accepting the K-State job.

The Wildcats played their home games in Bill Snyder Family Stadium, which had previously been known as KSU Stadium but was renamed by the university's athletic department after Bill Snyder's first retirement following the 2005 season.

2006 saw the Wildcats finish with a record of 7–6, and a 4–4 record in Big 12 Conference play. The season ended with a loss to Rutgers in the Texas Bowl.

== Schedule ==
Date	Time	Opponent	Site	TV	Result	Attendance	Source
September 2	6:10 p.m.	No. 9 (FCS) Illinois State*	Bill Snyder Family Football Stadium; Manhattan, KS		W 24–23	47,250	
September 9	6:10 p.m.	Florida Atlantic*	Bill Snyder Family Football Stadium; Manhattan, KS		W 45–0	43,953	
September 16	11:40 a.m.	Marshall*	Bill Snyder Family Football Stadium; Manhattan, KS	FSN	W 23–7	46,488	
September 23	11:00 a.m.	No. 8 Louisville*	Bill Snyder Family Football Stadium; Manhattan, KS	FSN	L 6–24	45,855	
September 30	6:05 p.m.	at Baylor	Floyd Casey Stadium; Waco, TX		L 3–17	30,752	
October 7	2:35 p.m.	Oklahoma State	Bill Snyder Family Football Stadium; Manhattan, KS		W 31–27	46,616	
October 14	6:10 p.m.	No. 21 Nebraska	Bill Snyder Family Football Stadium; Manhattan, KS (rivalry)	FSN	L 3–21	50,723	
October 21	1:00 p.m.	at No. 24 Missouri	Faurot Field; Columbia, MO		L 21–41	64,657	
October 28	2:35 p.m.	Iowa State^{†}	Bill Snyder Family Football Stadium; Manhattan, KS (rivalry)		W 31–10	44,729	
November 4	2:30 p.m.	at Colorado	Folsom Field; Boulder, CO (rivalry)	FSN	W 34–21	42,696	
November 11	7:00 p.m.	No. 4 Texas	Bill Snyder Family Football Stadium; Manhattan, KS	ABC	W 45–42	47,933	
November 18	2:30 p.m.	at Kansas	Memorial Stadium; Lawrence, KS (rivalry)	FSN	L 20–39	51,821	
December 28	7:00 p.m.	vs. No. 16 Rutgers*	Reliant Stadium; Houston, TX (Texas Bowl)	NFLN	L 10–37	52,210	
*Non-conference game; ^{†}Homecoming; Rankings from AP Poll released prior to the game; All times are in Central time

== Game summaries ==
=== Illinois State ===
Illinois State would be the first opponent that new head coach Ron Prince would face. Illinois State, out of the Gateway Football Conference would prove to be a tough task for Kansas State as the Wildcats narrowly won, 24-23

Kansas State scored two special teams touchdowns and stopped Illinois State quarterback Luke Drone on a 2-point conversion in the final minutes to preserve a 24-23 victory in the head coaching debut of Ron Prince.

Trailing 17-16 with 8:25 to go, Kansas State's Marcus Perry popped the ball out of the arms of Illinois State's Jason Horton and into the hands of cornerback Byron Garvin, who sprinted 9 yards into the end zone to give the Wildcats the lead.

Dylan Meier hit tight end Rashaad Norwood for the 2-point conversion to make it 24-17, but the Redbirds came right back, just as they had all game.

Driving 47 yards in just over 5 minutes, Drone hit a wide open Pierre Jackson in the corner of the end zone to pull within 24-23 with 3:02 to go.

But instead of kicking the extra point, coach Denver Johnson elected to go for 2 and the win. Drone dropped back to pass but was quickly swallowed by the Kansas State defensive line to preserve the victory.

	1	2	3	4	Total
Illinois State	3	0	7	13	23
Kansas State	0	10	3	11	24

=== Florida Atlantic ===
The Wildcats were favored by 22 points going into the game.

Justin McKinney became the first Kansas State player in 70 years to run back an opening kickoff for a touchdown. McKinney sprinted to his right and went 88 yards down the sideline for Kansas State's first game-opening score since Red Elder's touchdown return in a 6-6 tie at Oklahoma on Nov. 7, 1936.

Dylan Meier threw for 125 yards and two touchdowns for the Wildcats (2-0), who extended their winning streak against Sun Belt teams to 10 straight games. It was the first shutout for Kansas State since a 45-0 win over Iowa State on Nov. 8, 2003.

After managing just 207 yards of offense in its first game, Kansas State rolled up 346 yards on the Owls (0-2). The Wildcats' defense, meanwhile, had three sacks and nine other tackles for loss, holding Florida Atlantic to 202 yards.

	1	2	3	4	Total
Florida Atlantic	0	0	0	0	0
Kansas State	14	10	7	14	45

=== Marshall ===
The Wildcats were favored by 10½ points going into the game.

Kansas State's defense dominated for the second straight game and forced three turnovers, and the Wildcats' offense found its groove late in a 23-7 victory over Marshall.

Kansas State outgained the Thundering Herd 355 yards to 142, but didn't mount a sustained TD drive until late in the fourth quarter.

	1	2	3	4	Total
Marshall	0	7	0	0	7
Kansas State	7	3	6	7	23

=== Louisville ===
The Cardinals were favored by 14 points going into the game.

Kansas State's defense stood tall and Thomas Clayton rushed for 119 yards and a touchdown, but No. 8 Louisville proved to be too much as the Cardinals handed the Wildcats their first setback of the season, 24-6.

The Wildcats held the nation's top scoring offense to less than half its average and its fewest points in nearly a year. But K-State had a tough time cashing in on opportunities, coming away without any points on three drives that ended inside the Louisville 30-yard line.

In the end, Kansas State held the high-octane Cardinal offense to their fewest passing yards in 15 games, but it wasn’t enough to derail Louisville.

Hunter Cantwell threw for 173 yards, including a 19-yard touchdown to Harry Douglas to cap a 97-yard drive on Louisville's opening possession of the game.

The K-State defense settled in and held the Cardinals to just 87 yards the rest of the half as Louisville took a 10-0 lead into the locker room, thanks to a 25-yard Art Carmody field goal with 4:17 to go in the second quarter.

The Wildcats were unable to dent the scoreboard until early in the fourth quarter, when Clayton ripped off a 69-yard run for K-State's only points of the game.

After George Stripling's 1-yard run put the Cardinals on top 17-0 in the third quarter, Louisville turned the ball over on two fumbles and an interception.

	1	2	3	4	Total
# 8 Louisville	7	3	7	7	24
Kansas State	0	0	0	6	6

=== Baylor ===
The Bears were favored by 2½ going into the game.

Kansas State won the battle of the stat sheet but was unable to turn yards into points as the Wildcats dropped a 17-3 decision at Baylor to open Big 12 play at Floyd Casey Stadium.

Josh Freeman threw for 196 yards in relief of starter Dylan Meier, including a 68-yard pass to Yamon Figurs and a 55-yard hook-up with Jermaine Moriera, but five turnovers, including three in the red zone helped keep the Wildcats off the scoreboard.

Baylor, meanwhile, used three big plays to generate all of its points as the Bears held on for just their second win of the season.

	1	2	3	4	Total
Kansas State	0	3	0	0	3
Baylor	7	0	10	0	17

=== Oklahoma State ===
Freshman quarterback Josh Freeman got rolling late in his first start, running for a 21-yard touchdown with 1:11 left to help Kansas State rally for a 31-27 victory over Oklahoma State on Saturday.

Leon Patton, another freshman making his first start for the Wildcats, ran for 151 yards and one touchdown and returned a kickoff 95 yards for another score.

Safety Marcus Watts also had a huge game for the Wildcats (4-2, 1-1 Big 12), who trailed 27-17 with just over three minutes left before coming back to beat the Cowboys (3-2, 0-1) for the sixth straight time in Manhattan and the 10th time in their last 11 meetings.

Watts blocked a punt that Daniel Gonzalez returned 21 yards for Kansas State's first score. In the closing seconds, Watts broke up what would have been a game-winning catch by D'Juan Woods then intercepted Bobby Reid's tipped pass in the end zone as time ran out.

Freeman, the first freshman to start for the Wildcats since Duane Howard in 1976, was sacked four times and had just six passing attempts going into the fourth quarter. But in the last four minutes, he was spectacular. His 43-yard completion to Jermaine Moreira set up Patton's 1-yard TD run with 3:04 left. That score, which broke a seven-quarter stretch without an offensive touchdown, got the Wildcats within 27-24. Oklahoma State couldn't muster a clock-killing drive in response, and Freeman needed only three plays to give Kansas State the lead.

He threw to Gonzalez for 20 yards and Yamon Figurs for 17, then went the rest of the way on his own after his protection broke down and the middle of the field opened up. He finished the day 10-for-15 for 177 yards and did not throw an interception.

	1	2	3	4	Total
Oklahoma State	0	3	17	7	27
Kansas State	0	10	7	14	31

=== Nebraska ===
The Cornhuskers were favored by 11 going into the game.

Nebraska gambled and won on a pair of tricky fourth-down calls, beating Kansas State 21-3 snapping the 21st-ranked Cornhuskers' four-game losing streak in Manhattan.

Kansas State (4-3, 1-2) had not lost at home to Nebraska since a 39-3 defeat on Oct. 5, 1996.

The Huskers (6-1, 3-0 Big 12) earned the program's 800th victory.

Nebraska's first touchdown, a 17-yard pass play less than four minutes into the game, came on a fake field goal. Holder Jake Wesch, a backup kicker who played quarterback in high school, rolled right and found reserve tight end Hunter Teafatiller all alone just outside the end zone for a 7-0 lead.

And on the Cornhuskers' first drive of the second quarter, Zac Taylor's 24-yard bootleg on fourth-and-2 from Kansas State's 27 set up a 3-yard TD pass to Josh Mueller—also a backup tight end—for a 14-0 lead.

Marlon Lucky's 40-yard TD burst up the middle made it 21-0 shortly before the midpoint of the third quarter.

Jeff Snodgrass' 53-yard field goal in the third quarter kept Kansas State from being shut out for the first time since a 12-0 loss at Colorado on Nov. 16, 1996.

	1	2	3	4	Total
#21 Nebraska	7	7	7	0	21
Kansas State	0	0	3	0	3

=== Missouri ===
The Tigers were favored by 16½ points going into the game. Missouri fell behind on the first play Saturday before Chase Daniel threw four touchdown passes to lead the No. 24 Tigers to a 41-21 victory over Kansas State, breaking a 13-game losing streak to the Wildcats.

The game, played in a driving rain, marked Missouri's first win over Kansas State since a 27-14 victory in Columbia in 1992.

Kansas State seemed poised for the upset early. Defensive end Rob Jackson broke around left end on the first play from scrimmage at the Missouri 41 and blindsided Daniel, forcing a fumble that was scooped up by linebacker Zach Diles, who ran 43 yards for the score.

After a Jeff Wolfert 30-yard field goal for Missouri, the Wildcats had a chance to go up 14-3 early in the second quarter. But on fourth-and-goal from the 1, James Johnson was stopped for no gain.

Missouri then drove 99 yards in 10 plays, scoring on a 14-yard pass from Daniel to tight end Martin Rucker.

	1	2	3	4	Total
Kansas State	7	0	7	7	21
#24 Missouri	3	14	17	7	41

=== Iowa State ===
Kansas State was favored by 5 points going into the game.

James Johnson had 115 yards rushing and scored the go-ahead touchdown on a 32-yard run late in the third quarter, as Kansas State scored 31 straight points to beat Iowa State 31-10 on Saturday.

Linebacker Brandon Archer recovered a muffed punt and a fumble for Kansas State which broke a two-game losing streak. The Cyclones lost their fifth straight, had a two-game winning streak against the Wildcats snapped.

	1	2	3	4	Total
Iowa State	10	0	0	0	10
Kansas State	0	10	7	14	31

=== Colorado ===
The Buffaloes were favored by 4 points going into the game.

Josh Freeman was efficient in the passing game going 22-26 and throwing for 251 yards and two touchdowns. Freeman led the Wildcats to their first win in Boulder since the 2000 season. K-State lost the 2002 and 2004 games in Boulder.

	1	2	3	4	Total
Kansas State	0	17	0	17	34
Colorado	0	0	7	14	21

=== Texas ===
The Longhorns were favored by 17½ points going into the game.

Behind Josh Freeman's three-touchdown performance, Kansas State shocked No. 4 Texas. The game was broadcast regionally on ABC's Saturday Night Football until the conclusion of the simultaneous Wake Forest at Florida State game. Then the last minutes of this game were broadcast nationally on ABC. The fans stormed the field after the game and tried unsuccessfully for several minutes to tear down the goalpost on the north endzone. The Longhorns got within a field goal on Chris Ogbonnaya's 1-yard touchdown run with 1:36 to go. But Jordy Nelson recovered the ensuing onside kick and then caught a 6-yard pass for a first down that sealed the Wildcats' win.

Freeman threw for 269 yards and three scores and ran for another TD for Kansas State, which scored three touchdowns over a 3:06 span in the third quarter on its way to breaking a six-game losing streak against ranked opponents.

Texas' Colt McCoy got pinned under the pile on the first drive at the goal line and came up favoring his right shoulder after a crushing hit by Wildcat linebacker Brandon Archer. He left the game and never returned.

	1	2	3	4	Total
#4 Texas	7	7	14	14	42
Kansas State	7	14	21	3	45

=== Kansas ===
The Jayhawks were favored by 2 points going into the game.

Kansas State had a tough day on the gridiron, turning the ball over six times (all six were credited to Josh Freeman, including three fumbles and three interceptions). The six turnovers led to 30 of Kansas' 39 points.

The Wildcats closed out the regular season with a 7-5 overall mark, 4-4 in Big 12 play, for their best record since the 2003.

Josh Freeman, the freshman sensation who accounted for four touchdowns in the previous week's upset of Texas, was manhandled by a Kansas pass defense ranked 117th in the country.

It was the first time since 1917 that both teams came into this state rivalry on winning streaks of at least two games.

Kansas' attendance of 51,821 set a Memorial Stadium record.

	1	2	3	4	Total
Kansas State	3	7	3	7	20
Kansas	13	7	0	19	39

=== Rutgers ===
See 2006 Texas Bowl

Rutgers was favored by 7 points going into the game.

Kansas State hung with No. 16 Rutgers for 30 minutes, but the Scarlet Knights scored 20 unanswered points in the second half to hand the Wildcats a 37-10 loss in the inaugural Texas Bowl before 52,210 fans at Reliant Stadium. It was the Wildcats' first bowl game appearance since the 2004 Fiesta Bowl, also a loss.

Rutgers, which just missed out on a BCS Bowl berth, was as good as advertised and kept K-State off balance all night long.

Ray Rice, the Texas Bowl MVP, rushed for 170 yards and a touchdown and Tim Brown caught two TD passes, for the Scarlet Knights (11-2), who claimed their first bowl victory in 137 seasons of intercollegiate football.

The game was held at Reliant Stadium in Houston, Texas and was broadcast on the NFL Network. This matchup was the inaugural Texas Bowl. The game replaced the Houston Bowl.

	1	2	3	4	Total
Kansas State	0	10	0	0	10
Rutgers	14	3	14	6	37

== Roster ==
2006 Kansas State Wildcats football team roster
Players
Coaches
Offense

Pos.	#	Name	Class
QB	1	Josh Freeman	Fr
RB	5	Thomas Clayton	Sr
WR	16	Yamon Figurs	Sr
WR	27	Jordy Nelson	Jr

Defense

Pos.	#	Name	Class
DB	7	Joshua Moore	Fr
LB	52	Zac Diles	Sr
DE	95	Rob Jackson	Jr

Special teams

Pos.	#	Name	Class
LS	62	Jeff Mortimer	Sr

Head coach

- Ron Prince

Coordinators/assistant coaches

- Tim McCarty – Assistant Head Coach/Offensive line
- James Franklin – Offensive Coordinator/quarterbacks
- Tim Horton – Running backs
- Pat Washington – Wide receivers
- James Jones – Tight ends
- Raheem Morris – Defensive Coordinator/secondary
- Mo Latimore – Defensive line
- Matt Wallerstedt – Linebackers/recruiting coordinator
- Tim Tibesar – Special teams
- Ricky Rahne – Graduate Assistant–Offense
- Scott Frost – Graduate Assistant–Defense

Legend

- (C) Team captain
- (S) Suspended
- (I) Ineligible
- Injured
- Redshirt

== Statistics ==
=== Scores by quarter ===
	1	2	3	4	Total
Kansas State	38	94	64	100	296
Opponents	71	51	100	87	309
