= 2006 Oklahoma State Cowboys football team =

American college football season

2006 Oklahoma State Cowboys football

Independence Bowl champion

Independence Bowl, W 34–31 vs. Alabama
- Conference: Big 12 Conference
- South Division
- Record: 7–6 (3–5 Big 12)
- Head coach: Mike Gundy (2nd season)
- Offensive coordinator: Larry Fedora (2nd season)
- Offensive scheme: Spread
- Defensive coordinator: Vance Bedford (2nd season)
- Base defense: 4–3
- Home stadium: Boone Pickens Stadium

2006 Big 12 Conference football standings
	Conf.			Overall
Team	W		L	W		L
North Division
Nebraska x	6	–	2	9	–	5
Missouri	4	–	4	8	–	5
Kansas State	4	–	4	7	–	6
Kansas	3	–	5	6	–	6
Colorado	2	–	6	2	–	10
Iowa State	1	–	7	4	–	8
South Division
No. 11 Oklahoma x$	7	–	1	11	–	3
No. 13 Texas	6	–	2	10	–	3
Texas A&M	5	–	3	9	–	4
Texas Tech	4	–	4	8	–	5
Oklahoma State	3	–	5	7	–	6
Baylor	3	–	5	4	–	8
Championship: Oklahoma 21, Nebraska 7
$ – BCS representative as conference champion; x – Division champion/co-champions; Rankings from AP Poll

The 2006 Oklahoma State Cowboys football team represented Oklahoma State University during the 2006 NCAA Division I FBS football season. They participated as members of the Big 12 Conference in the South Division. They played their home games at Boone Pickens Stadium in Stillwater, Oklahoma. They were coached by head coach Mike Gundy.

== Schedule ==
Date	Time	Opponent	Site	TV	Result	Attendance
September 2	6:00 p.m.	Missouri State*	Boone Pickens Stadium; Stillwater, Oklahoma		W 52–10	41,393
September 9	6:00 p.m.	at Arkansas State*	War Memorial Stadium; Little Rock, Arkansas	ESPNU	W 35–7	23,816
September 16	6:00 p.m.	Florida Atlantic*	Boone Pickens Stadium; Stillwater, OK		W 48–8	42,970
September 23	8:00 p.m.	at Houston*	Robertson Stadium; Houston, Texas	CSTV	L 25–34	28,260
October 7	2:30 p.m.	at Kansas State	Bill Snyder Family Football Stadium; Manhattan, Kansas		L 27–31	46,616
October 14	1:00 p.m.	at Kansas	Memorial Stadium; Lawrence, Kansas		W 42–32	41,203
October 21	6:00 p.m.	No. 25 Texas A&M^{†}	Boone Pickens Stadium; Stillwater, OK	FSN	L 33–34 ^{OT}	43,006
October 28	2:30 p.m.	No. 20 Nebraska	Boone Pickens Stadium; Stillwater, Oklahoma	ABC	W 41–29	40,108
November 4	6:00 p.m.	at No. 4 Texas	Darrell K Royal–Texas Memorial Stadium; Austin, Texas	TBS	L 10–36	89,036
November 11	11:30 a.m.	Baylor	Boone Pickens Stadium; Stillwater, Oklahoma	FSN	W 66–24	35,430
November 18	1:00 p.m.	at Texas Tech	Jones SBC Stadium; Lubbock, Texas		L 24–30	45,457
November 25	1:30 p.m.	No. 13 Oklahoma	Boone Pickens Stadium; Stillwater, Oklahoma (Bedlam Game)	FSN	L 21–27	42,819
December 28	3:30 p.m.	vs. Alabama*	Independence Stadium; Shreveport, Louisiana (Independence Bowl)	ESPN	W 34–31	45,054
*Non-conference game; ^{†}Homecoming; Rankings from AP Poll released prior to the game; All times are in Central time

== Personnel ==
=== Coaching staff ===
- Head coach: Mike Gundy
- Assistants: Nelson Barnes, Vance Bedford (DC), Todd Bradford, Gunter Brewer, Joe DeForest, Larry Fedora (OC), Curtis Luper, Doug Meacham, Joe Wickline (OL)

== Awards ==
- Big 12 Newcomer of the Year: Adarius Bowman, WR
- Big 12 Defensive Freshman of the Year: Andre Sexton, S
- All Big 12 First Team: Adarius Bowman (WR), Corey Hilliard (OL)
- All Big 12 Second Team: Victor DeGrate (DL), Matt Fodge (P)
