= 2006 Texas Tech Red Raiders football team =

American college football season

2006 Texas Tech Red Raiders football

Insight Bowl champion

Insight Bowl, W 44–41^{OT} vs. Minnesota
- Conference: Big 12 Conference
- South Division
- Record: 8–5 (4–4 Big 12)
- Head coach: Mike Leach (7th season)
- Co-offensive coordinators: Sonny Dykes (2nd season); Dana Holgorsen (2nd season)
- Offensive scheme: Air raid
- Defensive coordinator: Lyle Setencich (4th season)
- Base defense: 3–4
- Home stadium: Jones AT&T Stadium

2006 Big 12 Conference football standings
	Conf.			Overall
Team	W		L	W		L
North Division
Nebraska x	6	–	2	9	–	5
Missouri	4	–	4	8	–	5
Kansas State	4	–	4	7	–	6
Kansas	3	–	5	6	–	6
Colorado	2	–	6	2	–	10
Iowa State	1	–	7	4	–	8
South Division
No. 11 Oklahoma x$	7	–	1	11	–	3
No. 13 Texas	6	–	2	10	–	3
Texas A&M	5	–	3	9	–	4
Texas Tech	4	–	4	8	–	5
Oklahoma State	3	–	5	7	–	6
Baylor	3	–	5	4	–	8
Championship: Oklahoma 21, Nebraska 7
$ – BCS representative as conference champion; x – Division champion/co-champions; Rankings from AP Poll

The 2006 Texas Tech Red Raiders football team represented Texas Tech University as a member of the Big 12 Conference during the 2006 NCAA Division I FBS football season. Led by seventh-year head coach Mike Leach, the Red Raiders compiled an overall record of 8–5 with a mark of 4–4 in conference play, placing fourth in the Big 12's South Division. Texas Tech was invited to the Insight Bowl, where they defeated Minnesota in overtime. The Red Raiders played their home games at Jones SBC Stadium in Lubbock, Texas.

== Schedule ==
Date	Time	Opponent	Rank	Site	TV	Result	Attendance
September 3	6:00 pm	SMU*	No. 25	Jones AT&T Stadium; Lubbock, TX		W 35–3	50,362
September 9	8:00 pm	at UTEP*	No. 24	Sun Bowl; El Paso, TX	CSTV	W 38–35 ^{OT}	51,827
September 16	4:30 pm	at No. 20 TCU*	No. 24	Amon G. Carter Stadium; Fort Worth, TX (rivalry)	OLN	L 3–12	45,647
September 23	6:00 pm	Southeastern Louisiana*		Jones AT&T Stadium; Lubbock, TX		W 62–0	52,913
September 30	2:30 pm	at Texas A&M		Kyle Field; College Station, TX (rivalry)	ABC	W 31–27	85,979
October 7	6:00 pm	No. 23 Missouri^{†}		Jones AT&T Stadium; Lubbock, TX	TBS	L 21–38	49,050
October 14	2:30 pm	at Colorado		Folsom Field; Boulder, CO		L 6–30	50,233
October 21	2:30 pm	at Iowa State		Jack Trice Stadium; Ames, IA		W 42–26	44,112
October 28	6:00 pm	No. 5 Texas		Jones AT&T Stadium; Lubbock, TX (rivalry)	TBS	L 31–35	56,158
November 4	11:00 am	Baylor		Jones SBC Stadium; Lubbock, TX (rivalry)	FSN	W 55–21	51,303
November 11	6:00 pm	at No. 17 Oklahoma		Gaylord Family Oklahoma Memorial Stadium; Norman, OK	FSN	L 24–34	85,313
November 18	1:00 pm	Oklahoma State		Jones AT&T Stadium; Lubbock, TX		W 30–24	45,457
December 29	7:00 pm	vs. Minnesota*		Sun Devil Stadium; Tempe, AZ (Insight Bowl)	NFLN	W 44–41 ^{OT}	48,391
*Non-conference game; ^{†}Homecoming; Rankings from AP Poll released prior to the game; All times are in Central time

== Rankings ==
Ranking movements Legend: ██ Increase in ranking ██ Decrease in ranking — = Not ranked RV = Received votes
	Week															
Poll	Pre	1	2	3	4	5	6	7	8	9	10	11	12	13	14	Final
AP	25	24	24	RV	RV	RV	RV	—	—	—	—	—	—	—	—	—
Coaches	25	24	22	RV	24	24	RV	—	—	—	—	—	—	—	—	—
Harris	Not released				—	—	—	—	—	—	—	—	—	—	—	Not released
BCS	Not released							—	—	—	—	—	—	—	—	Not released

== Game summaries ==
=== Baylor ===
Team	1	2	3	4	Total
Baylor	7	7	7	0	21
• Texas Tech	7	21	14	13	55

- Date: November 4
- Location: Jones AT&T Stadium, Lubbock, Texas
- Game start: 11:05 a.m. CST
- Game attendance: 51,303
- TV announcers (FSN): Bill Land (Play-by-play), Gary Reasons (Color), & Emily Jones (Sideline)
- Source: ESPN

Scoring summary
1	11:45	TTU	Edward Britton 20-yard pass from Graham Harrell (Alex Trlica kick)	TTU 7–0
1	4:24	BAY	Trent Shelton 56-yard pass from Blake Szymanski (Ryan Havens kick)	Tied 7–7
2	12:02	BAY	Blake Szymanski 3-yard run (Ryan Havens kick)	BAY 14–7
2	7:46	TTU	Shannon Woods 34-yard run (Alex Trlica kick)	Tied 14–14
2	4:14	TTU	Joel Filani 4-yard pass from Graham Harrell (Alex Trlica kick)	TTU 21–14
2	0:31	TTU	Joel Filani 31-yard pass from Graham Harrell (Alex Trlica kick)	TTU 28–14
3	11:43	TTU	Joel Filani 76-yard pass from Graham Harrell (Alex Trlica kick)	TTU 35–14
3	7:04	TTU	Shannon Woods 1-yard run (Alex Trlica kick)	TTU 42–14
3	2:38	BAY	Blake Szymanski 3-yard run (Ryan Havens kick)	TTU 42–21
4	14:10	TTU	Alex Trlica 37-yard field goal	TTU 45–21
4	9:19	TTU	Shannon Woods 6-yard run (Alex Trlica kick)	TTU 52–21
4	4:25	TTU	Alex Trlica 37-yard field goal	TTU 55–21

Statistics	BAY	TTU
First downs	16	32
Total yards	217	682
Rushing yards	29	175
Passing yards	197	507
Passing: comp–att–int	16–30–1	38–58–1
Turnovers	3	1

Team	Category	Player	Statistics
Baylor	Passing	Blake Szymanski	16/30, 197 yards, TD, INT
Baylor	Rushing	Blake Szymanski	22 rushes, 25 yards, 2 TD
Baylor	Receiving	Trent Shelton	2 receptions, 62 yards, TD
Texas Tech	Passing	Graham Harrell	35/52, 483 yards, 4 TD, INT
Texas Tech	Rushing	Shannon Woods	10 rushes, 125 yards, 3 TD
Texas Tech	Receiving	Joel Filani	8 receptions, 212 yards, 3 TD

== Roster ==
2006 Texas Tech Red Raiders football team roster
Players
Coaches
Offense

Pos.	#	Name	Class
QB	6	Graham Harrell	So
WR	88	Jarrett Hicks	Sr

Defense

Pos.	#	Name	Class

Special teams

Pos.	#	Name	Class
K	30	Alex Trlica	Jr

Head coach

- Mike Leach

Coordinators/assistant coaches

Legend

- (C) Team captain
- (S) Suspended
- (I) Ineligible
- Injured
- Redshirt
