= 2006 Texas A&M Aggies football team =

American college football season

2006 Texas A&M Aggies football

Holiday Bowl, L 10–45 vs. California
- Conference: Big 12 Conference
- South Division
- Record: 9–4 (5–3 Big 12)
- Head coach: Dennis Franchione (4th season)
- Offensive coordinator: Les Koenning (4th season)
- Offensive scheme: Multiple
- Defensive coordinator: Gary Darnell (1st season)
- Base defense: 4–2–5
- Home stadium: Kyle Field

2006 Big 12 Conference football standings
	Conf.			Overall
Team	W		L	W		L
North Division
Nebraska x	6	–	2	9	–	5
Missouri	4	–	4	8	–	5
Kansas State	4	–	4	7	–	6
Kansas	3	–	5	6	–	6
Colorado	2	–	6	2	–	10
Iowa State	1	–	7	4	–	8
South Division
No. 11 Oklahoma x$	7	–	1	11	–	3
No. 13 Texas	6	–	2	10	–	3
Texas A&M	5	–	3	9	–	4
Texas Tech	4	–	4	8	–	5
Oklahoma State	3	–	5	7	–	6
Baylor	3	–	5	4	–	8
Championship: Oklahoma 21, Nebraska 7
$ – BCS representative as conference champion; x – Division champion/co-champions; Rankings from AP Poll

The 2006 Texas A&M Aggies football team completed the season with a 9–4 record. The Aggies had a regular season Big 12 record of 5–3.

== Schedule ==
Date	Time	Opponent	Rank	Site	TV	Result	Attendance
September 2	6:00 p.m.	The Citadel*		Kyle Field; College Station, TX		W 35–3	70,104
September 9	6:00 p.m.	Louisiana–Lafayette*		Kyle Field; College Station, TX		W 51–7	67,079
September 16	8:15 p.m.	vs. Army*		Alamodome; San Antonio, TX	ESPN2	W 28–24	64,583
September 23	8:00 p.m.	Louisiana Tech*		Kyle Field; College Station, TX		W 45–14	68,563
September 30	2:30 p.m.	No. 24 Texas Tech		Kyle Field; College Station, TX (rivalry)	ABC	L 27–31	85,979
October 7	11:00 a.m.	at Kansas		Memorial Stadium; Lawrence, KS	FSN	W 21–18	46,445
October 14	2:30 p.m.	No. 19 Missouri		Kyle Field; College Station, TX	ABC	W 25–19	71,136
October 21	6:00 p.m.	at Oklahoma State	No. 23	Boone Pickens Stadium; Stillwater, OK		W 34–33 ^{OT}	43,006
October 28	6:00 p.m.	at Baylor	No. 22	Floyd Casey Stadium; Waco, TX		W 31–21	51,385
November 4	7:00 p.m.	No. 18 Oklahoma	No. 21	Kyle Field; College Station, TX (College GameDay)	ABC	L 16–17	85,697
November 11	2:30 p.m.	Nebraska	No. 24	Kyle Field; College Station, TX	ABC	L 27–28	83,336
November 24	11:00 a.m.	at No. 11 Texas		Darrell K Royal–Texas Memorial Stadium; Austin, TX (rivalry)	ABC	W 12–7	89,102
December 28	12:00 p.m.	vs. No. 20 California*	No. 21	Qualcomm Stadium; San Diego, CA (Holiday Bowl)	ESPN	L 10–45	62,395
*Non-conference game; Rankings from AP Poll released prior to the game; All times are in Central time

== Roster ==
Number	Name	Position	Height	Weight	DOB	Year	High School
24	Chris Alexander	RB	5–11	242	November 26, 1984	JR*	Humble, TX (Humble HS)
8	Matthew Almaraz	DB	5–10	194		SO*	San Antonio, TX (Jay HS)
41	David Anderson	RB	5–9	188		SR*	Plano, TX (Plano HS)
35	Jeremy Axel	LB	6–0	220		JR	Sugar Land, TX (Hightower HS)
71	Yemi Babalola	OL	6–4	298	March 24, 1986	SO*	Bryan, TX (Bryan HS)
1	Jonathan Batson	DB	6–1	190		JR	Converse, TX (Judson HS)
27	Richie Bean	K	6–0	180	June 24, 1986	SO*	Marrero, LA (Ehret, John, HS)
13	Martellus Bennett	TE	6–7	248	March 10, 1987	SO	Houston, TX (Taylor HS)
11	Michael Bennett	DL	6–4	263	November 13, 1985	SO	Houston, TX (Taylor HS)
88	Cody Beyer	WR	6–1	180	August 31, 1987	FR	Spring Branch, TX (Smithson Valley HS)
3	Ben Bitner	DB	5–5	166	October 3, 1984	JR	Round Rock, TX (Round Rock HS)
39	Greg Boothe	RB	6–2	225	September 9, 1984	SR	La Grange, TX (La Grange HS)
16	Justin Brantly	P	6-3	228	March 28, 1986	SO	Sealy, TX (Sealy HS)
19	Ty Branyon	QB	6–3	213	September 17, 1983	SR*	Austin, TX (Bowie HS)
18	Arkeith Brown	DB	5–11	170	May 1, 1986	SO	El Campo, TX (El Campo HS)
28	Japhus Brown	DB	5–11	199	June 4, 1985	JR*	Edna, TX (Edna HS)
85	Jeremy Brown	WR	6–2	205	September 29, 1986	FR*	Fort Worth, TX (Southwest HS)
15	Kenny Brown	WR	6–2	194		FR	Oklahoma City, OK (Putnam City North HS)
6	Pierre Brown	WR	6–2	200	January 10, 1986	SO*	Duncanville, TX (Duncanville HS)
89	Kevin Bryan	OL	6–3	268	November 9, 1985	SO*	Lufkin, TX (Lufkin HS)
85	Red Bryant	DL	6–5	324	April 18, 1984	JR*	Jasper, TX (Jasper HS)
30	Chevar Bryson	DB	6–0	185	September 4, 1986	FR*	Midland, TX (Lee HS)
33	Melvin Bullitt	DB	6–1	201	November 13, 1984	SR	Garland, TX (Naaman Forest HS)
87	Christian Caflisch	WR	6–2	182		FR	San Antonio, TX (Madison HS)
80	Lorenzo Calloway	WR	5–9	171		SO*	Houston, TX (Smiley HS)
40	Jarret Cantu	LB	6–2	230		FR*	Mission, TX (Sharyland HS)
13	Marquis Carpenter	DB	6–0	179		JR	Melbourne, FL (Palm Bay Senior HS)
69	Evan Carson	DL	5–11	221		FR*	Allen, TX (Allen HS)
49	Anthony Carter	WR	6–0	196		SO*	Jacksboro, TX (Jacksboro HS)
54	Corey Clark	OL	6–6	317	June 21, 1984	JR*	Spring Branch, TX (Smithson Valley HS)
22	Latrael Cooper	RB	6–0	217		FR	Cuero, TX (Cuero HS)
20	Michael Corey	WR	6–4	209	June 18, 1983	JR*	Delta, UT (Delta HS)
38	Chris Curiel	DB	6–0	196		SR	San Antonio, TX (Reagan HS)
47	Cory Davis	LS	6–1	247		SO*	Conroe, TX (Conroe HS)
77	Grant Dickey	OL	6–5	315	April 13, 1984	SR*	Tyler, TX (Lee HS)
9	Alton Dixon	DB	5–11	200	February 1, 1987	SO	Lufkin, TX (Lufkin HS)
50	Mark Dodge	LB	6–2	222	December 31, 1980	JR	Yerington, NV (Yerington HS)
53	Derrick Dumas	LB	6–1	220		FR*	Crawford, TX (Crawford HS)
64	Kirk Elder	OL	6–5	298	November 21, 1984	JR*	Spring, TX (Klein Oak HS)
45	Rawley Farrell	DB	6–0	193	June 14, 1985	JR	East Bernard, TX (East Bernard HS)
46	Matthew Featherston	LB	6–3	240	January 7, 1987	FR*	Poughkeepsie, NY (Poughkeepsie HS)
73	Price Ferguson	OL	6–2	285		FR	Katy, TX (Cinco Ranch HS)
44	Pierre Fleurinor	DB	6–0	200		FR	Wharton, TX (Wharton HS)
8	Kerry Franks	WR	5–11.5	196	August 16, 1985	JR	Orange, TX (West Orange-Stark HS)
93	Paul Freeney	DL	6–3	252	January 14, 1987	FR*	Houston, TX (Eisenhower HS)
79	Robbie Frost	OL	6–6	308	June 12, 1987	FR*	Houston, TX (Stratford HS)
86	Amos Gbunblee	TE	6–5	250	October 3, 1985	SO*	Cypress, TX (Cypress Springs HS)
86	Eric George	WR	6–0	152		FR*	
52	Corey Gibas	S	6–1	217		FR	Covina, CA (Charter Oak HS)
67	Sam Giesselmann	LS	6–4	201		SO*	Arlington, TX (Arlington HS)
23	Brandt Goeke	WR	6–0	165		SO	Bellville, TX (Bellville HS)
34	Marcus Gold	DB	5–7	180	July 10, 1986	FR*	Irving, TX (Irving HS)
44	Weston Gooch	DB	6–0	197		FR*	
3	Michael Goodson	RB	6–0	192	May 23, 1987	FR	Klein, TX (Klein Collins HS)
4	Danny Gorrer	DB	6–0	178	June 1, 1986	SO*	Port Arthur, TX (Memorial HS)
26	Devin Gregg	DB	6–0	195	October 28, 1986	SO	Houston, TX (Westfield HS)
74	Lee Grimes	OL	6–6	310	January 28, 1987	FR*	Brownwood, TX (Brownwood HS)
17	Nathan Haile	LB	6–1	218	February 7, 1984	JR*	Friona, TX (Friona HS)
52	John Hamilton	LB	6–1	220		SO*	Temple, TX (Temple HS)
92	Chris Harrington	DL	6–5	267	January 19, 1985	JR*	Houston, TX (St. Pius X HS)
	Will Harris	DB				FR*	Lakewood, OH (Lakewood HS)
91	Kellen Heard	DL	6–6	330	October 17, 1985	FR*	Wharton, TX (Wharton HS)
19	Charles Hewitt	DB	6–0	210		FR*	Sugar Land, TX (Stephen F Austin HS)
29	Stephen Hodge	LB	6–1	225	January 7, 1985	JR*	Dallas, TX (Lake Highlands HS)
89	Jason Jack	DL	6–4	271	November 15, 1984	JR*	Humble, TX (Humble HS)
1	Jerrod Johnson	QB	6–6	223		FR	Humble, TX (Humble HS)
22	Jeff Karr	DB	5–10	195		SO	Richardson, TX (Pearce HS)
98	Andrew Key	TE	6–3	235	April 28, 1986	FR*	Addison, TX (Trinity Christian Academy)
24	Tyler Kociuba	DB	6–0	190		FR*	Liberty Hill, TX (Liberty Hill HS)
72	Alex Kotzur	OL	6–5	285	January 15, 1984	SR*	Houston, TX (St. Thomas HS)
15	Matthew LaFon	DB	5–10	194	January 22, 1984	SR	Magnolia, TX (Magnolia HS)
55	Nick LaMantia	LB	6–1	227	November 25, 1985	SO*	Mission, TX (Sharyland HS)
11	Jorvorskie Lane	RB	6–0	274	February 4, 1987	SO	Lufkin, TX (Lufkin HS)
21	David Latham	DB	6–2	200		SO*	Addison, TX (Trinity Christian Academy)
21	Brandon Leone	RB	6–1	218	September 11, 1984	SR*	Conroe, TX (Oak Ridge HS)
36	Anthony Lewis	LB	6–2	244		FR	Haltom City, TX (Haltom HS)
25	Courtney Lewis	RB	6–0	204	November 9, 1982	SR*	Houston, TX (Madison HS)
29	Daniel Mach	WR	5–11	198	January 14, 1986	SO*	Garland, TX (Naaman Forest HS)
42	Nurahda Manning	LB	6–3	250	August 29, 1983	SR*	Bay City, TX (Bay City HS)
63	Kevin Matthews	OL	6–4	300	February 4, 1987	FR*	Missouri City, TX (Lawrence E Elkins HS)
4	Jamie McCoy	QB	6–3	224	July 21, 1987	FR*	Midland, TX (Lee HS)
7	Stephen McGee	QB	6–3	208	September 27, 1985	SO*	Burnet, TX (Burnet HS)
34	Timothy McKay	LB	6–0	216		JR*	Texas City, TX (Texas City HS)
59	Mark Metzger	LB	6–3	234		SO	Harlingen, TX (Marine Military Academy)
5	Howard Morrow	WR	6–0	205	January 2, 1987	SO	Keller, TX (Fossil Ridge HS)
32	Layne Neumann	K	6–0	174	August 14, 1983	SR*	Hondo, TX (Hondo HS)
20	Broderick Newton	DB	5–11	183	July 22, 1985	JR*	Aledo, TX (Aledo HS)
49	Cyril Obiozor	DL	6–5	257	September 26, 1986	SO*	Pearland, TX (Pearland HS)
38	Ryan O'Bryant	RB	5–11	227		FR*	Houston, TX (Chester W Nimitz HS)
58	Alex Ott	OL	6–4	285	April 10, 1985	JR*	Albuquerque, NM (Eldorado HS)
65	Joseph Parrish	OL	6–0	244		SR	Kingwood, TX (Kingwood HS)
78	Lucas Patterson	OL	6–5	306		FR	Kingsville, TX (King HS)
68	Eric Pennington	OL	6–4	315		FR	Houston, TX (Jersey Village HS)
82	Antonio Perry	WR	6–2	171	January 11, 1986	FR*	Hammond, LA (Hammond HS)
27	Jordan Peterson	DB	5–10	186	August 18, 1987	FR*	Lexington, TX (Lexington HS)
33	Zachary Pietsch	WR	5–11	180		SO	Giddings, TX (Giddings HS)
53	J Pond	OL	6–5	317	January 25, 1984	SR*	Abilene, TX (Cooper HS)
25	Jordan Pugh	DB	5–11	190		FR	Plano, TX (Plano West Senior HS)
56	Matt Rankin	OL	6–2	255		FR	Kingwood, TX (Kingwood HS)
44	Jason Ray	TE	6–4	202	December 16, 1984	JR	McGregor, TX (McGregor HS)
90	Leslie Ray	DL	6–2	281		FR	Midland, TX (Lee HS)
35	Bryce Reed	DL	6–0	295	March 23, 1984	SR*	Dallas, TX (W W Samuell HS)
43	Jodie Richardson	LB	6–0	233	October 18, 1986	FR*	Duncanville, TX (Duncanville HS)
98	Dustin Riewe	LB	6–0	220		SO*	Elgin, TX (Elgin HS)
17	L'Tydrick Riley	WR	6–3	234	January 24, 1984	SR*	Crockett, TX (Crockett HS)
60	Josh Russell	OL	6–4	328	November 8, 1986	FR*	Midlothian, TX (Midlothian HS)
16	Husani Sallah	DB	5–8	174	December 2, 1986	FR*	Houston, TX (Worthing HS)
18	T.J. Sanders	QB	6–3	206	October 1, 1984	JR*	Goddard, KS (Goddard HS)
14	Travis Sawtelle	DB	6–0	177		FR*	San Antonio, TX (Alamo Heights HS)
75	Travis Schneider	OL	6–8	295	February 8, 1986	SO*	Bellville, TX (Bellville HS)
14	Chad Schroeder	WR	6–1	186	June 11, 1983	SR*	Austin, TX (Westlake HS)
9	E.J. Shankle	WR	5–11	177		FR	Lufkin, TX (Lufkin HS)
76	Michael Shumard	OL	6–5	305	October 14, 1986	FR*	Killeen, TX (Harker Heights HS)
84	Chris Smith	DL	6–5	270	July 26, 1985	SO*	Allen, TX (Allen HS)
95	Henry Smith	DL	6–3	318	June 19, 1983	JR*	Aliceville, AL (Aliceville HS)
26	Keondra Smith	RB	5–9	207		FR*	Tyler, TX (Lee HS)
47	Blake Steadman	LB	6–2	243		SR	Houston, TX (Memorial HS)
7	Matt Szymanski	K	6–1	188		FR	College Station, TX (A & M Consolidated HS)
2	Earvin Taylor	WR	6–3	244	January 30, 1985	JR*	Mission, TX (Mission HS)
32	Samson Taylor	RB	6–0	205	September 12, 1985	SO*	The Woodlands, TX (The Woodlands HS)
81	Joey Thomas	TE	6–5	247	December 24, 1984	JR*	Austin, TX (Westlake HS)
41	Demaurier Thompson	DB	6–1	175		FR	Dallas, TX (W.T. White HS)
94	Marques Thornton	DL	6–1	288	July 25, 1984	SR*	Houston, TX (Madison HS)
37	Misi Tupe	LB	5–10	250		JR	Ogden, UT (Bonneville HS)
91	Ryan Vaughan	TE	6–4	247		SO*	
70	Cody Wallace	OL	6–4	296	November 26, 1984	JR*	Cuero, TX (Cuero HS)
83	Terence Ward	WR	5–10	207		SO*	Wharton, TX (Wharton HS)
10	Justin Warren	LB	6–2.5	245	April 10, 1985	SR	Tyler, TX (Lee HS)
97	Cody Williams	DL	6–4	238		FR	Longview, TX (Longview HS)
80	Vincent Williams	DL	6–4	310		FR*	Dallas, TX (David W Carter HS)
84	Drew Williamson	WR	6–2	196		SO	
10	Jeff Wood	QB	6–5	210		FR*	
51	Chris Yoder	OL	6–3	318	October 22, 1984	JR*	Kingwood, TX (Kingwood HS)

== Game summaries ==
=== The Citadel ===
	1	2	3	4	Total
The Citadel	0	3	0	0	3
Texas A&M	14	7	7	7	35

=== Louisiana-Lafayette ===
	1	2	3	4	Total
Louisiana-Lafayette	0	7	0	0	7
Texas A&M	14	17	20	0	51

=== Army ===
	1	2	3	4	Total
Texas A&M	7	7	14	0	28
Army	7	7	7	3	24

=== Louisiana Tech ===
	1	2	3	4	Total
Louisiana Tech	7	0	0	7	14
'Texas A&M	0	14	21	10	45

=== Texas Tech ===
	1	2	3	4	Total
#24 Texas Tech	10	14	0	7	31
Texas A&M	7	7	3	10	27

The game was close throughout the first three quarters, with the most notable play being a 95-yard kickoff return by A&M's Kerry Franks. When Tech was trailing by 3 late in the game, Graham Harrell threw what appeared to be an interception that would ice the game for the Aggies. However, video replay showed that the ball skipped off the ground before Mark Dodge corralled it, so the play was overturned. Tech went on to take the lead with less than a minute left on the clock. This close loss would prove to be devastating to A&M, as they would have won the Big 12 South had Dodge's interception been allowed. Dennis Franchione fell to 1–3 against the rival Red Raiders.

=== Kansas ===
	1	2	3	4	Total
Texas A&M	0	7	0	14	21
Kansas	10	0	8	0	18

=== Missouri ===
	1	2	3	4	Total
#21 Missouri	7	10	2	0	19
Texas A&M	10	7	8	0	25

=== Oklahoma State ===
	1	2	3	4	OT	Total
#25 Texas A&M	3	7	3	14	7	34
Oklahoma State	6	0	14	7	6	33

=== Baylor ===
	1	2	3	4	Total
#22 Texas A&M	6	15	0	10	31
Baylor	7	7	7	0	21

=== Oklahoma ===
	1	2	3	4	Total
#18 Oklahoma	14	0	3	0	17
#21 Texas A&M	3	7	0	6	16

This game was Bob Stoops's 100th as head coach at Oklahoma; it was also the 25th meeting between the programs. The Sooners hold a narrow 15–10 lead in the series, though A&M has won five of the eight played in College Station. The Sooners have won their last four games while the Texas A&M Aggies came in with a four-game winning streak.

The two programs are very similar in their offensive philosophies. Texas A&M came in averaging a very balanced 213.7 yards per game rushing and 209.1 passing while the Sooners averaged 178.4 yards on the ground and 204.8 through the air. Oklahoma was surrendering an average of 36 fewer yards per game on defense.

The game started well for the Sooners. Allen Patrick had 101 yards on 14 carries and Oklahoma scored two touchdowns in the first quarter to A&M's one field goal. After Oklahoma failed to recover an early surprise onside kick, however, the Aggies closed the gap to 4 points with a scoring drive capped by a one-yard rumble from running back Jorvorskie Lane. The defenses stiffened in the second half and both teams had to settle for field goals in the third and fourth quarters. In his second risky call of the game, Stoops had the Sooners attempt to convert a fourth-and-inches with 1:29 left to play and the ball almost to the offense's 30 yard line. The run by Thompson was successful but unnecessary as A&M was penalized for having too many men on the field and Oklahoma was able to run out the clock.

Paul Thompson had a disappointing day as he completed only three of his twelve passing attempts for a total of 39 yards. A&M's Stephen McGee was slightly better completing 8 of 18 for 63 yards, though he was picked off by Marcus Walker in the third quarter; Garrett Hartley kicked a field goal after the Sooners offense could not advance the ball after the turnover. The Aggies forced two fumbles of their own (one from Patrick and one from Thompson), but they were forced to punt after their own offense was also stymied. The player of the game was Allen Patrick; he finished the day with a career-high 173 yards on 32 carries and one touchdown, however, he suffered a sprained ankle during the last minutes of the game. Coach Wilson questioned whether he will be 100% for the next game. Texas A&M coach Dennis Franchione is now 0–4 against the Sooners.

On the day of the game, ESPN's College GameDay broadcast from College Station.

=== Nebraska ===
	1	2	3	4	Total
#25 Nebraska	7	14	0	7	28
#23 Texas A&M	7	3	3	14	27

=== Texas ===
	1	2	3	4	Total
Texas A&M	6	0	0	6	12
#10 Texas	0	0	7	0	7

This game marked the 113th meeting between Texas and the Texas Aggies in college football and the game is part of a multi-sport rivalry called the Lone Star Showdown. It is the Longhorns' longest-running rivalry and Texas lead the series 73–34–5, including the last six in a row. During the week before the game, the Longhorns conducted their traditional Hex Rally while the Aggies had an off-campus version of their traditional Bonfire. and also staged a parade just prior to the game. The Longhorns announced that starting quarterback Colt McCoy, who was injured in the game against Kansas State, was cleared to play the game against the Aggies.

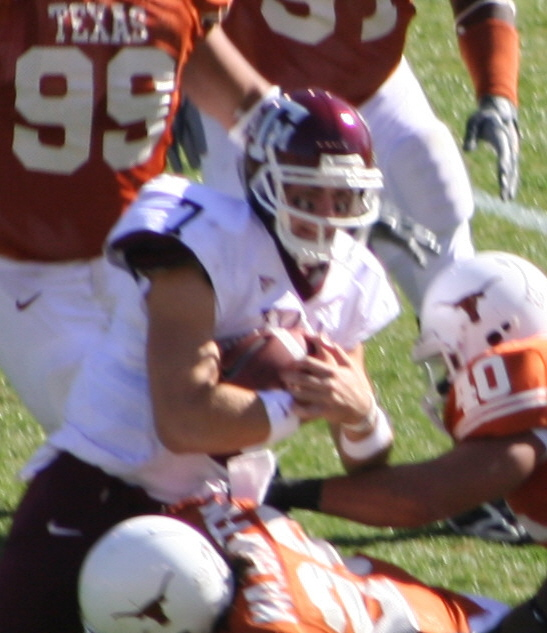
Texas tackles Stephen McGee.

Since the series began in 1894 it has traditionally played on Thanksgiving Day or Thanksgiving weekend. The 2006 game marked the thirteenth straight game to be scheduled the day after Thanksgiving. On Thanksgiving Day (one day prior to the game), the sports line in Vegas casinos had Texas favored by 13 to 13½ points while the weather forecast called for mostly sunny skies, a high near 81 °F (27 °C), and winds up to 15 miles per hour (24 km/h) from the South. The 2006 meeting was the first time in eight years that both teams entered the game with at least eight wins coming into the match-up. Going back to 1999 when UT lost the final three games of the season, the Longhorns had gone 87 games without losing back-to-back games. That was the longest active streak for any college or professional football team.

During 2006, the Texas A&M defensive coordinator was Gary Darnell who had been fired as defensive coordinator at the University of Texas under John Mackovic.

The pre-game activities consisted of a military flyby performed by AH-1 Cobra helicopters from the Marine Light Attack Helicopter Squadron HMLA-773 from Atlanta. Texas A&M won the coin toss and deferred, Texas elected to receive, and Texas A&M chose to defend the south end-zone. Kick-off was delayed while ABC side-line reporter Stacey Dales did her pre-game report from the north end-zone.

Texas's first drive of the game ended when Henry Melton was stopped on a fourth-and-one run at the Aggie eight-yard who was led with a big push by freshman Tony Portillo.(7 m) line. The Aggies drove the ball the length of the field to score a touchdown, but missed on the extra point to leave the game at 6–0.

With about four minutes to play in the first half, McCoy connected with Limas Sweed for an apparent five-yard (5 m) touchdown pass. However, Sweed was flagged for a "questionable" pass interference call. According to the Austin American-Statesman the referee blew the call as replays showed that both players were involved in some "hand checking while the ball was in the air, but neither player appeared to push or be guilty of interference". All three broadcasters working the game for ABC also spoke out against the penalty call. In an ABC half-time interview, Mack Brown said “I thought it was a bad call,” but added “There’s nothing we can do about that. We should’ve done a better job on third down.”

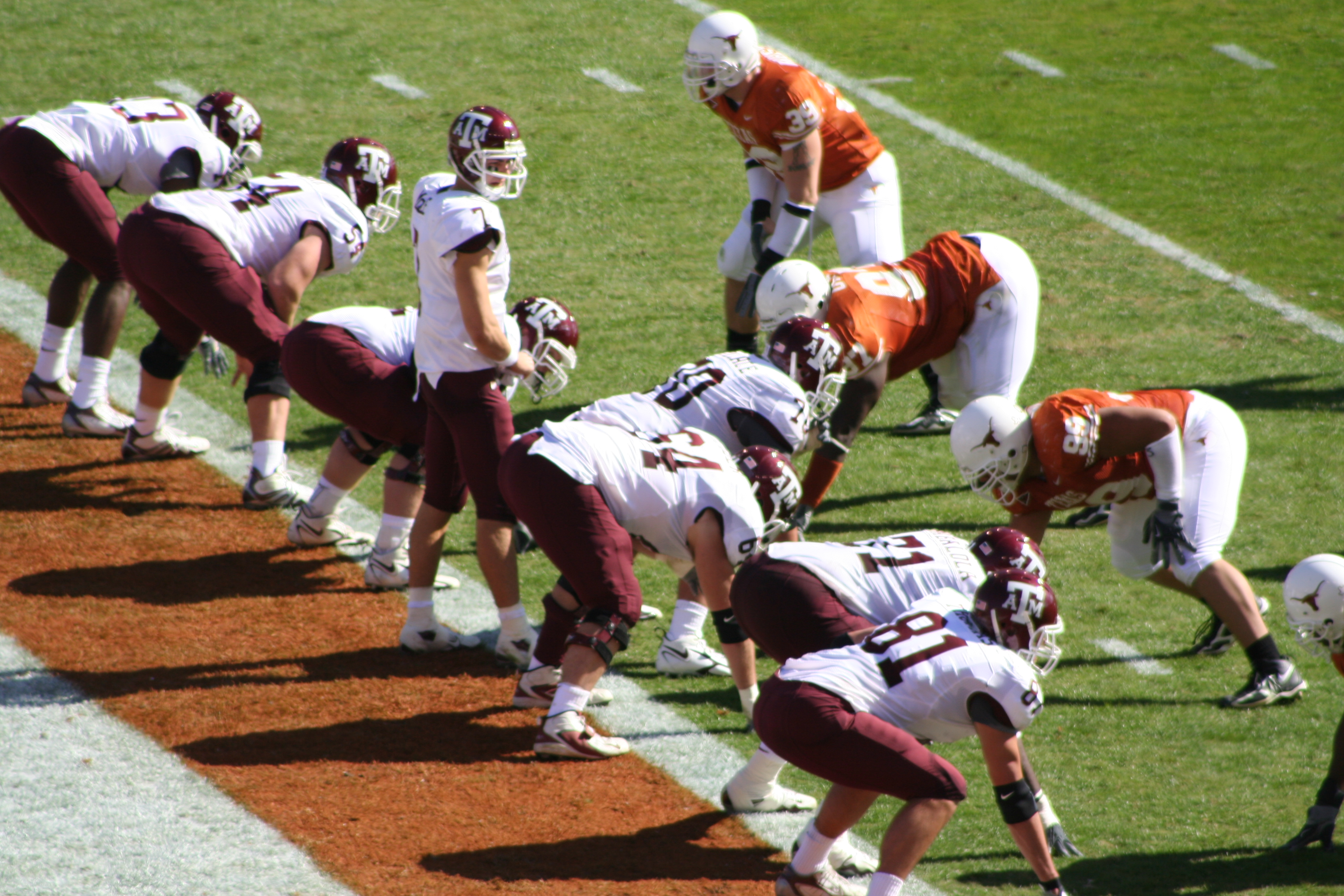
Texas A&M takes over at their goal line after a Colt McCoy interception in the first half

Immediately after the penalty, Colt McCoy threw an interception near the Texas A&M goal line and the Aggies were able to run out the clock to take the 6–0 lead into half-time. The zero score marked the first time the Longhorns had been held scoreless in the first half of play since the 2004 season.

The only score in the third quarter was a rushing touchdown by Jamaal Charles, his seventh of the season.

In the fourth quarter, Texas A&M made a long-drive that took up nearly nine minutes. Texas A&M quarterback Stephen McGee had taken so many hard hits that he was throwing up during the game, but he managed to make an 8-yard (7.3 m) touchdown run with 2:32 left to play. A&M was unable to convert their two-point attempt after the touchdown.

With 1:21 seconds left in the game and Texas trailing 12–7, McCoy threw his third interception of the game. Following the change of possession and sometime near the whistle signalling the end of the play on the field, Aggie Kellen Heard knocked McCoy to the ground as McCoy walked along the field unbuckling his chin strap. Heard was ejected from the game as a result of the "cheap-shot late hit" and the Aggies were penalized fifteen yards (14 m). McCoy was later quoted as saying that the tackle had not been a cheap shot. Texas A&M's coach Dennis Franchione later apologized for what he called a "late hit" saying "We do not teach this type of play or condone it." Texas held the Aggies to three-and-out and used all three of their time-outs in order to preserve game time. Texas got the ball back with 48 seconds left in the game.

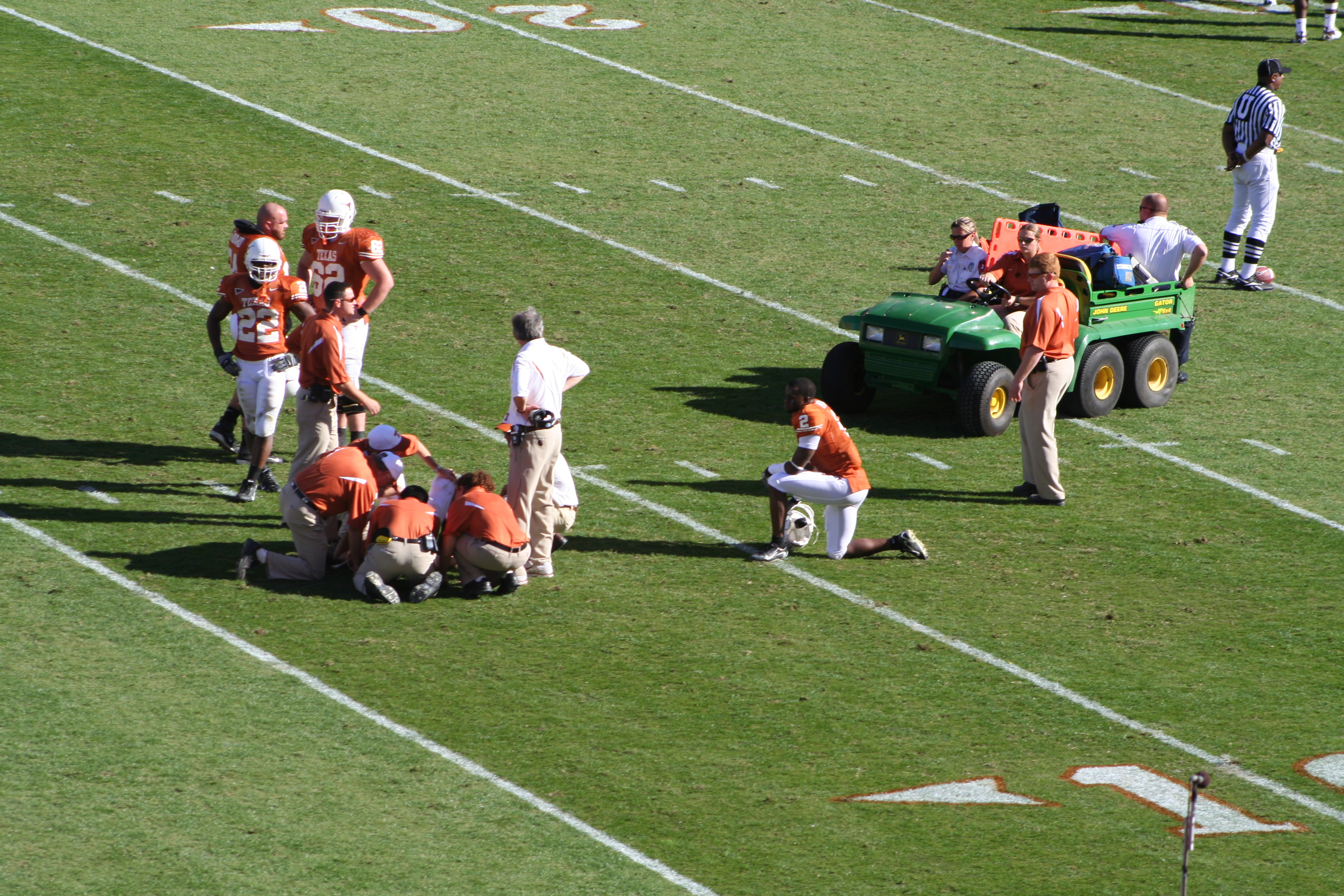
Colt MCoy injured

With 20 seconds remaining in the game, Colt was injured by a "vicious, stadium hushing tackle" as Aggies defensive end Michael Bennett connected with his helmet under McCoy's jaw just as McCoy released a pass. Replays showed both on television and in the stadium revealed the hit included "helmet-to-helmet" contact which, if intentional, is illegal in NCAA football. No flag was thrown on the play. When the replay was shown in the stadium, the Longhorn fans erupted in boos before lapsing back into silence as McCoy lay on the ground for 10 minutes before being taken off the field on a cart. Mack Brown said after the game "I didn't see it, but it sounded like 88,000 (fans) thought it was dirty." Fellow Longhorn Selvin Young said he thought the hit was clean calling it a "textbook hit". McCoy was taken to Brackenridge Hospital where he spent more than three hours undergoing an evaluation that included an X-ray, MRI, and a CAT scan. Longhorns trainer Kenny Boyd said the injury was a severe pinched nerve in McCoy's neck. Boyd said that McCoy was expected to make a full recovery, but no timetable was set for McCoy to return to play. Months later, the Big 12 announced that their officials failed to make the correct call and that a late hit penalty should have been called against A&M's Michael Bennett. Colt McCoy, in a November 2007 interview, stated that neither this nor the earlier Heard tackle had been cheap shots.

Following the injury to McCoy, back-up quarterback Jevan Snead threw an interception on his first play of the game. With the clock rolling on the change of possession, time expired without the Aggies needing to take a play.

The Aggies amassed 244 rushing yards against the nation's top-ranked rushing defense. Texas, normally a potent running team, produced only four rushing first downs and did not have a single run longer than nine yards (8.2 m). Jamaal Charles, in a later interview, stated "We were looking weak. We thought they'd let up because we're Texas." The 12–7 victory was the first time for the Aggies to win in Austin in 12 years. "They shattered all our dreams," declared Longhorn defensive end Brian Orakpo. The game was the 40th consecutive home sell-out for the Longhorns and Justin Blalock became the first player in Texas history to start 50 consecutive game.

=== Pacific Life Holiday Bowl – California ===
	1	2	3	4	Total
#21 Texas A&M	7	3	0	0	10
#19 California	7	7	14	17	45

The 2006 Pacific Life Holiday Bowl was the Aggies' first bowl game since the 2004 SBC Cotton Bowl. This was Dennis Franchione's second bowl appearance in his four years of coaching at Texas A&M. The game in sunny San Diego, California began with Stephen McGee hooking up with Chad Schoeder for a 14-yard TD, but it was all California from then on out. Marshawn Lynch, DeSean Jackson, and Nate Longshore ripped the Aggie defense for 31 points in the second half.
