= 2006 Missouri Tigers football team =

American college football season

2006 Missouri Tigers football

Sun Bowl, L 38–39 vs. Oregon State
- Conference: Big 12 Conference
- North Division
- Record: 8–5 (4–4 Big 12)
- Head coach: Gary Pinkel (6th season)
- Offensive coordinator: Dave Christensen (6th season)
- Offensive scheme: Spread
- Defensive coordinator: Matt Eberflus (6th season)
- Base defense: 4–3
- Home stadium: Faurot Field (Capacity: 68,349)

2006 Big 12 Conference football standings
| | Conf. | | | Overall |
| Team | W | | L | W | | L |
|---|---|---|---|---|---|---|
North Division
| Nebraska x | 6 | – | 2 | 9 | – | 5 |
| Missouri | 4 | – | 4 | 8 | – | 5 |
| Kansas State | 4 | – | 4 | 7 | – | 6 |
| Kansas | 3 | – | 5 | 6 | – | 6 |
| Colorado | 2 | – | 6 | 2 | – | 10 |
| Iowa State | 1 | – | 7 | 4 | – | 8 |
South Division
| No. 11 Oklahoma x$ | 7 | – | 1 | 11 | – | 3 |
| No. 13 Texas | 6 | – | 2 | 10 | – | 3 |
| Texas A&M | 5 | – | 3 | 9 | – | 4 |
| Texas Tech | 4 | – | 4 | 8 | – | 5 |
| Oklahoma State | 3 | – | 5 | 7 | – | 6 |
| Baylor | 3 | – | 5 | 4 | – | 8 |
Championship: Oklahoma 21, Nebraska 7
$ – BCS representative as conference champion; x – Division champion/co-champions; Rankings from AP Poll

The 2006 Missouri Tigers football team represented the University of Missouri during the 2006 NCAA Division I FBS football season. The Tigers went 8–5, including a 4–4 record in Big 12 North play. The season ended with a 39–38 loss in the Sun Bowl to Oregon State at El Paso. They played their home games at Faurot Field in Columbia, Missouri, and was coached by head coach Gary Pinkel.

== Schedule ==
| Date | Time | Opponent | Rank | Site | TV | Result | Attendance |
|---|---|---|---|---|---|---|---|
| September 2 | 6:00 pm | Murray State* | | Faurot Field; Columbia, Missouri | | W 47–7 | 50,074 |
| September 9 | 11:30 am | Ole Miss* | | Faurot Field; Columbia, Missouri | FSN | W 34–7 | 51,112 |
| September 16 | 7:00 pm | at New Mexico* | | University Stadium; Albuquerque, New Mexico | The Mtn. | W 27–17 | 27,806 |
| September 23 | 1:00 pm | Ohio* | | Faurot Field; Columbia, Missouri | | W 31–6 | 50,098 |
| September 30 | 11:30 am | Colorado | No. 25 | Faurot Field; Columbia, Missouri | FSN | W 28–13 | 57,824 |
| October 7 | 6:00 pm | at Texas Tech | No. 23 | Jones SBC Stadium; Lubbock, Texas | TBS | W 38–21 | 49,050 |
| October 14 | 2:30 pm | at Texas A&M | No. 19 | Kyle Field; College Station, Texas | ABC | L 19–25 | 71,136 |
| October 21 | 1:00 pm | Kansas State^{†} | No. 24 | Faurot Field; Columbia, Missouri | | W 41–21 | 64,657 |
| October 28 | 11:00 am | No. 19 Oklahoma | No. 23 | Faurot Field; Columbia, Missouri (Tiger–Sooner Peace Pipe) | ABC | L 10–26 | 62,045 |
| November 4 | 11:00 am | at Nebraska | | Memorial Stadium; Lincoln, Nebraska (rivalry) | ABC | L 20–34 | 85,197 |
| November 18 | 1:00 pm | at Iowa State | | Jack Trice Stadium; Ames, Iowa (Battle for the Telephone Trophy) | | L 16–21 | 39,631 |
| November 25 | 11:00 am | Kansas | | Faurot Field; Columbia, Missouri (Border War) | ABC | W 42–17 | 55,614 |
| December 29 | 12:00 pm | vs. No. 24 Oregon State* | | Sun Bowl Stadium; El Paso, Texas (Sun Bowl) | CBS | L 38–39 | 48,732 |
*Non-conference game; ^{†}Homecoming; Rankings from AP Poll released prior to the game; All times are in Central time

== Rankings ==
Ranking movements Legend: ██ Increase in ranking ██ Decrease in ranking — = Not ranked RV = Received votes
| | Week | | | | | | | | | | | | | | | |
| Poll | Pre | 1 | 2 | 3 | 4 | 5 | 6 | 7 | 8 | 9 | 10 | 11 | 12 | 13 | 14 | Final |
|---|---|---|---|---|---|---|---|---|---|---|---|---|---|---|---|---|
| AP | — | RV | RV | RV | 25 | 23 | 19 | 24 | 23 | RV | — | — | — | — | — | — |
| Coaches | — | RV | RV | RV | RV | 25 | 21 | RV | 23 | 25 | RV | — | — | — | — | — |
| Harris | Not released | | | | 24 | 23 | 17 | 25 | 21 | — | — | — | — | — | — | Not released |
| BCS | Not released | | | | | | | 24 | 20 | — | — | — | — | — | — | Not released |

== Recruits ==
College recruiting information
| Name | Hometown | School | Height | Weight | 40^{‡} | Commit date |
|---|---|---|---|---|---|---|
| Danario Alexander; WR | Marlin, Texas | Marlin HS | 6 ft 3 in (1.91 m) | 185 lb (84 kg) | 4.5 | Dec 29, 2005 |
| Danario Alexander; WR | Recruit ratings: Scout: Rivals: (40) | | | | | |
| Quan Barge; LB | Visalia, California | College of the Sequoias | 6 ft 1 in (1.85 m) | 225 lb (102 kg) | 4.5 | Apr 5, 2006 |
| Quan Barge; LB | Recruit ratings: Rivals: (70) | | | | | |
| Tim Barnes; C | Hughesville, Missouri | Pettis County R-5 Northwest HS | 6 ft 3 in (1.91 m) | 316 lb (143 kg) | 5.7 | Jun 16, 2004 |
| Tim Barnes; C | Recruit ratings: Scout: Rivals: (77) | | | | | |
| Marquis Booker; LB | Ardmore, Oklahoma | Ardmore HS | 6 ft 0 in (1.83 m) | 235 lb (107 kg) | 4.7 | Dec 6, 2005 |
| Marquis Booker; LB | Recruit ratings: Scout: Rivals: (40) | | | | | |
| Castine Bridges; DB | Pleasant Hill, California | Diablo Valley C.C. | 6 ft 2 in (1.88 m) | 195 lb (88 kg) | 4.5 | Dec 5, 2005 |
| Castine Bridges; DB | Recruit ratings: Scout: Rivals: | | | | | |
| Cornelius Brown; DB | Reedley, California | Reedley C.C. | 6 ft 0 in (1.83 m) | 200 lb (91 kg) | 4.5 | Nov 27, 2005 |
| Cornelius Brown; DB | Recruit ratings: Scout: Rivals: | | | | | |
| Justin Brown | Wahpeton, North Dakota | North Dakota State College of Science | 6 ft 2 in (1.88 m) | 195 lb (88 kg) | 4.4 | Dec 19, 2005 |
| Justin Brown | Recruit ratings: Scout: Rivals: | | | | | |
| Tommy Chavis; DT | Kilgore, Texas | Kilgore J.C. | 6 ft 2 in (1.88 m) | 285 lb (129 kg) | 4.8 | Apr 5, 2006 |
| Tommy Chavis; DT | Recruit ratings: Rivals: | | | | | |
| Bart Coslet; DE | Saint Charles, Missouri | Francis Howell Central | 6 ft 6 in (1.98 m) | 225 lb (102 kg) | Feb 12, 2005 | |
| Bart Coslet; DE | Recruit ratings: Scout: Rivals: (40) | | | | | |
| Charles Gaines; DT | Jefferson City, Missouri | Lincoln HS | 6 ft 2 in (1.88 m) | 305 lb (138 kg) | 4.9 | Jul 25, 2006 |
| Charles Gaines; DT | Recruit ratings: No ratings found | | | | | |
| Dominic Grooms; QB | Tampa, Florida | Middleton HS | 6 ft 1 in (1.85 m) | 172 lb (78 kg) | 4.6 | Nov 23, 2005 |
| Dominic Grooms; QB | Recruit ratings: Scout: Rivals: (69) | | | | | |
| Jesse Hernandez; OL | Ardmore, Oklahoma | Ardmore HS | 6 ft 3 in (1.91 m) | 293 lb (133 kg) | Dec 13, 2005 | |
| Jesse Hernandez; OL | Recruit ratings: Scout: Rivals: (40) | | | | | |
| Del Howard; DB | Garland, Texas | South Garland HS | 5 ft 11 in (1.80 m) | 175 lb (79 kg) | 4.5 | Aug 12, 2005 |
| Del Howard; DB | Recruit ratings: Scout: Rivals: (77) | | | | | |
| Jeremy Maclin; WR | St. Louis, Missouri | Kirkwood | 6 ft 0 in (1.83 m) | 187 lb (85 kg) | 4.4 | Dec 20, 2005 |
| Jeremy Maclin; WR | Recruit ratings: Scout: Rivals: (78) | | | | | |
| Jared Perry; WR | La Marque, Texas | La Marque HS | 6 ft 0 in (1.83 m) | 155 lb (70 kg) | 4.6 | Dec 18, 2005 |
| Jared Perry; WR | Recruit ratings: Scout: Rivals: (69) | | | | | |
| Mike Prince; OL | Southlake, Texas | Carroll HS | 6 ft 4 in (1.93 m) | 278 lb (126 kg) | 5.1 | Dec 19, 2005 |
| Mike Prince; OL | Recruit ratings: Scout: Rivals: (77) | | | | | |
| Kevin Rutland; DB | Galena Park, Texas | North Shore HS | 6 ft 1 in (1.85 m) | 185 lb (84 kg) | 4.5 | Dec 23, 2005 |
| Kevin Rutland; DB | Recruit ratings: Scout: Rivals: (76) | | | | | |
| Brant Scott; DT | College Station, Texas | A&M Consolidated | 6 ft 2 in (1.88 m) | 256 lb (116 kg) | 5.1 | Dec 26, 2005 |
| Brant Scott; DT | Recruit ratings: Scout: Rivals: (40) | | | | | |
| Paul Simpson; WR | Hayward, California | Chabot C.C. | 6 ft 2 in (1.88 m) | 185 lb (84 kg) | 4.5 | Dec 23, 2005 |
| Paul Simpson; WR | Recruit ratings: Scout: Rivals: | | | | | |
| John Stull; DE | Columbia, Missouri | Rock Bridge HS | 6 ft 4 in (1.93 m) | 250 lb (110 kg) | 4.9 | Oct 3, 2005 |
| John Stull; DE | Recruit ratings: Scout: Rivals: (40) | | | | | |
| Terris Phillips; DB | St. Louis, Missouri | Murrieta Valley HS | 5 ft 11 in (1.80 m) | 195 lb (88 kg) | 4.3 | Oct 3, 2005 |
| Terris Phillips; DB | Recruit ratings: Scout: Rivals: (40) | | | | | |
| La'Roderick Thomas; ATH | Dallas, Texas | South Oak Cliff HS | 6 ft 2 in (1.88 m) | 190 lb (86 kg) | 4.5 | Dec 19, 2005 |
| La'Roderick Thomas; ATH | Recruit ratings: Scout: Rivals: (40) | | | | | |
| J.P. Tillman; QB | Cypress, Texas | Cy Falls | 6 ft 3 in (1.91 m) | 233 lb (106 kg) | 4.7 | Jul 31, 2005 |
| J.P. Tillman; QB | Recruit ratings: Scout: Rivals: (72) | | | | | |
| Tremane Vaughns; DB | Pasadena, California | Pasadena City C.C. | 5 ft 9 in (1.75 m) | 180 lb (82 kg) | 4.4 | Dec 18, 2005 |
| Tremane Vaughns; DB | Recruit ratings: Scout: Rivals: | | | | | |
| Sean Weatherspoon; LB | Jasper, Texas | Jasper HS | 6 ft 1 in (1.85 m) | 195 lb (88 kg) | 4.5 | Dec 26, 2005 |
| Sean Weatherspoon; LB | Recruit ratings: Scout: Rivals: (40) | | | | | |
Overall recruit ranking: Scout: 38 Rivals: 41
‡ Refers to 40-yard dash; Note: In many cases, Scout, Rivals, 247Sports, On3, and ESPN may conflict in their listings of height, weight and 40 time.; In these cases, the average was taken. ESPN grades are on a 100-point scale.; Sources: "Missouri 2006 Football Commitments". Rivals.; "2006 Missouri Commits". Scout.; "2006 Player Commitments – Missouri". ESPN.; "Scout.com Team Recruiting Rankings". Scout.; "2006 Team Ranking". Rivals.com.
