= 2006 Baylor Bears football team =

American college football season

2006 Baylor Bears football
- Conference: Big 12 Conference
- South Division
- Record: 4–8 (3–5 Big 12)
- Head coach: Guy Morriss (4th season)
- Offensive coordinator: Lee Hays (1st season)
- Offensive scheme: Spread
- Defensive coordinator: Bill Bradley (3rd season)
- Base defense: 4–2
- Home stadium: Floyd Casey Stadium

2006 Big 12 Conference football standings
	Conf.			Overall
Team	W		L	W		L
North Division
Nebraska x	6	–	2	9	–	5
Missouri	4	–	4	8	–	5
Kansas State	4	–	4	7	–	6
Kansas	3	–	5	6	–	6
Colorado	2	–	6	2	–	10
Iowa State	1	–	7	4	–	8
South Division
No. 11 Oklahoma x$	7	–	1	11	–	3
No. 13 Texas	6	–	2	10	–	3
Texas A&M	5	–	3	9	–	4
Texas Tech	4	–	4	8	–	5
Oklahoma State	3	–	5	7	–	6
Baylor	3	–	5	4	–	8
Championship: Oklahoma 21, Nebraska 7
$ – BCS representative as conference champion; x – Division champion/co-champions; Rankings from AP Poll

The 2006 Baylor Bears football team (variously "Baylor", "BU", or the "Bears") represented Baylor University during the 2006 NCAA Division I FBS football season. They were represented in the Big 12 Conference in the South Division. They played their home games at Floyd Casey Stadium in Waco, Texas. They were coached by head coach Guy Morriss.

== Schedule ==
Date	Time	Opponent	Site	TV	Result	Attendance
September 3	4:30 p.m.	No. 22 TCU*	Floyd Casey Stadium; Waco, Texas (rivalry)	FSN	L 7–17	42,733
September 9	6:00 p.m.	Northwestern State*	Floyd Casey Stadium; Waco, Texas		W 47–10	31,125
September 16	4:00 p.m.	at Washington State*	Qwest Field; Seattle		L 15–17	41,358
September 23	6:00 p.m.	Army*	Floyd Casey Stadium; Waco, Texas		L 20–27 ^{OT}	36,218
September 30	6:00 p.m.	Kansas State	Floyd Casey Stadium; Waco, Texas		W 17–3	30,752
October 7	2:30 p.m.	at Colorado	Folsom Field; Boulder, Colorado		W 34–31 ^{3OT}	47,065
October 14	6:00 p.m.	at No. 6 Texas	Darrell K Royal–Texas Memorial Stadium; Austin, Texas (rivalry)	TBS	L 31–63	88,966
October 21	2:00 p.m.	Kansas^{†}	Floyd Casey Stadium; Waco, Texas		W 36–35	36,125
October 28	6:00 p.m.	No. 23 Texas A&M	Floyd Casey Stadium; Waco, Texas (Battle of the Brazos)		L 21–31	51,385
November 4	11:00 a.m.	at Texas Tech	Jones SBC Stadium; Lubbock, Texas (rivalry)	FSN	L 21–55	51,303
November 11	11:30 a.m.	at Oklahoma State	Boone Pickens Stadium; Stillwater, Oklahoma	FSN	L 24–66	35,430
November 18	11:00 a.m.	No. 16 Oklahoma	Floyd Casey Stadium; Waco, Texas	FSN	L 10–36	31,221
*Non-conference game; ^{†}Homecoming; Rankings from AP Poll released prior to the game; All times are in Central time

== Game summaries ==
=== No. 22 TCU ===
	1	2	3	4	Total
No. 22 Horned Frogs	0	0	10	7	17
Bears	0	7	0	0	7

=== Northwestern State ===
	1	2	3	4	Total
Demons	0	0	10	0	10
Bears	14	6	7	20	47

=== At Washington State ===
	1	2	3	4	Total
Bears	9	0	0	6	15
Cougars	0	7	7	3	17

=== Army ===
	1	2	3	4	OT	Total
Black Knights	0	3	7	10	7	27
Bears	10	0	7	3	0	20

=== Kansas State ===
	1	2	3	4	Total
Wildcats	0	3	0	0	3
Bears	7	0	10	0	17

=== At Colorado ===
	1	2	3	4	OT	2OT	3OT	Total
Bears	0	10	0	7	7	7	3	34
Buffaloes	7	0	3	7	7	7	0	31

=== At No. 6 Texas ===
	1	2	3	4	Total
Bears	10	0	14	7	31
No. 6 Longhorns	0	28	14	21	63

=== Kansas ===
	1	2	3	4	Total
Jayhawks	14	21	0	0	35
Bears	7	10	0	19	36

=== No. 23 Texas A&M ===
	1	2	3	4	Total
No. 23 Aggies	6	15	0	10	31
Bears	7	7	7	0	21

=== At Texas Tech ===
	1	2	3	4	Total
Bears	7	7	7	0	21
Red Raiders	7	21	14	13	55

=== At Oklahoma State ===
	1	2	3	4	Total
Bears	3	0	7	14	24
Cowboys	10	28	14	14	66

=== No. 16 Oklahoma ===
	1	2	3	4	Total
No. 16 Sooners	13	0	23	0	36
Bears	3	0	0	7	10
