= 2006 Iowa State Cyclones football team =

American college football season

2006 Iowa State Cyclones football
- Conference: Big 12 Conference
- North Division
- Record: 4–8 (1–7 Big 12)
- Head coach: Dan McCarney (12th season)
- Offensive coordinator: Barney Cotton (3rd season)
- Offensive scheme: Spread
- Defensive coordinator: John Skladany (10th season)
- Base defense: 4–3
- Home stadium: Jack Trice Stadium

2006 Big 12 Conference football standings
	Conf.			Overall
Team	W		L	W		L
North Division
Nebraska x	6	–	2	9	–	5
Missouri	4	–	4	8	–	5
Kansas State	4	–	4	7	–	6
Kansas	3	–	5	6	–	6
Colorado	2	–	6	2	–	10
Iowa State	1	–	7	4	–	8
South Division
No. 11 Oklahoma x$	7	–	1	11	–	3
No. 13 Texas	6	–	2	10	–	3
Texas A&M	5	–	3	9	–	4
Texas Tech	4	–	4	8	–	5
Oklahoma State	3	–	5	7	–	6
Baylor	3	–	5	4	–	8
Championship: Oklahoma 21, Nebraska 7
$ – BCS representative as conference champion; x – Division champion/co-champions; Rankings from AP Poll

The 2006 Iowa State Cyclones football team represented Iowa State University as a member of the North Division in the Big 12 Conference during the 2006 NCAA Division I FBS football season. Led by Dan McCarney in his 12th and final season as head coach, the Cyclones compiled an overall record of 4–8 with a mark of 1–7 in conference play, placing last out of six team in the Big 12's North Division. The team played home games at Jack Trice Stadium in Ames, Iowa.

== Schedule ==
Date	Time	Opponent	Site	TV	Result	Attendance
August 31	7:00 p.m.	Toledo*	Jack Trice Stadium; Ames, IA	MC22	W 45–43 ^{OT}	42,531
September 9	6:00 p.m.	UNLV*	Jack Trice Stadium; Ames, IA		W 16–10	45,795
September 16	11:00 a.m.	at No. 16 Iowa*	Kinnick Stadium; Iowa City, IA (rivalry)	ESPN	L 17–27	70,585
September 23	2:30 p.m.	at No. 7 Texas	Darrell K Royal–Texas Memorial Stadium; Austin, TX	ABC	L 14–37	88,792
September 30	6:00 p.m.	No. 13 (FCS) Northern Iowa*	Jack Trice Stadium; Ames, IA		W 28–27	55,518
October 7	7:00 p.m.	No. 22 Nebraska	Jack Trice Stadium; Ames, IA (rivalry)	ABC	L 14–28	55,338
October 14	11:30 a.m.	at No. 23 Oklahoma	Gaylord Family Oklahoma Memorial Stadium; Norman, OK	FSN	L 9–34	84,152
October 21	2:30 p.m.	Texas Tech^{†}	Jack Trice Stadium; Ames, IA		L 26–42	44,112
October 28	2:35 p.m.	at Kansas State	Bill Snyder Family Football Stadium; Manhattan, KS (rivalry)		L 10–31	44,729
November 4	1:00 p.m.	Kansas	Jack Trice Stadium; Ames, IA	FCS Central	L 10–41	40,272
November 11	2:00 p.m.	at Colorado	Folsom Field; Boulder, CO		L 16–35	43,056
November 18	1:00 p.m.	Missouri	Jack Trice Stadium; Ames, IA (rivalry)		W 21–16	39,631
*Non-conference game; ^{†}Homecoming; Rankings from AP Poll released prior to the game; All times are in Central time
