= Chris Patrick (gridiron football) =

American gridiron football player (born 1984)

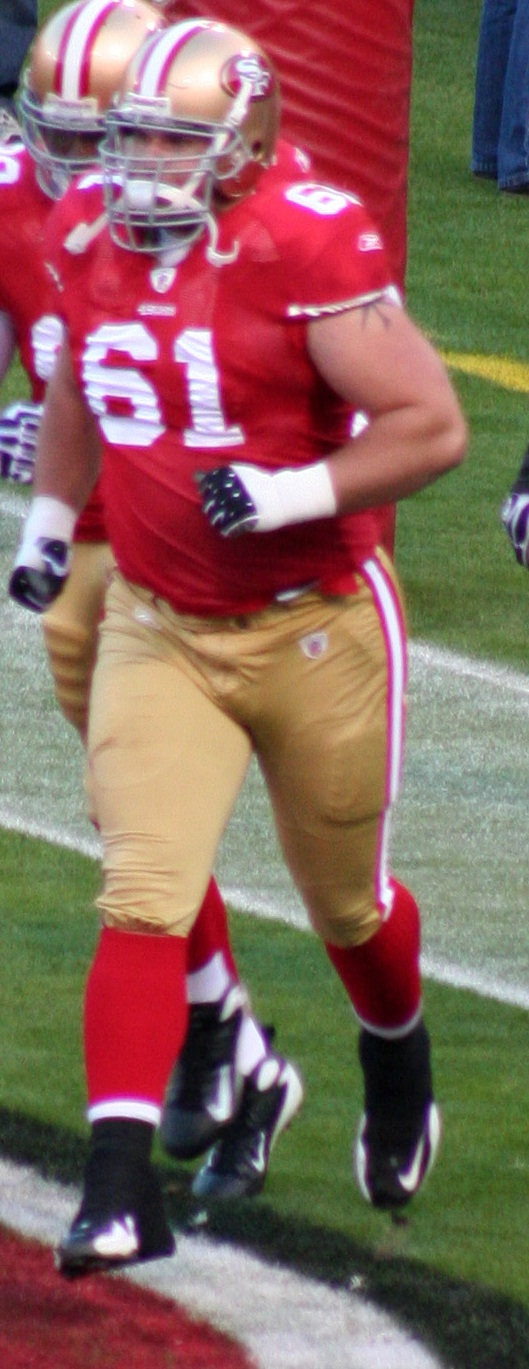
- Patrick with the San Francisco 49ers in 2009

No. 61
- Position: Offensive tackle

Personal information
- Born: September 22, 1984 (age 42); Ithaca, Michigan, U.S.
- Listed height: 6 ft 4 in (1.93 m)
- Listed weight: 310 lb (141 kg)

Career information
- College: Nebraska
- NFL draft: 2007: undrafted

Career history
- New York Giants (2007)*; New England Patriots (2007)*; Green Bay Packers (2007–2008)*; Detroit Lions (2008)*; San Francisco 49ers (2008)*; Philadelphia Eagles (2008); Kansas City Chiefs (2009)*; San Francisco 49ers (2009–2010); Virginia Destroyers (2011)*; Edmonton Eskimos (2011); Toronto Argonauts (2012)*; Saskatchewan Roughriders (2012)
- * Offseason or practice squad member only

Career NFL statistics
- Games played: 3
- Stats at Pro Football Reference

Chris Patrick (born September 22, 1984) is an American former professional football player who was an offensive tackle in the National Football League (NFL). He played college football for the Nebraska Cornhuskers before being signed by the New York Giants as an undrafted free agent in 2007.

Patrick was also a member of the New England Patriots, Green Bay Packers, Detroit Lions, Philadelphia Eagles, Kansas City Chiefs, San Francisco 49ers, Edmonton Eskimos, Toronto Argonauts, Virginia Destroyers, and Saskatchewan Roughriders.

== Professional career ==
Patrick was originally entered in the NFL supplemental draft after forgoing his senior year at the University of Nebraska–Lincoln and missing the deadline for the traditional NFL draft.

He was added to the Eagles' 53-man roster for the final seven (4 regular season and 3 playoff) games of the 2008 NFL season, but saw no game action. After starting the 2009 NFL season with the Chiefs as a member of that team's practice squad, Patrick signed with the 49ers in late October to add depth to the offensive line. He made his first NFL regular-season appearance on November 22 against the Green Bay Packers at Lambeau Field. Patrick appeared in two more games in the 2009 season, December 14 against the Arizona Cardinals - his Candlestick Park debut - and January 3 at the St. Louis Rams. All three appearances came on special teams.

Patrick was waived by the 49ers on August 18, 2010.

Patrick signed with the Edmonton Eskimos as a free agent on August 16, 2011, dressed for 11 games (starting 10 games) in the 2011 season, and was released by the Edmonton Eskimos on January 18, 2012.

On May 16, 2012, Patrick signed as a free agent with the Toronto Argonauts. On June 10, 2012, the Toronto Argonauts traded Patrick to the Saskatchewan Roughriders for a 2014 conditional draft pick.

Patrick was released by the Saskatchewan Roughriders on August 16, 2012.
