= Bo Ruud =

American football player (born 1984)

No. 51
- Position: Linebacker

Personal information
- Born: September 2, 1984 (age 42); Lincoln, Nebraska, U.S.
- Listed height: 6 ft 3 in (1.91 m)
- Listed weight: 234 lb (106 kg)

Career information
- High school: Lincoln (NE) Southeast
- College: Nebraska
- NFL draft: 2008: 6th round, 197th overall pick

Career history
- New England Patriots (2008); Cleveland Browns (2009)*; Tampa Bay Buccaneers (2009)*; Florida Tuskers (2010)*
- * Offseason or practice squad member only

Awards and highlights
- First-team All-Big 12 (2006)
- Stats at Pro Football Reference

Bo Ruud (born September 2, 1984) is an American former professional football linebacker. He was selected by the New England Patriots in the sixth round of the 2008 NFL draft. He played college football at Nebraska.

Ruud was also a member of the Cleveland Browns, Tampa Bay Buccaneers, and Florida Tuskers. He is the younger brother of NFL linebacker Barrett Ruud, as well as the son of former NFL linebacker Tom Ruud.

== Early life ==
He played high school football at Lincoln Southeast High School. Ruud was a standout at Lincoln Southeast, and was Nebraska's earliest ever commitment, pledging his intention in June 2001, 20 months before 2003 signing day. He had a standout prep career, helping the Knights to two Class A state titles. He was a two-way star, playing running back and linebacker. Ruud rushed for 1,385 yards and 15 touchdowns and caught four passes for 125 yards and a pair of touchdowns.

Ruud scored four touchdowns in a state semifinal win over Kearney and scored the Knights' only touchdown in a 7-6 title game victory over Millard North. He had 70 total tackles, including 51 solo stops, as a senior. Ruud was named the honorary captain of the Lincoln Journal Star's Super-State team and was a first-team pick as a running back. The Omaha World-Herald named him to its All-Nebraska team as a linebacker and made him the honorary captain on the defense.

Ruud made 49 tackles as a junior, and rushed for nearly 450 yards and scored six touchdowns. Ruud also starred on Southeast's basketball team, which finished as the 2003 Class A state runner-up. He was a two-time honorable-mention all-state pick and earned academic all-state honors, and was a National Honor Society member.

== College career ==
Ruud was a four-year letterman, finished his college career in 2007. He was a three-year starter. He totaled 216 career tackles rank 22nd on the Nebraska career chart and finished with six career fumbles caused, four fumble recoveries and five interceptions. Ruud lined up as the weakside linebacker for his first three years, before switching to the strongside spot as a senior. He played in and started 10 games and made 54 tackles, including 28 solo stops. He also added four tackles for loss and caused a pair of fumbles.

Ruud started 13 games at weakside linebacker in 2006, and earned First-team All-Big 12 honors from the league coaches. He tied for fourth on the team with 65 tackles and made seven tackles for loss helping Nebraska rank among the Big 12 leaders in scoring defense and rushing defense. Ruud also had two sacks, two interceptions, a team-high three forced fumbles and also recovered a pair of fumbles. Ruud earned the starting job his sophomore season of 2005 and earned honorable-mention All-Big 12 honors. He made 80 tackles and tied for third on the team with 14 tackles for loss. In 2004, he was a redshirt freshman and he played in all 11 games and finished with 17 total tackles, including 12 solo stops. In 2003, he was a redshirt.

A business administration major, Ruud was a two-time Second-team academic All-Big 12 selection and a four-time member of the Big 12 Commissioner's Academic Honor Roll. He was one of 20 Huskers to graduate in December, 2007.

== Professional career ==
Pre-draft measurables
Height	Weight	40-yard dash	10-yard split	20-yard split	20-yard shuttle	Three-cone drill	Vertical jump	Broad jump	Bench press
6 ft 3 3/8 in (1.91 m)	234 lb (106 kg)	4.60 s	1.53 s	2.61 s	4.71 s	7.30 s	32.5 in (0.83 m)	9 ft 10 in (3.00 m)	18 reps
All values from Pro Day

=== New England Patriots ===
Ruud was selected by the New England Patriots in the sixth round (197th overall) of the 2008 NFL draft. He spent his rookie season on injured reserve. The Patriots waived Ruud on April 29, 2009.

=== Cleveland Browns ===
Ruud was claimed off waivers by the Cleveland Browns on April 30, 2009. He was waived by the team on August 17.

=== Tampa Bay Buccaneers ===
Ruud was signed by the Tampa Bay Buccaneers on August 24, 2009. The move reunited him with older brother, former college teammate and Buccaneers starting linebacker Barrett Ruud. He was waived by the Buccaneers on September 5, 2009.
