= 2006 Big 12 Championship Game =

2006 Dr Pepper Big 12 Championship Game
- Conference Championship
- 2006 Big 12 Championship logo.
Nebraska Cornhuskers	Oklahoma Sooners
(9–3)	(10–2)
7	21
Head coach: Bill Callahan	Head coach: Bob Stoops
AP / Coaches / BCS; 19 / 18 / 20	AP / Coaches / BCS; 8 / 10 / 12
	1	2	3	4	Total
Nebraska	0	7	0	0	7
Oklahoma	14	0	7	0	21
- Date: December 2, 2006
- Season: 2006
- Stadium: Arrowhead Stadium
- Location: Kansas City, Missouri
- MVP: WR Malcolm Kelly
- Referee: Randy Christal
- Attendance: 80,031

United States TV coverage
- Network: ABC
- Announcers: Mike Patrick and Todd Blackledge

The 2006 Dr Pepper Big 12 Championship Game was held on December 2, 2006, at Arrowhead Stadium in Kansas City, Missouri, and pit the divisional winners from the Big 12 Conference: the Nebraska Cornhuskers, winner of the North division against the Oklahoma Sooners, winner of the South division. The Sooners defeated the Cornhuskers, 21-7. This was the first time the two teams had ever met in the Big 12 conference championship game.

== Regular season ==
2006 Big 12 Conference football standings
	Conf.			Overall
Team	W		L	W		L
North Division
Nebraska x	6	–	2	9	–	5
Missouri	4	–	4	8	–	5
Kansas State	4	–	4	7	–	6
Kansas	3	–	5	6	–	6
Colorado	2	–	6	2	–	10
Iowa State	1	–	7	4	–	8
South Division
No. 11 Oklahoma x$	7	–	1	11	–	3
No. 13 Texas	6	–	2	10	–	3
Texas A&M	5	–	3	9	–	4
Texas Tech	4	–	4	8	–	5
Oklahoma State	3	–	5	7	–	6
Baylor	3	–	5	4	–	8
Championship: Oklahoma 21, Nebraska 7
$ – BCS representative as conference champion; x – Division champion/co-champions; Rankings from AP Poll

== After the Championship game ==
The Sooners went on to play in the Fiesta Bowl and lose to Boise State Broncos in one of the most historic upsets in BCS and bowl game history, not only because of the winner, but the way in which Boise State used a trick play to win the game.

Nebraska went on to lose to the Auburn Tigers in the Cotton Bowl Classic, 17 to 14.

== See also ==
- 1979 Orange Bowl – NCAA football bowl game
- Nebraska–Oklahoma football rivalry – American college football rivalry
