= 2007 NFL draft =

Selection of American football players

General information
- Date: April 28–29, 2007
- Time: Noon EDT (April 28); 11:00 am EDT (April 29)
- Location: Radio City Music Hall in New York City, New York
- Networks: ESPN, ESPN2, NFL Network

Overview
- 255 total selections in 7 rounds
- League: NFL
- First selection: JaMarcus Russell, QB; Oakland Raiders
- Mr. Irrelevant: Ramzee Robinson, CB; Detroit Lions
- Most selections (11): Atlanta Falcons; Green Bay Packers; Jacksonville Jaguars; Oakland Raiders
- Fewest selections (4): Denver Broncos; New York Jets
- Hall of Famers: 4: WR Calvin Johnson; OT Joe Thomas; LB Patrick Willis; CB Darrelle Revis

The 2007 NFL draft was the 72nd annual meeting of National Football League franchises to select newly eligible American football players. It took place at Radio City Music Hall in New York City, New York, on April 28 and April 29, 2007. The draft was televised for the 28th consecutive year on ESPN and ESPN2. The NFL Network also broadcast coverage of the event, its second year doing so, the first being the previous year in 2006. There were 255 draft selections: 223 regular selections (instead of the typical 224) and 32 compensatory selections. A supplemental draft was also held after the regular draft and before the regular season. This was the first draft presided over by new NFL Commissioner Roger Goodell.

The first round was the longest in the history of the NFL draft, lasting six hours, eight minutes. LSU quarterback JaMarcus Russell was selected first overall by the Oakland Raiders after he had beaten Brady Quinn as the projected first selection among most analysts following his performance in the 2007 Sugar Bowl against Quinn and Notre Dame. Russell is considered by many as one of the biggest draft busts in NFL history, and was out of the NFL after only three seasons. Quinn also had a largely unsuccessful pro career and was also considered a draft bust, and he would also be out of the NFL after only seven seasons. The Detroit Lions selected cornerback Ramzee Robinson out of Alabama with the final pick in the draft, commonly called Mr. Irrelevant.

Those selections notwithstanding, Bleacher Report named the 2007 draft class the "greatest draft class in the last 25 years" in 2012 due to the heavy volume of reliable starters, as well as players selected that are now widely regarded as future Hall of Famers, such as Patrick Willis, Darrelle Revis, Marshawn Lynch, and Marshal Yanda; first round selections Calvin Johnson, Joe Thomas, and Adrian Peterson are widely regarded as being among the greatest to ever play at their respective positions.

As of 2026, only one player from the 2007 draft class remains active in the NFL: Falcons placekicker Nick Folk.

== Player breakdown ==
The following is the breakdown of the 255 players by position:

- 34 wide receivers
- 33 linebackers
- 30 cornerbacks
- 25 defensive ends
- 22 offensive tackles
- 20 safeties
- 18 defensive tackles
- 18 running backs
- 13 tight ends
- 12 guards
- 11 quarterbacks
- 7 centers
- 6 fullbacks
- 3 kickers
- 3 punters

- Nine Florida Gators were drafted, more than any other university. Ohio State was second with eight players selected. However, only one of the 17 players drafted from the two universities has made it to a Pro Bowl, Reggie Nelson.
- Of the 40 underclassmen who entered the draft, 29 were selected.
- Louisiana State University set a school record with four players drafted in the first round.

== Player selections ==
*	= compensatory selection
^	= supplemental compensatory selection
^{†}	= Pro Bowler (Note: Players are identified as a Pro Bowler if they were selected for the Pro Bowl at any time in their career.)
‡	= Hall of Famer (Note: Players are identified as a Hall of Famer if they have been inducted into the Pro Football Hall of Fame.)

Positions key
Offense	Defense	Special teams
QB — Quarterback; RB — Running back; FB — Fullback; WR — Wide receiver; TE — Tight end; OL — Offensive lineman; T — Tackle; G — Guard; C — Center	DL — Defensive lineman; DT — Defensive tackle (Note: Includes nose tackle (NT)); DE — Defensive end; EDGE — Edge rusher; LB — Linebacker (Note: Includes middle linebacker (MLB/MIKE), weakside linebacker (WILL), strongside linebacker (SAM), off-ball linebacker, and outside linebacker (OLB)); DB — Defensive back; CB — Cornerback; S — Safety (Note: Includes free safety (FS) and strong safety (SS))	K — Kicker (Note: Also known as a placekicker (PK)); P — Punter; LS — Long snapper; RS — Return specialist (Note: Includes kickoff and punt returners)

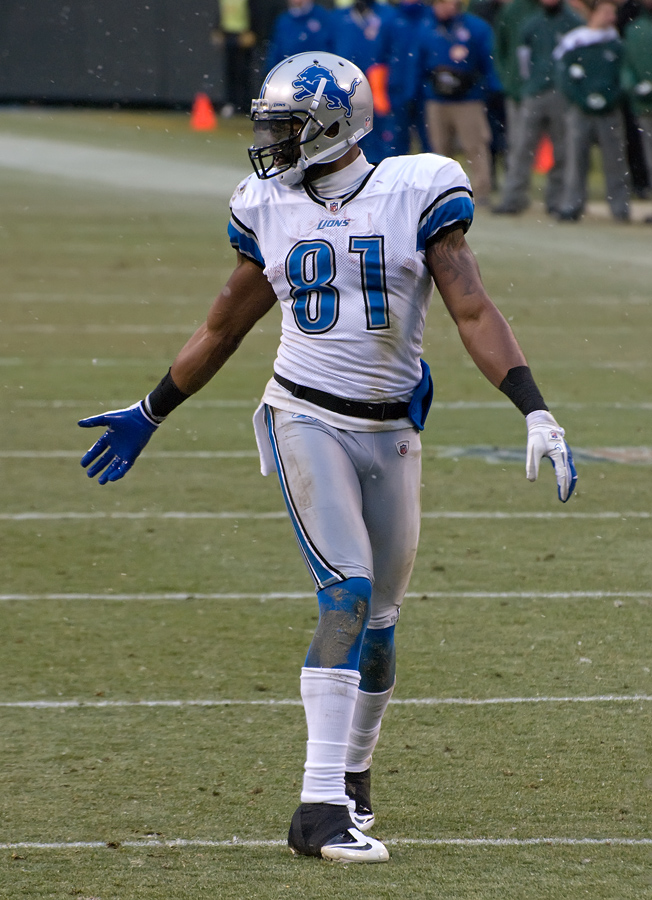
Calvin Johnson

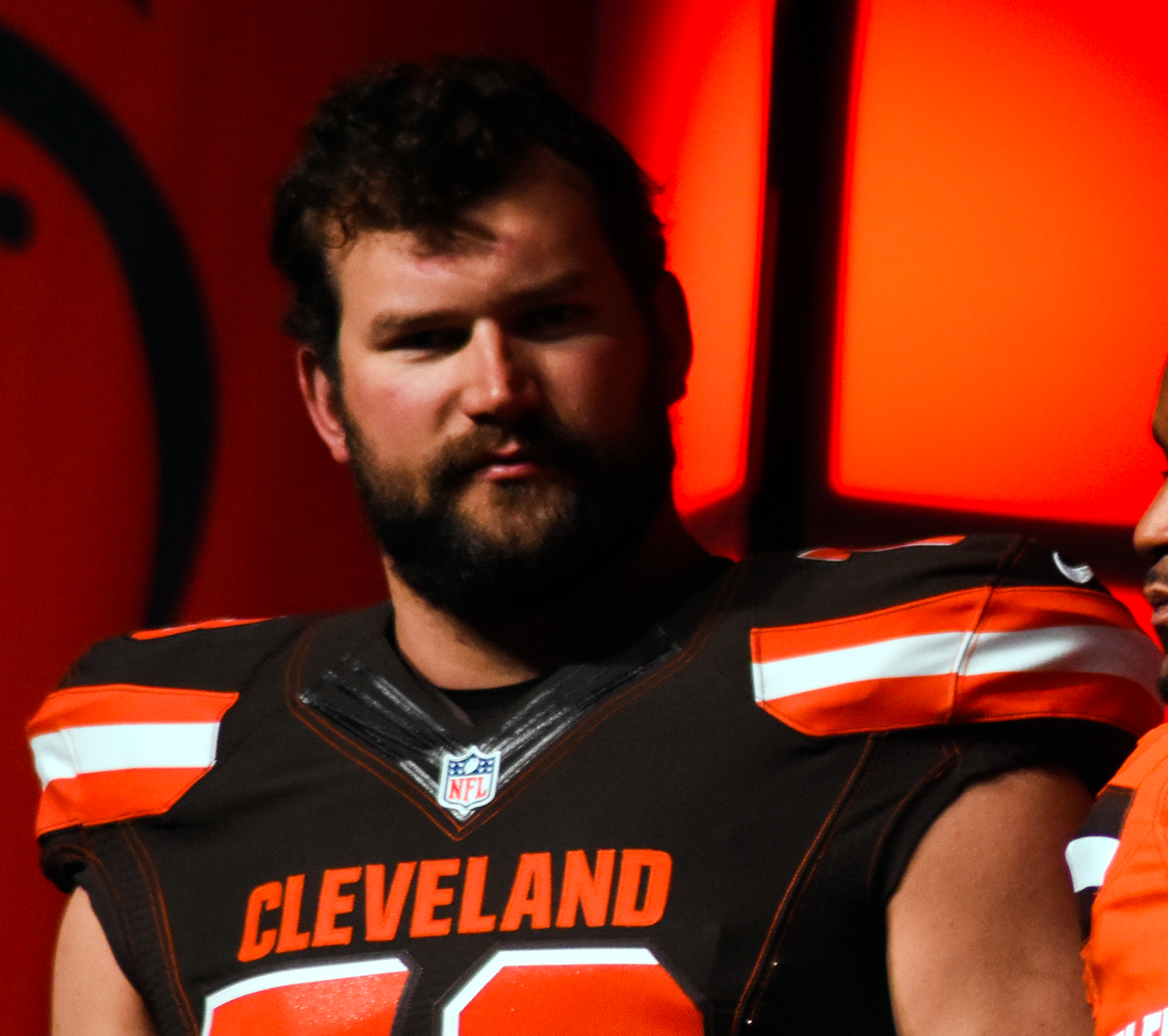
Joe Thomas

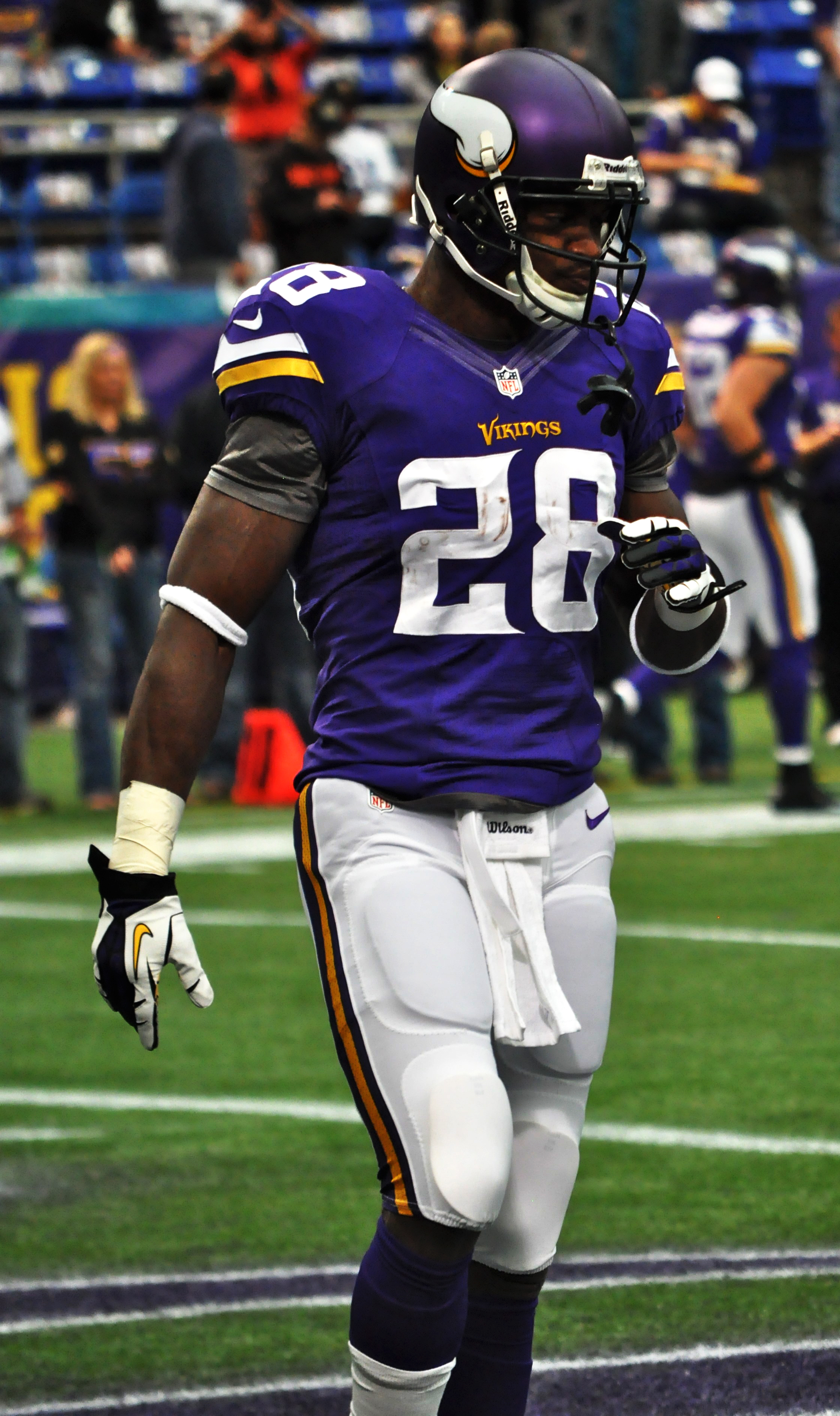
Adrian Peterson

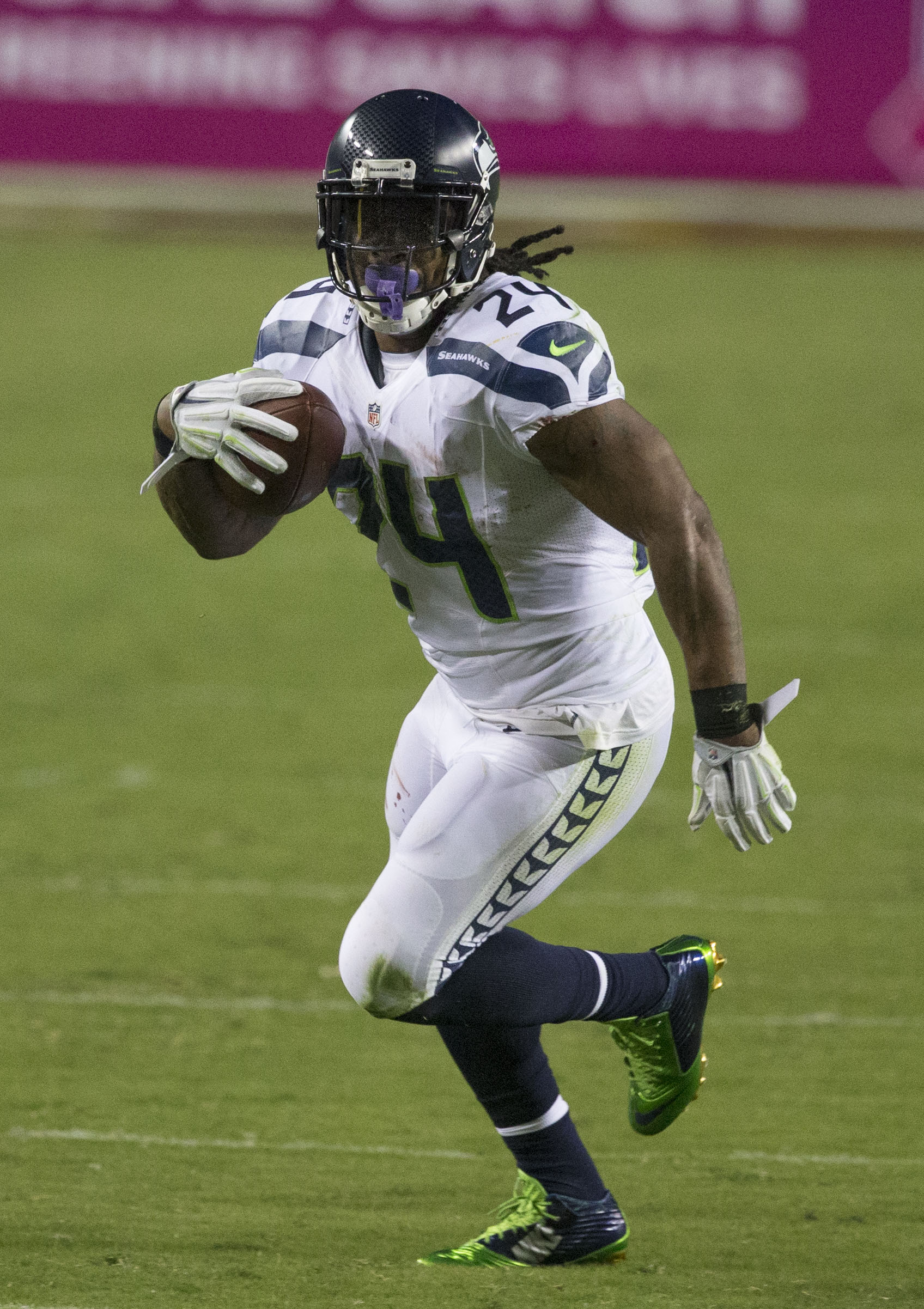
Marshawn Lynch

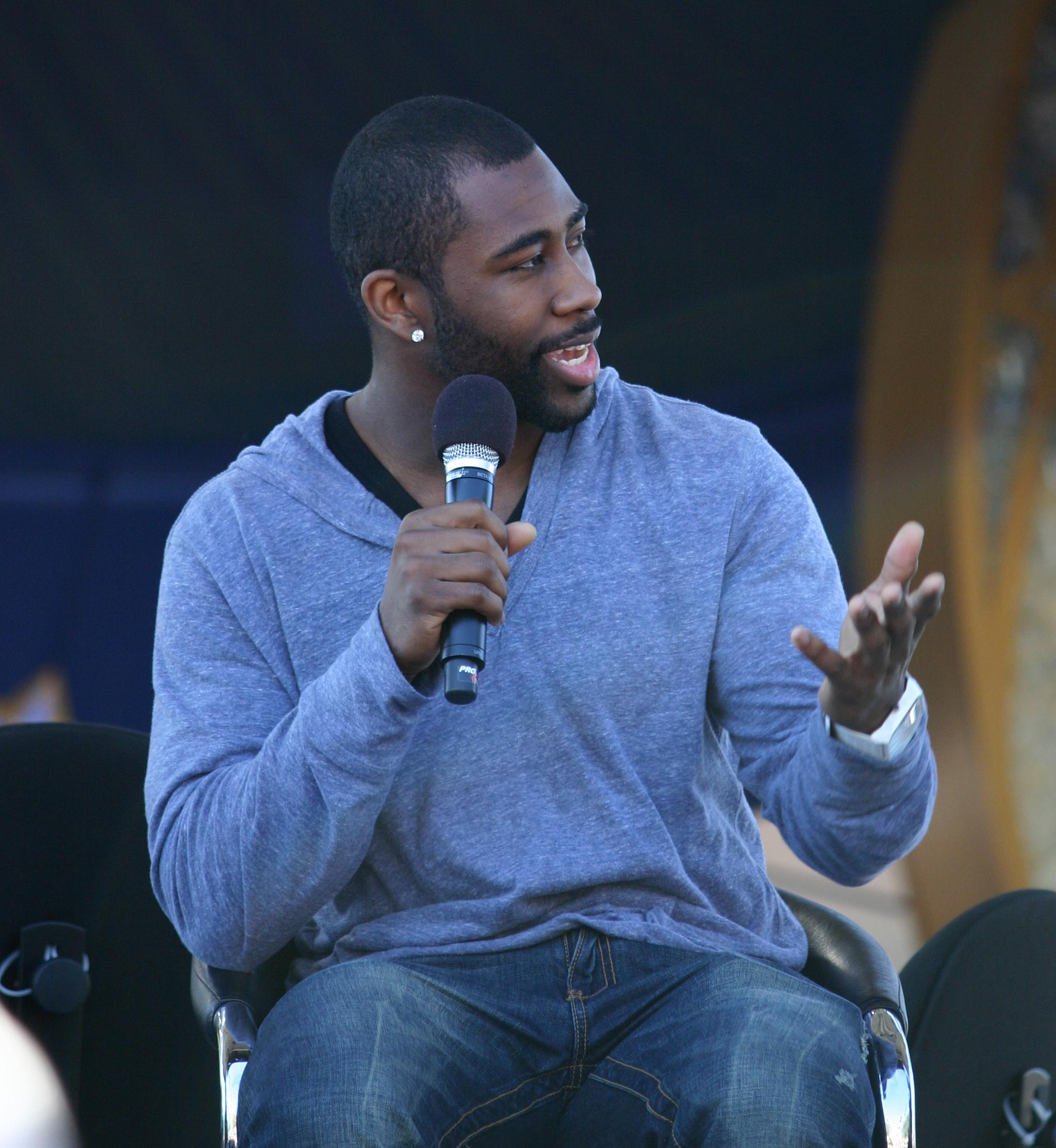
Darrelle Revis

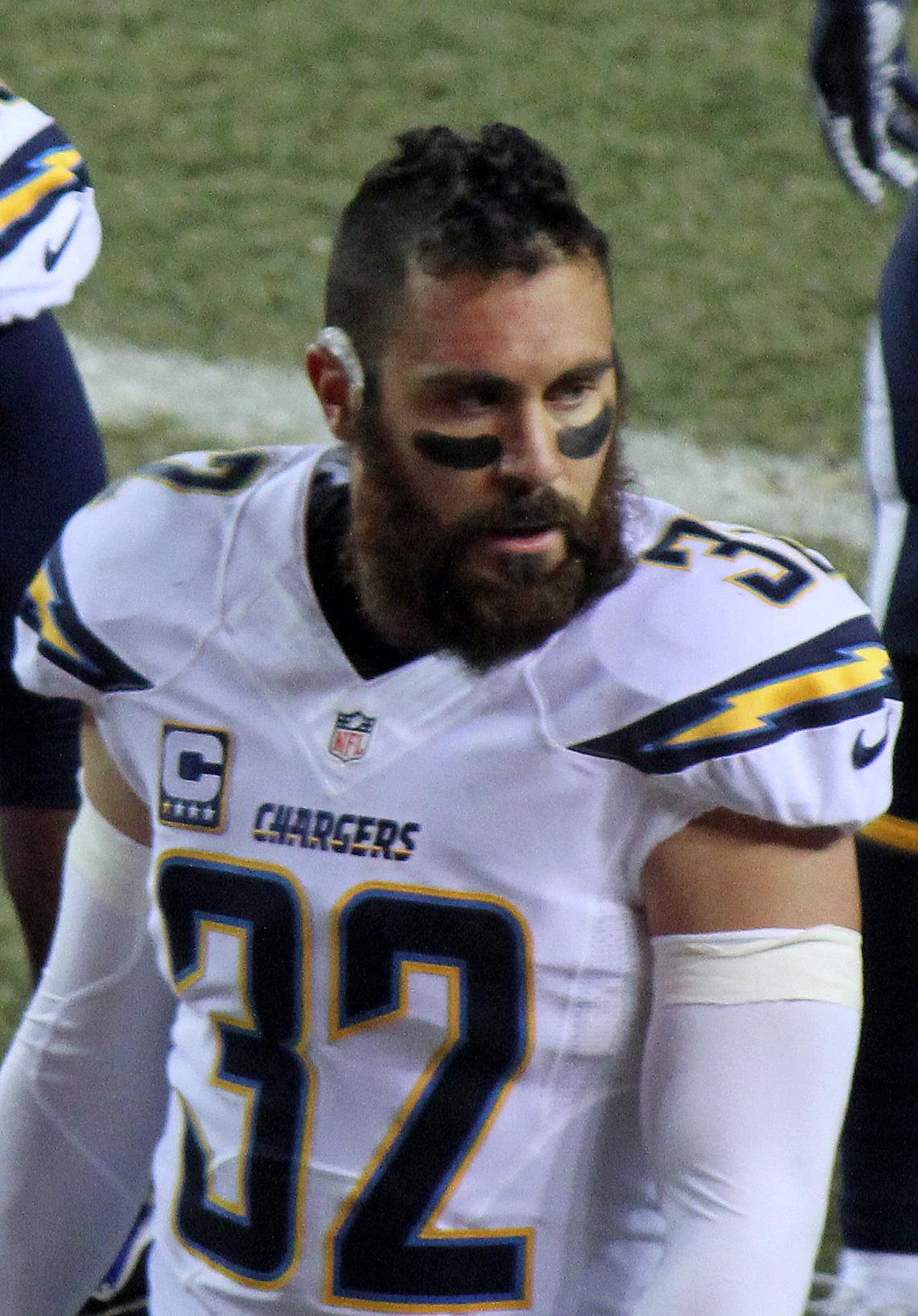
Eric Weddle

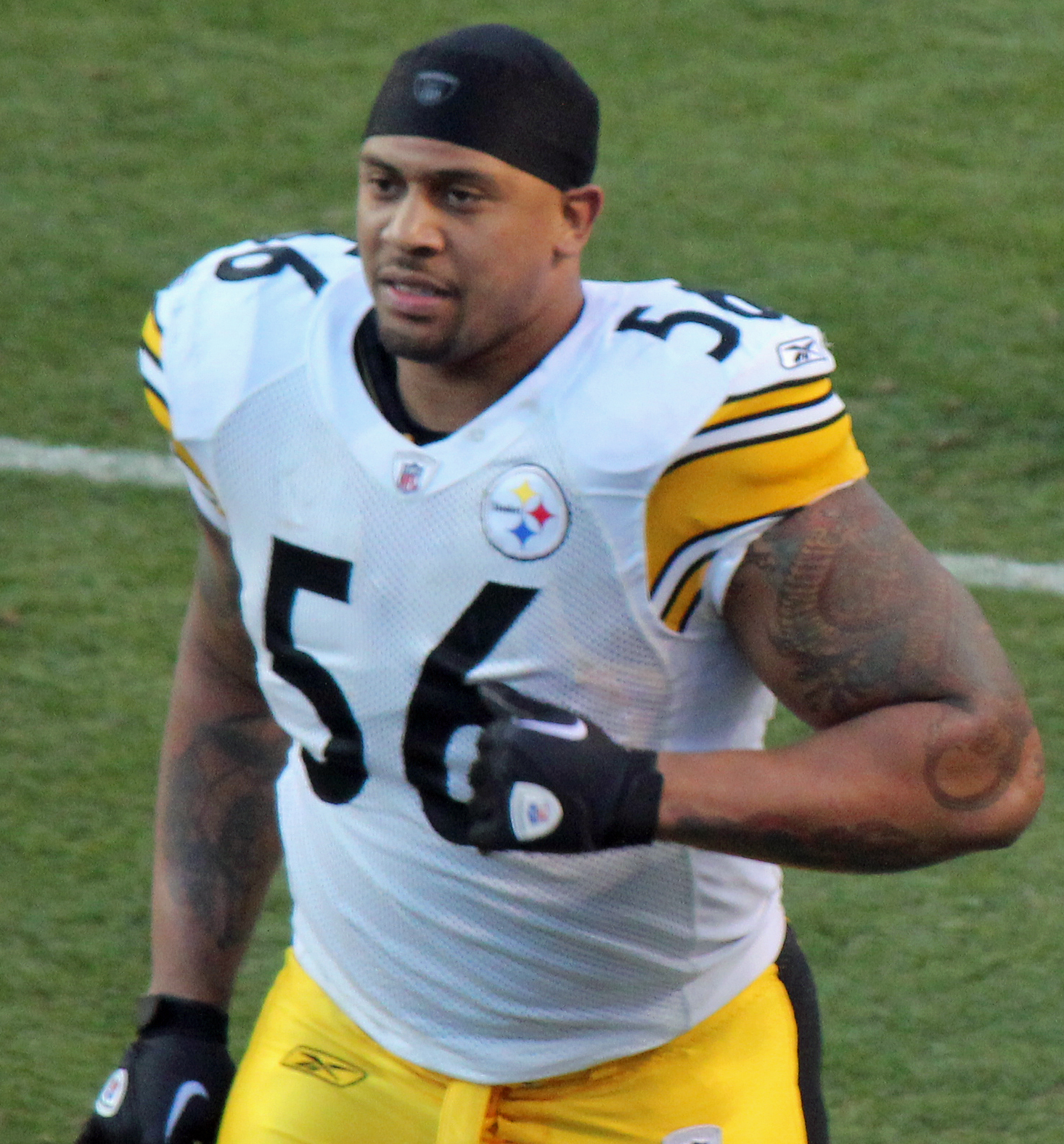
LaMarr Woodley

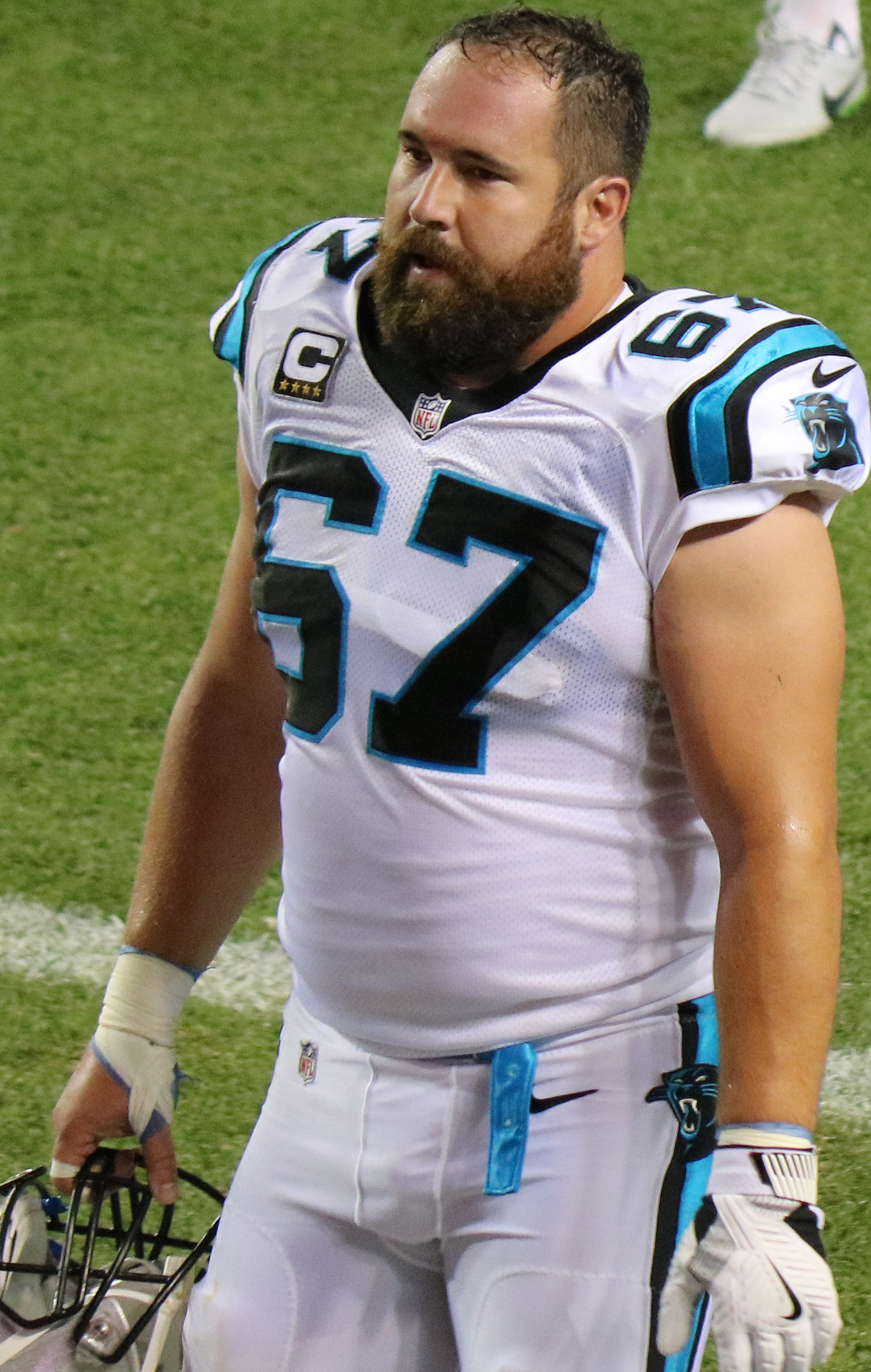
Ryan Kalil

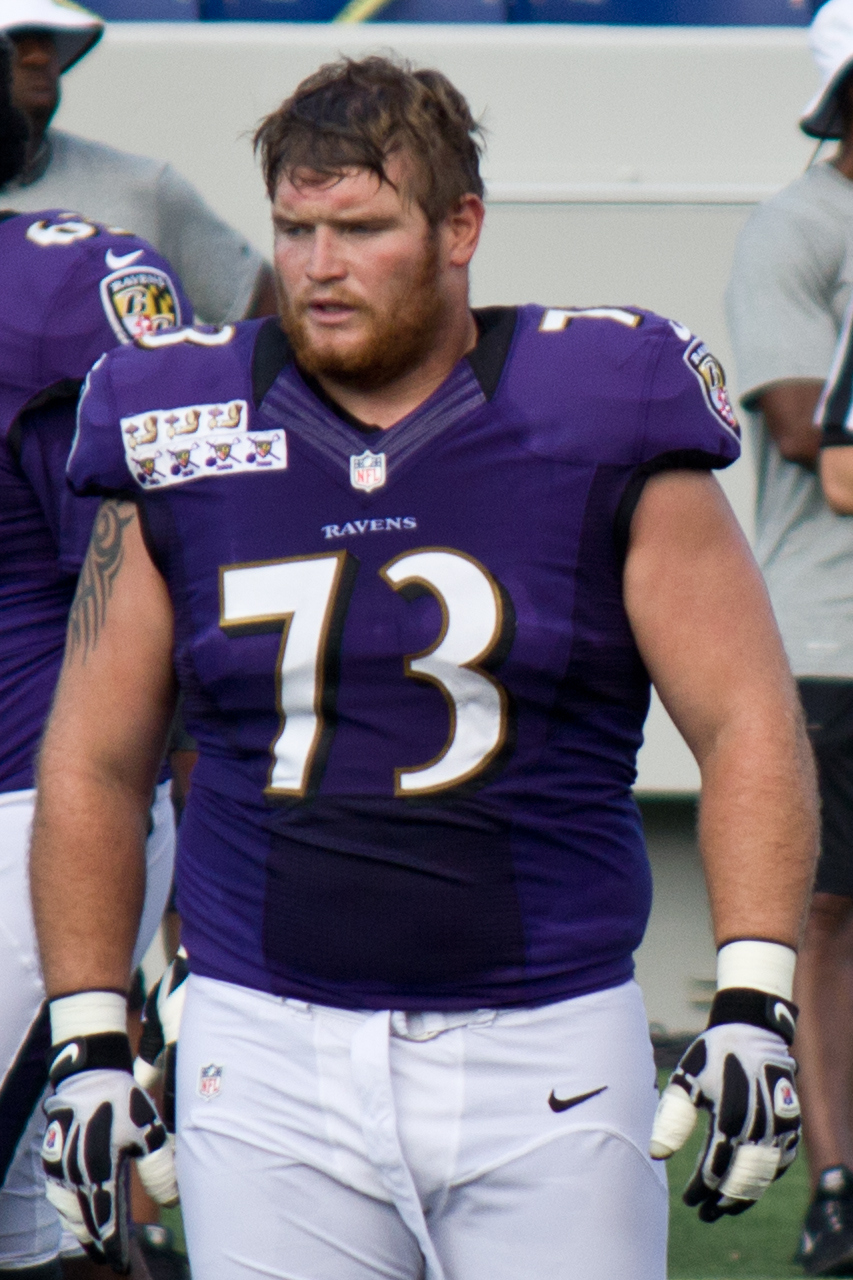
Marshal Yanda

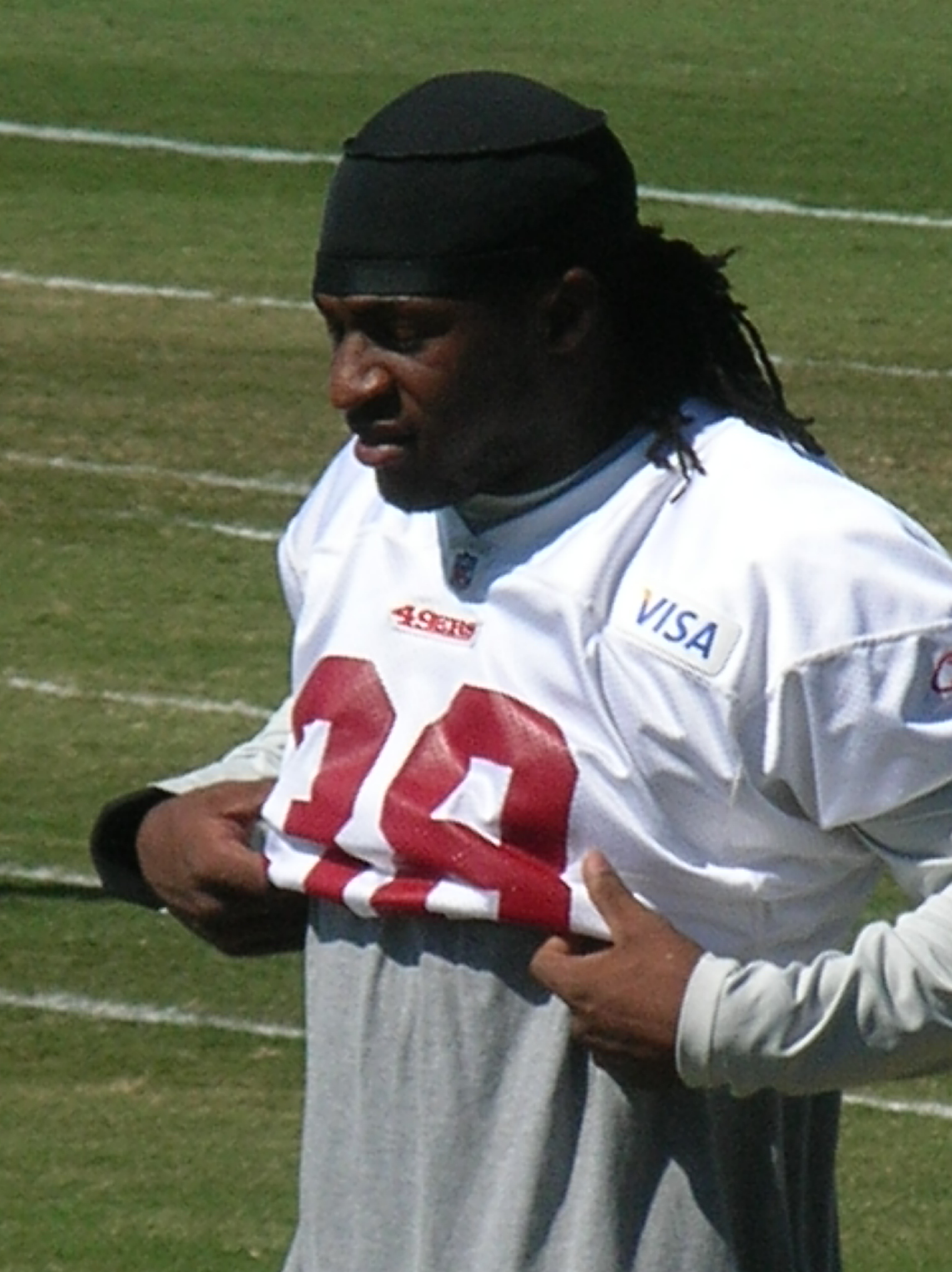
Dashon Goldson

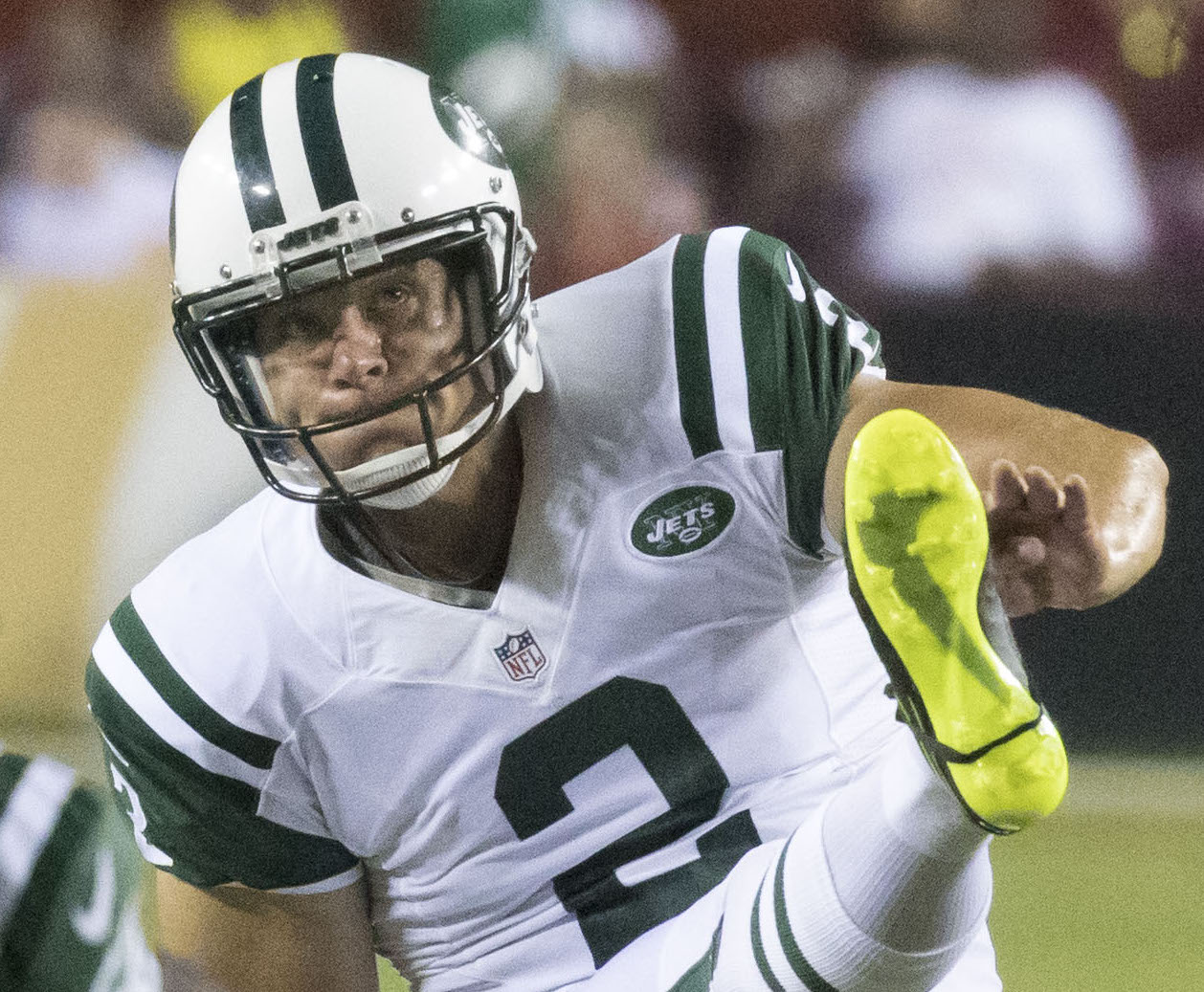
Nick Folk

Rnd.	Pick	Team	Player	Pos.	College	Notes
1	1	Oakland Raiders	JaMarcus Russell	QB	LSU	
1	2	Detroit Lions	Calvin Johnson^{‡}^{†}	WR	Georgia Tech	
1	3	Cleveland Browns	Joe Thomas^{‡}^{†}	T	Wisconsin	
1	4	Tampa Bay Buccaneers	Gaines Adams	DE	Clemson	
1	5	Arizona Cardinals	Levi Brown	T	Penn State	
1	6	Washington Redskins	LaRon Landry ^{†}	S	LSU	
1	7	Minnesota Vikings	Adrian Peterson ^{†}	RB	Oklahoma	
1	8	Atlanta Falcons	Jamaal Anderson	DE	Arkansas	from Houston (Note: No. 8: Houston → Atlanta (PD). Houston traded first- and second-round selections (8th and 39th overall), and a 2008 second-round selection to Atlanta in exchange for a first-round selection (10th overall) and QB Matt Schaub.)
1	9	Miami Dolphins	Ted Ginn Jr.	WR	Ohio State	
1	10	Houston Texans	Amobi Okoye	DT	Louisville	from Atlanta (Note: No. 10: Atlanta → Houston (PD). See Round 1: Houston → Atlanta.)
1	11	San Francisco 49ers	Patrick Willis^{‡}^{†}	LB	Ole Miss	
1	12	Buffalo Bills	Marshawn Lynch ^{†}	RB	California	
1	13	St. Louis Rams	Adam Carriker	DE	Nebraska	
1	14	New York Jets	Darrelle Revis^{‡}^{†}	CB	Pittsburgh	from Carolina (Note: No. 14: Carolina → NY Jets (D). Carolina traded first- and sixth-round selections (14th and 191st overall) to the NY Jets in exchange for first-, second- and fifth-round selections (25th, 59th and 164th overall).)
1	15	Pittsburgh Steelers	Lawrence Timmons ^{†}	LB	Florida State	
1	16	Green Bay Packers	Justin Harrell	DT	Tennessee	
1	17	Denver Broncos	Jarvis Moss	DE	Florida	from Jacksonville (Note: No. 17: Jacksonville → Denver (D). Jacksonville traded a first-round selection (17th overall) to Denver in exchange for first-, third- and sixth-round selections (21st, 86th and 198th overall).)
1	18	Cincinnati Bengals	Leon Hall	CB	Michigan	
1	19	Tennessee Titans	Michael Griffin ^{†}	S	Texas	
1	20	New York Giants	Aaron Ross	CB	Texas	
1	21	Jacksonville Jaguars	Reggie Nelson ^{†}	S	Florida	from Denver (Note: No. 21: Denver → Jacksonville (D). See Round 1: Jacksonville → Denver.)
1	22	Cleveland Browns	Brady Quinn	QB	Notre Dame	from Dallas (Note: No. 22: Dallas → Cleveland (D). Dallas traded a first-round selection (22nd overall) to Cleveland in exchange for a second-round selection (36th overall) and a 2008 first-round selection.)
1	23	Kansas City Chiefs	Dwayne Bowe ^{†}	WR	LSU	
1	24	New England Patriots	Brandon Meriweather ^{†}	S	Miami (FL)	from Seattle (Note: No. 24: Seattle → New England (PD). Seattle traded a first-round selection (24th overall) to New England in exchange for WR Deion Branch.)
1	25	Carolina Panthers	Jon Beason ^{†}	LB	Miami (FL)	from NY Jets (Note: No. 25: NY Jets → Carolina (D). See Round 1: Carolina → NY Jets.)
1	26	Dallas Cowboys	Anthony Spencer ^{†}	LB	Purdue	from Philadelphia (Note: No. 26: Philadelphia → Dallas (D). Philadelphia traded a first-round selection (26th overall) to Dallas in exchange for second-, third- and fifth-round selections (36th, 87th and 159th overall).)
1	27	New Orleans Saints	Robert Meachem	WR	Tennessee	
1	28	San Francisco 49ers	Joe Staley ^{†}	T	Central Michigan	from New England (Note: No. 28: New England → San Francisco (D). New England traded a first-round selection (28th overall) to San Francisco in exchange for a fourth-round selection (110th overall) and a 2008 first-round selection.)
1	29	Baltimore Ravens	Ben Grubbs ^{†}	G	Auburn	
1	30	San Diego Chargers	Craig Davis	WR	LSU	
1	31	Chicago Bears	Greg Olsen ^{†}	TE	Miami (FL)	
1	32	Indianapolis Colts	Anthony Gonzalez	WR	Ohio State	
2	33	Arizona Cardinals	Alan Branch	DT	Michigan	from Oakland (Note: No. 33: Oakland → Arizona (D). Oakland traded a second-round selection (33rd overall) to Arizona in exchange for second- and fourth-round selections (38th and 105th overall).)
2	34	Buffalo Bills	Paul Posluszny ^{†}	LB	Penn State	from Detroit (Note: No. 34: Detroit → Buffalo (D). Detroit traded a second-round selection (34th overall) to Buffalo in exchange for second- and third-round selections (43rd and 74th overall).)
2	35	Tampa Bay Buccaneers	Arron Sears	G	Tennessee	
2	36	Philadelphia Eagles	Kevin Kolb	QB	Houston	from Cleveland via Dallas (Note: No. 36: Cleveland → Dallas → Philadelphia. Multiple trades: Cleveland → Dallas (D). See Round 1: Dallas → Cleveland. Dallas → Philadelphia (D). See Round 1: Philadelphia → Dallas.)
2	37	San Diego Chargers	Eric Weddle ^{†}	S	Utah	from Washington via NY Jets and Chicago (Note: No. 37: Washington → NY Jets → Chicago → San Diego. Multiple trades: Washington → NY Jets (PD). Washington traded a second-round selection (37th overall) to the NY Jets in exchange for a 2006 second-round selection. NY Jets → Chicago (PD). The NY Jets traded a second-round selection (37th overall) to Chicago in exchange for a second-round selection (63rd overall) and RB Thomas Jones. Chicago → San Diego (D). Chicago traded a second-round selection (37th overall) to San Diego in exchange for second-, third- and fifth-round selections (62nd, 93rd and 167th overall), and a 2008 third-round selection.)
2	38	Oakland Raiders	Zach Miller ^{†}	TE	Arizona State	from Arizona (Note: No. 38: Arizona → Oakland (D). See Round 2: Oakland → Arizona.)
2	39	Atlanta Falcons	Justin Blalock	G	Texas	from Houston (Note: No. 39: Houston → Atlanta (PD). See Round 1: Houston → Atlanta.)
2	40	Miami Dolphins	John Beck	QB	BYU	
2	41	Atlanta Falcons	Chris Houston	CB	Arkansas	from Minnesota (Note: No. 41: Minnesota → Atlanta (D). Minnesota traded a second-round selection (41st overall) to Atlanta in exchange for second- and fourth-round selections (44th and 121st overall).)
2	42	Indianapolis Colts	Tony Ugoh	T	Arkansas	from San Francisco (Note: No. 42: San Francisco → Indianapolis (D). San Francisco traded a second-round selection (42nd overall) to Indianapolis in exchange for a fourth-round selection (126th overall) and a 2008 first-round selection.)
2	43	Detroit Lions	Drew Stanton	QB	Michigan State	from Buffalo (Note: No. 43: Buffalo → Detroit (D). See Round 2: Detroit → Buffalo.)
2	44	Minnesota Vikings	Sidney Rice ^{†}	WR	South Carolina	from Atlanta (Note: No. 44: Atlanta → Minnesota (D). See Round 2: Minnesota → Atlanta.)
2	45	Carolina Panthers	Dwayne Jarrett	WR	USC	
2	46	Pittsburgh Steelers	LaMarr Woodley ^{†}	DE	Michigan	
2	47	New York Jets	David Harris	LB	Michigan	from Green Bay (Note: No. 47: Green Bay → NY Jets (D). Green Bay traded second- and seventh-round selections (47th and 235th overall) to the NY Jets in exchange for second-, third- and sixth-round selections (63rd, 89th and 191st overall).)
2	48	Jacksonville Jaguars	Justin Durant	LB	Hampton	
2	49	Cincinnati Bengals	Kenny Irons	RB	Auburn	
2	50	Tennessee Titans	Chris Henry	RB	Arizona	
2	51	New York Giants	Steve Smith ^{†}	WR	USC	
2	52	St. Louis Rams	Brian Leonard	RB	Rutgers	
2	53	Cleveland Browns	Eric Wright	CB	UNLV	from Dallas (Note: No. 53: Dallas → Cleveland (D). Dallas traded second- and sixth-round selections (53rd and 195th overall) to Cleveland in exchange for third-, fourth- and sixth-round selections (67th, 103rd and 178th overall).)
2	54	Kansas City Chiefs	Turk McBride	DE	Tennessee	
2	55	Seattle Seahawks	Josh Wilson	CB	Maryland	
2	56	Denver Broncos	Tim Crowder	DE	Texas	
2	57	Philadelphia Eagles	Victor Abiamiri	DE	Notre Dame	
2	58	Detroit Lions	Ikaika Alama-Francis	DE	Hawaii	from New Orleans (Note: No. 58: New Orleans → Detroit (D). New Orleans traded a second-round selection (58th overall) to Detroit in exchange for third- and fifth-round selections (66th and 145th overall).)
2	59	Carolina Panthers	Ryan Kalil ^{†}	C	USC	from NY Jets (Note: No. 59: NY Jets → Carolina (D). See Round 1: Carolina → NY Jets.)
2	60	Miami Dolphins	Samson Satele	C	Hawaii	from New England (Note: No. 60: New England → Miami (PD). New England traded second- and seventh-round selections (60th and 238th overall) to Miami in exchange for WR Wes Welker.)
2	61	Detroit Lions	Gerald Alexander	S	Boise State	from Baltimore (Note: No. 61: Baltimore → Detroit (D). Baltimore traded a second-round selection (61st overall) to Detroit in exchange for third- and fourth-round selections (74th and 101st overall).)
2	62	Chicago Bears	Dan Bazuin	DE	Central Michigan	from San Diego (Note: No. 62: San Diego → Chicago (D). See Round 2: Chicago → San Diego.)
2	63	Green Bay Packers	Brandon Jackson	RB	Nebraska	from Chicago via NY Jets (Note: No. 63: Chicago → NY Jets → Green Bay. Multiple trades: Chicago → NY Jets (PD). See Round 2: NY Jets → Chicago. NY Jets → Green Bay (D). See Round 2: Green Bay → NY Jets.)
2	64	Tampa Bay Buccaneers	Sabby Piscitelli	S	Oregon State	from Indianapolis (Note: No. 64: Indianapolis → Tampa Bay (PD). Indianapolis traded a second-round selection (64th overall) to Tampa Bay in exchange for DT Booger McFarland.)
3	65	Oakland Raiders	Quentin Moses	DE	Georgia	
3	66	New Orleans Saints	Usama Young	CB	Kent State	from Detroit (Note: No. 66: Detroit → New Orleans (D). See Round 2: New Orleans → Detroit.)
3	67	Dallas Cowboys	James Marten	T	Boston College	from Cleveland (Note: No. 67: Cleveland → Dallas (D). See Round 2: Dallas → Cleveland.)
3	68	Tampa Bay Buccaneers	Quincy Black	LB	New Mexico	
3	69	Arizona Cardinals	Buster Davis	LB	Florida State	
3	70	Denver Broncos	Ryan Harris	T	Notre Dame	from Washington (Note: No. 70: Washington → Denver (PD). Washington traded a third-round selection (70th overall) to Denver in a three-way trade with Atlanta: Washington received RB T. J. Duckett and Atlanta received WR Ashley Lelie.)
3	71	Miami Dolphins	Lorenzo Booker	RB	Florida State	
3	72	Minnesota Vikings	Marcus McCauley	CB	Fresno State	
3	73	Houston Texans	Jacoby Jones ^{†}	WR	Lane	
3	74	Baltimore Ravens	Yamon Figurs	WR	Kansas State	from Buffalo via Detroit (Note: No. 74: Buffalo → Detroit → Baltimore. Multiple trades: Buffalo → Detroit (D). See Round 2: Detroit → Buffalo. Detroit → Baltimore (D). See Round 2: Baltimore → Detroit.)
3	75	Atlanta Falcons	Laurent Robinson	WR	Illinois State	
3	76	San Francisco 49ers	Jason Hill	WR	Washington State	
3	77	Pittsburgh Steelers	Matt Spaeth	TE	Minnesota	
3	78	Green Bay Packers	James Jones	WR	San Jose State	
3	79	Jacksonville Jaguars	Mike Sims-Walker	WR	UCF	
3	80	Tennessee Titans	Paul Williams	WR	Fresno State	
3	–	Cincinnati Bengals	selection forfeited because of use of 3rd round selection in 2006 supplemental draft (Note: Cincinnati forfeited their third-round selection to select LB Ahmad Brooks in the 2006 supplemental draft.)			
3	81	New York Giants	Jay Alford	DT	Penn State	
3	82	Kansas City Chiefs	DeMarcus Tyler	DT	NC State	from St. Louis (Note: No. 82: St. Louis → Kansas City (PD). St. Louis traded third- and fifth-round selections (82nd and 148th overall) to Kansas City in exchange for a third-round selection (84th overall) and WR/RS Dante Hall.)
3	83	Carolina Panthers	Charles Johnson	DE	Georgia	
3	84	St. Louis Rams	Jonathan Wade	CB	Tennessee	from Kansas City (Note: No. 84: Kansas City → St. Louis (PD). See Round 3: St. Louis → Kansas City.)
3	85	Seattle Seahawks	Brandon Mebane	DT	California	
3	86	Baltimore Ravens	Marshal Yanda ^{†}	T	Iowa	from Denver via Jacksonville (Note: No. 86: Denver → Jacksonville → Baltimore. Multiple trades: Denver → Jacksonville (D). See Round 1: Jacksonville → Denver. Jacksonville → Baltimore (D). Jacksonville traded a third-round selection (86th overall) to Baltimore in exchange for fourth-, fifth- and sixth-round selections (101st, 166th and 203rd overall).)
3	87	Philadelphia Eagles	Stewart Bradley	LB	Nebraska	from Dallas (Note: No. 87: Dallas → Philadelphia (D). See Round 1: Philadelphia → Dallas.)
3	88	New Orleans Saints	Andy Alleman	G	Akron	
3	89	Green Bay Packers	Aaron Rouse	S	Virginia Tech	from NY Jets (Note: No. 89: NY Jets → Green Bay (D). See Round 2: Green Bay → NY Jets.)
3	90	Philadelphia Eagles	Tony Hunt	RB	Penn State	
3	91	Oakland Raiders	Mario Henderson	T	Florida State	from New England (Note: No. 91: New England → Oakland (D). New England traded a third-round selection (91st overall) to Oakland in exchange for a seventh-round selection (211th overall) and a 2008 third-round selection.)
3	92	Buffalo Bills	Trent Edwards	QB	Stanford	from Baltimore (Note: No. 92: Baltimore → Buffalo (PD). Baltimore traded third- and seventh-round selections (92nd and 239th overall), and a 2008 third-round selection to Buffalo in exchange for RB Willis McGahee.)
3	93	Chicago Bears	Garrett Wolfe	RB	Northern Illinois	from San Diego (Note: No. 93: San Diego → Chicago (D). See Round 2: Chicago → San Diego.)
3	94	Chicago Bears	Michael Okwo	LB	Stanford	
3	95	Indianapolis Colts	Dante Hughes	CB	California	
3*	96	San Diego Chargers	Anthony Waters	LB	Clemson	
3*	97	San Francisco 49ers	Ray McDonald	DE	Florida	
3*	98	Indianapolis Colts	Quinn Pitcock	DT	Ohio State	
3*	99	Oakland Raiders	Johnnie Lee Higgins	WR	UTEP	
4	100	Oakland Raiders	Michael Bush	RB	Louisville	
4	101	Jacksonville Jaguars	Adam Podlesh	P	Maryland	from Detroit via Baltimore (Note: No. 101: Detroit → Baltimore → Jacksonville. Multiple trades: Detroit → Baltimore (D). See Round 2: Baltimore → Detroit. Baltimore → Jacksonville (D). See Round 3: Jacksonville → Baltimore.)
4	102	Minnesota Vikings	Brian Robison	DE	Texas	from Tampa Bay (Note: No. 102: Tampa Bay → Minnesota (D). Tampa Bay traded a fourth-round selection (102nd overall) to Minnesota in exchange for fourth- and sixth-round selections (106th and 182nd overall).)
4	103	Dallas Cowboys	Isaiah Stanback	QB	Washington	from Cleveland (Note: No. 103: Cleveland → Dallas (D). See Round 2: Dallas → Cleveland.)
4	104	San Francisco 49ers	Jay Moore	DE	Nebraska	from Washington (Note: No. 104: Washington → San Francisco (PD). Washington traded a fourth-round selection (104th overall) and a 2006 third-round selection to San Francisco in exchange for WR Brandon Lloyd.)
4	105	Detroit Lions	A. J. Davis	CB	NC State	from Arizona via Oakland (Note: No. 105: Arizona → Oakland → Detroit. Multiple trades: Arizona → Oakland (D). See Round 2: Oakland → Arizona. Oakland → Detroit (D). Oakland traded a fourth-round selection (105th overall) to Detroit in exchange for WR Mike Williams and QB Josh McCown.)
4	106	Tampa Bay Buccaneers	Tanard Jackson	S	Syracuse	from Minnesota (Note: No. 106: Minnesota → Tampa Bay (D). See Round 4: Tampa Bay → Minnesota.)
4	107	New Orleans Saints	Antonio Pittman	RB	Ohio State	from Houston (Note: No. 107: Houston → New Orleans (D). Houston traded a fourth-round selection (107th overall) to New Orleans in exchange for fourth- and fifth-round selections (123rd and 163rd overall).)
4	108	Miami Dolphins	Paul Soliai ^{†}	DT	Utah	
4	109	Atlanta Falcons	Stephen Nicholas	LB	South Florida	
4	110	Oakland Raiders	John Bowie	CB	Cincinnati	from San Francisco via New England (Note: No. 110: San Francisco → New England → Oakland. Multiple trades: San Francisco → New England (D). See Round 1: New England → San Francisco. New England → Oakland (D). New England traded a fourth-round selection (110th overall) to Oakland in exchange for WR Randy Moss.)
4	111	Buffalo Bills	Dwayne Wright	RB	Fresno State	
4	112	Pittsburgh Steelers	Daniel Sepulveda	P	Baylor	from Green Bay (Note: No. 112: Green Bay → Pittsburgh (D). Green Bay traded a fourth-round selection (112th overall) to Pittsburgh in exchange for fourth- and sixth-round selections (119th and 192nd overall).)
4	113	Jacksonville Jaguars	Brian Smith	LB	Missouri	
4	114	Cincinnati Bengals	Marvin White	S	TCU	
4	115	Tennessee Titans	Leroy Harris	C	NC State	
4	116	New York Giants	Zak DeOssie ^{†}	LB	Brown	
4	117	Detroit Lions	Manuel Ramírez	G	Texas Tech	from St. Louis (Note: No. 117: St. Louis → Detroit (D). St. Louis traded a fourth-round selection (117th overall) to Detroit in exchange for two fifth-round selections (139th and 154th overall).)
4	118	Carolina Panthers	Ryne Robinson	WR	Miami (OH)	
4	119	Green Bay Packers	Allen Barbre	T	Missouri Southern	from Pittsburgh (Note: No. 119: Pittsburgh → Green Bay (D). See Round 4: Green Bay → Pittsburgh.)
4	120	Seattle Seahawks	Baraka Atkins	DE	Miami (FL)	
4	121	Denver Broncos	Marcus Thomas	DT	Florida	from Denver via Atlanta and Minnesota (Note: No. 121: Denver → Atlanta → Minnesota → Denver. Multiple trades: Denver → Atlanta (PD). Denver traded a fourth-round selection, and 2006 first- and third-round selections to Atlanta in exchange for a 2006 first-round selection. Atlanta → Minnesota (D). See Round 2: Minnesota → Atlanta. Minnesota → Denver (D). Minnesota traded a fourth-round selection (121st overall) to Denver in exchange for sixth- and seventh-round selections (176th and 233rd overall), and a 2008 third-round selection.)
4	122	Dallas Cowboys	Doug Free	T	Northern Illinois	
4	123	Houston Texans	Fred Bennett	CB	South Carolina	from Kansas City via New Orleans (Note: No. 123: Kansas City → New Orleans → Houston. Multiple trades: Kansas City → New Orleans (PD). Kansas City traded a fourth-round selection (123rd overall) to New Orleans in exchange for RB Michael Bennett. New Orleans → Houston (D). See Round 4: Houston → New Orleans.)
4	124	Seattle Seahawks	Mansfield Wrotto	G	Georgia Tech	from NY Jets via San Francisco (Note: No. 124: NY Jets → San Francisco → Seattle. Multiple trades: NY Jets → San Francisco (PD). The NY Jets traded a fourth-round selection (124th overall) to San Francisco in exchange for RB Kevan Barlow. San Francisco → Seattle (D). San Francisco traded a fourth-round selection (124th overall) to Seattle in exchange for WR Darrell Jackson.)
4	125	New Orleans Saints	Jermon Bushrod ^{†}	T	Towson	from Philadelphia (Note: No. 125: Philadelphia → New Orleans (PD). Philadelphia traded a fourth-round selection to New Orleans in exchange for WR Donté Stallworth. Had Philadelphia re-signed Stallworth before March 2, 2007 (the date when free agency began), New Orleans would have instead received Philadelphia's second-round selection.)
4	126	San Francisco 49ers	Dashon Goldson ^{†}	S	Washington	from New Orleans via Indianapolis (Note: No. 126: New Orleans → Indianapolis → San Francisco. Multiple trades: New Orleans → Indianapolis (PD). Indianapolis received this selection from New Orleans as compensation for New Orleans' signing of restricted free agent CB Jason David. Indianapolis → San Francisco (D). See Round 2: San Francisco → Indianapolis.)
4	127	New England Patriots	Kareem Brown	DT	Miami (FL)	
4	128	Tennessee Titans	Chris Davis	WR	Florida State	from Baltimore (Note: No. 128: Baltimore → Tennessee (PD). Baltimore traded a fourth-round selection (128th overall) to Tennessee in exchange for QB Steve McNair.)
4	129	San Diego Chargers	Scott Chandler	TE	Iowa	
4	130	Chicago Bears	Josh Beekman	G	Boston College	
4	131	Indianapolis Colts	Brannon Condren	S	Troy	
4*	132	Pittsburgh Steelers	Ryan McBean	DT	Oklahoma State	
4*	133	Atlanta Falcons	Martrez Milner	TE	Georgia	
4*	134	Baltimore Ravens	Antwan Barnes	LB	FIU	
4*	135	San Francisco 49ers	Joe Cohen	DE	Florida	
4*	136	Indianapolis Colts	Clint Session	LB	Pittsburgh	
4*	137	Baltimore Ravens	Le'Ron McClain ^{†}	FB	Alabama	
5	138	Oakland Raiders	Jay Richardson	DE	Ohio State	
5	139	St. Louis Rams	Dustin Fry	C	Clemson	from Detroit (Note: No. 139: Detroit → St. Louis (D). See Round 4: St. Louis → Detroit.)
5	140	Cleveland Browns	Brandon McDonald	CB	Memphis	
5	141	Tampa Bay Buccaneers	Greg Peterson	DE	North Carolina Central	
5	142	Arizona Cardinals	Steve Breaston	WR	Michigan	
5	143	Washington Redskins	Dallas Sartz	LB	USC	
5	144	Houston Texans	Brandon Harrison	S	Stanford	
5	145	New Orleans Saints	David Jones	CB	Wingate	from Miami via Detroit (Note: No. 145: Miami → Detroit → New Orleans. Multiple trades: Miami → Detroit (PD). Miami traded a fifth-round selection (145th overall) to Detroit in exchange for QB Joey Harrington. Detroit → New Orleans (D). See Round 2: New Orleans → Detroit.)
5	146	Minnesota Vikings	Aundrae Allison	WR	East Carolina	
5	147	San Francisco 49ers	Tarell Brown	CB	Texas	
5	148	Kansas City Chiefs	Kolby Smith	RB	Louisville	from Buffalo via St. Louis (Note: No. 148: Buffalo → St. Louis → Kansas City. Multiple trades: Buffalo → St. Louis (PD). Buffalo traded a fifth-round selection to St. Louis in exchange for DT Anthony Hargrove. St. Louis → Kansas City (PD). See Round 3: St. Louis → Kansas City.)
5	149	Jacksonville Jaguars	Uche Nwaneri	G	Purdue	from Atlanta] (Note: No. 149: Atlanta → Jacksonville (D). Atlanta traded a fifth-round selection (149th overall) to Jacksonville in exchange for three sixth-round selections (194th, 198th and 203rd overall).)
5	150	Jacksonville Jaguars	Josh Gattis	S	Wake Forest	
5	151	Cincinnati Bengals	Jeff Rowe	QB	Nevada	
5	152	Tennessee Titans	Antonio Johnson	DT	Mississippi State	
5	153	New York Giants	Kevin Boss	TE	Western Oregon	
5	154	St. Louis Rams	Clifton Ryan	DT	Michigan State	from St. Louis via Detroit (Note: No. 154: St. Louis → Detroit → St. Louis. Multiple trades: St. Louis → Detroit (PD). St. Louis traded a fifth-round selection (154th overall) to Detroit in exchange for DE James Hall. Detroit → St. Louis (D). See Round 4: St. Louis → Detroit.)
5	155	Carolina Panthers	Dante Rosario	TE	Oregon	
5	156	Pittsburgh Steelers	Cameron Stephenson	G	Rutgers	
5	157	Green Bay Packers	David Clowney	WR	Virginia Tech	
5	158	Detroit Lions	Johnny Baldwin	LB	Alabama A&M	from Denver (Note: No. 158: Denver → Detroit (PD). Denver traded a fifth-round selection (158th overall), RB Tatum Bell and OT George Foster to Detroit in exchange for a sixth-round selection (176th overall) and CB Dré Bly.)
5	159	Philadelphia Eagles	C. J. Gaddis	CB	Clemson	from Dallas (Note: No. 159: Dallas → Philadelphia (D). See Round 1: Philadelphia → Dallas.)
5	160	Kansas City Chiefs	Justin Medlock	K	UCLA	
5	161	Seattle Seahawks	Will Herring	LB	Auburn	
5	162	Philadelphia Eagles	Brent Celek	TE	Cincinnati	
5	163	Houston Texans	Brandon Frye	T	Virginia Tech	from New Orleans (Note: No. 163: New Orleans → Houston (D). See Round 4: Houston → New Orleans.)
5	164	Carolina Panthers	Tim Shaw	LB	Penn State	from NY Jets (Note: No. 164: NY Jets → Carolina (D). See Round 1: Carolina → NY Jets.)
5	165	Oakland Raiders	Eric Frampton	S	Washington State	from New England (Note: No. 165: New England → Oakland (PD). New England traded a fifth-round selection (165th overall) to Oakland in exchange for WR Doug Gabriel.)
5	166	Jacksonville Jaguars	Derek Landri	DT	Notre Dame	from Baltimore (Note: No. 166: Baltimore → Jacksonville (D). See Round 3: Jacksonville → Baltimore.)
5	167	Chicago Bears	Kevin Payne	S	Louisiana–Monroe	from San Diego (Note: No. 167: San Diego → Chicago (D). See Round 2: Chicago → San Diego.)
5	168	Chicago Bears	Corey Graham ^{†}	CB	New Hampshire	
5	169	Indianapolis Colts	Roy Hall	WR	Ohio State	
5*	170	Pittsburgh Steelers	William Gay	CB	Louisville	
5*	171	New England Patriots	Clint Oldenburg	T	Colorado State	
5*	172	San Diego Chargers	Legedu Naanee	WR	Boise State	
5*	173	Indianapolis Colts	Michael Coe	CB	Alabama State	
5*	174	Baltimore Ravens	Troy Smith	QB	Ohio State	2006 Heisman Trophy winner
6	175	Oakland Raiders	Oren O'Neal	FB	Arkansas State	
6	176	Minnesota Vikings	Rufus Alexander	LB	Oklahoma	from Detroit via Denver (Note: No. 176: Detroit → Denver → Minnesota. Multiple trades: Detroit → Denver (PD). See Round 5: Denver → Detroit. Denver → Minnesota (D). See Round 4: Minnesota → Denver.)
6	177	New York Jets	Jacob Bender	T	Nicholls State	from Tampa Bay (Note: No. 177: Tampa Bay → NY Jets (PD). Tampa Bay Buccaneers traded a sixth-round selection (177th overall) to the NY Jets in exchange for TE Doug Jolley.)
6	178	Dallas Cowboys	Nick Folk ^{†}	K	Arizona	from Cleveland (Note: No. 178: Cleveland → Dallas (D). See Round 2: Dallas → Cleveland.)
6	179	Washington Redskins	H. B. Blades	LB	Pittsburgh	
6	180	New England Patriots	Justin Rogers	DE	SMU	from Arizona (Note: No. 180: Arizona → New England (PD). Arizona traded a sixth-round selection (180th overall) to New England in exchange for OT Brandon Gorin.)
6	181	Miami Dolphins	Reagan Maui'a	FB	Hawaii	
6	182	Tampa Bay Buccaneers	Adam Hayward	LB	Portland State	from Minnesota (Note: No. 182: Minnesota → Tampa Bay (D). See Round 4: Tampa Bay → Minnesota.)
6	183	Houston Texans	Kasey Studdard	G	Texas	
6	184	Buffalo Bills	John Wendling	S	Wyoming	
6	185	Atlanta Falcons	Trey Lewis	DT	Washburn	
6	186	San Francisco 49ers	Thomas Clayton	RB	Kansas State	
6	187	Cincinnati Bengals	Matt Toeaina	DT	Oregon	
6	188	Tennessee Titans	Joel Filani	WR	Texas Tech	
6	189	New York Giants	Adam Koets	T	Oregon State	
6	190	St. Louis Rams	Ken Shackleford	T	Georgia	
6	191	Green Bay Packers	Korey Hall	LB	Boise State	from Carolina via NY Jets (Note: No. 191: Carolina → NY Jets → Green Bay. Multiple trades: Carolina → NY Jets (D). See Round 1: Carolina → NY Jets. NY Jets → Green Bay (D). See Round 2: NY Jets → Green Bay.)
6	192	Green Bay Packers	Desmond Bishop	LB	California	from Pittsburgh (Note: No. 192: Pittsburgh → Green Bay (D). See Round 4: Green Bay → Pittsburgh.)
6	193	Green Bay Packers	Mason Crosby	K	Colorado	
6	194	Atlanta Falcons	David Irons	CB	Auburn	from Jacksonville (Note: No. 194: Jacksonville → Atlanta (D). See Round 5: Atlanta → Jacksonville.)
6	195	Dallas Cowboys	Deon Anderson	FB	Connecticut	from Dallas via Cleveland (Note: No. 195: Dallas → Cleveland → Dallas. Multiple trades: Dallas → Cleveland (D). See Round 2: Dallas → Cleveland. Cleveland → Dallas (D). Cleveland traded a sixth-round selection (195th overall) to Dallas in exchange for sixth- and seventh-round selections (200th and 234th overall).)
6	196	Kansas City Chiefs	Herbert Taylor	T	TCU	
6	197	Seattle Seahawks	Courtney Taylor	WR	Auburn	
6	198	Atlanta Falcons	Doug Datish	C	Ohio State	from Denver via Jacksonville (Note: No. 198: Denver → Jacksonville → Atlanta. Multiple trades: Denver → Jacksonville (D). See Round 2: Jacksonville → Denver. Jacksonville → Atlanta (D). See Round 5: Atlanta → Jaguars.) (Note: Denver had traded this selection to Miami for defensive tackle Dan Wilkinson, but Wilkinson failed to show for a physical and the trade was voided.)
6	199	Miami Dolphins	Drew Mormino	C	Central Michigan	from New Orleans (Note: No. 199: New Orleans → Miami (PD). New Orleans traded a sixth-round selection (199th overall) to Miami in exchange for K Olindo Mare.)
6	200	Cleveland Browns	Melila Purcell	DE	Hawaii	from NY Jets via Dallas (Note: No. 200: NY Jets → Dallas → Cleveland. Multiple trades: NY Jets → Dallas (PD). The NY Jets traded a sixth-round selection (200th overall) to Dallas in exchange for DB Pete Hunter. Dallas → Cleveland (D). See Round 6: Cleveland → Dallas.)
6	201	Philadelphia Eagles	Rashad Barksdale	CB	Albany	
6	202	New England Patriots	Mike Richardson	CB	Notre Dame	
6	203	Atlanta Falcons	Daren Stone	S	Maine	from Baltimore via Jacksonville (Note: No. 203: Baltimore → Jacksonville → Atlanta. Multiple trades: Baltimore → Jacksonville (D). See Round 1: Jacksonville → Baltimore. Jacksonville → Atlanta (D). See Round 2: Atlanta → Jacksonville.)
6	204	Tennessee Titans	Jacob Ford	DE	Central Arkansas	from San Diego (Note: No. 204: San Diego → Tennessee (PD). San Diego traded a sixth-round selection (204th overall) to Tennessee in exchange for QB Billy Volek.)
6	205	Washington Redskins	Jordan Palmer	QB	UTEP	from Chicago (Note: No. 205: Chicago → Washington (PD). Chicago traded a sixth-round selection (205th overall) to Washington in exchange for S Adam Archuleta.)
6	206	Tennessee Titans	Ryan Smith	CB	Florida	from Indianapolis (Note: No. 206: Indianapolis → Tennessee (PD). Indianapolis traded a sixth-round selection (206th overall) to Tennessee in exchange for a 2006 seventh-round selection.)
6*	207	Baltimore Ravens	Prescott Burgess	LB	Michigan	
6*	208	New England Patriots	Justise Hairston	RB	Central Connecticut	
6*	209	New England Patriots	Corey Hilliard	T	Oklahoma State	
6*	210	Seattle Seahawks	Jordan Kent	WR	Oregon	
7	211	New England Patriots	Oscar Lua	LB	USC	from Oakland (Note: No. 211: Oakland → New England (D). See Round 3: New England → Oakland.)
7	212	Dallas Cowboys	Courtney Brown	CB	Cal Poly	from Detroit via NY Jets (Note: No. 212: Detroit → NY Jets → Dallas. Multiple trades: Detroit → NY Jets (PD). Detroit traded a seventh-round selection (212th overall) to the NY Jets in exchange for S Jon McGraw. NY Jets → Dallas (PD). The NY Jets traded a seventh-round selection (212th overall) to Dallas in exchange for TE Sean Ryan.)
7	213	Cleveland Browns	Chase Pittman	DE	LSU	
7	214	Tampa Bay Buccaneers	Chris Denman	T	Fresno State	
7	215	Arizona Cardinals	Ben Patrick	TE	Delaware	
7	216	Washington Redskins	Tyler Ecker	TE	Michigan	
7	217	Minnesota Vikings	Tyler Thigpen	QB	Coastal Carolina	
7	218	Houston Texans	Zac Diles	LB	Kansas State	
7	219	Miami Dolphins	Kelvin Smith	LB	Syracuse	
7	220	New Orleans Saints	Marvin Mitchell	LB	Tennessee	from Atlanta (Note: No. 220: Atlanta → New Orleans (PD). Atlanta traded a seventh-round selection (220th overall) and S Bryan Scott to New Orleans in exchange for OT Wayne Gandy.)
7	221	Chicago Bears	Trumaine McBride	CB	Ole Miss	from San Francisco via Cleveland (Note: No. 221: San Francisco → Cleveland → Chicago. Multiple trades: San Francisco → Cleveland (PD). San Francisco traded a seventh-round selection (221st overall) and QB Ken Dorsey to Cleveland in exchange for QB Trent Dilfer. Cleveland → Chicago (PD). Cleveland traded a seventh-round selection (221st overall) to Chicago in exchange for OL Lennie Friedman.)
7	222	Buffalo Bills	Derek Schouman	TE	Boise State	
7	223	Tennessee Titans	Mike Otto	T	Purdue	
7	224	New York Giants	Michael Johnson	S	Arizona	
7	225	Miami Dolphins	Brandon Fields ^{†}	P	Michigan State	from St. Louis (Note: Miami received a seventh-round selection (225th overall) in exchange for St. Louis signing restricted free agent P Donnie Jones.)
7	226	Carolina Panthers	C. J. Wilson	CB	Baylor	
7	227	Pittsburgh Steelers	Dallas Baker	WR	Florida	
7	228	Green Bay Packers	DeShawn Wynn	RB	Florida	
7	229	Jacksonville Jaguars	John Broussard	WR	San Jose State	
7	230	Cincinnati Bengals	Dan Santucci	G	Notre Dame	
7	231	Kansas City Chiefs	Michael Allan	TE	Whitworth	
7	232	Seattle Seahawks	Steve Vallos	G	Wake Forest	
7	233	Minnesota Vikings	Chandler Williams	WR	FIU	from Denver (Note: No. 233: Denver → Minnesota (D). See Round 4: Minnesota → Denver.)
7	234	Cleveland Browns	Syndric Steptoe	WR	Arizona	from Dallas (Note: No. 234: Dallas → Cleveland (D). See Round 6: Cleveland → Dallas.)
7	235	New York Jets	Chansi Stuckey	WR	Clemson	from NY Jets via Green Bay (Note: No. 235: NY Jets → Green Bay → NY Jets. Multiple trades: NY Jets → Green Bay (PD). The NY Jets traded a seventh-round selection (235th overall) to Green Bay in exchange for OL Steve Morley. Green Bay → NY Jets (D). See Round 2: Green Bay → NY Jets.)
7	236	Philadelphia Eagles	Nate Ilaoa	RB	Hawaii	
7	237	Dallas Cowboys	Alan Ball	CB	Illinois	from New Orleans (Note: No. 237: New Orleans → Dallas (PD). New Orleans traded a seventh-round selection (237th overall) to Dallas in exchange for LB Scott Shanle.)
7	238	Miami Dolphins	Abraham Wright	DE	Colorado	from New England (Note: No. 238: New England → Miami (PD). See Round 2: New England → Miami.)
7	239	Buffalo Bills	C. J. Ah You	DE	Oklahoma	from Baltimore (Note: No. 239: Baltimore → Buffalo (PD). See Round 3: Baltimore → Buffalo.)
7	240	San Diego Chargers	Brandon Siler	LB	Florida	
7	241	Chicago Bears	Aaron Brant	T	Iowa State	
7	242	Indianapolis Colts	Keyunta Dawson	LB	Texas Tech	
7*	243	Green Bay Packers	Clark Harris ^{†}	TE	Rutgers	
7*	244	Atlanta Falcons	Jason Snelling	FB	Virginia	
7*	245	Tampa Bay Buccaneers	Marcus Hamilton	CB	Virginia	
7*	246	Tampa Bay Buccaneers	Kenneth Darby	RB	Alabama	
7*	247	New England Patriots	Mike Elgin	C	Iowa	
7*	248	St. Louis Rams	Keith Jackson	DT	Arkansas	
7*	249	St. Louis Rams	Derek Stanley	WR	Wisconsin–Whitewater	
7*	250	New York Giants	Ahmad Bradshaw	RB	Marshall	
7*	251	Jacksonville Jaguars	Chad Nkang	LB	Elon	
7*	252	Jacksonville Jaguars	Andrew Carnahan	T	Arizona State	
7*	253	Cincinnati Bengals	Chinedum Ndukwe	S	Notre Dame	
7^	254	Oakland Raiders	Jonathan Holland	WR	Louisiana Tech	
7^	255	Detroit Lions	Ramzee Robinson	CB	Alabama	(Note: This last selection is commonly referred to as Mr. Irrelevant.)

== Supplemental draft selections ==
For each player selected in the supplemental draft, the selecting team forfeits its selection in that round in the draft of the following season.

Rnd.	Pick	Team	Player	Pos.	College	Notes
4	–	San Diego Chargers	Paul Oliver	S	Georgia	
5	–	Baltimore Ravens	Jared Gaither	T	Maryland	

== Notable undrafted players ==
†	= Pro Bowler (Note: Players are identified as a Pro Bowler if they were selected for the Pro Bowl at any time in their career.)

Original NFL team	Player	Pos.	College	Notes
Arizona Cardinals	Michael Adams	CB	Louisiana–Lafayette	
Arizona Cardinals	Tim Castille	FB	Alabama	
Arizona Cardinals	Lyle Sendlein	C	Texas	
Atlanta Falcons	Eric Weems ^{†}	WR	Bethune–Cookman	
Baltimore Ravens	Edgar Jones	LB	Southeast Missouri State	
Baltimore Ravens	Terrell Maze	CB	San Diego State	
Baltimore Ravens	Matt Willis	WR	UCLA	
Buffalo Bills	Jon Corto	LB	Sacred Heart	
Dallas Cowboys	Jackie Battle	RB	Houston	
Dallas Cowboys	Matt Moore	QB	Oregon State	
Indianapolis Colts	Melvin Bullitt	S	Texas A&M	
Indianapolis Colts	Ed Johnson	DT	Penn State	
Jacksonville Jaguars	Brett Goode	LS	Arkansas	
Miami Dolphins	Stefan Logan	RB	South Dakota	
Miami Dolphins	Geoff Pope	CB	Howard	
Minnesota Vikings	Kyle Cook	C	Michigan State	
New Orleans Saints	Tyler Palko	QB	Pittsburgh	
New Orleans Saints	Pierre Thomas	RB	Illinois	
New York Giants	Craig Dahl	S	North Dakota State	
New York Giants	Michael Matthews	TE	Georgia Tech	
New York Jets	Mike DeVito	DE	Maine	
New York Jets	Jeremy Kapinos	P	Penn State	
New York Jets	James Ihedigbo	S	UMass	
New York Jets	Jason Trusnik	DE	Ohio Northern	
Oakland Raiders	Marquice Cole	CB	Northwestern	
Philadelphia Eagles	Akeem Jordan	LB	James Madison	
Pittsburgh Steelers	Jared Retkofsky	LS	TCU	
Pittsburgh Steelers	Gary Russell	RB	Minnesota	
Pittsburgh Steelers	Darnell Stapleton	G	Rutgers	
San Diego Chargers	Antwan Applewhite	LB	San Diego State	
San Diego Chargers	Nick Roach	LB	Northwestern	
San Diego Chargers	Jyles Tucker	LB	Wake Forest	
Seattle Seahawks	Matt Overton ^{†}	LS	Western Washington	
Tennessee Titans	Danny Ware	RB	Georgia	
Washington Redskins	Stephon Heyer	T	Maryland	

== Hall of Famers ==
- Calvin Johnson, wide receiver from Georgia Tech, taken 1st round, 2nd overall by the Detroit Lions.

Inducted: Professional Football Hall of Fame Class of 2021.

- Joe Thomas, offensive tackle from Wisconsin, taken 1st round, 3rd overall by the Cleveland Browns.

Inducted: Professional Football Hall of Fame Class of 2023.

- Darrelle Revis, cornerback from Pittsburgh, taken 1st round, 14th overall by the New York Jets.

Inducted: Professional Football Hall of Fame Class of 2023.

- Patrick Willis, linebacker from Ole Miss, taken 1st round, 11th overall by the San Francisco 49ers.

Inducted: Professional Football Hall of Fame Class of 2024.

== Trades ==
In the explanations below, (PD) indicates trades completed prior to the start of the draft (i.e. Pre-Draft), while (D) denotes trades that took place during the 2007 draft.

Round 1

Round 2

Round 3

Round 4

Round 5

Round 6

Round 7
