= 2006 Sun Belt Conference football season =

- League: NCAA Division I FBS
- Sport: football
- Duration: August 28, 2006 through January 6, 2007
- Teams: 8
- TV partner: ESPN

2007 NFL Draft
- Top draft pick: Brannon Condren
- Picked by: Indianapolis Colts, 131st overall

Regular season
- Champion: Troy
- Season MVP: Omar Haugabook

Football seasons
- ← 2005 2007 →

2006 Sun Belt Conference football standings
	Conf.			Overall
Team	W		L	W		L
Troy +	6	–	1	8	–	5
Middle Tennessee +	6	–	1	7	–	6
Arkansas State	4	–	3	6	–	6
Florida Atlantic	4	–	3	5	–	7
Louisiana–Lafayette	3	–	4	6	–	6
Louisiana–Monroe	3	–	4	4	–	8
North Texas	2	–	5	3	–	9
FIU	0	–	7	0	–	12
+ – Conference co-champions

The 2006 Sun Belt Conference football season was an NCAA football season that was played from August 28, 2008, to January 6, 2009. The Sun Belt Conference consisted of 8 football members: Arkansas State, Florida Atlantic, Florida International, Louisiana-Lafayette, Louisiana-Monroe, Middle Tennessee, North Texas, and Troy. Troy and MTSU split the Sun Belt Championship, with Troy playing in the New Orleans Bowl where they defeated Rice. Middle Tennessee would play in the Motor City Bowl where they lost to Central Michigan.

== Players of the Year ==
2006 Sun Belt Player of the Year awards

Award	Player	School
Player of the Year	Omar Haugabook	Troy
Offensive Player of the Year	Omar Haugabook	Troy
Defensive Player of the Year	Keyonvis Bouie	Florida International
Newcomer of the Year	Omar Haugabook	Troy
Freshman of the Year	Reggie Arnold	Arkansas State
Coach of the Year	Rick Stockstill	Middle Tennessee

== All-Conference Teams ==
Coaches All-Conference Selections

Position	Player	Team
First-team Offense
QB	Omar Haugabook	Troy
RB	Tyrell Fenroy	UL Lafayette
RB	Calvin Dawson	UL Monroe
WR	Johnny Quinn	North Texas
WR	Gary Banks	Troy
TE	Samuel Smith	FIU
OL	Tanner Jenkins	Arkansas State
OL	Nello Faulk	Florida Atlantic
OL	Brandon Cox	UL Lafayette
OL	Dylan Lineberry	North Texas
OL	Zach Yenser	Troy
First-team Defense
DL	Josh Pinnick	Florida Atlantic
DL	Antwan Barnes	FIU
DL	Erik Walden	Middle Tennessee
DL	Tavares Jones	Middle Tennessee
LB	Alexander Bostic III	FIU
LB	Keyonvis Bouie	FIU
LB	J. K. Sabb	Middle Tennessee
DB	Tyrell Johnson	Arkansas State
DB	Kevin Payne	UL Monroe
DB	Damon Nickson	Middle Tennessee
DB	Brannon Condren	Troy
First-team Special Teams
K	Drew Edmiston	UL Lafayette
P	Colby Smith	Middle Tennessee
RS	Damon Nickson	Middle Tennessee
All-purpose	Desmond Gee	Middle Tennessee

Position	Player	Team
Second-team Offense
QB	Clint Marks	Middle Tennessee
RB	Reggie Arnold	Arkansas State
RB	Eugene Gross	Middle Tennessee
WR	Chandler Williams	FIU
WR	LaGregory Sapp	UL Monroe
TE	Zeek Zacharie	UL Monroe
OL	Matt Mandich	Arkansas State
OL	Franklin Dunbar	Middle Tennessee
OL	Germayle Franklin	Middle Tennessee
OL	Kyle Cunningham	UL Monroe
OL	Kirbie Bodiford	Troy
Second-team Defense
DL	Jamarrow James	Arkansas State
DL	Jervonte Jackson	Florida Atlantic
DL	Jeremiah Chapman	North Texas
DL	Franklin Lloyd	Troy
LB	Koby McKinnon	Arkansas State
LB	Devrett Wade	Arkansas State
LB	Justin Rainey	Middle Tennessee
DB	Khayyam Burns	Arkansas State
DB	Taheem Acevedo	Florida Atlantic
DB	Kris Bartels	Florida Atlantic
DB	Lionell Singleton	FIU
Second-team Special Teams
K	Cole Wilson	UL Monroe
P	Truman Spencer	North Texas
RS	Leodis McKelvin	Troy
All-purpose	Michael Desormeaux	UL Lafayette
