= 2006 FIU Golden Panthers football team =

American college football season

2006 FIU Golden Panthers football
- Conference: Sun Belt Conference
- Record: 0–12 (0–7 Sun Belt)
- Head coach: Don Strock (5th season)
- Offensive coordinator: Greg Briner (5th season)
- Offensive scheme: Pro-style
- Defensive coordinator: Kevin Fouquier (1st season)
- Base defense: Multiple
- Home stadium: FIU Stadium

2006 Sun Belt Conference football standings
	Conf.			Overall
Team	W		L	W		L
Troy +	6	–	1	8	–	5
Middle Tennessee +	6	–	1	7	–	6
Arkansas State	4	–	3	6	–	6
Florida Atlantic	4	–	3	5	–	7
Louisiana–Lafayette	3	–	4	6	–	6
Louisiana–Monroe	3	–	4	4	–	8
North Texas	2	–	5	3	–	9
FIU	0	–	7	0	–	12
+ – Conference co-champions

The 2006 FIU Golden Panthers football team represented Florida International University (FIU) as a member of the Sun Belt Conference during the 2006 NCAA Division I FBS football season. Led by Don Strock in his fifth and final season as head coach, the Panthers compiled an overall record of 0–12 with a mark of 0–7 in conference play, placing last out of eight teams in the Sun Belt. The team played home game at FIU Stadium in Miami.

The season was marred by the infamous brawl against the Miami Hurricanes in the seventh week of the season, which precipitated Strock's resignation. The Golden Panthers finished the 2006 season winless in twelve games, and were outscored by opponents 313 to 115. Their average of 9.6 points scored per game was the worst in the NCAA Division I Football Bowl Subdivision (FBS) that year.

== Schedule ==
Date	Time	Opponent	Site	TV	Result	Attendance
August 31	6:00 p.m.	at Middle Tennessee	Johnny "Red" Floyd Stadium; Murfreesboro, TN	ESPN Plus	L 6–7	20,058
September 9	7:00 p.m.	at South Florida*	Raymond James Stadium; Tampa, FL	ESPN360	L 20–21	27,114
September 16	6:00 p.m.	Bowling Green*	FIU Stadium; Miami, FL		L 28–33	15,212
September 23	6:00 p.m.	at Maryland*	Byrd Stadium; College Park, MD		L 10–14	45,317
September 30	5:00 p.m.	Arkansas State	FIU Stadium; Miami, FL		L 6–31	15,174
October 7	6:00 p.m.	at North Texas	Fouts Field; Denton, TX	CSS	L 22–25 ^{7OT}	15,123
October 14	7:00 p.m.	at Miami (FL)*	Miami Orange Bowl; Miami, FL	CSS	L 0–35	51,130
October 28	2:00 p.m.	at Alabama*	Bryant–Denny Stadium; Tuscaloosa, AL	PPV	L 3–38	92,138
November 11	6:00 p.m.	Louisiana-Monroe	FIU Stadium; Miami, FL		L 0–35	15,009
November 18	5:00 p.m.	at Louisiana–Lafayette	Cajun Field; Lafayette, LA		L 7–17	15,134
November 25	7:00 p.m.	vs. Florida Atlantic	Dolphin Stadium; Miami Gardens, FL (Shula Bowl)	ESPN Plus	L 0–31	9,655
December 2		Troy	FIU Stadium; Miami, FL		L 13–26	15,023
*Non-conference game; All times are in Eastern time

== NFL draftees ==
The following FIU players were selected in the 2007 NFL draft:

Player	Round	Pick	Position	NFL Club
Antwan Barnes	4	134	Linebacker	Baltimore Ravens
Chandler Williams	7	233	Wide receiver	Minnesota Vikings
