= Brannon Condren =

American football player (born 1983)

No. 42, 28
- Position: Safety

Personal information
- Born: August 19, 1983 (age 43); Fort Walton Beach, Florida, U.S.
- Listed height: 6 ft 1 in (1.85 m)
- Listed weight: 205 lb (93 kg)

Career information
- High school: J. M. Tate (Cantonment, Florida)
- College: Troy
- NFL draft: 2007: 4th round, 131st overall pick

Career history
- Indianapolis Colts (2007); St. Louis Rams (2008); Miami Dolphins (2008); Indianapolis Colts (2008–2009)*; Cincinnati Bengals (2009)*; New York Jets (2009–2010)*
- * Offseason or practice squad member only

Awards and highlights
- First-team All-Sun Belt (2006)

Career NFL statistics
- Total tackles: 8
- Stats at Pro Football Reference

Brannon Condren (born August 19, 1983) is an American former professional football player who was a safety in the National Football League (NFL). He played college football for the Troy Trojans and was selected by the Indianapolis Colts in the fourth round of the 2007 NFL draft.

Condren was also a member of the St. Louis Rams, Miami Dolphins, Cincinnati Bengals, and New York Jets.

== Early life ==
Condren attended Tate High School in Cantonment, Florida.

== College career ==
Condren was offered a chance to walk-on at Florida State University, but chose to walk on at Troy University because he believed he would have a better opportunity.

== Professional career ==
=== Indianapolis Colts (first round) ===
Selected by the Colts in the fourth round (131st overall) of the 2007 NFL draft, Condren did not see action in the first three preseason games of the 2007 season following a groin injury. He dressed and saw action for the first time in the final preseason game against the Cincinnati Bengals. He survived final cuts and began the season on the Colts' active roster

Condren was the Colts' deactivated players list for weeks 1–4 in the 2007 season. Because of injuries in the Colts secondary, Condren was activated for the Colts' fifth regular season game against the Tampa Bay Buccaneers, playing on kick coverage/special teams.

After several weeks on the deactivated list, Condren again dressed and played in the Colts' week 8 game against the Carolina Panthers on the punt/kickoff coverage team. Week 9 again saw Brannon return to the inactive list as the Colts lost to the New England Patriots. Injuries in Week 10 allowed Condren to be activated and playing against the San Diego Chargers. Throughout the rest of the regular season, Condren was frequently on the active roster, playing mainly on special teams. As the Colts rested their number one safeties in the second part of the final regular season game, Brannon played safety for an extended period of time.

After participating with the Colts in the 2008 preseason Condren was waived by the Colts during final cuts on August 30.

=== St. Louis Rams ===
A day after being let go by the Colts, Condren was claimed off waivers by the St. Louis Rams on August 31, 2008. He was inactive for the team's first four games of the season before being waived on October 10 when the team signed practice squad wide receiver Derek Stanley to the active roster.

=== Miami Dolphins ===
Condren was signed by the Miami Dolphins on October 14, 2008, after the team released safety Tyrone Culver. In four games with the Dolphins, Condren recorded three special teams tackles. He was released on November 10 when the team re-signed safety Courtney Bryan.

=== Indianapolis Colts (second stint) ===
Condren was re-signed to the Colts' practice squad on November 14, 2008. After finishing the season on the practice squad, he was re-signed to a future contract on January 5, 2009.

He was waived on July 29, 2009.

=== Cincinnati Bengals ===
Condren was signed to the Cincinnati Bengals' practice squad on November 17, 2009. He was released on December 8.

=== New York Jets ===
Condren was signed to the practice squad of the New York Jets on December 24, 2009, after Jets practice squad safety Keith Fitzhugh was signed by the Baltimore Ravens. On June 22, 2010, Condren was cut by the team.

== Personal life ==
On June 11, 2017, Condren married Kaeleigh Bridgeman. The couple met in Pensacola, Florida. They have three children, son Champ and daughters Tate and Hunter.
