= 2006 North Texas Mean Green football team =

American college football season

2006 North Texas Mean Green football
- Conference: Sun Belt Conference
- Record: 3–9 (2–5 Sun Belt)
- Head coach: Darrell Dickey (9th season)
- Offensive coordinator: Ramon Flanigan (5th season)
- Offensive scheme: Pro spread
- Defensive coordinator: Fred Bleil (3rd season)
- Base defense: 3–4
- Home stadium: Fouts Field

2006 Sun Belt Conference football standings
	Conf.			Overall
Team	W		L	W		L
Troy +	6	–	1	8	–	5
Middle Tennessee +	6	–	1	7	–	6
Arkansas State	4	–	3	6	–	6
Florida Atlantic	4	–	3	5	–	7
Louisiana–Lafayette	3	–	4	6	–	6
Louisiana–Monroe	3	–	4	4	–	8
North Texas	2	–	5	3	–	9
FIU	0	–	7	0	–	12
+ – Conference co-champions

The 2006 North Texas Mean Green football team represented the University of North Texas as a member of the Sun Belt Conference during the 2006 NCAA Division I FBS football season. Led by Darrell Dickey in his ninth and final season as head coach, the Mean Green compiled an overall record of 3–9 with a mark 2–5 in conference play, placing seventh in the Sun Belt. The team played home games at the Fouts Field in Denton, Texas.

Dickey was fired after the season. He finished his tenure at North Texas with an overall record of 42–64.

== Schedule ==
Date	Time	Opponent	Site	TV	Result	Attendance
September 2	11:00 am	at No. 3 Texas*	Darrell K Royal–Texas Memorial Stadium; Austin, TX	FSN	L 7–56	85,123
September 9	6:00 pm	SMU*	Fouts Field; Denton, TX (Safeway Bowl)		W 24–6	25,231
September 16	6:00 pm	at Tulsa*	Skelly Stadium; Tulsa, OK		L 3–28	22,045
September 23	5:00 pm	at Akron*	Rubber Bowl; Akron, OH		L 13–33	16,011
September 30	6:00 pm	Middle Tennessee	Fouts Field; Denton, TX	ESPN Plus	L 0–35	16,986
October 7	6:00 pm	FIU^{†}	Fouts Field; Denton, TX	CSS	W 25–22 ^{7OT}	15,123
October 21	6:00 pm	at Arkansas State	Indian Stadium; Jonesboro, AR	ESPN Plus	L 10–29	19,141
October 28	2:30 pm	at Troy	Movie Gallery Stadium; Troy, AL	CSS	L 6–14	17,795
November 4	6:00 pm	Louisiana Tech*	Fouts Field; Denton, TX		L 31–34	11,103
November 11	5:00 pm	at Louisiana–Lafayette	Cajun Field; Lafayette, LA		W 16–7	13,621
November 18	6:00 pm	Florida Atlantic	Fouts Field; Denton, TX	ESPN Plus	L 16–17	9,806
November 25	6:00 pm	at Louisiana–Monroe	Malone Stadium; Monroe, LA		L 3–23	12,107
*Non-conference game; ^{†}Homecoming; Rankings from AP Poll released prior to the game; All times are in Central time

== Game summaries ==
=== Texas ===
	1	2	3	4	Total
North Texas	0	0	7	0	7
Texas	14	14	14	14	56

=== SMU ===
	1	2	3	4	Total
SMU	0	0	6	0	6
North Texas	7	0	7	10	24

=== Tulsa ===
	1	2	3	4	Total
North Texas	0	3	0	0	3
Tulsa	0	7	14	7	28

=== Akron ===
	1	2	3	4	Total
North Texas	0	7	6	0	13
Akron	20	13	0	0	33

=== Middle Tennessee ===
	1	2	3	4	Total
Middle Tennessee	14	7	7	7	35
North Texas	0	0	0	0	0

=== FIU ===
	1	2	3	4	OT	2OT	3OT	4OT	5OT	6OT	7OT	Total
FIU	0	0	13	3	0	3	0	0	3	0	0	22
North Texas	5	0	0	11	0	3	0	0	3	0	3	25

The Mean Green's contest with the FIU Golden Panthers lasted seven overtime periods before North Texas kicker Denis Hopovac made his fifth field goal of the night to bring the team ahead 25–22. Hopovac's nine field goal attempts tied an NCAA Division I Football Bowl Subdivision (FBS) single-game record. Hopovac and FIU kicker Dustin Rivest combined for eight missed field goals.

=== Arkansas State ===
	1	2	3	4	Total
North Texas	3	7	0	0	10
Arkansas State	0	10	13	6	29

=== Troy ===
	1	2	3	4	Total
North Texas	0	3	0	3	6
Troy	0	0	7	7	14

=== Louisiana Tech ===
	1	2	3	4	Total
Louisiana Tech	21	0	10	3	34
North Texas	0	24	7	0	31

=== Louisiana–Lafayette ===
	1	2	3	4	Total
North Texas	0	7	9	0	16
Louisiana–Lafayette	0	7	0	0	7

=== Florida Atlantic ===
	1	2	3	4	Total
Florida Atlantic	3	14	0	0	17
North Texas	7	3	3	3	16

=== Louisiana–Monroe ===
	1	2	3	4	Total
North Texas	0	3	0	0	3
Louisiana–Monroe	7	3	6	7	23
