= 2006 Florida Atlantic Owls football team =

American college football season

2006 Florida Atlantic Owls football
- Conference: Sun Belt Conference
- Record: 5–7 (4–3 Sun Belt)
- Head coach: Howard Schnellenberger (6th season)
- Offensive coordinator: Gary Nord (2nd season)
- Offensive scheme: Pro-style
- Defensive coordinator: Kirk Hoza (6th season)
- Base defense: 4–3
- Home stadium: Lockhart Stadium; Dolphin Stadium

2006 Sun Belt Conference football standings
	Conf.			Overall
Team	W		L	W		L
Troy +	6	–	1	8	–	5
Middle Tennessee +	6	–	1	7	–	6
Arkansas State	4	–	3	6	–	6
Florida Atlantic	4	–	3	5	–	7
Louisiana–Lafayette	3	–	4	6	–	6
Louisiana–Monroe	3	–	4	4	–	8
North Texas	2	–	5	3	–	9
FIU	0	–	7	0	–	12
+ – Conference co-champions

The 2006 Florida Atlantic Owls football team represented Florida Atlantic University (FAU) as a member of the Sun Belt Conference during the 2006 NCAA Division I FBS football season. Led by sixth-year head coach Howard Schnellenberger, the Owls compiled an overall record of 5–7 with a mark of 4–3 in conference play, tying for third place in the Sun Belt. Florida Atlantic played home games at Lockhart Stadium in Fort Lauderdale, Florida and Dolphin Stadium in Miami Gardens, Florida.

== Schedule ==
Date	Time	Opponent	Site	TV	Result	Attendance
September 2	3:30 p.m.	at No. 18 Clemson*	Memorial Stadium; Clemson, SC	ESPNU	L 6–54	78,693
September 9	7:00 p.m.	at Kansas State*	Bill Snyder Family Football Stadium; Manhattan, KS		L 0–45	43,953
September 16	7:00 p.m.	at Oklahoma State*	Boone Pickens Stadium; Stillwater, OK		L 8–48	42,970
September 23	7:00 p.m.	at South Carolina*	Williams–Brice Stadium; Columbia, SC	PPV	L 6–46	70,860
September 30	7:00 p.m.	at Louisiana–Monroe	Malone Stadium; Monroe, LA	ESPN Plus	W 21–19	14,214
October 12	7:00 p.m.	Southern Utah*	Lockhart Stadium; Fort Lauderdale, FL		W 32–7	6,431
October 18	7:30 p.m.	Louisiana–Lafayette	Lockhart Stadium; Fort Lauderdale, FL	ESPN2	L 0–6	9,827
October 28	4:00 p.m.	Arkansas State	Lockhart Stadium; Fort Lauderdale, FL		W 29–0	8,129
November 4	3:30 p.m.	at Middle Tennessee	Johnny "Red" Floyd Stadium; Murfreesboro, TN	ESPN Plus	L 14–35	18,712
November 11	4:00 p.m.	Troy	Lockhart Stadium; Fort Lauderdale, FL		L 17–24	12,340
November 18	7:00 p.m.	at North Texas	Fouts Field; Denton, TX	ESPN Plus	W 17–16	9,806
November 25	7:00 p.m.	FIU	Dolphin Stadium; Miami Gardens, FL (Shula Bowl)	ESPN Plus	W 31–0	9,655
*Non-conference game; Rankings from AP Poll released prior to the game; All times are in Eastern time
