= 2006 Louisiana–Lafayette Ragin' Cajuns football team =

American college football season

2006 Louisiana–Lafayette Ragin' Cajuns football
- Conference: Sun Belt Conference
- Record: 6–6 (3–4 Sun Belt)
- Head coach: Rickey Bustle (5th season)
- Offensive coordinator: Rob Christophel (5th season)
- Offensive scheme: Multiple
- Defensive coordinator: Brent Pry (5th season)
- Base defense: 4–3
- Home stadium: Cajun Field

2006 Sun Belt Conference football standings
	Conf.			Overall
Team	W		L	W		L
Troy +	6	–	1	8	–	5
Middle Tennessee +	6	–	1	7	–	6
Arkansas State	4	–	3	6	–	6
Florida Atlantic	4	–	3	5	–	7
Louisiana–Lafayette	3	–	4	6	–	6
Louisiana–Monroe	3	–	4	4	–	8
North Texas	2	–	5	3	–	9
FIU	0	–	7	0	–	12
+ – Conference co-champions

2006 Louisiana–Lafayette Ragin' Cajuns football team represented the University of Louisiana at Lafayette in the 2006 NCAA Division I FBS football season. The Ragin' Cajuns were led by fifth-year head coach Rickey Bustle and played their home games at Cajun Field. The Ragin' Cajuns finished the season with a record of 6–6 overall and 3–4 in Sun Belt Conference play.

== Preseason ==
=== Sun Belt Media Day ===
==== Preseason Standings ====
Sun Belt Conference Predicted Standings
Predicted finish	Team	(1st Place)
1	Louisiana-Lafayette	(3)
2	Arkansas State	(2)
3	Troy	(2)
4	North Texas	
5	Louisiana-Monroe	(1)
6	Middle Tennessee	
7	Florida Atlantic	
8	Florida International	

==== Preseason All-Conference Team ====
Offense

QB Jerry Babb
RB Tyrell Fenroy
OL Brandon Cox

Defensive

DL Tony Hills

Preseason Offensive Player of the Year

- QB Jerry Babb, Louisiana-Lafayette

== Schedule ==
Date	Time	Opponent	Site	TV	Result	Attendance	Source
September 2	7:00 pm	at No. 8 LSU*	Tiger Stadium; Baton Rouge, LA	PPV	L 3–45	92,362	
September 9	6:00 pm	at Texas A&M*	Kyle Field; College Station, TX		L 7–51	67,079	
September 23	4:00 pm	North Carolina A&T*	Cajun Field; Lafayette, LA		W 48–7	15,041	
September 30	4:00 pm	Eastern Michigan*	Cajun Field; Lafayette, LA		W 33–14	15,923	
October 7	6:00 pm	at Houston*	Robertson Stadium; Houston, TX		W 31–28	17,543	
October 18	6:30 pm	at Florida Atlantic	Lockhart Stadium; Fort Lauderdale, FL	ESPN2	W 6–0	9,827	
October 28	4:00 pm	Middle Tennessee^{†}	Cajun Field; Lafayette, LA		L 20–34	22,093	
November 4	3:00 pm	at Troy	Movie Gallery Stadium; Troy, AL		L 28–42	20,111	
November 11	4:00 pm	North Texas	Cajun Field; Lafayette, LA		L 7–16	13,621	
November 18	5:00 pm	at FIU	FIU Stadium; Miami, FL		W 17–7	15,134	
November 25	4:00 pm	Arkansas State	Cajun Field; Lafayette, LA		W 28–13	10,212	
December 2	4:00 pm	Louisiana–Monroe	Cajun Field; Lafayette, LA (Battle on the Bayou)		L 20–39	10,814	
*Non-conference game; ^{†}Homecoming; Rankings from Coaches' Poll released prior to the game; All times are in Central time

== Game summaries ==
=== @ LSU ===
Louisiana-Lafayette at LSU – Game summary

Quarter	1	2	3	4	Total
Ragin' Cajuns	0	3	0	0	3
No. 8 Tigers	14	14	7	10	45

at Tiger Stadium, Baton Rouge, LA

- Date: September 2
- Game time: 7:00 p.m. CST
- Game weather: 90 °F (32 °C); humid
- Game attendance: 92,362
- Referee: Matt Austin
- TV: CST

Game information

First quarter

- LSU - Brandon LaFell 58-yard TD pass from Jamarcus Russell, Colt David kick good, 11:29 (LSU 7-0)
- LSU - Jonathan Zenon 17-yard interception returned for TD, David kick good, 9:46 (LSU 14-0)

Second quarter

- ULL - David Akhimien 41-yard field goal, 11:21 (LSU 14-3)
- LSU - Early Doucet 17-yard TD pass from Russell, David kick good, 6:42 (LSU 21-3)
- LSU - Dwayne Bowe 29-yard TD pass from Russell, David kick good, 0:54 (LSU 28-3)

Third quarter

- LSU - Jacob Hester 3-yard TD run, David kick good, 9:28 (LSU 35-3)

Fourth quarter

- LSU - Alley Broussard 3-yard TD run, David kick good, 11:57 (LSU 42-3)
- LSU - Ryan Gaudet 33-yard field goal, 4:02 (LSU 45-3)

Top passers

- LSU - Jamarcus Russell - 13/17, 253 yards, 3 TD
- ULL - Jerry Babb - 7/17, 63 yards, 2 INT

Top rushers

- LSU - Alley Broussard - 8 carries, 46 yards, TD
- ULL - Tyrell Fenroy - 12 carries, 52 yards

Top receivers

- LSU - Dwayne Bowe - 4 receptions, 88 yards, TD
- ULL - Derrick Smith - 2 receptions, 23 yards

=== @ Texas A&M ===
Louisiana-Lafayette at Texas A&M – Game summary

Quarter	1	2	3	4	Total
Ragin' Cajuns	0	7	0	0	7
Aggies	14	17	20	0	51

at Kyle Field, College Station, TX

- Date: September 9
- Game time: 6:00 p.m. CST
- Game weather: 84 °F (29 °C); mostly cloudy
- Game attendance: 67,079
- Referee: Jon Bible

Game information

First quarter

- TAMU - Jorvorskie Lane 1-yard TD run, Stephen McGee kick good, 10:00 (TAMU 7-0)
- TAMU - Lane 2-yard TD run, McGee kick good, 4:41 (TAMU 14-0)

Second quarter

- TAMU - Chad Schroeder 15-yard TD pass rom McGee, McGee kick good, 12:40 (TAMU 21-0)
- TAMU - Lane 5-yard TD run, McGee kick good, 10:23 (TAMU 28-0)
- TAMU - McGee 35-yard field goal, 6:05 (TAMU 31-0)
- ULL - Michael Desormeaux 9-yard TD run, Drew Edmiston kick good, 1:58 (TAMU 31-7)

Third quarter

- TAMU - Lane 8-yard TD run, McGee kick good, 8:32 (TAMU 38-7)
- TAMU - Joey Thomas 56-yard TD pass from Ty Branyon, McGee kick no good, 5:38 (TAMU 44-7)
- TAMU - Branyon 12-yard TD run, McGee kick good, 0:00 (TAMU 51-7)

Top passers

- TAMU - Stephen McGee - 20/27, 200 yards, TD
- ULL - Jerry Babb - 1/8, 10 yards

Top rushers

- TAMU - Mike Goodson - 8 carries, 54 yards
- ULL - Michael Desormeaux - 10 carries, 53 yards, TD

Top receivers

- TAMU - Joey Thomas - 3 receptions, 84 yards, TD
- ULL - Erik Jones - reception, 10 yards

=== Eastern Michigan ===
Eastern Michigan at Louisiana-Lafayette – Game summary

Quarter	1	2	3	4	Total
Eagles	0	0	0	14	14
Ragin' Cajuns	14	9	7	3	33

at Cajun Field, Lafayette, LA

- Date: September 30
- Game time: 4:00 p.m. CST
- Game weather: 88 °F (31 °C); partly cloudy
- Game attendance: 15,923
- Referee: Jim Jackson

Game information

First quarter

- ULL - Jerry Babb 9-yard TD run, Drew Edmiston kick good, 7:10 (ULL 7-0)
- ULL - Jason Chery 38-yard TD pass from Babb, Edmiston kick good, 2:11 (ULL 14-0)

Second quarter

- ULL - Chery 17-yard TD pass from Babb, Edmiston kick no good, 4:54 (ULL 20-0)
- ULL - Edmiston 44-yard field goal, 0:00 (ULL 23-0)

Third quarter

- ULL - Tyrell Fenroy 3-yard TD run, Edmiston kick good, 10:33 (ULL 30-0)

Fourth quarter

- ULL - Edmiston 40-yard field goal, 12:54 (ULL 33-0)
- EMU - Andy Schmitt 3-yard TD run, Andrew Wellock kick good, 8:01 (ULL 33-7)
- EMU - Schmitt 7-yard TD run, Wellock kick good, 3:32 (ULL 33-14)

Top passers

- ULL - Jerry Babb - 17/20, 202 yards, 2 TD
- EMU - Andy Schmitt - 23/35, 171 yards

Top rushers

- ULL - Tyrell Fenroy - 15 carries, 110 yards, TD
- EMU - Andy Schmitt - 15 carries, 62 yards, 2 TD

Top receivers

- ULL - Jason Chery - 5 receptions, 93 yards, 2 TD
- EMU - Eric Deslauriers - 9 receptions, 100 yards

=== @ Houston ===
Louisiana-Lafayette at Houston – Game summary

Quarter	1	2	3	4	Total
Ragin' Cajuns	0	10	6	15	31
Cougars	14	7	7	0	28

at Robertson Stadium, Houston, TX

- Date: October 7
- Game time: 6:00 p.m. CST
- Game weather: 82 °F (28 °C); partly cloudy
- Game attendance: 17,543
- Referee: Edward Kierce

Game information

First quarter

- HOU - Jackie Battle 2-yard TD run, Ben Bell kick good, 9:12 (HOU 7-0)
- HOU - Donnie Avery 56-yard TD pass from Kevin Kolb, Bell kick good, 0:25 (HOU 14-0)

Second quarter

- HOU - Kolb 5-yard TD run, Bell kick good, 14:06 (HOU 21-0)
- ULL - Jerry Babb 14-yard TD run, Drew Edmiston kick good, 11:50 (HOU 21-7)
- ULL - Edmiston 23-yard field goal, 2:52 (HOU 21-10)

Third quarter

- ULL - Edmiston 37-yard field goal, 8:53 (HOU 21-13)
- HOU - Jeron Harvey 9-yard TD pass from Kolb, Bell kick good, 4:40 (HOU 28-13)
- ULL - Edmiston 51-yard field goal, 0:51 (HOU 28-16)

Fourth quarter

- ULL - Tyrell Fenroy 16-yard TD run, Edmiston kick good, 11:33 (HOU 28-23)
- ULL - Kevin Belton 4-yard TD pass from Babb, Babb two-point conversion pass to Derrick Smith good, 1:02 (ULL 31-28)

Top passers

- ULL - Jerry Babb - 15/29, 146 yards, TD, INT
- HOU - Kevin Kolb - 24/31, 367 yards, 2 TD

Top rushers

- ULL - Tyrell Fenroy - 24 carries, 110 yards, TD
- HOU - Jackie Battle - 7 carries, 37 yards, TD

Top receivers

- ULL - Derrick Smith - 4 receptions, 54 yards
- HOU - Jeron Harvey - 6 receptions, 118 yards, TD

=== @ Florida Atlantic ===
Louisiana-Lafayette at Florida Atlantic – Game summary

Quarter	1	2	3	4	Total
Ragin' Cajuns	0	3	3	0	6
Owls	0	0	0	0	0

at Lockhart Stadium, Fort Lauderdale, FL

- Date: October 18
- Game time: 6:30 p.m. CST
- Game weather: 85 °F (29 °C); clear and humid
- Game attendance: 9,827
- Referee: Jim Jackson
- TV: ESPN2

Game information

Second quarter

- ULL - Drew Edmiston 44-yard field goal, 11:40 (ULL 3-0)

Third quarter

- ULL - Edmiston 44-yard field goal, 11:18 (ULL 6-0

Top passers

- ULL - Jerry Babb - 11/21, 84 yards, INT
- FAU - Rusty Smith - 10/19, 88 yards, INT

Top rushers

- ULL - Tyrell Fenroy - 18 carries, 87 yards
- FAU - Charles Pierre - 12 carries, 54 yards

Top receivers

- ULL - Louis Lee - 3 receptions, 32 yards
- FAU - Jason Harmon - 3 receptions, 36 yards

=== Middle Tennessee ===
Middle Tennessee at Louisiana-Lafayette – Game summary

Quarter	1	2	3	4	Total
Blue Raiders	7	17	0	10	34
Ragin' Cajuns	7	3	3	7	20

at Cajun Field, Lafayette, LA

- Date: October 28
- Game time: 4:00 p.m. CST
- Game weather: 71 °F (22 °C); clear
- Game attendance: 21,485
- Referee: Matt Leoffler

Game information

First quarter

- ULL - Michael Adams 71-yard interception return for TD, Drew Edmiston kick good, 12:29 (ULL 7-0)
- MTSU - Desmond Gee 22-yard TD pass from Clint Marks, Colby Smith kick good, 2:37 (TIE 7-7)

Second quarter

- MTSU - Smith 31-yard field goal, 13:25 (MTSU 10-7)
- ULL - Edmiston 47-yard field goal, 9:06 (TIE 10-10)
- MTSU - Marks 1-yard TD run, Smith kick good, 5:45 (MTSU 17-10)
- MTSU - Damon Nickson 28-yard interception returned for TD, Smith kick good, 5:08 (MTSU 24-10)

Third quarter

- ULL - Edmiston 25-yard field goal, 4:50 (MTSU 24-13)

Fourth quarter

- MTSU - Smith 23-yard field goal, 9:30 (MTSU 27-13)
- MTSU - Eugene Gross 6-yard TD run, Smith kick good, 5:53 (MTSU 34-13)
- ULL - Corey Fredrick 40-yard TD pass from Jerry Babb, Edmiston kick good, 4:09 (MTSU 34-20)

Top passers

- MTSU - Clint Mark - 19/26, 244 yards, TD, INT
- ULL - Jerry Babb - 12/24, 182 yards, TD, 4 INT

Top rushers

- MTSU - Eugene Gross - 23 carries, 94 yards, TD
- ULL - Tyrell Fenroy - 16 carries, 90 yards

Top receivers

- MTSU - Taron Henry - 5 receptions, 85 yards
- ULL - Derrick Smith - 5 receptions, 70 yards

=== @ Troy ===
Louisiana-Lafayette at Troy – Game summary

Quarter	1	2	3	4	Total
Ragin' Cajuns	7	7	7	7	28
Trojans	0	21	14	7	42

at Movie Gallery Stadium, Troy, AL

- Date: November 4
- Game time: 3:00 p.m. CST
- Game weather: 60 °F (16 °C); clear
- Game attendance: 20,111
- Referee: Rick Doan
- TV: ESPN+

Game information

First quarter

- ULL - Phillip Nevels 15-yard TD pass from Jerry Babb, Drew Edmiston kick good, 6:04 (ULL 7-0)

Second quarter

- ULL - Deon Wallace 10-yard TD run, Edmiston kick good, 13:52 (ULL 14-0)
- TROY - Justin Brooks 1-yard TD run, Greg Whibbs kick good, 11:41 (ULL 14-7)
- TROY - Kenny Cattouse 7-yard TD run, Whibbs kick good, 7:31 (TIE 14-14)
- TROY - Omar Haugabook 15-yard TD run, Whibbs kick good, 4:53 (TROY 21-14)

Third quarter

- ULL - Tyrell Fenroy 41-yard TD pass from Babb, Edmiston kick good, 11:33 (TIE 21-21)
- TROY - Gary Banks 58-yard TD pass from Haugabook, Whibbs kick good, 4:38 (TROY 28-21)
- TROY - Cattouse 8-yard TD run, Whibbs kick good, 1:53 (TROY 35-21)

Fourth quarter

- ULL - Babb 13-yard TD run, Edmiston kick good, 13:55 (TROY 35-28)
- TROY - Julian Foster 15-yard TD run, Whibbs kick good, 2:11 (TROY 42-28)

Top passers

- TROY - Omar Haugabook - 12/19, 153 yards, TD, INT
- ULL - Jerry Babb - 16/29, 230 yards, 2 TD, INT

Top rushers

- TROY - Kenny Cattouse - 24 carries, 172 yards, 2 TD
- ULL - Tyrell Fenroy - 18 carries, 95 yards

Top receivers

- TROY - Gary Banks - 3 receptions, 62 yards, TD
- ULL - Derrick Smith - 4 receptions, 82 yards

=== North Texas ===
North Texas at Louisiana-Lafayette – Game summary

Quarter	1	2	3	4	Total
Mean Green	0	7	9	0	16
Ragin' Cajuns	0	7	0	0	7

at Cajun Field, Lafayette, LA

- Date: November 11
- Game time: 4:00 p.m. CST
- Game weather: 59 °F (15 °C); partly cloudy
- Game attendance: 13,621
- Referee: Ken Williamson

Game information

Second quarter

- UNT - Johnny Quinn 4-yard TD pass from Daniel Meager, Denis Hopovac kick good, 14:56 (UNT 7-0)
- ULL - Derrick Smith 2-yard TD pass from Jerry Babb, Drew Edmiston kick good, 0:00 (TIE 7-7)

Third quarter

- UNT - Casey Fitzgerald 36-yard TD pass from Matt Phillips, Hopovac kick good, 4:59 (UNT 14-7)
- UNT - Team safety, 1:27 (UNT 16-7)

Top passers

- UNT - Matt Phillips - 5/9, 91 yards, TD, INT
- ULL - Jerry Babb - 17/27, 168 yards, TD

Top rushers

- UNT - Deavin Cox - 28 carries, 98 yards
- ULL - Tyrell Fenroy - 15 carries, 60 yards

Top receivers

- UNT - Casey Fitzgerald - 2 receptions, 51 yards, TD
- ULL - Derrick Smith - 7 recpetions, 102 yards, TD

=== @ Florida International ===
Louisiana-Lafayette at Florida International – Game summary

Quarter	1	2	3	4	Total
Ragin' Cajuns	0	3	7	7	17
Golden Panthers	7	0	0	0	7

at FIU Stadium, Miami, FL

- Date: November 18
- Game time: 5:00 p.m. CST
- Game weather: 74 °F (23 °C); partly cloudy
- Game attendance: 15,134
- Referee: Matt Leoffler

Game information

First quarter

- FIU - John Ellis 1-yard TD pass from Josh Padrick, Dustin Rivest kick good, 2:49 (FIU 7-0)

Second quarter

- ULL - Drew Edmiston 47-yard field goal, 12:43 (FIU 7-3)

Third quarter

- ULL - Tyrell Fenroy 7-yard TD run, Edmiston kick good, 5:51 (ULL 10-7)

Fourth quarter

- ULL - Fenroy 2-yard TD run, Edmiston kick good, 3:30 (ULL 17-7)

Top passers

- ULL - Jerry Babb - 7/16, 76 yards, INT
- FIU - Josh Padrick - 17/31, 137 yards, TD, INT

Top rushers

- ULL - Tyrell Fenroy - 34 carries, 172 yards, 2 TD
- FIU - Julian Reams - 7 carries, 28 yards

Top receivers

- ULL - Derrick Smith - 4 receptions, 50 yards
- FIU - Chandler Williams - 7 receptions, 77 yards

=== Arkansas State ===
Arkansas State at Louisiana-Lafayette – Game summary

Quarter	1	2	3	4	Total
Indians	3	7	0	3	13
Ragin' Cajuns	0	14	0	14	28

at Cajun Field, Lafayette, LA

- Date: November 25
- Game time: 4:00 p.m. CST
- Game weather: 72 °F (22 °C); mostly cloudy
- Game attendance: 10,212
- Referee: Jim Jackson

Game information

First quarter

- ARST - Josh Arauco 38-yard field goal, 10:02 (ARST 3-0)

Second quarter

- ULL - Tyrell Fenroy 7-yard TD run, Drew Edmiston kick good, 14:16 (ULL 7-3)
- ARST - Levi Dejohnette 15-yard TD pass from Corey Leonard, Arauco kick good, 10:43 (ARST 10-7)
- ULL - Fenroy 2-yard TD run, Edmiston kick good, 4:29 (ULL 14-10)

Fourth quarter

- ARST - Arauco 36-yard field goal, 14:53 (ULL 14-13)
- ULL - Jerry Babb 32-yard TD run, Edmiston kick good, 11:31 (ULL 21-13)
- ULL - Fenroy 1-yard TD run, Edmiston kick good, 6:45 (ULL 28-13)

Top passers

- ULL - Jerry Babb - 10/18, 107 yards, INT
- ARST - Corey Leonard - 13/30, 132 yards, TD

Top rushers

- ULL - Tyrell Fenroy - 26 carries, 178 yards, 3 TD
- ARST - Reggie Arnold - 18 carries, 156 yards

Top receivers

- ULL - Derrick Smith - 3 receptions, 38 yards
- ARST - Levi Dejohnette - 3 receptions, 43 yards, TD

=== Louisiana-Monroe ===
Louisiana-Monroe at Louisiana-Lafayette – Game summary

Quarter	1	2	3	4	Total
Warhawks	13	20	6	0	39
Ragin' Cajuns	14	0	6	0	20

at Cajun Field, Lafayette, LA

- Date: December 2
- Game time: 4:00 p.m. CST
- Game weather: 54 °F (12 °C); sunny
- Game attendance: 10,814
- Referee: Rick Doan

Game information

First quarter

- ULM - Joe Merritt 24-yard TD pass from Kinsmon Lancaster, Cole Wilson kick good, 12:29 (ULM 7-0)
- ULL - Tyrell Fenroy 14-yard TD run, Drew Edmiston kick good, 8:18 (TIE 7-7)
- ULM - Calvin Dawson 36-yard TD run, Wilson kick no good, 5:44 (ULM 13-7)
- ULL - Fenroy 2-yard TD run, Edmiston kick good, 0:42 (ULL 14-13)

Second quarter

- ULM - Wilson 41-yard field goal, 13:52 (ULM 16-14)
- ULM - Dawson 18-yard TD run, Wilson kick good, 10:00 (ULM 23-14)
- ULM - LaGregory Sapp 64-yard TD pass from Lancaster, Wilson kick good, 2:04 (ULM 30-14)
- ULM - Wilson 44-yard field goal, 0:12 (ULM 33-14)

Third quarter

- ULM - Wilson 20-yard field goal, 5:27 (ULM 36-14)
- ULL - Phillip Nevels 10-yard TD pass from Jerry Babb, Babb two-point conversion pass no good, 3:15 (ULM 36-20)
- ULM - Wilson 25-yard field goal, 0:50 (ULM 39-20)

Top passers

- ULM - Kinsmon Lancaster - 11/18, 244 yards, 2 TD
- ULL - Jerry Babb - 22/42, 189 yards, TD, 3 INT

Top rushers

- ULM - Calvin Dawson - 24 carries, 129 yards, 2 TD
- ULL - Tyrell Fenroy - 27 carries, 118 yards, 2 TD

Top receivers

- ULM - LaGregory Sapp - 3 receptions, 137 yards, TD
- ULL - Derrick Smith - 8 receptions, 98 yards

== Postseason ==
=== All–Conference Team ===
First-Team Offense

OL Greg Hodges
OL Brandon Cox

First-Team Special Teams

AP Michael Desormeaux

Second-Team Offense

RB Tyrell Fenroy
OL Jesse Newman

Second-Team Defense

DE Eugene Kwarteng

Honorable Mentions

DE Anthony Hills
CB Michael Adams

=== Postseason awards ===
- Steven Jyles, ULM - Player of the Year
- Steven Jyles, ULM - Offensive Player of the Year
- Jeff Littlejohn, MTSU - Defensive Player of the Year
- Aaron Weathers, UNT - Newcomer of the Year
- Tyrell Fenroy, ULL - Freshman of the Year
- Stephen Roberts, ARST - Coach of the Year
