= 2006 New Orleans Bowl =

2006 R+L Carriers New Orleans Bowl
Rice Owls	Troy Trojans
(7–5)	(7–5)
C-USA	Sun Belt
17	41
Head coach: Todd Graham	Head coach: Larry Blakeney
	1	2	3	4	Total
Rice	7	3	0	7	17
Troy	21	7	3	10	41
- Date: December 22, 2006
- Season: 2006
- Stadium: Louisiana Superdome
- Location: New Orleans, Louisiana
- MVP: Troy QB Omar Haugabook
- Referee: Tom Tomczyk (Big East)
- Attendance: 26,423
- Payout: US$325,000 per team

United States TV coverage
- Network: ESPN2
- Announcers: Sean McDonough, Chris Spielman, Rob Stone

The 2006 R+L Carriers New Orleans Bowl featured the Troy Trojans and the Rice Owls. Rice was making its first bowl appearance since the 1961 Bluebonnet Bowl.

Troy quarterback Omar Haugabook started the scoring with a 2-yard touchdown run to give Troy an early 7–0 lead. Less than a minute later, Haugabook hooked up with Gary Banks for a 3-yard touchdown pass to give Troy a 14–0 lead. With 5:12 left in the 1st quarter, Rice got on the board with an 11-yard touchdown pass from quarterback Joel Armstrong to wide receiver Mike Falco, making the score 14–7, Troy.

With just 2 seconds left in the 1st quarter, Haugabook connected with wide receiver Mikeal Terry for a 56-yard touchdown pass, and a 21–7 lead. Clark Fangmeier connected on a 43-yard field goal to cut the lead to 21–10. Omar Haugabook later found Andrew Davis for a 7-yard touchdown pass to give Troy a 28–10 lead.

Late in the third quarter, Greg Whibbs hit a 25-yard field goal to increase the lead to 31–10. He connected on a 26-yard field goal in the fourth quarter to increase the lead to 34–10. Wide receiver Jarett Dillard caught a 1-yard touchdown pass from Joel Armstrong to bring Rice to within 34–17. With two minutes left in the game, Haugabook connected with Toris Rutledge for a 5-yard touchdown pass to close the scoring, 41–17.
