= 2006 Middle Tennessee Blue Raiders football team =

American college football season

2006 Middle Tennessee Blue Raiders football

Sun Belt co-champion

Motor City Bowl, L 14–31 vs. Central Michigan
- Conference: Sun Belt Conference
- Record: 7–6 (6–1 Sun Belt)
- Head coach: Rick Stockstill (1st season)
- Offensive coordinator: G. A. Mangus (1st season)
- Offensive scheme: Multiple
- Defensive coordinator: Manny Diaz (1st season)
- Base defense: 4–3
- Home stadium: Johnny "Red" Floyd Stadium

2006 Sun Belt Conference football standings
	Conf.			Overall
Team	W		L	W		L
Troy +	6	–	1	8	–	5
Middle Tennessee +	6	–	1	7	–	6
Arkansas State	4	–	3	6	–	6
Florida Atlantic	4	–	3	5	–	7
Louisiana–Lafayette	3	–	4	6	–	6
Louisiana–Monroe	3	–	4	4	–	8
North Texas	2	–	5	3	–	9
FIU	0	–	7	0	–	12
+ – Conference co-champions

The 2006 Middle Tennessee Blue Raiders football team represented Middle Tennessee State University as member of the Sun Belt Conference during the 2006 NCAA Division I FBS football season. Led by first-year head coach Rick Stockstill, the Blue Raiders compiled an overall record of 7–6 with a mark of 6–1 in conference play, sharing the Sun Belt title with Troy. Middle Tennessee was invited to the Motor City Bowl, the program's first bowl game at the NCAA Division I Football Bowl Subdivision (FBS) level, where they lost to Central Michigan. The team played home games at Johnny "Red" Floyd Stadium in Murfreesboro, Tennessee.

On December 12, 2005, Stockstill was hired as the new head football coach.

== Schedule ==
Date	Time	Opponent	Site	TV	Result	Attendance
August 31	6:00 p.m.	Florida International	Johnny "Red" Floyd Stadium; Murfreesboro, TN	ESPN+	W 7–6	20,058
September 9	5:00 p.m.	at Maryland*	Byrd Stadium; College Park, MD		L 10–24	47,704
September 14	6:00 p.m.	Tennessee Tech*	Johnny "Red" Floyd Stadium; Murfreesboro, TN	ESPNU	W 44–0	20,806
September 23	6:00 p.m.	at No. 17 Oklahoma*	Gaylord Family Oklahoma Memorial Stadium; Norman, OK		L 0–59	84,326
September 30	6:00 p.m.	at North Texas	Fouts Field; Denton, TX	ESPN+	W 35–0	16,986
October 6	7:00 p.m	No. 8 Louisville*	LP Field; Nashville, TN	ESPN2	L 17–44	32,797
October 21	6:00 p.m.	at Louisiana–Monroe	Malone Stadium; Monroe, LA		W 35–21	11,717
October 28	4:00 p.m.	at Louisiana–Lafayette	Cajun Field; Lafayette, LA		W 34–20	22,093
November 4	2:30 p.m.	Florida Atlantic^{†}	Johnny "Red" Floyd Stadium; Murfreesboro, TN	CSS	W 35–14	18,712
November 11	4:00 p.m.	at Arkansas State	Indian Stadium; Jonesboro, AR		W 38–10	10,176
November 18	11:30 a.m.	at South Carolina*	Williams–Brice Stadium; Columbia, SC	PPV	L 7–52	70,442
November 25	2:30 p.m.	Troy	Johnny "Red" Floyd Stadium; Murfreesboro, TN (Battle for the Palladium)	CSS	L 20–21	17,812
December 26	6:30 p.m.	vs. Central Michigan*	Ford Field; Detroit, MI (Motor City Bowl)	ESPN	L 14–31	54,113
*Non-conference game; ^{†}Homecoming; Rankings from AP Poll released prior to the game; All times are in Central time

== Starting lineup ==
=== Offense ===
Position	Number	Name	Class
QB	#17	Clint Marks	r-Sr.
TB	#20	Eugene Gross	r-Sr.
FB	#38	Hunter Birtsch	r-Jr.
TE	#80	Clinton Corder	r-Jr.
TE	#85	Stephen Chicola	Jr.
WR	#87	Bobby Williams	So.
WR	#13	Taron Henry	r-Jr.
WR	#83	Jonathan Grigsby	r-Jr.
LT	#54	Franklin Dunbar	r-So.
LG	#79	Brandon Nix	Jr.
C	#50	Paul Cantrell	r-Sr.
RG	#77	David Price	r-So.
RT	#73	Germayle Franklin	r-Sr.

=== Defense ===
Position	Number	Name	Class
LE	#13	Tavares Jones	Jr.
LT	#97	Trevor Jenkins	So.
RT	#56	Wes Hofacker	r-So.
RE	#45	Sean Mosley	r-Jr.
SLB	#39	Marcus Brandon	r-Sr.
MLB	#1	Justin Rainey	r-Sr.
WLB	#25	J.K. Sabb	Sr.
LCB	#24	Bradley Robinson	r-Jr.
RCB	#27	Regie Doucet	Sr.
FS	#5	Damon Nickson	Jr.
SS	#8	Kent Wilson	So.

=== Special teams ===
Position	Number	Name	Class
K	#46	Colby Smith	r-Sr.
KR	#22	DeMarco McNair	r-Jr.
KR	#2	Desmond Gee	Fr.
P	#46	Colby Smith	r-Sr.
PR	#24	Bradley Robinson	r-Jr.

_{* Note: r before the class year means that the player has used a redshirt year.}

== Game summaries ==
=== FIU ===
	1	2	3	4	Total
FIU	6	0	0	0	6
Middle Tennessee	0	7	0	0	7

=== Maryland ===
	1	2	3	4	Total
Middle Tennessee	3	0	7	0	10
Maryland	10	7	7	0	24

=== Tennessee Tech ===
	1	2	3	4	Total
Tennessee Tech	0	0	0	0	0
Middle Tennessee	3	0	20	21	44

=== Oklahoma ===
	1	2	3	4	Total
Middle Tennessee	0	0	0	0	0
Oklahoma	24	21	7	7	59

=== North Texas ===
	1	2	3	4	Total
Middle Tennessee	14	7	7	7	35
North Texas	0	0	0	0	0

=== Louisville ===
	1	2	3	4	Total
Louisville	10	13	7	14	44
Middle Tennessee	10	0	0	7	17

=== Louisiana–Monroe ===
	1	2	3	4	Total
Middle Tennessee					0
LA-Monroe					0

=== Louisiana–Lafayette ===
	1	2	3	4	Total
Middle Tennessee					0
LA-Lafayette					0

=== Florida Atlantic ===
	1	2	3	4	Total
FAU					0
Middle Tennessee					0

=== Arkansas State ===
	1	2	3	4	Total
Middle Tennessee					0
A-State					0

=== South Carolina ===
	1	2	3	4	Total
Middle Tennessee					0
South Carolina					0

=== Troy ===
	1	2	3	4	Total
Troy					0
Middle Tennessee					0

=== Motor City Bowl ===
	1	2	3	4	Total
Central Michigan					0
Middle Tennessee					0
