= 2006 Louisiana–Monroe Warhawks football team =

American college football season

2006 Louisiana–Monroe Warhawks football
- Conference: Sun Belt Conference
- Record: 4–8 (3–4 Sun Belt)
- Head coach: Charlie Weatherbie (4th season)
- Offensive coordinator: Bob Leahy (1st season)
- Defensive coordinator: Kim Dameron (2nd season)
- Home stadium: Malone Stadium

2006 Sun Belt Conference football standings
	Conf.			Overall
Team	W		L	W		L
Troy +	6	–	1	8	–	5
Middle Tennessee +	6	–	1	7	–	6
Arkansas State	4	–	3	6	–	6
Florida Atlantic	4	–	3	5	–	7
Louisiana–Lafayette	3	–	4	6	–	6
Louisiana–Monroe	3	–	4	4	–	8
North Texas	2	–	5	3	–	9
FIU	0	–	7	0	–	12
+ – Conference co-champions

The 2006 Louisiana–Monroe Warhawks football team represented the University of Louisiana at Monroe in the 2006 NCAA Division I FBS football season. The Warhawks offense scored 262 points while the defense allowed 267 points.

== Schedule ==
Date	Time	Opponent	Site	TV	Result	Attendance
August 31	7:00 pm	Alcorn State*	Malone Stadium; Monroe, LA		W 24–6	18,106
September 9	6:00 pm	at Kansas*	Memorial Stadium; Lawrence, KS		L 19–21	45,221
September 16	6:00 pm	at Alabama*	Bryant–Denny Stadium; Tuscaloosa, AL	PPV	L 7–41	92,138
September 30	6:00 pm	Florida Atlantic	Malone Stadium; Monroe, LA	ESPN+	L 19–21	14,214
October 7	6:00 pm	at Arkansas State	Indian Stadium; Jonesboro, AR		L 6–10	18,785
October 14	3:00 pm	at Troy	Movie Gallery Stadium; Troy, AL		L 19–24	19,415
October 21	6:00 pm	Middle Tennessee	Malone Stadium; Monroe, LA		L 21–35	11,717
October 28	6:00 pm	No. 14 Arkansas*	War Memorial Stadium; Little Rock, AR	ESPNU	L 10–44	55,420
November 11	6:00 pm	at FIU	FIU Stadium; Miami, FL		W 35–0	15,009
November 18	12:00 pm	at Kentucky*	Commonwealth Stadium; Lexington, KY		L 40–42	53,463
November 25	6:00 pm	North Texas	Malone Stadium; Monroe, LA		W 23–3	12,107
December 2	4:00 pm	at Louisiana–Lafayette	Cajun Field; Lafayette, LA (Battle on the Bayou)		W 39–20	10,814
*Non-conference game; Rankings from AP Poll released prior to the game; All times are in Central time
