= 2006 Arkansas State Indians football team =

American college football season

2006 Arkansas State Indians football
- Conference: Sun Belt Conference
- Record: 0–6, 6 wins vacated (0–3 Sun Belt, 4 wins vacated)
- Head coach: Steve Roberts (5th season)
- Offensive coordinator: Doug Ruse (5th season)
- Co-defensive coordinators: Kevin Corless (5th season); Jack Curtis (5th season)
- Home stadium: Indian Stadium

2006 Sun Belt Conference football standings
	Conf.			Overall
Team	W		L	W		L
Troy +	6	–	1	8	–	5
Middle Tennessee +	6	–	1	7	–	6
Arkansas State	4	–	3	6	–	6
Florida Atlantic	4	–	3	5	–	7
Louisiana–Lafayette	3	–	4	6	–	6
Louisiana–Monroe	3	–	4	4	–	8
North Texas	2	–	5	3	–	9
FIU	0	–	7	0	–	12
+ – Conference co-champions

The 2006 Arkansas State Indians football team represented Arkansas State University as a member of the Sun Belt Conference the 2006 NCAA Division I FBS football season. Led by fifth-year head coach Steve Roberts, the Indians finished the season with an overall record of 6–6 and a mark of 4–3 in conference play, tying for third place in the Sun Belt.

A 31-month-long investigation by the NCAA discovered that 31 ineligible athletes in various sports were fielded in several different sports programs at Arkansas State. As a result, in 2011, four of the football team's wins from the 2005 season all six victories from the 2006 season were vacated as self-imposed penalties by Arkansas State.

== Schedule ==
Date	Time	Opponent	Site	TV	Result	Attendance
September 2	6:00 p.m.	Army*	Indian Stadium; Jonesboro, AR		W 14–6 (vacated)	23,426
September 9	6:00 p.m.	vs. Oklahoma State*	War Memorial Stadium; Little Rock, AR	ESPNU	L 7–35	23,816
September 23	7:00 p.m.	at SMU*	Gerald J. Ford Stadium; University Park, TX		L 9–55	12,979
September 30	5:00 p.m.	at FIU	FIU Stadium; Miami, FL		W 31–6 (vacated)	15,174
October 7	6:00 p.m.	Louisiana–Monroe	Indian Stadium; Jonesboro, AR		W 10–6 (vacated)	18,785
October 14	6:00 p.m.	at Memphis*	Liberty Bowl Memorial Stadium; Memphis, TN (Paint Bucket Bowl)		W 26–23 (vacated)	31,758
October 21	6:00 p.m.	North Texas^{†}	Indian Stadium; Jonesboro, AR	ESPN Plus	W 29–10 (vacated)	19,141
October 28	3:00 p.m.	at Florida Atlantic	Lockhart Stadium; Fort Lauderdale, FL		L 0–29	8,129
November 4	1:30 p.m.	at No. 6 Auburn*	Jordan–Hare Stadium; Auburn, AL		L 0–27	78,493
November 11	4:00 p.m.	Middle Tennessee	Indian Stadium; Jonesboro, AR		L 10–38	10,176
November 18	6:00 p.m.	at Troy	Movie Gallery Stadium; Troy, AL	ESPN Plus	W 33–26 (vacated)	20,462
November 25	4:00 p.m.	at Louisiana–Lafayette	Cajun Field; Lafayette, LA		L 13–28	10,212
*Non-conference game; ^{†}Homecoming; Rankings from AP Poll released prior to the game; All times are in Central time
