= 2006 Troy Trojans football team =

American college football season

2006 Troy Trojans football

Sun Belt co-champion New Orleans Bowl champion

New Orleans Bowl, W 41–17 vs. Rice
- Conference: Sun Belt Conference
- Record: 8–5 (6–1 Sun Belt)
- Head coach: Larry Blakeney (16th season)
- Offensive coordinator: Tony Franklin (1st season)
- Offensive scheme: Air raid
- Defensive coordinator: Jeremy Rowell (1st season)
- Base defense: 4–2–5
- Home stadium: Movie Gallery Stadium

2006 Sun Belt Conference football standings
| | Conf. | | | Overall |
| Team | W | | L | W | | L |
|---|---|---|---|---|---|---|
| Troy + | 6 | – | 1 | 8 | – | 5 |
| Middle Tennessee + | 6 | – | 1 | 7 | – | 6 |
| Arkansas State | 4 | – | 3 | 6 | – | 6 |
| Florida Atlantic | 4 | – | 3 | 5 | – | 7 |
| Louisiana–Lafayette | 3 | – | 4 | 6 | – | 6 |
| Louisiana–Monroe | 3 | – | 4 | 4 | – | 8 |
| North Texas | 2 | – | 5 | 3 | – | 9 |
| FIU | 0 | – | 7 | 0 | – | 12 |
+ – Conference co-champions

The 2006 Troy Trojans football team represented Troy University as a member of the Sun Belt Conference during the 2006 NCAA Division I FBS football season. Led by 16th-year head coach Larry Blakeney, the Trojans compiled an overall record of 8–5 with a mark of 6–1 in conference play, sharing the Sun Belt title with Middle Tennessee. This was the program's first Sun Belt championship since joining the conference two years prior, in 2004. Troy was invited to the New Orleans Bowl, where they played Rice of Conference USA, routing the Owls by a score of 41–17. The team played home games at Movie Gallery Stadium in Troy, Alabama.

== Schedule ==
| Date | Opponent | Site | TV | Result | Attendance | Source |
|---|---|---|---|---|---|---|
| September 2 | Alabama State* | Movie Gallery Stadium; Troy, AL | | W 38–0 | 26,265 | |
| September 9 | at No. 9 Florida State* | Doak Campbell Stadium; Tallahassee, FL | Sun Sports | L 17–24 | 77,217 | |
| September 16 | at Georgia Tech* | Bobby Dodd Stadium; Atlanta, GA | | L 20–35 | 45,637 | |
| September 24 | at No. 23 Nebraska* | Memorial Stadium; Lincoln, NE | | L 0–56 | 84,799 | |
| September 30 | at UAB* | Legion Field; Birmingham, AL | | L 3–21 | 32,818 | |
| October 14 | Louisiana–Monroe | Movie Gallery Stadium; Troy, AL | | W 24–19 | 19,415 | |
| October 28 | North Texas | Movie Gallery Stadium; Troy, AL | | W 14–6 | 17,795 | |
| November 4 | Louisiana–Lafayette | Movie Gallery Stadium; Troy, AL | ESPN Plus | W 42-28 | 20,111 | |
| November 11 | Florida Atlantic | Lockhart Stadium; Fort Lauderdale, FL | | W 24–17 | 12,340 | |
| November 18 | Arkansas State | Movie Gallery Stadium; Troy, AL | | L 26–33 | 20,462 | |
| November 25 | at Middle Tennessee | Johnny "Red" Floyd Stadium; Murfreesboro, TN (Battle for the Palladium) | ESPN Plus | W 21–20 | 17,812 | |
| December 2 | at FIU | FIU Stadium; Miami, FL | | W 26–13 | 15,023 | |
| December 22 | vs. Rice | Louisiana Superdome; New Orleans, LA (New Orleans Bowl) | ESPN2 | W 41–17 | 24,791 | |
*Non-conference game; Rankings from AP Poll released prior to the game
