= Gary Banks =

American football player and coach (born 1981)

- Banks playing for the Troy Trojans

Current position
- Title: Wide receivers coach
- Team: Troy
- Conference: Sun Belt

Biographical details
- Born: November 4, 1981 (age 44); Meridian, Mississippi

Playing career
- 1997–2000: South Choctaw HS
- 2001–2002: Arizona League Cubs
- 2003: Boise Hawks
- 2004–2007: Troy
- 2008–2010: San Diego Chargers
- Positions: Right Field; Quarterback/Wide receiver

Coaching career (HC unless noted)
- 2011–2012: Spain Park HS (WR/PR/KR)
- 2013: Miles College (Asst.)
- 2014–2017: Florence HS (OC/QB)
- 2018: Foley HS (OC/WR)
- 2019–2020: Choctaw County HS
- 2021–present: Troy (WR)

Accomplishments and honors

Awards
- First-team All-Sun Belt (2006); 2× Second-team All-Sun Belt (2005, 2007)

Gary Rashad Banks (born November 4, 1981) is an American college football coach and former professional wide receiver. He is the wide receivers coach for Troy University, a position he has held since 2021. He previously played for the San Diego Chargers of the National Football League (NFL). He was signed by the Chargers as an undrafted free agent in 2008. He played college football at Troy.

== Early years ==
Banks attended Southern Choctaw High School, leading the Indians to back-to-back state titles in 1998 and 1999 while playing quarterback.

== Baseball career ==
After high school, he was selected in the fifth round of the 2000 Major League Baseball draft by the Chicago Cubs and played right field for three years as part of the Cubs' minor league system. Banks never played beyond class A, playing two years for the rookie league Arizona League Cubs and two years for the class A Boise Hawks.

== College career ==
After baseball, Banks went back to school and played college football at Troy University, switching positions from quarterback to wide receiver. While playing for the Trojans, Gary was used periodically in trick play situations and accumulated a career passing record with 8-of-9 passes completed for 110 yards and two touchdowns.

== Professional career ==
=== Pre-draft ===
Banks was not invited to the NFL Combine. However, at Troy's Pro Day, Banks recorded an official 4.51 40-yard dash and 35½ inch vertical.

=== San Diego Chargers ===
Banks went undrafted in the 2008 NFL draft, but was signed by the San Diego Chargers shortly after. After numerous injuries to the Chargers wide receiver corps, Banks was signed to the active roster on October 30, 2010. In his first NFL debut, he made his first catch for 2 yards against the Tennessee Titans. Banks was released by the Chargers on November 15, 2010.
