= 2006 Iowa Hawkeyes football team =

American college football season

2006 Iowa Hawkeyes football

Alamo Bowl, L 24–26 vs. Texas
- Conference: Big Ten Conference
- Record: 6–7 (2–6 Big Ten)
- Head coach: Kirk Ferentz (8th season)
- Offensive coordinator: Ken O'Keefe (8th season)
- Offensive scheme: Pro-style
- Defensive coordinator: Norm Parker (8th season)
- Base defense: 4–3
- MVPs: Mike Klinkenborg; Marshal Yanda
- Captains: Mike Elgin; Mike Klinkenborg; Bryan Mattison; Miguel Merrick; Marshal Yanda
- Home stadium: Kinnick Stadium

Uniform

2006 Big Ten Conference football standings
| | Conf. | | | Overall |
| Team | W | | L | W | | L |
|---|---|---|---|---|---|---|
| No. 2 Ohio State $ | 8 | – | 0 | 12 | – | 1 |
| No. 8 Michigan % | 7 | – | 1 | 11 | – | 2 |
| No. 7 Wisconsin | 7 | – | 1 | 12 | – | 1 |
| No. 24 Penn State | 5 | – | 3 | 9 | – | 4 |
| Purdue | 5 | – | 3 | 8 | – | 6 |
| Minnesota | 3 | – | 5 | 6 | – | 7 |
| Indiana | 3 | – | 5 | 5 | – | 7 |
| Northwestern | 2 | – | 6 | 4 | – | 8 |
| Iowa | 2 | – | 6 | 6 | – | 7 |
| Illinois | 1 | – | 7 | 2 | – | 10 |
| Michigan State | 1 | – | 7 | 4 | – | 8 |
$ – BCS representative as conference champion; % – BCS at-large representative; Rankings from AP Poll

The 2006 Iowa Hawkeyes football team represented the University of Iowa as a member of the Big Ten Conference during the 2006 NCAA Division I-A football season. Led by eighth-year head coach Kirk Ferentz, the Hawkeyes compiled an overall record of 6–7 with a mark of 2–6 in conference play, tying for eighth place in the Big Ten. Iowa was invited to the Alamo Bowl, where the Hawkeyes lost to Texas. The team played home games at Kinnick Stadium in Iowa City, Iowa.

== Schedule ==
| Date | Time | Opponent | Rank | Site | TV | Result | Attendance | Source |
|---|---|---|---|---|---|---|---|---|
| September 2 | 11:00 am | Montana* | No. 16 | Kinnick Stadium; Iowa City, IA | ESPNU | W 41–7 | 70,585 | |
| September 9 | 2:30 pm | at Syracuse* | No. 14 | Carrier Dome; Syracuse, NY | ABC | W 20–13 ^{2OT} | 37,199 | |
| September 16 | 11:00 am | Iowa State* | No. 16 | Kinnick Stadium; Iowa City, IA (rivalry) | ESPN | W 27–17 | 70,585 | |
| September 23 | 4:30 pm | at Illinois | No. 14 | Memorial Stadium; Champaign, IL | ESPN Plus | W 24–7 | 43,066 | |
| September 30 | 7:00 pm | No. 1 Ohio State | No. 13 | Kinnick Stadium; Iowa City, IA (College GameDay) | ABC | L 17–38 | 70,585 | |
| October 7 | 11:00 am | Purdue^{†} | No. 19 | Kinnick Stadium; Iowa City, IA | ESPNU | W 47–17 | 70,585 | |
| October 14 | 11:00 am | at Indiana | No. 15 | Memorial Stadium; Bloomington, IN | ESPN2 | L 28–31 | 31,392 | |
| October 21 | 2:30 pm | at No. 2 Michigan | | Michigan Stadium; Ann Arbor, MI | ABC | L 6–20 | 110,923 | |
| October 28 | 11:00 am | Northern Illinois* | | Kinnick Stadium; Iowa City, IA | ESPNU | W 24–14 | 70,585 | |
| November 4 | 11:00 am | Northwestern | | Kinnick Stadium; Iowa City, IA | ESPN+ | L 7–21 | 70,585 | |
| November 11 | 11:00 am | No. 16 Wisconsin | | Kinnick Stadium; Iowa City, IA (rivalry) | ESPN | L 21–24 | 70,585 | |
| November 18 | 11:00 am | at Minnesota | | Hubert H. Humphrey Metrodome; Minneapolis, MN (rivalry) | ESPN Plus | L 24–34 | 64,140 | |
| December 30 | 3:30 pm | vs. No. 18 Texas* | | Alamodome; San Antonio, TX (Alamo Bowl) | ESPN | L 24–26 | 65,875 | |
*Non-conference game; ^{†}Homecoming; Rankings from AP Poll released prior to the game; All times are in Central time

== Rankings ==
Ranking movements Legend: ██ Increase in ranking ██ Decrease in ranking — = Not ranked
| | Week | | | | | | | | | | | | | | | |
| Poll | Pre | 1 | 2 | 3 | 4 | 5 | 6 | 7 | 8 | 9 | 10 | 11 | 12 | 13 | 14 | Final |
|---|---|---|---|---|---|---|---|---|---|---|---|---|---|---|---|---|
| AP | 16 | 14 | 16 | 14 | 13 | 19 | 15 | — | — | — | — | — | — | — | — | — |
| Coaches | 17 | 15 | 16 | 14 | 13 | 19 | 13 | 23 | — | — | — | — | — | — | — | — |
| BCS | Not released | | | | | | | | 23 | — | — | — | — | — | — | — |

== Game summaries ==
=== Montana ===
Montana at Iowa

| Team | 1 | 2 | 3 | 4 | Total |
|---|---|---|---|---|---|
| Grizzlies | 0 | 0 | 7 | 0 | 7 |
| • No. 16 Hawkeyes | 7 | 10 | 7 | 17 | 41 |

- Date: September 2
- Location: Kinnick Stadium
- Game start: 11:03 a.m. CDT
- Elapsed time: 3:00
- Game attendance: 70,585
- Game weather: 74 °F (23 °C), Mostly Sunny, Wind 5–8 mph (8.0–12.9 km/h)
- Referee: Dan Capron
- TV announcers (ESPNU): Clay Matvick, Marv Cook

Iowa held FCS opponent Montana in check to get the opening-game victory.

=== At Syracuse ===
Iowa at Syracuse

| Team | 1 | 2 | 3 | 4 | OT | 2OT | Total |
|---|---|---|---|---|---|---|---|
| • No. 14 Hawkeyes | 0 | 7 | 3 | 0 | 3 | 7 | 20 |
| Orange | 7 | 0 | 0 | 3 | 3 | 0 | 13 |

- Date: September 9
- Location: Carrier Dome, Syracuse, New York
- Game start: 3:30 p.m. EST
- Game weather: Indoors (dome)
- TV announcers (ABC): Gary Thorne, Andre Ware, Todd Harris
- Source: ESPN

Scoring summary
| 1 | 6:19 | Syracuse | Taj Smith 3-yard pass from Perry Patterson (Patrick Shadle kick) | Syracuse 7-0 |
| 2 | 5:32 | Iowa | Scott Chandler 1-yard pass from Jason Manson (Kyle Schlicher kick) | Tie 7-7 |
| 3 | :22 | Iowa | Kyle Schlicher 24-yard field goal | Iowa 10-7 |
| 4 | :06 | Syracuse | Patrick Shadle 41-yard field goal | Tie 10-10 |
| OT | | Syracuse | Patrick Shadle 19-yard field goal | Syracuse 13-10 |
| OT | | Iowa | Kyle Schlicher 26-yard field goal | Tie 13-13 |
| 2OT | | Iowa | Albert Young 1-yard run (Kyle Schlicher kick) | Iowa 20-13 |

Iowa escaped with the double overtime win after a long goal line stand.

=== Iowa State ===
| | 1 | 2 | 3 | 4 | Total |
|---|---|---|---|---|---|
| Cyclones | 7 | 7 | 3 | 0 | 17 |
| Hawkeyes | 3 | 7 | 7 | 10 | 27 |

In the final in-state match-up of two former Hayden Fry assistant coaches Kirk Ferentz prevailed over Dan McCarney to bring the Cy-Hawk trophy back to Iowa City. A crucial play of the game came in the fourth quarter with Iowa State electing to go for it on fourth down, coming up inches short.

=== At Illinois ===
| | 1 | 2 | 3 | 4 | Total |
|---|---|---|---|---|---|
| Hawkeyes | 0 | 21 | 0 | 3 | 24 |
| Fighting Illini | 0 | 0 | 0 | 7 | 7 |

=== Ohio State ===
Ohio State at Iowa

| Team | 1 | 2 | 3 | 4 | Total |
|---|---|---|---|---|---|
| • No. 1 Buckeyes | 7 | 14 | 7 | 10 | 38 |
| No. 13 Hawkeyes | 3 | 7 | 0 | 7 | 17 |

- Date: September 30
- Location: Kinnick Stadium, Iowa City, Iowa
- Game start: 7:13 p.m. CST
- Elapsed time: 3:07
- Game attendance: 70,585
- Game weather: 69 °F (21 °C), Clear, Wind 6–10 mph (9.7–16.1 km/h)
- Referee: John O'Neill
- TV announcers (ABC): Brent Musburger, Kirk Herbstreit, & Lisa Salters

Scoring summary
| 1 | 11:34 | OSU | Anthony Gonzalez 12-yard pass from Troy Smith (Aaron Pettrey kick) | OSU 7–0 |
| 1 | 5:19 | IOWA | Kyle Schlicher 39-yard field goal | OSU 7–3 |
| 2 | 13:41 | OSU | Antonio Pittman 4-yard run (Pettrey kick) | OSU 14–3 |
| 2 | 11:10 | IOWA | Albert Young 15-yard run (Kyle Schlicher kick) | OSU 14–10 |
| 2 | 2:19 | OSU | Roy Hall 6-yard pass from T. Smith (Pettrey kick) | OSU 21–10 |
| 3 | 9:25 | OSU | A. Gonzalez 30-yard pass from T. Smith (Pettrey kick) | OSU 28–10 |
| 4 | 14:51 | OSU | Pettrey 36-yard field goal | OSU 31–10 |
| 4 | 13:08 | IOWA | Andy Brodell 4-yard pass from Drew Tate (Kyle Schlicher kick) | OSU 31–17 |
| 4 | 4:23 | OSU | Brian Robiskie 12-yard pass from T. Smith (Pettrey kick) | OSU 38–17 |

ESPN's College GameDay was in Iowa City for this matchup between the #1 Buckeyes (4-0) and #13 Hawkeyes (4-0). After an Albert Young touchdown early in the 2nd quarter brought the Hawkeyes to within 14-10, Ohio State pulled away for the 21-point win.

=== Purdue ===
| Team | 1 | 2 | 3 | 4 | Total |
|---|---|---|---|---|---|
| Boilermakers | 0 | 3 | 14 | 0 | 17 |
| • No. 19 Hawkeyes | 14 | 6 | 14 | 13 | 47 |

- Date: October 7
- Location: Kinnick Stadium, Iowa City, Iowa
- Game start: 11:00 a.m. CST
- TV announcers (ESPNU): Beth Mowins, Brian Kinchen

Scoring summary
| 1 | 9:53 | IOWA | Damian Sims 1-yard run (Kyle Schlicher kick) | Iowa 7–0 |
| 1 | 2:29 | IOWA | Tom Busch 2-yard pass from Drew Tate (Kyle Schlicher kick) | Iowa 14–0 |
| 2 | 10:08 | IOWA | Kyle Schlicher 39-yard field goal | Iowa 17–0 |
| 2 | :24 | IOWA | Kyle Schlicher 27-yard field goal | Iowa 20–0 |
| 2 | :00 | PUR | Chris Summers 44-yard field goal | Iowa 20–3 |
| 3 | 13:12 | IOWA | Damian Sims 8-yard run (Kyle Schlicher kick) | Iowa 27–3 |
| 3 | 10:29 | PUR | Greg Orton 18-yard pass from Curtis Painter (Chris Summers kick) | Iowa 27–10 |
| 3 | 7:20 | IOWA | Scott Chandler 4-yard pass from Drew Tate (Kyle Schlicher kick) | Iowa 34–10 |
| 3 | 4:05 | PUR | Jaycen Taylor 16-yard run (Chris Summers kick) | Iowa 34–17 |
| 4 | 11:46 | IOWA | Shonn Greene 4-yard run (kick failed) | Iowa 40–17 |
| 4 | 7:54 | IOWA | Adam Shada 98-yard interception return (Kyle Schlicher kick) | Iowa 47–17 |

The Iowa Hawkeyes welcomed Purdue to Kinnick Stadium one week after losing their much anticipated game against top-ranked Ohio State. Iowa jumped on Purdue early and often, opening up a 14-0 first quarter lead with a touchdown run by Damian Sims and a pass from quarterback Drew Tate to fullback Tom Busch. Kyle Schlicher added two field goals in the second quarter and the Hawkeyes lead 20-3 at halftime. Purdue's only first half scoring came on a 44-yard field goal by freshman Chris Summers. Sims scored again on Iowa's first possession of the second half before Greg Orton caught an 18-yard touchdown pass from Curtis Painter. Tate then hit tight end Scott Chandler for a touchdown and Purdue then responded with a Jaycen Taylor touchdown run. The Boilermakers could get no closer as they were shut out in the fourth quarter. Shonn Greene scored on a short run and Adam Shada returned an interception of a Curtis Painter pass 98 yards for a touchdown.

=== At Indiana ===
| | 1 | 2 | 3 | 4 | Total |
|---|---|---|---|---|---|
| Hawkeyes | 14 | 7 | 0 | 7 | 28 |
| Hoosiers | 7 | 10 | 7 | 7 | 31 |

=== At Michigan ===
Iowa at Michigan

| Team | 1 | 2 | 3 | 4 | Total |
|---|---|---|---|---|---|
| Hawkeyes | 0 | 0 | 6 | 0 | 6 |
| • No. 2 Wolverines | 0 | 3 | 7 | 10 | 20 |

- Date: October 21
- Location: Michigan Stadium
  Ann Arbor, MI
- Game start: 3:30 p.m. EST
- Elapsed time: 3:20
- Game attendance: 110,923
- Game weather: 55 °F (13 °C), Cloudy/Light Rain, WSW 10 mph (16 km/h)
- Referee: Dave Witvoet
- TV announcers (ABC): Brad Nessler (Play-by-play), Bob Griese, Paul Maguire (Color), & Erin Andrews (Sideline)

=== Northern Illinois ===
| | 1 | 2 | 3 | 4 | Total |
|---|---|---|---|---|---|
| Huskies | 0 | 0 | 0 | 14 | 14 |
| Hawkeyes | 7 | 10 | 0 | 7 | 24 |

=== Northwestern ===
| Team | 1 | 2 | 3 | 4 | Total |
|---|---|---|---|---|---|
| • Wildcats | 7 | 7 | 0 | 7 | 21 |
| Hawkeyes | 0 | 0 | 7 | 0 | 7 |

- Date: November 4
- Location: Kinnick Stadium, Iowa City, Iowa
- Game start: 11:10 a.m. CST
- Elapsed time: 2:43
- Game attendance: 70,585
- Game weather: 48 °F (9 °C), Overcast, Wind 5–10 mph (8.0–16.1 km/h)
- Referee: Todd Geerlings
- TV announcers (ESPN+): Wayne Larrivee, Kelly Stouffer

Scoring summary
| 1 | 10:16 | NW | Tyrell Sutton 5-yard run (Howells kick) | NW 7–0 |
| 2 | 13:48 | NW | Eric Peterman 7-yard pass from C.J. Bacher (Howells kick) | NW 14–0 |
| 3 | 3:46 | IOWA | Damian Sims 3-yard run (Kyle Schlicher kick) | NW 14–7 |
| 4 | 10:20 | NW | Terrell Jordan 34-yard run (Howells kick) | NW 21–7 |

=== Wisconsin ===
| Team | 1 | 2 | 3 | 4 | Total |
|---|---|---|---|---|---|
| • Badgers | 10 | 7 | 0 | 7 | 24 |
| Hawkeyes | 0 | 14 | 0 | 7 | 21 |

- Date: November 11
- Location: Kinnick Stadium, Iowa City, Iowa
- Game start: 11:02 a.m. EST
- Elapsed time: 3:08
- Game attendance: 70,585
- Game weather: 34 °F (1 °C), Cloudy, Wind N 7 mph (11 km/h)
- Referee: Bill LeMonnier
- TV announcers (ESPN): Sean McDonough, Chris Spielman, Rob Stone

Scoring summary
| 1 | 2:16 | WIS | Mehlhaff 31-yard field goal | Wis 7–0 |
| 1 | 0:51 | WIS | Travis Beckum 3-yard pass from Tyler Donovan (Mehlhaff kick) | Wis 10–0 |
| 2 | 8:27 | IOWA | Tony Moeaki 4-yard pass from Drew Tate (Kyle Schlicher kick) | Wis 10–7 |
| 2 | 2:16 | IOWA | Tom Busch 3-yard pass from Drew Tate (Kyle Schlicher kick) | Iowa 14–10 |
| 3 | 0:39 | WIS | Luke Swan 42-yard pass from Tyler Donovan (Mehlhaff kick) | Wis 17–14 |
| 4 | 13:49 | WIS | P.J. Hill 1-yard run (Mehlhaff kick) | Wis 24–14 |
| 4 | 10:20 | IOWA | Trey Stross 24-yard pass from Drew Tate (Kyle Schlicher kick) | Wis 24–21 |

=== At Minnesota ===
Iowa at Minnesota

| Team | 1 | 2 | 3 | 4 | Total |
|---|---|---|---|---|---|
| Hawkeyes | 7 | 10 | 0 | 7 | 24 |
| • Golden Gophers | 6 | 14 | 7 | 7 | 34 |

- Date: November 18
- Location: Hubert H. Humphrey Metrodome
- Game start: 11:10 a.m. CST
- Elapsed time: 3:05
- Game attendance: 64,140
- Game weather: Indoors
- Referee: Dan Capron
- TV announcers (ESPN+): Wayne Larrivee, Kelly Stouffer

=== Alamo Bowl ===
Texas vs. Iowa

| Team | 1 | 2 | 3 | 4 | Total |
|---|---|---|---|---|---|
| • No. 18 Longhorns | 3 | 7 | 10 | 6 | 26 |
| Hawkeyes | 14 | 0 | 7 | 3 | 24 |

- Date: December 30
- Location: Alamodome, San Antonio, Texas
- Game start: 4:30 CST
- TV announcers (ESPN): Sean McDonough, Chris Spielman, Rob Stone

== Roster ==
2006 Iowa Hawkeyes football team roster
Players
Coaches
Offense

| Pos. | # | Name | Class |
|---|---|---|---|
| OL | 58 | Rob Bruggeman | So |
| TE | 87 | Scott Chandler | Sr |
| QB | 6 | Jake Christensen | Fr |
| OL | 54 | Mike Elgin | Sr |
| RB | 23 | Shonn Greene | So |
| OL | 76 | Mike Jones | Sr |
| TE | 81 | Tony Moeaki | So |
| TE | 83 | Brandon Myers | So |
| QB | 8 | Arvell Nelson | Fr |
| OL | 71 | Seth Olsen | So |
| RB | 28 | Damian Sims | Jr |
| QB | 5 | Drew Tate | Sr |
| OL | 73 | Marshal Yanda | Sr |
| RB | 21 | Albert Young | Jr |

Defense

| Pos. | # | Name | Class |
|---|---|---|---|
| LB | 43 | Pat Angerer | Fr |
| DL | 94 | Adrian Clayborn | Fr |
| LB | 49 | A. J. Edds | Fr |
| DL | 93 | Ettore Ewen | So |
| CB | 29 | Bradley Fletcher | So |
| S | 13 | Charles Godfrey | So |
| LB | 44 | Mike Humpal | Jr |
| DL | 92 | Kenny Iwebema | Jr |
| LB | 40 | Mike Klinkenborg | Jr |
| DE | 47 | Mitch King | So |
| DT | 53 | Matt Kroul | So |
| DE | 99 | Bryan Mattison | Jr |
| LB | 27 | Edmond Miles | Sr |
| S | 25 | Marcus Paschal | Sr |

Special teams

| Pos. | # | Name | Class |
|---|---|---|---|
| P | 5 | Ryan Donahue | Fr |

Head coach

- Kirk Ferentz

Coordinators/assistant coaches

Legend

- (C) Team captain
- (S) Suspended
- (I) Ineligible
- Injured
- Redshirt

== Team players in the 2007 NFL draft ==
| Player | Position | Round | Pick | NFL club |
|---|---|---|---|---|
| Marshal Yanda | OT | 3 | 86 | Baltimore Ravens |
| Scott Chandler | TE | 4 | | San Diego Chargers |
| Mike Elgin | C | 6 | 188 | New England Patriots |
