= 2006 Big Ten Conference football season =

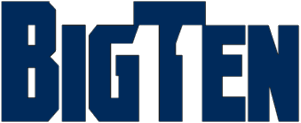
- League: NCAA Division I FBS (Football Bowl Subdivision)
- Sport: football
- Duration: August, 2006 through January, 2007
- Teams: 11
- TV partner(s): ABC, ESPN, ESPN2

2007 NFL Draft
- Top draft pick: Joe Thomas (Wisconsin)
- Picked by: Cleveland Browns, first round (3rd overall)

Regular Season
- Season Champions: Ohio State
- Season MVP: Troy Smith (Offensive) and LaMarr Woodley (Defensive)

Football seasons
- 2005 2007

2006 Big Ten Conference football standings
	Conf.			Overall
Team	W		L	W		L
No. 2 Ohio State $	8	–	0	12	–	1
No. 8 Michigan %	7	–	1	11	–	2
No. 7 Wisconsin	7	–	1	12	–	1
No. 24 Penn State	5	–	3	9	–	4
Purdue	5	–	3	8	–	6
Minnesota	3	–	5	6	–	7
Indiana	3	–	5	5	–	7
Northwestern	2	–	6	4	–	8
Iowa	2	–	6	6	–	7
Illinois	1	–	7	2	–	10
Michigan State	1	–	7	4	–	8
$ – BCS representative as conference champion; % – BCS at-large representative; Rankings from AP Poll

The 2006 Big Ten Conference football season was the 111th season for the Big Ten Conference. The season began on Thursday, August 31, 2006 when Northwestern played Miami (Ohio) and Minnesota played Kent State. The season concluded on January 8, 2007 when Big Ten champion Ohio State lost in the BCS National Championship Game to the Florida Gators.

== Preseason ==
Wisconsin athletic director Barry Alvarez was also the head coach of the team the previous season in 2005. After 15 years of coaching he decided to step down as head coach of the football team and chose Bret Bielema to succeed him.

In June 2006 Northwestern head coach Randy Walker unexpectedly died when he suffered an apparent heart attack. Northwestern alum and linebacker coach at the time Pat Fitzgerald was named his successor. The hiring made Fitzgerald the youngest Division I-A at the time of the hiring.

Following a disappointing season in which his team went 7-5 Lloyd Carr promoted defensive backs coach Ron English to defensive coordinator.

== Bowl games ==
Date	Bowl Game	Big Ten Team	Opp. Team	Score
Dec. 29, 2006	Insight Bowl	Minnesota	Texas Tech	41-44(OT)
Dec. 29, 2006	Champs Sports Bowl	Purdue	Maryland	7-24
Dec. 30, 2006	Alamo Bowl	Iowa	Texas	24-26
Jan. 1, 2007	Outback Bowl	Penn State	Tennessee	20-10
Jan. 1, 2007	Capital One Bowl	Wisconsin	Arkansas	17-14
Jan. 1, 2007	Rose Bowl	Michigan	USC	18-32
Jan. 8, 2007	BCS National Championship	Ohio State	Florida	14-41

== Awards ==
- Heisman Trophy: Troy Smith, Ohio State
- Walter Camp Award: Troy Smith, Ohio State
- Associated Press College Football Player of the Year Award: Troy Smith, Ohio State
- Bronko Nagurski Trophy: James Laurinaitis, Ohio State
- Chuck Bednarik Award: Paul Posluszny, Penn State
- Davey O'Brien Award: Troy Smith, Ohio State
- John Mackey Award: Matt Spaeth, Minnesota
- Lombardi Award: LaMarr Woodley, Michigan
- Mosi Tatupu Award: A. J. Trapasso, Ohio State
- Outland Trophy: Joe Thomas, Wisconsin
- Ted Hendricks Award: LaMarr Woodley, Michigan
