= 2006 Illinois Fighting Illini football team =

American college football season

2006 Illinois Fighting Illini football
- Conference: Big Ten Conference
- Record: 2–10 (1–7 Big Ten)
- Head coach: Ron Zook (2nd season)
- Offensive coordinator: Mike Locksley (2nd season)
- Offensive scheme: Spread option
- Defensive coordinator: Vince Okruch (1st season)
- Base defense: 4–3
- Captain: 5: Alan Ball; E.B. Halsey; J Leman; Josh Norris; Pierre Thomas
- Home stadium: Memorial Stadium

2006 Big Ten Conference football standings
	Conf.			Overall
Team	W		L	W		L
No. 2 Ohio State $	8	–	0	12	–	1
No. 8 Michigan %	7	–	1	11	–	2
No. 7 Wisconsin	7	–	1	12	–	1
No. 24 Penn State	5	–	3	9	–	4
Purdue	5	–	3	8	–	6
Minnesota	3	–	5	6	–	7
Indiana	3	–	5	5	–	7
Northwestern	2	–	6	4	–	8
Iowa	2	–	6	6	–	7
Illinois	1	–	7	2	–	10
Michigan State	1	–	7	4	–	8
$ – BCS representative as conference champion; % – BCS at-large representative; Rankings from AP Poll

The 2006 Illinois Fighting Illini football team was an American football team that represented the University of Illinois at Urbana–Champaign as a member of the Big Ten Conference during the 2006 NCAA Division I FBS football season. In their second season under head coach Ron Zook, the Illini compiled a 2–10 record (1–7 in conference games), tied for last place in the Big Ten, and were outscored by a total of 321 to 235.

The team's statistical leaders included quarterback Juice Williams (1,489 passing yards), running back Pierre Thomas (755 rushing yards), wide receiver Kyle Hudson (30 receptions, 403 receiving yards), and kicker Jason Reda (69 points scored, 24 of 24 extra points, 15 of 19 field goals).

The team played its home games at Memorial Stadium in Champaign, Illinois.

== Schedule ==
Date	Time	Opponent	Site	TV	Result	Attendance	Source
September 2	6:00 pm	Eastern Illinois*	Memorial Stadium; Champaign, Illinois	ESPN+	W 42–17	45,444	
September 9	11:00 am	at Rutgers*	Rutgers Stadium; Piscataway, New Jersey	ESPN2	L 0–33	41,036	
September 16	11:00 am	Syracuse*	Memorial Stadium; Champaign, Illinois	ESPN+	L 21–31	40,657	
September 23	11:00 am	No. 14 Iowa	Memorial Stadium; Champaign, Illinois	ESPN+	L 7–24	43,066	
September 30	11:00 am	at Michigan State	Spartan Stadium; East Lansing, Michigan	ESPN+	W 23–20	71,268	
October 7	11:00 am	Indiana^{†}	Memorial Stadium; Champaign, Illinois (rivalry)	ESPN+	L 32–34	43,006	
October 14	6:00 pm	Ohio*	Memorial Stadium; Champaign, Illinois	ESPN+	L 17–20	34,328	
October 21	6:00 pm	at Penn State	Beaver Stadium; University Park, Pennsylvania	ESPN2	L 12–26	108,112	
October 28	11:00 am	at No. 17 Wisconsin	Camp Randall Stadium; Madison, Wisconsin	ESPN2	L 24–30	81,300	
November 4	2:30 pm	No. 1 Ohio State	Memorial Stadium; Champaign, Illinois	ESPN2	L 10–17	53,351	
November 11	11:00 am	Purdue	Memorial Stadium; Champaign, Illinois	ESPN+	L 31–42	44,266	
November 18	11:00 am	at Northwestern	Ryan Field; Evanston, Illinois (Sweet Sioux Tomahawk)	ESPN+	L 16–27	22,242	
*Non-conference game; ^{†}Homecoming; Rankings from AP Poll released prior to the game; All times are in Central time

== Roster ==
2006 Illinois Fighting Illini football team roster
Players
Coaches
Offense

Pos.	#	Name	Class
TE	17	Jeff Cumberland	Fr
TE	16	Michael Hoomanawanui	Fr
WR	21	Kyle Hudson	So
OC	60	Ryan McDonald	So
RB	5	Rashard Mendenhall	So
FB	34	Walter Mendenhall	So
WR	11	Joe Morgan	Fr
RB	30	Pierre Thomas	Sr
QB	7	Juice Williams	Fr

Defense

Pos.	#	Name	Class
CB	18	Alan Ball	Sr
CB	31	Travon Bellamy	Fr
DL	59	Kam Buckner	Jr
CB	1	Vontae Davis	Fr
DE	81	Will Davis	So
CB	15	Chris Duvalt	Fr
DL	98	Xavier Fulton	Jr
LB	47	Jeremy Leman	Jr
LB	44	Brit Miller	So
S	42	Kevin Mitchell	Jr
DE	91	Derek Walker	So
LB	48	Remond Willis	So

Special teams

Pos.	#	Name	Class
K	13	Jason Reda	Jr

Head coach

- Ron Zook

Coordinators/assistant coaches

Legend

- (C) Team captain
- (S) Suspended
- (I) Ineligible
- Injured
- Redshirt

Roster
