= Damian Sims =

American gridiron football player (born 1986)

Profile
- Position: Running back

Personal information
- Born: March 26, 1986 (age 40); Boynton Beach, Florida, U.S.
- Listed height: 5 ft 9 in (1.75 m)
- Listed weight: 200 lb (91 kg)

Career information
- College: University of Iowa
- NFL draft: 2007: undrafted

Career history
- 2009: BC Lions*
- * Offseason or practice squad member only
- Stats at CFL.ca

Damian Sims (born March 26, 1986) is an American former football running back. He was signed by the BC Lions of the Canadian Football League as a street free agent in 2009. He played college football for the Iowa Hawkeyes.

His uncle is fellow BC Lion, Korey Banks.

== College career ==
As a freshman in 2004, Sims played in seven games with his debut coming against Ohio State. Against Purdue, Sims completed a pass to teammate Drew Tate in the first pass attempt of his career. Sims had one kickoff return for 37 yards in the Big Ten Championship game against Wisconsin and then a three-yard kickoff return against LSU in the Capital One Bowl. He recorded 17 rushing attempts for 45 yards and added two pass receptions for a yard in the season.

Sims saw action in 12 of Iowa's 13 games in 2005, and started off playing cornerback before switching back to running back. He played cornerback against Ball State recording three tackles, and then switched back to running back against Northern Iowa. In his return he totaled 40 yards on two rushing attempts. Against Illinois he had six rushing attempts for 81 yards. 66 of his 81 yards came on a touchdown run late in the game. He rushed for a career best 104 yards in the Minnesota game, including a 71-yard touchdown run in the second quarter. In the Outback Bowl against Florida he recorded six yards on four rushes and had 12 yards on one pass catch. Sims added 107 kickoff return yards on five attempts including a team season-high 47-yard return in the Florida game.

Sims started 2006, with seven rushes for 39 yards against Montana and then 10 rushes for 51 yards along with an 11-yard reception against Syracuse. He rushed 15 times for 55 yards against Illinois and scored his first touchdown of the season in the game. Sims' first career college start came against Purdue where he had 20 rushes for 155 yards and two touchdowns. His second start of the season came against Indiana where he ran 22 times for 94 yards and two touchdowns. In the Alamo Bowl against Texas he ran for 26 yards on 12 rushes.

Following spring practice in 2007, Sims' senior season he was listed as the second running back on the depth chart. His third career 100 rushing yards in a game came against Northern Illinois when he ran for 110 yards on 16 carries. He led the rushing attack against Syracuse with 12 rushes for 62 yards and a touchdown. In the Michigan State game, Sims ran for a season best 30-yard run and totaled 35 yards on three carries for the game.

== Professional career ==
After his career at Iowa, Sims entered the 2007 NFL draft. At the NFL Combine, Sims ran a 4.47 forty yard dash. However, he went undrafted and returned to Iowa to finish his degree and care for his daughter. In 2009, Sims' uncle BC Lions defensive back Korey Banks told Lions player personnel director Roy Shivers about his nephew and gave him a tape of Sims. Impressed, Shivers invited Sims to tryout and Sims ran a 4.4 forty yard dash, which was seven hundredths of a second faster than he ran nearly two years earlier. Sims was officially signed by the Lions in late April 2009. Sims was reportedly one of the leading contenders to replace Stefan Logan at running back with his main competition being Martell Mallett. He was released at the end of training camp on June 24, 2009.
