= 2006 Texas Longhorns football team =

American college football season

2006 Texas Longhorns football

Alamo Bowl champion

Alamo Bowl, W 26–24 vs. Iowa
- Conference: Big 12 Conference
- South

Ranking
- Coaches: No. 13
- AP: No. 13
- Record: 10–3 (6–2 Big 12)
- Head coach: Mack Brown (9th season)
- Offensive coordinator: Greg Davis (9th season)
- Offensive scheme: Spread
- Co-defensive coordinators: Gene Chizik (2nd season); Duane Akina (2nd season)
- Base defense: 4–3
- Home stadium: Darrell K Royal–Texas Memorial Stadium (Capacity: 85,123)

2006 Big 12 Conference football standings
	Conf.			Overall
Team	W		L	W		L
North Division
Nebraska x	6	–	2	9	–	5
Missouri	4	–	4	8	–	5
Kansas State	4	–	4	7	–	6
Kansas	3	–	5	6	–	6
Colorado	2	–	6	2	–	10
Iowa State	1	–	7	4	–	8
South Division
No. 11 Oklahoma x$	7	–	1	11	–	3
No. 13 Texas	6	–	2	10	–	3
Texas A&M	5	–	3	9	–	4
Texas Tech	4	–	4	8	–	5
Oklahoma State	3	–	5	7	–	6
Baylor	3	–	5	4	–	8
Championship: Oklahoma 21, Nebraska 7
$ – BCS representative as conference champion; x – Division champion/co-champions; Rankings from AP Poll

The 2006 Texas Longhorns football team represented the University of Texas at Austin in the 2006 NCAA Division I FBS football season. The team's head football coach was Mack Brown. The Longhorns (also known as Texas or UT or the Horns) played their home games in Darrell K Royal–Texas Memorial Stadium (DKR), which during 2006 was undergoing some renovations to improve older sections as well as to add extra seating capacity.

The 2006 team was the defending national champions since the previous year's team won both the Big 12 Conference championship and the National Championship. That was the program's second Big 12 Championship (27 conference championships total, including 25 in the Southwest Conference), and fourth consensus national championship in football. Their championship victory in the 2006 Rose Bowl was also the 800th win for the program and the Longhorns entered the season ranked third in the all-time list of both total wins and winning percentage (.7143).

In 2006, the Longhorn's game against Ohio State University in September was one of the most anticipated college football games of the regular season. Texas lost the game to Ohio State and completed the regular season with an overall record of 9 wins – 3 losses, and a 6–2 record in conference games. They were ranked 19th in the Bowl Championship Series (BCS) rankings, issued prior to the bowl season. The Longhorns ended their season with a victory in the 2006 Alamo Bowl against the unranked, 6–6 Iowa Hawkeyes to improve to an overall record of 10 wins – 3 losses. They were ranked 13th in the final national rankings by both the Associated Press AP Poll and the USA Today Coaches Poll As of May 1, 2007 seven players from this team had been drafted by professional football teams and two more had signed professional contracts as free agents.

== Leading into the 2006 season ==
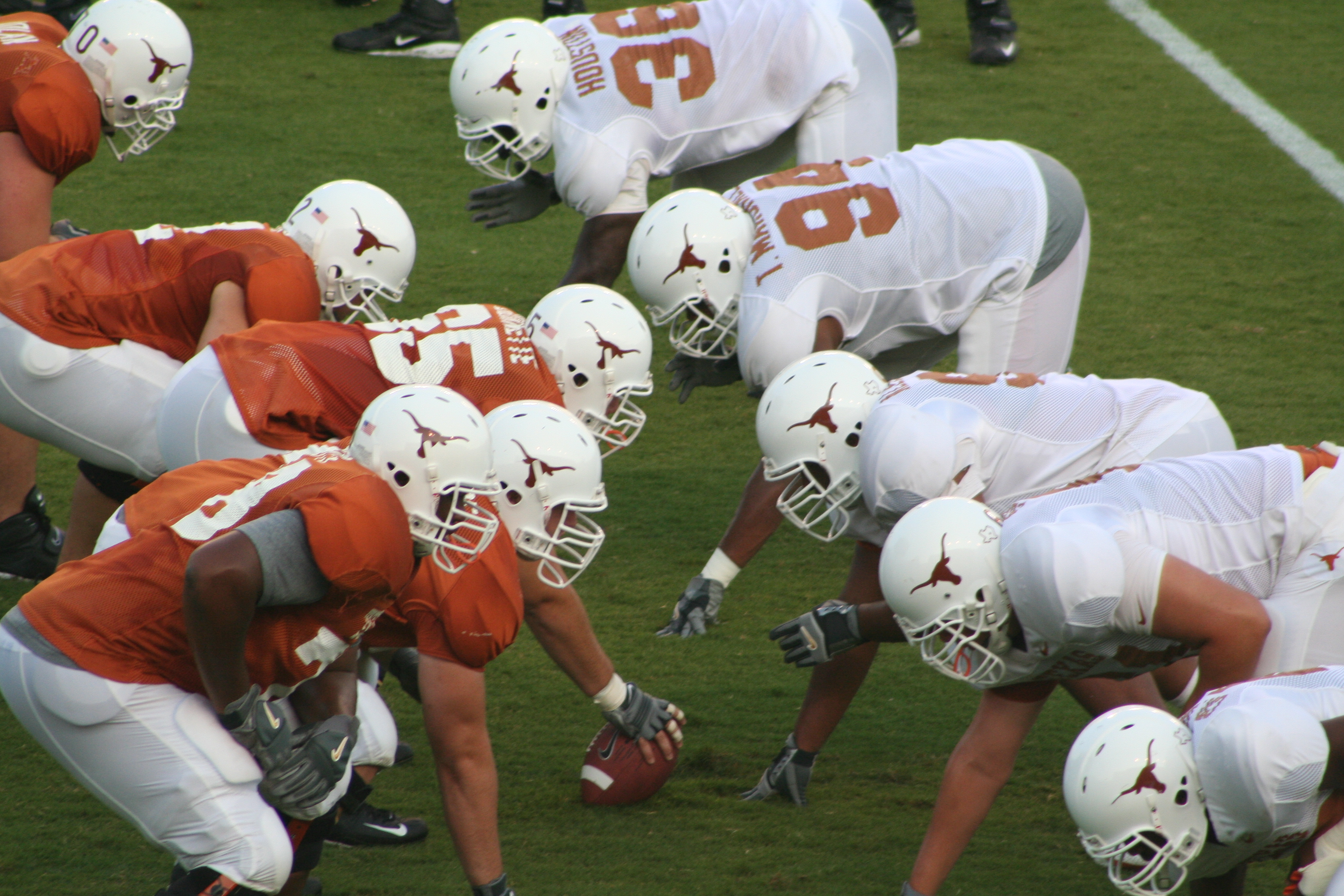
2006 Fall Orange vs. White intra-team scrimmage

In most preseason rankings, Texas was listed in the top five. In the initial USA Today Coaches' Poll, which is part of the Bowl Championship Series formula for determining which two teams play for the national championship, Texas was ranked number two. The same poll had Ohio State number 1, meaning that if both teams held their ranking until their September 9, 2006 match-up, it would be a rarely seen early-season meeting of the two most highly ranked teams in the sport. The teams did keep their respective ranking until game day and played the earliest ever meeting of the No. 1 and No. 2 ranked teams.

== Stadium renovations ==
Darrell K Royal-Texas Memorial Stadium underwent renovations just prior to the season. US$15 million were allocated by the board of regents for stadium renovations. Stage one, which began on November 14, 2005, involved updating Bellmont Hall – which sits in the west end of the stadium – to meet newer safety codes set by the Austin Fire Department. Also included were water sealing the stadium and expansion of both the Centennial Room and eighth-floor press box. $8 million was spent on audiovisual improvements, including a 7,370-square-foot (685 m^{2}) high-definition Daktronics LED scoreboard, nicknamed "Godzillatron". At the time of its creation, Godzillatron was the first high-definition video screen in college sports and the largest high-definition video screen in the world, though it was quickly surpassed by a larger screen in Tokyo. It is still the largest high-definition video screen in collegiate sports.

A new temporary bleacher seating section was added behind the south endzone bringing the stadium's stated capacity to 85,123 for the 2006 season. In mid-July 2006, The University of Texas announced that Memorial Stadium was completely sold out for the upcoming 2006 season. For the first time, tickets would not be sold on an individual game basis.

Stage 2 of the project began just after the final home game, as the north end-zone was expanded to include luxury boxes and an upper-deck. The lower deck was rebuilt in 2007, while the upper deck was ready for the 2008 season.

== Schedule ==
Date	Time	Opponent	Rank	Site	TV	Result	Attendance	Source
September 2	11:00 a.m.	North Texas*	No. 3	Darrell K Royal–Texas Memorial Stadium; Austin, TX	FSN	W 56–7	85,123	
September 9	7:00 p.m.	No. 1 Ohio State*	No. 2	Darrell K Royal–Texas Memorial Stadium; Austin, TX (College GameDay)	ABC	L 7–24	89,422	
September 16	5:00 p.m.	at Rice*	No. 8	Reliant Stadium; Houston, TX (rivalry)	ESPN2	W 52–7	40,069	
September 23	2:30 p.m.	Iowa State	No. 7	Darrell K Royal–Texas Memorial Stadium; Austin, TX	ABC	W 37–14	88,972	
September 30	6:00 p.m.	Sam Houston State*	No. 7	Darrell K Royal–Texas Memorial Stadium; Austin, TX	PPV	W 56–3	88,913	
October 7	2:30 p.m.	vs. No. 14 Oklahoma	No. 7	Cotton Bowl; Dallas, TX (Red River Rivalry)	ABC	W 28–10	76,260	
October 14	6:00 p.m.	Baylor	No. 6	Darrell K Royal–Texas Memorial Stadium; Austin, TX (rivalry)	TBS	W 63–31	88,966	
October 21	11:00 a.m.	at No. 16 Nebraska	No. 5	Memorial Stadium; Lincoln, NE	ABC	W 22–20	85,187	
October 28	6:00 p.m.	at Texas Tech	No. 5	Jones SBC Stadium; Lubbock, TX (rivalry)	TBS	W 35–31	56,158	
November 4	6:00 p.m.	Oklahoma State	No. 4	Darrell K Royal–Texas Memorial Stadium; Austin, TX	TBS	W 36–10	89,036	
November 11	7:00 p.m.	at Kansas State	No. 4	Bill Snyder Family Football Stadium; Manhattan, KS	ABC	L 42–45	47,933	
November 24	11:00 a.m.	Texas A&M	No. 11	Darrell K Royal–Texas Memorial Stadium; Austin, TX (rivalry)	ABC	L 7–12	89,102	
December 30	3:30 p.m.	vs. Iowa*	No. 18	Alamodome; San Antonio, TX (Alamo Bowl)	ESPN	W 26–24	65,875	
*Non-conference game; Rankings from AP Poll released prior to the game; All times are in Central time

== Rankings ==
Ranking movements Legend: ██ Increase in ranking ██ Decrease in ranking ( ) = First-place votes
	Week															
Poll	Pre	1	2	3	4	5	6	7	8	9	10	11	12	13	14	Final
AP	3 (8)	2 (7)	8	7	7	7	6	5	5	4	4	11	11	17	18	13
Coaches	2 (11)	2 (14)	8	8	7	7	6	5	5	4	3	11	10	17	16	13
Harris	Not released				8	8	6	5	5	4	4	12	11	17	17	Not released
BCS	Not released							9	7	7	5	13	13	19	19	Not released

== Game summaries ==
=== North Texas ===
	1	2	3	4	Total
North Texas	0	0	7	0	7
Texas	14	14	14	14	56

The win extended Texas' streak to 21 games, the longest in the NCAA at the time. The game's attendance was 85,123, a new school record and the 34th consecutive sellout.

=== Ohio State ===
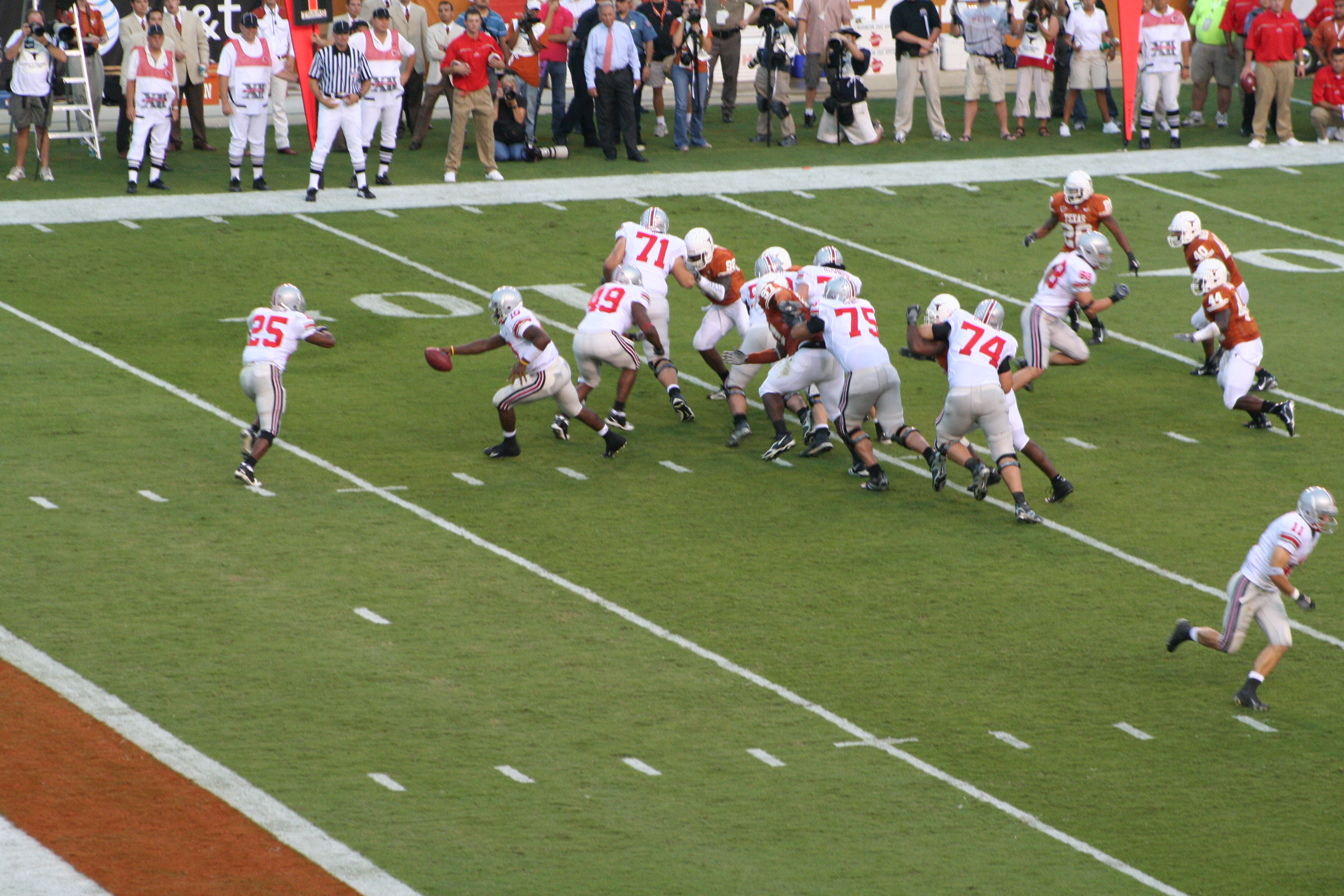
Ohio State's Troy Smith hands off to Antonio Pittman.

	1	2	3	4	Total
Ohio State	7	7	3	7	24
Texas	0	7	0	0	7

The game against Ohio State University was one of the most anticipated college football games of the regular season. The two teams had combined for 1,576 victories in 231 total years of football prior to meeting, with the Horns ranking third on the NCAA all-time victory list with 801 wins and the Buckeyes ranking sixth with 775.

Ohio State was ranked No. 1 with Texas No. 2 in both the Associated Press and the coach's polls. The September 9, 2006, game between Texas and Ohio State became a match-up of college football's No. 1 and No. 2 ranked teams for the 36th time in NCAA history.

Ohio State is only the second top-ranked team to ever play as a visiting football team in Austin, Texas. The other was SMU when then-No. 7 Texas beat the Mustangs 23–20 on November 4, 1950. Ohio State has participated in three No. 1 vs. No. 2 matchups in school history and holds a record of three wins and no losses (2–0). The most recent such win for Ohio State occurred when they beat No. 2 Michigan in their annual matchup later that same season. Texas has a 4–0 record in No. 1 vs. No. 2 matchups with all four previous victories coming en route to national championship seasons. The last time UT played in a No. 1 vs. No 2. regular season game was a win over the top-ranked Arkansas Razorbacks in one of the most famous games of the UT-ARK rivalry. The game marked the first No. 1 vs. No. 2 matchup in the regular season since 1996, when No. 2 Florida State beat No. 1 Florida 24–21. The September 9 meeting was the earliest for the No. 1 and No. 2 teams to ever face each other in any college football season.

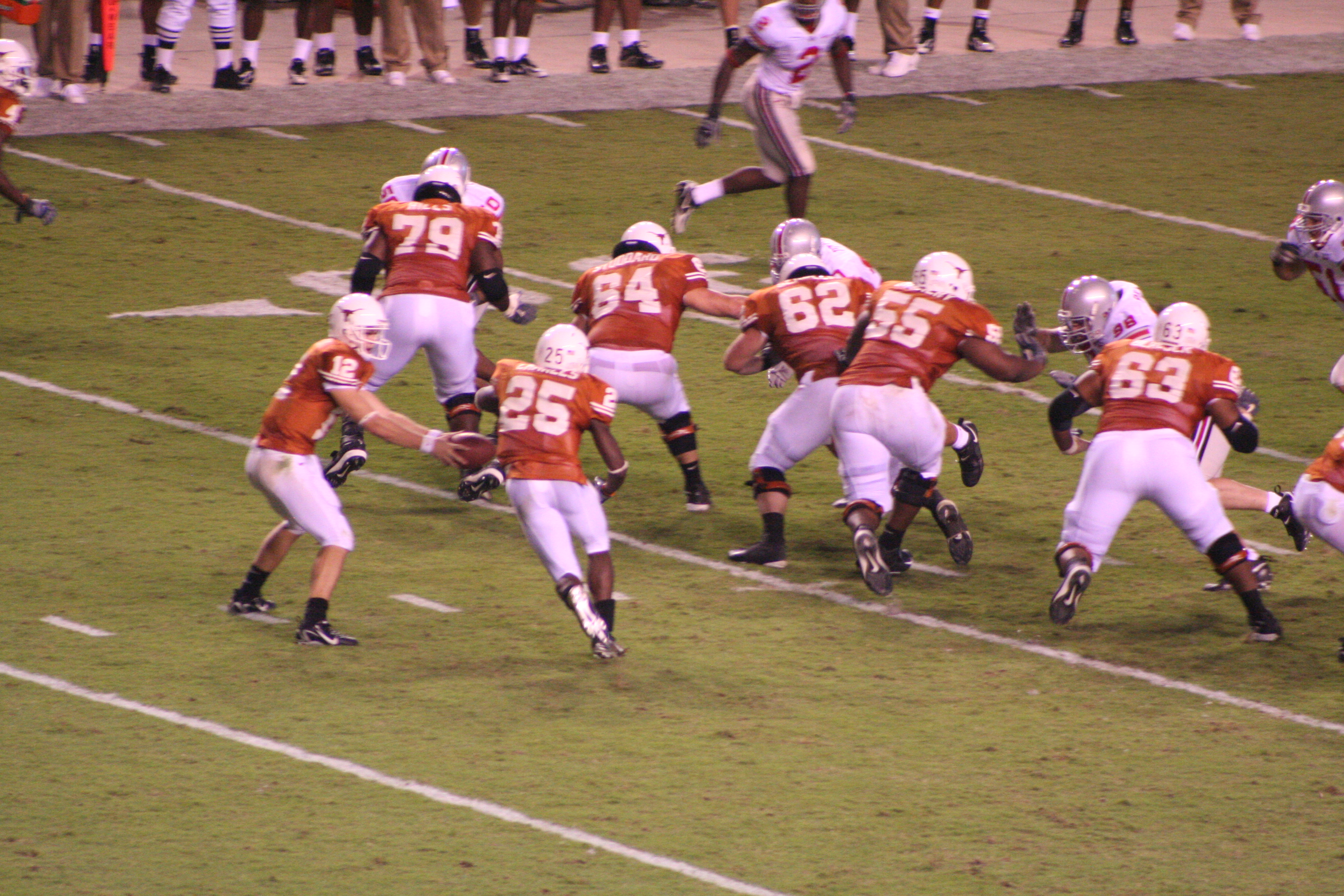
McCoy hands off to Jamaal Charles vs. Ohio State

On September 4, 2006, five days prior to the game, two UT players and one former UT player were arrested in Austin and charged for marijuana possession, a Class B misdemeanor. The two current players, Tarell Brown and Tyrell Gatewood, were suspended from the team and did not play in the September 9, 2006 game against the 2006 Ohio State Buckeyes football team. Brown was also charged with a Class A misdemeanor weapons violation for being in possession of a firearm without a permit. Tarell Brown was listed as a starting cornerback and may have covered Ohio Statewide receiver Ted Ginn Jr. in that game. Replacements included Ryan Palmer and Brandon Foster, neither of whom had started a college game. The former player, who was the owner of the handgun, is former UT linebacker Aaron Harris.

"I think it will be one of the most exciting games in the history of this school", said Texas coach Mack Brown. He said he had listed Ohio State at the top of his ballot in the coach's poll prior to the game. Ohio State coach Jim Tressel stated in a news conference that he cast his vote for Texas as the number one school coming into the game, but it was later revealed that his ballot listed Ohio State as number one.

Two United States Senators, Sen. Mike DeWine, R-Ohio and Sen. Kay Bailey Hutchison, R-Texas, placed a wager on the game. DeWine promised to deliver his wife's homemade chocolate-covered peanut butter Buckeye candies to Hutchison if Texas won, while Hutchison promised to give DeWine some Blue Bell ice cream, made in Texas, if Ohio State won. In sports book betting in Las Vegas, Nevada the day prior to the game, Texas was favored to win the game by 2 to 2 1/2 points.

Ohio State won the game 24–7. The attendance was 89,422, the most people to ever watch a football game in the state of Texas.

Texas's loss made it unlikely that Texas would repeat as National Champions. Since the Bowl Championship Series was formed in 1998, 11 of the 16 teams were unbeaten going into the game. The only time the national champion has not been unbeaten during that stretch was in 2003 when LSU and USC claimed a share of the title as each finished with one loss. Ohio State tackle Kirk Barton said "There'll probably be two undefeated teams at the end of the road and if you're not one of them you're probably not going to be playing for the championship. So you've got to treat every game like it's the Super Bowl. You only get one opportunity."

=== Rice ===
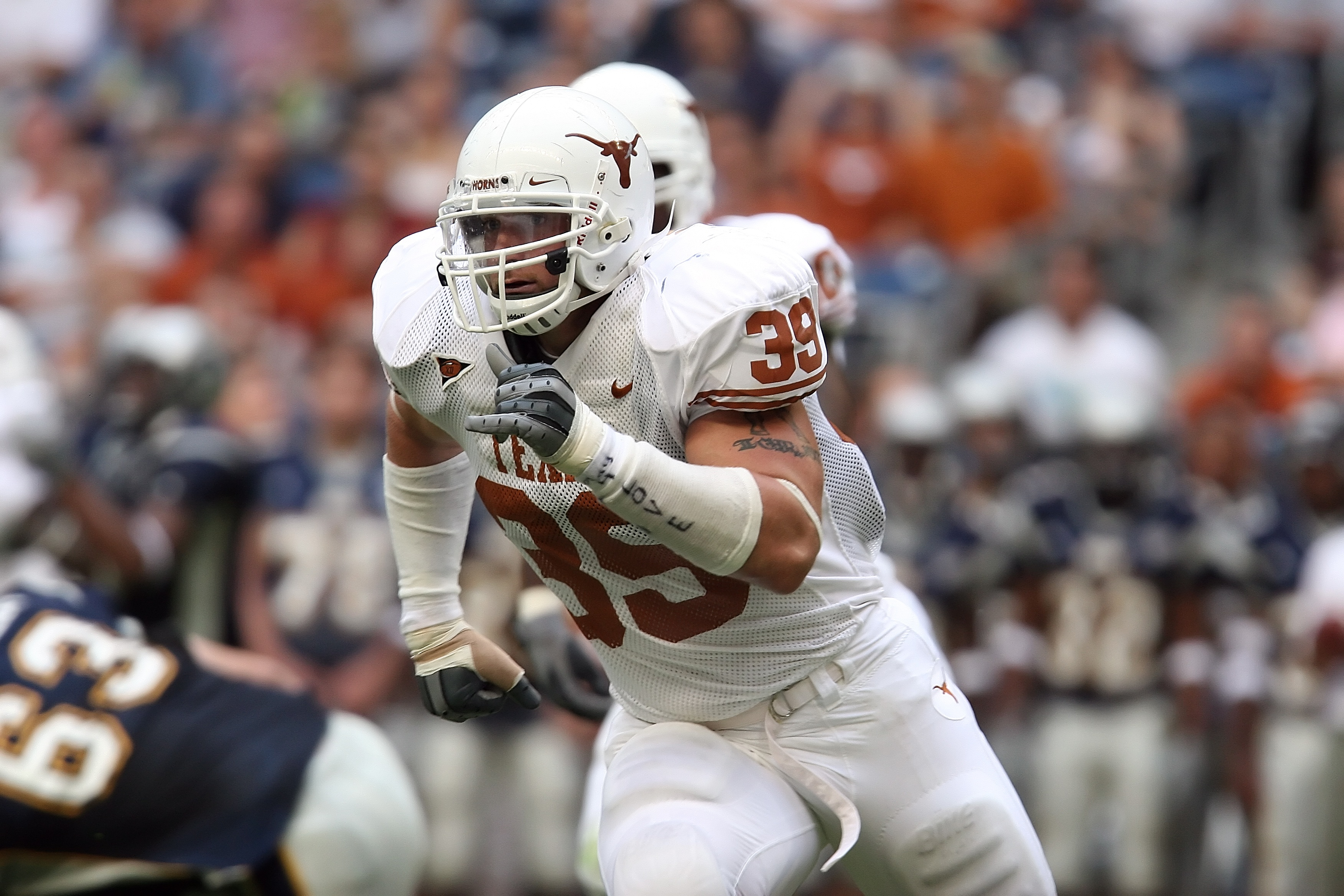
Brian Robison rushing the passer

	1	2	3	4	Total
Texas	17	21	7	7	52
Rice	0	0	0	7	7

Texas and Rice met in 2006 for the 89th time. The series, which began in 1914, is the fourth oldest (by number of games) in Texas history.

Texas and Rice were once conference foes in the Southwest Conference, despite the usual mismatch in ability on the field (66 Texas wins vs 21 wins for Rice, with one tie). President John F. Kennedy compared the challenge of going to the Moon to the challenge faced when Rice played Texas. In addition to renewing a traditional rivalry, playing Rice in a "home and away" series allows for Texas to play games in Houston, Texas, a city that is an important recruiting base for UT, along with having a significant Texas Exes alumni population.

The game was the first time Rice offensive coordinator Major Applewhite faced his former college team, where he enjoys "cult legend" status. Applewhite was a quarterback for Texas from 1998 to 2001 and set 48 school records. Many of these still stand, including the longest pass play (97 yards), most touchdown passes in a career (60), career yards (8,353), consecutive passes without an interception (156) and most yards passing in a game (473). At Rice, Applewhite has taken the team away from the "Wishbone" offense and moved them to a more modern, one-running-back formation similar to that used by Texas.

Rice won the coin toss and elected to defer to the second half, allowing Texas to start the game on offense. Texas' opening drive used 7 rushing plays (no passes) and just over 3 minutes to drive 65 yards (59 m) for a touchdown. Texas followed up by scoring a touchdown on its second possession and a field goal on its third possession to earn a 17–0 lead at the end of the first quarter. Texas won the game 52–7.

=== Iowa State ===
	1	2	3	4	Total
Iowa State	7	7	0	0	14
Texas	16	14	7	0	37

Texas began conference play on September 23, 2006, vs the Iowa State Cyclones. This was the 6th match-up between the two teams and Texas had won all five previous games.

Both teams scored in the first quarter. Iowa State opened the game on offense and failed to gain a first down, going "three and out" and punting to Texas. Texas scored a touch-down on the resulting drive. Iowa State was stopped again on its second possession. As Iowa State went to punt, the ball went out of the back of their end zone, resulting in a safety for Texas. Texas scored another touch-down on their second possession. Iowa State answered to make the score 7–16 as the first quarter ended. In the second quarter, Texas scored two touchdown and Iowa State scored one, to make the score 30–14 Texas at the half. Texas scored one more touchdown while holding Iowa State scoreless in the third quarter. At the end of the third quarter, the officials called a delay due to lightning in the area. When the game resumed, neither team scored in the fourth quarter, giving Texas a 37–14 win.

=== Sam Houston State ===
	1	2	3	4	Total
Sam Houston State	0	0	3	0	3
Texas	21	21	7	7	56

With the decision by the NCAA to allow teams to expand to a 12-game schedule, Texas added Division I-AA Sam Houston State to its schedule. The game was the first UT game since 2004 not to be televised nationally on broadcast or cable, though it was available on pay per view from DirecTV and Dish Network. This was the first-ever meeting of the Texas Longhorns and the Sam Houston State Bearkats and the first time Texas played a Division I-AA team in fourteen years.

Texas won the game 56–3.

=== Oklahoma ===
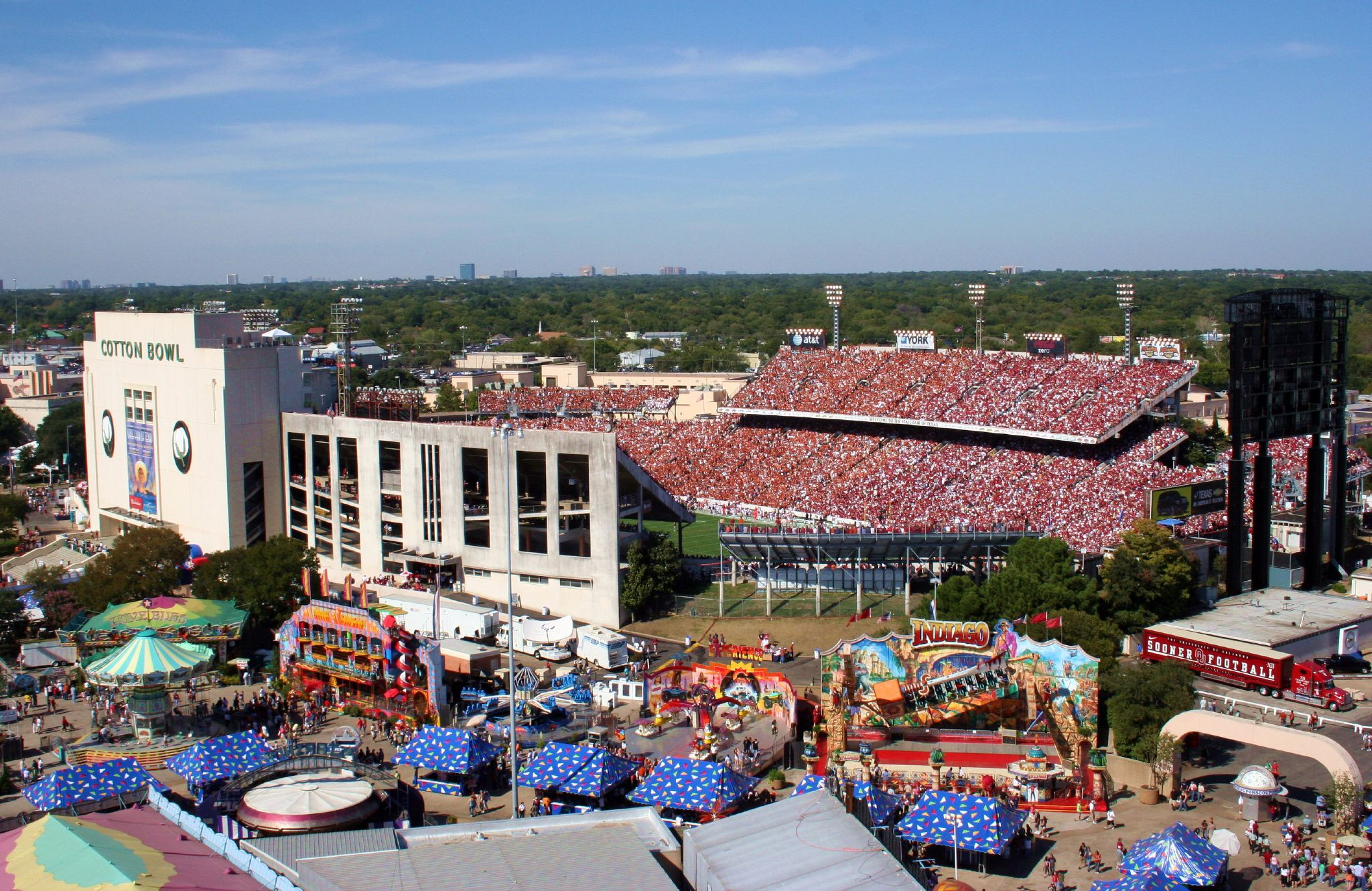
2006 Red River Shootout – Texas fans on viewer's left in Burnt Orange and White, Sooners fans on right in Crimson and Cream

#14 Oklahoma vs. #7 Texas
Red River Rivalry

Team	1	2	3	4	Total
• Texas	7	0	14	7	28
Oklahoma	0	10	0	0	10

- Date: Saturday, October 7
- Location: Cotton Bowl, Dallas
- Game start: 2:30 p.m. CST
- Game attendance: 76,260
- TV announcers (ABC): Brad Nessler (Play-by-Play), Bob Griese (Color), Paul Maguire (Color) & Bonnie Bernstein (Sideline)
- Source: ESPN

Scoring summary
1	7:47	TEX	Selvin Young 15-yard run (Greg Johnson kick)	TEX 7-0
2	7:41	OKLA	Adrian Peterson 29-yard run (Garrett Hartley kick)	Tied 7-7
2	0:04	OKLA	Garrett Hartley 25-yard field goal	OKLA 10-7
3	12:13	TEX	Limas Sweed 33-yard pass from Colt McCoy (Greg Johnson kick)	TEX 14-10
3	2:46	TEX	Jordan Shipley 7-yard pass from Colt McCoy (Greg Johnson kick)	TEX 21-10
4	10:37	TEX	Aaron Ross 3-yard fumble return (Greg Johnson kick)	TEX 28-10

The Longhorns and the 2006 Oklahoma Sooners football team met at the Cotton Bowl in Dallas for their annual rivalry game known as the Red River Shootout. This was the 101st meeting between the schools. Texas came into the game leading the series 56–39–5 overall.

Three days prior to the game, UT fans conducted the traditional Torchlight Parade and Rally, terminating on the South Mall of the UT campus. The rally first took place in 1916 prior to a game versus Texas A&M; since 1986 it has been an annual event held exclusively during the week prior to the Texas-OU game. Another annual tradition is the running of game balls by the schools' Reserve Officer Training Corps programs. Each school's ROTC program uses a relay running system to run one game ball from their respective campus to Dallas. Once there, they participate against each other in a football scrimmage, with the winner taking home a rivalry trophy and bragging rights.

The teams alternate home and away each year, and this year the Sooners played host. They occupied the bench under the press box and wore their red home jerseys while Texas will wore their all-white road uniforms. The stadium, as usual, was split down the 50-yard (46 m) line with Sooner fans sitting on the south side of mid-field. The division is visually striking with a difference in crowd noise levels from one end of the stadium to the other. Beginning in 2007, the teams will alternate North and South ends of the field, giving the home team fans the seats adjacent to the tunnel leading to both teams' locker rooms. The game is worth an estimated US$21 million in direct spending to the Dallas economy. The UT ticket office controls 37,000 tickets for the game, 7,000 of which were assigned to student season ticket holders plus another 2,000 assigned to students through a lottery. On eBay, tickets were selling for over US$500 (equivalent to $779.88 in 2024).

As intense as the rivalry between the schools is, there were many factors tying the programs together in 2006. Texas head coach Mack Brown was the offensive coordinator for the Sooners in 1984 (the Red River Shootout ended in a 15–15 tie that year). He is also the brother of UAB head coach Watson Brown, who lost to OU at the beginning of the 2006 season. Oklahoma Co-defensive Coordinator and defensive backs coach Bobby Jack Wright was an assistant coach at Texas from 1986 to '97. OU also had two Austin natives on their roster this season, QB Hays McEachern and WR Fred Strong. McEachern's father was the Texas quarterback in 1977 and 1978 and his mother was a Longhorn cheerleader.

With the two teams in the south division of the same conference, it is difficult for either team to win their half of the conference without winning this game although this did occur in the 2006 season. The winner of the game has a much greater chance to be the Big 12 South division champion and play in the Big 12 Championship Game at Arrowhead Stadium in Kansas City. The game often has national title implications as well. Since 1999, the winner in of this rivalry game has gone on to the BCS National Championship on 3 occasions, the Sooners in 2000 and 2004, and the Longhorns in 2005. Prior to the game, the sports line in Vegas casinos was 4 to 41/2 points with Texas the favorite.

McCoy got his first win over a ranked team as well as his first come-from-behind victory when he threw 2 touchdown passes and led the Longhorns to a 28–10 win. He threw 11 completed passes in 18 attempts for a total of 108 passing, with no interceptions.

The 2 touchdowns by McCoy gave him 12 touchdown passes for the season, tied for third with Longhorn passer James Brown in the list of most touchdowns by a freshman. Despite a prediction by the UT student newspaper, The win gave Texas its second win in a row vs Oklahoma and 17th straight conference win.

Oklahoma outgained Texas 333 to 232 in total yards, but the Sooners turned the ball over five times to none by Texas. Four of Oklahoma's turnover occurred in the second half. Texas' Aaron Ross was credited with three of those turnovers, as he intercepted two passes and recovered a fumble for a touchdown. It was the first time since 1967 that Texas avoided making a turnover in the Red River Shootout. Oklahoma also suffered from penalties, committing 11 to the Longhorns' 3. Oklahoma coach Bob Stoops said after the game, "They made the plays and the turnovers, and we did not. Congratulations to them."

The attendance for the game, 76,260, was second highest for a Texas-OU game behind the 79,587 who saw the 2004 game. Fans in the Oklahoma end of the stadium were filing out to the State Fair of Texas with more than seven minutes left and they were practically all gone with one minute remaining as the Longhorn fans chanted "Poor Sooners" and soon after, sang "The Eyes of Texas". After the win, defensive end Brian Robison donned the Golden Hat from the Red River Shootout winner's trophy. He also planted a Longhorn flag in the turf of the Cotton Bowl. When combined with the 2005 score, the Longhorns have outscored the Sooners 75–22 for the Longhorns' largest winning margin across a two-game stretch in the 101-game history of the rivalry.

=== Baylor ===
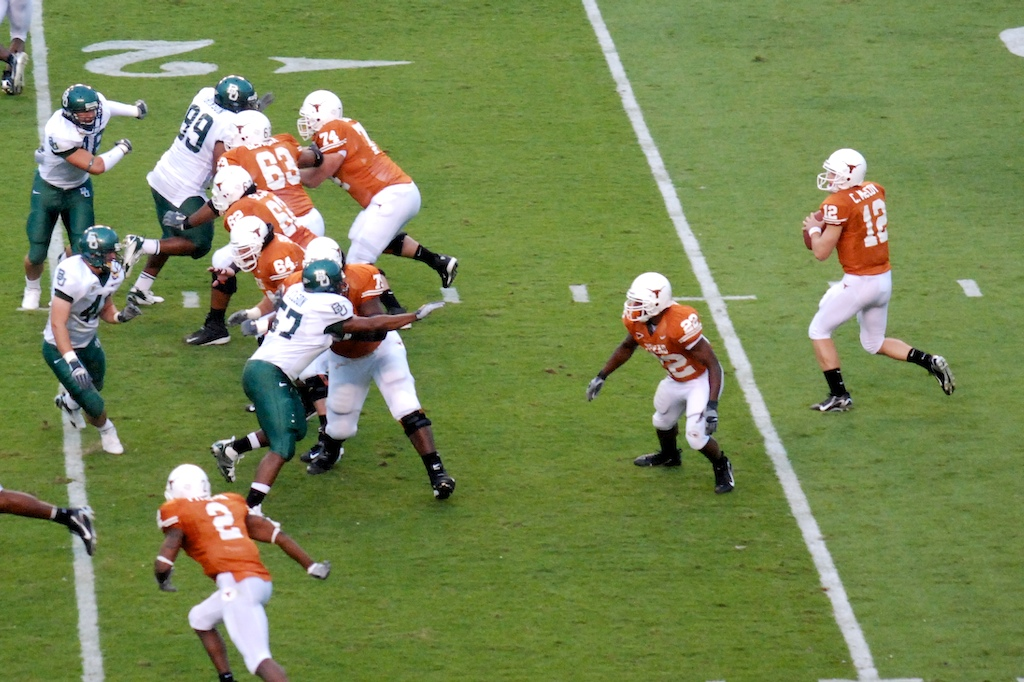
Colt McCoy drops back for a pass against Baylor

	1	2	3	4	Total
Baylor	10	0	14	7	31
Texas	0	28	14	21	63

The Longhorns first played Baylor in 1901 and faced them annually during the days of the Southwest Conference. In the 96 meetings through 2006, Texas' record was 70 wins, 22 losses, and 4 ties. This is Texas' third-longest rivalry by number of games: only Oklahoma and Texas A&M have faced Texas more often on the football field. The morning of the game, the betting line in Las Vegas was Texas by 27 1/2–28 points.

Baylor quarterback Shawn Bell used play action and passed for a 67-yard (61 m) touchdown on the first play. Bell then ran down the field flashing the upside-down Hook 'em Horns sign. Baylor added a field goal to outscore Texas 10 – 0 in the first quarter. Texas forced 3 turnovers in the second quarter, scoring touchdowns off each of them. Texas scored a fourth touchdown to take a 28 – 10 lead into half time. The two teams each scored 14 points in the third quarter while in the final quarter Texas scored 21 to 7 points by Baylor. The final score was Texas 63, Baylor 31.

Texas quarterback Colt McCoy threw six touchdown passes in the game, the most ever by a Texas quarterback. The previous record of 5 touchdown passes had been held by James Brown (set vs Baylor in 1994) and Chris Simms (vs Oklahoma State in 2001). McCoy completed 21-of-32 attempted passes for a total of 275 yards (251 m), with one interception. The game moved McCoy from eighth to fifth in the list of quarterbacks by passing efficiency, and the 18 touchdown passes were the third most in the nation. Following the game, McCoy was selected as the Cingular All-America Player of the Week.

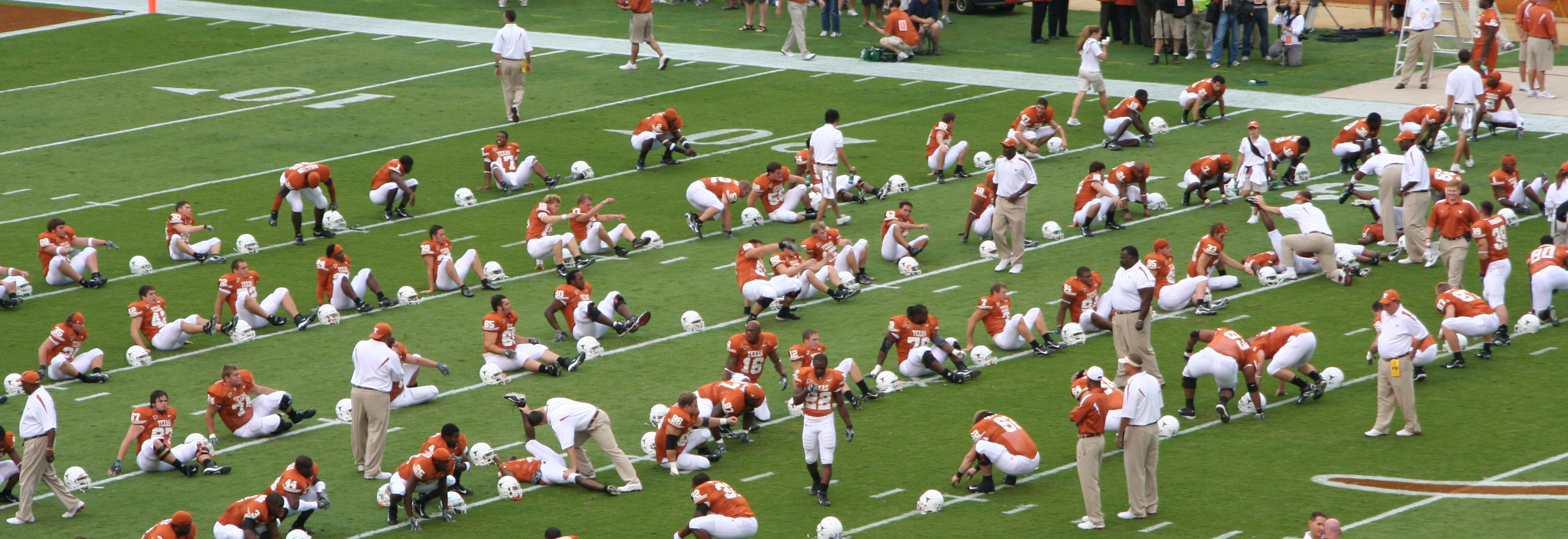
UT players stretching before game time

=== Nebraska ===
	1	2	3	4	Total
Texas	3	13	0	6	22
Nebraska	7	0	0	13	20

Aided by an Auburn victory against Florida, Texas moved up one spot to No. 5 in the AP poll following the win against Baylor. The first Bowl Championship Series rankings of the year were issued on October 15, 2006. Along with the AP poll, the BCS rankings use the Harris Interactive Poll and a series of computer scores to rank teams. Texas had a number 5 ranking in both human polls, but a combined computer ranking of 15th meant that the Longhorns entered the BCS poll ranked ninth.

The 2006 Nebraska Cornhuskers entered the game against Texas ranked 16th in both human polls and 19th in the computer rankings, for a total BCS ranking of 17th. Coming into the game, Texas was the third-winningest program in college football, with 806 wins. Nebraska was fourth, having won their 800th game the previous weekend vs Kansas State. Only four teams have won 800 or more games: Michigan, Notre Dame, Texas, and now Nebraska.

In terms of winning percentage, Texas ranked third at 71.52% while Nebraska ranked seventh at 70.57%.

Austin American-Statesman columnist Kirk Bohls predicted that Nebraska might pull off an upset against the Longhorns. He said that "Texas isn't a great running team (only a good one).." that "Texas' pass defense is very suspect..." and that Longhorn kicker Greg Johnson had only kicked one field goal all year. Bohls also speculated that Nebraska might have more motivation because "Texas has had Nebraska's number for a while,... [Texas] knocked off the Huskers in the inaugural Big 12 football championship game at St. Louis to deprive Nebraska of a shot at another national title in 1996." In 1998, freshman quarterback Major Applewhite led the Longhorns to a victory over the seventh-ranked Cornhuskers, snapping their 47-home game winning streak. they also ended the Cornhuskers new, national-best, winning streak at 26 in 2002. Entering the 2006 game, Texas was the only team in the Big Twelve Conference with a winning record (6–4) vs. Nebraska. Texas led the series 5–1 since the formation of the Big Twelve, and they were 4–1 against Nebraska since Mack Brown came to Texas.

Prior to the game, the Las Vegas betting line was Texas by 5 1/2 points. The game set a new stadium attendance record crowd of 85,187, the 280th consecutive sell-out at Nebraska. Before the game, Nebraska honored Mike Rozier for his induction into the College Football Hall of Fame. The Nebraska players all touched a horseshoe as the entered Memorial Stadium, which was referred to by a writer from The Daily Texan as "perhaps the most polished in the Big 12." The game featured 36-degree temperatures, winds out of the north at 20 miles per hour (32 km/h), rain, and snow flurries

In the fourth quarter with Nebraska trailing by 6, Coach Callahan called what seemed to be a sweep play similar to ones they had used earlier in the game. However, when running back Marlon Lucky got the pitch, he threw a 25-yard (23 m) touchdown pass to Nate Swift. The extra point gave Nebraska a one-point lead with 4:54 left in the game. Texas safety Aaron Ross took responsibility for over-pursuing on the run; "It was my fault. The receiver did a great job pretending like he was blocking, I came down to force on the run, and they beat us deep."

After Texas was forced to punt, Nebraska had to run out the clock to ensure victory. On first and second down, Brandon Jackson rushed twice for seven yards (6.4 m), bringing up a third down with three yards (2.7 m) to go on its own 36-yard (33 m) line and 2:23 remaining on the clock. Texas' defense had limited Nebraska's running offense to only 36 yards (33 m), far less than their 207.7 average, so Nebraska passed to NU receiver Terrance Nunn for a first down. Had the play ended there, Nebraska would likely have been able to run out the clock since Texas had no time-outs remaining. Before Nunn went down, Aaron Ross tackled him and used his helmet to cause a fumble.

Colt McCoy led the Longhorns through the snow flurries to the Nebraska 5. With less than a minute remaining, Nebraska leading by one point, and the Horns facing fourth down, Texas needed a field-goal to win. Johnson had already missed three kicks (two field goals and a blocked extra point) and he told Coach Brown late in the game that his leg was tightening up. Brown looked to walk-on sophomore Ryan Bailey to attempt the kick. Bailey was not listed on UT's depth chart and coach Brown later admitted he wasn't sure whether Bailey had even been on the team as a freshman. Bailey had made only 10 kicks as a high-school kicker from Anderson High School in Austin, Texas and he had never attempted a kick for the Longhorns. The trip to Nebraska was only the second time he had ever been included in the travel roster, which is limited to 64 players. Before the kick, Brown told him "You're the luckiest guy in the world. You've got a chance to be Dusty Mangum on your first kick." Mangum had scored the game-winning field goal as time expired to lift the Longhorns to victory over the Michigan Wolverines in the 2005 Rose Bowl.

Nebraska Coach Callahan used his coach's challenge to have the officials review the preceding third-down play. The play was allowed to stand as an incomplete pass, as called on the field. Brown gave Bailey a swat on the helmet and Bailey jogged onto the field and calmly made the field goal. Nebraska tried two end-zone passes, both incomplete, and Texas won the game by 2 points, 22–20. Bailey said afterwards, "Actually, the only thing I really remember about being on the field was when the offensive line turned around and said 'Let's just block for 1.3 seconds. Just give him a chance to get the ball off.'"

The win was Texas' 16th straight road game victory, extending a school record, and 19th consecutive win in conference play.

The Longhorns had several injuries during the game. Defensive starters Derek Lokey and Robert Killebrew both had to leave the game due to leg injuries. Cornerback Tarell Brown was seen limping badly after the game and kicker-punter Greg Johnson aggravated a previous injury on his fourth-quarter field goal.

Eric Ransom, a writer for The Daily Texan, dubbed the game "the comeback on the prairie" and declared the game an "instant classic". Former Longhorn quarterback Vince Young was on the sidelines for the first time since going to the NFL and he went to the Longhorn locker room afterwards to congratulate the team on the win. Representatives from the Fiesta Bowl, the game that normally takes the Big 12 Conference champion, were also on hand.

The media had speculated that Nebraska and Texas would win their respective conference divisions to play again in the Big 12 Conference Championship. This was echoed in post-game interviews as both teams voiced respect for the other. Texas coach Mack Brown said, "Nebraska is back, For them to keep coming back and back and back – they made big plays throughout the game to put themselves in a position to win." He continued, "As soon as they back away from it, they'll see that their program is back on track, one of the best in the country. And they'll be excited about a chance to go play somebody in (the Big 12 championship game). Hopefully, if we can keep playing, it might be us." Nebraska cornerback Cortney Grixby said of Texas, "They kept their composure. That's the mark of a champion. And that's what they are."

=== Texas Tech ===
	1	2	3	4	Total
Texas	0	21	7	7	35
Texas Tech	21	10	0	0	31

The Longhorns come into the game at Texas Tech with several injuries on defense. Five days prior to the game, the Longhorns announced that starting defensive tackle Derek Lokey, injured in the Nebraska game, was out indefinitely with a broken left leg. Senior defensive end Tim Crowder said. "That's huge. He's the heart and soul of our defensive line. He didn't get a lot of credit, but he was the anchor." Lokey had 24 tackles and quarterback pressures and also spent some time at fullback. Luke Tiemann will take over Lokey's fullback duties while sophomore Roy Miller will start at Lokey's spot as nose tackle. Roddrick Muckelroy, who started the first three games at linebacker, was still out indefinitely due to a ruptured finger tendon. Linebacker Robert Killebrew was listed questionable for the Texas Tech game. In addition, several defensive players had been playing with injuries. According to the Houston Chronicle, these include twin-brother safeties "Marcus Griffin (ankle) and Michael Griffin (ankle), tackle Frank Okam (knee), cornerbacks Tarell Brown (toe) and Aaron Ross (hand) and end Brian Robison (ankle)". Linebacker Drew Kelson has also been suffering from an ankle injury. The 2005 national championship team only had one game missed by a defensive starter due to injury, but the 2006 team already had thirteen missed games due to injuries or suspensions.

During Mack Brown's time at Texas, he has only lost six road games in an opponent's stadium. The Red Raiders are the only team so far to have defeated the Longhorns twice in road games, and they have done so in four-year increments with victories in 1998 and 2002. The 2002 game was lost by Texas 42–38, when defensive starters Derrick Johnson, Kalen Thornton, Marcus Tubbs and Nathan Vasher were all injured. Texas' coaching staff said that injuries are not an excuse to lose a ball game. Mack Brown said, "It's still a loss. Nobody cares. I used to talk about injuries all the time, and it does nothing good for your team. Some years you have them, and some years you don't... We've still got a chance for everything after eight games, and that's unbelievable." The most recent two Tech-Texas games had not been close score-wise, with Texas winning 51–21 in Lubbock in 2004 and 52–17 in Austin in 2005.

Texas Tech entered the game with a potent passing offense led by Sophomore quarterback Graham Harrell. He has completed 245 passes out of 356 attempts this year and he averages more than 313 passing yards per game. Just the previous week, he threw for 368 yards (336 m) and career -high six touchdowns in a 42–26 win over Iowa State and the Red Raiders are averaging 48.6 passes per game.

On the other side of the ball, the Longhorns were ranked 84th in pass defense this season, giving up 221.8 yards (202.8 m) per game. Tech senior defensive lineman Chris Hudler said Texas also possessed a powerful offense, "There is no room for error", he said. "Some teams you might be able to make mistakes and make up for them later. But they (Texas) have some of the best athletes in the country." Henry Melton, previously known as a tailback used by the Longhorns in short-yardage situations, ended up being used in the game at defensive end in an effort to give Texas more depth on defense.

Four days prior to the game, the betting line in Las Vegas casinos was Texas by 11 1/2 to 12 points. The game set a new attendance record for Texas Tech in Lubbock, with 56,158 in attendance.

Texas Tech got off to a quick start, outscoring the Longhorns 21–0 in the first quarter. Harrell compiled 364 passing yards and three touchdown passes against the Longhorn pass defense during the first half. That was more yards passing than Texas had previously given up during an entire game in the course of the 2006 season to date. Texas responded by outscoring Texas Tech 21–10 in the second quarter so that Tech led by 10 points at half-time.

By the end of the game, Texas Tech had completed 519 yards (475 m) passing. This was only 14 yards (13 m) short of the record for most-ever passing yardage against the Longhorns which was set by David Klinger of the University of Houston in 1992. Nevertheless, Tech found themselves trailing 35–31 with 4:24 left in the game and facing fourth down at the Texas 15-yard (14 m) line. According to UT's Brian Robison, "We recognized from the [offensive lines] splits that it was going to be a quarterback sneak," Texas stopped Graham Harrell to take possession of the football. Texas in turn was facing a third down and five yards-to-go with one and a half minutes left in the game. McCoy dropped back to pass but was under pressure from the defense. He first ran right and then revered direction to break into the open for a 34-yard (31 m) gain before sliding down in the field of play.

Playing with a busted lip since early in the game, Colt McCoy ended up with 256 passing yards and four touchdowns. He also contributed career-best 68 rushing yards, including the 33-yard (30 m) scramble that helped seal the victory. The win may have had added significance for McCoy since he grew up only two hours from Lubbock, attended Tuscola Jim Ned high school, and is dating a Texas Tech student who serves as a recruiter for the Red Raiders football team. Although McCoy has now completed 24 touchdowns (2 shy of the UT single season record) he is known for shunning the limelight, preferring to give credit to his coaches and teammates. Former Texas wide receiver Roy Williams, who attended the game on the sidelines, said of McCoy "And you know what the scary thing is? He's not even good yet."

For Texas, coming back to win the game from a 21–0 deficit was the second biggest comeback win in school history and the biggest comeback ever in a road game. The Longhorns over came four turn-overs they committed during the win. For Texas Tech, the loss was only the third loss under Coach Leach when the Raiders held a lead at half-time. The 519 yards (475 m) passing by Graham Harrell was a career-best. Wide receiver Jarrett Hicks had nine catches and the most receiving yards in the game at 156, but he left the game with an apparent head injury early in the second half. After the game, the Lubbock Avalanche-Journal interviewed fans and reported "Many agreed that it was the most exciting game of the year, citing the big crowd and enthusiasm in the stadium."

After one pass interference penalty against the Red Raider, Tech defensive back Darcel McBath threw his mouthpiece towards the officials. After the game, Texas Tech coach Mike Leach implied that there may have been mistakes made by the officiating crew. He said, "There were some things that happened in the course of the game, in particular the second half, that were outside of our control that I'm not able to comment on that were very detrimental to our effort." Leach sent Big Twelve Conference officials a video tape showing 18 calls, no calls, or other rulings that were disputed by Texas Tech. The disputed play-calls include plays accounting for more than half of the penalty yardage assessed against Tech as well the spot of the ball following a 14-yard (13 m) fourth down pass on Tech's penultimate drive of the game. The officials said that play came up less than a yard short of the first down marker, giving Texas the ball.

=== Oklahoma State ===
	1	2	3	4	Total
Oklahoma State	0	3	7	0	10
Texas	3	17	10	6	36

With the win over Texas Tech combined with the USC Trojans losing to the Oregon State Beavers, Texas moved up one spot to No. 4 in the Associated Press and Coach's polls. According to Fox Sports columnist Eric Moneypenny, "...we're gonna be left with Ohio State or Michigan against Texas. Maybe West Virginia can stay the course and somehow stay above Texas in the standings, but it seems doubtful should Texas run the table and win the Big 12." Texas got no boost in the BCS rankings however, as they passed USC but were passed by idle Louisville to remain at number seven in the BCS.

In each of the preceding four games, Texas trailed their opponent for at least part of the game and managed to come back to win. This includes fourth quarter come-backs against Nebraska and Texas Tech. The win over Texas Tech was the biggest road come-back in UT's history, and the second biggest come-back ever. The biggest was against the Oklahoma State Cowboys in 2004 in Austin.

The week prior to the 2006 game against Texas the Cowboys had scored 28 unanswered points in a come-from-behind upset of the Nebraska Cornhuskers.

=== Kansas State ===
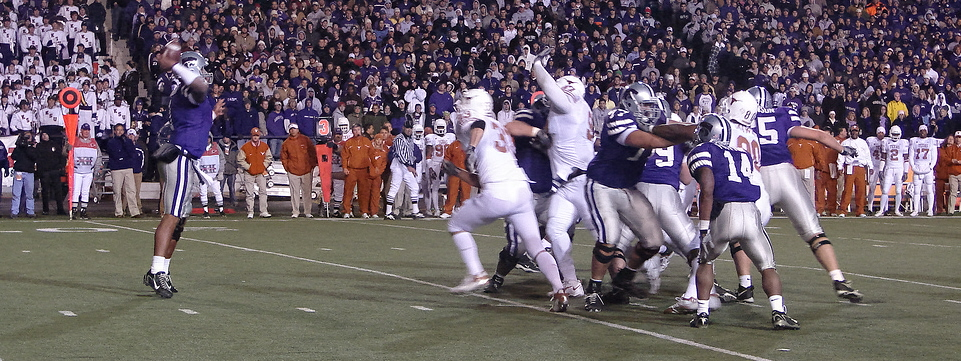
Josh Freeman uses all of his 6'6 frame to pass over the Texas line.

	1	2	3	4	Total
Texas	7	7	14	14	42
Kansas State	7	14	21	3	45

The day of the game, the betting line in Las Vegas casinos favored then #4 ranked Texas by 16 points against an unranked 6–4 Kansas State team. Kansas State won the coin toss and elected to kick. The kick was a touchback and Texas made 4 first downs in a 10 play drive from the Texas 20 to the Kansas State 1, where Texas had their fifth first-down of the game. Two rushing plays by tailback Selvin Young were unsuccessful, as was a third down carry by red-shirt freshman quarterback Colt McCoy. On fourth down from the Kansas State 1 yard-line, Texas again opted to keep the ball in the hands of McCoy. He made the touchdown on a run up the middle, but was buried in a pile of defenders. McCoy came off the field holding his right shoulder and then was seen wincing in pain as trainers attended to him on the sideline. He was taken into the locker room for further evaluation and returned to the sideline in the first half, where he threw some warm-up passes. However, McCoy never re-entered the game and freshman quarterback Jevan Snead played the rest of the game in McCoy's place.

Kansas State tied the game in the first quarter off of a 36-yard (33 m) touchdown pass from quarterback Josh Freeman to wide receiver Yamon Figurs. Jamaal Charles would regain the lead again for the Longhorns early in the second quarter with a one-yard (1 m) touchdown run, however Kansas State quickly regained the lead in the second, with a surprising 21–14 lead at half-time off of a 32-yard (29 m) touchdown pass from Josh Freeman to running back James Johnson and an 8-yard (7.3 m) touchdown run from running back Leon Patton. Texas managed to briefly tie the game 21–21 three minutes into the third quarter off of a 5-yard (4.6 m) touchdown run from Selvin Young, one play after Michael Griffin blocked Kansas State punter Tim Reyer's punt and Tyrell Gatewood recovered. But on the Longhorns' next drive, Charles fumbled at Kansas State's 20, this would lead to the beginning of Kansas State's 21 straight points in a span of 3:06 to take a 42–21 lead. Kansas State's Ian Campbell recovered the fumble, and it led to Leon Patton's 18-yard (16 m) halfback pass to wide receiver Cedric Wilson for a 28–21 lead. After Selvin Young fumbled on the second play of the Longhorns' next possession, and Campbell recovered again. Josh Freeman's 30-yard (27 m) pass to Yamon Figurs then put the Wildcats up 35–21. With the following possession by Texas, quarterback Jevan Snead threw three straight incompletions, leading to the Texas punt team coming onto the field, however Kansas State's John McCardle blocked Texas punters Greg Johnson's punt and Daniel Gonzalez recovered at the Kansas State 23. That led to Josh Freeman's 1-yard (0.91 m) TD run to make it 42–21 lead.

Texas mounted a partial comeback near the end of the 3rd quarter with a 75 scoring drive that ended with an 18-yard (16 m) run by Jamaal Charles and a touchdown pass to Limas Sweed early in the 4th quarter to giving the Longhorns a chance, however Kansas State had other ideas as Kansas State kicker Jeff Snodgrass connected on a clutch 51-yard (47 m) field goal with 3:19 left to give the Wildcats some breathing room. Texas' Chris Ogbonnaya's 1-yard (0.91 m) touchdown run with 1:36 left in the 4th quarter cut the Kansas State lead to 45–42, putting the Longhorns within a field goal's reach. With one minute forty-three seconds remaining in the game and Texas trailing 45–42, Texas attempted an onside kick. The kick was recovered by Kansas Statewide receiver Jordy Nelson, who then caught a 6-yard (5.5 m) pass for a first down allowing Kansas State to run out the clock to win the game.

Following the game, Texas revealed that X-rays, taken during the game, of McCoy's shoulder were negative. His injury was described as a pinched nerve or stinger. UT trainer Kenny Boyd explained why McCoy did not re-enter the game: "After the injury, Colt experienced shoulder weakness and neck pain," Boyd said. "When evaluating injuries, we look for return of normal strength and a reduction of pain before putting a player back into the game. Colt wasn't released to play because his symptoms, including strength, did not improve." His mother, Debra McCoy, confirmed the nature of the injury and said that the extra time off prior to the game against Texas A&M should give Colt a chance to recover. Colt McCoy said in a statement, "I'm really disappointed I wasn't able to be in there helping my teammates, but I'm going to be fine. The off week couldn't come at a better time. I'll do everything it takes to get back."

This defeat snapped the Longhorns 17 win streak on the road as well as the national best 21-game conference winning steak. Texas dropped in the AP Poll from No. 4 to No. 11 and from No. 5 to No. 13 in the BCS rankings Since the inception of the BCS in 1998 no team has entered the championship game with more than one loss, so Texas' chances of repeating as national champion were considered eliminated after taking this second loss on the season. The game has the distinction of being the most points ever scored by a UT team in a losing effort.

=== Texas A&M ===
	1	2	3	4	Total
Texas A&M	6	0	0	6	12
Texas	0	0	7	0	7

This game marked the 113th meeting between Texas and the Texas A&M Aggies in college football and the game is part of a multi-sport rivalry called the Lone Star Showdown. It is the Longhorns' longest-running rivalry and Texas led the series, 73–34–5, including the last six in a row. During the week before the game, the Longhorns conducted their traditional Hex Rally while the Aggies had an off-campus version of their traditional Bonfire and also staged a parade just prior to the game. The Longhorns announced that starting quarterback Colt McCoy, who was injured in the game against Kansas State, was cleared to play the game against the Aggies.

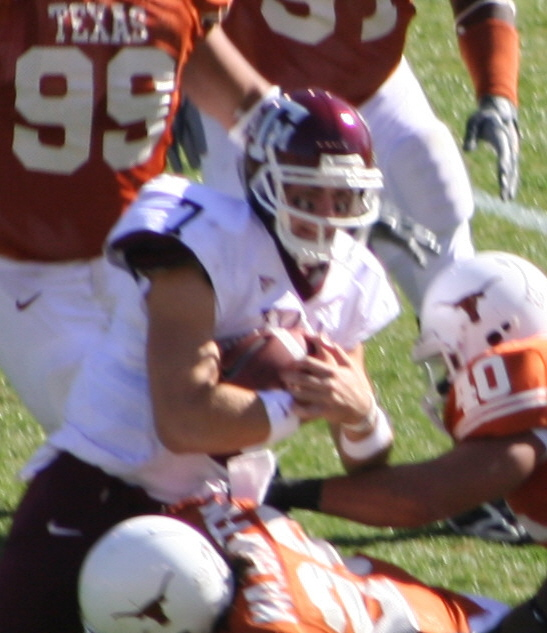
Texas tackles Stephen McGee.

Since the series began in 1894 it has traditionally been played on Thanksgiving Day or Thanksgiving weekend. The 2006 game marked the thirteenth straight game to be scheduled the day after Thanksgiving. On Thanksgiving Day (one day prior to the game), the sports line in Vegas casinos had Texas favored by 13 to 13 1/2 points while the weather forecast called for mostly sunny skies, a high near 81 °F (27 °C), and winds up to 15 miles per hour (24 km/h) from the South. The 2006 meeting was the first time in eight years that both teams entered the game with at least eight wins. Going back to 1999 when UT lost the final three games of the season, the Longhorns had gone 87 games without losing back-to-back games. That was the longest active streak for any college or professional football team.

During 2006, the Texas A&M defensive coordinator was Gary Darnell who had been fired as defensive coordinator at the University of Texas under John Mackovic.

For the third time during the season, the pre-game activities consisted of a military flyby. Unlike the first two, which featured jets, this one was performed by AH-1 Cobra helicopters from the Marine Light Attack Helicopter Squadron HMLA-773 from Atlanta. Texas A&M won the coin toss and deferred, Texas elected to receive, and Texas A&M chose to defend the south end-zone. Kick-off was delayed while ABC side-line reporter Stacey Dales did her pre-game report from the north end-zone. Soccer star Mia Hamm was spotted in the audience rooting for Texas.

Texas's first drive of the game ended when Henry Melton was stopped on a fourth-and-one run at the Aggie eight-yard (7 m) line. The Aggies drove the ball the length of the field to score a touchdown, but missed on the extra point to leave the game at 6–0.

With about four minutes to play in the first half, McCoy connected with Limas Sweed for an apparent five-yard (5 m) touchdown pass. However, Sweed was flagged for offensive pass interference which the Austin American-Statesman later suggested was "questionable". According to the Austin American-Statesman, the refs "blew the call" stating that replays showed that Sweed was involved in some "spirited hand checking while the ball was in the air, but neither player appeared to push or be guilty of interference". All three broadcasters working the game for ABC also initially spoke out against the penalty call, although later acknowledging that enough interference had occurred to justify the call. In an ABC half-time interview, Mack Brown said "I thought it was a bad call," but added "There's nothing we can do about that. We should've done a better job on third down."

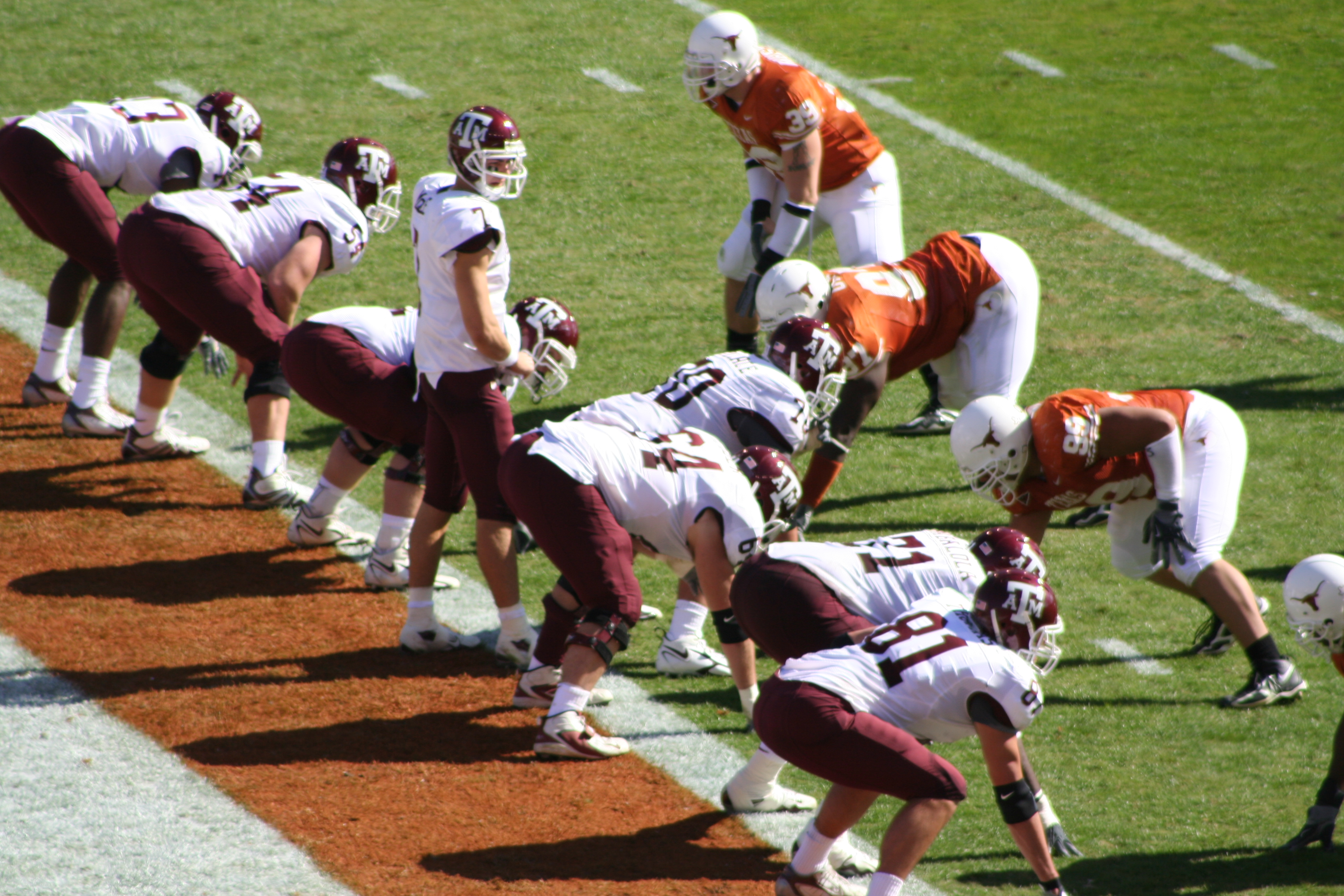
Texas A&M takes over at their goal line after a Colt McCoy interception in the first half

Immediately after the penalty, Colt McCoy threw an interception near the Texas A&M goal line and the Aggies ran out the clock to take the 6–0 lead into half-time. The zero score marked the first time the Longhorns had been held scoreless in the first half of play since the 2004 season.

The only score in the third quarter was a rushing touchdown by Jamaal Charles, his seventh of the season.

In the fourth quarter, Texas A&M made a long-drive that took up nearly nine minutes. Texas A&M quarterback Stephen McGee was playing so hard that he was throwing up during the game, but he managed to make an 8-yard (7.3 m) touchdown run with 2:32 left to play. A&M was unable to convert their two-point attempt after the touchdown.

With 1:21 seconds left in the game and Texas trailing 12–7, McCoy threw his third interception of the game. Following the change of possession and sometime near the whistle signalling the end of the play on the field, Aggie Kellen Heard knocked McCoy to the ground as McCoy walked along the field unbuckling his chin strap. Heard was ejected from the game as a result of the "cheap-shot late hit" and the Aggies were penalized fifteen yards (14 m). McCoy was later quoted as saying that the tackle had not been a cheap shot. Texas A&M's coach Dennis Franchione later apologized for what he called a "late hit" saying "We do not teach this type of play or condone it." Texas held the Aggies to three-and-out and used all three of their time-outs in order to preserve game time. Texas got the ball back with 48 seconds left in the game.

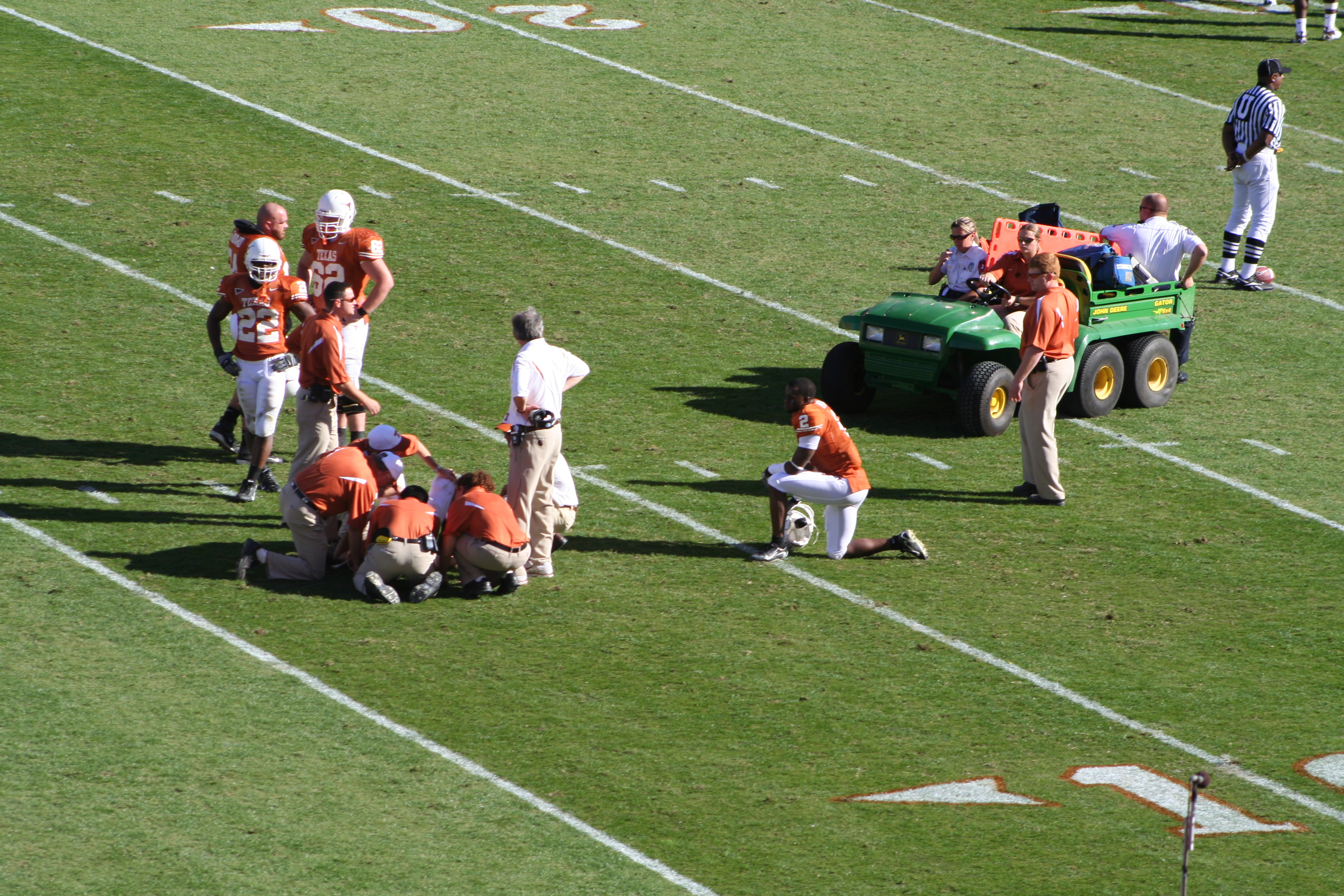
Colt McCoy injured

With 20 seconds remaining in the game, McCoy was injured by a "vicious, stadium hushing tackle" as Aggies defensive end Michael Bennett connected with his helmet under McCoy's jaw just as McCoy released a pass. Replays shown both on television and in the stadium revealed the hit included "helmet-to-helmet" contact which, if intentional, is illegal in NCAA football. No flag was thrown on the play. When the replay was shown in the stadium, the Longhorn fans erupted in boos before lapsing back into silence as McCoy lay on the ground for 10 minutes before being taken off the field on a cart. Mack Brown said after the game "I didn't see it, but it sounded like 88,000 (fans) thought it was dirty." Fellow Longhorn Selvin Young said he thought the hit was clean calling it a "textbook hit". McCoy was taken to Brackenridge Hospital where he spent more than three hours undergoing an evaluation that included an X-ray, MRI, and a CAT scan. Longhorns trainer Kenny Boyd said the injury was a severe pinched nerve in McCoy's neck. Boyd said that McCoy was expected to make a full recovery, but no timetable was set for McCoy to return to play. Colt McCoy, in a November 2007 interview, stated that neither this nor the earlier Heard tackle had been cheap shots.

Following the injury to McCoy, back-up quarterback Jevan Snead threw an interception on his first play of the game. With the clock rolling on the change of possession, time expired without the Aggies needing to take a play.

The Aggies amassed 244 rushing yards against the nation's top-ranked rushing defense. Texas, normally a potent running team, produced only four rushing first downs and did not have a single run longer than nine yards (8.2 m). Jamaal Charles, in a later interview, stated "We were looking weak. We thought they'd let up because we're Texas." The 12–7 victory was the first win for the Aggies in Austin in 12 years. "They shattered all our dreams", declared Longhorn defensive end Brian Orakpo. The game was the 40th consecutive home sell-out for the Longhorns and Justin Blalock became the first player in Texas history to start 50 consecutive game.

=== Alamo Bowl ===
	1	2	3	4	Total
Texas	3	7	10	6	26
Iowa	14	0	7	3	24

With their loss to Texas A&M, Texas looked North to the Oklahoma vs Oklahoma State Bedlam Series Rivalry. If the Oklahoma State Cowboys had defeated the Sooners, then Texas would still have played in the Big 12 Championship Game with a chance to play in the Fiesta Bowl. That is because both the Longhorns and the Sooners would have had a 6–2 conference record, but the Longhorns would have won the tie-breaker by virtue of winning the head-to-head game against Oklahoma. Oklahoma won the game, however, so the next game for Texas would be their bowl bid. Speculation on which bowl would choose them originally centered on the Cotton Bowl Classic or Gator Bowl on New Year's Day; the Holiday Bowl or the Alamo Bowl.

Meanwhile, Longhorn defensive coordinator Gene Chizik accepted the head-coaching job at Iowa State University and did not participate in coaching the Longhorns in the Alamo Bowl. Also, on November 29, 2006, the Austin American-Statesman cited unnamed sources saying back-up quarterback Jevan Snead would transfer from Texas. On December 1, 2006, the Longhorns issued a statement confirming that Snead, along with sophomore defensive end Chris Brown and sophomore offensive tackle Greg Dolan, had left the team and would transfer to unspecified schools.

On December 3, 2006, Texas officially accepted a bid to play in the Alamo Bowl against the unranked University of Iowa Hawkeyes, who were 6–6 overall and finished in eighth place in the Big Ten conference with only two conference victories. The Alamo Bowl is played in the 65,000-seat Alamodome in San Antonio, Texas on December 30, 2006. Offensive coordinator Greg Davis spoke about the prospects at quarterback, should Colt McCoy not be ready to play:

Matt McCoy, a senior walk-on, is a young man that has been working for the last three or four years. We would certainly not take a redshirt off Sherrod Harris at this point; it would be unfair for him because he has sat this year with the idea that he'll start the spring as a redshirt freshman. And then Mack (Brown) and I will sit down and discuss the possibility of an emergency situation as we've done in the past; one year Tony Jeffrey worked as quarterback for us because he had played quarterback in high school. So we'll sit down and look at some different options as to which way we would go. It would certainly be somebody that we think can run the offense and have a limited package for those guys. I don't think we'll need an emergency quarterback, but we'll certainly have a third guy ready.

On December 21, 2006, Colt McCoy was cleared to play in the Alamo Bowl. McCoy did start and played the entire game for Texas. The game was a back-and-forth affair with the 2006 Iowa Hawkeyes football team largely dominating most of the first half and Texas the second. Texas won the game 26–24. The attendance for the game was 65,875, which established a new record for the most people to gather in San Antonio to view a sporting event.

== After the season ==
The Longhorns received a final-ranking of 13th in the nation by both the Associated Press AP Poll and the USA Today Coaches Poll They were ranked 19th in the Bowl Championship Series (BCS) rankings, which were issued prior to the bowl season.

Seven members of this team were selected by professional football teams in the 2007 NFL draft – Michael Griffin (number 19 overall), Aaron Ross (number 20 overall), Justin Blalock (number 39 overall), Tim Crowder (number 56 overall), Brian Robison (number 102 overall), Tarell Brown (number 147 overall), Kasey Studdard (number 183 overall). Lyle Sendlein and Selvin Young were not drafted but signed with NFL teams as free agents.
