= 2006 Minnesota Golden Gophers football team =

American college football season

2006 Minnesota Golden Gophers football

Insight Bowl, L 41–44 ^{OT} vs. Texas Tech
- Conference: Big Ten Conference
- Record: 6–7 (3–5 Big Ten)
- Head coach: Glen Mason (10th season)
- Co-offensive coordinators: Mitch Browning (7th season); Tony Petersen (7th season)
- Defensive coordinator: David Lockwood (2nd season)
- Captains: Mike Sherels; Matt Spaeth
- Home stadium: Hubert H. Humphrey Metrodome

2006 Big Ten Conference football standings
	Conf.			Overall
Team	W		L	W		L
No. 2 Ohio State $	8	–	0	12	–	1
No. 8 Michigan %	7	–	1	11	–	2
No. 7 Wisconsin	7	–	1	12	–	1
No. 24 Penn State	5	–	3	9	–	4
Purdue	5	–	3	8	–	6
Minnesota	3	–	5	6	–	7
Indiana	3	–	5	5	–	7
Northwestern	2	–	6	4	–	8
Iowa	2	–	6	6	–	7
Illinois	1	–	7	2	–	10
Michigan State	1	–	7	4	–	8
$ – BCS representative as conference champion; % – BCS at-large representative; Rankings from AP Poll

The 2006 Minnesota Golden Gophers football team represented the University of Minnesota as a member of the Big Ten Conference during the 2006 NCAA Division I FBS football season. In their tenth and final year under head coach Glen Mason, the Golden Gophers compiled an overall record of 6–7 with a mark of 3–5 in conference play, tying for sixth place in the Big Ten. Minnesota was invited to the Insight Bowl, where the Golden Gophers lost to Texas Tech. The team played home games at the Hubert H. Humphrey Metrodome in Minneapolis.

Mason was fired on December 31, two days after the Gophers' epic collapse in the last 20 minutes of the Insight Bowl against Texas Tech, in which Minnesota blew a 38–7 lead to lose 44–41 in overtime. The comeback was the biggest in NCAA Division I Football Bowl Subdivision (FBS) postseason history.

== Schedule ==
Date	Time	Opponent	Site	TV	Result	Attendance	Source
August 31	6:30 pm	at Kent State*	Dix Stadium; Kent, OH	ESPN360	W 44–0	20,126	
September 9	6:00 pm	at No. 22 California*	California Memorial Stadium; Berkeley, CA	TBS	L 17–42	55,035	
September 16	1:00 pm	Temple*	Hubert H. Humphrey Metrodome; Minneapolis, MN		W 62–0	45,612	
September 23	11:00 am	at Purdue	Ross–Ade Stadium; West Lafayette, IN	ESPN2	L 21–27	54,620	
September 30	7:00 pm	No. 6 Michigan	Hubert H. Humphrey Metrodome; Minneapolis, MN (Little Brown Jug)	ESPN	L 14–28	50,805	
October 7	11:00 am	Penn State	Hubert H. Humphrey Metrodome; Minneapolis, MN (Governor's Victory Bell)	ESPN Plus	L 27–28 ^{OT}	45,227	
October 14	11:00 am	at No. 25 Wisconsin	Camp Randall Stadium; Madison, WI (rivalry)	ESPN	L 12–48	82,010	
October 21	2:30 pm	North Dakota State*	Hubert H. Humphrey Metrodome; Minneapolis, MN	ESPN Plus	W 10–9	62,845	
October 28	2:30 pm	at No. 1 Ohio State	Ohio Stadium; Columbus, OH	ABC	L 0–44	105,443	
November 4	11:00 am	Indiana^{†}	Hubert H. Humphrey Metrodome; Minneapolis, MN	ESPN360	W 63–26	44,610	
November 11	11:00 am	at Michigan State	Spartan Stadium; East Lansing, MI	ESPNU	W 31–18	64,807	
November 18	11:00 am	Iowa	Hubert H. Humphrey Metrodome; Minneapolis, MN (rivalry)	ESPN Plus	W 34–24	64,140	
December 29	7:00 pm	vs. Texas Tech*	Sun Devil Stadium; Tempe, AZ (Insight Bowl)	NFLN	L 41–44 ^{OT}	48,391	
*Non-conference game; ^{†}Homecoming; Rankings from AP Poll released prior to the game; All times are in Central time

== Game summaries ==
=== Kent State ===
	1	2	3	4	Total
Golden Gophers	14	3	21	6	44
Golden Flashes	0	0	0	0	0

This was the season opener for the Minnesota Golden Gophers. It was played on a Thursday in Kent, Ohio in Dix Stadium. The Golden Gophers were quite successful in the game, scoring on seven of their ten drives. The Golden Gophers dominated this game from the start of the game to the finish. Converted linebacker Alex Daniels rushed for 155 yards and 3 touchdowns. Kent State additionally had six of their ten drives ended by turnovers. Minnesota averaged a starting position of their own 36 yard line, 16 yards better than the Golden Flashes. This game was a homecoming for Minnesota head coach Glen Mason, whose first head coaching job was at Kent State.

Kent State is currently 6–5.

=== California ===
	1	2	3	4	Total
Golden Gophers	7	10	0	0	17
Golden Bears	7	21	7	7	42

The Golden Gophers faced off against their first team from a BCS since the 2000 season, and the first time the Minnesota Golden Gophers faced off against a team from the Pac-10 in the regular season since 1988. The Golden Gophers and Golden Bears remained close until the California scored twice in a three-minute span in the second quarter. The Gophers did manage a field-goal to close the second half, but were unable to find the red-zone in the second half. Golden Gophers quarterback Bryan Cupito did manage to pass for 243 yards with a 64% completion percentage. However, he had two interceptions and no touchdowns. Dominic Jones did manage to score on a kick-off return.

California is currently 8–3.

=== Temple ===
	1	2	3	4	Total
Owls	0	0	0	0	0
Golden Gophers	28	17	7	10	62

The Golden Gophers had their highest scoring game since September 2003, as they dominated the Temple Owls. The Golden Gophers were led by Bryan Cupito, who had 8 completions on 10 attempts, with 148 yards passing and 4 touchdowns. Additionally, the Gopher rushing attack combined for 284 yards rushing. Temple only twice advanced into Minnesota's side of the field. Additionally, the starting position of the Owls was 29 yards worse than the Golden Gophers. The win was the Gophers' twelfth straight victory in a home opener.

Temple finished the 2006 season 1–11.

=== Purdue ===
	1	2	3	4	Total
Golden Gophers	7	0	7	7	21
Boilermakers	3	7	10	7	27

The Golden Gophers opened up the 2006 Big Ten season against Purdue. The Gophers had beat the Boilermakers in a double-overtime game the previous season. Amir Pinnix rushed for 183 yards on the day, but did not score once. Notably, the Gophers and Boilermakers had identical amounts of offensive output (421 yards). But the Golden Gophers turned the ball over twice, in comparison to no turnovers for the Boilermakers. Purdue was led by Curtis Painter who completed 67% of his passes for 243 yards and 2 touchdowns. This game marked the first time the Gophers had lost their first Big Ten game of the season since 2002, when they lost to Purdue.

=== Michigan ===
	1	2	3	4	Total
Wolverines	7	14	0	7	28
Golden Gophers	0	7	0	7	14

Minnesota came into the oldest trophy game in college football with a rare opportunity. The Gophers had not won two straight games against the University of Michigan since 1962 and 1963. Michigan came into the game highly ranked in both the AP and Coaches Polls. The Golden Gophers did manage to not turn the ball over in the game, but they didn't force any turnovers either. The Wolverines did rack up nearly 200 more yards of offense in the game. Bryan Cupito led the Gophers, passing for 215 yards and 2 touchdowns. He was outdone, however, by Michigan's Chad Henne, who passed for 284 yards and 3 touchdowns. Converting third-down attempts also hurt the Golden Gophers, as Minnesota went 3 for 12 in 3rd down conversions. In comparison, Michigan went 10 for 15.

=== Penn State ===
	1	2	3	4	OT	Total
Nittany Lions	7	7	0	7	7	28
Golden Gophers	7	0	0	14	6	27

Minnesota had another trophy on the line, as the Golden Gophers and the Nittany Lions squared off in the Metrodome. The two teams traded the lead back and forth until the game knotted at 21 all. The Golden Gophers had the first possession of over time, and scored, but missed the extra point. Penn State then had their opportunity. Controversy stuck as Penn State found themselves in a fourth and nine situation in overtime. The pass was incomplete, but the ruling on the field was defensive pass interference, giving Penn State a fresh set of downs. There were widespread rumors on the internet that the Big Ten apologized for the alleged blown call, but this was denied by the conference. Penn State went on to score and convert their extra point, winning by one point.

=== Wisconsin ===
	1	2	3	4	Total
Golden Gophers	3	0	2	7	12
Badgers	14	14	13	7	48

Minnesota had their third straight week playing for a rivalry trophy, as they faced off against heated rival, Wisconsin. The highly ranked Badgers made quick work of the Golden Gophers, racing to a 28–3 lead by the half. Amir Pinnix rushed for 97 yards on the day, but Golden Gopher quarterback Bryan Cupito had only 94 yards passing on 28 attempts. The Gophers had far more problems converting on third downs as well, converting 3 of 14 attempts, compared to Wisconsin's 6 of 10 ratio. The Badgers held onto Paul Bunyan's Axe for the third straight year.

=== North Dakota State ===
	1	2	3	4	Total
Bison	3	0	3	3	9
Golden Gophers	0	3	0	7	10

Minnesota took a break from Big Ten play, hosting regional rival North Dakota State. The Bison outgained the Gophers in offensive yards by 140 yards. Each team missed two field goal tries in the game, North Dakota State missing a try as time expired. Bryan Cupito passed for 150 yards on 14 completions. Amir Pinnix racked up 97 yards and one touch down. Minnesota benefited from the great punting, as Minnesota's Justin Kucek had six punts and averaged 47.6 yards per punt.

=== Ohio State ===
	1	2	3	4	Total
Golden Gophers	0	0	0	0	0
Buckeyes	10	7	13	14	44

The Golden Gophers ran into the buzz saw that was the 2006 Ohio State Buckeyes, and came away dominated. The Gophers gave up over two hundred more yards than they gained on the day offensively. The Golden Gophers were led offensively by Byran Cupito who passed for 120 yards on 13 completions. Minnesota's Deon Hightower recorded 13 tackles on the day. The Gophers were 4 of 14 on third down, while the Buckeyes were 7 of 10.

=== Indiana ===
	1	2	3	4	Total
Hoosiers	0	7	13	6	26
Golden Gophers	21	14	7	21	63

The Golden Gophers went into Indiana, facing a stiff tasking, knowing they needed to win their final three games to become bowl eligible. Their first task was to beat Indiana for the second straight game. The Golden Gophers raced out to a 35-point lead halfway into the second quarter on the way to a 63-26 route. Bryan Cupito went 22 of 33, and 378 yards with 4 touchdowns. Golden Gopher receivers Logan Payne and Ernie Wheelwright both eclipsed 100 yards receiving on the day. It was the most points scored since their season opening victory over Toledo in 2004.

=== Michigan State ===
	1	2	3	4	Total
Golden Gophers	0	17	7	7	31
Spartans	9	0	3	6	18

In their final regular season road trip of the season, Minnesota traveled to East Lansing, Michigan. Michigan State opened up a nine-point lead in the first quarter. The Gophers scored the next 17 points on their way to victory. Bryan Cupito passed for 243 yards. Golden Gopher running back Amir Pinnix added 113 yards offensively on the day. The win kept the Golden Gophers bowl hopes alive going into their final regular season game.

=== Iowa ===
	1	2	3	4	Total
Hawkeyes	7	10	0	7	24
Golden Gophers	6	14	7	7	34

The battle for Floyd of Rosedale took place with two teams looking at two different goals. The Hawkeyes were attempting to stop a losing skid, while the Gophers were looking to win their third straight game and to become bowl eligible. Several offensive players on each side had big days. Iowa's Drew Tate passed for 354 yards, and Hawkeye running back Albert Young rushed for 133 yards. For the Golden Gophers, Bryan Cupito passed for 267 yards, while Minnesota running back Amir Pinnix rushed for 119 yards. Turnovers proved to be crucial on the day, as Minnesota had a plus four turnover ratio. The win gave Minnesota a 6–6 record and made them bowl eligible.

=== Texas Tech ===
	1	2	3	4	OT	Total
Red Raiders	0	7	7	24	6	44
Golden Gophers	14	21	3	0	3	41

In the 2006 Insight Bowl, the Gophers would score early and often. In the first quarter, QB Bryan Cupito threw a two-yard pass to tight end Jack Simmons to give the Gophers a 7–0 lead. Texas Tech responded by driving within the Minnesota 10, Graham Harrell, the Tech QB, fumbled on a sack and Minnesota responded with their longest drive of the season.

The Gophers extended the lead on a 14-yard pass from Cupito to Ernie Wheelwright, which came off the a touchback by Tech, when it appeared they would score to trim the lead. Tech got on the board with 4:32 left in the first half when they scored on a 1-yard run by Shannon Woods However, the Gophers would score one more touchdown in the first half, off Cupito's third touchdown of the game, a 3-yard pass to Logan Payne with 32 seconds left in the first half. The Gophers led 35–7 at the half.

In the 2nd half, Minnesota added to their lead with a 32-yard field goal by Joel Monroe to make it 38–7. However, Texas Tech began their miracle comeback on the ensuing drive when Harrell hit Joel Filani on a 43-yard pass to cut the lead to 38–14.

To start the 4th quarter, Harrell hit Robert Johnson to cut the lead to 38–21. To respond, Minnesota drove down to the Tech 31, however, coach Glen Mason decided to go for it on a 4th-and-seven from the 31, and Cupito was subsequently sacked. Tech responded when Harrell ran a QB sneak to cut the score to 38–28. Minnesota then went 3-and-out, followed by a 40-yard punt return by Tech punt returner Danny Amendola. Nine plays after the return, Shannon Woods scored on a 1-yard run to cut the lead to a mere field goal, 38–35. They subsequently failed on the onside kick, and Minnesota recovered. Despite having to use two timeouts, they forced another 3-and-out. However, the punt coupled with a false start left Tech at their own seven, forcing Tech to use their two-minute offense that got them down to the Minnesota 35. From there, Tech kicker Alex Trlica nailed a 52-yard field goal, tying the game as time expired.

To start overtime, the Gophers kicked a 32-yard field goal to get the lead back at 41–38. However, the Red Raiders would move downfield and they would cap off their comeback when Woods scored his third touchdown of the game from three yards out to give Tech a 44–41 victory.

The Insight Bowl turned out to be coach Glen Mason's final game as head coach, as, two days after the collapse, athletic director Joel Maturi fired Mason citing that, had the collapse not happened, Mason would likely still have the job.

== Roster ==
Quarterbacks: 3 Bryan Cupito – senior; 8 Adam Weber – freshman; 11 Mike Frankberg – senior; 13 Ben Gaither – freshman; 17 Tony Mortenson – sophomore; 19 Mike Maciejowski – sophomore; Running backs: 6 Alex Daniels – sophomore; 25 Jay Thomas – (redshirt) freshman; 26 Reid Haviland – (redshirt) freshman; 27 Terrance Sherrer – freshman; 29 Amir Pinnix – junior; 33 Ken Thompson – freshman; 34 E.J. Jones – freshman; 40 Judd Smith – (redshirt) freshman; Fullbacks: 18 Justin Valentine – junior; 45 Thomas Hennessey – (redshirt) freshman; 49 Jeremy Faue – junior; Wide receivers: 1 Ernie Wheelwright – junior; 7 Eric Decker – (redshirt) freshman; 12 Mike Chambers – (redshirt) freshman; 13 Ben Kuznia – (redshirt) freshman; 28 Damola Ogundipe – freshman; 38 Andy Metz – (redshirt) freshman; 82 Marcus Sherels – freshman; 83 Ben Fischer – freshman; 84 Logan Payne – senior; 87 Michael Kasten – sophomore; Tight ends: 80 Jack Simmons – sophomore; 85 Chris Mensen – (redshirt) freshman; 86 Troy Reilly – (redshirt) freshman; 89 Matt Spaeth – senior	Centers: 53 D.J. Burris – freshman; 55 Brad Bultman – junior; 77 Tony Brinkhaus – junior; Offensive guards: 56 Tyson Swaggert – senior; 66 Nedward Tavale – (redshirt) freshman; 69 John Jakel – junior; 71 Belal Shouman – freshman; 74 Ryan Ruckdashel – (redshirt) freshman; 75 Otis Hudson – (redshirt) freshman; Offensive tackles: 60 Matt Krueger – (redshirt) freshman; 63 Andy Brinkhaus – freshman; 64 Steve Shidell – junior; 73 Jason Meinke – (redshirt) freshman; 76 Dominic Alford – freshman; 78 Joe Ainslie – senior; 79 Matt DeGeest – sophomore; Defensive tackles: 50 Dan Kinsella – freshman; 52 Jeff Tow-Arnett – (redshirt) freshman; 70 Todd Meisel – junior; 90 Eric Clark – senior; 96 Matt Stommes – (redshirt) freshman; 98 Neel Allen – junior; 99 Garrett Brown – freshman; Defensive line: 94 Willie Dyson – freshman; 95 Sean McWhirter – freshman; 97 Robert McField – freshman; Defensive ends: 52 Raymond Henderson – freshman; 65 William Brody – sophomore; 79 Barrett Moen – (redshirt) freshman; 81 Nick Tow-Arnett – (redshirt) freshman; 91 William Van DeSteeg – sophomore; 92 Steve Davis – sophomore	Linebackers: 16 John Carlson – sophomore; 30 Lee Campbell – freshman; 32 Nathan Triplett – (redshirt) freshman; 33 Tommy Becker – freshman; 38 Ryan Turry – freshman; 40 Michael Hart – freshman; 44 Deon Hightower – sophomore; 45 Mike Wey – freshman; 46 John Shevlin – junior; 48 Mario Reese – senior; 57 Patrick Cheney – junior; 58 Mike Sherels – junior; 59 Steve Moore – junior; Cornerbacks: 9 Keith Massey – (redshirt) freshman; 11 Desi Steib – junior; 13 Michael McKelton – (redshirt) freshman; 15 Jamal Harris – junior; Strong safeties: 2 Dominic Jones – sophomore; 24 Brody Grandas – sophomore; 28 Kevin Mannion – sophomore; Free safeties: 19 Tim Soliday – (redshirt) freshman; 23 Dominique Barber – junior; 35 Seth Thompson – junior; Defensive backs: 4 Trumaine Banks – senior; 5 R.J. Buckner – freshman; 17 T.J. Wentzel – freshman; 21 Daron Love – freshman; 26 Duran Cooley – junior; 27 Scott Jilek – freshman; 39 Josh Robertson – sophomore	Punters: 14 Blake Haudan – (redshirt) freshman; 41 Justin Kucek – sophomore; Kickers: 31 Jason Giannini – sophomore; 36 Joel Monroe – sophomore; 37 Eric Ellestad – freshman; Long snappers: 43 Robert McGarry – junior; 47 Ryan Coleman – freshman
