= 2006 Alamo Bowl =

- 2006 Alamo Bowl logo
Texas Longhorns	Iowa Hawkeyes
(9–3)	(6–6)
Big 12	Big Ten
26	24
Head coach: Mack Brown	Head coach: Kirk Ferentz
AP / Coaches / BCS; 18 / 16 / 19
	1	2	3	4	Total
Texas	3	7	10	6	26
Iowa	14	0	7	3	24
- Date: December 30, 2006
- Season: 2006
- Stadium: Alamodome
- Location: San Antonio, Texas
- MVP: Offensive: Colt McCoy, Texas; Defensive: Aaron Ross, Texas
- Referee: Jay Stricherz (Pac-10)
- Attendance: 65,875

United States TV coverage
- Network: ESPN
- Announcers: Sean McDonough, Chris Spielman and Rob Stone

The 2006 Alamo Bowl was a college football bowl game, one of the 2006–07 NCAA football bowl games that concluded the 2006 NCAA Division I FBS football season. The game was played in the 65,000-seat Alamodome in San Antonio, Texas on December 30. The game matched the Texas Longhorns versus the Iowa Hawkeyes and was televised on ESPN and ESPN-HD. It was the most watched bowl game in ESPN history.

Alamo Bowl officials announced that both schools sold their entire allotment of tickets, resulting in the fastest sellout in Alamo Bowl history. The attendance for the game was 65,875, which established a new record for the most people to gather in San Antonio to view a sporting event. Texas won the game 26–24.

== Pre-game build-up ==
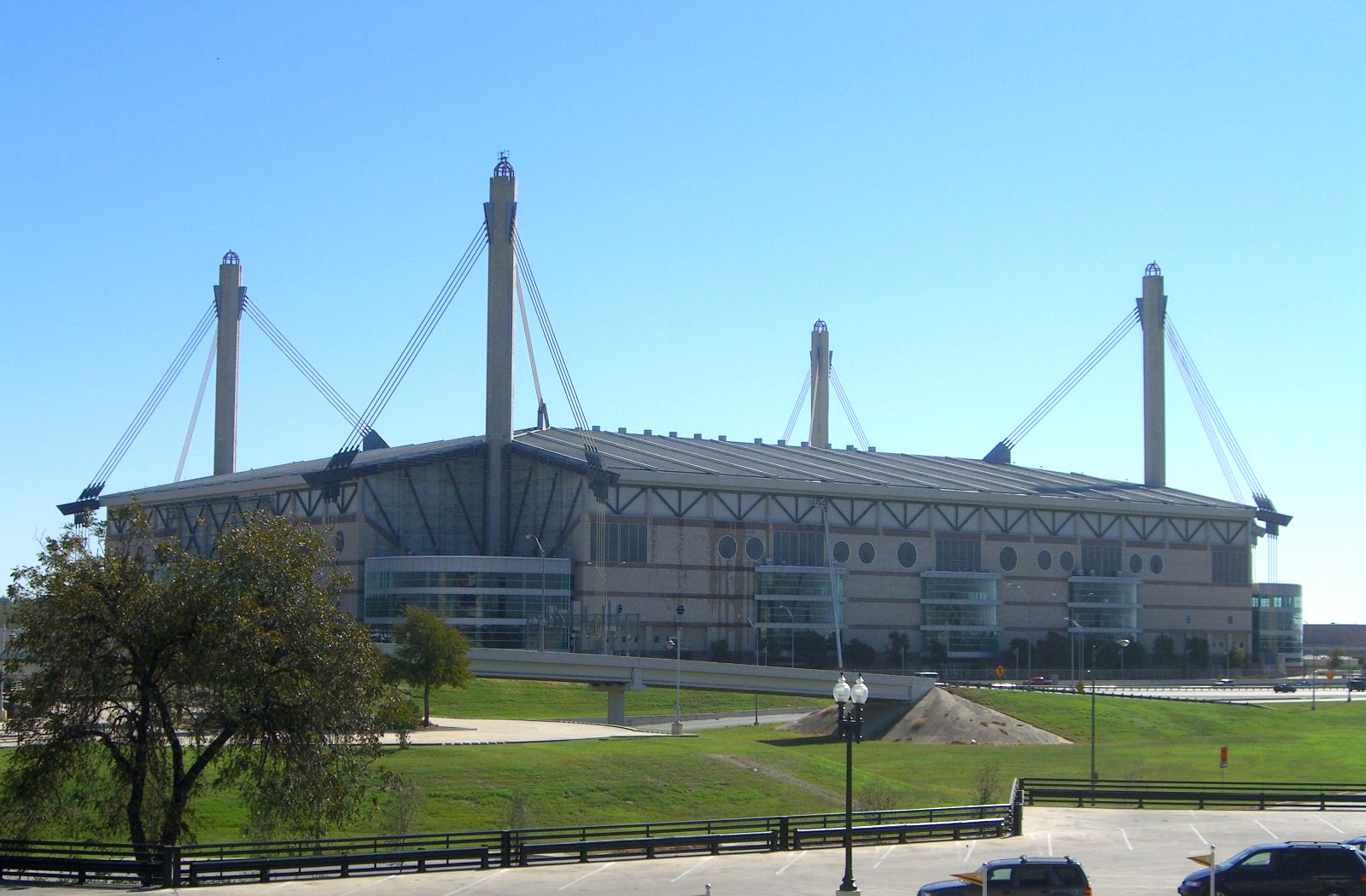
The Alamodome

Texas began the 2006 season as the defending national champions but lost early in the season to No. 1 ranked Ohio State University and finished the year with back-to-back losses to Kansas State University and Texas A&M University to end all hopes of repeating as national champions.

With their loss to Texas A&M, Texas looked north to the Oklahoma vs. Oklahoma State Bedlam Series rivalry. If the Oklahoma State Cowboys had defeated the Oklahoma Sooners, then Texas would still have played in the Big 12 Championship Game with a chance to play in the Fiesta Bowl. That is because both the Longhorns and the Sooners would have had a 6–2 conference record, but the Longhorns would have won the tie-breaker by virtue of winning the head-to-head game against Oklahoma. Oklahoma won the game, however, so the next game for Texas would be their bowl bid, with speculation originally centering on the Cotton Bowl Classic or Gator Bowl on New Year's Day. The Holiday Bowl and the Alamo Bowl were also mentioned as possibilities.

The Longhorns' starting quarterback, Colt McCoy, was injured on the first drive of the Kansas State game. He played against Texas A&M the following game, and final week of the regular season, and was injured after a controversial hit by Aggie defensive tackle Kellen Heard. Longhorns trainer Kenny Boyd said the injury was a severe pinched nerve in McCoy's neck. Boyd said that McCoy was expected to make a full recovery, but no timetable was initially set for McCoy to return to play and no announcement was initially made about his status for the bowl game.

Meanwhile, Longhorn defensive coordinator Gene Chizik accepted the head coaching job at Iowa State University and therefore could not be with the Longhorns for their bowl game. Also, on November 29 the Austin American-Statesman cited unnamed sources saying back-up quarterback Jevan Snead would transfer from Texas and that his availability for the upcoming bowl game was also uncertain. On December 1, the Longhorns issued a statement confirming that Snead, along with sophomore defensive end Chris Brown and sophomore offensive tackle Greg Dolan, had left the team and would transfer to unspecified schools.

On December 3, Texas officially accepted a bid to play in the Alamo Bowl against the University of Iowa Hawkeyes, who finished the regular season at 6–6 overall and in eighth place in the Big 10. This was the first appearance for Texas in the Alamo Bowl, which is played only 75 miles from the University of Texas campus. On December 21, UT announced that McCoy was cleared to play in the bowl game. He did start at quarterback and played the entire game for Texas.

Texas and Iowa had only faced one another once before, in the inaugural playing of the Freedom Bowl in 1984. In the 1984 season, Texas had climbed as high as No. 1 in the rankings before losing the last two games of the season and falling to No. 19. In the Freedom Bowl, an unranked Iowa squad jumped out to a 14–0 first-quarter lead and ended up winning 55–17. Iowa quarterback Chuck Long said, "That game didn't put us on the map, but it was the one that kept us on the map". The next year Iowa made it to the Rose Bowl, and Long finished second to Bo Jackson in the voting for the Heisman Trophy.

For the Iowa Hawkeyes, the 2006 Alamo Bowl was the 22nd bowl game for the school (3rd most in the Big 10) and continued a streak of six bowl game appearances. It was the fourth time for Iowa to play in the Alamo Bowl, with their most recent appearance being a 19–16 victory over Texas Tech in 2001. The game was the second time in three years for Iowa to face the defending national champion in a bowl game; the Hawkeyes beat Louisiana State University 30–25 in the 2004 Capital One Bowl in Orlando, Florida.

Iowa had a 6–6 record for the 2006 season, after going 5–1 in the first half of the season but only 1–5 in the second half. They were ranked as high as fifteenth before the slide. The Hawkeyes were led on the field by quarterback Drew Tate, who ranks second behind Chuck Long in most major school passing categories. In his senior season at Iowa (prior to the bowl), Tate had completed 58 percent of his passes for 2,349 yards and 16 touchdowns with 12 interceptions. This was a slightly disappointing performance since he had completed more than 60 percent of his passes his previous two years, throwing for more than 20 touchdowns each year. Tate attended high school in Texas.

In the Hawkeyes' final regular-season game November 18, 2006, Drew Tate completed 26 of 36 passes for 354 yards and two touchdowns, but he also lost a fumble and threw three interceptions in a 34–24 loss to the Minnesota Golden Gophers. Iowa did not have a super-star receiver to catch Tate's passes. No player on the team had more than 46 receptions or 614 receiving yards.

Iowa coach Ferentz said the month off should give his team an opportunity to get healthy. The time off allowed for the return of starting cornerback Adam Shada and defensive end Kenny Iwebema after both missed most of the second half of the season.

The Alamo Bowl announced that both schools sold their entire allotment of tickets, resulting in the fastest sellout in Alamo Bowl history. The actual attendance for the game was 65,875, which established a new record for the most people to gather in San Antonio to view a sporting event. As of December 11, the betting line was Texas by 11 points.

== Game summary ==
Texas won the coin toss and elected to defer their possession to the second half. UT therefore kicked off to Iowa, who went on offense. The Hawkeyes drove 77 yards for a touchdown. Texas was unable to score, and returned the ball to Iowa. Iowa's Drew Tate threw a pass to Andy Brodell, and he ran 63 yards for a touchdown. Texas was able to get some points on the board when walk-on placekicker Ryan Bailey made a 27-yard field goal to make the score 14–3 at the end of the first quarter.

In the second quarter, Tate threw an apparent touchdown pass to tight end Scott Chandler. Tate was seen celebrating by making an upside-down Hook 'em Horns hand signal. However, the officials ruled that Chandler was an ineligible receiver. On the next play, Tate again tried to find Chandler in the end zone but instead threw an interception to UT defensive back Aaron Ross. Texas got the ball at their own 20. Colt McCoy capped an 80-yard scoring drive with a 20-yard touchdown pass to Limas Sweed. This made the score 14–10 in favor of Iowa as the teams went into half-time.

The Longhorns began the second half by scoring on another Ryan Bailey field goal, this one for 43 yards to bring the score to 14–13. Later in the third quarter, McCoy threw a rarely used wheel route to running back Jamaal Charles, who ran 72 yards for a touchdown to give the Longhorns their first lead of the game at 20–14. This touchdown pass was McCoy's 29th touchdown pass of the season, tying the national record for touchdown passes by a freshman. Iowa answered with another touchdown pass from Drew to Brodell that made the score 21–20 at the end of the third quarter.

In the fourth quarter, McCoy scrambled on fourth down with 11 minutes to go in the game to set up what would prove to be the winning touchdown. McCoy bootlegged to the right with fullback Chris Ogbonnaya as a blocker, running 8 yards to the Iowa 2-yard line. Running back Selvin Young then regained the lead for Texas with a two-yard touchdown run. Texas failed at an attempted two-point conversion, leaving the score at 26–21. Iowa drove into Texas territory but settled for a Kyle Schlicher field goal to make the score 26–24 with 6:20 left on the game clock.

With 3:35 left to play, Iowa attempted a trick play – an attempted flanker pass that has posed problems for Texas all season. Safety Marcus Griffin stuffed the play for an 11-yard loss. Commenting on stopping the trick play, Griffin said, "I knew it was coming – we'd been beaten by that play in the last 10 games. We knew it had to come, I guess that was the best time for it." Iowa coach Kirk Ferentz described the call as "totally my fault. I was being greedy, I thought we had a secure play."

Tate then threw two incomplete passes and the Hawkeyes punted with a little more than two minutes to play. Texas, assisted by an 11-yard end-around run by flanker Billy Pitman, used all but 10 seconds of the game clock before punting to Iowa. One play later, the game was over. The final score was Texas 26, Iowa 24.

== Game statistics ==
Statistic	Texas	Iowa
First Downs	17	17
Total Yards	378	363
Passing yards	308	274
Rushing yards	70	89
Return yards	−1	−4
Penalties	6–60	8–53
Passing (Att-Comp-Int)	40–26–0	25–15–1
Punts – Average	6–37.8	5–42.4
Third Down Conversions	6–15	6–13
Fourth Down Conversions	1–1	0–0
Fumbles – Lost	2–1	2–1
Time of Possession	29:04	30:56

== After the game ==
ESPN announced that the 2006 Alamo Bowl was the most watched bowl game in the history of that television network.

Official Jeff Robinson released a statement to clarify the call which nullified the pass to Chandler: "The man who caught the ball (#87) came in motion and came across the line, which made him ineligible to go down field to catch the ball. There was already a man outside of him. The official term for the call on the field is 'covered up on the line.'"

The Texas Longhorns were ranked 19th in the Bowl Championship Series (BCS) rankings, which were issued before the bowl season. They received a final-ranking of 13th in the nation by both the Associated Press AP Poll and the USA Today Coaches Poll. The Iowa Hawkeyes finished the season unranked.
