= Mike Klinkenborg =

American football player (born 1985)

No. 40
- Position: Linebacker

Personal information
- Born: January 19, 1985 (age 41)
- Listed height: 6 ft 2 in (1.88 m)
- Listed weight: 240 lb (109 kg)

Career information
- High school: Central Lyon (Rock Rapids, Iowa)
- College: Iowa Hawkeyes (2005–2007)

Mike Klinkenborg, born January 19, 1985, was a starting middle linebacker for the University of Iowa Hawkeyes football team. Born and raised in a farm near Rock Rapids, Iowa, Klinkenborg is an elementary education major at Iowa and has 145 career tackles. His 129 tackles in 2006 were second-best in the Big Ten.

Klinkenborg is widely known for his performance in Iowa's 2006 game against Iowa State. Just six days before the annual rivalry game, Klinkenborg's father Myron died of a heart attack. Instead of sitting out the game, Klinkenborg played and recorded eight tackles. A day later, he was named Walter Camp Defensive Player of the Week.

== Collegiate career ==
After redshirting in 2003, Klinkenborg played in six games in 2004. He recorded 4 solo tackles and one assisted tackle in games against Iowa State and Michigan State. The next year, Klinkenborg remained behind linebackers Chad Greenway and Abdul Hodge on the depth chart. Playing in limited time once again, Klinkenborg recorded 7 solo tackles and 4 assisted tackles in the season.

=== 2006 ===
In 2006, Klinkenborg established his starting spot early, as he was listed as the starting middle linebacker following spring practice. Playing in every regular season game, he recorded 129 tackles, which was the 17th-best single season total in Iowa history. In Iowa's loss to Northwestern, Klinkenborg recorded 16 tackles and recorded the only sack in his career to date. However, he did not play in Iowa's bowl game against Texas due to injury.

=== 2007 ===
Before the season, Klinkenborg was named to the pre-season Lott Trophy watch list and the Bednarik Award watch list.

=== Statistics ===
| Iowa | | Defense |
| Season | Games | Tackles | T/Loss | Sacks | Fumble Recoveries | Pass Breakups |
|---|---|---|---|---|---|---|
| 2004 | 6 | 5 | 0 | 0 | 0 | 0 |
| 2005 | 11 | 11 | 0 | 0 | 0 | 0 |
| 2006 | 12 | 129 | 6 | 1 | 2 | 2 |
| Total | 29 | 145 | 6 | 1 | 2 | 2 |
