= Robert Killebrew =

American gridiron football player (born 1984)

Profile
- Position: Linebacker

Personal information
- Born: December 16, 1984 (age 41); Spring, Texas, U.S.
- Listed height: 6 ft 3 in (1.91 m)
- Listed weight: 235 lb (107 kg)

Career information
- College: Texas
- NFL draft: 2008: undrafted

Career history
- Calgary Stampeders (2009)*
- * Offseason or practice squad member only

Awards and highlights
- BCS national champion (2005)

Robert Winston Killebrew (born December 16, 1984) is an American former football linebacker. He played college football for the Texas Longhorns. He was signed by the Calgary Stampeders as a street free agent in 2009.
