= 2006 Wisconsin Badgers football team =

American college football season

2006 Wisconsin Badgers football

Capital One Bowl champion

Capital One Bowl, W 17–14 vs. Arkansas
- Conference: Big Ten Conference

Ranking
- Coaches: No. 5
- AP: No. 7
- Record: 12–1 (7–1 Big Ten)
- Head coach: Bret Bielema (1st season)
- Offensive coordinator: Paul Chryst (2nd season)
- Offensive scheme: Pro-style
- Defensive coordinator: Mike Hankwitz (1st season)
- Base defense: 4–3
- MVPs: John Stocco; Joe Thomas; Joe Monty; Mark Zalewski Joe Stellmacher Roderick Rogers
- Captains: John Stocco; Joe Thomas; Mark Zalewski; 4th captain named each game
- Home stadium: Camp Randall Stadium

2006 Big Ten Conference football standings
	Conf.			Overall
Team	W		L	W		L
No. 2 Ohio State $	8	–	0	12	–	1
No. 8 Michigan %	7	–	1	11	–	2
No. 7 Wisconsin	7	–	1	12	–	1
No. 24 Penn State	5	–	3	9	–	4
Purdue	5	–	3	8	–	6
Minnesota	3	–	5	6	–	7
Indiana	3	–	5	5	–	7
Northwestern	2	–	6	4	–	8
Iowa	2	–	6	6	–	7
Illinois	1	–	7	2	–	10
Michigan State	1	–	7	4	–	8
$ – BCS representative as conference champion; % – BCS at-large representative; Rankings from AP Poll

The 2006 Wisconsin Badgers football team was an American football team that represented the University of Wisconsin–Madison as a member of the Big Ten Conference during the 2006 NCAA Division I FBS football season. In their first year under head coach Bret Bielema, the Badgers compiled a 12–1 record (7–1 in conference games), tied for second place in the Big Ten, and outscored opponents by a total of 380 to 157. During the regular season, the Badgers played only one game against a ranked opponent, losing to No. 6 Michigan. They concluded the season with a 17–14 victory over Arkansas in the Capital One Bowl.

The Badgers' 11 regular-season wins and 12 overall wins were both single-season records for the Wisconsin football program. Unranked in the preseason and expected to finish in the middle of the Big Ten, the team ended the season ranked No. 7 in the final AP poll and No. 5 in the final coaches poll.

Offensive lineman Joe Thomas was a consensus first-team pick on the 2006 All-America team. The team's statistical leaders included quarterback John Stocco (2,185 passing yards), tailback P. J. Hill (1,569 rushing yards, 96 points scored), wide receiver Travis Beckum (61 receptions for 903 yards), and middle linebacker Mark Zalewski (55 solo tackles, 90 total tackles).

== Schedule ==
Date	Time	Opponent	Rank	Site	TV	Result	Attendance	Source
September 2	6:00 p.m.	vs. Bowling Green*		Cleveland Browns Stadium; Cleveland, OH	ESPN Plus	W 35–14	30,307	
September 9	2:30 p.m.	Western Illinois*		Camp Randall Stadium; Madison, WI	ESPNU	W 34–10	80,845	
September 16	2:30 p.m.	San Diego State*		Camp Randall Stadium; Madison, WI	ESPN Plus	W 14–0	81,090	
September 23	11:00 a.m.	at No. 6 Michigan		Michigan Stadium; Ann Arbor, MI	ESPN	L 13–27	111,058	
September 30	11:00 a.m.	at Indiana		Memorial Stadium; Bloomington, IN	ESPN2	W 52–17	32,142	
October 7	11:00 a.m.	Northwestern		Camp Randall Stadium; Madison, WI	ESPN360	W 41–9	81,704	
October 14	11:00 a.m.	Minnesota^{†}	No. 25	Camp Randall Stadium; Madison, WI (rivalry)	ESPN	W 48–12	82,010	
October 21	11:00 a.m.	at Purdue	No. 21	Ross–Ade Stadium; West Lafayette, IN	ESPN	W 24–3	58,111	
October 28	11:00 a.m.	Illinois	No. 17	Camp Randall Stadium; Madison, WI	ESPN2	W 30–24	81,300	
November 4	11:00 a.m.	Penn State	No. 17	Camp Randall Stadium; Madison, WI	ABC	W 13–3	81,777	
November 11	11:00 a.m.	at Iowa	No. 16	Kinnick Stadium; Iowa City, IA (rivalry)	ESPN	W 24–21	70,585	
November 18	11:00 a.m.	Buffalo*	No. 12	Camp Randall Stadium; Madison, WI	ESPNU	W 35–3	80,850	
January 1, 2007	12:00 p.m.	vs. No. 12 Arkansas*	No. 6	Florida Citrus Bowl; Orlando, FL (Capital One Bowl)	ABC	W 17–14	60,774	
*Non-conference game; ^{†}Homecoming; Rankings from AP Poll released prior to the game; All times are in Central time

== Preseason ==
The Badgers were picked to finish in the middle of the Big Ten conference and were not ranked in the preseason for a number of reasons. Early defections to the National Football League by second-team All-Americans Brandon Williams and Brian Calhoun left the Badger offense with only three returning starters. Additionally, with the departure of Barry Alvarez – who had just completed his final season with 10 wins and a Capital One Bowl victory – the head coaching job was taken over by Bret Bielema, then the youngest head coach in Division I-A football.

Bright spots for the Badgers included returning All-American offensive tackle Joe Thomas, who was coming off an Anterior cruciate ligament (ACL) injury. John Stocco resumed the starting position at quarterback for his senior season, and P. J. Hill won the starting tailback job. The defense was to be led by senior linebacker Mark Zalewski and senior strong safety Joe Stellmacher. The special teams unit was considered strong, with All-American candidate Ken DeBauche punting the ball.

Some sportswriters felt that the non-conference schedule, featuring Bowling Green, Western Illinois (an FCS team), San Diego State, and Buffalo, was weak. Early in the season, the team's non-conference schedule was placed on the "waiting list" of ESPN.com's Bottom 10 rankings.

== Game summaries ==
=== Bowling Green ===
Wisconsin vs Bowling Green – Game summary

Quarter	1	2	3	4	Total
Badgers	7	14	7	7	35
Falcons	7	0	7	0	14

at Cleveland Browns Stadium

- Date: September 2, 2006
- Game time: 6:00 p.m.
- Game weather: 60 °F (16 °C); Mostly cloudy; Wind at E 14 MPH
- Game attendance: 30,307
- Referee: Steve Newman
- TV: ESPN+

Game information

First quarter

- BGU – Freddie Barnes 21-yard TD run (Sean Ellis kick), 10:40. Bowling Green 7–0. Drive: 10 plays, 80 yards, 4:20.
- WIS – Dywon Rowan 7-yard TD run (Taylor Mehlhaff kick), 6:34. Tie 7–7. Drive: 10 plays, 66 yards, 3:55.

Second quarter

- WIS – Jonathan Casillas 0-yard block punt return (Taylor Mehlhaff kick), 12:58. Wisconsin 14–7.
- WIS – John Stocco 1-yard TD run (Taylor Mehlhaff kick), 0:17. Wisconsin 21–7. Drive: 5 plays, 17 yards, 2:15.

Third quarter

- BGU – Freddie Barnes 2-yard TD run (Sean Ellis kick), 6:58. Wisconsin 21–14. Drive: 16 plays, 79 yards, 6:41.
- WIS – Bill Rentmeester 4-yard pass from John Stocco (Taylor Mehlhaff kick), 2:36. Wisconsin 28–14. Drive: 9 plays, 75 yards, 4:14.

Fourth quarter

- WIS – P. J. Hill 10-yard TD run (Taylor Mehlhaff kick), 5:19. Wisconsin 35–14. Drive: 9 plays, 80 yards, 4:38.

Top passers

- BGU – Freddie Barnes – 12/19, 82 yards
- WIS – John Stocco – 9/15, 124 yards, TD, INT

Top rushers

- BGU – Freddie Barnes – 29 rushes, 158 yards, 2 TD
- WIS – P. J. Hill – 22 rushes, 130 yards, TD

Top receivers

- BGU – Ken Brantley – 2 receptions, 27 yards
- WIS – Travis Beckum – 3 receptions, 49 yards

Top defenders

- BGU – Kenny Lewis – 10 tackles, INT
- WIS – Jonathan Casillas – 12 tackles, 2.5 TFL, blocked punt, TD

In his debut, P. J. Hill, Jr. had 130 rushing yards and a touchdown to lead the Badgers to a victory over the hometeam Falcons. The Badgers broke a 7–7 tie in the second quarter when a Alonso Rojas punt was blocked by Jonathan Casillas and he recovered the punt in the end zone for a touchdown. John Stocco finished 9-of-15 for 124 yards and a touchdown, with an interception.

=== Western Illinois ===
Western Illinois vs Wisconsin – Game summary

Quarter	1	2	3	4	Total
Leathernecks	3	0	0	7	10
Badgers	3	17	0	14	34

at Camp Randall Stadium

- Date: September 9, 2006
- Game time: 2:30 p.m.
- Game weather: 60 °F (16 °C); Cloudy; Wind at NE 10-20 MPH
- Game attendance: 80,845
- Referee: John O'Neill
- TV: ESPNU

Game information

First quarter

- WIU – Taylor Rowan 42-yard field goal, 12:43 Western Illinois 3–0. Drive: 5 plays, 12 yards, 2:03.
- WIS – Taylor Mehlhaff 28-yard field goal, 6:15. Tie 3–3. Drive: 12 plays, 69 yards, 6:20.

Second quarter

- WIS – P. J. Hill 1-yard TD run (Taylor Mehlhaff kick), 12:19. Wisconsin 10–3. Drive: 14 plays, 83 yards, 7:02.
- WIS – P. J. Hill 1-yard TD run (Taylor Mehlhaff kick), 2:04. Wisconsin 17–3. Drive: 14 plays, 81 yards, 7:20.
- WIS – Taylor Mehlhaff 46-yard field goal, 0:04. Wisconsin 20–3. Drive: 5 plays, 24 yards, 0:30.

Third quarter

No scoring

Fourth quarter

- WIS – P. J. Hill 2-yard TD run (Taylor Mehlhaff kick), 13:10. Wisconsin 27–3. Drive: 4 plays, 40 yards, 1:40.
- WIS – Andy Crooks 24-yard pass from John Stocco (Taylor Mehlhaff kick), 10:04. Wisconsin 34–3. Drive: 2 plays, 43 yards, 1:01.
- WIU – Kevin Almlie 17-yard interception return (Taylor Rowan kick), 5:51. Wisconsin 34–10.

Top passers

- WIU – Steve LaFalce – 20/41, 168 yards, 3 INT
- WIS – John Stocco – 15/25, 227 yards, TD

Top rushers

- WIU – Herb Donaldson – 17 rushes, 70 yards
- WIS – P. J. Hill – 22 rushes, 101 yards, 3 TD

Top receivers

- WIU – Marco Thomas – 8 receptions, 54 yards
- WIS – Paul Hubbard – 4 receptions, 87 yards

Top defenders

- WIU – Jason Williams – 8 tackles, 2.0 TFL, sack, QB hurry
- WIS – Joe Stellmacher – 7 tackles, INT

P. J. Hill, Jr. ran for over 100 yards for the second game in a row and the Badgers overcame a rocky first quarter to beat the Leathernecks. After a fumble on the kickoff led to a WIU field goal, the Badgers reeled off 34 straight points – 17 in the second quarter – to effectively put the game away. John Stocco was 15–25 for 227 yards and another touchdown and Hill collected three touchdowns on the ground for the Badgers.

=== San Diego State ===
San Diego State vs Wisconsin – Game summary

Quarter	1	2	3	4	Total
Aztecs	0	0	0	0	0
Badgers	0	0	7	7	14

at Camp Randall Stadium

- Date: September 16, 2006
- Game time: 2:30 p.m.
- Game weather: 60 °F (16 °C); Cloudy; Wind at NE 10-20 MPH
- Game attendance: 81,090
- Referee: Ron Torbert
- TV: ESPN+

Game information

First quarter

No scoring

Second quarter

No scoring

Third quarter

- WIS – P. J. Hill 53-yard TD run (Taylor Mehlhaff kick), 6:49. Wisconsin 7–0. Drive: 1 plays, 53 yards, 0:22.

Fourth quarter

- WIS – Paul Hubbard 6-yard pass from John Stocco (Taylor Mehlhaff kick), 7:06. Wisconsin 14–0. Drive: 7 plays, 72 yards, 3:59.

Top passers

- SDS – Darren Mougey – 15/27, 102 yards
- WIS – John Stocco – 12/23, 85 yards, TD

Top rushers

- SDS – Lynell Hamilton – 11 rushes, 19 yards
- WIS – P. J. Hill – 26 rushes, 184 yards, TD

Top receivers

- SDS – Brett Swain – 5 receptions, 33 yards
- WIS – Paul Hubbard – 3 receptions, 18 yards, TD

Top defenders

- SDS – Joe Martin – 8 tackles, 1.0 TFL, forced fumble, pass breakup
- WIS – Mark Zalewski – 8 tackles, 2.0 TFL, 2 sacks

P. J. Hill, Jr. ran for 184 yards and a touchdown and the defense shut out the Aztecs in the last game before the start of conference play. The Badgers allowed just 153 yards but the offense was out of sync for the third straight week as Stocco completed just 12 of his 23 passes for 85 yards. Paul Hubbard registered a six-yard touchdown catch in the fourth quarter to close out the scoring.

=== Michigan ===
Wisconsin vs Michigan – Game summary

Quarter	1	2	3	4	Total
Badgers	7	3	0	3	13
No. 6 Wolverines	0	10	7	10	27

at Michigan Stadium

- Date: September 23, 2006
- Game time: 11:00 a.m.
- Game weather: 71 °F (22 °C); Cloudy; Wind at SW 5-10 MPH
- Game attendance: 111,058
- Referee: Dan Capron
- TV: ESPN

Game information

First quarter

- WIS – P. J. Hill 29-yard pass from John Stocco (Taylor Mehlhaff kick), 9:08. Wisconsin 7–0. Drive: 5 plays, 60 yards, 2:44.

Second quarter

- MIC – Mario Manningham 24-yard pass from Chad Henne (Garrett Rivas kick), 13:19. Tie 7–7. Drive: 3 plays, 36 yards, 1:22.
- WIS – Taylor Mehlhaff 39-yard field goal, 5:37. Wisconsin 10–7. Drive: 10 plays, 66 yards, 3:56.
- MIC – Garrett Rivas 31-yard field goal, 2:45. Tie 10–10. Drive: 4 plays, 4 yards, 0:57.

Third quarter

- MIC – Mario Manningham 38-yard pass from Chad Henne (Garrett Rivas kick), 3:11. Michigan 17–10. Drive: 4 plays, 56 yards, 1:55.

Fourth quarter

- MIC – Mike Hart 5-yard TD run (Garrett Rivas kick), 11:33. Michigan 24–10. Drive: 4 plays, 33 yards, 1:39.
- MIC – Garrett Rivas 32-yard field goal, 5:29. Michigan 27–10. Drive: 9 plays, 26 yards, 4:15.'
- WIS – Taylor Mehlhaff 26-yard field goal, 2:19. Michigan 27–13. Drive: 12 plays, 77 yards, 3:10.

Top passers

- MIC – Chad Henne – 18/25, 211 yards, 2 TD, 3 INT
- WIS – John Stocco – 22/42, 236 yards, TD

Top rushers

- MIC – Mike Hart – 23 rushes, 91 yards, TD
- WIS – P. J. Hill – 20 rushes, 54 yards

Top receivers

- MIC – Mario Manningham – 7 receptions, 113 yards, 2 TD
- WIS – P. J. Hill – 5 receptions, 64 yards, TD

Top defenders

- MIC – David Harris – 10 tackles, 2.0 TFL
- WIS – Jonathan Casillas – 8 tackles, 1.0 TFL, sack

Wisconsin performed admirably in the first half, scoring 10 points but special teams miscues led to 10 Wolverine points by the break. P. J. Hill, Jr. was held to 54 yards against the stout Michigan run defense and Mario Manningham had 113 yards and two touchdowns through the air as Michigan raced out to 17 straight points in the second half to beat the Badgers, 27–13. The Badgers intercepted Chad Henne three times, but it was not enough to overcome the Wolverines' powerful offense. Wisconsin, which had beaten Michigan in 2005, had a five-game winning streak snapped. Michigan moved to 4–0 on the season.

=== Indiana ===
Wisconsin vs Indiana – Game summary

Quarter	1	2	3	4	Total
Badgers	14	21	17	0	52
Hoosiers	0	0	0	17	17

at Memorial Stadium

- Date: September 30, 2006
- Game time: 11:00 a.m.
- Game weather: 61 °F (16 °C); Sunny; Wind at SW 14 MPH
- Game attendance: 32,142
- Referee: Dan Capron
- TV: ESPN2

Game information

First quarter

- WIS – P. J. Hill 1-yard TD run (Taylor Mehlhaff kick), 4:21. Wisconsin 7–0. Drive: 10 plays, 89 yards, 4:42.
- WIS – Travis Beckum 35-yard pass from John Stocco (Taylor Mehlhaff kick), 1:39. Wisconsin 14–0. Drive: 4 plays, 73 yards, 1:29.

Second quarter

- WIS – Paul Hubbard 15-yard pass from John Stocco (Taylor Mehlhaff kick), 10:22. Wisconsin 21–0. Drive: 11 plays, 63 yards, 1:29.
- WIS – Andy Crooks 3-yard pass from John Stocco (Taylor Mehlhaff kick), 8:04. Wisconsin 28–0. Drive: 4 plays, 23 yards, 1:44.
- WIS – P. J. Hill 1-yard TD run (Taylor Mehlhaff kick), 1:52. Wisconsin 35–0. Drive: 6 plays, 79 yards, 2:28.

Third quarter

- WIS – P. J. Hill 1-yard TD run (Taylor Mehlhaff kick), 9:28. Wisconsin 42–0. Drive: 6 plays, 77 yards, 1:53.
- WIS – Taylor Mehlhaff 28-yard field goal, 2:27. Wisconsin 45–0. Drive: 12 plays, 42 yards, 5:07.
- WIS – Lance Smith 4-yard TD run (Taylor Mehlhaff kick), 0:55. Wisconsin 52–0. Drive: 1 plays, 4 yards, 0:26.

Fourth quarter

- IND – Austin Starr 21-yard field goal, 9:54. Wisconsin 52–3. Drive: 12 plays, 77 yards, 6:14.'
- IND – Troy Grosfield 15-yard fumble return (Austin Starr kick), 9:41. Wisconsin 52–10.
- IND – Josiah Sears 8-yard TD run (J. Gilmore kick), 3:25. Wisconsin 52–17. Drive: 7 plays, 94 yards, 2:49.

Top passers

- IND – Kellen Lewis – 13/29, 113 yards
- WIS – John Stocco – 15/17, 304 yards, 3 TD

Top rushers

- IND – Josiah Sears – 9 rushes, 100 yards, TD
- WIS – P. J. Hill – 23 rushes, 129 yards, 3 TD

Top receivers

- IND – Nick Polk – 4 receptions, 45 yards
- WIS – Paul Hubbard – 6 receptions, 122 yards, TD

Top defenders

- IND – Troy Grosfield – 15 tackles, 0.5 TFL, fumble recovery, TD
- WIS – Elijah Hodge – 6 tackles, 1.0 TFL, sack

The Badgers bounced back from their first loss of the season, racing out to a 52–0 lead over the hometeam Hoosiers en route to a dominating 52–17 victory. John Stocco threw for 304 yards and had three touchdown strikes by halftime, and P. J. Hill, Jr. had 129 yards and another three touchdowns for the Badgers. The Hoosiers were held to just 147 yards through three quarters. Paul Hubbard caught seven passes for 122 yards and a touchdown for the Badgers.

=== Northwestern ===
Northwestern vs Wisconsin – Game summary

Quarter	1	2	3	4	Total
Wildcats	6	3	0	0	9
Badgers	10	7	17	7	41

at Camp Randall Stadium

- Date: October 7, 2006
- Game time: 11:00 a.m.
- Game weather: 54 °F (12 °C); Sunny; Wind at S 10 MPH
- Game attendance: 81,704
- Referee: Bill LeMonnier
- TV: ESPN360

Game information

First quarter

- WIS – P. J. Hill 60-yard TD run (Taylor Mehlhaff kick), 12:54. Wisconsin 7–0. Drive: 2 plays, 61 yards, 1:06.
- WIS – Taylor Mehlhaff 40-yard field goal, 7:51. Wisconsin 10–0. Drive: 9 plays, 41 yards, 3:38.
- NU – Andrew Brewer 1-yard TD run (Joel Howells kick blocked), 6:28. Wisconsin 10–7. Drive: 5 plays, 52 yards, 1:10.

Second quarter

- NU – Joel Howells 22-yard field goal, 13:10. Wisconsin 10–9. Drive: 12 plays, 56 yards, 4:47.'
- WIS – Luke Swan 14-yard pass from John Stocco (Taylor Mehlhaff kick), 6:55. Wisconsin 17–9. Drive: 6 plays, 62 yards, 3:13.

Third quarter

- WIS – Taylor Mehlhaff 42-yard field goal, 7:23. Wisconsin 20–9. Drive: 10 plays, 55 yards, 5:21.
- WIS – Dywon Rowan 4-yard TD run (Taylor Mehlhaff kick), 1:22. Wisconsin 27–9. Drive: 10 plays, 73 yards, 4:17.
- WIS – Joe Stellmacher 25-yard interception return (Taylor Mehlhaff kick), 0:14. Wisconsin 34–9.

Fourth quarter

- WIS – Lance Smith 25-yard TD run (Taylor Mehlhaff kick), 0:54. Wisconsin 41–9. Drive: 4 plays, 46 yards, 2:48.

Top passers

- NU – Andrew Brewer – 10/24, 94 yards, INT
- WIS – John Stocco – 16/21, 220 yards, TD, INT

Top rushers

- NU – Andrew Brewer – 13 rushes, 80 yards, TD
- WIS – P. J. Hill – 35 rushes, 249 yards, TD

Top receivers

- NU – Eric Peterman – 3 receptions, 26 yards
- WIS – Travis Beckum – 8 receptions, 107 yards

Top defenders

- NU – Marquice Cole – 9 tackles, fumble recovery, INT
- WIS – Joe Stellmacher – 6 tackles, INT, TD

For the second straight week, the Badger defense stepped up big, holding NU tailback Tyrell Sutton to just 18 yards on the ground. Wisconsin avenged last year's loss to the Wildcats with a punishing ground game, highlighted by P. J. Hill, Jr.'s rumbling 60-yard touchdown in the first quarter. In his best effort to date, Hill piled up 249 of the Badgers' 316 yards on the ground as the Badgers prevailed.

=== Minnesota ===
Minnesota vs Wisconsin – Game summary

Quarter	1	2	3	4	Total
Golden Gophers	3	0	2	7	12
No. 25 Badgers	14	14	13	7	48

at Camp Randall Stadium

- Date: October 14, 2006
- Game time: 11:00 a.m.
- Game weather: 39 °F (4 °C); Partly cloudy; Wind at W 10 MPH
- Game attendance: 82,010
- Referee: Dennis Lipski
- TV: ESPN

Game information

First quarter

- WIS – Jack Ikegwuonu 50-yard fumble return (Taylor Mehlhaff kick), 13:25. Wisconsin 7–0.
- WIS – P. J. Hill 5-yard TD run (Taylor Mehlhaff kick), 5:24. Wisconsin 14–0. Drive: 10 plays, 87 yards, 4:59.
- MIN – Jason Giannini 37-yard field goal, 3:14. Wisconsin 14–3. Drive: 8 plays, 60 yards, 2:06.'

Second quarter

- WIS – Luke Swan 8-yard pass from John Stocco (Taylor Mehlhaff kick), 8:37. Wisconsin 21–3. Drive: 7 plays, 53 yards, 3:54.
- WIS – Andy Crooks 2-yard pass from John Stocco (Taylor Mehlhaff kick), 1:59. Wisconsin 28–3. Drive: 8 plays, 38 yards, 5:12.

Third quarter

- WIS – Travis Beckum 40-yard pass from John Stocco (Taylor Mehlhaff kick), 14:01. Wisconsin 35–3. Drive: 2 plays, 81 yards, 0:50.
- WIS – P. J. Hill 2-yard TD run (Ken DeBauche pass intercepted), 10:11. Wisconsin 41–3. Drive: 6 plays, 53 yards, 1:57.
- MIN – Mario Reese 98-yard PAT return (Jason Giannini kick), 10:11. Wisconsin 41–5.

Fourth quarter

- MIN – Amir Pinnix 2-yard TD run (Jason Giannini kick), 14:49. Wisconsin 41–12. Drive: 7 plays, 22 yards, 2:56.
- WIS – Travis Beckum 4-yard pass from John Stocco (Taylor Mehlhaff kick), 8:52. Wisconsin 48–12. Drive: 9 plays, 58 yards, 5:48.

Top passers

- MIN – Bryan Cupito – 13/28, 94 yards, INT
- WIS – John Stocco – 12/19, 193 yards, 4 TD

Top rushers

- MIN – Amir Pinnix – 19 rushes, 97 yards, TD
- WIS – P. J. Hill – 25 rushes, 164 yards, 2 TD

Top receivers

- MIN – Matt Spaeth – 4 receptions, 42 yards
- WIS – Travis Beckum – 5 receptions, 118 yards, 2 TD

Top defenders

- MIN – Trumaine Banks – 9 tackles, 0.5 TFL
- WIS – Jonathan Casillas – 8 tackles, 1.0 TFL

The Badgers hosted Minnesota in the battle for Paul Bunyan's Axe. The Badgers, who had moved into the AP rankings for the first time this season, prevailed 48–12 behind John Stocco's four touchdown passes, two to Travis Beckum, who also had 118 receiving yards. Stocco finished 12-of-19 for 193 yards. Jack Ikegwuonu opened the scoring by returning Amir Pinnix's first-quarter fumble 50 yards for a touchdown. P. J. Hill, Jr. racked up 164 yards and two more scores as the Badgers defended the Axe.

=== Purdue ===
Wisconsin vs Purdue – Game summary

Quarter	1	2	3	4	Total
No. 21 Badgers	0	10	7	7	24
Boilermakers	3	0	0	0	3

at Ross–Ade Stadium

- Date: October 21, 2006
- Game time: 11:00 a.m.
- Game weather: 56 °F (13 °C); Partly cloudy; Wind at SW 11 MPH
- Game attendance: 58,111
- Referee: John O'Neill
- TV: ESPN

Game information

First quarter

- PUR – Chris Summers 47-yard field goal, 5:16. Purdue 3–0. Drive: 8 plays, 50 yards, 2:13.'

Second quarter

- WIS – P. J. Hill 1-yard TD run (Taylor Mehlhaff kick), 8:13. Wisconsin 7–3. Drive: 11 plays, 89 yards, 5:28.
- WIS – Taylor Mehlhaff 51-yard field goal, 1:15. Wisconsin 10–3. Drive: 5 plays, 42 yards, 0:48.

Third quarter

- WIS – P. J. Hill 3-yard TD run (Taylor Mehlhaff kick), 4:38. Wisconsin 17–3. Drive: 12 plays, 80 yards, 6:10.

Fourth quarter

- WIS – Lance Smith 8-yard TD run (Taylor Mehlhaff kick), 5:11. Wisconsin 24–3. Drive: 6 plays, 85 yards, 3:29.

Top passers

- PUR – Curtis Painter – 20/40, 187 yards, INT
- WIS – John Stocco – 13/21, 201 yards, INT

Top rushers

- PUR – Jaycen Taylor – 8 rushes, 46 yards
- WIS – P. J. Hill – 29 rushes, 161 yards, 2 TD

Top receivers

- PUR – Greg Orton – 6 receptions, 83 yards
- WIS – Paul Hubbard – 4 receptions, 80 yards

Top defenders

- PUR – Cliff Avril – 7 tackles, 1.0 TFL, sack
- WIS – Jonathan Casillas – 8 tackles, 1.0 TFL, INT, pass breakup

The Badgers moved into the Coaches Poll for the first time, ranked #22 going into their showdown against Purdue. The Badger defense figured to get a good test against the Boilermakers offense, which led the Big Ten at over 470 yards a game entering the contest. Purdue managed only 299 yards and a field goal as the Badgers limited Purdue quarterback Curtis Painter to just 187 yards on 20-of-40 passing and an interception. P. J. Hill, Jr. ran for another two touchdowns and 161 yards.

=== Illinois ===
Illinois vs Wisconsin – Game summary

Quarter	1	2	3	4	Total
Fighting Illini	7	17	0	0	24
No. 17 Badgers	0	10	10	10	30

at Camp Randall Stadium

- Date: October 28, 2006
- Game time: 11:00 a.m.
- Game weather: 44 °F (7 °C); Sunny; Wind at W 10 MPH
- Game attendance: 81,300
- Referee: Todd Geerlings
- TV: ESPN2

Game information

First quarter

- ILL – Travon Bellamy 41-yard interception return (Jason Reda kick), 3:34. Illinois 7–0.

Second quarter

- WIS – Taylor Mehlhaff 21-yard field goal, 14:57. Illinois 7–3. Drive: 4 plays, 8 yards, 1:52.
- ILL – Pierre Thomas 2-yard pass from Juice Williams (Jason Reda kick), 10:42. Illinois 14–3. Drive: 8 plays, 80 yards, 4:09.
- ILL – Pierre Thomas 1-yard TD run (Jason Reda kick), 5:45. Illinois 21–3. Drive: 8 plays, 24 yards, 4:28.
- WIS – Lance Smith 1-yard TD run (Taylor Mehlhaff kick), 1:44. Illinois 21–10. Drive: 11 plays, 76 yards, 3:56.
- ILL – Jason Reda 20-yard field goal, 0:08. Illinois 24–10. Drive: 11 plays, 69 yards, 1:28.'

Third quarter

- WIS – Luke Swan 17-yard pass from John Stocco (Taylor Mehlhaff kick), 10:36. Illinois 24–17. Drive: 6 plays, 44 yards, 2:26.
- WIS – Taylor Mehlhaff 21-yard field goal, 3:57. Illinois 24–20. Drive: 9 plays, 62 yards, 3:53.

Fourth quarter

- WIS – Andy Crooks 0-yard fumble return (Taylor Mehlhaff kick), 14:50. Wisconsin 27–24.
- WIS – Taylor Mehlhaff 33-yard field goal, 4:27. Wisconsin 30–24. Drive: 11 plays, 30 yards, 5:46.

Top passers

- ILL – Juice Williams – 13/29, 171 yards, TD, INT
- WIS – John Stocco – 15/26, 217 yards, 2 TD, INT

Top rushers

- ILL – Pierre Thomas – 8 rushes, 23 yards, TD
- WIS – Lance Smith – 21 rushes, 46 yards, TD

Top receivers

- ILL – Derrick McPhearson – 1 receptions, 52 yards
- WIS – Luke Swan – 4 receptions, 85 yards, TD

Top defenders

- ILL – Jeremy Leman – 13 tackles, 2.5 TFL
- WIS – Matt Shaughnessy – 8 tackles, 3.0 TFL, 2 sacks, QB hurry

The visiting Illini gave the #18 Badgers a scare, as Illinois quarterback Juice Williams engineered three scoring drives in the second quarter to give the Illini a 24–10 lead at halftime. P. J. Hill, Jr. suffered a pinched nerve and left the game in the first quarter. Backup Lance Smith scored the Badgers' only touchdown of the first half. John Stocco threw for two touchdowns and Taylor Mehlhaff kicked two field goals in the second half, and the defense held Illinois scoreless throughout the second half to prevail victorious, 30–24.

=== Penn State ===
Penn State vs Wisconsin – Game summary

Quarter	1	2	3	4	Total
Nittany Lions	0	3	0	0	3
No. 17 Badgers	3	7	3	0	13

at Camp Randall Stadium

- Date: November 4, 2006
- Game time: 11:00 a.m.
- Game weather: 42 °F (6 °C); Cloudy; Wind at S 12 MPH
- Game attendance: 81,777
- Referee: Dave Witvoet
- TV: ABC

Game information

First quarter

- WIS – Taylor Mehlhaff 37-yard field goal, 0:01. Wisconsin 3–0. Drive: 10 plays, 60 yards, 5:10.

Second quarter

- PSU – Kevin Kelly 39-yard field goal, 12:17. Tie 3–3. Drive: 9 plays, 58 yards, 2:39.'
- WIS – Paul Hubbard 14-yard pass from John Stocco (Taylor Mehlhaff kick), 0:23. Wisconsin 10–3. Drive: 9 plays, 68 yards, 4:27.

Third quarter

- WIS – Taylor Mehlhaff 20-yard field goal, 2:42. Wisconsin 13–3. Drive: 5 plays, 18 yards, 2:35.

Fourth quarter

No scoring

Top passers

- PSU – Anthony Morelli – 19/35, 165 yards, INT
- WIS – John Stocco – 15/25, 172 yards, TD

Top rushers

- PSU – Tony Hunt – 11 rushes, 35 yards
- WIS – P. J. Hill – 31 rushes, 148 yards

Top receivers

- PSU – Andrew Quarless – 5 receptions, 62 yards
- WIS – Paul Hubbard – 5 receptions, 77 yards, TD

Top defenders

- PSU – Sean Lee – 13 tackles, 2.0 TFL, 2 sacks, forced fumble, fumble recovery
- WIS – Jonathan Casillas – 6 tackles, 2.5 TFL, sack, QB hurry

The Badger defense stepped up in a huge way against Penn State, yielding only a field goal and 244 yards. Consistent pressure frustrated Nittany Lions quarterback Anthony Morelli, and the offense controlled the clock with 148 yards from P. J. Hill, Jr.. The Badgers won 13–3 to move to 9–1 on the season and their sixth straight victory. John Stocco suffered a shoulder injury in the fourth quarter.

This game drew the ire of Penn State head coach Joe Paterno as the first half came to a close. Under the clock rules introduced at the beginning of the season, the clock began running immediately as the ball was kicked, rather than when it was fielded by the receiving team. Following a Stocco touchdown that gave the Badgers a 10–3 lead with 23 seconds to go, Coach Bielema deliberately ordered his kickoff unit to run offsides before Taylor Mehlhaff kicked off. Because the Badgers were offsides (and thus further downfield), the Penn State special teams were unable to field the ball well, and thus would have had awful field position; they instead elected to rekick. Wisconsin repeated the tactic, essentially running out the clock on the first half. Bielema's strategy was decried by many as unsportsmanlike; others praised him for bringing light to a loophole in the new clock system. After the regular season, the clock rules were reverted to their pre-2006 form.

=== Iowa ===
Wisconsin vs Iowa – Game summary

Quarter	1	2	3	4	Total
No. 16 Badgers	10	7	0	7	24
Hawkeyes	0	14	0	7	21

at Kinnick Stadium

- Date: November 11, 2006
- Game time: 11:00 a.m.
- Game weather: 34 °F (1 °C); Cloudy; Wind at N 7 MPH
- Game attendance: 70,585
- Referee: Bill LeMonnier
- TV: ESPN

Game information

First quarter

- WIS – Taylor Mehlhaff 31-yard field goal, 2:16. Wisconsin 3–0. Drive: 8 plays, 34 yards, 4:36.
- WIS – Travis Beckum 3-yard pass from Tyler Donovan (Taylor Mehlhaff kick), 0:51. Wisconsin 10–0. Drive: 2 plays, 26 yards, 0:55.

Second quarter

- IOW – Tony Moeaki 4-yard pass from Drew Tate (Kyle Schlicher kick), 8:27. Wisconsin 10–7. Drive: 7 plays, 88 yards, 3:56.
- IOW – Tom Busch 3-yard pass from Drew Tate (Kyle Schlicher kick), 2:16. Iowa 14–10. Drive: 7 plays, 69 yards, 3:12.
- WIS – Luke Swan 42-yard pass from Tyler Donovan (Taylor Mehlhaff kick), 0:39. Wisconsin 17–14. Drive: 6 plays, 73 yards, 1:37.

Third quarter

No scoring

Fourth quarter

- WIS – P. J. Hill 1-yard TD run (Taylor Mehlhaff kick), 13:49. Wisconsin 24–14. Drive: 15 plays, 97 yards, 7:40.
- IOW – Trey Stross 24-yard pass from Drew Tate (Kyle Schlicher kick), 10:20. Wisconsin 24–21. Drive: 4 plays, 59 yards, 0:44.

Top passers

- IOW – Drew Tate – 10/31, 170 yards, 3 TD, INT
- WIS – Tyler Donovan – 17/24, 228 yards, 2 TD

Top rushers

- IOW – Damian Sims – 7 rushes, 53 yards
- WIS – P. J. Hill – 28 rushes, 77 yards, TD

Top receivers

- IOW – Trey Stross – 1 receptions, 24 yards, TD
- WIS – Luke Swan – 4 receptions, 113 yards, TD

Top defenders

- IOW – Marcus Paschal – 14 tackles, 0.5 TFL, fumble recovery
- WIS – Joe Stellmacher – 5 tackles, 0.5 TFL, 3 pass breakups

After moving up to #16 in the coaches poll, Wisconsin ended a two-game losing streak to the Hawkeyes with a 24–21 victory in Iowa City. With John Stocco sitting out due to injury, backup Tyler Donovan played an efficient game, going 17-of-24 for 228 yards and two touchdowns. Hawkeyes quarterback Drew Tate threw for Iowa's three touchdowns but was frustrated all game, completing fewer than a third of his attempts. With the win, the Badgers completed conference play with a 7–1 mark, wrapping up a second place tie in the Big Ten.

=== Buffalo ===
Bulls vs Badgers – Game summary

Quarter	1	2	3	4	Total
Bulls	3	0	0	0	3
No. 12 Badgers	7	14	7	7	35

at Camp Randall Stadium

- Date: November 18, 2006
- Game time: 11:00 a.m.
- Game weather: 37 °F (3 °C); Cloudy; Wind at N 7 MPH
- Game attendance: 80,850
- Referee: Steve Newman
- TV: ESPNU

Game information

First quarter

- WIS – Paul Hubbard 26-yard pass from Tyler Donovan (Taylor Mehlhaff kick), 14:04. Wisconsin 7–0. Drive: 1 plays, 26 yards, 0:29.
- BUF – Adam Tanalski 34-yard field goal, 11:07. Wisconsin 7–3. Drive: 6 plays, 63 yards, 2:52.

Second quarter

- WIS – P. J. Hill 3-yard TD run (Taylor Mehlhaff kick), 1:24. Wisconsin 14–3. Drive: 6 plays, 80 yards, 1:13.
- WIS – Luke Swan 35-yard pass from Tyler Donovan (Taylor Mehlhaff kick), 0:27. Wisconsin 21–3. Drive: 3 plays, 46 yards, 0:23.

Third quarter

- WIS – Lance Smith 1-yard TD run (Taylor Mehlhaff kick), 4:59. Wisconsin 28–3. Drive: 11 plays, 62 yards, 5:03.

Fourth quarter

- WIS – Dywon Rowan 11-yard TD run (Taylor Mehlhaff kick), 7:59. Wisconsin 35–3. Drive: 4 plays, 24 yards, 2:20.

Top passers

- BUF – Tony Paoli – 6/23, 107 yards, INT
- WIS – Tyler Donovan – 16/26, 308 yards, 2 TD, INT

Top rushers

- BUF – James Starks – 15 rushes, 31 yards
- WIS – P. J. Hill – 19 rushes, 86 yards, TD

Top receivers

- BUF – Naaman Roosevelt – 2 receptions, 90 yards
- WIS – Travis Beckum – 5 receptions, 135 yards

Top defenders

- BUF – Kareem Byrom – 9 tackles, 2.0 TFL, forced fumble
- WIS – Jonathan Casillas – 6 tackles, 0.5 TFL, fumble recovery

On Senior Day, the #10 Badgers started sluggishly, but scored two touchdowns just before halftime and added two more in the second half to win decisively over Buffalo, 35–3. Tyler Donovan once again performed proficiently, throwing for over 300 yards and two touchdowns with an interception on 16-of-26, and the defense forced four turnovers and held Buffalo to just 159 yards. P. J. Hill, Jr. scored a touchdown and picked up 86 yards on the ground.

With the win, the Badgers finished 11–1, the best regular season in school history. There was a minor controversy concerning the Bowl Championship Series, whose rules state that only two teams from one conference may receive bids to BCS bowl games. Ohio State and Michigan were ranked ahead of the Badgers in the final BCS standings, granting those two schools BCS invitations and relegating the Badgers to a lesser bowl. Nevertheless, Wisconsin again accepted an invitation to the Capital One Bowl, where it would defend its championship against Arkansas.

=== Capital One Bowl – Arkansas ===
	1	2	3	4	Total
#13 Arkansas	7	0	0	7	14
#5 Wisconsin	10	7	0	0	17

The Badgers returned to Orlando to face the #13 Razorbacks, led by Heisman Trophy runner-up Darren McFadden. McFadden burst for 45 yards on his first carry but was brought down from behind by Jack Ikegwuonu at the 9-yard line, a pivotal play that led to a missed field goal by Arkansas. The Badgers led 17–7 at halftime behind John Stocco's two touchdown passes, and eventually survived a nailbiting second half in which the Razorbacks continually had great field position but failed to capitalize. Despite being held to -5 rushing yards while giving up 232, including 150 from Arkansas' Felix Jones, the Badgers won 17–14. John Stocco, playing in his final collegiate game, was named the game's MVP.

The Badgers finished the season on a nine-game winning streak to reach #5 in the final coaches poll and #7 in the final AP poll. The 12 wins were a new single season record.

== Statistical achievements ==
The Badgers gained an average of 211.5 passing yards and 161.7 rushing yards per game. On defense, they gave up an average of 138.3 passing yards and 114.8 rushing yards per game.

Quarterback John Stocco completed 158 of 268 passes (59.0%) for 2,185 yards, 17 touchdowns, six interceptions, and a 143.9 passer rating.

Running back P. J. Hill gained 1,569 rushing yards and scored 15 touchdowns on 311 carries, averaging 5.0 yards per carry. He also caught 18 passes for 197 yards and a touchdown. He led the team in scoring with 96 points.

Tight end Travis Beckum was the team's leading receiver, making 61 receptions for 903 yards and five touchdowns. Wide receiver Paul Hubbard was the teams number two receiver with 38 receptions for 627 yards and five touchdowns. Wide receiver Luke Swan followed with 35 receptions for 595 yards and five touchdowns.

Kicker Taylor Mehlhaff converted all 47 extra-point kicks and 15 of 20 field goals for a total of 92 points.

== Awards and honors ==
Offensive tackle Joe Thomas received the Outland Trophy as the nation's best interior lineman. He was the first Wisconsin player to receive the award. He was also a consensus pick on the 2006 All-America team, receiving first-team honors from, among others, the Associated Press, American Football Coaches Association, and Football Writers Association of America.

Running back P. J. Hill was selected by Rivals.com as the national freshman of the year.

Bret Bielema won the Big Ten coach of the year award.

Seven Wisconsin players received first- or second-team honors on the 2006 All-Big Ten Conference football team: Thomas at offensive tackle (Coaches-1, Media-1); Hill at running back (Coaches-1, Media-2); Jack Ikegwuonu at defensive back (Coaches-1, Media-2); Matt Shaughnessy at defensive line (Coaches-2, Media-2); Taylor Mehlhaff at kicker (Coaches-2, Media-2); Travis Beckum at tight end (Media-2); and Roderick Rogers at defensive back (Media-2).

== Personnel ==
=== Roster ===
2006 Wisconsin Badgers football team roster
Players
Coaches
Offense Offensive Line

Pos.	#	Name	Class
WR	11	Isaac Anderson	Fr
RB	24	Josh Balts	Jr
TE	9	Travis Beckum	So
WR	29	Niles Brinkley	Fr
TE	37	Matt Brown	Jr
OL	78	Jake Bscherer	Fr
RB	27	Jerry Butler	Fr
OT	68	Gabe Carimi	Fr
OL	65	Marcus Coleman	Jr
TE	43	Andy Crooks	Jr
TE	45	Kirk DeCremer	Fr
QB	12	Tyler Donovan	Jr
WR	44	Chris Eernisse	Fr
QB	4	Allan Evridge	So
RB	38	Dion Foster	Fr
WR	17	Matt Gifford	Fr
TE	88	Garrett Graham	Fr
WR	2	Xavier Harris	Fr
RB	39	P. J. Hill	Fr
WR	85	Jeff Holzbauer	Sr
WR	19	Paul Hubbard	Jr
WR	22	Diondrae Jenkins	Fr
OL	64	Danny Kaye	Jr
OL	75	Andy Kemp	So
TE	84	Lance Kendricks	Fr
WR	17	Richard Kirtley	Fr
OL	60	Luke Knauf	Jr
WR	20	Derek Konkol	Sr
OL	58	Mike Lenzendorf	Fr
TE	82	Sean Lewis	So
TE	47	Jaevery McFadden	Fr
WR	88	Jarvis Minton	Jr
TE	23	Joseph Molenda	Fr
QB	3	Maurice Moore	Fr
G	76	Bill Nagy	Fr
TE	81	Dave Peck	So
WR	27	Shane Phillips	Fr
TE	48	Nathan Quist	Jr
WR	13	Marcus Randle El	Jr
FB	34	Bill Rentmeester	So
RB	24	Dywon Rowan	Sr
WR	8	Jarmal Ruffin	Fr
QB	18	Dustin Sherer	Fr
RB	5	Lance Smith	Fr
QB	7	John Stocco (C)	Sr
WR	15	Luke Swan	Jr
WR	86	Elijah Theus	Fr
OT	72	Joe Thomas (C)	Sr
QB	16	Scott Tolzien	Fr
TE	36	Mickey Turner	Fr
G	63	Kraig Urbik	So
OL	71	Eric Vanden Heuvel	So
OL	62	Mike Van Someren	Jr
OL	66	Dirk Watters	Fr
OL	70	Andrew Weininger	Jr
RB	48	Dan Wiacek	Fr

Defense

Pos.	#	Name	Class
DB	37	Phil Ayeni	Fr
DL	71	Brian Behnke	Fr
DB	25	Shane Carter	So
DL	77	Dan Cascone	Fr
LB	2	Jonathan Casillas	So
DL	91	Jason Chapman	So
DL	5	Jamal Cooper	Jr
DL	98	Gino Cruse Jr.	So
DB	30	Jameson Davis	So
DB	31	Nate Egholm	Jr
LB	49	Ryan Flasch	So
DB	29	Antonio Freeman	So
DL	73	Mark Gorman	Sr
DB	26	Zach Hampton	Sr
DT	96	Nick Hayden	Jr
DL	59	Brandon Hoey	Fr
LB	52	Elijah Hodge	Fr
LB	12	Casey Hogan	Jr
DB	30	Tyler Holland	Fr
CB	6	Jack Ikegwuonu	Jr
DL	90	Terrance Jamison	So
LB	23	Paul Joran	Sr
DB	20	James Kamoku	Jr
DL	56	Brandon Kelly	Jr
DB	17	Allen Langford	So
LB	38	Ben Landgraf	So
LB	11	DeAndre Levy	So
LB	30	Adam Ludovic	Fr
DB	24	Jamathan Lyle	Fr
DL	74	John Moffitt	Fr
DE	95	Joe Monty	Sr
DB	46	Tony Morrissey	Fr
LB	51	Joshua Neal	So
DB	21	Josh Nettles	Fr
DE	54	Mike Newkirk	So
DL	99	Justin Ostrowski	Jr
DB	28	Aubrey Pleasant	So
DL	55	Adam Purcell	Jr
LB	50	O'Brien Schofield	Fr
CB	22	Roderick Rogers	Sr
DB	32	Kim Royston	Fr
DE	92	Matt Shaughnessy	So
DB	45	Joe Sibley	Jr
DB	14	Culmer St. Jean	Fr
DB	16	Joe Stellmacher	Sr
DB	3	Ben Strickland	Jr
DB	15	Jay Valai	Fr
DL	34	Kurt Ware	Jr
DB	4	Johnny White	Sr
DL	94	Derek Yentz	Jr
LB	41	Mark Zalewski (C)	Sr

Special teams

Pos.	#	Name	Class
P	94	Ken DeBauche	Jr
K	96	Matt Fischer	Fr
LS	57	Steve Johnson	Jr
K	10	Taylor Mehlhaff	Jr
K	98	Adam Schober	So
P	97	Paul Standring	Jr

Head coach

- Bret Bielema

Coordinators/assistant coaches

- Paul Chryst – Offensive coordinator/quarterbacks
- Mike Hankwitz – Defensive coordinator
- Dave Doeren – Co-defensive Coordinator/inside linebackers/recruiting coordinator
- Bob Bostad – Tight ends
- Kerry Cooks – Defensive backs
- Henry Mason – Wide receivers/Assistant Recruiting Coordinator
- Randall McCray – Defensive line
- Bob Palcic – Offensive line
- John Settle – Running backs

Legend

- (C) Team captain
- (S) Suspended
- (I) Ineligible
- Injured
- Redshirt

Roster

=== Regular starters ===
Position	Player
Quarterback	John Stocco
Running back	P. J. Hill
Fullback	Andy Crooks / Bill Rentmeester
Wide receiver	Luke Swan
Wide receiver	Paul Hubbard
Tight end	Travis Beckum
Left tackle	Joe Thomas
Left guard	Andy Kemp
Center	Marcus Coleman
Right guard	Kraig Urbik
Right tackle	Eric Vanden Heuvel

Position	Player
Defensive end	Joe Monty
Defensive tackle	Jason Chapman
Defensive tackle	Nick Hayden
Defensive end	Matt Shaughnessy
Outside linebacker	DeAndre Levy
Middle linebacker	Mark Zalewski
Outside linebacker	Jonathan Casillas
Cornerback	Allen Langford
Strong safety	Joe Stellmacher
Free safety	Roderick Rogers
Cornerback	Jack Ikegwuonu

== 2007 NFL draft ==
The following Wisconsin player was selected in the 2007 NFL draft.

Player	Position	Round	Overall selection	NFL team
Joe Thomas	Offensive tackle	1	3	Cleveland Browns
