= 2007 Wisconsin Badgers football team =

American college football season

2007 Wisconsin Badgers football

Outback Bowl, L 17–21 vs. Tennessee
- Conference: Big Ten Conference

Ranking
- Coaches: No. 21
- AP: No. 24
- Record: 9–4 (5–3 Big Ten)
- Head coach: Bret Bielema (2nd season)
- Offensive coordinator: Paul Chryst (3rd season)
- Offensive scheme: Pro-style
- Defensive coordinator: Mike Hankwitz (2nd season)
- Base defense: 4–3
- MVPs: Tyler Donovan; Matt Shaughnessy
- Captains: Jonathan Casillas; Andy Crooks; Ken DeBauche; Ben Strickland; Luke Swan; 6th captain named each game
- Home stadium: Camp Randall Stadium

2007 Big Ten Conference football standings
	Conf.			Overall
Team	W		L	W		L
No. 5 Ohio State $	7	–	1	11	–	2
No. 18 Michigan	6	–	2	9	–	4
No. 20 Illinois %	6	–	2	9	–	4
No. 24 Wisconsin	5	–	3	9	–	4
Penn State	4	–	4	9	–	4
Iowa	4	–	4	6	–	6
Purdue	3	–	5	8	–	5
Indiana	3	–	5	7	–	6
Michigan State	3	–	5	7	–	6
Northwestern	3	–	5	6	–	6
Minnesota	0	–	8	1	–	11
$ – BCS representative as conference champion; % – BCS at-large representative; Rankings from AP Poll

The 2007 Wisconsin Badgers football team was an American football team that represented the University of Wisconsin–Madison as a member of the Big Ten Conference during the 2007 NCAA Division I FBS football season. In their second year under head coach Bret Bielema, the Badgers compiled a 9–4 record (5–3 in conference games), finished in fourth place in the Big Ten, and outscored opponents by a total of 383 to 301. Against ranked opponents, the Badgers lost to No. 1 Ohio State and defeated No. 13 Michigan. They concluded the season with a 21–17 loss to No. 16 Tennessee in the Outback Bowl. They were ranked No. 24 and No. 21, respectively, in the final AP and Coaches polls.

The team's statistical leaders included running back P. J. Hill (1,212 rushing yards, 15 touchdowns), quarterback Tyler Donovan (2,607 passing yards, 133.96 passer rating), tight end Travis Beckum (75 receptions for 982 yards), kicker Taylor Mehlhaff (105 points scored), and linebacker Jonathan Casillas (57 solo tackles, 96 total tackles).

The team played its home games at Camp Randall Stadium in Madison, Wisconsin.

== Schedule ==
Date	Time	Opponent	Rank	Site	TV	Result	Attendance	Source
September 1	2:30 p.m.	Washington State*	No. 7	Camp Randall Stadium; Madison, WI	ABC	W 42–21	81,547	
September 8	9:00 p.m.	at UNLV*	No. 5	Sam Boyd Stadium; Whitney, NV	Versus	W 20–13	38,250	
September 15	11:00 a.m.	The Citadel*	No. 7	Camp Randall Stadium; Madison, WI	BTN	W 45–31	80,327	
September 22	7:00 p.m.	Iowa	No. 9	Camp Randall Stadium; Madison, WI (rivalry)	ABC	W 17–13	82,630	
September 29	2:30 p.m.	Michigan State	No. 9	Camp Randall Stadium; Madison, WI	ABC	W 37–34	82,164	
October 6	11:00 a.m.	at Illinois	No. 5	Memorial Stadium; Champaign, IL	ESPN	L 26–31	57,078	
October 13	2:30 p.m.	at Penn State	No. 19	Beaver Stadium; University Park, PA	ABC	L 7–38	109,754	
October 20	11:00 a.m.	Northern Illinois*		Camp Randall Stadium; Madison, WI	BTN	W 44–3	81,883	
October 27	11:00 a.m.	Indiana^{†}	No. 25	Camp Randall Stadium; Madison, WI	BTN	W 33–3	81,324	
November 3	11:00 a.m.	at No. 1 Ohio State	No. 19	Ohio Stadium; Columbus, OH	BTN	L 17–38	105,449	
November 10	11:00 a.m.	No. 13 Michigan		Camp Randall Stadium; Madison, WI	ESPN	W 37–21	82,352	
November 17	2:30 p.m.	at Minnesota	No. 24	Hubert H. Humphrey Metrodome; Minneapolis, MN (rivalry)	BTN	W 41–34	59,116	
January 1, 2008	11:00 a.m.	vs. No. 16 Tennessee*	No. 18	Raymond James Stadium; Tampa, FL (Outback Bowl)	ESPN	L 17–21	60,121	
*Non-conference game; ^{†}Homecoming; Rankings from AP Poll released prior to the game; All times are in Central time

== Game summaries ==
=== Washington State ===
	1	2	3	4	Total
Cougars	14	0	7	0	21
Badgers	14	14	0	14	42

=== UNLV ===
	1	2	3	4	Total
Badgers	0	9	0	11	20
Rebels	7	0	3	3	13

=== The Citadel ===
	1	2	3	4	Total
Bulldogs	7	14	0	10	31
Badgers	7	14	10	14	45

=== Iowa ===
	1	2	3	4	Total
Hawkeyes	0	10	0	3	13
Badgers	0	7	0	10	17

=== Michigan State ===
	1	2	3	4	Total
Spartans	14	7	3	10	34
Badgers	7	20	7	3	37

=== Illinois ===
	1	2	3	4	Total
Badgers	0	6	13	7	26
Fighting Illini	7	10	7	7	31

Wisconsin's dreams of an undefeated season were snapped in Champaign-Urbana, as the Illini stunned the 5th ranked Badgers 31–25. A poor showing by the Badgers, combined with excellent efforts across the board for the Illini, sunk the Badgers, who fell to 2–1 in the Big Ten and 5–1 overall despite an incredible effort by QB Tyler Donovan, who completed 27 passes on 49 attempts for 392 yards and 2 TDs. Illinois's defense sacked Donovan twice and forced a pair of INTs (one by Vontae Davis, the other by Kevin Mitchell). Illinois RB Rashard Mendenhall ran wild on the Badgers for 160 yards and 2 TDs on just 19 carries, and QB Juice Williams dissected Wisconsin through the air and on the ground. Williams completed 12 passes on 19 attempts for 121 yards, and ran for 92 yards on 14 carries.

=== Penn State ===
	1	2	3	4	Total
Badgers	7	0	0	0	7
Nittany Lions	10	14	7	7	38

Wisconsin RB P.J. Hill fumbled on his very first carry of the game, and Wisconsin simply collapsed in Happy Valley, losing 38–7 to Penn State. Wisconsin QB Tyler Donovan had a bad game, as he threw 2 INTs, was sacked 5 times, and averaged just 1.1 YPC on 11 carries. The Wisconsin defense, put in often impossible situations by the ineptitude of their offense (Wisconsin turned the ball over 3 times and committed 8 penalties), caved under pressure from Penn State. Wisconsin P Ken Debauche punted 6 times on the day.

Penn State RB Rodney Kinlaw ran for 115 yards and a touchdown on 23 carries, and WR Deon Butler caught 7 passes for 93 yards and the only passing touchdown of the day by either team. However, the leading receiver of the game was Wisconsin WR Kyle Jefferson, who caught 6 passes for 124 yards.

=== Northern Illinois ===
	1	2	3	4	Total
Huskies	0	0	3	0	3
Badgers	14	17	10	3	44

=== Indiana ===
	1	2	3	4	Total
Hoosiers	0	3	0	0	3
Badgers	10	7	7	9	33

=== Ohio State ===
	1	2	3	4	Total
Badgers	3	0	14	0	17
Buckeyes	7	3	7	21	38

At one point in the game, Wisconsin led Ohio State 17–10, but a big 4th quarter from the Buckeyes offense and defense secured an eventual Ohio State victory. The game snapped a 2-game winning streak by the Badgers over Ohio State (from the 2003 and 2004 seasons) and improved Jim Tressel's record to 2–3 against Wisconsin.

=== Michigan ===
	1	2	3	4	Total
Wolverines	0	7	0	14	21
Badgers	7	13	3	14	37

Wisconsin pounded Lloyd Carr's Michigan team 37–21 for their second consecutive home win over the Wolverines, and Bret Bielema's second win over a ranked opponent (his first was against Michigan State). Carr benched both QB Chad Henne and RB Mike Hart so they would both be healthy against Ohio State next week.

Wisconsin rattled off 17 unanswered points to open the game; starting with a Travis Beckum touchdown reception off a 10-yard pass from Tyler Donovan, a Taylor Mehlhaff field goal, and a 2-yard TD run by Donovan. Michigan answered with a 12-yard touchdown pass from Ryan Mallett to WR Mario Manningham for their only score of the first half. Wisconsin got another Mehlhaff FG with 0:15 remaining in the half and led 20–7 at halftime.

Both teams had a sluggish third quarter; the only points scored by either team came on a 19-yard FG by Taylor Mehlhaff for Wisconsin. However, Wisconsin and Michigan scored a pair of touchdowns apiece in the 4th quarter; Michigan getting a record setting 97-yard touchdown reception by Mario Manningham and a 26-yard TD pass from Mallett to WR Adrian Arrington and Wisconsin answering with a pair of touchdown runs by RB Zach Brown.

Wisconsin's starting RB P.J. Hill managed a grand total of 14 yards on 5 carries. Zach Brown, his backup, ran for 108 yards on 28 carries with a pair of TDs. Wisconsin WR Paul Hubbard made 7 receptions for 134 yards, and TE Travis Beckum caught 6 passes for 106 yards with a touchdown reception.

The Badgers improved to 8–3 on the year, and face 1-10 Minnesota next week in Minneapolis. With a win over Ohio State next week, Michigan could win the Big Ten outright.

=== Minnesota ===
	1	2	3	4	Total
Badgers	3	7	10	21	41
Golden Gophers	3	10	7	14	34

=== Tennessee ===
	1	2	3	4	Total
Badgers	7	7	3	0	17
Tennessee	7	14	0	0	21

== Personnel ==
=== Roster ===
2007 Wisconsin Badgers football team roster
Players
Coaches
Offense

Pos.	#	Name	Class
TE	9	Travis Beckum	Jr
OT	68	Gabe Carimi	Fr
TE	43	Andy Crooks (C)	Sr
QB	12	Tyler Donovan	Sr
TB	39	P. J. Hill	So
WR	19	Paul Hubbard	Sr
WR	1	Luke Swan (C)	Sr
QB	16	Scott Tolzien	Fr
G	63	Kraig Urbik	Jr

Defense

Pos.	#	Name	Class
LB	2	Jonathan Casillas (C)	Jr
CB	6	Jack Ikegwuonu	Sr
DE	90	Terrance Jamison	Jr
LB	11	DeAndre Levy	Jr
DE	54	Mike Newkirk	Jr
DB	7	Aaron Henry	Fr
CB	3	Ben Strickland (C)	Sr
DB		Jay Valai	Fr
DB		Aubrey Pleasant	Fr

Special teams

Pos.	#	Name	Class
P	94	Ken DeBauche (C)	Sr
K	10	Taylor Mehlhaff	Sr

Head coach

- Bret Bielema

Coordinators/assistant coaches

- Paul Chryst – Offensive coordinator/quarterbacks
- Mike Hankwitz – Defensive coordinator
- Dave Doeren – Co-defensive coordinator/inside linebackers/recruiting coordinator
- Del Alexander – Wide receivers
- Bob Bostad – Tight ends/run game coordinator
- Kerry Cooks – Defensive backs
- Henry Mason – Associate head coach/wide receivers/assistant recruiting coordinator
- Randall McCray – Defensive line
- Bob Palcic – Offensive line
- John Settle – Running backs

Legend

- (C) Team captain
- (S) Suspended
- (I) Ineligible
- Injured
- Redshirt

=== Regular starters ===
Position	Player
Quarterback	Tyler Donovan
Running back	P. J. Hill
Fullback	Chris Pressley
Wide receiver	Luke Swan
Wide receiver	Paul Hubbard
Tight end	Travis Beckum
Left tackle	Gabe Carimi
Left guard	Andy Kemp
Center	Marcus Coleman
Right guard	Kraig Urbik
Right tackle	Eric Vanden Heuvel

Position	Player
Defensive end	Mike Newkirk
Defensive tackle	Jason Chapman
Defensive tackle	Nick Hayden
Defensive end	Matt Shaughnessy
Outside linebacker	DeAndre Levy
Middle linebacker	Elijah Hodge
Outside linebacker	Jonathan Casillas
Cornerback	Allen Langford
Strong safety	Aubrey Pleasant
Free safety	Shane Carter
Cornerback	Jack Ikegwuonu

== Team players selected in the 2008 NFL draft ==
Player	Position	Round	Overall Selection	NFL team
Jack Ikegwuonu	Cornerback	4	131	Philadelphia Eagles
Taylor Mehlhaff	Kicker	6	178	New Orleans Saints
Nick Hayden	Defensive tackle	6	182	Carolina Panthers
Paul Hubbard	Wide receiver	6	191	Cleveland Browns
