= 2006 Arkansas Razorbacks football team =

American college football season

2006 Arkansas Razorbacks football

SEC Western Division champion

SEC Championship Game, L 28–38 vs. Florida

Capital One Bowl, L 14–17 vs. Wisconsin
- Conference: Southeastern Conference
- Western Division

Ranking
- Coaches: No. 16
- AP: No. 15
- Record: 10–4 (7–1 SEC)
- Head coach: Houston Nutt (9th season)
- Offensive coordinator: Gus Malzahn (1st season)
- Offensive scheme: Spread option
- Defensive coordinator: Reggie Herring (2nd season)
- Base defense: 4–3
- Captains: Keith Jackson; Sam Olajubutu; Desmond Sims; Zac Tubbs; Tony Ugoh; Darius Vinnett
- Home stadium: Donald W. Reynolds Razorback Stadium; War Memorial Stadium

2006 Southeastern Conference football standings
	Conf.			Overall
Team	W		L	W		L
Eastern Division
No. 1 Florida x$#	7	–	1	13	–	1
No. 25 Tennessee	5	–	3	9	–	4
No. 23 Georgia	4	–	4	9	–	4
Kentucky	4	–	4	8	–	5
South Carolina	3	–	5	8	–	5
Vanderbilt	1	–	7	4	–	8
Western Division
No. 15 Arkansas x	7	–	1	10	–	4
No. 9 Auburn	6	–	2	11	–	2
No. 3 LSU %	6	–	2	11	–	2
Alabama	2	–	6	6	–	7
Ole Miss	2	–	6	4	–	8
Mississippi State	1	–	7	3	–	9
Championship: Florida 38, Arkansas 28
# – BCS National Champion; $ – BCS representative as conference champion; % – BCS at-large representative; x – Division champion/co-champions; Alabama had all victories vacated by the NCAA in 2010. As such, the official record for Alabama is 0–7 (0–6).; Rankings from AP Poll

The 2006 Arkansas Razorbacks football team represented the University of Arkansas as a member of the Southeastern Conference (SEC) during the 2006 NCAA Division I FBS football season. Led by ninth-year head coach Houston Nutt, the Razorbacks compiled an overall record of 10–4 with a mark of 7–1 in conference play, winning the SEC's Western Division title. Arkansas advanced to the SEC Championship Game, which the Razorbacks lost to eventual national champion, Florida. Arkansas was then invited to the Capital One Bowl, where the Razorbacks lost to Wisconsin. The team played six home games at Donald W. Reynolds Razorback Stadium in Fayetteville, Arkansas and two home games at War Memorial Stadium in Little Rock, Arkansas.

Running back Darren McFadden finished second in voting for the Heisman Trophy.

== Schedule ==
Date	Time	Opponent	Rank	Site	TV	Result	Attendance	Source
September 2	7:45 pm	No. 6 USC*		Donald W. Reynolds Razorback Stadium; Fayetteville, AR	ESPN	L 14–50	76,564	
September 9	6:00 pm	Utah State*		Donald W. Reynolds Razorback Stadium; Fayetteville, AR		W 20–0	69,491	
September 16	11:30 am	at Vanderbilt		Vanderbilt Stadium; Nashville, TN	LFS	W 21–19	32,202	
September 23	2:30 pm	Alabama		Donald W. Reynolds Razorback Stadium; Fayetteville, AR	CBS	W 24–23 ^{2OT}	74,687	
October 7	11:00 am	at No. 2 Auburn		Jordan–Hare Stadium; Auburn, AL	CBS	W 27–10	87,451	
October 14	1:00 pm	Southeast Missouri State*^{†}	No. 17	Donald W. Reynolds Razorback Stadium; Fayetteville, AR		W 63–7	72,453	
October 21	11:30 am	Ole Miss	No. 15	Donald W. Reynolds Razorback Stadium; Fayetteville, AR (rivalry)	LFS	W 38–3	73,445	
October 28	6:00 pm	Louisiana–Monroe*	No. 13	War Memorial Stadium; Little Rock, AR	ESPNU	W 44–10	55,420	
November 4	6:45 pm	at South Carolina	No. 12	Williams–Brice Stadium; Columbia, SC	ESPN	W 26–20	74,926	
November 11	6:00 pm	No. 13 Tennessee	No. 11	Donald W. Reynolds Razorback Stadium; Fayetteville, AR (College GameDay)	ESPN2	W 31–14	76,728	
November 18	1:30 pm	at Mississippi State	No. 5	Davis Wade Stadium; Starkville, MS		W 28–14	41,845	
November 24	1:30 pm	No. 9 LSU	No. 5	War Memorial Stadium; Little Rock, AR (rivalry)	CBS	L 26–31	55,833	
December 2	5:00 pm	vs. No. 4 Florida	No. 8	Georgia Dome; Atlanta, GA (SEC Championship Game)	CBS	L 28–38	73,374	
January 1	12:00 pm	vs. No. 6 Wisconsin*	No. 12	Florida Citrus Bowl; Orlando, FL (Capital One Bowl)	ABC	L 14–17	60,774	
*Non-conference game; ^{†}Homecoming; Rankings from AP Poll released prior to the game; All times are in Central time

== Rankings ==
Ranking movements Legend: ██ Increase in ranking ██ Decrease in ranking — = Not ranked RV = Received votes
	Week															
Poll	Pre	1	2	3	4	5	6	7	8	9	10	11	12	13	14	Final
AP	RV	—	—	RV	RV	RV	17	15	13	12	11	5	5	8	12	15
Coaches	RV	—	—	RV	RV	RV	23	18	14	12	11	6	5	8	13	16
Harris	Not released				RV	RV	22	17	14	12	11	6	6	8	13	Not released
BCS	Not released							13	13	13	11	7	6	9	12	Not released

== Game summaries ==
=== USC ===
	1	2	3	4	Total
USC	3	13	14	20	50
Arkansas	0	7	0	7	14

USC and Arkansas both came into the game with a number of question marks, as USC had lost stars Reggie Bush and Matt Leinart to the NFL, and Arkansas's star running back Darren McFadden was injured in an off-field incident. Although the game was close until the latter minutes of the second quarter, a combination of USC's high-powered offense wearing out Arkansas's defense, and running back Felix Jones' three fumbles, stretched the margin in the second half to the final score.

Robert Johnson was removed as the starting quarterback this week, replaced by Mitch Mustain.

=== Utah State ===
	1	2	3	4	Total
Utah State	0	0	0	0	0
Arkansas	0	14	6	0	20

After the Razorbacks' loss at home against the USC Trojans, the Hogs were looking to bounce back against Utah State. Mustain had replaced Johnson as the starting quarterback, but the Arkansas offense stalled early, losing a fumble at the Aggie 1-yard line. But under the shoulders of McFadden and Jones, Arkansas bounced back for 3 touchdowns. The Arkansas defense played valiantly in showing of revenge for the embarrassment of the previous game, and the offense, while not up to form, still played well. This was the Razorbacks last shutout until November 15, 2014, when Arkansas beat LSU, 17-0.

=== Vanderbilt ===
	1	2	3	4	Total
Arkansas	7	7	7	0	21
Vanderbilt	7	6	0	6	19

In Week 3, Arkansas traveled to Vanderbilt University for its first away game of the season. This game proved to be a good early match against two teams not predicted to fare well in SEC play. The game began with alternating possessions, but neither team took a large lead. But at the end of the first half, a busted extra point attempt by the Commodores gave Arkansas a 14–13 lead. During the fourth quarter, Arkansas and Vanderbilt both scored, but because of Vanderbilt's situation, they opted to go for a two-point conversion, and failed. Although they got one last possession, a missed field goal ended Vanderbilt's chance of victory.

=== Alabama ===
	1	2	3	4	OT	2OT	Total
#22 Alabama	0	10	0	7	0	6	23
Arkansas	3	0	14	0	0	7	24

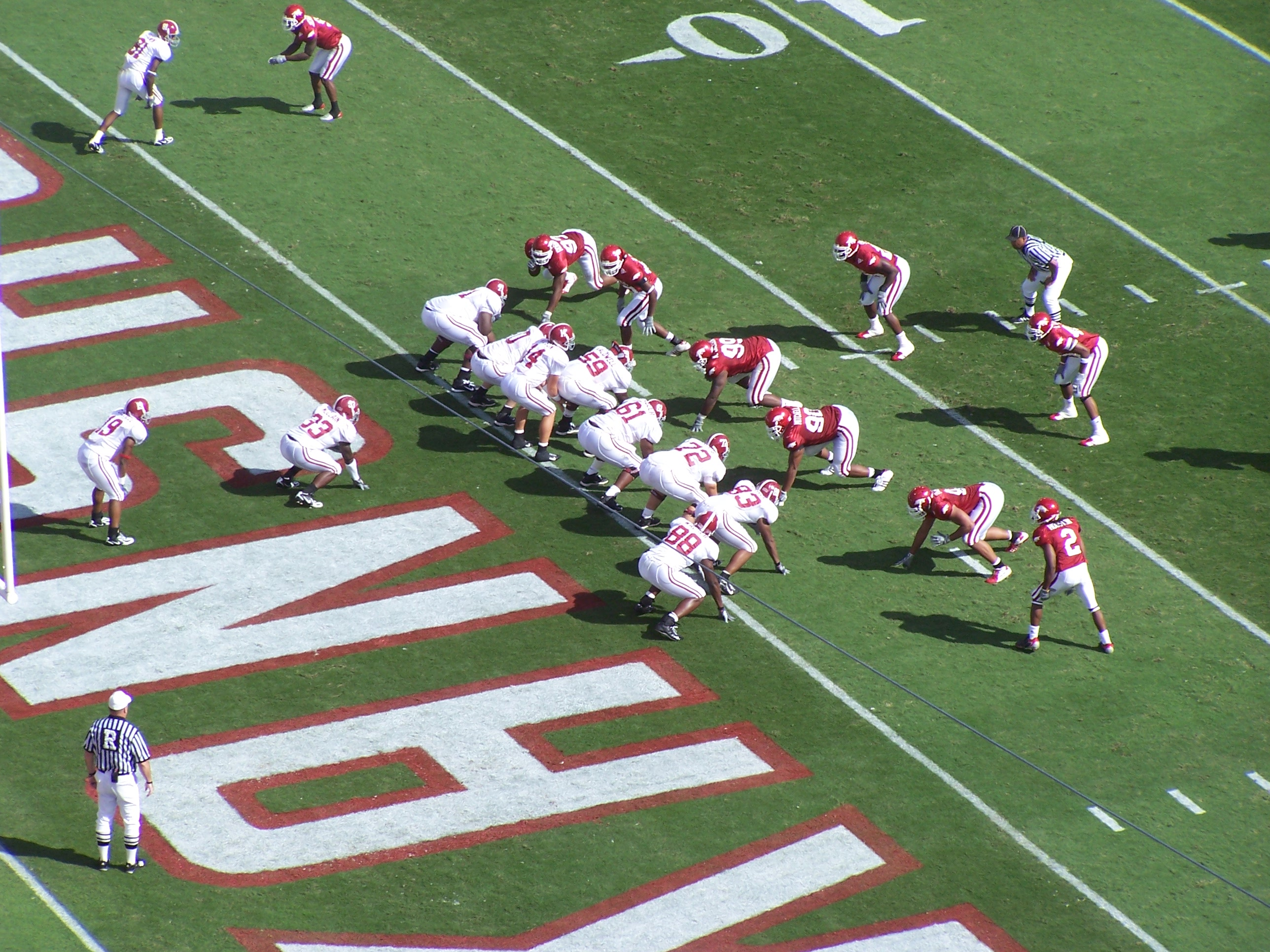
The Crimson Tide offense (white) backed up on their goalline.

This game was well played by both teams playing evenly matched with Alabama leading at halftime 10–3. However Arkansas bounced back with a touchdown from Darren McFadden and a fumble return for a touchdown by Randy Kelly, making the score 17–10 at the end of the third quarter in favor of the Razorbacks. Alabama answered by scoring a touchdown in the fourth, tying the game and eventually sending it into overtime. During regulation, Alabama kicker Leigh Tiffin had missed two field goal attempts wide right. And after a scoreless first overtime, the Crimson Tide scored but again missed the extra point. On the next series quarterback Mitch Mustain threw a touchdown pass to tight end Ben Cleveland to tie the game, and the Razorbacks won it with a completed extra point by Jeremy Davis. Through the end of the 2021 season, this was the last time Arkansas defeated Alabama. (A 2007 Alabama victory was subsequently vacated by the NCAA).

=== Auburn ===
	1	2	3	4	Total
Arkansas	10	7	7	3	27
#2 Auburn	0	10	0	0	10

In an SEC West bout, the Arkansas Razorbacks visited the #2 ranked Auburn Tigers at Jordan-Hare Stadium. The Hogs scored first with a 34-yard field goal by Jeremy Davis to make it 3–0 with 7:56 left in the first quarter. Arkansas scored again with a 50-yard pass from Mitch Mustain to Marcus Monk to make it a surprising 10–0 lead with 3:43 remaining in the first quarter. On the first play of the second quarter Auburn countered with a 24-yard TD strike from Brandon Cox to Rodgeriqus Smith to make the score 10–7. With 5:00 left to go in the first half, Arkansas came back with Darren McFadden running for a 63-yard TD making it 17–7. However, Auburn kicker John Vaughn kicked a 36-yard field goal to make the score 17–10 with 1:50 remaining in the first half. After the half, it was all Arkansas as their defense kept Auburn from scoring. With 4:54 left in the third quarter Felix Jones ran in a 1-yard TD. And with 3:34 left in the game, Arkansas sealed it with a 22-yard field goal from Jeremy Davis. With the win the Hogs had control of their own destiny in the SEC West.

=== Southeast Missouri State ===
	1	2	3	4	Total
Southeast Missouri State	0	0	7	0	7
#23 Arkansas	14	28	14	7	63

On Arkansas' homecoming they faced the Redhawks from Southeast Missouri State. From the get-go, it was clear Arkansas was going to dominate this game. Darren McFadden scored the first two touchdowns making it 14–0 at the end of the first quarter. In the second quarter the Hogs burst wide open and scored four touchdowns; two coming from Felix Jones and one coming from Michael Smith, and an interception return by DT Keith Jackson. At the Half, the score was 42–0. The Hogs scored three times in the second half, with the Redhawks only score coming in the third quarter by an 8-yard run from John Radney. The final score was 63–7.

=== Ole Miss ===
	1	2	3	4	Total
Ole Miss	0	3	0	0	3
#18 Arkansas	14	7	7	10	38

In an SEC West match, #18 Arkansas Razorbacks squared off with the Ole Miss Rebels at Razorback Stadium. Felix Jones returned the opening kickoff 100 yards for a touchdown making the score 7–0. Darren McFadden ran in the next score from 4 yards to make the score 14–0 with 9:43 left in the first quarter. Peyton Hillis scored from 1 yard out to make it 21–0 with 8:27 left in the second quarter. Ole Miss scored a field goal by Joshua Shene from 27 yards out to make it 21–3. After the half, Darren McFadden scored with a 70-yard screen pass from Mitch Mustain making it 28–3. In the fourth, Arkansas scored on a Jeremy Davis field goal and a London Crawford touchdown catch making it 38–3 at the final. With this win, Arkansas became bowl eligible after a two-year absence.

=== Louisiana–Monroe ===
	1	2	3	4	Total
#14 Arkansas	6	16	14	7	43
Louisiana–Monroe	7	0	0	3	10

The 14th ranked Arkansas Razorbacks returned to Little Rock to face the Sun Belt's Louisiana–Monroe Warhawks. The Warhawks struck first with a 17-yard pass from Kinsmon Lancaster to Lagregory Sapp for a TD. With the score 7–0, the Warhawks were fired up. With 7:41 left in the first quarter, Felix Jones rushed in a 7-yard TD, however Jeremy Davis missed the extra point to make the score 7–6. Arkansas scored in the second quarter with a 12-yard TD pass from Mitch Mustain to Marcus Monk, and completed a two-point conversion to make it 14–7. With 4:14 left in the first half, the Warhawks' Calvin Dawson was tackled in their own endzone for a safety making it 16–7. Nearing the end of the first half, RB Darren McFadden threw a 10-yard TD pass to Wes Murphy. The score at the Half was 23–7. In the third quarter, Darren McFadden rushed 18 yards for a touchdown but was flagged for excessive celebration. The penalty was counted on the extra point and Jeremy Davis missed it and the score was 29–7. Later, Mitch Mustain threw a 12-yard TD pass to Marcus Monk, and a two-point conversion made it 37–7. In the fourth, Michael Smith rushed for a 3-yard TD to make it 44–7. The Warhawks scored a field goal late in the game to make the final 44–10.

=== South Carolina ===
	1	2	3	4	Total
#12 Arkansas	7	16	3	0	26
South Carolina	3	3	7	7	20

The 12th ranked Arkansas Razorbacks went on the road to face a dangerous South Carolina Gamecocks team at Williams-Brice Stadium in Columbia, South Carolina. The Gamecocks scored on their second drive with a field goal from 3 yards by Ryan Succop after an interception gave South Carolina great field position. Arkansas countered with a 43-yard TD run from Darren McFadden making the score 7–3 at the end of the first quarter. In the second quarter, Darren McFadden rushed for a 14-yard TD to make the score 14–3. With 9:19 remaining in the first half, the Gamecocks scored another field goal from Ryan Succop to make it 14–6. Arkansas then blocked a punt and the Gamecocks recovered it in their own endzone for a safety to make it 16–6. And with 0:02 left in the first half, Casey Dick threw a 50-yard hail- mary that was tipped off two Gamecock defenders and into the hands of Marcus Monk to make it 23–6 going into the half. During the half, Steve Spurrier replaced Gamecock quarterback Syvelle Newton with Blake Mitchell who came out swingin'. After an Arkansas field goal, Mitchell threw 13-yard TD pass to Kenny McKinley to make it 26–13 at the end of the third. In the fourth, Mitchell threw a 10-yard TD pass to Sydney Rice to make it 26–20. After a missed field goal by Arkansas, Mitchell drove the field in an attempt to win the game but was intercepted by Darius Vinnet to make the final 26–20. In this game Houston Nutt switched quarterback Mitch Mustain with Casey Dick.

=== Tennessee ===
	1	2	3	4	Total
#13 Tennessee	0	7	0	7	14
#11 Arkansas	7	21	0	3	31

ESPN's College Game Day came to Fayetteville this week to host the matchup between the 11th ranked Arkansas Razorbacks and the 13th ranked Tennessee Volunteers. In the first quarter, Casey Dick threw a 10-yard TD pass to Marcus Monk for a 7–0 lead. In the second quarter, Darren McFadden ran 17 yards for a TD to make it 14–0. Tennessee bounced back with a 27-yard TD pass from Jonathan Crompton to Robert Meachem to make the score 14–7. With 6:51 remaining in the half, Darren McFadden threw a 12 TD pass to Marcus Monk to make it 21–7. Darren McFadden also ran in a 5-yard TD score to end the half with a score of 28–7. After a scoreless third quarter Arkansas hit a 28-yard field goal while Jonathan Crompton hit Bret Smith for a 39-yard TD pass late in the game to make the final 31–14.

=== Mississippi State ===
	1	2	3	4	Total
#6 Arkansas	14	7	7	0	28
Mississippi State	7	7	0	0	14

The 6th ranked Arkansas Razorbacks visited the Mississippi State Bulldogs at Scott Field in Starkville, MS. In the first quarter, Mississippi State was threatening to score when Arkansas CB Chris Houston intercepted a pass and returned it 87 yards for a TD. Miss. St. countered with a 65-yard TD run from Anthony Dixon. This made the score 7–7. On the ensuing kickoff, Darren McFadden returned it 92 yards for a TD making the score 14–7. In the second quarter the Bulldogs fought back with a 22-yard TD strike from Michael Henig to Tony Burks. With :41 left in the half, Casey Dick threw a 29-yard TD pass to Damian Williams. The score at the half was 21–14. In the third quarter, Casey Dick threw another TD pass for 35 yards to Marcus Monk. With a scoreless fourth quarter, the final score was 28–14. With this win, Arkansas clinched the SEC Western Division Title.

=== LSU ===
	1	2	3	4	Total
#8 LSU	7	7	3	14	31
#5 Arkansas	6	6	0	14	26

The 9th ranked LSU Tigers came to Little Rock to visit the 5th ranked Arkansas Razorbacks at War Memorial Stadium. Arkansas scored quickly when Darren McFadden ran in a 1-yard TD run, but Jeremy Davis missed the extra point. LSU stormed back to score on a 29 TD run by Keiland Williams to make the score 7–6. In the second quarter, JaMarcus Russell threw a 47-yard TD pass to Craig Davis. Arkansas came back with a 21-yard TD pass from Casey Dick to Mike Rhim, but failed to score on the two-point conversion making the score 14–12 at the half. In the third quarter, Colt David hit a field goal for LSU to make it 17–12. In the fourth, JaMarcus Russell threw a 7-yard TD pass to Early Doucet. On the next Arkansas play, Darren McFadden ran 80 yards for a TD to make the score 24–19. On the ensuing kickoff, Trindon Holliday returned it 92 yards for a TD. With 4:53 left, Felix Jones ran in for a 5-yard score. LSU held on to win 31–26.

=== Florida—SEC Championship Game ===
	1	2	3	4	Total
#8 Arkansas	0	7	14	7	28
#4 Florida	3	14	7	14	38

The two divisional champions; the East's Florida Gators, and the West's Arkansas Razorbacks, faced off in the SEC Championship Game at the Georgia Dome in Atlanta, Georgia. Florida scored first with a 33-yard field goal from Chris Hetland. In the second quarter Florida's QB Chris Leak ran 9 yards for a TD to make it 10–0. Chris Leak then threw a 37-yard TD pass to Percy Harvin. Arkansas fought back with a 48-yard TD pass from Casey Dick to Marcus Monk to make the score 17–7 at the half. In the third quarter Arkansas' Darren McFadden threw a 2-yard TD pass to Felix Jones. With 8:33 left in the third, Arkansas' Antwain Robinson intercepted a pitch from Florida's Chris Leak and returned it for a TD to make the score 21–17. With 3:47 remaining in the third, Arkansas PR Reggie Fish muffed a punt and the fumble was recovered by Florida's Wondy Pierre-Louis for a TD making it 24–21. In the fourth, Percy Harvin ran 67 yards for a TD to make the score 31–21. Arkansas came back with a 29-yard TD pass from Cedric Washington to Felix Jones to make the score 31–28. On the next possession, Florida's Andre Caldwell threw a 5-yard TD pass to Tate Casey. Florida held Arkansas and won the SEC, 38–28.

=== Wisconsin—Capital One Bowl ===
	1	2	3	4	Total
#13 Arkansas	7	0	0	7	14
#5 Wisconsin	10	7	0	0	17

The 15th ranked Arkansas Razorbacks went to Orlando, Florida to the Capital One Bowl to face the 7th ranked Wisconsin Badgers. Wisconsin struck first by scoring a 52-yard field goal from Taylor Mehlhaff. Arkansas came back and scored on a 76-yard TD run by Felix Jones to make the score 7–3. Wisconsin answered with a 22-yard TD pass from John Stocco to Paul Hubbard. In the second quarter, Wisconsin scored on a 13-yard TD pass from John Stocco to Travis Beckum to make it 17–7 at the half. In the fourth quarter, Felix Jones ran for a 12-yard TD. Wisconsin held on to win the Capital One Bowl 17–14.

== Roster ==
2006 Arkansas Razorbacks football team roster
Players
Coaches
Offense

Pos.	#	Name	Class
QB	11	Mitch Mustain	So
G	61	Robert Felton	Jr
OT	75	Nate Garner	Jr
FB	22	Peyton Hillis	Jr
RB	25	Felix Jones	So
C	63	Jonathan Luigs	So
RB	5	Darren McFadden	So
WR	85	Marcus Monk	Jr
QB	7	Alex Mortensen	So
G	74	Stephen Parker	Sr
G	57	Mitch Petrus	So
OT	69	Zac Tubbs	Sr
OT	66	Tony Ugoh	Sr
OT	78	Jose Valdez	So

Defense

Pos.	#	Name	Class
DE	92	Jamaal Anderson	Jr
DT	55	Marcus Harrison	Jr
DT	99	Keith Jackson	Sr

Special teams

Pos.	#	Name	Class

Head coach

- Houston Nutt

Coordinators/assistant coaches

- Mike Markuson – Offensive line

Legend

- (C) Team captain
- (S) Suspended
- (I) Ineligible
- Injured
- Redshirt

== After the season ==
Though Arkansas had a strong year, turmoil developed on the team. The largest conflict occurred between head coach Houston Nutt and offensive coordinator Gus Malzahn over the direction of the offense. Malzahn came to Arkansas in 2006 from Springdale High School with some of his players who had committed to Arkansas, including QB Mitch Mustain and WR Damian Williams. These players felt that Malzahn would be able to implement his spread, no-huddle offense at Arkansas. Over the course of the season, speculation arose that this offense was not being implemented and that Malzahn had less control over the offense than he was promised, claims that Malzahn has not verified publicly. Some of the parents of these players met with Arkansas athletic director Frank Broyles in December to question the role of their sons on the team. After the season, Williams and Mustain transferred to the University of Southern California (USC). Malzahn left to be the offensive coordinator at Tulsa and wide receiver Andrew Norman transferred to Tulsa as well.

In the offseason, fans raised questions about Houston Nutt's handling of recruits, management of the offense, and off-the-field relationships. Certain fans filed Freedom of Information requests for Nutt's phone records. However, a number of fans remained strongly supportive of Nutt. The rift that formed in the fanbase over these issues ultimately contributed to Nutt's departure after the 2007 regular season, just after the Razorbacks upset the number one team in the nation, LSU.
