= Felix Jones =

American football player (born 1987)

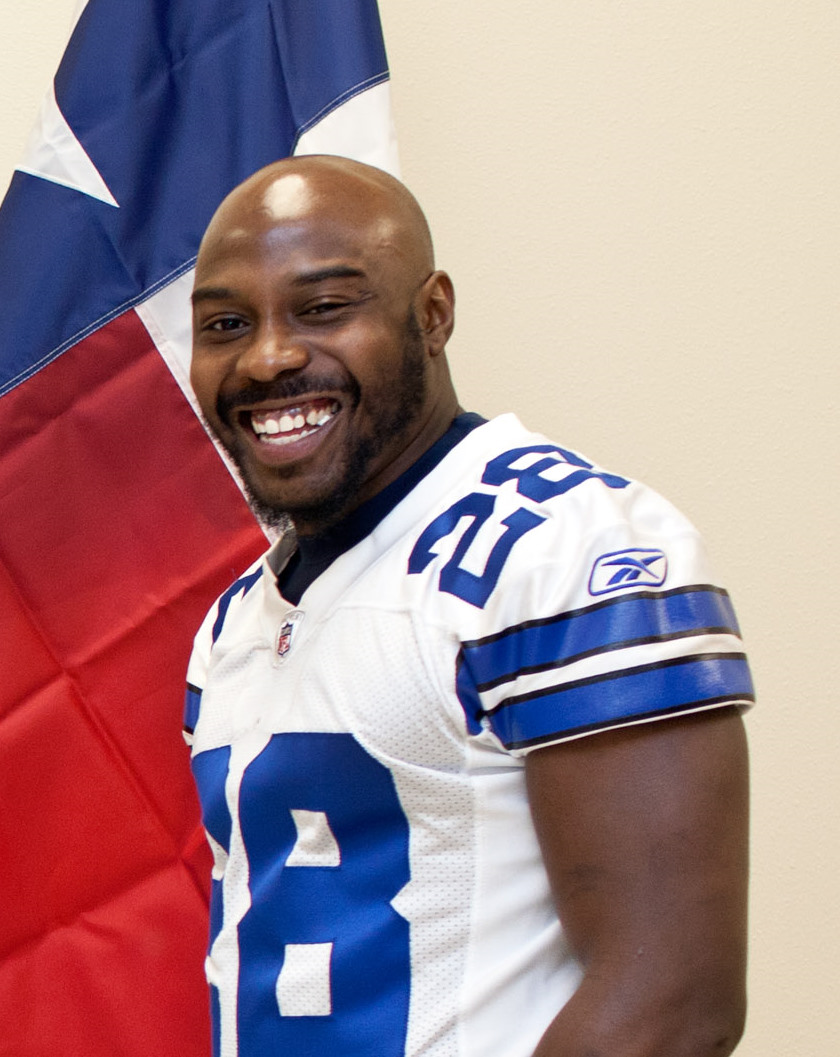
- Jones in 2012

No. 28, 23
- Position: Running back / Kickoff returner

Personal information
- Born: May 8, 1987 (age 39); Tulsa, Oklahoma, U.S.
- Listed height: 5 ft 10 in (1.78 m)
- Listed weight: 215 lb (98 kg)

Career information
- High school: Booker T. Washington (Tulsa)
- College: Arkansas (2005–2007)
- NFL draft: 2008: 1st round, 22nd overall pick

Career history
- Dallas Cowboys (2008–2012); Philadelphia Eagles (2013)*; Pittsburgh Steelers (2013)
- * Offseason or practice squad member only

Awards and highlights
- Consensus All-American (2007); SEC Special Teams Player of the Year (2007); First-team All-SEC (2007); 2× Second-team All-SEC (2005, 2006)

Career NFL statistics
- Rushing yards: 2,912
- Rushing touchdowns: 11
- Receiving yards: 1,129
- Receiving touchdowns: 3
- Return yards: 2,044
- Return touchdowns: 1
- Stats at Pro Football Reference

Felix Jones Jr. (born May 8, 1987) is an American former professional football player who was a running back in the National Football League (NFL) for the Dallas Cowboys and Pittsburgh Steelers. He played college football for the Arkansas Razorbacks, earning consensus All-American honors in 2007. He was selected by the Cowboys in the first round of the 2008 NFL draft.

== Early life ==
Jones was born in Tulsa, Oklahoma. He attended Booker T. Washington High School in Tulsa, where he was a standout in football and track. As a junior, he sustained a broken ankle early in the season, but still managed to rack up 800 yards rushing and 20 touchdowns. He was named the Tulsa World Player of the Year following his senior season, after rushing for 2,282 yards and 48 touchdowns, leading his squad to a 13–1 record and a state runner-up finish.

In track & field, Jones competed as a sprinter and jumper. He recorded a personal-best time of 10.87 seconds in the 100 meters, and was a member of the 4 × 100 m relay (43.30 s). In jumping events, he cleared 1.89 meters in high jump and 6.73 meters in the long jump.

Regarded as a four-star recruit by Rivals.com, he was ranked as the No. 19 athlete in the nation and the No. 4 overall player in the state of Oklahoma. He chose to attend Arkansas over scholarship offers from Tennessee, Oklahoma State and LSU.

== College career ==
Jones attended the University of Arkansas, where he played for the Razorbacks. While serving primarily as the back-up for All-American and two-time Doak Walker Award winner Darren McFadden, Jones was used in a variety of ways alongside McFadden and fullback Peyton Hillis in the Arkansas backfield.

In the Wild Hog formation, Jones was used as a runner, receiver, blocker, or simply a decoy. Jones gained fame for his ability in returning kickoffs, returning four kicks for touchdowns during his college career.

=== 2005 season ===
In his collegiate debut, Jones had eight carries for 137 yards and a touchdown, which was an 80-yarder, against Missouri State. On October 8, against Louisiana-Monroe, he had 14 carries for 102 yards and two touchdowns. On November 19 against Mississippi State, he had a 100-yard kickoff return for a touchdown. Overall, in the 2005 season, Jones had 99 carries for 626 rushing yards and three rushing touchdowns to go along with eight receptions for 100 receiving yards.

=== 2006 season ===
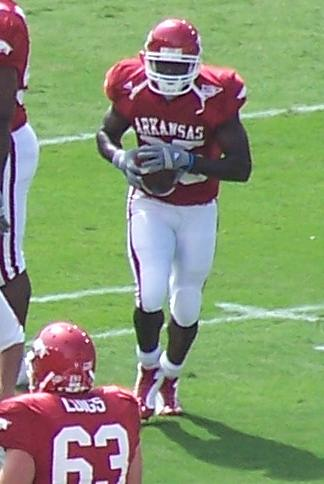
Jones before the Alabama game in 2006.

On October 7 against Auburn, Jones had 13 carries for 104 yards and a touchdown in the victory. In the following game, against Southeast Missouri State, he had five carries for 106 yards and a touchdown in the victory. Two weeks later, against Louisiana-Monroe, he had nine carries for 141 yards and a touchdown in the victory. On November 24, against LSU, he had 16 carries for 137 rushing yards and a touchdown. In the Capital One Bowl, against Wisconsin, he had 14 carries for 150 yards and two touchdowns. In the 2006 season, Jones rushed for 1,168 yards and scored six touchdowns on 154 carries, thus averaging 7.6 yards per carry, leading the SEC. He was an all-American kickoff returner and had one touchdown on a 100-yard kickoff return against Ole Miss, and caught 15 passes for 107 yards and three touchdowns. Jones alongside McFadden and Peyton Hillis, it was the first time in school history that two different running backs rushed for more than 1,000 yards in the same season. Jones was a second-team All-SEC by the conference's coaches, and second-team All-SEC by the media. That team finished 10–4 and won the SEC Western Division title.

=== 2007 season ===
Jones started the 2007 season with 12 carries for 129 rushing yards and a rushing touchdown to go along with a 90-yard kickoff return for a touchdown in the 46–26 victory over Troy in the Razorbacks' first game. Two games later, Jones had 12 carries for 133 rushing yards and an 82-yard kickoff return for a touchdown against Kentucky. In the following game, against North Texas, he had seven carries for 132 rushing yards and two rushing touchdowns in the victory. On October 6, against Chattanooga, he had 13 carries for 141 rushing yards and two rushing touchdowns in the victory. Two weeks later, against Ole Miss, he had 15 carries for 101 rushing yards and two rushing touchdowns in the victory. On November 3, against South Carolina, he had 13 carries for 166 rushing yards and three rushing touchdowns in the victory. Jones finished with 133 carries for 1,162 yards and 11 touchdowns, while averaging 8.7 yards per carry, finishing second in the SEC and nation. In addition, he led the Southeastern Conference in kickoff returns with 18 for 564 yards and two touchdowns, averaging 31.3 yards per return. Jones also had 13 receptions for 111 yards. 2007 marked the second straight year that Jones and McFadden have each eclipsed the 1,000 yards rushing in a season. The 2007 Razorbacks finished 8–4 before losing to Missouri in the January 1, 2008 Cotton Bowl Classic. Jones was named to the first-team All-SEC squad as a kick returner, and the second-team All-SEC as a running back. He was also named an All-American kick returner.

After being hired as the Razorbacks' head coach, Bobby Petrino stated that Jones was his "highest recruiting target" and soon met with Jones to discuss his future with Arkansas. However, Jones decided to forgo his senior season to enter the 2008 NFL draft where numerous publications projected him to be taken in the first or second round.

== Professional career ==
Pre-draft measurables
Height	Weight	Arm length	Hand span	40-yard dash	10-yard split	20-yard split	20-yard shuttle	Three-cone drill	Vertical jump	Broad jump	Bench press
5 ft 10 1/8 in (1.78 m)	207 lb (94 kg)	32 3/8 in (0.82 m)	8 3/8 in (0.21 m)	4.47 s	1.55 s	2.59 s	4.19 s	6.90 s	33.5 in (0.85 m)	10 ft 4 in (3.15 m)	13 reps
All values from NFL Combine/Central Florida Pro Day

=== Dallas Cowboys ===
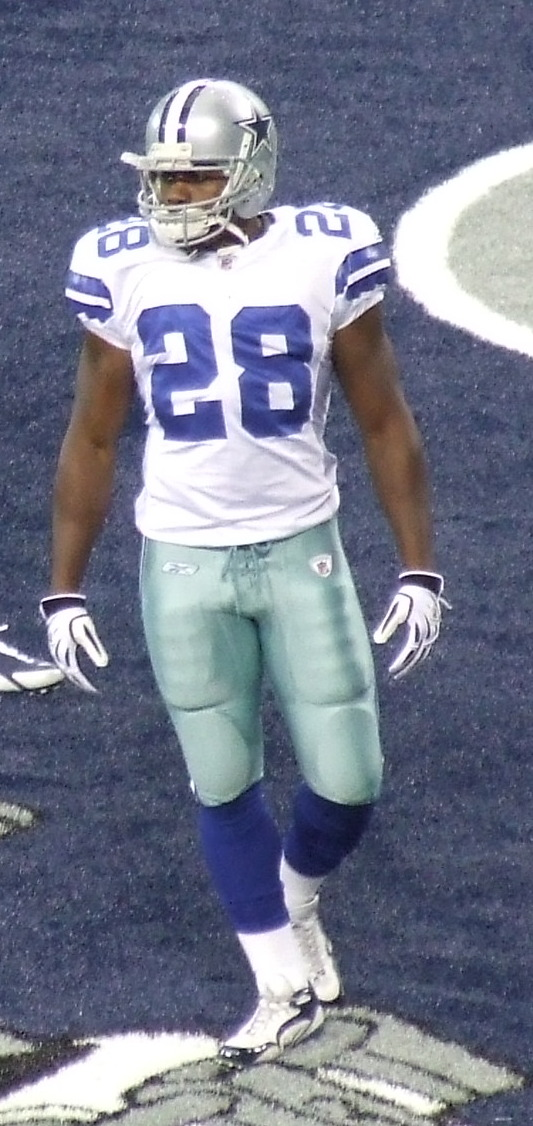
Jones during the 2009 NFL season

Looking to acquire a running back who could complement the bruising style of starter Marion Barber, the Dallas Cowboys selected Jones in the first round of the 2008 NFL draft (22nd overall). The decision process for his selection was captured in the fourth season (2008) of HBO's Hard Knocks series. He signed a professional contract on July 26 for $10.53 million, with $7.67 million guaranteed, including a $3.57 million signing bonus.

The expectations were high in Jones' rookie season; on his first rushing attempt in the NFL Jones ran for an 11-yard touchdown in the third quarter of a 28–10 victory over the Cleveland Browns. On September 15, during a Monday Night Football game versus the Philadelphia Eagles, Jones returned a kickoff 98 yards for a touchdown in the first quarter of a 41–37 win, which earned him NFC Special Teams Player of the Week. In his third professional game, Jones ran for a 60-yard touchdown against the Green Bay Packers on November 21. In Week 6 against the Arizona Cardinals, Jones tore his left hamstring. During his recovery process he also suffered a torn ligament in his left toe and was placed on the injured reserve list on November 20. In Jones' first year, he displayed an explosiveness that was difficult to defend for opposing teams. He finished with 30 carries for 266 rushing yards for an 8.87 yards-per-carry average and three rushing touchdowns.

In his second season, Jones received more carries per game and against the New York Giants he rushed seven times for 96 yards and a touchdown. After never rushing for more than nine carries in a professional game, Jones reached the double digit mark against the Carolina Panthers, where he also had his first career start in place of an injured Barber, recording eight carries for 94 yards (11.8) and one reception for 20 yards, but also suffered a sprained PCL in his left knee during the third quarter that ended his day and would make him miss two additional games. Jones returned to action against the Atlanta Falcons, where he also started but was ineffective, registering eight carries for 37 yards and two receptions for six yards. Jones began to average over 10 carries per game after the week 13 game against the New York Giants. Against the Eagles, Jones rushed 15 times for 91 yards with a touchdown. In the regular season, Jones set a Cowboys franchise record in average yards per carry with 5.9 yards, the tenth most since the AFL-NFL merger. He finished the year taking the main running back role over Barber and recording 569 total yards in his last six games, while averaging 6.2 yards per touch.

In the first Cowboys playoff win since 1996, playing against the Eagles in the NFC Wild Card Round, Jones led the team with 16 carries for 148 yards (including a 73-yard touchdown run) and a 30-yard reception. His 148 yards are the third-most rushing yards in a playoff game in team history and his 73-yard run is the longest in franchise postseason history. Jones also became the first NFL player with 400 rushing yards on fewer than 50 career carries since Bo Jackson did it in 1987.

In 2010, Jones bulked up to 225 pounds in order to improve his durability and was officially moved to the top of the depth chart at running back. He rushed for 109 yards on 15 carries against the Tennessee Titans, for his first 100-yard game. He played in all 16 games for the first time in his career, starting seven games together or in place of Barber and leading the team with 800 rush yards on 185 carries (4.3 yards average) and a touchdown. Against the New York Giants he had the longest reception in his career (71 yards).

In 2011 after Barber was released by the Cowboys, the expectation was that Jones would be the primary running back. He also slimmed down into the 210–215 pound range, in order to regain some of the explosiveness he lost in the previous year. After suffering a left high ankle sprain in the fifth game of the season against the New England Patriots, the four games he missed gave rookie DeMarco Murray the opportunity to earn the starter position. Against the New York Giants, Murray was lost for the year when he broke his ankle in the first quarter, giving Jones a chance to rush for 106 yards and have six receptions for 31 yards. He rushed for 108 yards on 22 carries, and added three receptions for 23 yards against the Tampa Bay Buccaneers. He finished the year with 585 rushing yards on 127 carries (4.6 average) and 33 receptions for 221 yards.

Jones missed the entire 2012 offseason workouts because of shoulder surgery and failed the conditioning test at the start of training camp. Used in a change-of-pace back role, Jones' best game came against the eventual Super Bowl champion Baltimore Ravens, when he replaced an injured Murray and finished with 18 carries for 92 yards and one touchdown in the 31–29 loss. After playing in all 16 games and having seven starts, he battled through knee injuries to finish with 664 yards from scrimmage, five total touchdowns, and a career-worst 3.5 yards average per carry. The Cowboys decided not to re-sign Jones after the season, making him a free agent.

=== Philadelphia Eagles ===
On May 14, 2013, Jones signed a one-year contract with the Philadelphia Eagles who were looking for him to backup LeSean McCoy and Bryce Brown. After being passed on the depth chart by Chris Polk, he was traded to the Pittsburgh Steelers in exchange for linebacker Adrian Robinson on August 23.

=== Pittsburgh Steelers ===
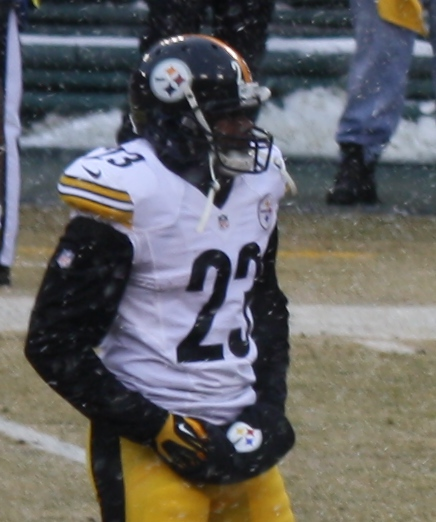
Jones with the Steelers in 2013

The Pittsburgh Steelers acquired Jones for depth purposes, while rookie Le'Veon Bell was recovering from a mid-foot sprain. He was named the starting back in week 2 against the Cincinnati Bengals, rushing for 37 yards on ten carries. Jones lost the starter role the next week against the Chicago Bears, where he had seven carries for 34 yards and was benched after a costly third quarter fumble. He finished the 2013 season with 48 carries for 184 rushing yards and nine receptions for 63 receiving yards in 16 games and two starts. He was not re-signed at the end of the year.

=== 2015 NFL Veteran Combine ===
After being out of football for a year, Jones participated in the first NFL Veteran Combine.

== Career statistics ==
=== NFL ===
==== Regular season ====
Year	Team	Games		Rushing					Receiving					Fumbles	
Year	Team	GP	GS	Att	Yds	Avg	Lng	TD	Rec	Yds	Avg	Lng	TD	Fum	Lost
2008	DAL	6	0	30	266	8.9	60T	3	2	10	5.0	7	0	0	0
2009	DAL	14	1	116	685	5.9	56	3	19	119	6.4	30	0	3	2
2010	DAL	16	7	185	800	4.3	34	1	48	450	9.4	71T	1	2	1
2011	DAL	12	8	127	575	4.5	40	1	33	221	6.7	27	0	5	2
2012	DAL	16	7	111	402	3.6	22T	3	25	262	10.5	39	2	2	2
2013	PIT	16	2	48	184	3.8	14	0	9	63	7.0	15	0	1	1
Career		80	25	617	2,912	4.7	60	11	136	1,125	8.3	71	3	13	8

==== Postseason ====
Year	Team	Games		Rushing					Receiving					Fumbles	
Year	Team	GP	GS	Att	Yds	Avg	Lng	TD	Rec	Yds	Avg	Lng	TD	Fum	Lost
2009	DAL	2	0	30	217	7.2	73	1	4	52	13.0	30	0	0	0
Career		2	0	30	217	7.2	73	1	4	52	13.0	30	0	0	0

=== College ===
Season	Team	GP	Rushing					Receiving					Kickoff returns				
Season	Team	GP	Att	Yds	Avg	Lng	TD	Rec	Yds	Avg	Lng	TD	Ret	Yds	Avg	Lng	TD
2005	Arkansas	11	99	626	6.3	80	3	8	100	12.5	23	0	17	543	31.6	100	1
2006	Arkansas	14	154	1,168	7.6	85	6	15	107	7.1	29	3	23	554	24.1	100	1
2007	Arkansas	13	134	1,160	8.7	73	11	16	176	11.0	40	0	24	647	27.0	90	2
Career		38	387	2,954	7.6	85	20	39	383	9.8	40	3	64	1,744	27.3	100	4
