= Bill Rentmeester =

American football player (born 1986)

Profile
- Position: Fullback

Personal information
- Born: April 25, 1986 (age 40); Beaver Dam, Wisconsin, U.S.
- Listed height: 6 ft 0 in (1.83 m)
- Listed weight: 254 lb (115 kg)

Career information
- College: Wisconsin
- NFL draft: 2009: undrafted

Career history
- San Diego Chargers (2009)*; San Francisco 49ers (2009)*; Las Vegas Locomotives (2009)*
- * Offseason or practice squad member only

Bill Rentmeester (born April 25, 1986) is an American former football fullback. He was signed by the San Diego Chargers as an undrafted free agent in 2009. He played college football at Wisconsin and high school football at Beaver Dam High School.

Rentmeester was also a member of the San Francisco 49ers and Las Vegas Locomotives.

== College career ==
Although Rentmeester's primary duty was to block for former Wisconsin Badgers running back P.J. Hill, Rentmeester was able to total 116 Rushing yards and 1 Touchdown in his career. He wore number 34.

== Professional career ==
=== San Diego Chargers ===
After going unselected in the 2009 NFL draft, Rentmeester was signed by the San Diego Chargers as an undrafted free agent. He was waived on August 6.

=== San Francisco 49ers ===
Rentmeester signed with the San Francisco 49ers on August 16, 2009 after the team waived injured running back Thomas Clayton. He was released on September 5, as the team had to have its final roster set.
