= P. J. Hill =

American football player (born 1987)

Profile
- Position: Running back

Personal information
- Born: January 3, 1987 (age 39); East Elmhurst, New York, U.S.
- Listed height: 5 ft 10 in (1.78 m)
- Listed weight: 218 lb (99 kg)

Career information
- High school: Poly Prep (NY)
- College: Wisconsin
- NFL draft: 2009: undrafted

Career history
- New Orleans Saints (2009)*; Philadelphia Eagles (2009); Washington Redskins (2009); New Orleans Saints (2010)
- * Offseason or practice squad member only

Awards and highlights
- Big Ten Freshman of the Year (2006); First-team All-Big Ten (2006)
- Stats at Pro Football Reference

Parrish "P. J." Hill Jr. (born January 3, 1987) is an American former professional football player who was a running back in the National Football League (NFL). He played college football for the Wisconsin Badgers. Hill was a member of the NFL's New Orleans Saints, Philadelphia Eagles and Washington Redskins.

== College career ==
After graduating from Poly Prep Country Day School in Brooklyn, New York in 2005, Hill attended the University of Wisconsin–Madison. Hill is one of just three players in Badgers history to have rushed for 1,000 yards in each of their first three seasons. He is one of two players to score at least ten rushing touchdowns in their first three years.

Hill ranks sixth on the school's career rushing yardage list with 3,942 yards, and is tied for sixth on Wisconsin's career rushing touchdowns list with 42. His 44 total touchdowns (42 rushing and two receiving) place him sixth in school history. He is fourth on the school's list for career rushing attempts with 770. He averaged 5.1 yards per carry during his 36-game career (tied for tenth all-time at Wisconsin). He rushed for at least 100 yards in a game 20 times (fifth-most in school history).

=== Statistics ===
		Rushing				Receiving			
Year	Team	Attempts	Yards	Average	TDs	Receptions	Yds	Average	TDs
2006	Wisconsin	311	1,569	5.0	15	18	197	10.9	1
2007	Wisconsin	233	1,212	5.2	14	14	89	6.4	1
2008	Wisconsin	226	1,161	5.1	13	7	72	10.3	0
College totals		770	3,942	5.1	42	39	358	9.2	2

== Professional career ==
Pre-draft measurables
Height	Weight	Arm length	Hand span	40-yard dash	10-yard split	20-yard split	20-yard shuttle	Three-cone drill	Vertical jump	Broad jump	Bench press
5 ft 10 1/4 in (1.78 m)	222 lb (101 kg)	32 1/2 in (0.83 m)	9 1/4 in (0.23 m)	4.63 s	1.59 s	2.67 s	4.24 s	7.09 s	37.0 in (0.94 m)	10 ft 2 in (3.10 m)	16 reps
All values from NFL Combine/Pro Day

=== New Orleans Saints (first stint) ===
On April 27, 2009, a day after being undrafted in the 2009 NFL draft, Hill signed a 3-year contract with the New Orleans Saints. He ran for 128 yards on 26 carries with 3 touchdowns and had 2 catches for 9 yards in the 2009 preseason. He was waived by the Saints on September 5, 2009, and then re-signed to their practice squad the following day.

=== Philadelphia Eagles ===
Hill was signed off the Saints practice squad by the Philadelphia Eagles on October 28, 2009. He was waived on December 14 and subsequently re-signed to the Eagles' practice squad on December 16.

=== Washington Redskins ===
Hill was signed off the Eagles' practice squad by the Washington Redskins on December 30, 2009.

He was waived on May 3, 2010.

=== New Orleans Saints (second stint) ===
Hill was claimed off waivers by the New Orleans Saints on May 4, 2010. He suffered a torn triceps in a preseason exhibition game on August 21, 2010, and after clearing waivers he was placed on injured reserve.

He was waived on February 10, 2011.
