= Roderick Rogers =

American football player (born 1984)

No. 43
- Position: Safety / Cornerback

Personal information
- Born: September 7, 1984 (age 42); Stone Mountain, Georgia, U.S.
- Listed height: 6 ft 2 in (1.88 m)
- Listed weight: 187 lb (85 kg)

Career information
- High school: Stephenson (Stone Mountain)
- College: Wisconsin
- NFL draft: 2007: undrafted

Career history
- Denver Broncos (2007–2008); Minnesota Vikings (2008–2009)*; New England Patriots (2009)*
- * Offseason or practice squad member only

Awards and highlights
- 2× Second-team All-Big Ten (2005, 2006)

Career NFL statistics
- Total tackles: 7
- Stats at Pro Football Reference

Roderick Rogers (born September 7, 1984) is an American former professional football player who was a defensive back in the National Football League (NFL). He was signed by the Denver Broncos as an undrafted free agent in 2007. He played college football for the Wisconsin Badgers.

Rogers sas also a member of the Minnesota Vikings and New England Patriots.

== Early life ==
Rogers attended Stephenson High School in Stone Mountain, Georgia, where he lettered in wrestling, track and field, and football as a safety. He finished his high school career with 261 tackles and 13 interceptions.

== College career ==
After graduating from high school, Rogers attended the University of Wisconsin–Madison. As a junior, Rogers was a 13-game starter at safety, finishing the year with 56 tackles and three interceptions. As a senior in 2006, Rogers was on watch lists for the Lott Trophy and started all 13 games, earning second-team All-Big Ten Conference honors for the second straight season.

== Professional career ==
=== Denver Broncos ===
After going undrafted in the 2007 NFL draft, Rogers was signed by the Denver Broncos on May 2, 2007. He did not make the team's roster out of training camp but spent the first 14 games of the season on the Broncos' practice squad. He was elevated to the 53-man roster for the final two games of the season. Rogers also began the 2008 season on the Broncos' practice squad before being promoted to the active roster on November 4. The Broncos waived Rogers on November 25 after his first career start against the Oakland Raiders.

=== Minnesota Vikings ===
Rogers was signed to the practice squad of the Minnesota Vikings on December 3, 2008. After finishing the season on the practice squad, he was re-signed to a future contract on January 5, 2009. He converted to wide receiver for the Vikings during the spring. Despite the position change, Rogers was waived by the Vikings on June 1, 2009.

=== New England Patriots ===
Rogers was signed by the New England Patriots on August 18, 2009. He was waived on September 4, 2009.
