= Ken DeBauche =

American football player (born 1984)

Profile
- Position: Punter

Personal information
- Born: September 26, 1984 (age 42)
- Listed height: 6 ft 2 in (1.88 m)
- Listed weight: 217 lb (98 kg)

Career information
- High school: Suamico (WI) Bay Port
- College: Wisconsin
- NFL draft: 2008: undrafted

Career history
- Green Bay Packers (2008)*
- * Offseason or practice squad member only

Awards and highlights
- Wisconsin Special Teams Player of the Year (2004); Second-team All-American (2005); Freshman All-American (2004); First-team All-Big Ten (2005); Second-team All-Big Ten (2007); Wisconsin Team Captain (2007)

Ken DeBauche (born September 26, 1984) from Suamico, Wisconsin is an American former football punter. Ken signed with the Green Bay Packers as an undrafted free agent in April 2008 and subsequently released on July 24, 2008. He played college football at Wisconsin as #94 and was a team captain for the Badgers in his senior season.

Ken attended Green Bay area high school Bay Port High School, in Suamico. Ken was a three-sport athlete playing football, basketball, and baseball during his high school career. His younger brother, Brad DeBauche, was also a punter for the Badgers from 2007 to 2009.

== Early life ==
DeBauche was a 3-sport (football, basketball, baseball) athlete at Bay Port High School in Suamico, Wisconsin.

== College career ==
DeBauche holds the University of Wisconsin single season punting record at 44.8 yards per punt and is also second in career average behind Kevin Stemke.

Ken was voted as the Badgers Special Teams player of the year as a freshman in 2004 and was voted Big Ten Special Teams player of the Week numerous times throughout his career.

DeBauche was a 3-time All-Big Ten performer and second-team All-American in 2005.

"Taylor Mehlhaff teamed with punter Ken DeBauche to form what many experts felt was the best kicking tandem in college football in recent years." -NFLDraftScout.com
