= 2007 Capital One Bowl =

American college football game

Arkansas Razorbacks	Wisconsin Badgers
(10–3)	(11–1)
SEC	Big Ten
14	17
Head coach: Houston Nutt	Head coach: Bret Bielema
AP / Coaches / BCS; 12 / 13 / 12	AP / Coaches / BCS; 6 / 5 / 7
	1	2	3	4	Total
Arkansas	7	0	0	7	14
Wisconsin	10	7	0	0	17
- Date: January 1, 2007
- Season: 2006
- Stadium: Florida Citrus Bowl
- Location: Orlando, Florida
- MVP: John Stocco (Wisconsin QB)
- Referee: Dennis Hennigan (Big East)
- Attendance: 60,774

United States TV coverage
- Network: ABC
- Announcers: Brad Nessler, Bob Griese, Paul Maguire and Erin Andrews

The 2007 Capital One Bowl was held on January 1, 2007, at the Citrus Bowl in Orlando, Florida. The game featured the Badgers of the University of Wisconsin–Madison, who finished the season tied for second in the Big Ten Conference, and the Razorbacks of the University of Arkansas, who finished the season first in the Southeastern Conference's West Division.

== Overview ==
The Badgers used 206 yards and two touchdown passes from John Stocco to win 17–14 over Arkansas.
