= Jack Ikegwuonu =

American football player (born 1986)

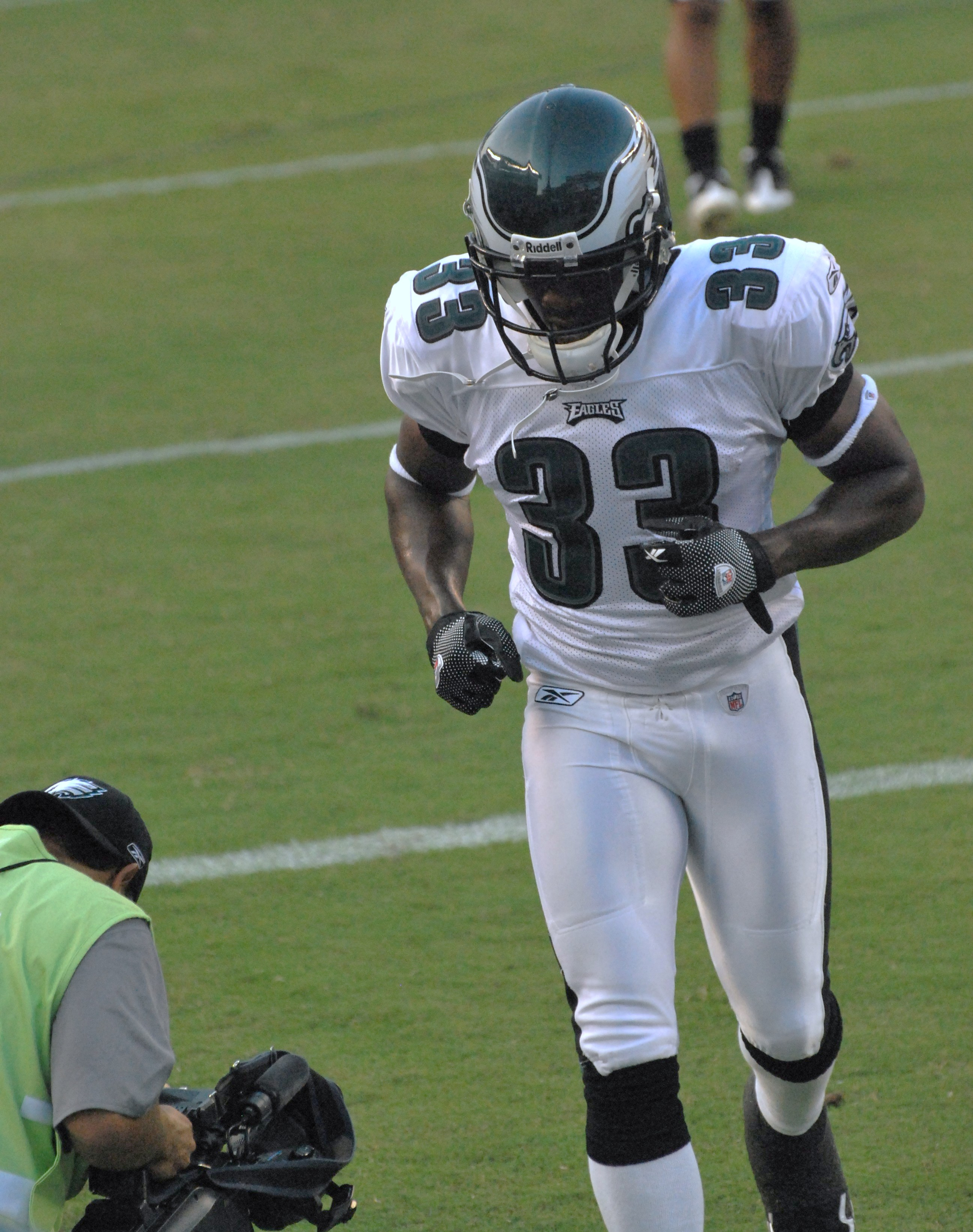
- Ikegwuonu with the Philadelphia Eagles in 2009

No. 33
- Position: Cornerback

Personal information
- Born: January 7, 1986 (age 40); Madison, Wisconsin, U.S.
- Listed height: 5 ft 11 in (1.80 m)
- Listed weight: 200 lb (91 kg)

Career information
- High school: Madison Memorial
- College: Wisconsin
- NFL draft: 2008: 4th round, 131st overall pick

Career history
- Philadelphia Eagles (2008—2009)

Awards and highlights
- 2× First-team All-Big Ten (2006, 2007); ESPN All-Bowl Team (2006)
- Stats at Pro Football Reference

Jack Ikegwuonu (born January 7, 1986) is an American former professional football player who was a cornerback for the Philadelphia Eagles of the National Football League (NFL). He was selected by the Eagles in the fourth round of the 2008 NFL draft. He played college football for the Wisconsin Badgers.

== Early life ==
Ikegwuonou was born in Jackson, Mississippi, to medical professionals, Patty and Fidelis Ikegwuonu, and raised in Madison, Wisconsin. He attended and played football at James Madison Memorial High School. Ikegwuonu earned first-team all-state honors as a split end and defensive back, All-Midwest Region honors, and All-Area accolades. He was named the Big Eight Conference Wide Receiver of the Year, Big Eight Conference Defensive Back of the Year, and team MVP twice. In addition to football and basketball, Ikegwuonu played center field for his school's baseball team.

== College career ==
=== 2005 season ===
Ikegwuonu garnered a Freshman All-American honorable mention by The Sporting News. He shared left cornerback duties starting at that position against Illinois, Penn State and Auburn adding another starting assignment at nickel back against Hawaii. Wearing jersey #27, Jack Ikegwuonu recorded 23 solo out of 26 tackles with two stops for a total of 6 yards in losses. He was responsible for deflecting 3 passes and intercepted 3 others for 63 yards in returns and one touchdown.

=== 2006 season ===
Ikegwuonu was selected as an All-Big Ten Conference first-team choice by the league's coaches and media, adding second-team honors from the media. Although he was suspended briefly after his December arrest, he was allowed to play in the Citrus Bowl. He started all 13 games at right cornerback, switching to jersey #6 from #27 and recording 38 solo out of 41 tackles with 3.5 stops for a total of 14 yards in losses, caused a fumble and recovered another for a 50-yard touchdown return. He was responsible for deflecting 11 passes and intercepted two passes for 28 return yards.

=== 2007 season ===
Ikegwuonu was selected as an All-Big Ten Conference first-team choice by the league's coaches and media. He started all 13 games at right cornerback, recording 19 solo out 24 tackles with a league-high fifteen pass deflections and one interception for a 2-yard loss. He saw his main pass coverage assignments catch 38 passes for an average of 15.76 yards and five touchdowns.

Ikegwuonu elected to forgo his senior college season to enter the 2008 NFL draft, but he injured his knee in January 2008 while preparing for the NFL Scouting Combine.

=== College statistics ===
Year	Team	Total tackles	Solo tackles	Assists	Forced fumbles	Interceptions	Yards	Fumble TD	Interception TD	AGAINST
2005	WISC	26	23	3	0	3	63	1	0	Purdue
2006	WISC	41	35	6	1	2	28	0	1	Minnesota
2007	WISC	24	19	5	0	1	-2	0	0	

== Professional career ==
Ikegwuonu was selected by the Philadelphia Eagles in the fourth round (131st overall) of the 2008 NFL draft after being projected as high as a first-round draft pick. He missed the entire 2008 season because of a knee injury during the 2008 NFL Combine and on July 22 was placed on the Physically-Unable-to-Perform list.

He was waived on September 5, 2009. He was re-signed to the team's practice squad on September 7, 2009. After cornerback Joselio Hanson was suspended for four games for failing a drug test before the start of the 2008 NFC Championship game, Ikegwuonu was promoted to the active roster. He played in his first regular season game in the NFL on November 22, 2009 against the Chicago Bears. He was waived on November 24 after the team signed Geoffrey Pope off the Cincinnati Bengals practice squad.

== Personal life ==
Ikegwuonu was charged with residential burglary and criminal trespass in DeKalb, Illinois, on November 26, 2006. He was found not guilty on all charges.

In November 2014, Ikegwuonu and his twin brother were arrested in Madison, Wisconsin, for allegedly committing five armed robberies. Police said money from the robberies was primarily used to purchase heroin. In March 2015, Ikegwuonu and his brother pleaded guilty. Ikegwuonu was sentenced to 9.5 years in prison.
