= Luke Swan =

American football player and coach (born 1984)

Biographical details
- Born: September 5, 1984 (age 42); Fennimore, Wisconsin, U.S.

Playing career
- 2004-2007: Wisconsin
- Position: Wide receiver

Coaching career (HC unless noted)
- 2011–2014: Wisconsin (graduate assistant)

Luke Swan (born September 5, 1984) is an American former football wide receiver and college football coach. He was signed by the Kansas City Chiefs as an undrafted free agent in 2008. He played college football for the Wisconsin Badgers. He was also a cast member on Spike TV's Fourth and Long.

== Early years ==
Swan attended Fennimore High School, where he participated in football, basketball, baseball, and track. Swan started out as an option quarterback in his freshman season but switched to wide receiver his sophomore season.

As a senior, Swan captained both his football and basketball teams. He finished his high school career with 121 receptions, for 2,234 yards and 26 touchdowns, along with 18 interceptions as a defensive back. Swan was a two-time All-State, All-Conference, and All-Area selection. He was also a two-time All-Conference basketball selection, two-time conference long jump champion, and won titles in the 100-meter dash, 300 intermediate hurdles, and 200-meter dash.

Swan graduated from Fennimore High School in 2003 and enrolled at the University of Wisconsin-Madison, walking on the football team. He graduated with a bachelor's degree in kinesiology in December 2007.

== College career ==
Swan walked onto the football team in 2004 and was redshirted for his freshman year after appearing in one game. As a sophomore, he appeared in eight games as a reserve receiver, earning a varsity letter. He received a football scholarship his junior year, and he was named Academic All-Big Ten.

In 2006, Swan appeared in all 13 games, making 10 starts at receiver. He finished the year as the team's third leading receiver with 35 receptions for 595 yards (17.0-yard average) and 5 touchdowns. He was named ESPN The Magazine Academic All-District 5 Team, Academic All-Big Ten, and won University of Wisconsin's Ivan B. Williamson Scholastic Award.

In 2007, as a senior, Swan was selected team captain by his teammates. For the year, he started 6 games at receiver and had 25 receptions for 451 yards (18.0-yard average) and 2 touchdowns. Swan's season was cut short after he sustained a hamstring injury at Illinois after making four receptions for 67 yards. He was the team's second leading receiver for the season.

== Professional career ==
=== Pre-draft ===
Pre-draft measurables
Height	Weight	40-yard dash	10-yard split	20-yard split	20-yard shuttle	Three-cone drill	Vertical jump	Broad jump	Bench press	Wonderlic
5 ft 11 in (1.80 m)	189 lb (86 kg)	x s	x s	x s	3.91 s	6.54 s	38.5 in (0.98 m)	10 ft 9.5 in (3.29 m)	15 reps	x
Values from Wisconsin Pro Day

=== Kansas City Chiefs ===
Swan was signed as an undrafted free agent on May 2, 2008, by the Kansas City Chiefs. On June 10, 2008, Swan was placed on waivers.

=== Fourth and Long ===
Swan was selected as a part of the twelve-man cast for Michael Irvin's football reality show Fourth and Long; the winner received an invitation to attend the Dallas Cowboys training camp and a shot at making their roster. Swan was eliminated fourth in the competition because of nagging injuries.

== Coaching career ==
A year and a half after competing for an NFL spot, Swan was signed to coach by his former head coach at Wisconsin, Bret Bielema.
