= Jonathan Casillas =

American football player (born 1987)

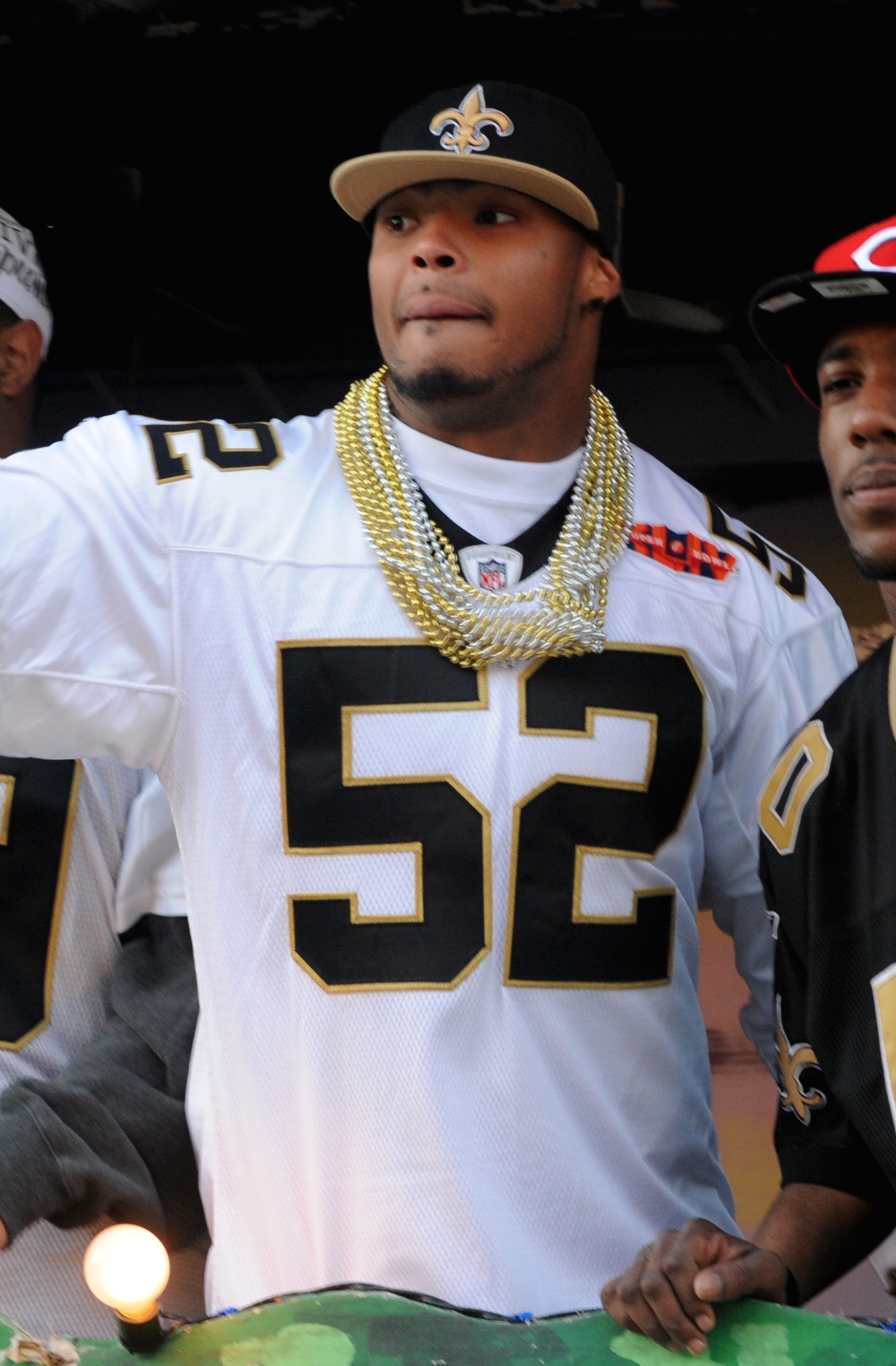
- Casillas at the 2010 Super Bowl parade in New Orleans

No. 52, 54
- Position: Linebacker

Personal information
- Born: June 3, 1987 (age 39); Jersey City, New Jersey, U.S.
- Listed height: 6 ft 0 in (1.83 m)
- Listed weight: 225 lb (102 kg)

Career information
- High school: New Brunswick (NJ)
- College: Wisconsin (2005–2008)
- NFL draft: 2009: undrafted

Career history
- New Orleans Saints (2009–2012); Tampa Bay Buccaneers (2013–2014); New England Patriots (2014); New York Giants (2015–2017)

Awards and highlights
- 2× Super Bowl champion (XLIV, XLIX)

Career NFL statistics
- Total tackles: 385
- Sacks: 6.5
- Forced fumbles: 3
- Fumble recoveries: 2
- Interceptions: 1
- Stats at Pro Football Reference

Jonathan Casillas (born June 3, 1987) is an American former professional football player who was a linebacker in the National Football League (NFL). He played high school football at New Brunswick High School and college football for the Wisconsin Badgers. He is of Puerto Rican and African-American ancestry.

== College career ==
Casillas played college football at the University of Wisconsin–Madison.

== Professional career ==
Pre-draft measurables
Height	Weight	40-yard dash	Bench press
6 ft 1 in (1.85 m)	238 lb (108 kg)	4.50 s	24 reps
All values from NFL Combine

=== New Orleans Saints ===
He went undrafted in the 2009 NFL draft, but was later signed as a free agent. Casillas was coming off surgery from a knee injury and was only a participant in the bench press at the NFL Combine.

In Super Bowl XLIV, he was officially credited with recovering the Saints's third-quarter onside kick to start the second half en route to their 31–17 victory over the Indianapolis Colts.

Casillas was expected to take over as the Saints' starting weakside linebacker for the 2010 season. However, he suffered a foot injury during the last game of the preseason, and he was placed on the injured reserve list, ending his 2010 season.

=== Tampa Bay Buccaneers ===
Casillas signed with the Tampa Bay Buccaneers on March 13, 2013. He played in 12 games before being placed on injured reserve after suffering a knee injury. On March 7, 2014, Casillas re-signed with the Tampa Bay Buccaneers on a one-year deal.

=== New England Patriots ===
Casillas, along with a 2015 sixth-round draft pick, was traded to the New England Patriots on October 28, 2014, for the Patriots' 2015 fifth-round draft pick. On February 1, 2015, he won his second Super Bowl ring when the Patriots defeated the Seattle Seahawks, 28–24, in Super Bowl XLIX.

=== New York Giants ===
On March 10, 2015, Casillas signed a three-year, $10.5 million contract with the New York Giants. Signed as a special teamer, Casillas emerged as a starter for the Giants midway through the 2015 season.

In 2016, Casillas played in all 16 games with 15 starts, recording a career-high 96 tackles.

In 2017, Casillas started eight games before being placed on injured reserve on December 6, 2017 after battling wrist and neck injuries.

== NFL career statistics ==
Legend
**Bold**	Career high

=== Regular season ===
Year	Team	Games		Tackles					Interceptions					Fumbles			
Year	Team	GP	GS	Cmb	Solo	Ast	Sck	TFL	Int	Yds	TD	Lng	PD	FF	FR	Yds	TD
2009	NOR	11	2	20	11	9	0.0	1	0	0	0	0	0	0	0	0	0
2011	NOR	13	5	43	30	13	**3.0**	3	0	0	0	0	2	0	0	0	0
2012	NOR	14	1	31	21	10	0.0	1	0	0	0	0	1	0	**2**	0	0
2013	TAM	12	4	35	23	12	0.0	1	0	0	0	0	2	**1**	0	0	0
2014	TAM	5	3	9	5	4	0.0	1	0	0	0	0	0	0	0	0	0
2014	NWE	8	3	28	19	9	0.0	1	0	0	0	0	0	**1**	0	0	0
2015	NYG	15	7	88	**67**	21	2.0	**5**	**1**	0	0	0	5	0	0	0	0
2016	NYG	**16**	**15**	**96**	62	**34**	1.5	**5**	0	0	0	0	**8**	**1**	0	0	0
2017	NYG	8	8	35	25	10	0.0	3	0	0	0	0	1	0	0	0	0
		102	48	385	263	122	6.5	21	1	0	0	0	19	3	2	0	0

=== Playoffs ===
Year	Team	Games		Tackles					Interceptions					Fumbles			
Year	Team	GP	GS	Cmb	Solo	Ast	Sck	TFL	Int	Yds	TD	Lng	PD	FF	FR	Yds	TD
2009	NOR	**3**	0	2	0	2	0.0	0	0	0	0	0	0	0	0	0	0
2011	NOR	1	0	1	1	0	0.0	0	0	0	0	0	0	0	0	0	0
2014	NWE	**3**	0	3	2	1	0.0	0	0	0	0	0	0	0	0	0	0
2016	NYG	1	**1**	**11**	**7**	**4**	0.0	0	0	0	0	0	0	0	0	0	0
		8	1	17	10	7	0.0	0	0	0	0	0	0	0	0	0	0
