= Mike Newkirk =

American gridiron football player (born 1986)

No. 95
- Position: Defensive end / linebacker

Personal information
- Born: August 12, 1986 (age 40); Ladysmith, Wisconsin, U.S.
- Listed height: 6 ft 3 in (1.91 m)
- Listed weight: 285 lb (129 kg)

Career information
- High school: Ladysmith-Hawkins
- College: Wisconsin
- NFL draft: 2009: undrafted

Career history
- St. Louis Rams (2009)*; Edmonton Eskimos (2009)*; Chicago Rush (2010–2011)
- * Offseason or practice squad member only

Awards and highlights
- Second-team All-Big Ten (2008)

Mike Newkirk (born August 12, 1986) is a former professional American and Canadian football Defensive end / defensive tackle. Newkirk also played DE/LB for the Chicago Rush of the Arena Football League (AFL). He was signed by the St. Louis Rams as an undrafted free agent in 2009. He played college football for the Wisconsin Badgers.

Newkirk has also been a member of the Edmonton Eskimos of the Canadian Football team.

== College career ==
Newkirk was part of the defensive line rotation in both 2005 and 2006. He became a starter in 2007 as a defensive end and the following season, 2008, he was moved to defensive tackle and he was voted Second-team All-Big Ten coming up with four sacks and nine tackles for loss. He ended his career with 10 sacks and 208 tackles, with 29 of those going for a loss.

=== Pre-draft measurables ===
Pre-draft measurables
| Height | Weight | 40-yard dash | 10-yard split | 20-yard split | Three-cone drill | Vertical jump | Broad jump | Bench press |
|---|---|---|---|---|---|---|---|---|
| 6 ft 2 7/8 in (1.90 m) | 355 lb (161 kg) | 8.33 s | 3.03 s | 6.11 s | 13.42 s | Unmeasurable | 3 ft 6 in (1.07 m) | 58 reps |
Height, weight, and bench from NFL Combine, all others from Wisconsin Pro Day.

=== St. Louis Rams ===
On April 27, 2009, he was signed as an undrafted free agent by the St. Louis Rams. Newkirk was waived by the Rams on May 14, 2009.

=== Edmonton Eskimos ===
Newkirk was signed to the Edmonton Eskimos practice roster on July 12, 2009. He was released on September 1.

=== Chicago Rush ===
Newkirk was assigned to the Chicago Rush on April 5, 2010. He later left the team.
