= Paul Hubbard (wide receiver) =

American football player (born 1985)

No. 17
- Position: Wide receiver

Personal information
- Born: June 12, 1985 (age 41); Colorado Springs, Colorado, U.S.
- Listed height: 6 ft 3 in (1.91 m)
- Listed weight: 214 lb (97 kg)

Career information
- High school: Widefield (CO)
- College: Wisconsin
- NFL draft: 2008: 6th round, 191st overall pick

Career history
- Cleveland Browns (2008); Oakland Raiders (2009–2010)*; Buffalo Bills (2010); Winnipeg Blue Bombers (2012)
- * Offseason or practice squad member only

Career NFL statistics
- Receptions: 1
- Receiving yards: 8
- Stats at Pro Football Reference

Paul Hubbard Jr. (born June 12, 1985) is an American former professional football player who was a wide receiver in the National Football League (NFL). He played college football for the Wisconsin Badgers. He was selected by the Cleveland Browns in the sixth round of the 2008 NFL draft.

Hubbard was also a member of the Oakland Raiders, Buffalo Bills, and Winnipeg Blue Bombers.

== Early life ==
Hubbard played high school football at Widefield High School in Colorado Springs. At Widefield High School, he played with Vincent Jackson of the Tampa Bay Buccaneers.

== Professional career ==
=== Buffalo Bills ===
Hubbard was signed to the Buffalo Bills practice squad on September 6, 2010. He was released by the team on August 28, 2011.

=== Winnipeg Blue Bombers ===
Hubbard signed with the Winnipeg Blue Bombers of the Canadian Football League (CFL) on May 24, 2012.
