= Travis Beckum =

American football player (born 1987)

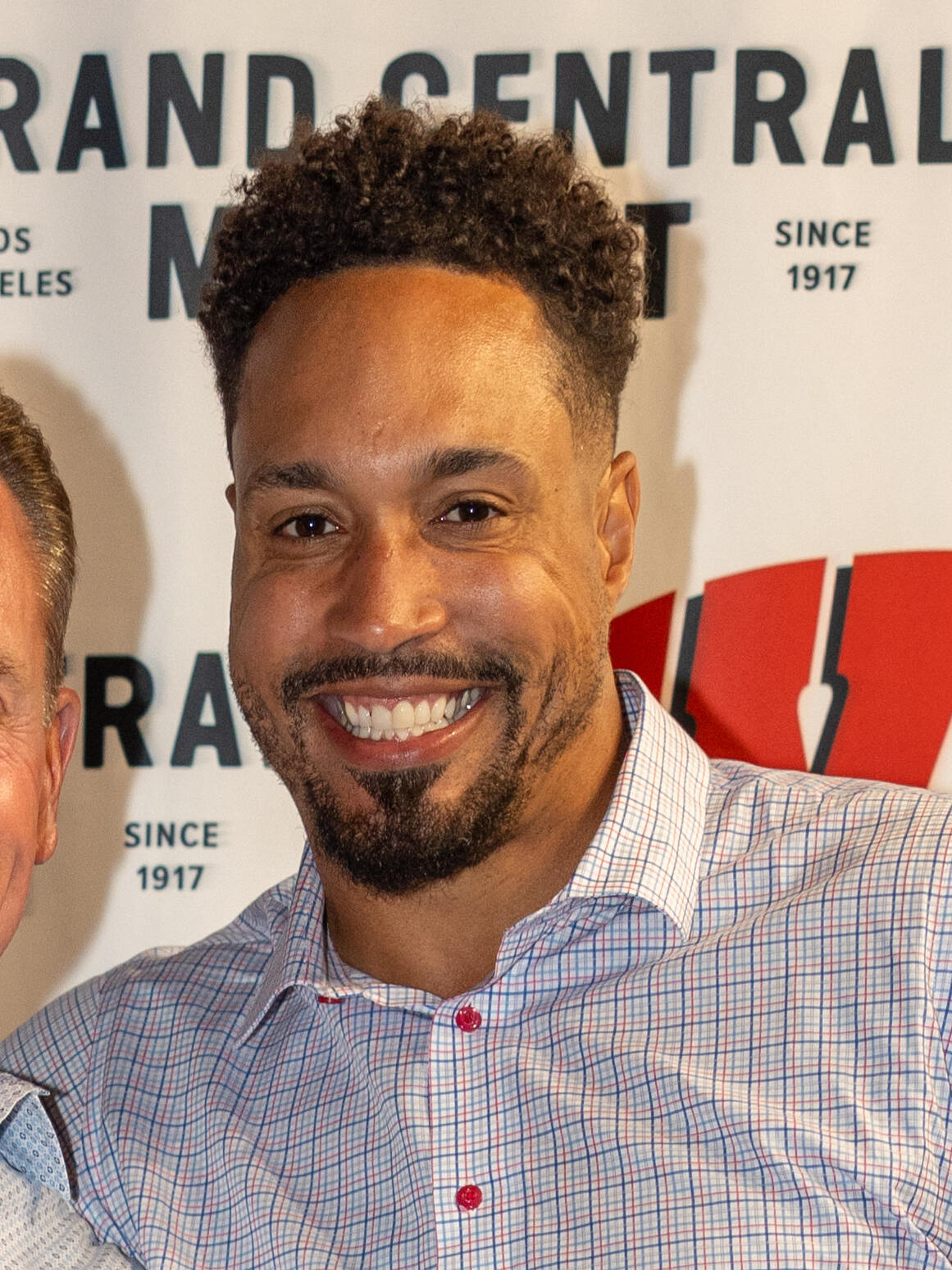
- Beckum in 2024

No. 47
- Position: Tight end

Personal information
- Born: January 24, 1987 (age 39); Milwaukee, Wisconsin, U.S.
- Listed height: 6 ft 3 in (1.91 m)
- Listed weight: 243 lb (110 kg)

Career information
- High school: Oak Creek (Oak Creek, Wisconsin)
- College: Wisconsin
- NFL draft: 2009: 3rd round, 100th overall pick

Career history
- New York Giants (2009–2012); Seattle Seahawks (2014)*; New Orleans Saints (2014)*
- * Offseason or practice squad member only

Awards and highlights
- Super Bowl champion (XLVI); Ozzie Newsome Award (2007); First-team All-American (2007); First-team All-Big Ten (2007); Second-team All-Big Ten (2006)

Career NFL statistics
- Receptions: 26
- Receiving yards: 264
- Receiving touchdowns: 3
- Stats at Pro Football Reference

Travis Tyrell Beckum (born January 24, 1987) is an American former professional football player who was a tight end for the New York Giants of the National Football League (NFL). He played college football for the Wisconsin Badgers, earning first-team All-American honors in 2007. He was selected by the Giants in the third round of the 2009 NFL draft.

== Early life ==
Travis Beckum played football for Oak Creek High School. He participated in the 2005 U.S. Army All-American Bowl where he was the leading tackler.

== College career ==
In 2005, Beckum saw limited action in 10 games as reserve on defense and on special teams. The following year Beckum switched to the tight end position and saw more action. Beckum was a semifinalist for the John Mackey Award and was named second-team All-American by Walter Camp and SI.com. He caught 61 passes for 903 yards and 5 scores as a sophomore, and improved to 75, 982 and 6 as a junior. He was at his best in the biggest games, totaling 10 catches and 132 yards in a shootout against Michigan St, 11 for 160 at rival Illinois, and 9 for 140 at Ohio St.

On October 26, 2008, Beckum broke his leg in a 27-17 win over Illinois, ending his senior season. He finished with just 23 catches and 264 yards as a senior, but is regarded as one of the best at his position in Wisconsin history.

== Professional career ==
=== New York Giants ===
Beckum was selected by the New York Giants in the third round as the 100th overall pick of the 2009 NFL draft. In his rookie year, Beckum started 2 games out 15 played and had 8 receptions for 55 yards. The next year, 2010, he played in all 16 games, starting in 2, and had 13 receptions and a total of 116 yards and 2 touchdowns. Beckum caught 5 passes for 93 yards (18.6 yards per catch) and one touchdown as a backup tight end to Jake Ballard in 2011. During Super Bowl XLVI, Beckum tore his ACL. Despite his injury, the Giants won Super Bowl XLVI against the New England Patriots 21-17.

On August 27, 2012, Beckum was placed on the physically unable to perform list. On November 3, Beckum was activated after Mitch Petrus was released.

=== Seattle Seahawks ===
Beckum signed with the Seattle Seahawks on February 10, 2014.

On May 19, 2014, the Seattle Seahawks released Beckum along with Jimmy Legree to make room on the 90 man roster.

=== New Orleans Saints ===
Beckum signed with the New Orleans Saints on August 13, 2014. The Saints released Beckum on August 26, 2014.

=== Professional statistics ===
		Receiving							Fumbles	
Year	Team	G	GS	Rec	Yds	Avg	Lng	TD	FUM	Lost
2009	NYG	15	2	8	55	6.9	15	0	-	-
2010	NYG	16	0	13	116	8.9	29	2	-	-
2011	NYG	13	0	5	93	18.6	67	1	-	-
Total'		44	4	26	264	10.2	67	3	0	0
