= Taylor Mehlhaff =

American football player and coach (born 1985)

No. 5
- Position: Kicker

Personal information
- Born: August 25, 1985 (age 41); Aberdeen, South Dakota, U.S.
- Listed height: 5 ft 10 in (1.78 m)
- Listed weight: 184 lb (83 kg)

Career information
- High school: Central (Aberdeen)
- College: Wisconsin
- NFL draft: 2008: 6th round, 178th overall pick

Career history

Playing
- New Orleans Saints (2008); Minnesota Vikings (2009)*; Hartford Colonials (2010)
- * Offseason or practice squad member only

Coaching
- University of Wisconsin (2015-present) Kicking specialist

Awards and highlights
- First-team All-American (2007); First-team All-Big Ten (2007); Second-team All-Big Ten (2006)

Career NFL statistics
- Field goals: 3-4 (75%)
- Extra points: 9-10 (90%)
- Field goal long: 44
- Stats at Pro Football Reference

Taylor Mehlhaff (born August 25, 1985) is an American former professional football player who was a placekicker in the National Football League (NFL). He played college football for the Wisconsin Badgers, earning first-team All-American honors in 2007. He was selected by the New Orleans Saints in the sixth round of the 2008 NFL draft.

Mehlhaff was also a member of the Minnesota Vikings and Hartford Colonials.

== Early life ==
Mehlhaff was a star four sport athlete at Central High School in Aberdeen, South Dakota. He was the 2003 South Dakota Gatorade High School player of the year as Quarterback & Kicker.

Other awards include: Riddell First-team All-American & USA Today 2nd Team All-American, 2004 Rivals.com #1 Ranked Prep Kicker in the Nation. Chris Sailer Kicking #1 ranked kicker in the country for the class of 2004.

== College career ==
"Taylor Mehlhaff teamed with punter Ken DeBauche to form what many experts felt was the best kicking tandem in college football in recent years." -NFLDraftScout.com

Mehlhaff was a 2-time All-Big Ten performer & 2-time University of Wisconsin Special Teams player of the year.

Other awards include: Lou Groza Award Semi-finalist, 2007 First-team AFCA All-American & Sports Illustrated All-American, 3rd All-Time UW scoring leader behind NCAA career scoring leader Montee Ball and former Heisman Trophy winner Ron Dayne.

== Professional career ==
=== New Orleans Saints ===
Mehlhaff was selected 178th overall in the sixth round by the New Orleans Saints in the 2008 NFL draft. The Saints released Mehlhaff during final cuts after he lost out to Martin Gramatica. Mehlhaff signed a 3-year contract worth $1.3 Million.

In October 2008, Gramatica's career ended as he was placed on injured reserve, and the Saints re-signed Mehlhaff. Mehlhaff was later released in the 2008 season: the Saints replaced him with Garrett Hartley, who at the time was a rookie free agent.

=== Minnesota Vikings ===
Mehlhaff was signed to a futures contract by the Minnesota Vikings on December 31, 2008, and was waived on September 1, 2009.

=== Hartford Colonials ===
Mehlhaff kicked for the Hartford Colonials of the United Football League in 2010 finishing 10–13 on field goal attempts.

== Post-playing career ==
Mehlhaff helped coach the Specialists at the University of Wisconsin before signing a contract with the Hartford Colonials.

Mehlhaff served at the University of Tennessee as Special Teams Quality Control. As of February 2015 he joined the coaching staff of his Alma Matar, Wisconsin as a Special Teams Quality Control.

Mehlhaff is the owner of Taylor Mehlhaff Kicking LLC. He is also the author of "Kicking for Success", a book for aspiring athletes. Mehlhaff was one of 30 coaches selected to the NFL Coaches Academy in 2017. In September 2018, Mehlhaff became a member of the Aberdeen Central High School Hall of Fame.

Mehlhaff is married to former NFL cheerleader, Ashlyn "Falgout" Mehlhaff of the New Orleans Saints.
