= Jeff Traylor =

American football player and coach (born 1968)

- Traylor in 2026

Current position
- Title: Head coach
- Team: UTSA
- Conference: American
- Record: 60–28

Biographical details
- Born: May 9, 1968 (age 58); Gilmer, Texas, U.S.

Playing career
- 1986–1989: Stephen F. Austin
- Position: Tight end

Coaching career (HC unless noted)
- 1989–1992: Big Sandy HS (TX) (assistant)
- 1993–1999: Jacksonville HS (TX) (assistant)
- 2000–2014: Gilmer HS (TX)
- 2015–2016: Texas (ST/TE)
- 2017: SMU (AHC/RB)
- 2018–2019: Arkansas (AHC/RB)
- 2020–present: UTSA

Head coaching record
- Overall: 60–28 (college); 175–26 (high school)
- Bowls: 3–3

Accomplishments and honors

Championships
- 2 C-USA (2021, 2022); 1 C-USA West Division (2021)

Awards
- 2× C-USA Coach of the Year (2021, 2022)

Jeffrey Michael Traylor (born May 9, 1968) is an American football coach. He is the head football coach at the University of Texas at San Antonio (UTSA), a position he has held since the 2020 season.

== Early life ==
Traylor attended Gilmer High School and graduated in 1986. He attended Stephen F. Austin State University, where he was a walk-on for the Lumberjacks football program. He earned both his undergraduate (1990) and graduate (2002) degrees in education.

== Career ==
=== High school ===
Traylor began his coaching career at Big Sandy High School, where he spent four years as an assistant coach from 1989 to 1992. He was later hired as an assistant coach at Jacksonville High School from 1993 to 1999, where he served as passing coordinator, defensive backs coach, receivers coach and special teams coordinator. There, he helped coach future NFL quarterbacks Josh McCown and Luke McCown and former Texas A&M standout signal-caller Randy McCown.

Traylor then coached at Gilmer High School where he was named four-time Texas High School Coach of the Year for Class 4A, and posted a 175–26 record (.871 winning percentage). During his 15-year tenure, Traylor led the Buckeyes to appearances in five state championship games (2004, 2007, 2009, 2012, and 2014), winning three state titles (2004, 2009, and 2014) and 12 district crowns. In 2015, Gilmer renamed Buckeye Stadium to Jeff Traylor Stadium to honor Traylor's success. At Gilmer, Traylor coached future NFL players Kenneth Pettway, Manuel Johnson, Curtis Brown, David Snow, G. J. Kinne, Gus Johnson, Blake Lynch, and Kris Boyd.

=== Texas ===
Traylor began his collegiate career in 2015 at the University of Texas at Austin as the special teams coordinator and tight ends coach under Charlie Strong before becoming the Longhorns associate head coach for offense and wide receivers coach in 2016. While with the Texas Longhorns football program Traylor helped sign the No. 7-ranked recruiting class in the country in back-to-back years and was named Big 12 Recruiter of the Year.

=== SMU ===
In 2017, Traylor became the associate head coach and running backs coach for Southern Methodist University before joining the Arkansas Razorbacks in the same role. Both of these jobs were under coach Chad Morris who had also previously been a Texas high school coach.

=== Arkansas ===
For the 2018 and 2019 football seasons, Traylor served as the associate head coach and running back coach at the University of Arkansas under head coach Chad Morris.

=== UTSA ===
In December 2019, Traylor left the Arkansas Razorbacks football program to become the third head coach in program history at UTSA.

Traylor tested positive for COVID-19 on December 23, 2020, and missed the 2020 First Responder Bowl as a result.

In 2021, Traylor led the Roadrunners to their best start in program history for a season, winning their first eleven regular season games before finishing the regular season 11-1. The UTSA Roadrunners also secured their first conference championship, defeating Western Kentucky 49-41, followed by a bowl bid to the 2021 Frisco Bowl, losing to San Diego State University by a score of 38-24, posting a final record for the year of 12-2.

== Personal life ==
Traylor married his wife, Cari, in 1992. They have three children: Jordan, Jake, and Jaci. Jordan played as a quarterback for Gilmer High School and the Texas A&M Aggies.

== Head coaching record ==
=== High school ===
Yearly record table
Season	Conf	Dist	Overall record	District record	Playoff record	School	Notes
2000	3A D1	16	6-4			Gilmer High School (175-26)	
2001	3A D1	16	8-3		0-1	Gilmer High School (175-26)	
2002	3A D2	11	8-3		0-1	Gilmer High School (175-26)	
2003	3A D2	11	13-1		3-1	Gilmer High School (175-26)	State Quarterfinalist
2004	3A D2	13	16-0	4-0	6-0	Gilmer High School (175-26)	State Champion
2005	3A D2	13	10-2	4-0	1-1	Gilmer High School (175-26)	
2006	3A D1	15	10-1	5-0	0-1	Gilmer High School (175-26)	
2007	3A D1	15	14-1	5-0	4-1	Gilmer High School (175-26)	State Runner Up
2008	3A D2	17	12-2	5-0	3-1	Gilmer High School (175-26)	State Quarterfinalist
2009	3A D2	17	15-0	5-0	5-0	Gilmer High School (175-26)	State Champion
2010	3A D2	16	9-4	4-1	2-1	Gilmer High School (175-26)	
2011	3A D2	16	13-1	5-0	3-1	Gilmer High School (175-26)	State Quarterfinalist
2012	3A D2	16	14-2	6-0	5-1	Gilmer High School (175-26)	State Runner Up
2013	3A D2	16	11-2	5-1	2-1	Gilmer High School (175-26)	
2014	4A D2	5	16-0	5-0	6-0	Gilmer High School (175-26)	State Champion

=== College ===
Year	Team	Overall	Conference	Standing	Bowl/playoffs
UTSA Roadrunners (Conference USA) (2020–2022)
2020	UTSA	7–5	5–2	2nd (West)	L First Responder (Note: Prior to the bowl game, Traylor tested positive for COVID-19. Associate head coach Barry Lunney Jr. was UTSA's acting head coach for the game.)
2021	UTSA	12–2	7–1	1st (West)	L Frisco
2022	UTSA	11–3	8–0	1st	L Cure
UTSA Roadrunners (American Athletic Conference / American Conference) (2023–present)
2023	UTSA	9–4	7–1	3rd	W Frisco
2024	UTSA	7–6	4–4	T–6th	W Myrtle Beach
2025	UTSA	7–6	4–4	T–6th	W First Responder
2026	UTSA	9–2	6–1		
UTSA:		60–28	39-13		
Total:		60–28			
National championship Conference title Conference division title or championship game berth
