= 2013 Pittsburgh Steelers season =

67th US team football season

- Owner: The Rooney Family
- General manager: Kevin Colbert
- Head coach: Mike Tomlin
- Offensive coordinator: Todd Haley
- Defensive coordinator: Dick LeBeau
- Home stadium: Heinz Field

Results
- Record: 8–8
- Division place: 2nd AFC North
- Playoffs: Did not qualify
- Pro Bowlers: WR Antonio Brown; SS Troy Polamalu
- Team MVP: Antonio Brown
- Team ROY: Le'Veon Bell

Uniform
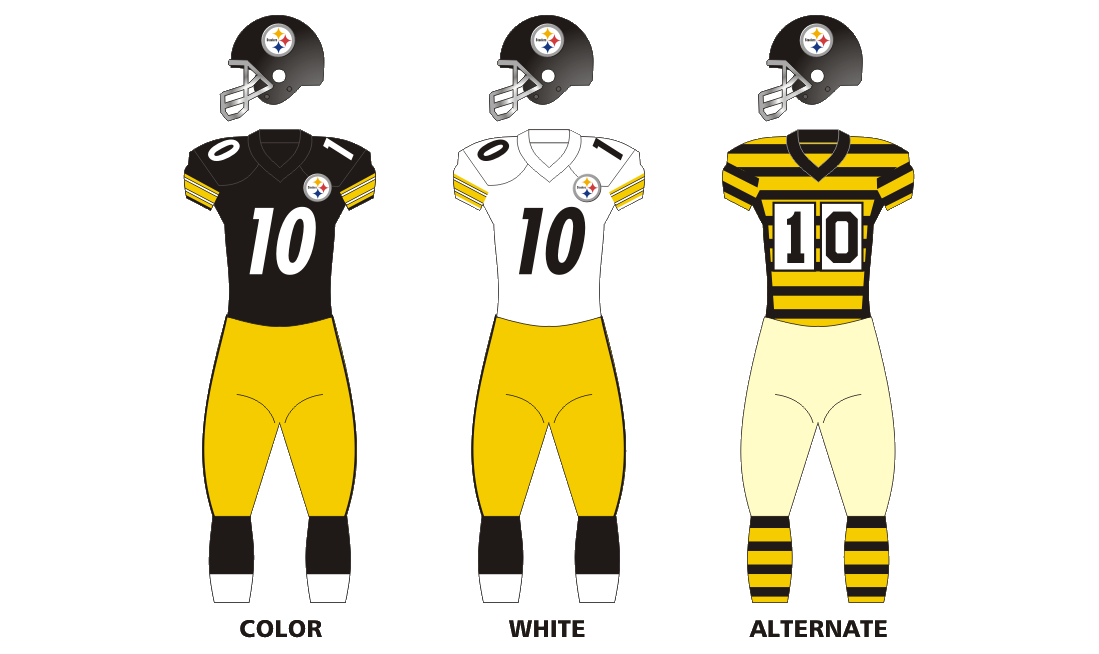

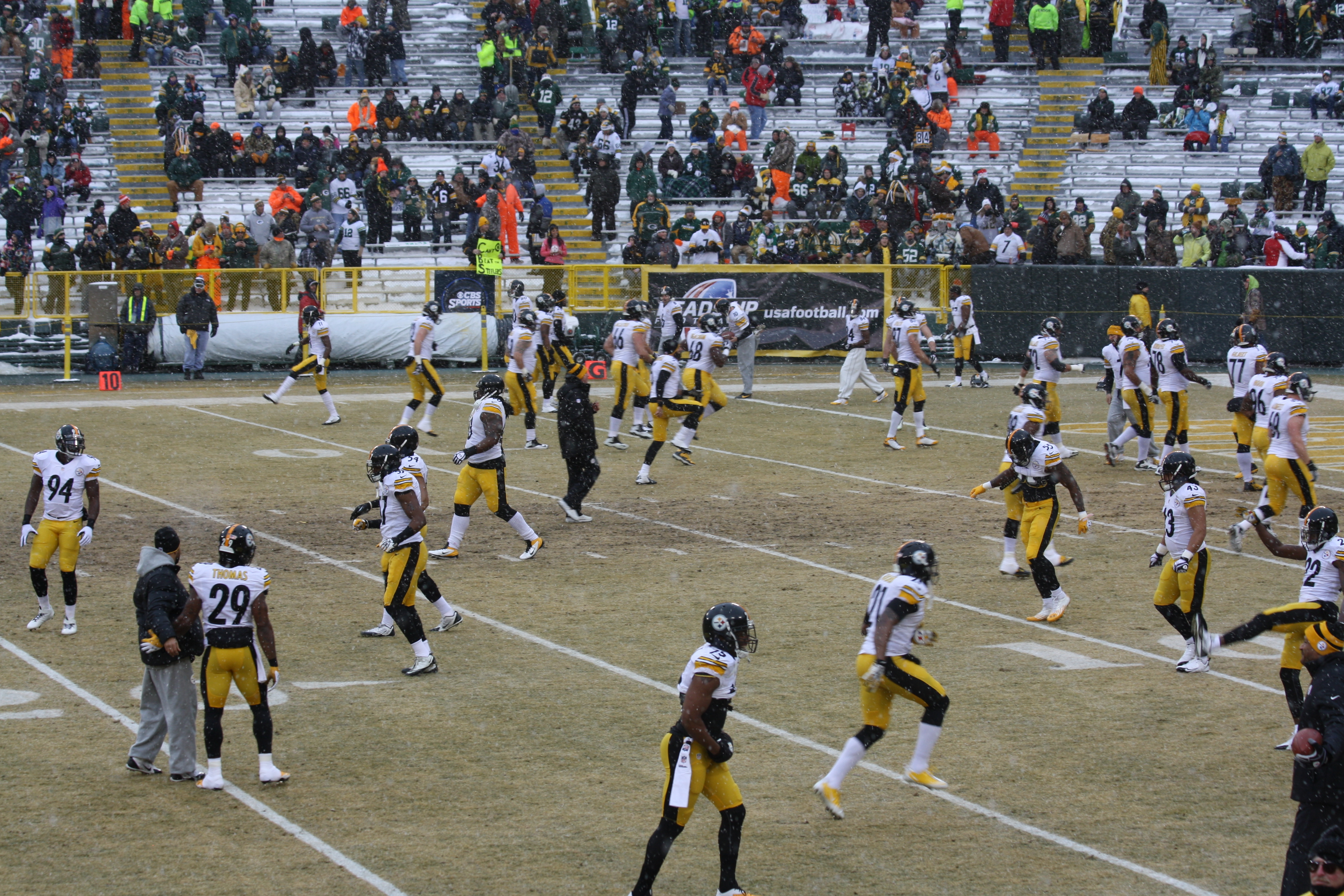
Players warming up before Week 16 at Green Bay

The 2013 season was the Pittsburgh Steelers' 81st in the National Football League (NFL), their 14th under general manager Kevin Colbert and their seventh under head coach Mike Tomlin.

The Steelers finished the season 8–8, competing with the Baltimore Ravens, Miami Dolphins, and San Diego Chargers for the final AFC playoff spot going into Week 17. The Steelers tried to prevent their worst start since 1968 in Week 4, but the Minnesota Vikings would defeat them 34–27 in London. Baltimore, Miami, and San Diego were all 8–7 going into Week 17, while Pittsburgh was 7–8. This meant that the Steelers had to win and the Ravens, Dolphins, and Chargers all had to lose. Despite a win from the Steelers and losses from the Ravens and Dolphins, the Chargers went on to beat the Kansas City Chiefs 27–24 in overtime, taking the final playoff spot. It was the first season since the 1999 and 2000 seasons that the Steelers would miss back-to-back postseasons.

== Personnel ==
=== Staff / Coaches ===
2013 Pittsburgh Steelers staff
| Front office: Chairman emeritus – Daniel M. Rooney; President – Arthur J. Rooney II; Vice president – Arthur J. Rooney, Jr.; Administration advisor – Chuck Noll; Administrative assistant – Diane Lowe; Business office; Director of business – Mark Hart; Controller – Bob Tyler; Business administration – Dan Ferens; HR manager – Katrina Smith; Assistant controller – Jodie Spagnolli; Payroll/benefits administrator – Kelly Serafin; Administrative assistant – Rebecca Mihalcik; Administrative assistant – Colleen Kimmel; Media relations; Communications coordinator – Burt Lauten; Public relations/media manager – Nathan LoCascio; Public relations assistant – Ryan Scarpino; Community relations; Community relations manager – Michele Rosenthal; Administrative assistant – Stacie Lawrence; Information technology; Technology manager – Scott Phelps; IT/network support technician – Jon Pugliano; Digital media assistant – Scott Graham; Steelers.com/Steelers Digest; Editor – Bob Labriola; Assistant editor/website – Teresa Varley; Steelers tv/steelers.com reporter – Missi Matthews; Photography; Team photographer – Karl Roser; Football operations; General manager – Kevin Colbert; Director of football and business administration – Omar Khan; Football administration coordinator – Samir Suleiman; Player personnel coordinator – Dan Rooney, Jr.; College scouting coordinator – Phil Kreidler; Pro scouting coordinator – Brandon Hunt; Senior assistant player personnel – Bill Nunn; Senior assistant college scouting – Ron Hughes; College scout – Mark Bruener; College scout – Mike Butler; College/pro scout – Dan Colbert; College scout – Mark Gorscak; BLESTO scout – Chidi Iwuoma; College scout – Bruce McNorton; Pro/college scout – David Petett; Administrative assistant – Maureen Mannion; Administrative assistant – Karen Mercalde; Head coaches: Head coach – Mike Tomlin; Assistant head coach/defensive line – John Mitchell; Offensive coaches: Offensive coordinator – Todd Haley; Quarterbacks – Randy Fichtner; Running backs – James Saxon; Wide receivers – Richard Mann; Tight ends – James Daniel; Offensive line – Jack Bicknell Jr.; Offensive assistant – Shaun Sarrett | Defensive coaches: Defensive coordinator – Dick LeBeau; Linebackers – Keith Butler; Defensive backs – Carnell Lake; Defensive assistant – Jerry Olsavsky; Special teams coaches: Special teams coordinator – Danny Smith; Strength and conditioning: Conditioning coach – Garrett Giemont; Conditioning assistant – Marcel Pastoor; Player development – Raymond Jackson; Administrative assistant – Chrissy Bulger; Administrative assistant – Mia Daudet; Medical staff; Physician, internal medicine – Dr. Mark Duca; Physician, internal medicine – Dr. Tony Yates; Physician, neurosurgery – Dr. Joseph Maroon; Physician, orthopedic surgery – Dr. James P. Bradley; Athletic training staff; Head athletic trainer – John Norwig; Assistant athletic trainer – Ryan Grove; Assistant athletic trainer – Sonia Gysland; Football equipment staff; Equipment manager – Rodgers Freyvogel; Field manager/assistant equipment manager – Patrick Noone; Video; Video/facilities coordinator – Bob McCartney; Video assistant – Andy Lizanich; Video assistant – Todd Lewis |

=== Final roster ===
2013 Pittsburgh Steelers roster
| Quarterbacks (QB): 5 Bruce Gradkowski; 3 Landry Jones; 7 Ben Roethlisberger; Running backs (RB): 26 Le'Veon Bell; 27 Jonathan Dwyer; 46 Will Johnson FB; 23 Felix Jones; Wide receivers (WR): 84 Antonio Brown; 89 Jerricho Cotchery; 14 Derek Moye; 88 Emmanuel Sanders; 11 Markus Wheaton; Tight ends (TE): 83 Heath Miller; 82 Michael Palmer; 81 David Paulson; 87 Matt Spaeth | Offensive linemen (OL): 76 Mike Adams T; 68 Kelvin Beachum T; 66 David DeCastro G; 73 Ramon Foster G; 77 Marcus Gilbert T; 62 Eric Olsen G; 71 David Snow C/G; 72 Cody Wallace C; 78 Guy Whimper G; Defensive linemen (DL): 69 Brian Arnfelt DE; 92 Hebron Fangupo NT; 97 Cameron Heyward DE; 96 Ziggy Hood; 99 Brett Keisel DE; 90 Steve McLendon NT; 65 Al Woods NT | Linebackers (LB): 54 Chris Carter OLB; 57 Terence Garvin ILB; 95 Jarvis Jones OLB; 55 Stevenson Sylvester ILB; 94 Lawrence Timmons ILB; 98 Vince Williams ILB; 44 Jamaal Westerman OLB; 93 Jason Worilds OLB; Defensive backs (DB): 28 Cortez Allen CB; 20 Will Allen SS; 41 Antwon Blake CB; 25 Ryan Clark FS; 22 William Gay CB; 21 Robert Golden FS; 39 Isaiah Green CB; 43 Troy Polamalu SS; 24 Ike Taylor CB; 29 Shamarko Thomas SS; Special teams (ST): 10 Mat McBriar P; 6 Shaun Suisham K; 60 Greg Warren LS | Practice squad: 33 Alvester Alexander RB; 15 Justin Brown WR; 79 Bryant Browning G; 91 Hall Davis DE; 74 Chris Hubbard T; 19 Kashif Moore WR; 40 Ross Ventrone SS; 48 Kion Wilson LB; Reserve: 31 Curtis Brown CB (IR); 67 Levi Brown T (IR); 80 Plaxico Burress WR (IR); -- Nik Embernate G (IR); 50 Larry Foote ILB (IR); 85 David Johnson TE (IR); 53 Maurkice Pouncey C (IR); 51 Sean Spence ILB (IR); 34 LaRod Stephens-Howling RB (IR); 61 Fernando Velasco C (IR); -- Nick Williams DE (IR); 56 LaMarr Woodley OLB (IR); Rookies in italics 53 active, 12 reserve, 8 practice squad |

== Draft class ==
2013 Pittsburgh Steelers draft
| Round | Pick | Player | Position | College | Notes |
| 1 | 17 | Jarvis Jones | OLB | Georgia | |
| 2 | 48 | Le'Veon Bell * | RB | Michigan State | Team Rookie of the Year |
| 3 | 79 | Markus Wheaton | WR | Oregon State | |
| 4 | 111 | Shamarko Thomas | SS | Syracuse | Pick from CLE^{[a]} |
| 4 | 115 | Landry Jones | QB | Oklahoma | |
| 5 | 150 | Terry Hawthorne | CB | Illinois | |
| 6 | 186 | Justin Brown | WR | Oklahoma | |
| 6 | 206 | Vince Williams | ILB | Florida State | Compensatory^{[b]} |
| 7 | 223 | Nicholas Williams | DE | Samford | |
Made roster † Pro Football Hall of Fame * Made at least one Pro Bowl during career

Notes

^{^[a]} The Steelers acquired this fourth-round selection in a trade that sent their 2014 third-round selection to the Cleveland Browns.
^{^[b]} Compensatory selection.

== Schedule ==
=== Preseason ===
| Week | Date | Opponent | Result | Record | Venue | Recap |
|---|---|---|---|---|---|---|
| 1 | August 10 | New York Giants | **L** 13–18 | 0–1 | Heinz Field | Recap |
| 2 | August 19 | at Washington Redskins | **L** 13–24 | 0–2 | FedExField | Recap |
| 3 | August 24 | Kansas City Chiefs | **L** 20–26 (OT) | 0–3 | Heinz Field | Recap |
| 4 | August 29 | at Carolina Panthers | **L** 10–25 | 0–4 | Bank of America Stadium | Recap |

=== Regular season ===
| Week | Date | Opponent | Result | Record | Venue | Recap |
|---|---|---|---|---|---|---|
| 1 | September 8 | Tennessee Titans | **L** 9–16 | 0–1 | Heinz Field | Recap |
| 2 | September 16 | at **Cincinnati Bengals** | **L** 10–20 | 0–2 | Paul Brown Stadium | Recap |
| 3 | September 22 | Chicago Bears | **L** 23–40 | 0–3 | Heinz Field | Recap |
| 4 | September 29 | at Minnesota Vikings | **L** 27–34 | 0–4 | (United Kingdom) Wembley Stadium (London) | Recap |
| 5 | Bye | | | | | |
| 6 | October 13 | at New York Jets | **W** 19–6 | 1–4 | MetLife Stadium | Recap |
| 7 | October 20 | **Baltimore Ravens** | **W** 19–16 | 2–4 | Heinz Field | Recap |
| 8 | October 27 | at Oakland Raiders | **L** 18–21 | 2–5 | O.co Coliseum | Recap |
| 9 | November 3 | at New England Patriots | **L** 31–55 | 2–6 | Gillette Stadium | Recap |
| 10 | November 10 | Buffalo Bills | **W** 23–10 | 3–6 | Heinz Field | Recap |
| 11 | November 17 | Detroit Lions | **W** 37–27 | 4–6 | Heinz Field | Recap |
| 12 | November 24 | at **Cleveland Browns** | **W** 27–11 | 5–6 | FirstEnergy Stadium | Recap |
| 13 | November 28 | at **Baltimore Ravens** | **L** 20–22 | 5–7 | M&T Bank Stadium | Recap |
| 14 | December 8 | Miami Dolphins | **L** 28–34 | 5–8 | Heinz Field | Recap |
| 15 | December 15 | **Cincinnati Bengals** | **W** 30–20 | 6–8 | Heinz Field | Recap |
| 16 | December 22 | at Green Bay Packers | **W** 38–31 | 7–8 | Lambeau Field | Recap |
| 17 | December 29 | **Cleveland Browns** | **W** 20–7 | 8–8 | Heinz Field | Recap |

Note: Intra-division opponents are in bold text.

=== Game summaries ===
==== Week 1: vs. Tennessee Titans ====
Week One: Tennessee Titans at Pittsburgh Steelers – Game summary

| Quarter | 1 | 2 | 3 | 4 | Total |
|---|---|---|---|---|---|
| **Titans** | 0 | 7 | 3 | 6 | **16** |
| Steelers | 2 | 0 | 0 | 7 | **9** |

at Heinz Field, Pittsburgh, Pennsylvania

- Date: September 8
- Game time: 1:00 p.m. EDT
- Game weather: 72 °F (22 °C), (Cloudy)
- Game attendance: 61,585
- Referee: Jerome Boger
- TV announcers (CBS): Ian Eagle and Dan Fouts
- Recap, Game book

Game information

**First quarter**

- PIT – Darius Reynaud tackled in the endzone for a safety, 14:57. Steelers 2–0.

**Second quarter**

- TEN – Jackie Battle 3-yard run (Rob Bironas kick), 0:44. Titans 7–2. **Drive: 12 plays, 49 yards, 6:48.**

**Third quarter**

- TEN – Rob Bironas 26-yard field goal, 4:29. Titans 10–2. **Drive: 11 plays, 37 yards, 5:58.**

**Fourth quarter**

- TEN – Rob Bironas 44-yard field goal, 6:01. Titans 13–2. **Drive: 11 plays, 62 yards, 6:19.**
- TEN – Rob Bironas 27-yard field goal, 3:53. Titans 16–2. **Drive: 4 plays, 8 yards, 1:00.**
- PIT – Jerricho Cotchery 4-yard pass from Ben Roethlisberger (Shaun Suisham kick), 1:23. Titans 16–9. **Drive: 9 plays, 75 yards, 2:30.**

**Top passers**

- TEN – Jake Locker – 11/20, 125 yards
- PIT – Ben Roethlisberger – 21/33, 191 yards, TD, INT

**Top rushers**

- TEN – Chris Johnson – 25 rushes, 70 yards
- PIT – LaRod Stephens-Howling – 6 rushes, 19 yards

**Top receivers**

- TEN – Nate Washington – 4 receptions, 46 yards
- PIT – Antonio Brown – 5 receptions, 71 yards

The Steelers started their 2013 season at home against the Titans. They scored first when Darius Reynaud down the ball in their own end zone to give the Steelers a safety for a 2–0 lead in the first quarter. In the 2nd quarter, the Titans took the lead as Jackie Battle ran for a 3-yard TD to make the score 7–2 at halftime. After the break, the Titans went right back to work as Rob Bironas nailed 3 field goals starting off in the 3rd quarter when he nailed one from 26 yards and also two in the 4th quarter from 44 and 27 yards out to take leads of 10–2, 13–2, and 16–2 respectively. The Steelers then tried their luck at a comeback attempt but only came up short as Ben Roethlisberger found Jerricho Cotchery on a 4-yard TD pass for a final score of 16–9 and their 3rd straight 0–1 seasonal start.

==== Week 2: at Cincinnati Bengals ====
Week Two: Pittsburgh Steelers at Cincinnati Bengals – Game summary

| Quarter | 1 | 2 | 3 | 4 | Total |
|---|---|---|---|---|---|
| Steelers | 3 | 7 | 0 | 0 | **10** |
| **Bengals** | 7 | 3 | 7 | 3 | **20** |

at Paul Brown Stadium, Cincinnati, Ohio

- Date: September 16
- Game time: 8:40 pm. EDT
- Game weather: 62 °F (17 °C), clear
- Game attendance: 64,585
- Referee: Mike Carey
- TV announcers (ESPN): Mike Tirico, Jon Gruden and Lisa Salters
- Recap, Game book

Game information

**First quarter**

- PIT – Shaun Suisham 44-yard field goal, 10:52. Steelers 3–0. **Drive: 4 plays, 8 yards, 1:26.**
- CIN – Giovani Bernard 7-yard run (Mike Nugent kick), 0:57. Bengals 7–3. **Drive: 5 plays, 87 yards, 1:45.**

**Second quarter**

- CIN – Mike Nugent 41-yard field goal, 13:16. Bengals 10–3. **Drive: 8 plays, 35 yards, 1:45.**
- PIT – Derek Moye 1-yard pass from Ben Roethlisberger (Shaun Suisham kick), 1:54. Tied 10–10. **Drive: 5 plays, 65 yards, 2:19.**

**Third quarter**

- CIN – Giovani Bernard 27-yard pass from Andy Dalton (Mike Nugent kick), 6:08. Bengals 17–10. **Drive: 8 plays, 78 yards, 5:08.**

**Fourth quarter**

- CIN – Mike Nugent 25-yard field goal, 7:51. Bengals 20–10. **Drive: 14 plays, 57 yards, 6:51.**

**Top passers**

- PIT – Ben Roethlisberger – 20/37, 251 yards, TD, INT
- CIN – Andy Dalton – 25/45, 280 yards, TD

**Top rushers**

- PIT – Felix Jones – 10 rushes, 37 yards
- CIN – BenJarvus Green-Ellis – 22 rushes, 75 yards

**Top receivers**

- PIT – Emmanuel Sanders – 5 receptions, 78 yards
- CIN – Jermaine Gresham – 6 receptions, 66 yards

After a tough season-opening loss, the Steelers traveled to Cincinnati to take on the Bengals. The Steelers scored first when Shaun Suisham scored a field goal from 44 yards out to make the score 3–0. The Bengals took the lead as Giovani Bernard ran for a 7-yard touchdown making the score 7–3. The Bengals scored again in the 2nd quarter as Mike Nugent nailed a 41-yard field goal to make the score 10–3, followed up by Ben Roethlisberger finding Derek Moye on a 1-yard pass to tie the game at 10–10 at halftime. The Bengals retook the lead in the 3rd quarter as Andy Dalton found Bernard on a 27-yard pass to make the score 17–10, which was followed up by Nugent's 25-yard field goal in the 4th quarter for a final score of 20–10.

With their 2nd straight loss to the Bengals, the Steelers started a season 0–2 for the first time since 2002.

==== Week 3: vs. Chicago Bears ====
Week Three: Chicago Bears at Pittsburgh Steelers – Game summary

| Quarter | 1 | 2 | 3 | 4 | Total |
|---|---|---|---|---|---|
| **Bears** | 17 | 7 | 3 | 13 | **40** |
| Steelers | 0 | 10 | 10 | 3 | **23** |

at Heinz Field, Pittsburgh, Pennsylvania

- Date: September 22
- Game time: 8:30 pm. EDT
- Game weather: 52 °F (11 °C), (Cloudy)
- Game attendance: 61,575
- Referee: Pete Morelli
- TV announcers (NBC): Al Michaels, Cris Collinsworth and Michele Tafoya
- Recap, Game book

Game information

**First quarter**

- CHI – Robbie Gould 47-yard field goal, 8:02. Bears 3–0. **Drive: 13 plays, 51 yards, 6:58.**
- CHI – Matt Forte 5-yard run (Robbie Gould kick), 5:05. Bears 10–0. **Drive: 4 plays, 17 yards, 1:37.**
- CHI – Michael Bush 1-yard run (Robbie Gould kick), 2:01. Bears 17–0. **Drive: 5 plays, 60 yards, 1:56.**

**Second quarter**

- PIT – Shaun Suisham 27-yard field goal, 13:36. Bears 17–3. **Drive: 9 plays, 71 yards, 3:25.**
- CHI – Major Wright 38-yard interception return (Robbie Gould kick), 8:57. Bears 24–3.
- PIT – Antonio Brown 33-yard pass from Ben Roethlisberger (Shaun Suisham kick), 6:27. Bears 24–10. **Drive: 6 plays, 75 yards, 2:30.**

**Third quarter**

- CHI – Robbie Gould 32-yard field goal, 10:54. Bears 27–10. **Drive: 6 plays, 14 yards, 3:23.**
- PIT – Shaun Suisham 36-yard field goal, 5:38. Bears 27–13. **Drive: 10 plays, 62 yards, 5:16.**
- PIT – Antonio Brown 21-yard pass from Ben Roethlisberger (Shaun Suisham kick), 1:50. Bears 27–20. **Drive: 3 plays, 69 yards, 1:30.**

**Fourth quarter**

- PIT – Shaun Suisham 44-yard field goal, 10:38. Bears 27–23. **Drive: 11 plays, 52 yards, 4:31.**
- CHI – Earl Bennett 17-yard pass from Jay Cutler (Robbie Gould kick), 5:48. Bears 34–23. **Drive: 9 plays, 74 yards, 4:50.**
- CHI – Julius Peppers 42-yard fumble return (kick failed), 3:57. Bears 40–23.

**Top passers**

- CHI – Jay Cutler – 20/30, 159 yards, TD
- PIT – Ben Roethlisberger – 26/41, 406 yards, 2 TD, 2 INT

**Top rushers**

- CHI – Matt Forte – 16 rushes, 87 yards, TD
- PIT – Jonathan Dwyer – 12 rushes, 39 yards

**Top receivers**

- CHI – Brandon Marshall – 5 receptions, 52 yards
- PIT – Antonio Brown – 9 receptions, 196 yards, 2 TD

The Steelers returned home after a tough road loss to the Bengals to take on the Bears. The first quarter was all Bears as they scored 17 unanswered points with Robbie Gould nailing a 47-yard field goal for a 3–0 lead followed up by Matt Forte's 5-yard touchdown run to make the score 10–0 and then Michael Bush's 1-yard touchdown run for a 17–0 lead. The Steelers managed to get on the board in the 2nd quarter when Shaun Suisham nailed a 27-yard field goal to shorten the lead to 17–3, however the Bears increased their lead when Major Wright returned an interception 38 yards for a touchdown to make the score 24–3. The Steelers came within 14 points at halftime as Ben Roethlisberger found Antonio Brown on a 33-yard touchdown pass to shorten the score 24–10. After the break, Gould kicked a 32-yard field goal increasing the Bears' lead to 27–10, but the Steelers answered with 13 straight points starting in the 3rd heading into the 4th quarter as Suisham nailed a 36-yard field goal for a 14-point deficit (27–13) and then a 21-yard pass to Brown from Roethlisberger again, shortening the lead to 7 at 27–20. In the 4th quarter, the Steelers came within 4 points as Suisham nailed a 44-yard field goal to make the score 27–23. However, the Bears were able to seal the victory with Jay Cutler's 17-yard pass to Earl Bennett for a score of 34–23 and then Julius Peppers' 42-yard fumble return for a touchdown (with a failed PAT) for a final score of 40–23.

With the loss, the Steelers started a season 0–3 for the first time since 2000. With the Browns winning earlier in the day, the team was left in last in the AFC North.

==== Week 4: at Minnesota Vikings ====
NFL International Series

Week Four: Pittsburgh Steelers at Minnesota Vikings – Game summary

| Quarter | 1 | 2 | 3 | 4 | Total |
|---|---|---|---|---|---|
| Steelers | 7 | 3 | 7 | 10 | **27** |
| **Vikings** | 10 | 10 | 14 | 0 | **34** |

at Wembley Stadium, London, England

- Date: September 29
- Game time: 6:00 p.m. BST/1:00 pm. EDT
- Game weather: 54 °F (12 °C), partly cloudy
- Game attendance: 83,518
- Referee: Clete Blakeman
- TV announcers (CBS): Jim Nantz and Phil Simms
- Recap, Game book

Game information

**First quarter**

- MIN – Blair Walsh 54-yard field goal, 12:08. Vikings 3–0. **Drive: 9 plays, 47 yards, 2:52.**
- MIN – Greg Jennings 70-yard pass from Matt Cassel (Blair Walsh kick), 8:06. Vikings 10–0. **Drive: 3 plays, 76 yards, 0:56.**
- PIT – Le'Veon Bell 8-yard run (Shaun Suisham kick), 4:02. Vikings 10–7. **Drive: 8 plays, 75 yards, 4:04.**

**Second quarter**

- MIN – Adrian Peterson 60-yard run (Blair Walsh kick), 12:42. Vikings 17–7. **Drive: 1 play, 60 yards, 0:10.**
- PIT – Shaun Suisham 26-yard field goal, 3:39. Vikings 17–10. **Drive: 15 plays, 78 yards, 9:03.**
- MIN – Blair Walsh 37-yard field goal, 0:39. Vikings 20–10. **Drive: 8 plays, 47 yards, 3:00.**

**Third quarter**

- PIT – Le'Veon Bell 1-yard run (Shaun Suisham kick), 11:28. Vikings 20–17. **Drive: 6 plays, 80 yards, 3:32.**
- MIN – Adrian Peterson 7-yard run (Blair Walsh kick), 7:52. Vikings 27–17. **Drive: 6 plays, 75 yards, 3:36.**
- MIN – Greg Jennings 16-yard pass from Matt Cassel (Blair Walsh kick), 5:11. Vikings 34–17. **Drive: 2 plays, 37 yards, 0:27.**

**Fourth quarter**

- PIT – Jerricho Cotchery 15-yard pass from Ben Roethlisberger (Shaun Suisham kick), 12:42. Vikings 34–24. **Drive: 9 plays, 77 yards, 3:13.**
- PIT – Shaun Suisham 28-yard field goal, 3:37. Vikings 34–27. **Drive: 9 plays, 54 yards, 3:12.**

**Top passers**

- PIT – Ben Roethlisberger – 36/51, 383 yards, TD, INT
- MIN – Matt Cassel – 16/25, 248 yards, 2 TD

**Top rushers**

- PIT – Le'Veon Bell – 16 rushes, 57 yards, 2 TD
- MIN – Adrian Peterson – 23 rushes, 140 yards, 2 TD

**Top receivers**

- PIT – Jerrico Cotchery – 5 receptions, 103 yards, TD
- MIN – Jerome Simpson – 7 receptions, 124 yards

The Steelers traveled to London, England and were considered the visitor team against a Matt Cassel-led Vikings team. The Vikes got off to a fast start as Blair Walsh nailed a 54-yard field goal for a 3–0 lead followed up by Matt Cassel hooking up with Greg Jennings on a 70-yard touchdown pass for a 10–0 lead. The Steelers managed to get on the board later on in the first quarter when rookie RB Le'Veon Bell ran for an 8-yard touchdown to make the game 10–7. The Vikes moved ahead by double digits in the second quarter as Adrian Peterson ran for a 60-yard touchdown for a 17–7 lead. Shaun Suisham got the Steelers within a touchdown by nailing a 26-yard field goal for a 17–10 lead. Walsh moved the Vikes ahead by 10 at halftime by kicking a 37-yard field goal for a 20–10 lead. The Steelers came within 3 as Le'Veon Bell ran for a 1-yard touchdown shortening the lead to 20–17 but the Vikes managed to move ahead 27–17 after Peterson ran for a 7-yard touchdown and then Cassel found Jennings again on a 16-yard touchdown pass to make the lead 34–17. In the 4th quarter, Jerricho Cotchery hooked up with Ben Roethlisberger on a 15-yard touchdown pass for a 34–24 lead, and then tried to rally as Suisham nailed a 28-yard field goal. The Steelers' comeback attempt was ruined again as Roethlisberger was sacked and fumbled the ball with less than a minute left in the game, sealing the victory for the Vikes.

With this loss, the Steelers are off to their worst start since the AFL–NFL merger. They had last started 0–4 in 1968, when they started 0–6. This is also the first time since 2006 in which the team would fall to 4 games below .500 when they started that season 2–6.

==== Week 6: at New York Jets ====
Week Six: Pittsburgh Steelers at New York Jets – Game summary

| Quarter | 1 | 2 | 3 | 4 | Total |
|---|---|---|---|---|---|
| **Steelers** | 0 | 9 | 7 | 3 | **19** |
| Jets | 3 | 3 | 0 | 0 | **6** |

at MetLife Stadium, East Rutherford, New Jersey

- Date: October 13
- Game time: 1:00 pm. EDT
- Game weather: 62 °F (17 °C), cloudy
- Game attendance: 76,957
- Referee: Terry McAulay
- TV announcers (CBS): Jim Nantz, Phil Simms and Bill Cowher
- Recap, Game book

Game information

**First quarter**

- NYJ – Nick Folk 25-yard field goal, 3:25. Jets 3–0. **Drive: 9 plays, 38 yards, 5:39.**

**Second quarter**

- PIT – Shaun Suisham 46-yard field goal, 12:07. Tied 3–3. **Drive: 10 plays, 52 yards, 6:18.**
- PIT – Shaun Suisham 33-yard field goal, 5:25. Steelers 6–3. **Drive: 9 plays, 67 yards, 4:43.**
- PIT – Shaun Suisham 48-yard field goal, 0:45. Steelers 9–3. **Drive: 8 plays, 35 yards, 3:18.**
- NYJ – Nick Folk 39-yard field goal, 0:02. Steelers 9–6. **Drive: 7 plays, 51 yards, 0:43.**

**Third quarter**

- PIT – Emmanuel Sanders 55-yard pass from Ben Roethlisberger (Shaun Suisham kick), 12:30. Steelers 16–6. **Drive: 3 plays, 64 yards, 1:31.**

**Fourth quarter**

- PIT – Shaun Suisham 32-yard field goal, 12:09. Steelers 19–6. **Drive: 12 plays, 65 yards, 7:02.**

**Top passers**

- PIT – Ben Roethlisberger – 23/30, 264 yards, TD
- NYJ – Geno Smith – 19/34, 201 yards, 2 INT

**Top rushers**

- PIT – Le'Veon Bell – 16 rushes, 34 yards
- NYJ – Bilal Powell – 9 rushes, 30 yards

**Top receivers**

- PIT – Antonio Brown – 9 receptions, 86 yards
- NYJ – Jeff Cumberland – 4 receptions, 59 yards

Coming off of their bye week, the Steelers traveled to East Rutherford, NJ to take on the Jets. The Jets scored first in the first quarter when Nick Folk scored a 25-yard field goal for a 3–0 lead for the only score of that period. The Steelers managed to tie it at first in the 2nd quarter followed by taking the lead with 2 other field goals as Suisham kicked field goals from 46, 33, and 48 yards out for scores of 3–3, 6–3, and 9–3 respectively. The Jets tried to rally as Folk nailed a 39-yard field goal for a 9–6 score at halftime. In the 2nd half, it was all Steelers as they pulled away when Ben Roethlisberger found Emmanuel Sanders on a 55-yard touchdown pass for a 16–6 lead in the 3rd quarter which was then followed up by Suisham's 32-yard field goal in the 4th quarter for a final score of 19–6.

With the win, the Steelers improved to 1–4.

==== Week 7: vs. Baltimore Ravens ====
Week Seven: Baltimore Ravens at Pittsburgh Steelers – Game summary

| Quarter | 1 | 2 | 3 | 4 | Total |
|---|---|---|---|---|---|
| Ravens | 3 | 3 | 0 | 10 | **16** |
| **Steelers** | 7 | 3 | 3 | 6 | **19** |

at Heinz Field, Pittsburgh, Pennsylvania

- Date: October 20
- Game time: 4:25 pm. EDT
- Game weather: 54 °F (12 °C), (Sunny)
- Game attendance: 62,295
- Referee: Bill Leavy
- TV announcers (CBS): Ian Eagle and Dan Fouts
- Recap, Game book

Game information

**First quarter**

- PIT – Heath Miller 3-yard pass from Ben Roethlisberger (Shaun Suisham kick), 5:24. Steelers 7–0. **Drive: 10 plays, 60 yards, 6:05.**
- BAL – Justin Tucker 46-yard field goal, 0:05. Steelers 7–3. **Drive: 10 plays, 49 yards, 5:19.**

**Second quarter**

- PIT – Shaun Suisham 34-yard field goal, 9:59. Steelers 10–3. **Drive: 9 plays, 44 yards, 5:06.**
- BAL – Justin Tucker 38-yard field goal, 0:08. Steelers 10–6. **Drive: 5 plays, 18 yards, 0:31.**

**Third quarter**

- PIT – Shaun Suisham 28-yard field goal, 2:56. Steelers 13–6. **Drive: 13 plays, 70 yards, 8:03.**

**Fourth quarter**

- BAL – Justin Tucker 32-yard field goal, 13:04. Steelers 13–9. **Drive: 12 plays, 66 yards, 4:52.**
- PIT – Shaun Suisham 38-yard field goa, 9:59. Steelers 16–9. **Drive: 6 plays, 18 yards, 3:05.**
- BAL – Dallas Clark 1-yard pass from Joe Flacco (Justin Tucker kick), 1:58. Tied 16–16. **Drive: 16 plays, 73 yards, 8:01.**
- PIT – Shaun Suisham 42-yard field goal, 0:00. Steelers 19–16. **Drive: 7 plays, 39 yards, 1:58.**

**Top passers**

- BAL – Joe Flacco – 24/34, 215 yards, TD
- PIT – Ben Roethlisberger – 17/23, 160 yards, TD

**Top rushers**

- BAL – Ray Rice – 15 rushes, 45 yards
- PIT – Le'Veon Bell – 19 rushes, 93 yards

**Top receivers**

- BAL – Torrey Smith – 3 receptions, 61 yards
- PIT – Antonio Brown – 6 receptions, 50 yards

After a road win, the Steelers returned home to take on the Ravens. The Steelers scored first in the first quarter as Ben Roethlisberger hooked up with Heath Miller on a 3-yard touchdown pass making the score 7–0. Justin Tucker then got the Ravens on the board after nailing a 36-yard field goal shortening the lead to 7–3. In the 2nd quarter, the Steelers moved ahead by a touchdown as Shaun Suisham nailed a 34-yard field goal to make the score 10–3. The Ravens moved within 4 as Tucker nailed a 38-yard field goal for a 10–6 game at halftime with the Steelers leading. After the break, the Steelers went back to work in the 3rd quarter as Suisham kicked a 28-yard field goal for a 13–6 lead. The Ravens drew within 4 points again in the fourth quarter as Tucker kicked a 32-yard field goal for a 13–9 score. Again, the Steelers retaliated and moved ahead by 7 points as Suisham kicked a 38-yard field goal for a 16–9 lead. However, Joe Flacco was able to find Dallas Clark on a 1-yard touchdown pass tying the game at 16–16. The Steelers managed to drive down the field for the game-winning field goal as Suisham nailed it from 42 yards out for a final score of 19–16 sending the Steelers to a 2–4 start.

==== Week 8: at Oakland Raiders ====
Week Eight: Pittsburgh Steelers at Oakland Raiders – Game summary

| Quarter | 1 | 2 | 3 | 4 | Total |
|---|---|---|---|---|---|
| Steelers | 0 | 3 | 0 | 15 | **18** |
| **Raiders** | 14 | 7 | 0 | 0 | **21** |

at O.co Coliseum, Oakland, California

- Date: October 27
- Game time: 4:05 pm. EDT/1:05 p.m. PDT
- Game weather: 56 °F (13 °C), overcast skies
- Game attendance: 52,950
- Referee: John Parry
- TV announcers (CBS): Spero Dedes and Rich Gannon
- Recap, Game book

Game information

**First quarter**

- OAK – Terrelle Pryor 93-yard run (Sebastian Janikowski kick), 14:41. Raiders 7–0. **Drive: 1 play, 93 yards, 0:19.**
- OAK – Darren McFadden 7-yard run (Sebastian Janikowski kick), 7:28. Raiders 14–0. **Drive: 5 plays, 26 yards, 2:36.**

**Second quarter**

- PIT – Shaun Suisham 47-yard field goal, 14:14. Raiders 14–3. **Drive: 5 plays, 19 yards, 2:44.**
- OAK – Darren McFadden 4-yard run (Sebastian Janikowski kick), 1:55. Raiders 21–3. **Drive: 11 plays, 72 yards, 6:05.**

**Third quarter**

- No scoring plays.

**Fourth quarter**

- PIT – Emmanuel Sanders 9-yard pass from Ben Roethlisberger (Shaun Suisham kick), 12:11. Raiders 21–10. **Drive: 3 plays, 11 yards, 0:55.**
- PIT – Le'Veon Bell 2-yard run (Emmanuel Sanders run), 1:24. Raiders 21–18. **Drive: 12 plays, 83 yards, 2:55.**

**Top passers**

- PIT – Ben Roethlisberger – 29/45, 275 yards, TD, 2 INT
- OAK – Terrelle Pryor – 10/19, 88 yards, 2 INT

**Top rushers**

- PIT – Le'Veon Bell – 13 rushes, 24 yards, TD
- OAK – Terrelle Pryor – 9 rushes, 106 yards, TD

**Top receivers**

- PIT – Emmanuel Sanders – 7 receptions, 88 yards, TD
- OAK – Rod Streater – 4 receptions, 45 yards

After winning at home against the Ravens, the Steelers traveled to Oakland to take on the Raiders. The Raiders got off to a fast start in the 1st quarter when Terrelle Pryor ran for a 93-yard touchdown to take a 7–0 lead. This remains the longest touchdown run by any QB in NFL history. Darren McFadden ran into the end zone for a 7-yard touchdown run to make the score 14–0. The Steelers managed to get on the board in the 2nd quarter when Shaun Suisham nailed a 47-yard field goal for a 14–3 deficit. But the Raiders moved ahead as McFadden ran for another touchdown from 4 yards out for a 21–3 score at halftime. After a scoreless 3rd quarter, the Steelers went back to work in the 4th quarter as Ben Roethlisberger found Emmanuel Sanders on a 9-yard touchdown pass to make the score 21–10 and then Le'Veon Bell ran for a 4-yard touchdown with the successful 2-point conversion to make the final score 21–18 as their comeback attempt again was cut short and the team fell to 2–5. On a positive note, they had won 2 out of their last 3 games coming off their bye week.

==== Week 9: at New England Patriots ====
Week Nine: Pittsburgh Steelers at New England Patriots – Game summary

| Quarter | 1 | 2 | 3 | 4 | Total |
|---|---|---|---|---|---|
| Steelers | 0 | 10 | 14 | 7 | **31** |
| **Patriots** | 7 | 17 | 3 | 28 | **55** |

at Gillette Stadium, Foxborough, Massachusetts

- Date: November 3
- Game time: 4:25 pm. EST
- Game weather: 44 °F (7 °C), partly cloudy, cool and windy
- Game attendance: 68,756
- Referee: Walt Coleman
- TV announcers (CBS): Jim Nantz and Phil Simms
- Recap, Gamebook

Game information

**First quarter**

- NE – Danny Amendola 34-yard pass from Tom Brady (Stephen Gostkowski kick), 4:00. Patriots 7–0. **Drive: 1 play, 34 yards, 0:06.**

**Second quarter**

- NE – Rob Gronkowski 19-yard pass from Tom Brady (Stephen Gostkowski kick), 10:30. Patriots 14–0. **Drive: 6 plays, 67 yards, 2:06.**
- PIT – Shaun Suisham 30-yard field goal, 7:36. Patriots 14–3. **Drive: 7 plays, 68 yards, 2:54.**
- NE – Stephen Gostkowski 20-yard field goal, 3:51. Patriots 17–3. **Drive: 8 plays, 77 yards, 3:45.**
- PIT – Antonio Brown 27-yard pass from Ben Roethlisberger (Shaun Suisham kick), 1:55. Patriots 17–10. **Drive: 4 plays, 71 yards, 1:56.**
- NE – Stevan Ridley 1-yard run (Stephen Gostkowski kick), 0:10. Patriots 24–10. **Drive: 9 plays, 77 yards, 1:45.**

**Third quarter**

- PIT – Jerricho Cotchery 20-yard pass from Ben Roethlisberger (Shaun Suisham kick), 11:02. Patriots 24–17. **Drive: 5 plays, 36 yards, 1:54.**
- PIT – Jerrico Cotchery 8-yard pass from Ben Roethlisberger (Shaun Suisham kick), 7:10. Tied 24–24. **Drive: 5 plays, 46 yards, 2:18.**
- NE – Stephen Gostkowski 32-yard field goal, 2:39. Patriots 27–24. **Drive: 11 plays, 60 yards, 4:31.**

**Fourth quarter**

- NE – Aaron Dobson 17-yard pass from Tom Brady (Stephen Gostkowski kick), 13:46. Patriots 34–24. **Drive: 5 plays, 34 yards, 1:38.**
- NE – Stevan Ridley 5-yard run (Stephen Gostkowski kick), 9:16. Patriots 41–24. **Drive: 8 plays, 61 yards, 3:28.**
- PIT – Jerricho Cotchery 6-yard pass from Ben Roethlisberger (Shaun Suisham kick), 6:15. Patriots 41–31. **Drive: 10 plays, 80 yards, 3:01.**
- NE – Aaron Dobson 81-yard pass from Tom Brady (Stephen Gostkowski kick), 5:15. Patriots 48–31. **Drive: 2 plays, 93 yards, 1:00.**
- NE – LeGarrette Blount 5-yard run (Stephen Gostkowski kick), 2:41. Patriots 55–31. **Drive: 2 plays, 28 yards, 0:38.**

**Top passers**

- PIT – Ben Roethlisberger – 28/48, 400 yards, 4 TD, 2 INT
- NE – Tom Brady – 23/33, 432 yards, 4 TD

**Top rushers**

- PIT – Le'Veon Bell – 16 rushes, 74 yards
- NE – Stevan Ridley – 26 rushes, 115 yards, 2 TD

**Top receivers**

- PIT – Emmanuel Sanders – 6 receptions, 98 yards
- NE – Rob Gronkowski – 9 receptions, 143 yards, TD

After a tough loss to the Raiders, the Steelers traveled to Foxborough to take on the Patriots. The Patriots scored first when Danny Amendola caught a 34-yard TD pass from Tom Brady to make the score 7–0. In the 2nd quarter, the Patriots increased their lead as Brady found Rob Gronkowski on a 19-yard pass to make the score 14–0. The Steelers finally got on the board when Shaun Suisham kicked a 30-yard field goal to make it 14–3, but the Pats went ahead by 2 touchdowns again as Stephen Gostkowski nailed a field goal from 20 yards out making the score 17–3. Ben Roethlisberger regardless was able to find Antonio Brown for his 200th career TD pass, a 27-yarder to come behind by 7, 17–10. But the Pats pulled away as Stevan Ridley ran for a 1-yard TD to make it 24–10 at halftime. In the 3rd quarter, Roethlisberger found Cotchery again on a 20-yard pass cutting the lead to 24–17 and again on an 8-yard pass tying the game at 24. However, the Patriots pulled away again as Gostkowski kicked a 32-yard field goal to make the score 27–24. They continued to dominate in the 4th quarter scoring a total of 17 straight points as Brady found Aaron Dobson on a 17-yard pass to make the score 34–24 and Ridley again ran for another TD from 5-yards out making the score 41–24. Roethlisberger and Cotchery hooked up again on a 6-yard pass to shorten the lead to 41–31, however the Patriots were able to pull away as Brady found Dobson again on an 81-yard pass to make the score 48–31 and ended it with LeGarrette Blount's 5-yard run making the final score 55–31.

With the loss, the Steelers dropped to 2–6, the team's first such start since 2006. It may also be noted that since 2006 whenever the team has been below .500 in a season, they would eventually finish with 8 wins or more, but at the same time, miss out on the playoffs. Also, the 55 points are the most points ever scored against the Steelers as the Patriots became the first team to score 50+ points against the team since the Bills' victory of 52–34 in 1991.

==== Week 10: vs. Buffalo Bills ====
Week Ten: Buffalo Bills at Pittsburgh Steelers – Game summary

| Quarter | 1 | 2 | 3 | 4 | Total |
|---|---|---|---|---|---|
| Bills | 3 | 0 | 0 | 7 | **10** |
| **Steelers** | 0 | 10 | 7 | 6 | **23** |

at Heinz Field, Pittsburgh, Pennsylvania

- Date: November 10
- Game time: 1:00 pm. EST
- Game weather: 44 °F (7 °C), (Cloudy)
- Game attendance: 60,406
- Referee: Scott Green
- TV announcers (CBS): Marv Albert and Rich Gannon
- Recap, Game book

Game information

**First quarter**

- BUF – Dan Carpenter 20-yard field goal, 6:16. Bills 3–0. **Drive: 9 plays, 28 yards, 3:59.**

**Second quarter**

- PIT – Shaun Suisham 36-yard field goal, 8:47. Tied 3–3. **Drive: 13 plays, 58 yards, 6:46.**
- PIT – Jerricho Cotchery 5-yard pass from Ben Roethlisberger (Shaun Suisham kick), 1:55. Steelers 10–3. **Drive: 9 plays, 86 yards, 4:48.**

**Third quarter**

- PIT – Le'Veon Bell 4-yard run (Shaun Suisham kick), 3:02. Steelers 17–3. **Drive: 6 plays, 58 yards, 3:03.**

**Fourth quarter**

- PIT – Shaun Suisham 37-yard field goal, 8:00. Steelers 20–3. **Drive: 4 plays, -5 yards, 1:31.**
- PIT – Shaun Suisham 23-yard field goal, 4:34. Steelers 23–3. **Drive: 4 plays, 6 yards, 1:36.**
- BUF – Chris Gragg 2-yard pass from EJ Manuel (Dan Carpenter kick), 0:03. Steelers 23–10. **Drive: 15 plays, 80 yards, 4:31.**

**Top passers**

- BUF – EJ Manuel – 22/39, 155 yards, TD, INT
- PIT – Ben Roethlisberger – 18/30, 204 yards, TD, INT

**Top rushers**

- BUF – Fred Jackson – 12 rushes, 55 yards
- PIT – Le'Veon Bell – 22 rushes, 57 yards, TD

**Top receivers**

- BUF – Stevie Johnson – 3 receptions, 48 yards
- PIT – Antonio Brown – 6 receptions, 104 yards

After a tough road loss to the Patriots, the Steelers traveled home to take on the Bills. The Bills scored first in the first quarter when Dan Carpenter nailed a 20-yard field goal for a 3–0 lead and the only score of the quarter. The Steelers however, responded by doing it big starting off in the 2nd quarter tying the game at 3 when Shaun Suisham nailed a 36-yard field goal. They would increase their lead as Ben Roethlisberger found Jerricho Cotchery on a 5-yard TD pass giving them a 10–3 halftime lead. After the break, the Steelers went back to work as Le'Veon Bell ran for a 4-yard TD increasing their lead to 17–3. They followed up in the 4th quarter with 2 Suisham field goals from 37 and 23 yards out for a lead of 20–3 and then 23–3 respectively. The Bills finally managed to score a TD in the final seconds of the game when EJ Manuel found Chris Gragg on a 2-yard pass, making the final score 23–10, sealing the win for the Steelers, who improved themselves to 3–6.

==== Week 11: vs. Detroit Lions ====
Week Eleven: Detroit Lions at Pittsburgh Steelers – Game summary

| Quarter | 1 | 2 | 3 | 4 | Total |
|---|---|---|---|---|---|
| Lions | 0 | 27 | 0 | 0 | **27** |
| **Steelers** | 14 | 6 | 3 | 14 | **37** |

at Heinz Field, Pittsburgh, Pennsylvania

- Date: November 17
- Game time: 1:00 pm. EST
- Game weather: 61 °F (16 °C), (Rain)
- Game attendance: 57,905
- Referee: Walt Anderson
- TV announcers (Fox): Thom Brennaman, Brian Billick and Laura Okmin
- Recap, Game book

Game information

**First quarter**

- PIT – Antonio Brown 34-yard pass from Ben Roethlisberger (Shaun Suisham kick), 6:20. Steelers 7–0. **Drive: 8 plays, 68 yards, 3:58.**
- PIT – Antonio Brown 47-yard pass from Ben Roethlisberger (Shaun Suisham kick), 3:58. Steelers 14–0. **Drive: 4 plays, 63 yards, 1:19.**

**Second quarter**

- DET – David Akers 35-yard field goal, 14:05. Steelers 14–3. **Drive: 10 plays, 50 yards, 4:53.**
- PIT – Shaun Suisham 25-yard field goal, 10:31. Steelers 17–3. **Drive: 7 plays, 25 yards, 2:00.**
- DET – Calvin Johnson 79-yard pass from Matthew Stafford (David Akers kick), 10:13. Steelers 17–10. **Drive: 1 play, 79 yards, 0:18.**
- PIT – Shaun Suisham 34-yard field goal, 7:19. Steelers 20–10. **Drive: 7 plays, 64 yards, 2:54.**
- DET – Calvin Johnson 19-yard pass from Matthew Stafford (David Akers kick), 3:52. Steelers 20–17. **Drive: 5 plays, 74 yards, 3:27.**
- DET – Joique Bell 2-yard run (David Akers kick), 1:42. Lions 24–20. **Drive: 5 plays, 62 yards, 0:49.**
- DET – David Akers 19-yard field goal, 0:04. Lions 27–20. **Drive: 10 plays, 50 yards, 0:58.**

**Third quarter**

- PIT – Shaun Suisham 21-yard field goal, 5:14. Lions 27–23. **Drive: 10 plays, 42 yards, 5:11.**

**Fourth quarter**

- PIT – Will Johnson 1-yard pass from Ben Roethlisberger (Shaun Suisham kick), 4:46. Steelers 30–27. **Drive: 16 plays, 97 yards, 8:03.**
- PIT – Jerricho Cotchery 20-yard pass from Ben Roethlisberger (Shaun Suisham kick), 2:29. Steelers 37–27. **Drive: 5 plays, 34 yards, 1:42.**

**Top passers**

- DET – Matthew Stafford – 19/46, 362 yards, 2 TD, INT
- PIT – Ben Roethlisberger – 29/45, 367 yards, 4 TD

**Top rushers**

- DET – Joique Bell – 9 rushes, 49 yards
- PIT – Le'Veon Bell – 18 rushes, 36 yards

**Top receivers**

- DET – Calvin Johnson – 6 receptions, 179 yards, 2 TD
- PIT – Antonio Brown – 7 receptions, 147 yards, 2 TD

After defeating the Bills, the Steelers stayed home to take on the visiting Lions. They started off scoring in the 1st quarter as Ben Roethlisberger found Antonio Brown on 2 consecutive TD passes from 34 and 47 yards out for leads of 7–0 and then 14–0. The Lions were able to get on the board as David Akers nailed a 35-yard field goal to make the score 14–3. The Steelers managed to pull away by 2 touchdowns as Shaun Suisham nailed a 25-yard field goal for a 17–3 lead. The Lions drew closer as Matthew Stafford found Calvin Johnson on a 79-yard TD pass shortening the lead to 17–10 not long before Suisham nailed a 34-yard field goal to make the score 20–10. Just then, the Lions managed to take the lead scoring 17 straight points when Stafford found Calvin Johnson again on a 19-yard pass making the score 20–17 and with the Lions taking the lead as Joique Bell ran for a 4-yard TD moving them ahead 24–20 and then finally wrapped things up in the first half as Akers nailed a 19-yard field goal to take a 27–20 lead at halftime. After the break, the Steelers got back to work as Suisham nailed a 21-yard field goal to shorten the Lions' lead to 27–23. They took the lead in the 4th quarter as Roethlisberger found Will Johnson on a 1-yard pass making the score 30–27. After a failed fake field goal attempt by the Lions, the Steelers set the ball up at their own 3-yard line. Due to a huge penalty against the team, the Steelers were able to move further down the field and seal the win for themselves as Roethlisberger found Jerricho Cotchery on a 20-yard pass for a final score of 37–27.

With the win, the Steelers improved to 4–6.

==== Week 12: at Cleveland Browns ====
Week Twelve: Pittsburgh Steelers at Cleveland Browns – Game summary

| Quarter | 1 | 2 | 3 | 4 | Total |
|---|---|---|---|---|---|
| **Steelers** | 3 | 10 | 7 | 7 | **27** |
| Browns | 3 | 0 | 0 | 8 | **11** |

at FirstEnergy Stadium, Cleveland, Ohio

- Date: November 24
- Game time: 1:00 pm. EST
- Game weather: 20 °F (−7 °C), cold, snow
- Game attendance: 71,513
- Referee: Terry McAulay
- TV announcers (CBS): Kevin Harlan and Solomon Wilcots
- Recap, Game book

Game information

**First quarter**

- PIT – Shaun Suisham 47-yard field goal, 10:03. Steelers 3–0. **Drive: 9 plays, 45 yards, 4:57.**
- CLE – Billy Cundiff 49-yard field goal, 7:21. Tied 3–3. **Drive: 7 plays, 34 yards, 2:42.**

**Second quarter**

- PIT – Antonio Brown 41-yard pass from Ben Roethlisberger (Shaun Suisham kick), 2:33. Steelers 10–3. **Drive: 2 plays, 52 yards, 0:44.**
- PIT – Shaun Suisham 32-yard field goal, 0:07. Steelers 13–3. **Drive: 8 plays, 40 yards, 1:36.**

**Third quarter**

- PIT – Emmanuel Sanders 4-yard pass from Ben Roethlisberger (Shaun Suisham kick), 7:43. Steelers 20–3. **Drive: 1 play, 4 yards, 0:03.**

**Fourth quarter**

- PIT – Willie Gay 21-yard interception return (Shaun Suisham kick), 4:27. Steelers 27–3.
- CLE – Josh Gordon 1-yard pass from Brandon Weeden (Brandon Weeden-Davone Bess pass), 3:13. Steelers 27–11. **Drive: 6 plays, 78 yards, 1:14.**

**Top passers**

- PIT – Ben Roethlisberger – 22/34, 217 yards, 2 TD
- CLE – Brandon Weeden – 13/30, 209 yards, TD, INT

**Top rushers**

- PIT – Le'Veon Bell – 23 rushes, 80 yards
- CLE – Chris Ogbonnaya – 4 rushes, 26 yards

**Top receivers**

- PIT – Antonio Brown – 6 receptions, 92 yards, TD
- CLE – Josh Gordon – 14 receptions, 237 yards, TD

After a win over the Lions, the Steelers traveled to Cleveland to take on the Browns. They drew first blood as Shaun Suisham nailed a field goal from 47 yards out to take a 3–0 lead. The Browns managed to tie the game as Billy Cundiff helped them tie it at 3–3 in the first quarter. In the 2nd quarter, the Steelers moved back into the lead scoring 24 unanswered points in the process. Ben Roethlisberger found Antonio Brown on a 41-yard touchdown pass to make the score 10–3 followed by another Suisham field goal this time from 32 yards out to make the score 13–3 at halftime. In the 3rd quarter, Roethlisberger found Emmanuel Sanders on a 4-yard touchdown pass increasing their lead to 20–3 followed by William Gay who picked off Brandon Weeden and returned it 21 yards for a touchdown making the score 27–3. The Browns would score a touchdown of their own as Weeden found Josh Gordon on a 1-yard touchdown pass followed by a successful 2-point conversion pass to Davone Bess to make the final score 27–11 as the Steelers improved to 5–6 winning 3 straight and taking their trend to winning 5 out of their last 7.

==== Week 13: at Baltimore Ravens ====
Thanksgiving Day game

Week Thirteen: Pittsburgh Steelers at Baltimore Ravens – Game summary

| Quarter | 1 | 2 | 3 | 4 | Total |
|---|---|---|---|---|---|
| Steelers | 0 | 0 | 7 | 13 | **20** |
| **Ravens** | 7 | 3 | 6 | 6 | **22** |

at M&T Bank Stadium, Baltimore, Maryland

- Date: November 28
- Game time: 8:30 pm. EST
- Game weather: 37 °F (3 °C), clear
- Game attendance: 71,005
- Referee: Clete Blakeman
- TV announcers (NBC): Al Michaels, Cris Collinsworth and Michele Tafoya
- Recap, Game book

Game information

**First quarter**

- BAL – Torrey Smith 7-yard pass from Joe Flacco (Justin Tucker kick), 9:18. Ravens 7–0. **Drive: 8 plays, 71 yards, 3:06.**

**Second quarter**

- BAL – Justin Tucker 43-yard field goal, 3:01. Ravens 10–0. **Drive: 9 plays, 31 yards, 4:18.**

**Third quarter**

- BAL – Justin Tucker 34-yard field goal, 9:21. Ravens 13–0. **Drive: 13 plays, 52 yards, 5:39.**
- PIT – Emmanuel Sanders 8-yard pass from Ben Roethlisberger 6:26. Ravens 13–7. **Drive: 7 plays, 80 yards, 2:55.**
- BAL – Justin Tucker 38-yard field goal, 3:49. Ravens 16–7. **Drive: 5 plays, 7 yards, 2:37.**

**Fourth quarter**

- BAL – Justin Tucker 45-yard field goal, 13:59. Ravens 19–7. **Drive: 7 plays, 37 yards, 3:00.**
- PIT – Le'Veon Bell 1-yard run (Shaun Suisham kick), 9:32. Ravens 19–14. **Drive: 10 plays, 60 yards, 4:27.**
- BAL – Justin Tucker 48-yard field goal, 5:37. Ravens 22–14. **Drive: 7 plays, 36 yards, 3:55.**
- PIT – Jerricho Cotchery 1-yard pass from Ben Roethlisberger (pass failed), 1:03. Ravens 22–20. **Drive: 13 plays, 79 yards, 4:34.**

**Top passers**

- PIT – Ben Roethlisberger – 28/44, 257 yards, 2 TD
- BAL – Joe Flacco – 24/35, 251 yards, TD

**Top rushers**

- PIT – Le'Veon Bell – 16 rushes, 73 yards, TD
- BAL – Bernard Pierce – 9 rushes, 35 yards

**Top receivers**

- PIT – Heath Miller – 8 receptions, 86 yards
- BAL – Torrey Smith – 6 receptions, 93 yards, TD

After a win at Cleveland, the Steelers traveled to Baltimore to take on the Ravens in what would be the Thanksgiving Primetime Game and of course their first game on Thanksgiving Day since 1998. The Ravens drew first blood as Joe Flacco found Torrey Smith on a 7-yard pass to make the score 7–0 in the first quarter. In then 2nd quarter, Justin Tucker nailed a 43-yard field goal for a 10–0 halftime lead. After the break, the Ravens went back to work in the 3rd quarter as Tucker nailed a 34-yard field goal for a 13–0 lead. The Steelers finally got on the board as Ben Roethlisberger found Emmanuel Sanders on an 8-yard touchdown pass for a 13–7 score. On the ensuing kick-off, Mike Tomlin was standing just off the field along the Steelers' sideline as Baltimore's Jacoby Jones broke free on the return for a potential game breaking touchdown. Tomlin, with his back to the approaching play, appeared to glance over his shoulder then place his foot briefly onto the field as he jumped out of the way, causing Jones to veer inside where he was tackled. Several Ravens players claimed Tomlin had intentionally interfered with Jones; if officials had agreed, a touchdown could have been awarded to the Ravens based on the palpably unfair act, no penalty was called. A week later the NFL fined Tomlin $100,000. The Ravens then pulled away as Tucker kicked yet another field goal putting his team ahead by 9, 16–7. In the 4th quarter, Tucker kicked yet another field goal this one from 45 yards out for a score of 19–7. The Steelers managed to draw within 5 points 19–14 when Le'Veon Bell ran for a 1-yard touchdown. Tucker then kicked a 48-yard field goal to make the score 22–14. The Steelers started their comeback attempt as Roethlisberger found Jerricho Cotchery on a 1-yard touchdown pass for a 22–20 score. After this, they tried the 2-point conversion to tie the game and send it into OT, but they would come up short and miss the conversion with 1:03 left in the game.

This dropped the team to 5–7 and 3rd place in the AFC North. Also they dropped to 2–5 on Thanksgiving.

==== Week 14: vs. Miami Dolphins ====
Week Fourteen: Miami Dolphins at Pittsburgh Steelers – Game summary

| Quarter | 1 | 2 | 3 | 4 | Total |
|---|---|---|---|---|---|
| **Dolphins** | 3 | 7 | 14 | 10 | **34** |
| Steelers | 7 | 0 | 14 | 7 | **28** |

at Heinz Field, Pittsburgh, Pennsylvania

- Date: December 8
- Game time: 1:00 pm. EST
- Game weather: 26 °F (−3 °C), (Light Snow)
- Game attendance: 52,489
- Referee: John Parry
- TV announcers (CBS): Ian Eagle and Dan Fouts
- Recap, Game book

Game information

**First quarter**

- PIT – Emmanuel Sanders 5-yard pass from Ben Roethlisberger (Shaun Suisham kick), 4:20. Steelers 7–0. **Drive: 12 plays, 74 yards, 7:05.**
- MIA – Caleb Sturgis 30-yard field goal, 0:40. Steelers 7–3. **Drive: 8 plays, 64 yards, 3:40.**

**Second quarter**

- MIA – Charles Clay 6-yard pass from Ryan Tannehill (Caleb Sturgis kick), 8:15. Dolphins 10–7. **Drive: 5 plays, 31 yards, 2:29.**

**Third quarter**

- MIA – Daniel Thomas 4-yard run (Caleb Sturgis kick), 10:15. Dolphins 17–7. **Drive: 9 plays, 80 yards, 4:10.**
- PIT – Antonio Brown 43-yard pass from Ben Roethlisberger (Shaun Suisham kick), 8:58. Dolphins 17–14. **Drive: 4 plays, 83 yards, 1:52.**
- PIT – Troy Polamalu 19-yard interception return (Shaun Suisham kick), 8:05. Steelers 21–17.
- MIA – Brian Hartline 4-yard pass from Ryan Tannehill (Caleb Sturgis kick), 4:52. Dolphins 24–21. **Drive: 7 plays, 71 yards, 3:13.**

**Fourth quarter**

- PIT – Jerricho Cotchery 16-yard pass from Ben Roethlisberger (Shaun Suisham kick), 14:56. Steelers 28–24. **Drive: 11 plays, 78 yards, 4:56.**
- MIA – Charles Clay 12-yard pass from Ryan Tannehill (Caleb Sturgis kick), 2:53. Dolphins 31–28. **Drive: 4 plays, 80 yards, 1:38.**
- MIA – Caleb Sturgis 27-yard field goal, 1:08. Dolphins 34–28. **Drive: 4 plays, 0 yards, 1:15.**

**Top passers**

- MIA – Ryan Tannehill – 20/33, 200 yards, 3 TD, INT
- PIT – Ben Roethlisberger – 23/39, 349 yards, 3 TD

**Top rushers**

- MIA – Daniel Thomas – 16 rushes, 105 yards, TD
- PIT – Le'Veon Bell – 15 rushes, 61 yards

**Top receivers**

- MIA – Charles Clay – 7 receptions, 97 yards, 2 TD
- PIT – Antonio Brown – 5 receptions, 138 yards, TD

After a tough road loss to the Ravens, the Steelers went home for a game against the Dolphins. They would score first as Ben Roethlisberger found Emmanuel Sanders on a 5-yard pass for a 7–0 lead. The Dolphins managed to get on the board as Caleb Sturgis kicked a 30-yard field goal making the score 7–3. In the 2nd quarter, Charles Clay caught a 6-yard touchdown pass from Ryan Tannehill as the Phins took the lead 10–7 at halftime. After the break, the Dolphins went right back to work as Daniel Thomas ran for a 4-yard touchdown making the score 17–7. The Steelers then came within 3 when Roethlisberger found Antonio Brown on a 43-yard touchdown pass making the score 17–14 and would eventually score again when Troy Polamalu picked off Tannehill and returned it 19 yards for a touchdown as they retook the lead 21–17. The Dolphins however moved back into the lead as Tannehill found Brian Hartline on a 4-yard pass for a 24–21 score. In the 4th quarter, Roethlisberger found Jerricho Cotchery on a 16-yard touchdown pass as they moved ahead 28–24. Clay then caught a pass from Tannehill making the score 31–28 as the Dolphins retook the lead. They would stop scoring after Sturgis kicked a 27-yard field goal for a 34–28 lead. Under a minute to go in the quarter, the Steelers got the ball back with Roethlisberger throwing to Brown and then Brown running for what seemed to be the game-tying (and eventually game-winning touchdown and PAT), but officials reviewed the play and it was determined that Brown had stepped out of bounds during the run ending the game dropping the team to 5–8.

==== Week 15: vs. Cincinnati Bengals ====
Week Fifteen: Cincinnati Bengals at Pittsburgh Steelers – Game summary

| Quarter | 1 | 2 | 3 | 4 | Total |
|---|---|---|---|---|---|
| Bengals | 0 | 7 | 0 | 13 | **20** |
| **Steelers** | 21 | 6 | 3 | 0 | **30** |

at Heinz Field, Pittsburgh, Pennsylvania

- Date: December 15
- Game time: 8:30 pm. EST
- Game weather: 24 °F (−4 °C), (Cloudy)
- Game attendance: 45,873
- Referee: Ed Hochuli
- TV announcers (NBC): Al Michaels, Cris Collinsworth and Michele Tafoya
- Recap, Game book

Game information

**First quarter**

- PIT – Le'Veon Bell 1-yard run (Shaun Suisham kick), 9:58. Steelers 7–0. **Drive: 2 plays, 1 yard, 0:42.**
- PIT – Antonio Brown 12-yard pass from Ben Roethlisberger (Shaun Suisham kick), 2:16. Steelers 14–0. **Drive: 8 plays, 47 yards, 4:20.**
- PIT – Antonio Brown 67-yard punt return (Shaun Suisham kick), 1:12. Steelers 21–0.

**Second quarter**

- PIT – Shaun Suisham 25-yard field goal, 9:36. Steelers 24–0. **Drive: 11 plays, 60 yards, 4:55.**
- CIN – Giovani Bernard 1-yard run (Mike Nugent kick), 5:14. Steelers 24–7. **Drive: 9 plays, 47 yards, 4:22.**
- PIT – Shaun Suisham 45-yard field goal, 1:14. Steelers 27–7. **Drive: 10 plays, 46 yards, 4:00.**

**Third quarter**

- PIT – Shaun Suisham 26-yard field goal, 6:18. Steelers 30–7. **Drive: 9 plays, 55 yards, 4:19.**

**Fourth quarter**

- CIN – Tyler Eifert 1-yard pass from Andy Dalton (Mike Nugent kick), 14:09. Steelers 30–14. **Drive: 13 plays, 63 yards, 7:09.**
- CIN – Marvin Jones Jr. 13-yard pass from Andy Dalton (pass failed), 5:46. Steelers 30–20. **Drive: 10 plays, 75 yards, 4:26.**

**Top passers**

- CIN – Andy Dalton – 25/44, 230 yards, 2 TD
- PIT – Ben Roethlisberger – 20/25, 191 yards, TD, INT

**Top rushers**

- CIN – Giovani Bernard – 13 rushes, 33 yards, TD
- PIT – Le'Veon Bell – 24 rushes, 57 yards, TD

**Top receivers**

- CIN – A. J. Green – 9 receptions, 93 yards
- PIT – Antonio Brown – 5 receptions, 66 yards, TD

The Steelers stayed home for a SNF duel against longtime division rival Bengals. The first quarter was all Steelers as they scored touchdowns in 3 different ways: Le'Veon Bell ran for a 1-yard, Antonio Brown caught a 12-yard pass, and then returned a punt 67 yards putting up scores of 7–0, 14–0, and 21–0. This remains the most points in their franchise history they have scored in the first quarter while it remains the largest number of points the Bengals have allowed in the first quarter alone. This streak of points stood at 24 straight as Shaun Suisham kicked a 25-yard field goal. The Bengals finally got on the board as Gio Benard ran for a 1-yard touchdown making the score 24–7. Suisham then nailed a 45-yard field goal to move his team ahead 27–7 at halftime. After this, the Steelers went back to work in the 3rd quarter coming away with another field goal from 26 yards out for a 30–7 lead. The 4th quarter however, was all Bengals as Andy Dalton and Tyler Eifert connected on a 1-yard touchdown pass making the score 30–14 not long before Dalton found Marvin Jones on a 13-yard pass making the score 30–20, but the 2-point conversion failed as the Steelers would eventually win the game with that score as the final sending them to 6–8. Coupled with losses of the Ravens, Chargers, and Dolphins, the Steelers also remained in the playoff hunt.

==== Week 16: at Green Bay Packers ====
Week Sixteen: Pittsburgh Steelers at Green Bay Packers – Game summary

| Quarter | 1 | 2 | 3 | 4 | Total |
|---|---|---|---|---|---|
| **Steelers** | 7 | 3 | 21 | 7 | **38** |
| Packers | 7 | 7 | 7 | 10 | **31** |

at Lambeau Field, Green Bay, Wisconsin

- Date: December 22
- Game time: 4:25 pm. EST/3:25 p.m. CST
- Game weather: 23 °F (−5 °C), snow
- Game attendance: 77,999
- Referee: Carl Cheffers
- TV announcers (CBS): Kevin Harlan and Solomon Wilcots
- Recap, Game book

Game information

**First quarter**

- GB – Jarrett Boykin 5-yard pass from Matt Flynn (Mason Crosby kick), 4:02. Packers 7–0. **Drive: 13 plays, 87 yards, 5:19.**
- PIT – Emmanuel Sanders 1-yard pass from Ben Roethlisberger (Shaun Suisham kick), 0:01. Tied 7–7. **Drive: 7 plays, 73 yards, 4:01.**

**Second quarter**

- GB – Eddie Lacy 14-yard run (Mason Crosby kick), 1:53. Packers 14–7. **Drive: 7 plays, 71 yards, 2:49.**
- PIT – Shaun Suisham 31-yard field goal, 0:02. Packers 14–10. **Drive: 8 plays, 32 yards, 1:51.**

**Third quarter**

- PIT – Ben Roethlisberger 13-yard run (Shaun Suisham kick), 11:51. Steelers 17–14. **Drive: 6 plays, 75 yards, 3:09.**
- GB – Eddie Lacy 2-yard run (Mason Crosby kick), 5:19. Packers 21–17. **Drive: 4 plays, 3 yards, 1:07.**
- PIT – Matt Spaeth 11-yard pass from Ben Roethlisberger (Shaun Suisham kick), 1:55. Steelers 24–21. **Drive: 6 plays, 68 yards, 3:24.**
- PIT – Cortez Allen 40-yard interception return (Shaun Suisham kick), 1:37. Steelers 31–21.

**Fourth quarter**

- GB – Mason Crosby 22-yard field goal, 12:04. Steelers 31–24. **Drive: 6 plays, 19 yards, 2:56.**
- GB – John Kuhn 1-yard run (Mason Crosby kick), 7:14. Tied 31–31. **Drive: 6 plays, 58 yards, 3:13.**
- PIT – Le'Veon Bell 1-yard run (Shaun Suisham kick), 1:25. Steelers 38–31. **Drive: 5 plays, 17 yards, 0:26.**

**Top passers**

- PIT – Ben Roethlisberger – 16/28, 167 yards, 2 TD, INT
- GB – Matt Flynn – 21/39, 232 yards, TD, INT

**Top rushers**

- PIT – Le'Veon Bell – 26 rushes, 124 yards, TD
- GB – Eddie Lacy – 15 rushes, 84 yards, 2 TD

**Top receivers**

- PIT – Antonio Brown – 6 receptions, 105 yards
- GB – James Jones – 9 receptions, 84 yards

After the win at home against the Bengals, the Steelers traveled to take on the Packers in a rematch of Super Bowl XLV. Coming into this game with a record of 2–5 in road games, the Packers scored first when Matt Flynn found Jarrett Boykin on a 5-yard pass for a 7–0 lead. The Steelers managed to tie it up late in the first quarter when Ben Roethlisberger found Emmanuel Sanders on a 1-yard pass taking the game to 7–7. In the 2nd quarter, the Packers retook the lead as Eddie Lacy ran for a 14-yard touchdown making the score 14–7. This was followed up by the Steelers coming within 4 as Suisham kicked a 31-yard field goal as for a 14–10 score at halftime. After the break, the Steelers took the lead as Roethlisberger rushed for a touchdown himself from 13 yards out making the score 17–14. The Packers took the lead back as Lacy ran for a 2-yard touchdown making the score 21–17. The Steelers then moved back into the lead as Roethlisberger found Matt Spaeth on an 11-yard pass, making the score 24–21, and then Cortez Allen picked off Matt Flynn returning the ball 40 yards for a touchdown, making the score 31–21. In the 4th quarter, the Packers tried a comeback attempt as Mason Crosby nailed a 22-yard field goal to come within 7, at 31–24. Eventually, they managed to tie the game when John Kuhn ran for a 1-yard touchdown at 31–31. The Steelers moved back into the lead as Le'Veon Bell ran for a 1-yard touchdown for a 38–31 lead. Matt Flynn moved the Packers down the field but his last attempt within the final 3 seconds was incomplete, sealing the win for the Steelers as they improved to 7–8 while finishing 3–5 in road games.

==== Week 17: vs. Cleveland Browns ====
Week Seventeen: Cleveland Browns at Pittsburgh Steelers – Game summary

| Quarter | 1 | 2 | 3 | 4 | Total |
|---|---|---|---|---|---|
| Browns | 0 | 0 | 0 | 7 | **7** |
| **Steelers** | 7 | 7 | 3 | 3 | **20** |

at Heinz Field, Pittsburgh, Pennsylvania

- Date: December 29
- Game time: 1:00 pm. EST
- Game weather: 41 °F (5 °C), (Light Rain)
- Game attendance: 56,361
- Referee: Mike Carey
- TV announcers (CBS): Spero Dedes and Steve Beuerlein
- Recap, Game book

Game information

**First quarter**

- PIT – Jerricho Cotchery 9-yard pass from Ben Roethlisberger (Shaun Suisham kick), 9:53. Steelers 7–0. **Drive: 9 plays, 62 yards, 3:36.**

**Second quarter**

- PIT – Le'Veon Bell 5-yard run (Shaun Suisham kick), 4:22. Steelers 14–0. **Drive: 14 plays, 67 yards, 8:17.**

**Third quarter**

- PIT – Shaun Suisham 30-yard field goal, 3:50. Steelers 17–0. **Drive: 11 plays, 54 yards, 5:13.**

**Fourth quarter**

- PIT – Shaun Suisham 32-yard field goal, 8:26. Steelers 20–0. **Drive: 4 plays, 8 yards, 2:06.**
- CLE – Fozzy Whittaker 35-yard pass from Jason Campbell (Billy Cundiff kick), 2:46. Steelers 20–7. **Drive: 9 plays, 70 yards, 2:57.**

**Top passers**

- CLE – Jason Campbell – 23/41, 240 yards, TD, INT
- PIT – Ben Roethlisberger – 19/31, 179 yards, TD, 2 INT

**Top rushers**

- CLE – Edwin Baker – 18 rushes, 69 yards
- PIT – Le'Veon Bell – 20 rushes, 90 yards, TD

**Top receivers**

- CLE – Josh Gordon – 7 receptions, 82 yards
- PIT – Antonio Brown – 9 receptions, 87 yards

The Steelers' final game of the season would be at home against the Browns. They would draw first blood as Ben Roethlisberger found Jerricho Cotchery on a 9-yard pass for a 7–0 lead. Le'Veon Bell ran for a touchdown from 5 yards out making the score 14–0 at halftime. Shaun Suisham would go on to kick 2 field goals in the 3rd and 4th quarters from 30 and 32 yards out making the score 17–0, and 20–0. Later on in the quarter, the Browns managed to score their only 7 points of the whole game as Jason Campbell found Fozzy Whittaker on a 35-yard pass for a final score of 20–7.

The team finished the season with another 8–8 record and despite losses by the Ravens and Dolphins, the Steelers were eliminated from playoff contention for the second consecutive season after the Chargers defeated the Chiefs. This would be the first time since 1999 and 2000 that the Steelers would fail to make the playoffs in consecutive seasons.

Antonio Brown became the first player in NFL History to record at least five catches and 50 yards in every game.

== Standings ==
=== Division ===
AFC North
| | W | L | T | PCT | DIV | CONF | PF | PA | STK |
|---|---|---|---|---|---|---|---|---|---|
| ^{(3)} Cincinnati Bengals | 11 | 5 | 0 | .688 | 3–3 | 8–4 | 430 | 305 | W2 |
| Pittsburgh Steelers | 8 | 8 | 0 | .500 | 4–2 | 6–6 | 379 | 370 | W3 |
| Baltimore Ravens | 8 | 8 | 0 | .500 | 3–3 | 6–6 | 320 | 352 | L2 |
| Cleveland Browns | 4 | 12 | 0 | .250 | 2–4 | 3–9 | 308 | 406 | L7 |

=== Conference ===
AFC
| # | Team | Division | W | L | T | PCT | DIV | CONF | SOS | SOV | STK |
|---|---|---|---|---|---|---|---|---|---|---|---|
Division winners
| 1 | Denver Broncos | West | 13 | 3 | 0 | .813 | 5–1 | 9–3 | .469 | .423 | W2 |
| 2 | New England Patriots | East | 12 | 4 | 0 | .750 | 4–2 | 9–3 | .473 | .427 | W2 |
| 3 (Note: Cincinnati defeated Indianapolis head-to-head (Week 14, 42–28).) | Cincinnati Bengals | North | 11 | 5 | 0 | .688 | 3–3 | 8–4 | .480 | .494 | W2 |
| 4 | Indianapolis Colts | South | 11 | 5 | 0 | .688 | 6–0 | 9–3 | .484 | .449 | W3 |
Wild cards
| 5 | Kansas City Chiefs | West | 11 | 5 | 0 | .688 | 2–4 | 7–5 | .445 | .335 | L2 |
| 6 | San Diego Chargers | West | 9 | 7 | 0 | .563 | 4–2 | 6–6 | .496 | .549 | W4 |
Did not qualify for the postseason
| 7 (Note: Pittsburgh finished with a better division record than Baltimore.) (Note: Pittsburgh defeated the New York Jets head-to-head (Week 6, 19–6).) | Pittsburgh Steelers | North | 8 | 8 | 0 | .500 | 4–2 | 6–6 | .469 | .441 | W3 |
| 8 (Note: Baltimore defeated the New York Jets head-to-head (Week 12, 19–3).) | Baltimore Ravens | North | 8 | 8 | 0 | .500 | 3–3 | 6–6 | .484 | .418 | L2 |
| 9 (Note: The New York Jets finished with a better division record than Miami.) | New York Jets | East | 8 | 8 | 0 | .500 | 3–3 | 5–7 | .488 | .414 | W2 |
| 10 | Miami Dolphins | East | 8 | 8 | 0 | .500 | 2–4 | 7–5 | .523 | .523 | L2 |
| 11 | Tennessee Titans | South | 7 | 9 | 0 | .438 | 2–4 | 6–6 | .504 | .375 | W2 |
| 12 | Buffalo Bills | East | 6 | 10 | 0 | .375 | 3–3 | 5–7 | .520 | .500 | L1 |
| 13 (Note: Oakland and Jacksonville finished with a better conference record than Cleveland.) (Note: Oakland defeated Jacksonville head-to-head (Week 2, 19–9).) | Oakland Raiders | West | 4 | 12 | 0 | .250 | 1–5 | 4–8 | .523 | .359 | L6 |
| 14 (Note: Jacksonville defeated Cleveland head-to-head (Week 13, 32–28).) | Jacksonville Jaguars | South | 4 | 12 | 0 | .250 | 3–3 | 4–8 | .504 | .234 | L3 |
| 15 | Cleveland Browns | North | 4 | 12 | 0 | .250 | 2–4 | 3–9 | .516 | .477 | L7 |
| 16 | Houston Texans | South | 2 | 14 | 0 | .125 | 1–5 | 2–10 | .559 | .500 | L14 |
Tiebreakers (Note: When breaking ties for three or more teams under the NFL's rules, they are first broken within divisions, then comparing only the highest ranked remaining team from each division.)

== Statistics ==
Updated December 30, 2013

=== Team ===
| | Pittsburgh | Opponent |
|---|---|---|
| Total first downs | 312 | 303 |
| Rushing first downs | 81 | 106 |
| Passing first downs | 207 | 174 |
| By penalty first downs | 24 | 23 |
| Third down Conversions | 82/216 | 91/230 |
| Fourth down Conversions | 9/15 | 9/20 |
| Total Offensive Yards | 5,400 | 5,395 |
| Offensive plays | 1,023 | 1,036 |
| Average yards per play | 5.3 | 5.2 |
| Total rushing yards | 1,383 | 1,849 |
| Rushing plays | 394 | 433 |
| Rushing yards per play | 3.5 | 4.3 |
| Total passing yards | 4,017 | 3,546 |
| Passing completions/attempts | 377/586 | 329/569 |
| Interceptions | 14 | 10 |
| Passing yards per play | 7.3 | 6.6 |
| Sacks | 34.0 | 43.0 |
| Field goals | 30/32 | 28/31 |
| Touchdowns | 41 | 41 |
| Rushing touchdowns | 9 | 18 |
| Passing touchdowns | 28 | 21 |
| Return touchdowns | 1 | 0 |
| Defensive touchdowns | 3 | 2 |
| Time of possession | 30:53 | 29:06 |
| Turnover ratio | −4 | |

=== Passing ===
Regular season
| Player | ATT | COMP | YDS | COMP % | YDS/ATT | TD | TD % | INT | INT % | LONG | SCK | LOST | RATING |
|---|---|---|---|---|---|---|---|---|---|---|---|---|---|
| Ben Roethlisberger | 584 | 375 | 4,261 | 64.2 | 7.3 | 28 | 4.8 | 14 | 2.4 | 67 | 42 | 282 | 92.0 |
| Mat McBriar | 1 | 1 | 30 | 100.0 | 30.0 | 0 | 0.0 | 0 | 0.0 | 30 | 0 | 0 | 118.8 |
| Antonio Brown | 1 | 1 | 15 | 100.0 | 15.0 | 0 | 0.0 | 0 | 0.0 | 15 | 1 | 7 | 118.8 |

=== Rushing ===
Regular season
| Player | ATT | YDS | YDS/ATT | LONG | TD |
|---|---|---|---|---|---|
| Le'Veon Bell | 244 | 860 | 3.5 | 43 | 8 |
| Jonathan Dwyer | 49 | 197 | 4.0 | 30 | 0 |
| Felix Jones | 48 | 184 | 3.8 | 14 | 0 |
| Ben Roethlisberger | 27 | 99 | 3.7 | 19 | 1 |
| Isaac Redman | 10 | 12 | 1.2 | 8 | 0 |
| Antonio Brown | 7 | 4 | 0.6 | 10 | 0 |
| LaRod Stephens-Howling | 6 | 19 | 3.2 | 5 | 0 |
| Jerricho Cotchery | 1 | −5 | −5.0 | −5 | 0 |
| Emmanuel Sanders | 1 | 25 | 25.0 | 25 | 0 |
| Shaun Suisham | 1 | −12 | −12.0 | −12 | 0 |
| Total | 394 | 1383 | 3.5 | – | 9 |

=== Receiving ===
Regular season
| Player | ATT | YDS | YDS/REC | LONG | TD |
|---|---|---|---|---|---|
| Antonio Brown | 110 | 1499 | 13.6 | 56 | 8 |
| Emmanuel Sanders | 67 | 740 | 11.0 | 55 | 6 |
| Heath Miller | 58 | 593 | 10.2 | 31 | 1 |
| Jerricho Cotchery | 46 | 602 | 13.1 | 36 | 10 |
| Le'Veon Bell | 45 | 399 | 8.9 | 43 | 0 |
| Felix Jones | 9 | 63 | 7.0 | 15 | 0 |
| Jonathan Dwyer | 8 | 64 | 8.0 | 23 | 0 |
| Will Johnson | 8 | 41 | 5.1 | 9 | 1 |
| David Paulson | 6 | 102 | 17.0 | 34 | 0 |
| Markus Wheaton | 6 | 64 | 10.7 | 21 | 0 |
| David Johnson | 4 | 70 | 17.5 | 32 | 0 |
| Isaac Redman | 4 | 14 | 3.5 | 7 | 0 |
| Derek Moye | 2 | 20 | 10.0 | 19 | 1 |
| LaRod Stephens-Howling | 2 | 11 | 5.5 | 7 | 0 |
| Michael Palmer | 1 | 8 | 8.0 | 8 | 0 |
| Matt Spaeth | 1 | 11 | 11.0 | 11 | 1 |
| Total | 377 | 4,301 | 11.4 | – | 28 |

=== Field goals ===
Regular season
| Player | 1–19 | 20–29 | 30–39 | 40–49 | 50+ |
|---|---|---|---|---|---|
| Shaun Suisham | 0/0 | 9/9 | 15/13 | 8/8 | 0/0 |
| Total | 0/0 | 9/9 | 15/13 | 8/8 | 0/0 |
| Opponent total | 1/1 | 8/8 | 10/10 | 10/8 | 2/1 |

=== Punting ===
Regular season
| Player | Punts | AVG | TB | In 20 | LONG | BLK |
|---|---|---|---|---|---|---|
| Mat McBriar | 40 | 41.3 | 3 | 13 | 70 | 1 |
| Zoltan Mesko | 34 | 42.5 | 2 | 3 | 65 | 0 |
| Ben Roethlisberger | 1 | 28.0 | 0 | 1 | 28 | 0 |
| Total | 75 | 41.1 | 5 | 17 | 70 | 1 |
| Opponent total | 79 | 43.0 | 8 | 22 | 61 | 0 |

=== Punt returns ===
Regular season
| Player | RT | FC | YDS/RET | LONG | TD |
|---|---|---|---|---|---|
| Antonio Brown | 32 | 23 | 12.8 | 67 | 1 |
| Total | 32 | 23 | 12.8 | 67 | 1 |
| Opponent total | 35 | 16 | 8.9 | 43 | 0 |

=== Kick returns ===
Regular season
| Player | RT | YDS | YDS/RET | LONG | TD |
|---|---|---|---|---|---|
| Felix Jones | 23 | 510 | 22.2 | 42 | 0 |
| Emmanuel Sanders | 10 | 268 | 26.8 | 46 | 0 |
| Jonathan Dwyer | 4 | 90 | 22.5 | 27 | 0 |
| Markus Wheaton | 2 | 37 | 18.5 | 25 | 0 |
| Antonio Brown | 1 | 16 | 16 | 16 | 0 |
| Cameron Heyward | 1 | 11 | 11 | 11 | 0 |
| Michael Palmer | 1 | 5 | 5 | 5 | 0 |
| LaRod Stephens-Howling | 1 | 25 | 25 | 25 | 0 |
| Total | 43 | 962 | 22.4 | 46 | 0 |
| Opponent total | 55 | 1,233 | 22.4 | 73 | 0 |

=== Defense ===
Regular season
| Player | T | S | A | SCK | F |
|---|---|---|---|---|---|
| Lawrence Timmons | 126 | 86 | 40 | 3 | 1 |
| Ryan Clark | 104 | 61 | 43 | 0 | 0 |
| William Gay | 63 | 55 | 8 | 1 | 2 |
| Ike Taylor | 63 | 52 | 11 | 0 | 0 |
| Troy Polamalu | 69 | 50 | 19 | 2 | 5 |
| Cortez Allen | 51 | 44 | 7 | 0 | 0 |
| Jason Worilds | 63 | 43 | 20 | 8 | 2 |
| Vince Williams | 53 | 40 | 13 | 0 | 0 |
| Cameron Heyward | 59 | 35 | 24 | 5 | 0 |
| Jarvis Jones | 40 | 30 | 10 | 1 | 0 |
| Ziggy Hood | 39 | 26 | 13 | 3 | 0 |
| Will Allen | 34 | 25 | 9 | 0 | 1 |
| Shamarko Thomas | 29 | 22 | 7 | 0 | 0 |
| Brett Keisel | 29 | 20 | 9 | 4 | 1 |
| Steve McLendon | 33 | 20 | 13 | 0 | 1 |
| LaMarr Woodley | 36 | 20 | 16 | 5 | 1 |
| Terence Garvin | 11 | 11 | 0 | 0 | 0 |
| Robert Golden | 14 | 10 | 4 | 0 | 1 |
| Antwon Blake | 11 | 8 | 3 | 0 | 0 |
| Kion Wilson | 12 | 8 | 4 | 0 | 0 |
| Al Woods | 16 | 8 | 8 | 2 | 0 |
| Stevenson Sylvester | 12 | 7 | 5 | 0 | 0 |
| Markus Wheaton | 7 | 7 | 0 | 0 | 0 |
| Curtis Brown | 7 | 6 | 1 | 0 | 0 |
| Will Johnson | 7 | 6 | 1 | 0 | 0 |
| Shaun Suisham | 7 | 6 | 1 | 0 | 1 |
| Chris Carter | 5 | 4 | 1 | 0 | 0 |
| Larry Foote | 8 | 3 | 5 | 0 | 0 |
| Emmanuel Sanders | 3 | 3 | 0 | 0 | 0 |
| Antonio Brown | 2 | 2 | 0 | 0 | 0 |
| Jerricho Cotchery | 2 | 2 | 0 | 0 | 0 |
| Michael Palmer | 2 | 2 | 0 | 0 | 0 |
| Fernando Velasco | 2 | 2 | 0 | 0 | 0 |
| Cody Wallace | 2 | 2 | 0 | 0 | 0 |
| Mike Adams | 1 | 1 | 0 | 0 | 0 |
| Kelvin Beachum | 1 | 1 | 0 | 0 | 0 |
| Da'Mon Cromartie-Smith | 1 | 1 | 0 | 0 | 0 |
| David DeCastro | 1 | 1 | 0 | 0 | 0 |
| Ramon Foster | 1 | 1 | 0 | 0 | 0 |
| Derek Moye | 1 | 1 | 0 | 0 | 0 |
| Matt Spaeth | 1 | 1 | 0 | 0 | 0 |
| DeMarcus Van Dyke | 1 | 1 | 0 | 0 | 0 |
| Guy Whimper | 1 | 1 | 0 | 0 | 0 |
| Total | 1,071 | 774 | 297 | 34 | 16 |
| Opponent total | 1,072 | 745 | 327 | 43 | 12 |

=== Interceptions ===
Regular season
| Player | INT | YDS | YDS/INT | LONG | TD |
|---|---|---|---|---|---|
| Cortez Allen | 2 | 43 | 21.5 | 40 | 1 |
| Ryan Clark | 2 | 50 | 25.0 | 37 | 0 |
| Troy Polamalu | 2 | 36 | 18.0 | 19 | 1 |
| Lawrence Timmons | 2 | 26 | 13.0 | 23 | 0 |
| Will Allen | 1 | 27 | 27.0 | 27 | 0 |
| William Gay | 1 | 21 | 21.0 | 21 | 1 |
| Total | 10 | 203 | 20.3 | 40 | 3 |
| Opponent total | 14 | 170 | 12.1 | 57 | 1 |

== Transactions ==
The Steelers were involved in the following transactions during the 2013 season:

=== Trades ===
| April 27, 2013 | To Cleveland Browns 2013 fourth-round pick (#111–Shamarko Thomas) | To Pittsburgh Steelers 2014 third-round pick |
| August 23, 2013 | To Philadelphia Eagles Adrian Robinson | To Pittsburgh Steelers Felix Jones |
| October 2, 2013 | To Arizona Cardinals Conditional Draft Pick | To Pittsburgh Steelers Levi Brown |

=== Free agents acquired ===
| Player | Former team | Contract terms |
|---|---|---|
| Bruce Gradkowski | Cincinnati Bengals | 3-year/$4.95 million |
| LaRod Stephens-Howling | Arizona Cardinals | 1 year/$780,000 |
| Brian Moorman | Dallas Cowboys | 1 year/$940,000 |

=== Free agents lost ===
| Player | New team | Contract terms |
|---|---|---|
| Mike Wallace | Miami Dolphins | 5-year/$60 million |
| Rashard Mendenhall | Arizona Cardinals | 1 year/$2.5 million |
| Keenan Lewis | New Orleans Saints | 5-year/$25.5 million |
| Ryan Mundy | New York Giants | 1 year/$780,000 |
| Will Allen | Dallas Cowboys | 1 year/$905,000 |
| Max Starks | San Diego Chargers | 1 year/$840,000 |
| Doug Legursky | Buffalo Bills | Undisclosed |

=== Claimed via waivers ===
| Player | Previous team | Date |
|---|---|---|
| John Parker Wilson | Jacksonville Jaguars | February 28, 2013 |

=== Player signings ===
| Player | Date | Contract terms |
|---|---|---|
| William Gay | March 4, 2013 | 3-year/$4.5 million |
| Jonathan Dwyer | March 11, 2013 | 1 year/$1.323 million |
| Ramon Foster | March 11, 2013 | 3-year/$5.8 million |
| David Johnson | March 12, 2013 | 1 year/unknown |
| Larry Foote | March 12, 2013 | 3-year/$5.5 million |
| Plaxico Burress | March 12, 2013 | 1 year/$940,000 |
| Greg Warren | March 13, 2013 | 1 year/unknown |
| Matt Spaeth | March 18, 2013 | 2-year/$2 million |
| Stevenson Sylvester | April 3, 2013 | 1 year/unknown |
| Emmanuel Sanders | April 14, 2013 | 1 year/$2.5 million |
| Isaac Redman | April 18, 2013 | 1 year/$1.323 million |
| Steve McLendon | April 18, 2013 | 3-year/$7.25 million |
| Brian Arnfelt | April 28, 2013 | Unknown |
| Alan Baxter | April 28, 2013 | Unknown |
| Nik Embernate | April 28, 2013 | Unknown |
| Reggie Dunn | April 28, 2013 | Unknown |
| Mike Farrell | April 28, 2013 | Unknown |
| Mike Golic Jr | April 28, 2013 | Unknown |
| Cordian Hagans | April 28, 2013 | Unknown |
| Chris Hubbard | April 28, 2013 | Unknown |
| Omar Hunter | April 28, 2013 | Unknown |
| Luke Ingram | April 28, 2013 | Unknown |
| Joe Madsen | April 28, 2013 | Unknown |
| Curtis McNeal | April 28, 2013 | Unknown |
| Ivory Wade | April 28, 2013 | Unknown |
| Anthony Rashad White | April 28, 2013 | Unknown |
| J.D. Woods | April 28, 2013 | Unknown |
| Terence Garvin | May 6, 2013 | Unknown |
| Guy Whimper | May 6, 2013 | Unknown |
| Shamarko Thomas | May 16, 2013 | 4-year/$2,613,152 |
| Vince Williams | May 20, 2013 | 4-year/$2,238,680 |
| Justin Brown | May 23, 2013 | 4-year/$2,264,072 |
| Markus Wheaton | May 23, 2013 | 4-year/$2,811,376 |
| Terry Hawthorne | May 23, 2013 | 4-year/$2,350,052 |
| Jarvis Jones | June 3, 2013 | 4-year/$8,705,502 |
| Le'Veon Bell | June 3, 2013 | 4-year/$2.146 million |
| Nicholas Williams | June 3, 2013 | 4-year/$2,217,848 |
| Peter Tuitupou | June 3, 2013 | |
| Nigel Malone | June 6, 2013 | |
| Landry Jones | June 13, 2013 | 4-year/$2,599,220 |
| Cody Wallace | September 1, 2013 | |
| Zoltan Mesko | September 2, 2013 | |
| Jonathan Dwyer | September 9, 2013 | |
| Shayne Graham | September 9, 2013 | |
| Fernando Velasco | September 9, 2013 | |
| Stevenson Sylvester | October 9, 2013 | |
| Will Allen | October 10, 2013 | |
| Richard Gordon | October 15, 2013 | |
| Mat McBriar | October 29, 2013 | |
| Eric Olsen | November 30, 2013 | |
| Rashad Butler | November 30, 2013 | |
| David Snow | December 3, 2013 | |
| Jamaal Westerman | December 17, 2013 | |

=== Other ===
| Player | Date | Details |
|---|---|---|
| Chris Rainey | January 10, 2013 | Waived |
| James Harrison | March 9, 2013 | Released |
| Willie Colon | March 13, 2013 | Released |
| Ivory Wade | May 6, 2013 | Waived |
| Anthony Rashad White | May 6, 2013 | Waived |
| Joe Greene | May 6, 2013 | Retired as special assistant |
| Zack Pianalto | June 3, 2013 | Waived (injured) |
| John Malecki | September 1, 2013 | Waived |
| Drew Butler | September 2, 2013 | Released |
| Shayne Graham | September 17, 2013 | Released |
| Isaac Redman | October 21, 2013 | Waived |
| Zoltan Mesko | October 29, 2013 | Waived |
| Rashad Butler | December 2, 2013 | Left team (personal reasons) |
| Richard Gordon | December 7, 2013 | Released |
| Kion Wilson | December 14, 2013 | Released |
