= Blake Lynch =

American football player (born 1997)

Profile
- Position: Linebacker

Personal information
- Born: February 14, 1997 (age 29); Troup, Texas, U.S.
- Listed height: 6 ft 3 in (1.91 m)
- Listed weight: 225 lb (102 kg)

Career information
- High school: Gilmer (TX)
- College: Baylor (2015–2019)
- NFL draft: 2020: undrafted

Career history
- Minnesota Vikings (2020–2021); Arizona Cardinals (2022–2023)*; Los Angeles Chargers (2023); Seattle Seahawks (2024)*; Los Angeles Chargers (2024)*; Las Vegas Raiders (2024)*; Kansas City Chiefs (2024); Tennessee Titans (2025)*
- * Offseason or practice squad member only

Career NFL statistics as of 2024
- Total tackles: 57
- Sacks: 2
- Forced fumbles: 1
- Fumble recoveries: 1
- Pass deflections: 3
- Interceptions: 1
- Stats at Pro Football Reference

Blake Lynch (born February 14, 1997) is an American professional football linebacker. He played college football for the Baylor Bears, and has previously played in the National Football League (NFL) for the Minnesota Vikings and Los Angeles Chargers.

== College career ==
Born in Gilmer, Texas, Lynch attended Gilmer High School, where he played alongside future Vikings teammate Kris Boyd. After redshirting in his freshman year, he played college football for Baylor, where he made 32 career starts at five different positions (cornerback, linebacker, safety, wide receiver and running back). In a four-year college career, he accrued 673 receiving yards, four receiving touchdowns and 79 rushing yards.

== Professional career ==
Pre-draft measurables
| Height | Weight |
|---|---|
| 6 ft 2 1/8 in (1.88 m) | 225 lb (102 kg) |
Values from Pro Day

=== Minnesota Vikings ===
Lynch was signed by the Minnesota Vikings as an undrafted free agent following the 2020 NFL draft on April 28, 2020. He was waived during final roster cuts on September 5, and signed to the team's practice squad the following day. He was elevated to the active roster on December 12 for the team's week 14 game against the Tampa Bay Buccaneers, and reverted to the practice squad after the game. He played 13 snaps on special teams, and his only statistical contribution was a downed punt at the end of the Vikings' first drive of the game. He was promoted to the active roster on December 16, and played in the game against the Chicago Bears. He played one defensive snap, contributing one tackle assist, and 16 special teams snaps, making one tackle on kick coverage in the game.

On August 30, 2022, Lynch was waived by the Vikings.

=== Arizona Cardinals ===
On October 18, 2022, Lynch was signed to the Arizona Cardinals practice squad. He signed a reserve/future contract on January 11, 2023. Lynch was released by the Cardinals on May 15.

=== Los Angeles Chargers (first stint) ===
On July 28, 2023, Lynch signed with the Los Angeles Chargers. He was waived on August 29, and re-signed to the practice squad on October 24. Lynch was signed to the active roster on November 21.

=== Seattle Seahawks ===
On August 5, 2024, Lynch signed with the Seattle Seahawks. He was released on August 27.

=== Los Angeles Chargers (second stint) ===
On September 24, 2024, Lynch signed with the Los Angeles Chargers practice squad. He was released on October 15.

=== Las Vegas Raiders ===
On October 16, 2024, Lynch signed with the Las Vegas Raiders practice squad. He was released on November 19.

=== Kansas City Chiefs ===
On December 30, 2024, Lynch was signed to the Kansas City Chiefs practice squad. He was released on January 7, 2025. On March 3, Lynch re-signed with the Chiefs. On May 3, Lynch was waived by the Chiefs.

=== Tennessee Titans ===
On August 12, 2025, Lynch signed with the Tennessee Titans. He was released on August 26 as part of final roster cuts.
