= Kris Boyd (American football) =

American football player (born 1996)

Profile
- Position: Cornerback

Personal information
- Born: September 12, 1996 (age 30); Gilmer, Texas, U.S.
- Listed height: 5 ft 11 in (1.80 m)
- Listed weight: 201 lb (91 kg)

Career information
- High school: Gilmer
- College: Texas (2015–2018)
- NFL draft: 2019: 7th round, 217th overall pick

Career history
- Minnesota Vikings (2019–2022); Arizona Cardinals (2023); Houston Texans (2023–2024); New York Jets (2025)

Awards and highlights
- First-team All-Big 12 (2018); Second-team All-Big 12 (2017)

Career NFL statistics as of 2025
- Total tackles: 105
- Forced fumbles: 2
- Fumble recoveries: 5
- Pass deflections: 3
- Stats at Pro Football Reference

Kris Boyd (born September 12, 1996) is an American professional football cornerback. He played college football for the Texas Longhorns and was selected by the Minnesota Vikings in the seventh round of the 2019 NFL draft.

== Early life ==
Boyd attended Gilmer High School in Gilmer, Texas, where he played both running back and defensive back under current UTSA Roadrunners head coach Jeff Traylor. As a sophomore in 2012, he was chosen "Offensive Newcomer of the Year" in District 16-3A after rushing for 1,276 yards and 19 touchdowns and recording 18 tackles and one forced fumble on defense, helping lead Gilmer to a 14–2 record. In his junior season, he was tabbed first-team All-District 16-3A as Gilmer had an 11–2 record, including a 5–1 district mark, and an appearance in the 3A Division 2 regional playoffs in 2013. Boyd totaled 1,052 rushing yards and 808 receiving yards (31 total touchdowns) on offense as a senior. He also recorded 43 tackles, two interceptions, four pass breakups and one fumble recovery on defense, leading Gilmer to a 16–0 record and the 4A Division 2 state championship. Following his senior season, he was selected to participate in the 2015 U.S. Army All-America Bowl.

Boyd was also a standout track and field performer at Gilmer. As a senior, he was a member of the 4 × 200-meter relay unit that set a record at the 2015 UIL 4A state meet (1:25.49). He was also the runner-up in the 100 meters at that meet with a time of 10.58 seconds.

== College career ==
Boyd played four seasons as a defensive back for the Texas Longhorns. He appeared in 51 games and made 33 starts. Boyd became a starter at cornerback for the Longhorns during his sophomore season, when he started the final eight games of the season and finished sixth on the team with 51 tackles along with an interception, five pass breakups, two forced fumbles, and two fumble recoveries. He collected 191 tackles (141 solo) with four interceptions, 40 passes defended, four forced fumbles and three fumble recoveries. He was named second-team All-Big 12 Conference by the Associated Press after his junior season, when he made 57 tackles with two interceptions and 15 pass breakups. As a senior in 2018, Boyd made 54 tackles, including 4.5 for loss, with one sack first and 15 passes defensed and was named first-team All-Big 12. He was invited to play in the Senior Bowl following his senior season.

== Professional career ==
Pre-draft measurables
Height	Weight	Arm length	Hand span	40-yard dash	10-yard split	20-yard split	20-yard shuttle	Three-cone drill	Vertical jump	Broad jump	Bench press
5 ft 11 1/2 in (1.82 m)	201 lb (91 kg)	30 3/4 in (0.78 m)	9 in (0.23 m)	4.45 s	1.52 s	2.63 s	4.08 s	6.94 s	36.5 in (0.93 m)	10 ft 7 in (3.23 m)	19 reps
All values from NFL Combine

=== Minnesota Vikings ===
Originally projected as a mid-round pick, Boyd slid before being selected in the seventh round (217th overall) of the 2019 NFL draft by the Minnesota Vikings, joining ex-teammate at Texas and close friend Holton Hill. Boyd signed a four-year, $2.6 million contract with the Vikings on May 5, 2019.

Boyd made his NFL debut against the Atlanta Falcons on September 8, 2019, making two tackles while also drawing two penalties. Boyd finished his rookie season with 22 tackles, one forced fumble and one pass defended.

On December 15, 2020, Boyd was placed on injured reserve with a shoulder injury.

=== Arizona Cardinals ===
On April 10, 2023, Boyd signed with the Arizona Cardinals. He was released on October 2.

=== Houston Texans ===
On October 27, 2023, Boyd was signed to the practice squad of the Houston Texans. He was promoted to the active roster on December 6. He re-signed with the Texans on March 19, 2024.

In the divisional round of the 2024 playoffs versus the Kansas City Chiefs, Boyd forced a fumble on the opening kickoff, although the ball was recovered by the Chiefs. Coming off the field after the play, Boyd threw his helmet to the ground and then shoved his special teams coach, Frank Ross. Boyd remained in the game. In the postgame media availability Boyd said his actions were in celebration as he was hyped up.

=== New York Jets ===
On March 15, 2025, Boyd signed a one-year contract with the New York Jets. He was placed on injured reserve on August 18. He became a free agent on March 7, 2026.

== Personal life ==
Boyd's brother, DeMarco, is a former linebacker for the Texas Longhorns. Two of Boyd's cousins, Bobby Taylor and Curtis Brown, also played in the NFL.

=== 2025 shooting ===
On November 16, 2025, around 2 a.m., Boyd was shot in the abdomen after a dispute turned violent outside a restaurant in Midtown Manhattan. He was transported to Bellevue Hospital in critical but stable condition.
