= Gilmer Independent School District =

School district in Texas

Location
- Gilmer, Texas United States of America

District information
- Type: Public School
- Grades: PK-12
- Superintendent: Rick Albritton

Students and staff
- Students: 2401
- Teachers: 220
- Staff: 70
- Athletic conference: UIL Class 4A
- District mascot: Buckeyes
- Colors: Orange & Black

Other information
- Website: www.gilmerisd.org

Gilmer Independent School District is a 4A public school district based in Gilmer, in the U.S. state of Texas.

The district is located in central Upshur County and extends into a small portion of southern Camp County.

For 2021-22, the district was given an overall rating of 'A', with a scaled score of 90, and distinction in Postsecondary Readiness.

== Schools ==
Gilmer ISD operates five schools:

- Gilmer High School (Grades 9-12)
- Gilmer-Bruce Junior High School (Grades 7-8)
- Gilmer Intermediate School (Grades 5-6)
- Gilmer Elementary School (Grades K-4)
- Gilmer Early Childhood Center (Grade PK)

== History ==
Like other Texas school districts, Gilmer ISD formerly separated children into different schools on the basis of race. In 1965 the district established a plan to racially integrate their school system.

== Notable alumni ==
- Kris Boyd, NFL player
- Curtis Brown, former NFL player
- Manuel Johnson, former NFL player
- Blake Lynch, NFL player
- Kenneth Pettway, former NFL player
- David Snow, former NFL player

== Notable faculty ==
- Jeff Traylor, head football coach from 2000-2014

== Athletics ==
The Gilmer Buckeyes compete in the following sports: Baseball, Basketball, Cross Country, Football, Golf, Powerlifting, Softball, Swimming, Track & Field, Tennis and Volleyball

=== State Titles ===
- Football
  - 2004(3A/D2), 2009(3A/D1), 2014(4A/D2), 2023(4A/D2)
- Boys Track & Field
  - 2015(4A), 2023(4A)
- Military Marching Band
  - 2025(4A)

==== State Finalists ====
- Football
  - 1981(3A), 2007(3A/D1), 2012(3A/D2), 2020(4A/D2), 2021(4A/D2)

Football Season Record Table
Season	Conf	Dist	Overall Record	District Record	Playoff Record	Coach	Notes
1914			2-4			Jerome R. Reid	
1915			2-5			J.W. (Tubby) David	
1916			2-3			Jerome R. Reid (11-10)	
1917			7-3			Jerome R. Reid (11-10)	Coach Keahey?
1918			2-1				
1919			3-5-2			J.B. Gay	
1920			6-3				
1921			10-2			J. Dudley Warren	
1922			1-5-2			W.B. Preston	
1923			4-2				
1924			7-0-2			Henry McClelland (81-25-7)	
1925			4-3-1			Henry McClelland (81-25-7)	
1926	B		7-2-1		1-0	Henry McClelland (81-25-7)	Regional Champion *
1927	B		5-3			Henry McClelland (81-25-7)	
1928	B		9-3		1-1	Henry McClelland (81-25-7)	
1929	B		11-1		2-0	Henry McClelland (81-25-7)	Regional Champion *
1930	B		11-2		2-0	Henry McClelland (81-25-7)	Regional Champion *
1931	B		5-2-2			Henry McClelland (81-25-7)	
1932	B		9-2-1		1-1	Henry McClelland (81-25-7)	
1933	B		9-2		2-0	Henry McClelland (81-25-7)	Regional Champion *
1934	B	11	4-5			Henry McClelland (81-25-7)	
1935	B	11	4-3-2			R.D. Hitt	
1936	B	18	3-7			Charlie Bickley	
1937	B	18	5-5			Thomas Wilson	
1938	B	19	3-6-1			Leonard Pickett (22-14-4)	
1939	B	19	3-5-1			Leonard Pickett (22-14-4)	
1940	1A	19	4-3-2			Leonard Pickett (22-14-4)	
1941	1A	19	12-0		2-0	Leonard Pickett (22-14-4)	Regional Champion *
1942	1A	19	6-0			John Avery	
1943	1A	19	9-2		1-1	Ross Baldwin (24-3-3)	
1944	1A	19	7-1-1			Ross Baldwin (24-3-3)	
1945	1A	19	8-0-2			Ross Baldwin (24-3-3)	
1946	1A	19	5-3-1			Leonard Pickett (35-40-3)	
1947	1A	19	3-7			Leonard Pickett (35-40-3)	
1948	1A	15	5-5			Leonard Pickett (35-40-3)	
1949	1A	15	1-9			Leonard Pickett (35-40-3)	
1950	1A	15	3-7			Leonard Pickett (35-40-3)	
1951	1A	15	7-3			Leonard Pickett (35-40-3)	
1952	1A	16	5-4-1			Leonard Pickett (35-40-3)	
1953	1A	16	6-2-1			Leonard Pickett (35-40-3)	
1954	2A	14	5-5			Truett Rattan (84-50-6)	
1955	2A	14	4-5-1			Truett Rattan (84-50-6)	
1956	2A	15	10-1-1		2-1	Truett Rattan (84-50-6)	State Quarterfinalist
1957	2A	15	9-1			Truett Rattan (84-50-6)	
1958	2A	14	9-2-1		1-1	Truett Rattan (84-50-6)	
1959	2A	14	5-5			Truett Rattan (84-50-6)	
1960	2A	16	10-3		2-1	Truett Rattan (84-50-6)	State Quarterfinalist
1961	2A	16	8-3-1		1-1	Truett Rattan (84-50-6)	
1962	2A	16	3-6-1			Truett Rattan (84-50-6)	
1963	2A	16	7-3			Truett Rattan (84-50-6)	
1964	2A	14	5-5			Truett Rattan (84-50-6)	
1965	2A	14	7-3-1		0-1	Truett Rattan (84-50-6)	
1966	2A	14	2-8			Truett Rattan (84-50-6)	
1967	2A	14	3-7			Marvin Crawford (5-14-0)	
1968	3A	7	2-7			Marvin Crawford (5-14-0)	
1969	3A	7	4-6			Lum Wright (11-9-0)	
1970	3A	7	7-3			Lum Wright (11-9-0)	
1971	3A	7	3-6-1			Calvin Brewer (14-15-1)	
1972	3A	7	5-5			Calvin Brewer (14-15-1)	
1973	3A	7	6-4			Calvin Brewer (14-15-1)	
1974	3A	7	1-9			Russell Green (7-32-1)	
1975	3A	7	4-6			Russell Green (7-32-1)	
1976	3A	7	1-9			Russell Green (7-32-1)	
1977	3A	7	1-8-1			Russell Green (7-32-1)	
1978	3A	7	3-6-1			Tommy Waggoner (23-18-5)	
1979	3A	7	1-9			Tommy Waggoner (23-18-5)	
1980	3A	16	7-2-2		0-1	Tommy Waggoner (23-18-5)	
1981	3A	16	12-1-2		4-1	Tommy Waggoner (23-18-5)	State Runner Up
1982	3A	15	4-5-1			Terry Davis (18-12-1)	
1983	3A	15	6-4			Terry Davis (18-12-1)	
1984	3A	14	8-3		0-1	Terry Davis (18-12-1)	
1985	3A	14	10-3		2-1	Ron Dupree (12-11)	
1986	3A	16	2-8			Ron Dupree (12-11)	
1987	3A	16	6-4			Doug Busch (57-46-3)	
1988	3A	15	6-4			Doug Busch (57-46-3)	
1989	3A	15	3-6-1			Doug Busch (57-46-3)	
1990	3A	16	8-5		2-1	Doug Busch (57-46-3)	
1991	3A	16	11-2		2-1	Doug Busch (57-46-3)	
1992	3A	14	2-8			Doug Busch (57-46-3)	
1993	3A	14	6-4			Doug Busch (57-46-3)	
1994	3A	14	6-3-1			Doug Busch (57-46-3)	
1995	3A	14	4-5-1			Doug Busch (57-46-3)	
1996	3A	16	5-5			Doug Busch (57-46-3)	
1997	3A	16	7-3			Mike Mullins (17-13)	
1998	3A D1	16	5-5			Mike Mullins (17-13)	
1999	3A D1	16	5-5			Mike Mullins (17-13)	
2000	3A D1	16	6-4			Jeff Traylor (175-26)	
2001	3A D1	16	8-3		0-1	Jeff Traylor (175-26)	
2002	3A D2	11	8-3		0-1	Jeff Traylor (175-26)	
2003	3A D2	11	13-1		3-1	Jeff Traylor (175-26)	State Quarterfinalist
2004	3A D2	13	16-0	4-0	6-0	Jeff Traylor (175-26)	State Champion
2005	3A D2	13	10-2	4-0	1-1	Jeff Traylor (175-26)	
2006	3A D1	15	10-1	5-0	0-1	Jeff Traylor (175-26)	
2007	3A D1	15	14-1	5-0	4-1	Jeff Traylor (175-26)	State Runner Up
2008	3A D2	17	12-2	5-0	3-1	Jeff Traylor (175-26)	State Quarterfinalist
2009	3A D2	17	15-0	5-0	5-0	Jeff Traylor (175-26)	State Champion
2010	3A D2	16	9-4	4-1	2-1	Jeff Traylor (175-26)	
2011	3A D2	16	13-1	5-0	3-1	Jeff Traylor (175-26)	State Quarterfinalist
2012	3A D2	16	14-2	6-0	5-1	Jeff Traylor (175-26)	State Runner Up
2013	3A D2	16	11-2	5-1	2-1	Jeff Traylor (175-26)	
2014	4A D2	5	16-0	5-0	6-0	Jeff Traylor (175-26)	State Champion
2015	4A D2	5	14-1	5-0	4-1	Matt Turner (53-17)	State Semi-Finalist
2016	4A D2	7	13-2	5-0	4-1	Matt Turner (53-17)	State Semi-Finalist
2017	4A D2	7	10-3	4-1	2-1	Matt Turner (53-17)	
2018	4A D2	6	6-7	1-3	2-1	Matt Turner (53-17)	
2019	4A D2	6	10-4	3-1	3-1	Matt Turner (53-17)	State Quarterfinalist
2020	4A D2	8	14-2	5-0-	5-1	Alan Metzel (51-8)	State Runner Up
2021	4A D2	8	14-2	5-0	5-1	Alan Metzel (51-8)	State Runner Up
2022	4A D2	7	11-1	5-0	2-1	Alan Metzel (51-8)	
2023	4A D2	7	13-3	4-1	6-0	Alan Metzel (51-8)	State Champion
Totals			747-401-40	90-8 (Note: District record since 2004. Research into prior records is ongoing.)	101-33 (Note: Research into additional records is ongoing.)		

Playoffs in 1926, 1929, 1930, 1933, and 1941 were only played to the Regional level
Table references: MaxPreps, Texas High School Football History, and Lone Star Football.
