= Fernando Velasco (American football) =

American football player (born 1985)

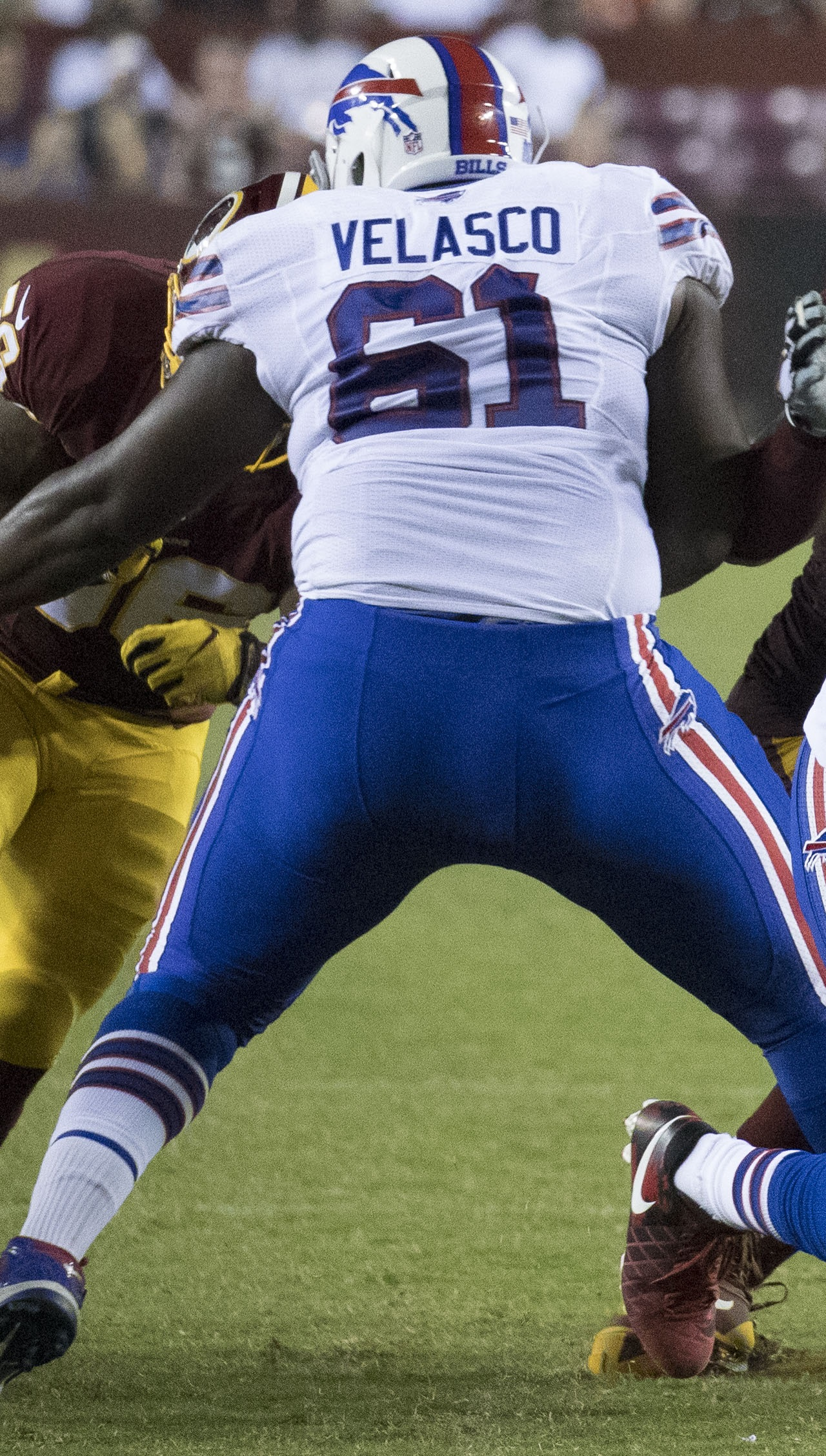
- Velasco with the Buffalo Bills in 2016

No. 61, 75
- Position: Center

Personal information
- Born: February 22, 1985 (age 41); Harris, New York, U.S.
- Listed height: 6 ft 4 in (1.93 m)
- Listed weight: 312 lb (142 kg)

Career information
- High school: Jefferson County (Louisville, Georgia)
- College: Georgia
- NFL draft: 2008: undrafted

Career history
- Tennessee Titans (2008–2012); Pittsburgh Steelers (2013); Carolina Panthers (2014); Tennessee Titans (2015)*; Carolina Panthers (2015); Buffalo Bills (2016)*
- * Offseason or practice squad member only

Awards and highlights
- Second-team All-SEC (2007)

Career NFL statistics
- Games played: 83
- Games started: 38
- Fumble recoveries: 1
- Stats at Pro Football Reference

Fernando Velasco (born February 22, 1985) is an American former professional football player who was a center in the National Football League (NFL). He was signed by the Tennessee Titans as an undrafted free agent in 2008 and was also a member of the Pittsburgh Steelers, Carolina Panthers and Buffalo Bills. He played college football for the Georgia Bulldogs.

== Early life ==
Velasco played offensive tackle for Jefferson County High School in Louisville, Georgia. During this time, he was a starter for all four years and was ranked in Rivals Top 75 Offensive Tackles in the Nation and Top 25 Offensive Tackles in Georgia. He was voted Class AAA First-team All-State by Atlanta Journal-Constitution and the Georgia Sportswriter Association.

== College career ==
After graduating from Jefferson County High School, Velasco chose to attend Georgia. As a freshman his role was a backup offensive lineman for the majority of the 2003 season. He did receive the Georgia Football Team's Iron Man Award for his dedication, and showing up to every practice on time.

After having a solid spring practice in 2004, Velasco was the number 2 split guard on the roster. He finally received his first career start against Vanderbilt. For the rest of his sophomore season he received playing time as a key backup lineman. He again was awarded the team's Ironman Award for the 2004 season.

During his junior year in 2005, Velasco was redshirted. Georgia also finally awarded Velasco with the Joseph F. Espy scholarship.

Velasco was voted the team's most improved player in 2006. After showing improvement he was the number 1 split guard on the Bulldog's football team. He graduated with a diploma in Health and Physical Education.

== Professional career ==
=== Tennessee Titans ===
After declaring for the 2008 NFL draft, Velasco was thought to possibly be a 6-7th round pick. After going undrafted he was signed by the Tennessee Titans and wore number 61. He only played in one game for the 2009 season.

During the 2010 season, Velasco played left guard and center in all 16 games, starting 3 of them. He had his first career start on October 10 in a 34–27 win over the Dallas Cowboys. For the 2011 season he didn't start any regular season games but played in all of them. In 2012, he would have a breakout year starting for the Titans at left guard and center for every regular season contest. He was ranked the 11th best center for the 2012 season.

=== Pittsburgh Steelers ===
After becoming a free agent after the 2012 season, he remained on the free agent market until Maurkice Pouncey of the Pittsburgh Steelers went down with a torn ACL in Week 1 of the regular season. After coming in and replacing Pouncey at Center, Velasco went down with an achilles tendon injury during a Thursday Night Football game against the Baltimore Ravens. He would be placed on injured reserved, being another lineman lost for the injury plagued Steelers 2013 season. He recorded 11 starts for the team that season and would become a free agent at the end of the season.

=== Carolina Panthers (first stint) ===
In July 2014, the Carolina Panthers announced the signing of Fernando Velasco. He would finally return to wearing his college number of 75 and would play Guard for the Panthers. Velasco would play both left guard and right guard for the Panthers, starting 7 games and playing in 13.

=== Tennessee Titans ===
On June 9, 2015, the Tennessee Titans signed Fernando Velasco, reuniting him with his original team. He was signed after the Titans drafted quarterback Marcus Mariota and after a horrible 2014 season by Brian Schwenke. Schwenke ranked 32nd among all centers in the NFL. The Titans brought in the five-year veteran to compete for the starting center job and protect the rookie quarterback. On August 30, 2015, it was reported that Velasco had been one of ten players waived from the team.

=== Carolina Panthers (second stint) ===
On September 17, 2015, Velasco was signed by the Panthers to play center and back up their four-time Pro Bowl center, Ryan Kalil. After an ankle injury to Kalil, Velasco would start the Week 8 contest against the Indianapolis Colts.

On February 7, 2016, Velasco was part of the Panthers team that played in Super Bowl 50. In the game, the Panthers fell to the Denver Broncos by a score of 24–10.

=== Buffalo Bills ===
On April 7, 2016, Velasco signed with the Buffalo Bills. On September 2, 2016, he was released by the Bills as part of final roster cuts.

== Coaching career ==
On June 2, 2017, Velasco was hired as player relations coordinator for the University of Georgia.
