= Kion Wilson =

American football player (born 1986)

No. 42, 91, 48
- Position: Linebacker

Personal information
- Born: October 24, 1986 (age 40); Jacksonville, Florida, U.S.
- Listed height: 6 ft 0 in (1.83 m)
- Listed weight: 232 lb (105 kg)

Career information
- High school: William M. Raines (Jacksonville)
- College: South Florida
- NFL draft: 2010: undrafted

Career history
- San Diego Chargers (2010); Carolina Panthers (2011); Pittsburgh Steelers (2013); San Francisco 49ers (2014)*; Arizona Cardinals (2014)*
- * Offseason or practice squad member only

Career NFL statistics
- Total tackles: 19
- Forced fumbles: 1
- Stats at Pro Football Reference

Kion Wilson (born October 24, 1986) is an American former professional football player who was a linebacker in the National Football League (NFL). He played college football for the South Florida Bulls. Shortly after the 2010 NFL draft ended, Wilson joined the San Diego Chargersas an undrafted free agent. He was born in Jacksonville, Florida and attended William M. Raines High School before playing weak side linebacker at Pearl River Community College in Poplarville, Mississippi. He has received multiple honors for his football career, including 2008 Rookie of the Year and 2009 CollegeFootballPerformance.com co-National Linebacker of the Week versus WVU.

== Early life ==
Wilson attended William M. Raines High School located in Jacksonville, Florida where he was rated as a four-star recruit by Scout.com and a three-star recruit by Rivals.com

== College career ==
Wilson played weak side linebacker at Pearl River Community College in Poplarville, MS. There he recorded 117 tackles, 2 interceptions and 6 sacks as a freshman. During nine games as a sophomore he recorded 98 tackles, 7 tackles for loss and one sack.

Prior to the Spring 2008 semester Wilson signed with The University of South Florida. He played in 13 games and started in 11. Wilson ranked 3rd on the team with 66 tackles during his first season as a Bull and also registered 3.5 tackles for loss, one sack, one forced fumble, two fumble recoveries and two pass break-ups. He piled up double-digit tackle numbers against Cincinnati (11), UConn (12) and West Virginia (11)

As a captain during Wilson's senior year, he played in all 12 games and led the team with 105 tackles, 9 tackles for loss and also had one sack, one force fumble, one fumble recovery, one interception and one pass breakup. Wilson recorded 12 or more tackles in four straight Big East games. With 18 tackles versus Rutgers, the second-most ever in a game in USF history

=== Honors ===
- 2009 First-team All-Big East selection by the Big East Coaches, ESPN.com, Phil Steele and Rivals.com
- 2009 Big East Defensive Player of the Week versus WVU
- 2009 CollegeFootballPerformance.com co-National Linebacker of the Week versus WVU
- 2009 Defensive Playmaker of the Year by USF coaches
- 2009 Defensive MVP by way of unanimous vote from teammates
- 2008 Rookie of the Year
- 2007 Defensive Player of the Year of the South

== Professional career ==
Pre-draft measurables
Height	Weight	Arm length	Hand span	40-yard dash	10-yard split	20-yard split	20-yard shuttle	Three-cone drill	Vertical jump	Broad jump	Bench press	Wonderlic
6 0 3/8	239 lb (108 kg)	32 1/2 in (0.83 m)	10 1/8 in (0.26 m)	4.87 s	1.63 s	2.73 s	4.55 s	7.47 s	36 1/2 in (0.93 m)	10 ft 3 in (3.12 m)	27 reps	16
All values from NFL Combine

After going undrafted in the 2010 NFL draft, Wilson signed with the San Diego Chargers as a rookie free agent on May 10, 2010. Though he was cut following training camp, he was signed to the team's practice squad, and was eventually promoted to the active roster on October 2 for their Week 4 game. He played in three games before suffering a season-ending ankle injury and being placed on the Injured Reserve List on October 23, 2010.

On September 3, 2011, the Chargers cut Wilson at the end of training camp. On October 4, 2011, he was signed by the Carolina Panthers to their practice squad, where he was reunited with his former defensive coordinator from the Chargers, Ron Rivera.

On November 16, 2011 Kion Wilson was added to the Panthers' active roster from the practice squad, for the final 7 weeks of the 2011 NFL season, playing in 5 games. Released by the Carolina Panthers on August 31, 2012, Kion Wilson signed a Reserve/Future contract with the Steelers on January 7, 2013.

On December 13, 2013, Wilson was waived by the Steelers. On July 24, 2014, Wilson was waived by the Steelers.

Wilson was signed by the 49ers on August 13, 2014. The 49ers waived Wilson on August 25, 2014.
