= Curtis Brown (cornerback) =

American football player (born 1988)

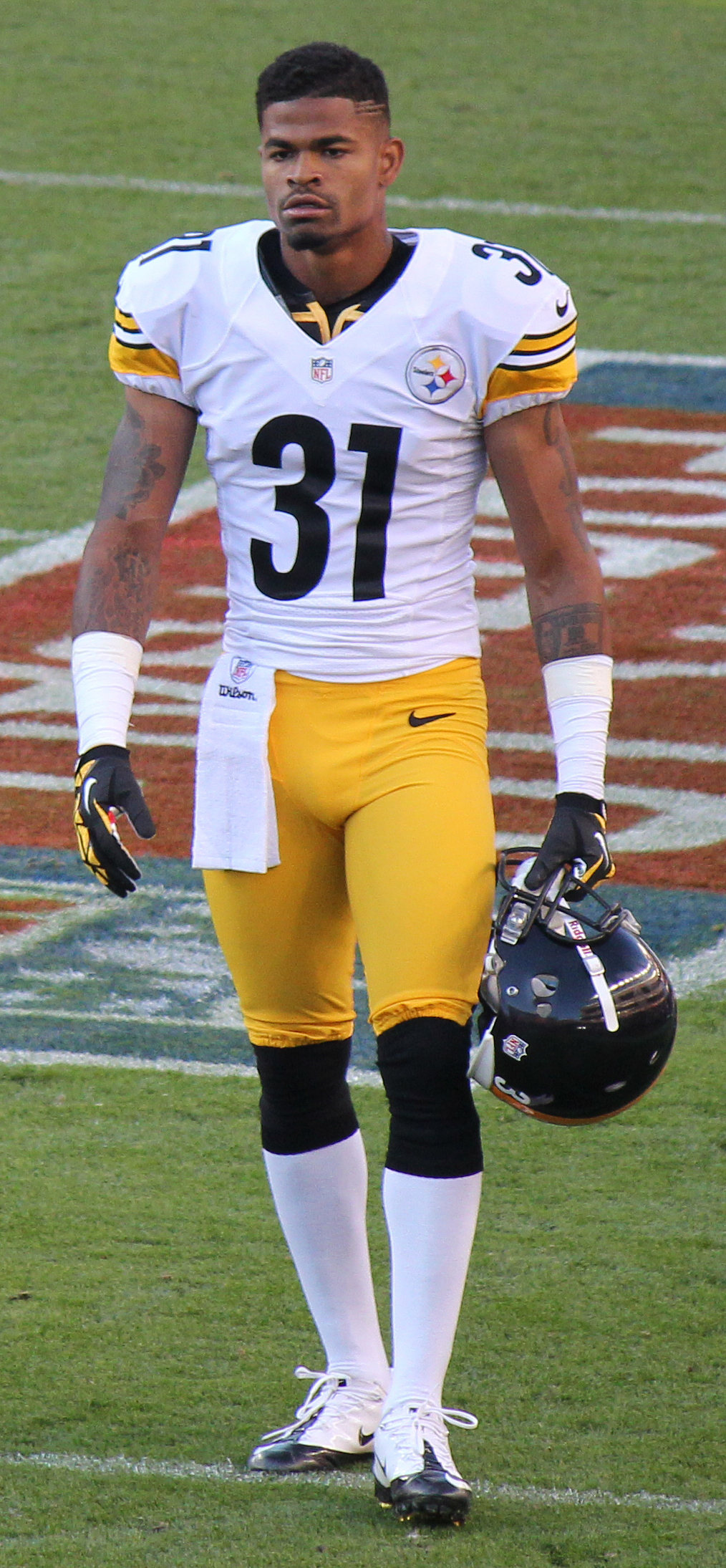
- Brown with the Pittsburgh Steelers in 2012

No. 31
- Position: Cornerback

Personal information
- Born: September 24, 1988 (age 38); Longview, Texas, U.S.
- Listed height: 6 ft 0 in (1.83 m)
- Listed weight: 185 lb (84 kg)

Career information
- High school: Gilmer (TX)
- College: Texas
- NFL draft: 2011: 3rd round, 95th overall pick

Career history
- Pittsburgh Steelers (2011–2013); New York Jets (2015)*; Saskatchewan Roughriders (2016)*
- * Offseason or practice squad member only

Career NFL statistics
- Total tackles: 49
- Forced fumbles: 1
- Pass deflections: 1
- Stats at Pro Football Reference

Curtis Jamall Brown (born September 24, 1988) is an American former professional football player who was a cornerback in the National Football League (NFL). He played college football for the Texas Longhorns where he helped them reach the 2010 BCS National Championship game. He was selected in the third round of the 2011 NFL draft by the Pittsburgh Steelers, played three seasons for them and also spent time with the New York Jets and Saskatchewan Roughriders.

== Early life ==
Brown played high school football at Gilmer, Texas, along with fellow high school stars Manuel Johnson, Justin Johnson, G. J. Kinne, and David Snow. He starred at both CB and WR, winning a state championship in 2004 as a sophomore. He was ranked as a 5-star prospect by most major recruiting sites, and chose to attend the University of Texas.

== College career ==
Brown played cornerback at the University of Texas from 2007 to 2010. He started playing as a freshman and helped the Longhorns to win the Holiday Bowl that year, while playing in all 13 games. In his sophomore year, the Longhorns went 12-1, finished ranked #3/#4 won a share of the Big-12 South and the Fiesta Bowl, but missed out on the Big 12 Championship, and a shot at the National Championship, by the 5th tie-breaker.

As a junior in 2009, Brown was named an honorable mention All-Big 12 Conference player by Pro Football Weekly and the Associated Press. The Longhorns won the Big 12 Championship and went to the BCS Championship for only the 2nd time in school history, which they lost to Alabama.

In his senior year, he was named 2nd team All-Big 12.

He finished his career at Texas with 105 tackles, 2 forced fumbles, a blocked punt and 2 interceptions, both of which were returned for over 70 yards and resulted in one touchdown.

Following his senior year, he participated in the 2010 Senior Bowl.

== Professional career ==
Pre-draft measurables
Height	Weight	Arm length	Hand span	Wingspan	40-yard dash	10-yard split	20-yard split	20-yard shuttle	Three-cone drill	Vertical jump	Broad jump	Bench press
5 ft 11 5/8 in (1.82 m)	185 lb (84 kg)	32 1/4 in (0.82 m)	9 1/2 in (0.24 m)	6 ft 3 3/4 in (1.92 m)	4.54 s	1.63 s	2.65 s	4.00 s	6.59 s	39.5 in (1.00 m)	10 ft 8 in (3.25 m)	10 reps
All values from NFL Combine

=== Pittsburgh Steelers ===
Brown was selected by the Pittsburgh Steelers of the National Football League in the 3rd round, 95th overall in the 2011 NFL draft. He played in 34 games over three seasons, but he spent time in each season on the injured reserve. He was released by the Steelers on March 5, 2014, along with Levi Brown and Larry Foote, after failing to pass his physical. The release came after Brown played in only seven games and recorded just seven tackles before tearing his anterior cruciate ligament.

=== New York Jets ===
Brown was signed by the New York Jets on February 10, 2015. He was waived by the Jets on August 30.

=== Saskatchewan Roughriders ===
On January 19, 2016, Brown signed with the Saskatchewan Roughriders of the Canadian Football League. However, he was cut prior to the start of the season on May 29.

== Personal life ==
Brown's uncle, Hosea Taylor, played in the National Football League for the Baltimore Colts from 1981 to 1983.
