= Manuel Johnson =

American football player (born 1986)

No. 15
- Position: Wide receiver

Personal information
- Born: October 14, 1986 (age 40); Gilmer, Texas, U.S.
- Listed height: 6 ft 0 in (1.83 m)
- Listed weight: 183 lb (83 kg)

Career information
- High school: Gilmer (TX)
- College: Oklahoma
- NFL draft: 2009: 7th round, 229th overall pick

Career history
- Dallas Cowboys (2009–2010)

Career NFL statistics
- Receptions: 1
- Receiving yards: 6
- Stats at Pro Football Reference

Manuel Johnson (born October 14, 1986) is a former wide receiver in the National Football League (NFL) for the Dallas Cowboys. He played college football at the University of Oklahoma.

== Early life ==
Johnson attended North Garland High School as a freshman, where he suffered a broken ankle. He transferred to Gilmer High School as a sophomore. He was a backup wide receiver and saw limited playing time.

As a junior, he was named a starter at wide receiver, setting school single-season receiving records with 81 receptions for 1,400 yards and 13 touchdowns, while helping the team reach the state quarterfinal game. He received All-state honors.

As a senior, he was switched to quarterback, setting school single-season passing records with 273-of-404 completions for 4,098 yards, 48 passing touchdowns, 1,030 rushing yards and 15 rushing touchdowns. He led the team to a 14–0 record and its first Class 3A Division II state championship. He received All-state, Dave Campbell Player of the Year, MVP District 13-AAA and MVP All East Texas honors. He was the No. 13 ranked wide receiver in the nation by Rivals.com.

Johnson finished his high school career with 1,440, receiving yards, 4,098 passing yards, 48 passing touchdowns, 18 rushing touchdowns and 16 receiving touchdowns.

He also competed in basketball and track. He won state titles in both the long jump and triple jump.

== College career ==
Johnson accepted a football scholarship from the University of Oklahoma. As a true freshman, he appeared in 10 games (one start), registering 10 receptions for 170 yards and one touchdown (a 55-yard reception).

As a sophomore, he started 5 out of 12 games, collecting 36 receptions for 378 yards and 3 touchdowns. He missed the eleventh game against Baylor University with a concussion.

As a junior, he started 7 out of 14 games, making 31 receptions for 448 yards and 4 touchdowns. Seventeen of his 27 receptions and 341 of his 423 receiving yards came in the last five contests. He tallied 4 receptions for 126 yards and 2 touchdowns against Baylor University. His 4 touchdown receptions came in back-to-back games against Baylor University and Texas Tech University. He had his first career pass attempt and completion against the University of Miami, hitting Malcolm Kelly on a 25-yarder.

As a senior, he started all 13 games, posting 42 receptions for 714 yards and 9 touchdowns. He was limited with a dislocated left elbow he suffered in the seventh game against the University of Kansas. He was the team's third leading receiver behind Juaquin Iglesias and Jermaine Gresham. In the season opener against the University of Tennessee at Chattanooga, he tallied 9 receptions for 120 yards and one touchdown. Against Texas Christian University he had 5 receptions for a school record 206 yards and 3 touchdowns (covering 76, 55 and 63 yards), joining Antonio Perkins as the only two players in school history to have three scoring plays of 55-plus yards in one game. He played in the 2009 BCS National Championship Game, where the Sooners lost 14–24 to the Florida Gators. He finished his college career with 26 starts out of 49 games, 119 receptions for 1,710 yards and 17 touchdowns.

== Professional career ==
Johnson was selected by the Dallas Cowboys in the seventh round (229th overall) of the 2009 NFL draft. He was released on September 5 and signed to the practice squad the next day, after the team decided to instead keep undrafted free agent Kevin Ogletree.

In 2010, he was one of the last cuts and was signed again to the practice squad on September 6. He was promoted to the active roster on December 15 and played in 2 games. He was waived on September 3, 2011.
