= David Snow (American football) =

American football player (born 1989)

No. 61
- Position: Center / Guard

Personal information
- Born: November 9, 1989 (age 36); Longview, Texas, U.S.
- Listed height: 6 ft 4 in (1.93 m)
- Listed weight: 303 lb (137 kg)

Career information
- High school: Gilmer (TX)
- College: Texas
- NFL draft: 2012: undrafted

Career history
- Buffalo Bills (2012); Pittsburgh Steelers (2013)

Awards and highlights
- Second-team All-Big 12 (2011)

Career NFL statistics
- Games played: 5
- Games started: 2
- Stats at Pro Football Reference

David Snow (born November 9, 1989) is an American former professional football player who was an offensive lineman in the National Football League (NFL). He was originally signed by the Buffalo Bills as an undrafted free agent in 2012. He played college football for the Texas Longhorns. He is now a restaurant operator at a Chick-fil-A in Marshall, Texas.

== Professional career ==
=== Buffalo Bills ===
Snow was signed by the Buffalo Bills on April 30, 2012. He was released by the Bills on October 15, 2012, and re-signed to the Bills' practice squad on October 16, 2012. He was released by the Bills on August 30, 2013.
