= Jonathan Luigs =

American football player (born 1986)

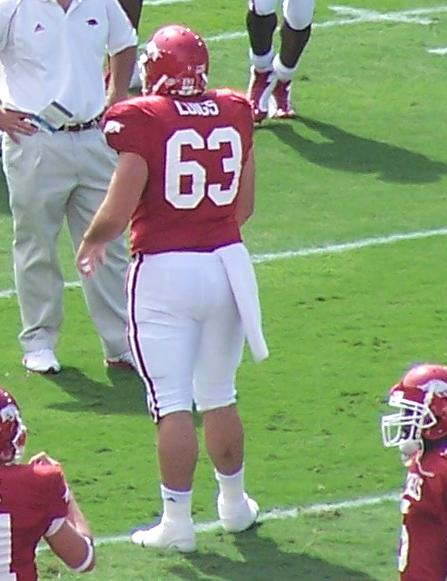
- Luigs with the Arkansas Razorbacks in 2006

No. 50
- Position: Center

Personal information
- Born: August 11, 1986 (age 40); Little Rock, Arkansas, U.S.
- Listed height: 6 ft 3 in (1.91 m)
- Listed weight: 303 lb (137 kg)

Career information
- High school: Pulaski (Little Rock)
- College: Arkansas (2004–2008)
- NFL draft: 2009: 4th round, 106th overall pick

Career history
- Cincinnati Bengals (2009)

Awards and highlights
- Rimington Trophy (2007); Consensus All-American (2007); Third-team All-American (2006); Jacobs Blocking Trophy (2007); 2× First-team All-SEC (2006, 2007); Second-team All-SEC (2008)

Career NFL statistics
- Games played: 8
- Stats at Pro Football Reference

Jonathan Luigs (born August 11, 1986) is an American former professional football player who was a center in the National Football League (NFL). Luigs played college football for the Arkansas Razorbacks, earning consensus All-American honors, and winning the 2007 Rimington Trophy. He was selected by the Cincinnati Bengals in the fourth round of the 2009 NFL draft, and only played for a single season.

== Early life ==
Luigs was born in Little Rock, Arkansas. He attended Pulaski Academy in Little Rock, where he was a three-year starter on the offensive line, playing both center and offensive tackle as well as defensive end. He graded out at 90 percent or better in blocking in each of his three varsity seasons. In his senior season, Luigs helped Pulaski to win its first state championship (3A) in school history with a 13–2 mark. He was subsequently named to the Associated Press Arkansas Super Team and the Arkansas Democrat-Gazette All-Arkansas Team.

Considered only a two-star recruit by Rivals.com, Luigs was not listed among the nation's top offensive line prospects. In fact, he wasn't even listed as one of the top 10 prospects in Arkansas. As a result, he was not heavily recruited out of high school. He eventually picked Arkansas over an offer from LSU. ESPN′s Chris Low would later pick Luigs for his "All-SEC recruiting nobodies" team.

== College career ==
Luigs attended the University of Arkansas, where he played for the Arkansas razorbacks football team from 2004 to 2007. After redshirting as a true freshman in 2004, he became a starter on the Razorbacks offensive line at right guard after Robert Felton moved from guard to right tackle. After occasionally filling the void at center for an ailing Kyle Roper, Luigs started seven games at right guard and three games at center. Arkansas racked up 216.9 yards rushing per game to lead the SEC and ranked 12th nationally. The Hogs boasted a total of ten 100-yard rushing performances on the season, including five 100-yard efforts from SEC Freshman of the Year Darren McFadden.

In his sophomore campaign, Luigs established himself as one of the top centers in the nation. He was at the center of an offensive front that cleared the way for thirteen 100-yard rushing performances in 14 games and allowed only nine sacks in 14 games (0.64) to rank second nationally in fewest sacks allowed. In addition, for only the third time in SEC history, Arkansas featured two 1,000-yard running backs in Darren McFadden and Felix Jones on the same team. Luigs was a finalist for the 2006 Dave Rimington Trophy, awarded to college football's best center, but lost out to Dan Mozes. He also earned third-team All-America honors from the Associated Press and first-team sophomore All-America honors from College Football News.

As a junior, Luigs was the centerpiece of an offensive line that helped Arkansas lead the Southeastern Conference (SEC) and rank fourth in the nation in rushing (286.5), rank second in the SEC and No. 17 in the nation in total offense. He had a team-leading overall grade of 90.36 for the season, including marks of 86.0 on running plays and a team-best 96.9 on passing plays. He also had 55 knockdown blocks, which ranked second on the team. Luigs was named to numerous All-America teams following his junior season in 2007, and on December 6, 2007, was named as the winner of the 2007 Rimington Trophy.

Finishing his career with a string of 49 consecutive starts, Luigs was again named a finalist for the Rimington Trophy. He delivered 66 knockdowns and graded 85.42 percent for blocking consistency. However, Arkansas offensive line was the main problem all season, as they placed 118th among the 119 major colleges, allowing 46 quarterback sacks for the season.

== Professional career ==
Regardless of his up-and-down senior season at Arkansas, Luigs was considered one of the best centers available in the 2009 NFL draft. He drew comparisons to Ryan Kalil, and was projected a third-round pick.

Pre-draft measurables
Height	Weight	40-yard dash	10-yard split	20-yard split	20-yard shuttle	Three-cone drill	Vertical jump	Broad jump	Bench press
6 ft 3 1/2 in (1.92 m)	301 lb (137 kg)	5.14 s	1.78 s	2.90 s	4.79 s	7.69 s	31 in (0.79 m)	8 ft 03 in (2.51 m)	26 reps
All values from NFL Combine

Luigs was selected by the Bengals in the fourth round, 106th overall, of the 2009 NFL draft. He signed a four-year, $2.26 million deal with a $509,000 signing bonus. A backup to Kyle Cook in the 2009 NFL season, Luigs played in eight games for the Bengals before being waived on August 17, 2010, after one season with the team.
