= Craig Steltz =

American football player (born 1986)

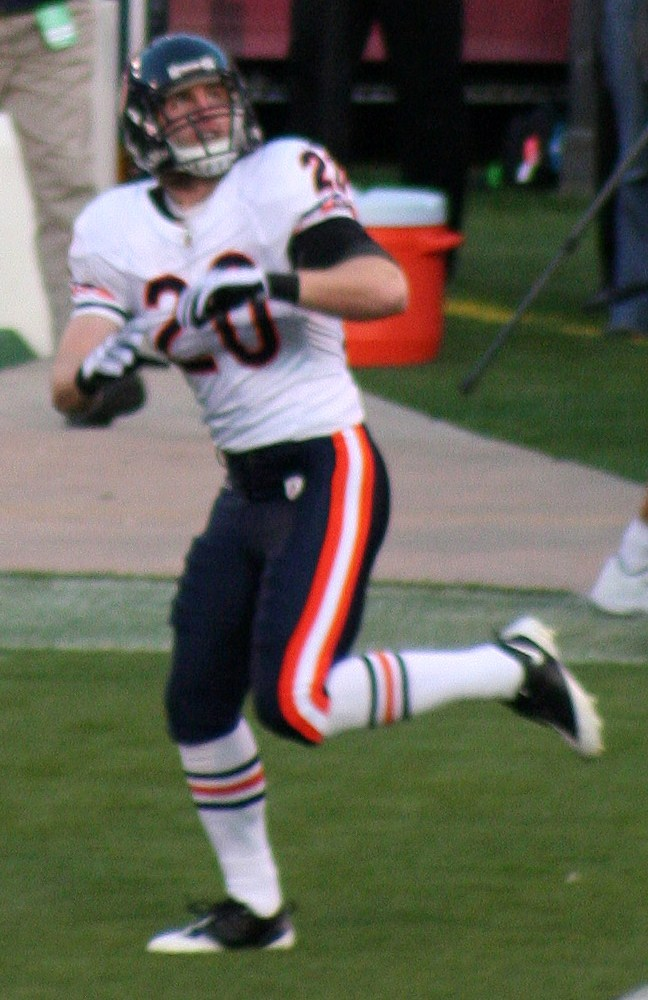
- Steltz with the Chicago Bears in 2009

No. 20
- Position: Safety

Personal information
- Born: May 7, 1986 (age 40); Metairie, Louisiana, U.S.
- Listed height: 6 ft 1 in (1.85 m)
- Listed weight: 210 lb (95 kg)

Career information
- High school: Archbishop Rummel (Metairie)
- College: LSU
- NFL draft: 2008: 4th round, 120th overall pick

Career history
- Chicago Bears (2008–2013)

Awards and highlights
- BCS national champion (2007); Consensus All-American (2007); First-team All-SEC (2007)

Career NFL statistics
- Total tackles: 122
- Sacks: 1
- Forced fumbles: 4
- Fumble recoveries: 1
- Interceptions: 1
- Stats at Pro Football Reference

Craig Joseph Steltz (born May 7, 1986) is an American former professional football player who was a safety in the National Football League (NFL). He played college football for the LSU Tigers, earning consensus All-American honors in 2007. He was selected by the Chicago Bears in the fourth round with the 120th overall pick in the 2008 NFL draft.

== Early life ==
Steltz was born in Metairie, Louisiana. He attended Archbishop Rummel High School in Metairie, and was an honors graduate. He was originally a running back, but switched to safety in eighth grade. Steltz excelled as a safety and started one game on the varsity team during his freshman year, before becoming a full-time starter his sophomore year. He is the first player in school history to have his jersey retired. He wore #10 in high school. On April 25, 2008, Steltz's jersey was officially retired during a school-wide assembly in the Archbishop Rummel High School gymnasium.

He was a first-team all-state safety in 2002 as a junior. Steltz has the reputation of a hard hitter who works diligently in the weight room. In his junior year of high school, he recorded 120 tackles and nine interceptions. Craig was again named a first-team 5A all-state safety in 2003 as a senior. Steltz was also named Louisiana Class 5A Defensive Player of the Year in 2003. He finished his senior year with 30 tackles and two sacks, despite suffering from two nagging injuries. He was a team captain who led a ferocious defensive unit that spearheaded the Raiders to an 8–2 district championship season and regional round playoff berth. This defensive unit has had seven players play Division-I college football.

Craig showed his versatility by returning punts and kickoffs and by playing running back. On October 31, 2003, against district rival Jesuit High School, Steltz rushed for 170 yards in the second half on seven carries and scored three touchdowns and a two-point conversion in the fourth quarter to lead the Raiders to a 38–27 victory.

=== Awards and honors ===
- 2002 Louisiana All-State First-team
- 2003 Louisiana All-State First-team
- 2004 Rufus Award- given to the school's top athlete

== College career ==
Steltz enrolled at Louisiana State University, where he played for the LSU Tigers football team from 2004 to 2007. During the 2004 season, Steltz saw limited playing time in only four games. In 2005, Steltz scored his first career touchdown on a blocked punt return against Arizona State. After providing valuable depth and starting six games during the 2005 and 2006 seasons, Steltz finally became a starter for the 2007 season. He was a first-team All-SEC selection and was recognized as a consensus first-team All-American in 2007, receiving first-team All-America honors from the Associated Press, Football Writers Association of American (FWAA), Walter Camp Football Foundation, Sports Illustrated, ESPN, CBS Sports, College Football News, Rivals.com, and Scout.com. He was also named a Jim Thorpe Award finalist.

=== Statistics ===
Year	G-S	UT	AT	TT	TFL	SACKS	INT	PD	QBH	FR	FF
2004	4–0	0	1	1	0	0	0	0	0	0	0
2005	13–3	26	13	39	0	0	0–0	2	3	0	0
2006	13–3	20	22	42	2–14	1–9	4–111	8	1	0	0
2007	14–14	63	38	101	5–20	1–8	6–153	13	0	0	3
Totals	44–20	109	73	182	7–34	2–17	10–264	23	4	0	3

=== Awards and honors ===
- 2007 Sporting News All-Spring Team
- 2007 Alvin Roy Fourth Quarter Award
- 2007 Mike Miley Leadership Award
- 2007 Louisiana Defensive Player of the Week (Aug 30 at Mississippi State)
- 2007 SEC Defensive Player of the Week (Nov 17 vs. Ole Miss)
- 2007 Jim Thorpe Award Finalist
- 2007 All-SEC Coaches First-team
- 2007 College Football All-America Team (first-team) by: Associated Press, Football Writers Association of America, Walter Camp Football Foundation, Sports Illustrated, ESPN, CBS Sports, College Football News, Rivals.com, and Scout.com

== Professional career ==
General Manager Jerry Angelo originally intended for Steltz to be the team's starting free safety for the 2009 NFL season. Instead, he began the season third on the depth chart at the position. He was a frequent contributor on the Bears' special teams unit.

In the 2011 season, after injuries to Major Wright and Chris Conte, Steltz became a valuable contributor to the defense, recording 38 tackles, behind Pro Bowlers Brian Urlacher, who has 92, and Lance Briggs, who has 100. Steltz also finished fourth on the Bears with 12 special-team tackles. In 2012, Steltz was resigned to a 2-year contract, being the fifth Bears player to sign with the team, with Tim Jennings, Josh McCown, Kellen Davis and Israel Idonije being the first four. Steltz was placed on injured reserve on December 11 after an injury in Week 14.

Steltz was released on August 25, 2014.
