= 2007 All-SEC football team =

American college football all-star team

The 2007 All-SEC football team consists of American football players selected to the All-Southeastern Conference (SEC) chosen by the Associated Press (AP) and the conference coaches for the 2007 college football season.

The LSU Tigers won the conference, beating the Tennessee Volunteers 21 to 14 in the SEC Championship Game. The Tigers then won a national championship, defeating the Big Ten champion Ohio State Buckeyes 38 to 24 in the BCS National Championship Game.

Florida quarterback Tim Tebow, AP selection, won Heisman Trophy, the first sophomore to do so. He also won the AP SEC Offensive Player of the Year. Arkansas running back Darren McFadden, a unanimous selection by both the AP and the coaches and repeat winner of the Doak Walker Award as the nation's top running back, was the coaches Offensive Player of the Year. LSU defensive tackle Glenn Dorsey, a unanimous selection by both the AP and the coaches, was the unanimous Defensive Player of the Year. He also won the Lombardi Award and Nagurski Trophy.

== Offensive selections ==
=== Quarterbacks ===
- Tim Tebow*, Florida (AP-1, Coaches-1)
- Andre Woodson, Kentucky (AP-2, Coaches-2)

=== Running backs ===
- Darren McFadden†, Arkansas (AP-1, Coaches-1)
- Knowshon Moreno, Georgia (AP-1, Coaches-1)
- Felix Jones, Arkansas (AP-2, Coaches-2)
- Arian Foster, Tennessee (AP-2)
- Jacob Hester, LSU (Coaches-2)

=== Wide receivers ===
- Kenny McKinley, South Carolina (AP-1, Coaches-1)
- Earl Bennett, Vanderbilt (AP-1, Coaches-1)
- Percy Harvin, Florida (AP-2, Coaches-2)
- Lucas Taylor, Tennessee (AP-2)
- D. J. Hall, Alabama (Coaches-2)

=== Centers ===
- Jonathan Luigs, Arkansas (AP-1, Coaches-1)
- Fernando Velasco, Georgia (AP-2, Coaches-2)

=== Guards ===
- Chris Williams, Vanderbilt (AP-1, Coaches-1)
- Anthony Parker, Tennessee (AP-1, Coaches-1)
- Robert Felton, Arkansas (AP-1, Coaches-1)
- Herman Johnson, LSU (AP-2, Coaches-1)
- Nate Garner, Arkansas (AP-2, Coaches-2)
- Jason Leger, Kentucky (AP-2)
- Mitch Petrus, Arkansas (Coaches-2)
- Jim Tartt, Florida (Coaches-2)

=== Tackles ===
- Michael Oher, Ole Miss (AP-1, Coaches-1)
- Andre Smith, Alabama (AP-1, Coaches-1)
- Eric Young, Tennessee (AP-2)
- Ciron Black, LSU (Coaches-2)
- Garry Williams, Kentucky (Coaches-2)
- Carlton Medder, Florida (Coaches-2)
- Michael Brown, Miss. St. (Coaches-2)

=== Tight ends ===
- Jacob Tamme*, Kentucky (AP-1, Coaches-1)
- Cornelius Ingram, Florida (AP-2, Coaches-2)

== Defensive selections ==
=== Defensive ends ===
- Greg Hardy, Ole Miss (AP-1, Coaches-1)
- Wallace Gilberry, Alabama (AP-1, Coaches-1)
- Quentin Groves, Auburn (AP-2, Coaches-1)
- Eric Norwood, South Carolina (AP-2, Coaches-1)
- Titus Brown, Miss. St (AP-2, Coaches-2)
- Derrick Harvey, Florida (Coaches-2)

=== Defensive tackles ===
- Glenn Dorsey†, LSU (AP-1, Coaches-1)
- Geno Atkins, Georgia (AP-1)
- Pat Sims, Auburn (AP-1)
- Marcus Harrison, Arkansas (AP-2)
- Peria Jerry, Ole Miss (AP-2)
- Jeremy Jarmon, Kentucky (Coaches-2)

=== Linebackers ===
- Wesley Woodyard#, Kentucky (AP-1, Coaches-1)
- Ali Highsmith#, LSU (AP-1, Coaches-1)
- Jerod Mayo, Tennessee (AP-1, Coaches-1)
- Brandon Spikes, Florida (AP-1, Coaches-1)
- Jonathan Goff, Vanderbilt (AP-2, Coaches-2)
- Rico McCoy, Tennessee (AP-2, Coaches-2)
- Dannell Ellerbe, Georgia (AP-2, Coaches-2)
- Darry Beckwith, LSU (Coaches-2)
- Jamar Chaney, Miss. St. (Coaches-2)

=== Cornerbacks ===
- Chevis Jackson, LSU (AP-1, Coaches-1)
- D. J. Moore, Vanderbilt (AP-1, Coaches-2)
- Captain Munnerlyn, South Carolina (AP-2, Coaches-1)
- Simeon Castille, Alabama (Coaches-1)

=== Safeties ===
- Craig Steltz, LSU (AP-1, Coaches-1)
- Rashad Johnson, Alabama (AP-1, Coaches-1)
- Derek Pegues, Miss. St. (AP-1, Coaches-2)
- Jonathan Hefney, Tennessee (Coaches-1)
- Michael Grant, Arkansas (AP-2, Coaches-2)
- Emanuel Cook, South Carolina (AP-2, Coaches-2)
- Eric Berry, Tennessee (AP-2, Coaches-2)
- Pat Lee, Auburn (AP-2)
- Matt Hewitt, Arkansas (AP-2)

== Special teams ==
=== Kickers ===
- Colt David, LSU (AP-1, Coaches-1)
- Daniel Lincoln, Tennessee (AP-2, Coaches-2)

=== Punters ===
- Patrick Fisher, LSU (AP-1, Coaches-1)
- Ryan Shoemaker, Auburn (AP-2, Coaches-2)
- Britton Colquitt, Tennessee (Coaches-2)

=== All purpose/return specialist ===
- Felix Jones, Arkansas (AP-1, Coaches-1)
- Percy Harvin, Florida (AP-1)
- Brandon James, Florida (AP-2, Coaches-2)

== Key ==
Bold: Consensus first-team selection by both the coaches and AP
AP: Associated Press
Coaches: Selected by the SEC coaches
*Unanimous selection of AP
#Unanimous selection of Coaches
†Unanimous selection of both AP and Coaches

== See also ==
- 2007 College Football All-America Team
