= Glenn Dorsey =

American football player (born 1985)

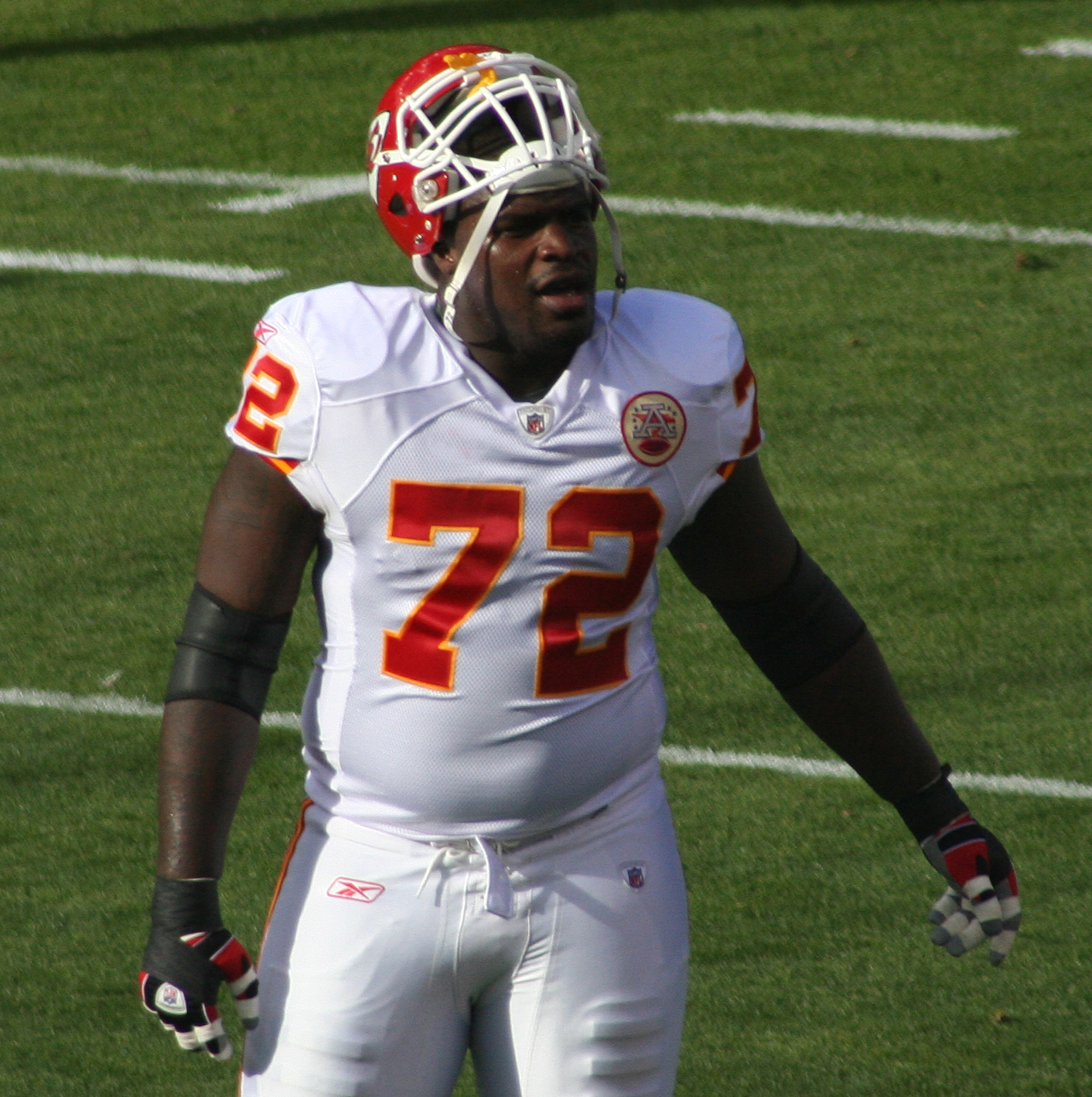
- Dorsey with the Kansas City Chiefs in 2010

No. 72, 90
- Position: Nose tackle

Personal information
- Born: August 1, 1985 (age 41); Baton Rouge, Louisiana, U.S.
- Listed height: 6 ft 1 in (1.85 m)
- Listed weight: 297 lb (135 kg)

Career information
- High school: East Ascension (Gonzales, Louisiana)
- College: LSU (2004–2007)
- NFL draft: 2008: 1st round, 5th overall pick

Career history
- Kansas City Chiefs (2008–2012); San Francisco 49ers (2013–2016)

Awards and highlights
- BCS national champion (2007); Lombardi Award (2007); Outland Trophy (2007); Bronko Nagurski Trophy (2007); Lott Trophy (2007); SEC Defensive Player of the Year (2007); Unanimous All-American (2007); First-team All-American (2006); 2× First-team All-SEC (2006, 2007)

Career NFL statistics
- Total tackles: 321
- Sacks: 7
- Forced fumbles: 1
- Fumble recoveries: 4
- Pass deflections: 3
- Stats at Pro Football Reference
- College Football Hall of Fame

Glenn Jamon Dorsey (born August 1, 1985) is an American former professional football player who was a defensive tackle in the National Football League (NFL). He played college football for the LSU Tigers, receiving All-American honors twice and earning recognition as the top college defensive player of the 2007 season. He was selected by the Kansas City Chiefs with the fifth overall pick in the 2008 NFL draft, and played for the San Francisco 49ers later in his career as well.

== Early life ==
Dorsey was raised in Gonzales, Louisiana. He attended East Ascension High School in Gonzales, where he was rated among the nation's top defensive linemen and one of the top three prospects in the state. He was named Louisiana’s 4A Defensive Player of the Year and a first-team 4A all-state selection. During his junior year, Dorsey had more than 100 tackles, and 12 sacks. As a senior, he missed three games due to an ankle injury, and finished the season with 43 tackles, two sacks and one forced fumble.

Considered a four-star recruit by Rivals.com, Dorsey was listed as the No. 5 defensive tackle prospect in the nation in 2004. Dorsey committed to Louisiana State on the eve of his junior season.

== College career ==
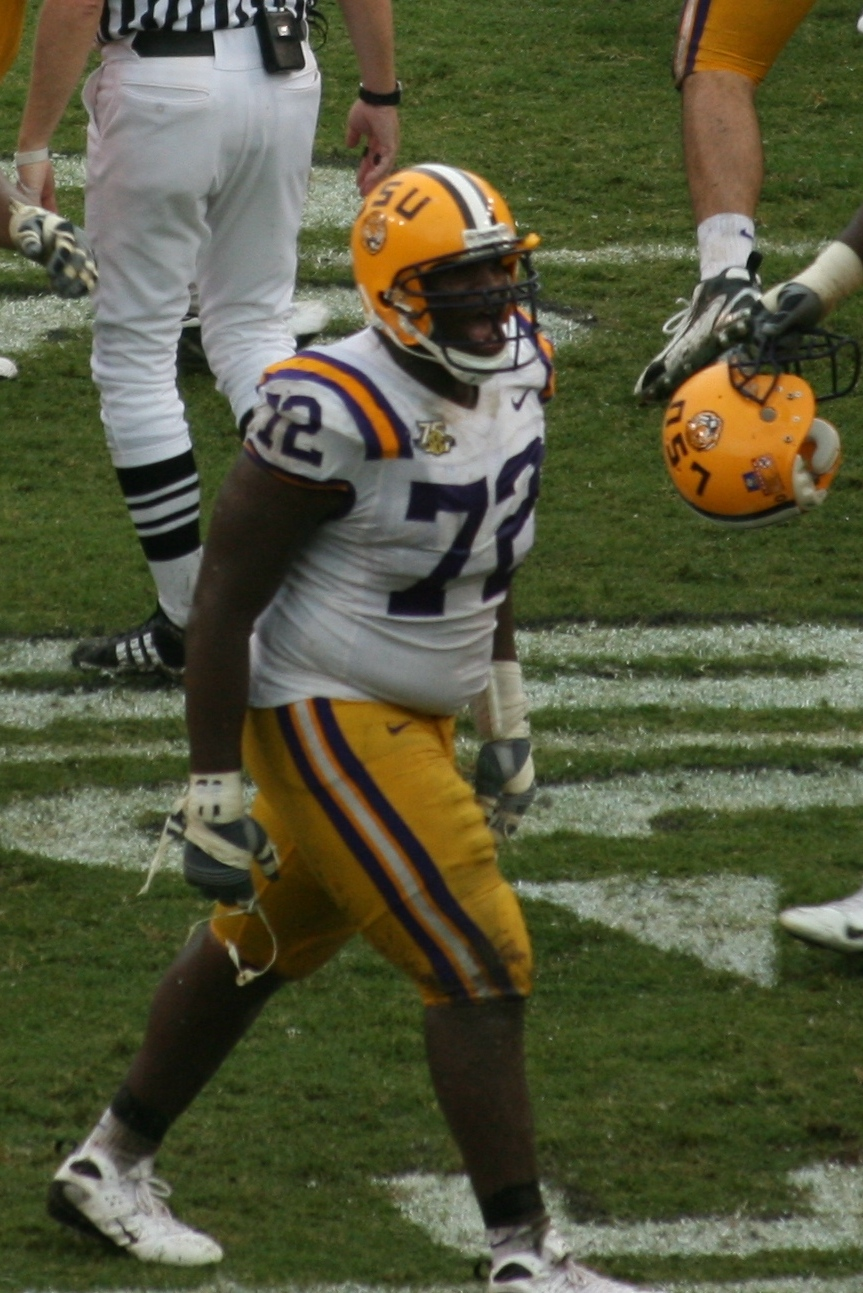
Dorsey playing for the LSU Tigers

Dorsey attended Louisiana State University, and played for coach Nick Saban and coach Les Miles's LSU Tigers football teams from 2004 to 2007. As a true freshman in the 2004 season, he started in three out of 12 games. On his first collegiate snap he recovered a fumble against Oregon State. He finished the year with 18 tackles.

In 2005, he started in one out of 13 games. He was among LSU's four-player rotation at defensive tackle which included Claude Wroten and Kyle Williams. He finished the season with 28 tackles and 3 sacks.

In 2006, Dorsey was named to the 2006 All-American team and was All-SEC. He finished the season as the Tigers' third-leading tackler with 64 stops, including 8.5 for losses and three sacks. Dorsey was named the SEC Defensive Lineman of the Week twice during the season.

In 2007, Dorsey started 13 of 14 games recording 69 tackles, 7 sacks, 12.5 tackles for loss, three passes defensed, and a forced fumble. He was also named the SEC Defensive Player of the Week twice during the season. Following the 2007 season, he was recognized as a unanimous first-team All-American. He also finished ninth in the 2007 voting for the Heisman Trophy, receiving more votes than any other defensive player in the nation. In addition, Dorsey was awarded the Bronko Nagurski Trophy, the Outland Trophy, the Lott Trophy and the Lombardi Award, becoming the only player to win all four awards. Dorsey was a member of LSU's 2007 BCS Championship team. He was a key component in LSU’s drive to the BCS national title despite playing the second half of the season with knee and tailbone injuries.

== Professional career ==
=== Pre-draft ===
Prior to the draft some NFL teams expressed concern over a lingering stress fracture Dorsey sustained in 2006. At the NFL Combine, Dorsey spent nearly ten hours getting examined at an Indianapolis hospital.

Pre-draft measurables
Height	Weight	Arm length	Hand span	40-yard dash	10-yard split	20-yard split	20-yard shuttle	Three-cone drill	Vertical jump	Broad jump	Bench press	Wonderlic
6 ft 1 1/2 in (1.87 m)	297 lb (135 kg)	35 1/4 in (0.90 m)	10 in (0.25 m)	5.12 s	1.74 s	2.98 s	4.80 s	7.52 s	25.5 in (0.65 m)	8 ft 4 in (2.54 m)	27 reps	21
All values from LSU Pro Day (March 26, 2008) except height, weight, and Wonderlic from NFL Combine. Prior to the NFL Combine Dorsey had reported 40-yard times between 4.98–5.09 seconds.

=== Kansas City Chiefs ===
Dorsey was selected by the Kansas City Chiefs in the first round with the fifth overall pick in the 2008 NFL draft. On July 26, 2008, he signed a five-year, $51 million contract with $23 million guaranteed.

On November 8, he recorded his first career sack against San Diego Chargers quarterback Philip Rivers. He finished his rookie season with 46 tackles and one sack.

When the Chiefs shifted to a 3–4 defense under new head coach Todd Haley, Dorsey switched positions to accommodate the scheme change, and he played defensive end. Dorsey started 14 of 15 games during the 2009 season and had 54 tackles and one sack. In 2010, he started all 16 games and had 69 tackles and two sacks. In 2011, Dorsey had 62 tackles, but no sacks.

=== San Francisco 49ers ===
On March 13, 2013, Dorsey signed a two-year deal with the San Francisco 49ers. Dorsey was expected to be a reserve, but following the injury to starting nose tackle Ian Williams in week two, Dorsey took over the starting job. Dorsey signed a two-year extension with San Francisco on August 19, 2014. He missed the 2014 season with a torn biceps injury. On November 25, 2015, Dorsey was placed on injured reserve with a torn ACL. In the 2016 season, he played in 12 games and started seven. He finished with one sack and 24 total tackles.

== Career statistics ==
=== NFL ===
Year	Team	GP	GS	Tackles				Fum & Int			
Year	Team	GP	GS	Cmb	Solo	Ast	Sck	FF	FR	TD	PD
2008	KC	16	16	46	32	14	1.0	1	0	0	1
2009	KC	15	14	54	41	13	1.0	0	3	0	2
2010	KC	16	16	69	51	18	2.0	0	1	0	0
2011	KC	15	15	62	31	31	0.0	0	0	0	0
2012	KC	4	4	7	4	3	0.0	0	0	0	0
2013	SF	16	13	41	28	13	2.0	0	0	0	0
2014	SF	0	0	Did not play due to injury							
2015	SF	10	7	18	16	2	0.0	0	0	0	0
2016	SF	12	7	24	20	4	1.0	0	0	0	0
Career		104	92	321	223	98	7.0	1	4	0	3

=== College ===
Season	Team	Games		Tackles					Interceptions			Fumbles			
Season	Team	GP	GS	Cmb	Solo	Ast	TfL	Sck	PD	Int	TD	FF	FR	QBH	Blk
2004	LSU	11	3	18	6	12	2	2.0	1	0	0	1	0	0	0
2005	LSU	13	1	28	16	10	4	3.0	0	0	0	0	0	2	0
2006	LSU	13	13	64	22	42	8.5	3.0	2	0	0	0	1	4	1
2007	LSU	14	13	69	39	30	12.5	7.0	3	0	0	1	0	4	0
Career		51	30	179	83	94	27	15.0	6	0	0	2	1	10	1

== Awards and honors ==
- BCS national champion (2007)
- Lombardi Award (2007)
- Outland Trophy (2007)
- Bronko Nagurski Trophy (2007)
- Lott Trophy (2007)
- SEC Defensive Player of the Year (2007)
- Unanimous All-American (2007)
- First-team All-American (2006)
- 2× First-team All-SEC (2006, 2007)
- College Football Hall of Fame (2020)

== Activism ==
Dorsey filmed a campaign for the proper treatment of dogs in association with PETA.
