= Eric Young (American football) =

American football player (born 1983)

No. 72
- Position: Guard

Personal information
- Born: November 22, 1983 (age 42); Union, South Carolina, U.S.
- Listed height: 6 ft 3 in (1.91 m)
- Listed weight: 304 lb (138 kg)

Career information
- College: Tennessee
- NFL draft: 2008: undrafted

Career history
- Cleveland Browns (2008); St. Louis Rams (2009–2010); San Diego Chargers (2010–2011)*
- * Offseason or practice squad member only

Awards and highlights
- Second-team All-SEC (2007)
- Stats at Pro Football Reference

Eric Darrell Young (born November 22, 1983) is an American former professional football guard. He was signed by the Cleveland Browns as an undrafted free agent in 2008. He played college football at the University of Tennessee.

Young was also a member of the St. Louis Rams and San Diego Chargers.

== Early life ==
At Union High School, Union SC, Young was All-America by Parade, SuperPrep, CNNSI.com/TheInsiders.com and named First-team on CNNSI.com/BorderWars.com All-South Team . Also he was named First-team offense member of Fox Sports Net All-South Team. Young was a Two-time All-State selection and had 33 pancake blocks as senior and 183 during career. He ran 4.8 40-yard dash and as a junior, he won state high school shot put competition with toss of 54–6.

== College career ==
In his last two seasons as a starter, Young produced 148 knockdown blocks and he was the 2007 All-American Dream Team selection rated the second-best offensive guard prospect in the country by The NFL Draft Report He started the team's first eight games at left offensive tackle, earning second-team All-Southeastern Conference honors, despite sitting out the final six contests after suffering a torn quadriceps muscle in his left leg. In 495 offensive snaps, Young registered 58 knockdowns with 11 touchdown-resulting blocks and seven more blocks downfield, leading SEC offensive linemen with an 86.38% grade for blocking consistency. He led an offensive line that allowed only four quarterback sacks for the season. Young has enjoyed a strong senior season at left tackle, and some believe he can remain there in the NFL. At his best as a run blocker, Young uses his hands and quick feet to generate movement at the point of attack. Played both left and right tackle for the Vols, but missed the last six games in '07 because of a torn quad muscle. In 2005, he played nine games with two starts. In 2004, he played in three games including Cotton Bowl Classic vs. Texas A&M. In 2003, he redshirted.

== Professional career ==
Pre-draft measurables
Height	Weight	40-yard dash
6 ft 4 in (1.93 m)	310 lb (141 kg)	5.18 s
All values from NFL Combine.

=== Cleveland Browns ===
Young was signed by the Cleveland Browns as an undrafted rookie free agent on May 1, 2008. He was released for after the 2008 season by the Browns.

=== St. Louis Rams ===
Young signed with the St. Louis Rams on May 20, 2009. After one game he was released on September 16. He was later signed to the Rams practice squad. On December 16, Young was promoted to the active roster.

=== San Diego Chargers ===
Young was signed to a future contract by the San Diego Chargers on January 12, 2011.
