= Ali Highsmith =

American football player (born 1985)

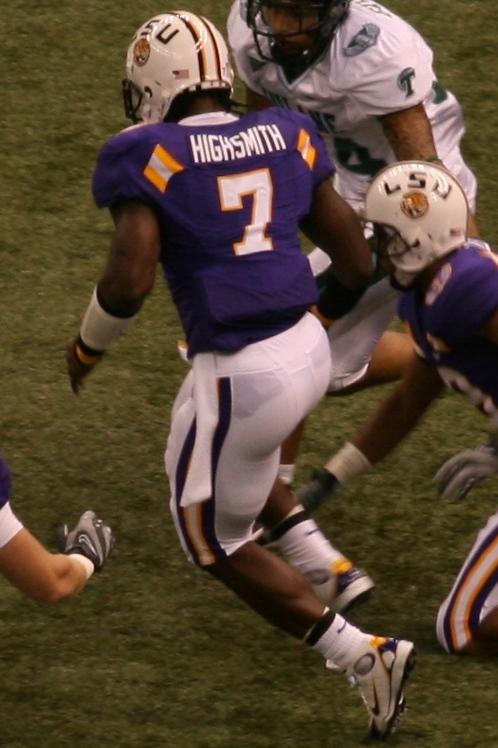
- Highsmith with the LSU Tigers in 2007

No. 95
- Position: Linebacker

Personal information
- Born: January 20, 1985 (age 41); Miami, Florida, U.S.
- Listed height: 6 ft 1 in (1.85 m)
- Listed weight: 230 lb (104 kg)

Career information
- High school: Miami Central (West Little River, Florida)
- College: LSU (2004-2007)
- NFL draft: 2008: undrafted

Career history
- Arizona Cardinals (2008–2009); San Diego Chargers (2010)*
- * Offseason or practice squad member only

Awards and highlights
- AFC Champion (2008); BCS national champion (2007); First-team All-American (2007); First-team All-SEC (2007); Second-team All-SEC (2006)

Career NFL statistics
- Tackles: 17
- Sacks: 0
- Forced fumbles: 0
- Stats at Pro Football Reference

Arlington Louis "Ali" Highsmith (born January 20, 1985) is an American former professional football player who was a linebacker for the Arizona Cardinals of the National Football League (NFL). He played college football for the LSU Tigers, earning first-team All-American honors in 2007. He was signed by the Cardinals as an undrafted free agent in 2008.

== Early life ==
Highsmith played high school football at Central High School in Miami, Florida.

== Professional career ==
Pre-draft measurables
Height	Weight	Arm length	Hand span	40-yard dash	10-yard split	20-yard split	20-yard shuttle	Three-cone drill	Vertical jump	Broad jump	Bench press
5 ft 11 5/8 in (1.82 m)	230 lb (104 kg)	32 in (0.81 m)	9 5/8 in (0.24 m)	4.70 s	1.58 s	2.72 s	4.29 s	7.40 s	29.0 in (0.74 m)	9 ft 4 in (2.84 m)	23 reps
All values from NFL Combine/Pro Day

=== Arizona Cardinals ===
Highsmith went undrafted in the 2008 NFL draft and was signed by the Arizona Cardinals shortly following the draft.

In 2008, Highsmith made the team out of training camp and went on to appear in six games for the Cardinals as a rookie before being placed on season-ending injured reserve with a knee injury on November 4. He finished the season with four tackles.

Highsmith was waived by the Cardinals on December 22, 2009, and re-signed to the team's practice squad the following day. He was re-signed to a future contract on January 18, 2010.

He was waived on August 3, 2010.

=== San Diego Chargers ===
Highsmith was claimed off waivers by the San Diego Chargers on August 5, 2010. He was waived on August 13.
