= 2007 All-America college football team =

Official list of the best college football players of 2007

The 2007 All-America college football team is composed of the following All-American Teams: Associated Press, Football Writers Association of America, American Football Coaches Association, Walter Camp Foundation, The Sporting News, Sports Illustrated, Pro Football Weekly, ESPN, CBS Sports, College Football News, Rivals.com, and Scout.com.

The All-America college football team is an honor given annually to the best American college football players at their respective positions. The original usage of the term All-America seems to have been to such a list selected by football pioneer Walter Camp in the 1890s. The NCAA officially recognizes All-Americans selected by the AP, AFCA, FWAA, TSN, and the WCFF to determine Consensus and Unanimous All-Americans.

Twenty-two players were recognized as consensus All-Americans for 2007, eight of them unanimously. Unanimous selections are followed by an asterisk (*)

2007 Consensus All-Americans
Name	Position	Year	University
Tim Tebow	Quarterback	Sophomore	Florida
Darren McFadden*	Running back	Junior	Arkansas
Kevin Smith	Running back	Junior	UCF
Michael Crabtree*	Wide receiver	Freshman	Texas Tech
Jordy Nelson	Wide receiver	Senior	Kansas State
Martin Rucker	Tight end	Senior	Missouri
Jake Long*	Offensive lineman	Senior	Michigan
Ryan Clady	Offensive lineman	Junior	Boise State
Steve Justice	Offensive lineman	Senior	Wake Forest
Duke Robinson	Offensive lineman	Junior	Oklahoma
Jonathan Luigs	Center	Senior	Arkansas
Glenn Dorsey*	Defensive lineman	Senior	LSU
Sedrick Ellis*	Defensive lineman	Senior	USC
Chris Long*	Defensive lineman	Senior	Virginia
George Selvie	Defensive lineman	Sophomore	South Florida
James Laurinaitis*	Linebacker	Junior	Ohio State
Dan Connor	Linebacker	Senior	Penn State
Jordon Dizon	Linebacker	Senior	Colorado
J Leman	Linebacker	Senior	Illinois
Curtis Lofton	Linebacker	Junior	Oklahoma
Aqib Talib*	Defensive back	Junior	Kansas
Antoine Cason	Defensive back	Senior	Arizona
Jamie Silva	Defensive back	Senior	Boston College
Craig Steltz	Defensive back	Senior	LSU
John Sullivan	Placekicker	Senior	New Mexico
Kevin Huber	Punter	Junior	Cincinnati
Felix Jones	Kick returner	Junior	Arkansas
Jeremy Maclin	All-purpose	Sophomore	Missouri

== Offense ==
=== Quarterback ===
- Tim Tebow, Florida (AP-1, FWAA-Writers, Walter Camp, Sporting News, Sports Illustrated, ESPN, CBS Sports, College Football News, Rivals.com, Scout.com)
- Matt Ryan, Boston College (AFCA-Coaches, Pro Football Weekly)
- Chase Daniel, Missouri (AP-2, WCFF-2)
- Colt Brennan, Hawaii (AP-3)

=== Running back ===
- Darren McFadden, Arkansas (AP-1, AFCA-Coaches, FWAA-Writers, Walter Camp, Sporting News, Sports Illustrated, Pro Football Weekly, ESPN, CBS Sports, College Football News, Rivals.com, Scout.com)
- Kevin Smith, Central Florida (AP-1, FWAA-Writers, Walter Camp, Sporting News, Sports Illustrated, ESPN, CBS Sports, College Football News, Scout.com)
- Jonathan Stewart, Oregon (AFCA-Coaches, AP-3)
- Rashard Mendenhall, Illinois (Pro Football Weekly)
- Ray Rice, Rutgers (Rivals.com, AP-2, WCFF-2)
- Mike Hart, Michigan (AP-2, WCFF-2)
- Matt Forte, Tulane (AP-3)

=== Fullback ===
- Brannan Southerland, Georgia (Pro Football Weekly)

=== Wide receiver ===
- Michael Crabtree, Texas Tech (AP-1, AFCA-Coaches, FWAA-Writers, Walter Camp, Sporting News, Sports Illustrated, ESPN, CBS Sports, College Football News, Rivals.com, Scout.com)
- Jordy Nelson, Kansas State (AP-1, AFCA-Coaches, FWAA-Writers, Walter Camp, Sports Illustrated, Pro Football Weekly, ESPN, CBS Sports, College Football News, Rivals.com, Scout.com)
- Percy Harvin, Florida (Sporting News)
- Jeremy Maclin, Missouri (Pro Football Weekly)
- Mario Manningham, Michigan (AP-2, WCFF-2)
- Harry Douglas, Louisville (AP-2)
- James Hardy, Indiana (WCFF-2, AP-3)
- Davone Bess, Hawaii (WCFF-2, AP-3)

=== Tight end ===
- Martin Rucker, Missouri (AP-1, AFCA-Coaches, FWAA-Writers, ESPN, CBS Sports, Scout.com, WCFF-2)
- Travis Beckum, Wisconsin (Walter Camp, Sports Illustrated, College Football News, Rivals.com, AP-3)
- Fred Davis, Southern California (Sporting News, AP-2)
- Brandon Pettigrew, Oklahoma State (Pro Football Weekly)

=== Tackles ===
- Jake Long, Michigan (AP-1, AFCA-Coaches, FWAA-Writers, Walter Camp, Sporting News, Sports Illustrated, Pro Football Weekly, ESPN, CBS Sports, College Football News, Rivals.com, Scout.com)
- Anthony Collins, Kansas (AP-1, FWAA-Writers, Walter Camp, Sports Illustrated, CBS Sports, College Football News, Rivals.com)
- Ryan Clady, Boise State (AFCA-Coaches, Sporting News, Scout.com, AP-2, WCFF-2)
- Kirk Barton, Ohio State (AFCA-Coaches, ESPN, AP-3)
- Sam Baker, Southern California (Walter Camp, AP-2)
- Alex Mack, California (Sporting News)
- Max Unger, Oregon (Sports Illustrated)
- Jeff Otah, Pittsburgh (Pro Football Weekly)
- Barry Richardson, Clemson (College Football News, WCFF-2)

=== Guards ===
- Duke Robinson, Oklahoma (AP-1, AFCA-Coaches, Sporting News, Sports Illustrated, Pro Football Weekly, ESPN, College Football News, Rivals.com, Scout.com, WCFF-2)
- Martin O'Donnell, Illinois (AP-1, Rivals.com, Scout.com)
- Hercules Satele, Hawaii (FWAA-Writers)
- Ryan Stanchek, West Virginia (FWAA-Writers, WCFF-2, AP-3)
- Tony Hills, Texas (Walter Camp)
- Roy Schuening, Oregon State (Pro Football Weekly, ESPN)
- Gosder Cherilus, Boston College (CBS Sports)
- Robert Felton, Arkansas (AP-2)
- Anthony Parker, Tennessee (AP-2)
- Andrew Crummey, Maryland (AP-3)
- Branden Albert, Virginia (AP-3)

=== Center ===
- Jonathan Luigs, Arkansas (FWAA-Writers, Walter Camp, Sporting News, Sports Illustrated, CBS Sports, College Football News, Rivals.com, Scout.com, AP-2)
- Steve Justice, Wake Forest (AP-1, AFCA-Coaches, Pro Football Weekly, ESPN, CBS Sports, WCFF-2)
- Adam Spieker, Missouri (AP-3)

== Defense ==
=== Ends ===
- Chris Long, Virginia (AP-1, AFCA-Coaches, FWAA-Writers, Walter Camp, Sporting News, Sports Illustrated, Pro Football Weekly, ESPN, CBS Sports, Rivals.com, Scout.com)
- George Selvie, South Florida (AP-1, AFCA-Coaches, FWAA-Writers, Walter Camp, Sports Illustrated, ESPN, CBS Sports, College Football News, Rivals.com, Scout.com)
- Greg Middleton, Indiana (Sporting News, CBS Sports, College Football News, WCFF-2, AP-3)
- Vernon Gholston, Ohio State (Pro Football Weekly, AP-2, WCFF-2)
- Bruce Davis, UCLA (WCFF-2)
- Lawrence Jackson, USC (AP-2)
- Greg Hardy, Mississippi (WCFF-2)
- Jonal Saint-Dic, Michigan State (WCFF-2)
- Nick Reed, Oregon (AP-3)

=== Tackles ===
- Glenn Dorsey, LSU (AP-1, AFCA-Coaches, FWAA-Writers, Walter Camp, Sporting News, Sports Illustrated, Pro Football Weekly, College Football News, Rivals.com, Scout.com)
- Sedrick Ellis, Southern California (AP-1, AFCA-Coaches FWAA-Writers, Walter Camp, Sporting News, Sports Illustrated, Pro Football Weekly, ESPN, College Football News, Rivals.com, Scout.com)
- Terrill Byrd, Cincinnati (AP-2)
- James McClinton, Kansas (AP-2)
- Vance Walker, Georgia Tech (AP-3)
- Frank Okam, Texas (AP-3)

=== Linebackers ===
- James Laurinaitis, Ohio State (AP-1, AFCA-Coaches, FWAA-Writers, Walter Camp, Sporting News, Sports Illustrated, Pro Football Weekly, ESPN, CBS Sports, Rivals.com, Scout.com)
- Dan Connor, Penn State (AP-1, Walter Camp, ESPN, College Football News, Rivals.com, Scout.com)
- Jordon Dizon, Colorado (AP-1, Walter Camp, Sporting News, ESPN, College Football News, Rivals.com)
- J Leman, Illinois (AFCA-Coaches, FWAA-Writers, ESPN, CBS Sports, AP-2, WCFF-2)
- Curtis Lofton, Oklahoma (FWAA-Writers, Sporting News, Sports Illustrated, College Football News, AP-2)
- Xavier Adibi, Virginia Tech (AFCA-Coaches, AP-3)
- Keith Rivers, Southern California (Sports Illustrated, Pro Football Weekly, WCFF-2)
- Scott McKillop, Pittsburgh (Scout.com, AP-3)
- Sean Lee, Penn State (Pro Football Weekly)
- Ali Highsmith, LSU (CBS Sports, AP-2)
- Shawn Crable, Michigan (WCFF-2)
- Ben Moffitt, South Florida (AP-3)

=== Cornerback ===
- Aqib Talib, Kansas (AP-1, AFCA-Coaches, FWAA-Writers, Walter Camp, Sporting News, Sports Illustrated, ESPN, CBS Sports, College Football News, Rivals.com)
- Antoine Cason, Arizona (AP-1, Walter Camp, Sporting News, Sports Illustrated, ESPN, CBS Sports, College Football News, Rivals.com, Scout.com)
- Dwight Lowery, San Jose State (AFCA-Coaches)
- Brandon Flowers, Virginia Tech (AFCA-Coaches, AP-2, WCFF-2)
- Mike Mickens, Cincinnati (FWAA-Writers)
- Alphonso Smith, Wake Forest (Scout.com, WCFF-2, AP-3)
- Leodis McKelvin, Troy (Pro Football Weekly)
- Trey Brown, UCLA (WCFF-2)
- Malcolm Jenkins, Ohio State (Pro Football Weekly, AP-2, WCFF-2)

=== Safety ===
- Craig Steltz, LSU (AP-1, FWAA-Writers, Walter Camp, Sports Illustrated, ESPN, CBS Sports, College Football News, Rivals.com, Scout.com)
- Jamie Silva, Boston College (AP-1, FWAA-Writers, Walter Camp, Sports Illustrated, CBS Sports, College Football News, Scout.com)
- Mike Jenkins, South Florida (AFCA-Coaches, AP-3)
- Taylor Mays, Southern California (Sporting News, AP-3)
- Chris Horton, UCLA (Sporting News)
- William Moore, Missouri (Pro Football Weekly, Rivals.com, AP-2)
- Nic Harris, Oklahoma (Pro Football Weekly)
- Marcus Griffin, Texas (ESPN)
- Patrick Chung, Oregon (AP-2)
- Kenny Phillips, Miami (AP-3)

== Special teams ==
=== Kicker ===
- John Sullivan, New Mexico (Walter Camp, Sporting News, ESPN, AP-3)
- Thomas Weber, Arizona State (AP-1, CBS Sports, College Football News, Scout.com, WCFF-2)
- Taylor Mehlhaff, Wisconsin (AFCA-Coaches)
- Daniel Lincoln, Tennessee (FWAA-Writers)
- Austin Starr, Indiana (Sports Illustrated, AP-2)
- Steven Hauschka, North Carolina State (Pro Football Weekly)
- Louie Sakoda, Utah (Rivals.com)

=== Punter ===
- Kevin Huber, Cincinnati (AP-1, Walter Camp, Sporting News, Scout.com)
- Chris Miller, Ball State (AFCA-Coaches)
- Louie Sakoda, Utah (FWAA-Writers, CBS Sports)
- Durant Brooks, Georgia Tech (Sports Illustrated, Pro Football Weekly, ESPN, College Football News, Rivals.com, AP-2, WCFF-2)
- Brett Kern, Toledo (AP-3)

=== All-purpose player / return specialist ===
- Jeremy Maclin, Missouri (AP-1, FWAA-Writers, Sporting News-KR, Sports Illustrated-PR, ESPN-KR, CBS Sports-KR, Rivals.com, Scout.com)
- Felix Jones, Arkansas (Walter Camp-Returner, Rivals.com-KR, Scout.com-PR, AP-2)
- DeSean Jackson, California (AFCA-Coaches, AP-3)
- Leodis McKelvin, Troy (Sporting News-PR, Rivals.com-PR, Pro Football Weekly-PR, Scout.com-KR)
- Matthew Slater, UCLA (Sports Illustrated-KR)
- Chris Johnson, East Carolina (Pro Football Weekly)
- Kevin Robinson, Utah State (CBS Sports, College Football News-PR, WCFF-2)
- A. J. Jefferson, Fresno State (College Football News)

== See also ==
- 2007 All-Atlantic Coast Conference football team
- 2007 All-Big 12 Conference football team
- 2007 All-Big Ten Conference football team
- 2007 All-Pacific-10 Conference football team
- 2007 All-SEC football team
