= Ricky Jean Francois =

American football player (born 1986)

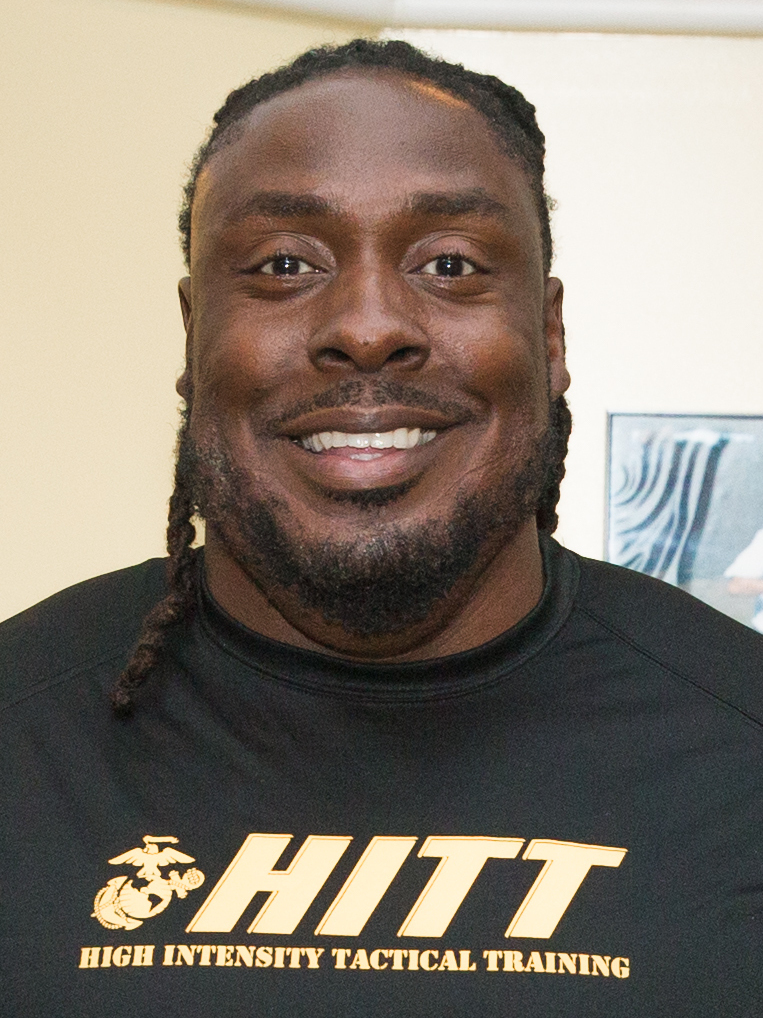
- Jean Francois in 2018

No. 95, 99, 94, 97
- Position: Defensive tackle

Personal information
- Born: November 23, 1986 (age 39); Miami, Florida, U.S.
- Listed height: 6 ft 2 in (1.88 m)
- Listed weight: 309 lb (140 kg)

Career information
- High school: Miami Carol City
- College: LSU
- NFL draft: 2009: 7th round, 244th overall pick

Career history
- San Francisco 49ers (2009–2012); Indianapolis Colts (2013–2014); Washington Redskins (2015–2016); Green Bay Packers (2017); New England Patriots (2017); Detroit Lions (2018)

Awards and highlights
- BCS national champion (2007); BCS Defensive MVP (2007)

Career NFL statistics
- Total tackles: 195
- Sacks: 14
- Forced fumbles: 1
- Fumble recoveries: 1
- Stats at Pro Football Reference

Ricky Barkley Jean Francois (born November 23, 1986) is an American former professional football player who was a defensive tackle in the National Football League (NFL). He played college football for the LSU Tigers and was selected by the San Francisco 49ers in the seventh round of the 2009 NFL draft. Jean Francois also played for the Indianapolis Colts, Washington Redskins, Green Bay Packers, New England Patriots, and Detroit Lions.

== College career ==
As a member of the national championship–winning 2007 LSU Tigers football team, he was the defensive MVP of the 2008 BCS National Championship Game. Jean Francois was also a member of the LSU track & field team.

== Professional career ==
=== San Francisco 49ers ===
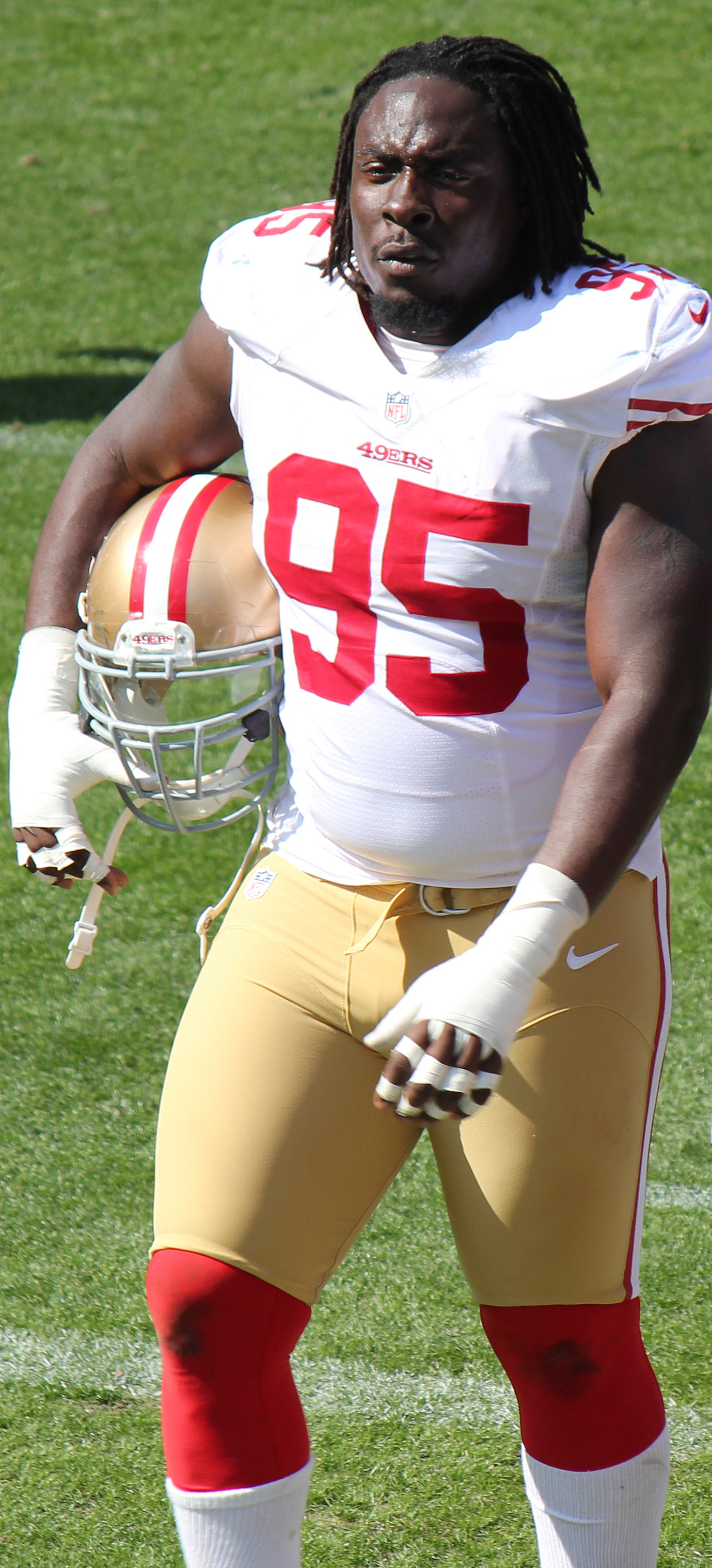
Jean Francois in 2012

Jean Francois was selected by the San Francisco 49ers in the seventh round, 244th overall, in the 2009 NFL draft. He became famous among 49ers fans for his "Peanut Butter Jelly Dance".

In 2012, Jean Francois and the 49ers appeared in Super Bowl XLVII. In the game, he had two combined tackles as the 49ers fell to the Baltimore Ravens by a score of 34–31.

=== Indianapolis Colts ===
Jean Francois signed with the Colts on March 14, 2013. He was released on February 23, 2015.

=== Washington Redskins ===
Jean Francois signed a three-year, $9 million contract with the Washington Redskins on February 26, 2015.

On March 15, 2017, Jean Francois was released by the Redskins.

=== Green Bay Packers ===
On March 24, 2017, Jean Francois signed a one-year, $3 million contract with the Green Bay Packers. He was released on September 12. Jean Francois re-signed with the team nine days later. On November 1, he was released again by the Packers.

=== New England Patriots ===
On November 7, 2017, Jean Francois signed with the New England Patriots. He was released on December 2. Jean Francois was re-signed on December 13.

=== Detroit Lions ===
On July 25, 2018, Jean Francois signed a one-year deal with the Detroit Lions.

== NFL career statistics ==
Legend
**Bold**	Career high

=== Regular season ===
Year	Team	Games		Tackles					Interceptions					Fumbles			
Year	Team	GP	GS	Cmb	Solo	Ast	Sck	TFL	Int	Yds	TD	Lng	PD	FF	FR	Yds	TD
2009	SF	3	0	0	0	0	0.0	0	0	0	0	0	0	0	0	0	0
2010	SF	**16**	0	12	9	3	1.0	0	0	0	0	0	1	**1**	0	0	0
2011	SF	**16**	2	15	12	3	0.0	0	0	0	0	0	2	0	0	0	0
2012	SF	**16**	3	22	12	10	2.0	4	0	0	0	0	0	0	0	0	0
2013	IND	10	10	19	13	6	2.5	5	0	0	0	0	2	0	0	0	0
2014	IND	**16**	**13**	28	18	10	**3.0**	**7**	0	0	0	0	**4**	0	**1**	0	0
2015	WAS	**16**	1	25	9	**16**	2.0	5	0	0	0	0	1	0	0	0	0
2016	WAS	**16**	6	**32**	17	15	1.5	3	0	0	0	0	1	0	0	0	0
2017	GB	6	0	2	1	1	0.0	0	0	0	0	0	0	0	0	0	0
2017	NE	6	1	10	6	4	0.0	2	0	0	0	0	0	0	0	0	0
2018	DET	**16**	11	30	**19**	11	2.0	3	0	0	0	0	0	0	0	0	0
		137	47	195	116	79	14.0	29	0	0	0	0	11	1	1	0	0

=== Playoffs ===
Year	Team	Games		Tackles					Interceptions					Fumbles			
Year	Team	GP	GS	Cmb	Solo	Ast	Sck	TFL	Int	Yds	TD	Lng	PD	FF	FR	Yds	TD
2011	SFO	2	0	0	0	0	0.0	0	0	0	0	0	**1**	0	0	0	0
2012	SFO	**3**	0	2	1	1	0.0	0	0	0	0	0	0	0	0	0	0
2013	IND	2	**2**	5	3	2	**1.0**	**2**	0	0	0	0	0	0	0	0	0
2014	IND	**3**	0	**6**	0	**6**	0.5	0	0	0	0	0	0	0	0	0	0
2015	WAS	1	0	1	1	0	0.0	0	0	0	0	0	0	0	0	0	0
2017	NE	**3**	1	**6**	**4**	2	**1.0**	1	0	0	0	0	0	0	0	0	0
		14	3	20	9	11	2.5	3	0	0	0	0	1	0	0	0	0

== Personal life ==
Jean Francois has a brother named Michael. He is of Haitian descent.
