= Oak Grove High School (Pulaski County, Arkansas) =

Location
- 10025 Oakland Drive; North Little Rock, Arkansas; United States; 34°50′45″N 92°19′4″W

Information
- Type: Public
- Established: 1967
- Status: Closed
- Closed: 2011
- School district: Pulaski County Special School District
- Principal: Joy Plants
- Grades: 7-12
- Enrollment: 414 (2008-09)
- Colors: Green and Yellow
- Nickname: Hornets
- Yearbook: The Hornet
- Website: web.archive.org/*/http://www.pcssd.org:80/oakgrove/

Oak Grove High School was a public secondary school located in unincorporated Pulaski County, Arkansas, near North Little Rock. Oak Grove High School served grades 7 through 12 and was administered by the Pulaski County Special School District. Since 1967, Oak Grove had been accredited by the North Central Association (NCA) Commission on Accreditation and School Improvement (CASI). Oak Grove's official colors were green and white, and the school's mascot was a hornet.

The 2010-2011 school year was the last for Oak Grove to operate. The school mascot was transferred to the new Maumelle High School, built a few miles away in Maumelle, AR. The name "Oak Grove" and the school's colors did not transfer. The 2011-2012 school year was the first year in which Maumelle had its own high school.

Since its closure, the campus has been frequently vandalized and broken into. Several incidents of thieves ripping out copper wiring from various A/C units and breaking into the shop building to steal copper wiring within have been reported. The incidents have forced school administrators to remove all of the A/C units.

In early 2013, ThatChurch.com purchased the school building and immediately began the transformation into The Oak Grove Life Center. A new 501C3 nonprofit organization was formed, and the Oak Grove High School took on its new identity as The Oak Grove Life Center.

== Athletics ==
The Oak Grove Hornets competed in several interscholastic athletic activities, including soccer, football, baseball, softball, basketball (boys and girls), track & field, wrestling, volleyball (girls), golf, and cheerleading. The Hornets last competed in the 7-4A conference with Pulaski Robinson, Pulaski Academy, DeQueen, Malvern, Nashville, Bauxite, and Ashdown High Schools.

== Notable alumni ==
- Darren McFadden (2005), two-time All-American running back; Doak Walker Award (2006, 2007)
