= Steve Justice =

American football player (born 1984)

No. 53, 71, 74
- Position: Center

Personal information
- Born: May 26, 1984 (age 42); Lancaster, Pennsylvania, U.S.
- Listed height: 6 ft 4 in (1.93 m)
- Listed weight: 284 lb (129 kg)

Career information
- High school: New Smyrna Beach (New Smyrna Beach, Florida)
- College: Wake Forest
- NFL draft: 2008: 6th round, 201st overall pick

Career history
- Indianapolis Colts (2008); New York Sentinels (2009); Carolina Panthers (2010)*; Florida Tuskers (2010); Virginia Destroyers (2011)
- * Offseason or practice squad member only

Awards and highlights
- Consensus All-American (2007); 2× First-team All-ACC (2006, 2007)

Career NFL statistics
- Games played: 8
- Games started: 1
- Stats at Pro Football Reference

Steven Justice (born May 26, 1984) is an American former professional football player who was a center in the National Football League (NFL) and United Football League (UFL). He played college football for the Wake Forest Demon Deacons, earning consensus All-American honors in 2007. He was selected by the Indianapolis Colts in the sixth round of the 2008 NFL draft, and has played for the NFL's Colts, and the UFL's New York Sentinels, Florida Tuskers, and Virginia Destroyers.

== Early life ==
Justice was born in Lancaster, Pennsylvania. He played high school football at New Smyrna Beach High School in New Smyrna Beach, Florida.

== College career ==
Justice attended Wake Forest University in Winston-Salem, North Carolina, and played for coach Jim Grobe's Wake Forest Demon Deacons football team from 2003 to 2007. He redshirted as a true freshman in 2003. Along with Steve Vallos, he anchored a standout offensive line as Wake Forest won the 2006 ACC Championship and reached the Orange Bowl. Justice was a first-team All-Atlantic Coast Conference (ACC) selection in 2006 and 2007. As a senior in 2007, he was recognized as a consensus first-team All-American.

== Professional career ==
The Indianapolis Colts selected Justice in the sixth round (201st pick overall) in the 2008 NFL Draft, and he played for the Colts for a single season in 2008. He subsequently played in the UFL for the New York Sentinels in 2009, and the Florida Tuskers in 2010 and 2011.
