= Stephen Babcock (lawyer) =

American lawyer

- Babcock in 2023
- Born: Timothy Stephen Babcock; West Monroe, Louisiana, U.S.
- Education: B.S., Louisiana Tech University, JD, Paul M. Hebert Law Center
- Occupation: Lawyer

Stephen Babcock is a Baton Rouge, Louisiana-based trial lawyer.

== Early life and education ==
Stephen Babcock was born in West Monroe, Louisiana. He attended Cedar Creek School in Ruston, Louisiana from kindergarten to seventh grade and graduated from Ruston High School in 1991. Babcock attended Louisiana Tech University where he earned a Bachelor of Science (BS) degree in marketing, and a Juris Doctor (JD) from the Paul M. Hebert Law Center.

== Early career ==
Babcock's first job as a lawyer was as an in-house trial attorney for Allstate after he passed the Louisiana bar exam in 2000. He opened his own firm, Babcock Law Firm, LLC (now Babcock Injury Lawyers) in March 2003.

== Legal practice ==
In July 2013, Babcock Partners was hired by Ducks Unlimited to represent the organization in a million dollar federal lawsuit stemming from a contract dispute over a New Orleans artist's prints. Babcock filed four Motions for summary judgment in the United States District Court for the Eastern District of Louisiana on behalf of Ducks Unlimited. Three of the four motions were granted. The case resulted in a voluntary dismissal.
