= Darren McFadden =

American football player (born 1987)

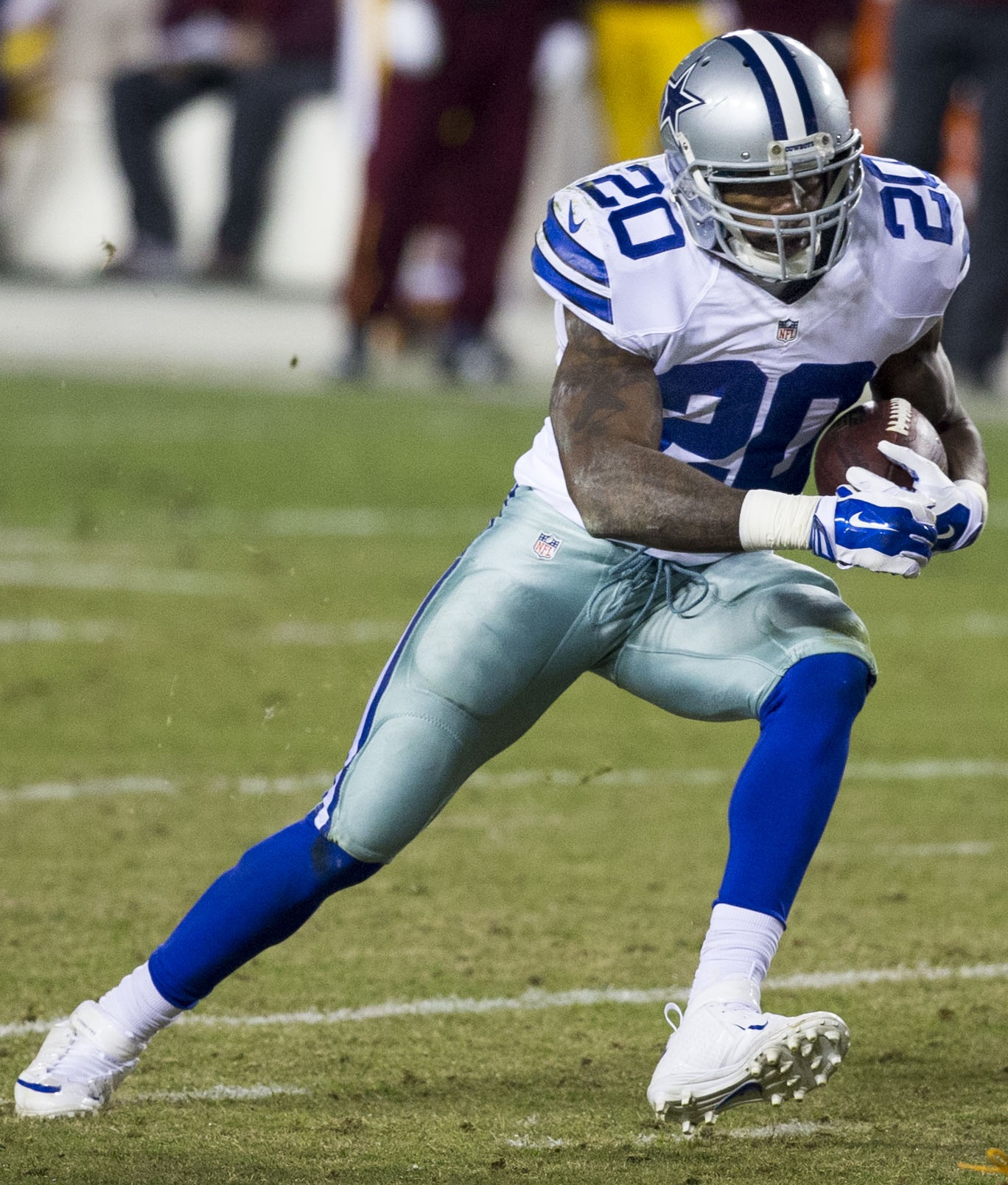
- McFadden with the Dallas Cowboys in 2015

No. 20
- Position: Running back

Personal information
- Born: August 27, 1987 (age 39); Little Rock, Arkansas, U.S.
- Listed height: 6 ft 1 in (1.85 m)
- Listed weight: 222 lb (101 kg)

Career information
- High school: Oak Grove (North Little Rock, Arkansas)
- College: Arkansas (2005–2007)
- NFL draft: 2008: 1st round, 4th overall pick

Career history
- Oakland Raiders (2008–2014); Dallas Cowboys (2015–2017)

Awards and highlights
- Walter Camp Award (2007); 2× Doak Walker Award (2006, 2007); 2× Jim Brown Trophy (2006, 2007); Unanimous All-American (2007); Consensus All-American (2006); 2× SEC Offensive Player of the Year (2006, 2007); 3× First-team All-SEC (2005–2007); SEC Freshman of the Year (2005)

Career NFL statistics
- Rushing yards: 5,421
- Rushing average: 4.2
- Rushing touchdowns: 28
- Receptions: 254
- Receiving yards: 2,114
- Receiving touchdowns: 5
- Stats at Pro Football Reference
- College Football Hall of Fame

Darren Gralon McFadden (born August 27, 1987) is an American former professional football player who was a running back in the National Football League (NFL) for 10 seasons. He played college football for the Arkansas Razorbacks and was selected by the Oakland Raiders in the first round with the fourth overall pick of the 2008 NFL draft. McFadden also played three seasons for the Dallas Cowboys.

At Arkansas, McFadden had a decorated career, twice finishing as a finalist for the Heisman Trophy and as a consensus member of the All-American team. He was highly touted coming out of school, and was picked fourth overall by the Raiders. McFadden struggled with consistency through his professional career, only rushing for over 1,000 yards twice and never started all 16 games of a season. McFadden retired midway through the 2017 NFL season, and was voted into the College Football Hall of Fame in 2019.

== Early life ==
McFadden was born in Little Rock, Arkansas on August 27, 1987, to Grayton McFadden and Mini Muhammad. The tenth of 12 children, he encountered hardships in his early life with some members of his family, including his mother, having addictions to drugs.

McFadden attended Oak Grove High School in North Little Rock, where he was a three-sport star in football, baseball, and track. McFadden played a variety of positions for his football team, but was primarily used as a running back on offense, and a safety on defense. In track & field, he competed as a sprinter and was timed at 10.8 seconds in the 100-meter dash. As a senior, McFadden was a Parade magazine high school All-American in 2004, as well as the Arkansas High School player of the year for the Arkansas Democrat-Gazette. Following his senior year, McFadden was awarded the prestigious Landers Award, given every year to the top player in the state of Arkansas. He was ranked the number 23 player in the nation by Rivals.com and the number three athlete, and was given a five star rating, the highest star rating. McFadden was a highly recruited prospect, and while he garnered interest from many schools around the Deep South including Tennessee, Alabama, and Auburn, McFadden chose to end the recruiting process early and attend the University of Arkansas.

== College career ==
McFadden received an athletic scholarship to attend the University of Arkansas, where he was a standout running back for coach Houston Nutt's Arkansas Razorbacks football team from 2005 to 2007.

=== 2005 season ===
McFadden made his Arkansas debut on September 3, recording nine carries for 70 yards and a touchdown in a victory over Missouri State in the team's first game. On October 8, McFadden had 11 carries for 125 yards and two touchdowns in a win over Louisiana-Monroe. In the next game against Auburn, he rushed 13 times for 108 yards and two touchdowns. McFadden had 31 carries for 190 yards and two touchdowns on the road against Georgia. He followed the Georgia game with a 32-carry, 187-yard effort against South Carolina. Two weeks later against Mississippi State, McFadden had 21 carries for 165 yards and two touchdowns in the victory. He completed his first pass in a Razorback uniform in the game against LSU, when he completed a pass to Marcus Monk for 13 yards. McFadden was an integral part of an Arkansas offense that ended up going 4–7 with close losses to Georgia and LSU. In 2005, his true freshman season, McFadden rushed 176 times for 1,113 yards and 11 touchdowns.

McFadden ended the season with the most yards a freshman running back had ever gained in an Arkansas uniform, and became only the seventh Southeastern Conference player to rush over 1,000 yards as a freshman. He was recognized at the end of the season as Southeastern Conference (SEC) Freshman of the Year honors by both the SEC Media as well as SEC coaches. McFadden also garnered Freshman All-American nods, and was named as Newcomer of the Year for the Southeastern Conference by ESPN. He continued through spring practice early the next year as the number one running back on the Razorback depth chart, a spot he never relinquished while on campus.

=== 2006 season ===
In 2006, despite a slow start to the season due to a dislocated toe from an off the field incident at a night club in Little Rock, McFadden rushed for a school-record 1,647 yards, the fifth best all-time in the SEC for single season yards, scored 14 touchdowns, and threw for three more touchdowns on just nine passing attempts, becoming a first-team All-American. He had four games on the season going over 180 rushing yards and four games with multiple rushing touchdowns. McFadden attained a new career high for yards in a single game in his 219-yard performance in a 26–20 win against South Carolina. Thanks to his efforts, Arkansas streaked to ten wins and the SEC Western Division Championship, but lost to Wisconsin in the Capital One Bowl on January 1, 2007, and finished with a 10–4 record.

On December 6, 2006, McFadden was named one of three finalists for the Heisman Trophy, along with Troy Smith from Ohio State and Brady Quinn from Notre Dame. In the final 2006 Heisman vote, McFadden placed second with 878 points, 1,662 points behind Smith (2,540 points) and ahead of Quinn (782 points), in what is considered by many pundits to be one of the biggest Heisman snubs in history. On December 7, McFadden became the first sophomore to win the Doak Walker Award, given annually to the nation's top running back. He was also the winner of Jim Brown Trophy in 2006. McFadden was a consensus All-America choice, making the vast majority of teams selected. He won SEC Offensive Player of the Year.

McFadden surpassed Madre Hill as the record holder for most rushing yards in a season at the University of Arkansas in 2006. He was also the centerpiece of the "Wildhog formation," an offensive formation wherein McFadden usually lined up at quarterback position. McFadden often played quarterback in high school, and in the Wildcat formation, he was a threat to throw the ball, to run the ball, or to hand off to another player.

=== 2007 season ===
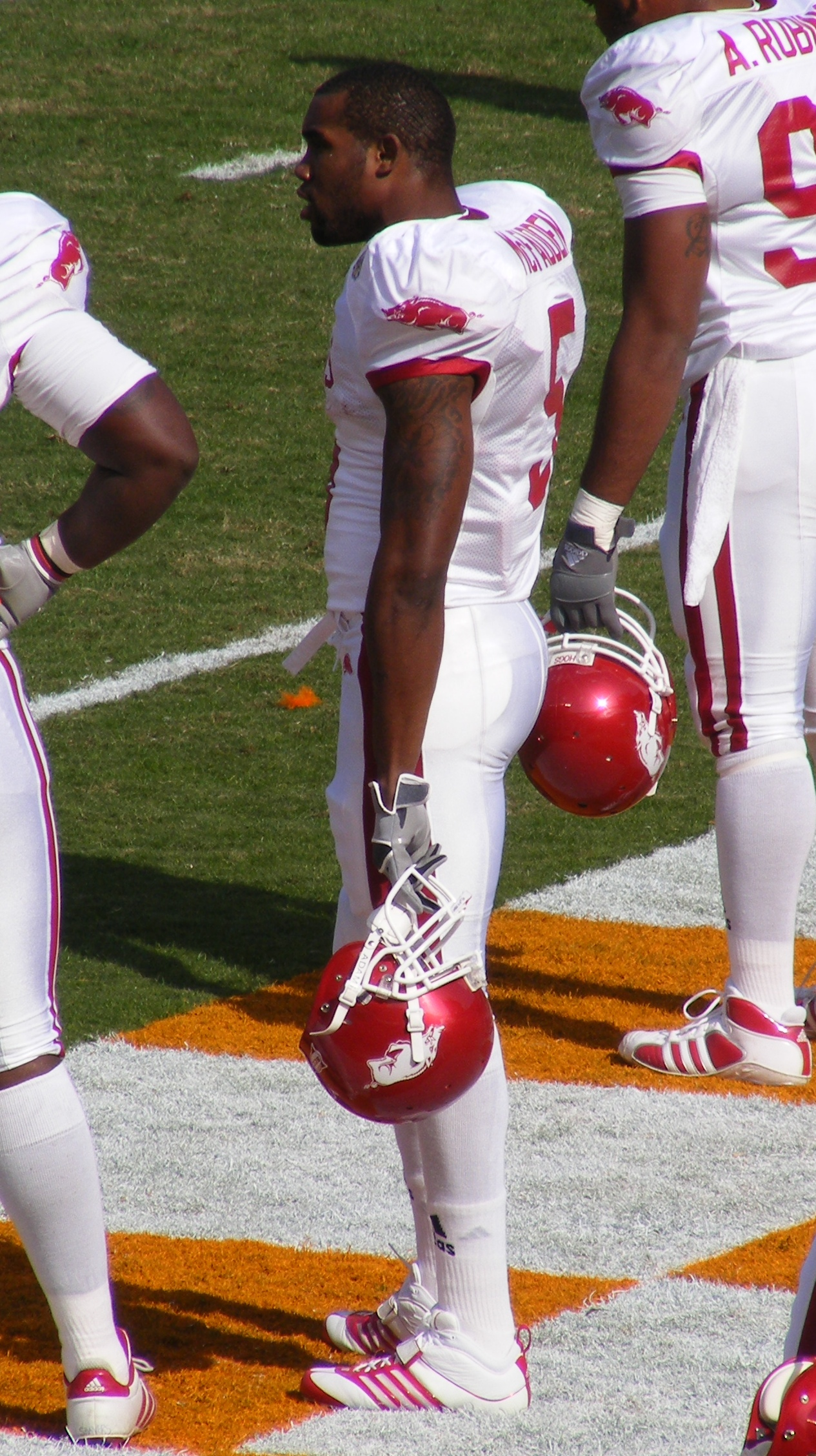
McFadden in 2007 during a game between Arkansas and Tennessee at Neyland Stadium

Before the 2007 season, McFadden was believed to be one of the top NFL draft picks after the season if he declared for the 2008 NFL draft. On Sports Illustrated's website, a photo gallery chronicling the best possible candidates in the 2008 draft he was tipped as the number one pick. McFadden was also predicted to be a front-runner for many awards, including the Doak Walker, the Maxwell, and the Walter Camp Player of the Year.

McFadden began the 2007 season with five consecutive games in which he gained at least 120 yards. Highlighting these were a 195-yard effort against Alabama, a 151-yard game against Troy, and a 173-yard effort against Kentucky. After this stretch of games, McFadden looked to be a lock for the Heisman Trophy, at the top of generally every watch list. On November 3, 2007, he tied the Southeastern Conference single-game rushing record held by former Vanderbilt Commodores running back Frank Mordica's 1978 game total versus the Air Force Falcons with 321 yards rushing against South Carolina. On November 23, McFadden led Arkansas to a 50–48 triple overtime victory over the #1-ranked LSU Tigers in Baton Rouge, Louisiana, winning the Battle for the Golden Boot for Arkansas. He rushed 32 times for 206 yards and three touchdowns, and completed three of six passes for 34 yards and a touchdown. After Arkansas lost 38–7 to Missouri in the January 1, 2008 Cotton Bowl Classic in Dallas, Texas, McFadden decided to forgo his senior season and declare for the 2008 NFL draft.

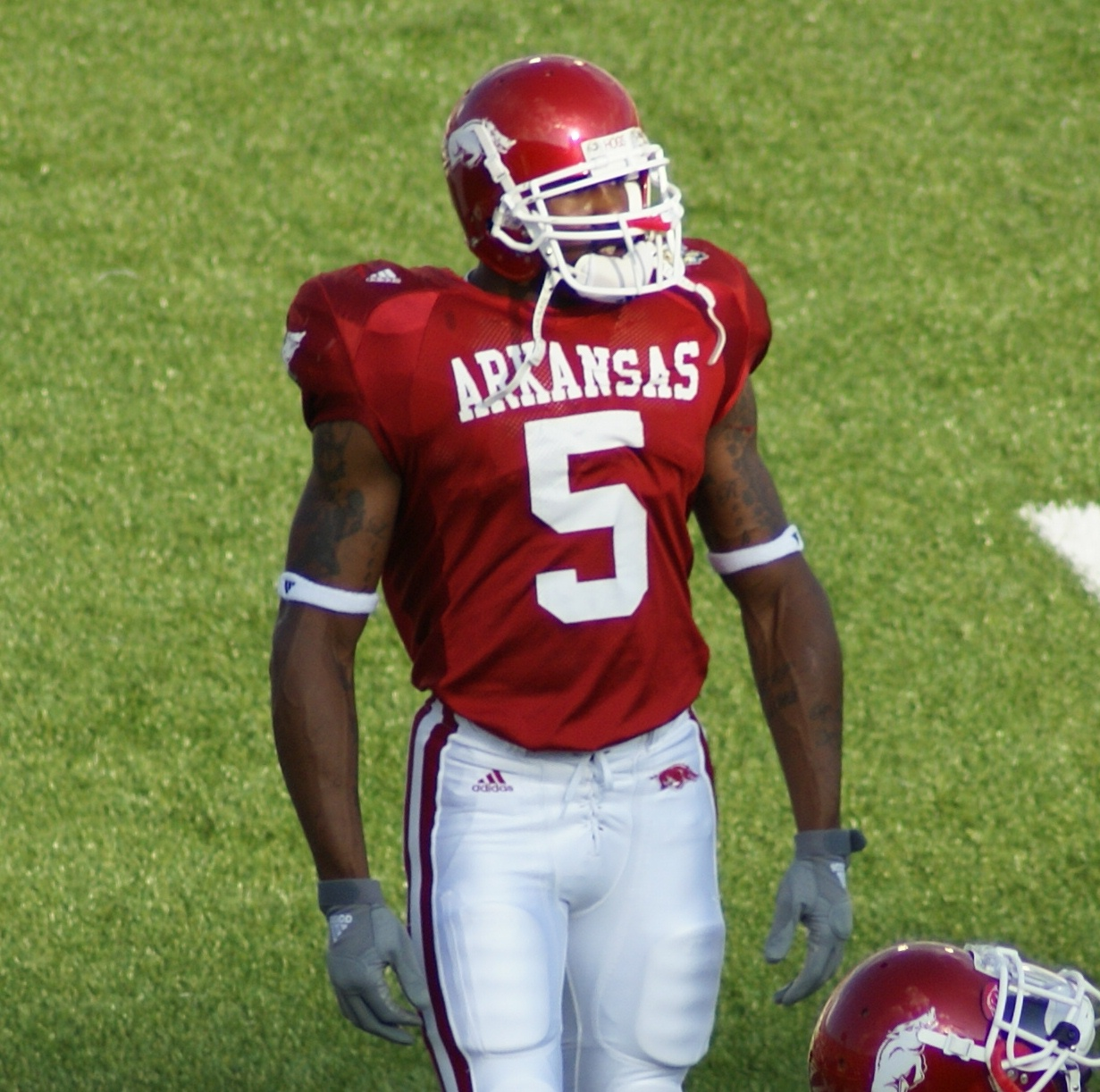
McFadden in 2007

By any measure, McFadden's 2007 season was a success: he was selected as the Sporting News magazine National Player of the Year, was a consensus First-team All-American for the second straight season, won the Doak Walker Award for the second year in a row, was selected as the Southeastern Conference Offensive Player of the Year by SEC coaches, and he was also awarded the Walter Camp Award, given to the nation's best overall player voted on by the Walter Camp Foundation. McFadden finished his junior season with 325 carries for 1,829 yards and 16 touchdowns. He also threw four touchdowns, and garnered another touchdown receiving. On December 6, 2007, McFadden was announced as the winner of the Walter Camp Award and as the winner of the Doak Walker Award. He became only the second person (along with Ricky Williams) in history to win the Doak Walker Award twice. McFadden finished as the runner-up for the 2007 Heisman Trophy for the second year in a row. He was runner-up to Tim Tebow of the Florida Gators by a margin of 1,957 points to 1,703 points, making him the first person since 1949 to finish second in Heisman voting in consecutive years. Again, McFadden was the winner of the Jim Brown Trophy, given to the nation's top running back. He was also recognized as a unanimous first-team All-American.

McFadden ended his college career as the most decorated player in school history, and holds virtually all of the university's rushing records, and is also in a number of the SEC's all-time top 10 rushing spots. His career total of 4,590 yards ranks third all-time in career rushing yards in the SEC, behind only Herschel Walker and Nick Chubb of Georgia. McFadden finished his career in seventh place for the Southeastern Conference career rushing touchdowns record with 41. McFadden is generally considered to be the best and finest football player in Arkansas Razorbacks football history, and is certainly the most decorated.

In late December 2007, sports agent and former Arkansas track and field athlete Mike Conley, Sr. was accused by KARK-TV in Little Rock, Arkansas of purchasing a Cadillac Escalade for McFadden, which would have jeopardized McFadden's status as an amateur athlete for the 2008 Cotton Bowl Classic and a possible senior season. KARK later retracted the report and apologized to Conley. On March 6, 2008, Electronic Arts announced that McFadden would be cover athlete for the Xbox 360's version of NCAA Football 09.

== Professional career ==
=== 2008 NFL draft ===
At the NFL Scouting Combine in Indianapolis on February 24, 2008, McFadden ran an unofficial time of 4.27 seconds and an official time of 4.33 seconds on the 40-yard dash, which was second among all running backs at the combine to only Chris Johnson, who ran a then-record 4.24. McFadden also reportedly scored a 17 on the Wonderlic exam. His selection number in the draft was subject to varying speculation. McFadden was criticized for possible character concerns stemming from two nightclub altercations and the hiring of a lawyer to handle his paternity problems.

Pre-draft measurables
Height	Weight	Arm length	Hand span	40-yard dash	10-yard split	20-yard split	20-yard shuttle	Three-cone drill	Vertical jump	Broad jump	Bench press	Wonderlic
6 ft 1 1/4 in (1.86 m)	211 lb (96 kg)	34 1/4 in (0.87 m)	9 1/2 in (0.24 m)	4.33 s	1.51 s	2.53 s	4.10 s	6.86 s	35.5 in (0.90 m)	10 ft 8 in (3.25 m)	13 reps	17
All values from NFL Combine except 20ss, 3-cone, and vertical leap from Arkansas Pro Day

=== Oakland Raiders ===
==== 2008 season ====
McFadden was selected the Oakland Raiders in the first round with the fourth overall pick in the 2008 NFL draft. The Raiders signed him to a six-year, $60.1 million contract which included $26 million in guarantees. Contract negotiations were rapid due to Raider fears of a second consecutive contract holdout as was the case with quarterback JaMarcus Russell in 2007.

At training camp, McFadden impressed Raiders coach Lane Kiffin with his ability to take instructions once and seamlessly incorporate them into his game. Media observers considered him the most complete Raiders rookie at this stage since Marcus Allen. On September 8, McFadden made his NFL debut against the Denver Broncos, where he had nine carries for 46 yards on in the 41–14 loss. McFadden scored his first professional touchdown against the Kansas City Chiefs on September 14, 2008, his second NFL game, in which he gained 164 yards on 21 carries. McFadden also suffered an injury to his big toe in this game, which limited him for the next 14 games, including three missed games. On November 23, in a game against the Broncos, McFadden scored two touchdowns, his first multi-touchdown game in his career. He ended the season with 499 yards on 113 attempts, with four touchdowns. He also made 29 receptions for 285 yards. Raiders interim head coach Tom Cable, who took over after Kiffin was fired by owner Al Davis, was criticized for not playing McFadden later in the season. Responding to criticism, Cable stated “Well what really dictated was the rotation we were in, terms of the game, the flow of the game. I think [Justin] Fargas played pretty well. It’s just those situations present themselves." Oakland Tribune writer Jerry McDonald responded to Cable's statement, saying "If the flow of the game means keeping McFadden, an excellent receiving back, off the field on third down plays which call for a pass, then the flow needs to be changed by the play-caller."

==== 2009 season ====
During the 2009 Oakland Raiders campaign, McFadden was bothered by numerous injuries and saw a career low in carries and yardage. McFadden's low point of the season came when he rushed for -2 yards in a 29–6 loss to the Houston Texans on October 4. McFadden finished the season with 104 carries for 357 rushing yards and one rushing touchdown to go along with 21 receptions for 245 receiving yards.

==== 2010 season ====
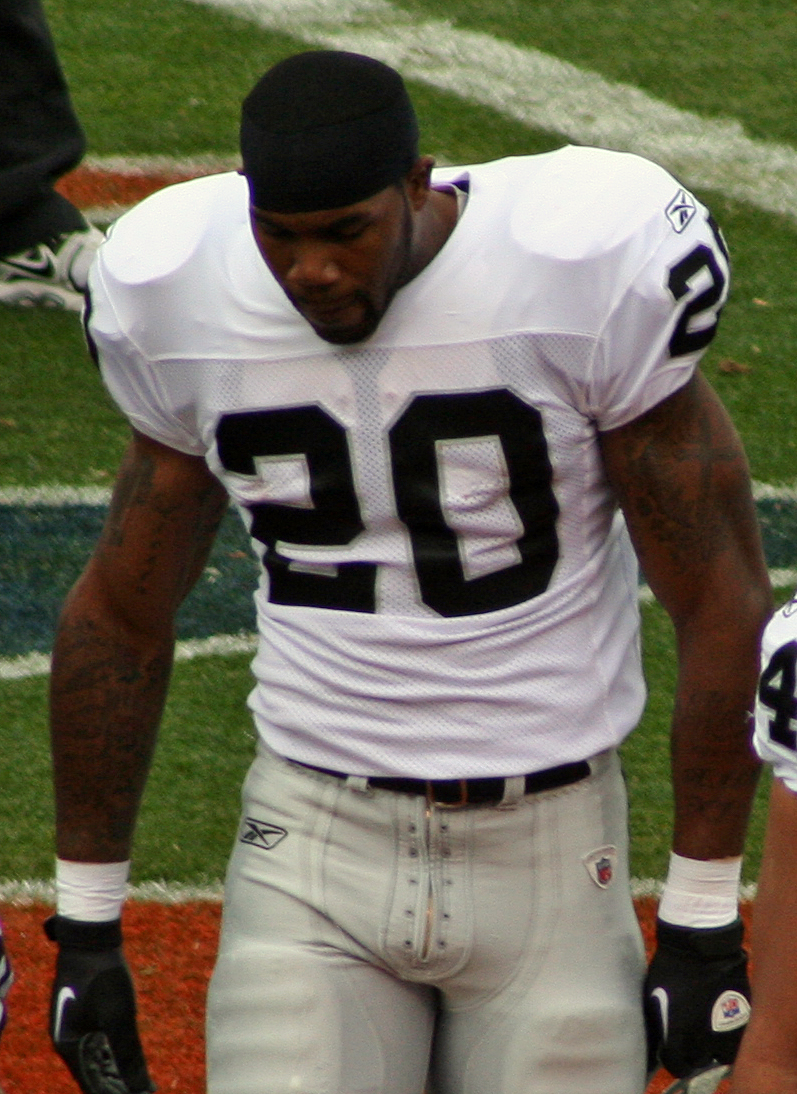
McFadden in 2010

McFadden started the 2010 season against the Tennessee Titans on September 12. He rushed for 95 yards on 18 carries. In Week 2, McFadden rushed for 145 yards on 30 carries against the St. Louis Rams. McFadden rushed for 105 yards with a rushing touchdown against the Arizona Cardinals in Week 3. McFadden missed two games due to a hamstring injury on October 3 against the Houston Texans. Upon his return on October 24, 2010, against the division rival Denver Broncos, McFadden carried the ball 16 times for a total of 165 yards and three touchdowns. He also recorded two receptions for 31 yards and a touchdown. McFadden became only the fourth player in franchise history to have four touchdowns in a game. Art Powell, Marcus Allen, and Harvey Williams were the others. He was named AFC Offensive Player of the Week for his game against Denver.

On November 21, in a 35–3 loss to the Pittsburgh Steelers, McFadden would rush for only 14 yards. Against the Miami Dolphins on November 28, McFadden struggled again. This time, he rushed for only 2 yards on 8 carries. McFadden would get on track against the San Diego Chargers in Week 13. He rushed for 97 yards on 19 carries. In Week 14 against the Jacksonville Jaguars, he had 209 scrimmage yards (123 rushing, 86 receiving) and three total touchdowns. In the following game against the Denver Broncos, he had 20 carries for 119 rushing yards in the 39–23 victory.

McFadden finished the 2010 season as one of the five most-productive NFL running backs despite playing in only 13 games. He had career highs in rushing (1,157 yards), receiving (506 yards), touchdowns (10 total—7 rushing, 3 receiving), and total yards from scrimmage (1,663 total yards). He had 6 games with at least 100 yards rushing, and a total of 9 games with at least 89 yards rushing. His rushing yards per game (89.0), total scrimmage yards (1,663) and yards per carry (5.2) were all ranked in the top five among NFL running backs. He was ranked 98th by his fellow players on the NFL Top 100 Players of 2011.

==== 2011 season ====
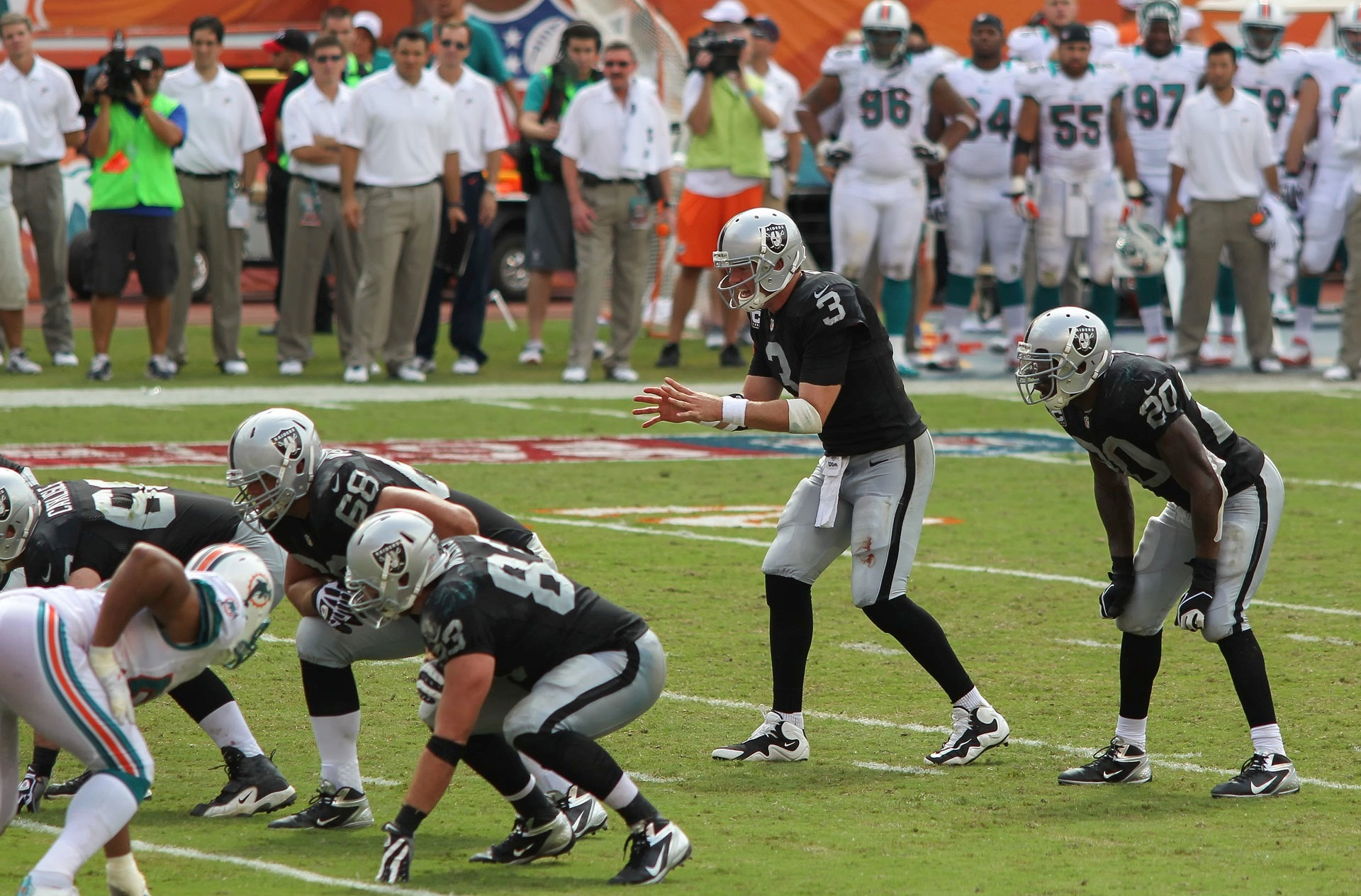
McFadden (far right) in 2012

In the Raiders' season opener against the Denver Broncos in Week 1, McFadden rushed for 150 yards on 22 carries. McFadden's 150 yards was the most ever for a Raiders running back in a season opener. The Raiders won the game 23–20. Against the Buffalo Bills in Week 2, McFadden was held to 72 yards with a rushing touchdown on 20 carries, a 3.6 average. However, McFadden found other ways to help the Raiders. He caught seven passes for 71 yards and scored a receiving touchdown. However, the Raiders lost the game 38–35. Against the New York Jets in Week 3, McFadden rushed for 171 yards, a new career high, on 19 carries to help the Raiders win 34–24. In the process, McFadden scored two rushing touchdowns. McFadden became the third running back to rush for 100 or more yards against the Jets in the Rex Ryan era. McFadden's performance earned him FedEx Ground NFL Player of the Week and AFC Offensive Player of the Week. Against the Cleveland Browns in week 6, McFadden rushed for 91 yards on 20 carries, a 4.6 average, and a rushing touchdown in the 24–17 victory.

By the end of Week 6, McFadden was leading the league in rushing with 610 yards, as well as contributing 19 receptions for 154 yards, and the Raiders were 4–2. In Week 7 against the Kansas City Chiefs, however, McFadden had to leave the game after two runs due to an aggravation of his chronic foot condition and was shut down for the remainder of the season. He was ranked 60th by his fellow players on the NFL Top 100 Players of 2012.

==== 2012 season ====
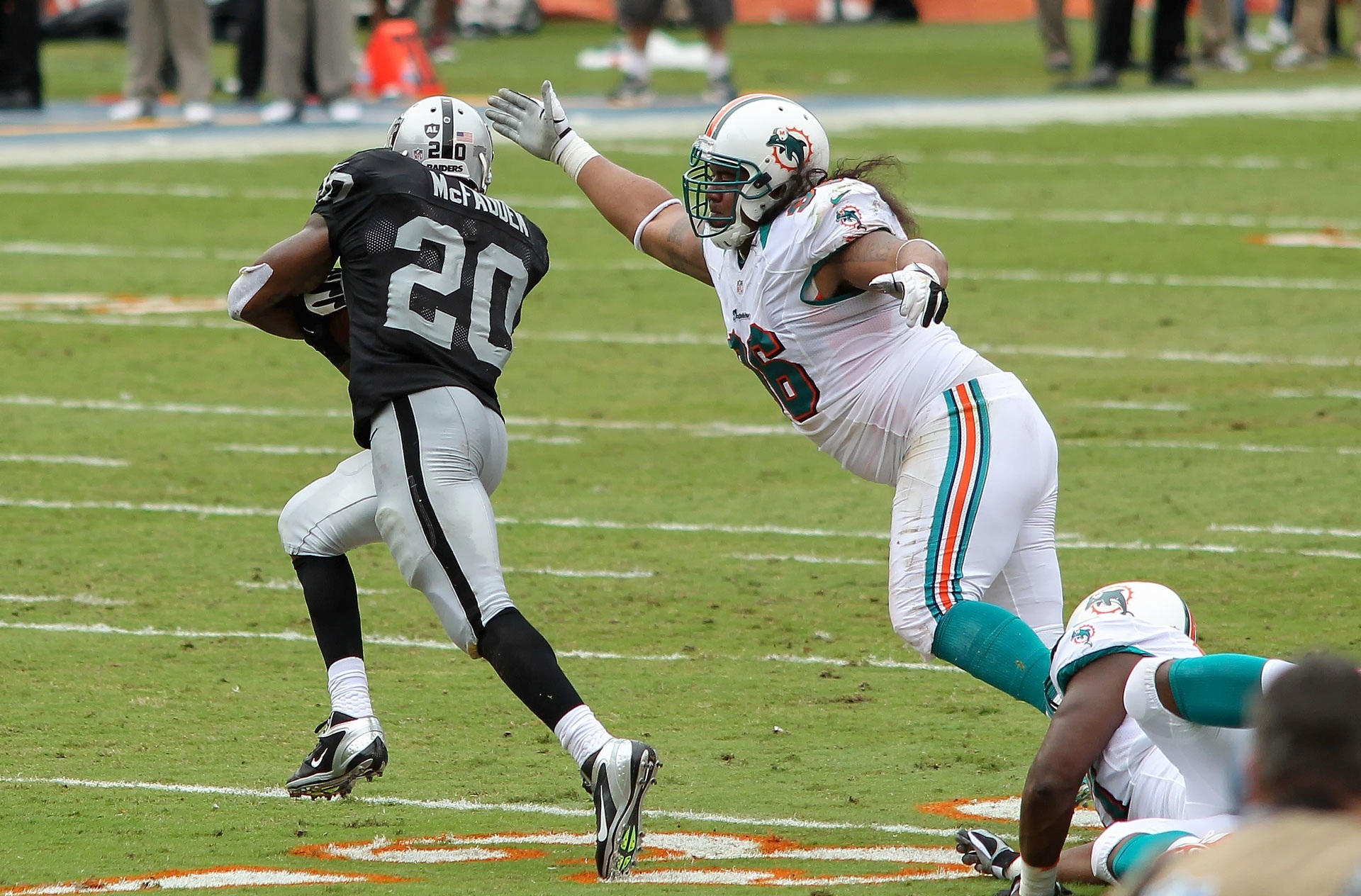
McFadden evades Paul Soliai in 2012

McFadden returned for the 2012 season, but struggled throughout the year and finished with 216 carries for 707 rushing yards and two rushing touchdowns in 12 games. He did lead the Raiders in rushing, and he recorded three 100-plus-yard rushing performances. His difficulty was attributed to his continued injury problems, as he missed another four games during the season, and the return of the zone-blocking scheme that McFadden struggled with in his first two years with the Raiders.

==== 2013 season ====
In Week 2 of the 2013 season, against the Jacksonville Jaguars, McFadden had 19 carries for 129 rushing yards in the 19–9 victory. McFadden appeared in 10 games in the 2013 season, having 114 carries for 379 yards (a 3.3 average), along with five touchdowns in a backfield where Rashad Jennings had a majority of the carries.

==== 2014 season ====
On March 11, 2014, Oakland re-signed McFadden after not re-signing Rashad Jennings. In week 14, against the San Francisco 49ers, he only carried the ball for four carries for five yards. The 2014 season marked as the first time in which Darren McFadden played a full season. He appeared in all 16 games with 12 starts. He finished the year with 155 carries for 534 yards (a 3.4-yard average) and two touchdowns. McFadden saw a decline in his number of carries due to the emergence of second-year running back Latavius Murray.

=== Dallas Cowboys ===
==== 2015 season ====
On March 13, 2015, McFadden signed a two-year deal with the Dallas Cowboys worth up to $5.85 million including a $200,000 bonus, to be one of the candidates to help replace the recently departed DeMarco Murray.

After playing off the bench in a backup role in the first five games of the season, McFadden took over the lead back role in Week 7 against the New York Giants, replacing an injured Joseph Randle and totaling a season-high 152 yards rushing and a touchdown in a road loss. It was his first 100-yard game since 2013 and the first for a Cowboys running back in 2015.

McFadden remained as the starter and finished with 1,089 rushing yards (fourth in the NFL), after only gaining 129 yards in his first five games. For the second time in his career, he was able to play in all 16 games, while posting 1,417 scrimmage yards (4th among running backs), 4.6 yards-per-carry (3rd in the NFL among the 27 running backs with at least 160 carries), five 100-yard rushing games (second in the NFL), 52 rushing first downs (fourth in the NFL), 9 20-plus-yard runs (fourth in the NFL), and 2 40-plus-yard runs (fourth in the NFL). His three rushing touchdowns was second on the team, his 40 receptions was fourth, and his 328 receiving yards was second-most in his career for a single season.

McFadden became the first former Razorback running back to register two 1,000-yard rushing seasons in an NFL career. His 100-yard rushing games were against the Giants (152 yards), Philadelphia Eagles (117 yards), Miami Dolphins (129 yards), Green Bay Packers (111 yards), and New York Jets (100 yards). McFadden also had two more games with 100-plus scrimmage yards (113 rushing-plus-receiving yards against the Seattle Seahawks and 145 rushing-plus-receiving yards against Washington).

==== 2016 season ====
McFadden entered the Organized Team Activities competing for the starting role with rookie Ezekiel Elliott and free agent acquisition Alfred Morris.

On June 14, McFadden underwent surgery after breaking his right elbow in an off-field accident at his home during the Memorial Day weekend, and was placed on the reserve/NFI list during the preseason. The surprising recovery of running back Lance Dunbar from a serious knee injury made the Cowboys decide to keep McFadden there to start the 2016 season. The success of the team and Elliott also delayed his activation to the regular season roster until December 13.

McFadden passed Morris on the depth chart as the backup running back as soon as he incorporated into his role against the Tampa Bay Buccaneers, because McFadden was seen as more of a complete player with his blocking and receiving skills. In the season finale against the Philadelphia Eagles, he was named the starter to save Elliott for the playoffs. McFadden finished the season after appearing in three games (one start), with 87 rushing yards and 17 receiving yards.

==== 2017 season ====
On March 16, McFadden signed a one-year contract extension with the Cowboys. In the preseason, Alfred Morris passed him on the depth chart to become the backup behind Ezekiel Elliott. During the regular season, the Cowboys chose to activate running back Rod Smith instead of McFadden, because he could also play on special teams. On November 26, McFadden asked for his release after being a healthy scratch for all but one game (against the Atlanta Falcons).

=== Retirement ===
On November 28, 2017, only two days after his release, McFadden announced his retirement from football after 10 seasons in the NFL.

== Career statistics ==
Legend
**Bold**	Career high

=== NFL ===
Year	Team	Games		Rushing					Receiving				
Year	Team	GP	GS	Att	Yds	Avg	Lng	TD	Rec	Yds	Avg	Lng	TD
2008	OAK	13	5	113	499	4.4	50	4	29	285	9.8	27	0
2009	OAK	12	7	104	357	3.4	28	1	21	245	**11.7**	48	0
2010	OAK	13	13	223	**1,157**	5.2	57	**7**	**47**	**507**	10.8	**67**	**3**
2011	OAK	7	7	113	614	**5.4**	**70**	4	19	154	8.1	26	1
2012	OAK	12	12	216	707	3.3	64	2	42	258	6.1	20	1
2013	OAK	10	7	114	379	3.3	30	5	17	108	6.4	16	0
2014	OAK	16	12	155	534	3.4	25	2	36	212	5.9	23	0
2015	DAL	16	10	**239**	1,089	4.6	50	3	40	328	8.2	21	0
2016	DAL	3	1	24	87	3.6	24	0	3	17	5.7	11	0
2017	DAL	1	0	1	−2	−2.0	−2	0	0	0	0.0	0	0
Career		103	74	1,302	5,421	4.2	70	28	254	2,114	8.3	67	5

=== College ===
Year	Team	GP	Rushing					Receiving					Kick return					Passing							
Year	Team	GP	Att	Yds	Avg	Lng	TD	Rec	Yds	Avg	Lng	TD	Ret	Yds	Avg	Lng	TD	Cmp	Att	Pct	Yds	Avg	Lng	TD	Int
2005	Arkansas	11	176	1,113	**6.3**	70	11	14	52	3.7	12	0	12	**348**	**29.0**	81	0	1	2	50.0	13	6.5	13	0	0
2006	Arkansas	14	284	1,647	5.8	**80**	14	11	149	**13.5**	**70**	**1**	10	262	26.2	**92**	**1**	**7**	9	**77.8**	69	7.7	28	3	**1**
2007	Arkansas	13	**325**	**1,830**	5.6	**80**	**16**	**21**	**164**	7.8	57	**1**	**16**	316	19.8	33	0	6	**11**	54.5	**123**	**11.2**	**42**	**4**	0
Career		38	785	4,590	5.8	80	41	46	365	7.9	70	2	38	926	24.4	92	1	14	22	63.6	205	9.3	42	7	1

== Personal life ==
In June 2016, McFadden filed a $15 million lawsuit in the United States District Court for the Eastern District of Arkansas against his longtime business manager, Michael Vick (no relation to former NFL player of the same name). McFadden alleged that Vick defrauded him and misappropriated funds, including $3 million lost in a bitcoin-related business venture.

In December 2019, McFadden was enshrined into the College Football Hall of Fame.

As of 2020, McFadden has six children with three different women. He is now married.

McFadden has spoken publicly about his past battle with alcohol addiction and celebration of his two years of sobriety. He's stated that May 18, 2023 was the date of his last drink. He shared his recovery journey at the Wolfe Street Foundation Red Carpet Gala in April 2024. He considers his sobriety a life-changing decision, leading to greater happiness and pride in himself and his family. He aims to help others by sharing his experience and offering support to those struggling with addiction.

McFadden is an avid rabbit hunter.

== Legal issues ==
On January 21, 2019, McFadden was arrested for drunk driving and resisting arrest in a Dallas-Fort Worth Whataburger parking lot. Police say he had fallen asleep behind the wheel of a 2019 GMC Yukon in the Whataburger drive-thru. During the incident, cops say McFadden was resisting officers, after which they took him to a nearby station where he was booked for DWI and resisting arrest. He was released on bond a short time later. He pleaded guilty to DWI on February 14, 2020, and was sentenced to four days in jail.
