= Robert Felton (American football) =

American football player (born 1984)

Profile
- Position: Guard

Personal information
- Born: September 25, 1984 (age 42); Houston, Texas, U.S.
- Listed height: 6 ft 4 in (1.93 m)
- Listed weight: 325 lb (147 kg)

Career information
- College: Arkansas
- NFL draft: 2008: undrafted

Career history
- Buffalo Bills (2008)*; Oakland Raiders (2008)*
- * Offseason or practice squad member only

Awards and highlights
- Second-team All-American (2007); First-team All-SEC (2007); Arkansas Razorback All-Decade Team 2010

Robert Felton (born September 25, 1984) is an American former football guard. He played college football for the Arkansas Razorbacks. He was signed by the Buffalo Bills as an undrafted free agent in 2008.

Felton attended the University of Arkansas. He started 42 games while he played for the Razorbacks. Felton also was awarded 1st team All-SEC honors 2007, 2nd Team AP All-American Honors 2007, and is a member of the Arkansas Razorback All-Decade Team 2010.

Felton has degrees in sociology and criminal justice.

Felton was also a member of the Oakland Raiders.

Recently Robert Felton has been featured on an ESPN Radio Show in Fayetteville, Ar where he still lives
