= 2008 BCS National Championship Game =

College football bowl game

2008 Allstate BCS National Championship Game
- BCS Bowl Game
LSU Tigers	Ohio State Buckeyes
(11–2)	(11–1)
SEC	Big Ten
38	24
Head coach: Les Miles	Head coach: Jim Tressel
AP / Coaches / BCS; 2 / 2 / 2	AP / Coaches / BCS; 1 / 1 / 1
	1	2	3	4	Total
LSU	3	21	7	7	38
Ohio State	10	0	7	7	24
- Date: January 7, 2008
- Season: 2007
- Stadium: Louisiana Superdome
- Location: New Orleans, Louisiana
- MVP: Offense: QB Matt Flynn (LSU); Defense: DE Ricky Jean-Francois (LSU)
- Favorite: LSU by 5½
- National anthem: Preservation Hall Jazz Band
- Referee: Jon Bible (Big 12)
- Halftime show: Allstate Alumni Kicker Challenge, Ohio State's marching band, LSU's Marching band
- Attendance: 79,651
- Payout: US$17,500,000 per conference

United States TV coverage
- Network: Fox
- Announcers: Thom Brennaman, Charles Davis, and Chris Myers
- Nielsen ratings: 14.4

International TV coverage
- Network: ESPN Radio
- Announcers: Brent Musburger, Kirk Herbstreit, and Lisa Salters

The 2008 BCS National Championship Game (branded as the 2008 Allstate BCS National Championship Game for sponsorship reasons) was played at the Louisiana Superdome in New Orleans, Louisiana, on Monday, January 7, 2008, and featured the No. 1 and No. 2 college football teams in the United States as determined by the BCS Poll (a combination of polls and computer formulas) to decide the BCS National Championship for the 2007 NCAA Division I FBS football season.

The game featured No. 1 Big Ten champion Ohio State Buckeyes hosting No. 2 SEC champion LSU Tigers. It also featured the second postseason matchup between head coaches Jim Tressel and Les Miles in four seasons. The first was the 2004 Alamo Bowl, when Tressel's Buckeyes defeated Miles' Oklahoma State Cowboys, 33–7, in what turned out to be Miles' last game with the Cowboys, as he was hired by LSU to replace Nick Saban five days later. In the BCS National Championship Game, the Tigers defeated the Buckeyes by a 38–24 score to win their second national championship in five years and first consensus national championship since 1958.

== Background ==
=== Team selection ===
Prior to the last weekend of the regular season, it looked like the national championship game would be played between Missouri and West Virginia. However, Missouri lost to Oklahoma 38-17 in the Big 12 Championship Game and West Virginia was shocked by their arch-rival Pitt 13-9 in the Backyard Brawl. This threw the BCS and college football world into upheaval. By virtue of winning the Big Ten and having only one loss, Ohio State looked to be guaranteed a berth in the BCS championship game. After much speculation, LSU was revealed to be the number two team in the ratings and therefore the Buckeyes' opponent in the title game.

=== Pregame buildup ===
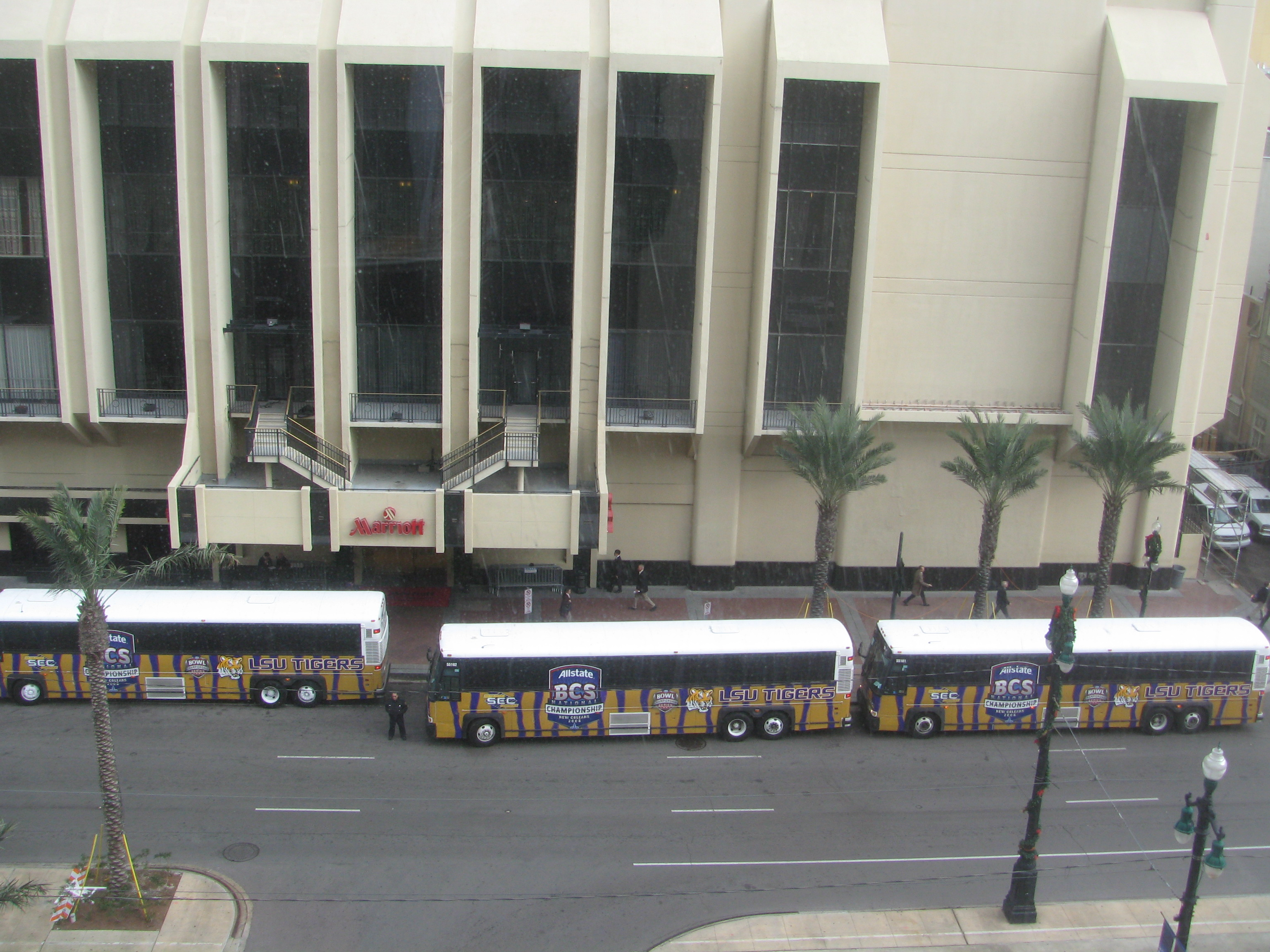
LSU Tigers football team bus at New Orleans Marriott viewed from Sheraton New Orleans

After intense media speculation, including a report on ESPN which indicated that he was on the verge of taking the Michigan job, LSU head coach Les Miles announced just before the SEC championship game on December 1 that he was staying. Shortly thereafter, he agreed to a contract extension at LSU. Additionally, LSU defensive coordinator Bo Pelini accepted the head coaching job at Nebraska the day after the SEC title game. With the blessing of Nebraska athletic director Tom Osborne, Pelini returned to Baton Rouge to prepare for the BCS championship game.

As for the Buckeyes, two cornerbacks, Donald Washington and Eugene Clifford, were reported to be suspended for this game for violating team rules. However, Ohio State's athletic director said on December 27 that the reported suspension of Washington was erroneous.

== Game summary ==
=== First quarter ===
LSU won the coin toss and deferred to the second half. After receiving the opening kickoff, Ohio State started slowly on offense before Chris Wells broke off a 65-yard touchdown run for the first score of the game. LSU went three-and-out deep in their own territory and punted on their first possession. Ohio State quickly added a field goal by Ryan Pretorius to go up 10-0. LSU then marched efficiently down field, but their 14-play/65-yard drive stalled in the red zone and Colt David kicked a 32-yard field goal. The first quarter ended with LSU on offense and trailing, 10-3.

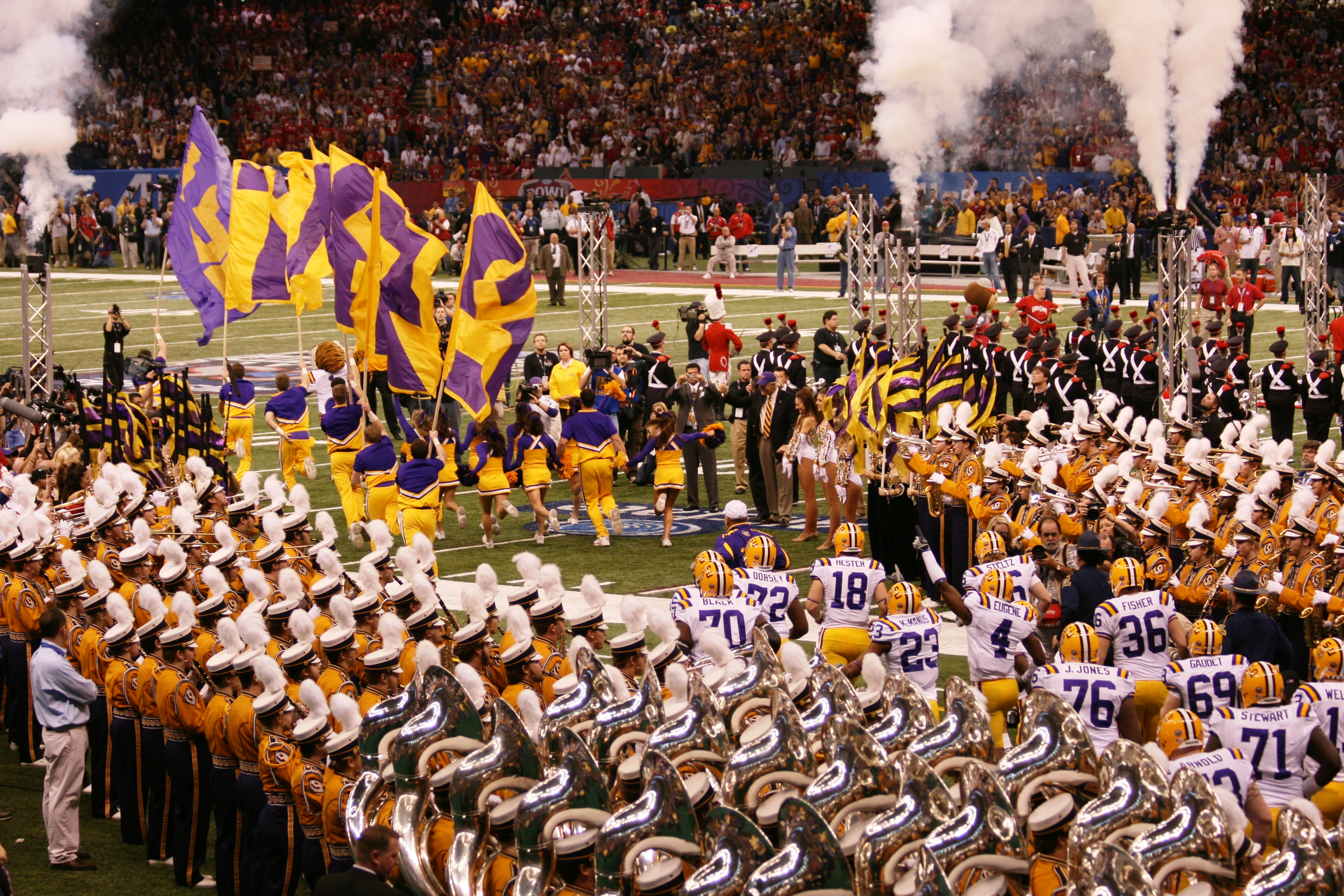
The LSU football team runs onto the field at the Louisiana Superdome prior to the start of the game.

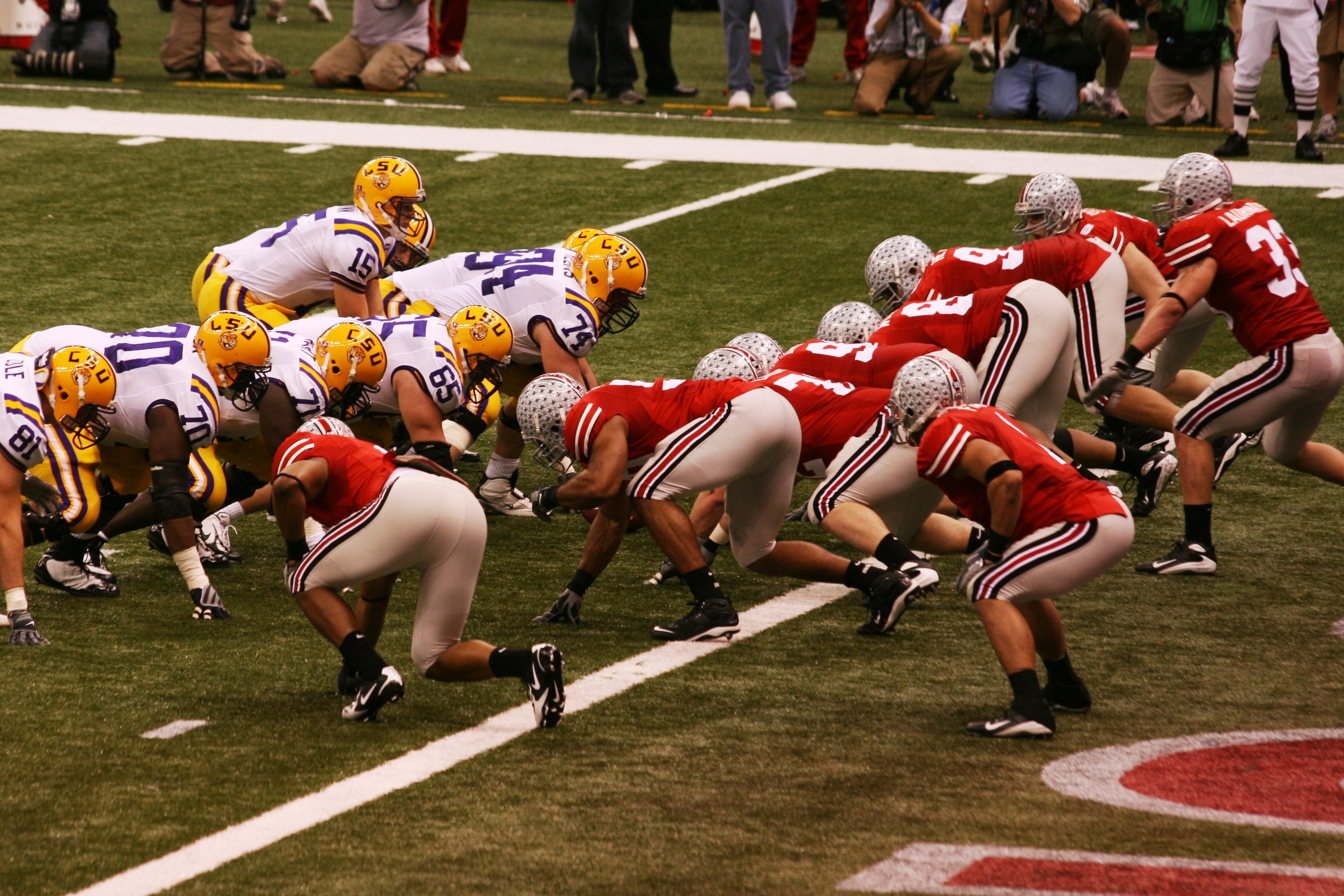
The Tigers line up on offense against the Buckeyes.

=== Second quarter ===
LSU scored early in the period with a 13-yard Matt Flynn touchdown pass to Tight end Richard Dickson, tying the score at 10. The drive was aided by two penalties totaling 28 yards by Ohio State's defense. LSU's Ricky Jean-Francois then blocked a 38-yard Pretorius field goal attempt on Ohio State's next possession. Momentum appeared to be shifting to LSU's sideline. LSU began the ensuing drive from their 34. The Tigers marched 66 yards in 3:28; a 10-yard Brandon LaFell touchdown reception from Flynn culminated the drive. On the next Buckeye possession, quarterback Todd Boeckman was intercepted by cornerback Chevis Jackson who returned the ball 34 yards into Ohio State territory. LSU moved down to the goal line and running back Jacob Hester punched the ball in to give the Tigers a 14-point lead. A short Buckeye drive led to a punt and LSU was content to go into halftime having scored 24 unanswered points.

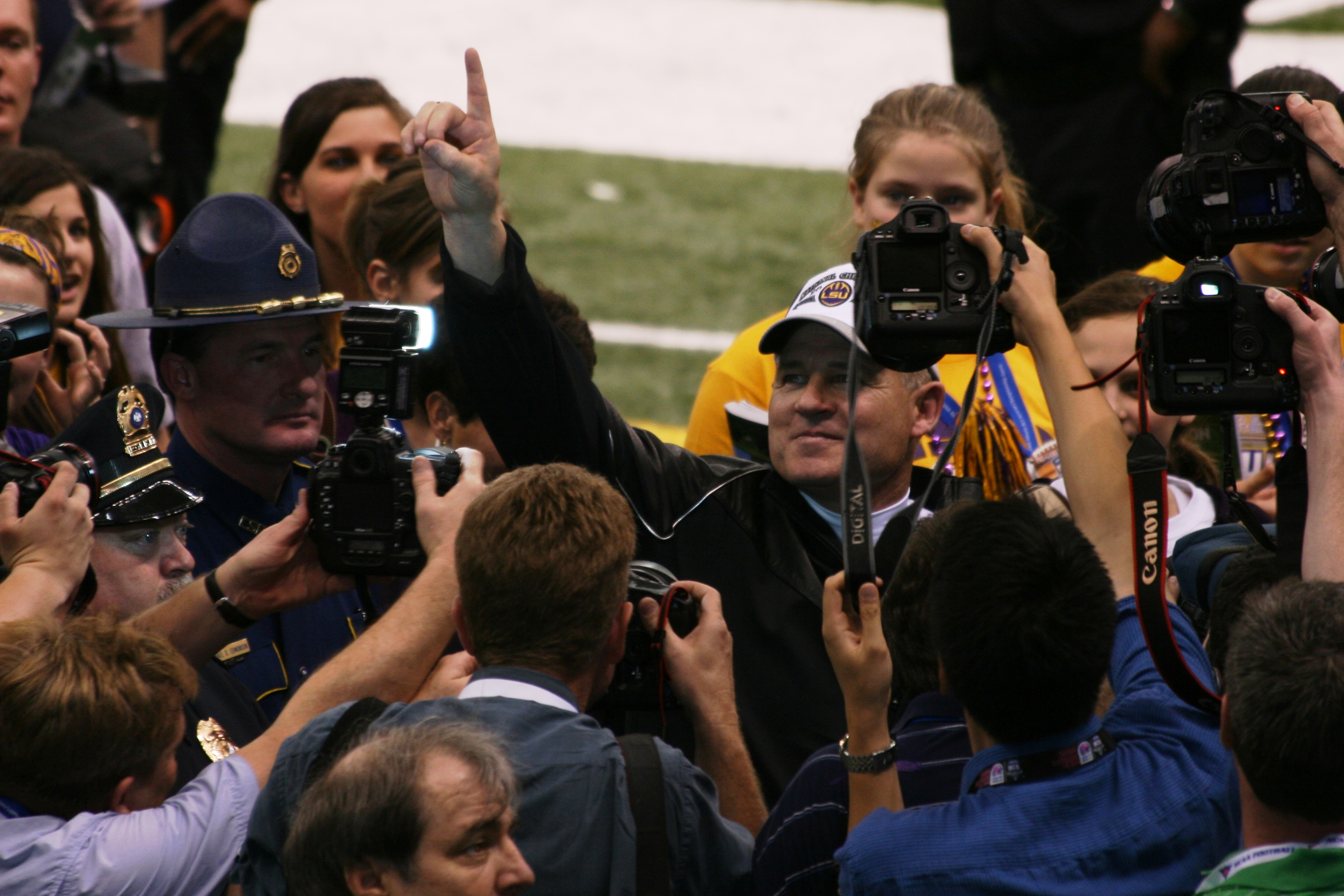
Les Miles celebrates his team's victory in the 2008 BCS National Championship Game. Miles is now 1-1 in BCS National Championship games.

=== Third quarter ===
LSU started the second half with the ball and a 24-10 lead. The Ohio State defense appeared to have forced a punt on LSU's first drive, but a roughing the punter penalty by Buckeye linebacker Austin Spitler gave LSU a first down. The Tigers parlayed the personal foul into a touchdown, as Early Doucet later received a short pass from Flynn and broke a series of tackles at the five-yard line and walked into the endzone. Ohio State seemed to be fading but with 3:50 left in the quarter, Flynn was intercepted by cornerback Malcolm Jenkins, who returned the ball 21 yards to the LSU 11. Three "Beanie" Wells runs brought the Buckeye offense down to the five and Boeckman proceeded to throw a touchdown pass to wide receiver Brian Robiskie on fourth down, pulling the Buckeyes to within 31-17.

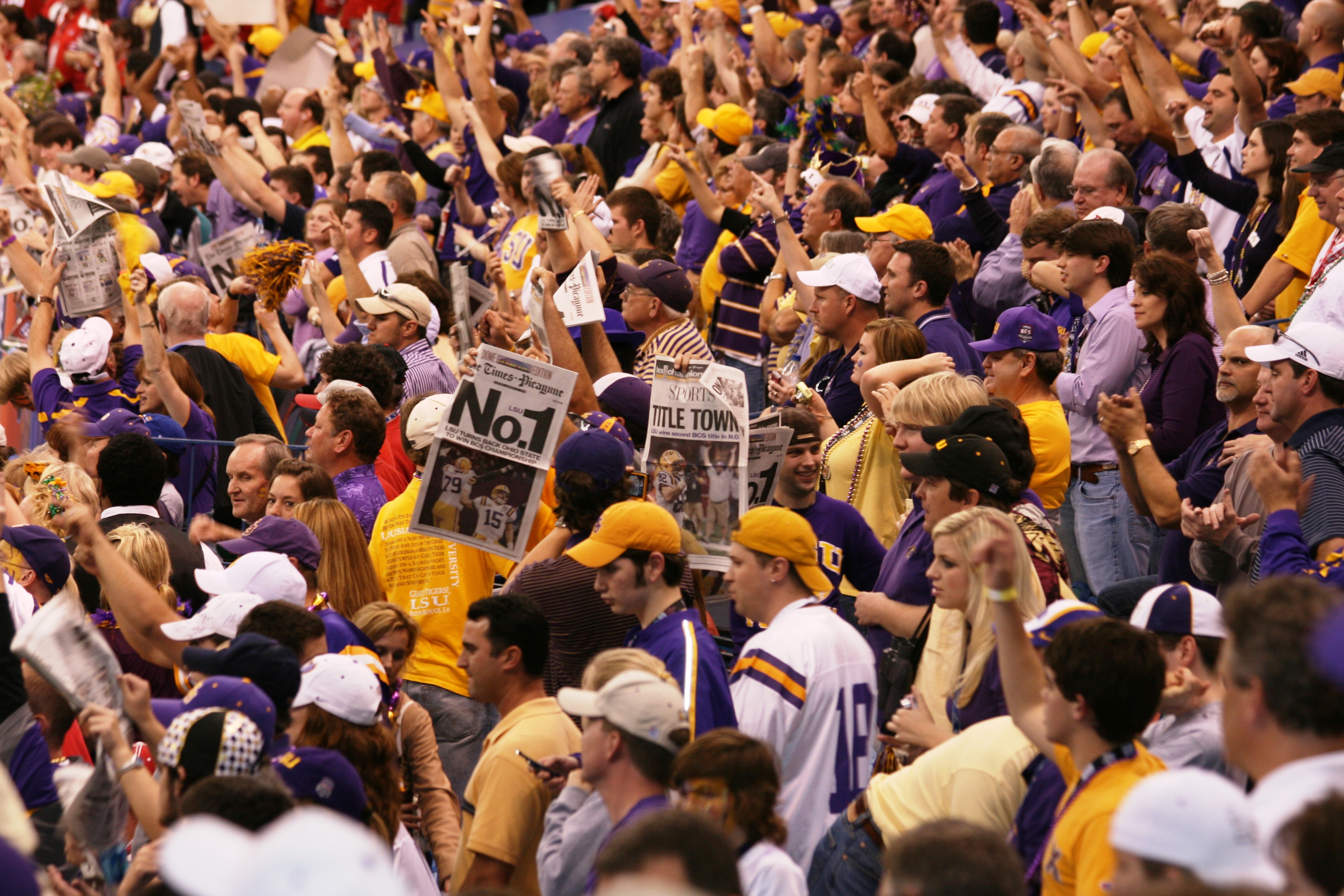
LSU fans celebrate their team's victory by holding up copies of The Times-Picayune newspaper of the next day.

=== Fourth quarter ===
After LSU punted early in the quarter Ohio State put together a solid drive, reaching the LSU 34. However, the offense stalled and the Buckeyes were forced to go for it on fourth-and-seven. Boeckman dropped back to pass and was hit on his throwing arm just before the arm could start to come forward. The hit—made by LSU linebacker Ali Highsmith—caused a fumble and LSU recovered in Ohio State territory. The play was reviewed to determine if it was a forward pass but the ruling on the field was upheld and LSU got the ball with 10:37 left in the game. The Tigers then went three-and-out, but on Ohio State's next possession Boeckman was intercepted by safety Curtis Taylor. With 5:37 remaining, LSU's fate as National Champions was essentially sealed.

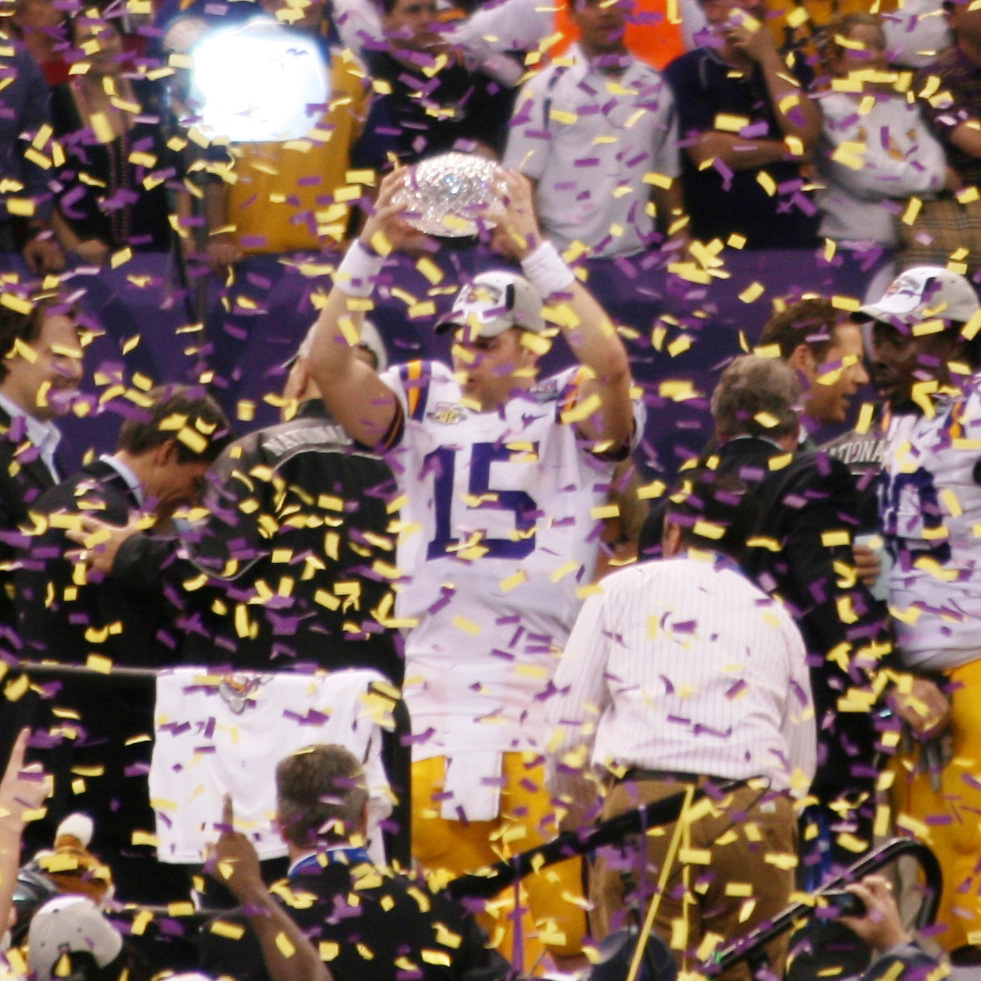
Offensive MVP Matt Flynn holds up the Waterford Crystal National Championship Coaches' Trophy while Defensive MVP Ricky Jean-Francois celebrates on stage.

The Tigers added another touchdown, a five-yard strike from Flynn to LaFell (his second touchdown reception of the game). Ohio State then scored on a late touchdown pass from Boeckman to wide receiver Brian Hartline before failing to convert an onside kick. LSU ran out the clock and celebrated their 38-24 BCS National Championship Game win.

== Historical implications ==
This was the first national championship game in the BCS era to feature two teams that had previously won a BCS national championship. Louisiana State became the first school ever to win two BCS championships. The Tigers had previously defeated Oklahoma, 21-14, in the 2004 Sugar Bowl, which served as the 2003 season's BCS championship game.

LSU was the first team since 1960 to be national champion with two losses.

== Scoring summary ==
=== Scoring ===
First quarter

- Ohio State - Chris Wells 69 Yd TD Run (Ryan Pretorius Kick) 13:34
- Ohio State - Ryan Pretorius -25 Yd FG 9:12
- LSU - Colt David 32 Yd FG 2:21

Second quarter

- LSU - Richard Dickson 13 Yd TD Pass From Matt Flynn (Colt David Kick) 13:00
- LSU - Brandon LaFell 10 Yd TD Pass From Matt Flynn (Colt David Kick) 7:25
- LSU - Jacob Hester 1 Yd TD Run (Colt David Kick) 4:16

Third quarter

- LSU - Earley Doucet 4 Yd TD Pass From Matt Flynn (Colt David Kick) 9:04
- Ohio State - Brian Robiskie 5 Yd TD Pass From Todd Boeckman (Ryan Pretorius Kick) 1:38

Fourth quarter

- LSU - Richard Dickson 5 Yd TD Pass From Matt Flynn (Colt David Kick) 1:50
- Ohio State - Brian Hartline 15 TD Pass From Todd Boeckman (Ryan Pretorius Kick) 1:13

== Statistics ==
Statistical comparison
	LSU	OSU
1st downs	25	17
Total yards	326	353
Passing yards	174	208
Rushing yards	152	145
Penalties	4-36	7-83
3rd down conversions	11-18	3-13
4th down conversions	1-1	2-3
Turnovers	1	3
Time of Possession	33:56	26:04

=== LSU ===
- QB Matt Flynn: 19/27, 174 yds, 4 TD
- RB Jacob Hester: 21 rush, 86 yds, TD
- WR Early Doucet: 7 rec, 51 yds, TD
- TE Richard Dickson: 4 rec, 44 yds, 2 TD

=== Ohio State ===
- QB Todd Boeckman: 15/26, 208 yds, 2 TD, 2 Int
- RB Chris Wells: 20 rush, 146 yds, TD
- WR Brian Hartline: 6 rec, 75 yds, TD

== Game records ==
Individual	Performance, Team vs. Opponent	Year
Tackles	18, James Laurinaitis, Ohio State vs. LSU	2008
Long Plays	Performance, Team vs. Opponent	Year
Touchdown run	65, Chris "Beanie" Wells, Ohio State vs. LSU	2008
Punt	63, A.J. Trapasso, Ohio State vs. LSU	2008

== Trivia ==
- Baton Rouge attorney Stephen Babcock got the judge in an insurance case to issue a continuance in the case by pointing out that both he and the opposing attorney had tickets to the game, and "All counsel to this matter unequivocally agree that the presence of LSU in the aforementioned contest of pigskin skill unquestionably constitutes good grounds". The judge obliged and moved the trial date.
