= 2008 Cincinnati Bengals season =

NFL team season

- Owner: Mike Brown
- Head coach: Marvin Lewis
- Home stadium: Paul Brown Stadium

Results
- Record: 4–11–1
- Division place: 3rd AFC North
- Playoffs: Did not qualify
- Pro Bowlers: None

Uniform
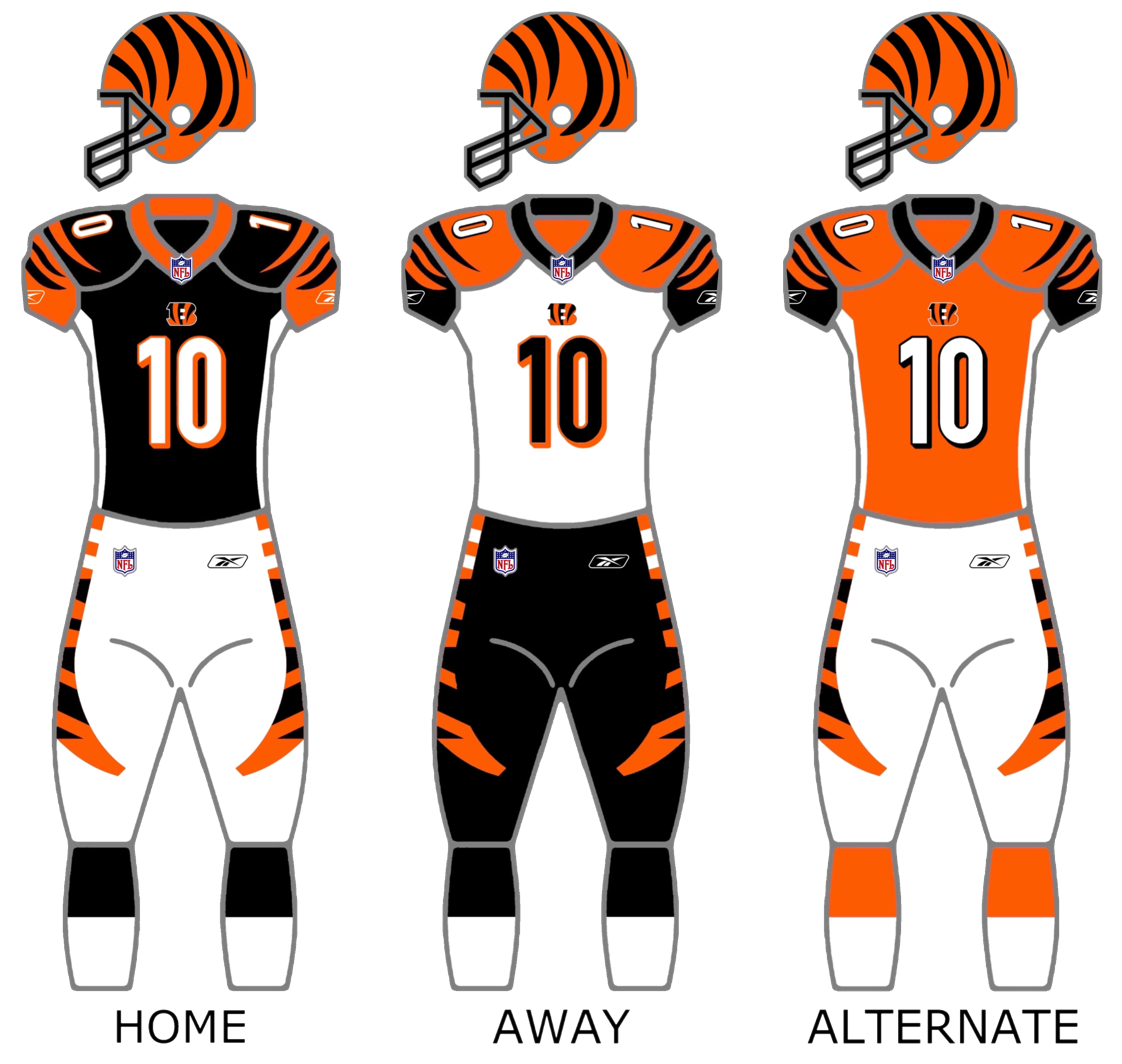

The 2008 Cincinnati Bengals season was the franchise's 39th season in the National Football League (NFL), the 41st overall, and the 6th under head coach Marvin Lewis. The team finished the season with 4 wins, 11 losses, and 1 tie, and missed the playoffs for the 3rd consecutive year.

== Offseason ==
=== Coaching changes ===
This season marked head coach Marvin Lewis's sixth year with the Bengals. His offensive coordinator, Bob Bratkowski, remained with the team, but his defensive coordinator from 2007 to 2008, Chuck Bresnahan, was not retained. He was replaced by Mike Zimmer and Jeff FitzGerald replaced Ricky Hunley as linebacker coach.

=== Season theme ===
Typically Lewis has had a theme for the upcoming season for the team to rally around. For the 2008 season it was "Now"

=== Departures ===
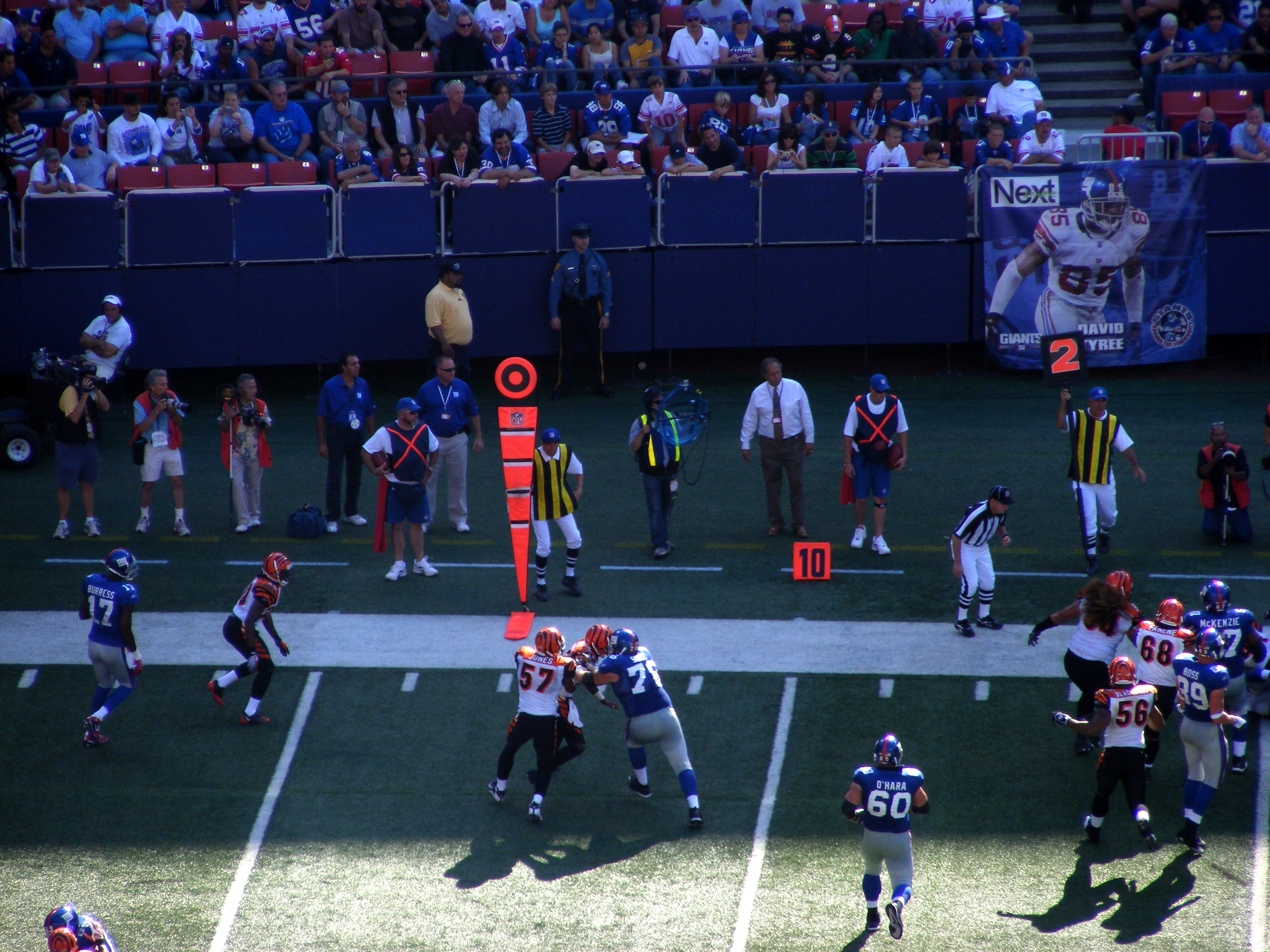
The Bengals visit the New York Giants at Giants Stadium, September 21

- Madieu Williams, Safety signed with the Minnesota Vikings.
- Justin Smith, Defensive end signed with the San Francisco 49ers.
- Landon Johnson, Linebacker signed with the Carolina Panthers.
- Willie Anderson, the long time Offensive Lineman was released and signed by the division rival Baltimore Ravens.
- Rudi Johnson was released and signed by the Detroit Lions.
- Ahmad Brooks, Linebacker, who was allegedly involved in an assault for punching a woman in the face late April, was released before the season began.
- David Pollack, who was injured during his second season in the NFL with the Bengals and suffered paralysis, declined to return to football and officially retired.
- Chris Henry was released from the team on the same day a press release in the local paper announced his alleged involvement in an assault occurring within Cincinnati. A few weeks after Marvin Lewis made the public declaration that Henry would never play for the Bengals again he was re-signed. He was ineligible to play the first 4 regular season games as punishment for his involvement with criminal charges against him which were dropped before his reinstatement.
- Odell Thurman, a linebacker suspended for two consecutive years, was declared eligible to return to the NFL. He was then waived in May when Lewis cited that they had not seen enough of Odell to evaluate him properly. Less than a month later Odell was indefinitely suspended from the NFL for violating their substance abuse policy.

=== Signings ===
- Ben Utecht, a tight end previously with the Indianapolis Colts
- Antwan Odom, a defensive end previously with the Tennessee Titans
- Doug Gabriel, a wide receiver previously with the Oakland Raiders. He was released from the Bengals on May 29, 2008.

=== NFL draft ===
The Bengals gained an additional four picks for compensation of losing certain players.

2008 Cincinnati Bengals draft
Round	Pick	Player	Position	College	Notes
1	9	Keith Rivers	Linebacker	USC	
2	46	Jerome Simpson	Wide receiver	Coastal Carolina	
3	77	Pat Sims	Defensive tackle	Auburn	
3	97	Andre Caldwell	Wide receiver	Florida	compensatory selection
4	112	Anthony Collins	Offensive tackle	Kansas	
5	145	Jason Shirley	Defensive tackle	Fresno State	
6	177	Corey Lynch	Safety	Appalachian State	
6	207	Matt Sherry	Tight end	Villanova	compensatory selection
7	244	Angelo Craig	Defensive end	Cincinnati	compensatory selection
7	246	Mario Urrutia	Wide receiver	Louisville	compensatory selection
Made roster

== Staff ==
Cincinnati Bengals 2008 staff
Front office: Principal owner/president/general manager – Mike Brown; Executive vice president – Katie Blackburn; Senior vice president of player personnel – Pete Brown; Vice president of player personnel – Paul H. Brown; Vice President - John Sayer; Vice President - Troy Blackburn; Director of player personnel – Duke Tobin; Director of Football Operations - Jim Lippincott; Head coaches: Head coach – Marvin Lewis; Assistant head coach/offensive line – Paul Alexander; Offensive coaches: Offensive coordinator – Bob Bratkowski; Quarterbacks – Ken Zampese; Running backs – Jim Anderson; Wide receivers – Mike Sheppard; Tight ends – Jonathan Hayes; Assistant Offensive line - Bob Surace	Defensive coaches: Defensive coordinator – Mike Zimmer; Defensive line – Jay Hayes; Linebackers – Jeff FitzGerald; Defensive backs – Kevin Coyle; Assistant defensive backs – Louie Cioffi; Special teams coaches: Special teams – Darrin Simmons; Assistant special teams/assistant linebackers – Paul Guenther; Strength and conditioning: Strength and conditioning – Chip Morton; Assistant strength and conditioning – Ray Oliver

== Roster ==
2008 Cincinnati Bengals roster
Quarterbacks (QB): 11 Ryan Fitzpatrick; 9 Carson Palmer; 5 Jordan Palmer; Running backs (RB): 32 Cedric Benson; 39 James Johnson; 23 Chris Perry; 33 Kenny Watson; Wide receivers (WR): 87 Andre Caldwell KR; 15 Chris Henry; 16 Glenn Holt KR; 84 T. J. Houshmandzadeh; 85 Chad Ochocinco; 89 Jerome Simpson; Tight ends (TE): 86 Daniel Coats; 82 Reggie Kelly; 80 Nate Lawrie; 81 Ben Utecht	Offensive linemen (OL): 79 Stacy Andrews T; 73 Anthony Collins T; 60 Andrew Crummey C; 53 Eric Ghiaciuc C; 76 Levi Jones T; 62 Nate Livings G; 66 Evan Mathis G; 74 Dennis Roland T; 63 Bobbie Williams G; Defensive linemen (DL): 56 Darryl Blackstock DE; 68 Jonathan Fanene DE; 96 Chris Harrington DE; 95 Orien Harris DT; 98 Antwan Odom DE; 94 Domata Peko DT; 99 Jason Shirley DT; 90 Pat Sims DT; 97 John Thornton DT	Linebackers (LB): 93 Rashad Jeanty OLB; 59 Brandon Johnson OLB; 57 Dhani Jones MLB; 58 Jim Maxwell OLB; 51 Corey Mays; Defensive backs (DB): 40 John Busing FS; 21 Simeon Castille CB; 42 Chris Crocker FS; 44 Mike Doss SS; 25 Jamar Fletcher CB; 29 Leon Hall CB; 34 Kyries Hebert SS; 20 David Jones CB; 41 Chinedum Ndukwe SS; 24 Geoffrey Pope CB; Special teams (ST): 17 Shayne Graham K; 19 Kyle Larson P; 48 Brad St. Louis LS	Practice squad: -- Carl-Johan Björk LB ^{Int'l}; -- James Blair G; -- Marcus Brown CB; -- Digger Bujnoch C; -- Victor DeGrate DE; 14 Maurice Purify WR; 38 J. D. Runnels RB; 18 Mario Urrutia WR; Reserve: 69 Kirk Barton T (IR); 83 Antonio Chatman (IR); 64 Kyle Cook C (IR); 27 DeDe Dorsey RB (IR); 91 Robert Geathers DE (IR); 50 Eric Henderson DE (IR); 52 Abdul Hodge LB (IR); 28 Dexter Jackson S (IR); 22 Johnathan Joseph CB (IR); 75 Scott Kooistra G/T (IR); 47 Corey Lynch S (IR); 55 Keith Rivers LB (IR); 92 Frostee Rucker DE (IR); 65 Dan Santucci C (IR); 88 Matt Sherry TE (IR); 26 Marvin White S (IR); 77 Andrew Whitworth G (IR); Rookies in italics 53 active, 17 reserve, 8 practice squad

== Schedule ==
=== Preseason ===
Week	Date	Opponent	Result	Record	Venue	Recap
1	August 11	Green Bay Packers	**W** 20–17	1–0	Lambeau Field	Recap
2	August 17	Detroit Lions	**L** 10–27	1–1	Paul Brown Stadium	Recap
3	August 23	New Orleans Saints	**L** 0–13	1–2	Paul Brown Stadium	Recap
4	August 28	Indianapolis Colts	**W** 27–7	2–2	Lucas Oil Stadium	Recap

=== Regular season ===
Week	Date	Opponent	Result	Record	Venue	Recap
1	September 7	at **Baltimore Ravens**	**L** 10–17	0–1	M&T Bank Stadium	Recap
2	September 14	Tennessee Titans	**L** 7–24	0–2	Paul Brown Stadium	Recap
3	September 21	at New York Giants	**L** 23–26 (OT)	0–3	Giants Stadium	Recap
4	September 28	**Cleveland Browns**	**L** 12–20	0–4	Paul Brown Stadium	Recap
5	October 5	at Dallas Cowboys	**L** 22–31	0–5	Texas Stadium	Recap
6	October 12	at New York Jets	**L** 14–26	0–6	Giants Stadium	Recap
7	October 19	**Pittsburgh Steelers**	**L** 10–38	0–7	Paul Brown Stadium	Recap
8 (Note: The Bengals-Texans game was moved from Week 10 to Week 8 to accommodate schedule changes needed as a result of damage to Reliant Stadium as a result of Hurricane Ike.)	October 26	at Houston Texans	**L** 6–35	0–8	Reliant Stadium	Recap
9	November 2	Jacksonville Jaguars	**W** 21–19	1–8	Paul Brown Stadium	Recap
10	Bye					
11	November 16	Philadelphia Eagles	**T** 13–13 (OT)	1–8–1	Paul Brown Stadium	Recap
12	November 20	at **Pittsburgh Steelers**	**L** 10–27	1–9–1	Heinz Field	Recap
13	November 30	**Baltimore Ravens**	**L** 3–34	1–10–1	Paul Brown Stadium	Recap
14	December 7	at Indianapolis Colts	**L** 3–35	1–11–1	Lucas Oil Stadium	Recap
15	December 14	Washington Redskins	**W** 20–13	2–11–1	Paul Brown Stadium	Recap
16	December 21	at **Cleveland Browns**	**W** 14–0	3–11–1	Cleveland Browns Stadium	Recap
17	December 28	Kansas City Chiefs	**W** 16–6	4–11–1	Paul Brown Stadium	Recap

Note: Intra-division opponents are in bold text.

== Standings ==
AFC North
	W	L	T	PCT	DIV	CONF	PF	PA	STK
^{(2)} Pittsburgh Steelers	12	4	0	.750	6–0	10–2	347	223	W1
^{(6)} Baltimore Ravens	11	5	0	.688	4–2	8–4	385	244	W2
Cincinnati Bengals	4	11	1	.281	1–5	3–9	204	364	W3
Cleveland Browns	4	12	0	.250	1–5	3–9	232	350	L6

== Regular season results ==
=== Week 1: at Baltimore Ravens ===
Quarter	1	2	3	4	Total
Bengals	0	3	0	7	10
Ravens	7	3	7	0	17

at M&T Bank Stadium, Baltimore, Maryland

- Game time: 1:00 pm EDT
- Game weather: 78 °F (26 °C) (Sunny)
- Game attendance: 70,978
- Referee: Scott Green
- TV announcers (CBS): Kevin Harlan & Rich Gannon

Starter, Dexter Jackson, was inactive due to injury.

The Bengals began their 2008 campaign on the road against their AFC North foe, the Baltimore Ravens. In the first quarter, Cincinnati trailed early as Ravens WR Mark Clayton turned a double reverse play into a 42-yard TD run. In the second quarter, the Bengals continued to struggle as kicker Matt Stover gave Baltimore a 21-yard field goal. Cincinnati would reply as kicker Shayne Graham nailed a 43-yard field goal. However, in the third quarter, the Bengals continued to show their dismal defense as Ravens QB Joe Flacco got a 38-yard TD run. In the fourth quarter, the Bengals tried to rally as CB Johnathan Joseph returned a fumble 65 yards for a touchdown. However, Baltimore's defense stiffened and held on for the win.

With the loss, Cincinnati began their season at 0–1. It became the team's first regular season opening loss since 2004.

=== Week 2: vs. Tennessee Titans ===
Quarter	1	2	3	4	Total
Titans	0	14	3	7	24
Bengals	0	7	0	0	7

at Paul Brown Stadium, Cincinnati, Ohio

- Game time: 1:00 pm EST
- Game weather: 88 °F (31 °C) (Partly Cloudy & Very Windy)
- Game attendance: 64,540
- Referee: Alberto Riveron
- TV announcers (CBS): Don Criqui & Dan Fouts

Starter Dexter Jackson was inactive for the game due to injury.

Hoping to rebound from their divisional road loss to the Ravens, the Bengals played their Week 2 home opener against the Tennessee Titans. At the beginning of the game the winds were marked at 20 mph (32 km/h) and picked up intensity as the game continued, with gusts to hurricane force at times due to the passage of the remnants of Hurricane Ike. After a scoreless first quarter, Cincinnati trailed as Titans RB LenDale White got a 1-yard TD run. The Bengals would respond with RB Chris Perry getting his first career TD on a 13-yard run. However, Tennessee would begin its domination with QB Kerry Collins completing an 11-yard TD pass to WR Justin Gage. In the third quarter, Cincinnati continued to struggle as kicker Rob Bironas nailed a 34-yard field goal. In the fourth quarter, the Titans sealed the win with LB Keith Bulluck blocking and recovering a punt within Cincy's endzone for a touchdown.

During the game, the wind was such a factor that it aided the Titan's punter who, with a quick 1-step drop, kicked a punt traveling 70 yards past scrimmage before hitting the ground. It appeared to contribute to difficulties with short passes and long snaps.

=== Week 3: at New York Giants ===
Quarter	1	2	3	4	OT	Total
Bengals	3	10	0	10	0	23
Giants	0	10	3	10	3	26

at Giants Stadium, East Rutherford, New Jersey

- Game time: 1:00 pm EST
- Game weather: 76 °F (24 °C) (Sunny)
- Game attendance: 79,276
- Referee: Jeff Triplette
- TV announcers (CBS): Greg Gumbel & Dan Dierdorf

Starters Ben Utecht, Johnathan Joseph, & Dexter Jackson, were inactive for the game due to injuries.

Trying to snap their two-game losing skid, the Bengals flew to Giants Stadium for a Week 3 matchup with the defending Super Bowl champions, the New York Giants. In the first quarter, Cincinnati scratched first with kicker Shayne Graham getting a 22-yard field goal. In the second quarter, the Giants responded with RB Brandon Jacobs getting a 1-yard TD run. The Bengals would strike back with RB Chris Perry getting a 25-yard TD run. New York tied the game with kicker John Carney getting a 24-yard field goal, yet Cincinnati would close out the half with Graham's 30-yard field goal.

In the third quarter, the Giants would tie the game with Carney kicking a 46-yard field goal. In the fourth quarter, New York would take the lead with Carney's 26-yard field goal. The Bengals would reclaim its lead with QB Carson Palmer completing a 17-yard TD pass to WR T.J. Houshmandzadeh. The Giants responded with QB Eli Manning completing a 4-yard TD pass to TE Kevin Boss, yet Cincinnati tied the game with Graham's 21-yard field goal. However, in overtime, New York came out on top as Carney nailing the game-winning 22-yard field goal.

With the loss, the Bengals fell to 0–3 as they prepared to face the Cleveland Browns the next game who were also 0–3. This was the team's first 0-3 start since 2003.

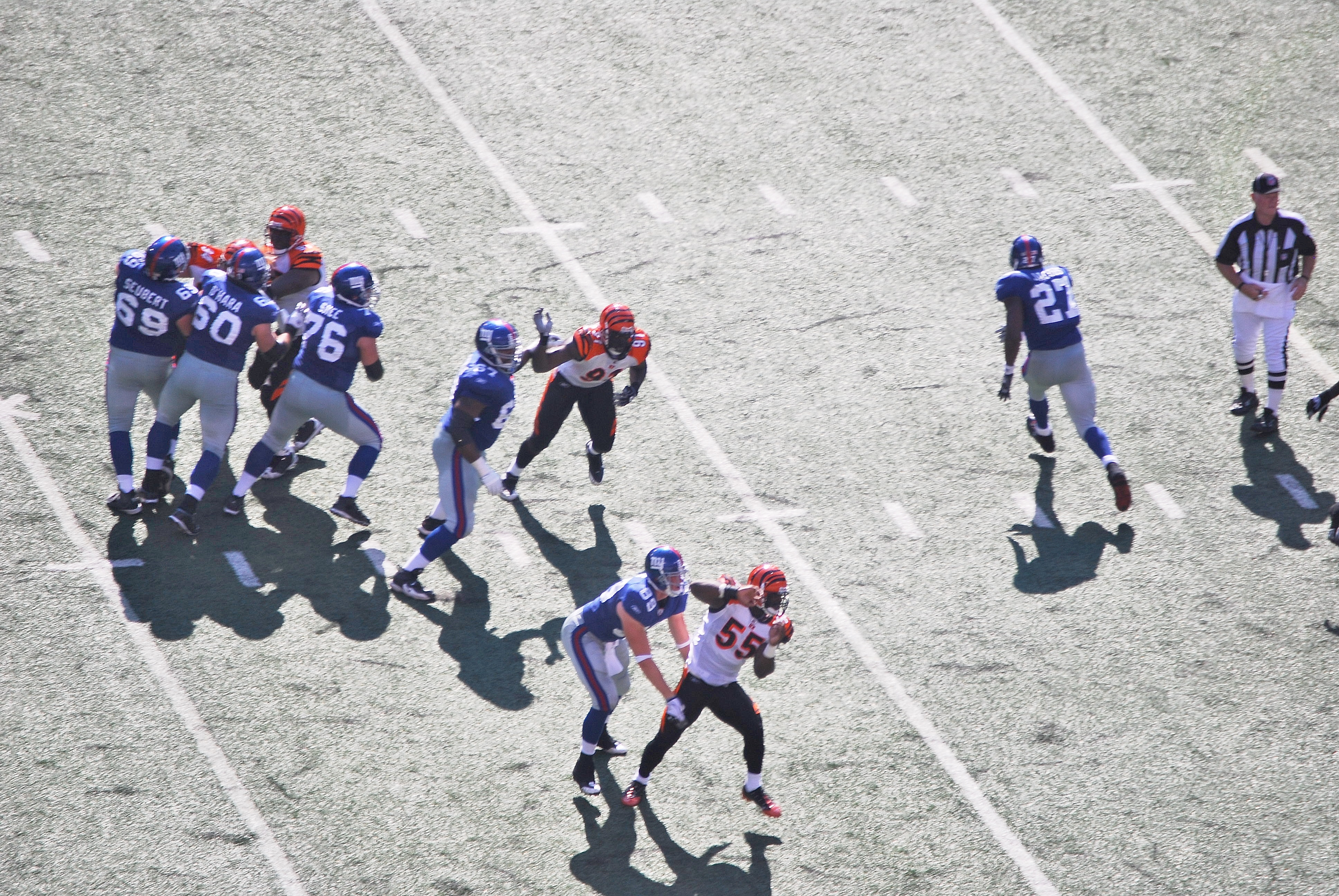
Cincinnati on defense in week 3

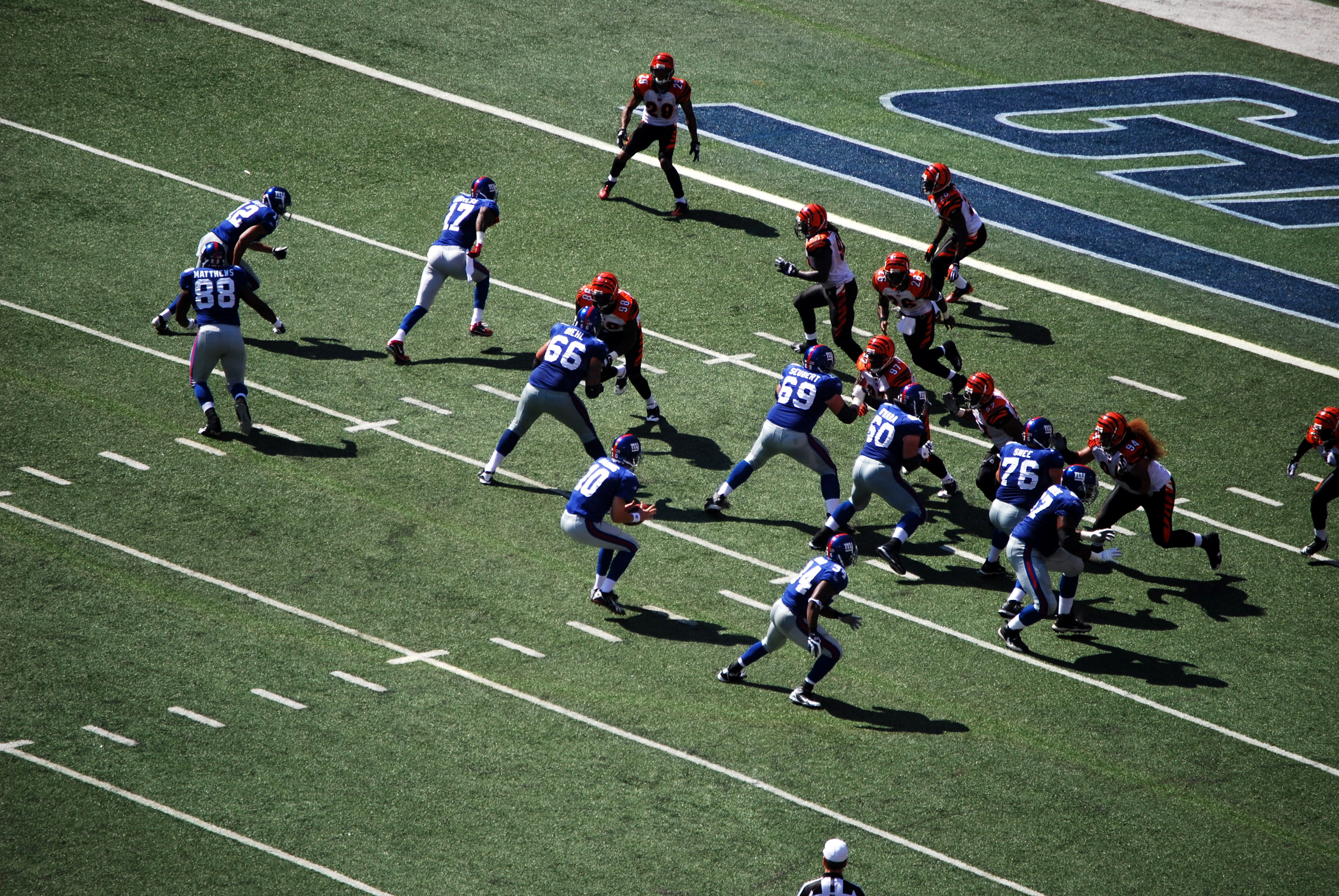
Eli Manning in the shotgun

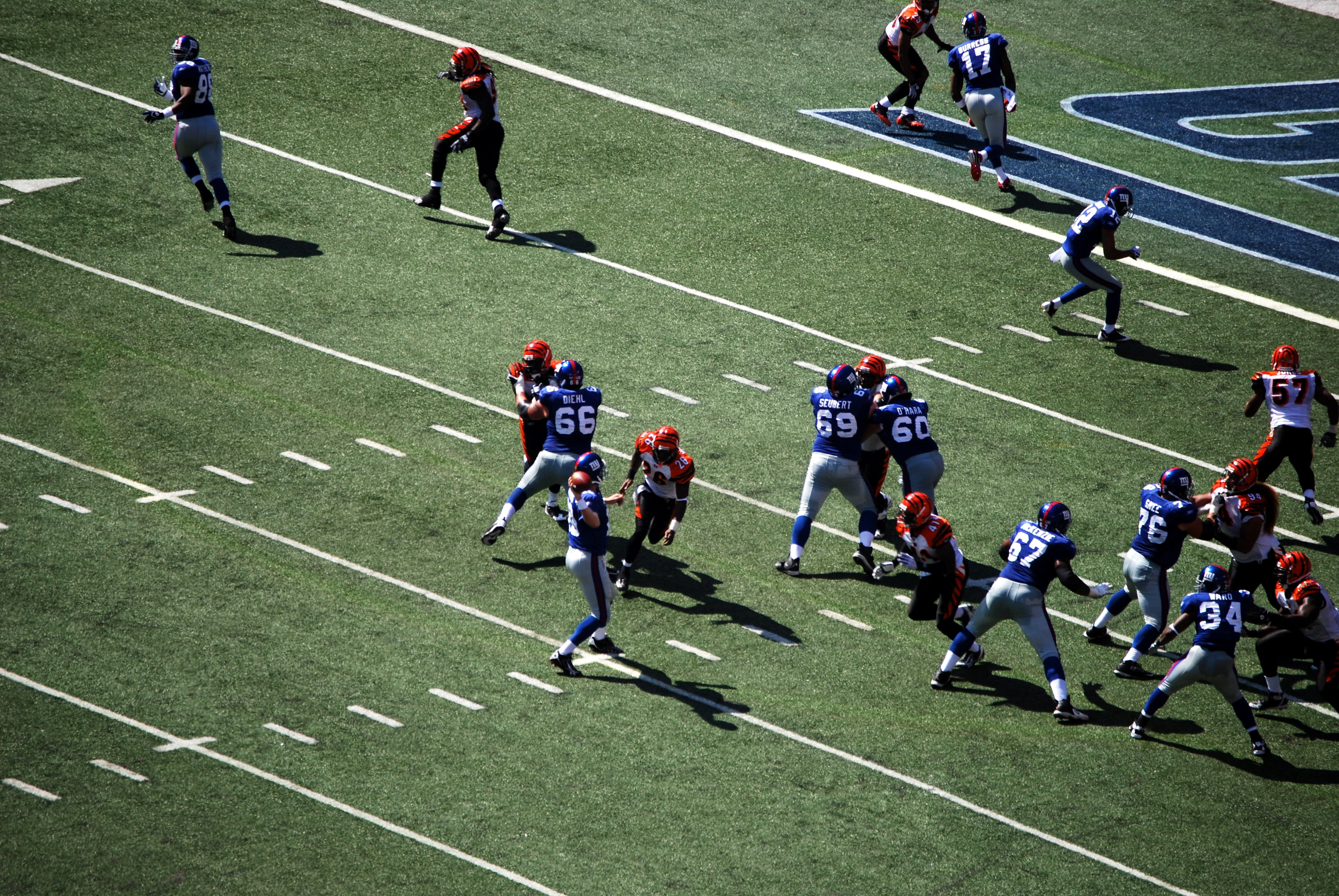
Manning passing against Cincinnati

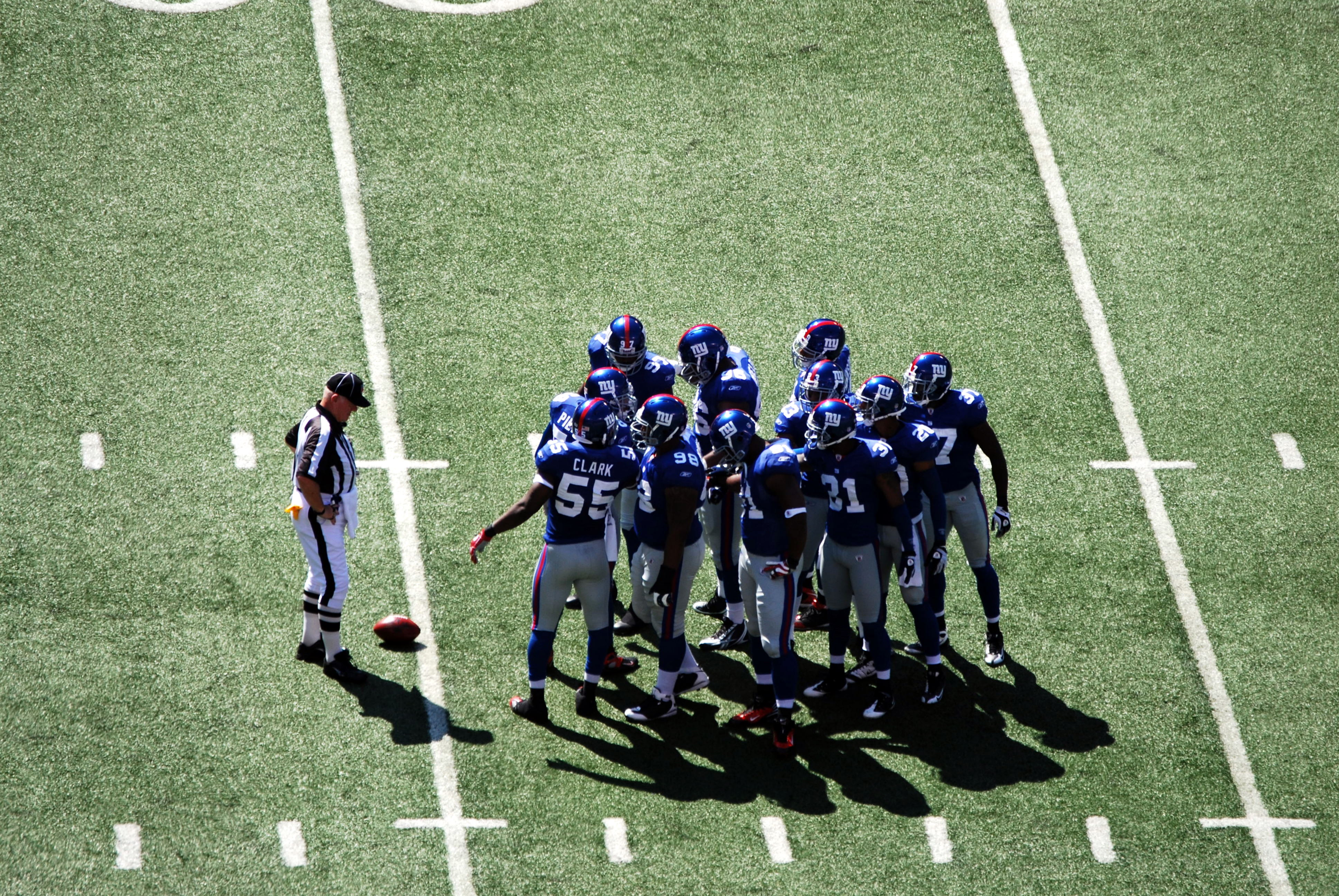
New York huddle against Cincinnati

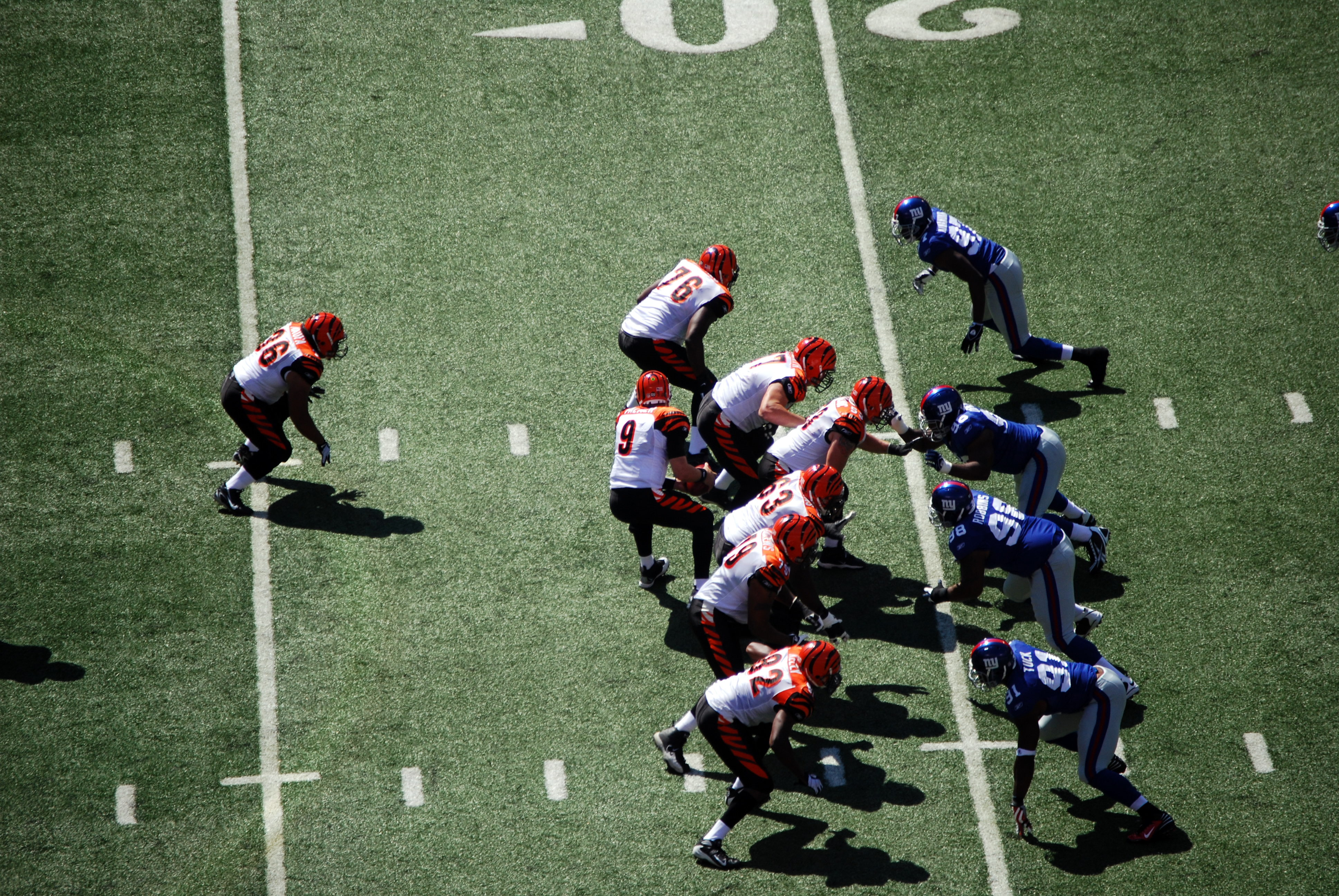
The Bengals on offense at New York

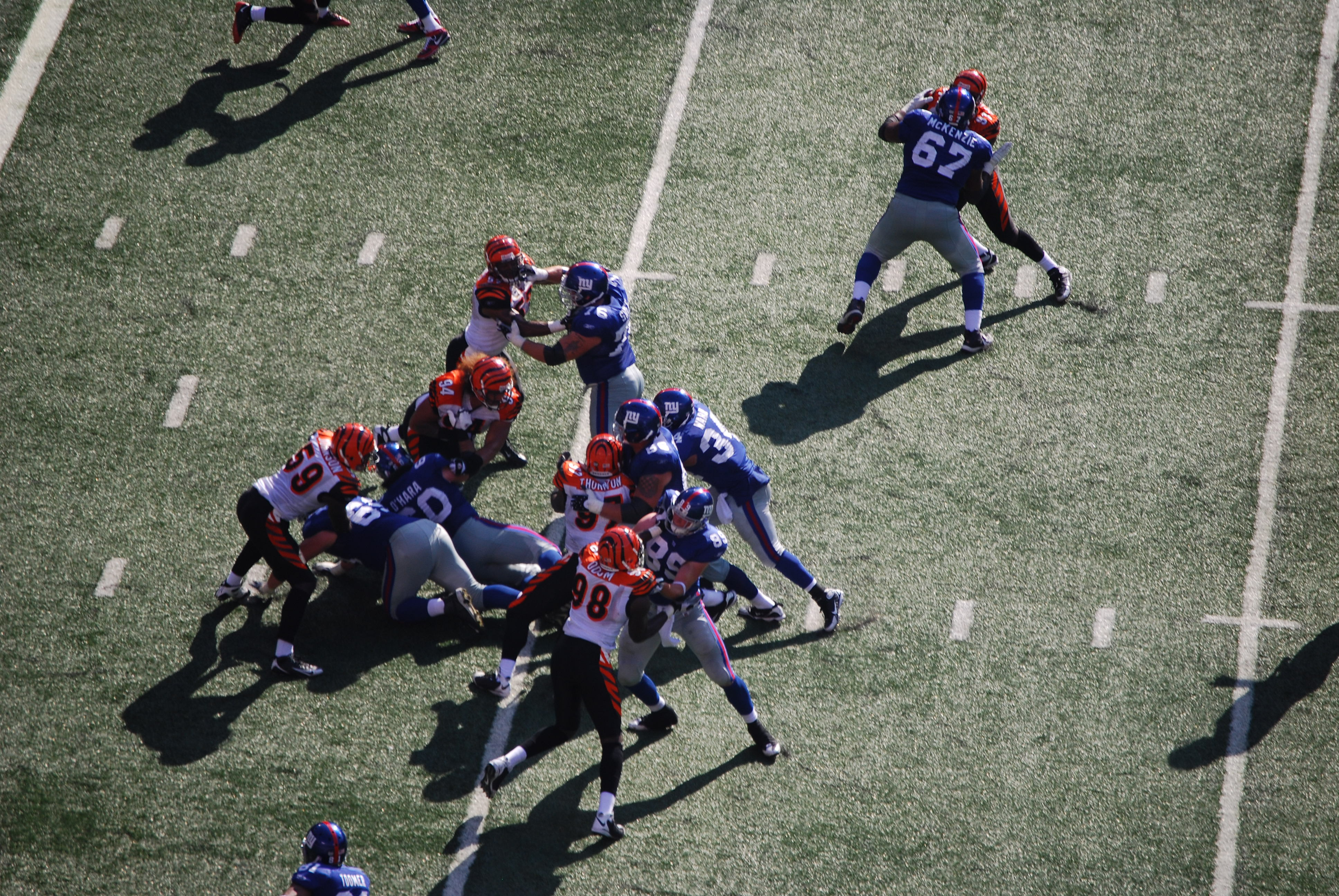
The Giants offensive line

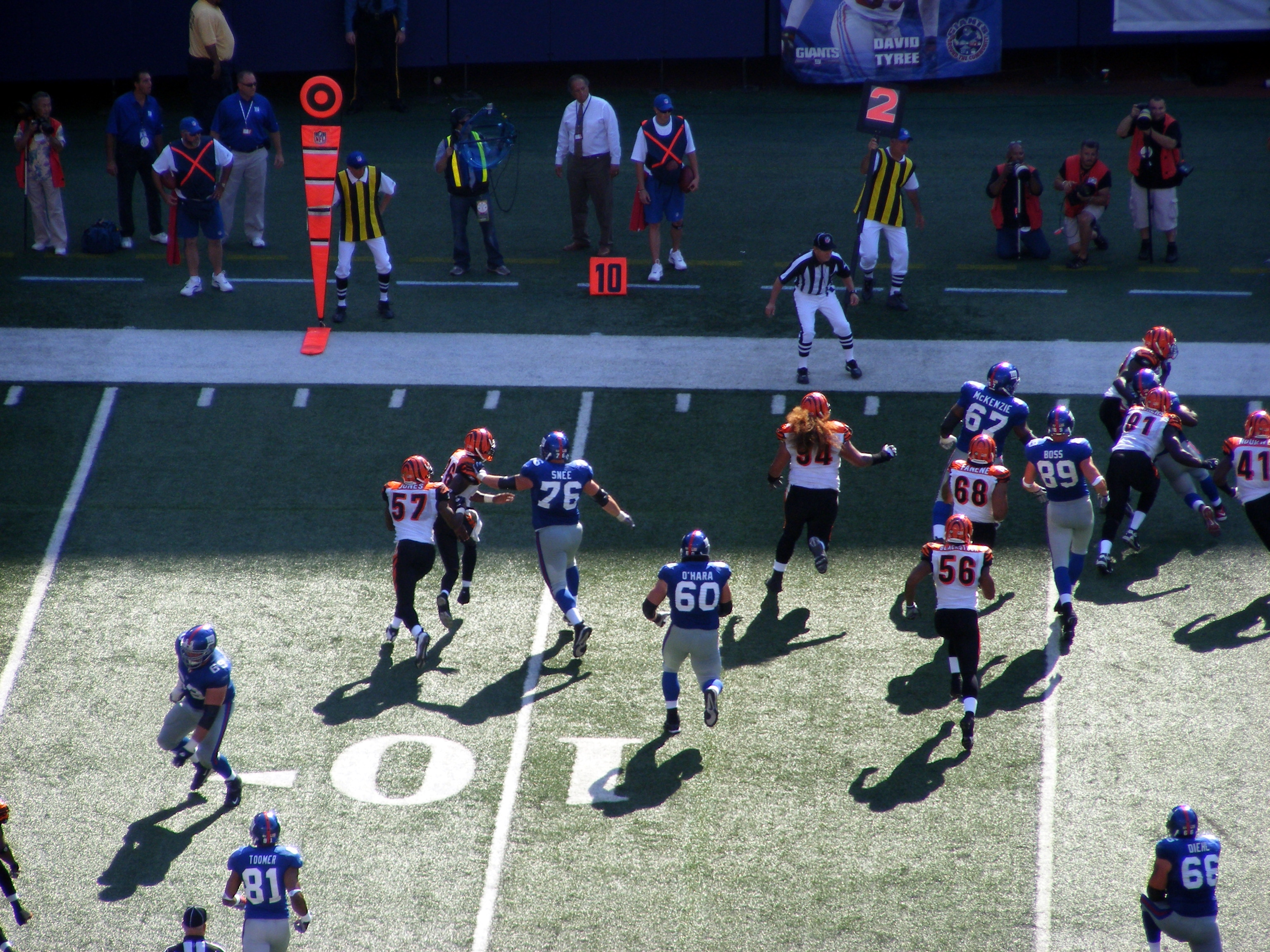
A New York 2nd down play

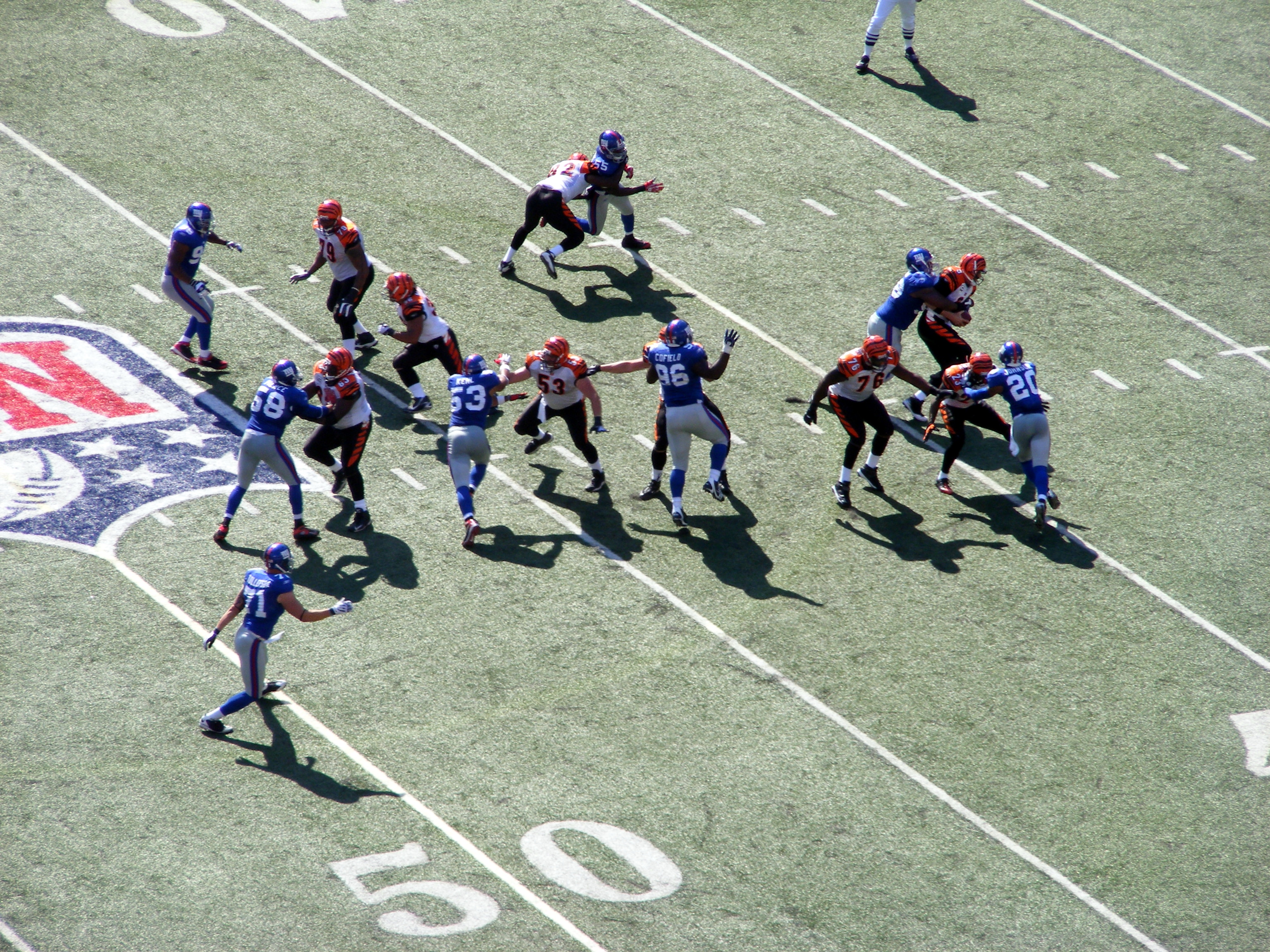
Carson Palmer is sacked

=== Week 4: vs. Cleveland Browns ===
Quarter	1	2	3	4	Total
Browns	3	0	0	17	20
Bengals	0	6	0	6	12

at Paul Brown Stadium, Cincinnati, Ohio

- Game time: 1:00 pm EDT
- Game weather: 74 °F (23 °C) (Mostly Sunny)
- Game attendance: 65,541
- Referee: Jerome Boger
- TV announcers (CBS): Kevin Harlan & Rich Gannon

Still searching for their first win, the Bengals went home for a Week 4 AFC North duel with the Cleveland Browns in Round 1 of 2008's Battle of Ohio. With QB Carson Palmer out with a sore right elbow, back-up QB Ryan Fitzpatrick was named the starter.

In the first quarter, Cincinnati trailed early as Browns kicker Phil Dawson got a 25-yard field goal. In the second quarter, the Bengals took the lead with kicker Shayne Graham getting a 42-yard and a 45-yard field goal. After a scoreless third quarter, Cleveland regained the lead in the fourth quarter with QB Derek Anderson completing a 4-yard TD pass to WR Braylon Edwards, along with RB Jamal Lewis getting a 1-yard TD run. Cincinnati would respond with Fitzpatrick completing a 4-yard TD pass to WR Chad Ocho Cinco, yet the Browns pulled away with Dawson nailing a 29-yard field goal.

With yet another loss, the Bengals fell to 0–4 for the first time since 2002, while the Browns improved to 1–3.

=== Week 5: at Dallas Cowboys ===
Quarter	1	2	3	4	Total
Bengals	0	6	7	9	22
Cowboys	10	7	0	14	31

at Texas Stadium, Irving, Texas

- Game time: 4:15 pm EDT
- Game weather: 87 °F (31 °C) (Sunny)
- Game attendance: 62,655
- Referee: Bill Leavy
- TV announcers (CBS): Jim Nantz & Phil Simms

Still searching for their first win, the Bengals flew to Texas Stadium for a Week 5 interconference duel with the Dallas Cowboys. In the first quarter, Cincinnati trailed early as Cowboys kicker Nick Folk got a 30-yard field goal, along with RB Felix Jones getting a 33-yard TD run. In the second quarter, Dallas increased its lead as QB Tony Romo completed a 4-yard TD pass to TE Jason Witten. The Bengals would end the half with kicker Shayne Graham getting a 41-yard and a 31-yard field goal.

In the third quarter, Cincinnati tried to rally as QB Carson Palmer completed an 18-yard TD pass to WR T. J. Houshmandzadeh. In the fourth quarter, the Bengals got closer as Graham got a 40-yard field goal, yet the Cowboys answered with Romo completing a 57-yard TD pass to WR Terrell Owens. Cincinnati tried to come back as Palmer completed a 10-yard TD pass to Houshmandzadeh (with a failed 2-point conversion), but Dallas pulled away with Romo completing a 15-yard TD pass to WR Patrick Crayton.

With the loss, the Bengals fell to 0–5.

=== Week 6: at New York Jets ===
Quarter	1	2	3	4	Total
Bengals	7	7	0	0	14
Jets	7	10	3	6	26

at The Meadowlands, East Rutherford, New Jersey

- Game time: 1:00 pm EST
- Game weather: 67 °F (19 °C) (Clear)
- Game attendance: 78,161
- Referee: Gene Steratore
- TV announcers (CBS): Dick Enberg, Randy Cross & Dan Fouts

Still looking for their first win, the Bengals flew to The Meadowlands for a Week 6 duel with the throwback-clad New York Jets. With QB Carson Palmer out again nursing an injured elbow, QB Ryan Fitzpatrick was again named the starter.

In the first quarter, Cincinnati pounced first as strong safety Chinedum Ndukwe returned a fumble 15 yards for a touchdown. The Jets responded with QB Brett Favre completing a 2-yard TD pass to RB Thomas Jones. In the second quarter, New York took the lead as kicker Jay Feely got a 38-yard field goal, while Jones got a 7-yard TD run. The Bengals closed out the half with Fitzpatrick getting a 1-yard TD run.

In the third quarter, the Jets began to pull away as Feely got a 43-yard field goal. In the fourth quarter, New York sealed the win as Jones got a 1-yard TD run (with a failed 2-point conversion).

With the loss, Cincinnati fell to 0–6 and it became their first 0–6 start as well as 6-game losing streak since 2002.

=== Week 7: vs. Pittsburgh Steelers ===
Quarter	1	2	3	4	Total
Steelers	10	0	7	21	38
Bengals	0	7	3	0	10

at Paul Brown Stadium, Cincinnati, Ohio

- Game time: 1:00 pm EST
- Game weather: 56 °F (13 °C)
- Game attendance: 65,860
- Referee: Ed Hochuli
- TV announcers (CBS): Kevin Harlan & Rich Gannon

Still searching for their first win of the season, the Bengals went home for a Week 7 AFC North duel with the Pittsburgh Steelers. With Carson Palmer still out with a sore elbow, QB Ryan Fitzpatrick was given the start.

In the first quarter, Cincinnati trailed early as Steelers QB Ben Roethlisberger completed a 2-yard TD pass to RB Mewelde Moore, along with kicker Jeff Reed getting a 21-yard field goal. In the second quarter, the Bengals answered with Fitzpatrick completing a 5-yard TD pass to WR Chad Ocho Cinco. In the third quarter, Pittsburgh responded with Moore getting a 13-yard TD run. Cincinnati would respond with kicker Dave Rayner nailing a 26-yard field goal. However, in the fourth quarter, the Steelers pulled away with Roethlisberger completing a 50-yard TD pass to WR Nate Washington, Moore getting a 2-yard TD run, and QB Byron Leftwich completing a 16-yard TD pass to WR Hines Ward. Earlier in the game, Ward destroyed Bengals linebacker Keith Rivers with a vicious then-legal hit, breaking Rivers' jaw. NFL rules were changed after the season to make similar hits illegal in the future.

With the loss, Cincinnati dropped to 0–7. The team's first such start since 2002.

=== Week 8: at Houston Texans ===
Quarter	1	2	3	4	Total
Bengals	3	3	0	0	6
Texans	7	7	14	7	35

at Reliant Stadium, Houston, Texas

- Game time: 4:05 pm EST
- Game weather: 82 °F (28 °C) (Clear)
- Game attendance: 70,112
- Referee: Ron Winter
- TV announcers (CBS): Gus Johnson & Steve Tasker

Still trying to acquire their first win of the season, the Bengals flew to Reliant Stadium for a Week 8 duel with the Houston Texans. In the first quarter, Cincinnati's struggles continued as Texans WR Jacoby Jones returned a punt 73 yards for a touchdown. The Bengals responded with kicker Shayne Graham getting a 43-yard field goal. In the second quarter, Houston increased its lead as QB Matt Schaub completed a 6-yard TD pass to WR David Anderson. Cincinnati closed out the half with Graham nailing a 32-yard field goal.

In the third quarter, the Texans began to pull away as Schaub completed a 7-yard and a 39-yard TD pass to WR Kevin Walter. In the fourth quarter, Houston sealed the win with RB Steve Slaton getting a 20-yard TD run.

With yet another loss, the Bengals would fall to 0–8 and start a season with such a record for the first time since 1994.

=== Week 9: vs. Jacksonville Jaguars ===
Quarter	1	2	3	4	Total
Jaguars	0	3	0	16	19
Bengals	7	7	7	0	21

at Paul Brown Stadium, Cincinnati, Ohio

- Game time: 1:00 pm EST
- Game weather: 66 °F (19 °C) (Sunny)
- Game attendance: 64,238
- Referee: Terry McAulay
- TV announcers (CBS): Gus Johnson & Steve Tasker

Still looking for their first win of the season, the Bengals went home, donned their alternate uniforms, and played a Week 9 duel with the Jacksonville Jaguars. In the first quarter, Cincinnati clawed first as QB Ryan Fitzpatrick completed a 2-yard TD pass to WR Chad Ocho Cinco. In the second quarter, the Bengals increased their lead as Fitzpatrick hooked up with Ocho Cinco again on a 10-yard TD pass. The Jaguars would end the half on kicker Josh Scobee's 52-yard field goal.

In the third quarter, Cincinnati continued its hot streak as RB Cedric Benson got a 7-yard TD run. In the fourth quarter, Jacksonville began to rally as Scobee nailed a 26-yard field goal, FB Montell Owens returned the fumbled kickoff 18 yards for a touchdown, and RB Maurice Jones-Drew got a 1-yard TD pass. Fortunately, the Bengals' defense prevented the Jaguars from getting the 2-point conversion, allowing Cincinnati to finally get its first win of the season.

With the win, not only did the Bengals go into their bye week at 1–8, the win also made the Lions the only winless NFL team (the same Lions that would go 0–16).

=== Week 11: vs. Philadelphia Eagles ===
Quarter	1	2	3	4	OT	Total
Eagles	0	3	7	3	0	13
Bengals	0	10	3	0	0	13

at Paul Brown Stadium, Cincinnati, Ohio

- Game time: 1:00 pm EST
- Game weather: 38 °F (3 °C) (cloudy)
- Game attendance: 64,633
- Referee: Tony Corrente
- TV announcers (Fox): Kenny Albert, Daryl Johnston, and Tony Siragusa

Coming off their bye week, the Bengals stayed at home for a Week 11 interconference duel with the Philadelphia Eagles. After a scoreless first quarter, Cincinnati pounced as kicker Shayne Graham got a 20-yard field goal. The Eagles responded as kicker David Akers got a 42-yard field goal. The Bengals would close out the half as QB Ryan Fitzpatrick completed a 26-yard TD pass to WR T.J. Houshmandzadeh.

In the third quarter, Cincinnati increased their lead as Graham got a 41-yard field goal. Philadelphia answered with QB Donovan McNabb completing a 4-yard TD pass to TE L.J. Smith. In the fourth quarter, the Eagles tied the game with Aker nailing a 27-yard field goal. In overtime, both teams had opportunities for game-winning scores, yet both defenses kept them down.

With the tie, the Bengals improved to 1–8–1.

This was the first game to end in a tie in the NFL since 2002, when the Atlanta Falcons played the Pittsburgh Steelers to a 34–34 tie. At the post-game press conference, Eagles quarterback Donovan McNabb famously stated that he didn't know games could end tied. A minor controversy arose from this, claiming that the Eagles could have changed their overtime strategy had McNabb known about ties. This marked Cincinnati's last tie until 2016 and their last tie against the Eagles until 2020.

=== Week 12: at Pittsburgh Steelers ===
Quarter	1	2	3	4	Total
Bengals	7	0	0	3	10
Steelers	0	10	10	7	27

at Heinz Field, Pittsburgh, Pennsylvania

- Game time: 8:15 pm EDT
- Game weather: 32 °F (0 °C) (Cloudy & Snowy)
- Game attendance: 59,854
- Referee: Ron Winter
- TV announcers (NFLN): Bob Papa & Cris Collinsworth

Coming off their tie with the Eagles, the Bengals flew to Heinz Field for a Week 12 AFC North rematch with the Pittsburgh Steelers on Thursday Night Football. Prior to the game, it was announced that due to arriving at a team meeting 45 minutes late and arguing with head coach Marvin Lewis, WR Chad Ocho Cinco was deactivated for the game.

In the first quarter, Cincinnati struck first as QB Ryan Fitzpatrick completed a 10-yard TD pass to WR Glenn Holt. In the second quarter, the Steelers took the lead as QB Ben Roethlisberger completed a 3-yard TD pass to TE Heath Miller, along with kicker Jeff Reed getting a 37-yard field goal. In the third quarter, Pittsburgh increased its lead as Reed made a 38-yard field goal, along with RB Gary Russell getting a 2-yard TD run. In the fourth quarter, the Bengals tried to rally as kicker Shayne Graham nailed a 26-yard field goal. However, the Steelers pulled away with Roethlisberger's 8-yard TD run.

With the loss, Cincinnati fell to 1–9–1. It was also the Bengals' 332nd loss since the originating of the AFC-NFC format in 1970, temporarily tying them with the New York Jets for the most all-time losses among AFC teams.

=== Week 13: vs. Baltimore Ravens ===
Quarter	1	2	3	4	Total
Ravens	3	10	14	7	34
Bengals	0	3	0	0	3

at Paul Brown Stadium, Cincinnati, Ohio

- Game time: 1:00 pm EST
- Game weather: 42 °F (6 °C) (Cloudy with Showers)
- Game attendance: 63,871
- Referee: Carl Cheffers
- TV announcers (CBS): Ian Eagle & Solomon Wilcots

Hoping to rebound from their road loss to the Steelers, the Bengals went home for a Week 13 AFC North rematch with the Baltimore Ravens. In the first quarter, Cincinnati trailed early as Ravens kicker Matt Stover made a 27-yard field goal. In the second quarter, Baltimore increased its lead as Stover got a 21-yard field goal, along with QB Joe Flacco completing a 4-yard TD pass to TE Todd Heap. The Bengals would close out the half as kicker Shayne Graham nailed a 21-yard field goal.

In the third quarter, the Ravens pulled away as WR Mark Clayton completed a 32-yard TD pass to WR Derrick Mason and caught a 70-yard TD pass from Flacco. In the fourth quarter, Baltimore pulled away as safety Jim Leonhard returned an interception 35 yards for a touchdown.

With the loss, not only did Cincinnati fall to 1–10–1, they had surpassed their 2007 loss total and were swept by the Ravens for the first time since 2002. The Bengals also ended up being eliminated from playoff contention for the third consecutive season.

=== Week 14: at Indianapolis Colts ===
Quarter	1	2	3	4	Total
Bengals	0	3	0	0	3
Colts	7	7	14	7	35

at Lucas Oil Stadium, Indianapolis, Indiana

- Game time: 1:00 pm EST
- Game weather: Dome
- Game attendance: 66,402
- Referee: Jeff Triplette
- TV announcers (CBS): Ian Eagle (play-by-play) and Solomon Wilcots (color commentator)

Trying to rebound from back-to-back divisional losses, the Bengals flew to Lucas Oil Stadium for a Week 14 duel with the Indianapolis Colts. In the first quarter, Cincinnati trailed as Colts RB Dominic Rhodes got a 17-yard TD run. The Bengals would answer in the second quarter as kicker Shayne Graham nailed a 19-yard field goal, but Indianapolis answered right back with QB Peyton Manning completing a 5-yard touchdown pass to wide receiver Marvin Harrison. Manning would help the Colts pull away in the third quarter with a 2-yard touchdown pass to wide receiver Anthony Gonzalez and a 4-yard touchdown pass to TE Dallas Clark. Indianapolis would seal the game in the fourth quarter as CB Kelvin Hayden returned an interception 85 yards for a touchdown.

With the loss, Cincinnati fell to 1–11–1.

=== Week 15 vs. Redskins ===
Washington Redskins (7–6) at Cincinnati Bengals (1–11–1)

Quarter	1	2	3	4	Total
Redskins	0	10	0	3	13
Bengals	14	3	0	3	20

at Paul Brown Stadium • Cincinnati, Ohio

- Date: December 14
- Game time: 12:00 pm. CDT
- Game weather: Cloudy • 49 °F (9 °C) • Wind 15 mph (24 km/h) SSW
- Game attendance: 63,996
- Referee: Bill Leavy
- TV announcers (Fox): Kenny Albert, Daryl Johnston, and Tony Siragusa
- Game Book

Game information

Redskins

- Jason Campbell
  17/28, 167 Yds, TD
- Clinton Portis
  25 Rush, 77 Yds
- Santana Moss
  7 Rec, 72 Yds, TD

Bengals

- Ryan Fitzpatrick
  16/29, 209 Yds, TD
- Cedric Benson
  21 Rush, 73 Yds
  3 Rec, 88 Yds

Scoring summary

Quarter	Time	Drive			Team	Scoring information	Score	
Quarter	Time	Plays	Yards	TOP	Team	Scoring information	WSH	CIN
1	10:30	6	41	3:38	Bengals	Fitzpatrick 1-yard touchdown run, Graham kick good	0	7
1	3:10	6	94	3:08	Bengals	Henry 12-yard touchdown reception from Fitzpatrick, Graham kick good	0	14
2	11:19	9	44	4:06	Bengals	32-yard field goal by Graham	0	17
2	4:44	8	40	4:03	Redskins	Moss 10-yard touchdown reception from Campbell, Suisham kick good	7	17
2	0:15	12	71	3:27	Redskins	23-yard field goal by Suisham	10	17
4	2:20	16	41	7:13	Bengals	45-yard field goal by Graham	10	20
4	1:43	4	–5	0:37	Redskins	36-yard field goal by Suisham	13	20
"TOP" = time of possession. For other American football terms, see Glossary of American football.							13	20

=== Week 16: at Cleveland Browns ===
Quarter	1	2	3	4	Total
Bengals	7	7	0	0	14
Browns	0	0	0	0	0

at Cleveland Browns Stadium, Cleveland, Ohio

- Game time: 1:00 pm EST
- Game weather: 19 °F (−7 °C) (Wind Chill: 0 °F (−18 °C))
- Game attendance: 72,361
- Referee: Mike Carey
- TV announcers (CBS): Kevin Harlan & Rich Gannon

Coming off their home win over the Redskins, the Bengals flew to Cleveland Browns Stadium for Round 2 of 2008's Battle of Ohio with the Cleveland Browns. Cincinnati would get the lead in the first quarter as cornerback Leon Hall returned an interception 50 yards for a touchdown which was his first interception of the year. Hall also intercepted two other passes giving him 3 total in the game. RB Cedric Benson carried the ball for a career-high 38 times for a career-high 171 yards. The Bengals would then add onto their lead in the second quarter as quarterback Ryan Fitzpatrick completed a 20-yard touchdown pass to wide receiver Chris Henry. From there on out, the defense prevented Cleveland from getting any kind of momentum.

With the win, the Bengals improved to 3–11–1.

=== Week 17: vs. Kansas City Chiefs ===
Quarter	1	2	3	4	Total
Chiefs	0	0	0	6	6
Bengals	3	10	0	3	16

at Paul Brown Stadium, Cincinnati, Ohio

- Game time: 1:00 pm EST
- Game weather: 43 °F (6 °C) (Sunny)
- Game attendance: 63,984
- Referee: Bill Carollo
- TV announcers (CBS): Bill Macatee & Steve Beuerlein

Coming off their divisional road win over the Browns, the Bengals went home, donned their alternate uniforms again, and closed out their season with a Week 17 duel with the Kansas City Chiefs. Cincinnati would get the first punch in the first quarter as kicker Shayne Graham got a 38-yard field goal. In the second quarter, the Bengals would increase their lead as running back Cedric Benson got a 2-yard touchdown run, followed by Graham's 30-yard field goal. After a scoreless third quarter, Cincinnati wrapped up its dominating day with Graham's 43-yard field goal. The Chiefs would respond with quarterback Tyler Thigpen completing a 5-yard touchdown pass to tight end Tony Gonzalez (with a failed 2-point conversion).
