= 2008 Cleveland Browns season =

60th season in franchise history

- Owner: Randy Lerner
- General manager: Phil Savage
- Head coach: Romeo Crennel
- Home stadium: Cleveland Browns Stadium

Results
- Record: 4–12
- Division place: 4th AFC North
- Playoffs: Did not qualify
- Pro Bowlers: LS Ryan Pontbriand; DT Shaun Rogers; LT Joe Thomas

Uniform

The 2008 Cleveland Browns season was the team's 60th season as a professional sports franchise and its 56th season as a member of the National Football League (NFL). The Browns finished with a 4–12 record and failed to qualify for the playoffs. The season marked Romeo Crennel's fourth (and what would be final) year as head coach of the Browns. Cleveland played all of their home games at Cleveland Browns Stadium in Cleveland, Ohio. To end the 2008 season, the Browns failed to score an offensive touchdown for 24 consecutive quarters and were shut out in their final two games, the last time a team would be shut out in back-to-back games until the Carolina Panthers were shut out in their final two games 15 years later. The Cleveland Browns failed to make the playoffs for the sixth consecutive season.

== Offseason ==
=== Coaching staff changes ===
On January 7, the Browns signed offensive coordinator Rob Chudzinski to a two-year contract extension, effectively allowing the coach to remain in Cleveland through the 2011 season. Chudzinski declined an opportunity to interview for the vacant head coach position of the Baltimore Ravens to remain in Cleveland.

On January 11, it was announced by Crennel that the team had fired defensive coordinator Todd Grantham, and that a replacement would be announced soon. Grantham's firing comes just months after signing a two-year contract extension. The next day, it was announced that Mel Tucker, defensive backs coach for the Browns, was given the job. After spending three years on the Browns defensive coaching staff, Cory Undlin was promoted to defensive backs coach to replace Tucker.

On January 29, the team announced that it had re-signed head coach Romeo Crennel to a two-year contract extension. General manager Phil Savage stated that Crennel did not ask for an extension, but rather that the team felt that it was the proper thing to do for the head coach.

=== Free agents ===
Pos.	Player	Tag	Signed	Team	Contract
LB	Keith Adams	UFA			
FB	Charles Ali	ERFA	March 13	Browns	1 year
QB	Derek Anderson	RFA	February 29	Browns	3 years
DB	Gary Baxter	UFA	March 13	Browns	1 year
WR	Tim Carter	UFA	May 22	Texans	1 year
DB	Ricardo Colclough	UFA	March 1	Panthers	2 years
OL	Nat Dorsey	UFA			
DL	Simon Fraser	RFA	March 7	Falcons	
OL	Lennie Friedman	UFA	March 12	Browns	1 year
LB	Kris Griffin	RFA	March 26	Browns	1 year
DE	Bobby Hamilton	UFA			
CB	Daven Holly	RFA	February 28	Browns	Second-round tender
DE	Justin Hunt	UFA			
DT	Ethan Kelley	UFA			
RB	Jamal Lewis	UFA	February 21	Browns	3 years
G	Seth McKinney	UFA	March 28	Browns	1 year
DL	Alvin Smith	ERFA			
LB	Matt Stewart	UFA	April 18	Cardinals	1 year
LB	Chaun Thompson	UFA	March 14	Texans	2 years
NT	Ted Washington	UFA			
UFA: Unrestricted free agent; RFA: Restricted free agent; ERFA: Exclusive rights free agent

=== Signings ===
Pos.	Player	Signed	Contract	Acquired
CB	Terry Cousin	May 23	2 years	free agent
C	Rex Hadnot	March 10	2 years	free agent
LB	Shantee Orr	March 21	1 year	free agent
DE	Shaun Rogers	March 1	6 years	trade with Lions
WR	Donté Stallworth	March 1	7 years	free agent
DE	Corey Williams	February 29	6 years	trade with Packers

=== Releases ===
Pos.	Player	Tag	Signed	Team	Contract
S	Gary Baxter	UFA			
C	LeCharles Bentley	UFA			
DE	Justin Hunt	UFA			
DE	Orpheus Roye	UFA	Steelers		
CB	Kenny Wright	UFA			

=== 2008 NFL draft ===
The Browns did not have a selection in the first three rounds.

Round	Pick	Name	Position	College
4	5 (104)	Beau Bell	Linebacker	UNLV
4	11 (111)	Martin Rucker	Tight end	Missouri
6	24 (190)	Ahtyba Rubin	Defensive tackle	Iowa State
6	25 (191)	Paul Hubbard	Wide receiver	Wisconsin
7	25 (231)	Alex Hall	Defensive end	St. Augustine's

== Coaching staff ==
Cleveland Browns 2008 coaching staff
Head coaches: Head coach – Romeo Crennel; Assistant head coach/quarterbacks – Rip Scherer; Offensive coaches: Offensive coordinator – Rob Chudzinski; Running backs – Anthony Lynn; Wide receivers – Wes Chandler; Tight ends – Alfredo Roberts; Offensive line – Steve Marshall; Offensive line – Mike Sullivan; Senior offensive assistant – Dave Atkins; Offensive assistant – Frank Verducci	Defensive coaches: Defensive coordinator – Mel Tucker; Defensive line – Randy Melvin; Linebackers – Mike Haluchak; Defensive backs – Cory Undlin; Assistant defensive backs – Richard McNutt; Defensive assistant – Bob Trott; Defensive quality control – Umberto Leone; Special teams coaches: Special teams coordinator – Ted Daisher; Assistant special teams/head coach liaison – Chris Caminiti; Strength and conditioning: Head strength and conditioning – Tom Mylinski; Assistant strength and conditioning – Alan DeGennaro

== Final roster ==
2008 Cleveland Browns roster
Quarterbacks (QB): 13 Richard Bartel; 7 Bruce Gradkowski; Running backs (RB): 41 Charles Ali FB; 35 Jerome Harrison; 31 Jamal Lewis; 28 Allen Patrick; 47 Lawrence Vickers FB; Wide receivers (WR): 16 Josh Cribbs KR/PR; 17 Braylon Edwards; 89 Paul Hubbard; 18 Donté Stallworth; 12 Syndric Steptoe; Tight ends (TE): 88 Brad Cieslak; 87 Darnell Dinkins; 85 John Madsen; 86 Martin Rucker; 80 Kellen Winslow II	Offensive linemen (OL): 66 Hank Fraley C; 70 Rex Hadnot G; 68 Seth McKinney C/G; 77 Kevin Shaffer T; 61 Isaac Sowells G/T; 65 Eric Steinbach G; 73 Joe Thomas T; 79 Scott Young G; Defensive linemen (DL): 93 Louis Leonard DE; 92 Shaun Rogers NT; 71 Ahtyba Rubin NT; 91 Shaun Smith DE; 97 Santonio Thomas DE; 99 Corey Williams DE	Linebackers (LB): 59 Titus Brown ILB; 54 Andra Davis ILB; 53 Kris Griffin OLB; 96 Alex Hall OLB; 52 D'Qwell Jackson ILB; 55 Willie McGinest OLB; 51 Shantee Orr OLB; 94 Leon Williams ILB; 95 Kamerion Wimbley OLB; Defensive backs (DB): 42 Hamza Abdullah SS; 20 Mike Adams FS/SS; 25 Terry Cousin CB; 23 Travis Daniels CB; 26 Sean Jones SS; 30 Gerard Lawson CB; 22 Brandon McDonald CB; 21 Brodney Pool FS; 27 Nick Sorensen SS; 24 Eric Wright CB; Special teams (ST): 4 Phil Dawson K; 64 Ryan Pontbriand LS; 15 Dave Zastudil P	Practice squad: 44 Jed Collins FB; 8 Mike Dragosavich P; 62 Dustin Fry C; 90 David Holloway LB; 9 Lance Leggett WR; 60 Melila Purcell DE; 74 Kurt Quarterman G; 83 Steve Sanders WR; Reserve: 3 Derek Anderson QB (IR); 58 Beau Bell LB (IR); 11 Ken Dorsey QB (IR); -- Lennie Friedman C/G (IR); 82 Steve Heiden TE (IR); 39 Daven Holly CB (IR); 84 Joe Jurevicius WR (PUP); 56 Antwan Peek LB (IR); -- Chase Pittman DE (IR); 10 Brady Quinn QB (IR); 98 Robaire Smith DE (IR); 72 Ryan Tucker G/T (IR); 29 Jason Wright RB (IR); 69 Eric Young G (NF-Inj.); Rookies in italics 53 active, 14 reserve, 8 practice squad

== Preseason ==
=== Schedule ===
Week	Date	Opponent	Result	Record	Venue	TV	Recap
1	August 7	New York Jets	L 20–24	0–1	Cleveland Browns Stadium	Ian Eagle, Greg Buttle, Sam Ryan/Jim Donovan, Bernie Kosar, Dave Chudowsky	Recap
2	August 18	at New York Giants	L 34–37	0–2	Giants Stadium	Mike Tirico, Ron Jaworski, Tony Kornheiser, Suzy Kolber	Recap
3	August 23	at Detroit Lions	L 6–26	0–3	Ford Field	Jim Donovan, Bernie Kosar, Dave Chudowsky/Gus Johnson, Desmond Howard, Matt Shepard, Charlie Sanders	Recap
4	August 28	Chicago Bears	L 10–16	0–4	Cleveland Browns Stadium	Dave Barnett, Erik Kramer, Lou Canellis/Jim Donovan, Bernie Kosar, Dave Chudowsky	Recap

== Regular season ==
=== Schedule ===
Week	Date	Opponent	Result	Record	Venue	Recap
1	September 7	Dallas Cowboys	**L** 10–28	0–1	Cleveland Browns Stadium	Recap
2	September 14	**Pittsburgh Steelers**	**L** 6–10	0–2	Cleveland Browns Stadium	Recap
3	September 21	at **Baltimore Ravens**	**L** 10–28	0–3	M&T Bank Stadium	Recap
4	September 28	at **Cincinnati Bengals**	**W** 20–12	1–3	Paul Brown Stadium	Recap
5	Bye					
6	October 13	New York Giants	**W** 35–14	2–3	Cleveland Browns Stadium	Recap
7	October 19	at Washington Redskins	**L** 11–14	2–4	FedEx Field	Recap
8	October 26	at Jacksonville Jaguars	**W** 23–17	3–4	Alltel Stadium	Recap
9	November 2	**Baltimore Ravens**	**L** 27–37	3–5	Cleveland Browns Stadium	Recap
10	November 6	Denver Broncos	**L** 30–34	3–6	Cleveland Browns Stadium	Recap
11	November 17	at Buffalo Bills	**W** 29–27	4–6	Ralph Wilson Stadium	Recap
12	November 23	Houston Texans	**L** 6–16	4–7	Cleveland Browns Stadium	Recap
13	November 30	Indianapolis Colts	**L** 6–10	4–8	Cleveland Browns Stadium	Recap
14	December 7	at Tennessee Titans	**L** 9–28	4–9	LP Field	Recap
15	December 15	at Philadelphia Eagles	**L** 10–30	4–10	Lincoln Financial Field	Recap
16	December 21	**Cincinnati Bengals**	**L** 0–14	4–11	Cleveland Browns Stadium	Recap
17	December 28	at **Pittsburgh Steelers**	**L** 0–31	4–12	Heinz Field	Recap

Note: Intra-divisional opponents are in bold text.

== Standings ==
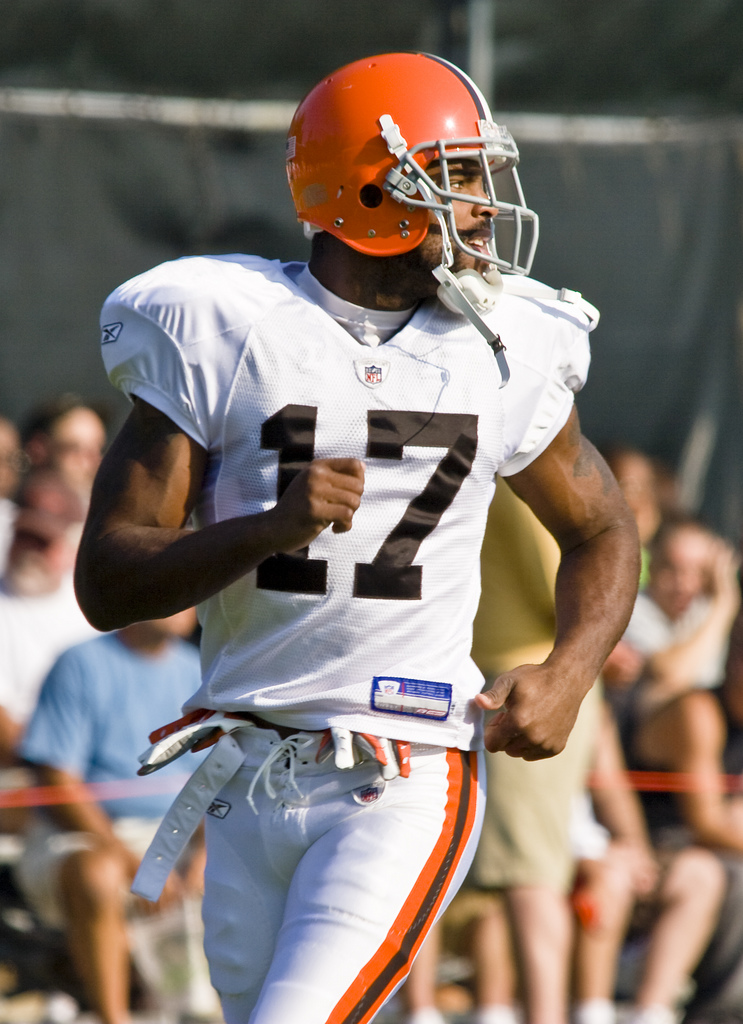
Braylon Edwards during 2008 training camp

AFC North
	W	L	T	PCT	DIV	CONF	PF	PA	STK
^{(2)} Pittsburgh Steelers	12	4	0	.750	6–0	10–2	347	223	W1
^{(6)} Baltimore Ravens	11	5	0	.688	4–2	8–4	385	244	W2
Cincinnati Bengals	4	11	1	.281	1–5	3–9	204	364	W3
Cleveland Browns	4	12	0	.250	1–5	3–9	232	350	L6

== Regular season week-by-week results ==
=== Week 1: vs. Dallas Cowboys ===
Week 1: Dallas Cowboys at Cleveland Browns – Game Summary

Quarter	1	2	3	4	Total
Cowboys	7	14	7	0	28
Browns	0	7	0	3	10

at Cleveland Browns Stadium, Cleveland, Ohio

- Game time: 4:15 PM EDT
- Game weather: 70 °F (21 °C) (Sunny)
- Game attendance: 73,012
- Referee: Bill Carollo
- TV announcers (Fox): Joe Buck, Troy Aikman, & Pam Oliver

Game information

First quarter

- DAL – Marion Barber III 1-yard run (Nick Folk kick), 6:40. Cowboys 7–0. Drive: 10 plays, 80 yards, 5:15.

Second quarter

- CLE – Kellen Winslow II 2-yard pass from Derek Anderson (Phil Dawson kick), 12:43. Tied 7–7. Drive: 16 plays, 79 yards, 8:57.
- DAL – Terrell Owens 35-yard pass from Tony Romo (Nick Folk kick), 9:48. Cowboys 14–7. Drive: 4 plays, 69 yards, 2:55.
- DAL – Marion Barber III 1-yard run (Nick Folk kick), 0:26. Cowboys 21–7. Drive: 10 plays, 53 yards, 5:39.

Third quarter

- DAL – Felix Jones 11-yard run (Nick Folk kick), 6:24. Cowboys 28–7. Drive: 10 plays, 86 yards, 4:53.

Fourth quarter

- CLE – Phil Dawson 34-yard field goal, 10:13. Cowboys 28–10. Drive: 10 plays, 92 yards, 5:25.

Top passers

- DAL – Tony Romo – 24/32, 320 yards, TD, INT
- CLE – Derek Anderson – 11/24, 114 yards, TD

Top rushers

- DAL – Marion Barber III – 16 rushes, 80 yards, 2 TD
- CLE – Jamal Lewis – 13 rushes, 62 yards

Top receivers

- DAL – Jason Witten – 6 receptions, 96 yards
- CLE – Kellen Winslow II – 5 receptions, 47 yards, TD

The Browns began their 2008 campaign at home against the defending NFC East champion Dallas Cowboys. In the first quarter, Cleveland trailed early as Cowboys RB Marion Barber got a 1-yard TD run. In the second quarter, the Browns responded with QB Derek Anderson completing a 2-yard TD pass to TE Kellen Winslow. Dallas would respond with QB Tony Romo completing a 35-yard TD pass to WR Terrell Owens, along with another 1-yard TD run from Barber. In the third quarter, Cleveland's defensive struggles continued as RB Felix Jones got an 11-yard TD run. In the fourth quarter, the Browns tried to rally, yet all they could come up with was a 34-yard field goal from kicker Phil Dawson.

With the loss, Cleveland began its season at 0–1.

=== Week 2: vs. Pittsburgh Steelers ===
Week 2: Pittsburgh Steelers at Cleveland Browns – Game Summary

Quarter	1	2	3	4	Total
Steelers	0	7	3	0	10
Browns	0	0	3	3	6

at Cleveland Browns Stadium, Cleveland, Ohio

- Game time: 8:15 PM EDT
- Game weather: 82 °F (28 °C) (Clear with High Winds)
- Game attendance: 73,048
- Referee: Tony Corrente
- TV announcers (NBC): Al Michaels, John Madden, & Andrea Kremer

Game information

First quarter

- No scoring plays

Second quarter

- PIT – Hines Ward 11-yard pass from Ben Roethlisberger (Jeff Reed kick), 6:29. Steelers 7–0. Drive: 12 plays, 77 yards, 6:29.

Third quarter

- PIT – Jeff Reed 48-yard field goal, 7:58. Steelers 10–0. Drive: 5 plays, 54 yards, 2:18.
- CLE – Phil Dawson 31-yard field goal, 1:25. Steelers 10–3. Drive: 12 plays, 57 yards, 6:33.

Fourth quarter

- CLE – Phil Dawson 38-yard field goal, 3:21. Steelers 10–6. Drive: 14 plays, 60 yards, 7:29.

Top passers

- PIT – Ben Roethlisberger – 13/20, 179 yards, TD
- CLE – Derek Anderson – 18/32, 166 yards, 2 INT

Top rushers

- PIT – Willie Parker – 28 rushes, 105 yards
- CLE – Jamal Lewis – 19 rushes, 38 yards

Top receivers

- PIT – Santonio Holmes – 5 receptions, 94 yards
- CLE – Kellen Winslow II – 7 receptions, 55 yards

Hoping to rebound from their disappointing home loss to the Cowboys, the Browns stayed at home for the first of five primetime games with a Week 2 AFC North duel against their hated rival, the Pittsburgh Steelers, in very high winds due to the remnants of Hurricane Ike. After a scoreless first quarter, Cleveland trailed as Steelers QB Ben Roethlisberger completed an 11-yard TD pass to WR Hines Ward. In the third quarter, Pittsburgh increased its lead with kicker Jeff Reed getting a 48-yard field goal. Afterwards, the Browns got on the board with kicker Phil Dawson getting a 31-yard field goal. In the fourth quarter, Cleveland tried to rally, but the only thing that came out of it was Dawson's 38-yard field goal.

With their 10th-straight loss to Pittsburgh, the Browns fell to 0–2.

This would be the Browns' last appearance on Sunday Night Football until 2019.

=== Week 3: at Baltimore Ravens ===
Week 3: Cleveland Browns at Baltimore Ravens – Game Summary

Quarter	1	2	3	4	Total
Browns	0	10	0	0	10
Ravens	0	7	21	0	28

at M&T Bank Stadium, Baltimore, Maryland

- Game time: 4:15 PM EDT
- Game weather: 77 °F (25 °C) (Sunny)
- Game attendance: 71,104
- Referee: Ed Hochuli
- TV announcers (CBS): Bill Macatee & Steve Beuerlein

Game information

First quarter

- No scoring plays

Second quarter

- CLE – Jerome Harrison 19-yard pass from Derek Anderson (Phil Dawson kick), 14:52. Browns 7–0. Drive: 7 plays, 52 yards, 3:14.
- BAL – Willis McGahee 5-yard run (Matt Stover kick), 6:40. Tied 7–7. Drive: 7 plays, 43 yards, 4:15.
- CLE – Phil Dawson 38-yard field goal, 1:04. Browns 10–7. Drive: 13 plays, 55 yards, 5:36.

Third quarter

- BAL – Le'Ron McClain 1-yard run (Matt Stover kick), 11:13. Ravens 14–10. Drive: 4 plays, 12 yards, 2:17.
- BAL – Ed Reed 32-yard interception return (Matt Stover kick), 10:23. Ravens 21–10.
- BAL – Le'Ron McClain 1-yard run (Matt Stover kick), 4:49. Ravens 28–10. Drive: 5 plays, 35 yards, 3:08.

Fourth quarter

- No scoring plays

Top passers

- CLE – Derek Anderson – 14/37, 125 yards, TD, 3 INT
- BAL – Joe Flacco – 13/19, 129 yards, 2 INT

Top rushers

- CLE – Jamal Lewis – 12 rushes, 56 yards
- BAL – Le'Ron McClain – 17 rushes, 66 yards, 2 TD

Top receivers

- CLE – Braylon Edwards – 3 receptions, 27 yards
- BAL – Derrick Mason – 4 receptions, 42 yards

Trying to snap their two-game losing streak, the Browns flew to M&T Bank Stadium for a Week 3 AFC North duel with the Baltimore Ravens. After a scoreless first quarter, Cleveland got on the board with QB Derek Anderson completing a 19-yard TD pass to RB Jerome Harrison. The Ravens would respond with RB Willis McGahee getting a yard TD run. The Browns would close out the half with kicker Phil Dawson hitting a 38-yard field goal.

In the third quarter, Baltimore took control as RB Le'Ron McClain scored on a 1-yard TD run, safety Ed Reed returned an interception 32 yards for a touchdown, and McClain getting another 1-yard TD run.

With the loss, the Browns fell to 0–3.

=== Week 4: at Cincinnati Bengals ===
Week 4: Cleveland Browns at Cincinnati Bengals – Game Summary

Quarter	1	2	3	4	Total
Browns	3	0	0	17	20
Bengals	0	6	0	6	12

at Paul Brown Stadium, Cincinnati, Ohio

- Game time: 1:00 PM EDT
- Game weather: 74 °F (23 °C) (Mostly Sunny)
- Game attendance: 65,541
- Referee: Jerome Boger
- TV announcers (CBS): Kevin Harlan & Rich Gannon

Game information

First quarter

- CLE – Phil Dawson 25-yard field goal, 9:29. Browns 3–0. Drive: 8 plays, 42 yards, 4:05.

Second quarter

- CIN – Shayne Graham 42-yard field goal, 10:22. Tied 3–3. Drive: 13 plays, 67 yards, 7:08.
- CIN – Shayne Graham 45-yard field goal, 0:08. Bengals 6–3. Drive: 9 plays, 22 yards, 2:21.

Third quarter

- No scoring plays

Fourth quarter

- CLE – Braylon Edwards 4-yard pass from Derek Anderson (Phil Dawson kick), 13:05. Browns 10–6. Drive: 13 plays, 80 yards, 6:38.
- CLE – Jamal Lewis 1-yard run (Phil Dawson kick), 11:06. Browns 17–6. Drive: 4 plays, 22 yards, 1:52.
- CIN – Chad Johnson 4-yard pass from Ryan Fitzpatrick (pass failed), 7:46. Browns 17–12. Drive: 8 plays, 59 yards, 3:20.
- CLE – Phil Dawson 29-yard field goal, 0:32. Browns 20–12. Drive: 4 plays, 7 yards, 1:32.

Top passers

- CLE – Derek Anderson – 15/24, 138 yards, TD, INT
- CIN – Ryan Fitzpatrick – 21/35, 156 yards, TD, 3 INT

Top rushers

- CLE – Jamal Lewis – 25 rushes, 79 yards, TD
- CIN – Ryan Fitzpatrick – 4 rushes, 41 yards

Top receivers

- CLE – Kellen Winslow II – 5 receptions, 54 yards
- CIN – T. J. Houshmandzadeh – 6 receptions, 50 yards

Still searching for their first win of the year, the Browns flew to Paul Brown Stadium for a Week 4 AFC North duel with the Cincinnati Bengals in Round 1 of 2008's Battle of Ohio. In the first quarter, Cleveland drew first blood as kicker Phil Dawson got a 25-yard field goal. In the second quarter, the Bengals responded with kicker Shayne Graham getting a 42-yard and a 45-yard field goal. After a scoreless third quarter, the Browns began the fourth quarter with QB Derek Anderson completing a 4-yard TD pass to WR Braylon Edwards and RB Jamal Lewis getting a 1-yard TD run. Cincinnati would answer with QB Ryan Fitzpatrick completing a 4-yard TD pass to WR Chad Ochocinco (with a failed 2-point conversion), yet Cleveland pulled away with Dawson nailing a 29-yard field goal.

With their first win of the season, the Browns' record improved to 1–3.

=== Week 5: Bye Week ===
The Browns entered their bye week with a record of 1–3. The team used the bye week to rest and allow injured players to recover. The Browns also used the extra week to better prepare for their Week 6 opponent: the defending champion New York Giants.

==== Winslow's Staph Infection ====
Browns' tight end Kellen Winslow II was hospitalized on October 9 with an undisclosed illness (later revealed to be a staph infection). Winslow spent four nights in the hospital and did not play in the Browns' game against the Giants. Citing Winslow's privacy, the Browns did not comment on his illness.

=== Week 6: vs. New York Giants ===
Week 6: New York Giants at Cleveland Browns – Game Summary

Quarter	1	2	3	4	Total
Giants	0	14	0	0	14
Browns	3	14	3	15	35

at Cleveland Browns Stadium, Cleveland, Ohio

- Game time: 8:30 PM EDT
- Game weather: 68 °F (20 °C) (Clear Skies)
- Game attendance: 73,102
- Referee: John Parry
- TV announcers (ESPN): Mike Tirico, Ron Jaworski, Tony Kornheiser, Michele Tafoya, & Suzy Kolber

Game information

First quarter

- CLE – Phil Dawson 28-yard field goal, 10:08. Browns 3–0. Drive: 9 plays, 65 yards, 4:52.

Second quarter

- NYG – Brandon Jacobs 7-yard run (John Carney kick), 12:09. Giants 7–3. Drive: 6 plays, 58 yards, 3:24.
- CLE – Jamal Lewis 4-yard run (Phil Dawson kick), 11:10. Browns 10–7. Drive: 3 plays, 74 yards, 0:59.
- CLE – Darnell Dinkins 22-yard pass from Derek Anderson (Phil Dawson kick), 2:15. Browns 17–7. Drive: 9 plays, 77 yards, 5:36.
- NYG – Plaxico Burress 3-yard pass from Eli Manning (John Carney kick), 0:12. Browns 17–14. Drive: 10 plays, 79 yards, 2:03.

Third quarter

- CLE – Phil Dawson 26-yard field goal, 11:55. Browns 20–14. Drive: 6 plays, 38 yards, 2:53.

Fourth quarter

- CLE – Braylon Edwards 11-yard pass from Derek Anderson (Phil Dawson kick), 14:55. Browns 27–14. Drive: 14 plays, 87 yards, 8:16.
- CLE – Eric A. Wright 94-yard interception return (Anderson pass to Edwards), 8:07. Browns 35–14

Top passers

- NYG – Eli Manning – 18/28, 196 yards, TD, 3 INT
- CLE – Derek Anderson – 18/29, 310 yards, 2 TD

Top rushers

- NYG – Derrick Ward – 10 rushes, 101 yards
- CLE – Jamal Lewis – 21 rushes, 88 yards, TD

Top receivers

- NYG – Steve Smith – 9 receptions, 94 yards
- CLE – Braylon Edwards – 5 receptions, 154 yards, TD

Coming off their bye week, the Browns went home, donned their throwback uniforms, and played a crucial Week 6 interconference duel with the defending Super Bowl champions, the New York Giants, on Monday Night Football. Also Tom Coughlin’s first game in Cleveland since the 2001 Bottlegate incident when he was with the Jaguars.

In the first quarter, Cleveland drew first blood as kicker Phil Dawson got a 28-yard field goal. In the second quarter, the Giants responded as RB Brandon Jacobs had a touchdown run. The Browns would answer with two touchdowns: A run by RB Jamal Lewis and with QB Derek Anderson pass to TE Darnell Dinkins. New York closed out the half with QB Eli Manning completing a TD pass to WR Plaxico Burress.

In the third quarter, Cleveland added onto its lead as Dawson nailed a 26-yard field goal. The Browns pulled away in the fourth quarter with a touchdown pass from Anderson to WR Braylon Edwards, as well as an Eric Wright interception returned for a touchdown.

With the impressive win, Cleveland improved to 2–3. This was also the Browns' first win on Monday Night Football since 1993.

==== Crennel Named Coach of the Week ====
After the Browns' victory over the Giants, head coach Romeo Crennel received NFL Coach of the Week honors for Week 6.

=== Week 7: at Washington Redskins ===
Week 7: Cleveland Browns at Washington Redskins – Game Summary

Quarter	1	2	3	4	Total
Browns	0	0	3	8	11
Redskins	0	0	7	7	14

at FedExField, Landover, Maryland

- Game time: 4:15 PM EDT
- Game weather: 59 °F (15 °C) (Sunny)
- Game attendance: 90,487
- Referee: Terry McAulay
- TV announcers (CBS): Ian Eagle & Solomon Wilcots

Game information

First quarter

- No scoring plays

Second quarter

- No scoring plays

Third quarter

- WSH – Clinton Portis 3-yard run (Shaun Suisham kick), 7:38. Redskins 7–0. Drive: 6 plays, 62 yards, 2:57.
- CLE – Phil Dawson 37-yard field goal, 2:48. Redskins 7–3. Drive: 10 plays, 58 yards, 4:47.

Fourth quarter

- WSH – Santana Moss 18-yard pass from Jason Campbell (Shaun Suisham kick), 12:36. Redskins 14–3. Drive: 3 plays, 49 yards, 1:14.
- CLE – Josh Cribbs 1-yard pass from Derek Anderson (Derek Anderson pass to Braylon Edwards), 2:49. Redskins 14–11. Drive: 5 plays, 29 yards, 2:52.

Top passers

- CLE – Derek Anderson – 14/37, 136 yards, TD
- WSH – Jason Campbell – 14/23, 164 yards, TD

Top rushers

- CLE – Jamal Lewis – 19 rushes, 80 yards
- WSH – Clinton Portis – 27 rushes, 175 yards, TD

Top receivers

- CLE – Braylon Edwards – 4 receptions, 58 yards
- WSH – Santana Moss – 4 receptions, 75 yards, TD

Coming off their impressive Monday Night home win over the Giants, the Browns flew to Fedex Field for a Week 7 duel with the Washington Redskins. After a scoreless first half, Cleveland trailed in the third quarter, as Redskins RB Clinton Portis got a 3-yard TD run. The Browns would respond with kicker Phil Dawson nailing a 37-yard field goal. In the fourth quarter, Washington answered with QB Jason Campbell completing an 18-yard TD pass to WR Santana Moss. Cleveland tried to rally as QB Derek Anderson completed a 1-yard TD pass to WR/KR Josh Cribbs (along with a 2-point conversion pass to WR Braylon Edwards). However, Dawson's game-tying 54-yard field goal attempt sailed wide right, preserving the Redskins' win.

With the loss, the Browns fell to 2–4.

==== Winslow Suspended ====
On October 21, the Browns suspended TE Kellen Winslow II for one game because of comments made after the Browns' loss to the Redskins. Winslow said he was unhappy about the way the Browns organization treated him while he was out last week for an undisclosed illness, which has since been confirmed to be a staph infection. He told reporters that he felt as though he was being treated like "a piece of meat," and that he was unhappy that general manager Phil Savage did not contact him while he was hospitalized. Savage announce that Winslow was being suspended for the team's game against the Jaguars, without pay, for "conduct detrimental to the club."

Winslow planned to appeal the suspension, but the hearing was not scheduled until October 28, two days after the Jaguars game.

On October 25, the Browns rescinded Winslow's suspension. Although he did not play the game against the Jaguars, he received his game check minus a $25,000 fine.

=== Week 8: at Jacksonville Jaguars ===
Week 8: Cleveland Browns at Jacksonville Jaguars – Game Summary

Quarter	1	2	3	4	Total
Browns	7	10	0	6	23
Jaguars	0	7	7	3	17

at Jacksonville Municipal Stadium, Jacksonville, Florida

- Game time: 4:05 PM EDT
- Game weather: 72 °F (22 °C) (Sunny)
- Game attendance: 64,775
- Referee: Alberto Riveron
- TV announcers (CBS): Dick Enberg & Randy Cross

Game information

First quarter

- CLE – Donté Stallworth 3-yard pass from Derek Anderson (Phil Dawson kick), 2:08. Browns 7–0. Drive: 9 plays, 80 yards, 4:44.

Second quarter

- JAX – Reggie Williams 5-yard pass from David Garrard (Josh Scobee kick), 10:28. Tied 7–7. Drive: 13 plays, 74 yards, 6:40.
- CLE – Jamal Lewis 2-yard run (Phil Dawson kick), 7:20. Browns 14–7. Drive: 6 plays, 34 yards, 3:08.
- CLE – Phil Dawson 32-yard field goal, 4:09. Browns 17–7. Drive: 5 plays, 49 yards, 1:47.

Third quarter

- JAX – Matt Jones 8-yard pass from David Garrard (Josh Scobee kick), 10:27. Browns 17–14. Drive: 9 plays, 72 yards, 4:33.

Fourth quarter

- JAX – Josh Scobee 53-yard field goal, 8:48. Tied 17–17. Drive: 7 plays, 19 yards, 2:17.
- CLE – Phil Dawson 20-yard field goal, 4:35. Browns 20–17. Drive: 10 plays, 21 yards, 4:13.
- CLE – Phil Dawson 42-yard field goal, 4:11. Browns 23–17. Drive: 4 plays, 0 yards, 0:21.

Top passers

- CLE – Derek Anderson – 14/27, 246 yards, TD
- JAX – David Garrard – 25/42, 283 yards, 2 TD

Top rushers

- CLE – Jamal Lewis – 20 rushes, 81 yards, TD
- JAX – David Garrard – 7 rushes, 59 yards

Top receivers

- CLE – Steve Heiden – 3 receptions, 73 yards
- JAX – Matt Jones – 8 receptions, 117 yards, TD

Hoping to rebound from their last-second road loss to the Redskins, the Browns flew to Jacksonville Municipal Stadium for a Week 8 duel with the Jacksonville Jaguars. In the first quarter, Cleveland drew first blood as QB Derek Anderson completed a 3-yard TD pass to WR Donté Stallworth. In the second quarter, the Jaguars tied the game as QB David Garrard completed a 5-yard TD pass to WR Reggie Williams. The Browns responded with RB Jamal Lewis getting a 2-yard TD run, along with kicker Phil Dawson getting a 32-yard field goal.

In the third quarter, Jacksonville drew closer as Garrard completed an 8-yard TD pass to WR Matt Jones. In the fourth quarter, the Jaguars tied the game as kicker Josh Scobee made a 53-yard field goal. Afterwards, Cleveland regained the lead with Dawson nailing a 20-yard and a 42-yard field goal, with the defense fending off Jacksonville's last attempt at a comeback.

With the win, the Browns improved to 3–4.

=== Week 9: vs. Baltimore Ravens ===
Week 9: Baltimore Ravens at Cleveland Browns – Game Summary

Quarter	1	2	3	4	Total
Ravens	10	3	7	17	37
Browns	7	6	14	0	27

at Cleveland Browns Stadium, Cleveland, Ohio

- Game time: 1:00 PM EST
- Game weather: 52 °F (11 °C) (Sunny)
- Game attendance: 73,078
- Referee: Scott Green
- TV announcers (CBS): Kevin Harlan & Rich Gannon

Game information

First quarter

- BAL – Matt Stover 41-yard field goal, 10:43. Ravens 3–0. Drive: 9 plays, 14 yards, 3:21.
- BAL – Mark J. Clayton 47-yard pass from Joe Flacco (Matt Stover kick), 5:28. Ravens 10–0. Drive: 2 plays, 47 yards, 0:49.
- CLE – Josh Cribbs 92-yard kickoff return (Phil Dawson kick), 5:19. Ravens 10–7.

Second quarter

- CLE – Phil Dawson 23-yard field goal, 5:53. Tied 10–10. Drive: 11 plays, 74 yards, 5:39.
- BAL – Matt Stover 32-yard field goal, 0:32. Ravens 13–10. Drive: 12 plays, 66 yards, 5:21.
- CLE – Phil Dawson 54-yard field goal, 0:07. Tied 13–13. Drive: 5 plays, 30 yards, 0:26.

Third quarter

- CLE – Braylon Edwards 28-yard pass from Derek Anderson (Phil Dawson kick), 13:13. Browns 20–13. Drive: 1 play, 28 yards, 0:08.
- CLE – Jason Wright 7-yard pass from Derek Anderson (Phil Dawson kick), 6:17. Browns 27–13. Drive: 8 plays, 72 yards, 4:57.
- BAL – Le'Ron McClain 1-yard run (Matt Stover kick), 1:15. Browns 27–20. Drive: 11 plays, 79 yards, 4:57.

Fourth quarter

- BAL – Derrick Mason 28-yard pass from Joe Flacco (Matt Stover kick), 14:07. Tied 27–27. Drive: 3 plays, 42 yards, 1:03.
- BAL – Matt Stover 22-yard field goal, 5:40. Ravens 30–27. Drive: 5 plays, 59 yards, 1:54.
- BAL – Terrell Suggs 42-yard interception return (Matt Stover kick), 2:52. Ravens 37–27.

Top passers

- BAL – Joe Flacco – 17/29, 248 yards, 2 TD
- CLE – Derek Anderson – 17/33, 219 yards, 2 TD, INT

Top rushers

- BAL – Ray Rice – 21 rushes, 154 yards
- CLE – Jamal Lewis – 19 rushes, 49 yards

Top receivers

- BAL – Derrick Mason – 9 receptions, 136 yards, TD
- CLE – Braylon Edwards – 4 receptions, 86 yards, TD

Coming off their road win over the Jaguars, the Browns went home for a Week 9 AFC North rematch with the Baltimore Ravens. In the first quarter, Cleveland trailed early as Ravens kicker Matt Stover kicked a 41-yard field goal, along with QB Joe Flacco completing a 47-yard TD pass to WR Mark Clayton. The Browns immediately responded with WR Josh Cribbs returning a kickoff 92 yards for a touchdown. In the second quarter, Cleveland increased its lead with kicker Phil Dawson kicking a 23-yard field goal. Baltimore responded with Stover making a 32-yard field goal, yet the Browns replied with Dawson's 54-yard field goal.

In the third quarter, Cleveland took the lead as QB Derek Anderson completed a 28-yard TD pass to WR Braylon Edwards and a 7-yard TD pass to RB Jason Wright. The Ravens responded with FB Le'Ron McClain's 1-yard TD run. In the fourth quarter, Baltimore rallied as Flacco completed a 28-yard TD pass to WR Derrick Mason, Stover kicking a 22-yard field goal, and LB Terrell Suggs returning an interception 42 yards for a touchdown.

With the loss, the Browns fell to 3–5.

==== Quinn Named Starter ====
On November 3, it was announced that quarterback Derek Anderson would be benched in favor of QB Brady Quinn for the Browns' next game against the Denver Broncos.

=== Week 10: vs. Denver Broncos ===
Week 10: Denver Broncos at Cleveland Browns – Game Summary

Quarter	1	2	3	4	Total
Broncos	7	3	3	21	34
Browns	7	13	3	7	30

at Cleveland Browns Stadium, Cleveland, Ohio

- Game time: 8:15 PM EST
- Game weather: 57 °F (14 °C) (Clear)
- Game attendance: 73,141
- Referee: Bill Leavy
- TV announcers (NFL Network): Bob Papa & Cris Collinsworth

Game information

First quarter

- DEN – Ryan Torain 1-yard run (Matt Prater kick), 7:08. Broncos 7–0. Drive: 9 plays, 86 yards, 4:48.
- CLE – Kellen Winslow II 5-yard pass from Brady Quinn (Phil Dawson kick), 3:47. Tied 7–7. Drive: 6 plays, 59 yards, 3:25.

Second quarter

- CLE – Phil Dawson 24-yard field goal, 12:48. Browns 10–7. Drive: 10 plays, 67 yards, 3:30.
- CLE – Kellen Winslow II 16-yard pass from Brady Quinn (Phil Dawson kick), 10:36. Browns 17–7. Drive: 3 plays, 20 yards, 1:24.
- DEN – Matt Prater 35-yard field goal, 5:55. Browns 17–10. Drive: 10 plays, 60 yards, 4:41.
- CLE – Phil Dawson 52-yard field goal, 1:14. Browns 20–10. Drive: 8 plays, 45 yards, 4:39.

Third quarter

- CLE – Phil Dawson 33-yard field goal, 10:25. Browns 23–10. Drive: 10 plays, 64 yards, 4:39.
- DEN – Matt Prater 30-yard field goal, 5:40. Browns 23–13. Drive: 10 plays, 60 yards, 4:44.

Fourth quarter

- DEN – Eddie Royal 93-yard pass from Jay Cutler (Matt Prater kick), 13:43. Browns 23–20. Drive: 1 play, 93 yards, 0:13.
- DEN – Daniel Graham 27-yard pass from Jay Cutler (Matt Prater kick), 10:00. Broncos 27–23. Drive: 8 plays, 62 yards, 2:48.
- CLE – Jamal Lewis 1-yard run (Phil Dawson kick), 5:00. Browns 30–27. Drive: 9 plays, 78 yards, 4:53.
- DEN – Brandon Marshall 11-yard pass from Jay Cutler (Matt Prater kick), 1:17. Broncos 34–30. Drive: 13 plays, 78 yards, 3:43.

Top passers

- DEN – Jay Cutler – 24/42, 447 yards, 3 TD, INT
- CLE – Brady Quinn – 23/35, 239 yards, 2 TD

Top rushers

- DEN – Ryan Torain – 12 rushes, 68 yards, TD
- CLE – Jamal Lewis – 19 rushes, 60 yards, TD

Top receivers

- DEN – Eddie Royal – 6 receptions, 164 yards, TD
- CLE – Kellen Winslow II – 10 receptions, 111 yards, 2 TD

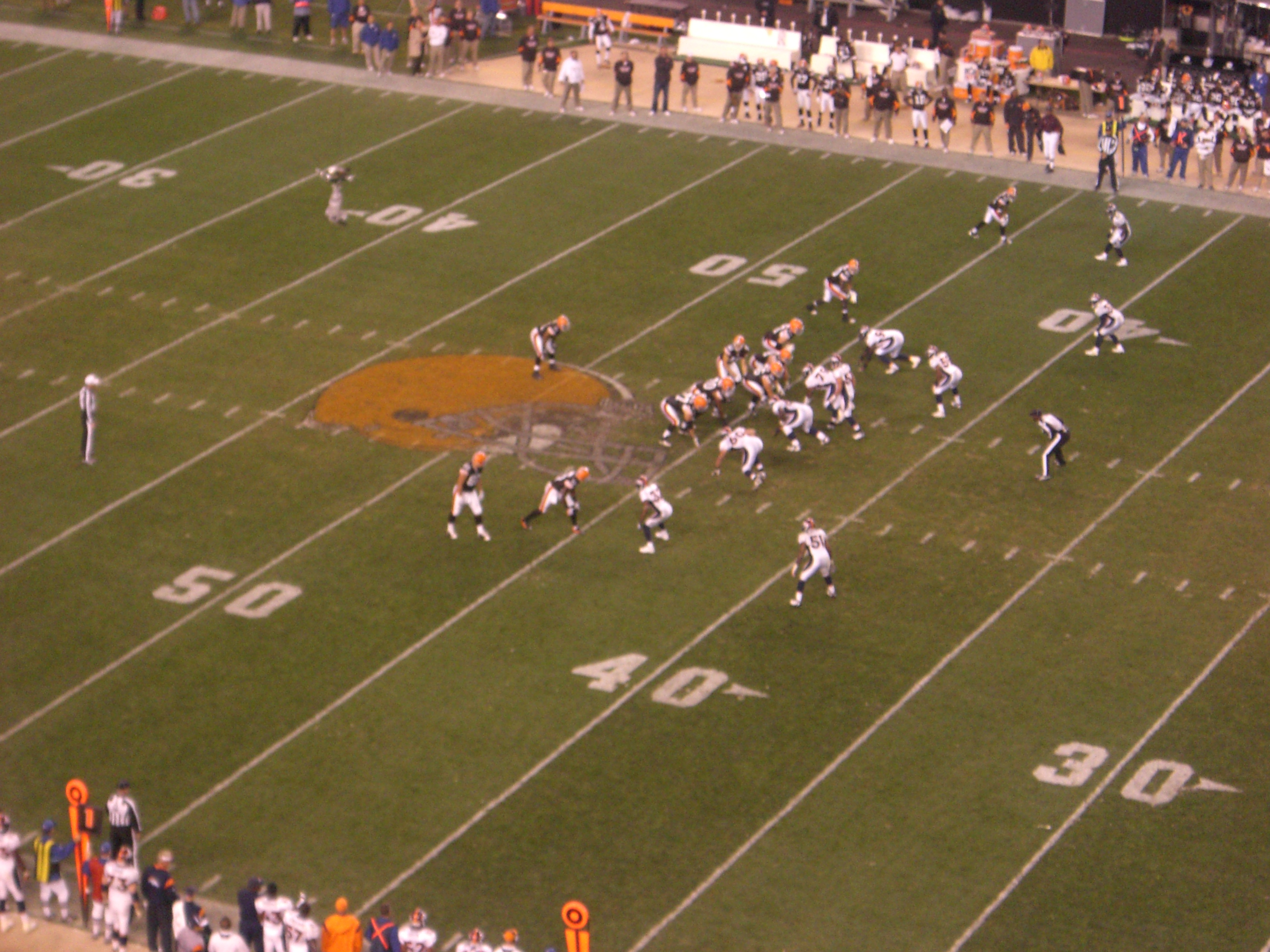
Cleveland Browns vs. Denver Broncos, November 6, 2008

Hoping to rebound from their season-sweeping loss to the Ravens, the Browns stayed at home for a Week 10 Thursday night game against the Denver Broncos. In the first quarter, Cleveland trailed early as Broncos RB Ryan Torain got a 1-yard TD run. The Browns would respond as QB Brady Quinn, making his first career start, completed a 5-yard TD pass to TE Kellen Winslow. In the second quarter, Cleveland took the lead as kicker Phil Dawson made a 24-yard field goal, along with Quinn hooking up with Winslow again on a 16-yard TD pass. Denver would answer with kicker Matt Prater making a 35-yard field goal. The Browns would close out the half with Dawson making a 52-yard field goal.

In the third quarter, Cleveland added onto its lead as Dawson got a 33-yard field goal. The Broncos would reply with Prater making a 30-yard field. In the fourth quarter, Denver regained the lead as QB Jay Cutler completing a 93-yard TD pass to WR Eddie Royal and a 27-yard TD pass to TE Daniel Graham. The Browns would respond with RB Jamal Lewis getting a 1-yard TD run. However, the Broncos replied with Cutler completing an 11-yard TD pass to WR Brandon Marshall. Cleveland tried to come back, but Denver's defense stiffened.

With the loss, the Browns fell to 3–6, making it impossible to improve on their 10–6 record from the 2007 season.

This also marked Cleveland's eighth-straight loss to Denver.

=== Week 11: at Buffalo Bills ===
Week 11: Cleveland Browns at Buffalo Bills – Game Summary

Quarter	1	2	3	4	Total
Browns	6	7	3	13	29
Bills	0	10	3	14	27

at Ralph Wilson Stadium, Orchard Park, New York

- Game time: 8:30 PM EST
- Game weather: 30 °F (−1 °C) (Partly Cloudy)
- Game attendance: 71,645
- Referee: Jerome Boger
- TV announcers (ESPN): Mike Tirico, Ron Jaworski, Tony Kornheiser, Michele Tafoya, & Suzy Kolber

Game information

First quarter

- CLE – Phil Dawson 40-yard field goal, 9:29. Browns 3–0. Drive: 6 plays, 26 yards, 2:11.
- CLE – Phil Dawson 33-yard field goal, 2:28. Browns 6–0. Drive: 4 plays, -3 yards, 0:53.

Second quarter

- CLE – Josh Cribbs 2-yard run (Phil Dawson kick), 9:52. Browns 13–0. Drive: 12 plays, 95 yards, 5:57.
- BUF – Marshawn Lynch 18-yard pass from Trent Edwards (Rian Lindell kick), 6:20. Browns 13–7. Drive: 6 plays, 59 yards, 3:32.
- BUF – Rian Lindell 26-yard field goal, 0:00. Browns 13–10. Drive: 13 plays, 55 yards, 4:41.

Third quarter

- CLE – Phil Dawson 43-yard field goal, 6:27. Browns 16–10. Drive: 9 plays, 37 yards, 4:20.
- BUF – Rian Lindell 31-yard field goal, 0:22. Browns 16–13. Drive: 11 plays, 44 yards, 6:05.

Fourth quarter

- CLE – Jerome Harrison 72-yard run (Phil Dawson kick), 14:47. Browns 23–13. Drive: 2 plays, 83 yards, 0:35.
- BUF – Leodis McKelvin 98-yard kickoff return (Rian Lindell kick), 14:33. Browns 23–20.
- CLE – Phil Dawson 22-yard field goal, 11:32. Browns 26–20. Drive: 9 plays, 43 yards, 3:01.
- BUF – Trent Edwards 1-yard run (Rian Lindell kick), 2:25. Bills 27–26. Drive: 5 plays, 48 yards, 2:48.
- CLE – Phil Dawson 56-yard field goal, 1:39. Browns 29–27. Drive: 7 plays, 28 yards, 0:46.

Top passers

- CLE – Brady Quinn – 14/36, 185 yards
- BUF – Trent Edwards – 16/26, 148 yards, TD, 3 INT

Top rushers

- CLE – Jerome Harrison – 3 rushes, 80 yards, TD
- BUF – Marshawn Lynch – 23 rushes, 119 yards

Top receivers

- CLE – Braylon Edwards – 8 receptions, 104 yards
- BUF – Marshawn Lynch – 10 receptions, 58 yards, TD

Trying to snap a two-game losing streak, the Browns flew to Ralph Wilson Stadium for a Week 11 MNF duel with the Buffalo Bills. In the first quarter, Cleveland took advantage of early Bills miscues as kicker Phil Dawson kicked two field goals. In the second quarter, the Browns increased their lead as Josh Cribbs scored a 2-yard TD run. Buffalo responded with QB Trent Edwards completing an 18-yard TD pass to RB Marshawn Lynch, along with kicker Rian Lindell getting a 26-yard field goal.

In the third quarter, Cleveland answered with Dawson getting a 43-yard field goal. The Bills would reply with Lindell making a 31-yard field goal. In the fourth quarter, the Browns greatly answered with RB Jerome Harrison getting a 72-yard TD run. Buffalo would immediately respond with CB Leodis McKelvin returning a kickoff 98 yards for a touchdown and would take the lead on a 1-yard TD run by Edwards. Afterwards, the Browns regained the lead as Dawson nailed a 56-yard field goal. Buffalo did try to make a comeback, yet Lindell's 47-yard field goal sailed wide right, preserving Cleveland's victory and preventing them from becoming the first NFL team to lose three straight games after having a lead of 13 or more points in each of them.

With the win, the Browns improved to 4–6.

==== Phil Savage E-Mail controversy ====
Browns General Manager Phil Savage received a lot of criticism when he received an e-mail from a Browns fans during the Bills game, which read the following:

You are easily the worst GM in the NFL. Chud, Crennel and Tucker should NOT have jobs. How the hell do you play prevent defense the entire game? How do you NOT use Jerome Harrison more? Why the hell would you throw the ball with 6 minutes left? This is officially a regime that is worse than Butch Davis's. By the way, just like last week – this email was written while the Browns still had the lead.

After the game, Savage promptly responded to the fan with the following:

Go root for Buffalo-f#@* you

=== Week 12: vs. Houston Texans ===
Week 12: Houston Texans at Cleveland Browns – Game Summary

Quarter	1	2	3	4	Total
Texans	7	6	3	0	16
Browns	0	6	0	0	6

at Cleveland Browns Stadium, Cleveland, Ohio

- Game time: 1:00 PM EST
- Game weather: 37 °F (3 °C) (Sunny)
- Game attendance: 72,077
- Referee: Ed Hochuli
- TV announcers (CBS): Kevin Harlan & Rich Gannon

Game information

First quarter

- HOU – Kevin Walter 17-yard pass from Sage Rosenfels (Kris Brown kick), 6:55. Texans 7–0. Drive: 14 plays, 70 yards, 8:11.

Second quarter

- HOU – Kris Brown 31-yard field goal, 13:43. Texans 10–0. Drive: 10 plays, 28 yards, 5:58.
- CLE – Phil Dawson 32-yard field goal, 8:03. Texans 10–3. Drive: 12 plays, 62 yards, 5:38.
- CLE – Phil Dawson 32-yard field goal, 2:24. Texans 10–6. Drive: 5 plays, 56 yards, 1:14.
- HOU – Kris Brown 31-yard field goal, 0:07. Texans 13–6. Drive: 12 plays, 74 yards, 2:17.

Third quarter

- HOU – Kris Brown 36-yard field goal, 8:53. Texans 16–6. Drive: 5 plays, 25 yards, 1:55.

Fourth quarter

- No scoring plays

Top passers

- HOU – Sage Rosenfels – 24/32, 275 yards, TD, 2 INT
- CLE – Brady Quinn – 8/18, 94 yards, 2 INT

Top rushers

- HOU – Steve Slaton – 21 rushes, 73 yards
- CLE – Jamal Lewis – 10 rushes, 58 yards

Top receivers

- HOU – Andre Johnson – 10 receptions, 116 yards
- CLE – Braylon Edwards – 5 receptions, 85 yards

Coming off their MNF road win over the Bills, the Browns went home for a Week 12 duel with the Houston Texans. In the first quarter, Cleveland trailed early as Texans QB Sage Rosenfels completed a 17-yard TD pass to WR Kevin Walter. In the second quarter, Houston increased its lead as kicker Kris Brown got a 31-yard field goal. The Browns would respond with kicker Phil Dawson getting a pair of 32-yard field goals, but the Texans answered with Brown's 31-yard field goal. In the third quarter, Houston kept its momentum going with Brown nailing a 31-yard field goal. Cleveland tried to rally, but Houston's defense was too much.

With the loss, the Browns fell to 4–7.

==== Quinn out for season ====
On November 25, it was announced that quarterback Brady Quinn would be out for the season due to a fractured right index finger suffered in the Browns' week 11 duel with the Buffalo Bills. Derek Anderson was announced to be the starter for their next game against the Indianapolis Colts.

=== Week 13: vs. Indianapolis Colts ===
Week 13: Indianapolis Colts at Cleveland Browns – Game Summary

Quarter	1	2	3	4	Total
Colts	3	0	0	7	10
Browns	3	3	0	0	6

at Cleveland Browns Stadium, Cleveland, Ohio

- Game time: 1:00 PM EST
- Game weather: 42 °F (6 °C) (Rain)
- Game attendance: 72,411
- Referee: Terry McAulay
- TV announcers (CBS): Dick Enberg & Randy Cross

Game information

First quarter

- CLE – Phil Dawson 34-yard field goal, 9:09. Browns 3–0. Drive: 10 plays, 30 yards, 5:32.
- IND – Adam Vinatieri 30-yard field goal, 2:02. Tied 3–3. Drive: 12 plays, 65 yards, 7:06.

Second quarter

- CLE – Phil Dawson 25-yard field goal, 7:36. Browns 6–3. Drive: 16 plays, 66 yards, 9:23.

Third quarter

- No scoring plays

Fourth quarter

- IND – Robert Mathis 37-yard fumble return (Adam Vinatieri kick), 9:55. Colts 10–6.

Top passers

- IND – Peyton Manning – 15/21, 125 yards, 2 INT
- CLE – Derek Anderson – 16/26, 110 yards

Top rushers

- IND – Joseph Addai – 15 rushes, 57 yards
- CLE – Jamal Lewis – 24 rushes, 77 yards

Top receivers

- IND – Reggie Wayne – 4 receptions, 46 yards
- CLE – Braylon Edwards – 2 receptions, 36 yards

Hoping to rebound from their loss to the Texans, the Browns stayed at home for a Week 13 duel with the Indianapolis Colts. In the first quarter, Cleveland struck first as kicker Phil Dawson kicked a 34-yard field goal. The Colts answered with kicker Adam Vinatieri kicking a 30-yard field goal. In the second quarter, the Browns regained the lead as Dawson nailed a 25-yard field goal. However, after a scoreless third quarter, Indianapolis' defense answered in the fourth quarter, as DE Robert Mathis returned a fumble 37 yards for a touchdown. From there on out, Cleveland was unable to come back.

With the loss, the Browns stumbled to 4–8.

==== Anderson out for season ====
On December 1, it was announced that QB Derek Anderson would be done for the season following a torn MCL suffered in the loss to the Colts. Third-string QB Ken Dorsey was announced to be starting for the Browns' next game against the Tennessee Titans.

==== Bruce Gradkowski signed ====
On December 2, the Browns signed free-agent veteran QB Bruce Gradkowski to a two-year contract. Gradkowski will serve as the backup QB under Dorsey for the Browns' next game against the Tennessee Titans.

=== Week 14: at Tennessee Titans ===
Week 14: Cleveland Browns at Tennessee Titans – Game Summary

Quarter	1	2	3	4	Total
Browns	6	0	0	3	9
Titans	0	14	7	7	28

at LP Field, Nashville, Tennessee

- Game time: 1:00 PM EST
- Game weather: 32 °F (0 °C) (Sunny)
- Game attendance: 69,143
- Referee: Ron Winter
- TV announcers (CBS): Don Criqui & Dan Fouts

Game information

First quarter

- CLE – Phil Dawson 47-yard field goal, 11:58. Browns 3–0. Drive: 7 plays, 33 yards, 3:02.
- CLE – Phil Dawson 41-yard field goal, 4:00. Browns 6–0. Drive: 4 plays, 2 yards, 1:28.

Second quarter

- TEN – Ahmard Hall 28-yard pass from Kerry Collins (Rob Bironas kick), 14:10. Titans 7–6. Drive: 10 plays, 68 yards, 4:50.
- TEN – LenDale White 3-yard run (Rob Bironas kick), 1:11. Titans 14–6. Drive: 10 plays, 73 yards, 5:05.

Third quarter

- TEN – Justin Gage 9-yard pass from Kerry Collins (Rob Bironas kick), 11:46. Titans 21–6. Drive: 2 plays, 11 yards, 0:42.

Fourth quarter

- CLE – Phil Dawson 39-yard field goal, 13:30. Titans 21–9. Drive: 11 plays, 24 yards, 3:41.
- TEN – Chris Johnson 25-yard run (Rob Bironas kick), 8:22. Titans 28–9. Drive: 1 play, 25 yards, 0:08.

Top passers

- CLE – Ken Dorsey – 22/43, 150 yards, INT
- TEN – Kerry Collins – 14/23, 155 yards, 2 TD, 2 INT

Top rushers

- CLE – Josh Cribbs – 6 rushes, 24 yards
- TEN – Chris Johnson – 19 rushes, 136 yards, TD

Top receivers

- CLE – Jason Wright – 5 receptions, 40 yards
- TEN – Chris Johnson – 4 receptions, 30 yards

Trying to rebound from back-to-back home losses, the Browns flew to LP Field for a Week 14 duel with the Tennessee Titans. Cleveland struck first in the opening quarter as kicker Phil Dawson got a 47-yard and a 41-yard field goal. The Titans took the lead in the second quarter, as QB Kerry Collins completed a 28-yard touchdown pass to FB Ahmard Hall, along with RB LenDale White got a 3-yard touchdown run. Tennessee would increase its lead in the third quarter as Collins completed a 9-yard touchdown to wide receiver Justin Gage. In the fourth quarter, the Browns to rally as Dawson nailed a 39-yard field goal, yet the Titans pulled away as RB Chris Johnson got a 25-yard touchdown run.

With the loss, Cleveland fell to 4–9.

=== Week 15: at Philadelphia Eagles ===
Week 15: Cleveland Browns at Philadelphia Eagles – Game Summary

Quarter	1	2	3	4	Total
Browns	3	0	0	7	10
Eagles	10	7	3	10	30

at Lincoln Financial Field, Philadelphia, Pennsylvania

- Game time: 8:30 PM EST
- Game weather: 63 °F (17 °C) (Cloudy)
- Game attendance: 69,144
- Referee: Bill Carollo
- TV announcers (ESPN): Mike Tirico, Ron Jaworski, Tony Kornheiser, Michele Tafoya, & Suzy Kolber

Game information

First quarter

- PHI – Kevin Curtis 14-yard pass from Donovan McNabb (David Akers kick), 10:45. Eagles 7–0. Drive: 8 plays, 64 yards, 4:15.
- CLE – Phil Dawson 27-yard field goal, 6:48. Eagles 7–3. Drive: 9 plays, 63 yards, 3:57.
- PHI – David Akers 24-yard field goal, 0:49. Eagles 10–3. Drive: 12 plays, 51 yards, 5:59.

Second quarter

- PHI – Asante Samuel 50-yard interception return (David Akers kick), 4:45. Eagles 17–3.

Third quarter

- PHI – David Akers 34-yard field goal, 3:34. Eagles 20–3. Drive: 14 plays, 63 yards, 7:50.

Fourth quarter

- PHI – David Akers 34-yard field goal, 14:52. Eagles 23–3. Drive: 7 plays, 29 yards, 2:39.
- PHI – Greg Lewis 10-yard pass from Donovan McNabb (David Akers kick), 11:14. Eagles 30–3. Drive: 2 plays, 37 yards, 0:41.
- CLE – Brandon McDonald 24-yard interception return (Phil Dawson kick), 9:11. Eagles 30–10.

Top passers

- CLE – Ken Dorsey – 11/28, 156 yards, 2 INT
- PHI – Donovan McNabb – 26/35, 290 yards, 2 TD, INT

Top rushers

- CLE – Jamal Lewis – 14 rushes, 32 yards
- PHI – Correll Buckhalter – 6 rushes, 55 yards

Top receivers

- CLE – Braylon Edwards – 5 receptions, 102 yards
- PHI – Jason Avant – 5 receptions, 101 yards

Coming off three straight losses without a touchdown, the Cleveland Browns sought to go 3–0 on Monday Night games, this time on the road against the Philadelphia Eagles. The Eagles struck first with a touchdown pass to WR Kevin Curtis. Both teams also traded field goals in the first quarter. CB Asante Samuel extended the Eagles' lead in the second quarter with an interception return for a touchdown, and K David Akers added a field goal in the third quarter. Cleveland could not answer, but DB Brandon McDonald scored the first touchdown for the Browns in 4 games with an interception return in the fourth quarter. This game saw the Browns extend their offensive troubles, going 16 quarters without an offensive touchdown.

With the loss, the Browns fell to 4–10, the third time in four years under Romeo Crennel that the Browns have had double-digit losses.

=== Week 16: vs. Cincinnati Bengals ===
Week 16: Cincinnati Bengals at Cleveland Browns – Game Summary

Quarter	1	2	3	4	Total
Bengals	7	7	0	0	14
Browns	0	0	0	0	0

at Cleveland Browns Stadium, Cleveland, Ohio

- Game time: 1:00 PM EST
- Game weather: 12 °F (−11 °C) (Sunny Wind Chill: −20 °F (−29 °C))
- Game attendance: 72,361
- Referee: Mike Carey
- TV announcers (CBS): Kevin Harlan & Rich Gannon

Game information

First quarter

- CIN – Leon Hall 50-yard interception return (Shayne Graham kick), 8:39. Bengals 7–0.

Second quarter

- CIN – Chris Henry 20-yard pass from Ryan Fitzpatrick (Shayne Graham kick), 8:08. Bengals 14–0. Drive: 15 plays, 82 yards, 8:36.

Third quarter

- No scoring plays

Fourth quarter

- No scoring plays

Top passers

- CIN – Ryan Fitzpatrick – 5/9, 55 yards, TD
- CLE – Ken Dorsey – 10/17, 64 yards, 3 INT

Top rushers

- CIN – Cedric Benson – 38 rushes, 171 yards
- CLE – Jamal Lewis – 16 rushes, 76 yards

Top receivers

- CIN – Chris Johnson – 3 receptions, 27 yards
- CLE – Jason Wright – 6 receptions, 33 yards

Coming off four straight losses in which their offense failed to score a touchdown, the Cleveland Browns played their final home game of the season in near-zero wind chills against the Cincinnati Bengals. The Bengals scored first, with CB Leon Hall intercepting a Ken Dorsey pass and returning it 50 yards for a touchdown in the first quarter. WR Chris Henry completed the scoring by adding on a 20-yard touchdown reception in the second quarter. The shutout marked five straight games in which Cleveland's offense couldn't find the end zone. The only bright spot for the Browns was RB Jamal Lewis, who became the 24th NFL player to reach 10,000 career rushing yards.

With the loss, the Browns fell to 4–11, and ended the season 1–7 at home.

=== Week 17: at Pittsburgh Steelers ===
Week 17: Cleveland Browns at Pittsburgh Steelers – Game Summary

Quarter	1	2	3	4	Total
Browns	0	0	0	0	0
Steelers	0	14	3	14	31

at Heinz Field, Pittsburgh, Pennsylvania

- Game time: 1:00 PM EST
- Game weather: 48 °F (9 °C) (Cloudy)
- Game attendance: 63,553
- Referee: Jeff Triplette
- TV announcers (CBS): Gus Johnson & Steve Tasker

Game information

First quarter

- No scoring plays

Second quarter

- PIT – Willie Parker 34-yard run (Jeff Reed kick), 4:15. Steelers 7–0. Drive: 3 plays, 57 yards, 1:28.
- PIT – Byron Leftwich 8-yard run (Jeff Reed kick), 0:40. Steelers 14–0. Drive: 10 plays, 52 yards, 2:00.

Third quarter

- PIT – Jeff Reed 22-yard field goal, 5:39. Steelers 17–0. Drive: 4 plays, 7 yards, 2:01.

Fourth quarter

- PIT – Gary Russell 3-yard run (Jeff Reed kick), 9:45. Steelers 24–0. Drive: 12 plays, 66 yards, 7:23.
- PIT – Tyrone Carter 32-yard interception return (Jeff Reed kick), 8:52. Steelers 31–0.

Top passers

- CLE – Bruce Gradkowski – 5/16, 18 yards, 2 INT
- PIT – Ben Roethlisberger – 9/14, 110 yards, INT

Top rushers

- CLE – Jamal Lewis – 23 rushes, 94 yards
- PIT – Willie Parker – 23 rushes, 116 yards, TD

Top receivers

- CLE – Donté Stallworth – 1 reception, 12 yards
- PIT – Hines Ward – 6 receptions, 70 yards

Coming off five straight losses without a touchdown on offense, the Cleveland Browns closed out the regular season at Heinz Field in a Week 17 AFC North rematch with their hated rival, the Pittsburgh Steelers. The Steelers put up two touchdowns in the second quarter, a 34-yard run by RB Willie Parker and an 8-yard scramble by QB Byron Leftwich. The Steelers added 17 points in the second half (22-yard Jeff Reed field goal, 3-yard Gary Russell touchdown run, and a 32-yard interception TD return by Tyrone Carter). Cleveland's offensive ineptitude continued. With Dorsey placed on IR, the Browns had to start Bruce Gradkowski who finished the game with a passer rating of 1.0, the lowest in the NFL that season. This was also Cleveland's sixth straight game in which the offense couldn't score a touchdown (an NFL record 24 quarters). Again, the only good news for the Browns was RB Jamal Lewis, who topped 1,000 rushing yards this season. He would become the first Browns running back since Mike Pruitt in 1980 & 1981 to have back-to-back 1,000-yard rushing seasons.

With the loss, the Browns ended their season at 4–12, with a record of 3–5 away from home. This also marked the Browns' eleventh straight loss to the Steelers. This season began a 12-year streak of losing seasons that would end in 2020.

==== Savage and Crennel fired ====
After the game, it was announced that GM Phil Savage was fired. One day later, head coach Romeo Crennel would also be released after the Browns ended their season at 4–12, at the bottom of the AFC North.

== 2009 Pro Bowl ==
Despite the disappointing performance by the team, LT Joe Thomas, DT Shaun Rogers, and LS Ryan Pontbriand were recognized for individual accomplishments as they were named to the AFC roster for the 2009 Pro Bowl. Thomas and Rogers were selected by the pro-bowl voters., and Pontbriand was selected as a "need" player by the Baltimore Ravens coaching staff, who will be coaching the AFC squad.

KR Josh Cribbs was named a first alternate, K Phil Dawson a second alternate, and LG Eric Steinbach and LB D'Qwell Jackson were named third alternates at their respective positions.
