= Mike Dragosavich =

American football player (born 1985)

Profile
- Position: Punter

Personal information
- Born: May 10, 1985 (age 41); Oak Lawn, Illinois, U.S.
- Listed height: 6 ft 6 in (1.98 m)
- Listed weight: 212 lb (96 kg)

Career information
- College: North Dakota State
- NFL draft: 2008: undrafted

Career history
- New England Patriots (2008)*; Cleveland Browns (2008)*; Indianapolis Colts (2009)*
- * Offseason or practice squad member only

Awards and highlights
- 3× First-team All-GWFC (2005–2007); Second-team AP All-American (2005)

Mike Dragosavich (born May 10, 1985) is an American former football punter. He was signed by the New England Patriots as an undrafted free agent in 2008. He played college football at North Dakota State.

Dragosavich was also a member of the Cleveland Browns and Indianapolis Colts.

== Early life and personal ==
Dragosavich was born to Carol Kuracar and Pete Tomich in Oak Lawn, Illinois. He attended Harold L. Richards High School, where he was a first-time all-conference player in football, playing wide receiver and punter, as well as captaining the baseball team. Dagosavich gained internet fame during college when videos of him dancing at his alma-mater's basketball games were posted online.

== College career ==
Dragosavich completed his senior year with the North Dakota State Bison football team in 2007. He led the FCS in average yards per punt. At the 2008 Senior Bowl, he averaged 58 yards per punt in three punts, including a record-breaking 69-yarder.

=== Awards and honors ===
- 2008 Senior Bowl, Texas Vs. The Nation All-Star Challenge
- 2007 College Sporting News FCS Fabulous 50 All-America team
- 2007 All-Great West Football Conference first-team
- 2007 The Sports Network FCS Special Teams Player of the Week
- 2007 GWFC Special Teams Player of the Week
- 2007 Street & Smith FCS Preseason All-America first-team
- 2007 The Sports Network FCS Preseason All-America first-team
- 2007 Lindy's FCS Preseason All-America first-team
- 2006 The Sports Network FCS All-America second-team
- 2006 Football Gazette FCS All-America second-team
- 2006 Football Gazette All-Northwest Region first-team
- 2006 All-Great West Football Conference first-team
- 2005 Associated Press I-AA All-America second-team
- 2005 Football Gazette I-AA All-America second-team
- 2005 CollegeSportsReport.com All-Division I-AA first-team
- 2005 Football Gazette All-Region first-team
- 2005 All-GWFC first-team (media), second-team (coaches)
- 2004 Honorable mention All-GWFC
- I-AA.org National Weekly All-Star
- Three-time Football Gazette Special Teams Player of the Week
- Three-time GWFC Special Teams Player of the Week

== Professional career ==
=== New England Patriots ===
Dragosavich signed a contract with the New England Patriots after going undrafted in the 2008 NFL draft but was released on June 5, 2008.

=== Cleveland Browns ===
Dragosavich was signed to the practice squad of the Cleveland Browns on December 26, 2008. He was re-signed to a future contract on December 30, only to be waived on February 9, 2009.

=== Indianapolis Colts ===
Dragosavich was claimed off waivers by the Indianapolis Colts on February 11, 2009. He was waived by the team on May 4.

== Post-playing career ==
Following his time in the NFL, Dragosavich returned to Fargo, ND in 2010, where he founded a publishing company called Spotlight Media, focusing on printed magazines.

Dragosavich also opened a bar in Fargo, "Herd and Horns Bar and Grill".
