= Marcus Brown (cornerback, born 1986) =

American football player (born 1986)

No. 5
- Position: Cornerback

Personal information
- Born: April 2, 1986 (age 40); Tangipahoa, Louisiana, U.S.
- Listed height: 6 ft 2 in (1.88 m)
- Listed weight: 203 lb (92 kg)

Career information
- High school: Kentwood (LA)
- College: McNeese State
- NFL draft: 2008: undrafted

Career history
- Arizona Cardinals (2008)*; Cincinnati Bengals (2008−2009)*; St. Louis Rams (2009−2010)*; Hartford Colonials (2010); New Orleans VooDoo (2011)
- * Offseason or practice squad member only

Marcus Brown (born April 2, 1986) is an American former football cornerback. He was signed by the Arizona Cardinals as an undrafted free agent in 2008. He played college football at McNeese State.

Brown was also a member of the Cincinnati Bengals, St. Louis Rams, Hartford Colonials, and New Orleans VooDoo.

== Early life ==
At Kentwood High School, Louisiana, Brown was the defensive MVP in state championship game in 2003 with two pass interceptions, fumble recovery and six tackles. He was All-State and All-District after having 43 tackles, six interceptions, two fumbles forced, one recovered and 30 passes broken up during senior season. He also played running back. He was also the state champion in long jump and triple jump three straight years, Brown was also all-district in basketball and an honor roll student.

== College career ==
Brown played at McNeese State and for his career he started 28 of 44 games played totaling 151 tackles, three tackles for loss, 14 pass breakups, five fumble recoveries, one forced fumble and four interceptions that he returned for 52 yards. In 2007, as a senior, he was named honorable mention All-Southland Conference after leading team with four interceptions and nine pass breakups and registered 52 tackles, two fumble recoveries and one forced fumble while starting all 12 games. In 2006, he had 23 tackles. In 2005, he was the third leading tackler on the team with 61 stops and he started seven of nine games and also had three tackles for loss, five passes broken up and three fumbles recovered. In 2004, he was credited with 15 tackles.

== Professional career ==
=== Pre-draft measurables ===
Pre-draft measurables
Height	Weight	40-yard dash	10-yard split	20-yard split	20-yard shuttle	Three-cone drill	Vertical jump	Broad jump	Bench press
6 ft 1 1/8 in (1.86 m)	200 lb (91 kg)	4.32 s	1.48 s	2.52 s	4.03 s	6.98 s	43 1/2 in (1.10 m)	11 ft 6 in (3.51 m)	7 reps
Height, weight, and bench from NFL Combine; all others from McNeese State Pro Day.

=== Arizona Cardinals ===
Brown was signed as an undrafted free agent by the Arizona Cardinals on May 2, 2008. After playing in Arizona's first three preseason games, he was released on August 26, 2008.

=== Cincinnati Bengals ===
Brown was to the Cincinnati Bengals practice squad on December 9, 2008. On December 29, he was signed to a future contract, but was waived on March 6, 2009.

=== St. Louis Rams ===
Brown signed with the St. Louis Rams on March 16, 2009. He was waived on September 1. He was re-signed to the practice squad on November 10.

After his contract expired following the season, Brown was re-signed to a future contract on January 8, 2010. He was waived on May 4, 2010. After being re-signed by the Rams on August 17, Brown was waived again on September 6. Brown was resign with the Rams on September 27. He was released again on December 5

=== Hartford Colonials ===
Brown was signed by the Hartford Colonials on September 8, 2010. He asked to be released on September 26.
