= Matt Sherry =

American football player (born 1984)

No. 88
- Position: Tight end

Personal information
- Born: December 11, 1984 (age 41); Hinsdale, Illinois, U.S.
- Listed height: 6 ft 4 in (1.93 m)
- Listed weight: 255 lb (116 kg)

Career information
- College: Villanova
- NFL draft: 2008: 6th round, 207th overall pick

Career history
- Cincinnati Bengals (2008–2009)

Awards and highlights
- First-team All-CAA (2007)
- Stats at Pro Football Reference

Matt Sherry (born December 11, 1984) is an American former football tight end. He was selected by the Cincinnati Bengals in the sixth round of the 2008 NFL draft with the 207th overall pick. He played college football at Villanova.
