= Michigan–Ohio State football rivalry =

College football rivalry in the United States

- Michigan Wolverines Ohio State Buckeyes
- First meeting: October 16, 1897; Michigan 34, Ohio State 0 Regents Field (Ann Arbor, Michigan)
- Latest meeting: November 29, 2025; Ohio State 27, Michigan 9 Michigan Stadium
- Next meeting: November 28, 2026 in Columbus
- Stadiums: Michigan: Michigan Stadium; Ohio State: Ohio Stadium

Statistics
- Total meetings: 121
- All-time series: Michigan: 62–52–6 (Note: Ohio State vacated all 12 of its victories and its Big Ten Conference championship from the 2010 season. These 12 wins are not included in Ohio State's all-time record, nor is the 2010 Michigan–Ohio State contest counted in the series record between the two teams. See Wikipedia:WikiProject College football/Vacated victories for an explanation of how vacated victories are recorded.)
- Largest victory: Michigan: 86–0 (1902)
- Longest win streak: Michigan: 9 (1901–1909)
- Current win streak: Ohio State: 1 (2025–present)

Locations of Michigan and Ohio State

The Michigan–Ohio State football rivalry, referred to as The Game by some followers, is an American college football rivalry game that is played annually between the Michigan Wolverines and the Ohio State Buckeyes. As of 2025, Michigan has the most wins and Ohio State has the second most wins of any program in the history of NCAA Division I football. The rivalry has gathered profound national interest as many of the games determined the Big Ten Conference title and the resulting Rose Bowl Game matchups, as well as the outcome of the NCAA Division I college football championship. In 2000, the game was ranked by ESPN as the greatest North American sports rivalry ever. The rivalry is listed in Rivals!: The Ten Greatest American Sports Rivalries of the 20th Century, published by Wiley. Encyclopædia Britannica includes the rivalry as one of the ten great sports rivalries in history.

The teams first met in 1897 and have played annually all but once since 1918. The only break in over a century came in 2020 due to a COVID-19 outbreak on Michigan's football team during the COVID-19 pandemic. The game has been played at the end of the regular season since 1935 (except for 1942, 1986, 1998 and 2020). Since 1918, the game's site has alternated between Ann Arbor, Michigan (in odd-numbered years) and Columbus, Ohio (in even-numbered years), and has been played in Ohio Stadium since 1922 and Michigan Stadium since 1927. The Ten Year War from 1969 to 1978, which matched up legendary coaches Woody Hayes from Ohio State and Bo Schembechler from Michigan, was a peak period for both teams and saw seven matchups where both were ranked in the AP top 10, although neither finished atop the polls during this era. Through 2010, Ohio State and Michigan have decided the Big Ten Conference championship between themselves on 22 occasions, and affected the determination of the conference title an additional 27 times. Since the creation of the Big Ten Conference Championship Game in 2011, this rivalry game has affected the determination of the division title 10 times, with six of those instances becoming a de-facto division championship game between the two schools. Since the Big Ten went division-less starting in 2024, this game plays a role in determining the participants in the Big Ten Championship Game three times. With the elimination of the Big Ten Championship Game beginning in 2027, the series will return to its historic role as a direct, regular-season decider for conference standing and postseason positioning.

For many years, the game aired on ABC, usually in the 12:00 p.m. Eastern time slot. For most of the 1990s and early 2000s, ESPN College GameDay would originate that weekend from the game site. Beginning with the 2017 season, the game airs on Fox as a result of that network acquiring the Big Ten's tier-1 rights in the most recent broadcasting contract, and GameDay competitor Big Noon Kickoff originates from the game site. It is often the most viewed college football game of the regular season.

== Series history ==
=== Early years (1897–1949) ===
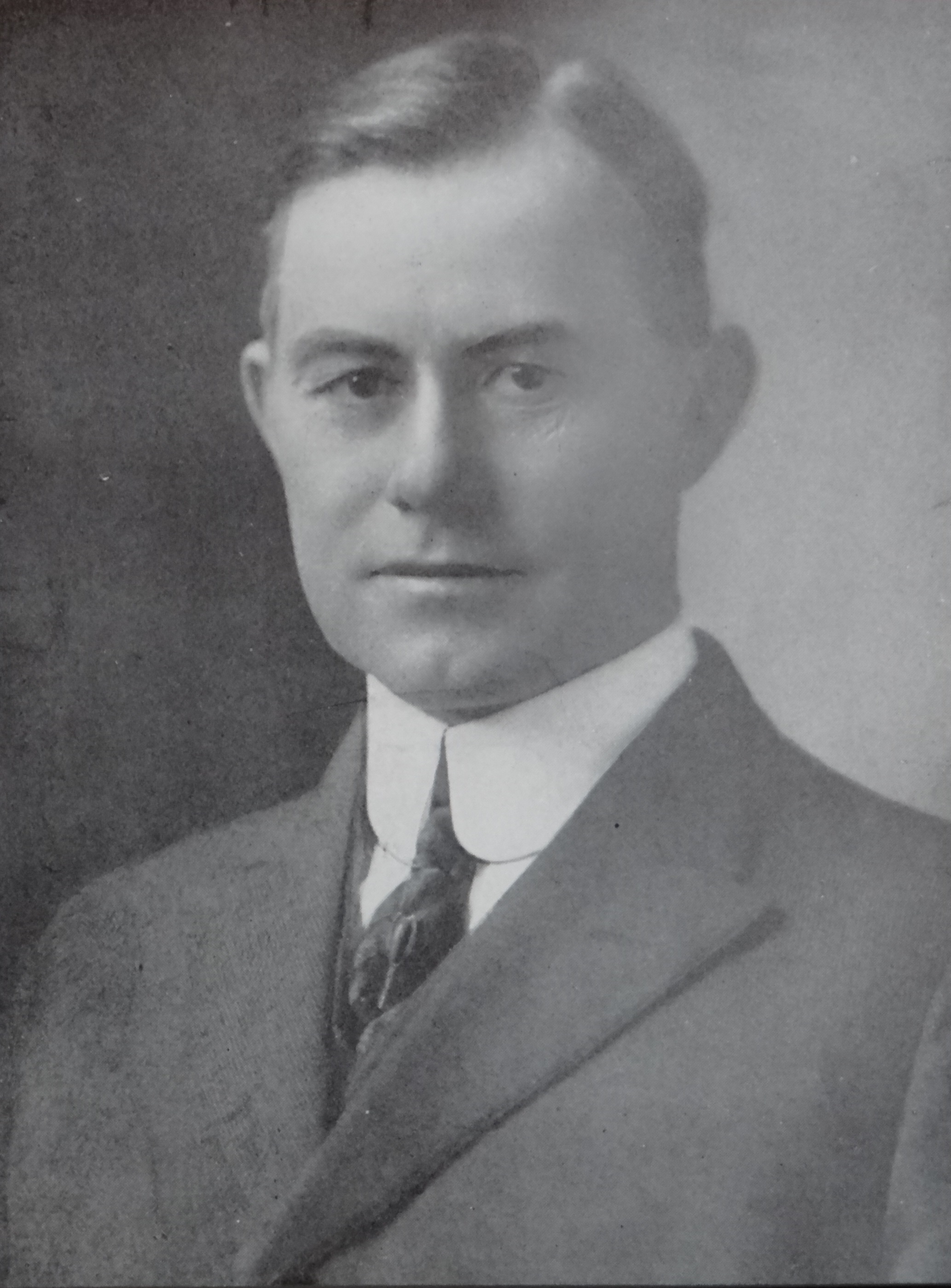
Former Michigan head coach Fielding H. Yost.

When Michigan and Ohio State met for the first time in 1897, the Toledo War might conceivably have remained in the memories of some still living, and the unproductive wanderings of two hostile militias might have been used to stoke the rivalry between a few supporters of the two opposing teams. The inaugural game, held at Ann Arbor, resulted in a shut-out victory for Michigan, with the Wolverines posting a 34–0 win over Ohio State's Buckeyes. The teams did not meet in 1898 or 1899, but played again in 1900.

The first game foretold a long Michigan winning streak, with Michigan winning or tying every game from 1897 to 1912 and thereby compiling a 12–0–2 record before the contest was postponed for several years. The Ohio State Alma Mater "Carmen Ohio" was written on the train ride home to Columbus following the 1902 contest, which saw Ohio State lose to Michigan 86–0. The lyrics and melody (Spanish Chant) have remained largely unchanged since its conception.

Ohio State became a member of the Big Ten in 1912. In 1917, Michigan rejoined the conference after a ten-year absence. In 1918, the teams played their first conference matchup, with Michigan prevailing 14–0 and lodging its eleventh shutout over the Buckeyes. The rivalry has been scheduled annually since then. In 1919, the Buckeyes (led by legendary halfback Chic Harley) won their first game in the series, beating the Wolverines 13–3. The Buckeyes won the following two contests as well, to bring the series record to 13–3–2.

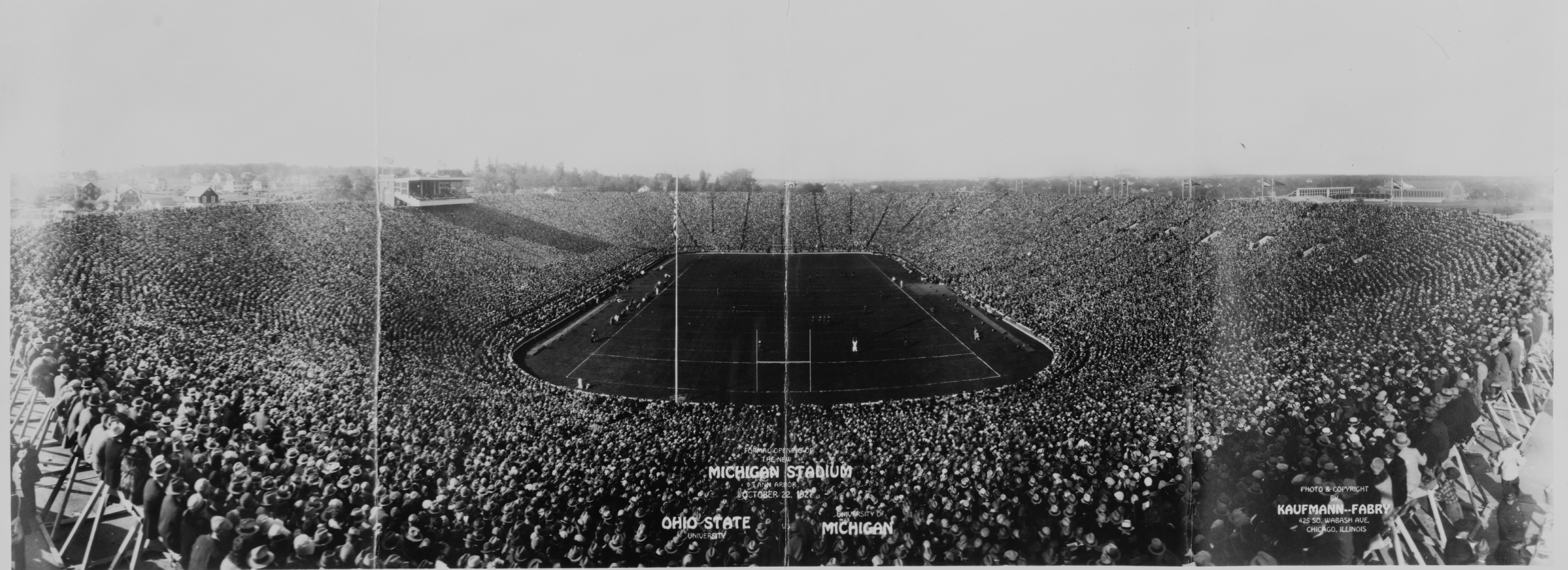
Ohio State was the opponent in the dedication game at Michigan Stadium in Ann Arbor.

Harley's prowess spurred the university to campaign to build a stadium for Ohio State football. The stadium was completed in 1922, and the first of many historic games in Ohio Stadium took place on October 21, 1922, the day the stadium was dedicated in Columbus. In front of a record 71,000 fans, the Wolverines posted another shutout of the home team Buckeyes, 19–0. According to lore, there was a wager on the outcome of this game, and yellow flowers on a blue background still exist today in the upper part of the stadium's rotunda. Michigan won the next five games before OSU picked up the final two victories of the decade. At the end of the 1920s, the series stood at 19–5–2 in favor of Michigan.

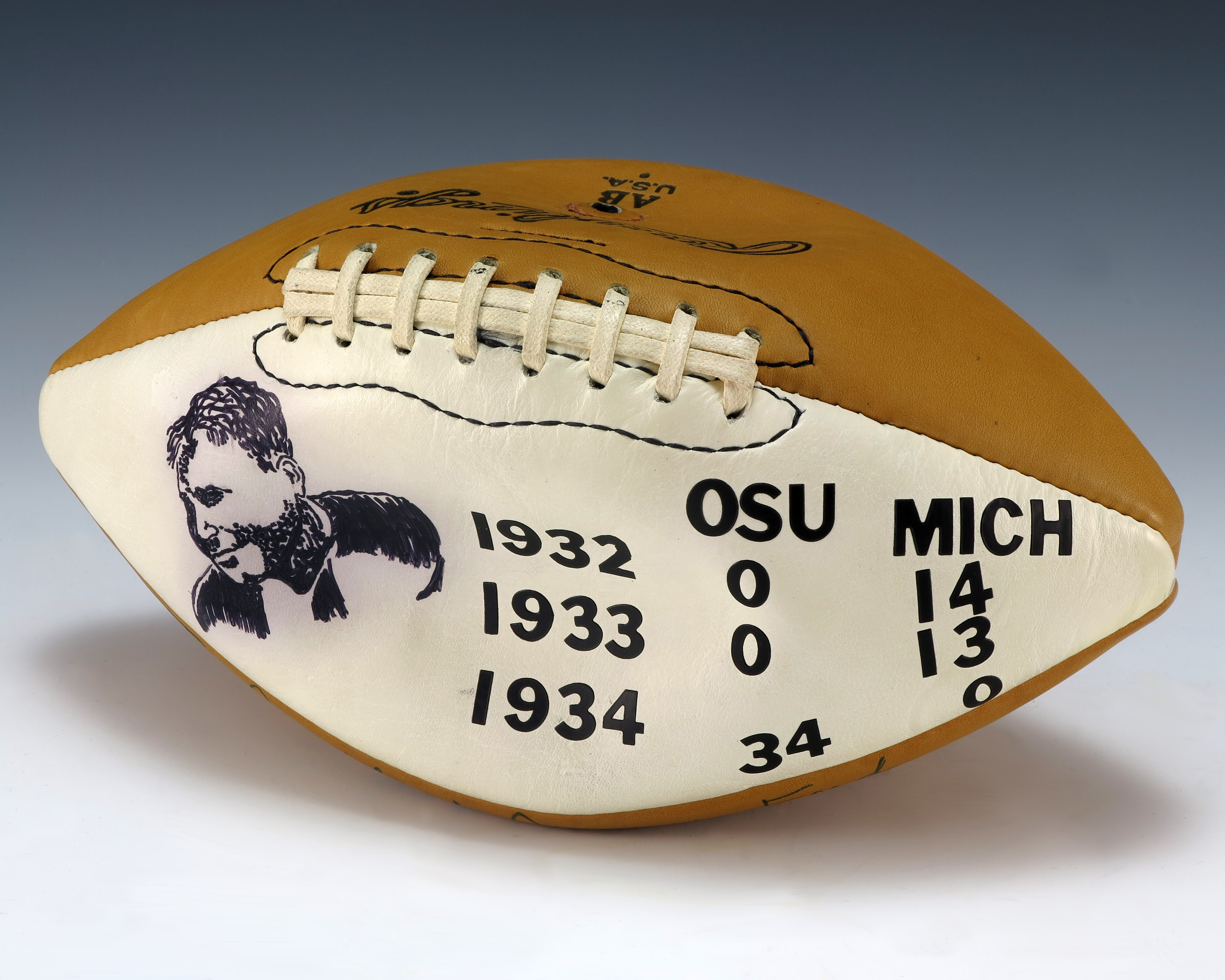
A football signed by Woody Hayes and gifted to President Gerald Ford that lists the scores of the Michigan–Ohio State game from 1932 to 1934, the three years that Ford played on Michigan's varsity team.

Michigan won three of four contests between 1930 and 1933, claiming the national championship twice. In 1934, Francis Schmidt came on as the head coach for Ohio State. The team had lost nine of the previous 12 Michigan-OSU contests, and when a reporter asked Schmidt if Ohio State could beat Michigan that year, he replied, "Of course we can win, Michigan puts their pants on one leg at a time just like we do". The Buckeyes thereupon ran off four straight shutout victories against Michigan, outscoring the Wolverines 114–0 from 1934 to 1937. Schmidt's quote spawned an OSU tradition—since 1934, every Ohio State player receives a gold pants pendant after a victory against Michigan.

Michigan won the three games from 1938 to 1940. The 1940 game, won by Michigan, 40–0, was the benchmark performance of what some consider to be the greatest Michigan team in history, and was the final collegiate game of the tailback tandem of Tom Harmon and Paul Kromer.

In 1941, Michigan and Ohio State met for the first time with each team ranked in the AP Poll, which had started in 1936. The 14th-ranked Buckeyes played the 5th-ranked Wolverines to a 20–20 tie in Ann Arbor.

In 1945, Michigan quarterback Howard Yerges led Michigan to a 7–3 victory over Ohio State. Yerges played for Ohio State in 1943 as a freshman (freshmen were eligible to play during wartime) and then transferred to Michigan in 1944, making him one of three players to play on both sides in the rivalry. Five more times during the 1940s, the teams were both ranked for their annual matchup. Michigan won five of the next seven games before playing to their second tie of the decade in 1949. The series record stood at 30–12–4 at the mid-century mark.

=== "Snow Bowl" and Woody Hayes (1950–1968) ===
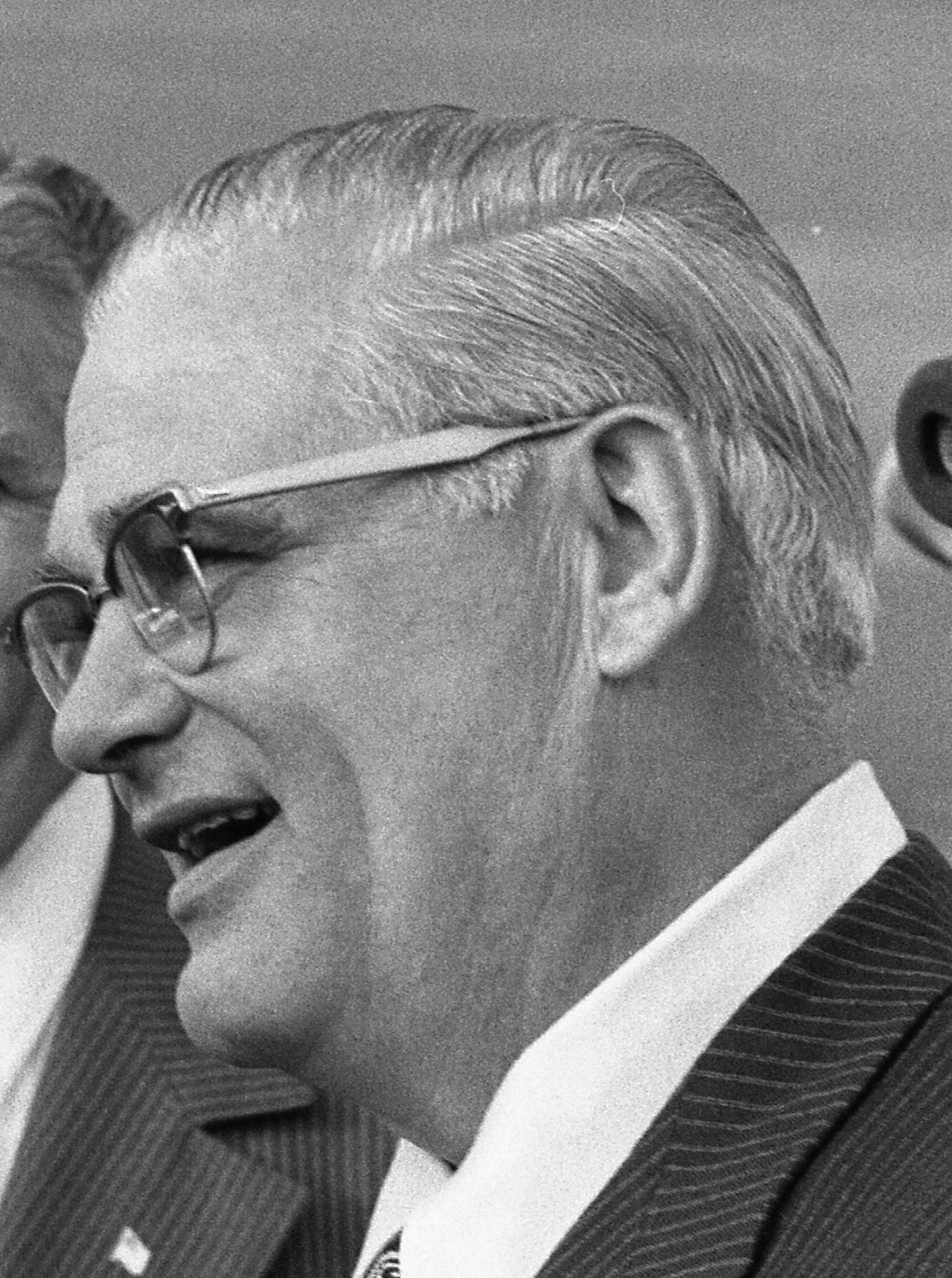
Woody Hayes head coach of Ohio State from 1951 to 1978.

One of the more famous games in the rivalry is the 1950 contest, colloquially known as the Snow Bowl. Eighth-ranked Ohio State, coached by Wes Fesler, was scheduled to host the game on November 25 in Columbus amidst one of the worst blizzards on Ohio record. The Buckeyes, who led the Big Ten, were granted the option to cancel the game against Michigan, which would have, by default, given the Buckeyes the Big Ten title outright. Ohio State refused, and the game was set to be played. Amid howling snow and wind, in a famous example of a "field position" game, the teams exchanged 45 punts, often on first down, in hopes that the other team would fumble the ball near or into their own end zone. Ohio State's Vic Janowicz, who would claim the Heisman Trophy that year, punted 21 times for 685 yards and also kicked a field goal in the first quarter for the Buckeyes' only points. Michigan capitalized on two blocked punts, booting one out of the back of the end zone for a safety and recovering another one in the end zone for a touchdown just before halftime. Despite failing to gain a single first down or complete a single forward pass, Michigan gained a 9–3 victory, securing the Big Ten title and a Rose Bowl berth. Heavy criticism of Fesler's play calling led to his resignation and the hiring of Woody Hayes as his successor.

Between 1951 and 1968 under Hayes, the Buckeyes won 12 of 18 contests, including a 1957 victory in Michigan Stadium, the first game in the series attended by over 100,000 fans. In 1958, Ohio State had a 20–14 lead towards the end of the game. On the final play, Michigan fullback Gene Sisinyak ran the ball from the one-yard line for what might have been a game-winning touchdown, but Ohio State defensive tackle Dick Schafrath hit Sisinyak, forcing a fumble. In the 1968 game, Ohio State won 50–14, outscoring its foe 29–0 in the second half and attempting an unsuccessful two-point conversion attempt on its final touchdown. In the post-game interview Hayes was asked why he went for two points with an already insurmountable 50–14 lead and he replied, "because they wouldn't let me go for three". The victory gave top-ranked Ohio State the Big Ten title for the first time in seven years en route to an AP national championship. The Buckeyes had also narrowed the series margin to 37–24–4.

=== "Ten-Year War": Hayes vs Schembechler (1969–1978) ===
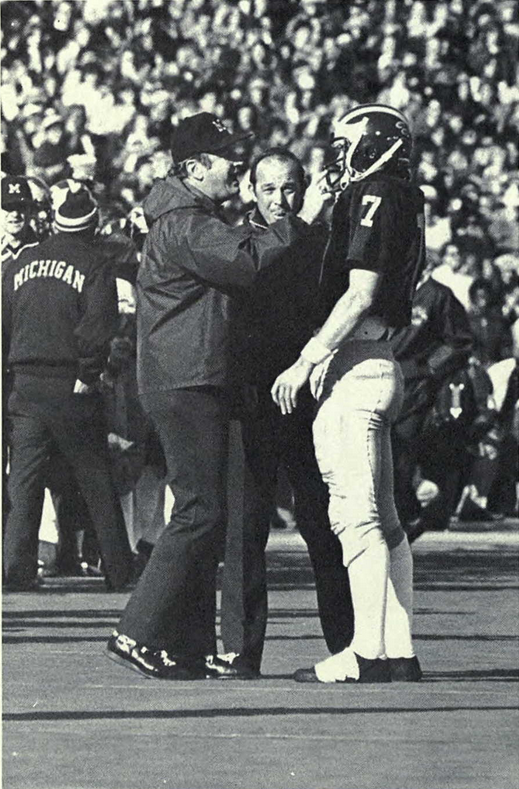
Bo Schembechler and Quarterback Rick Leach 1978.

Wolverines coach Bump Elliott resigned after the 1968 loss and Michigan hired Miami (Ohio) head coach Bo Schembechler, who had previously been an assistant coach at Ohio State under Hayes, to revitalize its football program. On November 22, 1969, Hayes led his top-ranked Buckeyes into Michigan Stadium to face Schembechler's Wolverines in the first matchup between two coaches who would come to define the rivalry between the two programs. The Buckeyes brought a 22-game winning streak into Ann Arbor, but behind an inspiring 60-yard punt return by Barry Pierson that set up a Wolverine touchdown in the second quarter, and a defense that intercepted Ohio State six times (three by Pierson), the Wolverines won a defensive battle (both teams were scoreless in the second half) for a 24–12 upset. The contest was the first in the famous "Ten-Year War" between Hayes and Schembechler, which pitted some of OSU's and UM's strongest teams against one another. Four times between 1970 and 1975, Ohio State and Michigan were both ranked in the top five of the AP Poll before their matchup. The Wolverines entered every game during those years undefeated and won only once, a 10–7 victory in Ann Arbor on November 20, 1971. The Michigan graduating class of 1975 shared or won the Big Ten championship every season, yet went to the Rose Bowl only once, in 1972. They only lost or tied with Ohio State during the regular season in that period.

In 1973, both teams entered undefeated, with the winner guaranteed a trip to the Rose Bowl. The rivals played to a 10–10 tie in Ann Arbor on November 24, and the athletic directors of the other Big Ten institutions were forced to vote on the Big Ten representative for the bowl game. In a secret ballot, Ohio State won the vote, to the outrage of Michigan athletic officials and fans. Schembechler argued that Michigan was robbed of its on-field achievements, and for months afterward, Ohio State newspapers were flooded with angry Wolverine letters and threats of lawsuits.

Hayes coined the phrase "That state up north" and "That team up north", so he would not have to say the word "Michigan". He was famous for his intense hatred of all things Michigan and according to legend, once refused to get gas in an empty tank, saying: "No, goddammit! We do NOT pull in and fill up. And I'll tell you exactly why we don't. It's because I don't buy one goddam drop of gas in the state of Michigan! We'll coast and PUSH this goddam car to the Ohio line before I give this state a nickel of my money!"

During the "Ten-Year War," Ohio State and Michigan shared the Big Ten title six times. Between 1976 and 1978, Michigan won the game each year, and Ohio State failed to score a touchdown in each of those contests.

The Schembechler-Hayes "War" ended in 1978 after Hayes was fired as a result of punching Clemson linebacker Charlie Bauman on December 29, 1978, during the Gator Bowl. The 1978 OSU-UM game was won by Michigan, 14–3, giving Schembechler a record of 5–4–1 against Hayes. At the end of Hayes' tenure, the series stood at 42–28–5.

=== Schembechler vs Bruce (1979–1987) ===
Earle Bruce took over for Hayes and led the Buckeyes to a 5–4 record against Schembechler's Wolverines between 1979 and 1987, perhaps the most balanced stretch of the rivalry, during which neither team won more than two consecutive games. In 1987, Bruce was fired in the week before the Michigan game due to a poor season record, but was allowed to coach anyway, and the inspired Buckeyes (each wearing a sweatband labeled "Earle") won an upset over the heavily favored Wolverines. After the game, Bo Schembechler told Bruce, "I always mind losing to Ohio State but I didn't mind so much today." After 1987, the series stood at 46–33–5 in favor of UM.

=== Michigan Dominance (1988–2000) ===
The 13 games during John Cooper's tenure as Buckeye coach were dominated by Michigan, as the Wolverines went 10–2–1 during the stretch. Schembechler coached Michigan through the 1989 season and then turned over the reins to one of his assistants, Gary Moeller, who led the team for five seasons before another longtime Michigan assistant, Lloyd Carr, became the head coach in 1995.

The most notorious matchups of the era took place in 1993, 1995, and 1996, in which Ohio State entered the game each year undefeated. The Buckeyes had a 9–0–1 record heading into the 1993 game and were looking to claim an outright Big Ten title against a Michigan team that had already lost four times. Michigan receiver Mercury Hayes and running backs Jon Ritchie, Che Foster, and Ed Davis each scored a touchdown as the Wolverines shocked the Buckeyes, 28–0. After the game, Cooper said: "This is one of the most embarrassing games I've ever been involved with." "They outplayed us on offense, on defense, and in the kicking game. If you'd told me we would come up here and get beat 28–0, I'd have probably stayed home."

In 1995, #2 Ohio State was led by eventual Heisman Trophy winner Eddie George and future National Football League (NFL) stars Orlando Pace, Terry Glenn, Mike Vrabel, Shawn Springs, and Rickey Dudley. Glenn insisted there wasn't anything special about the Wolverines: "Michigan's nothing," he said. Perhaps inspired by this remark, the Wolverines manhandled the Buckeyes at the line of scrimmage from the very first play. Michigan senior running back Tim Biakabutuka amassed 313 yards rushing in Michigan's 31–23 upset.

The Buckeyes had high expectations again entering the 1996 contest. They boasted an unblemished 10–0 record and were ranked No. 2 in the nation as they entered the finale with 7–3 Michigan. When Ohio State jumped to a 9–0 halftime lead, the OSU crowd sensed a special finish and perhaps a rise to No. 1. The Wolverines' defense shut the Buckeyes out in the second half while Brian Griese replaced the struggling Scott Dreisbach and led Michigan to 13 unanswered points and another victory over their rivals, 13–9. The game would turn out to be the Buckeyes' only loss of the season and ended up costing them a chance at the national championship.

In 1997, Ohio State hoped to return the favor: the 10–0 Wolverines sat atop the AP Poll entering their matchup with the 10–1 Buckeyes, who were ranked No. 4. Spearheaded by the play of eventual Heisman winner Charles Woodson, who ran a punt back for a touchdown, intercepted a pass in the Ohio State end zone, and caught a 37-yard pass that set up freshman running back Anthony Thomas' touchdown run, the Wolverines prevailed, 20–14. The Wolverines then defeated Washington State in the Rose Bowl by a 21–16 score, winning their first national championship since 1948.

Ohio State came back with a win in the 1998 contest, but Michigan went on to win in 1999 and 2000. Senior quarterback Tom Brady hit sophomore receiver Marquise Walker for the game-winning touchdown pass with five minutes to go to for a 24–17 victory in 1999. In the 2000 game, Michigan grabbed a 31–12 lead and held on to win, 38–26. Michigan junior quarterback Drew Henson went 14 for 25 passing for 303 yards and three scores and added a touchdown run. At the end of the 2000 season, Cooper was fired. While he consistently fielded strong teams, his 2–10–1 record against Michigan, including his failure to ever win in Ann Arbor, was, along with disciplinary problems and a losing record in bowl games, a major contributor to his dismissal. Michigan students held a "John Cooper Day" mock celebration in Ann Arbor on February 10, 2001, as that date in Month-Day-Year format corresponded with Cooper's record in the rivalry.

=== Enter Jim Tressel (2001–2006) ===
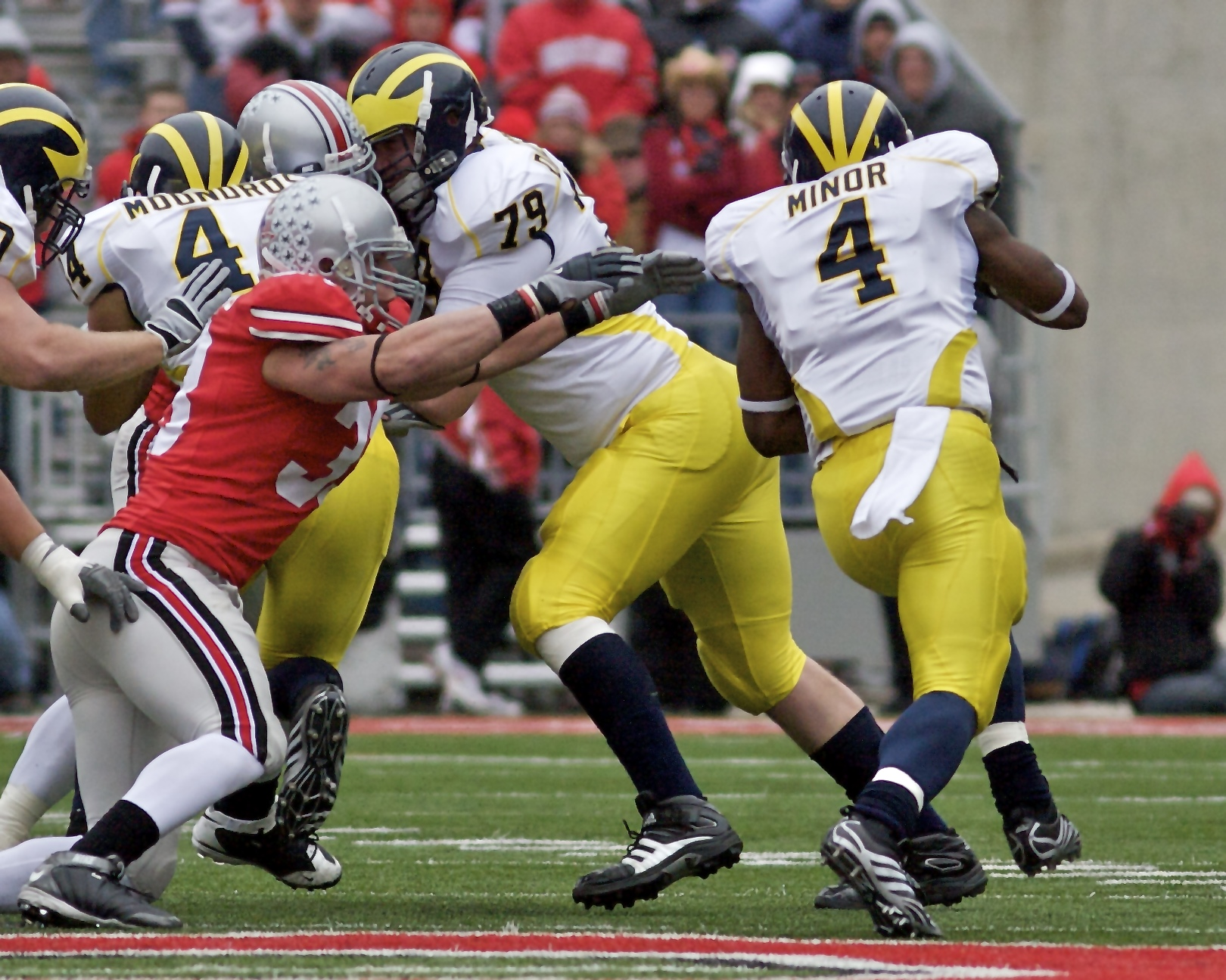
James Laurinaitis attempts to tackle Brandon Minor.

In 2001, Youngstown State head football coach Jim Tressel took over as Buckeye head coach. Unlike his predecessor John Cooper, Tressel put a special emphasis on the rivalry. In his introductory speech at halftime of a January basketball game, against Michigan, he said "I can assure you that you will be proud of our young people, in the classroom, in the community, and most especially in 310 days in Ann Arbor, Michigan on the football field." In his first year, Tressel registered the Buckeyes' first defeat of the Wolverines in Ann Arbor in 14 years, by a 26–20 score. Led by senior running back Jonathan Wells, the Buckeyes raced to a 23–0 halftime lead. With Wells out, Michigan mounted a second half comeback that fell just short. The next year, Tressel achieved what Cooper could not: Beating Michigan in consecutive years with a 14–9 victory. The game was decided on the last play when defensive back Will Allen intercepted a pass at the two yard line as time expired to clinch the victory. The Buckeyes were led by freshman running back Maurice Clarett, who ran for 119 yards and one touchdown. He also had a key reception to set up Maurice Hall's game-winning score. The Buckeyes went on to win the national championship that season, as they defeated Miami in the Fiesta Bowl.

In 2003, Michigan struck back and won the 100th meeting between the historical rivals by a score of 35–21 in Ann Arbor. Senior running back Chris Perry, a Heisman finalist, had 154 yards rushing and two touchdowns to lead the Wolverines to the victory. Braylon Edwards contributed seven catches for 130 yards and two big touchdowns. The game's attendance was 112,118, the largest crowd ever for an NCAA football game at the time. In 2004, the 6–4 Buckeyes defeated the heavily favored 10–1 Wolverines, 37–21, behind the leadership of quarterback Troy Smith and true freshman receiver Ted Ginn Jr. The Buckeyes added another win in the 2005 game by overcoming a 21–12 deficit with less than eight minutes in the game. In the closing minutes of the game, the Buckeye offense scored two touchdowns to claim a 25–21 victory. Smith threw for 300 yards and completed 73% of his passes. Ginn had a game high nine catches for 89 yards.

==== 2006: Game of The Century ====
Game of the Century (in 2006)
Michigan Wolverines	Ohio State Buckeyes
(11–0)	(11–0)
39	42
Head coach: Lloyd Carr	Head coach: Jim Tressel
AP / Coaches / BCS; 2 / 2 / 2	AP / Coaches / BCS; 1 / 1 / 1
	1	2	3	4	Total
Michigan	7	7	10	15	39
Ohio State	7	21	7	7	42
- Date: November 18, 2006
- Season: 2006
- Stadium: Ohio Stadium
- Location: Columbus, Ohio

On November 18, 2006, Ohio State and Michigan met for their annual showdown, each carrying an 11–0 record. For the first time in the history of the rivalry, the two teams faced off while holding the top two spots in the Bowl Championship Series rankings. The game gained more significance when, on the eve of the meeting, longtime Michigan head coach and former Ohio State assistant coach Bo Schembechler died. Schembechler was honored with a video tribute at Ohio Stadium as well as a moment of silence before kickoff. Michigan struck first with a touchdown run by junior running back Mike Hart, but the Buckeyes then scored 21 unanswered points, and at halftime, they were up 28–14. Thanks to an interception and a fumble recovery by junior defensive tackle Alan Branch, Michigan cut Ohio State's lead to 35–31 early in the fourth quarter. But after appearing to have forced Ohio State into a fourth-down with six minutes to go, Michigan linebacker Shawn Crable was called for roughing the passer, giving the Buckeyes a fresh set of downs. Ohio State quarterback Troy Smith then found Brian Robiskie for a touchdown, increasing the Buckeyes' lead to 42–31 with five minutes remaining in the game. After Ohio State was called for pass interference on a failed fourth-down attempt, giving Michigan an automatic first down, quarterback Chad Henne found tight end Tyler Ecker for a 16-yard touchdown with two minutes to go to cut the OSU lead to 42–37. Wide receiver Steve Breaston caught the two-point conversion to bring the Wolverines within a field goal. Michigan failed to recover the ensuing onside kick allowing Ohio State to run out the clock for the 42–39 victory and a trip to the BCS national championship game. Smith completed 71% of his passes for 316 yards and four touchdowns, essentially clinching the Heisman trophy. Ginn caught eight passes for 104 yards and a touchdown. Ohio State running back Antonio Pittman ran for 139 yards on 18 carries for a 7.7 yards-per-carry average. Michigan running back Mike Hart carried the ball 23 times for 142 yards and three touchdowns against a stout Buckeyes defense. Henne had 267 yards and two touchdowns on a 60% completion percentage. Neither performance was, however, sufficient to turn the tide in favor of the Wolverines. The game was highly touted by ESPN/ABC (there was a game countdown clock for a week before kickoff) and was viewed by the largest television audience for a regular-season college football game since 1993, averaging 21.8 million viewers. The victory marked the first time in 43 years that the Buckeyes had won three consecutive games in the series.

Half an hour after the game ended, the Ohio Lottery PICK 4 evening drawing was 4–2–3–9, matching the final score of the game and paying out up to $5,000 per winner, for a total payout of $2.2 million.

Following the game, there was a chance of a rematch in the 2007 BCS National Championship Game; Florida was instead chosen over Michigan to be Ohio State's opponent while Michigan faced USC in the 2007 Rose Bowl. Both teams ended the season with a loss, with Florida winning the National Championship and USC winning the Rose Bowl.

=== A carousel of coaches (2007–2011) ===
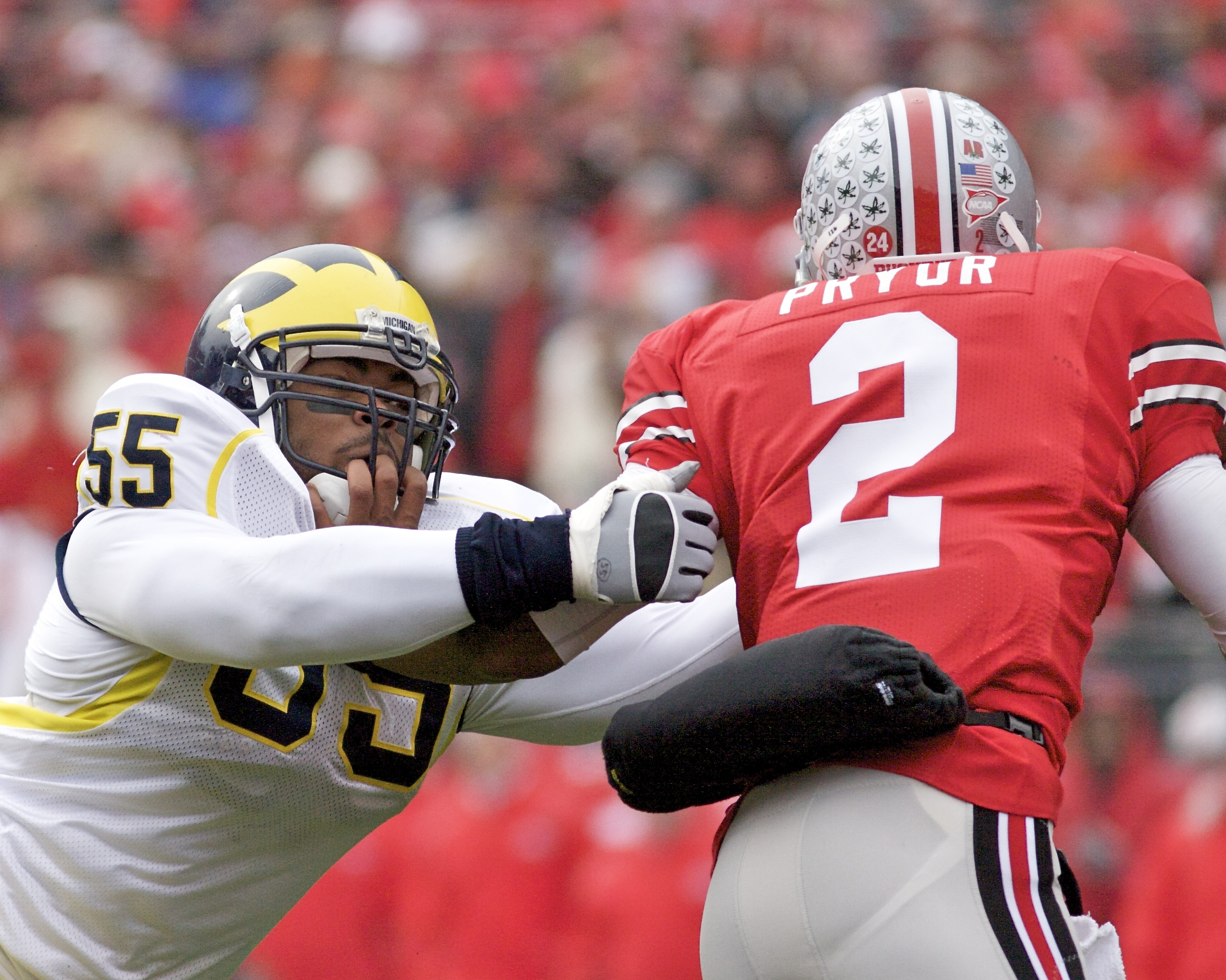
Terrelle Pryor (right) eludes Brandon Graham with a stiff arm.

Lloyd Carr retired as coach at Michigan following the 2007 season, which included another loss to Ohio State. Tressel had compiled a 6–1 record against Carr's Michigan teams, leaving Carr with a 6–7 career record against the Buckeyes. In December 2007, Michigan hired West Virginia head coach Rich Rodriguez to take over the football program. Furthermore, both Carr and his predecessor Gary Moeller had been apprenticed by the now-legendary Schembechler, and Rodriguez's hiring marked the first time in 40 years that a Michigan football team would not be coached by a member of the "Woody Hayes coaching tree".

The 2008 game, Rodriguez's first against the Buckeyes, featured an Ohio State team that needed a win to secure at least a share of the Big Ten championship for the fourth straight year. Michigan by contrast entered the game with a 3–8 record, having already suffered more losses than in any other season in its history. The Buckeyes posted a 42–7 win, and scored their largest margin of victory over Michigan since 1968.

Ohio State won 21–10 in the 2009 game to extend their winning streak against Michigan to six games, their longest in the rivalry's history, and improve Tressel's record versus Michigan to 8–1. Ohio State wore throwback uniforms to commemorate their 1954 national championship team. The 2009 meeting also saw Buckeye guard Justin Boren, who had transferred from Michigan in 2008, become the third player in school history to play for both teams, joining J. T. White and Howard Yerges Jr. and only the second to play for both teams in the rivalry game. In 2010, Ohio State again prevailed, 37–7 but later had to vacate all wins from the 2010 season.

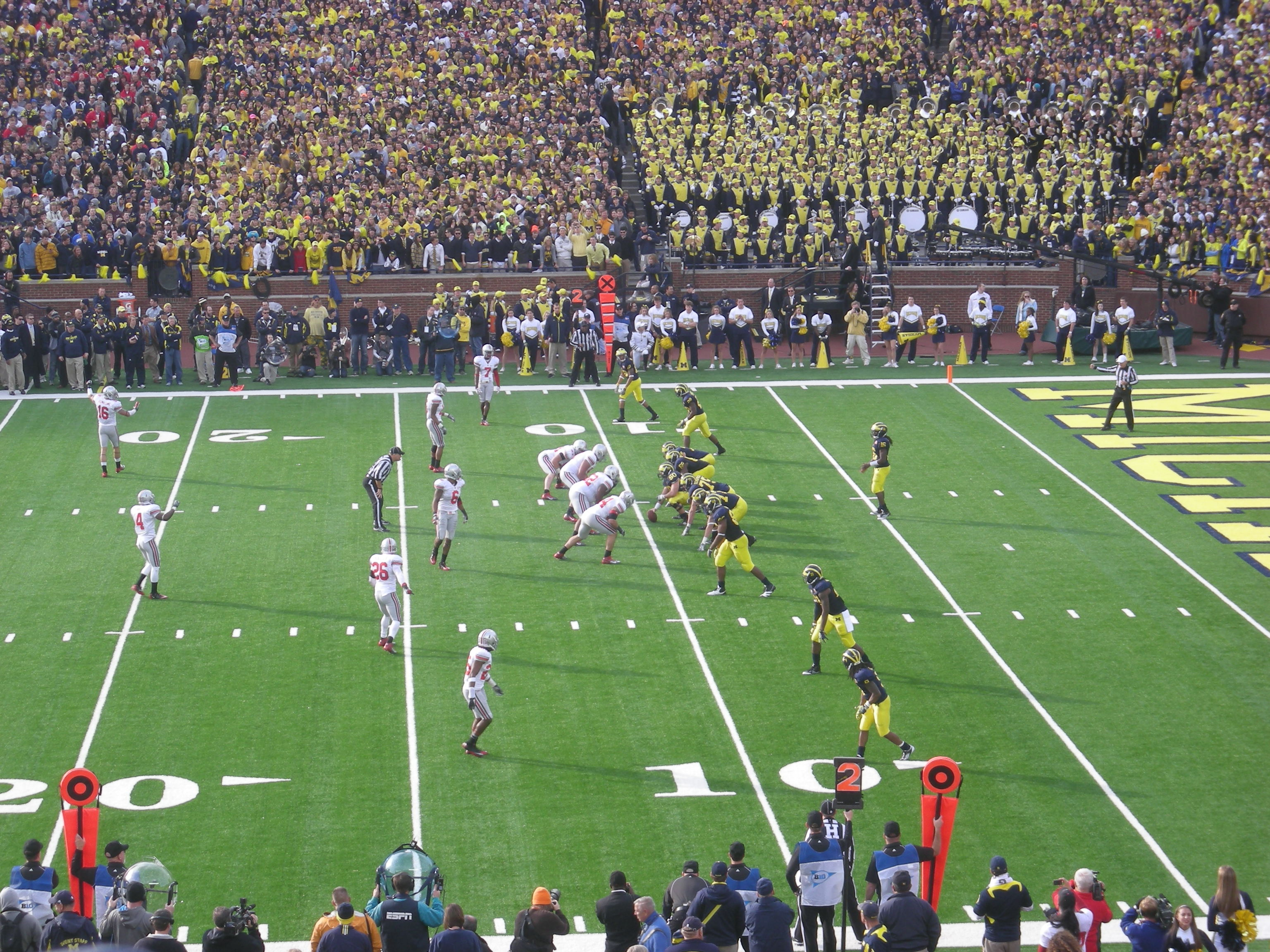
Michigan on offense against Ohio State during the 2011 game in Ann Arbor.

Rodriguez was fired following the 2010 season. He was succeeded by Brady Hoke, who served as Michigan's defensive line coach from 1995 to 2002. Meanwhile, the Ohio State football program came under NCAA investigation in early 2011 for an incident in which several prominent players were discovered to have traded memorabilia for tattoos. Evidence surfaced that Tressel had known about the situation but had not reported it to school compliance officials, and that the abuses were more widespread and longstanding than originally reported. On May 30, 2011, Tressel resigned as head coach and former Buckeye player and assistant coach Luke Fickell was appointed interim head coach for the 2011 season. In response to the ongoing NCAA investigation, Ohio State vacated all wins from the 2010 season, including the win over Michigan, leaving Tressel with a final record against Michigan of 8–1.

Michigan won the 2011 meeting, 40–34, which was the first between two first-year coaches since the 1929 match-up of Harry Kipke and Sam Willaman. The Wolverines were led by junior quarterback Denard Robinson who accounted for 337 total yards rushing and passing, and five touchdowns.

On November 28, 2011, Urban Meyer, who had served as a graduate assistant at Ohio State from 1986 to 1987, was named the 24th head coach for the Buckeyes, replacing Fickell.

=== Urban Meyer's 7-0 run (2012–2018) ===
In the 2012 matchup, OSU's junior running back Carlos Hyde ran for 146 yards and the fourth-ranked Buckeyes, trailing at halftime, shut down No. 20 Michigan's offense in the second half to prevail 26–21 and cap a 12–0 season.

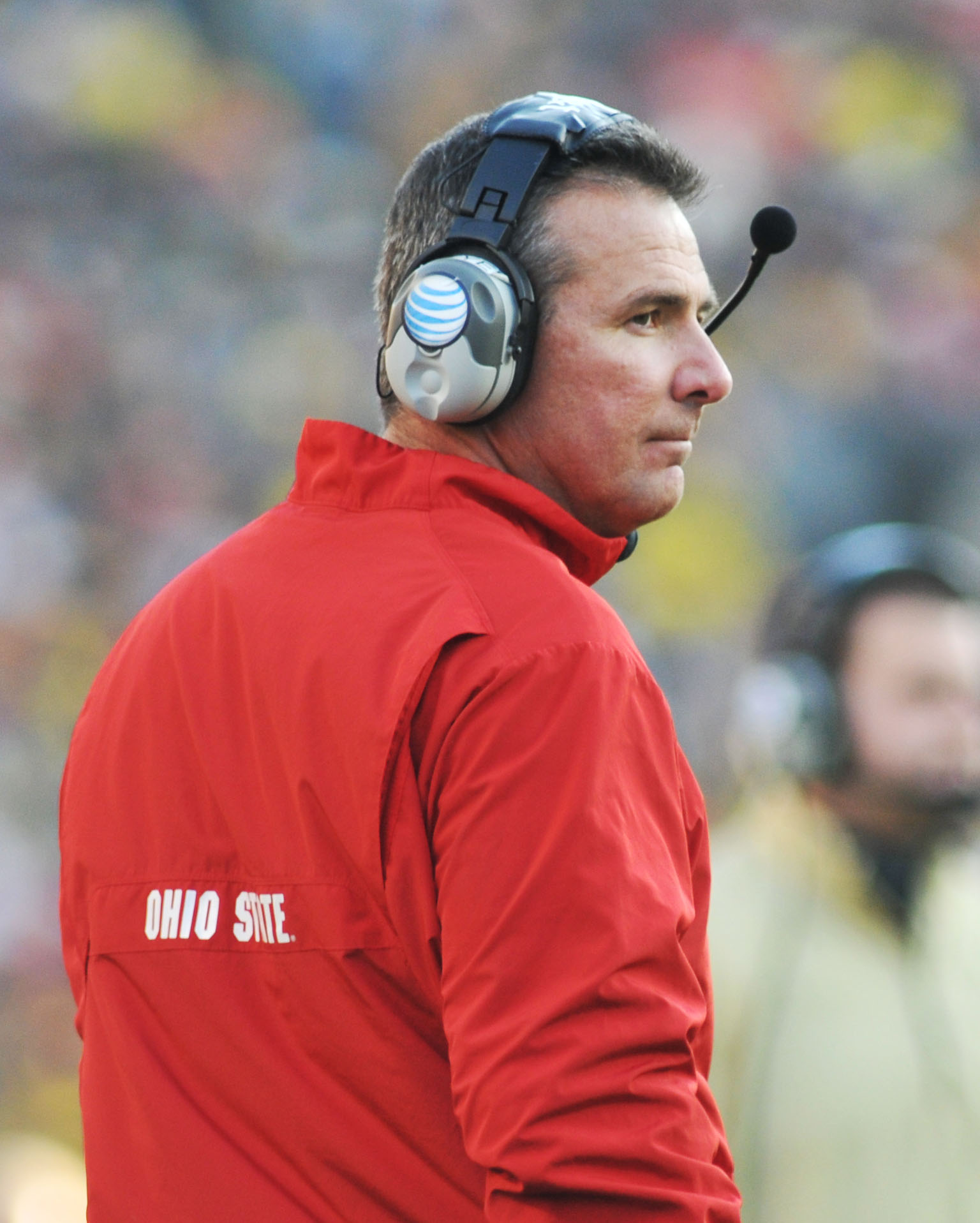
Urban Meyer vs Michigan 2013.

In 2013, Ohio State came to Michigan Stadium with an 11–0 record (7–0 Big Ten) and ranked No. 3 in the BCS standings. Michigan was a disappointing 7–4 (3–4 Big Ten). In spite of the seeming mismatch, the game remained close and with 32 seconds remaining Michigan scored to bring the score to 42–41. Michigan attempted a two-point conversion for the lead, but Devin Gardner's pass was intercepted in the end zone by Tyvis Powell, and Ohio State escaped with the win. The Wolverines lost despite piling up 603 yards of offense, including 451 passing yards from Devin Gardner. The game is also notable for a fight that broke out on the field during the second quarter, in which punches were thrown and both benches cleared. One Michigan player (Royce-Jenkins Stone), and two Ohio State players (Dontre Wilson and Marcus Hall), were all ejected from the game for fighting. As Hall was escorted to the locker room, he double flipped the crowd on his way out, drawing ire in the process.

Michigan entered the 2014 contest with a 5–6 record and needed a win against Ohio State to become bowl eligible. Ohio State had a 10–1 record (7–0 in the Big Ten), and was holding onto hope that they would be selected as one of the top four teams in the nation and gain a spot in the first ever College Football Playoff. The game was tied at 21 until the fourth quarter when Ohio State scored three touchdowns to go up 42–21. The game ended 42–28. During the contest, OSU quarterback J. T. Barrett suffered a broken ankle and left the game in favor of third-string sophomore quarterback, Cardale Jones. Three days after the game, Michigan head coach Brady Hoke was fired. On December 30, former Michigan quarterback Jim Harbaugh was introduced as Michigan's new head football coach.

The 2015 game in Ann Arbor marked Harbaugh's first game as a head coach in the rivalry. His Michigan team was ranked No. 10 with a record of 9–2 coming into the game and Ohio State was 10–1, ranked no. 8 The first half was close, with Michigan scoring a touchdown shortly before halftime to narrow Ohio State's lead to 14–10. Ohio State, however, scored touchdowns on each of its first four possessions in the second half, while Michigan could only score a single field goal. The final score was 42–13, in favor of Ohio State.

The 2016 game pitted the third-ranked Wolverines against the second-ranked Buckeyes, only the second time that the matchup featured programs both ranked in the nation's top three. Michigan led 10–7 at halftime and extended its lead to 17–7 early in the third quarter. An Ohio State touchdown cut the deficit to 17–14 heading to the fourth quarter. The Buckeyes kicked a field goal in the final seconds of regulation to tie the game and force overtime. The game marked the first overtime in the series between the two teams. Ohio State defeated Michigan for the fifth consecutive time, winning 30–27 in two overtimes. However, significant controversy emerged over a critical fourth down spot in double overtime. Ohio State quarterback J.T. Barrett kept the ball on a 4th and 1 play. He was tackled almost exactly on the line to gain, and the ensuing spot gave Barrett a first down. Had he not been given the first down, the game would have ended and Michigan would have won. Whether or not Barrett reached the line is a heavily contested question, and one that remains a point of contention between fans of both teams to this day. Also, had Michigan won, Penn State wouldn't have gone to the Big Ten Championship as they had lost to Michigan and were relying on an Ohio State victory over Michigan to get to Indianapolis (Penn State had upset then-second-ranked Ohio State 24–21 on October 22).

The 2017 game, held in Ann Arbor, drew a crowd of more than 112,000, and featured the no. 9 Buckeyes against the unranked Wolverines. Michigan led 14–0 at the end of the first quarter but Ohio State tied the game at 14–14 before halftime. Michigan's offense was limited to six points in the second half, and Ohio State scored 17, winning the game 31–20. The victory was the Buckeyes' sixth win in six years under head coach Urban Meyer. J.T. Barrett, Ohio State's starting quarterback, recorded 4 wins in 4 years as a starting quarterback—the first Ohio State QB to do so. Until this game, Ohio State had never come back and won a game against Michigan once down 14 or more points.

In 2018, the no. 4 Wolverines visited the no. 10 Buckeyes in a game with both Big Ten Championship and College Football Playoff implications. Michigan entered the game with the best statistical defense in the country, but Ohio State gained more than 560 yards – including six touchdown passes – en route to a dominant 62–39 victory. Ohio State's 62 points set a record for points against Michigan during regulation, and the victory improved Meyer's Ohio State teams' record against Michigan to 7–0. Harbaugh fell to 0–4 against Ohio State, making him the first Michigan coach to lose his first four starts against the Buckeyes. The 2018 meeting was Meyer's last against Michigan, as he announced his retirement at the end of the season.

=== Present day and national titles (2019–present) ===
The 2019 game matched #1 Ohio State at #13 Michigan. This was the Buckeyes' first full season under new head coach Ryan Day, who took over the program following the retirement of Meyer. Day previously served as the offensive coordinator under Meyer. Undefeated Ohio State came into the game favored by nine and aimed to win their eighth straight game in the series, the longest in Ohio State's history and the second longest in the series. Behind over 300 passing yards from Justin Fields and 200 yards rushing from J. K. Dobbins, and 4 touchdowns from each player, Ohio State cruised to a 56–27 victory. Following the loss, Harbaugh faced tough questions from the press after he became the first coach to go 0–5 in the series, and second after the Buckeyes' John Cooper (0–4–1) to go winless in his first five games. When asked about the gap between the two schools, his reply was described as testy by multiple sources: "I'll answer your questions, not your insults."

On December 8, 2020, Michigan canceled the game against Ohio State, citing "an increasing number of positive COVID-19 cases and student-athletes in quarantine over the past week". It was the first time the game was not played since 1917. Jim Harbaugh's job status and Ohio State needing one more game played to be eligible for the Big Ten Championship Game led to speculation of a planned cancellation. However, Michigan canceled its games both before and after the Ohio State game due to COVID-19 cases.

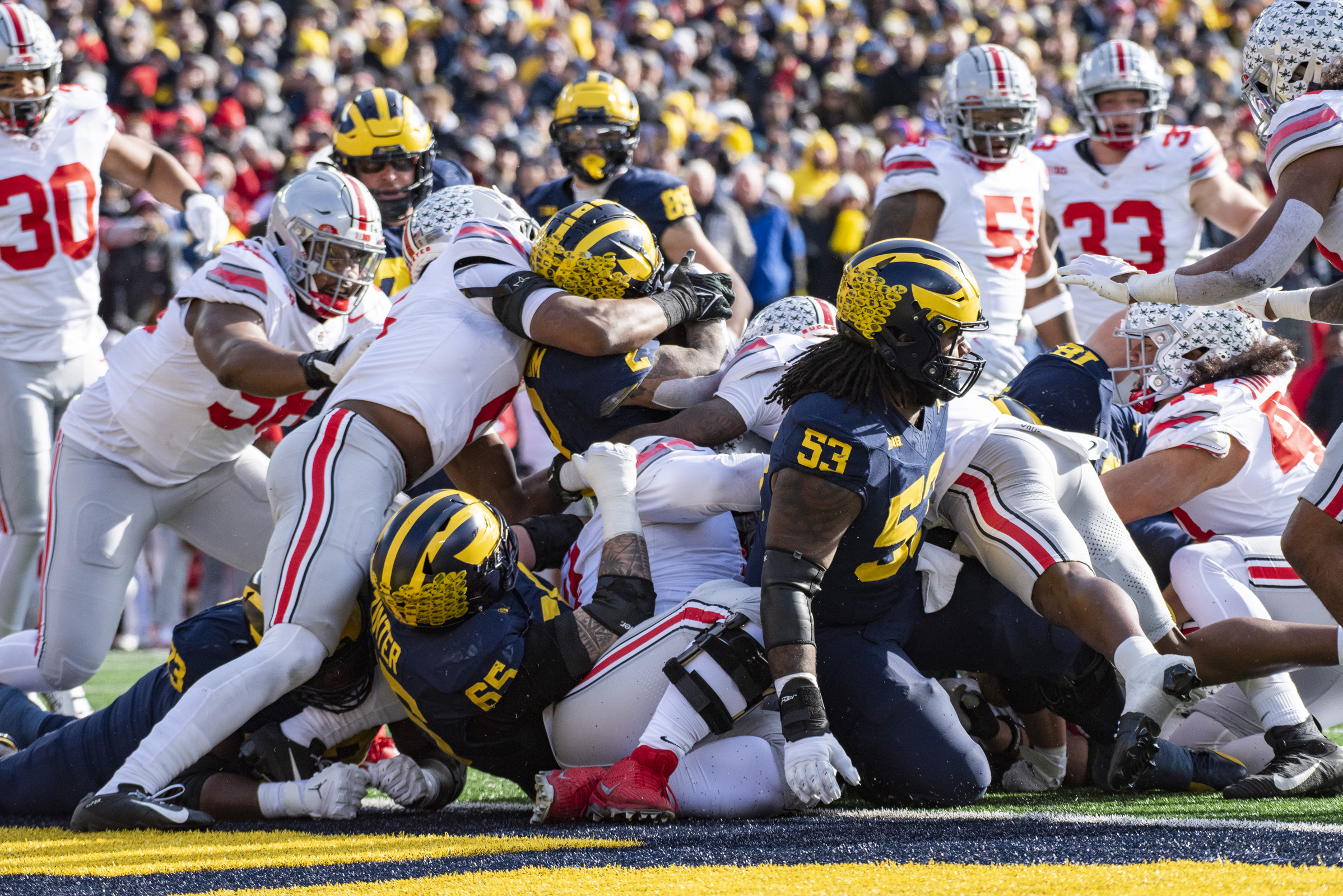
A play at the goal line during the 2023 game.

In 2021, the game between No. 2 Ohio State and No. 5 Michigan in Ann Arbor was the 12th time in the rivalry's history that both teams were ranked in the top five. Michigan won the game 42–27. Senior running back Hassan Haskins scored five touchdowns in the game, a record for any running back in the rivalry's history and tied for most in a single game in school history. Senior defensive end Aidan Hutchinson had 3 sacks, giving him a school record of 13 sacks on the season and propelling him into the Heisman race. The result ended Michigan's 8-game losing streak against Ohio State and gave coach Jim Harbaugh his first win against Ohio State in six tries. The game led Michigan to clinch their first-ever Big Ten Championship Game appearance, in which they won the Big Ten Conference for the first time since 2004, and their first outright conference championship since 2003. In 2022, Michigan and Ohio State again entered the game with high preseason expectations, they found themselves dominating their schedules. Both No. 2 Ohio State and No. 3 Michigan entered the game undefeated for the first time since 2006, with the teams fighting for a spot in the Big Ten Championship Game. While Ohio State had a 20–17 lead at halftime, Michigan took control of the game in the second half, outscoring the Buckeyes 28–3 to post a 45–23 win; their first in Columbus since 2000. Michigan clinched its first undefeated regular season since 1997. Michigan quarterback J. J. McCarthy finished the game with 263 passing yards, three passing touchdowns, and a rushing touchdown. Running back Donovan Edwards added 218 rushing yards and two touchdowns on 22 carries. Ohio State wide receivers Egbuka and Harrison posted 125 and 120 receiving yards in the defeat. This game drew in an average of 17 million viewers and peaked at 19.6 million, making it the highest-viewed regular-season college football game since 2011, and the highest-viewed college football broadcast in Fox Sports network history.

In 2023, both teams came in undefeated for the second consecutive season. No. 3 Michigan was without coach Harbaugh after receiving a three-game suspension imposed by the Big Ten in response to an ongoing NCAA investigation for alleged sign-stealing and impermissible scouting operation by a junior member of the coaching staff. Sherrone Moore was the acting head coach for this game. Michigan won, 30–24. This marked the first three-game win streak for Michigan in the rivalry since 1995 to 1997. Following the game, Michigan went on to finish with a perfect 15-0 record and win the program's first national championship since 1997. The 2023 matchup drew viewership surpassing its record-breaking audience from the previous season, averaging over 19.1 million and peaking at 22.9 million.

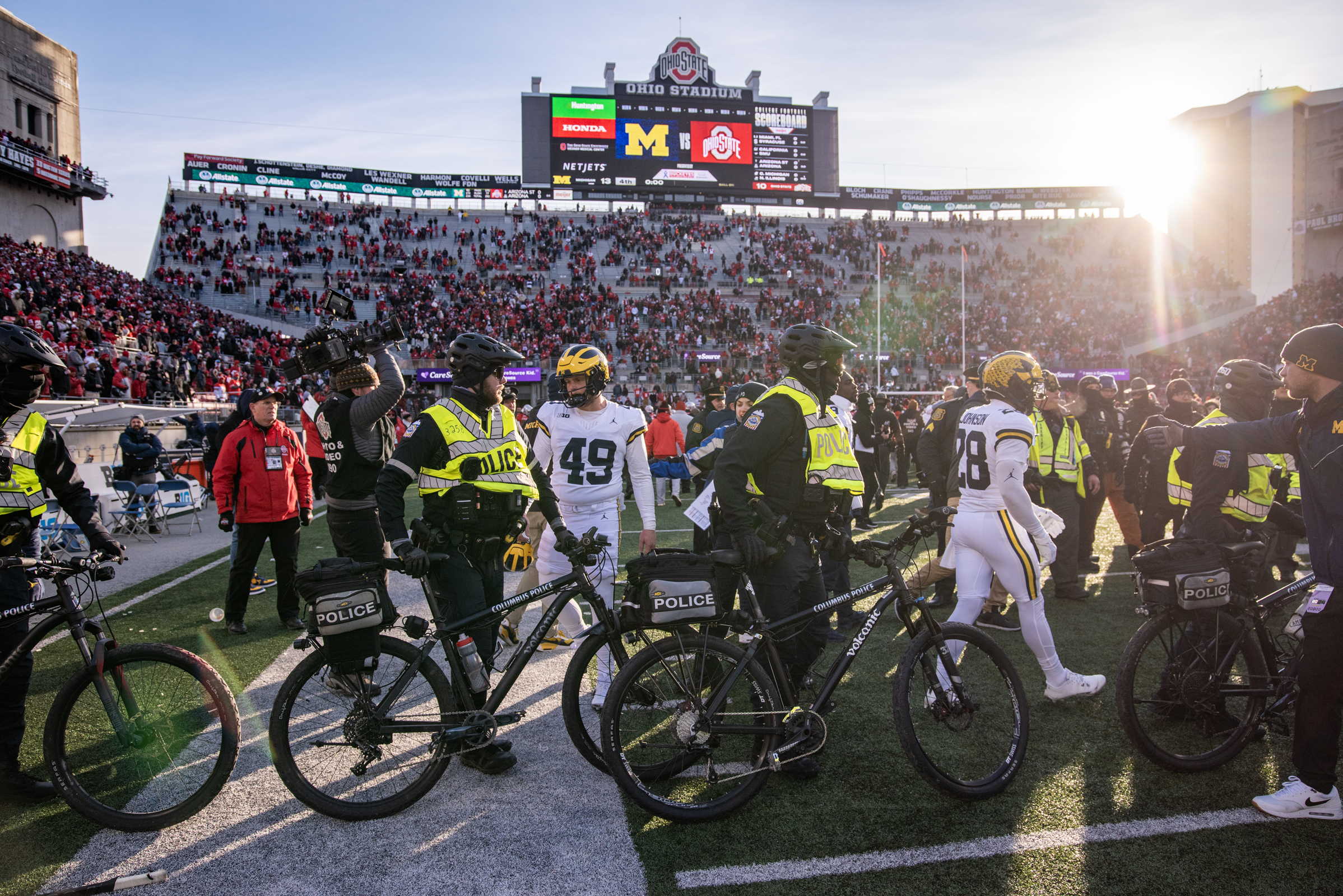
Columbus Police take the field at Ohio Stadium following the postgame fight in 2024.

In 2024, Michigan saw the departure Harbaugh to the NFL's Los Angeles Chargers, along with several key players and coaches. Moore, who served as Michigan's acting head coach for the 2023 matchup, was hired as their full-time head coach. Despite starting the season ranked No. 9, Michigan was unable to replicate its success from previous years, eventually falling out of the top 25 and entering the matchup 6–5. Meanwhile, Ohio State saw similar success as to previous seasons, as the Buckeyes entered the game 10–1 and ranked No. 2 for a fourth game in a row in the series, led by transfer quarterback Will Howard. Despite entering the game as 20.5-point underdogs, Michigan outlasted Ohio State, 13–10. Both quarterbacks threw two interceptions each and Ohio State missed two field goals, wide left and right. Michigan kicked the eventual game-winning field goal with 45 seconds left in the game, defeating Ohio State for the fourth-straight year and denying Ohio State a spot in the Big Ten Championship Game for the fourth-straight year as well. It was the largest upset in the series history. The victory extended Michigan's winning streak to four straight games, the first for Michigan since 1988 to 1991. It was Michigan's first victory over Ohio State while unranked since 1993, and their first victory over Ohio State in Columbus while unranked since 1966. Despite the loss, Ohio State would qualify for an at-large bid in the College Football Playoff and go on to win the national championship, marking the first time ever that the two rivals won a national championship in back-to-back years much like 2017 Alabama.

After the game, a fight broke out between the two teams after Michigan players ran to the Ohio State's 50 yard line and planted their team flag on the Ohio State logo at midfield, and Buckeyes players pursued the Wolverines from the student-section end zone. The skirmish ended with a few players and coaches bloodied and several players having been pepper sprayed by members of law enforcement. Officers from both Michigan and Ohio intervened to prevent the fighting from escalating, including sheriffs, deputies, state troopers, university police from both schools and local police from Ann Arbor and Columbus that were serving as security at the game. The following day, the Big Ten Conference levied $100,000 institutional fines against both universities for violating the conference's sportsmanship policy. Ohio State went on to win the 2024 national championship in the College Football Playoffs.

In 2025, the two teams met in Ann Arbor, with Ohio State undefeated at 11–0 and ranked No. 1, and Michigan ranked No. 15 with a 9–2 record. A win would put Michigan in position to potentially earn an at-large bid in the College Football Playoff. Ohio State defeated Michigan, 27–9, earning their first win in the rivalry since 2019 ending their four game losing streak in the series. Ohio State quarterback Julian Sayin finished the game with 19 completions, 233 passing yards, and three passing touchdowns. With the win, the Buckeyes achieved a perfect regular season and clinched a spot in the Big Ten Championship Game for the first time in five years. After the game when asked how the team would cherish the moment, Day stated, "They would do so with Humility." Day also said, "It was cool to hear Ohio State's fans chant "O-H-I-O" in the Big House like old times." During the game, Brutus Buckeye crossed out the M in one of the snow-covered Michigan end zones and then wrote "Ohio" in cursive. The Michigan Stadium grounds crew eventually erased what Brutus had done.

== Big Ten expansion ==
Big Ten map (2024–present).

In 2010, the Big Ten Conference announced that the University of Nebraska would be joining the Big Ten the following year, and that the Big Ten would be split into two divisions. When rumors surfaced that Ohio State and Michigan would be placed in different divisions, concerns arose that the teams might no longer play the last game of the regular season to avoid potential back-to-back games if each team won their division and earned the right to play in the Big Ten Championship Game. Fans bombarded the athletic directors of both schools, as well as the Big Ten commissioner with emails, creating pressure to keep The Game as the regular-season finale. Ultimately, Michigan was placed in the Legends Division and Ohio State in the Leaders Division. The Michigan–Ohio State game became a "protected crossover" game, to be played every year at the end of the regular season.

The game became a divisional matchup under the Big Ten's geographical realignment in 2014, with Michigan and Ohio State both placed in the East Division.

In 2023, the Big Ten Conference announced the removal of the divisional format beginning with the 2024 season. The Michigan-Ohio State contest will be one of eleven annually protected rivalry games under the conference's new "Flex Protect Model". Additionally, as from 2024 onward the Big Ten Championship Game will now feature the top two teams in the conference, there is the possibility for Ohio State and Michigan to play each other in back-to-back weeks if both qualify for the championship game.

== In popular culture ==
During the mid-2000s, ESPN aired several commercials describing certain situations that would be "normal, if it wasn't for sports". One commercial featured a man in an Ohio State shirt making out with a woman wearing a Michigan shirt. An ESPNU commercial air portrayed a couple on a blind date that appears to be successful until it becomes clear that she is from Michigan and he is a fan of Ohio State.

A fictional version of the 2002 matchup serves as the backdrop for the second episode of 8 Simple Rules, "Wall of Shame." Paul Hennessey (John Ritter), a Michigan fan, is frustrated by a series of continuous interruptions causing him to miss most of the game, having commented before kickoff that football is like a religion and the day of the rivalry game against Ohio State is equivalent to Easter.

In 2006, as part of their "Midwest Midterm Midtacular", The Daily Show visited Ohio State University and made fun of the rivalry on the final night by having correspondent Rob Riggle report while wearing a Michigan sweatshirt. This brought boos, jeers, and a few laughs from the Ohio State audience. After the sketch was over, Jon Stewart compared the rivalry to the disputes between Sunni and Shiite Muslims.

The 2007 HBO documentary Michigan vs. Ohio State: The Rivalry focused on the rivalry, chiefly the "Ten-Year War" to the present, as of 2007.

The book Myth Directions by Robert Asprin, who attended Michigan, features a thinly veiled version of the Ohio State vs. Michigan game, parodying both sides and their fanaticism regarding the event.

The 1942 movie The Male Animal, based on a play of the same name by Ohio State alumni James Thurber and Elliott Nugent, also features a version of the game.

In 2011, 10-year-old Grant Reed of Columbus was diagnosed with a malignant brain tumor. Not liking to use the word "cancer", Reed (whose parents are both Ohio State alums and was himself an Ohio State fan) decided to call his cancer "Michigan", since "Ohio State is always going to beat Michigan". This won the support of the boy's parents, Ohio State head coach Urban Meyer (who Reed later got to meet), and even some Michigan fans, including Michigan head coach Brady Hoke. After his last chemotherapy treatment in 2013, which placed him in remission, Reed told people that he "beat Michigan". When Reed died on February 10, 2019, his father posted on Facebook that "Grant won his final victory over 'M*CH*G*N' because it can never hurt him again."

The rivalry is featured in the RIVALS documentary series produced by the Sinclair Broadcast Group.

In November 2026, then-candidate for the United States Senate and Michigan alumnus Abdul El-Sayed referenced the rivalry against Vice President JD Vance (who attended Ohio State) during an election night speech, saying “JD, Habibi, there is this delicious irony in the fact that you’re constitutionally obligated to swear me in in January... So, you know what that means. Wolverine: 1, Buckeye: 0.”

== Accomplishments by the two rivals ==
Team	Michigan	Ohio State
National titles	12	9
CFP appearances	3	6
Bowl appearances	53	59
Postseason bowl record	24–29	29–29
Rose Bowl wins	9	10
Rose Bowl appearances	21	17
Big Ten titles	45	39
Big Ten divisional titles	4	10
Consensus All-Americans	88	93
Heisman Trophies	3	7
All-time program record	1012–358–36	978–335–53
All-time win percentage	.733	.735

As of December 2, 2025, Michigan is number one and Ohio State is number two on the list of the college football teams with the most total wins, and Ohio State is number one and Michigan is number two on the list of college football teams with the highest winning percentage. And for most Rose Bowls, Ohio State and Michigan place second and third behind USC.

== Game results ==
Rankings prior to 2014 are from the AP Poll. Rankings from 2014 and thereafter are from the College Football Playoff rankings.

Michigan victories	Ohio State victories	Tie games	†* Vacated victories

No.	Date	Location	Winning team		Losing team	
1	October 16, 1897	Ann Arbor	Michigan	34	Ohio State	0
2	November 24, 1900	Ann Arbor	Tie	0	Tie	0
3	November 9, 1901	Columbus	Michigan	21	Ohio State	0
4	October 25, 1902	Ann Arbor	Michigan	86	Ohio State	0
5	November 7, 1903	Ann Arbor	Michigan	36	Ohio State	0
6	October 15, 1904	Columbus	Michigan	31	Ohio State	6
7	November 11, 1905	Ann Arbor	Michigan	40	Ohio State	0
8	October 20, 1906	Columbus	Michigan	6	Ohio State	0
9	October 26, 1907	Ann Arbor	Michigan	22	Ohio State	0
10	October 24, 1908	Columbus	Michigan	10	Ohio State	6
11	October 16, 1909	Ann Arbor	Michigan	33	Ohio State	6
12	October 22, 1910	Columbus	Tie	3	Tie	3
13	October 21, 1911	Ann Arbor	Michigan	19	Ohio State	0
14	October 19, 1912	Columbus	Michigan	14	Ohio State	0
15	November 30, 1918	Columbus	Michigan	14	Ohio State	0
16	October 25, 1919	Ann Arbor	Ohio State	13	Michigan	3
17	November 6, 1920	Columbus	Ohio State	14	Michigan	7
18	October 22, 1921	Ann Arbor	Ohio State	14	Michigan	0
19	October 21, 1922	Columbus	Michigan	19	Ohio State	0
20	October 20, 1923	Ann Arbor	Michigan	23	Ohio State	0
21	November 15, 1924	Columbus	Michigan	16	Ohio State	6
22	November 14, 1925	Ann Arbor	Michigan	10	Ohio State	0
23	November 13, 1926	Columbus	Michigan	17	Ohio State	16
24	October 22, 1927	Ann Arbor	Michigan	21	Ohio State	0
25	October 20, 1928	Columbus	Ohio State	19	Michigan	7
26	October 19, 1929	Ann Arbor	Ohio State	7	Michigan	0
27	October 18, 1930	Columbus	Michigan	13	Ohio State	0
28	October 17, 1931	Ann Arbor	Ohio State	7	Michigan	0
29	October 15, 1932	Columbus	Michigan	14	Ohio State	0
30	October 21, 1933	Ann Arbor	Michigan	13	Ohio State	0
31	November 17, 1934	Columbus	Ohio State	34	Michigan	0
32	November 23, 1935	Ann Arbor	Ohio State	38	Michigan	0
33	November 21, 1936	Columbus	No. 18 Ohio State	21	Michigan	0
34	November 20, 1937	Ann Arbor	No. 19 Ohio State	21	Michigan	0
35	November 19, 1938	Columbus	No. 17 Michigan	18	Ohio State	0
36	November 25, 1939	Ann Arbor	No. 25 Michigan	21	No. 6 Ohio State	14
37	November 23, 1940	Columbus	No. 7 Michigan	40	Ohio State	0
38	November 22, 1941	Ann Arbor	Tie	20	Tie	20
39	November 21, 1942	Columbus	No. 5 Ohio State	21	No. 4 Michigan	7
40	November 20, 1943	Ann Arbor	No. 4 Michigan	45	Ohio State	7
41	November 25, 1944	Columbus	No. 3 Ohio State	18	No. 6 Michigan	14
42	November 24, 1945	Ann Arbor	No. 8 Michigan	7	No. 7 Ohio State	3
43	November 23, 1946	Columbus	No. 8 Michigan	58	Ohio State	6
44	November 22, 1947	Ann Arbor	No. 1 Michigan	21	Ohio State	0
45	November 20, 1948	Columbus	No. 1 Michigan	13	No. 18 Ohio State	3
46	November 19, 1949	Ann Arbor	Tie	7	Tie	7
47	November 25, 1950	Columbus	Michigan	9	No. 8 Ohio State	3
48	November 24, 1951	Ann Arbor	Michigan	7	Ohio State	0
49	November 22, 1952	Columbus	Ohio State	27	No. 12 Michigan	7
50	November 21, 1953	Ann Arbor	Michigan	20	Ohio State	0
51	November 20, 1954	Columbus	No. 1 Ohio State	21	No. 12 Michigan	7
52	November 19, 1955	Ann Arbor	No. 9 Ohio State	17	No. 6 Michigan	0
53	November 24, 1956	Columbus	No. 9 Michigan	19	No. 12 Ohio State	0
54	November 23, 1957	Ann Arbor	No. 3 Ohio State	31	No. 19 Michigan	14
55	November 22, 1958	Columbus	No. 11 Ohio State	20	Michigan	14
56	November 21, 1959	Ann Arbor	Michigan	23	Ohio State	14
57	November 19, 1960	Columbus	No. 10 Ohio State	7	Michigan	0
58	November 25, 1961	Ann Arbor	No. 2 Ohio State	50	Michigan	20
59	November 24, 1962	Columbus	Ohio State	28	Michigan	0
60	November 30, 1963	Ann Arbor	Ohio State	14	Michigan	10
61	November 21, 1964	Columbus	No. 6 Michigan	10	No. 7 Ohio State	0
62	November 20, 1965	Ann Arbor	Ohio State	9	Michigan	7

No.	Date	Location	Winning team		Losing team	
63	November 19, 1966	Columbus	Michigan	17	Ohio State	3
64	November 25, 1967	Ann Arbor	Ohio State	24	Michigan	14
65	November 23, 1968	Columbus	No. 2 Ohio State	50	No. 4 Michigan	14
66	November 22, 1969	Ann Arbor	No. 12 Michigan	24	No. 1 Ohio State	12
67	November 21, 1970	Columbus	No. 5 Ohio State	20	No. 4 Michigan	9
68	November 20, 1971	Ann Arbor	No. 3 Michigan	10	Ohio State	7
69	November 25, 1972	Columbus	No. 9 Ohio State	14	No. 3 Michigan	11
70	November 24, 1973	Ann Arbor	Tie	10	Tie	10
71	November 23, 1974	Columbus	No. 4 Ohio State	12	No. 3 Michigan	10
72	November 22, 1975	Ann Arbor	No. 1 Ohio State	21	No. 4 Michigan	14
73	November 20, 1976	Columbus	No. 4 Michigan	22	No. 8 Ohio State	0
74	November 19, 1977	Ann Arbor	No. 5 Michigan	14	No. 4 Ohio State	6
75	November 25, 1978	Columbus	No. 6 Michigan	14	No. 16 Ohio State	3
76	November 17, 1979	Ann Arbor	No. 2 Ohio State	18	No. 13 Michigan	15
77	November 22, 1980	Columbus	No. 10 Michigan	9	No. 5 Ohio State	3
78	November 21, 1981	Ann Arbor	Ohio State	14	No. 7 Michigan	9
79	November 20, 1982	Columbus	Ohio State	24	No. 13 Michigan	14
80	November 19, 1983	Ann Arbor	No. 8 Michigan	24	No. 10 Ohio State	21
81	November 17, 1984	Columbus	No. 11 Ohio State	21	Michigan	6
82	November 23, 1985	Ann Arbor	No. 6 Michigan	27	No. 12 Ohio State	17
83	November 22, 1986	Columbus	No. 6 Michigan	26	No. 7 Ohio State	24
84	November 21, 1987	Ann Arbor	Ohio State	23	Michigan	20
85	November 19, 1988	Columbus	No. 12 Michigan	34	Ohio State	31
86	November 25, 1989	Ann Arbor	No. 3 Michigan	28	No. 20 Ohio State	18
87	November 24, 1990	Columbus	No. 15 Michigan	16	No. 19 Ohio State	13
88	November 23, 1991	Ann Arbor	No. 4 Michigan	31	No. 18 Ohio State	3
89	November 21, 1992	Columbus	Tie	13	Tie	13
90	November 20, 1993	Ann Arbor	Michigan	28	No. 5 Ohio State	0
91	November 19, 1994	Columbus	No. 22 Ohio State	22	No. 15 Michigan	6
92	November 25, 1995	Ann Arbor	No. 18 Michigan	31	No. 2 Ohio State	23
93	November 23, 1996	Columbus	No. 21 Michigan	13	No. 2 Ohio State	9
94	November 22, 1997	Ann Arbor	No. 1 Michigan	20	No. 4 Ohio State	14
95	November 21, 1998	Columbus	No. 7 Ohio State	31	No. 11 Michigan	16
96	November 20, 1999	Ann Arbor	No. 10 Michigan	24	Ohio State	17
97	November 18, 2000	Columbus	No. 19 Michigan	38	No. 12 Ohio State	26
98	November 24, 2001	Ann Arbor	Ohio State	26	No. 11 Michigan	20
99	November 23, 2002	Columbus	No. 2 Ohio State	14	No. 12 Michigan	9
100	November 22, 2003	Ann Arbor	No. 5 Michigan	35	No. 4 Ohio State	21
101	November 20, 2004	Columbus	Ohio State	37	No. 7 Michigan	21
102	November 19, 2005	Ann Arbor	No. 9 Ohio State	25	No. 17 Michigan	21
103	November 18, 2006	Columbus	No. 1 Ohio State	42	No. 2 Michigan	39
104	November 17, 2007	Ann Arbor	No. 7 Ohio State	14	No. 23 Michigan	3
105	November 22, 2008	Columbus	No. 10 Ohio State	42	Michigan	7
106	November 21, 2009	Ann Arbor	No. 9 Ohio State	21	Michigan	10
107	November 27, 2010	Columbus	No. 12 Ohio State^{†}	37	Michigan	7
108	November 26, 2011	Ann Arbor	No. 15 Michigan	40	Ohio State	34
109	November 24, 2012	Columbus	No. 4 Ohio State	26	No. 20 Michigan	21
110	November 30, 2013	Ann Arbor	No. 3 Ohio State	42	Michigan	41
111	November 29, 2014	Columbus	No. 6 Ohio State	42	Michigan	28
112	November 28, 2015	Ann Arbor	No. 8 Ohio State	42	No. 10 Michigan	13
113	November 26, 2016	Columbus	No. 2 Ohio State	30	No. 3 Michigan	27^{2OT}
114	November 25, 2017	Ann Arbor	No. 9 Ohio State	31	Michigan	20
115	November 24, 2018	Columbus	No. 10 Ohio State	62	No. 4 Michigan	39
116	November 30, 2019	Ann Arbor	No. 1 Ohio State	56	No. 13 Michigan	27
117	November 27, 2021	Ann Arbor	No. 5 Michigan	42	No. 2 Ohio State	27
118	November 26, 2022	Columbus	No. 3 Michigan	45	No. 2 Ohio State	23
119	November 25, 2023	Ann Arbor	No. 3 Michigan	30	No. 2 Ohio State	24
120	November 30, 2024	Columbus	Michigan	13	No. 2 Ohio State	10
121	November 29, 2025	Ann Arbor	No. 1 Ohio State	27	No. 15 Michigan	9
122	November 28, 2026	Columbus	Michigan		Ohio State	
Series: Michigan leads 62–52–6

=== Results by location ===
City	Games	Michigan victories	Ohio State victories	Tied games	Years played
Ann Arbor	62	33	25	4	1897–present
Columbus	58	29	27	2	1901–present

=== Top–5 games ===
Since 1936, when the AP Poll began being released continuously, the Buckeyes and Wolverines have met 14 times when both have been ranked in the top 5, which is the most between two rival schools. The first instance came in 1942, with the most recent in 2023. Rankings prior to 2014 are based on the AP poll. Beginning in 2014, rankings are based on the CFP rankings. The 2006 game was the only time the teams were the top two in the rankings.

Ohio State holds a 7–6–1 record in these top-5 meetings.

Year	Away team		Home team		Notes
1942	No. 4 Michigan	14	No. 5 Ohio State	21	
1968	No. 4 Michigan	14	No. 2 Ohio State	50	
1970	No. 4 Michigan	9	No. 5 Ohio State	20	
1973	No. 1 Ohio State	10	No. 4 Michigan	10	
1974	No. 3 Michigan	10	No. 4 Ohio State	12	
1975	No. 1 Ohio State	21	No. 4 Michigan	14	
1977	No. 4 Ohio State	6	No. 5 Michigan	14	
1997	No. 5 Ohio State	14	No. 1 Michigan	20	
2003	No. 4 Ohio State	21	No. 5 Michigan	35	
2006	No. 2 Michigan	39	No. 1 Ohio State	42	
2016	No. 3 Michigan	27	No. 2 Ohio State	30	2OT
2021	No. 2 Ohio State	27	No. 5 Michigan	42	
2022	No. 3 Michigan	45	No. 2 Ohio State	23	
2023	No. 2 Ohio State	24	No. 3 Michigan	30	

=== Big Ten games ===
In Big Ten Conference play, Ohio State leads the series 52–50–4 through the 2025 meeting. Michigan was a charter member of the Big Ten in 1896 before leaving the league after the 1906 football season. Ohio State began league play with the 1913 season, and Michigan returned for the 1917 season. The 1918 matchup between the two schools was the first between them with both as Big Ten members. Ohio State vacated all their games from the 2010 season due to the Ohio State football scandal and Michigan was forced to cancel the 2020 game due to "COVID-19 positives and the associated quarantining required of close-contact individuals."

== See also ==
- List of NCAA college football rivalry games
- List of most-played college football series in NCAA Division I
- Michigan–Ohio State men's basketball rivalry
- Michigan–Ohio State women's basketball rivalry
