= Jim Tressel =

American politician and football coach (born 1952)

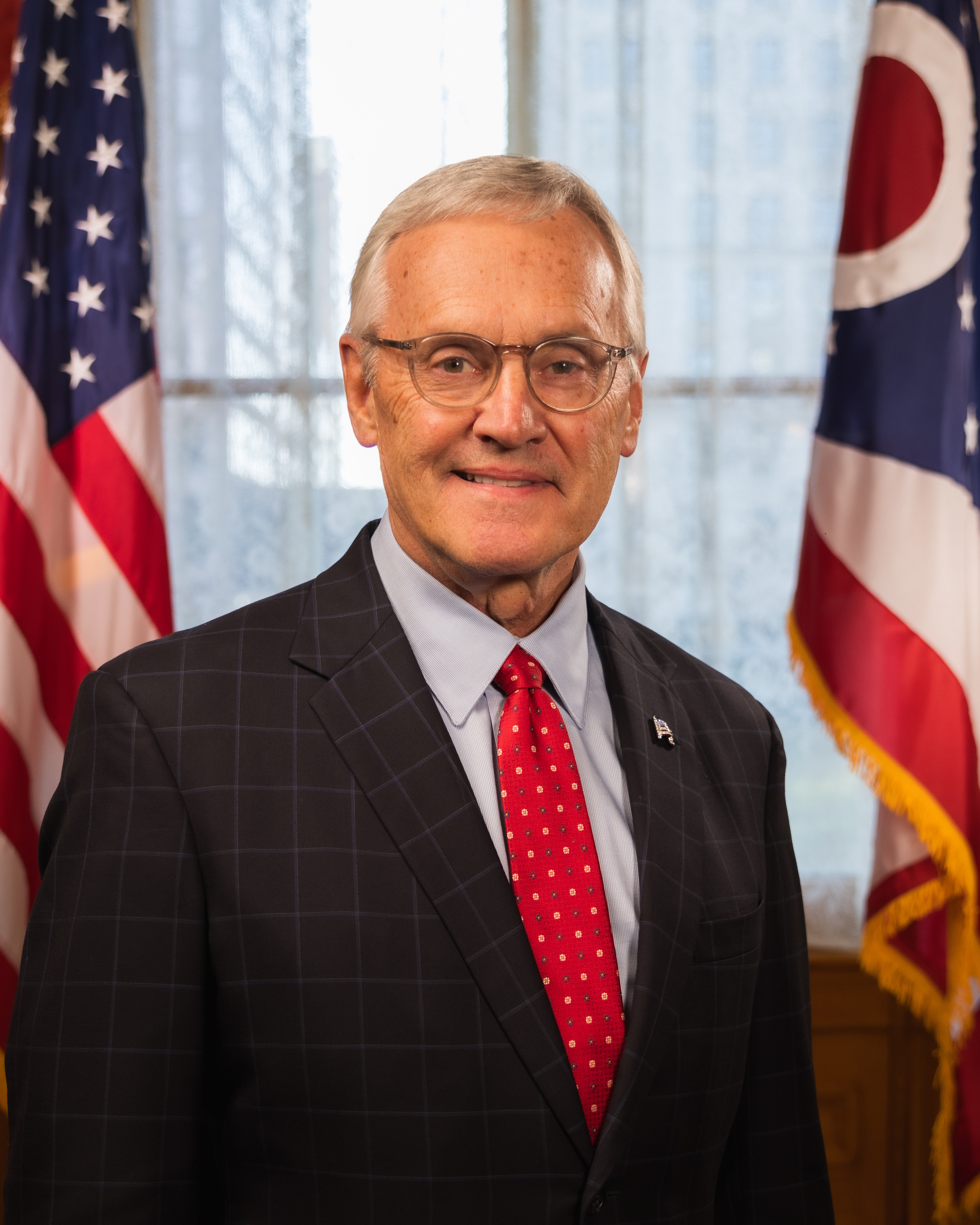
- Official portrait, 2025

67th Lieutenant Governor of Ohio
- Incumbent
- Assumed office February 14, 2025
- Governor: Mike DeWine
- Preceded by: Jon Husted

9th President of Youngstown State University
- In office May 9, 2014 – February 1, 2023
- Preceded by: Randy Dunn
- Succeeded by: Bill Johnson

Personal details
- Born: James Patrick Tressel; December 5, 1952 (age 73) Painesville, Ohio, U.S.
- Party: Republican
- Spouse: Ellen Watson
- Children: 4
- Education: Baldwin Wallace University (BA); University of Akron (MA)
- Coaching career

Playing career
- 1971–1974: Baldwin–Wallace
- Position: Quarterback

Coaching career (HC unless noted)
- 1975–1978: Akron (GA)
- 1979–1980: Miami (OH) (QB/WR)
- 1981–1982: Syracuse (QB)
- 1983: Ohio State (QB/WR)
- 1984–1985: Ohio State (QB/RB/WR)
- 1986–2000: Youngstown State
- 2001–2010: Ohio State
- 2011: Indianapolis Colts (consultant)

Head coaching record
- Overall: 229–79–2
- Bowls: 5–4
- Tournaments: 23–6 (NCAA D-I-AA playoffs)

Accomplishments and honors

Championships
- National (2002); 4 NCAA Division I-AA (1991, 1993–1994, 1997); OVC (1987); 6 Big Ten (2002, 2005–2009)

Awards
- Paul "Bear" Bryant Award (2002); Bobby Dodd Coach of the Year (2002); Eddie Robinson Coach of the Year (2002); Woody Hayes Trophy Coach of the Year (2002); Sporting News Coach of the Year (2002); Eddie Robinson Award (1994)
- College Football Hall of Fame; Inducted in 2015 (profile)

James Patrick Tressel (born December 5, 1952) is an American politician and retired college football coach who has served as the 67th lieutenant governor of Ohio since 2025. A member of the Republican Party, Tressel previously was the president of Youngstown State University from 2014 to 2023. Before entering higher education administration and public office, Tressel was the head football coach of the Youngstown State Penguins and later the Ohio State Buckeyes from 1986 to 2010. His teams won five national championships (four with YSU during the 1990s, and one with OSU in 2002), earning him multiple Coach of the Year accolades and induction into the College Football Hall of Fame in 2015.

Tressel was born in Painesville, Ohio and attended Baldwin–Wallace College, where he played football as quarterback under his father, Lee Tressel. He became Youngstown State's fourth head football coach in 1986 and remained there until 2000 before succeeding John Cooper as head coach at Ohio State in 2001. During his tenure as Ohio State's 22nd head football coach, Tressel's teams competed in three BCS National Championship Games and his 2002 squad won a national title, achieving the first 14–0 season record in major college football since the 1897 Penn Quakers.

Tressel resigned from Ohio State in May 2011 amid an NCAA investigation into improper benefits involving players during the 2010 season, which resulted in the university vacating victories from that year, including the 2011 Sugar Bowl. He later served as a consultant for the Indianapolis Colts from 2011 to 2012 and as vice president of strategic engagement at the University of Akron from 2012 to 2014, before becoming president of Youngstown State University. On February 10, 2025, Governor Mike DeWine nominated Tressel as Ohio lieutenant governor; he was confirmed on February 12 and sworn in on February 14.

== Early life ==
Tressel was born on December 5, 1952, in Painesville, Ohio, a suburb of Cleveland. He grew up in nearby Mentor, Ohio, where his father, Lee Tressel, was the football coach at Mentor High School. After a 34-game winning streak at Mentor, Lee coached at Massillon Washington High School for two seasons before being named the head football coach for Baldwin–Wallace College in Berea, Ohio. Tressel attended many of his father's games and practices, and developed a friendship with his neighbor and former Cleveland Browns player Lou Groza. Tressel's mother, Eloise Tressel, worked as the athletic historian at Baldwin–Wallace while his father was the head coach.

After graduating from Berea High School in 1971, Tressel played quarterback under his father at Baldwin–Wallace College. As quarterback, he earned four varsity letters and won all-conference honors as a senior in 1974. Tressel also joined the Alpha Tau Omega fraternity. In 1975, Tressel graduated from Baldwin–Wallace with a bachelor's degree in education.

== Coaching career ==
=== Early positions ===
After graduating from Baldwin–Wallace, Tressel became a graduate assistant at the University of Akron. He coached the quarterbacks, receivers, and running backs, while earning a master's degree in education. In 1978, he left to become quarterbacks and receivers coach at Miami University in Oxford, Ohio. By 1981, he had left to become the quarterbacks coach at Syracuse. In 1983, he was hired at Ohio State to be the quarterbacks and receivers coach. That year, OSU had a 9–3 record, including a 28–23 victory over Pittsburgh in the Fiesta Bowl; a 39-yard pass from quarterback Mike Tomczak to wide receiver Thad Jemison clinched the win with 39 seconds remaining in the game. In 1984, he was given the added responsibility of coaching the running backs. That year, the team became Big Ten champs, played in the Rose Bowl, and tailback Keith Byars finished second in the Heisman Trophy voting. In 1985, OSU defeated BYU in the Citrus Bowl.

=== Youngstown State ===
At the end of the 1985 season, Jim Tressel left his position as assistant head coach at Ohio State to become head coach at Youngstown State University. In Tressel's first season as coach, Youngstown State finished with a 2–9 record. In his second season, Youngstown State finished the season with an 8–4 record and won the Ohio Valley Conference championship. From 1991 to 1994, Youngstown State played in the Division I-AA National Championship game four times. In 1991, Tressel won his first national championship, defeating Marshall; the victory made him and his father the only father-son duo to win national championships in college football at that time (Vince and Larry Kehres have also won national championships).

Youngstown State won two more national championships in the following three years: against Marshall in 1993 (who had defeated them in 1992) and Boise State in 1994. 1997 brought Tressel his fourth national championship with a 10–9 victory against McNeese State. He earned his 100th win against Indiana State. 1999 marked Tressel's ninth visit to the Division I-AA playoffs, but the team lost to a Paul Johnson coached Georgia Southern in the title game. 2000 presented Tressel with more success, leading Youngstown State to a 9–3 season and its 10th playoff appearance. During the 1990s, Youngstown State had a record of 103–27–2, the most wins by any Division I-AA team and fourth most of both Division I-A and I-AA combined. Tressel's overall record at Youngstown was 135–57–2. He was also named Division I-AA Coach of the Year in '91, '93, '94, and '97.

In 1998, Tressel's reputation was blemished when it emerged that Ray Isaac, quarterback on his first national championship team, admitted to accepting massive benefits from Mickey Monus, the founder of Phar-Mor and former chairman of the Youngstown State board of trustees. The NCAA had been tipped off about the violations in 1994, but dropped its inquiry after a cursory internal investigation by Youngstown State. The nature of the violations only came to light when Isaac admitted to tampering with a juror in Monus' first corporate fraud trial. It later emerged that Tressel had never met with Isaac during the initial 1994 investigation. Monus subsequently testified that when Isaac initially came to Youngstown State in 1988, Tressel called Monus and asked him to work out a job for Isaac. Youngstown State subsequently admitted to a lack of institutional control and docked itself scholarships. The NCAA ultimately faulted Tressel and Youngstown State for their cursory 1994 investigation, but did not cite them for wrongdoing. Youngstown State was also allowed to keep its 1991 title since the NCAA's statute of limitations had expired.

On July 9, 2007, Jim and Ellen Tressel, along with Frank and Norma Watson, donated $1 million to Youngstown State University for the building of an indoor athletics facility named the Watson and Tressel Training Site. The facility opened for use in the fall of 2011. This was the second major donation the Tressels and Watsons made to YSU. In 2003, they donated a combined $250,000 to the campaign for the Andrews Student Recreation and Wellness Center, which opened in 2005.

=== Ohio State ===
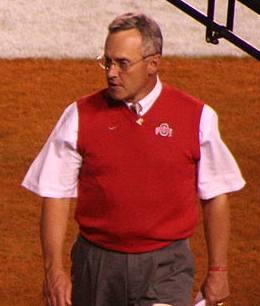
Tressel's sweater vest became a trademark for the coach, especially after he went to Ohio State.

When John Cooper was dismissed as Ohio State's head football coach following a loss to unranked South Carolina in the 2001 Outback Bowl, Tressel returned to Ohio State as Cooper's successor. While addressing Buckeye fans during halftime of a basketball game just after being hired as head coach, Tressel declared, "I can assure you that you will be proud of your young people in the classroom, in the community, and most especially in 310 days in Ann Arbor, Michigan, on the football field."

Tressel coached the Buckeyes to two 19-game winning streaks, one which spanned the 2002 and 2003 seasons and the other which spanned the 2005 and 2006 seasons. Tressel's winning percentage at Ohio State of 81.0% (maintained over an extensive 10 seasons/116 games coached) is tied with John B. Eckstorm (29 games coached) for the second best in school history, behind only Carroll Widdoes' 16–2 (88.9%, 18 games coached) mark in the 1944–1945 seasons.

Most importantly to many Buckeyes fans and former players, Tressel was 9–1 versus Michigan.

As Ohio State's head coach, Tressel was known for a conservative style of play calling (dubbed "Tresselball"), winning games with just enough scoring, strong defense, and "playing field position." Tressel often referred to the punt as the most important play in football. He is sometimes referred to as "The Senator" (most notably by ESPN's Chris Fowler), because of his composure on the sidelines during play and his diplomatic way of interacting with representatives from the media. He is also referred to as "The Vest" for his penchant for wearing a sweater vest on the sidelines.

Until his retirement, Tressel was one of only two active coaches with five or more national championships in any division (only Larry Kehres of Division III Mount Union College has more with 10). He is the third Tressel to reach 100 wins, joining his father (155 wins) and his older brother, Dick (former OSU running backs coach), who coached at Hamline University (124 wins). As a family, with Jim's 229 wins, Lee, Jim, and Dick have won 508 games.

During Tressel's first year (2001), Ohio State had a 7–5 record. Ohio State returned to the Outback Bowl, where the Buckeyes once again fell to South Carolina. Although the Buckeyes lost on a last-minute field goal, the team battled back to tie the game at 28–28 after being down 28–0. Despite a second consecutive bowl loss and a 5-loss season, Tressel had coached the Buckeyes to a 26–20 upset victory over Michigan, fulfilling the promise he had made 10 months earlier.

The following year (2002) Tressel and the Buckeyes became the first team in college football history to finish 14–0, defeating the heavily favored University of Miami Hurricanes in double overtime to win the 2003 Fiesta Bowl and the 2002 National Championship. It was Ohio State's first national championship in 32 years. That success made him the first coach in NCAA history to win the AFCA's Coach of the Year award while at different schools; he is also the first to win the award in two different divisions.

They were able to earn the national championship through close wins on a defensive-minded scheme that relied on field position. With a combination of senior leadership with Michael Doss and freshman Maurice Clarett, Tressel was able to pull out many close games during the season. Seven of their 14 victories were within 7 points including one overtime game against Illinois, and a double overtime game coming in the 2003 Fiesta Bowl.

Coming off the national title season, the Buckeyes earned an 11–2 record in 2003, but the team lost to Michigan in the 100th meeting between the two teams 35–21. The Buckeyes finished the 2003 season with a 35–28 victory over Kansas State in the Fiesta Bowl on January 2, 2004.

In 2004, the team finished 8–4, closing out the season with a 33–7 victory against Oklahoma State at the Alamo Bowl and upsetting Michigan in the annual rivalry game. Ohio State was unranked and Michigan was ranked 7th and the final score was 37 to 21.

During 2005, the Buckeyes had a 10–2 record which featured an early season loss to eventual BCS National Champion Texas and another in Happy Valley versus Penn State, who finished the season ranked third in the BCS. However, the season ended with the Buckeyes defeating Notre Dame 34–20 in the Fiesta Bowl.

The 2006 Ohio State Buckeyes football team went undefeated in the regular season—including a 42–39 victory over Michigan which saw the first ever meeting between the two teams ranking numbers 1 and 2, respectively, in the national polls. Ohio State finished second in the final AP and Coaches polls after losing the 2007 BCS National Championship Game to the University of Florida, 41–14.

In the 2007 season Jim Tressel led the 11–1 Buckeyes to a third consecutive Big Ten Championship and second consecutive National Championship berth, played January 7, 2008, against the LSU Tigers, in the Superdome. However OSU was beaten 38–24 by LSU, becoming only the second team to lose two consecutive BCS title games (the first being the University of Oklahoma).

In 2008 Ohio State won their fourth straight Big Ten title. However, they lost the conference's automatic BCS berth and trip to the Rose Bowl on the head to head tiebreaker with a 13–6 loss to Penn State at home on October 26. The Buckeyes played Texas in the Fiesta Bowl, coming back from an 11-point second half deficit to take the lead with just over 2 minutes to play, only to lose when Texas scored with 16 seconds remaining.

The 2009 team won its fifth straight conference title and earned a berth in the Rose Bowl against Oregon, winning the game 26–17.

The 2010 OSU football season finished with the team posting a 12–1 record after beating Arkansas in the 2011 Sugar Bowl, 31-26. However, all of the wins were later vacated due to Tressel knowingly using ineligible players, leaving the team's "official" record for the campaign as 0–1.

The Tressel family continued the tradition of supporting the campus where Jim coached. As co-chairs on the contribution campaign, Coach Tressel and wife Ellen made a sizeable donation toward the renovation of Ohio State's $109 million William Oxley Thompson Memorial Library. The fourth-floor outdoor Tressel Terrace honors them for their contribution. Tressel also promised continuing donations to the library through royalties from his book, "The Winners Manual." The Tressel family also teamed with Ohio State's Comprehensive Cancer Center – James Cancer Hospital and Solove Research Institute by establishing, promoting and donating to the Tressel Family Fund for Cancer Prevention Research. Both of Jim Tressel's parents died of cancer. Further, the Tressels donated a monument titled "Traditions," erected in 2011 in a park near OSU's ROTC center. Remembrance park honors more than a thousand Ohio State alumni who, as military personnel, lost their lives in service to the United States.

==== NCAA violations and resignation ====
On March 8, 2011, Ohio State suspended Tressel for the first two games of the 2011 season and fined him $250,000 for failing to notify the school of NCAA violations involving Ohio State football players. The players had a financial arrangement with Edward Rife, owner of a local tattoo parlor, who was at the time under investigation by the FBI for drug trafficking. The arrangement, which resulted in five Ohio State football players being suspended, involved trading championship rings, jerseys, and other football-related awards for tattoos. That arrangement was a violation of NCAA rules, and would have rendered the players, including star quarterback Terrelle Pryor, ineligible to play for portions of the 2010 season.

Tressel was first notified of the arrangement in April 2010 when he received several e-mails from Chris Cicero, a local attorney and former Ohio State walk-on football player. Tressel never forwarded the e-mails, nor the information contained in them about potential violations, to his school's compliance office or the NCAA. Although Tressel had held the position of athletic director at Youngstown State, Tressel's excuse was that he did not know whom to contact when he learned of the alleged violations. Tressel also later claimed not to have acted because of concerns about the confidentiality of the information, yet he immediately forwarded the first e-mail to Terrelle Pryor's mentor.

On December 7, 2010, Ohio State was notified by the Department of Justice that it had in its possession many items of Ohio State sports memorabilia seized from Edward Rife's tattoo parlor. In the ensuing investigation, Tressel was questioned by Ohio State on December 16 concerning his knowledge of the activities disclosed by the Justice Department (the sale of rings, jerseys, and football memorabilia to Rife). Tressel denied any specific knowledge of the violations, and claimed that he could not remember who had given him the vague information. A week later Tressel exchanged text messages with Cicero, the attorney who had originally notified him of the activities back in April. Tressel verified that the Justice Department matter involved the same players and issues as the April e-mails. Tressel remained silent, his long-time knowledge of the violations (and his subsequent intentional fielding of ineligible players throughout the season) revealed only when Ohio State inadvertently discovered the April 2010 Cicero e-mails in an unrelated search in January 2011.

On March 17, 2011, it was announced that Tressel requested Ohio State Athletic Director Gene Smith that he extend his own suspension to the same number of games as his players. Smith accepted the request, meaning Tressel would have sat out the first five games of the 2011 season.

No, are you kidding? ... I'm just hoping the coach doesn't dismiss me.

— Ohio State President Gordon Gee, when asked whether he would fire Tressel

Ohio State President Gordon Gee assured the public that Tressel would not lose his job over the matter. On April 25, 2011, the NCAA accused Tressel of withholding information and lying to keep Buckeyes players on the field. In a "notice of allegations" sent to Ohio State, the NCAA charged that Tressel's actions were considered "potential major violations" which had "permitted football student-athletes to participate in intercollegiate athletics while ineligible." The report also said he "failed to comport himself ... (with) honesty and integrity" and that he lied when he filled out a compliance form in September stating that he had no knowledge of NCAA violations by any of his players. Tressel later stated that he lied about the violations because he didn't want to jeopardize the FBI's investigation against Rife and also feared for his players' safety. Despite his stated safety concerns, Tressel only briefly spoke with two players, never inquired of the two if other players were involved and also in danger, nor in his discussions with players ever mentioned Mr. Rife, the tattoo parlor, or the selling of Ohio State merchandise. The NCAA's report explicitly refuted the credibility of this excuse.

Tressel resigned as Ohio State's head football coach on May 30, 2011. Three days earlier, Sports Illustrated reported that it had found evidence that the memorabilia-for-tattoos scandal dated back to at least the 2002 national championship season, and as many as 28 players were involved. Early on the morning of Memorial Day, Gee and Smith called Tressel back from his vacation in Colorado and asked for his resignation. The Columbus Dispatch reported that Gee had appointed a special committee to examine the scandal's impact on the school. It also reported that Ohio State had been looking to cut ties with Tressel for several weeks. Tressel said in a statement released by the university, "After meeting with university officials, we agreed that it is in the best interest of Ohio State that I resign as head football coach. The appreciation that Ellen and I have for the Buckeye Nation is immeasurable." Luke Fickell, previously co-defensive coordinator and assistant head coach, was head coach for the 2011 football season.

Tressel left Ohio State as the third-winningest coach in school history, behind Woody Hayes and John Cooper. However, on July 8, 2011, Ohio State vacated all of its wins from the 2010 season and placed the football program on two years' probation.

On December 20, 2011, the NCAA placed Ohio State on an additional one year's probation and banned it from postseason play in 2012 for numerous major violations under Tressel's watch. It also imposed a five-year show-cause penalty on Tressel, which means any NCAA member that wants to hire him would have to "show cause" for why it shouldn't be sanctioned for hiring him, and could face severe penalties if he commits any further violations during that time. The order stood until December 19, 2016; given past precedent, this likely had the effect of blackballing Tressel from the coaching ranks until the 2017 season. Had Tressel coached during this period, he would have been suspended for the first five games of the regular season, plus any conference championship game or bowl game.

=== Indianapolis Colts ===
On September 2, 2011, Tressel was hired by the Indianapolis Colts as a game-day/replay consultant. Tressel was suspended by the Colts until the 7th game of the season due to his involvement in the NCAA violations during his tenure as head coach at Ohio State.

== Administrative career ==
On February 2, 2012, Tressel accepted a non-athletic-department position where he started his coaching career, the University of Akron. His title was Vice President of Strategic Engagement.

In January 2013, various media reports stated that Tressel would possibly return to Youngstown State University to replace retiring university president Cynthia Anderson as the next president of the university. Tressel was still revered in the area and a new athletic training complex bearing his name, the Watson and Tressel Training Site, opened on campus in 2011. However, Tressel's highest level of education is a master's degree; a doctorate is commonplace for a university president position in the United States. Combined with the show-cause penalty that was in effect for Tressel until 2016, on paper it would have been a tough sell for YSU to bring back Tressel. Supporters for bringing back Tressel also cited this, but mentioned that as university president, his primary job would be for fundraising, in which Tressel had previously excelled over the years as head coach at both YSU and Ohio State.

On May 10, 2013, Randy Dunn was chosen as successor to Anderson, but only stayed on the job for seven months, ultimately leaving for Southern Illinois University. After Dunn's sudden departure, Tressel's name again came up as a possible replacement. Tressel officially applied for the position on April 13, 2014; at the same time he remained one of 19 candidates for the University of Akron president's job. Nearly a month later, on May 9, 2014, the YSU Board of Trustees, by unanimous vote, offered Tressel the position of university president. Tressel accepted, and announced that he was officially retired from coaching. He held the university president job for nearly a decade. On June 23, 2022, Tressel announced his retirement from the position, effective February 1, 2023.

As Youngstown State president, Tressel was credited for increasing graduation rates from 35 to 49%, quadrupling the size of the Honors College, and adding hundreds of units of dormitories and apartments to increase the number of students living on or near campus. Tressel helped lead a delegation to obtain $10 million in federal funds to improve roadways around the university. He also fostered closer ties with the business community, creating an Excellence Training Center which offers certificates to students for in demand jobs, and aligning research with the needs of local businesses. The university raised over $150 million during Tressel's tenure.

== Lieutenant Governor of Ohio (2025–present) ==
On February 10, 2025, Ohio Governor Mike DeWine nominated Tressel to serve as Ohio's 67th lieutenant governor after Jon Husted was appointed by DeWine to fill the Senate seat vacated by JD Vance, who resigned after being elected Vice President of the United States. The Ohio General Assembly subsequently confirmed Governor DeWine's nomination, and Tressel was officially sworn into office in the Rotunda of the Ohio Statehouse on February 14.

Tressel confirmed that he was considering a 2026 run for governor on May 8, 2025, but later declined to run. He announced the statewide "Team Tressel Fitness Challenge" on August 25, designed to encourage elementary and middle schoolers to develop fitness and sleep routines.

== Personal life ==
Tressel and his wife Ellen, a Youngstown State graduate, are actively involved with the Fellowship of Christian Athletes, Athletes in Action, the OSU Thompson Libraries and The Ohio State University Medical Center, particularly the James Cancer Center. Tressel has three children from a prior marriage: Zak, Carlee, and Whitney; Ellen has one, Eric. He currently lives in the Youngstown area. Jim's brother, Dick Tressel, was his running backs coach at Ohio State for seven seasons after serving as the head coach at Hamline University for 23 seasons. Dick's son, and Jim's nephew, is Mike Tressel, the defensive coordinator at the University of Wisconsin.

== Head coaching record ==
Year	Team	Overall	Conference	Standing	Bowl/playoffs	Coaches^{#}	AP^{°}
Youngstown State Penguins (Ohio Valley Conference) (1986–1987)
1986	Youngstown State	2–9	2–5	7th			
1987	Youngstown State	8–4	5–1	T–1st	L NCAA Division I-AA First Round		
Youngstown State Penguins (NCAA Division I-AA independent) (1988–1996)
1988	Youngstown State	4–7					
1989	Youngstown State	9–4			L NCAA Division I-AA Second Round		
1990	Youngstown State	11–1			L NCAA Division I-AA First Round		
1991	Youngstown State	12–3			W NCAA Division I-AA Championship		
1992	Youngstown State	11–3–1			L NCAA Division I-AA Championship		
1993	Youngstown State	13–2			W NCAA Division I-AA Championship		
1994	Youngstown State	14–0–1			W NCAA Division I-AA Championship		
1995	Youngstown State	3–8					
1996	Youngstown State	8–3					
Youngstown State Penguins (Gateway Football Conference) (1997–2000)
1997	Youngstown State	13–2	4–2	3rd	W NCAA Division I-AA Championship		
1998	Youngstown State	6–5	3–3	T–3rd			
1999	Youngstown State	12–3	5–1	2nd	L NCAA Division I-AA Championship		
2000	Youngstown State	9–3	4–2	T–2nd	L NCAA Division I-AA First Round		
Youngstown State:		135–57–2	23–14				
Ohio State Buckeyes (Big Ten Conference) (2001–2010)
2001	Ohio State	7–5	5–3	3rd	L Outback		
2002	Ohio State	14–0	8–0	T–1st	W Fiesta^{†}	1	1
2003	Ohio State	11–2	6–2	T–2nd	W Fiesta^{†}	4	4
2004	Ohio State	8–4	4–4	T–5th	W Alamo	19	20
2005	Ohio State	10–2	7–1	T–1st	W Fiesta^{†}	4	4
2006	Ohio State	12–1	8–0	1st	L BCS NCG^{†}	2	2
2007	Ohio State	11–2	7–1	1st	L BCS NCG^{†}	5	5
2008	Ohio State	10–3	7–1	T–1st	L Fiesta^{†}	9	9
2009	Ohio State	11–2	7–1	1st	W Rose^{†}	5	5
2010	Ohio State	12–1	7–1	T–1st	W Sugar^{†}	5	5
Ohio State:		106–23	63–15				
Total:		229–79–2					
National championship Conference title Conference division title or championship game berth
^{†}Indicates BCS bowl.; ^{#}Rankings from final Coaches Poll.; ^{°}Rankings from final AP Poll.

* Ohio State vacated all 12 wins from 2010, including the Sugar Bowl, due to ineligible players.

== Awards and honors ==
National Championships

- NCAA Division I-AA - 1991, 1993, 1994, 1997
- Bowl Championship Series - 2002

Coach of The Year

- Three-time AFCA Coach of the Year:
  - 1991, 1994 (Division I-AA)
  - 2002 (Division I-A)
- Eddie Robinson Award - 1994
- Bobby Dodd Award - 2002
- Paul "Bear" Bryant Award - 2002
- Eddie Robinson Award - 2002
- Sporting News - 2002
- Woody Hayes Trophy - 2002, 2006
- Columbus Dispatch Ohio College Football - 2010

Halls of Fame

- Baldwin–Wallace College Athletic Hall of Fame - 1975
- Greater Cleveland Sports Hall of Fame - 2012
- Youngstown State Athletics Hall of Fame - 2013
- College Football Hall of Fame - 2015
- Ohio State Athletics Hall of Fame - 2015

State/local

- 2008 Baldwin–Wallace College named its football field "Tressel Field (at Finnie Stadium)" to honor his family's affiliation with the school's football team

== Coaching tree ==
Coached under:

- Jim Dennison: Akron (1975–1978)
- Tom Reed: Miami (OH) (1979–1980)
- Earle Bruce: Ohio State (1983–1985)
- Dick MacPherson: Syracuse (1981–1982)

Former assistants who became NCAA Division I FBS or NFL head coaches:

- Tim Beckman: Toledo (2009–2011), Illinois (2012–2014)
- Mark Dantonio: Cincinnati (2004–2006), Michigan State (2007–2020)
- Luke Fickell: Ohio State (2011), Cincinnati (2017–2022), Wisconsin (2023–present)
- P. J. Fleck: Western Michigan (2013–2016), Minnesota (2017–present)
- Darrell Hazell: Kent State (2011–2012), Purdue (2013–2016)
- Paul Haynes: Kent State (2013–2017)
- Jon Heacock: Youngstown State (2001–2009)
- Mark Mangino: Kansas (2002–2009)
- Mark Snyder: Marshall (2005–2009)
- Mel Tucker: Colorado (2019), Michigan State (2020–2023)
- Marcus Freeman: Notre Dame (2021–present)
- Alex Golesh: South Florida (2023–2025), Auburn (2026–present)

== See also ==
- List of college football career coaching wins leaders

Academic offices
Preceded by Randy Dunn	President of Youngstown State University; 2014–2023	Succeeded by Bill Johnson
Political offices
Preceded by Jon Husted	Lieutenant Governor of Ohio; 2025–present	Incumbent
