= 2011 Sugar Bowl =

2011 Allstate Sugar Bowl
- BCS Bowl Game; 77th Sugar Bowl
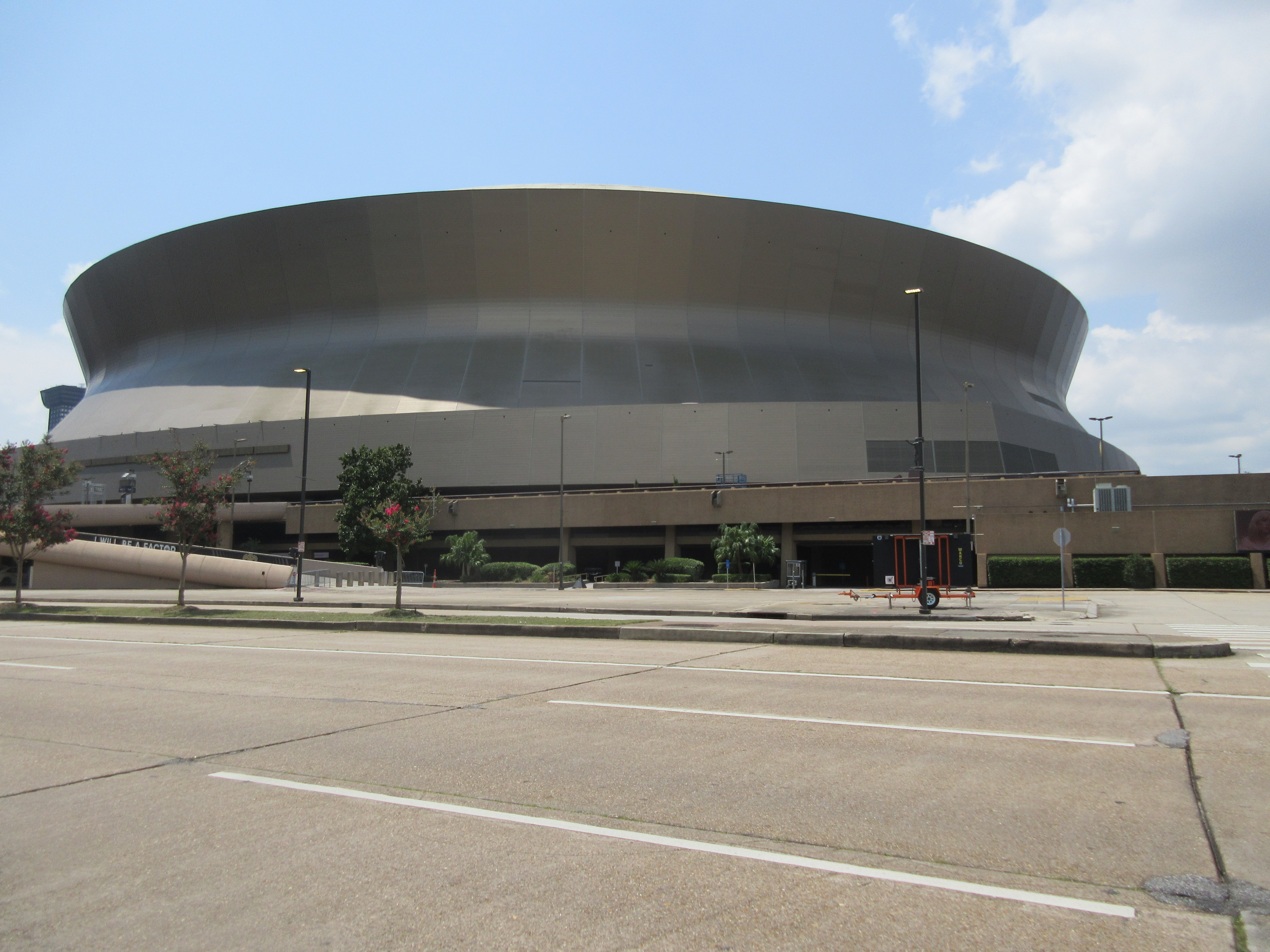
- The Louisiana Superdome in New Orleans, Louisiana, hosted the Sugar Bowl.
Ohio State Buckeyes	Arkansas Razorbacks
(11–1 (Note: Ohio State later vacated all wins during the season for an official 0–1 record.))	(10–2)
Big Ten	SEC
31	26
Head coach: Jim Tressel	Head coach: Bobby Petrino
AP / Coaches / BCS; 6 / 6 / 6	AP / Coaches / BCS; 8 / T-8 / 8
	1	2	3	4	Total
Ohio State	14	14	3	0	31
Arkansas	7	3	11	5	26
- Date: January 4, 2011
- Season: 2010
- Stadium: Louisiana Superdome
- Location: New Orleans, Louisiana
- MVP: Terrelle Pryor, QB, Ohio State
- Favorite: Ohio State by 3
- National anthem: Darius Rucker
- Referee: Jeff Flanagan (ACC)
- Attendance: 73,879
- Payout: US$14-17 million

United States TV coverage
- Network: ESPN
- Announcers: Brad Nessler (Play by Play); Todd Blackledge (Analyst); Holly Rowe (Sideline)
- Nielsen ratings: 8.4 (13.6 million)

The 2011 Allstate Sugar Bowl was an American college football bowl game that was part of the Bowl Championship Series (BCS) for the 2010 NCAA Division I FBS football season and was the 77th Sugar Bowl. The contest took place on January 4, 2011, in the Louisiana Superdome in New Orleans, Louisiana. The game had an 8 p.m. (ET) kickoff. Paul Hoolahan was the executive director.

The Sugar Bowl Committee overlooked the #4 Stanford Cardinal and selected as its participants the #6 Ohio State Buckeyes from the Big Ten Conference and the #8 Arkansas Razorbacks from the Southeastern Conference. The Buckeyes won 31–26. Ohio State quarterback Terrelle Pryor was named the game's Most Valuable Player.

On July 8, 2011, under scrutiny from the NCAA due to a variety of program irregularities and violations of Ohio State University and NCAA policies, Ohio State vacated the 2011 Sugar Bowl win along with 11 other victories in their 2010 season. Ohio State head coach Jim Tressel, initially dismissed during the scandal, was subsequently allowed to retire from his position as head coach. The game's MVP, Pryor, did not finish his fourth year of eligibility for football at Ohio State, opting instead to seek employment in the National Football League.

Initially barred from the postseason play by the Ohio State coaching staff were Pryor, leading rusher Dan Herron, wide receiver DeVier Posey, offensive tackle Mike Adams, and defensive end Solomon Thomas. On December 23, 2010 Pryor and the four other players were granted permission to participate in the upcoming Sugar Bowl contest. This reversal came after the five suspended players publicly committed to remain at the institution for the 2011 season if allowed to participate in the upcoming Sugar Bowl. Subsequent to the 2011 Sugar Bowl, Pryor reneged on his promise to complete his fourth year.

The 2011 Sugar Bowl was the first-ever meeting between Ohio State and Arkansas. Prior to this game, the Big Ten Conference had a 1–4 record in the Sugar Bowl, with the sole victory coming when the 1998 Ohio State Buckeyes defeated Texas A&M in the 1999 Sugar Bowl. The Buckeyes came into the game 0–9 against SEC schools in bowl games all-time and they had not beaten a SEC opponent since 1988, when they defeated LSU in a regular-season game by a score of 36–33. This bowl game win was vacated due to NCAA violations.

== Teams ==
=== Ohio State ===
Coach Jim Tressel had a record of 105–22 at Ohio State. His team was led offensively by Dan Herron with 192 rushes for 1,068 yards and 15 touchdowns, quarterback Terrelle Pryor with 196 of 298 passes for 2,551 yards and 25 touchdowns, and receiver Dane Sanzenbacher on 52 receptions for 889 yards and 10 touchdowns. Defensively, Brian Rolle had 70 tackles, Nathan Williams had 4.5 sacks for 35 yards, and Chimdi Chekwa with 3 interceptions for 22 yards.

On December 22, 2010, it was reported that Terrelle Pryor, Dan Herron, DeVier Posey, Mike Adams, and Solomon Thomas had traded autographs for tattoos, a violation of NCAA rules. The school investigated the allegations and reported that the five players would not miss the Sugar Bowl but will miss five games of the 2011 season. The sixth player will miss Ohio State's season opener. The five players involved stated their intentions to return to Ohio State for the 2011 season, but after Coach Tressel's resignation in May, 2011 Terrelle Pryor announced that he would not return to play for Ohio State in 2011 and would probably enter the NFL supplemental draft.

=== Arkansas ===
Arkansas Coach Bobby Petrino was in his third year with the team, with a 23-14 record. Offensive leaders included tailback Knile Davis, who ran 178 times for 1,183 yards and 13 touchdowns, quarterback Ryan Mallett who completed 242 of 364 passes for 3,592 yards and 30 touchdowns, and a pair of receivers in D.J. Williams (49 receptions for 589 yards, 4 TDs) and Jarius Wright (38 catches for 718 yards, 4 touchdowns). Operated on a 4–3 defense scheme, the team was led by Jerry Franklin with 93 tackles, Jake Bequette on 7.0 sacks for 36 yards, and Tramain Thomas who had 4 interceptions for 24 yards.

== Game summary ==
The Buckeyes struck first, with Dane Sanzenbacher recovering a fumble in the end zone after Terrelle Pryor fumbled on the 3-yard line. Arkansas struck back with Ryan Mallett connecting with Joe Adams on a 17-yard pass. Dan Herron added a 9-yard run, and Sanzenbacher and DeVier Posey caught touchdown passes of 15 and 43 yards respectively to give the Buckeyes a big lead. Zach Hocker hit a 20-yard field goal as time expired and the Razorbacks were down 28–10 at the half.

In the third quarter, the momentum shifted Arkansas' direction. Hocker and Devin Barclay traded field goals, then Mallett connected with Jarius Wright for a touchdown, then made the two-point conversion on a pass to D. J. Williams to pull within ten. The Razorbacks closed the gap further in the fourth, on a safety by Jake Bequette and another field goal by Hocker. With just over a minute left, Arkansas blocked Ohio State's punt and recovered on the 18-yard line. However, on 2nd down & 10, Mallett's pass was intercepted. The Buckeyes would run out the clock for a 31–26 victory. This was Ohio State's first bowl win over an SEC opponent.

=== Scoring summary ===
Scoring play	Score
1st quarter
OSU – Dane Sanzenbacher recovered fumble in end zone (Devin Barclay kick), 11:41	OSU 7–0
ARK – Joe Adams 17-yard pass from Ryan Mallett (Zach Hocker kick), 9:43	TIE 7–7
OSU – Dan Herron 9-yard run (Barclay kick), 7:17	OSU 14–7
2nd quarter
OSU – Sanzenbacher 15-yard pass from Terrelle Pryor (Barclay kick), 9:53	OSU 21–7
OSU – DeVier Posey 43-yard pass from Pryor (Barclay kick), 1:59	OSU 28–7
ARK – Hocker 20-yard field goal, 0:00	OSU 28–10
3rd quarter
ARK – Hocker 46-yard field goal, 9:14	OSU 28–13
OSU – Barclay 46-yard field goal, 4:10	OSU 31–13
ARK – Jarius Wright 22-yard pass from Mallett (Mallett pass to D.J. Williams), 0:58	OSU 31–21
4th quarter
ARK – Herron tackled in end zone by Jake Bequette, 11:52	OSU 31–23
ARK – Hocker 47-yard field goal, 8:55	OSU 31–26

=== Statistics ===
Statistics	Ohio State	Arkansas
First downs	20	23
Total yards	446	402
Rushes-yards (net)	45-225	31-125
Passing yards (net)	221	277
Passes, Comp-Att-Int	14-25-0	24-47-1
Time of Possession	27:59	32:01
