= Sweater vest =

Sleeveless knit pullover

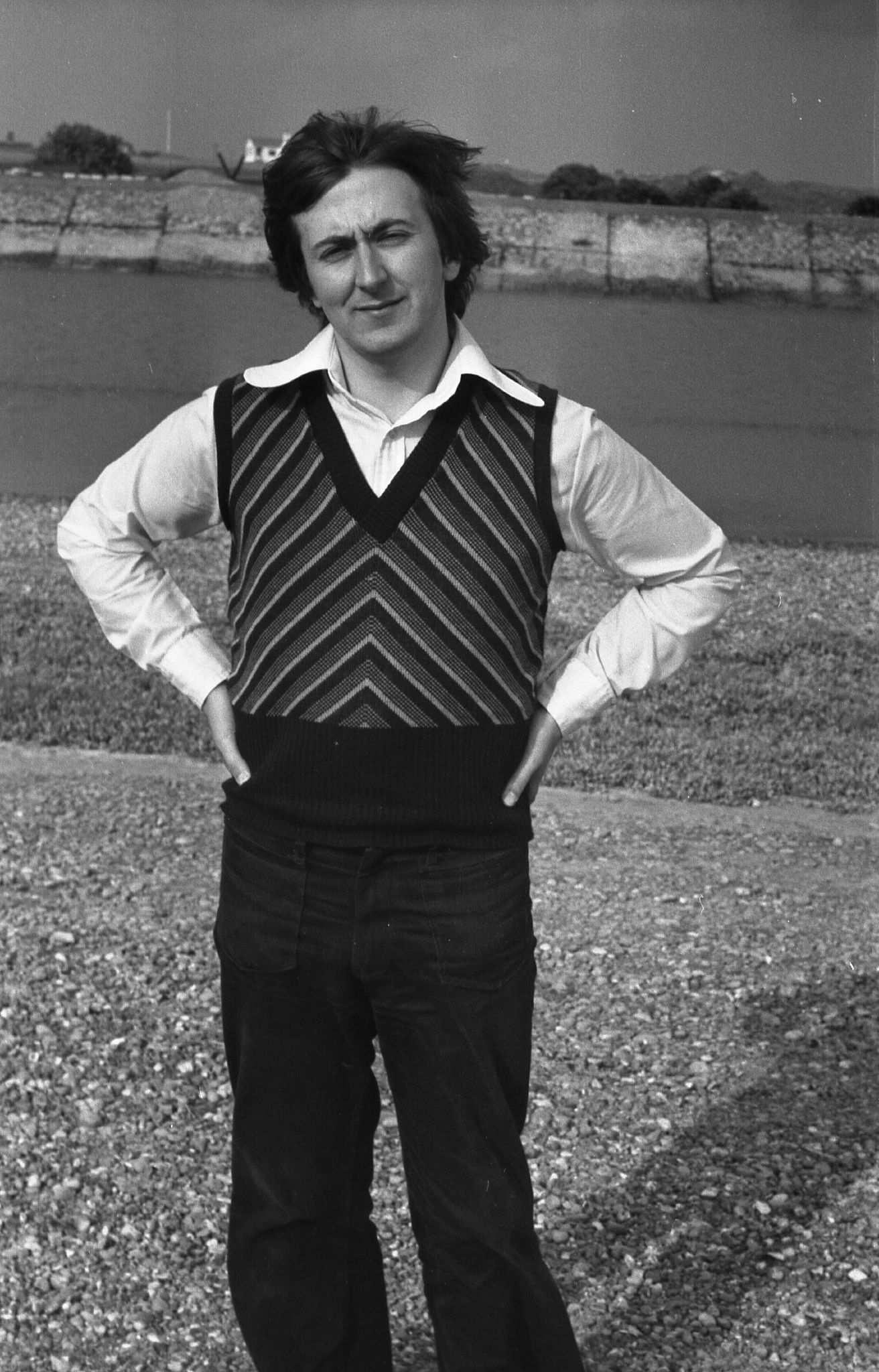
Man wearing a striped sweater vest (1974)

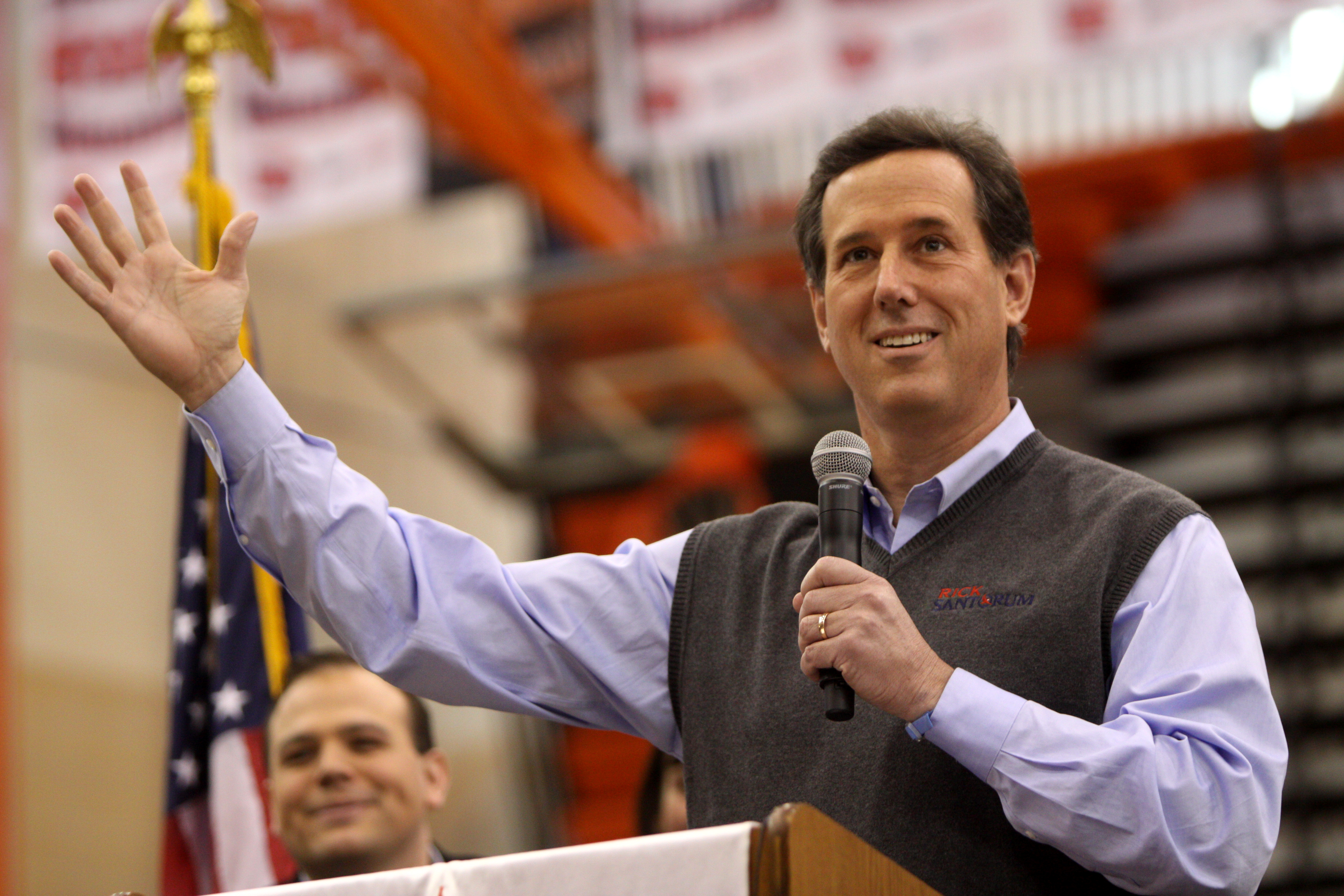
Rick Santorum wearing a sweater vest (2012)

A sweater vest (known as a tank top, sleeveless jumper, sleeveless sweater, sleeveless pullover or slipover in the UK and historically spencer in the countries of the Commonwealth—spencer persists in Dutch language today), is an item of knitwear that is similar to a sweater, but without sleeves, usually with a low-cut neckline. They were popular in the 20th century, particularly in the 1970s in the UK, and are again growing in popularity in the 21st century.

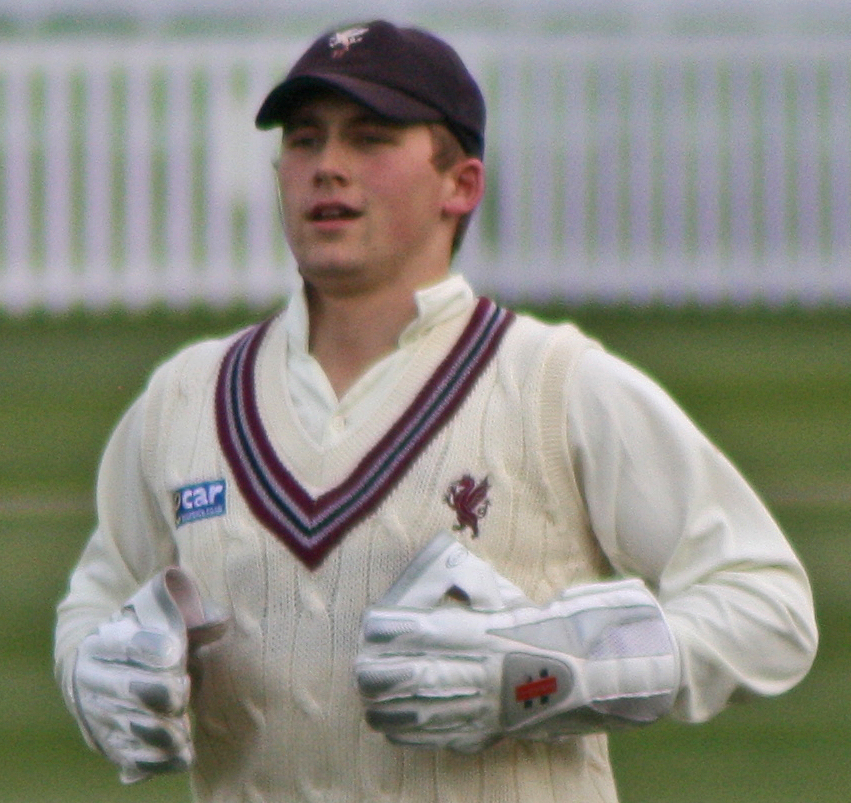
Cable knit sweater vest typically worn by cricketers

== Fashion ==
Sweater vests are popular among sports fans, particularly those who play golf. Those with sports team logos, especially NFL and college teams, are also popular and are frequently worn by American football coaches, most notably Jim Tressel, who has been given the nickname "The Sweater Vest" by fans despite the garment's origins at rival Michigan Wolverines.
