= Ohio State University football scandal =

Incident involving the Ohio State Buckeyes football team

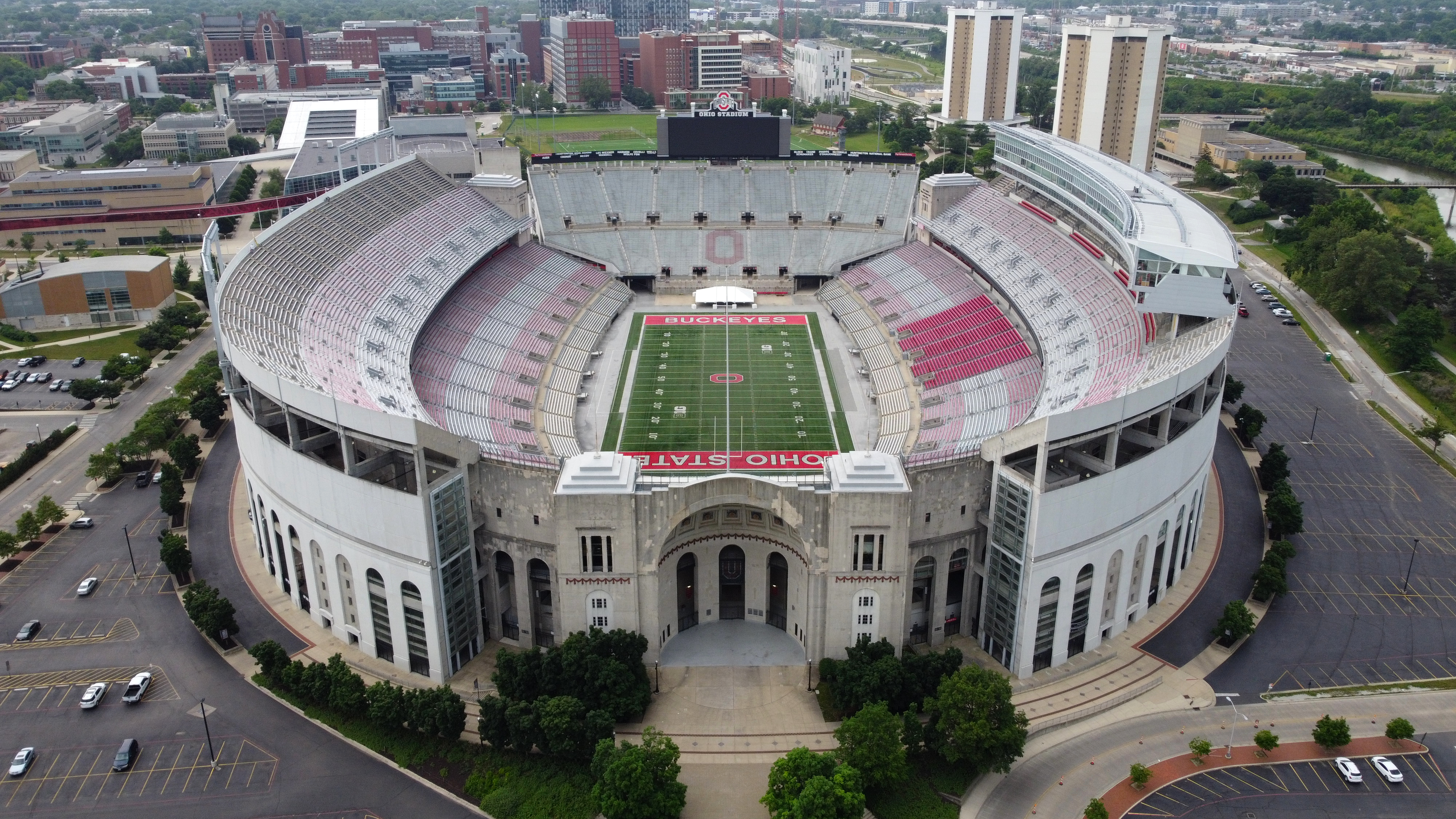
Ohio Stadium is the home of Ohio State Buckeyes football.

The Ohio State University football scandal (also known as Tattoogate) concerned NCAA rules violations and other incidents committed in 2010 by the Ohio State Buckeyes football team during the tenure of former head coach Jim Tressel. The investigation was joined by the NCAA, the FBI, and the US Department of Justice. As a result of the investigation, Ohio State's football program was punished with sanctions.

The sanctions were announced on July 8, 2011, and affected the Ohio State football program from 2011 to 2015. The punishment involved Ohio State vacating all wins from the 2010 season (including the 2011 Sugar Bowl win), a postseason ban in 2012, two years of NCAA probation, a five-year show cause for head coach Jim Tressel, and a reduction of five scholarships over three years. Tressel would resign from Ohio State as a result of the scandal.

== Background ==
The scandal began when five players – Terrelle Pryor, Devier Posey, Mike Adams, Solomon Thomas, and Boom Herron – were suspended by the NCAA on December 22, 2010 for the first five games of the 2011 season for receiving improper benefits from the owner of a tattoo parlor. However, the players were allowed to participate in the upcoming Sugar Bowl game against Arkansas. The suspensions resulted from an incident where the players received tattoos for autographs. The players also sold several items given to them by the university, including Big Ten championship rings, jerseys, and other football-related awards for tattoos. Head coach Jim Tressel denied any involvement and knowledge of the players committing these violations.

The scandal originated from Fine Line Tattoos and Piercings in Columbus. The owner of the parlor, Edward Rife, was being investigated by the FBI for felony drug trafficking. Tressel was first notified of the arrangement in April 2010 when he received several emails from Chris Cicero, a local attorney and former Ohio State football player. It was later revealed that Cicero had warned Tressel that he could not tell anyone the information, as it was sealed as part of a grand jury investigation.

Tressel never forwarded the emails, nor the information contained in them about potential violations, to his school's compliance office or the NCAA. The US Department of Justice notified Ohio State that at least six current players, including Pryor, had traded team memorabilia for tattoos or cash at the parlor. Sports Illustrated found evidence that the cash for memorabilia scandal dated back to Ohio State’s 2002 national championship team, and that as many as 28 players were involved. Sports Illustrated also discovered allegations that Ohio State players had traded memorabilia for marijuana.

Records of roughly 50 cars owned by current and former Ohio State football players, including Pryor, were also investigated. Multiple media outlets including ESPN reported that Pryor was driving with a suspended license. Pryor was seen driving a Nissan 350Z to team meetings and workouts.

On January 3, 2011, Tressel's email exchanges with Cicero were leaked to the university. On January 16, Tressel confessed that he had not shared the violations committed by the players out of concern for their well-being. On March 8, Ohio State suspended Tressel for the first two games of the 2011 season and fined him $250,000 for not informing the university of NCAA violations and denying knowledge of the players receiving improper benefits. Tressel's suspension would later be increased to five games by the university. However, Ohio State president Gordon Gee assured Tressel that he would not be fired.

On April 25, 2011, the NCAA accused Tressel of withholding information. In their notice of allegations sent to Ohio State, the NCAA stated that Tressel's actions were considered "potential major violations" which had "permitted football student-athletes to participate in intercollegiate athletics while ineligible." The report also said he "failed to comport himself ... (with) honesty and integrity." Tressel claimed that he lied about the violations because he didn't want to jeopardize the FBI's investigation into Rife and that he feared for his players' safety. On May 30, Tressel resigned as Ohio State's head coach. On June 8, Terrelle Pryor announced that he would forgo playing his senior year as a result of the scandal.

== Punishment ==
The NCAA issued sanctions against Ohio State on July 8, 2011. Ohio State was forced to vacate all wins from the 2010 season (including the 2011 Sugar Bowl win), they were issued a postseason ban for the 2012 season, two years of NCAA probation, a five-year show cause for Jim Tressel, and a reduction of five scholarships over three years.

== Criticism of sanctions ==
These sanctions have been criticized by college football writers, and there have been calls for the NCAA to reinstate the Buckeyes' wins due to new NIL rules. Terrelle Pryor has called on the NCAA to reinstate their wins from the 2010 season, stating that "The affirmation of NCAA athletes’ rights to make a living from their name, image and likeness is a huge step in the right direction. Armed with the correct resources and support, we know they'll show what we felt to be true all along – not letting athletes capitalize on what ultimately is their hard work was unjust and unnecessary. Now that fundamental right has been granted to a new generation of athletes. Now that they finally have the freedom to share in some of the millions of dollars in revenue they generate for their coaches, their institutions, their conferences and the NCAA as a whole, we would like to see our hard won accomplishments reinstated."

In May 2022, the Ohio House of Representatives adopted a non-unanimous symbolic resolution calling on the NCAA to reinstate the team's wins and records. Ryan Fagan of The Sporting News has also called on the NCAA to reinstate Ohio State's wins due to the new NIL rules, stating that "it’s a frustrating change for certain fan bases that have seen their favorite programs dragged through the NCAA mud for violations that were ridiculous when they happened and would be fully legal and above board now."

== See also ==
- 2015 University of Louisville basketball sex scandal
- University of Southern California athletics scandal
- University of Minnesota basketball scandal
- University of Michigan football sign-stealing scandal
- WakeyLeaks
- Jim O'Brien and NCAA violations
