= 2006 Ohio State Buckeyes football team =

American college football season

2006 Ohio State Buckeyes football

Big Ten champion

BCS National Championship Game, L 14–41 vs. Florida
- Conference: Big Ten Conference

Ranking
- Coaches: No. 2
- AP: No. 2
- Record: 12–1 (8–0 Big Ten)
- Head coach: Jim Tressel (6th season)
- Offensive coordinator: Jim Bollman (6th season)
- Offensive scheme: Multiple
- Defensive coordinator: Jim Heacock (2nd season)
- Co-defensive coordinator: Luke Fickell (2nd season)
- Base defense: 4–3
- Captain: 4: Troy Smith; Quinn Pitcock; David Patterson; Doug Datish
- Home stadium: Ohio Stadium

2006 Big Ten Conference football standings
	Conf.			Overall
Team	W		L	W		L
No. 2 Ohio State $	8	–	0	12	–	1
No. 8 Michigan %	7	–	1	11	–	2
No. 7 Wisconsin	7	–	1	12	–	1
No. 24 Penn State	5	–	3	9	–	4
Purdue	5	–	3	8	–	6
Minnesota	3	–	5	6	–	7
Indiana	3	–	5	5	–	7
Northwestern	2	–	6	4	–	8
Iowa	2	–	6	6	–	7
Illinois	1	–	7	2	–	10
Michigan State	1	–	7	4	–	8
$ – BCS representative as conference champion; % – BCS at-large representative; Rankings from AP Poll

The 2006 Ohio State Buckeyes football team was an American football team that represented the Ohio State University as a member of the Big Ten Conference during the 2006 NCAA Division I FBS football season. In their sixth year under head coach Jim Tressel, the Buckeyes compiled a 12–1 record (8–0 in conference games), won the Big Ten championship, and outscored opponents by a total of 450 to 166. Ranked No. 1 from the beginning of the season, the Buckeyes' notable games included victories over No. 2 Texas and No. 2 Michigan. Their sole loss was to national champion Florida in the 2007 BCS National Championship Game. The Buckeyes were ranked No. 2 in the final AP and Coaches polls.

Quarterback Troy Smith won the Heisman Trophy (best player in college football), the Davey O'Brien Award (best quarterback in college football), and the Chicago Tribune Silver Football (best player in Big Ten). He received the highest percentage of first-place votes in Heisman voting history to that point. He tallied 2,379 passing yards and led the Big Ten in completion percentage (63.9%) and passer efficiency rating (148.9).

The team's other statistical leaders included running back Beanie Wells (1,609 rushing yards, 5.9 yards per carry), wide receiver Brian Robiskie (55 receptions for 935 yards), kicker Ryan Pretorious (102 points, 48 of 49 extra points, 18 of 23 field goals), and linebacker James Laurinaitis (121 total tackles). Laurinaitis won the Bronko Nagurski Trophy as the best defensive player in college football. Three Ohio State players were selected as consensus first-team All-Americans: Troy Smith; Laurinitis; and defensive tackle Quinn Pitcock.

The team played its home games at Ohio Stadium in Columbus, Ohio.

== Schedule ==
Date	Time	Opponent	Rank	Site	TV	Result	Attendance
September 2	3:30 p.m.	Northern Illinois*	No. 1	Ohio Stadium; Columbus, OH	ABC	W 35–12	103,896
September 9	8:00 p.m.	at No. 2 Texas*	No. 1	Darrell K Royal–Texas Memorial Stadium; Austin, TX (College GameDay)	ABC	W 24–7	89,422
September 16	12:00 p.m.	Cincinnati*	No. 1	Ohio Stadium; Columbus, OH	ESPN Plus	W 37–7	105,037
September 23	3:30 p.m.	No. 24 Penn State	No. 1	Ohio Stadium; Columbus, OH (rivalry, College GameDay)	ABC	W 28–6	105,266
September 30	8:00 p.m.	at No. 13 Iowa	No. 1	Kinnick Stadium; Iowa City, IA (College GameDay)	ABC	W 38–17	70,585
October 7	3:30 p.m.	Bowling Green*	No. 1	Ohio Stadium; Columbus, OH	ESPN Plus	W 35–7	105,057
October 14	3:30 p.m.	at Michigan State	No. 1	Spartan Stadium; East Lansing, MI	ABC	W 38–7	73,498
October 21	12:00 p.m.	Indiana	No. 1	Ohio Stadium; Columbus, OH	ESPNU	W 44–3	105,267
October 28	3:30 p.m.	Minnesota^{†}	No. 1	Ohio Stadium; Columbus, OH	ABC	W 44–0	105,443
November 4	3:30 p.m.	at Illinois	No. 1	Memorial Stadium; Champaign, IL (Illibuck)	ESPN2	W 17–10	53,351
November 11	3:30 p.m.	at Northwestern	No. 1	Ryan Field; Evanston, IL	ABC	W 54–10	47,130
November 18	3:30 p.m.	No. 2 Michigan	No. 1	Ohio Stadium; Columbus, OH (rivalry, College GameDay)	ABC	W 42–39	105,708
January 8, 2007	8:00 p.m.	vs. No. 2 Florida*	No. 1	University of Phoenix Stadium; Glendale, AZ (BCS National Championship Game, College GameDay)	FOX	L 14–41	74,628
*Non-conference game; ^{†}Homecoming; Rankings from AP Poll released prior to the game; All times are in Eastern time

== Rankings ==
Following their victory over arch-rival Michigan on November 18, Ohio State became the first team ever to score a perfect 1.000 in the BCS composite score.

Ranking movements Legend: ██ Increase in ranking ██ Decrease in ranking ( ) = First-place votes
	Week															
Poll	Pre	1	2	3	4	5	6	7	8	9	10	11	12	13	14	Final
AP	1 (35)	1 (39)	1 (59)	1 (59)	1 (59)	1 (62)	1 (63)	1 (63)	1 (63)	1 (63)	1 (65)	1 (64)	1 (65)	1 (65)	1 (65)	2
Coaches	1	1 (28)	1 (41)	1 (59)	1 (60)	1 (59)	1 (62)	1 (63)	1 (63)	1 (63)	1 (63)	1 (62)	1 (63)	1 (63)	1 (62)	2
Harris	Not released				1 (107)	1 (110)	1 (112)	1 (112)	1 (112)	1 (113)	1 (113)	1 (112)	1 (114)	1 (114)	1 (112)	Not released
BCS	Not released							1	1	1	1	1	1	1	1	Not released

== Preseason ==
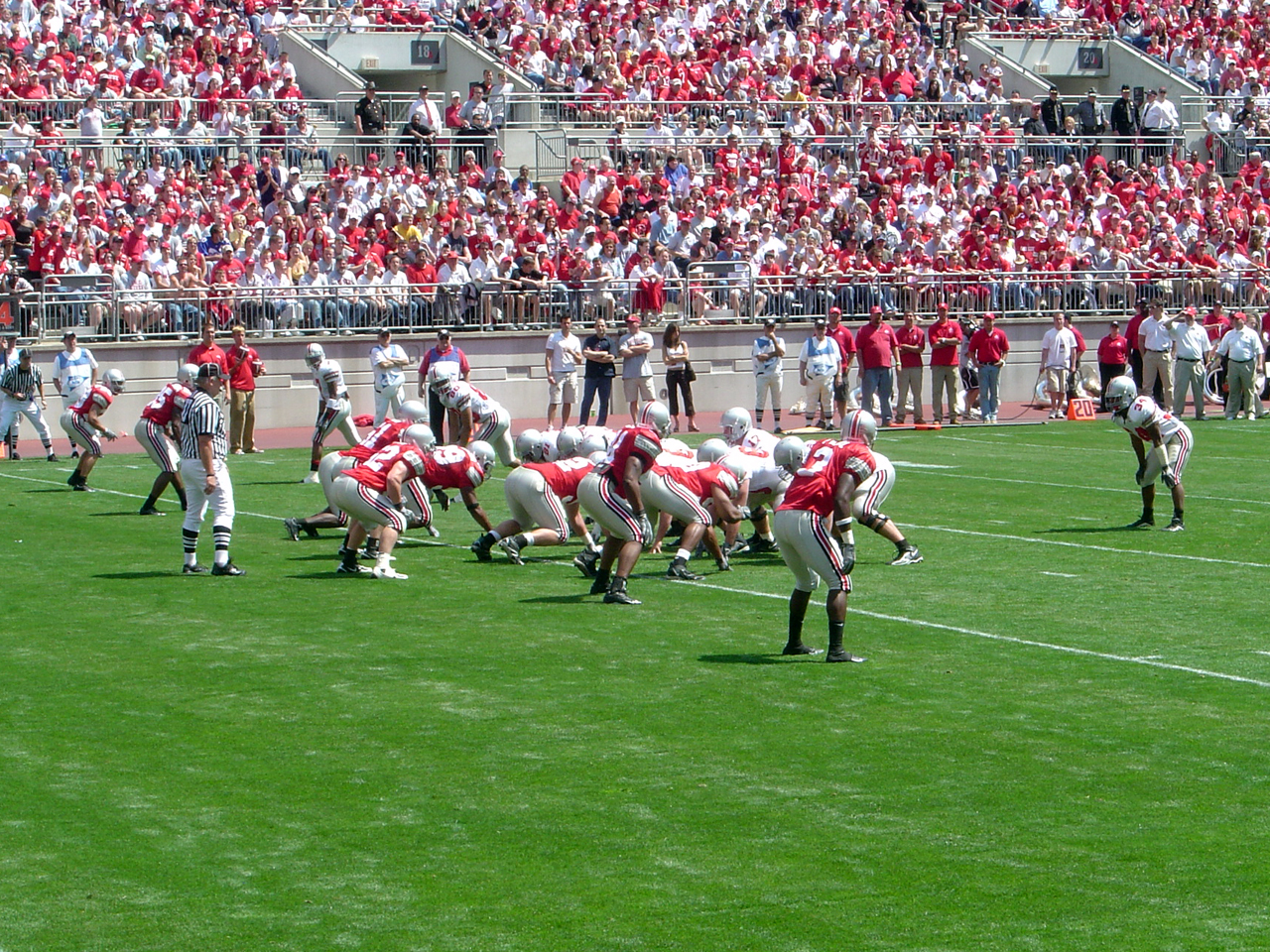
The Scarlet & Gray scrimmage during the summer.

Head coach Jim Tressel was signed to a contract extension through the 2012 season.

In August, Ohio State was named the No. 1 team by the coaches' poll. Terry Bowden, a sports broadcaster and former coach, named Ohio State No. 1 in his preseason Sweet 16 rankings and stated Troy Smith and Ted Ginn Jr. were Heisman Trophy hopefuls. Ohio State thus garnered pre-season number one from USA Today, the Associated Press, Sports Illustrated, and ESPN The Magazine.

On August 9, 2006, the OSU Athletic Department announced the season-long suspension of junior tight end Marcel Frost by Coach Tressel for unspecified violations of team rules. The suspension resulted in the elevation of sophomore Rory Nicol to the top of the depth chart as the only tight end with significant game experience. Nicol played as a true freshman but missed most of 2005 with a broken right foot. Sophomore Brandon Smith, a former linebacker moved to tight end as a freshman in 2005, moves to second on the depth chart. Frost subsequently announced his transfer to Jackson State, joining former Buckeye Erik Haw.

Team captains were announced August 25, 2006. Defensive captains named were seniors Quinn Pitcock and David Patterson. Offensive captains were seniors Troy Smith and Doug Datish.

On August 30, Jim Tressel announced the awarding of scholarships to four former walk-ons—senior WR Derek Harden, senior fullback Ryan Franzinger, RS junior fullback and wedge buster Trever Robinson, and RS sophomore center Tyler "Tank" Whaley.

These scholarships were freed due to the departures of Sirjo Welch (grades), Chad Hoobler (transferred to Ashland), Devon Jordan (injuries) and the aforementioned Marcel Frost. Mike Roberts (transferred to Indiana State) and Sian Cotton (grades) also left the program earlier in the year.

On August 31, 2006, senior linebacker Mike D'Andrea underwent knee surgery and was declared out for the season.

== Game summaries ==
=== Ohio State 35, Northern Illinois 12 ===
	1	2	3	4	Total
Northern Illinois	0	3	3	6	12
Ohio State	21	7	0	7	35

All-time record against Northern Illinois: 1–0–0 (first meeting)

Ohio State's offense scored the first four times it had the ball, rolling up 28 points in the first 15:05 of the game. After moving out to a big lead, the Buckeyes rotated a number of players in and out of the game on both offense and defense en route to an easy 35–12 opening game victory.

Northern Illinois running back Garrett Wolfe gained 285 of the Huskies' 343 total yards, including 171 rushing yard, while touching the ball on half of Northern Illinois's offensive plays. Except for Wolfe, the Huskies were ineffective on offense, converting only one out of thirteen third downs. The Buckeye defense, which featured five first-time starters, sacked Huskie quarterbacks Phil Horvath and Dan Nicholson four times and intercepted Horvath once.

On offense, Troy Smith completed 18 of 25 passes for 297 yards and three touchdowns. Ted Ginn Jr. had four receptions for 123 yards and two touchdowns, including a 58-yard score. Anthony Gonzalez tallied four receptions for 53 yards and a touchdown. Running back Antonio Pittman carried the ball 19 times for 111 yards and a touchdown, while true freshman Beanie Wells, in his first game as a Buckeye, carried the ball 10 times for 50 yards and a touchdown. The Buckeyes' 488 yards of total offense were marred by two fumbles lost inside the Huskie ten-yard line and a pair of missed field goal attempts by Ohio State kickers.

Smith was named Big Ten Offensive Player of the Week for his performance.

=== Ohio State 24, Texas 7 ===
	1	2	3	4	Total
Ohio State	7	7	3	7	24
Texas	0	7	0	0	7

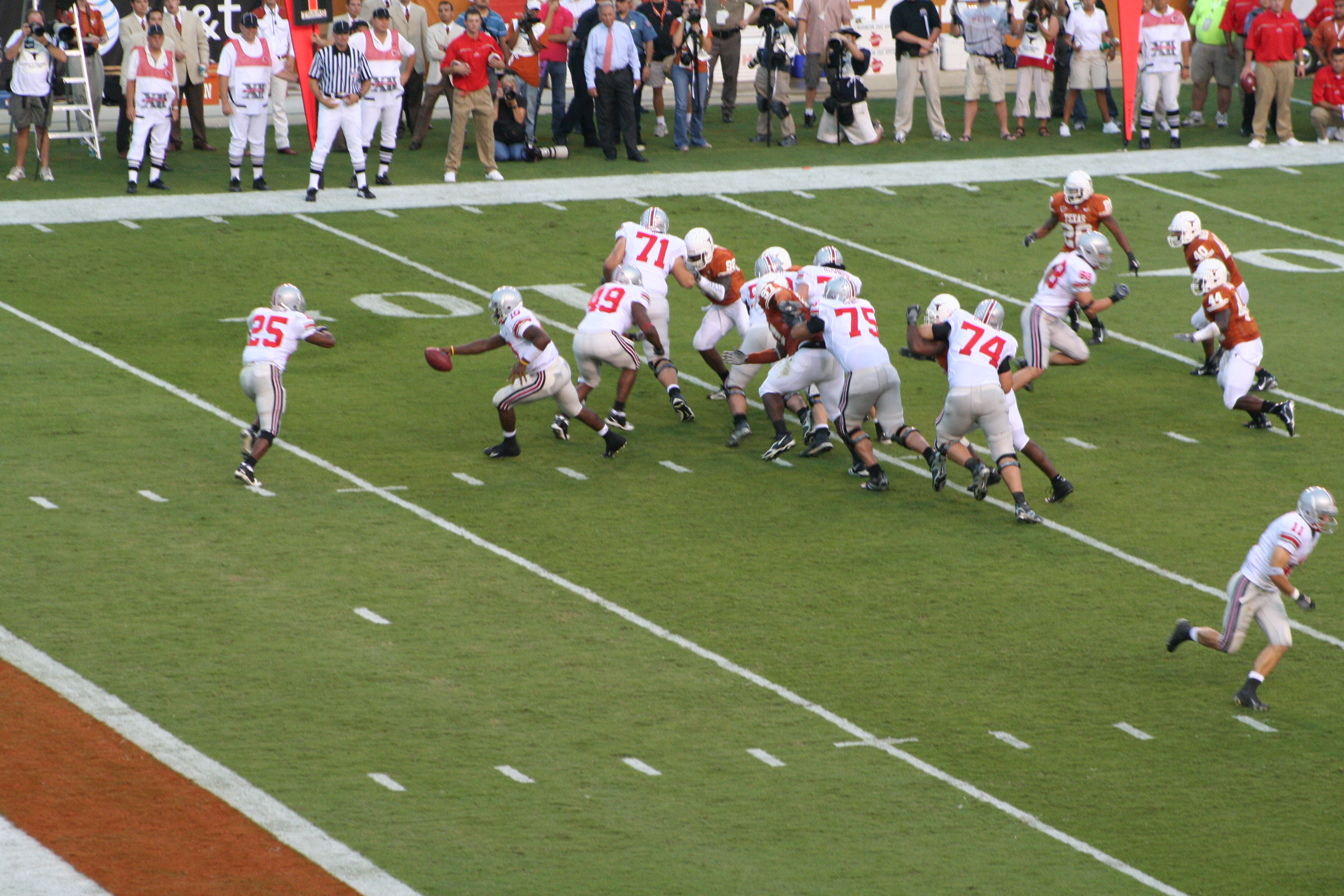
Ohio State's Troy Smith hands off to Antonio Pittman

All-time record against Texas: 0-1–0

Ohio State employed an effective vertical passing game in the first half and a relentless ball control offense in the second half, coupled with a defense that improved in both efficiency and stamina as the game progressed, to beat second-ranked Texas, 24–7, in Darrell K Royal–Texas Memorial Stadium, Austin. Quarterback Troy Smith, well protected by the Buckeye offensive line, threw for 269 yards and two touchdowns without an interception, directing a 10-play 72-yard drive in the fourth quarter that took 5:47 off the clock and secured the win. Although the teams were nearly equal in yardage (348 Ohio State to 326 Texas) and first downs (20–17 in favor of Texas), Ohio State did not turn the ball over and converted a recovered fumble and a Colt McCoy interception, both forced by linebacker James Laurinaitis, into 10 points.

Standouts for Ohio State were Anthony Gonzalez, who made eight catches for 142 yards and a touchdown, and Ted Ginn Jr., who caught 5 passes for 97 yards including a 29-yard touchdown late in the first half that countered the lone score by the Longhorns. Antonio Pittman rushed for 74 yards on 16 carries and scored the final touchdown. Punter A. J. Trapasso was particularly effective; his six punts averaged 50.8 yards a kick and won Ohio State the battle for field position. Texas had two streaks ended by the loss: a 12-game streak in which it had scored at least 40 points a game (and averaged 52), and a 21-game winning streak.

Laurinaitis and Trapasso were named Big Ten Defensive and Special Teams Players of the Week, respectively. Laurinaitis also received national recognition for Player of the Week honors from the Walter Camp Foundation and as the Football Writers Association of America-Bronko Nagurski National Defensive Player of the Week.

=== Ohio State 37, Cincinnati 7 ===
	1	2	3	4	Total
Cincinnati	7	0	0	0	7
Ohio State	3	10	7	17	37

All-time record against Cincinnati: 12–3–0

Ohio State overcame a slow start, three quarters without much offensive rhythm, and a good Cincinnati defensive game plan that employed stunting and looping its quick linemen to blow out the Bearcats in the fourth quarter, 37–7. Cincinnati scored on its second possession of the game, driving 80 yards in five plays and capping the drive with a 22-yard pass from Dustin Grutza to Jared Martin. However, despite allowing a number of long gains on broken plays, Ohio State effectively stopped Cincinnati's offense after the scoring drive, accumulating eight sacks, three interceptions, and holding the Bearcats to 212 total yards and −4 rushing yards. Cincinnati's longest gain on the ground was a 23-yard scramble by Grutza on its touchdown drive.

Ohio State, after kicking a field goal on its opening series, trailed most of the first half until an 80-yard drive midway through the second quarter ended in a 12-yard touchdown pass from Troy Smith to Ted Ginn Jr. on a crossing pattern with three minutes remaining. The offense again started slowly in the second half until effective rushing by Antonio Pittman, including a 48-yard sprint for a touchdown, put the game away. Justin Zwick entered the game at quarterback and effectively led a scoring drive, and late in the game third and fourth-string quarterbacks Todd Boeckman and Rob Schoenhoft took snaps. For the game, Ohio State outgained Cincinnati 444 yards to 212, made 22 first downs to Cincinnati's 11, and scored all four times it had the ball in the red zone.

Troy Smith completed 21 of his 30 passing attempts without an interception, producing 203 yards and two touchdowns, both to Ginn. He was sacked once for a loss of five yards. Zwick was two for three and 63 yards. Eleven receivers caught passes for the Buckeyes, with Anthony Gonzalez catching five for 85 yards and several key first downs, and Ginn five for 33 yards. Pittman finished the day with 155 yards on 16 carries. On defense Quinn Pitcock recorded three sacks and penetrated the Cincinnati backfield the entire game. James Laurinaitis led in tackles with nine, including a sack, and intercepted his second pass of the season. Ohio State played sixty-one players. Aaron Pettrey was named Big Ten Special Teams Player of the Week for his two field goals, ten points, and five kickoffs for touchbacks.

=== Ohio State 28, Penn State 6 ===
	1	2	3	4	Total
Penn State	0	3	0	3	6
Ohio State	0	0	7	21	28

All-time record against Penn State: 11–11–0

The game was even in all but the score. However Ohio State made all the big plays to overcome a strong defensive effort by Penn State and win going away, 28–6. First downs were 16 to 14 in favor of Penn State, rushing yardage 142 to 138 (PSU), and passing yardage 106 to 115 (Ohio State). Penn State intercepted two passes and Ohio State three. Tony Hunt with four more carries outrushed Antonio Pittman, 138 yards to 110, and Troy Smith (12 of 22 passing) was virtually even with Anthony Morelli in passing statistics. However, Ohio State recorded the only three sacks of the day, stopped Penn State twice inside the ten-yard line, and the defense scored two touchdowns in a second half where the momentum gradually shifted from the Nittany Lions to the Buckeyes.

The game was played in a persistent, sometimes heavy rain, but field conditions were not a factor. The 1st quarter ended scoreless as James Laurinaitis grabbed his third interception of the season to stop a PSU drive but the Buckeyes squandered the opportunity with a missed field goal by Aaron Pettrey. Penn State took the ball at its 30 with six minutes left in the first half and with the aid of a pass interference penalty drove to the Ohio State 7. The Buckeyes held at the 3, but committed a penalty on a missed field goal attempt, giving the Nittany Lions a second chance on an untimed down. Kevin Kelly converted this second chance and PSU led at the half 3–0.

The 3rd quarter started disastrously for Ohio State as Penn State intercepted Troy Smith at the OSU 26 on the third play of the half. The Lions gained only a single yard, however, and missed a field goal. The series seemed to energize the Buckeyes, and they drove the length of the field to take the lead. Pittman made 60 of the 75 yards, including the last 12 for the score, on three carries and a screen pass. Early in the fourth quarter, Troy Smith threw a 37-yard pass from to sophomore wide receiver Brian Robiskie to avoid a sack. Despite the ball being thrown as what is known as "up for grabs", luck was on Ohio State's side for that drive.

Penn State answered with a long drive from its own 20, aided by a pair of Buckeye penalties after the defense had apparently killed the drive. But the Bucks stopped PSU at the 1, directly in front of the student section, and the Lion offensive line moved before the snap on a 4th-and-goal attempt. After the penalty Penn State again settled for a field goal and this appeared to be the defining moment that shifted the momentum towards Ohio State. In the final two minutes, Penn State put together a strong drive in an attempt to regain control over the game, but this was ended with the first of two interceptions. The Buckeyes intercepted a possible scoring pass and ran it for a touchdown. Buckeye defensive backs Malcolm Jenkins and Antonio Smith each scored on long interception returns a minute and fourteen seconds apart to complete the victory. Antonio Pittman scored a touchdown for the ninth game in a row and Ohio State won its eleventh straight, which, with TCU’s loss to BYU on September 28, becomes the longest active win streak in Division I-A.

Many Penn State fans have expressed sentiments that critical mistakes are what doomed Penn State in this close game. Those mistakes being the interceptions, missed field goals, and the false start penalty at 4th and 1.

=== Ohio State 38, Iowa 17 ===
	1	2	3	4	Total
Ohio State	7	14	7	10	38
Iowa	3	7	0	7	17

All-time record against Iowa: 44–14–3

Ohio State, in what was widely described by television pundits afterwards as a “statement game,” trounced 13th-ranked Iowa 38–17 in Kinnick Stadium in Iowa City. It was the second win on the road in four weeks over a ranked team for the Buckeyes, who won their 12th game in a row to lead Division I-A in active win streaks. Leading 21–10 at halftime, the Buckeyes scored on the first possession of the second half, ending with a spectacular catch-and-run touchdown by Anthony Gonzalez from the Iowa 30 in which he cut back, balancing on one hand, and maneuvered through tacklers on the sideline. The Buckeyes kept the ball for the entire 3rd quarter except one brief Hawkeye possession, and accumulated an overwhelming 40:30 to 19:30 advantage in time of possession. Their aggressive defense took the ball away four times on three interceptions and a forced fumble, while Ohio State never turned the ball over. For the second straight season the Buckeye defense harried Hawkeye quarterback Drew Tate into one of his worst performances.

Ohio State stopped Iowa on three-and-out after the opening kickoff, then drove the field on its first possession to lead 7–0 and quiet a record Kinnick Stadium crowd overwhelmingly dressed in gold. Iowa reached the Ohio State 14 on the ensuing possession but was forced to settle for a field goal. The teams traded touchdowns in the second quarter, which was as close as Iowa got in the game, before the Buckeyes scored just before the half. Iowa scored quickly at the start of the 4th quarter to narrow a three-touchdown deficit to 14 points, but Ohio State responded with a pair of interceptions of Drew Tate that put the game away.

Statistically Ohio State racked up 400 yards of balanced offense with 214 yards rushing and 186 passing, but had an impressive 2—1 ratio of run-to-pass, with 50 rushes and 25 passes. The defense held Iowa to 87 yards rushing and limited Tate to 249 passing (Tate completed 19 of 41 attempts), but did yield its first rushing touchdown on the 2006 season.

Standout players offense for the Buckeyes were quarterback Troy Smith, who completed 16 of 25 attempts for 4 touchdowns and rushed for 20 yards; tailback Antonio Pittman, who rushed for 117 yards on 25 carries and scored in his tenth straight game; freshman tailback Chris “Beanie” Wells, 14 carries for 78 yards rushing; wide receiver Gonzalez, 5 receptions for 77 yards and two touchdowns; Ted Ginn Jr.. five catches for 69 yards; and wide receivers Roy Hall and Brian Robiskie, who each caught a touchdown pass. On defense, linebacker James Laurinaitis intercepted a pass in his fourth consecutive game and registered a sack, linebacker Marcus Freeman also had a sack and an interception, and safety Brandon Mitchell intercepted a pass and recovered a fumble by Iowa tight end Scott Chandler. Freshman wide receiver Brian Hartline delivered a devastating block downfield on two Iowa defensive linemen on Gonzalez's catch-and-run. Although a deep Buckeye defense adjusted well, starting freshman safety Anderson Russell suffered a season-ending knee injury on kickoff coverage in the 1st quarter.

=== Ohio State 35, Bowling Green 7 ===
	1	2	3	4	Total
Bowling Green	0	0	7	0	7
Ohio State	14	7	0	14	35

All-time record against Bowling Green: 4–0–0

Ohio State easily defeated the Bowling Green Falcons in Ohio Stadium for their 13th straight win. Troy Smith completed 85% of his passes for three touchdowns and Antonio Pittman scored two others rushing. Ohio State led 21–0 at the half, and while the Falcons took the second half kickoff and completed an 8½-minute drive for a touchdown, the game was never in doubt. The Buckeyes replied with a 7-minute scoring drive, then after forcing BG to punt, Ted Ginn made his first significant return of the season to the OSU 43. On the next play Smith completed a long pass to Ginn for the final touchdown.

In addition to Smith's 191 passing yards, Justin Zwick saw playing time in both halves, completing 4 of his 9 passes for 57 yards. Ginn had his best day as a receiver in 2006, catching 10 passes for 122 yards. Senior Roy Hall caught four passes for 50 yards. On defense, Ohio State adjusted to the Falcons' first use of a variation of Nevada’s “pistol offense” (a shotgun variant with a running back lined up behind the QB); BGSU produced a balanced mix of pass and run (179 yards and 160 yards), but 85 yards came on one drive and 54 of the rushing yards on a single run in the 4th quarter when both teams were playing their second strings. Freshman Kurt Coleman blocked a field goal attempt in the first half. Sophomore defensive end Vernon Gholston was a standout on defense, including a pass interception. Backup defensive back Andre Amos also made an interception late in the game on a 4th down play that replay officials bizarrely chose to review and reverse, even though the ball was Ohio State's either way and no one had challenged the ruling.

The win was Ohio State's 13th in a row since it resumed playing in-state opponents in 1997, and 29th straight in-state victory. The last Buckeye loss to an Ohio team was to Oberlin College in 1921.

Smith was named Co-Offensive Player of the Week by the Big Ten. His game quarterback rating of 214.7 against BGSU raised his career rating to 158.1, the highest in Big Ten history.

=== Ohio State 38, Michigan State 7 ===
	1	2	3	4	Total
Ohio State	7	17	7	7	38
Michigan State	0	0	0	7	7

All-time record against Michigan State: 25–12–0

Ohio State performed well in almost all facets of the game and defeated Michigan State 38–7. Both offense and defense performed at high levels, and the only Michigan State score (and 69 of its 198 yards) came against the OSU reserves, with a minute to play.

Ohio State fumbled the ball at its own 31 to Michigan State on its opening series but James Laurinaitis sacked Drew Stanton on third down and forced a Spartan punt. The Buckeyes then drove for the opening touchdown, with Antonio Pittman scoring in his 12th straight game. The Buckeyes scored 17 points in the 2nd quarter, including a 60-yard punt return for a touchdown by Ted Ginn, his 6th career punt return for touchdown, establishing a new B-10 career record. The legitimacy of this record has been called into question after sports commentators noticed that there was an illegal block in the back penalty during that punt return that was not called. (If the call had been made there would have been no effect to the outcome of the game, but to the record only.) Marcus Freeman intercepted a pass at the Spartan 39 with 2 minutes remaining in the half, and the Buckeyes converted it for a score with a pass from Troy Smith to Anthony Gonzalez reminiscent of “The Catch” to lead 24–0.

Ohio State controlled the game with defense in the second half, although offensively the 3rd quarter was highlighted by back-to-back end-arounds by Gonzalez and Ginn, gaining 41 yards. Smith escaped a leg tackle by a Spartan defender and threw a touchdown pass to Brian Robiskie, and Chris Wells completed the Buckeye scoring with a touchdown run at the beginning of the 4th quarter. Statistically, Ohio State was balanced on offense, with 10 first downs each rushing and passing, and 182 of its 421 yards on the ground. Smith was 15 of 22 for 234 yards; Wells rushed for 53 and Pittman for 48; and Gonzalez had 7 receptions for 118 yards. The Buckeyes also had an 8-minute edge in time of possession. The defense had four sacks in addition to the interception, and ten tackles for loss, with Quinn Pitcock (3 solo tackles, including 2 sacks) and Jay Richardson (4 solo tackles) having outstanding days.

Ted Ginn was named Big Ten Special Teams Player of the Week.

=== Ohio State 44, Indiana 3 ===
	1	2	3	4	Total
Indiana	3	0	0	0	3
Ohio State	7	21	10	6	44

All-time record against Indiana: 65–12–5

Ohio State spotted Indiana an early 3–0 lead, then crushed the Hoosiers with seven unanswered scoring drives to win 44–3.

In an early struggle for field position, Indiana pinned the Buckeyes inside their own 10 and forced a punt to midfield which was returned to the Ohio State 15. The defense held, forcing a field goal, a lead that held up until two minutes left in the quarter, when Troy Smith capped a long drive with a scoring pass to tight end Rory Nicol. Smith went on to throw four touchdown passes on a 15 for 23 day passing, and wide receiver Ted Ginn also completed a touchdown pass to Nicol. Chris Wells scored the sixth Buckeye touchdown on a 12-yard run in the fourth quarter, and Aaron Pettrey added a 51-yard field goal. In addition to Nicol, tight end Jake Ballard caught a pass for a score, as did both Ginn and Anthony Gonzalez. The defense, which again moved into first place in NCAA I-A scoring defense, was highlighted by Antonio Smith, who had 11 solo tackles (12 overall), four for losses including a sack, and a forced fumble. Malcolm Jenkins and Andre Amos each intercepted passes, and Jay Richardson recorded two of the Buckeyes' four sacks.

Ohio State had a perfectly balanced offense for the game, accruing 270 yards both passing and rushing. Antonio Pittman's scoring streak ended at 12 games but he rushed for 105 yards to lead all rushers. The defense allowed only 158 yards passing and 7 rushing, and Ohio State won its 15th straight game and 10th at home.

Troy Smith was named co-Big Ten Player of the Week on offense (with Drew Stanton), and Antonio Smith on defense (shared with Paul Posluszny).

=== Ohio State 44, Minnesota 0 ===
	1	2	3	4	Total
Minnesota	0	0	0	0	0
Ohio State	10	7	13	14	44

All-time record against Minnesota: 39–7–0

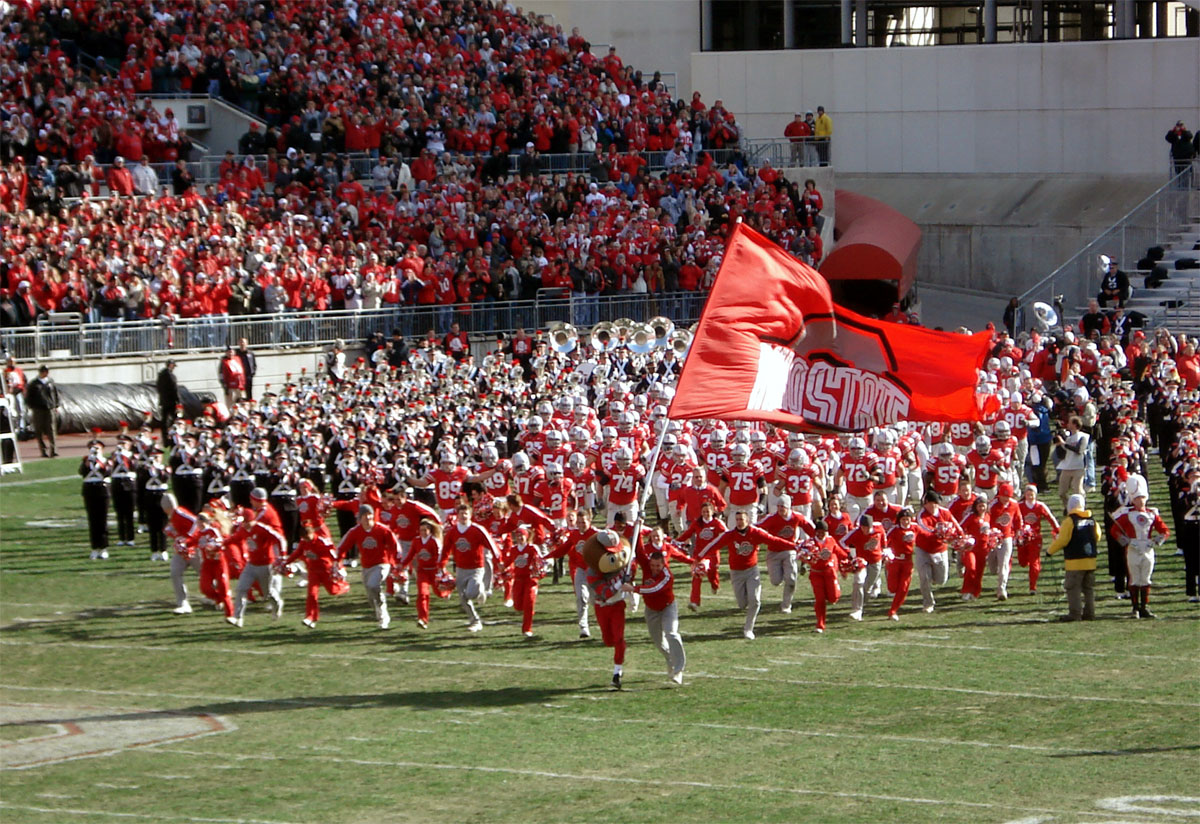
The Buckeyes take the field against Minnesota on 2006-10-28.

The Buckeyes crushed the Minnesota Golden Gophers in Ohio Stadium, 44–0. Ohio State used both a dominating offense and a crushing defense to control the game, played under cool and windy conditions. The shutout was Ohio State's first since September 27, 2003. The shutout was preserved with two defensive stops on 4th down and short yardage, the second on a 4th-and-inches at the Ohio State 15 late in the game. Ohio State's domination was such that it did not punt at all during the game.

The Buckeyes dominated Minnesota in all statistics, outgaining them 484 to 182, out-rushing by 266 to 47, and out-passing them 218 yards to 135. Ohio State racked up 29 first downs to Minnesota's 10, and had a 5:22 edge in time of possession. Ohio State turned the ball over on fumbles three times, including two plays in a row in the 2nd quarter, but intercepted Minnesota 3 times (by Antonio Smith, Jamario O’Neal, and Malcolm Jenkins). The Buckeyes’ 18 total interceptions for the season leads all Division I-A teams.

Antonio Pittman scored two of Ohio State's 5 rushing touchdowns, carried the ball for 116 yards, and had two pass receptions for 47 yards. Chris Wells carried the ball for another 90 yards and scored once. Troy Smith threw for 183 yards and a touchdown on 14–21 passing, and scored a rushing touchdown on a long scramble. Justin Zwick added the other rushing score on a 4th quarter sneak. The sole touchdown catch was 18 yards to Brian Robiskie, his only catch of the day. Brian Hartline had four catches for 69 yards to lead all players.

=== Ohio State 17, Illinois 10 ===
	1	2	3	4	Total
Ohio State	7	10	0	0	17
Illinois	0	0	0	10	10

All-time record against Illinois: 60–29–4

In its poorest offensive performance of the season, Ohio State struggled against 2–7 Illinois but escaped with a 17–10 win. Illinois drove 80 yards in the last five minutes of the game to close the margin to a touchdown, but Ohio State recovered the onside kick and managed to hold the ball until only 4 seconds were left in the game. Their punt pinned Illinois at the Illini three and the game ended on the next play.

Ohio State began strong, driving the ball 80 yards on its opening series for a Chris Wells touchdown. After Curtis Terry recovered an Illinois fumble, Ohio State then drove 38 yards for its second touchdown, a short rush by Antonio Pittman. However midway through the 2nd quarter Wells fumbled in the open field without contact, and the Buckeyes' offensive momentum slowed. They scored on a 50-yard field goal by Aaron Pettrey just before halftime but did not have another effective offensive series after that.

In the second half, the Buckeyes had three straight series of losses and were consistently out-muscled by an inspired and athletic Illinois defense the entire half, gaining just 27 yards. Troy Smith threw an interception with 5 minutes to play, but on the next play James Laurinaitis countered with an interception of his own. Even so, Illinois forced a punt and drove for its only touchdown. Ohio State played well on defense until the final five minutes of the game, holding Illinois to 137 yards before their touchdown drive, but in the end the Illini outgained Ohio State 233 yards to 224, although having possession nearly twelve minutes less.

=== Ohio State 54, Northwestern 10 ===
	1	2	3	4	Total
Ohio State	21	12	14	7	54
Northwestern	0	10	0	0	10

All-time record against Northwestern: 57–14–1

Troy Smith tied a career-high with four touchdown passes and the Buckeye defense forced five turnovers—each of which resulted in a touchdown—as the Buckeyes steamrolled overmatched Northwestern, 54–10. Smith had 185 yards passing. Freshman receiver Brian Hartline caught two of Smith's touchdown passes; the other two went to Anthony Gonzalez and Ted Ginn Jr. Halfback Antonio Pittman had 80 yards on the ground. Pittman eclipsed the 1,000-yard mark for the second straight season, becoming the first Buckeye tailback since Eddie George (1994–1995) to accomplish that feat. Beanie Wells added a career-high 99 yards. Both Pittman and Wells had a touchdown run. The Buckeyes outgained the Wildcats 425–297. The OSU defense tallied two interceptions, bringing the season total to 21. Senior safety Brandon Mitchell returned his INT 46 yards for his second career touchdown (his first came on an interception last year at Indiana). 54 points is the most that Ohio State has scored since defeating Pitt 72–0 in 1996. The Buckeye rout, coupled with Michigan's 34–3 defeat of Indiana, set the stage for the first No. 1 vs. No. 2 matchup in the rivalry's storied history.

Smith was named co-Player of the Week in the Big Ten on offense, his fifth weekly conference accolade of his career and his fourth in 2006, which tied him with six other players for the most offensive awards in a single year. (The others were Indiana's Anthony Thompson (1989), Michigan's Desmond Howard (1991), Wisconsin's Ron Dayne (1999), Purdue's Drew Brees (2000) and Kyle Orton (2004), and Penn State's Larry Johnson (2002).)

=== Ohio State 42, Michigan 39 ===
All-time record against Michigan: 40–57–6

	1	2	3	4	Total
Michigan	7	7	10	15	39
Ohio State	7	21	7	7	42

On November 18, No. 1 Ohio State defeated No. 2 Michigan, 42–39, at Ohio Stadium. It was the first, and remains the only, time in the history of the Michigan–Ohio State football rivalry that the teams met while ranked No. 1 and No. 2 in the AP poll. It was billed by some as The Game of the Century. The victory gave the Buckeyes their first outright Big Ten championship since 1984.

Michigan drove 80 yards and took an early lead, as they kept the Buckeye defense completely off-balance. Michigan quarterback Chad Henne set up a one-yard run for Mike Hart with an effective passing attack to Mario Manningham. Ohio State tied the score when Troy Smith, playing his final home game for the Buckeyes, threw a one-yard touchdown pass to senior wideout Roy Hall.

In the second quarter, freshman Beanie Wells used a spin move and a hurdle of a tackler to break away for a 52-yard run that put the Buckeyes up 14–7. After a Wolverine punt, Smith threw a 39-yard touchdown pass to Ted Ginn Jr. Henne then led the Wolverines 65 yards in two minutes, ending with a touchdown pass to Adrian Arrington. In the final two minutes of the half, Smith completed his third touchdown pass, finding Anthony Gonzalez for the score.

In the second half, Ohio State gave up the ball on a three-and-out when Smith was ineffective on three passes. Michigan again appeared to take back the momentum with a scoring drive and a field goal following an interception thrown by Smith at the Ohio State 25, but Antonio Pittman found a wide gap in the Michigan defensive line and ran away from the Wolverine secondary for a 56-yard touchdown that gave Ohio State an 11-point lead. With seconds left in the third quarter, a bad snap by injured captain and center Doug Datish in the shotgun formation caused the ball to go over Smith's head for a fumble recovered by Michigan at the Ohio State nine-yard line. Hart scored his third touchdown after the recovery nineteen seconds into the fourth quarter, and the lead was again down to four points.

Later in the fourth quarter, Datish again turned over the ball on a bad snap after Ohio State had driven deep into Michigan territory, but Michigan was forced to punt. Smith threw his fourth touchdown pass of the game, a 13-yard completion to sophomore wide receiver Brian Robiskie in the front corner of the end zone with only 5:38 remaining.

Michigan moved the ball on a long drive, but were stopped at midfield. On fourth down, Henne threw deep downfield for an incomplete pass; however, pass interference was called on safety Jamario O'Neal, and the Wolverines were still alive. Henne passed for a 16-yard score and a two-point conversion, providing the final margin. The Wolverines' onside kick attempt was recovered by Ted Ginn Jr. on the fly. With Michigan out of timeouts, Ohio State was able to run out the clock.

The victory was Smith's third over Michigan, making him the first Ohio State quarterback to win three consecutive games over Michigan since Tippy Dye (who attended the 2006 game) from 1934 to1936 . Smith completed 29 of 41 passes for 316 yards and four touchdowns, hitting eight different receivers, and was sacked only once. Ginn caught eight passes for 104 yards, Robiskie seven for 89 yards, Gonzalez four for 50 yards, and Hall three for 38 yards, all four scoring touchdowns. Against Michigan's top-rated rushing defense, Pittman carried the ball 18 times for 139 yards and Wells five times for 56. Overall, Ohio State tallied 503 total yards (187 on the ground) against Michigan's highly-rated defense. The 42 points scored by Ohio State is the most it has scored against Michigan since 1968, when Woody Hayes' "Super Sophomores" (Rex Kern, John Brockington, Jack Tatum, Jim Stillwagon, et al.) scored 50 points.

On defense, the Buckeyes gave up 39 points, more than Ohio State's prior six opponents who had been held to a combined total of 37 points. Although giving up points far in excess of its season average, and being hard-pressed at times, the Buckeye defense sacked Henne four times, held Michigan to four conversions on thirteen third down attempts, and forced five punts and a turnover on downs.

Troy Smith received his fifth Big Ten Offensive Player of the Week award for the 2006 season, setting a new conference record for most received in a single season. This honor was the sixth of his career.

=== BCS National Championship Game – Florida 41, Ohio State 14 ===
	1	2	3	4	Total
Florida	14	20	0	7	41
Ohio State	7	7	0	0	14

On January 8, 2007, Ohio State lost to Florida, 41–14, in the BCS National Championship game in Glendale, Arizona. It was the first meeting between the schools in football.

Ohio State scored on the opening play of the game with a kickoff return by Ted Ginn Jr., but it was the last play of Ginn's college career, as he left the game with a foot injury sustained during his touchdown celebration. Under relentless pressure from the Gators' defensive line, quarterback Troy Smith posted the worst game of his career being sacked five times and completing only four of 14 passes for 35 yards with an interception, a fumble, and −29 yards on sacks.

== Personnel ==
=== Roster ===
(as of August 22, 2006)
Quarterbacks: 7 Antonio Henton – Freshman; 10 Troy Smith – (redshirt) Senior; 12 Justin Zwick – (redshirt) Senior; 13 Ben Kacsandi – (redshirt) Sophomore; 16 Rob Shoenhoft – (redshirt) Freshman; 17 Todd Boeckman – (redshirt) Sophomore; Running backs: 16 Trever Robinson – (redshirt) Junior; 25 Antonio Pittman – Junior; 28 Chris Wells – Freshman; 33 Joe Gantz – (redshirt) Freshman; 34 Maurice Wells – Sophomore; Fullbacks: 35 Ryan Franzinger – Senior; 43 Aram Olson – Freshman; 49 Dionte Johnson – Junior; 89 Stan White Jr. – (redshirt) Senior; Wide receivers: 4 Ray Small – Freshman; 5 Albert Dukes – (redshirt) Sophomore; 7 Ted Ginn Jr. – Junior; 8 Roy Hall – (redshirt) Senior; 9 Brian Hartline – (redshirt) Freshman; 11 Anthony Gonzalez – (redshirt) Junior; 15 Kyle Ruhl – (redshirt) Sophomore; 18 Devon Lyons – (redshirt) Sophomore; 18 David Lisko – (redshirt) Sophomore; 19 Derek Harden – Senior; 80 Brian Robiskie – Sophomore; 81 Brent Ullery – (redshirt) Junior; 86 Dan Potokar – (redshirt) Freshman; Tight ends: 46 John Larson – (redshirt) Freshman; 82 Andy Miller – Freshman; 83 Will Crall – (redshirt) Freshman; 86 Jake Ballard – Freshman; 87 Brandon Smith – (redshirt) Sophomore; 88 Rory Nicol – (redshirt) Sophomore	Offensive line: 50 Doug Datish – (redshirt) Senior; 54 Tyler Whaley – (redshirt) Sophomore; 59 David Yurkovich -; Senior: 63 Ben Person – (redshirt) Sophomore; 64 Jim Cordle – (redshirt) Freshman; 65 Doug Ebner – (redshirt) Sophomore; 66 Andrew Moses – (redshirt) Freshman; 67 Kyle Mitchum – (redshirt) Sophomore; 68 Tim Schafer – (redshirt) Senior; 70 Bryant Browning – Freshman; 71 Steve Rehring – (redshirt) Sophomore; 72 T.J. Downing – (redshirt) Senior; 73 Josh Kerr – Freshman; 74 Kirk Barton – (redshirt) Junior; 75 Alex Boone – Sophomore; 77 Connor Smith – Freshman; 78 Daniel Dye – (redshirt) Junior; 79 Jon Skinner – (redshirt) Sophomore; 80 Alex Smyczek – (redshirt) Sophomore; Defensive line: 9 Robert Rose – Freshman; 50 Vernon Gholston – (redshirt) Sophomore; 69 Bryan Gray – (redshirt) Freshman; 72 Dexter Larimore – Freshman; 78 Alex Barrow – (redshirt) Sophomore; 84 Doug Worthington – (redshirt) Freshman; 87 Lawrence Wilson – Sophomore; 90 Quinn Pitcock – (redshirt) Senior; 91 Ryan Williams – (redshirt) Freshman; 92 Brett Daly – (redshirt) Junior; 92 Todd Denlinger – (redshirt) Freshman; 93 Nader Abdallah – (redshirt) Sophomore; 94 Walter Dublin – Freshman; 96 Juan Garnier – (redshirt) Junior; 97 David Patterson – Senior; 98 Joel Penton – (redshirt) Senior; 99 Jay Richardson – (redshirt) Senior	Linebackers: 1 Marcus Freeman – (redshirt) Sophomore; ~~5 Mike D'Andrea – (redshirt) Senior~~ (out for season with knee injury); 6 Larry Grant – Junior; 26 Tyler Moeller – Freshman; 33 James Laurinaitis – Sophomore; 36 Curt Lukens – (redshirt) Junior; 37 Thaddeus Gibson – Freshman; 38 Austin Spitler – (redshirt) Freshman; 42 Nathan Schwartz – Freshman; 44 Mark Johnson – Freshman; 49 Ryan Lukens – (redshirt) Sophomore; 51 Ross Homan – Freshman; 52 John Kerr – (redshirt) Senior; 55 Curtis Terry – Junior; Defensive backs: 2 Malcolm Jenkins – Sophomore; 3 Jamario O'Neal – Sophomore; 4 Kurt Coleman – Freshman; 5 Chimdi Chekwa – Freshman; 8 Aaron Gant – Freshman; 13 Andre Amos – (redshirt) Freshman; 14 Antonio Smith – (redshirt) Senior; 17 Alex Smyczek – (redshirt) Sophomore; 20 Donald Washington – (redshirt) Freshman; 21 Anderson Russell – (redshirt) Freshman; 23 Nick Patterson – (redshirt) Sophomore; 24 Grant Schwartz – Freshman; 29 Shaun Lane – (redshirt) Sophomore; 32 Brandon Mitchell – (redshirt) Senior; 34 Marcus Williams – Freshman; 36 Matt Daniels – (redshirt) Sophomore; 39 Michael Dougherty – (redshirt) Sophomore; 38 Doug Peterson – (redshirt) Junior	Punters: 15 A.J. Trapasso – (redshirt) Sophomore; 24 Tyson Gentry – (redshirt) Sophomore; 44 Jason Weihrauch – Freshman; 48 Jon Thoma – (redshirt) Freshman; Kickers: 20 Aaron Pettrey – (redshirt) Freshman; 39 Andrew Good – Junior; 41 Michael Mattimoe – (redshirt) Freshman; 85 Ryan Pretorius – (redshirt) Sophomore; Long snappers: 56 Dimitrios Makridis – (redshirt) Junior; 58 Drew Norman – (redshirt) Senior; 61 Matt Drummelsmith – (redshirt) Sophomore; 62 Harrison Till – (redshirt) Senior; Underscoring indicates first on depth chart

=== Coaching staff ===
- Jim Tressel – head coach (6th year)
- Tim Beckman – cornerbacks (2nd year)
- Jim Bollman – offensive line/offensive coordinator (6th year)
- Joe Daniels – quarterbacks / passing game coordinator (6th year)
- Luke Fickell – co-defensive coordinator / linebackers (5th year)
- Paul Haynes - safeties (2nd year)
- Darrell Hazell – assistant head coach / wide receivers (3rd year)
- Jim Heacock – defensive coordinator / defensive line (11th year)
- John Peterson – tight ends / recruiting coordinator (3rd year)
- Dick Tressel – running backs (6th year)
- Bob Tucker – director of football operations (12th year)
- Stan Jefferson – director of player development (3rd year)
- Eric Lichter – director of football performance (1st year)
- Butch Reynolds – speed coordinator (2nd year)

=== Depth chart ===
Defense

FS
Anderson Russell
Jamario O'Neal

WLB	MLB	SLB
⋅	James Laurinaitis	⋅
Ross Homan	Larry Grant	⋅

SS
Brandon Mitchell
Nick Patterson

CB
Antonio Smith
Donald Washington

DE	DT	DT	DE
Jay Richardson	Quinn Pitcock	David Patterson	Vernon Gholston
Lawrence Wilson	Todd Denlinger	Joel Penton	Alex Barrow

CB
Malcolm Jenkins
Andre Amos

Offense

SE
Anthony Gonzalez
Brian Hartline & Brian Robiskie

LT	LG	C	RG	RT
Alex Boone	Steve Rehring	Doug Datish	T.J. Downing	Kirk Barton
Tim Shafer	Kyle Mitchum	Tyler Whaley	Ben Person	⋅

TE
Rory Nicol
Jake Ballard

FL
Ted Ginn Jr.
Ray Small

QB
Troy Smith
Justin Zwick

Key reserves
WR Albert Dukes
WR Roy Hall
C Jim Cordle

FB
Stan White
Dionte Johnson

Special teams
PK Aaron Pettrey
P A. J. Trapasso
KR Ted Ginn Jr.
PR Ted Ginn Jr.

RB
Antonio Pittman
Chris Wells

Source: Athletic Department official site, 2006 football archive 12-10-06 depth chart

== Awards ==
=== National award winners ===
- Troy Smith was awarded the Heisman Trophy for best college football player of the year. He was also named the Associated Press Player of the Year, was awarded the Walter Camp Award as the best college football player and the Davey O'Brien Award as the top college quarterback.
- James Laurinaitis received the Bronko Nagurski Trophy as best defensive player.
- Troy Smith, Quinn Pitcock, and James Laurinaitis were named to the first team of both the Associated Press and Walter Camp All-Americans, and Ted Ginn Jr. was named to the second team.
- Joel Penton was awarded the Wuerffel Trophy.

=== Conference honors ===
Troy Smith was awarded Chicago Tribune Silver Football as the best player in the Big Ten Conference. Ten Ohio State player received first-team honors from the coaches or media on the 2006 All-Big Ten Conference football team:

- Quarterback Troy Smith (Coaches-1, Media-1)
- Running back Antonio Pittman (Coaches-1, Media-2)
- Receiver Ted Ginn Jr. (Coaches-2, Media-1)
- Receiver Anthony Gonzalez (Coaches-1)
- Center Doug Datish (Coaches-1, Media-1)
- Guard T. J. Downing (Coaches-1, Media-1)
- Defensive tackle Quinn Pitcock (Coaches-1, Media-1)
- Linebacker James Laurinitis (Coaches-1, Media-1)
- Defensive back Malcolm Jenkins (Coaches-1, Media-1)
- Defensive back Antonio Smith (Coaches-1, Media-1)

=== Team awards ===
- Troy Smith – Most valuable player
- Antonio Smith – Bo Rein Award (most inspirational player)
- Stan White Jr. – John W. Galbreath Award (excellence in academics)
- Quinn Pitcock – Bill Willis Award (most outstanding defensive player)
- David Patterson – Jim Marshall Warrior Award
- Ted Ginn Jr. – Archie Griffin Award (most outstanding offensive player)
- Chris Wells – Most outstanding freshman offensive player
- Donald Washington – Most outstanding freshman defensive player
- Antonio Pittman – Rex Kern Offensive Back Award
- James Laurinaitis – Randy Gradishar Linebacker Award
- Drew Norman – Ike Kelley Special Teams Award
- Brandon Mitchell – Arnie Chonko Defensive Back Award
- Jay Richardson – Jack Stephenson Defensive Lineman Award
- Anthony Gonzalez – Paul Warfield Outstanding Receiver Award
- Doug Datish – Jim Parker Offensive Lineman Award (shared)
- T. J. Downing – Jim Parker Offensive Lineman Award (shared)
- Malcolm Jenkins – SAE Homecoming Award
- Antonio Smith – Agonis Club Award

== 2007 NFL draftees ==
Player	Round	Pick	Position	NFL club
Ted Ginn Jr.	1	9	Wide receiver	Miami Dolphins
Anthony Gonzalez	1	32	Wide receiver	Indianapolis Colts
Quinn Pitcock	3	98	Defensive tackle	Indianapolis Colts
Antonio Pittman	4	107	Running back	New Orleans Saints
Jay Richardson	5	138	Defensive end	Oakland Raiders
Roy Hall	5	169	Wide receiver	Indianapolis Colts
Troy Smith	5	174	Quarterback	Baltimore Ravens
Doug Datish	6	198	Center	Atlanta Falcons
