= 2006 Michigan vs. Ohio State football game =

2006 Michigan vs. Ohio State
- Conference game "Game of the Century"
Michigan Wolverines	Ohio State Buckeyes
(11–0)	(11–0)
39	42
Head coach: Lloyd Carr	Head coach: Jim Tressel
AP / Coaches / BCS; 2 / 2 / 2	AP / Coaches / BCS; 1 / 1 / 1
	1	2	3	4	Total
Michigan	7	7	10	15	39
Ohio State	7	21	7	7	42
- Date: November 18, 2006
- Season: 2006
- Stadium: Ohio Stadium
- Location: Columbus, Ohio
- Favorite: Ohio State by 6
- Referee: Bill LeMonnier
- Halftime show: The Ohio State University Marching Band
- Attendance: 105,708

United States TV coverage
- Network: ABC
- Announcers: Brent Musburger (play-by-play); Kirk Herbstreit (color); Bob Davie (color); Bonnie Bernstein (sideline); Lisa Salters (sideline)
- Nielsen ratings: 13.0

The 2006 Michigan vs. Ohio State game was a regular-season college football game between the unbeaten Michigan Wolverines (ranked No. 2 in the nation) and the unbeaten Ohio State Buckeyes (ranked No. 1 in the nation) on November 18, 2006, at Ohio Stadium in Columbus, Ohio. Called the "Game of the Century," this was the first time in the rivalry series that the teams entered the matchup ranked No. 1 and No. 2 in the nation. In a game featuring lots of offense, Ohio State won 42–39.

Michigan and Ohio State first faced each other in 1897 and have met annually since 1918. (Note: The exception to this streak was in 2020, when the game was canceled due to the COVID-19 pandemic.) Considered by some the greatest rivalry in American sports, the rivalry had to that point been the de facto Big Ten Conference championship game on 22 occasions, with the game affecting the determination of the championship an additional 27 times (the Big Ten did not have a conference championship game until 2011). Ohio State entered the 2006 season ranked No. 1, while Michigan was ranked No. 14 in the AP preseason poll. With both teams winning all of their regular season games prior to their matchup, Ohio State remained No. 1 in all major polls, while Michigan moved up to No. 2 in the polls.

Both Michigan and Ohio State scored on their first offensive possessions, while the Buckeyes would eventually go up 21–7 midway through the second quarter. The Buckeyes took a 28–14 lead into halftime, with the Wolverines closing the gap in the third quarter, scoring on a Mike Hart touchdown run and a Garrett Rivas field goal. Ohio State would extend their lead again following an Antonio Pittman touchdown run, though Michigan would bring the game within four points on another Hart touchdown run. A Troy Smith pass to Brian Robiskie would extend the Buckeyes' lead to 42–31. A late touchdown and two-point conversion would not be enough for Michigan, as the Buckeyes' would go on to win the game 42–39.

Following the game, Ohio State claimed the Big Ten championship outright, for the first time since 1984, and a berth in the BCS National Championship Game, while the Wolverines would accept a berth in the Rose Bowl. Smith became the seventh Ohio State player to win the Heisman Trophy, while multiple players on both teams were recognized with conference and national awards. Michigan was defeated 32–18 by the USC Trojans in the Rose Bowl, while Ohio State was defeated 41–14 by the Florida Gators in the national championship game.

== Pre-game buildup ==
Michigan and Ohio State first faced each other in 1897, and have met annually since 1918. Coming into the game, Michigan held the all-time lead in the series 57–39–6, though Ohio State had won the previous two meetings. Called simply "The Game" by some, the rivalry is considered one of the greatest in American sports. The rivalry was specifically intense during a period known as the Ten Year War from 1969 to 1978 when Woody Hayes of Ohio State and Bo Schembechler of Michigan coached opposing teams. Schembechler died at the age of 77 on the eve of the game. This would be the first time since 1973 that both teams came into the rivalry game undefeated.

At the beginning of the season, both teams were ranked in the top fifteen. Following a victory over the then-second-ranked Texas on September 9, the Buckeyes' top rank was cemented. Michigan's victory over the then-second-ranked Notre Dame the following week on September 16, would bring them into the top ten at No. 6 in the AP poll. Both teams would go on to win their remaining games and enter the rivalry with Michigan, ranked No. 2 in the BCS standings, while Ohio State was ranked No. 1. This would be the first time in the BCS-era that the top-two-ranked teams would play each other in the regular season. Due to the No. 1 vs. No. 2 rankings from the conference rivals and the hype that led up to the matchup, the game was referred to as the "Game of the Century."

=== Michigan ===
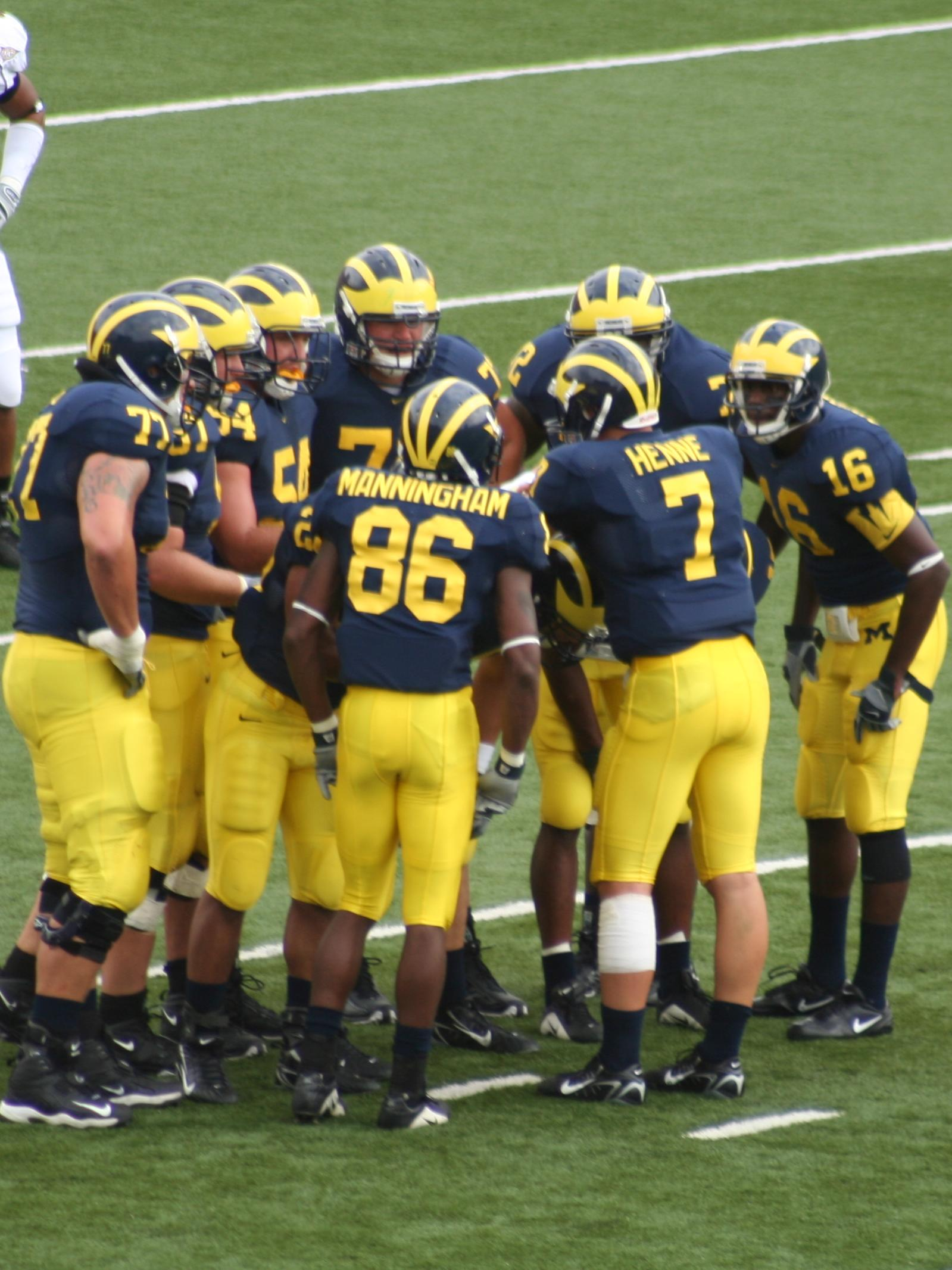
The Wolverines' offense in the huddle.

In the preseason polls, Michigan opened the 2006 season ranked No. 14 in the AP Poll, while being ranked No. 15 in the Coaches' Poll. The Wolverines' opened the season against the Vanderbilt Commodores and defeated them 27–7. Following a 41–17 victory over Central Michigan, the No. 11 Wolverines traveled to Notre Dame Stadium to play the No. 2 Fighting Irish. Following a dominating performance on offense and defense, which included three interceptions of Irish quarterback Brady Quinn, the Wolverines defeated Notre Dame 47–21 and moved to No. 6 in the polls the following week. Michigan opened their conference schedule defeating the Wisconsin Badgers 27–13, and the Minnesota Golden Gophers in the Little Brown Jug game.

Michigan remained consistent at No. 6 in the polls and defeated their in-state rival Michigan State 31–13, holding the Spartans to just 60 rushing yards, while they themselves ran the ball for 211 yards. Following the victory, Michigan moved up to No. 4 in the AP Poll and No. 5 in the Coaches' Poll. The Wolverines then traveled to Beaver Stadium and defeated Penn State 17–10, moving up to No. 2 in the AP Poll and No. 3 in the Coaches'. After a 20–6 victory over Iowa and a 17–3 victory over Northwestern, the Wolverines moved to No. 2 in all major polls. Although a closer game than expected, Michigan finished off their non-conference schedule with a 34–26 victory over Ball State. Michigan's 34–3 win over Indiana would bring them to 11–0 on the season and keep them ranked No. 2 in all major polls. On November 17, former Michigan coach Bo Schembechler collapsed and was taken to the hospital, where he was later pronounced dead. Schembechler's death happened just one day before one of the biggest games in the rivalry, though he had not planned on attending the game.

Coming into the game with Ohio State, the Wolverines ranked twelfth in the nation in rushing offense, led by Mike Hart who had 1,373 yards and 11 touchdowns. Michigan quarterback Chad Henne compiled 1,932 passing yards, 18 touchdowns and seven interceptions, with Mario Manningham, Steve Breaston and Adrian Arrington leading the team in receptions. The Michigan defense ranked third in the nation, allowing only 231.4 yard per game, while also having the best rush defense, holding opponents to only 29.9 rushing yards per game and giving up only three rushing touchdowns.

=== Ohio State ===
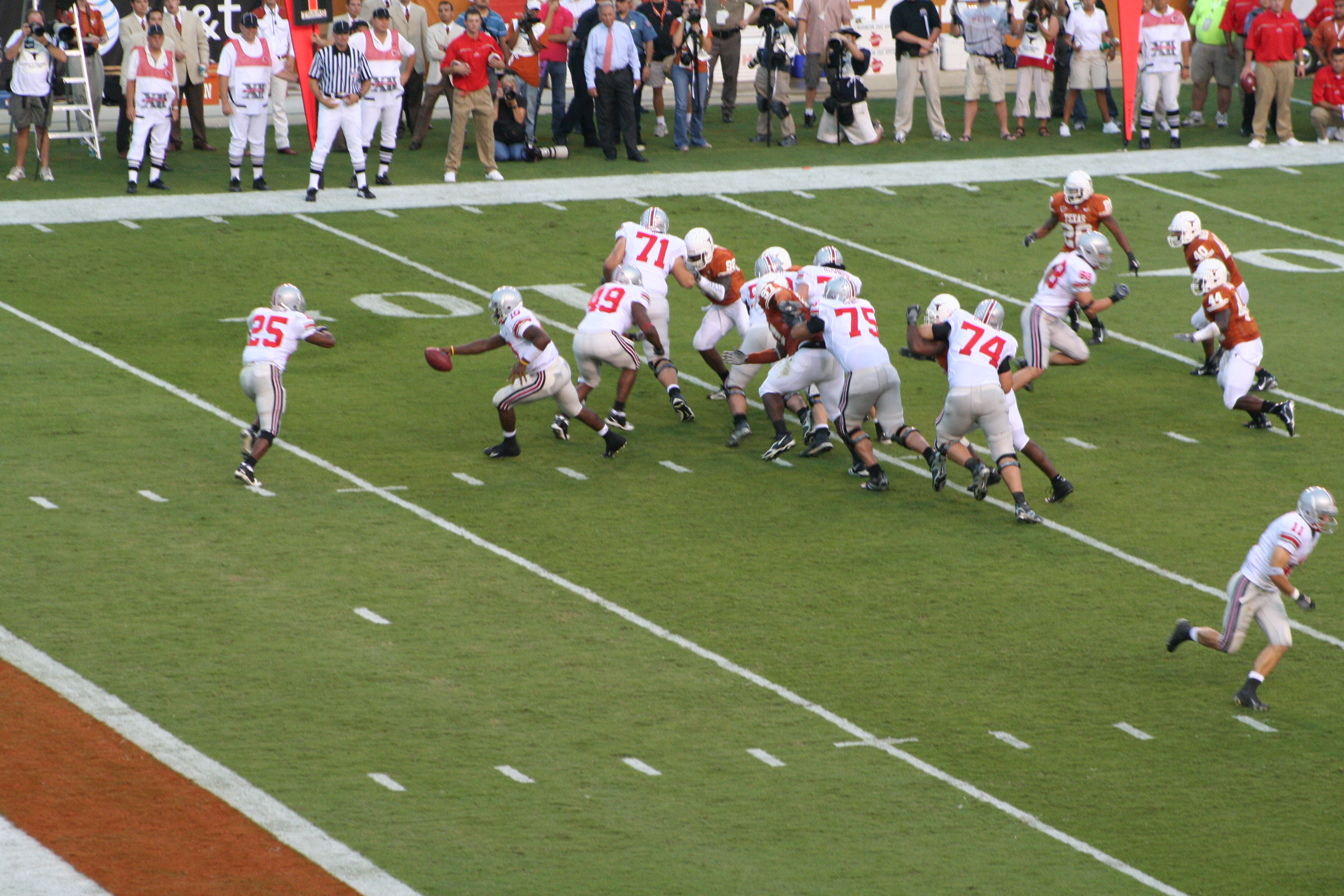
The Buckeyes' offense against Texas.

In the preseason polls, Ohio State opened the 2006 season as the No. 1 ranked team in both the AP and Coaches' Poll. The Buckeyes' opened their season by defeating the Northern Illinois Huskies 35–12. Ohio State traveled to Darrell K Royal–Texas Memorial Stadium to play the second game of a home-and-home series with Texas, following a 25–22 defeat in Columbus, Ohio in 2005. Ohio State defeated the then-second-ranked Longhorns 24–7, remaining the No. 1 team in all major college football polls. Ohio State defeated the Cincinnati Bearcats 37–7 the following week, with Troy Smith throwing for 203 yards and two touchdowns.

Ohio State faced the No. 24 Penn State Nittany Lions in Columbus and defeated them 28–6 after scoring three touchdowns in the fourth quarter. The Buckeyes defeated the No. 13 Iowa Hawkeyes the following week 38–17 in Kinnick Stadium. Ohio State finished their non-conference schedule defeating Bowling Green 35–7 and then defeated Michigan State the next week in Spartan Stadium 38–7, with the Buckeyes defense controlling much of the game. Blowout victories over Indiana and Minnesota would be followed by a 17–10 victory over Illinois for the Illibuck trophy. A 54–10 victory over Northwestern the following week gave the Buckeyes an 11–0 record heading into the rivalry game, with their ranking remaining consistent at No. 1 in all major polls.

Quarterback Troy Smith entered the game against Michigan with 2,191 passing yards and 26 touchdown passes, while also leading the Heisman Trophy debate. Ted Ginn Jr. and Anthony Gonzalez led the Buckeyes in receiving yards with 677 and 673 yards, respectively. The Buckeyes rush defense had given up only 90.2 yards per games and three touchdowns, while they were tied for first in the nation with 21 interceptions. James Laurinaitis and Malcolm Jenkins led the team with five and four respectively.

== Game summary ==
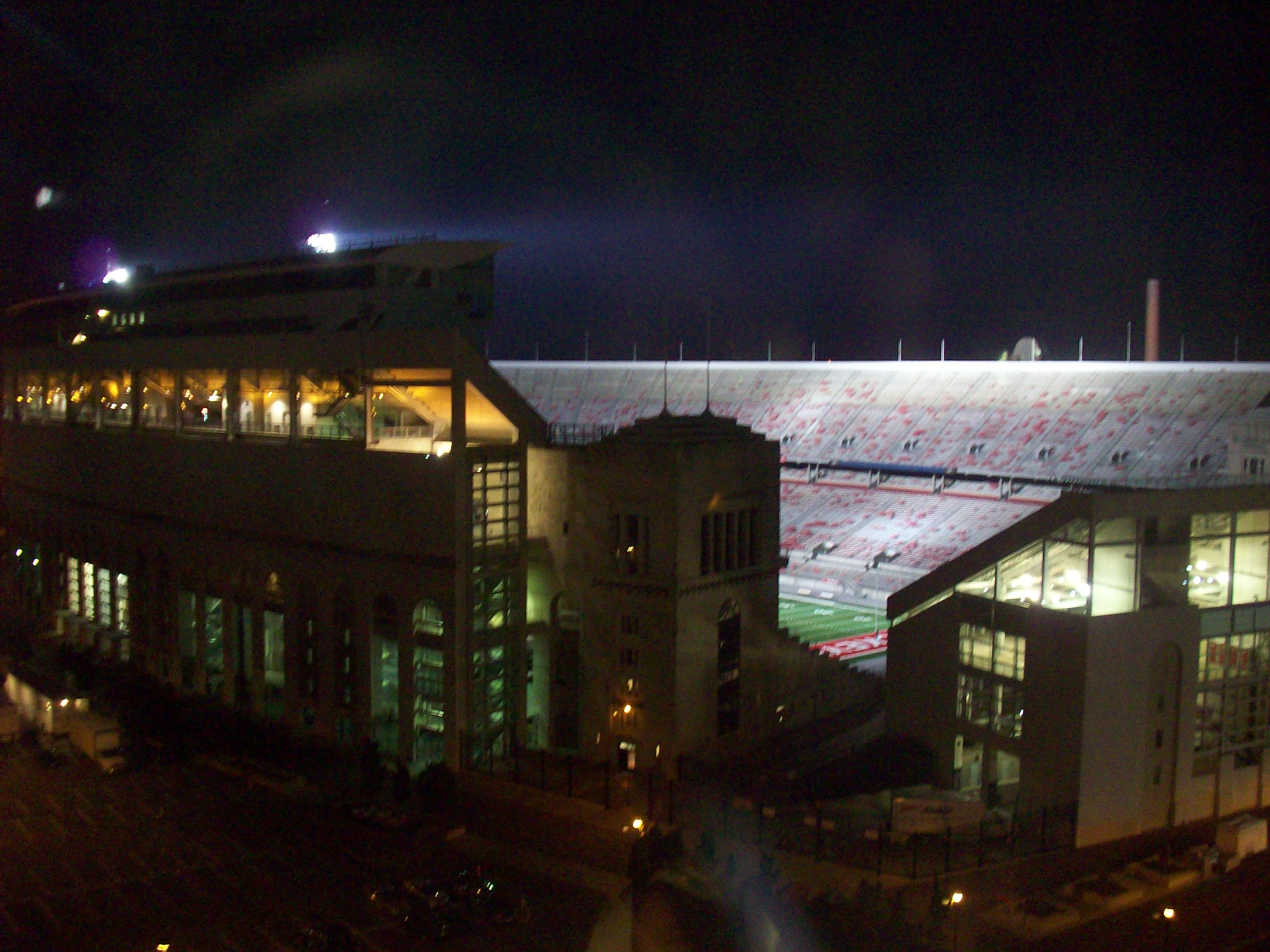
This was the first edition of "The Game" to be played under the lights at Ohio Stadium.

Traditionally, the rivalry game between Michigan and Ohio State kicked off at noon on ABC. However, due to the circumstances of the matchup, ESPN and ABC moved the kickoff time to 3:30 p.m. EST, making it one of the only times the rivalry game had been played under the floodlights.

The 2006 edition of "The Game" kicked off at 3:44 p.m. EST on November 18, 2006, in front of a crowd of 105,708 at Ohio Stadium in Columbus, Ohio. The game received extensive media coverage from ABC and ESPN, including in the preceding week and from a visit from ESPN College GameDay the morning of the game. The game itself drew a 13.0 rating, with an estimated 21.8 million viewership on ABC, making it the most watched regular-season college football game since the 1993 game between Florida State and Notre Dame.

=== First quarter ===
Ohio State won the coin toss and elected to defer, giving Michigan the ball to start the first half. The opening kickoff by Aaron Pettrey was taken for a touchback by Michigan, with the Wolverines starting their first possession at their own 20 yard line. Mike Hart received the ball on the first play from scrimmage, rushing for three yards. Three straight completions from quarterback Chad Henne drove them into Ohio State territory. A nine-yard run from Hart, followed by a 25-yard pass from Henne to Mario Manningham, brought Michigan to the Buckeyes' one yard line. A touchdown run from Hart gave the Wolverines an early 7–0 lead. Quarterback Troy Smith and the Buckeyes responded on their ensuing possession, with Smith passing the ball on the first eight plays of the possession. A touchdown pass from Smith to Roy Hall tied the game at 7–7. After converting a first down on their next possession, the Wolverines were forced to punt. Ohio State was also unable to move the ball on its next possession, punting after seven plays. On the ensuing Michigan possession, the Buckeye defense sacked Henne for a loss of three yards as the first quarter ended.

=== Second quarter ===
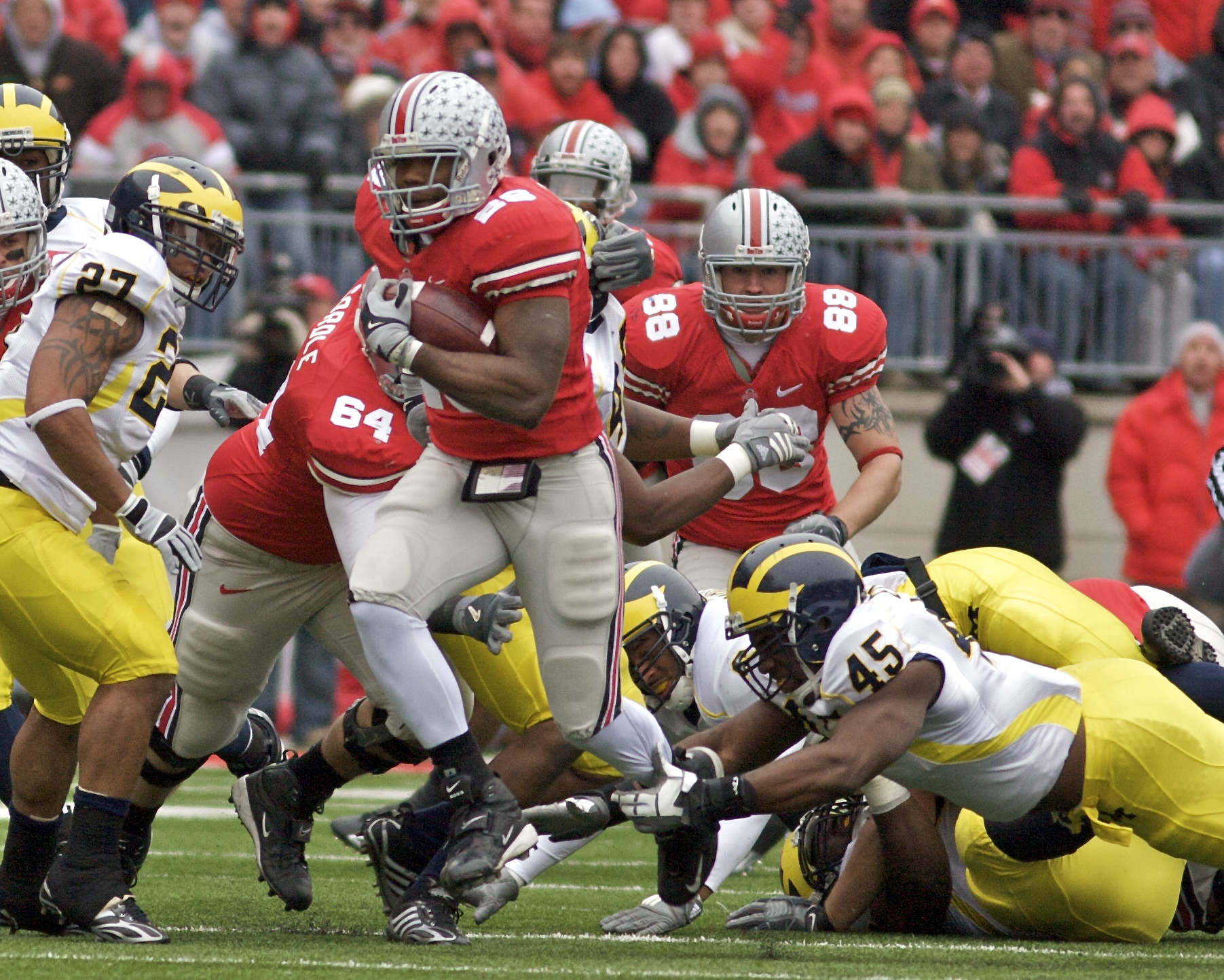
Chris Wells scored on a 52-yard touchdown run, giving the Buckeyes' their first lead of the game.

The second quarter began with Michigan again being unable to move the ball, and being forced to punt after a three and out. The Buckeyes took their first lead of the game two plays later on a 52-yard touchdown run from freshman running back Chris Wells, with the score now 14–7 in favor of Ohio State. A personal foul penalty committed by the Buckeyes extended the ensuing Wolverines drive, though they would punt three plays later. Starting from their own 9, Ohio State drove 91-yards in four plays, scoring on a 39-yard touchdown pass from Smith to receiver Ted Ginn Jr., extending the Buckeye lead to 21–7. Following three straight runs by Mike Hart, the Buckeye defense again gave the Wolverines a first down on a pass interference penalty. Michigan took advantage of the penalty scoring two plays later on a 37-yard touchdown pass from Henne to Adrian Arrington, cutting the Ohio State lead to 21–14. Ohio State started their next drive with seven consecutive pass attempts, driving 72 yards to the Michigan 8. A touchdown pass from Smith to Anthony Gonzalez gave Ohio State a 28–14 lead. Time expired on the ensuing kickoff, giving Ohio State the two touchdown advantage going into halftime.

=== Third quarter ===
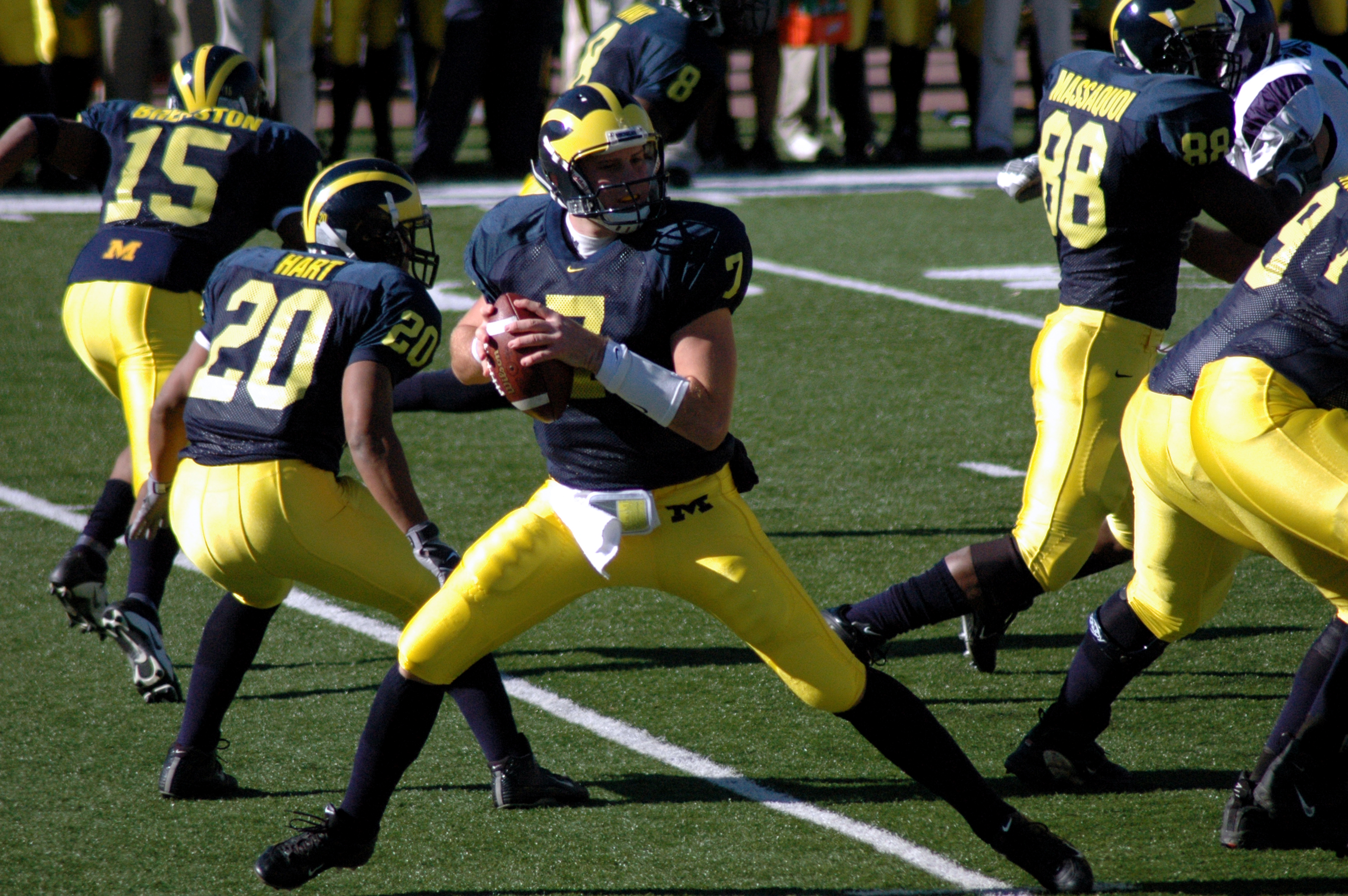
Chad Henne (7) and Mike Hart (20) accounted for all five Wolverine touchdowns.

Ohio State received the ball to start the second half, with the Wolverine defense forcing their first three and out of the game. Three runs for 58 yards by Mike Hart set up Michigan at the Ohio State 2. Hart scored his second touchdown of the day on a two-yard run, cutting the Buckeye lead again to one possession at 28–21. Three plays later, on Ohio State's next possession, Troy Smith threw an interception to Alan Branch, giving Michigan possession of the ball at the Buckeye 25 yard line. Michigan was unable to convert a first down off of the interception, settling instead for a 39-yard field goal from Garrett Rivas, cutting the Ohio State lead to 28–24. Ohio State responded three plays later on a 56-yard touchdown from Antonio Pittman, giving the Buckeyes a 35–24 lead. After driving to the Ohio State 34, Michigan was unable to convert on a fourth down, turning it over to Ohio State. Three and outs by both teams on their ensuing possessions, gave the ball back to Ohio State with over a minute remaining in the quarter. A fumble by Smith again gave the ball back to the Wolverines, this time at the Ohio State 9. A rush from no gain from Hart was the last play of the third quarter.

=== Fourth quarter ===
On the second play of the fourth quarter, Michigan scored on a third touchdown from Mike Hart, cutting the Buckeye lead again to one possession at 35–31. Troy Smith turned the ball over for a third time on the ensuing Buckeye possession, this time on a fumble that was recovered by the Wolverines at the Michigan 32. After a three and out, Michigan was forced to punt, pinning Ohio State back at their own 17. An 11 play, 83-yard drive by the Buckeyes took them to the Michigan 13, where they scored on a touchdown pass from Smith to Brian Robiskie, giving the Buckeyes a 42–31 lead. Michigan's next possession began with five straight completions from Henne. After driving to the Ohio State 16, the Wolverines scored on a touchdown pass from Henne to Tyler Ecker. The Wolverines completed a two-point conversion on a pass from Henne to Steve Breaston, making it a three-point game at 42–39 in favor of Ohio State. The ensuing onside kick by the Wolverines was recovered by Ginn of the Buckeyes. Time expired in the game, following three straight runs from Pittman, giving Ohio State the 42–39 victory.

=== Scoring summary ===
Scoring summary

Quarter	Time	Drive			Team	Scoring information	Score	
Quarter	Time	Plays	Yards	TOP	Team	Scoring information	Michigan	Ohio State
1	12:32	7	80	2:28	Michigan	Mike Hart 1-yard touchdown run, Garrett Rivas kick good	7	0
1	6:03	14	69	6:20	Ohio State	Roy Hall 1-yard touchdown reception from Troy Smith, Aaron Pettrey kick good	7	7
2	12:29	2	58	0:57	Ohio State	Chris Wells 52-yard touchdown run, Aaron Pettrey kick good	7	14
2	6:11	4	91	1:44	Ohio State	Ted Ginn Jr. 39-yard touchdown reception from Troy Smith, Aaron Pettrey kick good	7	21
2	2:33	6	80	3:28	Michigan	Adrian Arrington 37-yard touchdown reception from Chad Henne, Garrett Rivas kick good	14	21
2	0:28	9	80	2:08	Ohio State	Anthony Gonzalez 8-yard touchdown reception from Troy Smith, Aaron Pettrey kick good	14	28
3	12:12	5	60	1:59	Michigan	Mike Hart 2-yard touchdown run, Garrett Rivas kick good	21	28
3	8:41	4	3	2:07	Michigan	39-yard field goal by Garrett Rivas	24	28
3	8:04	2	65	0:21	Ohio State	Antonio Pittman 56-yard touchdown run, Aaron Pettrey kick good	24	35
4	14:41	3	9	0:45	Michigan	Mike Hart 2-yard touchdown run, Garrett Rivas kick good	31	35
4	5:38	11	83	5:00	Ohio State	Brian Robiskie 13-yard touchdown reception from Troy Smith, Aaron Pettrey kick good	31	42
4	2:16	11	81	3:11	Michigan	Tyler Ecker 16-yard touchdown reception from Chad Henne, Steve Breaston reception from Chad Henne	39	42
"TOP" = time of possession. For other American football terms, see Glossary of American football.							39	42

== Statistical summary ==
Statistical Comparison
	Michigan	Ohio State
1st downs	17	24
Total yards	397	503
Passing yards	267	316
Rushing yards	130	187
Penalties	5–45	4–50
3rd down conversions	4–13	6–11
Turnovers	0	3
Time of possession	28:58	31:02

The game was considered an offensive shootout, with both teams combining for 900 yards of total offense, and 81 total points. The Buckeyes' compiled 503 yards of total offense, compared to the Wolverines' 397 yards. Smith completed 29 of 41 passes for 316 passing yards Smith's top receiver in the game was Ginn who had 104 yards on 8 receptions, followed by Robiskie with 89 yards on 7 receptions. Overall, Smith threw four touchdown passes and one interception.

Henne entered the game as the Wolverines' starting quarterback; he completed 21 of 35 passes for 267 passing yards. Manningham was the top receiver for Henne, who had 86 yards on 6 receptions, followed by Arrington who had 90 yards on five receptions. Overall, Henne threw two touchdown passes in the game.

In terms of rushing offense, Ohio State outgained Michigan 187 to 130 yards, led by Pittman who ran for 139 rushing yards on 18 carries. Michigan was led on the ground by Hart, who carried the ball 23 times for 142 yards. Ohio State was led by Pittman's 139 rushing yards, and also saw Wells, a freshman, run for 56 yards, while Manningham rushed for 13 yards on 2 carries for the Wolverines'.

Defensively, David Harris led Michigan with ten total tackles in the game, followed by Terrance Taylor with seven. Branch had one interception and Rondell Biggs accounted for the Wolverines' only quarterback sack of the game. For Ohio State, Laurinaitis led the Buckeyes with nine total tackles in the game, followed by Antonio Smith with eight. Smith, Lawrence Wilson, Joel Penton and Jay Richardson all accounted for the four of Ohio State's quarterback sacks.

== Aftermath ==
=== Potential rematch ===
Both before and after the game, many believed there would be a rematch between Ohio State and Michigan in the BCS National Championship Game, with some suggesting that regardless of the outcome, both teams were still the best two in college football and should therefore be ranked No. 1 and No. 2 as a result. Going into the game, Ohio State was ranked No. 1 in the BCS rankings by just 0.003 points over Michigan, while USC, Florida, and Notre Dame rounded out the top five. Following the game, Ohio State remained No. 1 with a BCS average of 1.000, while Michigan remained in the No. 2 position. Following USC's victory over Notre Dame the following week, the Trojans jumped the Wolverines into the No. 2 position, with Florida in the No. 4 position. In the final week of the regular season, Florida defeated Arkansas in the SEC Championship Game and USC was defeated by UCLA. The final BCS rankings were released on December 3, 2006; Ohio State remained in the No. 1 position and Florida went into the No. 2 position, ensuring there would be no rematch in the championship game. Michigan remained No. 3 in the rankings and trailed Florida by only 0.0101 points.

=== Michigan ===
Following the loss, Michigan finished the regular season with an 11–1 record and ranked No. 3 in all major polls. Since Ohio State earned a bid in the BCS National Championship Game, Michigan received a bid in the Rose Bowl, where they played the No. 5 USC Trojans. At the end of the season, many Michigan players were recognized for their individual accomplishments. Defensive end LaMarr Woodley was unanimously named the Big Ten Defensive Player of the Year, while also being named the Big Ten Defensive Lineman of the Year by the coaches'. Offensive Jake Long received the Big Ten Offensive Lineman of the Year award from the coaches'. Several players also received a unanimous selection to the All-Big Ten First Team, including Woodley, running back Mike Hart, and cornerback Leon Hall. Many players were also named to various All-American Teams, including Woodley, Hall, Long, Hart and defensive end Alan Branch. Woodley also received the Lombardi Award and Ted Hendricks Award. The Wolverines finished the season with a 32–18 loss to USC in Rose Bowl and were ranked No. 8 in the final AP Poll and No. 9 in the final Coaches' poll.

=== Ohio State ===
Following the win, Ohio State finished the regular season undefeated at 12–0, their first undefeated regular season since their 2002 national championship. The Buckeyes' remained No. 1 in all major polls and received and earned a position in the BCS National Championship Game, where they played the No. 2 Florida Gators. At the end of the season, many Ohio State players were recognized for their individual accomplishments, including quarterback Troy Smith who was unanimously named the Big Ten Offensive Player of the Year. Many players were also recognized nationally including Smith, defensive tackle Quinn Pitcock, and linebacker James Laurinaitis, who were named to various national All-American Teams. Smith was awarded the Heisman Trophy (the seventh in school history), the Walter Camp Award, the Davey O'Brien Award, and was named the Associated Press Player of the Year. Laurinaitis also received the Bronko Nagurski Trophy for best defensive player. The Buckeyes' finished the season with a 41–14 loss to Florida in the BCS National Championship Game and were ranked No. 2 in both the final AP and Coaches' poll.
