= 2007 BCS National Championship Game =

College football bowl game

2007 Tostitos BCS National Championship Game
- 9th BCS National Championship Game
Florida Gators	Ohio State Buckeyes
(12–1)	(12–0)
SEC	Big Ten
41	14
Head coach: Urban Meyer	Head coach: Jim Tressel
AP / Coaches / BCS; 2 / 2 / 2	AP / Coaches / BCS; 1 / 1 / 1
	1	2	3	4	Total
Florida	14	20	0	7	41
Ohio State	7	7	0	0	14
- Date: January 8, 2007
- Season: 2006
- Stadium: University of Phoenix Stadium
- Location: Glendale, Arizona
- MVP: Offense: QB Chris Leak (Florida); Defense: DE Derrick Harvey (Florida)
- Favorite: Ohio State by 7
- National anthem: U.S. Military Academy Cadet Glee Club
- Referee: Jack Folliard (Pac-10)
- Halftime show: Ohio State and Florida bands; Habitat for Humanity presentation
- Attendance: 74,628

United States TV coverage
- Network: Fox
- Announcers: Thom Brennaman, Barry Alvarez, and Charles Davis
- Nielsen ratings: 17.4, 28.8M viewers, 27 share

The 2007 Tostitos BCS National Championship Game was an American football game played at the University of Phoenix Stadium in Glendale, Arizona, on January 8, 2007, and featured the top-ranked Big Ten champion Ohio State Buckeyes against the 2nd-ranked SEC champion Florida Gators. The Gators routed the Buckeyes by a final score of 41–14 to win their first national championship since 1996.

The Buckeyes secured a spot by finishing the regular season undefeated and ranked #1 in the BCS. It was the first time the Buckeyes and Gators had ever met on the football field. The 12–1 Florida Gators earned a spot after defeating Arkansas in the SEC Championship Game in early December, and jumping from #4 to #2 in the final BCS Rankings, passing #3 Michigan and previous #2 USC.

The game was the first BCS National Championship Game to be televised on the Fox TV network, as well as the first time the BCS had held a standalone national championship game (previously, one of the 4 BCS bowls had served as the national championship game).

== Pre-game buildup ==
The Ohio State Buckeyes were the No. 1 ranked team for the entire 2006 NCAA Division I FBS football season, anchored by Heisman Trophy winning quarterback Troy Smith. The Buckeyes were 12–0 with several wins over ranked opponents: the defending national champions, then No. 2 Texas Longhorns, then No. 24 Penn State Nittany Lions, then No. 13 Iowa Hawkeyes, and their then undefeated Big Ten Conference rival, then No. 2 Michigan. The win over Michigan to finish the regular season essentially guaranteed the Buckeyes a spot in the National Championship game. Who they would play remained a highly debated question. Despite the loss to Ohio State, Michigan remained No. 2 in the polls, followed by No. 3 Southern California (USC), No. 4 Florida, and No. 5 Notre Dame.

The next week, with both No. 1 Ohio State and No. 2 Michigan's regular season complete, No. 3 USC defeated then No. 5 Notre Dame. Fourth-ranked Florida defeated unranked in-state rival Florida State. With the victory over Notre Dame, USC passed Michigan in the polls, taking over the BCS No. 2 spot. Michigan fell to No. 3 with Florida remaining No. 4 and Notre Dame falling to No. 10.

The last week of the regular season was dynamic for the national championship race. Third-ranked Michigan remained idle. Fourth-ranked Florida faced No. 9 Arkansas in the SEC Championship, while No. 2 USC faced unranked, in-city rival UCLA. Both Florida and Michigan cheered as USC fell to UCLA 13–9. Florida defeated Arkansas 38–28 to claim the 2006 SEC Championship Title. USC's loss knocked them out of contention, leaving No. 3 Michigan and No. 4 Florida as the most likely teams to earn the No. 2 ranking and face Ohio State for the BCS National Championship. The final BCS poll passed Florida over Michigan to take the No. 2 spot while Michigan remained unchanged at No. 3, with .0101 points separating the two teams. This small difference was a result of the human polls (the Coaches Poll and Harris Interactive Poll) ranking Florida above Michigan while the computer polls had the two teams tied for second.

=== Controversy over No. 2: Rematch or new opponent? ===
There were many theories how Florida jumped Michigan in the final poll. Some sportswriters theorized that it was not a matter of which was the better team, claiming Florida had an advantage in the polls because they had played the last two weeks while Michigan had not, or that voters were swayed due to Florida coach Urban Meyer's "campaign" to get Florida into the BCS National Championship Game. The fact that the difference in the final BCS Poll was due to human voters, not computer rankings, gives some credence to these theories. Other theories suggest that since Michigan did not win their conference title, they did not deserve to play for the BCS National Championship, or that a rematch between Michigan and Ohio State was not favored by the poll voters. The controversy was largely resolved when USC defeated Michigan 32–18 in the 2007 Rose Bowl, and Florida beat top-ranked Ohio State 41–14 in the BCS Championship Game.

== Game summary ==
=== First half ===
The Buckeyes got off to a fast start when receiver Ted Ginn Jr. returned the opening kickoff 93 yards for a touchdown, giving Ohio State a 7–0 lead only 16 seconds into the game. During the celebration following the return, Ginn was injured and would miss the remainder of the game. The Gators quickly rebounded, however, leading a quick 46-yard drive for a score, capped off by a 14-yard touchdown pass from Chris Leak to Dallas Baker. After stuffing the Ohio State offense to a quick punt, Florida drove 36 yards for a touchdown on a 4-yard run by Percy Harvin. On their next possession, the Gators once again drove in for a score, going 71 yards on 10 plays and getting it in the end zone on a 2-yard run by DeShawn Wynn on the first play of the second quarter.

Ohio State came back for a score of their own with an 18-yard touchdown run by Antonio Pittman to bring the score to 21–14. After a Florida field goal, Ohio State coach Jim Tressel took a gamble by going for a fourth-and-one from the Buckeyes' own 29-yard line. The Gator defensive line stopped Chris Wells in his tracks and the ball was turned over on downs. Chris Hetland, Florida's much-maligned kicker who was only 4-of-13 for the year, hit his second field goal of the night, making the score 27–14, and with just over two minutes left to play in the half, it appeared that would be the score heading to the break. As Ohio State started from their own 20, quarterback Troy Smith dropped back to pass and was hit by Florida lineman Jarvis Moss, jarring the ball loose. Florida recovered on the Buckeye 5-yard line and punched it in with a one-yard touchdown pass from quarterback Tim Tebow to Andre Caldwell. The half ended and the teams went off the field with Florida leading 34–14.

=== Second half ===
The second half saw a much more defensive game, with no scoring in the third quarter. The Gator offense used up the clock, while the defense continued to stifle Ohio State's purportedly explosive attack. The lone score of the half came with just over 10 minutes left in the game, when Tim Tebow ran in a one-yard touchdown score, bringing the tally to 41–14, which was the final score.

Chris Leak was named the offensive player of the game, and Derrick Harvey earned the defensive honors. The Gators held the Buckeye offense to only 82 total yards for the game, and Heisman Trophy winner Troy Smith completed only four passes for 35 yards and an interception. The Gators also dominated in time of possession, limiting the Ohio State offense to just over 19 minutes.

=== Scoring summary ===
Quarter	1	2	3	4	Total
Florida	14	20	0	7	41
Ohio State	7	7	0	0	14

at University of Phoenix Stadium, Glendale, Arizona

- Date: January 8, 2007
- Game time: 8 p.m. EST / 6 p.m. MST
- Game attendance: 74,628
- Recap

Scoring Play	Time	Score
1st quarter
Ted Ginn Jr. – 93-yard kickoff return for TD	14:44	OSU 7–0
Chris Leak – 14-yard pass to Dallas Baker	10:31	Tie 7–7
Percy Harvin – 4-yard TD rush	5:51	UF 14–7
2nd quarter
DeShawn Wynn – 2-yard TD rush	14:56	UF 21–7
Antonio Pittman – 18-yard TD rush	13:32	UF 21–14
Chris Hetland – 43-yard FG	6:00	UF 24–14
Chris Hetland – 40-yard FG	1:53	UF 27–14
Tim Tebow – 1-yard TD pass to Andre Caldwell	0:23	UF 34–14
3rd quarter
No scoring
4th quarter
Tim Tebow – 1-yard TD rush	10:20	UF 41–14

== Aftermath and legacy ==
In retrospect, the 2007 BCS National Championship Game was arguably a turning point in the history of college football, ushering in an era of dominance for the SEC and the Southeast, in general. The 2006 season was the first of seven consecutive national championships won by the SEC. A school from outside that conference did not win a national championship again until the 2013 Florida State team.

Between 2006 and 2022, schools from the SEC won 13 of the 17 national championships. Between 2006 and 2022, schools from the Southeastern United States won 16 of the 17 national championships.

== Game records ==
Individual	Performance, Team vs. Opponent	Year
Field goals	2, Chris Hetland, Florida vs. Ohio State (tied with 3 others)	2007
Sacks	3, Derrick Harvey, Florida vs. Ohio State	2007
Long Plays	Performance, Team vs. Opponent	Year
Kickoff return	93, Ted Ginn Jr., Ohio State vs. Florida (TD)	2007

== Trivia ==
- Florida later defeated Ohio State 84–75 in the 2007 NCAA Division I Men's Basketball Championship Game on April 2, 2007, marking both the first time in NCAA history that the same two schools have played for the football and basketball championships in the same year and the first time that a school has held both the football and basketball championships in the same academic and calendar year.
- This marked the first year in history that the losing team in both the college football national championship game and the Super Bowl returned the opening kickoff for a touchdown. Chicago Bears wide receiver/returner Devin Hester took the Super Bowl kickoff for a touchdown against the Indianapolis Colts in Super Bowl XLI. The Colts won 29–17.
- This was the first of the SEC's streak of seven consecutive national championships. The streak would not be broken until Florida State defeated Auburn in the 2014 BCS National Championship Game.
- This was the first time these two teams faced each other in football. The next football game between Florida and Ohio State would not occur until the 2012 Gator Bowl, which was notable for being a matchup between Urban Meyer's former team and the team he had just been hired to coach at that point, and was therefore nicknamed the "Urban Meyer Bowl" even though he had no role in the game itself. Florida won that game as well, 24–17.
