= Mike Jones (offensive lineman) =

American football player (born 1985)

No. 76
- Position: Offensive guard

Personal information
- Born: June 25, 1985 (age 41); Chicago Ridge, Illinois, U.S.
- Listed height: 6 ft 5 in (1.96 m)
- Listed weight: 309 lb (140 kg)

Career information
- College: Iowa Games played: 43 Games started: 43
- NFL draft: 2007: undrafted

Career history
- San Diego Chargers (2007)*; Chicago Bears (2007)*; Minnesota Vikings (2008)*
- * Offseason or practice squad member only

Awards and highlights
- Freshman All-American (2003); Honorable Mention All-Big Ten (2004); First-team All-Big Ten (2006); Scout.com All-America Team (2006)

Michael Jones (born June 25, 1985) is an American former football offensive guard. He was signed by the San Diego Chargers as an undrafted free agent in 2007. He played college football at Iowa.

Pre-draft measurables
Height	Weight	Arm length	Hand span	40-yard dash	10-yard split	20-yard split	20-yard shuttle	Three-cone drill	Vertical jump	Broad jump	Bench press
6 ft 5 in (1.96 m)	309 lb (140 kg)	33 3/8 in (0.85 m)	10 3/8 in (0.26 m)	5.46 s	1.79 s	3.09 s	4.73 s	7.77 s	30.0 in (0.76 m)	8 ft 3 in (2.51 m)	26 reps
All values from NFL Combine/Pro Day

Jones was also a member of the Chicago Bears and Minnesota Vikings.
