= Doug Datish =

American football player (born 1983)

No. 50
- Positions: Center, guard

Personal information
- Born: August 1, 1983 (age 43); Warren, Ohio, U.S.
- Listed height: 6 ft 4 in (1.93 m)
- Listed weight: 305 lb (138 kg)

Career information
- High school: Howland (Warren)
- College: Ohio State
- NFL draft: 2007: 6th round, 198th overall pick

Career history
- Atlanta Falcons (2007); Indianapolis Colts (2008)*; Atlanta Falcons (2008)*; Tennessee Titans (2008–2009)
- * Offseason or practice squad member only

Awards and highlights
- BCS national champion (2002); First-team All-Big Ten (2006)

Doug Datish (/ˈdætɪʃ/ DAT-ish; born August 1, 1983) is an American former professional football player who was a center in the National Football League (NFL). He played college football for the Ohio State Buckeyes. He was selected by the Atlanta Falcons in the sixth round of the 2007 NFL draft. Datish was also a member of the Indianapolis Colts and Tennessee Titans.

== Early life ==
Datish was a standout player on both offense and defense at Howland High School. As a senior, he was selected as the Associated Press Division II Co-Defensive player of the year and was first-team All-Ohio. He was ranked as the fifth-best offensive lineman in the country by SuperPrep. He and his wife, Karli, reside in Warren, Ohio.
