= Brandon Mitchell (safety) =

American football player (born 1983), Legal Advisor

No. 33, 42
- Position: Safety

Personal information
- Born: October 26, 1983 (age 43); Atlanta, Georgia, U.S.
- Listed height: 6 ft 3 in (1.91 m)
- Listed weight: 206 lb (93 kg)

Career information
- College: Ohio State
- NFL draft: 2007: undrafted

Career history
- Houston Texans (2007–2008)*; Cleveland Browns (2008)*
- * Offseason or practice squad member only

Awards and highlights
- BCS national champion (2002); Second-team All-Big Ten (2006)

Brandon Mitchell (born October 26, 1983) is an American former professional football player who was a safety.

Mitchell played high school football at Benjamin E. Mays High School in Atlanta. He played college football for the Ohio State Buckeyes and was signed by the Houston Texans of the National Football League (NFL) as an undrafted free agent in 2007.
