= 2006 All-Big Ten Conference football team =

American college football all-star team

The 2006 All-Big Ten Conference football team consists of American football players chosen as All-Big Ten Conference players for the 2006 Big Ten Conference football season. The conference recognizes two official All-Big Ten selectors: (1) the Big Ten conference coaches selected separate offensive and defensive units and named first- and second-team players (the "Coaches" team); and (2) a panel of sports writers and broadcasters covering the Big Ten also selected offensive and defensive units and named first- and second-team players (the "Media" team).

== Offensive selections ==
=== Quarterbacks ===
- Troy Smith, Ohio State (Coaches-1; Media-1) (2006 Heisman Trophy)
- Chad Henne, Michigan (Coaches-2; Media-2)

=== Running backs ===
- Mike Hart, Michigan (Coaches-1; Media-1)
- Antonio Pittman, Ohio State (Coaches-1; Media-2)
- P. J. Hill, Wisconsin (Coaches-2; Media-1)
- Tony Hunt, Penn State (Coaches-2; Media-2)

=== Receivers ===
- Mario Manningham, Michigan (Coaches-1; Media-2)
- Ted Ginn Jr., Ohio State (Coaches-2; Media-1)
- Dorien Bryant, Purdue (Coaches-2; Media-1)
- Anthony Gonzalez, Ohio State (Coaches-1)
- James Hardy, Indiana (Coaches-2)

=== Centers ===
- Doug Datish, Ohio State (Coaches-1; Media-1)
- Mark Bihl, Michigan (Coaches-2; Media-2)

=== Guards ===
- T. J. Downing, Ohio State (Coaches-1; Media-1)
- Mike Jones, Iowa (Coaches-1; Media-2)
- Adam Kraus, Michigan (Coaches-2; Media-1)
- Kyle Cook, Michigan State (Coaches-2)
- Jordan Grimes, Purdue (Media-2)

=== Tackles ===
- Jake Long, Michigan (Coaches-1; Media-1)
- Joe Thomas, Wisconsin (Coaches-1; Media-1)
- Levi Brown, Penn State (Coaches-2; Media-2)
- Marshal Yanda, Iowa (Coaches-2)
- Mike Otto, Purdue (Coaches-2)
- Kirk Barton, Ohio State (Media-2)

=== Tight ends ===
- Matt Spaeth, Minnesota (Coaches-1; Media-1)
- Scott Chandler, Iowa (Coaches-2)
- Travis Beckum, Wisconsin (Media-2)

== Defensive selections ==
=== Defensive linemen ===
- Alan Branch, Michigan (Coaches-1; Media-1)
- LaMarr Woodley, Michigan (Coaches-1; Media-1)
- Quinn Pitcock, Ohio State (Coaches-1; Media-1)
- Anthony Spencer, Purdue (Coaches-1; Media-1)
- Vernon Gholston, Ohio State (Coaches-2; Media-2)
- Jay Alford, Penn State (Coaches-2; Media-2)
- Matt Shaughnessy, Wisconsin (Coaches-2; Media-2)
- David Patterson, Ohio State (Coaches-2)
- Willie Vandesteeg, Minnesota (Media-2)

=== Linebackers ===
- James Laurinaitis, Ohio State (Coaches-1, Media-1)
- Paul Posluszny, Penn State (Coaches-1, Media-1)
- David Harris, Michigan (Coaches-1, Media-2)
- J Leman, Illinois (Coaches-2, Media-1)
- Shawn Crable, Michigan (Coaches-2)
- Dan Connor, Penn State (Coaches-2, Media-2)
- Mike Klinkenborg, Iowa (Media-2)

=== Defensive backs ===
- Leon Hall, Michigan (Coaches-1, Media-1)
- Malcolm Jenkins, Ohio State (Coaches-1, Media-1)
- Antonio Smith, Ohio State (Coaches-1, Media-1)
- Jack Ikegwuonu, Wisconsin (Coaches-1, Media-2)
- Marcus Paschal, Iowa (Coaches-2)
- Jamar Adams, Michigan (Coaches-2)
- Brandon Mitchell, Ohio State (Coaches-2, Media-2)
- Justin King, Penn State (Coaches-2)
- Anthony Scirrotto, Penn State (Media-1)
- Tracy Porter, Indiana (Media-2)
- Roderick Rogers, Wisconsin (Media-2)

== Special teams ==
=== Kickers ===
- Garrett Rivas, Michigan (Coaches-1; Media-1)
- Taylor Mehlhaff, Wisconsin (Coaches-2; Media-2)

=== Punters ===
- Brandon Fields, Michigan State (Coaches-1; Media-1)
- Jeremy Kapinos, Penn State (Coaches-2; Media-2)

== Key ==
Bold = selected as a first-team player by both the coaches and media panel

Coaches = selected by Big Ten Conference coaches

Media = selected by a media panel

HM = Honorable mention

== See also ==
- 2006 College Football All-America Team
