= Kirk Barton =

American football player and coach (born 1984)

No. 69
- Position: Guard

Personal information
- Born: November 4, 1984 (age 42); Naples, Florida, U.S.
- Listed height: 6 ft 5 in (1.96 m)
- Listed weight: 303 lb (137 kg)

Career information
- College: Ohio State (2003–2007)
- NFL draft: 2008: 7th round, 247th overall pick

Career history
- Chicago Bears (2008); Miami Dolphins (2008); San Francisco 49ers (2008); Miami Dolphins (2008)*; Cincinnati Bengals (2008); Detroit Lions (2009)*; San Francisco 49ers (2009)*; Detroit Lions (2010)*; Denver Broncos (2010)*; Carolina Panthers (2010)*
- * Offseason or practice squad member only

Awards and highlights
- First-team All-American (2007); First-team All-Big Ten (2007); Second-team All-Big Ten (2006)

Career NFL statistics
- Games played: 1
- Stats at Pro Football Reference

Kirk Barton (born November 4, 1984) is an American former professional football player who was a guard in the National Football League (NFL). He played college football for the Ohio State Buckeyes, and he played in the NFL for one game for the Chicago Bears in 2008. He was selected by the Bears in the seventh round of the 2008 NFL draft.

On June 21, 2025, Barton was arrested and charged with aggravated vehicular manslaughter in relation to a fatal crash that occurred in Dublin, Ohio.
