= David Patterson (American football) =

American gridiron football player (born 1985)

David Bernard Patterson Jr
No. 66
- Position: Defensive tackle

Personal information
- Born: February 11, 1985 (age 41); Cleveland, Ohio, U.S.
- Listed height: 6 ft 2.5 in (1.89 m)
- Listed weight: 305 lb (138 kg)

Career information
- College: Ohio State
- NFL draft: 2007: undrafted

Career history
- Atlanta Falcons (2007–2008)*; Saskatchewan Roughriders (2009)*
- * Offseason or practice squad member only

Awards and highlights
- Second-team All-Big Ten (2006)

David Bernard Patterson Jr (born February 11, 1985) is a former American and Canadian football defensive tackle. He was signed by the Falcons in 2007. He played college football at Ohio State University. He played his high school football at Warrensville Heights High School in Warrensville Heights, Ohio, under head coach Dan Thorpe.

Patterson married the model Anansa Sims and the two appeared together on the reality television series Beverly's Full House on the Oprah Winfrey Network.
