= Antonio Smith (cornerback) =

American football player (born 1984)

No. 37
- Position: Cornerback

Personal information
- Born: June 12, 1984 (age 42); Columbus, Ohio, U.S.
- Listed height: 5 ft 9 in (1.75 m)
- Listed weight: 190 lb (86 kg)

Career information
- College: Ohio State
- NFL draft: 2007: undrafted

Career history
- Indianapolis Colts (2007); Detroit Lions (2008–2009)*; San Diego Chargers (2009)*; Cincinnati Bengals (2009–2010)*
- * Offseason or practice squad member only

Awards and highlights
- BCS national champion (2002); First-team All-Big Ten (2006)
- Stats at Pro Football Reference

Antonio Smith (born June 12, 1984) is an American former professional football player who was a cornerback in the National Football League (NFL). He played college football for the Ohio State Buckeyes and was signed by the Indianapolis Colts as an undrafted free agent in 2007.

Smith was also a member of the Detroit Lions, San Diego Chargers and Cincinnati Bengals.

Pre-draft measurables
Height	Weight
5 ft 9 1/4 in (1.76 m)	195 lb (88 kg)
Values from Pro Day

== Biography ==
Shortly after finishing his career at Beechcroft High School, he went on to the Ohio State University.
