= Quinn Pitcock =

American football player (born 1983)

No. 95, 97
- Position: Defensive tackle

Personal information
- Born: September 14, 1983 (age 43); Piqua, Ohio, U.S.
- Listed height: 6 ft 2 in (1.88 m)
- Listed weight: 329 lb (149 kg)

Career information
- High school: Piqua
- College: Ohio State
- NFL draft: 2007: 3rd round, 98th overall pick

Career history
- Indianapolis Colts (2007); Seattle Seahawks (2010)*; Detroit Lions (2011)*; Orlando Predators (2012–2013); Arizona Rattlers (2014–2015)
- * Offseason or practice squad member only

Awards and highlights
- ArenaBowl champion (2014); BCS national champion (2002); Bill Willis Trophy (2006); Consensus All-American (2006); First-team All-Big Ten (2006); Second-team All-Big Ten (2005)

Career NFL statistics
- Total tackles: 18
- Sacks: 1.5
- Stats at Pro Football Reference

Career AFL statistics
- Total tackles: 13
- Sacks: 5.5
- Forced fumbles: 1
- Stats at ArenaFan.com

Quinn Michael Pitcock (born September 14, 1983) is an American former professional football player who was a defensive tackle in the National Football League (NFL). He played college football for the Ohio State Buckeyes, earning consensus All-American honors in 2006. He was selected by the Indianapolis Colts in the third round of the 2007 NFL draft and played one season for the Colts.

== Early life ==
Pitcock was born in Piqua, Ohio. He attended Piqua High School, and played defensive tackle for the Piqua Indians high school football. He received all-state honors as a senior in 2001, and was rated as a Top 100 college prospect by Scout.com.

== College career ==
Pitcock attended Ohio State University, where he played for coach Jim Tressel's Ohio State Buckeyes football team from 2002 to 2006. As a junior in 2005, he was a second-team All-Big Ten selection; as a senior in 2006, he was a first-team All-Big Ten selection and a consensus first-team All-American, and was awarded the Bill Willis Trophy.

== Professional career ==
Pitcock was selected by the Indianapolis Colts in the third round (98th overall) of the 2007 NFL draft. He opted to retire after just one season in the NFL due to bouts of depression and video game addiction.

During his retirement, the Indianapolis Colts and Quinn's agents helped him to rehab after being diagnosed with mild depression and ADHD. The Colts considered letting him compete for a roster spot during their 2010 training camp, but felt it would be a distraction to the team.

After being waived from the reserve/did not report list by the Colts, Pitcock officially came out of retirement and signed with the Seattle Seahawks on August 4, 2010. However, he was waived by the Seahawks during final cuts on September 4.

On July 29, 2011, Pitcock signed with the Detroit Lions.

Pitcock was assigned to the Orlando Predators of the Arena Football League in 2012. On January 16, 2014, Pitcock was traded to the Arizona Rattlers in exchange for LaMark Brown, Joe Gibbs, Arness Ikner, and Justin Wells.
