= Antonio Pittman =

American football player (born 1985)

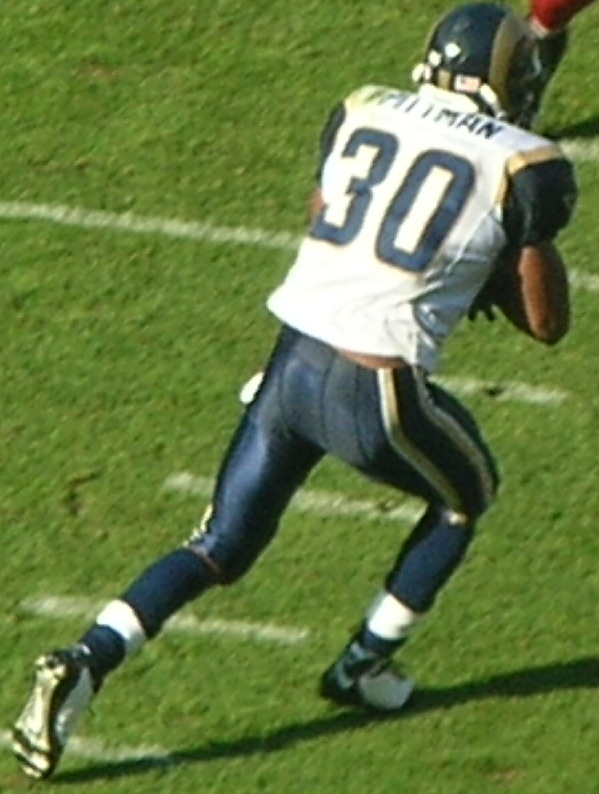
- Pittman with the St. Louis Rams in 2008

No. 30, 33
- Position: Running back

Personal information
- Born: December 19, 1985 (age 40); Akron, Ohio, U.S.
- Listed height: 5 ft 11 in (1.80 m)
- Listed weight: 207 lb (94 kg)

Career information
- High school: Buchtel (Akron)
- College: Ohio State
- NFL draft: 2007: 4th round, 107th overall pick

Career history
- New Orleans Saints (2007)*; St. Louis Rams (2007–2008); Omaha Nighthawks (2012)
- * Offseason or practice squad member only

Awards and highlights
- First-team All-Big Ten (2006)

Career NFL statistics
- Rushing attempts: 117
- Rushing yards: 435
- Receptions: 21
- Receiving yards: 147
- Stats at Pro Football Reference

Antonio Pittman (born December 19, 1985) is an American former professional football player who was a running back for the St. Louis Rams of the National Football League (NFL). He played college football for the Ohio State Buckeyes. After his football career, he became a firefighter.

== Early life ==
Pittman attended Buchtel High School in Akron, Ohio, where he earned All-Ohio honors as a senior. Pittman majored in African American and African Studies at Ohio State. On Pittman's left arm is a tattoo honoring his brother, Anthony, who died at the age of 23. While in high school Pittman lived with his sister. He has one daughter, Keilyn.

== College career ==
=== 2005 ===
Despite a slow start to the 2005 season, he finished the year with 1,331 yards rushing and seven touchdowns on 243 carries. His rushing yardage was the 10th-best single-season mark in school history and only Archie Griffin gained more yards (1,577) as a sophomore. His rushing total was the 11th highest in the NCAA that season and 5th best in the Big Ten Conference. In addition to running, Pittman made 17 receptions for 161 yards in 2005.

In his first appearance, Pittman rushed for 100 yards on 14 carries against Miami University. His career-high is 186 yards in a game against the University of Minnesota, where he also scored his first touchdown of the season. He scored the winning touchdown in the 2005 game against the Michigan Wolverines. His run around the Michigan defensive line for a three-yard touchdown run came with just 24 seconds left in the game. In the next game, he clinched the 2006 Tostitos Fiesta Bowl against the Notre Dame Fighting Irish by erupting for a 60-yard touchdown run with 1:46 left in the game, despite having an injured hamstring. In 2005, he became just the fourth sophomore in Ohio State annals to rush for 1,000 or more yards in a season, joining Archie Griffin, Vince Workman and Keith Byars.

=== 2006 ===
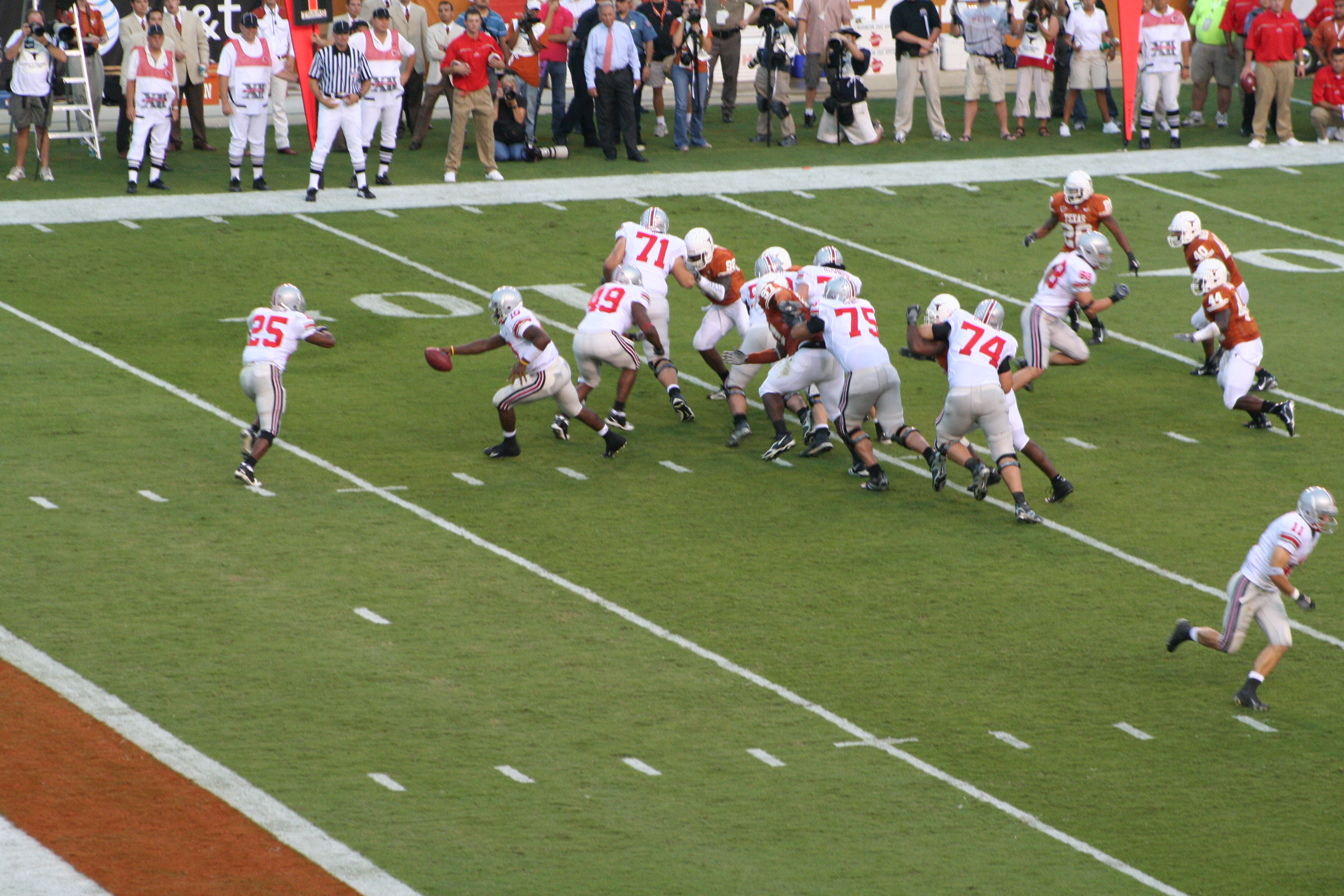
Troy Smith hands off to Pittman against Texas

In 2006, quarterback Troy Smith said of Pittman, "Everybody knows who he is in the state of Ohio, but I think nationally, he's one of the top three backs."

Pittman averaged more than five yards per carry in his three seasons, playing in 35 games, rushing for an average of 84 yards per game. He currently ranks 8th on Ohio State's all-time rushing list.

At the beginning of the 2006 season some called for split playing time between Pittman and freshman Chris Wells, another Akron native. However, Pittman's strong resume in 2005 and early successes guaranteed his role as starter.

As the starting running back, Pittman displayed the ability to compile impressive statistics. In games against Northern Illinois, Cincinnati, Penn State, and Iowa he rushed for over 100 yards and scored touchdowns. Also, during the game at then #2 Texas he scored a touchdown. Against the Florida Gators in the BCS National Championship, Pittman rushed for 62 yards and one of Ohio State's two scores. On January 15, 2007, Pittman made the decision to forgo his senior year and declared himself eligible for the NFL draft.

=== College statistics ===
Year	Team	G	Att	Yards	Avg	TD
2004	Ohio State Buckeyes	10	72	381	5.3	1
2005	Ohio State Buckeyes	12	243	1,331	5.5	7
2006	Ohio State Buckeyes	13	242	1,275	5.3	14
Total		35	557	2,945	5.3	22

== Professional career ==
Pre-draft measurables
Height	Weight	Arm length	Hand span	40-yard dash	10-yard split	20-yard split	20-yard shuttle	Three-cone drill	Vertical jump	Broad jump	Bench press
5 ft 10 3/4 in (1.80 m)	207 lb (94 kg)	31 1/2 in (0.80 m)	8 1/2 in (0.22 m)	4.44 s	1.54 s	2.57 s	4.16 s	6.84 s	35.5 in (0.90 m)	10 ft 3 in (3.12 m)	16 reps
All values from NFL Combine

=== New Orleans Saints ===
Antonio Pittman was selected in the 4th round of the 2007 NFL draft by the New Orleans Saints. Pittman was cut on September 1, 2007, to make room on the roster for Pierre Thomas.

=== St. Louis Rams ===
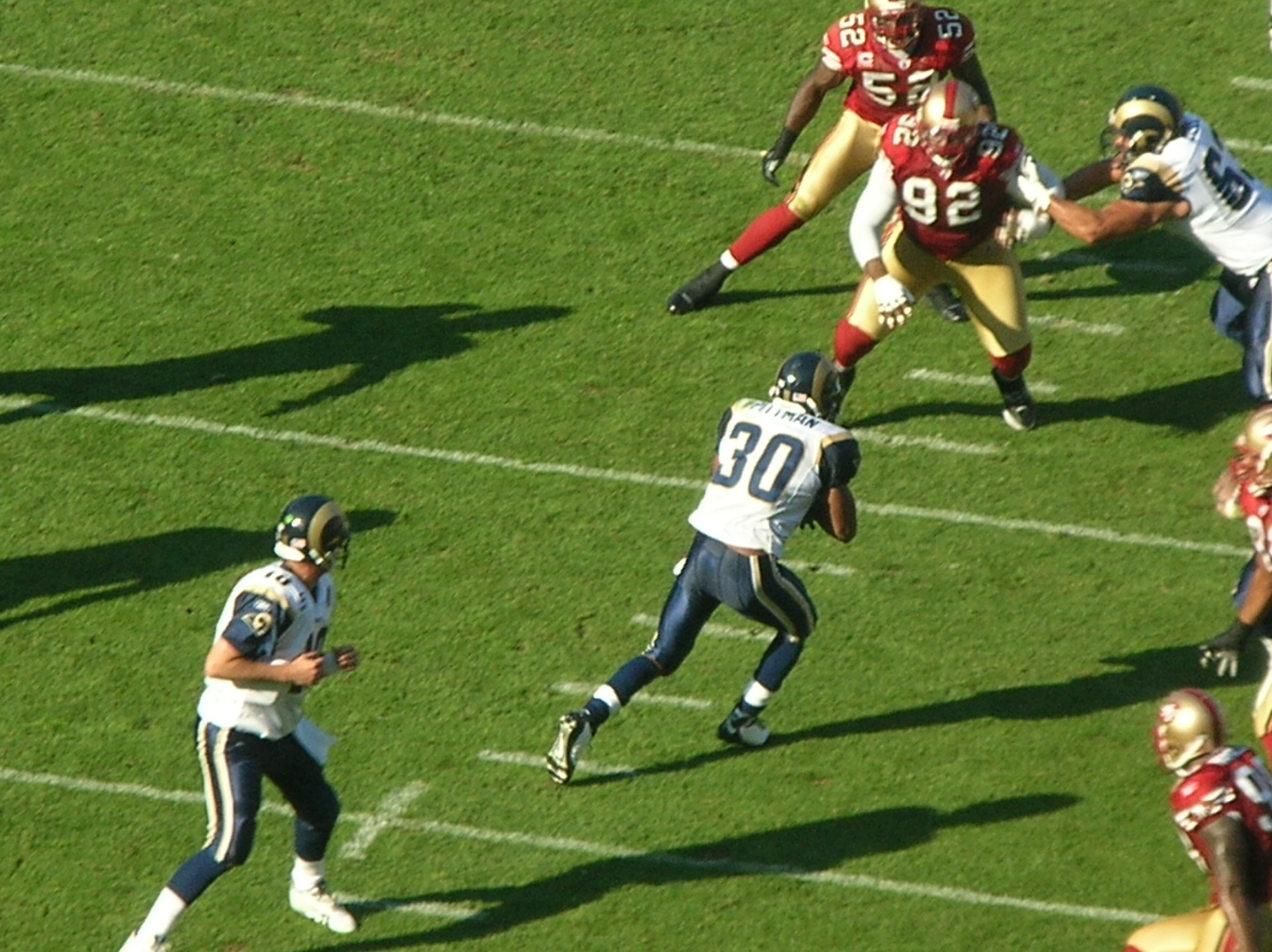
Pittman carries the ball against the San Francisco 49ers in November 2008.

Pittman was claimed off of waivers by the St. Louis Rams the day after he was released by the Saints. Pittman played in 11 games for the Rams. He saw action as a reserve running back and on special teams. For the season he rushed 38 times for 139 yards and added three receptions for 15 yards. In 2008 Pittman played in 12 games and started five in place of Steven Jackson. He carried the ball 79 times for 296 yards and no touchdowns. He caught 18 passes for 132 yards.

Pittman was waived on September 5, 2009.

=== Omaha Nighthawks ===
Pittman played for the Omaha Nighthawks in 2012.

== Personal ==
On September 4, 2015, Pittman graduated from the Ohio Fire Academy with the intent of becoming a firefighter. On December 14, 2017, he joined the Middletown Division of Fire. Pittman would later join the Columbus Division of Fire in 2020.
