= Beanie Wells =

American football player (born 1988)

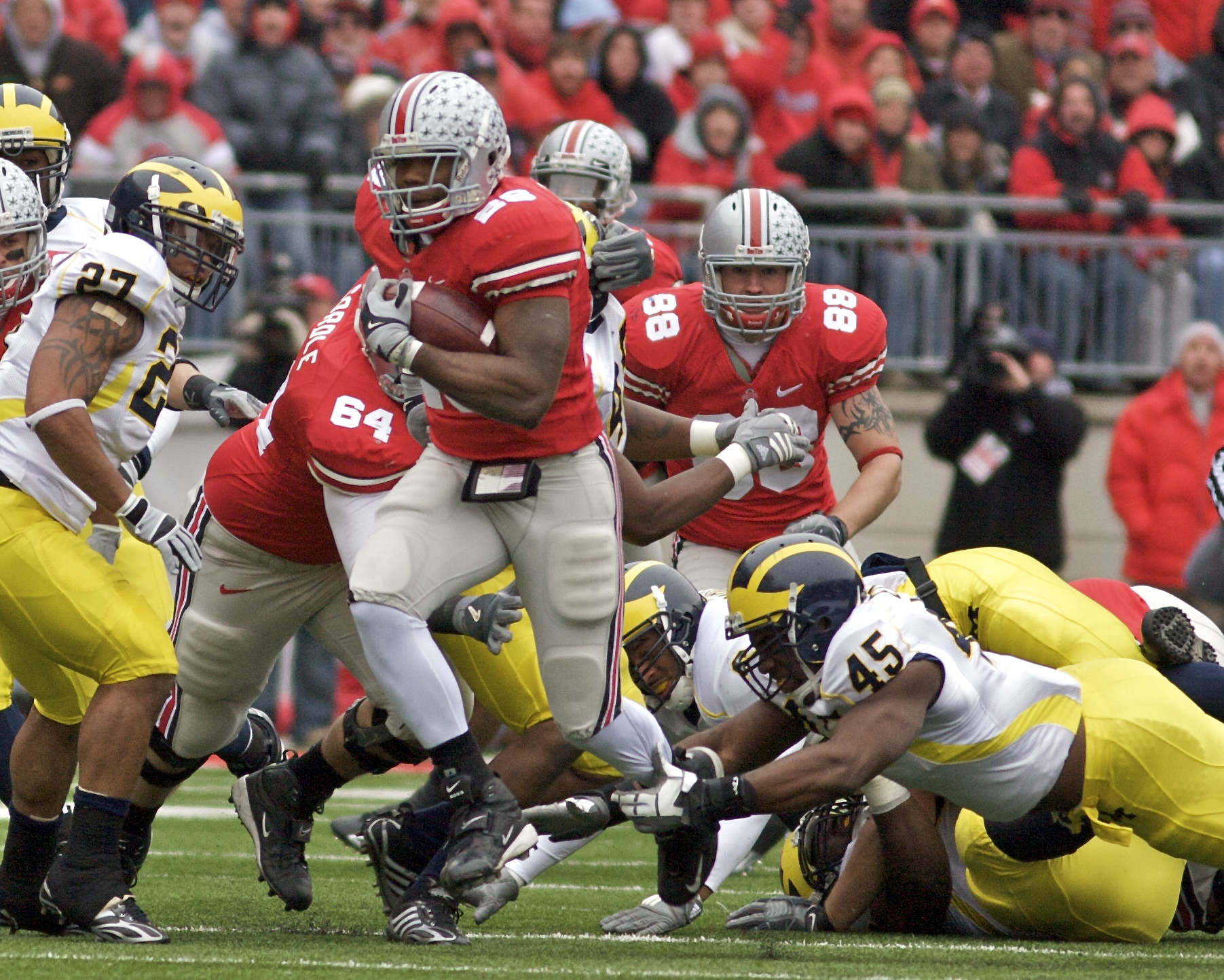
- Wells (center) with the Ohio State Buckeyes in 2008

No. 26
- Position: Running back

Personal information
- Born: August 7, 1988 (age 38); Akron, Ohio, U.S.
- Listed height: 6 ft 2 in (1.88 m)
- Listed weight: 229 lb (104 kg)

Career information
- High school: Garfield (Akron)
- College: Ohio State (2006–2008)
- NFL draft: 2009: 1st round, 31st overall pick

Career history
- Arizona Cardinals (2009–2012)

Awards and highlights
- PFWA All-Rookie Team (2009); First-team All-Big Ten (2007); Second-team All-Big Ten (2008)

Career NFL statistics
- Rushing attempts: 625
- Rushing yards: 2,471
- Receptions: 28
- Receiving yards: 293
- Total touchdowns: 24
- Stats at Pro Football Reference

Christopher Michael Wells (born August 7, 1988), known as Chris Wells or Beanie Wells, is an American former professional football player who was a running back for the Arizona Cardinals of the National Football League (NFL). He played college football for the Ohio State Buckeyes and was selected by the Cardinals in the first round of the 2009 NFL draft with the 31st overall pick.

== Early life ==
Wells was a highly touted player out of high school, where he played football at Akron Garfield High School and ran track. His high school running back coach, Ben Dunn, said that Beanie was one of the most explosive play-makers he had seen in his 28 years at the school. He was often considered the best recruit out of Ohio. Wells played at Akron Garfield High from 2002 to 2005, graduating early in December. In track, he was timed at 10.8 seconds in the 100 meters as a high school junior, and also recorded a 4.48 40-yard dash as a senior. He was listed as the top running back and All-American by Parade in 2006.

Wells was offered to play at schools such as Michigan and USC, but he always knew he was going to play at Ohio State, saying "I think I came out of my mom's womb wanting to go to Ohio State."

== College career ==
Beanie's number during his career at Ohio State was #28.

During Wells's freshman year, he shared carries with Antonio Pittman, had a solid freshman year, and was a big part of the 2006 Buckeyes. In his collegiate debut, he had ten carries for 50 rushing yards and a touchdown against Northern Illinois. The highlight of his freshman year came in the Ohio State–Michigan game where he broke a 52-yard run for a touchdown that put the Buckeyes ahead of the Wolverines for the rest of the game.

With Antonio Pittman going into the 2007 NFL draft, Wells became the starting running back and started every game in his sophomore year for Ohio State. On October 20, Wells had 21 carries for 221 rushing yards and one rushing touchdown in a victory over Michigan State. On November 17, Wells rushed for 222 yards in the annual rivalry game against Michigan, the second most rushing yards by an Ohio State running back against Michigan. He led the Big Ten Conference in rushing attempts with 274 in the 2007 season.

As a junior, Wells rushed 13 carries for 111 yards and a touchdown in his first game against the Youngstown State Penguins on August 30, 2008. He also suffered a foot injury. After missing three games, he returned to the starting lineup September 27, 2008, against Minnesota, where he rushed for 106 yards on 14 carries. He then followed that performance up with a 22 carry, 168 yard effort against Wisconsin, which included a 33-yard touchdown on the game's first possession and a 54-yard run to start the second half. In the November 15 game against Illinois, Wells leaped over an Illini defender.

== Professional career ==
Pre-draft measurables
Height	Weight	Arm length	Hand span	40-yard dash	10-yard split	20-yard split	Vertical jump	Broad jump	Bench press
6 ft 1 in (1.85 m)	235 lb (107 kg)	33 5/8 in (0.85 m)	10 in (0.25 m)	4.38 s	1.50 s	2.51 s	33.5 in (0.85 m)	10 ft 8 in (3.25 m)	25 reps
All values from NFL Combine/Pro Day

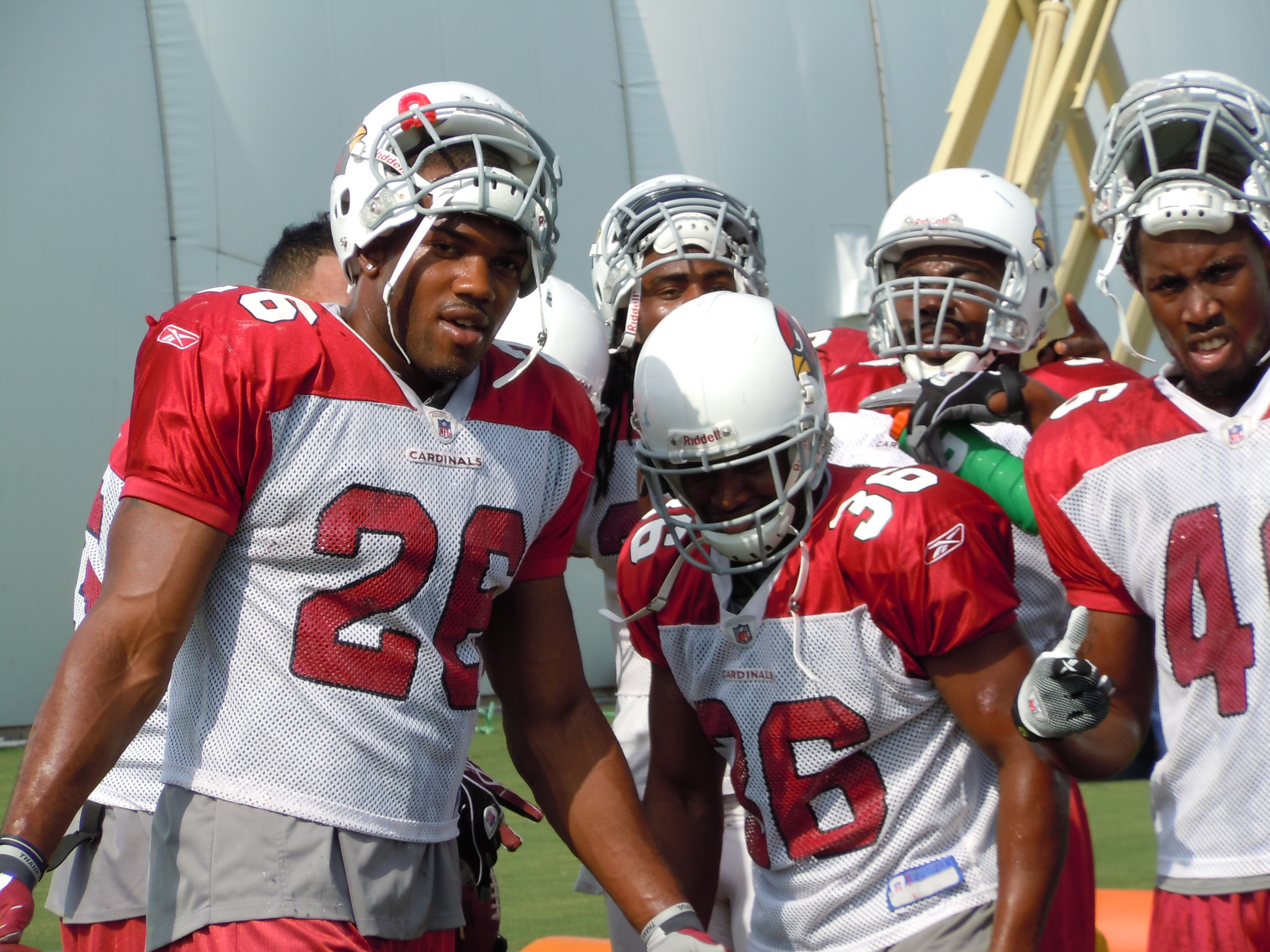
Wells (left) and teammates during 2010 preseason camp.

Wells was selected in the first round (31st overall) by the Arizona Cardinals in the 2009 NFL draft. He competed for the starting running back job with Tim Hightower.

On August 1, 2009, Wells was signed to a five-year contract. Later that day, he was carted off from practice with an ankle injury.

In Week 1 of the 2009 season, Wells made his NFL debut with seven carries for 29 yards against the San Francisco 49ers in a 20–16 loss. In Week 7, in the second quarter against the New York Giants, Wells ran 13 yards for his first NFL touchdown. In that game, Wells rushed for 67 yards on 14 attempts. In Week 15, Wells had his first career 100-yard game, against the Detroit Lions, with 17 carries for 110 yards and a touchdown. In the Divisional Round of the playoffs, Wells scored his first postseason touchdown, a four-yard rush against the New Orleans Saints. He ended the season with 176 carries for 793 rushing yards and seven rushing touchdowns to go along with 12 receptions for 143 receiving yards.

In the 2010 season, Wells appeared in 13 games and started two. He finished with 116 carries for 397 rushing yards and two rushing touchdowns.

For the 2011 NFL season, the Cardinals and coach Ken Whisenhunt placed a heavy emphasis on the ground-attack led by Wells. The decision was mostly influenced by the departure of Tim Hightower to the Washington Redskins, in turn giving the starting back role to Wells.

In Week 4 of the 2011 season, Wells rushed 27 times for 138 yards and three touchdowns in the 31–27 loss to the New York Giants. On November 27, 2011, in Week 12, Wells set a Cardinals single-game and personal record by rushing for 228 yards against the St. Louis Rams. Wells' performance eclipsed the team record previously held by LeShon Johnson, who rushed for 214 yards against the New Orleans Saints in 1996. Wells finished the 2011 season with his first 1,000 yard season, ending with 1,047 yards on 245 carries (a 4.3 average) and 10 touchdowns.

On September 26, 2012, Wells was placed on the injured reserve list due to a severe turf toe injury but received the new "designated to return" tag and was expected to return in practice on November 7.

On Sunday, November 25, 2012, Wells made his first appearance back from injured reserve for Arizona's game against the St. Louis Rams, scoring his first two touchdowns of the season. His relationship with management soured near the end of the season. After gaining three yards on four carries against the Chicago Bears in the penultimate game of the season, Wells declared that he would be auditioning for the other 31 teams in his last appearance. Coach Whisenhunt held Wells out of the final game. On March 11, 2013, Wells was released by the Arizona Cardinals.

On October 9, 2013, Wells tore his Achilles tendon during a workout with the Baltimore Ravens. After the injury, Wells did not sign with another NFL team.

== Career statistics ==
=== NFL ===
Year	Team	Games		Rushing					Receiving					Fumbles	
Year	Team	GP	GS	Att	Yds	Avg	Lng	TD	Rec	Yds	Avg	Lng	TD	Fum	Lost
2009	ARI	16	0	176	793	4.5	33	7	12	143	11.9	25	0	4	3
2010	ARI	13	2	116	397	3.4	24	2	5	74	14.8	43	0	1	0
2011	ARI	14	14	245	1,047	4.3	71	10	10	52	5.2	10	0	4	3
2012	ARI	8	7	88	234	2.7	31	5	1	24	24.0	24	0	1	1
Total		51	23	625	2,471	4.0	71	24	28	293	10.5	43	0	10	7

=== College ===
Freshman

Stat	Attempts	Yards	Average	TD
Rushing	104	576	5.5	7
Receiving	2	16	8.0	0

Sophomore

Stat	Number	Yards	Average	TD
Rushing	274	1,609	5.9	15
Receiving	5	21	4.2	0

Junior

Stat	Number	Yards	Average	TD
Rushing	207	1,197	5.8	8
Receiving	7	26	3.7	0

== Career highlights ==
NFL

- PFWA All-Rookie Team (2009)

College

- First-team All-Big Ten (2007)
- Second-team All-Big Ten (2008)
- Rivals.com Second-team All-American (2007)
- Team MVP (2008)

High school

- Parade All-American (2005)
- U.S. Army All-American Bowl MVP (2005)

== Personal life ==
Wells is one of eleven children. His parents are James and Paulette Wells. The nickname Beanie was given to him by his family at a young age and he has said, "when I was young, my big brother said I was skinny like a bean pole."
