= 2007 Ohio State Buckeyes football team =

American college football season

2007 Ohio State Buckeyes football

Big Ten champion

BCS National Championship Game, L 24–38 vs. LSU
- Conference: Big Ten Conference

Ranking
- Coaches: No. 4
- AP: No. 5
- Record: 11–2 (7–1 Big Ten)
- Head coach: Jim Tressel (7th season)
- Offensive coordinator: Jim Bollman (7th season)
- Offensive scheme: Multiple
- Defensive coordinator: Jim Heacock (3rd season)
- Co-defensive coordinator: Luke Fickell (3rd season)
- Base defense: 4–3
- Captains: Kirk Barton; Dionte Johnson; James Laurinaitis
- Home stadium: Ohio Stadium

2007 Big Ten Conference football standings
	Conf.			Overall
Team	W		L	W		L
No. 5 Ohio State $	7	–	1	11	–	2
No. 18 Michigan	6	–	2	9	–	4
No. 20 Illinois %	6	–	2	9	–	4
No. 24 Wisconsin	5	–	3	9	–	4
Penn State	4	–	4	9	–	4
Iowa	4	–	4	6	–	6
Purdue	3	–	5	8	–	5
Indiana	3	–	5	7	–	6
Michigan State	3	–	5	7	–	6
Northwestern	3	–	5	6	–	6
Minnesota	0	–	8	1	–	11
$ – BCS representative as conference champion; % – BCS at-large representative; Rankings from AP Poll

The 2007 Ohio State Buckeyes football team was an American football team that represented the Ohio State University as a member of the Big Ten Conference during the 2007 NCAA Division I FBS football season. In their seventh year under head coach Jim Tressel, the Buckeyes compiled an 11–2 record (7–1 in conference games), won the Big Ten championship, and outscored opponents by a total of 408 to 166. The Buckeyes did not play any opponents ranked in the top ten during the regular season, and its sole regular-season loss was to unranked Illinois. They concluded the season with a 38–24 loss to No. 2 LSU in the 2008 BCS National Championship Game. The Buckeyes were ranked No. 5 in the final AP poll.

The team's statistical leaders included quarterback Todd Boeckman (2,379 passing yards, 63.9% completion percentage), running back Beanie Wells (1,609 rushing yards, 5.9 yards per carry), wide receiver Brian Robiskie (55 receptions for 935 yards), linebacker James Laurinaitis (70 solo tackles, 121 total tackles), and kicker Ryan Pretorius (102 points). For the second year in a row, Laurinaitis was selected as a consensus first-team All-American. Six Ohio State players received first-team honors on the 2007 All-Big Ten Conference football team: Laurinaitis; Boeckman; Wells; offensive tackle Kirk Barton; defensive end Vernon Gholston; and defensive back Malcolm Jenkins.

The team played its home games in Ohio Stadium in Columbus, Ohio.

== Schedule ==
Date	Time	Opponent	Rank	Site	TV	Result	Attendance
September 1	12:00 p.m.	Youngstown State*	No. 10	Ohio Stadium; Columbus, OH	BTN	W 38–6	105,038
September 8	12:00 p.m.	Akron*	No. 11	Ohio Stadium; Columbus, OH	BTN	W 20–2	104,317
September 15	3:30 p.m.	at Washington*	No. 10	Husky Stadium; Seattle, WA	ESPN	W 33–14	74,927
September 22	3:30 p.m.	Northwestern	No. 9	Ohio Stadium; Columbus, OH	ABC/ESPN	W 58–7	105,178
September 29	8:00 p.m.	at Minnesota	No. 8	Hubert H. Humphrey Metrodome; Minneapolis, MN	ESPN2	W 30–7	51,611
October 6	8:00 p.m.	at No. 20 Purdue	No. 4	Ross–Ade Stadium; West Lafayette, IN	ABC	W 23–7	65,497
October 13	12:00 p.m.	Kent State*	No. 3	Ohio Stadium; Columbus, OH	BTN	W 48–3	105,051
October 20	3:30 p.m.	Michigan State^{†}	No. 1	Ohio Stadium; Columbus, OH	ABC	W 24–17	105,287
October 27	8:00 p.m.	at No. 25 Penn State	No. 1	Beaver Stadium; University Park, PA (rivalry, College GameDay)	ABC	W 37–17	110,134
November 3	12:00 p.m.	No. 21 Wisconsin	No. 1	Ohio Stadium; Columbus, OH	BTN	W 38–17	105,449
November 10	3:30 p.m.	Illinois	No. 1	Ohio Stadium; Columbus, OH (Illibuck)	ABC/ESPN	L 21–28	105,453
November 17	12:00 p.m.	at No. 21 Michigan	No. 7	Michigan Stadium; Ann Arbor, MI (rivalry, College GameDay)	ABC	W 14–3	111,941
January 7, 2008	8:00 p.m.	vs. No. 2 LSU*	No. 1	Louisiana Superdome; New Orleans, LA (BCS National Championship Game, College GameDay)	FOX	L 24–38	79,651
*Non-conference game; ^{†}Homecoming; Rankings from AP Poll (and BCS standings, after October 14) - Released prior to game; All times are in Eastern time

== Rankings ==
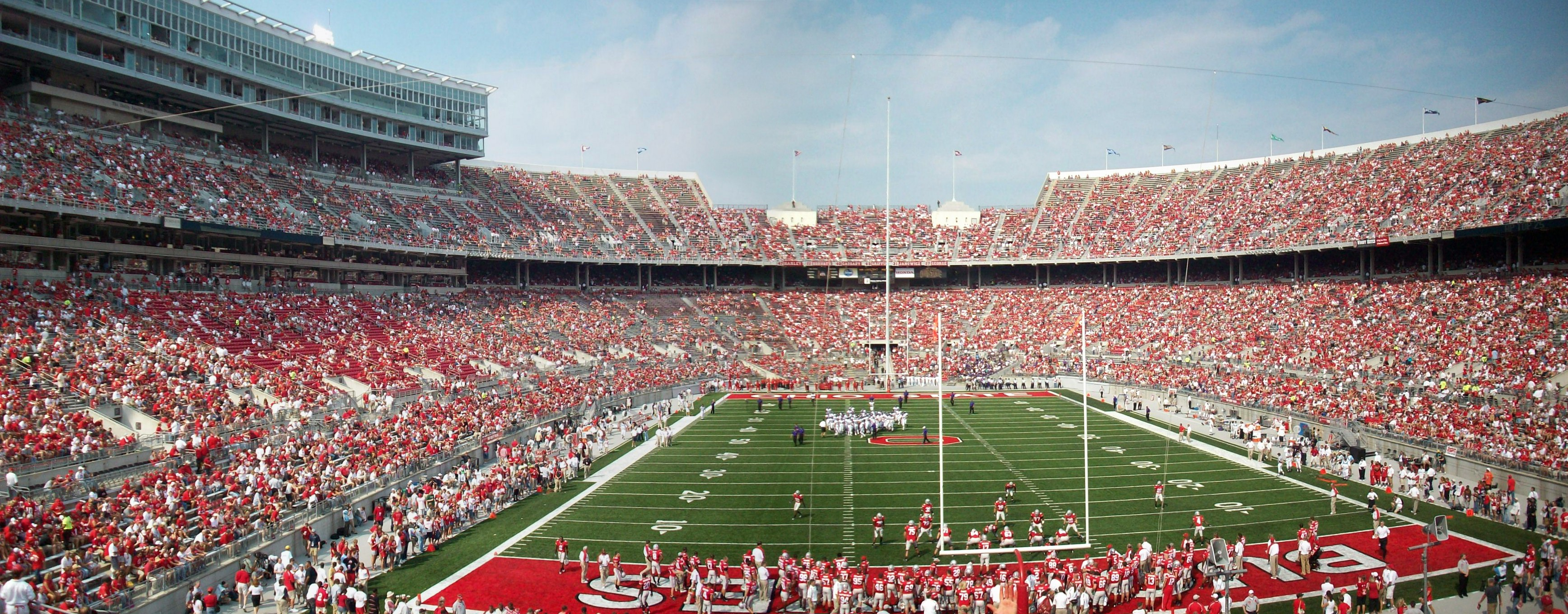
Panoramic view of the Ohio State vs. Northwestern game on September 22

Ranking movements Legend: ██ Increase in ranking ██ Decrease in ranking ( ) = First-place votes
	Week															
Poll	Pre	1	2	3	4	5	6	7	8	9	10	11	12	13	14	Final
AP	11	12	10	8	8	4	3	1 (50)	1 (57)	1 (59)	1 (60)	7	5	3	1 (50)	5
Coaches	10	11	10	9	8	4 (1)	3 (2)	1 (56)	1 (58)	1 (56)	1 (55)	7	5	3 (6)	1 (46)	4
Harris	Not released				7	4	3	1 (110)	1 (111)	1 (114)	1 (112)	7	5	3 (11)	1 (98)	Not released
BCS	Not released							1	1	1	1	7	5	3	1	Not released

== Preseason ==
On March 6, Coach Jim Tressel announced the hiring of Taver Johnson as an assistant coach in charge of cornerbacks. A native of Cincinnati, Johnson replaced Tim Beckman, who left Ohio State to become defensive coordinator at Oklahoma State University.

== Game summaries ==
=== Youngstown State ===
Youngstown State at Ohio State

Team	1	2	3	4	Total
Youngstown State	0	3	3	0	6
• No. 20 Ohio State	7	14	3	14	38

- Date: September 1
- Location: Ohio Stadium, Columbus, Ohio
- Game start: 12:00 p.m. EST
- Game attendance: 105,038
- TV announcers (BTN): Roger Twibell (Play-by-play) & Mike Tomczak (Color)

=== Akron ===
Akron at Ohio State

Team	1	2	3	4	Total
Akron	2	0	0	0	2
• No. 11 Ohio State	0	3	10	7	20

- Date: September 8
- Location: Ohio Stadium, Columbus, Ohio
- Game start: 12:00 p.m. EST
- Game attendance: 104,317
- TV announcers (BTN): Thom Brennaman (Play-by-play), Charles Davis (Color) & Charissa Thompson (Sideline)

=== Washington ===
Ohio State at Washington

Team	1	2	3	4	Total
• No. 10 Ohio State	0	3	14	16	33
Washington	0	7	0	7	14

- Date: September 15
- Location: Husky Stadium, Seattle
- Game start: 3:30 p.m. EST
- Game attendance: 74,927
- TV announcers (ESPN): Ron Franklin (Play-by-play), Ed Cunningham (Color) & Jack Arute (Sideline)

Scoring summary
2	13:48	OSU	Ryan Pretorius 28-yard field goal	OSU 3–0
2	0:03	WASH	Anthony Russo 23-yard pass from Jake Locker (Ryan Perkins kick)	WASH 7–3
3	9:36	OSU	Brian Robiskie 68-yard pass from Todd Boeckman (Ryan Pretorius kick)	OSU 10–7
3	8:57	OSU	Chris Wells 14-yard run (Ryan Pretorius kick)	OSU 17–7
4	14:05	OSU	Ryan Pretorius 23-yard field goal	OSU 20–7
4	3:30	OSU	Brian Hartline 36-yard pass from Todd Boeckman (Ryan Pretorius kick)	OSU 27–7
4	00:58	WASH	Louis Rankin 2-yard run (Ryan Perkins kick)	OSU 27–14
4	0:00	OSU	Brandon Saine 37-yard run (no kick)	OSU 33–14

=== Northwestern ===
Northwestern at Ohio State

Team	1	2	3	4	Total
Northwestern	0	0	7	0	7
• No. 9 Ohio State	28	17	13	0	58

- Date: September 22
- Location: Ohio Stadium, Columbus, Ohio
- Game start: 3:30 p.m. EST
- Game attendance: 105,178
- TV announcers (ABC/ESPN): Ron Franklin (Play-by-play), Ed Cunningham (Color) & Jack Arute (Sideline)

=== Minnesota ===
Ohio State at Minnesota

Team	1	2	3	4	Total
• No. 8 Ohio State	14	6	3	7	30
Minnesota	0	7	0	0	7

- Date: September 29
- Location: Hubert H. Humphrey Metrodome, Minneapolis
- Game start: 8:00 p.m. EST
- Game attendance: 51,611
- Game weather: Indoors
- TV announcers (ESPN2): Mark Jones (Play-by-play), Bob Davie (Color) & Stacey Dales (Sideline)

=== Purdue ===
#4 Ohio State Buckeyes (5–0) at #23 Purdue Boilermakers (5–0)

Quarter	1	2	3	4	Total
Ohio St	14	3	3	3	23
Purdue	0	0	0	7	7

at Ross–Ade Stadium • West Lafayette, Indiana

- Date: October 6
- Game time: 8:00 p.m. EDT
- Game weather: Clear • 84 °F (29 °C) • Wind S/SW 3 miles per hour (4.8 km/h; 2.6 kn)
- Game attendance: 65,497
- Referee: Steve Pamon
- TV announcers (ABC): Brent Musburger, Kirk Herbstreit, and Lisa Salters
- Ohio State Football Archives

Game information

Ohio St

- Todd Boeckman
  17/29, 200 Yds, 2 TD, 3 INT
- Chris Wells
  18 Rush, 85 Yds
- Ray Small
  6 Rec, 70 Yds, TD

Purdue

- Curtis Painter
  31/60, 268 Yds, TD
- Kory Sheets
  7 Rush, 20 Yds
- Dustin Keller
  7 Rec, 101 Yds

Scoring summary

Quarter	Time	Drive			Team	Scoring information	Score	
Quarter	Time	Plays	Yards	TOP	Team	Scoring information	OSU	PUR
1	8:04	9	87	3:23	Ohio St	Ray Small 26-yard touchdown reception from Todd Boeckman, Ryan Pretorius kick good	7	0
1	4:48	5	43	2:18	Ohio St	Brian Hartline 6-yard touchdown reception from Todd Boeckman, Ryan Pretorius kick good	14	0
2	10:21	8	34	4:25	Ohio St	44-yard field goal by Ryan Pretorius	17	0
3	7:43	4	7	0:53	Ohio St	39-yard field goal by Ryan Pretorius	20	0
4	14:56	6	56	2:47	Ohio St	23-yard field goal by Ryan Pretorius	23	0
4	0:10	13	88	2:46	Purdue	Jeff Lindsay 1-yard touchdown reception from Curtis Painter, Chris Summers kick good	23	7
"TOP" = time of possession. For other American football terms, see Glossary of American football.							23	7

=== Kent State ===
Kent State at Ohio State

Team	1	2	3	4	Total
Kent State	0	0	0	3	3
• No. 3 Ohio State	7	28	10	3	48

- Date: October 13
- Location: Ohio Stadium, Columbus, Ohio
- Game start: 12:00 p.m. EST
- Game attendance: 105,051
- TV announcers (BTN): Mark Neely (Play-by-play), Glen Mason (Color) & Marshall Harris (Sideline)

=== Michigan State ===
Michigan State at Ohio State

Team	1	2	3	4	Total
Michigan State	0	0	14	3	17
• No. 1 Ohio State	10	7	7	0	24

- Date: October 20
- Location: Ohio Stadium, Columbus, Ohio
- Game start: 3:30 p.m. EST
- Game attendance: 105,287
- TV announcers (ABC): Brad Nessler (Play-by-play), Bob Griese (Color), Paul Maguire (Color) & Erin Andrews (Sideline)

=== Penn State ===
Ohio State at Penn State

Team	1	2	3	4	Total
• No. 1 Ohio State	10	7	7	13	37
No. 25 Penn State	7	0	3	7	17

- Date: October 27
- Location: Beaver Stadium, University Park, Pennsylvania
- Game start: 8:00 p.m. EST
- Game attendance: 110,134
- TV announcers (ABC): Brent Musburger (Play-by-play), Kirk Herbstreit (Color) & Lisa Salters (Sideline)

Scoring summary
Q1	12:16	OSU	Ryan Pretorius 50 yard field goal	OSU 3–0
Q1	8:25	PSU	Rodney Kinlaw 2 yard run (Kevin Kelly kick)	PSU 7–3
Q1	4:59	OSU	Brian Robiskie 9 yard pass from Todd Boeckman (Ryan Pretorius kick)	OSU 10–7
Q2	9:53	OSU	Brian Hartline 16 yard pass from Todd Boeckman (Ryan Pretorius kick)	OSU 17–7
Q3	6:10	OSU	Jake Ballard 15 yard pass from Todd Boeckman (Ryan Pretorius kick)	OSU 24–7
Q3	1:27	PSU	Kevin Kelly 27 yard field goal	OSU 24–10
Q4	9:52	OSU	Ryan Pretorius 37 yard field goal	OSU 27–10
Q4	9:36	OSU	Malcolm Jenkins 24 yard interception return (Ryan Pretorius kick)	OSU 34–10
Q4	3:30	OSU	Ryan Pretorius 35 yard field goal	OHST 37–10
Q4	3:16	PSU	A.J. Wallace 97 yard kickoff return (Kevin Kelly kick)	OSU 37–17

=== Wisconsin ===
Wisconsin at Ohio State

Team	1	2	3	4	Total
No. 19 Wisconsin	3	0	14	0	17
• No. 1 Ohio State	7	3	7	21	38

- Date: November 3
- Location: Ohio Stadium, Columbus, Ohio
- Game start: 12:00 p.m. EST
- Game attendance: 105,449
- TV announcers (BTN): Thom Brennaman (Play-by-play), Charles Davis (Color) & Charissa Thompson (Sideline)

Scoring summary
1	12:15	OSU	Brian Robiskie 30-yard pass from Todd Boeckman (Ryan Pretorius kick)	OSU 7–0
1	4:49	WIS	Tyler Mehlhaff 21-yard field goal	OSU 7–3
2	0:06	OSU	Ryan Pretorius 27-yard field goal	OSU 10–3
3	12:37	Wisconsin	Travis Beckum 28-yard pass from Tyler Donovan (Tyler Mehlhaff kick)	Tie 10–10
3	6:53	WIS	Chris Pressley 2-yard pass from Tyler Donovan (Tyler Mehlhaff kick)	WIS 17–10
3	2:41	OSU	Chris Wells 31-yard run (Ryan Pretorius kick)	Tie 17–17
4	14:18	OSU	Chris Wells 30-yard run (Ryan Pretorius kick)	OSU 24–17
4	10:05	OSU	Brian Robiskie 8-yard pass from Todd Boeckman (Ryan Pretorius kick)	OSU 31–17
4	3:16	OSU	Chris Wells 23-yard run (Ryan Pretorius kick)	OSU 38–17

Ohio State sets record with 20th straight Big Ten win.

=== Illinois ===
Illinois at Ohio State

Team	1	2	3	4	Total
• Illinois	14	7	7	0	28
No. 1 Ohio State	14	0	7	0	21

- Date: November 10
- Location: Ohio Stadium, Columbus, Ohio
- Game start: 3:30 p.m. EST
- Game attendance: 105,453
- TV announcers (ABC/ESPN): Brad Nessler (Play-by-play), Bob Griese (Color), Paul Maguire (Color) & Bonnie Bernstein (Sideline)

=== Michigan ===
Ohio State at Michigan

Team	1	2	3	4	Total
• No. 7 Ohio State	0	7	7	0	14
No. 23 Michigan	3	0	0	0	3

- Date: November 17
- Location: Michigan Stadium, Ann Arbor, Michigan
- Game start: 12:00 p.m. EST
- Game attendance: 111,941
- Referee: John O'Neill
- TV announcers (ABC): Brent Musburger (Play-by-play), Kirk Herbstreit (Color) & Lisa Salters (Sideline)

Scoring summary
1	1:37	MICH	K.C. Lopata 33-yard field goal	MICH 3–0
2	10:08	OSU	Chris Wells 1-yard run (Ryan Pretorius kick)	OSU 7–3
2	13:40	OSU	Chris Wells 62-yard run (Ryan Pretorius kick)	OSU 14–3

=== National Championship Game ===
LSU vs. Ohio State

Team	1	2	3	4	Total
• No. 2 LSU	3	21	7	7	38
No. 1 Ohio State	10	0	7	7	24

- Date: January 7
- Location: Louisiana Superdome, New Orleans
- Game start: 8:00 p.m. EST
- Game attendance: 79,651
- Game weather: indoors (dome)
- TV announcers (FOX): Thom Brennaman (Play-by-play), Charles Davis (Color) & Chris Myers (Sideline)

On January 7, 2008 the Buckeyes played at the BCS National Championship game in New Orleans, Louisiana in the Louisiana Superdome. This was the first time in the school's history that the football team had played back to back National Championship games. The Buckeyes ended up losing the game to the Louisiana State University Tigers, 38–24. After a strong initial start (a 10–0 run in the first quarter in favor of the Buckeyes), the LSU Tigers went on one of their own, 31–0, from the first to third quarters. Two key pivotal special teams plays contributed to the LSU run, one being a blocked 38 yard Ryan Pretorius (Ohio State) field goal in the first quarter, and a roughing the kicker penalty committed by Austin Spitler (Ohio State) on a punt that extended an LSU touchdown drive in the third. Both teams scored 14 points in the second half which lead to a Tigers' victory due to the 2nd quarter LSU scoring deficit.

== Personnel ==
=== Coaching staff ===
- Jim Tressel – head coach (7th year)
- Jim Bollman – offensive line/offensive coordinator (7th year)
- Joe Daniels – quarterbacks (7th year)
- Luke Fickell – co-defensive coordinator / linebackers coach (6th year)
- Jim Heacock – defensive coordinator / defensive line (12th year)
- Paul Haynes – safeties (3rd year)
- Darrell Hazell – assistant head coach / wide receivers (4th year)
- Taver Johnson – cornerbacks (1st year)
- John Peterson – tight ends / recruiting coordinator (4th year)
- Dick Tressel – running backs (7th year)
- Bob Tucker – director of football operations (13th year)
- Stan Jefferson – director of player development (4th year)
- Eric Lichter – director of football performance (2nd year)
- Butch Reynolds – speed coordinator (3rd year)
- Jeff Uhlenhake – strength coordinator (1st year)

=== Roster ===
Wide receivers: 5 Dukes, Albert – Junior; 9 Hartline, Brian – Sophomore; 89 Hummel, Garrett – Freshman; Jordan, Devin – Senior; 18 Sharp, Luke – Junior; 18 Lyons, Devon – Junior; 86 Potokar, Dan – Sophomore; 80 Robiskie, Brian – Junior; 15 Ruhl, Kyle – Junior; 12 Sanzenbacher, Dane – Freshman; 4 Small, Ray – Sophomore; 81 Ullery, Brent – Senior; 19 Washington, Taurian – Freshman; Offensive tackles: 74 Barton, Kirk – Senior; 75 Boone, Alex – Junior; 65 Ebner, Doug – Junior; 66 Moses, Andrew – Sophomore; 77 Smith, Connor – Freshman; 76 Sika, Scott – Sophomore; 69 Slagle, Zach – Freshman; Offensive guards: 68 Blankenship, Evan – Freshman; 70 Browning, Bryant – Freshman; 78 Dye, Daniel – Senior; 67 Mitchum, Kyle – Junior; 63 Person, Ben – Junior; 71 Rehring, Steve – Sophomore; 79 Skinner, Jon – Junior; Centers: 64 Cordle, Jim – Sophomore; 57 Malone, Chris – Sophomore; Tight end: 86 Ballard, Jake – Sophomore; 46 Larson, J.D – Sophomore; 82 Miller, Andy – Freshman; 88 Nicol, Rory – Junior; 87 Smith, Brandon – Junior; Quarterback: 17 Boeckman, Todd – Junior; 14 Bauserman, Joe – Freshman; 7 Henton, Antonio – Freshman; 13 Kacsandi, Ben – Junior; 11 Schoenhoft, Rob – Sophomore	Running back: 46 Christian, K.C. – Freshman; 35 DeLande, Bo – Freshman; 33 Gantz, Joe – Sophomore; 2 Herron, Daniel – Freshman; 16 Robinson, Trever – Senior; 3 Saine, Brandon – Freshman; 28 Wells, Chris – Sophomore; 34 Wells, Maurice – Junior; 24 Williams, Marcus – Freshman; Fullback: 49 Johnson, Dionte – Senior; 43 Olson, Aram – Freshman; 48 Smith, Spencer – Freshman; 42 Whaley, Tyler – Senior; Defensive lineman: 92 Daly, Brett – Senior; 92 Denlinger, Todd – Sophomore; 50 Gholston, Vernon – Junior; 90 Gray, Bryan – Sophomore; 95 Rietschlin, Chris – Junior; Defensive tackles: 93 Abdallah, Nader – Junior; 97 Heyward, Cameron – Freshman; 72 Larimore, Dexter – Freshman; Defensive end: 78 Barrow, Alex – Junior; 57 Ingham, Tom – Sophomore; 9 Rose, Robert – Freshman; 98 Thomas, Solomon – Freshman; 87 Wilson, Lawrence – Junior; 84 Worthington, Doug – Sophomore; Cornerbacks: 13 Amos, Andre – Sophomore; 4 Coleman, Kurt – Sophomore; 2 Jenkins, Malcolm – Junior; 29 Lane, Shaun – Junior; Defensive backs: 5 Chekwa, Chimdi – Freshman; 32 Clifford, Eugene – Freshman; 36 Daniels, Matt – Junior; 39 Dougherty, Michael – Junior; 30 Evege, Donnie – Freshman; 41 Haslam, De'Angelo – Senior; 2 Jenkins, Malcolm – Junior; 24 Schwartz, Grant – Freshman; 11 Scott, James – Freshman; 20 Washington, Donald – Sophomore; 17 Willis, Zach – Junior	Linebackers: 1 Freeman, Marcus – Senior; 37 Gibson, Thaddeus – Freshman; 6 Grant, Larry – Senior; 7 Hines, Jermale – Freshman; 51 Homan, Ross – Sophomore; 44 Johnson, Mark – Freshman; 33 Laurinaitis, James – Junior; 59 Libby, Kyle – Freshman; 49 Lukens, Ryan – Junior; 26 Moeller, Tyler – Freshman; 36 Rolle, Brian – Freshman; 38 Spitler, Austin – Sophomore; 55 Terry, Curtis – Senior; Safety: 8 Gant, Aaron So.; 3 O'Neal, Jamario Jr.; 14 Oliver, Nate Fr.; 23 Patterson, Nick Jr.; 25 Pentello, Rocco Fr.; 21 Russell, Anderson So.; 10 Torrence, Devon Fr.; Long snappers: 52 Curtis, Don – Freshman; 61 Haas, Jackson – Senior; 53 Howe, Patrick – Freshman; 56 Makridis, Dimitrios – Senior; 96 McQuaide, Jake – Freshman; Kickers: 12 Barclay, Devin – Freshman; 39 Good, Andrew Jr.; 41 Mattimoe, Matt – Sophomore; 20 Pettrey, Aaron – Sophomore; 85 Pretorius, Ryan Jr.; Punters: 15 Trapasso, A.J. – Junior; 48 Thoma, John – Sophomore; 24 Wuokko, Kyle - Sophomore; 94 Bartholomew, Benjamin – Freshman

== 2008 NFL draftees ==
Player	Round	Pick	Position	NFL club
Vernon Gholston	1	6	Defensive end	New York Jets
Larry Grant	7	214	Linebacker	San Francisco 49ers
Kirk Barton	7	247	Tackle	Chicago Bears
