= 2008 Ohio State Buckeyes football team =

American college football season

2008 Ohio State Buckeyes football

Big Ten co-champion

Fiesta Bowl, L 21–24 vs. Texas
- Conference: Big Ten Conference

Ranking
- Coaches: No. 10
- AP: No. 9
- Record: 10–3 (7–1 Big Ten)
- Head coach: Jim Tressel (8th season)
- Offensive coordinator: Jim Bollman (8th season)
- Offensive scheme: Multiple
- Defensive coordinator: Jim Heacock (4th season)
- Co-defensive coordinator: Luke Fickell (4th season)
- Base defense: 4–3
- Captain: 4: James Laurinaitis 2 Time Captain; Malcolm Jenkins; Todd Boeckman; Brian Robiskie
- Home stadium: Ohio Stadium

2008 Big Ten Conference football standings
	Conf.			Overall
Team	W		L	W		L
No. 8 Penn State $+	7	–	1	11	–	2
No. 9 Ohio State %+	7	–	1	10	–	3
No. 24 Michigan State	6	–	2	9	–	4
Northwestern	5	–	3	9	–	4
No. 20 Iowa	5	–	3	9	–	4
Wisconsin	3	–	5	7	–	6
Minnesota	3	–	5	7	–	6
Illinois	3	–	5	5	–	7
Purdue	2	–	6	4	–	8
Michigan	2	–	6	3	–	9
Indiana	1	–	7	3	–	9
$ – BCS representative as conference champion; % – BCS at-large representative; + – Conference co-champions; Rankings from AP Poll

The 2008 Ohio State Buckeyes football team represented Ohio State University during the 2008 NCAA Division I FBS football season. The Buckeyes were coached by Jim Tressel and played their home games in Ohio Stadium in Columbus, Ohio. They finished with a record of 10–3 (7–1 Big Ten) and were Big Ten Conference co-champions.

== Before the season ==
The Buckeyes lost 2007 starters RT Kirk Barton, FB Dionte Johnson and LB Larry Grant to graduation.

Junior DE Vernon Gholston declared for the 2008 NFL draft.

Number 1 high school recruit Terrelle Pryor officially signed with the team.

Sophomore backup quarterbacks Rob Schoenhoft and Antonio Henton transferred to the University of Delaware and Georgia Southern University respectively.

Offensive lineman Justin Boren transferred to Ohio State University from the University of Michigan.

In July, defensive back Eugene Clifford was dismissed from the team and transferred to Tennessee State University. Clifford was also suspended for the 2008 BCS National Championship Game.

== Schedule ==
Date	Time	Opponent	Rank	Site	TV	Result	Attendance
August 30	12:00 p.m.	Youngstown State*	No. 2	Ohio Stadium; Columbus, OH	BTN	W 43–0	105,011
September 6	12:00 p.m.	Ohio*	No. 3	Ohio Stadium; Columbus, OH	ESPN	W 26–14	105,002
September 13	8:00 p.m.	at No. 1 USC*	No. 5	Los Angeles Memorial Coliseum; Los Angeles, CA (College GameDay)	ABC	L 3–35	93,607
September 20	12:00 p.m.	Troy*	No. 13	Ohio Stadium; Columbus, OH	BTN	W 28–10	102,989
September 27	12:00 p.m.	Minnesota	No. 14	Ohio Stadium; Columbus, OH	BTN	W 34–21	105,175
October 4	8:00 p.m.	at No. 18 Wisconsin	No. 14	Camp Randall Stadium; Madison, WI	ABC	W 20–17	81,608
October 11	3:30 p.m.	Purdue	No. 12	Ohio Stadium; Columbus, OH	ABC/ESPN	W 16–3	105,378
October 18	3:30 p.m.	at No. 20 Michigan State	No. 12	Spartan Stadium; East Lansing, MI	ABC/ESPN2	W 45–7	77,360
October 25	8:00 p.m.	No. 3 Penn State^{†}	No. 10	Ohio Stadium; Columbus, OH (rivalry, College GameDay)	ABC	L 6–13	105,711
November 8	12:00 p.m.	at Northwestern	No. 12	Ryan Field; Evanston, IL	ESPN2	W 45–10	47,130
November 15	12:00 p.m.	at Illinois	No. 10	Memorial Stadium; Champaign, IL (Illibuck)	ESPN	W 30–20	62,870
November 22	12:00 p.m.	Michigan	No. 10	Ohio Stadium; Columbus, OH (rivalry)	ABC	W 42–7	105,546
January 5, 2009	8:00 p.m.	vs. No. 3 Texas*	No. 10	University of Phoenix Stadium; Glendale, AZ (Fiesta Bowl)	FOX	L 21–24	72,047
*Non-conference game; ^{†}Homecoming; Rankings from AP Poll released prior to the game; All times are in Eastern time

== Game summaries ==
=== Vs. Youngstown State ===
at Ohio Stadium, Columbus, Ohio

	1	2	3	4	Total
Penguins	0	0	0	0	0
#3 Buckeyes	13	13	7	10	43

The Buckeyes began the season against Jim Tressel's former team for the second straight year. Going into the game, Tressel planned to play all three quarterbacks within the first half. Top recruit Terrelle Pryor led the Buckeyes to a field goal on his first drive. Pryor also rushed for a touchdown in the second half. However, the 43–0 victory was marred when star running back Chris Wells left the game in the third quarter with a toe injury.

==== Scoring summary ====
1st Quarter

- 12:06 OSU Wells 43-yard run (Pretorius kick) 7–0 OSU
- 7:54 OSU Pretorius 28-yard field goal 10–0 OSU
- 0:08 OSU Pretorius 31-yard field goal 13–0 OSU

2nd Quarter

- 12:51 OSU Pretorius 26-yard field goal 16–0 OSU
- 5:17 OSU Pretorius 50-yard field goal 19–0 OSU
- 1:16 OSU Robiskie 31-yard pass from Boeckman (Pretorius kick) 26–0 OSU

3rd Quarter

- 2:01 OSU Posey 25-yard pass from Boeckman (Pretorius kick) 33–0 OSU

4th Quarter

- 12:48 OSU Pryor 18-yard run (Pretorius kick) 40–0 OSU
- 5:08 OSU Pettrey 54-yard field goal 43–0 OSU

=== Vs. Ohio ===
at Ohio Stadium, Columbus, Ohio

	1	2	3	4	Total
Bobcats	0	7	7	0	14
#3 Buckeyes	3	3	6	14	26

With Chris Wells watching from the sideline with a foot injury, the Buckeyes struggled to move the ball in the first half against the lightly regarded Ohio. The Buckeyes scored first with a 3–0 lead but finished the first half down 7–6. Six minutes into the 3rd quarter quarterback Todd Boeckman fumbled a snap in the Buckeyes end zone which was recovered by Ohio for a touchdown to increase their lead to 14–6. The Buckeyes quickly responded with a Dan Herron 1-yd TD with 2:51 left in the 3rd capped by a missed point-after kick. The Bobcats then began to falter. Parson fumbled a punt, with Ohio State's Shaun Lane falling on the ball as it tumbled out of bounds at the Ohio 25. The recovery was confirmed on video review. Ohio State then capped their 6-play drive with a 2-yd TD run by Brandon Saine to take the 19–14 lead. With around 6 minutes left to play, Ray Small returned an Ohio punt 69 yards for a touchdown which sealed the sluggish win for the Buckeyes.

==== Scoring summary ====
1st Quarter

- 5:00 OSU Pretorius 27-yard field goal 3–0 OSU

2nd Quarter

- 6:56 OHIO Harden 15-yard run (Way kick) 7–3 OHIO
- 5:02 OSU Pretorius 38-yard field goal 7–6 OHIO

3rd Quarter

- 9:00 OHIO Meyers recovered fumble in end zone (Way kick) 14–6 OHIO
- 2:51 OSU Herron 1-yard run 14–12 OHIO

4th Quarter

- 14:00 OSU Saine 2-yard run (Pretorius kick) 19–14 OSU
- 5:57 OSU Small 69-yard punt return (Pretorius kick) 26–14 OSU

=== At USC ===
at Los Angeles Memorial Coliseum, Los Angeles, California

	1	2	3	4	Total
#5 Buckeyes	3	0	0	0	3
#1 Trojans	7	14	14	0	35

This game between two perennial powers had long been identified as a major non-conference game with potential championship implications for either program. In the preseason it was named as the most anticipated regular-season game of 2008.

By the end of the 2007–08 season, the non-conference game between the Buckeyes and Trojans garnered interest as a possible early-season battle between top-10 teams. USC or Ohio State had played in five of the last six BCS title games. The teams have not faced one another since September 29, 1990, when Todd Marinovich led the Trojans to a 35–26 victory in Ohio Stadium in a game that was called because of a thunderstorm with 2 minutes 36 seconds to play. In naming it the top potentially season-defining game of 2008, Sports Illustrated highlighted a theme of credibility: Ohio State enters the game trying to move past the BCS title game losses of the previous two seasons and USC enters trying to show it remains highly competitive with its new starting quarterback and four of five new players on the offensive line.

==== Scoring summary ====
1st Quarter

- 3:06 OSU Pretorius 29-yard field goal 3–0 OSU
- 0:33 USC Havili 35-yard pass from Sanchez (Buehler kick) 7–3 USC

2nd Quarter

- 11:00 USC Ayles 1-yard pass from Sanchez (Buehler kick) 14–3 USC
- 2:49 USC Maualuga 48-yard interception return (Buehler kick) 21–3 USC

3rd Quarter

- 6:02 USC Williams 24-yard pass from Sanchez (Buehler kick) 28–3 USC
- 1:33 USC Williams 17-yard pass from Sanchez (Buehler kick) 35–3 USC

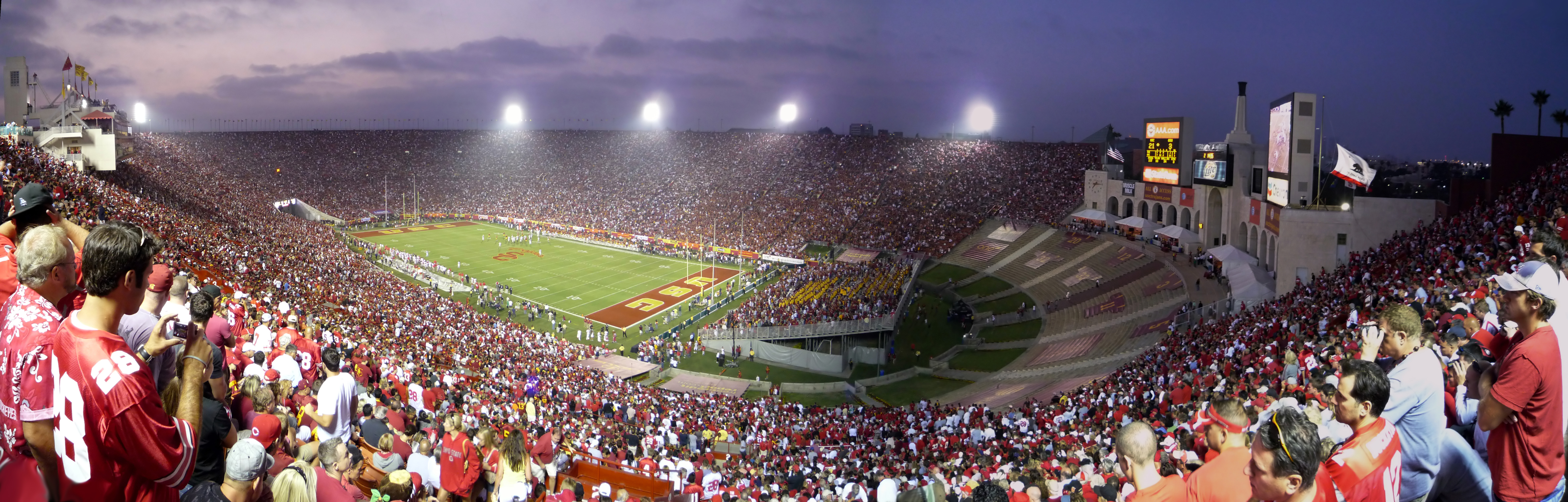
Ohio State at USC

=== Vs. Troy ===
at Ohio Stadium, Columbus, Ohio

	1	2	3	4	Total
Trojans	0	10	0	0	10
#14 Buckeyes	7	7	0	14	28

==== Scoring summary ====
1st Quarter

- 10:14 OSU Nicol 13-yard pass from Pryor (Pretorius kick) 7–0 OSU

2nd Quarter

- 13:35 TROY Glusman 22-yard field goal 7–3 OSU
- 9:08 OSU Hartline 39-yard pass from Pryor (Pretorius kick) 14–3 OSU
- 1:49 TROY Jernigan 45-yard pass from Hampton (Glusman kick) 14–10 OSU

4th Quarter

- 13:28 OSU Robiskie 38-yard pass from Pryor (Pretorius kick) 21–10 OSU
- 4:46 OSU Hartline 16-yard pass from Pryor (Pretorius kick) 28–10 OSU

=== Vs. Minnesota ===
at Ohio Stadium, Columbus, Ohio

	1	2	3	4	Total
Golden Gophers	3	0	3	15	21
#13 Buckeyes	7	13	7	7	34

==== Scoring summary ====
1st Quarter

- 12:47 OSU Pryor 33-yard run (Pretorius kick) 7–0 OSU
- 7:01 MINN Monroe 33-yard field goal 7–3 OSU

2nd Quarter

- 9:45 OSU Pretorius 22-yard field goal 10–3 OSU
- 4:10 OSU Pretorius 44-yard field goal 13–3 OSU
- 0:33 OSU Robiskie 8-yard pass from Pryor (Pretorius kick) 20–3 OSU

3rd Quarter

- 10:40 MINN Monroe 28-yard field goal 20–6 OSU
- 7:37 OSU Pryor 1-yard run (Pretorius kick) 27–6 OSU

4th Quarter

- 14:55 OSU Robiskie 31-yard pass from Boeckman (Pretorius kick) 34–6 OSU
- 8:24 MINN Spry 3-yard run (Monroe kick) 34–13 OSU
- 1:13 MINN McKnight 22-yard pass from Weber (Decker pass from Maciejowski) 34–21 OSU

=== At Wisconsin ===
at Camp Randall Stadium, Madison, Wisconsin

	1	2	3	4	Total
#12 Buckeyes	7	0	3	10	20
#17 Badgers	0	10	0	7	17

This game was seen by many as the toughest conference game on the Buckeyes' schedule. With a healthy Chris Wells, the Buckeyes would start the game out strong, with a touchdown on the opening drive. Momentum would begin to turn in the second quarter as the Badgers would intercept a long pass from Terrelle Pryor. The game went into halftime with the Buckeyes trailing 10–7.

Late in the fourth quarter, down 17–13, Terrelle Pryor orchestrated a late drive and would rush in the game-winning touchdown with 1:08 left. In a last chance for the Badgers, the Buckeyes intercepted a pass to seal a 20–17 win. The game was unusual for the Wisconsin fans as the Wisconsin Marching Band was suspended for the game due to accusations of alcohol abuse, hazing and sexual misconduct. The crowd had to rely on music played over the loud speakers.

==== Scoring summary ====
1st Quarter

- 11:49 OSU Wells 33-yard run (Pretorius kick) 7–0 OSU

2nd Quarter

- 4:35 WISC Turner 9-yard pass from Evridge (Welch kick) 7–7
- 0:01 WISC Welch 20-yard field goal 10–7 WISC

3rd Quarter

- 7:43 OSU Pretorius 21-yard field goal 10–10

4th Quarter

- 10:52 OSU Pretorius 34-yard field goal 13–10 OSU
- 6:31 WISC Hill 2-yard run (Welch kick) 17–13 WISC
- 1:08 OSU Pryor 11-yard run (Pretorius kick) 20–17 OSU

=== Vs. Purdue ===
at Ohio Stadium, Columbus, Ohio

	1	2	3	4	Total
Boilermakers	0	0	3	0	3
#11 Buckeyes	10	3	0	3	16

==== Scoring summary ====
1st Quarter

- 11:41 OSU Sabino 20-yard return of blocked punt (Pretorius kick) 7–0 OSU
- 0:57 OSU Pretorius 24-yard field goal 10–0 OSU

2nd Quarter

- 4:54 OSU Pettrey 49-yard field goal 13–0 OSU

3rd Quarter

- 11:03 PUR Wiggs 53-yard field goal 13–3 OSU

4th Quarter

- 14:30 OSU Pretorius 22-yard field goal 16–3 OSU

=== At Michigan State ===
at Spartan Stadium, East Lansing, Michigan

	1	2	3	4	Total
#12 Buckeyes	21	7	0	17	45
#20 Spartans	0	0	7	0	7

==== Scoring summary ====
1st Quarter

- 8:25 OSU Pryor 18-yard run (Pretorius kick) 7–0 OSU
- 4:33 OSU Robiskie 7-yard pass from Pryor (Pretorius kick) 14–0 OSU
- 2:44 OSU Wells 1-yard run (Pretorius kick) 21–0 OSU

2nd Quarter

- 6:34 OSU Wells 12-yard run (Pretorius kick) 28–0 OSU

3rd Quarter

- 10:51 MSU Gantt 3-yard pass from Cousins (Swenson kick) 28–7 OSU

4th Quarter

- 14:41 OSU Gibson 69-yard fumble return (Pretorius kick) 35–7 OSU
- 5:27 OSU Pettrey 40-yard field goal 38–7 OSU
- 0:15 OSU Hines 48-yard fumble return (Pettrey kick) 45–7 OSU

=== Vs. Penn State ===
at Ohio Stadium, Columbus, Ohio

	1	2	3	4	Total
#3 Nittany Lions	0	3	0	10	13
#10 Buckeyes	0	3	3	0	6

For the fourth straight year, ESPN's College GameDay crew broadcast from the site of the Penn State–Ohio State match-up.

In front of an Ohio Stadium-record crowd of 105,711, the Nittany Lions got their first win at Ohio State since 1978 by defeating the Buckeyes 13–6 in a game where both offenses were held below their season averages. The turning point of the game occurred early in the fourth quarter with the Buckeyes holding a three-point lead and facing a third-and-1. Penn State safety Mark Rubin tackled Terrelle Pryor, and forced a fumble which was recovered by Penn State. Nittany Lions' backup quarterback Pat Devlin, playing for injured starter Daryll Clark, scored on a quarterback sneak for the only touchdown of the game. After PSU placekicker Kevin Kelly's second field goal, the Buckeyes last drive was ended by an interception at the goal line—Pryor's second turnover of the game. The Buckeyes were limited to their lowest point total in Ohio Stadium since 1982, and the Nittany Lions were charged with zero penalties.

Clark completed 12 of 20 passes for 121 yards before leaving, while the Nittany Lions defense held the Buckeyes running game in check, holding Pryor to six yards on nine attempts, and Beanie Wells to 55 yards on 22 carries. The Buckeyes were the only team in 2008 to hold the Lions below 20 points, and the only team to prevent Penn State from scoring a touchdown in the first half.

==== Scoring summary ====
2nd Quarter

- 1:33 PSU Kelly 31-yard field goal 3–0 PSU
- 0:00 OSU Pettrey 41-yard field goal 3–3

3rd Quarter

- 3:19 OSU Pettrey 36-yard field goal 6–3 OSU

4th Quarter

- 6:25 PSU Devlin 1-yard run (Kelly kick) 10–6 PSU
- 1:07 PSU Kelly 35-yard field goal 13–6 PSU

=== At Northwestern ===
at Ryan Field, Evanston, Illinois

	1	2	3	4	Total
#12 Buckeyes	7	17	7	14	45
#24 Wildcats	7	0	3	0	10

==== Scoring summary ====
1st Quarter

- 10:48 OSU - Wells 2-yard run (Pretorius kick) 7–0 OSU
- 4:43 NW - Kafka 1-yard run (Villarreal kick) 7–7

2nd Quarter

- 14:03 OSU - Wells 55-yard run (Pretorius kick) 14–7 OSU
- 10:04 OSU - Pretorius 33-yard field goal 17–7 OSU
- 1:26 OSU - Robiskie 15-yard pass from Pryor (Pretorius kick) 24–7 OSU

3rd Quarter

- 11:03 NW - Villarreal 25-yard field goal 24–10 OSU
- 0:34 OSU - Nicol 6-yard pass from Pryor (Pretorius kick) 31–10 OSU

4th Quarter

- 7:36 OSU - Robiskie 34-yard pass from Pryor (Pretorius kick) 38–10 OSU
- 0:07 OSU - Herron 16-yard run (Pretorius kick) 45–10 OSU

=== At Illinois ===
at Memorial Stadium, Champaign, Illinois

	1	2	3	4	Total
#10 Buckeyes	9	14	0	7	30
Fighting Illini	7	6	0	7	20

==== Scoring summary ====
1st Quarter

- 8:48 OSU - Pryor 1-yard run (Pretorius kick) 7–0 OSU
- 5:30 ILL - Cumberland 7-yard pass from Williams (Eller kick) 7–7
- 1:10 OSU - Jenkins blocked punt through end zone 9–7 OSU

2nd Quarter

- 14:15 OSU - Wells 3-yard run (Pretorius kick) 16–7 OSU
- 6:30 OSU - Sanzenbacher 20-yard pass from Pryor (Pretorius kick) 23–7 OSU
- 2:39 ILL - Eller 28-yard field goal 23–10 OSU
- 0:00 ILL - Eller 44-yard field goal 23–13 OSU

4th Quarter

- 11:55 OSU - Herron 12-yard run (Pretorius kick) 30–13 OSU
- 0:42 ILL - Duvalt 24-yard pass from Williams (Eller kick) 30–20 OSU

=== Vs. Michigan ===
at Ohio Stadium, Columbus, Ohio

	1	2	3	4	Total
Wolverines	0	7	0	0	7
#10 Buckeyes	7	7	14	14	42

Ohio State extended their win streak over Michigan to a record five and enjoyed their second biggest victory margin (35) in the series, superseded only by a 38–0 shutout in 1935.

==== Scoring summary ====
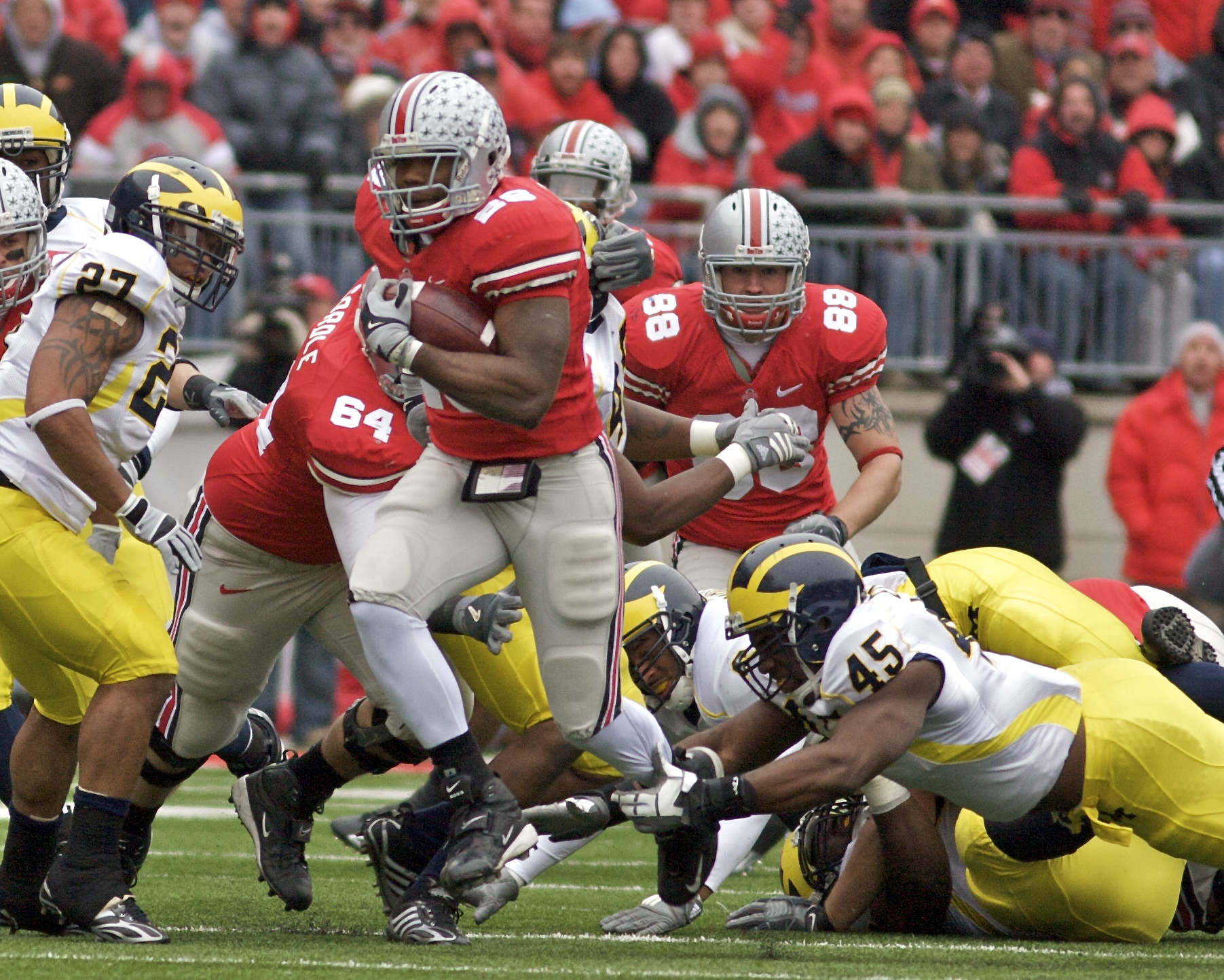
Beanie Wells scored the first touchdown of the game.

1st Quarter

- 3:57 OSU - Wells 59-yard run (Pretorius kick) 7–0 OSU

2nd Quarter

- 13:10 OSU - Hartline 53-yard pass from Pryor (Pretorius kick) 14–0 OSU
- 2:51 MICH - Minor 1-yard run (Lopata kick) 14–7 OSU

3rd Quarter

- 11:04 OSU - Herron 49-yard run (Pretorius kick) 21–7 OSU
- 3:34 OSU - Robiskie 8-yard pass from Pryor (Pretorius kick) 28–7 OSU

4th Quarter

- 14:52 OSU - Herron 2-yard run (Pretorius kick) 35–7 OSU
- 13:16 OSU - Hartline 18-yard pass from Boeckman (Pretorius kick) 42–7 OSU

=== 2009 Fiesta Bowl - Ohio State vs. Texas ===
at University of Phoenix Stadium, Glendale, Arizona

	1	2	3	4	Total
#10 Buckeyes	3	3	0	15	21
#3 Longhorns	0	3	14	7	24

==== Scoring summary ====
1st Quarter

- 7:28 OSU - Pettrey 51-yard field goal 3–0 OSU

2nd Quarter

- 11:45 TEX - Lawrence 27-yard field goal 3–3
- 5:39 OSU - Pretorius 30-yard field goal 6–3 OSU

3rd Quarter

- 8:29 TEX - McCoy 14-yard rush (Lawrence kick) 10–6 TEX
- 1:04 TEX - Cosby 7-yard pass from McCoy (Lawrence kick) 17–6 TEX

4th Quarter

- 13:22 OSU - Pettrey 44-yard field goal 17–9 TEX
- 7:26 OSU - Pryor 5-yard pass from Boeckman (two-point conversion failed) 17–15 TEX
- 2:05 OSU - Herron 15-yard run (two-point conversion failed) 21–17 OSU
- 0:16 TEX - Cosby 26-yard pass from McCoy (Lawrence kick) 24–21 TEX

== Rankings ==
Ranking movements Legend: ██ Increase in ranking ██ Decrease in ranking ( ) = First-place votes
	Week																
Poll	Pre	1	2	3	4	5	6	7	8	9	10	11	12	13	14	15	Final
AP	2 (21)	3 (15)	5 (1)	13	14	14	12	12	10	13	12	10	10	10	10	10	9
Coaches	3 (14)	3 (10)	5 (1)	14	13	12	11	11	10	13	12	10	10	10	10	10	11
Harris	Not released						12	13	10	12	11	10	10	10	10	10	Not released
BCS	Not released								9	12	11	11	10	10	10	10	Not released

== Coaching staff ==
- Jim Tressel – Head coach (8th year)
- Jim Bollman – Offensive line/OC (8th year)
- Joe Daniels – Quarterbacks (8th year)
- Luke Fickell – Co-defensive coordinator / linebackers coach (7th year)
- Jim Heacock – Defensive coordinator / defensive line (13th year)
- Paul Haynes – Defensive safeties (4th year)
- Darrell Hazell – Assistant head coach / wide receivers (5th year)
- Traver Johnson – Defensive cornerbacks (2nd year)
- John Peterson – Tight ends coach / recruiting coordinator (5th year)
- Dick Tressel – Running backs (8th year)
- Bob Tucker – Director of football operations (14th year)
- Stan Jefferson – Director of player development (5th year)
- Eric Lichter – Director of football performance (3rd year)
- Butch Reynolds – Speed coordinator (4th year)
- Doug Davis – Strength coordinator (2nd year)
- Troy Sutton – Strength coordinator (1st year)

== Roster ==
Wide Receivers: 9 Hartline, Brian - Junior*; 89 Hummel, Garrett - Sophomore; 18 Lisko, David - Senior; 86 Potokar, Dan - Junior; 80 Robiskie, Brian - Senior*; 15 Ruhl, Kyle - Senior; 12 Sanzenbacher, Dane - Sophomore; 82 Small, Ray - Junior; 10 Torrence, Devon - Sophomore; 5 Washington, Taurian - Sophomore; 11 Stoneburner, Jake - Freshman; 8 Posey, DeVier - Freshman; 7 Thomas, Lamaar - Freshman; Offensive Tackles: 75 Boone, Alex- Senior *; 65 Ebner, Doug - Senior; 66 Moses, Andrew - Junior; 77 Smith, Connor - Sophomore; 76 Sika, Scott - Junior; 69 Slagle, Zach - Sophomore; 76 J.B Shugarts - Freshman; 74 Mike Adams - Freshman; Offensive Guards: 68 Blankenship, Evan - Freshman; 70 Browning, Bryant - Sophomore; 67 Mitchum, Kyle - Senior; 63 Person, Ben - Senior *; 71 Rehring, Steve - Junior*; 79 Skinner, Jon - Senior; Centers: 64 Cordle, Jim - Junior*; 57 Malone, Chris - Junior; 50 Brewster, Michael - Freshman*; Tight End: 86 Ballard, Jake - Junior; 46 Larson, J.D - Junior; 82 Miller, Andy - Sophomore; 88 Nicol, Rory - Senior *; 87 Smith, Brandon - Senior; DiLillo, Nic - Freshman; Quarterback: 17 Boeckman, Todd – Senior; 14 Bauserman, Joe - Sophomore; 2 Pryor, Terrelle – Freshman*	Running Back: 46 Christian, K.C. - Sophomore; 35 DeLande, Bo - Sophomore; 33 Gantz, Joe - Junior; 1 Herron, Daniel - Freshman; 3 Saine, Brandon - Sophomore; 28 Wells, Chris - Junior*; 34 Wells, Maurice - Senior; 24 Williams, Marcus - Sophomore; Fullback: 49 Lukens, Ryan - Senior; 43 Olson, Aram - Sophomore; 48 Smith, Spencer - Sophomore; Martin, Jermil - Freshman; Wolfe, Daniel - Freshman; Defensive Lineman: 92 Denlinger, Todd - Junior; 90 Gray, Bryan - Junior; 95 Rietschlin, Chris - Senior; Defensive tackles: 93 Abdallah, Nader - Senior; 97 Heyward, Cameron - Sophomore *; 72 Larimore, Dexter - Sophomore *; Rowell, Shawntel - Freshman; 53 Goebel, Garrett - Freshman; Defensive End: 90 Gibson, Thaddeus - Sophomore *; 57 Ingham, Tom - Junior; 44 Johnson, Mark - Sophomore; 9 Rose, Robert - Sophomore *; 98 Thomas, Solomon - Freshman; 87 Wilson, Lawrence - Junior (Out for season); 84 Worthington, Doug - Junior; 96 Mobley, Willie - Freshman; 94 Wells, Keith - Freshman; Cornerbacks: 13 Amos, Andre - Junior; 4 Coleman, Kurt - Junior *; 2 Jenkins, Malcolm - Senior *; 29 Lane, Shaun - Senior; Howard, Travis - Freshman; Defensive Backs: 5 Chekwa, Chimdi - Sophomore*; 36 Daniels, Matt - Senior; 39 Dougherty, Michael - Senior; 30 Evege, Donnie - Freshman; 24 Schwartz, Grant - Sophomore; 11 Scott, James - Sophomore; 20 Washington, Donald - Junior; 17 Willis, Zach - Senior	Linebackers: 1 Freeman, Marcus - Senior *; 7 Hines, Jermale - Sophomore * (safety); 51 Homan, Ross - Sophomore *; 33 Laurinaitis, James - Senior*; 59 Libby, Kyle - Sophomore; 26 Moeller, Tyler - Sophomore; 36 Rolle, Brian - Sophomore; 38 Spitler, Austin - Junior; 55 Terry, Curtis - Senior; 6 Sabino, Etienne - Freshman; 42 Sweat, Andrew - Freshman; Williams, Nathan - Freshman; Safety: 8 Gant, Aaron - Junior; 3 O'Neal, Jamario - Senior; 14 Oliver, Nate - Freshman; 23 Patterson, Nick - Senior; 25 Pentello, Rocco - Freshman; 21 Russell, Anderson - Junior*; Domicone, Zach - Freshman; Johnson, Orhian - Freshman; Long Snappers: 52 Curtis, Don - Sophomore; 53 Howe, Patrick - Sophomore; 96 McQuaide, Jake - Sophomore; Kickers: 12 Barclay, Devin - Sophomore; 39 Good, Andrew - Junior; 41 Mattimoe, Matt - Junior; 20 Pettrey, Aaron - Junior *; 85 Pretorius, Ryan - Senior; Buchanan, Ben - Freshman

== Players drafted into the NFL ==
Round	Pick	Player	Position	NFL Club
1	14	Malcolm Jenkins	CB	New Orleans Saints
1	31	Beanie Wells	RB	Arizona Cardinals
2	35	James Laurinaitis	LB	St. Louis Rams
2	36	Brian Robiskie	WR	Cleveland Browns
4	102	Donald Washington	CB	Kansas City Chiefs
4	108	Brian Hartline	WR	Miami Dolphins
5	154	Marcus Freeman	LB	Chicago Bears
