= Ryan McDonald =

Ryan McDonald may refer to:

- Ryan MacDonald (author) (born 1977), American writer, sound and visual artist
- Ryan MacDonald (rugby league), English rugby league player
- Ryan McDonald (American actor) (1930-2020), American actor
- Ryan McDonald (Canadian actor) (born 1984), Canadian actor
- Ryan McDonald (American football) (born 1985), American football center

== See also ==
- Ran McDonald (1889–1950), Canadian professional ice hockey player
