= 2007 All-Big Ten Conference football team =

American college football all-star team

The 2007 All-Big Ten Conference football team consists of American football players chosen as All-Big Ten Conference players for the 2007 NCAA Division I-A football season. The conference recognizes two official All-Big Ten selectors: (1) the Big Ten conference coaches selected separate offensive and defensive units and named first- and second-team players (the "Coaches" team); and (2) a panel of sports writers and broadcasters covering the Big Ten also selected offensive and defensive units and named first- and second-team players (the "Media" team).

== Offensive selections ==
=== Quarterbacks ===
- Chad Henne, Michigan (Coaches-1)
- Todd Boeckman, Ohio State (Coaches-HM; Media-1)
- Kellen Lewis, Indiana (Coaches-2; Media-2)

=== Running backs ===
- Rashard Mendenhall, Illinois (Coaches-1; Media-1)
- Beanie Wells, Ohio State (Coaches-1; Media-1)
- Mike Hart, Michigan (Coaches-2; Media-2)
- Javon Ringer, Michigan State (Coaches-2; Media-2)

=== Receivers ===
- James Hardy, Indiana (Coaches-1; Media-1)
- Mario Manningham, Michigan (Coaches-1; Media-1)
- Devin Thomas, Michigan State (Coaches-2; Media-2)
- Dorien Bryant, Purdue (Coaches-2; Media-2)

=== Centers ===
- A. Q. Shipley, Penn State (Coaches-1)
- Marcus Coleman, Wisconsin (Media-1)
- Ryan McDonald, Illinois (Coaches-2; Media-2)

=== Guards ===
- Martin O'Donnell, Illinois (Coaches-1; Media-1)
- Adam Kraus, Michigan (Coaches-1; Media-1)
- Rich Ohrnberger, Penn State (Coaches-2; Media-2)
- Kraig Urbik, Wisconsin (Coaches-2; Media-2)

=== Tackles ===
- Jake Long, Michigan (Coaches-1; Media-1)
- Kirk Barton, Ohio State (Coaches-1; Media-1)
- Alex Boone, Ohio State (Coaches-2; Media-2)
- Xavier Fulton, Illinois (Coaches-2)
- Pete Clifford, Michigan State (Media-2)

=== Tight ends ===
- Travis Beckum, Wisconsin (Coaches-1; Media-1)
- Dustin Keller, Purdue (Coaches-2; Media-2)

== Defensive selections ==
=== Defensive linemen ===
- Greg Middleton, Indiana (Coaches-1; Media-1)
- Vernon Gholston, Ohio State (Coaches-1; Media-1)
- Maurice Evans, Penn State (Coaches-1; Media-1)
- Mitch King, Iowa (Coaches-1; Media-2)
- Jonal Saint-Dic, Michigan State (Coaches-2; Media-1)

=== Linebackers ===
- Jeremy Leman, Illinois (Coaches-1; Media-1)
- James Laurinaitis, Ohio State (Coaches-1; Media-1)
- Dan Connor, Penn State (Coaches-1; Media-1)
- Shawn Crable, Michigan (Coaches-2; Media-2)
- Sean Lee, Penn State (Coaches-2; Media-2)
- Marcus Freeman, Ohio State (Coaches-2)
- Mike Humpal, Iowa (Media-2)

=== Defensive backs ===
- Malcolm Jenkins, Ohio State (Coaches-1; Media-1)
- Justin King, Penn State (Coaches-1; Media-1)
- Jack Ikegwuonu, Wisconsin (Coaches-1; Media-1)
- Vontae Davis, Illinois (Coaches-1; Media-2)
- Tracy Porter, Indiana (Coaches-2; Media-1)
- Jamar Adams, Michigan (Coaches-2; Media-2)

== Special teams ==
=== Kickers ===
- Taylor Mehlhaff, Wisconsin (Coaches-1; Media-2)
- Austin Starr, Indiana (Coaches-2; Media-1)

=== Punters ===
- Jeremy Boone, Penn State (Coaches-1; Media-1)
- Ken DeBauche, Wisconsin (Coaches-2)
- Justin Kucek, Minnesota (Media-2)

== Key ==
Bold = selected as a first-team player by both the coaches and media panel

Coaches = selected by Big Ten Conference coaches

Media = selected by a media panel

HM = Honorable mention

== See also ==
- 2007 College Football All-America Team
