= Jonal Saint-Dic =

Haitian gridiron football player (born 1985)

Profile
- Position: Defensive end

Personal information
- Born: March 2, 1985 (age 41); Port-au-Prince, Haiti
- Listed height: 6 ft 0 in (1.83 m)
- Listed weight: 253 lb (115 kg)

Career information
- College: Michigan State
- NFL draft: 2008: undrafted

Career history
- Kansas City Chiefs (2008)*
- * Offseason or practice squad member only

Awards and highlights
- Second-team All-American (2007); First-team All-Big Ten (2007); Big Ten record: most forced fumbles (8)

Jonal Saint-Dic (/ˈdʒoʊnɔːl ˈdiːk/ JOH-nawl DEEK; born March 2, 1985) is a former American football defensive end. He was signed by the Chiefs as an undrafted free agent in 2008. He played college football at Michigan State.

== Personal life ==
Saint-Dic is the son of Jonas and Marie Point du Jour. He was born in Haiti. He migrated to Linden, New Jersey then moved to nearby Elizabeth, New Jersey. He graduated from Michigan State majoring in sociology.

=== Early life ===
Jonal attended Elizabeth High School in New Jersey, where he was a two-way starter, playing defensive end and tight end. In 2002, he earned second-team all-state honors as a senior after being credited with 24.5 sacks.

== College career ==
=== Hudson Valley ===
Jonal played for Coach Bob Jojo at Hudson Valley Community College in Troy, New York. As a Sophomore, he was named Northeast Football Conference Defensive Player of the Year. In 2004, he led the league in tackles for losses (28 for 125 yards), sacks (11.5 for 63) and forced fumbles (6). His career totals include 118 tackles, including a school-record 21 sacks for 116 yards.

=== Michigan State ===
During the 2005 season, Saint-Dic was granted a medical redshirt after missing the last seven games of the 2005 season with a groin injury. He made his only appearance of the 2005 season in the Big Ten opener vs. Illinois. As a Junior, Saint-Dic had 23 tackles, 3.5 of which were for losses. In 2007, as a Senior, Saint-Dic emerged as one of the top defensive lineman in the Big Ten. He was named a second-team All-American by the Walter Camp Football Foundation. He was also named one of eight finalists for the Ted Hendricks Award. Also in 2007, Jonal became a first-team All-Big Ten selection by the media and a second-team selection by the coaches. He set a Big Ten record with eight forced fumbles. Saint-Dic had 10 career forced fumbles, which ties him for seventh best in FBS history. He was named Big Ten Defensive Player of the Week after the Spartan's game against Pittsburgh. Saint-Dic was one of five MSU players who were suspended before the Champs Sports Bowl against Boston College, which the Spartans lost 24-21 on Dec. 28, 2007. He was suspended because he was academically ineligible to play.

== Professional career ==
=== Kansas City Chiefs ===
After going undrafted in the 2008 NFL draft, Saint-Dic was signed as an undrafted free agent by the Kansas City Chiefs on July 31. He was cut by team in late August, 2008.
