= Pete Clifford =

American football player (born 1984)

No. 75
- Position: Offensive tackle

Personal information
- Born: April 3, 1984 (age 42); Salem, New Hampshire, U.S.
- Listed height: 6 ft 7 in (2.01 m)
- Listed weight: 312 lb (142 kg)

Career information
- College: Michigan State
- NFL draft: 2008: undrafted

Career history
- Arizona Cardinals (2008)*; Tennessee Titans (2009); Hartford Colonials (2010); New York Jets (2011)*
- * Offseason or practice squad member only

Awards and highlights
- Second-team All-Big Ten (2007)
- Stats at Pro Football Reference

Pete Clifford (born April 3, 1984) is an American former professional football player who was an offensive tackle in the National Football League (NFL). He played college football for the Michigan State Spartans and was signed by the Arizona Cardinals as an undrafted free agent in 2008.

Clifford was also a member of the Tennessee Titans, Hartford Colonials, and New York Jets.

== Professional career ==
=== Arizona Cardinals ===
After going undrafted in the 2008 NFL draft, Clifford was signed by the Arizona Cardinals as an undrafted free agent. He was released with an injury settlement on August 30 during final cuts after rehabbing for five weeks he attended a workout with the Tennessee Titans and re-aggravated his injury he sustained in training camp. He then spent the rest of the season out of football.

=== Tennessee Titans ===
Clifford was signed to a future contract by the Tennessee Titans on January 7, 2009. In June 2009, he was placed on the Waived/Injured list.

=== Hartford Colonials ===
Clifford was signed by the Hartford Colonials of the United Football League on August 26, 2010.

=== New York Jets ===
Clifford was signed by the New York Jets on August 5, 2011. He was waived on September 2.
