= Ryan MacDonald (author) =

American writer (born 1977)

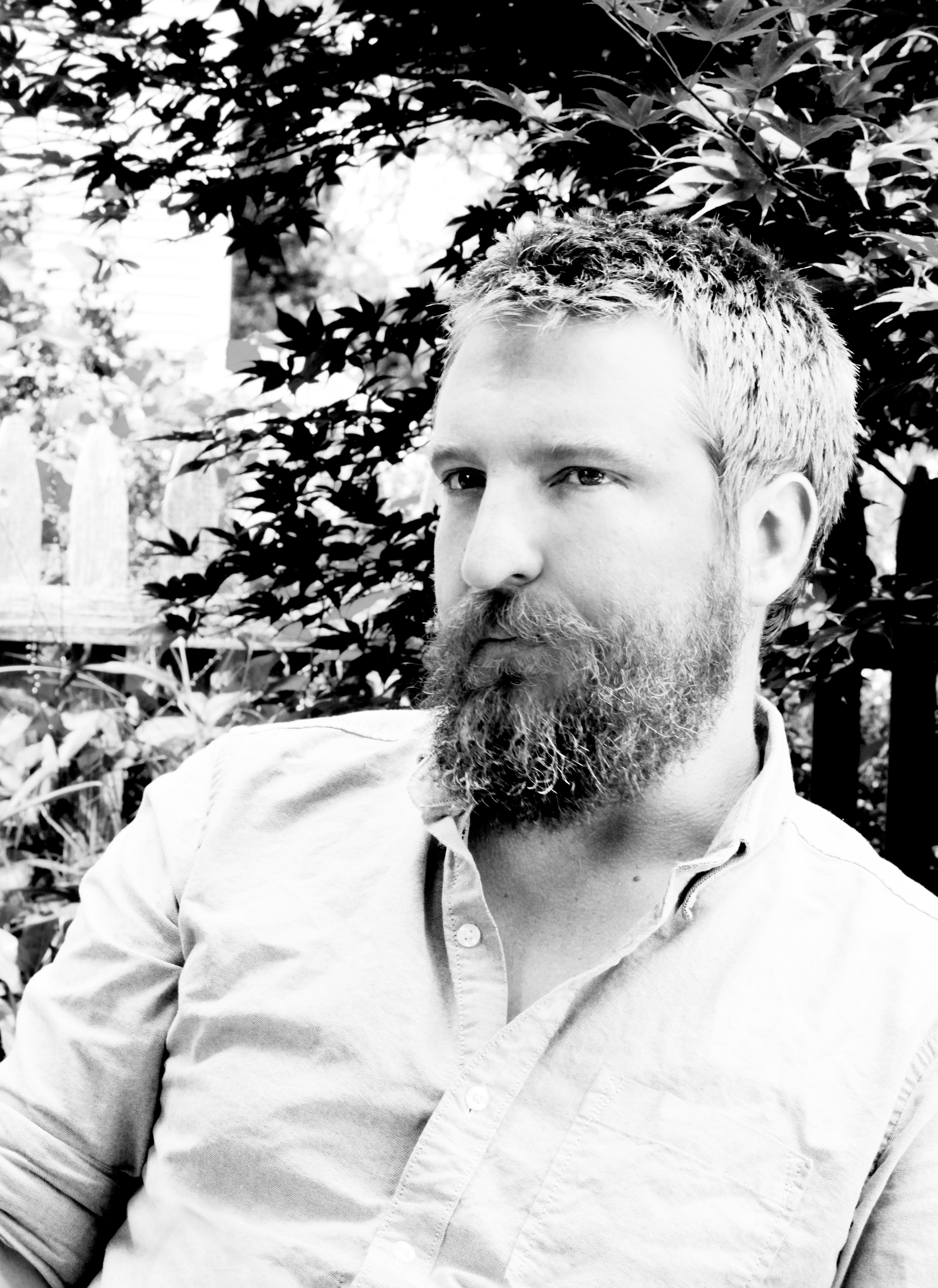
- Born: Ryan Alexander MacDonald; May 25, 1977 (age 49); Kansas City, Missouri, U.S.
- Education: Kansas City Art Institute (BFA); University of Massachusetts Amherst (MFA)
- Occupations: Writer; sound and visual artist

Ryan Alexander MacDonald (born May 25, 1977, in Kansas City, Missouri) is an American writer, sound and visual artist. He won the American Short(er) Fiction Award for his title story in 2012.

== Education ==
MacDonald earned a BFA from the Kansas City Art Institute, a Master of Fine Arts degree in Studio Art and a Master of Fine Arts in English from the University of Massachusetts, Amherst (where he was a University Fellow).

== Career ==
He is the author of The Observable Characteristics of Organisms (2014) from Fiction Collective Two. In 2012, he won the American Short(er) Fiction Award for his title story. In 2017 he was nominated for a Bessie Award in Outstanding Composition and Sound Design for Choreographer Vanessa Anspaugh's, The End of Men, Again. He has worked for over fifteen years in collaboration with his wife, Choreographer Aretha Aoki. Aoki and MacDonald's 2020 performance, IzumonookunI, a dance/punk/goth-glam/synthwave show that weaves together the lost history of kabuki and its real and imagined influences and offshoots also features their daughter, Frankie Mayfield Aoki-MacDonald.

== Bibliography ==
- The Observable Characteristics of Organisms. FC2 2014. ISBN 978-1-57366-182-9
