= James Laurinaitis =

American football player and coach (born 1986)

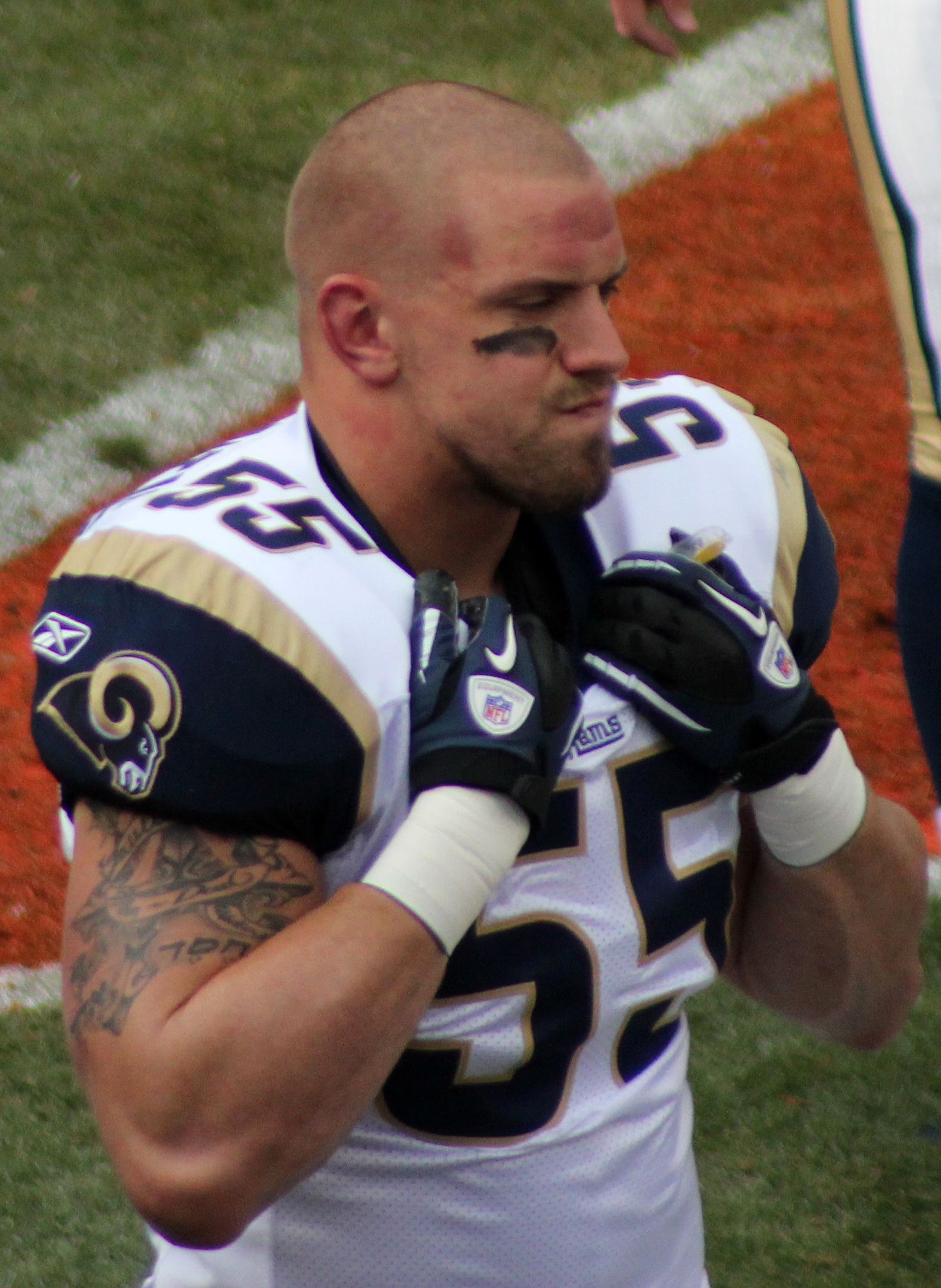
- Laurinaitis with the St. Louis Rams in 2010

Ohio State Buckeyes
- Title: Linebackers coach

Personal information
- Born: December 3, 1986 (age 39); Wayzata, Minnesota, U.S.
- Listed height: 6 ft 2 in (1.88 m)
- Listed weight: 248 lb (112 kg)

Career information
- Position: Linebacker (No. 55, 53)
- High school: Wayzata (Plymouth, Minnesota)
- College: Ohio State (2005–2008)
- NFL draft: 2009: 2nd round, 35th overall pick

Career history

Playing
- St. Louis Rams (2009–2015); New Orleans Saints (2016)

Coaching
- Notre Dame (2022) Graduate assistant; Ohio State (2023) Graduate assistant; Ohio State (2024–present) Linebackers coach

Awards and highlights
- As player: NFL solo tackles leader (2012); Lott Trophy (2008); Butkus Award (2007); Bronko Nagurski Trophy (2006); 2× Jack Lambert Trophy (2007, 2008); 2× Big Ten Defensive Player of the Year (2007, 2008); Unanimous All-American (2007); 2× Consensus All-American (2006, 2008); 3× First-team All-Big Ten (2006–2008); As assistant coach: CFP national champion (2024)

Career NFL statistics
- Tackles: 871
- Sacks: 16.5
- Safeties: 1
- Forced fumbles: 1
- Fumble recoveries: 9
- Interceptions: 10
- Interception yards: 74
- Pass deflections: 35
- Stats at Pro Football Reference
- College Football Hall of Fame

James Richard Laurinaitis (born December 3, 1986) is an American football coach and former player. He currently serves as the linebackers coach at the Ohio State University. He played as a linebacker for the St. Louis Rams and New Orleans Saints of the National Football League (NFL). He played college football for the Ohio State Buckeyes, where he was a three-time consensus All-American and won numerous awards. He was selected by the Rams in the second round of the 2009 NFL draft.

== Early life ==
Laurinaitis was born in Wayzata, Minnesota. He was raised in a family of athletes; his father Joe, a WWE Hall of Famer also known as "Road Warrior Animal", and two uncles (John and Marcus) were professional wrestlers. He attended Wayzata High School, and played high school football and ice hockey. He was touted as a potential second or third-round National Hockey League (NHL) draft pick, but teams did not draft him because it was thought that he was more likely to pursue a football career. While he was a successful ice hockey player, having been named a team captain as a senior, football was arguably his best sport. He was named Defensive Mr. Football in Minnesota in 2004. That season, he helped lead his high school football team to the state championship game in Class 5A with 193 tackles, including 28 for loss and five sacks.

== College career ==
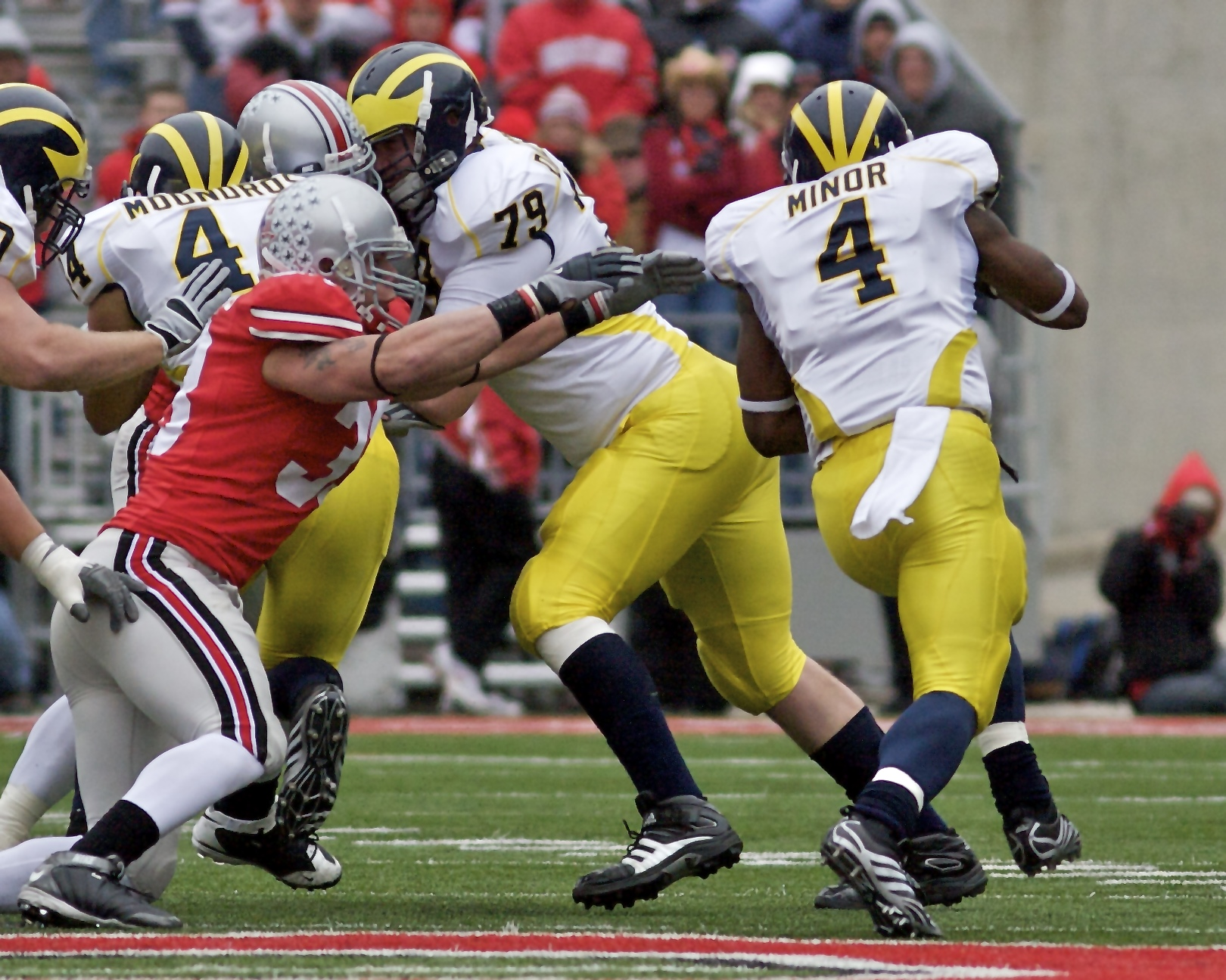
Laurinaitis (red) chases Brandon Minor during the 2008 Michigan–Ohio State rivalry game.

Laurinaitis attended Ohio State University, where he played for coach Jim Tressel's Ohio State Buckeyes football team from 2005 to 2008. As a true freshman in 2005, he played in all 12 games eventually reaching No. 2 on the depth chart at strong-side linebacker behind Bobby Carpenter. After Carpenter broke a leg on the first play from scrimmage in their rivalry game against Michigan, Laurinaitis played the rest of that game, and also started in their Fiesta Bowl victory over Notre Dame. At the end of the 2006 regular season, Laurinaitis led the team in tackles (115) and interceptions (5), and also had 8.5 tackles for loss and 4.0 sacks.

In 2006 Laurinaitis won the Nagurski Award as the nation's best defensive player, and was also named a finalist for the Butkus and Bednarik awards. He was a first-team All-Big Ten selection, and was recognized as a consensus first-team All-American. Laurinaitis won the Butkus Award for most outstanding college linebacker in 2007. He was also recognized as a unanimous first-team All-American in 2007, having been named to the first-teams of multiple selectors including the Associated Press (AP), the American Football Coaches Association (AFCA), FWAA, Sporting News, the Walter Camp Foundation, and Rivals.com. He was honored as the Big Ten Defensive Player of the Year.

In 2008, he was named one of four finalists for the 2008 Rotary Lombardi Award (only Big Ten player in consideration for that award) and the winner of the Lott Trophy for The Defensive IMPACT Player of the Year and the recipient of the Lowe's Senior CLASS Award. He was recognized as a consensus first-team All-American for the third consecutive year. He was also a finalist for the Chuck Bednarik Award, presented to the nation's top defender by the Maxwell Club of Philadelphia and one of five defensive players among fifteen finalists for the Walter Camp Player of the Year award. He started all thirteen games, becoming the fourth player in school history to lead the team in tackles three times in a career, as he ranked second in the Big Ten and 14th nationally with an average of 10.0 tackles per game. He recorded a career-high 130 tackles (52 solos) that included four sacks, seven stops for losses and one quarterback pressure, caused a fumble, deflected four passes and picked off two others.

Laurinaitis is the only player to ever win two Big Ten Defensive Player of the Year awards (in both coaches and media).

On January 14, 2026, Laurinaitis was inducted into the College Football Hall of Fame.

== Professional career ==
=== Pre-draft ===
Laurinaitis attended the NFL Scouting Combine and performed all of the combine and positional drills. On March 19, 2009, he participated at Ohio State's Pro day and improved his 40-yard dash (4.72s), 20-yard dash (2.72s), 10-yard dash (1.59s), short shuttle (4.18s), and three-cone drill (6.81s). At the conclusion of the pre-draft process, Laurinaitis was projected to be a first or second round pick by NFL draft experts or scouts. He was ranked as the second best inside linebacker prospect in the draft by DraftScout.com and NFL analyst Mike Mayock.

Pre-draft measurables
Height	Weight	40-yard dash	10-yard split	20-yard split	20-yard shuttle	Three-cone drill	Vertical jump	Broad jump	Bench press	Wonderlic
6 ft 1 7/8 in (1.88 m)	244 lb (111 kg)	4.88 s	1.74 s	2.85 s	4.24 s	6.93 s	33 in (0.84 m)	9 ft 7 in (2.92 m)	17 reps	21
All values from NFL Combine

=== St. Louis Rams ===
==== 2009 ====
Laurinaitis playing in Denver on November 28, 2010.

The St. Louis Rams selected Laurinaitis in the second round (35th overall) of the 2009 NFL draft. Laurinaitis was the fourth linebacker drafted in 2009, behind Aaron Curry, Brian Cushing, and Clay Matthews III.

On July 29, 2009, the Rams signed Laurinaitis to a four-year, $5.1 million contract that included $3.3 million guaranteed.

Laurinaitis entered training camp slated as the starting middle linebacker, replacing Will Witherspoon. Head coach Steve Spagnuolo named Laurinaitis the starting middle linebacker to begin the regular season.

He made his professional regular season debut and his first career start in the St. Louis Rams' season-opener at the Seattle Seahawks and recorded 14 combined tackles (ten solo) in their 28–0 loss. On October 9, 2009, Laurinaitis recorded six solo tackles, a pass deflection, and made his first career interception during a 38–10 loss to the Minnesota Vikings in Week 5. Laurinaitis made his first career interception off a pass by Vikings' quarterback Brett Favre, that was originally intended for wide receiver Bernard Berrian, and returned it for a seven-yard gain in the second quarter. In Week 12, he collected nine solo tackles and made his first career sack during a 27–17 loss to the Seattle Seahawks. Laurinaitis made his first career sack on quarterback Matt Hasselbeck for a seven-yard loss in the first quarter. He started in all 16 games during his rookie season in 2009 and recorded 120 combined tackles (107 solo), five pass deflections, two interceptions, two sacks, and a forced fumble. He earned the Carroll Rosenbloom Memorial Award, which goes to the Rams rookie of the year. He was also named to the NFL All-Rookie team by Sporting News.

==== 2010 ====
Defensive coordinator Ken Flajole retained Laurinaitis as the starting middle linebacker to begin training camp. Head coach Steve Spagnuolo officially named him the starter to begin the regular season, alongside outside linebackers Larry Grant and Na'il Diggs. On October 31, 2010, he collected eight combined tackles, deflected a pass, made a sack, and recorded an interception during a 20–10 victory against the Carolina Panthers. Laurinaitis intercepted a pass by quarterback Matt Moore, that was originally a flea flicker intended for wide receiver Steve Smith Sr. on the Panthers' first offensive play of the game. In Week 11, he collected a season-high 11 combined tackles (eight solo) during a 34–17 loss to the Atlanta Falcons. On December 19, 2010, Laurinaitis made a season-high 11 combined tackles (ten solo) and broke up one pass in the Rams' 27–13 loss to the Kansas City Chiefs in Week 15. He started all 16 games in 2010 and finished his second season with 114 combined tackles (98 solo), five pass deflections, three sacks, and an interception.

==== 2011 ====
Laurinaitis retained his starting middle linebacker role in 2011 and started alongside outside linebackers Bryan Kehl and Ronald Bartell. On September 19, 2011, he collected a season-high 14 combined tackles (nine solo) in the Rams' 28–16 loss at the New York Giants in Week 2. In Week 11, Laurinaitis recorded a season-high 13 solo tackles during a 24–7 loss to the Seattle Seahawks. He started all 16 games and finished the 2011 season with a career-high 142 combined tackles (105 solo), seven passes defensed, three sacks, and two interceptions.

==== 2012 ====
On January 2, 2012, the Rams fired head coach Steve Spagnuolo and general manager Billy Devaney after they finished with a 2–14 record and did not qualify for the playoffs in their third consecutive season. Defensive coordinator Gregg Williams was suspended for the entire season due to his involvement on the New Orleans Saints bounty scandal. The Rams resorted to having the assistant defensive coaches fill in for Williams. Laurinaitis entered training camp slated as the starting middle linebacker. Head coach Jeff Fisher officially named Laurinaitis the starter to begin the regular season, along with outside linebackers Rocky McIntosh and Jo-Lonn Dunbar.

On September 8, 2012, the Rams signed Laurinaitis to a five-year, $42.12 million contract extension with $23.50 million guaranteed and a signing bonus of $2 million.

On October 21, 2012, Laurinaitis collected a season-high 14 combined tackles (13 solo) in the Rams' 30–20 loss to the Green Bay Packers in Week 7. In Week 12, he tied his season-high of 14 combined tackles (seven solo), deflected a pass, and made his first interception of the season during a 31–17 win at the Arizona Cardinals. Laurinaitis intercepted a pass by Cardinals' quarterback Ryan Lindley, that was intended for wide receiver Larry Fitzgerald, and returned it for an 18-yard gain in the fourth quarter. On December 23, 2012, Laurinaitis recorded 12 combined tackles (11 solo), a season-high two pass deflections, and intercepted a pass by Josh Freeman in a 28–13 win at the Tampa Bay Buccaneers in Week 16. He started in all 16 games in 2012 and recorded a career-high 142 combined tackles (117 solo), five pass deflections, two interceptions, and was credited with half a sack.

==== 2013 ====
The Rams hired Tim Walton as their new defensive coordinator. Walton retained the 4–3 defense and named Laurinaitis the starting middle linebacker to start the regular season, along with outside linebackers Alec Ogletree and Will Witherspoon. On September 26, 2013, he collected a season-high 12 combined tackles (nine solo) and broke up two passes during a 35–11 loss to the San Francisco 49ers in Week 4. In Week 16, he recorded six combined tackles and was credited with a season-high 1.5 sacks on quarterback Mike Glennon in the Rams' 23–13 win against the Tampa Bay Buccaneers. He started in all 16 games and recorded 116 combined tackles (85 solo), a career-high nine pass deflections, 3.5 sacks, and two interceptions.

==== 2014 ====
On January 29, 2014, the Rams announced the decision to mutually part ways with defensive coordinator Tim Walton. The Rams brought back defensive coordinator Gregg Williams and retained Laurinaitis as the starting middle linebacker, along with outside linebackers Jo-Lonn Dunbar and Alec Ogletree. On November 16, 2014, Laurinaitis recorded a season-high 11 combined tackles (seven solo) and made one sack during a 22–7 win against the Denver Broncos in Week 7. In Week 14, he collected six combined tackles, deflected a pass, and was credited with a season-high 1.5 sacks in the Rams' 24–0 win at the Washington Redskins. He started in all 16 games in 2014 and recorded 109 combined tackles (81 solo), 3.5 sacks, and two pass deflections.

==== 2015 ====
Laurinaitis returned as the starting middle linebacker in 2015, along with outside linebackers Alec Ogletree and Akeem Ayers. In Week 2, he collected a season-high nine combined tackles during a 24–10 loss at the Washington Redskins. The following week, Laurinaitis made eight combined tackles in the Rams' 12–6 loss to the Pittsburgh Steelers in Week 3. He earned his 916th tackle during the game which moved him into first-place on the franchise's all-time list. The Rams used a different system to track tackles than the NFL. On November 1, 2015, Laurinaitis recorded seven combined tackles and made the first safety of his career in the Rams' 27–6 win against the San Francisco 49ers in Week 8. Laurinaitis tackled running back Mike Davis for a one-yard loss in the endzone for a safety in the first quarter. In Week 12, he tied his season-high of nine combined tackles during a 31–7 loss at the Cincinnati Bengals. Laurinaitis started in all 16 games in 2015 and recorded 109 combined tackles (61 solo), a pass deflection, a sack, an interception, and a safety.

==== 2016 ====
On February 19, 2016, the Rams released Laurinaitis. He finished his tenure with the Rams with 852 combined tackles, 34 pass deflections, 16.5 sacks, and ten interceptions and started every single regular season game over seven seasons. His streak stood at 112 consecutive starts at the time of his release. Laurinaitis attended meetings with the New Orleans Saints and Atlanta Falcons.

=== New Orleans Saints ===
On March 16, 2016, the New Orleans Saints signed Laurinaitis to a three-year, $8.25 million contract with a signing bonus of $1.80 million.

Head coach Sean Payton named Laurinaitis the starting middle linebacker to begin the regular season, along with outside linebackers Dannell Ellerbe and Stephone Anthony. He started in the New Orleans Saints' season-opener against the Oakland Raiders and collected a season-high seven combined tackles and deflected a pass in their 35–34 loss. On September 26, 2016, Laurinaitis recorded seven combined tackles during a 45–32 loss against the Atlanta Falcons in Week 3. Laurinaitis sustained an injury to his quadriceps during the Saints' loss to the Falcons and was sidelined for the next two games (Weeks 4–5). His injury ended his streak of 115 consecutive starts. On November 5, 2016, Laurinaitis was placed on injured reserve after re-injuring his quadriceps. On November 17, 2016, Laurinaitis was waived by the Saints from the injured reserve. He finished the season with 17 combined tackles (nine solo) and a pass deflection in five games and three starts.

On April 11, 2017, Laurinaitis announced his retirement after an 8-year career in the NFL.

== Career statistics ==
=== NFL ===
Legend
**Bold**	Career high

Year	Team	Games		Tackles					Int & Fum						
Year	Team	GP	GS	Cmb	Solo	Ast	TfL	Sck	PD	Int	FF	FR	QBH	Blk	TD
2009	STL	16	16	120	107	13	4	2.0	5	**2**	**1**	1	6	0	0
2010	STL	16	16	114	98	16	**8**	3.0	5	1	0	1	**7**	0	0
2011	STL	16	16	**142**	105	37	**8**	3.0	7	**2**	0	1	5	0	0
2012	STL	16	16	**142**	**117**	25	4	0.5	4	**2**	0	1	2	0	0
2013	STL	16	16	116	85	31	6	**3.5**	**10**	**2**	0	**2**	4	0	0
2014	STL	16	16	109	81	28	3	**3.5**	2	0	0	**2**	**7**	0	0
2015	STL	16	16	109	61	**48**	0	1.0	1	1	**1**	0	0	0	0
2016	NO	5	3	17	9	8	0	0.0	1	0	0	1	0	0	0
Career		117	115	869	663	206	32	16.5	35	10	2	9	31	0	0

=== College ===
Year	Team	Games		Tackles					Int & Fum						
Year	Team	GP	GS	Cmb	Solo	Ast	TfL	Sck	PD	Int	FF	FR	QBH	Blk	TD
2005	OSU	12	0	9	3	6	0.5	0.0	0	0	0	0	1	0	0
2006	OSU	13	13	115	53	62	8.5	4.0	4	5	3	1	2	0	0
2007	OSU	13	13	121	51	70	8.5	5.0	1	2	0	1	0	0	0
2008	OSU	13	13	130	52	78	7	4.0	4	2	1	0	2	0	0
Career		51	39	365	159	216	24.5	13.0	9	9	4	2	5	0	0

== Coaching career ==
Laurinaitis entered the coaching profession in 2022 when he was named a graduate assistant and assistant linebackers coach for Notre Dame under former Ohio State teammate Marcus Freeman. The following season, he was named to the same position for his alma mater, Ohio State. On February 15, 2024, Ohio State named Laurinaitis as linebackers coach.

== Personal life ==
Laurinaitis is one of two children born to Joseph and Julie Laurinaitis. He has Lithuanian roots on his father's side. Laurinaitis has a half-brother, Joseph Jr., from his father's first marriage, who is a veteran of the Iraq War and training to become a police officer. His younger sister, Jessica, played on her high school ice hockey team.

Laurinaitis comes from a family that has significant ties to professional wrestling. His father Joe wrestled as Road Warrior Animal, one half of legendary wrestling tag-team The Road Warriors with Road Warrior Hawk. His uncle Marcus wrestled in Europe, Japan, and the United States as The Terminator and later Fury. His other uncle, John, wrestled as Johnny Ace and was a star in Japan, later becoming an executive with WWE.

On March 23, 2013, Laurinaitis married Shelly Williams whom he met while attending Ohio State University. The couple has three daughters named London, Hayden, Remi, and a son, Maverick.

Laurinaitis is an evangelical Christian. Laurinaitis has spoken about his faith saying, "To me, there's nothing that trumps my faith in Christ—not even an NFL career. Everything I have on this earth is borrowed. All that really matters is eternity. God has blessed me with a platform and with an opportunity to do something that I love to do. Out of my gratefulness, I give all that I have as if He's the only One watching."

The Big Ten Network hired Laurinaitis in 2017 as a college football analyst and co-host of a weekly Ohio State show on SportsTime Ohio. In 2018, Laurinaitis was hired by radio station 97.1 The Fan where he co-hosted a midday sports talk program until 2022.
