= Andrew Sweat =

American football player (born 1989)

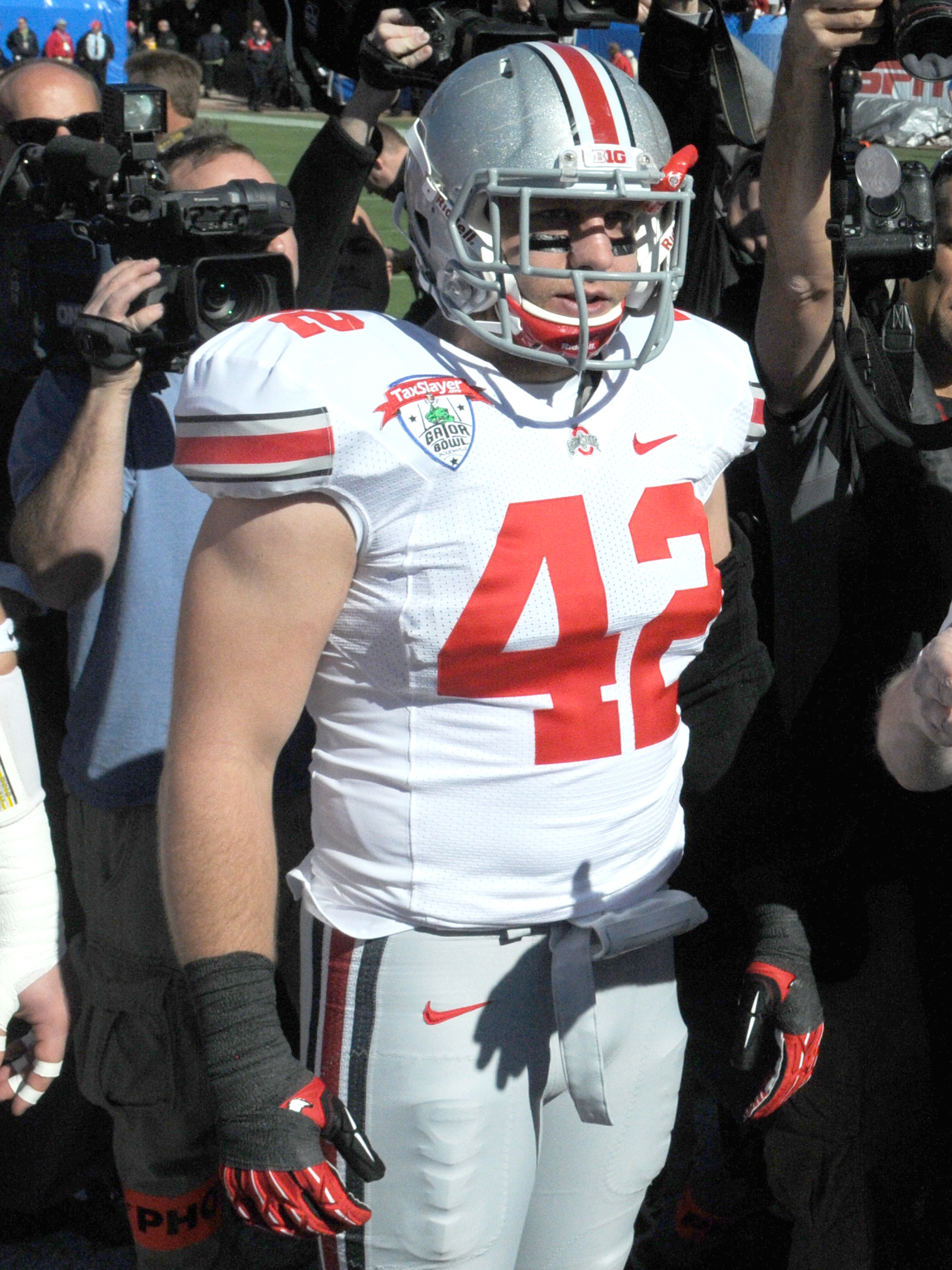
- Sweat at the 2012 Gator Bowl

Profile
- Position: Linebacker

Personal information
- Born: April 11, 1989 (age 37); Washington, Pennsylvania, U.S.
- Listed height: 6 ft 2 in (1.88 m)
- Listed weight: 238 lb (108 kg)

Career information
- College: Ohio State
- NFL draft: 2012: undrafted

Career history
- Cleveland Browns (2012)*
- * Offseason or practice squad member only

Awards and highlights
- Second-team All-Big Ten (2011)

Andrew Sweat (born April 11, 1989) is an American former football linebacker who played college football for the Ohio State Buckeyes from 2008 to 2011.

== Early life ==
Sweat was born in Washington, Pennsylvania on April 11, 1989, to Cheryl and Gary Sweat. He has an older sister, Elizabeth, and a younger sister, Emily.

Sweat started playing football at a young age. Sweat played through a high school career at Trinity High School in Washington, Pennsylvania. He then signed to play with Ohio State University for the class of 2008. He graduated high school early to attend early spring workouts at Ohio State. After college, he was a physical rehabilitator for people recently recovering from injuries.

== College career ==
In 2009, Sweat played in 7 games as a reserve linebacker and also on special teams. Sweat earned the starting position at Sam linebacker in the 2010 season. Sweat made 41 tackles and three for losses on the season.

Sweat was a four-year starter, with the first three years being on special teams. He was also a four-year varsity letter winner. Among his athletic accomplishments Sweat was an academic All-American all four years of his college career.

Throughout his college career, Sweat maintained strong grades and majored in marketing at Ohio State's Max M. Fisher College of Business. Sweat also took the LSAT and was accepted into five law schools. Post-graduate academic endeavors were put on hold in favor of the NFL.

== Professional career ==
Sweat signed with the Cleveland Browns as an undrafted free agent on April 28, 2012. He retired shortly after signing, citing concerns about concussions, opting to pursue law school instead of a football career.
