= Ryan McDonald (American football) =

American football player (born 1985)

No. 50
- Position: Center

Personal information
- Born: September 21, 1985 (age 41); Holland, Michigan, U.S.
- Listed height: 6 ft 5 in (1.96 m)
- Listed weight: 295 lb (134 kg)

Career information
- College: Illinois
- NFL draft: 2009: undrafted

Career history
- San Diego Chargers (2009)*; Tampa Bay Storm (2011)
- * Offseason or practice squad member only

Awards and highlights
- 2× Second-team All-Big Ten (2007, 2008)

Career AFL statistics
- Tackles: 4
- Stats at ArenaFan.com

Ryan McDonald (born September 21, 1985) is an American former professional football center. He was signed by the San Diego Chargers as an undrafted free agent in 2009.
