= Ryan Pretorius =

South African American football placekicker

No. 85 – Ohio State Buckeyes
- Position: Kicker
- Class: 2008

Personal information
- Born: 2 May 1979 (age 47); Rhodesia

Career information
- High school: Westville Boys High School
- College: Ohio State

Other information

Rugby union career
- Position: Scrum-half
Senior career
Years	Team	Apps	(Points)
1999	Bath	1	

Ryan Pretorius (born 2 May 1979) is a South African former rugby union player and American football place kicker with the Ohio State Buckeyes. He was raised in Durban, South Africa, and played rugby union professionally before attending Ohio State University to play American football.

== Early life ==
Pretorius was born in Rhodesia and is the grandson of Joe Pretorius, a rugby player who played internationally for Rhodesia and was part of their 1949 10–8 victory over the All Blacks. Pretorius and his family fled to Durban, South Africa, in 1983 after a Zimbabwe Republic Police officer threatened him and his father with an AK-47. He settled with his family in Durban and was educated at Westville Boys High School.

== Rugby ==
After finishing school, Pretorius moved to England and joined the academy of Bath Rugby. He made his one and only appearance for Bath as a scrum-half against Saracens in 1999. He then moved to play rugby in France. For Christmas he got a laptop and looked at American football kickers seeing how far they could kick and then went on holiday to the United States and filmed himself kicking field goals from 65 yards (59 m). After encouragement from fellow South African former NFL kicker Gary Anderson, Pretorius sent copies of the tape to several American universities and was invited to join Ohio State University as a walk-on. When told he would have to pay his way there, he sold his car to his father.

== American football ==
When Pretorius kicked, he wore cleats that were two sizes too small to replicate the feeling of kicking barefoot as he had done when younger practising rugby. He made his debut for the Buckeyes in 2005. In 2006, he was awarded a scholarship to Ohio State. At the time, he was the oldest member of the Ohio State team. In 2007, with a 96% extra point percentage, he was nominated for a Lou Groza Award. He also played in Ohio's 2008 BCS National Championship Game loss to LSU Tigers. In his 2008 season, he scored all but one of his point after touchdown attempts and was a part of Ohio State's 2009 Fiesta Bowl game, a loss to the Texas Longhorns.
