= Todd Boeckman =

American football player (born 1984)

Profile
- Position: Quarterback

Personal information
- Born: June 8, 1984 (age 42); St. Henry, Ohio, U.S.
- Listed height: 6 ft 5 in (1.96 m)
- Listed weight: 243 lb (110 kg)

Career information
- High school: St. Henry
- College: Ohio State (2003–2008)
- NFL draft: 2009: undrafted

Career history
- Jacksonville Jaguars (2009)*
- * Offseason or practice squad member only

Awards and highlights
- First-team All-Big Ten (2007)

Todd Boeckman (born June 8, 1984) is an American former quarterback. He played college football for the Ohio State Buckeyes.

== College career ==
Boeckman was recruited in 2002, but redshirted and grayshirted, extending his stay with Ohio State for two more seasons. After Heisman Trophy winner Troy Smith graduated after the 2006 season, Boeckman beat out fellow quarterbacks Rob Schoenhoft and Antonio Henton for the starting job. In 2007, he passed for 2,375 yards and 25 touchdowns and was named first-team Big Ten. He also led the Buckeyes to the BCS National Championship Game on January 7, 2008. He threw for 208 yards, two touchdowns, and two interceptions as the Buckeyes fell to the LSU Tigers 38–24.

Boeckman entered the 2008 season as a sixth year senior. He was named the starter for the 2008 season, however after losing 35–3 to the USC Trojans, he lost the starting job to Terrelle Pryor. In the 2009 Fiesta Bowl against the Texas Longhorns, Boeckman threw a touchdown pass to Pryor.

=== College statistics ===
Year	Team	Games		Passing								Rushing			
Year	Team	GP	GS	Cmp	Att	Pct	Yds	Y/A	TD	Int	Rtg	Att	Yds	Avg	TD
2003	Ohio State	(redshirt) Redshirted													
2004	Ohio State	Grayshirted													
2005	Ohio State	4	0	5	7	71.4	67	9.6	1	0	199.0	0	0	0.0	0
2006	Ohio State	3	0	2	3	66.7	19	6.3	0	0	119.9	3	4	3.5	1
2007	Ohio State	13	13	191	299	63.9	2,379	8.0	25	14	148.9	56	63	1.1	0
2008	Ohio State	8	3	57	93	61.3	620	6.7	5	2	130.7	23	8	0.3	0
Career		28	16	255	402	63.4	3,085	7.7	31	16	145.4	83	85	0.3	0

== Professional career ==
Boeckman was invited to try out for the Cincinnati Bengals during their rookie minicamp, which concluded on May 3, 2009. Boeckman was among the tryout players not offered a free agent contract. Although Boeckman had a good workout with the Bengals, head coach Marvin Lewis stated that there were already four other quarterbacks on the roster, making it more difficult for Boeckman to land a contract. He also tried out for the Atlanta Falcons.

Boeckman was signed by the Jacksonville Jaguars on June 17. He was waived by the Jaguars on July 31 to make room on the roster for rookie third round pick Terrance Knighton. He was re-signed on August 30 after the team waived Paul Smith. He was then cut on September 5, during final cuts.
