= 2009 Fiesta Bowl =

2009 Tostitos Fiesta Bowl
- BCS Bowl Game; 38th Fiesta Bowl
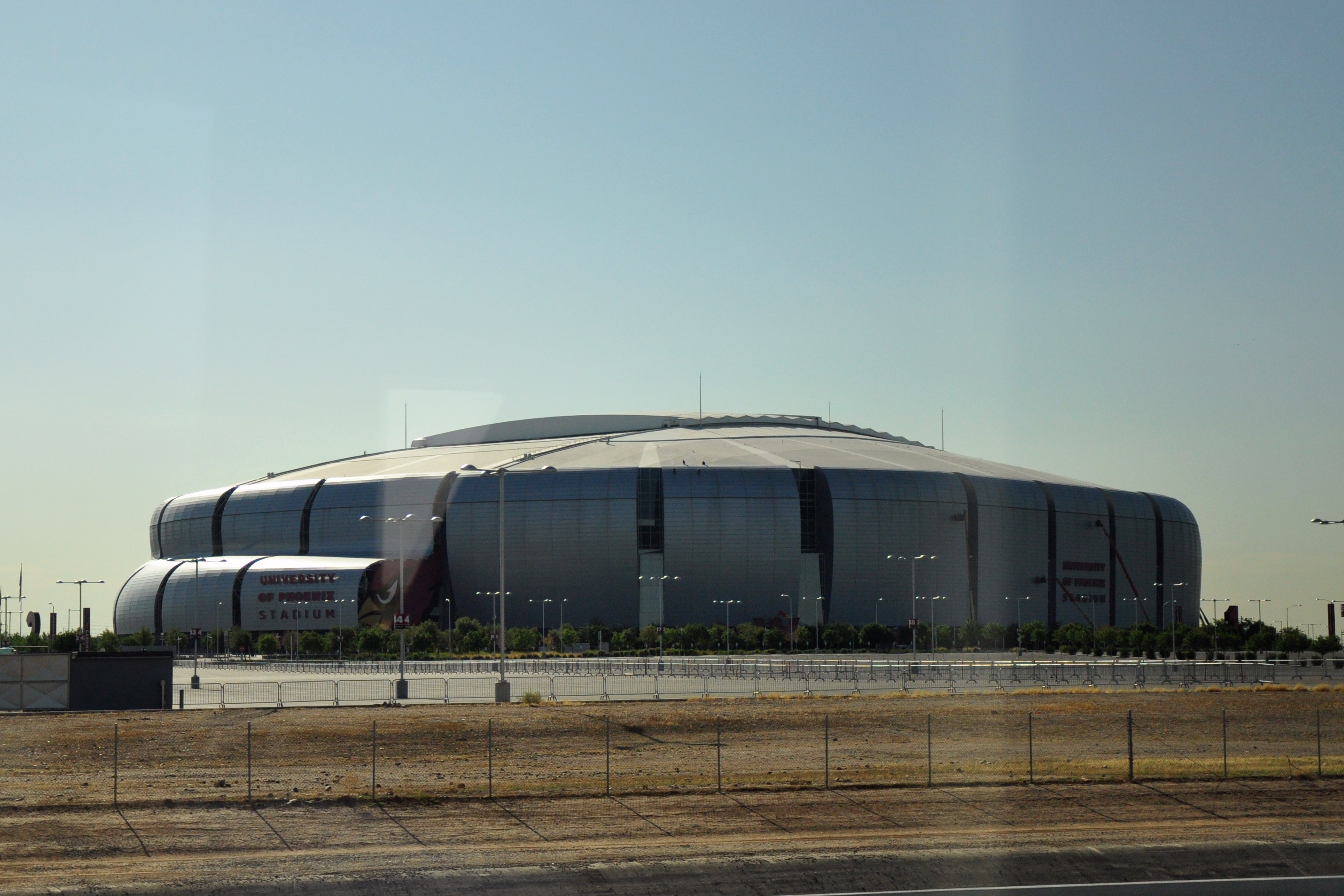
- University of Phoenix Stadium in Glendale, Arizona, hosted the Fiesta Bowl.
Ohio State Buckeyes	Texas Longhorns
(10–2)	(11–1)
Big Ten	Big 12
21	24
Head coach: Jim Tressel	Head coach: Mack Brown
AP / Coaches / BCS; 10 / 10 / 10	AP / Coaches / BCS; 3 / 3 / 3
	1	2	3	4	Total
Ohio State	3	3	0	15	21
Texas	0	3	14	7	24
- Date: January 5, 2009
- Season: 2008
- Stadium: University of Phoenix Stadium
- Location: Glendale, Arizona
- MVP: QB Colt McCoy, Texas (Offensive); DT Roy Miller, Texas (Defensive)
- Favorite: Texas by 10
- Referee: Dennis Hennigan (Big East)
- Attendance: 72,047
- Payout: US$17,500,000 per team

United States TV coverage
- Network: Fox
- Announcers: Matt Vasgersian, Tim Ryan, Chris Myers, Laura Okmin
- Nielsen ratings: 10.4 (17.1 million viewers)

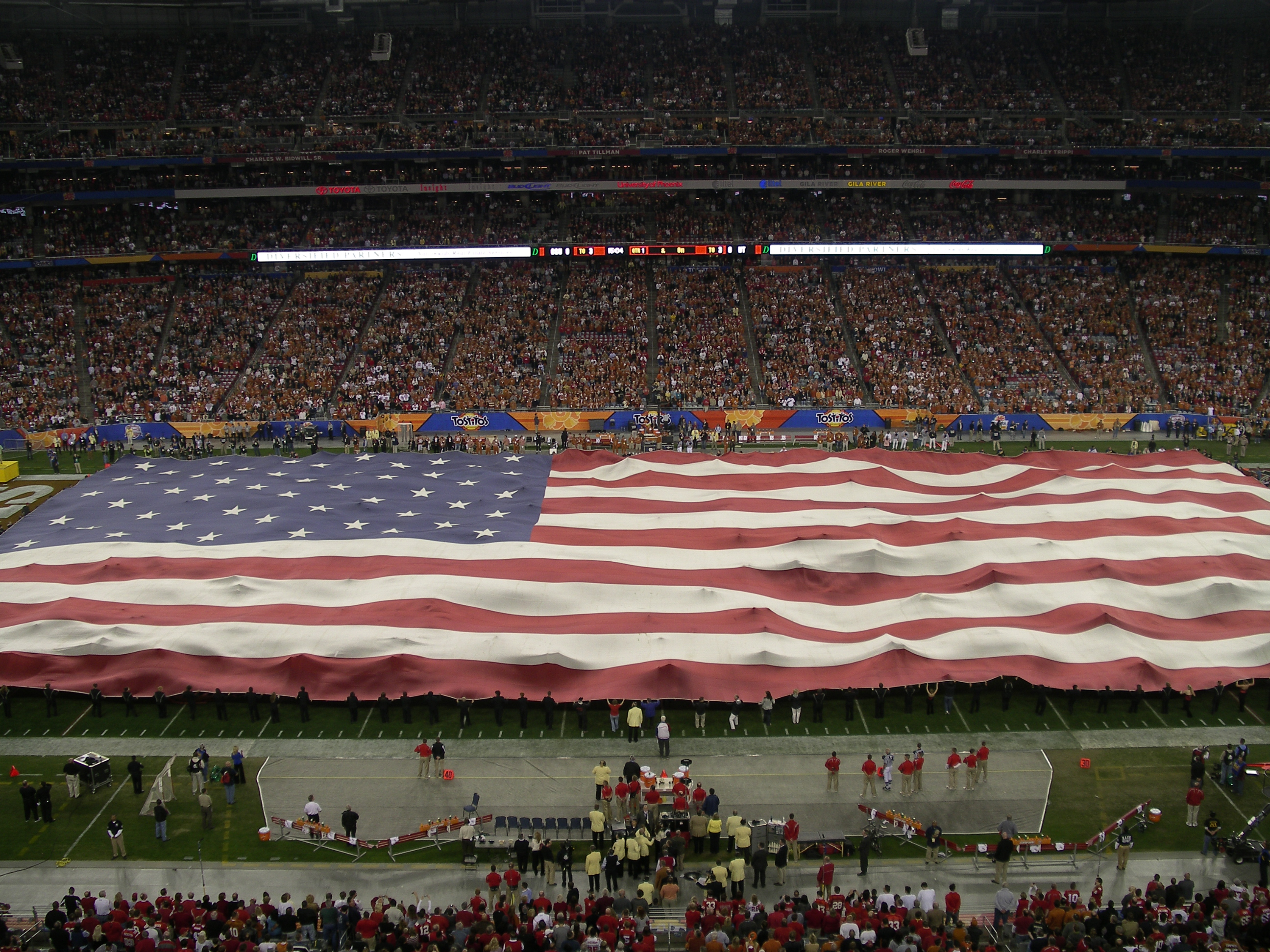
Pregame festivities at 2009 Fiesta Bowl

The 2009 Tostitos Fiesta Bowl game was a post-season college football bowl game between the Ohio State Buckeyes and the Texas Longhorns on Monday, January 5, 2009, at University of Phoenix Stadium in Glendale, Arizona. Texas participated in the Fiesta Bowl because the Big 12 champion University of Oklahoma Sooners were participating in the 2009 BCS National Championship Game; however the bowl kept its ties to the Big 12 by selecting the Longhorns, who did not play in the championship game as they beat Oklahoma in the Red River Rivalry, 45–35, then lost to Texas Tech and Texas Tech in turn lost to Oklahoma and dictated that a tiebreaker would decide that the highest BCS ranked team for the Big 12 South the week of November 28, 2008, would be in the title game. The Buckeyes were chosen as an at-large school as co-champions of the Big Ten Conference, having lost the right to play in the Rose Bowl due to a 13–6 loss to Penn State on October 25.

The Fiesta Bowl served as the penultimate contest of the 2008–2009 Bowl Championship Series (BCS) of the 2008 NCAA Division I FBS football season and was the concluding game of the season for both teams involved. This 38th edition of the Fiesta Bowl was televised in the United States on FOX. It was the third meeting in the history of the two schools.

The Longhorns (variously "Texas" or "UT" or the "Horns") were coached by head football coach Mack Brown and led on the field by quarterback Colt McCoy. The Buckeyes (variously "Ohio State" or "OSU" or the "Bucks") were coached by Jim Tressel and led on the field by Terrelle Pryor.

The victory by Texas gave Ohio State their third straight bowl loss, their longest such streak since the early John Cooper era (when they lost 4 bowls in a row from 1989 to 1992). This follows a four-game bowl winning streak which tied for longest in OSU history.

== Scoring summary ==
Scoring Play	Score
1st Quarter
OSU – Aaron Pettrey 51-yard FG, 7:28	OSU 3–0
2nd Quarter
Texas – Hunter Lawrence 27-yard FG, 11:45	Tie 3–3
OSU – Ryan Pretorius 30-yard FG, 5:39	OSU 6–3
3rd Quarter
Texas – Colt McCoy 14-yard TD run (Lawrence kick), 8:29	Texas 10–6
Texas – Quan Cosby 7-yard TD pass from McCoy (Lawrence kick), 1:04	Texas 17–6
4th Quarter
OSU – Pettrey 44-yard FG, 13:22	Texas 17–9
OSU – Terrelle Pryor 5-yard TD pass from Todd Boeckman (2-Pt Conversion failed), 7:26	Texas 17–15
OSU – Daniel Herron 15-yard TD run (2-Pt Conversion failed), 2:05	OSU 21–17
Texas – Cosby 26-yard TD pass from McCoy (Lawrence kick), :16	Texas 24–21

== The Ohio State and Texas football programs ==
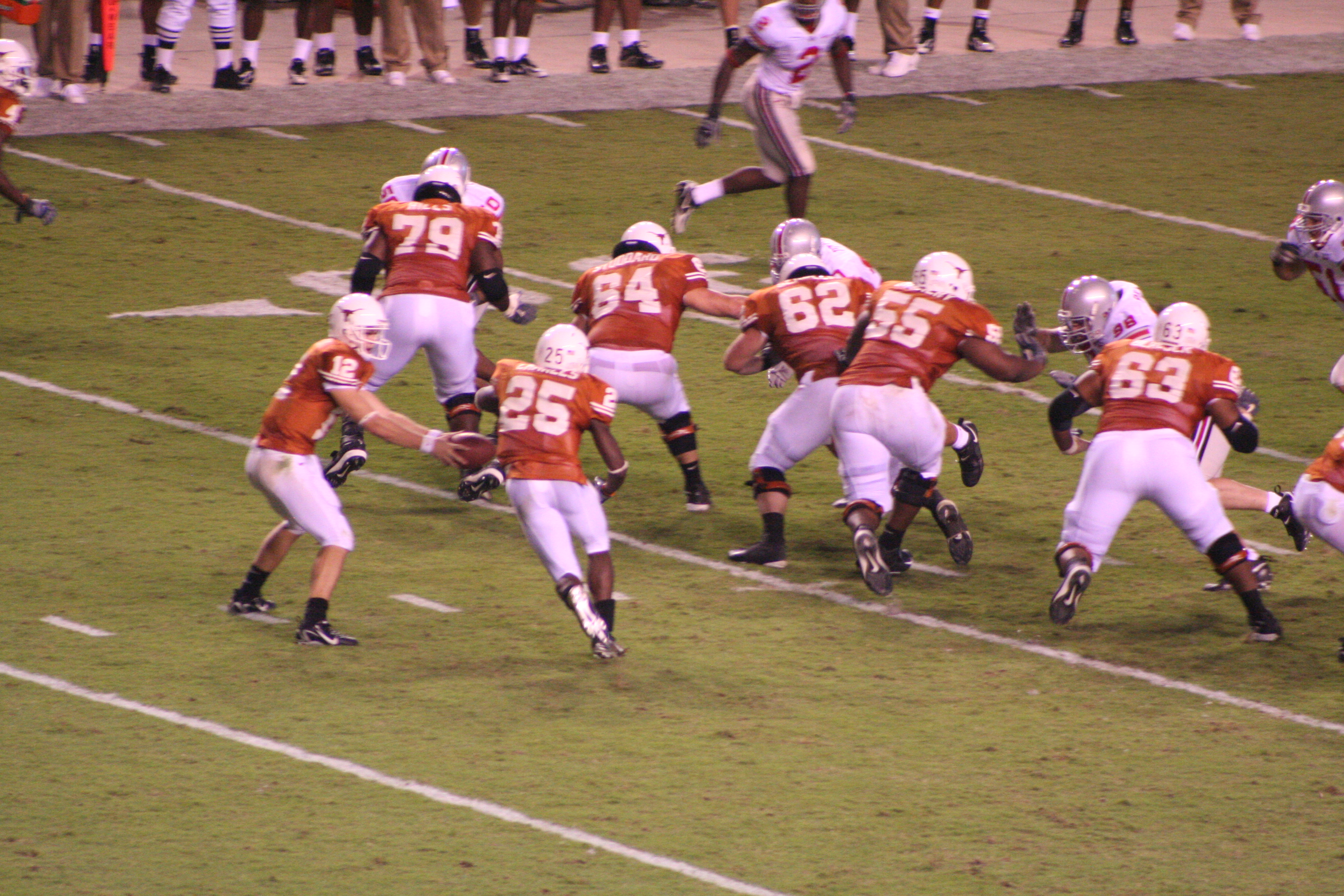
2006 Game: McCoy hands off to Jamaal Charles vs. Ohio State

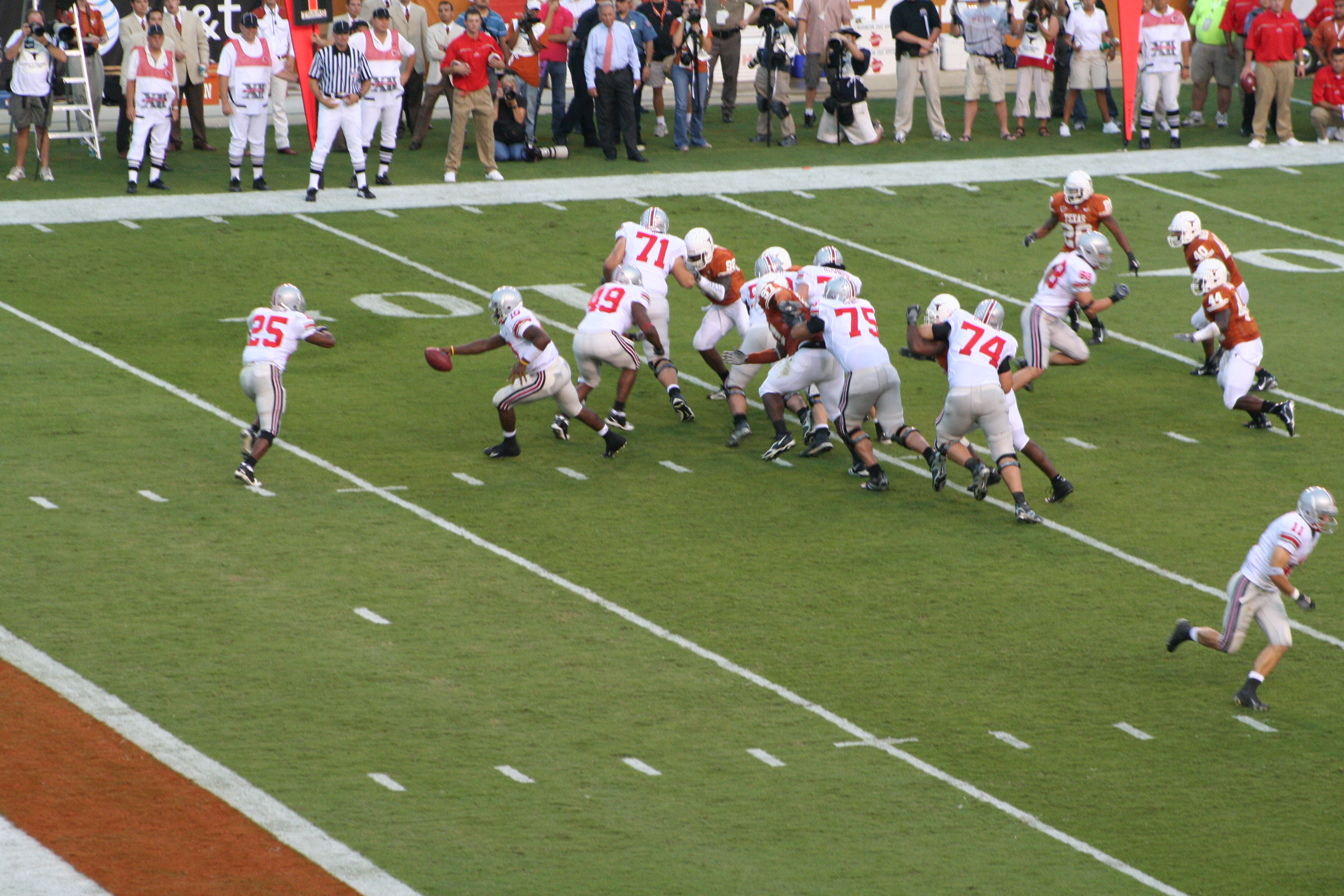
2006 Game: Ohio State's Troy Smith hands off to Antonio Pittman

The Ohio State Buckeyes and the Texas Longhorns are two of the most storied programs in college football. Before 2005 each school had participated in college football for more than 100 years. They are home to nationally known traditions from the Buckeye leaf stickers and the O-H-I-O chant at Ohio State to Bevo and the Hook 'em Horns of Texas.

One of the three most victorious programs in college football history as judged by either number of wins or winning percentage, the University of Texas has traditionally been considered a college football powerhouse. From 1936 to 2004, the team finished the season in the top ten 23 times, or one-third of the time, according to the Associated Press. The team that coach Mack Brown fielded in 2005 has been called one of the most memorable in college football history by College Football News.

Like the Longhorns, the Buckeyes are an elite football program. The Buckeyes program has produced 164 first-team All-American players, including seven Heisman Trophy winners. The Buckeyes rank fifth in college football history in terms of both total wins and winning percentage.

=== Previous meetings ===
Texas and Ohio State have two of the longest-running programs in college football, but they have played each other only twice. Texas won the 2005 game en route to winning their most recent national championship (in the process becoming the first visitor to win a night game at Ohio Stadium). In the 2006 game, which was won by Ohio State, OSU and Texas were ranked #1 and #2 respectively. It was only the 36th time that the top two teams in college football had ever faced each other outside of the BCS National Championship . OSU later played against #2 Michigan Wolverines in the Buckeyes' regular season finale.

== Leading into the game ==
After being passed over in the selection for the 2009 BCS National Championship Game, the Longhorns were selected to represent the Big 12 Conference as host team in the Fiesta Bowl. The Buckeyes were selected as an "at-large" school from among the eligible teams. The day the bowl bids were announced the sports betting line opened with Texas as ten-point favorites, the most of any of the 2009 BCS bowls.
