= Jim Bollman =

American football player and coach (born 1954)

Biographical details
- Born: December 1, 1954 (age 71); Ashtabula, Ohio, U.S.

Playing career
- 1972–1976: Ohio
- Position: Offensive lineman

Coaching career (HC unless noted)
- 1977: Miami (OH) (GA)
- 1978–1982: Miami (OH) (OL)
- 1983–1984: NC State (AHC/OL)
- 1985: NC State (AHC/LB)
- 1986–1988: Youngstown State (DC)
- 1989–1990: Youngstown State (OC)
- 1991–1994: Virginia (OL)
- 1995–1997: Michigan State (OL)
- 1998: Philadelphia Eagles (TE)
- 1999–2000: Chicago Bears (TE)
- 2001–2011: Ohio State (OC/OL)
- 2012: Boston College (OL/RGC)
- 2013–2019: Michigan State (OC/OL)

Jim Bollman (born December 1, 1954) is a retired American college football coach and former player. He is the former offensive line coach at Michigan State University, Prior to that he was the offensive line coach at Boston College from January 2012-February 27, 2013. Previously, Bollman served as the offensive coordinator and offensive line coach at Ohio State University from 2001 to 2011.

== Coaching career ==
=== Michigan State ===
Bollman accepted the offensive line coaching job at Purdue for the 2013 season, when he bolted to Michigan State to become their co-offensive coordinator. Bollman helped guide the Spartans to a 13–1 record, including a Big Ten Conference Championship and a Rose Bowl Game victory.
