= Vernon Gholston =

American football player (born 1986)

No. 56, 50
- Positions: Defensive end, linebacker

Personal information
- Born: June 5, 1986 (age 40); Detroit, Michigan, U.S.
- Listed height: 6 ft 3 in (1.91 m)
- Listed weight: 264 lb (120 kg)

Career information
- High school: Cass Technical (Detroit)
- College: Ohio State (2005–2007)
- NFL draft: 2008: 1st round, 6th overall pick

Career history
- New York Jets (2008–2010); Chicago Bears (2011)*; St. Louis Rams (2012)*
- * Offseason or practice squad member only

Awards and highlights
- Second-team All-American (2007); Big Ten Defensive Lineman of the Year (2007); First-team All-Big Ten (2007); Second-team All-Big Ten (2006)

Career NFL statistics
- Total tackles: 42
- Stats at Pro Football Reference

Vernon Gholston (born June 5, 1986) is an American former professional football player who was a defensive end and linebacker in the National Football League (NFL). He played college football for the Ohio State Buckeyes and was selected sixth overall by the New York Jets in the 2008 NFL draft. Gholston was also a member of the Chicago Bears and St. Louis Rams.

== Early life ==
As a senior at Cass Technical High School, Gholston emerged as one of the top prospects in the Midwest after registering 75 tackles, including six sacks, as a linebacker and also earning an All-State selection as an offensive guard.

== College career ==
Gholston attended Ohio State University, redshirting in 2005 after suffering a broken left hand in the season opener. In his freshman season he played defensive end, though recruited as a linebacker. He eventually moved up to the number 2 spot behind Mike Kudla.

In 2006, he earned Second-team All-Big Ten honors from both the league's coaches and the media while starting 13 games. Gholston had 49 tackles and his 18 tackles behind the line of scrimmage, which led the team, included 7.5 quarterback sacks, which ranked second on the team. He also intercepted his first pass in the win over Bowling Green.

On November 3, 2007, Gholston tied two Ohio State team records for quarterback sacks in a game when he dropped Wisconsin quarterback Tyler Donovan four times for a total loss of 32 yards. Two weeks later, he recorded three sacks against the Michigan Wolverines to lead Ohio State to its fourth consecutive win over the Wolverines. During the 2007 season, Gholston recorded 37 tackles (15.5 for a loss) and set a school record with 14 sacks in 13 games, breaking the former record of 13 sacks in a single season set in 1995 by Mike Vrabel. He was named All-America by Pro Football Weekly and was First-team All-Big Ten.

During his tenure at Ohio State, Gholston started 25 games. He finished with 87 tackles (47 solo) and 30.5 stops for a loss. He also had 22.5 sacks, which ranks sixth in school history.

=== College statistics ===
Year	GP	Tackles	For Loss	Sacks	Int	FF	FR
2005	5	1	0	0	0	0	0
2006	13	49	15	8.5	1	0	0
2007	13	37	15.5	14	0	0	1
Career	31	87	30.5	22.5	1	0	1

=== Awards and honors ===
National

- 2007 College Football All-America Team (Pro Football Weekly)

Conference

- 2007 Big Ten Conference Defensive Lineman of the Year (coaches)
- 2007 All-Big Ten Conference First-team (coaches and media)
- 2006 All-Big Ten Conference Second-team (coaches and media)

== Professional career ==
=== Pre-draft ===
Gholston declared for the 2008 NFL draft and was projected as a top 10 pick. He tied the highest bench press score at the NFL combine with 37 repetitions at 225 pounds (102 kg; 16.1 st). Gholston was one of two players to record a quarterback sack against two-time consensus All-American and 2008 NFL Draft number one overall selection Jake Long in Long's NCAA career. Gholston was invited to attend the 2008 NFL draft in New York. He drew comparisons to Kalimba Edwards.

Pre-draft measurables
Height	Weight	Arm length	Hand span	40-yard dash	10-yard split	20-yard split	20-yard shuttle	Three-cone drill	Vertical jump	Broad jump	Bench press	Wonderlic
6 ft 3 in (1.91 m)	266 lb (121 kg)	34 in (0.86 m)	10 in (0.25 m)	4.58 s	1.59 s	2.63 s	4.40 s	7.12 s	42 in (1.07 m)	10 ft 5 in (3.18 m)	37 reps	21
Vertical Jump and 40-yard dash (and splits) from Ohio State's Pro Day on March 7, 2008. All others from NFL Combine

=== New York Jets ===
Gholston was selected by the New York Jets in the first round with the sixth overall pick in the 2008 NFL draft. He was expected to play outside linebacker in the Jets' 3–4 defense with the Jets citing his speed, strength and "long limbs," believing they had found the perfect outside pass rusher for their defense. Gholston agreed to terms on a 5-year deal with the Jets on July 24, 2008, reportedly for $32 million, with $21 million guaranteed.

However, Gholston did not play much his rookie season after being expected to start. He saw time mainly on special teams, totalling 13 tackles, 5 solo. In his second year, During the 2009 season, he tallied 17 tackles (12 solo and 2 tackles for loss). Following the 2009 season, Gholston converted from outside linebacker to his more-familiar defensive end position.

Gholston was released by New York on March 2, 2011, after three seasons with the team.

=== Chicago Bears ===
Gholston was signed to a contract by the Chicago Bears on July 29, 2011. The Bears waived Gholston on August 29.

=== St. Louis Rams ===
The St. Louis Rams signed Gholston on August 22, 2012. The Rams waived Gholston on August 31.

=== NFL statistics ===
Year	Team	Games	Tackles	Solo	Assisted	Sacks	Forced fumbles	Fumble recoveries
2008	NYJ	15	13	5	8	0	0	0
2009	NYJ	14	17	12	5	0	0	0
2010	NYJ	16	12	7	5	0	0	0
Career		45	42	24	18	0	0	0

== Personal life ==
His younger cousin, William, was a defensive end for the Tampa Bay Buccaneers.
