= Aaron Pettrey =

American football player (born 1986)

No. 4, 14
- Position: Placekicker

Personal information
- Born: June 17, 1986 (age 40); Raceland, Kentucky, U.S.
- Listed height: 6 ft 2 in (1.88 m)
- Listed weight: 199 lb (90 kg)

Career information
- High school: Raceland
- College: Ohio State
- NFL draft: 2010: undrafted

Career history
- Carolina Panthers (2010)*; Detroit Lions (2010)*; Cincinnati Bengals (2010); Las Vegas Locomotives (2011); Cleveland Gladiators (2012–2014, 2017)
- * Offseason or practice squad member only

Awards and highlights
- Big 10 Champion (2006, 2007, 2008, 2009); Rose Bowl Game Champion (2010)

Career NFL statistics
- FGs made: 2
- FGs attempted: 4
- PATs made: 5
- PATs attempted: 5
- Stats at Pro Football Reference

Career AFL statistics
- FGs made: 14
- FGs attempted: 29
- PATs made: 227
- PATs attempted: 286
- Tackles: 9
- Stats at ArenaFan.com

Aaron Pettrey (born June 17, 1986) is an American former professional football player who was a placekicker in the National Football League (NFL) and Arena Football League (AFL). He played college football for the Ohio State Buckeyes. Pettrey was signed to the Cincinnati Bengals' roster on November 16, 2010, after a season-ending injury to Mike Nugent, another former Buckeye. Pettrey was waived by the Bengals on November 30, 2010. He was two for four on field goal attempts in two games.

== Early life ==
Pettrey attended Raceland–Worthington High School and served as quarterback and placekicker. In a September 26, 2003, game at Berea, Pettrey kicked a Kentucky state-record 58-yard field goal. This broke Middlesboro's Dustin Wynn's record of 57 yards, set on October 2, 1998, at Harlan.

== College career ==
Pettrey attended Ohio State University. During Pettrey's time at Ohio State, the Buckeyes played in two BCS National Championship Games in 2007 and 2008, won four Big 10 titles, and won a Rose Bowl Championship in 2010.

The 6–1, 202-pound Pettrey was 29-of-39 on field goal attempts during his Ohio State career, with a career-long of 54 yards. Pettrey also connected on 86-of-90 extra point attempts. A strong-legged kicker, Pettrey was 18-of-23 on field goal attempts over 40 yards, and delivered 56 career touchbacks as the Buckeyes' kickoff specialist in 2006 and 2008. (Pettrey was slowed by a hip flexor in '07)

In his final season in 2009, Pettrey handled all of the kicking duties, and was 14-of-20 on field goal attempts and 30-of-31 on extra points during a regular season that was cut short by a torn right MCL. Pettrey recovered quickly enough to kick for the Buckeyes in the Rose Bowl, converting from 45 yards out in the 26–17 win over Oregon.

== Professional career ==
=== Cincinnati Bengals ===
Pettrey kicked for the Cincinnati Bengals for two weeks, making 2 of 4 field goal attempts and converting all 5 PATs attempted.

=== Las Vegas Locomotives ===
Pettrey kicked for the Las Vegas Locomotives of the United Football League in 2011. After a 3 for 3 kicking performance in week one, Pettrey was named the UFL's Special Teams Player of the Week.

=== Cleveland Gladiators ===
==== 2012 season ====
Pettrey kicked for the Cleveland Gladiators of the Arena Football League in 2012.

==== 2013 season ====
With the Gladiators having kicking problems in 2013, Pettrey was assigned to the Gladiators and solidified the position. He was placed on injury reserve on July 11, 2013.

==== 2014 season ====
Pettrey had his most successful season to date for the Gladiators, making a career high 8 field goals and 106 PATs. He made 3 game-winning field goals, including a 36-yard shot against the Philadelphia Soul as time expired to advance to the American Conference Championship. Pettrey helped the Gladiators reach Arena Bowl XXVII.

On September 29, 2014, Pettrey was placed on reassignment by the Gladiators.

==== 2017 season ====
On June 14, 2017, Pettrey was assigned to the Gladiators.
