= Bob Tucker (coach) =

American football player and coach

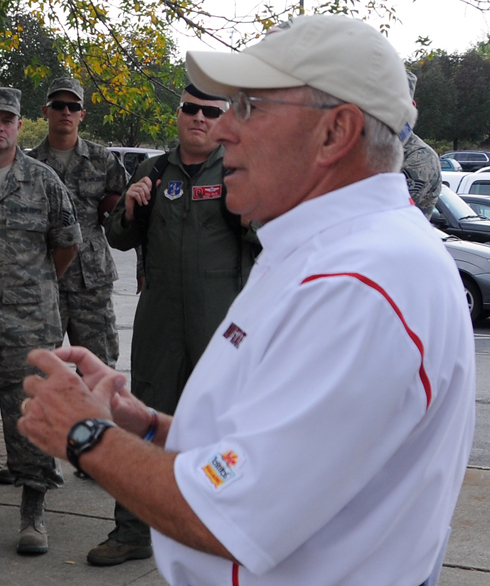
- Tucker in 2009

Biographical details
- Born: April 1, 1943; Sandusky, Ohio, U.S.
- Died: March 5, 2017 (aged 73); Worthington, Ohio, U.S.

Coaching career (HC unless noted)
- 1965–1966: Penn State (GA)
- 1967–1968: Massillon HS (OH) (assistant)
- 1969–1971: Wichita State (LB)
- 1972: Wichita State (DC/LB)
- 1973–1978: Iowa State (DE)
- 1979–1981: Ohio State (OL)
- 1982–1984: Ohio State (DC)
- 1985–1994: Wooster
- 1997–1999: Youngstown State (DC)
- 2000: Youngstown State (ST/LB)
- 2001–2008: Ohio State (dir. of operations)

Head coaching record
- Overall: 29–66–1

Bob Tucker (April 1, 1943 – March 5, 2017) was an American college football coach. He served as the head football coach at the College of Wooster from 1985 to 1994, compiling a record of 29–66–1.

== Head coaching record ==
Year	Team	Overall	Conference	Standing	Bowl/playoffs
Wooster Fighting Scots (North Coast Athletic Conference) (1985–1994)
1985	Wooster	3–6	2–4	T–4th	
1986	Wooster	4–5	3–3	4th	
1987	Wooster	5–4	3–3	T–3rd	
1988	Wooster	1–9	1–5	6th	
1989	Wooster	4–6	3–3	5th	
1990	Wooster	3–7	3–5	6th	
1991	Wooster	3–7	3–5	7th	
1992	Wooster	3–6–1	2–4–1	5th	
1993	Wooster	2–7	2–5	8th	
1994	Wooster	1–9	1–7	8th	
Wooster:		29–66–1	23–44–1		
Total:		29–66–1			
