= 2010 Ohio State Buckeyes football team =

American college football season

2010 Ohio State Buckeyes football

Big Ten co-champion (vacated) Sugar Bowl champion (vacated)

Sugar Bowl, W 31–26 vs. Arkansas (vacated)
- Conference: Big Ten Conference

Ranking
- Coaches: No. 5
- AP: No. 5
- Record: 0–1, 12 wins vacated (0–1 Big Ten, 7 wins vacated)
- Head coach: Jim Tressel (10th season)
- Offensive coordinator: Jim Bollman (10th season)
- Offensive scheme: Multiple
- Defensive coordinator: Jim Heacock (6th season)
- Co-defensive coordinator: Luke Fickell (6th season)
- Base defense: 4–3
- MVP: Dane Sanzenbacher
- Captain: 6: Cameron Heyward; Brian Rolle; Brandon Saine; Bryant Browning; Dane Sanzenbacher; Ross Homan
- Home stadium: Ohio Stadium

2010 Big Ten Conference football standings
	Conf.			Overall
Team	W		L	W		L
No. 14 Michigan State +	7	–	1	11	–	2
No. 7 Wisconsin $+	7	–	1	11	–	2
Iowa	4	–	4	8	–	5
Illinois	4	–	4	7	–	6
Penn State	4	–	4	7	–	6
Michigan	3	–	5	7	–	6
Northwestern	3	–	5	7	–	6
Purdue	2	–	6	4	–	8
Minnesota	2	–	6	3	–	9
Indiana	1	–	7	5	–	7
No. 5 Ohio State† %	0	–	1	0	–	1
$ – BCS representative as conference champion; % – BCS at-large representative; + – Conference co-champions; † – Ohio State (12–1, 7–1) self-vacated all of their wins; Rankings from AP Poll

The 2010 Ohio State Buckeyes football team represented Ohio State University in the 2010 NCAA Division I FBS football season. The Buckeyes were coached by Jim Tressel and played their home games in Ohio Stadium in Columbus, Ohio. They were members of the Big Ten Conference.

Ohio State vacated all 12 wins from 2010, including a vacated Sugar Bowl win (Arkansas, 31–26) due to NCAA violations. The Buckeyes are officially recorded as having finished the season 0–1, with the only game not vacated being a loss to Wisconsin.

On July 8, 2011, in the wake of NCAA violations for improper benefits to student athletes and the subsequent cover-up, Ohio State vacated all of its victories, as well as the co-conference and Sugar Bowl championships, from the 2010 season as self-imposed sanctions. Since then the athletes who received the improper benefits have called for the team's wins and records to be reinstated following changes in the NCAA's name, image and likeness rules in 2021, despite the NCAA stating that it had no plans to re-evaluate or reconsider any previous penalties related to those rules in July 2021. In May 2022 the Ohio House of Representatives adopted a non-unanimous symbolic resolution calling on the NCAA to reinstate the team's wins and records.

== Before the season ==
=== 2010 NFL draft ===
==== 2010 NFL Draft class ====
2010 NFL Draft selections
Round	Pick #	Team	Player	Position
4	18	Pittsburgh Steelers	Thaddeus Gibson	Defensive end
7	35	Pittsburgh Steelers	Doug Worthington	Defensive tackle
7	37	Philadelphia Eagles	Kurt Coleman	Strong safety
7	45	Miami Dolphins	Austin Spitler	Linebacker

==== Unsigned seniors ====
13 Amos, Andre CB 6-1 183 Sr. Middletown, Ohio (Middletown)

86 Ballard, Jake TE 6-6 256 Sr. Springboro, Ohio (Springboro) - UDFA: New York Giants

64 Cordle, Jim C 6-4 297 Sr. Lancaster, Ohio (Lancaster) - UDFA: New York Giants

92 Denlinger, Todd DL 6-2 292 Sr. Troy, Ohio (Troy)

33 Gantz, Joe RB 6-0 199 Sr. Wooster, Ohio (Wooster)

57 Ingham, Tom DE 6-1 243 Sr. Centerville, Ohio (Centerville)

66 Moses, Andrew OL 6-3 280 Sr. Dublin, Ohio (Bishop Watterson)

20 Pettrey, Aaron K 6-2 199 Sr. Raceland, Ky. (Raceland-Worthington)

83 Potokar, Dan WR 6-0 180 Sr. Grove City, Ohio (Grove City)

9 Rose, Robert DL 6-5 285 Sr. Cleveland, Ohio (Glenville) - UDFA: Miami Dolphins

21 Russell, Anderson DB 6-0 205 Sr. Atlanta, Ga. (Marist) - UDFA: Washington Redskins

82 Small, Ray WR 5-11 180 Sr. Cleveland, Ohio (Glenville) - UDFA: Indianapolis Colts via Minnesota Vikings

48 Thoma, Jon P 6-2 201 Sr. Louisville, Ohio (St. Thomas Aquinas)

24 Williams, Marcus RB 5-10 202 Sr. Ironton, Ohio (Ironton)

87 Wilson, Lawrence DL 6-4 274 Sr. Akron, Ohio (St. Vincent-St. Mary High School)

==== NFL Draft early entries ====
Thaddeus Gibson - Junior Redshirt Defensive End - Round: 4 / Pick: 116 - Pittsburgh Steelers

=== Transfers out ===
Lamaar Thomas - Sophomore Wide Receiver (New Mexico)

Rocco Pentello - Redshirt Sophomore Safety (Ashland)

Duron Carter - Sophomore Wide Receiver (Coffeyville Community College)

=== Recruiting class ===
College recruiting (2010)
Name	Hometown	School	Height	Weight	40^{‡}	Commit date
Darryl Baldwin; DE	Solon, OH	Solon	6 ft 6 in (1.98 m)	250 lb (110 kg)	4.7	Jul 19, 2009
Darryl Baldwin; DE	Recruit ratings: Scout: Rivals: (81)					
Drew Basil; K	Chillicothe, OH	Chillicothe	6 ft 2 in (1.88 m)	188 lb (85 kg)	-	Jul 2, 2009
Drew Basil; K	Recruit ratings: Scout: Rivals: (76)					
Corey Brown; ATH	Springfield, PA	Cardinal O'Hara	6 ft 0 in (1.83 m)	186 lb (84 kg)	4.5	Sep 13, 2009
Corey Brown; ATH	Recruit ratings: Scout: Rivals: (81)					
Christian Bryant; DB	Cleveland, OH	Glenville Academic Campus	5 ft 10 in (1.78 m)	173 lb (78 kg)	4.5	Jan 26, 2010
Christian Bryant; DB	Recruit ratings: Scout: Rivals: (78)					
David Durham; DE	Charlotte, NC	Christian	6 ft 3 in (1.91 m)	228 lb (103 kg)	4.7	Feb 23, 2009
David Durham; DE	Recruit ratings: Scout: Rivals: (79)					
Taylor Graham; QB	Wheaton, IL	Wheaton North	6 ft 4 in (1.93 m)	211 lb (96 kg)	-	Jun 23, 2009
Taylor Graham; QB	Recruit ratings: Scout: Rivals: (74)					
Adam Griffin; RB	Columbus, OH	DeSales	5 ft 9 in (1.75 m)	185 lb (84 kg)	-	Feb 11, 2010
Adam Griffin; RB	Recruit ratings: Scout: Rivals: (67)					
Chad Hagan; LB	Canonsburg, PA	Canon McMillan	6 ft 2 in (1.88 m)	230 lb (100 kg)	4.4	Aug 6, 2009
Chad Hagan; LB	Recruit ratings: Scout: Rivals: (75)					
Johnathon Hankins; DT	Detroit, MI	Southeastern	6 ft 3 in (1.91 m)	326 lb (148 kg)	5.1	Jan 5, 2010
Johnathon Hankins; DT	Recruit ratings: Scout: Rivals: (77)					
Carlos Hyde; RB	Fork Union, VA	Fork Union Military Academy	6 ft 1 in (1.85 m)	230 lb (100 kg)	-	Dec 8, 2009
Carlos Hyde; RB	Recruit ratings: Scout: Rivals: (79)					
James Louis; WR	Delray Beach, FL	Atlantic	5 ft 11 in (1.80 m)	178 lb (81 kg)	4.4	Jul 29, 2009
James Louis; WR	Recruit ratings: Scout: Rivals: (81)					
Scott McVey; LB	Cleveland, OH	St. Ignatius	5 ft 11 in (1.80 m)	215 lb (98 kg)	4.5	Apr 25, 2009
Scott McVey; LB	Recruit ratings: Scout: Rivals: (77)					
J.T. Moore; DE	Youngstown, OH	Boardman	6 ft 2 in (1.88 m)	220 lb (100 kg)	4.8	Nov 9, 2008
J.T. Moore; DE	Recruit ratings: Scout: Rivals: (78)					
Andrew Norwell; OL	Cincinnati, OH	Anderson	6 ft 7 in (2.01 m)	275 lb (125 kg)	-	Feb 4, 2009
Andrew Norwell; OL	Recruit ratings: Scout: Rivals: (80)					
Verlon Reed; ATH	Columbus, OH	Marion Franklin	6 ft 2 in (1.88 m)	185 lb (84 kg)	4.5	Feb 4, 2009
Verlon Reed; ATH	Recruit ratings: Scout: Rivals: (68)					
Bradley Roby; WR	Suwanee, GA	Peachtree Ridge	6 ft 0 in (1.83 m)	175 lb (79 kg)	4.4	Jan 13, 2010
Bradley Roby; WR	Recruit ratings: Scout: Rivals: (78)					
Roderick Smith; RB	Fort Wayne, IN	Harding	6 ft 3 in (1.91 m)	220 lb (100 kg)	4.5	Jul 1, 2009
Roderick Smith; RB	Recruit ratings: Scout: Rivals: (82)					
Jamel Turner; DE	Fork Union, VA	Fork Union Military Academy	6 ft 3 in (1.91 m)	210 lb (95 kg)	4.6	Dec 16, 2008
Jamel Turner; DE	Recruit ratings: Scout: Rivals: (79)					
Tyrone Williams; WR	East Cleveland, OH	Shaw	6 ft 7 in (2.01 m)	215 lb (98 kg)	4.5	Aug 29, 2009
Tyrone Williams; WR	Recruit ratings: Scout: Rivals: (79)					
Overall recruit ranking: Scout: 20 Rivals: 25 ESPN: 16
Note: In many cases, Scout, Rivals, 247Sports, On3, and ESPN may conflict in their listings of height and weight.; In these cases, the average was taken. ESPN grades are on a 100-point scale.; Sources: "Ohio State Football Commitments". Rivals.; "2010 Ohio State Football Commits". Scout.; "ESPN". ESPN.; "Scout.com Team Recruiting Rankings". Scout.; "2010 Team Ranking". Rivals.com.

=== Transfers in ===
None

== Schedule ==
Date	Time	Opponent	Rank	Site	TV	Result	Attendance
September 2	7:30 p.m.	Marshall*	No. 2	Ohio Stadium; Columbus, OH	BTN	W 45–7 (vacated)	105,040
September 11	3:30 p.m.	No. 12 Miami (FL)*	No. 2	Ohio Stadium; Columbus, OH	ESPN	W 36–24 (vacated)	105,454
September 18	12:00 p.m.	Ohio*	No. 2	Ohio Stadium; Columbus, OH	BTN	W 43–7 (vacated)	105,075
September 25	3:30 p.m.	Eastern Michigan*	No. 2	Ohio Stadium; Columbus, OH	ABC/ESPN	W 73–20 (vacated)	105,017
October 2	12:00 p.m.	at Illinois	No. 2	Memorial Stadium; Champaign, IL (Illibuck Trophy)	BTN	W 24–13 (vacated)	62,870
October 9	12:00 p.m.	Indiana	No. 2	Ohio Stadium; Columbus, OH	ESPN	W 38–10 (vacated)	105,291
October 16	7:00 p.m.	at No. 18 Wisconsin	No. 1	Camp Randall Stadium; Madison, WI (College GameDay)	ESPN	L 18–31	81,194
October 23	12:00 p.m.	Purdue^{†}	No. 11	Ohio Stadium; Columbus, OH	BTN	W 49–0 (vacated)	105,387
October 30	8:00 p.m.	at Minnesota	No. 10	TCF Bank Stadium; Minneapolis, MN	ABC	W 52–10 (vacated)	48,717
November 13	3:30 p.m.	Penn State	No. 8	Ohio Stadium; Columbus, OH (rivalry) (College GameDay)	ABC/ESPN	W 38–14 (vacated)	105,466
November 20	3:30 p.m.	at No. 21 Iowa	No. 8	Kinnick Stadium; Iowa City, IA	ABC	W 20–17 (vacated)	70,585
November 27	12:00 p.m.	Michigan	No. 8	Ohio Stadium; Columbus, OH (The Game)	ABC	W 37–7 (vacated)	105,491
January 4, 2011	8:30 p.m.	vs. No. 8 Arkansas*	No. 6	Louisiana Superdome; New Orleans, LA (Sugar Bowl) (College GameDay)	ESPN	W 31–26 (vacated)	73,879
*Non-conference game; ^{†}Homecoming; Rankings from AP Poll released prior to the game; All times are in Eastern time

== Regular season ==
=== Marshall ===
Marshall at #2 Ohio State

Team	1	2	3	4	Total
Marshall	7	0	0	0	7
• #2 Ohio State	21	14	7	3	45

- Date: September 2
- Location: Ohio Stadium
  Columbus, OH
- Game start: 7:30 p.m. EDT
- Elapsed time: 2:59
- Game attendance: 105,040
- Game weather: Partly Cloudy, 87 °F (31 °C), Wind SW 7 mph (11 km/h)
- Referee: Scott McElwee
- TV announcers (BTN): Eric Collins (Play-by-play), Chris Martin (Color) & Charissa Thompson (Sideline)

Scoring summary
1	13:42	OSU	DeVier Posey 6-yard pass from Terrelle Pryor (Devin Barclay kick)	OSU 7-0
1	10:27	OSU	Brandon Saine 4-yard run (Devin Barclay kick)	OSU 14-0
1	2:21	MARSH	Ahmed Shakoor 61-yard blocked field goal return (Tyler Warner kick)	OSU 14-7
1	1:22	OSU	Dane Sanzenbacher 65-yard pass from Terrelle Pryor (Devin Barclay kick)	OSU 21-7
2	3:49	OSU	Brandon Saine 45-yard run (Devin Barclay kick)	OSU 28-7
2	2:46	OSU	Brian Rolle 30-yard interception return (Devin Barclay kick)	OSU 35-7
3	10:17	OSU	DeVier Posey 11-yard pass from Terrelle Pryor (Devin Barclay kick)	OSU 42-7
4	7:28	OSU	Devin Barclay 34-yard field goal	OSU 45-7

In their first night game season opener since 2003, the Ohio State Buckeyes began the 2010 season playing the Marshall Thundering Herd. Ohio State worked early, recovering a fumble by Marshall on the opening kickoff and eventually scoring on a 6-yard pass from Terrelle Pryor less than two minutes into the game. After a Marshall three and out, the Buckeyes again worked quickly scoring another touchdown, and within the first five minutes of the game, Ohio State led Marshall 14–0. Marshall came back late in the first quarter with a field goal block and return by Ahmed Shakoor, closing the gap to one touchdown. However, after that touchdown, Ohio State took control heading into halftime. A 65-yard touchdown pass to Dane Sanzenbacher, a 45-yard run by Brandon Saine and an interception return with 2:58 to go in the second quarter, allowed the Buckeyes to go into halftime with 35-7 lead. With the start of the third quarter, Ohio State scored their final touchdown, an 11-yard pass to DeVier Posey. Pryor left the game in the middle of the fourth quarter along with many other starters. Devin Barclay hit a 34-yard field goal and ended the scoring of the Buckeyes. Ohio State won the game 45–7 (victory vacated), beginning their 2010 season with a record of 1–0.

=== Miami (FL) ===
#12 Miami (Florida) at #2 Ohio State

Team	1	2	3	4	Total
#12 Miami (FL)	7	10	0	7	24
• #2 Ohio State	3	23	10	0	36

- Date: September 11
- Location: Ohio Stadium
  Columbus, OH
- Game start: 3:40 p.m. EDT
- Elapsed time: 3:28
- Game attendance: 105,545
- Game weather: Partly Cloudy, 77 °F (25 °C), Wind SE 12 mph (19 km/h)
- Referee: Brad Allen
- TV announcers (ESPN): Brad Nessler (Play-by-play), Todd Blackledge (Color) & Holly Rowe (Sideline)

Ohio State entered their 2010 game against Miami (FL) with memories of the 2003 Fiesta Bowl in which Ohio State won their last national championship. The game began with good defense by both teams, with no points scored in the beginning of the 1st quarter. However, Devin Barclay broke the scoreless tie with a field goal late in the first quarter. Miami then ran back the kickoff following the field goal to give them the lead, which they would later add to with a field goal in the second quarter, giving them a 10–3 lead. Terrelle Pryor and the Buckeyes drove down the field and within three plays, scored a touchdown to tie the game. The second quarter saw plentiful scoring by both teams. After the Ohio State touchdown, the Buckeyes added a field goal and a touchdown by Dan Herron. Miami, after falling behind 20–10, returned a punt for a touchdown which brought them within three points. After two more field goals by Ohio State, the Buckeyes went into halftime with a 26–17 lead. Through interceptions by Jacory Harris the Buckeyes would score a touchdown and eventually get a field goal and head into the fourth quarter with a 36–17 lead. An early touchdown by Miami in the fourth quarter capped the scoring, with a final score of 36–24. (victory vacated) Ohio State continued their streak of winning games against ranked teams, now at five, going back to the 2009 season. Barclay tied an Ohio State record in the game, kicking five field goals.

1st Quarter

- OSU – (5:57) Barclay 24-yard field goal is GOOD. Drive: 7 plays, 18 yards, 2:42. (Buckeyes 3–0)
- MIA – (5:45) Miller 88-yard kickoff return, TOUCHDOWN. Bosher extra point is GOOD. (Hurricanes 7–3)

2nd Quarter

- MIA – (13:05) Bosher 51-yard field goal is GOOD. Drive: 7 plays, 19 yards, 1:58. (Hurricanes 10–3)
- OSU – (12:23) Saine 18-yard reception from Pryor, TOUCHDOWN. Barclay extra point is GOOD. Drive: 2 plays, 80 yards, 0:36. (10–10)
- OSU – (7:03) Barclay 41-yard field goal is GOOD. Drive: 10 plays, 36 yards, 3:01. (Buckeyes 13–10)
- OSU – (6:17) Herron 4-yard run, TOUCHDOWN. Barclay extra point is GOOD. Drive: 2 plays, 19 yards, 0:33. (Buckeyes 20–10)
- MIA – (3:04) Benjamin 79-yard punt return, TOUCHDOWN. Barclay extra point is GOOD. (Buckeyes 20–17)
- OSU – (1:01) Barclay 21-yard field goal is GOOD. Drive: 9 plays, 24 yards, 1:50. (Buckeyes 23–17)
- OSU – (0:01) Barclay 24-yard field goal is GOOD. Drive: 7 plays, 20 yards, 0:49. (Buckeyes 26–17)

3rd Quarter

- OSU – (10:16) Pryor 13-yard run, TOUCHDOWN. Barclay extra point is GOOD. Drive: 2 plays, 15 yards, 0:50. (Buckeyes 33–17)
- OSU – (1:29) Barclay 24-yard field goal is GOOD. Drive: 6 plays, 65 yards, 0:52. (Buckeyes 36–17)

4th Quarter

- MIA – (14:52) Ford 9-yard reception from Harris, TOUCHDOWN. Bosher extra point is GOOD. Drive: 7 plays, 60 yards, 1:37. (Buckeyes 36–24).

=== Ohio ===
Ohio at #2 Ohio State

Team	1	2	3	4	Total
Ohio	0	0	0	7	7
• #2 Ohio State	17	17	9	0	43

- Date: September 18
- Location: Ohio Stadium
  Columbus, OH
- Game start: 12:00 p.m. EDT
- Elapsed time: 2:57
- Game attendance: 105,075
- Game weather: Sunny, 73°F, Wind SW 7 mph (11 km/h)
- Referee: Dave Witvoet
- TV announcers (BTN): Eric Collins (Play-by-play), Chris Martin (Color) & Charissa Thompson (Sideline)

Ohio State entered the 2010 matchup with the Ohio Bobcats coming off an emotional victory over Miami (FL). Ohio State broke the game open with an early turnover which resulted in an Ohio State field goal. After a good defensive stop, Ohio State drove down the field again to score and gave the Buckeyes a 10–0 lead. Throughout the first half, Ohio turned over the ball and allowed Ohio State to receive good field position. By the end of the first quarter Ohio State led the game 17–0. Throughout the rest of the first half, Ohio State maintained their shut-out lead on the Bobcats, scoring a field goal and two touchdowns. Going into halftime, Ohio State held a 34–0 lead, their largest of the first three games of the season. Ohio State began subbing in second-string players throughout the second half. The Buckeyes scored a safety on a Cameron Heyward tackle. However, bad special teams play continued for the Buckeyes with a blocked punt late in the third quarter. Ohio was able to score a touchdown midway through the fourth quarter to give them their first points of the day. Ohio State continued their dominance in the early going of the season, beating Ohio 43–7 and moving to 3–0 (all subsequently vacated). Pryor set an Ohio State record by completing 16 consecutive passes.

1st Quarter

- OSU – (12:05) Barclay 32-yard field goal is GOOD. Drive: 5 plays, 16 yards, 2:06. (Buckeyes 3–0)
- OSU – (5:53) Saine 9-yard reception from Pryor, TOUCHDOWN. Barclay extra point is GOOD. Drive: 8 plays, 55 yards, 4:12. (Buckeyes 10–0)
- OSU – (3:11) Pryor 13-yard run, TOUCHDOWN. Barclay extra point is GOOD. Drive: 4 plays, 16 yards, 1:33. (Buckeyes 17–0)

2nd Quarter

- OSU – (13:17) Barclay 33-yard field goal is GOOD. Drive: 9 plays, 41 yards, 3:07. (Buckeyes 20–0)
- OSU – (10:25) Stoneburner 5-yard reception from Pryor, TOUCHDOWN. Barclay extra point is GOOD. Drive: 4 plays, 33 yards, 2:07. (Buckeyes 27–0)
- OSU – (8:22) Herron 2-yard run, TOUCHDOWN. Barclay extra point is GOOD. Drive: 3 plays, 40 yards, 1:13. (Buckeyes 34–0)

3rd Quarter

- OSU – (6:09) Davidson tackled in the end zone, SAFETY. (Buckeyes 36–0)
- OSU – (0:41) Herron 1-yard run, TOUCHDOWN. Barclay extra point is GOOD. Drive: 10 plays, 55 yards, 5:28. (Buckeyes 43–0)

4th Quarter

- OHIO – (6:14) McCrae 11-yard reception from Jackson, TOUCHDOWN. Weller extra point is GOOD. Drive: 9 plays, 61 yards, 5:42. (Buckeyes 43–7)

=== Eastern Michigan ===
Eastern Michigan at #2 Ohio State

Team	1	2	3	4	Total
Eastern Michigan	0	14	6	0	20
• #2 Ohio State	24	14	14	21	73

- Date: September 25
- Location: Ohio Stadium
  Columbus, OH
- Game start: 3:30 p.m. EDT
- Elapsed time: 3:22
- Game attendance: 105,017
- Game weather: Sunny, 73 °F (23 °C), Wind W 13 mph (21 km/h)
- Referee: Bill LeMonnier
- TV announcers (ABC/ESPN): Carter Blackburn (Play-by-play), Brock Huard (Color) & Mike Bellotti (Color)

Ohio State played their fourth consecutive home game against the Eastern Michigan Eagles ending their 2010 non-conference schedule. Ohio State scored early and often, with Terrelle Pryor rushing for a touchdown and connecting with Dane Sanzenbacher for another in the first quarter, and also adding points with a Dan Herron rushing touchdown and a Devin Barclay field goal, putting the Buckeyes up 24–0 at the end of the first quarter. In the second, the Eagles scored twice on a Dwayne Priest run and a touchdown pass by Alex Gillett to Kinsman Thomas. However Ohio State responded, and Sanzenbacher caught two more passes from Pryor for touchdowns, and at the end of the first half the Buckeyes led 38–14. The second half saw the Buckeyes pull away, scoring five more touchdowns including another Pryor-to-Sanzenbacher connection, and redshirt freshman Jaamal Berry's first collegiate touchdown. The end of the third quarter saw the Ohio State second and third string players enter the game. However, Jim Tressel and the Buckeyes did not relent. In the end Buckeyes won the rout 73–20, the most points scored by Ohio State in 60 years and the most ever by a team coached by Jim Tressel. Sanzenbacher tied an Ohio State record with four touchdown receptions. Pryor had six touchdowns on the day; four passing, one rushing, and one receiving. Ohio State ended their 2010 non-conference schedule with a record of 4–0 (all subsequently vacated), staying in the national championship hunt.

1st Quarter

- OSU – (13:04) Pryor 53-yard run, TOUCHDOWN. Barclay extra point is GOOD. Drive: 3 plays, 56 yards, 1:04. (Buckeyes 7–0)
- OSU – (10:55) Sanzenbacher 31-yard reception from Pryor, TOUCHDOWN. Barclay extra point is GOOD. Drive: 3 plays, 65 yards, 0:58. (Buckeyes 14–0)
- OSU – (6:41) Barclay 42-yard field goal is GOOD. Drive: 3 plays, 6 yards, 1:03. (Buckeyes 17–0)
- OSU – (0:30) Herron 7-yard run, TOUCHDOWN. Barclay extra point is GOOD. Drive: 10 plays, 65 yards, 5:06. (Buckeyes 24–0)

2nd Quarter

- EMU – (10:47) Priest 2-yard run, TOUCHDOWN. Graham extra point is GOOD. Drive: 9 plays, 75 yards, 4:43. (Buckeyes 24–7)
- OSU – (7:44) Sanzenbacher 9-yard reception from Pryor, TOUCHDOWN. Barclay extra point is GOOD. Drive: 8 plays, 68 yards, 3:03. (Buckeyes 31–7)
- OSU – (4:18) Sanzenbacher 7-yard reception from Pryor, TOUCHDOWN. Barclay extra point is GOOD. Drive: 6 plays, 57 yards, 1:51. (Buckeyes 38–7)
- EMU – (0:59) Thomas 13-yard reception from Gillett, TOUCHDOWN. Graham extra point is GOOD. Drive: 7 plays, 73 yards, 3:19. (Buckeyes 38–14)

3rd Quarter

- OSU – (12:34) Sanzenbacher 8-yard reception from Pryor, TOUCHDOWN. Barclay extra point is GOOD. Drive: 9 plays, 57 yards, 2:01. (Buckeyes 45–14)
- EMU – (9:11) Scott 32-yard reception from Gillett, TOUCHDOWN. Graham extra point is BLOCKED. Drive: 6 plays, 80 yards, 3:23. (Buckeyes 45–20)
- OSU – (2:57) Pryor 20-yard reception from Hall, TOUCHDOWN. Barclay extra point is GOOD. Drive: 5 plays, 66 yards, 1:38. (Buckeyes 52–20)

4th Quarter

- OSU – (13:44) Hall 17-yard reception from Bauserman, TOUCHDOWN. Barclay extra point is GOOD. Drive: 7 plays, 50 yards, 2:31. (Buckeyes 59–20)
- OSU – (8:39) Berry 67-yard run, TOUCHDOWN. Barclay extra point is GOOD. Drive: 5 plays, 94 yards, 1:57. (Buckeyes 66–20)
- OSU – (3:26) Guiton 15-yard run, TOUCHDOWN. Barclay extra point is GOOD. Drive: 6 plays, 60 yards, 3:27. (Buckeyes 73–20)

=== Illinois ===
#2 Ohio State at Illinois

Team	1	2	3	4	Total
• #2 Ohio State	7	7	0	10	24
Illinois	7	3	0	3	13

- Date: October 2
- Location: Memorial Stadium
  Champaign, IL
- Game start: 12:00 p.m. EDT
- Elapsed time: 2:57
- Game attendance: 62,870
- Game weather: Cloudy, 53 °F (12 °C), Wind NE 10 mph (16 km/h)
- Referee: Scott McElwee
- TV announcers (BTN): Eric Collins (Play-by-play), Chris Martin (Color) & Charissa Thompson (Sideline)

The Ohio State Buckeyes began their Big Ten schedule with their first road game of the year, against the Illinois Fighting Illini. Illinois began the scoring with a quarterback run by Nathan Scheelhaase. Ohio State answered with an 8-yard touchdown pass from Terrelle Pryor to Brandon Saine, and the teams were tied at 7 after the first quarter. In the second, Derek Dimke hit a 27-yard field goal for the Fighting Illini to give them a 10–7 lead, but Ohio State came back with a touchdown reception by Dane Sanzenbacher. Pryor was briefly knocked from the game with a leg injury, and though he returned, he was limited for the rest of the game. Illinois closed the gap to four points, but Ohio State clinched the win with a touchdown run by Dan Herron late in the fourth quarter, and defeated Illinois 24–13 (victory vacated), retaining the Illibuck trophy.

1st Quarter

- ILL – (8:29) Scheelhaase 3-yard run, TOUCHDOWN. Dimke extra point is GOOD. Drive: 9 plays, 5 yards, 4:27. (Fighting Illini 7–0)
- OSU – (6:17) Saine 8-yard reception from Pryor, TOUCHDOWN. Barclay extra point is GOOD. Drive: 4 plays, 74 yards, 2:12. (7–7)

2nd Quarter

- ILL – (1:50) Dimke 27-yard field goal GOOD. Drive: 5 plays, 14 yards, 2:50. (Fighting Illini 10–7)
- OSU – (0:45) Sanzenbacher 11-yard reception from Pryor, TOUCHDOWN. Barclay extra point is GOOD. Drive: 5 plays, 57 yards, 1:05. (Buckeyes 14–10)

4th Quarter

- OSU – (8:27) Barclay 32-yard field goal is GOOD. Drive: 13 plays, 59 yards, 7:52. (Buckeyes 17–10)
- ILL – (4:36) Dimke 30-yard field goal is GOOD. Drive: 8 plays, 67 yards, 3:51. (Buckeyes 17–13)
- OSU – (1:49) Herron 6-yard run, TOUCHDOWN. Barclay extra point is GOOD. Drive: 6 plays, 53 yards, 2:47. (Buckeyes 24–13)

=== Indiana ===
Indiana at #2 Ohio State

Team	1	2	3	4	Total
Indiana	0	0	3	7	10
• #2 Ohio State	14	17	7	0	38

- Date: October 9
- Location: Ohio Stadium
  Columbus, OH
- Game start: 12:00 p.m. EDT
- Elapsed time: 3:07
- Game attendance: 105,291
- Game weather: Sunny, 70 °F (21 °C), Wind W 1 mph (1.6 km/h)
- Referee: Todd Geerlings
- TV announcers (ESPN): Dave Pasch (Play-by-play), Bob Griese (Color) & Chris Spielman (Color)

In their second Big Ten conference matchup of the 2010 season, the #2 ranked Ohio State Buckeyes faced the Indiana Hoosiers. From the beginning of the game, Ohio State opened up on the run following Terrelle Pryor's injury in the previous game. Dan Herron scored on a 39-yard touchdown run within the first five minutes of the game, which began a first half of many scores for Ohio State. Pryor connected with one of the most productive quarterback-to-wide receiver combos in 2010 with a touchdown pass to Dane Sanzenbacher. Entering the second quarter, Ohio State led the Indiana Hoosiers 14–0. However, the Buckeyes were not done scoring and quickly scored on Brandon Saine 60-yard touchdown run, and a touchdown pass from Pryor to DeVier Posey. With the seconds in the first half winding down, Ohio State connected on a field goal by Devin Barclay to extend their halftime lead to 31–0. With the beginning of the second half Ohio State scored after a defensive stop, a touchdown pass to Herron, Ohio State's last score of the day. Indiana overcame the Ohio State defense with the second-string coming into the game. Indiana scored on a field goal late in the third quarter and a touchdown in the fourth. Ohio State won the game 38–10, extending their winning streak and moving to 6–0 (0–0 after victories were vacated). This would have been coach Jim Tressel's 100th win at Ohio State.

1st Quarter

- OSU – (13:03) Herron 39-yard run, TOUCHDOWN. Barclay extra point is GOOD. Drive: 4 plays, 71 yards, 1:57. (Buckeyes 7–0)
- OSU – (6:35) Sanzenbacher 22-yard reception from Pryor, TOUCHDOWN. Barclay extra point is GOOD. Drive: 3 plays, 33 yards, 0:56. (Buckeyes 14–0)

2nd Quarter

- OSU – (13:31) Saine 60-yard reception from Pryor, TOUCHDOWN. Barclay extra point is GOOD. Drive: 4 plays, 77 yards, 1:53. (Buckeyes 21–0)
- OSU – (6:55) Posey 17-yard reception from Pryor, TOUCHDOWN. Barclay extra point is GOOD. Drive: 5 plays, 31 yards, 2:27. (Buckeyes 28–0)
- OSU – (0:46) Barclay 36-yard field goal is GOOD. Drive: 9 plays, 74 yards, 2:28. (Buckeyes 31–0)

3rd Quarter

- OSU – (8:02) Herron 8-yard run, TOUCHDOWN. Barclay extra point is GOOD. Drive: 10 plays, 66 yards, 4:58. (Buckeyes 38–0)
- IND – (4:50) Ewald 36-yard field goal is GOOD. Drive: 7 plays, 41 yards, 3:07. (Buckeyes 38–3)

4th Quarter

- IND – (5:06) Banks 1-yard run, TOUCHDOWN. Ewald extra point is GOOD. Drive: 9 plays, 52 yards, 4:51. (Buckeyes 38–10)

=== Wisconsin ===
#1 Ohio State at #18 Wisconsin

Team	1	2	3	4	Total
#1 Ohio State	0	3	7	8	18
• #18 Wisconsin	14	7	0	10	31

- Date: October 16
- Location: Camp Randall Stadium
  Madison, WI
- Game start: 7:00 p.m. EDT
- Elapsed time: 2:59
- Game attendance: 81,194
- Game weather: Clear, 70 °F (21 °C), Wind W 8 mph (13 km/h)
- Referee: Dan Capron
- TV announcers (ESPN): Brent Musburger (Play-by-play), Kirk Herbstreit (Color) & Erin Andrews (Sideline)

The top ranked Ohio State Buckeyes entered the 2010 matchup with the #18 Wisconsin Badgers, hoping to build on 6–0 record. Jim Tressel entered the game 4–3 against Wisconsin, having won three consecutive matchups. However, there were signs of trouble in all of them; in 2007, the Buckeyes trailed 17-10 on their home field before defense and special teams sparked an eventual Ohio State win. In 2008, the Buckeyes needed an interception on Wisconsin's final drive, when Wisconsin had a chance to win or tie the game down 20-17. In 2009, a hideous offensive performance by the Buckeyes led to the Badgers dominating Ohio State on offense, but a pair of defensive touchdowns and a kick return for a score saved the Buckeyes from being upset on their home field.

Trouble began for the Buckeyes on the opening kickoff; David Gilreath sprinted 97 yards for a touchdown to give the Badgers a 7-0 lead. Offensively, the Buckeyes struggled early with no real production on drives throughout the first quarter. With the Wisconsin defense clamping down and the Badger offense successfully running the ball on Ohio State's defense, Wisconsin jumped out to a 21–0 lead midway through the second quarter via a pair of John Clay touchdown carries. Buckeye LB Andrew Sweat intercepted Wisconsin QB Scott Tolzien, but the Ohio State offense was stopped on the Wisconsin goal-line and had to settle for a field goal. On a later drive into Wisconsin territory, a missed field goal by Ohio State kicker Devin Barclay kept the score 21–3 at the end of the first half.

The Buckeyes drove down the field on their first drive of the second half and scored on a 13-yard run by RB Dan Herron, making the score 21–10. A stop by the Ohio State defense led to another touchdown drive by the Buckeyes, who scored on another Dan Herron touchdown. Ohio State converted the ensuing two-point conversion, which brought the Buckeyes within three points of a tie, the score being 21–18 Wisconsin. However, Badger QB Scott Tolzien led the Badgers on a long drive, punctuated by a 12-yard touchdown run by James White, making the score 28–18 in favor of Wisconsin. After another unsuccessful drive by Ohio State, the Badgers added a field goal to their lead, making the score 31–18. On Ohio State's final drive of the game, Terrelle Pryor threw an interception to Wisconsin LB Blake Sorensen to seal the huge Wisconsin upset. The loss snapped Jim Tressel's 3-game winning streak against Wisconsin from 2007 to 2009 and dropped Tressel to 4–4 against Wisconsin overall.

1st Quarter

- WIS – (14:48) Gilreath 97-yard kickoff return, TOUCHDOWN. Welch extra point is GOOD. (Badgers 7–0)
- WIS – (10:00) Clay 14-yard run, TOUCHDOWN. Welch extra point is GOOD. Drive: 6 plays, 58 yards, 2:47. (Badgers 14–0)

2nd Quarter

- WIS – (13:15) Clay 1-yard run, TOUCHDOWN. Welch extra point is GOOD. Drive: 19 plays, 89 yards, 10:04. (Badgers 21–0)
- OSU – (6:48) Barclay 21-yard field goal is GOOD. Drive: 12 plays, 64 yards, 6:27. (Badgers 21–3)

3rd Quarter

- OSU – (10:08) Herron 13-yard run, TOUCHDOWN. Barclay extra point is GOOD. Drive: 10 plays, 77 yards, 4:52. (Badgers 21–10)

4th Quarter

- OSU – (11:38) Herron 1-yard run, TOUCHDOWN. Pryor pass to Fragel for two-point conversion is GOOD. Drive: 19 plays, 94 yards, 9:56. (Badgers 21–18)
- WIS – (6:57) White 12-yard run, TOUCHDOWN. Welch extra point is GOOD. Drive: 10 plays, 73 yards, 4:41. (Badgers 28–18)
- WIS – (4:14) Welch 41-yard field goal is GOOD. Drive: 6 plays, 44 yards, 2:09. (Badgers 31–18)

=== Purdue ===
Purdue at #10 Ohio State

Team	1	2	3	4	Total
Purdue	0	0	0	0	0
• #10 Ohio State	14	28	0	7	49

- Date: October 23
- Location: Ohio Stadium
  Columbus, OH
- Game start: 12:00 p.m. EDT
- Elapsed time: 2:52
- Game attendance: 105,387
- Game weather: Cloudy, 59 °F (15 °C), Wind SW 6 mph (9.7 km/h)
- Referee: Dennis Lipski
- TV announcers (BTN): Eric Collins (Play-by-play), Chris Martin (Color) & Charissa Thompson (Sideline)

Following a loss to the Wisconsin Badgers the previous week, the 6–1 Ohio State Buckeyes entered the game placed second in the Big Ten and facing a team in the Purdue Boilermakers who accomplished an upset victory over the Buckeyes in 2009. Within the first five minutes of the ballgame, Ohio State jumped out to an early 7–0 lead on the Boilermakers with a Dan Herron 10-yard touchdown run. Another Herron run would give the Buckeyes a 14–0 lead at the end of the first quarter. Defensive stops and a good running and passing game gave the Buckeyes an advantage heading into the second quarter where Jordan Hall scored a touchdown run, and DeVier Posey, Dane Sanzenbacher, and Corey Brown all received touchdown receptions from quarterback Terrelle Pryor. At halftime of this homecoming game, Ohio State held a commanding 42–0 lead. Both teams exchanged possessions throughout the third and fourth quarter with the Ohio State second and third string players entering the game. In the middle of the fourth quarter, backup quarter Joe Bauserman completed a touchdown reception to make the final score of the ballgame 49–0 (victory vacated). The Buckeyes pounded Purdue on offense, and the 2010 Buckeye defense pitched their first shutout of the season.

1st Quarter

- OSU – (13:05) Herron 10-yard run, TOUCHDOWN. Barclay extra point is GOOD. Drive: 5 plays, 60 yards, 1:55. (Buckeyes 7–0)
- OSU – (6:48) Herron 2-yard run, TOUCHDOWN. Barclay extra point is GOOD. Drive: 6 plays, 39 yards, 2:35. (Buckeyes 14–0)

2nd Quarter

- OSU – (14:25) Hall 1-yard run, TOUCHDOWN. Barclay extra point is GOOD. Drive: 11 plays, 91 yards, 5:12. (Buckeyes 21–0)
- OSU – (4:57) Posey 22-yard reception from Pryor, TOUCHDOWN. Barclay extra point is GOOD. Drive: 6 plays, 61 yards, 3:23. (Buckeyes 28–0)
- OSU – (1:54) Sanzenbacher 7-yard reception from Pryor, TOUCHDOWN. Barclay extra point is GOOD. Drive: 3 plays, 76 yards, 1:19. (Buckeyes 35–0)
- OSU – (0:36) Brown 15-yard reception from Pryor, TOUCHDOWN. Barclay extra point is GOOD. Drive: 5 plays, 40 yards, 1:06. (Buckeyes 42–0)

4th Quarter

- OSU – (7:24) Smith 23-yard reception from Bauserman, TOUCHDOWN. Barclay extra point is GOOD. Drive: 10 plays, 67 yards, 6:01. (Buckeyes 49–0)

=== Minnesota ===
#11 Ohio State at Minnesota

Team	1	2	3	4	Total
• #11 Ohio State	14	17	7	14	52
Minnesota	7	0	3	0	10

- Date: October 30
- Location: TCF Bank Stadium
  Minneapolis, MN
- Game start: 8:00 p.m. EDT
- Elapsed time: 3:05
- Game attendance: 48,717
- Game weather: Clear, 46 °F (8 °C), Wind NNE 12 mph (19 km/h)
- Referee: Dave Witvoet
- TV announcers (ABC): Mike Patrick (Play-by-play), Craig James (Color) & Ray Bentley (Sideline)

With the Ohio State Buckeyes struggling through their prior two away games of the season, Ohio State entered the 2010 matchup against the Minnesota Golden Gophers hoping to stay on top of the Big Ten race. Like the previous games, Ohio State started slow with the offense driving down the field in five minutes and the Minnesota offense countering the attack with a touchdown of their own. On their second possession, Ohio State drove down the field on another time consuming drive scoring on a Brandon Saine reception from Terrelle Pryor. With the game staying close throughout the first quarter, Ohio State began to slowly pull away after a missed field goal on Minnesota's second drive. The second quarter saw the Buckeyes score on a 23-yard field goal, a Dan Herron touchdown run, and a DeVier Posey 38-yard reception. At halftime, Ohio State led the rout of Minnesota by a score of 31–7. Minnesota opened up the second half with a long drive down the field and a field goal, making the game a 31–10 affair with Ohio State holding the lead. From the middle of the third quarter on, it was all the Buckeyes. A blocked punt recovered in the end zone for a touchdown and a Jordon Hall touchdown run brought the Ohio State lead to 45–10. The game finished off with the backups coming in for Ohio State and another defensive touchdown. The final score of the game was 52–10 bringing Ohio State to an 8–1 record on the season (0–1 after victories were vacated) and 4–1 record in the Big Ten (0–1 with vacated victories), keeping them in the Big Ten race.

1st Quarter

- OSU – (9:25) Pryor 1-yard run, TOUCHDOWN. Barclay extra point is GOOD. Drive: 11 plays, 46 yards, 5:35. (Buckeyes 7–0)
- MINN – (7:44) Eskridge 7-yard run, TOUCHDOWN. Ellestad extra point is GOOD. Drive: 4 plays, 74 yards, 1:41. (7–7)
- OSU – (0:22) Saine 3-yard reception from Pryor, TOUCHDOWN. Barclay extra point is GOOD. Drive: 13 plays, 92 yards, 7:22. (Buckeyes 14–7)

2nd Quarter

- OSU – (8:24) Barclay 23-yard field goal is GOOD. Drive: 7 plays, 74 yards, 3:49. (Buckeyes 17–7)
- OSU – (1:43) Herron 10-yard run, TOUCHDOWN. Barclay extra point is GOOD. Drive: 6 plays, 62 yards, 3:11. (Buckeyes 24–7)
- OSU – (0:24) Posey 38-yard reception from Pryor, TOUCHDOWN. Barclay extra point is GOOD. Drive: 2 plays, 47 yards, 0:12. (Buckeyes 31–7)

3rd Quarter

- MINN – (11:12) Ellestad 33-yard field goal is GOOD. Drive: 8 plays, 44 yards, 3:48. (Buckeyes 31–10)
- OSU – (4:10) Domicone blocked punt recovery in end zone, TOUCHDOWN. Barclay extra point is GOOD. (Buckeyes 38–10)

4th Quarter

- OSU – (11:17) Hall 16-yard run, TOUCHDOWN. Barclay extra point is GOOD. Drive: 6 plays, 49 yards, 3:00. (Buckeyes 45–10)
- OSU – (10:16) Simon 30-yard fumble return, TOUCHDOWN. Barclay extra point is GOOD. (Buckeyes 52–10)

=== Penn State ===
Penn State at #9 Ohio State

Team	1	2	3	4	Total
Penn State	7	7	0	0	14
• #9 Ohio State	3	0	14	21	38

- Date: November 13
- Location: Ohio Stadium
  Columbus, OH
- Game start: 3:30 p.m. EST
- Elapsed time: 3:05
- Game attendance: 105,466
- Game weather: Clear, 70 °F (21 °C), Wind S 9 mph (14 km/h)
- Referee: Bill LeMonnier
- TV announcers (ABC/ESPN): Brent Musburger (Play-by-play), Kirk Herbstreit (Color) & Erin Andrews (Sideline)

Following an off week, the #9-ranked Ohio State Buckeyes took the field against their rivals in the Penn State Nittany Lions. The game began with a good first drive by the Buckeyes, who on 7 plays got down to the Penn State goal line; however they were only able to get a field goal out of the drive. It would be Penn State who would dominate the Buckeye defense and the field for the rest of the first half. Penn State responded quickly halfway through the first quarter, scoring on a McGloin touchdown, giving Penn State the lead. During the second quarter, an early touchdown pass from McGloin to Moye gave Penn State a 14–3 lead and eyeing an upset as they headed to halftime with the same score. Following the touchdown with 11 minutes in the second quarter, Penn State was shut out by the Buckeye defense. The Ohio State team which came out in the beginning of the third quarter was very different from the team that went in at halftime. The Ohio State offense caught fire and scored a touchdown midway through the third quarter and scored another touchdown on a Devon Torrence interception for a touchdown. Ohio State began pulling away in the fourth quarter on a catch by Dane Sanzenbacher and an interception returned for a touchdown. A Jake Stoneburner reception for a touchdown ended the scoring by both teams and made the final score 38–14 in favor of the Ohio State Buckeyes (victory vacated).

1st quarter

- OSU – (11:36) Barclay 26-yard field goal. Drive: 7 plays, 71 yards, 3:24. (Buckeyes 3–0)
- PSU – (4:10) Brown 23-yard reception from McGloin, TOUCHDOWN. Wagner extra point is GOOD. Drive: 10 plays, 67 yards, 4:23. (Nittany Lions 7–3)

2nd Quarter

- PSU – (11:23) Moye 6-yard reception from McGloin, TOUCHDOWN. Wagner extra point is GOOD. Drive: 11 plays, 82 yards, 6:03. (Nittany Lions 14–3)

3rd Quarter

- OSU – (6:33) Herron 5-yard run, TOUCHDOWN. Barclay extra point is GOOD. Drive: 11 plays, 96 yards, 5:34. (Nittany Lions 14–10)
- OSU – (4:29) Torrence 34-yard interception return, TOUCHDOWN. Barclay extra point is GOOD. (Buckeyes 17–14)

4th Quarter

- OSU – (9:58) Sanzenbacher 58-yard reception from Pryor, TOUCHDOWN. Barclay extra point is GOOD. Drive: 2 plays, 45 yards, 1:13. (Buckeyes 24–14)
- OSU – (8:57) Howard 30-yard interception return, TOUCHDOWN. Barclay extra point is GOOD. (Buckeyes 31–14)
- OSU – (3:59) Stoneburner 3-yard reception from Pryor, TOUCHDOWN. Barclay extra point is GOOD. (Buckeyes 38–14)

=== Iowa ===
#9 Ohio State at #20 Iowa

Team	1	2	3	4	Total
• #9 Ohio State	0	3	7	10	20
#20 Iowa	7	0	3	7	17

- Date: November 20
- Location: Kinnick Stadium
  Iowa City, IA
- Game start: 3:30 p.m. EST
- Elapsed time: 3:09
- Game attendance: 70,585
- Game weather: Clear, 40 °F (4 °C), Wind E 15 mph (24 km/h)
- Referee: John O'Neill
- TV announcers (ABC): Sean McDonough (Play-by-play), Matt Millen (Color) & Quint Kessenich (Sideline)

Scoring summary
1	1:05	IOWA	Marvin McNutt 19-yard pass from Ricky Stanzi (Michael Meyer kick)	IOWA 7–0
2	11:34	OSU	Devin Barclay 18-yard field goal	IOWA 7–3
3	8:36	OSU	Reid Fragel 5-yard pass from Terrelle Pryor (Devin Barclay kick)	OSU 10–7
3	3:26	IOWA	Michael Meyer 31-yard field goal	Tied 10–10
4	11:53	IOWA	Marcus Coker 1-yard run (Michael Meyer kick)	IOWA 17–10
4	7:38	OSU	Devin Barclay 48-yard field goal	IOWA 17–13
4	1:47	OSU	Dan Herron 1-yard run (Devin Barclay kick)	OSU 20–17

The #9 Ohio State Buckeyes met the #20 Iowa Hawkeyes which the Buckeyes had to win to keep in the Big Ten championship race. The Hawkeye defense shut down the Buckeyes until the second quarter. It would be Ricky Stanzi who drove down the field for the first score of the game, giving the Hawkeyes a 7–0 lead on Senior Day. The Buckeyes still struggled to move the ball as they were only able to score an 18-yard field goal, their only points of the first half. A defensive game was set up as the two teams went to halftime with Iowa holding a 7–3 lead. The Buckeyes scored their first touchdown on their second possession of the third quarter with a Terrelle Pryor touchdown reception giving the Buckeyes their first lead of the game, 10–7. Iowa countered the score with a field goal bringing the game back to a tie heading into the fourth quarter. A Pryor interception gave way to an Iowa touchdown midway through the fourth quarter and the Hawkeyes taking control of the game with a 17–10 lead. The Buckeyes were only able to score on a 48-yard field goal, shortening Iowa's led to four points. With a defensive stop by the Buckeyes, it was up to the Ohio State offensive to make a comeback to win the game. On 4th and 10, it was Terrelle Pryor who would give Ohio State life by running for the 1st down, which kept a good drive alive. Ohio State ended up scoring on a Dan Herron run and took the lead 20-17 with less than two minutes in the game. Following a defensive stop, the Buckeyes were able to win the ballgame and keep themselves in the Big Ten championship race (victories and share of Big Ten title vacated).

=== Michigan ===
Michigan at #8 Ohio State

Team	1	2	3	4	Total
Michigan	0	7	0	0	7
• #8 Ohio State	0	24	13	0	37

- Date: November 27
- Location: Ohio Stadium
  Columbus, OH
- Game start: 12:00 p.m. EST
- Elapsed time: 3:10
- Game attendance: 105,491
- Game weather: 35 °F (2 °C), Partly Cloudy, NW 13 mph (21 km/h)
- Referee: Dennis Lipski
- TV announcers (ABC): Sean McDonough (Play-by-play), Matt Millen (Color) & Quint Kessenich (Sideline)

Scoring summary
2	14:52	OSU	Devin Barclay 33-yard field goal	OSU 3–0
2	12:29	OSU	Dane Sanzenbacher 7-yard pass from Terrelle Pryor (Devin Barclay kick)	OSU 10–0
2	8:02	MICH	Michael Shaw 1-yard run (Brendan Gibbons kick)	OSU 10–7
2	7:50	OSU	Jordan Hall 85-yard kickoff return (Devin Barclay kick)	OSU 17–7
2	3:06	OSU	DeVier Posey 33-yard pass from Terrelle Pryor (Devin Barclay kick)	OSU 24–7
3	12:25	OSU	Dan Herron 32-yard run (Devin Barclay kick)	OSU 31–7
3	9:12	OSU	Devin Barclay 36-yard field goal	OSU 34–7
3	1:08	OSU	Devin Barclay 23-yard field goal	OSU 37–7

The Buckeyes ended their regular season against their archrivals, the Michigan Wolverines. Ohio State wore uniforms that paid tribute to the 1942 national championship team, which was honored before the game.

After a scoreless first quarter in which Michigan's defense proved more resilient than expected, the Buckeyes broke through first on a 33-yard field goal by Devin Barclay. Ohio State added to their lead with Terrelle Pryor's seven-yard touchdown pass to Dane Sanzenbacher. The Wolverines closed the gap to 10–7 on Michael Shaw's 1-yard run, but Jordan Hall returned the ensuing kickoff 85 yards, and the Buckeyes remained in control. They added two more touchdowns and two more field goals, and Ohio State trounced Michigan 37–7 (victory vacated).

With the win, the Buckeyes finished the season at 11–1, clinching a share of the Big Ten title. This season marked the 6th consecutive season in which Ohio State won or tied for the conference lead. The Buckeyes also set a new school mark with their seventh consecutive victory against the Wolverines, the longest streak for Ohio State since the rivalry was first played in 1897. Buckeyes head coach Jim Tressel was 9–1 against Michigan (8–1 after the victory was vacated).

After the 2010 season, an NCAA investigation was launched into rules violations by Ohio State, which included allegations that Buckeyes head coach Jim Tressel knowingly played ineligible players during several 2010 games, including the Michigan game. The NCAA investigation, which resulted in Tressel's resignation, is ongoing and may lead to sanctions, including vacating Ohio State's 2010 victory over Michigan. For this reason, the Columbus Dispatch reported in May 2011 that Ohio State had delayed the award of its traditional "gold pants" charms for the 2010 victory over Michigan.

== 2011 Sugar Bowl ==
=== Arkansas ===
#6 Ohio State vs. #8 Arkansas

Team	1	2	3	4	Total
• #6 Ohio State	14	14	3	0	31
#8 Arkansas	7	3	11	5	26

- Date: January 4
- Location: Louisiana Superdome
  New Orleans, LA
- Game start: 8:30 p.m. EST
- Elapsed time: 3:19
- Game attendance: 73,879
- Game weather: Domed Stadium
- Referee: Jeff Flanagan
- TV announcers (ESPN): Brad Nessler (Play-by-play), Todd Blackledge (Color) & Holly Rowe (Sideline)

Scoring summary
1	11:41	OSU	Dane Sanzenbacher recovered fumble in end zone (Devin Barclay kick)	OSU 7-0
1	9:43	ARK	Joe Adams 17-yard pass from Ryan Mallett (Zach Hocker kick)	Tied 7-7
1	7:17	OSU	Dan Herron 9-yard run (Devin Barclay kick)	OSU 14-7
2	9:53	OSU	Dane Sanzenbacher 15-yard pass from Terrelle Pryor (Devin Barclay kick)	OSU 21-7
2	1:59	OSU	DeVier Posey 43-yard pass from Terrelle Pryor (Devin Barclay kick)	OSU 28-7
2	0:00	ARK	Zach Hocker 20-yard field goal	OSU 28-10
3	9:14	ARK	Zach Hocker 46-yard field goal	OSU 28-13
3	4:10	OSU	Devin Barclay 46-yard field goal	OSU 31-13
3	0:58	ARK	Jarius Wright 22-yard pass from Ryan Mallett (Ryan Mallett to D.J. Williams pass)	OSU 31-21
4	11:52	ARK	Safety, Dan Herron tackled by Jake Bequette in end zone	OSU 31-23
4	8:55	ARK	Zach Hocker 47-yard field goal	OSU 31-26

The Ohio State Buckeyes headed to the Superdome to take on the Arkansas Razorbacks. The Buckeyes came into the game 0-9 against the SEC in bowl games. The Buckeyes struck first, with Dane Sanzenbacher recovering a fumble in the end zone after Terrelle Pryor fumbled on the 3-yard line. Immediately following the score, Jim Tressel took a gamble and attempted an on-side kick that Arkansas recovered at the 50-yard line. With a short field, Arkansas struck back with Ryan Mallett connecting with Joe Adams on a 17-yard pass. Dan Herron added a 9-yard run, and Sanzenbacher and DeVier Posey caught touchdown passes of 15 and 43 yards respectively to give the Buckeyes a big lead. Zach Hocker hit a 20-yard field goal as time expired and the Razorbacks were down 28-10 at the half.

In the third quarter, Hocker and Devin Barclay traded field goals, and then the momentum shifted towards Arkansas. Mallett connected with Jarius Wright for a touchdown, then made the two-point conversion on a pass to D. J. Williams to pull within ten. The Razorbacks closed the gap further in the fourth, on a safety by Jake Bequette and another field goal by Hocker. With just over a minute left, Arkansas blocked Ohio State's punt and recovered on the 18-yard line. However, Mallett's first pass was incomplete and then his next pass was intercepted. The Buckeyes then ran out the clock and won, 31-26. This was Ohio State's first bowl win over an SEC opponent, but it was later vacated, along with all the regular season victories, due to NCAA violation.

== Rankings ==
Ranking movements Legend: ██ Increase in ranking ██ Decrease in ranking ( ) = First-place votes
	Week															
Poll	Pre	1	2	3	4	5	6	7	8	9	10	11	12	13	14	Final
AP	2 (3)	2 (4)	2 (5)	2 (5)	2 (2)	2 (1)	1 (34)	11	10	8	8	8	8	6	6	5
Coaches	2 (4)	2 (4)	2 (4)	2 (3)	2 (2)	2 (1)	1 (49)	10	10	8	7	7	7	6	6	5
Harris	Not released						1 (79)	10	10	8	7	7	8	6	6	Not released
BCS	Not released							10	11	11	9	9	8	6	6	Not released

== After the season ==
Ohio State entered the 2010 season as the #2 ranked team in the nation with expectations high on winning a sixth straight Big Ten championship, and possibly a national championship. Ohio State began the season 6-0 and was eventually ranked #1 in the nation following an Alabama loss. However, Wisconsin defeated the Buckeyes and gave them their first and only loss of the season. While the loss put an end to Ohio State's national championship hopes, the Buckeyes were still able to capture a sixth straight conference championship and win a seventh straight victory over arch-rival Michigan. This allowed Ohio State to earn a BCS berth in the Sugar Bowl where they defeated the Arkansas Razorbacks to win their second consecutive BCS bowl. The 2010 Buckeyes finished the season 12-1 and 7-1 in conference play, as well as finishing ranked #5 in both the AP and Coaches poll.

The first five games of the season would be played without the participation of five players: Terrelle Pryor, Devier Posey, Mike Adams, Solomon Thomas, and Boom Herron were part of a scandal that involved selling memorabilia to the owner of a Columbus tattoo parlor. On March 8, 2011, it was reported that Tressel knew about it as early as April 2010 through an anonymous e-mail message. As of result, Tressel received a two-game suspension for failing to notify authorities of the players' wrongdoings. Tressel later decided to sit out the first five games in order to allow him to face the adversity with the five players. On May 30, 2011, Tressel tendered his resignation from the head coaching position. Assistant head coach Luke Fickell, who was to take over during Tressel's suspension, was named interim head coach. On June 8, returning starting Quarterback Terrelle Pryor announced his intention to forgo his senior season, "in the best interest of [his] teammates," in light of his suspension and ongoing investigation by the NCAA.

=== 2011 NFL Draft class ===
2011 NFL Draft selections
Round	Pick #	Team	Player	Position
1	31	Pittsburgh Steelers	Cameron Heyward	Defensive end
4	16	Oakland Raiders	Chimdi Chekwa	Cornerback
5	27	St. Louis Rams	Jermale Hines	Safety
6	28	Philadelphia Eagles	Brian Rolle	Linebacker
6	35	Minnesota Vikings	Ross Homan	Linebacker

== Personnel ==
=== Roster ===
2010 Ohio State Buckeyes roster
Quarterbacks: 2 Terrelle Pryor – junior; 13 Ken Guiton – freshman; 14 Joe Bauserman – junior; 17 Justin Siems – freshman; Running backs: 1 Dan Herron – junior; 3 Brandon Saine – senior; 4 Jaamal Berry – freshman; 7 Jordon Hall – sophomore; 26 Carlos Hyde – freshman; 35 Bo DeLande – junior; 37 James Georgiades – sophomore; 41 Jermil Martin – sophomore; 44 Zach Boren – sophomore; 49 Adam Homan – sophomore; Wide receivers: 10 Corey Brown – freshman; 5 Taurian Washington – senior; 8 DeVier Posey – junior; 9 Duron Carter – sophomore; 11 Jake Stoneburner – sophomore; 12 Dane Sanzenbacher – senior; 15 James Jackson – sophomore; 17 Grant Schwartz – senior; 80 Chris Fields – freshman; 81 Ricky Crawford – senior; 83 Joe Cech – sophomore; 84 Josh Springer – senior; 85 Tony Harlamert – freshman; 87 Chris Roark – sophomore; 89 Garrett Hummel – senior; Tight ends: 81 Nic DiLillo – sophomore; 88 Reid Fragel – sophomore	Offensive line: 50 Michael Brewster – junior; 55 Andy Miller – senior; 57 Chris Malone – senior; 59 Sam Longo – freshman; 65 Justin Boren – senior; 68 Evan Blankenship – junior; 70 Bryant Browning – senior; 71 Corey Linsley – freshman; 72 Scott Sika – senior; 74 Jack Mewhort – freshman; 75 Mike Adams – junior; 76 J.B. Shugarts – junior; 77 Connor Smith – senior; 79 Marcus Hall – sophomore; Defensive line: 43 Nathan Williams – junior; 53 Garrett Goebel – sophomore; 54 John Simon – sophomore; 55 Jonathan Newsome – sophomore; 56 Dalton Britt – sophomore; 62 Jon Lorenz – sophomore; 67 Cavin Green – freshman; 72 Dexter Larimore – senior; 91 Melvin Fellows – freshman; 91 Stewart Smith – sophomore; 92 Todd Denlinger – senior; 92 William McCary – sophomore; 93 Adam Bellamy – freshman; 94 Keith Wells – sophomore; 95 Don Matheney – senior; 97 Cameron Heyward – senior; 98 Solomon Thomas – junior	Linebackers: 6 Etienne Sabino – junior; 11 Dorian Bell – freshman; 32 Storm Klein – sophomore; 35 James Hastings – freshman; 36 Brian Rolle – senior; 39 Jordan Whiting – freshman; 41 Tony Jackson – junior; 42 Andrew Sweat – junior; 48 Dan Bain – junior; 51 Ross Homan – senior; 73 Josh Kerr – senior; Defensive backs: 1 Devon Torrence – senior; 3 Corey Brown – freshman; 5 Chimdi Chekwa – senior; 7 Jermale Hines – senior; 14 C.J. Barnett – sophomore; 16 Zach Domicone – sophomore; 18 Travis Howard – sophomore; 19 Orhian Johnson – sophomore; 23 Jamie Wood – freshman; 25 Vincent Petrella – sophomore; 28 Dominic Clarke – sophomore; 29 Chris Maxwell – sophomore; 29 Taylor Rice – sophomore; 30 Donnie Evege – junior; 34 Nate Ebner – sophomore; Safeties: 8 Aaron Grant – senior; 15 Nate Oliver – junior; 26 Tyler Moeller – senior	Punters: 17 Ben Buchanan – sophomore; 39 Derek Erwin – sophomore; Kickers: 12 Devin Barclay – senior; Long snappers: 56 George Makridis – freshman; 60 Garrett Dornbrook – sophomore; 96 Jake McQuaide – senior

=== Coaching staff ===
Name	Title	First year in this position	Years at Ohio State	Alma mater
Jim Tressel	Head coach	2001	1983–1985, 2001–2011	Baldwin-Wallace
Jim Heacock	Defensive coordinator	2005	1996–present	Muskingum
Jim Bollman	Offensive coordinator Offensive line	2001	2001–present	Ohio
Luke Fickell	Co-defensive coordinator Linebacker Coach	2004, 2005	1999, 2002–present	Ohio State
Paul Haynes	Safeties	2005	2005–present	Kent State
Darrell Hazell	Assistant head coach Wide receivers	2004, 2005	2004–present	Muskingum
Taver Johnson	Cornerbacks	2007	2007–present	Wittenberg
John Peterson	Tight ends	2004	1993–1994, 2004–present	Ohio State
Nick Siciliano	Quarterbacks	2009	2005–present	Youngstown State
Dick Tressel	Running backs	2004	2001–present	Baldwin-Wallace
