= Dan Herron =

American football player (born 1989)

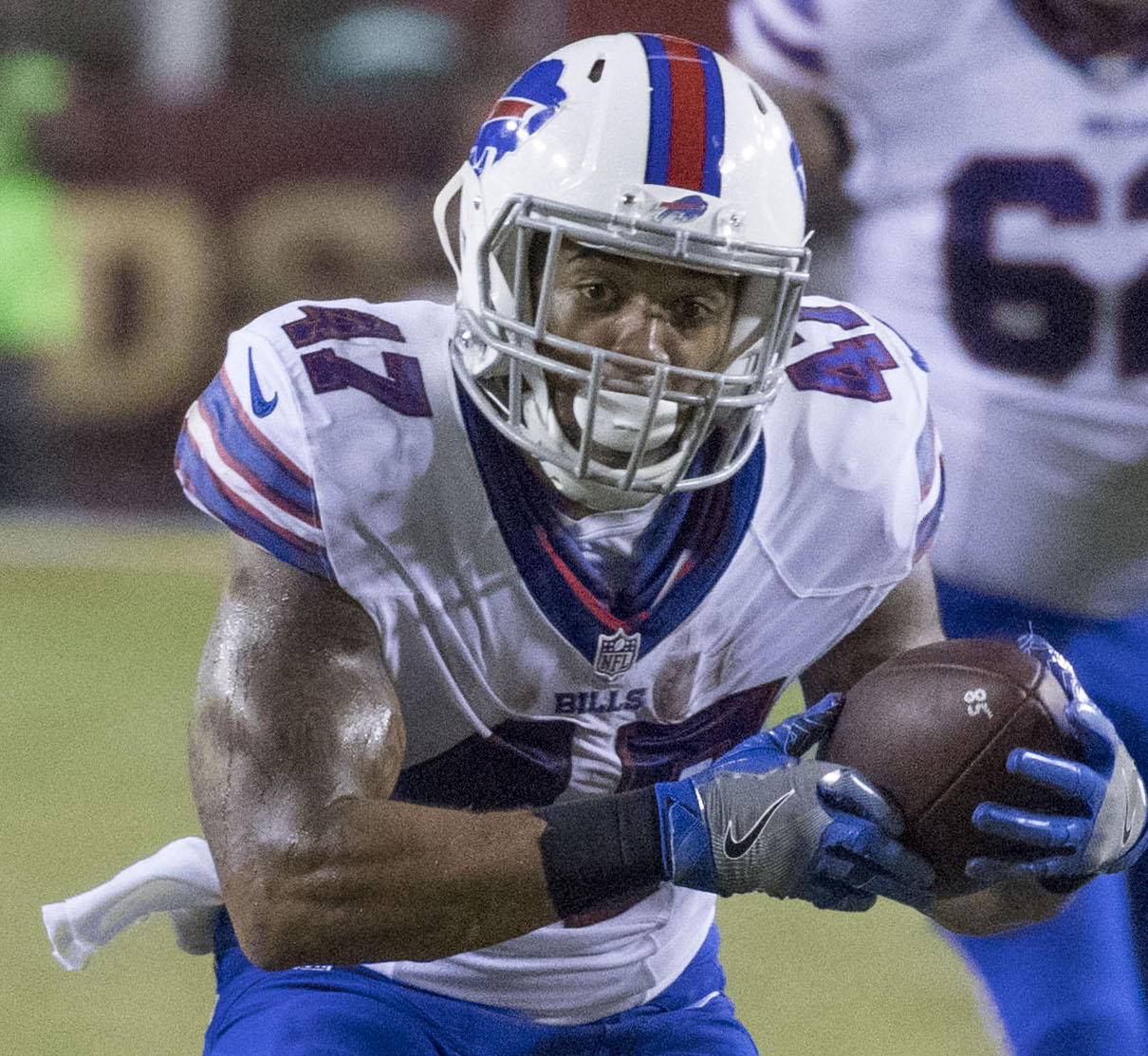
- Herron with the Bills in the 2016 preseason

No. 34, 36, 38
- Position: Running back

Personal information
- Born: March 21, 1989 (age 37); Warren, Ohio, U.S.
- Listed height: 5 ft 10 in (1.78 m)
- Listed weight: 215 lb (98 kg)

Career information
- High school: Warren G. Harding (Warren, Ohio)
- College: Ohio State
- NFL draft: 2012: 6th round, 191st overall pick

Career history
- Cincinnati Bengals (2012); Indianapolis Colts (2013–2014); Buffalo Bills (2015); Indianapolis Colts (2015); Buffalo Bills (2016)*
- * Offseason or practice squad member only

Awards and highlights
- First-team All-Big Ten (2010)

Career NFL statistics
- Rushing attempts: 112
- Rushing yards: 468
- Rushing touchdowns: 1
- Receptions: 31
- Receiving yards: 277
- Stats at Pro Football Reference

Daniel "Boom" Herron (born March 21, 1989) is an American former professional football player who was a running back in the National Football League (NFL). Herron played college football for the Ohio State Buckeyes. He was selected by the Cincinnati Bengals in the sixth round of the 2012 NFL draft, and also played for the Indianapolis Colts and Buffalo Bills.

== Early life ==
Herron was a running back at Warren G. Harding High School for the Raiders. He amassed his best season as a junior, rushing for over 1,500 yards and 17 touchdowns. When asked what he thought of his player, then Harding coach Thom Mcdaniels replied, "I wouldn’t trade “Boom” for any running back in Ohio." Coming out of high school, he ran a 40 yard dash in the mid 4.5's and boasted an impressive 37 inch vertical. Scout.com had him ranked as the 27th best backfield recruit in the country.

== College career ==
Herron spent five years at The Ohio State University. He was a four-time letterman. In 2008, he struggled to get playing time over future NFL back Beanie Wells and again in 2009 splitting time with Brandon Saine in an offense heavily centered around the running talents of quarterback Terrelle Pryor. In 2010, Herron delivered as the starter, totaling 1,155 yards and 16 touchdowns. Later that year, just a week before the team's appearance in their bowl game, it became apparent that Herron, amongst other top Buckeye players, was facing substantial NCAA sanctions.

On December 23, 2010, Herron and four other Ohio State players were suspended for the first five games of the 2011 season, but were still allowed to play in that year's Sugar Bowl, which they won 31-26 in a game against Arkansas. Herron was said to have sold a jersey, pants, and shoes that he had previously worn in a game. The other suspended players were quarterback Terrelle Pryor, wide receiver DeVier Posey, offensive lineman Mike Adams, and defensive end Soloman Thomas.

On October 3, 2011, in an unrelated story, Herron was suspended for one more week due to being overpaid during a summer job in the Cleveland area. Despite the six-week suspension, Herron was elected a team captain by his teammates and went on to rush for 675 yards and three touchdowns the remainder of the season.

=== College statistics ===
Year	Team	GP	Rushing			
Year	Team	GP	Att	Yds	Avg	TD
2008	Ohio State	11	89	439	4.9	6
2009	Ohio State	10	153	633	3.9	7
2010	Ohio State	13	216	1,155	5.3	16
2011	Ohio State	7	135	678	5.0	3
Total		41	593	2,946	4.8	32

== Professional career ==
Pre-draft measurables
Height	Weight	Arm length	Hand span	40-yard dash	10-yard split	20-yard split	20-yard shuttle	Three-cone drill	Vertical jump	Broad jump	Bench press
5 ft 10 in (1.78 m)	213 lb (97 kg)	32 in (0.81 m)	9 in (0.23 m)	4.57 s	1.56 s	2.60 s	4.04 s	6.97 s	35 in (0.89 m)	9 ft 9 in (2.97 m)	22 reps
All values from NFL Combine

=== Cincinnati Bengals ===
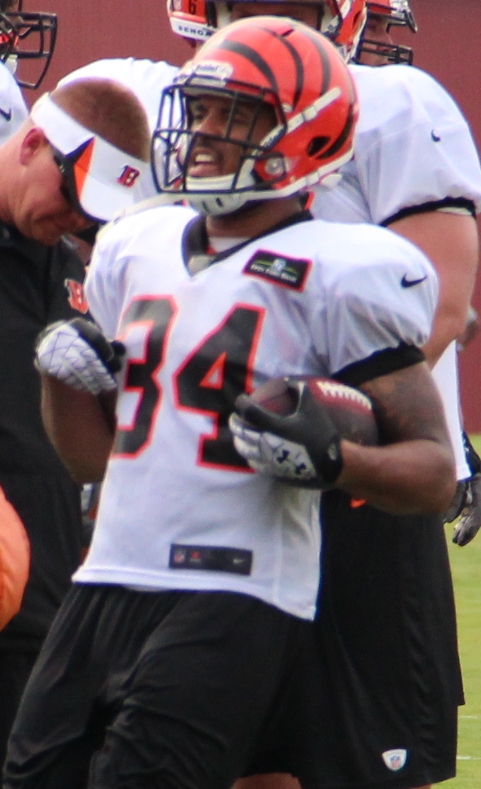
Herron at Bengals' training camp in 2013

Herron signed a four-year deal through 2015 with the Cincinnati Bengals on May 23, 2012. On August 31, 2012, he was cut by the Bengals. On December 4, 2012, Herron was recalled to the Bengals active roster after spending the first part of the season on the practice squad. On December 13, 2012, Herron blocked a punt against the Philadelphia Eagles; in the same game he had his first carry. He ended the game with three carries for eight yards.

=== Indianapolis Colts (first stint) ===
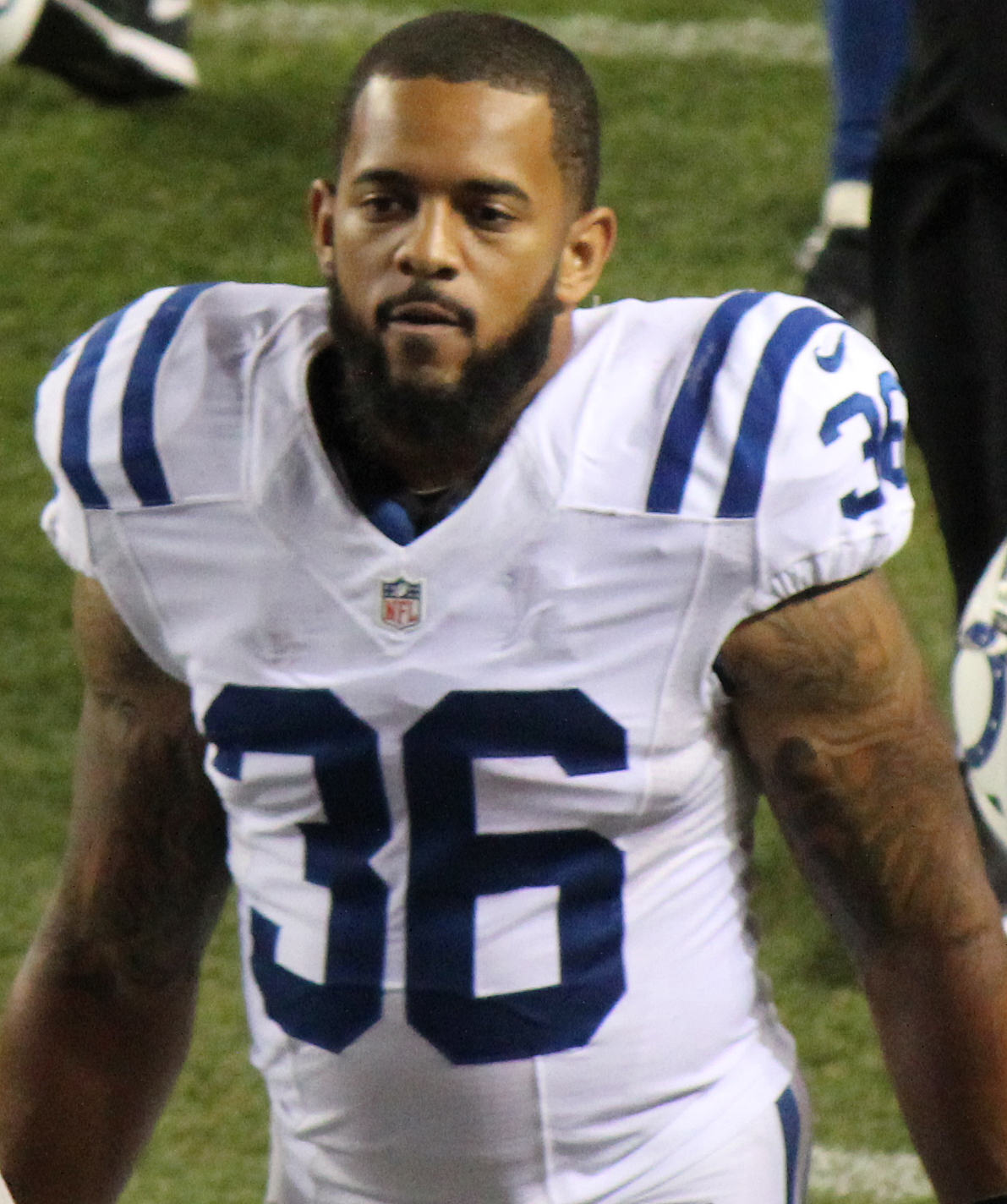
Herron with the Indianapolis Colts in 2014

The Indianapolis Colts signed Herron on October 9, 2013. On November 30, 2014, in a game against the Washington Redskins, Herron recorded his first career rushing touchdown, on a career-long 49-yard run to put Indianapolis up 14-3. The Colts ended the game with a 49-27 victory. In his first postseason game, Herron rushed 12 times for 56 yards and a touchdown, adding 10 receptions for 85 yards as the Colts defeated his former team, the Cincinnati Bengals, 26–10. The following week, Herron touched the ball a career-high 31 times (23 carries, eight receptions) and recorded a combined 95 yards and one rushing touchdown to help Indianapolis defeat the Denver Broncos 24–13. Herron was tendered a contract at the end of the season, as an exclusive-rights free agent. On April 1, he signed his tender. Herron was waived injured on September 6, 2015.

=== Buffalo Bills (first stint) ===
On October 6, 2015, Herron signed with the Buffalo Bills. On November 25, 2015, he was released.

=== Indianapolis Colts (second stint) ===
On November 26, 2015, Herron was claimed off waivers by the Colts. On March 9, 2016, Herron did not receive a tender from the Colts, thus making him a free agent.

=== Buffalo Bills (second stint) ===
On June 9, 2016, Herron was signed by the Bills. On September 2, he was released by the Bills as part of final roster cuts.

== NFL career statistics ==
=== Regular season ===
Year	Team	Games		Rushing					Receiving					Fumbles	
Year	Team	GP	GS	Att	Yds	Avg	Lng	TD	Rec	Yds	Avg	Lng	TD	Fum	Lost
2012	CIN	3	0	4	5	1.3	6	0	0	0	0.0	0	0	0	0
2013	IND	6	0	5	33	6.6	22	0	1	57	57.0	57	0	0	0
2014	IND	16	3	78	351	4.5	49T	1	21	173	8.2	26	0	2	2
2015	BUF	4	0	11	37	3.4	8	0	3	20	6.7	9	0	1	0
Total		29	3	98	426	4.3	49	1	25	250	10.0	57	0	3	2

=== Postseason ===
Year	Team	Games		Rushing					Receiving					Fumbles	
Year	Team	GP	GS	Att	Yds	Avg	Lng	TD	Rec	Yds	Avg	Lng	TD	Fum	Lost
2014	IND	3	3	45	170	3.8	27	2	20	128	6.4	18	0	2	1
Total		3	3	45	170	3.8	27	2	20	128	6.4	18	0	2	1

== Personal life ==
His brother, David Herron, is former NFL linebacker who played college football for the Michigan State Spartans.
