= DeVier Posey =

American football player (born 1990)

No. 5, 11, 80, 85
- Position: Wide receiver

Personal information
- Born: March 15, 1990 (age 36); San Mateo, California, U.S.
- Listed height: 6 ft 1 in (1.85 m)
- Listed weight: 214 lb (97 kg)

Career information
- High school: Cincinnati (OH) La Salle
- College: Ohio State (2008–2011)
- NFL draft: 2012: 3rd round, 68th overall pick

Career history
- Houston Texans (2012–2014); New York Jets (2015)*; Denver Broncos (2016)*; Toronto Argonauts (2016–2017); Baltimore Ravens (2018)*; BC Lions (2018); Montreal Alouettes (2019); Hamilton Tiger-Cats (2020–2021); BC Lions (2021)
- * Offseason or practice squad member only

Awards and highlights
- Grey Cup champion (2017); Grey Cup MVP (2017)

Career NFL statistics
- Receptions: 22
- Receiving yards: 272
- Receiving average: 12.4
- Stats at Pro Football Reference

Career CFL statistics
- Receptions: 144
- Receiving yards: 2,080
- Receiving average: 14.4
- Receiving touchdowns: 13
- Stats at CFL.ca

DeVier Stewart Posey (born March 15, 1990) is an American former professional football player who was a wide receiver in the National Football League (NFL) and Canadian Football League (CFL). He was selected by the Houston Texans in the third round of the 2012 NFL draft. He played college football at Ohio State. He was also a member of the New York Jets, Denver Broncos, Toronto Argonauts, Baltimore Ravens, Montreal Alouettes, Hamilton Tiger-Cats and BC Lions.

== College career ==
Posey played college football at Ohio State. He started his college career with a 25-yard touchdown catch from quarterback Todd Boeckman against Youngstown State. On October 31, 2009, against New Mexico State, on a reverse, Posey threw a 39-yard touchdown pass to Dane Sanzenbacher.

On December 23, 2010, DeVier Posey and four other Ohio State players were suspended for the first five games of the 2011 season, but were allowed to play in Ohio State's bowl game, the Allstate Sugar Bowl, which they won 31–26 vs. Arkansas. DeVier Posey was said to have sold a jersey, pants, and shoes that he had previously worn in a game. The other suspended players were quarterback Terrelle Pryor, running back Dan Herron, offensive lineman Mike Adams and defensive end Solomon Thomas.

=== Statistics ===
| Season | Games | | Receiving | | | | Punt return | | | |
| Season | GP | GS | Rec | Yds | Avg | TD | Ret | Yds | Avg | Lng |
|---|---|---|---|---|---|---|---|---|---|---|
| 2008 | 12 | 0 | 11 | 117 | 10.6 | 1 | 1 | 4 | 4.0 | 4 |
| 2009 | 12 | 12 | 60 | 828 | 13.8 | 8 | 3 | 5 | 1.7 | 5 |
| Career | 24 | 12 | 71 | 945 | 13.3 | 9 | 4 | 9 | 2.2 | 5 |

== Professional career ==
=== Houston Texans ===
In the 2012 NFL draft, Posey was selected by the Houston Texans in the third round (68th overall).

On January 13, 2013, he injured his ankle during the New England Patriots 41–28 win over the Texans in the AFC Divisional Rounds. Further testing indicated that he had suffered a ruptured Achilles tendon.

=== New York Jets ===
The Texans traded Posey and their 2015 third round (82nd overall), fifth round (152nd overall), and seventh round (229th overall) draft picks to the New York Jets in exchange for New York's 2015 third round (70th overall, used to pick Jaelen Strong) draft pick on May 1, 2015. He was waived on August 30, 2015.

=== Denver Broncos ===
On January 4, 2016, the Denver Broncos signed Posey. He was released by the Broncos on August 29, 2016.

=== Toronto Argonauts ===
On September 19, 2016, the Toronto Argonauts of the Canadian Football League (CFL) signed Posey. Posey appeared in four games for the Argonauts in his first year in the CFL; recording 13 receptions for 161 yards. Posey also returned punts and kickoffs. After a strong start to the 2017 season (second in the league in receiving yards through three games with 280 yards) Posey was placed on the team's six-game injured list with an undisclosed injury. On Nov. 26, Posey scored a touchdown in the 105th Grey Cup on a 100-yard pass play, the longest pass in the championship game's history, and was named the Grey Cup Most Valuable Player. Posey, who was set to become a free agent on February 13, 2018, was released by the Argos on February 2, 2018 so he could pursue NFL opportunities.

=== Baltimore Ravens ===
On February 6, 2018, Posey signed with the Baltimore Ravens of the NFL. He was released August 31, 2018.

=== BC Lions (first stint) ===
Following his release by the Ravens Posey returned to the CFL, signing with the BC Lions on September 10, 2018. In 8 games with the Lions, Posey caught 29 passes for 395 yards and 3 touchdowns. The three scores all came in the span of one quarter and resulted in a victory over Edmonton to clinch a playoff berth.

=== Montreal Alouettes ===
On the opening day of free agency, Posey signed with the Montreal Alouettes to a two-year contract. Posey played in three games for the Alouettes early in the season, catching nine passes for 100 yards with one touchdown. He was placed on the six-game injured reserve list with a calf injury on July 19, 2019. Posey was activated from the six-game injured reserve list on August 13, 2019. In total, he played in 12 games for the Alouettes in 2019, recording 50 receptions for 780 yards and three touchdowns. Prior to 2020 free agency, Posey was released.

=== Hamilton Tiger-Cats ===
After becoming a free agent again, Posey signed with the Hamilton Tiger-Cats on February 12, 2020. Following a cancelled 2020 season Posey and the Ti-Cats agreed to a new contract on February 5, 2021. He began the season on the team's six-game injured list and was then released after seven games on September 30, 2021 without having played in a game for the Tiger-Cats.

=== BC Lions (second stint) ===
On October 8, 2021, it was announced that Posey had signed with the Lions. He played in one game where he had one catch for four yards. He became a free agent upon the expiry of his contract on February 8, 2022.

== Personal life ==
His brother Julian Posey also played in the NFL.
