= Dane Sanzenbacher =

American football player (born 1988)

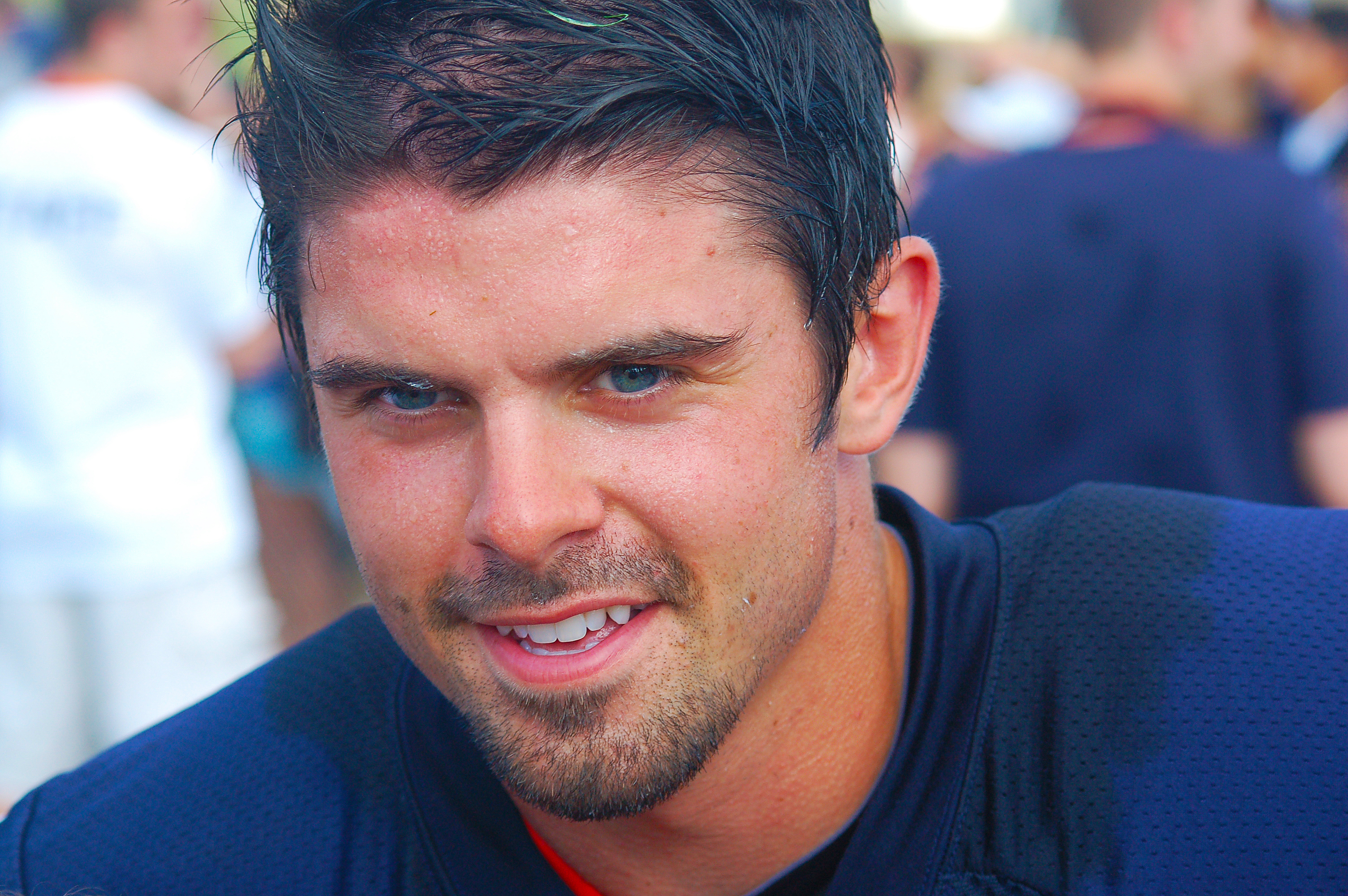
- Sanzenbacher after Bears training camp.

No. 11, 18
- Position: Wide receiver

Personal information
- Born: October 13, 1988 (age 38); Maumee, Ohio, U.S.
- Listed height: 5 ft 11 in (1.80 m)
- Listed weight: 180 lb (82 kg)

Career information
- High school: Central Catholic (Toledo, Ohio)
- College: Ohio State
- NFL draft: 2011: undrafted

Career history
- Chicago Bears (2011–2012); Cincinnati Bengals (2012–2014)

Awards and highlights
- First-team All-Big Ten (2010)

Career NFL statistics
- Receptions: 43
- Receiving yards: 449
- Receiving touchdowns: 3
- Interceptions: 1
- Stats at Pro Football Reference

Dane Sanzenbacher (born October 13, 1988) is an American former professional football player who was a wide receiver in the National Football League (NFL). He played college football for the Ohio State Buckeyes and was signed by the Chicago Bears as an undrafted free agent in 2011.

== Early life ==
Sanzenbacher played high school football at Central Catholic High School in Toledo, Ohio. He holds the school record for multiple categories including career receiving yards with 2,808, career receptions with 151, and career all purpose yards with 4,079. He is fourth in career scoring with 167 points. He helped guide Central Catholic to the 2005 state championship with three touchdown receptions. He was a two-time City League player of the year. His junior year, Dane earned first-team all-state.

As a junior, Sanzenbacher grabbed 71 receptions for 16 touchdowns and 1,424 yards. He also played defensive back and had 11 interceptions. His senior season, Dane had 61 receptions for 1,079 yards and 11 touchdowns. In seven career playoff games, he recorded 40 receptions for 842 yards and nine touchdowns in addition to 40 solo tackles and eight interceptions.

Sanzenbacher also ran track and was all-state in the 400-meter dash.

He committed to Ohio State in July 2006 and was ranked as the No. 12 overall prospect in Ohio.

== College career ==
Sanzenbacher had 12 catches for 89 yards as a true freshman in 2007. He caught a touchdown on his very first college reception, a three-yard reception from Todd Boeckman in the Youngstown State win. He received a letter for the year.

Sanzenbacher was among OSU's top three receivers in 2008. For the year, he had 21 receptions for 272 yards and 1 touchdown. His season long reception went for 53 yards.

Sanzenbacher was the Buckeyes' second leading receiver in 2009. He grabbed 36 receptions for 570 yards and 6 touchdowns. He had a career long 76-yard reception. When the Buckeyes played his hometown team, the Toledo Rockets, Dane had a career game with 5 receptions going for 126 yards and 2 touchdowns.

Sanzenbacher finished his senior season in 2010 as the Buckeyes leading receiver. He led all Buckeyes with 55 receptions, 948 receiving yards, and 11 receiving touchdowns. In week 4, Sanzenbacher had a break-out game with four receiving touchdowns against Eastern Michigan, tying the OSU record for most receiving touchdowns in a game. Sanzenbacher earned first-team All-Big Ten honors. At the team banquet, Sanzenbacher was voted as the team's most valuable player as well as the Bo Rein Award winner as the team's most inspirational player. Coach Jim Tressel revealed that, for the first time he could recall, one player won both of the team's top awards and won them by a landslide.

=== Statistics ===
	Receiving			
Year	Rec	Yds	Yd/Rec	Tds
2007	12	89	7.4	1
2008	21	272	13.0	1
2009	36	570	15.8	6
2010	55	948	17.2	11
Total	121	1820	15.0	19
Source: Big Ten Network

== Professional career ==
=== Chicago Bears ===
Sanzenbacher was signed by the Chicago Bears as an undrafted free agent following the 2011 NFL draft on July 26, 2011. Sanzenbacher finished his rookie season in the NFL with 27 receptions going for 276 yards and 3 receiving touchdowns, making him the first undrafted Bears rookie to score more than one touchdown since Dennis McKinnon in 1983.

Sanzenbacher's spot with the team was initially in doubt for the 2012 season after the Bears acquired Brandon Marshall, Alshon Jeffery, Eric Weems, and Rashied Davis. However, Sanzenbacher would eventually make the 53-man roster as the sixth receiver.

The Bears waived Sanzenbacher on December 24, 2012.

=== Cincinnati Bengals ===
The Cincinnati Bengals signed Sanzenbacher on December 25, 2012. On March 5, 2014, the Bengals offered him a tender. He signed his tender on April 8.

On December 28, 2014, Sanzenbacher recorded his first career interception, picking off a pass by Pittsburgh Steelers punter Brad Wing on a fake punt.

== Post-playing career ==
Sanzenbacher was a reporter for 2 years with the CBS affiliate in his hometown, Toledo, OH - WTOL-TV following his time in the NFL.

He then moved on to be the Director of Admission at his alma mater, Toledo Central Catholic High School. Sanzenbacher currently works at 97.1 The Fan and Boren Brothers Waste Management.

On August 14, 2021 Sanzenbacher married Allie Hausfeld.
