= Jermale Hines =

American football player (born 1987)

No. 26, 36
- Position: Safety

Personal information
- Born: November 11, 1987 (age 38); Cleveland, Ohio, U.S.
- Listed height: 6 ft 1 in (1.85 m)
- Listed weight: 218 lb (99 kg)

Career information
- High school: Glenville (Cleveland)
- College: Ohio State
- NFL draft: 2011: 5th round, 158th overall pick

Career history
- St. Louis Rams (2011); Indianapolis Colts (2011); Carolina Panthers (2011); Indianapolis Colts (2011); Sacramento Mountain Lions (2012)

Awards and highlights
- First-team All-Big Ten (2010)

Career NFL statistics
- Total tackles: 6
- Stats at Pro Football Reference

Jermale Hines (born November 11, 1987) is an American former professional football player who was a safety in the National Football League (NFL). He played college football for the Ohio State Buckeyes and was selected by the St. Louis Rams in the fifth round of the 2011 NFL draft. He was also a member of the Carolina Panthers.

== College career ==
Hines was a 2010 First-team All-Big Ten selection as a strong safety after playing free safety in 2009. He ended his career with 28 starts, 155 tackles. In 2009 Hines was a starter at free safety and was fourth on the squad with 57 tackles. In 2008, he played safety and made 31 tackles for the year. In 2007, he played on special teams as a true freshman.

== Professional career ==
Pre-draft measurables
Height	Weight	Arm length	Hand span	Wingspan	40-yard dash	10-yard split	20-yard split	20-yard shuttle	Three-cone drill	Vertical jump	Broad jump	Bench press
6 ft 1 1/8 in (1.86 m)	219 lb (99 kg)	32 1/4 in (0.82 m)	9 3/4 in (0.25 m)	6 ft 3 3/8 in (1.91 m)	4.59 s	1.56 s	2.63 s	4.21 s	6.90 s	31.0 in (0.79 m)	9 ft 6 in (2.90 m)	19 reps
All values from NFL Combine/Pro Day

=== St. Louis Rams ===
Hines was selected with the 158th pick in the 2011 NFL draft by the St. Louis Rams. He was waived on September 27.

=== Indianapolis Colts (first stint) ===
On September 28, the Indianapolis Colts claimed him off of waivers, but was waived on October 3.

=== Carolina Panthers ===
Hines was claimed off waivers by the Carolina Panthers on October 4. He was waived on November 15. On Oct 18th he was signed to the Carolina Practice Squad.

=== Indianapolis Colts (second stint) ===
Hines was signed by the Colts on November 30, 2011. On September 1, 2012, he was cut by the Colts.
