= Orhian Johnson =

American gridiron football player (born 1989)

No. 28
- Position: Safety

Personal information
- Born: October 9, 1989 (age 37); St. Petersburg, Florida, U.S.
- Listed height: 6 ft 3 in (1.91 m)
- Listed weight: 211 lb (96 kg)

Career information
- College: Ohio State
- NFL draft: 2013: undrafted

Career history
- Houston Texans (2013)*; Toronto Argonauts (2013); Arizona Cardinals (2013–2014)*; Toronto Argonauts (2014)
- * Offseason or practice squad member only

Career CFL statistics
- Tackles: 1
- Stats at CFL.ca (archived)
- Stats at Pro Football Reference

Orhian Johnson (born October 9, 1989) is an American former football safety. He played college football at Ohio State.

== Early life ==
Johnson played high school football for the Boca Ciega High School Pirates, located in Gulfport, Florida and was the starting varsity quarterback for three years. He also lettered in basketball while at Boca Ciega High School. He graduated high school in 2008.

== Professional career ==
=== Houston Texans ===
On April 27, 2013, he signed with the Houston Texans as an undrafted free agent following the 2013 NFL draft. On August 31, 2013, Johnson was released by the Texans as a final training camp cut.

=== Toronto Argonauts ===
On October 12, 2013, Johnson was signed to a practice roster agreement by the Toronto Argonauts of the Canadian Football League. He was released by the Argonauts on November 7, 2013.

=== Arizona Cardinals ===
On December 11, 2013, Johnson signed with the Arizona Cardinals practice squad. The Cardinals released Johnson on August 25, 2014.

=== Toronto Argonauts ===
On September 6, 2014, Johnson signed with the Toronto Argonauts of the Canadian Football League.
