= Ross Homan =

American football player (born 1987)

No. 57
- Position: Linebacker

Personal information
- Born: March 5, 1987 (age 39); Coldwater, Ohio, U.S.
- Listed height: 6 ft 1 in (1.85 m)
- Listed weight: 240 lb (109 kg)

Career information
- High school: Coldwater (OH)
- College: Ohio State
- NFL draft: 2011: 6th round, 200th overall pick

Career history
- Minnesota Vikings (2011)*; Tampa Bay Buccaneers (2011)*
- * Offseason or practice squad member only

Awards and highlights
- First-team All-Big Ten (2010); Second-team All-Big Ten (2009)
- Stats at Pro Football Reference

Ross Homan (born March 5, 1987) is an American former professional football linebacker. After playing college football for Ohio State, he was selected by the Minnesota Vikings in the sixth round of the 2011 NFL draft. He was also a member of the Tampa Bay Buccaneers.

== Early life ==
Homan played high school football at his hometown Coldwater High School, where he recorded more than 300 solo tackles and 182 assists, including 25 tackles for lost yardage. He also was Ohio's 2005 Division IV Player of the Year and led Coldwater to the 2005 Ohio Division IV State Championship. In his career at Coldwater, he also played running back where he recorded 2,418 yards and 40 touchdowns on 382 carries and caught 43 passes for 737 yards and nine touchdowns.

== College career ==
During his college career, he had a major impact on the defense of the Ohio State Buckeyes. He recorded 253 tackles, two forced fumble, and seven interceptions. Asked by recruiters why he had "only" 120 tackles his senior year he admitted he had played with a broken collarbone.

== Professional career ==
Pre-draft measurables
Height	Weight	Arm length	Hand span	Wingspan	40-yard dash	10-yard split	20-yard split	20-yard shuttle	Three-cone drill	Vertical jump	Broad jump	Bench press
6 ft 0 3/4 in (1.85 m)	240 lb (109 kg)	30 1/2 in (0.77 m)	9 3/4 in (0.25 m)	6 ft 2 1/4 in (1.89 m)	4.66 s	1.56 s	2.76 s	4.34 s	7.21 s	35.5 in (0.90 m)	9 ft 3 in (2.82 m)	32 reps
All values from NFL Combine/Pro Day

Homan was selected with the 200th overall pick in the sixth round of the 2011 NFL draft by the Minnesota Vikings. He was released by the Vikings on September 3 during final roster cuts.

On September 14, 2011, he was signed to the practice squad of the Tampa Bay Buccaneers. He was released on September 18. He subsequently retired due to concussions suffered during his career.

== Personal life ==
He is the son of David and Alice Homan of Coldwater, Ohio. He is the middle of two brothers. Adam played fullback for the Ohio State Buckeyes. He also is the cousin of former Buckeyes Bobby and Tommy Hoying. Ross graduated from Ohio State in the spring of 2011 with a marketing degree and currently resides in Lexington, Kentucky working in medical sales.
