= Brandon Saine =

American football player (born 1988)

No. 33
- Position: Running back

Personal information
- Born: December 14, 1988 (age 37); Piqua, Ohio, U.S.
- Listed height: 5 ft 11 in (1.80 m)
- Listed weight: 220 lb (100 kg)

Career information
- High school: Piqua
- College: Ohio State
- NFL draft: 2011: undrafted

Career history
- Green Bay Packers (2011–2012)

Awards and highlights
- Second-team All-Big Ten (2009)

Career NFL statistics
- Rushing attempts: 18
- Rushing yards: 69
- Receptions: 10
- Receiving yards: 69
- Stats at Pro Football Reference

Brandon Croft Saine (born December 14, 1988) is an American former professional football player who was a running back for the Green Bay Packers of the National Football League (NFL). He played college football for the Ohio State Buckeyes. Saine was signed by the Packers as an undrafted free agent in 2011.

== Early life ==
As a junior, Brandon Saine ran for over 1,300 yards and scored 21 touchdowns while receiving All-State, All-Conference, and Conference Player of the Year honors. In his senior year, he ran for 1,895 yards and 27 touchdowns on 259 carries, while recording 30 receptions for 412 yards, And won state. Saine was the 2006 Mr. Football Award recipient and was ranked second overall in the 2007 football recruiting class from Ohio by Rivals.com, and ranked 50th among the Rivals 100, a list compiled from nationwide recruits. He was said to have run a 4.2 forty time during his senior year

Saine also lettered in track at Piqua and currently holds the Ohio Division I record in the 100-meter dash, with a time of 10.38, which he set in 2006. He had four state track titles and a national championship in the 60-meter dash.

== College career ==
Saine was compared to Reggie Bush while entering his Freshman year at Ohio State, due to his ability to be a jack of all trades, running, blocking and even spending time in the slot as a WR. Saine has been officially timed at 4.4 seconds in the forty yard dash, although he has been unofficially timed at 4.25 seconds.

=== College statistics ===
Season	Rushing				Receiving			
Season	Att	Yds	Avg	TD	Rec	Yds	Avg	TD
2007	60	267	4.5	2	12	160	13.3	1
2008	26	65	2.5	1	3	37	12.3	0
2009	145	739	5.1	4	17	224	13.2	2
2010	70	337	4.8	2	23	195	8.5	5
Total	301	1,408	4.7	9	55	616	11.2	8

== Professional career ==
Saine was signed as an undrafted free agent by the Green Bay Packers on July 28, 2011. Saine was released by the Packers on April 24, 2013 after failing a physical.
