= 2009 Ohio State Buckeyes football team =

American college football season

2009 Ohio State Buckeyes football

Big Ten champion Rose Bowl champion

Rose Bowl, W 26–17 vs. Oregon
- Conference: Big Ten Conference

Ranking
- Coaches: No. 5
- AP: No. 5
- Record: 11–2 (7–1 Big Ten)
- Head coach: Jim Tressel (9th season)
- Offensive coordinator: Jim Bollman (9th season)
- Offensive scheme: Multiple
- Defensive coordinator: Jim Heacock (5th season)
- Co-defensive coordinator: Luke Fickell (5th season)
- Base defense: 4–3
- Captain: 4: Kurt Coleman; Austin Spitler; Doug Worthington; Offensive captains by game
- Home stadium: Ohio Stadium

Uniform

2009 Big Ten Conference football standings
	Conf.			Overall
Team	W		L	W		L
No. 5 Ohio State $	7	–	1	11	–	2
No. 7 Iowa %	6	–	2	11	–	2
No. 9 Penn State	6	–	2	11	–	2
Northwestern	5	–	3	8	–	5
No. 16 Wisconsin	5	–	3	10	–	3
Michigan State	4	–	4	6	–	7
Purdue	4	–	4	5	–	7
Minnesota	3	–	5	6	–	7
Illinois	2	–	6	3	–	9
Michigan	1	–	7	5	–	7
Indiana	1	–	7	4	–	8
$ – BCS representative as conference champion; % – BCS at-large representative; Rankings from AP Poll

The 2009 Ohio State Buckeyes football team represented Ohio State University in the 2009 NCAA Division I FBS football season. The Buckeyes were coached by Jim Tressel and played their home games in Ohio Stadium in Columbus, Ohio. They finished with a record of 11–2 (7–1 Big Ten) and won the Big Ten Conference championship. They represented the Big Ten in the 2010 Rose Bowl, which they won, 26–17, over the Pacific-10 Conference champion, Oregon. The Buckeyes became the first team to defeat five 10-win teams in the same season (Navy, Wisconsin, Penn State, Iowa, and Oregon).

== Before the season ==
=== Out ===
==== 2009 NFL Draft class ====
2009 Ohio State Buckeyes NFL Draft Class
Drafted		Player name	Position	Height	Weight	Drafted/Signed By
Round	Choice	Player name	Position	Height	Weight	Drafted/Signed By
1	14	Jenkins, Malcolm	CB	6-1	201	New Orleans Saints
1	31	Wells, Chris "Beanie"	RB (JR)	6-1	237	Arizona Cardinals
2	35	Laurinaitis, James	LB	6-3	240	St. Louis Rams
2	36	Robiskie, Brian	WR	6-3	199	Cleveland Browns
4	102	Washington, Donald	CB (JR)	6-0	194	Kansas City Chiefs
4	108	Hartline, Brian	WR (JR)	6-3	188	Miami Dolphins
5	154	Freeman, Marcus	LB	6-1	239	Chicago Bears
UFA	-	Abdallah, Nader	DT	6-4	300	Baltimore Ravens
UFA	-	Boeckman, Todd	QB	6-4	244	Jacksonville Jaguars
UFA	-	Boone, Alex	OT	6-8	312	San Francisco 49ers
UFA	-	Trapasso, A.J.	P	6-0	229	Tennessee Titans

==== Unsigned seniors ====
2009 Ohio State Buckeyes Unsigned Graduating Class
Player name	Position	Height	Weight
Ebner, Doug	OL	6-3	271
Gray, Bryan	DT/DE	6-2	285
Lane, Shaun	DB	5-10	175
Larson, J.D.	TE	6-4	229
Lukens, Ryan	RB	6-0	238
Mitchum, Kyle	OL	6-3	291
Nicol, Rory	TE	6-5	252
O'Neal, Jamario	S	6-0	205
Patterson, Nick	DB	6-1	209
Person, Ben	OL	6-3	323
Pretorius, Ryan	K	5-9	169
Rehring, Steve	OT	6-7	335
Ruhl, Kyle	WR	6-1	164
Skinner, Jon	OL	6-5	306
Smith, Brandon	TE	6-2	251
Terry, Curtis	LB	6-1	229
Wells, Maurice	RB	5-10	196

==== NFL Draft early entries ====
- On Jan 8, RB Chris "Beanie" Wells decided to skip his senior season and enter the 2009 NFL draft.
- On Jan 14, WR Brian Hartline decided to skip his senior season and enter the 2009 NFL draft.
- On Jan 15, CB Donald Washington decided to skip his senior season and enter the 2009 NFL draft.

==== Transfers ====
- Defensive tackle Willie Mobley plans to transfer to UCLA. He was not able to enroll for the fall quarter for lack of the necessary credits.

=== In ===
==== Transfers ====
- No Transfers at this time.

== Schedule ==
Date	Time	Opponent	Rank	Site	TV	Result	Attendance
September 5, 2009	12:00 p.m.	Navy*	No. 6	Ohio Stadium; Columbus, OH	ESPN	W 31–27	105,092
September 12	8:00 p.m.	No. 3 USC*	No. 8	Ohio Stadium; Columbus, OH (College GameDay)	ESPN	L 15–18	106,033
September 19	12:00 p.m.	vs. Toledo*	No. 11	Cleveland Browns Stadium; Cleveland, OH (Patriot Bowl)	ESPN+	W 38–0	71,727
September 26	3:30 p.m.	Illinois	No. 13	Ohio Stadium; Columbus, OH (Illibuck Trophy)	ABC/ESPN	W 30–0	105,219
October 3	7:00 p.m.	at Indiana	No. 9	Memorial Stadium; Bloomington, IN	BTN	W 33–14	51,500
October 10	3:30 p.m.	Wisconsin	No. 9	Ohio Stadium; Columbus, OH	ABC/ESPN	W 31–13	105,301
October 17	12:00 p.m.	at Purdue	No. 7	Ross–Ade Stadium; West Lafayette, IN	BTN	L 18–26	50,404
October 24	12:00 p.m.	Minnesota^{†}	No. 18	Ohio Stadium; Columbus, OH	ESPN	W 38–7	105,011
October 31	12:00 p.m.	New Mexico State*	No. 17	Ohio Stadium; Columbus, OH	BTN	W 45–0	104,719
November 7	3:30 p.m.	at No. 11 Penn State	No. 15	Beaver Stadium; University Park, PA (rivalry)	ABC/ESPN2	W 24–7	110,033
November 14	3:30 p.m.	No. 11 Iowa	No. 10	Ohio Stadium; Columbus, OH	ABC/ESPN	W 27–24 ^{OT}	105,455
November 21	12:00 p.m.	at Michigan	No. 9	Michigan Stadium; Ann Arbor, MI (The Game)	ABC	W 21–10	110,922
January 1, 2010	5:10 p.m.	vs. No. 7 Oregon*	No. 8	Rose Bowl; Pasadena, CA (Rose Bowl) (College GameDay)	ABC	W 26–17	93,963
*Non-conference game; ^{†}Homecoming; Rankings from AP Poll released prior to the game; All times are in Eastern time

== Coaching staff ==
- Jim Tressel – Head coach (9th year)
- Jim Bollman – Offensive line/OC (9th year)
- Nick Siciliano – Quarterbacks (1st year)
- Luke Fickell – Co-defensive coordinator / linebackers coach (8th year)
- Jim Heacock – Defensive coordinator / defensive line (14th year)
- Paul Haynes – Defensive safeties (5th year)
- Darrell Hazell – Assistant head coach / wide receivers (6th year)
- Traver Johnson – Defensive cornerbacks (3rd year)
- John Peterson – Tight ends coach / recruiting coordinator (6th year)
- Dick Tressel – Running backs (9th year)
- Greg Gillum – Director of football operations (1st year)
- Stan Jefferson – Director of player development (6th year)
- Eric Lichter – Director of football performance (4th year)
- Doug Davis – Strength coordinator (3rd year)
- Troy Sutton – Strength coordinator (2nd year)

== Regular season ==
=== Navy ===
Navy at #6 Ohio State

Team	1	2	3	4	Total
Navy	7	0	7	13	27
• #6 Ohio State	10	10	0	11	31

- Date: September 5
- Location: Ohio Stadium
  Columbus, OH
- Game start: 12:00 p.m. EDT
- Elapsed time: 2:58
- Game attendance: 105,092
- Game weather: Mostly Sunny, 75 F, Wind E at 3
- Referee: Tom DeJoseph
- TV announcers (ESPN): Dave Pasch (Play-by-play), Bob Griese (Color) & Chris Spielman (Color)

A crowd of 105,092 was the largest attendance recorded to watch the Buckeyes open a season against Navy. The Buckeyes scored first, but Navy tied it up, but the Bucks made it 20–7 at halftime. However, Ohio State nearly blew a 29–14 lead when Navy scored twice to come within 29–27. Navy's two-point conversion pass to potentially tie the game was intercepted and Ohio State returned it for a two-point defensive conversion to hold on to win for a final score of 31–27.

1st Quarter

- 12:37 OSU Sanzenbacher 38-yard pass from Pryor (Pettrey kick) 7–0 OSU
- 5:43 NAVY Dobbs 16-yard run (Buckley kick) 7–7
- 1:30 OSU Pettrey 23-yard field goal 10–7 OSU

2nd Quarter

- 9:01 OSU Pryor 2-yard run (Pettrey kick) 17–7 OSU
- 0:55 OSU Pettrey 25-yard field goal 20–7 OSU

3rd Quarter

- 1:24 NAVY Curry 16-yard pass from Dobbs (Buckley kick) 20–14 OSU

4th Quarter

- 14:11 OSU Pettrey 52-yard field goal 23–14 OSU
- 11:56 OSU Herron 6-yard run 29–14 OSU
- 6:15 NAVY Curry 85-yard pass from Dobbs (Buckley kick) 29–21 OSU
- 2:23 NAVY Dobbs 24-yard run 29–27 OSU
- 2:23 OSU Rolle defensive two-point conversion 31–27 OSU

=== USC ===
#3 USC at #8 Ohio State

Team	1	2	3	4	Total
• #3 USC	7	3	0	8	18
#8 Ohio State	7	3	5	0	15

- Date: September 12
- Location: Ohio Stadium
  Columbus, OH
- Game start: 8:00 p.m. EDT
- Elapsed time: 3:14
- Game attendance: 106,033
- Game weather: Clear, 71 F, Wind N at 9
- Referee: John O'Neil
- TV announcers (ESPN): Brent Musburger (Play-by-play), Kirk Herbstreit (Color) & Lisa Salters (Sideline)

A crowd of 106,033, the largest in Ohio Stadium history, were in attendance as the #3 USC Trojans came to Columbus, Ohio, to face the #8 Ohio State Buckeyes. Both teams showed great defense with the game close at the half tied 10–10. After a safety and a field goal, Ohio State led 15–10 with less than five minutes to go. However, Joe McKnight and the Trojans drove down the field to score a touchdown and a two-point conversion to end the game. The final score was USC 18, Ohio State 15, with the Buckeyes losing to the Trojans for the second straight year. This was also the first time Ohio State had lost to a team that had not later gone on to a BCS Bowl game since 2004, against Purdue.

1st Quarter

- 11:37 USC Johnson 2-yard run (Congdon kick) 7–0 USC
- 8:06 OSU Herron 2-yard run (Pettrey kick) 7–7

2nd Quarter

- 14:56 OSU Pettrey 18-yard field goal 10–7 OSU
- 0:00 USC Congdon 21-yard field goal 10–10

3rd Quarter

- 9:03 OSU Fumble out of the end zone 12–10 OSU
- 4:43 OSU Pettrey 22-yard field goal 15–10 OSU

4th Quarter

- 1:05 USC Johnson 2-yard run (Barkley pass to McKnight) 18–15 USC

=== Toledo ===
#11 Ohio State at Toledo

Team	1	2	3	4	Total
• #11 Ohio State	14	10	7	7	38
Toledo	0	0	0	0	0

- Date: September 19
- Location: Cleveland Browns Stadium
  Cleveland, OH
- Game start: 12:00 p.m. EDT
- Elapsed time: 3:05
- Game attendance: 71,727
- Game weather: Mostly Sunny, 63 F, Wind ESE at 3
- Referee: Ron Torbert
- TV announcers (ESPN+): Michael Reghi (Play-by-play) & Doug Chapman (Color)

The Ohio State Buckeyes and the Toledo Rockets met in Cleveland, Ohio, for their matchup. Toledo had scored an average of 42 points in their last two games against Purdue and Colorado. The Ohio State offense scored first with a 76-yard pass from Pryor, his longest at Ohio State, while the defense held the high scoring offense to no points in the first half. The final score was Ohio State 38, Toledo 0. This was Ohio State's first shutout since the 2008 game against Youngstown State.

1st Quarter

- 13:13 OSU Sanzenbacher 76-yard pass from Pryor (Pettrey kick) 7–0 OSU
- 5:51 OSU Sanzenbacher 18-yard pass from Pryor (Pettrey kick) 14–0 OSU

2nd Quarter

- 12:31 OSU Herron 4-yard run (Pettrey kick) 21–0 OSU
- 0:00 OSU Pettrey 47-yard field goal 24–0 OSU

3rd Quarter

- 7:59 OSU Pryor 1-yard run (Pettrey kick) 31–0 OSU

4th Quarter

- 7:10 OSU Posey 4-yard pass from Pryor (Pettrey kick) 38–0 OSU

=== Illinois ===
Illinois at #13 Ohio State

Team	1	2	3	4	Total
Illinois	0	0	0	0	0
• #13 Ohio State	3	10	10	7	30

- Date: September 26
- Location: Ohio Stadium
  Columbus, OH
- Game start: 3:30 p.m. EDT
- Elapsed time: 2:56
- Game attendance: 105,219
- Game weather: Overcast, Scattered Rain, 67 F, SE 5 MPH
- Referee: Dave Witvoet
- TV announcers (ABC/ESPN): Ron Franklin (Play-by-play) & Ed Cunningham (Color)

The #13 Ohio State Buckeyes hosted the Illinois Fighting Illini on a rainy afternoon in Columbus, Ohio. The last time these two met at Ohio Stadium, the Illini beat the #1 Buckeyes 28–21. Ohio State relied heavily on its running game to put up 13 points in the first half; in fact, quarterback Terrelle Pryor threw for 0 passing yards in the first half. Illinois committed several turnovers and never gained any momentum; the final score was Ohio State 30, Illinois 0. This was the second straight shutout for the Buckeyes, their first consecutive shutouts since 1996.

1st Quarter

- 8:09 OSU Pettrey 50-yard field goal 3–0 OSU

2nd Quarter

- 12:46 OSU Pettrey 46-yard field goal 6–0 OSU
- 7:30 OSU Herron 4-yard run (Pettrey kick) 13–0 OSU

3rd Quarter

- 10:55 OSU Herron 2-yard run (Pettrey kick) 20–0 OSU
- 2:28 OSU Pettrey 27-yard field goal 23–0 OSU

4th Quarter

- 1:18 OSU Sanzenbacher 2-yard pass from Pryor (Pettrey kick) 30–0 OSU

=== Indiana ===
#9 Ohio State at Indiana

Team	1	2	3	4	Total
• #9 Ohio State	10	14	2	7	33
Indiana	0	7	0	7	14

- Date: October 3
- Location: Memorial Stadium
  Bloomington, IN
- Game start: 7:00 p.m. EDT
- Elapsed time: 3:06
- Game attendance: 51,500
- Game weather: Overcast, 54 F, WSW 9 MPH
- Referee: Dan Capron
- TV announcers (BTN): Craig Coshun (Play-by-play), Glen Mason (Color) & Rebecca Haarlow (Sideline)

The #9 Ohio State Buckeyes traveled to Memorial Stadium in Bloomington, Indiana, for a night game against a Big Ten opponent, the Indiana Hoosiers. Ohio State came in posting two straight shutouts against Toledo and Illinois. The offense scored first with a field goal and a touchdown in the first quarter. However, the Hoosiers broke Ohio State's two game shutout streak with a touchdown in the second quarter. After the first half the Buckeyes led the Hoosiers 24–7. After a safety in the third quarter and a touchdown in the fourth; the Buckeyes were leading 33–7. The Hoosiers scored a touchdown at the end of the game to make the final score with Ohio State winning 33–14.

1st Quarter

- 12:10 OSU Pettrey 46-yard field goal 3–0 OSU
- 7:29 OSU Carter 5-yard pass from Pryor (Pettrey kick) 10–0 OSU

2nd Quarter

- 12:50 IND Doss 7-yard pass from Chappell (Freeland kick) 10–7 OSU
- 11:46 OSU Posey 23-yard pass from Pryor (Pettrey kick) 17–7 OSU
- 1:10 OSU Boren 8-yard pass from Pryor (Pettrey kick) 24–7 OSU

3rd Quarter

- 8:22 OSU tackle in the end zone 26–7 OSU

4th Quarter

- 12:05 OSU Pryor 1-yard run (Pettrey kick) 33–7 OSU
- 0:00 IND Ernest 5-yard pass from Chappell (Freeland kick) 33–14 OSU

=== Wisconsin ===
Wisconsin at #9 Ohio State

Team	1	2	3	4	Total
Wisconsin	0	10	3	0	13
• #9 Ohio State	7	7	14	3	31

- Date: October 10
- Location: Ohio Stadium
  Columbus, OH
- Game start: 3:30 p.m. EDT
- Elapsed time: 3:10
- Game attendance: 105,301
- Game weather: Partly Cloudy, 57 F, W 5 MPH
- Referee: Dennis Lipski
- TV announcers (ABC/ESPN): Sean McDonough (Play-by-play), Matt Millen (Color) & Holly Rowe (Sideline)

The Wisconsin Badgers came to Columbus being one of only three teams, including Ohio State, that were undefeated in Big Ten play. Ohio State scored first with an interception return back by Kurt Coleman. The Badgers, however, responded by scoring 10 unanswered points. With one minute left in the half, Terrelle Pryor led the Buckeyes to their first offensive touchdown of the day, taking the lead by a score of 14–10. The second half started with another interception returned for a touchdown and a kick return. In total, the Buckeyes had three non-offensive touchdowns on the day. The Buckeyes won the game 31–13 to stay undefeated in the Big Ten and a 5–1 record overall.

1st Quarter

- 3:48 OSU Coleman 89-yard interception return (Pettrey kick) 7–0 OSU

2nd Quarter

- 10:20 WIS Maragos 9-yard rush (Welch kick) 7–7
- 1:53 WIS Welch 50-yard field goal 10–7 WIS
- 0:40 OSU Posey 32-yard pass from Pryor (Pettrey kick) 14–10 OSU

3rd Quarter

- 12:08 OSU Hines 32-yard interception return (Pettrey kick) 21–10 OSU
- 10:06 WIS Welch 46-yard field goal 21–13 OSU
- 9:58 OSU Small 96-yard kickoff return (Pettrey kick) 28–13 OSU

4th Quarter

- 12:32 OSU Pettrey 37-yard field goal 31–13 OSU

=== Purdue ===
#7 Ohio State at Purdue

Team	1	2	3	4	Total
#7 Ohio State	7	0	0	11	18
• Purdue	3	6	14	3	26

- Date: October 17
- Location: Ross–Ade Stadium
  West Lafayette, IN
- Game start: 12:00 p.m. EDT
- Elapsed time: 3:18
- Game attendance: 50,404
- Game weather: Partly Cloudy, 46 F, Calm Winds
- Referee: Bill LeMonnier
- TV announcers (BTN): Wayne Larrivee (Play-by-play), Chris Martin (Color) & Rebecca Haarlow (Sideline)

The Ohio State Buckeyes traveled to West Lafayette, Indiana, on a cold October day playing against the Purdue Boilermakers. Purdue, who had lost many close games, came to play in front of their home fans at Ross-Ade Stadium. Purdue scored first with a field goal in the first quarter, but Ohio State made it 7–3 with a Pryor run for a touchdown. The second quarter was all Purdue with Boilermakers making two field goals to put them up it a 9–7 halftime. In the second half Purdue was finally able to find the end zone with two Joey Elliot touchdown passes to Valentin, making it a commanding 23–7 lead for the Boilermakers. In the fourth quarter both teams traded field goals with the score now 26–10. Purdue, however, was forced to punt midway through the fourth quarter and Ohio State quickly drove down the field to score a touchdown with a pass from Pryor to Posey, with Pryor running it in the two-point conversion. The next drive, Purdue went three and out and it seemed the momentum had shifted and Ohio State had come alive, but with a sack of Pryor and a denial of a fourth down, Purdue had the ball. After seemingly stopping Purdue, a crucial facemask penalty by the Buckeyes allowed the Boilermakers to run out the clock. This was the first time Ohio State had lost to a team that had finished the season with a losing record since losses to Wisconsin and Penn State in 2001.

1st Quarter

- 12:47 PUR Wiggs 32-yard field goal 3–0 PUR
- 11:28 OSU Pryor 6-yard run (Pettrey kick) 7–3 OSU

2nd Quarter

- 8:55 PUR Wiggs 27-yard field goal 7–6 OSU
- 0:01 PUR Wiggs 55-yard field goal 9–7 PUR

3rd Quarter

- 10:58 PUR Valentin 15-yard pass from Elliott (Wiggs kick) 16–7 PUR
- 3:35 PUR Valentin 23-yard pass from Elliott (Wiggs kick) 23–7 PUR

4th Quarter

- 11:50 OSU Pettrey 24-yard field goal 23–10 PUR
- 10:00 PUR Wiggs 49-yard field goal 26–10 PUR
- 7:14 OSU Posey 25-yard pass from Pryor (Pryor run) 26–18 PUR

=== Minnesota ===
Minnesota at #18 Ohio State

Team	1	2	3	4	Total
Minnesota	0	0	0	7	7
• #18 Ohio State	0	7	21	10	38

- Date: October 24
- Location: Ohio Stadium
  Columbus, OH
- Game start: 12:00 p.m. EDT
- Elapsed time: 3:10
- Game attendance: 105,011
- Game weather: Overcast, 52 F, SW 18 MPH
- Referee: Mike Cannon
- TV announcers (ESPN): Dave Pasch (Play-by-play), Bob Griese (Color) & Chris Spielman (Color)

The Ohio State Buckeyes returned to Ohio Stadium to face the Minnesota Golden Gophers. Ohio State came into the game with a loss to Purdue, trying not to lose two straight games since 2004. The game opened up with little offensive production for both teams. Ohio State scored first with a 62-yard pass to Posey. After half time Minnesota lost the opening kickoff which was recovered by Ohio State. Pryor later ran it in for a touchdown, Ohio State led 14–0. After many stops by the Ohio State defense, the offense continued rolling, at the end of the third quarter the score was 28–0 Ohio State. Two more scores in the fourth by Ohio State and a touchdown by Minnesota on Ohio State's backups ended the game. Ohio State came up with a big win over a struggling Minnesota team.

2nd Quarter

- 9:47 OSU Posey 62-yard pass from Pryor (Pettrey kick) 7–0 OSU

3rd Quarter

- 13:43 OSU Pryor 15-yard run (Pettrey kick) 14–0 OSU
- 6:00 OSU Hall 11-yard run (Pettrey kick) 21–0 OSU
- 2:59 OSU Posey 57-yard pass from Pryor (Pettrey kick) 28–0 OSU

4th Quarter

- 11:28 OSU Martin 39-yard run (Pettrey kick) 35–0 OSU
- 7:37 OSU Pettrey 44-yard field goal 38–0 OSU
- 4:15 MIN Stoudermire Jr. 16-yard pass from Gray (Ellestad kick) 38–7 OSU

=== New Mexico State ===
New Mexico State at #17 Ohio State

Team	1	2	3	4	Total
New Mexico State	0	0	0	0	0
• #17 Ohio State	0	28	17	0	45

- Date: October 31
- Location: Ohio Stadium
  Columbus, OH
- Game start: 12:00 p.m. EDT
- Elapsed time: 3:06
- Game attendance: 104,719
- Game weather: Overcast, 49 F, SW 15 MPH
- Referee: John O'Neill
- TV announcers (BTN): Matt Rosen (Play-by-play) & Anthony Herron (Color)

The Ohio State Buckeyes came to Ohio Stadium to play a game against an out of conference opponent New Mexico State. The #17 Buckeyes came in a forty-point favorite, and lived up to that prediction. Ohio State got off to a slow start, scoring no points in the first quarter. However, Ohio State came back 28 unanswered points in the second quarter. After a great first half, Pryor was taken out and Ohio State went on to score 17 more points and beat the Aggies 45–0. This was Ohio State's third shutout of the season.

2nd Quarter

- 14:56 OSU Pryor 8-yard run (Pettrey kick) 7–0 OSU
- 13:01 OSU Sanzenbacher 19-yard pass from Pryor (Pettrey kick) 14–0 OSU
- 4:44 OSU Sanzenbacher 39-yard pass from Posey (Pettrey kick) 21–0 OSU
- 0:56 OSU Saine 3-yard run (Barclay kick) 28–0 OSU

3rd Quarter

- 7:05 OSU Barclay 29-yard field goal 31–0 OSU
- 4:22 OSU Rolle fumble recovery in the end zone (Barclay kick) 38–0 OSU
- 0:05 OSU Herron 53-yard run (Barclay kick) 45–0 OSU

=== Penn State ===
#15 Ohio State at #11 Penn State

Team	1	2	3	4	Total
• #15 Ohio State	7	3	7	7	24
#11 Penn State	0	7	0	0	7

- Date: November 7
- Location: Beaver Stadium
  University Park, PA
- Game start: 3:30 p.m. EDT
- Elapsed time: 3:04
- Game attendance: 110,033
- Game weather: Sunny, 56 F, SW 8 MPH
- Referee: Dave Witvoet
- TV announcers (ABC/ESPN2): Sean McDonough (Play-by-play), Matt Millen (Color) & Holly Rowe (Sideline)

The Buckeyes headed to Pennsylvania to take on favored Penn State in a Big Ten matchup. This was Ohio State quarterback Terrelle Pryor's first game at Penn State, very near his hometown of Jeannette, and many Penn State fans had expressed their dismay that he decided to play at Ohio State. The game was a one-sided affair, with Ohio State's defense holding the Nittany Lions to just one touchdown, while the Buckeyes scored in every quarter, including two touchdown passes by Pryor. However, special teams play gave the Buckeyes the biggest boost of all, including two Ray Small punt returns that allowed Ohio State to make the game into a laugher, despite their four scoring drives totalling 178 yards. With Iowa's loss this week, the Buckeyes moved into a tie for first in the Big Ten.

1st Quarter

- 11:47 OSU Pryor 7-yard run (Barclay kick) 7–0 OSU

2nd Quarter

- 12:28 PSU Clark 1-yard run (Wagner kick) 7–7
- 5:54 OSU Barclay 37-yard field goal 10–7 OSU

3rd Quarter

- 1:47 OSU Posey 62-yard pass from Pryor (Barclay kick) 17–7 OSU

4th Quarter

- 9:37 OSU Saine 6-yard pass from Pryor (Barclay kick) 24–7 OSU

=== Iowa ===
#15 Iowa at #10 Ohio State

Team	1	2	3	4	OT	Total
#15 Iowa	3	0	7	14	0	24
• #10 Ohio State	0	10	0	14	3	27

- Date: November 14
- Location: Ohio Stadium
  Columbus, OH
- Game start: 3:30 p.m. EST
- Elapsed time: 3:06
- Game attendance: 105,455
- Game weather: 65 F, Clear, SW 4 MPH
- Referee: Todd Geerlings
- TV announcers (ABC/ESPN): Sean McDonough (Play-by-play), Matt Millen (Color) & Holly Rowe (Sideline)

The Buckeyes stayed home to take on Iowa, with an automatic BCS bowl game berth and at least a share of the Big Ten championship on the line. Both teams traded field goals, but Ohio State took the lead before halftime with a 22-yard run by Brandon Saine. Iowa struck back in the third on a 9-yard pass to Marvin McNutt from freshman QB James Vanderberg. In the fourth, the Buckeyes scored two touchdowns in under two minutes, seemingly putting the game away. However, Derrell Johnson-Koulianos returned the ensuing kickoff 99 yards for a touchdown, and Vandenberg connected with McNutt again to send the game into overtime. On their first possession, Iowa got pushed out of field goal range and ended up not scoring. Ohio State took over and Devin Barclay kicked the game-winning field goal. The Buckeyes clinched at least a share of the Big Ten title for their 5th straight year, and earned the Big Ten's automatic BCS bowl bid to the 2010 Rose Bowl.

1st Quarter

- 0:55 IOWA Murray 32-yard field goal 3–0 IOWA

2nd Quarter

- 7:06 OSU Barclay 30-yard field goal 3–3
- 2:04 OSU Saine 22-yard run (Barclay kick) 10–3 OSU

3rd Quarter

- 3:31 IOWA McNutt 9-yard pass from Vandenberg (Murray kick) 10–10

4th Quarter

- 13:03 OSU Herron 11-yard run (Barclay kick) 17–10 OSU
- 11:11 OSU Saine 50-yard run (Barclay kick) 24–10 OSU
- 10:56 IOWA Johnson-Koulianos 99-yard kickoff return (Murray kick) 24–17 OSU
- 2:42 IOWA McNutt 10-yard pass from Vandenberg (Murray kick) 24–24

Overtime

- 1OT OSU Barclay 39-yard field goal 27–24 OSU

=== Michigan ===
#9 Ohio State at Michigan

Team	1	2	3	4	Total
• #9 Ohio State	7	7	7	0	21
Michigan	0	3	7	0	10

- Date: November 21
- Location: Michigan Stadium
  Ann Arbor, MI
- Game start: 12:00 p.m. EST
- Elapsed time: 3:10
- Game attendance: 110,922
- Game weather: 52 F, Mostly Cloudy, W 12 MPH
- Referee: Dan Capron
- TV announcers (ABC): Sean McDonough (Play-by-play), Matt Millen (Color) & Holly Rowe (Sideline)

The Buckeyes headed into Ann Arbor to take on archrival Michigan in their final regular season game. The first score came by Ohio State, when Cameron Heyward recovered a Tate Forcier fumble in the end zone. Jason Olesnavage hit a field goal for Michigan, but Brandon Saine came back with a 29-yard run. Michigan and Ohio State traded touchdowns in the third, but Michigan could not recover from Forcier's four interceptions. With the win, Ohio State won the Big Ten title outright, and extended their longest winning streak ever against Michigan to six games.

1st Quarter

- 10:44 OSU Heyward fumble recovery in the end zone (Barclay kick) 7–0 OSU

2nd Quarter

- 7:59 MICH Olesnavage 46-yard field goal 7–3 OSU
- 5:22 OSU Saine 29-yard run (Barclay kick) 14–3 OSU

3rd Quarter

- 10:05 MICH Smith 18-yard pass from Forcier (Olesnavage kick) 14–10 OSU
- 4:46 OSU Herron 12-yard pass from Pryor (Barclay kick) 21–10 OSU

== 2010 Rose Bowl ==
=== Oregon ===
#8 Ohio State at #7 Oregon

Team	1	2	3	4	Total
• Ohio State	10	6	3	7	26
Oregon	0	10	7	0	17

- Date: January 1, 2010
- Location: Rose Bowl
  Pasadena, CA
- Game start: 5:10 p.m. EST
- Elapsed time: 3:11
- Game attendance: 93,963
- Game weather: Sunny, 71 F, ESE 5 MPH
- Referee: Scott Novak
- TV announcers (ABC/ESPN Radio): Brent Musburger (Play-by-play), Kirk Herbstreit (Color), & Lisa Salters (Sideline)/Mike Tirico (Play-by-play), Jon Gruden (Color), & Shelley Smith (Sideline)

Scoring summary
1	11:37	OSU	Brandon Saine 11-yard pass from Terrelle Pryor (Aaron Pettrey kick)	OSU 7–0
1	0:34	OSU	Devin Barclay 19-yard field goal	OSU 10–0
2	14:24	ORE	Morgan Flint 24-yard field goal	OSU 10–3
2	9:14	ORE	LeGarrette Blount 3-yard run (Morgan Flint kick)	Tied 10–10
2	1:05	OSU	Devin Barclay 30-yard field goal	OSU 13–10
2	0:00	OSU	Aaron Pettrey 45-yard field goal	OSU 16–10
3	11:03	ORE	Jeremiah Masoli 1-yard run (Morgan Flint kick)	ORE 17–16
3	6:36	OSU	Devin Barclay 38-yard field goal	OSU 19–17
4	7:02	OSU	DeVier Posey 17-yard pass from Terrelle Pryor (Aaron Pettrey kick)	OSU 26–17

Ohio State has played in 13 Rose Bowl Games with a record of 6–7, winning its last appearance over Arizona State 20–17. Oregon plays its fifth Rose Bowl Game and has a record of 1–3. It has not won a Rose Bowl game in 92 years since that first victory over Pennsylvania 14–0 in 1917.

Ohio State struck first, with Brandon Saine scoring on a 13-yard pass from Terrelle Pryor on the Buckeyes' first drive. Devin Barclay added a field goal near the end of the first quarter. Oregon came back to tie in the second, with a field goal by Morgan Flint and a 3-yard touchdown run by LaGarrette Blount. Ohio State retook the lead with two field goals before halftime. In the third, Jeremiah Masoli gave the Ducks their first lead with a 1-yard run. Then Barclay hit another field goal to give Ohio State the lead back. In the fourth, the Buckeyes scored another touchdown to give them a nine-point lead, and the win was sealed when Flint missed a 45-yard field goal which would have drawn the Ducks within 6. The final score was Ohio State 26, Oregon 17.

The Buckeyes set a Rose Bowl record with a time of possession of 41 minutes, 37 seconds.

== Rankings ==
Ranking movements Legend: ██ Increase in ranking ██ Decrease in ranking
	Week															
Poll	Pre	1	2	3	4	5	6	7	8	9	10	11	12	13	14	Final
AP	6	8	11	13	9	9	7	18	17	15	10	9	9	8	8	5
Coaches	6	7	11	11	9	8	7	17	15	12	8	8	8	7	8	5
Harris	Not released				8	8	7	17	15	13	8	8	8	7	7	Not released
BCS	Not released							19	17	16	11	10	10	8	8	Not released
