= Chris Martin (linebacker) =

American football player (born 1960)

No. 59, 94, 57, 53
- Position: Linebacker

Personal information
- Born: December 19, 1960 (age 65); Huntsville, Alabama, U.S.
- Listed height: 6 ft 2 in (1.88 m)
- Listed weight: 236 lb (107 kg)

Career information
- High school: Johnson (Huntsville)
- College: Auburn

Career history
- New Orleans Saints (1983); Minnesota Vikings (1984–1988); Kansas City Chiefs (1988–1992); Los Angeles Rams (1993–1994)

Awards and highlights
- Second-team All-SEC (1982)
- Stats at Pro Football Reference

Christopher Martin (born December 19, 1960) is an American former professional football player who was a linebacker in the National Football League (NFL). He played college football for the Auburn Tigers. He played in the NFL for the New Orleans Saints in 1983, for the Minnesota Vikings from 1984 to 1988, for the Kansas City Chiefs from 1988 to 1992, and for the Los Angeles Rams from 1993 to 1994.

On October 13, 1991, in a game against the Miami Dolphins, Martin scored a 100-yardtouchdown on a fumble recovery; as of the 2025 season, it is the longest fumble recovery touchdown in Kansas City Chiefs history.
