= Mike Adams (offensive tackle) =

American football player (born 1990)

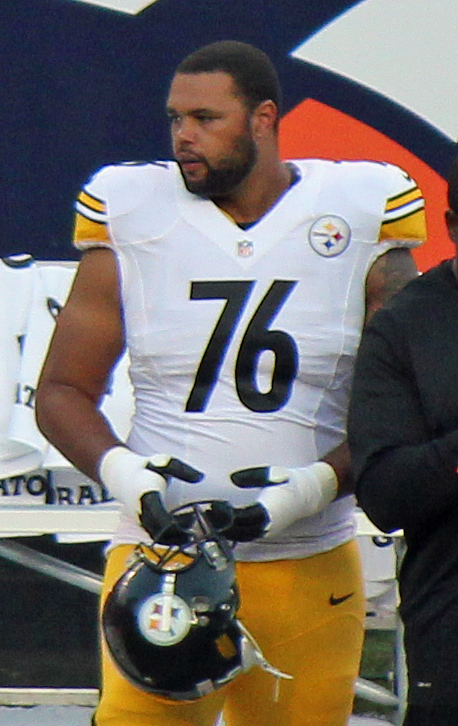
- Adams with the Pittsburgh Steelers in 2012

No. 76
- Position: Offensive tackle

Personal information
- Born: March 10, 1990 (age 36); Farrell, Pennsylvania, U.S.
- Listed height: 6 ft 7 in (2.01 m)
- Listed weight: 323 lb (147 kg)

Career information
- High school: Coffman (Dublin, Ohio)
- College: Ohio State (2008–2011)
- NFL draft: 2012: 2nd round, 56th overall pick

Career history
- Pittsburgh Steelers (2012–2015); Chicago Bears (2016)

Awards and highlights
- First-team All-Big Ten (2010); Second-team All-Big Ten (2011)

Career NFL statistics
- Games played: 53
- Games started: 21
- Stats at Pro Football Reference

Mike Adams (born March 10, 1990) is an American former professional football player who was an offensive tackle in the National Football League (NFL). He played college football for the Ohio State Buckeyes, earning first-team All-Big Ten honors in 2010. Adams was considered to be one of the best offensive tackles of his draft class.

== Early life ==
Adams attended Dublin Coffman High School in Dublin, Ohio, where he was an All-State selection as a junior and senior. Regarded as a five-star recruit by Rivals.com, Adams was listed as the No. 1 offensive tackle prospect in the class of 2008.

== Professional career ==
=== 2012 NFL draft ===
After Adams tested positive for drug use at the 2012 NFL Scouting Combine the Pittsburgh Steelers initially removed him from their draft board. Determined to be selected by his favorite team, Adams met with head coach Mike Tomlin, general manager Kevin Colbert, and team owner Art Rooney II. After professing his love for the Steelers and willingness to rectify his mistake, Adams was reconsidered. He was selected in the second round (pick 56) of the 2012 NFL draft by the Steelers]].

Pre-draft measurables
Height	Weight	Arm length	Hand span	Wingspan	40-yard dash	10-yard split	20-yard split	20-yard shuttle	Three-cone drill	Vertical jump	Broad jump	Bench press
6 ft 7 1/4 in (2.01 m)	323 lb (147 kg)	34 in (0.86 m)	10 7/8 in (0.28 m)	6 ft 10 3/4 in (2.10 m)	5.40 s	1.83 s	3.13 s	4.95 s	7.94 s	28.5 in (0.72 m)	8 ft 4 in (2.54 m)	21 reps
All values from NFL Combine/Pro Day

=== Pittsburgh Steelers ===
On May 8, 2012, the Steelers signed Adams to a four-year, $3.54 million contract with a signing bonus of $1.01 million and $1.01 million guaranteed. Adams played in his first game on September 9, 2012, against the Denver Broncos. On October 21, 2012, he received his first start in a 24–17 victory over the Cincinnati Bengals. He then started the next 5 games. He finished his rookie season with 6 starts in 10 games.

On September 8, 2013, Adams started the Steelers' season opener against the Tennessee Titans. After four consecutive starts to begin the season, he was benched due to ineffective play. He finished his second season with 10 starts in 15 games.

After beginning his third season as a back-up, Adams received his first start of the year on October 26, 2014, in a 51–34 win over the Indianapolis Colts. He would not return to his starting role until Week 13. During his third season he started 4 times in 16 games.

In early June 2015, Adams was placed on the physically unable to play list before training camp in order to recuperate from back surgery.

On May 5, 2016, Adams was released after failing a physical, ending his tumultuous career with the team.

=== Chicago Bears ===
Adams signed with the Chicago Bears on August 10, 2016. He played in 12 games with one start in 2016 before suffering a back injury and was placed on injured reserve on December 12, 2016.

== Personal life ==
Adams was stabbed in an apparent robbery attempt in the early morning hours of June 1, 2013 in Pittsburgh, Pennsylvania. He was hospitalized and made a full recovery.
