= 2002 Ohio State Buckeyes football team =

American college football season

2002 Ohio State Buckeyes football

Consensus national champion Big Ten co-champion Fiesta Bowl champion

Fiesta Bowl (BCS NCG), W 31–24 ^{2OT} vs. Miami (FL)
- Conference: Big Ten Conference

Ranking
- Coaches: No. 1
- AP: No. 1
- Record: 14–0 (8–0 Big Ten)
- Head coach: Jim Tressel (2nd season)
- Offensive coordinator: Jim Bollman (2nd season)
- Offensive scheme: Multiple
- Defensive coordinator: Mark Dantonio (2nd season)
- Base defense: 4–3
- MVPs: Chris Gamble; Craig Krenzel
- Home stadium: Ohio Stadium (Capacity: 101,568)

2002 Big Ten Conference football standings
	Conf.			Overall
Team	W		L	W		L
No. 1 Ohio State $#+	8	–	0	14	–	0
No. 8 Iowa %+	8	–	0	11	–	2
No. 9 Michigan	6	–	2	10	–	3
No. 16 Penn State	5	–	3	9	–	4
Purdue	4	–	4	7	–	6
Illinois	4	–	4	5	–	7
Minnesota	3	–	5	8	–	5
Wisconsin	2	–	6	8	–	6
Michigan State	2	–	6	4	–	8
Northwestern	1	–	7	3	–	9
Indiana	1	–	7	3	–	9
# – BCS National Champion; $ – BCS representative as conference champion; % – BCS at-large representative; + – Conference co-champions; Rankings from AP Poll

The 2002 Ohio State Buckeyes football team was an American football team that represented the Ohio State University as a member of the Big Ten Conference during the 2002 NCAA Division I-A football season. In their second year under head coach Jim Tressel, the Buckeyes compiled a perfect 14–0 record (8–0 in conference games), won the Big Ten and national championships, and outscored opponents by a total of 410 to 183. Against ranked opponents, the Buckeyes defeated No. 10 Washington State, No. 18 Penn State, No. 23 Minnesota, and No. 12 Michigan. They concluded the season with a 31–24 double-overtime victory over No. 1 Miami (FL) in the 2003 Fiesta Bowl, which was also the BCS National Championship Game. It was Ohio State's first consensus national championship since 1968.

The Buckeyes gained an average of 191.3 rushing yards and 173.2 passing yards per game. On defense, they gave up 77.7 rushing yards and 243.1 passing yards per game. The team's statistical leaders included junior quarterback Craig Krenzel (2,110 passing yards, 59.4% completion percentage), freshman tailback Maurice Clarett (1,237 rushing yards, 5.6 yards per carry), wide receiver Michael Jenkins (61 receptions for 1,076 yards), and kicker Mike Nugent (120 points scored, 45 of 46 extra points, 25 of 28 field goals). Three Ohio State players were consensus first-team All-Americans: Nugent; linebacker Matt Wilhelm; and safety Mike Doss. Seven Ohio State players received first-team honors on the 2002 All-Big Ten Conference football team: Clarett; Wilhelm; Doss; Nugent; defensive end Darrion Scott; cornerback Chris Gamble; and punter Andy Groom.

The team played its home games at Ohio Stadium in Columbus, Ohio.

== Schedule ==
Date	Time	Opponent	Rank	Site	TV	Result	Attendance
August 24	2:30 p.m.	Texas Tech*	No. 13	Ohio Stadium; Columbus, OH (Pigskin Classic)	ABC	W 45–21	100,037
September 7	12:00 p.m.	Kent State*	No. 8	Ohio Stadium; Columbus, OH	ESPN Plus	W 51–17	98,689
September 14	3:30 p.m.	No. 10 Washington State*	No. 6	Ohio Stadium; Columbus, OH (College GameDay)	ABC	W 25–7	104,553
September 21	3:30 p.m.	at Cincinnati*	No. 6	Paul Brown Stadium; Cincinnati, OH	ESPN	W 23–19	66,319
September 28	12:00 p.m.	Indiana	No. 6	Ohio Stadium; Columbus, OH	ESPN Plus	W 45–17	104,194
October 5	7:00 p.m.	at Northwestern	No. 5	Ryan Field; Evanston, IL	ESPN2	W 27–16	43,489
October 12	12:00 p.m.	San Jose State*^{†}	No. 5	Ohio Stadium; Columbus, OH	ESPN Plus	W 50–7	104,892
October 19	3:30 p.m.	at Wisconsin	No. 4	Camp Randall Stadium; Madison, WI	ABC	W 19–14	79,729
October 26	3:30 p.m.	No. 17 Penn State	No. 6	Ohio Stadium; Columbus, OH (rivalry)	ABC	W 13–7	105,103
November 2	3:30 p.m.	No. 23 Minnesota	No. 5	Ohio Stadium; Columbus, OH	ABC	W 34–3	104,897
November 9	12:00 p.m.	at Purdue	No. 2	Ross–Ade Stadium; West Lafayette, IN (Holy Buckeye)	ABC	W 10–6	65,250
November 16	3:30 p.m.	at Illinois	No. 1	Memorial Stadium; Champaign, IL (Illibuck)	ABC	W 23–16 ^{OT}	58,810
November 23	12:00 p.m.	No. 9 Michigan	No. 2	Ohio Stadium; Columbus, OH (rivalry, College GameDay)	ABC	W 14–9	105,539
January 3, 2003	8:00 p.m.	vs. No. 1 Miami (FL)*	No. 2	Sun Devil Stadium; Tempe, AZ (Fiesta Bowl—BCS National Championship Game)	ABC	W 31–24 ^{2OT}	77,502
*Non-conference game; ^{†}Homecoming; Rankings from AP Poll released prior to the game; All times are in Eastern time

== Rankings ==
Ranking movements Legend: ██ Increase in ranking ██ Decrease in ranking ( ) = First-place votes
	Week																	
Poll	Pre	1	2	3	4	5	6	7	8	9	10	11	12	13	14	15	16	Final
AP	13	10	8	6	6	6	5	5	4	4	6	3	2	2	2	2	2	1 (71)
Coaches	12	11	9	8	6	6	5	5	4	4	4	3	2	2	2 (1)	2 (1)	2	1 (61)
BCS	Not released									6	5	2	1	2	2	2	2	Not released

== Preseason ==
Despite a 7–5 season the year before, the general feeling was one of optimism in Columbus, Ohio, provided that the defense could carry the team while the offense developed. First year coach Jim Tressel was able to deliver on his promise of an upset victory over the University of Michigan in Ann Arbor. Twice All-American safety Mike Doss, in an emotional announcement on January 9, 2002, advised that he would not declare himself for the NFL draft and would return to Ohio State for his senior season. (SI, p. 75) Maurice Clarett, a freshman prospect, graduated early from high school and enrolled at Ohio State for the 2002 Winter Quarter to make himself eligible to participate in spring football practice. (Lindy's, p. 15; SI p. 16)

Prior to the 2002 season, the Buckeyes were ranked thirteenth in the AP Poll after losing the Outback Bowl on a last second field goal to the South Carolina Gamecocks. The Big Ten Conference summer media day sessions predicted Ohio State to finish second in the conference behind Michigan and ahead of Michigan State. (Keels, p. 12)

Team captains selected were seniors Mike Doss and Donnie Nickey. Offensive captains for the season were named weekly, and were: Craig Krenzel (Texas Tech, Penn State, and Michigan), Mike Stafford (Kent State), Ben Hartsock (Washington State and Illinois), Ivan Douglas (Cincinnati), Chris Vance (Indiana), Alex Stepanovich (Northwestern and Purdue), Michael Jenkins (San Jose State), Shane Olivea (Wisconsin), and for the Minnesota game, Andy Groom and Bryce Bishop. (2002 archive October 12, 2002)

== Game summaries ==
=== Texas Tech ===
Team	1	2	3	4	Total
Texas Tech	7	0	0	14	21
• Ohio State	14	7	17	7	45

- Date: August 24
- Location: Ohio Stadium, Columbus, Ohio
- Game start: 2:30 PM EDT
- Elapsed time: 3:10
- Game attendance: 100,037
- Game weather: 83°, pleasant, winds 5–7 NW
- Referee: Rich Kollen
- TV announcers (ABC): Brad Nessler, Bob Griese, & Lynn Swann

Scoring summary
1	10:53	OSU	Lydell Ross 2-yard run (Mike Nugent kick)	OSU 7–0
1	5:10	OSU	Maurice Clarett 59-yard run (Mike Nugent kick)	OSU 14–0
1	0:00	TT	Carlos Francis 37-yard pass from Kliff Kingsbury (Robert Treece kick)	OSU 14–7
2	7:40	OSU	Lydell Ross 1-yard run (Mike Nugent kick)	OSU 21–7
3	13:08	OSU	Maurice Clarett 45-yard run (Mike Nugent kick)	OSU 28–7
3	6:46	OSU	Mike Nugent 45-yard field goal	OSU 31–7
3	1:56	OSU	Maurice Clarett 1-yard run (Mike Nugent kick)	OSU 38–7
4	9:23	TT	Wes Welker 34-yard pass from Kliff Kingsbury (B.J. Symons to Josh Page)	OSU 38–15
4	2:24	OSU	Scott McMullen 1-yard run (Mike Nugent kick)	OSU 45–15
4	0:12	TT	Wes Welker 36-yard pass from Kliff Kingsbury (pass failed)	OSU 45–21

The Buckeyes began the 2002 season in Ohio Stadium against the Texas Tech Red Raiders on August 24, 2002, in the final edition of the Pigskin Classic. Like Ohio State, Texas Tech had posted a 7–5 record in 2001, narrowly losing to Iowa in the Alamo Bowl. Tailback Maurice Clarett, the first true freshman to start at tailback in school history, (Athletic Department archive August 24, 2002) scored three touchdowns in his first game, sparking a convincing 45–21 win. Seven sacks of Heisman Trophy candidate Kliff Kingsbury and containment of the Tech offense until late in the game did much to establish the credibility of the Buckeye defense.

=== Kent State ===
Team	1	2	3	4	Total
Kent State	0	14	0	3	17
• Ohio State	21	17	3	10	51

- Date: September 7
- Location: Ohio Stadium, Columbus, Ohio
- Game start: 12:00 PM EDT
- Elapsed time: 3:05
- Game attendance: 98,689
- Game weather: 86°, clear, winds SW 2 mph
- Referee: Jim Lapetina
- TV announcers (ESPN+): Jim Barbar, Al Harris, and Anthony Calhoun

Scoring summary
1	12:16	OSU	Maurice Clarett 2-yard run (Mike Nugent kick)	OSU 7–0
1	9:17	OSU	Mike Doss 45-yard interception return (Mike Nugent kick)	OSU 14–0
1	10:25	OSU	Maurice Hall 28-yard run (Mike Nugent kick)	OSU 21–0
2	13:57	OSU	Maurice Clarett 7-yard pass from Craig Krenzel (Mike Nugent kick)	OSU 28–0
2	9:05	OSU	Mike Nugent 40-yard field goal	OSU 31–0
2	7:31	OSU	A. J. Hawk 34-yard interception return (Mike Nugent kick)	OSU 38–0
2	3:11	KSU	Daryl Moore 28-yard pass from Joshua Cribbs (Travis Mayle kick)	OSU 38–7
2	0:34	KSU	Antonio King 8-yard pass from Joshua Cribbs (Travis Mayle kick)	OSU 38–14
3	11:49	OSU	Mike Nugent 33-yard field goal	OSU 41–14
4	14:56	OSU	Mike Nugent 45-yard field goal	OSU 44–14
4	7:25	KSU	Travis Mayle 33-yard field goal	OSU 44–17
4	4:09	OSU	Ryan Hamby 10-yard pass from Scott McMullen (Mike Nugent kick)	OSU 51–17

Ohio State, now ranked 8th in the AP Poll, built a 38–0 lead before halftime against the Kent State Golden Flashes, with quarterback Craig Krenzel completing his first 11 passes, safety Mike Doss and freshman linebacker A. J. Hawk returning interceptions for touchdowns, and Maurice Clarett scoring twice. Kent State scored twice in the last 4 minutes of the first half but never threatened an upset. With the game in hand, backup quarterback Scott McMullen directed the Buckeye offense for much of the second half, completing 7 of his 11 passes. The Buckeyes took only 47 snaps compared to 80 by the Golden Flashes and actually had a 2:1 deficit in time of possession, but outgained Kent State by 60 yards. Sophomore place kicker Mike Nugent, who had been uneven in his kicking as a freshman, gave an indication of his future value to the team by kicking field goals of 41, 33, and 45 yards.

=== Washington State ===
Team	1	2	3	4	Total
Washington State	7	0	0	0	7
• Ohio State	3	3	12	7	25

- Date: September 14
- Location: Ohio Stadium, Columbus, Ohio
- Game start: 3:30 PM EDT
- Elapsed time: 2:54
- Game attendance: 104,553
- Game weather: 85°, partly cloudy, winds 15 mph SW
- Referee: Dick Honig
- TV announcers (ABC): Brent Musburger, Gary Danielson & Jack Arute

Now ranked sixth in the nation, the Buckeyes faced their first marquee opponent and second Heisman quarterback candidate in Jason Gesser on September 14 when they hosted the 10th-ranked Cougars of Washington State. The game was billed by many in the media as a possible Rose Bowl-preview and was televised nationally (Keels p. 28).

Washington State appeared to live up to its billing with an 11-play 80-yard drive midway through the 1st quarter that was capped by a short touchdown pass from Gesser. In addition the Cougar defense limited tailback Maurice Clarett to just 36 yards rushing and held the Buckeyes to only a pair of field goals in the half. However Ohio State's defense stymied Washington State throughout the game, intercepting Gesser twice and forcing the Cougars to surrender the ball on downs twice in Buckeye territory.

In the second half Clarett picked up 44 yards on his first rush and destroyed the Cougar defense with 194 second-half yards. His 230 yards rushing for the day was the 6th best in Buckeye history and just short of Archie Griffin's freshman record of 239. (Keels p. 28, Lindy's p. 26) He scored twice and Ohio State got a Nugent field goal and a safety to win convincingly. The following Tuesday, in his weekly luncheon with the media, Coach Jim Tressel revealed that Clarett had suffered a knee injury during the game, had already undergone arthroscopic surgery, and would miss the next game.

=== Cincinnati ===
Team	1	2	3	4	Total
• Ohio State	0	7	7	9	23
Cincinnati	9	3	7	0	19

- Date: September 21
- Location: Paul Brown Stadium, Cincinnati
- Game start: 3:30 PM EDT
- Elapsed time: 3:20
- Game attendance: 66,319
- Game weather: 75°, sunny and pleasant, winds 5 mph W
- Referee: R.G. Detiller
- TV announcers (ESPN): Jeff Hullinger, Todd Christensen & Stacy Paetz

Ohio State won a very close game 23 - 19 against the Cincinnati Bearcats on September 21. The Cincinnati Bearcats were unranked in Conference USA, had a current 1 - 1 record and had lost the previous week to West Virginia by a field goal. The victory was ultimately sealed by an interception in the end zone by safety Will Allen with 32 seconds remaining. Ohio State were behind much of the game with the Cincinnati Bearcats creating over 400 yards of offense, including 52 passes although conceding two 4th quarter interceptions and multiple dropped passes.

Sophomore running back Lydell Ross, starting in place of the injured Clarett, rushed for 130 yards. Wide receiver Chris Gamble had practiced all week as a defensive back and was used on a 3rd down for UC from the Ohio State 29 in the 4th quarter, making an interception in the end zone. Craig Krenzel, who had scrambled for 64 yards on 14 carries in the first three games, scored the winning touchdown with less than 4 minutes to play, twisting and spinning through the Bearcat defenders for 6 yards. (Keels p. 35)

=== Indiana ===
Team	1	2	3	4	Total
Indiana	0	10	0	7	17
• Ohio State	7	14	17	7	45

- Date: September 28
- Location: Ohio Stadium, Columbus, Ohio
- Game start: 12:00 PM EDT
- Elapsed time: 2:49
- Game attendance: 104,194
- Game weather: 65°, partly cloudy, winds 8 mph W-NE
- Referee: Bill LaMonnier
- TV announcers (ESPN+): Wayne Larrivee & Randy Wright

6th-ranked and undefeated Ohio State took care of business in opening the Big Ten schedule with a 45–17 win over the 2–2 Indiana Hoosiers. Maurice Clarett returned to play after 2 weeks recuperating from his knee surgery September 16 and scored three times in the first half while accruing 104 yards rushing. After leading only 21–10 at halftime, Ohio State blew open the game with three scores in the 3rd quarter to win decisively, totalling 244 yards of rushing and 461 overall.

Playing both defense and offense, Chris Gamble scored on a 43-yard reverse on the first drive of the 3rd quarter. Indiana had to punt on the ensuing possession and safety Dustin Fox blocked the kick. Ohio State took over at the Indiana 18 and scored on a short pass from Krenzel to Michael Jenkins to take a 35–10 lead.

=== Northwestern ===
Team	1	2	3	4	Total
• Ohio State	0	14	10	3	27
Northwestern	6	3	7	0	16

- Date: October 5
- Location: Ryan Field, Evanston, Illinois
- Game start: 7:00 PM EDT
- Elapsed time: 3:13
- Game attendance: 43,489
- Game weather: 62°, clear, winds 5 mph W
- Referee: Dennis Lipski
- TV announcers (ESPN2): Dave Barnett, Bill Curry, David Norrie, & Alex Flanagan

The next week, on the road against the Northwestern Wildcats, which entered the game with a 2–3 record and 0–1 in conference play, Ohio State played a night game in Evanston, Illinois, in accordance with a scheduling agreement between the Big Ten and ESPN (Keels, p. 41). The game was again unusually close, with Clarett fumbling three times and caught by the TV cameras arguing with running backs coach Tim Spencer on the sidelines (Keels, p. 42), but he also carried the ball for 140 yards and two scores as Ohio State prevailed 27–16.

Northwestern had a 6–0 lead after the 1st quarter but had had two drives stopped inside the Ohio State ten-yard line. They later missed a pair of field goal attempts before scoring a touchdown with less than 2 minutes remaining in the 3rd quarter to narrow the Buckeye lead to 24–16. Ohio State replied with a long drive and a field goal by Mike Nugent, then used an interception by Cie Grant and a fumble recovery by Donnie Nickey to keep Northwestern at bay.

=== San Jose State ===
Team	1	2	3	4	Total
San Jose State	0	7	0	0	7
• Ohio State	7	17	17	9	50

- Date: October 12
- Location: Ohio Stadium, Columbus, Ohio
- Game start: 12:00 PM EDT
- Elapsed time: 2:59
- Game attendance: 104,892
- Game weather: 68°, partly cloudy, winds vary 3 mph,
- Referee: Steve Pamon
- TV announcers (ESPN+): Jim Barbar, Al Harris & Anthony Calhoun

Ohio State for the second season in a row played a non-conference West Coast team at mid-season, hosting the San Jose State Spartans for Homecoming on October 12. San Jose State had attempted to cancel the game because its schedule featured seven road games in an 8-week span, but was unable to find a replacement team for the Buckeye home date. The Spartans, 4–2, had already defeated Illinois, had a three-game winning streak, and entered the game with a defense that led Division I-A in taking the ball away from its opponents. The game started slowly and was tied 7–7 early in the 2nd quarter.

The Buckeye defense, however, held SJS to 265 yards of offense, all of it passing yardage, despite the Spartans completing 81.8% of their 44 passes. (Lindy's, p. 42) The offense ran up 567 yards, a season-high, with Krenzel and backup Scott McMullen combining for 355 yards passing on only 19 completions. Krenzel threw for three touchdowns to break the game open in the 3rd quarter, Clarett rushed for 132 yards and scored three times, and Mike Nugent connected on three field goals, tying the school record for 15 straight without a miss.

=== Wisconsin ===
Team	1	2	3	4	Total
• Ohio State	10	3	0	6	19
Wisconsin	7	7	0	0	14

- Date: October 19
- Location: Camp Randall Stadium, Madison, Wisconsin
- Game start: 3:30 PM EDT
- Elapsed time: 2:50
- Game attendance: 79,729
- Game weather: 42°, cloudy, winds 10 mph NE
- Referee: Dick Honig
- TV announcers (ABC): Brent Musburger, Gary Danielson, & Jack Arute

Ohio State faced its next big test on the road October 19, in Madison, Wisconsin, taking on the Wisconsin Badgers in one of the most hostile stadiums in the nation. Ranked fourth now, Ohio State faced a Badger team that had opened its season 5–0, but had lost its first two conference games, and 7 of its last 9 conference games at home, and was playing without its top wide receiver, Lee Evans. Animosity simmered in both teams as each had resented the other dancing on their logos after road wins in the immediately preceding years. (Keels p. 46)

Ohio State scored on its first possession with a long pass from Krenzel to Jenkins, but by halftime Wisconsin led, 14–13, on two long plays in each quarter. The 3rd quarter was scoreless, but midway through the 4th, on a 3rd and 6 from its own 16, Krenzel delivered a high pass 45 yards to Michael Jenkins, who out-jumped two defenders to give the Buckeyes a first down in Wisconsin territory. Krenzel completed the drive with a short touchdown pass to tight end Ben Hartsock, and although a try for a 2-point conversion failed, the Buckeyes led 19–14.

Wide receiver Chris Gamble, who had played defensive back on key downs earlier in the season, was sent into the game when Wisconsin faced a 3-and-11 at the Buckeye 29-yard line. Gamble intercepted the next pass in the end zone to preserve the lead. Also a key player in the victory was punter Andy Groom, whose six punts averaged 50.2 yards, with a 4th quarter punt that went for 74 yards and another that was downed at the Wisconsin 1-yard line. Maurice Clarett rushed for 133 yards but suffered a shoulder stinger on his last carry, an injury that would severely limit his availability over the next four games.

=== Penn State ===
#17 Penn State Nittany Lions (5–2) at #4 Ohio State Buckeyes (8–0)

Quarter	1	2	3	4	Total
Penn St	7	0	0	0	7
Ohio St	0	3	10	0	13

at Ohio Stadium • Columbus, Ohio

- Date: October 26
- Game time: 3:30 p.m. EDT
- Game weather: Mostly cloudy • 52 °F (11 °C) • Wind W/NW 6 miles per hour (9.7 km/h; 5.2 kn)
- Game attendance: 105,103
- Referee: Bill LeMonnier
- TV announcers (ABC): Brent Musburger, Gary Danielson & Jack Arute

Game information

Penn St

- Zack Mills
  14/28, 98 Yds, 3 INT
- Larry Johnson
  16 Rush, 66 yds, TD
  6 Rec, 32 Yds

Ohio St

- Craig Krenzel
  13/20, 112 Yds, 2 INT
- Lydell Ross
  21 Rush, 40 Yds
- Michael Jenkins
  3 Rec, 34 Yds

The following week, on October 26, the Buckeyes returned to Columbus to face Joe Paterno's Penn State Nittany Lions, ranked 17th in the AP, with a 5–2 overall record and a 1–2 conference record, its losses to Iowa and Michigan. The Ohio State offense struggled throughout the game, exemplified by Craig Krenzel losing a fumble at the Penn State one on Ohio State's first possession, but the defense held Penn State's offense to only seven points and a season-low 179 yards and 8 first downs (tying the Penn State school record for fewest first downs, which surprisingly occurred in Penn State's memorable 14–10 upset of the Miami Hurricanes in the 1987 Fiesta Bowl that grabbed them the national championship). Heisman Trophy finalist Larry Johnson was held to a season-low 66 yards rushing on 16 attempts.

The game featured Chris Gamble starting on both offense and defense (which had last occurred for Ohio State in 1963) and playing 89 of the game's 138 plays (51 on defense, 31 on offense, and 7 on punt returns). (Lindy's p. 50) After Krenzel's fumble, Gamble caught the Penn State defender from behind at the OSU 41, preventing a touchdown return, and two plays later A. J. Hawk ended the threat with his second interception of the year.

The key play of the game, however, came on the first series of the 3rd quarter with Penn State in possession and having the lead, 7–3. Gamble "jumped the route" of the Penn State receiver, intercepted the ball at the Nittany Lion 40, and returned it down the sideline for a touchdown, the only one scored by Ohio State in the game. In all the Buckeyes intercepted three passes, but controversy ensued near the end of the game when Gamble appeared to interfere with a Lion receiver but was not called for a penalty. (Lindy's, p. 50) Clarett played only the first series of the game before injuring his shoulder again and leaving the game.

Buckeye radio broadcaster Paul Keels, in his book recounting the season, noted that the fans in Ohio Stadium that day were unusually loud and supportive. (P. 53)

Scoring summary

Quarter	Time	Drive			Team	Scoring information	Score	
Quarter	Time	Plays	Yards	TOP	Team	Scoring information	PSU	OSU
1	0:36	9	80	2:34	Penn St	Larry Johnson 5-yard touchdown run, Robbie Gould kick good	7	0
2	6:16	6	13	2:41	Ohio St	37-yard field goal by Mike Nugent	7	3
3	13:07				Ohio St	Interception returned 40 yards for touchdown by Chris Gamble, Mike Nugent kick good	7	10
3	1:05	14	72	8:21	Ohio St	37-yard field goal by Mike Nugent	7	13
"TOP" = time of possession. For other American football terms, see Glossary of American football.							7	13

=== Minnesota ===
Team	1	2	3	4	Total
Minnesota	3	0	0	0	3
• Ohio State	0	10	17	7	34

- Date: November 2
- Location: Ohio Stadium, Columbus, Ohio
- Game start: 3:30 PM EDT
- Elapsed time: 3:01
- Game attendance: 104,897
- Game weather: 45°, clear/windy, winds 16 mph W/SW
- Referee: Steve Newman
- TV announcers (ABC): Brad Nessler, Bob Griese & Lynn Swann

The team was far more dominant on November 2, posting an impressive 34–3 rout of the 19th-ranked Minnesota Golden Gophers. Minnesota, at 7–1 overall and 3–1 in conference play, was a contender for the Big Ten title. The Gophers blocked a punt that led to the first score of the day, a field goal, but Ohio State's defense throttled the Minnesota rushing attack, which had been averaging 271 yards a game, (Lindy's, p. 54) holding it to 53 yards and the passing attack to 59, and Minnesota, despite starting its next two possessions at its 45, was unable to score further.

Lydell Ross and Maurice Hall, playing in place of the injured Clarett, rushed for 89 and 93 yards respectively, as Ohio State scored 34 unanswered points. Defensive linemen Darrion Scott, Simon Fraser, and David Thompson recorded 4 sacks and were instrumental in stopping the run.

=== Purdue ===
#3 Ohio State Buckeyes (10–0) at Purdue Boilermakers (4–5)

Quarter	1	2	3	4	Total
Ohio St	0	3	0	7	10
Purdue	3	0	0	3	6

at Ross–Ade Stadium, West Lafayette, Indiana

- Date: November 9, 2002
- Game time: 12:00 p.m.
- Game weather: Mostly cloudy, 63 °F (17 °C)
- Game attendance: 65,250
- Referee: Dennis Lipski
- TV announcers (ABC): Brent Musburger, Gary Danielson, and Jack Arute

Game information

First quarter

- PUR – Berin Lacevic 21-yard field goal, 0:42. Purdue 3–0. Drive: 6 plays, 19 yards, 1:57.

Second quarter

- OSU – Mike Nugent 22-yard field goal, 0:00. Tie 3–3. Drive: 9 plays, 36 yards, 3:15.

Fourth quarter

- PUR – Berin Lacevic 32-yard field goal, 7:50. Purdue 6–3. Drive: 8 plays, 65 yards, 4:18.
- OSU – Michael Jenkins 37-yard pass from Craig Krenzel (Mike Nugent kick), 1:36. Ohio St 10–6. Drive: 4 plays, 46 yards, 1:34.

Top passers

- OSU – Craig Krenzel – 13/20, 173 yards, TD, INT
- PUR – Kyle Orton – 18/28, 169 yards, 3 INT

Top rushers

- OSU – Maurice Clarett – 14 rushes, 52 yards
- PUR – Brandon Jones – 11 rushes, 28 yards

Top receivers

- OSU – Michael Jenkins – 5 receptions, 87 yards, TD
- PUR – Taylor Stubblefield – 7 receptions, 63 yards

On November 9, the 3rd-ranked Buckeyes, in an unexpectedly close game with the 4–5 Purdue Boilermakers (2–3 in Big Ten play), delivered one of the most thrilling moments in Ohio State football history. The offense had been stagnant the entire game, unable to run against the Purdue defense. Maurice Clarett, still hampered by the recurrence of his stinger injury in the Penn State game, carried the ball only 14 times for 52 yards. Krenzel had completed only 11 passes for 123 yards when Ohio State faced a 3rd and 14 from midfield, trailing 6–3 late in the fourth quarter. He scrambled in the passing pocket and completed a pass along the sideline to tight end Ben Hartsock but came up a yard short of a first down at the 37-yard line with just over 2:00 remaining in the game.

On fourth down with a yard to go, coach Jim Tressel opted against attempting a 54-yard field goal by Mike Nugent to tie the game, and in an uncharacteristically high-risk move, ran pass play "King Right 64 Y Shallow Swap" instead, whose first option was a short crossing pass ("shallow swap") to Hartsock (the "Y" receiver). Instead, Krenzel went deep to wide receiver Michael Jenkins, jostling with defensive back Antwaun Rogers. Jenkins caught the pass at the goal line and scored. After a Gamble interception of Purdue quarterback Kyle Orton stifled any comeback by the Boilermakers, the Buckeyes escaped West Lafayette with a victory, 10–6. From his call of the touchdown, ABC announcer Brent Musburger uttered a phrase that has gone down in Buckeye lore: "Holy Buckeye".

The Buckeye defense was equally stellar, limiting Purdue to a pair of field goals on four possessions inside the Ohio State 20, and an interception by middle linebacker Matt Wilhelm allowed Mike Nugent to kick a tying field goal as the clock ran out in the first half.

=== Illinois ===
Illibuck

Team	1	2	3	4	OT	Total
• Ohio State	6	0	7	3	7	23
Illinois	0	3	10	3	0	16

- Date: November 16
- Location: Memorial Stadium, Champaign, Illinois
- Game start: 3:30 PM EDT
- Elapsed time: 3:23
- Game attendance: 58,810
- Game weather: 40°, partly cloudy, winds 14 mph N
- Referee: Dave Witvoet
- TV announcers (ABC): Brent Musburger, Gary Danielson & Jack Arute

The Buckeyes had risen in the polls to now rank 2nd, and concluded their season road games in Champaign, Illinois, taking on the 4–6 Illinois Fighting Illini. Illinois was 3–3 in conference play, and what seemed to be a mismatch proved to be yet another dangerously close game as the Illini kicked a field goal on the last play of the 4th quarter to come from behind to force overtime.

As it had on its earlier road games, Ohio State struggled offensively with an inconsistent running game minus Maurice Clarett. Illinois took the lead in the 3rd quarter, only to lose it on a 50-yard strike from Krenzel to Jenkins. The teams exchanged field goals before Illinois missed a 59-yard attempt with only 2 minutes left that appeared to settle the game, but the Illini forced a punt and tied the game as time expired in regulation play.

The overtime game was the first ever played by Ohio State, and on the opening possession the Buckeyes scored, with Krenzel scrambling from the pocket for 14 yards and Maurice Hall scoring on an 8-yard run up the middle. The Illini appeared to make two touchdown receptions in their possession but the first was out-of-bounds and the second a bobbled incompletion. Defensive lineman Tim Anderson knocked down the final attempt to keep the Buckeyes undefeated. (Lindy's p. 62: Keels, p. 74–75)

=== Michigan ===
#12 Michigan Wolverines (9–2) at #2 Ohio State Buckeyes (12–0)

Quarter	1	2	3	4	Total
Michigan	3	6	0	0	9
Ohio St	7	0	0	7	14

at Ohio Stadium, Columbus, Ohio

- Date: November 23, 2002
- Game time: 12:00 p.m. EST
- Game weather: Cloudy, 38 °F (3 °C)
- Game attendance: 105,539
- Referee: Jim Lapetina
- TV announcers (ABC): Brent Musburger, Gary Danielson, and Jack Arute

Game information

First quarter

- MICH – Adam Finley 36-yard field goal, 8:35. Michigan 3–0. Drive: 12 plays, 41 yards, 4:30.
- OSU – Maurice Clarett 2-yard run (Mike Nugent kick), 2:56. Ohio St 7–3. Drive: 10 plays, 76 yards, 5:30.

Second quarter

- MICH – Adam Finley 35-yard field goal, 10:56. Ohio St 7–6. Drive: 16 plays, 62 yards, 6:55.
- MICH – Adam Finley 22-yard field goal, 0:16. Michigan 9–7. Drive: 19 plays, 88 yards, 8:24.

Fourth quarter

- OSU – Maurice Hall 3-yard run (Mike Nugent kick), 4:55. Ohio St 14–9. Drive: 8 plays, 57 yards, 3:35.

Top passers

- MICH – John Navarre – 23/46, 247 yards, INT
- OSU – Craig Krenzel – 10/14, 124 yards

Top rushers

- MICH – Chris Perry – 28 rushes, 76 yards
- OSU – Maurice Clarett – 20 rushes, 119 yards, TD

Top receivers

- MICH – Braylon Edwards – 10 receptions, 107 yards
- OSU – Michael Jenkins – 4 receptions, 51 yards

The regular season finale against the Michigan Wolverines on November 23 logically became the most important of the regular season. Michigan was 9–2, with a 6–1 Big Ten record, and ranked 9th in the USA Today poll and 12th in the AP. The intensity of the Michigan-Ohio State rivalry was increased by the stakes: a victory by the 12–0 Buckeyes would secure a Big Ten Championship and a spot for them in the BCS National Championship game. Michigan had ruined Ohio State attempts at undefeated regular seasons three times in the past decade (1993, 1995, 1996), and hoped to spoil yet another national title bid.

The game was fittingly intense, with the Wolverines ahead or within striking distance of the Buckeyes for the entire game. Maurice Clarett, returning from injury, scored an early touchdown to put the team ahead 7–3, and the defense held Michigan to three first half field goals that included a crucial stop inside the Ohio State ten just before the half. Trailing 9–7 in the fourth quarter, Krenzel engineered a drive from the Michigan 43 with 8:30 remaining. After gaining a first down on a 4th down quarterback sneak, Krenzel completed a pass (and another play name went into Buckeye legend: Gun Switch Right Dart 59 X Skinny Wheel) to Clarett swinging left out of the backfield ("wheel") while the wide receiver ran a post pattern to decoy the secondary ("X skinny") that resulted in a first down at the Michigan six-yard line. Two plays later, with 4:55 to go, Maurice Hall took an option pitch from Krenzel and ran into the endzone from two yards out.

After a lost fumble with two minutes remaining, Michigan regained possession at its own 20 with only 50 seconds. They moved the ball, but the final pass attempt by Michigan quarterback John Navarre, with 0:01 left and long to the endzone, was intercepted by Will Allen.

With the victory, Ohio State finished the 2002 season by splitting the conference crown with the Iowa Hawkeyes, who also went undefeated in Big Ten play.

=== Fiesta Bowl ===
Team	1	2	3	4	OT	Total
• Ohio State	0	14	3	0	14	31
Miami (FL)	7	0	7	3	7	24

- Date: January 3
- Location: Sun Devil Stadium, Tempe, Arizona
- Game start: 8:00 PM EDT
- Elapsed time: 3:56
- Game attendance: 77,502
- Game weather: 70°, beautiful, winds 9 mph W
- Referee: Randy Christal
- TV announcers (A): Keith Jackson, Dan Fouts, Lynn Swann, & Todd Harris

Following their defeat of Michigan, Ohio State faced the number one ranked and heavily favored (11.5 points) Miami Hurricanes in the Fiesta Bowl on January 3, 2003, selected that year as the championship game for the teams ranked first and second in the BCS ratings. The Hurricanes were attempting to win their second consecutive championship, winning the Rose Bowl in the previous season and winning 34 straight games in dominating fashion. Led by Heisman Trophy finalists quarterback Ken Dorsey and tailback Willis McGahee, Miami was favored by nearly two touchdowns over the offensively anemic Buckeyes.

The Hurricanes jumped out to an early 7–0 lead, quieting the largely scarlet and gray crowd. The second quarter, however, belonged to Ohio State, with a Mike Doss interception setting up a Craig Krenzel touchdown run which was followed by a Ken Dorsey fumble setting up the Buckeyes on the Miami 14. A Maurice Clarett touchdown run put Ohio State ahead 14–7 at halftime.

The Hurricanes stalled on their opening drive of the half, handing the ball over to Ohio State who drove inside the Miami ten-yard line before Krenzel was intercepted by Sean Taylor, who was then stripped of the ball by Maurice Clarett on the return. The Buckeyes settled for a field goal and a ten-point lead.

A Willis McGahee touchdown run brought the Hurricanes within 3 points by the beginning of the fourth quarter. On third down a catch by Chris Gamble was ruled incomplete due to his being out of bounds. Replays however seem to show that: 1) Gamble had his jersey grabbed on this play which could have resulted in pass interference call and a consequent Ohio State first down. 2) Gamble appeared to land inbounds, again a first down. With a first down Ohio State would have been in a position to run the clock out and win the game without it going to overtime. Instead they had to punt and Groom punted the ball 44 yards. Todd Sievers kicked a field goal to send the game into overtime.

On their first possession in overtime, the Hurricanes scored a touchdown on a 7-yard pass to Kellen Winslow. After a controversial pass interference call that would have given the Hurricanes a national title, Ohio State tied the game on their first possession of overtime, with Krenzel plunging 1 yard into the endzone. On their subsequent possession, Clarett would scamper 5 yards to put Ohio State ahead. Miami (Fl) had one last possession to tie the game, however Ohio State forced a lame duck throw out of the hands of Dorsey, killing Miami (Fl)'s national title hopes.

== Personnel ==
=== Coaching staff ===
- Jim Tressel – Head coach – 2nd year
- Jim Bollman – Offensive line / offensive coordinator (2nd year)
- Bill Conley – Tight ends / recruiting coordinator (16th year)
- Joe Daniels – Quarterbacks (2nd year)
- Mark Dantonio – Defensive coordinator (2nd year)
- Luke Fickell – Special teams (2nd year)
- Jim Heacock – Defensive line (7th year)
- Mark Snyder – Defensive linebackers (2nd year)
- Tim Spencer – Running backs (9th year)
- Mel Tucker – Defensive backs (2nd year)
- Bob Tucker – Director of football operations (8th year)
- Dick Tressel – Associate director of football operations (2nd year)

=== Roster ===
2002 Ohio State Buckeyes football team roster
Players
Coaches
Offense

Pos.	#	Name	Class
FB	49	John Adams	So
RB	19	Anthony Jones	Fr
TE	83	Redgie Arden	Fr
G	78	Bryce Bishop	Jr
OL	51	Mike Bogart	Jr
TE	87	Jason Caldwell	So
SE	8	Drew Carter	Jr
FL	14	Angelo Chattams	So
FL	3	Bam Childress	So
TB	13	Maurice Clarett	Fr
G	63	Adrien Clarke	Jr
TE	81	R.J. Coleman	Fr
OL	59	John Conroy	Fr
OT	79	Ryan Cook	Fr
OT	66	Doug Datish	Fr
TB	36	Michael DeMaria	So
OT	53	Ivan Douglas	Jr
OL	72	T.J. Downing	Fr
SE	7	Chris Gamble	So
TB	28	Maurice Hall	So
WR	82	Roy Hall	Fr
TE	80	Ryan Hamby	Fr
TE	88	Ben Hartsock	Jr
SE	84	John Hollins	So
WR	17	Santonio Holmes	Fr
WR	81	Andre Hooks	So
SE	12	Michael Jenkins	Jr
FB	38	Branden Joe	So
RB	29	Jesse Kline	Jr
OT	52	Mike Kne	Jr
WR	17	Craig Kolk	Fr
QB	16	Craig Krenzel	Jr
G	70	Scott Kuhnhein	Sr
FL	86	Maurice Lee	Jr
WR	37	Jamal Luke	Jr
OL	55	Nick Mangold	Fr
OT	62	John McLaughlin	So
QB	15	Scott McMullen	Jr
RB	41	Aaron Mochon	Fr
OT	74	Derek Morris	Fr
OL	74	Ben Nash	Fr
G	64	Adam Olds	Fr
OT	71	Shane Olivea	Jr
QB	18	Jim Otis	So
RB	20	Roshawn Parker	Jr
RB	42	Steve Pavelka	So
WR	23	Scott Petroff	Jr
TB	34	JaJa Riley	Fr
TB	30	Lydell Ross	So
FB	43	Brandon Schnittker	Fr
OL	77	Rob Sims	Fr
QB	10	Troy Smith	Fr
OT	50	Michael Stafford	Sr
FB	33	Nate Stead	Jr
C	76	Alex Stepanovich	Jr
QB	24	Matt Trombitas	Fr
FB	48	Jack Tucker	Sr
C	69	Andree Tyree	Fr
FL	4	Chris Vance	Sr
OL	73	Steve Winner	Fr
WR	11	Mike Young	So
QB	9	Justin Zwick	Fr

Defense

Pos.	#	Name	Class
S	26	Will Allen	Jr
DT	54	Tim Anderson	Jr
LB	91	Jason Bond	Jr
S	19	LeAndre Boone	Fr
LB	58	Joe Bradley	Fr
CB	1	Bobby Britton	Jr
LB	42	Bobby Carpenter	Fr
CB	20	Chris Conwell	Sr
DE	74	Bryce Culver	So
LB	5	Mike D'Andrea	Fr
S	2	Mike Doss (C)	Sr
DB	37	Tyler Everett	Fr
CB	37	Dustin Fox	So
DE	75	Simon Fraser	So
DE	65	Steve Graef	So
LB	6	Cie Grant	Sr
DT	94	Marcus Green	Fr
DB	4	Rob Harley	So
LB	47	A. J. Hawk	Fr
CB	13	Harlen Jacobs	So
DE	52	Mike Kudla	Fr
S	41	Thomas Matthews	So
CB	11	Richard McNutt	Jr
DB	32	Brandon Mitchell	Fr
S	25	Donnie Nickey (C)	Sr
LB	36	Pat O'Neill	Jr
LB	46	Fred Pagac Jr.	Jr
DE	98	Joel Penton	Fr
DT	97	Kenny Peterson	Sr
DL	90	Quinn Pitcock	Fr
LB	44	Robert Reynolds	Jr
DE	92	Jay Richardson	Fr
CB	24	Mike Roberts	Fr
DB	21	Nate Salley	Fr
DE	99	Gregory Schaefer	Fr
DE	56	Darrion Scott	Jr
DE	93	Will Smith	Jr
DT	95	David Thompson	Sr
DB	49	E.J. Underwood	Fr
LB	89	Stan White Jr.	Fr
LB	35	Matt Wilhelm	Sr
DL	52	Sam Williams	So

Special teams

Pos.	#	Name	Class
LS	60	Kyle Andrews	So
P	18	Andy Groom	Sr
P, PK	23	Josh Huston	So
LS	62	Jeremy Miller	Jr
PK	85	Mike Nugent	So
PK	19	Matt Rusell	Sr
P	21	B.J. Sander	Jr
P, PK	86	Kyle Turano	Jr
P, DB	9	Bryan Weaver	So
LS	67	Kurt Wilhelm	So

Head coach

- Jim Tressel

Coordinators/assistant coaches

- Jim Bollman
- Bill Conley
- Mark Dantonio
- Joe Daniels
- Luke Fickell
- Jim Heacock
- Chris Oliver
- Mark Snyder
- Tim Spencer
- Dick Tressel
- Mike Tressel
- Bob Tucker
- Mel Tucker

Legend

- (C) Team captain
- (S) Suspended
- (I) Ineligible
- Injured
- Redshirt

Roster
Last update: 2015-12-20

=== Depth chart ===
Defense

FS
Donnie Nickey
Will Allen

WLB	Middle LB	SLB
Cie Grant	Matt Wilhelm	Robert Reynolds
A. J. Hawk	Mike D'Andrea	Bobby Carpenter

SS
Mike Doss
Tyler Everett

CB
Chris Gamble
E. J. Underwood

DE	DT	DT	DE
Will Smith	Kenny Peterson	Tim Anderson	Darrion Scott
Simon Fraser	Marcus Green	David Thompson	Mike Kudla

CB
Dustin Fox
Nate Salley

Offense

WR
Michael Jenkins
Drew Carter

LT	LG	C	RG	RT
Ivan Douglas	Adrien Clarke	Alex Stepanovich	Bryce Bishop	Shane Olivea
Rob Sims	Mike Stafford	Nick Mangold	Scott Kuhnhein	Mike Kne

TE
Ben Hartsock
Ryan Hamby

WR
Chris Gamble
Chris Vance

QB
Craig Krenzel
Scott McMullen

Key reserves
RB Maurice Hall

FB
Brandon Joe
Brandon Schnittker

Special teams
PK Mike Nugent
PK Jeremy Uhlenhake
P Andy Groom
P B. J. Sander
KR Maurice Hall
PR Chris Gamble

RB
Maurice Clarett
Lydell Ross

Source: Athletic Department official site, 2002 football archive 12-10-02 depth chart

== Awards and honors ==
- Maurice Clarett: Big Ten Freshman of the Year

== Draft picks ==
Rnd.	Pick	Team	Player	Pos.	College	Notes
2	58		Mike Doss	S	Ohio State	
3	79		Kenny Peterson	DT	Ohio State	
3	86		Cie Grant	LB	Ohio State	
4	112		Matt Wilhelm	LB	Ohio State	
5	154		Donnie Nickey	S	Ohio State	
