= Holy Buckeye =

Famous play in the history of Ohio State football

2002 Ohio State at Purdue
Ohio State Buckeyes	Purdue Boilermakers
(10–0)	(4–5)
10	6
Head coach: Jim Tressel	Head coach: Joe Tiller
AP / Coaches / BCS; 3 / 3 / 2
	1	2	3	4	Total
Ohio State	0	3	0	7	10
Purdue	3	0	0	3	6
- Date: November 9, 2002
- Season: 2002
- Stadium: Ross–Ade Stadium
- Location: West Lafayette, Indiana
- Referee: Dennis Lipski
- Attendance: 65,250

United States TV coverage
- Network: ABC
- Announcers: Brent Musburger (play-by-play); Gary Danielson (color); Jack Arute (sideline)

Holy Buckeye is the nickname given to one of the most famous plays in the history of Ohio State football. It occurred in a late-regular season game between the Ohio State Buckeyes and the Purdue Boilermakers at Ross–Ade Stadium in West Lafayette, Indiana, on November 9, 2002.

The play was a critical point for the 2002 Ohio State Buckeyes football team, as an incomplete pass (or a failed first-down conversion) would have likely resulted in a loss to Purdue, which in turn, would have almost certainly removed Ohio State from national championship contention. The nickname "Holy Buckeye" is a play on other similar expressions (e.g., "holy cow", "holy mackerel", etc.) and came from Brent Musburger, the ABC television play-by-play announcer, who exclaimed the phrase as the completion was made. Musburger had uttered the phrase "Holy Toledo" 2 years earlier on October 28, 2000, in a game between Purdue and Ohio State when Drew Brees threw a long game-winning pass to Seth Morales to beat Ohio State leading to a Big Ten championship.

== Events of the play ==
Diagram of the King Right 64 Y Shallow Swap (the "Holy Buckeye")

Ohio State, which had been struggling on offense for the entire game, found itself with a 3rd and 14 at the 50-yard line, trailing Purdue by a score of 6–3 with 2:26 remaining in the game. After completing a 13-yard pass to Ben Hartsock on the left sideline, Ohio State had a 4th and 1 to go. Rather than have the kicker Mike Nugent attempt a long field goal to tie, or call a running play for tailback Lydell Ross to gain the necessary yardage to avoid a turnover on downs (star running back Maurice Clarett was injured and could not play), Jim Tressel called the "King Right 64 Y Shallow Swap" - a pass. With the game clock still running from the previous play, the ball was snapped with just 1:44 left, and after dropping back, quarterback Craig Krenzel stepped up into the pocket and threw a 37-yard pass down the left sideline, which was caught by Michael Jenkins in the endzone to score the winning touchdown.

== Quotes ==
They're going to show the I-Back behind the Fullback on Fourth down. It could be up to the Offensive Line...no, Krenzel's going to throw for it! Gotta get it off! They go for the ballgame...touchdown! Touchdown! Michael Jenkins! On Fourth and One! Would you believe it?! Craig Krenzel strikes with a minute and a half left! Holy Buckeye!

— Brent Musburger, calling the play on ABC television

What was I thinking on that play? Well, one thing I had always believed was that, when the going gets the toughest, that you always call something that we know how to do. If it was a run, it was probably going to be an off-tackle, and if it was a pass, it was probably going to be a Y-shallow. And that, our guys had practiced that play a million times, and...did I dream that it would get to like the fifth - you know - thing that he had to look at? No. I thought that maybe Ben [Hartsock] would be open; I was wrong. I thought the backs might get open for a checkdown; I was wrong. Chris Gamble ran the wrong route...he was even...Craig [Krenzel] was looking over for him - Chris was like over on the Purdue bench. And so, Craig had one choice. I'm sure he was telling you what I was thinking, you know I'm sure he was thinking four-letter words about 'I can't believe they called this play that was going to be so covered'. But he had one last thing he had to look at, and as you guys all know, that the number one attribute of a good quarterback is that they make great decisions. And no one made decisions better in my 38 years of coaching quarterbacks than Craig Krenzel, and he made the right decision and threw it up there. What I was thinking was, 'I hope he didn't overthrow it'.

— Jim Tressel, ten years later, when asked about the play

Now, I have to admit that when [Krenzel] heaved that pass, my first reaction was, 'What? We just need two yards. Oh no, no..." The percentage chance of hitting the deep ball is not great. We didn't need a touchdown at that point; we just needed a first down. But when the ball was caught in the end zone for a touchdown, my "Oh no," turned into, "Yes!".

— Jim Tressel, The Winners Manual: For the Game of Life.

== Game summary ==
=== Scoring summary ===
Scoring summary

Quarter	Time	Drive			Team	Scoring information	Score	
Quarter	Time	Plays	Yards	TOP	Team	Scoring information	OSU	PUR
1	0:42	6	19	1:57	PUR	21-yard field goal by Berin Lacevic	0	3
2	0:00	9	36	3:15	OSU	22-yard field goal by Mike Nugent	3	3
4	7:50	8	65	4:18	PUR	32-yard field goal by Berin Lacevic	3	6
4	1:36	4	46	1:34	OSU	Michael Jenkins 37-yard touchdown reception from Craig Krenzel, Mike Nugent kick good	10	6
"TOP" = time of possession. For other American football terms, see Glossary of American football.							10	6

=== Game statistics ===
	1	2	3	4	Total
No. 3 Buckeyes	0	3	0	7	10
Boilermakers	3	0	0	3	6

Statistics	OSU	PUR
First downs	13	17
Plays–yards	59–267	68–341
Rushes–yards	39–94	29–56
Passing yards	173	285
Passing: comp–att–int	13–20–1	27–39–3
Turnovers		
Time of possession	28:20	31:40

Team	Category	Player	Statistics
Ohio State	Passing	Craig Krenzel	13/20, 173 yds, 1 TD, 1 INT
Ohio State	Rushing	Maurice Clarett	14 car, 52 yds
Ohio State	Receiving	Michael Jenkins	5 rec, 87 yds, 1 TD
Purdue	Passing	Kyle Orton	18/28, 169 yds, 3 INT
Purdue	Rushing	Brandon Jones	12 car, 28 yds
Purdue	Receiving	Taylor Stubblefield	7 rec, 63 yds

== Aftermath ==
The Buckeyes moved to 11–0 with the victory and kept their national championship hopes alive. After two straight close wins against Illinois and Michigan, Ohio State won the Fiesta Bowl against the Miami Hurricanes to win the national championship and complete a 14–0 season. Purdue fell to 4–6 with the loss, but rebounded to win their final games of the regular season and received an invitation to the Sun Bowl, which they won 34–24 over Washington to finish the season 7–6.
