= Larry Stevens =

American football player (born 1982)

No. 95
- Position: Linebacker

Personal information
- Born: January 22, 1982 (age 44); Tacoma, Washington, U.S.
- Listed height: 6 ft 3 in (1.91 m)
- Listed weight: 250 lb (113 kg)

Career information
- College: Michigan

Career history
- Cincinnati Bengals (2004–2005); Houston Texans (2006)*
- * Offseason or practice squad member only

Awards and highlights
- Second-team All-Big Ten (2003)
- Stats at Pro Football Reference

Larry Ernest Stevens Jr. (born January 22, 1982) is an American former professional football player who was a linebacker for the Cincinnati Bengals of the National Football League (NFL). He played college football for the Michigan Wolverines from 2000 to 2003.

== Early life ==
Stevens was born in Tacoma, Washington, and attended Woodrow Wilson High School in Tacoma. He was a star athlete in both basketball and football for Woodrow Wilson. He was considered the top football prospect in the State of Washington in the Class of 2000 and had offers from Washington, Oregon, UCLA, Nebraska, Michigan and other schools. The Seattle Post-Intelligencer described Stevens this way: "Stevens is the ultimate catch because of the things he can do with his 6-foot-4, 230-pound frame. He runs 40 yards in 4.6 seconds. He can dunk a basketball backward from a standing position. He can reach the end zone in any number of ways."

== College career ==
Stevens made his first official recruiting visit to the University of Michigan in December 1999 and gave his oral commitment to the Wolverines during the visit. Stevens said, "I've always wanted to go to Michigan, even when I was a little kid. When I got there, everyone made me feel really comfortable there." He played college football as a defensive end and linebacker for the Michigan Wolverines from 2000 to 2003. In four years, playing for Michigan, he appeared in 44 games and was credited with 77 tackles, 21 assists, 25 tackles for loss and 12 sacks. Sports Illustrated wrote that Stevens was an "athletic defensive end whose game possesses a lot of explosion."

== Professional career ==
Stevens played professional football for the Cincinnati Bengals in the 2004 and 2005 NFL seasons. He appeared in 16 games for the Bengals. In the final pre-season game of the 2005 season, Stevens returned an interception 45 yards for a touchdown against the Indianapolis Colts. At the end of November 2005, Stevens was waived by the Bengals.

== Later life ==
Stevens retired from football in 2007 after sustaining a career-ending injury. Since retiring from football, he has worked as a manager for Under Armour (October 2007 – September 2009) and in Washington, D.C., as a business consultant with Respect Is Earned, LLC (starting in October 2008), a promoter and sponsor of martial arts competitions. Stevens also offers business consulting and crisis management services to athletes in order to transition effectively to a professional life outside of the football field.
