= Howard Hodges =

American gridiron football player (born 1981)

Profile
- Position: Defensive end

Personal information
- Born: May 29, 1981 (age 45); Copperas Cove, Texas, U.S.
- Listed height: 6 ft 2 in (1.88 m)
- Listed weight: 255 lb (116 kg)

Career information
- College: Iowa
- NFL draft: 2004: undrafted

Career history
- San Diego Chargers (2004–2005)*; → Frankfurt Galaxy (2005)*; Nashville Kats (2007); Hamilton Tiger-Cats (2007); Calgary Stampeders (2008)
- * Offseason or practice squad member only

Awards and highlights
- Grey Cup champion (2008); First-team All-Big Ten (2002); Second-team All-Big Ten (2003)
- Stats at CFL.ca (archive)
- Stats at ArenaFan.com

Howard Hodges, III (born May 29, 1981) is an American former professional football defensive end. He was signed by the San Diego Chargers as an undrafted free agent in 2004. He played college football at Iowa.

Hodges also played for the Nashville Kats, Hamilton Tiger-Cats and Calgary Stampeders.
