= Michael Jenkins (wide receiver) =

American football player (born 1982)

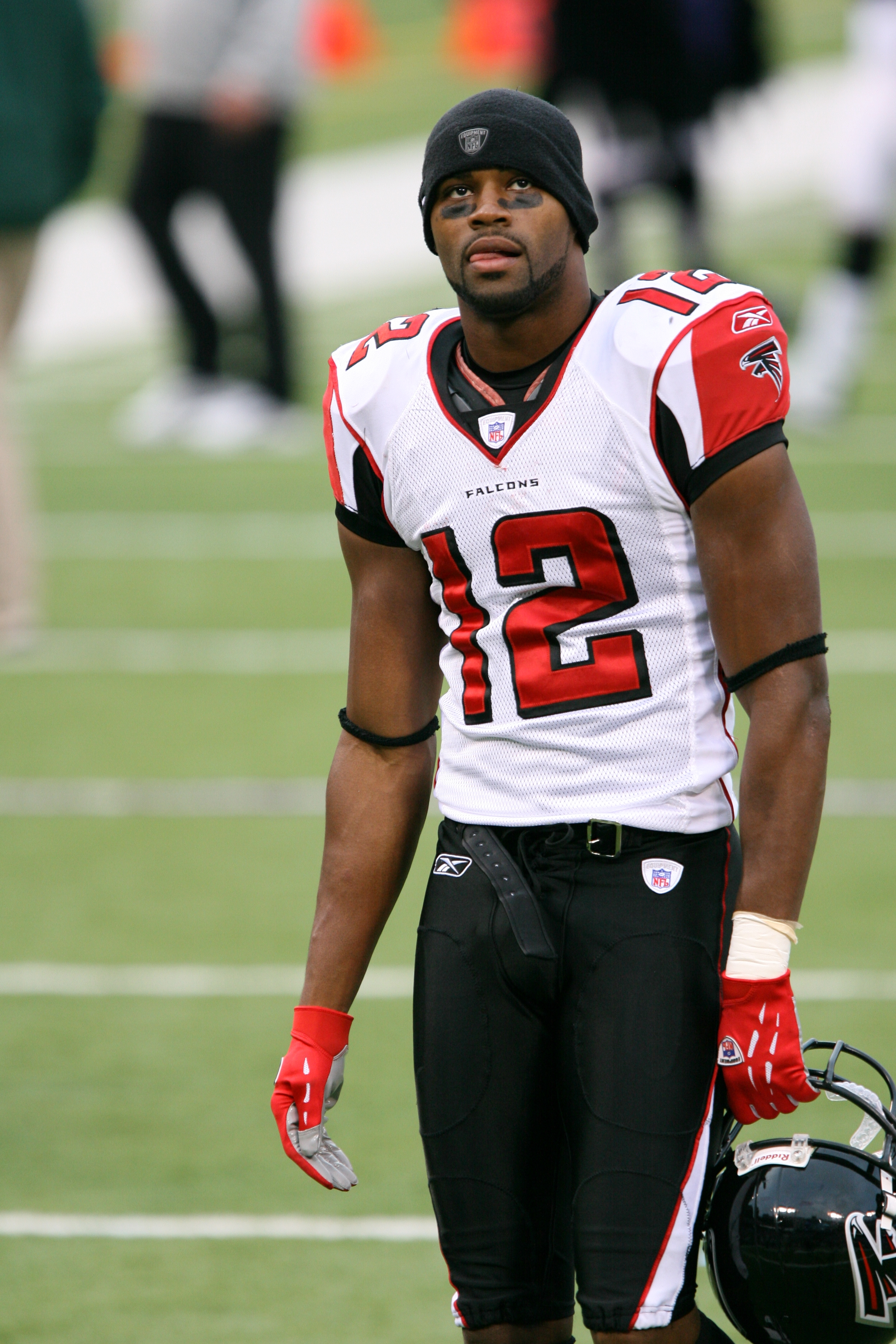
- Jenkins with the Atlanta Falcons in 2006

No. 12, 84
- Position: Wide receiver

Personal information
- Born: June 18, 1982 (age 44); Tampa, Florida, U.S.
- Listed height: 6 ft 4 in (1.93 m)
- Listed weight: 214 lb (97 kg)

Career information
- High school: A. P. Leto (Tampa)
- College: Ohio State (2000–2003)
- NFL draft: 2004: 1st round, 29th overall pick

Career history
- Atlanta Falcons (2004–2010); Minnesota Vikings (2011–2012); New England Patriots (2013)*
- * Offseason or practice squad member only

Awards and highlights
- BCS national champion (2002); Second-team All-Big Ten (2002)

Career NFL statistics
- Receptions: 354
- Receiving yards: 4,827
- Receiving touchdowns: 25
- Stats at Pro Football Reference

Michael Gerard Jenkins (born June 18, 1982) is an American former professional football player who was a wide receiver in the National Football League (NFL). He was selected in the first round of the 2004 NFL draft by the Atlanta Falcons and also played for the Minnesota Vikings. He played college football at Ohio State University.

== Early life ==
Jenkins attended A.P. Leto High School in Tampa, Florida where he was a record-breaking track star. He received many awards for his outstanding athletic performance, stellar academic achievement, and school leadership.

== College career ==
Jenkins became a three-year starter for the Ohio State Buckeyes, starting 38 of his final 39 games, he caught 165 passes for 2,898 yards with a 17.6 average, and scored 16 touchdowns in his career. He finished his career with at least one reception in 38 consecutive games and helped the Buckeyes capture the 2002 BCS National Championship at the 2003 Fiesta Bowl.

His 2,898 yards rank seventeenth on the Big Ten Conference career-record list, while also topping the previous school career-record of 2,855 by David Boston. Jenkins held the school career-record for receiving yards until 2026 when it was broken by Jeremiah Smith. Jenkins earned an All-Big Ten Conference honorable mention as a senior after leading the team with 55 receptions for 834 yards with a 15.2 average and 7 touchdowns while adding 178 yards and a touchdown on 20 punt returns. He was also an All-Big Ten Conference second-team choice as a junior after leading the team with a career-high 61 receptions for 1,076 yards (17.6 average) and 6 touchdowns.

During the 2002 Ohio State National championship season, Jenkins made one of the biggest and most memorable catches in Buckeye history, the "Holy Buckeye" play at Purdue. In the first overtime period of Ohio State's victory in the 2003 BCS Championship Game game over the Miami Hurricanes, Jenkins caught a pass on 4th and 14 from Craig Krenzel that gave the Buckeyes a first down and eventually allowed the Buckeyes to prevail 31–24 in two overtimes.

== Professional career ==
Pre-draft measurables
Height	Weight	Arm length	Hand span	40-yard dash	20-yard shuttle	Three-cone drill	Vertical jump	Broad jump
6 ft 4 1/2 in (1.94 m)	218 lb (99 kg)	32 5/8 in (0.83 m)	10 in (0.25 m)	4.38 s	4.31 s	6.95 s	34.0 in (0.86 m)	10 ft 6 in (3.20 m)

=== Atlanta Falcons ===
==== 2004 season ====
Jenkins played in all 16 games of his rookie season, recording seven receptions for 119 yards. His 17.0 average led the team and his eight special teams tackles ranked fourth. He made his first NFL reception for 46 yards against the Denver Broncos.

==== 2005 season ====
With the slump and eventual release of wide receiver Peerless Price, the Falcons turned to Jenkins to start. Although Falcons quarterback Michael Vick turned to him more often, Jenkins was not a gigantic factor in the Falcons' less-than-stellar offense for the 2005 season. He played in 14 games and started 12 of them after Price left for the Dallas Cowboys. Jenkins made his first career start against the Philadelphia Eagles, leading the team with three grabs for 80 yards. He improved from his rookie season, catching 38 passes for 506 yards. He also caught three touchdowns, the first against the ailing Buffalo Bills.

==== 2006 season ====
Jenkins started all 16 games for the first time in his career and registered 436 receiving yards on a then career-high 39 catches with a career-high seven touchdowns. He led the team with 77 receiving yards on 3 receptions (25.7 average), including a 34-yard touchdown catch in the season opener against the Carolina Panthers.

==== 2007 season ====
Jenkins had 53 receptions for 532 yards and four touchdowns in his fourth year with the team. He tallied a season-high 76 receiving yards on six receptions against the Carolina Panthers and posted six catches for 64 yards with a career-high two touchdowns against the Houston Texans. Jenkins reached a career-high nine receptions for a team-high 73 yards against the Tampa Bay Buccaneers, and tied a career-high with nine grabs for a career-high 83 yards against the New Orleans Saints.

==== 2008 season ====
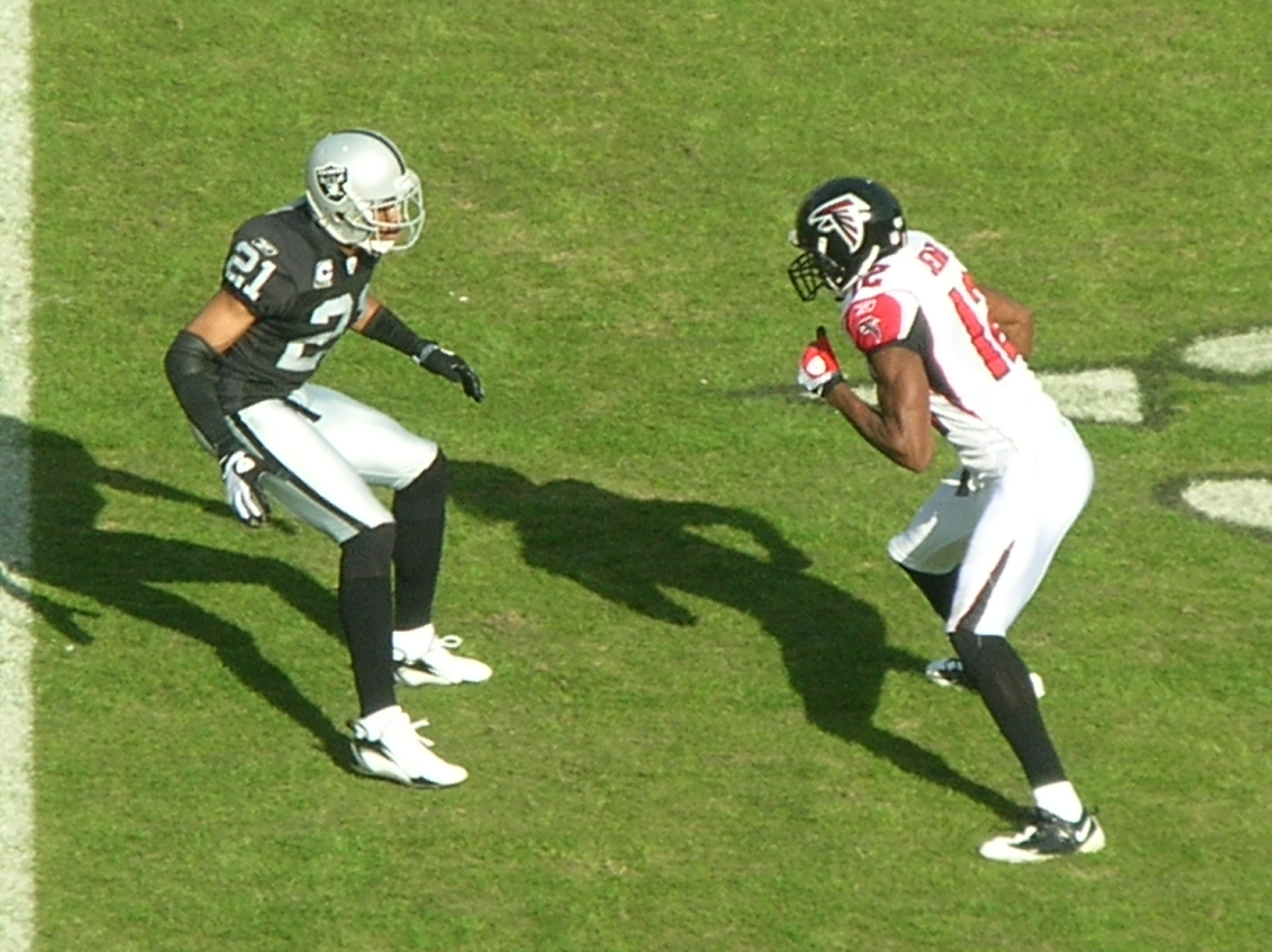
Jenkins is matched up against Oakland Raiders cornerback Nnamdi Asomugha at a Falcons away game on November 2, 2008.

Jenkins caught the first pass of rookie quarterback Matt Ryan's NFL career and took it for a 62-yard touchdown against the Detroit Lions. Jenkins caught a pass and ran out of bounds, stopping the clock with one second left and allowing Jason Elam to successfully convert a 48-yard field goal to defeat the Chicago Bears during their week 6 game.

Jenkins set a new career high in receiving yards in 2008 with 777 on 50 receptions to go with four touchdowns.

==== 2009 season ====
Jenkins started for the Falcons in 2009. He finished the season with 50 receptions, 635 yards, and a touchdown.

==== 2010 season ====
After suffering an injury in an offseason team scrimmage, Michael Jenkins would miss four to six weeks. As a result, Jenkins started just nine regular season games for the Falcons in 2010, finishing with 41 receptions for 505 yards and two touchdown receptions. Atlanta finished with the best record in the NFC at 13–3, but the Falcons were upset by the eventual Super Bowl champion Green Bay Packers in the Divisional Round of the playoffs. In the 48–21 loss to Green Bay, Jenkins recorded six receptions for 67 yards.

==== 2011 season ====
On July 29, 2011, Jenkins was released by the Atlanta Falcons. A day later, he signed with the Minnesota Vikings.

He was placed on injured reserve on November 29, 2011. He caught 38 passes for 466 yards and scored three touchdowns during the season.

=== Minnesota Vikings ===
Jenkins was signed by the Vikings for a 3-year contract. In week 7 of that year, Jenkins caught a 72-yard pass on the first play of the game, only to be tackled at the 1 yard line. Jenkins had 38 receptions for 466 yards that season. The Vikings would go on to tie the worst season in franchise history, with a 3–13 record.

==== 2012 season and playoffs ====
Jenkins returned with the Vikings in 2012. Minnesota was 9–6 in week 17 and had to beat the Green Bay Packers to advance to the playoffs. Jenkins caught a diving touchdown in the 4th quarter that gave the Vikings the lead. The Vikings would go on to win that game 37–34, only to lose to the Packers in the first round of playoffs the following week.

On March 4, 2013, Jenkins was released by the Vikings.

=== New England Patriots ===
Jenkins signed with the New England Patriots on March 28, 2013. He was released on August 15, 2013.

== NFL career statistics ==
Legend
**Bold**	Career high

=== Regular season ===
Year	Team	Games		Receiving					
Year	Team	GP	GS	Tgt	Rec	Yds	Avg	Lng	TD
2004	ATL	16	0	20	7	119	**17.0**	46	0
2005	ATL	14	12	71	36	508	14.1	58	3
2006	ATL	16	16	83	39	436	11.2	34	**7**
2007	ATL	15	6	85	**53**	532	10.0	29	4
2008	ATL	16	12	81	50	**777**	15.5	62	3
2009	ATL	15	9	**90**	50	635	12.7	50	1
2010	ATL	11	9	73	41	505	12.3	43	2
2011	MIN	11	7	55	38	466	12.3	**72**	3
2012	MIN	16	8	72	40	449	11.2	32	2
Career		130	79	630	354	4,427	12.5	72	25

=== Postseason ===
Year	Team	Games		Receiving					
Year	Team	GP	GS	Tgt	Rec	Yds	Avg	Lng	TD
2004	ATL	2	0	6	3	26	8.7	14	0
2008	ATL	1	1	**10**	5	51	10.2	21	0
2010	ATL	1	1	8	**6**	67	11.2	22	0
2012	MIN	1	1	5	3	**96**	**32.0**	**50**	**1**
Career		5	3	29	17	240	14.1	50	1

== Personal life ==
Jenkins and his wife, Toya, currently reside in Georgia. A graduate of A. P. Leto High School in Tampa, Jenkins donated football uniforms to his alma mater in 2008, telling the St. Petersburg Times, "You're always kind of fighting for your school".
