= Simon Fraser (American football) =

American football player (born 1983)

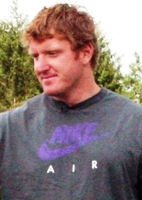
- Fraser in July 2008

No. 75
- Position: Defensive end

Personal information
- Born: March 27, 1983 (age 43); Champaign, Illinois, U.S.
- Listed height: 6 ft 6 in (1.98 m)
- Listed weight: 274 lb (124 kg)

Career information
- High school: Upper Arlington (OH)
- College: Ohio State
- NFL draft: 2005: undrafted

Career history
- Cleveland Browns (2005–2007); Atlanta Falcons (2008)

Awards and highlights
- BCS national champion (2002); Second-team All-Big Ten (2004)

Career NFL statistics
- Total tackles: 54
- Sacks: 4.5
- Forced fumbles: 1
- Fumble recoveries: 1
- Stats at Pro Football Reference

Simon Fraser (born March 27, 1983) is an American former professional football player who was a defensive end in the National Football League (NFL). He played college football for the Ohio State Buckeyes and was signed by the Cleveland Browns as an undrafted free agent in 2005.

Fraser has also played for the Atlanta Falcons.

Fraser graduated from the Ohio University Heritage College of Osteopathic Medicine in 2015. Fraser became a surgical resident in Columbus, Ohio.

== College career ==
At the Ohio State University, Fraser was a three-time OSU Scholar-Athlete selection and a two-time Academic All-Big Ten Conference honoree, as well as a co-captain as a senior.

He was a member of the 2002 Ohio State Buckeyes football team that won the 2003 BCS National Championship Game by defeating the University of Miami Hurricanes in a double overtime game at the 2003 Fiesta Bowl.

Inspired by the doctors and nurses at Wexner Medical Center and Nationwide Children's Hospital who helped save the lives of his son and daughter (premature twins), he went to medical school at Heritage College of Osteopathic Medicine to pursue a career in medicine. http://www.dispatch.com/content/stories/sports/2011/06/12/a-healers-calling.html

== Professional career ==
=== Cleveland Browns ===
Fraser played in Cleveland for three seasons (2005–2007).

=== Atlanta Falcons ===
On March 7, 2008, he signed with the Atlanta Falcons and was waived by the team on April 28, 2009.
