= Mark Snyder =

American football player and coach (born 1964)

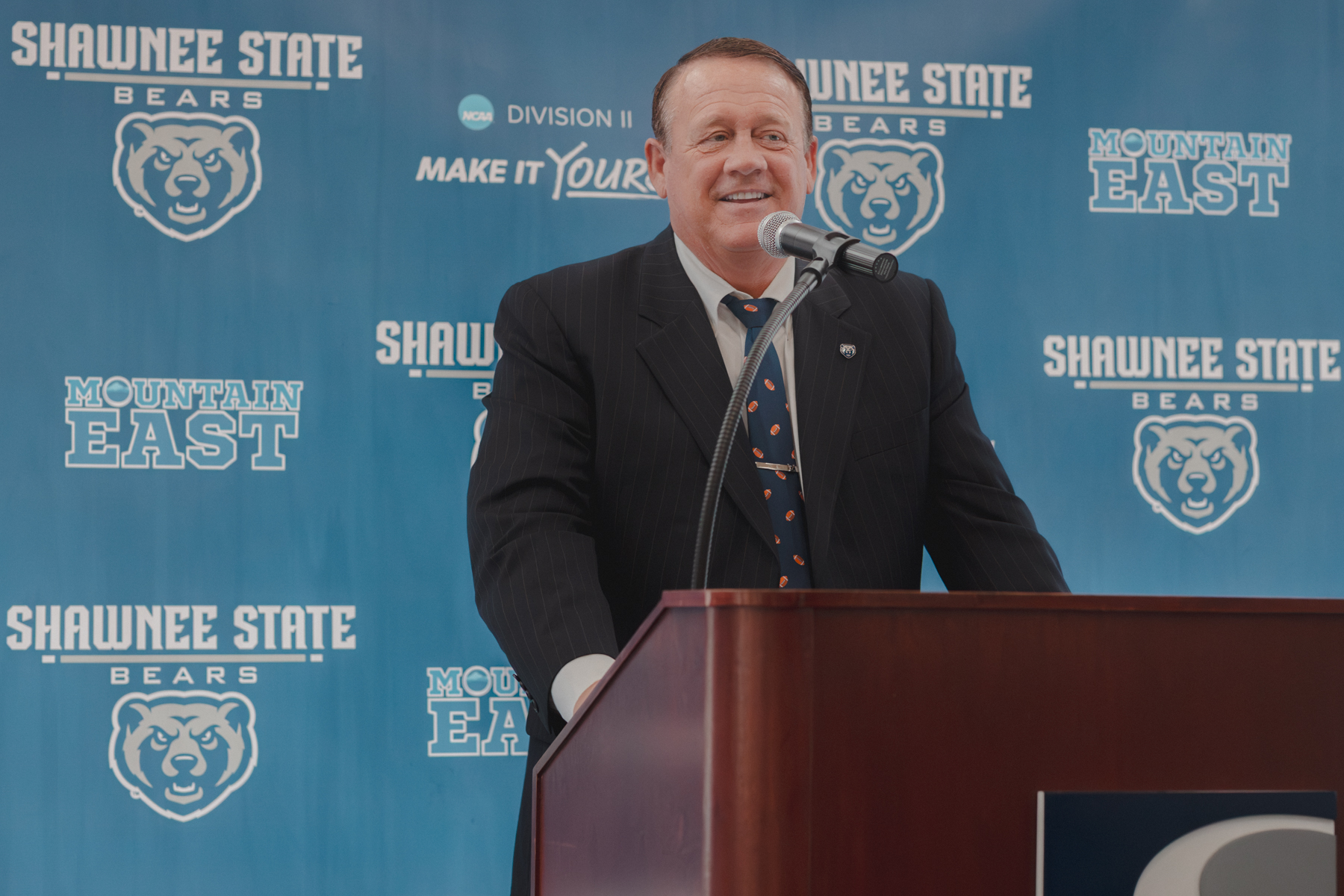
- Mark Snyder at press conference at Shawnee State University

Current position
- Title: Head coach
- Team: Shawnee State
- Conference: MEC

Biographical details
- Born: December 30, 1964 (age 61); South Point, Ohio, U.S.

Playing career
- 1985–1988: Marshall
- Position: Safety

Coaching career (HC unless noted)
- 1988: Marshall (SA)
- 1989: UCF (GA)
- 1990: UCF (LB)
- 1991–1996: Youngstown State (OLB/ST/LB/DC/DB)
- 1996–2000: Minnesota (DE)
- 2001–2004: Ohio State (LB/DC)
- 2005–2009: Marshall
- 2010–2011: South Florida (DC/LB)
- 2012–2014: Texas A&M (DC)
- 2015–2017: Michigan State (LB/ST)
- 2018: Florida State (DE)
- 2019: Florida State (LB/ST)
- 2022: Houston Gamblers (LB)
- 2023: Orlando Guardians (DL/LB)
- 2026–present: Shawnee State

Head coaching record
- Overall: 22–37

Mark Snyder (born December 30, 1964) is an American college football coach. He is the head coach for Shawnee State. He previously was the defensive line and linebackers coach for the Orlando Guardians of the XFL linebackers coach for the Houston Gamblers of the United States Football League (USFL). Snyder served as the head football coach at Marshall University from 2005 to 2009 after a four-year tenure as defensive coordinator at Ohio State University.

== Playing career ==
The South Point, Ohio, native is a 1988 graduate of Marshall. Snyder played in 1987 for the football squad, leading the Southern Conference with 10 interceptions and was second on the team with 124 tackles his senior year at Marshall and helped lead the Herd to a landmark come from behind win at Louisville and a berth in Marshall's first-ever national championship game. He captured honorable mention All-America honors and first-team All-Southern Conference honors that season as the Thundering Herd posted a 10-5 overall record and finished as national runners-up to Northeast Louisiana (43-42) in the 1987 Division I-AA National Championship game. Snyder's 10 interceptions in 1987 still stands as the Marshall and Southern Conference single-season record.

== Coaching career ==
=== Early coaching ===
After graduating from Marshall, the following fall he began his coaching career as a student assistant coach for the Herd. He moved on to the UCF Knights the following year and spent two seasons there, the first as a graduate assistant and the second coaching linebackers.

In 1991, Snyder joined Jim Tressel at Youngstown State University as the outside linebacker coach. Snyder was given special teams and inside linebacker responsibilities in 1994, and then promoted to defensive coordinator and secondary coach in 1996. During his tenure at Youngstown State, the Penguins won three NCAA Division I-AA national championships and played in four consecutive national championship games, facing Marshall in three of those contests (1991, 1992, and 1993).

Following the 1996 season, Snyder went on to spend four years as the defensive ends coach under Glen Mason at Minnesota. While coaching the Golden Gophers, Minnesota's defense twice set school records for single-season sacks and averaged 40.7 sacks during a three-year span. While at Minnesota, Snyder's best players were Lamanzer Williams, who led the nation in sacks in 1997, and Karon Riley, the Big Ten Defensive Player of the Year in 2000.

=== Ohio State ===
Snyder reunited with Tressel at Ohio State University and was coming off of his first season as the Buckeyes' defensive coordinator. In Snyder's four years at Ohio State, the Buckeyes posted a 40–11 overall record and tallied a 3–1 record in bowl games, including victories in the 2003 and 2004 Fiesta Bowls. Snyder helped develop a number of outstanding players at Ohio State, including All-Americans Matt Wilhelm, Cie Grant, and A. J. Hawk. Both Wilhelm and Grant played key roles in Ohio State's 2002 national championship before going on to become NFL draft picks. Hawk led OSU with 141 tackles en route to becoming the No. 5 overall pick by the Green Bay Packers in the 2006 NFL draft.

=== Return to Marshall ===
Marshall University's football program welcomed home one of its own when Mark Snyder was introduced as Marshall's 28th head football coach on April 14, 2005. "I am pleased that Mark decided to return to his alma mater and lead our football program into a new era," Marshall Director of Athletics Bob Marcum said at Snyder's hiring. "He brings a great deal of experience, enthusiasm, and a proven record of success at the highest levels of college football to Marshall."

Snyder was the head coach at Marshall for five seasons (2005–09) and helped lead the Thundering Herd transition from the Mid-American Conference to Conference USA. In Snyder's final year in 2009, Marshall went 6-6 during the regular-season and earned a berth in the Little Caesars Pizza Bowl. His program produced 40 all-conference selections, including 2006 Conference USA Defensive Player of the Year Albert McClellan, who had 18.5 tackles for loss and 11.5 sacks his sophomore season. Snyder produced a 22-37 overall record at Marshall (17-23 Conference USA).

Under Snyder, running back Ahmad Bradshaw was a two-time All-C-USA pick and ran for 19 touchdowns and 1,523 yards as a junior in 2006 to earn first-team all-league honors. Bradshaw was selected in the seventh round of the 2007 NFL Draft (No. 250 overall) by the New York Giants and won two Super Bowls with the Giants (XLII, XLVI); he is one of just eight running backs in NFL history to be the leading rusher in two Super Bowls.

McClellan, who had to sit out the 2007 season due to a knee injury, returned in 2008 to earn first-team All-C-USA honors for the second time in his career. He signed with the Baltimore Ravens as a rookie free agent in 2009 where he played until 2018.

=== South Florida ===
On January 18, 2010, Snyder was named the defensive coordinator at South Florida. Snyder spent two seasons (2010–11) as the defensive coordinator/linebackers coach at South Florida. Both of his defenses in Tampa ranked in the FBS Top 25 in rushing defense (22nd in 2010 at 125.6 ypg. and 15th in 2011 at 107.3 ypg.). During USF's 2010 season that ended with an 8-5 record and a win over Clemson in the Meineke Car Care Bowl, the Bulls ranked 17th in total defense (317.9 ypg.) and 22nd in scoring defense (20.0 ppg.). Snyder helped mentor first-team All-BIG EAST defensive tackle Terrell McClain, who was selected in the third round of the 2011 NFL draft (No. 65 overall) by the Carolina Panthers. The Bulls were also one of the top defensive teams during the 2011 season in tackles for loss (No. 2 in FBS with 99; 8.25 pg.) and sacks (No. 4 with 39; 3.25 pg.).

=== Texas A&M ===
On January 10, 2012, Snyder was hired by first-year head coach Kevin Sumlin as the defensive coordinator at Texas A&M. During Snyder's stint as defensive coordinator at Texas A&M, two of his defensive linemen earned All-SEC honors, including consensus first-team All-American Damontre Moore in 2012. A third-round NFL Draft pick by the New York Giants (No. 81 overall) in 2013, Moore led the Aggies his junior season with 85 tackles, including 21 for losses and 12.5 sacks, to land on the All-SEC First Team. In 2014, true freshman Myles Garrett set a Texas A&M and SEC-freshman record with 11.5 sacks and was named a consensus first-team Freshman All-American as well as second-team All-SEC. During Texas A&M's 11-2 campaign in 2012 that ended with a win in the Cotton Bowl Classic over Oklahoma, Snyder's defense ranked 26th in the NCAA FBS in scoring defense, allowing 21.8 points per game.

=== Michigan State ===
On January 9, 2015, Snyder was hired by Mark Dantonio as the linebackers coach and special teams coordinator at Michigan State In Snyder's second season as linebackers coach, Riley Bullough was named first team all big ten linebacker helping Michigan State capture the Big Ten title.

=== Florida State ===
On January 11, 2018, Snyder joined Willie Taggart as the defensive ends coach at Florida State. Snyder coached Brian Burns who was first team All ACC and eventual first round pick (#16) of the Carolina Panthers in his only season coaching the defensive ends before switching to special teams coordinator and linebackers coach for the 2019 season.

=== Houston Gamblers ===
In 2022, he was hired as linebackers coach for the Houston Gamblers of the USFL. Snyder coached the eventual Defensive Player of the Year OLB Chris Odom and league leader in tackles and first team all league ILB Donald Payne.

=== Orlando Guardians ===
Snyder was hired by the Orlando Guardians on September 13, 2022.

=== Shawnee State ===
In March 2026, it was announced Snyder was hired as the first head coach at Shawnee State. The team's first season is expected in 2028.

== Personal life ==
Snyder and his wife. Beth, who is a native of Ironton, Ohio and a graduate of the University of Kentucky, have three daughters: Chelsea, Lindsay, and Shaylee.

== Head coaching record ==
| Year | Team | Overall | Conference | Standing | Bowl/playoffs |
|---|---|---|---|---|---|
Marshall Thundering Herd (Conference USA) (2005–2009)
| 2005 | Marshall | 4–7 | 3–5 | T–5th (East) | |
| 2006 | Marshall | 5–7 | 4–4 | 3rd (East) | |
| 2007 | Marshall | 3–9 | 3–5 | 5th (East) | |
| 2008 | Marshall | 4–8 | 3–5 | 6th (East) | |
| 2009 | Marshall | 6–6 | 4–4 | 4th (East) | Little Caesars* |
| Marshall: | | 22–37 | 17–23 | *Resigned from Marshall before the Pizza Bowl | |
| Total: | | 22–37 | | | |
