= Tony Pape =

American football player (born 1981)

No. 77
- Position: Offensive tackle

Personal information
- Born: September 29, 1981 (age 45); Chicago, Illinois, U.S.
- Listed height: 6 ft 8 in (2.03 m)
- Listed weight: 317 lb (144 kg)

Career information
- High school: Darien (IL) Hinsdale South
- College: Michigan
- NFL draft: 2004: 7th round, 221st overall pick

Career history
- Miami Dolphins (2004)*; Berlin Thunder (2005); Miami Dolphins (2006)*; Amsterdam Admirals (2007); San Diego Chargers (2007–2008)*
- * Offseason or practice squad member only

Awards and highlights
- All-NFL Europe (2005); Second-team All-American (2003); 2× First-team All-Big Ten (2002, 2003)

Tony Pape (born September 29, 1981) is an American former professional football offensive tackle.

== Career ==
Pape was drafted by the Miami Dolphins in the seventh round of the 2004 NFL draft. He was also a member of the Berlin Thunder, Amsterdam Admirals and San Diego Chargers.

In 2009, Pape served as a graduate assistant coach to the Central Michigan University football team. Pape had been a part-time assistant coach at North Central College.

Since 2010, Pape has been an offensive line coach at Reavis High School in Burbank, Illinois.
