= 2003 All-Big Ten Conference football team =

American college football all-star team

The 2003 All-Big Ten Conference football team consists of American football players chosen as All-Big Ten Conference players for the 2003 Big Ten Conference football season. The conference recognizes two official All-Big Ten selectors: (1) the Big Ten conference coaches selected separate offensive and defensive units and named first- and second-team players (the "Coaches" team); and (2) a panel of sports writers and broadcasters covering the Big Ten also selected offensive and defensive units and named first- and second-team players (the "Media" team).

== Offensive selections ==
=== Quarterbacks ===
- John Navarre, Michigan (Coaches-1; Media-1)
- Jeff Smoker, Michigan State (Coaches-2; Media-2)

=== Running backs ===
- Chris Perry, Michigan (Coaches-1; Media-1)
- Marion Barber III, Minnesota (Coaches-1; Media-1)
- Fred Russell, Iowa (Coaches-2; Media-2)
- Jason Wright, Northwestern (Coaches-2; Media-2)

=== Receivers ===
- Braylon Edwards, Michigan (Coaches-1; Media-1)
- Lee Evans, Wisconsin (Coaches-1; Media-1)
- John Standeford, Purdue (Coaches-2; Media-2)
- Jason Avant, Michigan (Coaches-2)
- Taylor Stubblefield, Purdue (Media-2)

=== Centers ===
- Greg Eslinger, Minnesota (Coaches-1; Media-1)
- Nick Hardwick, Purdue (Coaches-2)
- Dave Pearson, Michigan (Media-2)

=== Guards ===
- David Baas, Michigan (Coaches-1; Media-1)
- Alex Stepanovich, Ohio State (Coaches-1; Media-1)
- Joe Quinn, Minnesota (Coaches-2; Media-2)
- Joe Tate, Michigan State (Coaches-2)
- Dan Buenning, Wisconsin (Media-2)

=== Tackles ===
- Robert Gallery, Iowa (Coaches-1; Media-1)
- Tony Pape, Michigan (Coaches-1; Media-1)
- Shane Olivea, Ohio State (Coaches-2; Media-2)
- Steve Stewart, Michigan State (Coaches-2)
- Rian Melander, Minnesota (Media-2)

=== Tight ends ===
- Ben Utecht, Minnesota (Coaches-1; Media-2)
- Ben Hartsock, Ohio State (Coaches-2; Media-1)

== Defensive selections ==
=== Defensive linemen ===
- Matt Roth, Iowa (Coaches-1; Media-1)
- Will Smith, Ohio State (Coaches-1; Media-1
- Shaun Phillips, Purdue (Coaches-1; Media-1)
- Tim Anderson, Ohio State (Coaches-1; Media-2)
- Anttaj Hawthorne, Wisconsin (Media-1)
- Howard Hodges, Iowa (Coaches-2; Media-2)
- Larry Stevens, Michigan (Coaches-2)
- Clifford Dukes, Michigan State (Coaches-2)
- Craig Terrill, Purdue (Coaches-2)
- Grant Bowman, Michigan (Media-2)
- Greg Taplin, Michigan State (Media-2)

=== Linebackers ===
- A. J. Hawk, Ohio State (Coaches-1; Media-1)
- Niko Koutouvides, Purdue (Coaches-1; Media-1)
- Alex Lewis, Wisconsin (Coaches-1; Media-2)
- Abdul Hodge, Iowa (Coaches-2; Media-1)
- Chad Greenway, Iowa (Coaches-2; Media-2)
- Pierre Woods, Michigan (Coaches-2)
- Gilbert Gardner, Purdue (Media-2)

=== Defensive backs ===
- Bob Sanders, Iowa (Coaches-1; Media-1)
- Stuart Schweigert, Purdue (Coaches-1; Media-1)
- Jim Leonhard, Wisconsin (Coaches-1; Media-1)
- Will Allen, Ohio State (Coaches-1; Media-2)
- Chris Gamble, Ohio State (Coaches-2; Media-1)
- Jovon Johnson, Iowa (Coaches-2)
- Jeremy LeSueur, Michigan (Coaches-2; Media-2)
- Ernest Shazor, Michigan (Coaches-2)
- Dustin Fox, Ohio State (Media-2)
- Alan Zemaitis, Penn State (Media-2)

== Special teams ==
=== Kickers ===
- Nate Kaeding, Iowa (Coaches-1; Media-1)
- Mike Nugent, Ohio State (Coaches-2; Media-2)

=== Punters ===
- B. J. Sander, Ohio State (Coaches-1; Media-2)
- Brandon Fields, Michigan State (Coaches-2; Media-1)

== Key ==
Bold = selected as a first-team player by both the coaches and media panel

Coaches = selected by Big Ten Conference coaches

Media = selected by a media panel

HM = Honorable mention

== See also ==
- 2003 College Football All-America Team
