= Darrion Scott =

American football player (born 1981)

No. 98, 72, 76
- Position: Defensive end

Personal information
- Born: October 25, 1981 (age 45); Charleston, West Virginia, U.S.
- Listed height: 6 ft 3 in (1.91 m)
- Listed weight: 289 lb (131 kg)

Career information
- High school: Capital (Charleston)
- College: Ohio State (2000–2003)
- NFL draft: 2004: 3rd round, 88th overall pick

Career history
- Minnesota Vikings (2004–2007); Florida Tuskers (2009–2010); Washington Redskins (2010–2011)

Awards and highlights
- BCS national champion (2002); First-team All-Big Ten (2002)

Career NFL statistics
- Total tackles: 134
- Sacks: 9.5
- Forced fumbles: 1
- Fumble recoveries: 3
- Pass deflections: 6
- Stats at Pro Football Reference

Darrion Scott (born October 25, 1981) is an American former professional football player who was a defensive end in the National Football League (NFL). He was selected by the Minnesota Vikings in the third round of the 2004 NFL draft. He played college football for the Ohio State Buckeyes.

Scott also played for the Florida Tuskers and Washington Redskins.

== College career ==
Scott attended and played college football at Ohio State University. As a junior, he was named first-team All-Big Ten by conference coaches and was a member of the Ohio State Buckeyes team that won the 2002 BCS National Championship Game.

== Professional career ==
Pre-draft measurables
Height	Weight	Arm length	Hand span	40-yard dash	10-yard split	20-yard split	20-yard shuttle	Vertical jump	Broad jump
6 ft 3 1/8 in (1.91 m)	289 lb (131 kg)	32 3/4 in (0.83 m)	9 7/8 in (0.25 m)	4.86 s	1.71 s	2.81 s	4.32 s	36.5 in (0.93 m)	9 ft 10 in (3.00 m)
All values from NFL Combine

=== Minnesota Vikings ===
Scott was selected by the Minnesota Vikings in the third round of the 2004 NFL draft with the 88th overall pick. After spending a season as a backup he became a full-time starter in 2005. He led the team in sacks 2006 with 5.5. In 2007, he played in only four games due to an injury.

=== Washington Redskins ===
On April 27, 2010, Scott signed a contract with the Washington Redskins. He saw the Redskins' organization particularly appealing because Jim Haslett, his UFL coach, is the team's new defensive coordinator. He was waived on November 8, 2011, but re-signed on November 15, 2011.

Originally scheduled to be an unrestricted free agent in the 2012 season, Scott re-signed with the Redskins on February 27, 2012. He was released by the Redskins on August 31, 2012, for final cuts before the start of the season.

== Legal troubles ==
Scott was arrested on December 26, 2007, after officers discovered a small amount of marijuana in his Chevrolet Tahoe. He was booked by Charleston police officers on misdemeanor marijuana possession charges.

Scott was arrested again on April 30, 2008, for suspicion of assault and malicious punishment of a child. Scott faced two felony charges and one misdemeanor charge. The boy's mother allegedly found Scott holding a dry cleaning bag over the child's head. Scott told police the two were playing a game with the bag, and Scott wanted to see if the boy could get the bag off his head by himself. He pleaded guilty to child endangerment and was sentenced July 24, 2008. The NFL suspended Scott three games for violating the league's conduct policy.
