= 2002 All-Big Ten Conference football team =

American college football all-star team

The 2002 All-Big Ten Conference football team consists of American football players chosen as All-Big Ten Conference players for the 2002 NCAA Division I-A football season. The conference recognizes two official All-Big Ten selectors: (1) the Big Ten conference coaches selected separate offensive and defensive units and named first- and second-team players (the "Coaches" team); and (2) a panel of sports writers and broadcasters covering the Big Ten also selected offensive and defensive units and named first- and second-team players (the "Media" team).

== Offensive selections ==
=== Quarterbacks ===
- Brad Banks, Iowa (Coaches-1; Media-1)
- Craig Krenzel, Ohio State (Coaches-2; Media-2)

=== Running backs ===
- Larry Johnson, Penn State (Coaches-1; Media-1)
- Fred Russell, Iowa (Coaches-1; Media-2)
- Maurice Clarett, Ohio State (Coaches-2; Media-1)
- Anthony Davis, Wisconsin (Coaches-2; Media-2)

=== Receivers ===
- Charles Rogers, Michigan State (Coaches-1; Media-1)
- Bryant Johnson, Penn State (Coaches-1)
- John Standeford, Purdue (Media-1)
- Michael Jenkins, Ohio State (Coaches-2; Media-2)
- Braylon Edwards, Michigan (Coaches-2)
- Brandon Lloyd, Illinois (Media-2)

=== Centers ===
- Bruce Nelson, Iowa (Coaches-1; Media-1)
- Al Johnson, Wisconsin (Coaches-2; Media-2)

=== Guards ===
- David Baas, Michigan (Coaches-1; Media-1)
- Eric Steinbach, Iowa (Coaches-1; Media-1)
- David Diehl, Illinois (Coaches-2; Media-2)
- Jeff Roehl, Northwestern (Coaches-2; Media-2)

=== Tackles ===
- Robert Gallery, Iowa (Coaches-1; Media-1)
- Tony Pashos, Illinois (Coaches-2; Media-1)
- Tony Pape, Michigan (Coaches-1)
- Shane Olivea, Ohio State (Coaches-2; Media-2)
- David Porter, Iowa (Media-2)

=== Tight ends ===
- Dallas Clark, Iowa (Coaches-1; Media-1)
- Bennie Joppru, Michigan (Coaches-2; Media-2)

== Defensive selections ==
=== Defensive linemen ===
- Colin Cole, Iowa (Coaches-1; Media-1)
- Michael Haynes, Penn State (Coaches-1; Media-1)
- Jimmy Kennedy, Penn State (Coaches-1; Media-1)
- Darrion Scott, Ohio State (Coaches-1; Media-2)
- Howard Hodges, Iowa (Coaches-2; Media-1)
- Will Smith, Ohio State (Coaches-2; Media-2)
- Tim Anderson, Ohio State (Coaches-2)
- Kenny Peterson, Ohio State (Coaches-2)
- Dan Rumishek, Michigan (Media-2)
- Derrick Strong, Illinois (Media-2)

=== Linebackers ===
- Victor Hobson, Michigan (Coaches-1; Media-1)
- Matt Wilhelm, Ohio State (Coaches-1; Media-1)
- Fred Barr, Iowa (Coaches-1; Media-2)
- Niko Koutouvides, Purdue (Coaches-2; Media-1)
- Grant Steen, Iowa (Coaches-2)
- Cie Grant, Ohio State (Coaches-2)
- Jerry Schumacher, Illinois (Media-2)
- Gino Capone, Penn State (Media-2)

=== Defensive backs ===
- Mike Doss, Ohio State (Coaches-1; Media-1)
- Marlin Jackson, Michigan (Coaches-1; Media-1)
- Bob Sanders, Iowa (Coaches-1; Media-1)
- Chris Gamble, Ohio State (Coaches-1; Media-2)
- Jim Leonhard, Wisconsin (Coaches-2; Media-1)
- Eugene Wilson, Illinois (Coaches-2; Media-2)
- Shawn Mayer, Penn State (Coaches-2; Media-2)
- Derek Pagel, Iowa (Coaches-2)
- Stuart Schweigert, Purdue (Media-2)

== Special teams ==
=== Kickers ===
- Nate Kaeding, Iowa (Coaches-1; Media-2)
- Mike Nugent, Ohio State (Coaches-2; Media-1)

=== Punters ===
- Andy Groom, Ohio State (Coaches-1; Media-1)
- Adam Finley, Michigan (Coaches-2; Media-2)

== Key ==
Bold = selected as a first-team player by both the coaches and media panel

Coaches = selected by Big Ten Conference coaches

Media = selected by a media panel

HM = Honorable mention

== See also ==
- 2002 College Football All-America Team
