= Andy Groom =

American football player (born 1979)

No. 2
- Position: Punter

Personal information
- Born: September 10, 1979 (age 47); Columbus, Ohio, U.S.

Career information
- College: Ohio State

Career history
- 2005: Washington Redskins

Awards and highlights
- BCS national champion (2002); First-team All-American (2002); First-team All-Big Ten (2002); Second-team All-Big Ten (2001)
- Stats at Pro Football Reference

Andy Charles Groom (born September 10, 1979) is an American former professional football player who was a punter in the National Football League (NFL) for the Washington Redskins of the National Football League (NFL) in 2005.

Groom was born in Columbus, Ohio on September 10, 1979. His father operated the K&M Market in Obetz, Ohio. Groom graduated from Bishop Hartly High School in Columbus, Ohio.

He played college football for the Ohio State Buckeyes from 1999 to 2002. He began his college career as a walk-on and eventually earned a scholarship and won the starting punter position. He was an Academic All-Big Ten selection three times.

His last game with the NFL was in 2005. He lives in Columbus and is an account manager for Stryker. He is married to Janna and has three children.

== See also ==
- List of people with surname Groom
