= Dustin Fox =

American football player and radio host (born 1982)

No. 21, 35
- Position: Cornerback

Personal information
- Born: October 8, 1982 (age 44); Canton, Ohio, U.S.
- Listed height: 5 ft 11 in (1.80 m)
- Listed weight: 200 lb (91 kg)

Career information
- High school: GlenOak (Canton)
- College: Ohio State
- NFL draft: 2005: 3rd round, 80th overall pick

Career history
- Minnesota Vikings (2005); Philadelphia Eagles (2006); Buffalo Bills (2007–2008)

Awards and highlights
- BCS national champion (2002); Second-team All-Big Ten (2003)

Career NFL statistics
- Total tackles: 7
- Stats at Pro Football Reference

Dustin Erik Fox (born October 8, 1982) is an American former professional football player who was a cornerback in the National Football League (NFL). He played college football for the Ohio State Buckeyes. He was selected in the third round of the 2005 NFL draft by the Minnesota Vikings and was also a member of the Philadelphia Eagles and Buffalo Bills.

He was a radio host for Cleveland sports radio station WKRK-FM (92.3 The Fan) and a pregame/postgame analyst for the Cleveland Browns Radio Network. He currently is a college football color commentator for ESPN.

== Early life ==
Fox was born in Canton, Ohio. He attended GlenOak High School, where he played football and was a First-team Division I Associated Press All-Ohio selection on defense as a junior and senior. He had 12 interceptions and ran for over 1,250 rushing yards with 12 touchdowns. He participated in the first ever U.S. Army All-American Bowl game on December 30, 2000. Fox was also on the school's track team, where he competed as a sprinter and jumper, and was a member of the 4 x 100-meter relay squad. He placed 9th in the long jump at the 2001 Ohio State Championships, with a personal-best leap of 6.76 meters. He also ran the 100-meter dash in 10.83 seconds.

== College career ==
Fox was a four-year starter for Ohio State University, who won the BCS National Championship in 2002 by winning the Fiesta Bowl. He graduated with a degree in communications.

== Professional career ==
Pre-draft measurables
Height	Weight	40-yard dash	10-yard split	20-yard split	Vertical jump	Bench press
5 ft 10 7/8 in (1.80 m)	191 lb (87 kg)	4.51 s	1.62 s	2.63 s	43.5 in (1.10 m)	7 reps
All values from NFL Combine

=== Minnesota Vikings ===
Fox was drafted in the third round (80th overall) of the 2005 NFL draft by the Minnesota Vikings. Fox fractured the radius bone in his left arm in training camp while tackling running back Mewelde Moore, during the first session in full gear, and was released on September 2, 2006.

=== Philadelphia Eagles ===
On September 4, 2006, Fox was signed to the Philadelphia Eagles' practice squad, and was promoted to the 53-man roster on September 19. He was, however, released by the Eagles on October 4, and then re-signed to the practice squad the next day. On January 27, 2007, Fox was signed to a new contract by the Eagles. He played in one regular season game for the Eagles.

=== Buffalo Bills ===
Fox was signed to the Buffalo Bills practice squad as a wide receiver, but was shortly moved back to the secondary. He was promoted to the 53-man roster of the Bills on November 23, 2007. On August 30, 2008, the Bills released Fox during final cuts.

Ten weeks into the 2008 season, Fox was re-signed to the Bills' practice squad on November 12. He was promoted to the active roster on November 21.

A restricted free agent in the 2009 offseason, Fox was re-signed by the Bills on February 26 and waived on August 12.

Fox played in a total of 11 games for the Bills over two seasons, registering 6 tackles.

== Broadcast career ==
Beginning in 2010 (following his retirement from the NFL), Fox was signed by Cleveland ABC affiliate WEWS channel 5 to be their Ohio State Buckeyes football analyst. Fox also had been heard on WKNR AM 850's OSU pregame show during the 2010 college football season, and in 2011 moved to WKRK-FM 92.3 to co-host the afternoon drive show alongside Adam "the Bull" Gerstenhaber.

He was the radio color analyst for home broadcasts of the Cleveland Gladiators Arena Football League team when the games aired on WKRK. Beginning in 2013, after WKRK-FM became a flagship station for the Cleveland Browns, Fox became a co-host for the postgame show on the Browns radio network. He is also a contributor to the pregame show.

== Personal life ==
Fox's brother, Derek Fox, played football for Penn State, the St. Louis Rams, and the Indianapolis Colts. Dustin also has four uncles who played football for Ohio State; one of them, Tim Fox, also played in the NFL.

== Awards and honors ==
- Two-time AP All-Ohio First-team (Defense) - 1999, 2000
- Stark County High School Hall of Fame Inductee (class of 2012)
- 2002 BCS National Championship as a member of the Ohio State Buckeyes
