= Mike Nugent =

American football player (born 1982)

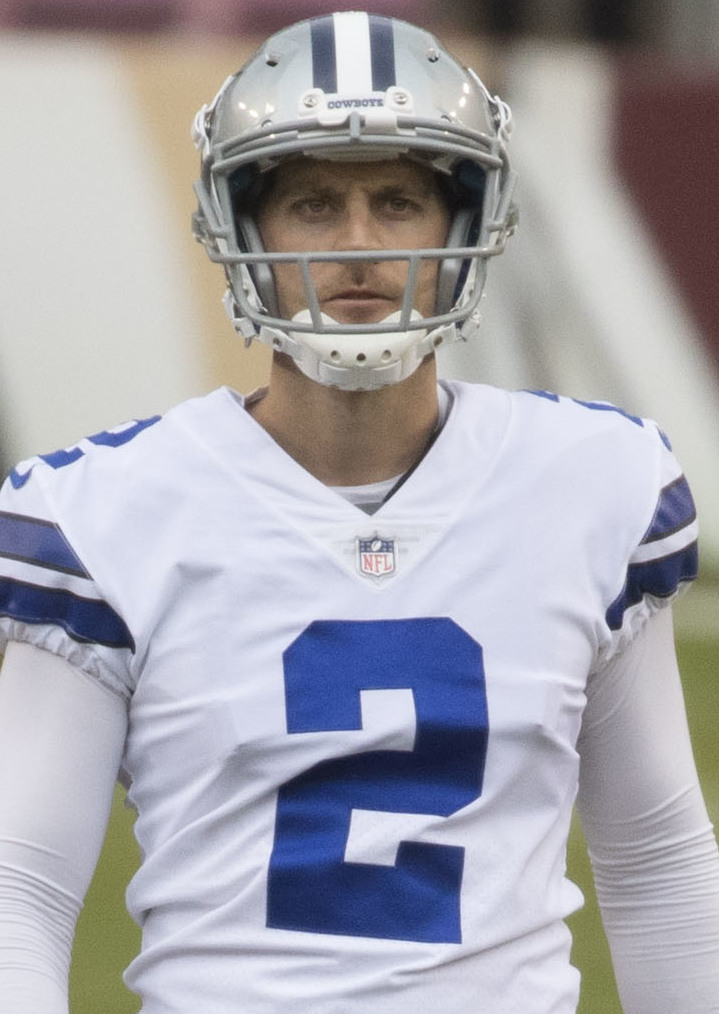
- Nugent with the Dallas Cowboys in 2017

No. 1, 12, 4, 2, 6
- Position: Placekicker

Personal information
- Born: March 2, 1982 (age 44); Centerville, Ohio, U.S.
- Listed height: 5 ft 10 in (1.78 m)
- Listed weight: 190 lb (86 kg)

Career information
- High school: Centerville
- College: Ohio State (2001–2004)
- NFL draft: 2005: 2nd round, 47th overall pick

Career history
- New York Jets (2005–2008); Tampa Bay Buccaneers (2009); Arizona Cardinals (2009); Cincinnati Bengals (2010–2016); New York Giants (2017)*; Dallas Cowboys (2017); Chicago Bears (2017); Oakland Raiders (2018); New England Patriots (2019); Arizona Cardinals (2020)
- * Offseason or practice squad member only

Awards and highlights
- PFWA All-Rookie Team (2005); BCS national champion (2002); Lou Groza Award (2004); Unanimous All-American (2004); Consensus All-American (2002); First-team All-Big Ten (2004); 2× Second-team All-Big Ten (2002, 2003)

Career NFL statistics
- Field goals made: 265
- Field goals attempted: 327
- Field goal percentage: 81%
- Longest field goal: 55
- Extra points made: 385
- Extra points attempted: 400
- Extra point percentage: 96.3%
- Points scored: 1,180
- Stats at Pro Football Reference

Michael Nugent (born March 2, 1982) is an American former professional football player who was a placekicker in the National Football League (NFL). He played college football for the Ohio State Buckeyes, where he won the Lou Groza Award in 2004, and was twice recognized as a consensus All-American. He was selected by the New York Jets in the second round of the 2005 NFL draft, and also played for the Tampa Bay Buccaneers, Arizona Cardinals, Cincinnati Bengals, Dallas Cowboys, Chicago Bears, Oakland Raiders, and New England Patriots during his 16-year career.

== Early life ==
Nugent was born in Centerville, Ohio. He attended Centerville High School, and played kicker and quarterback on the Elks football team. He was a teammate of linebacker A. J. Hawk on the school's football team.

As a senior kicker, he converted on five out of seven field goal attempts of greater than fifty yards (24 of 27 altogether), kicked a 55-yard field goal twice, and was 29 out of 29 extra point attempts.

== College career ==
While attending Ohio State University, Nugent played for coach Jim Tressel's Ohio State Buckeyes football team from 2001 to 2004. During his four-year career at Ohio State, he broke or tied 22 school records, including most points in a career by any player at Ohio State (356).

He completed 72 of 88 field goal attempts and 140 of 143 extra point attempts. He was recognized as a consensus first-team All-American as a sophomore in 2002 and again as a unanimous All-American senior in 2004, and received the Lou Groza Award as the nation's top college placekicker in 2004.

Nugent also was part of three Bowl wins – 2003 & 2004 Fiesta Bowl / 2004 Alamo Bowl, and was part of the 2002 Ohio State Buckeyes Division I National Championship team. He became the first kicker in school history to earn team most valuable player honors.

Inducted into the Ohio State University Athletic Hall of Fame; September 6, 2019

== Professional career ==
Pre-draft measurables
Height	Weight
5 ft 9 5/8 in (1.77 m)	182 lb (83 kg)
Values from NFL Combine

=== New York Jets ===
Nugent was selected by the New York Jets in the second round (47th overall) of the 2005 NFL draft. As a rookie, Nugent converted all 24 extra point attempts and 22 of 28 field goal attempts. He was named to the PFWA All-Rookie Team. He was named AFC Special Teams Player of the Month for December 2006. In the 2006 season, he converted 34 of 35 extra point attempts and 24 of 27 field goal attempts. In the 2007 season, he converted 23 of 24 extra point attempts and 29 of 36 field goal attempts. During the opening game of the 2008 NFL season, Nugent injured his quadriceps following an extra point. To replace Nugent the Jets signed Jay Feely, who performed so well in the position that he became the Jets' starter while Nugent, who eventually recovered from his injury, was forced to stay on the bench.

=== Tampa Bay Buccaneers ===
As an unrestricted free agent in the 2009 offseason, Nugent signed a one-year contract with the Tampa Bay Buccaneers on March 4 and won the job over Matt Bryant in the preseason due to Bryant's injury. After converting just two of his first six tries (2 blocked) through four games, Nugent was released by the Buccaneers on October 5.

=== Arizona Cardinals (first stint) ===
Nugent signed with the Arizona Cardinals on December 16, 2009, as a temporary replacement for the injured Neil Rackers. He was waived by the Cardinals on January 2, 2010.

=== Cincinnati Bengals ===
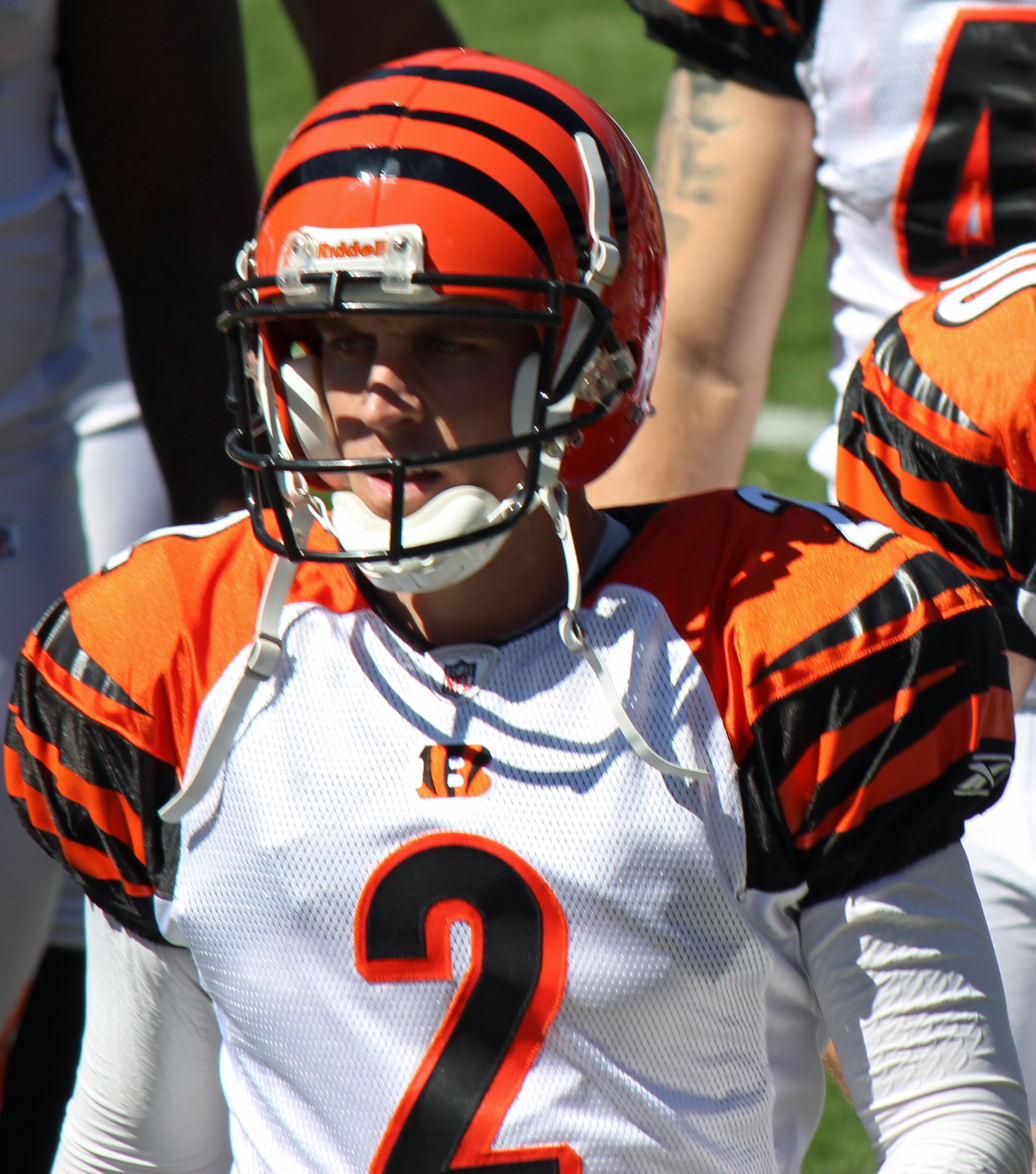
Nugent with the Bengals in 2011

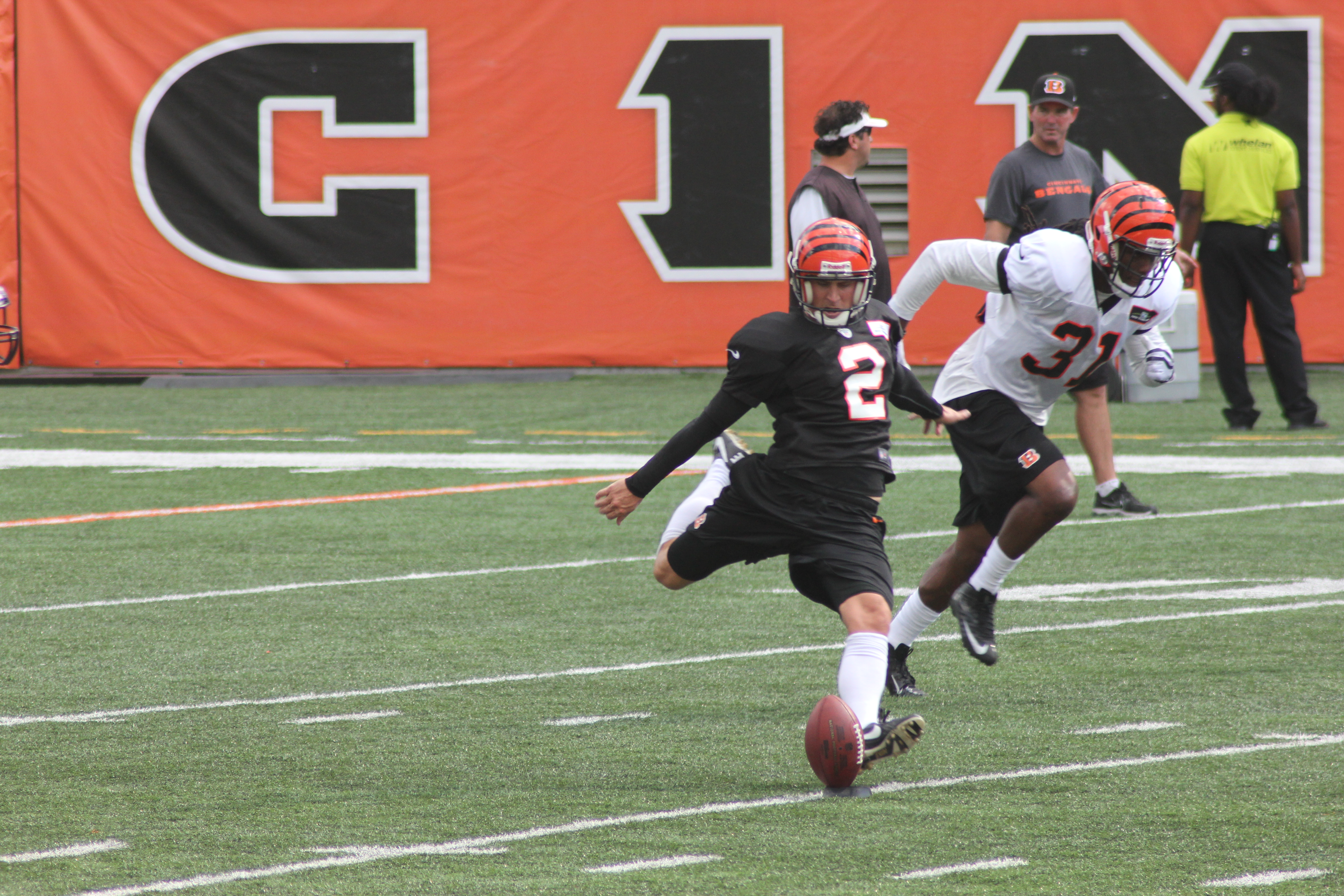
Nugent kicking off during the Bengals' training camp in 2012

Nugent signed with the Cincinnati Bengals on April 23, 2010. He competed with Dave Rayner throughout training camp and the preseason for the Bengals starting job. Nugent eventually won the competition when the Bengals released Rayner on September 4, 2010, after Nugent made 54- and 52-yard field goals in the team's final two preseason games. Nugent was named the AFC Special Teams Player of the Month for the month of September by going 8 for 8 on field goal tries in the Bengals' first three games of the season. In the 2010 season, Nugent converted all 17 extra point attempts and 15 of 19 field goal attempts.

In 2011, Nugent set franchise records for points (132) and field goals (33). In the 2011 season, he converted 33 of 34 extra point attempts and 33 of 38 field goal attempts. He signed a one-year contract tender with the Bengals for the 2012 season. On March 10, 2013, the Bengals re-signed Nugent to a two-year deal. On September 7, 2014, Nugent tied the NFL record for most field goals made in one half with five.

On January 4, 2015, Nugent kicked a career-long 58-yard field goal during the AFC first-round playoff game against the Indianapolis Colts. On October 11, 2015, Nugent made a winning field goal against the Seattle Seahawks in overtime in Week 5, 2015.

In Nugent's seven-year run in Cincinnati, he helped the Bengals win the AFC North Division Championship in 2013 and 2015. He also played in the Bengals 2011, 2012, 2013, 2014, and 2015 AFC Wild-Card Playoff games.

Nugent was released by the Bengals on December 13, 2016, after missing his sixth extra point of the season. Head coach Marvin Lewis described it as a "difficult decision" and noting that Nugent was a "tremendous teammate" and had been an integral part of the team for seven seasons.

=== New York Giants ===
On August 1, 2017, Nugent signed with the New York Giants where he would compete with Aldrick Rosas for the starting position. At the conclusion of the preseason, Nugent was cut from the Giants' roster on September 2, 2017.

=== Dallas Cowboys ===
On October 24, 2017, Nugent was signed by the Dallas Cowboys as a stand-in for injured Dan Bailey, reuniting with Rich Bisaccia who was his special teams coach with the Tampa Bay Buccaneers. He was released on November 26, after Bailey was deemed healthy from his previous groin injury. He made 7 out of 9 field goals in four games.

=== Chicago Bears ===
On December 4, 2017, the Chicago Bears signed Nugent to replace the injured Cairo Santos. In Week 17, Nugent tied his personal record when he converted a 55-yard field goal. He finished the 2017 season converting 15 of 17 extra points and 11 of 13 field goal attempts.

=== Oakland Raiders ===
On August 4, 2018, Nugent signed with the Oakland Raiders. He was placed on injured reserve on September 26, 2018, after suffering a hip injury in Week 3.

=== New England Patriots ===
On October 3, 2019, Nugent signed with the New England Patriots after they placed Stephen Gostkowski on injured reserve. He was released on October 29, 2019, after missing two kicks in a game against the Cleveland Browns. In four games with the Patriots, Nugent went 5-of-8 on field goals and 15-of-16 on extra points.

=== Arizona Cardinals (second stint) ===
On September 18, 2020, Nugent was signed to the Arizona Cardinals practice squad. He was elevated to the active roster on December 12 and 19 for the team's weeks 14 and 15 games against the New York Giants and Philadelphia Eagles, and reverted to the practice squad after each game. On December 25, 2020, Nugent was promoted to the active roster. His only missed field goal came against the Los Angeles Rams in Week 17 when the kick was blocked.

== Career statistics ==
=== NFL ===
Year	Team	GP	Overall FGs					PATs				Kickoffs					Points
Year	Team	GP	Blk	Lng	FGA	FGM	Pct	XPA	XPM	Pct	Blk	KO	Avg	TB	Ret	Avg	Points
2005	NYJ	16	1	49	28	22	78.6	24	24	100.0	0	63	59.4	1	60	20.8	90
2006	NYJ	16	0	54	27	24	88.9	35	34	97.1	0	74	60.5	2	69	21.2	106
2007	NYJ	16	0	50	36	29	80.6	24	23	95.8	1	65	61.1	9	51	24.9	110
2008	NYJ	1	0	0	1	0	0.0	2	2	100.0	0	3	52.7	0	3	16.3	2
2009	TB	4	1	37	6	2	33.3	6	6	100.0	0	12	60.4	2	9	21.3	12
2009	ARI	2	0	48	2	2	100.0	8	8	100.0	0	12	59.3	0	12	20.8	14
2010	CIN	9	1	54	19	15	78.9	17	17	100.0	0	44	63.3	7	34	26.5	62
2011	CIN	16	1	49	38	33	86.8	34	33	97.1	0	80	66.5	36	44	20.8	132
2012	CIN	12	0	55	23	19	82.6	35	35	100.0	0	65	66.6	21	43	26.0	92
2013	CIN	16	0	54	22	18	81.8	53	52	98.1	1	86	63.9	32	52	23.4	106
2014	CIN	16	1	49	33	26	78.8	39	39	100.0	0	81	65.6	37	44	25.5	117
2015	CIN	16	1	52	28	23	82.1	49	48	98.0	1	89	65.0	6	7	30.7	117
2016	CIN	13	0	47	29	23	79.3	29	23	79.3	0	63	63.0	28	34	22.9	92
2017	DAL	4	0	48	9	7	77.8	8	8	100.0	0	19	65.6	11	8	23.8	29
2017	CHI	4	0	55	4	4	100.0	9	7	77.8	1	17	59.8	7	10	15.7	19
2018	OAK	3	0	52	6	6	100.0	5	4	80.0	1	14	61.3	6	7	25.7	22
2019	NE	4	1	37	8	5	62.5	16	15	93.8	0	—	—	—	—	—	30
2020	ARI	4	1	43	8	7	87.5	7	7	100.0	0	19	63.3	3	16	19.0	28
Career		172	8	55	327	265	81.0	400	385	96.3	5	803	63.0	243	542	21.0	1,180

=== College ===
Year	Team	Class	GP	Field goals				Extra points			Pts
Year	Team	Class	GP	Lng	FGM	FGA	FG%	XPM	XPA	XP%	Pts
2001	Ohio State	FR	11	44	7	14	50.0	23	25	92.0	44
2002	Ohio State	SO	14	51	25	28	89.3	45	46	97.8	120
2003	Ohio State	JR	13	53	16	19	84.2	38	38	100.0	86
2004	Ohio State	SR	12	55	24	27	88.9	30	30	100.0	102
Totals			50	55	72	88	81.8	136	139	97.8	352
