= Chris Gamble =

American football player (born 1983)

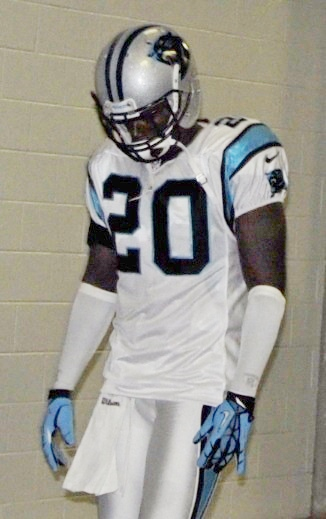
- Gamble in 2012

No. 20
- Position: Cornerback

Personal information
- Born: March 11, 1983 (age 43); Boston, Massachusetts, U.S.
- Listed height: 6 ft 1 in (1.85 m)
- Listed weight: 205 lb (93 kg)

Career information
- High school: Dillard (Fort Lauderdale, Florida)
- College: Ohio State (2001–2003)
- NFL draft: 2004: 1st round, 28th overall pick

Career history
- Carolina Panthers (2004–2012)

Awards and highlights
- PFWA All-Rookie Team (2004); BCS national champion (2002); Third-team All-American (2002); 2× First-team All-Big Ten (2002, 2003)

Career NFL statistics
- Total tackles: 508
- Forced fumbles: 4
- Fumble recoveries: 4
- Pass deflections: 96
- Interceptions: 27
- Defensive touchdowns: 3
- Stats at Pro Football Reference

Christopher Lee Gamble (born March 11, 1983) is an American former professional football player who was a cornerback for nine seasons with the Carolina Panthers of the National Football League (NFL). He played college football for the Ohio State Buckeyes.

== Early life ==
Gamble attended Nova High School in Davie, Florida. He left Nova to join Dillard High School in Fort Lauderdale, Florida in 2000.

== College career ==
Gamble played cornerback, wide receiver, and kick returner at Ohio State. He was an integral part of the OSU 2002 national championship team, which went 14–0. Gamble played all three ways at Ohio State (offense, defense and all phases of special teams), earning 1st Team All-Big Ten honors, and 3rd Team All-America honors for cornerback. Gamble had four interceptions for the 2002 season, one of which he returned for a touchdown.

In 38 career games, he started 18 times on defense and 12 times on offense (started on both offense and defense in five contests in 2002). He recorded 65 tackles (51 solo) with three stops behind the line of scrimmage, seven interceptions and 21 pass deflections. He also caught 40 passes for 609 yards (15.2 avg.), rushed six times for 68 yards (11.3 avg.) with a touchdown, returned 60 punts for 467 yards (7.8 avg.) and had 18 kickoff returns for 384 yards (21.3 avg.).

Gamble majored in sports and leisure studies while at Ohio State.

== Professional career ==
=== Pre-draft ===
On February 25, 2004, he attended the annual NFL Scouting Combine, but did not perform and combine or positional drills due to an ankle injury. On March 12, 2004, Gamble fully participated in Ohio State's Pro Day and performed all of the combined drills and positional drills. On April 5, 2004, he performed at another workout at Ohio State, establishing he had fully recovered from his ankle injury. He athleticism and speed were considered his top features with the main concern persistently listed as his lack of experience and rawness due to being a junior and playing as a wide receiver for the majority of his freshman year. Ed Bouchette of the Pittsburgh Post-Gazette ranked Gamble as the third best cornerback prospect in the draft. Former Dallas Cowboys executive Gil Brandt and ESPN analyst Mel Kiper Jr. also ranked him as the third best cornerback prospect eligible for the draft. NFL draft analysts and scouts unanimously projected Gamble to be a mid-first round pick in the 2004 NFL Draft.

Pre-draft measurables
Height	Weight	Arm length	Hand span	40-yard dash	20-yard shuttle	Three-cone drill	Vertical jump	Bench press
6 ft 1 1/4 in (1.86 m)	198 lb (90 kg)	31 1/8 in (0.79 m)	8 7/8 in (0.23 m)	4.52 s	4.25 s	6.89 s	39.5 in (1.00 m)	16 reps
All values from NFL Combine/Ohio State's Pro Day

=== 2004 ===
The Carolina Panthers selected Gamble in the first round (28th overall) in the 2004 NFL draft. The Panthers began assesing the possibility of selecting Gamble with their original first round pick (31st overall) after he remained unselected throughout the mid-first round. Upon reviewing the teams preceding them, the Panthers expected the Indianapolis Colts would draft Gamble at 29th overall following the departures of cornerbacks Walt Harris and David Macklin. The Panthers subsequently advanced their draft position ahead of the Colts by trading their 2004 first (31st overall) and fourth round picks (127th overall) to the San Francisco 49ers in return for the 28th overall pick which they promptly used to draft Gamble. He was the fourth cornerback drafted in 2004.

On July 30, 2004, the Carolina Panthers signed Gamble to a five–year, $7.50 million rookie contract that included an initial signing bonus of $2.75 million.

He entered training camp slated as a starting cornerback following the departures of former starters Terry Cousin and Reggie Howard. Head coach John Fox named Gamble the starting cornerback to begin the regular season, alongside Ricky Manning. On September 19, 2004, Gamble recorded six solo tackles, made two pass deflections, and had his first career interception on a pass attempt thrown by Trent Green during a 28—17 victory at the Kansas City Chiefs. In Week 8, he set a season-high with 11 solo tackles as the Panthers lost 17—23 at the Seattle Seahawks. In Week 11, he recorded seven combined tackles (six solo), set a season-high with three pass deflections, and intercepted a pass attempt by Shaun King as the Panthers routed the Arizona Cardinals 35—10. On December 28, 2004, Gamble made three solo tackles, three pass deflections, and set a career-high with two interceptions on passes thrown by Michael Vick during a 31—34 overtime loss at the Atlanta Falcons. He started in all 16 games as a rookie throughout the 2004 NFL season and finished with a total of 75 combined tackles (69 solo), 14 pass deflections, and six interceptions. He became the first rookie defensive player in Carolina Panthers history to start all 16 games, and earned Pro Football Weekly All-Rookie honors after establishing a Panthers rookie record with six interceptions, placing him in third in the NFL in interceptions.

=== 2005 ===
He entered training camp slated as the No. 1 starting cornerback under defensive coordinator Mike Trgovac. Head coach John Fox named Gamble the No. 1 starting cornerback to begin the regular season and paired him with free agent signing Ken Lucas with Ricky Manning assigned the role of starting nickelback . He was inactive as the Panthers lost 21—20 at the Detroit Lions in Week 6 due to an ankle injury.

On November 6, 2005, Gamble made five solo tackles, three pass deflections, set a season-high with two interceptions, and scored his first career touchdown on a pick-six during a 34—14 victory at the Tampa Bay Buccaneers. Gamble intercepted a pass Chris Simms attempted to throw to Michael Clayton and returned it 61—yards to score a touchdown in the third quarter. In Week 12, he recorded five solo tackles, made one pass deflection, and sealed a 13—9 victory at the Buffalo Bills by intercepting a pass attempt by J. P. Losman with only 47 seconds remaining in the fourth quarter. In Week 16, he set a season-high with nine combined tackles (six solo) as the Panthers lost 20—24 to the Dallas Cowboys. On January 1, 2006, Gamble made three solo tackles, a pass deflection, and set a career-high with his seventh interception of the season after picking off a pass Michael Vick threw to wide receiver Roddy White as the Panthers routed the Atlanta Falcons 44—11. He finished the season with a total of 76 combined tackles (66 solo), 12 pass deflections, seven interceptions, one forced fumble, and a fumble recovery in 15 games and 15 starts.

=== 2006 ===
In 2006, Gamble once again led the team in interceptions. He tied teammates Ken Lucas and Richard Marshall with three interceptions each.

=== 2007 ===
In 2007, he finished the year with 50 tackles and one interception. In 2008, he finished the year with three interceptions and was tied for third in the NFL in passes defended with 19.

=== 2008 ===
On November 28, 2008, the Carolina Panthers signed Gamble to a six–year, $52.75 million contract extension that included $23.25 million guaranteed and an initial signing bonus of $6.00 million.

=== 2009—2013 ===
On March 8, 2013, Gamble was released by the Panthers. He played nine seasons in Carolina and holds the franchise record for interceptions with 27. On March 11, 2013, Gamble retired.

=== Panthers franchise records ===
Chris Gamble set three Panthers franchise records, including:

- Interceptions: career (27)
- Interception return yards: season (157 in 2005) and game (101 against Tampa Bay on November 6, 2005)

== NFL career statistics ==
Year	Team	GP	COMB	TOTAL	AST	SACK	FF	FR	FR YDS	INT	IR YDS	AVG IR	LNG	TD	PD
2004	CAR	16	74	68	6	0.0	1	0	0	6	15	3	13	0	14
2005	CAR	15	75	65	10	0.0	1	1	0	7	157	22	61	1	12
2006	CAR	15	66	53	13	1.0	0	0	0	3	31	10	18	1	12
2007	CAR	15	47	42	5	0.0	1	1	0	1	2	2	2	0	6
2008	CAR	16	93	83	10	0.0	1	2	0	3	23	8	19	0	18
2009	CAR	16	58	50	8	0.0	0	0	0	4	55	14	41	0	12
2010	CAR	11	35	32	3	0.0	0	0	0	0	0	0	0	0	8
2011	CAR	15	45	37	8	0.0	0	0	0	3	43	14	24	0	12
2012	CAR	4	15	8	7	0.0	0	0	0	0	0	0	0	0	2
Career		123	508	438	70	1.0	4	4	0	27	326	12	61	2	96

== Personal life ==
Gamble has two sons.
