= Lydell Ross =

American football player (born 1983)

Lydell Ross (born October 29, 1983) is a former American football Running Back for the Buckeyes. During his Sophomore year at Ohio State University in 2002, he was a supporting member of the Ohio State Buckeyes National Championship Team.

== Career rushing statistics at Ohio State ==
Year	Games	Rushes	Yards	Average	TD
2001		119	406	3.4	6
2002		166	619	3.7	6
2003		193	826	4.5	10
2004		117	475	4.2	4
Total		595	2,326	3.9	26
