= Maurice Clarett =

American football player (born 1983)

No. 20, 13
- Position: Running back

Personal information
- Born: October 29, 1983 (age 43); Youngstown, Ohio, U.S.
- Listed height: 6 ft 0 in (1.83 m)
- Listed weight: 234 lb (106 kg)

Career information
- High school: Warren G. Harding (Warren, Ohio)
- College: Ohio State (2002–2003)
- NFL draft: 2005: 3rd round, 101st overall pick

Career history
- Denver Broncos (2005)*; Omaha Nighthawks (2010–2011)
- * Offseason or practice squad member only

Awards and highlights
- BCS national champion (2002); Big Ten Freshman of the Year (2002); First-team All-Big Ten (2002)

Maurice Edward Clarett (born October 29, 1983) is an American former football running back. He played college football for the Ohio State Buckeyes. During his freshman year he helped lead the Buckeyes to a national championship. In a widely unexpected move Clarett was selected on the first day of the 2005 NFL draft with the final pick of the third round (#101 overall) by the Denver Broncos. Clarett unsuccessfully challenged the NFL's draft eligibility rules that required a player to be three years removed from high school.

His tumultuous life outside football included his dismissal from Ohio State, several arrests, and imprisonment. In the years after his release from prison, Clarett became a public speaker, talking candidly about his previous struggles and recovery. Later, Clarett founded a behavioral health agency in Youngstown, Ohio. In recent years, Clarett was appointed to the Youngstown/Warren Regional Chamber of Commerce Board in February 2022.

== Football career ==
=== High school ===
After displaying his abilities as a freshman tailback on the Austintown-Fitch High School varsity team, Clarett transferred to Warren G. Harding High School and garnered national attention. When he graduated from Harding, national publications ranked him among the top 100 players nationally. Clarett was a 2002 U.S. Army All-American. Clarett received an offer from Ohio State University and verbally committed to Ohio State over offers from Notre Dame, Fresno State, and the University of Miami. He formally committed to the Buckeyes in February 2002. Ohio State's coach, Jim Tressel, had previously been coach of Clarett's hometown Youngstown State Penguins. Later, Clarett received the USA Today Offensive High School Player of the Year and Parade All-American distinctions.

=== College ===
Clarett started at Ohio State for the 2002-2003 season, rushing for 1,237 yards (then a school record for a freshman) and scoring 18 touchdowns, which helped the Buckeyes to a 14–0 record and the 2002 BCS National Championship. He scored the winning touchdown against Miami with a five-yard run in the second overtime in the 2003 Fiesta Bowl. Clarett also made a key defensive play in that game, stealing the ball on the Miami 28 from Hurricanes' safety Sean Taylor, who was returning an interception from the end zone of a pass thrown by Craig Krenzel. After that play, Ohio State kicked a field goal, giving them a 10-point lead at the time. Clarett was the first freshman to be the leading rusher on a national championship team since Ahman Green of the University of Nebraska–Lincoln in 1995.

==== Dismissal from Ohio State ====
Clarett's time at Ohio State University was marked by several troubling incidents. He was seen yelling at his position coach during the Northwestern–Ohio State game in the 2002 season. In December 2002, he publicly maligned OSU officials for not paying for him to fly home for the funeral of a friend and accused administrators of lying when they said he had not filed the necessary paperwork. In July 2003, Clarett became the center of an academic scandal when a teaching assistant told the New York Times that Clarett had received preferential treatment from professors, claiming he had not attended any classes during his only year at Ohio State. However, the investigation did not find sufficient evidence of academic misconduct. He was suspended for the 2003 season on September 10, 2003, over the acceptance of improper benefits and lying to investigators, something that he disputed. Clarett had also begun battling depression and alcoholism since as early as 2002.

=== National Football League ===
Pre-draft measurables
Height	Weight	Arm length	Hand span	40-yard dash	10-yard split	20-yard split	20-yard shuttle	Three-cone drill	Vertical jump	Broad jump	Bench press
5 ft 11 5/8 in (1.82 m)	234 lb (106 kg)	30 3/4 in (0.78 m)	9 1/2 in (0.24 m)	4.78 s	1.63 s	2.81 s	4.42 s	7.41 s	34.0 in (0.86 m)	9 ft 7 in (2.92 m)	22 reps
All values from NFL Combine

In his attempt to enter the 2004 NFL draft, Clarett challenged the NFL's rule that a player must wait three years after graduating from high school to declare for the draft. Federal Judge Shira Scheindlin initially ruled based on anti-trust grounds that the NFL could not bar Clarett from participating in the 2004 draft. This decision was later overturned by the United States Court of Appeals for the Second Circuit in an opinion by Judge Sonia Sotomayor, and Clarett's petition for certiorari was refused by the Supreme Court. Clarett and USC wide receiver Mike Williams, who were both hoping to enter the draft early, were then barred from the draft by the NFL. Later, because they both signed agents before being denied the opportunity to join the NFL Draft, the NCAA refused to reinstate the college eligibility of Clarett or Williams. Notably, while the NFL was successful in blocking Clarett and Williams from entering the draft before 2005, they did allow Pitt wideout Larry Fitzgerald to enter the 2004 draft despite only playing at Pitt for two years without redshirting due to him spending a year at Valley Forge Military Academy and College after high school for academic reasons and the NFL considering that to satisfy the three-year rule; the league considered Clarett and Fitzgerald's cases to be separate.

In February 2005, he participated in the NFL Combine in Indianapolis. During a press conference, he uttered the phrase: "It's a humbling thing being humble." After running a disappointing 4.72 and 4.82 seconds in the 40-yard dash, he refused to participate further, and was referred to as "Slow-Mo" by the sports media, who were largely critical of his combine performance.

Ohio State declined to allow him to take part in a private workout for pro scouts in Columbus because it wanted to avoid a "circus" situation.

==== 2005 NFL draft ====
In an unexpected move, Clarett was drafted in the 2005 NFL draft with the final pick of the third round (#101 overall) by the Denver Broncos. Many experts felt that he would fall to the sixth or seventh round, if he was drafted at all; the Pittsburgh Steelers, a team that was in possible need of a running back due to the uncertain future of Jerome Bettis, publicly said that they would not draft Clarett. (Bettis ended up returning for what would be his final NFL season.) However, Clarett turned out to be unimpressive in the Denver Broncos' preseason training camp. As Clarett had not played a game in two years or practiced in over a year, he entered training camp weighing 248 pounds, more than 20 pounds overweight. He was also slow to recover from an injury.

Despite his unimpressive training camp, Clarett signed a four-year contract on July 28, 2005, with the Broncos in which he gave up $413,000 of guaranteed money in order to secure an incentive-laden deal. Clarett signed this deal against the advice of his former agents, Steve Feldman and Josh Luchs. Clarett's motivation was to replace the proposed deal with a package that would pay him first-round money if he rushed for 1,000 yards in multiple seasons.

However, after further disappointments and incidents with his coaches and never playing a preseason game, Clarett was released on waivers on August 28, 2005, only a month after signing a contract and before playing a down in the NFL. As is standard procedure in the NFL, for a 24-hour period after his release, other teams could have claimed him and taken on his contract. After that 24-hour period, Clarett was freed from his contract and able to negotiate with any team, but no team expressed interest.

==== Post-NFL troubles ====
As his college and NFL careers tanked, The Miami Herald reported in September that Clarett was already $1 million in debt from legal fees for his fight with the NFL and other costs. They also reported that Clarett turned down the traditional signing bonus in the originally proposed contract from Denver because his attorney, David Kenner, wanted incentives that would pay Clarett if he became a star.

=== Exploring alternatives to the NFL ===
In December 2005, Clarett was in talks to play for the Steubenville Stampede, a squad in the North Division of the American Indoor Football League. According to Jim Terry, Manager of the Stampede, "I have been in contact with [Clarett's] agent and he's expressed interest with us. ... Clarett is hungry and has something to prove. He has a chip on his shoulder and wants to show he can still play." However, Clarett never signed with the Stampede. In an interview with the Columbus Dispatch published on August 10, 2006, Terry claimed that Clarett attempted to call him just minutes before the events on the morning of August 9 that led to Clarett's arrest.

Clarett also expressed interest in playing for NFL Europe. Josh Luchs, Clarett's agent, reported that Clarett was going to sign with the NFL on January 2, 2006, and was expected to be allocated to NFL Europe. There were also discussions about Clarett playing for the semi-pro Eastern Indoor Football League team Mahoning Valley Hitmen coached by Terry.

On August 23, 2010, Clarett was released from a halfway house and requested permission from Franklin County Common Pleas Court Judge David Fais to attend a tryout for the Omaha Nighthawks of the United Football League. The motion was approved on August 25. As part of his sentence, Clarett requires court permission in order to leave the state of Ohio.

=== Omaha Nighthawks ===
On August 30, 2010, the Omaha Nighthawks of the United Football League signed Clarett. On October 1, 2010, he played his first meaningful game of any sort in eight years, rushing for 12 yards on 5 attempts against the Sacramento Mountain Lions. As the Nighthawks' #2 running back, Clarett finished the season with 154 yards on the ground on 37 attempts and a touchdown. He also caught 12 passes for 98 yards, and returned one kickoff for 13 yards. The UFL suspended operations in 2012.

== Rugby career ==
=== Tiger Rugby ===
On May 17, 2013, it was announced that Clarett would make his rugby debut for the Columbus affiliate of Tiger Rugby at The Ohio Rugby Sevens Invitational on May 25, 2013, in Mechanicsburg, Ohio. It was subsequently reported that Clarett would not play with the team as their practices did not fit with his schedule.

== Arrests and convictions ==
=== Robbery conviction ===
On January 1, 2006, police announced that they were searching for Clarett in relation to two incidents of armed robbery that took place outside the Opium Lounge dance club in Columbus. Allegedly armed with a .45 caliber handgun, Clarett robbed two people and then escaped in a white SUV with two unidentified persons. Clarett reportedly made off with only a cell phone valued at $150 belonging to one of the victims.

Clarett turned himself in to police shortly after 9 p.m., EST, on January 2, just as the Buckeyes were defeating Notre Dame in the Fiesta Bowl in Tempe, Arizona, the very bowl game in which Clarett last played college football. He faced two counts of aggravated robbery. He was later released on $50,000 bond.

On February 10, 2006, Clarett was indicted by a Franklin County grand jury on two counts of aggravated robbery with gun specifications and five other counts. If convicted, he would be sentenced to up to 25 years in prison. His attorneys said that he denied every allegation, saying Clarett "intends to fight this indictment with the same vigor and resolve he displayed in taking OSU to a national championship."

On February 22, 2006, Clarett pleaded not guilty to aggravated-robbery charges. He was released on $20,000 bail until his trial began.

On July 26, 2006, Clarett fired his lawyers, William Settina and Robert Krapenc, two weeks before his trial date. The privately retained attorneys had filed a motion two days earlier saying they wanted to withdraw their counsel, claiming that Clarett was not paying their fees or cooperating in his defense.

At a status hearing held on August 9, 2006, pertaining to the January charges, Franklin County Common Pleas Judge David Fais increased Clarett's bond to $1.1 million. This was due to Clarett's arrest earlier that morning (see below). On August 10, 2006, Fais ordered an additional status hearing which was held on August 11, 2006. This hearing had not been requested by either the prosecution or Clarett's defense team but was requested by Fais himself. At the hearing, Fais delayed the trial until September 18, 2006, revoked the $1.1 million bond in the case and ordered Clarett to undergo a mental health evaluation.

=== August 2006 arrest ===
In the early morning hours of August 9, 2006, Clarett was arrested in Columbus after he made an illegal U-turn and led the police on a chase in a sports utility vehicle reportedly belonging to his uncle. After Clarett drove over a police spike strip, the chase ended in a nearby restaurant parking lot.

Police said they were forced to secure a cloth around Clarett's mouth after he allegedly spat at the officers. According to Columbus Police Sgt. Mike Woods, the officers discovered a katana, a zanbatō, a loaded AK-47 variant and two loaded handguns in his vehicle along with an open bottle of Grey Goose vodka. The police requested that the Bureau of Alcohol, Tobacco, Firearms and Explosives perform a trace on the firearms to determine if Clarett violated federal gun laws.

The officers used mace to subdue Clarett after attempts to subdue him with a Taser proved ineffective because he was wearing Kevlar body armor.

Clarett was arraigned on the latest charges on August 10, 2006, in Franklin County Municipal Court in Columbus. During the arraignment, Judge Andrea C. Peeples set his bond, on the charges of carrying a concealed weapon without a permit and failure to maintain current lane, at $5 million. In setting the bond, Peeples agreed with prosecutors that Clarett was now a flight risk or could attempt to intimidate witnesses in his upcoming robbery trial. Clarett remained lodged in the Franklin County Corrections Center, however, as the $1.1 million bond for the robbery charge was revoked by trial judge David Fais. According to a Columbus Dispatch report, Clarett, who was due to be tried for his January arrest, was in the neighborhood of one of the principal witnesses against him at the time the events of August 9 occurred.

On September 18, Clarett filed a guilty plea to the charges in a plea bargain that involved these events as well as the earlier robbery charges. He was sentenced by Judge David Fais to seven and a half years in prison, with the possibility of applying for early release after three and a half years. As part of the plea agreement, the prosecution agreed not to object to early release if and when Clarett applied for it.

On December 14, it was announced that Clarett would be changing prisons to a close-security prison in a single-person cell at Toledo Correctional Institution, where he was able to eat with and exercise with other inmates.

Clarett enrolled in a distance-learning program at Ohio University while serving his sentence at the Toledo Correctional Institution, working towards earning a bachelor's degree in Geriatrics and Gerontology.

On April 7, 2010, Judge Fais granted early release to Clarett. Clarett was ordered to enter Maryhaven, a halfway house in Columbus, for up to six months.

==== Post-football life ====
While in prison, Clarett blogged about his life there on The Mind of Maurice Clarett. Because he did not have Internet access in the prison, he sent his entries to his girlfriend, who posted them for him.

In one post, Clarett summed up his attitude towards prison by saying "Understand my struggle so you can respect my hustle. I am never coming back here, believe that. Never, I am cool on this. It is first-class living from the day I get out. I WILL NEVER SETTLE FOR LESS, EVER AGAIN. That goes for communication, personal relationships, housing, education, friendships, and travel arrangements. Everything. I have the fire in my eyes"

During his three and a half years in prison, Clarett shifted his attention to reading psychology books and business-related literature. He has become a motivational speaker.

In November 2012, Clarett was invited back to Ohio State to celebrate the 10-year anniversary of the undefeated championship season of 2002.

Having suffered from depression, Clarett joined other mental health advocates in August 2013 in promoting expansion of Medicaid in Ohio. He has spoken at prisons, juvenile detention facilities and worked with youth football camps to share his story so others do not repeat it. Clarett has also reconnected with Ohio State by taking courses and working out with current football players.

In December 2013, he was featured in "Youngstown Boys", an ESPN 30 for 30 documentary which included extensive interviews with family, friends and associates.

In February 2014, he was invited back to Ohio State University as part of a ceremony recognizing the National Championship team he played on. While there, he also spoke to an audience of about 500 at the Archie Griffin Grand Ballroom in the Ohio Union, discussing past troubles and his ongoing rehabilitation and the restoration of his reputation.

In 2019, he began working as a consultant for the University of Connecticut's Men's Basketball Program. Clarett spent up to three days each month with the team mentoring players. Clarett worked with the UConn during the team's back-to-back National Championship runs.

For the 2024-2025 college football season, Clarett returned to Ohio State this time as a part-time mentor for their football program. He worked with the team during their National Championship season.

== Business career ==
In 2016, Clarett founded The Red Zone, a behavioral health agency in Youngstown, Ohio. The agency provides mental health services, addiction and recovery services, school-based social work, and many other services. In 2018, Youngstown City Schools released a report showing that 283 students who received services from The Red Zone saw their GPA increase by an average of 16.5%.

In 2021, Clarett worked as a consultant to collegiate athletic departments like the University of Connecticut helping mentor players and encourage them to focus on their mental wellbeing.

In 2022, Clarett was appointed as a member of the Youngstown/Warren Regional Chamber of Commerce.

== Political involvement and advocacy ==
In recent years, Clarett has spoken in public forums several times about his experiences in the criminal justice system and the need for criminal justice reform. He also wrote an op-ed in The Columbus Dispatch on the same topic.

During the 2018 Ohio Gubernatorial election, Clarett headlined a political fundraiser for Democratic candidate and fellow Youngstown native Joe Schiavoni during Schiavoni's failed bid for the Democratic nomination.

Also during the 2018 Ohio gubernatorial election, Clarett participated in a campaign event and panel discussion with eventual winner and 70th Governor of Ohio Mike DeWine about ways to improve education, workforce training, and recovery from addiction.

On February 9, 2022, Clarett was appointed to the board of directors of the Youngstown/Warren Regional Chamber of Commerce.
