= Cie Grant =

American football player (born 1979)

No. 58
- Position: Linebacker

Personal information
- Born: November 27, 1979 (age 46); Dover, Ohio, U.S.
- Listed height: 6 ft 0 in (1.83 m)
- Listed weight: 235 lb (107 kg)

Career information
- High school: New Philadelphia (New Philadelphia, Ohio)
- College: Ohio State
- NFL draft: 2003: 3rd round, 86th overall pick

Career history
- New Orleans Saints (2003–2006)

Awards and highlights
- BCS national champion (2002); Second-team All-Big Ten (2002)

Career NFL statistics
- Tackles: 3
- Stats at Pro Football Reference

Willie "Cie" Grant (born November 27, 1979) is an American former professional football player who was a linebacker in the National Football League (NFL) for the New Orleans Saints. He was selected in the third round of the 2003 NFL draft with the 86th overall pick. He played college football for the Ohio State Buckeyes. During the final fourth down play in the 2003 Fiesta Bowl, a blitzing Grant applied quick pressure on Miami quarterback Ken Dorsey, forcing an incompletion and clinching the BCS National Championship. He graduated from New Philadelphia High School in 1998. While at NPHS he participated in numerous sports as well as performing with Delphian Chorale, the high school's select choir.

Pre-draft measurables
| Height | Weight | Arm length | Hand span |
|---|---|---|---|
| 6 ft 0 3/8 in (1.84 m) | 228 lb (103 kg) | 31 3/8 in (0.80 m) | 9 1/2 in (0.24 m) |
All values from NFL Combine
