= ReliaQuest Bowl =

American college football game

- Stadium: Raymond James Stadium
- Location: Tampa, Florida
- Previous stadiums: Tampa Stadium (1986–1998)
- Operated: 1986–present
- Conference tie-ins: Big Ten, SEC
- Payout: US$6.67 million ($20 million aggregate for the 2022–2024 college football seasons)
- Website: reliaquestbowl.com

Sponsors
- Outback Steakhouse (1996–2022); ReliaQuest (2022–present)

Former names
- Hall of Fame Bowl (1986–1995); Outback Bowl (1996–2022)

2025 matchup
- Iowa vs. Vanderbilt (Iowa 34–27)

The ReliaQuest Bowl is an annual college football bowl game played in Tampa, Florida. The event was known as the Hall of Fame Bowl from 1986 to 1995 and the Outback Bowl from 1996 to 2022. It was held at Tampa Stadium from 1986 until 1999, when it moved to then-new Raymond James Stadium. The bowl has been played on New Year's Day for most of its history, often the first game to kick off on a day that is traditionally filled with post-season college football.

== History ==
=== Previous Tampa bowl game ===
The Cigar Bowl was played at old Phillips Field near downtown Tampa from 1947 to 1954. Because the Cigar Bowl featured teams from smaller colleges, however, the 1986 Hall of Fame Bowl was the first major college bowl game to be played in the area.

=== Hall of Fame Bowl ===
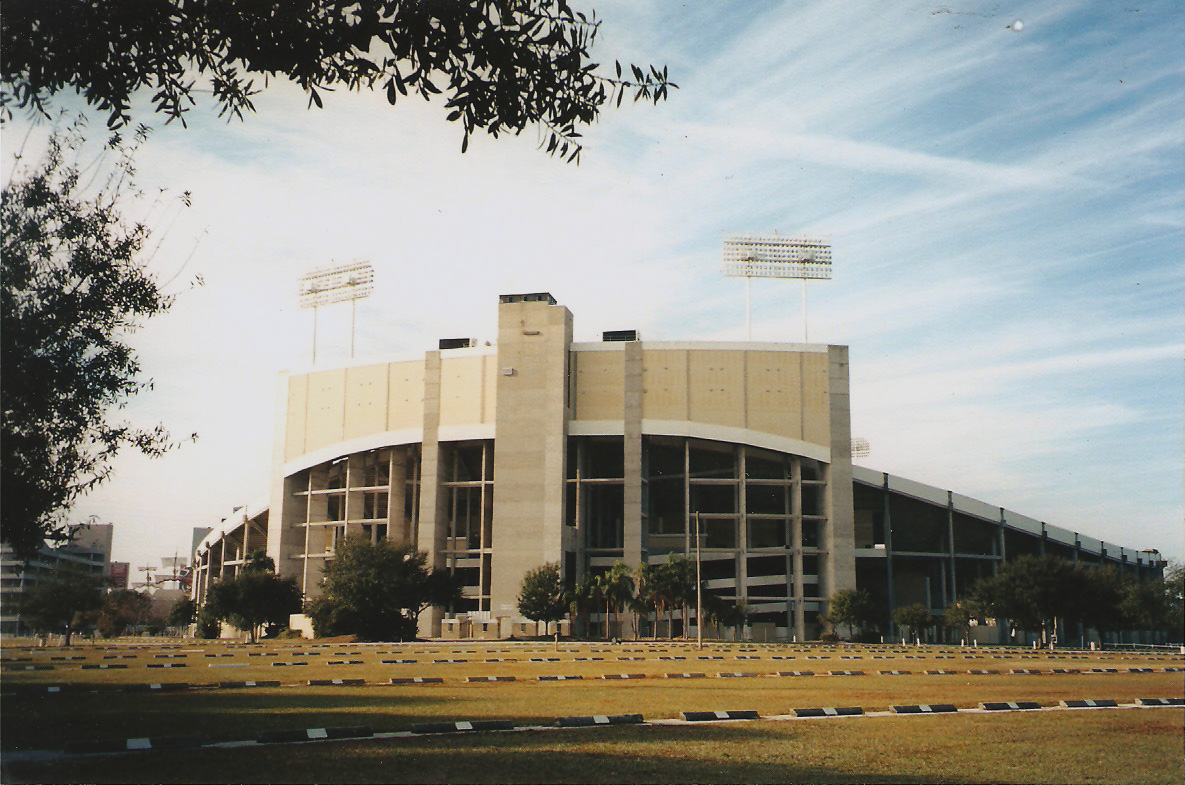
Tampa Stadium, original home of the Hall of Fame / Outback Bowl

The Hall of Fame Classic was a mid-level bowl game played at Legion Field in Birmingham, Alabama from 1977 to 1985. In the spring of 1986, the National Football Foundation and College Football Hall of Fame decided to discontinue their association with the bowl and realign with a new game to be played in Tampa Stadium which would inherit the Hall of Fame Bowl name. Tampa's Hall of Fame Bowl did not initially have any conference tie-ins, so organizers often sought to arrange a match-up between a team from a southern school (usually the Southeastern Conference or Atlantic Coast Conference) and one from another region of the country to maximize both game attendance and potential visitors to the area.

=== Outback Bowl ===
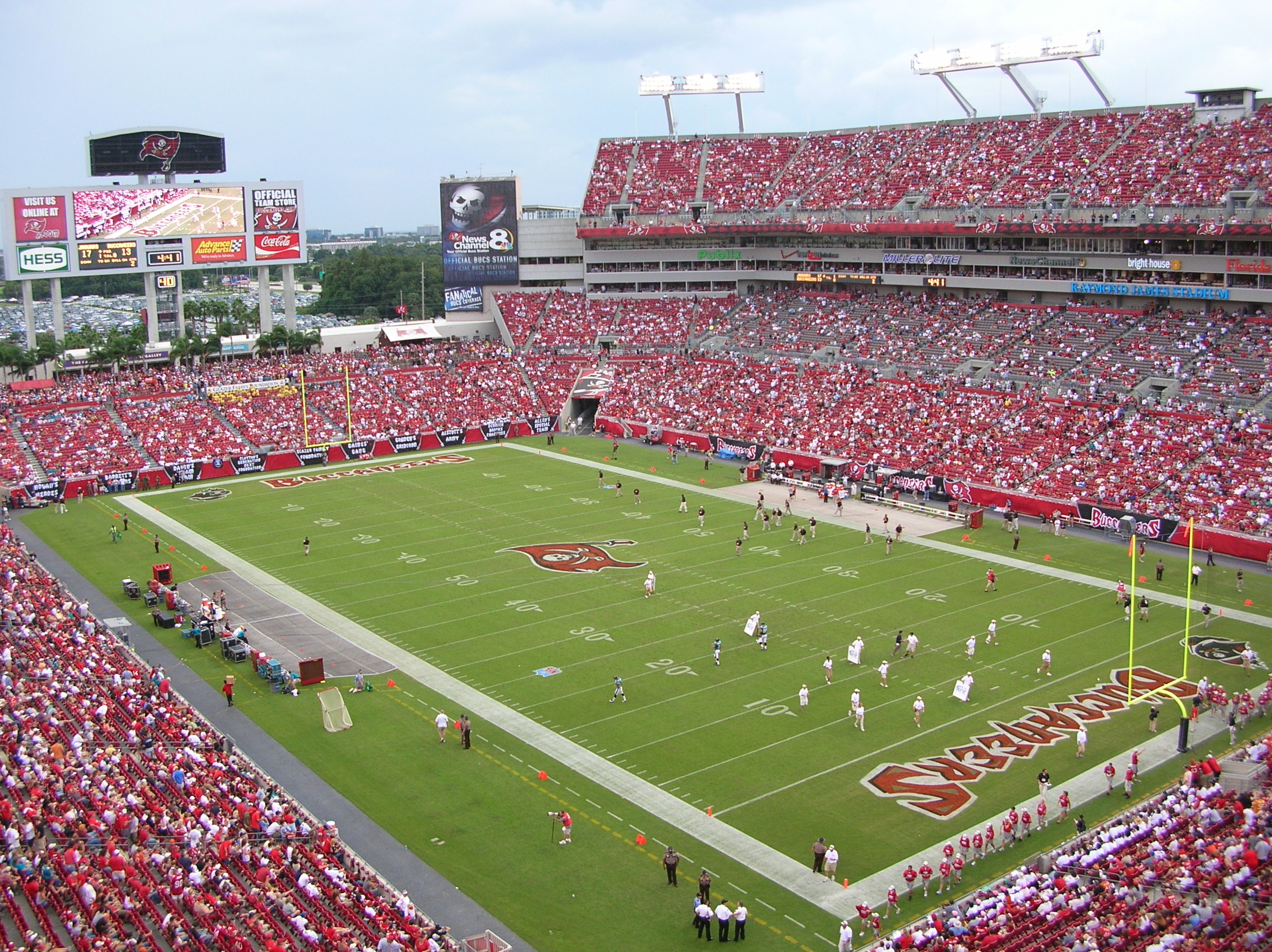
Raymond James Stadium, home of the bowl since the 1999 edition

Tampa-based restaurant chain Outback Steakhouse became the game's title sponsor in April 1995, allowing the bowl to increase its payout to participants and sign agreements with the SEC and the Big Ten conferences, creating an annual cross-regional match-up that has continued ever since. In 1999, the bowl moved from Tampa Stadium to newly constructed Raymond James Stadium next door.

=== ReliaQuest Bowl ===
Though it had signed a six-year extension in 2019, the parent company of Outback Steakhouse decided to discontinue its association with the game in March 2022 in a cost-cutting measure, ending the longest continuous title sponsorship in college bowl history and resulting in a temporary renaming of the game to Tampa Bay Bowl. In June 2022, Tampa-based cybersecurity company ReliaQuest was announced as the new title sponsor. The game following the 2024 season was scheduled for December 31, making it the first edition of the bowl since its debut to be scheduled in December, and the first edition scheduled for New Year's Eve, a change spurred by the expanded College Football Playoff. The 2025 edition was also scheduled for New Year's Eve.

== The game ==
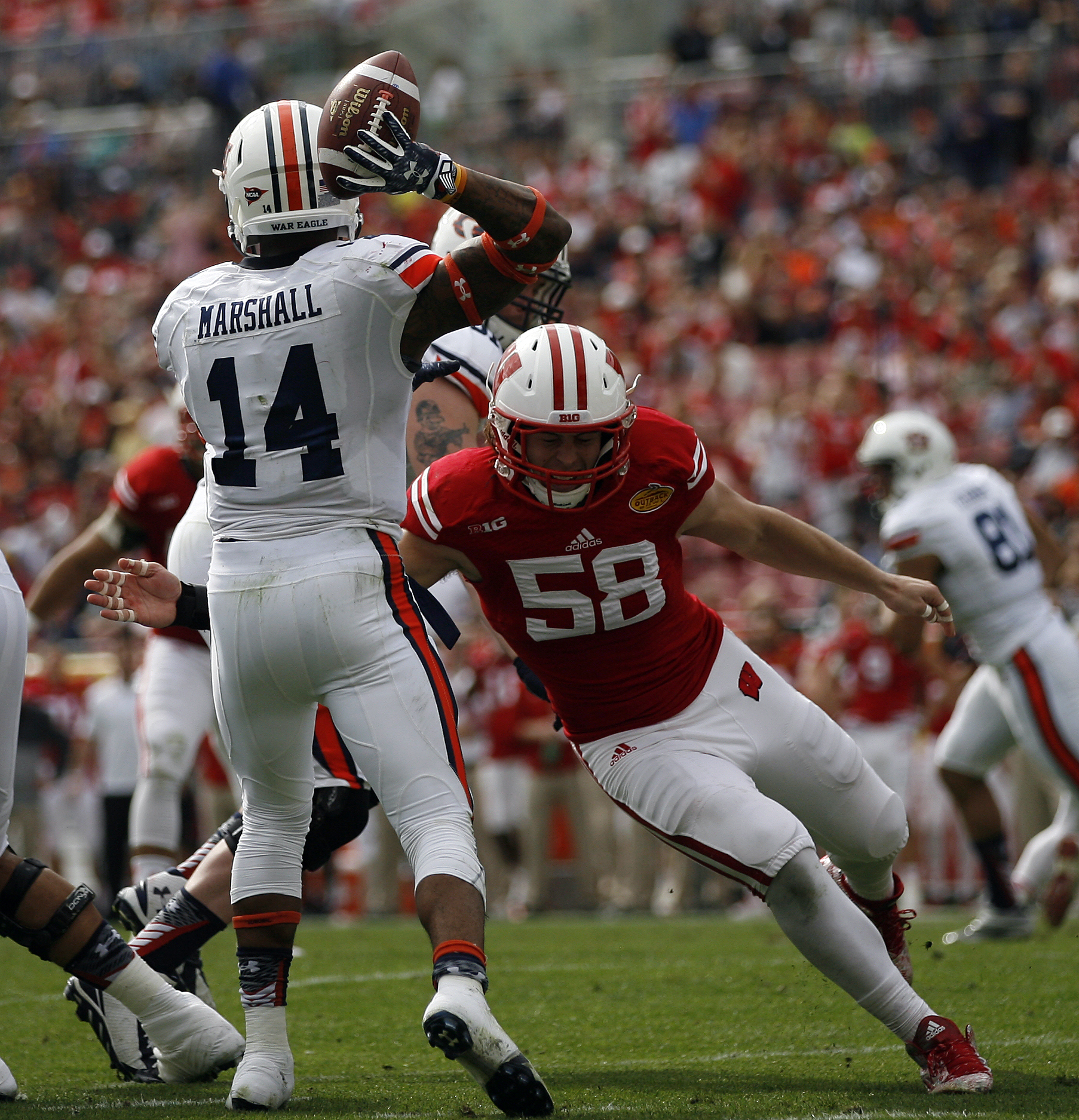
Auburn quarterback Nick Marshall during the 2015 edition

The bowl has primarily been played on New Year's Day, unless January 1 falls on a Sunday, in which case it is moved to the following Monday. Often the first game to start on a day which is traditionally full of college bowl games, it has kicked off as early as 11 a.m. ET. The inaugural edition was held on December 23, 1986, and the 2024 and 2025 editions were each scheduled for New Year's Eve.

ESPN has had television rights to the game since 1993. Under an extension of those rights signed in 2010, ESPN broadcasts the game on either ABC, ESPN, or ESPN2, in conjunction with the Citrus Bowl and the New Year's Six bowl games. Before 1993, the bowl aired on NBC.

Upon signing agreements with the SEC and Big Ten in 1995, the bowl had the third pick of teams from each conference after the Bowl Championship Series (BCS) teams were placed. Since 2014, both the SEC and Big Ten have worked with a group of several bowl games, including this one, to place their bowl-eligible teams after the College Football Playoff (CFP) and associated bowls have made their selections.

As of 2023, the bowl's payout was $6.4 million for each participating team.

== Game results ==
Rankings are based on the AP poll prior to the game being played.

Date	Bowl name	Winning team		Losing team		Attendance
December 23, 1986	Hall of Fame Bowl	Boston College	27	Georgia	24	41,000
January 2, 1988	Hall of Fame Bowl	Michigan	28	Alabama	24	61,075
January 2, 1989	Hall of Fame Bowl	#17 Syracuse	23	#16 LSU	10	51,112
January 1, 1990	Hall of Fame Bowl	#9 Auburn	31	#21 Ohio State	14	68,085
January 1, 1991	Hall of Fame Bowl	#14 Clemson	30	#16 Illinois	0	63,154
January 1, 1992	Hall of Fame Bowl	#16 Syracuse	24	#25 Ohio State	17	57,789
January 1, 1993	Hall of Fame Bowl	#17 Tennessee	38	#16 Boston College	23	52,056
January 1, 1994	Hall of Fame Bowl	#23 Michigan	42	NC State	7	52,649
January 2, 1995	Hall of Fame Bowl	Wisconsin	34	#25 Duke	20	61,384
January 1, 1996	Outback Bowl	#15 Penn State	43	#16 Auburn	14	65,313
January 1, 1997	Outback Bowl	#16 Alabama	17	#15 Michigan	14	53,161
January 1, 1998	Outback Bowl	#12 Georgia	33	Wisconsin	6	56,186
January 1, 1999	Outback Bowl	#22 Penn State	26	Kentucky	14	66,005
January 1, 2000	Outback Bowl	#21 Georgia	28	#19 Purdue	25 (OT)	54,059
January 1, 2001	Outback Bowl	South Carolina	24	#19 Ohio State	7	65,229
January 1, 2002	Outback Bowl	#14 South Carolina	31	#22 Ohio State	28	66,249
January 1, 2003	Outback Bowl	#12 Michigan	38	#22 Florida	30	65,101
January 1, 2004	Outback Bowl	#13 Iowa	37	#17 Florida	17	65,657
January 1, 2005	Outback Bowl	#8 Georgia	24	#16 Wisconsin	21	62,414
January 2, 2006	Outback Bowl	#16 Florida	31	#25 Iowa	24	65,881
January 1, 2007	Outback Bowl	Penn State	20	#17 Tennessee	10	65,601
January 1, 2008	Outback Bowl	#16 Tennessee	21	#18 Wisconsin	17	60,121
January 1, 2009	Outback Bowl	Iowa	31	South Carolina	10	55,117
January 1, 2010	Outback Bowl	Auburn	38	Northwestern	35 (OT)	49,383
January 1, 2011	Outback Bowl	Florida	37	Penn State	24	60,574
January 2, 2012	Outback Bowl	#12 Michigan State	33	#18 Georgia	30 (3OT)	49,429
January 1, 2013	Outback Bowl	#11 South Carolina	33	#19 Michigan	28	54,527
January 1, 2014	Outback Bowl	#14 LSU†	21	Iowa	14	51,296
January 1, 2015	Outback Bowl	#17 Wisconsin	34	#19 Auburn	31 (OT)	44,023
January 1, 2016	Outback Bowl	Tennessee	45	#12 Northwestern	6	53,202
January 2, 2017	Outback Bowl	#20 Florida	30	#21 Iowa	3	51,119
January 1, 2018	Outback Bowl	South Carolina	26	Michigan	19	45,687
January 1, 2019	Outback Bowl	Iowa	27	#18 Mississippi State	22	40,518
January 1, 2020	Outback Bowl	#16 Minnesota	31	#9 Auburn	24	45,652
January 2, 2021	Outback Bowl	Ole Miss	26	#7 Indiana	20	11,025
January 1, 2022	Outback Bowl	#22 Arkansas	24	Penn State	10	46,577
January 2, 2023	ReliaQuest Bowl	#24 Mississippi State	19	Illinois	10	35,797
January 1, 2024	ReliaQuest Bowl	#13 LSU	35	Wisconsin	31	31,424
December 31, 2024	ReliaQuest Bowl	Michigan	19	#11 Alabama	13	51,439
December 31, 2025	ReliaQuest Bowl	Iowa	34	#13 Vanderbilt	27	35,382

† LSU's win in the 2014 edition was vacated in 2023 by the NCAA for a booster-related violation.

== MVPs ==
The bowl has named an MVP since inception; in the inaugural game, there were co-MVPs.

Date	MVP	Team	Position
December 23, 1986	James Jackson	Georgia	QB
December 23, 1986	Garry Moss	Georgia	CB
January 2, 1988	Jamie Morris	Michigan	TB
January 2, 1989	Robert Drummond	Syracuse	RB
January 1, 1990	Reggie Slack	Auburn	QB
January 1, 1991	DeChane Cameron	Clemson	QB
January 1, 1992	Marvin Graves	Syracuse	QB
January 1, 1993	Heath Shuler	Tennessee	QB
January 1, 1994	Tyrone Wheatley	Michigan	RB
January 2, 1995	Terrell Fletcher	Wisconsin	RB
January 1, 1996	Bobby Engram	Penn State	WR
January 1, 1997	Dwayne Rudd	Alabama	LB
January 1, 1998	Mike Bobo	Georgia	QB
January 1, 1999	Courtney Brown	Penn State	DE
January 1, 2000	Drew Brees	Purdue	QB
January 1, 2001	Ryan Brewer	South Carolina	RB
January 1, 2002	Phil Petty	South Carolina	QB
January 1, 2003	Chris Perry	Michigan	TB
January 1, 2004	Fred Russell	Iowa	RB
January 1, 2005	David Pollack	Georgia	DE
January 2, 2006	Dallas Baker	Florida	WR

Date	MVP	Team	Position
January 1, 2007	Tony Hunt	Penn State	RB
January 1, 2008	Erik Ainge	Tennessee	QB
January 1, 2009	Shonn Greene	Iowa	RB
January 1, 2010	Darvin Adams	Auburn	WR
January 1, 2011	Ahmad Black	Florida	S
January 2, 2012	Brandon Boykin	Georgia	CB
January 1, 2013	Ace Sanders	South Carolina	WR/PR
January 1, 2014	Jeremy Hill	LSU	RB
January 1, 2015	Melvin Gordon	Wisconsin	RB
January 1, 2016	Jalen Hurd	Tennessee	RB
January 2, 2017	Chauncey Gardner	Florida	DB
January 1, 2018	Jake Bentley	South Carolina	QB
January 1, 2019	Nick Easley	Iowa	WR
January 1, 2020	Tyler Johnson	Minnesota	WR
January 2, 2021	Matt Corral	Ole Miss	QB
January 1, 2022	KJ Jefferson	Arkansas	QB
January 2, 2023	Justin Robinson	Mississippi State	QB
January 1, 2024	Garrett Nussmeier	LSU	QB
December 31, 2024	Jordan Marshall	Michigan	RB
December 31, 2025	Mark Gronowski	Iowa	QB

== Most appearances ==
Updated through the December 2025 edition (40 games, 80 total appearances).

Teams with multiple appearances

Rank	Team	Appearances	Record
1	Michigan	7	4–3
1	Iowa	7	4–3
3	Wisconsin	6	2–4
4	South Carolina	5	4–1
4	Penn State	5	3–2
4	Florida	5	3–2
4	Georgia	5	3–2
4	Auburn	5	2–3
9	Tennessee	4	3–1
9	Ohio State	4	0–4
11	LSU	3	1–1 ‡
11	Alabama	3	1–2
13	Syracuse	2	2–0
13	Boston College	2	1–1
13	Mississippi State	2	1–1
13	Illinois	2	0–2
13	Northwestern	2	0–2

‡ LSU's win in the 2014 edition was vacated by the NCAA in 2023.

Teams with a single appearance

Won (5): Arkansas, Clemson, Michigan State, Minnesota, Ole Miss
Lost (6): Duke, Indiana, Kentucky, NC State, Purdue, Vanderbilt

== Appearances by conference ==
Updated through the December 2025 edition (40 games, 80 total appearances).

Conference	Record				Appearances by season		
Conference	Games	W	L	Win pct.	Won	Lost	Vacated
Big Ten	37	15	22	.405	1987*, 1993*, 1994*, 1995*, 1998*, 2002*, 2003*, 2006*, 2008*, 2011*, 2014*, 2018*, 2019*, 2024, 2025	1989*, 1990*, 1991*, 1996*, 1997*, 1999*, 2000*, 2001*, 2004*, 2005*, 2007*, 2009*, 2010*, 2012*, 2013*, 2015*, 2016*, 2017*, 2020*, 2021*, 2022*, 2023*	
SEC	36	20	15	.571 ‡	1989*, 1992*, 1996*, 1997*, 1999*, 2000*, 2001*, 2004*, 2005*, 2007*, 2009*, 2010*, 2012*, 2015*, 2016*, 2017*, 2020*, 2021*, 2022*, 2023*	1986, 1987*, 1988*, 1995*, 1998*, 2002*, 2003*, 2006*, 2008*, 2011*, 2014*, 2018*, 2019*, 2024, 2025	2013*
ACC	3	1	2	.333	1990*	1993*, 1994*	
Independents	2	2	0	1.000	1986, 1988*		
Big East	2	1	1	.500	1991*	1992*	

‡ LSU's vacated win following the 2013 season (played in January 2014) is excluded from win–loss totals and winning percentage.

- Games marked with an asterisk (*) were played in January of the following calendar year.
- Results reflect conference affiliations at the time each game was played.
- Big East appearances: Syracuse (1992) and Boston College (1993); the American Conference retains the charter of the original Big East, following its 2013 realignment.
- Independent appearances: Boston College (1986) and Syracuse (1988).

== Game records ==
Team	Performance vs. opponent	Year
Most points scored (one team)	45, Tennessee vs. Northwestern	2016
Most points scored (losing team)	35, Northwestern vs. Auburn	2010
Most points scored (both teams)	73, Auburn vs. Northwestern	2010
Fewest points allowed	0, Clemson vs. Illinois	1991
Largest margin of victory	39, Tennessee vs. Northwestern	2016
Total yards	621, Northwestern vs. Auburn	2010
Rushing yards	400, Wisconsin vs. Auburn	2015
Passing yards	532, Northwestern vs. Auburn	2010
First downs	34, Northwestern vs. Auburn	2010
Fewest yards allowed	190, Alabama vs. Michigan	2024
Fewest rushing yards allowed	–15, Mississippi State vs. Iowa	2019
Fewest passing yards allowed	55, Florida vs. Iowa	2017
Individual	Performance, Player, Team	Year
Total offense	566, Mike Kafka Northwestern vs. Auburn (532 Pass, 34 Rush)	2010
Touchdowns (all-purpose)	4, Chris Perry (Michigan)	2003
Rushing yards	251, Melvin Gordon (Wisconsin)	2015
Rushing touchdowns	4, Chris Perry (Michigan)	2003
Passing yards	532, Mike Kafka (Northwestern)	2010
Passing touchdowns	4, most recent: Mike Kafka (Northwestern)	2010
Receiving yards	205, Tavarres King (Georgia)	2012
Receiving touchdowns	2, most recent: Tyler Johnson (Minnesota)	2020
Tackles	16, Traveon Henry (Northwestern)	2016
Sacks	3, most recent: David Pollack (Georgia)	2005
Interceptions	2, most recent: Chauncey Gardner-Johnson (Florida)	2017
Long Plays	Performance, Team/Player vs. opponent	Year
Touchdown run	77 yds., Jamie Morris (Michigan)	1988
Touchdown pass	85 yds., Austin Appleby to Mark Thompson (Florida)	2017
Kickoff return	96 yds., shared by: Jordan Cotton (Iowa); Noah Igbinoghene (Auburn)	2014; 2020
Punt return	92 yds., Brandon Boykin (Georgia)	2012
Interception return	100 yds., shared by: Walter McFadden (Auburn); Evan Berry (Tennessee)	2010; 2016
Fumble return	88 yds.,Tony Davis (Penn State)	2007
Punt	70 yds., Tyeler Dean (South Carolina)	2002
Field goal	53 yds., Charles Campbell (Indiana)	2021

== Media coverage ==
The inaugural edition of the bowl was carried by Mizlou in December 1986, with NBC carrying the next five editions (1988–1992). Since 1993, the game has been carried by ESPN or ESPN2, except for four broadcasts on ABC (2011, 2012, 2017, and 2021).
