= Craig Loston =

American football player (born 1989)

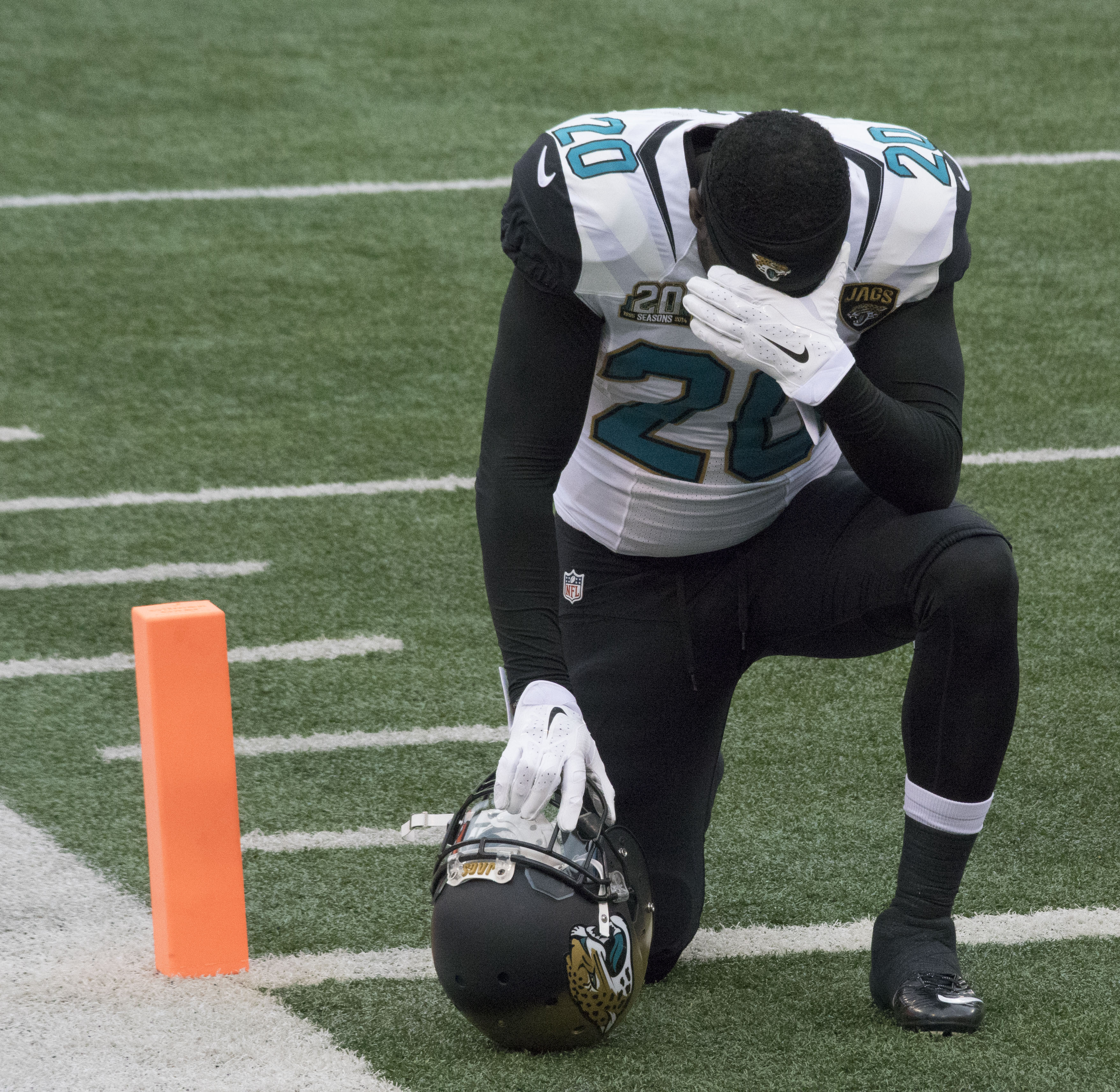
- Loston with the Jacksonville Jaguars in 2014

No. 20
- Position: Safety

Personal information
- Born: December 21, 1989 (age 36); Houston, Texas, U.S.
- Listed height: 6 ft 1 in (1.85 m)
- Listed weight: 217 lb (98 kg)

Career information
- High school: Eisenhower (Houston)
- College: Louisiana State
- NFL draft: 2014: undrafted

Career history
- Jacksonville Jaguars (2014–2015)

Awards and highlights
- Cotton Bowl champion (2011); Outback Bowl champion (2014); Second-team All-SEC (2012)

Career NFL statistics
- Total tackles: 3
- Stats at Pro Football Reference

Craig Anthony Loston Jr. (born December 21, 1989) is an American former professional football player who was a safety for the Jacksonville Jaguars of the National Football League (NFL). He played college football for the LSU Tigers, and signed with the Jaguars as an undrafted free agent in 2014.

== Early life ==
Loston attended Eisenhower High School in Houston, Texas, where he was a four-sport star in football, basketball, track and baseball. In track & field, he was timed at 10.4 seconds in the 100-meter dash.

Regarded as a five-star recruit, Loston was ranked as the best safety in the country by Rivals.com.

== College career ==
Loston played in two games as a true freshman in 2009 before suffering an injury and being redshirted. After spending 2010 and 2011 as a backup, he became a starter for the first time in 2012. He finished the season with 55 tackles and three interceptions. He nearly declared for the 2013 NFL draft, but returned for his senior season at LSU.

== Professional career ==
Pre-draft measurables
Height	Weight	Arm length	Hand span	40-yard dash	Bench press
5 ft 11 in (1.80 m)	217 lb (98 kg)	30 3/4 in (0.78 m)	9 3/4 in (0.25 m)	4.59 s	12 reps
All values from NFL Combine

Following the 2014 NFL draft, Loston was signed by the Jacksonville Jaguars as an undrafted free agent. The Jaguars released Loston on August 29, 2014. However, he was signed to the practice squad on August 31, 2014.

Loston was promoted to the active roster on September 13, 2014. He was released on September 20 and re-signed to the practice squad on September 22. He was once again elevated to the active roster on September 29.

He was released on September 5, 2015. He was signed to the practice squad on September 6, 2015. On October 14, 2015, he was released. On October 20, 2015, Loston was signed to the practice squad, but was released one day later. On October 27, 2015, he was re-signed to the practice squad. On November 18, 2015, Loston was promoted to the active roster.
