= Jeremy Hill =

American football player (born 1992)

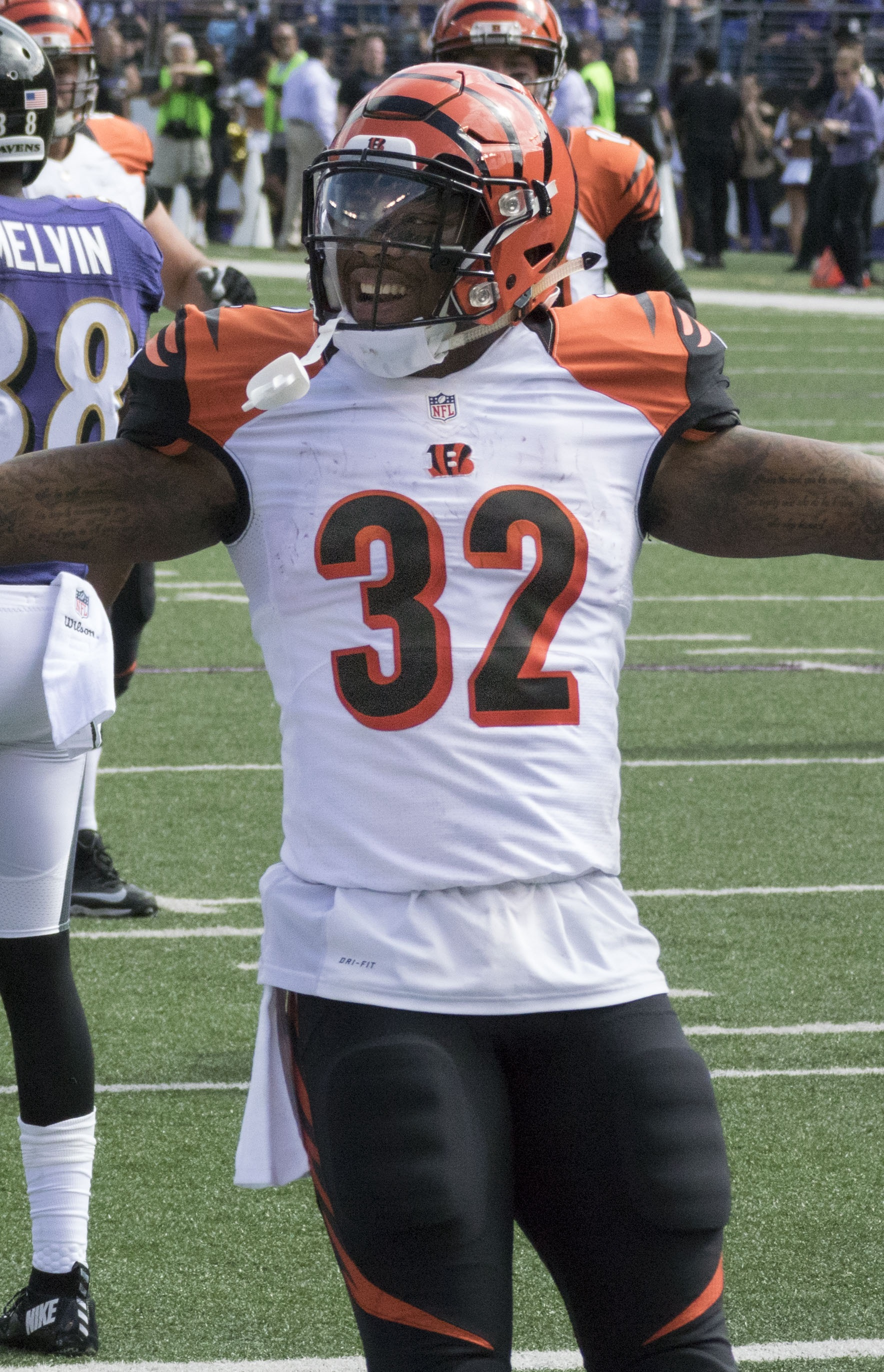
- Hill with the Cincinnati Bengals in 2015

No. 32, 33
- Position: Running back

Personal information
- Born: October 20, 1992 (age 34); Baton Rouge, Louisiana, U.S.
- Listed height: 6 ft 1 in (1.85 m)
- Listed weight: 230 lb (104 kg)

Career information
- High school: Redemptorist (Baton Rouge)
- College: LSU (2011–2013)
- NFL draft: 2014: 2nd round, 55th overall pick

Career history
- Cincinnati Bengals (2014–2017); New England Patriots (2018); Las Vegas Raiders (2020)*
- * Offseason or practice squad member only

Awards and highlights
- Super Bowl champion (LIII); NFL rushing touchdowns co-leader (2015); PFWA All-Rookie Team (2014); First-team All-SEC (2013)

Career NFL statistics
- Rushing yards: 2,898
- Rushing average: 4.1
- Rushing touchdowns: 29
- Receptions: 68
- Receiving yards: 490
- Receiving touchdowns: 1
- Stats at Pro Football Reference

Jeremy Hill (born October 20, 1992) is an American former professional football player who was a running back in the National Football League (NFL). He played college football for the LSU Tigers (LSU) and was selected by the Cincinnati Bengals in the second round of the 2014 NFL draft.

He spent his first four professional seasons with the Bengals, where he had a promising rookie year and remained as the Bengals' feature back for most of the next three years. He tied with three other players for most rushing touchdowns in 2015, but missed much of the 2017 season due to injury. He signed with the New England Patriots in 2018, with whom he won Super Bowl LIII, despite missing almost the entirety of the season due to injury. After a year away from football, Hill signed with the Las Vegas Raiders during the 2020 offseason, but was released two days later. After attempting a comeback in the XFL in 2022, Hill retired during the 2023 offseason.

== Early life ==
A native of Baton Rouge, Louisiana, Hill attended Redemptorist High School, where he was a three-sport athlete in football, baseball, and track. In football, Hill was an All-American running back for the Wolves. He was a teammate of future LSU offensive lineman La'el Collins. He finished his senior season in 2010 with 302 carries for 2,260 yards and 36 touchdowns.

Regarded as a four-star recruit by the Rivals.com recruiting service, Hill was listed as the No. 21 running back prospect in the class of 2011.

== College career ==
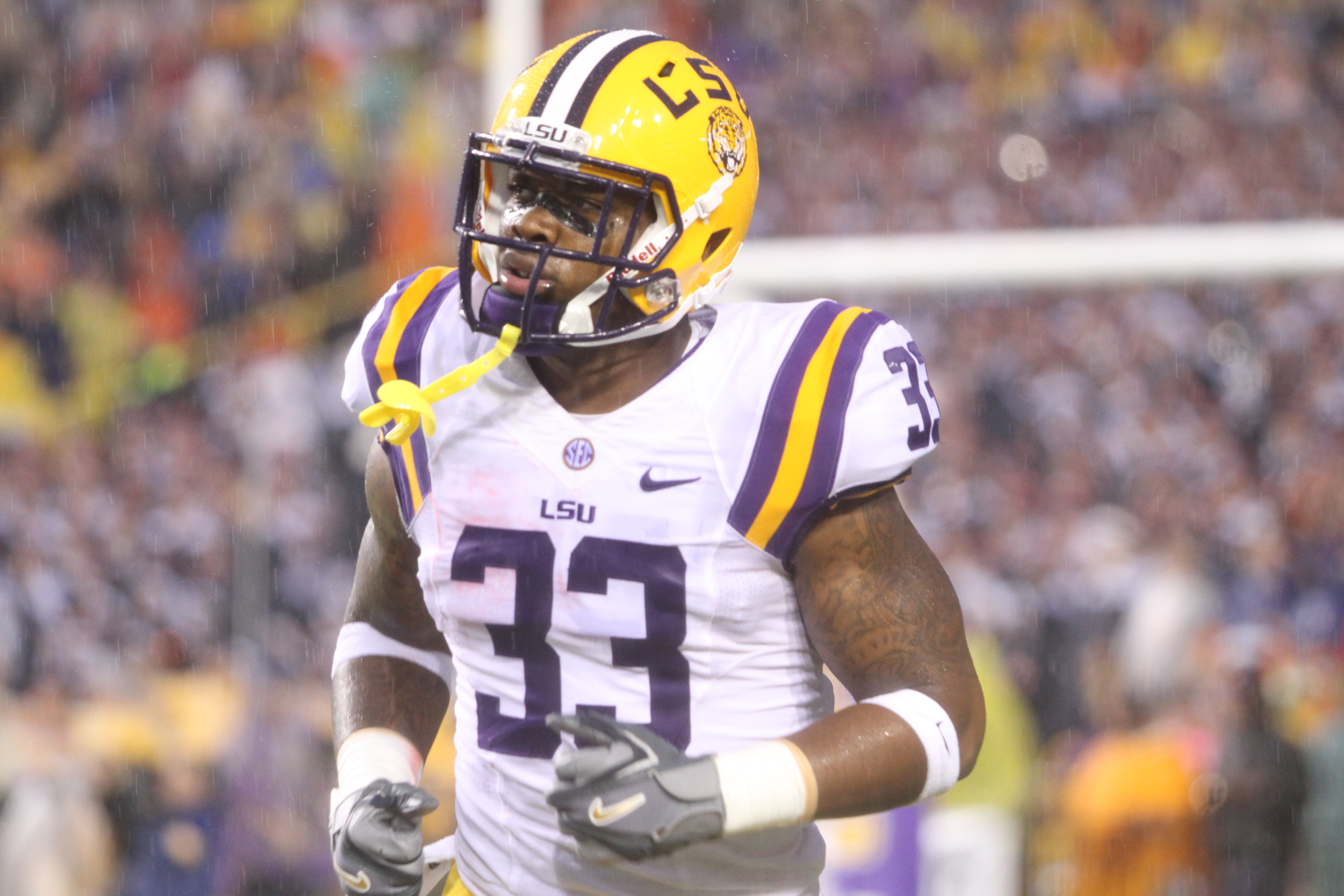
Hill with the LSU Tigers in 2013

Hill attended Louisiana State University, where he played for head coach Les Miles in the 2012 and 2013 seasons.

=== 2012 season ===
As a redshirt freshman in the 2012 season, Hill was an instant contributor. He combined with Spencer Ware, Kenny Hilliard, Michael Ford, Alfred Blue, and Russell Shepard to form one of the stronger rushing attacks in the Southeastern Conference (SEC). On September 15, Hill had 10 rushes for 61 yards and his first two collegiate touchdowns against Idaho. On October 6, in his first game in conference play, he had only two rushes for eight yards against Florida in their annual rivalry game. One week later, on October 13, he had 17 rushes for 124 yards and two touchdowns in a breakout performance against South Carolina. He followed the South Carolina game with another stellar performance on October 20, when he had 18 rushes for 127 yards and a touchdown against Texas A&M. He recorded his third consecutive game with at least 100 rushing yards on November 3, when he had 29 rushes for 107 yards and a touchdown against Alabama in their annual rivalry game. On November 17, he had 20 rushes for 77 yards and a career-high three touchdowns against Mississippi. On December 31, in the 2012 Chick-fil-A Bowl, he had 12 rushes for 124 yards and two touchdowns against Clemson.

Overall, in his freshman season, Hill had 142 rushes for 755 yards and 12 touchdowns.

=== 2013 season ===
As a sophomore in 2013, Hill had a stellar season. Veterans Hill, Blue, and Hilliard and newcomer Terrence Magee formed a strong rushing attack for the Tigers in the 2013 season. In the season opener on September 7, he had six rushes for 50 yards and a touchdown against Alabama-Birmingham. The next week, he followed that up with 11 rushes for 117 yards and two touchdowns against Kent State. On September 21, he had 25 rushes for a career-high 184 yards and three touchdowns against eventual SEC champion Auburn. A few weeks later on October 12, he had 19 rushes for 121 yards against Florida. On October 26, he had 14 rushes for 143 yards and two touchdowns against Furman. On November 29, in his last regular season game with the Tigers, Hill had 20 rushes for 145 yards and a touchdown against Arkansas. On January 1, 2014, he had 28 rushes for 216 yards and two touchdowns against Iowa in the 2014 Outback Bowl. He was named MVP of the bowl game following his great performance against the Hawkeyes.

Overall, in his last season with the Tigers, Hill had 203 rushes for 1,401 yards and 16 touchdowns. Hill was a first-team All-SEC selection.

== Professional career ==
Pre-draft measurables
Height	Weight	Arm length	Hand span	40-yard dash	10-yard split	20-yard split	20-yard shuttle	Three-cone drill	Vertical jump	Broad jump	Bench press	Wonderlic
6 ft 0 5/8 in (1.84 m)	233 lb (106 kg)	32 5/8 in (0.83 m)	10 3/8 in (0.26 m)	4.58 s	1.61 s	2.70 s	4.59 s	7.64 s	31 in (0.79 m)	9 ft 5 in (2.87 m)	20 reps	22
All values from NFL Combine/Pro Day

=== Cincinnati Bengals ===
==== 2014 season ====
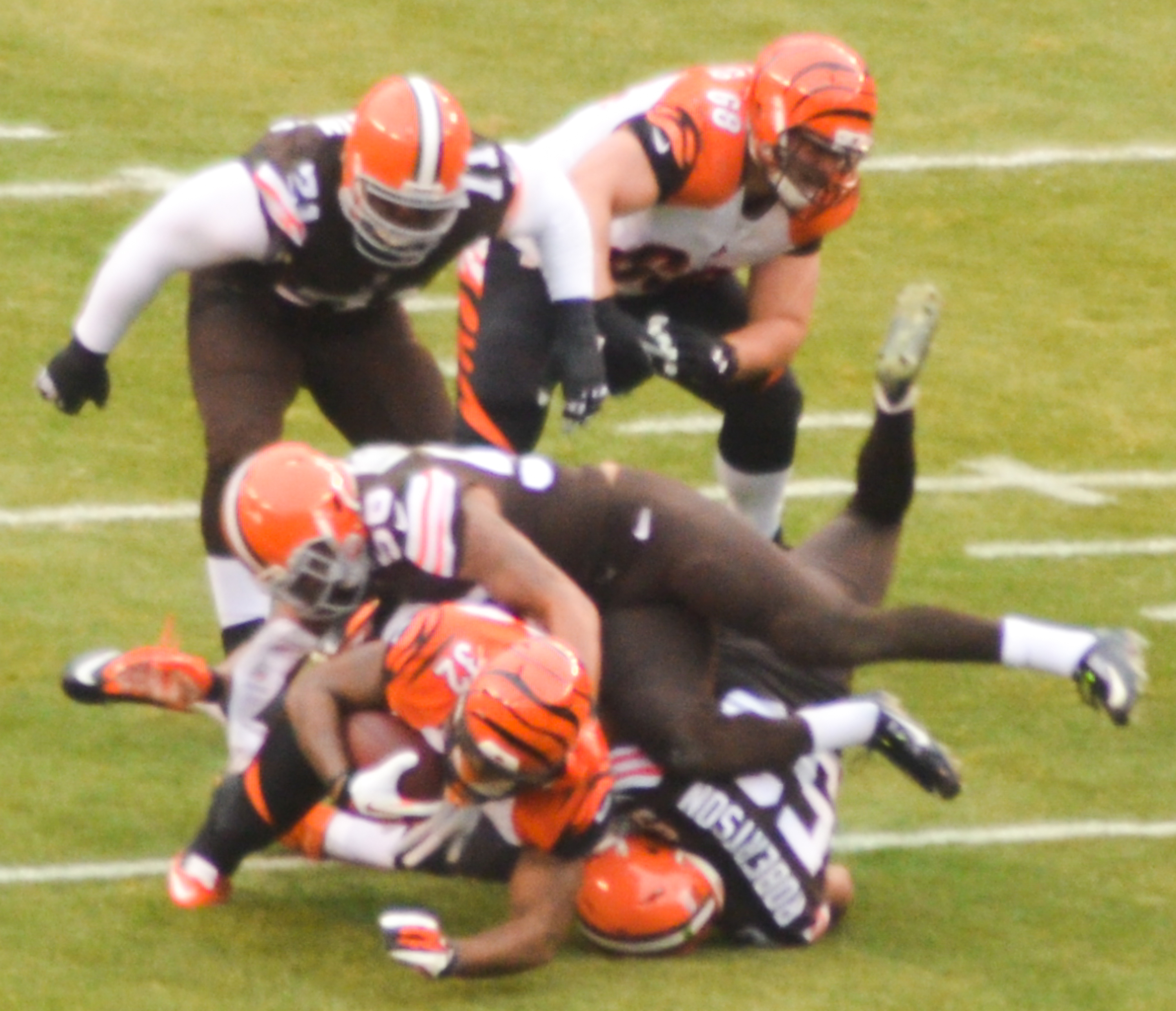
Hill being tackled in 2014

The Cincinnati Bengals drafted Hill in the second round, with the 55th overall pick, of the 2014 NFL draft. He was the second running back to be selected in the 2014 NFL draft. The only one drafted ahead of Hill was Bishop Sankey, who went one pick earlier to the Tennessee Titans. In addition, he was the third of nine LSU Tigers to be selected that year. On May 25, 2014, Hill signed his rookie contract, a four-year, $3.71 million contract with $1.64 million guaranteed.

Hill entered the regular season as the Bengals' backup running back behind second year player Giovani Bernard.

Hill made his professional regular season debut in the Bengals' season opener against the Baltimore Ravens on September 7, finishing with four carries for 19 rushing yards. The following week, he rushed for 74 yards on 15 rushing attempts and scored his first career touchdown on a one-yard run in the third quarter of the Bengals' 24–10 victory over the Atlanta Falcons. In addition, he made his first career reception during the game, finishing with two catches for 22 receiving yards. On October 5, Hill caught three passes for a season-high 68 yards during a 17–43 loss to the New England Patriots. On November 2, he earned his first career start during a victory over the Jacksonville Jaguars and finished with a total of a season-high 154 yards and two touchdowns. In Week 11, Hill had a season-high 27 carries for 152 rushing yards in a 27–10 victory over the New Orleans Saints. On December 14, he ran for 148 yards and two rushing touchdowns in the 30–0 victory over the Cleveland Browns to earn AFC Offensive Player of the Week honors. On December 22, Hill ran for 147 rushing yards on 22 carries and a touchdown, including a career-long 85-yard touchdown run in the first quarter victory over the Denver Broncos. The following week, he had 23 carries for 100 rushing yards in a 17–27 loss to the Pittsburgh Steelers. This marked Hill's fifth 100-yard performance and third straight.

Hill finished his rookie season with 222 carries for 1,124 rushing yards and nine rushing touchdowns.In addition, Hill accounted for 22 receptions for 215 receiving yards and appeared in a 16 of the Bengals' regular season games while starting nine. He became the first Bengals' rookie to top 1,000 yards rushing since Corey Dillon in 1997. His 1,124 rushing yards was the most among rookies and eighth-most in the NFL. His 5.1 yards per carry average ranked him second among NFL running backs, behind Justin Forsett of the Ravens. He was named to the All-Rookie Team for his 2014 season.

On January 4, 2015, Hill played in his first career playoff game and had 23 carries for 47 rushing yards, while scoring the Bengals' lone touchdown in a 26–10 loss to the Indianapolis Colts in the AFC Wild Card Round.

==== 2015 season ====
Hill started his second season as the Bengals' starting running back, ahead of Giovani Bernard on the depth chart.

Hill started the Bengals' season opener against the Oakland Raiders and had 19 carries for 63 rushing yards and two touchdowns as the Bengals won by a score of 33–13. The following week, he was benched in favor of Giovani Bernard after fumbling twice against the San Diego Chargers. He finished the game with only 10 carries for 39 rushing yards as Bernard ran for 123 yards, helping the Bengals win by a score of 24–10. On October 4, 2015, Hill had nine rushing attempts for 40 rushing yards and a career-high three touchdowns as the Bengals defeated the Kansas City Chiefs 36–21. In Week 6, Hill had 16 carries for 56 rushing yards and caught his first career touchdown reception on a 13-yard pass from quarterback Andy Dalton, as the Bengals defeated the Buffalo Bills. On December 6, 2015, Hill ran for a season-high 98 yards on 22 carries and a touchdown in the Bengals' 37–3 victory over the Cleveland Browns, his eighth touchdown of the season.

The play that Hill will likely be remembered for during his time in Cincinnati occurred on January 9, 2016. He ran for 50 yards on 12 carries and a touchdown in the Bengals' AFC Wild Card Round game against the Steelers. With 1:30 remaining in the fourth quarter, Hill fumbled the ball on the Pittsburgh 20-yard line, leading to a Steelers' recovery and 18–16 victory after the Bengals took a 16–15 lead with less than two minutes remaining in the game and got the ball back on a Vontaze Burfict interception. Hill finished the 2015 season with 794 yards on 223 rushes for an average of 3.6 yards per carry. He finished the season tied with Devonta Freeman of the Falcons, Adrian Peterson of the Minnesota Vikings, and DeAngelo Williams of the Steelers for most rushing touchdowns in the NFL with 11.

==== 2016 season ====
In Week 3, Hill had 17 carries for 97 yards and a season-high two touchdowns in a 17–29 loss to the Broncos. Hill's performance against the Broncos marked his seventh career game with multiple rushing touchdowns. On October 23, Hill had nine carries for a career-high 168 rushing yards and a touchdown in a 31–17 defeat of the Browns. His touchdown came on a season-high 74-yard run. The following week, Hill ran for 76 yards on 20 carries and a touchdown against the Washington Redskins. On December 11, Hill had 25 carries for 111 rushing yards and a touchdown in a win over the Browns. Hill finished the 2016 season with 839 yards and nine touchdowns on 222 carries.

==== 2017 season ====
Hill entered the 2017 season as the Bengals' lead back ahead of Giovani Bernard and rookie Joe Mixon. He started the first seven games, however he was overshadowed by the highly acclaimed Mixon, who amassed more than twice as many carries as Hill in seven games. He was placed on injured reserve on November 11, 2017, with an ankle injury, ending his season. Overall, he finished with 37 carries for 116 yards and four receptions for 16 yards.

=== New England Patriots ===
On March 17, 2018, Hill signed a one-year $1.5 million contract with the New England Patriots. Throughout training camp and the preseason, Hill competed primarily with Mike Gillislee as the team's power back. He won the job after an impressive preseason and was named the third running back on the depth chart behind Rex Burkhead and James White. In Week 1 against the Houston Texans, Hill exited the game in the third quarter after suffering an apparent knee injury. He was diagnosed with a torn ACL and ruled out for the season, being placed on injured reserve on September 10, 2018. The Patriots ultimately reached Super Bowl LIII where they defeated the Los Angeles Rams 13–3.

=== Las Vegas Raiders ===
Hill signed with the Las Vegas Raiders on August 3, 2020. He was released two days later.

=== Later career and retirement ===
Starting in August 2021, Hill began working as a local broadcaster on the sports-talk show "Hunt and Hill" with Hunt Palmer. On November 22, 2022, Hill left the show to attempt a professional football comeback in the XFL.

On May 23, 2023, Hill announced his retirement from football, citing the ACL tear he suffered in Week 1 of the 2018 season.

== Career statistics ==
=== NFL ===
Legend
	Led the league
**Bold**	Career high

==== Regular season ====
Year	Team	Games		Rushing					Receiving				
Year	Team	GP	GS	Att	Yds	Avg	Lng	TD	Rec	Yds	Avg	Lng	TD
2014	CIN	**16**	8	222	**1,124**	5.1	**85**	9	**27**	**215**	8.0	**38**	0
2015	CIN	**16**	**15**	**223**	794	3.6	38	**11**	15	79	5.3	14	**1**
2016	CIN	15	13	222	839	3.8	74	9	21	174	**8.3**	25	0
2017	CIN	7	7	37	116	3.1	13	0	4	16	4.0	10	0
2018	NWE	1	0	4	25	**6.3**	11	0	1	6	6.0	6	0
		55	43	708	2,898	4.1	85	29	68	490	7.2	38	1

==== Playoffs ====
Year	Team	Games		Rushing					Receiving				
Year	Team	GP	GS	Att	Yds	Avg	Lng	TD	Rec	Yds	Avg	Lng	TD
2014	CIN	**1**	**1**	**13**	47	3.6	18	**1**	0	0	0.0	0	0
2015	CIN	**1**	**1**	12	**50**	**4.2**	**38**	**1**	**3**	**27**	**9.0**	**13**	0
		2	2	25	97	3.9	38	2	3	27	9.0	13	0

=== College ===
Year	Team	Rushing					Receiving		
Year	Team	Att	Yds	Avg	Lng	TD	Rec	Yds	TD
2012	LSU	142	755	5.3	57	12	8	73	0
2013	LSU	203	1,401	6.9	69	16	18	181	0
**Career**		345	2,156	6.2	69	28	26	254	0

== Personal life ==
In January 2012, Hill pleaded guilty to carnal knowledge of a juvenile stemming from a January 2011 arrest. He was charged with oral sexual battery after pressuring a 14-year-old girl to perform the act on him. In April 2013, Hill was arrested and charged with assault after being involved in a bar fight and was filmed assaulting an unidentified 20-year-old. In September 2013, he pleaded guilty to simple battery.
