= 2013 LSU Tigers football team =

American college football season

2013 LSU Tigers football

Outback Bowl, W 21–14 (vacated) vs. Iowa
- Conference: Southeastern Conference
- Western Division

Ranking
- Coaches: No. 14
- AP: No. 14
- Record: 0–3, 10 wins vacated (0–3 SEC, 5 wins vacated)
- Head coach: Les Miles (9th season)
- Offensive coordinator: Cam Cameron (1st season)
- Offensive scheme: Air Coryell
- Defensive coordinator: John Chavis (5th season)
- Base defense: 4–3
- Home stadium: Tiger Stadium

2013 Southeastern Conference football standings
	Conf.			Overall
Team	W		L	W		L
Eastern Division
No. 5 Missouri x	7	–	1	12	–	2
No. 4 South Carolina	6	–	2	11	–	2
Georgia	5	–	3	8	–	5
No. 24 Vanderbilt	4	–	4	9	–	4
Florida	3	–	5	4	–	8
Tennessee	2	–	6	5	–	7
Kentucky	0	–	8	2	–	10
Western Division
No. 2 Auburn xy$	7	–	1	12	–	2
No. 7 Alabama x%	7	–	1	11	–	2
No. 14 LSU *	5	–	3	10	–	3
No. 18 Texas A&M	4	–	4	9	–	4
Mississippi State	3	–	5	7	–	6
Ole Miss *	3	–	5	8	–	5
Arkansas	0	–	8	3	–	9
Championship: Auburn 59, Missouri 42
$ – BCS representative as conference champion; % – BCS at-large representative; x – Division champion/co-champions; y – Championship game participant; * LSU and Ole Miss vacated all wins (except for Ole Miss' Music City Bowl win) due to NCAA violations.; Rankings from AP Poll

The 2013 LSU Tigers football team represented Louisiana State University as a member of the Western Division of the Southeastern Conference (SEC) during the 2012 NCAA Division I FBS football season. Led by ninth-year head coach Les Miles, the Tigers finished the season with an overall record of 10–3 and mark of 6–2 in conference play, tying for second place in the SEC's Western Division. LSU was invited to the Outback Bowl, where the Tigers beat Iowa. The team played home games at Tiger Stadium in Baton Rouge, Louisiana.

In 2023, the National Collegiate Athletic Association (NCAA) vacated all of LSU's wins from the 2012 through 2015 seasons due to an ineligible player.

== Offseason ==
Following the end of the 2012 season, LSU lost numerous players to the NFL draft, including ten underclassmen, the most of any other team. Key losses included second-team All Americans Kevin Minter and Eric Reid, third-team All American Sam Montgomery, and second-team All-SEC players Barkevious Mingo and Drew Alleman.

In February 2013, LSU announced that it had hired former Baltimore Ravens offensive coordinator, Cam Cameron, for the same position. Cameron served as the Ravens' offensive coordinator for five seasons. Cameron served for a single season as the head coach of the Miami Dolphins prior to joining the Ravens' staff. Prior to that, Cameron was the offensive coordinator for five seasons for the San Diego Chargers. Cameron had also previously spent time as part of the staff for the Michigan Wolverines alongside LSU head coach Les Miles for seven seasons from 1987 to 1993. Cameron will be replacing Greg Studrawa as LSU's offensive coordinator. Studrawa had spent the prior two seasons as offensive coordinator and offensive line coach. Studrawa was retained as the offensive line coach.

In 2023, all wins for the 2012 season were vacated by the NCAA.

=== Key departures ===
Name	Number	Pos.	Height	Weight	Year	Hometown	Notes
Lavar Edwards	89	DE	6'4"	277	Senior	Gretna, Louisiana	5th round draft pick (#142) to the Tennessee Titans
Chris Faulk	76	OT	6'5"	331	Junior	Slidell, Louisiana	Signed as an undrafted free agent with the Cleveland Browns
Michael Ford	42	RB	5'9"	210	Junior	Leesville, Louisiana	Signed as an undrafted free agent with the Chicago Bears
Bennie Logan	18	DT	6'2"	309	Junior	Coushatta, Louisiana	3rd round draft pick (#67) of the Philadelphia Eagles
P.J. Lonergan	64	C	6'4"	305	Senior	New Orleans, Louisiana	Signed as an undrafted free agent with the Chicago Bears
Barkevious Mingo	49	DE	6'4"	241	Junior	West Monroe, Louisiana	1st round draft pick (#6) of the Cleveland Browns
Kevin Minter	46	ILB	6'0"	246	Junior	Suwanee, Georgia	2nd round draft pick (#45) of the Arizona Cardinals
Sam Montgomery	99	DE	6'3"	262	Junior	Greenwood, South Carolina	3rd round draft pick (#95) of the Houston Texans
Eric Reid	1	S	6'1"	213	Junior	Geismar, Louisiana	1st round draft pick (#18) of the San Francisco 49ers
Russell Shepard	10	WR	6'0"	196	Senior	Houston, Texas	Signed as an undrafted free agent with the Philadelphia Eagles
Tharold Simon	24	CB	6'2"	202	Junior	Eunice, Louisiana	5th round draft pick (#138) to the Seattle Seahawks
Spencer Ware	11	RB	5'10"	228	Junior	Cincinnati, Ohio	6th round draft pick (#194) to the Seattle Seahawks
Brad Wing	38	P	6'2"	205	Sophomore	Melbourne, Australia	Signed as an undrafted free agent with the Philadelphia Eagles

=== Class of 2013 signees ===
College recruiting information
Name	Hometown	School	Height	Weight	Commit date
Maquedius Bain; DT	Fort Lauderdale, Florida	University School of Nova Southeastern University	6 ft 4 in (1.93 m)	299 lb (136 kg)	Jan 2, 2013
Maquedius Bain; DT	Recruit ratings: Scout: Rivals: ESPN:				
Kendell Beckwith; LB	Jackson, Louisiana	East Feliciana High School	6 ft 3 in (1.91 m)	224 lb (102 kg)	Jan 4, 2013
Kendell Beckwith; LB	Recruit ratings: Scout: Rivals: ESPN:				
Josh Boutte; OG	New Iberia, Louisiana	Westgate High School	6 ft 5 in (1.96 m)	313 lb (142 kg)	Feb 7, 2012
Josh Boutte; OG	Recruit ratings: Scout: Rivals: ESPN:				
Tashawn Bower; DE	Somerville, New Jersey	Immaculata High School	6 ft 5 in (1.96 m)	238 lb (108 kg)	Feb 6, 2013
Tashawn Bower; DE	Recruit ratings: Scout: Rivals: ESPN:				
Jeryl Brazil; CB	Loranger, Louisiana	Loranger High School	5 ft 10 in (1.78 m)	179 lb (81 kg)	Jan 29, 2013
Jeryl Brazil; CB	Recruit ratings: Scout: Rivals: ESPN:				
John Diarse; WR	Monroe, Louisiana	Neville High School	6 ft 0 in (1.83 m)	209 lb (95 kg)	Mar 17, 2012
John Diarse; WR	Recruit ratings: Scout: Rivals: ESPN:				
Andy Dodd; OG	Lindale, Georgia	Pepperell High School	6 ft 4 in (1.93 m)	313 lb (142 kg)	Jul 20, 2012
Andy Dodd; OG	Recruit ratings: Scout: Rivals: ESPN:				
Fehoko Fanaika; OG	Sacramento, California	College of San Mateo	6 ft 6 in (1.98 m)	340 lb (150 kg)	Mar 15, 2012
Fehoko Fanaika; OG	Recruit ratings: Scout: Rivals: ESPN:				
Greg Gilmore; DT	Hope Mills, North Carolina	South View High School	6 ft 4 in (1.93 m)	283 lb (128 kg)	Nov 8, 2012
Greg Gilmore; DT	Recruit ratings: Scout: Rivals: ESPN:				
Frank Herron; DE	Memphis, Tennessee	Central High School	6 ft 5 in (1.96 m)	265 lb (120 kg)	Jun 1, 2012
Frank Herron; DE	Recruit ratings: Scout: Rivals: ESPN:				
Rickey Jefferson; CB	Destrehan, Louisiana	Destrehan High School	6 ft 0 in (1.83 m)	183 lb (83 kg)	Jul 5, 2012
Rickey Jefferson; CB	Recruit ratings: Scout: Rivals: ESPN:				
Anthony Jennings; QB	Marietta, Georgia	Marietta High School	6 ft 2 in (1.88 m)	202 lb (92 kg)	Jun 7, 2012
Anthony Jennings; QB	Recruit ratings: Scout: Rivals: ESPN:				
Melvin Jones; LB	Lake Charles, Louisiana	Washington-Marion Magnet High School	6 ft 3 in (1.91 m)	246 lb (112 kg)	Jun 29, 2012
Melvin Jones; LB	Recruit ratings: Scout: Rivals: ESPN:				
Christian Lacouture; DE	Lincoln, Nebraska	Lincoln Southwest High School	6 ft 5 in (1.96 m)	273 lb (124 kg)	Nov 2, 2012
Christian Lacouture; DE	Recruit ratings: Scout: Rivals: ESPN:				
Quantavius Leslie; WR	Hogansville, Georgia	Hinds Community College	6 ft 4 in (1.93 m)	193 lb (88 kg)	May 16, 2012
Quantavius Leslie; WR	Recruit ratings: Scout: Rivals: ESPN:				
K.J. Malone; OG	Ruston, Louisiana	Cedar Creek High School	6 ft 4 in (1.93 m)	293 lb (133 kg)	Mar 31, 2012
K.J. Malone; OG	Recruit ratings: Scout: Rivals: ESPN:				
Lewis Neal; DE	Wilson, North Carolina	Hunt High School	6 ft 1 in (1.85 m)	236 lb (107 kg)	Jul 4, 2012
Lewis Neal; DE	Recruit ratings: Scout: Rivals: ESPN:				
Michael Patterson; DE	Winnfield, Louisiana	Winnfield Senior High School	6 ft 3 in (1.91 m)	235 lb (107 kg)	Mar 28, 2012
Michael Patterson; DE	Recruit ratings: Scout: Rivals: ESPN:				
Avery Peterson; WR	Pompano Beach, Florida	Hargrave Military Academy	6 ft 2 in (1.88 m)	183 lb (83 kg)	Dec 21, 2012
Avery Peterson; WR	Recruit ratings: Scout: Rivals: ESPN:				
Ethan Pocic; OT	Lemont, Illinois	Lemont High School	6 ft 6 in (1.98 m)	283 lb (128 kg)	May 29, 2012
Ethan Pocic; OT	Recruit ratings: Scout: Rivals: ESPN:				
Hayden Rettig; QB	Los Angeles, California	Cathedral High School	6 ft 4 in (1.93 m)	208 lb (94 kg)	May 22, 2012
Hayden Rettig; QB	Recruit ratings: Scout: Rivals: ESPN:				
Duke Riley; LB	River Ridge, Louisiana	John Curtis Christian High School	6 ft 1 in (1.85 m)	215 lb (98 kg)	Jan 30, 2013
Duke Riley; LB	Recruit ratings: Scout: Rivals: ESPN:				
Rashard Robinson; CB	Pompano Beach, Florida	Blanche Ely High School	6 ft 2 in (1.88 m)	169 lb (77 kg)	Jul 31, 2012
Rashard Robinson; CB	Recruit ratings: Scout: Rivals: ESPN:				
DeSean Smith; TE	Lake Charles, Louisiana	Barbe High School	6 ft 4 in (1.93 m)	221 lb (100 kg)	Jul 2, 2012
DeSean Smith; TE	Recruit ratings: Scout: Rivals: ESPN:				
Kevin Spears; WR	New Orleans, Louisiana	Holy Cross School	6 ft 3 in (1.91 m)	193 lb (88 kg)	Jan 19, 2013
Kevin Spears; WR	Recruit ratings: Scout: Rivals: ESPN:				
Logan Stokes; TE	Muscle Shoals, Alabama	Northeast Mississippi Community College	6 ft 4 in (1.93 m)	240 lb (110 kg)	May 26, 2012
Logan Stokes; TE	Recruit ratings: Scout: Rivals: ESPN:				
Tre'Davious White; CB	Shreveport, Louisiana	Green Oaks High School	5 ft 11 in (1.80 m)	175 lb (79 kg)	Feb 4, 2012
Tre'Davious White; CB	Recruit ratings: Scout: Rivals: ESPN:				
Overall recruit ranking: Scout: 9 Rivals: 6 ESPN: 7
Note: In many cases, Scout, Rivals, 247Sports, On3, and ESPN may conflict in their listings of height and weight.; In these cases, the average was taken. ESPN grades are on a 100-point scale.; Sources: "2013 LSU Football Commitment List". Rivals.; "Louisiana State College Football Recruiting Commits". Scout.; "LSU Tigers". ESPN.; "Scout.com Team Recruiting Rankings". Scout.; "2013 Team Ranking". Rivals.com.

== Coaching staff ==
Name	Position	Seasons at LSU	Alma mater
Les Miles	Head coach	9	Michigan (1976)
Cam Cameron	Offensive coordinator, Quarterbacks	1	Indiana (1983)
John Chavis	Defensive coordinator	5	Tennessee (1979)
Frank Wilson	Running backs, Recruiting coordinator	4	Nicholls State (1997)
Steve Ensminger	Tight ends	4	LSU (1982)
Brick Haley	Defensive line	5	Alabama A&M (1989)
Adam Henry	Wide receivers	2	McNeese State (1998)
Thomas McGaughey	Special teams	3	Houston (1996)
Corey Raymond	Defensive backs	2	LSU (1992)
Greg Studrawa	Offensive line	7	Bowling Green (1987)

== Depth chart ==
The official opening day depth chart was released on August 22, 2014.

Defense

FS
26 Ronald Martin, Jr
12 Corey Thompson, So
⋅

WLB	MIKE	SLB
58 Tahj Jones, Sr	31 D.J. Welter, Jr	18 Lamin Barrow, Sr
25 Kwon Alexander, Jr	23 Lamar Louis, So	45 Deion Jones, So
⋅	⋅	⋅

SS
6 Craig Loston, Sr
34 Micah Eugene, So
⋅

CB
28 Jalen Mills, So
13 Dwayne Thomas, Fr
⋅

DE	DT	DT	DE
94 Danielle Hunter, Jr	90 Anthony Johnson, Jr	9 Ego Ferguson, Jr	59 Jermauria Rasco, Jr
98 Jordan Allen, Jr	91 Christian LaCouture, Fr	95 Quentin Thomas, So	46 Tashawn Bower, Fr
⋅	⋅	⋅	⋅

CB
32 Jalen Collins, So
19 Derrick Raymond, Fr
16 Tre'Davious White, So

Offense

WR
3 Odell Beckham Jr., Jr
83 Travin Dural, Fr
82 James Wright, Sr

LT	LG	C	RG	RT
70 La'el Collins, Jr	74 Vadal Alexander, So	55 Elliott Porter, Jr	56 Trai Turner, So	65 Jerald Hawkins, Fr
76 Josh Boutte, Fr	71 Jonah Austin, So	77 Ethan Pocic, Fr	69 Fehoko Fanaika, Jr	75 Evan Washington, Jr
⋅	⋅	⋅	⋅	⋅

TE
41 Travis Dickson, Jr
85 Dillon Gordon, So
89 DeSean Smith, Fr

WR
80 Jarvis Landry, Jr
86 Kadron Boone, Sr
2 Avery Peterson, Fr

QB
8 Zach Mettenberger, Sr
10 Anthony Jennings, Fr
17 Stephen Rivers, So

FB
44 J. C. Copeland, Sr
43 Connor Neighbors, Sr
⋅

Special teams
PK 42 Colby Delahoussaye, Fr
PK 30 James Hairston, Jr
P 38 Jamie Keehn, So
KR 3 Odell Beckham Jr., Jr
PR 3 Odell Beckham Jr., Jr
LS 51 John Youmans, So
H 48 Seth Fruge, Jr

RB
33 Jeremy Hill, So
4 Alfred Blue, Sr
27 Kenny Hilliard, Jr

== Schedule ==
LSU's 2013 schedule was released by the Southeastern Conference and LSU on October 18, 2012.

Date	Time	Opponent	Rank	Site	TV	Result	Attendance
August 31	8:00 p.m.	vs. No. 20 TCU*	No. 12	AT&T Stadium; Arlington, TX (Cowboys Classic)	ESPN	W 37–27 (vacated)	80,230
September 7	6:37 p.m.	UAB*	No. 9	Tiger Stadium; Baton Rouge, LA	ESPNU	W 56–17 (vacated)	90,037
September 14	6:00 p.m.	Kent State*	No. 8	Tiger Stadium; Baton Rouge, LA	ESPNU	W 45–13 (vacated)	89,113
September 21	6:45 p.m.	Auburn	No. 6	Tiger Stadium; Baton Rouge, LA (Tiger Bowl)	ESPN	W 35–21 (vacated)	92,368
September 28	2:30 p.m.	at No. 9 Georgia	No. 6	Sanford Stadium; Athens, GA (College GameDay)	CBS	L 41–44	92,746
October 5	6:00 p.m.	at Mississippi State	No. 10	Davis Wade Stadium; Starkville, MS (rivalry)	ESPN	W 59–26 (vacated)	57,113
October 12	2:30 p.m.	No. 17 Florida	No. 10	Tiger Stadium; Baton Rouge, LA (rivalry)	CBS	W 17–6 (vacated)	92,980
October 19	6:00 p.m.	at Ole Miss	No. 6	Vaught–Hemingway Stadium; Oxford, MS (Magnolia Bowl)	ESPN2	L 24–27	61,160
October 26	6:00 p.m.	Furman*^{†}	No. 13	Tiger Stadium; Baton Rouge, LA	Tigervision PPV	W 49–16 (vacated)	92,554
November 9	7:00 p.m.	at No. 1 Alabama	No. 10	Bryant–Denny Stadium; Tuscaloosa, AL (rivalry) (College GameDay)	CBS	L 17–38	101,821
November 23	2:30 p.m.	No. 9 Texas A&M	No. 18	Tiger Stadium; Baton Rouge, LA (rivalry)	CBS	W 34–10 (vacated)	92,949
November 29	1:30 p.m.	Arkansas	No. 15	Tiger Stadium; Baton Rouge, LA (Battle for the Golden Boot)	CBS	W 31–27 (vacated)	89,656
January 1, 2014	Noon	vs. Iowa*	No. 14	Raymond James Stadium; Tampa, FL (Outback Bowl)	ESPN	W 21–14 (vacated)	51,296
*Non-conference game; ^{†}Homecoming; Rankings from AP Poll released prior to game; All times are in Central time

== Rankings ==
Ranking movements Legend: ██ Increase in ranking ██ Decrease in ranking
	Week																
Poll	Pre	1	2	3	4	5	6	7	8	9	10	11	12	13	14	15	Final
AP	12	9	8	6	6	10	10	6	13	11	10	18	18	15	14	14	14
Coaches	13	11	8	7	6	11	11	8	13	13	12	18	19	15	14	14	14
Harris	Not released							8	12	12	11	17	17	14	14	14	Not released
BCS	Not released								13	13	13	21	22	17	15	16	Not released

== Game summaries ==
=== TCU ===
	1	2	3	4	Total
#12 LSU	6	10	14	7	37
#20 TCU	3	7	7	10	27

=== UAB ===
	1	2	3	4	Total
UAB	0	17	0	0	17
#9 LSU	21	14	21	0	56

=== Kent State ===
	1	2	3	4	Total
Kent State	0	10	3	0	13
#8 LSU	21	10	0	14	45

=== Auburn ===
	1	2	3	4	Total
Auburn	0	0	14	7	21
#6 LSU	14	7	7	7	35

=== Georgia ===
	1	2	3	4	Total
#6 LSU	14	3	10	14	41
#9 Georgia	14	10	10	10	44

=== Mississippi State ===
	1	2	3	4	Total
#10 LSU	14	14	3	28	59
Mississippi State	9	14	3	0	26

=== Florida ===
	1	2	3	4	Total
#17 Florida	3	0	0	3	6
#10 LSU	0	14	0	3	17

=== Ole Miss ===
	1	2	3	4	Total
#6 LSU	0	0	14	10	24
Ole Miss	3	7	14	3	27

=== Furman ===
	1	2	3	4	Total
Furman	10	6	0	0	16
#13 LSU	13	7	14	14	48

=== Alabama ===
	1	2	3	4	Total
#10 LSU	0	14	3	0	17
#1 Alabama	3	14	7	14	38

=== Texas A&M ===
	1	2	3	4	Total
#9 Texas A&M	0	10	0	0	10
#18 LSU	7	14	10	3	34

=== Arkansas ===
	1	2	3	4	Total
Arkansas	7	10	10	0	27
#15 LSU	14	0	7	10	31

=== Iowa ===
	1	2	3	4	Total
Iowa	0	0	7	7	14
#14 LSU	7	7	0	7	21
