= 2013 Iowa Hawkeyes football team =

American college football season

2013 Iowa Hawkeyes football

Outback Bowl, L 14–21 vs. LSU
- Conference: Big Ten Conference
- Legends Division
- Record: 8–5 (5–3 Big Ten)
- Head coach: Kirk Ferentz (15th season)
- Offensive coordinator: Greg Davis (2nd season)
- Offensive scheme: Multiple
- Defensive coordinator: Phil Parker (2nd season)
- Base defense: 4–3
- Home stadium: Kinnick Stadium

2013 Big Ten Conference football standings
	Conf.			Overall
Team	W		L	W		L
Legends Division
No. 3 Michigan State x$	8	–	0	13	–	1
Iowa	5	–	3	8	–	5
Nebraska	5	–	3	9	–	4
Minnesota	4	–	4	8	–	5
Michigan	3	–	5	7	–	6
Northwestern	1	–	7	5	–	7
Leaders Division
No. 12 Ohio State x%	8	–	0	12	–	2
No. 22 Wisconsin	6	–	2	9	–	4
Penn State*	4	–	4	7	–	5
Indiana	3	–	5	5	–	7
Illinois	1	–	7	4	–	8
Purdue	0	–	8	1	–	11
Championship: Michigan State 34, Ohio State 24
$ – BCS representative as conference champion; % – BCS at-large representative; x – Division champion/co-champions; Penn State ineligible for conference championship game and post-season bowl games due to NCAA sanctions; Rankings from AP Poll

The 2013 Iowa Hawkeyes football team represented the University of Iowa in the 2013 NCAA Division I FBS football season. They were led by 15th year head coach Kirk Ferentz and played their home games at Kinnick Stadium. They were a member of the Legends Division of the Big Ten Conference. They finished the season 8–5, 5–3 in Big Ten play to finish in a tie for second place in the Legends Division. They were invited to the Outback Bowl where they lost to LSU.

== 2013 commitments ==
College recruiting
Name	Hometown	School	Height	Weight	40^{‡}	Commit date
Nathan Bazata; DT	Howells, NE	Howells High School	6 ft 2 in (1.88 m)	273 lb (124 kg)	4.9	Apr 22, 2012
Nathan Bazata; DT	Recruit ratings: Scout: Rivals: ESPN: (72)					
Ike Boettger; TE	Cedar Falls, IA	Cedar Falls High School	6 ft 5 in (1.96 m)	220 lb (100 kg)	4.6	Jun 24, 2012
Ike Boettger; TE	Recruit ratings: Scout: Rivals: ESPN: (69)					
LaShun Daniels; RB	Warren, Ohio	Warren G. Harding High School	5 ft 11 in (1.80 m)	217 lb (98 kg)	4.6	Dec 14, 2012
LaShun Daniels; RB	Recruit ratings: Scout: Rivals: ESPN: (71)					
Colin Goebel; G	Naperville, IL	Naperville North High School	6 ft 4 in (1.93 m)	275 lb (125 kg)	5.0	Apr 21, 2012
Colin Goebel; G	Recruit ratings: Scout: Rivals: ESPN: (79)					
Brant Gressel; DT	Centerville, OH	Centerville High School	6 ft 2 in (1.88 m)	279 lb (127 kg)	5.1	Apr 23, 2012
Brant Gressel; DT	Recruit ratings: Scout: Rivals: ESPN: (76)					
Andre Harris; ATH	Kirkwood, MO	Kirkwood High School	6 ft 0 in (1.83 m)	162 lb (73 kg)	4.4	Jun 22, 2012
Andre Harris; ATH	Recruit ratings: Scout: Rivals: ESPN: (78)					
Josey Jewell; OLB	Decorah, IA	Decorah Community Sr. High School	6 ft 2 in (1.88 m)	200 lb (91 kg)	4.7	Feb 4, 2013
Josey Jewell; OLB	Recruit ratings: Scout: Rivals: ESPN: (NR)					
Anjeus Jones; WR	Dallas, TX	South Oak Cliff High School	6 ft 3 in (1.91 m)	193 lb (88 kg)	4.5	Feb 3, 2013
Anjeus Jones; WR	Recruit ratings: Scout: Rivals: ESPN: (NR)					
John Kenny; OLB	Carmel, IN	Carmel High School	6 ft 2 in (1.88 m)	212 lb (96 kg)	4.6	Apr 27, 2012
John Kenny; OLB	Recruit ratings: Scout: Rivals: ESPN: (79)					
Desmond King; ATH	Detroit, MI	Crockett Technical High School	5 ft 11 in (1.80 m)	182 lb (83 kg)	4.6	Jan 27, 2013
Desmond King; ATH	Recruit ratings: Scout: Rivals: ESPN: (73)					
Tyler Kluver; LS	Marshalltown, IA	Marshalltown High School	6 ft 0 in (1.83 m)	215 lb (98 kg)	NA	Dec 19, 2012
Tyler Kluver; LS	Recruit ratings: Scout: Rivals: ESPN: (68)					
Derrick Mitchell Jr. ATH	St. Louis, MO	Vashon High School	6 ft 0 in (1.83 m)	170 lb (77 kg)	4.5	Jun 21, 2012
Derrick Mitchell Jr. ATH	Recruit ratings: Scout: Rivals: ESPN: (76)					
Jonathan Parker; RB	St. Louis, MO	Christian Brothers College High School	5 ft 11 in (1.80 m)	180 lb (82 kg)	4.6	Feb 6, 2013
Jonathan Parker; RB	Recruit ratings: Scout: Rivals: ESPN: (NR)					
Damond Powell; WR	Ephraim, UT	Snow College	5 ft 11 in (1.80 m)	175 lb (79 kg)	4.4	Dec 9, 2012
Damond Powell; WR	Recruit ratings: Scout: Rivals: ESPN: (77)					
Malik Rucker; S	New Hope, MN	Robbinsdale Cooper High School	5 ft 11 in (1.80 m)	175 lb (79 kg)	4.4	Jun 15, 2012
Malik Rucker; S	Recruit ratings: Scout: Rivals: ESPN: (77)					
Nic Shimonek; QB	Corsicana, TX	Mildred High School	6 ft 4 in (1.93 m)	200 lb (91 kg)	4.9	May 17, 2012
Nic Shimonek; QB	Recruit ratings: Scout: Rivals: ESPN: (74)					
Reggie Spearman; OLB	Chicago, IL	Simeon High School	6 ft 2 in (1.88 m)	213 lb (97 kg)	4.7	Feb 5, 2013
Reggie Spearman; OLB	Recruit ratings: Scout: Rivals: ESPN: (79)					
Matt Vandeberg; WR	Brandon, SD	Brandon Valley High School	6 ft 1 in (1.85 m)	170 lb (77 kg)	NA	Aug 13, 2012
Matt Vandeberg; WR	Recruit ratings: Scout: Rivals: ESPN: (71)					
Akrum Wadley; ATH	Newark, NJ	Weequahic High School	5 ft 11 in (1.80 m)	175 lb (79 kg)	4.4	Feb 3, 2013
Akrum Wadley; ATH	Recruit ratings: Scout: Rivals: ESPN: (NR)					
Solomon Warfield; S	Lakewood, OH	St. Edward High School	6 ft 0 in (1.83 m)	175 lb (79 kg)	4.5	Jun 24, 2012
Solomon Warfield; S	Recruit ratings: Scout: Rivals: ESPN: (77)					
Sean Welsh; G	Springboro, OH	Springboro High School	6 ft 3 in (1.91 m)	275 lb (125 kg)	5.1	Jun 22, 2012
Sean Welsh; G	Recruit ratings: Scout: Rivals: ESPN: (79)					
Derrick Willies; WR	Rock Island, IL	Rock Island High School	6 ft 3 in (1.91 m)	193 lb (88 kg)	4.4	Apr 10, 2012
Derrick Willies; WR	Recruit ratings: Scout: Rivals: ESPN: (74)					
Jon Wisnieski; TE	West Des Moines, IA	Dowling Catholic High School	6 ft 5 in (1.96 m)	215 lb (98 kg)	4.8	Jul 12, 2012
Jon Wisnieski; TE	Recruit ratings: Scout: Rivals: ESPN: (80)					
Overall recruit ranking:
Note: In many cases, Scout, Rivals, 247Sports, On3, and ESPN may conflict in their listings of height and weight.; In these cases, the average was taken. ESPN grades are on a 100-point scale.; Sources: "ESPN- College Football Recruiting Schools". ESPN.; "2013 Team Ranking". Rivals.com.

== Schedule ==
Date	Time	Opponent	Site	TV	Result	Attendance
August 31	2:30 pm	Northern Illinois*	Kinnick Stadium; Iowa City, IA	BTN	L 27–30	67,402
September 7	11:00 am	Missouri State*	Kinnick Stadium; Iowa City, IA	BTN	W 28–14	64,201
September 14	5:00 pm	at Iowa State*	Jack Trice Stadium; Ames, IA (Battle for the Cy-Hawk Trophy)	FS1	W 27–21	56,800
September 21	11:00 am	Western Michigan*	Kinnick Stadium; Iowa City, IA	BTN	W 59–3	66,886
September 28	2:30 pm	at Minnesota	TCF Bank Stadium; Minneapolis, MN (rivalry)	ABC, ESPN2	W 23–7	51,382
October 5	11:00 am	Michigan State^{†}	Kinnick Stadium; Iowa City, IA	ESPN2	L 14–26	69,025
October 19	2:30 pm	at No. 4 Ohio State	Ohio Stadium; Columbus, OH	ABC, ESPN2	L 24–34	105,264
October 26	11:00 am	Northwestern	Kinnick Stadium; Iowa City, IA	BTN	W 17–10 ^{OT}	66,838
November 2	11:00 am	No. 22 Wisconsin	Kinnick Stadium; Iowa City, IA (rivalry)	ABC, ESPN2	L 9–28	69,812
November 9	11:00 am	at Purdue	Ross–Ade Stadium; West Lafayette, IN	BTN	W 38–14	41,038
November 23	11:00 am	Michigan	Kinnick Stadium; Iowa City, IA	BTN	W 24–21	65,708
November 29	11:00 am	at Nebraska	Memorial Stadium; Lincoln, NE (rivalry)	ABC	W 38–17	91,260
January 1	12:00 pm	vs. No. 14 LSU*	Raymond James Stadium; Tampa, FL (Outback Bowl)	ESPN	L 14–21	51,296
*Non-conference game; ^{†}Homecoming; Rankings from AP Poll released prior to the game; All times are in Central time

== Roster ==
2013 Iowa Hawkeyes football team roster
Players
Coaches
Offense

Pos.	#	Name	Class
QB	16	C. J. Beathard	Fr
QB	6	Justin Joyce	Fr
QB	15	Jake Rudock	So
QB	9	Nic Shimonek	Fr
QB	19	Cody Sokol	Sr
RB	5	Damon Bullock	Jr
RB	33	Jordan Canzeri	So
RB	34	Adam Cox	So
RB	29	LeShun Daniels Jr.	Fr
RB	40	Berkley Grimm	So
RB	3	Barkley Hill	Fr
RB	26	Michael Malloy	Fr
RB	10	Jonathan Parker	Fr
RB	42	Macon Plewa	So
RB	31	Akrum Wadley	Fr
RB	45	Mark Weisman	Jr
RB	32	Andrew Wellik	Fr
WR	23	Jordan Cotton	Sr
WR	28	Maurice Fleming	Fr
WR	21	Trev Hadachek	Fr
WR	9	Blake Haluska	Jr
WR	84	Andre Harris	Fr
WR	84	Jacob Hillyer	So
WR	88	A. J. Jones	Fr
WR	14	Conner Keane	Fr
WR	11	Kevonte Martin-Manley	Jr
WR	83	Riley McCarron	Fr
WR	85	Derrick Mitchell, Jr.	Fr
WR	22	Damond Powell	Jr
WR	8	Don Shumpert	Sr
WR	81	Tevaun Smith	So
WR	20	Andrew Stone	So
WR	89	Matt VandeBerg	Fr
WR	18	Derrick Willies	Fr
WR	7	Drew Zaun	Fr
TE	48	Ike Boettger	Fr
TE	87	Jake Duzey	So
TE	86	C. J. Fiedorowicz	Sr
TE	82	Ray Hamilton	Jr
TE	46	George Kittle	Fr
TE	80	Henry Krieger-Coble	So
TE	92	Peter Pekar	Fr
TE	81	Jon Wisnieski	Fr
OL	63	Austin Blythe	So
OL	59	Conor Boffeli	Sr
OL	60	Jalen Chambers	Fr
OL	64	Cole Croston	Fr
OL	78	Andrew Donnal	Jr
OL	54	Steve Ferentz	Fr
OL	57	Tommy Gaul	Jr
OL	66	Colin Goebel	Fr
OL	74	Mitch Keppy	Fr
OL	76	Nolan MacMillan	Sr
OL	52	Boone Myers	Fr
OL	55	Tanner Olde	Fr
OL	71	Richard Pryor, Jr.	Fr
OL	68	Brandon Scherff	Jr
OL	77	Reid Sealby	Fr
OL	58	Eric Simmons	So
OL	61	Christopher Smull	Fr
OL	70	Brett Van Sloten	Sr
OL	65	Jordan Walsh	So
OL	73	Ryan Ward	Fr
OL	79	Sean Welsh	Fr

Defense

Pos.	#	Name	Class
DL	79	Dominic Alvis	Sr
DL	99	Nathan Bazata	Fr
DL	78	Corbin Blythe	Fr
DL	97	Darian Cooper	So
DL	71	Carl Davis	Jr
DL	56	Faith Ekakitie	Fr
DL	77	Daniel Gaffney	Fr
DL	72	Brant Gressel	Fr
DL	98	Mike Hardy	Jr
DL	88	Jake Hulett	Fr
DL	67	Jaleel Johnson	Fr
DL	92	Will Kincart	Fr
DL	94	Riley McMinn	So
DL	34	Nate Meier	So
DL	95	Drew Ott	So
DL	87	Wil Rathjen	Jr
DL	90	Louis Trinca-Pasat	Jr
DL	75	Dean Tsopanides	So
DL	91	Daumantas Venckus-Cucchiara	Fr
LB	52	Quinton Alston	Jr
LB	55	Marcus Collins	Jr
LB	36	Cole Fisher	So
LB	50	Palmer Foster	Jr
LB	46	Chab Gilson	Jr
LB	31	Anthony Hitchens	Sr
LB	43	Josey Jewell	Fr
LB	47	John Kenny	Fr
LB	20	Christian Kirksey	Sr
LB	54	Drake Kulick	Fr
LB	48	Luke Lindahl	Fr
LB	44	James Morris	Sr
LB	38	Dalton Shaull	Fr
LB	6	Reggie Spearman	Fr
LB	49	Melvin Spears	So
LB	51	Laron Taylor	Fr
DB	41	Bo Bower	Fr
DB	3	Paul Brown	Fr
DB	7	Sean Draper	So
DB	12	Anthony Gair	Fr
DB	30	Desmond King	Fr
DB	21	Nico Law	Jr
DB	25	Ruben Lile	Fr
DB	27	Jordan Lomax	Jr
DB	37	John Lowdermilk	Jr
DB	19	B.J. Lowery	Sr
DB	13	Greg Mabin	Fr
DB	5	Tanner Miller	Sr
DB	29	Dayo Ogundepo	Fr
DB	39	Travis Perry	So
DB	2	Malik Rucker	Fr
DB	30	Sean Skradis	So
DB	35	Gavin Smith	Sr
DB	11	David Tann	Fr
DB	26	Kevin Ward	Fr
DB	32	Solomon Warfield	Fr

Special teams

Pos.	#	Name	Class
K	93	Alden Haffar	Jr
K	1	Marshall Koehn	So
K	96	Mike Meyer	Sr
P	98	Connor Kornbrath	So
LS	97	Tyler Kluver	Fr
LS	61	Casey Kreiter	Sr

Head coach

- Kirk Ferentz

Coordinators/assistant coaches

- Greg Davis – Offensive Coordinator and Quarterbacks
- Phil Parker – Defensive Coordinator
- Brian Ferentz – Offensive Line
- Eric Johnson – Recruiting Coordinator and Assistant Defensive Line
- Bobby Kennedy – Wide Receivers
- Reese Morgan – Defensive Line
- Jim Reid – Defensive Assistant
- Chris White – Running Backs and Special Teams
- LeVar Woods – Linebackers
- Chris Doyle – Strength and Conditioning
- Dustyn Baethke – Strength and Conditioning Assistant
- Tyler Barnes – Administrative Assistant
- Kelvin Bell – Special Teams Graduate Assistant
- DJ Hernandez – Offensive Graduate Assistant
- Chris Polizzi – Defensive Graduate Assistant
- Austin Showalter – Offensive Graduate Assistant
- Joel Welsh, Jr. – Strength and Conditioning Assistant Coach
- Doug West – Senior Athletic Trainer
- Ned Amendola, M.D. – Director, UI Sports Medicine Center
- Raimond Braithwaite – Strength and Conditioning Assistant
- Chic Ejiasi – Director of Player Development
- Paul Federici – Director of Football Operations
- Russ Haynes – Associate Director, Athletic Training Services
- Bob Rahfeldt – Assistant Video Coordinator
- Scott Southmayd – Quality Control Director

Legend

- (C) Team captain
- (S) Suspended
- (I) Ineligible
- Injured
- Redshirt

Roster
Last update: 8/18/13

== Regular season ==
=== Northern Illinois ===
Northern Illinois at Iowa

Team	1	2	3	4	Total
• Huskies	10	7	3	10	30
Hawkeyes	7	17	0	3	27

- Date: August 31
- Location: Kinnick Stadium
  Iowa City, IA
- Game start: 2:30 p.m. CDT
- Elapsed time: 3:37
- Game attendance: 67,402
- Game weather: 85 °F (29 °C), Sunny, Wind 7 mph (11 km/h) NE
- Referee: Dave Witvoet
- TV announcers (BTN): Paul Burmeister, Chuck Long, Danan Hughes
- Source: Box Score

Scoring summary
1	7:33	Northern Illinois	Mathew Sims 47-yard field goal	Northern Illinois 3–0
1	3:47	Northern Illinois	Tommylee Lewis 40-yard pass from Jordan Lynch (Mathew Sims kick)	Northern Illinois 10–0
1	0:27	Iowa	Christian Kirksey 52-yard fumble recovery (Mike Meyer kick)	Northern Illinois 10–7
2	8:24	Iowa	Mike Meyer 28-yard field goal	Tied 10–10
2	6:32	Iowa	CJ Fiedorowicz 11-yard pass from Jake Rudock (Mike Meyer kick)	Iowa 17–10
2	3:49	Northern Illinois	Tommylee Lewis 21-yard pass from Jordan Lynch (Mathew Sims kick)	Tied 17–17
2	0:53	Iowa	Jake Rudock 6-yard run (Mike Meyer kick)	Iowa 24–17
3	1:13	Northern Illinois	Mathew Sims 25-yard field goal	Iowa 24–20
4	6:42	Iowa	Mike Meyer 44-yard field goal	Iowa 27–20
4	5:05	Northern Illinois	Da'Ron Brown 33-yard pass from Jordan Lynch (Mathew Sims kick)	Tied 27–27
4	0:04	Northern Illinois	Mathew Sims 36-yard field goal	Northern Illinois 30–27

=== Missouri State ===
Missouri State at Iowa

Team	1	2	3	4	Total
Bears	0	0	0	14	14
• Hawkeyes	7	0	14	7	28

- Date: September 7
- Location: Kinnick Stadium
  Iowa City, IA
- Game start: 11:00 a.m. CDT
- Elapsed time: 3:00
- Game attendance: 64,201
- Game weather: 80 °F (27 °C), Sunny, Wind SSW 11 mph (18 km/h)
- Referee: Mike Cannon
- TV announcers (BTN): Steve Physioc, Danan Hughes
- Source: Box Score

Scoring summary
1	5:14	Iowa	Jake Rudock 6-yard run (Mike Meyer kick)	Iowa 7–0
3	7:11	Iowa	Mark Weisman 10-yard run (Mike Meyer kick)	Iowa 14–0
3	2:12	Iowa	Mark Weisman 3-yard run (Mike Meyer kick)	Iowa 21–0
4	14:25	Missouri State	Julian Burton 27-yard pass from Kierra Harris (Austin Witmer kick)	Iowa 21–7
4	14:15	Missouri State	Rique Bentley 28-yard interception return (Austin Witmer kick)	Iowa 21–14
4	9:57	Iowa	Jake Rudock 2-yard Run (Mike Meyer kick)	Iowa 28–14

FCS opponent MSU was able to play with Iowa but the Hawkeyes ultimately prevailed.

=== At Iowa State ===
Iowa at Iowa State
Battle for the Cy-Hawk Trophy

Team	1	2	3	4	Total
• Hawkeyes	0	13	7	7	27
Cyclones	0	0	7	14	21

- Date: September 14
- Location: Jack Trice Stadium
  Ames, IA
- Game start: 5:00 p.m. CDT
- Elapsed time: 3:14
- Game attendance: 56,800
- Game weather: 75 °F (24 °C), Partly Cloudy, Wind S 5–10 mph (8.0–16.1 km/h)
- Referee: Bill LeMonnier
- TV announcers (FS1): Justin Kutcher, James Bates, Brady Poppinga
- Source: Box Score

Scoring summary
2	12:17	Iowa	Kevonte Martin-Manley 5-yard pass From Jake Rudock (Mike Meyer kick)	Iowa 7–0
2	1:43	Iowa	Mike Meyer 27-yard field goal	Iowa 10–0
2	0:10	Iowa	Mike Meyer 38-yard field goal	Iowa 13–0
3	5:28	Iowa State	Quenton Bundrage 67-yard pass from Sam B. Richardson (Cole Netten kick)	Iowa 13–7
3	0:41	Iowa	Jacob Hillyer 26-yard pass from Jake Rudock (Mike Meyer kick)	Iowa 20–7
4	7:05	Iowa	Jake Rudock 1-yard run (Mike Meyer kick)	Iowa 27–7
4	4:27	Iowa State	Quenton Bundrage 26-yard pass from Sam B. Richardson (Cole Netten kick)	Iowa 27–14
4	2:26	Iowa State	Quenton Bundrage 17-yard pass from Sam B. Richardson (Cole Netten kick)	Iowa 27–21

Both teams struggled in this annual contest but the Iowa defense created key turnovers that led to a win.

=== Western Michigan ===
Western Michigan at Iowa

Team	1	2	3	4	Total
Broncos	0	3	0	0	3
• Hawkeyes	10	28	14	7	59

- Date: September 21
- Location: Kinnick Stadium
  Iowa City, IA
- Game start: 11:00 a.m.
- Elapsed time: 3:02
- Game attendance: 66,886
- Game weather: 63 °F (17 °C), Sunny, Wind 11 mph (18 km/h) NW
- Referee: Jerry McGinn
- TV announcers (BTN): Wayne Larrivee, Jon Jansen
- Source: Box Score

Scoring summary
1	9:42	Iowa	Mike Meyer 20-yard field goal	Iowa 3–0
1	1:54	Iowa	Jacob Hillyer 21-yard pass from Jake Rudock (Mike Meyer kick)	Iowa 10–0
2	11:45	Iowa	Kevonte Martin-Manley 83-yard punt return (Mike Meyer kick)	Iowa 17–0
2	10:46	Iowa	Kevonte Martin-Manley 63-yard punt return (Mike Meyer kick)	Iowa 24–0
2	4:57	Western Michigan	Andrew Haldeman 23-yard field goal	Iowa 24–3
2	1:23	Iowa	Mark Weisman 4-yard run (Mike Meyer kick)	Iowa 31–3
2	0:56	Iowa	B.J. Lowery 35-yard interception return (Mike Meyer kick)	Iowa 38–3
3	12:22	Iowa	B.J. Lowery 13-yard interception return (Mike Meyer kick)	Iowa 45–3
3	6:36	Iowa	Damond Powell 29-yard pass from Jake Rudock (Mike Meyer kick)	Iowa 52–3
4	11:40	Iowa	Jordan Canzeri 16-yard run (Marshall Koehn kick)	Iowa 59–3

This ended up being the most lopsided Iowa game in years as the team improved to 3-1 on the season.

=== At Minnesota ===
Iowa at Minnesota
Battle for Floyd of Rosedale

Team	1	2	3	4	Total
• Hawkeyes	3	14	3	3	23
Golden Gophers	0	0	7	0	7

- Date: September 28
- Location: TCF Bank Stadium
  Minneapolis, MN
- Game start: 2:30 p.m. CDT
- Elapsed time: 2:56
- Game attendance: 51,382
- Game weather: 57 °F (14 °C), Overcast, Wind 13 mph (21 km/h) WSW
- Referee: Dave Witvoet
- TV announcers (ABC/ESPN2): Mike Patrick, Ed Cunningham, Jeannine Edwards
- Source: Box Score

Scoring summary
1	6:09	Iowa	Mike Meyer 49-yard field goal	Iowa 3–0
2	8:04	Iowa	Jake Rudock 4-yard run (Mike Meyer kick)	Iowa 10–0
2	2:56	Iowa	Damond Powell 75-yard pass from Jake Rudock (Mike Meyer kick)	Iowa 17–0
3	5:10	Iowa	Mike Meyer 23-yard field goal	Iowa 20–0
3	3:06	Minnesota	Derrick Engel 23-yard pass from Philip Nelson (Chris Hawthorne kick)	Iowa 20–7
4	4:48	Iowa	Mike Meyer 46-yard field goal	Iowa 23–7

After a slow start the Hawkeyes pulled away in a game where the Golden Gophers never had momentum. The victory kept Floyd in Iowa City.

=== Michigan State ===
Michigan State at Iowa

Team	1	2	3	4	Total
• Spartans	0	10	10	6	26
Hawkeyes	0	14	0	0	14

- Date: October 5
- Location: Kinnick Stadium
  Iowa City, Iowa
- Game start: 11:00 a.m. CDT
- Elapsed time: 3:26
- Game attendance: 69,025
- Game weather: 65 °F (18 °C), Scattered Showers, Wind 10 mph (16 km/h) W
- Referee: Dan Capron
- TV announcers (ESPN2): Beth Mowins, Joey Galloway, Paul Carcaterra
- Source: Box Score

Scoring summary
2	11:44	Michigan State	Michael Geiger 27-yard field goal	Michigan State 3–0
2	6:18	Michigan State	Macgarrett Kings Jr. 46-yard pass from Connor Cook (Michael Geiger kick)	Michigan State 10–0
2	4:19	Iowa	Damon Bullock 47-yard pass from Jake Rudock (Mike Meyer kick)	Michigan State 10–7
2	1:10	Iowa	C. J. Fiedorowicz 10-yard pass from Jake Rudock (Mike Meyer kick)	Iowa 14–10
3	11:55	Michigan State	Bennie Fowler 37-yard pass from Connor Cook (Michael Geiger kick)	Michigan State 17–14
3	2:38	Michigan State	Michael Geiger 35-yard field goal	Michigan State 20–14
4	13:28	Michigan State	Michael Geiger 49-yard field goal	Michigan State 23–14
4	5:25	Michigan State	Michael Geiger 40-yard field goal	Michigan State 26–14

=== At Ohio State ===
Iowa at Ohio State

Team	1	2	3	4	Total
Hawkeyes	10	7	7	0	24
• No. 4 Buckeyes	3	7	14	10	34

- Date: October 19
- Location: Ohio Stadium
  Columbus, OH
- Game start: 2:30 p.m. CDT
- Elapsed time: 3:11
- Game weather: 46 °F (8 °C), Cloudy, Wind 13 mph (21 km/h) N
- Referee: Bill LeMonnier
- TV announcers (ABC/ESPN2): Bob Wischusen, Rod Gilmore, Quint Kessenich
- Source: Box Score

Scoring summary
1	9:23	Iowa	C. J. Fiedorowicz 2-yard pass from Jake Rudock (Mike Meyer kick)	Iowa 7–0
1	4:00	Ohio State	Drew Basil 27-yard field goal	Iowa 7–3
1	0:07	Iowa	Mike Meyer 28-yard field goal	Iowa 10–3
2	13:58	Ohio State	Philly Brown 58-yard pass from Braxton Miller (Drew Basil kick)	Tied 10–10
2	7:21	Iowa	Kevonte Martin-Manley 6-yard pass from Jake Rudock (Mike Meyer kick)	Iowa 17–10
3	10:18	Ohio State	Carlos Hyde 1-yard run (Drew Basil kick)	Tied 17–17
3	3:15	Ohio State	Devin Smith 14-yard pass from Braxton Miller (Drew Basil kick)	Ohio State 24–17
3	2:30	Iowa	Jake Duzey 85-yard pass from Jake Rudock (Mike Meyer kick)	Tied 24–24
4	13:24	Ohio State	Carlos Hyde 19-yard run (Drew Basil kick)	Ohio State 31–24
4	5:50	Ohio State	Drew Basil 25-yard field goal	Ohio State 34–24

=== Northwestern ===
Northwestern at Iowa

Team	1	2	3	4	OT	Total
Wildcats	0	0	7	3	0	10
• Hawkeyes	7	3	0	0	7	17

- Date: October 26
- Location: Kinnick Stadium
  Iowa City, Iowa
- Game start: 11:00 p.m. CDT
- Elapsed time: 2:50
- Game attendance: 66,838
- Game weather: 48 °F (9 °C), Mostly Sunny, Wind 17 mph (27 km/h) NW
- Referee: Alex Kemp
- TV announcers (BTN): Matt Devlin, Glen Mason, Jon Jansen
- Source: Box Score

Scoring summary
1	9:22	Iowa	Damon Bullock 3-yard run (Mike Meyer kick)	Iowa 7–0
2	9:56	Iowa	Mike Meyer 38-yard field goal	Iowa 10–0
3	04:44	Northwestern	Dan Vitale 10-yard pass from Kain Colter (Jeff Budzien kick)	Iowa 10–7
4	9:09	Northwestern	Jeff Budzien 29-yard field goal	Tied 10–10
OT	0:00	Iowa	C. J. Fiedorowicz 8-yard pass from Jake Rudock (Mike Meyer kick)	Iowa 17–10

Iowa was able to get the overtime win in this low-scoring affair.

=== Wisconsin ===
Wisconsin at Iowa
Heartland Trophy

Team	1	2	3	4	Total
• No. 22 Badgers	0	7	7	14	28
Hawkeyes	3	3	3	0	9

- Date: November 2
- Location: Kinnick Stadium
  Iowa City, Iowa
- Game start: 11:00 a.m. CDT
- Elapsed time: 3:21
- Game attendance: 69,812
- Game weather: 45 °F (7 °C), Partly Cloudy, Wind 13 mph (21 km/h) NW
- Referee: John O'Neill
- TV announcers (ABC/ESPN2): Sean McDonough, Chris Spielman, Shannon Spake
- Source: Box Score

Scoring summary
1	6:20	Iowa	Mike Meyer 28-yard field goal	Iowa 3–0
2	4:52	Iowa	Mike Meyer 22-yard field goal	Iowa 6–0
2	1:49	Wisconsin	Jacob Pedersen 44-yard pass from Joel Stave (Jack Russell kick)	Wisconsin 7–6
3	7:39	Wisconsin	Jared Abbrederis 20-yard pass from Joel Stave (Jack Russell kick)	Wisconsin 14–6
3	0:30	Iowa	Mike Meyer 29-yard field goal	Wisconsin 14–9
4	3:29	Wisconsin	James White 11-yard run (Jack Russell kick)	Wisconsin 21–9
4	1:35	Wisconsin	James White 2-yard run (Jack Russell kick)	Wisconsin 28–9

=== At Purdue ===
Iowa at Purdue

Team	1	2	3	4	Total
• Hawkeyes	0	14	7	17	38
Boilermakers	0	7	0	7	14

- Date: November 9
- Location: Ross–Ade Stadium
  West Lafayette, IN
- Game start: 11:00 a.m. CST
- Elapsed time: 2:58
- Game attendance: 41,038
- Game weather: 55 °F (13 °C), Sunny, Wind 10 mph (16 km/h) WSW
- Referee: Don Capron
- TV announcers (BTN): Kevin Kugler, Glen Mason, Jon Jansen
- Source: Box Score

Scoring summary
2	11:15	Iowa	Jordan Canzeri 2-yard run (Mike Meyer kick)	Iowa 7–0
2	5:44	Purdue	Kurt Freytag 2-yard pass from Danny Etling (Paul Griggs kick)	Tied 7–7
2	1:57	Iowa	Kevonte Martin-Manley 22-yard pass from Jake Rudock (Mike Meyer kick)	Iowa 14–7
3	3:43	Iowa	Mark Weisman 4-yard run (Mike Meyer kick)	Iowa 21–7
4	11:48	Iowa	Mike Meyer 28-yard field goal	Iowa 24–7
4	6:29	Iowa	Jake Duzey 3-yard pass from Jake Rudock (Mike Meyer kick)	Iowa 31–7
4	2:48	Iowa	C. J. Beathard 5-yard run (Mike Meyer kick)	Iowa 38–7
4	0:51	Purdue	Danny Anthrop 44-yard pass from Austin Appleby (Paul Griggs kick)	Iowa 38–14

Iowa's Jordan Canzeri had his best game yet with 165 yards rushing to lead the Hawkeyes to a Big Ten road victory.

=== Michigan ===
Michigan at Iowa

Team	1	2	3	4	Total
Wolverines	7	14	0	0	21
• Hawkeyes	7	0	7	10	24

- Date: November 23
- Location: Kinnick Stadium
  Iowa City, Iowa
- Game start: 11:00 a.m. CST
- Elapsed time: 3:15
- Game attendance: 65,708
- Game weather: 18 °F (−8 °C), Sunny, Wind 18 mph (29 km/h) NNW
- Referee: Todd Geerlings
- TV announcers (BTN): Kevin Kugler, Glen Mason, Jon Jansen
- Source: Box Score

Scoring summary
1	13:19	Michigan	Brennen Beyer 7-yard interception return (Brendan Gibbons kick)	Michigan 7–0
1	3:39	Iowa	C. J. Fiedorowicz 5-yard pass from Jake Rudock (Mike Meyer kick)	Tied 7–7
2	8:31	Michigan	A. J. Williams 2-yard pass from Devin Gardner (Brendan Gibbons kick)	Michigan 14–7
2	0:41	Michigan	Jeremy Gallon 9-yard pass from Devin Gardner (Brendan Gibbons kick)	Michigan 21–7
3	13:35	Iowa	Tevaun Smith 55-yard pass from Jake Rudock (Mike Meyer kick)	Michigan 21–14
4	12:11	Iowa	Mark Weisman 9-yard run (Mike Meyer kick)	Tied 21–21
4	6:02	Iowa	Mike Meyer 34-yard field goal	Iowa 24–21

Iowa was able to avenge a humbling loss in Ann Arbor from the previous season.

=== At Nebraska ===
Iowa at Nebraska
Heroes Game

Team	1	2	3	4	Total
• Hawkeyes	7	7	10	14	38
Cornhuskers	0	3	7	7	17

- Date: November 29
- Location: Memorial Stadium
  Lincoln, NE
- Game start: 11:00 a.m. CST
- Elapsed time: 3:24
- Game attendance: 91,260
- Game weather: 33 °F (1 °C), Sunny, Wind 15 mph (24 km/h) S
- Referee: Alex Kemp
- TV announcers (ABC): Bob Wischusen, Rod Gilmore, Quint Kessenich
- Source: Box Score

Scoring summary
1	0:16	Iowa	C. J. Fiedorowicz 10-yard pass from Jake Rudock (Mike Meyer kick)	Iowa 7–0
2	5:15	Iowa	Mark Weisman 1-yard run (Mike Meyer kick)	Iowa 14–0
2	0:31	Nebraska	Pat Smith 33-yard field goal	Iowa 14–3
3	10:14	Nebraska	Ameer Abdullah 5-yard run (Pat Smith kick)	Iowa 14–10
3	6:04	Iowa	Mike Meyer 31-yard field goal	Iowa 17–10
3	4:46	Iowa	Kevonte Martin-Manley 24-yard pass from Jake Rudock (Mike Meyer kick)	Iowa 24–10
4	11:25	Nebraska	Quincy Enunwa 15-yard pass from Ron Kellogg III (Pat Smith kick)	Iowa 24–17
4	9:17	Iowa	Mark Weisman 2 Yard run (Mike Meyer kick)	Iowa 31–17
4	3:33	Iowa	C. J. Beathard 4-yard run (Mike Meyer kick)	Iowa 38–17

Iowa won for the first time in the series since 1981 and for the first time in Lincoln since 1943.

=== Vs. LSU (Outback Bowl) ===
Iowa vs. LSU
Outback Bowl

Team	1	2	3	4	Total
Hawkeyes	0	0	7	7	14
• No. 14 Tigers	7	7	0	7	21

- Date: January 1
- Location: Raymond James Stadium
  Tampa, FL
- Game start: 12:00 p.m. CST
- Elapsed time: 3:27
- Game attendance: 51,296
- Game weather: 61 °F (16 °C), Rainy, Wind 9 mph (14 km/h) NNE
- Referee: Greg Burks
- TV announcers (ESPN/ESPN Radio): Mike Tirico, Jon Gruden, Lisa Salters/Carter Blackburn, Danny Kanell, Allison Williams

|Vacated Box Score

Scoring summary
1	10:59	LSU	Anthony Jennings 2-yard run (Colby Delahoussaye kick)	LSU 7-0
2	7:23	LSU	Jeremy Hill 14-yard run (Colby Delahoussaye kick)	LSU 14-0
3	5:52	Iowa	Mark Weisman 2-yard run (Mike Meyer kick)	LSU 14-7
4	2:02	LSU	Jeremy Hill 37-yard run (Colby Delahoussaye kick)	LSU 21-7
4	1:42	Iowa	Kevonte Martin-Manley 4-yard pass from C. J. Beathard (Mike Meyer kick)	LSU 21-14

== Players in the 2014 NFL draft ==
Player	Position	Round	Pick	NFL club	Ref
C. J. Fiedorowicz	Tight end	3	65	Houston Texans	
Christian Kirksey	Outside linebacker	3	71	Cleveland Browns	
Anthony Hitchens	Outside linebacker	4	119	Dallas Cowboys	
