= 2004 Alamo Bowl =

2004 MasterCard Alamo Bowl
Oklahoma State Cowboys	Ohio State Buckeyes
(7–4)	(7–4)
Big 12	Big Ten
7	33
Head coach: Les Miles	Head coach: Jim Tressel
AP / Coaches / BCS; NR / NR / 24	AP / Coaches / BCS; 24 / 22 / 25
	1	2	3	4	Total
Oklahoma State	0	0	0	7	7
Ohio State	13	10	7	3	33
- Date: December 29, 2004
- Season: 2004
- Stadium: Alamodome
- Location: San Antonio, Texas
- Referee: Gerald Wright (WAC)
- Attendance: 65,265

United States TV coverage
- Network: ESPN
- Announcers: Mike Tirico, Lee Corso and Kirk Herbstreit

The 2004 Alamo Bowl featured the Oklahoma State Cowboys and the Ohio State Buckeyes.

Ohio State got on the board first, when quarterback Justin Zwick connected with wide receiver Anthony Gonzalez for a 23-yard touchdown pass, and a 7–0 lead. Mike Nugent connected on field goals of 37 and 35 yards in the first quarter as well, as Ohio State built a 13–0 lead over Oklahoma State.

In the second quarter, running back Lydell Ross rushed for a 1-yard touchdown and a 20–0 lead. He finished the game with 12 carries for 99 yards. Nugent connected on his third field goal of the game, this one from 41 yards out, as Ohio State increased its lead to 23–0 before halftime.

In the third quarter, Ted Ginn Jr. rushed five yards for a touchdown, increasing Ohio State's lead to 30–0. Nugent kicked his final field goal in the fourth quarter, a 37 yarder to give Ohio State a 33–0 lead. Shaun Willis rushed for a 4-yard touchdown at the end of the game, to make the final score 33–7.

Five days after the game, Oklahoma State coach Les Miles left the Cowboys to become the coach of the LSU Tigers, succeeding Nick Saban. Offensive coordinator Mike Gundy was promoted to succeed Miles. Gundy would serve as the Cowboys' head coach until 2025.
