= 2014 Outback Bowl =

- 28th Outback Bowl; LSU's win was vacated by the NCAA in 2023.
Iowa Hawkeyes	LSU Tigers
(8–4)	(9–3)
Big Ten	SEC
14	21
Head coach: Kirk Ferentz	Head coach: Les Miles
	AP / Coaches / BCS; 14 / 14 / 16
	1	2	3	4	Total
Iowa	0	0	7	7	14
LSU	7	7	0	7	21
- Date: January 1, 2014
- Season: 2013
- Stadium: Raymond James Stadium
- Location: Tampa, Florida
- MVP: Jeremy Hill (LSU RB)
- Favorite: LSU by 7.5
- Referee: Greg Burks (Big XII)
- Halftime show: Both schools' bands performed a show; in addition 20 high schools bands from across the nation combined as one giant band
- Attendance: 51,296
- Payout: US$7.2 million per team

United States TV coverage
- Network: ESPN/ESPN Radio
- Announcers: Mike Tirico (Play-by-Play); Jon Gruden (Analyst); Lisa Salters (Sidelines)

The 2014 Outback Bowl was an American college football bowl game that was played on January 1, 2014, at Raymond James Stadium in Tampa, Florida. The 28th edition of the Outback Bowl (which was originally called the Hall of Fame Bowl, and later renamed via sponsorship from Outback Steakhouse), it featured the LSU Tigers from the Southeastern Conference (SEC) and the Iowa Hawkeyes from the Big Ten Conference. It was one of the 2013–14 bowl games that concluded the 2013 FBS football season. The game started at 1:00 p.m. EST and was telecast on ESPN. LSU defeated Iowa by a score of 21–14.

In 2023 this win, along with all other 2013 season LSU wins, was vacated by the NCAA.

== Teams ==
Iowa had won the only previous meeting between the two teams, in the 2005 Capital One Bowl.

=== Iowa ===
Iowa had a record of 8–4 (5–3 Big Ten). Unranked, they finished the season second place in the Big Ten Legends Division.

=== LSU ===
LSU had a regular season record of 9–3 (5–3 SEC). Ranked #16 in the BCS, they finished in third place in the Southeast Conference Western Division.

== Game summary ==
Scoring summary

Quarter	Time	Drive			Team	Scoring information	Score	
Quarter	Time	Plays	Yards	TOP	Team	Scoring information	Iowa	LSU
1	10:59	8	77	4:01	LSU	Anthony Jennings 2-yard touchdown run, Colby Delahoussaye kick good	0	7
2	7:23	7	39	2:52	LSU	Jeremy Hill 14-yard touchdown run, Delahoussaye kick good	0	14
3	5:52	3	1	0:52	IOW	Mark Weisman 2-yard touchdown run, Mike Meyer kick good	7	14
4	2:02	6	92	3:02	LSU	Hill 37-yard touchdown run, Delahoussaye kick good	7	21
4	1:42	2	4	0:20	IOW	Kevonte Martin-Manley 4-yard touchdown reception from C. J. Beathard, Meyer kick good	14	21
"TOP" = time of possession. For other American football terms, see Glossary of American football.							14	21

=== Statistics ===
Statistics	Iowa	LSU
First downs	11	15
Total offense, plays – yards	233	302
Rushes-yards (net)	76	220
Passing yards (net)	157	82
Passes, Comp-Att-Int	13-30-2	7–20–1
Time of Possession	24:14	35:46
