= Les Miles =

American football coach (born 1953)

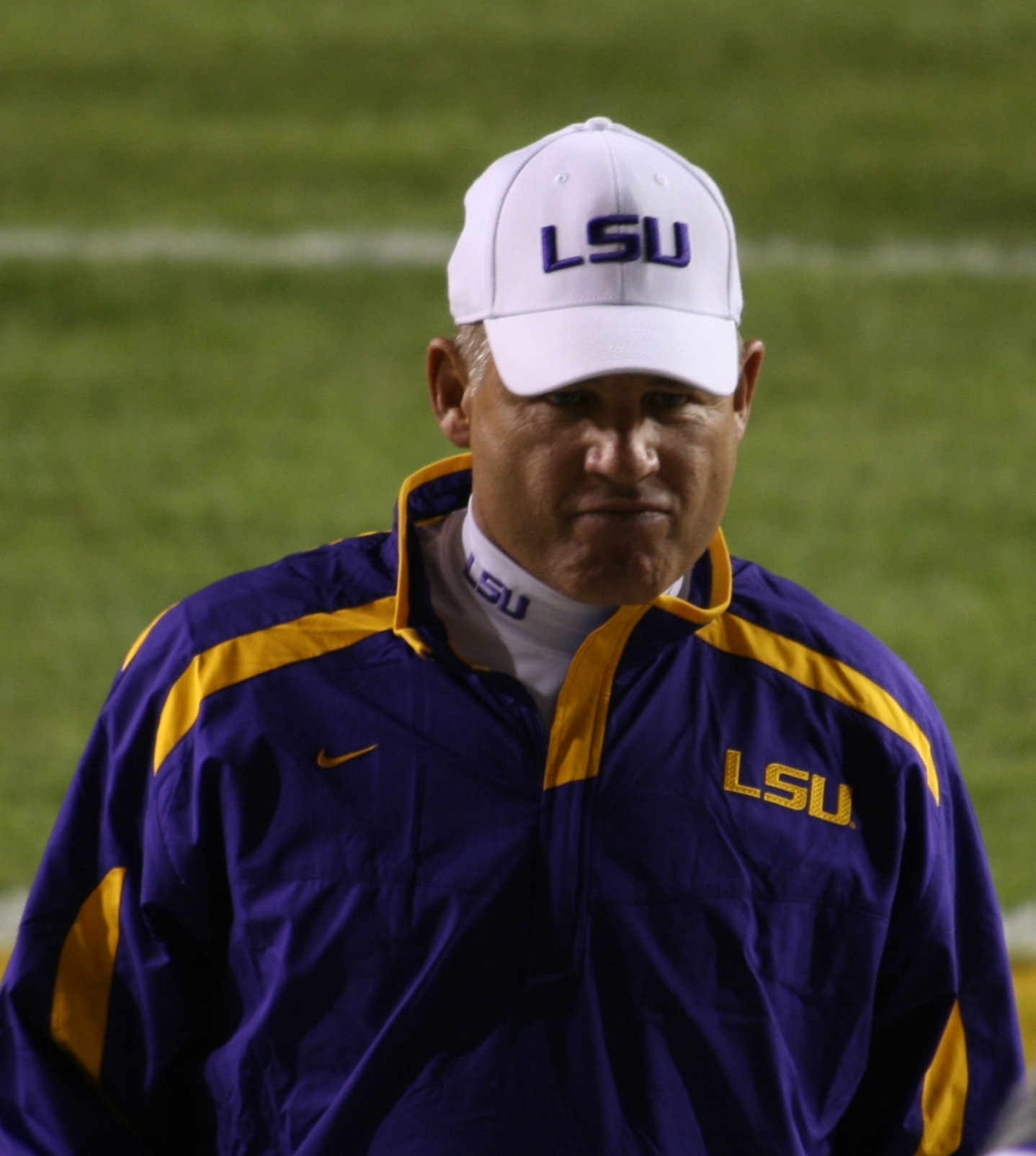
- Miles in 2007

Biographical details
- Born: November 10, 1953 (age 73); Elyria, Ohio, U.S.

Playing career
- 1972–1975: Michigan
- Position: Guard

Coaching career (HC unless noted)
- 1980–1981: Michigan (GA)
- 1982–1986: Colorado (OL)
- 1987–1994: Michigan (OL)
- 1995–1997: Oklahoma State (OC/OL)
- 1998–2000: Dallas Cowboys (TE)
- 2001–2004: Oklahoma State
- 2005–2016: LSU
- 2019–2020: Kansas

Head coaching record
- Overall: 108–73 (Note: Miles' 37 wins at LSU between 2012 and 2015 were vacated by the National Collegiate Athletic Association (NCAA) on June 22, 2023, after a former player was ruled ineligible. The 37 wins included 20 conference wins and two bowl game victories. Miles' career head coaching record was reduced from 145–73 to 108–73 and his record in bowl games from 8–6 to 6–6. His record at LSU fell from 114–34 overall and 62–28 in conference play to 77–34 and 42–28, respectively.)
- Bowls: 6–6

Accomplishments and honors

Championships
- National (2007, 2011); 2 SEC (2007, 2011); 3 SEC West Division (2005, 2007, 2011)

Awards
- Liberty Mutual Coach of the Year Award (2011); Home Depot Coach of the Year Award (2011); Associated Press College Football Coach of the Year Award (2011); AFCA FBS Coach of the Year (2011); Walter Camp Coach of the Year (2011)

Leslie Edwin Miles (born November 10, 1953) is an American former football coach. He most recently served as the head coach at Kansas. His head coaching career began with the Oklahoma State Cowboys, where he coached from 2001 to 2004. Following that, he coached LSU from 2005 to 2016. Miles is nicknamed "the Hat" for his signature white cap, as well as "the Mad Hatter" for his eccentricities and play-calling habits. Prior to being a head coach, he was an assistant coach at Oklahoma State as well as at the Michigan Wolverines, the Colorado Buffaloes, and with the Dallas Cowboys of the National Football League (NFL). Miles led the 2007 LSU Tigers football team to a win in the BCS National Championship Game, defeating Ohio State.

== Early life, playing career ==
Miles was born to Bubba, a long-haul trucking broker, and Martha Miles. He earned all-state honors as a lineman in football as well as letters in baseball and wrestling at Elyria High School in Ohio, graduating in 1972. He attended the University of Michigan from 1972 to 1975, playing for the football team under head coach Bo Schembechler, earning letters in 1974 and 1975.

== Coaching career ==
=== Early jobs ===
In 1980, Miles joined Bo Schembechler's staff at Michigan as a graduate assistant. He left Michigan in 1982 to coach offensive line at the University of Colorado, where fellow Michigan assistant Bill McCartney had just been named head coach.

In 1987, Miles returned to Michigan, which was still being coached by Schembechler, as the offensive line coach. When Schembechler retired in 1990, Miles continued as offensive line coach under new head coach Gary Moeller. While Miles was a coaching assistant at Michigan, the Wolverines had eight consecutive winning seasons and bowl appearances, including four Rose Bowl appearances. In 1995, Moeller was forced to resign for non-football related reasons. At the same time, Miles had a rift with the University of Michigan, forcing him to seek employment elsewhere. Miles then accepted a promotion to offensive coordinator on former Colorado assistant Bob Simmons's staff at Oklahoma State. During the 1998 through 2000 seasons he was the tight ends coach for the NFL's Dallas Cowboys under head coaches Chan Gailey (1998–99) and Dave Campo (2000).

=== Oklahoma State ===
Miles returned to Oklahoma State in 2001 as the head coach. In the three years prior to Miles' arrival in Stillwater, the Cowboys finished 5–6, 5–6, and 3–8. Oklahoma State posted another losing record (4–7) in Miles's first season at the helm, but subsequently achieved winning records during each of the following three seasons – 8–5, 9–4, and 7–5, respectively. His last three seasons at Oklahoma State ended in invitations to the Houston, Cotton, and Alamo Bowls, respectively.

During the last game of Miles's first season as head coach, Oklahoma State faced #4 Oklahoma. Despite the fact that Oklahoma State was facing Oklahoma on the road, Miles led his team to a 16–13 upset victory over the Sooners.

During Miles's second season, Oklahoma State again ended the regular season with a game against #3 Oklahoma. Yet again, Miles led his team to a 38–28 upset victory over the Sooners. As a result of his team's performance during his second year, Miles was named the Big 12 Conference Coach of the Year by the Associated Press in 2002.

=== LSU ===
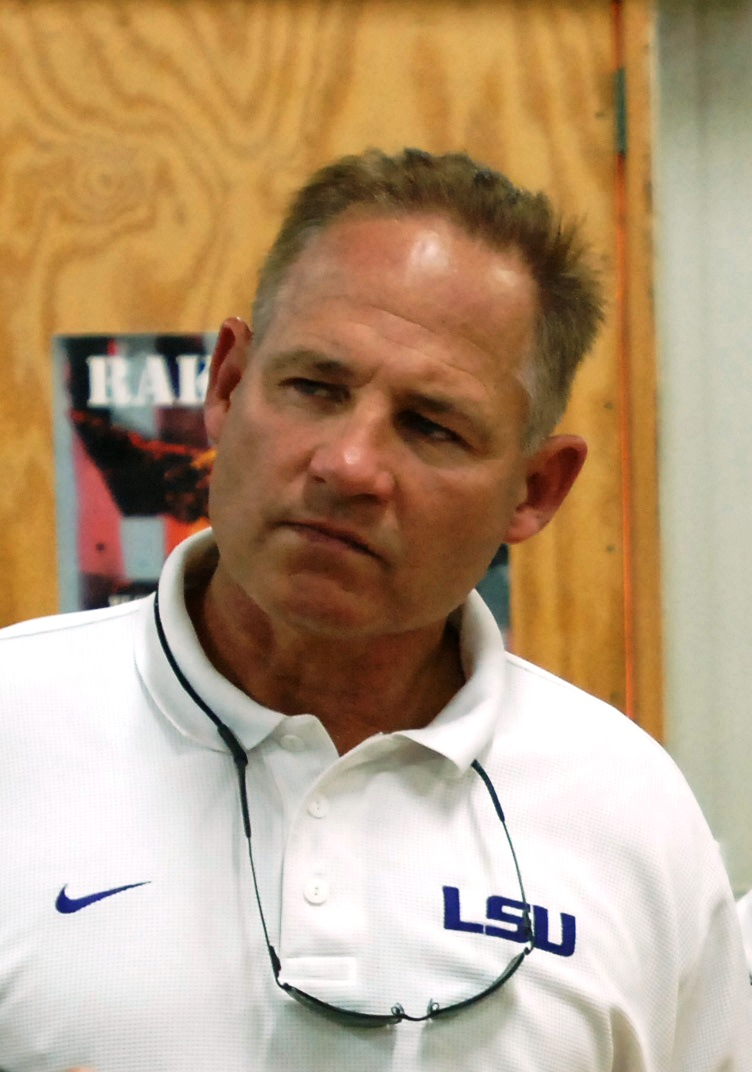
Miles during his tenure at LSU.

On January 2, 2005, Miles was named as the 32nd head football coach of Louisiana State University (LSU). In August 2005, days before Miles was to make his debut as the coach of LSU, Hurricane Katrina struck southern Louisiana. LSU's first game, a home game against North Texas, was postponed until later in the season. The Tigers second game, which was against Arizona State, was moved from Baton Rouge to Tempe because the LSU campus was still serving as an emergency center for Hurricane Katrina relief. The conference opener against the University of Tennessee was also delayed, this time because of Hurricane Rita.

In his first season as head coach, LSU won the 2005 SEC Western Division title with a 10–1 regular season record – including wins over #15 Arizona State on September 10, #11 Florida on October 15, #16 Auburn on October 22, and #4 Alabama on November 12. LSU's only regular season loss was an upset at home to #10 Tennessee on September 26. In the Tennessee game, after building a 21–0 lead at halftime, the Tigers failed to score another touchdown and lost to Tennessee by a score of 30–27 in overtime. In the SEC Championship Game in Atlanta, the #3 LSU Tigers, though favored, lost to #13 Georgia 34–14. LSU recovered to win the 2005 Peach Bowl with a 40–3 rout of the #9 Miami Hurricanes. Miles finished his first season at LSU with an 11–2 record, a #6 ranking in the USA Today Coaches Poll, and a #5 ranking in the AP Poll.

In 2006, LSU finished the regular season a 10–2 record, and ended the season with six straight victories. The 2006 season marked the first time in LSU history that the Tigers finished with back-to-back 10-win seasons. Miles was able to do this in spite of his team playing its four toughest games on the road. All four games were against teams ranked in the top eight when the game took place, with three of the teams in the top five (Auburn, Florida, Arkansas). LSU split those four games, losing to Auburn and Florida, but defeating Tennessee and Arkansas. LSU did not win the SEC West title, finishing one game behind Arkansas. However, the Tigers were ranked ahead of Arkansas at the end of the regular season, and were rewarded with an invitation to face Notre Dame in the Sugar Bowl, where they defeated the Irish by a score of 41–14. LSU finished the 2006 season ranked #3 overall in both the AP and ESPN polls.

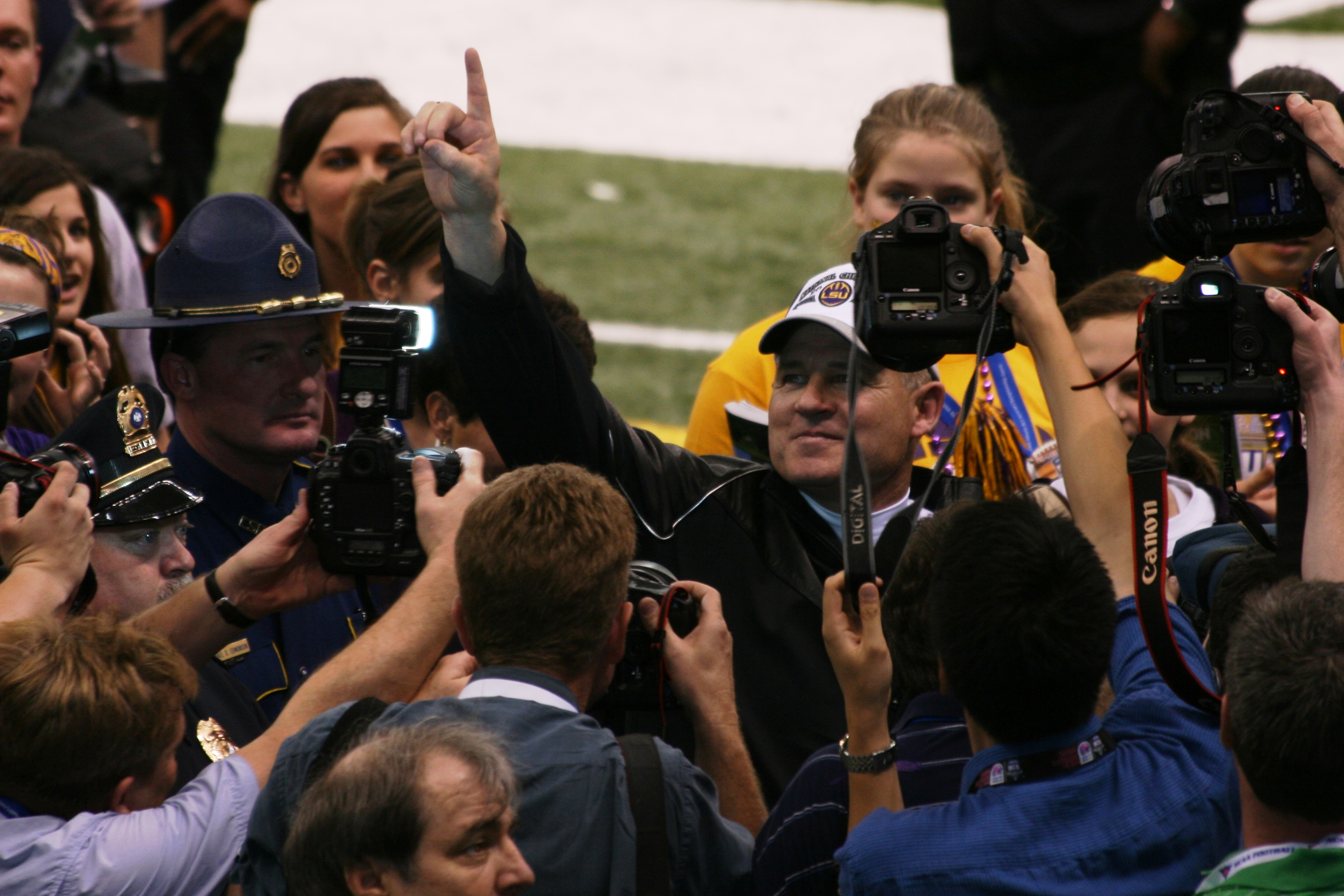
Miles celebrates his team's victory in the 2008 BCS National Championship Game.

In 2007, Miles gained national attention due to numerous unconventional play calls during nationally televised games. LSU was ranked #1 twice during the regular season, but lost at #17 Kentucky in triple overtime by a score of 43–37 before losing its final regular season game at home to unranked Arkansas 50–48, also in triple overtime. As of the end of the 2007 regular season, which featured victories over six different coaches with national championships, Miles's record as head coach at LSU was 34–6. Coincidentally, the 2007 regular season also ended with a loss to Arkansas in a game marked by several of Miles' hallmark unconventional calls. Despite the loss, LSU would go on to the SEC Championship. On the day of the game, Kirk Herbstreit wrongly reported on ESPN's College GameDay that Les Miles had accepted an offer to succeed Lloyd Carr as the head coach at Michigan. Despite the media distractions, LSU won the 2007 SEC title, beating Tennessee 21–14. The night of LSU's SEC title victory, the teams then ranked #1 (Missouri) and #2 (West Virginia) both lost, allowing LSU to be ranked #2 in the AP, Coaches, Harris, and BCS polls. LSU beat Ohio State in the BCS National Championship Game 38–24, giving Miles his first national championship and LSU its third overall.

Throughout the 2007 season, there was speculation that Miles would be a top candidate for the University of Michigan head coaching position if it became available. On the day of the SEC championship game, Kirk Herbstreit incorrectly reported on ESPN's College GameDay that Miles had accepted an offer to succeed Lloyd Carr as the head coach at the University of Michigan. LSU officials quickly responded to Herbstreit's announcement and confirmed that Les Miles would not be taking the Michigan position and would be staying at LSU. Miles cleared up any confusion himself in a last minute press conference to reporters saying,

"There was some misinformation on ESPN and I think it's imperative that I straighten it out. I am the head coach at LSU. I will be the head coach at LSU. I have no interest in talking to anybody else. I've got a championship game to play, and I am excited about the opportunity of my damn strong football team to play in it. That's really all I'd like to say. It was unfortunate that I had to address my team with this information this morning. With that being done, I think we'd be ready to play. There will be no questions for me. I represent me in this issue. Please ask me after. I'm busy. Thank you very much. Have a great day."

The speculation resurfaced two weeks later when The Detroit Free Press reported that Michigan athletic director Bill Martin and university president Mary Sue Coleman spoke with Miles directly over the phone a few days after he signed a contract extension with LSU. In response to the report, Miles issued a statement acknowledging the conversation, but claimed that he was merely offering advice and assistance to Martin on Michigan's search and that he is not a candidate for the vacancy. Miles reaffirmed his commitment to stay at LSU, declaring "I'm going to be the coach at LSU next season." Any remaining speculation that Miles would still consider the job ended on December 16, 2007, when West Virginia coach Rich Rodriguez accepted the head coaching job at Michigan. Miles followed up the national championship with and 8–5 season in 2008 and a 9–4 season in 2009.

Miles was again mentioned as a candidate for the head job when Rodriguez was fired after the 2010 season. Michigan athletic director Dave Brandon, who was a teammate of Miles at Michigan, reportedly flew to Baton Rouge to meet with Miles after LSU defeated Texas A&M in the 2011 Cotton Bowl Classic. An LSU spokesman confirmed that Miles was meeting with Michigan officials to discuss the vacancy, though Miles declined to identify whom he had met with or reveal the substance of the discussions. Though some sources indicated that Miles would accept the Michigan job if it were offered to him and Baton Rouge radio station WJBO reported that Miles had already accepted the position, Miles again ultimately decided to stay at LSU. The 2010 season as a whole was successful for Miles and LSU with the team finishing 11–2 and winning the Cotton Bowl.

The 2011 season marked great opportunity that faded out for Miles and LSU. The Tigers went 13–0, including a hard-fought 9–6 overtime duel with Alabama in a Game of the Century, and won the SEC Championship over Georgia. LSU qualified for the National Championship, where they faced off against Alabama in a rematch. The Crimson Tide defeated the Tigers 21–0 in the National Championship.

The Tigers responded positively following the 2011 season with consecutive 10–3 campaigns in 2012 and 2013. The Tigers took a step back in the 2014 season with an 8–5 record.

Having lost three straight games after a 7–0 start into the 2015 season, rumors were floating that LSU would buy-out Miles' contract after the season. After a season-ending victory over Texas A&M, the athletic department announced they would retain Miles as head coach. On September 25, 2016, LSU fired Miles and offensive coordinator Cam Cameron after an 18–13 loss to Auburn the previous day and a 2–2 start to begin the season. Defensive line coach Ed Orgeron was named interim coach for the rest of the season. Miles left LSU as the second-winningest coach in school history, behind only Charlie McClendon.

=== Kansas ===
On November 18, 2018, Miles was hired as head coach at the University of Kansas. He signed a five-year, $13.8 million contract. In his first year as coach, the Jayhawks finished 3–9 overall and 1–8 in the Big 12. They defeated Boston College on the road to earn their first win on the road against a Power Five Conference team in 48 games. Miles and athletic director Jeff Long had been friends since the 1980s, dating to their days at Michigan when Miles was an assistant and Long was an assistant athletic director. In the COVID-19 pandemic shortened season of 2020, Miles went 0–9, which marked the third time in school history the Jayhawks went winless.

Miles was placed on administrative leave on March 5, 2021, due to an investigation of inappropriate conduct with female students while at LSU. On March 8, Miles and Kansas mutually agreed to part ways in the wake of the misconduct allegations. USA Today's Dan Wolken wrote that the decision to place Miles on administrative leave was "merely a placeholder" until lawyers could decide whether his ouster would be deemed a mutual agreement to part ways or a firing. Along similar lines, Yahoo! Sports' Pete Thamel said the manner of his departure was "just semantics."

Kansas and Miles settled for a $1.99 million buyout of the $8 million left in his contract at the time he was forced out, plus his monthly salary for March 2021. At a press conference the following day, Long said that Miles had assured him that there was nothing in his past "that could potentially embarrass the university or himself or our program." Long added that in February, he and other school officials had been alerted about "a legal dispute in Louisiana," but Miles had again assured him there was nothing to worry about. He claimed to have only learned about the allegations from the media. While Long was "beyond disappointed" that he had been forced to push Miles out, he believed it was "the right decision" under the circumstances." Long would be forced out himself later that day.

A July 2021 article in The Kansas City Star alleged that when a football player alleged threats and harassment from other teammates in March 2019, the football program paid the player to leave campus and take classes online from his home out-of-state. The article also alleges Miles suggested the players settle their dispute "on the practice field, pitting them against each other—head-on—in full-contact drills."

=== Controversies ===
In September 2013, Sports Illustrated published a series of articles as part of an investigation of his tenure at Oklahoma State from 2001 to 2005. The series alleged Oklahoma State used a bonus system for players, orchestrated by then-assistant coach Joe DeForest, along with direct payments and no-show or sham jobs involving boosters. Miles was accused of dismissing academic standards to the point of players playing who were otherwise academically ineligible, including having their school work done by tutors and other school personnel. Rumors also alleged that the staff tolerated widespread drug abuse among the players by using a sham drug counseling program and selective drug enforcement. No evidence linked Miles to any wrongdoing during his time as head coach at OSU and he denied the allegations. Sports Illustrated was later criticized, by one Deadspin author, for its lack of substantive evidence outside of interviews with disgruntled former players. The Deadspin author went on to further say that "SI had interviewed more than 60 former players and approximately a dozen former assistant coaches and staffers".

In 2013, LSU requested that the law firm Taylor Porter conduct an investigation into Miles's relationships with female students after a number of accusations. The investigation determined that his behavior was inappropriate, although it did not find that he had sexual relationships with any of the women. As a result of the investigation, LSU issued a letter of reprimand to Miles, forbade him from hiring student employees to babysit, and prohibited him from being alone with students.

On June 22, 2023, the National Collegiate Athletic Association (NCAA) announced that LSU would vacate 37 wins during Miles' tenure, from 2012 to 2015, as punishment stemming from a scandal involving former All-SEC offensive lineman Vadal Alexander. Alexander's father received over $180,000 in funds from an LSU booster that was found to have been embezzled from a children's hospital in Baton Rouge, with Alexander retroactively ruled ineligible. As a result of the vacated wins, Miles' career head coaching record was reduced from 145–73 (.665) to 108–73 (.597), which dropped him below the .600 threshold of eligibility for the College Football Hall of Fame. In 2024, Miles, in response to the vacated wins, filed suit in the United States District Court for the Middle District of Louisiana against LSU, the NCAA, and the National Football Foundation (NFF), which oversees the College Football Hall of Fame.

== Personal life ==
Miles is married, with four children. ESPN has “positively” cited him for the balance he maintains between his role as a head football coach and his role as husband and father. He is involved in churches with his family and has described himself as a "strong Christian." In 2018, Miles was featured in Dos Equis's campaign "Keep It Interesante", showcasing Miles's affinity for playing-field grass. His sons Manny and Ben played for him at Kansas.

== Head coaching record ==
| Year | Team | Overall | Conference | Standing | Bowl/playoffs | Coaches^{#} | AP^{°} |
|---|---|---|---|---|---|---|---|
Oklahoma State Cowboys (Big 12 Conference) (2001–2004)
| 2001 | Oklahoma State | 4–7 | 2–6 | 5th South | | | |
| 2002 | Oklahoma State | 8–5 | 5–3 | T–3rd South | W Houston | | |
| 2003 | Oklahoma State | 9–4 | 5–3 | 3rd South | L Cotton | | |
| 2004 | Oklahoma State | 7–5 | 4–4 | 5th South | L Alamo | | |
| Oklahoma State: | | 28–21 | 16–16 | | | | |
LSU Tigers (Southeastern Conference) (2005–2016)
| 2005 | LSU | 11–2 | 7–1 | T–1st Western | W Peach | 5 | 6 |
| 2006 | LSU | 11–2 | 6–2 | T–2nd Western | W Sugar^{†} | 3 | 3 |
| 2007 | LSU | 12–2 | 6–2 | 1st Western | W BCS NCG^{†} | 1 | 1 |
| 2008 | LSU | 8–5 | 3–5 | 3rd Western | W Chick-fil-A | | |
| 2009 | LSU | 9–4 | 5–3 | 2nd Western | L Capital One | 17 | 17 |
| 2010 | LSU | 11–2 | 6–2 | T–2nd Western | W Cotton | 8 | 8 |
| 2011 | LSU | 13–1 | 8–0 | 1st Western | L BCS NCG^{†} | 2 | 2 |
| 2012 | LSU | 0–3 | 0–2 | T–2nd Western | L Chick-fil-A | 12 | 13 |
| 2013 | LSU | 0–3 | 0–3 | 3rd Western | V Outback | 14 | 14 |
| 2014 | LSU | 0–5 | 0–4 | T–4th Western | L Music City | | |
| 2015 | LSU | 0–3 | 0–3 | T–3rd Western | V Texas | 17 | 16 |
| 2016 | LSU | 2–2 (Note: Miles was fired after the first four games of the 2016 season. Ed Orgeron served as interim head coach for the remainder of the regular season and was promoted to head coach on a permanent basis on November 26. LSU finished the year with an overall record of 8–4 and a mark of 5–3 in conference play, tying for second place in the Western Division of the Southeastern Conference (SEC). The Tigers defeated Louisville in the Citrus Bowl as were ranked No. 14 in the Coaches Poll and No. 13 in the AP Poll at the end of the season.) | 1–1 | | | | |
| LSU: | | 77–34 | 42–28 | | | | |
Kansas Jayhawks (Big 12 Conference) (2019–2020)
| 2019 | Kansas | 3–9 | 1–8 | 10th | | | |
| 2020 | Kansas | 0–9 | 0–8 | 10th | | | |
| Kansas: | | 3–18 | 1–16 | | | | |
| Total: | | 108–73 | | | | | |
National championship Conference title Conference division title or championship game berth
^{†}Indicates BCS bowl.; ^{#}Rankings from final Coaches Poll.; ^{°}Rankings from final AP Poll.
