= Conor Boffeli =

American football player (born 1991)

No. 59
- Position: Offensive guard

Personal information
- Born: August 29, 1991 (age 35); West Des Moines, Iowa, U.S.
- Listed height: 6 ft 4 in (1.93 m)
- Listed weight: 304 lb (138 kg)

Career information
- College: Iowa
- NFL draft: 2014: undrafted

Career history
- Minnesota Vikings (2014)*; Houston Texans (2014)*; Chicago Bears (2014−2015)*; Cleveland Browns (2015–2016)*
- * Offseason or practice squad member only
- Stats at Pro Football Reference

Conor Boffeli (born August 29, 1991) is an American former professional football guard. He played college football for the Iowa Hawkeyes. Boffeli played in the National Football League (NFL) for the Minnesota Vikings, Houston Texans, Chicago Bears, and Cleveland Browns.

== Early life ==
Boffeli attended Valley High School in West Des Moines, Iowa. He was a Class 4A second-team All-State selection as a senior, three time All-Conference pick. For his career he had 31 catches for 402 yards and 2 touchdowns as a Tight End. He was also a letterman in basketball and baseball.

== College career ==
Boffeli redshirted his first year in 2009. In 2010 was listed as third-team Center, and saw limited play time in 2011. He started the final 3 games of the 2012 season at Left Guard. In 2013, he started all 13 games at Left Guard, where he received Honorable Mention All-Big Ten and Academic All-Big Ten.

== Professional career ==
Pre-draft measurables
Height	Weight	40-yard dash	20-yard shuttle	Three-cone drill	Vertical jump	Broad jump	Bench press
6 ft 4 in (1.93 m)	298 lb (135 kg)	5.30 s	4.61 s	7.44 s	25 in (0.64 m)	8 ft 5 in (2.57 m)	21 reps
All values from NFL Combine.

=== Minnesota Vikings ===
Boffeli was signed by the Minnesota Vikings as an undrafted free agent on May 10, 2014. He was released by the Vikings on May 19, 2014.

=== Houston Texans ===
The Houston Texans signed Boffeli on May 19, 2014. The Texans released Boffeli on August 26, 2014.

=== Chicago Bears ===
The Chicago Bears signed Boffeli on October 2, 2014, to the practice squad. On September 5, 2015, he was released by the Bears.

=== Cleveland Browns ===
The Cleveland Browns signed Boffeli to a reserve-future contract on January 7, 2016. On August 1, 2016, Boffeli was waived by the Browns.
