= List of Ohio State Buckeyes football seasons =

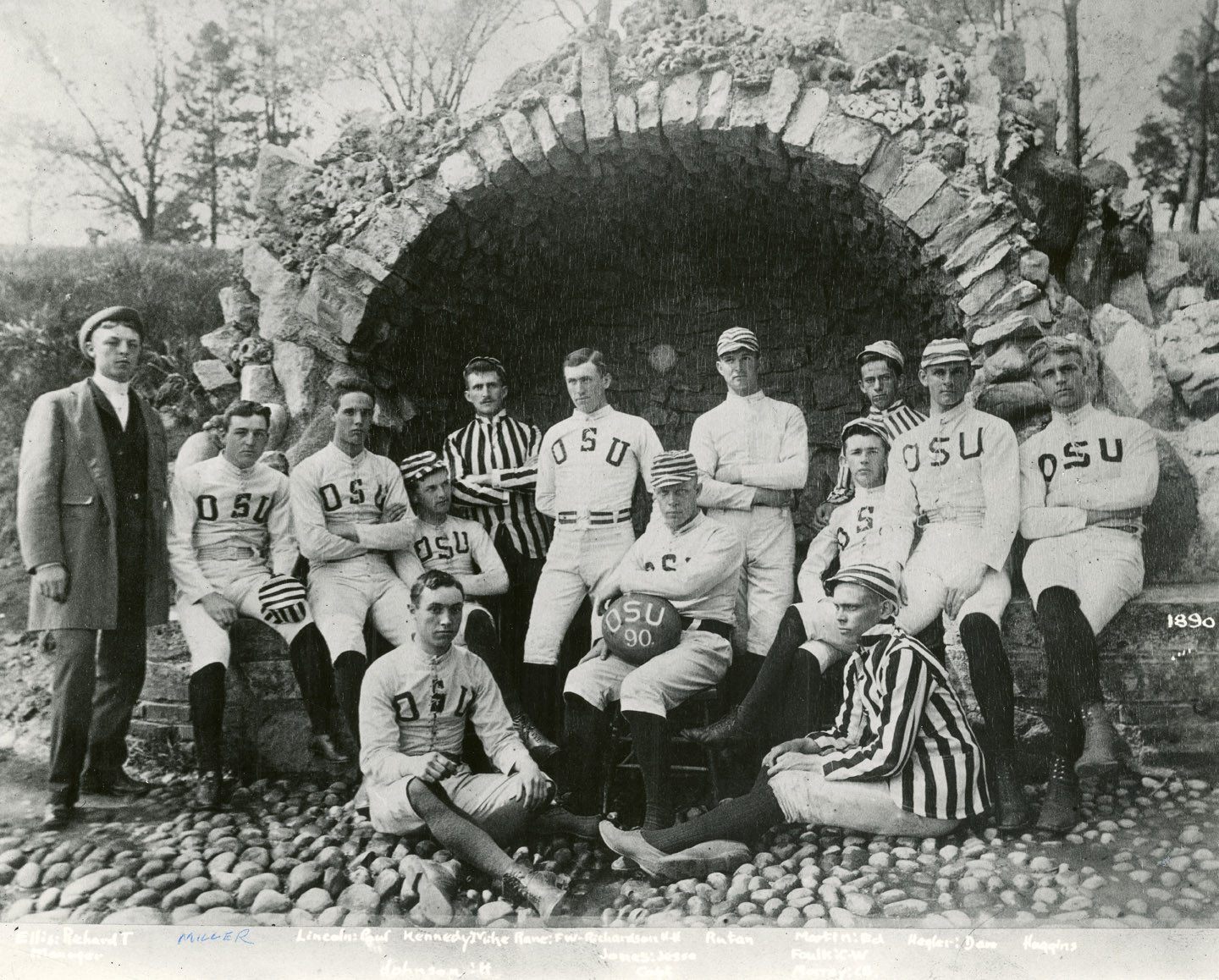
The first football team representing the Ohio State University in 1890

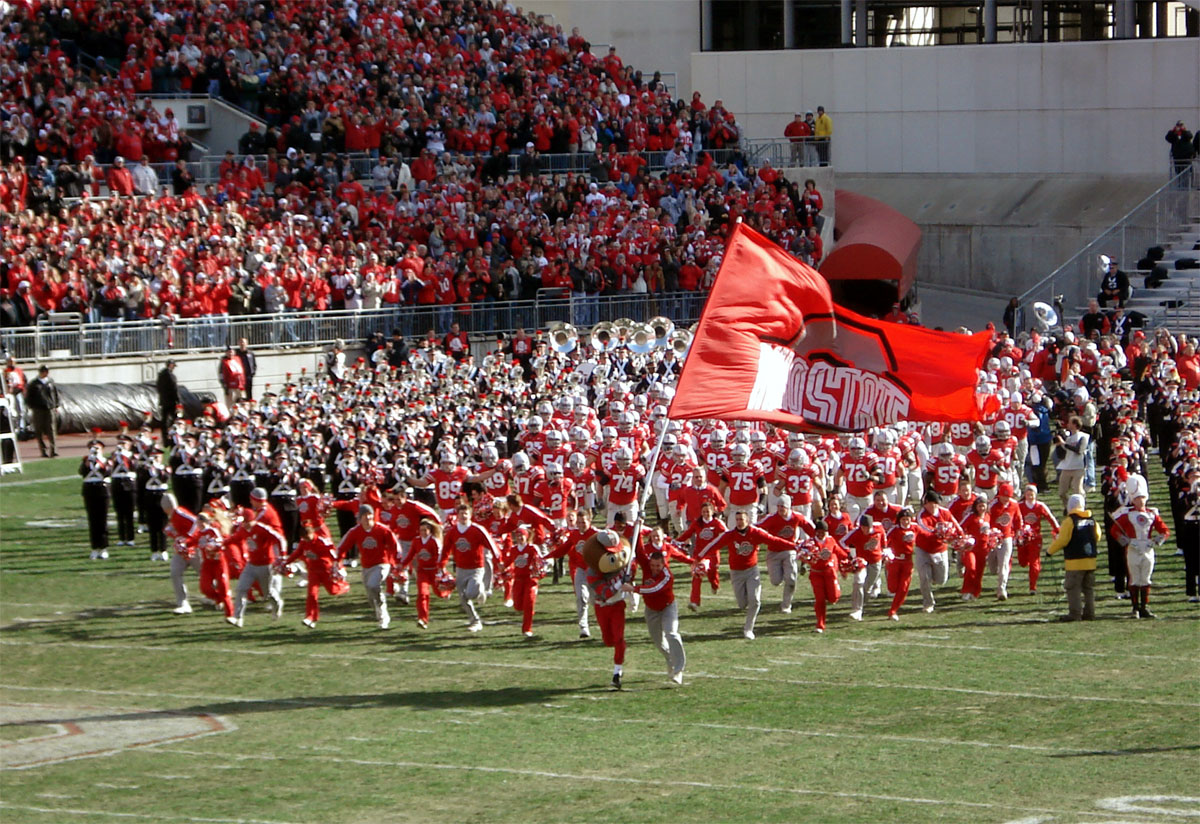
The Buckeyes take to the field for a game during the 2006 season

The Ohio State Buckeyes college football team competes as part of the National Collegiate Athletic Association (NCAA) Division I Football Bowl Subdivision, representing the Ohio State University in the East Division of the Big Ten Conference. Ohio State has played their home games at Ohio Stadium in Columbus, Ohio since 1922.

The Buckeyes claim nine national championships along with 39 conference championships and ten undefeated seasons (six perfect seasons). Ohio State is second among all Big Ten programs in terms of conference championships (39) and has an overall record of 468–171–24 in conference play. With 946 wins in over 130 seasons of football, Ohio State ranks second among all programs in terms of total wins and is first all-time in winning percentage in the NCAA.

Ohio State students had first formed a football team in 1886 but they received additional guidance in the rules of modern gridiron football in 1887 from Joseph Frederick Firestone, a Columbus, Ohio resident who had previously played football at the Stevens Institute of Technology. The Ohio State football team first played in competitive competition on May 3, 1890, against Ohio Wesleyan University. Ohio State was a football independent from 1890 to 1901 before joining the Ohio Athletic Conference (OAC) as a charter member in 1902. The Buckeyes won two conference championships while members of the OAC and in 1913 became members of the Big Ten Conference. The school saw its first real success in football and in the Big Ten under head coach John Wilce, who spent sixteen years at the university and won three conference championships, with a Rose Bowl appearance in 1921. Ohio State won two more Big Ten titles under head coach Francis Schmidt and won their first national championship in 1942 under head coach Paul Brown.

Following World War II, Ohio State saw sparse success on the football field with three separate coaches and in 1951 hired Woody Hayes to coach the team. Under his guidance Ohio State won thirteen Big Ten championships and national championships in 1954, 1957, 1961, 1968 and 1970. During his tenure Ohio State appeared in the Rose Bowl eight times, with the Buckeyes winning four of them. Following Hayes' dismissal in 1978, Earle Bruce became the head coach, leading the Buckeyes to a conference championship and a Rose Bowl appearance in his first season. Bruce coached for the Buckeyes from 1979 to 1987 and was replaced in 1988 by John Cooper. Under Cooper and Bruce the Buckeyes won seven conference championships. Jim Tressel was hired as head coach in 2001 and quickly gave Ohio State its seventh national championship in 2002 with a win in the Fiesta Bowl. Ohio State won seven Big Ten championships under Tressel and appeared in eight Bowl Championship Series games, winning five of them.

In his debut as head coach, Urban Meyer led the program to an undefeated 2012 season, and two years later to their eighth national championship in the 2014 season. Through the 2024 season, Ohio State has compiled an official overall record of 978 wins, 336 losses and 53 ties, and has appeared in 59 bowl games, with the most recent being the 2025 College Football Playoff National Championship.

Ohio State is the only program in college football history to have never lost more than seven games in a single season.

== Seasons ==
Year	Coach	Overall	Conference	Standing	Bowl/playoffs	Coaches^{#}	AP^{°}
Alexander S. Lilley (Independent) (1890–1891)
1890	Alexander S. Lilley	1–3					
1891	Alexander S. Lilley	2–3					
Jack Ryder (Independent) (1892–1895)
1892	Jack Ryder	5–3					
1893	Jack Ryder	4–5					
1894	Jack Ryder	6–5					
1895	Jack Ryder	4–4–2					
Charles A. Hickey (Independent) (1896)
1896	Charles A. Hickey	5–5–1					
David F. Edwards (Independent) (1897)
1897	David F. Edwards	1–7–1					
Jack Ryder (Independent) (1898)
1898	Jack Ryder	3–5					
John B. Eckstorm (Independent) (1899–1901)
1899	John B. Eckstorm	9–0–1					
1900	John B. Eckstorm	8–1–1					
1901	John B. Eckstorm	5–3–1					
Perry Hale (Ohio Athletic Conference) (1902–1903)
1902	Perry Hale	6–2–2	2–1	2nd			
1903	Perry Hale	8–3	3–1	2nd			
Edwin Sweetland (Ohio Athletic Conference) (1904–1905)
1904	Edwin Sweetland	6–5	2–1	2nd			
1905	Edwin Sweetland	8–2–2	2–0–1	2nd			
Albert E. Herrnstein (Ohio Athletic Conference) (1906–1909)
1906	Albert E. Herrnstein	8–1	3–0	1st			
1907	Albert E. Herrnstein	7–2–1	5–1–1	2nd			
1908	Albert E. Herrnstein	6–4	4–3	3rd			
1909	Albert E. Herrnstein	7–3	5–2	3rd			
Howard Jones (Ohio Athletic Conference) (1910)
1910	Howard Jones	6–1–3	5–1–2	T–3rd			
Harry Vaughan (Ohio Athletic Conference) (1911)
1911	Harry Vaughan	5–3–2	4–1–2	4th			
John R. Richards (Ohio Athletic Conference) (1912)
1912	John R. Richards	6–3	5–0	1st			
John Wilce (Western Conference) (1913–1928)
1913	John Wilce	4–2–1	1–2	T–7th			
1914	John Wilce	5–2	2–2	T–4th			
1915	John Wilce	5–1–1	2–1–1	4th			
1916	John Wilce	7–0	4–0	1st			
1917	John Wilce	8–0–1	4–0	1st			
1918	John Wilce	3–3	0–3	9th			
1919	John Wilce	6–1	3–1	2nd			
1920	John Wilce	7–1	5–0	1st	L Rose		
1921	John Wilce	5–2	4–1	T–2nd			
1922	John Wilce	3–4	1–4	8th			
1923	John Wilce	3–4–1	1–4	T–8th			
1924	John Wilce	2–3–3	1–3–2	7th			
1925	John Wilce	4–3–1	1–3–1	8th			
1926	John Wilce	7–1	3–1	3rd			
1927	John Wilce	4–4	2–3	T–6th			
1928	John Wilce	5–2–1	3–2	T–4th			
Sam Willaman (Big Ten Conference) (1929–1933)
1929	Sam Willaman	4–3–1	2–2–1	T–5th			
1930	Sam Willaman	5–2–1	2–2–1	T–4th			
1931	Sam Willaman	6–3	4–2	4th			
1932	Sam Willaman	4–1–3	2–1–2	4th			
1933	Sam Willaman	7–1	4–1	2nd			
Francis Schmidt (Big Ten Conference) (1934–1940)
1934	Francis Schmidt	7–1	5–1	2nd			
1935	Francis Schmidt	7–1	5–0	T–1st			
1936	Francis Schmidt	5–3	4–1	T–2nd			
1937	Francis Schmidt	6–2	5–1	2nd			13
1938	Francis Schmidt	4–3–1	2–3–1	6th			
1939	Francis Schmidt	6–2	5–1	1st			15
1940	Francis Schmidt	4–4	3–3	T–4th			
Paul Brown (Big Ten Conference) (1941–1943)
1941	Paul Brown	6–1–1	3–1–1	T–2nd			13
1942	Paul Brown	9–1	5–1	1st			1
1943	Paul Brown	3–6	1–4	7th			
Carroll Widdoes (Big Ten Conference) (1944–1945)
1944	Carroll Widdoes	9–0	6–0	1st			2
1945	Carroll Widdoes	7–2	5–2	3rd			12
Paul Bixler (Big Ten Conference) (1946)
1946	Paul Bixler	4–3–2	2–3–1	T–6th			
Wes Fesler (Big Ten Conference) (1947–1950)
1947	Wes Fesler	2–6–1	1–4–1	9th			
1948	Wes Fesler	6–3	3–3	4th			
1949	Wes Fesler	7–1–2	4–1–1	T–1st	W Rose		6
1950	Wes Fesler	6–3	5–2	T–2nd		10	14
Woody Hayes (Big Ten Conference) (1951–1978)
1951	Woody Hayes	4–3–2	2–3–2	5th			
1952	Woody Hayes	6–3	5–2	3rd		15	17
1953	Woody Hayes	6–3	4–3	4th		20	
1954	Woody Hayes	10–0	7–0	1st	W Rose	2	1
1955	Woody Hayes	7–2	6–0	1st		5	5
1956	Woody Hayes	6–3	4–2	T–4th			15
1957	Woody Hayes	9–1	7–0	1st	W Rose	1	2
1958	Woody Hayes	6–1–2	4–1–2	3rd		7	8
1959	Woody Hayes	3–5–1	2–4–1	T–8th			
1960	Woody Hayes	7–2	5–2	3rd		8	8
1961	Woody Hayes	8–0–1	6–0	1st		2	2
1962	Woody Hayes	6–3	4–3	T–3rd		13	
1963	Woody Hayes	5–3–1	4–1–1	T–2nd			
1964	Woody Hayes	7–2	5–1	2nd		9	9
1965	Woody Hayes	7–2	6–1	2nd		11	
1966	Woody Hayes	4–5	3–4	6th			
1967	Woody Hayes	6–3	5–2	4th			
1968	Woody Hayes	10–0	7–0	1st	W Rose	1	1
1969	Woody Hayes	8–1	6–1	T–1st		5	4
1970	Woody Hayes	9–1	7–0	1st	L Rose	2	5
1971	Woody Hayes	6–4	5–3	T–3rd			
1972	Woody Hayes	9–2	7–1	T–1st	L Rose	3	9
1973	Woody Hayes	10–0–1	7–0–1	T–1st	W Rose	3	2
1974	Woody Hayes	10–2	7–1	T–1st	L Rose	3	4
1975	Woody Hayes	11–1	8–0	1st	L Rose	4	4
1976	Woody Hayes	9–2–1	7–1	T–1st	W Orange	5	6
1977	Woody Hayes	9–3	7–1	T–1st	L Sugar	12	11
1978	Woody Hayes	7–4–1	6–2	4th	L Gator		
Earle Bruce (Big Ten Conference) (1979–1987)
1979	Earle Bruce	11–1	8–0	1st	L Rose	4	4
1980	Earle Bruce	9–3	7–1	T–2nd	L Fiesta	15	15
1981	Earle Bruce	9–3	6–2	T–1st	W Liberty	12	15
1982	Earle Bruce	9–3	7–1	2nd	W Holiday	12	12
1983	Earle Bruce	9–3	6–3	4th	W Fiesta	8	9
1984	Earle Bruce	9–3	7–2	1st	L Rose	12	13
1985	Earle Bruce	9–3	5–3	T–4th	W Florida Citrus	11	14
1986	Earle Bruce	10–3	7–1	T–1st	W Cotton	6	7
1987	Earle Bruce	6–4–1	4–4	5th			
John Cooper (Big Ten Conference) (1988–2000)
1988	John Cooper	4–6–1	2–5–1	T–7th			
1989	John Cooper	8–4	6–2	T–3rd	L Hall of Fame		21
1990	John Cooper	7–4–1	5–2–1	5th	L Liberty		
1991	John Cooper	8–4	5–3	T–3rd	L Hall of Fame		
1992	John Cooper	8–3–1	5–2–1	2nd	L Florida Citrus	19	18
1993	John Cooper	10–1–1	6–1–1	T–1st	W Holiday	10	11
1994	John Cooper	9–4	6–2	2nd	L Florida Citrus	9	14
1995	John Cooper	11–2	7–1	2nd	L Florida Citrus	8	6
1996	John Cooper	11–1	7–1	T–1st	W Rose	2	2
1997	John Cooper	10–3	6–2	T–2nd	L Sugar^{†}	12	12
1998	John Cooper	11–1	7–1	T–1st	W Sugar^{†}	2	2
1999	John Cooper	6–6	3–5	T–8th			
2000	John Cooper	8–4	5–3	4th	L Outback		
Jim Tressel (Big Ten Conference) (2001–2010)
2001	Jim Tressel	7–5	5–3	3rd	L Outback		
2002	Jim Tressel	14–0	8–0	T–1st	W Fiesta^{†}	1	1
2003	Jim Tressel	11–2	6–2	T–2nd	W Fiesta^{†}	4	4
2004	Jim Tressel	8–4	4–4	T–5th	W Alamo	19	20
2005	Jim Tressel	10–2	7–1	T–1st	W Fiesta^{†}	4	4
2006	Jim Tressel	12–1	8–0	1st	L BCS NCG^{†}	2	2
2007	Jim Tressel	11–2	7–1	1st	L BCS NCG^{†}	5	5
2008	Jim Tressel	10–3	7–1	T–1st	L Fiesta^{†}	9	9
2009	Jim Tressel	11–2	7–1	1st	W Rose^{†}	5	5
2010	Jim Tressel	0–1 (Note: Ohio State vacated all 12 of its victories and its Big Ten Conference championship from the 2010 season.)	0–1	T–1st	W Sugar^{†}	5	5
Luke Fickell (Big Ten Conference) (2011)
2011	Luke Fickell (Note: Luke Fickell was named as the interim head coach of the Ohio State Buckeyes in 2011, following Jim Tressel's dismissal on May 30, 2011.)	6–7	3–5	4th (Leaders)	L Gator		
Urban Meyer (Big Ten Conference) (2012–2018)
2012	Urban Meyer	12–0	8–0	1st (Leaders)	Ineligible (Note: In 2012, Ohio State was ineligible for the Big Ten Conference title, postseason play, and the Coaches Poll.)		3
2013	Urban Meyer	12–2	8–0	1st (Leaders)	L Orange^{†}	10	12
2014	Urban Meyer	14–1	8–0	1st (East)	W Sugar^{†} (CFP Semifinal); W CFP NCG^{†}	1	1
2015	Urban Meyer	12–1	7–1	T–1st (East)	W Fiesta^{†}	4	4
2016	Urban Meyer	11–2	8–1	T–1st (East)	L Fiesta^{†} (CFP Semifinal)	6	6
2017	Urban Meyer	12–2	8–1	1st (East)	W Cotton^{†}	5	5
2018	Urban Meyer (Note: Meyer was placed on administrative leave for the first three games of the 2018 season. Offensive coordinator Ryan Day served as acting head coach in his absence, and Ohio State credits the first three games to Day and the final 11 games to Meyer. Under Day, the Buckeyes won all three contests, one of which was a conference game. Ohio State finished with a record of 13–1 and conference mark of 8–1.)	13–1	8–1	T–1st (East)	W Rose^{†}	3	3
Ryan Day (Big Ten Conference) (2019–present)
2019	Ryan Day	13–1	9–0	1st (East)	L Fiesta^{†} (CFP Semifinal)	3	3
2020	Ryan Day	7–1	5–0	1st (East)	W Sugar^{†} (CFP Semifinal); L CFP NCG^{†}	2	2
2021	Ryan Day	11–2	8–1	T–1st (East)	W Rose^{†}	5	6
2022	Ryan Day	11–2	8–1	2nd (East)	L Peach^{†} (CFP Semifinal)	4	4
2023	Ryan Day	11–2	8–1	2nd (East)	L Cotton^{†}	10	10
2024	Ryan Day	14–2	7–2	4th	W CFP First Round^{†} W Rose^{†} (CFP Quarterfinal); W Cotton^{†} (CFP Semifinal); W CFP NCG^{†}	1	1
2025	Ryan Day	12–2	9–0	T–1st	L Cotton^{†} (CFP Quarterfinal)	6	5
Total:		990–337–53					
National championship Conference title Conference division title or championship game berth
^{†}Indicates Bowl Coalition, Bowl Alliance, BCS, or CFP / New Years' Six bowl.; ^{#}Rankings from final Coaches Poll.

=== All-time records ===
Records current through January 1, 2026.

Statistic	Wins	Losses	Ties	Winning Percentage
Regular season record (1890–2025)	958	302	53	.750
Bowl game record (1890–2025)	30	30	—	.500
CFP game record (2014–2025)	7	5	—	.583
All-time regular and bowl game record (1890–2025)	990	337	53	.737
