= List of Ohio State Buckeyes bowl games =

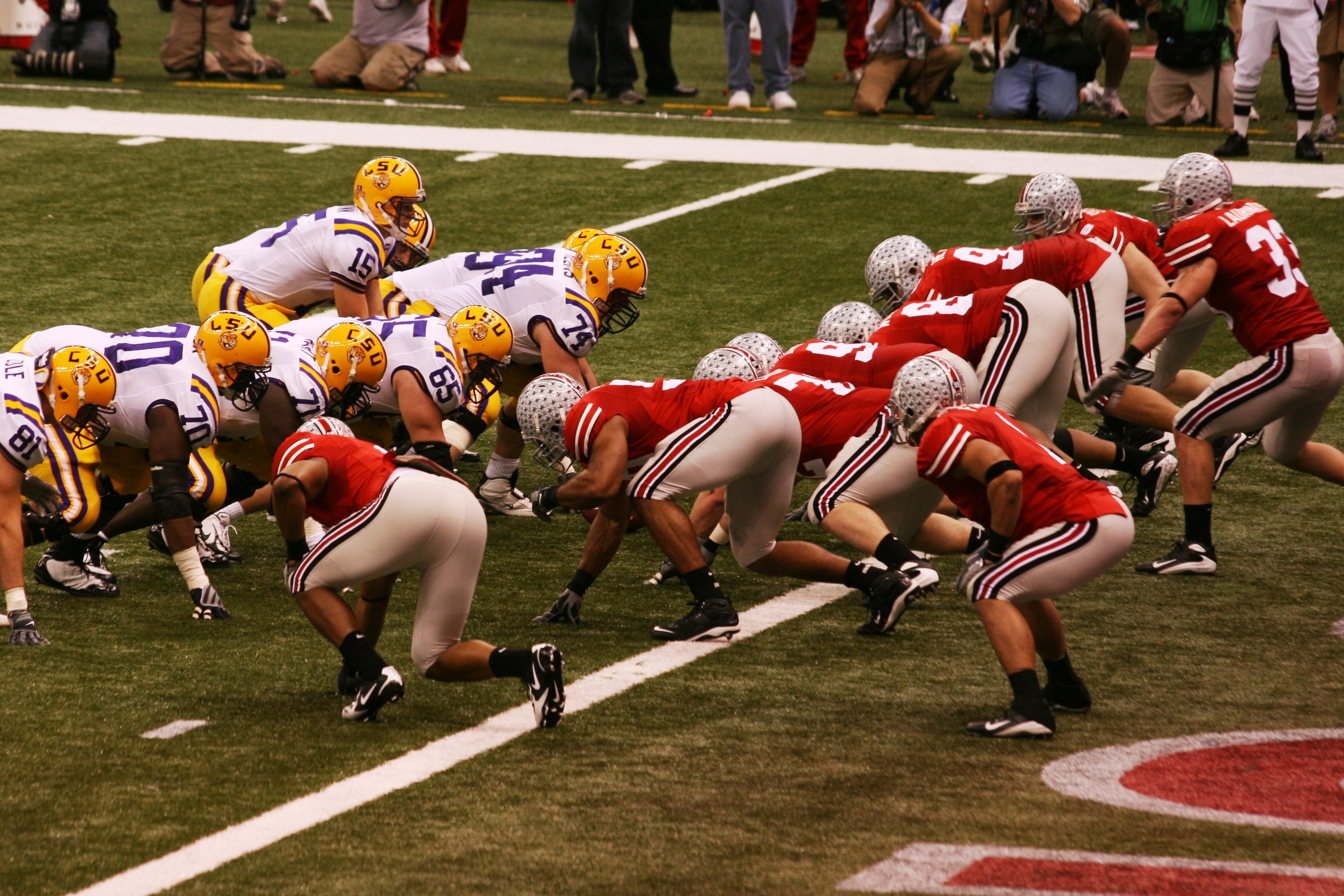
The Buckeyes line up on defense in the 2008 BCS National Championship Game.

The Ohio State Buckeyes football team competes as part of the National Collegiate Athletic Association (NCAA) Division I Football Bowl Subdivision (FBS), representing the Ohio State University in the Big Ten Conference. Since the establishment of the football program in 1890, the Buckeyes have played in 60 bowl games. Included in these games are 34 appearances in the "big four" bowl games (the Rose, Sugar, Orange, and Fiesta), including one national championship victory in the 2003 Fiesta Bowl, two appearances in the BCS National Championship Game, and three appearances in the College Football Playoff National Championship, including two national championship victories in the 2015 College Football Playoff National Championship and the 2025 College Football Playoff National Championship.

Ohio State's first bowl game came during the 1920 season when, under the leadership of eighth year head coach John Wilce, the team went on to the Rose Bowl where they would be defeated by California 28–0. Following their first Rose Bowl appearance, the school would not make another bowl appearance until 1949, when head coach Wes Fesler led the Buckeyes to the Rose Bowl again, this time defeating the California Golden Bears 17–14. Following Fesler, Woody Hayes took over the position of head coach at Ohio State and during his career would lead the Buckeyes to eleven bowl games and compiling a 5–6 record. The Buckeyes appeared in the Rose Bowl eight times during Hayes' tenure and would go 4–4 in those games. Hayes would also lead the Buckeyes to one Orange Bowl, one Sugar Bowl, and one Gator Bowl appearance during his time as head coach.

Earle Bruce became the head coach of the Ohio State Buckeyes following Woody Hayes in 1979. Bruce would lead the Buckeyes to the Rose Bowl in his first season, coming one point away from a national championship, losing to the USC Trojans 17–16. Over Bruce's career, the Buckeyes would make eight bowl appearances going 5–3 in those games. Ohio State also made two Rose Bowl appearances under Bruce, in which the team went 0–2. Following Bruce, John Cooper became the head coach of the Buckeyes and would lead the school to ten bowl appearances, including one Rose Bowl victory in 1997, the school's first Rose Bowl victory since 1974. Cooper would lead the Buckeyes to a 3–8 bowl record during his tenure. Cooper would also lead the Buckeyes to the Sugar Bowl in 1999, the first Bowl Championship Series appearance for Ohio State.

Jim Tressel was hired as the head coach of the Buckeyes in 2001 and would remain head coach at the university until 2010. Under Tressel, Ohio State made a bowl appearance in all his ten seasons as head coach and made eight BCS bowl appearances for a total of nine appearances for the university, the most of any other school. Tressel would also lead the Buckeyes to the national championship game in 2002, where the Buckeyes defeated the Miami Hurricanes 31–24 in double overtime for their first national championship since 1970. Tressel compiled an overall bowl record of 5–4 with one vacated victory, including three appearances in the BCS National Championship Game, four appearances in the Fiesta Bowl, one in the Rose Bowl, one in the Sugar Bowl, one in the Outback Bowl, and one in the Alamo Bowl. Ohio State would also reach the Gator Bowl in 2011 under head coach Luke Fickell, which they would lose 24–17 to the Florida Gators.

In November 2011, Urban Meyer was hired as the head coach and has led the Buckeyes to bowl games in five seasons during his time at Ohio State. Meyer led the Buckeyes to their tenth BCS bowl against Clemson in the Orange Bowl. In 2014, Meyer led the Buckeyes to the inaugural College Football Playoff, where the Buckeyes defeated Alabama in the Sugar Bowl and Oregon in the College Football Playoff National Championship, to win the program's eighth national championship. In their 2015–16 bowl appearance, Ohio State defeated Notre Dame in the Fiesta Bowl. The win in that game brought Ohio State's overall bowl record to 22 wins and 24 losses. Meyer also led the Buckeyes to the 4th seed in the college football playoffs in the 2016–17 season. The Buckeyes fell to Clemson in that game 31–0. During the 2017–18 season, the Buckeyes played in the 2017 Cotton Bowl Classic, where they defeated the USC Trojans 24–7. Ohio State would play the following year in the 2019 Rose Bowl. It would be Ohio State's 15th Rose Bowl appearance and final bowl game for coach Urban Meyer. The Buckeyes would go on to defeat Pac-12 champion Washington 28–23. Starting in 2024, the College Football Playoff expanded to 12 teams, with first round games behind played at campus stadiums.

As of December 2024, Ohio State has said they will not count CFP First Round games as bowl game appearances. Following the 2024 season, Ohio State won three consecutive CFP bowl games en route to winning the national championship over Notre Dame.

== Key ==
General
†	Bowl game record attendance
‡	Former bowl game record attendance
§	Denotes College Football Playoff game
*	Denotes national championship game

Results
W	Win
L	Loss
T	Tie

== Bowl games ==
List of bowl games showing bowl played in, score, date, season, opponent, stadium, location, attendance and head coach (Note: Statistics correct as of 2019–20 NCAA football bowl games.)
#	Bowl	Score (Note: Results are sortable first by whether the result was an Ohio State win, loss or tie and then second by the margin of victory.)	Date	Season (Note: Links to the season article for the Ohio State team that competed in the bowl for that year.)	Opponent (Note: Links to the season article for the opponent that Ohio State competed against in the bowl for that year when available or to their general page when unavailable.)	Stadium	Location	Attendance	Head coach
1	Rose Bowl	L 28–0	January 1, 1921	1920	California Golden Bears	Rose Bowl	Pasadena	42,000‡	John Wilce
2	Rose Bowl	W 17–14	January 1, 1950	1949	California Golden Bears	Rose Bowl	Pasadena	100,963‡	Wes Fesler
3	Rose Bowl	W 20–7	January 1, 1955	1954	USC Trojans	Rose Bowl	Pasadena	89,191	Woody Hayes
4	Rose Bowl	W 10–7	January 1, 1958	1957	Oregon Ducks	Rose Bowl	Pasadena	98,201	Woody Hayes
5	Rose Bowl	W 27–16	January 1, 1969	1968	USC Trojans	Rose Bowl	Pasadena	102,063	Woody Hayes
6	Rose Bowl	L 27–17	January 1, 1971	1970	Stanford Indians	Rose Bowl	Pasadena	103,839	Woody Hayes
7	Rose Bowl	L 42–17	January 1, 1973	1972	USC Trojans	Rose Bowl	Pasadena	106,869†	Woody Hayes
8	Rose Bowl	W 42–21	January 1, 1974	1973	USC Trojans	Rose Bowl	Pasadena	105,267	Woody Hayes
9	Rose Bowl	L 18–17	January 1, 1975	1974	USC Trojans	Rose Bowl	Pasadena	106,721	Woody Hayes
10	Rose Bowl	L 23–10	January 1, 1976	1975	UCLA Bruins	Rose Bowl	Pasadena	105,464	Woody Hayes
11	Orange Bowl	W 27–10	January 1, 1977	1976	Colorado Buffaloes	Orange Bowl	Miami	65,537	Woody Hayes
12	Sugar Bowl	L 35–6	January 2, 1978	1977	Alabama Crimson Tide	Louisiana Superdome	New Orleans	76,811	Woody Hayes
13	Gator Bowl	L 17–15	December 29, 1978	1978	Clemson Tigers	Gator Bowl	Jacksonville	72,011	Woody Hayes
14	Rose Bowl	L 17–16	January 1, 1980	1979	USC Trojans	Rose Bowl	Pasadena	105,526	Earle Bruce
15	Fiesta Bowl	L 31–19	December 26, 1980	1980	Penn State Nittany Lions	Sun Devil Stadium	Tempe	66,738‡	Earle Bruce
16	Liberty Bowl	W 31–28	December 30, 1981	1981	Navy Midshipmen	Liberty Bowl Memorial Stadium	Memphis	43,216	Earle Bruce
17	Holiday Bowl	W 47–17	December 17, 1982	1982	BYU Cougars	Jack Murphy Stadium	San Diego	52,533‡	Earle Bruce
18	Fiesta Bowl	W 28–23	January 2, 1984	1983	Pittsburgh Panthers	Sun Devil Stadium	Tempe	66,484	Earle Bruce
19	Rose Bowl	L 20–17	January 1, 1985	1984	USC Trojans	Rose Bowl	Pasadena	102,594	Earle Bruce
20	Florida Citrus Bowl	W 10–7	December 28, 1985	1985	BYU Cougars	Citrus Bowl	Orlando	50,920	Earle Bruce
21	Cotton Bowl Classic	W 28–12	January 1, 1987	1986	Texas A&M Aggies	Cotton	Dallas	74,188	Earle Bruce
22	Hall of Fame Bowl	L 31–14	January 1, 1990	1989	Auburn Tigers	Tampa Stadium	Tampa	52,535	John Cooper
23	Liberty Bowl	L 23–11	December 27, 1990	1990	Air Force Falcons	Liberty Bowl Memorial Stadium	Memphis	13,144	John Cooper
24	Hall of Fame Bowl	L 24–17	January 1, 1992	1991	Syracuse Orangemen	Tampa Stadium	Tampa	57,789	John Cooper
25	Florida Citrus Bowl	L 21–14	January 1, 1993	1992	Georgia Bulldogs	Citrus Bowl	Orlando	65,816	John Cooper
26	Holiday Bowl	W 28–21	December 30, 1993	1993	BYU Cougars	Jack Murphy Stadium	San Diego	52,108	John Cooper
27	Florida Citrus Bowl	L 24–17	January 2, 1995	1994	Alabama Crimson Tide	Citrus Bowl	Orlando	71,195	John Cooper
28	Florida Citrus Bowl	L 20–14	January 2, 1996	1995	Tennessee Volunteers	Citrus Bowl	Orlando	70,797	John Cooper
29	Rose Bowl	W 20–17	January 1, 1997	1996	Arizona State Sun Devils	Rose Bowl	Pasadena	100,635	John Cooper
30	Sugar Bowl	L 31–14	January 1, 1998	1997	Florida State Seminoles	Louisiana Superdome	New Orleans	67,289	John Cooper
31	Sugar Bowl	W 24–14	January 1, 1999	1998	Texas A&M Aggies	Louisiana Superdome	New Orleans	76,503	John Cooper
32	Outback Bowl	L 24–7	January 1, 2001	2000	South Carolina Gamecocks	Raymond James Stadium	Tampa	65,299	John Cooper
33	Outback Bowl	L 31–28	January 1, 2002	2001	South Carolina Gamecocks	Raymond James Stadium	Tampa	66,249†	Jim Tressel
34	Fiesta Bowl*	W 31–24^{2OT}	January 3, 2003	2002	Miami Hurricanes	Sun Devil Stadium	Tempe	77,502	Jim Tressel
35	Fiesta Bowl	W 35–28	January 2, 2004	2003	Kansas State Wildcats	Sun Devil Stadium	Tempe	73,425	Jim Tressel
36	Alamo Bowl	W 33–7	December 29, 2004	2004	Oklahoma State Cowboys	Alamodome	San Antonio	65,265	Jim Tressel
37	Fiesta Bowl	W 34–20	January 2, 2006	2005	Notre Dame Fighting Irish	Sun Devil Stadium	Tempe	76,196	Jim Tressel
38	BCS National Championship Game*	L 41–14	January 8, 2007	2006	Florida Gators	University of Phoenix Stadium	Glendale	74,628‡	Jim Tressel
39	BCS National Championship Game*	L 38–24	January 7, 2008	2007	LSU Tigers	Louisiana Superdome	New Orleans	79,651‡	Jim Tressel
40	Fiesta Bowl	L 24–21	January 5, 2009	2008	Texas Longhorns	University of Phoenix Stadium	Glendale	72,047	Jim Tressel
41	Rose Bowl	W 26–17	January 1, 2010	2009	Oregon Ducks	Rose Bowl	Pasadena	93,963	Jim Tressel
42	Sugar Bowl	W* 31–26 (Note: Ohio State voluntarily vacated their Sugar Bowl victory following NCAA allegations.)	January 4, 2011	2010	Arkansas Razorbacks	Louisiana Superdome	New Orleans	73,879	Jim Tressel
43	Gator Bowl	L 24–17	January 2, 2012	2011	Florida Gators	EverBank Field	Jacksonville	61,312	Luke Fickell (interim)
44	Orange Bowl	L 40–35	January 3, 2014	2013	Clemson Tigers	Sun Life Stadium	Miami	72,080	Urban Meyer
45	Sugar Bowl§	W 42–35	January 1, 2015	2014	Alabama Crimson Tide	Mercedes-Benz Superdome	New Orleans	74,682	Urban Meyer
46	CFP National Championship*	W 42–20	January 12, 2015	2014	Oregon Ducks	AT&T Stadium	Arlington	85,689	Urban Meyer
47	Fiesta Bowl	W 44–28	January 1, 2016	2015	Notre Dame Fighting Irish	University of Phoenix Stadium	Glendale	71,123	Urban Meyer
48	Fiesta Bowl§	L 31–0	December 31, 2016	2016	Clemson Tigers	University of Phoenix Stadium	Glendale	70,236	Urban Meyer
49	Cotton Bowl Classic	W 24–7	December 29, 2017	2017	USC Trojans	AT&T Stadium	Arlington	67,510	Urban Meyer
50	Rose Bowl	W 28–23	January 1, 2019	2018	Washington Huskies	Rose Bowl	Pasadena	91,853	Urban Meyer
51	Fiesta Bowl§	L 29–23	December 28, 2019	2019	Clemson Tigers	State Farm Stadium	Glendale	71,330	Ryan Day
52	Sugar Bowl§	W 49–28	January 1, 2021	2020	Clemson Tigers	Mercedes-Benz Superdome	New Orleans	3,000	Ryan Day
53	CFP National Championship*	L 52–24	January 11, 2021	2020	Alabama Crimson Tide	Hard Rock Stadium	Miami Gardens	14,926	Ryan Day
54	Rose Bowl	W 48–45	January 1, 2022	2021	Utah Utes	Rose Bowl Stadium	Pasadena	87,842	Ryan Day
55	Peach Bowl§	L 42–41	December 31, 2022	2022	Georgia Bulldogs	Mercedes-Benz Stadium	Atlanta	79,330	Ryan Day
56	Cotton Bowl Classic	L 14–3	December 29, 2023	2023	Missouri Tigers	AT&T Stadium	Arlington	70,114	Ryan Day
57	Rose Bowl§	W 41–21	January 1, 2025	2024	Oregon Ducks	Rose Bowl Stadium	Pasadena	90,732	Ryan Day
58	Cotton Bowl Classic§	W 28–14	January 10, 2025	2024	Texas Longhorns	AT&T Stadium	Arlington	74,527	Ryan Day
59	CFP National Championship*	W 34–23	January 20, 2025	2024	Notre Dame Fighting Irish	Mercedes-Benz Stadium	Atlanta	77,660	Ryan Day
60	Cotton Bowl Classic§	L 24–14	December 31, 2025	2025	Miami Hurricanes	AT&T Stadium	Arlington	71,323	Ryan Day

== Record by bowl ==
Bowl	App.	Wins	Losses	Win Pct.	Most Recent Result
Rose Bowl	17	10	7	.588	W 41–21 vs. Oregon (2024)
Fiesta Bowl	9	5	4	.556	L 23–29 vs. Clemson (2019)
Sugar Bowl	6	3 *	2	.667	W 49–28 vs. Clemson (2021)
Citrus Bowl	4	1	3	.250	L 14–20 vs. Tennessee (1995)
ReliaQuest Bowl^{b}	4	0	4	.000	L 28–31 vs. South Carolina (2002)
Cotton Bowl	5	3	2	.600	L 24–14 vs. Miami (Fla) (2025)
CFP National Championship Game	3	2	1	.667	W 34–23 vs. Notre Dame (2024)
BCS National Championship Game	3	1	2	.333	L 24–38 vs. LSU (2008)
Holiday Bowl	2	2	0	1.000	W 28–21 vs. BYU (1993)
Orange Bowl	2	1	1	.500	L 35–40 vs. Clemson (2014)
Liberty Bowl	2	1	1	.500	L 11–23 vs. Air Force (1990)
Gator Bowl^{a}	2	0	2	.000	L 17–24 vs. Florida (2012)
Alamo Bowl	1	1	0	1.000	W 33–7 vs. Oklahoma State (2004)
Peach Bowl	1	0	1	.000	L 41-42 vs Georgia (2022)

*One Sugar Bowl Win vacated.

^{a} The Gator Bowl was formerly called the TaxSlayer Bowl ^{b} The ReliaQuest Bowl was formerly called the Outback Bowl and Hall of Fame Bowl

Bowl Selector	App.	Wins	Losses	Win Pct.	Most Recent Result
College Football Playoff	11	6	5	.545	L 14–24 vs. Miami (FL) (2025 Cotton Bowl Classic)
New Years Six	10	7	3	.700	W 48–45 vs. Utah (2022 Rose Bowl)
Bowl Championship Series	10	5*	4	.556	L 35–40 vs. Clemson (2014 Orange Bowl)
Bowl Alliance	1	0	1	.000	L 14–31 vs. Florida State (1998 Sugar Bowl)
