= 1998 Big Ten Conference football season =

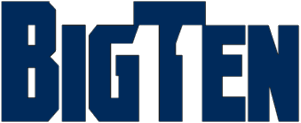
- League: NCAA Division I-A
- Sport: football
- Teams: 11
- Co-champions: Ohio State, Wisconsin, Michigan

Football seasons

1998 Big Ten Conference football standings
	Conf.			Overall
Team	W		L	W		L
No. 2 Ohio State %+	7	–	1	11	–	1
No. 6 Wisconsin $+	7	–	1	11	–	1
No. 12 Michigan +	7	–	1	10	–	3
No. 24 Purdue	6	–	2	9	–	4
No. 17 Penn State	5	–	3	9	–	3
Michigan State	4	–	4	6	–	6
Minnesota	2	–	6	5	–	6
Indiana	2	–	6	4	–	7
Illinois	2	–	6	3	–	8
Iowa	2	–	6	3	–	8
Northwestern	0	–	8	3	–	9
$ – BCS representative as conference champion; % – BCS at-large representative; + – Conference co-champions; Rankings from AP Poll

The 1998 Big Ten Conference football season was the 103rd season of college football played by the member schools of the Big Ten Conference and was a part of the 1998 NCAA Division I-A football season.

== Regular season ==
No. 2 Ohio State, No. 6 Wisconsin, and No. 12 Michigan all went 7-1 in conference play, creating a three-way tie for the championship. Ohio State and Wisconsin did not meet in 1998, while Michigan lost to Ohio State but defeated Wisconsin. Ohio State's lone conference loss was to an unranked Michigan State team while they were ranked No. 1. Due to the conference tie-breaker rule, Wisconsin represented the Big Ten in the Rose Bowl since Michigan had just played in the 1998 Rose Bowl and Ohio State had played there the year before. The Badgers had last visited Pasadena in 1994. Ohio State earned an at-large bid for the Sugar Bowl while Michigan went to the Citrus Bowl.

No. 24 Purdue earned fourth place at 6-2 (9-4 overall), No. 17 Penn State fifth at 5-3 (9-3 overall), and Michigan State sixth at 4-4 (6-6 overall).

There was a four-way tie for seventh place between Minnesota, Indiana, Illinois, and Iowa, who all had 2-6 conference records.

Just two years removed from back-to-back Big Ten championships, Northwestern finished last with an 0-8 conference mark (3-9 overall).

== Bowl games ==
Five Big Ten teams played in bowl games, with the conference going undefeated at 5-0:

Bowl					Site
Sugar Bowl	No. 4 Ohio State	24	No. 8 Texas A&M	14	New Orleans, LA
Rose Bowl	No. 9 Wisconsin	38	No. 6 UCLA	31	Pasadena, CA
Florida Citrus Bowl	No. 15 Michigan	45	No. 11 Arkansas	31	Orlando, FL
Outback Bowl	No. 22 Penn State	26	Kentucky	14	Tampa, FL
Alamo Bowl	Purdue	37	No. 3 Kansas State	34	San Antonio, TX

Rankings are from the AP Poll and were set prior to the bowl games being played.
