= 1999 Sugar Bowl =

1999 Nokia Sugar Bowl
- BCS Bowl Game; 65th Sugar Bowl
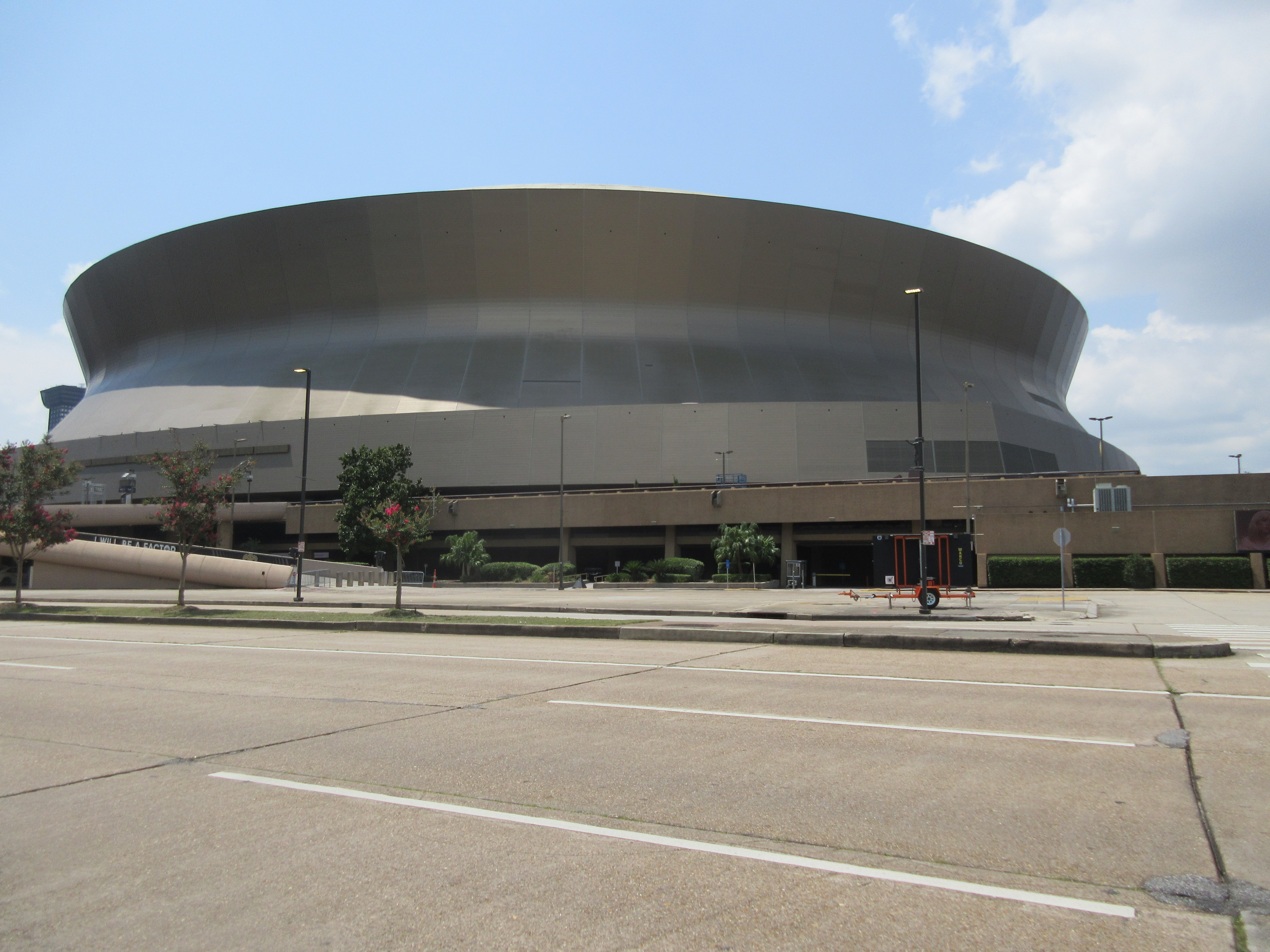
- The Louisiana Superdome in New Orleans, Louisiana, hosted the Sugar Bowl.
Texas A&M Aggies	Ohio State Buckeyes
(11–2)	(10–1)
Big 12	Big Ten
14	24
Head coach: R.C. Slocum	Head coach: John Cooper
AP / Coaches / BCS; 8 / 9 / 6	AP / Coaches / BCS; 3 / 3 / 4
	1	2	3	4	Total
Texas A&M	7	0	7	0	14
Ohio State	21	3	0	0	24
- Date: January 1, 1999
- Season: 1998
- Stadium: Louisiana Superdome
- Location: New Orleans, Louisiana
- MVP: David Boston (WR, Ohio State)
- Favorite: Ohio State by 12 points (49.5)
- Referee: Al Ford (SEC)
- Attendance: 76,503

United States TV coverage
- Network: ABC
- Announcers: Brent Musburger, Dan Fouts and Jack Arute
- Nielsen ratings: 11.5

The 1999 Sugar Bowl was an American college football bowl game played on January 1, 1999. It was the 65th edition of the Sugar Bowl and featured the Ohio State Buckeyes, and the Texas A&M Aggies. Ohio State entered the game ranked number 4 in the BCS at 10–1, whereas Texas A&M entered the game at 11–2, and ranked number 6 in the BCS. Sponsored by Nokia, the game was officially known as the Nokia Sugar Bowl.

== Teams ==
The Sugar Bowl during the BCS era usually selected the SEC champion; however, the winner of the SEC, Tennessee was selected to play in the Fiesta Bowl for the national title. The next-highest ranked SEC team, Florida was selected to play in Orange Bowl instead, leaving no SEC representatives for the Sugar Bowl. As a result, Big 12 champion Texas A&M and Big Ten co-champion Ohio State were selected.

=== Texas A&M Aggies ===
Texas A&M defeated Kansas State in the 1998 Big 12 Championship Game to earn a BCS berth as their conference's champion. Texas A&M entered the bowl with an 11–2 record (7–1 in conference).

=== Ohio State Buckeyes ===
Ohio State ended up in a three-way tie for first place in the Big Ten with Michigan and Wisconsin. At the time, the Big Ten awarded the Rose Bowl invitation to the tied team which had gone the longest period of time without an invitation: Michigan had been in the 1998 Rose Bowl, Ohio State had been in the 1997 Rose Bowl, while Wisconsin had last been in the 1994 Rose Bowl, meaning the Badgers would get the invitation. Ohio State entered the bowl with a 10–1 record (7–1 in conference).

== Game summary ==
Texas A&M scored first on a 9-yard touchdown run by Dante Hall to open the game 7–0. Joe Germaine threw a 19-yard touchdown pass to Reggie Germany to tie the game at 7–7. Later in the quarter, running back Joe Montgomery rushed 10 yards for a touchdown, and Ohio State opened up a 14–7 lead.

Derek Ross blocked an A&M punt, that Kevin Griffin returned 16 yards for a touchdown. Ohio State led 21–7 after the first quarter. Ohio State kicked a 31-yard field goal in the second quarter to open up a 24–7 halftime lead. Texas A&M closed to 24–14 on a 7-yard touchdown pass from Branndon Stewart to Leroy Hodge. Ohio State's defense was stout throughout the contest, and they held on to win, 24–14.

=== Scoring summary ===
Scoring summary

Quarter	Time	Drive			Team	Scoring information	Score	
Quarter	Time	Plays	Yards	TOP	Team	Scoring information	A&M	OSU
1	10:53	6	59	2:26	A&M	Dante Hall 9-yard touchdown run, Russell Bynum kick good	7	0
1	8:34	8	71	2:19	OSU	Reggie Germany 18-yard touchdown reception from Joe Germaine, Dan Stultz kick good	7	7
1	4:10	6	71	2:41	OSU	Joe Montgomery 10-yard touchdown run, Dan Stultz kick good	7	14
1	1:59	1	16	0:10	OSU	Kevin Griffin 16 yd blocked punt return, Dan Stultz kick good	7	21
2	0:16	9	40	1:45	OSU	31-yard field goal by Dan Stultz	7	24
3	5:24	11	68	3:32	A&M	Leroy Hodge 7-yard touchdown reception from Branndon Stewart, Russell Bynum kick good	14	24
"TOP" = time of possession. For other American football terms, see Glossary of American football.							14	24

=== Statistics ===
	1	2	3	4	Total
No. 6 Aggies	7	0	7	0	14
No. 4 Buckeyes	21	3	0	0	24

Statistics	A&M	OSU
First downs	17	25
Plays–yards	66–283	80–432
Rushes–yards	27–96	42–210
Passing yards	187	222
Passing: comp–att–int	22–39–0	21–38–0
Turnovers		
Time of possession	28:18	31:42

Team	Category	Player	Statistics
Texas A&M	Passing	Branndon Stewart	22/39, 187 yds, 1 TD
Texas A&M	Rushing	Ja'Mar Toombs	10 car, 62 yds
Texas A&M	Receiving	Chris Taylor	5 rec, 52 yds
Ohio State	Passing	Joe Germaine	21/38, 222 yds, 1 TD
Ohio State	Rushing	Joe Montgomery	9 car, 96 yds
Ohio State	Receiving	David Boston	11 rec, 105 yds
