= 1998 Ohio State Buckeyes football team =

American college football season

1998 Ohio State Buckeyes football

Big Ten co-champion Sugar Bowl champion

Sugar Bowl, W 24–14 vs. Texas A&M
- Conference: Big Ten Conference

Ranking
- Coaches: No. 2
- AP: No. 2
- Record: 11–1 (7–1 Big Ten)
- Head coach: John Cooper (11th season)
- Offensive coordinator: Mike Jacobs (2nd season)
- Offensive scheme: Singleback
- Defensive coordinator: Fred Pagac (3rd season)
- Base defense: 4–3
- MVP: Joe Germaine
- Captains: Joe Germaine; Jerry Rudzinski; Antoine Winfield
- Home stadium: Ohio Stadium

1998 Big Ten Conference football standings
	Conf.			Overall
Team	W		L	W		L
No. 2 Ohio State %+	7	–	1	11	–	1
No. 6 Wisconsin $+	7	–	1	11	–	1
No. 12 Michigan +	7	–	1	10	–	3
No. 24 Purdue	6	–	2	9	–	4
No. 17 Penn State	5	–	3	9	–	3
Michigan State	4	–	4	6	–	6
Minnesota	2	–	6	5	–	6
Indiana	2	–	6	4	–	7
Illinois	2	–	6	3	–	8
Iowa	2	–	6	3	–	8
Northwestern	0	–	8	3	–	9
$ – BCS representative as conference champion; % – BCS at-large representative; + – Conference co-champions; Rankings from AP Poll

The 1998 Ohio State Buckeyes football team was an American football team that represented the Ohio State University as a member of the Big Ten Conference during the 1998 NCAA Division I-A football season. In their eleventh year under head coach John Cooper, the Buckeyes compiled a 11–1 record (7–1 in conference games), finished in a three-way tie with Wisconsin and Michigan for the Big Ten championship, and outscored opponents by a total of 506 to 130. Against ranked opponents, the Buckeyes defeated No. 11 West Virginia, No. 21 Missouri, No. 7 Penn State, and No. 11 Michigan. Their sole loss was to unranked Michigan State, a November 7 loss that dropped the Buckeyes from No. 1 to No. 7 in the following week's AP poll. The Buckeyes concluded the season with a 24–14 victory over No. 8 Texas A&M in the 1999 Sugar Bowl. Ohio State was ranked No. 2 in the final AP and Coaches polls.

The Buckeyes gained an average of 182.1 rushing yards and 279.5 passing yards per game. On defense, they gave up 61.8 rushing yards and 174.5 passing yards per game. The team's statistical leaders included senior quarterback Joe Germaine (3,108 passing yards, 60.4% completion percentage), running back Michael Wiley (1,147 rushing yards, 6.3 yards per carry), wide receiver David Boston (74 receptions for 1,330 yards, 14 touchdowns), and kicker Dan Stultz (92 points scored on 50 of 51 extra points, 12 of 22 field goals). Cornerback Antoine Winfield was selected as a consensus first-team All-American. David Boston and safety Damon Moore also received first-team All-America honors from the Football Writers Association of America (FWAA) and The Sporting News, respectively. Eight Ohio State players received first-team honors on the 1998 All-Big Ten Conference football team: Germaine; Wiley; Boston; Winfield; Moore; guard Rob Murphy; and linebackers Na'il Diggs and Andy Katzenmoyer.

The team played its home games at Ohio Stadium in Columbus, Ohio.

== Schedule ==
Date	Time	Opponent	Rank	Site	TV	Result	Attendance
September 5	8:00 p.m.	at No. 11 West Virginia*	No. 1	Mountaineer Field; Morgantown, WV	CBS	W 34–17	68,409
September 12	12:30 p.m.	Toledo*	No. 1	Ohio Stadium; Columbus, OH	ESPN	W 49–0	93,149
September 19	3:30 p.m.	No. 21 Missouri*	No. 1	Ohio Stadium; Columbus, OH	ABC	W 35–14	93,269
October 3	12:00 p.m.	No. 7 Penn State	No. 1	Ohio Stadium; Columbus, OH (rivalry, College GameDay)	ABC	W 28–9	93,479
October 10	12:00 p.m.	at Illinois	No. 1	Memorial Stadium; Champaign, IL (Illibuck)	ESPN Plus	W 41–0	46,390
October 17	12:00 p.m.	Minnesota^{†}	No. 1	Ohio Stadium; Columbus, OH	ESPN Plus	W 45–15	93,138
October 24	12:00 p.m.	at Northwestern	No. 1	Ryan Field; Evanston, IL	ESPN2	W 36–10	47,130
October 31	3:30 p.m.	at Indiana	No. 1	Memorial Stadium; Bloomington, IN	ABC	W 38–7	52,049
November 7	3:30 p.m.	Michigan State	No. 1	Ohio Stadium; Columbus, OH	ABC	L 24–28	93,595
November 14	3:30 p.m.	at Iowa	No. 7	Kinnick Stadium; Iowa City, IA	ABC	W 45–14	69,473
November 21	12:00 p.m.	No. 11 Michigan	No. 7	Ohio Stadium; Columbus, OH (rivalry)	ABC	W 31–16	94,339
January 1, 1999	8:30 p.m.	vs. No. 8 Texas A&M*	No. 3	Louisiana Superdome; New Orleans, LA (Sugar Bowl)	ABC	W 24–14	76,503
*Non-conference game; ^{†}Homecoming; Rankings from AP Poll released prior to the game; All times are in Eastern time; Source:

== Rankings ==
Ranking movements Legend: ██ Increase in ranking ██ Decrease in ranking ( ) = First-place votes
	Week															
Poll	Pre	1	2	3	4	5	6	7	8	9	10	11	12	13	14	Final
AP	1 (30)	1 (39)	1 (57)	1 (64)	1 (58)	1 (66)	1 (64)	1 (64)	1 (64)	1 (63)	7	7	5	5	3	2
Coaches Poll	1 (31)	1 (38)	1 (52)	1 (53)	1 (45)	1 (54)	1 (59)	1 (58)	1 (55)	1 (54)	7	6	5 (1)	5 (1)	3 (1)	2
BCS	Not released								2	1	8	7	6	5	4	Not released

== Game summaries ==
=== West Virginia ===
#1 Ohio State Buckeyes at #11 West Virginia Mountaineers

Quarter	1	2	3	4	Total
Ohio State	10	10	7	7	34
West Virginia	3	7	0	7	17

at Mountaineer Field, Morgantown, West Virginia

- Date: September 5, 1998
- Game time: 8:00 p.m. EST
- Game weather: 76°, Clear & Mild, wind 5 S
- Game attendance: 68,409
- Referee: Dick Honig

Game information
First quarter
- WVU - Jay Taylor 47-yard field goal
- OSU - Dan Stultz 35-yard field goal
- OSU - Michael Wiley 18-yard run (Dan Stultz kick)

Second quarter

- OSU - Dee Miller 14-yard pass from Joe Germaine (Dan Stultz kick)
- OSU - Dan Stultz 36-yard field goal
- WVU - Shawn Foreman 6-yard pass from Marc Bulger (Jay Taylor kick)

Third quarter

- OSU - David Boston 39-yard pass from Joe Germaine (Dan Stultz kick)

Fourth quarter

- OSU - Jonathon Wells 7-yard rush (Dan Stultz kick)
- WVU - Shawn Foreman 3-yard pass from Marc Bulger (Jay Taylor kick)

=== Toledo ===
Toledo Rockets at #1 Ohio State Buckeyes

Quarter	1	2	3	4	Total
Toledo	0	0	0	0	0
Ohio State	21	21	7	0	49

at Ohio Stadium, Columbus, Ohio

- Date: September 12, 1998
- Game time: 12:30 p.m. EST
- Game weather: 85°, Clear & Sunny, wind 7 W
- Game attendance: 93,149
- Referee: D. Witvoet

Game information
First quarter
- OSU - Michael Wiley 76 yd run (Dan Stultz kick)
- OSU - Dee Miller 63 yd pass from Joe Germaine (Dan Stultz kick)
- OSU - David Boston 5 yd pass from Joe Germaine (Dan Stultz kick)

Second quarter

- OSU - Joe Montgomery 11 yd run (Dan Stultz kick)
- OSU - Reggie Germany 5 yd pass from Joe Germaine (Dan Stultz kick)
- OSU - Reggie Germany 47 yd pass from Mark Garcia (Dan Stultz kick)

Third quarter

- OSU - Michael Wiley 4 yd run (Dan Stultz kick)

Fourth quarter

- No scoring

=== Missouri ===
#21 Missouri Tigers at #1 Ohio State Buckeyes

Quarter	1	2	3	4	Total
Missouri	0	14	0	0	14
Ohio State	7	6	8	14	35

at Ohio Stadium, Columbus, Ohio

- Date: September 19, 1998
- Game time: 3:30 p.m. EST
- Game weather: 80°, Sunny, wind 5 S
- Game attendance: 93,269
- Referee: J. Kemerling

Game information
First quarter
- OSU - Michael Wiley 21 yd run (Dan Stultz kick)

Second quarter

- MIZ - Corby Jones 10 yd run (Tim Geiger kick)
- OSU - Dan Stultz 27 yd field goal
- MIZ - Carlos Posey 65 yd fumble recovery (Tim Geiger kick)
- OSU - Dan Stultz 36 yd field goal

Third quarter

- OSU - Joe Montgomery 6 yd run (David Boston pass from Joe Germaine)

Fourth quarter

- OSU - Michael Wiley 11 yd run (Dan Stultz kick)
- OSU - Derek Combs 9 yd run (Dan Stultz kick)

=== Penn State ===
#7 Penn State Nittany Lions at #1 Ohio State Buckeyes

Quarter	1	2	3	4	Total
Penn State	0	3	6	0	9
Ohio State	0	14	14	0	28

at Ohio Stadium, Columbus, Ohio

- Date: October 3, 1998
- Game time: 12:00 p.m. EST
- Game weather: 60°, Overcast Rain, wind 5-10 SSW
- Game attendance: 93,479
- Referee: Dick Honig

Game information

First quarter

- No scoring

Second quarter

- PSU - Forney 42-yard field goal
- OSU - Rudzinski recovered fumble in end zone (Stultz kick)
- OSU - Wiley 20-yard pass from Germaine (Stultz kick)

Third quarter

- OSU - Cooper recovered blocked punt in end zone (Stultz kick)
- PSU - Cerimele 1-yard run (two-point conversion failed)
- OSU - Montgomery 1-yard run (Stultz kick)

Fourth quarter

- No scoring
- Source: USA Today

=== Illinois ===
#1 Ohio State Buckeyes at Illinois Fighting Illini

Quarter	1	2	3	4	Total
Ohio State	10	14	0	17	41
Illinois	0	0	0	0	0

at Memorial Stadium, Champaign, Illinois

- Date: October 10, 1998
- Game time: 12:00 p.m. EST
- Game weather: 64°, Sunny, wind 7 SW
- Game attendance: 46,390
- Referee: J. Kemerling

Game information

First quarter

- OSU - Stultz 40 yard field goal
- OSU - Lumpkin 1 yard pass from Germaine (Stultz kick)

Second quarter

- OSU - Boston 30 yard pass from Germaine (Stultz kick)
- OSU - Germany 37 yard pass from Germaine (Stultz kick)

Third quarter

- No scoring

Fourth quarter

- OSU - Stultz 46 yard field goal
- OSU - Diggs 47 yard fumble return (Stultz kick)
- OSU - Wells 2 yard run (Stultz kick)
- OSU - Joe Germaine 17/28, 307 Yds (third straight 300+ yard passing game – school record)

=== Minnesota ===
Minnesota Golden Gophers at #1 Ohio State Buckeyes

Quarter	1	2	3	4	Total
Minnesota	3	10	0	2	15
Ohio State	14	17	7	7	45

at Ohio Stadium, Columbus, Ohio

- Date: October 17, 1998
- Game time: 12:00 p.m. EST
- Game weather: 70°, Sunny, wind 5-10 S
- Game attendance: 93,183
- Referee: D. Witvoet
- TV announcers (ESPN): Dave Barnett and Bill Curry

Game information
First quarter
- OSU - David Boston 6 yd pass from Joe Germaine (Dan Stultz kick)
- MIN - Adam Bailey 24 yd field goal
- OSU - Matt Keller 8 yd run (Dan Stultz kick)

Second quarter

- OSU - David Boston 53 yd pass from Joe Germaine (Dan Stultz kick)
- OSU - Joe Montgomery 12 yd run (Dan Stultz kick)
- OSU - Dan Stultz 19 yd field goal
- MIN - A. Henderson 35 yd pass from Andy Persby (Adam Bailey kick)
- MIN - Adam Bailey 32 yd field goal

Third quarter

- OSU - Michael Wiley 1 yd run (Dan Stultz kick)

Fourth quarter

- MIN - Team safety
- OSU - Central McClellion 60 yd interception return (Dan Stultz kick)

=== Northwestern ===
#1 Ohio State Buckeyes at Northwestern Wildcats

Quarter	1	2	3	4	Total
Ohio State	17	6	6	7	36
Northwestern	7	3	0	0	10

at Ryan Field, Evanston, Illinois

- Date: October 24, 1998
- Game time: 12:00 p.m. EST
- Game weather: 52°, Sunny, wind 9 SW
- Game attendance: 47,130
- Referee: J. Teitz

Game information
First quarter
- OSU - Michael Wiley 28 yd run (Dan Stultz kick)
- OSU - Dan Stultz 37 yd field goal
- NU - D'Wayne Bates 60 yd pass from Gavin Hoffman (Brian Gowins kick)
- OSU - Joe Montgomery 19 yd run (Dan Stultz kick)

Second quarter

- NU - Brian Gowins 39 yd field goal
- OSU - John Lumpkin 35 yd pass from Joe Germaine (Dan Stultz kick failed)

Third quarter

- OSU - David Boston 38 yd pass from Joe Germaine (pass failed)

Fourth quarter

- OSU - David Boston 31 yd pass from Joe Germaine (Dan Stultz kick)

=== Indiana ===
#1 Ohio State Buckeyes at Indiana Hoosiers

Quarter	1	2	3	4	Total
Ohio State	14	7	7	10	38
Indiana	0	7	0	0	7

at Memorial Stadium, Bloomington, Indiana

- Date: October 31, 1998
- Game time: 3:30 p.m. EST
- Game weather: 63°, Partly Cloudy, wind 10-15 NW
- Game attendance: 52,049
- Referee: J. Kemerling

Game information
First quarter
- OSU - David Boston 70 yd punt return (Dan Stultz kick)
- OSU - Michael Wiley 2 yd run (Dan Stultz kick)

Second quarter

- OSU - John Lumpkin 6 yd pass from Joe Germaine (Dan Stultz kick)
- IND - Levron Williams 37 yd pass from A. Randle El (Andy Payne kick)

Third quarter

- OSU - David Boston 3 yd pass from Joe Germaine (Dan Stultz kick)

Fourth quarter

- OSU - Dan Stultz 21 yd field goal
- OSU - David Boston 2 yd pass from Joe Germaine (Dan Stultz kick)

=== Michigan State ===
Michigan State Spartans at #1 Ohio State Buckeyes

Quarter	1	2	3	4	Total
Michigan State	3	6	9	10	28
Ohio State	17	0	7	0	24

at Ohio Stadium, Columbus, Ohio

- Date: November 7, 1998
- Game time: 3:30 p.m. EST
- Game weather: 48°, Clear, wind 5-10 W
- Game attendance: 93,595
- Referee: D. Witvoet

Game information
First quarter
- OSU - Dan Stultz 20 yd field goal
- MSU - Paul Edinger 33 yd field goal
- OSU - John Lumpkin 41 yd pass from Joe Germaine (Dan Stultz kick)
- OSU - Michael Wiley 1 yd run (Dan Stultz kick)

Second quarter

- MSU - Paul Edinger 43 yd field goal
- MSU - Paul Edinger 22 yd field goal

Third quarter

- OSU - Damon Moore 73 yd interception return (Dan Stultz kick)
- MSU - L. Richardson 23 yd pass from Bill Burke (Paul Edinger kick failed)
- MSU - Paul Edinger 49 yd field goal

Fourth quarter

- MSU - Sedrick Irvin 3 yd run (Paul Edinger kick)
- MSU - Paul Edinger 42 yd field goal

=== Iowa ===
#7 Ohio State Buckeyes at Iowa Hawkeyes

Quarter	1	2	3	4	Total
Ohio State	14	14	7	10	45
Iowa	7	7	0	0	14

at Kinnick Stadium, Iowa City, Iowa

- Date: November 14, 1998
- Game time: 3:30 p.m. EST
- Game weather: 61°, Clear wind 17-20 NW
- Game attendance: 69,473

Game information
First quarter
- IOWA - Scott Mullen 11 yd run (Zach Bromert kick)
- OSU - Joe Montgomery 80 yd run (Dan Stultz kick)
- OSU - David Boston 54 yd pass from Joe Germaine (Dan Stultz kick)

Second quarter

- OSU - Mike Collins 22 yd interception return (Dan Stultz kick)
- IOWA - Kyle McCann 13 yd run (Zach Bromert kick)
- OSU - David Boston 17 yd pass from Joe Germaine (Dan Stultz kick)

Third quarter

- OSU - Matt Keller 16 yd pass from Joe Germaine (Dan Stultz kick)

Fourth quarter

- OSU - Dan Stultz 27 yd field goal
- OSU - Jamar Martin 10 yd run (Dan Stultz kick)

=== Michigan ===
#11 Michigan Wolverines at #7 Ohio State Buckeyes

Quarter	1	2	3	4	Total
Michigan	0	10	3	3	16
Ohio State	14	7	10	0	31

at Ohio Stadium, Columbus, Ohio

- Date: November 21, 1998
- Game time: 12:00 p.m.
- Game weather: Cloudy, 38 °F (3 °C)
- Game attendance: 94,339
- Referee: Bill LeMonnier
- TV: ABC

Game information

First quarter

- OSU – Michael Wiley 53-yard run (Dan Stultz kick), 12:20. Ohio St 7–0. Drive: 4 plays, 69 yards, 1:18.
- OSU – Dee Miller 16-yard pass from Joe Germaine (Dan Stultz kick), 9:44. Ohio St 14–0. Drive: 3 plays, 16 yards, 1:33.

Second quarter

- MICH – Jay Feely 27-yard field goal, 14:33. Ohio St 14–3. Drive: 4 plays, 5 yards, 0:59.
- OSU – David Boston 30-yard pass from Joe Germaine (Dan Stultz kick), 4:03. Ohio St 21–3. Drive: 2 plays, 35 yards, 0:44.
- MICH – Tai Streets 3-yard pass from Tom Brady (Jay Feely kick), 0:25. Ohio St 21–10. Drive: 9 plays, 80 yards, 2:38.

Third quarter

- OSU - David Boston 43-yard pass from Joe Germaine (Dan Stultz kick), 9:51. Ohio St 28–10. Drive: 4 plays, 54 yards, 1:14.
- MICH – Jay Feely 34-yard field goal, 4:47. Ohio St 28–13. Drive: 9 plays, 27 yards, 4:50.
- OSU – Dan Stultz 39-yard field goal, 1:36. Ohio St 31–13. Drive: 6 plays, 58 yards, 3:06.

Fourth quarter

- MICH – Jay Feely 30-yard field goal, 14:47. Ohio St 31–16. Drive: 10 plays, 68 yards, 1:41.

Top passers

- MICH – Tom Brady – 31/56, 375 yards, TD, 2 INT
- OSU – Joe Germaine – 16/28, 330 yards, 3 TD

Top rushers

- MICH – Clarence Williams – 11 rushes, 13 yards
- OSU – Michael Wiley – 12 rushes, 120 yards, TD

Top receivers

- MICH – Tai Streets – 9 receptions, 118 yards, TD
- OSU – David Boston – 10 receptions, 217 yards, 2 TD

Ohio State secured a share of its 28th Big Ten title as the fans stormed the field with less than 30 seconds to play. Joe Germaine completed 19-of-24 passes for 330 yards, his seventh career 300-yard game, and his favorite target was David Boston, who finished with 10 receptions for 217 yards, most ever by a Michigan opponent. Boston also broke his own single-season reception mark and moved past Cris Carter on the school's all-time yardage list.

=== Texas A&M ===
#8 Texas A&M Aggies vs. #3 Ohio State Buckeyes

Quarter	1	2	3	4	Total
Texas A&M	7	0	7	0	14
Ohio State	21	3	0	0	24

at Louisiana Superdome, New Orleans, Louisiana

- Date: January 1, 1999
- Game time: 7:30 p.m. EST
- Game weather: None (indoors)
- Game attendance: 76,502
- Referee: A. Ford

Game information
First quarter
- A&M - Dante Hall, 9 yard run (Russell Bynum kick)
- OSU - Reggie Germany, 18 yard pass from Joe Germaine (Dan Stultz kick)
- OSU - Joe Montgomery, 10 yard run (Dan Stultz kick)
- OSU - Kevin Griffin 16 yard blocked punt return/block punt by Derek Ross/(Dan Stultz kick)

Second quarter

- OSU - Dan Stultz, 31 yard field goal

Third quarter

- A&M - Leroy Hodge, 7 yard pass from Branndon Stewart (Russel Bynum kick)

Fourth quarter

- No scoring

== Personnel ==
=== Coaching staff ===
- John Cooper, head coach (11th year)
- Bill Conley, tight ends, recruiting coordinator (12th year)
- Jim Heacock, defensive tackles (3rd year)
- Mike Jacobs, offensive coordinator, offensive line (4th year)
- Fred Pagac, defensive coordinator, linebackers (17th year)
- Tim Salem, quarterbacks (2nd year)
- Shawn Simms, defensive ends (2nd year)
- Tim Spencer, running backs (5th year)
- Chuck Stobart, wide receivers (4th year)
- Jon Tenuta, defensive backs (3rd year)

=== Roster ===
1998 Ohio State Buckeyes football team roster
Players
Coaches
Offense

Pos.	#	Name	Class
QB	8	Steve Bellisari	Fr
C	68	LeCharles Bentley	Fr
QB	7	Joe Germaine	Sr
C	77	Tyson Walter	Fr
RB	5	Michael Wiley	Jr
WR	9	David Boston	Jr

Defense

Pos.	#	Name	Class
S	1	Gary Berry	Jr
DT	73	Joe Brown	So
LB	32	Na'il Diggs	Jr
LB	45	Andy Katzenmoyer	Jr
SS	13	Damon Moore	Sr
CB	19	Ahmed Plummer	Jr
CB	11	Antoine Winfield	Sr

Special teams

Pos.	#	Name	Class

Head coach

- John Cooper

Coordinators/assistant coaches

Legend

- (C) Team captain
- (S) Suspended
- (I) Ineligible
- Injured
- Redshirt

Roster

=== Depth chart ===
Defense

FS
1 Gary Berry
17 Percy King

WLB	MLB	SLB
35 Jerry Rudzinski	45 Andy Katzenmoyer	32 Na'il Diggs
30 Jason Ott	44 Chris Kirk	58 Courtland Bullard

SS
13 Damon Moore
20 Central McClellion

CB
11 Antoine Winfield
3 David Mitchell

DE	DT	DT	DE
60 Brent Johnson	73 Joe Brown	79 Ryan Pickett	94 Rodney Bailey
52 James Cotton	98 Mike Collins	90 Clinton Wayne	48 Matt LaVrar

CB
19 Ahmed Plummer
2 Rolland Steele

Offense

SE
9 David Boston
80 Reggie Germany

LT	LG	C	RG	RT
77 Tyson Walter	56 Rob Murphy	63 Kurt Murphy	64 Ben Gilbert	67 Brooks Burris
69 Jim Massey	65 Mike Gurr	78 Drew Elford	55 Tam Hopkins	75 Henry Fleming

TE
85 John Lumpkin
84 Steve Wisniewski

FL
15 Dee Miller
4 Ken-Yon Rambo

QB
7 Joe Germaine
16 Mark Garcia

Key reserves
8 Steve Bellisari (Fr) Special Teams/DB/QB

FB
23 Matt Keller
36 Sean Penny

Special teams
PK 47 Dan Stultz
P 41 Brent Bartholomew

RB
5 Michael Wiley
33 Joe Montgomery

== 1999 NFL draftees ==
Player	Round	Pick	Position	NFL club
David Boston	1	8	Wide receiver	Arizona Cardinals
Antoine Winfield	1	23	Defensive back	Buffalo Bills
Andy Katzenmoyer	1	28	Linebacker	New England Patriots
Joe Montgomery	2	49	Running back	New York Giants
Joe Germaine	4	101	Quarterback	St. Louis Rams
Damon Moore	4	128	Defensive back	Philadelphia Eagles
Brent Bartholomew	6	192	Punter	Miami Dolphins
Dee Miller	6	196	Wide Receiver	Green Bay Packers
