= Ikechi =

Ikechi is a Nigerian masculine given name that may refer to

- Ikechi Anya (born 1988), Scottish football midfielder
- Ikechi Ariguzo (born 1992), American football linebacker
- Ikechi Nwosu, Anglican bishop in Nigeria
- Ikechi Uko (born 1964), Nigerian travel consultant and journalist
