= Charles Hickey =

Charles Hickey may refer to:

- Charles Hickey (RAF officer) (1897–1918), Canadian World War I flying ace
- Charles Hickey (cricketer) (1880–1919), New Zealand cricketer
- Charles A. Hickey (1874–1929), American football coach
- Charles Erastus Hickey (1840–1908), physician and political figure in Ontario, Canada
- Charlie Hickey (coach) (born 1964), American college baseball coach
- Charlie Hickey (musician) (born 1999), American indie rock musician
