= Chris Stoll =

American football player (born 1998)

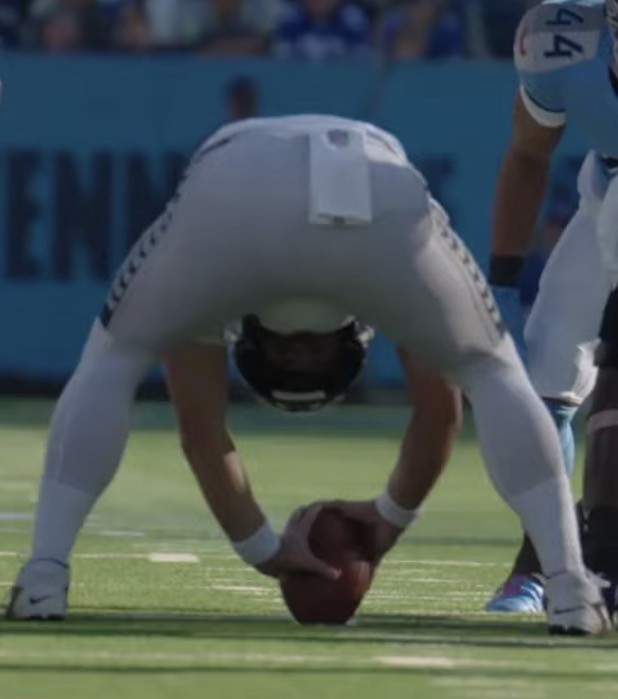
- Stoll with the Seattle Seahawks in 2025

No. 41 – Seattle Seahawks
- Position: Long snapper
- Roster status: Active

Personal information
- Born: August 3, 1998 (age 28); Westerville, Ohio, U.S.
- Listed height: 6 ft 3 in (1.91 m)
- Listed weight: 255 lb (116 kg)

Career information
- High school: St. Francis DeSales (Columbus, Ohio)
- College: Penn State (2017–2022)
- NFL draft: 2023: undrafted

Career history
- Seattle Seahawks (2023–present)

Awards and highlights
- Super Bowl champion (LX); Patrick Mannelly Award (2023)

Career NFL statistics as of Week 8, 2026
- Games played: 59
- Total tackles: 2
- Stats at Pro Football Reference

Christopher Michael Stoll (born August 3, 1998) is an American professional football long snapper for the Seattle Seahawks of the National Football League (NFL). He played college football for the Penn State Nittany Lions and was signed as an undrafted free agent by the Seahawks after the 2023 NFL draft.

== Early life ==
Stoll grew up in Westerville, Ohio and attended St. Francis DeSales High School. In high school, he was named a two-time Prokicker.com All-American long snapper selection, in his junior and senior years. Besides playing football, he also played lacrosse, hockey, and basketball. He decided to join Penn State as a preferred walk-on.

== College career ==
Stoll played at Penn State for six years. In his first two years, he did not receive any playing time due to being redshirted and being a backup. In the 2019 season, Stoll played in 13 games while recording three tackles. Before the start of the 2020 season, Stoll was awarded a scholarship by the Nittany Lions. Stoll played in nine games during the 2020 season. During the 2021 season, he played in 13 games, being nominated for the Burlsworth Trophy. At the start of the 2022 season, Stoll was named to the Patrick Mannelly Award watchlist and was named a team captain. He appeared in all 13 games on the year, and was given the Patrick Mannelly Award for best long snapper nationally. Stoll accepted an invite to play in the Hula Bowl.

== Professional career ==
Pre-draft measurables
Height	Weight	Arm length	Hand span	Wingspan	40-yard dash	10-yard split	20-yard split	Bench press
6 ft 2 7/8 in (1.90 m)	255 lb (116 kg)	30 7/8 in (0.78 m)	9 in (0.23 m)	6 ft 4 5/8 in (1.95 m)	4.92 s	1.76 s	2.82 s	11 reps
All values from Pro Day

After not being selected in the 2023 NFL draft, Stoll signed with the Seattle Seahawks as an undrafted free agent. On August 29, 2023, the Seahawks announced that he had made the initial 53-man roster.

On March 23, 2026, Stoll re-signed with the Seahawks on a two-year, $2.91 million contract.
