= St. Francis DeSales High School (Columbus, Ohio) =

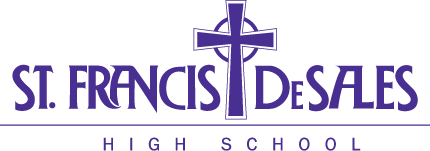

Location
- 4212 Karl Road; Columbus, Franklin, Ohio 43224; United States; 40°3′11″N 82°58′29″W

Information
- Type: Private, Coeducational
- Motto: Faith. Family. Tradition.
- Religious affiliation: Roman Catholic
- Established: 1960
- Founder: Monsignor James M. Berendt
- Oversight: Roman Catholic Diocese of Columbus
- Administrator: Robert Dvorak
- Principal: Dan Garrick
- Grades: 9–12
- Student to teacher ratio: 17:1
- Colors: Purple and White
- Slogan: Empowering Students for Life
- Athletics conference: Central Catholic League
- Team name: Stallions
- Rivals: •Bishop Watterson Eagles •Bishop Hartley Hawks •St.Charles Cardinals
- Publication: The Mighty Pen
- Newspaper: The Quill
- Website: http://www.sfdstallions.org

St. Francis DeSales High School is located in Columbus, Ohio, United States and is part of the Catholic Diocese of Columbus. The school has an enrollment of over 875 students, in four grade levels.

== Location ==
St. Francis DeSales High School is located on the north side of Columbus, Ohio. Students come from the Columbus Public School District and suburban school districts: Big Walnut, Delaware, Gahanna Jefferson, Lewis Center, New Albany-Plain Local, Olentangy, Westerville and Worthington.

== History ==
St. Francis DeSales High School was originally founded in 1960, using borrowed classrooms from both St. Augustine and St. James the Less schools. During September 1962, the school earned a permanent home. It had ten sisters from St. Francis of Stella in Niagara, New York, four priests, and eight lay people. It opened with a registered student number of 523.

== Awards ==
St. Francis DeSales High School is the recipient of two Blue Ribbon Awards of Excellence in Education.

== Extracurriculars ==
Since 2021, catechesis at the school has been facilitated by Salesian Sisters of Don Bosco.

== Athletics ==
=== Ohio High School Athletic Association State Championships ===
- Football - 1985, 1997, 1998
- Wrestling - 1971, 1974, 1977
- Boys Basketball – 1987
- Baseball - 1979, 2011, 2012
- Boys Soccer - 1986, 1992, 1997, 2009, 2014, 2015, 2017
- Girls Soccer - 1995, 1997, 1998, 2011
- Girls Volleyball - 1982, 2019
- Boys Volleyball - 2023
- Boys Gymnastics - 1990, 1991, 1992, 1993
- Boys Lacrosse - 2012, 2018, 2022, 2024
- Girls Lacrosse - 2016, 2019, 2024, 2025, 2026

== Notable alumni/staff ==
- Ikechi Ariguzo, former NFL player
- Brian Asamoah, NFL Player
- Gary Berry, former NFL player
- Tim Bezbatchenko, former President of the Columbus Crew
- Antonio Daniels, former NBA player
- Matt D'Orazio, former AFL player
- Luke Fickell, head football coach at University of Wisconsin, former co-defensive coordinator for Ohio State
- Paul Haynes, Defensive backs coach at Michigan State Spartans football
- John Holgado, bass guitarist for post-hardcore band Attack Attack!
- Patrick Omameh, professional football player
- Matt Stewart, former NFL player
- Blaine Wilson, Olympic silver medalist in gymnastics
- Chris Stoll, NFL Player
