= John Cooper (American football) =

American football player and coach (born 1937)

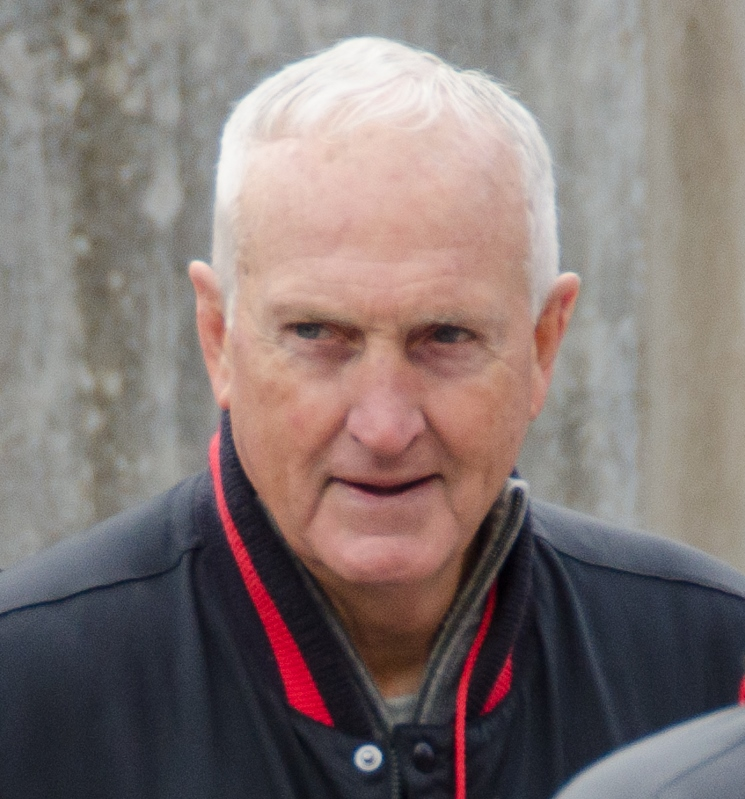
- Cooper at the 2014 Michigan–Ohio State rivalry game

Biographical details
- Born: July 2, 1937 (age 89); Powell, Tennessee, U.S.

Playing career
- 1959–1961: Iowa State
- Positions: Running back, defensive back

Coaching career (HC unless noted)
- 1962: Iowa State (freshmen)
- 1963–1964: Oregon State (assistant)
- 1965–1966: UCLA (assistant)
- 1967–1971: Kansas (DC)
- 1972–1976: Kentucky (assistant)
- 1977–1984: Tulsa
- 1985–1987: Arizona State
- 1988–2000: Ohio State

Administrative career (AD unless noted)
- 1981–1985: Tulsa

Head coaching record
- Overall: 192–84–6
- Bowls: 5–9

Accomplishments and honors

Championships
- 5 MVC (1980–1984); Pac-10 (1986); 3 Big Ten (1993, 1996, 1998)

Awards
- Sporting News College Football COY (1986); Pac-10 Coach of the Year (1986); Rose Bowl Hall of Fame (2012)
- College Football Hall of Fame; Inducted in 2008 (profile)

John Harold Cooper (born July 2, 1937) is an American former college football coach and player. Cooper was an assistant coach at Iowa State, Oregon State, UCLA, Kansas, and Kentucky. Then, he embarked on a head coaching career, as he served as the head coach at the University of Tulsa (1977–1984), Arizona State University (1985–1987), and Ohio State University (1988–2000), compiling a career record of 192–84–6.

== Early life and playing career ==
Cooper was born and raised in the Knoxville suburb of Powell, Tennessee. He graduated from Powell High School in 1955, then served in the United States Army for two years. After serving for two years, he enrolled at Iowa State University, where he played football for legendary coach Clay Stapleton in the single-wing formation with the Iowa State Cyclones, including the 1959 "Dirty 30" team. As a senior in 1961, Cooper was team captain and MVP. Cooper graduated from Iowa State in 1962 with a bachelor's degree in physical education.

== Coaching career ==
Cooper began his coaching career in 1962 as the freshmen team coach at Iowa State. He then was an assistant coach at Oregon State from 1963 to 1964 under Tommy Prothro and helped Oregon State finish first place in the Athletic Association of Western Universities (AAWU) in 1964. Oregon State also made the Rose Bowl and finished #8 in the final AP Poll. Cooper then followed Prothro to UCLA to be an assistant there from 1965 to 1966. In the 1965 season, UCLA finished first in the AAWU and #4 in the final AP Poll and won the Rose Bowl. The 1966 UCLA team finished #5 in the AP Poll.

In 1967, Cooper became defensive coordinator at Kansas under Pepper Rodgers. Cooper again was part of a conference championship team in 1968 when Kansas finished first in the Big 8. The 1968 Kansas team finished #9 in the final AP Poll and made the Orange Bowl. Cooper remained at Kansas until 1971. From 1972 to 1976, Cooper had his final assistant position at Kentucky, first under John Ray in 1972 then Fran Curci from 1973 to 1976. In Cooper's final season at Kentucky in 1976, Kentucky finished #18 in the AP Poll and won the Peach Bowl.

In 1977, he was named the head football coach at the University of Tulsa. At Tulsa, he compiled a 56–32 record with five Missouri Valley Conference titles. Cooper considers his tenure at Tulsa his "most enjoyable years as a coach". He became the head coach at Arizona State in 1985 where his teams played in three consecutive bowl games, including the 1987 Rose Bowl, during his three-year tenure. His record was 0–2–1 against arch-rival Arizona. He accepted the job as head coach at Ohio State on December 31, 1987.

Cooper's first season in Columbus was undistinguished; the Buckeyes notched their first losing season since 1966. However, he quickly turned the Buckeyes around and led them to shared Big Ten titles in 1993, 1996, and 1998. In his 13 seasons at Ohio State, Cooper compiled a 111–43–4 record; his 111 victories are second in Ohio State history behind only Woody Hayes's 205. Among his most memorable victories at Ohio State were back-to-back victories against Notre Dame (1995 and 1996), leading Ohio State to its first Rose Bowl in 13 years (the 1997 Rose Bowl—a win over Arizona State), and a 1999 Sugar Bowl victory over Texas A&M. Cooper's teams at Ohio State were loaded with a great deal of talent that would go on to play in the NFL, including: 1995 Heisman Trophy winner Eddie George, 1995 Fred Biletnikoff Award winner Terry Glenn, 1996 Outland Trophy winner Orlando Pace, 1997 Butkus Award winner Andy Katzenmoyer, 1998 Jim Thorpe Award winner Antoine Winfield, as well as Alonzo Spellman, Robert Smith, Dan Wilkinson, Joey Galloway, Rickey Dudley, Mike Vrabel, Korey Stringer, David Boston, Shawn Springs, Ahmed Plummer, Na'il Diggs, Nate Clements, and Ryan Pickett.

However, Cooper has also been remembered for his 3–8 bowl record and his 2–10–1 record against archrival Michigan. His most disappointing losses to the Wolverines came in 1993, 1995, and 1996. In each season of those seasons, Ohio State entered the Michigan game undefeated and ranked in the top five, but was upset by the Wolverines on each occasion; two of those losses cost the Buckeyes a Rose Bowl bid. In 1993 Ohio State was ranked #5 and undefeated, needing only to beat Michigan to get its first trip to Pasadena in nine years. However, the Buckeyes were shut out by the unranked Wolverines 28–0 in Ann Arbor. In 1995 Ohio State lost a #2 ranking, the Big Ten title, and another shot at the Rose Bowl by losing to the #18 ranked Wolverines, 31–23, in Ann Arbor. In 1996, the Buckeyes were again ranked #2 and had already secured a Rose Bowl berth when they faced #21 ranked Michigan, this time in Columbus. The Buckeyes smelled victory after shutting out the Wolverines in the first half, but Michigan rallied in the second half to upset the Buckeyes yet again, 13–9, costing them a chance at the national championship. Ohio State would go on to win the 1997 Rose Bowl against Arizona State and finish the season ranked #2. With this victory, Cooper became the first coach to win the Rose Bowl with a Pac-10 and a Big Ten team.

In 1997, top-ranked Michigan entered the game undefeated and #4 Ohio State had the opportunity to spoil Michigan's perfect season; however, the Wolverines again defeated the Buckeyes, 20–14. To add insult to injury, Michigan's win was highlighted by the performance of Ohio native and 1997 Heisman Trophy winner Charles Woodson, who made game changing plays on offense, defense, and special teams.

In 1998, Ohio State was 8–0 and ranked #1 in the country but was upset by Michigan State, 28–24. The team did go on to beat Michigan that season and won the Sugar Bowl over Texas A&M, 24–14, eventually finishing #2 in the polls.

Cooper's Buckeyes were expected to have a strong season in 1999, but slumped to 6–6, their first non-winning record since Cooper's first year and only their third since 1947. They rebounded to 8–4 a year later, but a 38–26 loss to Michigan cost Cooper his job at the end of the season. He was the first non-interim Buckeye head coach since Wes Fesler, Hayes' predecessor, to have left Ohio State without winning an outright Big Ten title.

== Later life and honors ==
Cooper currently works for the Cincinnati Bengals of the NFL as a scouting consultant and also works as a college football analyst for ESPN.

On May 1, 2008, Cooper was elected to the College Football Hall of Fame. He was inducted into the Rose Bowl Hall of Fame on December 30, 2012, representing both Arizona State and Ohio State football teams. On September 8, 2014, Cooper was inducted into the Iowa State University Athletics Hall of Fame in an on-field ceremony during the Iowa State-Kansas State football game.

== Head coaching record ==
Year	Team	Overall	Conference	Standing	Bowl/playoffs	Coaches^{#}	AP^{°}
Tulsa Golden Hurricane (Missouri Valley Conference) (1977–1985)
1977	Tulsa	3–8	2–3	T–4th			
1978	Tulsa	9–2	4–1	2nd			
1979	Tulsa	6–5	0–0	NA			
1980	Tulsa	8–3	4–1	1st			
1981	Tulsa	6–5	5–1	T–1st			
1982	Tulsa	10–1	6–0	1st			
1983	Tulsa	8–3	5–0	1st			
1984	Tulsa	6–5	5–0	1st			
Tulsa:		56–32	31–6				
Arizona State Sun Devils (Pacific-10 Conference) (1985–1987)
1985	Arizona State	8–4	5–2	T–2nd	L Holiday		
1986	Arizona State	10–1–1	5–1–1	1st	W Rose	5	4
1987	Arizona State	7–4–1	3–3–1	6th	W Freedom		20
Arizona State:		25–9–2	13–6–2				
Ohio State Buckeyes (Big Ten Conference) (1988–2000)
1988	Ohio State	4–6–1	2–5–1	T–7th			
1989	Ohio State	8–4	6–2	T–3rd	L Hall of Fame		21
1990	Ohio State	7–4–1	5–2–1	5th	L Liberty		
1991	Ohio State	8–4	5–3	T–3rd	L Hall of Fame		
1992	Ohio State	8–3–1	5–2–1	2nd	L Florida Citrus	19	18
1993	Ohio State	10–1–1	6–1–1	T–1st	W Holiday	10	11
1994	Ohio State	9–4	6–2	2nd	L Florida Citrus	9	14
1995	Ohio State	11–2	7–1	2nd	L Florida Citrus	8	6
1996	Ohio State	11–1	7–1	T–1st	W Rose	2	2
1997	Ohio State	10–3	6–2	T–2nd	L Sugar^{†}	12	12
1998	Ohio State	11–1	7–1	T–1st	W Sugar^{†}	2	2
1999	Ohio State	6–6	3–5	T–8th			
2000	Ohio State	8–4	5–3	4th	L Outback		
Ohio State:		111–43–4	70–30–4				
Total:		192–84–6					
National championship Conference title Conference division title or championship game berth
^{†}Indicates Bowl Alliance or BCS bowl.; ^{#}Rankings from final Coaches Poll.; ^{°}Rankings from final AP Poll.

== See also ==
- Legends Poll
- List of presidents of the American Football Coaches Association
