= Michael Wiley (running back, born 1978) =

American football player (born 1978)

No. 32
- Position: Running back

Personal information
- Born: January 5, 1978 (age 48); Spring Valley, California, U.S.
- Listed height: 5 ft 11 in (1.80 m)
- Listed weight: 203 lb (92 kg)

Career information
- High school: Monte Vista (Spring Valley)
- College: Ohio State
- NFL draft: 2000: 5th round, 144th overall pick

Career history
- Dallas Cowboys (2000–2002)

Awards and highlights
- First-team All-Big Ten (1998); Second-team All-Big Ten (1999)

Career NFL statistics
- Games played: 42
- Rushing yards: 503
- Rushing average: 6.3
- Touchdowns: 3
- Stats at Pro Football Reference

Michael Deshawn Wiley (born January 5, 1978) is an American former professional football player who was a running back for the Dallas Cowboys of the National Football League (NFL). He played college football for the Ohio State Buckeyes.

== Early life ==
Wiley attended Monte Vista High School, where as a senior he ran for 1,901 yards and 23 touchdowns, en route to being named a high school All-America and ranking as the country's No. 2 running back prospect according to Bluechip Illustrated. He finished his high school career with 3,417 rushing yards and 38 touchdowns. He also practiced track and basketball.

He accepted a football scholarship from Ohio State University. Although he never played the position before, as a true freshman he appeared in 8 games as a backup wide receiver and was also a reserve at running back in 4 games, registering 23 carries for 176 yards and 6 receptions for 194 yards. He scored touchdowns the first three times he touched the ball as a collegian, while playing against Rice in 1996 (a 49-yard reverse run and receptions of 51 and 60 yards).

As a sophomore, he had 588 rushing yards, a 5.6-yard average and 6 touchdowns. He also had a 26.6-yard average in kickoff returns, including a 100-yard kickoff return for a touchdown against Bowling Green State University. He rushed for 121 yards against Wyoming and had an 8-yard touchdown pass against Indiana.

As a junior, he earned the starter tailback job, rushing for 1,258 yards (second in the conference) on 198 carries for a 6.2-yard average and 10 touchdowns. He also had 26 receptions (third on the team) for 200 yards and 6 kickoffs returns for a 23.8-yard average. He had a 209-yard rushing performance (10th best in school history) in a win over Missouri. The team finished 11-1 and beat Texas A&M in the Sugar Bowl.

As a senior, he posted 183 carries for 952 rushing yards (led the team) and 10 touchdowns. He also completed all 5 of his passing attempts for 123 yards and one touchdown, while adding 14 catches (third on the team) for 153 yards and one touchdown. He was the team's all-purpose yardage leader with an average of 101.6 yards-per-game.

Though he was only a two-year starter (22 starts), he finished a distinguished playing career after recording 509 carries for 2,951 rushing yards (seventh in school history), 3,176 total offense yards, 4,194 all-purpose yards (seventh in school history), ten 100-yard games, 56 receptions and 35 touchdowns. He also completed 10-of-11 pass attempts for 225 yards and 2 touchdowns.

== Professional career ==
Pre-draft measurables
Height	Weight
5 ft 10 3/4 in (1.80 m)	193 lb (88 kg)
Values from NFL Combine

Wiley was selected by the Dallas Cowboys in the fifth round (144th overall) of the 2000 NFL draft. Because of his versatility, he was selected with the plan of converting him into a slot wide receiver. The experiment didn't last long and he was named the third-string running back in December, after the release of Chris Warren. He appeared in 10 games, registering 24 carries for 88 yards, 14 receptions for 72 yards, one touchdown, 13 kickoff returns for 303 yards (23.3 yard avg.) and 7 special teams tackles.

In 2001, he was involved 30 times on third down and picked up a first down on 14 of those chances (46.7% conversion rate). He finished with 34 carries for 247 rushing yards (7.3 avg.) and 16 receptions for 99 yards, one touchdown and 4 special teams tackles.

In 2002, he missed most of preseason with a sprained right ankle. He continued as the team's third-down back, averaging 8.9 yards from scrimmage every time he touched the football. In all, he had 35 plays from scrimmage, recording 22 carries for 168 yards (7.6 yard avg.) and 13 receptions for 144 yards (11.1 yard avg.). On special teams, he contributed on both coverage and return teams, making 9 tackles.

During his NFL career, he battled with injuries at different times. In 2003, after the Cowboys hired new head coach Bill Parcells, Wiley missed valuable preseason time with a rotator cuff injury. On August 25, he was waived after being passed for the third-down back role by Aveion Cason.

== NFL career statistics ==
Legend
**Bold**	Career high

Year	Team	Games		Rushing					Receiving				
Year	Team	GP	GS	Att	Yds	Avg	Lng	TD	Rec	Yds	Avg	Lng	TD
2000	DAL	10	0	24	88	3.7	11	0	14	72	5.1	15	**1**
2001	DAL	**16**	0	**34**	**247**	7.3	**58**	0	**16**	99	6.2	17	**1**
2002	DAL	**16**	**1**	22	168	**7.6**	46	**1**	13	**144**	**11.1**	**31**	0
		42	1	80	503	6.3	58	1	43	315	7.3	31	2

== Personal life ==
Since his retirement from professional football, Wiley has been active in the Ohio Democratic Party. He also has two kids, a daughter, and a son.
