= Joe Brown (American football) =

American football player (born 1977)

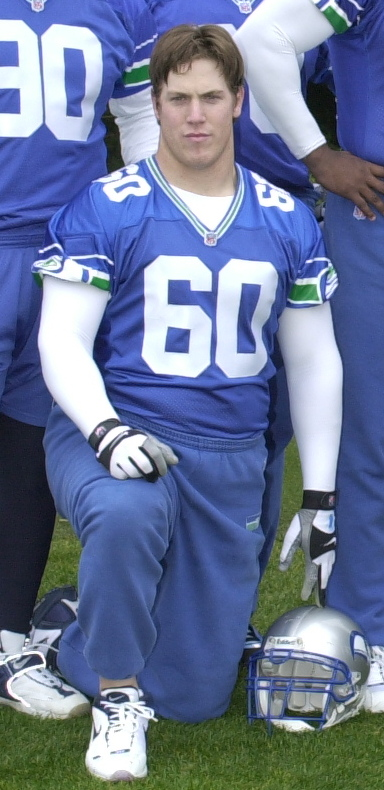

No. 60
- Position: Defensive tackle

Personal information
- Born: March 5, 1977 (age 49); Columbus, Ohio
- Listed height: 6 ft 6 in (1.98 m)
- Listed weight: 288 lb (131 kg)

Career information
- High school: Catalina Foothills (Tucson, Arizona)
- College: Ohio State
- NFL draft: 2001: undrafted

Career history
- Seattle Seahawks (2001-2002)
- Stats at Pro Football Reference

Joe Brown (born March 5, 1977) is an American former football defensive tackle who played for the Seattle Seahawks of the National Football League (NFL). He played college football at Ohio State University.
