= Ikechi Ariguzo =

American football player (born 1992)

Chi Chi Ariguzo
Profile
- Position: Linebacker

Personal information
- Born: June 23, 1992 (age 34); Columbus, Ohio
- Listed height: 6 ft 1 in (1.85 m)
- Listed weight: 235 lb (107 kg)

Career information
- High school: St. Francis DeSales (Columbus, OH)
- College: Northwestern
- NFL draft: 2015: undrafted

Career history
- San Diego Chargers (2015); Detroit Lions (2016)*
- * Offseason or practice squad member only
- Stats at Pro Football Reference

Ikechi "Chi Chi" Ariguzo is an American former professional football player who was a linebacker in the National Football League (NFL). He played college football at Northwestern University. He signed with the San Diego Chargers as an undrafted free agent in 2015.

== Professional career ==
=== San Diego Chargers ===
After going unselected in the 2015 NFL draft, Ariguzo signed with the San Diego Chargers on May 3, 2015. On September 5, 2015, he was waived. On March 3, 2016, Ariguzo was released.

=== Detroit Lions ===
On August 5, 2016, Ariguzo signed with the Detroit Lions. On September 1, 2016, Ariguzo was waived by the Lions.
