= Gary Berry =

American football player (born 1977)

No. 21
- Position: Safety

Personal information
- Born: October 24, 1977 (age 49); Worthington, Ohio, U.S.
- Listed height: 5 ft 11 in (1.80 m)
- Listed weight: 193 lb (88 kg)

Career information
- High school: St. Francis DeSales (Columbus, Ohio)
- College: Ohio State (1996–1999)
- NFL draft: 2000: 4th round, 126th overall pick

Career history
- Green Bay Packers (2000)
- Stats at Pro Football Reference

Gary John Berry II (born October 24, 1977) is an American former professional football safety who played for the Green Bay Packers of the National Football League (NFL).

== Early life and college ==
Gary John Berry II was born on October 24, 1977, in Worthington, Ohio. He attended Thomas Worthington High School in Worthington, and St. Francis DeSales High School in Columbus, Ohio.

He played at the collegiate level at the Ohio State University from 1996 to 1999 and was a four-year letterman.

== Professional career ==
Berry was selected by the Green Bay Packers in the fourth round, with the 126th overall pick, of the 2000 NFL draft. He officially signed with the team on July 18. He played in four games for the Packers, returning one kick for 22 yards, before being placed on injured reserve on October 31, 2000. Berry was waived on June 5, 2001.
