= David Boston =

American gridiron football player (born 1978)

No. 89, 80
- Position: Wide receiver

Personal information
- Born: August 19, 1978 (age 48); Humble, Texas, U.S.
- Listed height: 6 ft 2 in (1.88 m)
- Listed weight: 228 lb (103 kg)

Career information
- High school: Humble
- College: Ohio State (1996–1998)
- NFL draft: 1999: 1st round, 8th overall pick

Career history
- Arizona Cardinals (1999–2002); San Diego Chargers (2003); Miami Dolphins (2004–2005); Tampa Bay Buccaneers (2006–2007); Toronto Argonauts (2008)

Awards and highlights
- First-team All-Pro (2001); Pro Bowl (2001); NFL receiving yards leader (2001); First-team All-American (1998); 2× First-team All-Big Ten (1997, 1998)

Career NFL statistics
- Receptions: 315
- Receiving yards: 4,699
- Receiving touchdowns: 25
- Stats at Pro Football Reference

David Byron Boston (born August 19, 1978) is an American former professional football player who was a wide receiver in the National Football League (NFL). He played college football for the Ohio State Buckeyes, earning first-team All-American honors in 1998. Selected by the Arizona Cardinals with the eighth overall pick in the 1999 NFL draft, Boston became a Pro Bowl selection with the Cardinals in 2001. He also played for the San Diego Chargers, Miami Dolphins, and Tampa Bay Buccaneers.

== Early life ==
Boston was born in Humble, Texas, and played youth football in the Humble Area Football League.

== College career ==
Boston became a three-year starter for the Ohio State Buckeyes (1996–98). He set several Ohio State receiving records during that time. His 191 pass receptions as a Buckeye was a record and is now the third most in school history (Emeka Egbuka, 2024; K. J. Hill, 2019). His 2,855 career receiving yards and 1,435 single-season receiving yards were school records until surpassed by Michael Jenkins in 2003 and Jaxon Smith-Njigba in 2021. With 34 career touchdown receptions (and one two-point conversion), Boston averaged 5.89 points per game. Additionally, he held the school touchdown reception record until Chris Olave surpassed it in 2021.

Boston's best moment was his 5 yard touchdown catch from Joe Germaine with 19 seconds remaining in the 1997 Rose Bowl.

== Professional career ==
Pre-draft measurables
Height	Weight	Arm length	Hand span	40-yard dash	10-yard split	20-yard split	20-yard shuttle	Three-cone drill	Vertical jump	Broad jump
6 ft 1 1/4 in (1.86 m)	215 lb (98 kg)	32 1/4 in (0.82 m)	8 1/2 in (0.22 m)	4.32 s	1.56 s	2.52 s	4.09 s	7.20 s	37 in (0.94 m)	9 ft 8 in (2.95 m)
All values from NFL Combine

=== Arizona Cardinals ===
Boston left Ohio State with a year of eligibility remaining, and was selected with the eighth overall pick in the first round of the 1999 NFL draft by the Arizona Cardinals. In 2000, David was an alternate selection for the Pro Bowl. In 2001, Boston had 98 receptions for a league-leading 1598 yards and eight touchdowns, starting in the Pro Bowl and earning All-Pro honors.

=== San Diego Chargers ===
Boston signed a seven-year, $47 million contract ($12 million guaranteed) with the San Diego Chargers in 2003. That season, he caught 70 passes for 880 yards and seven touchdowns, though head coach Marty Schottenheimer suspended him for a game after he cursed out strength coach Dave Redding. Chargers GM A. J. Smith traded Boston to the Miami Dolphins for a sixth round draft choice.

=== Miami Dolphins ===
Before the 2004 season, Boston tested positive for a minor HCG infraction and was ordered to serve a four-game suspension. The suspension became moot after he tore ligaments in his knee and was unable to play for the entire season. The Dolphins cut him at the end of the year, then proceeded to re-sign him for the veterans' minimum in 2005 for $700,000. He played in five games that year before tearing knee ligaments again.

=== Tampa Bay Buccaneers ===
In 2006, Boston signed with the Tampa Bay Buccaneers. He was released by the team on September 12, 2007, after being injured.

=== Toronto Argonauts ===
After spending the 2007 season out of football, Boston signed with the Toronto Argonauts of the Canadian Football League on April 21, 2008. Boston reported to training camp but his medical report showed a stress fracture in his right foot and recommended surgery. He was placed on the suspended list, never practicing or playing in the pre-season. A second doctor's opinion, however, was that it was a two-year-old injury and cleared him to play in the regular season opener on June 27, 2008, when he recorded two receptions for a total of 16 yards. Following the game, however, Boston reported feeling too much pain and opted to follow the original doctor's suggestion of surgery requiring a 10 to 12 weeks rehabilitation period. He never played another down of pro football.

== Career statistics ==
=== NFL ===
Legend
	Led the league
**Bold**	Career high

Year	Team	Games		Receiving							Fumbles	
Year	Team	GP	GS	Tgt	Rec	Yds	Avg	Lng	TD	FD	Fum	Lost
1999	ARI	**16**	8	82	40	473	11.8	43	2	21	1	0
2000	ARI	**16**	**16**	133	71	1,156	16.3	**70**	7	48	1	0
2001	ARI	**16**	15	**175**	**98**	**1,598**	16.3	61	**8**	**72**	1	1
2002	ARI	8	8	75	32	512	16.0	34	1	28	0	0
2003	SD	14	14	115	70	880	12.6	46	**7**	42	2	2
2005	MIA	5	0	10	4	80	**20.0**	54	0	2	0	0
Career		75	61	590	315	4,699	14.9	70	25	213	5	3

=== College ===
			Receiving		
Year	Team	GP	Rec	Yards	TDs
1996	Ohio State	12	33	450	7
1997	Ohio State	13	73	970	14
1998	Ohio State	12	85	1,435	13
**College totals**		**37**	**191**	**2,855**	**34**

== Personal life ==
Boston's father, Byron, is an American football official in the NFL. He was not permitted to officiate regular season games in which David played. Byron worked as a line judge for one of his son's preseason games, between the Cardinals and the San Diego Chargers on August 14, 1999.

On March 27, 2000, David Boston and Na'il Diggs were traveling northbound in a Hummer on I-71 in Columbus, Ohio. A Ford Escort driven by Danielle Carfagna was traveling the wrong way on the interstate and collided with the Hummer. Boston and Diggs were injured, and Carfagna was killed in the accident. Boston suffered lingering nerve damage from the accident. Police were not able to determine why the woman was driving the wrong way.

On October 19, 2004, Boston was accused of punching a male airline ticket agent who wouldn't let him board a plane at an airport in Burlington, Vermont. He pleaded no contest, was fined $500 and paid $211 in restitution.

On August 23, 2007, Boston was arrested in Pinellas Park, Florida and charged with DUI after a failed sobriety test was conducted. Boston was released on his own recognizance. Boston's breath test resulted in a reading of 0.00 BAC. On September 10, 2007, it was released to the media that David Boston tested positive for GHB, a recreational drug that the body produces naturally. After learning of the drug charges the Buccaneers quickly came to an injury settlement with Boston allowing him to be released. On September 12, 2007, Boston was officially released by Tampa Bay when they decided to sign Mark Jones.
