= Andy Katzenmoyer =

American football player (born 1977)

No. 45, 59
- Position: Linebacker

Personal information
- Born: December 2, 1977 (age 48); Kettering, Ohio, U.S.
- Listed height: 6 ft 3 in (1.91 m)
- Listed weight: 260 lb (118 kg)

Career information
- High school: Westerville South (Westerville, Ohio)
- College: Ohio State
- NFL draft: 1999: 1st round, 28th overall pick

Career history
- New England Patriots (1999–2001)

Awards and highlights
- Super Bowl champion (XXXVI); NFL All-Rookie Team (1999); Dick Butkus Award (1997); Jack Lambert Trophy (1997); Consensus All-American (1997); Second-team All-American (1996); 3× First-team All-Big Ten (1996, 1997, 1998); Big Ten Co-Freshman of the Year (1996); Ohio State Varsity Hall of Fame; Ohio State Football All-Century Team

Career NFL statistics
- Games played: 24
- Games started: 14
- Tackles: 101
- Sacks: 3.5
- Interceptions: 1
- Stats at Pro Football Reference

Andrew Warren Katzenmoyer (born December 2, 1977) is an American former professional football player who was a linebacker for the New England Patriots of the National Football League (NFL). He was selected by the Patriots in the first round (28th overall) of the 1999 NFL draft and won Super Bowl XXXVI with the team, though he did not play a game that season. He played college football for the Ohio State Buckeyes, and became the first Buckeye to win the Butkus Award. His playing career was shortened due to a neck injury.

== Early life ==
Katzenmoyer was born in Kettering, Ohio. He and his family moved to Westerville, Ohio when he was 5. He attended Westerville South High School, and played high school football for the Westerville South Wildcats. Katzenmoyer won the 1995 Associated Press Mr. Football Award for the state of Ohio, and was named the 1995 USA Today All-USA Team Defensive Player of the Year.

The Wildcats football team was state of Ohio high school championship runner-ups in his junior year (1994). In his senior year (1995), the Wildcats were ranked nationally at #14 in the USA Today Super 25, and were 11–0 before losing to Youngstown Boardman in the regional finals.

== College career ==
Katzenmoyer attended Ohio State University, where he played for the Ohio State Buckeyes football team from 1996 to 1998. In the first game of his college career, he became the first true freshman to ever start at linebacker for the Buckeyes. As a freshman he recorded 12 sacks including three in the 1997 Rose Bowl. As a sophomore in 1997, he was recognized as a consensus first-team All-American, and won the Dick Butkus Award and Jack Lambert Trophy. Katzenmoyer was a three time first-team all-Big Ten selection. He started 37 consecutive games and finished his college career with 256 tackles, 50 tackles-for-loss, 18 sacks and six Interceptions. In 2009, he was inducted into the Ohio State Athletics Hall Of Fame. Notably, he was the last player at Ohio State to wear number 45.

== Professional career ==
The New England Patriots selected Katzenmoyer in the first round (28th pick overall) of the 1999 NFL draft.

In Week 6 of the 1999 season, Katzenmoyer became the second rookie in NFL history to record 2.0+ sacks and a touchdown in a single game, the first being Todd Shell. He had intercepted a pass from Miami Dolphins quarterback Dan Marino in the first three minutes of the first quarter, and returned it for 57 yards. As of 2023, only 1 other rookie, Devon Witherspoon, had achieved this statistic afterwards.

He suffered a neck injury during his first season with the Patriots. After playing in 24 games with 14 starts throughout his career, he was eventually forced to have surgery and miss half of the 2000 season. During training camp in 2001, Katzenmoyer walked out, citing concern about a feeling in his neck. He was placed on injured reserve for the entire 2001 season.

On June 14, 2002, the Patriots released Katzenmoyer.

== Personal life ==
Katzenmoyer is now a risk management adviser for Hosket Ulen Insurance Solutions along with serving on the board for neighborhood bridges.
