= Charles A. Hickey =

American football player and coach (1874–1929)

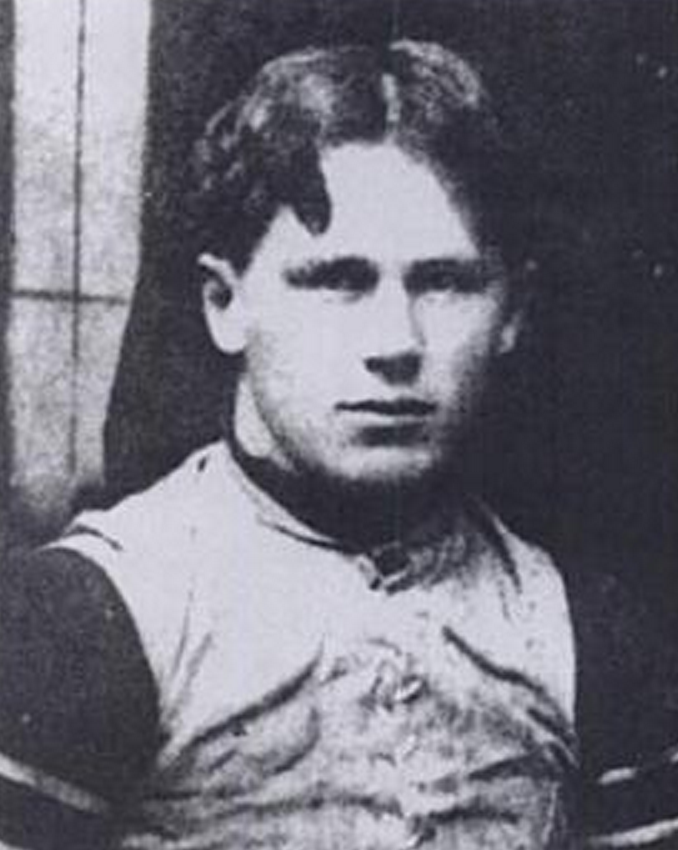
- Hickey pictured probably c. 1890s

Biographical details
- Born: June 29, 1874; Auburn, New York, U.S.
- Died: March 4, 1929 (aged 54); New York, New York, U.S.
- Education: Williams College

Playing career
- 1895: Williams

Coaching career (HC unless noted)
- 1896: Ohio State

Head coaching record
- Overall: 5–5–1

Charles Avery Hickey (June 29, 1874 – March 4, 1929) was an American college football coach. He served as the third head football coach at Ohio State University, serving for one season in 1896 and compiling a record of 5–5–1. Hickey later worked as a lawyer. He died of pneumonia in 1929. He was buried in Auburn, New York.

== Head coaching record ==
Year	Team	Overall	Conference	Standing	Bowl/playoffs
Ohio State Buckeyes (Independent) (1896)
1896	Ohio State	5–5–1			
Ohio State:		5–5–1			
Total:		5–5–1			
