= 1990 Liberty Bowl =

- 32nd Liberty Bowl
Air Force Falcons	Ohio State Buckeyes
(6–5)	(7–3–1)
WAC	Big Ten
23	11
Head coach: Fisher DeBerry	Head coach: John Cooper
	AP / Coaches; 24 / 20
	1	2	3	4	Total
Air Force	0	6	7	10	23
Ohio State	5	0	0	6	11
- Date: December 27, 1990
- Season: 1990
- Stadium: Liberty Bowl Memorial Stadium
- Location: Memphis, Tennessee
- MVP: QB Rob Perez (Air Force)
- Referee: Jim Knight (ACC)
- Attendance: 39,262

United States TV coverage
- Network: ESPN
- Announcers: Wayne Larrivee and Ben Bennett

The 1990 Liberty Bowl was a college football postseason bowl game played on December 27, 1990, at Liberty Bowl Memorial Stadium in Memphis, Tennessee. The 32nd edition of the Liberty Bowl, it matched the Air Force Falcons and the Ohio State Buckeyes. Air Force won the game by a score of 23–11.

== Background ==
The highlight of the Falcons' season was defeating Navy and Army to win the 1990 Commander-in-Chief Trophy while finishing 6th out of 9 teams in the Western Athletic Conference. Ohio State's biggest profile win was against then-#6 Iowa. They had finished 5th in the Big Ten Conference in a year that had four co-champions. This was the second Liberty Bowl for both teams; Air Force having played in the prior edition, and Ohio State having played in 1981.

== Game summary ==
Despite outweighing their defense, Ohio State could not get the run going, as Robert Smith only had 62 rushing yards and one touchdown. Ohio State quarterback Greg Frey went 10 for 27 for 110 yards, but also threw an interception before being replaced by Kent Graham late. Ohio State had a 5-0 lead in the first due to recovering a muffed punt in the end zone for a safety and later converting a field goal. But Perez gave the Falcons the lead with 3:42 in the half on a touchdown sneak, entering halftime with a 6-5 lead. Perez added in another touchdown run to make it 13-5 in the third quarter. Ohio State narrowed the lead to 13-11 as they went for two to tie. But Graham's pass was too high to his receiver, keeping the deficit at 2. The Falcons added a field goal after a bad punt to make it 16-11. While driving to try to take the lead, Frey's pass was intercepted and returned 40 yards by Carlton McDonald (his second of the day), clinching the win for Air Force, their first bowl win since the 1985 Bluebonnet Bowl. Rob Perez only threw 1 for 3 passes (a Liberty Bowl record for fewest pass completions) for 11 yards and an interception, but he also rushed for 93 yards and 2 touchdowns for Air Force.

== Aftermath ==
Ohio State would not win a bowl game until 1993. Air Force would go to two straight Liberty Bowls. As of the beginning of the 2021 college football season, this is the only meeting between Air Force and Ohio State. This is currently Ohio State’s last loss to a non power conference.
