= Reggie Germany =

American football player (born 1978)

No. 84
- Position: Wide receiver

Personal information
- Born: March 19, 1978 (age 48); Hazelwood, Missouri, U.S.
- Listed height: 6 ft 1 in (1.85 m)
- Listed weight: 180 lb (82 kg)

Career information
- High school: Hazelwood East
- College: Ohio State (1997-2000)
- NFL draft: 2001: 7th round, 214th overall pick

Career history
- Buffalo Bills (2001–2002)

Awards and highlights
- 2001 Hula Bowl MVP

Career NFL statistics
- Receptions: 12
- Receiving yards: 203
- Touchdowns: 0
- Stats at Pro Football Reference

Reginald Lee Germany (born March 19, 1978) is an American former professional football player who was a wide receiver in the National Football League (NFL). He was selected by the Buffalo Bills in the seventh round of the 2001 NFL draft. He played college football for the Ohio State Buckeyes.
