= 1992 Hall of Fame Bowl =

- 6th Hall of Fame Bowl
Syracuse Orangemen	Ohio State Buckeyes
(9–2)	(8–3)
Big East	Big Ten
24	17
Head coach: Paul Pasqualoni	Head coach: John Cooper
AP / Coaches; 16 / 16	AP / Coaches; 25 / 22
	1	2	3	4	Total
Syracuse	14	0	7	3	24
Ohio State	0	3	7	7	17
- Date: January 1, 1992
- Season: 1991
- Stadium: Tampa Stadium
- Location: Tampa, Florida
- MVP: Marvin Graves (Syracuse QB)
- Referee: Al Ford (SEC)

United States TV coverage
- Network: NBC
- Announcers: Don Criqui and Bob Trumpy

The 1992 Hall of Fame Bowl featured the 16th-ranked Syracuse Orangemen, and the 25th-ranked Ohio State Buckeyes. It was the sixth edition to the Hall of Fame Bowl.

Syracuse scored first on a 50-yard touchdown pass from Marvin Graves to Shelby Hill for a 7–0 lead. Graves ran three yards for a touchdown as Syracuse led 14–0 after the first quarter. In the second quarter, Ohio State's Williams kicked a 34-yard field goal.

In the third quarter, Biskup kicked a 32-yard field goal to give Syracuse a 17–3 lead. Ohio State's Carlos Snow ran two yards for a touchdown to cut the lead to 17–10. In the fourth quarter, Ohio State recovered a blocked punt in the end zone for a touchdown to tie it at 17. Syracuse scored the gamewinning touchdown on a 60-yard bomb from Marvin Graves to Antonio Johnson. Syracuse won the game by a 24–17 margin.
