= 1993 Holiday Bowl =

1993 Thrifty Car Rental Holiday Bowl
Ohio State Buckeyes	BYU Cougars
(9–1–1)	(6–5)
Big Ten	WAC
28	21
Head coach: John Cooper	Head coach: LaVell Edwards
AP / Coaches / BC; 11 / 10 / 11
	1	2	3	4	Total
Ohio State	14	7	7	0	28
BYU	7	14	0	0	21
- Date: December 30, 1993
- Season: 1993
- Stadium: Jack Murphy Stadium
- Location: San Diego, California
- MVP: Offensive: John Walsh (BYU); Defensive: Lorenzo Styles (Ohio State)
- Referee: Loyd Dale (SWC)
- Halftime show: Marching bands
- Attendance: 52,108
- Payout: US$1,700,000 per team

United States TV coverage
- Network: ESPN
- Announcers: Brad Nessler, Gary Danielson and Sharlene Hawkes

The 1993 Holiday Bowl was a college football bowl game played December 30, 1993, in San Diego, California. It was part of the 1993 NCAA Division I-A football season. It featured the tenth ranked Big Ten co-champion Ohio State Buckeyes, and the unranked BYU Cougars. It was famous for coach John Cooper's famous bowl win guarantee, which he came through on.

== Game summary ==
- Ohio State - Patillo 20 punt return (Williams kick), 11:04
- BYU - Willis 27 pass from Walsh (Herrick kick), 8:49
- Ohio State - Harris 2 run (Williams kick), 5:30
- Ohio State - Harris 2 run (Williams kick), 14:55
- BYU - Lewis 8 pass from Walsh (Herrick kick), 7:29
- BYU - Doman 27 pass from Walsh (Herrick kick), 3:25
- Ohio State - Harris 1 run (Williams kick), 4:11

Ohio State got on the board first after defender Tim Patillo recovered a blocked punt, and ran it in four yards for a touchdown, putting Ohio State up 7–0. BYU quarterback John Walsh threw a 27-yard touchdown pass to running back Jamal Willis tying the game at 7. Ohio State running back senior Raymont Harris scored on a 2-yard touchdown run to cap the first quarter scoring, and give Ohio State a 14–7 lead. He would finish with a Holiday Bowl record 235 yards rushing on 39 carries.

In the second quarter, Raymont Harris scored on another two-yard touchdown run giving Ohio State a 21–7 lead. BYU's John Walsh threw an 8-yard touchdown pass to tight end Chad Lewis pulling BYU to 21–14. John Walsh later threw a 27-yard touchdown pass to Bryce Doman before halftime, tying the game at 21.

In the third quarter, Raymont Harris scored his third rushing touchdown of the game, a 1 yarder, to give Ohio State a 28–21 lead. In the fourth quarter, John Walsh threw a 52-yard pass to Eric Drage, giving BYU the ball at the Ohio State 6-yard line with 32 seconds left. On 1st and 2nd down, Walsh threw two incomplete passes, making it 3rd down. Walsh then found a wide open Tim Nowatzke, but he dropped it. He was wide open again on 4th down, but Walsh underthrew him, giving Ohio State the win.

To date, this is the last Holiday Bowl appearance for BYU, having appeared in 10 out of the 16 games played at the time.
