= Joe Germaine =

American football player (born 1975)

No. 9, 10
- Position: Quarterback

Personal information
- Born: November 16, 1975 (age 50); Denver, Colorado, U.S.
- Listed height: 6 ft 1 in (1.85 m)
- Listed weight: 220 lb (100 kg)

Career information
- High school: Mountain View (Mesa, Arizona)
- College: Ohio State (1996–1998)
- NFL draft: 1999: 4th round, 101st overall pick

Career history
- St. Louis Rams (1999–2000); Kansas City Chiefs (2001); Barcelona Dragons (2002); Cincinnati Bengals (2002); San Diego Chargers (2004)*; Arizona Rattlers (2004–2005); Utah Blaze (2006–2008); Arizona Rattlers (2010)*
- * Offseason or practice squad member only

Awards and highlights
- Super Bowl champion (XXXIV); Second-team All-Arena (2008); Big Ten Most Valuable Player (1998); Big Ten Co-Offensive Player of the Year (1998); First-team All-Big Ten (1998); Ohio State Football All-Century Team

Career NFL statistics
- Passing attempts: 16
- Passing completions: 9
- Completion percentage: 56.3%
- TD–INT: 1–2
- Passing yards: 136
- Passer rating: 65.6
- Stats at Pro Football Reference

Career AFL statistics
- Passing attempts: 1,770
- Passing completions: 1,185
- Completion percentage: 66.9%
- TD–INT: 290–38
- Passing yards: 14,416
- Stats at ArenaFan.com

Joseph Berton Germaine (born November 16, 1975) is an American former professional football player who was a quarterback in the National Football League (NFL) and the Arena Football League (AFL). He played college football for the Ohio State Buckeyes and was selected by the St. Louis Rams in the fourth round of the 1999 NFL draft.

Germaine earned a Super Bowl ring with the Rams in Super Bowl XXXIV. He was also a member of the Kansas City Chiefs, Cincinnati Bengals, San Diego Chargers, Utah Blaze and Arizona Rattlers.

== Early life ==
Germaine attended Mountain View High School in Mesa, Arizona, and was a letterman in football, basketball, and baseball. He became a starter midway through his junior year and set school records with 3,782 passing yards, a 59% completion percentage, and 39 touchdown passes. As a senior, he connected on 123 of 209 passes for 2,081 yards and 23 touchdowns. He was drafted by the Colorado Rockies as a high school baseball prospect.

== College career ==
Germaine was recruited by Northern Arizona University (NAU) out of high school, but NAU was wary of his intention to serve a two-year Mormon mission, and thus did not offer him a scholarship. Germaine played one season (1995) at Scottsdale Community College in Arizona before transferring to Ohio State University. In 1996 and 1997 he was the backup to quarterback Stanley Jackson, but saw significant playing time as the two shared QB duties. Germaine's most memorable moment in his years as a backup came at the 1997 Rose Bowl. He led the Buckeyes on a 65-yard drive in 12 plays in the final 1:40 for the winning touchdown against Arizona State, a five-yard pass to David Boston with 19 seconds left. Germaine passed for 131 yards in the game and was named the game's MVP.

In his senior year (1998) at Ohio State, Germaine was a full-time starter at quarterback, as well as a team co-captain. That year, he set 11 school records, throwing for 3,330 yards and 25 touchdowns. He was the Chicago Tribune Silver Football Award winner as well as the Big Ten Conference Most Valuable Player that year. He threw for 6,370 yards and 56 touchdowns in three seasons.

Germaine was selected to the Ohio State Football All-Century Team in 2000.

=== Statistics ===
Year	Com.	Att.	PCT	Yards	TD	INT
1996	80	147	54.4	1,193	15	4
1997	129	210	61.4	1,847	16	9
1998	230	384	59.9	3,330	25	7
Total	670	1097	59.2	6,370	56	20

== Professional career ==
Pre-draft measurables
Height	Weight	Arm length	Hand span	40-yard dash	10-yard split	20-yard split	20-yard shuttle	Three-cone drill	Vertical jump	Broad jump	Wonderlic
6 ft 1 1/4 in (1.86 m)	211 lb (96 kg)	30 5/8 in (0.78 m)	9 1/4 in (0.23 m)	4.80 s	1.62 s	2.76 s	4.21 s	7.16 s	32 in (0.81 m)	8 ft 9 in (2.67 m)	25
All values from NFL Combine

=== St. Louis Rams ===
Germaine was selected in the fourth round (101st overall) of the 1999 NFL draft by the St. Louis Rams. He won a Super Bowl ring as a backup to Kurt Warner as a rookie. Germaine appeared in only three games, completing nine passes, and was cut at the end of the 2000 season.

=== Kansas City Chiefs ===
Germaine was traded to the Kansas City Chiefs. He appeared in three games with the Kansas City Chiefs in 2001. He was waived on September 1, 2002.

=== Cincinnati Bengals ===
Germaine was signed to the practice squad of the Cincinnati Bengals on October 17, 2002. He was promoted to the active roster on December 12 and served the remainder of the season as the third-string quarterback. He was released on April 23, 2003.

Germaine worked out for the Seattle Seahawks in August 2003, but was not signed and spent the rest of the season out of football. Germaine was signed by the San Diego Chargers on August 6, 2004, but was waived prior to the regular season on August 26.

=== Arizona Rattlers (first stint) ===
In 2004 Germaine became a quarterback for the Arizona Rattlers of the Arena Football League, where he was a back-up to Sherdrick Bonner.

=== Utah Blaze ===
After two seasons and six starts with the Rattlers, Germaine joined the expansion Utah Blaze in 2006. He started the first nine games of Utah's inaugural season, passing for 2,330 yards and 41 touchdowns while completing 67.4 percent of his passes. His season was cut short by an injury, but he returned in 2007 as the full time starter. He became the first player in league history to pass for over 5,000 yards in a season. He finished with 5,005 yards, surpassing the record of 4,841 yards set by San Jose's Mark Grieb in 2006.

=== Arizona Rattlers (second stint) ===
In October 2008 Germaine opted out of his contract with the Blaze in hopes of returning to the Rattlers. Germaine re-joined the Rattlers prior to their first season in the newly founded Arena Football 1. He was, however, quickly placed on "reassignment" on February 5, 2010.

== Coaching career ==
After being placed on reassignment, Germaine accepted the head coaching job at Queen Creek High School in Queen Creek, Arizona. Athletic Director Paul Reynolds was familiar with Germaine, having played for ASU against him in the 1997 Rose Bowl. Prior to coaching at Queen Creek, Germaine was the quarterbacks coach at Chandler's Basha High School from 2004 until 2007.

In 2012, Germaine's Bulldogs appeared in the Arizona Division III state championship, against Desert Edge High School. With twelve seconds left and the game tied at 7, the snap for a Desert Edge punt was high, sailing over the punter, who picked up the ball and was tackled in the back of the end zone for a safety. Queen Creek won its first state championship 9-7 and finished an undefeated season.
