= 1997 Rose Bowl =

American college football game

- 83rd Rose Bowl Game
Ohio State Buckeyes	Arizona State Sun Devils
(10–1)	(11–0)
20	17
Head coach: John Cooper	Head coach: Bruce Snyder
AP / Coaches / BA; 4 / 4 / 4	AP / Coaches / BA; 2 / 2 / 2
	1	2	3	4	Total
Ohio State	7	0	7	6	20
Arizona State	0	7	3	7	17
- Date: January 1, 1997
- Season: 1996
- Stadium: Rose Bowl
- Location: Pasadena, California
- MVP: Joe Germaine, QB, Ohio State
- Favorite: Ohio State by 1½
- Referee: Terry Monk (Big East)
- Attendance: 100,635

United States TV coverage
- Network: ABC
- Announcers: Brent Musburger (play-by-play); Dick Vermeil (analyst); Jack Arute (sideline)

The 1997 Rose Bowl was a postseason college football bowl game between the Arizona State Sun Devils of the Pacific-10 Conference and the Ohio State Buckeyes of the Big Ten Conference. The game was the 83rd edition of the annual Rose Bowl Game, held on New Year's Day in the Rose Bowl in Pasadena, California. The game resulted in a dramatic 20–17 victory for the Buckeyes when Joe Germaine led a last-minute touchdown drive. Joe Germaine was named the Rose Bowl Player Of The Game. The loss remains infamous among Arizona State fans, as the loss cost them a chance at winning their only national championship. Had they won, they would have been the only undefeated team in the nation, and as a result, would have possibly given the Devils at least a share of the national championship.

== Teams ==
=== Ohio State ===
The Buckeyes had rolled through the regular season using a two-quarterback system; Stanley Jackson and Joe Germaine split time in each game at QB. The Buckeye offensive attack was led by Outland Trophy- and Lombardi Award-winning tackle Orlando Pace (who would go on to be the #1 pick in the ensuing NFL draft) and true freshman wide receiver David Boston, a budding star. The Buckeyes’ only loss was in the regular-season finale against archrival Michigan, which spoiled their undefeated season and national title hopes; however, OSU had clinched a berth in the Rose Bowl one week before The Game with a win over Indiana. The defense was led by the Big Ten Defensive Player of the Year, lockdown cornerback Shawn Springs, and true freshman middle linebacker Andy Katzenmoyer.

=== Arizona State ===
The Sun Devils, meanwhile, were undefeated, ranked #2 in the nation, and had hopes of capturing the school's first national championship in football. Leading the way for ASU were senior quarterback Jake Plummer, tailback Terry Battle, and a stingy defense led by end Derrick Rodgers and linebacker Pat Tillman. Perhaps ASU's most impressive regular-season victory came against defending national champion Nebraska, when ASU's defense held the ’Huskers scoreless; Arizona State won by a score of 19–0.

== Game summary ==
=== First quarter ===
The Buckeyes scored first midway through the opening period when quarterback Stanley Jackson threw a nine-yard touchdown pass to true freshman wideout David Boston, capping a drive that saw Jackson scramble for some twenty yards on a third down. Josh Jackson’s PAT was good, making it 7–0 in favor of the Buckeyes. No other scoring ensued in the period, and the Buckeyes led after one, 7–0.

=== Second quarter ===
Shortly before halftime, the Sun Devils finally answered via a 25-yard pass play from Jake Plummer to Ricky Boyer, tying the game after Robert Nycz’s extra point. Replays seemed to show that Boyer had trapped the ball against the end zone turf, but the touchdown stood. Neither team could manage any more points before halftime, and the game went to the break, still tied at 7–7.

=== Third quarter ===
After halftime, the Sun Devils would add a 37-yard field goal by Nycz to take a 10-7 lead on the opening drive of the second half.
The Buckeyes countered only two plays later, when Joe Germaine hit Dimitrious Stanley on a post pattern. ASU corner Jason Simmons slipped and fell on the turf, and Stanley was off to the races. 72 yards and an extra point later, the Buckeyes were back on top with a 14–10 lead.
No more scoring ensued in the third, and the teams went to the fourth quarter with the game very much up for grabs.

=== Fourth quarter ===
Late in the fourth quarter, the Buckeyes looked to put the game away. Pepe Pearson broke a long run, leading the Buckeyes from inside their own five-yard line deep into ASU territory. However, the drive stalled only three plays later, and OSU had to settle for a Josh Jackson field goal attempt.
That was not to be, as ASU's Brent Burnstein blocked the kick. ASU Defensive end Derrick Rodgers took what appeared to be a lateral and ran the ball into the end zone, but the play was called back: Rodgers had taken an illegal forward lateral. The Sun Devils, however, had the ball with less than five minutes to play.
Jake Plummer, who had built a reputation over his college career for leading late comeback drives, did just that. The key play was a fourth down conversion when Plummer hit wideout Lenzie Jackson for a big gain. With just over a minute remaining, Plummer scrambled for eleven yards and a touchdown on third-and-goal, and ASU took the lead, 17–14.
However, Germaine was not done. He led the Buckeyes on a remarkable last-minute drive. Dimitrious Stanley caught two third-down passes from Germaine, and then, with the help of two pass interference penalties against ASU, the Bucks had the ball on the Devils’ five-yard line. Germaine then flipped a pass to the aforementioned Boston, who was left undefended on a zig-out route — ASU redshirt freshman corner Courtney Jackson had blown the coverage. Boston walked into the end zone untouched, and the Buckeyes, with 19 seconds left, retook the lead, 20–17. On the next play, Burnstein blocked Josh Jackson's extra point, leaving the Sun Devils within a field goal.

Ultimately, Lenzie Jackson would be tackled in bounds by OSU's Antoine Winfield after catching a pass from Plummer on the second play of the ensuing drive, and time ran out. The Buckeyes had won the Rose Bowl — their first victory in the Rose Bowl since Archie Griffin’s sophomore season.

== Scoring summary ==
Scoring play	Score
1st Quarter
OSU - David Boston 9-yard pass from Stanley Jackson (Josh Jackson kick) 5:04	OSU 7, ASU 0
2nd Quarter
ASU - Ricky Boyer 25-yard pass from Jake Plummer (Robert Nycz kick) 10:04	ASU 7, OSU 7
3rd Quarter
ASU - Nycz 37-yard field goal 9:12	ASU 10, OSU 7
OSU -Dimitrious Stanley 72-yard pass from Joe Germaine (J. Jackson kick) 8:23	OSU 14, ASU 10
4th Quarter
ASU - Plummer 11-yard run (Nycz kick) 1:40	ASU 17, OSU 14
OSU - Boston 5-yard pass from Germaine (kick blocked) 0:19	OSU 20, ASU 17

== Aftermath ==
The Buckeyes would finish #2 in the nation after winning their first Rose Bowl since January 1, 1974, handing the Sun Devils their only loss of the season. The previously-third-ranked Florida Gators would end up winning the national championship after defeating the then-top-ranked Florida State Seminoles 52–20 in the Sugar Bowl. FSU had defeated the Gators earlier in the season by a score of 24–21. Had the Sun Devils won the game, they would likely had a claim to at least the AP national championship, since they would have been the only undefeated team in the nation. They ultimately finished fourth in both polls, behind Florida, Ohio State and Florida State.

Buckeye quarterback Joe Germaine, who was named the game's Most Valuable Player, would go on to be named the Big Ten's Most Valuable Player during his senior season of 1998. Many of the players on both teams’ rosters would go on to pro careers: notably, Jake Plummer, Pat Tillman, Derek Smith, Jason Simmons, Scott Von Der Ahe, Steve Bush, and Derrick Rodgers of Arizona State, and Mike Vrabel, Shawn Springs, Orlando Pace, Antoine Winfield, Rob Kelly and Damon Moore of Ohio State.

== Game notes ==
- The game was played in the rain
- Ohio State head coach John Cooper became the first coach to lead a Big Ten and a Pac-10 team to Rose Bowl victories. Previously, Cooper had led the Sun Devils to their only Rose Bowl victory, defeating Michigan in the 1987 Rose Bowl by a score of 22–15.
