= 2001 Ohio State Buckeyes football team =

American college football season

2001 Ohio State Buckeyes football

Outback Bowl, L 28–31 vs. South Carolina
- Conference: Big Ten Conference
- Record: 7–5 (5–3 Big Ten)
- Head coach: Jim Tressel (1st season)
- Offensive coordinator: Jim Bollman (1st season)
- Offensive scheme: Multiple
- Defensive coordinator: Mark Dantonio (1st season)
- Base defense: 4–3
- MVP: Jonathon Wells
- Captains: Steve Bellisari; Mike Collins; Joe Cooper; Jamar Martin
- Home stadium: Ohio Stadium (Capacity: 101,568)

2001 Big Ten Conference football standings
	Conf.			Overall
Team	W		L	W		L
No. 12 Illinois $	7	–	1	10	–	2
No. 20 Michigan	6	–	2	8	–	4
Ohio State	5	–	3	7	–	5
Iowa	4	–	4	7	–	5
Purdue	4	–	4	6	–	6
Penn State	4	–	4	5	–	6
Indiana	4	–	4	5	–	6
Michigan State	3	–	5	7	–	5
Wisconsin	3	–	5	5	–	7
Minnesota	2	–	6	4	–	7
Northwestern	2	–	6	4	–	7
$ – BCS representative as conference champion; Rankings from AP Poll

The 2001 Ohio State Buckeyes football team was an American football team that represented the Ohio State University as a member of the Big Ten Conference during the 2001 NCAA Division I-A football season. In their first year under head coach Jim Tressel, the Buckeyes compiled a 7–5 record (5–3 in conference games), finished in third place in the Big Ten, and outscored opponents by a total of 284 to 213. Against ranked opponents, the Buckeyes lost to No. 14 UCLA and No. 12 Illinois and defeated No. 14 Northwestern and No. 11 Michigan. They concluded the season with a 31–28 loss to No. 14 South Carolina in the 2002 Outback Bowl. For the second consecutive season, the Buckeyes were unranked in the final AP and Coaches polls.

The Buckeyes gained an average of 190.3 rushing yards and 178.7 passing yards per game. On defense, they gave up 140.5 rushing yards and 194.3 passing yards per game. The team's statistical leaders included quarterback Steve Bellisari (1,599 passing yards, 53.0% completion percentage), running back Jonathan Wells (1,257 rushing yards, 5.4 yards per carry, 90 points scored), and wide receiver Michael Jenkins (41 receptions for 836 yards). Center LeCharles Bentley was selected as a consensus first-team All-American. Three Ohio State players received first-team honors on the 2001 All-Big Ten Conference football team: Bentley; offensive tackle Tyson Walter; and defensive back Mike Doss.

The team played its home games at Ohio Stadium in Columbus, Ohio.

== Schedule ==
Date	Time	Opponent	Rank	Site	TV	Result	Attendance	Source
September 8	12:00 p.m.	Akron*	No. 24	Ohio Stadium; Columbus, OH		W 28–14	102,602	
September 22	3:30 p.m.	at No. 14 UCLA*	No. 21	Rose Bowl; Pasadena, CA	ABC	L 6–13	73,723	
September 29	12:00 p.m.	at Indiana		Memorial Stadium; Bloomington, IN	ESPN Plus	W 27–14	48,577	
October 6	7:45 p.m.	No. 14 Northwestern		Ohio Stadium; Columbus, OH	ESPN	W 38–20	104,042	
October 13	3:30 p.m.	Wisconsin	No. 21	Ohio Stadium; Columbus, OH	ABC	L 17–20	103,520	
October 20	12:00 p.m.	San Diego State*		Ohio Stadium; Columbus, OH	ESPN Plus	W 27–12	102,432	
October 27	12:00 p.m.	at Penn State		Beaver Stadium; University Park, PA (rivalry)	ESPN	L 27–29	108,327	
November 3	7:45 p.m.	at Minnesota		Hubert H. Humphrey Metrodome; Minneapolis, MN	ESPN	W 31–28	45,407	
November 10	12:00 p.m.	Purdue		Ohio Stadium; Columbus, OH	ESPN2	W 35–9	104,189	
November 17	12:00 p.m.	No. 12 Illinois	No. 25	Ohio Stadium; Columbus, OH (Illibuck)	ESPN	L 22–34	104,407	
November 24	1:00 p.m.	at No. 11 Michigan		Michigan Stadium; Ann Arbor, MI (rivalry)	ABC	W 26–20	111,571	
January 1, 2002	11:00 a.m.	vs. No. 14 South Carolina*	No. 22	Raymond James Stadium; Tampa, FL (Outback Bowl)	ESPN	L 28–31	66,249	
*Non-conference game; Rankings from AP Poll released prior to the game; All times are in Eastern time

== Rankings ==
Ranking movements Legend: ██ Increase in ranking ██ Decrease in ranking — = Not ranked
	Week																
Poll	Pre	1	2	3	4	5	6	7	8	9	10	11	12	13	14	15	Final
AP	23	23	24	21	—	—	21	—	—	—	—	25	—	23	22	22	—
Coaches	21	21	22	21	—	—	25	—	—	—	—	—	—	25	23	23	—
BCS	Not released								—	—	—	—	—	—	—	—	Not released

== Preseason ==
The 2001 Ohio State Buckeyes football season marked a transition from former head coach John Cooper to new head coach Jim Tressel. Tressel was beginning his first season as head coach at the Division I-A level as the 22nd head coach of the Buckeyes. He came from Youngstown State University where he led the Penguins to four national championships at the Division I-AA level. The Buckeyes finished the 2000 season with an 8–4 record and Coach Cooper was later fired on January 2, 2001.

Prior to Cooper's firing, the Buckeyes were ranked 23rd in the AP Poll, losing in the 2001 Outback Bowl to the South Carolina Gamecocks by a score of 24–7.

== Game summaries ==
=== Akron ===
Team	1	2	3	4	Total
Akron	0	7	0	7	14
• Ohio St	14	7	7	0	28

- Date: September 8
- Location: Ohio Stadium, Columbus, Ohio
- Game attendance: 102,602

Scoring summary
1	7:36	OHST	Jonathan Wells 14 yard run (Josh Huston kick)	Ohio St 7–0
1	3:30	OHST	Jamar Martin 10 yard pass from Steve Bellisari (Josh Huston kick)	Ohio St 14–0
2	9:14	OHST	Jonathan Wells 1 yard run (Josh Huston kick)	Ohio St 21–0
2	2:09	AKRN	Jake Schifino 15 yard pass from Charlie Frye (Zac Derr kick)	Ohio St 21–7
3	3:37	OHST	Chris Vance 61 yard pass from Steve Bellisari (Josh Huston kick)	Ohio St 28–7
4	7:48	AKRN	Rickie Coble 87 yard interception return (Zac Derr kick)	Ohio St 28–14

=== Michigan ===
Ohio State Buckeyes at #11 Michigan Wolverines

Quarter	1	2	3	4	Total
Ohio State	7	16	0	3	26
Michigan	0	0	7	13	20

at Michigan Stadium, Ann Arbor, Michigan

- Date: November 24, 2001
- Game time: 12:00 p.m. EST
- Game weather: High 50s, Cloudy, wind 15 mph ESE
- Game attendance: 111,571
- Referee: S. Newman

Game information

First quarter

- OSU - Jonathan Wells 1-yd run (Mike Nugent kick)

Second quarter

- OSU - Jonathan Wells 46-yd run (Mike Nugent kick)
- OSU - Jonathan Wells 11-yd run (Mike Nugent kick)
- OSU - Team safety

Third quarter

- MICH - M. Walker 21-yd pass from John Navarre (Hayden Epstein kick)

Fourth quarter

- MICH - B.J. Askew 2-yd run (pass failed)
- OSU - Mike Nugent 33-yd field goal
- MICH - M. Walker 11-yd pass from John Navarre (Hayden Epstein kick)

Top Passers

- OSU - Craig Krenzel - 11/18, 118 yards, 1 INT
- MICH - John Navarre - 21/47, 206 yards, 2 TDs, 4 INTs

Top Rushers

- OSU - Jonathan Wells - 25 rushes, 129 yards, 3 TDs
- MICH - Chris Perry - 6 rushes, 53 yards

Top Receivers

- MICH - M. Walker - 5 receptions, 160 yards, 2 TDs
- OSU - Darnell Sanders - 3 receptions, 38 yards

Top Tacklers

- MICH - Victor Hobson - 10 (9 solo, 1 assisted)
- MICH - Eric Brackens - 10 (6 solo, 4 assisted)
- OSU - Joe Cooper - 8 (all solo)
- OSU - Tim Anderson - 8 (7 solo, 1 assisted)

Interceptions

- OSU - 4 - Mike Doss (2), Dustin Fox (1), Tim Anderson (1)
- MICH - 1 - Todd Howard

== Personnel ==
=== Coaching staff ===
- Jim Tressel - Head Coach (1st year)
- Jim Bollman - Offensive Line/OC (1st year)
- Ken Conaster - Special Teams (1st year)
- Bill Conley - Tight Ends / Recruiting Coordinator (15th year)
- Joe Daniels - Quarterbacks (1st year)
- Mark Dantonio - Defensive Coordinator (1st year)
- Jim Heacock - Defensive Line (6th year)
- Mark Snyder - Defensive Linebackers (1st year)
- Tim Spencer - Running Backs (8th year)
- Mel Tucker - Defensive Backs (1st year)
- Bob Tucker - Director of Football Operations (7th year)
- Dick Tressel - Associate Director of Football Operations (1st year)

=== Roster ===
2001 Ohio State Buckeyes football team roster
Players
Coaches
Offense

Pos.	#	Name	Class
FL	3	Bam Childress	Fr
QB	8	Steve Bellisari	Sr
WR	9	Ricky Bryant	So
SE	12	Michael Jenkins	So
QB	15	Scott McMullen	So
QB	16	Craig Krenzel	So
QB	17	Rick McFadden	So
RB	28	Jonathan Wells	Sr
C	68	LeCharles Bentley	Sr
G	76	Alex Stepanovich	So
OT	77	Tyson Walter	Sr
TE	88	Ben Hartsock	So
TE	89	Darnell Sanders	Jr

Defense

Pos.	#	Name	Class
S	2	Mike Doss	Jr
DB	4	Rob Harley	Fr
LB	6	Cie Grant	Jr
DB	7	Derek Ross	Jr
S	25	Donnie Nickey	Jr
LB	35	Matt Wilhelm	Jr
LB	36	Pat O'Neill	So
LB	46	Fred Pagac Jr.	So
LB	58	Courtland Bullard	Sr
DE	93	Will Smith	So
DE	97	Kenny Peterson	Sr

Special teams

Pos.	#	Name	Class
PK	23	Josh Huston	Fr
PK	85	Mike Nugent	Fr

Head coach

- Jim Tressel

Coordinators/assistant coaches

Legend

- (C) Team captain
- (S) Suspended
- (I) Ineligible
- Injured
- Redshirt

Roster
Last update: 2001-12-16

=== Depth chart ===
Defense

FS
25 Donnie Nickey
26 Will Allen

WLB	Middle LB	SLB
58 Courtland Bullard	35 Matt Wilhelm	10 Joe Cooper
6 Cie Grant	46 Fred Pagac Jr	44 Robert Reynolds

SS
2 Mike Doss
41 Thomas Matthews

CB
24 Maurice Lee
11 Richard McNutt

DE	DT	DT	DE
56 Darrion Scott	54 Tim Anderson	98 Mike Collins	93 Will Smith
49 Tim Cheatwood	95 David Thompson	97 Kenny Peterson	75 Simon Fraser

CB
7 Derek Ross
37 Dustin Fox

Offense

WR
12 Michael Jenkins
83 Chris Gamble

LT	LG	C	RG	RT
77 Tyson Walter	63 Adrien Clarke	68 LeCharles Bentley	78 Bryce Bishop	71 Shane Olivea
53 Ivan Douglas	70 Scott Kuhnhein	66 Mike Jacobs	76 Alex Stepanovic	50 Michael Stafford

TE
89 Darnell Sanders
88 Ben Hartsock

WR
4 Chris Vance
9 Ricky Bryant

QB
8 Steve Bellisari
16 Craig Krenzel

Key reserves

FB
39 Jamar Martin
5 Sam Maldonado

Special teams
PK 85 Mike Nugent
PK 23 Josh Huston
P 18 Andy Groom
P 21 B. J. Sander
KR 20 Maurice Hall
PR 4 Chris Vance

RB
28 Jonathan Wells
30 Lydell Ross

Source: Athletic Department official site, 2001 football archive 12-01 depth chart

== 2002 NFL draftees ==
Player	Round	Pick	Position	NFL club
LeCharles Bentley	2	44	Guard	New Orleans Saints
Derek Ross	3	75	Defensive back	Dallas Cowboys
Jonathan Wells	4	99	Running back	Houston Texans
Darnell Sanders	4	122	Tight End	Cleveland Browns
Jamar Martin	4	129	Fullback	Dallas Cowboys
Courtland Bullard	5	167	Linebacker	St. Louis Rams
Tyson Walter	6	179	Center	Dallas Cowboys
Steve Bellisari	6	205	Quarterback	St. Louis Rams
