= 2000 Ohio State Buckeyes football team =

American college football season

2000 Ohio State Buckeyes football

Outback Bowl, L 7–24 vs. South Carolina
- Conference: Big Ten Conference
- Record: 8–4 (5–3 Big Ten)
- Head coach: John Cooper (13th season)
- Offensive coordinator: Chuck Stobart (1st season)
- Offensive scheme: Singleback
- Defensive coordinator: Jon Tenuta (1st season)
- Base defense: 4–3
- MVP: Derek Combs
- Captains: Rodney Bailey; Steve Bellisari; Joe Cooper; Ken-Yon Rambo
- Home stadium: Ohio Stadium

2000 Big Ten Conference football standings
	Conf.			Overall
Team	W		L	W		L
No. 11 Michigan +	6	–	2	9	–	3
Northwestern +	6	–	2	8	–	4
No. 13 Purdue $+	6	–	2	8	–	4
Ohio State	5	–	3	8	–	4
No. 23 Wisconsin	4	–	4	9	–	4
Minnesota	4	–	4	6	–	6
Penn State	4	–	4	5	–	7
Iowa	3	–	5	3	–	9
Illinois	2	–	6	5	–	6
Michigan State	2	–	6	5	–	6
Indiana	2	–	6	3	–	8
$ – BCS representative as conference champion; + – Conference co-champions; Rankings from AP Poll

The 2000 Ohio State Buckeyes football team was an American football team that represented the Ohio State University as a member of the Big Ten Conference during the 2000 NCAA Division I-A football season. In their 13th and final year under head coach John Cooper, the Buckeyes compiled an 8–4 record (5–3 in conference games), finished in fourth place in the Big Ten, and outscored opponents by a total of 324 to 198. Against ranked opponents, the Buckeyes defeated No. 24 Wisconsin and lost to No. 16 Purdue and No. 19 Michigan. They concluded the season with a 24–7 loss to unranked South Carolina in the 2001 Outback Bowl. Cooper was fired two days after the Buckeyes' loss in the Outback Bowl; he had compiled a 2-10-1 record against rival Michigan and a 3–8 record in bowl games.

The Buckeyes gained an average of 161.9 rushing yards and 208.4 passing yards per game. On defense, they gave up 91.6 rushing yards and 227.7 passing yards per game. The team's statistical leaders included quarterback Steve Bellisari (2,162 passing yards, 52.3% completion percentage), running back Derek Combs (863 rushing yards, 5.2 yards per carry), wide receiver Ken-Yon Rambo (51 receptions for 729 yards), and kicker Dan Stultz (91 points scored, 33 of 36 extra points, 19 of 23 field goals). Four Ohio State players received first-team honors on the 2000 All-Big Ten Conference football team: Stultz; linebacker Joe Cooper; and defensive backs Nate Clements and Mike Doss.

The team played its home games at Ohio Stadium in Columbus, Ohio.

== Schedule ==
Date	Time	Opponent	Rank	Site	TV	Result	Attendance	Source
September 2	12:00 p.m.	Fresno State*	No. 16	Ohio Stadium; Columbus, OH	ESPN Plus	W 43–10	96,583	
September 9	10:10 p.m.	at Arizona*	No. 18	Arizona Stadium; Tucson, AZ	FSN	W 27–17	57,367	
September 16	12:00 p.m.	Miami (OH)*	No. 17	Ohio Stadium; Columbus, OH	ESPN Plus	W 27–16	96,721	
September 23	12:00 p.m.	Penn State	No. 14	Ohio Stadium; Columbus, OH	ABC	W 45–6	98,144	
October 7	3:30 p.m.	at No. 24 Wisconsin	No. 8	Camp Randall Stadium; Madison, WI	ABC	W 23–7	79,045	
October 14	12:00 p.m.	Minnesota	No. 6	Ohio Stadium; Columbus, OH	ESPN2	L 17–29	98,120	
October 21	12:00 p.m.	at Iowa	No. 14	Kinnick Stadium; Iowa City, IA	ESPN Plus	W 38–10	60,495	
October 28	3:30 p.m.	at No. 16 Purdue	No. 12	Ross–Ade Stadium; West Lafayette, IN	ABC	L 27–31	68,666	
November 4	12:00 p.m.	Michigan State	No. 16	Ohio Stadium; Columbus, OH	ESPN	W 27–13	98,406	
November 11	4:00 p.m.	at Illinois	No. 13	Memorial Stadium; Champaign, IL (Illibuck)	ESPN	W 24–21	61,207	
November 18	12:00 p.m.	No. 19 Michigan	No. 12	Ohio Stadium; Columbus, OH (rivalry)	ABC	L 26–38	98,681	
January 1, 2001	11:00 a.m.	vs. South Carolina*	No. 22	Raymond James Stadium; Tampa, FL (Outback Bowl)	ESPN	L 7–24	65,229	
*Non-conference game; Rankings from AP Poll released prior to the game; All times are in Eastern time

== Rankings ==
Ranking movements Legend: ██ Increase in ranking ██ Decrease in ranking — = Not ranked
	Week																
Poll	Pre	1	2	3	4	5	6	7	8	9	10	11	12	13	14	15	Final
AP	16	16	18	17	14	12	8	6	14	12	16	11	12	21	20	19	—
Coaches Poll	15	16	16	15	12	10	7	5	13	13	19	14	12	20	19	18	—
BCS	Not released									11	—	13	13	—	—	—	Not released

== Game summaries ==
=== Fresno State ===
Team	1	2	3	4	Total
Fresno State	0	0	3	7	10
• No. 16 Ohio State	13	7	7	16	43

- Date: September 2
- Location: Ohio Stadium, Columbus, OH
- Game attendance: 96,583
- TV announcers (ESPN+): Jim Barbar (Play-by-play), Al Harris (Color) & Jim Lachey (Sideline)

Scoring summary
Q1	1:52	OHST	Doss 1 yard fumble return (kick failed)	OHST 6–0
Q1	1:37	OHST	Mitchell 34 yard fumble return (Stultz kick)	OHST 13–0
Q2	8:59	OHST	Cacchio 23 yard pass from Bellisari (Stultz kick)	OHST 20–0
Q3	10:54	OHST	Mitchell 51 yard interception return (Stultz kick)	OHST 27–0
Q3	9:41	FRES	Asparuhov 25 yard field goal	OHST 27–3
Q4	11:20	OHST	Stultz 34 yard field goal	OHST 30–3
Q4	4:56	OHST	Wilhelm 25 yard interception return (Stultz kick)	OHST 37–3
Q4	:05	FRES	Davis 9 yard pass from Grady (Asparuhov kick)	OHST 37–10
Q4	:00	OHST	Bryant 44 yard pass from McMullen	OHST 43–10

=== Arizona ===
Team	1	2	3	4	Total
• No. 18 Ohio State	3	7	14	3	27
Arizona	7	10	0	0	17

- Date: September 9
- Location: Arizona Stadium, Tucson, AZ
- Game attendance: 57,367
- TV announcers (FSN): Steve Physioc (Play-by-play) & Tom Ramsey (Color)

Scoring summary
Q1	6:41	ARIZ	Jenkins 10 yard run (Keel kick)	ARIZ 7–0
Q1	3:09	OHST	Stultz 26 yard field goal	ARIZ 7–3
Q2	14:11	OHST	Cheatwood 1 yard pass from Bellisari (Stultz kick)	OHST 10–7
Q2	7:29	ARIZ	Safety	OHST 10–9
Q2	6:11	ARIZ	Wade 60 yard pass from Jenkins (Jenkins run)	ARIZ 17–10
Q3	7:53	OHST	Cacchio 60 yard pass from Bellisari (Stultz kick)	Tie 17–17
Q3	2:44	OHST	Wells 1 yard run (Stultz kick)	OHST 24–17
Q4	12:52	OHST	Stultz 20 yard field goal	OHST 27–17

=== Penn State ===
Team	1	2	3	4	Total
Penn State	0	0	6	0	6
• No. 14 Ohio State	14	3	21	7	45

- Date: September 23
- Location: Ohio Stadium, Columbus, OH
- Game attendance: 98,144
- TV announcers (ABC): Brent Musburger (Play-by-play), Gary Danielson (Color) & Jack Arute (Sideline)

Scoring summary
Q1	OHST	Martin 1 yard run (Stultz kick)	OHST 7–0
Q1	OHST	Sanders 18 yard pass from Bellisari (Stultz kick)	OHST 14–0
Q2	OHST	Stultz 31 yard field goal	OHST 17–0
Q3	PSU	McCoo 2 yard run (kick failed)	OHST 17–6
Q3	OHST	Combs 1 yard run (Stultz kick)	OHST 24–6
Q3	OHST	Westbrooks 3 yard run (Stultz kick)	OHST 31–6
Q3	OHST	Collins 11 yard fumble return (Stultz kick)	OHST 38–6
Q4	OHST	Maldonado 7 yard run (Stultz kick)	OHST 45–6

=== Wisconsin ===
Team	1	2	3	4	Total
• No. 8 Ohio State	13	7	3	0	23
No. 24 Wisconsin	0	0	7	0	7

- Date: October 7
- Location: Camp Randall Stadium, Madison, WI
- Game attendance: 79,045
- TV announcers (ABC): Brad Nessler (Play-by-play), Bob Griese (Color) & Lynn Swann (Sideline)

Scoring summary
1	11:51	OHST	Derek Combs 80 yard run (Dan Stultz kick)	Ohio St 7–0
1	6:08	OHST	Derek Combs 21 yard run (kick failed)	Ohio St 13–0
2	1:12	OHST	Darnell Sanders 20 yard pass from Steve Bellisari (Dan Stultz kick)	Ohio St 20–0
3	5:25	WIS	Michael Bennett 35 yard run (Vitaly Pisetsky kick)	Ohio St 20–7
3	2:32	OHST	Dan Stultz 24 yard field goal	Ohio St 23–7

=== Purdue ===
Team	1	2	3	4	Total
No. 12 Ohio State	0	3	17	7	27
• No. 16 Purdue	0	7	3	21	31

- Date: October 28
- Location: Ross–Ade Stadium, West Lafayette, IN
- Game start: 2:34 p.m. EST
- Elapsed time: 3:34
- Game attendance: 68,666
- Game weather: Fair / Mostly sunny, 57 F, wind 15 E
- Referee: Steve Newman
- TV announcers (ABC): Brent Musburger (Play-by-play), Gary Danielson (Color) & Jack Arute (Sideline)

Scoring summary
2	9:02	OSU	Dan Stultz 35-yard field goal	OSU 3–0
2	3:41	PUR	Steve Ennis 2-yard run (Travis Dorsch kick)	PUR 7–3
3	12:40	PUR	Travis Dorsch 34-yard field goal	PUR 10–3
3	8:52	OSU	Dan Stultz 45-yard field goal	PUR 10–6
3	3:41	OSU	Jamar Martin 1-yard run (Stultz kick)	OSU 13–10
3	1:53	OSU	Nate Clements 83-yard punt return (Stultz kick)	OSU 20–10
4	12:46	PUR	John Standeford 5-yard pass from Drew Brees (Dorsch kick)	OSU 20–17
4	5:59	PUR	Vinny Sutherland 19-yard pass from Brees (Dorsch kick)	PUR 24–20
4	2:16	OSU	Westbrooks 2-yard run (Stultz kick)	OSU 27–24
4	1:55	PUR	Seth Morales 64-yard pass from Brees (Dorsch kick)	PUR 31–27

=== Illinois ===
Team	1	2	3	4	Total
• No. 13 Ohio State	3	9	6	6	24
Illinois	7	7	0	7	21

- Date: November 11
- Location: Memorial Stadium, Champaign, IL
- Game attendance: 61,207
- Television network: ESPN
- Source: USA Today

Scoring summary
1	13:25	Illinois	Rocky Harvey 29-yard run (JJ Tubbs kick)	Illinois 7-0
1	8:33	Ohio St	Dan Stultz 19-yard field goal	Illinois 7-3
2	14:42	Ohio St	Dan Stultz 41-yard field goal	Illinois 7-6
2	12:44	Illinois	Antoineo Harris 25-yard run (JJ Tubbs kick)	Illinois 14-6
2	:23	Ohio St	Darnell Sanders 1-yard pass from Steve Bellisari (kick failed)	Illinois 14-12
3	8:21	Ohio St	Darnell Sanders 7-yard pass from Steve Bellisari (two-point conversion failed)	Ohio St 18-14
4	14:17	Illinois	Jameel Cook 1-yard pass from Dustin Ward (JJ Tubbs kick)	Illinois 21-18
4	6:05	Ohio St	Dan Stultz 17-yard field goal	Tie 21-21
4	:00	Ohio St	Dan Stultz 34-yard field goal	Ohio St 24-21

== Personnel ==
=== Coaching staff ===
- John Cooper - Head Coach - 13th year
- George Belu – Offensive line (1st year)
- Bill Conley - Tight ends / recruiting Coordinator (14th year)
- Jim Heacock – Defensive line (5th year)
- Fred Pagac – Assistant head coach (19th year)
- Tim Salem – Quarterbacks / wide receivers (4th year)
- Shawn Simms – Defensive ends (4th year)
- Tim Spencer – Running backs (7th year)
- Chuck Strobart – Offensive coordinator (6th year)
- Jon Tenuta – Defensive coordinator / Defensive Backs (5th year)
- Bob Tucker - Director of football operations (6th year)
- Brian Williams - Defense / Special Teams (1st year)

=== Roster ===
2000 Ohio State Buckeyes football team roster
Players
Coaches
Offense

Pos.	#	Name	Class
WR	4	Ken-Yon Rambo	Sr
QB	8	Steve Bellisari	Jr
WR	9	Ricky Bryant	Fr
WR	14	Mike DeMaria	Fr
QB	15	Scott McMullen	Fr
QB	16	Craig Krenzel	Fr
QB	17	Rick McFadden	Fr
RB	28	Jonathan Wells	Jr
FB	39	Jamar Martin	Jr
C	68	LeCharles Bentley	Jr
C	77	Tyson Walter	Jr
WR	80	Reggie Germany	Sr

Defense

Pos.	#	Name	Class
S	2	Mike Doss	So
LB	6	Cie Grant	So
DB	7	Derek Ross	So
CB	20	Nate Clements	Jr
LB	58	Courtland Bullard	Jr
DT	73	Joe Brown	Sr
DT	79	Ryan Pickett	Jr

Special teams

Pos.	#	Name	Class

Head coach

- John Cooper

Coordinators/assistant coaches

Legend

- (C) Team captain
- (S) Suspended
- (I) Ineligible
- Injured
- Redshirt

Roster
Last update: 2001-02-14

== 2001 NFL draftees ==
Player	Round	Pick	Position	NFL club
Nate Clements	1	21	Defensive back	Buffalo Bills
Ryan Pickett	1	29	Defensive tackle	St. Louis Rams
Rodney Bailey	6	181	Defensive end	Pittsburgh Steelers
Reggie Germany	7	214	Wide receiver	Buffalo Bills
Derek Combs	7	228	Defensive back	Oakland Raiders
Ken-Yon Rambo	7	229	Wide receiver	Oakland Raiders
