= 1999 Ohio State Buckeyes football team =

American college football season

1999 Ohio State Buckeyes football
- Conference: Big Ten Conference
- Record: 6–6 (3–5 Big Ten)
- Head coach: John Cooper (12th season)
- Offensive coordinator: Mike Jacobs (3rd season)
- Offensive scheme: Singleback
- Defensive coordinator: Fred Pagac (4th season)
- Base defense: 4–3
- MVP: Ahmed Plummer
- Captains: Matt Keller; Ahmed Plummer
- Home stadium: Ohio Stadium

1999 Big Ten Conference football standings
	Conf.			Overall
Team	W		L	W		L
No. 4 Wisconsin $	7	–	1	10	–	2
No. 7 Michigan State	6	–	2	10	–	2
No. 5 Michigan %	6	–	2	10	–	2
No. 11 Penn State	5	–	3	10	–	3
No. 18 Minnesota	5	–	3	8	–	4
No. 24 Illinois	4	–	4	8	–	4
No. 25 Purdue	4	–	4	7	–	5
Ohio State	3	–	5	6	–	6
Indiana	3	–	5	4	–	7
Northwestern	1	–	7	3	–	8
Iowa	0	–	8	1	–	10
$ – BCS representative as conference champion; % – BCS at-large representative; Rankings from AP Poll

The 1999 Ohio State Buckeyes football team was an American football team that represented the Ohio State University as a member of the Big Ten Conference during the 1999 NCAA Division I-A football season. In their twelfth year under head coach John Cooper, the Buckeyes compiled a 6–6 record (3–5 in conference games), tied for eighth place in the Big Ten, and were outscored by a total of 287 to 284. Against ranked opponents, the Buckeyes lost to No. 12 Miami, No. 2 Penn State, and No. 10 Michigan, and defeated No. 14 UCLA, No. 17 Purdue, and No. 24 Minnesota. The Buckeyes did not play in a bowl game (for the first time since 1988) and were unranked in the final AP and Coaches polls (for the first time since 1990).

The Buckeyes gained an average of 166.5 rushing yards and 181.2 passing yards per game. On defense, they gave up 159.7 rushing yards and 202.7 passing yards per game. The team's statistical leaders included quarterback Steve Bellisari (1,616 passing yards, 45.1% completion percentage), running back Michael Wiley (952 rushing yards, 5.2 yards per carry), wide receivers Ken-Yon Rambo (41 receptions for 833 yards) and Reggie Germany (43 receptions for 656 yards), and kicker Dan Stultz (67 points scored on 31 of 34 extra points, 12 of 16 field goals). Defensive back Ahmed Plummer was the only Ohio State player to receive first-team honors on the 1999 All-Big Ten Conference football team.

The team played its home games at Ohio Stadium in Columbus, Ohio.

== Schedule ==
Date	Time	Opponent	Rank	Site	TV	Result	Attendance	Source
August 29	2:30 p.m.	vs. No. 12 Miami (FL)*	No. 9	Giants Stadium; East Rutherford, NJ (Kickoff Classic)	ABC	L 12–23	73,037	
September 11	8:00 p.m.	No. 14 UCLA*	No. 13	Ohio Stadium; Columbus, OH	ABC	W 42–20	93,283	
September 18	3:30 p.m.	Ohio*	No. 12	Ohio Stadium; Columbus, OH	ABC	W 40–16	93,222	
September 25	12:00 p.m.	Cincinnati*	No. 12	Ohio Stadium; Columbus, OH	ESPN Plus	W 34–20	93,407	
October 2	3:30 p.m.	Wisconsin	No. 12	Ohio Stadium; Columbus, OH	ABC	L 17–42	93,524	
October 9	3:30 p.m.	No. 18 Purdue	No. 20	Ohio Stadium; Columbus, OH	ABC	W 25–22	93,766	
October 16	12:00 p.m.	at No. 2 Penn State	No. 17	Beaver Stadium; University Park, PA (rivalry)	ABC	L 10–23	97,007	
October 23	12:00 p.m.	at No. 24 Minnesota	No. 22	Hubert H. Humphrey Metrodome; Minneapolis, MN	ESPN	W 20–17	50,842	
October 30	12:00 p.m.	Iowa	No. 21	Ohio Stadium; Columbus, OH	ESPN Plus	W 41–11	93,561	
November 6	12:00 p.m.	at No. 19 Michigan State	No. 20	Spartan Stadium; East Lansing, MI	ESPN	L 7–23	74,639	
November 13	12:00 p.m.	Illinois	No. 25	Ohio Stadium; Columbus, OH (Illibuck)	ESPN2	L 20–46	93,429	
November 20	12:00 p.m.	at No. 10 Michigan		Michigan Stadium; Ann Arbor, MI (rivalry)	ABC	L 17–24	111,575	
*Non-conference game; Rankings from AP Poll released prior to the game; All times are in Eastern time

== Rankings ==
Ranking movements Legend: ██ Increase in ranking ██ Decrease in ranking — = Not ranked
	Week																
Poll	Pre	1	2	3	4	5	6	7	8	9	10	11	12	13	14	15	Final
AP	9	13	13	13	12	12	21	18	22	21	20	25	—	—	—	—	—
Coaches	9	9*	14	12	10	9	19	17	22	21	20	—	—	—	—	—	—
BCS	Not released									—	—	—	—	—	—	—	Not released

== Game summaries ==
=== Miami (FL) ===
Kickoff Classic: Miami (FL) Hurricanes vs. Ohio State Buckeyes

Quarter	1	2	3	4	Total
Miami (FL)	7	16	0	0	23
Ohio St	9	0	3	0	12

at Giants Stadium • East Rutherford, New Jersey

- Date: August 29
- Game time: 2:30 p.m. EDT
- Game weather: Clear • 85 °F (29 °C) • Wind 10–20 N
- Game attendance: 73,037
- Referee: J. Childress
- TV announcers (ABC): Brent Musburger, Dan Fouts, and Dean Blevins
- Box Score

Game information

Miami (FL)

- Kenny Kelly
  17/25, 245 Yds, TD, 2 INT
- James Jackson
  24 Rush, 89 Yds, TD
- Santana Moss
  3 Rec, 115 Yds, TD

Ohio St

- Austin Moherman
  10/22, 107 Yds, TD, 2 INT
- Michael Wiley
  9 Rush, 72 Yds
- Reggie Germany
  4 Rec, 56 Yds

Scoring summary

Quarter	Time	Drive			Team	Scoring information	Score	
Quarter	Time	Plays	Yards	TOP	Team	Scoring information	MIA	OSU
1	11:44	2	42	0:49	Miami (FL)	Jackson 44-yard touchdown run, Crosland kick good	7	0
1	9:30	5	74	2:14	Ohio St	23-yard field goal by Stultz	7	3
1	7:08	2	7	0:40	Ohio St	Wisniewski 6-yard touchdown reception from Moherman, Stultz kick no good	7	9
2	3:14	4	59	1:09	Miami (FL)	Kelly 7-yard touchdown run, 2-point pass good	15	9
2	0:08	4	78	1:48	Miami (FL)	Moss 67-yard touchdown reception from Kelly, 2-point run good	23	9
3	3:40	9	41	4:48	Ohio St	24-yard field goal by Stultz	23	12
"TOP" = time of possession. For other American football terms, see Glossary of American football.							23	12

=== UCLA ===
Team	1	2	3	4	Total
UCLA	7	3	7	3	20
• Ohio State	0	21	7	14	42

- Date: September 11
- Location: Ohio Stadium, Columbus, OH
- Game attendance: 93,283
- TV announcers (ABC): Brad Nessler, Gary Danielson & Lynn Swann

Scoring summary
1	13:02	UCLA	Matt Stanley 67-yard pass from Drew Bennett (Chris Griffith kick)	UCLA 7-0
2	14:13	UCLA	Nate Fiske 35-yard field goal	UCLA 10-0
2	10:58	OSU	Michael Wiley 3-yard run (Dan Stultz kick)	UCLA 10-7
2	6:54	OSU	Ken-Yon Rambo 2-yard pass from Steve Bellisari (Dan Stultz kick)	OSU 14-10
2	0:56	OSU	Michael Wiley 5-yard run (Dan Stultz kick)	OSU 21-10
3	10:44	UCLA	DeShaun Foster 7-yard run (Chris Griffith kick)	OSU 21-17
3	0:03	OSU	Jamar Martin 3-yard run (Dan Stultz kick)	OSU 28-17
4	11:41	OSU	Ken-Yon Rambo 8-yard pass from Steve Bellisari (Dan Stultz kick)	OSU 35-17
4	9:30	UCLA	Chris Griffith 33-yard field goal	OSU 35-20
4	6:37	OSU	Jerry Westbrooks 8-yard run (Dan Stultz kick)	OSU 42-20

=== Purdue ===
Team	1	2	3	4	Total
Purdue	7	6	0	9	22
• Ohio St	7	0	10	8	25

- Date: October 9
- Location: Ohio Stadium, Columbus, OH
- Game attendance: 93,766
- TV announcers (ABC): Brent Musburger, Dan Fouts & Jack Arute

Scoring summary
Q1	12:15	OHST	Derek Combs 5 yard run (Dan Stultz kick)	OHST 7–0
Q1	8:03	OHST	Drew Brees 12 yard pass from Vinny Sutherland (Travis Dorsch kick)	Tie 7–7
Q2	12:43	PUR	Travis Dorsch 40 yard field goal	PUR 10–7
Q2	:59	PUR	Travis Dorsch 32 yard field goal	PUR 13–7
Q3	8:45	OHST	Darnell Sanders 7 yard pass from Michael Wiley (Dan Stultz kick)	OHST 14–13
Q3	4:24	OHST	Dan Stultz 45 yard field goal	OHST 17–13
Q4	14:10	PUR	Travis Dorsch 22 yard field goal	OHST 17–16
Q4	13:42	PUR	Montrell Lowe 5 yard run (two-point conversion failed)	PUR 22–17
Q4	5:13	OHST	Jonathan Wells 2 yard run (Michael Wiley run)	OHST 25–22

=== Iowa ===
Team	1	2	3	4	Total
Iowa	8	0	3	0	11
• Ohio State	7	14	14	6	41

- Date: October 30
- Location: Ohio Stadium, Columbus, OH
- Game attendance: 93,561
- TV announcers (ESPN+): Jim Barbar, Al Harris & Chris Miller

Scoring summary
Q1	12:25	IOWA	Kasper 18 yard pass from Mullen (Thein run)	IOWA 8–0
Q1	7:32	OHST	Wells 1 yard run (Stultz kick)	IOWA 8–7
Q2	14:48	OHST	Bellisari 18 yard run (Stultz kick)	OHST 14–8
Q2	8:35	OHST	Houser 3 yard pass from Bellisari (Stultz kick)	OHST 21–8
Q3	12:38	OHST	Wells 3 yard run (Stultz kick)	OHST 28–8
Q3	9:26	IOWA	Douglas 38 yard field goal	OHST 28–11
Q3	2:53	OHST	Rambo 40 yard pass from Bellisari (Stultz kick)	OHST 35–11
Q4	8:10	OHST	Provitt 41 yard pass from Moherman (kick failed)	OHST 41–11

- Ken-Yon Rambo 7 Rec, 179 Yds

== Roster ==
1999 Ohio State Buckeyes football team roster
Players
Coaches
Offense

Pos.	#	Name	Class
QB	8	Steve Bellisari	So
C	68	LeCharles Bentley	So
WR	80	Reggie Germany	Jr
QB	15	Scott McMullen	Fr
WR	4	Ken-Yon Rambo	Jr
TE	89	Darnell Sanders	So
C	77	Tyson Walter	So
RB	28	Jonathan Wells	So
RB	5	Michael Wiley	Sr
TE	84	Steve Wisniewski	Sr

Defense

Pos.	#	Name	Class
S	1	Gary Berry	Sr
DT	73	Joe Brown	Jr
LB	58	Courtland Bullard	So
S	2	Mike Doss	Fr
CB	20	Nate Clements	So
LB	32	Na'il Diggs	Sr
DT	79	Ryan Pickett	So
CB	19	Ahmed Plummer	Sr

Special teams

Pos.	#	Name	Class
LS	87	Kevin Houser	Sr

Head coach

- John Cooper

Coordinators/assistant coaches

- Bill Conley (TE/Rec. Coord.)
- Jim Heacock (DL)
- Fred Pagac (DC)
- Tim Salem (QB)
- Shawn Simms (DE)
- Tim Spencer (RB)
- Chuck Stobart (OC)
- Jon Tenuta (DB)

Legend

- (C) Team captain
- (S) Suspended
- (I) Ineligible
- Injured
- Redshirt

Roster
Last update: 1999-11-09

== 2000 NFL draftees ==
Player	Round	Pick	Position	NFL club
Ahmed Plummer	1	24	Defensive back	San Francisco 49ers
Na'il Diggs	4	98	Linebacker	Green Bay Packers
Gary Berry	4	126	Defensive back	Green Bay Packers
Michael Wiley	5	144	Running back	Dallas Cowboys
James Cotton	7	223	Linebacker	Chicago Bears
Kevin Houser	7	228	Center	New Orleans Saints
