= List of Ohio State Buckeyes starting quarterbacks =

This is an incomplete list of starting quarterbacks for the Ohio State Buckeyes football team of the NCAA Division I Football Bowl Subdivision. The list includes quarterbacks who started at least one regular-season game, listed in chronological order by season beginning in 2000.

Year	Name	GS	Record	First career start	Awards/honors	Ref
2026	Julian Sayin	7	6–1			
2026	Luke Fahey	3	1–2	October 31		
2025	Julian Sayin	14	12–2	August 30	Big Ten Freshman of the Year, Second-team All-Big Ten, Shaun Alexander Freshman of the Year, FBS completion percentage leader	
2024	Will Howard	16	14–2	August 31	CFP national champion, CFP National Championship Game offensive MVP, Cotton Bowl Classic offensive MVP, Third-team All-Big Ten	
2023	Kyle McCord	12	11–1		Third-team All-Big Ten	
2023	Devin Brown	1	0–1	December 29		
2022	C. J. Stroud	13	11–2		Second-team All-American, NCAA passer rating leader, Big Ten Offensive Player of the Year, Big Ten Quarterback of the Year, First-team All-Big Ten	
2021	C. J. Stroud	12	10–2	September 2	Third-team All-American, Big Ten Offensive Player of the Year, Big Ten Quarterback of the Year, Big Ten Freshman of the Year, First-team All-Big Ten	
2021	Kyle McCord	1	1–0	September 25		
2020	Justin Fields	8	7–1		Big Ten Most Valuable Player, Big Ten Offensive Player of the Year, Big Ten Quarterback of the Year, First-team All-Big Ten	
2019	Justin Fields	14	13–1	August 31	Second-team All-American, Big Ten Offensive Player of the Year, Big Ten Quarterback of the Year, First-team All-Big Ten	
2018	Dwayne Haskins	14	13–1	September 1	Third-team All-American, NCAA passing yards leader, NCAA passing touchdowns leader, Big Ten Most Valuable Player, Sammy Baugh Trophy, Chic Harley Award, Kellen Moore Award	
2017	J. T. Barrett	14	12–2		Kellen Moore Award, Big Ten Quarterback of the Year, First-team All-Big Ten	
2016	J. T. Barrett	13	11–2		Big Ten Most Valuable Player, Big Ten Quarterback of the Year, First-team All-Big Ten	
2015	J. T. Barrett	5	4–1			
2015	Cardale Jones	8	8–0			
2014	J. T. Barrett	12	11–1	August 30	CFP national champion, Third-team All-American, Big Ten Quarterback of the Year, Big Ten Freshman of the Year, First-team All-Big Ten	
2014	Cardale Jones	3	3–0	December 6	CFP national champion	
2013	Braxton Miller	12	10–2		Big Ten Most Valuable Player, Big Ten Offensive Player of the Year, Big Ten Quarterback of the Year, First-team All-Big Ten	
2013	Kenny Guiton	2	2–0	September 14		
2012	Braxton Miller	12	12–0		Second-team All-American, Big Ten Most Valuable Player, Big Ten Offensive Player of the Year, Big Ten Quarterback of the Year, First-team All-Big Ten	
2011	Joe Bauserman	3	2–1	September 3		
2011	Braxton Miller	10	4–6	September 24	Big Ten Freshman of the Year	
2010	Terrelle Pryor	13	12–1		Sugar Bowl MVP	
2009	Terrelle Pryor	13	11–2		Rose Bowl MVP	
2008	Todd Boeckman	4	2–2			
2008	Terrelle Pryor	9	8–1	September 20	Big Ten Freshman of the Year	
2007	Todd Boeckman	13	11–2	September 1		
2006	Troy Smith	13	12–1		Heisman Trophy, Unanimous All-American	
2005	Justin Zwick	2	1–1			
2005	Troy Smith	10	9–1			
2004	Justin Zwick	7	4–3	September 4		
2004	Troy Smith	5	4–1	October 23		
2003	Craig Krenzel	11	9–2		William V. Campbell Trophy	
2003	Scott McMullen	2	2–0			
2002	Craig Krenzel	14	14–0		BCS national champion, Second-team All-Big Ten	
2001	Steve Bellisari	9	6–3			
2001	Scott McMullen	1	0–1	November 17		
2001	Craig Krenzel	2	1–1	November 24		
2000	Steve Bellisari	12	8–4			

== Team passer rankings ==
Ohio State Buckeyes quarterbacks ranked by career starts since 2000. Pre-2002 bowl game statistics are excluded. Starts and wins are included; passing statistics are not.

Name	GS	W–L–T	Comp	Att	Pct	Yards	TD	Int
J. T. Barrett	44	38–6	769	1,211	63.5	9,434	104	30
Terrelle Pryor	35	31–4	477	783	60.9	6,177	57	26
Braxton Miller	34	26–8	396	667	59.4	5,295	52	17
Troy Smith	28	25–3	420	670	62.7	5,720	54	13
Craig Krenzel	27	24–3	326	574	56.8	4,473	28	20
