= 2002 Outback Bowl =

- 16th Outback Bowl
| Ohio State Buckeyes | South Carolina Gamecocks |
| (7–4) | (8–3) |
| Big Ten | SEC |
| 28 | 31 |
| Head coach: Jim Tressel | Head coach: Lou Holtz |
| AP / Coaches / BCS; 22 / 23 / NR | AP / Coaches / BCS; 14 / 14 / 14 |
| | 1 | 2 | 3 | 4 | Total |
|---|---|---|---|---|---|
| Ohio State | 0 | 0 | 7 | 21 | 28 |
| South Carolina | 0 | 14 | 14 | 3 | 31 |
- Date: January 1, 2002
- Season: 2001
- Stadium: Raymond James Stadium
- Location: Tampa, Florida
- MVP: Phil Petty (South Carolina QB)
- Referee: Alberto Riveron (C-USA)

United States TV coverage
- Network: ESPN
- Announcers: Ron Franklin, Mike Gottfried, Adrian Karsten

The 2002 Outback Bowl featured the South Carolina Gamecocks, and the Ohio State Buckeyes. South Carolina had comfortably defeated Ohio State in the previous year's game, 24–7. This was the 16th edition of the Outback Bowl.

== Summary ==
South Carolina scored first, when running back Andrew Pinnock scored on a 1-yard touchdown run to open up a 7–0 second quarter lead. Quarterback Phil Petty found Brian Scott for a 7-yard touchdown pass, to increase the lead to 14–0. In the third quarter, Phil Petty found Andrea Gause for a 50-yard touchdown pass to increase the lead to 20–0. Andrew Pinnock made the lead seemingly insurmountable when he rushed 10 yards for a touchdown, to put USC up 28–0, late in the third quarter.

Late in the third quarter, quarterback Steve Bellisari rushed 2 yards for a touchdown to put Ohio State on the board, 28–7. Early in the fourth quarter, he found Darnell Sanders for a 16-yard touchdown pass to trim the margin to 28–14. Ohio State was driving again with 6 minutes left, when Belisari fumbled a snap at South Carolina's 23-yard line. On the very next play, South Carolina gave it right back, when they fumbled, giving Ohio State new life.

Steve Belisari threw a 22-yard pass to Michael Jenkins, and Jonathan Wells took a handoff 1 yard for a touchdown, bringing Ohio State to 28–21. South Carolina went three-and-out on its next possession, giving the ball to Ohio State. Steve Bellisari engineered a perfect drive, going 5-for-5 passing for 63 yards, including a 9-yard touchdown pass to Sanders with 1:54 left, to tie the game, 28–28. Ohio State intercepted a South Carolina pass, but Belisari threw an interception, and South Carolina got the ball back in good field position. Daniel Weaver kicked the winning field goal for South Carolina as time expired, giving the Gamecocks a narrow 31–28 victory.
