= 2003 Fiesta Bowl =

College football bowl game and BCS National Championship

2003 Tostitos Fiesta Bowl
- BCS National Championship Game; 32nd Fiesta Bowl
Ohio State Buckeyes	Miami Hurricanes
(13–0)	(12–0)
Big Ten	Big East
31	24
Head coach: Jim Tressel	Head coach: Larry Coker
AP / Coaches / BCS; 2 / 2 / 2	AP / Coaches / BCS; 1 / 1 / 1
	1	2	3	4	OT	2OT	Total
Ohio State	0	14	3	0	7	7	31
Miami	7	0	7	3	7	0	24
- Date: January 3, 2003
- Season: 2002
- Stadium: Sun Devil Stadium
- Location: Tempe, Arizona
- MVP: Craig Krenzel, QB; Mike Doss, S
- Favorite: Miami by 11.5
- National anthem: The Singing Sergeants
- Referee: Randy Christal (Big 12)
- Halftime show: Ohio State and Miami Marching Bands
- Attendance: 77,505

United States TV coverage
- Network: ABC
- Announcers: Keith Jackson (play-by-play); Dan Fouts (analyst); Lynn Swann (sideline); Todd Harris (sideline)
- Nielsen ratings: 29.1 million viewers; 17.2 rating (Pre Game: 19.7 million/11.9 rating)

The 2003 Tostitos Fiesta Bowl was a college football bowl game designated as the Bowl Championship Series (BCS) National Championship Game for the 2002 NCAA Division I-A football season. It took place on January 3, 2003 at Sun Devil Stadium in Tempe, Arizona, pitting the Ohio State Buckeyes, co-champions of the Big Ten Conference, against the heavily favored Miami Hurricanes, defending national champions and champions of the Big East Conference. Led by head coach Jim Tressel, the Buckeyes defeated the Hurricanes in double overtime by a final score of 31 - 24, winning the program its first consensus national championship since the 1968 season.

In the midst of a resurgence after a period of turmoil in the 1990s, Miami had won the previous season's national championship in dominant fashion under new head coach Larry Coker and entered the Fiesta Bowl with a 34-game win streak. Ohio State, meanwhile, had narrowly missed national championship opportunities over the past decade, and their most recently claimed championship had come over thirty years prior. The two teams represented a contrast of playing styles: Ohio State played an older variation of power football that emphasized running and dominant defense, while Miami used the speed of their skill position players to overwhelm opponents. Leading up to the game, there was speculation as to whether the Buckeyes would be able to contend with the speed advantage of the Hurricanes, who were installed as double digit favorites.

Following the game, controversy arose surrounding the validity of a crucial pass interference penalty during the first overtime period, without which a Hurricanes victory would have resulted. The trajectories of the two programs subsequently diverged after the season: Ohio State maintained national competitiveness, while Miami fell from their elite status, eventually becoming mired in a scandal. Considering the differing courses of the two programs, the game and its controversial ending have become known as pivotal moments in the greater history of American college football. As such, it is often referred to as one of the greatest college football games ever played.

== Background ==
=== Miami Hurricanes ===
Prior to the 1980s, the Miami Hurricanes were mostly irrelevant on the national stage of college football. The program broke through during the 1983 season, when they won their first national championship under head coach Howard Schnellenberger. Adopting a brash, confident, and confrontational identity, the Hurricanes program went on to win three more national championships through the 1991 season with head coaches Jimmy Johnson and Dennis Erickson. In less than a decade, the program had become a college football powerhouse.

Toward the end of Erickson's tenure, Miami's dominance over the sport began to wane. After a national championship loss to Alabama in the Sugar Bowl, Miami ended the following season with three losses for the first time since 1984, including the worst bowl game defeat in program history to the Arizona Wildcats in the Fiesta Bowl. Another bowl loss followed the 1994 season, after which Erickson left in the face of a scandal that resulted in a guilty plea in federal court from an academic advisor for falsifying Pell Grant applications on behalf football players. His successor, Butch Davis, inherited the penalties of the ensuing NCAA investigation, which determined that the university had provided improper benefits to players and failed to properly institute drug-testing procedures.

In 1997, the Hurricanes posted their first losing season since 1979, but the program began to rebound in the following years. After the 2000 season, the Hurricanes were controversially left out of the national championship game in favor of the Florida State Seminoles and finished the year as the number two team. Davis left after the season to take the head coaching job for the Cleveland Browns, and Miami promoted offensive coordinator Larry Coker. The Hurricanes were anticipated as one of the best teams in the country heading into 2001 and retained their number two ranking. They did not lose a game that year, winning the program's fifth national championship in the Rose Bowl over the Nebraska Cornhuskers. Back on top of college football, some sportswriters predicted that another era of Hurricanes dominance over the sport was looming.

The Hurricanes entered the 2002 season as the number one team in the country. Several star players returned from the previous season, including quarterback Ken Dorsey, wide receiver Andre Johnson, and linebackers Jonathan Vilma and D.J. Williams. Breakout star Willis McGahee led the rushing attack and amassed over two thousand yards from scrimmage. The Hurricanes won all their regular season games in mostly dominant fashion, although they struggled in a few games against overmatched opponents. Due to their membership in the less competitive Big East conference, some observers questioned the strength of their schedule, including Ohio State safety Will Allen. The Hurricanes were nonetheless favored by eleven and a half points entering the Fiesta Bowl, and they had won thirty-four straight games dating back to the second game of the 2000 season.

=== Ohio State Buckeyes ===
Ohio State, by contrast, were a historical blue blood trying to return to national prominence. The program claimed six national championships at the time, but the latest had come thirty-two years prior following the 1970 season. The rest of that decade was marked by upset losses that prevented the Buckeyes from winning a championship, and longtime head coach Woody Hayes was fired after the 1978 season after he punched an opposing player in a loss to the Clemson Tigers in the Gator Bowl. Although new coach Earle Bruce nearly led the Buckeyes to a national championship the following year, a string of three-loss seasons ensued until Bruce was fired during the underwhelming 1987 season. Ohio State then hired Arizona State head coach John Cooper before the next year.

The Buckeyes returned to title contention under Cooper, but another championship remained elusive. In a tenure defined by losses to the archrival Michigan Wolverines, Ohio State narrowly missed out on qualifying for numerous national championship games following close defeats near the end of seasons. In 1998, Ohio State lost in a major upset to the Michigan State Spartans, a devastating defeat that prevented a birth in the inaugural BCS title game. After finishing unranked the next two years, Ohio State fired Cooper following the 2000 season and hired Youngstown State head coach Jim Tressel. In his first season, Tressel led the Buckeyes to a 7-5 record and a birth in the Outback Bowl, where they lost to the South Carolina Gamecocks 28 – 31.

Nonetheless, the Buckeyes had high expectations for the 2002 season. Freshman standout Maurice Clarett highlighted their rushing attack, while quarterback Craig Krenzel and wideout Michael Jenkins led the passing game. Combined with a dominant defense, the Buckeyes did not lose a game during the regular season, although the offense at times proved anemic. They won six games that year by fewer than seven points, including a famous 10 – 6 win over unranked Purdue that has come to be known as the Holy Buckeye game. The Buckeyes needed overtime to beat an Illinois team that won fewer than half their games, and they only sealed a win against the Cincinnati Bearcats, a Group of Five school, with a last minute interception.

Compared to Miami's dominance, Ohio State looked like the inferior opponent. In the hours before the game, Jackie MacMullan declared that "Miami's going to win this game, and they're probably going to win by around two touchdowns" during a segment on the ESPN television show Pardon the Interruption. Co-host Tony Kornheiser questioned the Buckeyes' ability to keep up with the Hurricanes: "[Miami has] got all the speed, I believe, on their side of the ball... What happens when Ohio State sees speed like they've never seen?" Fellow ESPN analyst Trev Alberts stated, "[Ohio State is] not going to beat Miami. If Miami loses, it will be because Miami beat itself. I don't see that happening." Sportscaster Tim Brando predicted that Miami would win by a score of 48 – 10.

== Game summary ==
=== First quarter ===
The Miami Hurricanes won the coin toss for first possession options and elected to defer their choice until the 2nd half kickoff. The Buckeyes chose to receive the kickoff and Miami decided to defend the north goal. The kickoff resulted in a touchback but the Buckeyes were flagged for having 12 men on the field, moving the spot of the ball back to the Buckeye 15-yard line. The Buckeyes' first series resulted in a three-and-out, and Buckeye punter Andy Groom's 56-yard punt resulted in Miami beginning their first possession on their own 20.

During the first down, the Hurricanes' quarterback Ken Dorsey was sacked for a loss of 3 yards. Running back Willis McGahee was tackled on the second down in the backfield for a loss of 2 yards. On third and 15, Dorsey completed a 20-yard pass to Andre Johnson for a 1st down. A couple of plays later, Dorsey again completed a pass to Andre Johnson for 11 yards. The next play saw Dorsey sacked again, this time for a 5-yard loss. The Miami offense failed to gain a first down and punter Freddie Capshaw punted the ball 43 yards. Ohio State received the ball on its one-yard line.

After three downs, the Buckeyes punted. Groom kicked the ball 44 yards where Roscoe Parrish made a fair catch at the Miami 48-yard line. Miami's drive started out slowly with a 1-yard loss on a run by McGahee, but the next play saw Dorsey throw a 28-yard first down pass to Kellen Winslow, Jr. Three plays later, Dorsey sidestepped blitzing safety Donnie Nickey and threw to Parrish for a 25-yard touchdown to put Miami up 7-0 (after Todd Sievers's extra point) with 4:09 left in the first quarter.

Ohio State's Maurice Hall returned the ensuing kickoff for 15 yards. On the first play from scrimmage, Buckeye quarterback Craig Krenzel threw an interception to Miami safety Sean Taylor. On its first play after this, the Miami quarterback completed a 14-yard pass to Andre Johnson for another first down. McGahee was tackled twice for a net loss of 4 yards, and Dorsey's pass on third-and-15 was 2 yards short of a first down. On fourth down Miami's Capshaw punted 44 yards for a touchback. The Buckeyes took over at their 20-yard line, but got a false start penalty, moving them to their 15-yard line. The Buckeyes did not get a touchdown before the quarter ended.

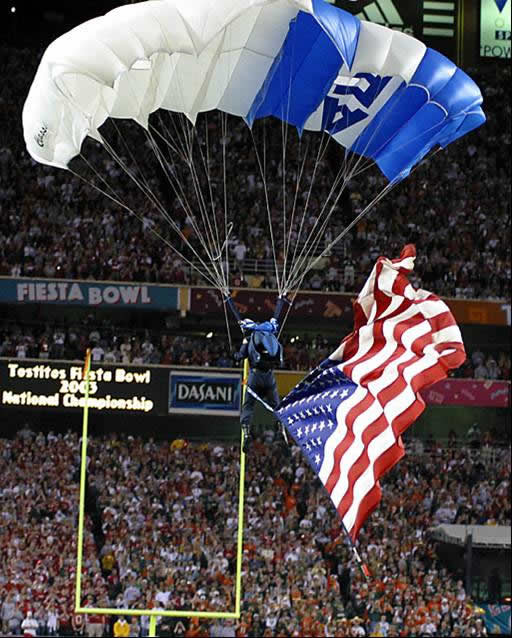
Parachute demonstration during the pregame show

=== Second quarter ===
After a quick first down at the end of the 1st quarter the Ohio State drive stalled as Maurice Clarett was tackled for no gain, and then a 7-yard loss, on the next two plays. Groom punted for 63 yards to the Miami 7-yard line where Parrish returned it 6 yards.

The Hurricanes moved the ball after a 10-yard holding penalty for another first down. Ohio State responded after the mental error when cornerback Dustin Fox intercepted Ken Dorsey's pass, which was intended for Parrish, at the Miami 49 and returned it 12 yards.

Ohio State picked up a first down in 2 plays but come up short on a long 3rd and 12 to make it 4th and 1. The Buckeyes uncharacteristically decided to fake the field goal attempt and have kick holder Andy Groom (otherwise a punter) carry the ball on an option, but the Buckeyes were stopped for no gain on the play and turned the ball over on downs.

Miami began their next possession with another penalty. The Hurricanes were called for an illegal formation penalty for 5 yards, but Dorsey quickly rebounded as he completed a 14-yard pass to Ethenic Sands for a Miami 1st down. Dorsey again completed a pass on the next play to Jason Geathers for a 4-yard gain. The Hurricanes tried to pass two more times, but the first pass was incomplete and the second was intercepted on a deflection by Buckeye safety Mike Doss, who returned the ball 35 yards to the Miami 17-yard line.

A few plays later Krenzel threw 8 yards for a first down to Chris Vance. Ohio State proceeded to move the ball to the 2-yard line, with the help of a Miami offsides penalty. Krenzel carried the ball into the endzone on 4th and 1 from the 2 for a touchdown. Mike Nugent kicked the PAT to tie the score at 7 - 7 with a little over 2 minutes to go in the first half.

Nugent's kickoff after the score went to the back of the endzone for a touchback. On the Hurricane's first play from scrimmage Ken Dorsey was sacked and fumbled the ball. The Buckeye's Darrion Scott recovered the fumble on the Miami 14-yard line. 2 plays later, and again with the help of a Miami offsides penalty, Maurice Clarett ran for a 7-yard touchdown. After another successful PAT by Nugent the Buckeyes were up 14-7.

Nugent kicked off for another touchback, and Miami chose to run out the clock. The Buckeyes led at half time, 14–7.

=== Third quarter ===
On the first play of the second half, Ohio State kicker Mike Nugent sent the ball into the endzone for yet another touchback. Miami began with the ball on the 20-yard line but fell short on a 3rd and 3 to make it 4th and 1 and elected to punt. Freddie Capshaw punted the ball 43 yards and the ball was downed at the Ohio State 28-yard line.

The Buckeyes began the drive with good momentum as they handed off to Clarett twice, resulting in a 4- and 10-yard gain respectively and a Buckeye first down. Ohio State was flagged for a 5-yard offsides penalty on the next play. The Buckeyes were stopped twice in a row to bring up a 3rd and 15.

On third down, Krenzel threw a deep ball to Chris Gamble for a 57-yard reception to the Miami 6-yard line and an Ohio State first down. Krenzel then threw an interception to Sean Taylor who returned it 28 yards. However, the ball was stripped by Maurice Clarett causing a fumble which was recovered by Clarett. The turnover resulted in 3 points for OSU when Nugent converted a field goal that put the Buckeyes up 17–7.

On the following kickoff the Hurricanes' Andre Johnson returned the ball 39 yards before getting tackled. Again, the Buckeyes defense held Miami to a 3 and out and forced a punt. Capshaw had a 43-yard punt down to the Ohio State 10-yard line where Chris Gamble fielded the ball for a 1-yard gain. Antrel Rolle was called for a kick catch interference penalty of 10 yards on the punt.

Ohio State began their next drive at their own 21-yard line, and only moved the ball 4 yards before calling in Groom to punt the ball 30 yards out of bounds. Miami's next possession consisted of a couple of big plays including a 23-yard reception and a 7-yard reception by Winslow from Dorsey. Miami then faced 1st and goal from the Ohio State 9-yard line. Willis McGahee ran 9 yards for a Miami touchdown. Sievers PAT kick was good and the score became 17–14, Buckeyes.

Sievers kickoff resulted in a touchback and gave the ball to Ohio State at their own 20-yard line with 2:11 left in the 3rd quarter. Clarett got the ball on 1st and 10 and was tackled for no gain. Krenzel ran for 4 yards making it 3rd and 6, and then took the ball himself once more for a 3-yard gain on the final play of the 3rd quarter with the score 17–14 in favor of the Buckeyes.

=== Fourth quarter ===
The 4th Quarter started out with a 49-yard punt out of bounds by Andy Groom giving Miami the ball at their own 24-yard line. Miami once again put a drive together earning 3 first downs including a 9-yard rush by McGahee who was injured and out for the rest of the game after the play. McGahee's injury was caused by a shoulder leading hit by safety Will Allen. The tackle ruptured all three ligaments in McGahee's knee, putting his career in doubt. (McGahee subsequently recovered from his injury and went on to a successful professional football career.)

The next plays were a Dorsey completion to Ethenic Sands for 9 yards, and a Dorsey completion to Winslow for a gain of 11 yards. The Canes were then held forced to bring out kicker Todd Sievers to attempt a 54-yard field goal. Sievers's attempt was wide right and the Buckeyes took over on downs.

The Buckeyes put a drive together, also earning 3 first downs including a 10-yard completion from Krenzel to Michael Jenkins, a 12-yard completion from Krenzel to Gamble, and a 6-yard rush by Clarett. However, the Miami defense held and forced Ohio State to try a field goal. Nugent's attempt at a 42-yard field goal missed the uprights wide right. Miami then took over the ball at its own 25 with 6:36 left in the game.

On the first play of the Miami drive, Dorsey hooked up with Kellen Winslow for an 11-yard gain and a first down. Jarrett Payton then rushed for 5 yards before Dorsey and Winslow hooked up yet again for a 10-yard gain and another Miami 1st down. Miami was stopped two plays in a row bringing up 3rd and 8 when Dorsey passed to Parrish for a 34-yard completion, but Parrish fumbled the ball at the hands of cornerback Dustin Fox. Nickelback Will Allen recovered the fumble for the Buckeyes.

Krenzel then rushed for one more 1st down on a 4-yard gain until they were held by the Miami D and were forced to punt once again. On 3rd and 6 a catch by Chris Gamble was ruled incomplete due to his being out of bounds (even though replay showed Gamble probably caught the ball inbounds). TV replays also showed that Gamble was seemingly held on the play by a Miami defender, and Krenzel may have been hit late. However, TV replays also indicate that Ohio State might not have snapped the ball before the play clock expired, and possibly should have been called for delay of game, which would have turned the third and six into 3rd and 11. Furthermore, Ohio State would not have actually been able to knee out the clock if this had been ruled in bounds (or ruled defensive holding or a late hit), because there was 2:19 left on the clock and Miami still had one timeout. Under replay rules that were passed before the 2005 and 2006 seasons, replay officials would have been allowed to review if Gamble was in bounds, but would not have been allowed to review the play for defensive holding or a late hit. The Buckeyes were forced to punt and Groom punted the ball 44 yards.

Miami's returner, Parrish, ran the ball back 50 yards before being tackled by Groom and Doss. Miami started their drive at the Buckeye 26-yard line with 2:02 left in the game. Some Ohio State fans claim that Miami should have been called for a block in the back at about the Miami 40 yard line, which would have meant the Hurricanes would have started the possession from about the Miami 30 yard line rather than the Ohio State 26 yard line. Miami ran 3 plays for a total of 3 yards and decide to take a timeout on 4th and 7 with 3 seconds left in the game. Miami elected to have Sievers attempt a 40-yard field goal. Tressel called a timeout to try to ice the kicker. Ohio State then used its last timeout in a further attempt to rattle Sievers. The 40 yard attempt was successful, however, and tied the score at 17 with no time remaining in regulation play, forcing the game into overtime.

=== First overtime ===
Ohio State won the toss at the start of overtime and chose to be on defense first. Miami started their OT drive out slow, but on 2nd and 10, Dorsey completed a 9-yard pass to Andre Johnson to make it 3rd and 1 from the 16-yard line. Jarrett Payton then rushed for 8 yards to give Miami another 1st down and a 1st and goal from the OSU 8-yard line. Two plays later, Dorsey hooked up with Kellen Winslow in the endzone for a 7-yard touchdown pass. Pass interference was called on the defense, but the penalty was declined. Miami led 24–17 at this point, forcing the Buckeyes to score a touchdown on their next possession to keep the game alive.

On the Buckeyes' turn to try to score from the Miami 25-yard line, Krenzel came up with a 5-yard rush on the first play. Ohio State had a 2nd and 5 on the Miami 20-yard line and a false start penalty was called against the Buckeyes bringing them back 5 yards to the 25. On 2nd and 10 Krenzel got sacked for a 4-yard loss bringing up 3rd and 14. Krenzel then threw an incomplete pass to Clarett to make it 4th and 14 and their last chance to get a 1st down. Krenzel came through and completed a 17-yard pass to Jenkins for a 1st down on the Miami 12-yard line.

Krenzel then threw another incomplete pass to Jenkins which brought up 2nd and 10 where Krenzel took the ball himself and rushed for 7 yards down to the Miami 5-yard line. The third down was an incomplete pass by Krenzel, which brought up 4th down and 3. Krenzel attempted a pass to Gamble, but the ball bounced off Gamble's hands and was called an incomplete pass by the line judge. The Miami fans and team, believing the game to be over, began to rush the field. However, Terry Porter, a field judge had thrown a late flag in the end zone. The controversial penalty was defensive pass interference, called on Miami defender Glenn Sharpe. As a result, Ohio State received the ball on the 2-yard line with an automatic first down. With a fresh set of downs, Krenzel rushed for a 1-yard touchdown on 3rd down. Nugent's kick was good and tied the score at 24 sending the game into a second overtime.

=== Second overtime ===
In the second overtime, the teams switched possession order, giving the ball first to Ohio State. The Buckeyes started strong with Lydell Ross rushing for a 9-yard gain on 1st down. 3rd and 1 came up and Krenzel rushed for 5 yards and an Ohio State 1st down. For 1st and 10 on the Miami 11, Krenzel completed a 6-yard pass to Jenkins which brought up 2nd and 4 on the Miami 5-yard line. Krenzel then handed off the ball to Maurice Clarett for a 5-yard rushing touchdown putting Ohio State up 31–24 after a successful Nugent PAT.

Miami had to score a touchdown and then either kick the PAT to tie the game and send it to a 3rd overtime, or go for a 2-point conversion and the win. The Hurricanes drew a couple of blanks to put them in a 4th and 3 situation where Dorsey completed a 7-yard pass to Winslow for a 1st down. A facemask penalty was called on Ohio State during the play to make it 1st and 5 for Miami from the Buckeye 6-yard line. Ken Dorsey then threw an incomplete pass to Andre Johnson, but a pass interference call on a Buckeyes defender gave Miami a 1st and goal from the 2-yard line. The Buckeye defense held Miami to only one yard in the next 3 plays to bring up a big 4th and goal on the 1-yard line. Ken Dorsey threw a pass as he was being hit by linebacker Cie Grant; it was incomplete, ending the game with Ohio State winning the BCS National Championship 31–24.

=== Scoring summary ===
1st Quarter

- Miami – Roscoe Parrish 25-yard pass from Ken Dorsey (Todd Sievers kick) 4:09 – UM 7, OSU 0

2nd Quarter

- Ohio State – Craig Krenzel 1-yard run (Mike Nugent kick) 2:28 – OSU 7, UM 7
- Ohio State – Maurice Clarett 7-yard run (Nugent kick) 1:10 – OSU 14, UM 7

3rd Quarter

- Ohio State – Nugent 44-yard field goal 8:33 – OSU 17, UM 7
- Miami – Willis McGahee 9-yard run (Sievers kick) 2:11 – OSU 17, UM 14

4th Quarter

- Miami – Sievers 40-yard field goal 0:00 – UM 17, OSU 17

1st Overtime

- Miami – Kellen Winslow, Jr. 7-yard pass from Dorsey (Sievers kick) – UM 24, OSU 17
- Ohio State – Krenzel 1-yard run (Nugent kick) – OSU 24, UM 24

2nd Overtime

- Ohio State – Clarett 5-yard run (Nugent kick) – OSU 31, UM 24

== Pass interference controversy ==
The play in question. Frame two depicts Gamble releasing on his route as Sharpe initiates contact, known as "jamming" the receiver. At frame five, play-by-play announcer Keith Jackson states "That could have been holding there" during the instant replay portion of the television broadcast.

The pass interference penalty called against Miami in the first overtime period fell under immediate scrutiny, igniting a controversy that has helped to define the game's legacy. During instant replay analysis after the call on the field, Fouts and Jackson discussed the merits of the penalty, which Fouts thrice proclaimed as a "bad call." Jackson suggested that there may have been defensive holding on the play, to which Fouts responded, "They called pass interference, Keith."

An alternate angle of the play that did not depict the initial contact by Sharpe. This angle served as the primary focus during the television broadcast.

The play had proceeded thus: at the snap, Sharpe jammed Gamble at the line of scrimmage as he ran a fade route. Attempting to escape, Gamble broke off his route while Sharpe maintained contact. At the top of the route, both Gamble and Sharpe jumped for the ball, which bounced out of Gamble's outstretched arms; the predominant camera angle used for instant replay focused on this jump for the ball at the end of the play. The line judge signaled incomplete, but after a delay of several seconds, field judge Terry Porter threw a penalty flag. The delay had allowed for members of the Miami sideline to storm the field in celebration, and they had to clear the field before play could resume. Initially signaling for defensive holding, Porter revised his signal to pass interference before the call was announced.

=== Criticisms of the call ===
Coverage of the penalty was extensive after the game, as numerous sportswriters criticized the call and its influence on the outcome. In his article for Sports Illustrated, Rick Reilly said, "I think Porter choked. I think he didn't know what to call, and so he did the stupidest thing possible. Maybe he felt the coming wrath of a stadium that was 90% Ohio State red and started wondering if he'd make it out of there with both his kidneys." Writing for The Miami Herald, Dan Le Batard called the penalty "on the cusp of corrupt," noting that an official with a better view of the play did not call a penalty. "You don't make that call," Le Batard asserted, "not in any situation, and certainly not in that one." Months after the game, the Orlando Sentinel published, "The Republic of Texas had 'Remember the Alamo.' The Republic of Miami has 'Remember Terry Porter.' He's the ref who threw the pass-interference flag that cost UM the national title."

Much of the criticism focused on Porter's delay in throwing the penalty flag. In a retrospective piece, Dennis Dodd of CBS Sports observed, "It appears that Miami's Glenn Sharpe did hold Chris Gamble off the line, but that would make the call even more ridiculous. That means that Porter threw the flag a good 10 seconds after the snap." Reilly expressed a similar sentiment: "In all my years of watching overweight, bespectacled guys in striped shirts fling flags after pass plays, I've never seen a flag flung so flagrantly late. You felt like you could've assembled a ship in a bottle in that time." Le Batard called the penalty "terribly late," continuing to note, "It came so long after the end zone contact being alleged that UM players were dancing at midfield before most of them were even aware there was a flag on the field." Ken Dorsey also criticized the delay, stating, "My whole thing is good calls and bad calls happen, but just make the call. Don't wait as long as you did to throw the flag."

=== Defenses of Porter ===
Nonetheless, there were a number of analysts who defended Porter, contending that he made the correct call on the field. Despite his later criticism, Dodd defended the call in the months following the game, including Porter's delay in throwing the penalty flag: "Whether it takes five seconds or five minutes, they teach officials, above all, to get the call right. Porter did." The staff of the Toledo Blade noted that the predominant replay angle used by the ABC broadcast only showed the play after the penalty had taken place, which skewed viewers' perceptions. Dodd concurred: "The problem is, few people saw the actual infraction. All the replays focused on Sharpe jumping for a ball in the end zone intended for Ohio State receiver Chris Gamble. . . . At the line of scrimmage, Sharpe tried to 'jam' Gamble and impeded his progress." Dave Parry, then the Big Ten Conference supervisor of officials, also affirmed this stance: "When the camera showed it they didn't see the line of scrimmage. They saw the downfield play about 7 or 8 yards."

Other sportswriters pushed back against the controversy itself. Ray McNulty, a sports columnist for Treasure Coast Newspapers, decried that the referees were being blamed for the loss. "Let's not hear any loser talk about being robbed by the officials. It WAS pass interference. Ohio State's Chris Gamble got mugged in the end zone while the ball was in the air." Berry Tramel of The Oklahoman criticized the reactions from Fouts and Reilly in particular:

[Porter] rose to the occasion. Despite volcanic eruptions from the media, particularly ABC's Dan Fouts, who set the fire by immediately ripping the call Porter got it right. . . . Porter's crime was the delay. When Ohio State quarterback Craig Krenzel's pass fell incomplete, Porter didn't throw the flag immediately. He wishes he had, it would have saved him all kinds of grief from Rick Reilly and Miami fans, but what would it have changed? One second, four seconds. Porter got it right.

The National Association of Sports Officials also criticized Reilly in a letter to Sports Illustrated that stated, "Not once—not once!—did Reilly have the decency to state a fact: The call was correct. Terry Porter took his time and got the play right."

Addressing the delay, Porter said he wanted to make sure that the call was correct. “I saw [Sharpe] holding [Gamble] prior to the ball being in the air. He was still holding him, pulling him down while the ball was in the air. I replayed it in my mind. I wanted to make double sure that it was the right call.” An analysis by the Big 12 Conference concluded that Sharpe committed four penalties on the play, with two instances of defensive holding and two instances of pass interference. In 2007, Porter's call was selected by Referee Magazine as one of the 18 best calls in sports history, and the penalty was also the focus of the ESPN Show The Top 5 Reasons You Can't Blame... in an episode titled "The Top 5 Reasons You Can't Blame the Referees for Miami losing the 2003 Fiesta Bowl."

=== Team reactions ===
Numerous Miami players and coaches have expressed their displeasure toward the call. Coker stated, "Whether it be a good call, a bad call, it was a poorly timed call, you know? I just think you don't make that call at that stage of the game." Sharpe denies that he committed a penalty and criticized Porter for refusing to admit that he made a mistake. Linebacker Jonathan Vilma and former tight end Jeremy Shockey both called the penalty "bullshit," and linebacker DJ Williams said that he felt like "part of my legacy had been stolen from me." Williams, former wide receiver Santana Moss, former tackle Bryant McKinnie, and assistant coach Don Soldinger each noted that the initial appearance of victory took Miami out of the competitive mindset, shifting game momentum and forcing them to refocus. Nonetheless, Miami safety Sean Taylor dismissed the call's influence on the game, stating, "Officials make the calls. That wasn't a turning point. We should have never been in that position."

For the Buckeyes, Chris Gamble insisted that Sharpe interfered with him. "He was all in my facemask. He was holding me. After the play, I knew I was going to see a flag. (But) it took a while." Craig Krenzel agreed. "I saw a lot of contact going on in the corner," he said. "I think it was the right call." Interviewed after the game, Tressel said, "I thought there was interference ... it was good to see that guy come up from the back of the end zone and make what I felt was a good call."

=== Retrospective views ===
Popular perception of the penalty has remained negative. Retrospectives for the website Bleacher Report have been particularly critical. Brian Scott labeled it the worst call of the BCS era and excoriated Porter for making it in such a pivotal moment. Amy Daughters called the penalty "dubious" and "questionable at best," and Benny Vargas wrote, "Simply stated, Porter blew the call. To say that Gamble was being held the entire play is absolutely ridiculous. But that's what happens when you have to cover [yourself]. You come up with crazy excuses and ways to blame others for your gaff." In his preview for a rematch in 2010, Danny Flynn concurred:

Dan Fouts said it best. The announcer was right on the money with his description of the pass interference call levied against Miami cornerback Glenn Sharpe. The call, considered one of the worst in college football history, changed the outcome of 2003 Fiesta Bowl and changed the course of college football.

Writing for ESPN in 2020, Mark Schlabach stated, "I think you might argue that it was the worst call of all time"; his co-author for the article, Bill Connelly, said he was "OK with the call," but not with the delay. Andrea Adelson, also for ESPN, called it "perhaps the most questionable pass interference call in college football history." Jared Shanker of The Patriot-News ranked the call as the third worst of all time.

=== Missed call in regulation ===
The uncalled holding penalty against Kelly Jennings had the potential to end the game in regulation time.

Other commentators have noted an officiating error in Miami's favor that could have otherwise ended the game in regulation, preventing the overtime controversy. With two minutes and eighteen seconds left in the game, Craig Krenzel threw a pass to Chris Gamble on third down that was ruled incomplete. Both Fouts and Jackson noted that Kelly Jennings, a Miami defensive back, committed a holding penalty on the play that Fouts said "should've been called," and audible boos from the crowd could be heard on the broadcast during the instant replay analysis. Both announcers also noted how close Gamble came to catching the incomplete pass.

Had the officials called a holding penalty or rules that Gamble caught the pass, the game may have ended with a Buckeyes victory in regulation time. Staff for the Toledo Blade wrote that Sharpe held Gamble twice on the play, and that "instead of a first down and a chance to run the clock out, OSU had to punt." Writing for The Athletic, Bill Landis also noted the uncalled penalty and stated that "it sure looked like Gamble reeled in that low throw from Krenzel." Mike War of Bleacher Report also believes that Gamble caught the ball: "Had the ref made the right call, the first down would have given Ohio State enough downs to run out the clock. ... As a result of a bad call, however, the Buckeyes were forced to play overtime against a team they had already beaten."

== Aftermath ==
The game was only the second overtime result in either the BCS or its predecessors, the Bowl Alliance and Bowl Coalition, following the 2000 Orange Bowl between the Alabama Crimson Tide and the Michigan Wolverines. With their win, Ohio State became the first team in college football history to finish a season with a 14-0 record.

The amount of future NFL talent that played in the game is considered highly exceptional. Of the 43 players who started in the game (OSU's Chris Gamble started on both offense and defense), 37 of them were eventually NFL draft picks (including 18 first-rounders, of which 12 were Hurricanes and 6 were Buckeyes). Of the 100 players who played in the game, 52 went on to be drafted and 58 went on to play in the NFL.

Ohio State and Miami wouldn't meet again until the teams scheduled a home and home series in 2010 and 2011. Each team won a game on their home field (Ohio State in 2010 and Miami in 2011). They didn't meet again in the postseason until they met in the December 2025 edition of the Cotton Bowl Classic, a quarterfinal match in the 2025-26 College Football Playoff. In that game, the Hurricanes returned the favor, knocking off the heavily favored Buckeyes (who, ironically, were the defending national champions) in what was deemed the biggest upset in the history of the College Football Playoff. The Hurricanes would then go on to make the CFP National Championship Game, but would narrowly fall to Indiana, another Big 10 team. In the National Championship Game, Jamari Sharpe, the nephew of Glenn Sharpe, started for the Hoosiers and made the game-clinching interception late to seal the game for the Hoosiers.
