= Ryan Brewer =

American football player

Profile
- Position: Running back

Career information
- High school: Troy (OH)
- College: South Carolina

Ryan Brewer is a former college football player.

== Early life ==
Brewer was Ohio's Mr. Football in 1998 playing for Troy High School. He left as the state's all-time leading rusher in a single season.

== College career ==
Brewer played for the University of South Carolina, his only major football scholarship offer. One of his most notable games was the 2001 Outback Bowl where he was named game Most Outstanding Player and tied a game record with three touchdowns. In that game, he also had over 100 yards rushing and 200 all-purpose yards. The game was also significant in that it was the last game for Ohio State coach John Cooper as he was fired by Ohio State the next day. Part of the reason for his firing was that his team was defeated by an opponent with a home state star player that he did not recruit. During the next season, his senior season, he was injured.
