= Donnie Nickey =

American football player (born 1980)

No. 23
- Position: Safety

Personal information
- Born: April 25, 1980 (age 46); Plain City, Ohio, U.S.
- Listed height: 6 ft 3 in (1.91 m)
- Listed weight: 226 lb (103 kg)

Career information
- High school: Alder (Plain City)
- College: Ohio State
- NFL draft: 2003: 5th round, 154th overall pick

Career history
- Tennessee Titans (2003–2010)

Awards and highlights
- BCS national champion (2002)

Career NFL statistics
- Total tackles: 114
- Sacks: 1
- Fumble recoveries: 2
- Stats at Pro Football Reference

Donnie Orvin Nickey (born April 25, 1980) is an American former professional football player who was a safety in the National Football League (NFL). He played college football for the Ohio State Buckeyes and was selected by the Tennessee Titans in the fifth round of the 2003 NFL draft.

== Early life ==
Nickey attended Jonathan Alder High School in Plain City, Ohio, wore number 2, and was an All-Ohio running back. He also played free safety in football. In addition to his football talent, he was selected as an All-State center fielder as part of the 1998 OHSAA State Championship baseball team.

== College career ==
Nickey was a co-captain with Mike Doss on the 2002 NCAA National Championship team.

== Professional career ==
Pre-draft measurables
Height	Weight	Arm length	Hand span	40-yard dash	10-yard split	20-yard split	20-yard shuttle	Three-cone drill	Vertical jump	Broad jump	Bench press
6 ft 2 in (1.88 m)	220 lb (100 kg)	32 in (0.81 m)	9 in (0.23 m)	4.65 s	1.59 s	2.72 s	4.16 s	7.08 s	33 1/2 in (0.85 m)	9 ft 11 in (3.02 m)	17 reps
All values from NFL Combine.

Nickey was selected by the Tennessee Titans in the fifth round (19th pick) of the 2003 NFL draft. He played his entire career with the Titans. Most of his time playing was on special teams, where he had been labeled as an 'Ace'. In 2010, while with the Titans, Nickey was ejected from a game against the San Diego Chargers after he shoved an official in the back during a retaliation with Chargers player Scott Mruczkowski. He was released by the Titans on July 25, 2011, after spending eight seasons with the team.

== Personal life ==
Nickey is married and currently lives in Dublin, Ohio. As of April 2017, he is entering his second year as varsity Head Coach of the Jackson-North Side Indians.
