= Derek Ross =

American football player (born 1980)

No. 20, 21, 25, 37
- Position: Cornerback

Personal information
- Born: January 5, 1980 (age 46); Rock Hill, South Carolina, U.S.

Career information
- High school: Northwestern (Rock Hill)
- College: Ohio State
- NFL draft: 2002: 3rd round, 75th overall pick

Career history
- Dallas Cowboys (2002–2003); Atlanta Falcons (2003); New Orleans Saints (2004)*; Minnesota Vikings (2004)*; Arizona Cardinals (2004)*; Minnesota Vikings (2004)
- * Offseason or practice squad member only

Awards and highlights
- PFWA All-Rookie Team (2002); Second-team All-Big Ten (2001)

Career NFL statistics
- Games played: 33
- Tackles: 82
- Interceptions: 6
- Stats at Pro Football Reference

Derek Ross (born January 5, 1980) is an American former professional football player who was a cornerback in the National Football League (NFL) for the Dallas Cowboys, Atlanta Falcons and Minnesota Vikings. He played college football for the Ohio State Buckeyes and was selected by the Cowboys in the third round of the 2002 NFL draft.

== Early life ==
Ross attended Northwestern High School, where he was a two-way player. As a junior, he had a total of 25 touchdowns.

As a senior, his team finished second in the state with a 12–3 record. He was the South Carolina Offensive Player of the Year and an All-state selection at quarterback, registering 1,671 passing yards, 11 passing touchdowns, 1,267 rushing yards and 19 rushing touchdowns. At cornerback he had 15 career interceptions. He was arrested four times during his high school career.

== College career ==
Ross accepted a football scholarship from Ohio State University. As a freshman, he was converted into a cornerback and appeared in every game. He blocked 3 punts on special teams, including one against Shane Lechler in the 1999 Sugar Bowl, that was returned by Kevin Griffin for a touchdown.

In 1999, he did not play football after being ruled academically ineligible. As a sophomore, he was the team's third cornerback, registering 37 tackles (4 for loss), 2 interceptions and 7 passes defensed. He earned his first start in the 2001 Outback Bowl against the University of South Carolina.

As a junior, he was suspended for spring practice after pleading guilty for driving without a license and providing false information. He started 10 games at cornerback, playing the season with a sprained AC joint and a broken bone in his shoulder. He led the Big Ten Conference with 7 interceptions (fifth in school history and third best in the nation), while also tallying 194 interception return yards (school record), 13 passes defensed, 41 tackles (3 for loss), one sack, one forced fumble and one touchdown.

He declared for the NFL draft before his senior season. He finished his college career with 217 interception return yards (fourth in school history), 91 tackles, 9 interceptions, 20 passes defensed and 3 blocked punts.

== Professional career ==
=== Dallas Cowboys ===
Ross was selected by the Dallas Cowboys in the third round (75th overall) of the 2002 NFL draft, after dropping because of character concerns. He earned his first start at left cornerback in the fourth game against the St. Louis Rams, replacing an injured Duane Hawthorne. He was considered a rising player after starting 9 games and leading all rookies with 5 interceptions, which was also the most by a Cowboys rookie since Everson Walls registered 11 interceptions in 1981. He missed the final 2 games with a hip contusion. He also had 12 passes defensed (led the team) and 67 tackles (ninth on the team).

In 2003, he started to have issues with new head coach Bill Parcells, losing his nickelback responsibilities. Parcells called him "a street player", because he relied heavily on his athletic abilities to cover wide receivers. He missed the first four games with a right knee injury and was eventually waived on December 2, after fumbling twice while returning kickoffs in a Thanksgiving loss against the Miami Dolphins, then proceeding to miss a team session the next day and a mandatory charity-related hospital visit.

=== Atlanta Falcons ===
On December 3, 2003, the Atlanta Falcons claimed him off waivers, but he only played in two regular season games. On August 17, 2004, he was released after missing more than a week of training camp with knee tendinitis.

=== New Orleans Saints ===
On August 19, 2004, the New Orleans Saints claimed him off waivers, but revoked the claim just one day later, after he missed a scheduled flight to New Orleans.

=== Minnesota Vikings (first stint) ===
On August 24, 2004, the Minnesota Vikings signed him as a free agent. He was cut on September 4.

=== Arizona Cardinals ===
On September 6, 2004, he was claimed off waivers by the Arizona Cardinals, but did not pass the physical exam and was not signed.

=== Minnesota Vikings (second stint) ===
On October 13, 2004, he signed as a free agent with the Vikings. He played in 9 regular season games, before being released on December 21.

== Personal life ==
In August 2005, Ross was arrested and charged with drug trafficking and conspiracy to traffic drugs. In August 2025, Ross was ordered to serve three years of community control and complete programming at a community-based correctional facility, after pleading guilty to felony strangulation and domestic violence.
