= 2000 All-Big Ten Conference football team =

American football team for the 2000 NCAA Division I-A football season

The 2000 All-Big Ten Conference football team consists of American football players chosen as All-Big Ten Conference players for the 2000 NCAA Division I-A football season. The conference recognizes two official All-Big Ten selectors: (1) the Big Ten conference coaches selected separate offensive and defensive units and named first- and second-team players (the "Coaches" team); and (2) a panel of sports writers and broadcasters covering the Big Ten also selected offensive and defensive units and named first- and second-team players (the "Media" team).

== Offensive selections ==
=== Quarterbacks ===
- Drew Brees, Purdue (Coaches-1; Media-1)
- Antwaan Randle El, Indiana (Coaches-2; Media-2)

=== Running backs ===
- Damien Anderson, Northwestern (Coaches-1; Media-1)
- Anthony Thomas, Michigan (Coaches-1; Media-1)
- Michael Bennett, Wisconsin (Coaches-2; Media-2)
- T. J. Duckett, Michigan State (Coaches-2; Media-2)

=== Receivers ===
- David Terrell, Michigan (Coaches-1; Media-1)
- Vinny Sutherland, Purdue (Coaches-1; Media-2)
- Ron Johnson, Minnesota (Coaches-2; Media-1)
- Chris Chambers, Wisconsin (Coaches-2)
- Kevin Kasper, Iowa (Media-2)

=== Centers ===
- Ben Hamilton, Minnesota (Coaches-1; Media-1)
- LeCharles Bentley, Ohio State (Coaches-2; Media-2)

=== Guards ===
- Steve Hutchinson, Michigan (Coaches-1; Media-1)
- Casey Rabach, Wisconsin (Coaches-1; Media-1)
- Bill Ferrario, Wisconsin (Coaches-2; Media-2)
- Ray Redziniak, Illinois (Coaches-2)
- Shaun Mason, Michigan State (Media-2)

=== Tackles ===
- Jeff Backus, Michigan (Coaches-1; Media-1)
- Matt Light, Purdue (Coaches-1; Media-1)
- Marques Sullivan, Illinois (Coaches-2; Media-2)
- Kareem McKenzie, Penn State (Coaches-2)
- Leon Brockmeier, Northwestern (Media-2)

=== Tight ends ===
- Tim Stratton, Purdue (Coaches-1; Media-1)
- Tony Stewart, Penn State (Coaches-2; Media-2)

== Defensive selections ==
=== Defensive linemen ===
- Dwayne Missouri, Northwestern (Coaches-1; Media-1)
- Karon Riley, Minnesota (Coaches-1; Media-1)
- Fred Wakefield, Illinois (Coaches-1; Media-1)
- Wendell Bryant, Wisconsin (Coaches-1; Media-2)
- Akin Ayodele, Purdue (Coaches-2; Media-2)
- Justin Kurpeikis, Penn State (Coaches-2; Media-1)
- Matt Mitrione, Purdue (Coaches-2; Media-2)
- John Schlect, Minnesota (Coaches-2)
- Brent Johnson, Ohio State (Coaches-2)

=== Linebackers ===
- Josh Thornhill, Michigan State (Coaches-1; Media-1)
- Joe Cooper, Ohio State (Coaches-1; Media-2)
- Larry Foote, Michigan (Coaches-1; Media-2)
- Nick Greisen, Wisconsin (Media-1)
- Billy Silva, Northwestern (Media-1)
- Napoleon Harris, Northwestern (Coaches-2; Media-2)
- Matt Wilhelm, Ohio State (Coaches-2)
- Sean Hoffman, Minnesota (Coaches-2)
- Justin Smith, Indiana (Coaches-2)

=== Defensive backs ===
- Nate Clements, Ohio State (Coaches-1; Media-1)
- Jamar Fletcher, Wisconsin (Coaches-1; Media-1)
- Renaldo Hill, Michigan State (Coaches-1; Media-2)
- James Boyd, Penn State (Coaches-2; Media-1)
- Mike Doss, Ohio State (Coaches-2; Media-1)
- Willie Middlebrooks, Minnesota (Coaches-1)
- Mike Echols, Wisconsin (Coaches-2; Media-2)
- Richard Newsome, Michigan State (Coaches-2)
- Harold Blackmon, Northwestern (Media-2)
- Cedric Henry, Michigan State (Media-2)

== Special teams ==
=== Kickers ===
- Dan Stultz, Ohio State (Coaches-1; Media-1)
- Dan Nystrom, Minnesota (Coaches-2)
- Tim Long, Northwestern (Media-2)

=== Punters ===
- Kevin Stemke, Wisconsin (Coaches-1; Media-1)
- Preston Gruening, Minnesota (Coaches-2; Media-2)

== Key ==
Bold = selected as a first-team player by both the coaches and media panel

Coaches = selected by Big Ten Conference coaches

Media = selected by a media panel

== See also ==
- 2000 College Football All-America Team
