= Matt Wilhelm =

American football player (born 1981)

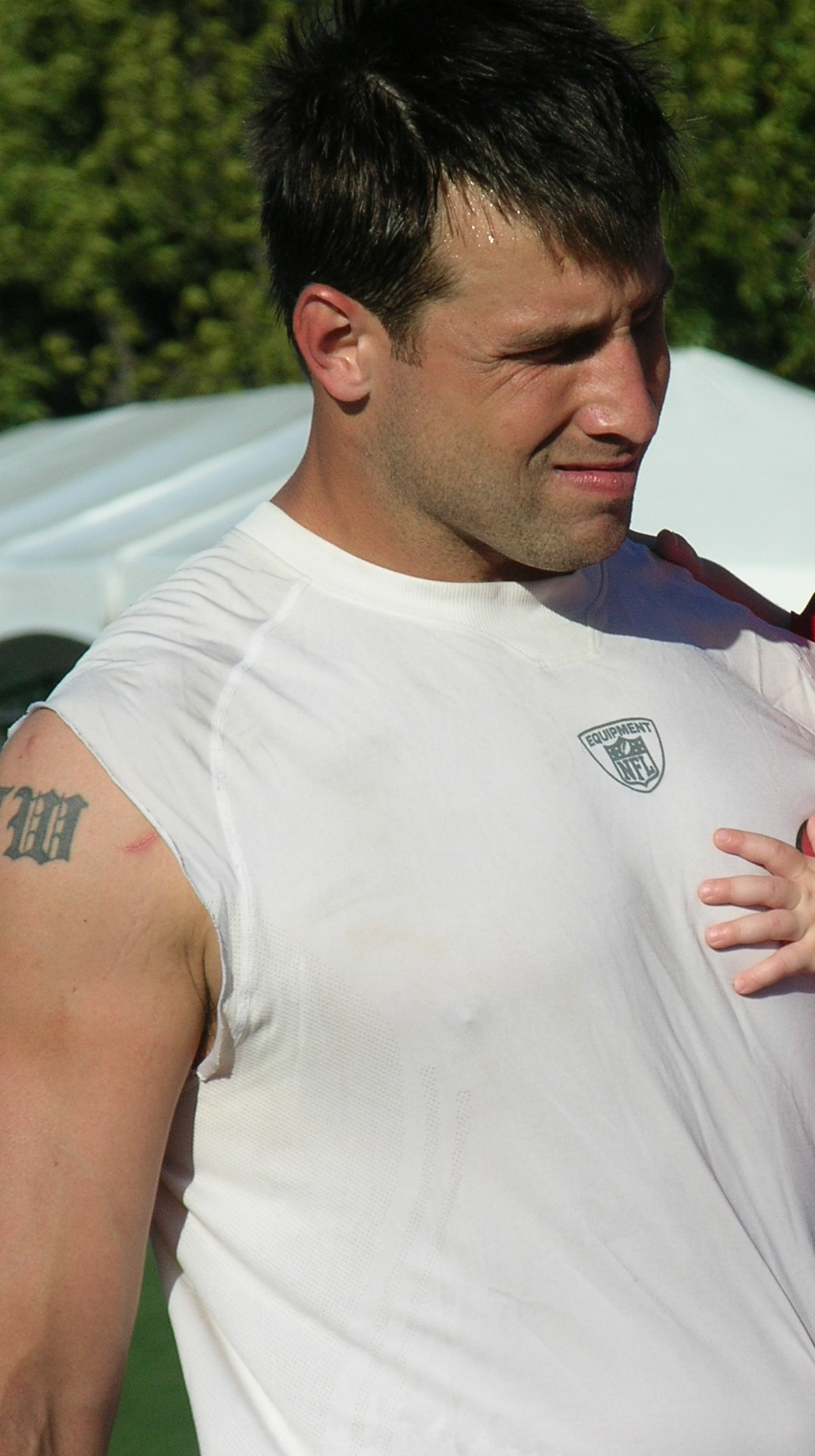
- Wilhelm at 49ers training camp in August 2010

No. 56, 57, 50
- Position: Linebacker

Personal information
- Born: February 2, 1981 (age 45); Oberlin, Ohio, U.S.
- Listed height: 6 ft 4 in (1.93 m)
- Listed weight: 245 lb (111 kg)

Career information
- High school: Elyria Catholic (Elyria, Ohio)
- College: Ohio State
- NFL draft: 2003: 4th round, 112th overall pick

Career history
- San Diego Chargers (2003–2008); Philadelphia Eagles (2009)*; San Francisco 49ers (2009); Green Bay Packers (2010)
- * Offseason or practice squad member only

Awards and highlights
- Super Bowl champion (XLV); BCS National Championship (2002); Consensus All-American (2002); First-team All-Big Ten (2002); Second-team All-Big Ten (2000)

Career NFL statistics
- Total tackles: 243
- Sacks: 2
- Forced fumbles: 1
- Fumble recoveries: 1
- Interceptions: 6
- Stats at Pro Football Reference

Matthew Wilhelm (born February 2, 1981) is an American former professional football player who is a radio/TV football analyst.

He was a linebacker in the National Football League (NFL) for eight seasons during the early 2000s. He played college football for the Ohio State Buckeyes, earning both a BCS National Championship and consensus All-American honors in 2002. He was selected by the San Diego Chargers in the fourth round of the 2003 NFL draft, also played for the San Francisco 49ers and Green Bay Packers of the NFL, and was a member of the Packers' Super Bowl XLV championship team that beat the Pittsburgh Steelers. After his retirement from football, he worked for several years as a TV and radio football analyst for various Cleveland stations.

== Early life ==
Wilhelm was born in Oberlin, Ohio, and grew up in Lorain, Ohio. He attended Elyria Catholic High School in Elyria, Ohio. He amassed 100 tackles, 26 for loss, and 11 sacks as a senior, and was named a first-team All-Ohio selection. He also played tight end and running back. In 2002, his high school retired his No. 34 jersey.

== College career ==
Wilhelm attended Ohio State University, and played for coach John Cooper and coach Jim Tressel's Ohio State Buckeyes football teams from 1999 to 2002. Wilhelm was moved to middle linebacker before his sophomore season and started every game. In his first game as a starter against Fresno State, Wilhelm intercepted a David Carr pass and ran it 25 yards for a touchdown. The following year, he earned the Randy Gradishar Award as the team's top linebacker and made all of the defensive calls. As a senior in 2002, Wilhelm was recognized as a consensus first-team All-American, and helped his team win a BCS National Championship with a team-leading 11 tackles in a 31–24 Fiesta Bowl victory over the Miami Hurricanes. Wilhelm ended the year with a career-high 121 tackles and ended his career with the 6th most career tackles for loss for Ohio State all-time.

== Professional career ==
Pre-draft measurables
Height	Weight	Arm length	Hand span	40-yard dash	Vertical jump	Broad jump	Wonderlic
6 ft 3 3/4 in (1.92 m)	245 lb (111 kg)	33 in (0.84 m)	10 1/4 in (0.26 m)	4.79 s	35 in (0.89 m)	9 ft 5 in (2.87 m)	27
Wonderlic and arm and hand spans were taken at the NFL Scouting Combine; all other measurables were taken at Pro Day.

=== San Diego Chargers ===
Wilhelm was selected by the San Diego Chargers in the fourth round of the 2003 NFL draft with the 112th overall pick. He spent the first four years of his career mostly on special teams and as a backup. In 2007, he became a full-time starter after Donnie Edwards signed with the Kansas City Chiefs. He was released by the Chargers on July 24, 2009.

=== Philadelphia Eagles ===
Wilhelm was signed by the Philadelphia Eagles on August 4, 2009, after starting middle linebacker Stewart Bradley suffered a season-ending knee injury. He was waived on September 5, 2009.

=== San Francisco 49ers ===
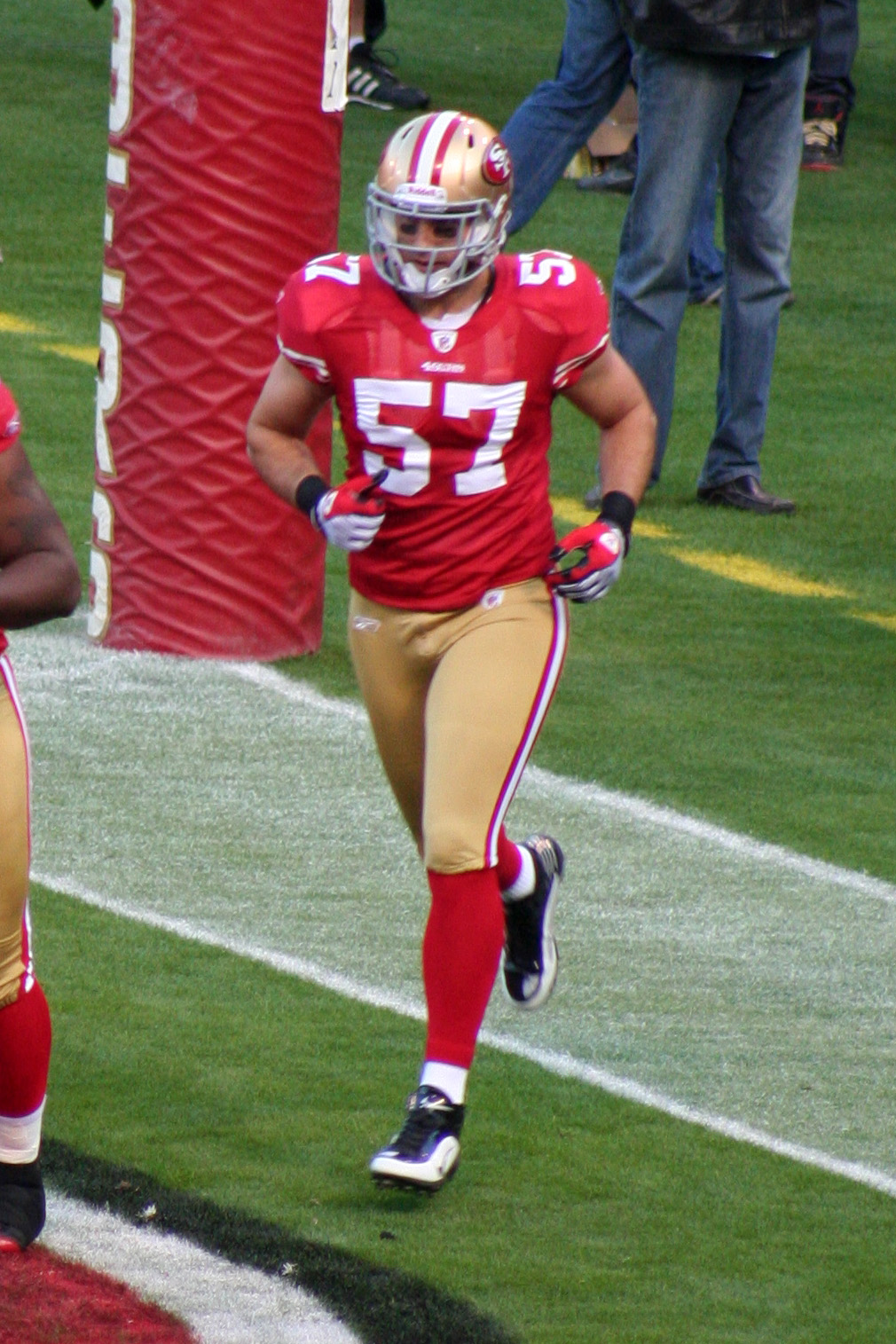
Wilhelm with the 49ers in 2009

Wilhelm was signed by the San Francisco 49ers on October 19, 2009, after reserve linebacker Jeff Ulbrich was placed on injured reserve. He was re-signed to a one-year contract on March 4, 2010. He was cut on September 3, 2010.

=== Green Bay Packers ===
Wilhelm was signed by the Green Bay Packers on October 26, 2010.

== NFL career statistics ==
Legend
**Bold**	Career high

=== Regular season ===
Year	Team	Games		Tackles					Interceptions					Fumbles			
Year	Team	GP	GS	Cmb	Solo	Ast	Sck	TFL	Int	Yds	TD	Lng	PD	FF	FR	Yds	TD
2003	SDG	2	0	2	2	0	0.0	0	0	0	0	0	0	0	0	0	0
2004	SDG	7	0	13	10	3	0.0	0	1	0	0	0	2	0	0	0	0
2005	SDG	**16**	0	31	25	6	**1.0**	1	1	10	0	**10**	1	**1**	0	0	0
2006	SDG	**16**	0	26	19	7	0.0	0	0	0	0	0	3	0	0	0	0
2007	SDG	14	**14**	**97**	**74**	**23**	**1.0**	**4**	**3**	**11**	0	7	**4**	0	**1**	0	0
2008	SDG	**16**	7	51	41	10	0.0	1	1	8	0	8	2	0	0	0	0
2009	SFO	11	1	18	12	6	0.0	1	0	0	0	0	0	0	0	0	0
2010	GNB	7	0	5	4	1	0.0	0	0	0	0	0	0	0	0	0	0
		89	22	243	187	56	2.0	7	6	29	0	10	12	1	1	0	0

=== Playoffs ===
Year	Team	Games		Tackles					Interceptions					Fumbles			
Year	Team	GP	GS	Cmb	Solo	Ast	Sck	TFL	Int	Yds	TD	Lng	PD	FF	FR	Yds	TD
2004	SDG	1	0	6	**5**	1	0.0	0	0	0	0	0	**2**	0	0	0	0
2006	SDG	1	0	1	1	0	0.0	0	0	0	0	0	0	0	0	0	0
2007	SDG	3	**2**	**8**	**5**	**3**	0.0	0	0	0	0	0	0	0	0	0	0
2008	SDG	2	0	7	4	**3**	0.0	**1**	0	0	0	0	0	0	0	0	0
2010	GNB	**4**	0	3	2	1	0.0	0	0	0	0	0	0	0	0	0	0
		11	2	25	17	8	0.0	1	0	0	0	0	2	0	0	0	0

== Retirement ==
After winning Super Bowl XLV as a member of the Packers, Wilhelm decided to retire from the NFL. In 2013, he was hired by Cleveland radio station WKNR AM 850 to be a football analyst, co-host of Cleveland Browns Daily, and serve as a co-host for the station's Ohio State Buckeyes pregame show. He also appears on Cleveland ABC affiliate WEWS-TV 5 as a Buckeyes and Browns analyst.

In 2016, Wilhelm's hometown paper, The Morning Journal, changed the name of its annual high school football Player of the Year award to The Matt Wilhelm Award in recognition of Wilhelm's lifetime of football achievements.

In 2017, Wilhelm was announced as a member of the 2017 Lorain Sports Hall of Fame class.

== Awards and honors ==
=== High school ===
- 1998 All-Ohio First-team

=== College ===
- 2002 All-Big Ten First-team
- 2002 Consensus All-American
- 2002 National Championship (as a member of the Ohio State Buckeyes)

=== NFL ===
- Super Bowl XLV winner (as a member of the Green Bay Packers)
