= Joe Cooper (linebacker) =

American gridiron football player (born 1979)

No. 95
- Position: Linebacker

Personal information
- Born: January 22, 1979 (age 47); Columbus, Ohio, U.S.
- Listed height: 6 ft 0 in (1.83 m)
- Listed weight: 239 lb (108 kg)

Career information
- High school: Columbus (OH) Independence
- College: Ohio State

Career history
- 2002: New York Jets*
- 2002: Calgary Stampeders
- 2003: St. Louis Rams*
- * Offseason or practice squad member only

Awards and highlights
- Third-team All-American (2000); First-team All-Big Ten (2000); Second-team All-Big Ten (2001)

Joe Cooper (born January 22, 1979) is an American former football linebacker. He played college football at Ohio State University, professionally with the Calgary Stampeders of the Canadian Football League (CFL). He was also a member of the New York Jets and St. Louis Rams of the National Football League (NFL).

== Early life ==
Cooper attended Independence High School in Columbus, Ohio.

== College career ==
Cooper played for the Ohio State Buckeyes from 1998 to 2001. He enrolled at Ohio State University in the fall of 1997 but was not eligible to play football that season. He earned All-Big Ten and Associated Press Third Team All-American honors in 2000 after recording 80 tackles. Cooper was also co-captain of the team in 2000 and 2001. He was voted the most inspirational player of the Buckeyes by his teammates while also being named the team's most outstanding linebacker by his coaches in 2000.

== Professional career ==
Cooper was signed by the New York Jets on April 24, 2002 after going undrafted in the 2002 NFL draft. He was released by the Jets on September 1, 2002.

Cooper played in three games, starting all three, for the Calgary Stampeders in 2002.

Cooper signed with the St. Louis Rams on January 7, 2003. He was released by the Rams on July 22, 2003.
