= Ricky Bryant =

American football player (born 1981)

No. 19
- Position: Wide receiver

Personal information
- Born: March 24, 1981 (age 45); Farmington Hills, Michigan, U.S.
- Listed height: 6 ft 0 in (1.83 m)
- Listed weight: 185 lb (84 kg)

Career information
- High school: Harrison (Farmington Hills, Michigan)
- College: Ohio State (2000–2001); Hofstra (2002–2003)
- NFL draft: 2004: undrafted

Career history
- New England Patriots (2004–2005)*; Hamburg Sea Devils (2005–2006); San Diego Chargers (2006)*
- * Offseason or practice squad member only

Awards and highlights
- Super Bowl champion (XXXIX)

Ricky Bryant (born March 24, 1981) is an American former professional football wide receiver of the National Football League (NFL). He played college football at Ohio State University and Hofstra University.

== Professional career ==
=== New England Patriots ===
On May 2, 2004, Bryant signed with the New England Patriots as an undrafted free agent. He was released on September 5, 2004. On December 7, 2004, he signed with the Patriots to join their practice squad. On February 16, 2005, he re-signed with the Patriots and was allocated to the Hamburg Sea Devils of the NFL Europe for the 2005 season.

=== San Diego Chargers ===
On May 31, 2006, he signed with the San Diego Chargers. On September 2, 2006, he was released. On November 15, 2006, he was signed to the team's practice squad.

== Pawn Stars appearance ==
Despite never playing a single game while with the Patriots, Bryant received a Super Bowl ring following their victory over the Philadelphia Eagles in Super Bowl XXXIX. He later did a deal involving his ring with a broker but never came back to retrieve it. The ring was subsequently featured on a 2011 episode of Pawn Stars, in which it was sold for $21,000.
