= Craig Krenzel =

American football player (born 1981)

No. 6, 16
- Position: Quarterback

Personal information
- Born: July 1, 1981 (age 45); Sterling Heights, Michigan, U.S.
- Listed height: 6 ft 4 in (1.93 m)
- Listed weight: 228 lb (103 kg)

Career information
- High school: Henry Ford II (Sterling Heights)
- College: Ohio State (1999–2003)
- NFL draft: 2004: 5th round, 148th overall pick

Career history
- Chicago Bears (2004); Cincinnati Bengals (2005)

Awards and highlights
- BCS national champion (2002); Draddy Trophy (2003); Second-team All-Big Ten (2002)

Career NFL statistics
- Passing attempts: 127
- Passing completions: 59
- Completion percentage: 46.5%
- TD–INT: 3–6
- Passing yards: 718
- Passer rating: 52.5
- Stats at Pro Football Reference

Craig Krenzel (born July 1, 1981) is an American former professional football player who was a quarterback in the National Football League (NFL). He played college football for the Ohio State Buckeyes. As the starting quarterback, he led their 2002 team to a national championship. He played professionally in the NFL for one season with the Chicago Bears in 2004.

== Early life ==
Krenzel attended Henry Ford II High School (Sterling Heights, Mich.), and was an excellent student and a letterman in football (3 yrs), basketball (2 yrs), and baseball (1 yr). In football, as a senior, Krenzel completed 60 percent of his passes and threw for 1,760 yards and 25 touchdowns, and won USA Today honorable mention All-America accolades that year.

== College career ==
Krenzel played in college for The Ohio State Buckeyes. After quarterback Steve Bellisari was suspended from play due to an alcohol-related police charge late in the 2001 season, Krenzel earned the starting position against Michigan and led the Buckeyes to their first win in Ann Arbor since 1987. His most successful year was 2002 when he led Ohio State to the national championship. Krenzel was 24–2 as a starter (while appearing in 27 games, appearing in relief of Scott McMullen in a loss to Illinois in 2001).

Krenzel graduated from The Ohio State University with a degree in molecular genetics and a GPA of 3.75. He did research as part of a selective oncology laboratory at the Ohio State University Medical Center. Krenzel was named a First-team Academic All-American and Academic All-American of the Year, and received three Academic All-Big Ten awards, the Today's Top VIII Award, a National Football Foundation Hall of Fame post-graduate scholarship, Sporting News' Socrates Award, and the Draddy Trophy.

Krenzel's brother Brian was also talented in both academics and athletics, playing for the Duke Blue Devils football team before graduating from the University of Louisville School of Medicine.

== Professional career ==
Pre-draft measurables
Height	Weight	Arm length	Hand span	40-yard dash	10-yard split	20-yard split	20-yard shuttle	Three-cone drill	Vertical jump	Broad jump	Wonderlic
6 ft 3 1/2 in (1.92 m)	228 lb (103 kg)	32 3/4 in (0.83 m)	9 1/8 in (0.23 m)	4.85 s	1.70 s	2.83 s	4.08 s	7.22 s	28.0 in (0.71 m)	9 ft 4 in (2.84 m)	38
All values from NFL Combine

Krenzel was drafted in the fifth round of the 2004 NFL draft (148th overall) by the Chicago Bears, for whom he played the 2004 season. Despite poor passing statistics, Krenzel won his first three starts at quarterback with the Bears, including a win over the San Francisco 49ers, which was at the time starting Ken Dorsey at quarterback, the same quarterback that started for the Miami Hurricanes during the 2003 National Championship game. However, he lost his final two starts with the Bears and injured his ankle, ending his season. In 2005, he was cut by the Bears in the offseason and he signed with the Cincinnati Bengals. He was the third-string quarterback on the team behind Carson Palmer and Jon Kitna. He was released by the Bengals in May 2006 due to an elbow injury that he sustained that eventually required Tommy John surgery.

== Personal life ==
Krenzel now works as a commentator on 97.1 The Fan in Columbus, Ohio. Craig is known for his bit known as the "Mike Tomczak Story."

He is also a spokesman for JD Equipment and has acted in several commercial spots.

Krenzel now is a partner of the Arthur Krenzel Lett Insurance Group in Columbus, Ohio and Winfield, West Virginia. Craig Lett, his business partner, is the son of the Minor League pitcher Jim Lett of the Cincinnati Reds.

Krenzel's son Brayden is a pitcher for the University of Tennessee Baseball Team.
