= 2001 Outback Bowl =

- 15th Outback Bowl
Ohio State Buckeyes	South Carolina Gamecocks
(8–3)	(7–4)
Big Ten	SEC
7	24
Head coach: John Cooper	Head coach: Lou Holtz
AP / Coaches / BCS; 19 / 18 / 18
	1	2	3	4	Total
Ohio State	0	0	7	0	7
South Carolina	0	3	7	14	24
- Date: January 1, 2001
- Season: 2000
- Stadium: Raymond James Stadium
- Location: Tampa, Florida
- MVP: Ryan Brewer (South Carolina RB)
- Referee: Bill Athan (WAC)

United States TV coverage
- Network: ESPN
- Announcers: Ron Franklin, Mike Gottfried, Adrian Karsten

The 2001 Outback Bowl featured the South Carolina Gamecocks, and the Ohio State Buckeyes. It was the 15th edition of the Outback Bowl.

== Summary ==
After a scoreless first quarter, South Carolina kicker Jason Corse put the Gamecocks on the board with a 23-yard field goal, giving USC an early 3–0 lead. That score would hold until halftime, with both teams playing terrific defense.

In the third quarter, South Carolina's Ryan Brewer rushed seven yards for a touchdown, increasing the lead to 10–0. South Carolina's defense held again and got the ball back, but fumbled on the ensuing drive, with Ohio State's Mike Gurr recovering the fumble in the end zone for a touchdown, pulling Ohio State to within three points, 10–7.

Early in the fourth quarter, quarterback Phil Petty found Ryan Brewer for a 28-yard touchdown pass, increasing South Carolina's lead to 17–7. With seven minutes left in the game, Brewer again scored from two yards out, making the final score 24–7.

Ohio State's head coach, John Cooper, was fired following the game.
