= Jamar Martin =

American football player (born 1980)

No. 34, 32, 41
- Position: Fullback

Personal information
- Born: April 12, 1980 (age 46); Canton, Ohio, U.S.
- Listed height: 5 ft 11 in (1.80 m)
- Listed weight: 244 lb (111 kg)

Career information
- High school: McKinley (Canton)
- College: Ohio State
- NFL draft: 2002: 4th round, 129th overall pick

Career history
- Dallas Cowboys (2002–2003); Miami Dolphins (2004); New Orleans Saints (2006)*; New York Jets (2006); New Orleans VooDoo (2007)*; New York Dragons (2008)*
- * Offseason or practice squad member only

Career NFL statistics
- Games played: 25
- Rushing attempts: 4
- Rushing yards: 7
- Receptions: 6
- Receiving yards: 24
- Stats at Pro Football Reference

Jamar Martin (born April 12, 1980) is an American former professional football player who was a fullback in the National Football League (NFL) for the Dallas Cowboys, Miami Dolphins, and New York Jets. He played college football for the Ohio State Buckeyes.

== Early life ==
Martin attended McKinley High School, where he was a two-way player. As a senior, he started at fullback and outside linebacker, tallying 59 carries for 368 yards (6.2-yard avg), 5 touchdowns, 59 tackles and 5 sacks. He also helped his team achieve a 14-0 record and the Ohio Big School State Championship.

== College career ==
Martin accepted a football scholarship from Ohio State University, where he became a dominant blocker at fullback. He started 6 games as a sophomore, blocking for Michael Wiley. Against the University of Michigan, he had a career-high 35 rushing yards, that included a 21-yard run and a one-yard touchdown.

As a junior, he was the regular starter at fullback, blocking for Derek Combs and helping the team post 2,199 rushing yards. As a senior, he was a team co-captain, blocking for Jonathan Wells, while registering 22 carries for 86 yards, 13 receptions for 120 yards and 2 touchdowns.

He finished his career with 61 carries for 226 yards (4.0 avg) and 4 rushing touchdowns in 47 games (29 starts). He also had 22 receptions for 211 yards (9.6 avg) and 2 receiving touchdowns.

== Professional career ==
=== Dallas Cowboys ===
Martin was selected by the Dallas Cowboys in the fourth round (129th overall) of the 2002 NFL draft, to compete at fullback against the incumbent Robert Thomas. As a rookie, he suffered a right ACL tear during the first contact drill in training camp on July 29 and was placed on the injured reserve list on August 27.

In 2003, he played in 14 games, mainly on the special teams units and as a backup to Richie Anderson. He had his first career start in the thirteenth game against the Philadelphia Eagles, helping the team rush for 150 yards. The next game against the Washington Redskins, he returned to a reserve role but still contributed to Troy Hambrick rushing for 189 yards, which at the time was the third best single-game performance in franchise history.

It has been speculated that he was never the same player after his injury and was eventually waived on September 5, 2004, when the team opted to keep Darian Barnes in his place.

=== Miami Dolphins ===
On September 6, 2004, the Miami Dolphins claimed him off waivers. He was released on September 3, 2005.

=== New Orleans Saints ===
After being out of football for a season, he signed as a free agent with the New Orleans Saints on July 27, 2006. He was cut on August 10.

=== New York Jets ===
On August 13, 2006, the New York Jets claimed him off the waiver wire. He was released on September 20.

=== New Orleans VooDoo ===
Martin signed with the New Orleans VooDoo of the Arena Football League on October 19, 2006. He was placed on refuse to report on February 5, 2007.

=== New York Dragons ===
On August 30, 2007, Martin and Henry Taylor were traded to the New York Dragons for Mike Horacek and future considerations. He was placed on refuse to report on February 4, 2008.

== Coaching career ==
After retiring from playing, Martin was named the running backs coach at Westland High School in Galloway, Ohio.
