= Scott McMullen =

American football player (born 1980)

Profile
- Position: Quarterback

Personal information
- Born: November 18, 1980 (age 45); Granville, Ohio, U.S.
- Listed height: 6 ft 3 in (1.91 m)
- Listed weight: 215 lb (98 kg)

Career information
- High school: Granville
- College: Ohio State (1999–2003)
- NFL draft: 2004: undrafted

Career history
- Philadelphia Eagles (2004)*; Columbus Destroyers (2005)
- * Offseason or practice squad member only

Awards and highlights
- BCS national champion (2002)

Career AFL statistics
- Comp. / Att.: 33 / 64
- Passing yards: 332
- TD–INT: 4–2
- Passer rating: 69.27
- Rushing TDs: 1
- Stats at ArenaFan.com

Scott Alan McMullen (born November 18, 1980) is an American former football quarterback. He played college football for the Ohio State Buckeyes and professionally for the Columbus Destroyers of the Arena Football League (AFL). He was also a member of the Philadelphia Eagles of the National Football League (NFL).

== Early life ==
Scott Alan McMullen was born on November 18, 1980, in Granville, Ohio. He played high school football at Granville High School. He threw for 2,081 yards and 20 touchdowns his sophomore year. As a junior, McMullen passed for 1,442 yards and 14 touchdowns while missing time due to a back injury. He completed 118 of 191 passes (62%) for 2,577 yards, 24 touchdowns, and five interceptions his senior year in 1998, earning Associated Press first-team Division IV all-Ohio honors.

== College career ==
McMullen played college football for the Ohio State Buckeyes of Ohio State University. He was redshirted in 1999 and was a four-year letterman from 2000 to 2003. He was third on the depth chart at quarterback for most of the 2000 season, recording five completions on 11 passing attempts (45.5%) for 88 yards and one touchdown in three games played. MCMullen appeared in five games in 2001, including one start in relief of the injured Steve Bellisari. McMullen finished the 2001 season with six completions on 21 attempts (28.6%) for 85 yards, one touchdown, and one interception. He played in five games during Ohio State's 2002 national championship season as the backup to Craig Krenzel, completing 25 of 31 passes (80.6%) for 315 yards and two touchdowns while also rushing for one touchdown. McMullen played in seven games as a senior in 2003, backing up Krenzel again. McMullen completed 51 of 78 passes (65.4%) for 615 yards, five touchdowns, and three interceptions during the 2003 season. He majored in Turf and Grass Science from 2001 to 2002 and in Family Resource Management in 2003.

== Professional career ==
McMullen was signed by the Philadelphia Eagles on April 30, 2004, after going undrafted in the 2004 NFL draft. He was released by the team on June 1, 2004.

On October 22, 2004, McMullen signed with the Columbus Destroyers of the Arena Football League (AFL) for the 2005 AFL season. He was waived on January 24, 2005, and signed to the team's practice squad on January 26. He was promoted to the active roster on April 1, 2005. McMullen played in four games for the Destroyers during the 2004 season, completing 33 of 64 passes (51.6%) for 332 yards, four touchdowns, and two interceptions while also scoring one rushing touchdown.
