= Steve Bellisari =

American football player (born 1980)

No. 8
- Position: Quarterback

Personal information
- Born: April 21, 1980 (age 46); Boca Raton, Florida, U.S.
- Listed height: 6 ft 3 in (1.91 m)
- Listed weight: 225 lb (102 kg)

Career information
- High school: Boca Raton (FL)
- College: Ohio State
- NFL draft: 2002: 6th round, 205th overall pick

Career history
- St. Louis Rams (2002); Dayton Warbirds (2005); Manchester Wolves (2005); Kansas City Brigade (2006)*; New Orleans VooDoo (2007–2008)
- * Offseason or practice squad member only

Career AFL statistics
- Comp. / Att.: 215 / 350
- Passing yards: 2,547
- TD–INT: 52–15
- QB rating: 102.88
- Rushing TD: 8
- Stats at ArenaFan.com

Steve Bellisari (born April 21, 1980) is an American former professional football quarterback. He is best known for his time playing football at Ohio State University from 1998 to 2001.

== College career ==
Bellisari, a special teams player and a defensive back his first year, replaced Joe Germaine as the Ohio State starting quarterback in 1999. He had a stellar prep career at Boca Raton High School

In contrast to the accurate Germaine, Bellisari was a more athletic, yet at times erratic thrower. Notably, however, Bellisari's interception rate was 3.82%, lower than more highly recognized Ohio State quarterbacks Art Schlichter, Mike Tomczak, Greg Frey, and Bobby Hoying. Bellisari experienced an increasingly controversial tenure as Ohio State's starting quarterback, culminating in a one-game suspension towards the end of his senior season following an arrest for drunk driving. He was re-instated before the Michigan game, but did not start. Bellisari traveled with the team to the 2002 Outback Bowl against South Carolina, where he finished his career as a substitute, leading Ohio State back from a large deficit to tie the game before giving up an interception that allowed South Carolina to kick a winning field goal.

== Professional career ==
Pre-draft measurables
Height	Weight
6 ft 1 1/8 in (1.86 m)	222 lb (101 kg)
Values from Pro Day

Bellisari was drafted 205th overall by the St. Louis Rams in the sixth round of the 2002 NFL draft and converted to safety. After being out of football, in 2005, Bellisari played for the Dayton Warbirds of the NIFL, an indoor football league, and later moved up to the Manchester Wolves in the second half of the 2005 af2 season, leading them into the playoffs with four straight victories to finish out the year. Rarely turning the ball over in his stay with the Wolves, Bellisari was driving the Wolves down the field late in the fourth quarter when he threw his last pass as a Wolf, a game-sealing interception to the Florida Firecats. The final score was Florida 40, Manchester 39.

== Career statistics ==
=== AFL ===
Year	Team	Passing							Rushing		
Year	Team	Cmp	Att	Pct	Yds	TD	Int	Rtg	Att	Yds	TD
2007	New Orleans	190	304	62.5	2,262	47	12	107.37	27	50	7
2008	New Orleans	25	46	54.3	285	5	3	73.19	2	5	1
Career		215	350	61.4	2,547	52	15	102.88	29	55	8

=== College ===
Year	Team	Passing								Rushing			
Year	Team	Cmp	Att	Pct	Yds	Y/A	TD	Int	Rtg	Att	Yds	Avg	TD
1998	Ohio State	3	5	60.0	24	4.8	0	0	100.3	0	0	0.0	0
1999	Ohio State	101	224	45.1	1,616	7.2	12	9	115.3	116	332	2.9	2
2000	Ohio State	163	310	52.6	2,319	7.5	13	13	120.9	107	179	1.7	1
2001	Ohio State	98	185	53.0	1,599	8.6	8	6	133.4	72	97	1.3	2
Career		365	724	50.4	5,558	7.7	33	28	122.2	295	608	2.1	5

== See also ==
- List of Arena Football League and National Football League players
