= LeCharles Bentley =

American football player and administrator (born 1979)

No. 65
- Positions: Guard, center

Personal information
- Born: November 7, 1979 (age 47); Cleveland, Ohio, U.S.
- Listed height: 6 ft 2 in (1.88 m)
- Listed weight: 309 lb (140 kg)

Career information
- High school: Saint Ignatius (Cleveland)
- College: Ohio State (1998–2001)
- NFL draft: 2002: 2nd round, 44th overall pick

Career history
- New Orleans Saints (2002–2005); Cleveland Browns (2006–2007)

Awards and highlights
- 2× Pro Bowl (2003, 2005); PFWA All-Rookie Team (2002); Rimington Trophy (2001); Consensus All-American (2001); Big Ten Offensive Lineman of the Year (2001); First-team All-Big Ten (2001); Second-team All-Big Ten (2000)

Career NFL statistics
- Games played: 57
- Games started: 57
- Stats at Pro Football Reference

LeCharles Vernon Bentley (born November 7, 1979) is an American former professional football player who was a guard and center in the National Football League (NFL) for four seasons. He played college football for the Ohio State Buckeyes, earned consensus All-American honors, and won the Rimington Trophy. He was selected by the New Orleans Saints in the second round of the 2002 NFL draft. Bentley was a two-time Pro Bowl selection with the Saints.

He was hired by the NFL as their senior advisor of player performance and development in April 2021.

== Early life ==
Bentley was born in Cleveland, Ohio. He played high school football at St. Ignatius High School in Cleveland. He was a two-year starter and was a three-year letterman, earning All-Ohio honors as a senior in 1997.

== College career ==
Bentley attended Ohio State University, where he was a four-year letterman for the Ohio State Buckeyes football team from 1998 to 2001, first for head coach John Cooper, then for Jim Tressel during his senior year. As a senior in 2001, he won the Rimington Trophy as college football's best center, received first-team All-Big Ten Conference honors, and was recognized as a consensus first-team All-American. He was a human development and family science major.

== Professional career ==
Pre-draft measurables
Height	Weight	Arm length	Hand span	40-yard dash	10-yard split	20-yard split	20-yard shuttle	Three-cone drill	Vertical jump	Broad jump
6 ft 2 3/8 in (1.89 m)	299 lb (136 kg)	31 3/4 in (0.81 m)	9 3/4 in (0.25 m)	5.13 s	1.73 s	2.93 s	4.54 s	7.85 s	25.5 in (0.65 m)	8 ft 7 in (2.62 m)
All values from NFL Combine

=== New Orleans Saints ===
Bentley was selected in the second round (44th overall) in the 2002 NFL draft by the New Orleans Saints and was signed to a four-year deal worth $2.95 million. He excelled at the guard position and started in 14 games. He was named Sports Illustrated's Offensive Rookie of the Year in 2002 and Pro Football Weekly All-Rookie Team. He made his NFL debut at the Tampa Bay Buccaneers on September 8.

Bentley started in 13 games and earned a spot in the 2003 Pro Bowl.

In the 2004 season he moved back to his original center position and started in all 16 games, he went on to be voted as an alternate to the 2004 Pro Bowl at that position.

Bentley started 14 games at center in 2005 and was voted to the Pro Bowl again. He left the Saints saying he would rather sit out the season than play with them again.

=== Cleveland Browns ===
After backing out of an unofficial agreement with the Philadelphia Eagles, Bentley signed with the Cleveland Browns in 2006, and was regarded by ESPN as the top-rated free agent. However, Bentley tore his patellar tendon on the first play of the team's first 11-on-11 training camp session on July 27, and missed the entire 2006 season. He underwent four total operations, including two to clean out a staph infection that ate away at the tendon, in addition to a virus that became severe enough that doctors considered amputating his leg.

ESPN reported on July 23, 2007, that Bentley had been cleared to play and would be reporting to training camp. Bentley said that his knee was "70 percent" and thought it would improve upon the start of the 2007 campaign, but he would again miss the entire season. In December, the Browns reduced Bentley's $36-million contract from six years to three and his salary to the NFL minimum $605,000, with incentives to reach $4 million.

On June 10, 2008, nearly two years after his injury, the Cleveland Plain Dealer reported that Bentley had passed his team physical and was cleared to return to the practice field, but the following day, the Browns granted his request to be released.

== Post-playing career ==
Upon his release, teams such as Buffalo, Cincinnati, Miami, Oakland, Pittsburgh, St. Louis, San Francisco and Seattle expressed varying degrees of interest in Bentley. However, Bentley did not return to play professional football.

After spending the 2008 season out of football, Bentley announced in January 2009 that he was no longer attempting to return to the NFL, and would start a career in Cleveland media. He co-hosted a nightly program on WKNR AM 850 from 2009 to 2011, and has also served as a camp coach.

On July 22, 2010, ESPN.com reported that Bentley was suing the Browns for having him rehab in training facilities where other members of the Cleveland Browns had gotten staphylococcal infections. The staph infection did not allow his left patella tendon to heal. In July 2011, the Ohio Court of Appeals allowed the suit to go forward over the Browns' objection. In February 2012, the Browns asked the United States Supreme Court to review that call, but in April 2012, the Court declined to hear the case. Bentley and the Browns reached a confidential settlement in 2012.

In April 2021, the NFL hired Bentley as their senior advisor of player performance and development.

On August 5, 2025, the New Orleans Saints hired Bentley to serve as a personnel and performance consultant.

== Personal life ==
On December 20, 2006, Bentley presented his alma mater, St. Ignatius High School, with a check for $100,000. The money was to be used for a scholarship fund named in honor of his mother, Verneda. In May 2007, it was revealed that Bentley's mother has been accused of using money intended for the education of poor children to buy herself furniture. Federal agents investigated Verneda Bentley for a fire that caused more than $1 million in damage at the nonprofit organization she runs.

Bentley lives in Cleveland, and owns the L. Bentley O-Line Academy in Avon, Ohio. It is a facility that takes a comprehensive approach to teaching offensive line skills.
