= Courtland Bullard =

American football player (born 1978)

No. 15, 51
- Position: Linebacker

Personal information
- Born: September 2, 1978 (age 48)
- Listed height: 6 ft 3 in (1.91 m)
- Listed weight: 240 lb (109 kg)

Career information
- High school: Miami Southridge (Miami, Florida)
- College: Ohio State
- NFL draft: 2002: 5th round, 167th overall pick

Career history
- St. Louis Rams (2002–2003); Jacksonville Jaguars (2004)*
- * Offseason or practice squad member only

Career NFL statistics
- Games played: 20
- Games started: 1
- Stats at Pro Football Reference

Courtland B. Bullard (born September 2, 1978) is an American former professional football player who was a linebacker in the National Football League (NFL). He was selected by the St. Louis Rams in the fifth round of the 2002 NFL draft. He played college football for the Ohio State Buckeyes.

== Professional career ==
=== Pre-draft ===
Pre-draft measurables
Height	Weight	40-yard dash	10-yard split	20-yard split	20-yard shuttle	Three-cone drill	Vertical jump	Broad jump	Bench press	Wonderlic
6 ft 3 in (1.91 m)	234 lb (106 kg)	4.69 s	1.63 s	2.72 s	4.28 s	6.99 s	36 1/2 in (0.93 m)	10 ft 3 in (3.12 m)	x reps	14
All from NFL Combine.
