= Tyson Walter =

American football player (born 1978)

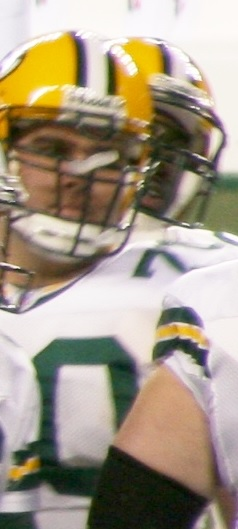
- Walter with the Green Bay Packers in 2006

No. 71, 72, 70
- Position: Center

Personal information
- Born: March 17, 1978 (age 48); Bainbridge, Ohio, U.S.
- Listed height: 6 ft 4 in (1.93 m)
- Listed weight: 303 lb (137 kg)

Career information
- High school: Kenston (OH)
- College: Ohio State
- NFL draft: 2002: 6th round, 179th overall pick

Career history
- Dallas Cowboys (2002–2004); Houston Texans (2005); Washington Redskins (2006); Green Bay Packers (2006–2007)

Awards and highlights
- First-team All-Big Ten (2001)

Career NFL statistics
- Games played: 47
- Games started: 9
- Stats at Pro Football Reference

Tyson Barrett Walter (born March 17, 1978) is an American former professional football player who was a center n the National Football League (NFL) for the Dallas Cowboys, Washington Redskins, and Green Bay Packers. He played college football for the Ohio State Buckeyes. He was also a member of the Houston Texans but did not play in any games.

== Early life ==
Walter attended Kenston High School, where he was a two-way player at offensive and defensive tackle. As a senior, he helped his team finish second in the state playoffs, while earning All-Ohio honors.

He accepted a football scholarship from Ohio State University. As a true freshman, he appeared in the first two games as a backup offensive tackle, before being lost with a shoulder sprain and being granted a medical redshirt.

Walter was named the starter at left tackle as a redshirt freshman, replacing the graduated All-American Orlando Pace.

In 1999, he was able to start in all games, despite missing most of the summer after undergoing back surgery. He missed the 2000 season due to a hip infection.

After being granted an additional year of eligibility, he returned as a sixth-year senior to achieve a school record 49 starts (all at left tackle) and earn All-Big Ten honors.

== Professional career ==
=== Dallas Cowboys ===
Walter was selected by the Dallas Cowboys in the sixth round (179th overall) of the 2002 NFL draft. He was one of three Ohio State players selected by the Cowboys that year.

As a rookie, he made the team even though he was sidelined for most of training camp with a high left ankle sprain. He was declared inactive during the first 4 contests and started 8 games at center after Andre Gurode was moved to right guard.

The next year, Al Johnson was selected to replace him in the starting lineup and improve the center position. Even though Johnson was lost for the season with a knee injury, Matt Lehr was named the starter over Walter.

In 2004, he regained the starter position, but suffered a sprained left knee in the second quarter of the season opener against the Minnesota Vikings, opening the door for Johnson to start the rest of the season at center.

Walter remained a versatile backup and was used in four different positions along the offensive line. On September 3, 2005, he was waived to keep second-year player Ben Noll on the roster.

=== Houston Texans ===
On November 18, 2005, he signed with the Houston Texans. Although he was a part of the regular roster, he was declared inactive for the last 7 games of the season. He wasn't re-signed after the season.

=== Washington Redskins ===
On March 23, 2006, the Washington Redskins signed him as a free agent to be the backup center. He was released on October 24.

=== Green Bay Packers ===
On November 25, 2006, he signed as a free agent with the Green Bay Packers. On September 1, 2007, he was placed on the injured reserve list and wasn't re-signed after the season.
