= Darnell Sanders =

American football player (born 1979)

No. 89, 88
- Position: Tight end

Personal information
- Born: March 16, 1979 (age 47); Cleveland, Ohio, U.S.
- Listed height: 6 ft 6 in (1.98 m)
- Listed weight: 270 lb (122 kg)

Career information
- High school: Warrensville Heights (Warrensville Heights, Ohio)
- College: Ohio State
- NFL draft: 2002: 4th round, 122nd overall pick

Career history
- Cleveland Browns (2002–2003); Atlanta Falcons (2004); Chicago Bears (2005)*; Cincinnati Bengals (2006)*; Detroit Lions (2007)*
- * Offseason or practice squad member only

Career NFL statistics
- Games played: 28
- Games started: 15
- Receptions: 18
- Receiving yards: 118
- Touchdowns: 2
- Stats at Pro Football Reference

Darnell L. Sanders (born March 16, 1979) is an American former professional football player who was a tight end in the National Football League (NFL). He played college football for the Ohio State Buckeyes, finishing with 42 catches for 474 yards and nine touchdowns in 36 games (23 starts). He was selected 122nd overall by the Cleveland Browns in the fourth round of the 2002 NFL draft. He also played for the Atlanta Falcons.
