= Mike Doss =

American football player (born 1981)

No. 20, 21, 44
- Position: Safety

Personal information
- Born: March 24, 1981 (age 45); Canton, Ohio, U.S.
- Listed height: 5 ft 10 in (1.78 m)
- Listed weight: 207 lb (94 kg)

Career information
- High school: Canton McKinley
- College: Ohio State (1999–2002)
- NFL draft: 2003: 2nd round, 58th overall pick

Career history
- Indianapolis Colts (2003–2006); Minnesota Vikings (2007); Cincinnati Bengals (2008)

Awards and highlights
- Super Bowl champion (XLI); BCS national champion (2002); Jack Tatum Trophy (2002); Unanimous All-American (2002); 2× First-team All-American (2000, 2001); Big Ten Co-Defensive Player of the Year (2002); 3× First-team All-Big Ten (2000, 2001, 2002)

Career NFL statistics
- Total tackles: 276
- Sacks: 1
- Forced fumbles: 6
- Pass deflections: 18
- Interceptions: 7
- Stats at Pro Football Reference
- College Football Hall of Fame

Michael Allen Doss (born March 24, 1981) is an American former professional football player who was a safety in the National Football League (NFL) for six seasons. He played college football for the Ohio State Buckeyes, earning consensus All-American honors thrice and winning the 2002 national championship. He was selected in the second round of the 2003 NFL draft by the Indianapolis Colts, with whom he played four seasons with, including during the team's 2006 Super Bowl season. Doss then spent one season with the Minnesota Vikings and Cincinnati Bengals each before retiring.

== Early life ==
Doss was born in Canton, Ohio. He attended Canton McKinley High School, and played high school football for the McKinley Bulldogs. He led the Bulldogs to back-to-back state football championships, as well as a USA Today national championship, as a running back, linebacker, and safety. As a senior, he had 1,454 yards rushing, 22 touchdowns, 111 tackles, and three interceptions and won all-state honors and an All-America honorable mention by USA Today.

== College career ==
Doss attended Ohio State University, where he played for the Buckeyes from 1999 to 2002. He started 40 out of 50 career games and was a three-time first-team All-Big Ten selection and a three-time first-team All-America choice by the Sporting News. He had 331 career tackles, eight interceptions, eight fumbles recovered, and six quarterback sacks. With Doss starting all 14 games as a senior, Doss intercepted a Ken Dorsey pass to give Ohio State the lead in the BCS national championship game. As a senior, he was the Big Ten Defensive Player of the Year, and a unanimous first-team All-American.

Doss was inducted into the Ohio State University Football Hall of Fame in 2011.

== Professional career ==
Pre-draft measurables
Height	Weight	Arm length	Hand span
5 ft 10 1/8 in (1.78 m)	207 lb (94 kg)	31 1/8 in (0.79 m)	10 in (0.25 m)
All values from NFL Combine

=== Indianapolis Colts ===
In 2003, the Indianapolis Colts selected Doss in the second round of the 2003 NFL draft with the 58th overall pick. In that season, he started 15 games at strong safety, amassing 101 tackles and three interceptions. Doss was released by the Colts after the 2006 season.

=== Minnesota Vikings ===
On April 4, 2007, Doss was signed to a one-year contract by the Minnesota Vikings. He played in eight games.

=== Cincinnati Bengals ===
Doss was then signed by the Cincinnati Bengals on December 9, 2008, after the team released defensive end Josh Mallard. He was released by the team on April 27, 2009.

=== NFL statistics ===
Year	Team	GP	COMB	TOTAL	AST	SACK	FF	FR	FR YDS	INT	IR YDS	AVG IR	LNG	TD	PD
2003	IND	15	102	73	29	0.0	3	0	0	1	15	15	15	0	4
2004	IND	10	46	39	7	1.0	3	0	0	2	32	16	32	0	2
2005	IND	15	77	57	20	0.0	0	0	0	2	8	4	8	0	5
2006	IND	6	29	24	5	0.0	0	0	0	2	47	24	31	0	5
2007	MIN	8	6	5	1	0.0	0	0	0	0	0	0	0	0	0
2008	CIN	3	1	1	0	0.0	0	0	0	0	0	0	0	0	1
Career		57	261	199	62	1.0	6	0	0	7	102	15	32	0	17

== Personal ==
As of 2023, Doss works for The Robert Weiler Company as sales and development specialist in Columbus, Ohio . He is married with three children.
