= Jonathan Wells (American football) =

American football player (born 1979)

No. 32
- Position: Running back

Personal information
- Born: July 21, 1979 (age 47); River Ridge, Louisiana, U.S.
- Listed height: 6 ft 1 in (1.85 m)
- Listed weight: 252 lb (114 kg)

Career information
- High school: John Curtis Christian (River Ridge)
- College: Ohio State
- NFL draft: 2002: 4th round, 99th overall pick

Career history
- Houston Texans (2002–2005); Indianapolis Colts (2006)*
- * Offseason or practice squad member only

Awards and highlights
- Second-team All-Big Ten (2001)

Career NFL statistics
- Rushing attempts: 374
- Rushing yards: 1,167
- Rushing touchdowns: 10
- Receptions: 44
- Receiving yards: 323
- Receiving touchdowns: 2
- Stats at Pro Football Reference

Jonathan Wells (born July 21, 1979) is an American former professional football player who was a running back for the Houston Texans of the National Football League (NFL). He played college football for the Ohio State Buckeyes and was selected by the Texans in the fourth round of the 2002 NFL draft.

== Early life ==
Wells played high school football at John Curtis Christian High School in his native River Ridge, Louisiana. He assisted the team in capturing three consecutive 4A state championships.

== College career ==
Wells played college football with the Ohio State Buckeyes. Despite starting only 15 of 45 career games, he carried 479 times for 2,418 yards and 27 touchdowns, ranking 13th on the school's all-time rushing yards list. He was selected in the 2002 NFL draft by the Houston Texans.

He is most remembered by Buckeye fans for his 129 yards rushing 3 touchdown performance against Michigan, to help the Buckeyes beat the 11th-ranked Wolverines 26–20 in Jim Tressel's first year as head coach. His effort helped snap an Ohio State six- game losing streak at Michigan Stadium, getting a win there for the first time since 1987. He was named Ohio State's 2001 season MVP. Wells was also named to the 2nd Team All Big Ten Coaches and Media Teams in 2001.

=== College statistics ===
Year	Games	Rushes	Yards	Average	TD
1998	12	41	197	4.8	2
1999	9	51	292	5.7	3
2000	12	136	598	4.4	6
2001	12	251	1331	5.2	16
Total	45	479	2,418	5.0	27

== Professional career ==
Wells was selected by the Houston Texans in the fourth round, with the 99th overall pick, of the 2002 NFL draft. He played for the Texans from 2002 to 2005. He became a free agent after the 2005 season.

Wells signed with the Indianapolis Colts on August 29, 2006. He was released on September 2, 2006.

== Post-football career ==
After his football career, Wells co-founded From the Ground Up Records with fellow NFL player, Charles Grant and Carlos Diaz. The label has signed multiple artists such as Titanium, King Kun, Gangsta Luck, and Solid (American Rapper), and Mullage who are now signed to Jive Records.
