= Georgia Bulldogs football statistical leaders =

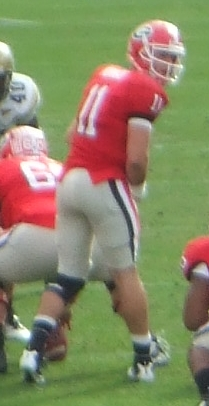
Aaron Murray is the Bulldog's career leader in passing yards and passing touchdowns.

The Georgia Bulldogs football statistical leaders are individual statistical leaders of the Georgia Bulldogs football program in various categories, including passing, rushing, receiving, total offense, defensive stats, and kicking. Within those areas, the lists identify single-game, Single season and career leaders. The Bulldogs represent the University of Georgia in the NCAA Division I FBS Southeastern Conference (SEC).

Although Georgia began competing in intercollegiate football in 1892, the school's official record book often does not generally include statistics from before the 1950s, as records from this era are often incomplete and inconsistent.

These lists are dominated by more recent players for several reasons:

- Since 1950, seasons have increased from 10 games to 11 and then 12 games in length.
- The NCAA didn't allow freshmen to play varsity football until 1972 (with the exception of the World War II years), allowing players to have four-year careers.
- Bowl games only began counting toward single-season and career statistics in 2002. The Bulldogs have played in a bowl game every year since this decision, giving recent players at least one extra game each year to accumulate statistics. The Bulldogs have played in the College Football Playoff National Championship three times (in 2017, 2021, and 2022), giving players in those seasons yet another game. Similarly, the Bulldogs have played in the SEC Championship Game 10 times since first qualifying in 2002.
- The Bulldog teams under recent head coach Mark Richt, who coached from 2001 through 2015, have had some of the highest-gaining offenses in Georgia history. All 5 of the top 5 seasons in team total offense have come under Richt.
- From 2018 through 2025, players were allowed to participate in as many as four games in a redshirt season; previously, playing in even one game "burned" the redshirt. In 2024 and 2025, postseason games did not count against the four-game limit. These changes to redshirt rules have given very recent players several extra games to accumulate statistics.
- Starting in 2026, redshirting has been prohibited, but players have five years of full athletic eligibility. Players who had remaining eligibility under previous rules at the end of the 2025 season will benefit from the new rule. The first recruiting class to be fully affected by the new rule is the 2027 entering class.
- Due to COVID-19 issues, the NCAA ruled that the 2020 season would not count against the athletic eligibility of any football player, giving everyone who played in that season the opportunity for five years of eligibility instead of the normal four.

These lists are updated through Week 12 of the 2026 season. Players active for Georgia in 2026 are in bold. The Georgia Football Media Guide generally does not list a full top 10 in the single-game records.

== Passing ==
=== Passing yards ===
Career
Rank	Player	Yards	Years
1	Aaron Murray	13,166	2010 2011 2012 2013
2	David Greene	11,528	2001 2002 2003 2004
3	Eric Zeier	11,153	1991 1992 1993 1994
4	Stetson Bennett	8,428	2019 2020 2021 2022
5	Jake Fromm	8,224	2017 2018 2019
6	Carson Beck	7,912	2021 2022 2023 2024
7	Matthew Stafford	7,731	2006 2007 2008
8	Quincy Carter	6,447	1998 1999 2000
9	Mike Bobo	6,334	1994 1995 1996 1997
10	**Gunner Stockton**	5,872	2023 2024 2025 2026

Single season
Rank	Player	Yards	Year
1	Stetson Bennett	4,127	2022
2	Carson Beck	3,941	2023
3	Aaron Murray	3,893	2012
4	Eric Zeier	3,525	1993
5	Carson Beck	3,485	2024
5	Matthew Stafford	3,459	2008
7	Eric Zeier	3,396	1994
8	David Greene	3,307	2003
9	Aaron Murray	3,149	2011
10	Aaron Murray	3,075	2013

Single game
Rank	Player	Yards	Year	Opponent
1	Eric Zeier	544	1993	Southern Miss
2	Eric Zeier	485	1994	South Carolina
3	Carson Beck	459	2024	Mississippi State
4	Eric Zeier	441	1994	Vanderbilt
5	Carson Beck	439	2024	Alabama

=== Passing touchdowns ===
Career
Rank	Player	TDs	Years
1	Aaron Murray	121	2010 2011 2012 2013
2	Jake Fromm	78	2017 2018 2019
3	David Greene	72	2001 2002 2003 2004
4	Eric Zeier	67	1991 1992 1993 1994
5	Stetson Bennett	66	2019 2020 2021 2022
6	Carson Beck	58	2021 2022 2023 2024
7	Matthew Stafford	51	2006 2007 2008
8	**Gunner Stockton**	49	2023 2024 2025 2026
9	Mike Bobo	38	1994 1995 1996 1997
10	Quincy Carter	35	1998 1999 2000

Single season
Rank	Player	TDs	Year
1	Aaron Murray	36	2012
2	Aaron Murray	35	2011
3	Jake Fromm	30	2018
4	Stetson Bennett	29	2021
5	Carson Beck	28	2024
6	Stetson Bennett	27	2022
7	Aaron Murray	26	2013
8	Matthew Stafford	25	2008
9	Eric Zeier	24	1993
	Eric Zeier	24	1994
	D. J. Shockley	24	2005
	Joe Cox	24	2009
	Aaron Murray	24	2010
	Jake Fromm	24	2017
	Jake Fromm	24	2019
	Carson Beck	24	2023
	Gunner Stockton	24	2025

Single game
Rank	Player	TDs	Year	Opponent
1	David Greene	5	2004	LSU
	D. J. Shockley	5	2005	Boise State
	Matthew Stafford	5	2008	Georgia Tech
	Joe Cox	5	2009	Arkansas
	Aaron Murray	5	2011	New Mexico State
	Aaron Murray	5	2012	Nebraska
	Stetson Bennett	5	2021	UAB
	Carson Beck	5	2024	Tennessee Tech
	Carson Beck	5	2024	Georgia Tech
	Gunner Stockton	5	2026	Western Kentucky

== Rushing ==
=== Rushing yards ===
Career
Rank	Player	Yards	Years
1	Herschel Walker	5,259	1980 1981 1982
2	Nick Chubb	4,769	2014 2015 2016 2017
3	Sony Michel	3,638	2014 2015 2016 2017
4	Todd Gurley	3,285	2012 2013 2014
5	Garrison Hearst	3,232	1990 1991 1992
6	Lars Tate	3,017	1984 1985 1986 1987
7	D'Andre Swift	2,885	2017 2018 2019
8	Knowshon Moreno	2,734	2007 2008
9	Rodney Hampton	2,668	1987 1988 1989
10	Thomas Brown	2,646	2004 2005 2006 2007

Single season
Rank	Player	Yards	Year
1	Herschel Walker	1,891	1981
2	Herschel Walker	1,752	1982
3	Herschel Walker	1,616	1980
4	Garrison Hearst	1,594	1992
5	Nick Chubb	1,547	2014
6	Knowshon Moreno	1,400	2008
7	Todd Gurley	1,385	2012
8	Nick Chubb	1,345	2017
9	Knowshon Moreno	1,334	2007
10	Musa Smith	1,324	2002

Single game
Rank	Player	Yards	Year	Opponent
1	Herschel Walker	283	1980	Vanderbilt
2	Nick Chubb	266	2014	Louisville
3	Herschel Walker	265	1981	Ole Miss
4	Garrison Hearst	246	1992	Vanderbilt
5	Charley Trippi	239	1945	Florida
6	Herschel Walker	238	1980	Florida
7	Rodney Hampton	227	1987	Ole Miss

=== Rushing touchdowns ===
Career
Rank	Player	TDs	Years
1	Herschel Walker	49	1980 1981 1982
2	Nick Chubb	44	2014 2015 2016 2017
3	Lars Tate	36	1984 1985 1986 1987
	Todd Gurley	36	2012 2013 2014
5	Garrison Hearst	33	1990 1991 1992
	Sony Michel	33	2014 2015 2016 2017
7	Charley Trippi	32	1942 1945 1946
8	Frank Sinkwich	30	1940 1941 1942
	Knowshon Moreno	30	2007 2008
10	Robert Edwards	27	1994 1995 1996 1997
	Tim Worley	27	1985 1986 1988

Single season
Rank	Player	TDs	Year
1	Garrison Hearst	19	1992
2	Herschel Walker	18	1981
3	Tim Worley	17	1988
	Todd Gurley	17	2012
5	Frank Sinkwich	16	1942
	Herschel Walker	16	1982
	Lars Tate	16	1986
	Knowshon Moreno	16	2008
	Sony Michel	16	2017

Single game
Rank	Player	TDs	Year	Opponent
1	Washaun Ealey	5	2010	Kentucky
2	Robert Edwards	4	1995	South Carolina
	Herschel Walker	4	1981	Temple

== Receiving ==
=== Receptions ===
Career
Rank	Player	Rec	Years
1	Terrence Edwards	204	1999 2000 2001 2002
2	Brice Hunter	182	1992 1993 1994 1995
3	Brock Bowers	175	2021 2022 2023
4	Malcolm Mitchell	174	2012 2013 2014 2015
5	A. J. Green	166	2008 2009 2010
6	Fred Gibson	161	2001 2002 2003 2004
7	Mohamed Massaquoi	158	2005 2006 2007 2008
8	Reggie Brown	144	2000 2001 2002 2003 2004
	Hines Ward	144	1994 1995 1996 1997
10	Tavarres King	136	2008 2009 2010 2011 2012

Single season
Rank	Player	Rec	Year
1	Zachariah Branch	81	2025
2	Brice Hunter	76	1993
3	Brock Bowers	63	2022
4	Brice Hunter	59	1994
	Terrence Edwards	59	2002
	Dominic Lovett	59	2024
7	Mohamed Massaquoi	58	2008
	Malcolm Mitchell	58	2015
	Ladd McConkey	58	2022
10	A. J. Green	57	2010

Single game
Rank	Player	Rec	Year	Opponent
1	Shannon Mitchell	15	1993	Florida
2	Michael Johnson	13	2002	Auburn
3	Randy McMichael	12	2000	Georgia Tech
	George Pickens	12	2019	Baylor
5	Damien Gary	11	2000	Georgia Tech
	Mohamed Massaquoi	11	2008	Kentucky

=== Receiving yards ===
Career
Rank	Player	Yards	Years
1	Terrence Edwards	3,093	1999 2000 2001 2002
2	Fred Gibson	2,884	2001 2002 2003 2004
3	A. J. Green	2,619	2008 2009 2010
4	Tavarres King	2,602	2008 2009 2010 2011 2012
5	Brock Bowers	2,538	2021 2022 2023
6	Brice Hunter	2,373	1992 1993 1994 1995
7	Malcolm Mitchell	2,350	2012 2013 2014 2015
8	Mohamed Massaquoi	2,282	2005 2006 2007 2008
9	Lindsay Scott	2,098	1978 1979 1980 1981
10	Reggie Brown	2,008	2000 2001 2002 2003 2004

Single season
Rank	Player	Yards	Year
1	Terrence Edwards	1,004	2002
2	Brice Hunter	970	1993
3	A. J. Green	963	2008
4	Tavarres King	950	2012
5	Brock Bowers	942	2022
6	Mohamed Massaquoi	920	2008
7	Hines Ward	900	1996
8	Brock Bowers	882	2021
9	Hason Graham	881	1994
10	Malcolm Mitchell	865	2015

Single game
Rank	Player	Yards	Year	Opponent
1	Tavarres King	205	2011	Michigan State
2	Fred Gibson	201	2001	Kentucky
3	Lamar Davis	198	1942	Cincinnati
4	Jermaine Burton	197	2020	Mississippi State
5	Terrence Edwards	196	1999	Utah State
6	Pat Hodgson	192	1963	Miami (FL)

=== Receiving touchdowns ===
Career
Rank	Player	TDs	Years
1	Terrence Edwards	30	1999 2000 2001 2002
2	Brock Bowers	26	2021 2022 2023
3	A. J. Green	23	2008 2009 2010
4	Tavarres King	21	2008 2009 2010 2011 2012
5	Fred Gibson	20	2001 2002 2003 2004
	Chris Conley	20	2011 2012 2013 2014
7	Brice Hunter	19	1992 1993 1994 1995
8	Mohamed Massaquoi	17	2005 2006 2007 2008
	Michael Bennett	17	2011 2012 2013 2014
10	Hason Graham	16	1992 1993 1994
	Juan Daniels	16	1994 1995 1996
	Malcolm Mitchell	16	2012 2013 2014 2015

Single season
Rank	Player	TDs	Year
1	Brock Bowers	13	2021
2	Terrence Edwards	11	2002
3	Riley Ridley	9	2018
	Brice Hunter	9	1993
	Hason Graham	9	1994
	Terrence Edwards	9	1999
	A. J. Green	9	2010
	Tavarres King	9	2012
9	A. J. Green	8	2008
	Mohamed Massaquoi	8	2008
	Tavarres King	8	2011
	George Pickens	8	2019

Single game
Rank	Player	TDs	Year	Opponent
1	George Poschner	3	1942	Florida
	Don Potterifled	3	1962	Auburn
	Terrence Edwards	3	2002	Kentucky
	Mohamed Massaquoi	3	2008	Georgia Tech
	Lawson Luckie	3	2025	Ole Miss
	Talyn Taylor	3	2026	Ole Miss

== Total offense ==
Total offense is the sum of passing, rushing, and receiving statistics. It does not include returns.

=== Total offense yards ===
Career
Rank	Player	Yards	Years
1	Aaron Murray	13,554	2010 2011 2012 2013
2	David Greene	11,270	2001 2002 2003 2004
3	Eric Zeier	10,841	1991 1992 1993 1994
4	Stetson Bennett	8,958	2019 2020 2021 2022
5	Carson Beck	8,157	2021 2022 2023 2024
6	Matthew Stafford	7,944	2006 2007 2008
7	Jake Fromm	7,550	2017 2018 2019
8	Quincy Carter	7,053	1998 1999 2000
9	**Gunner Stockton**	6,624	2023 2024 2025 2026
10	Mike Bobo	6,054	1994 1995 1996 1997

Single season
Rank	Player	Yards	Year
1	Stetson Bennett	4,332	2022
2	Carson Beck	4,057	2023
3	Aaron Murray	3,825	2012
4	Carson Beck	3,556	2024
5	Matthew Stafford	3,499	2008
6	Eric Zeier	3,482	1993
7	Eric Zeier	3,457	1994
8	Gunner Stockton	3,261	2025
9	Aaron Murray	3,261	2013
10	Aaron Murray	3,260	2011

Single game
Rank	Player	Yards	Year	Opponent
1	Eric Zeier	527	1993	Southern Miss
2	Eric Zeier	494	1994	South Carolina
3	Carson Beck	467	2024	Mississippi State
4	Aaron Murray	452	2013	Auburn
5	Eric Zeier	451	1994	Vanderbilt
6	Carson Beck	448	2024	Alabama
7	Aaron Murray	445	2013	North Texas
8	Eric Zeier	432	1994	Kentucky
9	Aaron Murray	430	2012	Nebraska
10	Eric Zeier	424	1994	Tennessee

=== Touchdowns responsible for ===
"Touchdowns responsible for" is the NCAA's official term for combined passing and rushing touchdowns.

Career
Rank	Player	TDs	Years
1	Aaron Murray	137	2010 2011 2012 2013
2	Stetson Bennett	80	2019 2020 2021 2022
3	David Greene	77	2001 2002 2003 2004
4	Jake Fromm	74	2017 2018 2019
5	Eric Zeier	71	1991 1992 1993 1994
6	Carson Beck	63	2021 2022 2023 2024
7	**Gunner Stockton**	62	2023 2024 2025 2026
8	Frank Sinkwich	60	1940 1941 1942
9	Matthew Stafford	57	2006 2007 2008
10	Herschel Walker	52	1980 1981 1982

Single season
Rank	Player	TDs	Year
1	Aaron Murray	39	2012
2	Aaron Murray	37	2011
2	Stetson Bennett	37	2022
4	Gunner Stockton	34	2025
5	Aaron Murray	33	2013
6	Jake Fromm	30	2018
6	Stetson Bennett	30	2021
8	Carson Beck	29	2024
9	D. J. Shockley	28	2005
9	Aaron Murray	28	2010
9	Carson Beck	28	2023

Single game
Rank	Player	TDs	Year	Opponent
1	D. J. Shockley	6	2005	Boise State
	Stetson Bennett	6	2022	TCU
3	Frank Sinkwich	5	1942	Cincinnati
	Ray Goff	5	1976	Florida
	Robert Edwards	5	1995	South Carolina
	David Greene	5	2004	LSU
	Matthew Stafford	5	2008	Georgia Tech
	Joe Cox	5	2009	Arkansas
	Washaun Ealey	5	2010	Kentucky
	Aaron Murray	5	2011	New Mexico State
	Aaron Murray	5	2012	Nebraska
	Aaron Murray	5	2013	LSU
	Stetson Bennett	5	2021	UAB
	Carson Beck	5	2024	Tennessee Tech
	Carson Beck	5	2024	Georgia Tech
	Gunner Stockton	5	2025	Ole Miss
	Gunner Stockton	5	2025	Texas
	Gunner Stockton	5	2026	Western Kentucky
	Gunner Stockton	5	2026	Ole Miss

== Defense ==
=== Interceptions ===
Career
Rank	Player	Ints	Years
1	Jake Scott	16	1967 1968
	Bacarri Rambo	16	2009 2010 2011 2012
	Dominick Sanders	16	2014 2015 2016 2017
4	Jeff Hipp	14	1979 1980
5	Terry Hoage	14	1981 1982 1983
6	Scott Woerner	13	1978 1979 1980
7	Jeff Sanchez	13	1982 1984
8	Ben Smith	13	1987 1988 1989
9	Kirby Smart	13	1995 1996 1997 1998

Single season
Rank	Player	Ints	Year
1	Terry Hoage	12	1982
2	Jake Scott	10	1968
3	Ben Smith	10	1989
4	Jeff Sanchez	9	1982
5	Eli Maricich	8	1948
6	Jeff Hipp	8	1980
7	Bacarri Rambo	8	2011
8	Buck Swindle	7	1969
9	Tony Taylor	7	2006

Single game
Rank	Player	Ints	Year	Opponent
1	Joe Jacukra	3	1948	Alabama
2	Jeff Hipp	3	1979	Georgia Tech
3	Terry Hoage	3	1982	Vanderbilt
4	Tra Battle	3	2006	Auburn

=== Tackles ===
Career
Rank	Player	Tackles	Years
1	Ben Zambiasi	467	1974 1975 1976 1977
2	Greg Bright	453	1994 1995 1996 1997
3	Tommy Thurson	448	1980 1981 1982 1983
4	John Brantley	415	1984 1985 1986 1987
5	Nate Taylor	390	1979 1980 1981 1982
6	Knox Culpepper	383	1981 1982 1983 1984
7	John Little	381	1983 1984 1985 1986
8	Randell Godfrey	365	1992 1993 1994 1995
9	Bill Goldberg	348	1986 1987 1988 1989
10	Amarlo Herrera	334	2011 2012 2013 2014

Single season
Rank	Player	Tackles	Year
1	Knox Culpepper	170	1984
2	Knox Culpepper	166	1983
3	Ben Zambiasi	165	1977
4	Ricky McBride	160	1978
	John Brantley	160	1986
6	John Brantley	154	1987
7	Keith Harris	148	1974
	Ben Zambiasi	148	1975
9	Bill Mitchell	145	1985
10	Ben Zambiasi	144	1976

Single game
Rank	Player	Tackles	Year	Opponent
1	Knox Culpepper	26	1983	Georgia Tech
2	Knox Culpepper	25	1983	Auburn
	John Kelly	25	1984	Georgia Tech
4	Steve Kelly	24	1981	Auburn

=== Sacks ===
Career
Rank	Player	Sacks	Years
1	David Pollack	36.0	2001 2002 2003 2004
2	Richard Tardits	29.0	1985 1986 1987 1988
3	Jimmy Payne	28.0	1978 1979 1980 1981 1982
	Jarvis Jones	28.0	2011 2012
5	Mitch Davis	27.5	1990 1991 1992 1993
6	Freddie Gilbert	26.0	1980 1981 1982 1983
7	Quentin Moses	25.0	2003 2004 2005 2006
8	Leonard Floyd	22.5	2012 2013 2014 2015
9	Justin Houston	20.0	2008 2009 2010
10	Jordan Jenkins	19.0	2012 2013 2014 2015

Single season
Rank	Player	Sacks	Year
1	Jarvis Jones	14.5	2012
2	David Pollack	14.0	2002
3	Jarvis Jones	13.5	2011
4	Mitch Davis	13.0	1993
5	David Pollack	12.5	2004
6	Jimmy Payne	12.0	1981
7	Richard Tardits	12.0	1988
8	Quentin Moses	11.5	2005
9	Freddie Gilbert	11.0	1983
10	Greg Waters	11.0	1985

Single game
Rank	Player	Sacks	Year	Opponent
1	Freddie Gilbert	5.0	1983	Temple
2	Freddie Gilbert	4.0	1981	Florida
	Richard Tardits	4.0	1988	TCU
	Mo Lewis	4.0	1989	Ole Miss
	Charles Grant	4.0	2001	Auburn
	Jarvis Jones	4.0	2011	Florida
7	Josh Mallard	3.5	1998	Kentucky

== Kicking ==
The 2014 Georgia Football Media Guide does not list a full top 10 in field goal kicking stats.

=== Field goals made ===
Career
Rank	Player	FGs	Years
1	Billy Bennett	87	2000 2001 2002 2003
2	Rodrigo Blankenship	80	2016 2017 2018 2019
3	Kevin Butler	77	1981 1982 1983 1984
4	Blair Walsh	76	2008 2009 2010 2011
5	**Peyton Woodring**	72	2023 2024 2025 2026
6	Marshall Morgan	64	2012 2013 2014 2015
7	Kanon Parkman	61	1991 1993 1994 1995
	Jack Podlesny	61	2020 2021 2022
9	Rex Robinson	56	1977 1978 1979 1980

Single season
Rank	Player	FGs	Year
1	Billy Bennett	31	2003
2	Rodrigo Blankenship	27	2019
3	Billy Bennett	26	2002
	Jack Podlesny	26	2022
5	Kevin Butler	23	1984
	Brandon Coutu	23	2005

Single game
Rank	Player	FGs	Year	Opponent
1	Billy Bennett	6	2001	Georgia Tech

=== Field goal percentage ===
Career
Rank	Player	FG%	Years
1	**Peyton Woodring**	86.7%	2023 2024 2025 2026
2	Rodrigo Blankenship	82.5%	2016 2017 2018 2019
3	Jack Podlesny	82.4%	2020 2021 2022
4	Brandon Coutu	80.3%	2004 2005 2006 2007
5	Billy Bennett	79.1%	2000 2001 2002 2003
6	Kevin Butler	78.6%	1981 1982 1983 1984
7	Marshall Morgan	76.2%	2012 2013 2014 2015
8	Blair Walsh	73.8%	2008 2009 2010 2011
9	Kanon Parkman	71.8%	1991 1993 1994 1995

Single season
Rank	Player	FG%	Year
1	Billy Bennett	92.9%	2000
2	Marshall Morgan	91.7%	2013
3	Peyton Woodring	91.3%	2024
4	Blair Walsh	90.9%	2009
5	Brandon Coutu	90.9%	2006
6	Peyton Woodring	89.5%	2025
7	Rex Robinson	88.2%	1978
8	Blair Walsh	87.0%	2010
9	Rodrigo Blankenship	87.0%	2017
10	Peyton Woodring	84.0%	2023
