= Stetson Bennett =

American football player (born 1997)

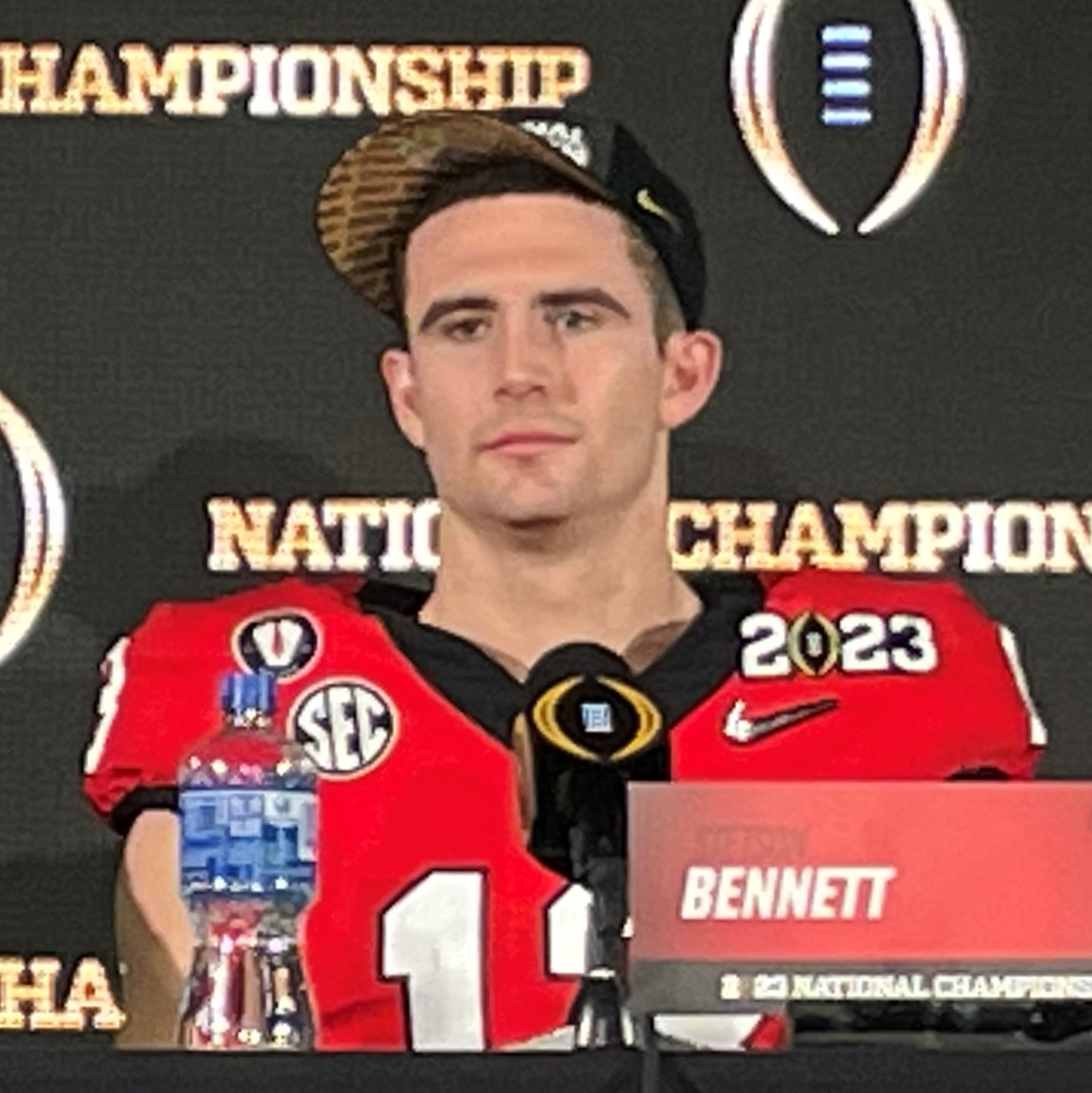
- Bennett at the press conference after the 2023 CFP title game

No. 13 – Los Angeles Rams
- Position: Quarterback
- Roster status: Active

Personal information
- Born: October 28, 1997 (age 29); Atlanta, Georgia, U.S.
- Listed height: 5 ft 11 in (1.80 m)
- Listed weight: 192 lb (87 kg)

Career information
- High school: Pierce County (Blackshear, Georgia)
- College: Georgia (2017, 2019–2022); Jones (2018)
- NFL draft: 2023: 4th round, 128th overall pick

Career history
- Los Angeles Rams (2023–present)

Awards and highlights
- 2× CFP national champion (2021, 2022); 2× CFP National Championship Game Offensive MVP (2022, 2023); Manning Award (2022); Burlsworth Trophy (2022); Second-team All-SEC (2022)

Career NFL statistics as of Week 1, 2026
- Passing attempts: 3
- Passing completions: 2
- Completion percentage: 66.7%
- TD–INT: 0–0
- Passing yards: 13
- Passer rating: 75.7
- Stats at Pro Football Reference

Stetson Fleming Bennett IV (born October 28, 1997) is an American professional football quarterback for the Los Angeles Rams of the National Football League (NFL). He played college football for the Jones College Bobcats and Georgia Bulldogs. Nicknamed "The Mailman", he started his career as a walk-on at Georgia before transferring to Jones College. Bennett transferred back to Georgia where he won consecutive national championships in 2021 and 2022, joining A. J. McCarron, Tommie Frazier, Jerry Tagge, and Steve Davis as the only quarterbacks to win consecutive NCAA national championships.

== Early life ==
Bennett was born on October 28, 1997, in Atlanta, Georgia. In first grade, his family moved from Atlanta to Nahunta, Georgia. In eighth grade, his family moved to Blackshear, Georgia, where he played high school football at Pierce County High School. There, he led the school to three consecutive state playoff appearances, throwing for 3,724 yards, running for 500 more and scoring 40 total touchdowns as a senior. Bennett was a two-star quarterback coming out of high school and his only FBS scholarship offer came from Middle Tennessee State as coaches thought he was too short and too light—he was 5 feet 9.5 inches (1.765 m) and 185 pounds (84 kg) at the time.

== College career ==
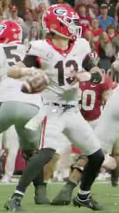
Bennett with Georgia in 2021

=== Georgia (first stint) ===
Bennett was a walk-on at Georgia his freshman season in 2017.

He did not take a snap the whole season. After five-star high school quarterback Justin Fields committed to Georgia in 2018, Bennett decided to transfer to Jones College.

=== Jones College ===
After his transfer, Bennett played in 12 games and threw for 16 touchdowns and 1,840 yards in his sophomore season. He was a three-star prospect heading into his transfer. He was about to join the Louisiana-Lafayette Ragin' Cajuns, but he ended up returning to Georgia. The Bulldogs were in need of a backup quarterback after Fields transferred to Ohio State. Georgia offered Bennett a scholarship. He accepted and became Georgia's second-string quarterback.

=== Georgia (second stint) ===
==== 2019–2020 ====
As Jake Fromm's backup in 2019, Bennett had two touchdowns and one interception on the season as a junior. He also had one rushing touchdown. He most notably appeared in the Southeastern Conference (SEC) Championship Game when Fromm went down with an injury.

Heading into his senior season (2020), Bennett started the season as a backup quarterback to D'Wan Mathis. Mathis was named the starter after Jamie Newman, the planned starter, opted out of the season. Bennett became the starter after poor play from Mathis. A few months later, USC transfer JT Daniels took the starting job. Bennett appeared in eight games, of which he played significant time in six of them. He finished with 1,179 passing yards, eight passing touchdowns, and six interceptions to go along with two rushing touchdowns.

==== 2021 ====
Bennett began his 5th-year senior season as the backup to JT Daniels. He made his first appearance and first start of the 2021 season against the UAB Blazers after Daniels went down with an oblique injury. In that game, Bennett tied the record for most touchdowns in a game by a Georgia quarterback, with five. Bennett was trusted with the starting job for the rest of the season, and he led the Bulldogs to a 12–0 record. He finished the season with 29 touchdowns and seven interceptions.

On December 4, 2021, Bennett threw for three touchdowns and two interceptions in the 41–24 loss in the SEC Championship Game against the Alabama Crimson Tide. He was criticized for the loss, leading many to believe that JT Daniels should get the start against Michigan in the Orange Bowl. Bennett remained the starter and helped lead the Bulldogs to a victory over Michigan. In the 34–11 victory, Bennett passed for 313 yards and three touchdowns. Bennett led the Bulldogs to a victory in the 2022 College Football Playoff National Championship game in a rematch against Alabama to give Georgia their first national title since 1980. Bennett passed for 224 yards and two touchdowns in the 33–18 victory.

==== 2022 ====
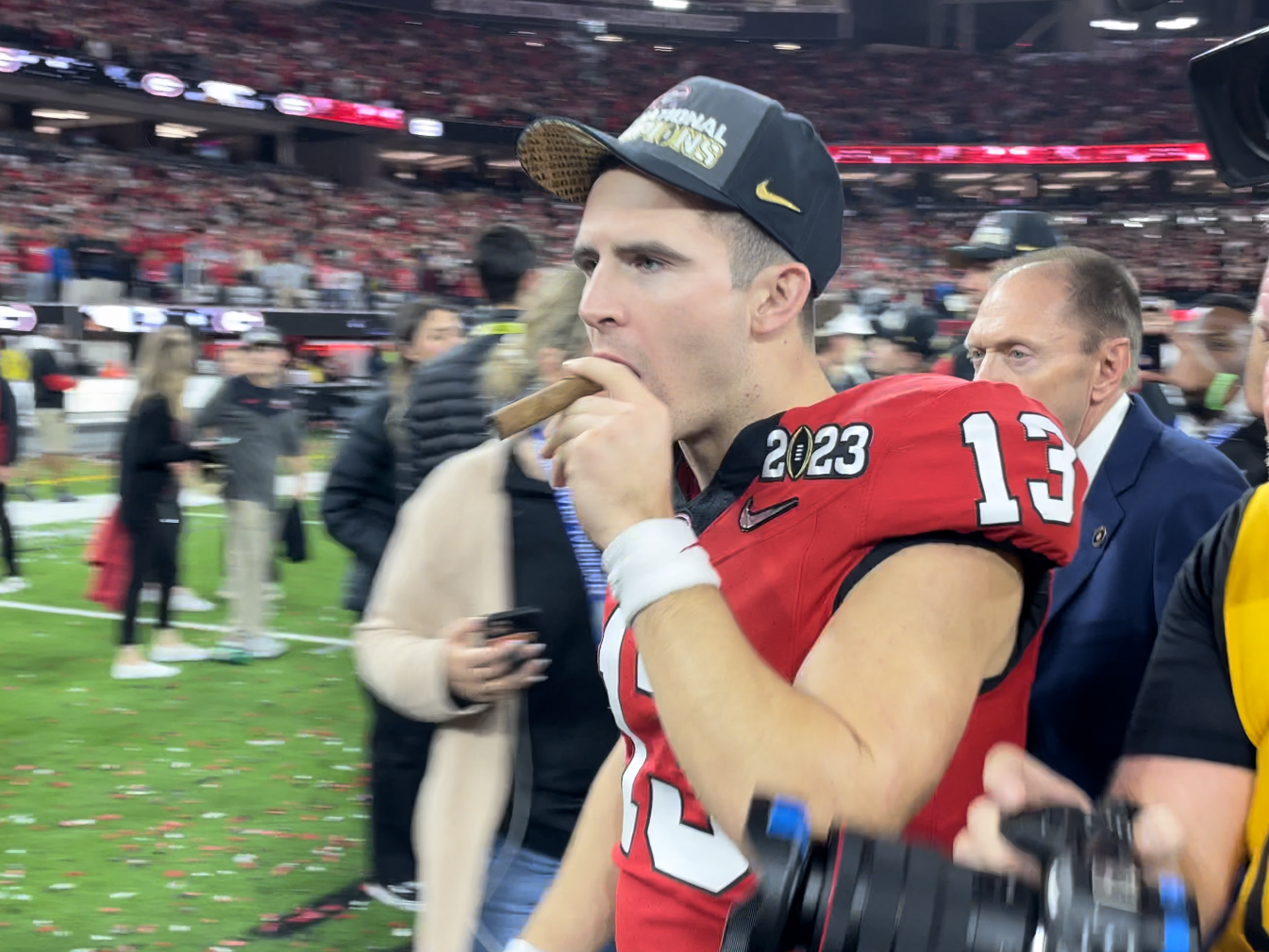
Bennett celebrates with a cigar after the Bulldogs win in the 2023 CFP title game

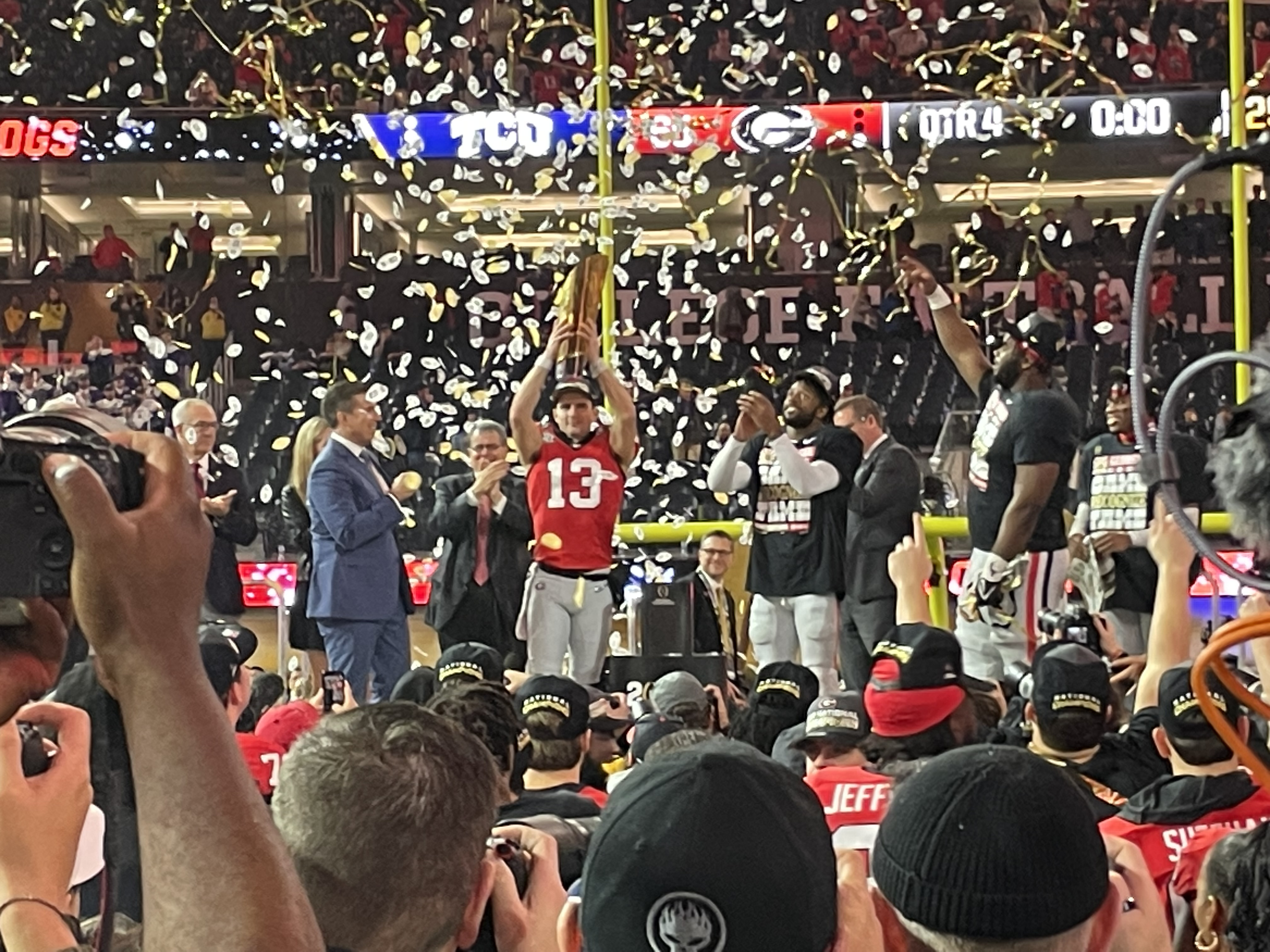
Bennett hoists the CFP Trophy after the 2023 title game

On January 20, 2022, just ten days after winning the National Championship and amid speculation that he would transfer, Bennett announced his return to Georgia. In the preseason, Adam Rittenberg named Bennett a Heisman Trophy candidate.

Bennett entered his 6th-year senior season as the starter, and in the season opener against Oregon, he threw for a then career-high 368 yards while throwing and rushing for three total touchdowns in a 49–3 rout. After his performance, he was named the Walter Camp National Player of the Week and the Manning Award Quarterback of the Week. The following week, Bennett threw for 300 yards, before being replaced in the third-quarter by backup Carson Beck, in a 33–0 victory.

During the 2022 regular season, Bennett led Georgia to a 13–0 record, including an SEC Championship. During the 2022 SEC Championship Game, he passed for four touchdowns and 274 yards and was named the game's Most Valued Player (MVP) in a 50–30 victory over the LSU Tigers. Bennett finished the year with 20 passing touchdowns, 3,425 passing yards, six interceptions, and seven rushing touchdowns. On December 5, 2022, Bennett was named a finalist for the Heisman Trophy, finishing fourth.

Bennett and the Bulldogs remained #1 and faced up against C. J. Stroud and the #4 ranked Ohio State in the 2022 Peach Bowl. Bennett and the Bulldogs beat Ohio State with a score of 42–41 to advance to the 2023 College Football Playoff National Championship for the second consecutive year.

On January 9, 2023, Bennett and the Bulldogs defeated the TCU Horned Frogs in the 2023 College Football Playoff National Championship, with a score of 65–7. He was named the offensive MVP of the game after combining for six total touchdowns. This tied him with Joe Burrow, for the most total touchdowns in a College Football Playoff National Championship Game. With the victory, Bennett led Georgia to the largest margin of victory in any bowl game at the FBS level at the time and becoming just the third team in college football history to finish the season with a record of 15–0.

Bennett finished the season passing for 4,127 yards. With this mark, he surpassed the previous program record for passing yards in a single season, set by Aaron Murray in 2012.

=== College statistics ===
Legend
	Won the CFP National Championship
**Bold**	Career high

Season	Team	Games			Passing								Rushing			
Season	Team	GP	GS	Record	Comp	Att	Pct	Yards	Avg	TD	Int	Rate	Att	Yards	Avg	TD
2017	Georgia	DNP														
2018	Jones College	12	12	10–2	144	258	56.0	1,820	12.6	16	14	125.2	69	148	2.1	4
2019	Georgia	5	0	—	20	27	74.1	260	9.6	2	1	172.0	3	12	4.0	1
2020	Georgia	8	5	3–2	86	155	55.5	1,179	7.6	8	6	128.7	24	54	2.3	2
2021	Georgia	14	12	11–1	185	287	64.5	2,869	**10.0**	**29**	**7**	**176.6**	56	**259**	**4.6**	1
2022	Georgia	**15**	15	**15–0**	**310**	**454**	**68.3**	**4,128**	9.1	27	**7**	161.2	**57**	205	3.6	**10**
NJCAA Career		12	12	10–2	144	258	56.0	1,820	12.6	16	14	125.2	69	148	2.1	4
Career		42	32	29–3	601	924	65.0	8,429	9.1	66	21	160.7	141	530	3.8	14

== Professional career ==
Pre-draft measurables
Height	Weight	Arm length	Hand span	Wingspan	40-yard dash	10-yard split	20-yard split	20-yard shuttle	Vertical jump	Broad jump
5 ft 11 3/8 in (1.81 m)	192 lb (87 kg)	28 7/8 in (0.73 m)	10 in (0.25 m)	6 ft 0 in (1.83 m)	4.67 s	1.59 s	2.65 s	4.20 s	33.5 in (0.85 m)	9 ft 10 in (3.00 m)
All values from the NFL Combine

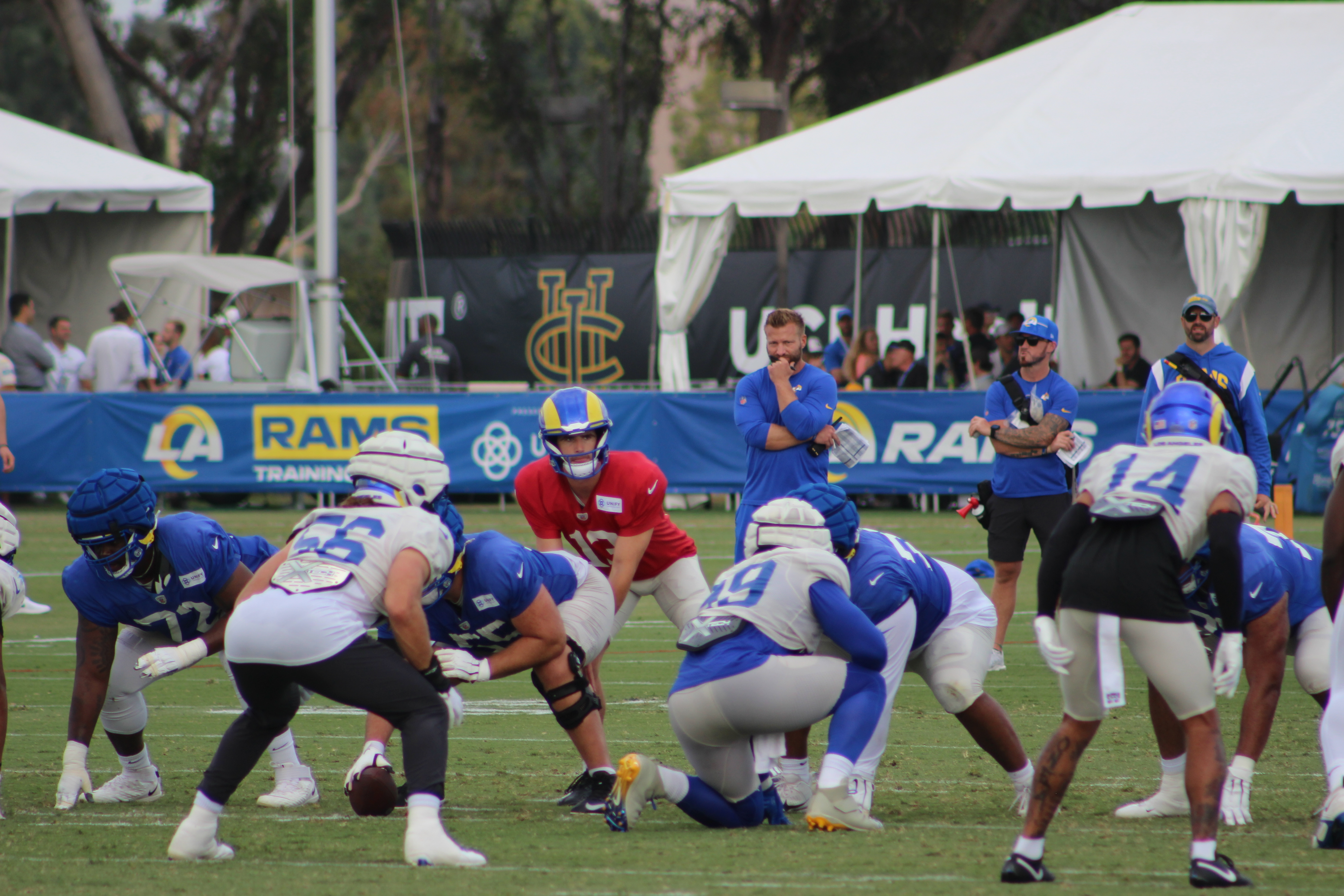
Bennett under center at the Rams training camp in 2023

Bennett was drafted by the Los Angeles Rams in the fourth round, 128th overall, in the 2023 NFL draft. He was placed on the reserve/non-football illness list on September 13, 2023.

With Jimmy Garoppolo being the Rams' backup to Matthew Stafford, Bennett did not play in 2024 and 2025. Following the team's selection of Ty Simpson in the first round of the 2026 NFL draft, Bennett competed with Simpson throughout training camp and preseason to be the team's backup quarterback.

Bennett made his regular season NFL debut on September 10, 2026, during the Rams Week 1 match against the San Francisco 49ers in Melbourne, Australia, completing two of three passes for 13 yards and rushing once for nine yards while playing in the final minutes of L.A.'s 27-7 loss.

== Career statistics ==
Legend
**Bold**	Career high

=== NFL ===
==== Regular season ====
Year	Team	Games			Passing									Rushing					Sacks		Fumbles	
Year	Team	GP	GS	Record	Cmp	Att	Pct	Yds	Avg	Lng	TD	Int	Rtg	Att	Yds	Avg	Lng	TD	Sck	SckY	Fum	Lost
2023	LAR	0	0	—	DNP																	
2024	LAR	0	0	—	DNP																	
2025	LAR	0	0	—	DNP																	
2026	LAR	1	0	0–0	2	3	66.7	13	4.3	8	0	0	75.7	1	9	9.0	9	0	0	0	0	0
Career		1	0	0–0	2	3	66.7	13	4.3	8	0	0	75.7	1	9	9.0	9	0	0	0	0	0

==== Postseason ====
Year	Team	Games			Passing									Rushing					Sacks		Fumbles	
Year	Team	GP	GS	Record	Cmp	Att	Pct	Yds	Y/A	Lng	TD	Int	Rtg	Att	Yds	Avg	Lng	TD	Sck	SckY	Fum	Lost
2023	LAR	0	0	—	DNP																	
2024	LAR	0	0	—	DNP																	
2025	LAR	0	0	—	DNP																	
Career		0	0	0–0	0	0	0.0	0	0.0	0	0	0	0.0	0	0	0.0	0	0	0	0	0	0

== Personal life ==
Stetson Bennett IV is the son of Denise and Stetson Bennett III. His parents met at and graduated from the University of Georgia College of Pharmacy. Bennett is the grandson of Buddy Bennett, who played quarterback for the South Carolina Gamecocks from 1958 to 1960 and later was a coach.

On January 28, 2023, Bennett was arrested in Dallas, Texas on public intoxication charges after banging on doors in a residential area at 6 a.m.
