= Andrew Fuller (disambiguation) =

Andrew Fuller was a Baptist minister.

Andrew Fuller may also refer to:

- Drew Fuller (born 1980), American actor and former male model
- Andy Fuller (born 1974), American football player

== See also ==
- Andrew Fuller Fox (1849–1926), American lawyer and politician
- Andre Fuller (born 2002), American football player
