= Eric Zeier =

American football player (born 1972)

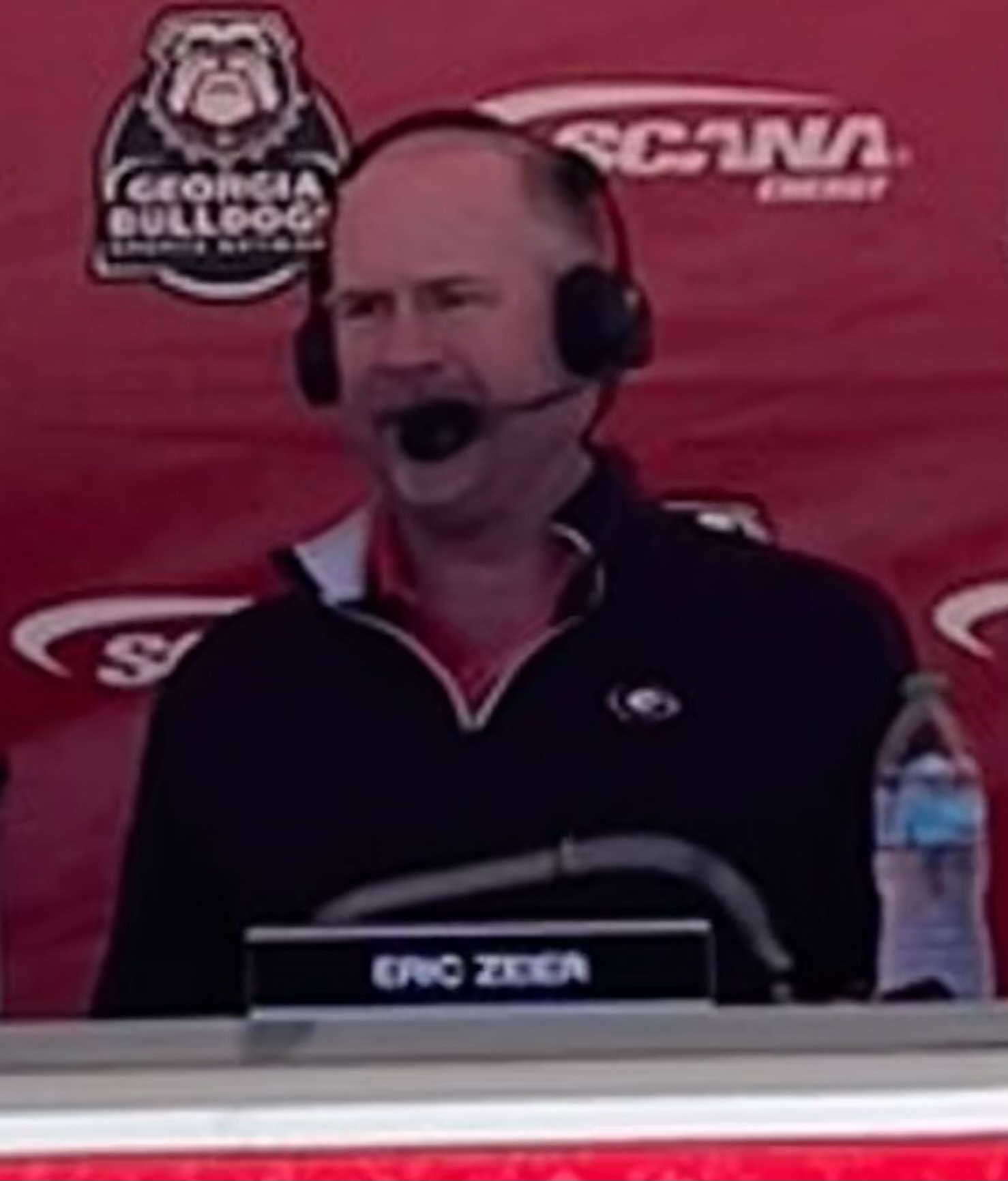
- Zeier in 2024

No. 10, 15
- Position: Quarterback

Personal information
- Born: September 6, 1972 (age 54); Pensacola, Florida, U.S.
- Listed height: 6 ft 1 in (1.85 m)
- Listed weight: 214 lb (97 kg)

Career information
- High school: Marietta (Marietta, Georgia)
- College: Georgia (1991–1994)
- NFL draft: 1995: 3rd round, 84th overall pick

Career history
- Cleveland Browns (1995); Baltimore Ravens (1996–1998); Tampa Bay Buccaneers (1999–2000); Atlanta Falcons (2001)*; Georgia Force (2002)*
- * Offseason or practice squad member only

Awards and highlights
- First-team All-American (1994); 3× Second-team All-SEC (1992, 1993, 1994); SEC Freshman of the Year (1991); Georgia Sports Hall of Fame (2022); Georgia High School Hall of Fame (2022); Florida–Georgia Hall of Fame (2008)

Career NFL statistics
- Passing attempts: 537
- Passing completions: 301
- Completion percentage: 56.1%
- TD–INT: 16–15
- Passing yards: 3,520
- Passer rating: 74.4
- Stats at Pro Football Reference

Eric Royce Zeier (born September 6, 1972) is an American former professional football player who was a quarterback for six seasons in the National Football League (NFL). He played college football for the Georgia Bulldogs, setting 67 school records and 18 Southeastern Conference (SEC) records. In 1994, Zeier became the most prolific passer in SEC history as only the third quarterback in NCAA Division I history to throw for more than 11,000 yards in his career. He earned All-Academic SEC honors in 1992 and 1993 and was named UGA team captain in 1993 and 1994. He was selected by the Cleveland Browns in the third round of the 1995 NFL draft, spending his entire career as a backup. He started a number of games in the NFL for the Browns, Baltimore Ravens, and Tampa Bay Buccaneers.

Zeier continued his affiliation with UGA by serving as the color analyst at away games for the University of Georgia Bulldogs radio network, and following the retirement of Larry Munson, was the permanent color analyst from 2009 to 2025. He also featured on the Bulldog Tailgate Show and half time during home games. He currently resides in his hometown of Marietta, Georgia.

== Early life ==
Zeier was born on September 6, 1972 in Pensacola, Florida. He is of German descent on his father's side of the family. Zeier started his career at Heidelberg American High School in Heidelberg, Germany in the fall of 1988, where he led them to a championship his sophomore year. He played point guard for the varsity basketball team and short stop for the varsity baseball team as well. His father coached the baseball team and was a colonel in the Army. The family made a strategic move to Marietta, Georgia in 1990, transferring to Marietta High School. His #15 jersey was retired at the school. In 2022, he was inducted into the Georgia High School Hall of Fame as part of the inaugural class.

== College career ==
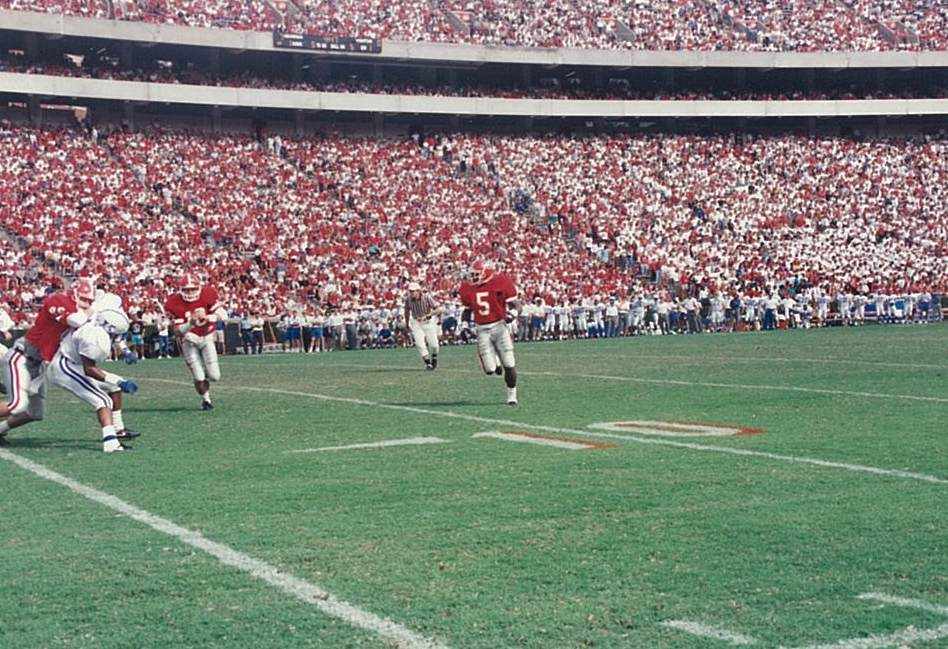
Zeier (#10) playing for the Georgia Bulldogs in 1991, running the option with teammate Garrison Hearst (#5)

After graduating from Marietta, Zeier attended the University of Georgia. Zeier was one of the first notable high school football players to graduate ahead of his class so as to attend his college early and join the football team for spring practices, enrolling in January 1991. At Georgia, he compiled a 26–14–1 record as a starter. He made his debut as a Bulldog on October 5, 1991, against the Clemson Tigers, a game Georgia won 27–12. Zeier went on to start the final seven games of his freshman season and started every game during his final three seasons at Georgia. His tenure included a 4–0 record against the Georgia Tech Yellow Jackets, a victory in the 1991 Independence Bowl over the Arkansas Razorbacks, and a victory in the 1993 Florida Citrus Bowl over the Ohio State Buckeyes.

Zeier finished his college career with 67 school records and 18 Southeastern Conference records. He became the SEC's all-time passing leader with 11,153 yards—a record which has been surpassed only by Peyton Manning and UGA's own David Greene and Aaron Murray. In 1993, his junior season, Zeier threw for 544 yards against the Southern Miss Golden Eagles, a school record. In 1994, Zeier was named the American Football Coaches Association First-team All-American quarterback. Over his four years at Georgia (including bowl games), Zeier completed 877 of 1,461 attempts for 11,153 yards, 67 touchdowns, and 37 interceptions. In 1994, Zeier placed for seventh place in that year's Heisman Trophy voting. He was later inducted into the Florida–Georgia Hall of Fame in 2008, and the Georgia Sports Hall of Fame as part of the class of 2022.

== Professional career ==
=== Cleveland Browns ===
Zeier was selected by the Cleveland Browns in the third round of the 1995 NFL draft. The Browns had traded up with the Green Bay Packers, and he was named as the backup to Vinny Testaverde. On October 30, 1995, Zeier made his first start for the Browns, throwing for 310 yards and a touchdown in a 29–26 overtime win over the Cincinnati Bengals. However, in the next game against the Houston Oilers, Zeier threw three interceptions, one of which was returned 62 yards for a touchdown. With the Browns' record at 4–5, owner Art Modell announced that he would be moving the franchise to Baltimore. Although Zeier started in the next two games, he continued to struggle and against the Packers, he was replaced in the second half by Testaverde.

=== Baltimore Ravens ===
In 1996, Zeier was a member of the inaugural Baltimore Ravens roster, joining the majority of former Browns players and personnel to Baltimore, Maryland. He remained the backup to Testaverde, and only made one appearance for the Ravens during the season, throwing a touchdown and an interception in a 38–20 loss to the San Francisco 49ers. In 1997, Testaverde suffered a knee injury in a 29–27 loss to the Jacksonville Jaguars, and Zeier made his first start for the Ravens the following week in a 31–24 win over the Seattle Seahawks. He then started in the final NFL game at Memorial Stadium, throwing three touchdowns in a 21–19 win over the Tennessee Oilers. In a mixed performance against the Cincinnati Bengals, Zeier threw for 349 yards and two touchdowns, but was sacked seven times, as the Ravens lost 16–14. In 1998, Zeier began the season as the backup to Jim Harbaugh, who the Ravens had traded for in the off-season, while Testaverde was released. In the opening game against the Pittsburgh Steelers, Zeier replaced Harbaugh in the second half due to an injury to his right hand, and then played against the New York Jets and the Jaguars from the second quarter onwards. He was named the starter against the Bengals, where he threw for 254 yards and a touchdown in an 31–24 win. After a bye week, the Ravens went on to lose their next three games, which saw Zeier fail to deal with the blitz, and his season ended due to a thumb injury on his throwing hand sustained against the Green Bay Packers.

=== Tampa Bay Buccaneers ===
During the 1999 NFL draft, Zeier was traded to the Tampa Bay Buccaneers for a sixth round draft pick, and was expected to be the backup to Trent Dilfer. In the opening game against the New York Giants, he came in relief of Dilfer, but threw an interception as the Giants won 17–13. Ahead of a game against the Detroit Lions, head coach Tony Dungy benched Dilfer, ending his consecutive starts streak at 70. Zeier's only start for the Bucs saw him involved in two notable incidents in a 20–3 loss. In the third quarter, a fumble was returned for a touchdown, while in the fourth quarter, Zeier's touchdown pass to Warrick Dunn was called short of the one-yard line upon review, leading to another fumble at the two. The Lions would ice out the game with a field goal. It was later revealed that Zeier suffered bruised ribs in the game, allowing Dilfer to retake the starting job, before he broke his collarbone and Shaun King finished the season under center. In 2000, Zeier re-signed with the Bucs to resume his backup role to King, following Dilfer's departure to the Baltimore Ravens. Zeier made three relief appearances during the season, completing three passes in the 41–0 win over the Chicago Bears.

=== Atlanta Falcons ===
In 2001, Zeier was traded to the Atlanta Falcons for a seventh round draft pick. Prior to his departure, the Bucs had preemptively moved on from him by bringing in two more quarterbacks; signing Brad Johnson as a free agent and claiming Ryan Leaf off waivers. He was initially expected to compete with Doug Johnson for the backup role to Chris Chandler, but the Falcons selected Michael Vick with the first overall pick of the 2001 NFL draft, who was named the backup instead. Zeier was waived during roster cutdowns in September 2001.

=== Georgia Force ===
In 2002, Zeier signed with the Georgia Force of the Arena Football League (AFL), following the franchise's relocation from Tennessee. After the season opener, he initially left camp, before retiring from the league to pursue opportunities in the NFL. He retired later that year to work in mortgage lending.

== Career statistics ==
=== NFL ===
Year	Team	Games			Passing									Rushing					Sacked		Fumbles	
Year	Team	GP	GS	Record	Cmp	Att	Pct	Yds	Y/A	Lng	TD	Int	Rtg	Att	Yds	Y/A	Lng	TD	Sck	SckY	Fum	Lost
1995	CLE	7	4	1–3	82	161	50.9	864	5.4	59	4	9	51.9	15	80	5.3	17	0	15	91	3	0
1996	BAL	1	0	—	10	21	47.6	97	4.6	15	1	1	57.0	2	8	4.0	5	0	4	26	2	0
1997	BAL	5	3	2–1	67	116	57.8	958	8.3	92	7	1	101.1	10	17	1.7	12	0	17	98	3	0
1998	BAL	10	4	1–3	107	181	59.1	1,312	7.2	73	4	3	82.0	11	17	1.5	7	0	18	138	2	0
1999	TB	2	1	0–1	32	35	58.2	270	4.9	38	0	1	64.4	3	7	2.3	8	0	5	36	1	0
2000	TB	3	0	—	3	3	100.0	19	6.3	14	0	0	93.1	2	-2	-1.0	-1	0	0	0	0	0
Career		28	12	4–8	301	537	56.1	3,520	6.6	92	16	15	74.4	43	127	3.0	17	0	59	389	11	0

=== College ===
Year	Team	Games		Passing								Rushing			
Year	Team	GP	GS	Cmp	Att	Pct	Yds	Avg	TD	Int	Rtg	Att	Yds	Avg	TD
1991	Georgia	11	8	159	286	55.6	1,984	2.4	7	4	119.1	41	-199	-4.9	2
1992	Georgia	11	11	151	258	58.5	2,248	4.7	12	12	137.8	37	-131	-3.5	0
1993	Georgia	11	11	269	425	63.3	3,525	5.6	24	7	148.3	59	-43	-0.7	1
1994	Georgia	11	11	259	433	59.8	3,396	5.5	24	14	137.5	21	61	2.9	1
Career		44	41	838	1,402	59.8	11,153	4.8	67	37	253.5	158	-312	-2.0	4

== Broadcasting career ==
Zeier returned to the University of Georgia to take over the duty of color analyst on all away games. He, along with Scott Howard, took the place of long time Georgia announcer Larry Munson. Zeier made his first radio start on September 22, 2007, when the Bulldogs played the Alabama Crimson Tide in an 26–23 overtime win. On September 22, 2008, Munson announced his retirement, and Zeier and Howard would call games for the rest of the 2008 season. On June 19, 2009, Zeier and Howard were named as the permanent announcers, ahead of the 2009 season. Zeier was also heard on the Bulldog Tailgate Show and halftime during the home games with Loran Smith and Neil "Hondo" Williamson. In 2025, Zeier stepped aside from calling games to spend more time with his family; he was succeeded by Josh Brock, who played for the Bulldogs from 2002 to 2005.

== Personal life ==
Zeier has five children from two marriages, with both sons from his first marriage involved in ice hockey. His eldest son, Zeke, played a season of college hockey for the Bethel Royals, while his other son, Ike, played at junior hockey level with the St. Louis Jr. Blues. As of 2026, they are junior coaches in the Nashville Predators organization.

== See also ==
- List of Division I FBS passing yardage leaders
