= 1994 All-SEC football team =

American Football

The 1994 All-SEC football team consisted of American football players selected to the All-Southeastern Conference (SEC) chosen by various selectors for the 1994 college football season.

The Florida Gators won the conference title, beating the Alabama Crimson Tide 24 to 23 in the SEC Championship game. Alabama quarterback Jay Barker was voted SEC Player of the Year.

== Offensive selections ==
=== Quarterbacks ===
- Jay Barker, Alabama (AP-1, Coaches-1)
- Eric Zeier, Georgia (AP-2)

=== Running backs ===
- Stephen Davis, Auburn (AP-1, Coaches-1)
- Sherman Williams, Alabama (AP-1, Coaches-1)
- James Stewart, Tennessee (AP-2)
- Jermaine Johnson, Vanderbilt (AP-2)

=== Wide receivers ===
- Jack Jackson, Florida (AP-1, Coaches-1)
- Frank Sanders, Auburn (AP-1, Coaches-1)
- Eric Moulds, Miss. St. (AP-2)
- Brice Hunter, Georgia (AP-2)
- Hason Graham, Georgia (AP-2)

=== Centers ===
- Shannon Roubique, Auburn (AP-1, Coaches-1)
- Bubba Miller, Tennessee (AP-2)

=== Guards ===
- Kevin Mays, Tennessee (AP-1, Coaches-1)
- Jesse James, Miss. St. (AP-1, Coaches-1)
- Jeff Smith, Tennessee (AP-2)
- Steve Roberts, Georgia (AP-2)

=== Tackles ===
- Willie Anderson, Auburn (AP-1, Coaches-1)
- Jason Odom, Florida (AP-1, Coaches-1)
- Jon Stevenson, Alabama (AP-2, Coaches-1)
- Jason Layman, Tennessee (AP-2)

=== Tight ends ===
- David LaFleur, LSU (AP-1, Coaches-1)
- Andy Fuller, Auburn (AP-2)

== Defensive selections ==
=== Ends ===
- Kevin Carter, Florida (AP-1, Coaches-1)
- Gabe Northern, LSU (AP-1, Coaches-1 [as LB])
- Dameian Jeffries, Alabama (AP-2)
- Stacy Evans, South Carolina (AP-2)

=== Tackles ===
- Ellis Johnson, Florida (AP-1, Coaches-1)
- Mike Pelton, Auburn (AP-1, Coaches-1)
- Shannon Brown, Alabama (AP-2)
- Gary Walker, Auburn (AP-2)

=== Linebackers ===
- Abdul Jackson, Ole Miss (AP-1, Coaches-1)
- Dwayne Curry, Miss. St. (AP-1, Coaches-1)
- Ben Hanks, Florida (AP-2, Coaches-1)
- Gerald Collins, Vanderbilt (AP-1)
- Randall Godfrey, Georgia (AP-2)
- Anthony Harris, Auburn (AP-2)
- Ben Talley, Tennessee (AP-2)
- Dexter Daniels, Florida (Coaches-2)

=== Cornerbacks ===
- Walt Harris, Miss. St. (AP-1, Coaches-1)
- Larry Kennedy, Florida (AP-2, Coaches-1)
- Alundis Brice, Ole Miss (AP-2, Coaches-1)
- Tommy Johnson, Alabama (AP-1)

=== Safeties ===
- Brian Robinson, Auburn (AP-1, Coaches-1)
- Willie Gaston, Alabama (AP-2, Coaches-1)
- Melvin Johnson, Kentucky (AP-1)
- Chris Shelling, Auburn (AP-2)
- Tony Watkins, South Carolina (AP-2)
- Sam Shade, Alabama (AP-2)
- Jason Parker, Tennessee (AP-2)

== Special teams ==
=== Kicker ===
- Judd Davis, Florida (AP-1, Coaches-2)
- Michael Proctor, Alabama (AP-2, Coaches-1)

=== Punter ===
- Terry Daniel, Auburn (AP-1, Coaches-1)
- Shayne Edge, Florida (AP-2, Coaches-2)

== Key ==
AP = Associated Press

Coaches = selected by the SEC coaches

Bold = Consensus first-team selection by both Coaches and AP

== See also ==
- 1994 College Football All-America Team
