= 2013 Capital One Bowl =

American college football game

- 67th Citrus Bowl
Georgia Bulldogs	Nebraska Cornhuskers
(11–2)	(10–3)
SEC	Big Ten
45	31
Head coach: Mark Richt	Head coach: Bo Pelini
AP / Coaches / BCS; 6 / 5 / 7	AP / Coaches / BCS; 23 / 21 / 16
	1	2	3	4	Total
Georgia	16	7	8	14	45
Nebraska	14	10	7	0	31
- Date: January 1, 2013
- Season: 2012
- Stadium: Florida Citrus Bowl
- Location: Orlando, Florida
- MVP: Aaron Murray (Georgia QB)
- Favorite: Georgia by 10
- Referee: Mike Defee (Big 12)
- Attendance: 59,712
- Payout: US$4.5 million

United States TV coverage
- Network: ABC
- Announcers: Rece Davis (play-by-play); Jesse Palmer (analyst); David Pollack (analyst); Samantha Ponder (sideline)
- Nielsen ratings: 6.6

The 2013 Citrus Bowl, known as the Capital One Bowl for sponsorship purposes, was the sixty-seventh edition of the college football bowl game, played on January 1, 2013 at the Florida Citrus Bowl in Orlando, Florida. Part of the 2012–13 bowl season, it featured No. 7 Georgia of the SEC and No. 16 Nebraska of the Big Ten. The game began at 1:00 p.m. EST and was broadcast on ABC.

A record-breaking performance from UGA quarterback Aaron Murray led the Bulldogs to a 45–31 victory in a game that featured over 1,000 combined yards of offense.

== Teams ==
Each team lost its conference championship game, Georgia 32–28 to eventual national champion Alabama and Nebraska 70–31 to unranked Wisconsin.

Georgia and Nebraska met once prior to 2013, a 45–6 Cornhuskers win in the 1969 Sun Bowl.

== Game ==
Georgia took an early lead when Shawn Williams blocked a Brett Maher out of the back of the end zone – though several Bulldogs missed an opportunity to recover the ball for a touchdown, Aaron Murray led a ten-play drive on the ensuing possession to give UGA a 9–0 lead. Nebraska, which entered as a double-digit underdog, mounted a strong response, marching 75 yards to get on the board. It was followed by a Will Compton pick-six of Murray to take a 14–9 lead, but on Georgia's next play from scrimmage, Murray hit Tavarres King on a downfield strike to reclaim the lead.

After intercepting Taylor Martinez in NU territory, Georgia stretched its lead back to nine on a Todd Gurley touchdown. The Cornhuskers again responded to a two-possession Georgia lead, scoring ten unanswered points to take a 24–23 lead into halftime. After the break, NU added to its lead on a thirteen-play drive capped by Rex Burkhead's second touchdown. UGA answered quickly on its ensuing drive, converting a third down to King before tying the game on a deep shot to Chris Conley and two-point conversion to Rhett McGowan.

With the game tied at 31, Nebraska advanced into Georgia territory, but Ameer Abdullah lost a fumble on third down despite NU players insisting tight end Ben Cotton had recovered the ball. Officials declined to review the play, and Georgia mounted a six-play touchdown drive to take the lead. After a Nebraska punt, Murray threw his fifth touchdown in the face of a six-man blitz, a screen pass to Conley that he took 87 yards to the end zone. Nebraska was unable to mount a scoring threat over the remaining eleven minutes and Georgia won 45–31.

Murray was named most valuable player after a hyper-efficient passing performance (a UGA bowl-record 427 yards on just eighteen completions) that included three touchdowns of 49 yards or more. Georgia set a new Citrus Bowl record with 589 yards of offense.

=== Scoring summary ===
Qtr	Time	Drive			Team	Detail	Score	
Qtr	Time	Plays	Yards	TOP	Team	Detail	UGA	NU
1	11:39	–	–	–	UGA	Shawn Williams blocked punt out of end zone	2	0
1	7:54	10	80	3:45	UGA	Arthur Lynch 2-yd pass from Aaron Murray (Marshall Morgan kick)	9	0
1	4:42	7	75	3:12	NU	Jamal Turner 14-yd pass from Taylor Martinez (Brett Maher kick)	9	7
1	4:15	–	–	–	NU	Will Compton 24-yd interception return (Maher kick)	9	14
1	4:04	1	75	0:11	UGA	Tavarres King 75-yd pass from Murray (Morgan kick)	16	14
2	10:33	4	38	1:09	UGA	Todd Gurley 24-yd run (Morgan kick)	23	14
2	8:48	5	46	1:45	NU	Maher 39-yd field goal	23	17
2	4:43	6	76	1:58	NU	Rex Burkhead 16-yd pass from Martinez (Maher kick)	23	24
3	9:42	13	75	5:18	NU	Burkhead 2-yd run (Maher kick)	23	31
3	7:26	5	79	2:16	UGA	Chris Conley 49-yd pass from Murray (Murray pass to Rhett McGowan)	31	31
4	14:52	6	74	2:27	UGA	Keith Marshall 24-yd pass from Murray (Morgan kick)	38	31
4	11:03	3	85	1:22	UGA	Conley 87-yd pass from Murray (Morgan kick)	45	31

=== Individual leaders ===
Team	Category	Player	Statistics
UGA	Passing	Aaron Murray	18/33, 427 yds, 5 TD, 2 INT
UGA	Rushing	Todd Gurley	23 car, 125 yds, TD
UGA	Receiving	Chris Conley	2 rec, 136 yds, 2 TD
NU	Passing	Taylor Martinez	16/27, 204 yds, 2 TD, 2 INT
NU	Rushing	Rex Burkhead	24 car, 140 yds, TD
NU	Receiving	Ben Cotton	2 rec, 69 yds

=== Team statistics ===
Statistic	Georgia	Nebraska
First downs	23	26
Rushes-yards	38–162	52–239
Comp.–att.–yards	18–33–427	16–27–204
Total offense	589	443
Turnovers	2	3
Punts–average	3–39.0	4–34.0
Penalties–yards	7–76	8–69
Time of possession	27:33	32:27

== Starting lineups ==
Georgia	Position		Nebraska
Offense
Arthur Lynch	TE		Ben Cotton
Chris Conley	WR		Kenny Bell
Tavarres King	WR		Quincy Enunwa
Rhett McGowan	WR		Jamal Turner
Aaron Murray	QB		Taylor Martinez
Keith Marshall	RB		Rex Burkhead
Kenarious Gates	LT		Brent Qvale
Dallas Lee	LG		Seung Hoon-Choi
David Andrews	C		Cole Pensick
Chris Burnette	RG		Spencer Long
John Theus	RT		Jeremiah Sirles
Defense
Kwame Geathers	DT		Cameron Meredith
	DT		Thad Randle
Garrison Smith	DE		Jason Ankrah
Cornelius Washington	DE		Eric Martin
Amarlo Herrera	LB		Will Compton
Alec Ogletree	LB		
Jarvis Jones	OLB	NB	Corey Cooper
Branden Smith	OLB	NB	Ciante Evans
Sanders Commings	CB		Andrew Green
Damian Swann	CB		Josh Mitchell
Bacarri Rambo	S		P. J. Smith
Shawn Williams	S		Daimion Stafford
