= 2008 Georgia Bulldogs football team =

American college football season

2008 Georgia Bulldogs football

Capital One Bowl champion

Capital One Bowl, W 24–12 vs. Michigan State
- Conference: Southeastern Conference
- Eastern Division

Ranking
- Coaches: No. 10
- AP: No. 13
- Record: 10–3 (6–2 SEC)
- Head coach: Mark Richt (8th season)
- Offensive coordinator: Mike Bobo (2nd season)
- Offensive scheme: Pro-style
- Defensive coordinator: Willie Martinez (4th season)
- Base defense: 4–3
- Home stadium: Sanford Stadium

2008 Southeastern Conference football standings
	Conf.			Overall
Team	W		L	W		L
Eastern Division
No. 1 Florida x$#	7	–	1	13	–	1
No. 13 Georgia	6	–	2	10	–	3
Vanderbilt	4	–	4	7	–	6
South Carolina	4	–	4	7	–	6
Tennessee	3	–	5	5	–	7
Kentucky	2	–	6	7	–	6
Western Division
No. 6 Alabama x%	8	–	0	12	–	2
No. 14 Ole Miss	5	–	3	9	–	4
LSU	3	–	5	8	–	5
Arkansas	2	–	6	5	–	7
Auburn	2	–	6	5	–	7
Mississippi State	2	–	6	4	–	8
Championship: Florida 31, Alabama 20
# – BCS National Champion; $ – BCS representative as conference champion; % – BCS at-large representative; x – Division champion/co-champions; Rankings from AP Poll

The 2008 Georgia Bulldogs football team competed in American football on behalf of the University of Georgia in 2008. The Bulldogs competed in the East Division of the Southeastern Conference (SEC). This was the Georgia Bulldogs' eighth season under the guidance of head coach Mark Richt. During the pre-game ceremonies on August 30, UGA VII was introduced at Sanford Stadium, replacing UGA VI, who died in June.

Georgia was ranked #1 in both the preseason coaches poll and AP poll, marking the first time Georgia has ever been #1 in the preseason version of either poll. However, they finished the season ranked below the top 10 in the AP poll.

Georgia entered the 2008 season with the longest active winning streak among the 66 BCS conference teams having won their last 7 games of the 2007 season. Among the 120 NCAA FBS teams, only BYU had a longer active winning streak (10 games). Georgia's winning streak ended at 11 games with its loss to Alabama in the 5th game of the 2008 season.

== Schedule ==
Date	Time	Opponent	Rank	Site	TV	Result	Attendance
August 30	12:30 p.m.	Georgia Southern*	No. 1	Sanford Stadium; Athens, GA	CSS PPV	W 45–21	92,746
September 6	3:30 p.m.	Central Michigan*	No. 2	Sanford Stadium; Athens, GA	FSN	W 56–17	92,746
September 13	3:30 p.m.	at South Carolina	No. 2	Williams-Brice Stadium; Columbia, SC (rivalry)	CBS	W 14–7	83,704
September 20	8:00 p.m.	at Arizona State*	No. 3	Sun Devil Stadium; Tempe, AZ	ABC	W 27–10	71,706
September 27	7:45 p.m.	No. 8 Alabama	No. 3	Sanford Stadium; Athens, GA (rivalry) (College GameDay)	ESPN	L 30–41	92,746
October 11	3:30 p.m.	Tennessee	No. 10	Sanford Stadium; Athens, GA (rivalry)	CBS	W 26–14	92,746
October 18	12:30 p.m.	No. 22 Vanderbilt^{†}	No. 10	Sanford Stadium; Athens, GA (rivalry)	Raycom	W 24–14	92,746
October 25	3:30 p.m.	at No. 11 LSU	No. 9	Tiger Stadium; Baton Rouge, LA	CBS	W 52–38	92,904
November 1	3:30 p.m.	vs. No. 5 Florida	No. 8	Jacksonville Municipal Stadium; Jacksonville, FL (rivalry)	CBS	L 10–49	84,649
November 8	12:30 p.m.	at Kentucky	No. 14	Commonwealth Stadium; Lexington, KY	Raycom	W 42–38	70,626
November 15	12:30 p.m.	at Auburn	No. 13	Jordan–Hare Stadium; Auburn, AL (Deep South's Oldest Rivalry)	Raycom	W 17–13	87,451
November 29	12:00 p.m.	No. 18 Georgia Tech*	No. 13	Sanford Stadium; Athens, GA (Clean, Old-Fashioned Hate)	CBS	L 42–45	92,746
January 1, 2009	1:00 p.m.	vs. No. 19 Michigan State*	No. 16	Florida Citrus Bowl; Orlando, FL (Capital One Bowl)	ABC	W 24–12	59,681
*Non-conference game; ^{†}Homecoming; Rankings from AP Poll released prior to the game; All times are in Eastern time

== Rankings ==
Ranking movements Legend: ██ Increase in ranking ██ Decrease in ranking ( ) = First-place votes
	Week																
Poll	Pre	1	2	3	4	5	6	7	8	9	10	11	12	13	14	15	Final
AP	1 (22)	2 (20)	2 (23)	3 (2)	3 (2)	11	10	10	9	8	14	13	13	13	17	16	13
Coaches	1 (22)	2 (20)	2 (18)	3 (2)	3 (2)	10	10	9	9	8	14	12	13	13	19	17	10
Harris	Not released					10	10	9	9	8	14	12	12	13	20	17	Not released
BCS	Not released								7	6	13	10	11	11	16	15	Not released

== Game summaries ==
=== Georgia Southern ===
	1	2	3	4	Total
Georgia Southern	0	0	7	14	21
#1 Georgia	10	14	14	7	45

Georgia won its season opener over Georgia Southern, 45–21. Georgia led 38–0 in the 3rd quarter before replacing many of its starting players. Knowshon Moreno scored 3 touchdowns on eight rushing attempts. Georgia lost its #1 ranking after the game and would never regain it, losing it after this game in part to USC's 52–7 win over Virginia and the perception that Georgia's defense was questionable for allowing three touchdowns to a lesser opponent.

A. J. Green recorded his first career touchdown on a 3-yard pass from back-up quarterback, Joe Cox.

=== Central Michigan ===
	1	2	3	4	Total
Central Michigan	0	7	10	0	17
#1 Georgia	7	21	14	14	56

Georgia coasted to a second straight victory to start the season, beating Central Michigan, 56–17. Knowshon Moreno had 3 touchdowns and 168 yards on 18 carries. Moreno had a 52-yard touchdown run and added a highlight reel leap over Central Michigan defender Vince Agnew on a 29-yard run. Matthew Stafford added two touchdown passes, including a 54-yard bomb to Mohammed Massaquoi. Demarcus Dobbs picked off a Central Michigan pass late in the second quarter and ran 79 yards for a defensive touchdown.

=== South Carolina ===
	1	2	3	4	Total
#2 Georgia	0	6	8	0	14
South Carolina	0	7	0	0	7

Georgia beat the South Carolina Gamecocks in a low-scoring game that was closer than many expected, finally prevailing 14–7. The young offensive line struggled with the South Carolina defense. Matthew Stafford completed 15 of 25 passes for 146 yards, but his biggest play came on a 30-yard 3rd quarter run to the South Carolina 4, setting up a Knowshon Moreno touchdown run on the next play. Moreno had 79 yards on 20 carries. A. J. Green led the Georgia receivers with 3 catches for 61 yards.

=== Arizona State ===
	1	2	3	4	Total
#3 Georgia	0	21	3	3	27
#24 Arizona State	0	3	7	0	10

Georgia scored three 2nd-quarter touchdowns to take a 21–3 lead at halftime against Arizona State. The 2nd half was rather uneventful, and Georgia rolled to an easy 27–10 win. Stafford had the most passing yards of his career (285), and A. J. Green had a breakout game with 159 yards on 8 catches. Moreno also added 2 touchdowns and 149 yards rushing on 23 carries. A. J. Green was named SEC Freshman of the Week for his performance.

=== Alabama ===
	1	2	3	4	Total
#10 Alabama	10	21	0	10	41
#3 Georgia	0	0	10	20	30

ESPN's College Gameday broadcast their show live from Athens before the Alabama game. The visit was the show's first broadcast from Athens since the Tennessee game in 1998. A. J. Green led all Georgia receivers with 6 catches for 88 yards and a touchdown. This game was notable in that it was only the third ever "blackout" game where the team donned black jerseys and the majority of the fans wore black. However, unlike earlier two contests which were both big Georgia wins, the Crimson Tide dominated early in the game and built an insurmountable 31–0 halftime lead from which Georgia was unable to recover. After the disappointment of this game, the bulldogs would never have another blackout game until 2016 where they faced against Louisiana-Lafayette.

=== Tennessee ===
	1	2	3	4	Total
Tennessee	0	7	7	0	14
#10 Georgia	10	10	0	6	26

Georgia ended a 2-game losing streak to Tennessee with a 26–14 win in Athens. Stafford had 310 yards passing in his first career 300-yard passing game. A 28-yard field goal by Blair Walsh capped off a 17 play, fourth quarter drive that ran 10 minutes and 55 seconds off the clock. The drive was the longest by an SEC team since LSU had an 11-minute, 2 second drive against Arizona State in 2005.

=== Vanderbilt ===
	1	2	3	4	Total
#23 Vanderbilt	0	7	7	0	14
#9 Georgia	7	7	7	3	24

Georgia beat the #23-ranked Vanderbilt Commodores, 24–14, on homecoming weekend. Knowshon Moreno had a season high 172 yards and 1 touchdown on 23 carries, and A. J. Green had 7 catches for 132 yards and 1 touchdown.

=== LSU ===
#9 Georgia at #11 LSU

Team	1	2	3	4	Total
• Georgia	14	10	14	14	52
LSU	7	10	7	14	38

- Date: October 25
- Location: Tiger Stadium, Baton Rouge, Louisiana
- Game start: 3:30 p.m. EST
- TV announcers (CBS): Verne Lundquist & Gary Danielson

Scoring summary
1	14:40	UGA	Darryl Gamble 40-yard interception return (Blair Walsh kick)	UGA 7-0
1	9:41	LSU	Brandon LaFell 10-yard pass from Jarrett Lee (Colt David kick)	Tied 7-7
1	3:10	UGA	Fred Munzenmaier 1-yard run (Blair Walsh kick)	UGA 14-7
2	14:55	UGA	Kenneth Harris 5-yard pass from Matthew Stafford (Blair Walsh kick)	UGA 21-7
2	11:37	LSU	Colt David 51-yard field goal	UGA 21-10
2	7:23	LSU	Charles Scott 2-yard run (Colt David kick)	UGA 21-17
2	1:36	UGA	Blair Walsh 50-yard field goal	UGA 24-17
3	8:21	UGA	A. J. Green 49-yard pass from Matthew Stafford (Blair Walsh kick)	UGA 31-17
3	3:55	UGA	Knowshon Moreno 68-yard run (Blair Walsh kick)	UGA 38-17
4	10:49	UGA	Matthew Stafford 7-yard run (Blair Walsh kick)	UGA 45-17
4	8:47	LSU	Keiland Williams 6-yard pass from Jarrett Lee (Colt David kick)	UGA 45-24
4	3:18	UGA	Darryl Gamble 53-yard interception return (Blair Walsh kick)	UGA 52-24
4	2:27	LSU	Brandon LaFell 43-yard pass from Jarrett Lee (Colt David kick)	UGA 52-31

Georgia beat the #11-ranked LSU Tigers, 52–38, in Tiger Stadium. Stafford was 17 of 26 passing for 249 yards and 2 touchdowns. He also added 1 rushing touchdown. Knowshon Moreno rushed 21 times for 163 yards and 1 touchdown on a 68-yard 3rd quarter run. Linebacker Darryl Gamble, starting at middle linebacker position for the injured Dannell Ellerbe, twice intercepted LSU quarterback, Jarrett Lee, for touchdown returns of 40 and 53 yards. A. J. Green had 3 receptions for 89 yards, including a 49-yard 3rd-quarter touchdown.

=== Florida ===
The 2008 Georgia–Florida game, which Georgia lost 49–10.

	1	2	3	4	Total
#8 Georgia	0	3	0	7	10
#7 Florida	7	7	21	14	49

Florida routed Georgia, 49–10, in one of the most heavily hyped Florida–Georgia football rivalry games ever. Stafford struggled, going 18 of 33 for 265 yards passing with 0 touchdowns and 3 interceptions. The loss was the largest margin of defeat in Mark Richt's 8-year head coaching career.

=== Kentucky ===
	1	2	3	4	Total
#14 Georgia	14	7	7	14	42
Kentucky	7	7	10	14	38

Georgia beat Kentucky, 42–38, after Matthew Stafford threw an 11-yard touchdown pass to A. J. Green with 1:54 left in the 4th quarter. Demarcus Dobbs then intercepted a last minute pass from Kentucky quarterback Randall Cobb to preserve the win for Georgia. Stafford had a career-high 376 yards passing and 3 touchdowns. Mohammed Massaquoi also had a career-high 191 receiving yards with 8 receptions and 1 touchdown.

=== Auburn ===
	1	2	3	4	Total
#12 Georgia	0	7	3	7	17
Auburn	6	0	0	7	13

Matthew Stafford threw a 17-yard, 4th-quarter touchdown pass to A. J. Green, and the Bulldogs stopped a late Auburn drive to win 17–13. The win marked Georgia's 3rd straight win against Auburn for the first time since winning 3 straight against Auburn from 1980 to 1982.

=== Georgia Tech ===
	1	2	3	4	Total
#23 Georgia Tech	12	0	23	10	45
#13 Georgia	14	14	0	14	42

A disappointing regular season for Georgia ended with an upset loss to bitter rival Georgia Tech, snapping Georgia's 7-game winning streak in the series. Georgia had a 28–12 halftime lead but Georgia Tech outscored Georgia 23–0 in the third quarter. Matthew Stafford led the Dawgs with a career-high of 407 yds passing and 5 tds. 3 of those went to Mohamed Massaquoi.

=== Capital One Bowl ===
	1	2	3	4	Total
#15 Georgia	3	0	14	7	24
#18 Michigan State	3	3	0	6	12

The final game of the season would prove to be the Capital One Bowl in Orlando, Florida against Michigan State. It would be Matthew Stafford's and Knowshon Moreno's last game at UGA. Stafford threw three touchdown passes in the 2nd half of game. The final touchdown of the game was caught by Knowshon Moreno cementing the win for Georgia in this bowl game.

== Statistics ==
=== Team ===
	Team	Opp
Scoring		
Points per game		
First downs		
Rushing		
Passing		
Penalty		
Total offense		
Avg per play		
Avg per game		
Fumbles-Lost		
Penalties-Yards		
Avg per game		

	Team	Opp
Punts-Yards		
Avg per punt		
Time of possession/Game		
3rd down conversions		
4th down conversions		
Touchdowns scored		
Field goals-Attempts-Long		
PAT-Attempts		
Attendance		
Games/Avg per Game		

==== Scores by quarter ====
	1	2	3	4	Total
Georgia	79	120	94	116	409
Opponents	52	79	99	89	319

=== Offense ===
==== Rushing ====
Name	GP-GS	Att	Gain	Loss	Net	Avg	TD	Long	Avg/G
Knowshon Moreno	13	250	1463	63	1400	5.6	16	68	107.7
Caleb King	11	61	278	31	247	4.0	1	27	22.5
Richard Samuel	11	26	137	4	133	5.1	1	27	12.1
Total	11.7	337	1878	98	1780	5.3	18	40.6	47.4
Opponents									

==== Passing ====
Name	GP-GS	Effic	Att-Cmp-Int	Pct	Yds	TD	Lng	Avg/G
Matthew Stafford	13		383-235-10	61.4	3459	25	78	
Joe Cox			15-11-0	73.3	151	2	21	
Total								
Opponents								

==== Receiving ====
Name	GP-GS	No.	Yds	Avg	TD	Long	Avg/G
A.J. Green	13	8	963	17.2	8	54	74
Mohammed Massaquoi	13	1	920	15.9	8	78	70.8
Michael Moore	13	82	451	15.6	2	46	34.7
Knowshon Moreno	13	24	392	11.8	2	37	30.2
Kris Durham	5	16	199	15.3	1	61	39.8
Demiko Goodman	13	85	133	12.1	1	21	10.3
Kenneth Harris	13	88	116	10.5	1	31	8.9
Aron White	13	81	88	29.3	2	48	6.8
Total							
Opponents							

=== Defense ===
Name	GP	Tackles				Sacks	Pass defense		Interceptions				Fumbles		Blkd Kick
Name	GP	Solo	Ast	Total	TFL-Yds	No-Yds	BrUp	QBH	No.-Yds	Avg	TD	Long	Rcv-Yds	FF	Blkd Kick
Total															

=== Special teams ===
Name	Punting								Kickoffs				
Name	No.	Yds	Avg	Long	TB	FC	I20	Blkd	No.	Yds	Avg	TB	OB
Total													

Name	Punt returns					Kick returns				
Name	No.	Yds	Avg	TD	Long	No.	Yds	Avg	TD	Long
Total										

== Players ==
Head Coach Mark Richt dismissed two players on October 8, 2008. Donavan Baldwin, a safety, and Walter Hill, a wide receiver were removed from the team.

2008 Georgia Bulldogs by Position
Quarterbacks: 6 Logan Gray – (redshirt) Freshman; 11 Edward Dent – Freshman; 7 Matthew Stafford – Junior; 14 Joe Cox – (redshirt) Junior; 15 Jonathan Batson – (redshirt) Sophomore; 17 Jonathan deLaureal – (redshirt) Sophomore; Running Backs: 4 Caleb King – (redshirt) Freshman; 22 Richard Samuel – Freshman; 24 Knowshon Moreno – (redshirt) Sophomore; 27 Dontavius Jackson – Freshman; 30 Carlton Thomas – Freshman; 25 Josh Cox – Freshman; 37 Cortney Newmans – (redshirt) Freshman; 45 Josh Bagby – (redshirt) Junior; Fullbacks: 15 Benjamin Boyd – Senior; 36 Brannan Southerland – Senior; 43 Kevin Lanier – Freshman; 44 Josh Sailors – (redshirt) Freshman; 46 Justin Fields – (redshirt) Sophomore; 48 Fred Munzenmaier – (redshirt) Sophomore; 49 Shaun Chapas – (redshirt) Sophomore; 42 Cedric Lang – (redshirt) Freshman; Wide Receivers: 1 Mohamed Massaquoi – Senior; 3 Taylor Bradberry – Freshman; 5 Craig Sager – (redshirt) Sophomore; 8 A. J. Green – Freshman; 10 Zach Renner – (redshirt) Freshman; 12 Tavarres King – Freshman; 16 Kris Durham – Junior; 20 Marquise Brown – (redshirt) Sophomore; 23 Twoey Hosch – Freshman; 26 Tony Wilson – (redshirt) Sophomore; 28 Israel Troupe – (redshirt) Freshman; ~~80 Walter Hill – (redshirt) Freshman~~; 82 Michael Moore – Junior; 83 Cornelius Washington – Freshman; 85 Demiko Goodman – Senior; 87 Veron Spellman – Junior; 88 Kenneth Harris – Senior	Tight Ends: 39 Dustin Banks – Freshman; 47 Trenton Turner – Freshman; 58 Casey Nickels – (redshirt) Sophomore; 75 Kiante Tripp – (redshirt) Sophomore; 81 Aron White – (redshirt) Freshman; 83 Richard Lowe – Freshman; 84 Bryce Ros – Freshman; 86 Tripp Chandler – Senior'; 89 Bruce Figgins – Sophomore; Offensive Line: 18 Derek Rich – (redshirt) Sophomore; 54 Tanner Strickland – (redshirt) Freshman; 60 Clint Boling – Sophomore; 61 Ben Jones – Freshman; 63 Chris Davis – (redshirt) Sophomore; 67 Jonathan Owens – Junior; 68 Ben Harbin – Freshman; 71 Cordy Glenn – Freshman; 72 Vince Vance – Junior; 73 Chris Little – (redshirt) Freshman; 74 Kevin Perez – (redshirt) Sophomore; 76 Ben Harden – (redshirt) Freshman; 77 Trinton Sturdivant – Sophomore; 78 Josh Davis – (redshirt) Sophomore; 79 Justin Anderson – (redshirt) Freshman	Defensive Line: 41 Roderick Battle – Junior; 42 Justin Houston – (redshirt) Freshman; 53 Jeremy Longo – Freshman; 55 Jeremy Lomax – Senior; 56 Geno Atkins – Junior; 58 Demarcus Dobbs – (redshirt) Sophomore; 64 Matthew DeGenova – (redshirt) Freshman; 66 Brandon Wheeling – Junior; 68 Wes Jacobs – Senior; 69 Andrew Gully – Senior; 90 Corvey Irvin – Senior; 91 Kade Weston – Junior; 92 Neland Ball – (redshirt) Freshman; 93 A.J. Harmon – Freshman; 94 DeAngelo Tyson – Freshman; 95 Jeff Owens – Senior; 97 Brandon Wood – (redshirt) Sophomore; 98 Ricardo Crawford – (redshirt) Sophomore; 99 Jarius Wynn – Senior; Linebackers: 33 Dannell Ellerbe – Senior; 35 Rennie Curran – Sophomore; 37 Akeem Hebron – (redshirt) Sophomore; 38 Marcus Dowtin – Freshman; 43 Charles White – (redshirt) Freshman; 44 Marcus Washington – Senior; 45 Christian Robinson – Freshman; 50 Darryl Gamble – (redshirt) Sophomore; 51 Akeem Dent – (redshirt) Sophomore; 52 Darius Dewberry – Junior; 65 Devin Hollander – Junior; Defensive Backs: 18 Bacarri Rambo – Freshman; 19 Sanders Commings – Freshman; 25 Vance Cuff – Sophomore; 29 Makiri Pugh – Freshman; 30 Eric Elliot – (redshirt) Freshman; 39 Nick Williams – Freshman; 43 Stephen Braue – (redshirt) Junior	Cornerbacks: 2 Asher Allen – Junior; 3 Bryan Evans – Junior; 11 Ramarcus Brown – Senior; 16 Chad Gloer – (redshirt) Sophomore; 20 Brandon Boykin – Freshman; 23 Prince Miller – Junior; 26 Christian Norton – (redshirt) Sophomore; Safeties: 5 CJ Byrd – Senior; 6 Andrew Johnson – (redshirt) Sophomore; 9 Reshad Jones – (redshirt) Sophomore; 31 Quintin Banks – (redshirt) Sophomore; 44 John Knox – (redshirt) Freshman; 47 Andrew Williams – Senior; Punters: 13 Drew Butler – (redshirt) Freshman; 32 Brian Mimbs – Senior; 98 Trent Dittmer – Sophomore; Kickers: 57 Blair Walsh – Freshman; 95 Jordan Stowe – Freshman; 96 Andrew Jensen – (redshirt) Junior; 99 Jamie Lindley – Freshman; Long snappers: 59 Bo Fowler – Senior; 94 Billy Johnson – Freshman; 95 Ty Frix – Freshman
