= Brice Hunter =

American football player (1974–2004)

No. 19, 88
- Position: Wide receiver

Personal information
- Born: April 21, 1974; Coconut Creek, Florida, U.S.
- Died: April 18, 2004 (aged 29); Chicago, Illinois, U.S.
- Listed height: 6 ft 2 in (1.88 m)
- Listed weight: 206 lb (93 kg)

Career information
- High school: Valdosta (Valdosta, Georgia)
- College: Georgia
- NFL draft: 1996: 7th round, 251st overall pick

Career history
- Miami Dolphins (1996)*; San Francisco 49ers (1996)*; Tampa Bay Buccaneers (1996–1998)
- * Offseason or practice squad member only

Awards and highlights
- First-team All-SEC (1993); Second-team All-SEC (1994)

Career NFL statistics
- Receptions: 4
- Receiving yards: 73
- Receiving touchdowns: 1
- Stats at Pro Football Reference

Brice H. Hunter (April 21, 1974 – April 18, 2004) was an American professional football player who was a wide receiver in the National Football League (NFL). He was selected by the Miami Dolphins in the seventh round of the 1996 NFL draft with the 251st overall pick. He played college football for the Georgia Bulldogs.

== Death ==
Hunter was shot and killed outside of his Chicago apartment in 2004. The shooter, Thomas Williams, killed Hunter in self-defense during a fight over Williams's loud music. However, Williams did face a misdemeanor charge for failing to register his weapon.

== See also ==
- List of homicides in Illinois
