= Darryl Gamble =

American football player (born 1987)

No. 53, 49
- Position: Linebacker

Personal information
- Born: November 17, 1987 (age 38); Rochester, NY
- Listed height: 6 ft 2 in (1.88 m)
- Listed weight: 255 lb (116 kg)

Career information
- College: Georgia
- NFL draft: 2011: undrafted

Career history
- San Diego Chargers (2011); Washington Redskins (2012)*
- * Offseason or practice squad member only
- Stats at Pro Football Reference

Darryl Gamble (born November 17, 1987) is an American former football linebacker. He was signed by the San Diego Chargers as an undrafted free agent in 2011. He played college football at the University of Georgia.

== Professional career ==
=== San Diego Chargers ===
Gamble was signed by the San Diego Chargers on July 26, 2011. He had an impressive pre-season debut for the team on August 11, against the Seattle Seahawks. He recorded eight tackles, two of them being for a loss, and had one sack. Gamble was promoted to the active roster on December 20, 2011.

He was cut by the Chargers on August 31, 2012 for final cuts before the start of the 2012 season.

=== Washington Redskins ===
On September 3, 2012, Gamble was signed to the practice squad of the Washington Redskins. He was released on November 28.
