= Hason Graham =

American football player (born 1971)

Profile
- Position: Wide receiver

Personal information
- Born: March 21, 1971; Decatur, Georgia, U.S.

Career information
- College: Georgia
- NFL draft: 1995: undrafted

Career history
- 1995–1996: New England Patriots
- 1998: New York Jets*
- 1999: Nashville Kats
- * Offseason or practice squad member only

Awards and highlights
- Second-team All-SEC (1994)
- Stats at Pro Football Reference

Hason Aaron Graham (born March 21, 1971) is an American former professional football player who was a wide receiver and kick returner in the National Football League (NFL). He played in 19 games in the NFL during 1995 and 1996 seasons with the New England Patriots. He played college football for the Georgia Bulldogs.

With the Patriots, Graham appeared in 19 games, including a start during his rookie year. He caught 15 passes for 220 yards and 2 touchdowns.
