= 2012 Georgia Bulldogs football team =

American college football season

2012 Georgia Bulldogs football

SEC Eastern Division co-champion Capital One Bowl champion

SEC Championship Game, L 28–32 vs. Alabama

Capital One Bowl, W 45–31 vs. Nebraska
- Conference: Southeastern Conference
- Eastern Division

Ranking
- Coaches: No. 4
- AP: No. 5
- Record: 12–2 (7–1 SEC)
- Head coach: Mark Richt (12th season)
- Offensive coordinator: Mike Bobo (6th season)
- Offensive scheme: Pro-style
- Defensive coordinator: Todd Grantham (3rd season)
- Base defense: 3–4
- Home stadium: Sanford Stadium

2012 Southeastern Conference football standings
	Conf.			Overall
Team	W		L	W		L
Eastern Division
No. T–5 Georgia xy	7	–	1	12	–	2
No. 9 Florida x%	7	–	1	11	–	2
No. 8 South Carolina	6	–	2	11	–	2
No. 23 Vanderbilt	5	–	3	9	–	4
Missouri	2	–	6	5	–	7
Tennessee	1	–	7	5	–	7
Kentucky	0	–	8	2	–	10
Western Division
No. 1 Alabama x$#	7	–	1	13	–	1
No. 14 LSU *	6	–	2	10	–	3
No. T–5 Texas A&M	6	–	2	11	–	2
Mississippi State	4	–	4	8	–	5
Ole Miss *	3	–	5	7	–	6
Arkansas	2	–	6	4	–	8
Auburn	0	–	8	3	–	9
Championship: Alabama 32, Georgia 28
# – BCS National Champion; $ – BCS representative as conference champion; % – BCS at-large representative; x – Division champion/co-champions; y – Championship game participant; * Ole Miss and LSU vacated all wins due to NCAA violations.; Rankings from AP Poll

The 2012 Georgia Bulldogs football team represented the University of Georgia in the 2012 NCAA Division I FBS football season. The Bulldogs were led by 12th-year head coach Mark Richt and played their home games at Sanford Stadium. They were a member of the Eastern Division of the Southeastern Conference (SEC). They finished the season 12–2 overall and 7–1 in SEC play, claiming the East Division championship. They represented the division in the SEC Championship Game, where they lost to Alabama. They were invited to the Capital One Bowl, where they defeated Nebraska. The season included a sweep of three of Georgia's biggest SEC rivals (Florida, Auburn, and Tennessee) for just the fourth time at that point (1980, 1981 and 2011).

== Schedule ==
Date	Time	Opponent	Rank	Site	TV	Result	Attendance
September 1	12:20 p.m.	Buffalo*	No. 6	Sanford Stadium; Athens, GA	SECN	W 45–23	92,446
September 8	7:45 p.m.	at Missouri	No. 7	Faurot Field; Columbia, MO	ESPN2	W 41–20	71,004
September 15	7:30 p.m.	Florida Atlantic*	No. 7	Sanford Stadium; Athens, GA	CSS	W 56–20	92,746
September 22	7:45 p.m.	Vanderbilt	No. 5	Sanford Stadium; Athens, GA (rivalry)	ESPN2	W 48–3	92,746
September 29	3:30 p.m.	Tennessee	No. 5	Sanford Stadium; Athens, GA (rivalry)	CBS	W 51–44	92,746
October 6	7:00 p.m.	at No. 6 South Carolina	No. 5	Williams–Brice Stadium; Columbia, SC (rivalry, College GameDay)	ESPN	L 7–35	85,199
October 20	7:00 p.m.	at Kentucky	No. 13	Commonwealth Stadium; Lexington, KY	SECRN	W 29–24	66,293
October 27	3:30 p.m.	vs. No. 3 Florida	No. 12	EverBank Field; Jacksonville, FL (rivalry)	CBS	W 17–9	84,681
November 3	3:30 p.m.	Ole Miss^{†}	No. 7	Sanford Stadium; Athens, GA	CBS	W 37–10	92,746
November 10	7:00 p.m.	at Auburn	No. 6	Jordan–Hare Stadium; Auburn, AL (Deep South's Oldest Rivalry)	ESPN2	W 38–0	86,764
November 17	3:30 p.m.	Georgia Southern*	No. 5	Sanford Stadium; Athens, GA	FSN	W 45–14	92,746
November 24	12:00 p.m.	Georgia Tech*	No. 3	Sanford Stadium; Athens, GA (Clean, Old-Fashioned Hate)	ESPN	W 42–10	92,746
December 1	4:00 p.m.	vs. No. 2 Alabama	No. 3	Georgia Dome; Atlanta, GA (SEC Championship Game, rivalry, College GameDay)	CBS	L 28–32	75,824
January 1, 2013	1:00 p.m.	vs. No. 23 Nebraska*	No. 6	Florida Citrus Bowl; Orlando, FL (Capital One Bowl)	ABC	W 45–31	59,712
*Non-conference game; ^{†}Homecoming; Rankings from AP Poll released prior to the game; All times are in Eastern time

== Game summaries ==
=== Buffalo ===
Team	1	2	3	4	Total
Buffalo	6	10	0	7	23
• #6 Georgia	14	10	7	14	45

- Location: Athens, Georgia
- Game start: 12:21 p.m.
- Elapsed time: 3:26
- Game attendance: 92,446
- Game weather: 86, Fair
- Referee: Penn Wagers
- TV announcers (SEC Network): Dave Neal (play-by-play), Andre Ware (color), Cara Capuano (sideline)

=== Missouri ===
Team	1	2	3	4	Total
• #7 Georgia	0	9	15	17	41
Missouri	0	10	10	0	20

- Location: Columbia, Missouri
- Game start: 6:50 p.m.
- Elapsed time: 3:48
- Game attendance: 71,004
- Game weather: 74, Sunny and Clear
- Referee: Tom Ritter
- TV announcers (ESPN2): Joe Tessitore (play-by-play), Matt Millen (color), Quint Kessenich (sideline)

=== Florida Atlantic ===
Team	1	2	3	4	Total
Florida Atlantic	7	7	0	6	20
• #7 Georgia	14	14	21	7	56

- Location: Athens, Georgia
- Game start: 7:35 p.m.
- Elapsed time: 3:15
- Game attendance: 92,746
- Game weather: 79, Partly Cloudy
- Referee: David Smith
- Television network: CSS

=== Vanderbilt ===
Team	1	2	3	4	Total
Vanderbilt	0	3	0	0	3
• #5 Georgia	13	14	21	0	48

- Location: Athens, Georgia
- Game start: 7:50 p.m.
- Elapsed time: 3:15
- Game attendance: 92,746
- Game weather: 82, Partly Cloudy
- Referee: Hubert Owens
- TV announcers (ESPN2): Mark Jones (play-by-play), Brock Huard (color), Shelley Smith (sideline)

=== Tennessee ===
Team	1	2	3	4	Total
Tennessee	10	20	7	7	44
• #5 Georgia	21	9	21	0	51

- Location: Athens, Georgia
- Game start: 3:39 p.m.
- Elapsed time: 3:51
- Game attendance: 92,746
- Game weather: 74, Mostly Cloudy
- Referee: Tom Moore
- TV announcers (CBS): Verne Lundquist (play by play), Gary Danielson (color), Tracy Wolfson (sideline)

=== South Carolina ===
Team	1	2	3	4	Total
#5 Georgia	0	0	0	7	7
• #6 South Carolina	21	0	7	7	35

- Location: Columbia, South Carolina
- Game start: 7:10 p.m.
- Elapsed time: 3:13
- Game attendance: 85,199
- Game weather: 78, Clear
- Referee: Matt Austin
- TV announcers (ESPN): Brent Musburger (play-by-play), Kirk Herbstreit (color), Heather Cox (sideline)

=== Kentucky ===
Team	1	2	3	4	Total
• #13 Georgia	7	9	6	7	29
Kentucky	7	7	3	7	24

- Location: Lexington, Kentucky
- Game start: 7:08 p.m.
- Elapsed time: 3:20
- Game attendance: 54,553
- Game weather: 52, Cloudy
- Referee: Hubert Owens
- Television network: FSN

=== Florida ===
Florida-Georgia Football Rivalry

Team	1	2	3	4	Total
#3 Florida	0	6	0	3	9
• #10 Georgia	7	0	3	7	17

- Location: Jacksonville, Florida
- Game start: 3:40 p.m.
- Elapsed time: 3:43
- Game attendance: 84,644
- Game weather: 72, Cloudy w/ gusts
- Referee: Matt Moore
- TV announcers (CBS): Verne Lundquist (play-by-play), Gary Danielson (color), Tracy Wolfson (sideline)

Scoring summary
1	12:02	Georgia	Todd Gurley 10 yard run (Marshall Morgan kick)	Georgia 7–0
2	7:05	Florida	Caleb Sturgis 38 yard field goal	Georgia 7–3
2	2:43	Florida	Caleb Sturgis 22 yard field goal	Georgia 7–6
3	8:34	Georgia	Marshall Morgan 29 yard field goal	Georgia 10–6
4	9:41	Florida	Caleb Sturgis 50 yard field goal	Georgia 10–9
4	7:11	Georgia	Malcolm Mitchell 45 yard pass from Aaron Murray (Marshall Morgan kick)	Georgia 17–9

=== Ole Miss ===
Team	1	2	3	4	Total
Ole Miss	3	7	0	0	10
• #6 Georgia	0	14	16	7	37

- Location: Athens, Georgia
- Game start: 3:39 p.m.
- Elapsed time: 3:19
- Game attendance: 92,746
- Game weather: 78, Sunny
- Referee: Ken Williamson
- TV announcers (CBS): Tim Brando (play-by-play), Steve Beuerlein (color)

=== Auburn ===
Deep South's Oldest Rivalry

Team	1	2	3	4	Total
• #5 Georgia	14	14	10	0	38
Auburn	0	0	0	0	0

- Location: Auburn, Alabama
- Game start: 6:06 p.m.
- Elapsed time: 2:59
- Game attendance: 86,146
- Game weather: 62, Clear
- Referee: Matt Austin
- TV announcers (ESPN2): Mark Jones (play-by-play), Brock Huard (color), Shelley Smith (sideline)

Scoring summary
1	10:51	UGA	Chris Conley 6 yard pass from Aaron Murray (Marshall Morgan kick)	Georgia 7–0
1	1:19	UGA	Malcolm Mitchell 5 yard pass from Aaron Murray (Marshall Morgan kick)	Georgia 14–0
2	10:27	UGA	Tavarres King 17 yard pass from Aaron Murray (Marshall Morgan kick)	Georgia 21–0
2	5:09	UGA	Todd Gurley 6 yard run (Marshall Morgan kick)	Georgia 28–0
3	8:18	UGA	Marshall Morgan 20 yard field goal	Georgia 31–0
3	4:34	UGA	Keith Marshall 62 yard run (Marshall Morgan kick)	Georgia 38–0

=== Georgia Southern ===
Team	1	2	3	4	Total
Georgia Southern	0	7	0	7	14
• #5 Georgia	7	10	21	7	45

- Location: Athens, Georgia
- Game start: 1:35 p.m.
- Elapsed time: 3:12
- Game attendance: 92,746
- Game weather: 57, Sunny
- Referee: Marc Curles
- Television network: PPV, WSB-TV

=== Georgia Tech ===
Clean, Old Fashioned Hate

Team	1	2	3	4	Total
Georgia Tech	3	0	0	7	10
• #3 Georgia	14	14	14	0	42

- Location: Athens, Georgia
- Game start: 12:01 p.m.
- Elapsed time: 3:12
- Game attendance: 92,746
- Game weather: 52, Clear
- Referee: Tom Zimorski
- Television network: ESPN

=== Alabama ===
SEC Championship Game

Team	1	2	3	4	Total
• #2 Alabama	0	10	8	14	32
#3 Georgia	0	7	14	7	28

- Location: Atlanta, Georgia
- Game start: 4:11 p.m.
- Elapsed time: 3:42
- Game attendance: 75,624
- Game weather: Indoors
- Referee: Tom Ritter
- TV announcers (CBS/CTSN): Verne Lundquist (play-by-play), Gary Danielson (color), Tracy Wolfson (sideline reporter) Eli Gold (play-by-play), Phil Savage (color), Chris Stewart (sideline reporter)

=== Nebraska ===
Capital One Bowl

Team	1	2	3	4	Total
• #6 Georgia	16	7	8	14	45
#23 Nebraska	14	10	7	0	31

- Location: Orlando, Florida
- Game start: 1:08 p.m.
- Elapsed time: 3:33
- Game attendance: 59,712
- Game weather: 75, Partly Cloudy
- Referee: Mike Defee
- TV announcers (ABC): Rece Davis (play-by-play), David Pollack and Jesse Palmer (color), Samantha Ponder (sideline)

== Rankings ==
Ranking movements Legend: ██ Increase in ranking ██ Decrease in ranking т = Tied with team above or below ( ) = First-place votes
	Week															
Poll	Pre	1	2	3	4	5	6	7	8	9	10	11	12	13	14	Final
AP	6	7	7	5	5	5	14	13	12	7	5т	5	3	3	5	5т
Coaches	6	7	7	6	5	5	12	12	11	6	5	4	3 (1)	3 (1)	6	4
Harris	Not released						11	12	11	6	5	5	3	3	6	Not released
BCS	Not released							11	10	6	5	5	3	3	7	Not released
