= Andy Fuller =

American football player (born 1974)

No. 82
- Position: Tight end

Personal information
- Born: September 8, 1974 (age 52)
- Listed height: 6 ft 4 in (1.93 m)
- Listed weight: 295 lb (134 kg)

Career information
- High school: J. O. Johnson (Huntsville, Alabama, U.S.)
- College: Auburn
- NFL draft: 1996: undrafted

Career history
- Miami Dolphins (1996)*; Barcelona Dragons (1997); Mobile Admirals (1999); Tennessee Valley Vipers (2000–2005)
- * Offseason or practice squad member only

Andrien "Andy" Fuller (born September 8, 1974) is an American former professional gridiron football player who was a tight end, primarily for the arena football team Tennessee Valley Vipers of the AF2. He played college football at Auburn.

== Early life ==
Fuller attended J.O. Johnson High School in Huntsville, Alabama before signing to play at Auburn University. Fuller enjoyed success at Auburn, including being a member of the undefeated 1993 team and receiving first team All-SEC honors in 1994 and 1995. He is perhaps best known for his part in Auburn's upset versus No. 1 ranked Florida on October 15, 1994, where he had 7 receptions for 115 yards and a touchdown. During his career at Auburn (1992–1995), he caught 33 passes for 513 yards and five touchdowns.

== Professional career ==
Fuller entered the 1996 NFL draft but went undrafted and subsequently signed as an unrestricted free agent with the Miami Dolphins in April 1996. He was waived by the Dolphins later that year and spent the 1997 season with the Barcelona Dragons of NFL Europe, who were the World Bowl Champions after defeating Rhein Fire in World Bowl V. Fuller's next stop brought him back home to Alabama to spend the 1999 season with the Mobile Admirals of the Regional Football League.

In 2000, Fuller joined the Tennessee Valley Vipers of the Arena Football League's AF2, where he played five seasons and was a key offensive and defensive player in a five-year run that saw the club post a 63–17 record. Tennessee Valley won four straight division titles, made the playoffs each season, and competed in the ArenaCup finals in 2000. Fuller played in 73 games and caught 54 passes for 573 yards and 28 touchdowns on offense, and as a defensive lineman recorded 95 tackles, 14.5 tackles-for-loss of 53 yards, 15.5 sacks for 88 yards, two interceptions, eight pass break ups, nine forced fumbles and five fumble recoveries. These statistics have cemented his place in Tennessee Valley history, currently ranked third all-time in sacks and second in forced fumbles, prompting the franchise to retire Fuller's number (#82) on June 11, 2005.

On October 1, 2006, WHNT-TV announced Andy Fuller would co-host a weekly discussion with former Alabama tailback Chris Anderson showcasing upcoming Alabama/Auburn games.
