= Amarlo Herrera =

American football player (born 1991)

No. 49
- Position: Linebacker

Personal information
- Born: September 20, 1991 (age 35); Atlanta, Georgia, U.S.
- Listed height: 6 ft 0 in (1.83 m)
- Listed weight: 243 lb (110 kg)

Career information
- High school: North Clayton (College Park, Georgia)
- College: Georgia
- NFL draft: 2015: 6th round, 207th overall pick

Career history
- Indianapolis Colts (2015); Tennessee Titans (2016)*; Washington Redskins (2016)*
- * Offseason or practice squad member only

Awards and highlights
- Second-team All-SEC (2014)
- Stats at Pro Football Reference

Amarlo Herrera (born September 20, 1991) is an American former professional football player who was a linebacker for the Indianapolis Colts of the National Football League (NFL). He played college football for the Georgia Bulldogs, and was selected by the Colts in the sixth round of the 2015 NFL draft. He was also a member of the Tennessee Titans and Washington Redskins.

== College career ==
Herrera played at the University of Georgia from 2011 to 2014. During his career he started 43 of 54 games and recorded 334 tackles, 3.5 sacks and three interceptions.

== Professional career ==
=== Indianapolis Colts ===
Herrera was selected by the Indianapolis Colts in the sixth round (207th overall) of the 2015 NFL draft. He agreed to terms with the Colts on May 6. Herrera spent the first 5 weeks of the 2015 season on the practice squad, and was elevated to the 53-man roster for Week 6. He was waived on October 20, and signed to the practice squad the following day. On December 15, 2015, Herrera was waived by the Colts. He was re-signed on December 29. On August 10, 2016, Herrera was released by the Colts.

=== Tennessee Titans ===
On August 12, 2016, Herrera was claimed off waivers by the Tennessee Titans. On August 28, 2016, Herrera was waived by the Titans.

=== Washington Redskins ===
On September 19, 2016, Herrera was signed to the Washington Redskins' practice squad. He was released from the Redskins' practice squad on September 27, 2016.

=== WWE ===
On June 17, 2017, it was reported on wwe.com that Herrera had attended a tryout for the WWE.
