= Aaron Murray =

American football player (born 1990)

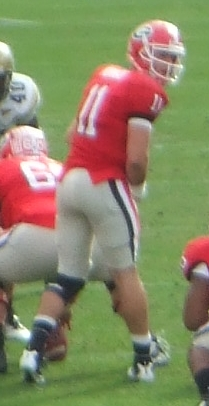
- Murray with Georgia in 2011

No. 7, 11
- Position: Quarterback

Personal information
- Born: November 10, 1990 (age 36); Tampa, Florida, U.S.
- Listed height: 6 ft 1 in (1.85 m)
- Listed weight: 207 lb (94 kg)

Career information
- High school: Henry B. Plant (Tampa)
- College: Georgia (2009–2013)
- NFL draft: 2014: 5th round, 163rd overall pick

Career history
- Kansas City Chiefs (2014–2015); Arizona Cardinals (2016)*; Philadelphia Eagles (2016)*; Los Angeles Rams (2017)*; Atlanta Legends (2019); Tampa Bay Vipers (2020)
- * Offseason or practice squad member only

Awards and highlights
- SEC Passing Touchdown Leader; SEC Career Passing Yards Leader; 2013 Capital One Bowl MVP; 2× Second-team All-SEC (2011, 2013); Coaches' 2010 Freshman All-SEC Team; 2012 CFN Third-team All American; 2010 Freshman All-American
- Stats at Pro Football Reference

Aaron William Murray (born November 10, 1990) is an American former football player. He was selected by the Kansas City Chiefs of the National Football League (NFL) in the fifth round of the 2014 NFL draft. He played college football for the Georgia Bulldogs. Murray currently leads the Southeastern Conference (SEC) career passing touchdown list, ahead of Peyton Manning, Eli Manning, and Matthew Stafford.

Murray is a college football color commentator for the ESPN networks, most permanently as a commentator for SEC Network. A two-year veteran of spring football, he began calling UFL games for ESPN in 2025.

== Early life ==
Murray was raised in Florida, the son of Lauren and Dennis Murray. His father is Catholic, and his mother is Jewish. He graduated from Plant High School after transferring from Jesuit High School in Tampa, Florida.

In 2008, the Plant High Panthers won 14 games in a row after a close opening day loss. The Panthers continued to the state championship, defeating Tallahassee Lincoln 34–14 en route to their 2nd title in three years.

As a junior, Murray completed 201-of-329 passing attempts for 4,012 yards and 51 touchdowns with seven interceptions. He had a longest pass play of 78 yards that season.

Murray received 53 scholarship offers, and during his senior season he completed 118-of-195 passes for 2,285 yards and 33 touchdowns with five interceptions. The senior rushed for 257 yards on 26 carries with two touchdowns. He participated in the 2009 U.S. Army All-American Bowl on the same East team with Clemson Tigers quarterback Tajh Boyd.

Murray was named Hillsborough co-offensive player of the year along with teammate and favorite target, wide receiver Orson Charles. Voted All-Suncoast First-team. He was also voted the 4A Player of the Year therefore making him a finalist and leading contender for Florida's Mr. Football of 2008. Murray was named Parade All-American, Orlando Sentinel's All-Southern Top 12 Players SE, Press-Register's Super Southeast 120 (#10), and FSWA All-State first-team quarterback.

== College career ==
Murray verbally committed to attend the University of Georgia under head coach Mark Richt in April 2008.

=== 2009 season ===
Murray redshirted during his freshman season because of a shoulder injury that he suffered during the fall. Georgia managed an 8–5 record and went 4–4 in the SEC under the leadership of senior quarterback Joe Cox.

=== 2010 season ===
With fellow freshman quarterback Zach Mettenberger being dismissed from the team for rules violations, Murray took over as Georgia's starting quarterback as a redshirt freshman. Georgia's top wide receiver A. J. Green received a four-game suspension from the NCAA for selling his jersey during the spring. Georgia began the season 1–4 and dropped four consecutive games, starting with a 17–6 road loss on September 4 to South Carolina and ending with an October 2 road trip to Colorado that resulted in a Buffaloes' 29–27 victory.

Georgia won five of their next six contests, including wins over Tennessee (41–14), Vanderbilt (43–0), and Kentucky (44–31). On October 9, Murray went 17-of-25 for 266 yards with two touchdowns and also rushed for 41 yards and two more touchdowns against the Volunteers. On October 16, Murray went 15-of-24 passing for 287 yards with two touchdowns against Vanderbilt. He also rushed six times for 36 yards against the Commodores. At Lexington, Kentucky, on October 23, Murray was 9-of-12, passing the ball for 113 yards and scoring five touchdowns.

In the 34–31 overtime loss to the Florida Gators on October 30, the Gators went up 21–7 at the half. Georgia scored three touchdowns, including two Murray touchdown passes, that tied the score at 31–31. Murray finished the game 18-for-37 passing for 313 yards with three touchdowns. On November 13, he completed 15-of-28 passes for 273 yards with three touchdowns against Auburn in a 49–31 loss.

Georgia finished 6–6 in the regular season. Murray helped defeat Georgia Tech 42–34 on November 27. He went 15-of-19 passing the ball for 271 yards with three touchdown passes including a 66-yarder thrown to wide receiver Kris Durham in the first quarter. The team was invited to play in the Liberty Bowl in Memphis, Tennessee on December 31, 2010, against Central Florida.

In the 2010 season, Murray set a UGA freshman record with 3,049 passing yards in 13 games. This placed him second in the SEC with the most yards passing by a freshman. More records set or broken include his 3,216 total offensive yards as a freshman that was a school record and ranked as No. 2 in SEC history. Murray also tied D.J. Shockley (2005) by scoring 28 total touchdowns in a single season. His 24 passing touchdowns is tied for second in UGA history for a single season. Murray's pass efficiency rating of 154.48 ranked as No. 14 nationally and No. 4 in the SEC. He was listed as third highest in the SEC averaging 234.5 yards passing per contest. Murray was ranked No. 4 in total offense in the SEC with 274.4 yards a game.

=== 2011 season ===
Georgia began 2011 with an 0–2 start with losses to nationally ranked No. 5 Boise State and nationally ranked No. 12 South Carolina. Georgia lost 35–21 loss to the Boise State Broncos on September 4, while the 45–42 loss to the South Carolina Gamecocks a week later saw Murray go 19-for-29 passing for 248 yards and four touchdowns. Georgia then won 10 games in a row that brought them to a 10–2 record, a No. 12 ranking nationally by the Associated Press College Football Poll, and a first-place ranking in the SEC East that placed UGA in the SEC Championship Game on December 3 due to South Carolina losing to Auburn and Arkansas.

Murray accounted for four touchdowns in a 59–0 win over Coastal Carolina on September 17. Murray hit on 18-of-26 pass attempts for 188 yards against the Coastal Carolina Chanticleers. Georgia beat Mississippi 27–13 on September 24, while Murray connected on 17-of-26 passes for 268 yards and two touchdowns. Next, Murray threw two touchdown passes in Georgia's 24–10 win over Mississippi State on October 1. The October 8 game against Tennessee had Murray complete 15-of-25 passes for 227 yards. Georgia beat Vanderbilt in the next game 33–28 as Murray finished the contest with 22-of-38 passes for a career-high 326 yards and three touchdowns including a 75-yard pass to wide receiver Marlon Brown. Georgia fell behind 17–3 in the 2nd quarter but came back for a 24–20 victory over the Florida Gators on October 29. Murray was 15-of-34 for 169 yards and two fourth down touchdown passes.

In November, Georgia won all four games against New Mexico State, Auburn, Kentucky, and Georgia Tech. In the New Mexico State game on November 5, Murray completed 18-for-23 passes for 238 yards and five touchdowns including a 47-yarder to wide receiver Chris Conley and a 42-yarder to Brandon Boykin. Murray completed 14-of-18 passes for 224 yards and four touchdowns as the Bulldogs beat Auburn on November 12 by a score of 45–7. In the home game with the Kentucky Wildcats on November 19, Murray completed 16-of-29 passes for 162 yards, and that included a seven-yard touchdown pass thrown to Marlon Brown in the fourth quarter that helped Georgia win, 19–10. Against Georgia Tech on November 26, Murray completed 19-of-29 passes for 252 yards and four touchdowns as the Bulldogs won, 31–17. The victory completed the Bulldogs' 10-game winning streak.

In the SEC Championship game on December 3 and the Outback Bowl on January 2, Georgia was pitted against number 1 ranked LSU and 12th-ranked Michigan State. The Bulldogs got off to a 10–0 lead by the end of the first quarter and held a 10–7 lead at the half against the LSU Tigers. However, LSU won the contest, 42–10. Murray completed 16-of-40 passes for 163 yards and a touchdown in the loss. The last game of the season was played against 10–3 Michigan State in Tampa, Florida, in the Outback Bowl. Georgia gained a 16–0 lead early only to have the Spartans tie the score at 27–27 to send the game into overtime. Michigan State won the contest 33–30 in a third overtime. Murray completed 20-of-32 passes for 288 yards and two touchdowns in the overtime loss.

Following the completion of the regular season, Murray gained honors from The Associated Press on December 5, 2011, as it released its All-SEC football team listing him as the second-team quarterback.

=== 2012 season ===
On December 1, No. 3 ranked Georgia lost the SEC Championship Game against No. 2 ranked Alabama, 32–28. The game ended as a Murray pass was caught by Chris Conley, who was five yards short of the end zone as time expired. Murray was 18-of-33 for 265 yards passing and a touchdown in the contest. In the game, he broke Peyton Manning's career touchdown record which was 89. Georgia was invited to the Capital One Bowl to face the Nebraska Cornhuskers in Orlando, Florida, on January 1, 2013. Murray threw for 427 yards and five touchdowns in the game. Murray ended the game with a 24-yard touchdown pass to running back Keith Marshall and an 87-yard touchdown pass to Chris Conley in the fourth quarter. The Bulldogs finished at 12–2 and SEC Eastern Division Champions. It was Murray's best statistical season as he completed 249-of-386 passes for 3,893 yards with 36 touchdowns, 10 interceptions, and a pass efficiency rating of 174.82.

=== 2013 season ===
Georgia's season began on August 31 with Murray's 5th ranked Bulldogs being surprised in an upset loss to 8th ranked Clemson on the road, 38–35. Murray finished the contest 20-of-29 passing for 323 yards while scoring on a 1-yard touchdown run with 1:19 left to play. In Georgia's 41–30 win over the South Carolina Gamecocks on September 7, he went 17 of 23 passes for 309 yards with four touchdowns. Murray's final touchdown came in the form of an 85-yard toss to wide receiver Justin Scott-Wesley early in the 4th quarter. Next, the University of Georgia faced North Texas at home on September 21 as Murray went 22-of-30 throwing the ball for 408 yards and three touchdowns while also garnering 37 rushing yards in the process. In this game Murray also broke a school record by passing for a touchdown of 98 yards to Reggie Davis. This was also Murray's 100th career touchdown pass.

The Bulldogs managed to escape in their matchup with #6 LSU. Georgia won the contest 44–41 as Murray capped off the scoring by connecting with receiver Scott-Wesley on a 25-yard touchdown pass with 1:47 left in the final stanza. Murray threw for 298 yards and for 4 touchdowns in the victory. The Bulldogs traveled to Knoxville, Tennessee for a matchup with the Vols on October 5. Murray raced 57 yards off a scramble early in the 3rd quarter which a play later set up his teammate Brendan Douglas' 3-yard touchdown run giving the Bulldogs a 24–17 lead with 14:55 left in the 3rd quarter. Soon afterwards, Georgia defeated Tennessee 34–31 in overtime off a Marshall Morgan 42-yard field goal. Murray finished the contest going 19-of-35 for 196 passing yards and three touchdowns.

Georgia took on Missouri at home on October 12, 2013. Murray opened up the scoring with a 7-yard touchdown pass to Douglas, but Missouri took a 28–10 lead going into the locker-room. The Missouri Tigers held on to win, 41–26. Murray passed for 290 yards (25 completions in 45 attempts) and three touchdowns in the loss. Georgia faced Vanderbilt on October 19. Murray's two touchdown passes gave Georgia a 27–14 lead going into the fourth quarter, but Vanderbilt won 31–27. Murray finished with 114 yards off 16-of-28 passing attempts. His 7-yard pass completion to Arthur Lynch moved Murray past Peyton Manning to become the SEC's all-time leading passer.

Georgia opened up November with a couple of wins against Florida 23–20 and Appalachian State 45–6. Murray hit Gurley on a 75-yard touchdown pass early in the Florida game that gave UGA a 14–0 lead in the 1st quarter. Murray threw for 258 yards (18-of-23 passing) in the Florida game and had 281 yards passing against Appalachian State off 19-of-26 passing attempts. Against Appalachian State, Murray completed touchdown passes 114 and 115 to tie and break the all-time SEC career passing touchdown record previously set by Florida quarterback Danny Wuerffel in 1996. In a November 16 game against Auburn that saw multiple lead changes, Murray appeared to have won the contest off a five-yard touchdown run which happened with less than two minutes left in the game. However, the Tigers won the game 43–38. Murray threw for 415 yards (33 completions out of 49 passes) and two touchdowns in the loss.

On November 23, in a game against Kentucky at home, Murray opened up the game with four touchdowns while going 18-of-23 passing for 183 yards in the first half. He was hit by a defender with 2:17 left in the half that caused him to suffer a season-ending ACL injury. The Bulldogs finished the year at 8–5. Prior to the ACL injury, Murray surpassed 3,000 yards for the season. This made him the first SEC quarterback to pass for 3,000 yards per year in four seasons.

=== Statistics ===
Season	Passing							Rushing			
Season	Cmp	Att	Pct	Yds	TD	Int	Rtg	Att	Yds	Avg	TD
2009	Redshirted										
2010	209	342	61.1	3,049	24	8	154.5	87	167	1.9	4
2011	238	403	59.1	3,149	35	14	146.4	87	111	1.3	2
2012	249	386	64.5	3,893	36	10	174.8	59	−68	−1.2	3
2013	225	347	64.8	3,075	26	9	158.8	58	186	3.5	7
Totals	921	1,478	62.3	13,166	121	41	158.5	291	396	1.4	16

== Professional career ==
Pre-draft measurables
Height	Weight	Arm length	Hand span
6 ft 0 1/2 in (1.84 m)	207 lb (94 kg)	30 5/8 in (0.78 m)	9 1/8 in (0.23 m)
All values from NFL Combine

=== Kansas City Chiefs ===
Murray was selected by the Kansas City Chiefs in the fifth round (163rd overall) of the 2014 NFL draft. On September 3, 2016, Murray was released by the Chiefs.

=== Arizona Cardinals ===
On September 4, 2016, Murray was signed by the Arizona Cardinals to their practice squad. On September 12, Murray was released by the Cardinals.

=== Philadelphia Eagles ===
On September 13, 2016, Murray was signed by the Philadelphia Eagles to their practice squad reuniting him with former Chief offensive coordinator and Eagle head coach Doug Pederson.

=== Los Angeles Rams ===
On March 23, 2017, Murray was signed by the Los Angeles Rams. On May 11, Murray was waived by the Rams.

=== Atlanta Legends ===
In 2018, Murray signed with the Atlanta Legends of the Alliance of American Football for the 2019 season. Murray was protected by the Legends on November 27, 2018, for the 2019 AAF QB Draft, where he was selected second overall.

Murray began the 2019 AAF season as the backup to Matt Simms. In the fourth game against the Arizona Hotshots, Murray relieved an injured Simms in the first quarter and led the Legends to a 14–11 victory, the first win in team history; he completed 20 of 33 passes for 254 yards and led the team in rushing with 54 yards on seven carries. The league ceased operations in April 2019.

=== Tampa Bay Vipers ===
Murray was allocated as one of the "Tier 1" quarterbacks in the 2020 XFL draft on October 15, 2019, assigned to the Tampa Bay Vipers. Murray signed a contract with the team on November 4. In his debut game and only start for the Vipers, Murray completed 16-of-34 pass attempts for 231 yards with zero touchdowns and two interceptions. He suffered a foot injury and missed the Week 2 game. Taylor Cornelius started the final four games for the Vipers. He had his contract terminated when the league suspended operations on April 10, 2020.

== Personal life ==
Murray's older brother, Josh Murray, was a contestant in the 2014 season of The Bachelorette. Josh also played football at the University of Georgia, and was a minor league baseball player.

Murray began dating Fox reporter Kacie McDonnell in 2013, and got engaged to her in 2014. The engagement was called off the following year.

He married Sharon Stufken in 2019. They have two children.

== See also ==
- List of select Jewish football players
