= Tavarres King =

American football player (born 1990)

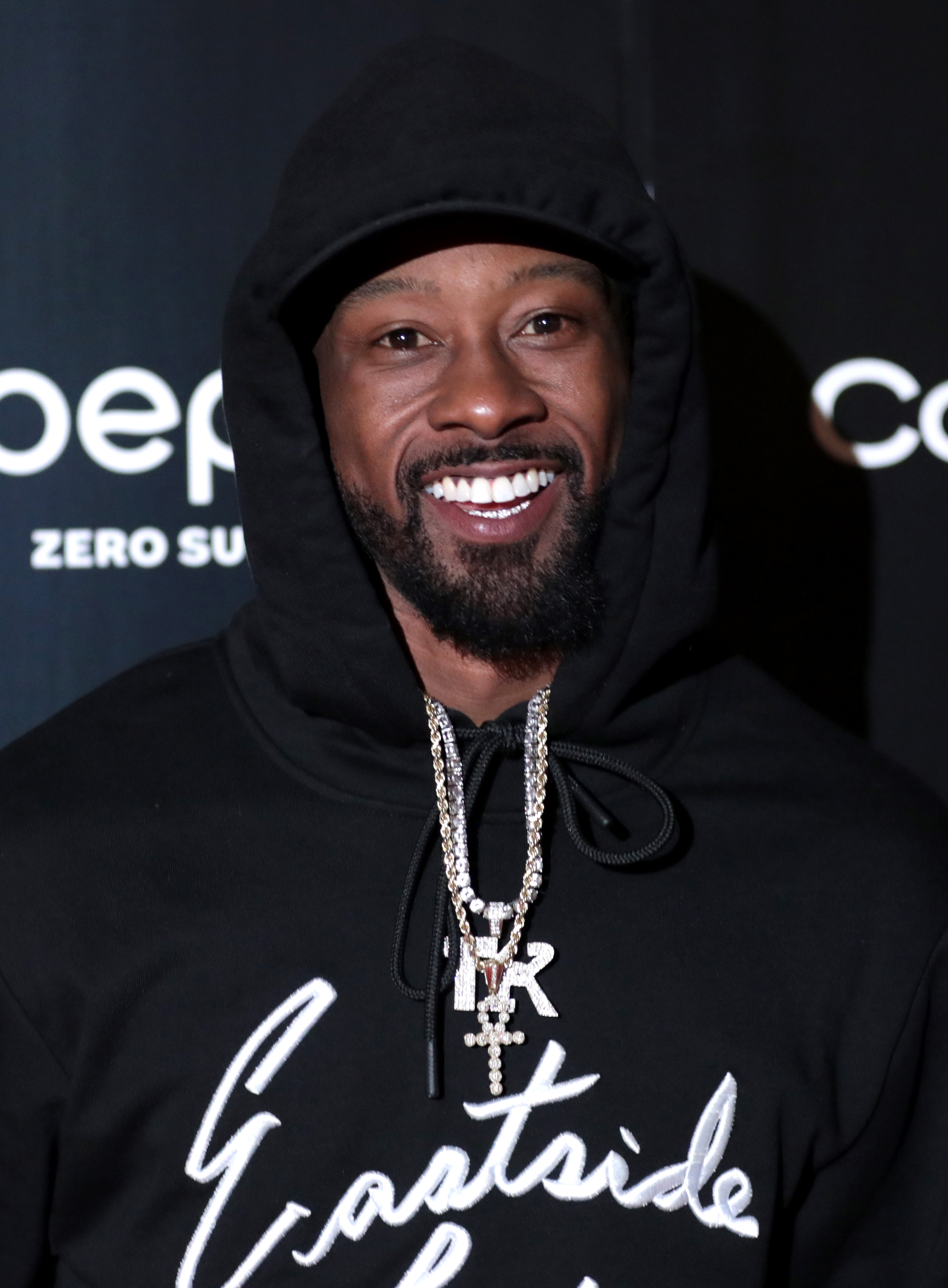
- King in 2023

No. 12, 15
- Position: Wide receiver

Personal information
- Born: July 14, 1990 (age 36); Mount Airy, Georgia, U.S.
- Listed height: 6 ft 1 in (1.85 m)
- Listed weight: 192 lb (87 kg)

Career information
- High school: Habersham Central (Mount Airy)
- College: Georgia (2008-2012)
- NFL draft: 2013: 5th round, 161st overall pick

Career history
- Denver Broncos (2013); Carolina Panthers (2013–2014); Jacksonville Jaguars (2014); Tampa Bay Buccaneers (2014); New York Giants (2015–2017); Minnesota Vikings (2018)

Career NFL statistics
- Receptions: 22
- Receiving yards: 303
- Receiving touchdowns: 3
- Stats at Pro Football Reference

Tavarres King (born July 14, 1990) is an American former professional football player who was a wide receiver in the National Football League (NFL). He played college football for the Georgia Bulldogs and was selected by the Denver Broncos in the fifth round of the 2013 NFL draft.

== Early life ==
King attended Habersham Central High School in Mount Airy, Georgia, alongside teammate Gabe Irby. He was the RISE Gatorade Georgia Football Player of the Year after finishing his senior season in 2007 with a state-record 1,632 receiving yards and 17 TDs on 99 receptions (16.5 average). He also set a then-school record with 42 catches for 700 yards and 10 touchdowns, and returned a kickoff and a punt for a score as a junior. He finished his career with 207 catches for 3,726 yards and 37 TDs. His father, Anthony King, once held all the rushing records at Habersham Central and later played at Clemson.

Considered a four-star recruit by Rivals.com, he was rated the No.15 wide receiver prospect in the nation. He accepted a scholarship from Georgia over offers from Clemson, Florida and Georgia Tech.

== College career ==
During his tenure at the University of Georgia from 2008 to 2012, he caught 135 passes for 2,602 receiving yards and 20 touchdowns.

== Professional career ==
Pre-draft measurables
Height	Weight	Arm length	Hand span	40-yard dash	10-yard split	20-yard split	20-yard shuttle	Three-cone drill	Vertical jump	Broad jump	Bench press
6 ft 0 1/4 in (1.84 m)	189 lb (86 kg)	33 in (0.84 m)	9 1/2 in (0.24 m)	4.47 s	1.57 s	2.53 s	4.33 s	6.91 s	36.5 in (0.93 m)	10 ft 3 in (3.12 m)	11 reps
All values from NFL Combine

=== Denver Broncos ===
King was selected by the Denver Broncos in the fifth round, 161st overall in the 2013 NFL draft.

=== Carolina Panthers ===
King was claimed by the Carolina Panthers on October 21, 2013, after being waived by the Denver Broncos. He was cut August 30, 2014, for final roster cuts before the start of the 2014 season. He was signed to the team's practice squad the next day.

=== Jacksonville Jaguars ===
On September 16, 2014, the Jacksonville Jaguars signed King off the Carolina Panthers practice squad to the club's 53-man roster. He was waived on October 25, 2014.

=== Tampa Bay Buccaneers ===
On October 28, 2014, days after being released by Jacksonville when they promoted Peyton Thompson to their active roster, Tampa Bay worked out several wide receivers and signed King to their practice squad. On September 4, 2015, King was released by the Bucs on the final cuts toward the 53-man roster.

=== New York Giants ===
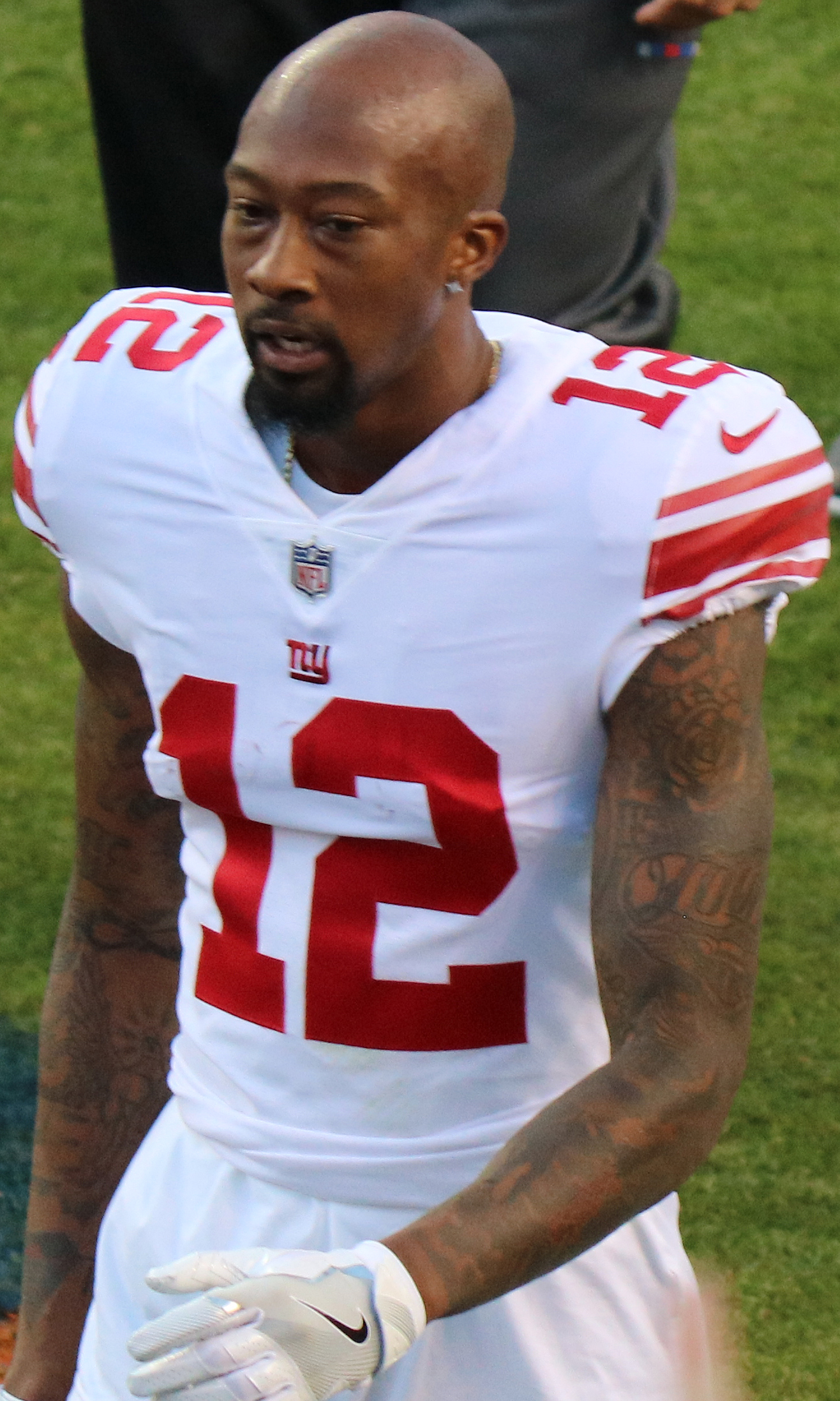
King with the New York Giants in 2017

On September 30, 2015, King was added to the practice squad of the New York Giants. On January 4, 2016, King signed a reserve/future contract with the Giants. On January 8, 2017, King scored a touchdown on a 41-yard pass from Eli Manning in the third quarter of the Giants' game against the Green Bay Packers at Lambeau Field in the Wild Card Round of the 2016-17 NFL playoffs. King's score made the game a 2-point game, but the Giants would eventually lose to the Packers 38–13. After the Giants signed wide receiver Brandon Marshall in the 2017 offseason, King changed his jersey number from #15 to #12.

On September 18, 2017, King was released by the Giants. He was re-signed on October 9, 2017, after injuries to multiple receivers on the team. He suffered a concussion in Week 15 and was placed on injured reserve on December 30, 2017, yet he still managed to rack up 240 receiving yards before his injury.

=== Minnesota Vikings ===
On April 5, 2018, King signed with the Minnesota Vikings. He was waived/injured on September 1, 2018, and was placed on injured reserve. He was released on October 9, 2018.

=== NFL statistics ===
Regular season
Year	Team	Games		Receiving					Rushing					Fumbles	
Year	Team	G	GS	Rec	Yds	Avg	Lng	TD	Att	Yds	Avg	Lng	TD	Fum	Lost
2014	TB	2	0	2	13	6.5	7	0	0	0	0.0	0	0	0	0
2016	NYG	7	0	2	50	25.0	44	0	0	0	0.0	0	0	0	0
2017	NYG	8	3	18	240	13.3	57	3	2	3	1.5	11	0	0	0
Career		17	3	22	303	13.8	57	3	2	3	1.5	11	0	0	0
