= 2007 Hawaii Warriors football team =

American college football season

2007 Hawaii Warriors football

WAC champion

Sugar Bowl, L 10–41 vs. Georgia
- Conference: Western Athletic Conference

Ranking
- Coaches: No. 17
- AP: No. 19
- Record: 12–1 (8–0 WAC)
- Head coach: June Jones (9th season)
- Offensive scheme: Run and shoot
- Defensive coordinator: Greg McMackin (2nd season)
- Base defense: 4–3
- Home stadium: Aloha Stadium

2007 Western Athletic Conference football standings
| | Conf. | | | Overall |
| Team | W | | L | W | | L |
|---|---|---|---|---|---|---|
| No. 19 Hawaii $ | 8 | – | 0 | 12 | – | 1 |
| Boise State | 7 | – | 1 | 10 | – | 3 |
| Fresno State | 6 | – | 2 | 9 | – | 4 |
| Nevada | 4 | – | 4 | 6 | – | 7 |
| Louisiana Tech | 4 | – | 4 | 5 | – | 7 |
| San Jose State | 4 | – | 4 | 5 | – | 7 |
| Utah State | 2 | – | 6 | 2 | – | 10 |
| New Mexico State | 1 | – | 7 | 4 | – | 9 |
| Idaho | 0 | – | 8 | 1 | – | 11 |
$ – Conference champion and BCS representative as top non-AQ school to meet automatic qualification criteria; Rankings from AP Poll

The 2007 Hawaii Warriors football team represented the University of Hawaii at Manoa in the 2007 NCAA Division I FBS football season.

The 2007 Warriors, led by record-setting senior quarterback Colt Brennan, carried a school-record 13-game winning streak, dating back to the end of the 2006 season, into the 2008 Sugar Bowl. The 2007 season marked the first undefeated regular season in school history, ending in defeat in the Sugar Bowl. The Warriors claimed their third-ever WAC championship in 2007 with a victory over defending conference champion Boise State. The championship was the school's first ever outright conference championship in football.

Brennan went on to set more career records in the FBS, and the Warriors became the third team outside the BCS conferences and second from the WAC to receive an invitation to play in the Bowl Championship Series, playing in the Sugar Bowl against the 4th ranked Georgia Bulldogs. However, they ultimately lost the game, 41–10.

On January 8, Jones left Hawaii to become the head coach for SMU Mustangs.

== Schedule ==
| Date | Time | Opponent | Rank | Site | TV | Result | Attendance | Source |
|---|---|---|---|---|---|---|---|---|
| September 1 | 6:05 p.m. | Northern Colorado* | No. 23 | Aloha Stadium; Halawa, HI | Oceanic PPV, KFVE* | W 63–6 | 40,252 | |
| September 8 | 1:00 p.m. | at Louisiana Tech | No. 20 | Joe Aillet Stadium; Ruston, LA | ESPN Plus, Oceanic PPV | W 45–44 ^{OT} | 22,135 | |
| September 15 | 3:30 p.m. | at UNLV* | No. 24 | Sam Boyd Stadium; Las Vegas, NV | The Mtn., Oceanic PPV | W 49–14 | 38,125 | |
| September 22 | 6:05 p.m. | Charleston Southern* | No. 19 | Aloha Stadium; Halawa, HI | Oceanic PPV, KFVE* | W 66–10 | 37,723 | |
| September 29 | 11:00 a.m. | at Idaho | No. 19 | Kibbie Dome; Moscow, ID | ESPN3, Oceanic PPV, KFVE* | W 48–20 | 13,807 | |
| October 6 | 6:05 p.m. | Utah State | No. 16 | Aloha Stadium; Halawa, HI | Oceanic PPV, KFVE* | W 52–37 | 36,360 | |
| October 12 | 2:00 p.m. | at San Jose State | No. 16 | Spartan Stadium; San Jose, CA (rivalry) | ESPN | W 42–35 ^{OT} | 20,473 | |
| October 27 | 6:05 p.m. | New Mexico State | No. 16 | Aloha Stadium; Halawa, HI | Oceanic PPV, KFVE* | W 50–13 | 41,218 | |
| November 10 | 6:00 p.m. | Fresno State | No. 14 | Aloha Stadium; Halawa, HI (rivalry) | ESPN2, Oceanic PPV, KFVE** | W 37–30 | 49,047 | |
| November 16 | 6:00 p.m. | at Nevada | No. 13 | Mackay Stadium; Reno, NV | ESPN2 | W 28–26 | 22,437 | |
| November 23 | 4:00 p.m. | No. 17 Boise State | No. 14 | Aloha Stadium; Halawa, HI | ESPN2 | W 39–27 | 50,000 | |
| December 1 | 6:30 p.m. | Washington* | No. 11 | Aloha Stadium; Halawa, HI | ESPN2 | W 35–28 | 50,000 | |
| January 1, 2008 | 3:30 p.m. | vs. No. 4 Georgia* | No. 10 | Louisiana Superdome; New Orleans, LA (Sugar Bowl) | Fox | L 10–41 | 74,383 | |
*Non-conference game; Rankings from AP Poll released prior to the game; All times are in Hawaii–Aleutian time

*Delayed broadcast on KFVE
**Simulcasted on KFVE

== Rankings ==
Ranking movements Legend: ██ Increase in ranking ██ Decrease in ranking
| | Week | | | | | | | | | | | | | | | |
| Poll | Pre | 1 | 2 | 3 | 4 | 5 | 6 | 7 | 8 | 9 | 10 | 11 | 12 | 13 | 14 | Final |
|---|---|---|---|---|---|---|---|---|---|---|---|---|---|---|---|---|
| AP | 23 | 20 | 24 | 19 | 19 | 16 | 16 | 17 | 16 | 12 | 14 | 13 | 14 | 11 | 10 | 19 |
| Coaches | 24 | 22 | 22 | 18 | 17 | 15 | 16 | 16 | 14 | 11 | 12 | 12 | 13 | 10 | 10 | 17 |
| Harris | Not released | | | | 18 | 16 | 16 | 16 | 14 | 10 | 10 | 11 | 13 | 10 | 10 | Not released |
| BCS | Not released | | | | | | | 18 | 17 | 14 | 16 | 16 | 15 | 12 | 10 | Not released |

== Game summaries ==
=== Northern Colorado ===
Northern Colorado Bears at No. 23 Hawaii Warriors – Game summary

| Quarter | 1 | 2 | 3 | 4 | Total |
|---|---|---|---|---|---|
| Bears | 0 | 0 | 0 | 6 | 6 |
| No. 23 Warriors | 28 | 14 | 7 | 14 | 63 |

at Aloha Stadium, Halawa, Hawaii

- Date: September 1
- Game time: 6:05 p.m. HST
- Game weather: Partly cloudy, 84 °F (29 °C)
- Game attendance: 40,252
- Referee: Bill Athan
- Box score, Recap

Game information
First quarter
- HAW – Kealoha Pilares 15-yard pass from Colt Brennan (Dan Kelly kick), 12:08. Warriors 7–0. Drive: 8 plays, 80 yards, 2:52.
- HAW – Jason Rivers 30-yard pass from Colt Brennan (Dan Kelly kick), 10:41. Warriors 14–0. Drive: 2 plays, 23 yards, 0:34.
- HAW – Davone Bess 5-yard pass from Colt Brennan (Dan Kelly kick), 7:48. Warriors 21–0. Drive: 6 plays, 40 yards, 1:47.
- HAW – C. J. Hawthorne 30-yard pass from Colt Brennan (Dan Kelly kick), 4:24. Warriors 28–0. Drive: 3 plays, 64 yards, 1:19.

Second quarter

- HAW – Davone Bess 2-yard pass from Colt Brennan (Dan Kelly kick), 14:39. Warriors 35–0. Drive: 7 plays, 63 yards, 2:27.
- HAW – Ryan Grice-Mullen 26-yard pass from Colt Brennan (Dan Kelly kick), 1:49. Warriors 42–0. Drive: 7 plays, 79 yards, 2:33.

Third quarter

- HAW – Michael Washington 80-yard punt return (Dan Kelly kick), 13:08. Warriors 49–0.

Fourth quarter

- UNCO – Mike Vlahogeorge 5-yard run (kick blocked), 10:22. Warriors 49–6. Drive: 6 plays, 38 yards, 2:51.
- HAW – Malcolm Lane 94-yard kickoff return (Dan Kelly kick), 10:08. Warriors 56–6.
- HAW – Greg Salas 24-yard pass from Inoke Funaki (Dan Kelly kick), 7:47. Warriors 63–6. Drive: 5 plays, 43 yards, 2:07.

| Statistics | UNCO | HAW |
|---|---|---|
| First downs | 14 | 30 |
| Total yards | 182 | 577 |
| Rushing yards | 50 | 37 |
| Passing yards | 132 | 540 |
| Turnovers | 3 | 2 |
| Time of possession | 31:59 | 28:01 |

| Team | Category | Player | Statistics |
|---|---|---|---|
| Northern Colorado | Passing | Mike Vlahogeorge | 9/13, 70 yards |
| Northern Colorado | Rushing | David Woods | 12 rushes, 27 yards |
| Northern Colorado | Receiving | Andy Birkel | 6 receptions, 49 yards |
| Hawaii | Passing | Colt Brennan | 34/40, 416 yards, 6 TD |
| Hawaii | Rushing | Colt Brennan | 3 rushes, 23 yards |
| Hawaii | Receiving | Ryan Grice-Mullen | 9 receptions, 130 yards, TD |

=== At Louisiana Tech ===
No. 20 Hawaii Warriors at Louisiana Tech Bulldogs – Game summary

| Quarter | 1 | 2 | 3 | 4 | OT | Total |
|---|---|---|---|---|---|---|
| No. 20 Warriors | 7 | 7 | 14 | 10 | 7 | 45 |
| Bulldogs | 14 | 7 | 10 | 7 | 6 | 44 |

at Joe Aillet Stadium, Ruston, Louisiana

- Date: September 8
- Game time: 1:00 p.m. HST / 6:00 p.m. CDT
- Game attendance: 22,135
- Referee: Frank White
- Box score, Recap

Game information
First quarter
- LT – Patrick Jackson 2-yard run (Danny Horwedel kick), 10:31. Bulldogs 7–0. Drive: 9 plays, 56 yards, 4:29.
- LT – Patrick Jackson 16-yard run (Danny Horwedel kick), 4:03. Bulldogs 14–0. Drive: 11 plays, 84 yards, 4:21.
- HAW – Leon Wright-Jackson 47-yard run (Dan Kelly kick), 1:43. Bulldogs 14–7. Drive: 5 plays, 75 yards, 2:20.

Second quarter

- HAW – Colt Brennan 3-yard run (Dan Kelly kick), 10:11. Tied 14–14. Drive: 11 plays, 99 yards, 4:37.
- LT – Daniel Porter 18-yard run (Danny Horwedel kick), 5:14. Bulldogs 21–14. Drive: 3 plays, 26 yards, 1:22.

Third quarter

- HAW – Ryan Grice-Mullen 64-yard pass from Colt Brennan (Dan Kelly kick), 9:47. Tied 21–21. Drive: 1 play, 64 yards, 0:10.
- LT – Danny Horwedel 42-yard field goal, 6:03. Bulldogs 24–21. Drive: 11 plays, 59 yards, 3:44.
- HAW – Ryan Grice-Mullen 17-yard pass from Colt Brennan (Dan Kelly kick), 2:04. Warriors 28–24. Drive: 9 plays, 67 yards, 3:59.
- LT – Josh Wheeler 3-yard pass from Zac Champion (Danny Horwedel kick), 0:48. Bulldogs 31–28. Drive: 3 plays, 33 yards, 0:35.

Fourth quarter

- HAW – Davone Bess 19-yard pass from Colt Brennan (Dan Kelly kick), 8:35. Warriors 35–31. Drive: 8 plays, 86 yards, 2:50.
- LT – Dennis Morris 1-yard run (Danny Horwedel kick), 3:01. Bulldogs 38–35. Drive: 6 plays, 31 yards, 2:50.
- HAW – Dan Kelly 49-yard field goal, 1:34. Tied 38–38. Drive: 7 plays, 34 yards, 1:27.

Overtime

- HAW – Jason Rivers 6-yard pass from Colt Brennan (Dan Kelly kick). Warriors 45–38. Drive: 8 plays, 25 yards.
- LT – Dustin Mitchell 2-yard pass from Zac Champion (pass failed). Warriors 45–44. Drive: 8 plays, 25 yards.

| Statistics | HAW | LT |
|---|---|---|
| First downs | 32 | 24 |
| Total yards | 593 | 410 |
| Rushing yards | 45 | 223 |
| Passing yards | 548 | 187 |
| Turnovers | 3 | 0 |
| Time of possession | 27:14 | 32:46 |

| Team | Category | Player | Statistics |
|---|---|---|---|
| Hawaii | Passing | Colt Brennan | 43/61, 548 yards, 4 TD, INT |
| Hawaii | Rushing | Leon Wright-Jackson | 6 rushes, 53 yards, TD |
| Hawaii | Receiving | Jason Rivers | 14 receptions, 176 yards, TD |
| Louisiana Tech | Passing | Zac Champion | 23/36, 187 yards, 2 TD |
| Louisiana Tech | Rushing | Patrick Jackson | 23 rushes, 98 yards, 2 TD |
| Louisiana Tech | Receiving | Joseph Anderson | 4 receptions, 41 yards |

=== At UNLV ===
No. 24 Hawaii Warriors at UNLV Rebels – Game summary

| Quarter | 1 | 2 | 3 | 4 | Total |
|---|---|---|---|---|---|
| No. 24 Warriors | 7 | 14 | 21 | 7 | 49 |
| Rebels | 7 | 0 | 0 | 7 | 14 |

at Sam Boyd Stadium, Las Vegas, Nevada

- Date: September 15
- Game time: 3:30 p.m. HST / 6:30 p.m. PDT
- Game weather: Mostly cloudy, 91 °F (33 °C)
- Game attendance: 38,125
- Referee: Paul Labenne
- Box score, Recap

Game information
First quarter
- UNLV – Frank Summers 6-yard pass from Travis Dixon (Sergio Aguayo kick), 8:02. Rebels 7–0. Drive: 13 plays, 79 yards, 5:38.
- HAW – Colt Brennan 1-yard run (Dan Kelly kick), 2:35. Tied 7–7. Drive: 11 plays, 67 yards, 5:19.

Second quarter

- HAW – Colt Brennan 1-yard run (Dan Kelly kick), 13:58. Warriors 14–7. Drive: 5 plays, 82 yards, 1:19.
- HAW – Ryan Grice-Mullen 13-yard pass from Colt Brennan (Dan Kelly kick), 9:25. Warriors 21–7. Drive: 4 plays, 34 yards, 2:05.

Third quarter

- HAW – Colt Brennan 3-yard run (Dan Kelly kick), 10:42. Warriors 28–7. Drive: 7 plays, 73 yards, 3:08.
- HAW – Jason Rivers 1-yard pass from Colt Brennan (Dan Kelly kick), 1:27. Warriors 35–7. Drive: 10 plays, 88 yards, 6:57.
- HAW – Ryan Mouton 40-yard interception return (Dan Kelly kick), 1:10. Warriors 42–7.

Fourth quarter

- UNLV – Omar Clayton 31-yard run (Sergio Aguayo kick), 4:25. Warriors 42–14. Drive: 10 plays, 78 yards, 3:32.
- HAW – Malcolm Lane 81-yard pass from Tyler Graunke (Dan Kelly kick), 2:38. Warriors 49–14. Drive: 3 plays, 81 yards, 1:37.

| Statistics | HAW | UNLV |
|---|---|---|
| First downs | 23 | 20 |
| Total yards | 492 | 349 |
| Rushing yards | 96 | 143 |
| Passing yards | 396 | 206 |
| Turnovers | 0 | 1 |
| Time of possession | 31:48 | 28:12 |

| Team | Category | Player | Statistics |
|---|---|---|---|
| Hawaii | Passing | Colt Brennan | 26/32, 298 yards, 2 TD |
| Hawaii | Rushing | Kealoha Pilares | 11 rushes, 62 yards |
| Hawaii | Receiving | C. J. Hawthorne | 9 receptions, 104 yards |
| UNLV | Passing | Travis Dixon | 19/37, 193 yards, TD, INT |
| UNLV | Rushing | Frank Summers | 12 rushes, 43 yards |
| UNLV | Receiving | Aaron Straiten | 5 receptions, 85 yards |

=== Charleston Southern ===
Charleston Southern Buccaneers at No. 19 Hawaii Warriors – Game summary

| Quarter | 1 | 2 | 3 | 4 | Total |
|---|---|---|---|---|---|
| Buccaneers | 7 | 3 | 0 | 0 | 10 |
| No. 19 Warriors | 7 | 14 | 28 | 17 | 66 |

at Aloha Stadium, Halawa, Hawaii

- Date: September 22
- Game time: 6:05 p.m. HST
- Game weather: Partly cloudy, 86 °F (30 °C)
- Game attendance: 37,723
- Referee: Drew George
- Box score, Recap

Game information
First quarter
- HAW – C. J. Hawthorne 28-yard pass from Tyler Graunke (Dan Kelly kick), 9:54. Warriors 7–0. Drive: 8 plays, 70 yards, 1:39.
- CHSO – Dee Brown 57-yard pass from Eli Byrd (Nick Ellis kick), 5:14. Tied 7–7. Drive: 5 plays, 68 yards, 1:46.

Second quarter

- HAW – Kealoha Pilares 16-yard run (Dan Kelly kick), 14:50. Warriors 14–7. Drive: 7 plays, 63 yards, 2:31.
- HAW – Tyler Graunke 6-yard run (Dan Kelly kick), 3:41. Warriors 21–7. Drive: 3 plays, 8 yards, 1:55.
- CHSO – Nick Ellis 48-yard field goal, 0:16. Warriors 21–10. Drive: 9 plays, 22 yards, 1:46.

Third quarter

- HAW – Ryan Mouton 90-yard kickoff return (Dan Kelly kick), 14:48. Warriors 28–10.
- HAW – Adam Leonard 36-yard interception return (Dan Kelly kick), 13:48. Warriors 35–10.
- HAW – Davone Bess 19-yard pass from Tyler Graunke (Dan Kelly kick), 8:19. Warriors 42–10. Drive: 8 plays, 71 yards, 3:08.
- HAW – C. J. Hawthorne 35-yard pass from Tyler Graunke (Dan Kelly kick), 2:57. Warriors 49–10. Drive: 5 plays, 54 yards, 2:00.

Fourth quarter

- HAW – Aaron Bain 2-yard pass from Inoke Funaki (Dan Kelly kick), 13:16. Warriors 56–10. Drive: 4 plays, 22 yards, 0:53.
- HAW – Dan Kelly 28-yard field goal, 8:57. Warriors 59–10. Drive: 8 plays, 58 yards, 2:25.
- HAW – Michael Washington 19-yard pass from Inoke Funaki (Dan Kelly kick), 4:38. Warriors 66–10. Drive: 4 plays, 45 yards, 2:11.

| Statistics | CHSO | HAW |
|---|---|---|
| First downs | 15 | 22 |
| Total yards | 311 | 510 |
| Rushing yards | 72 | 147 |
| Passing yards | 239 | 363 |
| Turnovers | 4 | 3 |
| Time of possession | 35:05 | 24:55 |

| Team | Category | Player | Statistics |
|---|---|---|---|
| Charleston Southern | Passing | Eli Byrd | 13/31, 184 yards, TD, 2 INT |
| Charleston Southern | Rushing | Eli Byrd | 10 rushes, 30 yards |
| Charleston Southern | Receiving | Dee Brown | 4 receptions, 82 yards, TD |
| Hawaii | Passing | Tyler Graunke | 22/36, 285 yards, 3 TD, 2 INT |
| Hawaii | Rushing | Kealoha Pilares | 7 rushes, 45 yards, TD |
| Hawaii | Receiving | C. J. Hawthorne | 5 receptions, 91 yards, 2 TD |

=== At Idaho ===
No. 19 Hawaii Warriors at Idaho Vandals – Game summary

| Quarter | 1 | 2 | 3 | 4 | Total |
|---|---|---|---|---|---|
| No. 19 Warriors | 14 | 27 | 7 | 0 | 48 |
| Vandals | 7 | 3 | 0 | 10 | 20 |

at Kibbie Dome, Moscow, Idaho

- Date: September 29
- Game time: 11:00 a.m. HST / 2:00 p.m. PDT
- Game weather: None (played indoors)
- Game attendance: 13,807
- Referee: Bill Athan
- Box score, Recap

Game information
First quarter
- HAW – Ryan Grice-Mullen 13-yard pass from Colt Brennan (Dan Kelly kick), 10:32. Warriors 7–0. Drive: 10 plays, 93 yards, 3:26.
- IDHO – Eddie Williams 8-yard run (Tino Amancio kick), 7:10. Tied 7–7. Drive: 8 plays, 75 yards, 3:15.
- HAW – Adam Leonard 40-yard interception return (Dan Kelly kick), 4:47. Warriors 14–7.

Second quarter

- HAW – Malcolm Lane 41-yard pass from Colt Brennan (Dan Kelly kick), 14:07. Warriors 21–7. Drive: 10 plays, 83 yards, 4:03.
- HAW – Davone Bess 24-yard pass from Colt Brennan (Dan Kelly kick), 10:44. Warriors 28–7. Drive: 4 plays, 71 yards, 1:47.
- HAW – Dan Kelly 39-yard field goal, 3:52. Warriors 31–7. Drive: 9 plays, 45 yards, 2:42.
- HAW – Myron Newberry 76-yard interception return (Dan Kelly kick), 2:42. Warriors 38–7.
- IDHO – Tino Amancio 50-yard field goal, 0:36. Warriors 38–10. Drive: 7 plays, 31 yards, 1:49.
- HAW – Dan Kelly 25-yard field goal, 0:00. Warriors 41–10. Drive: 5 plays, 43 yards, 0:29.

Third quarter

- HAW – Colt Brennan 1-yard run (Dan Kelly kick), 3:04. Warriors 48–10. Drive: 11 plays, 78 yards, 4:10.

Fourth quarter

- IDHO – Tino Amancio 49-yard field goal, 5:42. Warriors 48–13. Drive: 13 plays, 49 yards, 5:04.
- IDHO – Eddie Williams 35-yard pass from Nathan Enderle (Tino Amancio kick), 3:21. Warriors 48–20. Drive: 2 plays, 45 yards, 0:59.

| Statistics | HAW | IDHO |
|---|---|---|
| First downs | 31 | 19 |
| Total yards | 485 | 303 |
| Rushing yards | 91 | 90 |
| Passing yards | 394 | 213 |
| Turnovers | 6 | 5 |
| Time of possession | 31:04 | 28:56 |

| Team | Category | Player | Statistics |
|---|---|---|---|
| Hawaii | Passing | Colt Brennan | 30/49, 369 yards, 3 TD, 5 INT |
| Hawaii | Rushing | Kealoha Pilares | 10 rushes, 85 yards |
| Hawaii | Receiving | Davone Bess | 12 receptions, 162 yards, TD |
| Idaho | Passing | Nathan Enderle | 15/34, 186 yards, TD, 5 INT |
| Idaho | Rushing | Deonte Jackson | 7 rushes, 47 yards |
| Idaho | Receiving | Eddie Williams | 5 receptions, 78 yards, TD |

=== Utah State ===
Utah State Aggies at No. 16 Hawaii Warriors – Game summary

| Quarter | 1 | 2 | 3 | 4 | Total |
|---|---|---|---|---|---|
| Aggies | 10 | 3 | 14 | 10 | 37 |
| No. 16 Warriors | 10 | 21 | 21 | 0 | 52 |

at Aloha Stadium, Halawa, Hawaii

- Date: October 6
- Game time: 6:05 p.m. HST
- Game weather: Rain, 81 °F (27 °C)
- Game attendance: 36,360
- Referee: Bill McCabe
- Box score, Recap

| Statistics | USU | HAW |
|---|---|---|
| First downs | | |
| Total yards | | |
| Rushing yards | | |
| Passing yards | | |
| Turnovers | | |
| Time of possession | | |

| Team | Category | Player | Statistics |
|---|---|---|---|
| Utah State | Passing | | |
| Utah State | Rushing | | |
| Utah State | Receiving | | |
| Hawaii | Passing | | |
| Hawaii | Rushing | | |
| Hawaii | Receiving | | |

=== At San Jose State ===
No. 16 Hawaii Warriors at San Jose State Spartans – Game summary

| Quarter | 1 | 2 | 3 | 4 | OT | Total |
|---|---|---|---|---|---|---|
| No. 16 Warriors | 7 | 7 | 7 | 14 | 7 | 42 |
| Spartans | 0 | 7 | 21 | 7 | 0 | 35 |

at Spartan Stadium, San Jose, California

- Date: October 12
- Game time: 2:00 p.m. HST / 5:00 p.m. PDT
- Game weather: Overcast, 59 °F (15 °C)
- Game attendance: 20,473
- Referee: Drew George
- Box score, Recap

| Statistics | HAW | SJSU |
|---|---|---|
| First downs | | |
| Total yards | | |
| Rushing yards | | |
| Passing yards | | |
| Turnovers | | |
| Time of possession | | |

| Team | Category | Player | Statistics |
|---|---|---|---|
| Hawaii | Passing | | |
| Hawaii | Rushing | | |
| Hawaii | Receiving | | |
| San Jose State | Passing | | |
| San Jose State | Rushing | | |
| San Jose State | Receiving | | |

=== New Mexico State ===
New Mexico State Aggies at No. 16 Hawaii Warriors – Game summary

| Quarter | 1 | 2 | 3 | 4 | Total |
|---|---|---|---|---|---|
| Aggies | 0 | 3 | 10 | 0 | 13 |
| No. 16 Warriors | 13 | 10 | 13 | 14 | 50 |

at Aloha Stadium, Halawa, Hawaii

- Date: October 27
- Game time: 6:05 p.m. HST
- Game weather: Mostly cloudy, 83 °F (28 °C)
- Game attendance: 41,218
- Referee: Dave Nesmith
- Box score, Recap

| Statistics | NMSU | HAW |
|---|---|---|
| First downs | | |
| Total yards | | |
| Rushing yards | | |
| Passing yards | | |
| Turnovers | | |
| Time of possession | | |

| Team | Category | Player | Statistics |
|---|---|---|---|
| New Mexico State | Passing | | |
| New Mexico State | Rushing | | |
| New Mexico State | Receiving | | |
| Hawaii | Passing | | |
| Hawaii | Rushing | | |
| Hawaii | Receiving | | |

=== Fresno State ===
Fresno State Bulldogs at No. 14 Hawaii Warriors – Game summary

| Quarter | 1 | 2 | 3 | 4 | Total |
|---|---|---|---|---|---|
| Bulldogs | 7 | 9 | 0 | 14 | 30 |
| No. 14 Warriors | 24 | 10 | 0 | 3 | 37 |

at Aloha Stadium, Halawa, Hawaii

- Date: November 10
- Game time: 6:00 p.m. HST
- Game weather: 79 °F (26 °C)
- Game attendance: 49,047
- Referee: Bill Athan
- Box score, Recap

| Statistics | FRES | HAW |
|---|---|---|
| First downs | | |
| Total yards | | |
| Rushing yards | | |
| Passing yards | | |
| Turnovers | | |
| Time of possession | | |

| Team | Category | Player | Statistics |
|---|---|---|---|
| Fresno State | Passing | | |
| Fresno State | Rushing | | |
| Fresno State | Receiving | | |
| Hawaii | Passing | | |
| Hawaii | Rushing | | |
| Hawaii | Receiving | | |

=== At Nevada ===
No. 13 Hawaii Warriors at Nevada Wolf Pack – Game summary

| Quarter | 1 | 2 | 3 | 4 | Total |
|---|---|---|---|---|---|
| No. 13 Warriors | 5 | 14 | 0 | 9 | 28 |
| Wolf Pack | 0 | 10 | 10 | 6 | 26 |

at Mackay Stadium, Reno, Nevada

- Date: November 16
- Game time: 6:00 p.m. HST / 8:00 p.m. PST
- Game weather: Partly cloudy, 56 °F (13 °C)
- Game attendance: 22,437
- Referee: Bill McCabe
- Box score, Recap

| Statistics | HAW | NEV |
|---|---|---|
| First downs | | |
| Total yards | | |
| Rushing yards | | |
| Passing yards | | |
| Turnovers | | |
| Time of possession | | |

| Team | Category | Player | Statistics |
|---|---|---|---|
| Hawaii | Passing | | |
| Hawaii | Rushing | | |
| Hawaii | Receiving | | |
| Nevada | Passing | | |
| Nevada | Rushing | | |
| Nevada | Receiving | | |

=== No. 17 Boise State ===
No. 17 Boise State Broncos at No. 14 Hawaii Warriors – Game summary

| Quarter | 1 | 2 | 3 | 4 | Total |
|---|---|---|---|---|---|
| No. 17 Broncos | 7 | 10 | 10 | 0 | 27 |
| No. 14 Warriors | 7 | 12 | 20 | 0 | 39 |

at Aloha Stadium, Halawa, Hawaii

- Date: November 23
- Game time: 4:00 p.m. HST
- Game weather: Partly cloudy, 81 °F (27 °C)
- Game attendance: 50,000
- Referee: Gerald Wright
- Box score, Recap

Game information
First quarter
- BSU – Ian Johnson 50-yard run (Kyle Brotzman kick), 5:13. Broncos 7–0. Drive: 1 play, 50 yards, 0:10.
- HAW – Ryan Grice-Mullen 6-yard pass from Colt Brennan (Dan Kelly kick), 3:53. Tied 7–7. Drive: 5 plays, 70 yards, 1:14.

Second quarter

- HAW – Colt Brennan 1-yard run (kick blocked), 14:12. Warriors 13–7. Drive: 7 plays, 95 yards, 2:27.
- BSU – Ian Johnson 1-yard run (Kyle Brotzman kick), 8:39. Broncos 14–13. Drive: 11 plays, 69 yards, 5:27.
- HAW – Davone Bess 23-yard pass from Colt Brennan (kick blocked), 5:33. Warriors 19–14. Drive: 8 plays, 67 yards, 3:00.
- BSU – Kyle Brotzman 39-yard field goal, 1:35. Warriors 19–17. Drive: 4 plays, 11 yards, 1:48.

Third quarter

- HAW – Davone Bess 22-yard pass from Colt Brennan (Dan Kelly kick), 13:20. Warriors 26–17. Drive: 6 plays, 70 yards, 1:33.
- BSU – Richie Brockel 6-yard pass from Taylor Thorp (Kyle Brotzman kick), 9:03. Warriors 26–24. Drive: 9 plays, 50 yards, 4:17.
- BSU – Kyle Brotzman 36-yard field goal, 6:52. Broncos 27–26. Drive: 4 plays, 3 yards, 2:01.
- HAW – Jason Rivers 7-yard pass from Colt Brennan (pass failed), 3:23. Warriors 32–27. Drive: 10 plays, 70 yards, 3:20.
- HAW – C. J. Hawthorne 38-yard pass from Colt Brennan (Dan Kelly kick), 0:26. Warriors 39–27. Drive: 4 plays, 85 yards, 1:06.

| Statistics | BSU | HAW |
|---|---|---|
| First downs | 19 | 33 |
| Total yards | 332 | 574 |
| Rushing yards | 101 | 79 |
| Passing yards | 231 | 495 |
| Turnovers | 2 | 2 |
| Time of possession | 32:15 | 27:45 |

| Team | Category | Player | Statistics |
|---|---|---|---|
| Boise State | Passing | Taylor Tharp | 22/36, 231 yards, TD, INT |
| Boise State | Rushing | Ian Johnson | 22 rushes, 86 yards, 2 TD |
| Boise State | Receiving | Jeremy Childs | 8 receptions, 102 yards |
| Hawaii | Passing | Colt Brennan | 40/53, 495 yards, 5 TD, 2 INT |
| Hawaii | Rushing | Kealoha Pilares | 9 rushes, 48 yards |
| Hawaii | Receiving | Davone Bess | 15 receptions, 181 yards, 2 TD |

=== Washington ===
Washington Huskies at No. 11 Hawaii Warriors – Game summary

| Quarter | 1 | 2 | 3 | 4 | Total |
|---|---|---|---|---|---|
| Huskies | 21 | 7 | 0 | 0 | 28 |
| No. 11 Warriors | 0 | 21 | 0 | 14 | 35 |

at Aloha Stadium, Halawa, Hawaii

- Date: December 1
- Game time: 6:30 p.m. HST
- Game weather: Partly cloudy, 78 °F (26 °C)
- Game attendance: 50,000
- Referee: Frank White
- Box score, Recap

Game information
First quarter
- WASH – Jake Locker 8-yard run (Ryan Perkins kick), 11:23. Huskies 7–0. Drive: 8 plays, 56 yards, 3:37.
- WASH – Luke Kravitz 1-yard run (Ryan Perkins kick), 8:30. Huskies 14–0. Drive: 5 plays, 21 yards, 1:58.
- WASH – Luke Kravitz 2-yard run (Ryan Perkins kick), 5:23. Huskies 21–0. Drive: 6 plays, 51 yards, 1:52.

Second quarter

- HAW – Jason Rivers 7-yard pass from Colt Brennan (Dan Kelly kick), 10:17. Huskies 21–7. Drive: 10 plays, 83 yards, 4:25.
- WASH – Paul Horner 1-yard run (Ryan Perkins kick), 7:08. Huskies 28–7. Drive: 7 plays, 84 yards, 3:03.
- HAW – Jason Rivers 3-yard pass from Colt Brennan (Dan Kelly kick), 4:11. Huskies 28–14. Drive: 6 plays, 75 yards, 2:52.
- HAW – Jason Rivers 13-yard pass from Colt Brennan (Dan Kelly kick), 0:21. Huskies 28–21. Drive: 5 plays, 80 yards, 1:06.

Third quarter

- No scoring plays

Fourth quarter

- HAW – Jason Rivers 40-yard pass from Colt Brennan (Dan Kelly kick), 8:01. Tied 28–28. Drive: 6 plays, 73 yards, 2:15.
- HAW – Ryan Grice-Mullen 5-yard pass from Colt Brennan (Dan Kelly kick), 0:44. Warriors 35–28. Drive: 8 plays, 76 yards, 3:31.

| Statistics | WASH | HAW |
|---|---|---|
| First downs | 21 | 27 |
| Total yards | 403 | 538 |
| Rushing yards | 261 | 96 |
| Passing yards | 142 | 442 |
| Turnovers | 1 | 3 |
| Time of possession | 29:26 | 30:34 |

| Team | Category | Player | Statistics |
|---|---|---|---|
| Washington | Passing | Jake Locker | 9/17, 142 yards, INT |
| Washington | Rushing | Louis Rankin | 21 rushes, 145 yards |
| Washington | Receiving | Marcel Reece | 2 receptions, 62 yards |
| Hawaii | Passing | Colt Brennan | 42/50, 442 yards, 5 TD |
| Hawaii | Rushing | Daniel Libre | 10 rushes, 82 yards |
| Hawaii | Receiving | Jason Rivers | 14 receptions, 167 yards, 4 TD |

=== Vs. No. 4 Georgia (Sugar Bowl) ===
2008 Sugar Bowl
No. 10 Hawaii Warriors vs. No. 4 Georgia Bulldogs – Game summary

| Quarter | 1 | 2 | 3 | 4 | Total |
|---|---|---|---|---|---|
| No. 10 Warriors | 3 | 0 | 0 | 7 | 10 |
| No. 4 Bulldogs | 14 | 10 | 14 | 3 | 41 |

at Louisiana Superdome, New Orleans, Louisiana

- Date: January 1, 2007
- Game time: 3:30 p.m. HST / 7:30 p.m. CST
- Game weather: None (played indoors)
- Game attendance: 74,383
- Referee: Brian O'Cain
- TV announcers (Fox): Thom Brennaman, Charles Davis, and Chris Myers
- Box score, Recap

Game information
First quarter
- UGA – Knowshon Moreno 17-yard run (Brandon Coutu kick), 9:42. Bulldogs 7–0. Drive: 9 plays, 61 yards, 4:09.
- HAW – Dan Kelly 41-yard field goal, 4:20. Bulldogs 7–3. Drive: 11 plays, 42 yards, 5:22.
- UGA – Knowshon Moreno 11-yard run (Brandon Coutu kick), 0:57. Bulldogs 14–3. Drive: 7 plays, 65 yards, 3:23.

Second quarter

- UGA – Brandon Coutu 52-yard field goal, 9:36. Bulldogs 17–3. Drive: 10 plays, 20 yards, 4:48.
- UGA – Sean Bailey 11-yard pass from Matthew Stafford (Brandon Coutu kick), 8:00. Bulldogs 24–3. Drive: 4 plays, 42 yards, 1:25.

Third quarter

- UGA – Marcus Howard 0-yard fumble return (Brandon Coutu kick), 8:57. Bulldogs 31–3.
- UGA – Thomas Brown 1-yard run (Brandon Coutu kick), 1:40. Bulldogs 38–3. Drive: 6 plays, 50 yards, 2:15.

Fourth quarter

- UGA – Brandon Coutu 45-yard field goal, 14:32. Bulldogs 41–3. Drive: 7 plays, 28 yards, 0:58.
- HAW – Ryan Grice-Mullen 16-yard pass from Tyler Graunke (Dan Kelly kick), 10:32. Bulldogs 41–10. Drive: 9 plays, 65 yards, 4:00.

| Statistics | HAW | UGA |
|---|---|---|
| First downs | 20 | 19 |
| Total yards | 306 | 335 |
| Rushing yards | -5 | 160 |
| Passing yards | 311 | 175 |
| Turnovers | 6 | 1 |
| Time of possession | 30:39 | 29:21 |

| Team | Category | Player | Statistics |
|---|---|---|---|
| Hawaii | Passing | Colt Brennan | 22/38, 169 yards, 3 INT |
| Hawaii | Rushing | Kealoha Pilares | 7 rushes, 26 yards |
| Hawaii | Receiving | Jason Rivers | 10 receptions, 105 yards |
| Georgia | Passing | Matthew Stafford | 14/23, 175 yards, TD, INT |
| Georgia | Rushing | Thomas Brown | 19 rushes, 73 yards, TD |
| Georgia | Receiving | Mohamed Massaquoi | 5 receptions, 54 yards |

== Personnel ==
=== Roster ===
| # | PLAYER'S NAME | POS. | HT. | WT. | CL | HOMETOWN | # | PLAYER'S NAME | POS. | HT. | WT. | CL | HOMETOWN |
|---|---|---|---|---|---|---|---|---|---|---|---|---|---|
| 1 | Ryan Grice-Mullen | WR | 5'11" | 180 | Jr. | Rialto, California | 45 | Jason Laumoli | RB | 5'10" | 287 | Sr. | Pago-Pago, Am. Samoa |
| 2 | C.J. Hawthorne | WR | 5'11" | 168 | Sr. | Gulfport, Mississippi | 45 | Spencer Smith | DB | 5'11" | 195 | Fr. | Marietta, Georgia |
| 3 | Myron Newberry | DB | 5'9" | 174 | Sr. | Denton, Texas | 46 | Victor Clore | DL | 6'3" | 244 | So. | Kaneohe, HI |
| 4 | Leon Wright-Jackson | RB | 6'1" | 211 | Jr. | Pasco, Washington | 47 | Joshua Rice | LB | 5'11" | 212 | So. | Las Vegas, Nevada |
| 5 | Mike Washington | WR | 5'7" | 173 | Jr. | Aliquippa, Pennsylvania | 48 | David Farmer | RB | 6–1 | 224 | Jr. | Santa Cruz, California |
| 6 | Tyler Graunke | QB | 6'0" | 185 | Jr. | Tucson, Arizona | 49 | Jared Lane | LB | 6'3" | 222 | Fr. | Altus, Oklahoma |
| 7 | Davone Bess | WR | 5'10" | 195 | Jr. | Oakland, California | 50 | Laupepa Letuli | OL | 6'3" | 290 | So. | Torrance, California |
| 8 | Tyson Kafentzis | LB | 6'1" | 203 | Jr. | Richland, Washington | 50 | Mana Lolotai | LB | 6'0" | 218 | Fr. | Honolulu, HI |
| 8 | Jake Santos | QB | 5'11" | 202 | Jr. | San Diego | 51 | Lafu Tuioti-Mariner | OL | 6'0" | 285 | Jr. | Corona, California |
| 9 | Rick Taylor | WR | 5'9" | 173 | Fr. | Ponte Vedra Beach, Florida | 52 | Rustin Saole | LB | 5'11" | 236 | Sr. | Waipahu, HI |
| 9 | Ryan Keomaka | DB | 5'10" | 177 | Sr. | Honolulu | 53 | Blaze Soares | LB | 6'1" | 239 | So. | Kaneohe, HI |
| 10 | Timo Paepule | LB | 6'0" | 252 | Sr. | Kaneohe, HI | 54 | Amani Purcell | DL | 6'4" | 277 | Sr. | Pago-Pago, Am. Samoa |
| 10 | Shane Austin | QB | 6'0" | 183 | Fr. | Camarillo, California | 55 | John Estes | OL | 6'2" | 292 | So. | Stockton, California |
| 11 | Inoke Funaki | QB | 5'11" | 193 | So. | Laie, HI | 56 | Sila Lefiti | OL | 6'0" | 292 | Fr. | Santa Ana, California |
| 12 | Kiran Kepo'o | QB | 6'1" | 218 | Fr. | Honolulu | 56 | Nate Russell | DL | 6'3" | 270 | Sr. | Waianae, HI |
| 12 | Karl Noa | DL | 6'4" | 251 | Sr. | Waianae, HI | 57 | Jake Ingram | LS | 6'4" | 234 | Jr. | Mililani, HI |
| 13 | Brashton Satele | LB | 6'1" | 243 | So. | Mililani, HI | 58 | John Fonoti | DL | 6'3" | 250 | So. | Honolulu |
| 15 | Colt Brennan | QB | 6'3" | 201 | Sr. | Irvine, California | 58 | Joey Lipp | OL | 6'3" | 277 | Fr. | Chino, California |
| 15 | Josh Aufai | DB | 5'11" | 190 | So. | Starwood, Washington | 59 | R.J. Kiesel-Kauhane | LB | 5'11" | 225 | So. | Aiea, HI |
| 16 | JoPierre Davis | DB | 6'0" | 199 | So. | San Francisco | 60 | Lucas Kennard | OL | 6'1" | 253 | Fr. | Kailua, HI |
| 17 | Solomon Elimimian | LB | 5'11" | 218 | Jr. | Los Angeles | 61 | Austin Hansen | OL | 6'4" | 280 | Fr. | San Jose, California |
| 18 | Guyton Galdeira | DB | 5'7" | 165 | Jr. | Wahiawa, HI | 62 | Keith AhSoon | OL | 6'1" | 315 | Jr. | Pago-Pago, Am. Samoa |
| 19 | Erik Robinson | DB | 5'11" | 194 | Jr. | Dallas | 63 | Brysen Ginlack | OL | 6'2" | 290 | Fr. | Kailua, HI |
| 20 | Le'Marcus Gibson | DB | 5'10" | 184 | Fr. | Starkville, Massachusetts | 64 | Ray Hisatake | OL | 6'3" | 314 | Jr. | San Mateo, California |
| 20 | Jon Medeiros | WR | 5'8" | 195 | So. | Kapolei, HI | 65 | Hercules Satele | OL | 6'2" | 293 | Sr. | Long Beach, California |
| 21 | Kealoha Pilares | RB | 5'11" | 190 | Fr. | Wahiawa, HI | 66 | Adrian Thomas | OL | 6'5" | 314 | Fr. | Bangor, Australia |
| 21 | Kirk Alexander | DB | 6'2" | 214 | Jr. | Altadena, California | 67 | Mike Lafaele | DL | 6'1" | 302 | Sr. | Honolulu |
| 22 | Jayson Rego | RB | 5'9" | 198 | So. | Wailuku | 70 | Daniel Otineru | OL | 6'3" | 284 | Jr. | Kapolei, HI |
| 22 | Jakeem Hawkins | DB | 5'11" | 174 | Sr. | Sacramento, California | 71 | Travis Campbell | Ol | 6'4" | 276 | Fr. | Temecula, California |
| 23 | Alonzo Chopp | RB | 6'0" | 239 | Jr. | Hearne, Texas | 72 | Clayton Laurel | DL | 6'2" | 275 | Fr. | Wahiawa, HI |
| 23 | Gerard Lewis | DB | 5'9" | 175 | Sr. | Houston | 73 | Larry Sauafea | OL | 6'2" | 294 | Sr. | Pago-Pago, Am. Samoa |
| 24 | Desmond Thomas | DB | 6'3" | 174 | Jr. | Vallejo, California | 74 | Raphael Ieru | OL | 6'2" | 309 | So. | Honolulu |
| 25 | Cannon Berrong | RB | 5'7" | 229 | Sr. | Lawrenceville, Georgia | 75 | Alasi Toilolo | DE | 6'3" | 255 | Fr. | Kapolei, HI |
| 25 | Ryan Perry | DB | 5'7" | 172 | So. | Charlotte, North Carolina | 76 | Nathan McKay | OL | 6'2" | 208 | So. | Lake Oswego, Oregon |
| 26 | Daniel Libre | RB | 5'8" | 185 | Jr. | Holuala, HI | 77 | Aaron Kia | OL | 6'5" | 298 | So. | Mililani, HI |
| 26 | Micah Lau | LB | 5'9" | 211 | Sr. | Honolulu | 78 | Keoni Steinhoff | OL | 6'3" | 282 | Jr. | Ewa Beach, HI |
| 27 | Khevin Peoples | RB | 5'11" | 202 | Jr. | Tampa, Florida | 79 | Daniel Johnson | OL | 6'4" | 290 | So. | Issaquah, Washington |
| 27 | Ryan Mouton | DB | 5'10" | 185 | Jr. | Katy, Texas | 80 | Antwan Mahaley | DE | 6'5" | 216 | So. | Carson, California |
| 28 | Erik Pedersen | LB | 6'0" | 199 | So. | Palos Verdes, California | 81 | Dylan Linkner | WR | 6'0" | 203 | Jr. | Kailua, HI |
| 29 | Keenan Jones | DB | 5'11' | 181 | sr. | Harbor City, California | 82 | Jett Jasper | WR | 6'1" | 200 | Fr. | Lihue, HI |
| 29 | Camron Carmona | RB | 5'8" | 172 | Jr. | Yorba Linda, California | 83 | Mitch Farney | WR | 5'11 | 186 | Fr. | Phoenix, Arizona |
| 30 | Dane Porlas | DB | 5'10 | 186 | Jr. | San Diego | 84 | Jason Rivers | WR | 6'2" | 189 | Sr. | Waipahu, HI |
| 31 | Jacob Patek | DB | 6'0" | 204 | Sr. | Victoria, Texas | 85 | Aaron Bain | WR | 5'9" | 190 | Jr. | Aiea, HI |
| 33 | C.J. Allen-Jones | LB | 6'2" | 222 | Jr. | Aberdeen, Maryland | 86 | Dan Kelly | K | 6'3" | 212 | Jr. | Temecula, California |
| 34 | A.J. Martinez | DB | 5'11" | 173 | Sr. | Fountain Valley, California | 87 | Cameron Allen-Jones | OL | 6'2" | 273 | So. | Aberdeen, Maryland |
| 35 | Keao Monteilh | DB | 5'11" | 193 | Jr. | Honolulu, HI | 88 | Eric Shaffer | WR | 5'9" | 185 | Fr. | Springdale, Arizona |
| 36 | Viliami Nauahi | DB | 6'1" | 220 | So. | Laie, HI | 89 | Malcolm Lane | WR | 6'2" | 184 | So. | Ft. Lauderdale, Florida |
| 36 | Greg Salas | WR | 6'2" | 196 | Fr. | Chino, California | 90 | Elliott Purcell | DL | 6'3" | 240 | Fr. | Ewa Beach, HI |
| 37 | Adam Kong | DB | 5'10" | 205 | So. | Seattle, WA | 91 | LeMaris Lee | DB | 6'2" | 220 | Jr. | Kapolei, HI |
| 38 | Kenny Estes | DB | 6'0" | 193 | Fr. | Waiamea, Kauai, HI | 92 | Christopher Leatigaga | DE | 6'4" | 272 | Jr. | Los Altos, California |
| 39 | Royce Pollard | WR | 6'2" | 174 | Fr. | San Diego, California | 92 | Rocky Savaiigaea | DL | 6'2" | 300 | So. | Ewa Beach, HI |
| 40 | Largon Pau | RB | 5'8" | 220 | Jr. | Honolulu | 93 | Keala Watson | DL | 6'3" | 300 | Jr. | Nanakuli, HI |
| 41 | Joe Avery | WR | 6'5" | 180 | Fr. | Carson, California | 94 | David Veikune | DL | 6'3" | 252 | Jr. | Wahiawa, HI |
| 42 | Calvin Roberts | DB | 5'11" | 190 | Jr. | San Francisco | 95 | Vaughn Meatoga | DL | 6'2" | 286 | Fr. | Kalaheo, Kauai, HI |
| 43 | Briton Forester | K | 5'9" | 175 | So. | San Diego | 96 | Fale Laeli | DL | 6'1" | 292 | Jr. | Honolulu, HI |
| 44 | Po'okela Ahmad | LB | 6'1" | 223 | Fr. | Kapolei, HI | 96 | Tim Grasso | P/H | 5'11" | 221 | Jr. | Kaysville, Utah |
| 45 | Kevin Konrath | LB | 6'3" | 221 | Fr. | Chicago | 97 | Siave Seti | DL | 6'0" | 291 | Sr. | Long Beach, California |
| 46 | Korey Reynolds | RB | 6'3" | 229 | Fr. | Hoover, Alabama | 98 | Francis Maka | DL | 6'2" | 240 | Sr. | San Mateo, California |
| 47 | Brad Kalilimoku | LB | 5'10" | 221 | Sr. | Honolulu | 99 | Joshua Leonard | DE | 6'3" | 274 | Jr. | Elverta, California |
| 48 | Adam Leonard | LB | 6'0" | 236 | Jr. | Seattle | 99 | Hammy Vasconcelos | RB | 5'9" | 250 | So. | Joao Pessoa, Brazil |

Mario Cox: Dismissed from the team on October 30, 2007. He had played in five games this season. more

=== Coaching staff ===
| Name | Position |
|---|---|
| June Jones | Head coach / offensive coordinator |
| George Lumpkin | Associate head coach |
| Greg McMackin | Defensive coordinator |
| Cal Lee | Linebackers |
| Ron Lee | Receivers |
| Dennis McKnight | Offensive Line |
| Rich Miano | Secondary |
| Dan Morrison | Quarterbacks |
| Jeff Reinebold | Defensive Line |
| Wes Suan | Running backs |
| Mel deLaura | Strength Coach |
| Terry Duffield | Graduate Assistant |
| Brian Kajiyama | Graduate Assistant |
| Lopaka Ornellas | Video coordinator |

== Statistics ==
=== Team statistics ===
| Statistic | Hawaii | Opponents |
|---|---|---|
| First downs | 327 | 243 |
| >Rushing | 53 | 95 |
| >Passing | 252 | 129 |
| >Penalty | 22 | 19 |
| Rushing | 949 | 1580 |
| >Yards gained rushing | 1183 | 1999 |
| >Yards lost rushing | 234 | 419 |
| >Rushing attempts | 261 | 460 |
| >Ave. per rush | 3.6 | 3.4 |
| >Ave. per game | 79.1 | 131.7 |
| >TDs rushing | 16 | 17 |
| Passing | 5402 | 2607 |
| >Att-comp-int | 606–424–19 | 427–245–19 |
| >Ave. per pass | 8.9 | 6.1 |
| >Ave. per catch | 12.7 | 10.6 |
| >TDs passing | 50 | 15 |
| Total offense | 6351 | 4187 |
| >Total plays | 867 | 887 |
| >Ave. per play | 7.3 | 4.7 |
| >Ave. per game | 529.2 | 348.9 |
| Kick returns: no-yards | 54-1307 | 85–1972 |
| Punt returns: no-yards | 22–303 | 14–250 |
| INT. returns: no-yards: | 19–421 | 19–227 |
| Fumbles-lost | 27–10 | 25–9 |
| Penalties-yards | 80–771 | 74–627 |
| Punts-yards | 32-1288 | 68–2774 |
| Time of possession | 27:48 | 32:22 |
| 3rd-down conversions | 68/141 | 53/185 |
| 4th-down conversions | 9/18 | 18/30 |

=== Player statistics ===
- QB Colt Brennan: 359/510 (70.4%) for 4,343 yards and 38 TD vs. 17 INT. 82 carries for 27 yards and 8 TD.
- QB Tyler Graunke: 90/137 (65.7%) for 1,234 yards and 10 TD vs. 6 INT. 21 carries for 11 yards and 3 TD.
- RB Kealoha Pilares: 68 carries for 388 yards and 3 TD. 26 catches for 249 yards and 1 TD.
- RB Leon Wright-Jackson: 33 carries for 219 yards and 2 TD. 16 catches for 146 yards and 0 TD.
- WR Ryan Grice-Mullen: 106 catches for 1,372 yards and 13 TD.
- WR Davone Bess: 108 catches for 1,266 yards and 12 TD.
- WR Jason Rivers: 92 catches for 1,174 yards and 13 TD.
- WR C.J. Hawthorne: 61 catches for 859 yards and 6 TD.
- WR Malcolm Lane: 14 catches for 270 yards and 2 TD.
