= 2007 Georgia Bulldogs football team =

American college football season

2007 Georgia Bulldogs football

SEC Eastern Division co-champion Sugar Bowl champion

Sugar Bowl, W 41–10 vs. Hawaii
- Conference: Southeastern Conference
- Eastern Division

Ranking
- Coaches: No. 3
- AP: No. 2
- Record: 11–2 (6–2 SEC)
- Head coach: Mark Richt (7th season)
- Offensive coordinator: Mike Bobo (1st season)
- Offensive scheme: Pro-style
- Defensive coordinator: Willie Martinez (3rd season)
- Base defense: 4–3
- Home stadium: Sanford Stadium

Uniform

2007 Southeastern Conference football standings
	Conf.			Overall
Team	W		L	W		L
Eastern Division
No. 12 Tennessee xy	6	–	2	10	–	4
No. 2 Georgia x%	6	–	2	11	–	2
No. 13 Florida	5	–	3	9	–	4
South Carolina	3	–	5	6	–	6
Kentucky	3	–	5	8	–	5
Vanderbilt	2	–	6	5	–	7
Western Division
No. 1 LSU x$#	6	–	2	12	–	2
No. 15 Auburn	5	–	3	9	–	4
Arkansas	4	–	4	8	–	5
Mississippi State	4	–	4	8	–	5
Alabama	4	–	4	7	–	6
Ole Miss	0	–	8	3	–	9
Championship: LSU 21, Tennessee 14
# – BCS National Champion; $ – BCS representative as conference champion; % – BCS at-large representative; x – Division champion/co-champions; y – Championship game participant; Alabama had 5 victories vacated by the NCAA in 2010. As such, the official record for Alabama is 2–6 (1–4).; Rankings from AP Poll

The 2007 Georgia Bulldogs football team represented the University of Georgia as a member of the Southeastern Conference (SEC) during the 2007 NCAA Division I FBS football season. Led by seventh-year head coach Mark Richt, the Bulldogs compiled an overall record of 11–2 with a mark of 6–2 in conference play, sharing the SEC's Eastern Division title with Tennessee. Based on a head-to-head win over Georgia, Tennessee advanced to the SEC Championship Game. Georgia was invited to the Sugar Bowl, where the Bulldogs defeated Hawaii. The team played home games at Sanford Stadium in Athens, Georgia.

Georgia opened the season with an impressive win at home against Oklahoma State, but failed to score a touchdown the following week in a loss to South Carolina. The Bulldogs rebounded against Western Carolina and enjoyed an overtime victory on September 22 at Alabama. Other high moments during the season were the upset win against Florida, 42–30, and the win against Auburn, 45–20, as Georgia wore black jerseys for the first time. The season ended on a high note as the Bulldogs defeated the undefeated Hawaii Warriors and their high-potent offense led by record-setting quarterback Colt Brennan in the Sugar Bowl in New Orleans, 41–10.

== Schedule ==
Before the season, CNNSI.com ranked the Georgia UGA schedule as the 14th-hardest in the country.

Date	Time	Opponent	Rank	Site	TV	Result	Attendance	Source
September 1	6:45 p.m.	Oklahoma State*	No. 13	Sanford Stadium; Athens, GA	ESPN2	W 35–14	92,746	
September 8	5:45 p.m.	South Carolina	No. 11	Sanford Stadium; Athens, GA (rivalry)	ESPN2	L 12–16	92,746	
September 15	1:00 p.m.	Western Carolina*	No. 23	Sanford Stadium; Athens, GA	CSS	W 45–16	92,746	
September 22	7:45 p.m.	at No. 16 Alabama	No. 22	Bryant–Denny Stadium; Tuscaloosa, AL (rivalry, College GameDay)	ESPN	W 26–23 ^{OT}	92,138	
September 29	1:00 p.m.	Ole Miss	No. 15	Sanford Stadium; Athens, GA	LFS	W 45–17	92,746	
October 6	3:30 p.m.	at Tennessee	No. 12	Neyland Stadium; Knoxville, TN (rivalry)	CBS	L 14–35	107,052	
October 13	6:00 p.m.	at Vanderbilt	No. 24	Vanderbilt Stadium; Nashville, TN (rivalry)	ESPN2	W 20–17	39,773	
October 27	3:30 p.m.	vs. No. 9 Florida	No. 20	Jacksonville Municipal Stadium; Jacksonville, FL (rivalry)	CBS	W 42–30	84,481	
November 3	1:00 p.m.	Troy*^{†}	No. 10	Sanford Stadium; Athens, GA	LFS	W 44–34	92,746	
November 10	3:30 p.m.	No. 18 Auburn	No. 10	Sanford Stadium; Athens, GA (Deep South's Oldest Rivalry)	CBS	W 45–20	92,746	
November 17	12:30 p.m.	No. 22 Kentucky	No. 8	Sanford Stadium; Athens, GA	LFS	W 24–13	92,746	
November 24	3:30 p.m.	at Georgia Tech*	No. 6	Bobby Dodd Stadium; Atlanta, GA (Clean, Old-Fashioned Hate)	ABC	W 31–17	54,990	
January 1, 2008	8:30 p.m.	vs. No. 10 Hawaii*	No. 4	Louisiana Superdome; New Orleans, LA (Sugar Bowl)	FOX	W 41–10	74,383	
*Non-conference game; ^{†}Homecoming; Rankings from AP Poll released prior to the game; All times are in Eastern time

== Rankings ==
Ranking movements Legend: ██ Increase in ranking ██ Decrease in ranking ( ) = First-place votes
	Week															
Poll	Pre	1	2	3	4	5	6	7	8	9	10	11	12	13	14	Final
AP	13	11	23	22	15	12	24	21	20	10	10	8	6	4	4 (1)	2 (3)
Coaches	13	12	25	21	16	11	23	21	20	10	10	8	6	4	4	3
Harris	Not released				15	12	23	20	19	12	11	9	7	4	4 (1)	Not released
BCS	Not released							20	18	10	10	9	7	4	5	Not released

== Preseason ==
Two key players from the 2006 season, defensive end Charles Johnson and running back Danny Ware, decided to leave school early to enter the NFL draft. Another junior, defensive back Paul Oliver, considered a move to the NFL, but decided to return to the Bulldogs for his senior year. Despite coming back for his senior year, Oliver became academically ineligible and decided to enter the supplemental draft. The Bulldogs were led on offense by rising sophomore quarterback Matthew Stafford. Sean Bailey and Mohammed Massaquoi led the receivers with Thomas Brown at running back. The defense saw the emergence of Asher Allen and Kelin Johnson in the secondary. In addition, Dannell Ellerbe was the leader of the linebackers while Geno Atkins and Jeff Owens anchored the defensive line.

== Game summaries ==
=== Oklahoma State ===
Oklahoma State at #13 Georgia

Team	1	2	3	4	Total
Oklahoma State	7	7	0	0	14
• Georgia	14	7	7	7	35

- Date: Saturday, September 1
- Location: Sanford Stadium, Athens, Georgia
- Game start: 6:45 p.m.

Sophomore quarterback Matthew Stafford threw for 234 yards and two touchdowns as the Bulldogs cruised past the Cowboys from the Big 12 in a much-hyped season opener. Georgia won its first game of the season for an 11th consecutive season.

Scoring summary

Quarter	Time	Drive			Team	Scoring information	Score	
Quarter	Time	Plays	Yards	TOP	Team	Scoring information	OSU	UGA
1	14:01	1	14		Georgia	Thomas Brown 14-yard run (Brandon Coutu kick)	0	7
1	8:45	4	47		Oklahoma St	Adarius Bowman 20-yard pass from Bobby Reid (Jason Ricks kick)	7	7
1	0:19	10	70		Georgia	Brannan Southerland 2-yard run (Brandon Coutu kick)	7	14
2	9:43	9	77		Georgia	Thomas Brown 20-yard run (Brandon Coutu kick)	7	21
2	5:43	11	75		Oklahoma St	Dantrell Savage 5-yard run (Jason Ricks kick)	14	21
3	9:43	9	72		Georgia	Bruce Figgins 11-yard pass from Matthew Stafford (Brandon Coutu kick)	14	28
4	11:11	4	24		Georgia	Michael Moore 9-yard pass from Matthew Stafford (Brandon Coutu kick)	14	35
"TOP" = time of possession. For other American football terms, see Glossary of American football.							14	35

=== South Carolina ===
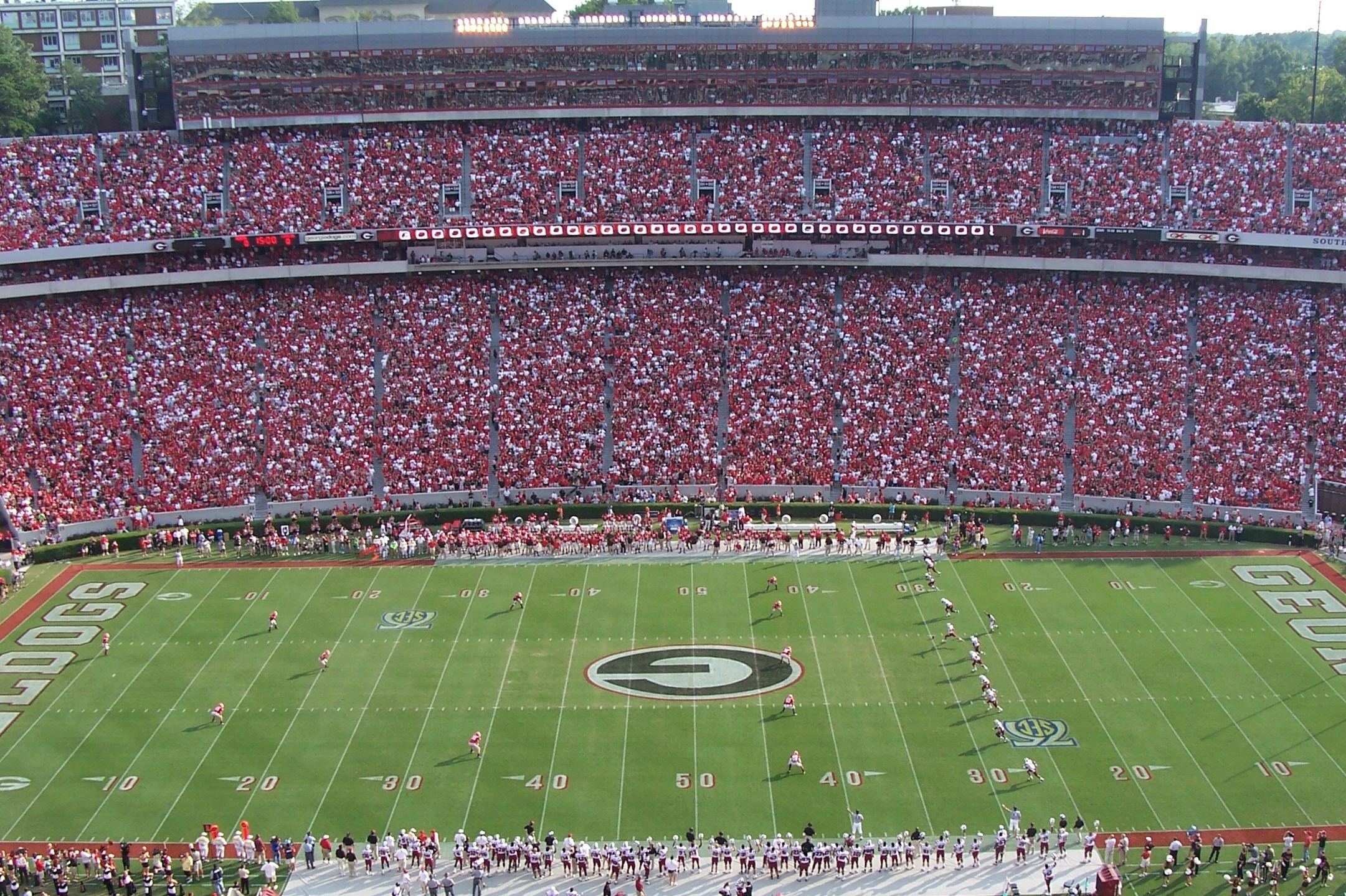
Georgia vs South Carolina, Sanford Stadium, September 2007

South Carolina at #12 Georgia

Team	1	2	3	4	Total
• South Carolina	7	3	3	3	16
Georgia	0	3	3	6	12

- Date: Saturday, September 8
- Location: Sanford Stadium, Athens, Georgia
- Game start: 5:45 p.m.

The Gamecocks took a 7-0 lead on their first drive of the game and used stifling defense to hold off the Bulldogs the rest of the way. It was Georgia's first loss in the series since 2001, and the team's fifth consecutive loss to SEC East opponents, dating back to the 2006 season.

Scoring summary

Quarter	Time	Drive			Team	Scoring information	Score	
Quarter	Time	Plays	Yards	TOP	Team	Scoring information	USC	UGA
1	3:25				South Carolina	Cory Boyd 9-yard run (Ryan Succop kick)	7	0
2	7:10				Georgia	Brandon Coutu 33-yard field goal	7	3
2	2:48				South Carolina	Ryan Succop 41-yard field goal	10	3
3	4:17				South Carolina	Ryan Succop 35-yard field goal	13	3
3	1:54				Georgia	Brandon Coutu 44-yard field goal	13	6
4	9:19				South Carolina	Ryan Succop 34-yard field goal	16	6
4	7:37				Georgia	Brandon Coutu 39-yard field goal	16	9
4	4:42				Georgia	Brandon Coutu 34-yard field goal	16	12
"TOP" = time of possession. For other American football terms, see Glossary of American football.							16	12

=== Western Carolina ===
Western Carolina at #25 Georgia

Team	1	2	3	4	Total
Western Carolina	3	6	0	7	16
• Georgia	3	21	14	7	45

- Date: Saturday, September 15
- Location: Sanford Stadium, Athens, Georgia
- Game start: 1:00 p.m.

After a slow start, the Dawgs exploded for 42 points in the final three quarters to bounce back with a win over the 1-AA Catamounts. Freshman running back Knowshon Moreno rushed for 94 yards on 13 carries.

Scoring summary

Quarter	Time	Drive			Team	Scoring information	Score	
Quarter	Time	Plays	Yards	TOP	Team	Scoring information	WCU	UGA
1	8:51				Georgia	Brandon Coutu 37-yard field goal	0	3
1	3:30				Western Carolina	Jonathan Parsons 29-yard field goal	3	3
2	12:54				Georgia	Thomas Brown 10-yard pass from Matthew Stafford (Brandon Coutu kick)	3	10
2	9:11				Western Carolina	Jonathan Parsons 40-yard field goal	6	10
2	8:04				Georgia	Sean Bailey 15-yard pass from Matthew Stafford (Brandon Coutu kick)	6	17
2	1:00				Western Carolina	Jonathan Parsons 46-yard field goal	9	17
2	0:30				Georgia	Knowshon Moreno 23-yard run (Brandon Coutu kick)	9	24
3	10:03				Georgia	Thomas Brown 4-yard run (Brandon Coutu kick)	9	31
3	1:01				Georgia	Brannan Southerland 2-yard run (Brandon Coutu kick)	9	38
4	12:53				Georgia	Demiko Goodman 34-yard pass from Joe Cox (Brandon Coutu kick)	9	45
4	4:41				Western Carolina	Mike Malone 2-yard run (Jonathan Parsons kick)	16	45
"TOP" = time of possession. For other American football terms, see Glossary of American football.							16	45

=== Alabama ===
#21 Georgia at #20 Alabama

Team	1	2	3	4	OT	Total
• Georgia	7	3	7	3	6	26
Alabama	0	3	7	10	3	23

- Date: Saturday, September 22
- Location: Bryant–Denny Stadium, Tuscaloosa, Alabama
- Game start: 7:45 p.m.
- TV announcers (ESPN): Mike Patrick

In a virtual must-win situation, the Dawgs avoided an 0-2 start in SEC play by escaping Bryant–Denny Stadium with an overtime win. Matthew Stafford connected with senior wide receiver Mikey Henderson on the Bulldogs' first play from scrimmage in OT for the winning score.

(As a footnote, this would be the last game Mark Richt won as head coach of Georgia against the Alabama Crimson Tide, as well as the last time until the 2022 College Football Playoff National Championship that UGA would defeat Alabama.)

Scoring summary

Quarter	Time	Drive			Team	Scoring information	Score	
Quarter	Time	Plays	Yards	TOP	Team	Scoring information	UGA	ALA
1	9:30				Georgia	Thomas Brown 10-yard pass from Matthew Stafford (Brandon Coutu kick)	7	0
2	6:21	10	42	4:30	Georgia	Brandon Coutu 45-yard field goal	10	0
2	0:00				Alabama	Leigh Tiffin 40-yard field goal	10	3
3	10:15				Alabama	John Parker Wilson 1-yard run (Leigh Tiffin kick)	10	10
3	6:08	9	74	4:00	Georgia	Knowshon Moreno 6-yard run (Brandon Coutu kick)	17	10
4	12:23	9	30	3:50	Georgia	Brandon Coutu 47-yard field goal	20	10
4	6:30	13	61	5:45	Alabama	Leigh Tiffin 22-yard field goal	20	13
4	1:09	10	88	3:35	Alabama	John Parker Wilson 6-yard run (Leigh Tiffin kick)	20	20
OT					Alabama	Leigh Tiffin 42-yard field goal	20	23
OT					Georgia	Mikey Henderson 25-yard pass from Matthew Stafford (no PAT attempt)	26	23
"TOP" = time of possession. For other American football terms, see Glossary of American football.							26	23

=== Ole Miss ===
Ole Miss at #16 Georgia

Team	1	2	3	4	Total
Ole Miss	7	3	7	0	17
• Georgia	0	17	7	21	45

- Date: Saturday, September 29
- Location: Sanford Stadium, Athens, Georgia
- Game start: 1:07 p.m.

Running back Thomas Brown rushed for a career-high 180 yds and three touchdowns in the fifth straight win against Western Division opponents.

Scoring summary

Quarter	Time	Drive			Team	Scoring information	Score	
Quarter	Time	Plays	Yards	TOP	Team	Scoring information	MISS	UGA
1	10:29	8	86	3:04	Ole Miss	Mike Wallace 45-yard pass from Seth Adams (Joshua Shene kick)	7	0
2	13:07	10	96	4:38	Georgia	Thomas Brown 50-yard run (Brandon Coutu kick)	7	7
2	4:31	13	80	6:49	Georgia	Mohamed Massaquoi 5-yard pass from Matthew Stafford (Brandon Coutu kick)	7	14
2	0:59	8	58	3:32	Ole Miss	Joshua Shene 30-yard field goal	10	14
2	0:00	7	54	0:59	Georgia	Brandon Coutu 20-yard field goal	10	17
3	5:53	18	84	9:07	Ole Miss	BenJarvus Green-Ellis 2-yard run (Joshua Shene kick)	17	17
3	3:30	7	80	2:23	Georgia	Thomas Brown 4-yard run (Brandon Coutu kick)	17	24
4	13:52	2	48	0:58	Georgia	Thomas Brown 41-yard run (Brandon Coutu kick)	17	31
4	11:40	3	22	1:17	Georgia	Knowshon Moreno 8-yard run (Brandon Coutu kick)	17	38
4	0:44	14	80	6:03	Georgia	Fred Munzenmaier 6-yard run (Brandon Coutu kick)	17	45
"TOP" = time of possession. For other American football terms, see Glossary of American football.							17	45

=== Tennessee ===
#11 Georgia at Tennessee

Team	1	2	3	4	Total
Georgia	0	0	7	7	14
• Tennessee	7	21	7	0	35

- Date: Saturday, October 6
- Location: Neyland Stadium, Knoxville, Tennessee
- Game start: 3:34 p.m.

Georgia suffered its worst loss since the 2003 Southeastern Conference championship, a 34-13 loss to LSU, and coach Mark Richt's first loss at Tennessee. The Bulldogs had won their last three games at Neyland, Tennessee's home stadium.

Scoring summary

Quarter	Time	Drive			Team	Scoring information	Score	
Quarter	Time	Plays	Yards	TOP	Team	Scoring information	UGA	TEN
1	8:44	12	81	5:09	Tennessee	Arian Foster 9-yard run (Daniel Lincoln kick)	0	7
2	14:50	2	57	0:35	Tennessee	LaMarcus Coker 56-yard pass from Lucas Taylor (Daniel Lincoln kick)	0	14
2	9:24	7	18	3:43	Tennessee	Montario Hardesty 10-yard run (Daniel Lincoln kick)	0	21
2	6:41	4	65	1:32	Tennessee	Arian Foster 22-yard run (Daniel Lincoln kick)	0	28
3	9:39	7	74	3:01	Georgia	Demiko Goodman 26-yard pass from Matthew Stafford (Brandon Coutu kick)	7	28
3	2:29	13	65	7:10	Tennessee	Arian Foster 4-yard run (Daniel Lincoln kick)	7	35
4	6:05	13	86	4:05	Georgia	Tripp Chandler 2-yard pass from Matthew Stafford (Brandon Coutu kick)	14	35
"TOP" = time of possession. For other American football terms, see Glossary of American football.							14	35

=== Vanderbilt ===
#23 Georgia at Vanderbilt

Team	1	2	3	4	Total
• Georgia	7	0	7	6	20
Vanderbilt	3	14	0	0	17

- Date: Saturday, October 13
- Location: Vanderbilt Stadium, Nashville, Tennessee
- Game start: 6:00 p.m.

Senior kicker Brandon Coutu drilled a 37-yard field goal as time expired to give Georgia its second road win of the season, both coming on the game's final play. The Dawgs outscored Vanderbilt 13-0 in the second half to rally from a 17-7 halftime deficit.

Scoring summary

Quarter	Time	Drive			Team	Scoring information	Score	
Quarter	Time	Plays	Yards	TOP	Team	Scoring information	UGA	VAN
1	8:13	1	33	0:08	Georgia	Sean Bailey 32-yard pass from Matthew Stafford (Brandon Coutu kick)	7	0
1	1:05	14	68	7:08	Vanderbilt	Bryan Hahnfeldt 21-yard field goal	7	3
2	9:09	7	80	3:09	Vanderbilt	Sean Walker 15-yard run (Bryan Hahnfeldt kick)	7	10
2	2:36	5	50	1:46	Vanderbilt	Sean Walker 16-yard pass from Mackenzi Adams (Bryan Hahnfeldt kick)	7	17
3	10:51	8	70	4:09	Georgia	Brannan Southerland 1-yard run (Brandon Coutu kick)	14	17
4	6:12	7	38	3:04	Georgia	Brandon Coutu 31-yard field goal	17	17
4	0:00	10	74	2:43	Georgia	Brandon Coutu 37-yard field goal	20	17
"TOP" = time of possession. For other American football terms, see Glossary of American football.							20	17

=== Florida ===
#19 Georgia vs. #11 Florida

Team	1	2	3	4	Total
• Georgia	14	7	7	14	42
Florida	7	10	7	6	30

- Date: Saturday, October 27
- Location: Jacksonville Municipal Stadium, Jacksonville, Florida
- Game start: 3:30 p.m.
- TV announcers (CBS): Verne Lundquist, Gary Danielson & Tracy Wolfson

Behind Knowshon Moreno's 188 yards (3 touchdowns) and Stafford's 223 yards passing (3 touchdowns), the Dawgs ended their hex against the rival Gators, who had won 15 of the last 17 games in the series. The game was notable for an all team end-zone celebration following Georgia's first touchdown scored on their opening drive. The team celebration was penalized twice and set the tone for a hard fought game.

Scoring summary

Quarter	Time	Drive			Team	Scoring information	Score	
Quarter	Time	Plays	Yards	TOP	Team	Scoring information	UGA	FLA
1	6:00	9	67	4:54	Georgia	Knowshon Moreno 1-yard run (Brandon Coutu kick)	7	0
1	4:39	3	67	1:21	Florida	Louis Murphy 40-yard pass from Tim Tebow (Joey Ijjas kick)	7	7
1	3:40	2	82	0:59	Georgia	Mohamed Massaquoi 84-yard pass from Matthew Stafford (Brandon Coutu kick)	14	7
2	14:41				Florida	Wondy Pierre-Louis 25-yard interception return (Joey Ijjas kick)	14	14
2	7:11	7	52	3:22	Florida	Joey Ijjas 43-yard field goal	14	17
2	1:48	10	65	5:23	Georgia	Knowshon Moreno 10-yard run (Brandon Coutu kick)	21	17
3	12:02	7	69	2:58	Georgia	Brannan Southerland 1-yard pass from Matthew Stafford (Brandon Coutu kick)	28	17
3	7:22	10	66	4:40	Florida	Tim Tebow 2-yard run (Joey Ijjas kick)	28	24
4	11:03	2	72	0:38	Georgia	Mikey Henderson 53-yard pass from Matthew Stafford (Brandon Coutu kick)	35	24
4	9:40	4	44	1:23	Florida	Tim Tebow 3-yard run (pass failed)	35	30
4	3:54	11	68	5:46	Georgia	Knowshon Moreno 3-yard run (Brandon Coutu kick)	42	30
"TOP" = time of possession. For other American football terms, see Glossary of American football.							42	30

=== Troy ===
Troy at #10 Georgia

Team	1	2	3	4	Total
Troy	10	0	10	14	34
• Georgia	7	17	10	10	44

- Date: Saturday, November 3
- Location: Sanford Stadium, Athens, Georgia
- Game start: 1:00 p.m.

Knowshon Moreno had another huge game, rushing for 196 yards and three touchdowns, as the Bulldogs avoided a post-Florida hangover with a 10-point win over the pesky Trojans from the Sun Belt.

Scoring summary

Quarter	Time	Drive			Team	Scoring information	Score	
Quarter	Time	Plays	Yards	TOP	Team	Scoring information	TROY	UGA
1	13:11	5	18	1:32	Troy	Greg Whibbs 25-yard field goal	3	0
1	10:12	1	80	0:15	Georgia	Knowshon Moreno 80-yard run (Brandon Coutu kick)	3	7
1	4:47	4	80	0:45	Troy	Jerrel Jernigan 32-yard pass from Omar Haugabook (Greg Whibbs kick)	10	7
2	14:45	8	29	2:31	Georgia	Brandon Coutu 36-yard field goal	10	10
2	0:45	3	52	1:08	Georgia	Tripp Chandler 22-yard pass from Matthew Stafford (Brandon Coutu kick)	10	17
2	0:00	5	43	0:35	Georgia	Sean Bailey 20-yard pass from Matthew Stafford (Brandon Coutu kick)	10	24
3	10:16	13	66	4:44	Troy	Greg Whibbs 19-yard field goal	13	24
3	5:29	5	80	1:55	Troy	Kennard Burton 44-yard pass from Omar Haugabook (Greg Whibbs kick)	20	24
3	2:03	7	38	3:26	Georgia	Brandon Coutu 46-yard field goal	20	27
3	1:08	1	14	0:04	Georgia	Knowshon Moreno 1-yard run (Brandon Coutu kick)	20	34
4	12:54	8	63	3:14	Troy	Omar Haugabook 1-yard run (Greg Whibbs kick)	27	34
4	8:53	7	29	4:01	Georgia	Brandon Coutu 26-yard field goal	27	37
4	6:32	2	2	0:30	Georgia	Knowshon Moreno 1-yard run (Brandon Coutu kick)	27	44
4	0:05	12	91	2:56	Troy	Jerrel Jernigan 5-yard pass from Jamie Hampton (Greg Whibbs kick)	34	44
"TOP" = time of possession. For other American football terms, see Glossary of American football.							34	44

=== Auburn ===
#17 Auburn Tigers (7–3) at #10 Georgia Bulldogs (7–2)

Quarter	1	2	3	4	Total
Auburn	3	7	10	0	20
Georgia	10	7	14	14	45

at Sanford Stadium • Athens, Georgia

- Date: November 10
- Game time: 3:30 p.m. EDT
- Game weather: Sunny • 64 °F (18 °C) • Wind 5 miles per hour (8.0 km/h; 4.3 kn)
- Game attendance: 92,746
- Referee: Penn Wagers
- TV announcers (CBS): Verne Lundquist & Gary Danielson
- Box Score

Game information

Auburn

- Brandon Cox
  14/30, 133 Yds, TD, 4 INT
- Ben Tate
  13 Rush, 58 Yds, TD
- Cole Bennett
  2 Rec, 32 Yds

Georgia

- Matthew Stafford
  11/19, 237 Yds, 2 TD, INT
- Knowshon Moreno
  22 Rush, 101 Yds, 2 TD
- Sean Bailey
  4 Rec, 96 Yds, TD

Georgia had their way in The Deep South's Oldest Rivalry for the second consecutive year behind a balanced offensive attack, with 237 yards passing from Matthew Stafford and 180 combined yards on the ground. The Tigers allowed their most points in a game for the entire season to Georgia for the third straight year. It was also the first game in which the Bulldogs wore their black jerseys.

Scoring summary

Quarter	Time	Drive			Team	Scoring information	Score	
Quarter	Time	Plays	Yards	TOP	Team	Scoring information	AUB	UGA
1	11:28	10	26	3:22	Georgia	32-yard field goal by Brandon Coutu	0	3
1	4:46	12	68	6:42	Auburn	22-yard field goal by Wes Byrum	3	3
1	3:09	5	72	1:37	Georgia	Mohamed Massaquoi 58-yard touchdown reception from Matthew Stafford, Brandon Coutu kick good	3	10
2	10:54	11	68	4:52	Georgia	Sean Bailey 15-yard touchdown reception from Matthew Stafford, Brandon Coutu kick good	3	17
2	6:13	8	65	4:41	Auburn	Ben Tate 7-yard touchdown run, Wes Byrum kick good	10	17
3	12:19	4	27	1:42	Auburn	Mario Fannin 12-yard touchdown reception from Brandon Cox, Wes Byrum kick good	17	17
3	6:47	11	45	3:57	Auburn	33-yard field goal by Wes Byrum	20	17
3	5:00	4	68	1:47	Georgia	Knowshon Moreno 24-yard touchdown run, Brandon Coutu kick good	20	24
3	0:00	6	48	3:17	Georgia	Knowshon Moreno 3-yard touchdown run, Brandon Coutu kick good	20	31
4	12:11	3	65	1:27	Georgia	Brannan Coutherland 1-yard touchdown run, Brandon Coutu kick good	20	38
						Thomas Brown 1-yard touchdown run, Brandon Coutu kick good	20	45
"TOP" = time of possession. For other American football terms, see Glossary of American football.							20	45

=== Kentucky ===
#20 Kentucky at #9 Georgia

Team	1	2	3	4	Total
Kentucky	10	0	3	0	13
• Georgia	0	7	14	3	24

- Date: Saturday, November 17
- Location: Sanford Stadium, Athens, Georgia
- Game start: 12:30 p.m.

The Dawgs had to shake off the rust after falling behind 10-0 early and did just that by scoring 24 of the game's final 27 points to complete the SEC schedule at 6-2. Georgia ran their winning streak over the Wildcats in Athens to 15 games.

Scoring summary

Quarter	Time	Drive			Team	Scoring information	Score	
Quarter	Time	Plays	Yards	TOP	Team	Scoring information	UK	UGA
1	7:11	7	80	2:31	Kentucky	Keenan Burton 36-yard pass from Andre' Woodson (Lones Seiber kick)	7	0
1	0:57	12	42	4:51	Kentucky	Lones Seiber 31-yard field goal	10	0
2	0:40	13	80	4:26	Georgia	Knowshon Moreno 1-yard run (Brandon Coutu kick)	10	7
3	10:49	6	19	3:16	Georgia	Thomas Brown 1-yard run (Brandon Coutu kick)	10	14
3	5:40	7	53	3:16	Georgia	Matthew Stafford 10-yard run (Brandon Coutu kick)	10	21
3	4:27	6	44	1:05	Kentucky	Lones Seiber 44-yard field goal	13	21
4	2:09	7	16	2:22	Georgia	Brandon Coutu 46-yard field goal	13	24
"TOP" = time of possession. For other American football terms, see Glossary of American football.							13	24

=== Georgia Tech ===
#7 Georgia at Georgia Tech

Team	1	2	3	4	Total
• Georgia	3	13	7	8	31
Georgia Tech	0	14	0	3	17

- Date: Saturday, November 24
- Location: Bobby Dodd Stadium, Atlanta
- Game start: 3:30 p.m.

Georgia tied a school-record with its seventh-consecutive win in the series of their rivals from Atlanta. Thomas Brown ran for 139 yards, unlike Moreno, who struggled and left the game with an ankle injury. The Georgia defense allowed just 12 completions on 32 pass attempts by the Yellow Jackets.

Scoring summary

Quarter	Time	Drive			Team	Scoring information	Score	
Quarter	Time	Plays	Yards	TOP	Team	Scoring information	UGA	GT
1	0:58	12	49	5:22	Georgia	Brandon Coutu 45-yard field goal	3	0
2	12:27	6	47	2:20	Georgia Tech	Tashard Choice 12-yard run (Travis Bell kick)	3	7
2	9:26	7	67	2:53	Georgia	Matthew Stafford 31-yard run (Brandon Coutu kick)	10	7
2	2:00	8	61	3:22	Georgia Tech	Colin Peek 17-yard pass from Taylor Bennett (Travis Bell kick)	10	14
2	1:02	6	77	0:51	Georgia	Mohamed Massaquoi 9-yard pass from Matthew Stafford (pass failed)	16	14
3	1:40	4	80	1:20	Georgia	Brannan Southerland 3-yard run (Andy Bailey kick)	23	14
4	14:10	6	49	2:22	Georgia Tech	Travis Bell 44-yard field goal	23	17
4	11:07	6	71	2:56	Georgia	Thomas Brown 32-yard run (Matthew Stafford to Kenneth Harris pass)	31	17
"TOP" = time of possession. For other American football terms, see Glossary of American football.							31	17

=== Hawaii—Sugar Bowl ===
#10 Hawaii vs. #5 Georgia

Team	1	2	3	4	Total
Hawaii	3	0	0	7	10
• Georgia	14	10	14	3	41

- Date: Tuesday, January 1
- Location: Louisiana Superdome, New Orleans
- Game start: 8:30 p.m.
- Game weather: dome
- TV announcers (FOX): Thom Brennaman & Charles Davis

Georgia controlled both sides of the line of scrimmage and completely outmanned the undefeated Western Athletic Conference champs from the beginning of the game to the end. The Bulldogs' previously unheralded defensive end Marcus Howard dominated the Warrior offensive line and was named the game's Most Valuable Player. This is only the second time a defensive player has been named MVP in the Sugar Bowl's history. The last defensive player to be named MVP was Walt Yowarsky, who played tackle for Kentucky, in 1951.

Scoring summary

Quarter	Time	Drive			Team	Scoring information	Score	
Quarter	Time	Plays	Yards	TOP	Team	Scoring information	HAW	UGA
1	9:42	9	62	4:09	Georgia	Knowshon Moreno 17-yard run (Brandon Coutu kick)	0	7
1	4:20	11	42	5:22	Hawaii	Daniel Kelly 41-yard field goal	3	7
1	0:57	7	65	3:23	Georgia	Knowshon Moreno 11-yard run (Brandon Coutu kick)	3	14
2	9:36	10	20	4:48	Georgia	Brandon Coutu 52-yard field goal	3	17
2	8:00	4	42	1:25	Georgia	Sean Bailey 11-yard pass from Matthew Stafford (Brandon Coutu kick)	3	24
3	8:57				Georgia	Marcus Howard recovered fumble in end zone (Brandon Coutu kick)	3	31
3	1:40	6	50	2:15	Georgia	Thomas Brown 1-yard run (Brandon Coutu kick)	3	38
4	14:32	7	28	0:51	Georgia	Brandon Coutu 32-yard field goal	3	41
4	10:32	9	65	4:00	Hawaii	Ryan Grice-Mullen 16-yard pass from Tyler Graunke (Daniel Kelly kick)	10	41
"TOP" = time of possession. For other American football terms, see Glossary of American football.							10	41

== Final ranking ==
The Associated Press final poll lists the Bulldogs ranked 2nd (behind national champion LSU) - the highest ranking since December 6, 1982, and the highest final season ranking since the National Championship year of 1980. Buoyed by three first place votes, the Bulldogs barely outpaced the third ranked USC program. 2007 marks the eleventh consecutive final AP poll which the Bulldogs ranked in the top 25, the current longest active streak. The Bulldogs have been ranked 30 times in the final poll including 14 Top-10 and 9 Top-5 rankings.

The final USA Today poll listed the Bulldogs ranked 3rd (behind LSU and USC) – which ties the highest ranking ever in that poll (set in the final 2002 poll).

== Personnel ==
=== Coaching staff ===
The 2007 season was Richt's seventh season at Georgia. Neil Callaway, Georgia's offensive coordinator from 2001 to 2006, left at the end of 2006 to become the head coach at University of Alabama at Birmingham. Richt named former UGA quarterback Mike Bobo as the new offensive coordinator. Bobo took over play calling responsibilities during the Georgia Tech game as well as in the 2006 Chick-fil-A Bowl. Callaway also served as the offensive line coach. Stacy Searels, offensive line coach at LSU from 2003 to 2006, was named to the same position at Georgia to replace Callaway.

=== Roster ===
2007 Georgia Bulldogs by Position
Quarterbacks: 7 Matthew Stafford – Sophomore; 14 Joe Cox – (redshirt) Sophomore; 15 Blake Barnes – Junior; 16 Charles Stanford II; 17 Jonathan deLaureal – (redshirt) Freshman; 19 Logan Gray – Freshman; Running backs: 6 Kregg Lumpkin – Senior; 20 Thomas Brown – Senior; 22 Caleb King – Freshman; 23 Corry Parker – (redshirt) Freshman; 24 Knowshon Moreno – (redshirt) Freshman; 33 Kalvin Daniels – Freshman; 37 Cortney Newmans – Freshman; 29 Cedric Lang – " (redshirt) Freshman"; 39 Jason Johnson – Senior; Fullbacks: 35 Nick Stiles – Freshman; 36 Brannan Southerland – Junior; 48 Fred Munzenmaier – (redshirt) Freshman; 49 Shaun Chapas – (redshirt) Freshman; Wide receivers: 1 Mohamed Massaquoi – Junior; 4 Sean Bailey – Senior; 8 Vernon Spellman – (redshirt) Sophomore; 9 Marquise Brown – (redshirt) Freshman; 12 Percy Croffie – Senior; 16 Kris Durham – Sophomore; 18 A.J. Bryant – Senior; 26 Tony Wilson – (redshirt) Freshman; 27 Mikey Henderson – Senior; 28 Israel Troupe – Freshman; 80 Walter Hill – Freshman; 82 Michael Moore – (redshirt) Sophomore; 83 T.J. Gartrell – Senior; 84 Zach Renner – Freshman; 85 Demiko Goodman – Junior; 87 Aron White – Freshman; 88 Kenneth Harris – Junior; Tight ends: 46 Jeff Potterbaum – (redshirt) Sophomore; 81 NaDerris Ward – (redshirt) Freshman; 84 Casey Nickels – (redshirt) Freshman; 84 Coleman Watson – Senior; 86 Tripp Chandler – Junior; 89 Bruce Figgins – Freshman	Offensive line: 44 Josh Sailors – Freshman; 54 Tanner Strickland – Freshman; 60 Clint Boling – Freshman; 61 John Potts – Freshman; 63 Chris Davis – (redshirt) Freshman; 66 Micky White – (redshirt) Freshman; 67 Chester Adams – Senior; 70 Scott Haverkamp – Junior; 72 Vince Vance – Sophomore; 73 Chris Little – Freshman; 74 Kevin Perez – (redshirt) Freshman; 75 Fernando Velasco – Senior; 76 Ben Harden – Freshman; 77 Trinton Sturdivant – Freshman; 78 Josh Davis – (redshirt) Freshman; Defensive line: 38 Marcus Howard – Senior; 41 Roderick Battle – (redshirt) Sophomore; 45 Tripp Taylor – Sophomore; 55 Jeremy Lomax – Junior; 56 Geno Atkins – Sophomore; 58 Demarcus Dobbs – (redshirt) Freshman; 59 Michael Lemon – (redshirt) Freshman; 64 Kiante Tripp – (redshirt) Freshman; 67 Chester Adams – Senior; 68 Wes Jacobs – (redshirt) Sophomore; 69 Andrew Gully – (redshirt) Sophomore; 73 Shawn Biron - “Senior”; 71 Justin Lyles – Senior; 79 Justin Anderson – Freshman; 90 Corvey Irvin – Junior; 91 Kade Weston – (redshirt) Sophomore; 92 Neland Ball – Freshman; 93 David White – (redshirt) Freshman; 95 Jeff Owens – Junior; 97 Brandon Wood – (redshirt) Freshman; 98 Ricardo Crawford – (redshirt) Freshman; 99 Jarius Wynn – Junior	Linebackers: 12 Brandon Miller – Senior; 29 Ryan Rearden – (redshirt) Freshman; 33 Dannell Ellerbe – Junior; 35 Rennie Curran – Freshman; 37 Mitchell Pittman – Senior; 42 Justin Houston – Freshman; 43 Charles White – Freshman; 44 Marcus Washington – Junior; 46 Ukoha Kalu – Freshman; 49 Patrick Williams – Senior; 50 Darryl Gamble – (redshirt) Freshman; 51 Akeem Dent – (redshirt) Freshman; 52 Darius Dewberry – Sophomore; 53 Chris Gaunder – Senior; 54 Justin Respress – (redshirt) Freshman; 57 Benjamin Boyd – Junior; 61 Justin Fields – (redshirt) Freshman; 65 Will Sullivan – (redshirt) Freshman; Defensive backs: 8 Eric Elliot – Freshman; 25 Vance Cuff – Freshman; 27 Molloy VanGorder – Freshman; Cornerbacks: 2 Asher Allen – Sophomore; 3 Bryan Evans – (redshirt) Sophomore; 10 Donavon Baldwin – (redshirt) Sophomore; 11 Ramarcus Brown – Junior; 16 Chad Gloer – (redshirt) Freshman; 23 Prince Miller – Sophomore; 26 Christian Norton – (redshirt) Freshman; 29 Thomas Flowers – Senior	Safeties: 4 Andrew Johnson – (redshirt) Freshman; 5 CJ Byrd – Junior; 9 Reshad Jones – (redshirt) Freshman; 15 Rowdy Francis – Junior; 17 Antavious Coates – (redshirt) Sophomore; 18 Brad Arsenault – (redshirt) Junior; 24 Robby Bost – (redshirt) Sophomore; 30 Kelin Johnson – Senior; 31 Quintin Banks – (redshirt) Freshman; 32 John Knox – Freshman; 47 Andrew Williams – Senior; Punters: 13 Drew Butler – Freshman; 32 Brian Mimbs – Junior; 95 Chris Rogers – Freshman; Kickers: 22 Bo Stansell – (redshirt) Freshman; 28 Ben Wilson – Senior; 93 Andy Bailey – Senior; 96 Brandon Coutu – Senior; Long snappers: 57 Andrew Davis – Freshman; 58 Matthew DeGenova – Freshman; 59 Bo Fowler – Junior; 65 Jeff Henson – Junior
