= 2008 Sugar Bowl =

2008 Allstate Sugar Bowl
- BCS Bowl Game; 74th Sugar Bowl
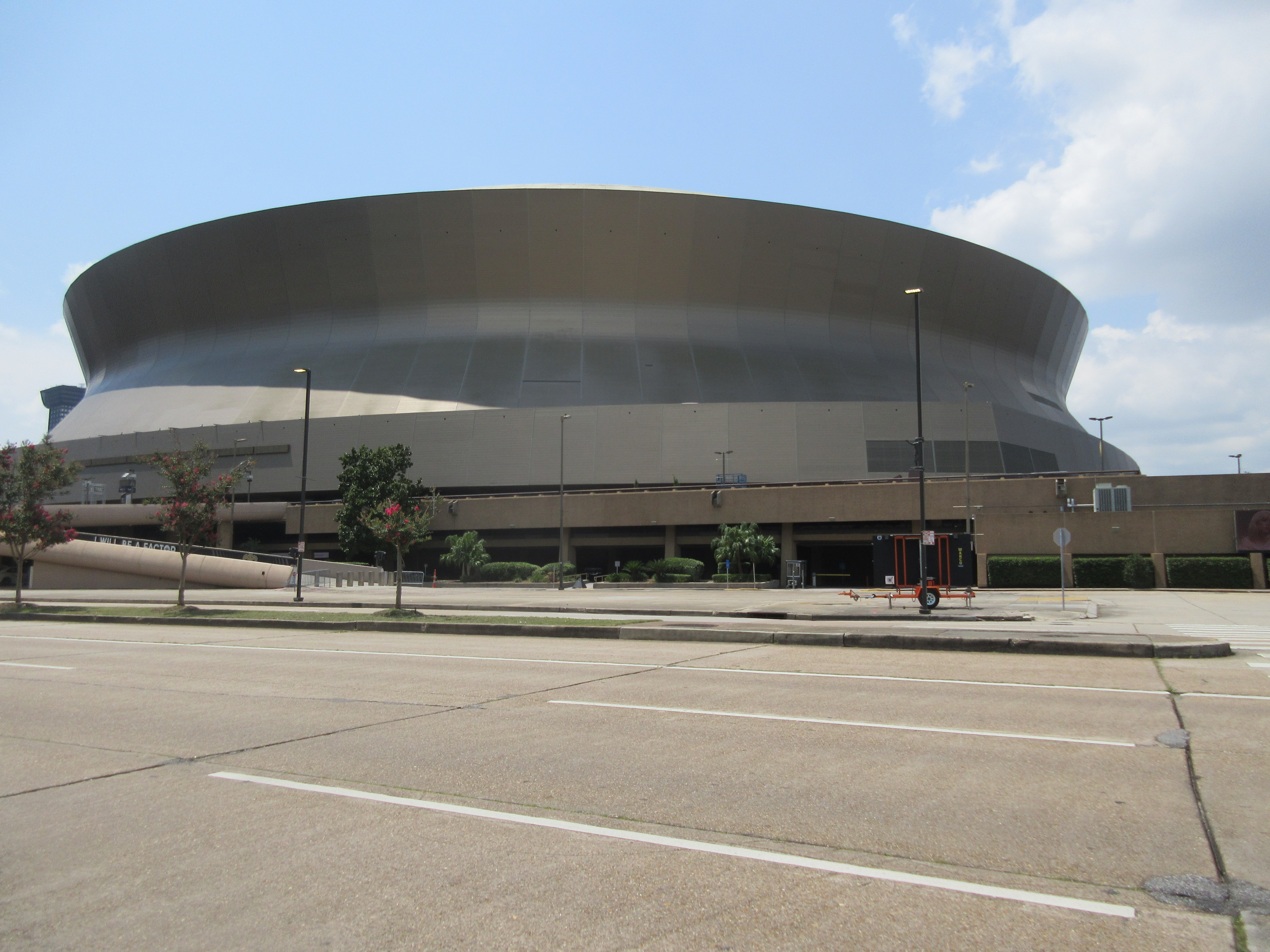
- The Louisiana Superdome in New Orleans, Louisiana, hosted the Sugar Bowl.
Hawaii Warriors	Georgia Bulldogs
(12–0)	(10–2)
WAC	SEC
10	41
Head coach: June Jones	Head coach: Mark Richt
AP / Coaches / BCS; 10 / 10 / 10	AP / Coaches / BCS; 4 / 4 / 5
	1	2	3	4	Total
Hawaii	3	0	0	7	10
Georgia	14	10	14	3	41
- Date: January 1, 2008
- Season: 2007
- Stadium: Louisiana Superdome
- Location: New Orleans, Louisiana
- MVP: Georgia DE Marcus Howard
- Favorite: Georgia by 9½
- National anthem: Bonerama
- Referee: Brian O'Cain (Pac-10)
- Halftime show: Both school bands, AllState Sugar Bowl Band
- Attendance: 74,383
- Payout: US$17 million per team

United States TV coverage
- Network: FOX
- Announcers: Thom Brennaman, Charles Davis, and Chris Myers
- Nielsen ratings: 7.9

The 2008 Allstate Sugar Bowl was an American college football bowl game. It was part of the Bowl Championship Series (BCS) for the 2007 NCAA Division I FBS football season, and was the 74th Sugar Bowl. It was played on Tuesday January 1, 2008, in the Louisiana Superdome in New Orleans.

The Warriors were the third team not in any of the six BCS conferences (not counting major independent Notre Dame) to play in a BCS game. Boise State qualified for the 2007 Fiesta Bowl, and Utah made the same game two years earlier. Both teams won their respective games.

Georgia earned a 41–10 win. It was already a one-sided affair at halftime with a 24–3 score and it was 41–3 at one point early in the fourth quarter. The closest Hawaii got was 7–3 after a Dan Kelly field goal.

== Teams ==
Because the SEC champion (LSU) was slated to participate in the BCS National Championship Game, the number-five Georgia Bulldogs were selected to host the number-ten, WAC champion Hawaii Warriors, the last undefeated major college football team going into the bowl season. This was the first meeting between the two teams.

=== Hawaii ===
The Hawaii Warriors, led by 9th-year head coach June Jones, finished the regular season 12–0, the program's first perfect regular season, winning the WAC title for the 3rd time in program history, and the Warriors' first ever outright conference title. The Warriors were led by senior quarterback Colt Brennan, who broke several FBS records throughout the season, including career passing touchdowns and total career touchdowns. Hawaii started the season ranked no. 23 in the AP poll and only played one ranked team in the regular season, defeating no. 17 Boise State 39–27 in the penultimate game of the regular season.

=== Georgia ===
The Georgia Bulldogs, led by 7th-year head coach Mark Richt, finished the regular season 10–2 (6–2 in SEC play), finishing tied for 1st in the SEC's Eastern Division, but lost out on an appearance in the SEC Championship Game to Tennessee due to tiebreakers. The Bulldogs started the season ranked no. 13 in the AP poll, but a 12–16 loss to South Carolina in week 2 saw the Bulldogs fall to no. 23. Georgia would crack the top ten following a 42–30 victory over then-no. 9 Florida in week 8. Coming into the Sugar Bowl, Georgia was ranked no. 4 in both the AP and Coaches poll.

== Game summary ==
2008 Allstate Sugar Bowl
No. 10 Hawaii Warriors vs. No. 5 Georgia Bulldogs – Game summary

Quarter	1	2	3	4	Total
No. 10 Warriors	3	0	0	7	10
No. 5 Bulldogs	14	10	14	3	41

at Louisiana Superdome, New Orleans, Louisiana

- Date: January 1, 2007
- Game time: 7:30 p.m. CST
- Game weather: None (played indoors)
- Game attendance: 74,383
- Referee: Brian O'Cain
- TV announcers (Fox): Thom Brennaman, Charles Davis, and Chris Myers
- Box score

Game information
First quarter
- UGA – Knowshon Moreno 17-yard run (Brandon Coutu kick), 9:42. Bulldogs 7–0. Drive: 9 plays, 61 yards, 4:09.
- HAW – Dan Kelly 41-yard field goal, 4:20. Bulldogs 7–3. Drive: 11 plays, 42 yards, 5:22.
- UGA – Knowshon Moreno 11-yard run (Brandon Coutu kick), 0:57. Bulldogs 14–3. Drive: 7 plays, 65 yards, 3:23.

Second quarter

- UGA – Brandon Coutu 52-yard field goal, 9:36. Bulldogs 17–3. Drive: 10 plays, 20 yards, 4:48.
- UGA – Sean Bailey 11-yard pass from Matthew Stafford (Brandon Coutu kick), 8:00. Bulldogs 24–3. Drive: 4 plays, 42 yards, 1:25.

Third quarter

- UGA – Marcus Howard 0-yard fumble return (Brandon Coutu kick), 8:57. Bulldogs 31–3.
- UGA – Thomas Brown 1-yard run (Brandon Coutu kick), 1:40. Bulldogs 38–3. Drive: 6 plays, 50 yards, 2:15.

Fourth quarter

- UGA – Brandon Coutu 45-yard field goal, 14:32. Bulldogs 41–3. Drive: 7 plays, 28 yards, 0:58.
- HAW – Ryan Grice-Mullen 16-yard pass from Tyler Graunke (Dan Kelly kick), 10:32. Bulldogs 41–10. Drive: 9 plays, 65 yards, 4:00.

Statistics	HAW	UGA
First downs	20	19
Total yards	306	335
Rushing yards	-5	160
Passing yards	311	175
Passing: comp–att–int	35–57–4	14–27–1
Turnovers	6	1
Time of possession	30:39	29:21

Team	Category	Player	Statistics
Hawaii	Passing	Colt Brennan	22/38, 169 yards, 3 INT
Hawaii	Rushing	Kealoha Pilares	7 rushes, 26 yards
Hawaii	Receiving	Jason Rivers	10 receptions, 105 yards
Georgia	Passing	Matthew Stafford	14/23, 175 yards, TD, INT
Georgia	Rushing	Thomas Brown	19 rushes, 73 yards, TD
Georgia	Receiving	Mohamed Massaquoi	5 receptions, 54 yards

== Aftermath ==
With Hawaii's defeat, the 2007-08 college football season ended with no undefeated teams, something that had not happened since the 2003-04 season. This is also the second time in the BCS era that this has occurred.

Georgia DE Marcus Howard was named the MVP of the Sugar Bowl Game, the first time in its history that a purely defensive player has received the honor.

With the win, Georgia Head Coach Mark Richt became the first head coach in Georgia history to win more than one Sugar Bowl (his previous victory was over Florida State University following the 2002 season). Vince Dooley and Wally Butts won one Sugar Bowl each, with Dooley's only win securing the 1980 National Championship. Dooley lost four other Sugar Bowl games.

On January 8, Hawaii Head Coach June Jones left Hawaii to become the head coach at Southern Methodist University. He signed a five-year contract.
