= Thomas Brown (American football coach) =

American football coach and player (born 1986)

New England Patriots
- Title: Passing game coordinator & tight ends coach

Personal information
- Born: May 15, 1986 (age 40); Tucker, Georgia, U.S.
- Listed height: 5 ft 8 in (1.73 m)
- Listed weight: 203 lb (92 kg)

Career information
- Position: Running back
- High school: Tucker
- College: Georgia (2004–2007)
- NFL draft: 2008: 6th round, 172nd overall pick

Career history

Playing
- Atlanta Falcons (2008); Cleveland Browns (2009–2010)

Coaching
- Georgia (2011) Strength and conditioning coach; Chattanooga (2012) Running backs coach; Marshall (2013) Running backs coach; Wisconsin (2014) Running backs coach; Georgia (2015) Running backs coach; Miami (FL) (2016–2018) Offensive coordinator & running backs coach; South Carolina (2019) Running backs coach; Los Angeles Rams (2020–2022); Running backs coach (2020); Assistant head coach & running backs coach (2021); Assistant head coach & tight ends coach (2022); Carolina Panthers (2023) Offensive coordinator; Chicago Bears (2024); Passing game coordinator (2024); Offensive coordinator (2024); Interim head coach (2024); New England Patriots (2025–present) Passing game coordinator & tight ends coach

Awards and highlights
- As a coach: Super Bowl champion (LVI); As a player: Freshman All-SEC (2004)

Head coaching record
- Regular season: 1–4 (.200)
- Coaching profile at Pro Football Reference
- Stats at Pro Football Reference

Thomas Brown (born May 15, 1986) is an American professional football coach and former running back who currently serves as the passing game coordinator and tight ends coach for the New England Patriots of the National Football League (NFL). Brown played college football for the Georgia Bulldogs and played professionally in the NFL for the Atlanta Falcons and Cleveland Browns. He previously served as an assistant coach for several NFL and college football teams.

== Playing career ==
=== College ===
Brown was a freshman All-SEC selection in 2004 after totaling 172 carries for 875 yards and eight touchdowns as well as 16 receptions for 150 yards, amassing 1,043 all-purpose yards. He had 100-yard games against Vanderbilt Commodores, Arkansas Razorbacks, Kentucky Wildcats, and Wisconsin Badgers. In addition to his All-SEC selection, he was the recipient of the Offensive Newcomer of the Year Award and the team’s Victors Club Award.

Brown continued to be productive in his second year, starting all 12 games and leading the Bulldogs with 736 yards and four touchdowns on 147 attempts. He added 67 yards on six receptions and returned two kickoffs for 19 yards. His season-high of 146 rushing yards on 20 carries against South Carolina. A 9-yard halfback touchdown pass to quarterback Joe Tereshinski, playing for the injured D.J. Shockley, came against the Florida Gators. Brown also ran for a career-long 52-yard touchdown against West Virginia in the 2006 Nokia Sugar Bowl.

In 2006, Brown started in five of seven games while registering 62 carries for 256 yards and one touchdown and also added seven catches for 71 yards. He returned 15 kickoffs for 379 yards with a school record 99-yard kickoff return against Tennessee. He averaged 100.9 all-purpose yards per game after tallying 706 for the season. A torn ACL against Vanderbilt sidelined Brown for the rest of the season.

Brown rushed for 779 yards on 148 attempts and 10 touchdowns in his senior season at Georgia in 2007 despite sitting out for three games with a broken collarbone and splitting playing time with talented redshirt freshman Knowshon Moreno. He also caught 10 passes for 84 yards and two scores. Returned 15 kickoffs for 333 yards (22.2 avg.) while amassing 1,196 all-purpose yards, an average of 119.6 yards per game.

During his senior season, Brown was named SEC Offensive Player of the Week after running for a career-high 180 yards and three touchdowns against the University of Mississippi. Appeared in 10 games, starting in six, including the 2008 Sugar Bowl against Hawaii.

=== National Football League ===
Pre-draft measurables
Height	Weight	Arm length	Hand span	40-yard dash	10-yard split	20-yard split	20-yard shuttle	Three-cone drill	Vertical jump	Broad jump	Bench press
5 ft 8 3/8 in (1.74 m)	204 lb (93 kg)	31 in (0.79 m)	10 in (0.25 m)	4.42 s	1.49 s	2.57 s	4.19 s	7.17 s	38.5 in (0.98 m)	10 ft 8 in (3.25 m)	25 reps
All values from NFL Combine/Pro Day

==== Atlanta Falcons ====
Brown was selected by the Atlanta Falcons in the sixth round of the 2008 NFL draft with the 178th overall pick. His rookie season was cut short by a horse collar tackle during the preseason, landing him on injured reserve. He was waived prior to the following season on September 5, 2009.

==== Cleveland Browns ====
Brown was signed to the Cleveland Browns practice squad on November 10, 2009. He was promoted to the active roster on January 2, 2010 after linebacker David Veikune was placed on injured reserve. He was released June 17, 2010.

== Coaching career ==
=== Early coaching career ===
In 2012, Brown was hired as running backs coach for the Chattanooga Mocs. In 2013, Brown was hired at the same position for the Marshall Thundering Herd.

=== Wisconsin ===
On February 24, 2014, Brown was hired to be the Wisconsin Badgers running back coach. During his tenure as the running back coach, running back Melvin Gordon set the school record for single-season rushing yards, with 2,587 yards.

=== Georgia ===
On February 16, 2015, Brown returned to his alma mater as the running backs coach at University of Georgia under head coach Mark Richt, under whom Brown played. The move united the position coach of the 2014 NCAA rushing yards leader, Melvin Gordon, with one of the nation's most prolific returning running backs in Nick Chubb.

=== Miami ===
On December 30, 2015, Brown was hired to be the running backs coach and offensive coordinator at the University of Miami, where he would work under Mark Richt again.

=== South Carolina ===
On January 9, 2019, Brown was named the running backs coach at the University of South Carolina.

=== Los Angeles Rams ===
On February 12, 2020, Brown was hired by the Los Angeles Rams as their running backs coach under head coach Sean McVay. He was given the additional title of assistant head coach on February 23, 2021. Brown won Super Bowl LVI when the Rams defeated the Cincinnati Bengals 23–20. In 2022, he transitioned from running backs coach to the team’s tight ends coach while retaining the assistant head coach title.

=== Carolina Panthers ===
On February 17, 2023, Brown was hired by the Carolina Panthers as their offensive coordinator under head coach Frank Reich. On October 16, after starting 0-6, Frank Reich ceded play calling to Brown. Brown was named one of the top offensive coordinators in the league in an NFLPA poll of players.

=== Chicago Bears ===
On January 30, 2024, Brown was hired by the Chicago Bears as their pass game coordinator under head coach Matt Eberflus. He was tasked with developing rookie quarterback Caleb Williams, whom Brown had briefly met on a recruiting trip with South Carolina.

The Bears began the 2024 season 4–5, including a three-game losing streak in which the offense scored just 27 points total. Offensive coordinator Shane Waldron was fired on November 12, and Brown was elevated to the role in his place. Although losing his first game as play caller, a 20–19 loss to the Green Bay Packers, WFLD noted that Brown "didn't reinvent the wheel" while commending his strategy of "quick passes, balanc[ing] the run and pass and [scripting] plays" along with hurrying the offense to the line of scrimmage so that Williams could properly read the defense. In his three-game stint as offensive coordinator, the Bears offense scored eight touchdowns compared to just two in Waldron's final three weeks.

Despite the improved offensive production, the Bears eventually dropped to 4–8, resulting in Eberflus' dismissal on November 29. Brown was promoted again and became the first interim head coach in Bears history.

In Brown's head coaching debut, the Bears lost 38–13 to the San Francisco 49ers. Chicago then lost the next three games, including a 6–3 defeat to the Seattle Seahawks in which Brown received criticism for improperly using his timeouts and costing the Bears a chance to tie the game. The defense also declined, allowing 108 points across the four losses as it was unable to recover while the offense was struggling.

Brown's final game as interim HC concluded with a 24–22 win over the Packers on a game-winning field goal, giving him a 1–4 record in the role. He concluded his tenure by discussing how he wanted his players "to believe in themselves, to walk into this arena, this atmosphere, that we haven't won in in a very long time and capitalize the right way. I wanted our last game together to be about firsts: The first time we won in 10 games. The first time we beat these cats in (12) tries. The first win in 2025. There was a lot to play for in this game. I'm so proud of those guys the way they capitalized and finished. Also, even more so on Virginia McCaskey's birthday. To be able to get a win was a huge deal."

He was not retained by incoming head coach Ben Johnson for the 2025 season.

=== New England Patriots ===
On January 27, 2025, the New England Patriots hired Brown as their passing game coordinator and tight ends coach under the leadership of new head coach Mike Vrabel.

== Head coaching record ==
Team	Year	Regular season					Postseason			
Team	Year	Won	Lost	Ties	Win %	Finish	Won	Lost	Win %	Result
CHI	2024*	1	4	0	.200	4th in NFC North	—	—	—	—
Total		1	4	0	.200		—	—	—	

*Interim head coach

== Personal life ==
Brown and his wife, Jessica, have three children.
