= Knowshon Moreno =

American football player (born 1987)

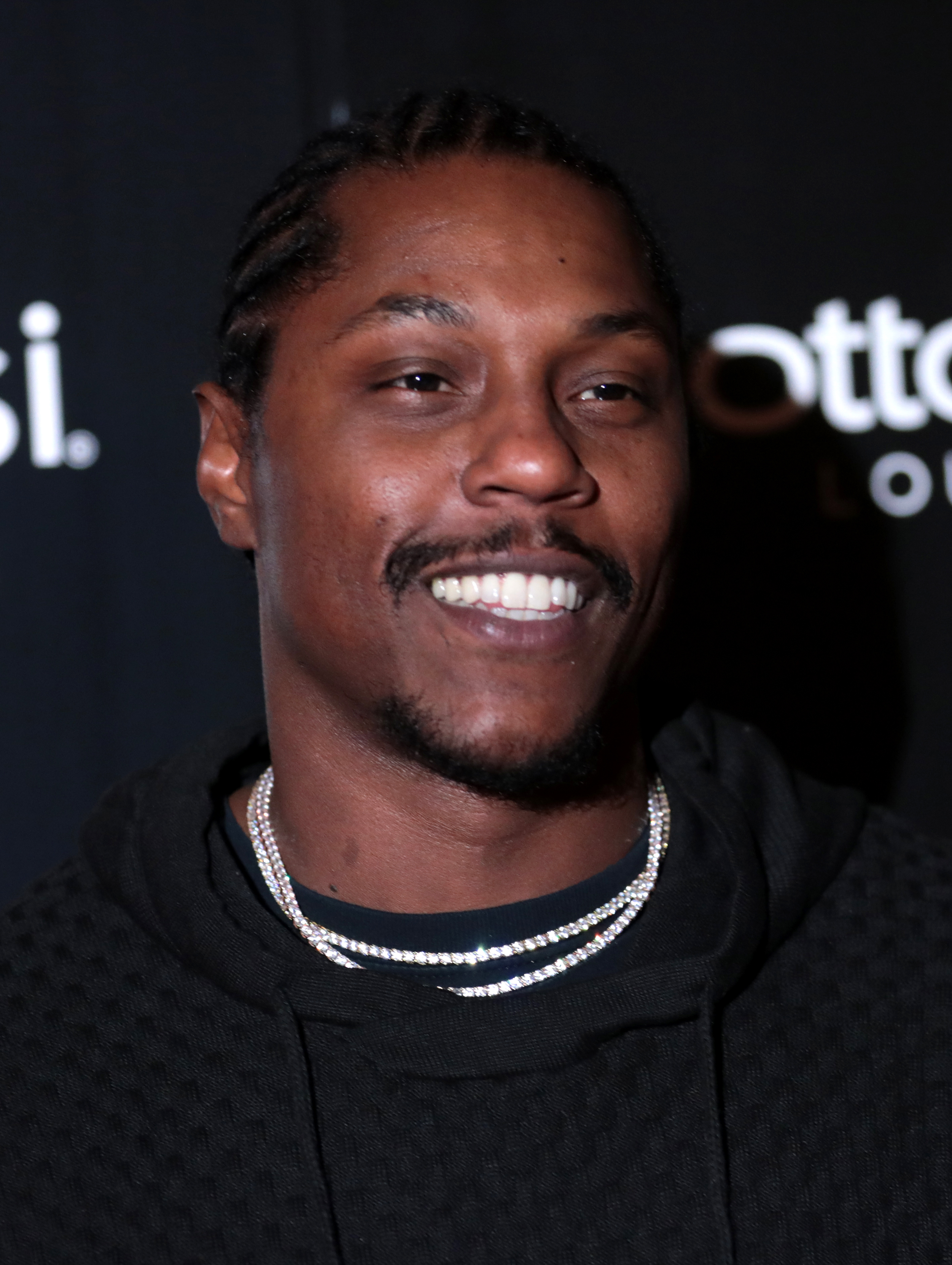
- Moreno in 2023

No. 27, 28
- Position: Running back

Personal information
- Born: July 16, 1987 (age 39); Belford, New Jersey, U.S.
- Listed height: 5 ft 11 in (1.80 m)
- Listed weight: 218 lb (99 kg)

Career information
- High school: Middletown South (Middletown, New Jersey)
- College: Georgia (2006–2008)
- NFL draft: 2009: 1st round, 12th overall pick

Career history
- Denver Broncos (2009–2013); Miami Dolphins (2014)

Awards and highlights
- PFWA All-Rookie Team (2009); First-team All-American (2008); 2× First-team All-SEC (2007, 2008); SEC Freshman of the Year (2007)

Career NFL statistics
- Rushing attempts: 876
- Rushing yards: 3,616
- Rushing touchdowns: 27
- Receptions: 158
- Receiving yards: 1,409
- Receiving touchdowns: 9
- Stats at Pro Football Reference

Knowshon Rockwell Moreno (born July 16, 1987) is an American former professional football player who was a running back in the National Football League (NFL). He played college football for the Georgia Bulldogs, earning first-team All-American honors in 2008. He was selected with the 12th overall pick in the 2009 NFL draft by the Denver Broncos. He also played for the Miami Dolphins.

== Early life ==
Moreno grew up in Belford, a neighborhood in Middletown Township, New Jersey. His parents are Freddie Moreno, who is of Puerto Rican descent and a former member of the Five-Percent Nation, and Varashon Mcqueen-Moreno who is of African-American descent. At Middletown High School South, he led his team to three Central Jersey Group III championships. He rushed for 1,629 yards on 153 carries and scored 28 touchdowns in 11 games as a senior. He finished his high school career with 6,268 career rushing yards, 128 touchdowns, and 768 points. His rushing yards are second all-time in New Jersey high school ranks, while he is New Jersey's all-time leading scorer. He also rushed for 420 yards and seven touchdowns in one game against the Neptune Scarlet Fliers. He also rushed for six touchdowns against the Monmouth Regional Falcons.

While at Middletown South, Moreno was also a top tier sprinter and jumper during the indoor and outdoor track seasons. In fact, he holds multiple school records, including the fastest time for the 100-meter dash at 11.01 seconds. He recorded a PR of 6.73 seconds in the 55 meters at the 2005 Shore Conference Championships, where he placed 4th. At the 2005 Monmouth County Championships, he captured three state titles, winning the 100 meters (11.1 s), the long jump (6.68 m) and the triple jump (13.38 m).

He was the #10 running back and #73 prospect according to Rivals.com, the #9 running back according to Scout.com, and was a PrepStar 200 selection. He was also an EA Sports All-American while being recruited by Georgia, Maryland, Michigan, Virginia, Virginia Tech, and Florida. Moreno eventually signed his letter of intent to Georgia.

== College career ==
=== 2007 season ===
Moreno redshirted in 2006, and entered the 2007 season as a redshirt freshman under head coach Mark Richt. After a great spring, Moreno shared time with Thomas Brown as the starting running back in the season opener against Oklahoma State. Moreno totaled 70 yards rushing on 12 carries with two receptions for 51 yards in the 35–14 win. In the following game against South Carolina, Moreno saw most of the rushing duties with 14 carries for 104 yards in the 12–16 loss. In the third game of the season against Western Carolina, Moreno scored his first career college touchdown in a 45–16 win over Western Carolina. His totals on the day were 94 yards on 13 rushes with one touchdown.

Entering the Bulldogs' game against Vanderbilt, it was announced that Georgia's starting tailback Thomas Brown would be sidelined with a broken collarbone. Moreno was elevated to starting tailback in Brown's place and responded with 157 rushing yards in the narrow 20–17 victory.

Following a bye week, he continued his impressive season with 188 yards rushing and three touchdowns on 33 carries as Georgia defeated its rival, Florida. Against Troy the next game, Moreno rushed for 196 yards, joining Herschel Walker as the only player in Georgia history to rush for 1,000 yards in his freshman season.

Moreno rushed for over 100 yards for the fifth straight game in leading the Georgia Bulldogs to a 24–13 victory over Kentucky while totaling 124 yards and a touchdown on 22 carries. Moreno is the first Georgia tailback since Herschel Walker in 1982 to rush for over 100 yards in five straight games.

Through the first ten weeks of the 2007 season, Moreno was named the SEC Freshman of the Week three times and SEC Offensive Player of the Week once. He was named onto the all-SEC first-team and was the unanimous SEC Freshman of the Year. He was the featured tailback on the Freshman All-American first-team and was named to the All-Freshman SEC team. Sporting News named him Freshman Offensive Player of the Year.

Moreno finished the season with 1,334 yards on 248 carries for 14 touchdowns. He also added 253 receiving yards on 20 receptions.

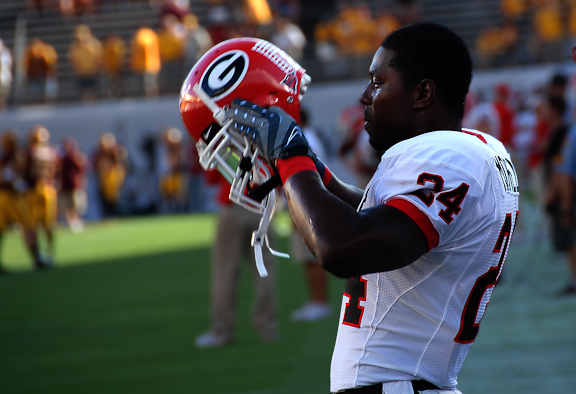
Moreno during his tenure at Georgia

=== 2008 season ===
Moreno began his sophomore campaign as a Heisman Trophy favorite. He opened the season with 59 yards on eight carries for three touchdowns and 53 yards on two receptions for a total of 112 yards and three touchdowns in the 45–21 win over Georgia Southern. He also had a tackle on a kickoff. In the following 56–17 win over Central Michigan, Moreno rushed 18 times for 168 yards and three touchdowns. He also had three receptions for 30 yards, totaling 198 yards of total offense in the win. In the SEC opener for the Bulldogs against South Carolina, Moreno had 20 carries for 79 yards and a touchdown in the 14–7 win. Next, Moreno and the Bulldogs traveled to Arizona to defeat Arizona State 27–10, led by his 149 yards and two touchdowns on 23 carries.

However, the Bulldogs' undefeated record was broken in a 41–30 loss to Alabama. In the loss, Moreno was held to 34 yards and a score on 9 carries. It was the only game on the season in which he was held under 50 yards rushing and 50 yards of total offense. However, Moreno bounced back in the 26–14 win over Tennessee with 101 yards. However, he was held out of the endzone for the first time on the season.

Georgia defeated Vanderbilt 24–14 to improve their record to 6–1, with Moreno rushing 23 times for a season-high 172 yards and a touchdown. Moreno added onto his season totals in the 52–38 victory against LSU with 163 yards and a touchdown on 21 carries. Moreno's totals in the two-week effort was 335 yards and two touchdowns on only 44 carries.

However, Georgia was handed their second conference loss in a 49–10 rout against eventual national champion Florida, in which Moreno was held to 65 yards on 17 carries. Moreno closed out the season strong with 410 yards rushing, 235 receiving and accounted for six touchdowns in the games against Kentucky, Auburn, Georgia Tech and Michigan State.

He finished the 2008 season with 1,792 yards of total offense (1,400 rushing on 250 carries and 392 yards on 33 receptions) and scored 18 touchdowns (16 rushing, 2 receiving). He was named the team's offensive MVP. He finished second in Doak Walker award voting, behind Shonn Greene. He was named first-team All-SEC for the second consecutive year, and was a second-team All-American selection. On January 7, 2009, Moreno announced that he would enter the 2009 NFL draft. Just after being drafted Moreno signed an endorsement deal with McDavidUSA and Hexpad equipment.

== Professional career ==
=== Pre-draft ===
Moreno was considered the best running back available in the 2009 NFL draft.

Pre-draft measurables
Height	Weight	Arm length	Hand span	40-yard dash	10-yard split	20-yard split	20-yard shuttle	Three-cone drill	Vertical jump	Broad jump	Bench press
5 ft 10 5/8 in (1.79 m)	217 lb (98 kg)	30 3/4 in (0.78 m)	10 in (0.25 m)	4.50 s	1.64 s	2.63 s	4.27 s	6.84 s	35.5 in (0.90 m)	9 ft 7 in (2.92 m)	25 reps
All values from NFL Combine

=== Denver Broncos ===
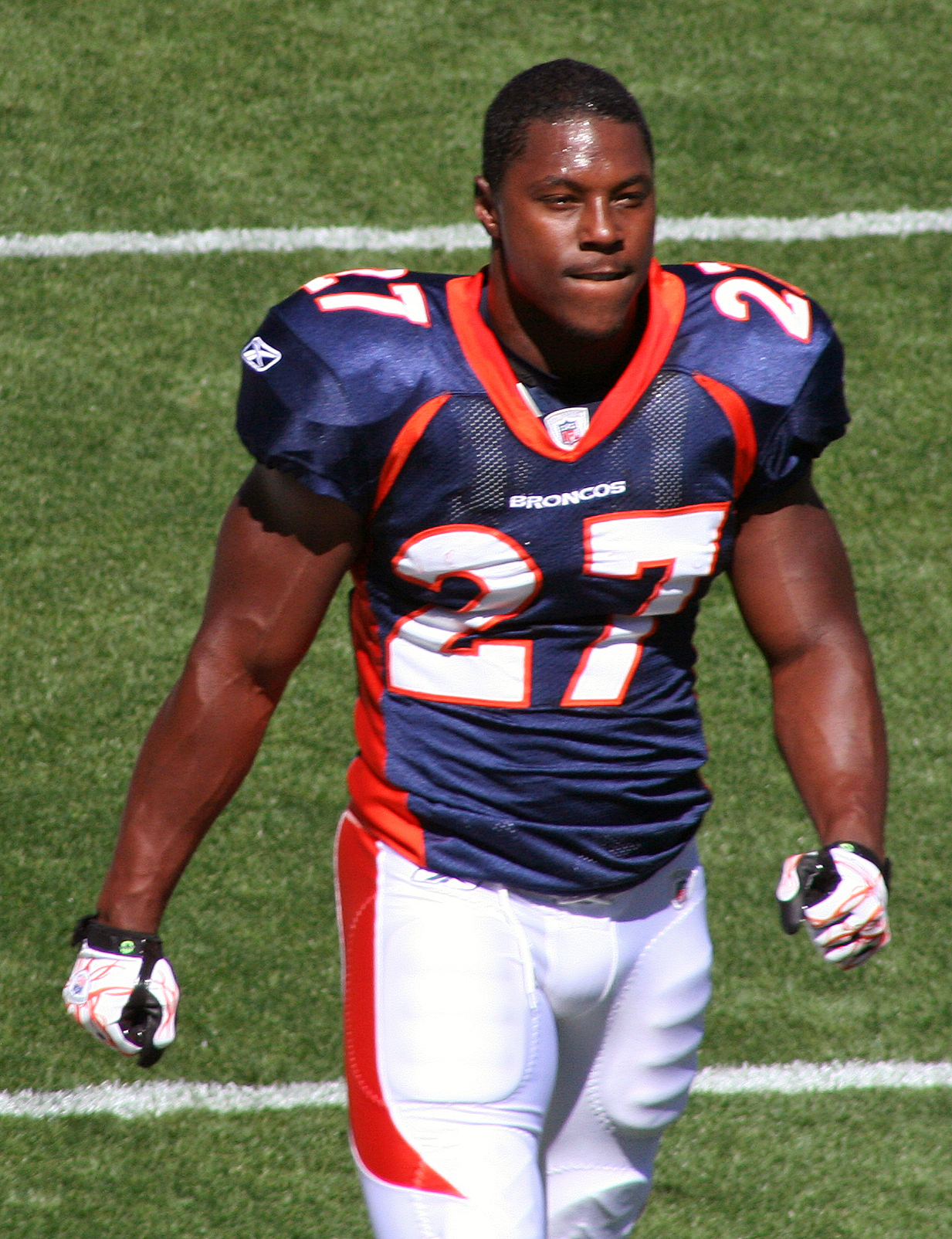
Moreno with the Denver Broncos in 2010

Moreno was selected by the Denver Broncos in the first round with the 12th overall pick, which was their first of two first-round picks in the 2009 NFL draft. He was the first running back and the second of six Georgia Bulldogs to be selected that year. Moreno chose to wear the number 27 on his jersey, the same number used by the late Darrent Williams. He received permission from Williams's mother Rosalind. Moreno said he would honor the number, and volunteer at the Darrent Williams Teen Center.

On August 7, 2009, after an eight-day holdout, Moreno signed a five-year, $18.084 million contract with a $2.094 million club option for 2014. The deal included $14.2 million guaranteed and Moreno could earn an additional $6.3 million through incentives. On September 27, 2009, Moreno scored his first career NFL touchdown with a seven-yard run against the Oakland Raiders. Overall, in the 2009 season, he had 947 rushing yards, seven rushing touchdowns, 213 receiving yards, and two receiving touchdowns.

In the 2010 season, Moreno had 779 rushing yards, five rushing touchdowns, 372 receiving yards, and three receiving touchdowns in 13 games.

During the 2011 season, Moreno split playing time with Willis McGahee. Moreno averaged a career-high 5.3 yards per carry. His season was cut short on November 15, 2011, when the Broncos placed Moreno on the IR after he tore his ACL against the Kansas City Chiefs finishing the season with 179 rushing yards and 1 total touchdown.

Moreno returned to the playing field for the 2012 season and ran for a seven-yard touchdown in the opening game win against the Pittsburgh Steelers. After he fumbled in the second game of the season against the Atlanta Falcons, Moreno was benched and was ruled inactive for eight straight weeks. After Willis McGahee was placed on injured reserve with a leg and knee injury, Moreno was reactivated. Despite speculation that rookie Ronnie Hillman, McGahee's backup, would assume the starting role, Moreno was named the starting running back in the next game against the Kansas City Chiefs. In his first game back, Moreno put up solid numbers, rushing for 97 yards on 20 carries and recorded one touchdown while still catching four passes for 26 yards. Two games later in an away game against the Oakland Raiders, Moreno rushed for 135 yards on a career-high 32 carries and recorded a touchdown. He also had four catches for 48 yards in the game. In the following game against the Baltimore Ravens, Moreno rushed for 115 yards on 21 carries and a touchdown. In the game, he hurdled over an upright Ed Reed on a 20-yard rush. For that game against the Ravens, Moreno was named "AFC Offensive Player of the Week" and was named the "Fedex Ground Player of the Week." Overall, Moreno finished the 2012 season with 525 rushing yards and four rushing touchdowns to go along with 21 receptions for 167 receiving yards.

Moreno continued his comeback into the 2013 season winning the starting running back job over frontrunners Ronnie Hillman and rookie Montee Ball. Moreno had a career-high 37 rushes for 224 yards against the New England Patriots in Week 12. During the Broncos' Week 16 win over the Houston Texans, Moreno became the first Bronco in franchise history to rush for over 1,000 yards and receive for over 500 yards in the same season. Moreno finished the 2013 season with 1038 rushing yards and ten rushing touchdowns to go along with 60 receptions for 548 receiving yards and three receiving touchdowns. Moreno and the Broncos reached Super Bowl XLVIII, but lost 43–8 to the Seattle Seahawks. Moreno had five carries for 17 yards and 3 receptions for 20 yards in the loss.

=== Miami Dolphins ===
On March 27, 2014, Moreno signed a one-year contract with the Miami Dolphins worth $6 million. In his debut with the Dolphins, despite not starting, he led the Dolphins to a 33–20 win over the New England Patriots, rushing for 134 yards on 24 carries. On September 14, Moreno sustained a dislocated left elbow in a loss to the Buffalo Bills. In his Week 6 return against the Green Bay Packers, he would tear his ACL, ending his 2014 season and, ultimately, his NFL career. He put up 10 yards on six carries, with one reception going for eight yards, in a 27–24 losing effort that would be his final NFL game. Moreno finished the season with 148 rushing yards and a rushing touchdown.

== Career statistics ==
=== NFL ===
Legend
**Bold**	Career high

Year	Team	Games		Rushing					Receiving					Fumbles	
Year	Team	GP	GS	Att	Yds	Avg	Lng	TD	Rec	Yds	Avg	Lng	TD	Fum	Lost
2009	DEN	**16**	9	**247**	947	3.8	**36**	7	28	213	7.6	27	2	**4**	**4**
2010	DEN	13	13	182	779	4.3	35	5	37	372	**10.1**	**45**	**3**	3	2
2011	DEN	7	2	37	179	**4.8**	24	0	11	101	9.2	28T	1	1	1
2012	DEN	8	6	138	525	3.8	20	4	21	167	8.0	26	0	1	1
2013	DEN	**16**	**15**	241	**1,038**	4.3	31	**10**	**60**	**548**	9.1	35T	**3**	1	0
2014	MIA	3	0	31	148	**4.8**	**36**	1	1	8	8	8.0	0	0	0
Total		63	45	876	3,616	4.1	36	27	158	1,409	8.9	45	9	10	8

=== College ===
	Rushing					Receiving				
YEAR	ATT	YDS	AVG	LNG	TD	NO.	YDS	AVG	LNG	TD
2006	Redshirt									
2007	248	1,334	5.4	80	14	20	253	12.7	35	0
2008	250	1,400	5.6	68	16	33	392	11.9	37	2
Total	498	2,734	5.5	80	30	53	645	12.2	37	2

== Personal life ==
Knowshon's first name is a portmanteau of his father's nickname, Knowledge, and his mother's name, Varashon.

Moreno is a Christian. Moreno has spoken about his faith after he was seen crying after "The Star-Spangled Banner" before a 2013 game saying, "During the anthem it's always quiet and still, so I take in the moment and say a little prayer... I thank the Lord for letting me play the game. I thank Him for everything. I run through my whole life right there at that moment. Even the bad stuff."
