= Mohamed Massaquoi =

American football player (born 1986)

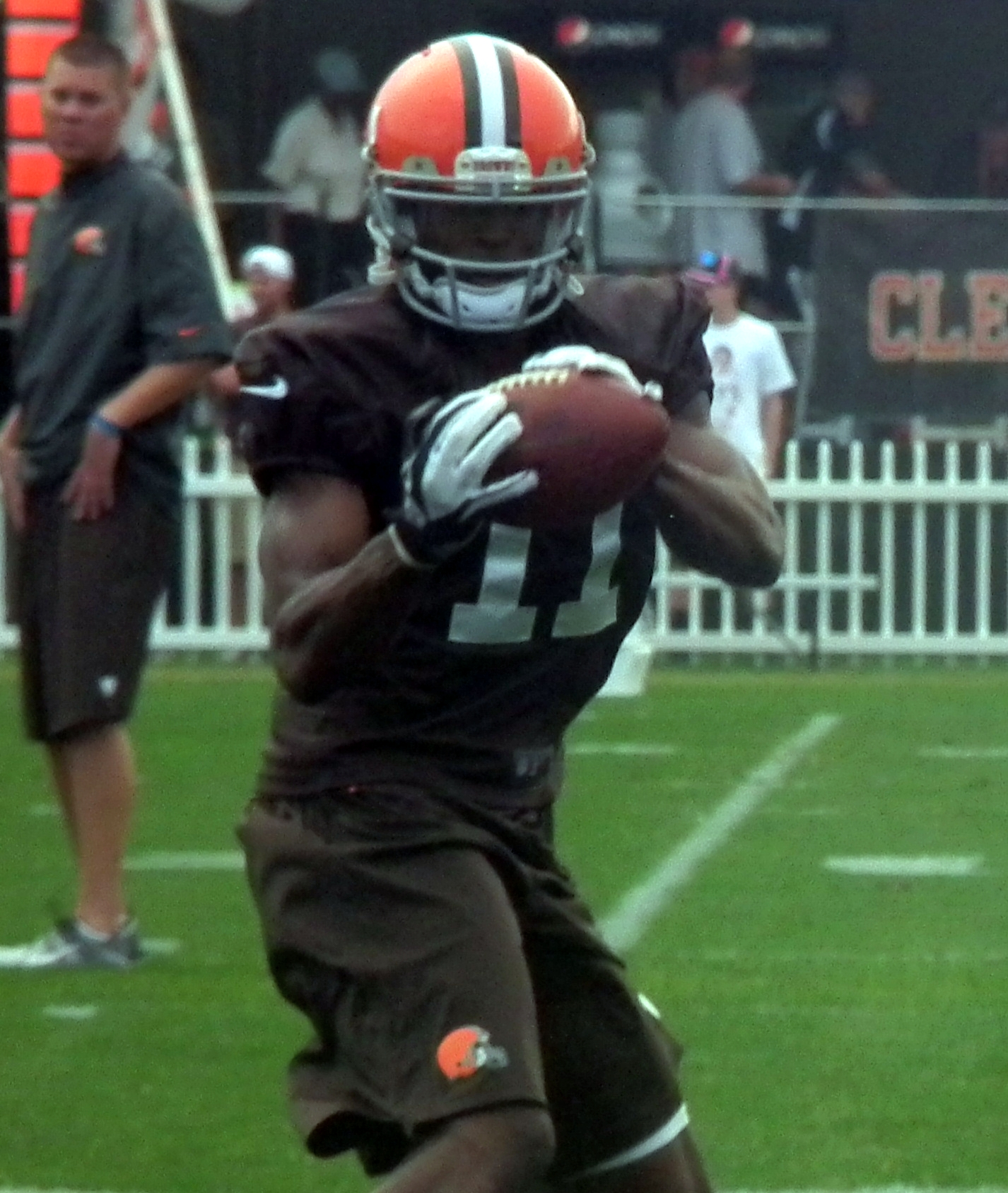
- Massaquoi with the Cleveland Browns in 2012

No. 11
- Position: Wide receiver

Personal information
- Born: November 24, 1986 (age 39); Charlotte, North Carolina, U.S.
- Listed height: 6 ft 2 in (1.88 m)
- Listed weight: 207 lb (94 kg)

Career information
- High school: Independence (Charlotte, North Carolina)
- College: Georgia (2005–2008)
- NFL draft: 2009: 2nd round, 50th overall pick

Career history
- Cleveland Browns (2009−2012); Jacksonville Jaguars (2013)*; New York Jets (2013)*
- * Offseason or practice squad member only

Awards and highlights
- First-team All-SEC (2008)

Career NFL statistics
- Receptions: 118
- Receiving yards: 1,745
- Receiving touchdowns: 7
- Stats at Pro Football Reference

Mohamed Jah Massaquoi (/ˈmæsəkwɑː/ MASS-ə-kwah; born November 24, 1986) is an American former professional football player who was a wide receiver in the National Football League (NFL). He played college football for the Georgia Bulldogs and was selected by the Cleveland Browns in the second round of the 2009 NFL draft.

Massaquoi was also a member of the Jacksonville Jaguars and New York Jets.

== Early life ==
Massaquoi was born in Charlotte, North Carolina to parents from Liberia. He played high school football at Independence High School. During his four years at Independence, his team did not lose a single game and won four straight North Carolina 4AA state championships. He played with two college football notables, former University of Florida quarterback Chris Leak and former University of North Carolina wide receiver Hakeem Nicks.

== College career ==
He finished his collegiate career at the University of Georgia with 158 catches for 2,282 yards and 16 touchdowns, which ranks fourth best in school history. Massaquoi had a strong senior season with career-highs in catches (58), yards (920), and touchdowns (8). In Massaquoi's last four regular-season games at Georgia, he caught 29 passes for 544 yards and 4 touchdowns (including a career-high 3 in Georgia's 45–42 loss to Georgia Tech). His longest reception came in his junior season against SEC East rival Florida, hauling in an 84-yard touchdown pass from quarterback Matthew Stafford.

== Professional career ==
Pre-draft measurables
Height	Weight	Arm length	Hand span	40-yard dash	10-yard split	20-yard split	20-yard shuttle	Three-cone drill	Vertical jump	Broad jump
6 ft 1 1/2 in (1.87 m)	210 lb (95 kg)	33 1/4 in (0.84 m)	9 7/8 in (0.25 m)	4.51 s	1.55 s	2.59 s	4.15 s	7.07 s	36.5 in (0.93 m)	10 ft 7 in (3.23 m)
All values from NFL Combine/Pro Day

=== Cleveland Browns ===
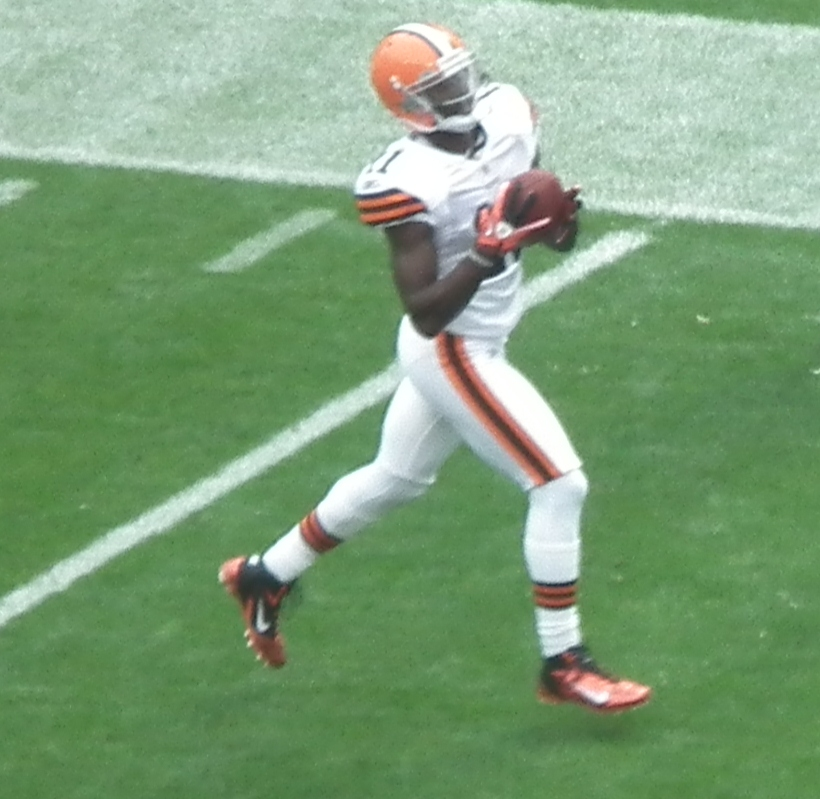
Massaquoi with the Browns in 2011

Massaquoi was drafted by the Browns in the second round with the 50th overall pick in the 2009 NFL draft.

Massaquoi was the Browns leading receiver during his rookie season (2009) with 34 catches for 624 yards, including an NFL best 148 receiving yards (on 8 catches) in Week 4.

In his four years with the Browns, Massaquoi caught a total of 118 passes for 1,745 yards and 7 touchdowns.

=== Jacksonville Jaguars ===
Massaquoi was signed by the Jacksonville Jaguars on April 5, 2013, on a two-year deal. However, he was released on August 19.

=== New York Jets ===
Massaquoi signed with the New York Jets on August 22, 2013. He was released on August 31.

== Accident ==
In April 2017, Massaquoi had an ATV accident which led to the amputation of four fingers on his left hand.
