= List of Georgia Bulldogs bowl games =

American college football records

The Georgia Bulldogs football team competes on behalf of the University of Georgia in the NCAA Division I Football Bowl Subdivision in the Southeastern Conference. Although not participating in its first bowl game until 1942, the Bulldogs are second in the number of bowl appearances (64) and second in the number of bowl victories (38), as of the 2025 season.

In the calendar year 2023, the Bulldogs broke the record for the biggest bowl margin of victory twice. On January 9, 2023, Georgia beat TCU by a score of 65-7, taking the record from LSU, Army and Tulsa who each had 56 point victories in bowl games. Topping their own record 355 days later on December 30, 2023, Georgia defeated FSU by a margin of 60 points (63-3) in the Orange Bowl.

As of 2024, Georgia holds the longest active bowl appearance streak at 27 seasons and is tied with Virginia Tech at fourth place in the all-time longest bowl appearance streak.

== Key ==
Type of Game
New Year's Six Bowl or CFP Quarterfinal
CFP Semifinal
CFP National Championship Game

Game Results
Win
Loss
Tie

== List of Bowl Games ==
List of bowl games showing bowl played in, score, date, season, opponent, stadium, location, attendance and head coach
#	Bowl	Score	Date	Season	Opponent	Stadium	Location	Attendance	Head coach
1	Orange Bowl	W 20–19	January 1, 1942	1941	TCU Horned Frogs	Burdine Stadium	Miami, Florida	35,786	Wally Butts
2	Rose Bowl	W 9-0	January 1, 1943	1942	UCLA Bruins	Rose Bowl	Pasadena, California	93,000	Wally Butts
3	Oil Bowl	W 20-6	January 1, 1946	1945	Tulsa Golden Hurricanes	Rice Field	Houston, Texas	27,000	Wally Butts
4	Sugar Bowl	W 20-10	January 1, 1947	1946	North Carolina Tar Heels	Tulane Stadium	New Orleans, Louisiana	73,300	Wally Butts
5	Gator Bowl	T 20–20	January 1, 1948	1947	Maryland Terrapins	Gator Bowl Stadium	Jacksonville, Florida	16,666	Wally Butts
6	Orange Bowl	L 41–28	January 1, 1949	1948	Texas Longhorns	Burdine Stadium	Miami, Florida	60,523	Wally Butts
7	Presidential Cup Bowl	L 40–20	December 9, 1950	1950	Texas A&M Aggies	Byrd Stadium	College Park, Maryland	12,245	Wally Butts
8	Orange Bowl	W 14-0	January 1, 1960	1959	Missouri Tigers	Orange Bowl	Miami, Florida	72,186	Wally Butts
9	Sun Bowl	W 7-0	December 26, 1964	1964	Texas Tech Red Raiders	Sun Bowl	El Paso, Texas	23,292	Vince Dooley
10	Cotton Bowl	W 24-9	December 31, 1966	1966	SMU Mustangs	Cotton Bowl	Dallas, Texas	76,200	Vince Dooley
11	Liberty Bowl	L 14-7	December 16, 1967	1967	NC State Wolfpack	Memphis Memorial Stadium	Memphis, Tennessee	35,045	Vince Dooley
12	Sugar Bowl	L 16-2	January 1, 1969	1968	Arkansas Razorbacks	Tulane Stadium	New Orleans, Louisiana	82,113	Vince Dooley
13	Sun Bowl	L 45-6	December 20, 1969	1969	Nebraska Cornhuskers	Sun Bowl	El Paso, Texas	31,723	Vince Dooley
14	Gator Bowl	W 7-3	December 31, 1971	1971	North Carolina Tar Heels	Gator Bowl Stadium	Jacksonville, Florida	71,208	Vince Dooley
15	Peach Bowl	W 17-16	December 28, 1973	1973	Maryland Terrapins	Atlanta-Fulton County Stadium	Atlanta, Georgia	38,107	Vince Dooley
16	Tangerine Bowl	L 21-10	December 21, 1974	1974	Miami Redskins	Tangerine Bowl	Orlando, Florida	20,246	Vince Dooley
17	Cotton Bowl	L 31-10	January 1, 1976	1975	Arkansas Razorbacks	Cotton Bowl	Dallas, Texas	77,500	Vince Dooley
18	Sugar Bowl	L 27-3	January 1, 1977	1976	Pittsburgh Panthers	Louisiana Super Dome	New Orleans, Louisiana	76,117	Vince Dooley
19	Bluebonnet Bowl	L 25-22	December 31, 1978	1978	Stanford Cardinals	Astrodome	Houston, Texas	34,084	Vince Dooley
20	Sugar Bowl	W 17-10	January 1, 1981	1980	Notre Dame Fighting Irish	Louisiana Super Dome	New Orleans, Louisiana	77,896	Vince Dooley
21	Sugar Bowl	L 24-20	January 1, 1982	1981	Pittsburgh Panthers	Louisiana Super Dome	New Orleans, Louisiana	85,161	Vince Dooley
22	Sugar Bowl	L 27-23	January 1, 1983	1982	Penn State Nittany Lions	Louisiana Super Dome	New Orleans, Louisiana	78,127	Vince Dooley
23	Cotton Bowl	W 10-9	January 2, 1984	1983	Texas Longhorns	Cotton Bowl	Dallas, Texas	67,891	Vince Dooley
24	Citrus Bowl	T 17-17	December 22, 1984	1984	Florida State Seminoles	Florida Citrus Bowl	Orlando, Florida	51,821	Vince Dooley
25	Sun Bowl	T 13-13	December 28, 1985	1985	Arizona Wildcats	Sun Bowl	El Paso, Texas	52,203	Vince Dooley
26	Hall of Fame Bowl	L 27-24	December 23, 1986	1986	Boston College Eagles	Tampa Stadium	Tampa, Florida	41,000	Vince Dooley
27	Liberty Bowl	W 20-17	December 29, 1987	1987	Arkansas Razorbacks	Liberty Bowl Memorial Stadium	Memphis, Tennessee	53,240	Vince Dooley
28	Gator Bowl	W 34-27	January 1, 1989	1988	Michigan State Spartans	Gator Bowl Stadium	Jacksonville, Florida	76,236	Vince Dooley
29	Peach Bowl	L 19-18	December 30, 1989	1989	Syracuse Orangemen	Atlanta-Fulton County Stadium	Atlanta, Georgia	44,911	Ray Goff
30	Independence Bowl	W 24-15	December 29, 1991	1991	Arkansas Razorbacks	Independence Stadium	Shreveport, Louisiana	44,621	Ray Goff
31	Citrus Bowl	W 24-17	January 1, 1993	1992	Ohio State Buckeyes	Florida Citrus Bowl	Orlando, Florida	72,456	Ray Goff
32	Peach Bowl	L 34-27	December 30, 1995	1995	Virginia Cavaliers	Georgia Dome	Atlanta, Georgia	70,284	Ray Goff
33	Outback Bowl	W 33-6	January 1, 1998	1997	Wisconsin Badgers	Houlihan's Stadium	Tampa, Florida	56,186	Jim Donnan
34	Peach Bowl	W 35-33	December 31, 1998	1998	Virginia Cavaliers	Georgia Dome	Atlanta, Georgia	72,876	Jim Donnan
35	Outback Bowl	W 28-25^{OT}	January 1, 2000	1999	Purdue Boilermakers	Raymond James Stadium	Tampa, Florida	54,059	Jim Donnan
36	Oahu Bowl	W 37-14	December 25, 2000	2000	Virginia Cavaliers	Aloha Stadium	Honolulu, Hawaii	24,187	Jim Donnan
37	Music City Bowl	L 20-16	December 28, 2001	2001	Boston College	Adelphia Coliseum	Nashville, Tennessee	46,125	Mark Richt
38	Sugar Bowl	W 26-13	January 1, 2003	2002	Florida State Seminoles	Louisiana Super Dome	New Orleans, Louisiana	74,269	Mark Richt
39	Capital One Bowl	W 34-27^{OT}	January 1, 2004	2003	Purdue Boilermakers	Florida Citrus Bowl	Orlando, Florida	64,565	Mark Richt
40	Outback Bowl	W 24-21	January 1, 2005	2004	Wisconsin Badgers	Raymond James Stadium	Tampa, Florida	62,414	Mark Richt
41	Sugar Bowl	L 38-35	January 3, 2006	2005	West Virginia Mountaineers	Georgia Dome	Atlanta, Georgia	74,458	Mark Richt
42	Chick-fil-A Bowl	W 31-24	December 30, 2006	2006	Virginia Tech Hokies	Georgia Dome	Atlanta, Georgia	76,406	Mark Richt
43	Sugar Bowl	W 41-10	January 1, 2008	2007	Hawaii Warriors	Louisiana Super Dome	New Orleans, Louisiana	74,383	Mark Richt
44	Capital One Bowl	W 24-12	January 1, 2009	2008	Michigan State Spartans	Florida Citrus Bowl	Orlando, Florida	69,748	Mark Richt
45	Independence Bowl	W 44-20	December 28, 2009	2009	Texas A&M Aggies	Independence Stadium	Shreveport, Louisiana	49,653	Mark Richt
46	Liberty Bowl	L 10-6	December 31, 2010	2010	UCF Knights	Liberty Bowl Memorial Stadium	Memphis, Tennessee	62,742	Mark Richt
47	Outback Bowl	L 33-30^{3OT}	January 2, 2012	2011	Michigan State Spartans	Raymond James Stadium	Tampa, Florida	49,429	Mark Richt
48	Capital One Bowl	W 45-31	January 1, 2013	2012	Nebraska Cornhuskers	Florida Citrus Bowl	Orlando, Florida	59,712	Mark Richt
49	Gator Bowl	W 24-19	January 1, 2014	2013	Nebraska Cornhuskers	Everbank Field	Jacksonville, Florida	60,712	Mark Richt
50	Belk Bowl	W 37-14	December 30, 2014	2014	Louisville Cardinals	Bank of America Stadium	Charlotte, North Carolina	45,671	Mark Richt
51	Tax Slayer Bowl	W 24-17	January 1, 2016	2015	Penn State Nittany Lions	Everbank Field	Jacksonville, Florida	43,102	Bryan McClendon
52	Liberty Bowl	W 31-23	December 30, 2016	2016	TCU Horned Frogs	Liberty Bowl Memorial Stadium	Memphis, Tennessee	57,266	Kirby Smart
53	Rose Bowl	W 54-48^{2OT}	January 1, 2018	2017	Oklahoma Sooners	Rose Bowl	Pasadena, California	92,844	Kirby Smart
54	CFP National Championship	L 26-23^{OT}	January 8, 2018	2017	Alabama Crimson Tide	Mercedes Benz Stadium	Atlanta, Georgia	77,430	Kirby Smart
55	Sugar Bowl	L 28-21	January 1, 2019	2018	Texas Longhorns	Mercedes-Benz Superdome	New Orleans, Louisiana	71,449	Kirby Smart
56	Sugar Bowl	W 26-14	January 1, 2020	2019	Baylor Bears	Mercedes-Benz Superdome	New Orleans, Louisiana	55,211	Kirby Smart
57	Peach Bowl	W 24-21	January 1, 2021	2020	Cincinnati Bearcats	Mercedes-Benz Stadium	Atlanta, Georgia	15,301	Kirby Smart
58	Orange Bowl	W 34-11	December 31, 2021	2021	Michigan Wolverines	Hard Rock Stadium	Miami Gardens, Florida	66,839	Kirby Smart
59	CFP National Championship	W 33-18	January 10, 2022	2021	Alabama Crimson Tide	Lucas Oil Stadium	Indianapolis, Indiana	68,311	Kirby Smart
60	Peach Bowl	W 42-41	December 31, 2022	2022	Ohio State Buckeyes	Mercedes-Benz Stadium	Atlanta, Georgia	79,330	Kirby Smart
61	CFP National Championship	W 65-7	January 9, 2023	2022	TCU Horned Frogs	SoFi Stadium	Inglewood, California	72,628	Kirby Smart
62	Orange Bowl	W 63-3	December 30, 2023	2023	Florida State Seminoles	Hard Rock Stadium	Miami Gardens, Florida	72,628	Kirby Smart
63	Sugar Bowl	L 23-10	January 2, 2025	2024	Notre Dame	Mercedes-Benz Superdome	New Orleans, Louisiana	57,267	Kirby Smart
64	Sugar Bowl	L 39-34	January 1, 2026	2025	Ole Miss	Mercedes-Benz Superdome	New Orleans, Louisiana	68,371	Kirby Smart

Georgia Bulldog bowl games: all-time records by bowl
Bowl	Record	Appearances	Last	Winning %
Duke's Mayo Bowl (played game under Belk Bowl title)	1–0	1	2014 season	1.000
Bluebonnet Bowl (defunct)	0–1	1	1978 season	.000
Citrus Bowl (played game under Tangerine Bowl, Citrus Bowl, and Capital One Bowl titles)	4–1–1	6	2012 season	.750
Chick-fil-A Peach Bowl	5–2	7	2022 season	.714
Cotton Bowl Classic	2–1	3	1983 season	.667
Independence Bowl	2–0	2	2009 season	1.000
Liberty Bowl	2–2	4	2016 season	.500
Music City Bowl	0–1	1	2001 season	.000
Oahu Bowl (defunct)	1–0	1	2000 season	1.000
Oil Bowl (defunct)	1–0	1	1945 season	1.000
Outback Bowl (played games under Hall of Fame Bowl and Outback Bowl titles)	3–2	5	2011 season	.600
Orange Bowl	4–1	5	2023 season	.800
Presidential Cup Bowl (defunct)	0–1	1	1950 season	.000
Rose Bowl	2–0	2	2017 season	1.000
Sugar Bowl	5–7	12	2019 season	.417
Sun Bowl	1–1–1	3	1985 season	.500
Gator Bowl (played games under Gator Bowl and Taxslayer Bowl titles)	3–1–1	5	2015 season	.700
