= List of Georgia Bulldogs football seasons =

The following is a list of Georgia Bulldogs football seasons. The Bulldogs currently compete in the Southeastern Conference, and have an overall record of 890–431–54 in 127 seasons.

== Seasons ==
Year	Team	Overall	Conference	Standing	Bowl/playoffs	Coaches^{#}	AP^{°}
Charles Herty (Independent) (1892)
1892	Georgia	1–1					
Herty:		1–1					
Ernest Brown (Independent) (1893)
1893	Georgia	2–2–1					
Brown:		2–2–1					
Robert Winston (Independent) (1894)
1894	Georgia	5–1					
Winston:		5–1					
Glenn Scobey "Pop" Warner (Southern Intercollegiate Athletic Association) (1895–1896)
1895	Georgia	3–4	2–4	3rd			
1896	Georgia	4–0	2–0	T–1st			
Warner:		7–4	5–4				
Charles McCarthy (Southern Intercollegiate Athletic Association) (1897–1898)
1897	Georgia	2–1	2–0	2nd			
1898	Georgia	4–2	3–1	4th			
McCarthy:		6–3	5–2				
Gordon Saussy (Southern Intercollegiate Athletic Association) (1899)
1899	Georgia	2–3–1	2–3–1	10th			
Saussy:		2–3–1	2–3–1				
E. E. Jones (Southern Intercollegiate Athletic Association) (1900)
1900	Georgia	2–4	1–4	10th			
Jones:		2–4	1–3				
William A. Reynolds (Southern Intercollegiate Athletic Association) (1901–1902)
1901	Georgia	1–5–2	0–3–2	12th			
1902	Georgia	4–2–1	3–2–1	7th			
Reynolds:		5–7–3	4–7–3				
Marvin M. Dickinson (Southern Intercollegiate Athletic Association) (1903)
1903	Georgia	3–4	3–2	6th			
1904	Georgia	1–5	0–4	14th			
1905	Georgia	1–5	0–5	14th			
Dickinson:		5–14	3–11				
George S. Whitney (Southern Intercollegiate Athletic Association) (1906–1907)
1906	Georgia	2–4–1	2–2–1	7th			
1907	Georgia	4–3–1	3–3–1	T–7th			
Whitney:		6–7–2	4–6–2				
Branch Bocock (Southern Intercollegiate Athletic Association) (1908)
1908	Georgia	5–2–1	2–2–1	T–6th			
Bocock:		5–2–1					
James Coulter & Frank Dobson (Southern Intercollegiate Athletic Association) (1909)
1909	Georgia	2–4–2	1–4–1	10th			
Coulter & Dobson:		2–4–2	1–4–2				
W. A. Cunningham (Southern Intercollegiate Athletic Association) (1910–1919)
1910	Georgia	6–2–1	4–2–1	4th			
1911	Georgia	7–1–1	5–1–1	3rd			
1912	Georgia	6–1–1	5–1–1	5th			
1913	Georgia	6–2	3–1	3rd			
1914	Georgia	3–5–1	2–2–1	T–8th			
1915	Georgia	5–2–2	3–1–1	6th			
1916	Georgia	6–3	5–2	9th			
1917	No team						
1918	No team						
1919	Georgia	4–2–3	4–2–2	10th			
Cunningham:		43–18–9	31–17–9				
Herman Stegeman (Southern Intercollegiate Athletic Association/Southern Conference) (1920–1922)
1920	Georgia	8–0–1	7–0	1st			
1921	Georgia	7–2–1	6–0–1	T–1st			
1922	Georgia	5–4–1	1–3–1	T–16th			
Stegeman:		20–6–3	15–3–3				
George Cecil Woodruff (Southern Conference) (1923–1927)
1923	Georgia	5–3–1	3–2	8th			
1924	Georgia	7–3	5–1	T–2nd			
1925	Georgia	4–5	2–4	14th			
1926	Georgia	5–4	4–2	T–4th			
1927	Georgia	9–1	6–1	T–4th			
Woodruff:		30–16–1	21–10				
Harry Mehre (Southern Conference/Southeastern Conference) (1928–1937)
1928	Georgia	4–5	2–4	17th			
1929	Georgia	6–4	4–2	T–7th			
1930	Georgia	7–2–1	3–2–1	10th			
1931	Georgia	8–2	6–1	4th			
1932	Georgia	2–5–2	2–4–2	15th			
1933	Georgia	8–2	3–1	3rd			
1934	Georgia	7–3	3–2	5th			
1935	Georgia	6–4	2–4	11th			
1936	Georgia	5–4–1	3–3	T–6th			
1937	Georgia	6–3–2	1–2–2	10th			
Mehre:		59–34–6	29–25–5				
Joel Hunt (Southeastern Conference) (1938)
1938	Georgia	5–4–1	1–2–1	9th			
Hunt:		5–4–1	1–2–1				
Wally Butts (Southeastern Conference) (1939–1960)
1939	Georgia	5–6	1–3	8th			
1940	Georgia	5–4–1	2–3–1	7th			
1941	Georgia	9–1–1	3–1–1	4th	W Orange		14
1942	Georgia	11–1	5–1	1st	W Rose		2
1943	Georgia	6–4	0–3	4th			
1944	Georgia	7–3	4–2	T–3rd			
1945	Georgia	9–2	4–2	4th	W Oil		18
1946	Georgia	11–0	5–0	T–1st	W Sugar		3
1947	Georgia	7–4–1	3–3	T–4th	T Gator		
1948	Georgia	9–2	6–0	1st	L Orange		8
1949	Georgia	4–6–1	1–4–1	T–10th			
1950	Georgia	6–3–3	3–2–1	6th	L Presidential Cup		
1951	Georgia	5–5	2–4	T–9th			
1952	Georgia	7–4	4–3	5th			
1953	Georgia	3–8	1–5	T–10th			
1954	Georgia	6–3–1	3–2–1	5th			
1955	Georgia	4–6	2–5	11th			
1956	Georgia	3–6–1	1–6	12th			
1957	Georgia	3–7	3–4	9th			
1958	Georgia	4–6	2–4	10th			
1959	Georgia	10–1	7–0	1st	W Orange	5	5
1960	Georgia	6–4	4–3	6th			
Butts:		140–86–9	66–60–5				
Johnny Griffith (Southeastern Conference) (1961–1963)
1961	Georgia	3–7	2–5	9th			
1962	Georgia	3–4–3	2–3–1	T–7th			
1963	Georgia	4–5–1	2–4	9th			
Griffith:		10–16–4	6–12–1				
Vince Dooley (Southeastern Conference) (1964–1988)
1964	Georgia	7–3–1	4–2	T–2nd	W Sun		
1965	Georgia	6–4	3–3	T–6th		15	
1966	Georgia	10–1	6–0	T–1st	W Cotton^{†}	4	4
1967	Georgia	7–4	4–2	T–3rd	L Liberty	18	
1968	Georgia	8–1–2	5–0–1	1st	L Sugar^{†}	4	8
1969	Georgia	5–5–1	2–3–1	6th	L Sun		
1970	Georgia	5–5	3–3	T–5th			
1971	Georgia	11–1	5–1	T–2nd	W Gator	8	7
1972	Georgia	7–4	4–3	5th			
1973	Georgia	7–4–1	3–4	T–5th	W Peach		
1974	Georgia	6–6	4–2	T–2nd	L Tangerine		
1975	Georgia	9–3	5–1	T–2nd	L Cotton	19	19
1976	Georgia	10–2	5–1	1st	L Sugar^{†}	10	10
1977	Georgia	5–6	2–4	T–6th			
1978	Georgia	9–2–1	5–0–1	2nd	L Bluebonnet	15	16
1979	Georgia	6–5	5–1	2nd			
1980	Georgia	12–0	6–0	1st	W Sugar^{†}	1	1
1981	Georgia	10–2	6–0	T–1st	L Sugar^{†}	5	6
1982	Georgia	11–1	6–0	1st	L Sugar^{†}	4	4
1983	Georgia	10–1–1	5–1	2nd	W Cotton^{†}	4	4
1984	Georgia	7–4–1	4–2	T–3rd	T Florida Citrus		
1985	Georgia	7–3–2	3–2–1	5th	T Sun		
1986	Georgia	8–4	4–2	T–2nd	L Hall of Fame		
1987	Georgia	9–3	4–2	T–4th	W Liberty	14	13
1988	Georgia	9–3	5–2	3rd	W Gator	15	15
Dooley:		201–77–10	108–41–4				
Ray Goff (Southeastern Conference) (1989–1995)
1989	Georgia	6–6	4–3	4th	L Peach		
1990	Georgia	4–7	2–5	7th			
1991	Georgia	9–3	4–3	4th	W Independence	19	17
1992	Georgia	10–2	6–2	T–1st (Eastern)	W Florida Citrus	8	8
1993	Georgia	5–6	2–6	4th (Eastern)			
1994	Georgia	6–4–1	3–4–1	4th (Eastern)			
1995	Georgia	6–6	3–5	3rd (Eastern)	L Peach		
Goff:		46–34–1	24–28–1				
Jim Donnan (Southeastern Conference) (1996–2000)
1996	Georgia	5–6	3–5	T–4th (Eastern)			
1997	Georgia	10–2	6–2	T–2nd (Eastern)	W Outback	10	10
1998	Georgia	9–3	6–2	3rd (Eastern)	W Peach	14	14
1999	Georgia	8–4	5–3	3rd (Eastern)	W Outback	16	16
2000	Georgia	8–4	5–3	T–2nd (Eastern)	W Oahu	17	20
Donnan:		40–19	25–15				
Mark Richt (Southeastern Conference) (2001–2015)
2001	Georgia	8–4	5–3	T–3rd (Eastern)	L Music City	25	22
2002	Georgia	13–1	7–1	1st (Eastern)	W Sugar^{†}	3	3
2003	Georgia	11–3	6–2	T–1st (Eastern)	W Capital One	6	7
2004	Georgia	10–2	6–2	2nd (Eastern)	W Outback	6	7
2005	Georgia	10–3	6–2	1st (Eastern)	L Sugar^{†}	10	10
2006	Georgia	9–4	4–4	T–3rd (Eastern)	W Chick-fil-A		23
2007	Georgia	11–2	6–2	T–1st (Eastern)	W Sugar^{†}	3	2
2008	Georgia	10–3	6–2	2nd (Eastern)	W Capital One	10	13
2009	Georgia	8–5	4–4	T–2nd (Eastern)	W Independence		
2010	Georgia	6–7	3–5	T–3rd (Eastern)	L Liberty		
2011	Georgia	10–4	7–1	1st (Eastern)	L Outback	20	19
2012	Georgia	12–2	7–1	T–1st (Eastern)	W Capital One	4	5
2013	Georgia	8–5	5–3	3rd (Eastern)	L Gator		
2014	Georgia	10–3	6–2	2nd (Eastern)	W Belk	9	9
2015	Georgia (Note: Mark Richt departed Georgia before the bowl game, which was coached by Bryan McClendon.)	10–3	5–3	T–2nd (Eastern)	W TaxSlayer	24	
Richt:		145–51	83–37				
Kirby Smart (Southeastern Conference) (2016–present)
2016	Georgia	8–5	4–4	T–2nd (Eastern)	W Liberty		
2017	Georgia	13–2	7–1	1st (Eastern)	W Rose Bowl^{†} (CFP Semifinal); L CFP NCG^{†}	2	2
2018	Georgia	11–3	7–1	1st (Eastern)	L Sugar^{†}	8	7
2019	Georgia	12–2	7–1	1st (Eastern)	W Sugar^{†}	4	4
2020	Georgia	8–2	7–2	2nd (Eastern)	W Peach^{†}	7	7
2021	Georgia	14–1	8–0	1st (Eastern)	W Orange^{†} (CFP Semifinal); W CFP NCG^{†}	1	1
2022	Georgia	15–0	8–0	1st (Eastern)	W Peach^{†} (CFP Semifinal); W CFP NCG^{†}	1	1
2023	Georgia	13–1	8–0	1st (Eastern)	W Orange^{†}	3	4
2024	Georgia	11–3	6–2	T–2nd	L Sugar^{†} (CFP Quarterfinal)	6	6
2025	Georgia	12–2	7–1	T–1st	L Sugar^{†} (CFP Quarterfinal)	5	6
Smart:		117–21	69–12				
Total:		890–433–54					
National championship Conference title Conference division title or championship game berth
^{†}Indicates Bowl Coalition, Bowl Alliance, BCS, or CFP / New Years' Six bowl.; ^{#}Rankings from final Coaches Poll.; ^{°}Rankings from final AP Poll.
