= Georgia Bulldogs football =

American football team of the University of Georgia

2026 Georgia Bulldogs football team
- First season: 1892; 134 years ago
- Athletic director: Josh Brooks
- Head coach: Kirby Smart; 11th season, 127–22 (.852)
- Location: Athens, Georgia
- Stadium: Sanford Stadium (capacity: 93,033)
- Field: Dooley Field
- NCAA division: Division I FBS
- Conference: SEC
- Colors: Red and black
- All-time record: 914–435–54 (.671)
- CFP record: 5–3 (.625)
- Bowl record: 38–23–3 (.617)

National championships
- Claimed: 1942, 1980, 2021, 2022
- Unclaimed: 1920, 1927, 1946, 1968

National finalist
- Poll era: 1982
- CFP: 2017, 2021, 2022

College Football Playoff appearances
- 2017, 2021, 2022, 2024, 2025

Conference championships
- SIAA: 1896, 1920 SEC: 1942, 1946, 1948, 1959, 1966, 1968, 1976, 1980, 1981, 1982, 2002, 2005, 2017, 2022, 2024, 2025

Division championships
- SEC East: 1992, 2002, 2003, 2005, 2007, 2011, 2012, 2017, 2018, 2019, 2021, 2022, 2023
- Heisman winners: Frank Sinkwich – 1942; Herschel Walker – 1982
- Consensus All-Americans: 42
- Rivalries: Georgia Tech (rivalry); Florida (rivalry); Auburn (rivalry); South Carolina (rivalry); Tennessee (rivalry); Alabama (rivalry); Clemson (rivalry); Vanderbilt (rivalry)

Uniforms
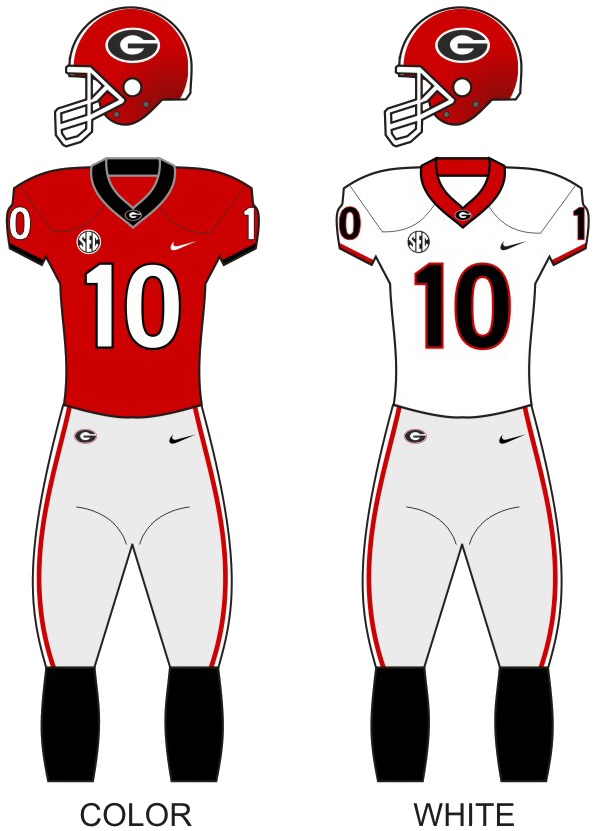
- Fight song: Hail to Georgia
- Mascot: Uga; Hairy Dawg
- Marching band: Georgia Redcoat Marching Band
- Outfitter: Nike
- Website: georgiadogs.com

The Georgia Bulldogs football program represents the University of Georgia in the sport of American football. The Bulldogs compete in the Football Bowl Subdivision (FBS) of the National Collegiate Athletic Association (NCAA) and the Southeastern Conference (SEC). They play their home games at historic Sanford Stadium on the university's Athens, Georgia, campus.

Georgia claims four national championships, including three (1980, 2021, 2022) from the major wire-services: AP Poll and/or Coaches' Poll. The Bulldogs' other accomplishments include 18 conference championships, of which 16 are SEC championships, second-most in conference history, and appearances in 64 bowl games, second-most all-time. The program has also produced two Heisman Trophy winners, five number-one National Football League (NFL) draft picks, and many winners of other national awards. At 25, Georgia has the longest active streak among colleges in consecutive years having at least one former player on a Super Bowl roster. In addition to its storied history, the team is known for its unique traditions and rabid fan base, known as the "Bulldog Nation." Georgia has won over 900 games in its history, placing them 9th all-time in wins and has finished in the Top 10 of the AP Poll 30 times, 15 of which were Top 5 finishes.

== History ==
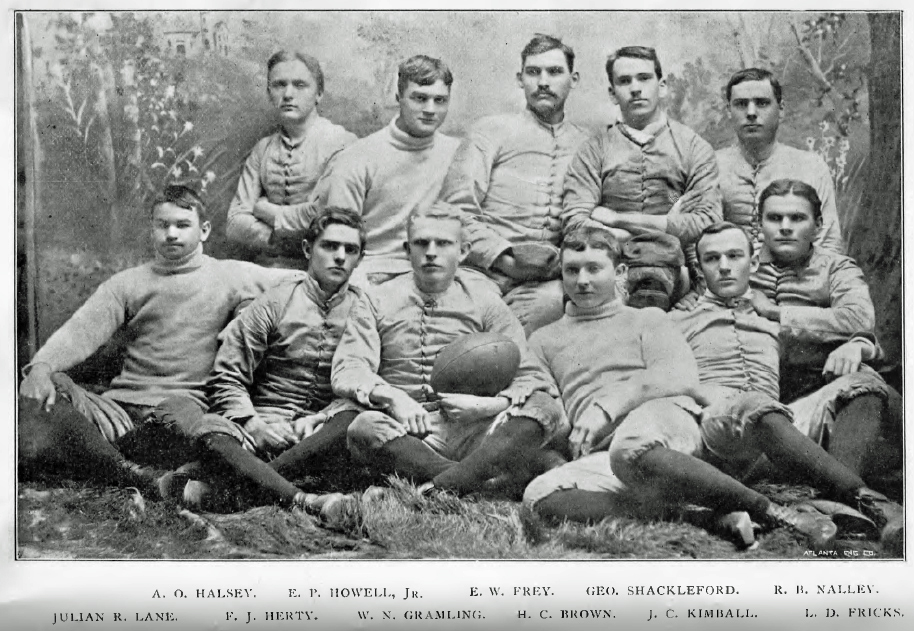
Georgia's first football team, 1892

Georgia's football program dates to 1892, when chemistry professor Dr. Charles Herty organized the university's first team and scheduled a game against Mercer, marking the first intercollegiate football contest played in the Deep South. Early seasons were marked by frequent coaching changes and modest success, though the Bulldogs achieved notable milestones under Glenn "Pop" Warner, including an undefeated season and a Southern Intercollegiate Athletic Association (SIAA) championship in 1896. The program survived a near shutdown following the death of player Richard Von Albade Gammon in 1897, after state legislation banning football was vetoed. By the 1910s and 1920s, Georgia had gained greater stability, producing All-Americans such as Bob McWhorter, moving from Herty Field to Sanford Field.

From 1939 to 1960, Wally Butts led Georgia through one of its most successful eras, winning four Southeastern Conference (SEC) titles while coaching Heisman Trophy winner Frank Sinkwich and All-American Charley Trippi. Vince Dooley followed as head coach from 1964 to 1988, becoming the longest-tenured coach in program history. Under Dooley, Georgia won the 1980 consensus national championship (following a 17–10 Sugar Bowl victory of Notre Dame), six SEC titles, and produced standout players including running back Herschel Walker (winner of the 1982 Heisman Trophy and Maxwell Award) and defensive tackle Bill Stanfill (1968 Outland Trophy winner). Dooley was inducted in the College Football Hall of Fame in 1997. Later decades included mixed results under Ray Goff and Jim Donnan, with Donnan's teams achieving consistent bowl success but failing to regain national prominence.

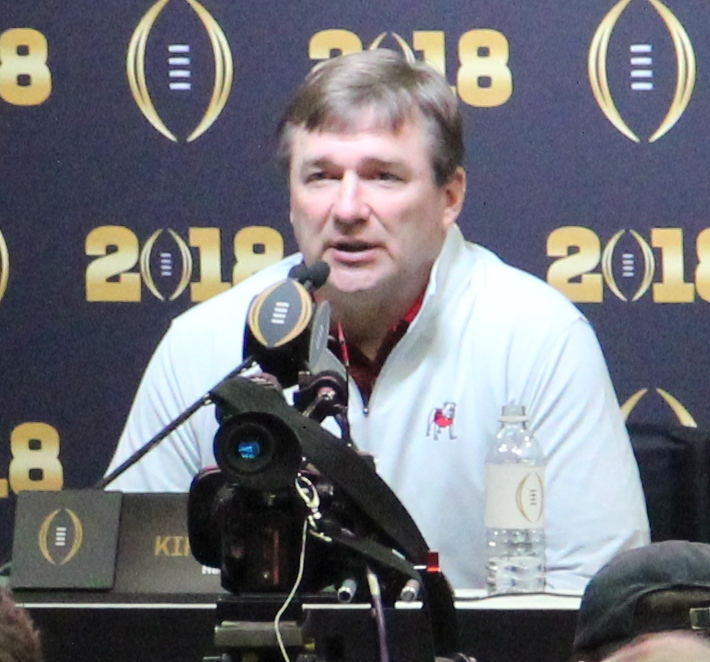
Kirby Smart (pictured in 2018)

Mark Richt coached the Bulldogs from 2001 to 2015, guiding the program to two SEC championships, multiple division titles, and sustained national relevance before parting ways with the university. UGA alumnus Kirby Smart, hired in 2015, ushered in a period of unprecedented dominance. Under Smart, Georgia reached the national championship game in his second season and won College Football Playoff national titles in the 2021 and 2022 seasons, becoming the first program to repeat as playoff-era champions. His teams also set records for postseason margin of victory (a 65–7 win over the TCU Horned Frogs (58-point difference) in the College Football Playoff National Championship following the 2022 season, which they broke with a 63–3 victory over the Florida State Seminoles in the 2023 Orange Bowl, establishing Georgia as one of the sport's leading programs in the modern era.

== Nicknames ==
The first mention of "Bulldogs" in association with Georgia athletics occurred on November 28, 1901, at the Georgia-Auburn football game played in Atlanta. The Georgia fans had a badge saying "Eat `em Georgia" and a picture of a bulldog tearing a piece of cloth; however, it was not until 1920 that the nickname "Bulldog" was used to describe the athletic teams at the University of Georgia. Traditionally, the choice of a Bulldog as the UGA mascot was attributed to the alma mater of its founder and first president, Abraham Baldwin, who graduated from Yale University. Prior to that time, Georgia teams were usually known as the "Red and Black." On November 3, 1920, Morgan Blake of the Atlanta Journal wrote a story about school nicknames and proposed:

The Georgia Bulldogs would sound good because there is a certain dignity about a bulldog, as well as ferocity.

After a 0–0 tie with Virginia in Charlottesville on Nov. 6, 1920, Atlanta Constitution writer Cliff Wheatley used the name "Bulldogs" in his story five times. The name has been used ever since.

== Conference affiliations ==
Georgia has been a member of the Southeastern Conference since its founding in 1932.

Georgia was a founding member of the Southern Intercollegiate Athletic Association (SIAA), one of the first collegiate athletic conferences formed in the United States. Georgia participated in the SIAA from its establishment in 1895 until 1921. During its tenure in the SIAA, Georgia was conference co-champion in two years, 1896 and 1920.

In 1921, the Bulldogs, along with 12 other teams, left the SIAA and formed the Southern Conference (SoCon). During its time in the Southern Conference, the team never won a conference championship. In 1932, the Georgia Bulldogs left the Southern Conference to form and join the SEC, where Georgia has won the second-most SEC football championships, with 15, behind Alabama (27).

- Independent (1891–1895)
- Southern Intercollegiate Athletic Association (1896–1921)
- Southern Conference (1922–1932)
- Southeastern Conference (1932–present)

== Championships ==
=== National championships ===
National Championship Celebration at Sanford Stadium in January 2022

Georgia has been selected eight times as national champions from NCAA-designated major selectors, including three (1980, 2021, 2022) from the major wire-service: AP Poll and/or Coaches' Poll. Georgia claims four national championships (1942, 1980, 2021, and 2022).

==== Claimed national championships ====
Year	Coach	Selector	Record	Bowl	Final AP	Final Coaches
1942	Wally Butts	Berryman, Billingsley, DeVold, Houlgate, Litkenhous, Poling, Sagarin, Sagarin (ELO-Chess), Williamson	11–1	Won Rose	No. 2	–
1980	Vince Dooley	AP, Coaches, FWAA, NFF^{†}	12–0	Won Sugar	No. 1	No. 1
2021	Kirby Smart	College Football Playoff^{††}	14–1	Won Orange (CFP Semifinal); Won CFP National Championship Game	No. 1	No. 1
2022	Kirby Smart	College Football Playoff	15–0	Won Peach (CFP Semifinal); Won CFP National Championship Game	No. 1	No. 1

† Other consensus selectors for 1980 included Berryman, Billingsley, Rothman, Football News, Helms, NCF, Poling, Sagarin (ELO-Chess), Sporting News
†† Other consensus selectors for 2021 include AP, FWAA/NFF, USAT/AMWAY (Coaches)

==== Unclaimed national championships ====
Year	Coach	Selector	Record	Bowl	Opponent	Result	Final AP	Final Coaches
1920	Herman Stegeman	Berryman	8–0–1	None			–	–
1927	George Cecil Woodruff	Berryman, Boand, Poling	9–1	None			–	–
1946	Wally Butts	Williamson	11–0	Sugar	North Carolina	W 20–0	No. 3	–
1968	Vince Dooley	Litkenhous	8–1–2	Sugar	Arkansas	L 2–16	No. 8	No. 4

Claimed national championship

- 1920 – First-year head Herman Stegeman led the program to its second undefeated season, outscored opponents 250–17.
- 1927 – Georgia's famous Dream and Wonder team led by George Woodruff went 9–1. This team was noted for having a win over 1920s power, Yale, in Connecticut. Georgia was ranked No. 1 going into its final game against rival Georgia Tech, where they were upset 12–0 in the rain. Even so, Georgia finished the season ranked No. 1 in two minor polls.
- 1942 – Georgia compiled an 11–1 record, shut out six of twelve opponents (including a 34–0 victory over No. 2 Georgia Tech), and defeated No. 13 UCLA in the 1943 Rose Bowl 9–0. Georgia finished No. 2 in the final AP Poll (Ohio State finished No. 1). The Bulldogs retroactively claimed the title in the late 1980s, after then-head coach and athletic director Vince Dooley discovered that the team was listed as a national champion in an NCAA record book.
- 1946 – Fueled by the return of Charley Trippi, the 1946 SEC Champion Bulldogs went 10–0, including a 20–10 win over North Carolina in the Sugar Bowl. Notre Dame finished the season ranked No. 1 in the majority of the polls, but the Williamson poll recognized Georgia as No. 1.
- 1968 – The 1968 Bulldogs won Vince Dooley's second SEC Championship as head coach, and finished the season undefeated. However the 8–0–2 Bulldogs tied twice, and then lost to Arkansas in the Sugar Bowl. The Litkenhous poll recognized them as National Champions.
- 1980 – The Bulldogs beat Notre Dame 17–10 in the Sugar Bowl to finish 12–0 and claim the national championship. Georgia finished No. 1 in the final AP and Coaches Polls.
- 2021 – The Bulldogs beat Alabama 33–18 in the CFP National Championship Game to finish at 14–1 and claim the national championship.
- 2022 – The Bulldogs beat TCU 65–7 in the CFP National Championship Game to finish 15–0 for the first time in school history and claim the national championship.

=== Conference championships ===
Georgia has won a total of 18 conference championships, twelve outright and five shared. The school's 16 Southeastern Conference Championships rank it second all time in SEC history, behind only Alabama.

Year	Conference	Coach	Overall record	Conference record
1896†	SIAA	Glenn "Pop" Warner	4–0	3–0
1920†	SIAA	Herman Stegeman	8–0–1	8–0
1942	SEC	Wally Butts	11–1	6–1
1946†	SEC	Wally Butts	11–0	5–0
1948	SEC	Wally Butts	9–2	6–0
1959	SEC	Wally Butts	10–1	7–0
1966†	SEC	Vince Dooley	10–1	6–0
1968	SEC	Vince Dooley	8–1–2	5–0–1
1976	SEC	Vince Dooley	10–2	5–1
1980	SEC	Vince Dooley	12–0	6–0
1981†	SEC	Vince Dooley	10–2	6–0
1982	SEC	Vince Dooley	11–1	6–0
2002	SEC	Mark Richt	13–1	7–1
2005	SEC	Mark Richt	10–3	6–2
2017	SEC	Kirby Smart	13–2	7–1
2022	SEC	Kirby Smart	15–0	8–0
2024	SEC	Kirby Smart	11–2	6–2
2025	SEC	Kirby Smart	12-1	7–1

† Co-champions

=== Division championships ===
From 1992 through 2023, the SEC was divided into two divisions, the East and the West. Division champions were the representatives to the SEC Championship Game. Georgia won 13 SEC Eastern Division championships, and made 11 appearances during the divisional era. The Dawgs were 4–7 in those games. Twice, in 1992 and 2007, Georgia was the Eastern Division co-champion, but lost a tiebreaker for the right to appear in the championship game.

Year	Division	SEC CG Opponent	Result
1992†	SEC East	N/A lost tiebreaker to Florida	
2002	SEC East	Arkansas	W 30–3
2003†	SEC East	LSU	L 13–34
2005	SEC East	LSU	W 34–14
2007†	SEC East	N/A lost tiebreaker to Tennessee	
2011	SEC East	LSU	L 10–42
2012†	SEC East	Alabama	L 28–32
2017	SEC East	Auburn	W 28–7
2018	SEC East	Alabama	L 28–35
2019	SEC East	LSU	L 10–37
2021	SEC East	Alabama	L 24–41
2022	SEC East	LSU	W 50–30
2023	SEC East	Alabama	L 24–27

† Co-champions

== Bowl games ==
The Bulldogs have played in 64 bowl games, second all-time. UGA has a bowl record of 38–23–3. Their 38 wins rank the Dawgs second all-time in bowl wins. They have played in a record 18 different bowls including appearances in five of the New Year's Six Bowl Games (2 Rose, 5 Orange, 3 Cotton, 7 Peach, and 13 Sugar Bowls) and appearances in the 2018, 2022, and 2023 College Football Playoff National Championship.

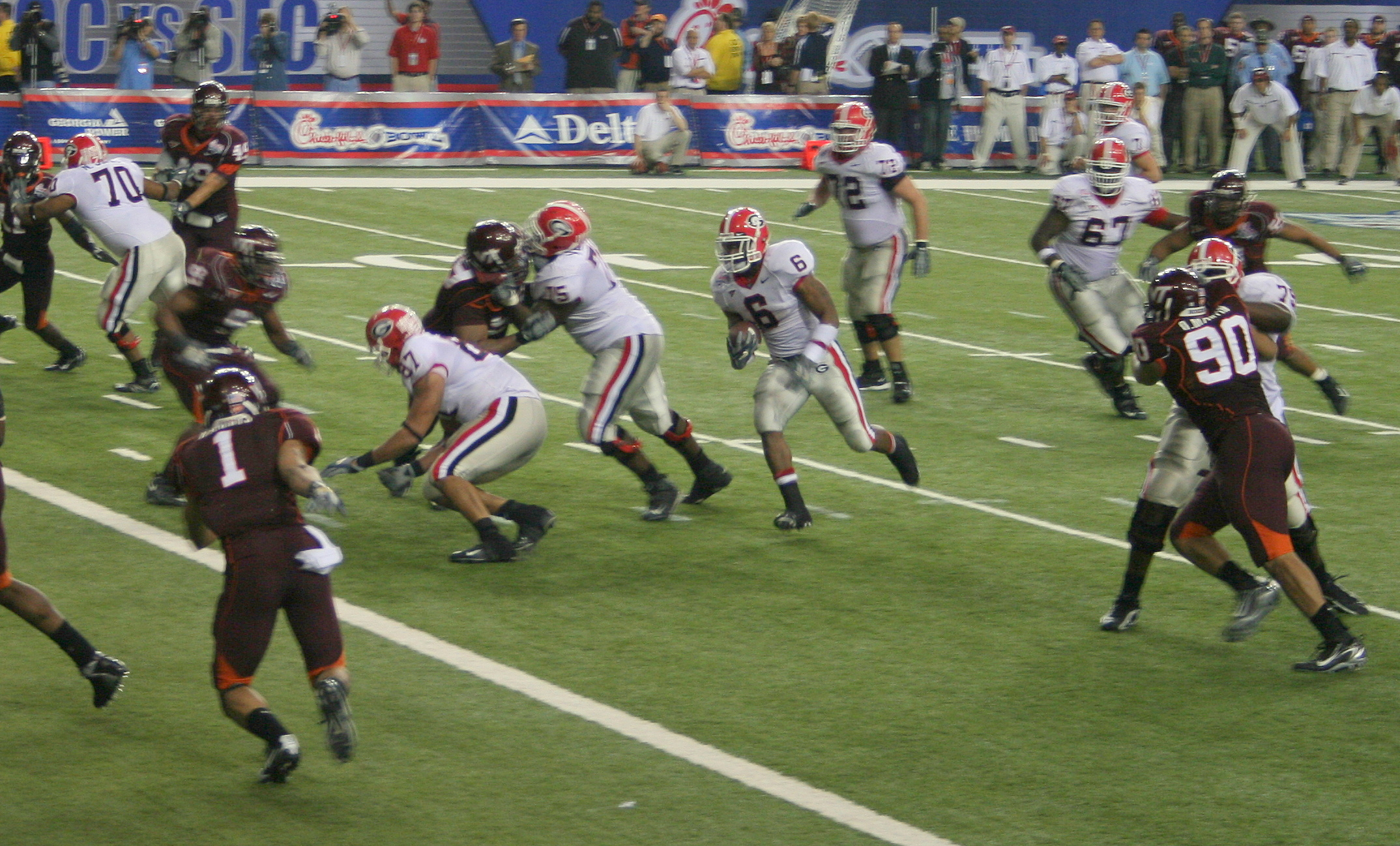
2006 Chick-fil-A Bowl.

Season	Coach	Bowl	Opponent	Result
1941	Wally Butts	Orange Bowl	TCU	W 40–26
1942	Wally Butts	Rose Bowl	UCLA	W 9–0
1945	Wally Butts	Oil Bowl	Tulsa	W 20–6
1946	Wally Butts	Sugar Bowl	North Carolina	W 20–10
1947	Wally Butts	Gator Bowl	Maryland	T 20–20
1948	Wally Butts	Orange Bowl	Texas	L 28–41
1950	Wally Butts	Presidential Cup Bowl	Texas A&M	L 20–40
1959	Wally Butts	Orange Bowl	Missouri	W 14–0
1964	Vince Dooley	Sun Bowl	Texas Tech	W 7–0
1966	Vince Dooley	Cotton Bowl Classic	SMU	W 24–9
1967	Vince Dooley	Liberty Bowl	NC State	L 7–14
1968	Vince Dooley	Sugar Bowl	Arkansas	L 2–16
1969	Vince Dooley	Sun Bowl	Nebraska	L 6–45
1971	Vince Dooley	Gator Bowl	North Carolina	W 7–3
1973	Vince Dooley	Peach Bowl	Maryland	W 17–16
1974	Vince Dooley	Tangerine Bowl	Miami	L 10–21
1975	Vince Dooley	Cotton Bowl Classic	Arkansas	L 10–31
1976	Vince Dooley	Sugar Bowl	Pittsburgh	L 3–27
1978	Vince Dooley	Astro-Bluebonnet Bowl	Stanford	L 22–25
1980	Vince Dooley	Sugar Bowl	Notre Dame	W 17–10
1981	Vince Dooley	Sugar Bowl	Pittsburgh	L 20–24
1982	Vince Dooley	Sugar Bowl	Penn State	L 23–27
1983	Vince Dooley	Cotton Bowl Classic	Texas	W 10–9
1984	Vince Dooley	Citrus Bowl	Florida State	T 17–17
1985	Vince Dooley	Sun Bowl	Arizona	T 13–13
1986	Vince Dooley	Hall of Fame Bowl	Boston College	L 24–27
1987	Vince Dooley	Liberty Bowl	Arkansas	W 20–17
1988	Vince Dooley	Gator Bowl	Michigan State	W 34–27
1989	Ray Goff	Peach Bowl	Syracuse	L 18–19
1991	Ray Goff	Independence Bowl	Arkansas	W 24–15
1992	Ray Goff	Florida Citrus Bowl	Ohio State	W 21–14
1995	Ray Goff	Peach Bowl	Virginia	L 27–34
1997	Jim Donnan	Outback Bowl	Wisconsin	W 33–6
1998	Jim Donnan	Peach Bowl	Virginia	W 35–33
1999	Jim Donnan	Outback Bowl	Purdue	W 28–25 ^{OT}
2000	Jim Donnan	Oahu Bowl	Virginia	W 37–14
2001	Mark Richt	Music City Bowl	Boston College	L 16–20
2002	Mark Richt	Sugar Bowl	Florida State	W 26–13
2003	Mark Richt	Capital One Bowl	Purdue	W 34–27 ^{OT}
2004	Mark Richt	Outback Bowl	Wisconsin	W 24–21
2005	Mark Richt	Sugar Bowl	West Virginia	L 35–38
2006	Mark Richt	Chick-fil-A Bowl	Virginia Tech	W 31–24
2007	Mark Richt	Sugar Bowl	Hawaii	W 41–10
2008	Mark Richt	Capital One Bowl	Michigan State	W 24–12
2009	Mark Richt	Independence Bowl	Texas A&M	W 44–20
2010	Mark Richt	Liberty Bowl	Central Florida	L 6–10
2011	Mark Richt	Outback Bowl	Michigan State	L 30–33 ^{3OT}
2012	Mark Richt	Capital One Bowl	Nebraska	W 45–31
2013	Mark Richt	Gator Bowl	Nebraska	L 19–24
2014	Mark Richt	Belk Bowl	Louisville	W 37–14
2015	Bryan McClendon (interim)	TaxSlayer Bowl	Penn State	W 24–17
2016	Kirby Smart	Liberty Bowl	TCU	W 31–23
2017	Kirby Smart	Rose Bowl (CFP Semifinal) †	Oklahoma	W 54–48 ^{2OT}
2017	Kirby Smart	CFP National Championship	Alabama	L 23–26 ^{OT}
2018	Kirby Smart	Sugar Bowl †	Texas	L 21–28
2019	Kirby Smart	Sugar Bowl †	Baylor	W 26–14
2020	Kirby Smart	Peach Bowl †	Cincinnati	W 24–21
2021	Kirby Smart	Orange Bowl (CFP Semifinal) †	Michigan	W 34–11
2021	Kirby Smart	CFP National Championship	Alabama	W 33–18
2022	Kirby Smart	Peach Bowl (CFP Semifinal) †	Ohio State	W 42–41
2022	Kirby Smart	CFP National Championship	TCU	W 65–7
2023	Kirby Smart	Orange Bowl †	Florida State	W 63–3
2024	Kirby Smart	Sugar Bowl (CFP Quarterfinal) †	Notre Dame	L 10–23
2025	Kirby Smart	Sugar Bowl (CFP Quarterfinal) †	Ole Miss	L 34–39

†CFP/New Year's Six game

Georgia Bulldog bowl games: all-time records by bowl
Bowl	Record	Appearances	Last	Winning %
Duke's Mayo Bowl (played game under Belk Bowl title)	1–0	1	2014 season	1.000
Bluebonnet Bowl (defunct)	0–1	1	1978 season	.000
Citrus Bowl (played game under Tangerine Bowl, Citrus Bowl, and Capital One Bowl titles)	4–1–1	6	2012 season	.750
Chick-fil-A Peach Bowl	5–2	7	2022 season	.714
Cotton Bowl Classic	2–1	3	1983 season	.667
Independence Bowl	2–0	2	2009 season	1.000
Liberty Bowl	2–2	4	2016 season	.500
Music City Bowl	0–1	1	2001 season	.000
Oahu Bowl (defunct)	1–0	1	2000 season	1.000
Oil Bowl (defunct)	1–0	1	1945 season	1.000
Outback Bowl (played games under Hall of Fame Bowl and Outback Bowl titles)	3–2	5	2011 season	.600
Orange Bowl	4–1	5	2023 season	.800
Presidential Cup Bowl (defunct)	0–1	1	1950 season	.000
Rose Bowl	2–0	2	2017 season	1.000
Sugar Bowl	5–9	14	2025 season	.357
Sun Bowl	1–1–1	3	1985 season	.500
Gator Bowl (played games under Gator Bowl and Taxslayer Bowl titles)	3–1–1	5	2015 season	.600

== Head coaches ==
Head coaches of the Bulldogs dating from 1892.

No.	Name	Seasons	Record	Pct.
1	Charles Herty	1892	1–1	.500
2	Ernest Brown	1893	2–2–1	.500
3	Robert Winston	1894	5–1	.833
4	Pop Warner	1895–1896	7–4	.636
5	Charles McCarthy	1897–1898	6–3	.667
6	Gordon Saussy	1899	2–3–1	.417
7	E. E. Jones	1900	2–4	.333
8	William Ayres Reynolds	1901–1902	5–7–3	.433
9, 11	Marvin D. Dickinson	1903, 1905	4–9	.308
10	Charles A. Barnard	1904	1–5	.167
12	George S. Whitney	1906–1907	6–7–2	.467
13	Branch Bocock	1908	5–2–1	.688
14 & 15	Joseph Coulter & Frank Dobson	1909	1–4–2	.286
16	W. A. Cunningham	1910–1919	43–18–9	.656
17	Herman Stegeman	1920–1922	20–6–3	.741
18	George Cecil Woodruff	1923–1927	30–16–1	.649
19	Harry Mehre	1928–1937	59–34–6	.626
20	Joel Hunt	1938	5–4–1	.550
21	Wally Butts	1939–1960	140–86–9	.615
22	Johnny Griffith	1961–1963	10–16–4	.400
23	Vince Dooley	1964–1988	201–77–10	.715
24	Ray Goff	1989–1995	46–34–1	.574
25	Jim Donnan	1996–2000	40–19	.678
26	Mark Richt	2001–2015	145–51	.740
27	Kirby Smart	2016–present	117–21	.848

=== Coaching awards ===
- Amos Alonzo Stagg Award

Vince Dooley – 2001

- Paul "Bear" Bryant Award

Vince Dooley – 1980

- Broyles Award

Brian VanGorder – 2003

- College Football Hall of Fame
  - Glenn "Pop" Warner, inducted in 1951
  - Joel Hunt, inducted in 1967
  - Wally Butts, inducted in 1997
  - Vince Dooley, inducted in 1995

=== Personnel ===
==== Coaching staff ====
Georgia Bulldogs
Name	Position	Consecutive season at Georgia in current position	Previous position
Mike Bobo	Offensive coordinator / quarterbacks	2nd	Georgia – Offensive Analyst (2022)
Josh Crawford	Run game coordinator / running backs	1st	Georgia Tech – Wide receivers (2023)
James Coley	Wide receivers	1st	Texas A&M – Co-offensive coordinator / tight ends (2022–2023)
Todd Hartley	Tight ends	6th	Miami – Tight ends / special teams coordinator (2016–2018)
Stacy Searels	Offensive line	3rd	North Carolina – Offensive line (2019–2021)
Travaris Robinson	Co-defensive coordinator / safeties	1st	Alabama – Cornerbacks (2022–2023)
Glenn Schumann	Co-defensive coordinator / inside linebackers	6th	Georgia – Inside linebackers (2016–2018)
Tray Scott	Defensive line	8th	North Carolina – Defensive line (2015–2016)
Chidera Uzo–Diribe	Outside linebackers	3rd	SMU – Defensive line (2021)
Donte Williams	Defensive backs	1st	USC – Defensive backs (2020–2023)
Kirk Benedict	Special teams coordinator	1st	Georgia – Special teams analyst (2022–2023)
Scott Sinclair	Director of strength & conditioning	9th	Marshall – Director of strength & conditioning (2013–2015)

== Traditions ==
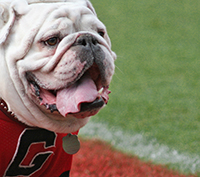
Uga VI Official Photo

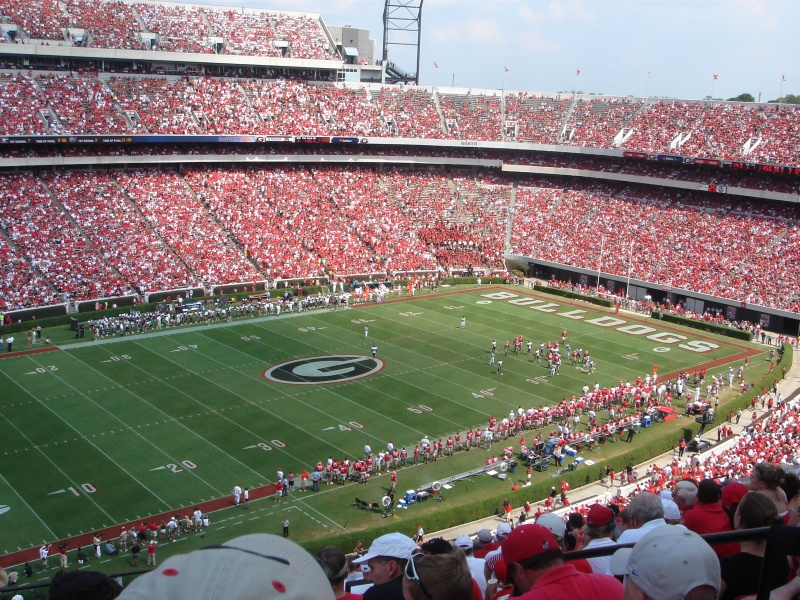
Sanford Stadium

- "Between the Hedges" Legendary sports writer Grantland Rice coined the term that famously describes the home of the Bulldogs in the 1930s in reference to the famous English privet hedges that have surrounded the Sanford Stadium turf since its inaugural game against Yale in 1929. The original hedges were removed in 1996 in preparation for the women's soccer matches hosted at Sanford Stadium for the 1996 Centennial Olympic Games. Offshoots of the original hedges were planted shortly after the games. The Hedges also serve as a crowd control measure, as they contain a fence inside of them. In fact, only once have Georgia fans been able to rush the field, that following a victory over Tennessee in 2000.
- Uga (pronounced UH-guh) is the name of a lineage of white Bulldogs which have served as the mascot of the University of Georgia since 1956. The current mascot, "Boom", officially took the role of Uga XI in April 2023, replacing Uga X. Deceased Ugas are interred in a mausoleum near the main entrance to Sanford Stadium. Georgia is the only school to bury its past mascots inside the football stadium.
- Glory, Glory is the rally song for the Georgia Bulldogs and was sung at football games as early as the 1890s. The rally song was arranged in its current form by Georgia professor Hugh Hodgson in 1915. While "Glory, Glory" is the most commonly played Georgia song, the school's official fight song is "Hail To Georgia" which is played after field goals.
- The ringing of the Chapel Bell after a Georgia victory started in the 1890s when the playing field was located near the chapel and freshmen were compelled to ring the chapel's bell until midnight to celebrate the victory. Today, freshmen are no longer required to do the chore, with students, alumni, and fans taking their place.
- "The Battle Hymn of the Bulldog Nation" is a slowed down version of The Battle Hymn of the Republic arranged in 1987 and is a hallowed song played pregame and postgame by the Redcoat Band. A lone trumpeter in the southwest corner of Sanford Stadium plays the first few notes, after which the entire band joins in and a video montage, narrated by longtime Georgia radio broadcaster Larry Munson, is played that highlights the many great moments of Georgia football history. It is custom for fans to stand, remove their hats, and point towards the lone trumpeter as he plays the initial notes. This tradition is considered the climax of the Redcoat Band pregame show and was introduced before the 2000 season.
- "How 'bout them Dawgs" is a slogan of recent vintage that first surfaced in the late 1970s and has become a battle cry of Bulldog fans. The slogan received national attention and exposure when Georgia won the national championship in 1980 and wire services proclaimed "how 'bout them dogs".
- Silver britches – When Wally Butts was named head coach in 1939, he changed the uniform by adding silver-colored pants to the bright-red jersey already in use. The "silver britches" became very popular, and were a source of multiple fan chants and sign references over the years, the most well-known being "Go You Silver Britches". When he was hired in 1964, Vince Dooley changed Georgia's uniform to use white pants, but reinstated the silver pants prior to Georgia's 1980 national championship season. Georgia's use of the "silver britches" continues to the present day.
- The "Dawg Walk" is a tradition that features the football players walking through a gathering of fans and the Redcoat Band near the Tate Student Center as they enter Sanford Stadium. Vince Dooley began the tradition, originally leading the team into the stadium from the East Campus Road side. Ray Goff changed the Dawg Walk to its current location in the 1990s, but eventually discontinued the practice altogether. Mark Richt revived it starting with the 2001 season, and it continues to the present day.
- "Light Up Sanford" is a newly-formed tradition that involves home fans at Sanford Stadium turning on their phone flashlights before the start of the fourth quarter, when the Georgia Redcoat Marching Band plays the song "Krypton".

=== Uniforms ===
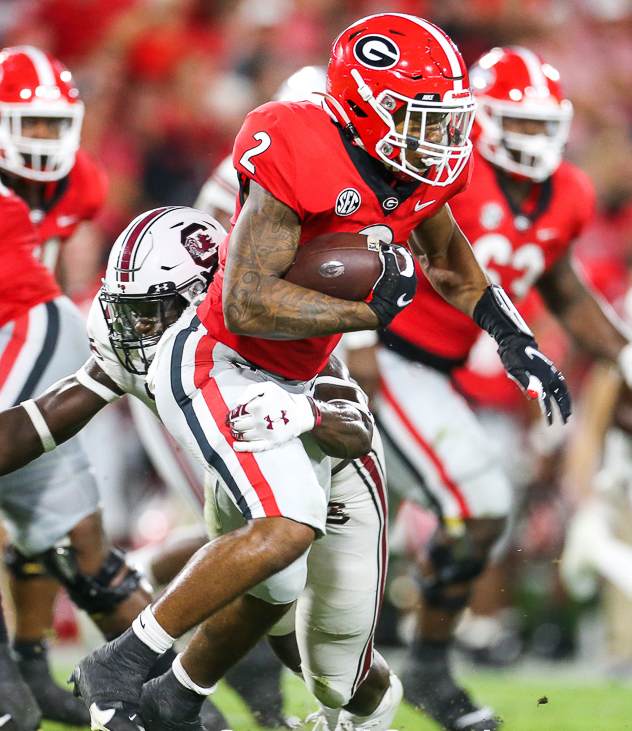
Kendall Milton wearing Georgia's home uniform, 2021

Georgia players wearing the team's first full white uniforms during the 2026 whiteout game.

Georgia's standard home uniform has not significantly changed since 1980, and consists of a red helmet with the trademarked oval G, red jerseys, and famous silver britches.

Wally Butts first introduced the "silver britches", as they are colloquially known, in 1939. When Vince Dooley became Georgia's head coach, he changed the team's home uniform to include white pants. The uniform was changed back to silver pants prior to the 1980 season, and has remained silver ever since.

Georgia's earliest helmet was grey leather, to which a red block "G" logo was added in 1961. The shirts were usually red, sometimes with various striping patterns. Their uniforms in the pre-World War II era varied at times, sometimes significantly. Photographic evidence suggests that black shirts, vests, and stripes of various patterns were worn at times over the years.

Vince Dooley was the first to incorporate the oval "G" onto the helmet in 1964, as part of uniform changes that included adoption of a red helmet and white pants. Anne Donaldson, who graduated from Georgia with a BFA in commercial art and was married to Georgia assistant coach John Donaldson, was asked by Dooley to come up with a new helmet design to replace the previous silver helmet. Dooley liked the forward oriented stylized "G" Donaldson produced, and it was adopted by him. Since the Georgia "G" was similar to the Green Bay Packers' "G" already in use since 1961, Dooley cleared its use with the Packers organization. The Packers hold the trademark on the "G" logo, and have granted limited permission to Georgia and Grambling State University to utilize a similar logo.

Prior to the 1980 season, the "silver britches" were re-added to Georgia's uniform with a red-white-black stripe down the side. Since the 1980 season, Georgia has utilized the same basic uniform concept. The sleeve stripes, trim colors, and font on Georgia's home and away jerseys have varied many times, but the home jerseys have remained generally red with white numbers, and away jerseys have remained generally white with black numbers.

The most recent trim redesign occurred in 2005, when sleeve stripe patterns were dropped in favor of solid black jersey cuffs on the home jersey and solid red cuffs on the away jersey. Matte gray pants have also been used at times instead of "true" silver since 2004, mainly because the matte gray pants are of a lighter material.

One of the things that make Georgia's uniform unique is its relative longevity, and the fact that it has very rarely changed over the years. There have been occasions, however, when alternate uniforms have been worn.

- Red pants were used instead of silver as part of Georgia's away uniform at various times during the 1980s and were worn as a "throwback" alternate uniform in 2020.
- Black facemasks and a white-black-white helmet stripe were worn during the 1991 Independence Bowl.
- Black pants were used instead of silver as part of Georgia's away uniform (Georgia chose to wear white as the designated home team) during the 1998 Outback Bowl and home uniform during the 1998 Florida game.
- Black jerseys were worn instead of red as part of Georgia's home uniform in games against Auburn and Hawaii during the 2007 season, in 2008 against Alabama, 2016 against Louisiana-Lafayette and 2020 vs. Mississippi State. Georgia also wore black jerseys as the visiting team in the 2021 Peach Bowl vs. Cincinnati, which wore red jerseys.
- A unique away uniform was worn against Florida in 2009. This uniform included black helmets with red facemasks, a white stripe, and the traditional oval "G" logo; white jerseys with black numbers; and black pants.
- For the 2011 Chick-fil-A Kickoff Game against Boise State in the Georgia Dome, Georgia wore a Nike Pro Combat uniform that was significantly different from its traditional home uniforms. The uniforms used a non-traditional matte-finish red color and featured silver helmets with a large red stripe and the traditional oval "G" logo, black facemasks with a red stripe mirroring the stripe on the helmet, two-tone red jerseys with black sleeves, trim, and numbers, the word "Georgia" on the back of the jerseys instead of players' names, red pants, and black socks.
- For the 2026 season, Georgia introduced its first full white uniforms, debuting them during the team's whiteout game against Western Kentucky. The uniforms represented a significant departure from Georgia's traditional home uniforms and featured white helmets with the silver britches stripe and traditional oval "G" logo, white facemasks, traditional away white jerseys, and white pants with the silver britches stripe.

== Rivalries ==
The Bulldogs have three main football rivals: Auburn, Florida, and Georgia Tech. All three rivalries were first contested over 100 years ago, though the series records are disputed in two cases. Georgia does not include two games from 1943 and 1944 against Georgia Tech (both UGA losses) in its reckoning of the series record, because Georgia's players were in World War II and Georgia Tech's players were not. Georgia also includes a game against one of the four predecessor institutions of the modern University of Florida in 1904 (a Georgia win) that national sportswriters and Florida's athletic association do not include.

Georgia has long-standing football rivalries with other universities as well, with over 50 games against five additional teams. Georgia developed rivalries with the Tennessee Volunteers and South Carolina Gamecocks during divisional play in the SEC East from 1992 to 2023. In 2025, South Carolina, along with Florida and Auburn, was named one of Georgia's annual conference opponents until at least 2029. From 1944 to 1965, the Bulldogs played each season against the Alabama Crimson Tide. While the two bordering schools no longer play annually, they have faced off against each other in four SEC Championship Games and two College Football Playoff National Championships since 2010, bringing the once dormant rivalry back to prominence.

=== Auburn ===
Georgia's oldest and longest-running rivalry is the series with Auburn, which dates to 1892. As it is the oldest rivalry still contested between teams in the South, the series is referred to by both schools as the "Deep South's Oldest Rivalry". Although historically close (the series was tied as recently as the 2014 matchup), Georgia has won 17 out of the last 20 matchups, including the last eight, and leads the series 65–56–8 through the 2025 season.

=== Clemson ===
Although no longer contested annually, the series with Clemson dates to 1897. The two schools are separated by a mere 70 miles and played annually from 1962 to 1987. The rivalry took on national importance in the early 1980s, when both Georgia and Clemson won national titles and were consistently highly ranked. The rivalry is renewed on an intermittent basis, with the next matchup scheduled in 2029. Georgia leads the series 44–18–4 after the matchup in the 2025 season.

=== Florida ===
Played annually (except for two occasions) at the neutral-site of Jacksonville, Florida since 1933, the Georgia–Florida rivalry is known nationwide for its associated tailgating and pageantry, being referred to as "The World's Largest Outdoor Cocktail Party", although that name is no longer used officially. The Georgia–Florida rivalry annually carries importance in the SEC race as the two schools have combined for 23 appearances in the SEC Championship game. The series record is disputed, with Georgia claiming a lead of 58–44–2 through the 2025 season (though Florida does not count their 1904 meetup, which Georgia won).

=== Georgia Tech ===
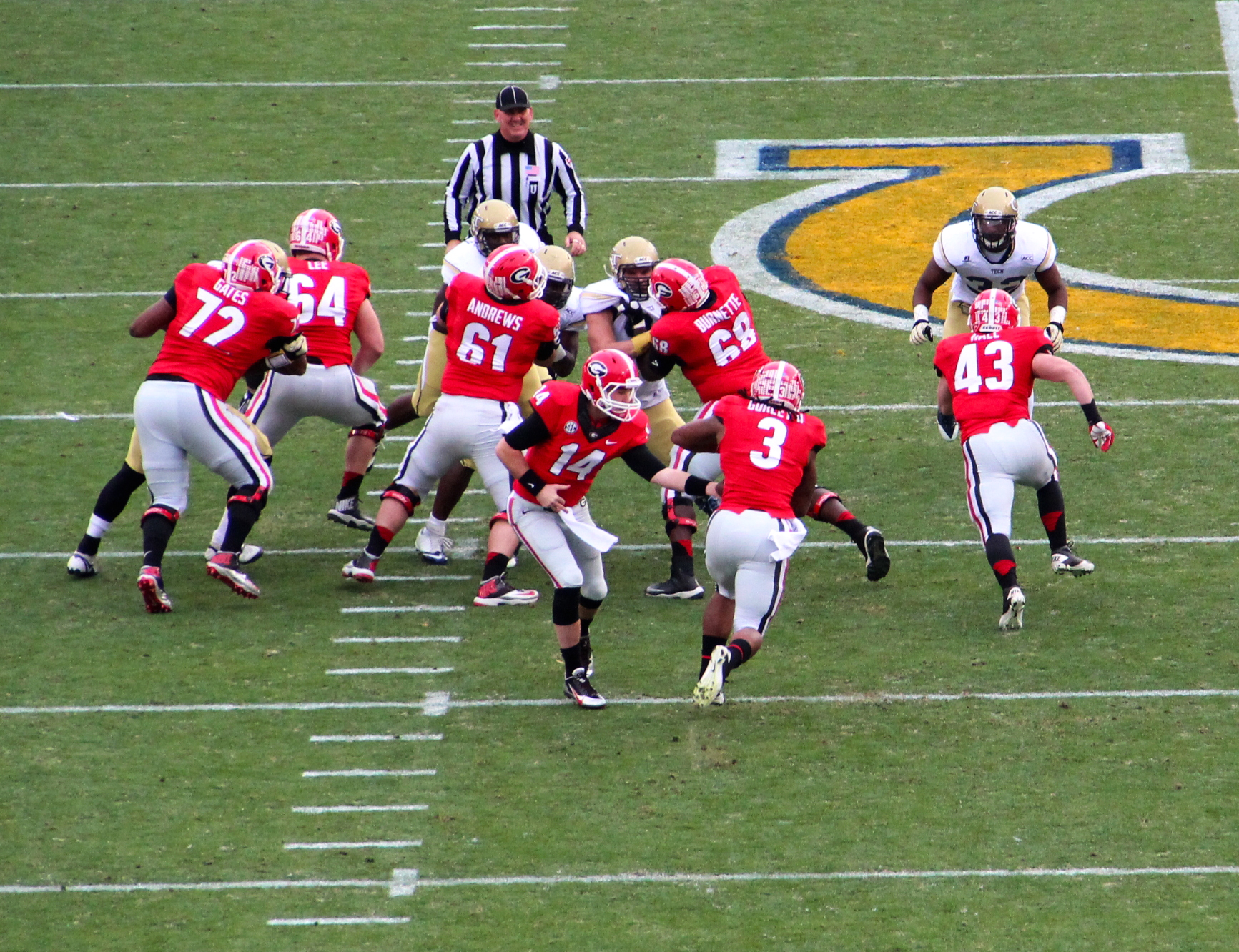
Georgia vs Georgia Tech, November 30, 2013

Dating to 1893, the series with the in-state Georgia Tech Yellow Jackets has traditionally been played as the final regular season game of the season and was historically Georgia's most important and fierce rivalry. Since the 2000s, Georgia has dominated the series, winning 18 out of 21 matchups, lessening the importance of the once-close series. Georgia leads the series 73–41–5 through the 2025 season.

=== South Carolina ===
The series with South Carolina dates to 1894. The border-rivalry gained importance when South Carolina joined the SEC in 1992, and gained intensity when former Florida coach, Steve Spurrier, coached the Gamecocks from 2006 to 2015. Georgia leads the series 55–19–2 through the 2023 season. The schools paused their annual series for 2024 and 2025.

=== Tennessee ===
The series with Tennessee dates to 1899. An annual rivalry began in 1992 upon the creation of the SEC Eastern Division and played an important role in deciding the division champion until divisions were eliminated beginning with the 2024 season. Georgia and Tennessee are the third and second winningest pre-expansion SEC programs behind only Alabama. Georgia leads the series 30–23–2 through the 2025 season. Beginning in 2026, the rivalry will no longer be played annually, however, the two schools will still meet every other season.

=== Vanderbilt ===
The series with Vanderbilt dates to 1893. Georgia leads the series 61–20–2 through the 2023 season.

=== Alabama ===
The series with Alabama dates to 1895. Alabama leads the series 45–27–4 through the 2025 season.

== Players ==
=== National award winners ===
- Heisman Trophy

Frank Sinkwich – 1942
Herschel Walker – 1982

- Maxwell Award

Charley Trippi – 1946
Herschel Walker – 1982

- Walter Camp Award

Herschel Walker – 1982

- Bronko Nagurski Trophy

Champ Bailey – 1998

- Butkus Award

Roquan Smith – 2017
Nakobe Dean – 2021
Jalon Walker - 2024

- Chuck Bednarik Award

David Pollack – 2004
Jordan Davis – 2021

- Doak Walker Award

Garrison Hearst – 1992

- Draddy Trophy

Matt Stinchcomb – 1998

- ESPY Award for Best College Football Player

Garrison Hearst – 1992

- Jim Thorpe Award

Deandre Baker – 2018

- Lombardi Award

David Pollack – 2004

- Lott Trophy

David Pollack – 2004

- Lou Groza Award

Rodrigo Blankenship – 2019

- Outland Trophy

Bill Stanfill – 1968
Jordan Davis – 2021

- Ted Hendricks Award

David Pollack – 2003, 2004

- Ray Guy Award

Drew Butler – 2009
Brett Thorson – 2025

- Paul Hornung Award

Brandon Boykin – 2011

- John Mackey Award

Brock Bowers – 2022, 2023

- Burlsworth Trophy

Stetson Bennett – 2022

- Manning Award

Stetson Bennett – 2022

- Wuerffel Trophy

Ladd McConkey – 2023

=== All-Americans ===
The Bulldogs have had 84 players selected to the All-America team through the 2019 season. Through the 2025 season, there have been 42 consensus selections of which 16 were unanimous.

While several players were selected in more than one year, only Frank Sinkwich, Herschel Walker, David Pollack, and Jarvis Jones were selected as consensus All-Americans more than once.

- Bob McWhorter, HB 1913
- David Paddock, QB 1914
- Joe Bennett, T 1922, 1923
- Chick Shiver, E 1927
- Tom Nash, E 1927†
- Herb Maffett, E 1930
- Red Maddox, G 1930
- Vernon Smith, E 1931†
- John Bond, HB 1935
- Bill Hartman, FB 1937
- Frank Sinkwich, HB 1941†, 1942‡
- George Poschner, E 1942
- Mike Castronis, T 1945
- Charley Trippi, TB 1946‡
- Herb St. John, G 1946
- Dan Edwards, E 1947
- John Rauch, QB 1948
- Harry Babcock, E 1952
- Zeke Bratkowski, QB 1952, 1953
- Johnny Carson, E 1953
- Pat Dye, G 1959, 1960
- Fran Tarkenton, QB 1960
- Jim Wilson, T 1964
- Ray Rissmiller, T 1964
- George Patton, DT 1965
- Edgar Chandler, OG 1966, 1967†
- Lynn Hughes, S 1966
- Jake Scott, S 1968†
- Bill Stanfill, DT 1968†
- Steve Greer, DG 1969
- Tom Lyons, C 1969, 1970
- Royce Smith, OG 1971‡
- Craig Hertwig, OT 1974
- Randy Johnson, OG 1975†
- Mike "Moonpie" Wilson, OT 1976
- Joel Parrish, OG 1976†
- Ben Zambiasi, LB 1976
- Allan Leavitt, K 1976
- George Collins, OG 1977
- Bill Krug, ROV 1977
- Rex Robinson, K 1979, 1980
- Scott Woerner, CB 1980
- Herschel Walker, TB 1980‡, 1981‡, 1982‡
- Terry Hoage, ROV 1982†, 1983†
- Jimmy Payne, DT 1982
- Freddie Gilbert, DE 1983
- Kevin Butler, PK 1983, 1984†
- Jeff Sanchez, S 1984†
- Peter Anderson, C 1985†
- John Little, S 1986
- Wilbur Strozier, OT 1986
- Tim Worley, TB 1988†
- Troy Sadowski, TE 1988
- Garrison Hearst, TB 1992‡
- Bernard Williams OT 1993
- Eric Zeier, QB 1994
- Matt Stinchcomb, OT 1997, 1998†
- Champ Bailey, CB 1998†
- Richard Seymour, DT 2000
- Boss Bailey, LB 2002
- David Pollack, DE 2002†, 2003, 2004†
- Jon Stinchcomb, OT 2002
- Sean Jones, ROV 2003
- Thomas Davis, FS 2004†
- Greg Blue, FS 2005†
- Max Jean-Gilles, OG 2005†
- Knowshon Moreno, TB 2008
- Drew Butler, P 2009‡
- Justin Houston, LB 2010
- Bacarri Rambo, FS 2011
- Orson Charles, TE 2011
- Ben Jones, C 2011
- Jarvis Jones, LB 2011†, 2012‡
- Roquan Smith, LB 2017‡
- Lamont Gaillard, C 2018
- Deandre Baker, CB 2018†
- Andrew Thomas, OT 2018, 2019‡
- Rodrigo Blankenship, K 2019
- J. R. Reed, S 2019†
- Eric Stokes, CB 2020
- Brock Bowers, TE 2021, 2022, 2023‡
- Lewis Cine, SS 2021
- Jordan Davis, DL 2021‡
- Nakobe Dean, LB 2021‡
- Jalen Carter, DL 2022‡
- Christopher Smith II, DB 2022‡
- Malaki Starks, DB 2023†
- CJ Allen (American football), LB 2025†

† Consensus All-American
‡ Consensus All-American that was selected by a unanimous vote

== Retired numbers ==
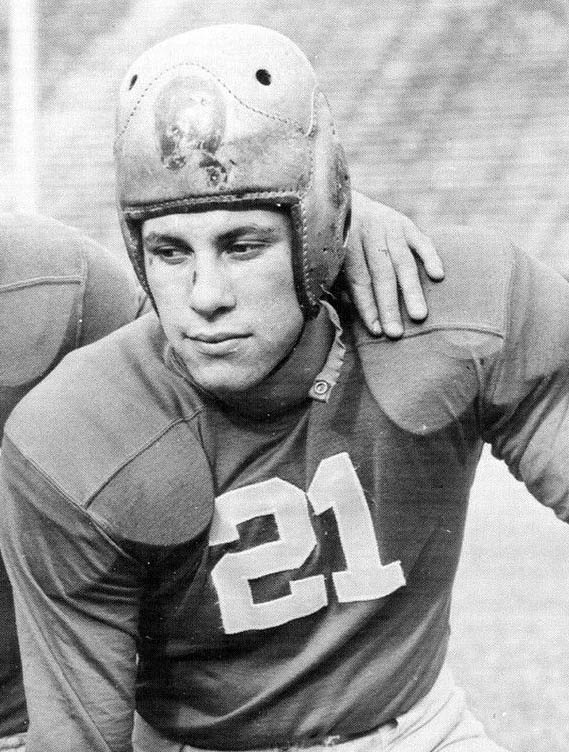
Frank Sinkwich (#21), pictured in the 1940s

Georgia Bulldogs retired numbers
No.	Player	Pos.	Tenure	Year retired	Ref.
21	Frank Sinkwich	HB	1941–1943	1943	
34	Herschel Walker	RB	1980–1982	1985	
40	Theron Sapp	RB	1955–1958	1959	
62	Charley Trippi	HB	1942, 1945–1946	1947	

== Hall of Fame inductees ==
=== Pro Football Hall of Fame ===
Five former Georgia players have been inducted into the Pro Football Hall of Fame.

Name	Position	Career	Induction
Charley Trippi	HB	1942, 1945–1946	1968
Fran Tarkenton	QB	1958–1960	1986
Terrell Davis	RB	1991–1994	2017
Champ Bailey	CB	1996–1998	2019
Richard Seymour	DT	1997-2000	2022

=== College Football Hall of Fame ===
Twenty two former Georgia players and coaches have been inducted in the College Football Hall of Fame. In addition, one former player, Pat Dye, has been inducted into the Hall as a coach for Auburn.

==== Players ====
Player	Position	Career	Induction
Bob McWhorter	HB	1910–1913	1954
Frank Sinkwich	HB	1940–1942	1954
Charley Trippi	HB	1942, 1945–1946	1959
Vernon "Catfish" Smith	E	1929–1931	1979
Bill Hartman	FB	1935–1937	1984
Fran Tarkenton	QB	1958–1960	1987
Bill Stanfill	DT	1966–1968	1998
Herschel Walker	RB	1980–1982	1999
Terry Hoage	S	1980–1983	2000
Kevin Butler	PK	1981–1984	2001
John Rauch	QB	1945–1948	2003
Jake Scott	FS	1966–1968	2011
Scott Woerner	FS	1977-1980	2016
Matt Stinchcomb	OT	1995–1998	2018
David Pollack	DE	2001–2004	2021
Champ Bailey	DB/WR	1996-1998	2022
Garrison Hearst	RB	1990-1992	2026

==== Coaches ====
Coach	Career	Induction
Glenn "Pop" Warner	1895–1896	1951
Vince Dooley	1964–1988	1994
Wally Butts	1939–1960	1997
Jim Donnan	1996–2000	2009
Mark Richt	2001–2015	2023

== Future opponents ==
From 1992 to 2023, Georgia played in the East Division of the SEC and played each opponent in the division each year along with several teams from the West Division. During the 2024 and 2025 seasons, Georgia played a modified conference schedule where they played the same teams both seasons home and away.

On September 22nd, 2025 the SEC announced the 2026-2029 schedules in which Georgia will play three annual opponents and six rotating conference opponents so that Georgia will play at every school in conference home and away in a four-year cycle.

=== 2026–2029 conference schedule ===
2026	2027	2028	2029
Auburn	@ Auburn	Auburn	@ Auburn
vs Florida	vs Florida	vs Florida	vs Florida
@ South Carolina	South Carolina	@ South Carolina	South Carolina
Missouri	LSU	Alabama	Kentucky
Vanderbilt	Mississippi State	Arkansas	Texas A&M
Oklahoma	Tennessee	Ole Miss	Texas
@ Alabama	@ Kentucky	@ Missouri	@ LSU
@ Arkansas	@ Texas A&M	@ Vanderbilt	@ Mississippi State
@ Ole Miss	@ Texas	@ Oklahoma	@ Tennessee

=== Non–conference opponents ===
2026	2027	2028	2029	2030	2031	2032	2033	2034	2035	2036	2037
Tennessee State; Sep 5			Akron; Aug 25		at Ohio State; Aug 30						
Western Kentucky; Sep 12		vs Florida State; TBD		North Carolina A&T; Sep 7	Western Carolina; Sep 6						
Georgia Tech; Nov 28	at Georgia Tech; Nov 27	Georgia Tech; Nov 25	at Georgia Tech; Nov 24	Ohio State; Sep 14							
				Georgia Tech; Nov 30	at Georgia Tech; Nov 29	Georgia Tech; Nov 27	at Georgia Tech; Nov 26	Georgia Tech; Nov 25	at Georgia Tech; Nov 24	Georgia Tech; Nov 29	at Georgia Tech; Nov 28

- 2028 game vs Florida State to be played at Nissan Stadium in Nashville, Tennessee.
- In 2030, either Clemson, North Carolina A&T, or Ohio State will be canceled or rescheduled. The four game series with Clemson has been canceled.

== See also ==
- Georgia Bulldogs
- Larry Munson – "The Voice of the Bulldogs", Georgia football play by play announcer from 1966 to 2008.
