= Quincy Carter =

American football player (born 1977)

No. 17, 1, 3, 7
- Position: Quarterback

Personal information
- Born: October 13, 1977 (age 49); Chicago, Illinois, U.S.
- Listed height: 6 ft 2 in (1.88 m)
- Listed weight: 217 lb (98 kg)

Career information
- High school: Southwest DeKalb (Decatur, Georgia)
- College: Georgia (1998–2000)
- NFL draft: 2001: 2nd round, 53rd overall pick

Career history
- Dallas Cowboys (2001–2003); New York Jets (2004); Montreal Alouettes (2006)*; Bossier–Shreveport Battle Wings (2007); Kansas City Brigade (2008); Abilene Ruff Riders (2009); Corpus Christi Fury (2016)
- * Offseason or practice squad member only

Awards and highlights
- SEC Freshman of the Year (1998); Second-team All-SEC (1999)

Career NFL statistics
- Passing attempts: 960
- Passing completions: 542
- Completion percentage: 56.5%
- TD–INT: 32–37
- Passing yards: 6,337
- Passer rating: 71.7
- Stats at Pro Football Reference
- Stats at ArenaFan.com

LaVonya Quintelle "Quincy" Carter (born October 13, 1977) is an American former professional football player who was a quarterback in the National Football League (NFL). He played college football for the Georgia Bulldogs and was selected in the second round of the 2001 NFL draft. Carter played in the NFL for the Dallas Cowboys and New York Jets. Outside the NFL, he also was a member of the Bossier–Shreveport Battle Wings, Kansas City Brigade and Abilene Ruff Riders. Additionally, from 1996 to 1999, he was in the Chicago Cubs minor league baseball organization.

== Early life ==
Born in Chicago, Illinois but raised in Decatur, Georgia, Carter attended Southwest DeKalb High School in Decatur where he played football and baseball.

As a senior, he led the Panthers to the 1995 AAAA State Championship under head coach William Godfrey. He received Parade All-American and USA Today Georgia Player of the Year honors. He finished his high school career with 4,450 passing yards, 37 passing touchdowns, 1,489 rushing yards and 32 rushing touchdowns.

== Baseball career ==
Carter originally signed a football letter of intent with Georgia Tech in 1996, but opted instead to play minor league baseball after being selected by the Chicago Cubs as an outfielder 52nd overall in the 1996 MLB draft.

In 1996, with the Gulf Coast Cubs of the rookie league, he hit .215 and played in 55 games. In 1997, he was promoted to the Rockford Cubbies of Single-A and hit .211 in 105 games. In 1998, he appeared in 28 games for Rockford, hitting .248 in 27 games. His final year in 1999, he went 0-for-3 in one game for the Daytona Cubs of Advanced A ball and left the team after only three games to return to Athens.

== College career ==
=== Freshman season ===
Struggling with his baseball career, Carter opted to return to play college football in 1998, but made the highly publicized decision to sign with the University of Georgia instead of Georgia Tech, who officially contested the move but was still overruled by the NCAA.

After spending two years away from football, he won the starting quarterback job in a contested battle over future University of Oklahoma starter Nate Hybl, among others. He became the Bulldogs' first freshman starter in 53 years (John Rauch in 1945), finishing with a 9–3 record. a No. 16 ranking in the final AP Poll and winning the 1998 Peach Bowl. He had a record setting season, establishing school freshman marks for passing yards (2,484), touchdowns (12), attempts (290) and completions (176), while tallying 300 passing yards or more in 4 games. His 2,484 passing yards at the time was the fourth highest total in school history. He was named Southeastern Conference Freshman of the Year and was recognized as one of the top young quarterbacks in the nation.

Against Louisiana State University, he was named SEC Offensive Player of the Week after completing 27-of-34 passes (79.4% - career high) for 318 yards and 2 touchdowns. He showed he was a dual-threat quarterback, as he demonstrated in Georgia's 28–26 win over the University of Kentucky, running 14 times for 114 yards (including a 49-yard touchdown run) and completing 10-of-14 passes for 147 yards and 2 passing touchdowns. In the 7–38 loss against the University of Florida, he completed a career-high 33-of-49 passes (67.3%) for a career-high tying 368 yards and 2 interceptions. Against Auburn University, he threw for 351 yards 2 touchdowns and 3 interceptions. In the 1998 Peach Bowl against the University of Virginia, he passed for 222 yards, 2 touchdowns and 3 interceptions to lead Georgia from a 21–0 deficit to a 35–33 victory.

=== Sophomore season ===
Carter had an impressive sophomore season while leading a young team, posting 216 out of 380 completions, 2,713 passing yards (school record for a sophomore), 17 passing touchdowns, 5 rushing touchdowns, and 6 interceptions, directing the offense to 416 yards per-game (second in the SEC). He had five 300 yard passing performances, his interception percentage of 1.58 (six picks in 380 attempts) was a school record and the second lowest percentage in SEC history. He also completed the third longest streak in SEC history after throwing 170 consecutive passes without an interception.

He received SEC Offensive Player of the Week honors after registering 349 passing yards and a touchdown on 26-of-41 completions against the University of Mississippi. Against Georgia Tech in a 48–51 loss, he helped the offense score 48 points, completing 29 out of 55 passes for 345 yards and 2 touchdowns while also rushing for one touchdown. Georgia finished the season with a 7–4 record and ranked 14th in the final AP Poll. In the 2000 Outback Bowl 28–25 overtime win against Purdue University, he threw for 243 yards and one touchdown on 20-of-33 passing, while running for 21 yards and a score to lead the Bulldogs to the biggest come-from-behind victory in school history.

=== Junior season ===
As a junior, he displayed inconsistency, which included a 5-interception game on 10-of-24 passing against the University of South Carolina. He suffered a left shoulder contusion in the sixth game against Vanderbilt University, completing 12 out of 20 passes for 215 yards and one touchdown, forcing him to miss the next contest against the University of Kentucky. He also suffered a torn ulnar collateral ligament in his right thumb during the eighth game of the season against the University of Florida and missed the last 4 games including the 2000 Oahu Bowl. He was replaced with junior Cory Phillips. Carter finished the season completing 91 out of 183 passes, 1,250 passing yards, 6 touchdowns and 10 interceptions.

Carter was 23–8 as the starting quarterback for the Georgia Bulldogs and declared for the NFL draft after his junior season. He finished second in school history behind Eric Zeier in career passing yards (6,447), career pass attempts (853), career completions (483), career offensive plays (1,104), career total offense (7,053 yards) and consecutive pass attempts without an interception (170). He was ranked third in completion percentage (56.60%), third in touchdown passes (35) and fifth in passing efficiency rating (127.79).

== Football career ==
Pre-draft measurables
Height	Weight	Arm length	Hand span	40-yard dash	10-yard split	20-yard split	20-yard shuttle	Three-cone drill	Vertical jump	Broad jump	Wonderlic
6 ft 2 1/8 in (1.88 m)	225 lb (102 kg)	32 1/2 in (0.83 m)	9 in (0.23 m)	4.58 s	1.61 s	2.63 s	4.12 s	7.12 s	35.5 in (0.90 m)	9 ft 5 in (2.87 m)	30
All values from NFL Combine

=== Dallas Cowboys ===
==== 2001 season ====
In the 2001 NFL draft, the Dallas Cowboys did not have a first-round pick because of the trade that sent two first round choices to the Seattle Seahawks in exchange for wide receiver Joey Galloway. Looking for a replacement to the recently retired Troy Aikman, Carter was selected by the Dallas Cowboys in the second round (53rd overall). At the time, it was a selection that was criticized by the media as a reach and it was later reported that owner/general manager Jerry Jones influenced the organization into making it.

Pro Football Weekly suggested in its pre-draft evaluation of Carter that he made a mistake leaving college early due to shortcomings in Carter's play, such as "scatter[ing] the ball all over the place at times" and "poor judgment on the field."

Although he was expected to spend time learning the game behind starter Tony Banks, after having a notable pre-season he was named the team's new starting quarterback midway through training camp (August 14), becoming the first rookie quarterback selected in the second round, to start a week 1 game in NFL history and only the third rookie quarterback to open the season as a starter in club history.

However, he was also part of a succession of short-tenured quarterbacks following the retirement of Aikman. After suffering two separate injuries (sprained right thumb two games and strained left hamstring six games), he ended up starting only eight games, both Anthony Wright and former San Diego Chargers second-overall pick Ryan Leaf started three, while former Arkansas Razorback Clint Stoerner started two.

The highlight of his rookie season was a 27–21 win against the San Francisco 49ers (finished 12–4) in Week 16. Carter showed promise with 241 yards passing and two touchdowns, to become just the second Cowboys rookie to win NFC Offensive Player of the Week honors. He also had an important 20–13 victory over the New York Giants in which he threw for nearly 200 yards, scrambled for a first down late in the game, and threw the game-winning touchdown pass to wide receiver Jackie Harris.

Carter completed 90 out of 176 attempts for 1,072 yards, 5 touchdowns, and 7 interceptions, along with 45 carries for 150 yards. He had a 3–4 record, leading the Cowboys to more victories than any other rookie quarterback in franchise history. His numbers for pass attempts, completions yardage and touchdowns ranked third behind Troy Aikman and Steve Walsh. His final quarterback rating for the season of 63.0, was better than fellow rookie quarterbacks Michael Vick (62.7) and Chris Weinke (62.0), who also started games.

==== 2002 season ====
In 2002, the Cowboys would sign another young quarterback and former baseball player, Chad Hutchinson, to compete with Carter. The highlight of the season was Carter leading the Cowboys to a dramatic come from behind win for the second time in three weeks (the other one was against the St. Louis Rams), on his 25th birthday he turned a 13–0 deficit to the Carolina Panthers, into a 14–13 victory by throwing an 80-yard touchdown pass to Joey Galloway with 3:55 left, then a 24-yarder to Antonio Bryant with 56 seconds to go.

He lost the starting job after a 9–6 loss in the seventh game against the Arizona Cardinals, in which he engaged in a heated sideline argument with Jerry Jones. Hutchinson would start the last nine games of the season.

Carter, in seven starts had a 3–4 record, including a loss to the expansion team Houston Texans. He completed 125 out of 221 attempts for 1,465 yards, 7 touchdowns, 8 interceptions, along with 27 carries for 91 yards. He threw for at least 200 yards in six consecutive games, marking the longest stretch by a Cowboy since Aikman had a streak of six games in 1993. He also completed more than 20 passes in three straight games, which was the longest stretch by a Cowboy since Aikman had a streak of five games in 1996.

==== 2003 season ====
In 2003, with the arrival of new head coach Bill Parcells, all positions were opened to competition, and Carter was involved in a publicized quarterback controversy, when he and Hutchinson competed for a roster spot in the 2002 edition of Hard Knocks, an HBO series that covers the training camp of an NFL team. Carter regained the starting role, bringing stability to the quarterback position and leading the team to a 10–6 record and a playoff appearance.

Against the New York Giants on Monday Night Football, he completed 25 out of 40 passes for a career-high 321 yards, including a touchdown pass and a touchdown run. Dallas trailed by three points with 11 seconds remaining, when he connected a 26-yard pass with wide receiver Antonio Bryant to set up Billy Cundiff's 52-yard field goal that sent the game into overtime. In the extra period, he completed 5-of-8 passes for 61 yards, including a 23-yard toss to tight end Dan Campbell that set up the game winning field goal for a final score of 35–32.

His best game came against the eventual NFC Champion Carolina Panthers, making a career-high for completions (29) on 43 attempts, while passing for 254 yards and 2 touchdowns, including one to Bryant in the last minute of the contest on 4th and 14 for the game winning score. The 24–20 victory assured Dallas its first non-losing season since 1999.

Carter completed 292 out of 505 attempts for 3,302 yards, 17 passing touchdowns, 21 interceptions, 68 carries for 257 yards and 2 rushing touchdowns, while ranking 11th among NFC quarterbacks with a 71.4 rating. He is one of eight quarterbacks in franchise history to pass for more than 3,000 yards in a season, joining Roger Staubach (2 times), Danny White (4 times), Steve Pelluer (1 time), Aikman (5 times), Vinny Testaverde, (1 time), Tony Romo (7 times) and Dak Prescott (6 times).

==== 2004 season ====
During the offseason, coming off a successful year, Carter was abruptly cut on August 4, 2004 under unclear circumstances. The group of quarterbacks for the Cowboys that offseason had expanded with the trade for yet another former baseball player, Drew Henson, and the acquisition of Vinny Testaverde off waivers. Before Carter's release, it had been projected that he had an edge over Testaverde for the starting role and that third-string quarterback Tony Romo would be waived. League sources eventually revealed that Carter had been released after failing a drug test. He'd already flunked two previous tests and would have to be suspended for the first four games of the season.

In 2013, Cowboys coach Bill Parcells shed some light into Carter's situation at Dallas, saying that Carter couldn't handle the pressure of being the Cowboys' starter. "I became pretty close with Quincy personally, and this kid had a lot of good qualities", Parcells said. "He was smart. He understood it. But I just couldn't save his ass. I really couldn't. You just didn't have the time. There he is, he got his team in the playoffs, he's the starting quarterback of the Dallas Cowboys, he's playing good, he's improving, he can get out of trouble, he's pretty smart, he can make almost every throw -- and it's just, some people just can't fight the pressure to succeed. They just can't fight it. It's too much on them once the bar gets up a little bit. It's too much. I don't know all the problems or the demons exactly, but that's what eventually took him down".

In his Cowboys career, he started 31 games, registering 507 completions in 902 attempts for 5,839 yards, 29 touchdown passes, 498 rushing yards, 3 touchdown runs, 36 interceptions and a 72.3 passer rating.

=== New York Jets ===
On August 24, 2004, Carter was signed to a one-year contract by the New York Jets to serve as a veteran backup to Chad Pennington. He ended up starting three games (winning two) after Pennington injured his rotator cuff, and if not for his performance, the team would not have made the playoffs. He finished the season with some of the best statistics of his career: 35 completions in 58 passes for 498 yards, 3 touchdowns, one interception and a 98.2 passer rating.

The Jets declared him inactive for the divisional playoff game against the Pittsburgh Steelers on January 15, announcing that he had left the team to attend to his sick mother, when in reality he had enrolled into a rehabilitation program. He was not re-signed after the season. He finished his NFL career with 542 out of 960 completions for 6,337 yards, 32 touchdown passes, 518 rushing yards, 3 touchdown runs and 37 interceptions, for a passer efficiency rating of 71.7.

=== Montreal Alouettes ===
On April 4, 2006, Carter was signed by the Montreal Alouettes of the Canadian Football League to a one-year contract with an option for 2007, to be the backup to Anthony Calvillo. He was cut by the team on May 25. On the subject of being released, Carter remarked, "This is a joke... an insult." One CFL club official told the Montreal Gazette that Carter has "a serious marijuana problem."

=== Bossier–Shreveport Battle Wings ===
In February 2007, Carter signed with the Bossier–Shreveport Battle Wings of the af2. Through the first three games of the season he was the third ranked passer, with a rating of 124.3, throwing for 18 touchdown passes, but he was suspended indefinitely from the team in late May for missing team meetings. Battle Wings coach Jon Norris named Carter the starting quarterback for their June 16 game against the Corpus Christi Sharks and passed for a franchise-record eight touchdowns in the Battle Wings' 81–35 win.

Carter was arrested on possession charges by the Shreveport police on October 12. Because the incident marked the second time he was arrested for the same crime, the charge was a felony. He was released on his 30th birthday, on a bond of $5,224, according to an official in the records department at the Caddo Correctional Facility.

=== Kansas City Brigade ===
On May 1, 2008, Carter signed with the Arena Football League's Kansas City Brigade. The team had one victory at the time of the signing and were hoping Carter's strong arm could resurrect their season. Herman Edwards, who coached Carter while with the Jets, commented on Carter's personality calling him of "good character". On May 27, he was signed from the practice squad. Carter wore #3 and started the last three games of the season, registering 51 out of 89 completions for 575 yards, 8 touchdowns and 4 interceptions. He was signed to a two-year contract extension on June 23.

On July 31, Carter had a workout with the Miami Dolphins but was not signed. On October 20, he was released by the Brigade.

=== Abilene Ruff Riders ===
In March 2009, Carter signed a one-year contract with the Abilene Ruff Riders of the Indoor Football League. On May 10, he was arrested by Abilene, Texas police for an outstanding warrant, related to a DWI arrest in south Texas and subsequent probation violation. Carter was arrested again on June 18, for failing to pay his bondsman after his May 10 arrest. Returning from injury, Carter no-showed for the July 4 game and was cut from the team the next day.

=== Corpus Christi Fury ===
On February 19, 2015, he was signed by the Corpus Christi Fury of the American Indoor Football league. In 2016, the team cancelled several games during the season and only played one game against an American Indoor Football member. While never announced by the team itself, the Fury appeared to have folded before their May 15 game against the New Mexico Stars, giving them 24-hours notice that they would be unable to make the game.

== Career statistics ==
College statistics
Year	Team	Passing							Rushing			
Year	Team	Cmp	Att	Pct	Yds	TD	Int	Rtg	Att	Yds	Avg	TD
1998	Georgia	176	290	60.7	2,484	12	9	140.1	99	284	2.9	4
1999	Georgia	216	380	56.8	2,713	17	6	128.4	105	255	2.4	5
2000	Georgia	91	183	49.7	1,250	6	10	107.0	50	67	1.3	2
Totals		483	853	56.6	6,447	35	25	127.8	254	606	2.4	11

== Personal life ==
On December 15, 2006, Carter was arrested in Irving, Texas on possession of marijuana charges. He was released in lieu of a $500 bond paid by Dallas sports talk-show host and journalist, Randy Galloway.

Carter became an independent youth football coach in Georgia specializing in training for the quarterback position. His personal problems continued until July 2013, when he was arrested again and charged with family violence simple battery after authorities said he allegedly threw a child safety seat at his girlfriend. The charge was a misdemeanor.

Carter's standout collegiate career at the University of Georgia has caught the attention of several rap artists in Atlanta over the years, such as Gucci Mane, who referenced Carter in his single "Trap House".

Carter has a son named Quincy Carter Jr. who attends Southwest DeKalb High School.

In 2020, Carter celebrated one year of sobriety. He is currently training youth at his quarterback school.

On December 8, 2025, Carter was hired as the head football coach at Heritage High School in Conyers, Georgia. He had served during the previous season as a community coach under interim head coach Caleb Shaw, playing a significant role in directing the team's development.

== See also ==
- List of Arena Football League and National Football League players
