= Oʻahu Bowl =

Oʻahu Bowl (defunct)
- Jeep Oʻahu Bowl
- Stadium: Aloha Stadium
- Location: Honolulu, Hawaii
- Operated: 1998–2000

Sponsors
- Jeep

The Oʻahu Bowl (often written as Oahu Bowl) was a National Collegiate Athletic Association Football Bowl Subdivision (then known as Division I-A) bowl game played in Honolulu, Hawaii at Aloha Stadium. Played on Christmas Day or Christmas Eve, the Oʻahu Bowl was sponsored by the Jeep Division of Chrysler Corporation. The inaugural game was played in 1998 and the last game was played in 2000, after it lost its sponsorship as a result of a corporate merger between Jeep parent Chrysler Corporation and Daimler Benz. The Oʻahu Bowl was part of a double-header played after the Aloha Bowl on Christmas its first two years; the 2000 game was played on Christmas Eve.

In 2001, the Oʻahu Bowl became the Seattle Bowl and played two games before losing NCAA certification. The Aloha Bowl, scheduled to move to San Francisco at the same time, lost certification before it could play a game.

== Game results ==
Rankings are based on the AP Poll prior to the game being played.

Date played	Winning team		Losing team		Attendance	Notes	Reference
December 25, 1998	#16 Air Force	45	Washington	25	46,451	notes	
December 25, 1999	Hawaii	23	Oregon State	17	40,974	notes	
December 24, 2000	#24 Georgia	37	Virginia	14	24,187	notes	

== Appearances by team ==
Rank	Team	Appearances	Record	Win %
T1	[[Air Force Falcons football|Air Force]]	1	1–0	1.000
T1	[[Georgia Bulldogs football|Georgia]]	1	1–0	1.000
T1	[[Hawaii Rainbow Warriors football|Hawaii]]	1	1–0	1.000
T1	[[Oregon State Beavers football|Oregon State]]	1	0–1	.000
T1	[[Virginia Cavaliers football|Virginia]]	1	0–1	.000
T1	[[Washington Huskies football|Washington]]	1	0–1	.000

== Appearances by conference ==
Rank	Conference	Appearances	Record	Win %	# of Teams	Teams
T1	WAC	2	2–0	1.000	2	Air Force (1–0) Hawaii (1–0)
T1	Pac-10	2	0–2	.000	2	Oregon State (0–1) Washington (0–1)
T3	SEC	1	1–0	1.000	1	Georgia (1–0)
T3	ACC	1	0–1	.000	1	Virginia (0–1)

== In popular culture ==
- In the "Twas the Nut Before Christmas" episode of King of the Hill (first aired December 17, 2000), Hank Hill exclaims "Tomorrow, Christmas service falls right between the Aloha Bowl and the Oahu Bowl. "

== See also ==
- Poi Bowl (1936–1939)
- Pineapple Bowl (1940–1952)
- Aloha Bowl (1982–2000)
- Hawaii Bowl (since 2002)
- Hula Bowl (1947–2008)
- List of college bowl games
