= Ernest Brown (coach) =

American football player and coach

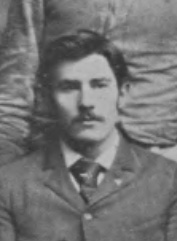
- Brown pictured in The Pandora 1894, Georgia yearbook
- Height: 5 ft 10 in (178 cm)
- Weight: 165 lb (75 kg)

Playing career
- 1888–1889: Cornell
- 1891: Shortlidge Media Academy
- 1892: Pittsburgh Athletic Club
- 1893: Georgia
- 1894: Pittsburgh Athletic Club
- 1895: Duquesne Country and Athletic Club
- 1896: Pittsburgh College
- Position: Halfback

Coaching career (HC unless noted)
- 1893: Georgia
- 1896: Pittsburgh College

Head coaching record
- Overall: 14–3–1

Ernest H. "Rags" Brown was an American college football player and coach. He served as the head football coach at University of Georgia in 1893 and Pittsburgh Catholic College of the Holy Ghost—now known as Duquesne University—in 1896.

== Football career ==
Brown attended Cornell University, and for two years played regularly on the Cornell football team. He is listed in The Cornellian '91 yearbook as an electrical engineering student from Belfast, New York.

In the fall of 1891, Brown accepted an unspecified position at Shortlidge Academy of Media, Pennsylvania and played on the school's football team. He acquired his nickname "Rags" in a game that season against the Pittsburgh Athletic Club, as recounted years later by The Pittsburg[h] Post:

He was the whole Media team, and went through P.A.C.'s line, though one of his ears was half torn off, and he was compelled to bandage his entire head. These bandages often becoming loose and flying about his head caused the spectators to nickname him "Rags," which has stuck to him ever since.

After starting the 1892 season as a halfback with a team in Johnstown, Pennsylvania, Brown came to Pittsburgh to play the same position for the Pittsburgh Athletic Club. He participated in the Pittsburgh A.C.'s game against the Allegheny Athletic Association on November 12; this game, for which Pudge Heffelfinger received $500 to play for Allegheny, is regarded by the Pro Football Hall of Fame as representing the "birth of pro football".

In 1893, as a graduate student in chemistry and assaying at the University of Georgia, Brown served as the head coach of the Georgia Bulldogs football team, compiling a record of 2–2–1. He also played halfback in at least two games, against Georgia Tech and Vanderbilt, getting badly injured in the latter game. Brown was the last unpaid head football coach at Georgia. He left the University of Georgia in January 1894.

Brown was back with the Pittsburgh Athletic Club in the fall of 1894. In the following year, he played for the newly formed Duquesne Country and Athletic Club.

Brown served as football head coach for the Pittsburgh College of the Holy Ghost (later renamed Duquesne University) for one season in 1896. He also played for the team as a player-coach. At the time, players on the team were not limited to students of the college. Duquesne University credits its 1896 team with a 12–1 record.

Grove City College lists its head football coach in 1897 as "Rags" Brown, ascribing to him a record of 5–1–1. The Pittsburgh Commercial Gazette, however, stated that year that Grove City's coach was former Princeton player Harry Brown; the New Castle News similarly noted that Grove City's Brown, the team's coach and fullback, formerly played end at Princeton.

== Head coaching record ==
Year	Team	Overall	Conference	Standing	Bowl/playoffs
Georgia Bulldogs (Independent) (1893)
1893	Georgia	2–2–1			
Georgia:		2–2–1			
Pittsburgh College (Independent) (1896)
1896	Pittsburgh College	12–1			
Pittsburgh College:		12–1			
Total:		14–3–1			
