= 2004 Capital One Bowl =

American college football game

Georgia Bulldogs	Purdue Boilermakers
(10–3)	(9–3)
SEC	Big Ten
34	27
Head coach: Mark Richt	Head coach: Joe Tiller
AP / Coaches / BCS; 11 / 11 / 12	AP / Coaches / BCS; 12 / 13 / 14
	1	2	3	4	OT	Total
Georgia	14	10	0	3	7	34
Purdue	0	10	0	17	0	27
- Date: January 1, 2004
- Season: 2003
- Stadium: Florida Citrus Bowl
- Location: Orlando, Florida
- MVP: David Greene (Georgia QB)
- Favorite: Georgia by 7
- Referee: David Cutaia (Pac-10)
- Attendance: 64,565

United States TV coverage
- Network: ABC
- Announcers: Gary Thorne, David Norrie, Jerry Punch

The 2004 Capital One Bowl was a post-season college football bowl game between the Georgia Bulldogs and the Purdue Boilermakers on January 1, 2004, at the Florida Citrus Bowl in Orlando, Florida. Purdue entered as the Big Ten runner-up, while Georgia entered the game after a disappointing loss in the SEC Championship Game. Georgia won the game 34-27 in overtime.

== Game Recap ==
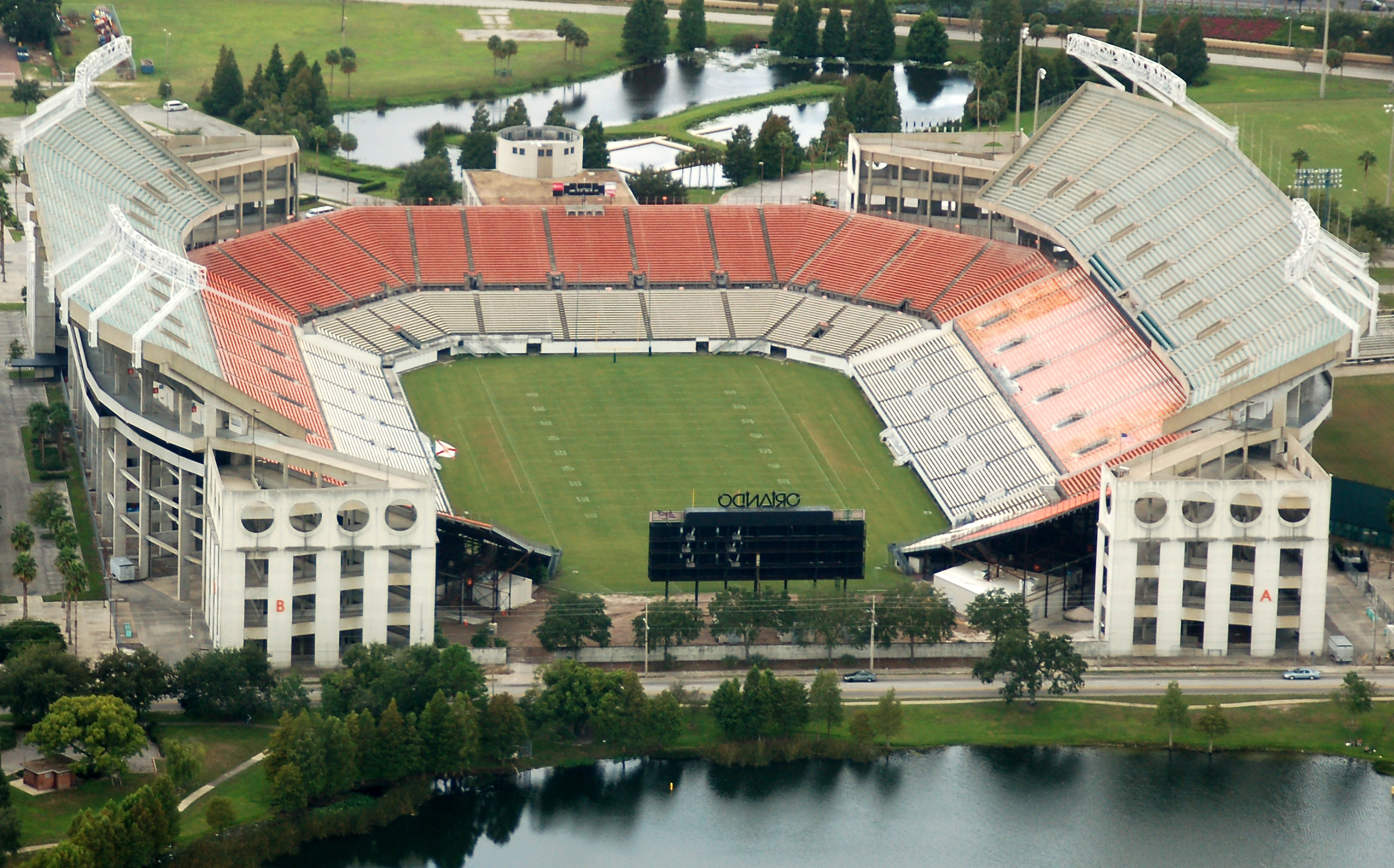
The game was played in the Citrus Bowl, in Orlando, Florida.

64,565 people came out to watch a rematch of the 2000 Outback Bowl, the only previous time Georgia and Purdue had played each other. Georgia won that game in overtime, 28-25, scoring 28 unanswered points to come back from a 25-0 deficit.

The 2004 rematch followed a similar pattern, with a big comeback (this time from Purdue) and the game ending with a Georgia win in overtime. Georgia started quickly, scoring 24 unanswered points to begin the game. The score was 24–0 with 5 minutes left in the first half. Purdue scored 10 quick points before halftime to make it 24–10. After a scoreless third quarter, the stage was set for an exciting ending.

After Purdue opened the quarter with a touchdown to make it 24–17, Georgia added a field goal with 7 minutes remaining to make it 27–17. Purdue would manage a touchdown drive, scoring with 1:34 left, but when the Boilermakers couldn't recover the ensuing onside kick it appeared the game was over. Purdue was out of timeouts when Mark Richt called a run on second down instead of ordering quarterback David Greene to take a knee. The coach was trying to avoid a punt with a few seconds left, but he quickly regretted his decision. Running back Kregg Lumpkin got hemmed up deep in the backfield and tried to run the other way, but Shaun Phillips stripped the ball. After a wild scramble, Niko Koutouvides recovered for Purdue at the Georgia 34. Purdue's Ben Jones then kicked a 44-yard field goal with 49 seconds remaining to keep the game going, tied at 27.

Taking the ball first, the Bulldogs got to the 3 with the help of a pass interference penalty on Bobby Iwuchukwu, then went for it on fourth down from inside the 1. Lumpkin managed to slide through a crease for the touchdown. Purdue then received the ball with a chance to keep the game going. Georgia appeared to get the clinching stop when Kyle Orton threw an incomplete pass on fourth-and-goal from the 8, but the Bulldogs were offsides. Orton's final pass was intercepted by Taylor in the end zone, setting off a wild celebration by the Georgia players.

== Statistics ==
Statistics	Purdue	Georgia
1st Downs	15	23
Passing Yards	230	327
Rushing Yards	59	113
3rd Down Conversions	5–13	7–17
Turnovers	1	2
Time of possession	24:31	35:29
