= 1946 Oil Bowl =

Georgia Bulldogs	Tulsa Golden Hurricane
(8–2)	(8–2)
20	6
Head coach: Wally Butts	Head coach: Henry Frnka
AP 18	AP 17
	1	2	3	4	Total
Georgia	7	0	0	13	20
Tulsa	0	6	0	0	6
- Date: January 1, 1946
- Season: 1945
- Stadium: Rice Field
- Location: Houston, Texas
- Referee: L.L. McMasters (SEC; split crew: SEC, MVC)
- Attendance: 27,000

The 1946 Oil Bowl was a college football postseason bowl game featuring the Georgia Bulldogs and the Tulsa Golden Hurricane in the first Oil Bowl since 1944.

== Background ==
The Bulldogs had finished 4th in the Southeastern Conference, compounded by losses to LSU and 6th ranked Alabama. This was their third ever bowl game. The Golden Hurricane had finished 2nd in the Missouri Valley Conference, but they were playing in their fifth bowl game of the decade.

== Game summary ==
Charles Smith gave the Bulldogs a 7-0 lead on his 3 yard touchdown run. Tulsa responded with a Camp Wilson touchdown run, but their extra point failed, keeping it 7-6. John Donaldson caught a 64 yard pass from Charley Trippi to increase the lead. Trippi made the final score 20-6 on his 68 yard punt return, highlighted by him reversing his field and running over two Tulsa players near a sideline.

== Aftermath ==
Frkna would leave for Tulane after the game, and Tulsa did not appear in a bowl game again until 1953. Georgia went to three more bowl games before the decade ended.

== Statistics ==
Statistics	Tulsa	Georgia
First downs	7	14
Rushing yards	69	178
Passing yards	79	110
Fumbles–lost	1–1	4–3
Punts–average	12–35.0	7–36.0
Penalties–Penalty yards	4–40	4–29
