= Jim Donnan =

American football player and coach (born 1945)

Biographical details
- Born: January 29, 1945 (age 81); Laurens, South Carolina, U.S.
- Education: Burlington (NC) Williams

Playing career
- 1965–1967: NC State
- Positions: Quarterback, kicker

Coaching career (HC unless noted)
- 1969–1970: NC State (freshman)
- 1971: NC State (QB/WR)
- 1971 (bowl game): North Carolina (assistant)
- 1972–1973: Florida State (RB/freshman)
- 1974–1975: North Carolina (freshman)
- 1976–1977: North Carolina (backfield)
- 1978: Kansas State (QB)
- 1979–1980: Kansas State (backfield)
- 1981–1984: Missouri (QB/WR)
- 1985–1989: Oklahoma (OC/QB)
- 1990–1995: Marshall
- 1996–2000: Georgia

Head coaching record
- Overall: 104–40
- Bowls: 4–0
- Tournaments: 15–4 (NCAA D-I-AA playoffs)

Accomplishments and honors

Championships
- 1 NCAA Division I-AA (1992); 1 SoCon (1994)

Awards
- SEC Coach of the Year (1997)
- College Football Hall of Fame; Inducted in 2009 (profile)

James Mason Donnan III (born January 29, 1945) is an American former college football coach and former player who is now a television analyst and a motivational speaker. He served as the head football coach at Marshall University (1990–1995) and the University of Georgia (1996–2000), compiling a career record of 104–40. His 1992 Marshall team won an NCAA Division I-AA national title. Donnan was inducted into the College Football Hall of Fame as a coach in 2009.

== Early life and college playing career ==
Born in Laurens, South Carolina, Donnan grew up in Burlington, North Carolina and graduated from Walter M. Williams High School in 1963. During his playing days as a quarterback at North Carolina State University, Donnan defeated his future team, Georgia, 14–7, in the 1967 Liberty Bowl. He was the ACC Player of the Year in 1967. He also played tennis for NC State. Donnan graduated from NC State in January 1968 with a Bachelor of Science degree in recreation and park administration.

== Coaching career ==
Prior to working as a head coach, Donnan served as an assistant coach at several schools, including Kansas State University, University of Missouri, Florida State University, and the University of Oklahoma. Donnan was the offensive coordinator at Oklahoma from 1985 to 1989. From 1985 to 1988, he coached under Barry Switzer, a member of the College Football Hall of Fame and a Super Bowl winning coach. Donnan coached the legendary Oklahoma Sooner wishbone offense that helped the Sooners to three consecutive 11–1 seasons from 1985 to 1987, and a national championship in 1985. In 1986, the Sooners scored 508 points, which at the time was the second highest point total in the school's storied history, trailing only the Sooners 1971 NCAA record-setting rushing offense that scored 534 points.

Donnan was head football coach at Marshall University, where he led the Thundering Herd to a 64–21 record from 1990 to 1995, including five consecutive 11-plus win seasons, four championship games, and the 1992 NCAA Division I-AA national football championship. He was named the Division I-AA Coach of the Year twice.

Donnan was then the head football coach at the University of Georgia from 1996 to 2000. He compiled a 40–19 record during his tenure. He was the first football coach in school history to lead Bulldog teams to four consecutive bowl victories. Under Donnan, the Bulldogs won the 1998 Outback Bowl, the 1998 Peach Bowl, the 2000 Outback Bowl, and the 2000 Oahu Bowl. Before the 1997 game against Mississippi State, Donnan drove a steamroller into practice and told his players they "were either going to be the steamroller or the pavement"; Georgia won the game, 47–0.

Donnan was fired by University President Michael F. Adams, against the wishes of athletic director Vince Dooley, in 2000 after the Bulldogs struggled to two consecutive eight-win seasons, and three consecutive losses against Georgia Tech. Donnan's inability to return the program to the national prominence of Dooley's era and to compete with longtime SEC Eastern Division rivals such as Tennessee and Florida, combined with certain off-the-field problems for players, are believed to be the reasons for his dismissal.

In May 2009, Donnan was elected to the College Football Hall of Fame for his coaching successes.

== Post-coaching career ==
In December 2002, Donnan was a leading candidate for, interviewed for and was offered the University of Kentucky Wildcats head coaching job, but he ultimately turned it down. The job eventually went to Rich Brooks. After coaching, Donnan worked as a college football analyst for ESPN. In August 2014, Donnan was hired as an analyst for the American Sports Network.

== Head coaching record ==
Year	Team	Overall	Conference	Standing	Bowl/playoffs	Coaches^{#}	AP^{°}
Marshall Thundering Herd (Southern Conference) (1990–1995)
1990	Marshall	6–5	4–3	T–4th			
1991	Marshall	11–4	5–2	T–2nd	L NCAA Division I-AA Championship		
1992	Marshall	12–3	5–2	T–2nd	W NCAA Division I-AA Championship		
1993	Marshall	11–4	6–2	2nd	L NCAA Division I-AA Championship		
1994	Marshall	12–2	7–1	1st	L NCAA Division I-AA Semifinal		
1995	Marshall	12–3	7–1	2nd	L NCAA Division I-AA Championship		
Marshall:		64–21	34–11				
Georgia Bulldogs (Southeastern Conference) (1996–2000)
1996	Georgia	5–6	3–5	T–4th (Eastern)			
1997	Georgia	10–2	6–2	T–2nd (Eastern)	W Outback	10	10
1998	Georgia	9–3	6–2	3rd (Eastern)	W Peach	14	14
1999	Georgia	8–4	5–3	3rd (Eastern)	W Outback	16	16
2000	Georgia	8–4	5–3	T–2nd (Eastern)	W Oahu	17	20
Georgia:		40–19	25–15				
Total:		104–40					
National championship Conference title Conference division title or championship game berth
^{#}Rankings from final Coaches Poll.; ^{°}Rankings from final AP Poll.
