= 1998 Peach Bowl (December) =

American college football game

1998 Chick-fil-A Peach Bowl
- 31st Peach Bowl
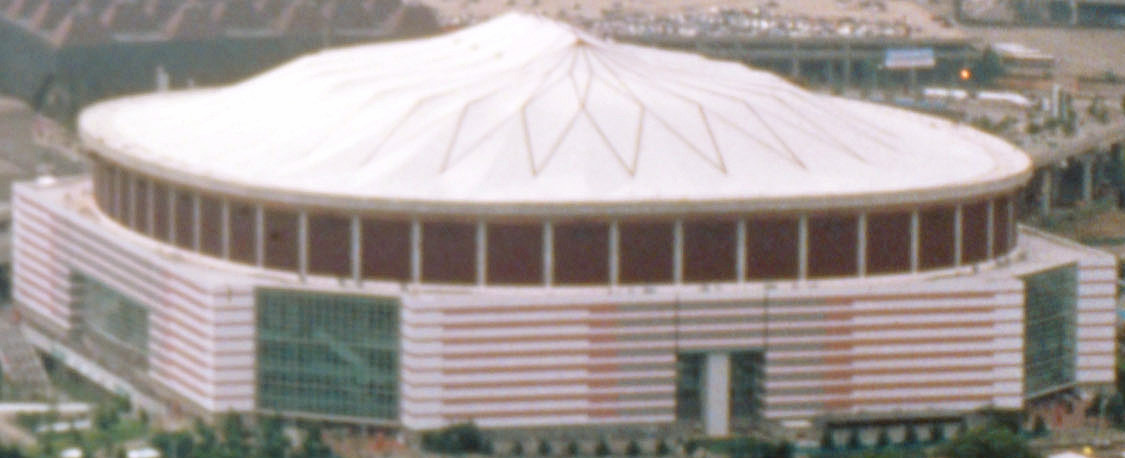
- The Georgia Dome in Atlanta, Georgia, hosted the Peach Bowl.
Georgia Bulldogs	Virginia Cavaliers
(8–3)	(9–2)
SEC	ACC
35	33
Head coach: Jim Donnan	Head coach: George Welsh
AP / Coaches / BCS; 19 / 19 / NR	AP / Coaches / BCS; 13 / 12 / 12
	1	2	3	4	Total
Georgia	0	7	14	14	35
Virginia	0	21	6	6	33
- Date: December 31, 1998
- Season: 1998
- Stadium: Georgia Dome
- Location: Atlanta, Georgia
- Referee: James Sprenger (Pac-10)

United States TV coverage
- Network: ESPN
- Announcers: Charley Steiner, Todd Christensen, and Dean Blevins

The 1998 Peach Bowl featured the Georgia Bulldogs and Virginia Cavaliers.

After a scoreless first quarter, Virginia scored first on a 2-yard Anthony Southern touchdown run, making the score 7–0. Aaron Brooks threw a 43-yard touchdown pass to Terrence Wilkins making the score 14–0. Brooks threw a 24-yard touchdown pass to Thomas Jones as Virginia took a 21–0 lead. An 11-yard touchdown pass by Quincy Carter made the halftime score 21–7.

In the third quarter, Carter threw a 14-yard touchdown pass to Champ Bailey, as Georgia cut the deficit to 21–14. Olandis Gary's 15-yard touchdown run tied the game at 21. Brooks threw a 67-yard touchdown pass to Terrence Wilkins, but Todd Braverman missed the extra point, giving Virginia a 27–21 lead at the end of three quarters. In the fourth quarter, Olandis Gary scored on a 2-yard run, giving Georgia a 28–27 lead. Quincy Carter later scored on a 1-yard touchdown run, giving the Bulldogs a 35–27 lead. In the fourth quarter, Brooks scored on a 30-yard scoring run, bringing the score to 35–33, but failed on the two-point conversion. After Virginia recovered the ensuing onside kick, Braverman's last second field goal attempt barely sailed wide right, giving Georgia the victory.
