= 1947 Sugar Bowl =

American college football game

- 13th Sugar Bowl
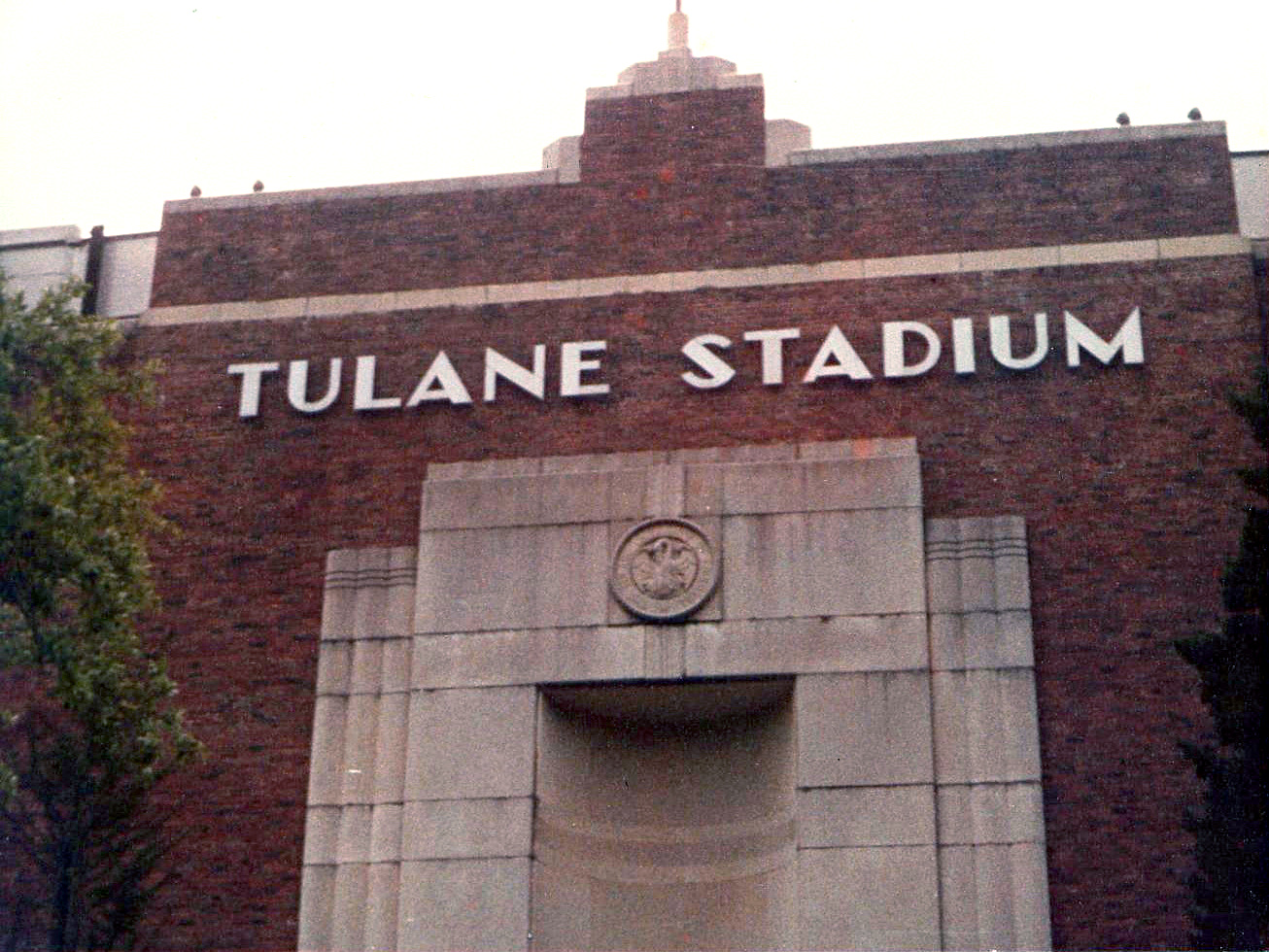
- Tulane Stadium in New Orleans, Louisiana, hosted the Sugar Bowl.
Georgia Bulldogs	North Carolina Tar Heels
(10–0)	(8–1–1)
SEC	SoCon
20	10
Head coach: Wally Butts	Head coach: Carl Snavely
AP 3	AP 8
	1	2	3	4	Total
Georgia	0	0	13	7	20
North Carolina	0	7	3	0	10
- Date: January 1, 1947
- Season: 1946
- Stadium: Tulane Stadium
- Location: New Orleans, Louisiana
- Referee: Alvin Bell (SEC; split crew: SEC, Southern)
- Attendance: 73,300

The 1947 Sugar Bowl was played between the third-ranked Georgia Bulldogs and the ninth-ranked North Carolina Tar Heels. Georgia won 20–10.

In the second quarter, North Carolina scored on a four-yard Walt Pupa touchdown run to take a 7–0 halftime lead. In the third quarter, Georgia scored on a 4-yard touchdown run by John Rauch to tie the game at 7. North Carolina's Fox kicked a 27-yard field goal as North Carolina led 10–7. Georgia scored on a 67-yard touchdown pass from Charley Trippi to Dan Edwards to take a 13–10 lead. In the fourth quarter, Rauch scored on a 13-yard touchdown to seal the Georgia victory 20–10.
