= 1998 Outback Bowl =

- 12th Outback Bowl
Wisconsin Badgers	Georgia Bulldogs
(8–4)	(9–2)
Big Ten	SEC
6	33
Head coach: Barry Alvarez	Head coach: Jim Donnan
	AP / Coaches / BA; 12 / 11 / 12
	1	2	3	4	Total
Wisconsin	0	0	0	6	6
Georgia	12	7	7	7	33
- Date: January 1, 1998
- Season: 1997
- Stadium: Tampa Stadium
- Location: Tampa, Florida
- MVP: Mike Bobo (Georgia QB)
- Referee: Pat Flood (Pac-10)

United States TV coverage
- Network: ESPN
- Announcers: Ron Franklin, Mike Gottfried

The 1998 Outback Bowl featured the Georgia Bulldogs and the Wisconsin Badgers. It was the 12th edition of the Outback Bowl

Georgia scored first on a 2-yard touchdown run from running back Robert Edwards, giving Georgia an early 6–0 lead. Edwards later scored on a 40-yard touchdown run, but the ensuing two-point conversion attempt failed, making the score 12–0.

In the second quarter, Olandis Gary scored on a 3-yard touchdown run, increasing Georgia's lead to 19–0. In the third quarter, Robert Edwards ran for his third touchdown of the game, on a 13-yard run.

In the fourth quarter, quarterback Mike Bobo fired a 7-yard touchdown strike to tight end Jere Brower, making the score 33–0. Bobo was later named MVP of the game, after connecting on 26 of 28 passes for 267 yards. Wisconsin scored its only points of the game on a 12-yard touchdown pass from quarterback Scott Kavanagh to tight end Dague Retzlaff.
