= 2001 Music City Bowl =

- 4th Music City Bowl
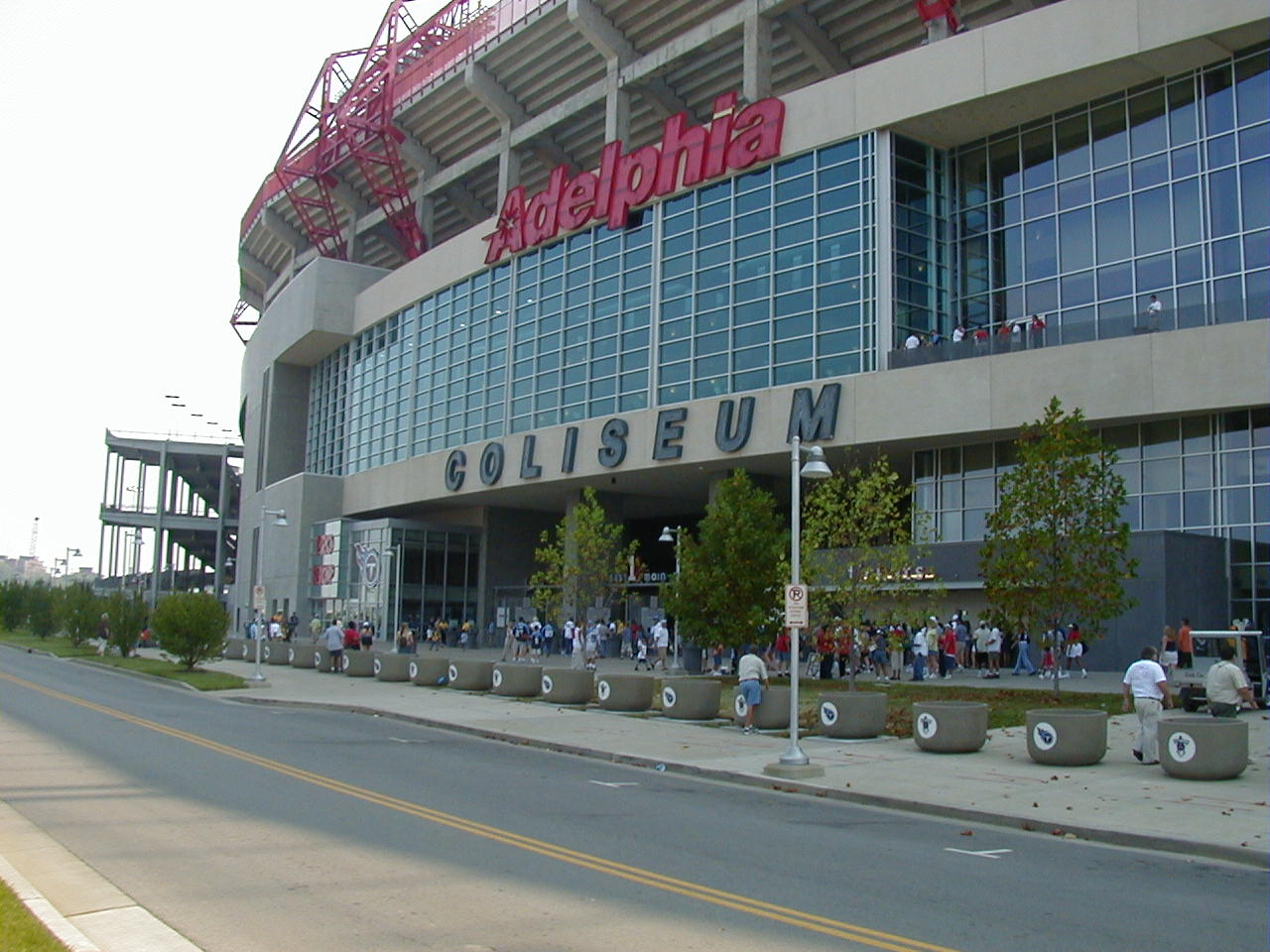
- Adelphia Coliseum in Nashville, Tennessee, hosted the Music City Bowl.
Boston College Eagles	Georgia Bulldogs
(7–4)	(8–3)
Big East	SEC
20	16
Head coach: Tom O'Brien	Head coach: Mark Richt
	AP / Coaches / BCS; 16 / 19 / NR
	1	2	3	4	Total
Boston College	3	10	0	7	20
Georgia	7	3	6	0	16
- Date: December 28, 2001
- Season: 2001
- Stadium: Adelphia Coliseum
- Location: Nashville, Tennessee
- MVP: RB William Green, Boston College
- Referee: Nick Define (MAC)
- Attendance: 46,125
- Payout: US$750,000 per team

United States TV coverage
- Network: ESPN
- Announcers: Mark Jones, Chris Spielman, Holly Rowe

The 2001 Music City Bowl was the fourth edition of the bowl game held. It was played on December 28, 2001, at Adelphia Coliseum in Nashville, Tennessee, and featured the Boston College Eagles and the Georgia Bulldogs.

== Game Recap ==
Georgia scored first on a 15-yard touchdown pass from quarterback David Greene to wide receiver Fred Gibson, giving the Bulldogs an early 7–0 lead. Boston College kicker Sandro Sciortino kicked a 25-yard field goal near the end of the quarter, to cut the lead to 7–3. In the second quarter, quarterback Brian St. Pierre threw a 10-yard touchdown pass to wide receiver Dedrick Dewalt, as Boston College took a 10–7 lead.

Sandro Sciortino added another 26 yard field goal to take a 13–7 lead. Georgia kicker Billy Bennett kicked a 24-yard field goal before halftime, and BC led 13–10 at halftime. In the third quarter, Georgia's Verron Haynes scored on a 1-yard touchdown run. The ensuing extra point attempt failed, and Georgia clung to a 16–13 lead. With less than 5 minutes left in the game, William Green rushed for a 7-yard touchdown, giving Boston College a 20–16 lead. BC's defense held on for the win. Green was named the game's Most Valuable Player.
