= 2000 Outback Bowl =

- 14th Outback Bowl
Georgia Bulldogs	Purdue Boilermakers
(7–4)	(7–4)
SEC	Big Ten
28	25
Head coach: Jim Donnan	Head coach: Joe Tiller
AP / Coaches / BCS; 21 / 24 / NR	AP / Coaches / BCS; 19 / 20 / NR
	1	2	3	4	OT	Total
Georgia	0	10	8	7	3	28
Purdue	19	6	0	0	0	25
- Date: January 1, 2000
- Season: 1999
- Stadium: Raymond James Stadium
- Location: Tampa, Florida
- MVP: Drew Brees (Purdue QB)
- Referee: Randy Christal (Big 12)

United States TV coverage
- Network: ESPN
- Announcers: Ron Franklin, Mike Gottfried, Adrian Karsten

The 2000 Outback Bowl featured the Georgia Bulldogs and the Purdue Boilermakers. It was the 14th edition of the Outback Bowl.

== Summary ==
Purdue quarterback Drew Brees threw touchdown passes of 3 and 11 yards to wide receiver Chris Daniels as Purdue opened up a 13–0 lead. Brees fired a 21-yard touchdown pass to Vinny Sutherland as Purdue led 19–0 at the end of the first quarter. In the second quarter, Brees fired a 32-yard touchdown pass to Chris James, and Purdue led 25–0. Georgia's Terrence Edwards scored on a 74-yard touchdown run cutting the margin to 25–7. A Georgia field goal before halftime made the score 25–10.

In the third quarter, Georgia quarterback Quincy Carter scored on an 8-yard touchdown run, and the two-point conversion attempt was good, making the score Purdue 25–18 after three quarters. In the fourth quarter, Carter found Randy McMichael for an 8-yard touchdown pass to tie the game, 25–25. In overtime, Hap Hines kicked a 21-yard field goal as Georgia escaped with a 28–25 victory.
