= 2000 Oahu Bowl =

2000 Jeep Oahu Bowl
- Oahu Bowl logo
Georgia Bulldogs	Virginia Cavaliers
(7–4)	(6–5)
37	14
Head coach: Jim Donnan	Head coach: George Welsh
AP / Coaches / BCS; 24 / 24 / NR	AP / Coaches / BCS; NR / NR / NR
	1	2	3	4	Total
Georgia	17	7	0	13	37
Virginia	0	7	7	0	14
- Date: December 24, 2000
- Season: 2000
- Stadium: Aloha Stadium
- Location: Honolulu, Hawaii
- Referee: Jay Stricherz (Pac-10)
- Attendance: 24,187
- Payout: US$750,000 per team

United States TV coverage
- Network: ESPN
- Announcers: Steve Levy, Todd Christensen, Dave Ryan

The 2000 Jeep Oahu Bowl was a college football bowl game, played as part of the 2000–01 bowl game schedule of the 2000 NCAA Division I-A football season. It was the 3rd and final game named Oahu Bowl, and became the Seattle Bowl for the 2001 contest. (It was later shut down after 2 years as the Seattle Bowl.)

The game was played on December 24, 2000, at Aloha Stadium in Honolulu, Hawaiʻi. The game matched the Georgia Bulldogs against the Virginia Cavaliers, and was televised on ESPN. The 24th ranked Georgia Bulldogs won the game, 37–14.

The game marked the final game as head coach for Jim Donnan of Georgia and George Welsh of Virginia, both of whom retired from head coaching after the season.
