= Georgia Redcoat Marching Band =

Marching band of the University of Georgia

The University of Georgia Redcoat Band
- Nickname: The Redcoats
- School: University of Georgia
- Location: Athens, Georgia
- Conference: SEC
- Founded: 1905
- Director: Brett Bawcum
- Associate Director: Marcus Morris
- Assistant Director: Mia Athanas
- Members: 400+
- Practice field: Redcoat Band Rehearsal Field
- Fight song: "Hail to Georgia"
- Website: bands.uga.edu/redcoats

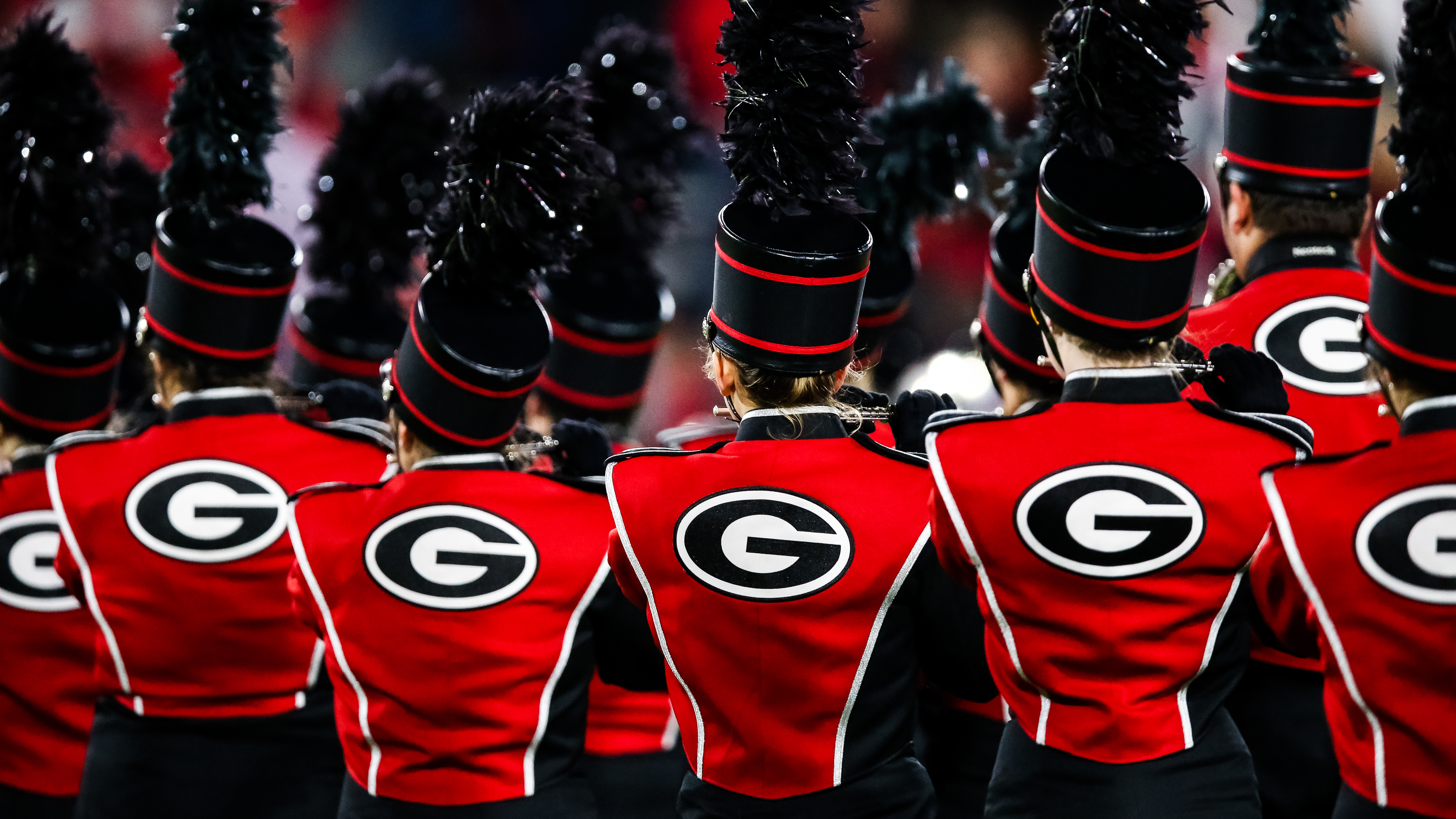
The University of Georgia Redcoat Marching Band.

The Georgia Redcoat Marching Band, commonly referred to as "The Redcoats", is the official marching band of the University of Georgia. Founded in 1905 as a part of the Military Department, the Redcoat Band has over 400 members and plays at all home football games.

== Membership ==
The Redcoats are primarily made up of brass and woodwind instruments. The band fields piccolos, clarinets, alto and tenor saxes, trumpets, mellophones, trombones, baritones, and sousaphones.

The Redcoat Drumline (PDTK) performs with the marching band as well. The drumline consists of snares, tenors, basses, cymbals, and a front ensemble (the Red Pit). The Red Pit consists of marimbas, vibraphones, a drumset, a glockenspiel, a xylophone, a synth, and occasionally other instruments. The exact makeup of both the battery and the front ensemble varies year to year in accordance with funding and available players for each instrument.

=== Auxiliaries ===
Auxiliary performers accompany the Redcoats, including flag and rifle squads. Additionally, the band is joined by the UGA Georgettes, who are the official dance team of the band, and the UGA Majorettes, a baton-twirling group with a feature twirler.

== History ==
=== Early Years (1905-1955) ===
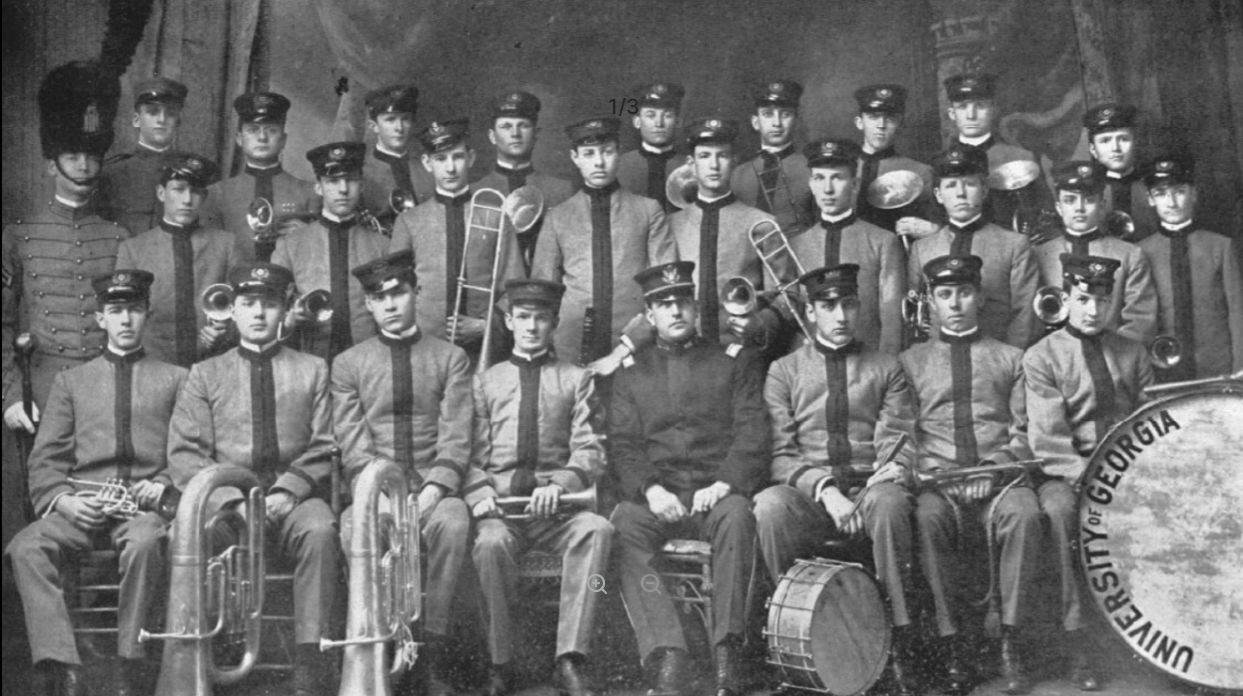
Early Photo of the Cadet Corps

Originally called the University of Georgia Cadet Corps, Georgia's marching band was founded on October 31, 1905, as part of the UGA Military Department, with 20 all-male military cadets.

The band's first fight song was likely the "Red and Black March," which was composed in 1908 by R. E. Haughey, who directed the university's first band from 1905 to 1909. The only known reference to the piece is in a history of the Redcoat Band written in 1962 by then Master's student and band member Andrew Davidson, which briefly mentions the march as “Georgia’s first original school song” and notes that “all copies of the work have been lost," until 2009, when former redcoat, Lloyd Winstead, discovered a copy of the piece being sold on E-Bay for $12.50.

The band's first non-military performance was at the 1906 Georgia-Clemson baseball game. For the first 25 years of the band's existence, members split their time between their studies, their military drill, the band, and the athletic events they were required to attend. During this time, the school song "Glory, Glory to Old Georgia", arranged by bandsman and future Director of the Music Department Hugh Hodgson, became associated with the university. At a game against Georgia Tech in the late 1900s, a reporter for the Atlanta Journal who was not aware of the song's adoption, complained about "the incessant playing of "John Brown's Body", one of many songs that share the melody of uncertain origin.

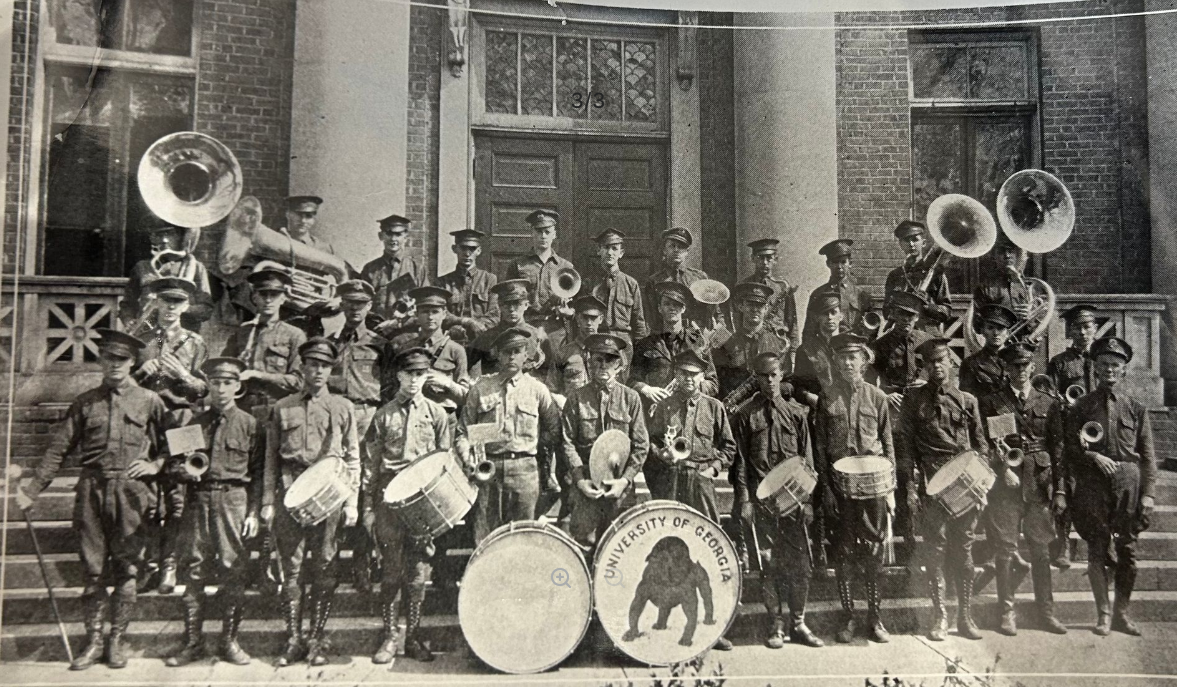
1917 Cadet Corps

The band was also a common feature of the parades held in the city of Athens, such as the 1915 Woodmen of the World Convention parade, and a parade signaling America's entry into World War I. Throughout the 1920s and 30s, the band, still under the Military Department, expanded by allowing non-military musicians to join, encouraged by the introduction of band scholarships. The band began to make short trips with the football team, depending on funding. In preparing for a fixture with Auburn in Columbus, Georgia, the band raised $700 for the train journey by instituting a "tag sale" among students, after which they had money left over for necessary repairs.

During the 1935 Georgia Bulldog football season, Georgia was scheduled to play Louisiana State in November. The Governor of Louisiana arranged for Louisiana to be represented by the Golden Band From Tigerland, one of the largest marching bands in the country. After seeing the small Georgia band against the LSU band, the alumni and athletic associations began to fund the expansion of the band with more instruments and members. Although, like most college and university bands, the number dwindled during World War II, the band had expanded again by 1955.

=== The Dancz Era (1955-1991) ===
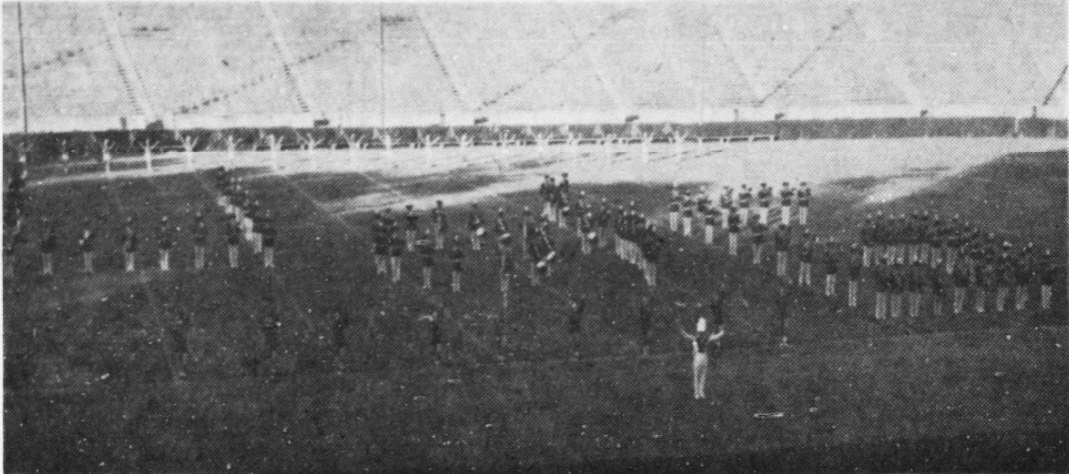
Redcoats practicing at Sanford Stadium in 1956

In 1955, Dr. Mitchell handpicked Roger Dancz as Director, and the Redcoat Band excelled under Roger’s leadership. Roger brought his wife, Phyllis Dancz, to UGA with him, who became the Director of the Auxiliaries.

Before their arrival, the band was known simply as the Georgia Marching Band. With the arrival of the Danczes, the band began to grow in size and perform more elaborate halftime shows. In 1956, the band had 96 playing members, with eight dancing majorettes, and 20 flag-twirlers. In 1959, Phyllis Dancz formed the "Georgettes", a dance line that performs alongside the band during the pre-game and halftime shows. Later on, the Bulldog Banners, later known as the Georgia Flag Line, was formed to add color and motion to the halftime show.

There are several stories as to how the Redcoats got their nickname. One version has an Atlanta reporter writing about a joint concert among the bands of Georgia and Georgia Tech. While the Tech band was known as the “yellow-jacketed band,” the reporter found it necessary to dub UGA’s band as “the red-coated band." However, no one has yet cited or dated the original newspaper clipping, so the story remains somewhat of a mystery among Redcoat band members and Redcoat Alumni.

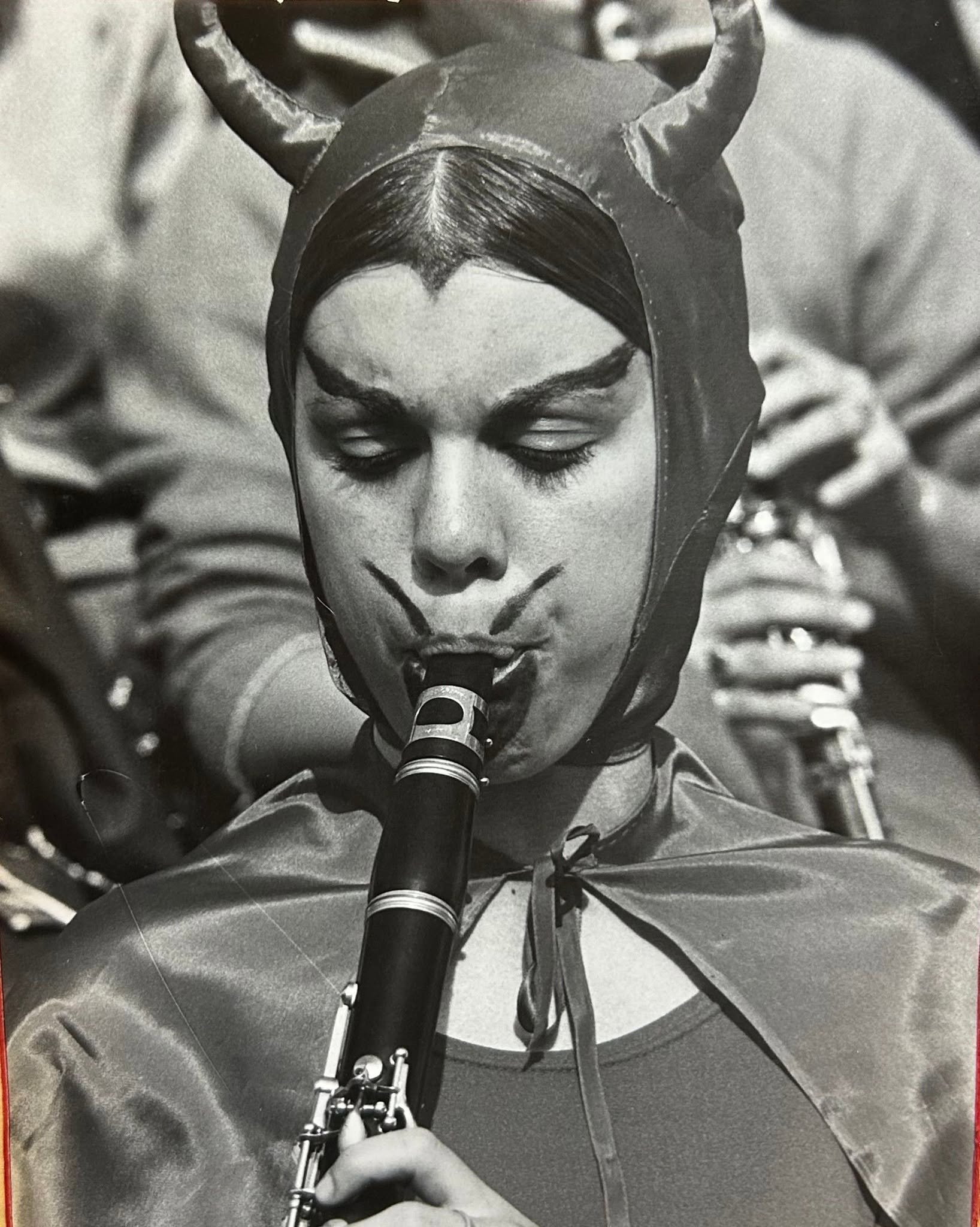
A Band Member Performing during the 1977 "Halloween Show"

The 1970s were perhaps the most prolific era of the Redcoats in terms of halftime shows. Shows performed by the Redcoats during this time included the "Six Flags" show, which featured bicycles, clowns, and balloons, and the "Halloween Show", in which band members dressed in Halloween costumes and performed music from horror films. One show that received particularly wide commentary was the "Wedding Show", held during the 1978 Georgia-Vanderbilt game, during which a couple got married in a three-minute ceremony during halftime. Every aspect of the wedding ceremony was donated by Athens-area businesses. The performance was originally intended as a publicity opportunity for a movie called The Wedding, starring Desi Arnaz Jr., but those plans fell through.

The Redcoats began the 1980s as the marching band of the national football champions. The Redcoats traveled to New Orleans for three consecutive years from 1980 to 1983 for the Sugar Bowl. During this time, the band purchased several new "silver" sousaphones, some of which are still in use as of the 2026 season.

=== Recent Decades (1991-Present) ===
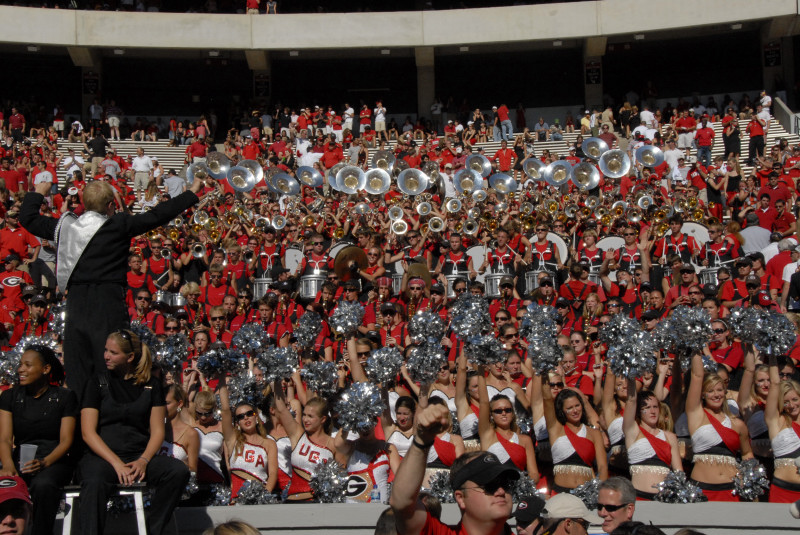
The Redcoat Band in the stands of Sanford Stadium

During the 1990s, the band began focusing more on "corps" style marching, a format influenced by the major drum and bugle corps of which many Redcoats are members. In 1995, the Redcoats were outfitted in the first new uniforms since 1982, with a new logo. In 2000, the Redcoats received the Sudler Trophy for the "close historical relationship and outstanding contribution of Intercollegiate Marching Bands to the American way of life", the first band in the Southeastern Conference to do so.

During the 2011–2012 season, the band presented a restructured pregame show, including some familiar elements, such as forming The Arch (a symbol of the University of Georgia), and the traditional "Spell Georgia Cheer" that used to take place during halftime. During this season, the Redcoats also moved from their seating in the northeast corner of the stadium to the west endzone, in an attempt to make the Redcoats more audible to the entire stadium. However, they returned to their previous location for the 2012–2013 season.

Current Director, Dr. Brett Bawcum, was officially named Director of Athletic Bands on July 1, 2020. Bawcum previously served as Associate Director of Athletic Bands, Assistant Director of Bands since 2014.

== Pregame show ==
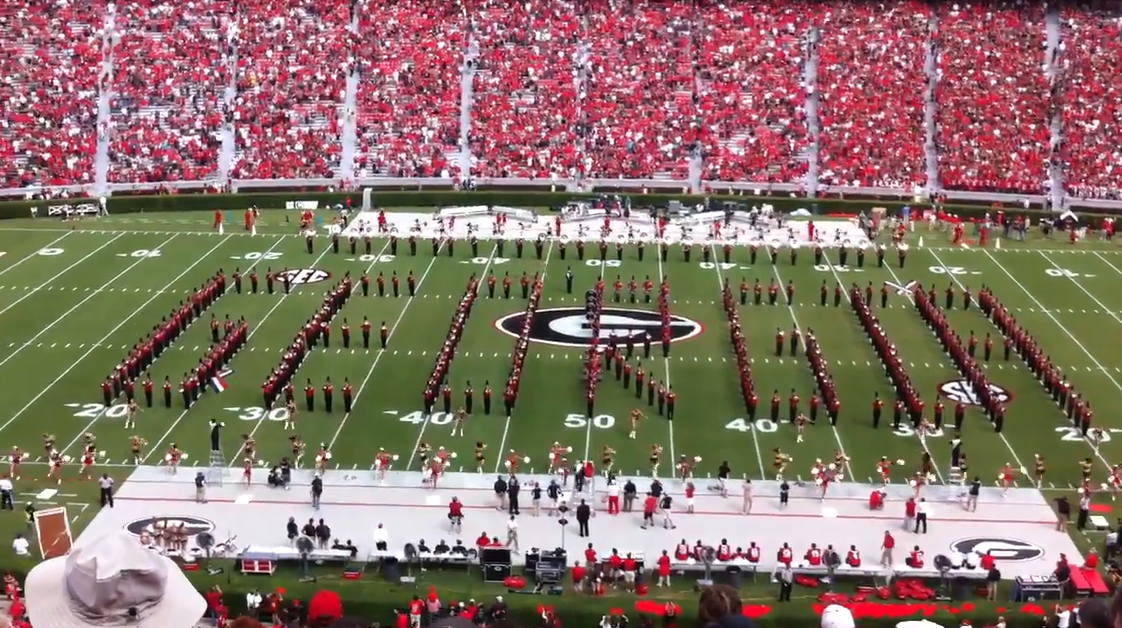
"Georgia" Letter Blocks, 2011.

The current Redcoat Band pregame show incorporates various aspects of Georgia's football history and culture. The Feature Twirlers and Hairy Dawg start in the middle of the field. Hairy Dawg then goes onto the sidelines while the band runs on the field. The show starts with the band saluting three sides of the stadium with "Go Dawgs". As the band forms The Arch they play Georgia's rally song "Glory".

Remaining in the Arch formation, the Redcoats perform Georgia's Alma Mater and the national anthem, before leading the crowd into the "Spell Georgia Cheer". The Redcoat Band then forms the image of the state of Georgia, with the feature twirlers in the spot of Athens, as the crowd sings along to UGA's official fight song "Hail to Georgia". There follows a performance of "The Battle Hymn of the Bulldog Nation", initiated by a solo trumpet player in the southwest corner of the stadium, followed by the "It's Saturday In Athens" pregame video and the football team entrance to “Krypton Fanfare” followed by "Glory".

== The Band "Chant" ==
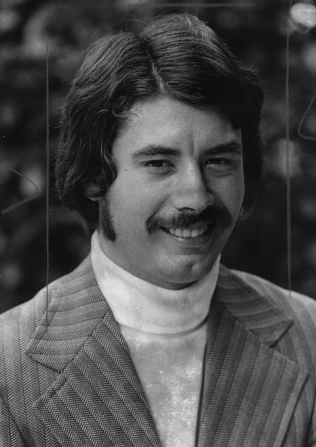
Gary Teske, 1977.

The Band "Chant," also referred to as just "The Chant," was started by band director Gary Teske in 1975 in his first year with the University of Georgia. Teske graduated from Syracuse University and helped create the original version of the chant while he was there, adapting the lyrics when he got to Athens.

While the exact original lyrics of the Chant remain unknown, the Band's official lyrics to the chant that are sung today are as follows:

"Hey, lift your head up to the sky... 'Cause we're the Redcoats passing by... And if you heard what I just said... Get down on your knees and bow your head... Go Dawgs! (4x)."

Continued... "Hey, what's that coming down the track? A huge machine that's red and black. Ain't nothin' finer in the land... than the Georgia Redcoat Marching Band! Go Dawgs! (4x)."

=== Lost Verses ===
Over the years, the Chant evolved, and with it so did the lyrics. There exist two known "Lost Verses" of the band chant that read as follows:

Verse One: "Hey what’s that coming down the lane? A huge band let me explain. The loudest sound you’ll ever hear. It makes you stand right up and cheer. Go Dawgs (4x)"

Verse Two: "Hey what’s that coming down the street? 300 pairs of marching feet. Let’s face it folks we’ve stacked the deck. It’s Glory to Georgia to Hell with Tech! Go Dawgs (4x)"

== The "Dixie" Controversy ==
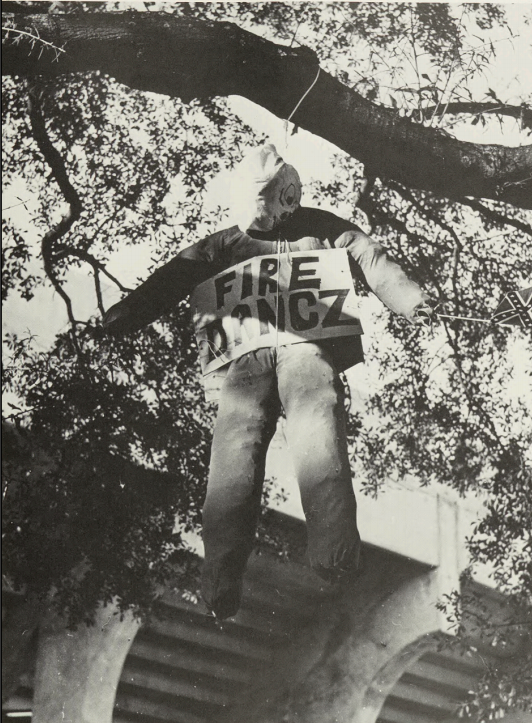
An effigy of Director of Bands Roger Dancz was "hung" outside of Sanford Stadium. From the 1972 Pandora.

In 1955, coinciding with the appointment of Roger Dancz as the next director of the marching band, the name of the organization was changed to the "Dixie Redcoat Marching Band." For the next 16 years, it would remain this way under Dancz's leadership.

However, in October 1971, Director of Bands Roger Dancz decided to remove the word 'Dixie' from the Redcoat Band's name, along with the song 'Dixie' from the band's repertoire. The decision was met with protest from some of the UGA student body and Georgia fans alike. Dissidents to the decision even hung an effigy of Dancz from a tree outside of Sanford Stadium.

3 years after the change was made, several Student Government Association (SGA) officials held a referendum on the reinstatement of the song. A total of 4843 students turned out to express their opinion on the controversial issue. The final tally was 3567 to 1270 in favor of 'Dixie' being played at athletic events.

In response to the vote, Dancz likened it to "the students having a referendum on where Coach (Vince) Dooley ought to go to the Wishbone (football offense)."

== Athletic bands ==
=== Derbies Pep Band ===
The Derbies Pep Band is directed by one or more student directors, under the supervision of faculty and staff. Derbies perform in situations where attendance by the full band is not feasible. This includes the UGA freshmen welcome in Sanford Stadium, the Jacksonville Bulldog Club Party at the annual Georgia Florida game, and away games not attended by the full band. Membership is chosen by the band captains and is determined by ability, leadership, and seniority.

=== Fall Sports Band ===
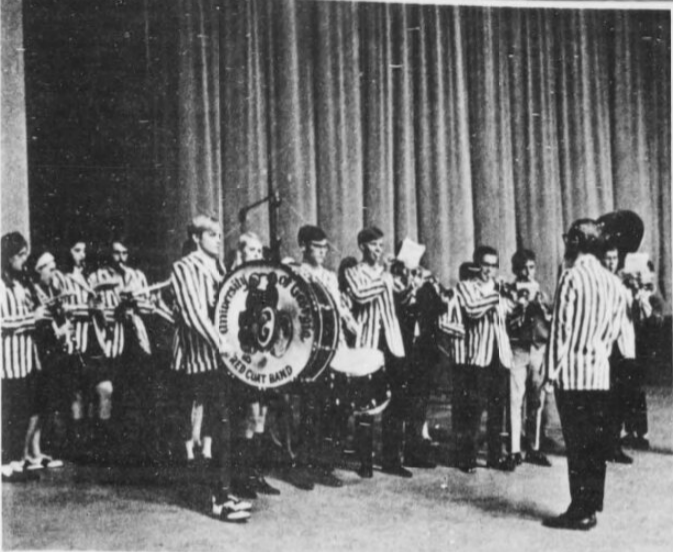
Redcoats Pep Band at a UGA basketball game in 1969

Formerly known as Volleyball Band, the Fall Sports Band supports volleyball, soccer (drumline only), and men's and women's basketball events that occur during the fall semester and during the holiday break. This group is also under the direction of student directors, working closely with graduate assistants, faculty, and staff. Membership for this group is typically chosen from the Derbies Pep Band.

The Fall Sports band originated with the Dixie Redcoat Pep Band, which was composed of smaller units of the band and was originally organized in 1967 by Band Director Roger Dancz to perform at Georgia Basketball games. These original pep bands were composed of thirty musicians each.

=== Spring Sports Band ===
The Basketball Pep Band is under the direction of the associate director of Athletic Bands and graduate assistants. Membership is selected from members of the Redcoat Band, with additional personnel included when space is available. It performs at all home gymnastics meets, all men's and women's home basketball games, most basketball postseason tournaments, and select events in other sports, including tennis and softball.

=== Soccer Drumline ===
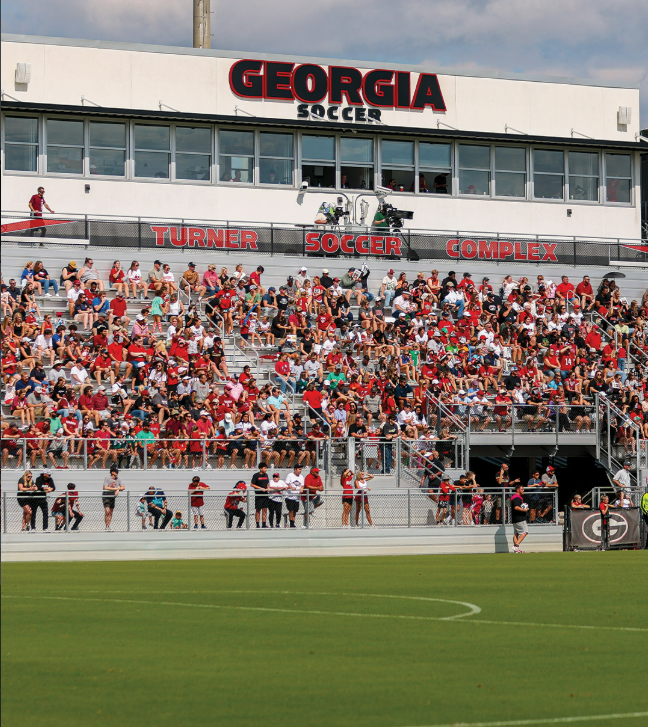
Turner Soccer Complex on a game day.

A select number of Georgia Redcoat Drumline members will compose the Soccer Drumline, performing at certain home UGA Soccer games. This ensemble is under the direction of Dr. John Cypert and Cesar Moncada and is considered a significant factor in making games challenging for opposing teams.

The Soccer Drumline has been credited for being a huge presence at Turner Soccer Complex, rattling opposing teams while making the UGA Soccer team reportedly play even harder.

== Appearances ==
=== Recurring Performances ===
The Redcoat Band performs at all Georgia home games, and travels to the Georgia-Florida game in Jacksonville each year. The full band also makes occasional road game appearances, typically at Auburn and Georgia Tech. In the past, the full Redcoat Band has accompanied the team to road trips at Clemson, Tennessee, Alabama, and South Carolina, and neutral site games held in Atlanta. The Redcoat Band also performs at all Georgia bowl game appearances and all College Football Playoff game appearances.

=== Individual Performances ===
On October 18, 1959, the Redcoats performed at the halftime show for the then-Washington Redskins.

On October 4, 1970, the Redcoats performed at the halftime show for the Atlanta Falcons.

In May 2006, as part of a cultural exchange program, the Redcoats took a two-week trip to China, performing at least five shows for as many as 40,000 Chinese citizens per show.

== Notable Alumni ==
=== Sol Abrams (1924-2016) ===
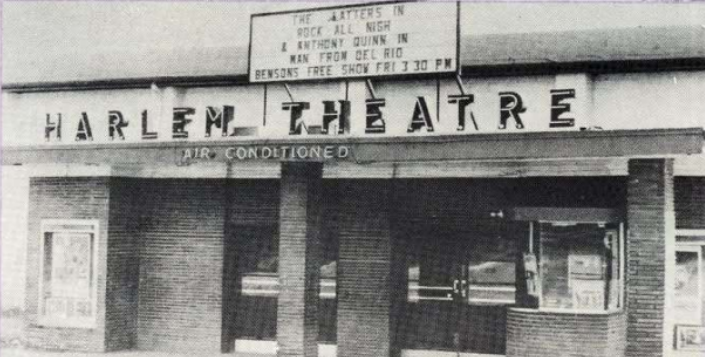
Harlem Theater. Athens, Georgia.

Sol Abrams (Solomon Zolman Abrams) was born June 10, 1924, to Doris Kahn Abrams and Philip Abrams in Avon Park, Florida, and was a renowned business owner in Athens, Georgia.

Abrams joined the U.S. Navy and served as a 35-mm film motion picture photographer during World War II. Enrolling at the University of Georgia after his service, he played the baritone in the University of Georgia Redcoat Marching band. In 1951, he built and opened the Harlem Theater, which was a part-time movie theater and African American live music venue located on West Broad Street. Sol hired a Black-only staff for all operations. Famous musicians performed at the Harlem Theater, including Little Richard, Piano Red, Chuck Berry, and others, until it closed sometime in the 1960s due to demolition caused by urban renewal in downtown Athens. In 1972, Abrams opened one of the first multiplex theaters in the South, Beechwood Cinemas, located in Athens, Georgia. Abrams was given a Lifetime Achievement Statesman Award by the National Association of Theater Owners, Show South, in 1999. Abrams passed away on August 31, 2016, at the age of 92.
