= Glory, Glory (fight song) =

Rally song at the University of Georgia

- Music: William Steffe, 1856; arranged by Hugh Hodgson, 1915

Audio sample
- "Glory, Glory" as performed by the Georgia Redcoat Marching Band: file; help

"Glory, Glory" is the rally song for the Georgia Bulldogs, the athletics teams for the University of Georgia. The melody of "Glory, Glory" is the same as that of "Say Brothers Will You Meet Us," "John Brown's Body," and "Battle Hymn of the Republic." The song was arranged for the University of Georgia Band by member, and later Department of Music chair, Hugh Hodgson in 1915.

Although "Glory, Glory" is the de facto fight song, UGA's official fight song is "Hail to Georgia".

== Lyrics and uses ==
Glory, glory to old Georgia!
Glory, glory to old Georgia!
Glory, glory to old Georgia!
G-E-O-R-G-I-A
Glory, glory to old Georgia!
Glory, glory to old Georgia!
Glory, glory to old Georgia!
G-E-O-R-G-I-A

The song is played by the Georgia Redcoat Marching Band when the Bulldogs take the field, as well as after touchdowns and other events favorable to the Georgia football team. Georgia fans often replace the "G-E-O-R-G-I-A" phrase with "To Hell with..." and insert the name of a rival or a particular school that the Bulldogs happen to be playing at the time. During games versus South Carolina, they can be heard singing, "And To Hell with USC." One of the most popular alternate lines is "And to Hell with Georgia Tech!"

When Georgia wins a football game, the Georgia Redcoat Band plays a version of "Glory, Glory" that ends in Beethoven's "Ode to Joy." This special ending, known as the "Angel Tag," is never performed outside of Georgia victories.

== The Battle Hymn of the Bulldog Nation ==
A slower version, using a much more complete melody of "The Battle Hymn of the Republic" is played before the start of each home football game on campus at Sanford Stadium. A trumpet-playing member of the Georgia Redcoat Marching Band takes a position in the upper deck of the south side stands, near the west endzone, and reverently plays the first fourteen notes of the Battle Hymn to a cheering crowd, while a historical video montage of the football team's greatest moments, narrated by UGA legend and famous former Georgia play-by-play announcer Larry Munson, is displayed on the west endzone scoreboard. The rest of the band on the field then finishes the first stanza and the rest of the song, which is referred to as "The Battle Hymn of the Bulldog Nation" by Munson.

During the solo, the Bulldog fans in Sanford Stadium rise to their feet, take off their hats, and point them in the direction of the soloist as a sign of respect. This tradition was added following the internet publication of a tribute to UGA football entitled "Seven Notes On A Trumpet" penned by an unnamed fan of UGA, originally posted on a UGA sports-related internet message board called the Dawg Vent. This is one of the most hallowed traditions of Georgia Bulldog football. The music for the Battle Hymn, arranged by UGA student arranger Jeff Simmons in 1987, was originally written as a brass warmup, but has since become the Redcoat Band's signature piece.

== Sources ==
- Songs of the Georgia Bulldogs
- Fight Songs Lyrics
