= The Battle Hymn of Cooperation =

Sung to the tune of the "Battle Hymn of the Republic" (which itself was an adaptation of "John Brown's Body", a marching song of the American Civil War), The Battle Hymn of Cooperation was widely popular throughout the American consumers' cooperative movement from the 1930s onward. It remained a favorite until well after the Second World War, for example at the annual meetings of the Consumers Cooperative Association of Missouri, where thousands of members joined in singing it. The hymn can be considered as the official song of the Cooperative League of the USA (CLUSA), later renamed the National Cooperative Business Association (NCBA).

The hymn was originally written in February 1932 for a charity revue of the Consumers Cooperative Services, which operated a chain of cooperative cafeterias in New York City. The authors were two CCS workers: Elizabeth Mead (of the bakery) and Carl Ferguson (a busboy), who won a $5 prize for composing "the best song on cooperation". It is likely that the cooperative version of the hymn was influenced by the popular union song "Solidarity Forever", written by Ralph Chaplin in 1915.

== Lyrics ==
Oh, we are a mighty army, though we bear no sword and gun,
We're enlisted 'till the struggle for cooperation's won,
And beneath our banner blazoned "One for all and all for one,"
Consumers marching on!

Chorus:
Come and let us work together
Come and let us work together
Come and let us work together
Consumers marching on!

It was long ago in Rochdale that our cause saw first the light,
We were sadly few in numbers but our principles were right,
But today we count our millions as we girt ourselves to fight:
Consumers marching on!

Chorus

Oh, the world today is suffering filled with poverty and pain,
And the day has come for freedom from the curse of private gain,
For all may live in comfort 'neath Cooperation's reign.
Consumers marching on!

Chorus

Oh we know our scheme is righteous and we know our cause is just;
For upon the brotherhood of man we firmly base our trust:
Let us strive to win the victory, for win we can and must.
Consumers marching on!

Chorus
