= Consumers Cooperative Services =

Consumers Cooperative Services (CCS) was a white collar consumers' cooperative in New York City which ran a chain of cooperative restaurants, bakeries and grocery stores. It was founded in 1920 by a group of socially minded women, among them Mary E. Arnold, Mabel Reed, Dorothy Kenyon, Mary LaDame and Ruth True.

Starting with one cafeteria, the association opened additional branches in the financial district of New York. It was operating eleven restaurants by 1935. In 1944 CCS became active in the grocery field, taking over four grocery co-ops from other cooperative associations. The grocery stores were never as successful as had been hoped. In 1952 there was only one left, in Greenwich Village. The number of cafeterias declined after the Second World War as well. There were seven in 1945 and four in 1952. By that time the bakery was also discontinued. In spite of these developments, CCS grew in membership from 4,500 in 1935 to 5,536 in 1945, 5,536 in 1946, and 8,291 in 1948. Annual sales reached a peak of $2,049,839 in 1949. CCS declined during the 1950s, and is no longer in existence.

CCS was a progressive consumer cooperative, which took "the larger view in things cooperative". It was active in consumer and cooperative education and took a lead in establishing new consumer cooperatives on the East Coast. CCS used part of its accumulated profits (patronage funds) to build a 12-story cooperative apartment complex in Lower Manhattan with 66 apartments which was opened in 1935. The cooperative song The Battle Hymn of Cooperation originated with employees of CCS who wrote it for a revue in 1932.
