= Blood on the Risers =

American paratrooper song

Song
- Language: English
- Written: World War II
- Genre: Military song; dark humor

"Blood on the Risers" is an American paratrooper song originating during World War II. It is set to the tune of "The Battle Hymn of the Republic", which itself was adapted from "John Brown's Body", a popular marching song during the American Civil War. The song remains popular among modern airborne units in the United States and throughout the world, and it has been referenced in various films, television series, video games, and books.

== Content ==
Sung to the tune of "The Battle Hymn of the Republic", which itself was adapted from "John Brown's Body", a marching song from World War II, the song tells of a fatal training jump of a rookie paratrooper whose parachute fails to deploy, resulting in him falling to his death. Each verse describes the man's death and the subsequent condition of his body in the aftermath. The chorus mimics the chorus in "The Battle Hymn of the Republic", replacing the lyrics "Glory, glory, hallelujah! His truth is marching on" with "Gory, gory, what a hell of a way to die! He ain't gonna jump no more."

The song is a cautionary tale on the dangers of improper preparation for a parachute jump. The protagonist does almost everything right but forgets to hook up his static line, which would automatically deploy his main parachute. Upon discovering this error during the jump, he deploys his reserve chute in a bad falling position. He becomes entangled in the parachute's canopy and risers, falls uncontrollably, and dies upon impact with the ground. American parachute rigs during World War II stored the reserve parachute in a belly bag, so deploying it in a bad falling position could easily lead to an accident similar to the one described in the song. "Risers" are the four straps that connect the suspension lines of the parachute canopy to the parachute harness.

Modern renditions by the 82nd Airborne Division often include the first verse of "Beautiful Streamer," a similar skydiving folk song set to the tune of Stephen Foster's "Beautiful Dreamer." "Beautiful Streamer" describes a recreational skydiver whose main canopy fails to deploy; he reaches for his reserve ripcord but "the [damn thing | handle] was gone." He contemplates his fate while falling, ending with a warning that "jumping's no fun."

== Origins ==
The origins of the song are unclear; the lyrics are unattributed. It has been proposed that the song was written verse-by-verse by those in training at Fort Benning.

Newspapers during World War II called the song a "paratrooper favorite". Paratroopers would sing it on the plane before jumping.

== Modern usage ==
The song is associated with all current American airborne units, including the 11th Airborne Division, 82nd Airborne Division, the 101st Airborne Division, 173rd Airborne Brigade and the 120th CTS (United States), as well as British airborne units. It is known as "Mancha Roja" (Spanish for "Red Stain") in airborne units from multiple Latin American countries. In Spain it is called "Sangre en las cuerdas" ("Blood on the lines"). It is occasionally used as a marching cadence.

== In popular culture ==
This song has been featured in the television miniseries Band of Brothers.

World War II veteran Vincent Speranza was recorded singing the chant in 2019; the video has more than one million views on YouTube as of December 2023. Speranza later recorded his own version of the chant.

Near the beginning of the film Screaming Eagles, the men sing the song as they come back from leave.
