= Vincent Speranza =

American World War II veteran (1925–2023)

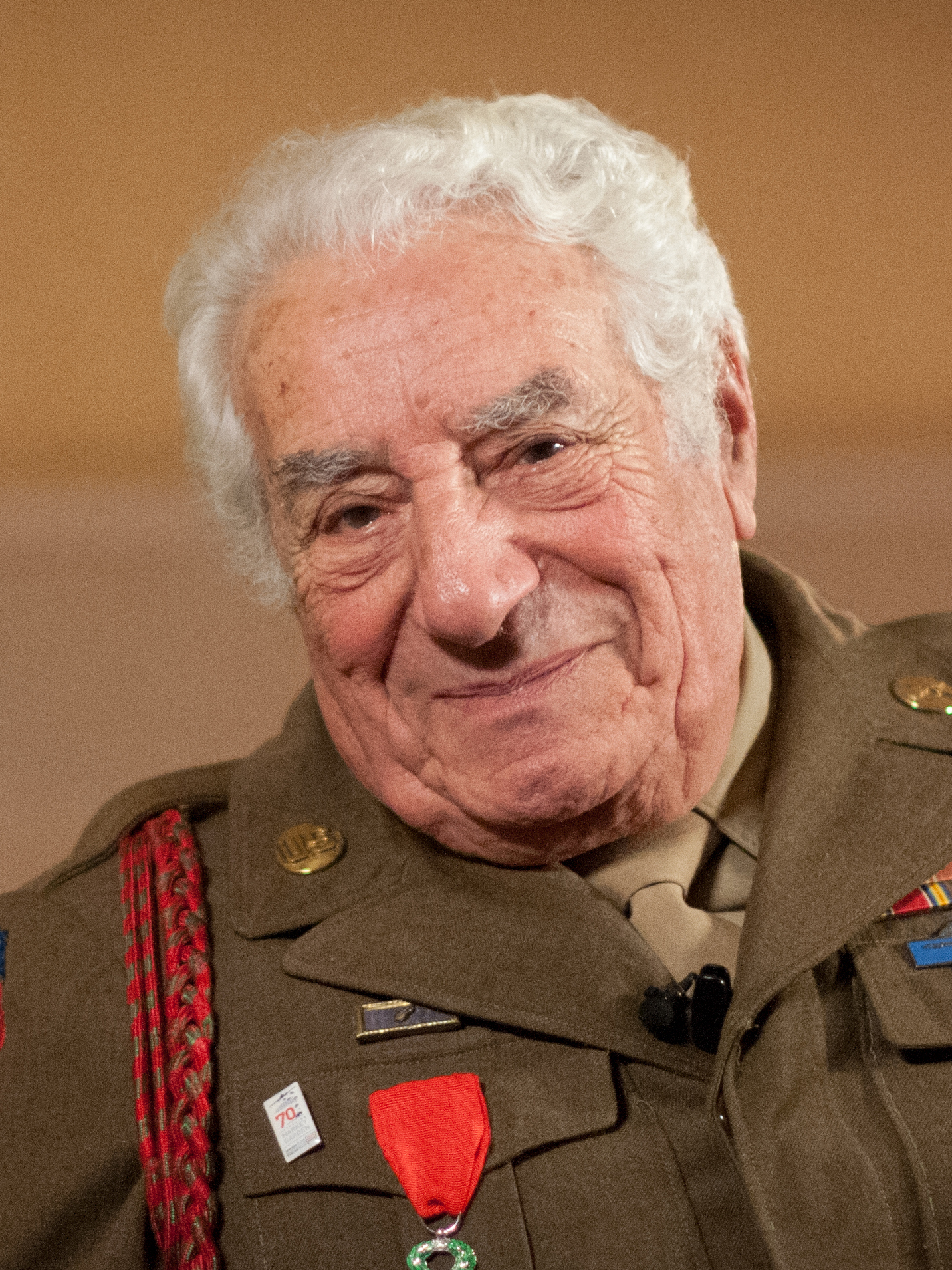
- Speranza in 2015
- Born: March 23, 1925; New York City, U.S.
- Died: August 2, 2023 (aged 98); Springfield, Illinois, U.S.
- Spouse: Iva Leftwich (m. 1948; died 2017)
- Military career
- Allegiance: United States
- Branch: United States Army
- Service years: 1943–1946
- Rank: Private first class
- Units: 501st Infantry Regiment, 101st Airborne Division
- Conflicts: World War II

Vincent J. Speranza (March 23, 1925 – August 2, 2023) was an American private who served in the United States Army during World War II.

Born in New York City, Speranza grew up on Staten Island with a large Italian family during the Great Depression. After graduating from high school in January 1943, he enrolled at City College of New York and enlisted in the United States Army at the age of 18, after being previously rejected due to being 16. While in the Army, he was sent to Camp Upton in New York State, Suffolk County, Yaphank, before being sent to Fort Benning in Georgia, where he trained with the 87th Infantry Division. He volunteered for the Parachute Infantry and was sent overseas, with the 501st Parachute Infantry Regiment of the 101st Airborne Division, to Scotland, England, Belgium and France, where his unit would later fight in the Battle of the Bulge. His first engagement was in the Siege of Bastogne, where he operated a machine gun from a foxhole. During the siege, he visited a wounded comrade at a field hospital. The soldier asked for a drink, and Speranza, who had no containers for the drink, found a beer tap and used his helmet as a container. He was caught by the regimental surgeon and was reprimanded. He was discharged in January 1946, spending 144 days in combat. His highest rank was Private first class.

After the end of World War II, Speranza lived in Allied-occupied France and the Netherlands until moving back to New York in December 1945, becoming a teacher at Curtis High School. He received a Purple Heart, Bronze Star and a Presidential Unit Citation. In 1948, he married Iva Leftwich, who was his wife until her death in 2017. They had three children. In 2014, he wrote a book, NUTS!: A 101st Airborne Division Machine Gunner at Bastogne. He died on August 2, 2023, at the age of 98.

== Early life ==
Speranza was born on March 23, 1925, son of Francesco and Francesca Speranza, in the Hell's Kitchen neighborhood of Manhattan, New York. He spent his childhood on Staten Island in a large and extended Italian family during the Great Depression. He had three brothers and four sisters. He graduated from high school in January 1943 and then enrolled at the City College of New York.

== Military service ==
Speranza in the early 1940s

In 1943, after graduating from high school, Speranza enlisted in the United States Army. He had tried to join at the age of 16, but had to wait until he was 18. Speranza was sent to Camp Upton in Yaphank, Suffolk county, New York where he stayed until being sent to Fort Benning in Georgia where he trained for the infantry with the 87th Infantry Division, later volunteering for the Parachute Infantry, which he joined after completing a stint in Parachute School.

Speranza was sent overseas with Company H, 3rd Battalion, 501st Parachute Infantry Regiment, 101st Airborne Division from Camp Shanks on board the Queen Mary, landing in Scotland, later moving to England, Belgium and finally France. His unit arrived in France and would later fight in the Battle of the Bulge. Speranza's first engagement was during the Siege of Bastogne where he operated a machine gun from a foxhole in a forward position outside of the town. During the siege, he visited a wounded comrade at the field hospital set up in a local church, where his friend asked for a drink. Searching through the ruins of the town, he found a working beer tap and filled his helmet for lack of any other container. On delivering the beverage and returning for a second load, he was discovered by a medical officer and reprimanded. He wouldn't learn until 65 years later, that this act of kindness was still remembered, and had inspired a local brew, Airborne Beer, which is served in ceramic pots shaped like helmets.

Speranza spent a total of 144 days in combat and was discharged in January 1946. His highest rank was Private first class.

== Life after the war ==
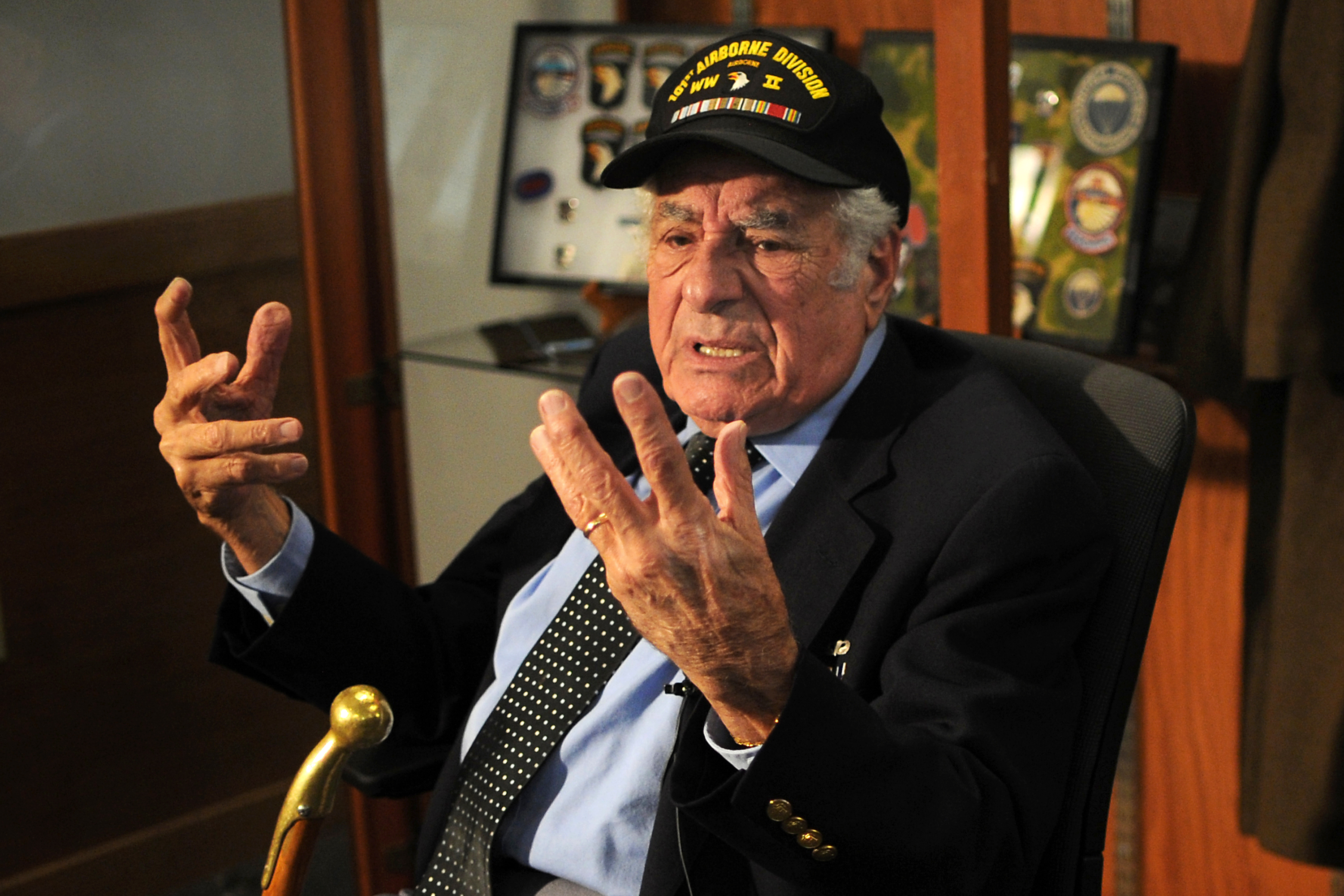
Speranza in 2020

After the end of World War II, Speranza stayed in Allied-occupied France and Netherlands until December 1945, and then returned to New York, where he became a teacher at Curtis High School. For his service, he received both the Purple Heart and Bronze Star decorations along with a Presidential Unit Citation.

Speranza later married Iva in 1948, remaining together until her death in 2017.

As part of the 75th anniversary commemoration of Operation Market Garden in September 2019, Speranza was one of two veterans who participated in a parachute drop over North Brabant between Eerde and Schijndel.

In 2020, Vincent recorded his own version of the official Airborne song Blood on the risers.

During the 2021 Christmas period, Speranza was featured in an hour-long broadcast by the Overloon War Museum. This was one of a series of videos released by the museum while it was closed due to restrictions from the COVID-19 pandemic in the Netherlands.

In 2022, after participating in veteran events in Europe for 12 years, Speranza announced he would no longer make the journey from the U.S. to Europe, to preserve his health. The announcement came after he collapsed following a 28-hour journey home from Brussels to Springfield, Illinois.

== Personal life and death ==
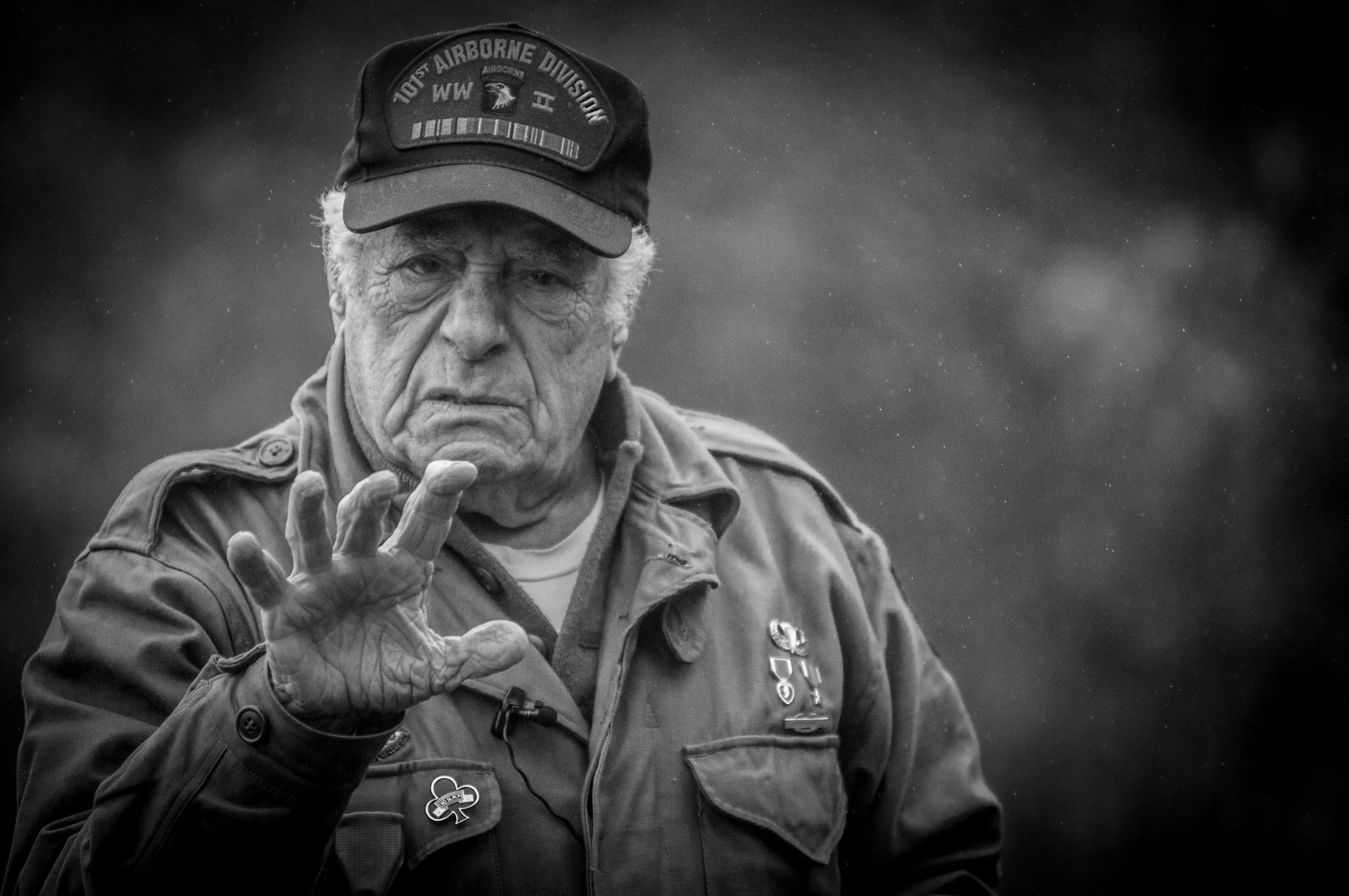
Speranza in 2015

Speranza married Iva Leftwich in 1948. They had a son, Vincent, and two daughters, Katharine and Susan. He published a book named NUTS!: A 101st Airborne Division Machine Gunner at Bastogne in 2014.

In July 2021, an interview he did for American Veterans Center was released; it has over 2.4 million views as of February 2026. In February 2023, Speranza recorded a video sharing an inspiring message to future generations; as of March 2024, it has had over 3 million views on YouTube.

Speranza died on August 2, 2023, at the Springfield Memorial Hospital, at the age of 98.

Speranza has a beer and a limited-edition watch named after him.

== Awards and decorations ==
Awards and decorations

- Combat Infantryman Badge
- Parachutist Badge
- Bronze Star Medal (1 OLC)
- Purple Heart (1 OLC)
- Army Good Conduct Medal
- World War II Victory Medal
- American Campaign Medal
- European-African-Middle Eastern Campaign Medal (with 2 campaign stars)
- Presidential Unit Citation with Oak Leaf Cluster
- French Croix de Guerre
- Legion of Honour
- Fourragère
- Honorary Medal in Bronze, municipality of Nuenen, Gerwen en Nederwetten

== Filmography ==
Year	Title	Role	Other notes	Sources
2019	Libertas: 75th Anniversary of D-Day	Himself		

== See also ==
- List of notable residents in the Manhattan's Hell's Kitchen neighborhood
- List of notable residents of Auburn, New York
- List of notable members of the 101st Airborne Division
