= The Battle Hymn of the Republic, Updated =

1900 song by Mark Twain

"The Battle Hymn of the Republic, Updated" (otherwise known as "The Battle Hymn of the Republic (Brought Down to Date)") was written in 1900 by Mark Twain, as a parody of American imperialism, in the wake of the Philippine–American War. It is written in the same tune and cadence as the original "Battle Hymn of the Republic" by Julia Ward Howe. The poem remained unpublished in Twain's lifetime and did not appear in print until 1958.

A recording was made by the Chad Mitchell Trio as "The Battle Hymn of the Republic Brought Down to Date". The lyrics were slightly modified and the verse about prostitution excised, and the first four lines from the Marines' Hymn sung over one of the choruses.

== Lyrics ==
Mine eyes have seen the orgy of the launching of the Sword;
He is searching out the hoardings where the stranger's wealth is stored;
He hath loosed his fateful lightnings, and with woe and death has scored;
His lust is marching on.

I have seen him in the watch-fires of a hundred circling camps;
They have builded him an altar in the Eastern dews and damps;
I have read his doomful mission by the dim and flaring lamps—
His night is marching on.

I have read his bandit gospel writ in burnished rows of steel:
"As ye deal with my pretensions, so with you my wrath shall deal;
Let the faithless son of Freedom crush the patriot with his heel;
Lo, Greed is marching on!"

We have legalized the strumpet and are guarding her retreat;*
Greed is seeking out commercial souls before his judgement seat;
O, be swift, ye clods, to answer him! be jubilant my feet!
Our god is marching on!

In a sordid slime harmonious Greed was born in yonder ditch,
With a longing in his bosom—and for others' goods an itch.
As Christ died to make men holy, let men die to make us rich—
Our god is marching on.

== Footnote ==
The footnote in the lyrics contained the following text:

"* NOTE: In Manila the Government has placed a certain industry under the protection of our flag. (M.T.)"

== See also ==
- List of anti-war songs
- Battle Hymn of the Republic
