= Battle Hymn of the Republic =

1862 American song by Julia Ward Howe

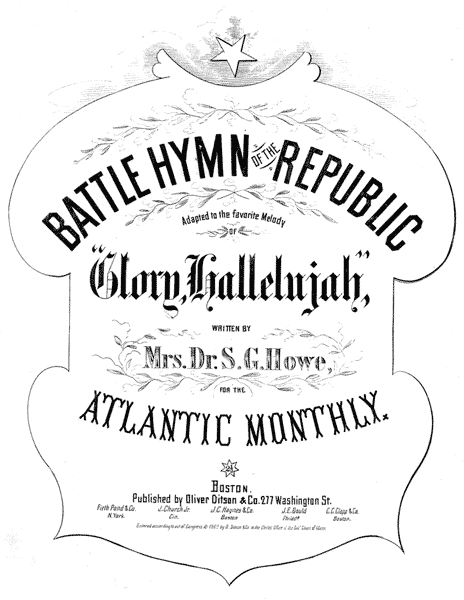
- Cover of the 1863 sheet music for the "Battle Hymn of the Republic"
- Lyrics: Julia Ward Howe, 1861; 165 years ago
- Music: William Steffe, 1856; arranged by James E. Greenleaf, C. S. Hall, and C. B. Marsh, 1861
- Published: 1862 by Oliver Ditson & Co.

Audio sample
- "The Battle Hymn of the Republic" as performed by the United States Air Force Band: file; help

The Tabernacle Choir at Temple Square and West Point Band performing "Battle Hymn of the Republic"

The "Battle Hymn of the Republic" is an American patriotic song written by the abolitionist writer Julia Ward Howe during the American Civil War. It is sometimes called "Mine Eyes Have Seen the Glory", especially outside of the United States.

Howe adapted her song from the soldiers' song "John Brown's Body" in November 1861, and sold it for $4 to The Atlantic Monthly in February 1862. In contrast to the lyrics of the soldiers' song, her version links the Union cause with God's vengeance at the Day of Judgment (through allusions to biblical passages such as Isaiah 63:1–6, Revelation 19 and Revelation 14:14–19).

Julia Ward Howe was married to Samuel Gridley Howe, a scholar in education of the blind. Both Samuel and Julia were also active leaders in anti-slavery politics and strong supporters of the Union. Samuel was a member of the Secret Six, the group who funded John Brown's work.

== History ==
=== "Oh! Brothers" ===
The tune and some of the lyrics of "John Brown's Body" came from a much older folk hymn called "Say, Brothers will you Meet Us", also known as "Glory Hallelujah", which had been developed in the oral hymn tradition of revivalist camp meetings of the late 1700s, though it was first published in the early 1800s. In the first known version, "Canaan's Happy Shore", the text includes the verse "Oh! Brothers will you meet me (3×)/On Canaan's happy shore?" and chorus "There we'll shout and give Him glory (3×)/For glory is His own." This developed into the familiar "Glory, glory, hallelujah" chorus by the 1850s. The tune and variants of these words spread across the United States.

=== As the "John Brown's Body" song ===
At a flag-raising ceremony at Fort Warren, near Boston, Massachusetts, on Sunday, May 12, 1861, the song "John Brown's Body", using the "Oh! Brothers" tune and the "Glory, Hallelujah" chorus, was publicly played "perhaps for the first time". The American Civil War had begun the previous month.

In 1890, George Kimball wrote his account of how the 2nd Infantry Battalion of the Massachusetts militia, known as the "Tiger" Battalion, collectively worked out the lyrics to "John Brown's Body". Kimball wrote:

We had a jovial Scotchman in the battalion, named John Brown. ... [A]nd as he happened to bear the identical name of the old hero of Harper's Ferry, he became at once the butt of his comrades. If he made his appearance a few minutes late among the working squad, or was a little tardy in falling into the company line, he was sure to be greeted with such expressions as "Come, old fellow, you ought to be at it if you are going to help us free the slaves," or, "This can't be John Brown—why, John Brown is dead." And then some wag would add, in a solemn, drawling tone, as if it were his purpose to give particular emphasis to the fact that John Brown was really, actually dead: "Yes, yes, poor old John Brown is dead; his body lies mouldering in the grave."

According to Kimball, these sayings became by-words among the soldiers and, in a communal effort—similar in many ways to the spontaneous composition of camp meeting songs described above—were gradually put to the tune of "Say, Brothers":

Finally ditties composed of the most nonsensical, doggerel rhymes, setting for the fact that John Brown was dead and that his body was undergoing the process of decomposition, began to be sung to the music of the hymn above given. These ditties underwent various ramifications, until eventually the lines were reached,—

"John Brown's body lies a-mouldering in the grave,
His soul's marching on."

And,—

"He's gone to be a soldier in the army of the Lord,
His soul's marching on."

These lines seemed to give general satisfaction, the idea that Brown's soul was "marching on" receiving recognition at once as having a germ of inspiration in it. They were sung over and over again with a great deal of gusto, the "Glory, hallelujah" chorus being always added.

Some leaders of the battalion, feeling the words were coarse and irreverent, tried to urge the adoption of more fitting lyrics, but to no avail. The lyrics were soon prepared for publication by members of the battalion, together with publisher C. S. Hall. They selected and polished verses they felt appropriate, and may even have enlisted the services of a local poet to help polish and create verses.

The official histories of the old First Artillery and of the 55th Artillery (1918) also record the Tiger Battalion's role in creating the John Brown Song, confirming the general thrust of Kimball's version with a few additional details.

=== Creation of the "Battle Hymn" ===
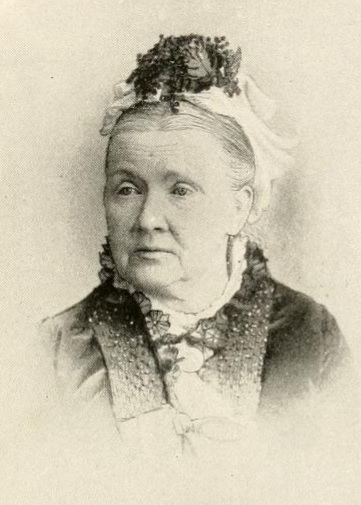
Julia Ward Howe, 1897

Kimball's battalion was dispatched to Murray, Kentucky, early in the Civil War, and Julia Ward Howe heard this song during a public review of the troops outside Washington, D.C., on Munson's Hill on the plains of Bailey's Crossroads, Virginia. Rufus R. Dawes, then in command of Company "K" of the 6th Wisconsin Volunteer Infantry, stated in his memoirs that the man who started the singing was Sergeant John Ticknor of his company. Howe's companion at the review, the Reverend James Freeman Clarke, suggested to Howe that she write new words for the fighting men's song. Staying at the Willard Hotel in Washington on the night of November 18, 1861, Howe wrote the verses to the "Battle Hymn of the Republic". Of the writing of the lyrics, Howe remembered:

I went to bed that night as usual, and slept, according to my wont, quite soundly. I awoke in the gray of the morning twilight; and as I lay waiting for the dawn, the long lines of the desired poem began to twine themselves in my mind. Having thought out all the stanzas, I said to myself, "I must get up and write these verses down, lest I fall asleep again and forget them." So, with a sudden effort, I sprang out of bed, and found in the dimness an old stump of a pencil which I remembered to have used the day before. I scrawled the verses almost without looking at the paper.

Howe's "Battle Hymn of the Republic" was first published on the front page of The Atlantic Monthly of February 1862. The sixth verse written by Howe, which is less commonly sung, was not published at that time.

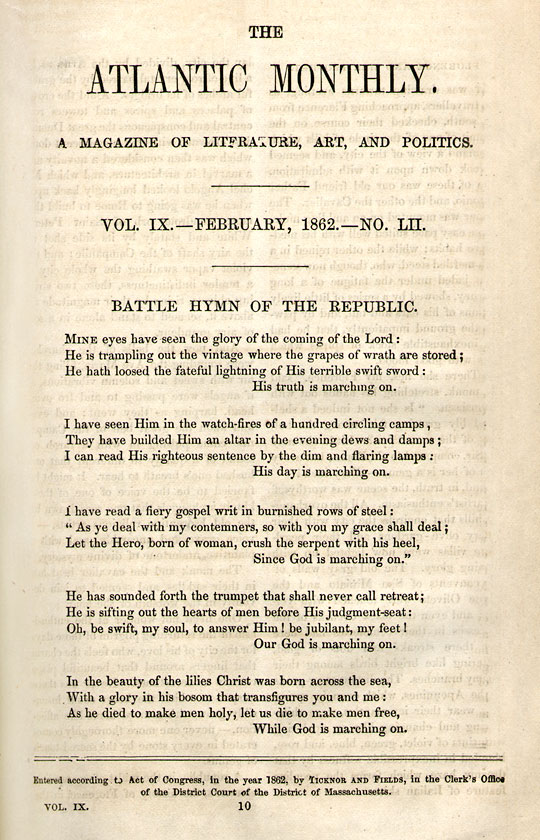
As originally published 1862 in The Atlantic Monthly

The song was also published as a broadside in 1863 by the Supervisory Committee for Recruiting Colored Regiments in Philadelphia.

Both "John Brown" and "Battle Hymn of the Republic" were published in Father Kemp's Old Folks Concert Tunes in 1874 and reprinted in 1889. Both songs had the same chorus with an additional "Glory" in the second line: "Glory! Glory! Glory! Hallelujah!"

== Score ==
"Canaan's Happy Shore" has a verse and chorus of equal metrical length and both verse and chorus share an identical melody and rhythm. "John Brown's Body" has more syllables in its verse and uses a more rhythmically active variation of the "Canaan" melody to accommodate the additional words in the verse. In Howe's lyrics, the words of the verse are packed into a yet longer line, with even more syllables than "John Brown's Body." The verse still uses the same underlying melody as the refrain, but the addition of many dotted rhythms to the underlying melody allows for the more complex verse to fit the same melody as the comparatively short refrain.

One version of the melody, in C major, begins as below. This is an example of the mediant-octave modal frame.

== Lyrics ==
Howe submitted the lyrics she wrote to The Atlantic Monthly, and it was first published in the February 1862 issue of the magazine.

=== First published version ===
Mine eyes have seen the glory of the coming of the Lord;
He is trampling out the vintage where the grapes of wrath are stored;
He hath loosed the fateful lightning of His terrible swift sword:
His truth is marching on.

(Chorus)
Glory, glory, hallelujah!
Glory, glory, hallelujah!
Glory, glory, hallelujah!
His truth is marching on.

I have seen Him in the watch-fires of a hundred circling camps,
They have builded Him an altar in the evening dews and damps;
I have read His righteous sentence by the dim and flaring lamps:
His day is marching on.

(Chorus)
Glory, glory, hallelujah!
Glory, glory, hallelujah!
Glory, glory, hallelujah!
His truth is marching on.

I have read a fiery gospel writ in burnished rows of steel:
"As ye deal with My contemners, so with you My grace shall deal";
Let the Hero, born of woman, crush the serpent with His heel,
Since God is marching on.

(Chorus)
Glory, glory, hallelujah!
Glory, glory, hallelujah!
Glory, glory, hallelujah!
His truth is marching on.

He has sounded forth the trumpet that shall never call retreat;
He is sifting out the hearts of men before His judgment-seat;
Oh, be swift, my soul, to answer Him! Be jubilant, my feet!
Our God is marching on.

(Chorus)
Glory, glory, hallelujah!
Glory, glory, hallelujah!
Glory, glory, hallelujah!
Our God is marching on.

In the beauty of the lilies Christ was born across the sea,
With a glory in His bosom that transfigures you and me.
As He died to make men holy, let us die to make men free,
While God is marching on.

(Chorus)
Glory, glory, hallelujah!
Glory, glory, hallelujah!
Glory, glory, hallelujah!
Our God is marching on.

* Some modern performances and recordings of the "Battle Hymn of the Republic" use the lyric "As He died to make men holy, let us live to make men free" as opposed to the wartime lyric originally written by Julia Ward Howe: "let us die to make men free."

=== Other versions ===
Howe's original manuscript differed slightly from the published version. Most significantly, it included a final verse:

He is coming like the glory of the morning on the wave,
He is Wisdom to the mighty, He is Succour to the brave,
So the world shall be His footstool, and the soul of Time His slave,
Our God is marching on.

(Chorus)
Glory, glory, hallelujah!
Glory, glory, hallelujah!
Glory, glory, hallelujah!
Our God is marching on!

In the 1862 sheet music, the chorus always begins:

Glory! Glory! Hallelujah!
Glory! Glory! Glory! Hallelujah!
Glory! Glory! Hallelujah!

== Recordings and public performances ==
"Battle Hymn of the Republic"

Single by Mormon Tabernacle Choir
- B-side: "The Lord's Prayer"
- Released: 1959
- Recorded: 1959
- Genre: Choral
- Length: 4:38; 3:17 (single version)
- Label: Columbia
- Songwriter: Peter Wilhousky

"The Battle Hymn of the Republic"
Performed by Frank C. Stanley, Elise Stevenson, and a mixed quartet in 1908

"The Battle Hymn of the Republic"
Modern jazz arrangement by Eric Richards, performed by United States Air Force Band Airmen of Note

- In 1953, Marian Anderson sang the song before a television audience of 60 million persons, broadcast live over the NBC and CBS networks, as part of The Ford 50th Anniversary Show.
- In 1960, the Mormon Tabernacle Choir won the Grammy Award for Best Performance by a Vocal Group or Chorus. The 45 rpm single record, which was arranged and edited by Columbia Records and Cleveland disk jockey Bill Randle, was a commercial success and reached #13 on Billboard's Hot 100 the previous autumn. It is the choir's only Top 40 hit in the Hot 100.
- Judy Garland performed this song on her weekly television show in December 1963. She originally wanted to do a dedication show for President John F. Kennedy upon his assassination, but CBS would not let her, so she performed the song without being able to mention his name.
- On November 22, 1963, the day that President John F. Kennedy was assassinated, the Mormon Tabernacle Choir performed the "Battle Hymn of the Republic" live on national television.
- Andy Williams experienced commercial success in 1968 with an a cappella version recorded at Senator Robert Kennedy's funeral. Backed by the St. Charles Borromeo choir, his version reached #11 on the adult contemporary chart and #33 on the Billboard Hot 100.
- Anita Bryant performed it January 17, 1971, at the halftime show of Super Bowl V. She would also do it again on January 25, 1973, during the burial services for LBJ at his Texas ranch.
- The Morehouse College Glee Club performed it at Former President Jimmy Carter's funeral ceremony at the Carter Center in Atlanta on January 4, 2025.
- In 1985, the hard rock band Stryper released a rock version of this song on their sophomore album, "Soldiers Under Command".

== Influence ==
=== Popularity and widespread use ===
In the years since the Civil War, "The Battle Hymn of the Republic" has been used frequently as an American patriotic song. In June 2026, CBS News included the song in its list of the 250 essential American songs of the past 250 years.

=== Cultural influences ===
The lyrics of "Battle Hymn of the Republic" appear in Dr. Martin Luther King Jr.'s sermons and speeches, most notably in his speech "How Long, Not Long" from the steps of the Alabama State Capitol building on March 25, 1965, after the successful Selma to Montgomery march, and in his final sermon "I've Been to the Mountaintop", delivered in Memphis, Tennessee, on the evening of April 3, 1968, the night before his assassination. The speech ends with the first lyrics of the "Battle Hymn": "Mine eyes have seen the glory of the coming of the Lord."

Bishop Michael B. Curry of North Carolina, after his election as the first African American Presiding Bishop of The Episcopal Church, delivered a sermon to the Church's General Convention on July 3, 2015, in which the lyrics of the "Battle Hymn" framed the message of God's love. After proclaiming "Glory, glory, hallelujah, His truth is marching on", a letter from President Barack Obama was read, congratulating Bishop Curry on his historic election. Curry is known for quoting the "Battle Hymn" during his sermons.

The tune has played a role in many movies where patriotic music has been required, including the 1970 World War II war comedy Kelly's Heroes, and the 1999 sci-fi western Wild Wild West. Words from the first verse gave John Steinbeck's wife Carol Steinbeck the title of his 1939 novel The Grapes of Wrath. The title of John Updike's In the Beauty of the Lilies also came from this song, as did Terrible Swift Sword and Never Call Retreat, two volumes in Bruce Catton's Centennial History of the Civil War. Terrible Swift Sword is also the name of a board wargame simulating the Battle of Gettysburg.

The opening line of the song is referenced in The Smiths' 1983 song "These Things Take Time", where it is quoted as "Mine eyes have seen the glory of the sacred wunderkind".

Words from the second last line of the last verse are paraphrased in Leonard Cohen's song "Steer Your Way". It was originally published as a poem in The New Yorker magazine. "As He died to make men holy, let us die to make men free" becomes "As He died to make men holy, let us die to make things cheap".

=== In association with soccer ===
The refrain "Glory, glory, hallelujah!" has been adopted by fans of a number of sporting teams, most notably in the English and Scottish Premier Leagues. The popular use of the tune by Tottenham Hotspur can be traced to September 1961 during the 1961–62 European Cup. Their first opponents in the competition were the Polish side Górnik Zabrze, and the Polish press described the Spurs team as "no angels" due to their rough tackling. In the return leg at White Hart Lane, some fans then wore angel costumes at the match holding placards with slogans such as "Glory be to shining White Hart Lane", and the crowded started singing the refrain "Glory, glory, hallelujah" as Spurs beat the Poles 8–1, starting the tradition at Tottenham. It was released as the B-side to "Ossie's Dream" for the 1981 FA Cup final.

The theme was then picked up by Hibernian, with Hector Nicol's release of the track "Glory, glory to the Hibees" in 1963. "Glory, Glory Leeds United" was a popular chant during Leeds' 1969–70 FA Cup run all the way to the final. Manchester United fans picked it up as "Glory, Glory Man United" prior to the 1983 FA Cup final.

"We're not Brazil, we're Northern Ireland" is a self-deprecating song popular with fans of the Northern Ireland football team. The words by Stewart McAfee celebrate the team's historic successes ("Mine eyes have seen the glory of España '82"), whilst acknowledging in a witty way that it is not among the giants of world football. A studio recording sung by the team and featuring local broadcasters George Jones and Jackie Fullerton was released in 2006.

As a result of its popularity with these and other British teams, use of the tune has spread internationally and to other sporting codes. An example of its reach is its popularity with fans of the Australian Rugby League team, the South Sydney Rabbitohs (Glory, Glory to South Sydney) and to A-League Men team Perth Glory. Brighton fans celebrate their 1970s legend by singing "Mine eyes have seen the glory of the coming of the Lord, he played for Brighton and Hove Albion and his name is Peter Ward".

=== Other songs set to this tune ===
Some songs make use of both the melody and elements of the lyrics of "Battle Hymn of the Republic", either in tribute or as a parody:

- "Marching Song of the First Arkansas" is a Civil War–era song that has a similar lyrical structure to "Battle Hymn of the Republic". It has been described as "a powerful early statement of black pride, militancy, and desire for full equality, revealing the aspirations of black soldiers for Reconstruction as well as anticipating the spirit of the civil rights movement of the 1960s".
- In another Civil War–era version of the Battle Hymn, the 1st German Rifles, mostly Forty-eighters (48ers) from New York fighting under Louis Blenker as Blenker's Division, sang (translated) "We are Germans and we're fighting for the freedom of the Union, with firm belief in unity just like in '48", referring to the Revolutions of 1848 in German states after which they emigrated to the US. This version is also used by reenactors of the 17th Missouri Infantry Regiment Turners.
- The tune has been used with alternative lyrics numerous times. The University of Georgia's rally song, "Glory Glory to Old Georgia", is based on the patriotic tune, and has been sung at American college football games since 1909. Other college teams also use songs set to the same tune. One such is "Glory, Glory to Old Auburn" at Auburn University. Another is "Glory Colorado", traditionally played by the band and sung after touchdowns scored by the Colorado Buffaloes. "Glory Colorado" has been a fight song at the University of Colorado (Boulder) for more than one hundred years.
- In 1901 Mark Twain wrote "The Battle Hymn of the Republic, Updated", with the same tune as the original, as a comment on the Philippine–American War. It was later recorded by the Chad Mitchell Trio.
- A schoolyard parody of the song beginning with, "Mine eyes have seen the glory of the burning of the school" emerged in the late 1950s. In the early 1960s, a chorus beginning with, "Glory, glory, hallelujah! Teacher hit me with a ruler!" was added. There are many variations of the lyrics. Folk musician Tom Glazer recorded a variation of this song, titled "Battle Hymn of the Children," which was released on his 1963 LP On Top of Spaghetti. The parody became less popular after the 1999 Columbine High School massacre due to its violent lyrics.
- The United States Army paratrooper song, "Blood on the Risers", first sung in World War II, includes the lyrics "Gory, gory" in the lyrics, based on the original's "Glory, glory".
- Folk singer and civil rights activist Len Chandler wrote "Move On Over," and performed it with Pete Seeger on episode 22 of Rainbow Quest.
- A number of terrace songs (in association football) are sung to the tune in Britain. Most frequently, fans chant "Glory, Glory..." plus their team's name: the chants have been recorded and released officially as songs by Hibernian, Tottenham, Leeds United and Manchester United. The 1994 World Cup official song "Gloryland" interpreted by Daryl Hall and the Sounds of Blackness has the tune of "Battle Hymn of the Republic". In Argentina the St. Alban's former Pupils Assn (Old Philomathian Club) used the tune for its "Glory Glory Philomathians" as well. While not heard often nowadays it is still a cherished song for the Old Philomathians.
- In Australia, the song is used by rugby league club the South Sydney Rabbitohs—"Glory Glory to South Sydney". Each verse ends with, "They wear the Red and Green".
- The parody song "Jesus Can't Play Rugby", popular at informal sporting events, uses the traditional melody under improvised lyrics. Performances typically feature a call-and-response structure, wherein one performer proposes an amusing reason why Jesus Christ might be disqualified from playing rugby—e.g. "Jesus can't play rugby 'cause his dad will rig the game"—which is then repeated back by other participants (mirroring the repetitive structure of "John Brown's Body"), before ending with the tongue-in-cheek proclamation "Jesus saves, Jesus saves, Jesus saves". A chorus may feature the repeated call of "Free beer for all the ruggers", or, after concluding the final verse, "Jesus, we're only kidding".
  - A variant of this version is popular at Hash House Harrier events, proposing reasons why Jesus might be disqualified from running a hash trail—e.g. "Jesus can't go Hashing 'cause the flour falls through his hands" or "Jesus can't go Hashing 'cause he turns the beer to wine". The chorus is similarly changed to "Free beer for all the Hashers", and finally "Jesus, we're only kidding".
- A protest song titled "Gloria, Gloria Labandera" (lit. "Gloria the Washerwoman") was used by supporters of former Philippine president Joseph Estrada to mock Gloria Macapagal Arroyo after the latter assumed the presidency following Estrada's 2001 ouster from office. The "labandera" imagery was both a jab at her paternal grandmother washing clothes for extra income, and a reference to her own alleged money laundering. Arroyo took the nickname in stride and went on to use it for her projects, though the Catholic Church took offence at the parody and called it "obscene".
- The song "The White Man Marches On" is a rendition using the same melody. This version contains explicit racist and antisemitic lyrics. It is famously known for having been used in a scene of the 1998 film American History X.
- Former Christian singer Audrey Assad recorded a rewritten version in 2019 called "Your Peace Will Make Us One", keeping the religious themes but removing the violent references.

In 1966 the italian trio-band Los Marcellos Ferial played the song John Brown, in Italian with some little differences.

- Quaker historian Margaret Hope Bacon wrote a version in honor of Quaker activist Lucretia Mott, in which the chorus is replaced with "Thank thee kindly, friend Lucretia... her light still shines for me!" These lyrics are published in the songbook Rise Up Singing! and the Quaker hymnal Worship in Song.
- The song "Mingle, Mingle, Hallelujah" uses the same tune.
- In 2026, Afroman published a rendition titled "BATTERAM HYMN OF THE POLICE WHISTLE BLOWER" in response to the start of the defamation trial brought against him by seven Adams County police officers.

Other songs simply use the melody, i.e. the melody of "John Brown's Body", with no lyrical connection to "The Battle Hymn of the Republic":

- "Solidarity Forever", a marching song for organized labor in the 20th century.
- The anthem of the American consumers' cooperative movement, "The Battle Hymn of Cooperation", written in 1932.
- The tune has been used as a marching song in the Finnish military with the words "Kalle-Kustaan muori makaa hiljaa haudassaan, ja yli haudan me marssimme näin" ("Carl Gustaf's hag lies silently in her grave, and we're marching over the grave like this").
- The Finnish Ice Hockey fans can be heard singing the tune with the lyrics "Suomi tekee kohta maalin, eikä kukaan sille mitään voi" ("Finland will soon score, and no one can do anything about it").
- The Estonian song "Kalle Kusta" uses the melody as well.
- The Swedish drinking song Halta Lotta (lit. "Limping Lotta")—referring to a pub in Gothenburg—uses the melody. The song tells how much a drink is worth at the pub in question (either 8 or 15 öre, depending on the version), how one can pay with kisses if one cannot afford a drink, how the recipient of these kisses is the landlady's sister given that the landlady is dead, where the landlady is buried and how her grave is desecrated by urinating dogs and how her body decays, eventually leading to the nationalization of the pub, which drives the prices up to 50 öre.
- The folk dance "Gólya" ("Stork"), known in several Hungarian-speaking communities in Transylvania (Romania), as well as in Hungary proper, is set to the same tune. The same dance is found among the Csángós of Moldavia with a different tune, under the name "Hojna"; with the Moldavian melody generally considered original, and the "Battle Hymn" tune a later adaptation.
- The melody is used in French Canadian Christmas carol called "Glory, Alleluia", covered by Celine Dion and others.
- The melody is used in the marching song of the Assam Regiment of the Indian Army: "Badluram Ka Badan", or "Badluram's Body", its chorus being "Shabash Hallelujah" instead of "Glory Hallelujah". The word "Shabash" in Hindustani means "congratulations" or "well done".
- The song "Belfast Brigade" using alternate lyrics is sung by the Lucky4 in support of the Irish Republican Army.
- The song "Up Went Nelson", celebrating the destruction of Nelson's Pillar in Dublin, is sung to this tune.
- The Discordian Handbook Principia Discordia has a version of the song called Battle Hymn of the Eristocracy. It has been recorded for example by Aarni.
- The Subiaco Football Club, in the West Australian Football League, uses the song for their team song. Also, the Casey Demons in the Victorian Football League also currently use the song. The words have been adjusted due to the song mainly being written during the period of time they were called the Casey Scorpions and the Springvale Football Club. As well as these two clubs, the West Torrens Football Club used the song until 1990, when their successor club, Woodville-West Torrens, currently use this song in the South Australian National Football League. The Broadbeach Cats also employ this melody for their theme song. Clarence Kangaroos and Wanderer Eagles use this as well.
- The Brisbane Bears, before they merged with the Fitzroy Football Club, used the "Battle Hymn of the Republic" in experiment mode before eventually scrapping it in favour of the original song.
- The melody is used in the well-known Dutch children's song "Lief klein konijntje". The song is about a cute little rabbit that has a fly on his nose. The British adaptation of the lyrics is thought to be "Little Peter Rabbit".
- The melody is used as the theme for the Japanese electronics chain Yodobashi Camera.
- The melody is used in several Japanese nursery rhymes, including Tomodachi Sanka (ともだち讃歌, "Hymn to Friendship") and Gonbe-san no aka-chan (ごんべさんの赤ちゃん, "Mr. Gonbei's baby"), which roughly corresponds to the "John Brown's baby has a cold upon his chest" version of "John Brown's Body".
- The melody has been used as a fight song in Queen's University, named "Oil Thigh".
- The melody is used as Christmas carols in Indonesia, named "Nunga Jumpang Muse Ari Pesta I" in Batak Toba language, "Sendah Jumpa Kita Wari Raya E" in Karo language and "Sudah Tiba Hari Raya Yang Kudus" in Indonesian (all three translate as "Christmas Day is Coming").
- The melody is used in "Hãy tiếp tục đoàn kết với Việt Nam" (Let's continue to unite with Vietnam), a song about the Sino-Vietnamese war of 1979.
- The melody is used in "Godiva's Hymn", a traditional drinking song for North American engineers.
- In 1970, folk/pop singer Melanie used the melody for a hit single, "Psychotherapy", on her live concert album Leftover Wine.
- The melody is used as the prominent theme in Mickey Newbury's 1972 song "An American Trilogy", a patriotic medley popularized by Elvis Presley. The song was often used as a showstopper for Presley's concerts.
- The melody is used for the humorous song "Don't Sit on the Afikomen", often sung at the Passover Seder.

=== Other settings of the text ===
Irish composer Ina Boyle set the text for solo soprano, mixed choir and orchestra; she completed her version in 1918. The British Methodist Hymn Book used in the mid-20th century had Walford Davies's "Vision" as the first tune, and the "Battle Hymn" as the second tune.

The progressive metal band Dream Theater utilise the lyrics of the "Battle Hymn of the Republic" at the end of their song "In the Name of God", the final song on their 2003 album Train of Thought.

== See also ==
- "Battle Cry of Freedom"
- "Belfast Brigade"
- "Blood on the Risers"
- Children's street culture
- "Glory, Glory" (Georgia fight song)
- "Over There"
- "Solidarity Forever"
- William Weston Patton
- "Dixie", the Confederate equivalent.
