= John Brown's Body =

United States marching song

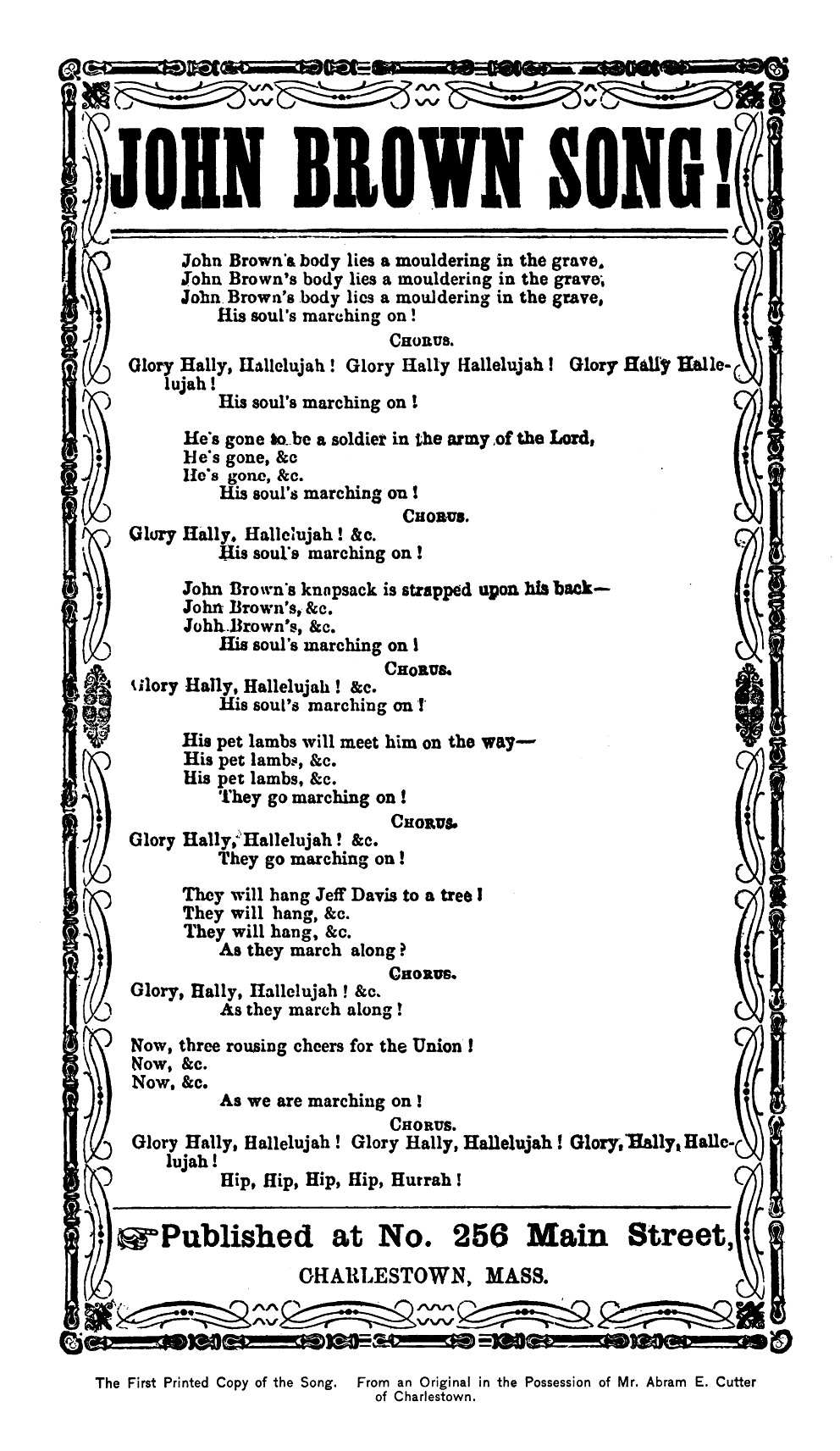
- Original publication of the text of the "John Brown Song" in 1861
- Lyrics: James E. Greenleaf, C. S. Hall, C. B. Marsh, and others, 1861
- Music: American folk song, 1856

Audio sample
- 1902 sound recording by J. W. Myers of John Brown's Body: file; help

"John Brown's Body" (Roud 771), originally known as "John Brown's Song", is a United States marching song about the abolitionist John Brown. The song was popular in the Union during the American Civil War. The song arose out of the folk hymn tradition of the American camp meeting movement of the late 18th and early 19th century. According to an 1889 account, the original John Brown lyrics were a collective effort by a group of Union soldiers who were referring both to the famous John Brown and also, humorously, to a Sergeant John Brown of their own battalion. Various other authors have published additional verses or claimed credit for originating the John Brown lyrics and tune.

The "flavor of coarseness, possibly of irreverence" led many of the era to feel uncomfortable with the earliest "John Brown" lyrics. This in turn led to the creation of many variant versions of the text that aspired to a higher literary quality. The most famous of these is Julia Ward Howe's "Battle Hymn of the Republic", which was written when a friend suggested, "Why do you not write some good words for that stirring tune?" Kimball suggests that President Abraham Lincoln made this suggestion to Howe.

Numerous informal versions and adaptations of the lyrics and music have been created from the mid-1800s to the present, making "John Brown's Body" an example of a living folk music tradition.

== History of the tune ==
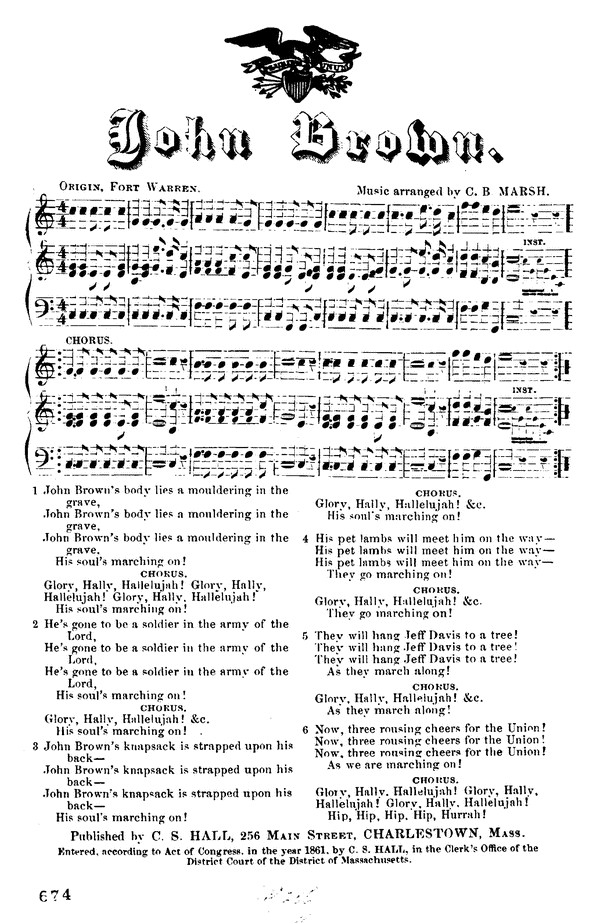
According to George Kimball, the second publication of the John Brown Song and the first including both music and text, with music arranged by C.S. Marsh, dated 1861. See George Kimball, "Origin of the John Brown Song", New England Magazine, new series 1 (1890):371–376

"Say, Brothers, Will You Meet Us", the tune that eventually became associated with "John Brown's Body" and the "Battle Hymn of the Republic", was formed in the American camp meeting circuit of the late 18th century and the 19th century. These meetings were usually held in frontier areas, when people who lacked regular access to church services would gather together to worship before traveling preachers. These meetings were important social events, but developed a reputation for wildness in addition to wild religious fervor experienced by attendees. In that atmosphere, where hymns were taught and learned by rote and a spontaneous and improvisational element was prized, both tunes and words changed and adapted in true folk music fashion:

Specialists in nineteenth-century American religious history describe camp meeting music as the creative product of participants who, when seized by the spirit of a particular sermon or prayer, would take lines from a preacher's text as a point of departure for a short, simple melody. The melody was either borrowed from a preexisting tune or made up on the spot. The line would be sung repeatedly, changing slightly each time, and shaped gradually into a stanza that could be learned easily by others and memorized quickly.

Early versions of "Say, Brothers" included variants, developed as part of this call-and-response hymn singing tradition such as:

Oh! Brothers will you meet me
Oh! Sisters will you meet me
Oh! Mourners will you meet me
Oh! Sinners will you meet me
Oh! Christians will you meet me

This initial line was repeated three times and finished with the tag "On Canaan's happy shore".

The first choruses included lines such as

We'll shout and give him glory (3×)
For glory is his own

The familiar "Glory, glory, hallelujah" chorus—a notable feature of the "John Brown Song", the "Battle Hymn of the Republic", and many other texts that used this tune—developed out of the oral camp meeting tradition sometime between 1808 and the 1850s.

Folk hymns like "Say, Brothers" circulated and evolved chiefly through oral tradition rather than through print. In print, the camp meeting song can be traced back as early as 1806–1808, when it was published in camp meeting song collections in South Carolina, Virginia, and Massachusetts.

The tune and variants of the "Say, brothers" hymn text were popular in southern camp meetings, with both African-American and white worshipers, throughout the early 1800s, spread predominantly through Methodist and Baptist camp meeting circuits. As the southern camp meeting circuit died down in the mid-1800s, the "Say, brothers" tune was incorporated into hymn and tune books and it was via this route that the tune became well known in the mid-1800s throughout the northern U.S. By 1861, "groups as disparate as Baptists, Mormons, Millerites, the American Sunday School Union, and the Sons of Temperance all claimed 'Say Brothers' as their own."

For example, in 1858 words and the tune were published in The Union Harp and Revival Chorister, selected and arranged by Charles Dunbar, and published in Cincinnati. The book contains the words and music of a song "My Brother Will You Meet Me", with the music but not the words of the "Glory Hallelujah" chorus; and the opening line "Say my brother will you meet me". In December 1858 a Brooklyn Sunday school published a hymn called "Brothers, Will You Meet Us" with the words and music of the "Glory Hallelujah" chorus, and the opening line "Say, brothers will you meet us".

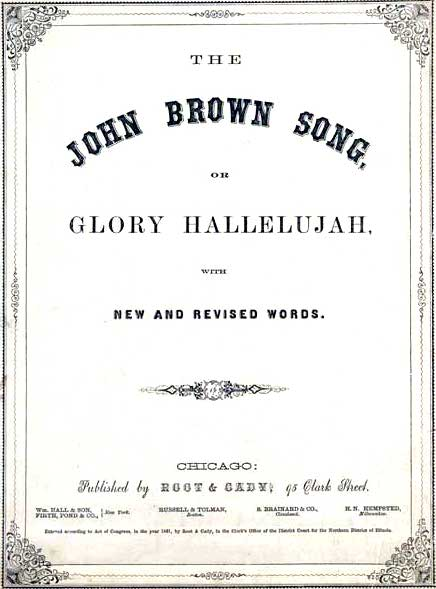
Cover of an 1861 sheet music score for "John Brown's Song"

Some researchers have maintained that the tune's roots go back to a "Negro folk song", an African-American wedding song from Georgia, or to a British sea shanty that originated as a Swedish drinking song. Anecdotes indicate that versions of "Say, Brothers" were sung as part of African American ring shouts; appearance of the hymn in this call-and-response setting with singing, clapping, stomping, dancing, and extended ecstatic choruses may have given impetus to the development of the well known "Glory hallelujah" chorus. Given that the tune was developed in an oral tradition, it is impossible to say for certain which of these influences may have played a specific role in the creation of this tune, but it is certain that numerous folk influences from different cultures such as these were prominent in the musical culture of the camp meeting, and that such influences were freely combined in the music-making that took place in the revival movement.

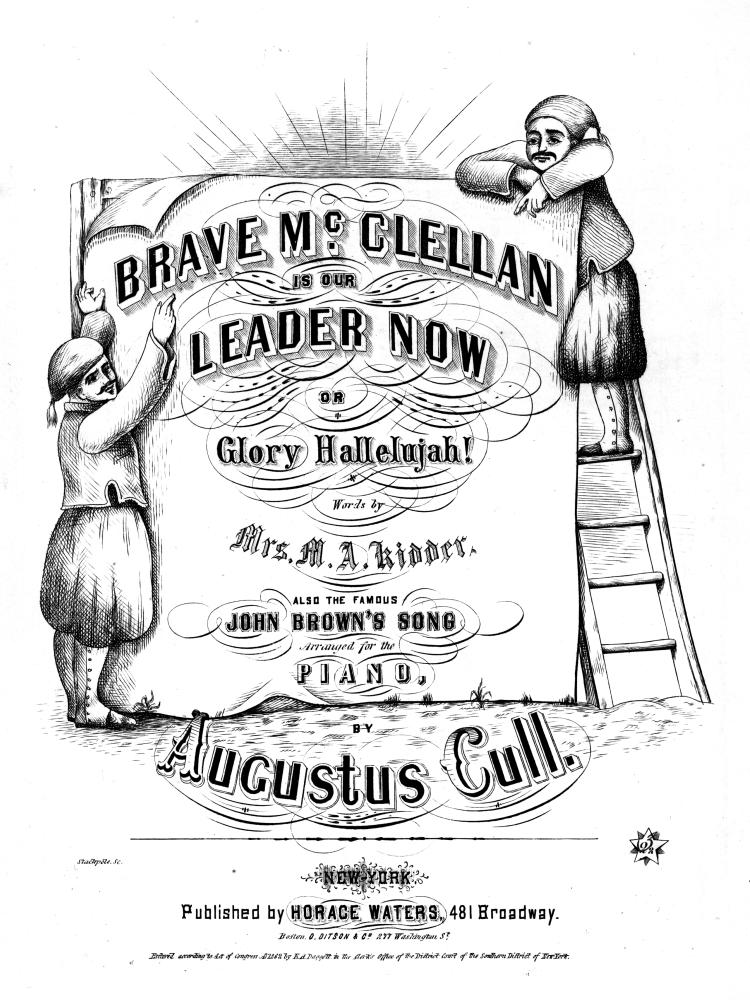
Sheet music for "Brave McClellan is Our Leader Now", with words by Mrs. M.A. Kidder, set to the Glory Hallelujah tune and also including "the famous John Brown's song", 1862

It has been suggested that "Say Brothers, Will You Meet Us", popular among Southern blacks, already had an anti-slavery sub-text, with its reference to "Canaan's happy shore" alluding to the idea of crossing the river to a happier place. If so, that subtext was considerably enhanced and expanded as the various "John Brown" lyrics took on themes related to the famous abolitionist and the American Civil War.

== Use of the song during the Civil War ==
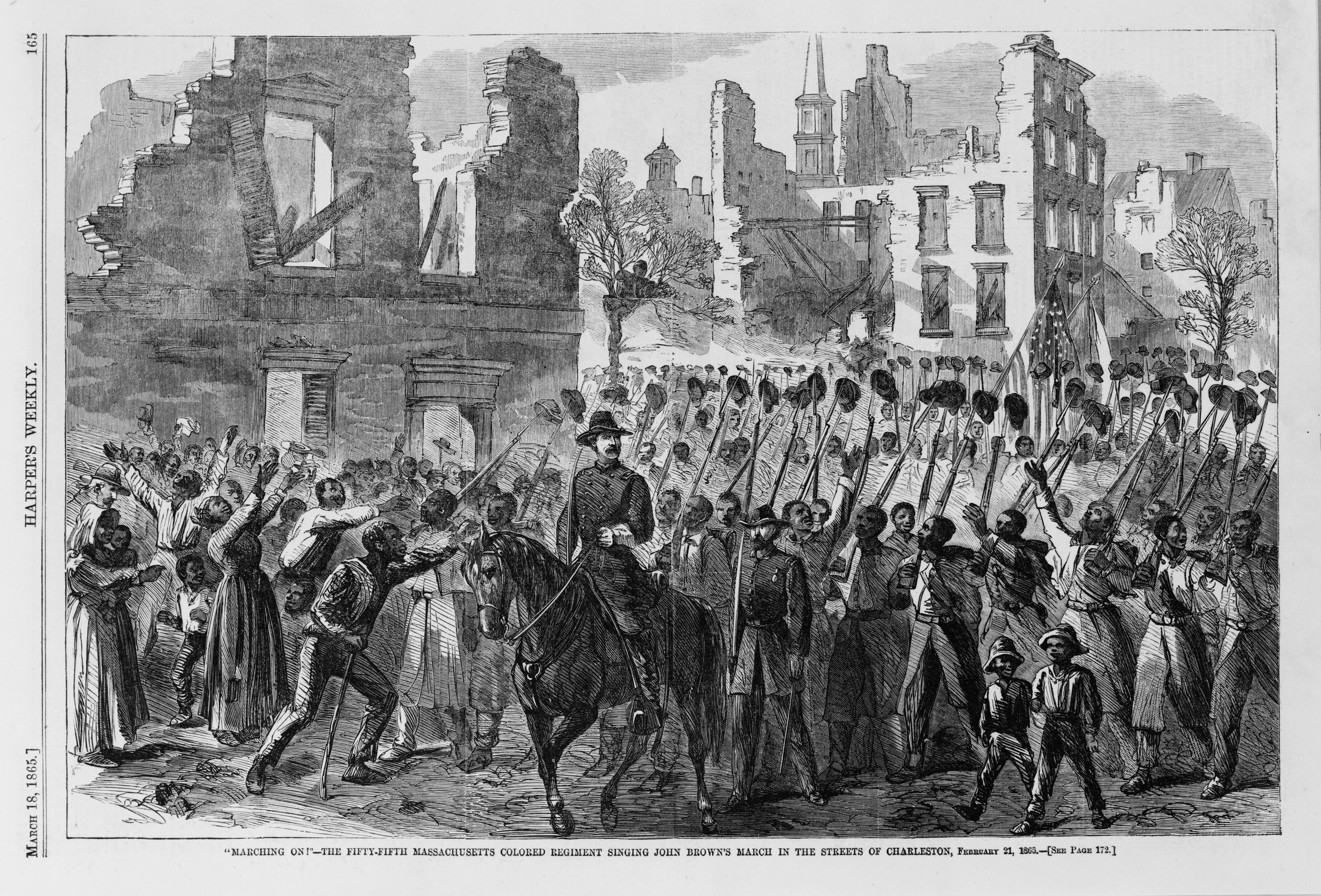
Black soldiers, led by white officers, singing "John Brown's Body" as they march into Charleston, South Carolina, in February 1865

In 1861, the new 29th New York Infantry Regiment was stationed in Charles Town, Virginia (since 1863, West Virginia), where John Brown was executed. The contemporary abolitionist newspaper The Liberator wrote that hundreds of soldiers from the unit would visit the site of John Brown's hanging daily, and sing a refrain that went:

May heaven's smiles look kindly down
Upon the grave of old John Brown.

Brown's friend and admirer Frederick Douglass wrote in an 1874 newspaper piece:

He [John Brown] was with the troops during that war, he was seen in every camp fire, and our boys pressed onward to victory and freedom, timing their feet to the stately stepping of Old John Brown as his soul went marching on.

At Andersonville Prison, which held Union prisoners of war, a visiting Confederate soldier describes it thus:

I declined an invitation not very heartily given, as I thought, to go within the stockade, but climbed up to the sentry-walk and looked over. I cannot tell the horror of that scene. It was almost sundown of a hot autumn day. The wretchedness depicted in the faces of that squalid, unprotected multitude was unspeakable. I could hear the soughing of the winds in the pines beyond, but they had neither breath nor shade. The stench even where I stood was sickening. Because I had been a prisoner myself I no doubt pitied them the more. I guessed what they must endure, though I only dimly imagined the horrors of their fate. As I turned away the notes of song arose from the squalid mass. I paused and listened—listened to the very end of that most remarkable paean of self-sacrifice that ever inspired an army or a people to suffer and achieve for another's sake. When I went away in the gloaming that follows quick upon our sunset, the words went with me, and have never left my memory.

In the beauty of the lilies Christ was born across the sea
With a glory in His bosom that transfigures you and me;
As He died to make men holy, let us die to make men free.

There is an anthem that swallows up in moral grandeur all the songs of patriotic purport from Miriam's time till now. It marks the climax of human devotion. 'Perhaps for a good man some would even dare to die,' is the extreme limit of the apostle's idea of merely human self-sacrifice. But out of that sweltering, fetid prison-pen into the silent night came the excellent chorus of hundreds who stood in the very presence of a lingering and terrible death. 'As He died to make men holy, let us die to make men free!'

== Use elsewhere ==
On May 1, 1865, in Charleston, South Carolina, recently freed African-Americans and some white missionaries held a parade of 10,000 people, led by 3,000 Black children singing "John Brown's Body". The march honored 257 dead Union soldiers whose remains the organizers had re-buried from a mass grave in a Confederate prison camp. This is considered the first observation of Decoration Day, now known as Memorial Day.

The American consul in Vladivostok, Russia, Richard T. Greener, reported in 1906 that Russian soldiers were singing the song. The context was the 1905 Russian Revolution.

"John Brown's Body" was sung by British socialists in the mid-20th century. It was, for example, a familiar tune to the citizens of Crewe at Labour Party rallies during the 1945 General Election, the lyrics being better known than those of The Red Flag, the Labour Party's own official anthem. Elements of the tune were integrated into the Königgrätz March 1866 by Johann Gottfried Piefke.

== History of the text of "John Brown's Body" ==
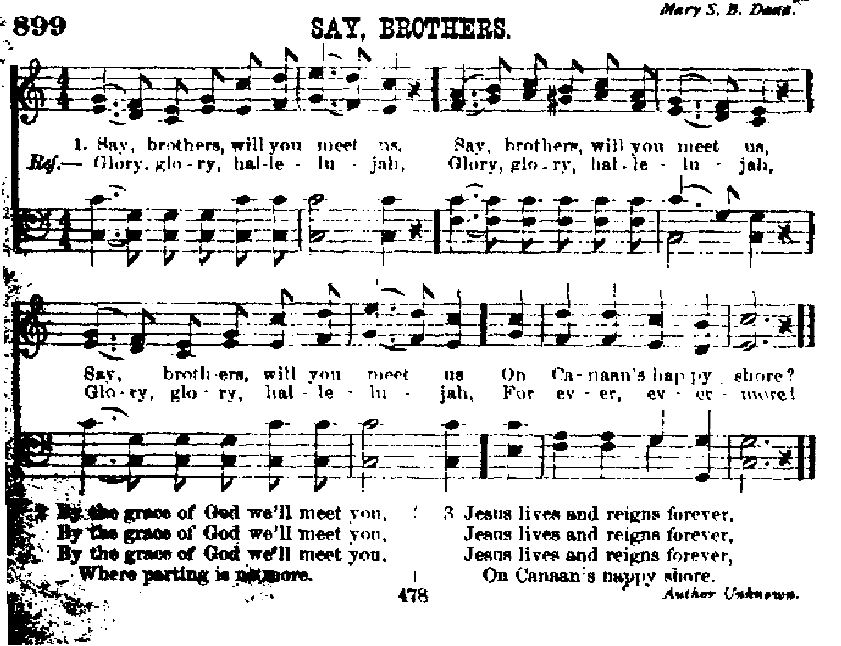
"Say, Brothers" from Hymn and Tune Book of the Methodist Episcopal Church, South, Round Note Edition, Nashville, TN (1889, reprinted 1903). N.B. The name Mary S. B. Dana refers to the author of Hymn No. 898, not shown, which was the previous hymn in this collection.

=== First public performance ===
At a flag-raising ceremony at Fort Warren, near Boston, on Sunday May 12, 1861, the "John Brown" song was publicly played "perhaps for the first time". The American Civil War had begun the previous month.

Newspapers reported troops singing the song as they marched in the streets of Boston on July 18, 1861, and there was a "rash" of broadside printings of the song with substantially the same words as the undated "John Brown Song!" broadside, stated by Kimball to be the first published edition, and the broadside with music by C. S. Marsh copyrighted on July 16, 1861, also published by C.S. Hall (see images displayed on this page). Other publishers also came out with versions of the "John Brown Song" and claimed copyright.

=== "Tiger" Battalion writes the lyrics; Kimball's account ===
In 1890, George Kimball wrote his account of how the 2nd Infantry Battalion of the Massachusetts militia, known as the "Tiger" Battalion, collectively worked out the lyrics to "John Brown's Body". Kimball wrote:

We had a jovial Scotchman in the battalion, named John Brown ... and as he happened to bear the identical name of the old hero of Harper's Ferry, he became at once the butt of his comrades. If he made his appearance a few minutes late among the working squad, or was a little tardy in falling into the company line, he was sure to be greeted with such expressions as "Come, old fellow, you ought to be at it if you are going to help us free the slaves"; or, "This can't be John Brown—why, John Brown is dead." And then some wag would add, in a solemn, drawling tone, as if it were his purpose to give particular emphasis to the fact that John Brown was really, actually dead: "Yes, yes, poor old John Brown is dead; his body lies mouldering in the grave."

According to Kimball, these sayings became bywords among the soldiers and, in a communal effort—similar in many ways to the spontaneous composition of camp meeting songs described above—were gradually put to the tune of "Say, Brothers":

Finally ditties composed of the most nonsensical, doggerel rhymes, setting for the fact that John Brown was dead and that his body was undergoing the process of dissolution, began to be sung to the music of the hymn above given. These ditties underwent various ramifications, until eventually the lines were reached,—

John Brown's body lies a-mouldering in the grave,
His soul's marching on.

And,—

He's gone to be a soldier in the army of the Lord,
His soul's marching on.

These lines seemed to give general satisfaction, the idea that Brown's soul was "marching on" receiving recognition at once as having a germ of inspiration in it. They were sung over and over again with a great deal of gusto, the "Glory hallelujah" chorus being always added.

Some leaders of the battalion, feeling the words were coarse and irreverent, tried to urge the adoption of more fitting lyrics, but to no avail. The lyrics were soon prepared for publication by members of the battalion, together with publisher C. S. Hall. They selected and polished verses they felt appropriate, and may even have enlisted the services of a local poet to help polish and create verses.

The official histories of the old First Artillery and of the 55th Artillery (1918) also record the Tiger Battalion's role in creating the John Brown Song, confirming the general thrust of Kimball's version with a few additional details.

=== Other claims of authorship ===
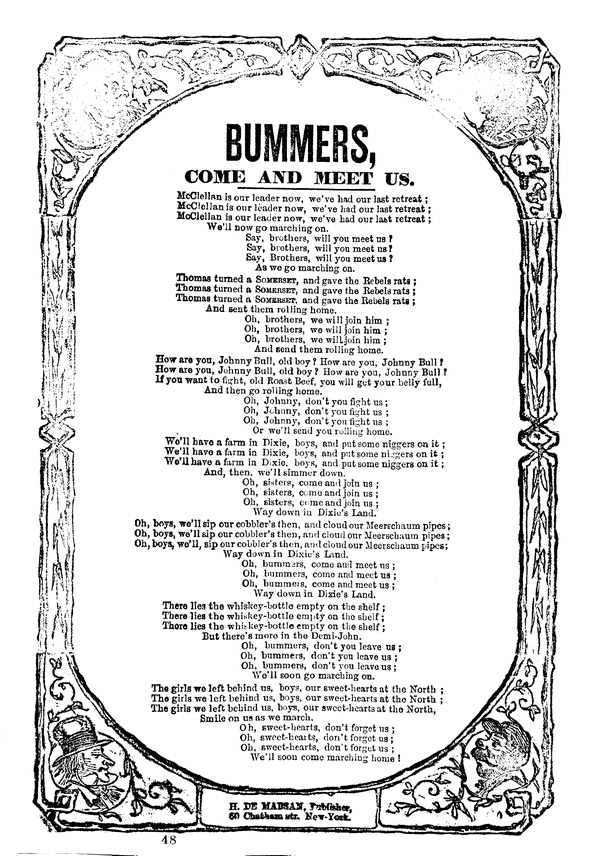
Bummers, Come and Meet Us, published in New York, H. De Marsan, no date. This version of the text shares many elements with "Say, Brothers" and "Brave McClellan is Our Leader" but few, or even none, with the "John Brown Song".

==== William Steffe ====
In hymnals and folks song collections, the hymn tune for "Say, Brothers" is often attributed to William Steffe. Robert W. Allen summarizes Steffe's own story of composing the tune:

Steffe finally told the whole story of the writing of the song. He was asked to write it in 1855 or 56 for the Good Will Engine Company of Philadelphia. They used it as a song of welcome for the visiting Liberty Fire Company of Baltimore. The original verse for the song was "Say, Bummers, Will You Meet Us?" Someone else converted the "Say, Bummers" verse into the hymn "Say, Brothers, Will You Meet Us". He thought he might be able to identify that person, but was never able to do so.

Though Steffe may have played a role in creating the "Say, Bummers" version of the song, which seems to be a variant of and owe a debt to both "Say, Brothers" and "John Brown", Steffe could not have written the "Glory Hallelujah" tune or the "Say, Brothers" text, both of which had been circulating for decades before his birth.

==== Thomas Brigham Bishop ====
Maine songwriter, musician, band leader, and Union soldier Thomas Brigham Bishop (1835–1905) has also been credited as the originator of the John Brown Song, notably by promoter James MacIntyre in a 1916 book and 1935 interview. (Bishop also claimed to have written "Kitty Wells", "Shoo, Fly Don't Bother Me", and "When Johnny Comes Marching Home", and to have played a role in the composition of "Swanee River".)

==== Other claimants ====
In the late 1800s, during the song's height of popularity, a number of other authors claimed to have played a part in the origin of the song. Some sources list Steffe, Bishop, Frank E. Jerome, and others as the tune's composer. Given the tune's use in the camp meeting circuits in the late 1700s and early 1800s and the first known publication dates of 1806–1808, long before most of these claimants were born, it is apparent that none of these authors composed the tune that was the basis of "Say, Brothers" and "John Brown".

As Annie J. Randall wrote, "Multiple authors, most of them anonymous, borrowed the tune from Say, Brothers, gave it new texts, and used it to hail Brown's war to abolish the centuries old practice of slavery in America." This continual re-use and adaptation of existing words and tunes is a crucial feature of the oral folk music tradition that "Say, Brothers" and the "John Brown Song" were embedded in. Some of those who claimed to have composed the tune may have had a hand in creating and publishing some of the legitimate variants or alternate texts that used the tune—but all certainly wanted a share of the fame that came with being known as the author of this very well known tune.

=== Creation of other versions ===
Once "John Brown's Body" became popular as a marching song, more literary versions of the "John Brown" lyrics were created for the "John Brown" tune. For example, William Weston Patton wrote his influential version in October 1861, which was published in the Chicago Tribune, December 16 of that year. The "Song of the First of Arkansas" was written, or written down, by Capt. Lindley Miller in 1864, although (typical of the confusion of authorship among the variants and versions) a similar text with the title "The Valiant Soldiers" is also attributed to Sojourner Truth. "The President's Proclamation" was written by Edna Dean Proctor in 1863 on the occasion of the Emancipation Proclamation. Other versions include the "Marching song of the 4th Battalion of Rifles, 13th Reg., Massachusetts Volunteers" and the "Kriegslied der Division Blenker", written for the Blenker Division, a group of German soldiers who had participated in the European revolutions of 1848/49 and fought for the Union in the American Civil War.

The song was recorded with Italian lyrics by Gino Negri and by Milva on her 1965 album Canti della libertà; the following year Bobby Solo recorded it in its original language on the LP Canzoni e storie del west. Also in 1966 the Los Marcellos Ferial recorded it in Italian on the 45 rpm John Brown/Cavalca cowboy, with different lyrics from Gino Negri's, written by Marcello Minerbi and Tullio Romano. The Italian version "John Brown giace nella tomba là nel pian" is traditionally sung by Italian boy scouts.

== Other related texts ==
The tune was later also used for "The Battle Hymn of the Republic" (written in November 1861, published in February 1862; this song was directly inspired by "John Brown's Body"), "Marching Song of the First Arkansas", "The Battle Hymn of Cooperation", "Bummers, Come and Meet Us" (see facsimile), and many other related texts and parodies during and immediately after the American Civil War period.

The World War II American paratrooper song "Blood on the Risers" is set to the tune, and includes the chorus "Glory, glory (or Gory, gory), what a hell of a way to die/And he ain't gonna jump no more!" It has since also been adapted to civilian skydiving.

The tune was used for perhaps the most well-known labor-union song in the United States, "Solidarity Forever". The song became an anthem of the Industrial Workers of the World and all unions that sought more than workplace concessions, but a world run by those who labor.

Sailors are known to have adapted "John Brown's Body" into a sea shanty—specifically, into a "Capstan Shanty", used during anchor-raising.

The "John Brown" tune has proven popular for folk-created texts, with many irreverent versions created over the years. "The Burning of the School" is a well-known parody sung by schoolchildren, and another version that begins "John Brown's baby has a cold upon his chest" is often sung by children at summer camps. The same tune is also used for a children's song that begins "Peter Rabbit had a fly upon his nose", inspired by Beatrix Potter's fictional animal character.

An African-American version was recorded as "We'll hang Jeff Davis from a sour apple tree". Similarly, a fight song at the University of Pennsylvania set to the same melody begins, "Hang Jeff Davis from a sour apple tree".

As a common soccer chant, it is generally called "Glory Glory". The famous German children's song "Alle Kinder lernen lesen" ("All the children are learning how to read") is also based on this melody.

A version of the song was also sung by French paratroopers: "oui nous irons tous nous faire casser la gueule en coeur / mais nous reviendrons vainqueurs" meaning "yes, we'll all get our skulls broken, with gusto / but we'll come back victorious".

In Sri Lanka it was adapted into a bilingual (English and Sinhala) song sung at cricket matches—notably at the Royal-Thomian, with the lyrics "We'll hang all the Thomians on the cadju-puhulang tree". Another adaptation sung at the annual match between the Colombo Law and Medical colleges went "Liquor arsenalis and the cannabis indica". This was adapted into a trilingual song by Sooty Banda.

The Assam Regiment of the Indian Army also uses the tune and a modified refrain in its song, "Badluram Ka Badan", based on the Japanese Invasion of Burma and Northeast India during the Second World War.

The music is used for a German-language children's song by Frank und seine Freunde called "Alle Kinder lernen lesen" translated to "All Children Learn to Read".

Len Chandler sang a song called "Move on over" to the tune on Pete Seeger's Rainbow Quest TV show.

== Lyrics ==
The lyrics used with the "John Brown" tune generally increase in complexity and syllable count as they move from a simple, orally transmitted camp meeting song to an orally composed marching song to more consciously literary versions.

The increasing syllable count led to an ever-increasing number of dotted rhythms in the melody to accommodate the increased number of syllables. The result is that the verse and chorus, which were musically identical in "Say, Brothers", became quite distinct rhythmically—though still identical in melodic profile—in "John Brown's Body".

The trend towards ever more elaborate rhythmic variations of the original melody became even more pronounced in the later versions of the "John Brown Song" and in the "Battle Hymn of the Republic", which have far more words and syllables per verse than the early versions. The extra words and syllables are fit in by adding more dotted rhythms to the melody and by including four separate lines in each verse rather than repeating the first line three times. The result is that in these later versions the verse and the chorus became even more distinct rhythmically and poetically though still remaining identical in their underlying melodic profile.

=== "Say, Brothers" ===
(1st verse)
Say, brothers, will you meet us (3×)
On Canaan's happy shore.

(Refrain)
Glory, glory, hallelujah (3×)
For ever, evermore!

(2nd verse)
By the grace of God we'll meet you (3×)
Where parting is no more.

(3rd verse)
Jesus lives and reigns forever (3×)
On Canaan's happy shore.

=== "John Brown's Body" (a number of versions closely similar to this published in 1861) ===
John Brown's body lies a-mouldering in the grave; (3×)
His soul is marching on!

(Chorus)
Glory, glory, hallelujah! Glory, glory, hallelujah!
Glory, glory, hallelujah! his soul is marching on!

He's gone to be a soldier in the army of the Lord! (3×)
His soul is marching on!

(Chorus)

John Brown's knapsack is strapped upon his back! (3×)
His soul is marching on!

(Chorus)

His pet lambs will meet him on the way; (3×)
They go marching on!

(Chorus)

They will hang Jeff Davis to a sour apple tree! (3×)
As they march along!

(Chorus)

Now, three rousing cheers for the Union; (3×)
As we are marching on!

— From the Library of Congress:

==== Version of William Weston Patton ====
William Weston Patton, an influential abolitionist and pastor, composed his "The New John Brown Song" in the fall of 1861 and published it in the Chicago Tribune, December 16, 1861:

Old John Brown's body lies a moldering in the grave,
While weep the sons of bondage whom he ventured all to save;
But though he sleeps his life was lost while struggling for the slave,
His soul is marching on.

Glory Hallelujah!

John Brown was a hero, undaunted, true and brave,
And Kansas knew his valor when he fought her rights to save;
And now, though the grass grows green above his grave,
His soul is marching on.

(Chorus)

He captured Harper's Ferry, with his nineteen men so few,
And frightened "Old Virginny" till she trembled through and through
They hung him for a traitor, themselves a traitor crew,
But his soul is marching on.

(Chorus)

John Brown was John the Baptist of the Christ we are to see—
Christ who of the bondmen shall the Liberator be,
And soon throughout the Sunny South the slaves shall all be free,
For his soul is marching on.

(Chorus)

The conflict that he heralded he looks from heaven to view,
On the army of the Union with its flag red, white and blue.
And heaven shall ring with anthems o'er the deed they mean to do,
For his soul is marching on.

(Chorus)

Ye soldiers of Freedom, then strike, while strike ye may,
The death blow of oppression in a better time and way,
For the dawn of old John Brown has brightened into day,
And his soul is marching on.

(Chorus)

==== Version of Pete Seeger ====
Pete Seeger, an American folk musician, recorded a version of John Brown's Body in 1959 that is widely circulated today. The lyrics differ significantly from earlier versions, and include a stanza from Battle Hymn Of The Republic, itself an 1862 adaptation of John Brown's Body written by abolitionist Julia Ward Howe.

John Brown's body lies a-moldering in the grave (x3)
But his soul goes marching on.

Glory, glory hallelujah! (x3)
But his soul goes marching on.

The stars above in heaven are a-looking kindly down (x3)
On the grave of old John Brown.

Glory, glory hallelujah! (x3)
His soul goes marching on.

He captured Harper's Ferry with his nineteen men so true
He frightened old Virginia till she trembled through and through
They hanged him for a traitor, they themselves the traitor crew
His soul goes marching on!

Glory, glory hallelujah! (x3)
His soul goes marching on.

Well he's gone to be a soldier in the army of the Lord,
He's gone to be a soldier in the army of the Lord (x2)
But his soul goes marching on!

Glory, glory hallelujah! (x3)
His soul goes marching on.

Mine eyes hath seen the glory of the coming of the Lord
He is trampling out the vintage where the grapes of wrath is stored
He'th loosed the fateful lightning of his terrible swift sword
His truth is marching on!

Glory, glory hallelujah! (x3)
His soul goes marching on.

== See also ==
- Triumphal March (Triumphal March on the Occasion of the World's Columbian Exposition in Chicago, 1893)
