= 2006 Tennessee Volunteers football team =

American college football season

2006 Tennessee Volunteers football

Outback Bowl, L 10–20 vs. Penn State
- Conference: Southeastern Conference
- Eastern Division

Ranking
- Coaches: No. 23
- AP: No. 25
- Record: 9–4 (5–3 SEC)
- Head coach: Phillip Fulmer (14th season)
- Offensive coordinator: David Cutcliffe (7th season)
- Offensive scheme: Pro-style
- Defensive coordinator: John Chavis (12th season)
- Base defense: Multiple 4–3
- Home stadium: Neyland Stadium

2006 Southeastern Conference football standings
	Conf.			Overall
Team	W		L	W		L
Eastern Division
No. 1 Florida x$#	7	–	1	13	–	1
No. 25 Tennessee	5	–	3	9	–	4
No. 23 Georgia	4	–	4	9	–	4
Kentucky	4	–	4	8	–	5
South Carolina	3	–	5	8	–	5
Vanderbilt	1	–	7	4	–	8
Western Division
No. 15 Arkansas x	7	–	1	10	–	4
No. 9 Auburn	6	–	2	11	–	2
No. 3 LSU %	6	–	2	11	–	2
Alabama	2	–	6	6	–	7
Ole Miss	2	–	6	4	–	8
Mississippi State	1	–	7	3	–	9
Championship: Florida 38, Arkansas 28
# – BCS National Champion; $ – BCS representative as conference champion; % – BCS at-large representative; x – Division champion/co-champions; Alabama had all victories vacated by the NCAA in 2010. As such, the official record for Alabama is 0–7 (0–6).; Rankings from AP Poll

The 2006 Tennessee Volunteers football team represented the University of Tennessee in the 2006 NCAA Division I FBS football season. Tennessee entered the 2006 season coming off a 5–6 record (3–5 SEC) in 2005. The Volunteers were given a preseason ranking of #23 in both the Coaches' Poll and the AP Poll.

Led by head coach Phillip Fulmer, the Volunteers played their home games at Neyland Stadium. The 2006 season saw a turnaround from the previous year's losing record. The Vols added four wins from the total of the previous season. Also notable was the breakout year turned in by wide receiver Robert Meachem who broke the single season school record for receiving yards.

== Preseason ==
The Volunteers were picked by the media as a preseason third place in the SEC's Eastern Division at SEC Media Days. Tennessee was picked as low as 4th by the preseason magazines, with only one, Phil Steele, picking the Vols to win the East Division.

The Vols had last won a conference and national title in 1998. Their last SEC East title had been in 2004.

== Schedule ==
Date	Time	Opponent	Rank	Site	TV	Result	Attendance
September 2	5:30 p.m.	No. 9 California*	No. 23	Neyland Stadium; Knoxville, TN	ESPN	W 35–18	106,009
September 9	7:00 p.m.	Air Force*	No. 11	Neyland Stadium; Knoxville, TN	PPV	W 31–30	105,466
September 16	8:00 p.m.	No. 7 Florida	No. 13	Neyland Stadium; Knoxville, TN (Third Saturday in September)	CBS	L 20–21	106,818
September 23	5:00 p.m.	Marshall*^{†}	No. 15	Neyland Stadium; Knoxville, TN	PPV	W 33–7	104,818
September 30	12:00 p.m.	at Memphis*	No. 15	Liberty Bowl Memorial Stadium; Memphis, TN	ESPN	W 41–7	61,783
October 7	7:45 p.m.	at No. 10 Georgia	No. 13	Sanford Stadium; Athens, GA (rivalry)	ESPN	W 51–33	92,746
October 21	3:30 p.m.	Alabama	No. 7	Neyland Stadium; Knoxville, TN (Third Saturday in October)	CBS	W 16–13	106,695
October 28	7:45 p.m.	at South Carolina	No. 8	Williams-Brice Stadium; Columbia, SC (College GameDay) (rivalry)	ESPN	W 31–24	82,011
November 4	3:30 p.m.	No. 13 LSU	No. 8	Neyland Stadium; Knoxville, TN	CBS	L 24–28	106,333
November 11	7:00 p.m.	at No. 11 Arkansas	No. 13	Donald W. Reynolds Razorback Stadium; Fayetteville, AR (College GameDay)	ESPN2	L 14–31	76,728
November 18	12:30 p.m.	at Vanderbilt	No. 22	Vanderbilt Stadium; Nashville, TN (rivalry)	LFS	W 39–10	39,773
November 25	12:30 p.m.	Kentucky	No. 19	Neyland Stadium; Knoxville, TN (Battle for the Barrel)	LFS	W 17–12	104,382
January 1	11:00 a.m.	vs. Penn State*	No. 17	Raymond James Stadium; Tampa, FL (Outback Bowl)	ESPN	L 10–20	65,601
*Non-conference game; ^{†}Homecoming; Rankings from AP Poll released prior to the game; All times are in Eastern time

== Rankings ==
Ranking movements Legend: ██ Increase in ranking ██ Decrease in ranking
	Week															
Poll	Pre	1	2	3	4	5	6	7	8	9	10	11	12	13	14	Final
AP	23	11	13	15	15	13	8	7	8	8	13	22	19	17	17	25
Coaches Poll	23	17	17	19	18	14	9	9	9	8	15	23	21	19	18	23
Harris	Not released				15	13	8	8	8	8	15	22	19	18	18	Not released
BCS	Not released							11	11	11	16	22	20	16	17	Not released

== Starting lineup ==
Head Coach: Phillip Fulmer (15th year)

=== Offense ===
Offensive Coordinator: David Cutcliffe (1st year)
Offensive Scheme: Multiple (I-Form, Shotgun and Singleback)

Tennessee had many changes on the offensive staff following the 2005 season. Former Offensive Coordinator Randy Sanders resigned and later took a job as quarterback coach at Kentucky. Sanders was replaced by former Ole Miss head coach David Cutcliffe. Wide receiver coach Pat Washington and offensive line coach Jimmy Ray Stephens were fired. Washington moved on to Kansas State University, while Stephens stayed in state, taking the same position at Middle Tennessee State University. The coaches were replaced by Matt Luke, who took over as offensive line coach, and Kurt Roper, who came in to coach running backs. Trooper Taylor switched from running backs to wide receiver coach in response to the changes in staff.

Position	Number	Name	Class
QB	10	Erik Ainge	Jr.
QB (vs. Ark)	8	Jonathan Crompton	RS-Fr.
QB (Practice Team)	11	Dennis Abram Jr	So.
TB	27	Arian Foster	RS-So.
TB	22	LaMarcus Coker	RS-Fr.
FB	45	Cory Anderson	RS-Sr.
TE	28	Chris Brown	Jr.
TE	86	Brad Cottam	Jr.
WR	9	Bret Smith	Sr.
WR	1	Jayson Swain	Sr.
WR	3	Robert Meachem	RS-Jr.
LT	76	Arron Sears	Sr.
LG	66	David Ligon	RS-Sr.
C (Beginning of Season)	73	Michael Frogg	RS-Jr.
C (Replacement)	50	Josh McNeil	RS-Fr.
RG	75	Anthony Parker	RS-So.
RT	54	Eric Young	RS-Jr.

=== Defense ===
Defensive Coordinator: John Chavis (19th year)
Base Defense: Multiple (4–3 and 3–2–6 "Mustang")

The entire Tennessee defensive staff returned for the 2006 season. The group of Johnny Chavis, Dan Brooks, Steve Caldwell, and Larry Slade have been together since the 1999 season.

Position	Number	Name	Class
LE and LT	90	Turk McBride	Sr.
LE (Post Harrell Injury)	93	Xavier Mitchell	Jr.
LT (Until Injury)	92	Justin Harrell	Sr.
RT	68	Matt McGlothlin	Sr.
RE	89	Antonio Reynolds	Jr.
SLB	39	Ryan Karl	Jr.
MLB	40	Marvin Mitchell	Sr.
WLB	7	Jerod Mayo	RS-So.
LCB	4	Jonathan Wade	Sr.
RCB (Until Injury)	29	Inquoris Johnson	Jr.
SS-RCB	24	Antwan Stewart	Sr.
FS	33	Jonathan Hefney	Jr.
SS (After Johnson Injury)	20	Demetrice Morley	So.

=== Special teams ===
Position	Number	Name	Class
K	25	James Wilhoit	Sr.
KR	22	LaMarcus Coker	RS-Fr.
KR	6	Ja'Kouri Williams	RS-So.
KR	12	Lucas Taylor	So.
P	47	Britton Colquitt	So.
PR (Until Injury)	21	Austin Rogers	So.
PR (After Rogers Injury)	33	Jonathan Hefney	Jr.

== Game summaries ==
=== California ===
	1	2	3	4	Total
#9 California	0	0	3	15	18
#23 Tennessee	7	7	21	0	35

The Volunteers looked impressive in their first game after the 5–6 2005 season. Tennessee led 35–0 late in the 3rd quarter before putting in reserve players. Erik Ainge connected for 4 TD passes, with 4 scoring plays of more than 40 yards. Sports Illustrated's "By The Numbers" noted that Tennessee had only 1 scoring play of more than 40 yards in the entire previous season. WR Robert Meachem caught two long touchdown passes.

On Defense, Tennessee held the highly touted Golden Bears scoreless for almost 3 entire quarters. They were led by Ryan Karl with 9 Tackles, while Antwan Stewart and Inky Johnson each had an interception. Cal QB Nate Longshore was held to 85 yards passing, while preseason All American RB Marshawn Lynch was limited to 76 yards rushing.

=== Air Force ===
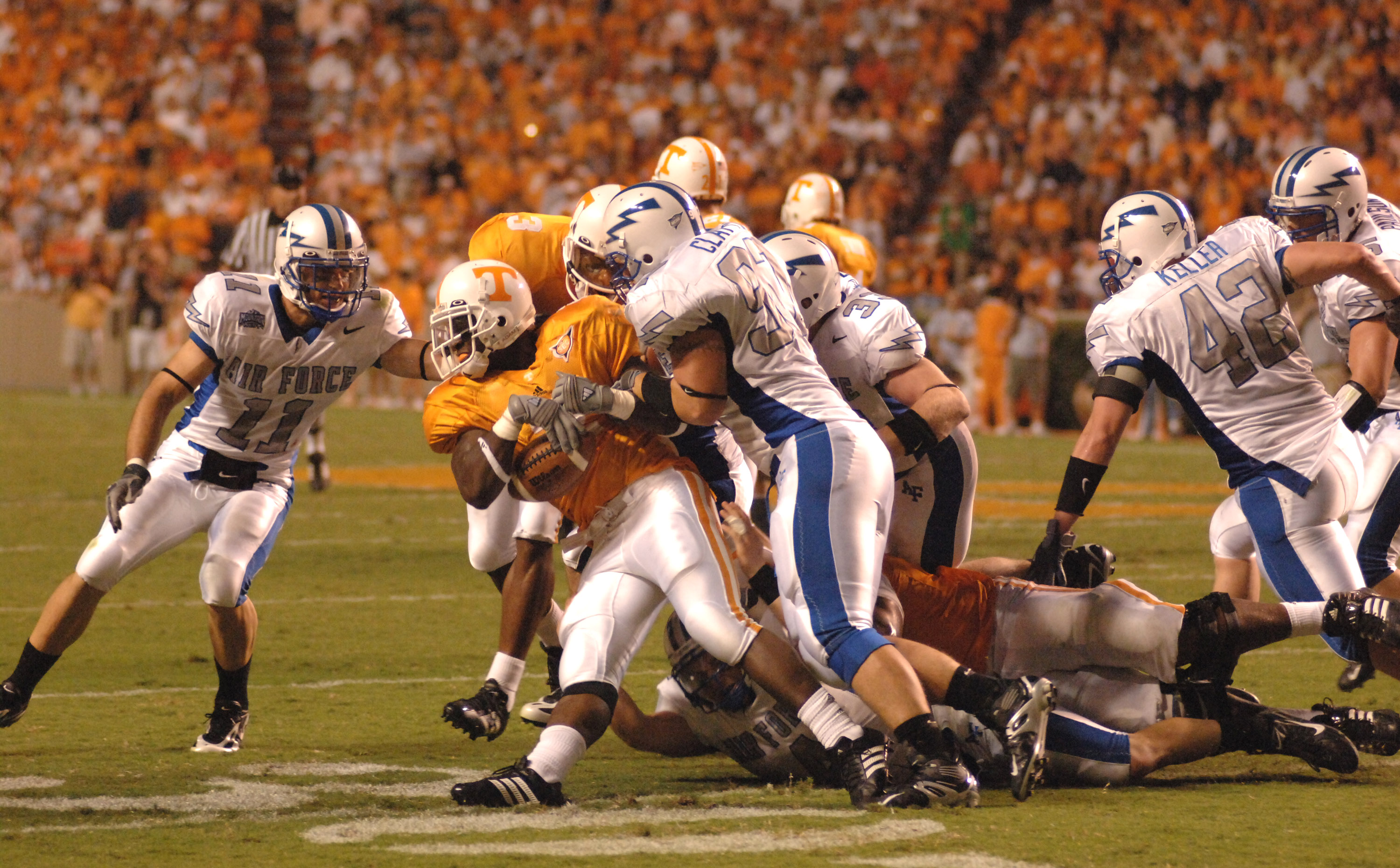
Air Force Academy Falcons free safety Bobby Giannini (#11) prepares to finish off Tennessee tailback Montario Hardesty, while Falcons defensive end Josh Clayton (#97) loosens Hardesty's grip on the football.

	1	2	3	4	Total
Air Force	7	3	7	13	30
#17 Tennessee	3	14	7	7	31

Tennessee avoided an upset by stopping a two-point conversion with less than two minutes remaining. DE Xavier Mitchell made the stop in the backfield as the Vols avoided the late charge. Tennessee led 31–17 late in the 4th quarter before an interception and onside kick recovery allowed the Air Force Academy to close the gap.

Erik Ainge moved into the top ranking for NCAA passer efficiency by going 24 for 29 with 1 interception and 3 touchdowns.

The Air Force Flexbone offense gave the Tennessee defense trouble and racked up 281 rushing yards. The Vols also lost DT Justin Harrell and CB Inky Johnson for the season to injury (Though Harrell would be able to play sparingly against Florida before his surgery).

=== Florida ===
	1	2	3	4	Total
#7 Florida	7	0	7	7	21
#17 Tennessee	3	7	7	3	20

The Vols lost their SEC Opener in a hard-fought battle with the Florida Gators. Florida held the Tennessee offense to −11 rushing yards en route to a 21–20 victory. Florida QB Chris Leak passed for 3 TD's including the game winner to Dallas Baker with 6:30 left to play.

Tennessee took the lead in the 2nd quarter after scoring on a trick play. WR Lucas Taylor took a reverse pitch and threw a pass to backup RB LaMarcus Coker. The Vols Defense sacked Leak 3 times.

One controversial play cost the Vols 7 points. MLB Marvin Mitchell intercepted a pass and returned it for a TD. The play was nullified by a roughing the passer penalty on J.T. Mapu for a hit to the head. Replays showed that Mapu was swiping at the ball and made contact with Leak's helmet.

=== Marshall ===
	1	2	3	4	Total
Marshall	0	7	0	0	7
#19 Tennessee	9	7	0	17	33

The Volunteers took a while to get going... but only because the kickoff was postponed for 1 hour due to lightning. Soon after, Tennessee rolled to a 33–7 victory. The Defense led the way, holding Marshall to 236 total yards. Xavier Mitchell and Matt McGlothlin sacked Marshall QB Bernard Morris for a safety to start the scoring. Backup RB LaMarcus Coker got his second career TD on an 89-yard run, the longest run from scrimmage for Tennessee since 1977.

=== Memphis ===
	1	2	3	4	Total
#18 Tennessee	3	10	14	14	41
Memphis	0	0	0	7	7

Tennessee out manned unranked Memphis coached by former Vol Tommy West. The Vols racked up 571 total yards en route to a 41–7 victory. The Vols held Memphis to 122 total yards, over 50 of which came against the reserve defense. QB Erik Ainge turned in another solid performance, going 24-for-28 for 331 yards and four touchdowns. WRs Jayson Swain, Robert Meachem, and Bret Smith each had a touchdown reception, with two TDs for Swain. Memphis did have a 7–3 lead for a short time, after returning an interception for a touchdown. However, the play was called back on a penalty, and Tennessee never actually trailed the entire game.

=== Georgia ===
	1	2	3	4	Total
#14 Tennessee	7	7	10	27	51
#9 Georgia	10	14	3	6	33

Georgia took advantage of Special teams play to jump out to a 24–7 lead in the 2nd quarter. However, Tennessee stiffened its defense and scored on every possession but one in the second half to record a 51–33 victory over the ninth ranked Georgia Bulldogs. Georgia entered the game with the #1 ranked scoring defense in the nation, but the Vols dropped them to #17. Erik Ainge was 25-of-38 with 2 TD's and no interceptions. Georgia scored twice on Special teams, with one long kickoff return for a TD in the first half and a long punt return for TD in the second half. Tennessee DB Antonio Wardlow blocked and punt and recovered the ball in the endzone to post a TD for the Vols in the 2nd half. Robert Meachem had 7 receptions for 98 yards and moved into first place nationally for receiving yards per game. A photo of Wardlow's punt block and recovery made the cover of Sports Illustrated for October 16, 2006.

=== Alabama ===
	1	2	3	4	Total
Alabama	3	3	7	0	13
# 9 Tennessee	0	3	3	10	16

The Vols won a close contest, regaining bragging rights for the Third Saturday in October. Erik Ainge struggled early, but the Vols overcame their QB's 3 interception first half performance with strong defense and timely scoring. Tennessee held the Tide offense to 211 total yards and 13 points. Arian Foster scored the go-ahead touchdown with 3:02 left to play in the game to give the Vols the 16–13 win. James Wilhoit went 3-for-4 on field goal attempts to account for the other nine points. Running back LaMarcus Coker sustained a knee injury that will keep him out until the Arkansas game.

Tennessee's 4th-quarter touchdown against Alabama marked the first touchdown against the Crimson Tide by the Vols in 9 quarters, a streak starting in the 2nd quarter of the 2004 game.

=== South Carolina ===
	1	2	3	4	Total
#9 Tennessee	14	0	0	17	31
South Carolina	0	10	7	7	24

Tennessee took advantages of some early turnovers and finished strong as they beat Steve Spurrier's South Carolina Gamecocks by the score of 31–24. On the second play from scrimmage, MLB Marvin Mitchell intercepted a bobbled pass and returned it 17 yards for a touchdown. On South Carolina's next possession, CB Jonathan Wade intercepted another tipped pass in the Tennessee endzone to stop a Gamecock drive. The Vol offense marched down the field and scored on a 10-play, 74-yard drive, capped off by a touchdown pass from Erik Ainge to Bret Smith. South Carolina controlled the middle part of the game, and took a 17–14 lead with 4:10 left in the 3rd quarter. However, the Vols responded with a long scoring drive, and a 1 play scoring drive after a long Jonathan Hefney punt return. The Vols led 31–17 until South Carolina scored with 2:45 remaining in the game. The Vols had to recover an onside kick and stop one last Gamecock offensive stand. An interception by Demetrius Morley on the final play of the game sealed the win. QB Erik Ainge suffered an ankle injury. CB Jonathan Wade was named the SEC Defensive Player of the Week for his efforts against South Carolina. Wade had an interception in the endzone, 2 pass breakups and 4 solo tackles.

=== LSU ===
	1	2	3	4	Total
#13 LSU	0	7	14	7	28
#8 Tennessee	0	10	7	7	24

LSU QB JaMarcus Russell threw a touchdown pass with 9 seconds remaining to give the LSU Tigers a 28–24 victory over Tennessee. The Vols looked good at times during the game, but could not make a stop on LSU's final drive of the game, which consumed 7:14 from the clock. QB Erik Ainge, starting with a sore ankle, was replaced in the 1st quarter by redshirt freshman Jonathan Crompton. Crompton performed well for his first significant action, connecting on two long touchdown passes to Robert Meachem. On Defense, Tennessee intercepted Russell 3 times and recovered 1 fumble.

=== Arkansas ===
	1	2	3	4	Total
#15 Tennessee	0	7	0	7	14
#11 Arkansas	7	21	0	3	31

The Razorbacks dominated the Vols on both sides of the ball and took a 28–7 lead into the locker room at half time. Arkansas won the game 31–14, predominantly by controlling the line of scrimmage. Arkansas out rushed Tennessee 259–92, with 191 yards by Razorback Darren McFadden. Redshirt freshman Jonathan Crompton started his first game, after playing most of the previous week's game against LSU. Crompton struggled, going 16-for-34 with 1 interception and 2 touchdowns.

=== Vanderbilt ===
	1	2	3	4	Total
#23 Tennessee	6	13	10	10	39
Vanderbilt	0	7	0	3	10

Tennessee avenged last year's upset loss to Vanderbilt by beating the Commodores, 39–10. The Vols took a 19–7 lead into halftime and were not in any danger of giving up the lead in the second half. Ainge capped the victory with a 17-yard TD toss to Robert Meachem early in the fourth quarter for a 36–7 lead. Meachem had seven catches for 95 yards, and Wilhoit had a career-high 15 points with field goals of 43, 27 and 41. The Vols shut down an offense that had been fifth in the SEC averaging 363.1 yards per game and the nation's top receiver in Earl Bennett. He had four catches for 16 yards a week after a career-high 220 yards receiving. Chris Nickson, who had 517 yards total offense against Kentucky, was held to 97 yards passing and 44 yards rushing. "We kept an eye on (him)," said Tennessee cornerback Jonathan Wade, "We never lost him." Vanderbilt took its only lead at 7–6 when Nickson connected with George Smith on a 7-yard TD pass to culminate a drive that ate up nearly half of the second quarter. The Vols answered this score with a 6-play, 80-yard drive. The drive was capped off by an 8-yard touchdown run by LaMarcus Coker. Coker ended the day with 126 yards on 10 carries and 2 touchdowns.

=== Kentucky ===
	1	2	3	4	Total
Kentucky	0	12	0	0	12
#20 Tennessee	10	0	0	7	17

The Vols scored their 22nd consecutive victory over the Wildcats of Kentucky with a 17–12 win. The 22 game streak is currently the longest in the nation after Navy defeated Notre Dame in 2007.

Tennessee held the Wildcats scoreless in the second half, and held back a go-ahead drive by the Wildcats in the 4th quarter. Kentucky drove down to the 2-yard line, before a delay of game penalty and two incompletions stifled their scoring effort. Kentucky outgained the Vols 410 to 336 yards, however, they were stopped on two trips inside the twenty, and on a 4th down play at the Tennessee 28. Kentucky K Lonas Seiber also missed an extra point and 33-yard field goal.

Robert Meachem had another good game for the Vols, with six catches for 116 yards and a touchdown. With his effort, Meachem broke the school record for receiving yards in a season.

=== Outback Bowl: Penn State ===
	1	2	3	4	Total
Penn State	0	10	0	10	20
#18 Tennessee	3	7	0	0	10

The Vols ended the season on a sour note by dropping the 2007 Outback Bowl to the Penn State by the score of 20–10. The Vols were driving for the go-ahead score midway through the 4th quarter before Arian Foster fumbled. The fumble was scooped up by the Lions' Tony Davis and returned for an 88-yard touchdown. The play proved to be decisive as Penn State added another field goal for the final margin of victory.

Penn State RB Tony Hunt turned in a strong performance, running for 165 yards. The Vols defense allowed 380 total yards, but limited the Nittany Lions to only one touchdown scoring drive and surrendered only 13 points. James Wilhoit hit a 44-yard field goal and an extra point in his final game as a Vol. RB LaMarcus Coker had a 42-yard rushing touchdown in the second quarter.

== Honors ==
- Erik Ainge – Cingular All-America Player of the Week (Oct. 13)

SEC Offensive Player of the Week (Oct. 9)
Walter Camp National Player of the Week (Oct. 8)

- Johnny Chavis – Assistant Football Coach of the Year (by the American Football Coaches Association).
- Britton Colquitt – The Sporting News 1st team All SEC

Coaches 1st team All SEC
AP 1st team All SEC

- LaMarcus Coker – The Sporting News 1st team Freshman All SEC

SEC Coaches All Freshman team

- Jonathan Hefney – Rivals.com 2nd team All-America

The Sporting News 2nd team All SEC
Coaches 2nd team All SEC
AP 2nd team All SEC

- Jerod Mayo – Rivals.com 2nd team All American
- Turk McBride – SEC Defensive Lineman of the Week (Nov. 28)

The Sporting News 1st team All SEC
AP 1st team All SEC

- Rico McCoy – SEC Coaches All Freshman team
- Josh McNeil – The Sporting News 1st Team Freshman All SEC

SEC Coaches All Freshman team

- Robert Meachem – Football Writers Association of America 1st team All-America

Rivals.com 1st team All-America
The Sporting News 1st team All SEC
Coaches 1st team All SEC
AP 1st team All SEC

- Arron Sears – Walter Camp 1st team All-America

AFCA 1st team All-America
Rivals.com 3rd team All-America
The Sporting News 1st team All SEC
Coaches 1st team All SEC
AP 1st team All SEC
Jacobs Award (Top Blocker in the SEC)

- Jonathan Wade – SEC Defensive Player of the Week (Oct. 30)

The Sporting News 2nd team All SEC
Coaches 2nd team All SEC
AP 2nd team All SEC

- James Wilhoit – SEC Special Teams Player of the Week (Nov. 21)

The Sporting News 1st team All SEC
Coaches 1st team All SEC
AP 1st team All SEC

== Team players drafted into the NFL ==
Player	Position	Round	Pick	NFL club
Justin Harrell	Defensive tackle	1	16	Green Bay Packers
Robert Meachem	Wide receiver	1	27	New Orleans Saints
Arron Sears	Offensive guard	2	35	Tampa Bay Buccaneers
Turk McBride	Defensive end	2	54	Kansas City Chiefs
Jonathan Wade	Cornerback	3	84	St. Louis Rams
Marvin Mitchell	Linebacker	7	220	New Orleans Saints
