= 2007 Tennessee Volunteers football team =

American college football season

2007 Tennessee Volunteers football

SEC Eastern Division co-champion Outback Bowl champion

SEC Championship Game, L 14–21 vs. LSU

Outback Bowl, W 21–17 vs. Wisconsin
- Conference: Southeastern Conference
- Eastern Division

Ranking
- Coaches: No. 12
- AP: No. 12
- Record: 10–4 (6–2 SEC)
- Head coach: Phillip Fulmer (15th season)
- Offensive coordinator: David Cutcliffe (8th season)
- Offensive scheme: Pro-style
- Defensive coordinator: John Chavis (13th season)
- Base defense: Multiple 4–3
- Home stadium: Neyland Stadium

2007 Southeastern Conference football standings
	Conf.			Overall
Team	W		L	W		L
Eastern Division
No. 12 Tennessee xy	6	–	2	10	–	4
No. 2 Georgia x%	6	–	2	11	–	2
No. 13 Florida	5	–	3	9	–	4
South Carolina	3	–	5	6	–	6
Kentucky	3	–	5	8	–	5
Vanderbilt	2	–	6	5	–	7
Western Division
No. 1 LSU x$#	6	–	2	12	–	2
No. 15 Auburn	5	–	3	9	–	4
Arkansas	4	–	4	8	–	5
Mississippi State	4	–	4	8	–	5
Alabama	4	–	4	7	–	6
Ole Miss	0	–	8	3	–	9
Championship: LSU 21, Tennessee 14
# – BCS National Champion; $ – BCS representative as conference champion; % – BCS at-large representative; x – Division champion/co-champions; y – Championship game participant; Alabama had 5 victories vacated by the NCAA in 2010. As such, the official record for Alabama is 2–6 (1–4).; Rankings from AP Poll

The 2007 Tennessee Volunteers football team represented the University of Tennessee in the 2007 NCAA Division I FBS football season. They won the Eastern Division of the Southeastern Conference before falling to the eventual national champion LSU Tigers in the SEC Championship Game. The Vols capped off the season by defeating the Wisconsin Badgers in the Outback Bowl to finish with a record of 10–4.

The team was led by head coach Phillip Fulmer. The Volunteers played their home games at Neyland Stadium in Knoxville, Tennessee. The 2007 season was the last at Tennessee for four assistants on the staff. Offensive coordinator David Cutcliffe left to be head coach at Duke, taking assistants Matt Luke and Kurt Roper with him, while wide receivers coach Trooper Taylor accepted a co-offensive coordinator's position at Oklahoma State.

== Preseason ==
Tennessee headed into the 2007 season looking to build on an average 2006 campaign to UT standards where the team went 9–4 with narrow losses to eventual national champion Florida and also to LSU. This year the team returned 11 starters (2nd fewest in SEC). The schedule was ranked 6th toughest in the country entering the year, with road games at California, Alabama, and Florida.

Tennessee also played key games against Georgia, South Carolina, and Arkansas at Neyland Stadium.

== Schedule ==
Date	Time	Opponent	Rank	Site	TV	Result	Attendance
September 1	8:00 p.m.	at No. 12 California*	No. 15	California Memorial Stadium; Berkeley, CA	ABC	L 31–45	72,516
September 8	7:00 p.m.	Southern Miss*	No. 24	Neyland Stadium; Knoxville, TN	PPV	W 39–19	106,311
September 15	3:30 p.m.	at No. 3 Florida	No. 22	Ben Hill Griffin Stadium; Gainesville, FL (rivalry)	CBS	L 20–59	90,707
September 22	7:00 p.m.	Arkansas State*		Neyland Stadium; Knoxville, TN	PPV	W 48–27	102,368
October 6	3:30 p.m.	No. 12 Georgia		Neyland Stadium; Knoxville, TN (rivalry)	CBS	W 35–14	107,052
October 13	2:30 p.m.	at Mississippi State	No. 25	Davis Wade Stadium; Starkville, MS	PPV	W 33–21	50,217
October 20	12:30 p.m.	at Alabama	No. 20	Bryant–Denny Stadium; Tuscaloosa, AL (Third Saturday in October)	LFS	L 17–41	92,138
October 27	7:45 p.m.	No. 15 South Carolina		Neyland Stadium; Knoxville, TN (rivalry)	ESPN	W 27–24 ^{OT}	105,962
November 3	4:00 p.m.	Louisiana–Lafayette*^{†}	No. 24	Neyland Stadium; Knoxville, TN		W 59–7	96,197
November 10	12:30 p.m.	Arkansas	No. 22	Neyland Stadium; Knoxville, TN	LFS	W 34–13	104,459
November 17	2:00 p.m.	Vanderbilt	No. 19	Neyland Stadium; Knoxville, TN (rivalry)	PPV	W 25–24	105,077
November 24	3:30 p.m.	at Kentucky	No. 19	Commonwealth Stadium; Lexington, KY (rivalry)	CBS	W 52–50 ^{4OT}	69,813
December 1	4:00 p.m.	vs. No. 5 LSU	No. 14	Georgia Dome; Atlanta, GA (SEC Championship Game)	CBS	L 14–21	73,832
January 1	11:00 a.m.	vs. No. 18 Wisconsin*	No. 16	Raymond James Stadium; Tampa, FL (Outback Bowl)	ESPN	W 21–17	60,121
*Non-conference game; ^{†}Homecoming; Rankings from AP Poll; All times are in Eastern time

== Players ==
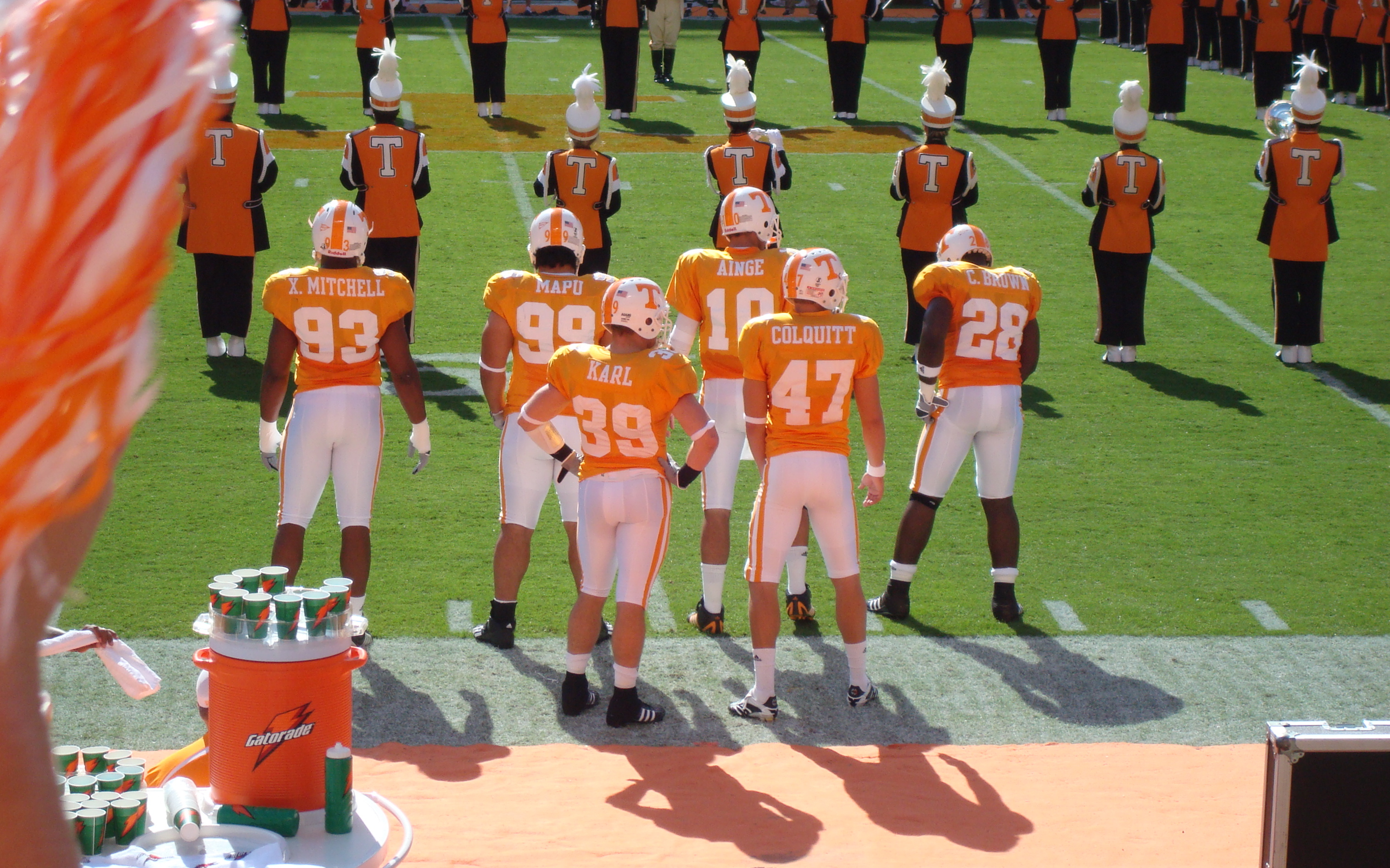
2007 Captains vs. Georgia

=== Starting lineups and coaches ===
Head Coach: Phillip Fulmer (16th year)

==== Offense ====
Offensive coordinator / quarterbacks / Assistant Head Coach: David Cutcliffe
Offensive Scheme: Multiple (I-Form, Shotgun and Singleback)

Player Development / wide receivers / Assistant Head Coach: Trooper Taylor
Offensive line: Greg Adkins
Running backs: Kurt Roper
Tight ends / Off. Line / Dir. Recruiting: Matt Luke

Offensive recap

Coaches
Head coach Phillip Fulmer hired David Cutcliffe, former 6-year head coach at Ole Miss, after being the Tennessee offensive coordinator from '93–'98. Tennessee scored 30+ ppg in each of his first 6 years as the offensive coordinator and went from 18.6 to 27.8 ppg in 2006. In 2007, Tennessee ranked 54th in total offense, 73rd in rushing offense, and 35th in passing offense. The scoring offense ranked 36th.

Quarterbacks
Senior Erik Ainge suffered a knee injury in spring but started each game of the season. Ainge was hampered by a finger and shoulder injury suffered in the season opener at California. Ainge finished behind Heisman Trophy winner Tim Tebow and Andre Woodson in all-conference voting, earning honorable mention honors.

Runningbacks
Arian Foster saw the majority of time at tailback, with relief appearances by LaMarcus Coker, Montario Hardesty, and Lennon Creer. Coker was eventually dismissed from the team following the South Carolina game for a violation of team rules. Foster finished the season with 1193 rushing yards.

Receivers
The Wide Receivers were led by Juniors Lucas Taylor and Josh Briscoe, along with redshirt Sophomore Austin Rogers. Taylor had 73 receptions for 1,000 yards while Rogers caught 56 passes for 624 yards.

Offensive line
The Offensive line returned three starters in T Eric Young, G Anthony Parker and C Josh McNeil. The remaining two positions were filled by improved junior Ramon Foster (T) and Chris Scott (G). Young was injured late in the season and was replaced by Jacques McClendon at guard, while Scott moved to Young's tackle position.

Tight ends
Chris Brown started most of the season at TE due to a preseason injury to Brad Cottam. Cottam returned late in the season when it appeared that the NCAA would deny his redshirt appeal.

Starters for the majority of the season.

Position	Number	Name	Height	Weight	Class	Hometown
QB	10	* Erik Ainge	6'6"	220 lbs.	Sr.	Hillsboro, Oregon
TB	27	* Arian Foster	6'1"	225 lbs.	Jr.	San Diego, California
TE/H-Back	28	* Chris Brown	6'3"	250 lbs.	Sr.	Destrehan, Louisiana
TE	86	Brad Cottam	6'8"	270 lbs.	Sr.	Germantown, Tennessee
WR	12	Lucas Taylor	6'0"	185 lbs.	Jr.	Carencro, Louisiana
WR	21	Austin Rogers	6'2"	185 lbs.	So.	Nashville, Tennessee
WR	81	Josh Briscoe	6'3"	183 lbs.	Jr.	Lawndale, North Carolina
LT	54	* Eric Young	6'4"	305 lbs.	Sr.	Union, South Carolina
LG	75	* Anthony Parker	6'3"	305 lbs.	Jr.	Jonesboro, Georgia
C	50	* Josh McNeil	6'4"	280 lbs.	So.	Collins, Mississippi
RG	79	Chris Scott	6'5"	325 lbs.	So.	Lovejoy, Georgia
RT	78	Ramon Foster	6'6"	325 lbs.	Jr.	Henning, Tennessee

- * – Denotes returning starter.

==== Defense ====
Defensive coordinator / Linebackers / Associate head coach: John Chavis (20th year)
Base Defense: Multiple (4–3 and 3–2–6 "Mustang")

Defensive line: Dan Brooks
Defensive ends: Steve Caldwell
Defensive backs: Larry Slade

Position Outlook

Coaches
2007 Was the 13th season as Defensive Coordinator for John Chavis. The Defensive staff had been together and unchanged since the 1999 Season, with Dan Brooks, Steve Caldwell and Larry Slade.

Defensive line
The Defensive Line was stabilized by senior DE's Xavier Mitchell and Antonio Reynolds, who started each game of the season. Senior DT J.T. Mapu started against California but was replaced by Sophomore Dan Williams. Sophomore DeMonte Bolden started at the other tackle spot.

Linebackers
The Vols had a steady group at Linebacker for the 2007 season. Senior Ryan Karl and Sophomore Rico McCoy manned the outside spots, while Junior Jerod Mayo earned All-SEC honors at MLB.

Defensive backs
The Defensive Backfield saw a slew of injuries and changes. The season started with Jonathan Hefney and Jerod Parrish at safety, while Antonio Gaines and Marsalous Johnson started at cornerback. However, only Hefney retained his spot, as injury and impressive play allowed Freshmen Eric Berry, Brent Vinson and Dennis Rogan to emerge for the unit. Junior College transfer DeAngelo Willingham also saw significant time.

Starters for the majority of the year.

Position	Number	Name	Height	Weight	Class	Hometown
LE	93	Xavier Mitchell	6'3"	255 lbs.	Sr.	Long Beach, Mississippi
LT	55	Dan Williams	6'2"	310 lbs.	So.	Memphis, Tennessee
RT	98	Demonté Bolden	6'6"	290 lbs.	Jr.	Chattanooga, Tennessee
RE	89	Antonio Reynolds	6'3"	270 lbs.	Sr.	Akron, Ohio
SLB	39	* Ryan Karl	6'0"	218 lbs.	Sr.	Franklin, Tennessee
MLB	7	* Jerod Mayo	6'2"	230 lbs.	Jr.	Hampton, Virginia
WLB	5	Rico McCoy	6'1"	215 lbs.	So.	Washington, D.C.
RCB	24	DeAngelo Willingham	6'0"	205 lbs.	Jr.	Walterboro, South Carolina
LCB	13	Brent Vinson	6'2"	180 lbs.	Fr.	Hampton, Virginia
FS	33	* Jonathan Hefney	5'10"	185 lbs.	Sr.	Rock Hill, South Carolina
SS	14	Eric Berry	5'11"	195 lbs.	Fr.	Fairburn, Georgia

- * – Denotes returning starter

==== Special teams ====
Position Outlook
Freshman Daniel Lincoln replaced departing Senior James Wilhoit and earned All American Honors. Britton Colquitt returned as punter and took over Wilhoit's duties on kickoffs. Rogan emerged as the main kick and punt returner, with Lennon Creer joining him as kick return following Coker's dismissal.

Starters for the majority of the year

Position	Number	Name	Height	Weight	Class	Hometown
P	47	* Britton Colquitt	6'3"	205 lbs.	Jr.	Knoxville, Tennessee
PR	41	Dennis Rogan	5'10"	175 lbs.	Fr.	Knoxville, Tennessee
KO	26	Daniel Lincoln	6'0"	204 lbs.	Fr.	Ocala, Florida
KR	41	Dennis Rogan	5'10"	175 lbs.	Fr.	Knoxville, Tennessee
KR	3	Lennon Creer	6'1"	202 lbs.	Fr.	Tatum, Texas
PK	26	Daniel Lincoln	6'0"	204 lbs.	Fr.	Ocala, Florida

- * – Denotes returning starter

=== Top newcomers for 2007 ===
1. Eric Berry, CB, #14, 5'11", 194 lbs., Creekside HS (Fairburn, Georgia)
2. Chris Donald, LB, #40, 6'2", 220 lbs., Huntingdon HS (Huntingdon, Tennessee)
3. Ben Martin, DE, #90, 6'5", 230 lbs., La Salle HS (Cincinnati)
4. Gerald Jones, ATH, #4, 6', 185 lbs., Millwood HS (Oklahoma City, Oklahoma)
5. DeAngelo Willingham, CB, #24, 6', 205 lbs., College of the Desert [Palm Desert, California] (Walterboro, South Carolina)
6. Nevin McKenzie, S, #20, 6'3", 210 lbs., Trinity Valley CC [Athens, Texas] (San Antonio, Texas)
7. Brent Vinson, S, #13, 6'2", 180 lbs., Hargrave Military Academy [Chatham, Virginia] (Hampton, Virginia)
8. Lennon Creer, RB, #3, 6'1", 202 lbs., Tatum HS (Tatum, Texas)
9. B. J. Coleman, QB, #18, 6'4", 210 lbs., The McCallie School (Chattanooga, Tennessee)
10. Darris Sawtelle, OL, #76, 6'6", 290 lbs., Brother Rice HS (Birmingham, Michigan)
11. Ahmad Paige, WR, #82, 6'3", 175 lbs., Sterlington HS (Sterlington, Louisiana)
12. Art Evans, ATH, #25, 6'1", 185 lbs., Evangelical Christian HS (Lakeland, Florida)
13. Donald Langley, DT, #58, 6'2", 295 lbs., Seneca Valley HS (Germantown, Maryland)
14. Chris Walker, DE, #84, 6'3", 220 lbs., Christian Brothers HS (Memphis, Tennessee)
15. Denarius Moore, WR, #83, 6'1", 180 lbs., Tatum HS (Tatum, Texas)
16. William Brimfield, DT, #96, 6'6", 287 lbs., Hunter-Kinard-Tyler HS (Neeses, South Carolina)
17. Kenny O'Neal, WR, #1, 6', 195 lbs., City College of San Francisco [CA] (Oakland, California)
18. C. J. Fleming, CB, #26, 5'10", 173 lbs., Highland Springs HS (Highland Springs, Virginia)
19. Anthony Anderson, CB, #36, 6', 175 lbs., Austin-East HS (Knoxville, Tennessee)
20. Savion Frazier, LB, #43, 6'1", 209 lbs., Gar-Field HS (Woodbridge, Virginia)
21. Cody Pope, OL, #77, 6'5", 275 lbs., Cathedral Catholic HS (San Diego, California)
22. Daryl Vereen, RB, #9, 6'1", 200 lbs., North Mecklenburg HS (Charlotte, North Carolina)
23. Kevin Cooper, FB, #45, 6'1", 245 lbs., Baylor School (Chattanooga, Tennessee)
24. Todd Campbell, WR, #11, 6', 183 lbs., Franklin HS (Franklin, Tennessee)
25. Tyler Maples, WR, #11, 6'2", 180 lbs., Maryville HS (Maryville, Tennessee)
26. Dennis Rogan, RB, #41, 5'10", 175 lbs., Fulton HS (Knoxville, Tennessee)
27. Deshaun Barnes, S, 6'2", 195 lbs., Lincoln HS (Tallahassee, Florida) – DNQ
28. Rufus Williams, DE, 6'3", 225 lbs., Astronaut HS (Titusville, Florida) – DNQ

- DNQ – Did not qualify

== Game summaries ==
=== California ===
	1	2	3	4	Total
Tennessee (#15)	14	7	7	3	31
California (#12)	14	17	7	7	45

Tennessee dropped its opening game for the first time in over a decade, losing on the road to California by the score of 45–31.

The Vols traveled to Berkeley for the return trip in a home-and-home series with the California Golden Bears. After Cal's loss to Tennessee the previous year, some observers and college football personalities such as LSU coach Les Miles had questioned the strength of the Pac-10. During the game, a plane with the banner "SEC rules, Pac-10 drools" flew overhead. With a solid lead in the fourth quarter, Cal fans chanted "Pac-10 football" to the Tennessee fans who had already begun leaving the stadium. Tennessee gave up the opening points when an Erik Ainge pass flew backwards, when he was hit while trying to release it. California's Worrell Williams, recovered the fumble and returned it 45 yards for the score. Cal WR DeSean Jackson also scored at touchdown on a 77-yard punt return. Cal QB Nate Longshore was 19-of-28 for 240 yards, 2 passing touchdowns and 1 rushing touchdown.

Tennessee traveled to California for the first time since playing UCLA in 1994, Peyton Manning's freshman year. Tennessee had won 12 straight season openers. The Vols opening game was on the road for the first time since 1998, when they defeated Syracuse. QB Erik Ainge played game despite suffering a broken pinky in practice. He was 32-of-47 for 270 yards and 3 touchdowns.

Jeff Tedford commented on the "revenge factor" before the game:

It's not really revenge, I think, if anything, it's redemption. But it's more about us, it's not so much about Tennessee. We didn't play very well last year when we went there and probably got caught a little too much focusing on them and the environment and that type of thing. So at practice this year, we're really just focusing on ourselves if we go out and play to our potential then we'll have a chance to be successful. Last year we didn't come close to our potential so we had no chance. Of course it's a big game like it was last year, two ranked teams, so there's a lot of people watching it to see what's going on. It wasn't that we lost the game last year, I think it was the way we lost the game last year that was the devastating part of it, that hung with us so long.

California had stressed "redemption" in this game, and ultimately came out the victors.

The Vols were led by TE/H-back Chris Brown, who had two touchdown receptions and Lucas Taylor who had 7 catches for 102 yards.

=== Southern Miss ===
	1	2	3	4	Total
Southern Miss	13	3	0	3	19
Tennessee (#24)	10	7	10	12	39

After trailing early on, Tennessee took a 17–16 second quarter lead against Southern Mississippi and never looked back. The lead was Tennessee's first of the season, having never taken the lead against California. The Vols were led on offense by receivers Austin Rogers (7 catches, 112 yards, 1 TD) and Lucas Taylor (5 catches 118 yards). Erik Ainge was 23-of-36 for 276 yards and 2 TD's. Kicker Daniel Lincoln made three field goals (38, 36, and 47 yards).

Tennessee hosted Southern Miss for its 2007 home opener. Southern Miss, a Conference USA foe, faced off against the Vols for the first time since a 19–16 loss in 2000. Tennessee now has a 49–12 record vs non-conference opponents under Fulmer. The Vols are 12–0 since 1998 vs current members of CUSA and 5–0 vs Southern Miss.

In all-time home-openers, the Big Orange have compiled an 88–18–5 (.791) record. The Vols’ last home-opening loss was a 31–0 setback against Florida on September 17, 1994.

The game marks the first starts for Freshman Eric Berry at safety, and Sophomore Dan Williams at tackle.

=== Florida ===
	1	2	3	4	Total
Tennessee (#22)	3	10	7	0	20
Florida (#3)	14	14	7	24	59

On the 1st possession of the game in the steamy Swamp, the Tennessee Volunteers went three and out. On the ensuing punt, Brandon James took the return 83 yards for Gator touchdown. Things never did get much better for the visiting team, as Florida rolled to an impressive 59–20 victory in the SEC opener for both teams.

There was, however, a brief period when it seemed that the contest would be much closer. The Gators ran out to a 28–6 lead by late in the 2nd quarter on two Tim Tebow touchdown passes and a Tebow touchdown run, along with the opening punt return. But then Tennessee QB Erik Ainge got his team's offense moving, throwing a touchdown pass just before halftime to cut the lead to 28–13 at intermission.

The Gators mounted a long drive to start the second half, but freshman Volunteer cornerback Eric Berry picked off a Tim Tebow pass (his first interception thrown in 2007) and returned it 93 yards for another Tennessee touchdown. When Florida's next drive ended in a punt, UT had the ball down only eight, 28–20.

But on the first play of the possession, Erik Ainge's handoff to running back Arian Foster was mishandled, and Gator linebacker Dustin Doe scooped up the loose ball and took it into the endzone for a Florida touchdown. Tennessee's momentum was washed away by the roar of 90,000 Gator fans, and the home team never looked back. Florida would end the game with 31 straight points, turning a close game into a runaway.

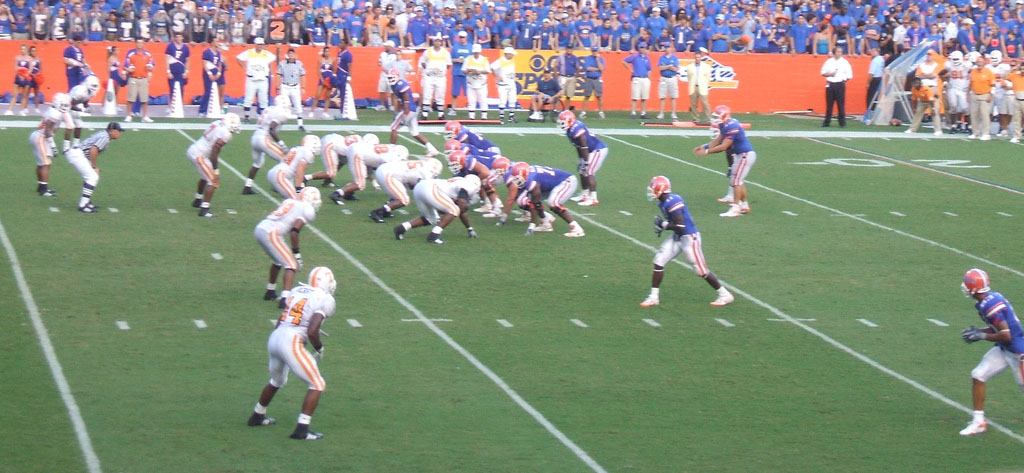
Tim Tebow prepares to run the spread option offense vs the Tennessee Volunteers.

Several Gators had excellent afternoons. Tim Tebow finished 14–19 passing for 299 yards with 2 TDs and 1 INT and rushed for 62 yards and 2 more TDs. Receiver Percy Harvin excelled as well, leading all players in rushing (9 attempts for 75 yards and 1 TD) and receiving (4 catches for 120 yards). The Florida offense rolled up 556 yards of total offense, 255 on the ground. Meanwhile, the Gator defense also did its part, holding Tennessee to just 38 yards rushing with no first downs on the ground and 293 yards total offense.

Overall, the Gators put together a historically dominating performance. Their 59 points scored was the second-highest total in the history of the series (behind only UF's 62 in the 1995 contest), and the 39 point margin of defeat was the Vols' most lopsided loss to any opponent since 1981. After the game, Tennessee still led the overall series by a narrow 19–18 margin.

=== Arkansas State ===
	1	2	3	4	Total
Arkansas State	7	10	3	7	27
Tennessee	17	14	7	10	48

Tennessee grabbed the lead first for the first time this season, and never relinquished it, as the Vols beat Arkansas State by the score of 48 to 27. The Vols entered the game unranked following the loss to Florida and were playing their second home game of the season.

QB Erik Ainge set a career-high with 334 yards passing and tied a career-high with 4 TD's while going 27-of-39. Tennessee allowed 377 total yards on defense. Lucas Taylor had 7 catches for 104 yards.

=== Georgia ===
	1	2	3	4	Total
Georgia (#12)	0	0	7	7	14
Tennessee	7	21	7	0	35

Tennessee earned its first conference victory of the season by beating the Georgia Bulldogs by the score of 35–14. Tennessee dominated the first half, leading the game by the score of 28–0. Tennessee held Georgia to 243 total yards, while picking up 190 yards on the ground. The game was a sudden turnaround for both the Defense and the Running game, which both performed poorly in the Vols' only other conference game, Florida. The win, combined with Florida's losses to Auburn and LSU puts Tennessee back into the race for the SEC Championship Game in Atlanta.

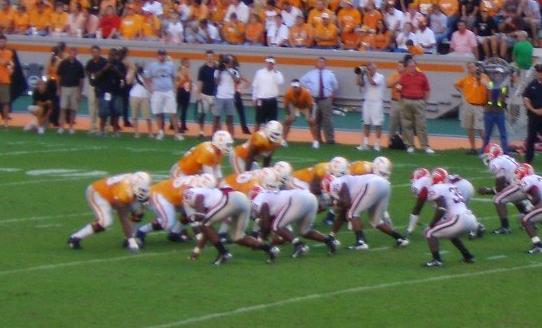
Erik Ainge and the Tennessee Volunteers offense lineup against Georgia.

The win came after head coach Phillip Fulmer came under fire by anonymous former players in an article in the Knoxville News Sentinel. Fulmer called the article "an incredible cheap shot" in the post-game press conference. Fulmer had also been receiving criticism from several other writers that follow the program.

Individual performances were highlighted by Arian Foster, who carried the ball 17 times for 98 yards, and 3 touchdowns. Backup running back Montario Hardesty added 70 yards on 14 carries with 1 TD. LB Ellix Wilson blocked a punt in the 2nd quarter.

=== Mississippi State ===
	1	2	3	4	Total
Tennessee (#25)	7	10	10	6	33
Mississippi State	7	7	7	0	21

The Vols traveled to Starkville, Mississippi for the first time since winning 35–17 in 2002. Phillip Fulmer commented on Mississippi State during the Tuesday press conference:

Mississippi State is a good football team at 4–2. They beat a good Auburn team at Auburn. They're dangerous, physical, tough guys up front. The running backs and tight ends have my good friend Woodrow McCorvey's fingerprints all over them. He is a tough guy.

Tennessee took an early lead after stopping the Bulldogs on their first drive. Erik Ainge found Chris Brown on a 4-yard TD pass to cap off at 9 play, 78-yard drive. Mississippi State then answered. The Bulldogs forced the Vols to punt after backing them up. The short field paid off, when Wesley Carroll found Tony Burks for a 38-yard touchdown pass. State took the lead in the 2nd quarter when RB Anthony Dixon broke loose on a 30-yard touchdown run.

Tennessee followed with 17 unanswered points, coming on a Lucas Taylor 51-yard touchdown reception, a 47-yard Daniel Lincoln field goal and an Arian Foster 1-yard touchdown run. Mississippi State would score one more touchdown to cut the lead to 3. However, the Vols' Defense held firm for the last quarter and a half. Daniel Lincoln added 3 field goals of 29, 26, and 43 yards to provide the final 12 point margin of victory.

Erik Ainge ended the game with a 22-of-36 performance with 1 interception and 2 touchdown passes. Lucas Taylor had 11 catches for 186 yards. Arian Foster ran the ball 21 for 143 yards, while Montario Hardesty added 81 yards on 16 carries. Tennessee outgained Mississippi State 470 to 338 total yards.

=== Alabama ===
	1	2	3	4	Total
Tennessee (#20)	7	10	0	0	17
Alabama	10	14	6	11	41

Nick Saban set a different tone for this year's "The Third Saturday in October" right from the get go. Saban elected to kick an onside kick on the opening kickoff. Alabama recovered and scored 3 on Leigh Tiffen's 39-yard field goal. Bama extended their lead to 10 when QB John Parker Wilson connected with Terry Grant on a 3-yard touchdown pass.

Tennessee then scored 14 unanswered points to take the lead early in the 2nd quarter. Arian Foster had a 2-yard touchdown run and Erik Ainge found TE Luke Stocker for a 3-yard touchdown pass. At that point Alabama took over. WR DJ Hall had 2 2nd-quarter touchdown receptions. Leigh Tiffen added 3 more field goals to bring his total to four on the day. RB Terry Grant also had an 8-yard touchdown run. Tennessee was only able to add one field goal by Daniel Lincoln, shortly before halftime, as the Crimson Tide outscored Tennessee 17–0 in the second half.

WR DJ Hall and QB John Parker Wilson had career days for Alabama. Hall had 13 receptions for 185 yards and 2 touchdowns. Wilson was 32-of-46 for 363 yards and 3 touchdowns.

=== South Carolina ===
	1	2	3	4	OT	Total
South Carolina (#15)	0	0	14	10	0	24
Tennessee	7	14	0	3	3	27

Tennessee used timely turnovers and clutch kicking to earn an ugly 27–24 overtime victory. South Carolina fought back from a 21-point deficit at halftime to take a 24–21 lead with 1:24 left. However, following a LaMarcus Coker return to the 47-yard line, Tennessee put together an 8-play, 26-yard drive to set up freshman Daniel Lincoln for the game tying 48-yard field goal. In overtime, Lincoln hit another field goal from 27 yards, while South Carolina kicker Ryan Succop missed wide right from 40 yards to give Tennessee the victory.

It was a tale of two halves in regulation. Tennessee had touchdown scoring drives of 2 yards, 44 yards, and 72 yards in the first half, but did not score in the second half until Lincoln's field goal with 9 seconds remaining. South Carolina, who was held scoreless in the first half, put together touchdown drives of 39 yards, 86 yards, and 66 yards, also adding the late field goal by Succop. The Gamecocks actually outgained Tennessee by a margin of 501 to 317 yards. However, Tennessee capitalized on 3 Gamecock turnovers. Freshman Eric Berry had a long fumble return to set up the Vols first score and added an interception in the second quarter. Berry also tipped a pass in the 4th quarter which was intercepted by Ryan Karl.

=== Louisiana-Lafayette ===
	1	2	3	4	Total
Louisiana-Lafayette	0	0	7	0	7
Tennessee (#24)	3	21	21	14	59

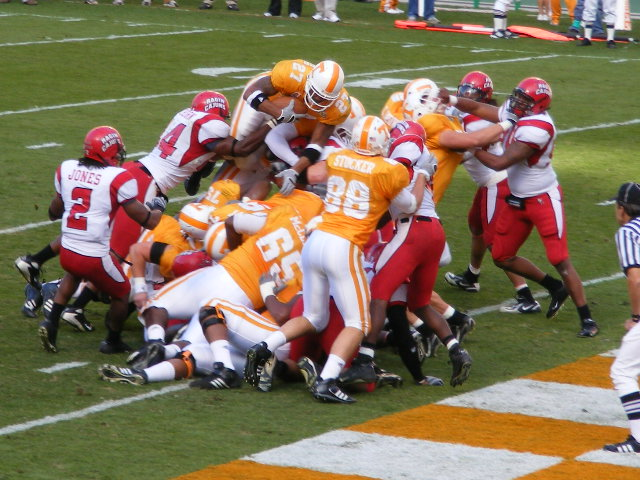
Arian Foster dives over the pile to score.

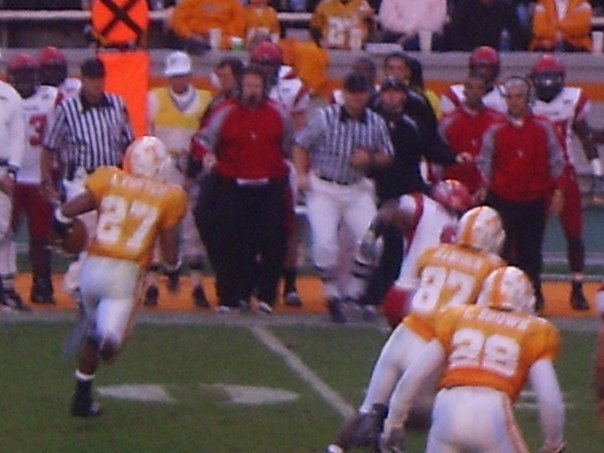
Arian Foster runs a sweep against Louisiana-Lafayette.

Tennessee rolled up it top point total of the season by scoring in creative ways en route to a 59–7 victory over Louisiana-Lafayette. Tennessee scored on Defense when DE Antonio Reynolds intercepted a tipped pass and returned it for 70 yards for a touchdown. Tennessee scored on special teams when DB Antonio Wardlow returned a blocked punt 20 yards for a touchdown. Tennessee also had 3 touchdowns by freshmen late in the game: a 30-yard run by RB Lennon Creer, a touchdown reception by Kenny O'Neal. WR Gerald Jones ran for a TD after lining up at QB. Running back Arian Foster had 2 scores in the first half.

=== Arkansas ===
	1	2	3	4	Total
Arkansas	3	0	3	7	13
Tennessee (#22)	10	10	7	7	34

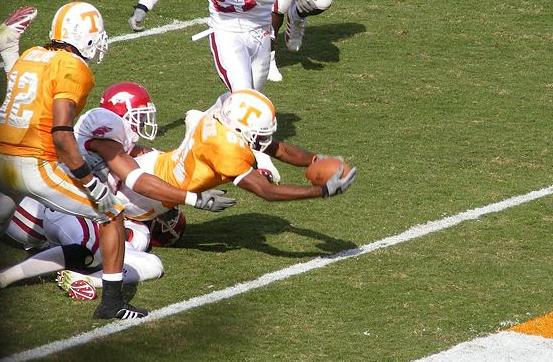
Josh Briscoe dives to score against Arkansas.

Tennessee used clock management and stout defensive play to stop Arkansas TB Darren McFadden en route to a 34–13 victory over the Razorbacks. McFadden was coming off of a game in which he broke an SEC record for yards rushing in a game vs. South Carolina. Tennessee limited him to 117 yards on 22 carries. The Vols scored on their first drive of the game which culminated with a 16-yard touchdown pass from Erik Ainge to Austin Rogers. Arkansas countered with a field goal after TB Felix Jones put them in good position with a 48-yard kick return into Tennessee territory.

Vol freshman DB Dennis Rogan countered with a return of his own, 78 yards to the Arkansas 15, setting up a Daniel Lincoln 25-yard field goal to answer the score. Tennessee added another field goal from Lincoln and a second touchdown pass in the Second Quarter. This time Ainge found WR Josh Briscoe on third and goal from the 14, to score with 10 seconds remaining in the half to push the score to 20–3.

In the second half, Tennessee forced Arkansas to punt and then Arian Foster gave the Vols a three score lead by racing 59 yards for a touchdown. Arkansas would add a Third Quarter field goal by Alex Tejada and a Fourth Quarter touchdown run by TB Michael Smith to close to within 14. However, LB Jerod Mayo sealed the game with a 34-yard interception return for a touchdown, and provided the final margin of 34–13.

SS Eric Berry had his first multi-interception game, picking off a pass at the end of each half. Tennessee won the time of possession battle 33:20 to 26:40. Foster ended with 13 carried for 88 yards. TB Montario Hardesty added 20 carries and 70 yards. Mayo led the team with 9 tackles. Dan Williams and Xavier Mitchell each had a sack.

=== Vanderbilt ===
	1	2	3	4	Total
Vanderbilt	0	17	7	0	24
Tennessee (#19)	6	3	0	16	25

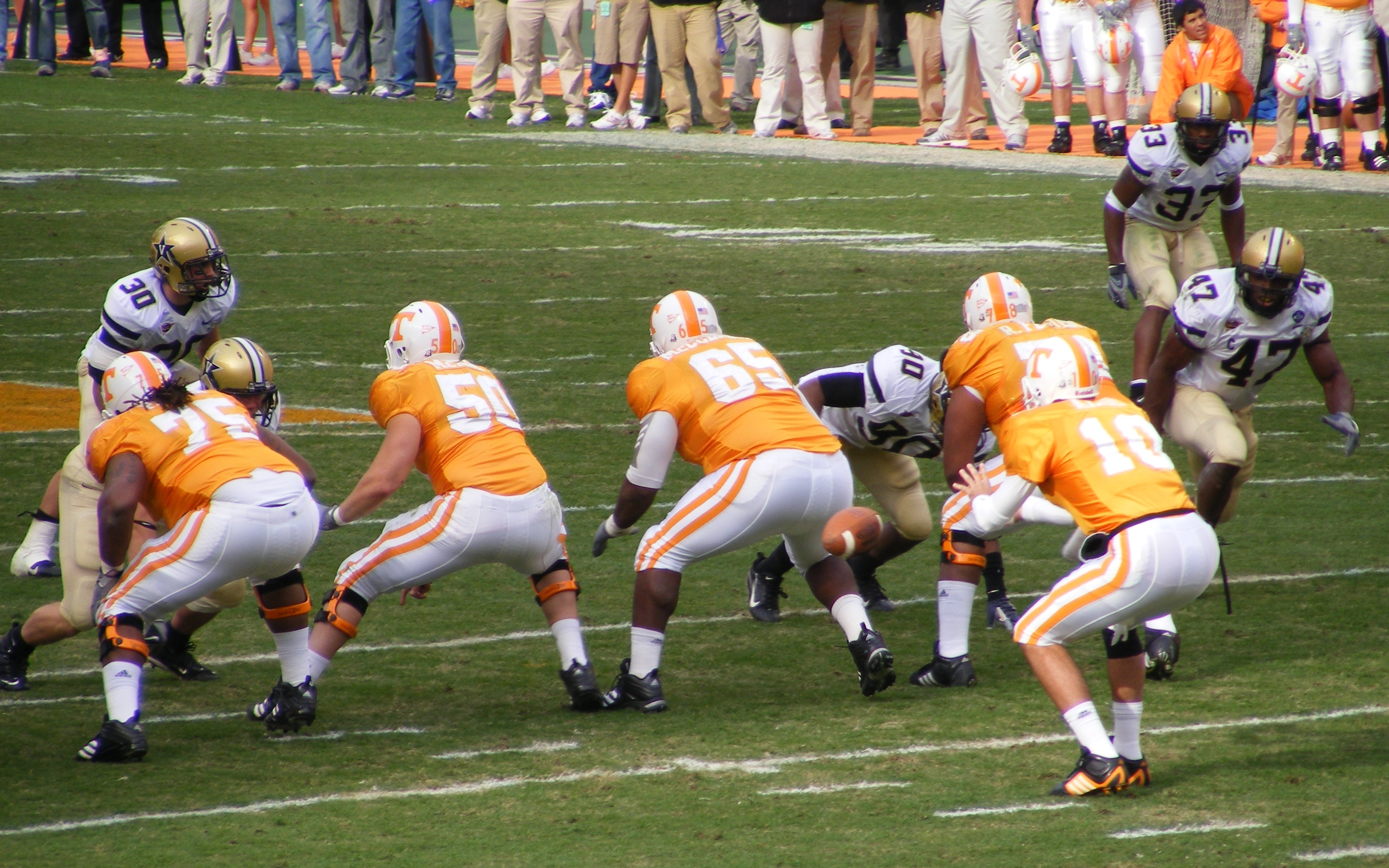
Ainge and the offense goes to work against Vanderbilt.

Tennessee fought back from a 15-point deficit in the 4th quarter to beat their in-state rivals by the score of 25–24. The issue was still to be decided with less than a minute in the game, when Vanderbilt kicker Bryant Hahnfeldt's 49-yard field goal attempt grazed the left upright and went wide left.

Tennessee started well on its opening drive, moving 75 yards on 9 plays. The Drive culminated with a 9-yard touchdown pass from Erik Ainge to Lucas Taylor. The extra point, however, was blocked, giving Tennessee a 6–0 lead. Vanderbilt answered the score and then took the lead midway through the second quarter. QB Mackenzi Adams found Brad Allen for a 5-yard touchdown pass. Tennessee regained the lead on a Daniel Lincoln field goal from 33 yards. However, Vanderbilt scored twice in the final minute of the half, first with a 19-yard touchdown pass from Adams to Jeff Jennings, and then with 33-yard field goal by Hahnfeldt. The field goal had followed a fumble by Tennessee on a lateral pass from Ainge to Foster shortly before halftime.

Vanderbilt extended its lead after halftime to 24–9 by moving down the field on an 11-play, 75-yard drive that consumed 5:54 of the game clock. The Commodores would take that lead into the 4th quarter before Tennessee awoke. Tennessee actually punted the ball back to Vanderbilt with seconds remaining in the 3rd quarter, but Commodore DE Broderick Stewart was flagged for roughing Vol punter Briton Colquitt. The Vols scored on that drive early in the 4th quarter when Ainge connected with Josh Briscoe for a 7-yard touchdown pass.

The Vol Defense held Vanderbilt to two "three and out" possessions after the Briscoe touchdown. Tennessee retook possession and drove 83 yards in less than 3 minutes, scoring a touchdown when Ainge found Austin Rogers in the end zone for a 5-yard touchdown pass. The Two-point conversion failed, and Tennessee still trailed. The Volunteer Defense once again held strong, forcing another punt after a 3 play, 4-yard drive. Tennessee took possession at the Vanderbilt 33-yard line after Freshman DB Dennis Rogan returned a punt 45 yards. The Vols moved 17 yards to set up the go ahead field goal for Daniel Lincoln. Lincoln connected from 33 yards to give Tennessee the 25–24 lead.

Vanderbilt was not finished at this point. D.J. Moore returned the ensuing kickoff 55 yards to the Tennessee 42-yard line. Vanderbilt moved the ball 11 yards (9 of which came on a pass interference penalty) to set up the field goal try by Hahnfeldt. Hahnfeldt pushed the kick left, grazing the outer half of the left upright, and giving Tennessee a 25–24 victory. The victory kept the Vols in the driver's seat for the SEC Eastern Division title. The Vols would need to win the next game against Kentucky to earn the spot in the SEC Championship Game against LSU.

=== Kentucky ===
#19 Tennessee Volunteers (8–3) at Kentucky Wildcats (7–4)

Quarter	1	2	3	4	OT	2OT	3OT	Total
Tennessee	14	10	7	0	7	6	8	52
Kentucky	0	7	14	10	7	6	6	50

at Commonwealth Stadium • Lexington, Kentucky

- Date: November 24
- TV: CBS
- College Football @ Sports-Reference.com

Game information

Tennessee

- Erik Ainge
  28/45, 397 Yds, 7 TD, 3 INT
- Arian Foster
  27 Rush, 118 Yds
- Lucas Taylor
  6 Rec, 103 Yds

Kentucky

- Andre' Woodson
  39/62, 430 Yds, 6 TD, 2 INT
- Rafael Little
  24 Rush, 77 Yds
  11 Rec, 108 Yds

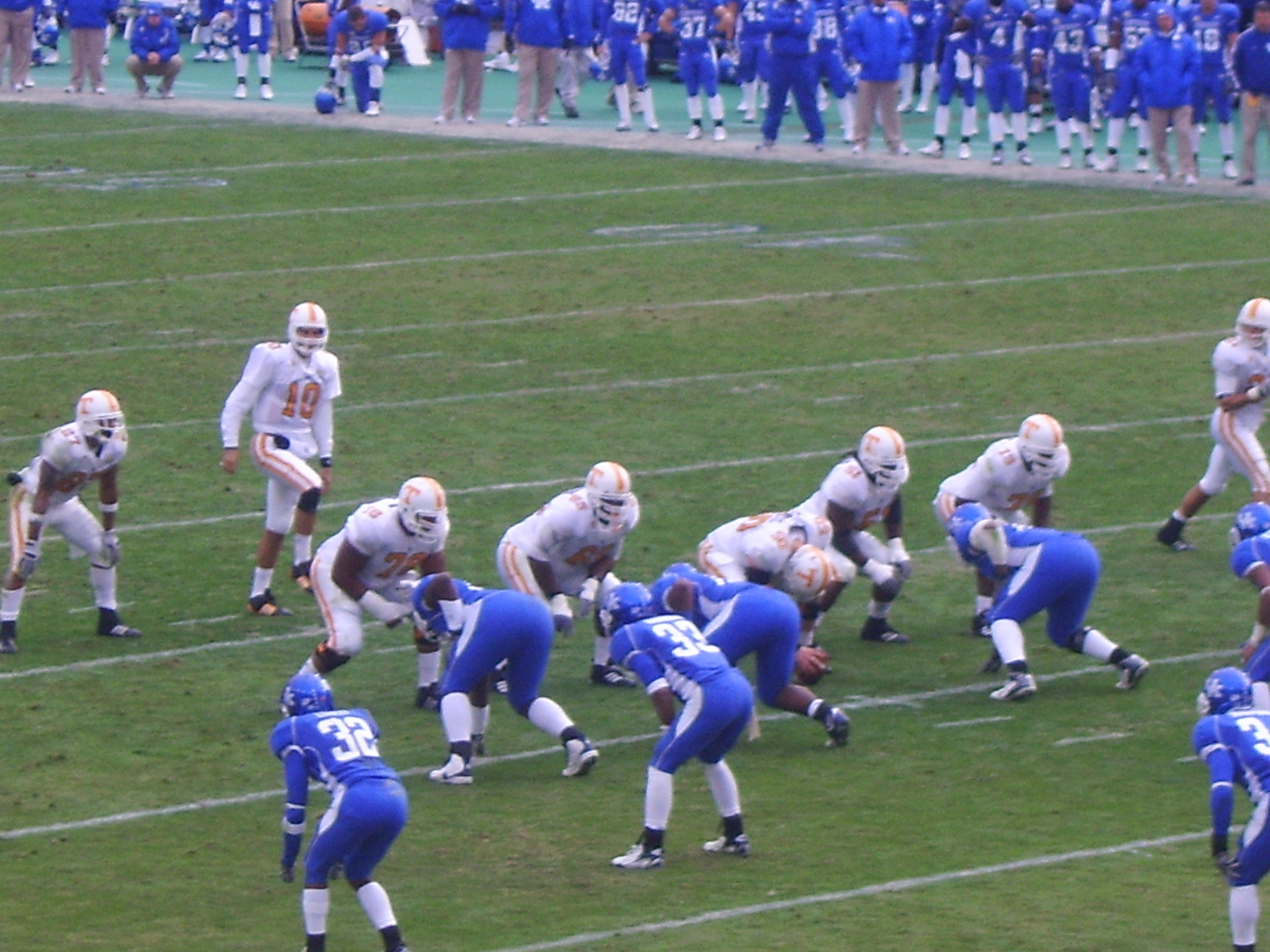
The Vols offense works from the shotgun against Kentucky.

The Volunteers (9–3, 6–2) earned a shot at LSU in the SEC title game by beating the Wildcats (7–5, 3–5) for the 23rd straight time, the longest active winning streak by one team over another in major college football.

The game started with a one-play, 65-yard touchdown for the volunteers as a pass was thrown to Arian Foster by Eric Ainge. The rest of the first half went well for the volunteers as they led 24–7 heading into the break. Ainge and the Tennessee Offense built the halftime lead with touchdown passes to Foster, WR Lucas Taylor, and WR Quintin Hancock.

The game looked to be in hand when the Vols led 31–14 near the end of the 3rd quarter following an Ainge touchdown pass to TE Jeff Cottam. However, the Wildcats fought back behind a strong second half performance by QB Andre Woodson, scoring 17 unanswered points to push the game into overtime.

The first overtime saw Kentucky score first when Woodson found Keenan Burton for an 8-yard touchdown pass. Tennessee answered with a touchdown pass of their own. Ainge connected with Gerald Jones, whose diving catch re-tied the score. In the second overtime, the game looked like it was over when Eric Ainge threw his third interception of the game. A tipped pass was corralled by Sam Maxwell, setting up Kentucky for a win with any score. However, a Kentucky 35-yard field goal attempt was blocked by Dan Williams to push the game into triple-overtime.

In the 3rd overtime, the Vols had a chance to end the game after an Austin Rogers touchdown reception, as they only needed a 2-point conversion. However Arian Foster was stopped short on an off tackle run and was also flagged for a personal foul for throwing the ball up in the air after the play was over. Kentucky had scored in the first half of that overtime period when Burton caught an 11-yard touchdown pass from Woodson. The two-point conversion failed, as Woodson's pass fell incomplete, setting up UT for the opportunity to win with a touchdown and two-point conversion. When they failed to cash in on that opportunity, Foster showed his frustration by slinging the ball, and was flagged for a 15-yard penalty.

The penalty put the Vols in a hole to begin the 4th overtime period, forcing them to start from the 40-yard line. Nevertheless, the resilient volunteers scored their final touchdown in another one-play, 40-yard drive as Ainge found Hancock wide open. The Volunteers scored the two-point conversion as well, with Ainge hitting Rogers on a quick slant. Kentucky matched the score when RB Derrick Locke ran in from the 2-yard line. Kentucky then needed to match the Vols' two-point conversion. The game-winning play came as Woodson was tackled from behind by DE Antonio Reynolds and a forced fumble was recovered by the Volunteer Defense. That play ended the 5-hour thriller with the final score: 52–50.

Scoring summary

Quarter	Time	Drive			Team	Scoring information	Score	
Quarter	Time	Plays	Yards	TOP	Team	Scoring information	TENN	UK
1	14:44	1	65	0:16	Tennessee	Arian Foster 65-yard touchdown reception from Erik Ainge, Daniel Lincoln kick good	7	0
1	4:18	4	83	1:47	Tennessee	Lucas Taylor 18-yard touchdown reception from Erik Ainge, Daniel Lincoln kick good	14	0
2	12:12	11	70	3:58	Kentucky	Stevie Johnson 17-yard touchdown reception from Andre' Woodson, Lones Seiber kick good	14	7
2	8:57	7	47	3:15	Tennessee	45-yard field goal by Daniel Lincoln	17	7
2	0:17	2	17	0:17	Tennessee	Quinn Hancock 15-yard touchdown reception from Erik Ainge, Daniel Lincoln kick good	24	7
3	9:34	14	80	5:26	Kentucky	Dicky Lyons 5-yard touchdown reception from Andre Woodson, Lones Seiber kick good	24	14
3	1:31	5	30	1:49	Tennessee	Jeff Cottam 2-yard touchdown reception from Erik Ainge, Daniel Lincoln kick good	31	14
3	0:01	6	78	1:30	Kentucky	Jacob Tamme 2-yard touchdown reception from Andre' Woodson, Lones Seiber kick good	31	21
4	6:11	8	66	2:28	Kentucky	Stevie Johnson 8-yard touchdown reception from Andre' Woodson, Lones Seiber kick good	31	28
4	0:00	18	90	3:32	Kentucky	20-yard field goal by Lones Seiber	31	31
OT		3	25		Kentucky	Keenan Burton 8-yard touchdown reception from Andre Woodson, Lones Seiber kick good	31	38
OT		5	25		Tennessee	Gerald Jones 10-yard touchdown reception from Erik Ainge, Daniel Lincoln kick good	38	38
OT2		4	25		Kentucky	Keenan Burton 11-yard touchdown reception from Andre' Woodson, 2-point pass failed	38	44
OT2					Tennessee	Austin Rogers 13-yard touchdown reception from Erik Ainge, 2-point run failed	44	44
OT3		1	40		Tennessee	Quinn Hancock 40-yard touchdown reception from Erik Ainge, 2-point pass good	52	44
OT3		4	25		Kentucky	Derrick Locke 2-yard touchdown run, 2-point run failed	52	50
"TOP" = time of possession. For other American football terms, see Glossary of American football.							52	50

=== SEC Championship Game: LSU ===
	1	2	3	4	Total
Tennessee (#14)	7	0	7	0	14
LSU (#5)	6	0	7	8	21

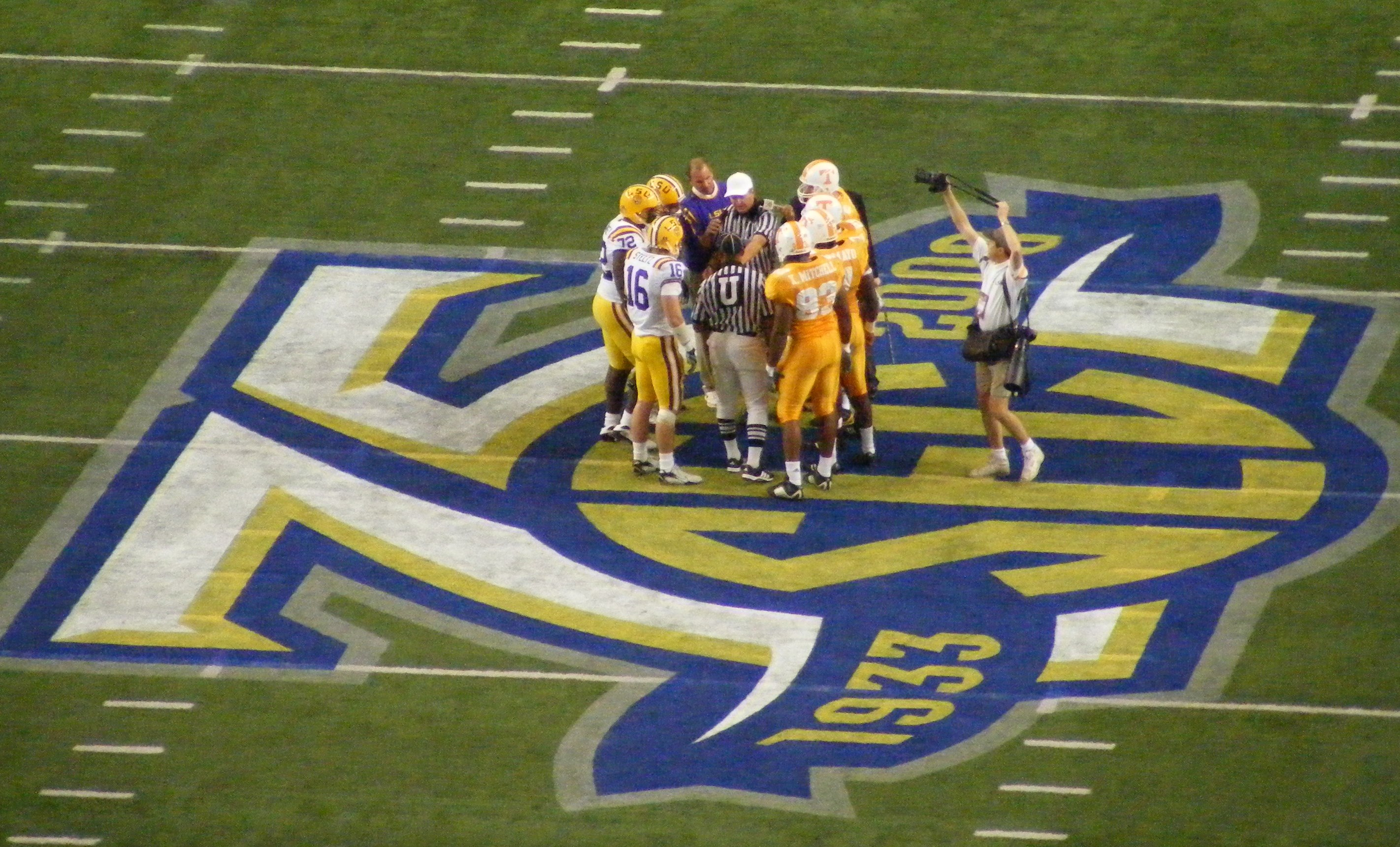
2007 SEC Championship.

Tennessee faced the LSU Tigers in its first SEC Championship Game since 2004. The teams had also faced each other in the 2001 SEC Championship game. LSU won that game over the favored Volunteers, eliminating them from a trip to the Rose Bowl for the national championship. LSU last played in the SEC title game in 2005, losing to Georgia.

This time, Tennessee led the contest for a majority of the game, before surrendering the lead following a late interception. The Vols took the opening kickoff to the 38-yard line and from there, the offense drove 62 yards for a touchdown. That drive was capped off by an 11-yard touchdown reception by Chris Brown. LSU answered in the first quarter with two Colt David field goal, to cut the deficit to 1 point. A scoreless second quarter made the halftime score 7–6.

LSU drove the field on the first possession of the second half to secure a short lived lead. Substitute QB Ryan Perriloux, filling in for injured Matt Flynn, led the Tigers on the 76-yard drive, finding WR Demetrius Byrd for the go ahead touchdown pass. The Vols missed a field goal on the following drive, but capitalized on a forced fumble to retake the lead. Ainge drove the Vols 66 yards on 9 plays and found Josh Briscoe on a pass into the endzone to move the score to 14–13.

Both Offenses stalled for the rest of the game. However, LSU found its winning score when DB Jonathan Zenon picked off an Ainge pass at the Tennessee 18-yard line and returned it for a touchdown. That fourth quarter score, combined with Perriloux's two-point conversion run gave the game its final 21–14 score. The win by LSU propelled them into the 2008 BCS National Championship Game, while Tennessee accepted a bid to the Outback Bowl to face Wisconsin.

=== Outback Bowl: Wisconsin ===
	1	2	3	4	Total
Wisconsin (#18)	7	7	3	0	17
Tennessee (#16)	7	14	0	0	21

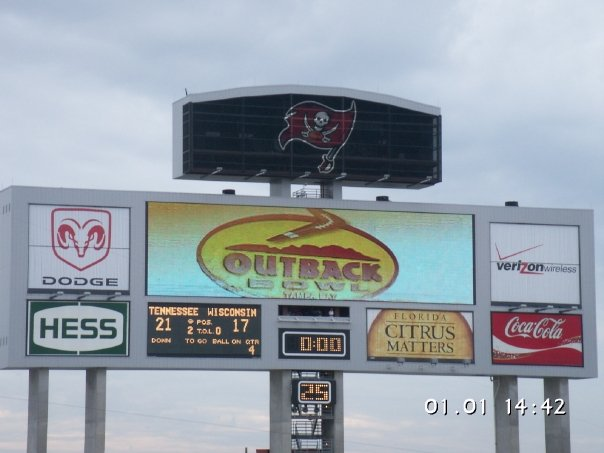
Tennessee capped off the '07 season with a 4 point victory over Wisconsin.

Despite losing 3 starters to academic suspensions, Tennessee put together a solid performance to end their season with a 21–17 victory over the Wisconsin Badgers in the 2008 Outback Bowl. WR Lucas Taylor, DT DeMonte Bolden, and LB Rico McCoy (all starters) along with reserve LB Chris Donald and reserve WR Kenny O'Neal, were declared academically ineligible for the game.

Tennessee started the day's scoring on their second possession. WR Gerald Jones, lining up at QB in the aptly named "G-Gun" formation scored on a 3-yard run to cap off a 66-yard drive. Wisconsin answered on the ensuing drive, due largely to a 60-yard kickoff return by David Gilreath and a 15-yard facemask penalty. The 22 yard scoring effort found pay dirt with QB Tyler Donovan's 6-yard run on 3rd and goal. Donovan was hit at the goal line by Eric Berry, causing a mild concussion, but not forcing Donovan to miss any time. Tennessee drove deep into Badger territory on the following drive, only to turn the ball over by fumbling a trick play. Both offenses continued to sputter until the Vols retook the lead with 9:45 to go in the 2nd quarter. Erik Ainge hooked up with WR Josh Briscoe on a 29 touchdown pass to move the score to 14–7.

The Vols forced the Badgers backwards on their next drive and then capitalized on the field position. Tennessee took at 14-point lead when Ainge found TE Brad Cottam on a 31-yard touchdown throw. The score would be the last of the game for the Vol offense. Wisconsin would answer shortly before halftime as Donovan found Andy Crooks in the end zone with 1:03 remaining in the half.

The second half was a defensive struggle. Wisconsin held Tennessee scoreless, while the Tennessee defense limited the Badger offense to 3 points. The point came on a Taylor Mehlhaff 27-yard field goal with 9 seconds remaining in the 3rd quarter. Wisconsin had a few opportunities to take the lead in the game's final period, but the Badgers fell short each time. The Vols forced an incomplete pass by Donovan on a 4th and 2 play from the Tennessee 10-yard line with 5:52 to go in the game. Wisconsin got one final chance with 1:26 to go on the clock, but that drive was ended by an Antonio Wardlow interception at the 1-yard line of Tennessee. Senior Erik Ainge took a knee is his final play as a Tennessee Volunteer to cap off the 21–17 victory. Ainge finished his career at Tennessee being named the MVP at the end of the Outback Bowl Game. Briscoe put in his best game of the season, filling in for Lucas Taylor and playing all 5 receiver positions at one point in the game. Brad Cottam showed that when healthy he can be a great player and look for him in the upcoming NFL draft.

== Team players drafted into the NFL ==
Player	Position	Round	Pick	NFL club
Jerod Mayo	Linebacker	1	10	New England Patriots
Brad Cottam	Tight end	3	76	Kansas City Chiefs
Erik Ainge	Quarterback	5	162	New York Jets
