= Jayson Swain =

American football player (born 1984)

No. 1
- Position: Wide receiver

Personal information
- Born: July 27, 1984 (age 42); Chicago, Illinois, U.S.
- Listed height: 6 ft 1 in (1.85 m)
- Listed weight: 205 lb (93 kg)

Career information
- High school: Huntsville (AL) Grissom
- College: Tennessee
- NFL draft: 2007: undrafted

Career history
- Chicago Bears (2007)*
- * Offseason or practice squad member only

Jayson Swain (born July 27, 1984) is an American former professional football wide receiver in the National Football League (NFL) and currently a host on his Radio Show Josh & Swain on 99.1 The Sports Animal Josh and Swain as well as his podcast The Swain Event which was named Best of the Best by Cityview Magazine in 2018.

== Early life ==
Swain was born in Chicago, Illinois, but attended Virgil I. Grissom High School in Huntsville, Alabama, where he was a starter for 4 years in football and 3 years in basketball. He was an All-American and played in the U.S. Army All-American Bowl. He was recruited by many major universities as a senior in high school.

== College career ==
Swain garnered rave reviews upon arriving at Tennessee in 2003. He was part of a heralded recruiting class with receivers Robert Meachem and Bret Smith. As a freshman, Jayson caught 21 passes for 285 yards and was on the Knoxville News Sentinel's All-SEC Freshman Team. Swain started five games in his sophomore and junior seasons, before becoming a full-time starter in the 2006 season. For the 2006 season, Swain had 49 catches and 688 yards receiving and 6 touchdowns. He is currently 6th all-time in UT history with 126 receptions. Swain is also 13th in career receiving yards with 1,721.

== Professional career ==
Jayson went undrafted in the 2007 NFL draft, though he was signed as a free agent by the Chicago Bears the day after.
