= 2008 Outback Bowl =

- 22nd Outback Bowl
| Wisconsin Badgers | Tennessee Volunteers |
| (9–3) | (9–4) |
| Big Ten | SEC |
| 17 | 21 |
| Head coach: Bret Bielema | Head coach: Phillip Fulmer |
| AP / Coaches / BCS; 18 / 15 / 18 | AP / Coaches / BCS; 16 / 18 / 16 |
| | 1 | 2 | 3 | 4 | Total |
|---|---|---|---|---|---|
| Wisconsin | 7 | 7 | 3 | 0 | 17 |
| Tennessee | 7 | 14 | 0 | 0 | 21 |
- Date: January 1, 2008
- Season: 2007
- Stadium: Raymond James Stadium
- Location: Tampa, Florida
- MVP: Erik Ainge (Tennessee QB)
- Favorite: Tennessee by 4
- Referee: Scott Novak (Mtn. West)
- Attendance: 60,121
- Payout: US$3 million per team

United States TV coverage
- Network: ESPN
- Announcers: Sean McDonough, Chris Spielman, and Rob Stone

The 2008 Outback Bowl, part of the 2007–08 bowl game season, was played on January 1, 2008, at Raymond James Stadium in Tampa, Florida. It was the 22nd edition of the Outback Bowl.

== Summary ==
The opposing teams were the Wisconsin Badgers of the Big Ten Conference, and the Tennessee Volunteers of the Southeastern Conference (SEC). The Volunteers were runners-up in the SEC, having lost to LSU, 21–14, in the SEC Championship Game in Atlanta on December 1. The Badgers were trying for a second straight 10-win season under head coach Bret Bielema. During the first half of the game, the inaugural Joe Montana Award, signifying the nation's top high school quarterback, was awarded to Matt Barkley of Mater Dei High School in Santa Ana, California.

Tennessee won, 21–17. Wisconsin had a chance to win the game in the final minute, but Wisconsin quarterback Tyler Donovan was intercepted on a desperation pass, sealing a Volunteers win. Game MVP Erik Ainge completed 25 of his 43 passes for 365 yards and two touchdowns. Wisconsin running back P.J. Hill ran the ball 16 times for 132 yards.

=== Scoring ===
1 TEN TD 3 yd run by Gerald Jones (Daniel Lincoln Kick good) 7–0 TEN

1 WIS TD 6 yd run by Tyler Donovan (Taylor Mehlhaff Kick good) 7–7 Tie

2 TEN TD Josh Briscoe 29 yd pass from Erik Ainge (Lincoln Kick) 14–7 TEN

2 TEN TD Brad Cottam 31 yd pass from Erik Ainge (Lincoln kick) 21–7 TEN

2 WIS TD Andy Crooks 4 yd pass from Tyler Donovan (Mehlhaff Kick) 21–14 TEN

3 WIS FG Taylor Mehlhaff 27 yards 21–17 TEN

=== Aftermath ===
This would prove to be Tennessee coach Phillip Fulmer's final bowl game with the Vols, as the following season, he would resign as head coach.
