= Erik Ainge =

American football player (born 1986)

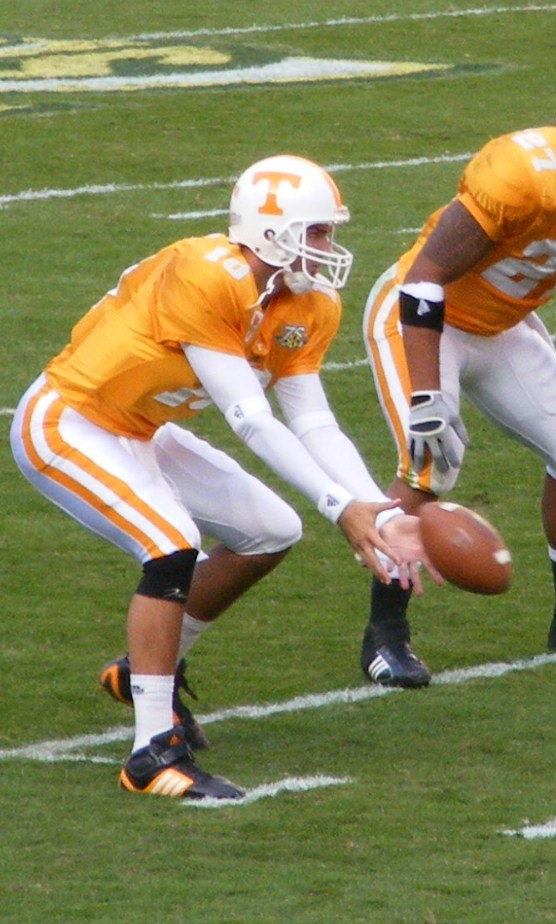
- Ainge with the Tennessee Volunteers in 2007

No. 9, 10
- Position: Quarterback

Personal information
- Born: June 12, 1986 (age 40); Portland, Oregon, U.S.
- Listed height: 6 ft 5 in (1.96 m)
- Listed weight: 221 lb (100 kg)

Career information
- High school: Glencoe (Hillsboro, Oregon)
- College: Tennessee (2004–2007)
- NFL draft: 2008: 5th round, 162nd overall pick

Career history
- New York Jets (2008–2010)
- Stats at Pro Football Reference

Erik Douglas Ainge (born June 12, 1986) is an American former football quarterback. He played college football for the Tennessee Volunteers. He was selected by the New York Jets in the fifth round of the 2008 NFL draft but never played in an NFL game. Ainge currently hosts a daily sports talk show in Knoxville, Tennessee, on Sports Radio WNML 990 AM and 99.1 FM from 9a-12n EST.

He is the nephew of former NBA and MLB player Danny Ainge, who is currently an executive with the Utah Jazz.

== Early life ==
Ainge was born in Portland, Oregon. He was raised just outside Portland in Hillsboro, Oregon, where he was a star athlete at Glencoe High School. As a freshman and sophomore, he played baseball and basketball in addition to football. Ainge was the starting pitcher on his baseball team and was said to throw a 90 mph fastball. He also averaged 17 points, eight rebounds, and three assists in basketball as a junior, and as a senior was a preseason honorable mention on the Street & Smith's All-American team.

Ainge was a two-year starter at quarterback on the football team, leading the Glencoe Crimson Tide as deep as the Oregon state quarterfinals. As a junior, he passed for 2,559 yards and 16 touchdowns. As a senior, he passed for 3,078 yards, 24 touchdowns and eight interceptions. Perhaps his most impressive game as a senior came against Aloha High School, when he passed for 475 yards, five touchdowns, and no interceptions to lead the Crimson Tide to 62 points through three quarters of action. Following his senior season, Ainge was named all-state, prep star all-American, and the 2003 Oregon Gatorade Player of the Year. During his senior season, Ainge also became one of the most highly recruited quarterbacks on the west coast receiving offers from schools like Oregon, Arizona State, UCLA, and Tennessee. He eventually signed with the University of Tennessee to play college football under head coach Phillip Fulmer.

== College career ==
=== 2004 season ===
As a freshman at Tennessee in 2004, Ainge completed 109-of-198 passes for 1,452 yards, 17 touchdowns, and nine interceptions. His 17 touchdowns broke Peyton Manning's freshman touchdown record of 15, and his 1,452 passing yards ranked second behind Casey Clausen's freshman record of 1,473. On September 5, he made his collegiate debut in the season opener against UNLV. In the 42–17 victory, he had 118 passing yards and two passing touchdowns. In the Volunteers' 30–28 win over rival Florida, Ainge led a fourth quarter touchdown drive that pulled the Vols' to within a point, and then engineered a short drive in the closing seconds to set up James Wilhoit's game-winning 50-yard field goal. Ainge split time for much of the year with Brent Schaeffer, who later transferred to Ole Miss. After an injury just before halftime against Notre Dame, Ainge was replaced by former Tennessee quarterback Casey Clausen's brother Rick.

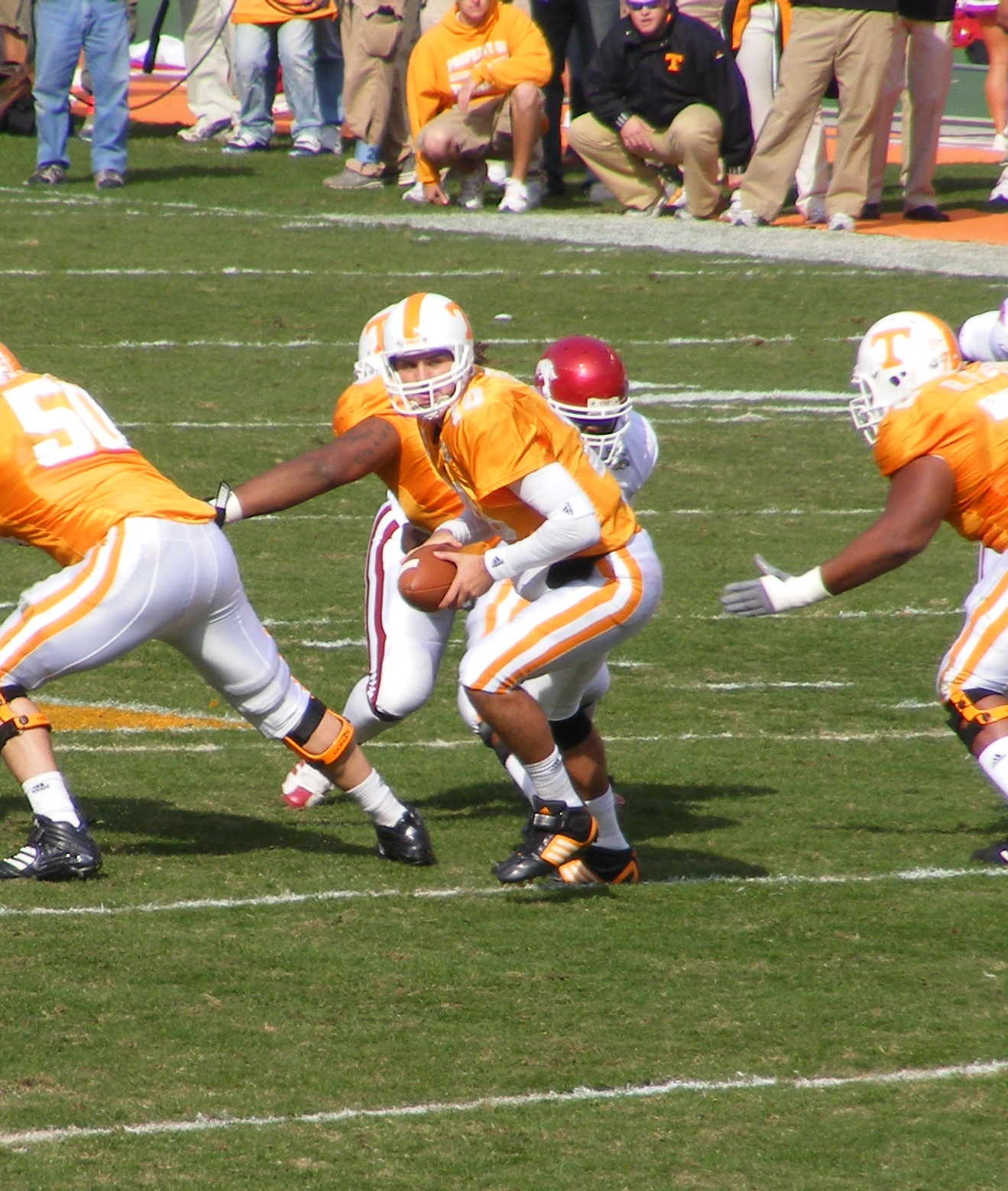
Ainge during a game against the Arkansas Razorbacks at Neyland Stadium

=== 2005 season ===
During his sophomore season in 2005, Ainge completed 66-of-145 passes for 737 yards, five touchdowns, and seven interceptions, in just eight games. One of his most infamous moments came in the Vols' game against LSU. To avoid getting sacked in the end zone by safety LaRon Landry, Ainge flung the ball up into the air just before he was ruled down for a safety. Ainge's head also hit the goalpost on the play, tweaking his neck. As a result, Clausen again took over. Ainge finished his sophomore season with a strong performance and a 27–8 win at Kentucky as the Vols finished with a 5–6 record.

=== 2006 season ===
As a junior in 2006, Ainge was named the starter heading into spring practice, and for the first time in his career was able to take all of the first team reps throughout the preseason. Ainge also had a new position coach when David Cutcliffe replaced Randy Sanders as Tennessee's offensive coordinator. In the season opener against #9 California, he had 291 passing yards, four passing touchdowns, and one interception in the 35–18 victory. In the Vols' 31–30 win over Air Force, he completed 15 consecutive passes, the second-most in school history (Tee Martin completed 24 consecutive passes in 1998). He finished the day with 333 passing yards, three passing touchdowns, and one interception. After the Air Force game, he had 183 passing yards and two interceptions in a narrow 21–20 loss to the Florida Gators. On September 30, against Memphis, he had 324 passing yards and four passing touchdowns in the 41–7 victory. He led his team to a 7–1 record before being injured in the closing minutes of the game against South Carolina. His 84-yard pass to wide receiver Robert Meachem in Tennessee's win over Memphis is tied for the fifth-longest pass play in school history. Ainge missed the majority of Tennessee's two losses following the South Carolina game before returning to lead his team to season-ending wins against Vanderbilt and Kentucky. During the season, Ainge set career highs in most statistical categories and break the Tennessee single-season record for completion percentage. The 2007 Outback Bowl was the first bowl appearance for Ainge, as he had missed the 2005 Cotton Bowl Classic due to injury, and the Vols did not qualify for a bowl game following his sophomore season. In the game, the Vols fell to Penn State. For the year, Ainge completed 233 of 348 passes for 2,989 yards, 19 touchdowns, and nine interceptions.

=== 2007 season ===
In March 2007, Ainge underwent surgery for a torn meniscus. He stated that the injury occurred during weightlifting exercises. However, he was able to recover in time for the 2007 season.

As a senior in 2007, Ainge completed 325-of-519 passes for 3,522 yards, 31 touchdowns, and 10 interceptions. Despite 519 pass attempts, he was only sacked three times. He completed 62.6% of his passes and had a 135.48 QB rating. Ainge was able to achieve this success despite nagging injuries which hampered him all season, including a broken pinky finger on his throwing hand and a shoulder injury on his throwing arm.

In the season opener against the #12 California Golden Bears, he had 271 passing yards and three passing touchdowns in the 45–31 defeat. On September 22, against Arkansas State, he had 334 passing yards, four passing touchdowns, and one interception in the 48–27 victory to pull Tennessee to a 2–2 record. In the next game, a 35–14 victory over #12 rival Georgia, he was 17-of-22 for 165 passing yards. Over the course of the season, Ainge helped lead the Vols to an 8–3 record going into the regular season finale. The strongest statistical game for Ainge was a 52–50 triple-overtime win over Kentucky in which he threw for 397 yards and an SEC-record seven touchdowns. The Vols finished with a 9–3 record and won the SEC East to earn an appearance in the SEC Championship Game. In the 21–14 loss to LSU, he had 249 passing yards, two passing touchdowns, and two interceptions, including a pick-six in the fourth quarter. Despite the loss, the Vols qualified for the Outback Bowl. In the Vols' win over Wisconsin in the 2008 Outback Bowl, Ainge threw for 365 yards and two touchdowns, and was named the game's MVP.

During his four years at Tennessee, Ainge completed 733-of-1,210 passes for 8,700 yards, 72 touchdowns, and 35 interceptions. His seven touchdown passes against Kentucky in 2007 remains an SEC single-game record. His 325 completions in 2007 remains a school single-season record, and his total yardage in 2007 trails only Manning's 1997 tally of 3,789 yards for the school single-season record. His total career yardage is the third-most in school history only behind Manning (11,020) and Casey Clausen (9,577).

=== College statistics ===
Year	Team	Games			Passing								Rushing			
Year	Team	GP	GS	Record	Cmp	Att	Pct	Yds	Avg	TD	Int	Rtg	Att	Yds	Avg	TD
2004	Tennessee	9	6	4–2	109	198	55.1	1,452	7.3	17	9	135.9	16	-29	-1.8	0
2005	Tennessee	8	5	4–1	66	145	45.5	737	5.1	5	7	89.9	24	−64	−2.7	0
2006	Tennessee	12	12	9–3	233	348	67.0	2,989	8.6	19	9	151.9	26	−102	−3.9	1
2007	Tennessee	14	14	10–4	325	519	62.6	3,522	6.8	31	10	135.5	16	−32	−2.0	0
Career		43	37	27–10	733	1,210	60.6	8,700	7.2	72	35	134.8	82	-227	-2.8	1

=== Awards and honors ===
- Rivals.com National Freshman of the Week, September 18, 2004 (vs. Florida)
- 2004 Freshman All-America The Sporting News (2nd)
- SEC Offensive Freshman of the Year The Sporting News
- Freshman All-SEC Coaches
- 2005 Academic All-SEC
- USA Today National Player of the Week, September 4, 2006 (vs. California)
- SEC Offensive Player of the Week, September 11, 2006 (vs. Air Force)
- SEC Offensive Player of the Week, October 2, 2006 (at Memphis)
- SEC Offensive Player of the Week, October 9, 2006 (at Georgia)
- Cingular All-America Player of the Week, October 9, 2006 (at Georgia)
- Walter Camp Div. I-A National Offensive Player of the Week, October 9, 2006 (at Georgia)
- 2008 Outback Bowl MVP
- 2008 Senior Bowl Selection

== Professional career ==
Pre-draft measurables
Height	Weight	Arm length	Hand span	40-yard dash	10-yard split	20-yard split	20-yard shuttle	Three-cone drill	Vertical jump	Broad jump
6 ft 5 1/2 in (1.97 m)	225 lb (102 kg)	33 1/4 in (0.84 m)	9 1/8 in (0.23 m)	4.98 s	1.71 s	2.86 s	4.60 s	7.51 s	21.5 in (0.55 m)	9 ft 0 in (2.74 m)
All values from NFL Combine

Ainge was selected in the fifth round of the 2008 NFL draft by the New York Jets with the 162nd overall pick. In May 2008, Ainge underwent surgery on the little finger on his throwing hand. On July 16, he signed a four-year, $1.87 million contract with a $165,000 signing bonus.

On November 21, 2008, Ainge was suspended four games by the NFL for violating the league's policy on steroids and related substances. Ainge, already on injured reserve and out for the season with a foot injury, was not allowed to be with the team or visit the team facility during the suspension. He was able to rejoin the team on December 15, 2008, following the New York Jets' game against the Buffalo Bills.

Ainge was expected to compete with Kellen Clemens and Kevin O'Connell for the final quarterback roster spot on the team in 2010. It was later announced that Ainge had entered "a drug treatment/rehab facility for 'recreational issues'," marking the second time he had violated the NFL's substance abuse policy.

Ainge made an announcement to The Associated Press on June 23, 2011, stating that he would retire from the NFL due to injuries sustained to his throwing shoulder and right foot. The Jets officially released Ainge on July 29, 2011.

== Radio ==
On January 3, 2017, The Erik Ainge Show debuted on FM 99.1 Sports Radio WNML in Knoxville, TN. Ainge is joined every morning by Brian Rice at 9:00 AM EST.

== Personal life ==
In a first person account written for ESPN.com in March 2011, Ainge admitted that he struggled with drug and alcohol abuse from the time he was twelve years old, and by his senior year at Tennessee he had become addicted to pain killers. Ainge continued to struggle with these issues in the NFL before seeking help. He also suffers from rapid cycling bipolar disorder, for which he has been treated in addition to his drug and alcohol treatment.
