= 2007 Outback Bowl =

- 21st Outback Bowl
- 2007 Outback Bowl logo
Tennessee Volunteers	Penn State Nittany Lions
(9–3)	(8–4)
SEC	Big Ten
10	20
Head coach: Phillip Fulmer	Head coach: Joe Paterno
AP / Coaches / BCS; 17 / 18 / 17
	1	2	3	4	Total
Tennessee	3	7	0	0	10
Penn State	0	10	0	10	20
- Date: January 1, 2007
- Season: 2006
- Stadium: Raymond James Stadium
- Location: Tampa, Florida
- MVP: Tony Hunt (Penn State RB)
- National anthem: Charlie Daniels
- Referee: Jerry McGinn (Big East)
- Halftime show: University of Tennessee and Penn State University bands, 2007 National Outback Bowl Mass Band Show
- Attendance: 65,601

United States TV coverage
- Network: ESPN
- Announcers: Mike Patrick, Todd Blackledge and Holly Rowe

The 2007 Outback Bowl Game was a college football bowl game played on January 1, 2007, at Raymond James Stadium in Tampa, Florida. It was part of the 2006–2007 bowl game season that concluded the 2006 NCAA Division I FBS football season. This was the 21st edition of the bowl game originally known as the Hall of Fame Bowl, later rebranded as the Outback Bowl through sponsorship from Outback Steakhouse. The game pitted the 18th-ranked Tennessee Volunteers against the unranked Penn State Nittany Lions and was televised on ESPN.

== Scoring summary ==
=== First quarter ===
- Tennessee James Wilhoit II 44-yard field goal. (4:58) 3–0 Tennessee

=== Second quarter ===
- Penn State Kevin Kelly 34-yard field goal. (11:43) 3–3 Tie
- Penn State Andrew Quarless 2-yard touchdown pass from Anthony Morelli (Kelly kick good). (3:30) 10–3 Penn State
- Tennessee LaMarcus Coker 42-yard touchdown run (Wilhoit kick good). (1:15) 10–10 Tie

=== Third quarter ===
- No scoring plays.

=== Fourth quarter ===
- Penn State Tony Davis 88-yard fumble return for touchdown (Kelly kick good). (10:01) 17–10 Penn State
- Penn State Kevin Kelly 22-yard field goal. (3:29) 20–10 Penn State
