= Robert Meachem =

American football player (born 1984)

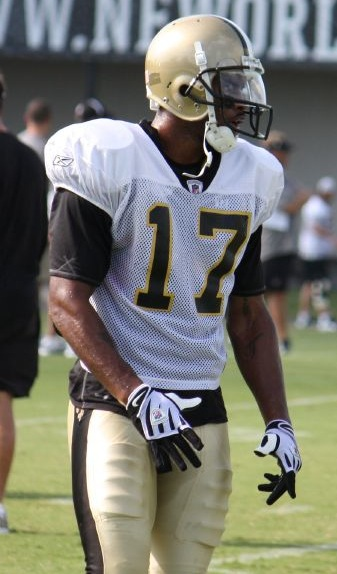
- Meachem with the New Orleans Saints in 2009

No. 12, 17
- Position: Wide receiver

Personal information
- Born: September 28, 1984 (age 42); Tulsa, Oklahoma, U.S.
- Listed height: 6 ft 2 in (1.88 m)
- Listed weight: 215 lb (98 kg)

Career information
- High school: Booker T. Washington (Tulsa)
- College: Tennessee (2003–2006)
- NFL draft: 2007: 1st round, 27th overall pick

Career history

Playing
- New Orleans Saints (2007–2011); San Diego Chargers (2012); New Orleans Saints (2013–2014); Richmond Roughriders (2018)

Coaching
- De La Salle High School (New Orleans) Wide receivers coach (2019–present)

Awards and highlights
- Super Bowl champion (XLIV); First-team All-American (2006); First-team All-SEC (2006)

Career NFL statistics
- Receptions: 178
- Receiving yards: 2,914
- Receiving touchdowns: 27
- Stats at Pro Football Reference

Robert Emery Meachem (born September 28, 1984) is an American former professional football player who was a wide receiver in the National Football League (NFL), primarily with the New Orleans Saints. He played college football for the Tennessee Volunteers, earning first-team All-American honors in 2006. Meachem was selected by New Orleans in the first round of the 2007 NFL draft with the 27th overall pick. He also played one season with the San Diego Chargers.

== Early life ==
Raised in Tulsa, Oklahoma, Meachem played football in elementary school for the "Mabee Babies" of The Salvation Army North Mabee Boys & Girls Club. He won a national basketball title in the summer after eighth grade with his AAU team, the Tulsa Jammers. He later attended Booker T. Washington High School, where he was a teammate of future NFL players Felix Jones and Mark Anderson, and was named a high school All-American by Parade and SuperPrep reporting services. Meachem was also a point guard on his high school basketball team, which won back to back state titles in 2001 and 2002.

== College career ==
Meachem attended the University of Tennessee, arriving in 2003. He was part of a heralded recruiting class with receivers Jayson Swain and Bret Smith. Meachem, however, redshirted the 2003 season after suffering a knee injury in preseason practice.

Meachem caught 25 passes for 459 in 2004 as a redshirt freshman. He returned to play in all 13 games (no starts) and led the team with 459 yards on 25 catches (18.4 average) and four touchdowns. Meachem was the only Vols receiver with 100 yards in a game that year. Meachem's first career reception occurred in the game against UNLV, which was a 35-yard touchdown.

Meachem appeared in all 11 games in 2005, with two starts, and again led the team in receiving yards with 383 on 29 catches (13.2 average) and two touchdowns.

2006 was Meachem's breakout year. Along with David Cutcliffe's return to Tennessee as offensive coordinator in 2006, Meachem, Swain and quarterback Erik Ainge all turned in career seasons. In the November 25 game against Kentucky, Meachem had 116 receiving yards, pushing his total to a new school record of 1,265 yards in a single season. Meachem also totaled 11 scores, a career best. He also had six 100-yard games that season. He ranked fourth in the nation with an average of 99.85 yards per game receiving and ranked 24th nationally with 5.46 receptions per game. He led the team with a career-high 71 catches for a school single-season record 1,298 yards (18.3 avg) to lead the SEC, including 11 touchdowns. He recorded two solo tackles, gained 16 yards on a kickoff return and 12 yards on a punt return. In 37 games at Tennessee, Meachem started 15 times. He caught 125 passes and became the sixth player in school history to gain more than 2,000 yards receiving, totaling 2,140 yards (17.1 avg) with 17 touchdowns. All this earned him an all SEC, consensus All-American selections. Meachem decided to forgo his senior season and enter the 2007 NFL draft.

== Professional career ==
Pre-draft measurables
| Height | Weight | Arm length | Hand span | 40-yard dash | 10-yard split | 20-yard split | 20-yard shuttle | Three-cone drill | Vertical jump | Broad jump |
|---|---|---|---|---|---|---|---|---|---|---|
| 6 ft 2 in (1.88 m) | 214 lb (97 kg) | 32 1/4 in (0.82 m) | 9 3/8 in (0.24 m) | 4.41 s | 1.49 s | 2.52 s | 4.19 s | 6.97 s | 37.5 in (0.95 m) | 10 ft 8 in (3.25 m) |
All values taken from NFL Scouting Combine/Pro Day

=== New Orleans Saints (first stint) ===
With the 27th pick in the first round of the 2007 NFL draft, Meachem was selected by the New Orleans Saints. Meachem signed a five-year deal worth $11.3 million in base salary and incentives with $5.71 million guaranteed. However, Meachem underwent knee surgery and was unable to play in his rookie season.

Meachem was once again inactive for the Saints' opener against the Tampa Bay Buccaneers in 2008. On September 14, 2008, Meachem caught his first pass in the NFL, a 19-yard touchdown pass against the Washington Redskins.

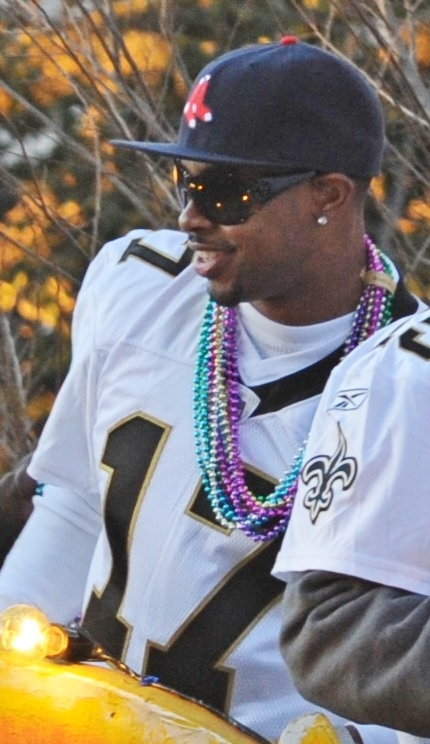
Meachem at the Saints' Super Bowl XLIV victory parade in Downtown New Orleans

In week 4 against the San Francisco 49ers, Meachem got the chance to see more game time when number 1 receiver Marques Colston was sidelined with a broken thumb. In this game, Meachem had only 2 receptions, his first a 47-yard touchdown grab, his second a 52-yard flea flicker catch with a defender draped all over him. Meachem ended week 4 with 2 receptions for 99 yards and the Saints got the win over the 49ers. Meachem finished the season with 12 receptions for 289 yards and 3 touchdowns. He also had a 24.1 yards per catch.

On December 6, 2009, after Kareem Moore of the Redskins intercepted Drew Brees, Meachem tore the ball out of Moore's grasp and ran it for a touchdown. In the same game, Meachem caught a 53-yard touchdown pass with 1:19 left in regulation, tying the game at 30. The Saints won, 33–30, in overtime to improve to 12–0. He had a career-high 142 receiving yards in the game. The 2009 Saints went on to win Super Bowl XLIV.

In the 2010 season, Meachem had 44 receptions for 638 yards and five touchdowns in 16 games and seven starts. Meachem remained with the Saints through the 2011 season. In Week 13 of the 2011 season, he had three receptions for 119 yards and a touchdown against the Lions. During his five years with the team he had 141 regular-season catches for 2,269 yards and 23 touchdowns; he also played in six playoff games and had 14 receptions for 184 yards and a touchdown.

=== San Diego Chargers ===
On March 13, 2012, Meachem signed a four-year contract with the San Diego Chargers worth $25.5 million including a $7.5 million signing bonus. He was part of the Chargers' plan to replace Pro Bowl receiver Vincent Jackson, who left the team as a free agent. Meachem caught two touchdowns in a 2012 matchup with New Orleans, but he dropped a potential touchdown in a 7–6 loss to the Cleveland Browns. His time with the Chargers was disappointing, as he underperformed the high expectations reflected in his large contract, and was compared to a previous Chargers free agent "bust", David Boston. Kevin Acee of UT-San Diego called him "the worst free agent acquisition in the history of the Chargers". On September 1, 2013, the Chargers released Meachem during final roster cuts, even though they had guaranteed him $5 million for the upcoming 2013 season.

=== New Orleans Saints (second stint) ===
On September 3, 2013, Meachem signed a one-year contract to return to the Saints. In the 2013 season, he recorded 16 receptions, 324 yards, and two touchdowns. The Saints signed him to another one-year contract on April 18, 2014. Meachem was among the last cuts made by the Saints before the 2014 season. However, a few days later, he re-signed with the team, on September 3, 2014, after rookie Khairi Fortt was placed on short-term injured reserve. He finished the 2014 season with seven receptions for 114 yards in 11 games and two starts. His contract expired after the 2014 season and he did not re-sign, making him a free agent. He missed the entire 2015 season as a free agent.

On June 14, 2016, he tried out for the Saints at minicamp wearing the number 12 on his jersey. It was last worn by Marques Colston for 10 years. The tryout was put on hold the following day as Meachem had a foot injury and didn't practice.

=== Richmond Roughriders ===
Meachem signed with the Richmond Roughriders of the American Arena League in 2018.

=== NFL statistics ===
| Year | Team | Games | Receptions | Targets | Yards | Yards per reception | Longest reception | Touchdowns | First downs | Fumbles | Fumbles lost |
|---|---|---|---|---|---|---|---|---|---|---|---|
| 2008 | NO | 14 | 12 | 20 | 289 | 24.1 | 74 | 3 | 8 | 0 | 0 |
| 2009 | NO | 16 | 45 | 64 | 722 | 16.0 | 54 | 9 | 30 | 2 | 1 |
| 2010 | NO | 16 | 44 | 66 | 638 | 14.5 | 55 | 5 | 27 | 0 | 0 |
| 2011 | NO | 16 | 40 | 61 | 620 | 15.5 | 67 | 6 | 29 | 0 | 0 |
| 2012 | SD | 15 | 14 | 32 | 207 | 14.8 | 46 | 2 | 8 | 0 | 0 |
| 2013 | NO | 15 | 16 | 30 | 324 | 20.3 | 60 | 2 | 9 | 0 | 0 |
| 2014 | NO | 11 | 7 | 20 | 114 | 16.3 | 25 | 0 | 7 | 0 | 0 |
| Career | | 103 | 178 | 293 | 2,914 | 16.4 | 74 | 27 | 118 | 2 | 1 |

== Personal life ==
Meachem was a contestant on NBC's Minute to Win It in an online exclusive episode playing to win money for the Boys and Girls Club of Greater New Orleans.

Meachem created the Robert Emery Meachem Follow Your Dreams Foundation to help American youth. Its first goal is to supply books to at least 200 kids ages 4 to 17 in north Tulsa.

On February 14, 2017, Meachem was jailed for 30 days for having more than $400,000 in unpaid child support.

In 2018, Meachem was a player in Your Call Football, an interactive game where in real time, participants call plays live for players which include former professional football players.
