= Turk McBride =

American football player (born 1985)

No. 90, 67, 75
- Position: Defensive end

Personal information
- Born: May 30, 1985 (age 41); Camden, New Jersey, U.S.
- Listed height: 6 ft 2 in (1.88 m)
- Listed weight: 278 lb (126 kg)

Career information
- High school: Wilson (Camden)
- College: Tennessee
- NFL draft: 2007: 2nd round, 54th overall pick

Career history
- Kansas City Chiefs (2007–2009); Detroit Lions (2009–2010); New Orleans Saints (2011–2012); Chicago Bears (2013)*
- * Offseason or practice squad member only

Awards and highlights
- First-team All-SEC (2006)

Career NFL statistics
- Total tackles: 125
- Sacks: 9.5
- Forced fumbles: 6
- Fumble recoveries: 3
- Stats at Pro Football Reference

Claude Maurice "Turk" McBride (born May 30, 1985) is an American former professional football player who was a defensive end in the National Football League (NFL). He was selected by the Kansas City Chiefs in the second round of the 2007 NFL draft. He played college football for the Tennessee Volunteers.

He was also a member of the Detroit Lions, New Orleans Saints and Chicago Bears.

== Early life ==
McBride attended Woodrow Wilson High School in Camden, New Jersey, where he played football for his uncle, Mike McBride and graduated in 2003. He was a four-year starter at wide receiver and a 2-year starter at defensive end. Following his senior season, McBride was named an All-American by Parade and SuperPrep. McBride also was named All-State, All-Area, All-Group 3, All-Conference and All-South for his respective areas. He set the school record for sacks in his senior year at Woodrow Wilson.

== College career ==
McBride divided his time between the defensive tackle and defensive end position at Tennessee. He started four games his sophomore season and the entire season his senior year. He was named the SEC defensive lineman of the week once in 2004 and once in 2006. Following the 2006 season, McBride was named to the Sporting News All SEC team.

== Professional career ==
Pre-draft measurables
Height	Weight	Arm length	Hand span	40-yard dash	10-yard split	20-yard split	20-yard shuttle	Three-cone drill	Vertical jump	Broad jump	Bench press
6 ft 2 3/8 in (1.89 m)	277 lb (126 kg)	33 in (0.84 m)	9 3/4 in (0.25 m)	4.83 s	1.69 s	2.80 s	4.12 s	7.10 s	31.0 in (0.79 m)	9 ft 0 in (2.74 m)	30 reps
All values from NFL Combine/Pro Day

=== Kansas City Chiefs ===
McBride was selected by the Kansas City Chiefs in the 2007 NFL Draft in the second round with the 54th overall pick. He signed a three-year contract with the team on July 24, 2007. He was featured in HBO's Hard Knocks in 2007. As a rookie, he appeared in 16 games and started one. He spent most of the 2008 season on injured reserve. The Chiefs waived McBride on September 15, 2009.

=== Detroit Lions ===
McBride was claimed off waivers by the Detroit Lions in September 2009.

=== New Orleans Saints ===
After the 2010 season, he became a free agent and on July 31, 2011, he signed with the New Orleans Saints. Before the 2012 season, he re-signed with the team.

=== Chicago Bears ===
On March 20, 2013, he signed a one-year deal with the Chicago Bears. On July 29, 2013, McBride suffered a ruptured Achilles tendon during training camp and was out for the entire 2013 season. He was released with an injury settlement on July 31.

== NFL career statistics ==
Legend
**Bold**	Career high

Year	Team	Games		Tackles					Interceptions					Fumbles			
Year	Team	GP	GS	Cmb	Solo	Ast	Sck	TFL	Int	Yds	TD	Lng	PD	FF	FR	Yds	TD
2007	KAN	**16**	1	14	11	3	1.0	0	0	0	0	0	**1**	0	0	0	0
2008	KAN	9	**9**	**41**	**25**	16	0.0	**6**	0	0	0	0	0	1	**2**	0	0
2009	DET	11	4	27	17	10	1.5	2	0	0	0	0	0	1	0	0	0
2010	DET	15	8	33	16	**17**	**5.0**	4	0	0	0	0	0	**3**	1	0	0
2011	NOR	8	2	4	3	1	2.0	1	0	0	0	0	0	1	0	0	0
2012	NOR	7	0	6	6	0	0.0	0	0	0	0	0	**1**	0	0	0	0
Career		66	24	125	78	47	9.5	13	0	0	0	0	2	6	3	0	0
