= Bret Smith =

American football player (born 1985)

No. 9
- Position: Wide receiver

Personal information
- Born: January 14, 1985 (age 41); Little Rock, Arkansas, U.S.
- Listed height: 6 ft 2 in (1.88 m)
- Listed weight: 195 lb (88 kg)

Career information
- High school: Warren
- College: Tennessee
- NFL draft: 2008: undrafted

Career history
- Dallas Desperados (2008)*; Arkansas Diamonds (2010); Kansas City Command (2011–2012)
- * Offseason or practice squad member only

Career AFL statistics
- Receptions: 206
- Receiving yards: 2,449
- Receiving touchdowns: 46
- Stats at ArenaFan.com

Bret Smith (born January 14, 1985) is an American former football wide receiver. He played college football at Tennessee.

== High school ==
Smith attended Warren High School. He was named a high school All-American by Parade and SuperPrep reporting services. Smith played in the U.S. Army All-American Bowl and won two high school state championships.

== College ==
Smith caught 18 passes for 291 in 2004 and caught 21 passes for 223 yards in 2005. His production increased in 2006. David Cutcliffe returned to Tennessee as offensive coordinator in 2006. With his return, Meachem, Swain, Smith and quarterback Erik Ainge all had career seasons. Smith finished the 2006 season with 35 receptions for 405 yards in 10 games but his college career ended with him being ruled academically ineligible for the Outback Bowl against Penn State.

== Professional career ==
=== Dallas Desperdaos ===
Smith spent 2008 on the practice squad of the Arena Football League's Dallas Desperados. However, was released on June 30, 2008 along with Damarius Bilbo, Adrian Gonzalez, and Troy Mason.

=== Arkansas Diamonds ===
Smith played for the Arkansas Diamonds of the Indoor Football League.

=== Kansas City Command ===
Smith is currently playing for the Kansas City Command of the Arena Football League. He is the number two receiver on the team along with Steven Savoy. Together the two take passes from one of the top quarterbacks in the leagueJ. J. Raterink. As of the sixth game of the season, Smith had racked up 52 receptions for 612 yards and 10 touchdowns. The Command rank second in the league in passing.
