= LaMarcus Coker =

American gridiron football player (born 1986)

No. 1
- Position: RB

Personal information
- Born: June 26, 1986 (age 40); Antioch, Tennessee, United States
- Listed height: 6 ft 0 in (1.83 m)
- Listed weight: 198 lb (90 kg)

Career information
- High school: Antioch High School (TN)
- College: Hampton; Tennessee

Career history
- 2011–2012: Calgary Stampeders
- Stats at CFL.ca

LaMarcus Darnell Coker (born June 26, 1986) is a former football running back who played for the Calgary Stampeders of the Canadian Football League.

== High school ==
Coker played high school football at Antioch High School. He was named the 5A Back of the year after his senior season. He concentrated on sprints for the track team, winning the state title in the 200 meter dash as a sophomore and the 100 meter dash as a junior.

== College career ==
=== Tennessee ===
Coker enjoyed a successful college football career as a running back at the University of Tennessee and, later, at Hampton University. He was named a starting running back at Tennessee during the 2006 season. He scored a touchdown on his first college reception, a trick play pass from Lucas Taylor. In addition to being a multipurpose threat out of the backfield, Coker excelled as a kick returner and special teams gunner.

After the 2006 season, Coker was named to The Sporting News Freshman All SEC team and first team Freshman All American. He ended the season with 696 yards on 108 carries and scored six total touchdowns while leading the Vols in rushing.

Coker was a starter over Arian Foster in the 2007 season before the University of Tennessee dismissed Coker for violating its drug policy.

=== Hampton ===
From 2008 to 2009, Coker was the featured back in Hampton University's spread offense. In 2009, he led the Mid-Eastern Athletic Conference (MEAC) in rushing yards with 1,027 yards at season's end and finished second in all-purpose yards with 1,537 yards. Coker was named first team All-MEAC and was selected to play in the eighth annual East Coast Bowl and the HBCU Senior Bowl.

In the East Coast Bowl, Coker rushed twelve times for 204 yards and three touchdowns and was named the most valuable player of the game.

== Professional career ==
After playing for the Nashville Storm, a local adult amateur team, Coker was signed to the practice roster of the Calgary Stampeders of the Canadian Football League in May 2011. On June 22, 2013, Coker was released by the Calgary Stampeders.
