= Dan Brooks =

American football player and coach

Biographical details
- Born: June 25, 1951 (age 74); Sparta, North Carolina, U.S.

Playing career
- 1969–1972: Appalachian State
- 1973: Western Carolina
- Position(s): Defensive lineman

Coaching career (HC unless noted)
- 1983–1987: Florida (DE)
- 1988–1993: North Carolina (DL)
- 1994–2008: Tennessee (DL)
- 2009–2016: Clemson (AHC/DT)

Accomplishments and honors

Awards
- AFCA Assistant Coach of the Year (2016)

Dan Brooks (born June 25, 1951) is an American former football coach and player.

== Playing career ==
Brooks played as a defensive lineman for Appalachian State University from 1969 to 1972, before transferring to Western Carolina University in 1973.

== Coaching career ==
=== Clemson ===
From 2009 to 2016 he served as the defensive tackles coach for Clemson University. During the 2016 season, Brooks was named AFCA Division I FBS Assistant Coach of the Year by the American Football Coaches Association. After the 2016 season, he retired from being a college football coach.
