= David Cutcliffe =

Former American football coach (born 1954)

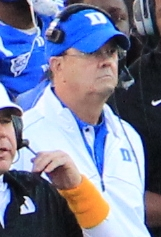

Biographical details
- Born: September 16, 1954 (age 72); Birmingham, Alabama, U.S.
- Education: University of Alabama

Coaching career (HC unless noted)
- 1976–1979: Banks HS (AL) (assistant)
- 1980–1981: Banks HS (AL)
- 1982: Tennessee (assistant)
- 1983–1988: Tennessee (TE)
- 1989: Tennessee (RB)
- 1990–1991: Tennessee (QB)
- 1992: Tennessee (PGC/QB)
- 1993–1994: Tennessee (OC/QB)
- 1995–1998: Tennessee (AHC/OC/QB)
- 1998–2004: Ole Miss
- 2006–2007: Tennessee (AHC/OC/QB)
- 2008–2021: Duke

Head coaching record
- Overall: 121–126
- Bowls: 7–4

Accomplishments and honors

Championships
- SEC Western Division (2003); ACC Coastal Division (2013)

Awards
- Broyles Award (1998); SEC Coach of the Year (2003); ACC Coach of the Year (2012, 2013); Walter Camp Coach of the Year (2013); The Sporting News Co-Coach of the Year (2013); Maxwell Football Club Coach of the Year (2013); Bobby Dodd Coach of The Year (2013); AFCA Coach of the Year (2013)

David Nelson Cutcliffe (born September 16, 1954) is an American former college football coach. Under Cutcliffe, in 2012 the Duke Blue Devils ended an 18-year bowl drought and also brought the Victory Bell back to Duke after beating arch-rival University of North Carolina. The following season, Cutcliffe led the team to a second straight bowl appearance, another win over North Carolina, an Atlantic Coast Conference Coastal Division championship and the first 10-win season in school history. He also earned multiple college football coach of the year awards from the Walter Camp Football Foundation, the Maxwell Football Club, and the Bobby Dodd Foundation.

== Early life ==
Cutcliffe was born and raised in Birmingham, Alabama, which played a formative role in his development as a football coach. He has two brothers (Charles "Paige" Cutcliffe, and Raymond Eugene "JR." Cutcliffe) and three sisters (Mary Marlyn Cutcliffe Sullivan, Margart Lynn Cutcliffe, and Elizabeth "Buff" Cutcliffe Easterly). Cutcliffe attended Banks High School in Birmingham where he played football. He attended the University of Alabama, where he worked as an assistant director of the athletic dormitory.

== Coaching career ==
=== Early coaching career ===
In 1976, Cutcliffe took a job at Banks High School where he served as an assistant and later as the head coach. In 1982, he was hired as a part-time coach at the University of Tennessee. A year later, he was promoted to full-time status as the tight ends and assistant offensive line coach. By 1990, Cutcliffe was promoted to quarterbacks coach. He became offensive coordinator as well in 1993. As coordinator, Cutcliffe helped lead the Vols to two Southeastern Conference championships and a national championship. He also helped groom Heath Shuler and future Super Bowl MVP and Pro Football Hall of Famer Peyton Manning, serving as their position coach.

=== Ole Miss ===
On December 2, 1998, Cutcliffe was hired as the head football coach at Ole Miss after Tommy Tuberville left for Auburn. Cutcliffe had success at Ole Miss, where he recruited Eli Manning, son of Ole Miss player Archie Manning, to play quarterback. In 2003, Cutcliffe's Rebels tied LSU for the Southeastern Conference West Division title, and they won the Cotton Bowl Classic, the Rebels' most prestigious bowl game since the Johnny Vaught era. The bowl victory capped off the Rebels' first 10-win season in 32 years, and only their second since Vaught's tenure.

Cutcliffe was fired by Ole Miss Athletic Director Pete Boone in December 2004 after his only losing season at Ole Miss. Boone had asked Cutcliffe to fire some assistant coaches and provide a detailed plan for improving the program, specifically the defense and recruiting. Cutcliffe refused to fire any staff members, and was subsequently fired along with his assistants.

=== Post-Ole Miss ===
After his stint at Ole Miss, Cutcliffe was hired by head coach Charlie Weis as the assistant head coach and quarterbacks coach at Notre Dame, but health problems forced him to resign before his first season there. In 2005, he underwent successful triple-bypass surgery to correct a 99-percent blocked artery. After taking a year off he returned to Knoxville to coach Tennessee again and join his sons, Chris Cutcliffe and Marcus Hilliard, then Tennessee students, on campus (his oldest daughter, Katie Cutcliffe Kolls, would also attend Tennessee). After Cutcliffe's successor as offensive coordinator at Tennessee, Randy Sanders, resigned, Phillip Fulmer rehired Cutcliffe to replace him.

Cutcliffe led a major turnaround of the Tennessee offense during the 2006 season. Tennessee quarterback Erik Ainge ranked among the nation's top 25 passers by yardage, and wide receiver Robert Meachem had the third-most receiving yards of any player.

=== Duke University ===
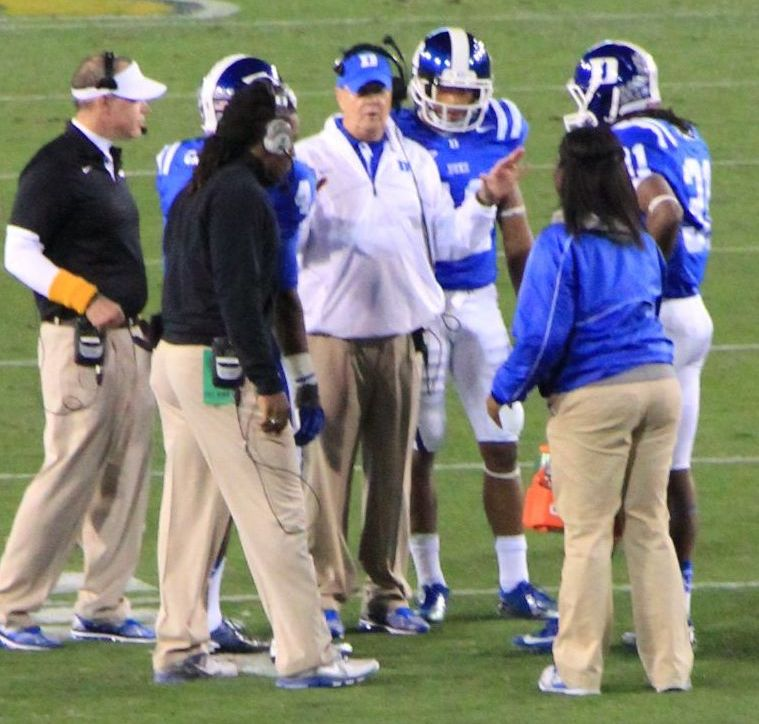
Cutcliffe meeting with players, 2012

Cutcliffe was hired as the head football coach at Duke University on December 14, 2007, replacing Ted Roof, who had amassed a 4–42 win–loss record (1–31 in the ACC) over four years at the school. Cutcliffe inherited a program that had tallied only three winning seasons in the last 25 years and, before the 2008 season, had not beaten an ACC opponent in over three seasons.

Cutcliffe immediately began a strength and conditioning program, challenging the team to collectively lose 1,000 pounds after finding the team in less than ideal physical shape.

On Saturday, August 30, 2008, Cutcliffe won his first game as Duke's head coach, defeating the James Madison Dukes 31–7, before a crowd of 32,571, the largest in Wallace Wade Stadium since 1994. The game marked the introduction of a number of rituals that Cutcliffe hoped to turn into Duke traditions, including the Blue Devil Walk, which parades the players and coaching staff from Duke Chapel, through West Campus and past Cameron Indoor Stadium to Wallace Wade Stadium, and the "Blue Devil Rock", located in the stadium tunnel and mined from the same quarry used in the construction of Duke's West Campus.

In Cutcliffe's second game, Duke lost to Northwestern in a mirror image game of the previous season's matchup, twice falling short of a touchdown deep in Northwestern territory. After the home loss against Northwestern, Duke hosted Navy, prevailing 41–31. Cutcliffe next led Duke to its first ACC victory since 2004, with a 31–3 rout of Virginia. This was a complete turnaround from the team's 2006 game against UVA, in which the Blue Devils were shut out 37–0 in Wallace Wade. Duke proceeded to lose to Georgia Tech and Miami before notching its first road win of the season, a 10–7 victory over SEC opponent Vanderbilt. Next, on the road at Wake Forest, Duke lost in overtime, 33–30, missing what would have been a game-winning field goal at the end of regulation. This was another in a string of such painful kicking miscues for the Blue Devils, including a miss at North Carolina in the previous season. The next game, Duke went on to lose to Clemson, 31–7, before fighting to a surprisingly close 14–3 loss to powerhouse Virginia Tech and suffering a disappointing close loss to arch-rival North Carolina at season's end.

In January 2010, following Lane Kiffin's abrupt departure after just one season at the helm of the Tennessee football team, Cutcliffe quickly emerged as a leading candidate to replace Kiffin. Cutcliffe, however, ultimately rebuffed Tennessee's overtures, remaining at Duke and stating, “After much thought and consideration, Karen and I reached the decision that Duke is the place for our family. We have both family members and lifetime friends in the Knoxville community and share a deep respect for the University of Tennessee. Our ties to the school and the Eastern Tennessee area are obvious. But before Tennessee’s hiring process comes to a conclusion, I know that Duke University is where we want to coach.” Cutcliffe's decision was widely lauded as a rare example of commitment and integrity among prominent college football coaches.

On October 20, 2012, Coach Cutcliffe led the Devils to their first win over North Carolina since 2003. In doing so, Duke became bowl eligible for the first time since 1994 to the Belk Bowl. The Blue Devils appeared poised to win their first bowl game in 51 years after building a 16–0 lead against the Big East Conference co-champion Cincinnati Bearcats. But the Bearcats stormed back, finishing the game on a 48 to 18 run denying the Devils the victory. Still, the successful season earned Cutcliffe the ACC Coach of the Year on November 27, 2012.

On October 26, 2013, Cutcliffe led the Blue Devils to an upset of #14 Virginia Tech, 13–10. This was Duke's first win over a ranked opponent since beating #14 Virginia in 1994. With this win, the Blue Devils became bowl eligible for a second consecutive season for the first time since the 1988 and 1989 seasons. A win over NC State the following week guaranteed the Blue Devils their first winning season in 20 years, and only their ninth in 50 years. On November 29, with a close 27–25 win over North Carolina, the Blue Devils clinched their first-ever Coastal Division title, as well as the first 10-win season in their over 100-year football history. They also garnered a berth in the 2013 ACC Championship Game falling to the eventual National Champion Florida State Seminoles and Heisman Trophy winner Jameis Winston 45–7. Duke's historic 2013 season concluded on New Year's Eve in Atlanta, GA, at the Chick-fil-A Bowl against the Texas A&M Aggies, led by 2012 Heisman Trophy winner Johnny Manziel. In a high-scoring affair totaling 100 points, Duke took a 38–17 halftime lead before ultimately succumbing to a Manziel-led rally, 52–48.

The 2014 season under Cutcliffe started off with four double-digit victories over Elon at home, Troy on the road, Kansas at home and Tulane at home. In week 5, they lost for the first time that season on the road against Miami, 10–22. In week 7, Duke upset #22 ranked opponent Georgia Tech in Bobby Dodd Stadium, 31–25, and beat Virginia the following week at home. By week 9, they had entered the AP Top 25 for the first time that season, coming in at #24. Duke won a double-overtime thriller on the road at Pittsburgh, 51–48, where wide receiver Jamison Crowder caught 9 passes for 165 yards and 2 touchdowns. Following a 27–10 victory over Syracuse in the Carrier Dome, Duke entered their week 11 matchup against Virginia Tech at home ranked #19 in the nation. After starting out with a 10–0 lead and eventually coming to a 16–7 lead late in the third quarter, Virginia Tech kicker Joey Slye made a 35-yard field goal in the final seconds of the third quarter to cut the lead down to 6 points. Virginia Tech would score a touchdown in the fourth quarter, and upset #19 Duke 17–16 on the road. North Carolina dominated the Blue Devils 45–20 the following week, and Duke fell out of the top 25. Duke lost the Sun Bowl against #15 Arizona State, and finished the season 9–4.

In 2015, Cutcliffe's team started out 2–0 with blowout victories over Tulane and North Carolina Central. On September 26, 2015, Duke upset #20 Georgia Tech, 34–20. Duke began the 2015 season with a record of 6–1, and reached as high as #22 in the AP Top 25. Following these accomplishments, the Blue Devils lost four straight games, including a 35-point loss to North Carolina on the road. Cutcliffe's squad would finish 8–5 on the season, and defeat Indiana in the 2015 Pinstripe Bowl 44–41. This bowl marked Duke's first bowl victory in 54 years. Also, it was and it remains the highest scoring Pinstripe Bowl in the game's history.

Duke was projected to finish near the bottom of its division in the ACC in 2016, being quarterbacked by-then redshirt freshman, former walk-on, and future first-round NFL Draft pick Daniel Jones. After starting the season with a 49–6 win over North Carolina Central, Duke would fall to 3–3, a record from which they would not improve. The only remaining game Duke would win during the 2016 season was an upset over its rival, no. 15-ranked North Carolina, by a score of 28–27. Cutcliffe's team would finish with a record of 4–8 overall and a 1–7 record in the ACC.

Despite a fairly strong first season from Daniel Jones in 2016, the 4–8 season finish led Duke's 2017 squad to be voted to finish second-last in its division in the preseason ACC polls. Duke would nonetheless start the season very strongly, and be undefeated through their first 4 games, including on the road against their hated rival in North Carolina. However, their opponents were weak; two (Baylor, UNC) failed to win more than 4 combined games, and one (NC Central) was an FCS program. Duke would be defeated in its next six games after winning its first four; four of those losses during that streak were by one score. But Cutcliffe's team would once again go on a positive streak and win its next three games, including the 2017 Quick Lane Bowl against Northern Illinois, and finish the season with a record of 7–6.

Cutcliffe's 2018 team would start the season 4–0 with impressive road victories over Baylor and Northwestern, the latter playing in the Big Ten Championship Game later that season. Entering their game against Virginia Tech, Duke was ranked in the AP Poll for the first time since 2015. Duke would lose to Virginia Tech and ultimately lose four more conference games to finish with a disappointing ACC record of 3–5, good for second-last in the Coastal Division. However, Cutcliffe's team defeated North Carolina in a 42–35 shootout, and would ultimately score 50 points to the Temple Owls' 27 in the Independence Bowl. Duke would finish the season 8–5. Redshirt junior quarterback Daniel Jones would enter the 2019 NFL draft following a strong 2018 campaign and ultimately be selected in the first round by the New York Giants.

In 2019, Duke was projected to take a step back and finish 5th out of 7 in the Coastal Division. Duke would open the season with a 4–2 record thanks in large part to a relatively easy schedule, but Duke would lose all their remaining games except for the finale against the Miami Hurricanes, including a defeat to rival North Carolina. Cutcliffe's team finished 5–7 with a 3–5 conference record, which was second-worst in their division.

Duke's 2020 team was projected to finish 12th in the ACC out of 15. In the bizarre and restricted 2020 football season, the ACC's divisions were temporarily dissolved (before making the change permanent in 2023), and Duke would play just 11 games, with the majority of those contests happening behind closed doors. Duke would win just two games against a Syracuse team that finished 1–10 and a Charlotte 49ers squad that went 2–4. Cutcliffe and the Blue Devils finished 2–9 overall and 1–9 in the ACC, tied for last with the tiebreaking win over Syracuse.

Duke's 2021 football team would hit what was an unforeseen low during Cutcliffe's tenure at the helm. The team was projected by zero ACC media members to finish atop the Coastal Division, as well as being almost unanimously picked to finish last. Duke would start the season with a record of 3–1. Cutcliffe's team once again faced very poor non-conference opponents, and the hot start would prove to be misleading as Duke failed to win a single conference game, with perhaps the hardest loss to stomach being a 7–38 blowout loss to North Carolina in Chapel Hill. The 2021 Blue Devils finished with an overall record of 3–9 and 0–8 in conference play.

On November 28, 2021, it was announced that Cutcliffe and Duke University had agreed to mutually part ways following three straight losing seasons. Cutcliffe released the following statement: "After some detailed and amiable discussions with Nina King, we've mutually decided that it is the right time for change in the leadership of Duke Football. Karen and I have loved our time in Durham. Duke University will always hold a special place in our hearts. To our current and former players please know how much joy you've brought to our lives. To all of our coaches and staff, many who have been with us for 14 years, you will always have our love and respect. I want to thank Dick Brodhead for the opportunity to come here. I'm very thankful for Kevin White and Nina and their leadership. I can't say enough about all the faithful alumni and friends that gave us an opportunity to build and win here. I'm not sure just yet what the future will look like, but I am looking forward to some family time to reflect a bit on the past and see what the future holds."

Cutcliffe is third on Duke's all-time wins list, behind only Hall of Famers Wallace Wade and Bill Murray.

=== Quarterback coaching ===
Eight quarterbacks whom Cutcliffe coached in college have gone on to play in the NFL: Heath Shuler, Peyton Manning, Tee Martin, Eli Manning, Erik Ainge, Thaddeus Lewis, Sean Renfree, and Daniel Jones.

Cutcliffe also coached former Colorado Rockies first baseman Todd Helton while Helton played quarterback at Tennessee. Eli Manning's former backup, Seth Smith, is a retired professional baseball player.

== Coaching tree ==
Head coaches under whom Cutcliffe served:

- Johnny Majors: Tennessee (1982–1992)
- Phillip Fulmer: Tennessee (1992–1998; 2006–2007)

Assistant coaches under Cutcliffe who became college or professional head coaches:

- Mike MacIntyre: San Jose State (2010–2012), Colorado (2013–2018), FIU (2022–2024)
- Matt Luke: Ole Miss (2017–2019)
- Jim Knowles: Cornell (2004–2009)
- Jay Hopson: Alcorn State (2012–2015), Southern Miss (2016–2020)
- Scottie Montgomery: East Carolina (2016–2018)
- Jeff Faris: Austin Peay (2024–present)
- Gerad Parker: Troy (2024–present)

== Head coaching record ==
Year	Team	Overall	Conference	Standing	Bowl/playoffs	Coaches^{#}	AP^{°}
Ole Miss Rebels (Southeastern Conference) (1998–2004)
1998	Ole Miss	1–0*	0–0*		W Independence		
1999	Ole Miss	8–4	4–4	3rd (Western)	W Independence	22	22
2000	Ole Miss	7–5	4–4	3rd (Western)	L Music City		
2001	Ole Miss	7–4	4–4	5th (Western)			
2002	Ole Miss	7–6	3–5	4th (Western)	W Independence		
2003	Ole Miss	10–3	7–1	T–1st (Western)	W Cotton	14	13
2004	Ole Miss	4–7	3–5	3rd (Western)			
Ole Miss:		44–29	25–23	*coached last game of 1998, the Independence Bowl			
Duke Blue Devils (Atlantic Coast Conference) (2008–2021)
2008	Duke	4–8	1–7	6th (Coastal)			
2009	Duke	5–7	3–5	5th (Coastal)			
2010	Duke	3–9	1–7	T–5th (Coastal)			
2011	Duke	3–9	1–7	6th (Coastal)			
2012	Duke	6–7	3–5	T–5th (Coastal)	L Belk		
2013	Duke	10–4	6–2	1st (Coastal)	L Chick-fil-A	22	23
2014	Duke	9–4	5–3	2nd (Coastal)	L Sun		
2015	Duke	8–5	4–4	T–4th (Coastal)	W Pinstripe		
2016	Duke	4–8	1–7	T–6th (Coastal)			
2017	Duke	7–6	3–5	T–4th (Coastal)	W Quick Lane		
2018	Duke	8–5	3–5	6th (Coastal)	W Independence		
2019	Duke	5–7	3–5	6th (Coastal)			
2020	Duke	2–9	1–9	T–14th			
2021	Duke	3–9	0–8	7th (Coastal)			
Duke:		77–97	35–79				
Total:		121–126					
National championship Conference title Conference division title or championship game berth
^{#}Rankings from final Coaches Poll.; ^{°}Rankings from final AP Poll.
