= 2005 Auburn Tigers football team =

American college football season

2005 Auburn Tigers football

SEC Western Division co-champion

Capital One Bowl, L 10–24 vs. Wisconsin
- Conference: Southeastern Conference
- Western Division

Ranking
- Coaches: No. 14
- AP: No. 14
- Record: 9–3 (7–1 SEC)
- Head coach: Tommy Tuberville (7th season)
- Offensive coordinator: Al Borges (2nd season)
- Offensive scheme: Pro-style
- Defensive coordinator: David Gibbs (1st season)
- Base defense: 4–3
- Home stadium: Jordan–Hare Stadium

2005 Southeastern Conference football standings
	Conf.			Overall
Team	W		L	W		L
Eastern Division
No. 10 Georgia x$	6	–	2	10	–	3
South Carolina	5	–	3	7	–	5
No. 12 Florida	5	–	3	9	–	3
Vanderbilt	3	–	5	5	–	6
Tennessee	3	–	5	5	–	6
Kentucky	2	–	6	3	–	8
Western Division
No. 5 LSU xy	7	–	1	11	–	2
No. 14 Auburn x	7	–	1	9	–	3
No. 8 Alabama	6	–	2	10	–	2
Arkansas	2	–	6	4	–	7
Mississippi State	1	–	7	3	–	8
Ole Miss	1	–	7	3	–	8
Championship: Georgia 34, LSU 14
$ – BCS representative as conference champion; x – Division champion/co-champions; y – Championship game participant; Alabama had all victories vacated by the NCAA in 2010. As such, the official record for Alabama is 0–2 (0–2).; Rankings from AP Poll

The 2005 Auburn Tigers football team represented Auburn University in the 2005 NCAA Division I-A football season. Despite having four starters from the 2004 team selected in the first round of 2005 NFL draft, Auburn finished the season with a 9–3 record, including a 7–1 record in the Southeastern Conference. The Tigers shared the SEC Western Division championship with LSU, but because the Bayou Bengals defeated Auburn 20–17 in overtime on October 22, the Tigers did not advance to the SEC Championship Game. Head coach Tommy Tuberville became only the third Tigers coach to lead Auburn to a fourth consecutive win over arch rival Alabama when the Tigers defeated the Crimson Tide 28–18 at Jordan–Hare Stadium on November 19. Auburn finished the season ranked #14 in both the Coaches Poll and AP Poll, with a #13 consensus ranking.

== Schedule ==
Date	Time	Opponent	Rank	Site	TV	Result	Attendance
September 3	6:45 pm	Georgia Tech*	No. 16	Jordan–Hare Stadium; Auburn, Alabama (rivalry)	ESPN	L 14–23	87,451
September 10	11:30 am	Mississippi State		Jordan–Hare Stadium; Auburn, Alabama	JPS	W 28–0	81,921
September 17	1:30 pm	Ball State*		Jordan–Hare Stadium; Auburn, Alabama	PPV	W 63–3	78,427
September 24	1:30 pm	No. 1 (I-AA) Western Kentucky*		Jordan–Hare Stadium; Auburn, Alabama		W 37–14	80,632
October 1	6:00 pm	South Carolina		Jordan–Hare Stadium; Auburn, Alabama	ESPN2	W 48–7	87,451
October 15	6:00 pm	at Arkansas	No. 21	Donald W. Reynolds Razorback Stadium; Fayetteville, Arkansas		W 34–17	71,673
October 22	6:45 pm	at No. 7 LSU	No. 16	Tiger Stadium; Baton Rouge, Louisiana (Tiger Bowl)	ESPN	L 17–20 ^{OT}	92,664
October 29	11:30 am	Ole Miss	No. 19	Jordan–Hare Stadium; Auburn, Alabama (rivalry)	JPS	W 27–3	85,791
November 5	12:00 pm	at Kentucky	No. 17	Commonwealth Stadium; Lexington, Kentucky	CSS	W 49–27	60,519
November 12	6:45 pm	at No. 9 Georgia	No. 15	Sanford Stadium; Athens, Georgia (Deep South's Oldest Rivalry)	ESPN	W 31–30	92,746
November 19	2:30 pm	No. 8 Alabama	No. 11	Jordan–Hare Stadium; Auburn, Alabama	CBS	W 28–18	87,451
January 1	12:00 pm	vs. No. 21 Wisconsin*	No. 7	Florida Citrus Bowl; Orlando, Florida (Capital One Bowl)	ABC	L 10–24	57,221
*Non-conference game; Rankings from AP Poll released prior to the game; All times are in Central time

== Rankings ==
Ranking movements Legend: ██ Increase in ranking ██ Decrease in ranking RV = Received votes
	Week															
Poll	Pre	1	2	3	4	5	6	7	8	9	10	11	12	13	14	Final
AP	16	RV	RV	RV	RV	22	21	16	19	17	15	11	9	9	7	14
Coaches	15	25	RV	RV	24	21	20	15	19	18	17	12	9	9	7	14
Harris	Not released				RV	22	18	15	19	17	15	11	9	9	7	Not released
BCS	Not released							18	22	20	20	13	10	10	9	Not released

== Roster ==
2005 Auburn Tigers football team roster
Players
Coaches
Offense

Pos.	#	Name	Class
WR	1	Devin Aromashodu	Sr
QB	12	Brandon Cox	So
G	76	Tim Duckworth	Jr
OT	77	King Dunlap	So
G	69	Ben Grubbs	Jr
RB	23	Kenny Irons	Jr
RB	28	Brad Lester	Fr
OT	73	Marcus McNeill	Sr
WR	9	Anthony Mix	Sr
WR	2	Ben Obomanu	Sr
G	79	Jonathan Palmer	Jr
OT	66	Troy Reddick	Sr
WR	15	Prechae Rodriguez	So
WR	21	Rodgeriqus Smith	Fr
RB	22	Tre Smith	Jr
FB	32	Carl Stewart	So
WR	86	Courtney Taylor	Jr
TE	93	Cooper Wallace	Sr

Defense

Pos.	#	Name	Class
LB	10	Tray Blackmon	Fr
SS	33	Eric Brock	So
DE	52	Antonio Coleman	Fr
FS	27	Tristan Davis	Fr
LB	21	Karibi Dede	Jr
NG	90	Tyronne Green	Fr
DE	54	Quentin Groves	So
DE	48	Marquies Gunn	Jr
FS	39	Josh Hebert	So
FS	35	Will Herring	Jr
FS	49	Kevin Hobbs	Sr
CB	4	David Irons	Sr
NG	58	T. J. Jackson	Sr
CB	20	Pat Lee	So
DT	94	Sen'Derrick Marks	Fr
DE	75	Stanley McClover	Jr
CB	6	Walter McFadden	Fr
CB	29	Jerraud Powers	Fr
DT	95	Pat Sims	Fr
NG	97	Josh Thompson	So
DB	42	Patrick Trahan	Fr
CB	24	Jonathan Wilhite	So
LB	51	Travis Williams	Sr

Special teams

Pos.	#	Name	Class
P	30	Kody Bliss	Jr
K	37	John Vaughn	Jr

Head coach

- Tommy Tuberville

Coordinators/assistant coaches

Legend

- (C) Team captain
- (S) Suspended
- (I) Ineligible
- Injured
- Redshirt

=== Offensive starters ===
Position	Player
QB	Brandon Cox
HB	Kenny Irons
FB	Jake Slaughter
WR	Ben Obomanu
WR	Devin Aromashodu
TE	Cooper Wallace
LT	Marcus McNeill
LG	Ben Grubbs
C	Joe Cope
RG	Tim Duckworth
RT	Troy Reddick

=== Defensive starters ===
Position	Player
LE	Marquies Gunn
NG	Tommy Jackson
DT	Wayne Dickens
RE	Stanley McClover
LB	Karibi Dede
LB	Travis Williams
LB	Antarrious Williams
CB	David Irons
SS	Eric Brock
FS	Will Herring
CB	Jonathan Wilhite

=== Team captains ===
Position	Player
WR	Ben Obomanu
LT	Marcus McNeill
NG	Tommy Jackson
LB	Travis Williams

== Game summaries ==
=== Georgia ===
Team	1	2	3	4	Total
• Auburn	7	7	7	10	31
Georgia	10	3	7	10	30

- Date: November 12
- Location: Sanford Stadium, Athens, Georgia
- Game start: 7:45 p.m. EST

Scoring summary
Q1	9:45	AUB	Kenny Irons 30 yard run (John Vaughn kick)	AUB 7–0
Q1	8:28	UGA	Brandon Coutu 49 yard field goal	AUB 7–3
Q1	4:50	UGA	Leonard Pope 4 yard pass from D.J. Shockley (Brandon Coutu kick)	UGA 10–7
Q2	6:18	AUB	Kenny Irons 6 yard run (John Vaughn kick)	AUB 14–10
Q2	1:13	UGA	Brandon Coutu 28 yard field goal	AUB 14–13
Q3	10:45	UGA	Mohamed Massaquoi 9 yard pass from D.J. Shockley (Brandon Coutu kick)	UGA 20–14
Q3	8:21	AUB	Ben Obomanu 30 yard run (John Vaughn kick)	AUB 21–20
Q4	12:33	UGA	Thomas Brown 6 yard run (Brandon Coutu kick)	UGA 27–21
Q4	9:28	AUB	Karibi Dede 15 yard fumble return (John Vaughn kick)	AUB 28–27
Q4	3:25	UGA	Brandon Coutu 41 yard field goal	UGA 30–28
Q4	:06	AUB	John Vaughn 20 yard field goal	AUB 31–30
