= 2006 Auburn Tigers football team =

American college football season

2006 Auburn Tigers football

Cotton Bowl Classic champion

Cotton Bowl Classic, W 17–14 vs. Nebraska
- Conference: Southeastern Conference
- Western Division

Ranking
- Coaches: No. 8
- AP: No. 9
- Record: 11–2 (6–2 SEC)
- Head coach: Tommy Tuberville (8th season)
- Offensive coordinator: Al Borges (3rd season)
- Offensive scheme: Gulf Coast
- Defensive coordinator: Will Muschamp (1st season)
- Base defense: 4–3
- Home stadium: Jordan–Hare Stadium

2006 Southeastern Conference football standings
	Conf.			Overall
Team	W		L	W		L
Eastern Division
No. 1 Florida x$#	7	–	1	13	–	1
No. 25 Tennessee	5	–	3	9	–	4
No. 23 Georgia	4	–	4	9	–	4
Kentucky	4	–	4	8	–	5
South Carolina	3	–	5	8	–	5
Vanderbilt	1	–	7	4	–	8
Western Division
No. 15 Arkansas x	7	–	1	10	–	4
No. 9 Auburn	6	–	2	11	–	2
No. 3 LSU %	6	–	2	11	–	2
Alabama	2	–	6	6	–	7
Ole Miss	2	–	6	4	–	8
Mississippi State	1	–	7	3	–	9
Championship: Florida 38, Arkansas 28
# – BCS National Champion; $ – BCS representative as conference champion; % – BCS at-large representative; x – Division champion/co-champions; Alabama had all victories vacated by the NCAA in 2010. As such, the official record for Alabama is 0–7 (0–6).; Rankings from AP Poll

The 2006 Auburn Tigers football team represented Auburn University in the 2006 NCAA Division I FBS football season. Head coach Tommy Tuberville served his eighth season at Auburn, the third longest tenure among current SEC head coaches that year. Offensive coordinator Al Borges returned for his third season to direct the offense and was joined by first-year defensive coordinator Will Muschamp who came from the Miami Dolphins. Auburn played its eight-game home schedule within the friendly confines of Jordan–Hare Stadium, the ninth largest on-campus stadium in the NCAA seating 87,451. The Tigers finished the season with an impressive 11–2 record, finishing second in the SEC Western Division behind the surprising Arkansas Razorbacks. With signature wins over the eventual BCS champion Florida Gators and the final-ranked #3 LSU Tigers, Auburn was the only team that could claim victories over two BCS and top five teams. However, the team also had signature losses to the unranked Arkansas Razorbacks and Georgia Bulldogs. They finished the season ranked #8 in the Coaches Poll and #9 in the AP Poll.

== Pre-season ==
Prior to the season, the Auburn Tigers were ranked #6 in the initial Coaches Poll with one first place vote and #4 in the AP with three first place votes. Other rankings include The Sporting News #3, CBSSportsLine.com #3, The Gold Sheet #2, Phil Steele #2, Insiders' Football News #2, and VegasInsider.com #4.

Based on a favorable schedule featuring the most difficult opponents in home games and with returning starters Brandon Cox at quarterback and Heisman Award-candidate Kenny Irons at tailback, Auburn was predicted to be in contention for a BCS bowl and possible national championship. CollegeFootballNews.com projected Auburn to be playing against USC in the BCS National Championship Game, a match-up many argue should have been played in 2004.

Prior to the season, Auburn switched uniform providers, ending its long association with Russell Athletic for a new agreement with UnderArmour. In addition, UnderArmour became the official footwear provider for the team.

== Schedule ==
Date	Time	Opponent	Rank	Site	TV	Result	Attendance
September 2	6:45 pm	Washington State*	No. 4	Jordan–Hare Stadium; Auburn, AL	ESPN2	W 40–14	87,451
September 9	11:30 am	at Mississippi State	No. 4	Davis Wade Stadium; Starkville, MS	Raycom/LFS	W 34–0	43,640
September 16	2:30 pm	No. 6 LSU	No. 3	Jordan–Hare Stadium; Auburn, AL (Tiger Bowl)	CBS	W 7–3	87,451
September 23	1:30 pm	Buffalo*	No. 2	Jordan–Hare Stadium; Auburn, AL		W 38–7	84,921
September 28	6:45 pm	at South Carolina	No. 2	Williams-Brice Stadium; Columbia, SC	ESPN	W 24–17	74,374
October 7	11:00 am	Arkansas	No. 2	Jordan–Hare Stadium; Auburn, AL	CBS	L 10–27	87,451
October 14	6:45 pm	No. 2 Florida	No. 11	Jordan–Hare Stadium; Auburn, AL (rivalry) (College GameDay)	ESPN	W 27–17	87,451
October 21	1:30 pm	Tulane*^{†}	No. 8	Jordan–Hare Stadium; Auburn, AL (rivalry)		W 38–13	79,837
October 28	11:30 am	at Ole Miss	No. 7	Vaught–Hemingway Stadium; Oxford, MS (rivalry)	Raycom/LFS	W 23–17	55,211
November 4	1:30 pm	Arkansas State*	No. 6	Jordan–Hare Stadium; Auburn, AL	PPV	W 27–0	78,493
November 11	11:30 am	Georgia	No. 5	Jordan–Hare Stadium; Auburn, AL (Deep South's Oldest Rivalry)	Raycom/LFS	L 15–37	87,451
November 18	2:30 pm	at Alabama	No. 15	Bryant–Denny Stadium; Tuscaloosa, AL (Iron Bowl)	CBS	W 22–15	92,138
January 1	10:30 am	vs. No. 22 Nebraska*	No. 10	Cotton Bowl; Dallas, TX (Cotton Bowl Classic)	FOX	W 17–14	66,777
*Non-conference game; ^{†}Homecoming; Rankings from AP Poll released prior to the game; All times are in Central time

== Rankings ==
Ranking movements Legend: ██ Increase in ranking ██ Decrease in ranking ( ) = First-place votes
	Week															
Poll	Pre	1	2	3	4	5	6	7	8	9	10	11	12	13	14	Final
AP	4 (3)	4 (3)	3 (2)	2 (2)	2 (2)	2	11	8	7	6	5	15	14	11	10	9
Coaches Poll	6 (1)	4 (2)	4 (1)	3 (1)	3 (2)	3 (1)	10	7	7	6	5	15	13	11	10	8
Harris	Not released				3 (2)	3 (1)	10	7	7	6	5	15	13	12	10	Not released
BCS	Not released							4	5	6	6	14	12	11	9	Not released

== Coaching staff ==
Name	Position	Years at AU	Alma mater (Year)
Tommy Tuberville	Head coach	7	Southern Arkansas University (1976)
Al Borges	Offensive coordinator Quarterbacks	2	California State University, Chico (1982)
Hugh Nall	Offensive line	7	University of Georgia (1983)
Eddie Gran	Running backs Special teams	7	California Lutheran (1987)
Steve Ensminger	Tight ends	7	Louisiana State University (1982)
Greg Knox	Wide receivers Recruiting coordinator	7	Northeastern State (1986); Northeastern (1990)
Will Muschamp	Defensive coordinator Secondary	0	University of Georgia (1994); Auburn University (1996)
Don Dunn	Defensive tackles	7	East Tennessee State (1976); Union College (1980)
Terry Price	Defensive ends	7	Texas A&M (1992)
James Willis	Linebackers	0	Auburn University (2003)

== Game summaries ==
=== Washington State ===
	1	2	3	4	Total
Cougars	7	0	7	0	14
#6 Tigers	6	13	7	14	40

This game marked the first meeting between Auburn and Pac-10 opponent Washington State, although Auburn was 4–3 in previous Pac-10 matchups. Auburn entered the game looking to defend its preseason rankings and avoid stumbling as in a similar situation in 2003. The Cougars, coached by Bill Doba, traveled to Auburn hoping to test the Tiger defense under new defensive coordinator Will Muschamp with a high-flying passing game featuring returning QB Alex Brink and potential All-American receiver and first-round draft choice Jason Hill. Auburn met the challenge, forcing Wazzou to go three-and-out on their first two possessions including three sacks of Brink in those first six offensive plays. Auburn stalled on their first two drives and settled for John Vaughn field goals to take a 6–0 lead.

The Cougars took advantage of their next possession, scoring a touchdown with 2:10 left in the first quarter to take the lead. It was the last time they led. In the second quarter, Auburn scored on each of its three possessions, including two more field goals and a Brad Lester touchdown to take a 19–7 lead to the locker room at halftime.

Auburn return man Tristan Davis took the second half kickoff for a 37-yard return to the Auburn 42-yard line, and on the first play from scrimmage, Kenny Irons broke open 58-yard touchdown run to put the game beyond reach of the Cougars. Washington State scored a touchdown in the third quarter and AU added two more TDs in the fourth to make the final score 40–14. Auburn held Jason Hill to only four receptions for 18 yards and intercepted Brink once to hold the Cougs potent offense in check. Kenny Irons finished with 183 yards rushing, his ninth career 100-yard game.

- SEC Offensive Player of the Week: Kenny Irons

=== Mississippi State ===
	1	2	3	4	Total
#4 Tigers	7	10	14	3	34
Bulldogs	0	0	0	0	0

Auburn traveled to Starkville for the fifteenth time to meet SEC-West foe Mississippi State under the direction of third-year coach Sylvester Croom. The Bulldogs hoped to shut down Auburn's rushing game and force Auburn QB Brandon Cox to beat them. While State did manage to hold Irons to 79 yards, Cox responded passing for 249 yards completing 18-of-27 and two touchdowns, including Rodgeriqus Smith's first. Kicker John Vaughn had a career-long 55-yard field goal and tailback Brad Lester added 41 yards rushing and two touchdowns to the offensive team effort to help Auburn to a 34–0 shutout over the Bulldogs. Croom had yet to beat Auburn and Auburn is now 56–22–2 all-time against Mississippi State with a current six-game streak.

- SEC Offensive Lineman of the Week: Ben Grubbs

=== LSU ===
	1	2	3	4	Total
#7 Tigers	0	3	0	0	3
#4 Tigers	0	0	7	0	7

Auburn defensive back Eric Brock tackled LSU receiver Craig Davis at the Auburn 5-yard line on the game's final play to preserve a 7–3 victory. The game's only touchdown was scored on a 1-yard run by Auburn quarterback Brandon Cox with 4:53 remaining in the 3rd quarter. The game was the lowest scoring game at Auburn since 1973.

- SEC Special Teams Player of the Week: Kody Bliss

=== Buffalo ===
	1	2	3	4	Total
Bulls	0	0	7	0	7
#4 Tigers	7	3	14	14	38

This game marked the first meeting between Auburn and MAC representative Buffalo. The Bulls, under head coach and former Nebraska star quarterback Turner Gill, played inspired football against the banged-up Tigers keeping the game close until late in the third quarter. Auburn played without Kenny Irons and with starting QB Brandon Cox slowed by injuries from the battle against LSU. Highly touted true freshman running back Ben Tate entered the game for Auburn in the fourth quarter and showed Tiger fans a glimpse of the future rushing for 114 yards on seven carries and scoring touchdowns on runs of 42 and 28 yards.

- SEC Special Teams Player of the Week: Matt Clark

=== South Carolina ===
	1	2	3	4	Total
#3 Tigers	7	7	3	7	24
Gamecocks	0	10	0	7	17

Auburn running back Kenny Irons, who began his college football career at South Carolina, rushed for 117 yards and scored two touchdowns as the third-ranked Tigers survived a furious comeback by the upset-minded Gamecocks and posted a 24–17 victory. The Tigers led 14–10 at halftime and took the second half kick-off. After a 24-yard field goal by senior kicker John Vaughn, Auburn surprised the Gamecocks by recovering an on-sides kick. The Tigers retained possession of the ball for the remainder of the third quarter, and Irons scored the second of his two touchdowns on the first play of the fourth quarter.

- SEC Offensive Lineman of the Week: Tim Duckworth

=== Arkansas ===
	1	2	3	4	Total
Razorbacks	10	7	7	3	27
#2 Tigers	0	10	0	0	10

Unranked Arkansas came into Jordan–Hare Stadium and claimed an easy 27–10 victory over the second-ranked Tigers. Sophomore running back Darren McFadden rushed for 145 yards, including a 63-yard run for a second quarter touchdown to lead the Razorbacks. Felix Jones rushed for another 104 yards to add to the Arkansas attack. Freshman quarterback Mitch Mustain's 50-yard touchdown pass to Monk in the first quarter set the tone for the Hogs, who won at Auburn for the third time since they joined the SEC in 1992. Auburn was limited to 213 yards total offense, and the Tigers managed only 60 rushing yards.

=== Florida ===
	1	2	3	4	Total
#3 Gators	3	14	0	0	17
#10 Tigers	3	8	7	9	27

ESPN's College GameDay was onsite as part of ESPN's Full Circle multi-channel coverage of this top ten matchup as Auburn defeated the Florida Gators 27–17 in what proved to be the only defeat for the eventual BCS national champions. The Auburn offense did not score a touchdown, but reserve running back Tre Smith scored a touchdown after recovering a blocked punt, and defensive back Patrick Lee recovered a fumble and returned it for a touchdown on the game's final play to seal the victory. Auburn's other points came from a safety in the second quarter and four field goals from senior kicker John Vaughn. The win extends the Tigers lead in the series to 41–38–2. The loss of the #2 Gators marked the fourth time during the 2006 season that the team ranked #2 in the major polls had gone down in defeat, following Texas in week 2, Notre Dame in week 3, and Auburn in week 6.

The Tigers' block of a Gators punt and return for a touchdown was named the ESPN Game-Changing Play of the Week; it later became the Game-Changing Play of the Year.

ESPN.com also named this game the "Atmosphere of the Year".

- SEC Defensive Player of the Week: Quentin Groves
- FWAA/Bronko Nagurski National Defensive Player of the Week: Quentin Groves

=== Tulane ===
	1	2	3	4	Total
Green Wave	7	3	3	0	13
#7 Tigers	7	17	7	7	38

Tulane, a former, but charter, member of the SEC, traveled to meet Auburn on the Plains for only the second time ever and the first time since 1955. Although the Green Wave entered the game leading the all-time series record 17–13–6, that success dates from the early twentieth-century, when Tulane was a football powerhouse. In this meeting, Auburn narrowed the series gap with a 38–13 victory.

With their top three running backs hobbled by injuries, quarterback Brandon Cox and true freshman tailback Ben Tate both stepped up with strong performances and to end Auburn's seven-quarter offensive touchdown drought. Cox passed for 212 yards and three touchdowns completing 16 out of 19 pass attempts while Tate rushed for 156 yards on 26 carries with one touchdown for an average of six yards per carry.

After stopping Tulane's opening possession, Auburn drove 74 yards for the opening touchdown by Brad Lester before he left the game after aggravating an existing injury. Tulane responded with an 80-yard touchdown driver of their own capped off by a 23-yard TD pass from Lester Ricard to Damarcus Davis with just over six minutes left in the first quarter. Redshirt freshmen tight-end Tommy Trott scored for AU just after starting the second quarter to make the score 14–10. Just after starting the next drive, Tulane's Richard fumbled and Auburn's Karibi Dede recovered it and advanced it to the Tulane 10-yard line setting up Cox's next touchdown pass to Tre Smith. The teams traded field goals just before halftime and then Auburn pulled away with two more touchdowns in the third quarter before taking a knee on Tulane's 10-yard line to run out the clock and end the game.

Auburn senior placekicker John Vaughn was perfect on the day completing five extra point attempts in addition to his field goal to take sole possession of Auburn's career scoring record with 284 points after entering the game tied with Carnell Williams.

- SEC Offensive Lineman of the Week: King Dunlap

=== Ole Miss ===
	1	2	3	4	Total
#7 Tigers	7	0	10	6	23
Rebels	7	0	3	7	17

Auburn traveled to Oxford, Mississippi to take on Western-division foe Ole Miss for the teams' 31st meeting. In addition to leading the series 22–8, Auburn entered the game with a 7–1 record in Oxford. Behind an extremely balanced offensive attack, Auburn overcame two first-half turnovers to survive the trip with a 23–17 victory.

Ole Miss took the opening possession and drove 82 yards and scored the game's first touchdown on a 27-yard end-around by Mico McSwain. Auburn answered with their scoring drive ending in 13-yard TD pass from Brandon Cox to wide receiver Rodgeriqus Smith. Auburn held Ole Miss on the next possession and drove down the field before Brandon Cox was intercepted by Charles Clark at the Ole Miss 12. Under quarterback Brent Schaeffer, the Rebels moved down the field to the Auburn 41 before stalling and being forced to punt and pinning Auburn on their own 2-yard line to start the drive. The Tigers opened up throwing to get out the shadows of their own goalposts and, continuing on the accurate passing of Cox, were able to move to the Rebels 40 before tailback Brad Lester fumbled at the end of a 6-yard run and the Rebels recovered but with only 45 seconds left in the half.

Auburn went three and out on the opening drive of the second half and on the subsequent drive, Mississippi was able to get within field goal range and take the lead 10–7 on a 29-yard field goal by Joshua Shene. Auburn's next drive was plagued by dropped passes forcing a 53-yard Kody Bliss punt. On Ole Miss' next play, Schaeffer threw over the middle and was picked off by safety Eric Brock at the Ole Miss 41-yard line, setting up a short drive for Auburn, ending in a six-yard TD run by Brad Lester and giving Auburn the lead 14–10.

After giving up another field goal to Auburn, the Rebels moved quickly, scoring a touchdown to tie the game 17–17 with 11:19 left in the 4th quarter. Auburn drove down the field but stalled once again against the tough Ole Miss defense and settled for another field goal by John Vaughn who because the Tigers' career leader in field goals made with the kick. Ole Miss was unable to move the ball on the next series and was forced to punt to Auburn with just five minutes left in the game. After an incompletion to open the drive, Auburn abandoned the passing game and let tailback Kenny Irons pound out the yardage and burn the clock. The Tigers drove to the Ole Miss 12 yd line before settling for a final field goal with only 35 seconds left to make the score 23–17. With no timeouts remaining and paying little attention to the new clock rules, Ole Miss could only manage one play as Schaeffer was sacked due to the Auburn coverage.

- SEC Freshman of the Week: Aairon Savage
- Lou Groza Star Of The Week: John Vaughn

=== Arkansas State ===
	1	2	3	4	Total
Indians	0	0	0	0	0
#6 Tigers	10	3	14	0	27

Auburn held Arkansas State out of the Sun Belt Conference to 177 yards total offense as the Tigers shut out the Indians 27–0. Running back Carl Stewart scored two second half touchdowns as the Tigers improved their season record to 9–1. Freshman running back Ben Tate rushed for 93 yards Brad Lester ran for 62 yards. Courtney Taylor caught four passes for 116 yards, including a 13-yard reception for a touchdown, and the Tigers improved their all-time record against teams currently in the Sun Belt Conference to 12–0.

- SEC Offensive Lineman Of The Week: Ben Grubbs

=== Georgia ===
	1	2	3	4	Total
Bulldogs	7	23	0	7	37
#5 Tigers	0	7	8	0	15

In one of the biggest upsets in the history of the Deep South's Oldest Rivalry, Georgia completely dominated Auburn and took a convincing 37–15 win over the #5 ranked Tigers. Georgia entered the game with a 6–4 record and was coming off an upset loss to Kentucky, while the Tigers entered the game with a 9–1 record and hopes for a BCS bowl bid and an outside shot at playing for the national championship.

Bulldogs freshman quarterback Matthew Stafford threw for 219 yards, ran for 83 yards and scored 2 touchdowns against what had been the Nation's #13 ranked defense. Georgia tailback Kregg Lumpkin also rushed for 105 yards and scored two touchdowns. Georgia defensive back Tra Battle intercepted three passes by Auburn quarterback Brandon Cox in the first half, and returned one 30 yards for a touchdown to put Georgia ahead 24–0 with 4:56 remaining in the second quarter. The rainy weather matched the mood of the Auburn crowd, which looked on with gloom as the offense struggled to weather the storm.

Auburn was limited to 171 yards total offense, including only 35 yards of passing offense, and managed only nine first downs as they were all but eliminated from contention in the SEC Western Division race.

=== Alabama ===
	1	2	3	4	Total
#15 Tigers	0	14	8	0	22
Crimson Tide	3	6	6	0	15

This in-state rivalry known as the Iron Bowl is considered one of the most bitter and intense in all of sports. The Tigers traveled to Tuscaloosa for only the sixth time, but kept their winning streak alive having never lost there. Auburn has currently won the last five meetings against Alabama and 13 of the last 21 games against the Crimson Tide, but Alabama still leads the series 38–32–1.

Alabama scored first, on a first quarter field goal by Jamie Christensen. However, the Tide had marched inside the Auburn five-yard line, but was unable to get into the end zone. Two fumble recoveries deep in Alabama territory in the second quarter forced by Auburn's Quentin Groves enabled the Tigers to score touchdowns on short drives. Auburn running back Brad Lester ran for twelve yards to score first, with 11:12 to go in the quarter. Then, with 9:39 to go in the period, Kenny Irons rushed for eight yards to put the Tigers up 14–3. Alabama pulled to within five points late in the first half on a 52-yard touchdown pass from John Parker Wilson to Nikita Stover, making the score 14–9 at halftime.

In the third quarter, Alabama went ahead on a 13-yard touchdown pass from Wilson to Travis McCall, making the score 15–14. Alabama's second consecutive two-point conversion attempt was unsuccessful. Auburn scored the decisive touchdown with 1:28 remaining in the third quarter, when sophomore receiver Prechae Rodriquez caught a 22-yard touchdown pass from Tigers quarterback Brandon Cox to retake the lead at 20–15. A halfback option pass from Auburn's Carl Stewart to Lee Guess for a successful two-point conversion provided the final margin.

=== Nebraska (Cotton Bowl Classic) ===
	1	2	3	4	Total
#10 Tigers	7	7	3	0	17
#22 Cornhuskers	7	7	0	0	14

Auburn's strong regular season led them to be invited to play Nebraska in the 71st annual Cotton Bowl Classic. While the Tigers managed just 178 yards total offense against Nebraska and their two touchdown drives totalled just 23 yards, the Tigers defeated the Cornhuskers 17–14. Quarterback Brandon Cox completed 10 of his 21 pass attempts for 111 yards, and senior running back Kenny Irons rushed for 72 yards on 24 carries in his final college game as the Tigers finished the season with a record of 11–2. Senior wide receiver Courtney Taylor capped off his college career by catching six passes for 70 yards, and during the game set the all-time Auburn career record for pass receptions. Nebraska finished the season with a record of 9–5.

Fullback Carl Stewart scored both of the Tigers' touchdowns. The first score came in the first quarter on a 9-yard touchdown pass from Cox, and was set up by a 53-yard interception return by linebacker Karibi Dede. Stewart's second touchdown came on a one-yard rush in the second quarter. The Tigers' drive began at the Cornhuskers' 14-yard line after an unsuccessful fake punt. Senior placekicker John Vaughn's 42-yard field goal in the third quarter provided the winning points for the Tigers.

The Tigers played the Cotton Bowl Classic without three players whose suspensions were announced by head coach Tommy Tuberville in December: linebackers Kevin Sears and Tray Blackmon, and running back Brad Lester.

- Cotton Bowl Classic Outstanding Offensive Player: Courtney Taylor WR
- Cotton Bowl Classic Outstanding Defensive Player: Will Herring LB

== Depth chart ==
Starters and backups.

Defense

FS
Tristan Davis
Aaron Savage
Josh Hebert

WLB	MLB	SLB
⋅	Karibi Dede	⋅
Merrill Johnson	Kevin Sears	⋅
Chris Evans	Courtney Harden	⋅

SS
Eric Brock
Steve Gandy
Lorenzo Ferguson

CB
David Irons
Jerraud Powers
Patrick Lee

DE	DT	DT	DE
Quentin Groves	Chris Browder	Josh Thompson	Marquies Gunn
Antonio Coleman	Sen'Derrick Marks	Tez Doolittle	Octavius Balkcom
⋅	⋅	Pat Sims	Brandon Haley

CB
Jonathan Wilhite
Montavis Pitts
Walter McFadden

Offense

WR
Rodgeriqus Smith
Prechae Rodriguez
Ulysses Alexander

LT	LG	C	RG	RT
King Dunlap	Ben Grubbs	Joe Cope	Tim Duckworth	Jonathan Palmer
Oscar Gonzalez	Tyronne Green	Jason Bosley	Leon Hart	Antwoin Daniels
⋅	⋅	⋅	Nathan Farrow	Andrew McCain

TE
Cole Bennett
Tommy Trott
Gabe McKenzie

WR
Courtney Taylor
Montez Billings
James Swinton

QB
Brandon Cox
Blake Field
⋅

RB
Kenny Irons
Brad Lester
Ben Tate

FB
Carl Stewart
Tre Smith
Mike McLaughlin

Special teams
PK John Vaughn
PK Zach Kutch
P Kody Bliss
P Patrick Martyn

== Postseason awards ==
=== Major Awards ===
- Lou Groza Award Finalist: John Vaughn

=== All-Americans ===
- Ben Grubbs, OG – ESPN.com, Pro Football Weekly First Team, Associated-Press Second Team

SEC Special Teams Player of the Year: John Vaughn

=== Associated Press All-SEC team ===
All-SEC First Team:

- Quentin Groves, DE
- John Vaughn, PK
- Ben Grubbs, OG

All-SEC Second Team:

- Kenny Irons, RB
- Tim Duckworth, OG
- Kody Bliss, P

=== Coaches All-SEC team ===
All-SEC First Team:

- Kenny Irons, RB
- Tim Duckworth, OG
- Quentin Groves, DE
- John Vaughn, PK

All-SEC Second Team:

- Ben Grubbs, OG
- Will Herring, LB
- David Irons, CB
- Kody Bliss, P

Freshman All-SEC Football Team

- Sen'Derrick Marks, DT
- Jerraud Powers, DB
- Aairon Savage, DB

=== NFF National Honor Society ===
Three members of Auburn's 2006 senior class were among the inaugural inductees into the National Football Foundation National Honor Society, a recognition program for players who excel both on the field and in the classroom.

- Kody Bliss
- Will Herring
- Karibi Dede
