= Sam Olajubutu =

American gridiron football player (born 1983)

No. 43
- Position: Linebacker

Personal information
- Born: November 15, 1983 (age 42); LaGrange, Georgia, U.S.
- Listed height: 5 ft 8 in (1.73 m)
- Listed weight: 227 lb (103 kg)

Career information
- College: Arkansas
- NFL draft: 2007: undrafted

Career history
- Tampa Bay Buccaneers (2007); Saskatchewan Roughriders (2008)

Awards and highlights
- 2× First-team All-SEC (2005, 2006)

Sam Olajubutu (born November 15, 1983) is an American former football linebacker. He was signed by the Tampa Bay Buccaneers as an undrafted free agent in 2007. He played college football at Arkansas.

== Early life ==
Olajubutu attended LaGrange High School, where as a senior, he garnered all-state honors and was named Georgia’s 3A Defensive Player of the Year and West Georgia Player of the Year. In addition, he was named the 4A region player of the year as well as the LaGrange Daily News’ Player of the Year. He was selected to the All-Columbus Ledger-Enquirer squad. He earned 170 tackles in his senior season in leading his team to the state championship. Rivals.com ranked him as the No. 54 prep outside linebacker in the nation. He finished third in the state in wrestling in 2001. He was ranked No. 1 in the state in the 215-pound weight class in wrestling as a senior. He was beaten by Brandon Puckett in the 2002 state wrestling championship.

Despite his production, Olajubutu was not recruited by Georgia, instead only garnering SEC scholarship offers from Mississippi State and Arkansas.

== College career ==
Olajubutu played at the University of Arkansas, where he started 40 games and became just the 14th player in school history to eclipse 300 tackles. He finished with 372 tackles, seven sacks, four forced fumbles and two interceptions and was an All-SEC first-team choice in each of his last two years.

=== Freshman (2002, 2003) ===
As a true freshman in 2002, Olajubutu played in three games and recorded two tackles. He later would apply for and receive a medical redshirt, allowing four more years of participation. As a redshirt freshman in 2003, Olajubutu recorded 85 total tackles, including three tackles for loss and two interceptions.

=== Sophomore ===
In 2004, Olajubutu recorded 45.5 tackles, including 3.5 tackles for a loss of seven yards, four passes defended, and a fumble recovery.

=== Junior ===
Opening the season against Missouri State, Olajubutu had ten tackles and was named one of three Hogwired.com Players of Week. Against #1 Southern Cal, Olajubutu had 14 tackles. The following week, the junior had 16 tackles and two sacks against #20 Alabama. His breakout game was against #20 Auburn, when he had 18 tackles, two tackles for loss, a sack, a quarterback hurry, and a pass deflected.

His efforts made Olajubutu an Honorable Mention All-American by College Football News.com. He also was a first-team All-SEC selection by SEC coaches, and tabbed on the All-SEC second team by the Associated Press in 2005. He ranked third in the SEC with 118 tackles. As a junior, Olajubutu was named to the Rotary Lombardi Award Watch List.

=== Senior ===
==== Pre-season ====
Prior to the 2006 season, Olajubutu was tagged on watch lists for the Lott Trophy, Lombardi Award, Chuck Bednarik Award, Bronko Nagurski Trophy, and Butkus Award. Rivals.com also named Olajubutu as a second-team All-American prior to 2006. CollegeFootballNews.com named the senior the #3 Linebacker in the Nation and the No. 11 SEC Position Player, and The Birmingham News said Olajubutu was the SEC’s Best Outside Linebacker. Eight separate organizations named Olajubutu as a first-team All-SEC performer.

The senior linebacker had six tackles and a sack in the Red-White scrimmage on April 8.

==== 2006 season ====
Olajubutu recorded 12 tackles against Southern Cal and 13 against Utah State. He recorded 14 stops in a win at Vanderbilt. Following a victory over #2 Auburn, Olajubutu was named a mid-season All-American, recording 66 tackles in the first five games After missing the game against Louisiana-Monroe with an injury, Olajubutu returned to action against the South Carolina Gamecocks and recorded three tackles in a win. The following week against #13 Tennessee, the senior linebacker had eight tackles, a sack, and a forced fumble as the Hogs won 31-14. A victory over Mississippi State gave the Hogs the SEC Western Division title and a berth in the 2006 SEC Championship Game. Against #4 Florida, Olajubutu recorded six tackles, all unassisted, but the Razorbacks lost 38-28. Olajubutu would record three tackles in the 2007 Capital One Bowl, his final game as an Arkansas Razorback.

==== Following the season ====
Olajubutu was named First-team All-SEC by the Associated Press, SEC Coaches, and Scout.com. He also was a Bednarik Award Semifinalist, Butkus Award Semifinalist, and Lott Trophy Quarterfinalist. He was invited to play in the East–West Shrine Game, along with teammate Keith Jackson (defensive tackle).

== 2007 NFL draft ==
The NFL Combine placed his height at 5'8. He was listed as a safety on some draft boards. Olajubutu would go undrafted.
