= 2007 Cotton Bowl Classic =

2007 AT&T Cotton Bowl Classic
- 71st Cotton Bowl Classic
- The Cotton Bowl in Dallas, Texas, hosted the Cotton Bowl Classic.
Auburn Tigers	Nebraska Cornhuskers
(10–2)	(9–4)
SEC	Big 12
17	14
Head coach: Tommy Tuberville	Head coach: Bill Callahan
AP / Coaches / BCS; 10 / 10 / 9	AP / Coaches / BCS; 22 / 22 / 23
	1	2	3	4	Total
Auburn	7	7	3	0	17
Nebraska	7	7	0	0	14
- Date: January 1, 2007
- Season: 2006
- Stadium: Cotton Bowl
- Location: Dallas, Texas
- MVP: LB Will Herring (Auburn); WR Courtney Taylor (Auburn)
- Referee: Todd Geerlings (Big Ten)
- Attendance: 66,777

United States TV coverage
- Network: FOX
- Announcers: Pat Summerall, Brian Baldinger, and Krista Voda

The 2007 AT&T Cotton Bowl Classic was a college football bowl game played on January 1, 2007, at the Cotton Bowl in Dallas, Texas. The Cotton Bowl Classic was part of the 2007 NCAA Division I FBS football season and one of 32 games in the 2006–07 bowl season. The bowl game featured the Auburn Tigers versus the Nebraska Cornhuskers.

== Background ==
This was Auburn's first Cotton Bowl Classic since 1986, and Nebraska's first since 1980.

== Game summary ==
The game was tied at halftime. Nebraska scored first on a Nate Swift touchdown catch from Zac Taylor. For Auburn, Carl Stewart caught a touchdown pass from Brandon Cox to tie the score. Stewart ran for a touchdown to give Auburn the lead early in the second quarter, but Nebraska tied it up with a Brandon Jackson touchdown four minutes later. John Vaughn ended up winning the game a 42-yard field goal in the third quarter, as the two teams did not score from that point on. Both teams had two turnovers and six punts. Despite outgaining Auburn 230–178 and having less penalties and more first downs, Nebraska could not get into position to score, especially late in the fourth quarter, when they did not try a field goal at the Auburn 30 on fourth down with four minutes to play.
