= King Dunlap =

American football player (born 1985)

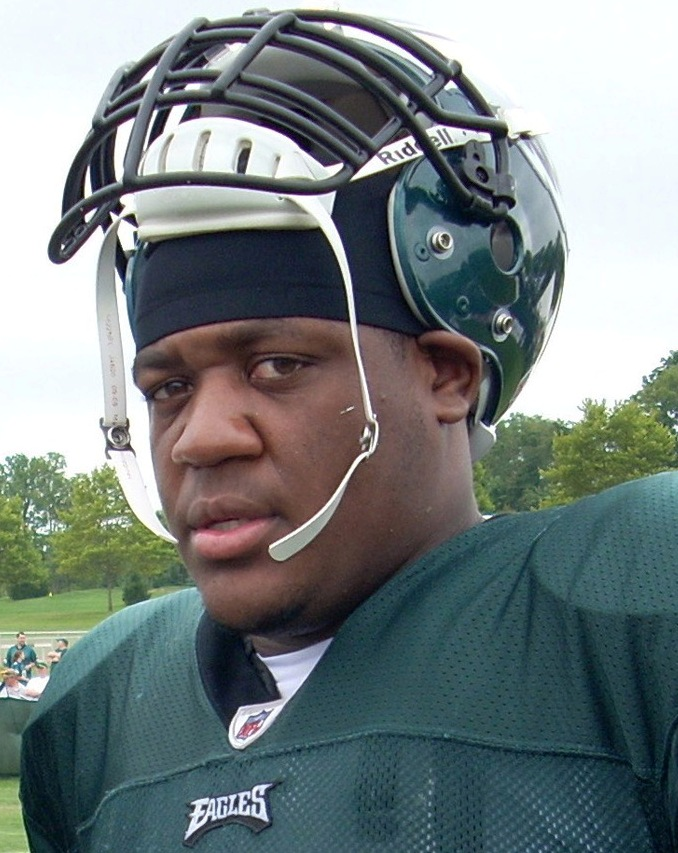
- Dunlap with the Philadelphia Eagles in 2010

No. 65, 77
- Position: Offensive tackle

Personal information
- Born: September 14, 1985 (age 41); Nashville, Tennessee, U.S.
- Listed height: 6 ft 9 in (2.06 m)
- Listed weight: 330 lb (150 kg)

Career information
- High school: Brentwood Academy (Brentwood, Tennessee)
- College: Auburn (2003–2007)
- NFL draft: 2008: 7th round, 230th overall pick

Career history
- Philadelphia Eagles (2008–2012); San Diego Chargers (2013–2016)

Career NFL statistics
- Games played: 98
- Games started: 65
- Stats at Pro Football Reference

King David Dunlap V (born September 14, 1985) is an American former professional football player who was an offensive tackle in the National Football League (NFL). He played college football for the Auburn Tigers, and was selected by the Philadelphia Eagles in the seventh round of the 2008 NFL draft. He also played for the San Diego Chargers.

== Early life ==
Dunlap played high school football and basketball at Brentwood Academy near Nashville, Tennessee.

== College career ==
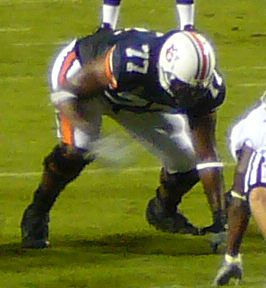
Dunlap in 2007.

Dunlap played college football at Auburn University. Dunlap started in place of starting left tackle Marcus McNeill in a game against Ball State in 2005 after McNeill suffered an injury. Dunlap, along with Jonathan Palmer, replaced Marcus McNeill and Troy Reddick as the starting offensive tackles for Auburn in 2006. He started in all 13 games at left tackle in 2006. He was named SEC Offensive Lineman of the Week after a game against Tulane on October 21 in which he received a 99 percent offensive line grade.

== Professional career ==
Going into his senior year in 2007, Dunlap was considered to be one of the top offensive tackle prospects in the 2008 NFL draft. However, due to his poor senior season, his draft stock dropped.

Pre-draft measurables
Height	Weight	Arm length	Hand span	40-yard dash	10-yard split	20-yard split	20-yard shuttle	Three-cone drill	Vertical jump	Bench press	Wonderlic
6 ft 8 1/2 in (2.04 m)	310 lb (141 kg)	35 1/2 in (0.90 m)	10 in (0.25 m)	5.28 s	1.81 s	2.99 s	5.12 s	8.05 s	30.0 in (0.76 m)	21 reps	32
Shuttle, 3-cone and vertical values from Pro Day workout on March 10, 2008; all other values from 2008 NFL Scouting Combine

=== Philadelphia Eagles ===
Dunlap was selected by the Philadelphia Eagles with the 230th pick overall in the seventh round of the 2008 NFL draft. He signed a four-year contract with the team on June 17, 2008. He suffered an ankle injury in the preseason and was placed on injured reserve on August 30, ending his season.

Dunlap played in twelve games in the 2009 season and saw significant playing time in a game against the Oakland Raiders after starting left tackle Jason Peters suffered a knee injury during the first quarter.

Dunlap took over for Peters in Week 5 against the San Francisco 49ers in 2010 after Peters suffered a knee injury. Dunlap gave up three sacks in the game. He made his first NFL start on October 17, 2010, in a Week 6 game against the Atlanta Falcons due to Peters's injury. Dunlap's main assignment was to block defensive end John Abraham, who made zero sacks in the game. With Peters out again for a Week 7 game against the Tennessee Titans, Dunlap again started in place of him. Dunlap, however, suffered a bone bruise and a hyperextension of his knee during the game, and was replaced by left guard Todd Herremans. Dunlap was did not play in Weeks 9 and 10 due to his injuries. In a Week 13 game against the Houston Texans on December 2, starting right tackle Winston Justice hyperextended his knee and Dunlap took over for him. Dunlap started his first game at right tackle in place of Justice in a Week 14 game against the Dallas Cowboys on December 12. He started again in Week 15 against the New York Giants in place of Justice at right tackle. Dunlap started in a Week 17 matchup against the Cowboys due to the Eagles' decision to rest starters before their playoff run. During the wild card playoff game against the Green Bay Packers, Dunlap was inserted at right tackle to replace Justice, who had three penalties and ineffective play.

On October 2, 2011, Dunlap blocked a field goal against the San Francisco 49ers. He became an unrestricted free agent following the 2011 season, but was re-signed to a one-year contract on March 30, 2012.

=== San Diego Chargers ===
On March 12, 2013, Dunlap signed a two-year contract with the San Diego Chargers.

In 2014, Dunlap played all 16 games and starting all of them for the first time in his career, while only allowing three sacks. He was voted by his teammates as the Chargers' Lineman of the Year in 2014.

On February 20, 2015, the Chargers re-signed Dunlap to a four-year, $28 million contract.

On March 13, 2017, Dunlap was released by the Chargers. On June 12, Dunlap announced his retirement from the NFL after nine seasons.

== Personal life ==
Dunlap's father, King Dunlap IV, is a former defensive tackle for Tennessee State and the Baltimore Colts, who drafted him in the fifth round of the 1969 NFL/AFL draft. His mother, Robin, is a former track star at Tennessee State and his younger sister, Victoria, is a starting forward on the Kentucky Wildcats women's basketball team and a member of the track team, competing in the high jump. He also has a younger brother named George, who is a graduate of Welch College and is now the assistant coach of the men's basketball team, the Welch College Flames. Dunlap's lifelong friend, former Alabama Crimson Tide linebacker Darren Mustin, is the godfather to Dunlap's son, King Dunlap VI. Dunlap has a daughter who was born in August 2007. Dunlap earned a degree in adult education from Auburn.

On March 4, 2011, Dunlap was arrested and charged with reckless driving and disorderly conduct for driving his 2004 Cadillac Escalade onto the sidewalk and pulling up outside the front doors of Nashville's Bridgestone Arena, who was hosting the SEC women's basketball tournament, to pick up his father who was in a wheelchair. It was reported the police asked Dunlap to move the vehicle to the street and offered to help assist his father, but Dunlap refused and was subsequently arrested.

On February 16, 2017, Dunlap was arrested in Nashville for violating a protective order against his girlfriend and causing a domestic disturbance.
