= Tim Duckworth =

Tim Duckworth may refer to:

- Tim Duckworth (American football)
- Tim Duckworth (decathlete)
