= Arron Sears =

American football player (born 1984)

No. 78
- Position: Guard

Personal information
- Born: October 25, 1984 (age 42); Russellville, Alabama, U.S.
- Listed height: 6 ft 3 in (1.91 m)
- Listed weight: 319 lb (145 kg)

Career information
- High school: Russellville
- College: Tennessee
- NFL draft: 2007: 2nd round, 35th overall pick

Career history
- Tampa Bay Buccaneers (2007–2009)

Awards and highlights
- PFWA All-Rookie Team (2007); First-team All-American (2006); Jacobs Blocking Trophy (2006); 2× First-team All-SEC (2005, 2006)

Career NFL statistics
- Games played: 31
- Games started: 31
- Fumble recoveries: 1
- Stats at Pro Football Reference

Arron Eugene Sears (born October 25, 1984) is an American former professional football player who was a guard in the National Football League (NFL). He played college football for the Tennessee Volunteers and was selected by the Tampa Bay Buccaneers in the second round of the 2007 NFL draft.

== Early life ==
Sears attended Russellville High School in Russellville, Alabama. He was considered a top high school prospect and was invited to participate in the U.S. Army All-American Bowl. Sears was also named the 5A lineman of the year in Alabama by High School Sports Magazine.

== College career ==
Sears was a starter at the University of Tennessee after taking over at the end of his freshman year against Mississippi State. He started at several positions on the offensive line but mostly at tackle. During his career, Sears received All-America and All-SEC honors. He was a team captain on the 2006 Tennessee Volunteers football team. He has an older brother (Kevin Sears) who played linebacker for Auburn University, and they faced each other twice in the 2004 season.

== Professional career ==
Sears was named the Buccaneers' starter at left guard from Week 1 and did not disappoint, garnering a selection to the 2007 NFL All-Rookie Team for his efforts.

Arron Sears started all 31 of his career games in his two seasons in the NFL.

On June 2, 2009, it was reported that Sears had a neurological condition sustained from a concussion. The extent of the injury was unknown, but early reports said it was possibly severe enough to be career-threatening. He would ultimately leave the team and not return.

Sears was waived by the Buccaneers on April 26, 2010.

== Personal life ==
By age 27, Sears felt a "total loss of function" and was said to have swings of anger that could be a risk to others. He was held for a mental health evaluation after being found wandering on the highway in 2010. Sears sued the NFL and the Buccaneers in 2012 because of the head trauma he experienced in his career leaving him unable to care for himself.

== Honors ==
- 2006 Jacobs Award (SEC's top Blocker)
- 2006 All-America – AFCA(1st team), Rivals.com (3rd team)
- 2005 All-SEC – Coaches and Associated Press (1st team)
- SEC Offensive Lineman of the Week (October 3, 2005)
- 2003 Freshman All-SEC – Coaches and Knoxville News Sentinel (1st team)
