= 2005 All-SEC football team =

American college football all-star team

The 2005 All-SEC football team consists of American football players selected to the All-Southeastern Conference (SEC) chosen by the Associated Press (AP) and the conference coaches for the 2005 NCAA Division I-A football season.

The Georgia Bulldogs won the conference, beating the LSU Tigers 34 to 14 in the SEC Championship.

Vanderbilt quarterback Jay Cutler was voted AP SEC Offensive Player of the Year. Alabama linebacker Demeco Ryans, a unanimous selection by both AP and the coaches, was voted AP SEC Defensive Player of the Year.

== Offensive selections ==
=== Quarterbacks ===
- Jay Cutler, Vanderbilt (AP-1, Coaches-1)
- D. J. Shockley, Georgia (AP-1, Coaches-2)
- Chris Leak, Florida (AP-2)

=== Running backs ===
- Kenny Irons*, Auburn (AP-1, Coaches-1)
- Darren McFadden, Arkansas (AP-1, Coaches-1)
- Kenneth Darby, Alabama (AP-2, Coaches-1)
- Jerious Norwood, Miss. St. (AP-2, Coaches-2)
- Rafael Little, Kentucky (Coaches-2)

=== Wide receivers ===
- Sidney Rice, South Carolina (AP-1, Coaches-1)
- Chad Jackson, Florida (AP-1, Coaches-2)
- Earl Bennett, Vanderbilt (AP-2, Coaches-1)
- D. J. Hall, Alabama (AP-2)
- Tyrone Prothro, Alabama (Coaches-2)

=== Centers ===
- Mike Degory, Florida (AP-1, Coaches-1)
- Rudy Niswanger, LSU (AP-2, Coaches-2)

=== Guards ===
- Max Jean-Gilles†, Georgia (AP-1, Coaches-1)
- Tim Duckworth, Auburn (AP-2, Coaches-2)
- Kyle Roper, Arkansas (AP-2)
- Will Arnold, LSU (Coaches-2)

=== Tackles ===
- Marcus McNeill†, Auburn (AP-1, Coaches-1)
- Arron Sears, Tennessee (AP-1, Coaches-1)
- Andrew Whitworth#, LSU (AP-1, Coaches-1)
- Tre' Stallings, Ole Miss (Coaches-1)
- Daniel Inman, Georgia (AP-2, Coaches-2)
- Randy Hand, Florida (AP-2, Coaches-2)
- Brian Stamper, Vanderbilt (Coaches-2)

=== Tight ends ===
- Leonard Pope*, Georgia (AP-1, Coaches-1)
- Dustin Dunning, Vanderbilt (AP-2, Coaches-2)

== Defensive selections ==
=== Defensive ends ===
- Willie Evans, Miss. St. (AP-1, Coaches-1)
- Quentin Moses, Georgia (AP-1, Coaches-1)
- Jeremy Mincey, Florida (AP-2, Coaches-2)
- Parys Haralson, Tennessee (AP-2, Coaches-2)
- Marquies Gunn, Auburn (AP-2)
- Mark Anderson, Alabama (Coaches-2)

=== Defensive tackles ===
- Claude Wroten, LSU (AP-1, Coaches-1)
- Kyle Williams, LSU (AP-1, Coaches-2)
- Jason Hall, Tennessee (AP-2)
- Keith Jackson, Arkansas (AP-2)
- Justin Harrell, Tennessee (AP-2)
- T. J. Jackson, Auburn (AP-2)

=== Linebackers ===
- DeMeco Ryans†, Alabama (AP-1, Coaches-1)
- Patrick Willis, Ole Miss (AP-1, Coaches-1)
- Moses Osemwegie, Vanderbilt (AP-1, Coaches-1)
- Sam Olajubutu, Arkansas (AP-2, Coaches-1)
- Freddie Roach, Alabama (AP-2, Coaches-2)
- Kevin Simon, Tennessee (AP-2, Coaches-2)
- Travis Williams, Auburn (AP-2, Coaches-2)
- Omar Gaither, Tennessee (Coaches-2)

=== Cornerbacks ===
- Dee Webb, Florida (AP-1, Coaches-2)
- DeMario Minter, Georgia (AP-1, Coaches-2)
- Tim Jennings, Georgia (AP-1)
- David Irons, Auburn (AP-2)
- Johnathan Joseph, South Carolina (AP-2)

=== Safeties ===
- Greg Blue†, Georgia (AP-1, Coaches-1)
- Ko Simpson*, South Carolina (AP-1, Coaches-1)
- LaRon Landry, LSU (AP-2, Coaches-1)
- Roman Harper, Alabama (Coaches-1)
- Muhammed Abdullah, Kentucky (AP-2, Coaches-2)
- Will Herring, Auburn (AP-2, Coaches-2)

== Special teams ==
=== Kickers ===
- Brandon Coutu*, Georgia (AP-1, Coaches-1)
- Chris Hetland, Florida (AP-2, Coaches-2)

=== Punters ===
- Kody Bliss, Auburn (AP-1, Coaches-1)
- Gordon Ely-Kelso, Georgia (AP-2, Coaches-2)

=== All purpose/return specialist ===
- Skyler Green, LSU (AP-2, Coaches-1)
- Rafael Little, Kentucky (AP-1)
- Felix Jones, Arkansas (Coaches-2)

== Key ==
Bold = Consensus first-team selection by both the coaches and AP

AP = Associated Press

Coaches = Selected by the SEC coaches

* = Unanimous selection of AP

# = Unanimous selection of Coaches

† = Unanimous selection of both AP and Coaches

== See also ==
- 2005 College Football All-America Team
