= 2006 All-SEC football team =

American college football all-star team

The 2006 All-SEC football team consists of American football players selected to the All-Southeastern Conference (SEC) chosen by the Associated Press (AP) and the conference coaches for the 2006 college football season.

The Florida Gators won the conference, beating the Arkansas Razorbacks 38 to 28 in the SEC Championship. The Gators then won a national championship, defeating the Big Ten champion Ohio State Buckeyes 41 to 14 in the BCS National Championship Game.

Arkansas running back Darren McFadden, a unanimous selection by both AP and the coaches, was voted the AP SEC Offensive Player of the Year. Ole Miss linebacker Patrick Willis, a unanimous selection by the coaches, was voted AP SEC Defensive Player of the Year.

== Offensive selections ==
=== Quarterbacks ===
- JaMarcus Russell, LSU (AP-1, Coaches-1)
- Andre Woodson, Kentucky (AP-2, Coaches-2)
- Chris Leak, Florida (Coaches-2)

=== Running backs ===
- Darren McFadden†, Arkansas (AP-1, Coaches-1)
- BenJarvus Green-Ellis, Ole Miss (AP-1, Coaches-2)
- Kenny Irons, Auburn (AP-2, Coaches-1)
- Felix Jones, Arkansas (AP-2, Coaches-2)

=== Wide receivers ===
- Robert Meachem, Tennessee (AP-1, Coaches-1)
- Earl Bennett, Vanderbilt (AP-1, Coaches-2)
- Dwayne Bowe, LSU (AP-2, Coaches-1)
- Dallas Baker, Florida (Coaches-1)
- Keenan Burton, Kentucky (AP-2, Coaches-2)
- D. J. Hall, Alabama (Coaches-2)
- Sidney Rice, South Carolina (Coaches-2)

=== Centers ===
- Jonathan Luigs, Arkansas (AP-1, Coaches-1)
- Steve Rissler, Florida (Coaches-1)
- Nick Jones, Georgia (AP-2, Coaches-2)

=== Guards ===
- Ben Grubbs, Auburn (AP-1, Coaches-2)
- Tim Duckworth, Auburn (AP-2, Coaches-1)
- Will Arnold, LSU (AP-2)
- Stephen Parker, Arkansas (AP-2)

=== Tackles ===
- Arron Sears*, Tennessee (AP-1, Coaches-1)
- Tony Ugoh, Arkansas (AP-1, Coaches-1)
- Daniel Inman, Georgia (AP-1)
- Zac Tubbs, Arkansas (AP-1, Coaches-1)
- Michael Oher, Ole Miss (AP-2)
- Brian Johnson, LSU (AP-2)
- Phil Trautwein, Florida (Coaches-2)
- Antoine Caldwell, Alabama (Coaches-2)
- Michael Aitcheson, Kentucky (Coaches-2)

=== Tight ends ===
- Jacob Tamme, Kentucky (AP-1, Coaches-1)
- Martrez Milner, Georgia (AP-2, Coaches-1)
- Andy Boyd, South Carolina (Coaches-2)
- Richard Dickson, LSU (Coaches-2)

== Defensive selections ==
=== Defensive ends ===
- Quentin Groves, Auburn (AP-1, Coaches-1)
- Jamaal Anderson, Arkansas (AP-1, Coaches-1)
- Turk McBride, Tennessee (AP-1)
- Titus Brown, Miss. St (AP-2, Coaches-2)
- Charles Johnson, Georgia (AP-2, Coaches-2)
- Derrick Harvey, Florida (Coaches-2)
- Tyson Jackson, LSU (Coaches-2)

=== Defensive tackles ===
- Glenn Dorsey, LSU (AP-1, Coaches-1)
- Ray McDonald, Florida (Coaches-1)
- Keith Jackson, Arkansas (AP-2)
- DelJuan Robinson, Miss. St. (AP-2)
- Antwain Robinson, Arkansas (Coaches-2)

=== Linebackers ===
- Patrick Willis#, Ole Miss (AP-1, Coaches-1)
- Sam Olajubutu, Arkansas (AP-1, Coaches-1)
- Quinton Culberson, Miss. St. (AP-1, Coaches-1)
- Earl Everett, Florida (AP-2, Coaches-1)
- Jasper Brinkley, South Carolina (AP-1)
- Wesley Woodyard, Kentucky (Coaches-1)
- Brandon Siler, Florida (AP-2, Coaches-2)
- Tony Taylor, Georgia (AP-2, Coaches-2)
- Will Herring, Auburn (Coaches-2)
- Jonathan Goff, Vanderbilt (Coaches-2)
- Ali Highsmith, LSU (Coaches-2)

=== Cornerbacks ===
- Simeon Castille, Alabama (AP-1, Coaches-1)
- Ryan Smith, Florida (AP-1, Coaches-2)
- Chris Houston, Arkansas (AP-2, Coaches-2)
- Jonathan Wade, Tennessee (AP-2, Coaches-2)
- Fred Bennett, South Carolina (Coaches-2)
- David Irons, Auburn (Coaches-2)

=== Safeties ===
- Reggie Nelson, Florida (AP-1, Coaches-1)
- LaRon Landry, LSU (AP-1, Coaches-1)
- Tra Battle, Georgia (AP-2, Coaches-1)
- Jonathan Hefney, Tennessee (AP-2, Coaches-2)
- Derek Pegues, Miss. St. (Coaches-2)

== Special teams ==
=== Kickers ===
- James Wilhoit, Tennessee (AP-1, Coaches-1)
- John Vaughn, Auburn (AP-1, Coaches-1)
- Ryan Succop, South Carolina (Coaches-2)

=== Punters ===
- Britton Colquitt, Tennessee (AP-1, Coaches-1)
- Kody Bliss, Auburn (AP-2, Coaches-2)

=== All purpose/return specialist ===
- Keenan Burton, Kentucky (AP-1)
- Mikey Henderson, Georgia (Coaches-1)
- Felix Jones, Arkansas (AP-2, Coaches-2)
- Craig Davis, LSU (Coaches-2)

== Key ==
Bold = Consensus first-team selection by both the coaches and AP

AP = Associated Press

Coaches = Selected by the SEC coaches

* = Unanimous selection of AP

# = Unanimous selection of Coaches

† = Unanimous selection of both AP and Coaches

== See also ==
- 2006 College Football All-America Team
