= Bubba Miller =

American football player (born 1973)

No. 65
- Position: Center

Personal information
- Born: January 24, 1973 (age 53); Nashville, Tennessee, U.S.
- Listed height: 6 ft 1 in (1.85 m)
- Listed weight: 305 lb (138 kg)

Career information
- High school: Brentwood Academy (Brentwood, Tennessee)
- College: Tennessee
- NFL draft: 1996: undrafted

Career history
- Philadelphia Eagles (1996–2001); New Orleans Saints (2002)

Awards and highlights
- First-team All-SEC (1995); Second-team All-SEC (1994)

Career NFL statistics
- Games played: 58
- Games started: 23
- Receptions: 2
- Receiving yards: 20
- Stats at Pro Football Reference

Stephen DeJuan "Bubba" Miller (born January 24, 1973) is an American former professional football player who was an offensive lineman in the National Football League (NFL) for the Philadelphia Eagles. He played college football for the Tennessee Volunteers.

== Early life ==
Miller attended Brentwood Academy near Nashville, Tennessee, during his high school years, where he helped the Brentwood Eagles win multiple state championships.

== Professional career ==
Miller signed with the Philadelphia Eagles as an undrafted free agent on April 27, 1996.

== Post-playing career ==
Miller became the host of a radio show called "The Bubba Miller Show" on August 4, 2003.

Miller was a commentator during the All American Football League's inaugural draft on January 28, 2008.
