= Shannon Doepking =

American softball coach

Current position
- Title: Head coach
- Team: Syracuse
- Conference: ACC
- Record: 150–157–1 (.489)

Biographical details
- Born: Acton, California, U.S.
- Education: Tennessee

Playing career
- 2005–2008: Tennessee
- Position: Catcher

Coaching career (HC unless noted)
- 2010: Brentwood Academy (asst.)
- 2011–2012: Fairleigh Dickinson (asst.)
- 2013: Stony Brook (asst.)
- 2014: Amherst College
- 2015–2018: Dartmouth
- 2019–Present: Syracuse

Head coaching record
- Overall: 256–247–2 (.509)
- Tournaments: NCAA: 0–2 (.000)

Accomplishments and honors

Championships
- 2× Ivy League Regular Season Champions (2015, 2018); Ivy League Tournament Champions (2015); Ivy League North Division Champions (2015)

Awards
- 2× Ivy League Coach of the Year (2015, 2018)

Shannon Doepking is an American, former collegiate right-handed softball catcher and current head coach at Syracuse. She played her college softball at Tennessee, helping them to a runner up finish at the 2007 Women's College World Series.

== Playing career ==
Doepking was a standout softball player during her four-year career at the University of Tennessee, earning a reputation for her strong arm as a catcher and ability to catch runners stealing. She was part of the Tennessee Volunteers team that made three consecutive appearances in the Women's College World Series from 2005–07 and was an All-SEC catcher. She was also a motivator for her team, helping to guide the pitcher and outfield and control the pace of the game. Doepking started 95% of her games in college and was a strong hitter as well.

After graduating, Doepking was the 15th overall pick in the 2008 National Pro Fastpitch draft by the Akron Racers. She played professionally for the Tennessee Diamonds, USSSA Pride, and Chicago Bandits, winning a title with Chicago.

== Coaching career ==
=== Amherst ===
Doepking served as head coach at Amherst College for one year, and led the program to a 21–11 record.

=== Dartmouth ===
On August 5, 2014, Doepking was named the new head coach of the Dartmouth softball program.

=== Syracuse ===
On September 14, 2018, Doepking was named the new head coach of the Syracuse Orange softball program.

== Head coaching record ==
=== College ===
Record table
| Season | Team | Overall | Conference | Standing | Postseason |
|---|---|---|---|---|---|
Amherst College (New England Small College Athletic Conference) (2014)
| 2014 | Amherst | 21–11 | 6–6 | 3rd (West) | |
| Amherst: | | 21–11 (.656) | 6–6 (.500) | | |
Dartmouth Big Green (Ivy League) (2015–2018)
| 2015 | Dartmouth | 25–18 | 16–4 | 1st (North) | NCAA Regional |
| 2016 | Dartmouth | 27–15 | 15–5 | 2nd (North) | |
| 2017 | Dartmouth | 11–28–1 | 10–10 | T-2nd (North) | |
| 2018 | Dartmouth | 22–18 | 16–5 | 1st | |
| Dartmouth: | | 85–79–1 (.518) | 57–24 (.704) | | |
Syracuse Orange (Atlantic Coast Conference) (2019–Present)
| 2019 | Syracuse | 20–32 | 8–16 | 5th (Atlantic) | |
| 2020 | Syracuse | 10–10 | 2–1 | T-4th | Season canceled due to COVID-19 |
| 2021 | Syracuse | 20–24 | 12–20 | 8th | |
| 2022 | Syracuse | 26–21 | 7–15 | 9th | |
| 2023 | Syracuse | 19–25–1 | 7–15–1 | 9th | |
| 2024 | Syracuse | 28–23 | 9–15 | T–8th | |
| 2025 | Syracuse | 27–22 | 6–18 | T–13th | |
| Syracuse: | | 150–157–1 (.489) | 51–100–1 (.339) | | |
| Total: | | 256–247–2 (.509) | | | |
National champion Postseason invitational champion Conference regular season champion Conference regular season and conference tournament champion Division regular season champion Division regular season and conference tournament champion Conference tournament champion
