= Brentwood Academy =

Private high school in Tennessee, United States

Location
- 219 Granny White Pike; Brentwood, Williamson, Tennessee 37027; United States; 36.0331798°N 86.8217969°W

Information
- Type: Private, Independent, College Preparatory
- Motto: Latin: Vivat Veritas (Let Truth Prevail)
- Religious affiliation: Christian
- Established: 1969
- Founders: Bill Brown
- Chairman: Buddy Bacon
- Campus Director: Andy Bradshaw (Upper School); Susan Cobb (Middle School)
- Head of school: Jenny Cretin (Interim)
- Teaching staff: 140
- Grades: 6–12
- Gender: Coeducational
- Enrollment: 770 (2025)
- Student to teacher ratio: 17:1
- Schedule type: A/B Block Schedule
- Campus size: 50 acres
- Colors: Red , White , and Blue
- Athletics conference: TSSAA Division II
- Nickname: Eagles
- Accreditation: NACAC, Cognia, SAIS, ERB, SACS, College Board
- Publication: Triangle (Alumni magazine); Flight (Literary Magazine)
- Yearbook: Aerie
- Website: www.brentwoodacademy.com

Brentwood Academy is a coeducational Christian independent college preparatory school located in Brentwood, Tennessee, for grades 6–12.

== History ==
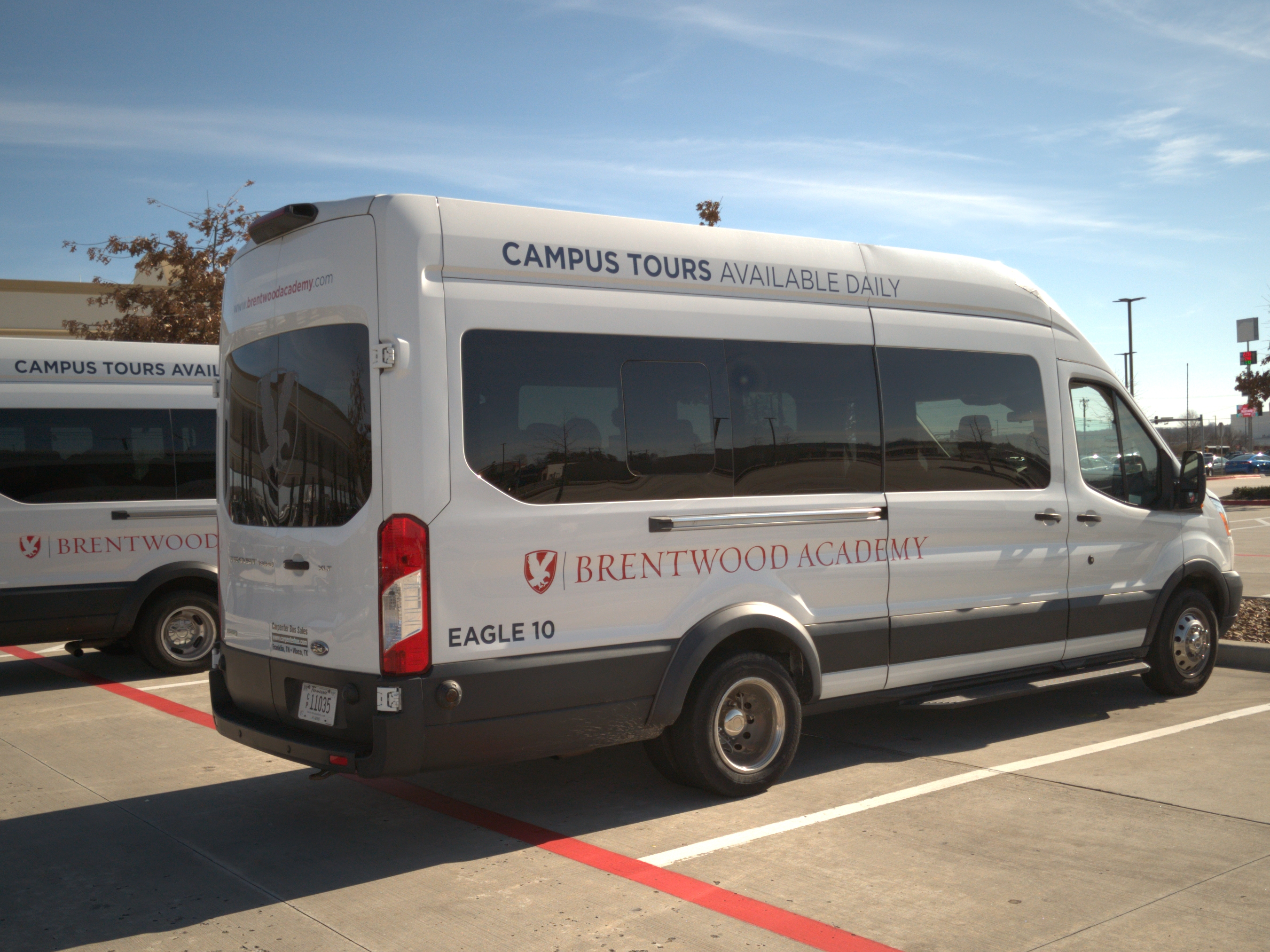
School busses from Brentwood Academy

The charter of Brentwood Academy was signed on November 20, 1969, after ten acres of land on Granny White Pike was gifted by Tom P. Kennedy, Jr.

Brentwood Academy was among a wave of private schools formed in response the court ordered desegregation of public schools. Brentwood Academy's leaders claimed the school was established to provide a sound, Christian education in a safer environment, but the sociologist Jennifer Dyer has argued that the school's stated objectives were simply a "guise" for the school's actual objective of allowing white parents to avoid enrolling their children in racially integrated public schools. Despite the school's claim that it was not founded for the purpose of racial segregation, it did not enroll any Black students until 1974, and did not have a Black graduate until 1980.

Applications to Brentwood Academy increased in 1980 after court rulings expanded desegregation busing in Nashville. At the time, only four of Brentwood Academy's 360 students were black.

In 2001, Brentwood Academy was a party in the United States Supreme Court case Brentwood Academy v. Tennessee Secondary School Athletic Association. The academy had sued the Tennessee Secondary School Athletic Association after the school was penalized for "undue influence" in recruiting football players, and the case was appealed to the Supreme Court. The court in this case held that a statewide association, incorporated to regulate interscholastic athletic competition among public and private schools, is regarded as engaging in state action when it enforces a rule against a member school.

In 2017, Brentwood Academy was accused of telling their staff not to report child abuse, including the rape of a 12-year-old child. The charges were later dismissed.

== Notable people ==
=== Football ===
- Tremayne Allen, football player
- Kent Austin, Canadian Football League (CFL) player and coach
- Derek Barnett, NFL defensive end for the Cleveland Browns
- Woody Baron, football player
- Kody Bliss, football player
- Ryan Carrethers, football player
- King Dunlap, former professional football player for the Philadelphia Eagles and San Diego Chargers
- Camron Johnson, football player
- Dawson Knox, tight end for Ole Miss and the Buffalo Bills.
- Mike MacIntyre, football coach
- Bubba Miller, football player
- Jalen Ramsey, professional football player for the Pittsburgh Steelers
- C. J. Sanders, football player
- Barry Turner, football player
- John Vaughn, football player
- Scott Wells, retired professional football player

=== Other athletes ===
- Andrew Bumbalough, middle and long distances in track runner
- Blades Brown, golfer
- Shannon Doepking, softball player and coach
- Victoria Dunlap, basketball player
- David Harrison, basketball player
- Darius Garland, basketball player for the Cleveland Cavaliers of the NBA
- Bryce Jarvis, MLB relief pitcher for the Arizona Diamondbacks
- Nicholas Nevid, swimmer
- Jacob Stallings, MLB catcher for the Colorado Rockies
- Brandan Wright, former NBA player for the Memphis Grizzlies

=== Musicians ===
- Ashlyne Huff, singer-songwriter and dancer
- Dann Huff, musician
- Gordon Kennedy, musician
- Holly Williams, recording artist

=== Faculty ===
- Jason Mathews, football player and coach
- Rhonda Blades, basketball player and coach
- John Pierce, basketball player and coach
- Hubie Smith, Tennessee High School Hall of Fame basketball coach
- James Wilhoit, football player, coach
