= Kody Bliss =

American gridiron football player (born 1985)

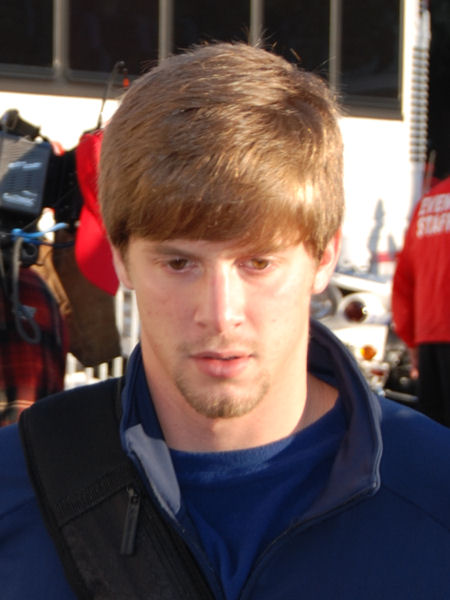
- Bliss before the 2007 AT&T Cotton Bowl Classic

Profile
- Position: Punter

Personal information
- Born: February 21, 1985 (age 41); Enid, Oklahoma, U.S.
- Listed height: 5 ft 11 in (1.80 m)
- Listed weight: 177 lb (80 kg)

Career information
- High school: Brentwood Academy (Brentwood, Tennessee)
- College: Auburn

Career history
- Edmonton Eskimos (2007)*; Team Alabama (2008)
- * Offseason or practice squad member only

Awards and highlights
- First-team All-SEC (2005); Second-team All-SEC (2006)

Kody Andrew Bliss (born February 21, 1985) is an American former football punter. He attended Brentwood Academy in Brentwood, Tennessee before signing in 2003 to play collegiately at Auburn University. He is currently an emergency medicine resident physician at LSUHSC Baton Rouge Emergency Medicine program in Baton Rouge, LA.

== College career ==
While at Auburn, Bliss was on the Ray Guy Award watchlist in 2006, his senior year. During that season, he led the Southeastern Conference with 46.1 yards per punt and also had 12 downed inside the 20-yard line. This performance earned him second team All-SEC honors from the AP and the SEC Coaches. He also finished first-team all-SEC in 2005. He also earned SEC Special Teams Player of the Week against LSU.

During his career at Auburn, Bliss totalled 202 punts for 8,861 yards. He finished with a 43.9 yard per punt average, the highest average in Auburn's history at the time and only passed in 2018 by Arryn Siposs. Bliss' career long was a 71 yard boot versus Tulane, but he had punts of over 60 yards in all four seasons.

DraftShowcase.com ranked Bliss as the second best punter available for the 2007 NFL draft, while Scout.com have him as the 4th overall. After a strong showing in the 82nd annual East-West Shrine Game, USA Today wrote that "Bliss can punt long, high and with accuracy. If any punter is selected in this draft, Bliss is among the first three with a chance".

== Pro career ==
=== CFL ===
Despite the ratings, Bliss went undrafted by the NFL and subsequently signed with the Canadian Football League's Edmonton Eskimos. Bliss was ultimately unable to unseat longtime Eskimos veteran and native-Canadian Sean Fleming to make the roster and was released on June 23, 2007.

=== AAFL ===
Bliss was among those protected by the All American Football League's Team Alabama.

== Personal life ==
Bliss was among the inaugural class of 345 inductees into the National Football Foundation's National Honor Society, a recognition program for players who excel both on the field and in the classroom. Bliss graduated with a degree in marketing and earned a 3.45 cumulative GPA.

Bliss graduated with a Doctor of Medicine from the University of Alabama School of Medicine in 2017 and subsequently began residency training in Emergency Medicine at LSUHSC Baton Rouge Emergency Medicine program in Baton Rouge, LA.

== See also ==
- 2006 Auburn Tigers football team
- 2005 Auburn Tigers football team
- 2004 Auburn Tigers football team
- 2003 Auburn Tigers football team
