= Cooper Wallace =

American football player (born 1982)

No. 89
- Position: Tight end

Personal information
- Born: April 26, 1982 (age 44); Nashville, Tennessee, U.S.
- Listed height: 6 ft 3 in (1.91 m)
- Listed weight: 258 lb (117 kg)

Career information
- College: Auburn
- NFL draft: 2006: undrafted

Career history
- Chicago Bears (2006)*; Tennessee Titans (2006-2007); Cincinnati Bengals (2007)*; San Francisco 49ers (2008)*
- * Offseason or practice squad member only

Awards and highlights
- Second-team All-SEC (2004)

Career NFL statistics
- Receptions: 1
- Receiving yards: 6
- Stats at Pro Football Reference

Cooper Wallace (born April 26, 1982) is an American former professional football player who was a tight end in the National Football League (NFL). He played college football for the Auburn Tigers and was signed by the Chicago Bears as an undrafted free agent in 2006.

== Early life and college career ==
Wallace attended high school at Christ Presbyterian Academy in Nashville, Tennessee. He attended Auburn University, where he was a starter for three of his four seasons with the Tigers.

== Professional career ==
Wallace was signed preseason with the Chicago Bears but was waived and subsequently signed with the Titans. On December 12, 2006, Wallace replaced defensive end Antwan Odom on the active roster in order to provide depth at the tight end position, since starting tight end Bo Scaife was out with an ankle injury.

After being released by the Titans at the end of the preseason in 2007, Wallace worked out for the Denver Broncos in October and eventually signed to the practice squad of the Cincinnati Bengals on November 6. He was not retained by the Bengals at the end of the 2007 season and on January 14, 2008, signed with the San Francisco 49ers. He was later released by the 49ers on August 25, 2008, to cut down their roster size.
