= Keith Jackson (defensive tackle) =

American football player (born 1985)

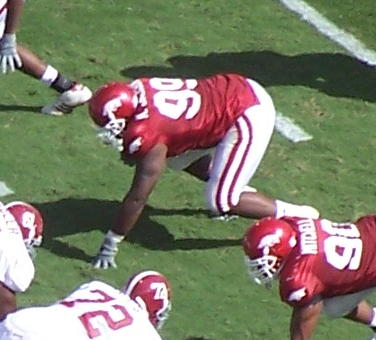
- Jackson with Arkansas in 2006

No. 90
- Position: Defensive tackle

Personal information
- Born: February 25, 1985 (age 41); Little Rock, Arkansas, U.S.
- Listed height: 6 ft 0 in (1.83 m)
- Listed weight: 305 lb (138 kg)

Career information
- High school: McClellan (Little Rock)
- College: Arkansas (2003–2006)
- NFL draft: 2007: 7th round, 248th overall pick

Career history
- St. Louis Rams (2007)*; San Diego Chargers (2007–2008)*
- * Offseason or practice squad member only

Awards and highlights
- 2× Second-team All-SEC (2005, 2006)

Keith Jerome Jackson, Jr. (born February 25, 1985) is an American former football defensive tackle. He was selected by the St. Louis Rams in the seventh round of the 2007 NFL draft. He played college football at Arkansas. He is the son of former NFL Pro Bowl tight end Keith Jackson.

== High school ==
Jackson was a member of the Associated Press Arkansas Super Team as a senior. As a junior nose guard, he made 76 tackles with 50 unassisted stops while recording 4.5 sacks and three fumble recoveries. As a junior fullback he rushed for 880 yards and 13 touchdowns. As a senior, he had 80 tackles (eight for loss) and eight sacks. He was a member of the PrepStar All-Region VI Team.

== College career ==
For the Arkansas Razorbacks, Jackson played in 44 games with 26 starts and posted 191 tackles (109 solo) with 7.0 sacks, 18.5 tackles for loss, 23 quarterback hurries, and two career interceptions including one returned for a touchdown.

In 2003, he was initially targeted for a redshirt season, but he was called into action in the fourth game of the season on the Hogs’ defensive front. He earned 12 tackles, a forced fumble and a fumble recovery in his eight games, helping Arkansas to a 9–4 record and a 2003 Independence Bowl victory. In 2004, he saw action at defensive tackle in all 11 games during his sophomore season. He made his first career start at defensive tackle in the Hogs’ 49–20 win over Louisiana-Monroe. He tallied 26 tackles, including 4.5 tackles for loss and two sacks. He made at least one stop in 10 of 11 games, but the Razorbacks fell to 5–6 and missed a bowl game. In 2005 Jackson started all 11 games, and posted an All-SEC season as a junior. He was named Second-team All-SEC by The Associated Press after he racked up 74 tackles, including 44 solo stops, including 6.5 TFL and six quarterback hurries. He also netted 2.5 sacks, but Arkansas failed to reach a bowl for the second year in a row, finishing 4–7. Jackson repeated his All-SEC designation in 2006 and started all 14 games at right defensive tackle and totaled career-high 79 tackles and posted two interceptions, including one returned 69 yards for a touchdown. He helped Arkansas finish the season 10–4 and win the 2006 SEC West Division championship, but the team fell to Wisconsin in the 2007 Capital One Bowl on New Year's Day.

== Professional career ==
Pre-draft measurables
Height	Weight	Arm length	Hand span	40-yard dash	10-yard split	20-yard split	20-yard shuttle	Three-cone drill	Vertical jump	Bench press
6 ft 0 1/4 in (1.84 m)	305 lb (138 kg)	32 1/2 in (0.83 m)	8 7/8 in (0.23 m)	4.85 s	1.65 s	2.81 s	4.56 s	7.65 s	30.0 in (0.76 m)	33 reps
All values from NFL Combine/Pro Day

Jackson was selected by the St. Louis Rams in the seventh round of the 2007 NFL draft with the 248th overall pick. July 9, 2007, he signed a three-year contract with the Rams. He was cut on September 7, 2007, and signed to the Rams practice squad. On September 19, 2007, Jackson was released from the Rams practice squad and on November 20, 2007, the San Diego Chargers signed him to their practice squad.

Jackson was re-signed by the Chargers on January 29, 2008. He was cut from the team on August 30, 2008.

== Personal life ==
On June 5, 2009, Jackson was arrested in Little Rock on drug charges.
