= Travis Williams (linebacker) =

American football player and coach (born 1983)

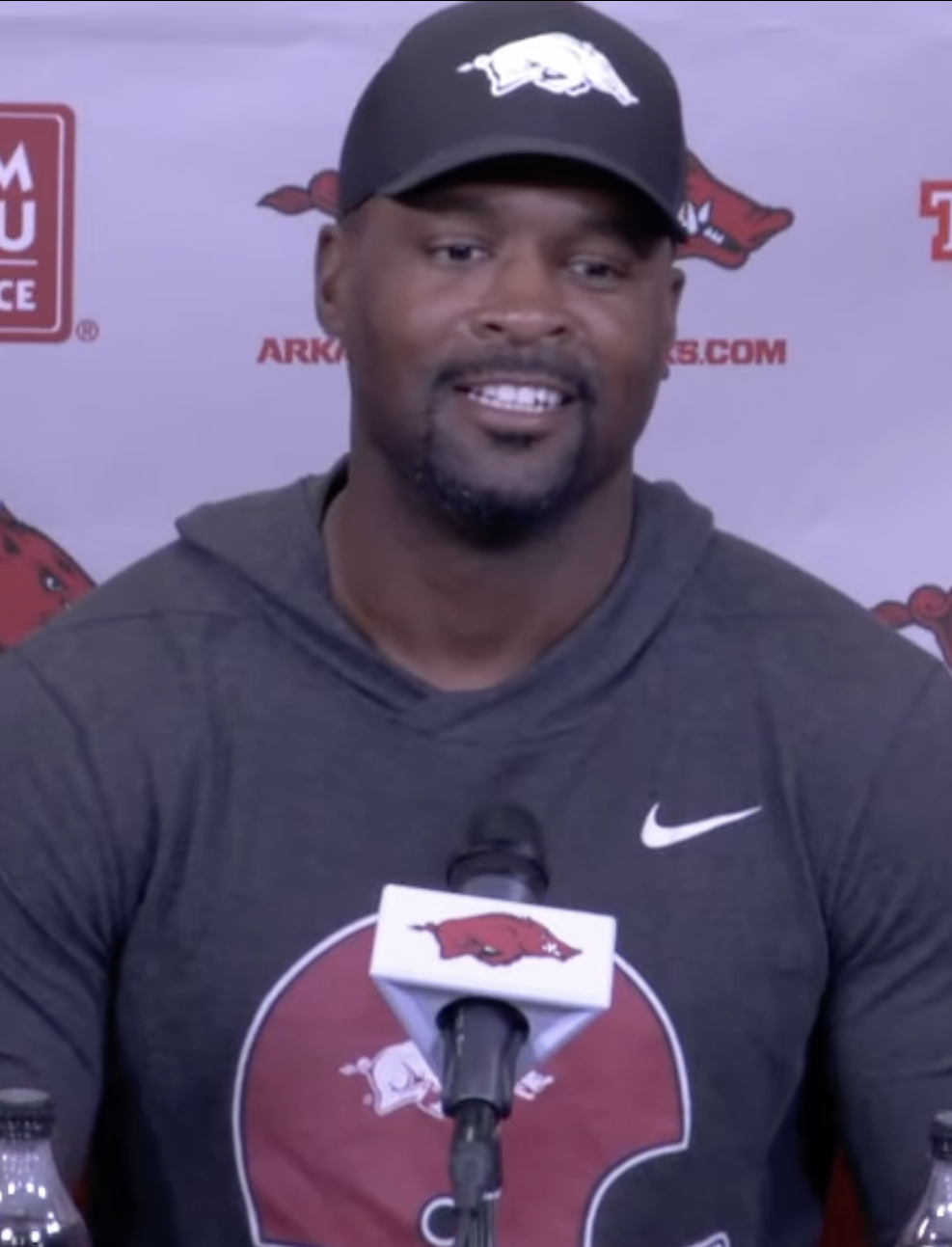
- Williams in 2025

Current position
- Title: Linebackers coach
- Team: Texas A&M
- Conference: SEC

Biographical details
- Born: January 20, 1983 (age 43); Columbia, South Carolina, U.S.

Playing career
- 2001–2005: Auburn
- 2007: Atlanta Falcons
- Position: Linebacker

Coaching career (HC unless noted)
- 2009–2011: Auburn (GA)
- 2012: Northern Iowa (LB)
- 2013: Creekside HS (GA) (DC)
- 2014–2015: Auburn (def. analyst)
- 2016–2018: Auburn (LB)
- 2019–2020: Auburn (co-DC/LB)
- 2021–2022: UCF (DC)
- 2023–2025: Arkansas (DC)
- 2026–present: Texas A&M (LB)

Accomplishments and honors

Awards
- 2× Second-team All-SEC (2004, 2005); Auburn All-Decade Team; Senior Bowl 2006

Travis Williams (born January 20, 1983) is an American football coach and a former linebacker who is currently the linebackers coach at Texas A&M University. He was most recently the defensive coordinator for the University of Arkansas, a position he held from 2023 until game 5 of the 2025 season when he was fired. He played college football for the Auburn Tigers and professionally for the Atlanta Falcons of the National Football League (NFL). He also coached for Auburn, Northern Iowa, Creekside High School, and UCF.

== Early life ==
Williams played high school football at Spring Valley High School in Columbia, South Carolina. He played college football for the Auburn Tigers, where he started at linebacker on the Tigers undefeated 2004 team.

== Coaching career ==
Following his playing career, Williams returned to the Auburn Tigers as a graduate assistant under head coach Gene Chizik in 2009. Chizik was Auburn's defensive coordinator during Williams' collegiate career. Williams served as a graduate assistant from 2009-2011, where he was on staff when Auburn won the 2010 National Championship. Following the 2011 season, Williams left Auburn for Northern Iowa as the linebackers coach. Williams was defensive coordinator at Creekside High School in Fairburn, Georgia for the 2013 season before returning to Auburn in 2014 as a defensive analyst. Williams was promoted to Auburn's linebacker coach following the 2015 season.

On February 17, 2021, Williams reunited with Gus Malzahn to serve as the defensive coordinator at UCF.

In December 2022, Williams was announced as the new defensive coordinator at Arkansas, replacing the departing Barry Odom. In Williams first years at Arkansas, he helped defense end Landon Jackson have a break out year. In the summer of 2024, Williams went viral for his rapping skills. During Week 4 of that year, he would be given a game ball for his coaching performance in a win against Auburn.

In 2025, Arkansas' defense regressed. After winning their first two games against Alabama A&M and Arkansas State, Arkansas lost close road games versus Ole Miss and Memphis. On September 27, the Razorbacks were blown out at home by the Notre Dame Fighting Irish, 56–13. Williams' defense struggled in the loss, as players were often out of position and did not tackle well. On September 28, Arkansas head coach Sam Pittman was fired, and offensive coordinator Bobby Petrino was named the interim head coach. On September 29, Petrino fired Williams, along with co-DC Marcus Woodson and D-Line coach Deke Adams.

== Music career ==
Williams is also a musician and rapper. He has released many demos and songs including the unofficial pump-up song of the Auburn Football team, "Tiger Walk"
