= Rodgeriqus Smith =

American gridiron football player (born 1985)

No. 80
- Position: Wide receiver

Personal information
- Born: September 8, 1985 (age 41); St. Petersburg Florida
- Listed height: 6 ft 1 in (1.85 m)
- Listed weight: 195 lb (88 kg)

Career information
- College: Auburn
- NFL draft: 2009: undrafted

Career history
- San Diego Chargers (2009)*; Hamilton Tiger-Cats (2009)*
- * Offseason or practice squad member only

Rodgeriqus Smith (born September 8, 1985, in Snellville, Georgia) is an American former football wide receiver.

== College career ==
Smith attended Auburn University and walked-on the Tigers football team. Smith caught his first collegiate pass for 38 yards against Mississippi State during his freshman season. In Smith's sophomore season, he caught his first touchdown from 20 yards out against the same Mississippi State Bulldogs. Originally a walk-on, Smith was awarded a scholarship after the 2006 season. Smith finished 7th on Auburn's all-time receiving yards list with 1,598.

Class	Receptions	Yards	Touchdowns
Freshman	6	109	0
Sophomore	26	452	4
Junior	52	705	5
Senior	30	332	1

== Professional career ==
Smith signed with the Hamilton Tiger-Cats on October 27, 2009.
