= Brent Schaeffer =

American football player (born 1986)

No. 7
- Position: Quarterback

Personal information
- Born: January 25, 1986 (age 40); Deerfield Beach, Florida, U.S.
- Listed height: 6 ft 2 in (1.88 m)
- Listed weight: 205 lb (93 kg)

Career information
- High school: Deerfield Beach
- College: Ole Miss
- NFL draft: 2008: undrafted

Career history
- Central Valley Coyotes (2009)

Awards and highlights
- First-team JUCO All-America (2005); Co-Offensive Player of the Year (2005); SEC Newcomer of the Year (2006)

Brentis Jarryn Schaeffer (born January 25, 1986) is an American former Arena football quarterback. He played college football for the Ole Miss Rebels.

He also played college football at the University of Tennessee and College of the Sequoias.

== High school career ==
Schaeffer attended Deerfield Beach High School where he played high school football. As a junior in 2002, he passed for 2,574 yards and 31 touchdowns while recording 538 rushing yards and 15 rushing touchdowns. That year, he also attended the Elite 11 Quarterback camp. He also earned All-State Honorable mention honors. As a senior, he passed for 2,177 yards, 24 touchdowns, 397 rushing yards and 12 rushing touchdowns. That season, he was named the No. 11 overall prospect in Florida by the Miami Herald and the top prospect in Broward County. He was named to the Atlanta Journal-Constitution's Super Southern 100 team. He was rated by TheInsiders.com as a four-star prospect and the 14th-ranked quarterback in the nation. He was also rated by Rivals.com as a four-star prospect and the No. 7 rated dual-threat Quarterback in the nation. He was rated by SuperPrep as the No. 10 ranked Quarterback prospect in the nation and the No. 8 ranked overall prospect in Florida. He was a PrepStar All-America selection. He was also listed by recruiting expert Tom Lemming as the No. 16 ranked Quarterback prospect in the nation.

== College career ==
Schaeffer, a four-star quarterback recruit, received offers from several different schools, those schools included: Tennessee, Auburn, Kansas State, NC State, and South Florida. He visited Tennessee first on December 12, 2003, then Kansas State on December 19. His next visit was to South Florida on January 9, 2004. Followed by Auburn on January 16. His final visit was to NC State on January 23.

=== University of Tennessee ===
Schaeffer began his college career at the University of Tennessee, where he became the first true freshman quarterback to start a season opener for an SEC team since freshman eligibility was restored in 1973 and the first in 59 years. In the season opener against UNLV, he was 7 for 10 for 123 passing yards and one passing touchdown to go along with 29 rushing yards and a rushing touchdown. However, he was then replaced as the starter by Erik Ainge a few weeks later, then he broke his collarbone and missed the rest of the season. In April 2005, Schaeffer and another Tennessee player were involved in a fight in a dorm lobby. According to Sports Illustrated, Schaeffer was charged with misdemeanor assault and pleaded guilty to a lesser charge with a sentence of six months of judicial diversion. Head coach Phillip Fulmer then asked Schaeffer to be transferred to another school due to the unnecessary length of his "punishment".

=== College of the Sequoias ===
Schaeffer then transferred to the College of the Sequoias in 2005 and spent one year there. Where he was named First-team All-American and Co-Offensive Player of the Year by the California Community College Coaches Association as well as First-team All-America by J.C Gridwire. He was also a finalist for the Junior College National Player of the Year Award. He was rated the No. 1 JUCO Quarterback in the nations by Scout.com and CollegeFootballNews.com. He was rated the No. 1 JUCO Quarterback and No. 3 Overall JUCO player in the nation by Rivals.com. He was also rated the No. 1 JUCO player in the nation by SuperPrep and No. 2 JUCO player in the nation by CollegeFootballNews.com. For his season at College of the Sequoias, he passed for 2,970 yards and 40 touchdowns. He also rushed for 860 yards and 10 touchdowns.

Schaeffer, a five-star quarterback, received offers from Ole Miss, NC State, Virginia Tech, Wisconsin, Auburn, and Florida. He first visited NC State on December 2, 2005. Then a week later on December 9, he visited Wisconsin. He ended his visits by visiting Ole Miss on January 13, 2006. He signed his letter of intent on January 20. That same day, he announced at a press conference that he was transferring to the Ole Miss.

=== Ole Miss ===
Schaeffer then transferred to Ole Miss prior to the 2006 season and was named the team's starting quarterback, even before arriving to campus or being ruled academically qualified to play. He was expected, by head coach Ed Orgeron, to graduate from College of the Sequoias in June, which Schaeffer failed to do. So he returned to his home in Florida and enrolled in correspondence courses to complete the six academic hours he needed for admission to Ole Miss. However, the correspondence courses were taking too long due to their open ended dates, which Coach Orgeron said. "When you take correspondence courses, there's an open-ended date. Some of the courses were taking too long to complete. I didn't know if he could complete them by the time camp started." Schaeffer eventually did arrive and started all 12 games and completed 115-of-244 passes (47.1%) for 1,442 yards, nine touchdowns, 10 interceptions and a passer rating of 100.75. Then in 2007, he completed 35-of-93 passes (37.6%) for 578 yards, five touchdowns, four interceptions and a passer rating of 98.98. In the preseason, he was selected as the SEC's best Scrambler by Athlon.

=== Collegiate statistics ===
Year	Team	Passing									
Year	Team	GP	Comp	Att	Pct	Yards	Y/A	AY/A	TD	Int	Rating
2004	Tennessee	8	18	37	48.6	302	8.2	8.0	2	1	129.6
2006	Ole Miss	12	115	244	47.1	1442	5.9	4.8	9	10	100.7
2007	Ole Miss	6	35	93	37.6	578	6.2	5.4	5	4	99.0
Career		26	168	374	44.9	2,322	6.2	5.3	16	15	103.2

== Professional career ==
=== NFL draft ===
Schaeffer was projected as a wide receiver in the National Football League by NFLDraftScout.com, rated the 94th best out of 334 and was projected to go unselected in the draft. He went unselected in the 2008 NFL draft.

=== af2 ===
Schaeffer joined the af2 in 2008 and on December 16, 2008, he was assigned to the Central Valley Coyotes. However, on March 1, 2009, he was placed on the teams' Refused to Report list along with WR/DB Steve Gonzalez and OL/DL Earl Stephens.

== Personal life ==
Schaeffer is a cousin of former Iowa quarterback and Heisman Trophy runner-up Brad Banks.
