= Marquies Gunn =

American gridiron football player (born 1983)

Marquise Gunn
No. 79
- Position: Defensive end

Personal information
- Born: November 22, 1983 (age 42); Alexander City, Alabama, U.S.
- Listed height: 6 ft 4 in (1.93 m)
- Listed weight: 266 lb (121 kg)

Career information
- College: Auburn
- NFL draft: 2007: undrafted

Career history
- New York Giants (2007); Tampa Bay Buccaneers (2007–2008)*; New Orleans Saints (2008)*; Hamilton Tiger-Cats (2009); Alabama Hammers (2011)
- * Offseason or practice squad member only

Awards and highlights
- Second-team All-SEC (2005)

Marquise LaRoy Gunn (born November 22, 1983) is an American former football defensive end. He was signed by the New York Giants as an undrafted free agent in 2007. He played college football for the Auburn Tigers.

Gunn was also a member of the Tampa Bay Buccaneers and New Orleans Saints. He played in the Canadian Football League (CFL) for the Hamilton Tiger-Cats.

He attended Benjamin Russell High School in Alexander City, Alabama.
