= Courtney Taylor (gridiron football) =

American gridiron football player (born 1984)

No. 86
- Position: Wide receiver

Personal information
- Born: April 7, 1984 (age 42); Carrollton, Alabama, U.S.
- Listed height: 6 ft 3 in (1.91 m)
- Listed weight: 204 lb (93 kg)

Career information
- High school: Carrollton
- College: Auburn
- NFL draft: 2007: 6th round, 197th overall pick

Career history
- Seattle Seahawks (2007–2008); BC Lions (2011–2016)

Awards and highlights
- Freshman All-SEC (2003); 2007 AT&T Cotton Bowl Classic MVP

Career NFL statistics
- Receptions: 14
- Receiving yards: 136
- Receiving average: 9.7
- Stats at Pro Football Reference
- Stats at CFL.ca (archive)

Courtney Taylor (born April 7, 1984) is an American former professional football player who was a wide receiver in the National Football League (NFL). He played college football for the Auburn Tigers and was selected by the Seattle Seahawks in the sixth round of the 2007 NFL draft.

== Early life ==
Taylor attended Carrollton High School in Carrollton, Alabama where he lettered in football as a quarterback and cornerback.

== College career ==
Taylor played college football at Auburn University, where he was converted to wide receiver. He has the former school record for career receptions, right after Ryan Davis, with 153.

== Professional career ==
=== Seattle Seahawks ===
Taylor was drafted by the Seattle Seahawks in the sixth round of the 2007 NFL draft. He signed a four-year contract with the team on July 10, 2007. He made his NFL debut on September 16 and caught one pass for six yards. He became the Seahawks' starting wide receiver in 2008 to begin the season, but was demoted in week 4. He was released on October 8, and re-signed to the practice squad. After being re-signed in the offseason, Taylor was waived on September 5, 2009, during final cuts.

=== BC Lions ===
On October 12, 2011, Taylor signed a practice roster agreement with the BC Lions. In his first year in the CFL Taylor collected 264 receiving yards and 2 TDs. On May 24, 2013, Taylor agreed to a contract extension.

== Personal life ==
Taylor was diagnosed with multiple sclerosis during the 2008 offseason.
