= Carl Stewart (American football) =

American football player (born 1985)

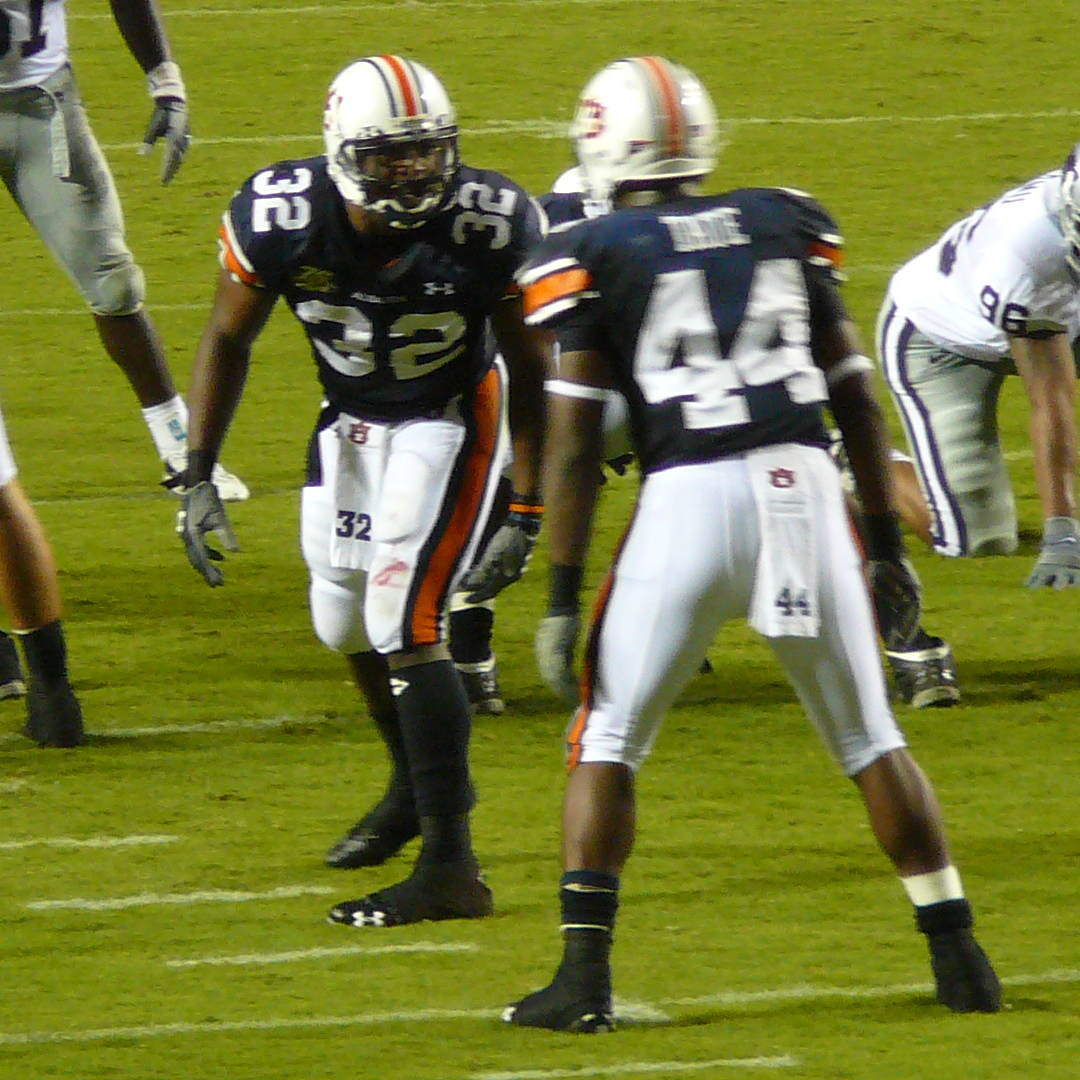
- Stewart (#32) with the Auburn Tigers in 2007

Profile
- Position: Fullback

Personal information
- Born: May 30, 1985 (age 41); Alcoa, Tennessee, U.S.
- Listed height: 6 ft 2 in (1.88 m)
- Listed weight: 230 lb (104 kg)

Career information
- High school: Maryville (Maryville, Tennessee)
- College: Auburn
- NFL draft: 2008: undrafted

Career history
- Tampa Bay Buccaneers (2008)*; San Francisco 49ers (2008)*
- * Offseason or practice squad member only

Carl Stewart (born May 30, 1985) is an American former professional football fullback. He was signed by the Tampa Bay Buccaneers as an undrafted free agent in 2008. He played college football for the Auburn Tigers.

== Early life ==
Stewart attended Maryville High School in Tennessee under head coach George Quarles. As a senior, he rushed for 1,585 yards on just 172 carries and a school-record 28 touchdowns in his senior year. In 2002, he led Maryville to their third consecutive class 4A state championship. As a junior, he rushed for 1,430 yards and 21 touchdowns on 158 carries. In the 2001 state title game he rushed for 173 yards on 23 carries with 3 touchdowns going on to be named the game’s MVP. He finished his career at Maryville High School with 3,491 rushing yards and 50 touchdowns, a school record at the time.

While in high school, Stewart earned the following accolades:

- named the Tennessee Class 4A Mr. Football Back of the Year
- Associated Press All-State first-team for all divisions
- Tennessee Sports Writers Association class 4A first-team All-state
- Orland Sentinel All-Southern Team
- rated the fourth best running back in the nation by ESPN/Tom Lemming* Knoxville News Sentinel Tennessee Top 25
- PrepStar All-Region selection

Stewart also competed in track and field under coach Mac Pickle while at Maryville, finishing second in the state in decathlon as a senior. Stewart also qualified for the state meet in the 100m, 110m hurdles, 400m, 200m, high jump, long jump, triple jump, discus, and shot put, but opted out of those competitions to compete in the state’s decathlon finals.

== College career ==
Stewart was seventh all-time at Auburn in receiving yards by a running back; he had 785 for his career. In 2006, he was named to the ESPN the Magazine Academic All-District IV First-team and to the All SEC second-team. He scored Auburn's only two touchdowns against Nebraska in the Cotton Bowl. In 2004, he scored his first career touchdown against the Citadel, along with 91 rushing yards on 7 carries.

Stewart participated in the 2008 NFL Scouting Combine. Stewart posted position-best results in the 225 lb Bench Press (30 Repetitions), Vertical Jump (39.5"), and Broad Jump (11' 02")

== Professional career ==
Stewart signed with the Tampa Bay Buccaneers as an undrafted free agent following the 2008 NFL draft on May 2, 2008. He was waived before the start of training camp on June 20, 2008. He re-signed with the team during training camp on July 30, 2008. He was waived during final roster cuts on August 30, 2008.

Stewart signed to the San Francisco 49ers' practice squad on December 10, 2008.
