= Karibi Dede =

American football player (born 1983)

Karibi "Kap" Dede
Current position
- Title: Linebacker Coach
- Team: Oklahoma State
- Conference: Big XII

Biographical details
- Born: May 8, 1983 (age 43); Woodbridge, Virginia, U.S.

Playing career
- 2002–2006: Auburn
- 2007: New York Giants*
- 2008: Montreal Alouettes*
- Position: Linebacker

Coaching career (HC unless noted)
- 2007: Berkmar HS (RB/LB)
- 2008-2010: Auburn HS (RB/LB)
- 2011–2012: Auburn (GA)
- 2013–2014: Woodbridge HS
- 2015-2016: Louisville (QC)
- 2017: Mississippi State (QC)
- 2018: Florida (QC)
- 2019: Arkansas (Sr. Analyst)
- 2020-2021: Colorado State (OLB)
- 2022: Charlotte (DB)
- 2023: Long Island (Co-DC/LB)
- 2024: Western Kentucky (Run Game Specialist/OLB)
- 2025: Oklahoma State (ILB)

Karibi "Kap" Dede (born May 8, 1983) is an American football coach and former player who serves as the Linebacker Coach for Oklahoma State. Dede played college football at Auburn University where he played safety and linebacker. He had a brief professional stint in the National Football League (NFL) and Canadian Football League (CFL).

== High school career ==
Dede attended C. D. Hylton High School where his team won 39 consecutive games and back to back 6A Virginia State Titles.

== College and professional career ==
Dede played at Auburn where he appeared in 50 games and had 32 starts. As a senior Dede was named a team captain. Following his college career Dede was not selected in the 2007 NFL draft, but was invited by the New York Giants to attend their rookie mini-camp and was subsequently signed as a free agent by the club. The Giants waived Dede on August 27, 2007. On March 1, 2008, it was announced Dede had signed with the Montreal Alouettes of the CFL. Dede sustained an injury during the preseason and was later waived by the club.

== Education ==
Dede is a graduate of Auburn University where he earned his Bachelors of Arts in Special Education, Masters of Arts in Special Education, and Ph.D. in Administration of Higher Education. Dede's doctoral dissertation examined "the Relationships Among Socioeconomic Status, Learning Disabilities, Academic Competence, and Social Fluency for Division I Student-Athletes."

== Honors ==
During his playing career at Auburn, Dede was selected to the All-SEC Honor Roll in 2003, 2004 and 2005. He was also named the undergraduate student of the year in the College of Education in 2005, and that same year selected as Auburn's nominee for the SEC Good Works Team. In 2006 Dede was named a semifinalist for the William V. Campbell Trophy (Academic Heisman) which is awarded to the American college football player with the best combination of academics, community service, and on-field performance. In 2007 Dede was a selected to the inaugural class of the National Football Foundation National Honor Society, a recognition for players who excel both on the field and in the classroom.
