= Will Herring =

American football player (born 1983)

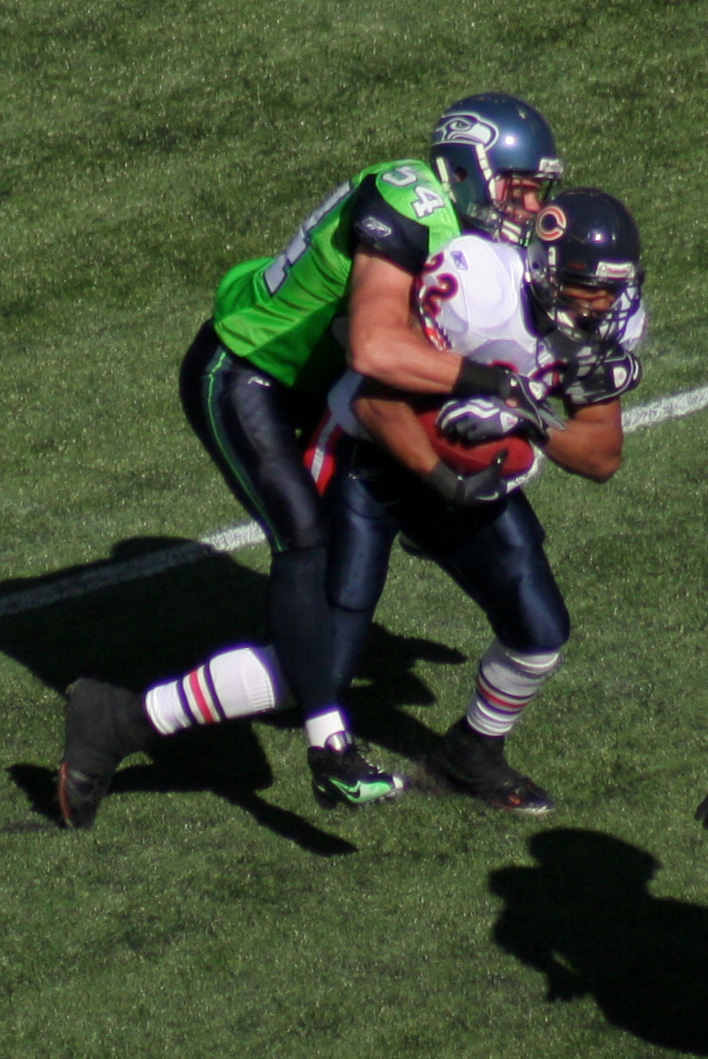
- Herring (No. 54), playing for the Seattle Seahawks, tackling Matt Forte (No. 22) of the Chicago Bears, in September 2009

No. 54
- Position: Linebacker

Personal information
- Born: August 28, 1983 (age 43); Opelika, Alabama, U.S.
- Listed height: 6 ft 3 in (1.91 m)
- Listed weight: 215 lb (98 kg)

Career information
- High school: Opelika
- College: Auburn
- NFL draft: 2007: 5th round, 161st overall pick

Career history
- Seattle Seahawks (2007–2010); New Orleans Saints (2011–2013); St. Louis Rams (2014)

Awards and highlights
- 2× Second-team All-SEC (2005, 2006); 2007 AT&T Cotton Bowl Classic MVP

Career NFL statistics
- Total tackles: 148
- Sacks: 1
- Forced fumbles: 3
- Fumble recoveries: 2
- Interceptions: 3
- Stats at Pro Football Reference

William Ronald Herring (born August 28, 1983) is an American former professional football player who was a linebacker in the National Football League (NFL). He played college football for the Auburn Tigers and was selected by the Seattle Seahawks in the fifth round of the 2007 NFL draft.

== College career ==
At Auburn University, Herring earned letters in 2003, 2004, 2005, and 2006 while playing safety before moving to outside linebacker his senior season. He held the school career record with 49 consecutive starts, which was broken by Offensive Left Tackle Lee Ziemba in 2010. He also led the team in tackles his junior and senior seasons.

== Professional career ==
=== Seattle Seahawks ===
He was drafted by the Seattle Seahawks in the fifth round of the 2007 NFL draft with the 161st overall pick. From 2007 through 2010, Herring played a pivotal role on special teams, and as a back-up outside linebacker for the Seahawks.

=== New Orleans Saints ===
After the 2010 season, Herring signed with the New Orleans Saints, to be not only a special teams threat like he was in Seattle, but to get more playing time at linebacker. He was cut by the Saints on March 12, 2013, and re-signed on March 21, 2013

=== St. Louis Rams ===
On March 13, 2014, he signed a one-year deal with the Dallas Cowboys. However, the deal was called off the next day.

On October 7, 2014, Herring was signed by the St. Louis Rams.

== NFL career statistics ==
Legend
**Bold**	Career high

=== Regular season ===
Year	Team	Games		Tackles					Interceptions					Fumbles			
Year	Team	GP	GS	Cmb	Solo	Ast	Sck	TFL	Int	Yds	TD	Lng	PD	FF	FR	Yds	TD
2007	SEA	12	0	13	11	2	0.0	0	0	0	0	0	0	0	0	0	0
2008	SEA	11	1	13	10	3	0.0	0	0	0	0	0	0	0	**1**	0	0
2009	SEA	**16**	**6**	**46**	**38**	**8**	0.0	**5**	0	0	0	0	1	**1**	**1**	0	0
2010	SEA	15	0	36	30	6	**1.0**	3	**1**	0	0	0	**2**	**1**	0	0	0
2011	NOR	11	1	9	8	1	0.0	0	**1**	0	0	0	1	0	0	0	0
2012	NOR	**16**	1	13	10	3	0.0	0	0	0	0	0	0	**1**	0	0	0
2013	NOR	**16**	1	14	11	3	0.0	0	**1**	**6**	0	**6**	1	0	0	0	0
2014	STL	12	0	4	4	0	0.0	0	0	0	0	0	0	0	0	0	0
		109	10	148	122	26	1.0	8	3	6	0	6	5	3	2	0	0

=== Playoffs ===
Year	Team	Games		Tackles					Interceptions					Fumbles			
Year	Team	GP	GS	Cmb	Solo	Ast	Sck	TFL	Int	Yds	TD	Lng	PD	FF	FR	Yds	TD
2007	SEA	**2**	0	2	0	**2**	0.0	0	0	0	0	0	0	0	0	0	0
2010	SEA	**2**	0	**7**	**6**	1	0.0	0	0	0	0	0	**1**	**1**	0	0	0
2013	NOR	**2**	0	1	1	0	0.0	0	0	0	0	0	0	0	0	0	0
		6	0	10	7	3	0.0	0	0	0	0	0	1	1	0	0	0

== Personal life ==
Herring was among the inaugural class of 345 inductees into the National Football Foundation National Honor Society, a recognition program for players who excel both on the field and in the classroom.
