= Brandon Cox =

American football player (born 1983)

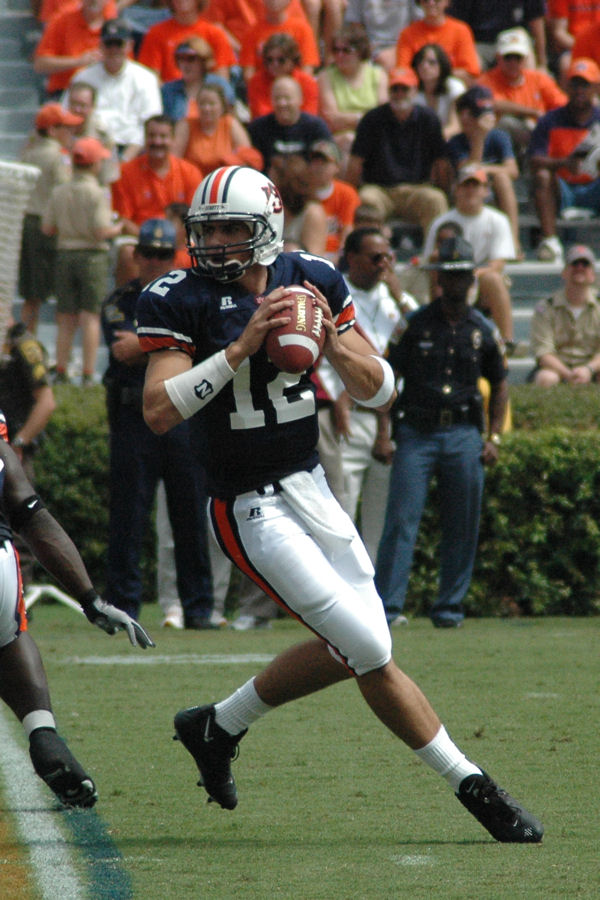
- Cox with the Auburn Tigers in 2004

No. 12
- Position: Quarterback

Personal information
- Born: October 31, 1983 (age 43); Trussville, Alabama, U.S.
- Listed height: 6 ft 2 in (1.88 m)
- Listed weight: 209 lb (95 kg)

Career information
- High school: Hewitt-Trussville, Trussville, Alabama
- College: Auburn (2004–2007)
- Stats at ESPN

Brandon Cox (born October 31, 1983) is an American former football quarterback, who played collegiately for Auburn University. As Auburn's starting quarterback from 2005 to 2007 he guided the Tigers to a 29–9 record and was a member of the winningest senior class in Auburn history, winning 50 games during their time on the Plains.

Cox attended Hewitt-Trussville High School, the same school as Jay Barker, former quarterback for rival Alabama. He was diagnosed with myasthenia gravis in his 10th grade year in high school, but fought the disease and continued to play football. Cox, a left-hander, was recruited to Auburn in 2003 but redshirted his freshman year.

After serving one season as backup, Cox stumbled to begin the 2005 season before leading the Tigers to a 9–3 finish. He returned his junior year in 2006 to lead Auburn to an 11–2 finish, including a victory over Nebraska in the 2007 Cotton Bowl Classic.

Cox began the season as the starter for the third season for the Tigers in 2007. Prior to the season, Cox was one of 35 quarterbacks named to the 2007 Manning Award Watch List. For much of the 2007 season, Cox struggled to find consistency behind an offensive line starting three freshmen. He was briefly benched in favor of true freshman quarterback Kodi Burns during the Mississippi State game. Cox rebounded from being benched to lead Auburn to victories over undefeated Florida, Arkansas and Alabama.

In winning the 2007 Iron Bowl over Alabama, 17–10, the team set a school record with six consecutive wins over its rival. Cox became only the second Auburn quarterback to be 3–0 against Alabama, with his predecessor, Jason Campbell, being the other quarterback to record this feat.

Cox's last win came in the 2007 Chick-fil-A Bowl when he led Auburn past Clemson, 23–20 (OT). Cox completed a career-high 25 passes, but it was Burns who ended the game with a touchdown run in overtime.

Cox finished the regular season of his senior year with a 117.58 passer rating. As of the 2007 Iron Bowl, Cox had 6,748 career passing yards, a 59.12% completion percentage (525/888), 42 touchdowns on 31 interceptions for a career NCAA passer rating of 131.58.

After leaving Auburn with a business administration degree, Cox became an account manager for Ready Mix USA. He later worked in the construction industry, serving as commercial leasing associate for Daniel Corporation and later the Director of Business Development for Hoar Construction.
