= Brad Lester =

American gridiron football player (born 1985)

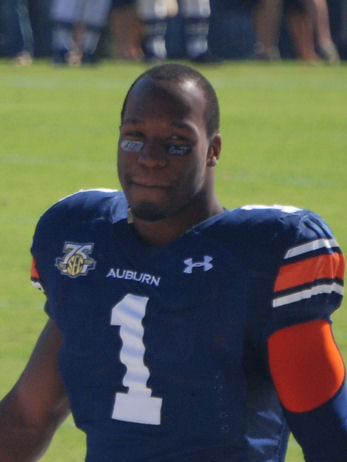

Profile
- Position: Running back

Personal information
- Born: October 24, 1985 (age 41); Lilburn, Georgia, U.S.
- Listed height: 5 ft 11 in (1.80 m)
- Listed weight: 197 lb (89 kg)

Career information
- High school: Parkview (Lilburn, Georgia)
- College: Auburn
- NFL draft: 2009: undrafted

Career history
- Edmonton Eskimos (2010); Georgia Rampage (2013)

Career CFL statistics
- Rush attempts: 16
- Rush yards: 96

Brad Lester (born October 24, 1985) is a former gridiron football running back. He played college football at Auburn University.

== Early life ==
Brad Lester was born to Phillis Miller and Calvin Lester. He attended Parkview High School in Georgia, playing alongside current Major League Baseball outfielder Jeff Francoeur.

== College career ==
Lester missed the 2007 Cotton Bowl as well as the first 5 games of the 2007 season due to concerns over his academic eligibility. Lester was seriously injured in a game against Mississippi State.

== Professional career ==
Lester went undrafted in the 2009 NFL draft. He worked out for the Houston Texans on August 6, 2009, after an injury to running back Jeremiah Johnson. Lester played the 2010 season with the Edmonton Eskimos of the Canadian Football League (CFL). In 2012, Lester signed with the Georgia Rampage of the Ultimate Indoor Football League (UIFL) for their 2013 season.
