= Quentin Groves =

American football player (born 1984)

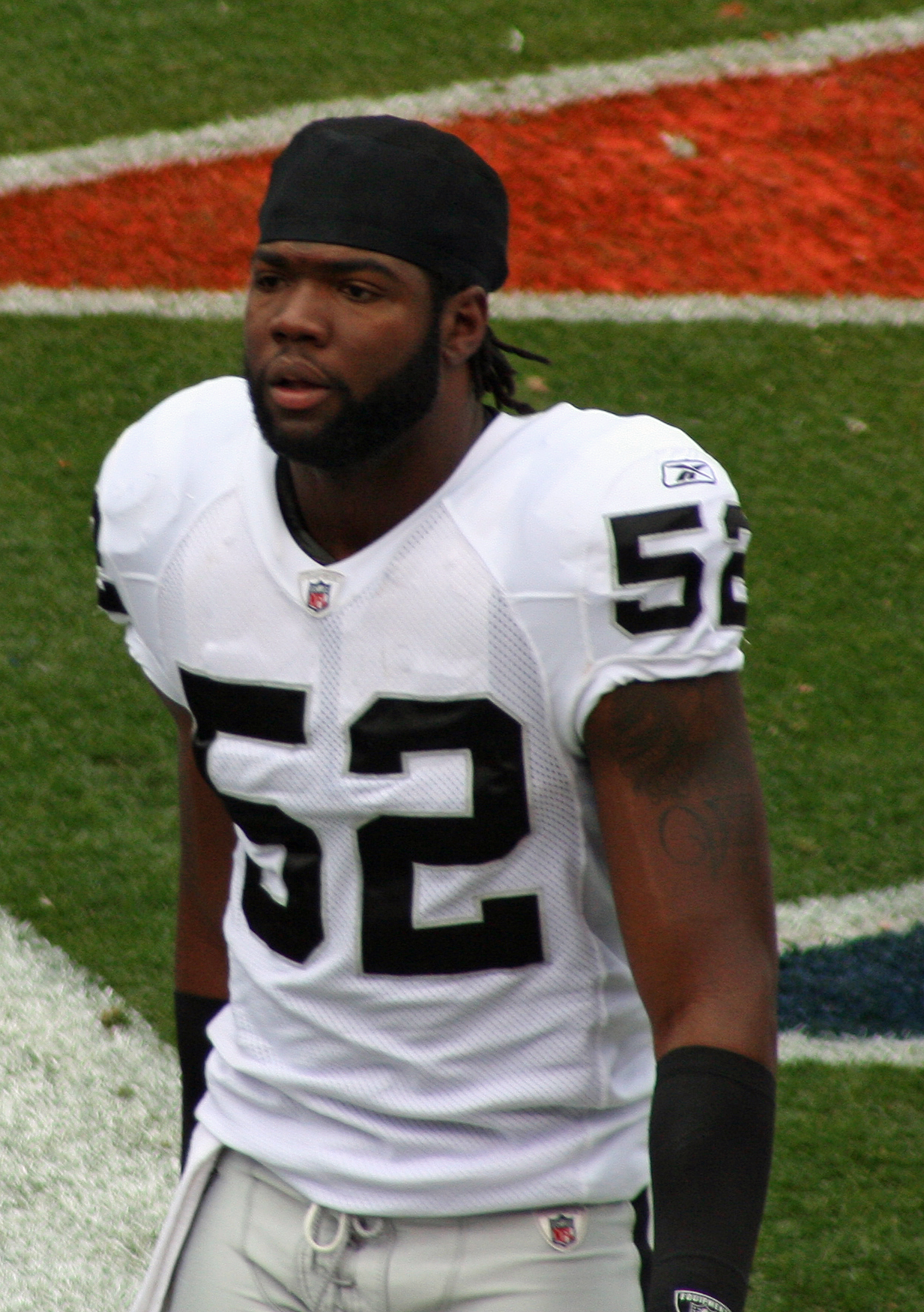
- Groves with the Oakland Raiders in 2010

No. 93, 54, 52, 53
- Position: Linebacker

Personal information
- Born: July 5, 1984; Greenville, Mississippi, U.S.
- Died: October 15, 2016 (aged 32); Trinidad
- Listed height: 6 ft 3 in (1.91 m)
- Listed weight: 265 lb (120 kg)

Career information
- High school: Weston (Greenville)
- College: Auburn
- NFL draft: 2008: 2nd round, 52nd overall pick

Career history
- Jacksonville Jaguars (2008–2009); Oakland Raiders (2010–2011); Arizona Cardinals (2012); Cleveland Browns (2013); Houston Texans (2014)*; Tennessee Titans (2014); Buffalo Bills (2015)*
- * Offseason or practice squad member only

Awards and highlights
- 2× First-team All-SEC (2006, 2007)

Career NFL statistics
- Total tackles: 175
- Sacks: 9.5
- Pass deflections: 6
- Interceptions: 2
- Forced fumbles: 5
- Stats at Pro Football Reference

Quentin Dominic Groves (July 5, 1984 – October 15, 2016) was an American professional football player who was a linebacker in the National Football League (NFL). He was selected by the Jacksonville Jaguars in the second round of the 2008 NFL draft and played college football for the Auburn Tigers. He was also a member of the Oakland Raiders, Arizona Cardinals, Cleveland Browns, Houston Texans, Tennessee Titans and the Buffalo Bills.

Groves was named to the Chuck Bednarik Award, Bronko Nagurski Trophy and Ted Hendricks Award, watchlists for the 2007 college football season. Groves was a sack specialist at Auburn and finished tied for the Auburn career sack record at 26.

== Early life ==
At Greenville Weston High School, Groves started for four years playing tight end as well as defensive end. He recorded 89 tackles, 15 sacks, one interception and seven fumbles forced as a junior and 86 tackles, 22 sacks and three fumble recoveries as a senior. Based on his high school performance, he was selected to the ESPN.com/Tom Lemming Top 100, USA Today All-USA second-team, Orlando Sentinel Super Southern 100 and rated the nation's third best defensive end nationally by ESPN.com/Tom Lemming. He also played basketball, competed in the discus (147 ft, 7 inches), long jump (20 ft, 11 inches) and 100-meter dash (11.44 seconds) in track & field and was a member of the power lifting team (personal best squat of 535 pounds along with a bench press of 295 and a dead lift of 525).

== College career ==
=== 2004 ===
As a redshirt freshman, Groves was used part-time in the rotation at defensive end as a rushing/sack specialist. During the Kentucky game, he recorded six total tackles and four sacks to tie the Auburn single-game individual sack record. He also forced two Kentucky fumbles inside their own 20-yard line, one of which was returned for a touchdown. He had four tackles and a quarterback hurry that caused an interception in Auburn's win over Tennessee in Neyland Stadium. Groves finished the season tied for third in the SEC and tied for the team lead with 7.5 sacks. He also tied for the team lead with 10 tackles for loss for the season. Those efforts earned him recognition on the Sporting News Freshman All-American First-Team, All-SEC Freshman First-Team, Rivals.com Freshman All-America First-Team and the FWAA Freshman All-America Team.

=== 2005 ===
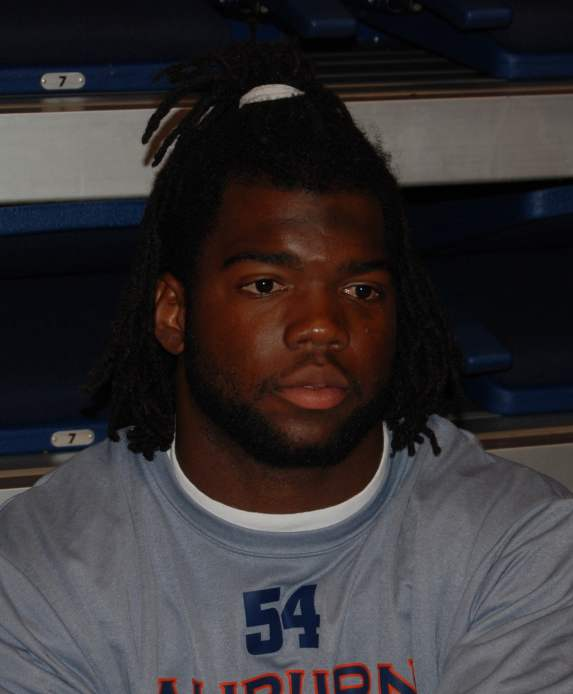
Groves at Auburn's 2007 Fan Day

Groves played in all 12 games in the 2005 season, starting in three. He finished the season with 21 tackles (8 solo 13 assists) eight tackles for loss and six sacks (third on the team).

=== 2006 ===
In 2006, Groves started all 13 games to help Auburn finish 11–2 including a key performance in the Tigers' 27–17 win over eventual BCS champion Florida. Groves sacked Chris Leak three times in the third quarter and forced a fumble in the fourth quarter at Auburn's own six-yard line to stop a Gator scoring opportunity. With under three minutes left, he hurried a Leak pass attempt which was picked off by teammate Eric Brock to seal the win. For his efforts against Florida, Groves was named the FWAA/Bronko Nagurski National Defensive Player of the Week as well as the SEC's Defensive Player of the Week. He was also named SEC Defensive Lineman of the Week for his play in the Auburn victory over cross-state rival Alabama. Groves finished the season with 9.5 sacks to lead the team, as well as 12 tackles for loss, 37 total tackles (24 solo) and three forced fumbles. The performance earned him Coaches and Associated Press All-SEC First Team honors as well as a place on the Rivals.com All-American Third-Team.

=== 2007 ===
In the spring of 2007 Groves was ranked as the #22 player overall in the country for 2007 by Matt Hayes of The Sporting News. In June 2007, he was named to both the Bronko Nagurski Trophy and Chuck Bednarik Award watchlists. In early July, he was also named to the Ted Hendricks Defensive End of the Year watchlist. Just prior to the season, Sports Illustrated ranked him at #9 in their list of the SEC's Top 10 Players.

Groves entered the 2007 season with 23 career sacks, only three behind the Auburn school record held by Gerald Robinson since 1985. In the season opener versus Kansas State, Groves recorded two sacks of quarterback Josh Freeman one of which resulted in a fumble returned for a touchdown by team Antonio Coleman. While Groves continued to be productive tackling, his quest for the Auburn career sack record stalled for several games. In the Tigers' win over the Florida Gators in the Swamp, Groves foot was stepped on and he suffer three severely dislocated toes. The injury sidelined him for the Vanderbilt and Arkansas games, but Groves returned in limited duty against LSU where he recorded a sack of Matt Flynn to tie the career record. Following the regular season, Groves was honored as a Coaches All-SEC First Team selection. Groves finishes as a member of the winningest Senior class in Auburn history, winning 50 games during their time on the Plains.

== Professional career ==
=== Pre-draft ===
Pre-draft measurables
Height	Weight	Arm length	Hand span	40-yard dash	10-yard split	20-yard split	20-yard shuttle	Three-cone drill	Vertical jump	Broad jump	Bench press	Wonderlic
6 ft 3 in (1.91 m)	259 lb (117 kg)	34 3/8 in (0.87 m)	9 1/4 in (0.23 m)	4.57 s	1.57 s	2.68 s	4.42 s	7.31 s	35.0 in (0.89 m)	10 ft 0 in (3.05 m)	30 reps	25
All values from NFL Combine/Auburn's Pro Day

While undergoing medical tests at the NFL Combine, Groves was discovered to have Wolff–Parkinson–White syndrome, which results in him having a rapid heartbeat because of electrical impulses in the heart taking extra pathways. Groves told the media, "It's an extra circuit in the heart, and it speeds up your heartbeat, it's nothing too critical, but you have to take care of it."

Often this condition can be treated with medication, however, not in all cases. Groves elected to have a surgical procedure called ablation, which is described as "minor". After the procedure Groves sent a letter to all NFL teams informing them that he was able to play, according to his doctors. "Some teams had questions so that's when my agent said to get it fixed", Groves said. "The letter said that the doctors said I was 100% healed, and I'm good."

=== Jacksonville Jaguars ===
Groves was selected in 21st spot of the second round (52nd overall) of the 2008 NFL draft by the Jacksonville Jaguars. The Jaguars traded with Tampa Bay to move up six spots in order to select Groves.

=== Oakland Raiders ===
Groves was traded to the Oakland Raiders from the Jacksonville Jaguars for a 5th-round pick in the 2010 NFL draft.

=== Arizona Cardinals ===
Groves signed as an unrestricted free agent with the Arizona Cardinals on May 28, 2012. On November 9, Groves was fined $15,750 for a horse-collar tackle against the Green Bay Packers in Week 9.

=== Cleveland Browns ===
Groves signed as an unrestricted free agent with the Cleveland Browns on March 13, 2013. He was released on June 6, 2014.

=== Houston Texans ===
Groves signed as an unrestricted free agent with the Houston Texans on July 27, 2014. The Texans released him for final roster cuts on August 30.

=== Tennessee Titans ===
On September 1, 2014, Groves signed with the Tennessee Titans.

=== Buffalo Bills ===
On August 17, 2015, Groves signed with the Buffalo Bills. On September 4, 2015, he was released by the Bills.

== NFL career statistics ==
Legend
**Bold**	Career high

Year	Team	Games		Tackles					Interceptions					Fumbles			
Year	Team	GP	GS	Cmb	Solo	Ast	Sck	TFL	Int	Yds	TD	Lng	PD	FF	FR	Yds	TD
2008	JAX	**16**	0	13	11	2	2.5	**8**	0	0	0	0	1	**1**	0	0	0
2009	JAX	**16**	7	30	24	6	0.0	4	**1**	**37**	0	**37**	1	**1**	0	0	0
2010	OAK	15	**12**	40	29	**11**	0.0	4	**1**	−4	0	−4	**2**	0	**2**	0	0
2011	OAK	**16**	3	24	20	4	0.0	2	0	0	0	0	**2**	**1**	0	0	0
2012	ARI	**16**	7	**46**	**37**	9	**4.0**	3	0	0	0	0	0	**1**	0	0	0
2013	CLE	5	0	4	4	0	2.0	3	0	0	0	0	0	**1**	0	0	0
2014	TEN	**16**	3	18	16	2	1.0	2	0	0	0	0	0	0	0	0	0
		100	32	175	141	34	9.5	26	2	33	0	37	6	5	2	0	0

== Personal life ==
Groves was born in Greenville, Mississippi. He had two brothers, Antonial and Bennett.

On July 31, 2006, he eloped to marry Treska Baptiste, a member of Auburn's track team who hails from Trinidad, just before the start of his junior year. The couple had two children, a son Que’Mani Kassan Shiloh and a daughter Que’Jaah.

Groves died on October 15, 2016, of a heart attack. He was 32 years old.
