= Tim Duckworth (American football) =

American football player (born 1982)

No. 75
- Position: Guard

Personal information
- Born: September 14, 1982 (age 44); Taylorsville, Mississippi, U.S.
- Listed height: 6 ft 4 in (1.93 m)
- Listed weight: 318 lb (144 kg)

Career information
- High school: Taylorsville
- College: Auburn
- NFL draft: 2007: undrafted

Career history
- Denver Broncos (2007)*; New Orleans Saints (2007–2008)*; Philadelphia Eagles (2008)*; New Orleans Saints (2009–2010)*; Carolina Panthers (2010); Las Vegas Locomotives (2011–2012)
- * Offseason or practice squad member only

Awards and highlights
- Super Bowl champion (XLIV); First-team All-SEC (2006); 2× Second-team All-SEC (2004, 2005)

Career NFL statistics
- Games played: 5
- Stats at Pro Football Reference

Tim Duckworth (born September 14, 1982) is an American former professional football player who was a guard in the National Football League (NFL). He played college football for the Auburn Tigers and was signed by the Denver Broncos as an undrafted free agent in 2007. Duckworth was also a member of the New Orleans Saints, Philadelphia Eagles and Carolina Panthers.

Duckworth was a member of the Saints practice squad during their 2007 and 2008 seasons, and then after a 2008 post-season stint on the Eagles practice squad, he rejoined the Saints practice squad for their Super Bowl-winning 2009 season. Duckworth was released by the Saints on August 24, 2010. He signed with Carolina on August 30, 2010. On October 10, 2010, Duckworth was released by the Panthers.
