= Greg Adkins =

American football player and coach (born 1968)

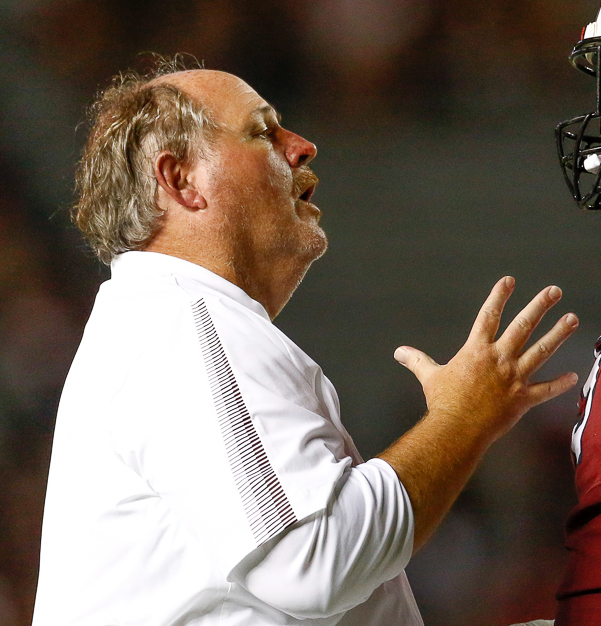
- Adkins with South Carolina in 2021

Current position
- Title: Analyst
- Team: South Carolina

Biographical details
- Born: March 25, 1968 (age 58); Charleston, West Virginia, U.S.

Playing career
- 1986–1989: Marshall
- Position: Offensive lineman

Coaching career (HC unless noted)
- 1991–1995: Marshall (DL/TE/OL)
- 1996: Georgia (DL)
- 1997–2000: Georgia (OL/TE)
- 2001–2002: Troy (OL/RC)
- 2003–2005: Tennessee (TE / asst OL / RC)
- 2006–2008: Tennessee (OL)
- 2009–2012: Syracuse (OL/RC)
- 2013–2014: Buffalo Bills (TE)
- 2015–2016: Oklahoma State (OL)
- 2017: Charlotte (OL/RGC)
- 2018–2020: Marshall (AHC/OL/RC)
- 2021–2022: South Carolina (OL)
- 2023–present: South Carolina (Analyst)

Greg Adkins (born March 25, 1968) is an American football coach and former player. He is currently the offensive line coach at the University of South Carolina. Adkins has coached at both the college level and the NFL. He has 29 years of experience working as an offensive line and tight ends coach, as well as serving as a recruiting coordinator at several schools. He has coached in multiple national championship games and conference championship games, as well as 15 bowl games.

== Coaching career ==
=== Tennessee ===
In 2003, Adkins was named the tight ends coach of Tennessee as well as assistant offensive line coach. The Volunteers went 10–3 in 2003, were co-champions of the SEC East, but fell in the 2004 Peach Bowl 14–27 against Clemson. While assisting the offensive line, center Scott Wells and tackle Michael Muñoz made All-SEC in 2003.

In 2004, Tennessee went 10–3, and despite losing the 2004 SEC Championship Game against Auburn 28–38, would go on to defeat Texas A&M in the 2005 Cotton Bowl Classic 38–7. For the second year in a row Michael Muñoz made All-SEC in 2004.

In 2005, The Vols went 5–6, tied for 3rd in the SEC East. Tackle Arron Sears made All-SEC in 2005. At the end of the 2005 season, Adkins was named the offensive line coach for the Vols.

In 2006, Tennessee went 9–4. 2nd in the SEC East, and fell to Penn State in the 2007 Outback Bowl 10–20. Tackle Arron Sears made All-SEC again in 2006.

In 2007, Tennessee went 10–4, and after losing the 2007 SEC Championship Game to LSU 14–21, defeated Wisconsin in the 2008 Outback Bowl 21–17. Guard Anthony Parker and tackle Eric Young made All-SEC in 2007.

In 2008, Tennessee went 5–7, 4th in the SEC East. Anthony Parker made All-SEC again in 2008. At the end of the 2008 season, head coach Fulmer retired, which left Adkins without a job.

=== Syracuse ===
In 2009, Adkins was named the offensive line coach of Syracuse. Syracuse went 4–8 in 2009. Under his coaching, Ryan Bartholomew was named 2nd-team All-Big East.

The next season, Syracuse ended 2010 with a 8–5 record, defeating Kansas State in the 2010 Pinstripe Bowl 36–34. Justin Pugh was named 2nd-team All-Big East.

In 2011, Syracuse went 5–7, tied for last in the Big East. Tackle Justin Pugh and guard Andrew Tiller made All-Big East honors.

In 2012, Syracuse went 8–5, and defeated West Virginia in the 2012 Pinstripe Bowl 38–14. Justin Pugh made 1st-team All-Big East with Zack Chibane making the 2nd-team. After the 2012 season, Adkins left Syracuse to follow his head coach Marrone on to the Buffalo Bills.

=== Buffalo Bills ===
On January 15, 2013, Adkins was named the tight ends coach for the Buffalo Bills. The Bills finished the 2013 season 6–10, good for last in the AFC East. Tight end Scott Chandler led the Bills in receptions and receiving yards in 2013.

The following season, the Bills ended 2014 season 9–7, second in the AFC East but missed the playoffs.

After the 2014 season, Adkins lost his job when head coach Marrone left the Bills.

=== Oklahoma State ===
On March 15, 2015, Adkins was named the offensive line coach at Oklahoma State. The Cowboys finished 2015 with a 10–3 record and made the 2016 Sugar Bowl, falling to Ole Miss 20–48.

The next year, the Cowboys ended 2016 10-3 again, defeating Colorado 38–8 in the 2016 Alamo Bowl. Under his coaching, junior Zach Crabtree and senior Victor Salako were named 2nd-team All-Big 12, with Marcus Keyes being named an Honorable mention. On February 3, 2017, Adkins was dismissed following poor recruiting for the offensive line.

=== Charlotte ===
On February 21, 2017, Adkins was named the offensive line coach at Charlotte. On September 25, he was promoted to offensive coordinator after a 0–4 start. The 49ers ended the 2017 season 1–11. Under his coaching, junior Nate Davis and senior Eugene German were named All-Conference USA Honorable mentions.

=== Marshall (second stint) ===
On February 23, 2018, Adkins was named the offensive line coach at Marshall. Marshall ended the 2018 season 8-4 and made the 2018 Gasparilla Bowl, defeating the South Florida Bulls 38–20. Under his coaching, offensive lineman Levi Brown was named 1st-team All-Conference USA.

=== South Carolina ===
On January 22, 2021, Adkins was named the Offensive line coach at South Carolina, joining Shane Beamer's inaugural staff.

== Accolades ==
- 2003 SEC East Division Co-Champion
- 2005 Cotton Bowl Classic winner
- 2007 SEC East Division Co-Champion
- 2008 Outback Bowl winner
- 2010 Pinstripe Bowl winner
- 2012 Pinstripe Bowl winner
- 2016 Alamo Bowl winner
- 2018 Gasparilla Bowl winner
- 2020 Conference USA East Division Champion
