= Arian Foster =

American football player (born 1986)

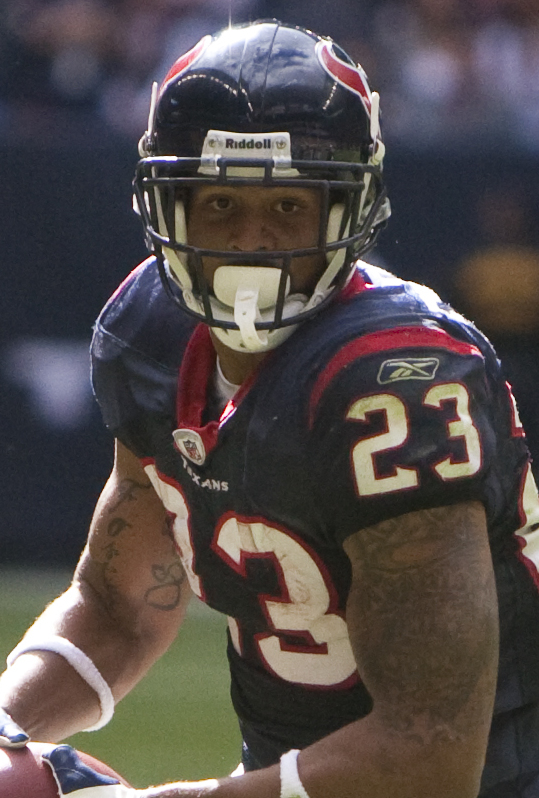
- Foster with the Houston Texans in 2010

No. 37, 23, 29
- Position: Running back

Personal information
- Born: August 24, 1986 (age 40); Albuquerque, New Mexico, U.S.
- Listed height: 6 ft 1 in (1.85 m)
- Listed weight: 227 lb (103 kg)

Career information
- High school: Valley (Albuquerque); Mission Bay (San Diego, California)
- College: Tennessee (2004–2008)
- NFL draft: 2009: undrafted

Career history
- Houston Texans (2009–2015); Miami Dolphins (2016)

Awards and highlights
- First-team All-Pro (2010); Second-team All-Pro (2011); 4× Pro Bowl (2010–2012, 2014); 2× NFL rushing touchdowns leader (2010, 2012); NFL rushing yards leader (2010); Second-team All-SEC (2007)

Career NFL statistics
- Rushing attempts: 1,476
- Rushing yards: 6,527
- Rushing touchdowns: 54
- Receptions: 255
- Receiving yards: 2,346
- Receiving touchdowns: 14
- Stats at Pro Football Reference

Arian Isa Foster (born August 24, 1986) is an American former football player who is a musical artist under the name Bobby Feeno. He played professionally as a running back in the National Football League (NFL) for seven and a half seasons.

Foster played college football for the Tennessee Volunteers, and was signed by the NFL's Houston Texans as an undrafted free agent in 2009. He holds the Texans franchise records for rushing yards and rushing touchdowns, and also played for the Miami Dolphins. In the 2010 NFL season, Foster led the league in rushing yards with 1,616, earning his first Pro Bowl selection. Foster announced his retirement from the NFL in 2016.

== Early life ==
Foster was born August 24, 1986, in Albuquerque, New Mexico, to Carl Foster, a former wide receiver for the University of New Mexico, and Bernadette Sizemore, a secretary for the university. Foster's father signed with the Denver Broncos in 1982, though was released from the team before the start of the season. Foster has four siblings, Abdul, who was also an athlete, running track in high school and in college at Florida A&M, and his sister Christina, his brother Braxton and sister Maria.

Foster's mother encouraged him to play football at the age of 7, to the dismay of Foster's father, an ex-wide receiver himself. As a former player at a high level, Carl was not supportive of the idea of his son entering the sport at such a young age. Foster took to the game, telling his elementary school teacher that he intended to become "a star in the NFL." Foster attended Taft Middle School in Albuquerque.

His parents divorced in 2000 while he was attending Valley High School in Albuquerque, and in 2002, he moved to San Diego with his father. Foster competed in football at Mission Bay Senior High School, where he initially played as a linebacker, but became a full-time running back in his junior and senior years. He was Mission Bay's featured running back those years, and led San Diego County in all-purpose yards with 2,500 while compiling 2,093 rushing yards and 24 touchdowns in addition to six scores on kickoff returns his senior year. In a game against Clairemont High School, Foster ran for 321 yards and for his efforts, he was named San Diego Union Tribune All-San Diego Western League Player of the Year, received All-West Region appointment by PrepStar, and also earned All-California Interscholastic Federation honors. He earned a three-star rating from Rivals.com. Then-Tennessee offensive coordinator Randy Sanders and running backs coach Trooper Taylor were impressed by Foster when recruiting in San Diego. Foster committed to attend Tennessee on January 28, 2004.

Foster also competed on the track & field team as a sprinter and high jumper. He had personal-bests of 11.24 seconds in the dash, and had a top-jump of 6'2.5" in the high jump. He was also a member of the 4 × 100 m relay squad.

== College career ==
Foster red-shirted his first season at the University of Tennessee, sitting behind Gerald Riggs Jr. and Cedric Houston on the depth chart. He was a three-year starter at running back for the Volunteers.

=== 2005 season ===
In his 2005 redshirt freshman season, Foster was an immediate contributor. He took on a heavier responsibility in the running game later in the season. Foster made his collegiate debut on September 3 against Alabama-Birmingham. On October 1, in a home game against the Ole Miss Rebels, he had his first collegiate touchdown on a one-yard run late in the fourth quarter of the 27–10 victory. On October 22, in a game against #5 Alabama, Riggs suffered a season-ending injury, putting more rushing opportunities onto Foster. On October 29, in a home game against the South Carolina Gamecocks, he had 25 carries for 148 rushing yards and a rushing touchdown in the narrow 16–15 loss. On November 5, in a road game against the #8 Notre Dame Fighting Irish, he had 28 carries for 125 rushing yards and a rushing touchdown in the 41–21 loss. In the following game against the Memphis Tigers, he had 28 carries for 132 rushing yards in the 20–16 victory at home. In the next game, he had a commanding individual performance in a 28–24 loss against the Vanderbilt Commodores. Despite the Commodores snapping a 22-game losing streak to Tennessee, he had 40 carries, scored two touchdowns, and his total of 268 all-purpose yards was the third-highest total in school history. In the regular season finale in a road game against the Kentucky Wildcats, he had 114 rushing yards and 44 receiving yards in the 27–8 victory. Overall, in the 2005 season, he finished as the team's leading rusher with 879 rushing yards, five rushing touchdowns, 14 receptions, and 148 receiving yards.

=== 2006 season ===
Foster's sophomore season saw a downturn in production with the emergence of Lamarcus Coker and Montario Hardesty in the backfield. He started the 2006 season with 17 carries for 69 rushing yards and a four-yard receiving touchdown in the 35–18 home victory over the #9 California Golden Bears. In the next two games combined, Foster only carried nine times for 24 rushing yards in a 31–30 victory over Air Force and a 21–20 loss to #7 Florida. Foster suffered through an ankle injury and it ended up costing him two games. He returned on October 7, in a road game against the #10 Georgia Bulldogs, he had 15 carries for 63 rushing yards and three rushing touchdowns in the 51–33 victory. On October 21, against rival Alabama, he had the go-ahead one-yard rushing touchdown late in the fourth quarter of the 16–13 victory. Foster ended the season with 91 carries for 322 rushing yards and five rushing touchdowns. Tennessee's final game of the season was the 2007 Outback Bowl against the Penn State Nittany Lions, in which Foster fumbled with ten minutes remaining deep in Penn State territory. The ball was picked up by cornerback Tony Davis and returned 88 yards for a touchdown, breaking a 10–10 tie; Penn State won 20–10.

=== 2007 season ===
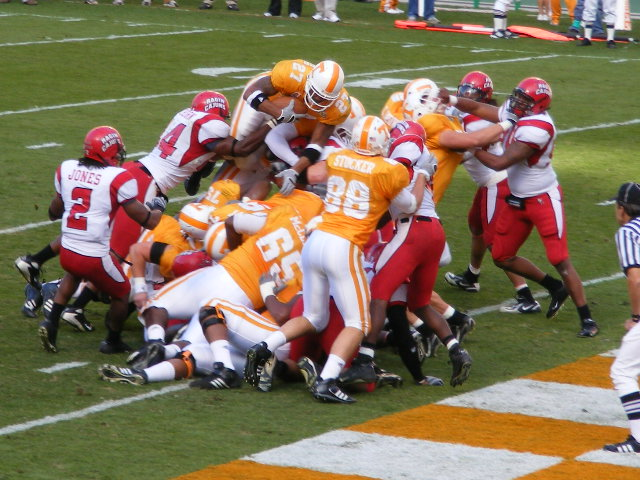
Arian Foster dives over the pile to score against Louisiana–Lafayette at Neyland Stadium

His junior season saw Foster take over as the main running back. In the regular season opener against #12 California, he had 13 carries for 89 rushing yards to go along with three receptions for 20 receiving yards and a receiving touchdown in the 45–31 loss. In the second game, against the Southern Miss Golden Eagles, he had 125 rushing yards and two rushing touchdowns in the 39–19 victory at home. Against the #3 Florida Gators at the Swamp, Foster fumbled a left-handed hand-off from injured quarterback Erik Ainge which was returned eighteen yards for a touchdown; Florida won 35–20. On October 6, at home against the #12 Georgia Bulldogs, he had 98 rushing yards and three rushing touchdowns in the 35–14 victory. In the following game, against the Mississippi State Bulldogs, he had 139 rushing yards and a rushing touchdown in the 33–21 victory. In the game against the Alabama Crimson Tide at Bryant-Denny Stadium, he had 91 rushing yards and a rushing touchdown to go along with four receptions for 74 receiving yards in the 41–17 loss. On October 27, at home against the #15 South Carolina Gamecocks, he had 19 carries for 75 rushing yards and a rushing touchdown in the 27–24 victory. On November 3, at home against the Louisiana–Lafayette Ragin' Cajuns, he had 20 carries for 100 rushing yards and two rushing touchdowns in the 59–7 victory. In the next game, against the Arkansas Razorbacks, he had 83 rushing yards and a rushing touchdown, his seventh consecutive game with a rushing touchdown, in the 34–13 victory. Foster surpassed the 1,000-yard mark with a 118-yard performance on 27 carries in a 52–50 win on the road against the Kentucky Wildcats. In addition, he tallied nine receptions for 98 receiving yards and a receiving touchdown in the game. He finished his junior season with 245 carries for 1,193 yards and 12 touchdowns, while also catching 39 passes for 340 yards and an additional two scores. He finished third in the SEC in rushing yards.

=== 2008 season ===
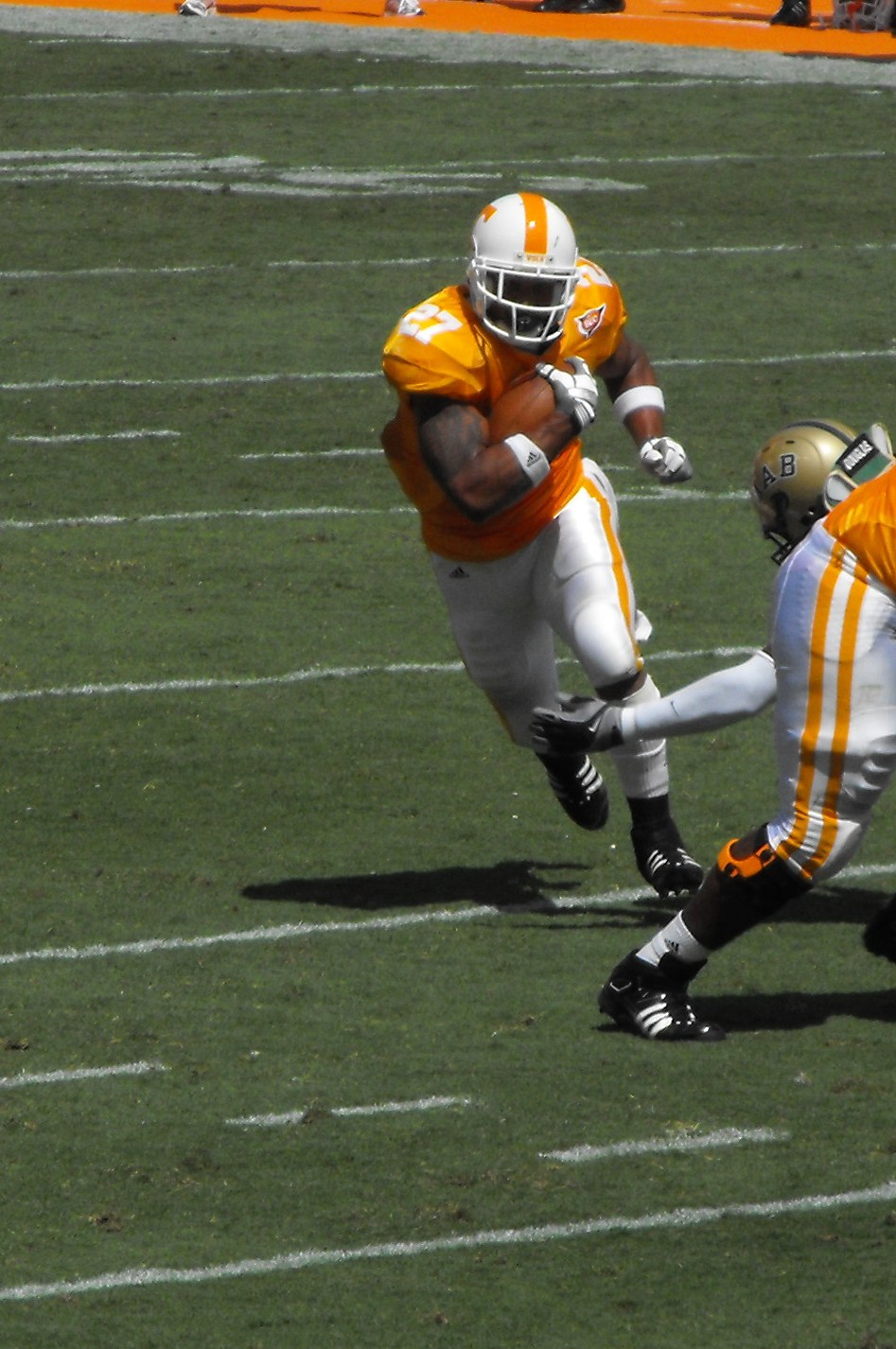
Foster carrying the ball while evading an attempted tackle against the Alabama–Birmingham Blazers

Foster's breakout junior season resulted in a second-round grade from the draft advisory board and led him to consider leaving school. However, head coach Phillip Fulmer persuaded him to stay for his senior season, a decision Foster would later deeply regret. Playing under the third position coach and offensive coordinator of his tenure, Foster was utilized in a rotation following the installation of a new offensive scheme that the Tennessee coaches thought was a better fit for some of the other running backs on the roster. He only had one game with 100 rushing yards, the second game of the season, a 35–3 victory over the UAB Blazers. For his part, Fulmer would attribute Foster's diminished workload to knee and thigh injuries which would later be disputed. In the end, Foster compiled 570 yards on 131 carries with just one touchdown in his senior season.

Foster finished his collegiate career as the school's second all-time leading rusher with 2,964 yards, only trailing Travis Henry. His legacy, however, was mixed. He fumbled just five times on a school-record 650 carries, but all of them came at critical moments. His former coach Fulmer has defended Foster regarding these crucial mistakes, saying "There were a couple of fumbles that were untimely that people want to remember; they forget about his full career, about how special he was. He had a couple of fumbles after a couple of big runs. They were costly, but we probably wouldn't have been there without him." Among all players in Tennessee history to reach 1,000 rushing yards, Foster finished second in receiving yards in school history with 742, only trailing Stanley Morgan.

== Professional career ==
=== Pre-draft ===
Foster's subpar senior campaign caused his draft stock to plummet, as well as scouts' concerns about his below-average pass-blocking, issues with ball security, and the less-than-stellar reviews from Tennessee staff members that portrayed him as selfish and hard to coach. Foster ranked 24th among running backs available in the 2009 NFL draft, according to Sports Illustrated. A pulled hamstring prevented Foster from working out at the NFL Scouting Combine, and he had a poor showing at Tennessee's Pro Day when he registered a 4.65 40-yard dash, 4.50 short shuttle, 32" vertical leap and 9′7″ broad jump. The combination of factors led to Foster being undrafted at the 2009 NFL draft; after several teams showed interest in him as a rookie free agent, he chose to sign a contract with the Houston Texans in May 2009 because he thought the situation suited him.

Pre-draft measurables
Height	Weight	Arm length	Hand span	40-yard dash	10-yard split	20-yard split	20-yard shuttle	Three-cone drill	Vertical jump	Broad jump	Bench press	Wonderlic
6 ft 0 3/4 in (1.85 m)	226 lb (103 kg)	33 3/8 in (0.85 m)	9 7/8 in (0.25 m)	4.69 s	1.62 s	2.71 s	4.53 s	7.09 s	32.0 in (0.81 m)	9 ft 7 in (2.92 m)	23 reps	25
All values from NFL Combine/San Diego State Pro Day

=== Houston Texans ===
==== 2009 season ====
Foster was signed by the Houston Texans as an undrafted free agent on May 1, 2009. He was released by the team on September 5, 2009, but was later signed to the Texans' practice squad on September 6 and signed to the active roster on November 17. Foster made his NFL debut against the Tennessee Titans on November 23, 2009, but recorded no offensive statistics in the 20–17 loss. In Week 16, he scored his first NFL career touchdown against the Miami Dolphins in Miami on December 27, 2009, on a 17-yard run up the middle in the second quarter of the 27–20 victory. Foster made his first career start against the New England Patriots in the regular season finale on January 3, 2010, and ran for 119 yards and scored twice on 20 carries in the 34–27 victory.

Overall, Foster played six games, starting one, during the 2009 season, finishing with 54 carries for 257 rushing yards and three rushing touchdowns to go along with eight receptions for 93 receiving yards.

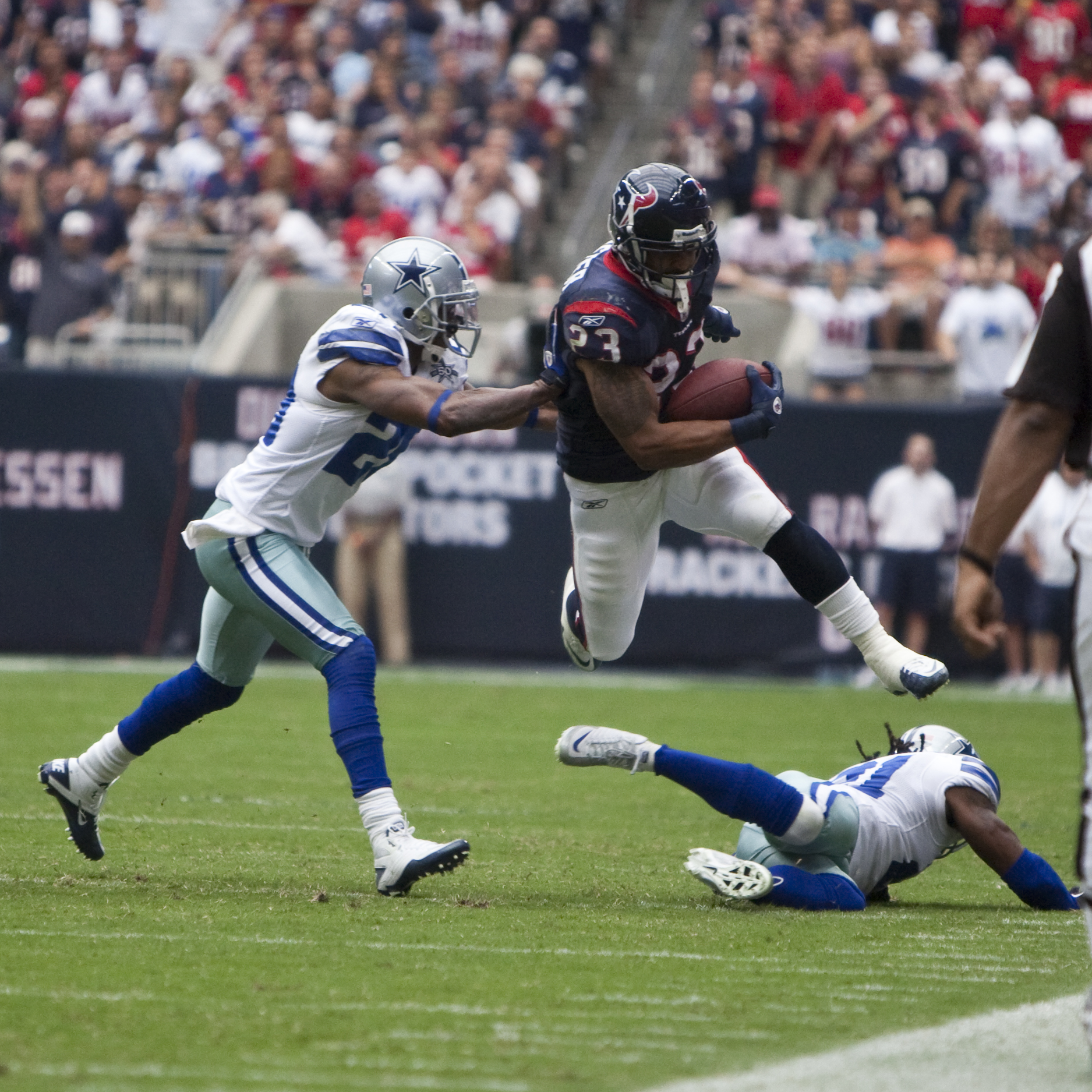
A Dallas Cowboys defender pushes Foster down in a 2010 game.

==== 2010 season ====
Before the 2010 season, Foster changed his number from #37 to #23. In the 2010 season opener on September 12, Houston played against the Indianapolis Colts. Foster replaced Steve Slaton, the starting running back in the 2009 season, and broke many franchise records, rushing 33 times for 231 yards and three touchdowns in the 34–24 victory. In addition to breaking the franchise record for the most rushing yards in a single game, he and Slaton combined for 260 rushing yards, well over the team record for most total in a game, and also the most rushing yards given up to a single player by the Indianapolis Colts. Foster posted the second-highest NFL opening day rushing total, trailing only O. J. Simpson's 250 yards against the New England Patriots in 1973. In Week 3 against the Dallas Cowboys, he had 17 carries for 106 rushing yards in the 27–13 loss. In Week 4, against the Oakland Raiders after being benched for the first quarter, Foster recorded the longest run in Texans franchise history when he scored on a 74-yard touchdown run in the third quarter to break a 14–14 tie. Houston went on to win 31–24 behind Foster's 187 yards from scrimmage. In Week 6, against the Kansas City Chiefs, he had 18 carries for 71 rushing yards and two rushing touchdowns in the 35–31 victory. In Week 8, against the Indianapolis Colts, he had 15 carries for 102 rushing yards and one rushing touchdown in the 30–17 loss. He followed that up with 27 carries for 127 rushing yards and two rushing touchdowns in the 29–23 loss to the San Diego Chargers. In Week 11 against the New York Jets, he had 84 rushing yards and two rushing touchdowns in the 30–27 loss. In the next game, against the Tennessee Titans, he had 30 carries for 143 rushing yards in the 20–0 victory. In Week 13 against the Philadelphia Eagles, he had 83 rushing yards and a rushing touchdown to go along with a receiving touchdown in the 34–24 loss. In Week 14 against the Baltimore Ravens, he had 20 carries for 100 rushing yards in the 34–28 loss.

After being passed in rushing yards by Jamaal Charles during the Chiefs' last game of the regular season, Foster posted another stunning performance rushing for 180 rushing yards and two rushing touchdowns in Week 17 against the Jacksonville Jaguars to solidify his spot as the 2010 rushing leader. Foster finished the 2010 season by winning the rushing title with 1,616 rushing yards and 604 receiving yards breaking the record set by Priest Holmes for most yards from scrimmage ever by an undrafted player. He was invited to the 2011 Pro Bowl, which was his first career invite. He was ranked 25th by his fellow players on the NFL Top 100 Players of 2011.

==== 2011 season ====
Foster strained his hamstring twice during the 2011 preseason – at one point creating controversy due to his tweeting of an MRI image of the damaged tendon – resulting in his missing the Texans' season opener against the Indianapolis Colts.

Foster returned in Week 2 against the Miami Dolphins, but had to leave the game due to a re-aggravation of his hamstring. Foster missed Houston's Week 3 game on the road against the New Orleans Saints, but returned to face the Pittsburgh Steelers the following Sunday. Against Pittsburgh, Foster ran the ball 30 times for 155 yards, including a 42-yard fourth-quarter touchdown run that proved to be the winning points in the Texans' 17–10 victory. In what was his tenth career 100-yard game, Foster's total of 155 yards was the second-most by a running back against the Steelers defense since 2001, and the most since Curtis Martin tallied 174 yards against the Steelers on December 14, 2003. Additionally, his 42-yard touchdown was the longest scoring run allowed by the Steelers since 2006. The Texans squared off with the Oakland Raiders at home in Week 5. Foster had a tough time generating yards on the ground, tallying just 68 yards on 22 carries. It was as a pass-catcher that Foster shone against Oakland, catching just five passes for 116 yards, including a career-long 60-yard reception in the third quarter. A last-minute rally by Houston fell short when quarterback Matt Schaub was intercepted in the end zone as Houston fell, 25–20. In Week 6, the Baltimore Ravens' stout defense proved a challenge for Foster as he was limited to just 49 yards on 15 carries in a decisive 29–14 loss. Foster continued to contribute in the passing game catching six passes for 52 yards in the losing effort. Foster exploded in Week 7 against the Tennessee Titans, rushing for 115 yards and two touchdowns on 25 carries while accumulating 119 yards receiving and another touchdown on five catches. This helped the Texans en route to a 41–7 victory over their division foe and established them as the division leader. Foster followed up his career-day against the Titans with a solid performance against the Jacksonville Jaguars. In a tough, ball-control type of game, Foster equaled his career-high in rushing attempts with 33, totaling 112 yards on the ground. In contrast to Foster's prolific pass-catching in recent weeks, the Jaguars limited Foster to just one catch for 12 yards out of the backfield in Houston's 24–14 victory. On December 22, he had 158 rushing yards and a rushing touchdown in the 19–16 loss to the Indianapolis Colts in Week 16. Overall, he finished the 2011 season with 278 carries for 1,224 rushing yards and ten rushing touchdowns to go along with 53 receptions for 617 receiving yards and two receiving touchdowns.

Foster was invited to the 2012 Pro Bowl. The Texans finished the season with a 10–6 record and won the AFC South. In the Wild Card Round against the Cincinnati Bengals, he had 153 rushing yards, two rushing touchdowns, three receptions, and 29 receiving yards in the 31–10 victory in his playoff debut. In the Divisional Round against the Baltimore Ravens, he had 132 rushing yards, one rushing touchdown, five receptions, and 22 receiving yards in the 20–13 loss. He was ranked 25th by his fellow players on the NFL Top 100 Players of 2012.

==== 2012 season ====
On March 5, the Texans reportedly reached a deal with Foster, deciding he was worth up to $43.5 million over five years. The contract included $20.75 million guaranteed, $30 million in his first three years, and $18 million in 2012.

Foster started the 2012 season with 26 carries for 79 rushing yards and two rushing touchdowns in the 30–10 victory over the Miami Dolphins. In Week 2, Foster had 28 carries for 110 rushing yards and a touchdown in the 27–7 victory over the Jacksonville Jaguars. On October 8, in a Monday Night Football game against the New York Jets, Foster reached 5,000 yards from scrimmage in his 40th career game, becoming the third-fastest player to reach the milestone, only behind Edgerrin James (36 games) and Eric Dickerson (39 games). In his next two games, he recorded two rushing touchdowns in a 42–24 loss to the Green Bay Packers and the 43–13 victory over the Baltimore Ravens. On November 22, against the Detroit Lions, he had 102 rushing yards and two rushing touchdowns in the 34–31 victory in Week 12. On December 16, against the Indianapolis Colts, he had 27 carries for 165 rushing yards in the 29–17 victory in Week 15. On December 23 against the Minnesota Vikings, Foster left the game in the third quarter with an irregular heartbeat. Foster was announced the starting running back in the AFC Division for the 2013 Pro Bowl. He ended the season with league-high 351 carries for 1,424 rushing yards and 15 rushing touchdowns.

The Texans finished the season with a 12–4 record and won the AFC South for the second consecutive year. In the Wild Card Round against the Cincinnati Bengals, he had 140 rushing yards, one rushing touchdown, eight receptions, and 34 receiving yards in the 19–13 victory. In the Divisional Round against the New England Patriots, he had 90 rushing yards, one rushing touchdown, seven receptions, 63 receiving yards, and one receiving touchdown in the 41–28 loss. He was ranked 8th by his fellow players on the NFL Top 100 Players of 2013.

==== 2013 season ====
Foster sustained a back injury in August before the 2013 regular season began, which limited his preseason play, although he was able to play in the first eight weeks of the regular season. Foster was not physically able to complete the season, but during the time that which he played, Foster had 121 carries, advancing the ball for a total of 542 yards, and had a touchdown in their second game of the regular season in which they defeated the Tennessee Titans by a score of 30–24. He left the game in Week 7 against the Kansas City Chiefs due to a calf injury. In Week 9, he had to leave the game they lost 27–24 to the Indianapolis Colts with a season ending back injury. The injury required surgery for a ruptured disk in Foster's lumbar spine.

Foster had surgery on a bulging disk in his back on November 13, 2013, in Los Angeles. Foster tried to play through the injury in the second divisional game against the Indianapolis Colts, the day he injured his back, and then tried to avoid surgery, but, after speaking with multiple doctors and specialists, Dr. Watkins included, he decided to undergo surgery. Foster made it his goal after this devastating injury and surgery to enter the 2014 season as a healthy contributor to the Texans.

==== 2014 season ====
In the 2014 season opener, a 17–6 win over the Washington Redskins, Foster had 103 rushing yards on 27 carries. In the following game against the Oakland Raiders, he had 28 carries for 138 rushing yards and a rushing touchdown in the 30–14 victory. On October 5, against the Dallas Cowboys, he had 23 carries for 157 rushing yards and two rushing touchdowns in the 20–17 loss in Week 5. In the next game, against the Indianapolis Colts, he had 20 carries for 109 rushing yards and two rushing touchdowns in the 33–28 loss. He had 20 carries for 102 rushing yards in the following game, a 30–23 loss against the Pittsburgh Steelers. He recorded his fourth consecutive 100-yard game with 151 rushing yards and two rushing touchdowns against the Tennessee Titans. In addition, he had a receiving touchdown in the 30–16 victory. On December 7, against the Jacksonville Jaguars, he had 24 carries for 127 rushing yards and a rushing touchdown in the 27–13 victory in Week 14. Foster had a great comeback season after returning from his back injury, rushing for 1,246 yards and eight touchdowns while having 38 receptions for 327 receiving yards and five receiving touchdowns. For the fourth season in his career, Foster rushed for at least 1,000 yards. With that accomplishment, Foster was voted to the 2015 Pro Bowl, his fourth such nomination in his NFL career. He was named the FedEx Ground NFL Player of the Week for his Week 8 performance (151 rushing yards and two touchdowns) against the Tennessee Titans. He was ranked 80th by his fellow players on the NFL Top 100 Players of 2015.

==== 2015 season ====
Foster started the 2015 season injured and did not play until Week 4 against the Atlanta Falcons. Foster ruptured his Achilles tendon on October 25, 2015, in a Week 7 loss to the Miami Dolphins. Two days later, Foster was placed on injured reserve, effectively ending his season. Foster played in four games and finished the 2015 season with 63 carries for 163 rushing yards and one rushing touchdown to go along with 22 receptions for 227 receiving yards and two receiving touchdowns.

Foster was released by the Texans on March 3, 2016. He finished his Texans career with 6,472 yards and 54 rushing touchdowns, both franchise records.

=== Miami Dolphins ===
On July 18, 2016, Foster signed a one-year contract with the Miami Dolphins. Foster wore #34 during the preseason, but would later change it to #29 before the regular season started. He rushed for 55 yards in four games before suffering another lower body injury.

=== Retirement ===
On October 24, 2016, one day after rushing for five yards on three carries in Week 7 against the Buffalo Bills, Foster announced his retirement from the NFL.

During a 2017 appearance on The Joe Rogan Experience, Foster expressed regret in playing football saying, “If I had to do it over again, I wouldn’t have played football, I’d be a scientist. Not even close.” Foster cited the physical damage, the ‘awkward reality of living in a fishbowl as a young man’ and feeling it’s worth not the fame and fortune.

== Career statistics ==
=== NFL ===
Legend
	Led the league
**Bold**	Career high

Year	Team	Games		Rushing						Receiving					Fumbles	
Year	Team	GP	GS	Att	Yds	Avg	Y/G	Lng	TD	Rec	Yds	Avg	Lng	TD	Fum	Lost
2009	HOU	6	1	54	257	4.8	42.8	24	3	8	93	11.6	20	0	1	1
2010	HOU	**16**	13	327	**1,616**	**4.9**	**101.0**	**74**	**16**	**66**	604	9.2	50	2	3	2
2011	HOU	13	13	278	1,224	4.4	94.2	43	10	53	**617**	**11.6**	**78**	2	**5**	**3**
2012	HOU	**16**	**16**	**351**	1,424	4.1	89.0	46	15	40	217	5.4	23	2	3	2
2013	HOU	8	8	121	542	4.5	67.8	23	1	22	183	8.3	41	1	0	0
2014	HOU	13	13	260	1,246	4.8	95.8	51	8	38	327	8.6	56	**5**	2	2
2015	HOU	4	4	63	163	2.6	40.8	16	1	22	227	10.3	32	2	2	1
2016	MIA	4	2	22	55	2.5	13.8	9	0	6	78	13.0	50	0	1	0
Career		80	70	1,476	6,527	4.4	81.6	74	54	255	2,346	9.2	78	14	17	11

=== College ===
Season	Team	GP	Rushing						Receiving				
Season	Team	GP	Att	Yds	Avg	Y/G	Lng	TD	Rec	Yds	Avg	Lng	TD
2005	Tennessee	11	183	879	4.8	79.9	66	5	14	148	10.6	39	0
2006	Tennessee	11	91	322	3.5	29.3	24	5	11	88	8.0	15	0
2007	Tennessee	14	245	1,193	4.9	85.2	59	12	39	340	8.7	65	2
2008	Tennessee	12	131	570	4.4	47.5	41	1	19	166	8.7	26	0
Career		48	650	2,964	4.6	61.8	66	23	83	742	8.9	65	2

=== High school ===
Note: Incomplete

Season	Team	GP	Rushing att	Rushing yds	YPA	Yds/G	TD
2003	MBHS	9	174	1,596	9.2	177.3	17

== Career highlights ==
=== Awards and honors ===
NFL

- First-team All-Pro (2010)
- Second-team All-Pro (2011)
- 4× Pro Bowl (2010–2012, 2014)
- 2× NFL rushing touchdowns leader (2010, 2012)
- NFL rushing yards leader (2010)
- 4× NFL Top 100 — 25th (2011), 25th (2012), 8th (2013), 80th (2015)

College

- Second-team All-SEC (2007)

=== Records ===
==== NFL records ====
- Most rushing yards against the Indianapolis Colts: (231)
- Most rushing yards in first three playoff games of career: (425)
- First player in NFL history to have 100+ rushing yards in his first three postseason games

==== Texans franchise records ====
- Most career rushing yards (6,472)
- Most career rushing touchdowns (54)
- Most rushing yards in a single season: 1,616 (2010)
- Most rushing touchdowns in a single season: 16 (2010)

== Film and television ==
From a young age, Foster expressed a creative interest in activities outside sports, such as poetry in elementary school, and improvisation and theater in high school. Foster first appeared on television as an actor, and not an athlete, as a guest star of the show Hawaii Five-0 in an episode that takes place during the Pro Bowl. He played himself, aiding Danno and McGarrett as they solved the murder of a tech executive, while Foster was in town for the game.

After getting injured in the 2013 season, Foster joined the cast of the movie Draft Day, to play a running back getting drafted into the NFL. The film came out in April 2014. Foster has not ruled out acting once again. In an interview on the subject he stated, "I thoroughly enjoyed my experiences in the film industry thus far. So I don't see why, if an opportunity presents itself again, I wouldn't jump on it, but it won't get in the way of my football career because that's first and foremost. That was my dream since I was seven years old."

In 2015, Foster was one of the narrators for the documentary film Unity. On March 8, 2017, Foster appeared on Joe Rogan's podcast the Joe Rogan Experience #928. He responded to comments he made on Twitter about being able to kill a wolf, and discussed his interest in physics, astronomy, artistic endeavors, and his uncensored take on the NCAA and the NFL. Foster also made a guest appearance on the YouTube podcast Painkiller Already (PKA) during which he gave his opinions on the NFL's battle with CTE and continued with his ideas on killing a wolf. He also told his struggles about dealing with the instantaneous fame of college football.

Foster started his own podcast, Now What? with Arian Foster, in fall 2017. The podcast (also available on YouTube) features Foster conversing with guests on a wide range of topics "from current events to unexplored regions of our universe."

In 2017 Foster also had a cameo in the movie Baywatch starring Dwayne Johnson and Zac Efron.

In 2018, Foster appeared on the MTV series The Challenge: Champs vs. Stars as a contestant raising money for his charity the Arian Foster Foundation.

In February 2021, Foster and PFT Commenter launched a podcast for Barstool Sports. Their podcast, Macrodosing, discusses conspiracy theories and cover-ups, and elements such as the deep web.

== Music career ==
Bobby Feeno
- Born: Arian Isa Foster; August 24, 1986 (age 40); Albuquerque, New Mexico
- Genre: Hip hop
- Instrument: Vocals
- Years active: 2018–present
- Label: Uninterrupted

On April 26, 2018, Foster released his debut rap album Flamingo & Koval under the stage name Bobby Feeno on Tidal. The title is named after the intersection at which rapper 2Pac was shot. The album was recorded under LeBron James’s record label Uninterrupted. His introduction into the music industry was documented in the docuseries Becoming Bobby Feeno which was produced by Foster, James, Maverick Carter, and Humble Lukanga.

== Personal life ==
As was documented on ESPN's Sunday NFL Countdown, Foster was a philosophy major at the University of Tennessee and is an avid writer of poetry. His first name is an abbreviated form of Aquarian, which means "water bearer", or, according to his father, "holder of knowledge".

Sporting News called Foster "the most interesting man in the NFL". He became a vegan in July 2012, though this did not last very long.

Foster revealed his political affiliation during an NFL game, stating he is "in the Green Party", and he voted for Ron Paul, who ran as a Republican in the 2012 Presidential election.

Foster was raised as a Muslim, but has since renounced religion and now identifies as an atheist.

== See also ==
- List of Afro-Latinos
