= Cody Riggs =

American football player (born 1991)

No. 37, 28
- Position: Cornerback

Personal information
- Born: December 30, 1991 (age 34); Fort Lauderdale, Florida, U.S.
- Listed height: 5 ft 9 in (1.75 m)
- Listed weight: 185 lb (84 kg)

Career information
- High school: St. Thomas Aquinas (Fort Lauderdale)
- College: Florida, Notre Dame
- NFL draft: 2015: undrafted

Career history
- Tennessee Titans (2015–2016); Tampa Bay Buccaneers (2016–2017)*; Orlando Apollos (2019)
- * Offseason or practice squad member only

Career NFL statistics
- Total tackles: 14
- Forced fumbles: 1
- Fumble recoveries: 1
- Pass deflections: 2
- Stats at Pro Football Reference

Cody Tyler Riggs (born December 30, 1991) is an American former professional football player who was a cornerback in the National Football League (NFL). He played college football for the Florida Gators and Notre Dame Fighting Irish.

== Early life ==
Riggs attended St. Thomas Aquinas High School in Fort Lauderdale, Florida. He was predominately a running back before switching to defensive back as a junior. He recorded 25 tackles, picked off eight passes and batted down a team record of 24 others during his senior season. At Aquinas, Riggs was teammates with Lamarcus Joyner, Brandon Linder, Giovani Bernard, James White, Dezmen Southward, Bobby Hart, Duron Carter, Marcus Roberson, and Rashad Greene. He participated in the 2010 Under Armour All-America Game in St. Petersburg, Florida.

Considered a four-star recruit by Rivals.com, he was rated as the 11th best cornerback prospect of his class. Riggs committed to Florida over offers from Georgia, Notre Dame and Tennessee.

== College career ==
As a true freshman, Riggs played in all 13 games, including a start in the 2011 Outback Bowl vs. Penn State, which he recorded an interception. He made 10 starts as a sophomore, recording 31 tackles on the season, including 1.5 for loss. He only played in two games as a junior before fracturing his foot against Texas A&M, and received a medical redshirt. He returned as a senior, moving to safety for the Gators. He started all 12 games, finishing fourth on the team in tackles with 51, adding 6.5 for loss.

On February 5, 2014, Florida head coach Will Muschamp confirmed that Riggs would spend his final season of eligibility at another school following his graduation from the university. On February 19, 2014, Riggs confirmed that he was transferring to the University of Notre Dame.

In his final season in college, he moved back to cornerback for the Irish. He started 11 games, missing two due to an ankle injury. He recorded 36 tackles, one interception, three pass breakups and one forced fumble.

== Professional career ==
=== Tennessee Titans ===
Riggs went undrafted in the 2015 NFL draft but signed a free-agent contract with Tennessee Titans following the draft.

On September 8, 2016, Riggs was released by the Titans. On September 12, 2016, he was re-signed by the Titans. On November 7, Riggs was again released by the Titans.

=== Tampa Bay Buccaneers ===
On November 22, 2016, Riggs was signed to the Buccaneers' practice squad. He signed a reserve/future contract with the Buccaneers on January 2, 2017.

On September 2, 2017, Riggs was waived by the Buccaneers. He was re-signed to their practice squad on December 6, 2017.

=== Orlando Apollos ===
In August 2018, Riggs joined the Orlando Apollos of the Alliance of American Football, eventually making the team's 2019 roster. The league ceased operations in April 2019.

== Personal life ==
Cody's father, Gerald Riggs, was a three-time Pro Bowl running back in the NFL for 10 seasons. His older brother, Gerald Riggs Jr., was a running back at Tennessee, who played briefly with the Miami Dolphins and Chicago Bears before playing three seasons with the Toronto Argonauts of the CFL. His uncle, Bobby Brown, was a wide receiver at the University of Notre Dame from 1996–1999.
