= Kevin Burnett =

American football player (born 1982)

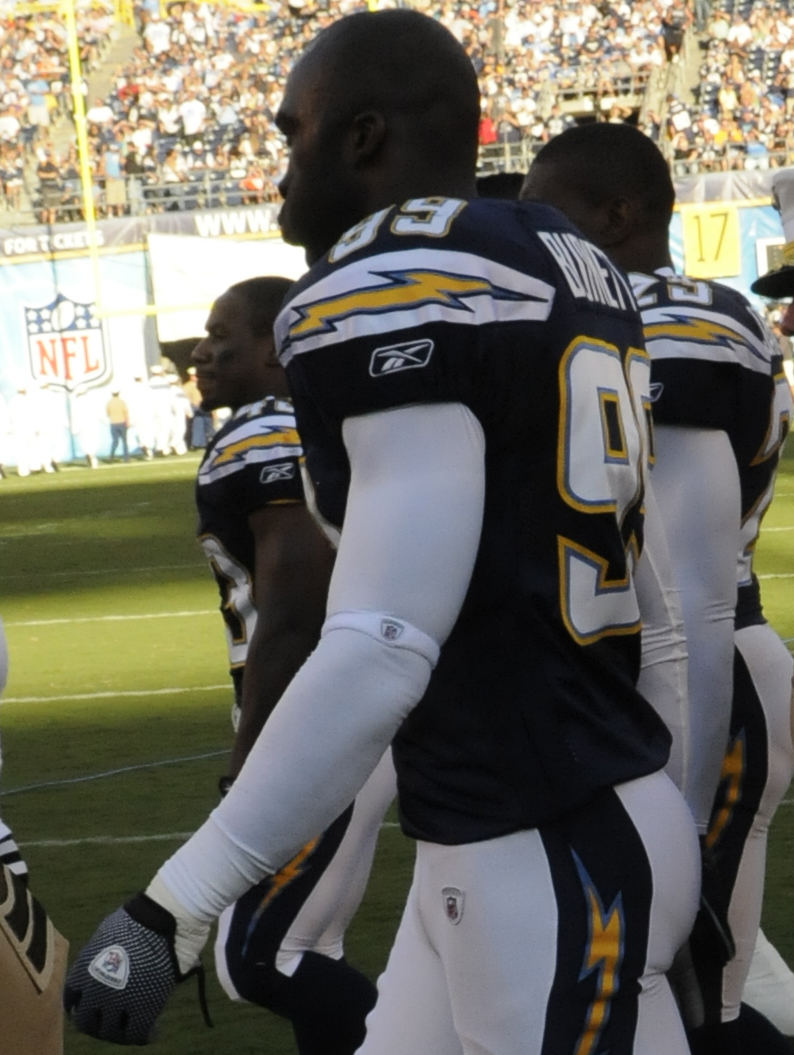
- Burnett with the San Diego Chargers in 2010

No. 57, 99, 47, 56, 94
- Position: Linebacker

Personal information
- Born: December 24, 1982 (age 43); Inglewood, California, U.S.
- Listed height: 6 ft 3 in (1.91 m)
- Listed weight: 240 lb (109 kg)

Career information
- High school: Dominguez (Compton, California)
- College: Tennessee
- NFL draft: 2005: 2nd round, 42nd overall pick

Career history
- Dallas Cowboys (2005–2008); San Diego Chargers (2009–2010); Miami Dolphins (2011–2012); Oakland Raiders (2013)

Awards and highlights
- First-team All-American (2004); First-team All-SEC (2004); Second-team All-SEC (2003)

Career NFL statistics
- Games played: 136
- Total tackles: 630
- Sacks: 20
- Forced fumbles: 10
- Fumble recoveries: 2
- Interceptions: 5
- Defensive touchdowns: 3
- Stats at Pro Football Reference

Kevin Bradley Burnett (born December 24, 1982) is an American former professional football player who was a linebacker in the National Football League (NFL) for the Dallas Cowboys, San Diego Chargers, Miami Dolphins and Oakland Raiders. He played college football for the Tennessee Volunteers and was selected in the second round of the 2005 NFL draft.

== Early life ==
Burnett attended Carson High School, before transferring after his sophomore season to Dominguez High School. He played safety and running back while helping his team reach two consecutive playoff appearances.

As a senior, he had 48 carries for 650 yards and 16 touchdowns. He was a member of the 1999 Prep Star All-American team, a second-team All-State choice, and a member of the "Best of the West" by the Long Beach Press-Telegram.

== College career ==
Burnett accepted a football scholarship from the University of Tennessee. As a true freshman in 2000, he was switched from free safety to outside linebacker midway through the season and played mainly on special teams.

As a sophomore in 2001, he started 2 games, finishing with 52 tackles (6.5 for loss), 3.5 sacks and 3 passes defensed. In 2002, he was lost for the year after suffering a torn anterior cruciate ligament in his left knee during the season opener.

As a junior in 2003, he started 12 out of 13 games, posting 90 tackles (7.5 for loss), 8 quarterback pressures, 1. 5 sacks and 3 passes defensed. He was named honorable-mention All-SEC and along with Michael Muñoz, became the first Vols juniors since 1944 to serve as team captains.

As a senior in 2004, he registered 120 tackles (second on the team), 6 tackles for loss, 7 special teams tackles (tied for the team lead), one sack, one interception. Against the University of Florida, he tallied a career-high with 16 tackles (10 solo). Along with Michael Muñoz, became the first Vols two-time captains since J. G. Lowe earned that honor in 1924–1925. He received first-team All-SEC and All-American honors. Burnett was also a semi-finalist for the Dick Butkus and Chuck Bednarik Awards.

== Professional career ==
=== Dallas Cowboys ===
Burnett was selected by the Dallas Cowboys in the second round (42nd overall) of the 2005 NFL draft. He played sparingly as a rookie, after having problems with injuries in both of his knees. He was placed on the injured reserve list on December 29, after tearing his right ACL during a practice. He finished the season with 11 special teams tackles (tied for fourth on the team).

In 2006, he was the backup behind DeMarcus Ware, posting 40 tackles (29 solo), 16 special teams tackles (second on the team), one sack, 2 forced fumbles, one interception (returned for a touchdown against Peyton Manning).

The next year, he was a backup at inside linebacker and started 2 games in place of Akin Ayodele. He registered 52 tackles (eighth on the team), 46 solo tackles, 18 special teams tackles (tied for third on the team), 2 passes defensed and one forced fumble. In 2008, he finished with 2 starts, 38 tackles (29 solo), 2 sacks and 3 passes defensed.

During his time with the Cowboys he proved to be a quality backup (he only started 4 games), that was valuable as a coverage linebacker and special teams player. He played mostly in the nickel and dime defense.

=== San Diego Chargers ===
On March 10, 2009, he signed as a free agent with the San Diego Chargers, looking to become a starter. He played in 11 games (7 starts), posting 66 tackles (49 solo), 2.5 sacks, and one pass defensed.

In 2010, he started every game at inside linebacker, finishing with 95 tackles (80 solo), six sacks (tied for third on the team), two interceptions, and two forced fumbles. He contributed to the Chargers leading the NFL in total defense and pass defense, while ranking fourth against the run.

=== Miami Dolphins ===
On July 29, 2011, he signed as a free agent with the Miami Dolphins, reuniting with head coach Tony Sparano, who was the offensive line coach during his time with the Cowboys. He started every game, registering 105 tackles (second on the team) and 2.5 sacks. He joined Yeremiah Bell (107 tackles) and Karlos Dansby (103 tackles), to mark the first time in franchise history that three players had 100 or more tackles in the same season.

In 2012, he had career-highs with 110 tackles (80 solo), 2.5 sacks, and five passes defensed. In 2013, after the team signed free agents Philip Wheeler and Dannell Ellerbe, he was released on March 12.

=== Oakland Raiders ===
On March 17, 2013, Burnett was signed by the Oakland Raiders as a free agent. He started all 16 games primarily at weakside linebacker, finishing with 129 tackles (third on the team), 2.5 sacks, one interception, 2 forced fumbles and one fumble recovery. Along with his brother Kaelin, they became the first set of brothers in franchise history to play in the same regular-season game.

In 2014, after not being able to recover from an injured ankle he suffered in the second organized team activities session, he was waived on July 24.

=== NFL statistics ===
Years	Team	GP	COMB	TOTAL	AST	SACK	FF	FR	FR YDS	INT	IR YDS	AVG IR	LNG IR	TD	PD
2005	DAL	13	17	13	4	1.0	0	0	0	0	0	0	0	0	0
2006	DAL	16	40	29	11	1.0	2	0	0	1	39	39	39	1	2
2007	DAL	16	53	46	7	0.0	1	0	0	0	0	0	0	0	2
2008	DAL	16	38	29	9	2.0	1	0	0	0	0	0	0	0	3
2009	SD	11	66	49	17	2.5	0	0	0	0	0	0	0	0	1
2010	SD	16	95	80	15	6.0	2	1	0	2	31	16	29	1	5
2011	MIA	16	106	84	22	2.5	0	0	0	1	34	34	34	1	3
2012	MIA	16	110	80	30	2.5	1	0	0	0	0	0	0	0	5
2013	OAK	16	105	83	22	2.5	3	1	3	1	0	0	0	0	4
Career		136	630	493	137	20.0	10	2	0	5	104	21	39	3	25

== Personal life ==
Burnett is the cousin of Amir Johnson, played forward in the NBA. His brother Kaelin Burnett played linebacker in the NFL. He is a member of the Omega Psi Phi fraternity, initiated Spring 2004 via Iota Beta chapter.
