= Bobby Hart (American football) =

American football player (born 1994)

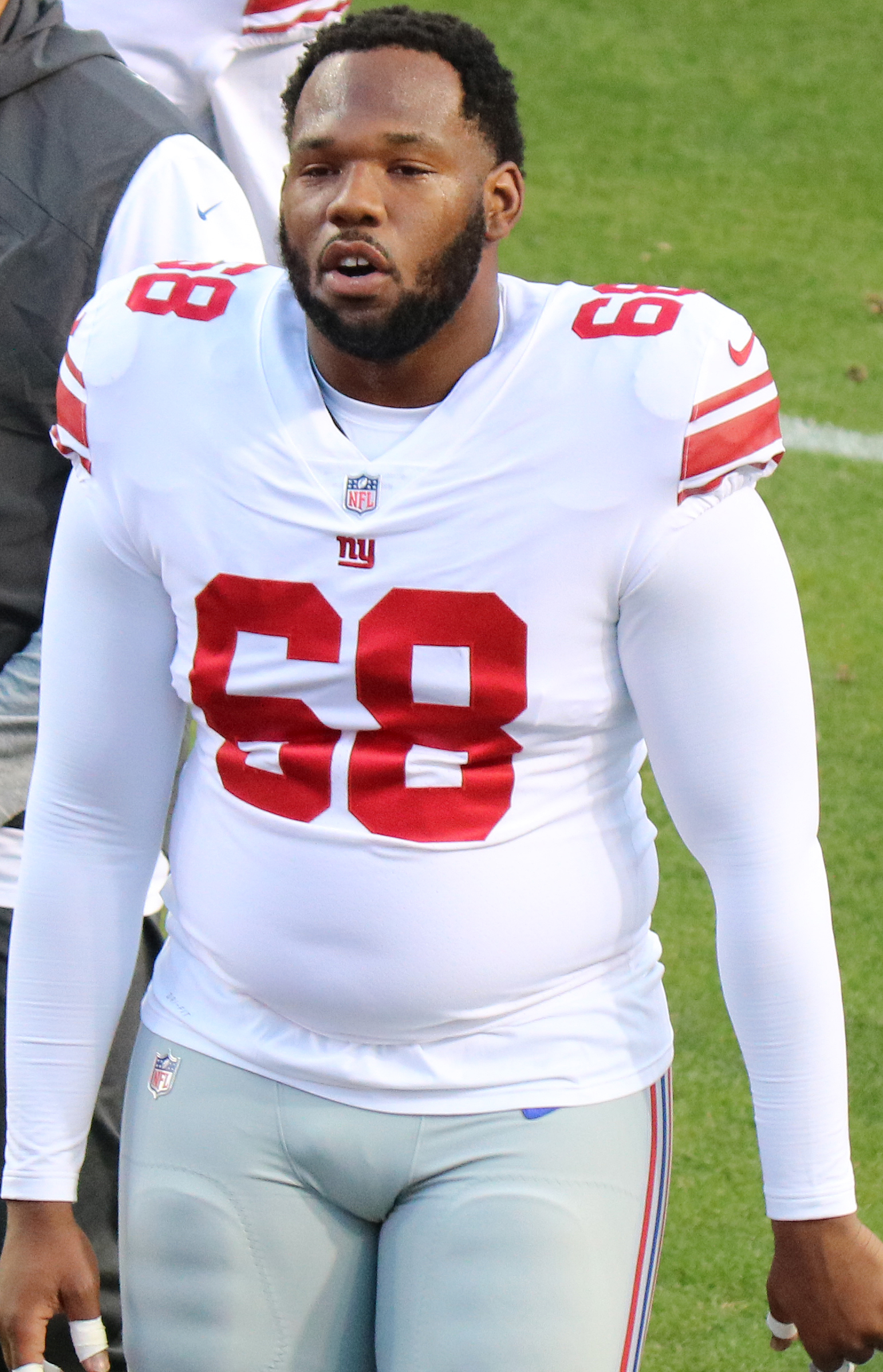
- Hart with the New York Giants in 2017

No. 68 – Seattle Seahawks
- Position: Offensive tackle
- Roster status: Practice squad

Personal information
- Born: August 21, 1994 (age 32); Lauderhill, Florida, U.S.
- Listed height: 6 ft 5 in (1.96 m)
- Listed weight: 310 lb (141 kg)

Career information
- High school: St. Thomas Aquinas (Fort Lauderdale, Florida)
- College: Florida State (2011–2014)
- NFL draft: 2015: 7th round, 226th overall pick

Career history
- New York Giants (2015–2017); Cincinnati Bengals (2018–2020); Buffalo Bills (2021)*; Miami Dolphins (2021)*; Buffalo Bills (2021)*; Tennessee Titans (2021); Buffalo Bills (2021–2022); Detroit Lions (2023)*; Washington Commanders (2024)*; Los Angeles Chargers (2025); Seattle Seahawks (2026–present)
- * Offseason or practice squad member only

Awards and highlights
- BCS national champion (2013); Third-team All-ACC (2014)

Career NFL statistics as of Week 9, 2026
- Games played: 109
- Games started: 75
- Stats at Pro Football Reference

Bobby Hart (born August 21, 1994) is an American professional football offensive tackle for the Seattle Seahawks of the National Football League (NFL). He played college football for the Florida State Seminoles and was selected by the New York Giants in the seventh round of the 2015 NFL draft. Hart has also played in the NFL for the Cincinnati Bengals, Tennessee Titans, Buffalo Bills, and Los Angeles Chargers.

== Early life ==
A native of Lauderhill, Florida, Hart attended St. Thomas Aquinas High School in Fort Lauderdale, Florida, where he was teammates with Giovani Bernard, Rashad Greene, Lamarcus Joyner, Cody Riggs, Marcus Roberson, and James White.

== College career ==
Hart started every game in his junior and senior years. As a senior at Florida State, Hart was named to the third-team All-Atlantic Coast Conference (ACC).

== Professional career ==
Pre-draft measurables
Height	Weight	Arm length	Hand span	Wingspan	40-yard dash	10-yard split	20-yard split	20-yard shuttle	Three-cone drill	Vertical jump	Broad jump	Bench press
6 ft 4 3/4 in (1.95 m)	329 lb (149 kg)	33 in (0.84 m)	10 1/8 in (0.26 m)	6 ft 10 in (2.08 m)	5.61 s	1.96 s	3.22 s	5.15 s	8.08 s	27.0 in (0.69 m)	7 ft 11 in (2.41 m)	22 reps
All measurables are from the NFL Combine, and all drills are from Florida State's Pro Day.

=== New York Giants ===
Hart was drafted by the New York Giants in the seventh round, 226th overall, in the 2015 NFL draft. When the Giants drafted Hart, they projected him as a guard in the NFL. To prepare for the switch, he worked out with former Pro Bowl center LeCharles Bentley. Hart, though, stayed primarily at right tackle in 2015. In 2016, Hart started 13 games at right tackle.

Hart entered the 2017 season as the Giants' second right tackle, appearing in 10 games for the team (including seven starts). He was waived/injured by the Giants on December 30, 2017, with an ankle injury and was placed on injured reserve after refusing to play in the team's season finale. On February 9, 2018, Hart was released by the Giants.

=== Cincinnati Bengals ===
On February 14, 2018, Hart signed with the Cincinnati Bengals. He started every game at right tackle for the team during the regular season. On March 11, 2019, Hart signed a three-year, $16.15 million contract extension with the Bengals.

Hart started all 16 games in 2019. In 2020, he played in 14 games, starting 13, and was ranked 35th of 52 offensive tackles by Pro Football Focus.

On March 19, 2021, Hart was released by the Bengals.

=== Buffalo Bills (first stint) ===
On March 30, 2021, Hart signed a one-year contract with the Buffalo Bills. On August 31, Hart was released by the Bills during final roster cuts.

=== Miami Dolphins ===
On September 7, 2021, Hart was signed to the practice squad of the Miami Dolphins. He was released from the practice squad on September 20.

=== Buffalo Bills (second stint) ===
Hart was re-signed to the Buffalo Bills' practice squad on September 22, 2021.

=== Tennessee Titans ===
On October 20, 2021, Hart was signed by the Tennessee Titans off the Bills practice squad, following injuries to linemen Taylor Lewan and Ty Sambrailo. He played three games, starting one, before he was released on November 15. Two days later, Tennessee re–signed Hart to their practice squad.

=== Buffalo Bills (third stint) ===
On November 19, 2021, Hart was signed by the Buffalo Bills off the Titans' practice squad after injuries to linemen Jon Feliciano and Spencer Brown. Hart spent time back on the Bills practice squad after being waived again on December 7 and was briefly placed on the reserve/COVID-19 list before being activated again in Week 16. He was promoted to the active roster on December 27.

On April 11, 2022, Hart signed a one-year contract to return to the Bills. On September 20, Hart was suspended one game for throwing a punch after a game against the Tennessee Titans ended. Throughout the season, Hart saw more playing time as an extra run blocker on certain plays.

=== Detroit Lions ===
On August 7, 2023, Hart signed with the Detroit Lions. On August 27, Hart was released by Detroit as a part of final roster cuts.

=== Washington Commanders ===
Hart signed with the Washington Commanders' practice squad on October 29, 2024. He was signed to a futures contract by the Commanders on February 4, 2025. Hart was released by Washington during final roster cuts on August 27.

=== Los Angeles Chargers ===
On October 1, 2025, Hart signed with the Los Angeles Chargers' practice squad. He was promoted to the active roster on October 11.

=== Seattle Seahawks ===
On June 8, 2026, Hart signed with the Seattle Seahawks. He was released by the Seahawks on August 30 as a part of final roster cuts. On September 3, Hart was re-signed to the team's practice squad.

== Personal life ==
Hart made several posts on Instagram and Twitter in 2020 that received criticism. Some covered topics such as COVID-19, support for DeSean Jackson after he received backlash for some posts seen as antisemitic, and an image that read "Stop Promoting Homosexuality to Our Children!", which was later deleted. Hart later explained his posts, claiming that "I don't mean to offend nobody. I don't discriminate against anybody. I know that everyone thinks differently and I know that I have a platform that sometimes people can see things and take it a certain way and I'm definitely aware of that. As you mature and grow, I talked to the players, coaches and things like that."
