= Derrick Pope =

American gridiron football player (born 1982)

No. 56
- Position: Linebacker

Personal information
- Born: May 4, 1982 (age 44); Galveston, Texas, U.S.
- Listed height: 6 ft 0 in (1.83 m)
- Listed weight: 232 lb (105 kg)

Career information
- High school: Ball (Galveston)
- College: Alabama
- NFL draft: 2004: 7th round, 222nd overall pick

Career history
- Miami Dolphins (2004–2007); Minnesota Vikings (2008)*; Hamilton Tiger-Cats (2009)*
- * Offseason or practice squad member only

Awards and highlights
- First-team All-SEC (2003)

Career NFL statistics
- Total tackles: 149
- Sacks: 2.0
- Forced fumbles: 2
- Fumble recoveries: 2
- Interceptions: 2
- Defensive touchdowns: 1
- Stats at Pro Football Reference

Derrick Trayon Pope (born May 4, 1982) is an American former professional football player who was a linebacker in the National Football League (NFL). He played college football for the Alabama Crimson Tide and was selected by the Miami Dolphins in the seventh round of the 2004 NFL draft.

Pope was also a member of the Minnesota Vikings and the Hamilton Tiger-Cats.

== Early life ==
Pope grew up in Palm Terrace. He was raised by a single mother Stephanie Pope and stepfather Horace Byrd Jr. Pope has two younger siblings Roshawn Pope and Shakari Byrd. Pope has a stepbrother Horace Byrd lll who became the First Male Tornette. He attended Ball High School in Galveston, Texas. He was named as the school's Offensive MVP and first-team All-District selection as a running back. He also played basketball, baseball and ran track. Pope is married to Danielle Venible. Together they have two kids Dalaney an Derrick Jr.

== College career ==
=== Community College ===
Pope played at Garden City Community College for two seasons (2000–01) prior to enrolling at Alabama. As a freshman, he led the team with 127 tackles and twenty sacks, and was a first-team JUCO All-America and first-team All-Jayhawk Conference choice.

He recorded 125 tackles with nine sacks, 16 stops behind the line of scrimmage and returned two fumble recoveries for touchdowns as a sophomore. He was a first-team All-America choice and Region VI Defensive Most Valuable Player at middle linebacker. He added first-team All-Jayhawk Conference accolades.

=== Alabama ===
During his first year at Alabama, Pope saw action in 13 games with three starts at middle linebacker as a junior. He ranked fifth on the team with 65 tackles (37 solo), including a sack, six stops for loss and three quarterback pressures. He also intercepted a pass, caused two fumbles and recovered another.

Pope played in 12 games with ten starts at strongside linebacker as a senior when he served as team captain. He was named a first-team All-Southeastern Conference selection by the Associated Press. He was the recipient of the team's Lee Roy Jordan Headhunter Award. On the year he finished third on the team with 105 tackles (55 solo), including five sacks, nine stops for losses and five quarterback pressures. He also deflected six passes and intercepted another. Following the season, he played in the Senior Bowl and Blue–Gray Football Classic.

In his career, Pope started 13 of 25 games for the Crimson Tide, recording 170 tackles (92 solo) with six sacks, 15 stops for loss, two forced fumbles, a fumble recovery, two interceptions and six pass deflections. Pope was also named Team Captain and had his hands and cleats enshrined at the University of Alabama.

=== Awards and honors ===
- First-team JUCO All-American (2000)
- 2x first-team All-Kansas Jayhawk Community College Conference (2000, 2001)
- Region IV Defensive Most Valuable Player (2001)
- Lee Roy Jordan Headhunter Award (2003)
- First-team Associated Press All-SEC (2003)

== Professional career ==
=== Miami Dolphins ===
Pope was originally drafted by the Miami Dolphins in the seventh-round (222nd overall) in the 2004 NFL draft. He was selected with a pick obtained from the Baltimore Ravens in a draft trade-down. On July 30, 2004, Pope was signed to a four-year deal worth around $2.4 million. The deal included a signing bonus of about $43,000, along with incentives that could increase the contract's value.

Pope impressed the Dolphins' coaching staff early in his professional career and went on to appear in all 16 games, including three starts, in his rookie season. He posted 44 tackles, two sacks, a forced fumble and a fumble recovery which he returned for a touchdown. He also ranked fifth on the squad with nine special teams tackles. He saw action in each of the first 11 games of the season in a reserve role.

Although he did not start, Pope saw extended action at San Francisco on November 28 after Zach Thomas left the game in the first quarter with a hamstring injury. Pope responded with seventeen tackles, his first career sack and a fumble recovery. With 3:10 to play in the game, Pope picked up a Tim Rattay fumble that was forced by Jason Taylor and took it in one yard for a touchdown. The score gave the Dolphins a 24–10 lead in a game they went on to win, 24–17. He became the first defensive rookie to score a touchdown for the Dolphins since Zach Thomas returned an interception 26 yards for a score on November 17, 1996, against the Houston Oilers. Pope's first career start came the following week against the Buffalo Bills, and he kept that spot for three straight weeks before Thomas returned to the lineup. In the Bills game, Pope recorded eight tackles and his second sack in as many weeks. On December 12 against the Denver Broncos, he tallied a season-high 14 tackles and a forced fumble, with the tackle figure leading the team that day.

In 2005, Pope played in 12 games, including two starts, while being inactive for four contests. He posted 23 tackles and a forced fumble on defense and seven stops on special teams unit. He was inactive for the first four games of the season before making his 2005 debut against the Tampa Bay Buccaneers on October 16.

Pope saw extensive action at middle linebacker during the season, but opened game the at Oakland on November 27 and against Buffalo on December 5 at weakside linebacker when Channing Crowder moved to the middle to replace an injured Thomas. Pope recorded seven tackles in the Raiders game, a team high that day, and matched that total the following week in the Bills contest. He had five tackles and a forced fumble the following week against the New York Jets, when he saw extensive time as Crowder left the game early with a shoulder injury. In the game, Pope stripped the ball from running back Cedric Houston with defensive end Matt Roth recovering at the Dolphins’ 39. That led to a Ricky Williams 23-yard touchdown run six plays later. Pope was known to be one of the hardest hitters on the team. In 2007 pope recorded 64 tackles two interceptions and one of those coming from the great Tom Brady

Pope played in a reserve role 11 times and was inactive five times due to a hamstring injury in 2006. On the year, he posted 12 tackles (nine solo). He had a season-high five tackles (three solo) in a 24–20 win over the Minnesota Vikings on November 12.

=== Minnesota Vikings ===
On March 14, 2008, Pope was signed by the Minnesota Vikings. The team's Vice President of Player Personnel, Rick Spielman, was general manager of the Dolphins when Pope was selected in 2004. Pope was later released by the Vikings on August 25, 2008.

=== Hamilton Tiger-Cats ===
Pope signed a practice roster agreement with the Hamilton Tiger-Cats on July 20, 2009. He was released seven days later.

== NFL career statistics ==
Legend
**Bold**	Career high

Year	Team	Games		Tackles					Interceptions					Fumbles			
Year	Team	GP	GS	Cmb	Solo	Ast	Sck	TFL	Int	Yds	TD	Lng	PD	FF	FR	Yds	TD
2004	MIA	**16**	3	44	29	15	**2.0**	3	0	0	0	0	0	**1**	**1**	**1**	**1**
2005	MIA	12	2	29	23	6	0.0	**4**	0	0	0	0	0	**1**	0	0	0
2006	MIA	11	0	12	9	3	0.0	0	0	0	0	0	0	0	0	0	0
2007	MIA	**16**	**9**	**64**	**43**	**21**	0.0	2	**2**	0	0	0	**3**	0	**1**	0	0
Career		55	14	149	104	45	2.0	9	2	0	0	0	3	2	2	1	1
