= Michael Muñoz =

Michael or Mike Muñoz may refer to:

- Mike Munoz (baseball) (born 1965), baseball relief pitcher
- Mike Muñoz (soccer) (born 1983), American soccer coach and former player
- Michael Muñoz (American football), American gridiron football player

== See also ==
- Miki Muñoz, Spanish football player
