= Kevin Simon =

American football player and coach (born 1983)

No. 54
- Position: Linebacker

Personal information
- Born: June 12, 1983 (age 43); Walnut Creek, California, U.S.
- Listed height: 5 ft 11 in (1.80 m)
- Listed weight: 234 lb (106 kg)

Career information
- High school: De La Salle (Concord, California)
- College: Tennessee
- NFL draft: 2006: 7th round, 250th overall pick

Career history
- Washington Redskins (2006)*
- * Offseason or practice squad member only

Awards and highlights
- 2× Second-team All-SEC (2003, 2005)

Kevin Simon (born June 12, 1983) is an American former football player. He was recently an NFL scout for the Atlanta Falcons and the director of player development for the University of Tennessee football team. He was a scout for the Dallas Cowboys from 2009 to 2016. He was selected by the Washington Redskins in the seventh round of the 2006 NFL draft with the 250th overall pick. Simon played at Tennessee from 2001 to 2004. He was a star linebacker and running back at De La Salle High School in Concord, California from 1997 to 2001. He played in the first ever U.S. Army All-American Bowl on December 30, 2000, alongside fellow Tennessee Volunteer Cedric Houston. In 2022, he became the linebackers coach and head of college scouting at Knoxville Catholic High School.

Pre-draft measurables
Height	Weight	Arm length	Hand span	40-yard dash	10-yard split	20-yard split	20-yard shuttle	Three-cone drill	Vertical jump	Broad jump	Bench press
5 ft 10 in (1.78 m)	235 lb (107 kg)	31 5/8 in (0.80 m)	8 3/4 in (0.22 m)	4.83 s	1.69 s	2.85 s	4.16 s	7.03 s	28.0 in (0.71 m)	8 ft 7 in (2.62 m)	26 reps
All values from NFL Combine/Pro Day
