= Gerald Riggs =

American football player (born 1960)

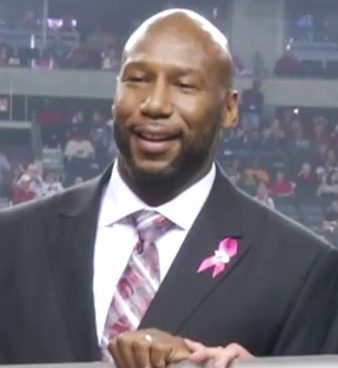
- Riggs in 2013

No. 42, 37
- Position: Running back

Personal information
- Born: November 6, 1960 (age 65); Tullos, Louisiana, U.S.
- Listed height: 6 ft 1 in (1.85 m)
- Listed weight: 230 lb (104 kg)

Career information
- High school: Bonanza (Las Vegas, Nevada)
- College: Arizona State
- NFL draft: 1982: 1st round, 9th overall pick

Career history
- Atlanta Falcons (1982–1988); Washington Redskins (1989–1991)

Awards and highlights
- Super Bowl champion (XXVI); Second-team All-Pro (1985); 3× Pro Bowl (1985–1987); Atlanta Falcons Ring of Honor; First-team All-Pac-10 (1981)

Career NFL statistics
- Rushing yards: 8,188
- Rushing average: 4.1
- Rushing touchdowns: 69
- Stats at Pro Football Reference

Gerald Antonio Riggs (born November 6, 1960) is an American former professional football player who was a running back in the National Football League (NFL) for the Atlanta Falcons from 1982 to 1988 and the Washington Redskins from 1989 to 1991.

== Early life ==
Before his NFL career, he attended Bonanza High School in Las Vegas, Nevada and after graduation attended Arizona State University in Tempe, Arizona. He played sparingly in 1978, running for 410 yards and four touchdowns along with 10 catches for 126 yards. In 1979, he ran for 363 yards with three touchdowns and 14 catches for 120 yards and one touchdown. In 1980, he continued in a backup role and ran for 422 yards with four touchdowns with 15 catches for 165 yards. As a starter in 1981, he ran for 891 yards with six touchdowns and an average of six yards per carry, while also recording 11 catches for 139 yards in 11 games.

He would close out his collegiate career with 2,086 yards and 17 touchdowns on the ground and 50 catches for 550 yards. In the 1982 NFL draft, he was selected in the first round with the ninth overall pick by Atlanta.

== Professional career ==
Riggs made the Pro Bowl three times in his career from 1985 to 1987. His best season was in 1985, when he rushed for 1,719 yards and ten touchdowns, while also catching 33 passes for 267 yards. His 1,719 rushing yards is the most for a player on a team that finished with a losing season. In the three seasons from 1984 to 1986, Riggs amassed a whopping 5,212 combined rushing and receiving yards, and scored 32 touchdowns. In his seven years with the Falcons, he rushed for 6,631 yards, making him the franchise all-time leading rusher, a mark he still holds as of 2026. In April 1989, Riggs was traded to the Washington Redskins, who planned to pair him with Earnest Byner. In the September 17 game against the Philadelphia Eagles, Riggs set a new franchise record for rushing yards in a game with 221 at RFK Stadium. He had a team-leading 834 yards that year. His 7,465 rushing yards in the 1980s was the fifth most in the decade for all running backs.

In his final year of 1991, Riggs rushed for 248 yards and 11 touchdowns, assisting his team to a 14–2 record. He is the only player to rush for 11 touchdowns in fewer than 80 attempts in a single season. He went on to rush for four touchdowns in Washington's two playoff games leading up to Super Bowl XXVI. In the game against the Buffalo Bills, Riggs was tasked with short-yardage situations and ran five times for seven yards for two touchdowns as Washington defeated Buffalo 37–24. His six rushing touchdowns in the postseason tied an NFL record that was not surpassed until 1997. He was waived by Washington in August 1992 and he ultimately never played again.

Riggs finished his ten NFL seasons with 8,188 rushing yards and 69 touchdowns, along with 201 receptions for 1,516 yards. Riggs holds the NFL all-time record for most receptions (201) without a receiving touchdown. He was inducted into the Atlanta Falcons Ring of Honor in 2013. In 2018, he was inducted into the Atlanta Sports Hall of Fame.

== Personal life ==
He is the father of Gerald Riggs, Jr., former running back at the University of Tennessee, who played for the Miami Dolphins, and Cody Riggs, a cornerback for the Tennessee Titans.

== NFL career statistics ==
Legend
	Won the Super Bowl
	Led the league
**Bold**	Career high

Year	Team	Games		Rushing						Receiving					Fumbles	
Year	Team	GP	GS	Att	Yds	Avg	Y/G	Lng	TD	Rec	Yds	Avg	Lng	TD	Fum	FR
1982	ATL	9	0	78	299	3.8	33.2	37	5	23	185	8.0	15	0	1	0
1983	ATL	14	0	100	437	**4.4**	31.2	40	8	17	149	8.8	25	0	7	1
1984	ATL	15	14	353	1,486	4.3	99.1	57	**13**	**42**	**277**	6.6	21	0	**11**	**2**
1985	ATL	**16**	**16**	**397**	**1,719**	4.3	**107.4**	50	10	33	267	8.1	44	0	6	1
1986	ATL	**16**	15	343	1,327	3.9	82.9	31	9	24	136	5.7	11	0	6	1
1987	ATL	12	12	203	875	4.3	72.9	44	2	25	199	8.0	**48**	0	4	1
1988	ATL	9	9	113	488	4.3	54.2	34	1	22	171	7.8	30	0	3	0
1989	WAS	12	7	201	834	4.1	69.5	**58**	4	7	67	**9.6**	13	0	3	0
1990	WAS	10	0	123	475	3.9	47.5	20	6	7	60	8.6	18	0	2	1
1991	WAS	**16**	0	78	248	3.2	15.5	32	11	1	5	5.0	5	0	1	0
Career		129	73	1,989	8,188	4.1	63.5	58	69	201	1,516	7.5	48	0	38	6
