= Wesley Britt =

American football player (born 1981)

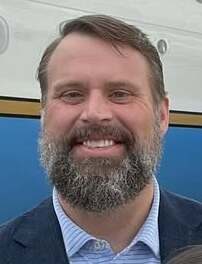
- Britt in 2025

No. 65
- Position: Offensive tackle

Personal information
- Born: November 21, 1981 (age 44); Cullman, Alabama, U.S.
- Listed height: 6 ft 8 in (2.03 m)
- Listed weight: 300 lb (136 kg)

Career information
- High school: Cullman
- College: Alabama
- NFL draft: 2005: 5th round, 167th overall pick

Career history
- San Diego Chargers (2005)*; New England Patriots (2005–2008)
- * Offseason or practice squad member only

Awards and highlights
- Third-team All-American (2004); Jacobs Blocking Trophy (2004); 3× First-team All-SEC (2002, 2003, 2004)

Career NFL statistics
- Games played: 16
- Games started: 2
- Stats at Pro Football Reference

Wesley Britt (born November 21, 1981) is an American former professional football player who was a offensive tackle for three seasons with the New England Patriots in the National Football League (NFL). He played college football for the Alabama Crimson Tide and received third-team All-American and a first-team All-SEC honors as a senior. Selected by the San Diego Chargers in the fifth round of the 2005 NFL draft, Britt was released before making the final roster and signed with the Patriots, where he played from 2006 to 2008. He is the husband of U.S. Senator Katie Britt.

== Early life ==
Britt was born in Cullman, Alabama, and attended Cullman High School where he graduated in 2000.

== College career ==
Britt accepted a scholarship offer from the University of Alabama in 2000. After redshirting his first year, Britt was a career starter and started in 46 games throughout the 2001, 2002, 2003 and 2004 seasons at Alabama. He missed the final four games of his junior season after breaking his leg against Tennessee in 2003. He was named First-team All-American by the CFN, third-team by Associated Press, second-team by Rivals.com as a senior in 2004, three time First-team All-Southeastern Conference by the Associated Press and league's coaches in 2002, 2003, 2004, and named to 2004 SEC Good Works Team. Wesley also won the Jacobs Blocking Trophy as the SEC's top offensive lineman in 2004.

== Professional career ==
=== San Diego Chargers ===
Britt was selected in the fifth round (164th overall) by the San Diego Chargers in the 2005 NFL draft. He was released by the Chargers on September 4, 2005.

=== New England Patriots ===
Britt was signed to the practice squad of the New England Patriots on September 5, 2005, where he spent the season. He made the Patriots' 53-man roster in 2006, and made his first career start in Week 4 against the Cincinnati Bengals. He would go on to play in 10 total games in 2006. The next season, Britt was active for four games, starting the season finale against the New York Giants. He did not start any games in 2008 and was active for two total games. Following the season, as a restricted free agent, Britt was not offered a tender by the Patriots, but was re-signed to a separate contract on March 16. He was released by the Patriots during final cuts on September 5, 2009.

== Personal life ==
Wesley Britt married Katie Boyd in 2008. In 2022, Katie Britt was elected to the United States Senate from Alabama. They live in Montgomery, Alabama, and have two children. Wesley Britt was an economic development representative with Alabama Power and subsequently joined a lobby firm.

His younger brothers, Taylor and Justin, also played football for the University of Alabama.
