= David Pollack =

American football player and analyst (born 1982)

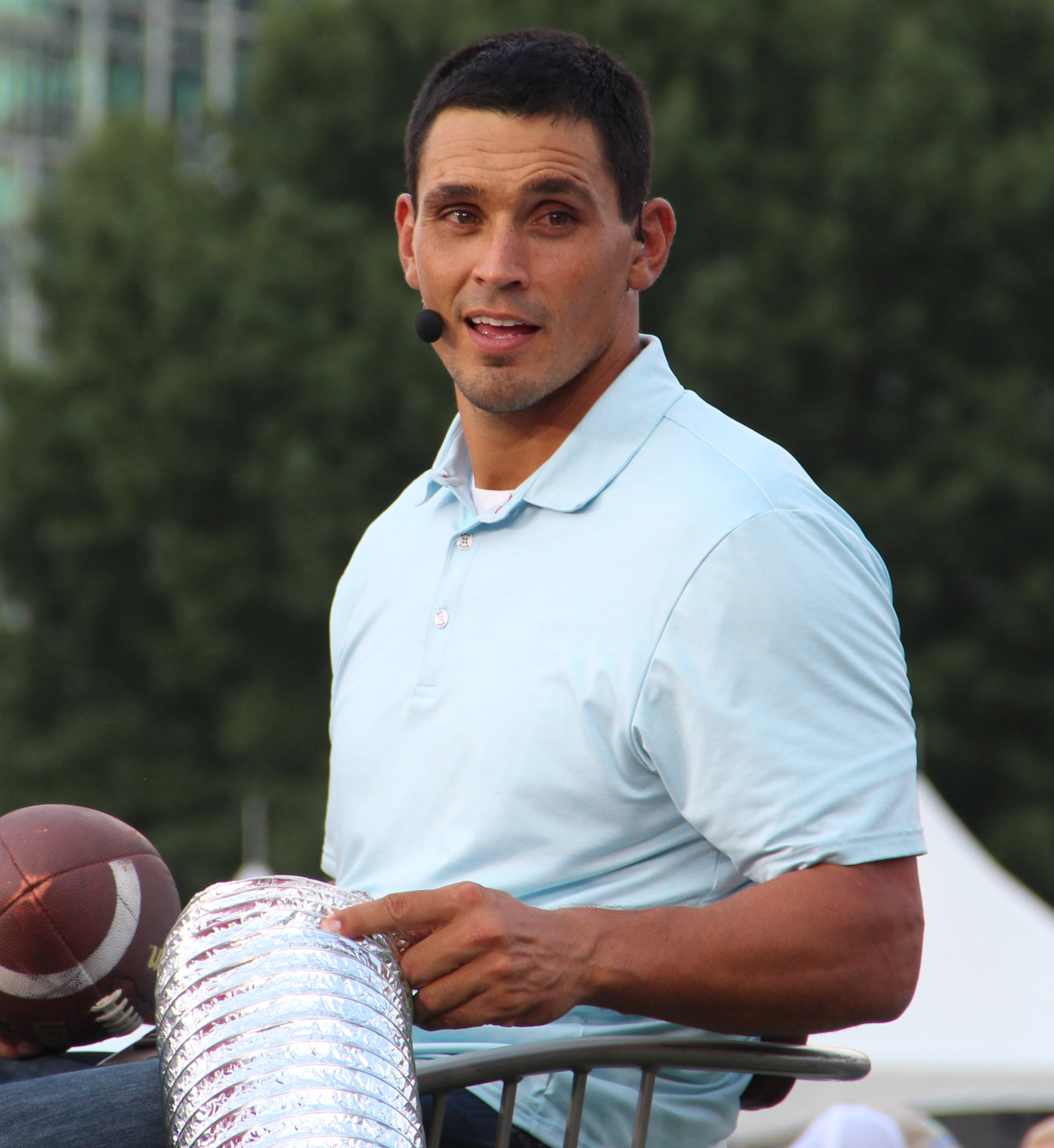
- Pollack in 2018

No. 99
- Position: Linebacker

Personal information
- Born: June 19, 1982 (age 44); New Brunswick, New Jersey, U.S.
- Listed height: 6 ft 2 in (1.88 m)
- Listed weight: 265 lb (120 kg)

Career information
- High school: Shiloh (Snellville, Georgia)
- College: Georgia (2001–2004)
- NFL draft: 2005: 1st round, 17th overall pick

Career history
- Cincinnati Bengals (2005–2007)

Awards and highlights
- Chuck Bednarik Award (2004); Lott Trophy (2004); Lombardi Award (2004); 2× Ted Hendricks Award (2003, 2004); 2× Consensus All-American (2002, 2004); First-team All-American (2003); 2× SEC Defensive Player of the Year (2002, 2004); 3× First-team All-SEC (2002, 2003, 2004); 2005 Outback Bowl MVP; Florida–Georgia Hall of Fame

Career NFL statistics
- Total tackles: 29
- Sacks: 4.5
- Fumble recoveries: 1
- Stats at Pro Football Reference
- College Football Hall of Fame

David M. Pollack (born June 19, 1982) is an American college football analyst and former professional football linebacker who played in the NFL (first round draft pick) before a career ending neck injury. Pollack played college football for the University of Georgia, where he was a three-time All-American, and was recognized as the top defensive player in the nation. Pollack had 36 sacks during his collegiate career, third most in NCAA history. He was a first-round pick in the 2005 NFL draft, and played professionally for the Cincinnati Bengals until he suffered a career-ending neck injury in the second game of his second season. From 2011 to 2023, he worked as a college football analyst for ESPN. Today he leads his own sports show, See Ball Get Ball, and is a keynote speaker for corporate and faith audiences.

== Early life ==
Pollack was born in New Brunswick, New Jersey and family moved to Georgia, where he was exposed to SEC football. He attended Shiloh High School in Snellville, Georgia, and athletic star in football, basketball and wrestling. In football, as a senior, Pollack was a Class 5A All-State selection and the Atlanta Touchdown Club named him the Defensive Lineman of the Year.

== College career ==
Pollack attended the University of Georgia, where he played for coach Mark Richt's Georgia Bulldogs football team from 2001 to 2004, served as Captain and was a roommate of his childhood friend and future NFL quarterback David Greene.

For three consecutive seasons, he was recognized as a first-team All-Southeastern Conference (SEC) selection and a first-team All-American (2002, 2003, 2004)—twice as an NCAA consensus first-team honoree, having received the first-team selections of a majority of All-America selector organizations in 2002 and 2004. He is only the second player in Bulldogs team history to earn first-team All-American honors in three seasons, following Heisman Trophy-winner Herschel Walker. In addition to his All-American accolades, Pollack received the following:

- SEC Player of the Year Award (2002, 2004)
- SEC Defensive Player of the Year Award (2004)
- Chuck Bednarik Award (2004)
- Ted Hendricks Award (2003, 2004)
- Lombardi Award (2004)
- Lott Trophy (2004)

His signature play came during the second game of the 2002 season. Pollack batted down a pass from South Carolina quarterback Corey Jenkins in the South Carolina end zone and managed to catch the ball in the end zone before it hit the ground; Pollack was credited with a 0-yard interception return for a touchdown. Pollack finished his college career with 36 sacks, a Georgia career record, and ranks third in NCAA history.

He graduated from the University of Georgia with a bachelor's degree in history and entered the NFL draft.

== Professional career ==
Pre-draft measurables
Height	Weight	40-yard dash	10-yard split	20-yard split	20-yard shuttle	Three-cone drill	Vertical jump	Broad jump	Bench press
6 ft 2 in (1.88 m)	265 lb (120 kg)	4.75 s	1.67 s	2.71 s	3.94 s	6.87 s	37 in (0.94 m)	10 ft 0 in (3.05 m)	25 reps
All values from NFL Combine.

In his rookie season of 2005, Pollack was a reserve until the Bengals' sixth game, when he became a starter at linebacker. He missed two games due to a sprained knee. However, he still ranked second on the team with 4.5 sacks on the season, and posted 22 tackles and six assists for a total of 28.

In his second NFL season, 2006, he started the Bengals' first game. On September 17, 2006, in game against in-state rival Cleveland Browns, Pollack suffered what was later determined to be a broken sixth cervical vertebrae during a tackle in the first quarter. He reportedly suffered no paralysis, but was taken off the field on a stretcher and underwent surgery to fuse two vertebrae, and was required to wear a halo brace for three months. Pollack's injury was determined to be a possible career-ending one. However, on January 7, 2007, ESPN reported that Pollack would be able to resume his career as long as the rehabilitation process went as planned. On July 11, 2007, it was announced that Pollack would not play at all during the 2007 season as his recovery continued.

On April 22, 2008, Bengals head coach Marvin Lewis announced that Pollack was "not completely comfortable where he [was] medically" and that he would retire.

== Post-football career ==
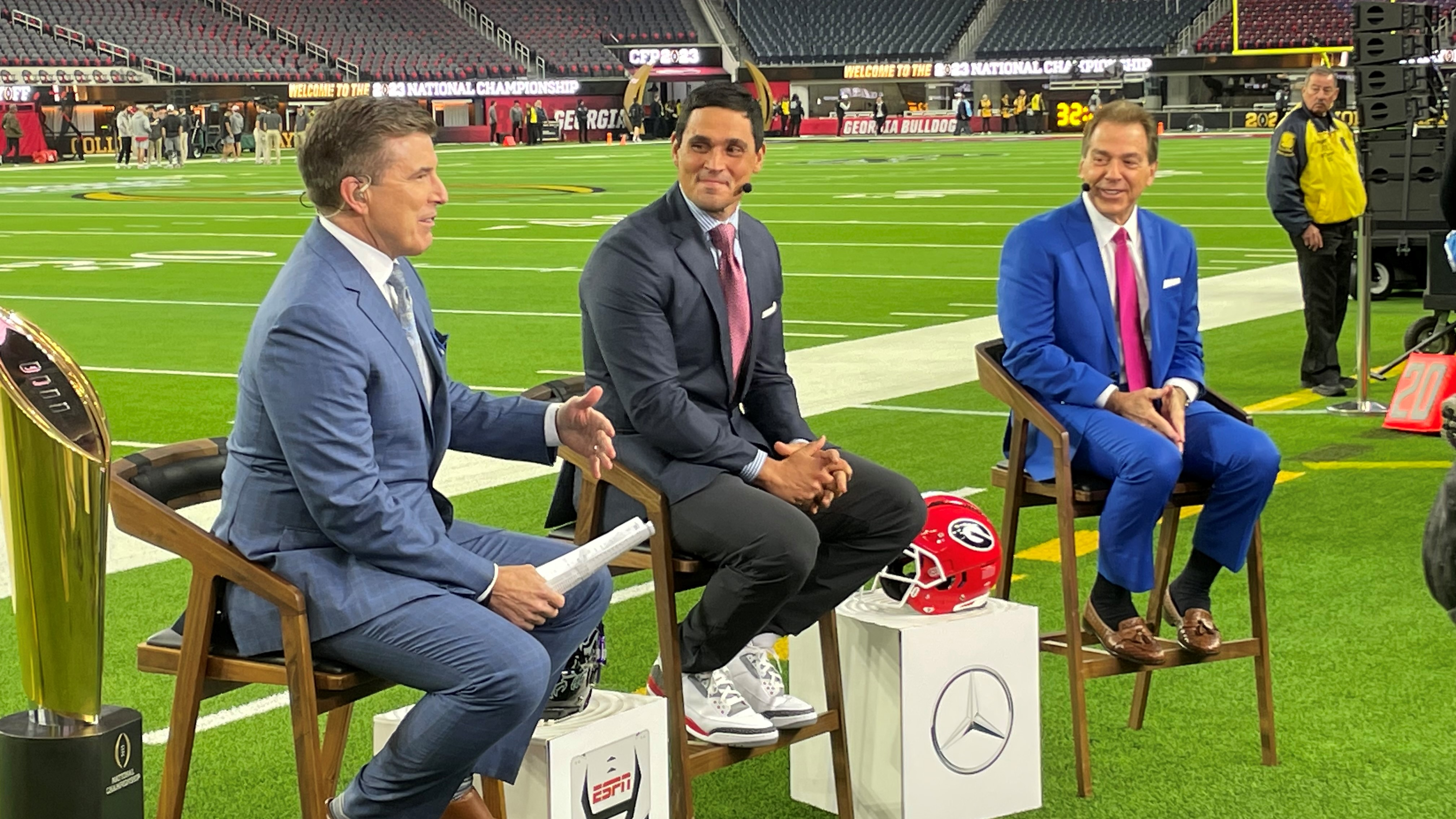
Pollack with Rece Davis and Nick Saban prior to the 2023 National Championship game

Pollack's new company, FanBan, manufactures sports banners that feature sports photographs and college football team logos. FanBan events provided YMCA scholarships that help underprivileged kids participate in YMCA programs as of February 10, 2008.

On September 9, 2008, Pollack began a new career as an afternoon sports talk host on Atlanta's 790 The Zone. Also in 2008, Pollack began studio work for CBS's college football coverage. In 2009, Pollack joined ESPN as a college football analyst.

In fall 2011, he became part of ESPN's College GameDay and a host on the Palmer and Pollack show.

In summer 2012, it was announced that Pollack would join Rece Davis, Jesse Palmer, and Samantha Ponder on ESPN's Thursday Night Football, replacing Craig James.

In October 2013, he received harsh criticism for his public comments that women should not be allowed to serve on the College Football Playoff selection committee because they had not played the game.

On March 11, 2020, Pollack was announced as one of the newest members of the College Football Hall of Fame. He was announced live on air by his College Gameday colleague, Rece Davis. On June 30, 2023, Pollack was laid off by ESPN.

In the 2025 College Football Season Pollack launched his YouTube show and Pod: See Ball. Get Ball. - sharing his take on the country's leading college players, coaches and playoffs. He is often a guest analyst on leading sports from his home studio. In 2025 Pollack also embarked on his keynote speaking career addressing corporate and faith based organizations with actionable takeaways to reach personal and professional goals. He is known for topics from resillience,

Pollack's commitment to healthy living inspired him to start a nutrition supplements line under his favorite phrase, Every Day Counts Nutrition with partnerships that support non-profits. He is also an owner of Thrive Nutrition in Winder, GA.

== Personal life ==
Pollack is a Christian. Pollack is married to his high school sweetheart Lindsey Hopkins Pollack with one son and one daughter. He is active as a coach in the children's lives and member of their local church.

David and Lindsey Pollack created The Pollack Family Foundation, an organization with a vision of providing individuals and communities with opportunities to embrace healthy living through eating well and physical activity.“

The Pollack Family Foundation expanded in 2024 to provide immediate needs to families facing hunger or unhoused, hosting a Banquet of Blessings in Athens' Classic Center to feed and clothe over 1,600 individuals. The Foundation is supported by donors and the family and quietly provides assistance to families in Athens area and Children's Hospital of Atlanta.
