= St. Thomas Aquinas High School (Florida) =

Private, Catholic, college-preparatory high school in Fort Lauderdale, Florida

Location
- 2801 Southwest 12th Street; Fort Lauderdale, Florida 33312; United States; 26°6′28″N 80°10′49″W

Information
- Type: Private
- Motto: Vita ∙ Deo ∙ Veritas (Life ∙ God ∙ Truth)
- Denomination: Catholic
- Patron saint: St. Thomas Aquinas
- Established: 1936
- Oversight: Archdiocese of Miami
- Dean: Robert Biasotti
- Principal: Denise Aloma
- Supervising Principal: Vincent T. Kelly
- Faculty: 130
- Grades: 9–12
- Gender: Coeducational
- Enrollment: 2,420 (2023)
- Student to teacher ratio: 17:1
- Campus size: 25 acres (10 ha)
- Campus type: Urban
- Colors: Blue and Gold
- Mascot: Raider Male
- Nickname: Saint Tommy's
- Team name: Raiders
- Accreditation: Blue Ribbon 2022; Southern Association of Colleges and Schools
- Test average: SAT (Class of 2019): 616.7 Language; 603.9 Mathematics
- Publication: Spectrum (Literary Magazine)
- Newspaper: Raider Review www.raiderreview.org
- Yearbook: Veritas
- Tuition: $16,500 $10,200 for students and families participating and contributing in a Catholic Parish
- Website: aquinas-sta.org

St. Thomas Aquinas High School is a private, Catholic, college-preparatory high school in Fort Lauderdale, Florida, United States. The school was founded in 1936 as part of St. Anthony School and moved to its current location in southwest Fort Lauderdale in 1952. It is sponsored by the Archdiocese of Miami and accredited by the Southern Association of Colleges and Schools. The school currently enrolls 2,420 students on its 25-acre (100,000 m^{2}) campus.

The Raiders athletic teams have won over 100 state championships and have achieved a national profile. Graduates of St. Thomas Aquinas include numerous professional athletes, thirteen Olympians, prominent state politicians, and award-winning authors and actors.

== History ==
St. Anthony High School was founded by the Dominican Sisters of Adrian, Michigan, in 1926. The upper school was added in 1936 and grew to a student body of 42 in four years, boasting nine graduates who comprised the class of 1940.

The upper school was renamed Central Catholic High School and moved to its present location in 1952. The original Central Catholic campus consisted of the main office wing, library, 15 classrooms, patio, cafeteria, kitchen, coaches’ office, and locker room facilities. The school erected a statue of Mary in 1957 that still graces the campus today.

In September 1961, due to the opening of Cardinal Gibbons High School, a second Catholic school in Fort Lauderdale, the school chose St. Thomas Aquinas as its patron and official name.

== Academics ==
On October 3, 2022, for the third time in its history, Broward’s oldest Catholic high school was designated a Blue Ribbon School by the U.S. Department of Education. This 2022 award — as an Exemplary High Performing School — adds to the ones St. Thomas won in 1984 and 1996. Winning schools must wait five years before applying for another award.

On May 29, 1996, President Bill Clinton presented St. Thomas Aquinas High School with the Department of Education Blue Ribbon Award for excellence in education. This was the second time where St. Thomas Aquinas received recognition by the U.S. Department of Education. During the 1984-1985 school year, the school was first recognized as a "School of Excellence".

St. Thomas Aquinas High School has been named to the Catholic High School Honor Roll five times (2004, 2005, 2006, 2007 and 2010). It is the only Catholic high school in the Archdiocese of Miami to have been listed as one of the Top 50 Catholic high schools in the United States for five years.

=== Admissions ===
St. Thomas Aquinas accepts students from 105 feeder schools, 46 Catholic parishes, and three counties. An entrance exam is required for all incoming Freshmen. Prospective students must submit their first semester 8th grade report card and two letters of recommendation from their current school. Prospective transfer students must submit an application along with a copy of their current high school transcript and two academic letters of recommendation from current school officials.

=== Faculty and curriculum ===
The St. Thomas Aquinas faculty consists of three religious and 127 laypersons, with 74 teachers holding advanced degrees. The ratio of students to teaching faculty stands at 17 to 1. The faculty averages 20 years of teaching experience and 12 years of experience at the school.

The school offers 195 different courses in nine subjects: English, mathematics, physical education, science, social studies, foreign language, fine arts, computer/graphic arts, and theology. Students are grouped by ability with course offerings at Advanced Placement, honors, and college-preparatory levels.

== Athletics ==
In 2005, St. Thomas Aquinas was recognized by Sports Illustrated as the third best high school athletic program in the nation. The criteria emphasized all-around excellence during the last 10 years and included state championships won and the number of college athletes produced.

In 2011, St. Thomas Aquinas was named the nation's top athletic program by Maxpreps.

The Raiders have won 115 FHSAA state championships and have graduated such student athletes as Chris Evert, Michael Irvin and Sanya Richards-Ross. The school has been awarded the Broward County all-sports trophy by the Sun-Sentinel for 35 consecutive years. The athletic department has also won the FHSAA Dodge Sunshine Cup every year since the awards inception in 1995.

=== State championships ===
==== Boys ====
- Baseball - 1995, 2003, 2018, 2025
- Basketball - 2001, 2025, 2026
- Cross Country - 2013, 2015, 2016
- Football - 1992, 1997, 1999, 2007, 2008, 2010, 2012, 2014, 2015, 2016, 2019, 2020, 2021, 2022, 2023, 2024, 2025, 2026
- Lacrosse - 2016, 2017, 2022, 2025
- Soccer - 1996, 1997, 1998, 2005, 2011
- Swimming - 1993, 1997, 1998, 1999, 2000, 2001, 2002, 2003, 2004
- Tennis - 1989, 1994, 2009
- Track and Field - 2008, 2009, 2010, 2011, 2012, 2014
- Water Polo - 2013, 2023
- Wrestling - 1985

==== Girls ====
- Basketball - 2021, 2022, 2023, 2024, 2026
- Cross Country - 2012, 2013
- Golf - 1982, 1983, 1984, 1985, 2001
- Lacrosse - 2021
- Soccer - 1990, 1993, 1994, 1995, 1996, 1997, 1998, 1999, 2004, 2005, 2011, 2012, 2014, 2015, 2017
- Softball - 1986, 1993, 2002, 2003, 2013, 2014
- Swimming - 1994, 1995, 1996, 1997, 1998, 1999, 2000, 2001, 2002, 2004
- Tennis - 1972, 1985, 1986, 1993, 1994, 1995, 1996, 2003, 2004, 2007, 2008, 2022
- Track and Field - 1998, 1999, 2000, 2001, 2002, 2003, 2004, 2005, 2013, 2014, 2015, 2018, 2019, 2021
- Volleyball - 1995, 2004, 2014, 2015, 2016, 2018, 2023, 2024

== Notable alumni ==
=== Athletics ===
- Foluke Akinradewo (2005), former professional volleyball player and gold medalist at 2020 Summer Olympics
- Damon Arnette (2015), professional football player
- Carlos Asuaje (2010), former professional baseball player
- Geno Atkins (2006), former professional football player and 8-time Pro Bowler
- Jordan Battle (2019), professional football player for the Cincinnati Bengals
- Alejandro Bedoya, professional soccer player for Philadelphia Union & formerly the US national team
- Giovani Bernard (2010), former professional football player for Tampa Bay Buccaneers
- Nik Bonitto (2018), professional football player for Denver Broncos
- Joey Bosa (2013), professional football player and 3-time Pro Bowler for Los Angeles Chargers
- Nick Bosa (2016), professional football player and Pro Bowler for San Francisco 49ers
- Bobby Brown (1995), former professional football player
- Camden Brown (2022), professional football player for Dallas Cowboys
- Curt Brown, former professional baseball player
- Jeremy Cain (1999), former professional football player
- Stephen Cardullo (2006), former professional baseball player for Colorado Rockies
- Duron Carter (2009), professional football player
- Joe Castiglione, athletic director at University of Oklahoma
- Audra Cohen (2004), former professional tennis player and 2007 NCAA women's singles champion
- John Congemi (1982), former professional football player and college football analyst for ESPN
- Bryan Cox Jr. (2012), professional football player for the Toronto Argonauts
- James Crawford (2013), former professional football player
- Andrew Datko (2008), former professional football player for the Green Bay Packers
- Jaden Davis (2019), professional football player
- Marco Dawson, professional golfer and winner of 2015 Senior British Open
- Phillip Dorsett (2011), professional football player for the Houston Texans and Super Bowl champion
- Jason Dufner, professional golfer and winner of 2013 PGA Championship
- Eric Eichmann, former professional soccer player and member of U.S. Men's National Team at 1990 FIFA World Cup
- Kendall Ellis (2014), Olympian and gold medalist in 4×400m relay at 2020 Summer Olympics
- Chris Evert, former professional tennis player and member of International Tennis Hall of Fame
- Jeanne Evert, former professional tennis player
- OJ Frederique Jr. (2024), college football cornerback for the Miami Hurricanes
- Sean Gallagher (2004), former professional baseball player
- Marcus Gilbert (2006), former professional football player
- Tavares Gooden (2003), former professional football player
- Richard Goodman (2005), former professional football player
- Rashad Greene (2011), former professional football player
- Tyler Greene (2002), former professional baseball player
- Trevon Grimes (2017), former professional football player
- Arman Hall, Olympian and gold medalist in 4×400m relay at 2016 Summer Olympics
- Anthony Hankerson (2022), college football running back
- Leonard Hankerson (2007), former professional football player and wide receivers coach for San Francisco 49ers
- Mike Harley Jr. (2017), professional football player for Cleveland Browns
- Bobby Hart (2011), former professional football player
- Gabe Holmes (2009), former professional football player
- Stefan Humphries, former professional football player and Super Bowl champion
- Michael Irvin, former professional football player and member of Pro Football Hall of Fame
- Lamarcus Joyner (2010), professional football player for New York Jets
- Branden Ledbetter (2004), former professional football player
- Sarah Lihan, Olympian who placed 9th in women's sailing 470 at 2012 Summer Olympics
- Brandon Linder (2010), professional football player for Jacksonville Jaguars
- Madre London (2014), professional football player for the Pittsburgh Maulers
- King Mack (2023), college football safety for the NC State Wolfpack
- Mark Merklein, former professional tennis player and 1994 NCAA men's singles champion
- Gene Monahan, former head athletic trainer for New York Yankees
- Elijah Moore (2018), professional football player for the Cleveland Browns
- Chad Mottola, former professional baseball player and hitting coach for the Tampa Bay Rays
- Ed Nelson (2001), former professional basketball player
- Kirsten Nieuwendam, Olympian who competed in 400m Hurdles at 2008 Summer Olympics and 2012 Summer Olympics
- Kirk Olivadotti (1992), assistant coach for Green Bay Packers
- Michael Palardy (2010), professional football player for Miami Dolphins
- Josh Palmer (2017), professional football player for the Los Angeles Chargers
- Sterling Palmer, former professional football player
- Brian Piccolo, former professional football player, inspiration for film Brian's Song
- Vladislav Polyakov, Olympian and gold medalist in 200m Breaststroke at 2006 FINA World Championships
- Daryl Porter, former professional football player
- Wyatt Ray (2015), former professional football player
- Sanya Richards-Ross, Olympian and gold medalist in women's 400m at 2012 Summer Olympics
- Shawn Riggans (1998), former professional baseball player
- Cody Riggs (2010), former professional football player
- Marcus Roberson (2011), former professional football player
- Nicholas Rodriguez (2024), college football linebacker for the Missouri Tigers
- Marcus Rosemy-Jacksaint (2020), college football wide receiver for the Georgia Bulldogs
- Jake Rudock (2011), former professional football player
- Twan Russell, former professional football player and director of Youth and Community Programs for Miami Dolphins
- Nate Salley (2002), former professional football player
- Asante Samuel Jr. (2018), professional football player for the Los Angeles Chargers
- Tony Sands, former professional football player
- Tyreak Sapp (2021), college football defensive end for the Florida Gators
- Jordan Scarlett (2015), former professional football player
- Robby Scott (2007), professional baseball player for Arizona Diamondbacks
- Dezmen Southward (2009), former professional football player
- Khalifa St. Fort, Olympian and gold medalist in 4×100m relay at 2015 World Championships
- Mike Stanley, former professional baseball player and 1995 American League All-Star
- Tyler Steen (2018), NFL Football Player, Philadelphia Eagles
- Seilala Sua, Olympian who placed 10th in discus at 2000 Summer Olympics
- Brett Swenson (2006), former professional football player
- Christian Thompson (2008), former professional football player
- India Trotter, former professional soccer player and member of U.S. Women's National Team
- Dallas Turner (2021), professional football player for the Minnesota Vikings
- James White (2010), former professional football player for New England Patriots and 3-time Super Bowl champion
- Major Wright (2007), former professional football player
- Ed Yarnall, former professional baseball player
- Sam Young (2006), former professional football player

=== Arts, entertainment, and civil service ===
- Gabriel Perez Silva, fashion photographer and Forbes 30 Under 30 honoree (class of 2015)
- Alex Andrade, member of Florida House of Representatives
- Michael Connelly, author of The Lincoln Lawyer and former President of Mystery Writers of America
- Steven Conrad, screenwriter and producer of The Weather Man, The Secret Life of Walter Mitty, and The Pursuit of Happyness
- Billy Crudup, actor Tony Award and Emmy Award winner
- Katie Edwards, former member of Florida House of Representatives
- Parris Glendening, former governor of Maryland
- Charles Liteky, former Army chaplain and Medal of Honor recipient
- Courtney Marsh, filmmaker of Academy Award-nominated documentary Chau, Beyond the Lines
- Alberto Rosende, actor and singer who appeared in the Freeform supernatural drama Shadowhunters
- C. Dale Young, poet and recipient of 2012 Guggenheim Fellowship
- William J. Zloch, U.S. District Court Judge for the Southern District of Florida

=== Other ===
- Gerard John Schaefer, murderer and suspected serial killer, known as "the Killer Cop"
