= Bobby Brown (wide receiver) =

American football player (born 1977)

No. 89
- Position: Wide receiver

Personal information
- Born: March 26, 1977 (age 49); Fort Lauderdale, Florida, U.S.
- Listed height: 6 ft 2 in (1.88 m)
- Listed weight: 197 lb (89 kg)

Career information
- High school: St. Thomas Aquinas (Fort Lauderdale)
- College: Notre Dame (1995–1999)
- NFL draft: 2000: undrafted

Career history
- Green Bay Packers (2000)*; Cleveland Browns (2000–2001)
- * Offseason or practice squad member only

Career NFL statistics
- Receptions: 2
- Receiving yards: 14
- Average: 7
- Touchdowns: 0
- Stats at Pro Football Reference

Braynard Ontawyn Brown (born March 26, 1977) is an American former professional football player who was a wide receiver for one season with the Cleveland Browns of the National Football League (NFL). He played college football for the Notre Dame Fighting Irish.

== Early life ==
Braynard Ontawyn Brown was born March 26, 1977, in Fort Lauderdale, Florida. He attended St. Thomas Aquinas High School in Fort Lauderdale, Florida.

== College career ==
Brown was a member of the Notre Dame Fighting Irish of the University of Notre Dame from 1995 to 1999. He was redshirted in 1995. He caught two passes for 84 yards in 1996, 45 passes for 543 yards and six touchdowns in 1997, 13 passes for 286 yards and one touchdown in 1998, and 36 passes for 608 yards and five touchdowns in 1999. He also participated in track at Notre Dame. He graduated with a triple major in government, sociology and computer application with a minor in African-American studies.

== Professional career ==
After going undrafted in the 2000 NFL draft, Brown signed with the Green Bay Packers on April 20, 2000. He was later released on August 27, 2000.

Brown was signed to the practice squad of the Cleveland Browns on August 29, 2000. He was promoted to the active roster on November 11 and played in six games for the Browns during the 2000 season, recording two receptions for 14 yards on seven targets. He also posted one solo tackle. He was released the next year on August 29, 2001. Brown was later signed to the Browns' practice squad on December 12, 2001. He became a free agent after the season.

== Personal life ==
After his NFL career, Brown graduated from Notre Dame Law School with a Juris Doctor and from the Yale School of Management with a Master of Business Administration. He has worked as a corporate attorney and in the financial services industry. He has also served as a Councilman for South Orange, New Jersey.

Browns is a member of Omega Psi Phi. His nephew, Cody Riggs, also played in the NFL.
