= Brandon Linder =

American football player (born 1992)

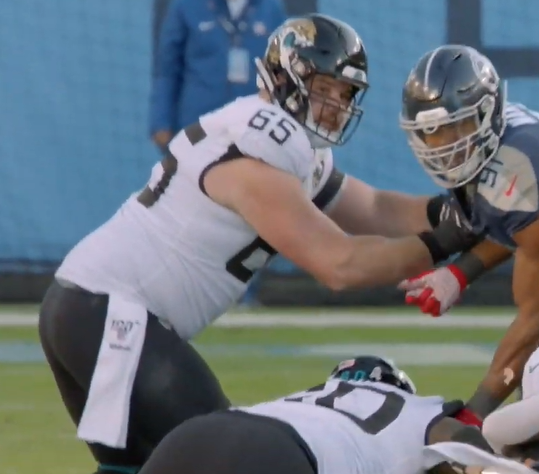
- Linder with the Jacksonville Jaguars in 2019

No. 65
- Position: Center

Personal information
- Born: January 25, 1992 (age 34); Southwest Ranches, Florida, U.S.
- Listed height: 6 ft 6 in (1.98 m)
- Listed weight: 315 lb (143 kg)

Career information
- High school: St. Thomas Aquinas (Fort Lauderdale, Florida)
- College: Miami (FL)
- NFL draft: 2014: 3rd round, 93rd overall pick

Career history
- Jacksonville Jaguars (2014–2021)

Awards and highlights
- Second-team All-ACC (2013)

Career NFL statistics
- Games played: 88
- Games started: 88
- Stats at Pro Football Reference

Brandon Linder (born January 25, 1992) is an American former professional football player who was a center for eight seasons in the National Football League (NFL). He was selected by the Jacksonville Jaguars in the third round of the 2014 NFL draft. He played college football at the University of Miami.

== Professional career ==
Pre-draft measurables
Height	Weight	Arm length	Hand span	40-yard dash	10-yard split	20-yard split	20-yard shuttle	Three-cone drill	Vertical jump	Broad jump	Bench press
6 ft 5 5/8 in (1.97 m)	311 lb (141 kg)	34 1/2 in (0.88 m)	10 1/4 in (0.26 m)	5.35 s	1.88 s	3.11 s	4.71 s	7.77 s	26.5 in (0.67 m)	8 ft 4 in (2.54 m)	30 reps
All values from NFL Combine/Pro Day

Linder was selected by the Jacksonville Jaguars in the third round, 93rd overall, of the 2014 NFL draft. He was selected to Pro Football Focus (PFF)'s Pro Bowl team as a reserve his rookie year after starting 15 games at guard.

On October 5, 2015, he was placed on injured reserve with a shoulder injury after starting three games.

In 2016, the Jaguars moved Linder to center, where he started 14 games. Linder performed exceptionally at the center position, with PFF ranking him as the 3rd best center that year.

On July 25, 2017, Linder signed a five-year, $51.7 million extension with the Jaguars, making him the highest paid center in league history.

Linder started 13 games at center for the Jaguars in 2017, missing three games due to an illness.

In 2018, Linder started the first nine games at center before suffering a season-ending knee injury in Week 10. He was placed on injured reserve on November 13, 2018.

In 2020, Linder missed four games due to injury before being placed on injured reserve on December 16, 2020, with an ankle injury.

On October 12, 2021, Linder was placed on injured reserve after suffering MCL and ankle injuries in Week 5. He was activated on November 27.

Linder announced his retirement on March 28, 2022.
