= 2004 All-SEC football team =

American college football all-star team

The 2004 All-SEC football team consists of American football players selected to the All-Southeastern Conference (SEC) chosen by the Associated Press (AP) and the conference coaches for the 2004 NCAA Division I-A football season.

The Auburn Tigers won the conference, beating the Tennessee Volunteers 38 to 28 in the SEC Championship Game. Despite finishing the season undefeated, the Tigers were not invited to the National Championship Game, and won the Sugar Bowl over the Virginia Tech Hokies 16 to 13.

Auburn quarterback Jason Campbell was voted AP SEC Offensive Player of the Year. Georgia defensive end David Pollack, a unanimous AP selection, was voted AP SEC Defensive Player of the Year.

== Offensive selections ==
=== Quarterbacks ===
- Jason Campbell, Auburn (AP-1, Coaches-1)
- Chris Leak, Florida (AP-2)
- Matt Jones, Arkansas (Coaches-2)
- David Greene, Georgia (Coaches-2)

=== Running backs ===
- Carnell Williams, Auburn (AP-1, Coaches-1)
- Ciatrick Fason, Florida (AP-1, Coaches-2)
- Ronnie Brown, Auburn (AP-2, Coaches-1)
- Kenneth Darby, Alabama (AP-2)
- Cedric Houston, Tennessee (Coaches-2)
- Jerious Norwood, Miss. St. (Coaches-2)

=== Wide receivers ===
- Reggie Brown, Georgia (AP-1, Coaches-1)
- Troy Williamson, South Carolina (AP-1, Coaches-2)
- Fred Gibson, Georgia (AP-2, Coaches-1)
- O. J. Small, Florida (AP-2, Coaches-2)

=== Centers ===
- Ben Wilkerson, LSU (AP-1, Coaches-1)
- Mike Degory, Florida (AP-2, Coaches-2)

=== Guards ===
- Max Jean-Gilles, Georgia (AP-2, Coaches-1)
- Evan Mathis, Alabama (AP-1, Coaches-2)
- Mo Mitchell, Florida (AP-2, Coaches-2)
- Tim Duckworth, Auburn (Coaches-2)
- Doug Buckles, Ole Miss (Coaches-2)
- Danny Lindsay, Auburn (Coaches-2)

=== Tackles ===
- Marcus McNeill, Auburn (AP-1, Coaches-1)
- Michael Muñoz, Tennessee (AP-1, Coaches-2)
- Andrew Whitworth, LSU (AP-2, Coaches-1)
- Wesley Britt*, Alabama (AP-1)
- Marcus Johnson, Ole Miss (AP-2)
- Justin Geisinger, Vanderbilt (Coaches-2)

=== Tight ends ===
- Leonard Pope, Georgia (AP-1, Coaches-1)
- David Jones, LSU (AP-2, Coaches-2)
- Cooper Wallace, Auburn (AP-2)

== Defensive selections ==
=== Defensive ends ===
- David Pollack*, Georgia (AP-1, Coaches-1)
- Marcus Spears*, LSU (AP-1, Coaches-1)
- Jeb Huckeba, Arkansas (Coaches-1)
- Parys Haralson, Tennessee (AP-2)
- Willie Evans, Miss. St. (AP-2)

=== Defensive tackles ===
- Jesse Mahelona, Tennessee (AP-1, Coaches-2)
- Ronald Fields, Miss. St. (AP-1)
- Tommy Jackson, Auburn (AP-1)
- Kyle Williams, LSU (AP-2)
- Claude Wroten, LSU (Coaches-2)
- McKinley Boykin, Ole Miss (Coaches-2)
- Stanley McClover, Auburn (Coaches-2)

=== Linebackers ===
- Kevin Burnett, Tennessee (AP-1, Coaches-1)
- Cornelius Wortham, Alabama (AP-1, Coaches-1)
- Moses Osemwegie, Vanderbilt (AP-1, Coaches-1)
- Channing Crowder, Florida (AP-2, Coaches-1)
- Odell Thurman, Georgia (AP-2, Coaches-1)
- Lionel Turner, LSU (AP-2, Coaches-1)
- Travis Williams, Auburn (AP-2)
- Omar Gaither, Tennessee (Coaches-2)
- DeMeco Ryans, Alabama (Coaches-2)
- Freddie Roach, Alabama (Coaches-2)
- Earl Everett, Florida (Coaches-2)

=== Cornerbacks ===
- Carlos Rogers, Auburn (AP-1, Coaches-1)
- Corey Webster, LSU (AP-1, Coaches-2)
- Jason Allen, Tennessee (Coaches-1)

=== Safeties ===
- Thomas Davis Sr., Georgia (AP-1, Coaches-1)
- Junior Rosegreen, Auburn (AP-1, Coaches-1)
- Ko Simpson, South Carolina (Coaches-2)
- LaRon Landry, LSU (Coaches-2)
- Roman Harper, Alabama (Coaches-2)
- Muhammed Abdullah, Kentucky (Coaches-2)

== Special teams ==
=== Kickers ===
- Bryan Bostick, Alabama (AP-1, Coaches-1)
- Jonathan Nichols, Ole Miss (Coaches-2)

=== Punters ===
- Jared Cook, Miss. St. (AP-1, Coaches-1)
- Dustin Colquitt, Tennessee (AP-2, Coaches-2)

=== All purpose/return specialist ===
- Carnell Williams, Auburn (AP-1, Coaches-1)
- Tyrone Prothro, Alabama (Coaches-2)

== Key ==
Bold = Consensus first-team selection by both the coaches and AP

AP = Associated Press.

Coaches = Selected by the SEC coaches

* = Unanimous selection of AP

== See also ==
- 2004 College Football All-America Team
