= Gerald Riggs Jr. =

American gridiron football player (born 1983)

No. 21
- Position: Running back

Personal information
- Born: September 28, 1983 (age 43); Atlanta, Georgia, U.S.
- Listed height: 6 ft 0 in (1.83 m)
- Listed weight: 230 lb (104 kg)

Career information
- College: Tennessee

Career history
- 2006: Miami Dolphins*
- 2007: Chicago Bears*
- 2007: Rhein Fire
- 2011–2013: Toronto Argonauts
- * Offseason or practice squad member only

Awards and highlights
- Grey Cup champion (2012)
- Stats at CFL.ca

Gerald Antonio Riggs Jr. (born September 28, 1983) is an American former professional football running back. He played college football at Tennessee. He is the son of former Pro Bowl running back Gerald and ex-wife Dana Riggs.

== Early life ==
Riggs attended Red Bank High School in Red Bank, Tennessee. He helped lead the team to an undefeated season, 15–0, and the school's first state championship in football during the 2000 season. Riggs also won the Tennessee Mr. Football trophy that season. He played in the 2002 U.S. Army All-American Bowl.

== College career ==
Riggs contributed to the Volunteers' back field from 2002 to 2005. Riggs, along with Cedric Houston, was one of two different 1,000 plus yard rushers for Tennessee in the 2004 season. This was the first time in Tennessee football history to have multiple 1,000 yard rushers in a season. Riggs was a preseason All-American and Heisman Trophy candidate in 2005, but a lower leg injury ended his senior season. Riggs finished with over 2,000 all-purpose yards and 18 touchdown despite injuries early in career that kept him off the field.

== Professional career ==
=== Miami Dolphins ===
Riggs entered the 2006 NFL draft, but was not selected, partly due to concerns about his injury status. After the draft, Riggs signed a free agent contract with the Miami Dolphins. He was released by the team on September 2, re-signed to the practice squad on September 3 and then released again on September 5. He spent the season out of football.

=== Chicago Bears ===
Riggs was signed by the Chicago Bears on February 2, 2007. He was assigned to the Rhein Fire of NFL Europa during the offseason. The Bears released him on May 23.

=== Detroit Lions ===
Riggs worked out at a Detroit Lions minicamp in May 2009 but was not signed.

=== Toronto Argonauts ===
On May 31, 2011, Riggs signed with the Toronto Argonauts of the Canadian Football League. Riggs received 35 rushing attempts during the 2012 CFL season, amassing 220 yards and one touchdown. On June 22, 2013, Riggs was released by the Argos.

== Personal life ==
His father, Gerald Riggs, was a three-time Pro Bowl running back for the Atlanta Falcons and Washington Redskins. His brother, Cody Riggs, played cornerback for the Notre Dame Fighting Irish in college and signed as an undrafted free agent with the Tennessee Titans in 2015.
