= 2003 All-SEC football team =

American college football all-star team

The 2003 All-SEC football team consists of American football players selected to the All-Southeastern Conference (SEC) chosen by the Associated Press (AP) and the conference coaches for the 2003 NCAA Division I-A football season.

The LSU Tigers won the conference, beating the Georgia Bulldogs 34 to 13 in the SEC Championship game. The Tigers then won a national championship, defeating the Big 12 champion Oklahoma Sooners 21 to 14 in the BCS National Championship Game.

Ole Miss quarterback Eli Manning was voted SEC Offensive Player of the Year by both AP and Coaches. LSU defensive tackle Chad Lavalais was voted the coaches SEC Defensive Player of the Year; Florida cornerback Keiwan Ratliff was the AP's choice.

== Offensive selections ==
=== Quarterbacks ===
- Eli Manning, Ole Miss (AP-1, Coaches-1)
- Matt Mauck, LSU (AP-2, Coaches-2)
- David Greene, Georgia (Coaches-2)

=== Running backs ===
- Carnell Williams#, Auburn (AP-1, Coaches-1)
- Cedric Cobbs, Arkansas (AP-1, Coaches-1)
- Shaud Williams, Alabama (AP-2, Coaches-2)
- Nick Turner, Miss. St. (AP-2)
- Cedric Houston, Tennessee (Coaches-2)

=== Wide receivers ===
- Michael Clayton, LSU (AP-1, Coaches-1)
- Chris Collins, Ole Miss (AP-1, Coaches-1)
- Devery Henderson, LSU (AP-2, Coaches-1)
- Justin Jenkins, Miss. St. (AP-2, Coaches-2)
- George Wilson, Arkansas (AP-2)

=== Centers ===
- Scott Wells, Tennessee (AP-2, Coaches-1)
- Bill Wilkerson, LSU (AP-1)
- Mike Degory, Florida (Coaches-2)

=== Guards ===
- Stephen Peterman, LSU (AP-1, Coaches-2)
- Monreko Crittenden, Auburn (AP-1)
- Travelle Wharton, South Carolina (AP-2)
- Justin Smiley, Alabama (AP-2)
- Max Jean-Gilles, Georgia (Coaches-2)

=== Tackles ===
- Shawn Andrews#, Arkansas (AP-1, Coaches-1)
- Antonio Hall, Kentucky (AP-1, Coaches-1)
- Wesley Britt, Alabama (AP-2, Coaches-1)
- Max Starks, Florida (AP-1)
- Michael Muñoz, Tennessee (Coaches-2)

=== Tight ends ===
- Ben Troupe, Florida (AP-1, Coaches-1)
- Ben Watson, Georgia (AP-2)
- Jason Peters, Arkansas (Coaches-2)

== Defensive selections ==
=== Defensive ends ===
- David Pollack, Georgia (AP-1, Coaches-1)
- Marcus Spears, LSU (AP-1)
- Antwan Odom, Alabama (Coaches-1)
- Bobby McCray, Florida (AP-2, Coaches-2)
- Reggie Torbor, Auburn (AP-2, Coaches-2)
- Vincent Burns, Kentucky (Coaches-2)

=== Defensive tackles ===
- Chad Lavalais, LSU (AP-1, Coaches-1)
- Jesse Mitchell, Ole Miss (AP-1)
- DeMarco McNeil, Auburn (AP-1)
- Jovan Haye, Vanderbilt (Coaches-2)

=== Linebackers ===
- Karlos Dansby#, Auburn (AP-1, Coaches-1)
- Odell Thurman, Georgia (AP-1, Coaches-1)
- Channing Crowder, Florida (AP-1, Coaches-2)
- Derrick Pope, Alabama (AP-1)
- Dontarrious Thomas, Auburn (AP-1)
- Caleb Miller, Arkansas (AP-2, Coaches-2)
- Kevin Simon, Tennessee (AP-2, Coaches-2)
- DeMeco Ryans, Alabama (AP-2)
- Kevin Burnett, Tennessee (Coaches-2)

=== Cornerbacks ===
- Keiwan Ratliff, Florida (AP-1, Coaches-1)
- Corey Webster, LSU (AP-1, Coaches-1)
- Ahmad Carroll, Arkansas (Coaches-1)

=== Safeties ===
- Sean Jones, Georgia (AP-1, Coaches-1)
- Thomas Davis Sr., Georgia (AP-1, Coaches-2)
- Tony Bua, Arkansas (AP-2, Coaches-1)
- Gibril Wilson, Tennessee (AP-2, Coaches-2)
- Rashad Baker, Tennessee (AP-2)
- Guss Scott, Florida (AP-2)
- LaRon Landry, LSU (AP-2)
- Daryl Dixon, Florida (Coaches-2)
- Muhammed Abdullah, Kentucky (Coaches-2)

== Special teams ==
=== Kickers ===
- Jonathan Nichols, Ole Miss (AP-1, Coaches-1)
- Billy Bennett, Georgia (AP-2, Coaches-2)

=== Punters ===
- Dustin Colquitt#, Tennessee (AP-1, Coaches-1)
- Eric Wilbur, Florida (AP-2)
- Cody Ridgeway, Ole Miss (Coaches-2)

=== All purpose/return specialist ===
- Derek Abney, Kentucky (AP-1, Coaches-1)
- Skyler Green, LSU (AP-2)

== Key ==
Bold = Consensus first-team selection by both the coaches and AP

AP = Associated Press.

Coaches = Selected by the SEC coaches

* = Unanimous selection of AP

# = Unanimous selection of coaches

== See also ==
- 2003 College Football All-America Team
