= Marcus Roberson =

American football player (born 1992)

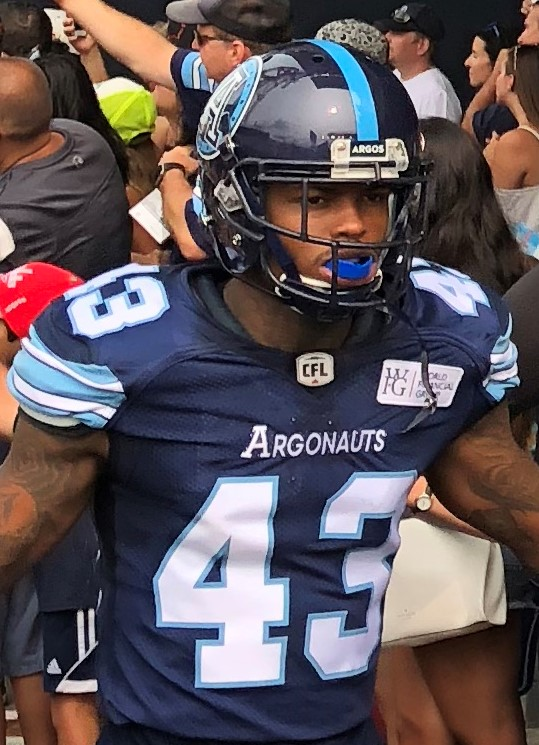
- Roberson with the Toronto Argonauts in 2018

No. 47, 39
- Position: Defensive back

Personal information
- Born: October 4, 1992 (age 34); Fort Lauderdale, Florida, U.S.
- Listed height: 6 ft 0 in (1.83 m)
- Listed weight: 191 lb (87 kg)

Career information
- High school: Aquinas (Fort Lauderdale)
- College: Florida
- NFL draft: 2014: undrafted

Career history
- St. Louis Rams (2014–2015); Buffalo Bills (2016); Houston Texans (2017)*; Toronto Argonauts (2018); Ottawa Redblacks (2020–2021)*
- * Offseason or practice squad member only

Awards and highlights
- Second-team All-SEC (2012)

Career NFL statistics
- Total tackles: 41
- Forced fumbles: 1
- Interceptions: 1
- Stats at Pro Football Reference
- Stats at CFL.ca

Marcus Dwayne Roberson (born October 4, 1992) is an American former professional football player who was a defensive back in the National Football League (NFL) and Canadian Football League (CFL). He played college football for the Florida Gators. He signed with the St. Louis Rams as an undrafted free agent after the 2014 NFL draft.

== Early life ==
Roberson was born in Fort Lauderdale, Florida. He attended St. Thomas Aquinas High School in Fort Lauderdale. As a senior, he helped lead the St. Thomas Aquinas Raiders high school football team to a 15–0 record, a Florida Class 5A state championship, and the No. 3 national ranking in the USA Today Super 25.

Rated as a four-star recruit by Rivals.com, he was ranked as the No. 2 cornerback prospect in the nation. He chose the University of Florida over offers from Auburn, Texas Tech and Southern California.

== College career ==
Roberson accepted an athletic scholarship to attend the University of Florida in Gainesville, Florida, where he played for coach Will Muschamp's Florida Gators football team from 2011 to 2013. As a freshman in 2011, he started the first ten games before suffering a season-ending injury against the South Carolina Gamecocks. He finished his freshman season with 22 tackles, an interception and a fumble recovery. In 2012, he appeared in all 13 games, starting four; he recorded 23 tackles, 18 solo, had two interceptions, 12 pass breakups (which ranked second best in the Southeastern Conference), and a forced fumble. As a junior in 2013, his season was hampered by injuries and he played in only seven games, recording 11 tackles and three pass breakups.

On January 4, 2014, he announced he would forgo his final year of college eligibility and enter the 2014 NFL draft.

== Professional career ==
Pre-draft measurables
Height	Weight	40-yard dash	10-yard split	20-yard split	20-yard shuttle	Three-cone drill	Vertical jump	Broad jump	Bench press	Wonderlic
6 ft 0 in (1.83 m)	191 lb (87 kg)	4.61 s	1.57 s	2.57 s	4.08 s	6.84 s	37 1/2 in (0.95 m)	10 ft 0 in (3.05 m)	8 reps	x

=== St. Louis Rams ===
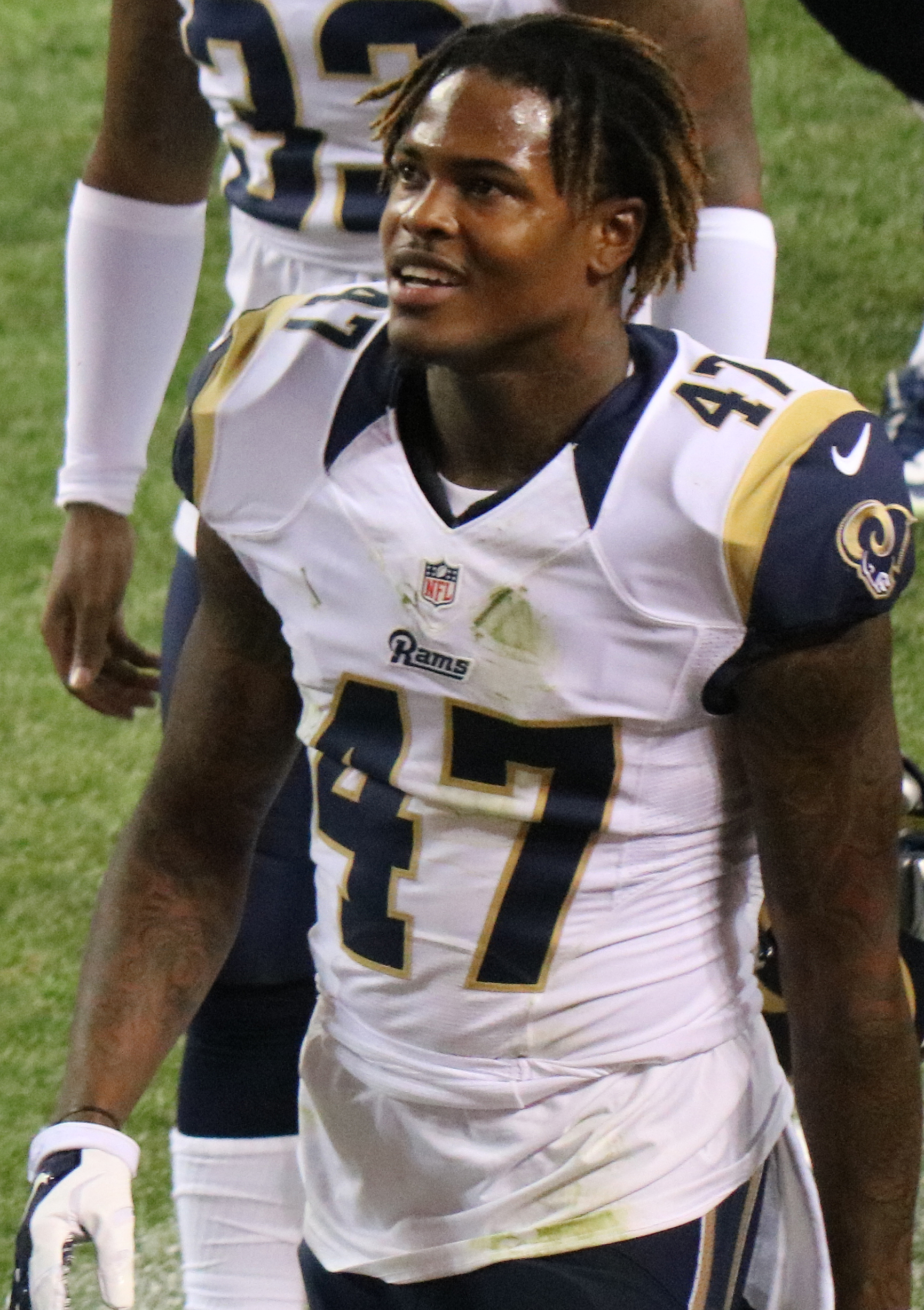
Roberson with the St. Louis Rams in 2016

Roberson signed with St. Louis Rams as an undrafted free agent in 2014. He played in 25 career games with the Rams, accumulating 39 tackles, one interception and seven passes defensed. On September 3, 2016, he was waived by the Rams as part of final roster cuts.

=== Buffalo Bills ===
On September 5, 2016, Roberson was signed to the Buffalo Bills' practice squad. He was promoted to the active roster on October 29, 2016. He was released by the Buffalo Bills on November 2, 2016, and was re-signed to the practice squad two days later. He was promoted back to the active roster on November 14, 2016. On May 11, 2017, he was waived by the Bills.

=== Houston Texans ===
On May 12, 2017, Roberson was claimed off waivers by the Houston Texans. He was waived on September 2, 2017.

=== Ottawa Redblacks ===
After the CFL canceled the 2020 season due to the COVID-19 pandemic, Roberson chose to opt-out of his contract with the Ottawa Redblacks on August 26, 2020. He re-signed with the team on January 15, 2021. He was released on July 29, 2021.

== See also ==
- List of Florida Gators in the NFL draft
