= Michael Muñoz (American football) =

American football player (born 1981)

No. 77
- Position: Offensive tackle

Personal information
- Born: July 31, 1981 (age 45); Cincinnati, Ohio, U.S.
- Listed height: 6 ft 7 in (2.01 m)
- Listed weight: 312 lb (142 kg)

Career information
- High school: Moeller (Cincinnati)
- College: Tennessee (2001−2004)

Awards and highlights
- Draddy Trophy (2004); Consensus All-American (2004); First-team All-SEC (2004); Second-team All-SEC (2003)

Michael Anthony Muñoz Jr. (born July 31, 1981) is a former American college football player. He was a consensus All-American offensive lineman for the Tennessee Volunteers for four seasons during the early 2000s.

== Early life ==
Muñoz was born in Cincinnati, Ohio, the son of Cincinnati Bengals offensive tackle Anthony Muñoz. He attended Moeller High School in Cincinnati, where he was a standout player for the Moeller Crusaders high school football team. He was selected as a member of the USA Today All-USA high school football team in 1999.

His younger sister Michelle, who was a year behind him in school, was named AP Ohio Ms. Basketball in both her junior (1999-2000) and senior (2000-2001) seasons at Mason High School and led the school to the Ohio Div. 1 state championship crown her junior year. She played for the Tennessee Lady Volunteers women's basketball team at the University of Tennessee before transferring to play for the Ohio State Buckeyes women's basketball team at Ohio State University.

== College career ==
Muñoz received an athletic scholarship to attend the University of Tennessee in Knoxville, Tennessee, and was a four-season starter for coach Phillip Fulmer's Tennessee Volunteers football team from 2000 to 2004. He started 12 games as a true freshman in 2000, but missed his entire sophomore season in with a knee injury in 2001. He returned to start 12 games as a redshirt sophomore in 2002, and started 13 games as a team captain during his 2003 junior season.

For the first time in his college career, Muñoz was not forced to undergo surgery during his 2003–04 offseason, allowing him to fully participate in training sessions and workouts that he had often missed during his previous offseasons. As a senior in 2004, he was again chosen as team captain by his teammates, was recognized as a consensus first-team All-American, and received the Draddy Trophy in recognition of his outstanding athletic and academic accomplishments. He was also a second-team All-Southeastern Conference selection in 2003 and 2004. During his four seasons playing for the Volunteers, he started in a total of 46 games.

Following the 2003 season, he graduated from Tennessee with a bachelor's degree in political science and a 3.67 grade point average, and was enrolled in a master's degree program in public administration during his final season.

== Life after football ==
Despite his decorated college football career, Muñoz was not chosen in the 2005 NFL draft, largely because of his history of recurring knee and shoulder injuries. In November 2005, he was elected trustee of Hamilton Township in Warren County, Ohio in his first run for elective office. He subsequently earned a master of business administration degree (M.B.A.) from Miami University in Oxford, Ohio, and now is Vice President of Youth Football & Character Development at the Pro Football Hall of Fame.
