= Cedric Houston =

American football player (born 1982)

No. 34
- Position: Running back

Personal information
- Born: June 28, 1982 (age 44); Little Rock, Arkansas, U.S.
- Listed height: 6 ft 0 in (1.83 m)
- Listed weight: 220 lb (100 kg)

Career information
- High school: Clarendon (Clarendon, Arkansas)
- College: Tennessee
- NFL draft: 2005: 6th round, 182nd overall pick

Career history
- New York Jets (2005–2006)

Awards and highlights
- 2× Second-team All-SEC (2003, 2004)

Career NFL statistics
- Rushing attempts: 194
- Rushing yards: 676
- Rushing touchdowns: 7
- Receptions: 15
- Receiving yards: 109
- Stats at Pro Football Reference

Cedric Leonard Houston (born June 28, 1982) is an American former professional football player who was a running back in the National Football League (NFL). He was selected by the New York Jets in the sixth round of the 2005 NFL draft. He played college football for the Tennessee Volunteers.

== Early life ==
Houston played football, basketball, baseball and track and field while at Clarendon High School in Clarendon, Arkansas. He played in the first ever U.S. Army All-American Bowl on December 30, 2000. He held the Arkansas Activities Association record for career touchdowns with 97 from 2000 to 2022 at Clarendon High.

== College career ==
Houston was a three-year starter at the University of Tennessee. He and Gerald Riggs, Jr. became the first players in Volunteers history to both amass 1,000 yards in the same season in 2004. In the 2004 season, he had three games over the 100-yard mark and two games with multiple touchdowns.

== Professional career ==
=== New York Jets ===
The New York Jets selected Houston using their sixth round pick in the 2005 NFL draft. Houston struggled in training camp as a thyroid condition, discovered at the NFL Combine, caused frequent fatigue issues. He was given medication to treat the condition. Heading into the season, Houston served as backup to Curtis Martin and Derrick Blaylock however, Blaylock suffered a broken right foot in October 2005 thus elevating Houston to second on the depth chart. Martin suffered a knee injury that he played through for 10 weeks before Houston replaced him as the starter on December 11. As a rookie, he finished with 81 carries for 302 yards and two touchdowns in the 2005 season.

Houston was involved in a car crash in April 2006 sustaining non-life-threatening injuries. He was later released from the hospital. In the 2006 season, he had 113 carries for 374 yards and five touchdowns in eight games and one start.

A day before the start of training camp, on July 26, 2007, Houston left the Jets for what was cited as personal reasons. It was later revealed Houston had decided to quit professional football to return to Tennessee to earn his degree. Houston remained on the Jets' reserve list the entire season and was eventually released on March 11, 2008.
