= Bearden High School (Tennessee) =

Location
- 8352 Kingston Pike; Knoxville, Tennessee; United States; 35.9213°N 84.05681°W

Information
- Type: Public High School
- Motto: "A Proud Tradition of Excellence"
- Established: 1939
- School district: Knox County Schools
- Superintendent: Jon Rysewyk
- Principal: Debbie Sayers
- Teaching staff: 114.17 (FTE)
- Grades: 9-12
- Gender: Co-ed
- Enrollment: 2,008 (2023-2024)
- Student to teacher ratio: 17.59
- Hours in school day: 7
- Colors: Maroon, grey, white
- Athletics: Football, basketball, baseball, bowling, cross country, golf, soccer, softball, swimming and diving, tennis, track & field, volleyball, rugby, ice hockey, lacrosse, wrestling, marching band
- Mascot: Bulldogs
- Nickname: Bulldogs
- Rivals: Farragut Admirals, West Rebels, Maryville Red Rebels
- Newspaper: The Bark
- Yearbook: ECHO
- Feeder schools: West Valley, Cedar Bluff, and Bearden Middle
- Affiliations: Public High School
- Website: beardenhs.knoxschools.org

Bearden High School is a Knox County, Tennessee, high school located in the Bearden area in the city of Knoxville.

The school was founded in 1939. It was named for the family of Marcus De LaFayette Bearden, in 1967 and finished in 1969, replacing the old building which eventually became Bearden Elementary School. The current principal is Debbie Sayers, who became Principal in the 2019–2020 school year. Bearden High School athletic teams are dubbed "The Bulldogs." Bearden's rivals are the Farragut Admirals, West Rebels, and Maryville Red Rebels.

== Athletics ==
The school plays football, baseball, women's basketball, track and field, volleyball, men's basketball, soccer, softball, dance, swimming and diving, wrestling, rugby, climbing, and marching band competitively.

== Notable alumni ==
- Nate Adkins, Denver Broncos professional American football player, formerly of University of South Carolina
- Stephen Bassett, professional cyclist of Silber Pro Cycling
- Wes Bailey, keyboardist for Moon Taxi
- Brian Bell, Weezer guitar player
- Tim Burchett, former Tennessee State senator and Knox County mayor and current U.S. Congressman representing the Second District
- Brett Carroll, former MLB player
- Ashley Cleveland, Grammy Award-winning gospel rock singer/songwriter
- Britton Colquitt, Minnesota Vikings professional American football player, formerly of University of Tennessee
- Dustin Colquitt, Pittsburgh Steelers professional American football player, formerly of University of Tennessee, co-founder of TeamSmile
- Dale Dickey, actress known for her role as "Patty the Daytime Hooker" in My Name is Earl
- Mike DiFelice, Major League Baseball catcher
- Phil Garner, former MLB All-Star and manager
- Aaron Hoskins, drummer for The Dirty Guv’nahs
- Justin Hoskins, bassist for The Dirty Guv’nahs
- Dennis Hwang, graphic designer for Google
- Bobby Ogdin, recording session pianist, member of Elvis Presley's TCB Band, the Marshall Tucker Band and Ween
- Nick Raskulinecz, record producer
- Candy Reynolds, professional tennis player
- Aaron Schoenfeld (born 1990), American-Israeli former professional soccer MLS player
- Will Schusterick (born 1992), professional disc golf player
- Lane Thomas (born 1995), MLB player for the Washington Nationals
- Thomas Varlan (born 1956), US federal judge
- Bernie L. Wade, bishop, International Circle of Faith
- Holly Warlick, former University of Tennessee Women's Basketball head coach
- Chris Woodruff, professional tennis player
