= Ruth Kedar =

Brazilian artist and designer

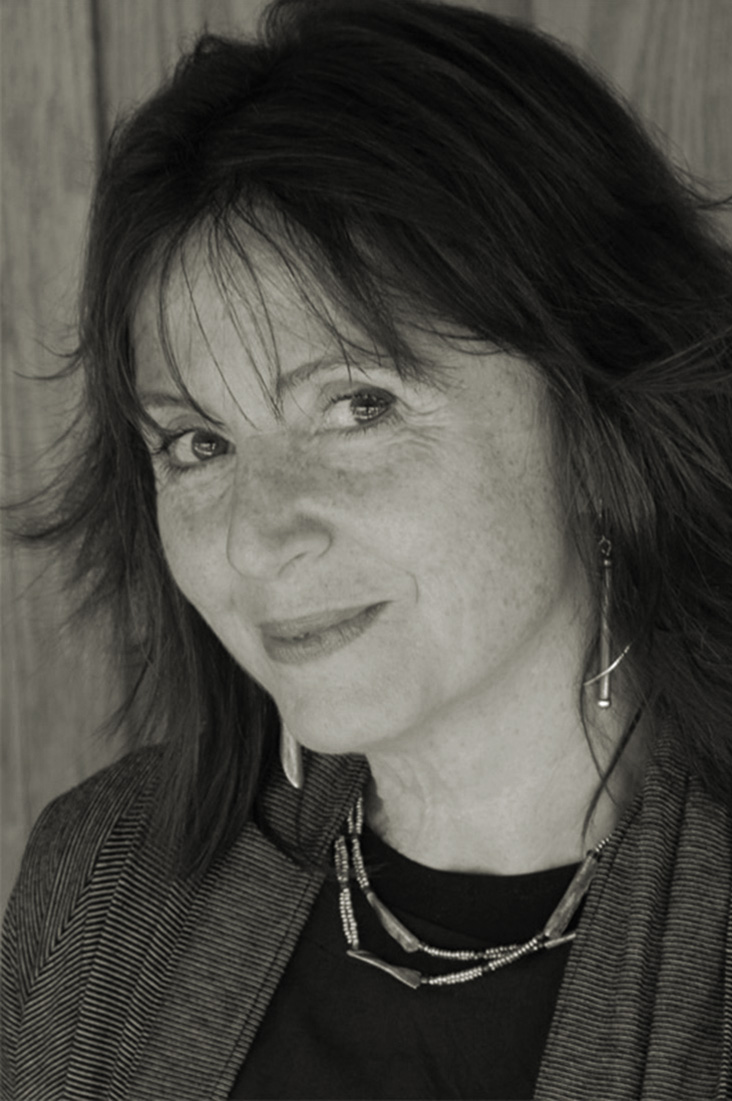
- Born: January 27, 1955 (age 71); Campinas, Brazil
- Education: Technion, Stanford University
- Known for: Graphic design, Art
- Notable work: Google Logo

Ruth Kedar (Hebrew: רות קדר; born 27 January 1955) is a Brazilian-born artist and designer, best known for designing the Google logo that was displayed from May 31, 1999 to September 1, 2015. Larry Page and Sergey Brin were looking at designers to design their logo and website and Kedar was asked to present them with some preliminary design ideas. They liked her approach and design style, and she was hired to design both. The design was accepted due to its playful design, the customized Catull typeface and unique visual expression.

== Background ==
Born in Campinas, São Paulo, Brazil, she moved to Israel where she received a degree in Architecture from the Technion - Israel Institute of Technology. She moved to the US to attend the Stanford University master's Program in Design.

== Career ==
Her master's thesis was on playing card design, and she was commissioned by Adobe Systems to be one of the designers of the Adobe Deck, a promotional deck of playing cards produced in 1988. She went on to design the award-winning Analog Deck and Duolog Deck.

She was a visiting art professor at the Stanford Art Department from 1988 to 1999. It was while at Stanford that she was commissioned to design the Google logo.

Ruth practices the Martial Art of Aikido and holds the rank of Godan, 5th degree black belt. She teaches Aikido at Aikido West in Redwood City, CA.

As an artist, Ruth is experimental by nature, and her work is drawn from personal stories about her life journey. Kedar often revisits and revises early artworks, injecting them with new life and new meaning. She calls this process "conversations with my younger self".
