= Dennis Hwang =

South Korean graphic artist (born 1978)

- 황정목
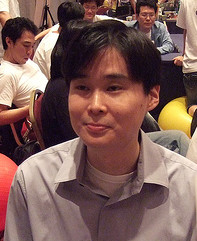
- Born: Hwang Jeong-mok c. 1978 (age 47–48); Knoxville, Tennessee, U.S.
- Education: Gwacheon Elementary School; Munwon Middle School; Bearden High School
- Alma mater: Stanford University
- Occupation: Graphic artist
- Employer(s): Google (former); Niantic
- Known for: Google doodles
- Awards: Appalachian Arts Fellow Award

Korean name
- Hangul: 황정목
- Hanja: 黃正穆
- RR: Hwang Jeongmok
- MR: Hwang Chŏngmok

Hwang Jeong-mok (Korean: 황정목; born c. 1978), known professionally as Dennis Hwang, is a South Korean graphic artist currently working for Niantic, who was the original designer of some of the festive logos for Google.

== Early life and education ==
Born in Knoxville, Tennessee, he moved to South Korea when he was about five years old. His hometown was Gwacheon where he "had a very normal childhood". He went through public schools, spending six years at Gwacheon Elementary School and two years at Munwon Middle School, before returning to Knoxville and graduating from Bearden High School. His doodles during these years were frowned upon. On a return visit to Knoxville in 2003, Hwang was awarded an Appalachian Arts Fellow Award at World's Fair Park by then-mayor Victor Ashe. Ashe proclaimed, "Mr. Hwang's work is impressioned hundreds of millions of times each week, and reaches all corners of the globe. He is arguably Knoxville's most persistent artist."

He received a degree from Stanford in arts and computer science.

== Career ==
During the Burning Man festival of 1998, Larry Page and Sergey Brin designed Google's first "doodle" for the purpose of notifying users of their absence. Subsequently, Hwang was assigned to create special Google logos. His first logo design for Google was in honor of Bastille Day, on July 14, 2000, at the request of Page and Brin, and he went on to design a great many specialty logos. By 2005, he was creating about 50 Google logos each year. Hwang has designed Google logos commemorating Thanksgiving, Christmas, and other events such as Piet Mondrian's birthday. He also designed the iconic Gmail logo on the night before its release.

His position within Google was international webmaster, which made him responsible for all of their international content.
