= Jimmy Colquitt =

American football player (born 1963)

No. 5
- Position: Punter

Personal information
- Born: January 17, 1963 (age 63); Knoxville, Tennessee, U.S.
- Listed height: 6 ft 4 in (1.93 m)
- Listed weight: 209 lb (95 kg)

Career information
- High school: Doyle (Knoxville)
- College: Tennessee
- NFL draft: 1985: undrafted

Career history
- New York Giants (1985)*; Seattle Seahawks (1985); Tampa Bay Buccaneers (1986)*
- * Offseason or practice squad member only

Awards and highlights
- 2× Second-team All-SEC (1981, 1982)

Career NFL statistics
- Punts: 12
- Punt yards: 481
- Punt average: 40.1
- Stats at Pro Football Reference

James Michael Colquitt (born January 17, 1963) is an American former professional football player who was a punter in the National Football League (NFL). He was signed by the Seattle Seahawks as an undrafted free agent in 1985, playing in two games for them. He played college football for the Tennessee Volunteers.

He is the nephew of former NFL punter Craig Colquitt and cousin to Craig's sons, former NFL punters Britton Colquitt and Dustin Colquitt.
