= Catull =

Serif typeface

- Category: Serif
- Classification: Old-style
- Designer: Gustav Jaeger
- Foundry: Berthold
- Date released: 1982
- Sample

Catull is a serif typeface created by Gustav Jaeger for the Berthold Type Foundry in 1982. It was notably used as the typeface for the Google logo from 31 May 1999, to 31 August 2015.
