= Dustin Colquitt =

American football player (born 1982)

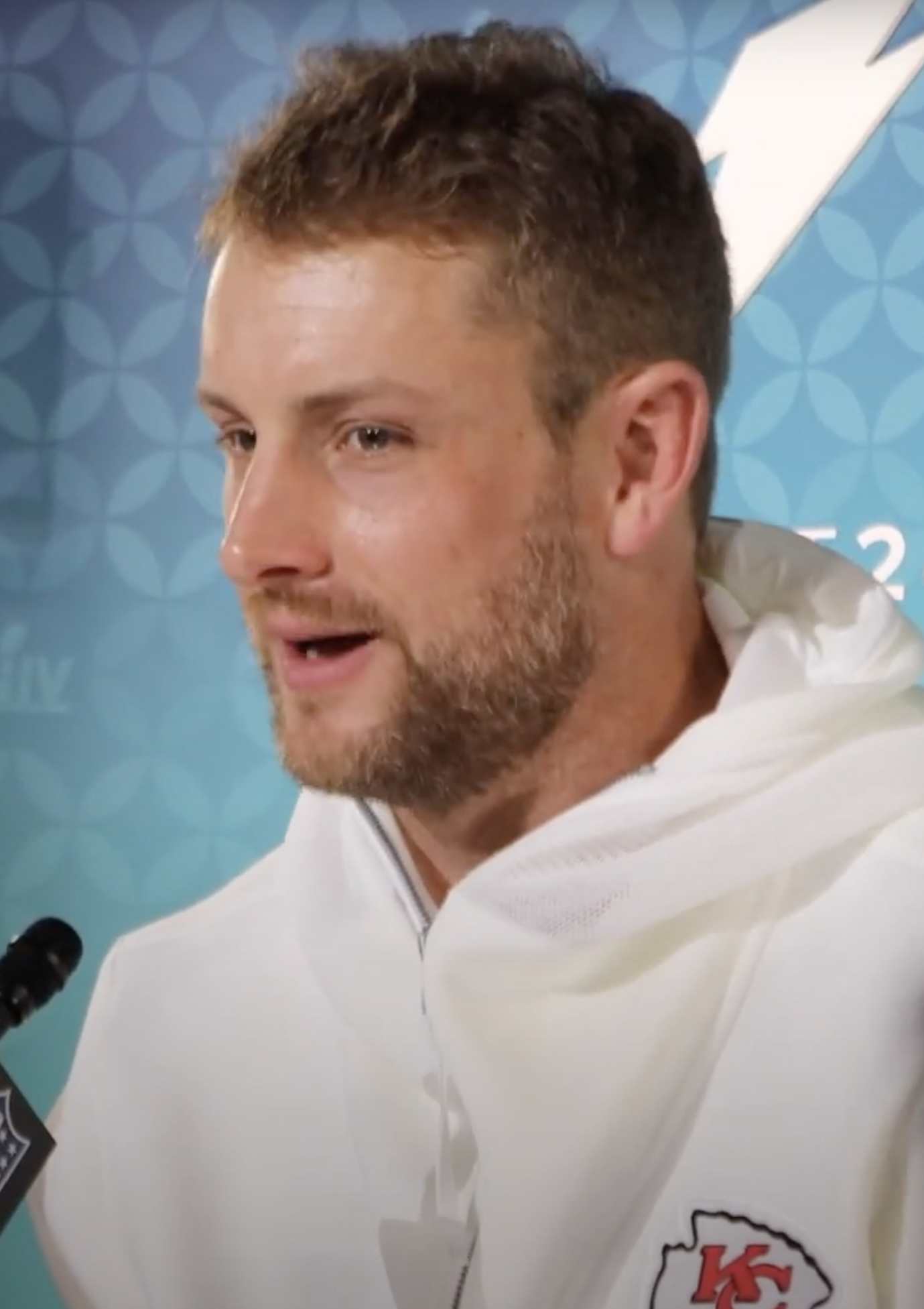
- Colquitt with the Kansas City Chiefs in 2020

No. 2, 1, 4, 12
- Position: Punter

Personal information
- Born: May 6, 1982 (age 44); Knoxville, Tennessee, U.S.
- Listed height: 6 ft 3 in (1.91 m)
- Listed weight: 210 lb (95 kg)

Career information
- High school: Bearden (Knoxville)
- College: Tennessee (2000–2004)
- NFL draft: 2005: 3rd round, 99th overall pick

Career history
- Kansas City Chiefs (2005–2019); Pittsburgh Steelers (2020); Tampa Bay Buccaneers (2020)*; Jacksonville Jaguars (2020); Kansas City Chiefs (2020)*; Atlanta Falcons (2021); Cleveland Browns (2021)
- * Offseason or practice squad member only

Awards and highlights
- Super Bowl champion (LIV); 2× Pro Bowl (2012, 2016); Consensus All-American (2003); First-team All-SEC (2003); Second-team All-SEC (2004)

Career NFL statistics
- Punts: 1,198
- Punting yards: 53,660
- Punting average: 44.8
- Longest punt: 81
- Inside 20: 483
- Touchbacks: 103
- Stats at Pro Football Reference

Dustin Farr Colquitt (born May 6, 1982) is an American former professional football player who was a punter in the National Football League (NFL). He played college football for the Tennessee Volunteers and was selected by the Kansas City Chiefs in the third round of the 2005 NFL draft. With the Chiefs, he won Super Bowl LIV over the San Francisco 49ers. In addition, he played for the Pittsburgh Steelers, Jacksonville Jaguars, Atlanta Falcons, and Cleveland Browns.

In 2019, he set a Chiefs franchise record for most games played, surpassing former teammate Will Shields.

== Early life ==
Colquitt is from Knoxville, Tennessee, and played football and soccer at Bearden High School in Knoxville.

== College career ==
Colquitt accepted an athletic scholarship to attend the University of Tennessee in Knoxville, and played for coach Phillip Fulmer's Tennessee Volunteers football team from 2001 to 2004. As a junior in 2003, he was recognized as a first-team All-Southeastern Conference (SEC) selection, and a consensus first-team All-American. As a senior in 2004, he again earned first-team All-SEC honors.

== Professional career ==
Pre-draft measurables
Height	Weight	40-yard dash
6 ft 2 in (1.88 m)	211 lb (96 kg)	4.88 s
All values from NFL Combine

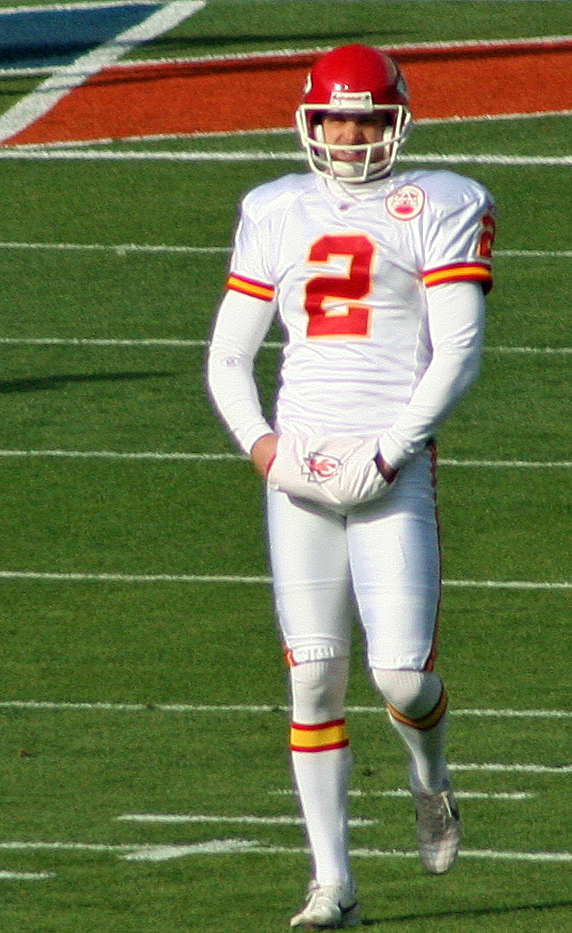
Colquitt with the Chiefs in 2010.

=== Kansas City Chiefs (first stint) ===
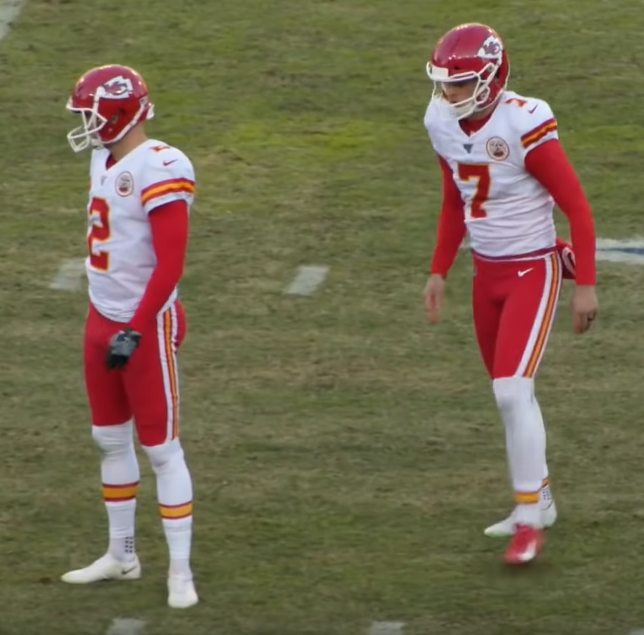
Colquitt and Harrison Butker in 2019

The Kansas City Chiefs selected Colquitt in the third round (99th pick overall) of the 2005 NFL draft. He signed a three-year contract worth $1.345 million. As a rookie, he finished with 65 punts for 2,564 total yards for a 39.45 average. In the 2006 season, he finished with 71 punts for 3,145 total yards for a 44.30 average.

During the 2007 NFL season, he set the franchise record for the longest punt with an 81-yard punt. He finished the 2007 season with 95 punts for 4,322 total yards for a 45.49 average. On February 28, 2008, Colquitt was signed to a five-year contract extension worth $8.5 million. In the 2008 season, he had 70 punts for 3,110 total yards for a 44.43 average. Colquitt had career highs during the 2009 NFL season in both punts and punting yards with 96 and 4,361, respectively. His 4,361 punting yards were second to Jim Arnold's 4,397 during the 1984 NFL season. In 2010, he was voted as the winner of the Ed Block Courage Award. In the 2010 season, he finished with 88 punts for 3,908 total yards for a 44.41 average. In the 2011 season, he had 89 punts for 4,084 total yards for a 45.89 average.

In the 2012 season, he had a punting average of 46.8 on 83 punts, the highest he has ever had in a season. From 2005 to 2012, Colquitt had 657 career punts with a 44.7 yard average. Colquitt was named to his first Pro Bowl in 2012. On March 5, 2013, Colquitt signed a five-year contract extension worth $18.75 million, with $8.9 million guaranteed, making him the NFL's highest paid punter. In the 2013 season, he had 87 punts for 4,005 total yards for a 46.03 average. In the 2014 season, he had 71 punts for 3,164 total yards for a 44.56 average. In Week 11 of the 2015 season, he won AFC Special Teams Player of the Week. In the 2015 season, he had 75 punts for 3,333 total yards for a 44.44 average.

In 2016, Colquitt was named to his second Pro Bowl after fellow punter Pat McAfee declined to play due to an injury. He finished the 2016 season with 76 punts for 3,427 total yards for a 45.09 average. During the 2017 NFL season, he became the Chiefs all-time leader in both punts and punting yards passing Jerrel Wilson. He finished the 2017 season with 65 punts for 2,936 total yards for a 45.17 average. On March 15, 2018, Colquitt signed a three-year contract extension with the Chiefs. In the 2018 season, he had 45 punts for 2,021 total yards for a 44.91 average. In the 2019 season, Colquitt had 48 punts for 2,126 total yards for a 44.29 average. He played in and won his first Super Bowl after the Chiefs defeated the San Francisco 49ers 31–20.

Colquitt was released on April 28, 2020. In his 15 seasons with the Chiefs, he set multiple team records including being tied with fellow punter Jerrel Wilson for the longest tenured player in franchise history.

=== Pittsburgh Steelers ===
Colquitt signed a one-year contract with the Pittsburgh Steelers on September 7, 2020. He was released on October 23. He played in five games with the Steelers.

=== Tampa Bay Buccaneers ===
On December 18, 2020, Colquitt signed with the practice squad of the Tampa Bay Buccaneers.

=== Jacksonville Jaguars ===
Colquitt was signed off the Buccaneers' practice squad by the Jacksonville Jaguars on December 24, 2020. He was waived on January 5, 2021. He played in one game with the Jaguars in the 2020 season.

=== Kansas City Chiefs (second stint) ===
On January 7, 2021, right before the playoffs, Colquitt signed with the practice squad of the Chiefs. His practice squad contract with the team expired after the season on February 16, 2021.

=== Atlanta Falcons ===
Colquitt signed with Atlanta Falcons' practice squad on September 21, 2021. He was promoted to the active roster on October 5. After missing two games due to COVID-19, he was released on December 6 in favor of Thomas Morstead. He played in six games for the Falcons in the 2021 season.

=== Cleveland Browns ===
Colquitt was signed by the Cleveland Browns on December 10, 2021. He played in five games for the Browns in the 2021 season.

Colquitt announced his retirement on June 4, 2025, after 17 seasons.

== NFL career statistics ==
Legend
	Won the Super Bowl
**Bold**	Career high

Regular season statistics
Year	Team	GP	Punting				
Year	Team	GP	Punts	Yards	Avg	Lng	Blk
2005	KC	**16**	65	2,564	39.4	62	0
2006	KC	**16**	71	3,145	44.3	72	0
2007	KC	**16**	95	4,322	45.5	**81**	**1**
2008	KC	14	70	3,110	44.4	73	0
2009	KC	**16**	**96**	**4,361**	45.4	70	**1**
2010	KC	**16**	88	3,908	44.4	72	**1**
2011	KC	**16**	89	4,084	45.9	68	0
2012	KC	**16**	83	3,887	**46.8**	71	0
2013	KC	**16**	87	4,005	46.0	65	**1**
2014	KC	**16**	71	3,164	44.6	69	0
2015	KC	**16**	75	3,333	44.4	62	0
2016	KC	**16**	76	3,427	45.1	64	0
2017	KC	**16**	65	2,936	45.2	77	0
2018	KC	**16**	45	2,021	44.9	67	0
2019	KC	**16**	48	2,126	44.3	68	**1**
2020	PIT	5	20	861	43.0	59	0
2020	JAX	1	6	272	45.3	53	0
2021	ATL	6	23	1,096	47.7	66	0
2021	CLE	5	25	1,038	41.5	56	0
Career		255	1,198	53,660	44.8	81	5

=== Accomplishments ===
- Chiefs franchise record for longest punt (81 yards, 2007)
- Chiefs franchise record for games played by any position (238)
- Chiefs franchise record for seasons played (15, tied)
- Chiefs franchise record for punting yards (50,393)
- Chiefs franchise record for punts (1,124)
- Chiefs franchise record most punts downed inside of the 20 (483)

== Personal life ==
Colquitt is married with five children. Colquitt comes from a family with a distinguished lineage of punters, including his father Craig, who played for the Pittsburgh Steelers from 1978 to 1984. His younger brother Britton also played for Tennessee, as did his cousin Jimmy. After winning Super Bowl LIV, Colquitt became the third member of his family to win a Super Bowl (Craig won XIII and XIV, Britton won 50 with the Broncos).

Colquitt is a devout Roman Catholic Christian. His wife, Christia, is a Catholic schools teacher. It is also known that his son, Brinkley Colquitt, attends The Catholic University of America, where he serves as Student Body Vice President.

Colquitt is a co-founder of TeamSmile, an organization that offers free dental care to underserved children. Colquitt was picked to be the Chiefs nominee for the Walter Payton NFL Man of the Year Award in 2009 and 2018.

== See also ==
- List of second-generation National Football League players
