= Google logo =

Company logo

The current Google logo, in use since May 19, 2026

The Google logo appears in numerous settings to identify the search engine company. Google has used several logos over its history, with the first logo created by Sergey Brin using GIMP. A revised logo debuted on September 1, 2015, with slight modifications made on May 19, 2026. The previous logo, with slight modifications between 1999 and 2013, was designed by Ruth Kedar, with a wordmark based on the Catull font, an old style serif typeface designed by Gustav Jaeger for the Berthold Type Foundry in 1982.

The company also includes various modifications or humorous features, such as modifications of their logo for use on holidays, birthdays of famous people, and major events, such as the Olympics. These special logos, some designed by Dennis Hwang, became known as Google Doodles.

== History ==
In 1997, Larry Page created a computerized version of the Google letters using the free graphics program GIMP. In 1998, the typeface was changed and an exclamation mark was added, mimicking the Yahoo! logo.

"There were a lot of different color iterations", says Ruth Kedar, the graphic designer who developed the now-famous logo in May 1999. "We ended up with the primary colors, but instead of having the pattern go in order, we put a secondary color on the L, which brought back the idea that Google doesn't follow the rules." The font Catull was used, "I was trying to find something that was both traditionally tied to the beautiful fonts in the past and also had a very current and in some ways surprising ways", says Ruth, "I really loved the way that it had these very elegant stems and ascenders and descenders and also had these Serifs that were very, very precise and I wanted something that when you looked at it, it was very clear that it's something you haven't seen before".

In 2010, the Google logo received its first major overhaul since May 31, 1999. The new logo was first previewed on November 8, 2009, and was officially launched on May 6, 2010. It uses a different hue for the second "o" as it is distinctly more orange-colored in place of the previously more yellowish "o", as well as a much more subtle shadow rendered in a different shading style. By November 2010, it was then rolled out in many places from within Google, replacing the old 1999 Google logo.

On September 19, 2013, Google introduced a new "flat" (two-dimensional) logo with a slightly altered color palette. The old 2010 Google logo remained in use on some pages, such as the Google Doodles page, for a period of time. On May 24, 2014, the Google logo was slightly updated with some minor typographical tweaks, with the second 'g' moved right one pixel and the 'l' moved down and right one pixel.

On September 1, 2015, Google introduced a controversial "new logo and identity family" designed to work across multiple devices. The colors are slightly different than the previous logo with more brighter hues, however the most notable difference in the logo is the change in the typeface. It switched to a modern, geometric sans-serif typeface called Product Sans, created in-house at Google (which is also used for the Alphabet logo). On May 19, 2026, the Google logo was slightly updated with some minor tweaks, including a modified version of Google Sans and slightly brighter hues, which is currently in use alongside the 2015 Google logo.

The logos from Google's early years up to the modern era would be reused for Google's birthday in the later years, with all logo designs from 1997 to 2015 being used in an animated doodle on September 27, 2023. The 1998 design was reused in a specialized doodle on September 27, 2008, while the original logo itself would be reused on September 27, 2025; the 1997 design would be used for the first time since 1998 on September 27, 2026.

Google logos
The initial Google logo used from September 15, 1997 to September 27, 1998.

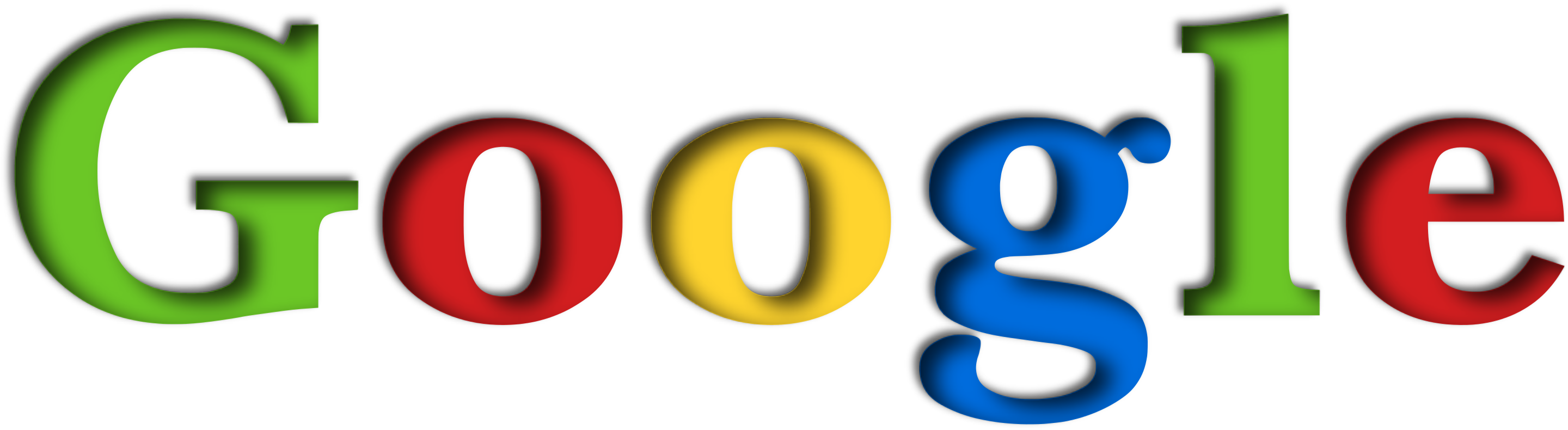
The logo used from September 28, 1998 to October 29, 1998, using the Baskerville Bold typeface, with a different color combination from the one in use today (the initial "G" being colored green).

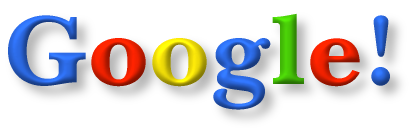
The logo used from October 30, 1998 to May 30, 1999. It added an exclamation mark to the end, an increased shadow, more rounded letters, and slightly different color combinations (the color of the initial "G" being changed from green to blue), which is still used today (although with different hues and font).

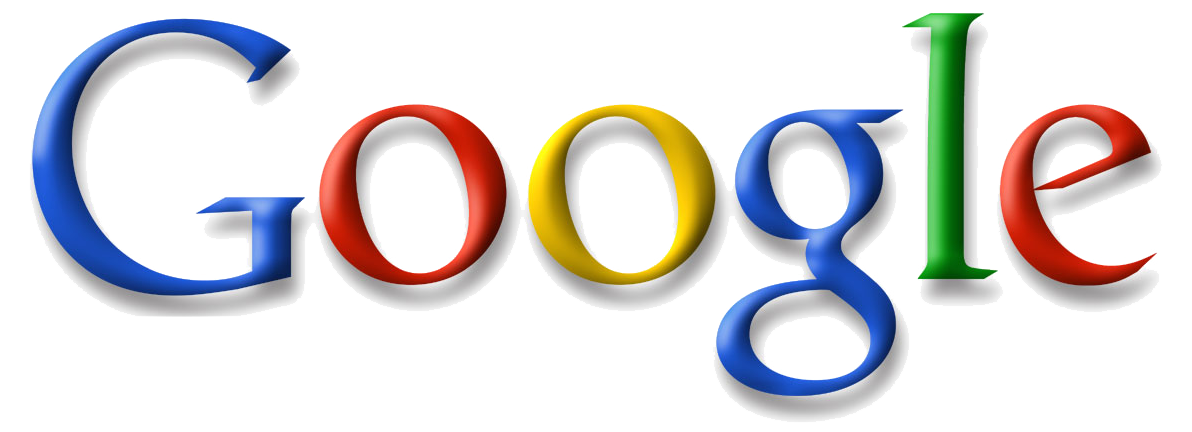
The company logo changed to one based on the Catull typeface and was used from May 31, 1999 to May 5, 2010. The exclamation mark was removed, and it remained the basis for the logo until August 31, 2015.

The logo used from May 6, 2010 to September 18, 2013, showing a reduced distance of the projected shadow, slightly different hues (including a change in the second "o" to a different yellow hue) and a more flattened lettering.

The logo used from September 19, 2013 to August 31, 2015, showing flattened and altered lettering, as well as the removal of shadows.

The logo used from September 1, 2015 to May 18, 2026, with slightly brighter hues and using the Product Sans typeface instead of Catull. This remains the basis for the logo as of today (although with different hues and font).

The logo used since May 19, 2026, with a slightly modified version of Google Sans and slightly brightened hues.

== Google Doodles ==
The first Google Doodle was in honor of the Burning Man Festival of 1998. The doodle was designed by Larry Page and Sergey Brin to notify users of their absence in case the servers crashed. Subsequent Google Doodles were designed by an outside contractor, until Larry and Sergey asked then-intern Dennis Hwang to design a logo for Bastille Day in 2000. Today, doodles are designed and published by a team of employees ("doodlers").

== Colorless logo ==
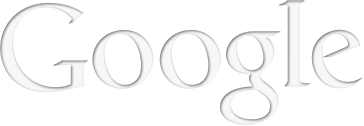
The white colorless Google logo used from 2011 until September 2015, when a background image/doodle is set on the Google Chrome home page

The colorless Google logo used for the funeral of George H. W. Bush on December 8, 2018, the death of Queen Elizabeth II on September 8, 2022, and the funeral of Jimmy Carter on January 9, 2025, as well as for Memorial Day from May 2019 to May 2025

A colorless version of the logo is particularly used on a local homepage in recognition of a major tragedy, often for several days. The logo in this case is rendered in grayscale as opposed to being colored. It was first used on the Google Poland homepage in April 2010 following the Smolensk air disaster that killed, among others, Polish president Lech Kaczyński. A few days later, the logo was used in China and Hong Kong to pay respects to the victims of the 2010 Qinghai earthquake.

On September 7, 2010, a colorless Google logo going by the name of the "Keystroke Logo" was introduced, which lit up with the standard Google colors as the first 6 letters of a search query were entered.

A new version of the colorless logo was introduced on December 5, 2018, following the death of George H. W. Bush, and was used again on May 27, 2019, for Memorial Day (and again annually until May 2025), on September 8, 2022, following the death of Queen Elizabeth II (a black version of the colorless logo was used for the funeral of Queen Elizabeth II a week later on September 19, 2022) and on January 9, 2025, following the death of Jimmy Carter.

A white version of the colorless logo is used in Google Chrome when a background image is set on the main home page, which can also appear when dark mode is selected in the browser.

== Favicon ==
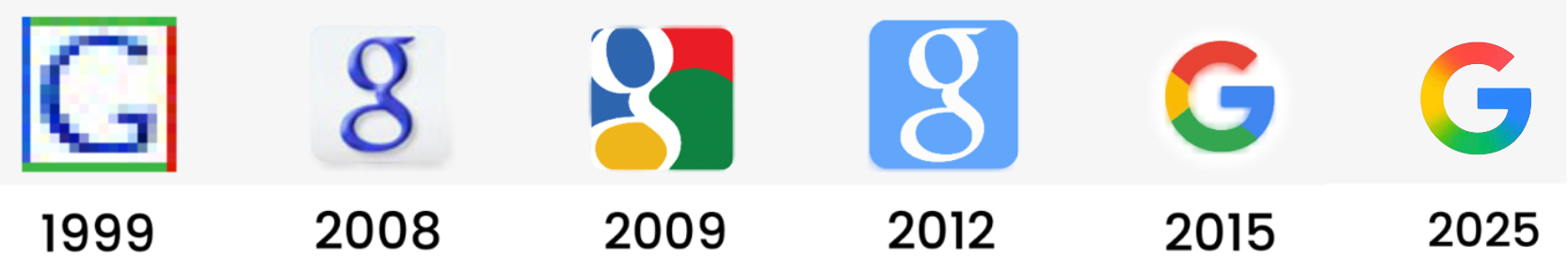
List of Google favicons from 1999–2025

The current Google "G" favicon, with the first version (top) used from September 1, 2015 to May 11, 2025 (though still used in some cases) and the second version (bottom) used since May 12, 2025

Google's first favicon was a blue, uppercase "G" on a white background accompanied by a border with a blue side on the left, a red side on the right, and a green side on the top and bottom, debuting with Google's then-new logo design on May 31, 1999.

On May 30, 2008, a new favicon was launched, showing a lowercase "g" from Google, colored in blue against a white background. It was originally intended to be a part of a larger set of icons developed for better scalability on mobile devices.

A new favicon was launched on January 9, 2009. It included a left-aligned white lowercase "g" with background areas colored in red, green, blue and yellow, with the top, bottom, and left edges of the "g" cropped. It was based on a design by André Resende, a computer science undergraduate student at the University of Campinas in Brazil. He submitted it for a contest launched by Google in June 2008 to receive favicon submissions. The official Google blog stated: "His placement of a white 'g' on a color-blocked background was highly recognizable and attractive, while seeming to capture the essence of Google".

The favicon used from August 13, 2012, to August 31, 2015, showed the lowercase "g" in white, centered on a solid light blue background.

On September 1, 2015, a new favicon was launched in conjunction with the new logo design that day, which shows a capital letter "G" in the tailor-made font for the new logo, with segments colored red, yellow, green, and blue. It was updated with a gradient between the colored segments on May 12, 2025, which visually connects with the gradient present in the logo of Google's generative AI chatbot Gemini.
