= Britton Colquitt =

American football player (born 1985)

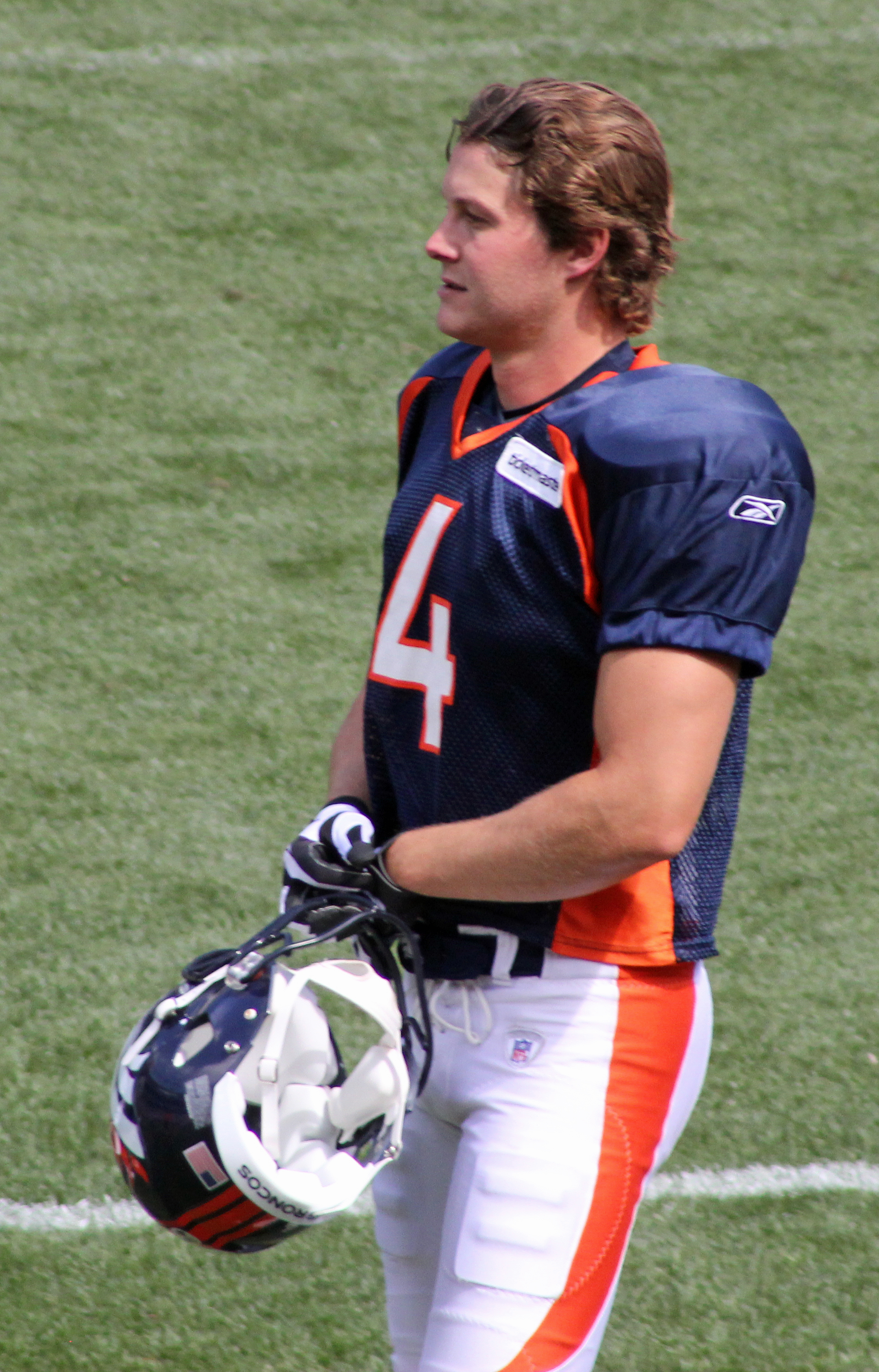
- Colquitt with the Denver Broncos in 2011

No. 4, 2
- Position: Punter

Personal information
- Born: March 20, 1985 (age 41); Knoxville, Tennessee, U.S.
- Listed height: 6 ft 3 in (1.91 m)
- Listed weight: 210 lb (95 kg)

Career information
- High school: Bearden (Knoxville)
- College: Tennessee (2004–2008)
- NFL draft: 2009: undrafted

Career history
- Denver Broncos (2009)*; Miami Dolphins (2009)*; Denver Broncos (2009–2015); Cleveland Browns (2016–2018); Minnesota Vikings (2019–2020)
- * Offseason or practice squad member only

Awards and highlights
- Super Bowl champion (50); NFL punting yards leader (2011); First-team All-SEC (2006); Second-team All-SEC (2007)

Career NFL statistics
- Punts: 834
- Punting yards: 37,897
- Punting average: 45.4
- Longest punt: 79
- Inside 20: 262
- Stats at Pro Football Reference

Britton Douglas Colquitt (born March 20, 1985) is an American former professional football player who was a punter in the National Football League (NFL). He was signed by the Denver Broncos as an undrafted free agent in December 2009. He played college football for the Tennessee Volunteers.

== Early life ==
Colquitt played football, basketball and soccer at Bearden High School in Knoxville, Tennessee.

== College career ==
Colquitt played college football for the Volunteers at the University of Tennessee, where he majored in political science. During the 2005, 2006, and 2007 seasons, he was the Volunteers first team punter. He earned consensus first-team All-SEC honors in 2006 and second-team All-SEC honors in 2007.

While at the University of Tennessee, Colquitt had a well-publicized saga with alcohol problems. He was first suspended from the University of Tennessee football team in March 2004 after three alcohol-related arrests, despite having only arrived on campus in 2003. In his junior season, he was suspended for the first five games of the season and had his scholarship stripped after being arrested on charges of DUI and leaving the scene of an accident.

== Professional career ==
Pre-draft measurables
Height	Weight	Arm length	Hand span	40-yard dash
6 ft 2 5/8 in (1.90 m)	205 lb (93 kg)	31 3/4 in (0.81 m)	9 in (0.23 m)	4.85 s
All values from NFL Combine

=== Denver Broncos (first stint) ===
Colquitt signed with the Denver Broncos on April 28, 2009. He was waived on September 1, 2009.

=== Miami Dolphins ===
Colquitt was signed to the practice squad of the Miami Dolphins on December 22, 2009.

=== Denver Broncos (second stint) ===
Colquitt was signed to the Broncos' active roster from the Miami Dolphins' practice squad on December 30, 2009.

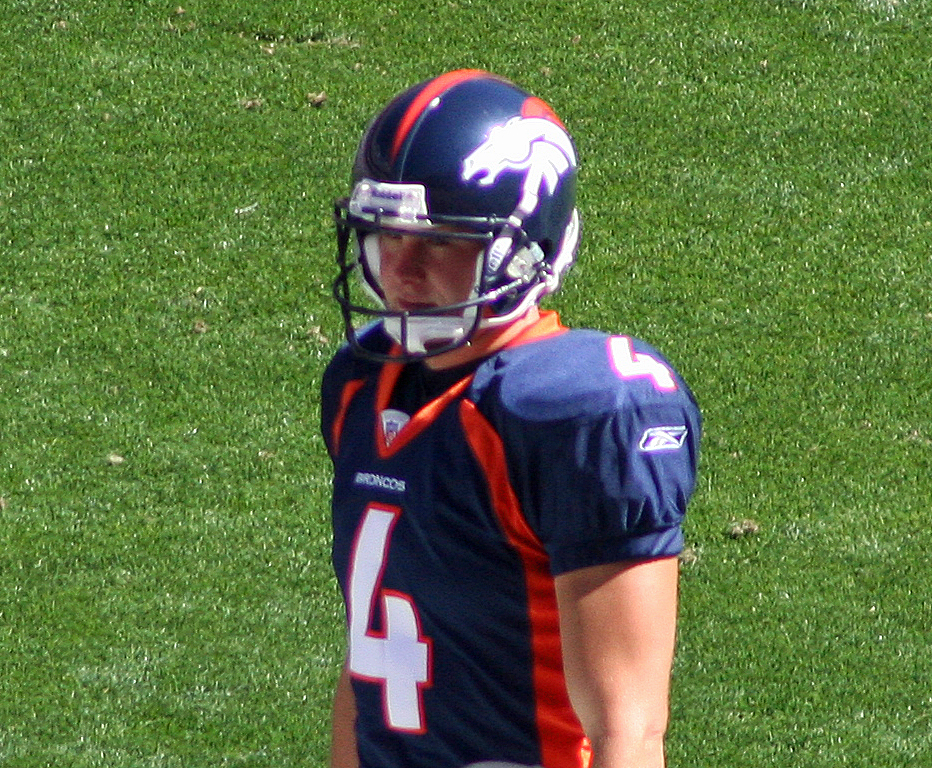
Colquitt in 2010

On September 12, 2010, in the season opener against the Jacksonville Jaguars, Colquitt made his NFL debut and had four punts for 172 net yards (43.00 average). He recorded 86 punts for 3,835 yards for a 44.59 average on the 2010 season.

In the 2011 season, Colquitt recorded 101 punts for a total of 4,783 yards, enough for fifth all time for single-season punting yards. He led the NFL in punting yards in the 2011 season.

In the 2012 season, Colquitt recorded 67 punts for 3,099 yards for a 46.25 average.

On April 23, 2013, Colquitt signed his restricted free agent tender. On August 11, 2013, he signed a three-year extension worth $11.6 million on top of his one-year tender. In the 2013 season, he had 65 punts for 2,893 yards for a 44.51 average. The Broncos reached Super Bowl XLVIII, which they lost to the Seattle Seahawks by a score of 43–8. In the loss, he had two punts for 60 net yards.

In the 2014 season, Colquitt had 69 punts for 3,048 net yards for a 44.17 average.

Colquitt agreed to a $1.4 million pay cut on August 3, 2015. In the 2015 season, he had 84 punts for 3,663 yards for a 43.61 average.

On February 7, 2016, Colquitt was part of the Broncos team that won Super Bowl 50. In the game, the Broncos defeated the Carolina Panthers by a score of 24–10, giving Colquitt his first Super Bowl victory.

On August 30, 2016, Colquitt was released by the Broncos due to not accepting a pay cut.

==== Franchise records ====
- Punting yards in a season: 4,783 in 2011
- Net punting yards in a season: 4,058 in 2011
- Yards per punt in a season: 47.4 in 2011
- Most punts inside the 20 in a season: 33 in 2011

=== Cleveland Browns ===
On September 3, 2016, Colquitt signed a one-year deal with the Cleveland Browns worth $1.7 million. He had 83 punts for 3,761 yards for a 45.31 average in the 2016 season.

On February 28, 2017, Colquitt signed a four-year, $11.2 million contract extension with the Browns. In the 2017 season, he had 80 punts for 3,811 yards for a 47.64 average.

In the 2018 season, Colquitt had 83 punts for 3,767 yards for a 45.39 average. Colquitt had the longest punt of the 2018 season by any punter with a 79-yard punt.

On August 31, 2019, Colquitt was released by the Browns.

=== Minnesota Vikings ===
On September 1, 2019, Colquitt was signed by the Minnesota Vikings. In the 2019 season, he had 62 punts for 2,802 yards for a 45.19 average.

On March 19, 2020, Colquitt signed a three-year, $9 million contract extension with the Vikings. In the 2020 season, he had 54 punts for 2,435 yards for a 45.09 average.

On September 1, 2021, Colquitt was released by the Vikings after the team signed Jordan Berry.

== NFL career statistics ==
Legend
	Won the Super Bowl
	Led the league
**Bold**	Career high

=== Regular season ===
Year	Team	GP	Punting				
Year	Team	GP	Punts	Yards	Avg	Lng	Blk
2009	DEN	0	DNP				
2010	DEN	16	86	3,835	44.6	63	0
2011	DEN	16	**101**	**4,783**	47.4	66	0
2012	DEN	16	67	3,099	46.3	67	0
2013	DEN	16	65	2,893	44.5	60	1
2014	DEN	16	69	3,048	44.2	65	0
2015	DEN	16	84	3,663	43.6	62	0
2016	CLE	16	83	3,761	45.3	65	0
2017	CLE	16	80	3,811	**47.6**	67	1
2018	CLE	16	83	3,767	45.4	**79**	**2**
2019	MIN	16	62	2,802	45.2	59	0
2020	MIN	16	56	2,435	45.1	59	**2**
Career		176	834	37,903	45.5	79	6

== Personal life ==
Several of Colquitt's family members have punted in the NFL. His father, Craig, won two Super Bowl rings playing for the Pittsburgh Steelers. His older brother, Dustin, spent 15 seasons as the punter for the Kansas City Chiefs and won a Super Bowl ring after the Chiefs victory in Super Bowl LIV. His cousin Jimmy punted at Tennessee. Jimmy played in the NFL with the Seattle Seahawks in 1985.

== See also ==
- List of second-generation National Football League players
