= Craig Colquitt =

American football player (born 1954)

No. 5
- Position: Punter

Personal information
- Born: June 9, 1954 (age 72); Knoxville, Tennessee, U.S.
- Listed height: 6 ft 1 in (1.85 m)
- Listed weight: 182 lb (83 kg)

Career information
- High school: South (Knoxville)
- College: Tennessee
- NFL draft: 1978: 3rd round, 76th overall pick

Career history
- Pittsburgh Steelers (1978–1984); Indianapolis Colts (1987)

Awards and highlights
- 2× Super Bowl champion (XIII, XIV); 2× First-team All-SEC (1976, 1977)

Career NFL statistics
- Punts: 431
- Punt yards: 17,795
- Longest punt: 74
- Stats at Pro Football Reference

Joseph Craig Colquitt (born June 9, 1954) is an American former professional football player who was a punter for eight seasons in the National Football League (NFL) with the Pittsburgh Steelers (1978–1981, 1983–1984) and Indianapolis Colts (1987). He played college football for the Tennessee Volunteers and was selected by the Steelers with the 76th overall pick in the third round of the 1978 NFL draft. He was a member of two Super Bowl championship teams with the Steelers in 1978 and 1979.

Colquitt's nephew, Jimmy Colquitt, was a punter for the Seattle Seahawks in 1985. He is also the father of two former NFL punters, Dustin and Britton Colquitt. All four played college football at the University of Tennessee. Both his sons won Super Bowl rings, Britton with the Broncos and Dustin with the Chiefs. Craig was inducted into the Greater Knoxville Hall of Fame on July 16, 2009. Craig is the author of the children's book: "JoJo! What Happened To Your Hair?".

== NFL career statistics ==
Legend
	Won the Super Bowl
**Bold**	Career high

=== Regular season ===
Year	Team	Punting									
Year	Team	GP	Punts	Yds	Net Yds	Lng	Avg	Net Avg	Blk	Ins20	TB
1978	PIT	**16**	66	2,642	2,323	58	40.0	35.2	0	14	4
1979	PIT	**16**	68	2,733	2,297	61	40.2	33.8	0	19	8
1980	PIT	**16**	61	2,483	2,166	54	40.7	**35.5**	0	13	5
1981	PIT	**16**	**84**	**3,641**	**2,963**	**74**	**43.3**	35.3	0	**25**	**16**
1983	PIT	**16**	80	3,352	2,794	58	41.9	34.9	0	20	7
1984	PIT	**16**	70	2,883	2,432	62	41.2	34.7	0	21	5
1987	IND	1	2	61	54	33	30.5	18.0	**1**	0	0
Career		97	431	17,795	15,029	74	41.3	34.8	1	112	45

=== Playoffs ===
Year	Team	Punting									
Year	Team	GP	Punts	Yds	Net Yds	Lng	Avg	Net Avg	Blk	Ins20	TB
1978	PIT	**3**	6	254	171	53	42.3	28.5	0	2	**1**
1979	PIT	**3**	7	297	**265**	**66**	42.4	**37.9**	0	**4**	**1**
1983	PIT	1	**8**	**327**	255	51	40.9	31.9	0	0	**1**
1984	PIT	2	5	216	187	49	**43.2**	31.2	**1**	0	0
Career		9	26	1,094	878	66	42.1	32.5	1	6	3
