= Tennessee Volunteers football =

Football team of the University of Tennessee

2026 Tennessee Volunteers football team
- First season: 1891; 135 years ago (Note: The 1894 and 1895 teams were unofficial.)
- Athletic director: Danny White
- Head coach: Josh Heupel; 6th season, 52–22 (.703)
- Location: Knoxville, Tennessee
- Stadium: Neyland Stadium (capacity: 101,915)
- Field: Shields–Watkins Field
- NCAA division: Division I FBS
- Conference: SEC
- Colors: Orange and white
- All-time record: 890–424–53 (.670)
- CFP record: 0–1 (.000)
- Bowl record: 30–25 (.545)

National championships
- Claimed: 1938, 1940, 1950, 1951, 1967, 1998
- Unclaimed: 1931

National finalist
- Bowl Alliance: 1997
- BCS: 1998

College Football Playoff appearances
- 2024

Conference championships
- SIAA: 1914 SoCon: 1927, 1932 SEC: 1938, 1939, 1940, 1946, 1951, 1956, 1967, 1969, 1985, 1989, 1990, 1997, 1998

Division championships
- SEC East: 1997, 1998, 2001, 2003, 2004, 2007
- Consensus All-Americans: 41
- Rivalries: Vanderbilt (rivalry); Alabama (rivalry); Kentucky (rivalry); Florida (rivalry); Georgia (rivalry); Auburn (rivalry); Georgia Tech (rivalry)

Uniforms
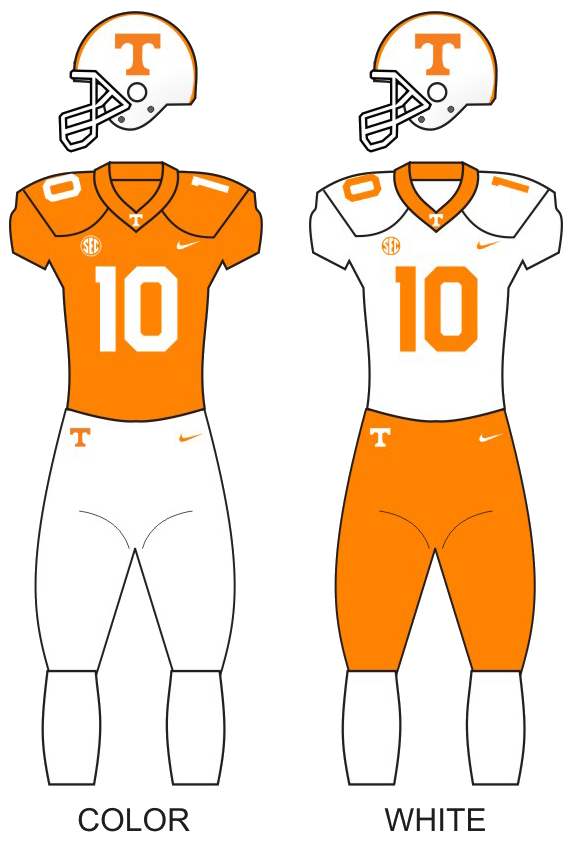
- Fight song: Down the Field (official); Rocky Top (unofficial)
- Mascot: Smokey XII
- Marching band: Pride of the Southland Band
- Outfitter: Adidas
- Website: UTSports.com

The Tennessee Volunteers football program (variously called "Vols," "UT", and "Big Orange") represents the University of Tennessee. The Volunteers compete in the Football Bowl Subdivision (FBS) of the National Collegiate Athletic Association (NCAA), as members of the Southeastern Conference (SEC).

The Vols have played football for 132 seasons, starting in 1891; their combined record of 870–415–53 (.670) ranks them fourteenth on the all-time win list for NCAA football programs. Their all-time ranking in bowl appearances is fifth (55) and eighth in all-time bowl victories (30), most notably four Sugar Bowls, three Cotton Bowls, two Orange Bowls, a Fiesta Bowl, and a Peach Bowl. They have won 16 conference championships and claim six national titles, including two (1951, 1998) from the major wire-service selectors: AP Poll and/or Coaches' Poll.

The Vols play at Neyland Stadium on the university campus in Knoxville, where they have won 485 games, the highest home-field total in college football history for any school at its current home venue. Additionally, its 101,915-seat capacity makes Neyland the nation's sixth largest and third largest in the Southeastern Conference.

== History ==
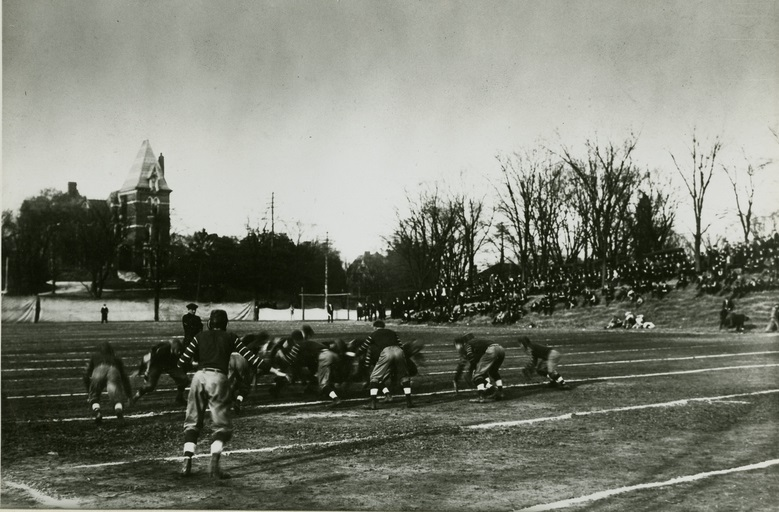
Tennessee playing at Wait Field in 1911

Tennessee football began in 1891 and developed unevenly through its early decades, enduring periods without official teams, wartime interruptions, and frequent coaching turnover. The program started to gain more prominence in the early 20th century under coaches such as Zora Clevenger, whose 1914 team won an undefeated Southern Intercollegiate Athletic Association championship, and especially Robert Neyland, who took over in 1926. Neyland established Tennessee as a national power, compiling dominant records, long unbeaten and shutout streaks, and multiple conference titles. The 1939 team is still the only team in history to finish the entire regular season without giving up a single point. The 1951 team featured Hank Lauricella, that season's Heisman Trophy runner up, and Doug Atkins, a future member of the Pro Football Hall of Fame. The Vols romped to a 10–0 regular season record and captured the AP Poll national championship. During this era, Shields–Watkins Field evolved into Neyland Stadium, which became a defining symbol of the program and one of college football's largest and most recognizable venues.

Tennessee University students were called 'The Volunteers' (Vols for short) because of the state of Tennessee's claim as the 'Volunteer state'. This is due to the immense contribution that the state of Tennessee gave in the war against Mexico over Texas. That name has stayed throughout the entirety of UT's history. See more information in Tennessee § Statehood and antebellum era page. Tennessee, as of 2026, is now 1-3 all time against the University of Texas.

Following Neyland's retirement and death, Tennessee experienced fluctuating success through the 1950s and early 1960s, highlighted by an SEC championship under Bowden Wyatt in 1956, this season ended in controversy over the highly contested 1956 Heisman Trophy race between Tennessee's Johnny Majors, Notre Dame's Paul Hornung, and Syracuse's Jim Brown. Hornung won the Heisman controversially despite playing for a 2-8 Notre Dame. The program modernized under Doug Dickey (1964–69), who introduced the T-formation offense, the "Power T" logo, the checkerboard end zones, and the "running through the T" tradition, while winning two SEC titles. After mixed results under Bill Battle, Johnny Majors restored national relevance in the 1980s with SEC championships in 1985, 1989, and 1990, including the Sugar Bowl victory over Miami that earned the 1985 team the nickname "Sugar Vols." Tennessee reached another peak under Phillip Fulmer, winning multiple SEC championships and capturing the 1998 national championship. Led by quarterback Tee Martin, All American linebacker Al Wilson, and wide receiver Peerless Price, the Vols finished the season 13–0 including a victory in the inaugural BCS National Championship Game against Florida State, 23–16.

After Fulmer's departure in 2008, Tennessee entered a prolonged period of instability marked by frequent coaching changes and inconsistent performance. Following the turbulent 2017 season and a widely scrutinized coaching search, Alabama defensive coordinator Jeremy Pruitt was hired in December 2017, with former head coach Phillip Fulmer returning as athletic director. Pruitt's tenure (2018–2020) produced mixed results and ended amid NCAA investigations. In January 2021, Tennessee hired Josh Heupel, formerly the head coach at UCF, signaling a strategic shift toward a fast-paced, offense-driven identity. Heupel's arrival marked a renewed effort to restore Tennessee's competitiveness and national standing within the Southeastern Conference.

== Conference affiliations ==
Tennessee has been a member of the Southeastern Conference since its founding in 1932.

- Independent (1891–1895)
- Southern Intercollegiate Athletic Association (1896–1921)
- Southern Conference (1922–1932)
- Southeastern Conference (1933–present)

== Rivalries ==
The Vols' main rivalries include the Alabama Crimson Tide (Third Saturday in October) and Vanderbilt Commodores. Tennessee's longest and most played rivalry is with the Kentucky Wildcats. Since the formation of the SEC Eastern Division in 1992, the Vols have had emerging rivalries with the Florida Gators, Georgia Bulldogs, and the South Carolina Gamecocks. None of their games have trophies, although Kentucky–Tennessee used to battle over a trophy called the Beer Barrel from 1925 until 1999. The Volunteers used to have important rivalries with the Georgia Tech Yellow Jackets and Auburn Tigers until Georgia Tech left the SEC and realignment forced them to drop Auburn from the schedule annually. Starting in the 2026-2027 NCAA Football Season, The Vols' three annual opponents are the Alabama Crimson Tide, the Kentucky Wildcats, and the Vanderbilt Commodores. Because of this scheduling change, the Vols will no longer annually play the Florida Gators (an annual opponent since 1990) or the Georgia Bulldogs (an annual opponent since 1992).

== Championships ==
=== National championships ===
Tennessee has been selected as national championships six times from NCAA-designated major selectors, including twice (2) from major wire-services: AP Poll and Coaches Poll. Tennessee claims all six national championships.

The Associated Press (AP) has selected Tennessee as national champions twice, in 1951 and 1998. The No. 1 Vols lost in the Sugar Bowl following the 1951 season after being named AP and UPI national champions due to the polls being conducted before the bowl season prior to 1965 and 1974 respectively. The 1938 and 1950 championships, while not AP titles, were recognized by a majority and a plurality of overall selectors/polls, respectively.

Year	Coach	Selectors	Record	Bowl	Opponent	Result	Final AP	Final Coaches
1938	Robert Neyland	Berryman, Billingsley, Boand, Dunkel, College Football Researchers Association, Houlgate, Litkenhous, Poling, Sagarin, Sagarin (ELO-Chess)	11–0	Orange	Oklahoma	W 17–0	No. 2	–
1940	Robert Neyland	Dunkel	10–1	Sugar	Boston College	L 13–19	No. 4	–
1950	Robert Neyland	Billingsley, DeVold, Dunkel, Football Research, National Championship Foundation, Sagarin (ELO-Chess)	11–1	Cotton	Texas	W 20–14	No. 4	No. 3
1951	Robert Neyland	Associated Press, Litkenhous, United Press International (coaches), Williamson	10–1	Sugar	Maryland	L 13–28	No. 1	No. 1
1967	Doug Dickey	Litkenhous	9–2	Orange	Oklahoma	L 24–26	No. 2	No. 2
1998	Phillip Fulmer	Associated Press, BCS, FW, National Football Foundation, USA Today	13–0	Fiesta (BCS National Championship Game)	Florida State	W 23–16	No. 1	No. 1

Tennessee has also been awarded national championships by various notable organizations in six additional years of 1914, 1931, 1939, 1956, 1985, and 1989, though the school claims none.

=== Conference championships ===
Tennessee has won a total of 16 conference championships, including 13 SEC championships.

Year	Conference	Coach	Overall record	Conference record
1914	SIAA	Zora Clevenger	9–0	5–0
1927†	SoCon	Robert Neyland	8–0–1	5–0–1
1932†	SoCon	Robert Neyland	9–0–1	7–0–1
1938	SEC	Robert Neyland	11–0	7–0
1939	SEC	Robert Neyland	10–1	6–0
1940	SEC	Robert Neyland	10–1	6–0
1946†	SEC	Robert Neyland	9–2	5–0
1951†	SEC	Robert Neyland	10–1	5–0
1956	SEC	Bowden Wyatt	10–1	6–0
1967	SEC	Doug Dickey	9–2	6–0
1969	SEC	Doug Dickey	9–2	5–1
1985	SEC	Johnny Majors	9–1–2	5–1
1989†	SEC	Johnny Majors	11–1	6–1
1990	SEC	Johnny Majors	9–2–2	5–1–1
1997	SEC	Phillip Fulmer	11–2	7–1
1998	SEC	Phillip Fulmer	13–0	8–0

=== Division championships ===
As winners of the Southeastern Conference's Eastern Division, Tennessee has made five appearances in the SEC Championship Game, with the most recent coming in 2007. The Vols are 2–3 in those games.

Year	Division Championship	Opponent	Result
1997	SEC East	Auburn	W 30–29
1998	SEC East	Mississippi State	W 24–14
2001	SEC East	LSU	L 20–31
2003†	SEC East	N/A lost tiebreaker to Georgia	
2004	SEC East	Auburn	L 28–38
2007†	SEC East	LSU	L 14–21

† Co-champions

== Head coaches ==
Tennessee has had 24 head coaches since it began play during the 1891 season. Robert Neyland is the leader in seasons coached and games won, with 173 victories in 21 seasons (spread out over three stints). John Barnhill has the highest winning percentage of those who have coached more than one game, with .846. James DePree has the lowest winning percentage of those who have coached more than one game, with .306. Of the 23 different head coaches who have led the Volunteers, Neyland, Wyatt, Dickey, Majors, and Fulmer have been inducted into the College Football Hall of Fame in Atlanta.

== Bowl games ==
This is a list of Tennessee's ten most recent bowl games. Tennessee holds an all-time bowl game record of 30–25 through the 2023 season, due to the removal of the vacated win from 2019.

Season	Coach	Bowl	Opponent	Result
2007	Phillip Fulmer	Outback Bowl	#18 Wisconsin	W 21–17
2009	Lane Kiffin	Chick-fil-A Bowl	#11 Virginia Tech	L 14–37
2010	Derek Dooley	Music City Bowl	North Carolina	L 27–30 ^{2OT}
2014	Butch Jones	TaxSlayer Bowl	Iowa	W 45–28
2015	Butch Jones	Outback Bowl	#13 Northwestern	W 45–6
2016	Butch Jones	Music City Bowl	Nebraska	W 38–24
2019	Jeremy Pruitt	Gator Bowl	Indiana	W 23–22^{vacated}
2021	Josh Heupel	Music City Bowl	Purdue	L 45–48 ^{OT}
2022	Josh Heupel	Orange Bowl †	#7 Clemson	W 31–14
2023	Josh Heupel	Citrus Bowl	#17 Iowa	W 35–0
2024	Josh Heupel	CFP First Round †	#8 Ohio State	L 17–42

† CFP/New Year's Six game

Tennessee's all-time appearances and victories of 56 & 31 (on-field results) rank fifth and fourth, respectively. With the removal of the vacated 2019 victory, they stand at 55 appearance and 30 victories, which rank as sixth and seventh.

== Logos and uniforms ==
Now and for most of their history, the Volunteers have worn orange jerseys with white numbers at home and white jerseys with orange numbers on the road. The standard helmets have been white with an orange stripe down the center for decades (with a short-lived two-striped variation in 1973), and the "Power T" logo on either side. Uniform pants have changed over time, with the standard being white with two orange stripes down the side. Orange pants with white stripes were introduced in 1977 are still occasionally worn as an alternate, both at home and on the road.

The Volunteers originally wore black uniforms from 1911 to 1920, later replaced with orange jerseys with black wool numbers were first worn on September 23, 1922, in a 50–0 win against Emory & Henry. In 1935, the jerseys were white with orange stripes on the sleeves, but this changed in 1936 to orange jerseys and white numbers, which were on the front for the first time. This combination has since become the standard for the team, with limited variation. Black numbers and stripes returned in 1963 before going away again in 1964. The 1971 season saw the introduction of player names on jerseys, as well as orange shoulders on road jerseys, which would last until 1974. Later alternates have taken inspiration from this look, including games in 2004, 2014, and 2023. The numbers on white jerseys were outlined in black until the 2013 season, and the outlines have not returned for on-field play since.

The pants for the team have gone through several iterations, but have mostly maintained a white or orange base color with stripes. Orange debuted as the base color in 1977 under Johnny Majors and appeared occasionally until his retirement, and have been used sporadically since. Stripes have usually been a part of the pants, but were absent from 1995 to 2002.

In 1995, Adidas signed on to be the official uniform supplier of Tennessee football, an agreement that would last until 2015, when Nike took over as official supplier. The switch to Nike included several small touches, including a checkerboard pattern on the back of the helmet stripe, a switch to a single stripe on the pants, and most notably a new bespoke number font that incorporated angles from the state of Tennessee's borders. The helmet and pants striping changes have since been undone, but the number font remains. In 2025, Adidas signed a 10-year deal with the university, and returned as the official supplier on July 1, 2026.

Alternate uniforms

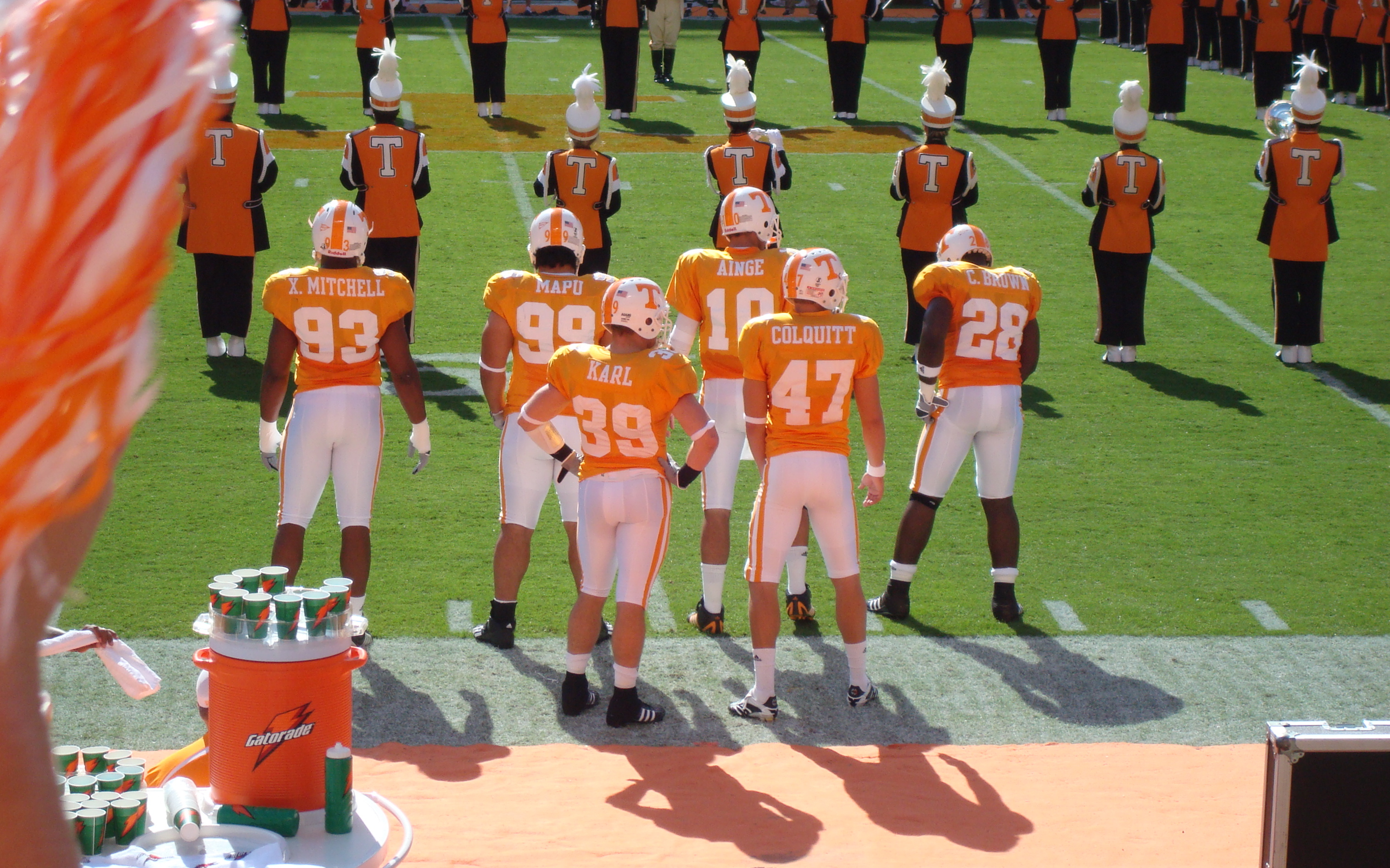
Tennessee Volunteer jerseys in 2007

In 2009, the Volunteers wore black jerseys with orange pants on Halloween night against the South Carolina Gamecocks. Black "Dark Mode" uniforms returned in 2021, making their return as a regularly featured uniform in Tennessee's first conference game of the season versus South Carolina, with white helmets featuring black trim. Black helmets were originally planned but were unavailable due to supply shortages from the COVID-19 pandemic. Fully black helmets would debut in 2022 in the late October night game versus Kentucky. "Dark Mode" uniforms have since become an annual staple of the Tennessee uniform schedule, typically being worn in a night time home game around Halloween.

On October 5, 2013, the team debuted its "Smokey Grey" uniforms in an overtime loss to the Georgia Bulldogs at Neyland Stadium, featuring grey jerseys, grey pants with orange stripes outlined in white, with the traditional orange and white helmets. The same grey uniform set was worn again one more time in 2013 versus Vanderbilt before the switch to Nike.

The Nike Smokey Grey uniform, worn from 2015 to 2017 (plus a one-off in 2022), featured a two-toned gray uniform with darker shoulders, a helmet featuring a monochromatic mountain design with a solid orange strip that leads to a checkerboard pattern at the back, and a single orange stripe on the pants that matches the helmet stripe.

In 2023, the Smokey Greys were brought back on a three-year plan to introduce a variation each year called “The Volunteer Spirit”. 2023's "Artful Dodger" uniforms featured an orange collar and shoulder design in homage to the Condredge Holloway-led 1970s road uniforms and the return to double-striped pants. The helmet had the same mountain design, however the stripe was a thin and orange with a light grey facemask. They wore this look in a poor performance game against Austin Peay that finished 30–13.

2024's Volunteer Spirit Smokey Grey's were the first to feature an orange Tennessee tristar emblem on the shoulders and have the Tennessee word mark on the front of the jersey. The helmet was similar to the 2016 version with the only difference being the helmet strip that features a thin white stripe. This design would match the pants stripe and was inspired by the Tennessee state flag. These uniforms were worn for the 2024 home opening 69–3 win over the Chattanooga Mocs, marking the first time the University of Tennessee wore an alternate uniform to start the season.

2025's “Volunteer Spirit” design incorporates cues from military aircraft markings, including stencil-styled numbers, light gray trim, and light gray pants.

In 2026, to honor the late country singer Dolly Parton, the Tennessee volunteers are currently wearing a Dolly butterfly on their helmets. On October 3rd, 2026, the jerseys were smokey gray and Tennessee orange, with the field as a throwback for there old coach. That game was called the Neyland Legacy.

== Traditions ==
=== Orange and white ===
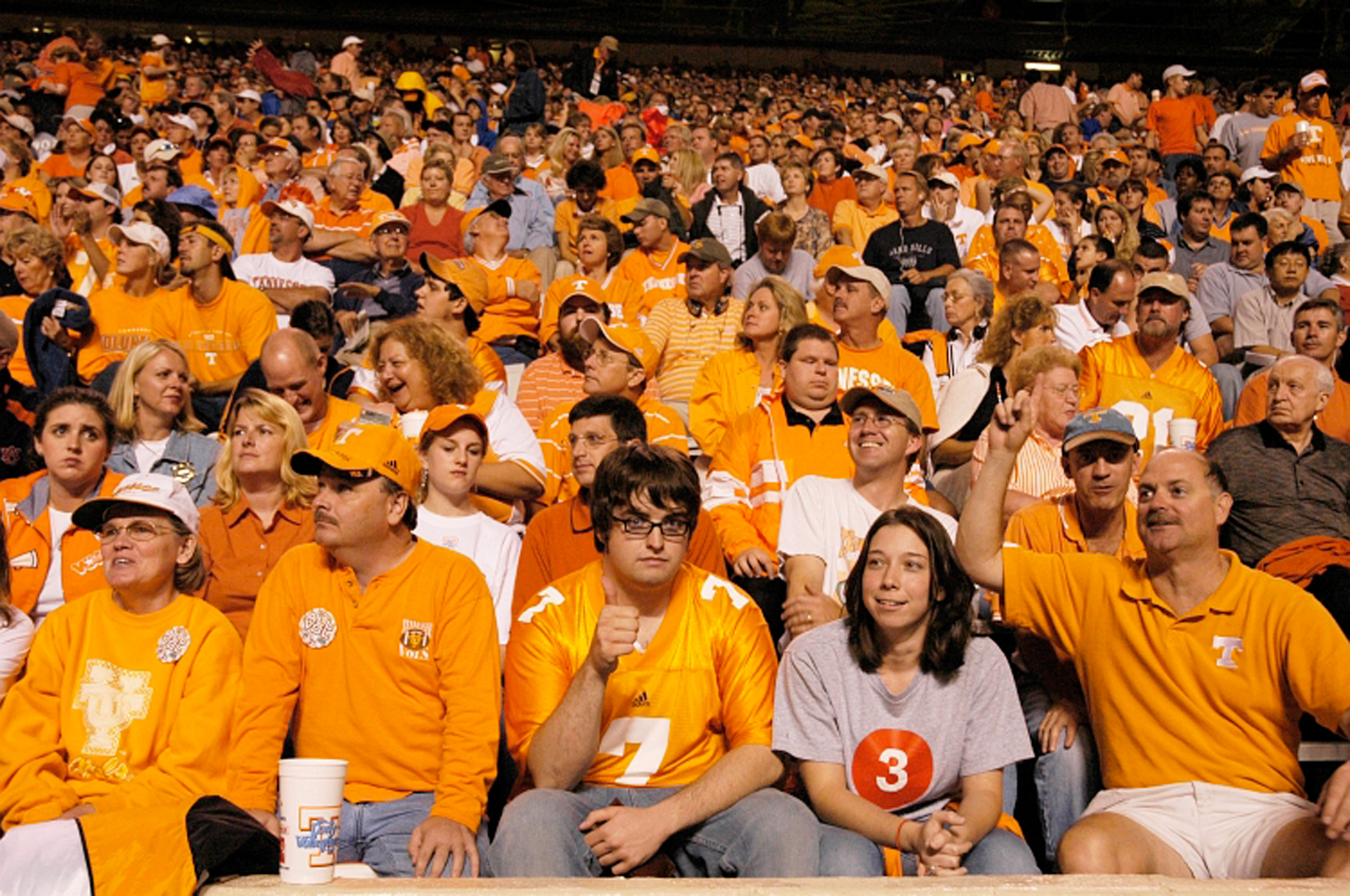
UT fans at Neyland Stadium wearing the school colors.

The orange and white colors worn by the football team were selected by Charles Moore, a member of the very first Tennessee football team in 1891. They were from the American Daisy which grew on The Hill, the home of most of the classrooms at the university at the time (now housing most of the chemistry and physics programs et al.). Tennessee football players did not wear the color until 1922 however.

The orange color is distinct to the school, dubbed "UT Orange", and has been offered by The Home Depot for sale as a paint, licensed by the university. Home games at Neyland Stadium have been described as a "sea of Orange" due to the large number of fans wearing the school color; the moniker Big Orange, as in "Go Big Orange!", derives from the usage of UT Orange.

The color is spot color PMS 151 as described by the university.

In addition to the famous orange and white, UT also has had the little-known Smokey Gray color since the 1930s and debuted the color in the October 5, 2013, rivalry game against Georgia in an alternate jersey.

=== Checkerboard end zones ===
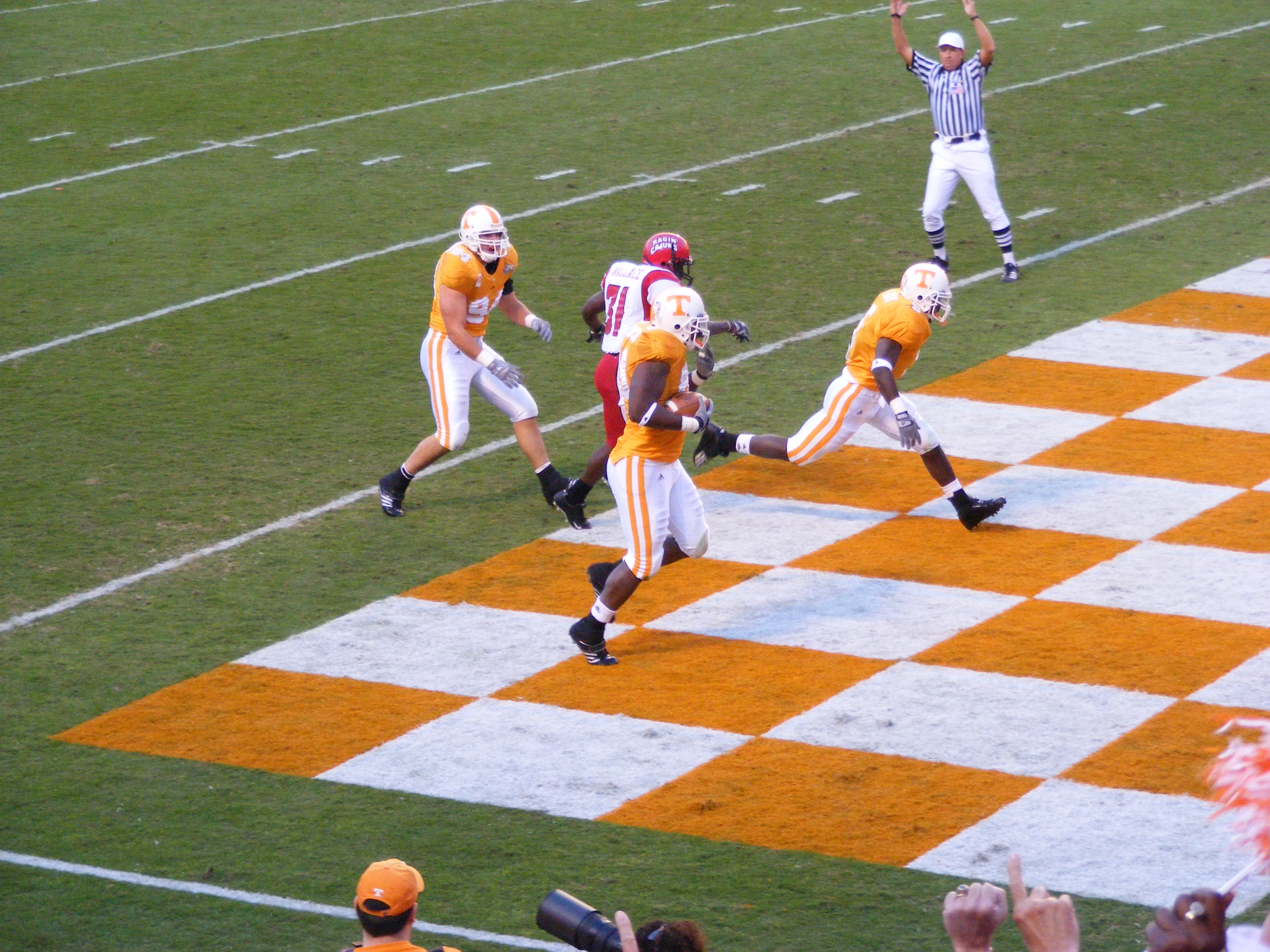
Orange and white checkerboard end zones are unique to Neyland Stadium.

Tennessee first sported their famous orange and white checkerboard end zone design, inspired by the checkerboard design around the top of the clock tower at the historic Ayres Hall, in 1964 under coach Dickey and remained until artificial turf was installed at Neyland Stadium in 1968. The checkerboard was brought back in 1989 with an orange border, which went away when natural grass returned to the field 1994. The return of natural grass brought with it the return of the empty grass colored border that exists today.

=== Rocky Top ===
Rocky Top is not the official Tennessee fight song (Down the Field is the official fight song), as is widely believed, but is the most popular in use by the Pride of the Southland Marching Band. The Band began playing the fight song during the 1970s after it became popular as a Bluegrass tune by the Osborne Brothers. The fight song is widely recognized as one of the most hated by opponents in collegiate sports. The song became one of Tennessee's state songs in 1982.

=== Smokey ===
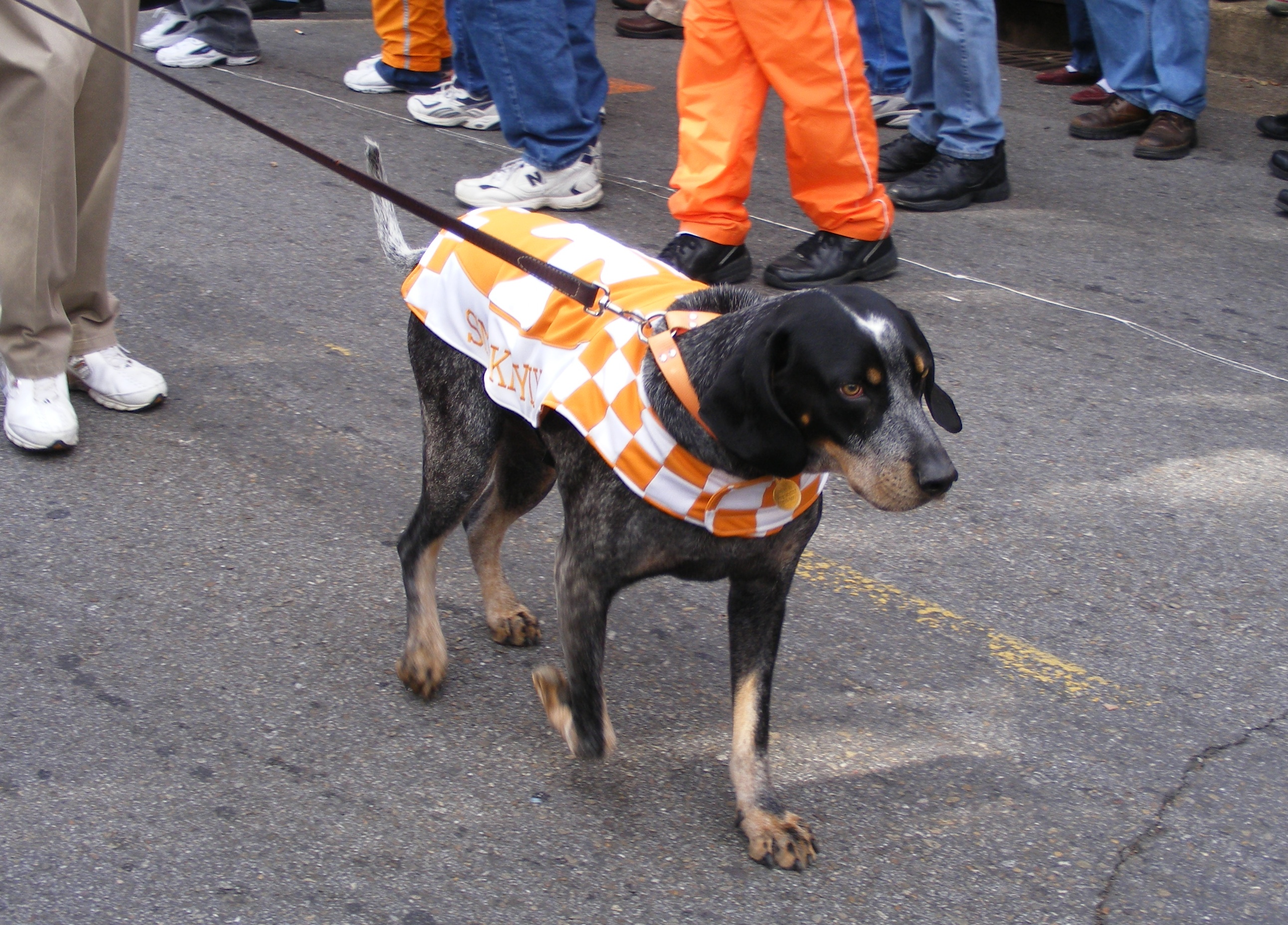
Smokey IX before a November 2007 game against Vanderbilt.

Smokey is the mascot of the University of Tennessee sports teams, both men's and women's. A Bluetick Coonhound mascot, Smokey X, leads the Vols on the field for football games. On game weekends, Smokey is cared for by the members of Alpha Gamma Rho's Alpha Kappa chapter. There is also a costumed mascot, which has won several mascot championships, at every Vols game.

Smokey was selected as the mascot for Tennessee after a student poll in 1953. A contest was held by the Pep Club that year; their desire was to select a coon hound that was native to Tennessee. At halftime of the Mississippi State game that season, several hounds were introduced for voting, all lined up on the old cheerleaders' ramp at Neyland, with each dog being introduced over the loudspeaker and the student body cheering for their favorite. The late Rev. Bill Brooks' "Blue Smokey" was the last hound announced and howled loudly when introduced. The students cheered and Smokey threw his head back and barked again. This kept going until the stadium was roaring and UT had found its mascot, Smokey. The current Smokey is Smokey XI, after Smokey X was retired at the conclusion of the 2022 season. The most successful dog has been Smokey VIII who saw a record of 91–22, two SEC titles, and the 1998 National Championship.

=== The Vol Walk ===
Head coach Johnny Majors came up with the idea for the Vol Walk after a 1988 game at Auburn when he saw the historic Tiger Walk take place. The walk became an official part of gameday in a Tennessee-Alabama match on October 20, 1990. Prior to each home game, the Vols will file out of the Neyland-Thompson Sports Complex, down past the Tennessee Volunteers Wall of Fame, and make their way down Peyton Manning Pass and onto Phillip Fulmer Way. Thousands of fans line the street to shake the players' hands as they walk into Neyland Stadium. Through rain, snow, sleet, or sunshine, the Vol faithful are always out in full force to root on the Vols as they prepare for the game. The fans are always pumped up with Rocky Top played by The Pride of the Southland Band.

=== The T ===
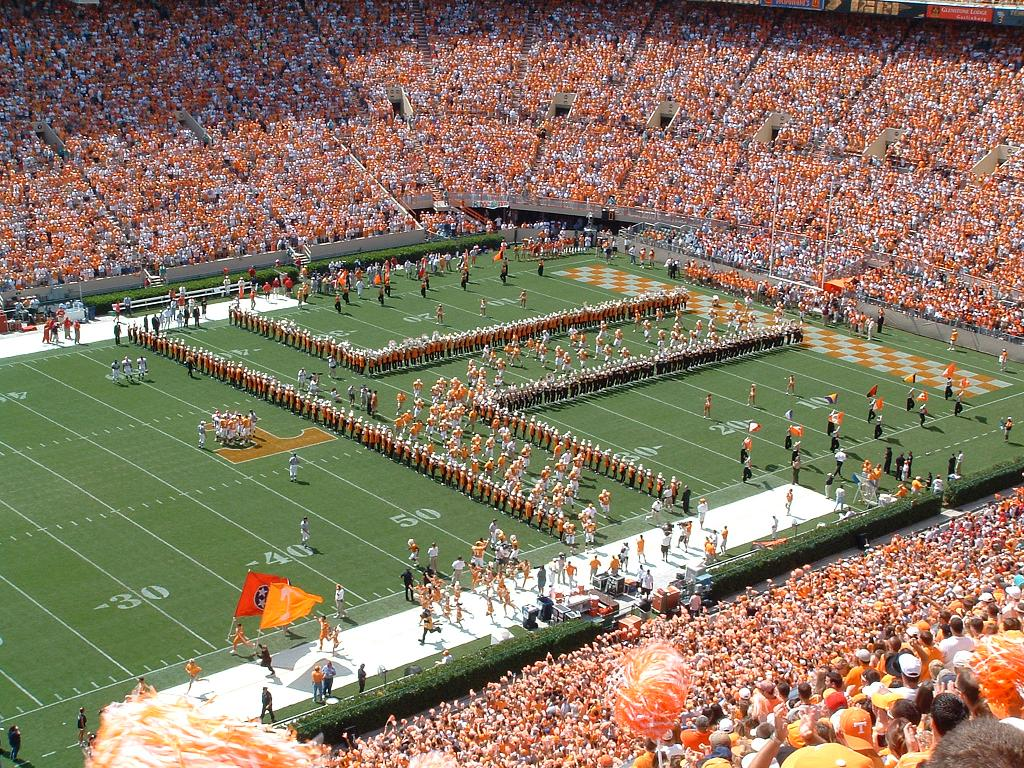
The Pride of the Southland is in formation while the UT team runs the T.

5 min video of the opening sequence of a football game

The "T" appears in two special places in Vol history and tradition. The "T" first appeared in 1964 when coach Doug Dickey added the familiar block letter T onto the side of the helmets; a rounded T came in 1968. Johnny Majors modified the famous orange helmet stripe to a thicker stripe in 1977.

The Vols also run through the T. This T is formed by the Pride of the Southland marching band with its base at the entrance to the Tennessee locker room in the north end zone with team personnel holding the state flag and the UT flag, Smokey running in on the field, and the entire UT team storming in to loud cheers and applause from the 100,000-plus Vols fans in Neyland. When Coach Dickey brought this unique and now-famous tradition to UT in 1965, the Vols' locker room was underneath the East stands. The Vols would run through the T and simply turn back to return to their sideline. However, beginning in 1983, the team would make the famous left turn inside the T and run toward their former bench on the east sideline when the locker room was moved from the east sideline to the north end zone. It was announced on January 24, 2010, that the Vols would switch their sideline from the east sideline to the west sideline for all home games from then on. This resulted in the Vols making a right out of the T instead of a left. This change took effect with Tennessee's first home game of the 2010 season against UT-Martin.

=== Vols ===
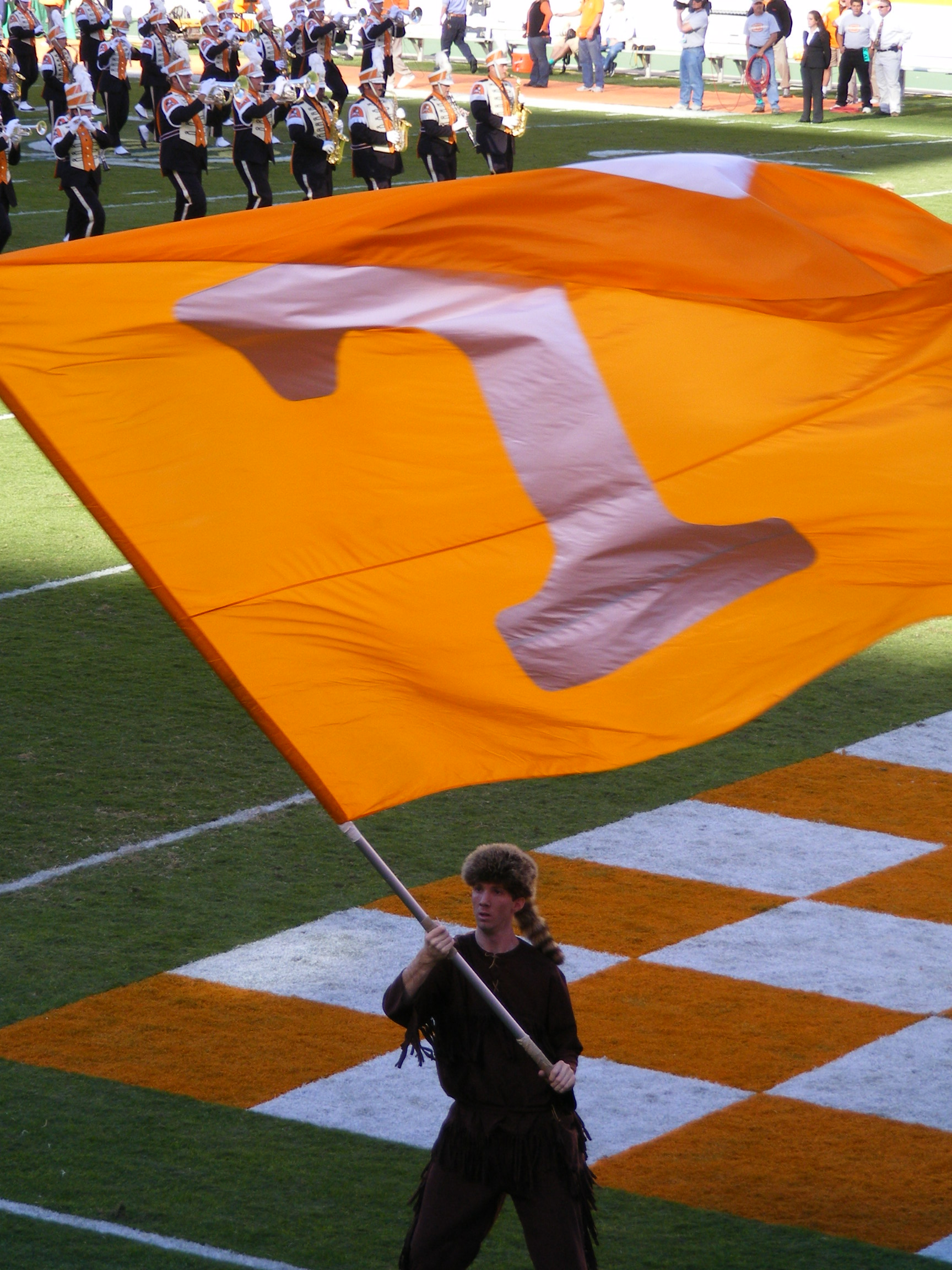
Davy Crockett waving the UT flag during a November 3, 2007, game against Louisiana–Lafayette

The Volunteers (or Vols as it is commonly shortened to) derive that nickname from the State of Tennessee's nickname. Tennessee is known as the "Volunteer State", a nickname it earned during the War of 1812, in which volunteer soldiers from Tennessee played a prominent role, especially during the Battle of New Orleans.

=== Vol Navy ===
Around 200 or more boats normally dock outside Neyland Stadium on the Tennessee River before games. The fleet was started by former Tennessee broadcaster George Mooney who docked his boat there first in 1962, as he wanted to avoid traffic around the stadium. What started as one man tying his runabout to a nearby tree and climbing through a wooded area to the stadium has grown into one of college football's unique traditions. Many fans arrive several days in advance to socialize, and the Vols have built a large walkway so fans can safely walk to and from the shoreline. UT, the University of Pittsburgh, Baylor University, and the University of Washington are the only schools with football stadiums built next to major bodies of water.

== All-time record ==
As of the end of the 2023 regular season, Tennessee was 11th all time in win-loss record by percentage and 10th by total wins. The all-time record is 870–415–53 (.670). At Neyland Stadium, the Vols have a record of 478–141–17 (.765). 11 additional wins from 2019 to 2020 were vacated by NCAA Committee on Infractions penalty ruling in July 2023. One of those victories was in a bowl game. Tennessee's all-time on-field record is 881–415–53(.673). The all-time on-field bowl record is 31–25(.554). Tennessee's all-time on-field record at Neyland Stadium is 494–142–18 (.770).

The UT football season records are taken from the official record books of the University Athletic Association. They have won 13 conference championships and six national titles in their history and their last national championship was in the 1998 college football season.

Tennessee holds the NCAA record for the most consecutive shutout wins with 17. The streak started with a Volunteers win against Tennessee-Chattanooga on November 30, 1938, and ended with a 27–12 loss against Alabama on October 19, 1940. During this streak, Tennessee outscored its opponents 479–0. Tennessee also holds the record for the most consecutive quarters opponents held scoreless, with 71.

The Vols play at Neyland Stadium, where Tennessee has an all-time winning record of 494 games, the highest home-field total in college football history for any school in the nation at its current home venue. The stadium surrounds Shields–Watkins Field, the official name of the playing surface. Go Vols.

== Hall of Fame ==
Tennessee boasts the 10th most college football hall of famers of all college football programs, with 27.

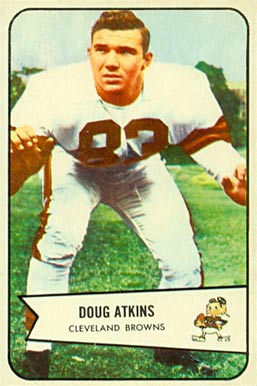
Hall of Fame DE Doug Atkins

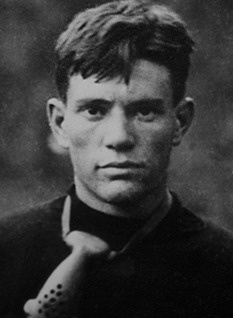
Hall of Fame G Nathan Dougherty, considered the "founding father of UT Athletics"

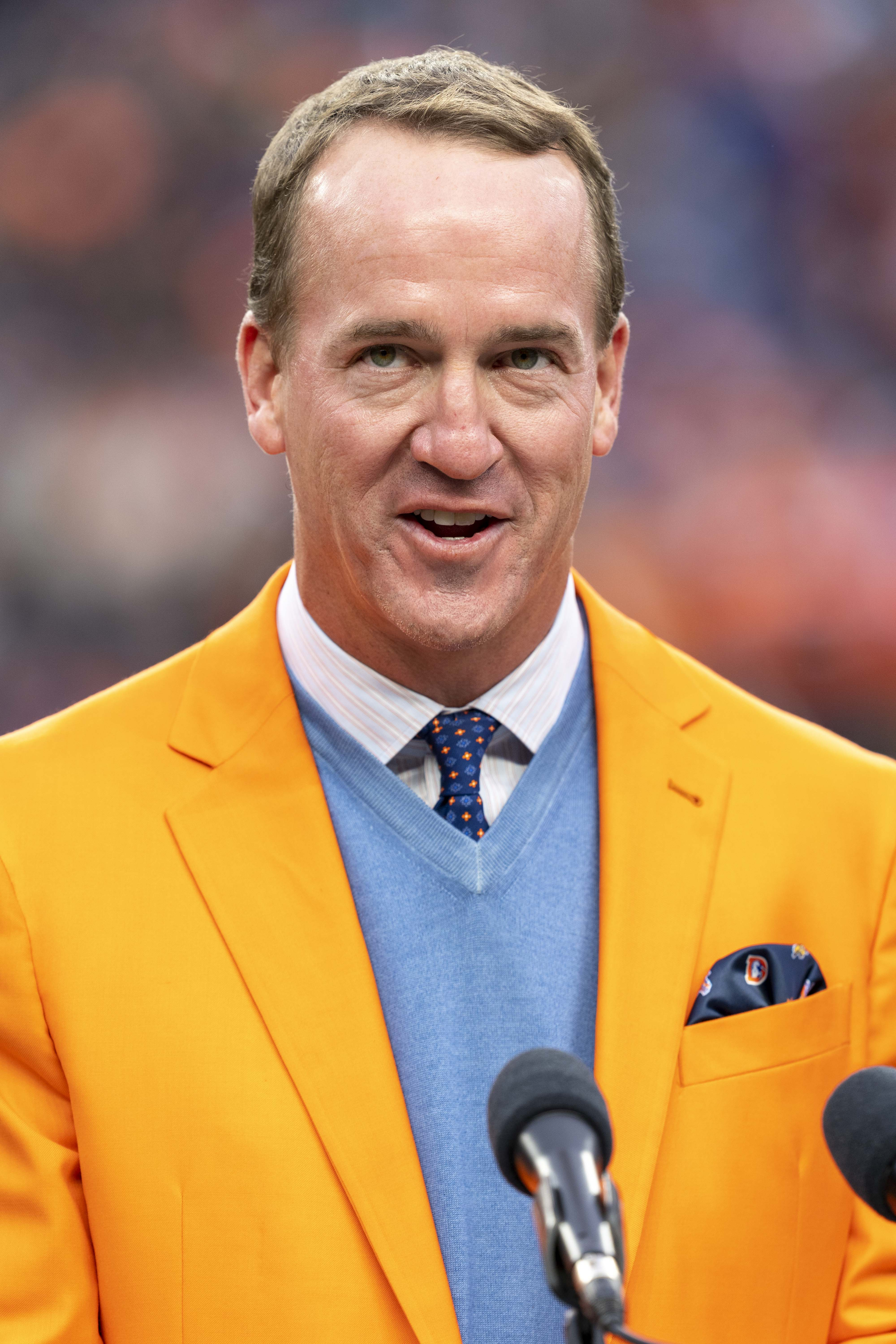
Hall of Fame QB Peyton Manning

=== Players ===
- Gene McEver – Elected 1954
- Beattie Feathers – Elected 1955
- Herman Hickman – Elected 1959
- Bobby Dodd – Elected 1959 (Player) and 1993 (Coach)
- Bob Suffridge – Elected 1961
- Nathan Dougherty – Elected 1967
- George Cafego – Elected 1969
- Bowden Wyatt – Elected 1972 (Player) and 1997 (Coach)
- Hank Lauricella – Elected 1981
- Doug Atkins – Elected 1985
  Also a member of the Pro Football Hall of Fame (Elected 1975)
- Joe Steffy – Elected 1987
  (Tennessee 1944; Army 1945–1947)
- Johnny Majors – Elected 1987
- Bob Johnson – Elected 1989
- Ed Molinski – Elected 1990
- Steve DeLong – Elected 1993
- John Michels – Elected 1996
- Steve Kiner – Elected 1999
- Reggie White – Elected 2002
  Also a member of the Pro Football Hall of Fame (Elected 2006)
- Frank Emanuel – Elected 2004
- Chip Kell – Elected 2006
- Peyton Manning – Elected 2017
  Also a member of the Pro Football Hall of Fame (Elected 2021)
- Al Wilson – Elected 2021
- Eric Berry – Elected 2023
- John Henderson – Elected 2025

=== Coaches ===
- Robert Neyland – Elected 1956
- Bowden Wyatt – Elected 1997
- Doug Dickey – Elected 2003
- Phillip Fulmer – Elected 2012

== Retired numbers ==
Tennessee has retired eight jersey numbers:

Tennessee Volunteers retired numbers
No.	Player	Pos.	Tenure	No. ret.	Ref.
16	Peyton Manning	QB	1994–1997	2005	
32	Billy Nowling (Note: Died in service during World War II. They were honored as "Vol Legends" prior to a game against the Air Force Falcons on September 9, 2006.)	FB	1940–1942	1946	
45	Johnny Majors	HB	1954–1956	2012	
49	Rudy Klarer	G	1941–1942	1946	
61	Willis Tucker	FB	1939–1940	1946	
62	Clyde Fuson	FB	1942	1946	
91	Doug Atkins	DE	1950–1952	2005	
92	Reggie White	DT	1980–1983	2005	

== Individual award winners ==
=== Players ===
- Maxwell Award

Peyton Manning – 1997

- Davey O'Brien Award

Peyton Manning – 1997

- Johnny Unitas Golden Arm Award

Peyton Manning – 1997

- Outland Trophy

Steve DeLong – 1964
John Henderson – 2000

- Draddy Trophy

Peyton Manning – 1997
Michael Munoz – 2004

- Jim Thorpe Award

Eric Berry – 2009

- Fred Biletnikoff Award

Jalin Hyatt – 2022

=== Coach ===
- The Home Depot Coach of the Year Award

Phillip Fulmer – 1998

- Eddie Robinson Coach of the Year

Phillip Fulmer – 1998

- Broyles Award

David Cutcliffe – 1998

- American Football Coaches Association Assistant Coach of the Year

John Chavis – 2006

- Robert R. Neyland Award

Phillip Fulmer – 2009

== Past and present NFL players ==
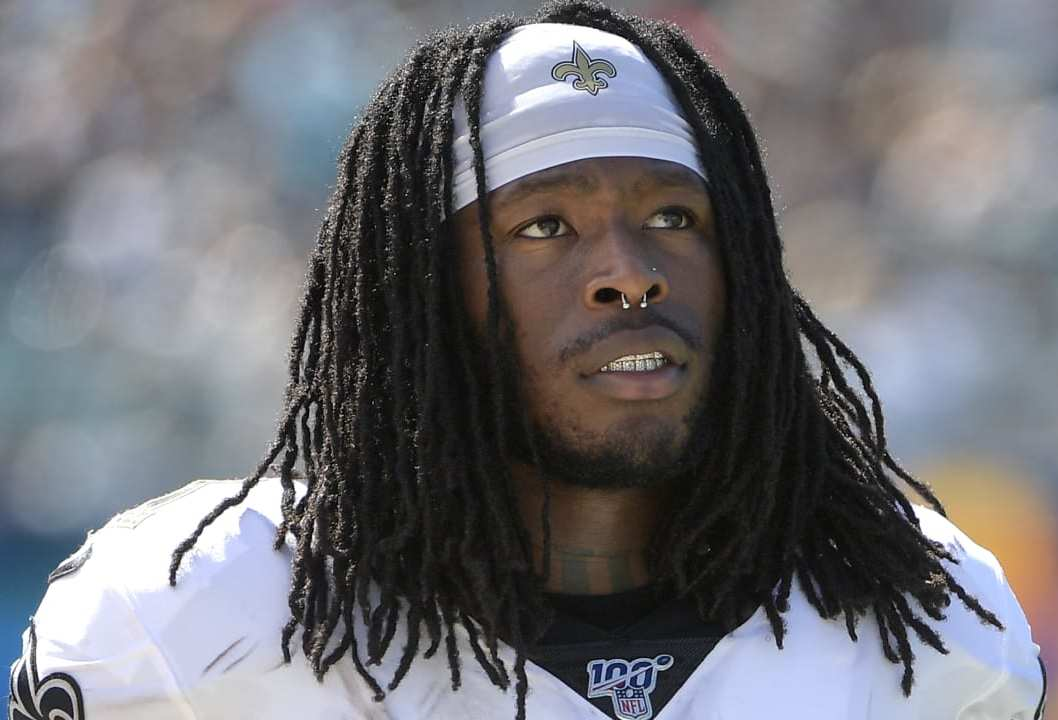
RB Alvin Kamara (2015–16)

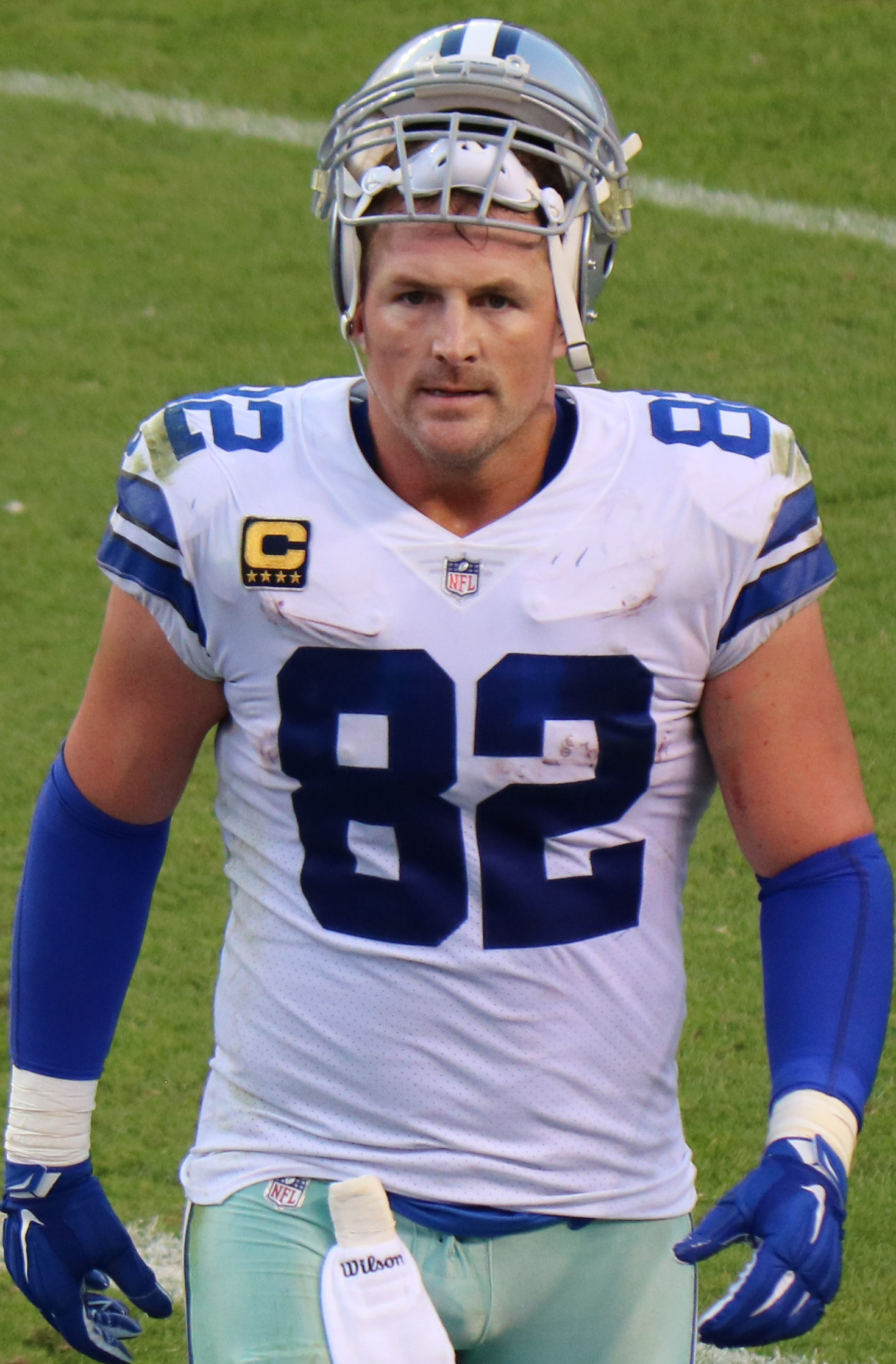
TE Jason Witten (2000–02)

- Micah Abernathy, safety for the Green Bay Packers and Atlanta Falcons
- Bill Anderson, tight end for the Washington Redskins and Green Bay Packers
- Erik Ainge, quarterback for the New York Jets
- Jason Allen, defensive back for the Miami Dolphins
- Pete Athas, cornerback for the New York Giants, Cleveland Browns, Minnesota Vikings, and New Orleans Saints
- Doug Atkins, former Defensive end for the Cleveland Browns, Chicago Bears, and New Orleans Saints 4× First-team All-Pro selection (1958, 1960, 1961, 1963), 6× Second-team All-Pro selection (1957, 1959, 1962, 1964, 1965, 1968), 8× Pro Bowl selection (1957, 1958, 1959, 1960,1961, 1962, 1963, 1965)
- Rashad Baker, defensive back for the Philadelphia Eagles
- Derek Barnett, defensive end for the Philadelphia Eagles, Super Bowl Champion (LII), PFWA All-Rookie Team (2017)
- Ben Bartholomew, former running back for the New England Patriots
- Bill Bates, former defensive back for the Dallas Cowboys, Pro Bowl selection (1984)All-Pro selection (1984) 3x Super Bowl champion (1992, 1993, 1995)
- Eric Berry, strong safety for the Kansas City Chiefs 2× Pro Bowl selection (2010, 2012)
- Art Brandau, lineman for the Pittsburgh Steelers.
- Jonathan Brown, former DE for Green Bay Packers, Saint Louis Rams and Denver Broncos
- John Bruhin, guard for the Tampa Bay Buccaneers
- Shawn Bryson, former running back for the Buffalo Bills and Detroit Lions
- Kevin Burnett, linebacker for the Dallas Cowboys, San Diego Chargers, Miami Dolphins, Oakland Raiders.
- Shane Burton, former defensive lineman for the Miami Dolphins 1996–1998, Chicago Bears 1999, New York Jets 2000–2001, Carolina Panthers 2002–2004, Super Bowl XXXVIII Carolina Panthers vs NE Patriots Blocked FG, NFL League Leader Batted Passes 1998, 2001, NFL Leader Blocked FGs 1997, 1998, 2001, 2003
- Dale Carter, former defensive back for the Kansas City Chiefs, 4× Pro Bowl selection (1994, 1995, 1996, 1997), 2× Second-Team All-Pro selection (1995, 1996), 1992 NFL Defensive Rookie of the Year
- Chad Clifton, offensive tackle for the Green Bay Packers, Pro Bowl selection (2007)
- Reggie Cobb, former running back for the Tampa Bay Buccaneers, Green Bay Packers, Jacksonville Jaguars, and New York Jets
- Justin Coleman, cornerback currently for the Seattle Seahawks, has played for the Minnesota Vikings, New England Patriots, Detroit Lions, and the Miami Dolphins, Super Bowl champion LI
- Britton Colquitt, punter for the Denver Broncos
- Craig Colquitt, former punter for the Pittsburgh Steelers and Indianapolis Colts
- Dustin Colquitt, punter for the Pittsburgh Steelers
- Jimmy Colquitt, former punter for the Seattle Seahawks
- Trevor Daniel, punter for the Houston Texans and Tennessee Titans
- Antone Davis, offensive lineman for the Philadelphia Eagles and Atlanta Falcons
- Joshua Dobbs, quarterback for the Minnesota Vikings
- Troy Fleming, former fullback for the Tennessee Titans
- Omar Gaither, linebacker for the Atlanta Falcons
- Scott Galyon, linebacker for the Miami Dolphins and New York Giants
- Willie Gault, former wide receiver for the Chicago Bears, Super Bowl Champion (1985)
- Deon Grant, defensive back for the Seattle Seahawks
- Jabari Greer, cornerback for the New Orleans Saints, Super Bowl Champion (2009)
- Shaun Ellis, defensive end for the New York Jets, 1× Pro Bowl selection (2003)
- Terry Fair, former defensive back for the Detroit Lions
- Arian Foster, running back for the Houston Texans, Undrafted 2009, 3× Pro Bowl selection (2010, 2011, 2012), 3x All-Pro selection (2010, 2011, 2012), NFL Rushing Title (2010)
- Aubrayo Franklin, nose tackle for the Indianapolis Colts
- Charlie Garner, former running back for the Philadelphia Eagles, San Francisco 49ers, Oakland Raiders, and Tampa Bay Buccaneers 1× Pro Bowl selection (2000)
- Glenn Glass, defensive back for the Pittsburgh Steelers, Philadelphia Eagles, Atlanta Falcons and Denver Broncos
- Anthony Hancock, wide receiver for the Kansas City Chiefs
- Chris Hannon, wide receiver for the Carolina Panthers
- Parys Haralson, linebacker for the New Orleans Saints
- Montario Hardesty, running back for the Cleveland Browns
- Darryl Hardy, linebacker for several NFL teams
- Alvin Harper, former wide receiver for the Dallas Cowboys, 2x Super Bowl Champion (1992 1993)
- Justin Harrell, defensive tackle for the Green Bay Packers
- Albert Haynesworth, defensive tackle for the Tampa Bay Buccaneers, 2× All-Pro selection (2007, 2008), 2× Pro Bowl selection (2007, 2008)
- Tracy Hayworth, linebacker for the Detroit Lions
- John Henderson, defensive tackle for the Jacksonville Jaguars, 2× Pro Bowl selection (2004, 2006), 1× All-Pro selection (2006)
- Travis Henry, running back for the Denver Broncos, Pro Bowl selection (2002) Former running back for the Buffalo Bills
- Anthony Herrera, guard for the Minnesota Vikings
- Cedric Houston, running back for the New York Jets
- A. J. Johnson (linebacker), Linebacker for the Denver Broncos
- Mark Jones, wide receiver for the Carolina Panthers
- Alvin Kamara, running back for the New Orleans Saints, 1x Pro Bowl selection (2017), Second Team All-Pro (2017), AP NFL Offensive Rookie of the Year(2017), Pepsi NFL Rookie of the Year (2017), PFWA All-Rookie Team (2017)
- Jamal Lewis, former running back for the Baltimore Ravens and the Cleveland Browns, Super Bowl champion (XXXV), Pro Bowl selection (2003), AP NFL Offensive Player of the Year (2003), NFL 2000s All-Decade Team
- Leonard Little, defensive end for the St. Louis Rams, Super Bowl champion (XXXIV), All-Pro selection (2003), 2x Pro Bowl selection (2003, 2006)
- Jesse Mahelona, defensive tackle for the Jacksonville Jaguars
- Bobby Majors, defensive back for the Cleveland Browns
- Peyton Manning, former quarterback for the Denver Broncos, Drafted 1st Overall 1998 by the Indianapolis Colts, 13× Pro Bowl selection (1999, 2000, 2002, 2003, 2004, 2005, 2006, 2007, 2008, 2009, 2010, 2012, 2013), 7× First-team All-Pro selection (2003, 2004, 2005, 2008, 2009, 2012, 2013), 3× Second-team All-Pro selection (1999, 2000, 2006), 5× AP NFL MVP (2003, 2004, 2008, 2009, 2013), 2× Super Bowl Champion (2006, 2015), NFL 2000s All-Decade Team
- David Martin, tight end for the Miami Dolphins Former tight end for the Green Bay Packers
- Tee Martin, former quarterback for the Oakland Raiders and Pittsburgh Steelers
- Jerod Mayo, linebacker for the New England Patriots, Draft 10th Overall 2008 & won NFL Defensive Rookie of the Year, 1x First-team All-Pro selection (2010)
- Turk McBride, defensive end for the Kansas City Chiefs
- Ron McCartney, middle linebacker for the Los Angeles Rams and Atlanta Falcons.
- Jacques McClendon, offensive line for the Detroit Lions
- Terry McDaniel, cornerback for the LA/Oakland Raiders and the Seattle Seahawks, 5x Pro Bowl Selection (1992, 1993, 1994, 1995, 1996), and 4x All-Pro selection (1992, 1993, 1994, 1995)
- Raleigh McKenzie, former offensive guard for the Washington Redskins, All-NFL Team (1991), Super Bowl Champion (1987, 1991)
- Robert Meachem, wide receiver for the New Orleans Saints, Super Bowl Champion 2009
- Art Mergenthal, guard for the Cleveland/Los Angeles Rams
- Marvin Mitchell, linebacker for the New Orleans Saints, Super Bowl Champion 2009
- Denarius Moore, wide receiver for the Oakland Raiders
- Stanley Morgan, former wide receiver for the New England Patriots, 4× Pro Bowl selection (1979, 1980, 1986, 1987)
- McDonald Oden, former tight end for the Cleveland Browns
- Eric Parker, former wide receiver for the San Diego Chargers
- Cordarrelle Patterson, wide receiver for the Minnesota Vikings, 1× Pro Bowl selection (2013), Oakland Raiders, New England Patriots, Chicago Bears, & currently the Atlanta Falcons
- Carl Pickens, former wide receiver for the Cincinnati Bengals and Tennessee Titans, 2x Pro Bowl selection (1995, 1996), 1992 NFL Offensive Rookie of the Year
- Peerless Price, former wide receiver for the Buffalo Bills, Atlanta Falcons, and Dallas Cowboys, Pro Bowl alternate (2002)
- Craig Puki, former linebacker for the San Francisco 49ers and St. Louis Cardinals
- Jalen Reeves-Maybin, Linebacker for the Detroit Lions
- Fuad Reveiz, placekicker for the Miami Dolphins, San Diego Chargers, and Minnesota Vikings
- Jack "Hacksaw" Reynolds, linebacker for the Los Angeles Rams, 2x Pro Bowl Selection, Super Bowl Champion (1981, 1984)
- Arron Sears, former guard for the Tampa Bay Buccaneers, 2007 NFL All-Rookie team
- Heath Shuler, former quarterback for the Washington Redskins and New Orleans Saints
- JT Smith, former safety for the Phoenix Cardinals
- Donté Stallworth, wide receiver for the Cleveland Browns and former wide receiver for the New Orleans Saints, Philadelphia Eagles, and New England Patriots
- Haskel Stanback, former running back for the Atlanta Falcons
- Travis Stephens, former running back for the Tampa Bay Buccaneers
- James Stewart, former running back for the Jacksonville Jaguars and Detroit Lions
- Luke Stocker, tight end for the Tampa Bay Buccaneers
- Bob Suffridge, guard, was drafted by the Pittsburgh Steelers and played for the Philadelphia Eagles and the Steagles
- Cameron Sutton, defensive back for the Detroit Lions
- Trey Teague, former center for the Denver Broncos and Buffalo Bills, Super Bowl Champion (1998)
- Raynoch Thompson, former linebacker for the Arizona Cardinals
- Jonathan Wade, defensive back for the St. Louis Rams
- Darwin Walker, defensive tackle for the Carolina Panthers and former Chicago Bears
- Kelley Washington, wide receiver for the Baltimore Ravens
- Fred Weary, guard for the Houston Texans
- Scott Wells, center for the St. Louis Rams
- Eric Westmoreland, former linebacker for the Jacksonville Jaguars
- Reggie White, former defensive lineman for the Philadelphia Eagles, Green Bay Packers, and the Carolina Panthers, 13× Pro Bowl selection (1986, 1987, 1988, 1989, 1990, 1991, 1992, 1993, 1994, 1995, 1996, 1997, 1998), 10× First-Team All-Pro selection (1986, 1987, 1988, 1989, 1990, 1991, 1992, 1993, 1995, 1998), 3× Second-Team All-Pro selection (1994, 1996, 1997), Super Bowl champion (XXXI), 2× NFL Defensive Player of the Year (1987, 1998)
- Ron Widby, former punter for the Dallas Cowboys and Green Bay Packers, 2x Pro Bowl selection (1969, 1971)
- Billy Williams, former wide receiver for the St. Louis Rams
- Jordan Williams, former defensive end for the NY Giants
- Al Wilson, former linebacker for the Denver Broncos, 5× Pro Bowl selection (2001, 2002, 2003, 2005, 2006), 2× All-Pro selection (2005, 2006)
- Cedrick Wilson, former wide receiver for the Pittsburgh Steelers, Super Bowl champion (XL)
- Gibril Wilson, defensive back for the Miami Dolphins, Super Bowl champion (XLII)
- Jason Witten, tight end for the Dallas Cowboys, 7× Pro Bowl selection (2004, 2005, 2006, 2007, 2008, 2009, 2010), All-Pro selection (2007, 2008, 2010), 2× NFL Alumni Tight End of the Year (2007, 2010)

== Future opponents ==
=== Conference opponents ===
From 1992 to 2023, Tennessee played in the East Division of the SEC and played each opponent in the division each year along with several teams from the West Division. In 2024, the SEC expanded the conference to 16 teams and eliminated its two divisions, causing a new scheduling format for the Volunteers to play against the other members of the conference. After initially only releasing the 2024 schedule, the 2025 schedule was announced at SEC Media Days where the teams will play the same opponents in 2025 that they are scheduled to play in 2024, with sites changed for equal home and away competition over the course of the two seasons, while the conference still considers a new format for the future.

==== 2025 Conference Schedule ====
Opponent	Site	Result
at Alabama	Bryant Denny Stadium; Tuscaloosa, AL (Third Saturday in October)	
Arkansas	Neyland Stadium; Knoxville, TN	
at Florida	Ben Hill Griffin Stadium; Gainesville, FL (rivalry)	
Georgia	Neyland Stadium; Knoxville, TN (rivalry)	
at Kentucky	Kroger Field; Lexington, KY (rivalry)	
at Mississippi State	Davis Wade Stadium; Starkville, MS	
Oklahoma	Neyland Stadium; Knoxville, TN	
Vanderbilt	Neyland Stadium; Knoxville, TN (rivalry)	

=== Non-conference opponents ===
Announced schedules as of September 23, 2026.

2027	2028	2029	2030	2031
Georgia Tech	vs. West Virginia (Charlotte)	Washington	UT Martin	Austin Peay
Tennessee State	Central Michigan	Chattanooga	at Washington	
Western Michigan	Chattanooga	Bowling Green	Ohio	
