= Travis Stephens =

American football player (born 1978)

No. 36
- Position: Running back

Personal information
- Born: June 26, 1978 (age 48); Clarksville, Tennessee, U.S.
- Listed height: 5 ft 8 in (1.73 m)
- Listed weight: 194 lb (88 kg)

Career information
- High school: Northeast (Clarksville)
- College: Tennessee
- NFL draft: 2002: 4th round, 119th overall pick

Career history
- Tampa Bay Buccaneers (2002); Carolina Panthers (2003)*; Tampa Bay Buccaneers (2003)*; Houston Texans (2003-2004)*
- * Offseason or practice squad member only

Awards and highlights
- Super Bowl champion (XXXVII); BCS national champion (1998); First-team All-American (2001); First-team All-SEC (2001)

Career NFL statistics
- Receptions: 1
- Receiving yards: 6
- Touchdowns: 0
- Stats at Pro Football Reference

Travis Tremaine Stephens (born June 26, 1978) is an American former professional football player who was a running back in the National Football League (NFL). He played college football for the Tennessee Volunteers, earning first-team All-American after setting the school's single-season record for rushing yards (1,464) in 2001. He played one season in the NFL for the Tampa Bay Buccaneers after being selected by the team in the fourth round of the 2002 NFL draft.

== Early life ==
Stephens attended Northeast High School in Clarksville, Tennessee. He played football for Northeast. He was a three-year starter at wingback and tailback on offense and linebacker and safety on defense. He rushed for a school-record 2,550 yards and 23 touchdowns in his junior season. In addition, he recorded 87 tackles and two interceptions as a free safety on defense. As a senior, he rushed for 991 yards and eight touchdowns despite having to deal with an ankle injury. Stephens committed to the University of Tennessee to play college football under head coach Phillip Fulmer.

== College career ==
=== 1997 season ===
In Stephens's freshman season with the Volunteers, he was part of a strong backfield that contained Jamal Lewis and Shawn Bryson. On the season, he recorded nine rushes for 36 yards. In the 1998 Orange Bowl loss to Nebraska, Stephens did not record any statistics but did appear late in the game. Tennessee scored a touchdown late and on the two-point conversion, Stephens caught a pass from quarterback Tee Martin in the fourth quarter.

=== 1998 season ===
In Stephens's sophomore season, he saw more work despite being in a crowded backfield with Travis Henry, Jamal Lewis, and Shawn Bryson. He would record 107 rushes for 477 yards and four touchdowns. In addition, he had two receptions for three yards in regular season play. Tennessee completed an undefeated 13–0 season in the 1998 season. The season culminated in the Fiesta Bowl where the Volunteers defeated the Florida State Seminoles by a score of 23–16. In the National Championship, Stephens had 13 carries for 60 yards.

=== 1999 season ===
Stephens was redshirted in the 1999 season due to continued trend of a crowded backfield. With Stephens redshirting, Jamal Lewis and Travis Henry did most of the rushing for the Volunteers in 1999.

=== 2000 season ===
As a redshirt junior, Stephens entered the 2000 season with Travis Henry to form a solid combination of running backs for the 8–4 Volunteers. On the season, he had 81 carries for 359 yards and seven touchdowns in regular season play. In addition, he had six receptions for 28 yards in regular season play.

=== 2001 season ===
In his redshirt senior season, Stephens was the number one running back for the 11–2 Volunteers. On the season, he had 291 rushes for a single-season school-record 1,464 yards and ten touchdowns. In addition, he had 19 receptions for 169 yards and one touchdown in regular season play. In the 2002 Florida Citrus Bowl, Stephens had 16 carries for 38 yards, one rushing touchdown, and one reception for 19 yards in the 45–17 victory over the Michigan Wolverines. He earned All-American honors for the 2001 season.

In his collegiate career at Tennessee, Stephens had 488 rushes for 2,338 yards and 21 touchdowns in regular season play. In addition, he recorded 27 receptions for 200 yards and one touchdown in regular season play.

=== Statistics ===
Travis Stephens			Rushing				Receiving			
Year	School	Conference	Rushing	Rushing Yards	Average	Touchdowns	Receiving	Receiving Yards	Average	Touchdowns
1997	Tennessee	SEC	9	36	4.0	0	0	0	0	0
1998	Tennessee	SEC	107	477	4.5	4	2	3	1.5	0
2000	Tennessee	SEC	81	359	4.4	7	6	28	4.7	0
2001	Tennessee	SEC	291	1,464	5.0	10	19	169	8.9	1
Career			488	2,336	4.8	21	27	200	7.4	1

== Professional career ==
Pre-draft measurables
Height	Weight	Arm length	Hand span	40-yard dash	10-yard split	20-yard split	Vertical jump	Broad jump	Bench press
5 ft 8 1/8 in (1.73 m)	194 lb (88 kg)	29 3/4 in (0.76 m)	8 3/4 in (0.22 m)	4.56 s	1.70 s	2.73 s	32.0 in (0.81 m)	10 ft 1 in (3.07 m)	15 reps
All values from NFL Combine

=== Tampa Bay Buccaneers ===
Stephens was selected by the Tampa Bay Buccaneers in the fourth round with the 119th overall pick in the 2002 NFL draft. In a game against the New Orleans Saints on September 8, he had one reception for six yards. His one reception would be his only meaningful recorded statistic in his NFL career. He was considered part of the team when they won Super Bowl XXXVII over the Oakland Raiders. Stephens was released from the Buccaneers before the 2003 season.

=== Houston Texans ===
The Houston Texans signed Stephens to a futures contract before the 2004 season. He was eventually allocated to NFL Europe and placed on their exempt/injured list. After this stint with the Texans, Stephens' professional career ended.

== Personal life ==
Since his days as a football player, Stephens has continued to stay in the game. In 2017, he helped out with youth football camps in Jackson, Tennessee with some other Tennessee alumni.
