= 1998 Tennessee Volunteers football team =

American college football season

1998 Tennessee Volunteers football

Consensus national champion SEC champion SEC Eastern Division champion Fiesta Bowl champion

SEC Championship Game, W 24–14 vs. Mississippi State

Fiesta Bowl (BCS NCG), W 23–16 vs. Florida State
- Conference: Southeastern Conference
- Eastern Division

Ranking
- Coaches: No. 1
- AP: No. 1
- Record: 13–0 (8–0 SEC)
- Head coach: Phillip Fulmer (6th season)
- Offensive coordinator: David Cutcliffe (6th season)
- Offensive scheme: Pro-style
- Defensive coordinator: John Chavis (4th season)
- Base defense: Multiple 4–3
- Captains: Shawn Bryson; Jeff Hall; Mercedes Hamilton; Al Wilson
- Home stadium: Neyland Stadium

1998 Southeastern Conference football standings
	Conf.			Overall
Team	W		L	W		L
Eastern Division
No. 1 Tennessee x$#	8	–	0	13	–	0
No. 5 Florida %	7	–	1	10	–	2
No. 14 Georgia	6	–	2	9	–	3
Kentucky	4	–	4	7	–	5
Vanderbilt	1	–	7	2	–	9
South Carolina	0	–	8	1	–	10
Western Division
Mississippi State xy	6	–	2	8	–	5
No. 16 Arkansas x	6	–	2	9	–	3
Alabama	4	–	4	7	–	5
Ole Miss	3	–	5	7	–	5
LSU	2	–	6	4	–	7
Auburn	1	–	7	3	–	8
Championship: Tennessee 24, Mississippi State 14
# – BCS National Champion; $ – BCS representative as conference champion; % – BCS at-large representative; x – Division champion/co-champions; y – Championship game participant; Rankings from AP Poll

The 1998 Tennessee Volunteers football team represented the University of Tennessee as a member of the Eastern Division of the Southeastern Conference (SEC) during the 1998 NCAA Division I-A football season. Led by sixth-year head coach Phillip Fulmer, the Volunteers compiled an overall record of 13–0 with a mark of 8–0, winning the SEC's Eastern Division title. Tennessee advanced to the SEC Championship Game, where the Volunteers defeated Mississippi State to secure the conference championship. Tennessee was then invited to the Fiesta Bowl, the inaugural BCS National Championship Game, where the Volunteers defeated Florida State to the program's second undisputed national title, and sixth overall. The team played home games at Neyland Stadium in Knoxville, Tennessee.

Tennessee was expected to have a slight fall-off after their conference championship the previous season. They had lost quarterback Peyton Manning, wide receiver Marcus Nash, and linebacker Leonard Little to the National Football League (NFL). Manning was the first pick overall in the 1998 NFL draft. Tennessee was also coming off a difficult 42–17 loss to Nebraska in the Orange Bowl, and were in the midst of a five-game losing streak to the rival Florida Gators. Nonetheless, the Volunteers beat eight bowl teams, including six January bowl teams, four top-ten teams, and three Bowl Championship Series (BCS) bowl-bound teams, and completed the program's first undefeated season in 60 years.

== Schedule ==
Date	Time	Opponent	Rank	Site	TV	Result	Attendance	Source
September 5	12:00 pm	at No. 17 Syracuse*	No. 10	Carrier Dome; Syracuse, NY	ESPN	W 34–33	49,550	
September 19	8:00 pm	No. 2 Florida	No. 6	Neyland Stadium; Knoxville, TN (rivalry)	CBS	W 20–17 ^{OT}	107,653	
September 26	7:00 pm	Houston*	No. 4	Neyland Stadium; Knoxville, TN	PPV	W 42–7	106,417	
October 3	3:30 pm	at Auburn	No. 3	Jordan-Hare Stadium; Auburn, AL (rivalry)	CBS	W 17–9	85,214	
October 10	3:30 pm	at No. 7 Georgia	No. 4	Sanford Stadium; Athens, GA (rivalry, College GameDay)	CBS	W 22–3	86,117	
October 24	3:30 pm	Alabama	No. 3	Neyland Stadium; Knoxville, TN (Third Saturday in October)	CBS	W 35–18	107,289	
October 31	12:30 pm	at South Carolina	No. 3	Williams–Brice Stadium; Columbia, SC	JPS	W 49–14	69,523	
November 7	4:00 pm	UAB*^{†}	No. 2	Neyland Stadium; Knoxville, TN	PPV	W 37–13	106,508	
November 14	3:30 pm	No. 10 Arkansas	No. 1	Neyland Stadium; Knoxville, TN	CBS	W 28–24	106,365	
November 21	3:30 pm	Kentucky	No. 1	Neyland Stadium; Knoxville, TN (rivalry)	CBS	W 59–21	107,252	
November 28	3:30 pm	at Vanderbilt	No. 1	Vanderbilt Stadium; Nashville, TN (rivalry)	ESPN2; JPS	W 41–0	41,600	
December 5	8:00 pm	vs. No. 23 Mississippi State*	No. 1	Georgia Dome; Atlanta, GA (SEC Championship Game)	ABC	W 24–14	74,795	
January 4	8:00 pm	vs. No. 2 Florida State*	No. 1	Sun Devil Stadium; Tempe, AZ (Fiesta Bowl)	ABC	W 23–16	80,470	
*Non-conference game; ^{†}Homecoming; Rankings from AP Poll released prior to the game; All times are in Eastern time

== Rankings ==
Ranking movements Legend: ██ Increase in ranking ██ Decrease in ranking т = Tied with team above or below ( ) = First-place votes
	Week															
Poll	Pre	1	2	3	4	5	6	7	8	9	10	11	12	13	14	Final
AP	10	8	6	4 (2)	3 (2)	4	3 (3)	3 (3)	3 (3)	2 (3)	1 (46)	1 (37)	1 (42)	1 (41)	1 (70)	1 (70)
Coaches Poll	10	7	6	4	5	5	4	4	4 (1)	3 (2)	1T (25)	2 (18½)	2 (22½)	2 (24½)	1 (60)	1 (62)
BCS	Not released								3	2	1	1	1	1	1	Not released

== Game summaries ==
=== at No. 17 Syracuse ===
Game One – No. 10 Tennessee Volunteers (0–0) at No. 17 Syracuse Orangemen (0–0) – Game summary

Quarter	1	2	3	4	Total
No. 10 Volunteers	7	7	10	10	34
No. 17 Orangemen	0	10	3	20	33

at Carrier Dome • Syracuse, New York

- Date: September 5, 1998
- Game time: 12 Noon EDT
- Game attendance: 49,550
- Referee: Steve Shaw (SEC)
- TV announcers (ESPN): Dave Barnett (play-by-play), Bill Curry (color commentator) and Dave Ryan (sideline reporter)

Game information

First Quarter

- (06:38) TENN –

Second quarter

- (09:49) SYR –
- (00:53) TENN –
- (00:00) SYR –

Third quarter

- (08:29) SYR –
- (05:28) TENN –
- (03:15) TENN –

Fourth quarter

- (12:13) SYR –
- (09:49) SYR –
- (08:29) TENN –
- (06:39) SYR –
- (02:38) SYR –
- (00:00) TENN –

Statistics	TENN	SYR
First downs		
Total yards		
Rushing yards		
Passing yards		
Passing: Comp–Att–Int		
Time of possession		

Team	Category	Player	Statistics
Tennessee	Passing		
Tennessee	Rushing		
Tennessee	Receiving		
Syracuse	Passing		
Syracuse	Rushing		
Syracuse	Receiving		

Tennessee kicker Jeff Hall converted a 27-yard field goal as time expired to give the Vols a key road win. This was the second game winning kick of Hall's career, the first coming against Georgia in the 1995 season.. In his first game as a starter, replacing Peyton Manning, quarterback Tee Martin went only 9-of-26 for 143 yards, but led the Vols into field goal range for the game-winning kick. Running back Jamal Lewis led the Vols with 140 yards rushing and a touchdown. Wide receiver Peerless Price had two touchdown receptions.

Syracuse quarterback Donovan McNabb gave the Volunteer defense fits, putting up 300 yards with a 22-for-28 day.

=== No. 2 Florida ===
Game Two – No. 2 Florida Gators (2–0) vs No. 6 Tennessee Volunteers (1–0)

Quarter	1	2	3	4	OT	Total
No. 2 Gators	3	7	7	0	0	17
No. 6 Volunteers	7	3	7	0	3	20

at Neyland Stadium • Knoxville, Tennessee

- Date: September 19, 1998
- Game time: 8:00 p.m. EDT
- Game attendance: 107,653
- Referee: Bill Goss (SEC)
- TV announcers (CBS): Sean McDonough (play-by-play), Terry Donahue (color commentator) and Mike Mayock (sideline reporter)

Game information

First Quarter

- (05:54) FLA –
- (04:52) TENN –

Second Quarter

- (07:12) TENN –
- (00:20) FLA –

Third Quarter

- (07:36) TENN –
- (05:18) FLA –

Fourth Quarter

No scoring plays

Overtime

- (00:00) TENN –

Statistics	FLA	TENN
First downs		
Total yards		
Rushing yards		
Passing yards		
Passing: Comp–Att–Int		
Time of possession		

Team	Category	Player	Statistics
Florida	Passing		
Florida	Rushing		
Florida	Receiving		
Tennessee	Passing		
Tennessee	Rushing		
Tennessee	Receiving		

Tennessee broke a five-game losing streak against the Gators. Florida kicker Collins Cooper missed a potential game-tying field in overtime and set off a wild celebration at Neyland Stadium that saw the goalposts and CBS cameras disappear. The Vols won despite racking up only 235 yards of total offense and going 2 for 13 on third down conversions. The difference was turnovers. The Florida Gators lost four fumbles, and one interception, with three of the fumbles caused by Al Wilson. Jeff Hall made his field goal in the first overtime, setting the stage for the Florida miss and the Vols win. The Vols also held the Gators to −13 net rushing on 30 attempts. Fullback Shawn Bryson scored on a 57-yard run.

=== Houston ===
Game Three – Houston Cougars (0–3) vs No. 4 Tennessee Volunteers (2–0)

Quarter	1	2	3	4	Total
Cougars	0	0	7	0	7
No. 4 Volunteers	7	14	7	14	42

at Neyland Stadium • Knoxville, Tennessee

- Date: September 26, 1998
- Game time: 7:00 p.m. EDT
- Game attendance: 106,417
- Referee: Al Ford (SEC)
- TV announcers (PPV): Bob Bell (play-by-play) and Tim Priest (color commentator)

Game information

First Quarter

- (09:33) TENN –

Second Quarter

- (14:52) TENN –
- (10:09) TENN –

Third Quarter

- (11:05) HOU –
- (07:36) TENN –

Fourth Quarter

- (10:56) TENN –
- (06:35) TENN –

Statistics	HOU	TENN
First downs		
Total yards		
Rushing yards		
Passing yards		
Passing: Comp–Att–Int		
Time of possession		

Team	Category	Player	Statistics
Houston	Passing		
Houston	Rushing		
Houston	Receiving		
Tennessee	Passing		
Tennessee	Rushing		
Tennessee	Receiving		

Junior quarterback Tee Martin threw for four touchdowns and 234 yards en route to the Vols win over the Houston Cougars. Jamal Lewis recorded 135 rushing yards and one touchdown. The Vols recorded 334 rushing yards and 589 total yards as a team. The Vols defense held Houston to 239 total yards and recorded three sacks with eight tackles for loss.

=== Auburn ===
	1	2	3	4	Total
No. 3 Tennessee	17	0	0	0	17
Auburn	0	3	3	3	9

The Vols jumped out to an early lead behind the running of Jamal Lewis. However, following a season ending ACL injury, Lewis left the game and the Tennessee defense held on for the 17–9 win.

In a rematch of the high scoring 1997 SEC Championship Game, the defense needed a score by defensive end Shaun Ellis and a four-play goal line stand from inside the one-yard line to secure the win. They did so without senior captain Al Wilson, who missed the game with a shoulder injury.

=== Georgia ===
	1	2	3	4	Total
No. 4 Tennessee	3	6	13	0	22
No. 7 Georgia	3	0	0	0	3

Tennessee entered their third game in the 1998 SEC season as underdogs. However, behind the running of Travis Henry and Travis Stephens, and a strong defensive effort, the Vols dominated the Bulldogs.

Georgia was limited to only 254 total yards and the Vols defense held their opponent without a touchdown for the second straight game.

=== Alabama ===
	1	2	3	4	Total
Alabama	3	0	8	7	18
No. 3 Tennessee	7	7	7	14	35

The Vols pushed their winning streak over Alabama in the Third Saturday in October to four games with a 35–18 victory. The win gave Tennessee a 6–0 record for the first time since 1969.

This time, the Vols Offense relied on Travis Henry who rushed for 113 yards and 2 touchdowns. The play that broke the game open for the Vols was a 100-yard kickoff return by Peerless Price in the 3rd quarter that answered an Alabama touchdown and two-point conversion.

=== South Carolina ===
	1	2	3	4	Total
No. 3 Tennessee	7	14	21	7	49
South Carolina	0	0	0	14	14

Tee Martin set an NCAA record for consecutive completions with 24, leading the Vols to a 49–14 victory. Martin completed his first 23 passes (with one from the previous game) to set the record. He also recorded his first 300-yard passing game by going 23-for-24 for 315 yards and 4 touchdowns.

The Vol Defense held South Carolina scoreless until the 4th quarter, when they had a 42–0 lead.

=== UAB ===
	1	2	3	4	Total
UAB	0	3	3	7	13
No. 2 Tennessee	10	14	10	3	37

Tennessee took care of the Blazers to win their homecoming contest and move their record to 8–0. It was their first 8–0 start since 1956. The Vols racked up 447 total yards, led by the rushing of Travis Henry and the passing of Tee Martin. WR Peerless Price also added 103 yards receiving.

=== Arkansas ===
	1	2	3	4	Total
No. 10 Arkansas	7	14	3	0	24
No. 1 Tennessee	0	10	10	8	28

Tennessee fell behind 21–3 in the first half, but capped off a season-saving comeback with a Travis Henry touchdown run in the final seconds.

Henry had 197 yards rushing and the deciding touchdown. The key play of the game and possibly the season occurred in the fourth quarter. Arkansas was nursing a 24–22 lead late in the game and was attempting to run out the clock. Defensive tackle Billy Ratliff pushed Arkansas guard Brandon Burlsworth into quarterback Clint Stoerner, causing him to stumble and fumble. Ratliff recovered the ball and allowed Tennessee the chance to drive the field and score the game-winning touchdown.

=== vs. Kentucky ===
Game Ten – Kentucky Wildcats (7–3) vs No. 1 Tennessee Volunteers (9–0)

Quarter	1	2	3	4	Total
Wildcats	7	0	7	7	21
No. 1 Volunteers	14	24	14	7	59

at Neyland Stadium • Knoxville, Tennessee

- Date: November 21, 1998
- Game time: 3:30 p.m. EST
- Game attendance: 107,252
- Referee: Aster Sizemore (SEC)
- TV announcers (CBS): Sean McDonough (play-by-play), Terry Donahue (color commentator) and Mike Mayock (sideline reporter)

Game information

First Quarter

- (11:05) TENN –
- (07:09) TENN –
- (04:56) UK –
- (01:09) TENN –

Second Quarter

- (12:11) TENN –
- (09:28) TENN –
- (06:16) TENN –
- (00:16) TENN –

Third Quarter

- (10:02) UK –
- (07:03) TENN –
- (00:00) TENN –

Fourth Quarter

- (08:41) TENN –
- (04:16) UK –

Statistics	UK	TENN
First downs		
Total yards		
Rushing yards		
Passing yards		
Passing: Comp–Att–Int		
Time of possession		

Team	Category	Player	Statistics
Kentucky	Passing		
Kentucky	Rushing		
Kentucky	Receiving		
Tennessee	Passing		
Tennessee	Rushing		
Tennessee	Receiving		

Kentucky struggled after one of their players died and another was injured in an automobile accident early that week, as Tennessee picked up an easy 59–21 win. This game marked the end of the Battle of the Beer Barrel, due to the alcohol-related death that week.

Kentucky QB Tim Couch passed for 337 yards and 2 touchdowns, but Kentucky never threatened after the 1st quarter

=== at Vanderbilt ===
Game Eleven – No. 1 Tennessee Volunteers (10–0) at Vanderbilt Commodores (2–8) – Game summary

Quarter	1	2	3	4	Total
No. 1 Volunteers	3	17	7	14	41
Commodores	0	0	0	0	0

at Vanderbilt Stadium • Nashville, Tennessee

- Date: November 28, 1998
- Game time: 3:30 p.m. EST
- Game attendance: 41,600
- Referee: Rom Gilbert (SEC)
- TV announcers (ESPN2 – National / JP Sports – Regional): Rich Waltz (play-by-play, ESPN2) and Rod Gilmore (color commentator, ESPN2) / Bob Kesling (play-by-play, JP Sports), Dave Rowe (color commentator, JP Sports) and David Logan (sideline reporter, JP Sports)

Game information

First Quarter

- (06:56) TENN –

Second Quarter

- (09:08) TENN –
- (03:57) TENN –
- (00:55) TENN –

Third Quarter

- (14:04) TENN –

Fourth Quarter

- (09:34) TENN –
- (06:34) TENN –

Statistics	TENN	VAN
First downs		
Total yards		
Rushing yards		
Passing yards		
Passing: Comp–Att–Int		
Time of possession		

Team	Category	Player	Statistics
Tennessee	Passing		
Tennessee	Rushing		
Tennessee	Receiving		
Vanderbilt	Passing		
Vanderbilt	Rushing		
Vanderbilt	Receiving		

The Vols clinched their second consecutive SEC East Division title with a win in Nashville. Tennessee dominated once again, holding the Commodores scoreless and limiting them to 174 total yards.

Tee Martin had 241 yards passing and one touchdown, while Travis Henry led the team in rushing with 136 yards and a touchdown. Peerless Price added 181 yards receiving and a touchdown.

=== vs. No. 23 Mississippi State (SEC Championship Game) ===
1998 SEC Championship Game
No. 23 Mississippi State Bulldogs (8–3) vs. No. 1 Tennessee Volunteers (11–0) – Game summary

Quarter	1	2	3	4	Total
No. 23 Bulldogs	7	0	0	7	14
No. 1 Volunteers	0	10	0	14	24

at Georgia Dome • Atlanta, Georgia

- Date: December 5, 1998
- Game time: 8:00 p.m. EST
- Game attendance: 74,795
- Referee: Steve Shaw (SEC)
- TV announcers (ABC): Keith Jackson (play-by-play), Bob Griese (color commentator) and Lynn Swann (sideline reporter)

Game information

First Quarter

- (00:05) MSU –

Second Quarter

- (09:32) TENN –
- (05:09) TENN –

Third Quarter

No scoring plays

Fourth Quarter

- (08:43) MSU –
- (06:15) TENN –
- (05:47) TENN –

Statistics	MSU	TENN
First downs		
Total yards		
Rushing yards		
Passing yards		
Passing: Comp–Att–Int		
Time of possession		

Team	Category	Player	Statistics
Mississippi State	Passing		
Mississippi State	Rushing		
Mississippi State	Receiving		
Tennessee	Passing		
Tennessee	Rushing		
Tennessee	Receiving		

Tennessee won its second SEC title, in a defensive struggle. The Vols were held to 249 total yards and scored 3 touchdowns. They were down late in the 4th quarter 14–10, but scored two touchdowns within 32 seconds of each other on passes by Tee Martin. This win secured a berth into the National Championship game for the Vols.

=== vs. No. 2 Florida State (Tostitos Fiesta Bowl) ===
1999 Tostitos Fiesta Bowl
No. 2 Florida State Seminoles (11–1) vs. No. 1 Tennessee Volunteers (12–0) – Game summary

Quarter	1	2	3	4	Total
No. 2 Seminoles	0	9	0	7	16
No. 1 Volunteers	0	14	0	9	23

at Sun Devil Stadium • Tempe, Arizona

- Date: January 4, 1999
- Game time: 8:00 p.m. EST
- Game attendance: 80,470
- Referee: Bill Richardson (PAC-10)
- TV announcers (ABC): Keith Jackson (play-by-play), Bob Griese (color commentator) and Lynn Swann (sideline reporter)

Game information

First Quarter

No scoring plays

Second Quarter

- (14:05) TENN –
- (13:40) TENN –
- (08:59) FSU –
- (01:17) FSU –

Third Quarter

No scoring plays

Fourth Quarter

- (09:17) TENN –
- (06:01) TENN –
- (03:42) FSU –

Statistics	FSU	TENN
First downs		
Total yards		
Rushing yards		
Passing yards		
Passing: Comp–Att–Int		
Time of possession		

Team	Category	Player	Statistics
Florida State	Passing		
Florida State	Rushing		
Florida State	Receiving		
Tennessee	Passing		
Tennessee	Rushing		
Tennessee	Receiving		

Tennessee won its first consensus national championship since 1951 and the first ever BCS title game by defeating the Seminoles 23–16. The second ranked Seminoles were favored and boasted superstar WR Peter Warrick. The Vols limited Warrick to 1 catch for 7 yards and scored on long passes to Peerless Price and an interception return by CB Dwayne Goodrich, who was the defensive MVP of the game. Price had 199 yards receiving on 4 catches and scored the deciding touchdown in the 4th quarter.

LB Al Wilson led the defense with 9 tackles.

== Roster ==
1998 Tennessee Volunteers football team roster
Players
Coaches
Offense

Pos.	#	Name	Class
RB	28	Myles Atherton	Sr
RB	45	Will Bartholomew	Fr
RB	47	Kurston Biggers	Fr
RB	24	Shawn Bryson	Sr
G	53	Toby Champion	So
OT	67	Chad Clifton	Jr
OT	52	Cosey Coleman	So
OT	71	Reggie Coleman	Fr
QB	6	Jeremaine Copeland	Sr
RB	21	Phil Crosby	Jr
TE	82	Eric Diogu	Jr
RB	33	Derrick Edmonds	Jr
TE	96	John Finlayson	Fr
G	74	Bernard Gooden	So
WR	11	Bobby Graham	Fr
WR	83	Tyrone Graham	So
RB	20	Travis Henry	So
TE	84	Neil Johnson	So
WR	88	Jermaine Kent	Fr
RB	19	Mark Levine	Sr
RB	31	Jamal Lewis	So
WR	87	David Martin	So
QB	17	Tee Martin	Jr
G	69	Ethan Massa	So
QB	8	Joey Mathews	Fr
WR	80	Eric Parker	Fr
QB	9	Josh Plemons	So
WR	37	Peerless Price	Sr
OT	72	Jarvis Reado	GS
G	54	Diron Robinson	Sr
RB	25	Travis Stephens	So
RB	28	Dominique Stevenson	So
WR	9	Kevin Taylor	Fr
OT	77	Josh Tucker	Jr
QB	5	Burney Veazey	Fr
WR	14	Cedrick Wilson Sr.	So
QB	2	Tom Windle	So

Defense

Pos.	#	Name	Class
LB	38	Roger Alexander	Jr
DB	29	Mikki Allen	Jr
LB	47	Matt Blankenship	Jr
DB	21	Travis Brown	Sr
DE	94	Ed Butler	Fr
DS	63	Josh Campbell	Jr
DE	92	Jeff Coleman	Sr
DE	93	Shaun Ellis	Jr
DB	36	Maurice Fitzgerald	Fr
DT	60	Matt Goodin	Sr
DB	23	Dwayne Goodrich	Jr
DB	7	Deon Grant	So
DT	55	Ron Green	Sr
DS	52	Kevin Gregory	Jr
DB	18	Gerald Griffin	Jr
DT	99	Mercedes Hamilton	Sr
LB	48	Jerrod Hayden	So
LB	56	Bernard Jackson	Fr
LB	39	Andre James	Fr
LB	35	Shawn Johnson	Jr
DB	34	Steve Johnson	GS
LB	44	Austin Kemp	So
DE	99	DeAngelo Lloyd	So
DB	30	Andre Lott	So
LB	98	Antron Peebles	Sr
LB	41	Chris Ramseur	So
DE	40	Billy Ratliff	Jr
DE	97	Joe Reid	Fr
DT	68	Spencer Riley	Jr
DE	76	Justin Satterfield	Fr
DB	15	Tim Sewell	Sr
DT	89	Kenny Smith	So
LB	56	Thomas Stallworth	Fr
LB	45	Jonathan Sweet	Jr
DE	22	Corey Terry	Sr
LB	46	Raynoch Thompson	Jr
DE	58	Darwin Walker	Jr
DT	95	Fred Weary	Fr
LB	42	Eric Westmoreland	So
DB	2	Fred White	Jr
LB	27	Al Wilson	Sr

Special teams

Pos.	#	Name	Class
PK	4	Jeff Hall	Sr
P	38	Bill Hurst	Sr
P	43	David Leaverton	So
PK	31	Robert Loudermilk	Jr
H	10	Benson Scott	Sr

Head coach

- Phillip Fulmer

Coordinators/assistant coaches

- David Cutcliffe – Offensive coordinator/assistant head coach/quarterbacks
- Randy Sanders – Running backs/recruiting coordinator
- Pat Washington – Wide receivers
- Mark Bradley – Tight ends/assistant offensive line
- Mike Barry – Offensive line
- John Chavis – Defensive coordinator/linebackers
- Dan Brooks – Defensive line
- Kevin Ramsey – Defensive backs
- Steve Caldwell – Special teams/defensive ends
- Kurt Roper – Graduate assistant

Legend

- (C) Team captain
- (S) Suspended
- (I) Ineligible
- Injured
- Redshirt

== Local radio ==
Vol Network
Flagship Station	Play-by-play	Color commentator	Sideline reporter	Studio host	Studio analyst
WNOX–AM 990; WVIK-FM 107.7	John Ward	Bill Anderson	–	–	–

== Statistics ==
- QB Tee Martin: 164/285 (57.5%) for 2,442 yards (8.57) with 21 touchdowns vs. 8 interceptions (2.81%). 113 carries for 306 yards (2.71) and 7 touchdowns.
- RB Travis Henry: 195 carries for 998 yards (5.12) and 7 touchdowns. 5 catches for 40 yards and no touchdowns.
- RB Travis Stephens: 120 carries for 537 yards (4.48) and 4 touchdowns.
- RB/FB Shawn Bryson: 24 carries for 207 yards (8.63) and 4 touchdowns. 22 catches for 201 yards and 2 touchdowns.
- RB Jamal Lewis: 73 carries for 497 yards (6.81) and 3 touchdowns.
- WR Peerless Price: 65 catches for 1,119 yards (17.22) and 11 touchdowns.
- WR Cedrick Wilson: 34 catches for 565 yards (16.62) and 6 touchdowns.
- WR Jeremaine Copeland: 29 catches for 455 yards (15.69) and 1 touchdown.

== Honors ==
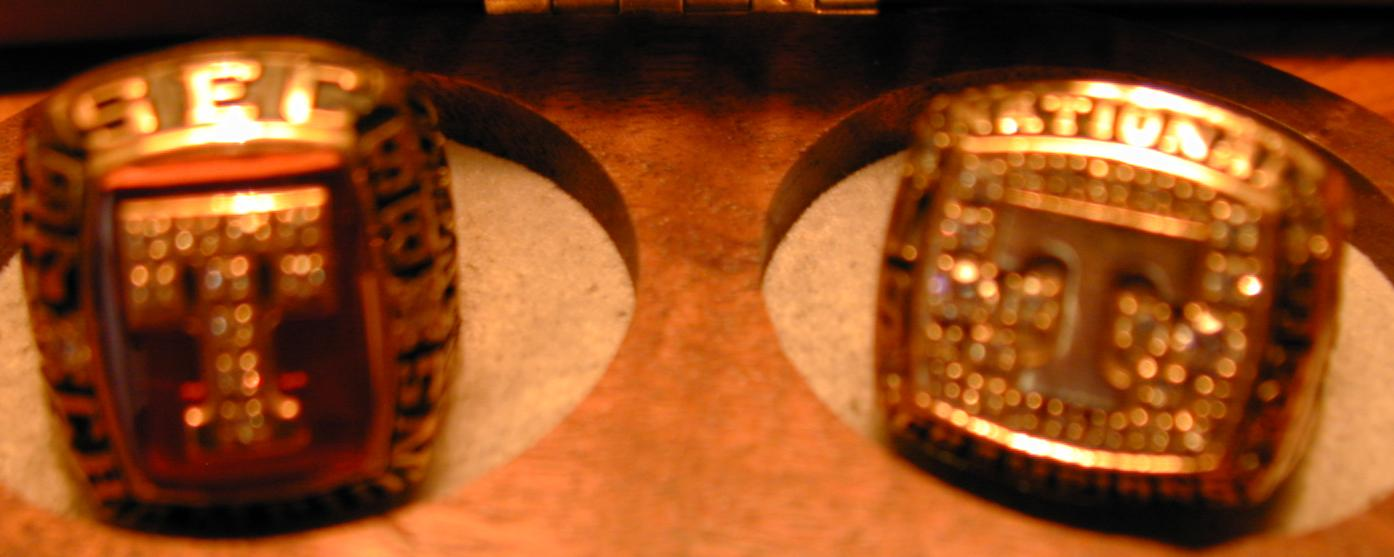
SEC and National Championship rings for the 1998 Tennessee Vols

- Phillip Fulmer:

- Eddie Robinson Award
- The Home Depot Coach of the Year Award
- SEC Coach of the Year
- AFCA Coach of the Year

- David Cutcliffe:

- Broyles Award

- Al Wilson:

- Birmingham Quarterback Club – Most Outstanding SEC Lineman
- AP, AFCA, and FWAA 1st team All American
- 'Football News', AP and Coaches 1st team All SEC

- Raynoch Thompson:

- AP 3rd team All American
- 'Football News', AP and Coaches 1st team All SEC

- Chad Clifton:

- 'Football News' 1st team All SEC
- AP and Coaches 2nd team All SEC

- Cosey Coleman

- AP 1st team All SEC
- Coaches 2nd team All SEC

- Dwayne Goodrich

- AP and Coaches 2nd team All SEC

- Jeff Hall

- 'Football News', AP and Coaches 1st team All SEC

- Peerless Price

- AP and Coaches 2nd team All SEC

- Darwin Walker

- AP 1st team All SEC
- Coaches 2nd team All SEC

== Team players drafted into the NFL ==
The Tennessee Volunteers had six players selected in the 1999 NFL draft.

Player	Position	Round	Pick	NFL club
Al Wilson	Linebacker	1	31	Denver Broncos
Peerless Price	Wide receiver	2	53	Buffalo Bills
Shawn Bryson	Running back	3	86	Buffalo Bills
Steve Johnson	Cornerback	6	170	Seattle Seahawks
Jeff Hall	Kicker	6	181	Washington Redskins
Corey Terry	Defensive end	7	250	Indianapolis Colts
