= Shaun Ellis =

American football player (born 1977)

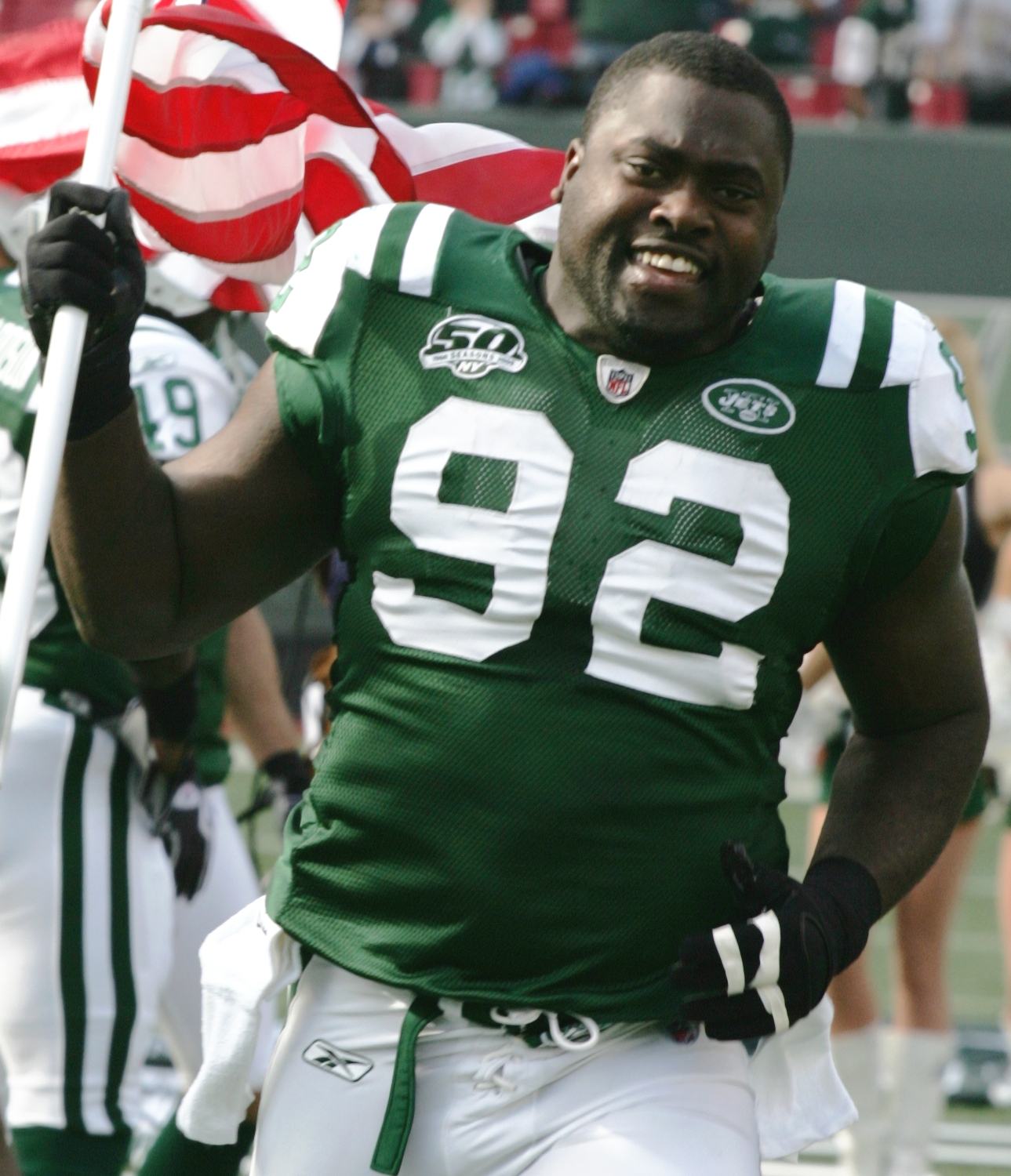
- Ellis with the New York Jets in 2009

No. 92
- Position: Defensive end

Personal information
- Born: June 24, 1977 (age 49); Anderson, South Carolina, U.S.
- Listed height: 6 ft 5 in (1.96 m)
- Listed weight: 290 lb (132 kg)

Career information
- High school: Westside (Anderson)
- College: Tennessee
- NFL draft: 2000: 1st round, 12th overall pick

Career history
- New York Jets (2000–2010); New England Patriots (2011)

Awards and highlights
- 2× Pro Bowl (2003, 2009); BCS national champion (1998); First-team All-SEC (1999)

Career NFL statistics
- Total tackles: 566
- Sacks: 73.5
- Pass deflections: 16
- Forced fumbles: 13
- Interceptions: 1
- Stats at Pro Football Reference

MeShaunda Pizarrur Ellis (born June 24, 1977), nicknamed "Big Katt", is an American former professional football player who was a defensive end who spent the majority of his career with the New York Jets of the National Football League (NFL). He played college football for the Tennessee Volunteers. Ellis was selected by the Jets in the first round of the 2000 NFL draft with the 12th overall pick. He also played for the New England Patriots. He was a two-time Pro Bowl selection.

== College career ==
Ellis enrolled in the University of Tennessee, where he was a stand-out defensive end for the Tennessee Volunteers football team under head coach Phillip Fulmer. In the 1998 season, he was part of the undefeated Volunteers team that won the National Championship over Florida State in the Fiesta Bowl in Tempe, Arizona. At the end of his collegiate career, he had 105 tackles, 12.5 sacks, three forced fumbles, a fumble recovery, and one interception which he returned for 90 yards to score a touchdown.

== Professional career ==
Pre-draft measurables
Height	Weight
6 ft 4 3/8 in (1.94 m)	280 lb (127 kg)
All values from NFL Combine

=== New York Jets (2000–2010) ===
Ellis was selected by the New York Jets in the first round with the 12th overall pick in the 2000 NFL draft. He was the first of four first round draft picks that the Jets had that year, and was the compensation pick from the New England Patriots for hiring Bill Belichick away from the Jets as their head coach. The other players drafted were defensive end John Abraham (13th overall), quarterback Chad Pennington (18th overall), and tight end Anthony Becht (27th overall).

Ellis was an immediate impact player. In his rookie season, he recorded 8.5 sacks, 67 total tackles (50 solo), one interception, three passes defended, and one forced fumble. Only defensive end Hugh Douglas, with 10 sacks in the 1995 season, ranks higher in Jets history for most sacks by a rookie. After 2001 and 2002 campaigns which saw his overall numbers drop, Ellis rebounded in the 2003 season with 12.5 sacks. Ellis earned a Pro Bowl nomination for the 2003 season. Ellis followed up his 2003 season with 11 sacks, 57 total tackles (39 solo), four passes defended, and two forced fumbles. in 2004. In Week 17 of the 2004 season, he recorded three sacks in the final game of the 2004 regular season against the St. Louis Rams. Ellis anchored a strong Jets run defense which contributed to a 10–6 season and a Wild Card berth.

In the 2005 season, Ellis appeared in and started 13 games. He finished with 2.5 sacks, 38 total tackles (31 solo), and one forced fumble. In the 2006 season, Ellis appeared in and started 16 games. He finished with five sacks, 58 total tackles (37 solo), three passes defended, and one forced fumble.

In Week 11 of the 2007 season, Ellis earned AFC Defensive Player of the Week against the Pittsburgh Steelers. He had two sacks, one forced fumble, and a fumble recovery in the 19–16 win. In the 2007 season, Ellis had five sacks, 49 total tackles (33 solo), and one forced fumble in 16 games and starts.

In Week 15 of the 2008 season, in a home game against their AFC East divisional rival Buffalo Bills, Ellis recovered a fumble from quarterback J. P. Losman and ran it for a touchdown in the final two minutes, giving the Jets the lead and the eventual 31–27 win. On December 23, Ellis was fined $10,000 for tossing snow at opposing fans when the Jets played the Seattle Seahawks at Qwest Field the previous Sunday. Ellis claimed that it was "all in good fun." He finished the 2008 season with eight sacks, 60 total tackles (41 solo), and two forced fumbles.

In 2009, Ellis became the longest tenured player on the Jets roster. Under new head coach Rex Ryan, Ellis helped lead the Jets to the postseason where the Jets made the AFC Championship for the first time in 11 years but lost to the Indianapolis Colts by a score of 30–17. He finished the 2009 season with 6.5 sacks, 53 total tackles (35 solo), one pass defended, and one forced fumble. He earned a second career Pro Bowl nomination for his performance in the 2009 season. He was a replacement for Indianapolis Colts defensive end Robert Mathis, who was playing in the Super Bowl.

In the 2010 season, Ellis finished with 4.5 sacks, 36 total tackles, one pass defended, and one forced fumble in 15 games and starts. Ellis had two sacks in the Divisional Round victory over the New England Patriots. The Jets advanced to the AFC Championship for the second consecutive season in 2010. The team lost to the Pittsburgh Steelers by a score of 24–19.

=== New England Patriots (2011) ===
Ellis signed with the New England Patriots on August 7, 2011, ending his 11-year tenure with the New York Jets. During the 2011 season, Ellis played in 14 games with 14 total tackles and one sack. The Patriots finished the regular season with a 13–3 record and advanced to Super Bowl XLVI, which was Ellis's first career trip to the Super Bowl. The Patriots lost to the Giants by a score of 21–17. Ellis was not re-signed by the Patriots following the season.

=== Free agency and retirement ===
Ellis spent most of the 2012 season on free agency and eventually retired from professional football.

== NFL career statistics ==
Legend
**Bold**	Career high

Year	Team	GP	Cmb	Solo	Ast	Sck	FF	FR	Yds	Int	Yds	Avg	Lng	TD	PD
2000	NYJ	16	53	39	14	8.5	1	**2**	0	**1**	**1**	**1.0**	**1**	0	3
2001	NYJ	16	39	27	12	5.0	1	0	0	0	0	0.0	0	0	2
2002	NYJ	16	40	30	10	4.0	1	0	0	0	0	0.0	0	0	**4**
2003	NYJ	16	**69**	**47**	**22**	**12.5**	1	0	0	0	0	0.0	0	0	0
2004	NYJ	15	57	38	19	11.0	**2**	1	0	0	0	0.0	0	0	3
2005	NYJ	13	38	30	8	2.5	1	0	0	0	0	0.0	0	0	0
2006	NYJ	16	58	37	21	5.0	1	0	0	0	0	0.0	0	0	3
2007	NYJ	16	49	32	17	5.0	1	1	0	0	0	0.0	0	0	0
2008	NYJ	16	60	41	19	8.0	**2**	1	0	0	0	0.0	0	0	0
2009	NYJ	15	53	35	18	6.5	1	0	**1**	0	0	0.0	0	0	0
2010	NYJ	15	36	26	10	4.5	1	0	0	0	0	0.0	0	0	1
2011	NE	14	14	7	7	1.0	0	0	0	0	0	0.0	0	0	0
Career		184	566	389	177	73.5	13	5	0	1	1	1.0	1	0	16
