= 1998 Orange Bowl =

1998 FedEx Orange Bowl
- 64th Orange Bowl "Battle by the Beach"; Bowl Alliance National Championship
| Tennessee Volunteers | Nebraska Cornhuskers |
| (11–1) | (12–0) |
| SEC | Big 12 |
| 17 | 42 |
| Head coach: Phillip Fulmer | Head coach: Tom Osborne |
| AP / Coaches / BA; 3 / 3 / 3 | AP / Coaches / BA; 2 / 2 / 2 |
| | 1 | 2 | 3 | 4 | Total |
|---|---|---|---|---|---|
| Tennessee | 0 | 3 | 6 | 8 | 17 |
| Nebraska | 7 | 7 | 21 | 7 | 42 |
- Date: January 2, 1998
- Season: 1997
- Stadium: Pro Player Stadium
- Location: Miami, Florida
- MVP: Ahman Green (RB, Nebraska) & Jamal Lewis (RB, Tennessee)
- Favorite: Nebraska by 7½ points (57)
- Referee: Terry McAulay (ACC)
- Attendance: 74,002

United States TV coverage
- Network: CBS
- Announcers: Sean McDonough and Terry Donahue
- Nielsen ratings: 13.3

The 1998 Orange Bowl was played on January 2, 1998, and served as the Bowl Alliance's designated national championship game for the 1997 season. This 64th edition of the Orange Bowl featured the Nebraska Cornhuskers of the Big 12 Conference and the Tennessee Volunteers of the Southeastern Conference (SEC).

== Teams ==
While this was the designated national championship game, it featured the No. 2 and No. 3 ranked teams, per the AP Poll. The top-ranked Michigan Wolverines were not a participant, as the Big Ten champion was still contractually obligated to appear in the Rose Bowl against the Pac-10 champion. The next season, the Bowl Championship Series (BCS) was formed, allowing the Big Ten and Pac-10 champions to participate in bowl games other than the Rose Bowl.

=== Tennessee Volunteers ===
Tennessee came into the game with an 11–1 record and the No. 3 ranking. The Volunteers had finished their regular season with a 10–1 record, their only loss having been to Florida. Tennessee then defeated Auburn in the SEC title game on December 6.

=== Nebraska Cornhuskers ===
Nebraska came into the game with a 12–0 record and the No. 2 ranking. The Cornhuskers were 11–0 through the regular season, then defeated Texas A&M in the Big 12 title game on December 6.

== Game summary ==
Nebraska opened up a 7–0 lead after the first quarter and led 14–3 lead at halftime. The Huskers put the game away in the opening drive of the third quarter via their power running game, driving the opening kickoff for a touchdown to push the lead to 21–3. Nebraska's lead jumped to 28–3 after a touchdown run by quarterback Scott Frost. Tennessee quarterback Peyton Manning fired a 5-yard touchdown pass to wide receiver Peerless Price to cut the lead to 28–9. The ensuing two-point conversion failed and the lead remained at 19. Nebraska then drove 59 yards in three plays, before running back Ahman Green scored on a 22-yard touchdown run to move the lead up to 35–9 going into the fourth quarter.

Frost added a 9-yard touchdown run in the fourth quarter to put the game away for Nebraska at 42–9 with under five minutes remaining. Tennessee's back-up quarterback Tee Martin threw a touchdown pass in the final minute, and the ensuing two-point conversion was successful, closing the final margin to 42–17.

Nebraska's Green was named game MVP after rushing for an Orange Bowl record 201 yards and two touchdowns. In his final game at Tennessee, Manning completed 21-of-31 attempts for only 131 yards passing. The game was also the last for Nebraska head coach Tom Osborne, who had been at the helm since 1973 (and with the Husker program since 1962).

== Box score ==
| Quarter | Time | Team | Detail | NU | TEN |
|---|---|---|---|---|---|
| 1 | 1:10 | NU | Ahman Green 1-yd rush (Kris Brown kick) | 7 | 0 |
| 2 | 11:28 | NU | Shelvin Wiggins 10-yd rush (Kris Brown kick) | 14 | 0 |
| 2 | 8:28 | TEN | Jeff Hall 44-yd field goal | 14 | 3 |
| 3 | 10:11 | NU | Scott Frost 1-yd rush (Kris Brown kick) | 21 | 3 |
| 3 | 5:07 | NU | Scott Frost 11-yd rush (Kris Brown kick) | 28 | 3 |
| 3 | 1:58 | TEN | Peerless Price 5-yd pass from Peyton Manning | 28 | 9 |
| 3 | 0:29 | NU | Ahman Green 22-yd rush (Kris Brown kick) | 35 | 9 |
| 4 | 4:24 | NU | Scott Frost 9-yd rush (Kris Brown kick) | 42 | 9 |
| 4 | 0:58 | TEN | Andy McCullough 3-yd pass from Tee Martin (Travis Stephens pass from Tee Martin) | 42 | 17 |

== Aftermath ==
Nebraska was ranked second in the final AP Poll, behind the also-undefeated Rose Bowl champion Michigan Wolverines. The Cornhuskers did win a share of the national championship, capturing the top spot in the Coaches Poll and receiving the AFCA National Championship Trophy.

Tennessee finished at 11–2; this was the last loss by the Volunteers until September 18, 1999.

Nebraska and Tennessee met exactly two years later, in the 2000 Fiesta Bowl.

Referee Terry McAulay was hired by the NFL for the 1998 season as a side judge. After working three seasons at that position, he was promoted to referee in 2001 and was a crew chief for 16 seasons. He was the referee for Super Bowl XXXIX, Super Bowl XLIII and Super Bowl XLVIII.
