= Travis Henry =

American football player (born 1978)

No. 20
- Position: Running back

Personal information
- Born: October 29, 1978 (age 48); Frostproof, Florida, U.S.
- Listed height: 5 ft 9 in (1.75 m)
- Listed weight: 230 lb (104 kg)

Career information
- High school: Frostproof
- College: Tennessee (1997–2000)
- NFL draft: 2001: 2nd round, 58th overall pick

Career history
- Buffalo Bills (2001–2004); Tennessee Titans (2005–2006); Denver Broncos (2007)

Awards and highlights
- Pro Bowl (2002); BCS national champion (1998); First-team All-SEC (2000)

Career NFL statistics
- Rushing attempts: 1,488
- Rushing yards: 6,086
- Rushing touchdowns: 38
- Receptions: 141
- Receiving yards: 951
- Receiving touchdowns: 2
- Stats at Pro Football Reference

Travis Deion Henry (born October 29, 1978) is an American former professional football player who was a running back for seven seasons in the National Football League (NFL). He played college football for the Tennessee Volunteers. He was selected by the Buffalo Bills in the second round of the 2001 NFL draft, and also played for the Tennessee Titans and Denver Broncos. He was a Pro Bowl selection in 2002.

== Early life ==
Henry was a Parade All-American and "Mr. Florida Football" as a running back at Frostproof Middle-Senior High School. As a senior for the Bulldogs football team, he rushed for 4,087 yards (breaking the national single-season record of 4,045 yards set by Ken Hall of Sugar Land, Tx in 1953) and 42 touchdowns in 14 games. His team was state runner-up that year, to the Union County Tigers. In addition to football, Henry played basketball and ran track.

== College career ==
Henry attended the University of Tennessee from 1997 to 2000. While at Tennessee, he played college football under Volunteers head coach Phillip Fulmer.

=== 1997 season ===
Henry did not play much in his freshman season due to a very crowded and talented backfield, which contained future NFL running backs Jamal Lewis and Shawn Bryson. He recorded two rushes for four yards on the season.

=== 1998 season ===
In his sophomore season, Henry was a member of the 1998 National Championship team. In regular season play, he made 176 rushing attempts for 970 yards and four touchdowns as well as four receptions for 31 yards. In the National Championship game against Florida State played at the Fiesta Bowl, Henry had 19 rushes for 28 yards and one reception for nine yards in the 23–16 win.

=== 1999 season ===
In the 1999 season, Henry continued to share the backfield with fellow running back Jamal Lewis and collected 125 carries for 790 yards and eight touchdowns.

=== 2000 season ===
In Henry's senior season, in which he rushed 253 times for 1,314 yards and 11 touchdowns, he was named first-team All-SEC by the Associated Press and the Sporting News.

Henry holds the school records for yards rushing (3,078), rushing attempts (556), and 100-yard performances (15). He was nicknamed "Cheese" by his strength and conditioning coach for being as tough and strong as a block of government cheese.

== Professional career ==
=== 2001 NFL draft ===
Henry was drafted in the second round with the 58th overall pick in the 2001 NFL draft by the Buffalo Bills.

Pre-draft measurables
| Height | Weight | Arm length | Hand span | 40-yard dash | 10-yard split | 20-yard split | Vertical jump | Bench press | Wonderlic |
|---|---|---|---|---|---|---|---|---|---|
| 5 ft 9 1/8 in (1.76 m) | 223 lb (101 kg) | 30 in (0.76 m) | 8 in (0.20 m) | 4.61 s | 1.62 s | 2.67 s | 35.5 in (0.90 m) | 23 reps | 9 |
All values from NFL Combine

=== Buffalo Bills ===
With the Buffalo Bills, Henry became the fourth-leading rusher in franchise history, with 3,849 yards and 27 touchdowns with a 4.0 yards per carry average.

==== 2001 season ====
Henry made his professional debut in Week 1 against the New Orleans Saints. He started the game and had 22 carries for 58 rushing yards in the 24–6 loss. In the following game, a 42–26 loss to the Indianapolis Colts, he scored his first professional touchdown on a four-yard rush. In Week 4, against the New York Jets, he had 19 carries for 113 rushing yards in the 42–36 loss. In Week 13, against the Carolina Panthers, he had 157 scrimmage yards in the 25–24 victory. He finished his rookie season with 213 carries for 729 rushing yards and four rushing touchdowns to go along with 22 receptions for 179 receiving yards in 13 games. He finished fourth among rookies in rushing yards.

==== 2002 season ====
Henry started out the 2002 season strong with 31 carries for 149 rushing yards and three rushing touchdowns in the 37–31 loss to the New York Jets. In Week 4, against the Chicago Bears, he scored his first receiving touchdown in the NFL on a 26-yard reception from Drew Bledsoe to win the 33–27 game in overtime. In Week 6, against the Houston Texans, he had 28 carries for 159 rushing yards and two rushing touchdowns in the 31–24 victory. He earned AFC Offensive Player of the Week for his game against Houston. He followed the Houston game up with 22 carries for 132 rushing yards in a 23–10 victory over the Miami Dolphins. In Week 11, against the Kansas City Chiefs, he had 24 carries for 126 rushing yards in the 17–16 loss. In Week 13, against Miami, he had 35 carries for 151 rushing yards and a rushing touchdown in the 38–21 victory. In Week 15, against the San Diego Chargers, he had 22 carries for 144 rushing yards and two rushing touchdowns in the 20–13 victory. He earned a Pro Bowl nomination in 2002 after he collected 1,438 rushing yards and 13 rushing touchdowns. Henry finished fifth in franchise history in rushing yards for a single season.

==== 2003 season ====
Henry started the 2003 season with 126 scrimmage yards and two rushing touchdowns in a 31–0 victory over the New England Patriots in the season opener. In the next game, a 38–17 victory over the Jacksonville Jaguars, he had three rushing touchdowns. In Week 7, against Washington, he had 31 carries for 167 rushing yards and two rushing touchdowns in the 24–7 victory. In the following game, a 38–5 loss to the Kansas City Chiefs, he had 22 carries for 124 rushing yards. In Week 11, against the Houston Texans, he had 23 carries for 149 rushing yards in the 12–10 loss. In Week 13, against the New York Giants, he had 26 carries for 113 rushing yards and a rushing touchdown in the 24–7 victory. In the following game, Henry had 32 carries for 169 rushing yards and one rushing touchdown in a 17–6 victory over the New York Jets. He finished the 2003 season with 331 carries for 1,356 rushing yards and ten rushing touchdowns to go along with 28 catches for 158 receiving yards and one receiving touchdown in 15 games.

==== 2004 season ====
In the 2004 season, Henry was injured for the later part of the year and lost his starting job to the Bills' 2003 first round pick, Willis McGahee, in Week 8. He appeared in ten games and finished with 94 carries for 326 rushing yards. Henry refused to accept becoming McGahee's backup and demanded a trade. Buffalo conceded to his demand and traded him to the Tennessee Titans.

=== Tennessee Titans ===
In July 2005, Henry was dealt to the Tennessee Titans for a third round draft pick in 2006. Henry was suspended four games during the 2005 season for violating the NFL's substance abuse policy.

==== 2005 season ====
In the 2005 season, Henry was the backup to Chris Brown for his first season with the Titans. He appeared in ten games and started one. He recorded 88 carries for 335 rushing yards to go along with 13 receptions for 117 receiving yards in the 2005 season.

==== 2006 season ====
Henry secured the role of starter for the Titans beginning in Week 3 in the 2006 season. In Week 5, against the Indianapolis Colts, he had 19 carries for 123 rushing yards in the 14–13 loss. In the following game, a 25–22 victory over Washington, he had 32 carries for 178 rushing yards and a rushing touchdown. In Week 11, against the Philadelphia Eagles, he had 18 carries for 143 rushing yards and one rushing touchdown in the 31–13 victory. On December 3, 2006, Henry became the 100th running back in NFL history to rush for more than 5,000 career yards. On Christmas Eve in 2006, Henry broke the 1,000 yard mark for the 2006 NFL season against his former team, the Buffalo Bills. Henry played a significant role in the Titans' win as he rushed for 135 yards total. He finished the 2006 NFL season with 270 carries for 1,211 rushing yards at 4.5 yards per carry and seven rushing touchdowns. He got into the end zone seven times while only fumbling three times. In addition, he caught 22 passes for 179 yards, at an average of 8.1 yards per reception, giving him 1,282 all-purpose yards. Nevertheless, the Titans released him, which was seen as a cost-cutting move.

=== Denver Broncos ===
Not long after his release from the Titans, Henry signed with the Denver Broncos.

Henry started off the 2007 season strong before injuries would keep him in and out of the lineup throughout the remainder of the season. In the regular season opener against the Buffalo Bills, he had 183 scrimmage yards (139 rushing, 44 receiving) in the 15–14 victory. In the following game against the Oakland Raiders, he had 26 carries for 128 rushing yards in the 23–20 victory. Two games later, he had 26 carries for 131 rushing yards in the 38–20 loss to the Indianapolis Colts.

According to an article written by MyFOX Colorado, it was reported that Henry faced the possibility of being suspended for the remainder of the 2007 season for a positive marijuana test. At the time of the incident, both the Denver Broncos and the NFL refused to comment on the situation. Henry appealed the suspension and his case was taken to Federal courts, allowing him to play until a decision was made.

Following the breaking news of Henry's reported positive failure, Broncos head coach Mike Shanahan publicly supported Henry. This led to Shanahan being fined $25,000 by the NFL.

Henry won his appeal on December 4, 2007. Henry remained in the substance abuse program, but was not suspended. Henry stated the positive test result was due to second-hand smoke. Henry is reported as passing a lie detector test, as well as a hair follicle test regarding whether or not he smoked marijuana.

On February 21, 2008, Henry restructured his contract with the Broncos prior to his scheduled $6 million bonus to stay with the team. Henry had previously stated, "I want to make it right to the Broncos, the fans and myself," he said. "I want to be a Bronco and make it all right. I don't want to be anywhere else. I owe those people something for all that happened last year. I want to clear my name there. I'm so hungry to do right there."

On June 2, 2008, Henry was released from the Denver Broncos just one year into his five-year, $22.5 million deal. "We did not feel his commitment to the Broncos was enough to warrant a spot on this football team," said head coach Mike Shanahan in a prepared statement. "He's just too inconsistent as a person. I'm not going to get into details what he did do or didn't do. If you don't do the little things, obviously you can't count on somebody. So that's why he's released." At the time Henry was reported to be out of the country and had not yet participated in any Broncos off-season workouts.

On July 12, 2008, it was revealed that Henry had once again tested positive for marijuana and would be suspended for one year. The failed test was reportedly dated in May 2008, showing that he used marijuana five months after winning his appeal. The Broncos stated that the team was not aware of Henry's test results at the time he was released.

=== Suspension ===
On August 31, 2008, Henry was suspended for at least one year by the NFL for violating the league's substance abuse policy. He was reinstated by the NFL following his release from prison in August 2012.

== NFL career statistics ==
Legend
| **Bold** | Career high |

| Year | Team | Games | | Rushing | | | | | Receiving | | | | |
| Year | Team | GP | GS | Att | Yds | Avg | Lng | TD | Rec | Yds | Avg | Lng | TD |
|---|---|---|---|---|---|---|---|---|---|---|---|---|---|
| 2001 | BUF | 13 | 12 | 213 | 729 | 3.4 | 25 | 4 | 22 | 179 | 8.1 | 40 | 0 |
| 2002 | BUF | **16** | **16** | 325 | **1,438** | 4.4 | 34 | **13** | **43** | **309** | 7.2 | 26 | **1** |
| 2003 | BUF | 15 | 15 | **331** | 1,356 | 4.1 | 64 | 10 | 28 | 158 | 5.6 | 18 | **1** |
| 2004 | BUF | 10 | 5 | 94 | 326 | 3.5 | 19 | 0 | 10 | 45 | 4.5 | 10 | 0 |
| 2005 | TEN | 10 | 1 | 88 | 335 | 3.8 | 29 | 0 | 13 | 117 | 9.0 | **42** | 0 |
| 2006 | TEN | 14 | 13 | 270 | 1,211 | **4.5** | **70** | 7 | 18 | 78 | 4.3 | 12 | 0 |
| 2007 | DEN | 12 | 7 | 167 | 691 | 4.1 | 33 | 4 | 7 | 65 | **9.3** | 21 | 0 |
| Career | | 90 | 69 | 1,488 | 6,086 | 4.1 | 70 | 38 | 141 | 951 | 6.7 | 42 | 2 |

== Personal life ==
Henry was married once, at age 19, to a woman six years his senior; the marriage was later annulled. He was engaged in 2009, but no marriage has been reported as of January 2016. Henry has fathered at least 11 children by 10 different women (one of the women having twins).

Henry has had on-going problems making his child support payments to the mothers of nine of his children. He was arrested in Polk County, Florida, in March 2009 and charged with failing to pay $16,600 in child support. His lawyer estimates that he is obligated to pay at least $170,000 per year in child support payments.

== Drug trafficking arrest ==
On September 30, 2008, Henry was arrested by the DEA after allegedly being involved in a multi-kilogram cocaine transaction that occurred in Centennial, Colorado. Henry, portrayed by court documents "as the ruthless 'money guy' in a cocaine trafficking ring", faced ten years to life on federal drug trafficking charges. On March 31, 2009, Henry and prosecutors reached a plea agreement; a change-of-plea hearing was set for April 16 by the judge. The plea deal consisted of Henry accepting a charge of conspiracy to possess cocaine with intent to distribute. The maximum penalties included serving ten years to life in prison, and a fines of up to $4 million.

On July 15, 2009, Henry was sentenced to three years in federal prison for financing a cocaine trafficking operation. The fine was waived by the judge, who stated that the defendant (Henry) could not afford a fine. In addition, if Henry completed a drug program while in prison, his sentence could be reduced by one year. Henry was released from custody after two years.

On February 13, 2026, Henry was pardoned by President Donald Trump along with four other former NFL players.
