= Corey Terry =

American football player (born 1976)

Profile
- Position: Linebacker

Personal information
- Born: March 6, 1976 (age 50); Warrenton, North Carolina, U.S.
- Listed height: 6 ft 3 in (1.91 m)
- Listed weight: 246 lb (112 kg)

Career information
- College: Tennessee
- NFL draft: 1999: 7th round, 250th overall pick

Career history
- Indianapolis Colts (1999)*; Pittsburgh Steelers (1999)*; Jacksonville Jaguars (1999); Oakland Raiders (2000)*; New Orleans Saints (2000); Calgary Stampeders (2002)
- * Offseason or practice squad member only

Awards and highlights
- BCS national champion (1998)
- Stats at Pro Football Reference

Corey Terry (born March 6, 1976) is an American former professional football player who was a linebacker in the National Football League (NFL) for the Jacksonville Jaguars and New Orleans Saints from 1999 to 2000. He played college football for the Tennessee Volunteers and was originally selected in the seventh round of the 1999 NFL draft by the Indianapolis Colts with the 250th overall pick. He appeared in 15 games over two seasons.
