= Chad Clifton =

American football player (born 1976)

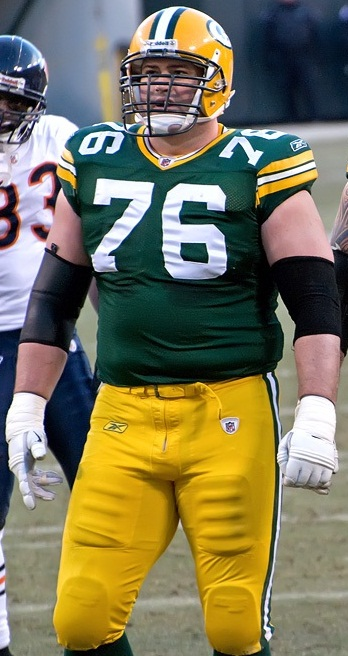
- Clifton with the Green Bay Packers in 2011

No. 76
- Position: Offensive tackle

Personal information
- Born: June 26, 1976 (age 50); Martin, Tennessee, U.S.
- Listed height: 6 ft 5 in (1.96 m)
- Listed weight: 320 lb (145 kg)

Career information
- High school: Westview (Martin)
- College: Tennessee (1995–1999)
- NFL draft: 2000: 2nd round, 44th overall pick

Career history
- Green Bay Packers (2000–2011)

Awards and highlights
- Super Bowl champion (XLV); 2× Pro Bowl (2007, 2010); Green Bay Packers Hall of Fame; National champion (1998); 2× Second-team All-SEC (1998, 1999)

Career NFL statistics
- Games played: 165
- Games started: 160
- Fumble recoveries: 1
- Stats at Pro Football Reference

Jeffrey Chad Clifton (born June 26, 1976) is an American former professional football player who was an offensive tackle for 12 seasons with the Green Bay Packers of the National Football League (NFL). He played college football for the Tennessee Volunteers and was selected by the Packers in the second round of the 2000 NFL draft. During his career, he was named to two Pro Bowls and was part of the team that won Super Bowl XLV over the Pittsburgh Steelers.

== Early life ==
Clifton was born in Martin, Tennessee. At Westview High School in Martin, Clifton was an all-around athlete. He lettered four times in football, starting his last three seasons as a two-way player. In addition to football, he was on the basketball team for three years. Throughout his high school years, Clifton played on the defensive tackle position and on tight end as a sophomore and offensive tackle in his junior and senior years. As a senior, he was named an All-American by Parade and Scholastic Coach magazines and received the Gatorade Circle of Champions "Player of the Year" award and Tennessee Class 2A Mr. Football lineman award. Clifton's team lost in the state playoffs in his junior and senior years to Briarcrest Christian School in Memphis, Tennessee, whose offensive coordinator was former Ole Miss head coach Hugh Freeze.

== College career ==
In 1995, Clifton enrolled at the University of Tennessee and redshirted his first year. From then on, he was a fixture on the offensive line. He started one season at the right tackle position and three at the left tackle position. During these four years, the Tennessee Volunteers enjoyed great success with a 43–7 record and a win in the Fiesta Bowl over Florida State following the 1998 regular season to claim the National Championship. Clifton was a two-time All-Southeastern Conference selection (1997 second-team, 1998 first-team) and a Sporting News second-team All-American as a senior.

== Professional career ==
=== Green Bay Packers ===
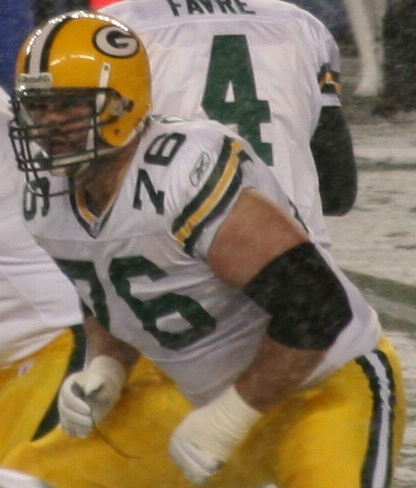
Clifton with the Packers in 2006

During the 2000 NFL draft, the Packers selected Clifton in the second round with the 44th overall pick.

Halfway through his rookie season, Clifton took over the starting left tackle position and would remain there for the rest of the season. He enjoyed continued success during his second season when he established a reputation as one of the NFL's best and unheralded blindside blockers for Brett Favre. He started 14 of the 16 regular season games and both playoff games in the 2001 season.

Clifton's 2002 season seemed as promising as his first two. However, on November 24, he suffered a severe pelvic injury after receiving a blindside hit from the Tampa Bay Buccaneers defensive tackle Warren Sapp. Because the incident occurred after an interception with Clifton far from the play, Sapp received harsh criticism for his action. After the game, when Packers head coach Mike Sherman told Sapp that his play was uncalled for, Sapp began angrily shouting at Sherman in a tirade that was caught on camera, with Sapp famously screaming "put a jersey on". For his part, Sapp did not visit or telephone Clifton during his four-day stay in a Tampa Bay hospital. As a result of his injury, Clifton missed the rest of the season, was hospitalized for almost a week, and could not walk unaided for five more weeks. In 2005, the NFL Competition Committee agreed on new guidelines for "unnecessary roughness", making hits such as that suffered by Clifton illegal.

Clifton returned in 2003 to start all 16 regular season games and two more games in the playoffs. He played all 1,031 offensive snaps that season and contributed to establishing a team record for fewest sacks allowed in a season with 19.

Clifton started all games for the Packers in the 2004 and 2005 seasons before being inactive in Week 7 of the 2006 season. He started every game the rest of the 2006 season.

In the 2007 season, Clifton started all 16 games in the regular season and the Packers' two playoff games. On January 23, 2008, it was announced that he would replace Seattle Seahawks tackle Walter Jones in the 2008 Pro Bowl, which was his first career Pro Bowl. He went to Hawaii to the Pro Bowl with teammates wide receiver Donald Driver, defensive end Aaron Kampman, and cornerback Al Harris, as well as head coach Mike McCarthy. Clifton's quarterback, Brett Favre, was scheduled to be in the Pro Bowl, but was replaced by Jeff Garcia.

Clifton started and appeared in 15 games in the 2008 season. He started and appeared in 12 regular season games and one playoff game for the Packers in the 2009 season.

On March 5, 2010, the Packers re-signed Clifton to a three-year, $20 million contract, with $7.5 million guaranteed.

Clifton appeared in all 16 regular season games and four postseason games for the Packers in the 2010 season. At the end of the 2010 season, Clifton and the Packers appeared in Super Bowl XLV. He was a starter in the 31–25 victory over the Pittsburgh Steelers. He earned a second career Pro Bowl nomination. He was ranked 99th by his fellow players on the NFL Top 100 Players of 2011.

In the 2011 season, Clifton missed a majority of the season with back and hamstring injuries.

On April 23, 2012, Clifton was released by the Packers after failing a physical.

Clifton did not sign with another NFL team after his release.

In 2016, Clifton was named to the Green Bay Packers Hall of Fame.

In 2017, Clifton was inducted into the Tennessee Sports Hall of Fame.
