= Jeff Hall (American football) =

American football player (born 1976)

No. 5
- Position: Placekicker

Personal information
- Born: July 30, 1976 (age 50); Tullahoma, Tennessee, U.S.
- Listed height: 5 ft 11 in (1.80 m)
- Listed weight: 190 lb (86 kg)

Career information
- High school: Winchester (TN) Franklin Co.
- College: Tennessee
- NFL draft: 1999: 6th round, 181st overall pick

Career history
- Washington Redskins (1999)*; St. Louis Rams (2000); Memphis Maniax (2001)
- * Offseason or practice squad member only

Awards and highlights
- BCS national champion (1998); 2× First-team All-SEC (1995, 1998)

Career NFL statistics
- Field goals attempted: 5
- Field goals made: 4
- Extra points: 9
- Stats at Pro Football Reference

Paul Jeffery Hall (born July 30, 1976) is an American former professional football player who was a placekicker for the St. Louis Rams of the National Football League (NFL). He played college football for the Tennessee Volunteers, and was selected in the sixth round of the 1999 NFL draft with the 181st overall pick by the Washington Redskins. He played one season in the NFL for the Rams in 2000, appearing in three games. After leaving the NFL, he became a NFLPA-registered financial advisor for Rather & Kittrell Capital Management in Knoxville, Tennessee.

Hall still holds the Tennessee high school record for the longest field goal at 62 yards, which he kicked for Franklin County High School on November 19, 1991, in a playoff game against Oak Ridge High School. Hall tied his own record with a 62-yard field goal against Brentwood Academy on October 16, 1992.

Hall was the starting placekicker for the Tennessee Volunteer football team that won the National Championship in the 1998 season.
