= Tee Martin =

American football player and coach (born 1978)

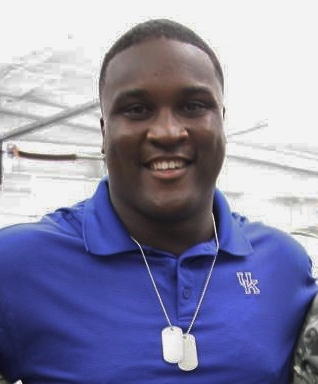
- Martin visits the Kentucky Army National Guard in 2010

LSU Tigers
- Title: Offensive analyst

Personal information
- Born: July 25, 1978 (age 48); Mobile, Alabama, U.S.
- Listed height: 6 ft 2 in (1.88 m)
- Listed weight: 225 lb (102 kg)

Career information
- Position: Quarterback (No. 17)
- High school: Williamson (Mobile, Alabama)
- College: Tennessee (1996–1999)
- NFL draft: 2000: 5th round, 163rd overall pick

Career history

Playing
- Pittsburgh Steelers (2000–2001); Rhein Fire (2002); Philadelphia Eagles (2002)*; Oakland Raiders (2003); Winnipeg Blue Bombers (2004–2005)
- * Offseason or practice squad member only

Coaching
- Morehouse (2006) Passing game coordinator; North Cobb HS (2007) Passing game coordinator & quarterbacks coach; North Atlanta HS (2008) Offensive coordinator & quarterbacks coach; New Mexico (2009) Quarterbacks coach; Kentucky (2010-2011); Wide receivers coach (2010); Passing game coordinator & wide receivers coach (2011); USC (2012–2018); Wide receivers coach (2013-2014); Passing game coordinator & wide receivers coach (2014-2015); Offensive coordinator & wide receivers coach (2016-2018); Tennessee (2019–2020) Assistant head coach & wide receivers coach; Baltimore Ravens (2021–2025; Wide receivers coach (2021-2022; Quarterbacks coach (2023-2025); LSU (2026–present) Offensive analyst

Awards and highlights
- As player: BCS national champion (1998); First-team All-SEC (1999)

Career NFL statistics
- Passing attempts: 16
- Passing completions: 6
- Completion percentage: 37.5%
- TD–INT: 0–1
- Passing yards: 69
- Passer rating: 25.3
- Stats at Pro Football Reference

Career CFL statistics
- Completion %: 42.1
- TD–INT: 1–4
- Passing yards: 458
- Passer rating: 43.2
- Rushing yards: 64
- Stats at CFL.ca (archived)

Tamaurice Nigel "Tee" Martin (born July 25, 1978) is an American football coach and former quarterback who is currently an offensive analyst for LSU. He previously served as an assistant coach at the University of Tennessee, University of Southern California, University of Kentucky, University of New Mexico, North Atlanta HS, North Cobb HS, and Morehouse College.

Martin played college football for the Tennessee Volunteers, leading their 1998 team to a national championship, and he was selected by the Pittsburgh Steelers in the fifth round of the 2000 NFL draft. During his six seasons of playing in the NFL and the Canadian Football League (CFL), Martin played for the Pittsburgh Steelers, Rhein Fire, Philadelphia Eagles, Oakland Raiders, and Winnipeg Blue Bombers.

== Early life ==
Martin attended and played high school football at Williamson High School in Mobile, Alabama.

== Playing career ==
=== College ===
While at the University of Tennessee, Martin played college football under head coach Phillip Fulmer from 1996 to 1999. Martin was a backup to Peyton Manning during his freshman and sophomore years at the University of Tennessee. During his junior season, Martin led the 1998 Tennessee Volunteers football team to a 13–0 record and a Fiesta Bowl victory over Florida State, winning the school its first NCAA Division I-A national football championship since 1951. He was teammates with running back Jamal Lewis in his early years at Tennessee and wide receiver Peerless Price, who each went on to play in the NFL.

In the 1998 season, Martin broke the NCAA record for consecutive completions. Against South Carolina, Martin completed his first 23 passes. Combined with a completion on his last pass the previous week against Alabama, Martin's string of 24 consecutive completions and 95.8% completion percentage set new records. Martin broke the Southeastern Conference record of Ole Miss' Kent Austin, which was 20 consecutive. He broke the NCAA record for completions over multiple games with 23 consecutive over two games, which was shared by Southern Cal's Rob Johnson and Maryland's Scott Milanovich. In addition, he broke the one-game record of 22 straight completions set by Iowa's Chuck Long in 1984. Lastly, his 95.8% completion percentage broke the previous best single-game completion percentage of 92.6% set by UCLA's Rick Neuheisel in 1983.

In 1999, Martin led the Vols to their second consecutive BCS bowl, a 31–21 loss to #3 Nebraska in the Fiesta Bowl. During Martin's two years as a starter at Tennessee, the Vols were 11–1 over six major conference foes, (2–0 vs. Alabama, 2–0 vs. Auburn, 2–0 vs. Georgia, 2–0 vs. Vanderbilt, 2-0 vs. Kentucky, and 1–1 vs. Florida).

==== College statistics ====
Year	School	Conf	Pos	G	Cmp	Att	Pct	Yds	Y/A	AY/A	TD	Int	Rate
1996	Tennessee	SEC	QB	11	2	4	50.0	24	6.0	6.0	0	0	100.4
1997	Tennessee	SEC	QB	4	6	12	50.0	87	7.3	5.2	1	1	121.7
1998	Tennessee	SEC	QB	12	153	267	57.3	2,164	8.1	8.5	19	6	144.4
1999	Tennessee	SEC	QB	11	165	305	54.1	2,317	7.6	7.1	12	9	125.0
Career	Tennessee				326	588	55.4	4,592	7.8	7.7	32	16	133.6

=== Professional ===
Pre-draft measurables
Height	Weight	Arm length	Hand span	40-yard dash	10-yard split	20-yard split	Vertical jump	Wonderlic
6 ft 1 5/8 in (1.87 m)	227 lb (103 kg)	30 3/4 in (0.78 m)	10 1/4 in (0.26 m)	4.61 s	1.62 s	2.67 s	34.5 in (0.88 m)	11
All values from NFL Combine

Martin was drafted in the fifth round with the 163rd overall pick in the 2000 NFL draft by the Pittsburgh Steelers. Martin spent one season in the NFL Europe league. During the 2002 season, he helped lead the Rhein Fire to a league best 7–3 record. The Fire lost in the World Bowl, falling 20–26 to the Berlin Thunder. In 2004, Martin was released as a member of the Oakland Raiders. Martin finished his playing career as the 3rd string quarterback for the Winnipeg Blue Bombers in 2004 and 2005.

== Coaching career ==
=== Morehouse College ===
Martin began his coaching career as the passing game coordinator at Morehouse College in 2006.

=== North Cobb HS ===
In 2007, Martin joined North Cobb High School as their passing game coordinator and quarterbacks coach.

=== North Atlanta HS ===
In 2008, Martin joined North Atlanta High School as their offensive coordinator and quarterbacks coach.

=== New Mexico ===
In 2009, Martin was hired by the University of New Mexico as their quarterbacks coach under head coach Mike Locksley.

=== Kentucky ===
In 2010, Martin joined as the wide receivers coach at the University of Kentucky under head coach Joker Phillips. In 2010, Martin was given an additional role as passing game coordinator.

=== USC ===
In February 2012, Martin was hired as the wide receivers coach at the University of Southern California under head coach Lane Kiffin. He had been linked with jobs at both Alabama and Oregon previously. News of his hiring at USC was broken by a tweet by quarterback Matt Barkley. Martin replaced Ted Gilmore who left to take a job at the Oakland Raiders. On December 18, 2015, Martin was promoted to offensive coordinator for the Trojans under head coach Clay Helton. On December 27, 2018, after a 5–7 season, Martin became a casualty of a staff shakeup and was fired from the position.

=== Tennessee ===
On January 15, 2019, Martin joined the University of Tennessee, his alma mater, as their assistant head coach and wide receivers coach under head coach Jeremy Pruitt.

=== Baltimore Ravens ===
On February 6, 2021, Martin was hired by the Baltimore Ravens as their wide receivers coach under head coach John Harbaugh, replacing David Culley, who departed to become the head coach of the Houston Texans.

On February 22, 2023, Martin was made quarterbacks coach, replacing James Urban.

On February 4, 2026, it was announced that the Ravens would not be retaining Martin on their new coaching staff under new head coach Jesse Minter.

=== LSU ===
On March 18, 2026, Martin was hired to serve as an offensive analyst for the LSU Tigers.

== Personal life ==
Martin was born and raised in Mobile, Alabama. He is married to his wife, Toya Rodriguez, a recording artist known professionally as Toya. His oldest child, Amari Rodgers, played as a wide receiver for the Houston Texans. Amari is a Clemson University alumnus, where he recorded over 1,000 receiving yards during his senior season. Martin's middle child, Kaden, is a highly recruited football and baseball prospect who is committed to the University of Miami as a baseball player but will also walk onto the football team. Martin's youngest son, Cannon, was born in 2012.

Martin owns Playmakers Sports, a company specializing in sports event planning, quarterback training, and skills development and is a college football expert on Comcast Sports Southeast program Talkin' Football. He is a quarterback coach for the Nike Elite 11 Quarterback Camps, Nike Football Training Camps, and has trained many high school and Division 1 quarterbacks. In 2008, Martin created the "Dual Threat" Quarterback Camp and Academy in Atlanta, Georgia.
