= Dwayne Goodrich =

American football player (born 1978)

No. 23
- Position: Cornerback

Personal information
- Born: May 29, 1978 (age 48); Calumet Park, Illinois, U.S.
- Listed height: 5 ft 11 in (1.80 m)
- Listed weight: 207 lb (94 kg)

Career information
- High school: Richards (Oak Lawn, Illinois)
- College: Tennessee
- NFL draft: 2000: 2nd round, 49th overall pick

Career history
- Dallas Cowboys (2000–2002)

Awards and highlights
- BCS national champion (1998); First-team All-SEC (1999); Second-team All-SEC (1998)

Career NFL statistics
- Games played: 16
- Stats at Pro Football Reference

Dwayne Lewis Goodrich (born May 29, 1978) is an American former professional football player who was a cornerback for the Dallas Cowboys of the National Football League (NFL). He played college football for the Tennessee Volunteers.

== Early life ==
Goodrich attended Harold L. Richards High School in Oak Lawn, Illinois. Under head coach Gary Korhonen, he played on offense as a tailback and on defense as a defensive back for the football team. He also practiced track, competing in the 100 and 200 metres.

As a senior, he had 41 tackles, six interceptions, 18 passes defensed and 61 carries for 563 yards. He helped his team win 22 out of his last 25 games, receiving Parade All-America, USA Today All-America and Prep Football Report National Defensive Player of the Year honors.

== College career ==
Goodrich accepted a football scholarship from the University of Tennessee, to play under head coach Phillip Fulmer. He played for the Volunteers from 1996 to 1999 and was a three-year starter. He was a backup cornerback as a true freshman, making 17 tackles, 2 interceptions and 4 fumble recoveries (led the team).

As a sophomore, he started 10 out of 12 games, tallying 45 tackles (seventh on the team), 4 interceptions (second on the team), 6 passes defensed and 2 fumble recoveries.

As a junior, he registered 41 tackles (2 for loss), 3 interceptions (second on the team) and 10 passes defensed (led the team). He became noteworthy after the 1999 Fiesta Bowl against the Florida State Seminoles. He was assigned to cover Florida State wide receiver Peter Warrick. In the second quarter of the game, Goodrich intercepted a pass and returned it 54 yards for a touchdown. The play helped Tennessee win the game by a score of 23–16 and the national championship. Goodrich was the defensive MVP of the game.

As a senior in 1999, he was named one of the team captains. He suffered a back injury before the start of the season, which would limit his play going forward. He posted 34 tackles (one for loss), 3 interceptions (tied for second on the team), 6 passes defensed and one forced fumble. He was suspended for violating team rules for the fourth game against Auburn University. He received second-team All-SEC honors.

He also practiced track & field as a freshman and sophomore, recording times of 10.5 seconds in the 100 metres and 21.7 seconds in the 200 metres.

== Professional career ==
Pre-draft measurables
Height	Weight
5 ft 11 in (1.80 m)	195 lb (88 kg)
Values from NFL Combine

The Dallas Cowboys entered the 2000 NFL draft without a first-round pick because of the trade that sent two first round choices to the Seattle Seahawks in exchange for wide receiver Joey Galloway. The team made cornerback a top draft priority, after considering the imminent departure of Deion Sanders and the injury history of Kevin Smith and Kevin Mathis.

Goodrich was selected in the second round (49th overall) after dropping because of a poor senior season, which would be the first of their three cornerbacks selections. Kareem Larrimore, who was taken in the fourth round (109th overall) and Mario Edwards who was taken in the sixth round (180th overall), were the other two.

As a rookie, Goodrich suffered a strained left hamstring in training camp, that put him so far behind that he did not make his professional debut until November 5 against the Philadelphia Eagles. He appeared in five games that season.

In 2001, he suffered a torn right achilles tendon in training camp and was placed on the injured reserve list on August 28. In 2002, he was mostly a reserve player and got a chance to start in his first NFL game. He appeared in 11 games that year.

On February 20, 2003, Goodrich was waived after he was involved in a hit and run accident that killed two people. In three seasons he started in only one game and had no interceptions.

== Legal issues ==
On January 14, 2003, Goodrich was involved in a hit and run accident that killed two people. On January 15, he was arrested on charges of vehicular manslaughter in relation to the accident. Goodrich struck and killed two motorists who were trying to rescue a man from a burning car on a North Dallas freeway. Though witnesses claimed Goodrich was going 100 mph, the state's accident reconstruction expert at trial estimated that Goodrich's car struck the victims and driver door of the wreckage at a considerably lower speed of between 54 mph and 80 mph.

On September 8, 2003, he was sentenced to seven and a half years in prison and fined $20,000 for the accident. He was convicted on two counts of criminally negligent homicide.

On January 9, 2006, prosecutors and relatives of the deceased victims successfully sought to add five years to his original seven and a half-year prison sentence. In court proceedings on January 9, 2006, in Dallas, the sole surviving victim of the January 2003 accident, Shuki Josef, requested permission to approach Goodrich to shake his hand. The gesture resulted in an emotion-filled embrace between the two men as Josef stated that he forgave Goodrich.

During the trial, Goodrich was not proven to have been intoxicated at the time of the incident. Goodrich lost his brother Walter to a motorcycle accident in 2004. He was released from prison on October 5, 2011, after serving eight years due to his conviction of two counts of criminally negligent homicide.
