= Peerless Price =

American football player (born 1976)

No. 81
- Position: Wide receiver

Personal information
- Born: October 27, 1976 (age 50); Dayton, Ohio, U.S.
- Listed height: 5 ft 11 in (1.80 m)
- Listed weight: 194 lb (88 kg)

Career information
- High school: Meadowdale (Dayton)
- College: Tennessee (1995–1998)
- NFL draft: 1999: 2nd round, 53rd overall pick

Career history
- Buffalo Bills (1999–2002); Atlanta Falcons (2003–2004); Dallas Cowboys (2005); Buffalo Bills (2006–2007)

Awards and highlights
- BCS national champion (1998); Second-team All-SEC (1998)

Career NFL statistics
- Receptions: 403
- Receiving yards: 5,281
- Receiving average: 13.1
- Receiving touchdowns: 31
- Stats at Pro Football Reference

Peerless LeCross Price (born October 27, 1976) is an American former professional football player who was a wide receiver for nine seasons in the National Football League (NFL).

Price played college football for the Tennessee Volunteers and was selected by the Buffalo Bills in the second round of the 1999 NFL draft. Price also played for the Atlanta Falcons and Dallas Cowboys.

== Early life ==
Born in Dayton, Ohio, Price's name was inspired by the name of a local moving company. His mother explained that he was given the name because she liked it, and also because she hoped that her son, growing up in a rough neighborhood, would avoid a life of crime.

Price was recruited heavily out of Meadowdale High School in Dayton. He was a high school All-American and was considered a major athlete when he enrolled at the University of Tennessee in 1995 because he was a three sport star in high school. Price played college football under head coach Phillip Fulmer.

== College career ==
=== 1995 season ===
As a freshman in the 1995 season, Price had six receptions for 71 receiving yards in a backup role in the Volunteers' 11–1 season.

=== 1996 season ===
During his 1996 sophomore campaign, Price recorded 32 receptions for three touchdowns and 609 yards in Tennessee's 10–2 season. He excelled in a 35–29 loss to the Florida Gators with seven receptions for 161 receiving yards and a receiving touchdown. In addition to gaining attention for his play on the field, Price was named to the Academic All-SEC team.

=== 1997 season ===
When Joey Kent left following the 1996 season, Price stepped into the starting lineup full-time as a junior, where Peyton Manning found Price to be a dependable target. In the 1997 season, he started every game and emerged as a legitimate deep threat. He finished with 48 receptions, netting 698 yards and six touchdowns and helped guide the Volunteers to an SEC Championship. He was, for the second consecutive year, named an Academic All-SEC pick.

=== 1998 season ===
After Marcus Nash graduated, Price stepped into the top spot on the Volunteers' receiving corps for the 1998 season. In a tight game against Alabama, Price tied a school record with a 100-yard kickoff return for a touchdown that sparked a Volunteers victory and continued their success. Tennessee finished the regular season 11–0 and faced Mississippi State in the SEC Championship Game. With the Vols trailing by four points in the fourth quarter, Price pulled in a pass over the shoulder for a 41-yard touchdown. Tennessee won the game by score of 24–14, and earned a spot in the Fiesta Bowl against Florida State to decide the national champion for the 1998 season.

In the final game of his career with Tennessee, Price recorded four receptions for a total of 199 yards and the deciding 79-yard receiving touchdown en route to a 23–16 victory and the school's first consensus national championship in 47 years. For his performance, Price was named the game's co-MVP with cornerback Dwayne Goodrich.

== Professional career ==
Pre-draft measurables
Height	Weight	Arm length	Hand span	40-yard dash	10-yard split	20-yard split	20-yard shuttle	Three-cone drill	Vertical jump	Broad jump
5 ft 10 7/8 in (1.80 m)	180 lb (82 kg)	31 1/2 in (0.80 m)	10 in (0.25 m)	4.55 s	1.56 s	2.60 s	4.09 s	7.28 s	35.0 in (0.89 m)	9 ft 8 in (2.95 m)
All values from NFL Combine

In spite of his successful career in college, Price still fell to the second round of the 1999 NFL draft, where he was drafted 53rd overall by the Buffalo Bills. He was the fifth wide receiver to be selected in the 1999 NFL Draft.

=== Buffalo Bills (first stint) ===
Price enjoyed his greatest success as the secondary receiver for the Bills. He made his NFL debut in the Bills' 1999 regular season opener. He had three receptions for 51 receiving yards in the 31–14 loss to the Indianapolis Colts. In Week 7, against the Seattle Seahawks, he had five receptions for 106 receiving yards and a touchdown in the 26–16 loss. In his rookie season, he appeared in all 16 games and had 31 receptions for 393 receiving yards and three receiving touchdowns.

In the 2000 season, Price had his best game in the regular season finale against the Seattle Seahawks with eight receptions for 132 receiving yards and a touchdown in the 42–23 victory. He finished the 2000 season with 52 receptions for 762 receiving yards and three receiving touchdowns in 16 games, which were all starts.

In Week 7 of the 2001 season, Price had eight receptions for 151 receiving yards and a receiving touchdown in the 27–24 loss to the San Diego Chargers. In Week 10, against the Seattle Seahawks, he had ten receptions for 138 receiving yards and one receiving touchdown in the 23–20 loss. In the 2001 season, Price had 55 receptions for 895 receiving yards and seven receiving touchdowns in 16 games, all starts.

In the 2002 season, he appeared in and started all 16 games. He had five games going over the 100-yard mark and two games with multiple receiving touchdowns. He caught 94 passes for 1,252 yards and nine touchdowns. His best game came on September 15, 2002, when he caught 13 passes for 185 yards and two touchdowns, including a 48-yard score in overtime, during a 45–39 victory against Minnesota. After the season, the Bills used the Franchise Tag to ensure Price stayed with the team. Price was given permission to seek a trade, and the Atlanta Falcons were willing to give up a first round pick in the 2003 NFL draft for Price. The Bills used it to select running back Willis McGahee.

=== Atlanta Falcons ===
In the 2003 season, Price appeared in all 16 games and recorded 64 receptions for 838 receiving yards and three receiving touchdowns. His best game on the season came in Week 5 against the Minnesota Vikings, with 12 receptions for 168 receiving yards and a touchdown in the 39–26 loss.

In the 2004 season, he finished with 45 receptions for 575 receiving yards and three receiving touchdowns. In the Divisional Round against the St. Louis Rams, he had a receiving touchdown in the 47–17 victory. He was released during the 2005 offseason.

=== Dallas Cowboys ===
In 2005, Price signed a one-year deal with the Dallas Cowboys to be the third receiver and punt returner. Price was also reunited with quarterback Drew Bledsoe, with whom he had shared so much success in Buffalo and who actively lobbied for his signing. He was released on December 3 after catching only six passes for 96 yards, of which one was 58 yards on a single pass play.

=== Buffalo Bills (second stint) ===
Price re-signed with the Bills and regained his secondary wide receiver role. In the 2006 season, he caught a game-winning touchdown against the Houston Texans and a crucial touchdown in a low-scoring game against the Minnesota Vikings. He finished the 2006 season with 49 receptions for 402 receiving yards and three receiving touchdowns.

Price was placed on the injured reserve list on October 19, 2007, after having season-ending neck surgery. He appeared in four games and had seven receptions for 68 yards.

=== Retirement and post-playing career ===
On February 14, 2008, the Bills released Price, after which he retired from football. According to Price, he then started coaching his daughter's fourth grade basketball team because they needed a coach. He continued coaching several teams. After a girl asked him if he had a degree, Price returned to college in 2016.

In May 2020, Price received his BA degree in psychology from the University of Tennessee in a virtual ceremony due to the COVID-19 pandemic. On February 3, 2021, Tennessee State University announced that Price had joined the Tigers football team as a volunteer coach for the spring season.

== NFL career statistics ==
Legend
**Bold**	Career high

=== Regular season ===
Year	Team	GP	GS	Receiving						Fumbles	
Year	Team	GP	GS	Rec	Yds	Avg	Lng	TD	FD	Fum	Lost
1999	BUF	16	4	31	393	12.7	45	3	19	0	0
2000	BUF	16	16	52	762	14.7	42	3	34	**3**	**3**
2001	BUF	16	16	55	895	**16.3**	70	7	37	1	0
2002	BUF	16	16	**94**	**1,252**	13.3	**73**	**9**	**57**	2	1
2003	ATL	16	15	64	838	13.1	49	3	40	0	0
2004	ATL	16	15	45	575	12.8	50	3	28	0	0
2005	DAL	7	1	6	96	16.0	58	0	4	0	0
2006	BUF	16	15	49	402	8.2	25	3	20	1	1
2007	BUF	4	4	7	68	9.7	22	0	5	0	0
Career		123	102	403	5,281	13.1	73	31	244	7	5

=== Postseason ===
Year	Team	GP	GS	Receiving						Fumbles	
Year	Team	GP	GS	Rec	Yds	Avg	Lng	TD	FD	Fum	Lost
1999	BUF	1	0	**5**	**62**	**12.4**	15	0	**3**	0	0
2004	ATL	2	2	**5**	59	11.8	**23**	**1**	**3**	0	0
Career		3	2	10	121	12.1	23	1	6	0	0
