= Shawn Bryson =

American football player and coach (born 1976)

No. 38, 24
- Position: Running back

Personal information
- Born: November 30, 1976 (age 49); Franklin, North Carolina, U.S.
- Listed height: 6 ft 1 in (1.85 m)
- Listed weight: 228 lb (103 kg)

Career information
- High school: Franklin
- College: Tennessee
- NFL draft: 1999: 3rd round, 86th overall pick

Career history

Playing
- Buffalo Bills (1999–2002); Detroit Lions (2003–2006)

Coaching
- Lenoir-Rhyne (2012) Fullback; Temple (2013) Graduate assistant; Florida A&M (2014) Running backs coach; Chattanooga (2015–2017) Running backs coach

Awards and highlights
- National champion (1998)

Career NFL statistics
- Rushing yards: 2,144
- Rushing average: 4.1
- Rushing touchdowns: 6
- Receptions: 185
- Receiving yards: 1,383
- Receiving touchdowns: 3
- Stats at Pro Football Reference

Adrian Shawn Bryson (born November 30, 1976) is an American former professional football player who was a running back in the National Football League (NFL). He played college football for the Tennessee Volunteers.

== College career ==
Bryson played at the University of Tennessee under head coach Phillip Fulmer from 1995–1998. Bryson contributed in all four seasons as a running back and was a threat in the receiving game considerably in his junior and senior seasons. Bryson was a team captain on the 1998 National Championship team. In the National Championship, which was the Fiesta Bowl, Bryson had three rushes for seven yards and three receptions for 34 yards and a receiving touchdown in the 23–16 victory over the Florida State Seminoles. With the Volunteers, Bryson rushed for 505 career yards and eight touchdowns. In addition, he recorded 50 receptions for 484 yards and one receiving touchdown.

== Professional career ==
=== Buffalo Bills ===
After his collegiate career at the University of Tennessee, Bryson was drafted by the Buffalo Bills in the third round with the 86th overall pick of the 1999 NFL draft.

Bryson missed the 1999 season due to a torn ACL.

Bryson made his NFL debut in Week 1 of the 2000 season. He scored his first NFL touchdown on a 11-yard reception against the San Diego Chargers in Week 7. He led the Bills in rushing in 2000 with 161 carries for 591 rushing yards. In addition, he had 32 receptions for 271 receiving yards and two receiving touchdowns.

In the 2001 season, Bryson started the final three games. In Week 15 against the Atlanta Falcons, he had 16 carries for 130 rushing yards and two touchdowns. In the following game, against the New York Jets, he had 28 carries for 107 rushing yards.

In the 2002 season, Bryson played in the first six games before going on Injured Reserve for the rest of the season with a torn ligament in his knee.

=== Detroit Lions ===
Following the 2002 season, Bryson signed with the Detroit Lions. Bryson had 158 carries for 606 rushing yards and three rushing touchdowns to go along with 54 receptions for 340 receiving yards in 16 games and 13 starts in the 2003 season.

In the 2004 season, Bryson appeared in all 16 games and started one. He finished with 50 carries for 264 rushing yards and 44 receptions for 322 receiving yards. Bryson had a similar role in the 2005 season. He appeared in all 16 games and started two. He finished with 64 carries for 306 rushing yards and 37 receptions for 284 receiving yards. In the 2006 season, Bryson appeared in six games before going on Injured Reserve with a knee injury.

After the 2006 season, Bryson did not play with another NFL team.

== NFL career statistics ==
Legend
**Bold**	Career high

Year	Team	Games		Rushing					Receiving					Kickoff returns				
Year	Team	GP	GS	Att	Yds	Avg	Lng	TD	Rec	Yds	Avg	Lng	TD	Ret	Yds	Avg	Lng	TD
1999	BUF	0	0	Did not play due to injury														
2000	BUF	**16**	7	**161**	591	3.7	24	0	32	271	8.5	32	**2**	8	122	15.3	26	0
2001	BUF	15	3	80	341	4.3	68	2	9	59	6.6	23	0	**16**	**299**	**18.7**	**32**	0
2002	BUF	6	0	13	35	2.7	10	0	1	9	9.0	9	0	1	18	18.0	18	0
2003	DET	**16**	**13**	158	**606**	3.8	39	**3**	**54**	**340**	6.3	26	0	—	—	—	—	0
2004	DET	**16**	1	50	264	**5.3**	28	0	44	322	7.3	30	0	2	27	13.5	14	0
2005	DET	**16**	2	64	306	4.8	**77**	1	37	284	7.7	**63**	0	4	55	13.8	25	0
2006	DET	6	1	2	1	0.5	1	0	8	98	**12.3**	37	1	—	—	—	—	0
Career		91	27	528	2,144	4.1	77	6	185	1,383	7.5	63	3	31	521	16.8	32	0

== Coaching career ==
In 2012, Bryson was the fullbacks coach at Lenoir-Rhyne University. He was a graduate assistant at Temple University in 2013 and the running backs coach at Florida A&M in 2014. Bryson was the running backs coach at UT Chattanooga from 2015–2017. In 2017, Bryson was hired as the second head coach in the short history of the Rabun Gap-Nacoochee School Eagles football program.
