= 1999 Fiesta Bowl =

College football bowl game and BCS National Championship

1999 Tostitos Fiesta Bowl
- BCS National Championship Game; 28th Fiesta Bowl
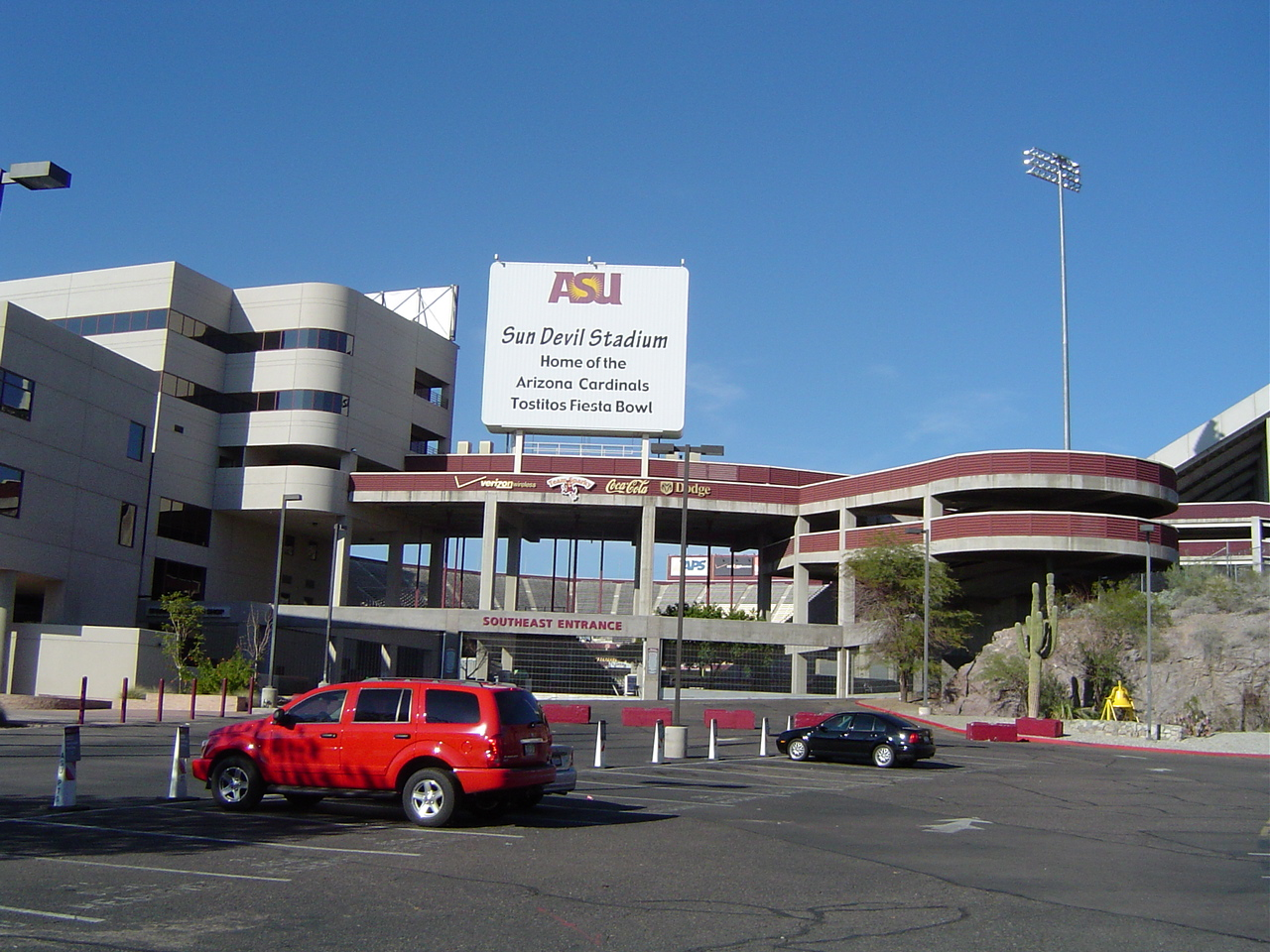
- Sun Devil Stadium in Tempe, Arizona, hosted the Fiesta Bowl.
Florida State Seminoles	Tennessee Volunteers
(11–1)	(12–0)
ACC	SEC
16	23
Head coach: Bobby Bowden	Head coach: Phillip Fulmer
AP / Coaches / BCS; 2 / 2 / 2	AP / Coaches / BCS; 1 / 1 / 1
	1	2	3	4	Total
Florida State	0	9	0	7	16
Tennessee	0	14	0	9	23
- Date: January 4, 1999
- Season: 1998
- Stadium: Sun Devil Stadium
- Location: Tempe, Arizona
- MVP: Peerless Price, WR; Dwayne Goodrich, CB
- Favorite: Florida State by 5½
- National anthem: Southwest Iowa and Mountain Pointe High School bands
- Referee: Bill Richardson (Pac-10)
- Attendance: 80,470

United States TV coverage
- Network: ABC
- Announcers: Keith Jackson, Bob Griese

The 1999 Fiesta Bowl, the designated BCS National Championship Game for the 1998 season, was played on January 4, 1999, in Tempe, Arizona at Sun Devil Stadium. The teams were the Tennessee Volunteers and Florida State Seminoles. Tennessee entered the contest undefeated and number one in the major polls, while Florida State had won 10 straight games after a Week 2 loss to NC State. Florida State sophomore QB Chris Weinke was injured in Florida State's final ACC game of the regular season and did not participate in the championship game. Ultimately, Tennessee won their sixth claimed national championship and first since 1967 by defeating the Seminoles, 23–16. The game was the first BCS National Championship.

== Game summary ==
=== First half ===
After a scoreless first quarter, Tennessee's QB Tee Martin fired a 4-yard touchdown pass to FB Shawn Bryson for the Vols to open up an early 7–0 lead. Bryson's TD came after the Vols took a Jeff Hall field goal off the board due to a roughing-the-kicker penalty. Shortly thereafter, Florida State had the ball near midfield. Seminoles QB Marcus Outzen threw an interception to Vol CB Dwayne Goodrich who was covering WR Peter Warrick, and it was returned 54 yards for a touchdown; thus, Tennessee opened up a 14–0 lead. The two scores both occurred in the first 25 seconds of the second quarter. Goodrich's interception changed the complexion of the game and forced Florida State to play from behind.

Florida State did get on the board later in the second quarter with a 1-yard run by FB William McCray, but Sebastian Janikowski missed an extra point off the crossbar, so the score stood at 14–6. At the end of the half, Janikowski drilled a 34-yard field goal, and the lead was cut to 14–9.

=== Second half ===
The second half saw a new challenge for the Vols, who were clinging to a narrow lead. Cornerback Dwayne Goodrich, who had the interception for a touchdown in the first half, was unable to play in the second half due to an ankle injury. He was replaced by Gerald Griffin, who had not seen much action that season. Griffin was assigned to cover Warrick, and did an adequate job, limiting Warrick to one catch for the game.

The Vol defense, as a unit, also held its own. Once again, both teams failed to score for an entire quarter. After the scoreless third quarter, the Vols got back on the scoreboard again. Tee Martin fired a 79-yard touchdown pass to Peerless Price, and the Vols claimed a 20–9 lead after a missed extra point by K Jeff Hall.

Later, Tennessee added a 23-yard field goal by Hall, and the lead extended to 23–9. But Florida State was not conceding the outcome yet. Seminole quarterback Marcus Outzen scrambled for a 7-yard touchdown, capping a Florida State drive, and the lead was cut to 23–16. With less than 2 minutes to go in the game, Tennessee RB Travis Henry fumbled and turned the ball over to Florida State. However, Outzen threw an errant pass that was intercepted by CB Steve Johnson, which sealed the victory and the national championship for the Vols.

=== Scoring summary ===
Scoring Play	Score
First quarter
No Scoring
2nd Quarter
Tennessee: Shawn Bryson 4-yard pass from Tee Martin (Jeff Hall kick), 14:05	Tennessee 7–0
Tennessee: Dwayne Goodrich 54-yard interception return (Hall kick), 13:40	Tennessee 14–0
Florida State: William McGray 1-yard run (kick failed), 8:59	Tennessee 14–6
Florida State: Sebastian Janikowski 34-yard field goal, 1:17	Tennessee 14–9
Third quarter
No Scoring
Fourth quarter
Tennessee: Peerless Price 79-yard pass from Martin (kick failed), 9:17	Tennessee 20–9
Tennessee: Hall 23-yard field goal, 6:01	Tennessee 23–9
Florida State: Marcus Outzen 7-yard run (Janikowski kick), 3:42	Tennessee 23–16

=== Highlights ===
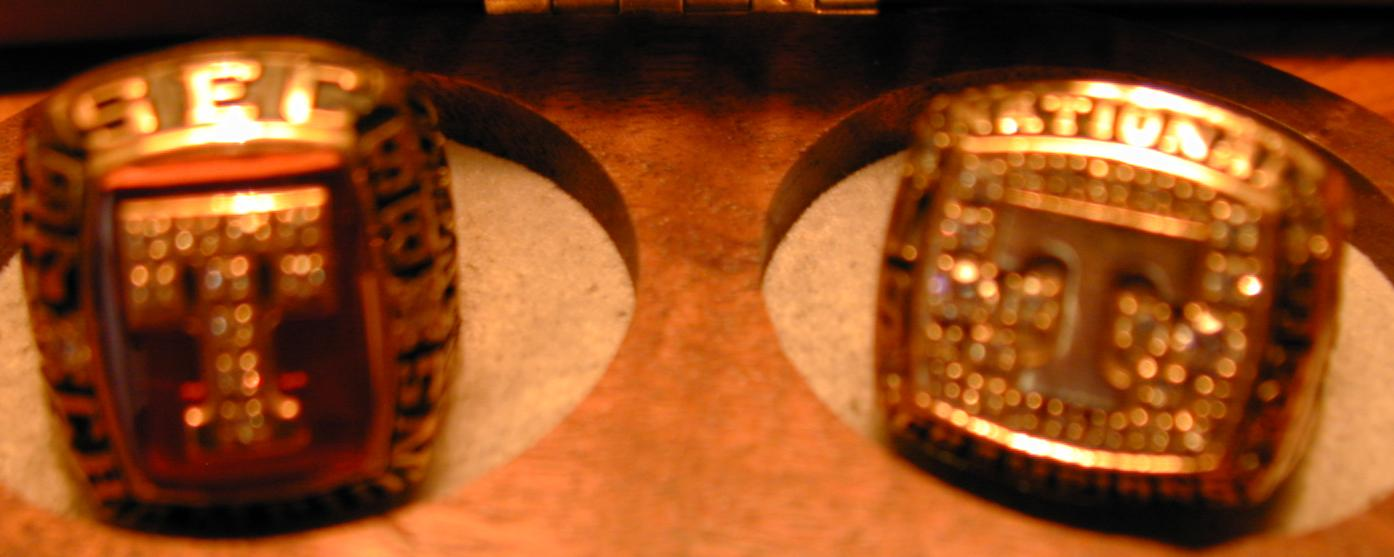
SEC and National Championship rings for the 1998 Tennessee Vols

- While Tennessee limited Peter Warrick when the Seminoles were on offense, Warrick was still successful in the return game. One memorable play, however, saw Tennessee punter David Leaverton make an open field tackle on Warrick. Had Warrick gotten past Leaverton, he would have most likely scored a touchdown. Instead, the Seminoles were held scoreless on the drive and ended up losing by seven points.
- Florida State contained the Vol passing attack except for two big plays. The first was a fade route from Tee Martin to Peerless Price that covered 76 yards and set up the Vols' first touchdown. The second was Price's 79-yard touchdown reception from Martin.
- Tennessee walk-on Tim Sewell had a blocked punt.
- Tennessee had 114 yards rushing, but leading carrier Travis Henry had only 28 yards rushing. The yards were spread out among Henry, Travis Stephens, Tee Martin, and Shawn Bryson.
- Peerless Price's 199 yards receiving broke a Tennessee bowl record, held formerly by Anthony Hancock. Hancock had 196 yards in the 1981 Garden State Bowl.
- The Tennessee defense held Florida State to only 253 total yards on offense. However, WR Ron Dugans had six catches for 135 yards to account for most of the total.
- Tennessee's seniors left the school with a 45–5 record after this game.
- This marked the final game for Tennessee's broadcasters John Ward and Bill Anderson, the longest-running broadcast partnership in college football.

== See also ==
- List of historically significant college football games
