= BCS National Championship Game =

American football game

BCS National Championship Game (defunct)
- Stadium: Four-year rotation between: State Farm Stadium; Caesars Superdome; Hard Rock Stadium; Rose Bowl
- Location: Four-year rotation between: Glendale, Arizona; New Orleans, Louisiana; Miami Gardens, Florida; Pasadena, California
- Previous stadiums: Sun Devil Stadium (1999 and 2003)
- Previous locations: Tempe, Arizona (1999 and 2003)
- Operated: 1999–2014
- Payout: US$23,900,000 (2014 game)
- Preceded by: Various contemporary and retroactive selectors (1869–1935); National polls (1936–1991); Bowl Coalition (1992–1994); Bowl Alliance (1995–1997)
- Succeeded by: College Football Playoff National Championship (2015)

Sponsors
- Tostitos (1999, 2003, 2007 and 2011); Nokia (2000 and 2004); FedEx (2001, 2005 and 2009); AT&T (2002); Citi (2006 and 2010); Allstate (2008 and 2012); Discover (2013); Vizio (2014)

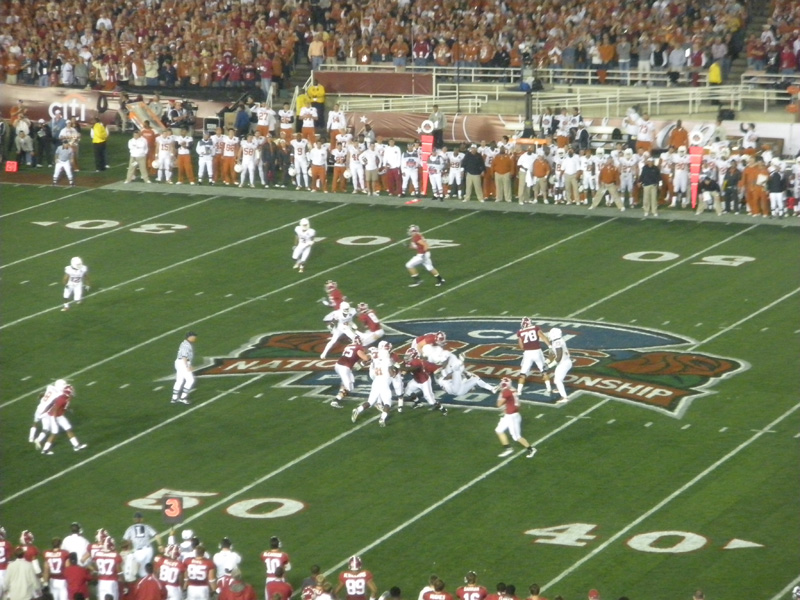
The view from the 50-yard line for the 2010 BCS National Championship at the Rose Bowl in Pasadena, California (Alabama vs. Texas)

The BCS National Championship Game was a postseason college football bowl game that determined the national champion of the NCAA Division I Football Bowl Subdivision (FBS). It was first played during the 1998 college football season as one of four designated bowl games, and beginning in the 2006 season, became a standalone event that rotated among the host sites of those bowl games.

The game was organized by a group known as the Bowl Championship Series, consisting of the Rose Bowl, Sugar Bowl, Fiesta Bowl, and Orange Bowl, which sought to match the two highest-ranked teams in a championship game to determine the best team in the country at the end of the season. The participating teams were determined by averaging the results of the final weekly Coaches' Poll, the Harris Poll of media, former players and coaches, and the average of six computer rankings. The Coaches' Poll was contractually required to name the winner of the game as its No. 1 team on the final postseason ranking; hence, the AFCA National Championship Trophy was presented to the winning team during a post-game ceremony.

The methodologies of the BCS system and its selections proved to be controversial. Although in most years the winner of the BCS National Championship would also be designated as the national champion by other organizations and polls (such as the Associated Press poll), the 2003 season was a major exception, as the BCS rankings chose the AP's No. 3-ranked team, the University of Oklahoma, over the No. 1-ranked team in that poll, the University of Southern California, to participate in the national title game (the Sugar Bowl) despite Oklahoma's loss to Kansas State University in the 2003 Big 12 Championship Game. That was the only season during the BCS era when the national championship was split, with Louisiana State University winning the BCS national championship and the University of Southern California winning the AP national championship, plus the football writers' national championship.

The BCS National Championship Game was played for the final time in 2013 after the same organizing group established a new system, the College Football Playoff, a four-team (later 12-team) single elimination tournament, as the successor to the BCS.

== History ==
The first BCS Championship was played at the conclusion of the 1998 NCAA Division I-A football season in accordance with an agreement by the Big Ten Conference, the Pac-10 Conference, and the Rose Bowl Game to join the "Bowl Alliance" system. The expanded format was called the Bowl Championship Series.

The Bowl Alliance and its predecessor, the Bowl Coalition, featured championship games for the 1992 through 1997 seasons. However, these could not always ensure a matchup between the top two ranked teams because of the lack of participation by the Big Ten and Pac-10.

The BCS National Championship Game was initially rotated among the four participating bowl games: the Fiesta Bowl, Sugar Bowl, Orange Bowl, and Rose Bowl. However, beginning with the 2006 season, the BCS National Championship Game was added as a separate contest, played after New Year's Day. The game rotated its location among the Fiesta, Sugar, Orange, and Rose venues.

== Game results ==
- For Bowl Coalition championship game results from 1992 to 1994, see: Bowl Coalition
- For Bowl Alliance championship game results from 1995 to 1997, see: Bowl Alliance

| Season | Date | Bowl | Winning team | | Losing team | | Stadium | Location | Attendance |
|---|---|---|---|---|---|---|---|---|---|
| 1998 | January 4, 1999 | Fiesta | 1 Tennessee | 23 | 2 Florida State | 16 | Sun Devil Stadium | Tempe, Arizona | 80,470 |
| 1999 | January 4, 2000 | Sugar | 1 Florida State | 46 | 2 Virginia Tech | 29 | Louisiana Superdome | New Orleans, Louisiana | 79,280 |
| 2000 | January 3, 2001 | Orange | 1 Oklahoma | 13 | 2 Florida State | 2 | Pro Player Stadium | Miami Gardens, Florida | 76,835 |
| 2001 | January 3, 2002 | Rose | 1 Miami (FL) | 37 | 2 Nebraska | 14 | Rose Bowl | Pasadena, California | 93,781 |
| 2002 | January 3, 2003 | Fiesta | 2 Ohio State | 31^{2OT} | 1 Miami (FL) | 24 | Sun Devil Stadium | Tempe, Arizona | 77,502 |
| 2003 | January 4, 2004 | Sugar | 2 LSU | 21 | 1 Oklahoma | 14 | Louisiana Superdome | New Orleans, Louisiana | 79,342 |
| 2004 | January 4, 2005 | Orange | 1 USC* | 55 | 2 Oklahoma | 19 | Pro Player Stadium | Miami Gardens, Florida | 77,912 |
| 2005 | January 4, 2006 | Rose | 2 Texas | 41 | 1 USC | 38 | Rose Bowl Stadium | Pasadena, California | 93,986 |
| 2006 | January 8, 2007 | Standalone game | 2 Florida | 41 | 1 Ohio State | 14 | University of Phoenix Stadium | Glendale, Arizona | 74,628 |
| 2007 | January 7, 2008 | Standalone game | 2 LSU | 38 | 1 Ohio State | 24 | Louisiana Superdome | New Orleans, Louisiana | 79,651 |
| 2008 | January 8, 2009 | Standalone game | 2 Florida | 24 | 1 Oklahoma | 14 | Dolphin Stadium | Miami Gardens, Florida | 78,468 |
| 2009 | January 7, 2010 | Standalone game | 1 Alabama | 37 | 2 Texas | 21 | Rose Bowl | Pasadena, California | 94,906 |
| 2010 | January 10, 2011 | Standalone game | 1 Auburn | 22 | 2 Oregon | 19 | University of Phoenix Stadium | Glendale, Arizona | 78,603 |
| 2011 | January 9, 2012 | Standalone game | 2 Alabama | 21 | 1 LSU | 0 | Mercedes-Benz Superdome | New Orleans, Louisiana | 78,237 |
| 2012 | January 7, 2013 | Standalone game | 2 Alabama | 42 | 1 Notre Dame^ | 14 | Sun Life Stadium | Miami Gardens, Florida | 80,120 |
| 2013 | January 6, 2014 | Standalone game | 1 Florida State | 34 | 2 Auburn | 31 | Rose Bowl | Pasadena, California | 94,208 |

*USC's victory in 2004 was later vacated due to NCAA violations
^Notre Dame's loss in the 2012 was later vacated due to the use of ineligible players

== Records by team ==
| Team | Conf. | Apps. | W | L | % | Game(s) |
|---|---|---|---|---|---|---|
| Florida State | ACC | 4 | 2 | 2 | .500 | 1998, 1999, 2000, 2013 |
| Oklahoma | Big 12 | 4 | 1 | 3 | .250 | 2000, 2003, 2004, 2008 |
| Alabama | SEC | 3 | 3 | 0 | 1.000 | 2009, 2011, 2012 |
| LSU | SEC | 3 | 2 | 1 | .667 | 2003, 2007, 2011 |
| Ohio State | Big Ten | 3 | 1 | 2 | .333 | 2002, 2006, 2007 |
| Florida | SEC | 2 | 2 | 0 | 1.000 | 2006, 2008 |
| Miami (FL) | Big East | 2 | 1 | 1 | .500 | 2001, 2002 |
| USC | Pac-12 | 2 | 1 | 1 | .500 | 2004, 2005* |
| Texas | Big 12 | 2 | 1 | 1 | .500 | 2005, 2009 |
| Auburn | SEC | 2 | 1 | 1 | .500 | 2010, 2013 |
| Tennessee | SEC | 1 | 1 | 0 | 1.000 | 1998 |
| Virginia Tech | Big East | 1 | 0 | 1 | .000 | 1999 |
| Nebraska | Big 12 | 1 | 0 | 1 | .000 | 2001 |
| Oregon | Pac-12 | 1 | 0 | 1 | .000 | 2010 |
| Notre Dame | Independent | 1 | 0 | 1 | .000 | 2012* |

Note: Conference affiliations are contemporaneous with the game, which may differ from the current alignment.

== Records by conference ==
| Conf. | Apps. | W | L | % | # of schools |
|---|---|---|---|---|---|
| SEC | 11 | 9* | 2* | .818 | 5 |
| Big 12 | 7 | 2 | 5 | .286 | 3 |
| ACC | 4 | 2 | 2 | .500 | 1 |
| Big East | 3 | 1 | 2 | .333 | 2 |
| Pac-12 | 3 | 1 | 2 | .333 | 2 |
| Big Ten | 3 | 1 | 2 | .333 | 1 |
| Independent | 1 | 0 | 1 | .000 | 1 |

Note: Conference affiliations are contemporaneous with the game, which may differ from the current alignment.
* Alabama defeated fellow SEC member LSU in the 2011 game, meaning the SEC was credited with both the victory and the defeat.

== Game records ==
| Team | Performance vs. opponent | Year |
|---|---|---|
| Most points | 55, USC vs. Oklahoma | 2005 |
| Most points combined | 79, Texas vs. USC | 2006 |
| Fewest points allowed | 0, Alabama vs. LSU | 2012 |
| Fewest points combined | 15, Oklahoma vs. Florida State | 2001 |
| First downs | 30, Texas vs. USC | 2006 |
| Rushing yards | 289, Texas (36 att.) vs. USC | 2006 |
| Passing yards | 374, Oregon vs. Auburn | 2011 |
| Total yards | 556, Texas (289 rush, 267 pass) vs. USC | 2006 |
| Total plays | 85, Auburn vs. Oregon | 2011 |
| Largest comeback | 18, Florida State vs. Auburn | 2014 |
| Individual | Performance, Team vs. Opponent | Year |
| Total offense | 467, Vince Young, Texas (267 pass, 200 rush) vs. USC | 2006 |
| Rushing yards | 200, Vince Young (QB), Texas (19 att.) vs. USC | 2006 |
| Rushing TDs | 3, Vince Young (QB), Texas vs. USC | 2006 |
| Passing yards | 363, Darron Thomas, Oregon vs. Auburn (28-41-2, 2 TD) | 2011 |
| Passing TDs | 5, Matt Leinart, USC vs. Oklahoma | 2005 |
| Receptions | 11, Kellen Winslow Jr., Miami vs. Ohio State (122 yards, 1 TD) | 2003 |
| Receiving yards (tie) | 199, Peerless Price, Tennessee vs. Florida State (4 rec., 1 TD) | 1999 |
| Receiving yards (tie) | 199, Andre Johnson, Miami vs. Nebraska (7 rec., 2 TD) | 2002 |
| Receiving TDs | 3, Steve Smith, USC vs. Oklahoma | 2005 |
| Field goals | 5, Jeremy Shelley, Alabama vs. LSU | 2012 |
| Tackles | 18, James Laurinaitis, Ohio State vs. LSU | 2008 |
| Sacks | 3, Derrick Harvey, Florida vs. Ohio State | 2007 |
| Interceptions | 2, Sean Taylor, Miami vs. Ohio State | 2003 |
| Long Plays | Performance, Team vs. Opponent | Year |
| Touchdown rush | 65, Chris "Beanie" Wells, Ohio State vs. LSU | 2008 |
| Touchdown pass | 79, Tee Martin to Peerless Price, Tennessee vs. Florida State | 1999 |
| Pass | 81, Darron Thomas to Jeff Maehl, Oregon vs. Auburn | 2011 |
| Kickoff return | 100, Levante Whitfield, Florida State vs. Auburn (TD) | 2014 |
| Punt return | 71, DeJuan Groce, Nebraska vs. Miami (TD) | 2002 |
| Interception return | 54, Dwayne Goodrich, Tennessee vs. Florida State (TD) | 1999 |
| Punt | 63, A.J. Trapasso, Ohio State vs. LSU | 2008 |
| Field goal | 46, David Pino, Texas vs. USC | 2006 |

== MVPs ==
| Season | Bowl | MVP(s) | Team | Position |
|---|---|---|---|---|
| 1998 | 1999 Fiesta Bowl | Peerless Price | Tennessee | WR |
| 1998 | 1999 Fiesta Bowl | Dwayne Goodrich | Tennessee | CB |
| 1999 | 2000 Sugar Bowl | Peter Warrick | Florida State | WR |
| 2000 | 2001 Orange Bowl | Torrance Marshall | Oklahoma | LB |
| 2001 | 2002 Rose Bowl | Ken Dorsey | Miami (FL) | QB |
| 2001 | 2002 Rose Bowl | Andre Johnson | Miami (FL) | WR |
| 2002 | 2003 Fiesta Bowl | Craig Krenzel | Ohio State | QB |
| 2002 | 2003 Fiesta Bowl | Mike Doss | Ohio State | S |
| 2003 | 2004 Sugar Bowl | Justin Vincent | LSU | RB |
| 2004 | 2005 Orange Bowl | Matt Leinart | USC | QB |
| 2005 | 2006 Rose Bowl | Vince Young | Texas | QB |
| 2005 | 2006 Rose Bowl | Michael Huff | Texas | S |
| 2006 | 2007 BCS National Championship Game | Chris Leak | Florida | QB |
| 2006 | 2007 BCS National Championship Game | Derrick Harvey | Florida | DE |
| 2007 | 2008 BCS National Championship Game | Matt Flynn | LSU | QB |
| 2007 | 2008 BCS National Championship Game | Ricky Jean-Francois | LSU | DT |
| 2008 | 2009 BCS National Championship Game | Tim Tebow | Florida | QB |
| 2008 | 2009 BCS National Championship Game | Carlos Dunlap | Florida | DE |
| 2009 | 2010 BCS National Championship Game | Mark Ingram II | Alabama | RB |
| 2009 | 2010 BCS National Championship Game | Marcell Dareus | Alabama | DT |
| 2010 | 2011 BCS National Championship Game | Michael Dyer | Auburn | RB |
| 2010 | 2011 BCS National Championship Game | Nick Fairley | Auburn | DT |
| 2011 | 2012 BCS National Championship Game | A. J. McCarron | Alabama | QB |
| 2011 | 2012 BCS National Championship Game | Courtney Upshaw | Alabama | DE |
| 2012 | 2013 BCS National Championship Game | Eddie Lacy | Alabama | RB |
| 2012 | 2013 BCS National Championship Game | C.J. Mosley | Alabama | LB |
| 2013 | 2014 BCS National Championship Game | Jameis Winston | Florida State | QB |
| 2013 | 2014 BCS National Championship Game | P.J. Williams | Florida State | DB |

== Heisman Trophy winners in BCS title games ==
| Season | Player | School | Result | Stats | Notes |
|---|---|---|---|---|---|
| 2000 | Chris Weinke | Florida State | L | 25-52-2 274, 0 TD; 4-7 rush | |
| 2001 | Eric Crouch | Nebraska | L | 15-5-1 62, 0 TD; 22-114 rush | |
| 2003 | Jason White | Oklahoma | L | 37-13-2, 102, 0 TD; 7-(-46) rush | |
| 2004 | Matt Leinart | USC | W | 35-18-0 332, 5 TD; 2-(-11) rush | |
| 2005 | Reggie Bush | USC | L | 13-82 1 TD; 6-95, 0 TD rec | |
| 2006 | Troy Smith | Ohio State | L | 14-4-1, 35, 0 TD; 10-(-29) rush | |
| 2008 | Sam Bradford | Oklahoma | L | 41-26-2, 256, 2 TD; 2-(-18) rush | |
| 2009 | Mark Ingram II | Alabama | W | 22-116, 2 TD | |
| 2010 | Cam Newton | Auburn | W | 34-20-1, 265, 2 TD; 22-64 rush | |
| 2013 | Jameis Winston | Florida State | W | 35-20-0, 237, 2 TD; 11-26 rush | |

== Criticisms and controversy ==
Critics of the BCS National Championship argued against the internal validity of a so-called national championship being awarded to the winner of a single postseason game. Critics lamented that the participants were selected based upon polls, computer rankings, popularity and human biases, and not by on-field competition, as in other major sports and all other levels of college football, which employed tournament-format championships. Often, the BCS system led to controversies in which multiple teams finished the season with identical records, and voters distinguished the worthiness of their participation in the BCS National Championship with no set of formal criteria or standards. The end of the 2010 season was one of the best examples of this. Without any objective criteria for evaluation of the teams, the BCS forced voters to impose their own standards and tiebreakers. Critics noted that the system inherently fostered selection bias, and therefore lacked both internal validity and external validity.

Controversies surrounding teams' inclusion in the BCS National Championship Game were numerous. In 2001, Oregon, ranked second in the AP poll, was bypassed in favor of Nebraska despite Nebraska's 62-36 blowout to Colorado in its final regular season game. In 2003, USC was not included in the championship game, but beat Michigan in the Rose Bowl and ended up No. 1 in the final AP poll. The following season, undefeated Auburn, Boise State, and Utah teams were left out of the national title game (the Orange Bowl). In 2008, Utah was excluded from the BCS championship for a second time despite being the only undefeated FBS team and finished second in the final AP poll behind Florida. In 2009, five schools finished the regular season undefeated: Alabama, Texas, Cincinnati, TCU, and Boise State; however, the BCS formula selected traditional powers Alabama and Texas to participate in the BCS National Championship Game.

In 2010, three teams, Oregon, Auburn, and TCU, all finished the year with undefeated records. While TCU statistically led the other two teams in all three major phases of the game (1st in defense, 14th in offense and 13th in special teams) the teams from the two automatic qualifying conferences, Oregon (Pac-12) and Auburn (SEC), were selected over the Horned Frogs for the 2011 national title game. Many voters cited TCU's membership in the non-automatic qualifying Mountain West Conference, perceived as having weaker teams, as one significant reason for their exclusion, despite TCU's undefeated regular-season records in both 2010 and the previous year. Adding to the controversy were comments made by the president of Ohio State University, Gordon Gee, who said that teams which played "the little sisters of the poor" instead of the "murderer's row" of teams in the automatic qualifier conferences did not deserve any national title game consideration. Gee retracted his statement and apologized after TCU defeated Wisconsin in the 2011 Rose Bowl (the Badgers had convincingly defeated Ohio State during the regular season).

Many critics of the Bowl Championship Series favored a tournament with eight to sixteen teams, similar to those administered by the NCAA for its Football Championship Subdivision (FCS), Division II, and Division III football championships. Others favored adopting the incremental step of adding a single post-bowl championship game between the winners of two BCS games among the top four ranked teams in the BCS standings, a so-called "plus-one" option. On June 24, 2009, the BCS presidential oversight committee rejected the Mountain West Conference's proposed eight-team playoff plan.

== Post-BCS ==
During 2012, the BCS actively considered changes to the format for the 2014 football season, either extending the season by one game by establishing a four-team semifinal round or by selecting the participants in the national championship game after the season's bowl games were completed. On June 26, 2012, the BCS presidential oversight committee approved a four-school playoff format in which the participants are determined by a selection committee. The semifinals are played as existing bowl games on or around New Year's Eve and New Year's Day. The championship game is played approximately a week later at a neutral site selected through a competitive bidding process. The 4-team format, known as the College Football Playoff began with 2014 college football season and concluded with the 2023 season. Beginning with the 2024 season, the playoff was expanded to 12 teams.

== Media coverage ==
=== Television ===
From 1999 through 2005, ABC broadcast eight BCS National Championship Games pursuant to broadcasting rights negotiated with the BCS and the Rose Bowl, whose rights were offered separately. Beginning with the 2006 season, FOX obtained the BCS package, consisting of the Orange Bowl, Fiesta Bowl, Sugar Bowl, and the BCS National Championship Games hosted by these bowls, with ABC retaining the rights to the Rose Bowl and BCS National Championship Games hosted by the Rose Bowl.

On November 18, 2008, the BCS announced that ESPN had won the television rights to the BCS National Championship Game, as well as the other four BCS bowls, for 2011–2014.

| Season | Bowl | Network | Play-by-play announcer | Color analyst(s) | Sideline reporter(s) | Studio host(s) | Studio analyst(s) | TV rating |
|---|---|---|---|---|---|---|---|---|
| 1998 | Fiesta | ABC | Keith Jackson | Bob Griese | Lynn Swann | John Saunders | Todd Blackledge | 17.2 |
| 1999 | Sugar | ABC | Brent Musburger | Gary Danielson | Lynn Swann and Jack Arute | John Saunders | Terry Bowden | 17.5 |
| 2000 | Orange | ABC | Brad Nessler | Bob Griese | Lynn Swann and Jack Arute | John Saunders | Terry Bowden | 17.8 |
| 2001 | Rose | ABC | Keith Jackson | Tim Brant | Lynn Swann and Todd Harris | John Saunders | Terry Bowden | 13.9 |
| 2002 | Fiesta | ABC | Keith Jackson | Dan Fouts | Lynn Swann and Todd Harris | John Saunders | Terry Bowden | 17.2 |
| 2003 | Sugar | ABC | Brent Musburger | Gary Danielson | Lynn Swann and Jack Arute | John Saunders | Terry Bowden and Craig James | 14.5 |
| 2004 | Orange | ABC | Brad Nessler | Bob Griese | Lynn Swann and Todd Harris | John Saunders | Craig James and Aaron Taylor | 13.7 |
| 2005 | Rose | ABC | Keith Jackson | Dan Fouts | Todd Harris and Holly Rowe | John Saunders | Craig James and Aaron Taylor | 21.7 |
| 2006 | Standalone game | Fox | Thom Brennaman | Barry Alvarez and Charles Davis | Chris Myers | Chris Rose | Emmitt Smith, Eddie George and Jimmy Johnson | 17.4 |
| 2007 | Standalone game | Fox | Thom Brennaman | Charles Davis | Chris Myers | Chris Rose | Eddie George, Urban Meyer and Jimmy Johnson | 17.4 |
| 2008 | Standalone game | Fox | Thom Brennaman | Charles Davis | Chris Myers | Chris Rose | Eddie George, Barry Switzer and Jimmy Johnson | 15.8 |
| 2009 | Standalone game | ABC | Brent Musburger | Kirk Herbstreit | Lisa Salters and Tom Rinaldi | Chris Fowler and Rece Davis | Lee Corso, Desmond Howard, Pete Carroll, Lou Holtz and Mark May | 17.2 |
| 2010 | Standalone game | ESPN | Brent Musburger | Kirk Herbstreit | Erin Andrews and Tom Rinaldi | Chris Fowler | Desmond Howard, Urban Meyer and Nick Saban | 16.1 |
| 2011 | Standalone game | ESPN | Brent Musburger | Kirk Herbstreit | Erin Andrews and Tom Rinaldi | Chris Fowler | Lee Corso, Gene Chizik and Chip Kelly | 14.0 |
| 2012 | Standalone game | ESPN | Brent Musburger | Kirk Herbstreit | Heather Cox and Tom Rinaldi | Chris Fowler | Urban Meyer and Desmond Howard | 17.5 |
| 2013 | Standalone game | ESPN | Brent Musburger | Kirk Herbstreit | Heather Cox and Tom Rinaldi | Chris Fowler | Lee Corso, Nick Saban and Desmond Howard | 15.7 |

==== Spanish ====
As part of ESPN's contract with the BCS, ESPN Deportes provided the first Spanish-language U.S. telecast of the BCS National Championship Game in 2012.

=== Radio ===
From 1999 to 2014, the BCS National Championship Game was broadcast on ESPN Radio.

| Year | Network | Play-by-play announcer | Color analyst(s) | Sideline reporter |
|---|---|---|---|---|
| 1998 | ESPN Radio | Ron Franklin | Mike Gottfried | Adrian Karsten |
| 1999 | ESPN Radio | Ron Franklin | Mike Gottfried | Adrian Karsten |
| 2000 | ESPN Radio | Ron Franklin | Mike Gottfried | Adrian Karsten |
| 2001 | ESPN Radio | Ron Franklin | Mike Gottfried | Adrian Karsten |
| 2002 | ESPN Radio | Ron Franklin | Mike Gottfried | Adrian Karsten |
| 2003 | ESPN Radio | Ron Franklin | Mike Gottfried | Adrian Karsten |
| 2004 | ESPN Radio | Ron Franklin | Mike Gottfried | Erin Andrews |
| 2005 | ESPN Radio | Ron Franklin | Bob Davie | Dave Ryan |
| 2006 | ESPN Radio | Brent Musburger | Bob Davie and Todd Blackledge | Lisa Salters |
| 2007 | ESPN Radio | Brent Musburger | Kirk Herbstreit | Lisa Salters |
| 2008 | ESPN Radio | Brent Musburger | Kirk Herbstreit | Lisa Salters |
| 2009 | ESPN Radio | Mike Tirico | Jon Gruden and Todd Blackledge | Wendi Nix |
| 2010 | ESPN Radio | Mike Tirico | Jon Gruden | Joe Schad |
| 2011 | ESPN Radio | Mike Tirico | Todd Blackledge | Holly Rowe |
| 2012 | ESPN Radio | Mike Tirico | Todd Blackledge | Holly Rowe and Joe Schad |
| 2013 | ESPN Radio | Mike Tirico | Todd Blackledge | Holly Rowe and Joe Schad |

== Related national championship selections ==
During the BCS era, there was no NCAA Division I FBS playoff, and the BCS National Championship Game was just one of several national championship selection processes in existence.

The American Football Coaches Association (AFCA) participated in a weekly Coaches' Poll published by USA Today; for its final poll of the season, the AFCA was contractually bound to select the BCS National Champion as its No. 1 team. Thus, the winner of the game was awarded the AFCA National Championship Trophy in a postgame ceremony.

The BCS National Champion was also automatically awarded the National Football Foundation's MacArthur Bowl.

The Associated Press and the Football Writers Association of America were independent of the BCS system; their national championship trophies could have been awarded to a school other than the BCS National Championship Game winner.
