= 2013 UCF Knights football team =

American college football season

2013 UCF Knights football

The American champion Fiesta Bowl champion

Fiesta Bowl, W 52–42 vs. Baylor
- Conference: American Athletic Conference

Ranking
- Coaches: No. 12
- AP: No. 10
- Record: 12–1 (8–0 The American)
- Head coach: George O'Leary (10th season)
- Offensive coordinator: Charlie Taaffe (5th season)
- Offensive scheme: Pro-style, option
- Defensive coordinator: Jim Fleming (2nd season; regular season)
- Base defense: 4–3
- Home stadium: Bright House Networks Stadium

2013 American Athletic Conference football standings
	Conf.			Overall
Team	W		L	W		L
No. 10 UCF $	8	–	0	12	–	1
No. 15 Louisville	7	–	1	12	–	1
Cincinnati	6	–	2	9	–	4
Houston	5	–	3	8	–	5
SMU	4	–	4	5	–	7
Rutgers	3	–	5	6	–	7
UConn	3	–	5	3	–	9
South Florida	2	–	6	2	–	10
Memphis	1	–	7	3	–	9
Temple	1	–	7	2	–	10
$ – BCS representative as conference champion; Rankings from AP Poll

The 2013 UCF Knights football team represented the University of Central Florida in the 2013 NCAA Division I FBS football season. The Knights were members of the American Athletic Conference (The American), and played their home games at Bright House Networks Stadium on UCF's main campus in Orlando, Florida. The Knights were led by head coach George O'Leary, who was in his tenth season with the team.

The 2013 season marked UCF's first as a member of the American Athletic Conference. The Knights were previously members of C-USA from 2005 to 2012, the MAC from 2002 to 2004, and were an independent from 1996 to 2001. UCF was originally barred from postseason play for the 2012 season due to recruiting violations in both football and basketball under previous athletic director Keith Tribble. The university was able to persuade the NCAA to postpone the postseason ban until the 2013 season, while they filed an appeal. In April 2013, the university won their appeal, the postseason ban was dropped entirely, and the team became bowl-eligible for the 2013–14 season.

The season was one of the most successful in program history, highlighted by six second-half, come-from-behind victories. Four games were won by scores inside the final five minutes, and another was won by a last-second goal line stand, earning the team the nickname the "Cardiac Knights." UCF's only loss was a 3-point defeat to eventual #4 South Carolina, a game which the Knights led at halftime. The Knights secured the program's fifth ten-win season (1990, 2007, 2010, 2012, 2013). It was the fourth such in FBS, as well as the fourth under O'Leary, and the first twelve-win season in school history. Thirteen starters from the 2013 season would later play in the NFL, including two first-round Draft picks.

Quarterback Blake Bortles led the program to its first victories over teams from the Big Ten and Big 12 conferences, by defeating Penn State and Baylor respectively. Bortles also led the Knights to their first win over a Top–10 team, upsetting eighth-ranked Louisville on their homecoming 38–35. The Knights won The American's first football championship under its new name (it had previously been the Big East), and the third conference championship in school history (2007, 2010, 2013). With the championship, UCF earned The American's automatic berth to a BCS bowl game, the first major bowl appearance in school history. The Knights were victorious in the Fiesta Bowl, upsetting the sixth-ranked Baylor Bears 52–42 for the first BCS bowl victory in program history. It was considered one of biggest upsets in BCS history.

Defensive coordinator Jim Fleming departed the program in December 2013 to become the head coach at Rhode Island and did not coach with the team in their Fiesta Bowl appearance. All games were broadcast live on the UCF-IMG radio network. The Knights flagship station was WYGM "740 The Game" in Orlando.

== Schedule ==
The 2013 schedule was officially released by The American on February 5, 2013. The 2013 schedule was developed as a "bridge" schedule for the 2013 and 2014 seasons, as a permanent system will be developed by the conference to address expanded membership and the creation of divisions by 2015. UCF will face eight conference opponents: UConn, Houston, Louisville, Memphis, Rutgers, SMU, South Florida, and Temple. They are also scheduled to play four non-conference games: Akron (MAC), FIU (C-USA), Penn State (Big Ten), and South Carolina (SEC).

UCF was one of only nineteen FBS schools, and the only member of The American, to not play an opponent from the FCS. The Knights had three bye weeks in the 2013 season: their first during week four, before facing South Carolina, the second during week seven, before facing Louisville, and the third during week ten, before facing Houston.

Date	Time	Opponent	Rank	Site	TV	Result	Attendance
August 29	7:00 pm	Akron*		Bright House Networks Stadium; Orlando, FL	ESPN3	W 38–7	35,115
September 6	8:00 pm	at FIU*		FIU Stadium; Miami, FL	CBSSN	W 38–0	15,823
September 14	6:00 pm	at Penn State*		Beaver Stadium; University Park, PA	BTN	W 34–31	92,855
September 28	12:00 pm	No. 12 South Carolina*		Bright House Networks Stadium; Orlando, FL	ABC	L 25–28	47,605
October 5	4:30 pm	at Memphis		Liberty Bowl Memorial Stadium; Memphis, TN	ESPN3	W 24–17	30,274
October 18	8:00 pm	at No. 8 Louisville		Papa John's Cardinal Stadium; Louisville, KY	ESPN	W 38–35	55,215
October 26	12:00 pm	UConn	No. 21	Bright House Networks Stadium; Orlando, FL (Civil Conflict)	AAN	W 62–17	37,924
November 9	7:00 pm	Houston^{†}	No. 19	Bright House Networks Stadium; Orlando, FL	ESPN2	W 19–14	44,665
November 16	12:00 pm	at Temple	No. 15	Lincoln Financial Field; Philadelphia, PA	AAN	W 39–36	20,174
November 21	7:30 pm	Rutgers	No. 17	Bright House Networks Stadium; Orlando, FL	ESPN	W 41–17	41,244
November 29	8:00 pm	South Florida	No. 17	Bright House Networks Stadium; Orlando, FL (War on I–4)	ESPN	W 23–20	45,952
December 7	12:00 pm	at SMU	No. 15	Gerald J. Ford Stadium; University Park, TX	ESPN	W 17–13	12,589
January 1	8:50 pm	vs. No. 6 Baylor*	No. 15	University of Phoenix Stadium; Glendale, AZ (Fiesta Bowl)	ESPN	W 52–42	65,172
*Non-conference game; ^{†}Homecoming; Rankings from AP Poll released prior to the game; All times are in Eastern time

== Personnel ==
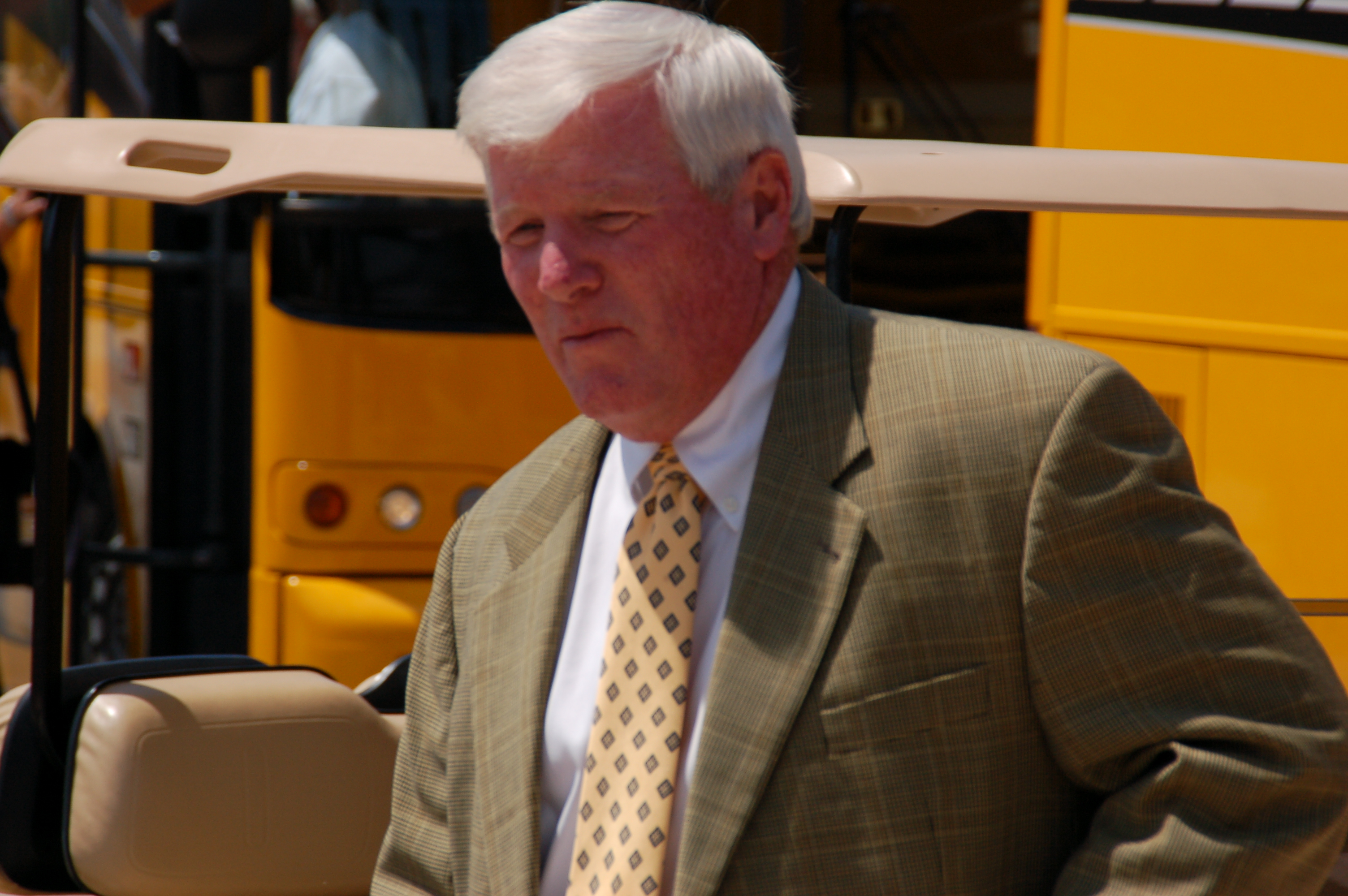
Head Coach George O'Leary

=== Coaching staff ===
2013 UCF Knights coaching staff
Head coaches: Head coach – George O'Leary; Offensive coaches: Offensive coordinator/quarterbacks – Charlie Taaffe; Running backs – Danny Barrett; Wide receivers – Sean Beckton; Offensive line – Brent Key; Graduate assistant – Keegan Kennedy; Graduate Assistant - Sean Fitzgerald; Defensive coaches: Defensive coordinator/linebackers – Jim Fleming; Defensive backs – Kirk Callahan; Defensive line – Lorenzo Costantini; Linebackers – Tyson Summers; Graduate assistant – Paul Carrington; Graduate Assistant - Andrew Dodge	Special teams: Special teams coordinator/tight ends – Mike Buscemi; Supporting Strength & Conditioning coach: S&C Support - Stefan Liskiewicz; Administrative staff: Athletic Director (A.D.) – Todd Stansbury; Assistant A.D. for Football Operations – Marty O'Leary; Director of player personnel – Drew Hughes

=== Roster ===
2013 UCF Knights roster
Quarterbacks: 5 Blake Bortles – junior; 13 Justin Holman – freshman; 14 Pete DiNovo – freshman; Fullbacks: 32 Mario Mathis – freshman; Running backs: 4 Micah Reed – freshman; 7 Dontravious Wilson – freshman; 8 Storm Johnson – (redshirt) junior; 17 Cedric Thompson – (redshirt) sophomore; 22 Michael Willett – freshman; 24 Blake Tiralosi – (redshirt) freshman; 23 William Stanback – freshman; 39 Joseph Puopolo – (redshirt) sophomore; 45 Daron Humphrey – (redshirt) freshman; Wide receivers: 2 Jeffrey Godfrey (QB) – senior; 6 Rannell Hall – junior; 9 J.J. Worton – (redshirt) junior; 11 Breshad Perriman – sophomore; 19 Josh Reese – (redshirt) junior; 20 Taylor Oldham – (redshirt) freshman; 80 Jackie Williams – senior; 81 Chris Johnson – freshman; 86 Michael Colubiale – freshman; 88 Kyle Coltrain – freshman; 89 Hayden Jones – freshman; Tight ends: 82 Blake Davis – (redshirt) freshman; 84 Justin Tukes – junior; 85 Kevin Miller – (redshirt) sophomore; 87 Cal Bloom – (redshirt) freshman	Offensive line: 55 Joey Grant – (redshirt) sophomore; 61 Tarik Cook – (redshirt) sophomore; 63 Jordan McCray – senior; 64 Justin McCray – senior; 65 Kelly Parfitt – (redshirt) freshman; 66 Aaron Evans – freshman; 67 Jared Warren – freshman; 68 Charles Sprenkel – freshman; 70 Chris Martin – (redshirt) senior; 71 Chester Brown – (redshirt) freshman; 72 Torrian Wilson – (redshirt) junior; 74 Michael Campbell – (redshirt) freshman; 75 Tate Hernly – freshman; 76 Colby Watson – (redshirt) freshman; 77 Kelly Davison – (redshirt) senior; 78 Savion McKenzie – (redshirt) sophomore; Linebackers: 15 Michael Easton – junior; 16 Mark Rucker – (redshirt) freshman; 23 Willie Mitchell – junior; 34 Justin McDonald – freshman; 36 Woodley Cadet – (redshirt) junior; 40 Chequan Burkett – freshman; 41 Terrance Plummer – junior; 43 Deondre Barnett – freshman; 50 Domenic Spencer – sophomore; 51 Jake Berman – freshman; 52 Maurice Russell – (redshirt) freshman; 53 Tyler Linde – (redshirt) freshman; 56 Cody Ralston – (redshirt) junior; 57 Troy Gray – junior	Defensive line: 42 Stanley Sylverain – (redshirt) freshman; 44 Miles Pace – (redshirt) sophomore; 47 Deion Green – (redshirt) sophomore; 48 Blake Keller – freshman; 49 Seyvon Lowry – freshman; 69 Thomas Niles – (redshirt) sophomore; 73 Jason Rae – freshman; 90 Micah Anderson – (redshirt) freshman; 91 Jock Petree – freshman; 92 Luke Adams – (redshirt) freshman; 93 Tony Guerad – freshman; 94 Demetris Anderson – (redshirt) sophomore; 95 E.J. Dunston – senior; 96 Andrew Rice – (redshirt) junior; 98 Rob Sauvao – (redshirt) junior; 99 Jaryl Mamea – (redshirt) junior; Defensive backs: 10 Shaquill Griffin – freshman; 12 Jacoby Glenn – (redshirt) freshman; 18 Shaquem Griffin – freshman; 21 Drico Johnson – (redshirt) freshman; 22 Jared Henry – (redshirt) freshman; 24 Jeremy Davis – (redshirt) freshman; 25 Brendin Straubel – (redshirt) sophomore; 26 Clayton Geathers – (redshirt) junior; 27 Sean Beckton – (redshirt) junior; 29 D. J. Killings – freshman; 30 Michael Patrick – (redshirt) senior; 31 Sean Maag – (redshirt) senior; 33 Jamar McClain – (redshirt) junior; 35 Damonte Jones – freshman; 37 Brandon Alexander – junior; 38 Jordan Ozerities – (redshirt) junior; 46 Jamonte Jones – freshman	Punters/Kickers: 18 Rodrigo Quirarte – (redshirt) junior; 35 Sean Galvin – (redshirt) junior; 36 Caleb Houston – (redshirt) freshman; 83 Shawn Moffitt – junior; Deep Snappers: 54 Gage Marsil – (redshirt) freshman; 56 Scott Teal – (redshirt) junior; 59 Mario Elliott – freshman; Terms: Freshman – A player in his first year.; Sophomore – A player in his second year.; Junior – A player in his third year.; Senior – A player in his fourth year.; Redshirt – A player who sat out a previous season.
"2013 Football Roster". UCF Athletics Association.

== Rankings ==
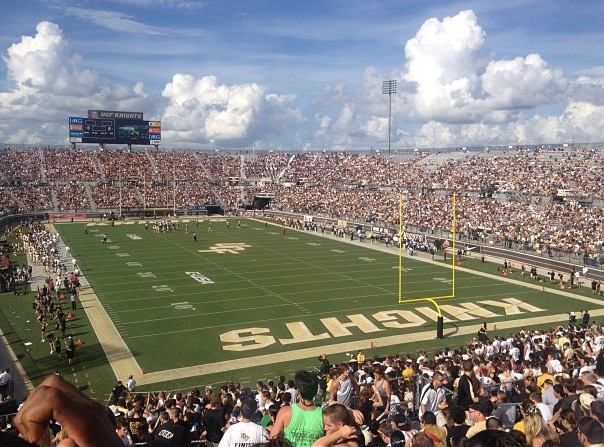
Bright House Networks Stadium, the Knights home field

Ranking movements Legend: ██ Increase in ranking ██ Decrease in ranking — = Not ranked RV = Received votes
	Week																
Poll	Pre	1	2	3	4	5	6	7	8	9	10	11	12	13	14	15	Final
AP	—	—	—	RV	RV	RV	RV	RV	21	19	19	15	17	17	15	15	10
Coaches	RV	RV	RV	RV	RV	RV	RV	RV	25	22	21	19	20	19	17	15	12
Harris	Not released							RV	25	22	21	19	20	20	18	15	Not released
BCS	Not released								23	23	21	17	18	19	16	15	Not released

The Knights entered the season unranked in the preseason polls. The team slowly ascended in both the AP and Coaches' polls receiving votes and finally reaching the top 25 after their key victory at Louisville on October 18. The first BCS standings released in week 8 saw the Knights ranked 23rd. The team also entered the top 25 of the Harris poll the same week. The Knights elevated to 15th in the AP poll two weeks later, their highest individual ranking in school history to date.

Despite winning head-to-head on the road in a nationally televised game, UCF ranked behind Louisville in the Coaches' poll until the final week of the regular season. This drew some ire of media and fans. The team slipped a couple spots in all three polls after their last second, come-from-behind victory at Temple, a game in which they struggled most of the early going. By the end of the regular season, the Knights had rebounded to cement themselves as 15th across the board in the AP, Coaches, and Harris polls. They were ranked 15th in the final BCS standings.

Following their victory in the Fiesta Bowl, the Knights were voted 10th in the final AP poll, and 12th in the final Coaches' poll. It was the highest respective ranking in each poll in school history.

== Game summaries ==
=== Akron ===
Akron vs. UCF – Game Summary

Quarter	1	2	3	4	Total
Zips	0	0	0	7	7
Knights	14	10	14	0	38

at Bright House Networks Stadium, Orlando, Florida

- Date: August 29, 2013
- Game time: 7:00 p.m. EDT
- Game weather: 87 °F (31 °C), Fair
- Game attendance: 35,115
- Referee: Tony Cannella (MAC)
- TV announcers (ESPN3): Drew Fellios (play-by-play), Al Groh (color commentator), and Tiffany Greene (sideline reporter)
- Recap

Game information

First Quarter

- UCF – Breshad Perriman 91 yard pass from Blake Bortles, 14:02 (UCF 7–0)
- UCF – Rannell Hall 19 yard pass from Blake Bortles, 2:23 (UCF 14–0)

Second Quarter

- UCF – J.J. Worton 39 yard pass from Blake Bortles, 6:54 (UCF 21–0)
- UCF – Shawn Moffitt 32 yard field goal, 0:58 (UCF 24–0)

Third Quarter

- UCF – Storm Johnson 9 yard run, 9:38 (UCF 31–0)
- UCF – Storm Johnson 1 yard run, 2:23 (UCF 38–0)

Fourth Quarter

- AKR – Imani Davis 11 yard pass from Nick Hirschman, 0:42 (UCF 38–7)

Top Passer

- Blake bortles – 18/24, 314 YDS, 3 TD

Top Rusher

- Storm johnson – 20 CAR, 99 YDS

Top Receive

- Breshad perriman – 3 REC, 113 YDS

UCF quarterback Blake Bortles threw for 314 yards and three touchdown passes as UCF rolled past Akron by the score of 38–7. On the second play of the game, Bortles connected with wide receiver Breshad Perriman for a 91-yard touchdown pass, and opened a lead the Knights would not surrender.

Running back Storm Johnson rushed for 99 yards and two touchdowns. Akron avoided a shutout with a "garbage time" touchdown with 42 seconds remaining. With the victory, UCF won their eighth-consecutive season opener.

=== FIU ===
UCF vs. FIU – Game Summary

Quarter	1	2	3	4	Total
Knights	7	17	14	0	38
Panthers	0	0	0	0	0

at FIU Stadium, Miami, Florida

- Date: September 6, 2013
- Game time: 8:00 p.m. EDT
- Game weather: 84 °F (29 °C), Partly cloudy
- Game attendance: 15,823
- Referee: Jeff Maconaghy (The American)
- TV announcers (CBSSN): Brad Johansen (play-by-play), Randy Cross (color commentator), and Rashan Ali (sideline reporter)
- Recap

Game information

First Quarter

- UCF – Blake Bortles 1 yard run, 7:02 (UCF 7–0)

Second Quarter

- UCF – Storm Johnson 2 yard run, 14:55 (UCF 14–0)
- UCF – Shawn Moffitt 37 yard field goal, 8:31 (UCF 17–0)
- UCF – Storm Johnson 15 yard run, 3:50 (UCF 24–0)

Third Quarter

- UCF – Storm Johnson 2 yard run, 7:36 (UCF 31–0)
- UCF – J.J. Worton 5 yard pass from Blake Bortles, 3:04 (UCF 38–0)

Top Passer

- Blake bortles – 12/19, 214 YDS, 2 TD

Top Rusher

- Storm johnson – 18 CAR, 89 YDS

Top Receiver

- Rannell hall – 4 REC, 127 YDS

Storm Johnson ran for three touchdowns as the Knights blew out FIU 38–0 for their second consecutive victory over the Panthers. With the win, UCF improved to 2–0 for the second time since 1999. Blake Bortles threw for 219 yards and Rannell Hall had four catches for 127 yards in the first half. Storm Johnson had 18 carries for 89 yards and three touchdowns. True freshman quarterback Justin Holman entered the game in the second half. Junior backup quarterback Tyler Gabbert quit the team for academic reasons earlier in the week.

=== Penn State ===
UCF vs. Penn State – Game Summary

Quarter	1	2	3	4	Total
Knights	7	14	10	3	34
Nittany Lions	7	3	7	14	31

at Beaver Stadium, University Park, Pennsylvania

- Date: September 14, 2013
- Game time: 6:00 p.m. EDT
- Game weather: 55 °F (13 °C), Clear
- Game attendance: 92,855
- Referee: Alex Kemp (Big Ten)
- TV announcers (Big Ten Network): Matt Devlin (play-by-play), Glen Mason (color commentator)
- Recap

Game information

First Quarter

- UCF – Storm Johnson 4 yard pass from Blake Bortles, 8:13 (UCF 7–0)
- PSU – Zach Zwinak 4 yard run, 4:26 (Tie 7–7)

Second Quarter

- UCF – Storm Johnson 58 yard run, 13:57 (UCF 14–7)
- UCF – J.J. Worton 5 yard pass from Blake Bortles, 8:51 (UCF 21–7)
- PSU – Sam Ficken 47 yard field goal, 3:33 (UCF 21–10)

Third Quarter

- UCF – Josh Reese 25 yard pass from Blake Bortles, 8:46 (UCF 28–10)
- PSU – Zach Zwinak 9 yard run, 7:23 (UCF 28–17)
- UCF – Shawn Moffitt 22 yard field goal, 2:30 (UCF 31–17)

Fourth Quarter

- PSU – Zach Zwinak 1 yard run, 13:55 (UCF 31–24)
- UCF – Shawn Moffitt 36 yard field goal, 8:10 (UCF 34–24)
- PSU – Allen Robinson 5 yard pass from Christian Hackenberg, 2:51 (UCF 34–31)

Top Passer

- Blake bortles – 20/27, 288 YDS, 3 TD, INT

Top Rusher

- Storm johnson – 17 CAR, 117 YDS

Top Receiver

- J.J. Worton – 7 REC, 101 YDS

Quarterback Blake Bortles threw for 288 yards and three touchdown passes as UCF defeated the Nittany Lions in Happy Valley. The game was the third meeting between the Knights and Nittany Lions, with Penn State winning the previous two games (2002, 27–24; 2004, 37–13). The victory marked UCF's first against a Big Ten opponent, and is also the first time the Knights have started the season 3–0 since 1988. The meeting also reunited Bill O'Brien and George O'Leary, under whom O'Brien was a graduate assistant in 1995, his first season coaching. The two squads are also set to meet in Ireland to open the 2014 season.

On the first drive of the game, Bortles led the Knights 89 yards on 13 plays to score first. Tied at the end of the first quarter, UCF took a 21–10 lead into halftime that they would not surrender. Though Penn State would get one touchdown with 13:55 left in the game, UCF answered with a 36-yard field goal from Shawn Moffitt to get a 10-point lead. Penn State drew within three with 2:51 left, but later fumbled inside UCF territory letting the Knights run out the clock. The Knights gained 507 yards of total offense, the most Penn State has allowed since the 2012 TicketCity Bowl. 34 points is also the most the Nittany Lions have allowed an opponent at home since joining the Big Ten in 1993.

=== South Carolina ===
#12 South Carolina vs. UCF – Game Summary

Quarter	1	2	3	4	Total
#12 Gamecocks	0	0	14	14	28
Knights	7	3	0	15	25

at Bright House Networks Stadium, Orlando, Florida

- Date: September 28, 2013
- Game time: 12:00 p.m. EDT
- Game weather: 81 °F (27 °C), Sunny
- Referee: David Smith (SEC)
- TV announcers (ABC): Dave Pasch (play-by-play), Brian Griese (color commentator), and Tom Luginbill (sideline reporter)
- Recap

Game information

First Quarter

- UCF – Storm Johnson 1 yard run, 10:05 (UCF 7–0)

Second Quarter

- UCF – Shawn Moffitt 27 yard field goal, 4:26 (UCF 10–0)

Third Quarter

- USC – Mike Davis 53 yard run, 13:51 (UCF 10–7)
- USC – Dylan Thompson 2 yard run, 3:58 (USC 14–10)

Fourth Quarter

- USC – Mike Davis 13 yard run, 14:02 (USC 21–10)
- USC – Mike Davis 13 yard run, 10:31 (USC 28–10)
- UCF – Rannell Hall 73 yard pass from Blake Bortles (2-point conversion), 9:48 (USC 28–18)
- UCF – Rannell Hall 7 yard pass from Blake Bortles, 1:54 (USC 28–25)

Top Passer

- Blake bortles – 25/36, 358 YDS, 2 TD, 2 INT

Top Rusher

- Storm johnson – 16 CAR, 64 YDS

Top Receiver

- Rannell hall – 8 REC, 142 YDS

The Knights took a 10–0 lead into halftime. The defense knocked South Carolina quarterback Connor Shaw out of the game with an injured shoulder. In the second half, however, the Gamecocks scored 28 unanswered points, two of the touchdowns off of UCF turnovers. Trailing 28–10, UCF started a rally, with Blake Bortles connecting to Rannell Hall for a 73-yard touchdown reception. With 3:28 left in the game, the Gamecocks fumbled away the ball at the UCF 3 yard line. Bortles connected with Breshad Perriman for a 79-yard reception, and a touchdown to Rannell Hall to make the score 28–25. An onside kick attempt by UCF failed, and South Carolina was able to run out the clock to secure the victory.

=== Memphis ===
UCF vs. Memphis – Game Summary

Quarter	1	2	3	4	Total
Knights	3	0	7	14	24
Tigers	7	0	3	7	17

at Liberty Bowl Memorial Stadium, Memphis, Tennessee

- Date: October 5, 2013
- Game time: 4:30 p.m. EDT
- Game weather: 86 °F (30 °C), Partly cloudy
- Game attendance: 30,274
- Referee: Tracy Jones
- TV announcers (ESPN3): Joel Meyers (play-by-play), Kevin O'Connell (color commentator)
- Recap

Game information

First Quarter

- MEM – Brandon Hayes 16 yard run, 11:25 (MEM 7–0)
- UCF – Shawn Moffitt 26 yard field goal, 1:46 (MEM 7–3)

Third Quarter

- UCF – William Stanback 1 yard run, 5:48 (UCF 10–7)
- MEM – Jake Elliot 48 yard field goal, 2:19 (TIE 10–10)

Fourth Quarter

- MEM – Sam Craft 13 yard run, 12:59 (MEM 17–10)
- UCF – Chris Martin 0 yard fumble recovery, 2:05 (TIE 17–17)
- UCF – Drico Johnson 12 yard fumble recovery, 1:56 (UCF 24–17)

Top Passer

- Blake bortles – 17/36, 160 YDS

Top Rusher

- Storm johnson – 16 CAR, 86 YDS

Top Receiver

- Breshad perriman – 7 REC, 107 YDS

UCF trailed 17–10 late in the fourth quarter, but pulled off a come from behind victory with two touchdowns in 9 seconds. With 2:05 left in regulation, running back Storm Johnson fumbled at the goal line, but Chris Martin recovered it in the endzone for a UCF touchdown. On the ensuing kickoff, Memphis returner Marquis Warford fumbled the ball as he was tackled by William Stanback. UCF's Drico Johnson scooped up the ball and returned it 12 yards for another touchdown. In the final minute, Memphis drove to the UCF 6 yard line, but quarterback Brandon Hayes was intercepted in the endzone, and the Knights secured a 24–17 victory.

=== Louisville ===
UCF vs. #8 Louisville – Game Summary

Quarter	1	2	3	4	Total
Knights	0	7	21	10	38
#8 Cardinals	7	7	14	7	35

at Papa John's Cardinal Stadium, Louisville, Kentucky

- Date: October 18, 2013
- Game time: 8:00 p.m. EDT
- Game weather: 59 °F (15 °C), Fair
- Game attendance: 55,215
- Referee: Ed Ardito
- TV announcers (ESPN): Carter Blackburn (play-by-play), Danny Kanell (color commentator), and Allison Williams (sideline reporter)
- Recap

Game information

First Quarter

- LOU – Eli Rogers 18 yard pass from Teddy Bridgewater, 5:29 (LOU 7–0)

Second Quarter

- UCF – William Stanback 4 yard run, 4:13 (TIE 7–7)
- LOU – DeVante Parker 10 yard pass from Teddy Bridgewater, 0:58 (LOU 14–7)

Third Quarter

- LOU – D. Brown 20 yard run, 9:26 (LOU 21–7)
- LOU – James Quick 30 yard fumble recovery, 7:52 (LOU 28–7)
- UCF – Storm Johnson 1 yard run, 4:50 (LOU 28–14)
- UCF – Storm Johnson 20 yard pass from Blake Bortles, 3:40 (LOU 28–21)
- UCF – William Stanback 12 yard run, 0:30 (TIE 28–28)

Fourth Quarter

- UCF – Shawn Moffit 34 yard field goal, 7:36 (UCF 31–28)
- LOU – D. Brown 15 yard run, 3:00 (LOU 35–31)
- UCF – Jeff Godfrey 2 yard pass from Blake Bortles, 0:23 (UCF 38–35)

Top Passer

- Blake bortles – 21/32, 250 YDS, 2 TD, INT

Top Rusher

- Storm johnson – 18 CAR, 109 YDS

Top Receiver

- Storm johnson – 4 REC, 79 YDS

The Knights achieved one of the biggest victories in school history against No. 8 Louisville in a nationally televised Friday primetime game on ESPN. UCF won for the first time against a Top–10 team, and earned their first victory over a ranked opponent since an upset of No. 12 Houston in 2009.

Louisville jumped out to a 28–7 lead in the third quarter, behind two touchdown passes by Heisman-candidate Teddy Bridgewater. Late in the third quarter, however, UCF staged a rally that ties the greatest comeback in school history (21). Storm Johnson scored a 1-yard touchdown run to trim the deficit to 28–14. On the next possession, Cardinals running back Senorise Perry fumbled the ball and it was recovered by UCF. One play later, quarterback Blake Bortles completed a short pass to Storm Johnson, who then scrambled across the field for a 30-yard touchdown pass. The score tightened to 28–21. On the next drive, the Knights were able to pin Louisville at their own 15, and eventually forced a punt. On their next possession, UCF went 56 yards in only three plays, scoring yet another touchdown as time was winding down in the third quarter. The Knights scored 21 points in 4:20.

At the start of the fourth quarter, the score was tied 28–28. UCF managed a field goal, and took a 31–28 lead, their first lead of the night. The Knights scored 24 unanswered points, and it was the first time Louisville had trailed in a game all season. With less than seven minutes left in regulation, Teddy Bridgewater led the Cardinals on a 9-play, 88-yard drive, capped off by a 15-yard touchdown run. With the score, Louisville took the lead 35–31 with 3:00 remaining. UCF's final drive went 75 yards in 11 plays, including two third-down conversions. Blake Bortles completed a 2-yard touchdown pass to Jeff Godfrey in the right corner of the endzone with 23 seconds left. With the win, the Knights entered the Top–25 for the first time since 2010.

=== UConn ===
UConn vs. #21 UCF – Game Summary

Quarter	1	2	3	4	Total
Huskies	3	7	0	7	17
#21 Knights	21	24	10	7	62

at Bright House Networks Stadium, Orlando, Florida

- Date: October 26, 2013
- Game time: 12:00 p.m. EDT
- Game weather: 75 °F (24 °C), Sunny
- Game attendance: 37,924
- Referee: Todd LaPenta
- TV announcers (AAN): Eamon McAnaney (play-by-play), Anthony Becht (color commentator), and Brooke Weisbrod (sideline reporter)
- Recap

Game information

First Quarter

- UCF – Storm Johnson 10 yard run, 12:37 (UCF 7–0)
- CON – Chad Christen 40 yard field goal, 10:27 (UCF 7–3)
- UCF – Blake Bortles 10 yard run, 7:39 (UCF 14–3)
- UCF – Storm Johnson 7 yard pass from Blake Bortles, 00:13 (UCF 21–3)

Second Quarter

- CON – Lyle McCombs 9 yard run, 12:03 (UCF 21–10)
- UCF – Shawn Moffit 50 yard field goal, 7:53 (UCF 24–10)
- UCF – Rannell Hall 17 yard run, 4:17 (UCF 31–10)
- UCF – Jeff Godfrey 10 yard pass from Blake Bortles, 1:29 (UCF 38–10)
- UCF – Jeff Godfrey 9 yard pass from Blake Bortles, 00:27 (UCF 45–10)

Third Quarter

- UCF – J.J. Worton 61 yard pass from Blake Bortles, 12:09 (UCF 52–10)
- UCF – Shawn Moffit 35 yard field goal, 10:07 (UCF 55–10)

Fourth Quarter

- CON – Brian Lemelle 9 yard pass from Casey Cochran, 10:11 (UCF 55–17)
- UCF – Jeff Godfrey 9 yard pass from Justin Holman, 02:50 (UCF 62–17)

Top Passer

- Blake bortles – 20/24, 286 YDS, 5 TD

Top Rusher

- Rannell hall – 5 CAR, 45 YDS

Top Receiver

- J.J. Worton – 6 REC, 119 YDS

UCF quarterback Blake Bortles threw for 286 yards and four touchdown passes, and ran for another touchdown, as the Knights routed winless UConn by the score of 62–17. The Knights led 21–10 early in the second quarter, then exploded for 37 unanswered points, including two touchdowns in the final two minutes of the first half. Bortles was rested in the fourth quarter, and his replacement, Justin Holman threw a touchdown pass of his own. The Knights 45-point victory was its largest win in conference play since first joining the MAC in 2002. After the victory, UCF rose to No. 19 in the AP poll, No. 22 in the Coaches Poll, and remained steady at No. 23 in the BCS standings.

=== Houston ===
Houston vs. #19 UCF – Game Summary

Quarter	1	2	3	4	Total
Cougars	0	0	7	7	14
#19 Knights	0	6	7	6	19

at Bright House Networks Stadium, Orlando, Florida

- Date: November 9, 2013
- Game time: 7:00 p.m. EST
- Game weather: 73 °F (23 °C), Clear
- Game attendance: 44,665
- Referee: Jeff Maconaghy
- TV announcers (ESPN2): Mark Jones (play-by-play), Brock Huard (color commentator), and Jessica Mendoza (sideline reporter)
- Recap

Game information

Second Quarter

- UCF – Shawn Moffit 45 yard field goal, 8:38 (UCF 3–0)
- UCF – Shawn Moffit 40 yard field goal, 2:12 (UCF 6–0)

Third Quarter

- HOU – John O'Korn 24 yard run, 7:59 (HOU 7–6)
- UCF – William Stanback 15 yard run, 2:25 (UCF 13–7)

Fourth Quarter

- UCF – William Stanback 38 yard run (2-point conversion no good), 10:23 (UCF 19–7)
- HOU – Wayne Beadle 12 yard pass from John O'Korn, 04:04 (UCF 19–14)

Top Passer

- Blake bortles – 17/24, 210 YDS, INT

Top Rusher

- Storm johnson – 28 CAR, 127 YDS

Top Receiver

- Jeff godfrey – 5 REC, 67 YDS

After a major defensive battle, UCF prevailed 19–14, capped off by a remarkable goal line stand in the final seconds in their Homecoming game over Houston. With the win, the Knights took sole possession of first place in The American, as the only team undefeated in conference play. The game began with two early turnovers by UCF in the red zone. Two field goals by Shawn Moffit gave the Knights a 6–0 lead at halftime, the first scoreless quarters by Houston all season. Houston responded with a touchdown in the third quarter on a 24-yard run by quarterback John O'Korn. UCF quickly responded, as William Stanback rushed for a touchdown to give UCF the lead that held for the rest of the night.

During the fourth quarter, the game took a terrible turn as a hit by Houston's Zachary McMillian took UCF's Breshad Perriman to the ground for nearly fifteen minutes. The play ended with McMillian ejected from the field for targeting. With emotion driving the Knights, they scored again with a 38-yard touchdown run by William Stanback, and took a 19–7 lead. UCF started to see the game slip away, however, as a blocked field goal attempt eventually led to a Houston touchdown by Wayne Beadle, and the lead was trimmed to 19–14. UCF was forced to punt the ball with three minutes left and gave favorable field position to the Cougars. Houston quickly drove the field, and had 1st & Goal at the UCF 10 yard line with 54 seconds left in regulation. Houston had four attempts at a game-winning touchdown, but failed to convert. On 4th & Goal with 20 seconds left, O'Korn's pass was tipped incomplete by junior safety Brandon Alexander, and UCF held on for the victory.

=== Temple ===
#15 UCF vs. Temple – Game Summary

Quarter	1	2	3	4	Total
#15 Knights	5	17	0	17	39
Owls	0	21	7	8	36

at Lincoln Financial Field, Philadelphia, Pennsylvania

- Date: November 16, 2013
- Game time: 12:00 p.m. EST
- Game weather: 53 °F (12 °C), Mostly cloudy
- Game attendance: 20,174
- Referee: Michael Roche
- TV announcers (AAN): Eamon McAnaney (play-by-play), Anthony Becht (color commentator), and Brooke Weisbrod (sideline reporter)
- Recap

Game information

First Quarter

- UCF – Safety, 6:39 (UCF 2–0)
- UCF – Shawn Moffit 20 yard field goal, 3:31 (UCF 5–0)

Second Quarter

- TEM – Jamie Gilmore 32 yard pass from P.J. Walker, 13:48 (TEM 7–5)
- UCF – William Stanback 49 yard run, 11:08 (UCF 12–7)
- TEM – P.J. Walker 3 yard run, 6:15 (TEM 14–12)
- UCF – J.J. Worton 4 yard pass from Blake Bortles, 3:56 (UCF 19–14)
- TEM – Robbie Anderson 30 yard pass from P.J. Walker, 2:13 (TEM 21–19)
- UCF – Shawn Moffit 35 yard field goal, 0:00 (UCF 22–21)

Third Quarter

- TEM – Robbie Anderson 75 yard pass from P.J. Walker, 3:31 (TEM 28–22)

Fourth Quarter

- UCF – J.J. Worton 38 yard pass from Blake Bortles, 6:37 (UCF 29–28)
- TEM – Chris Parthemore 7 yard pass from P.J. Walker (2-point conversion), 02:04 (TEM 36–29)
- UCF – J.J. Worton 30 yard pass from Blake Bortles, 1:06 (TIE 36–36)
- UCF – Shawn Moffit 23 yard field goal, 0:00 (UCF 39–36)

Top Passer

- Blake bortles – 27/38, 404 YDS, 4 TD

Top Rusher

- Storm johnson – 14 CAR, 122 YDS

Top Receiver

- J.J. Worton – 10 REC, 179 YDS

Knights wide receiver J.J. Worton made a remarkable one-handed diving touchdown catch in the back of the endzone with 1:06 left in regulation, as the Knights rallied for a last-second victory at Temple. The Owls (1–7) were in position most of the afternoon to potentially upset the 15th-ranked Knights. The game saw eleven lead changes, and both teams had combined for 1,175 yards of offense. In UCF football lore, the game became known simply as The Catch.

The Knights scored a safety and field goal in the first quarter. In the second quarter, quarterback Blake Bortles threw a 49-yard touchdown pass to William Stanback to take a 12–7 lead. On the next drive, Storm Johnson broke free for a 73-yard run that set up another touchdown pass, a 4-yard throw to J.J. Worton. The Knights defense, however, was not able to keep Temple at bay. They marched 80 yards in only five plays, and took a 21–19 lead. UCF closed out the first half with a long field goal drive, and a 22–21 lead at halftime. In the third quarter, UCF drove to a 1st & Goal at the Temple 4 yard line. Facing 4th & Goal inside the 1, the Knights failed to convert. Five plays later, Temple burned the Knights with a 75-yard touchdown pass, and a huge swing of momentum.

With less than seven minutes left in regulation, Bortles connected with J.J. Worton for a 38-yard touchdown, and a 29–28 lead. When Temple got ball, their drive was short-lived. Brandon Alexander intercepted P.J. Walker, the first turnover of the game. UCF went three-and-out, however, and managed to take only 54 seconds off the clock. Temple quickly drove 80-yards to a go-ahead touchdown. At the UCF 7 yard line, P.J. Walker scrambled to his left on a busted play to find Chris Parthemore wide open for the score. A two-point conversion made the score 36–29 in favor of the Owls.

Trailing by 7, UCF received the ball with 2:04 left in regulation. Bortles made three straight completions to move to the Temple 30. On 1st & 10 with 1:15 left, Bortles took a shotgun snap, but was immediately under pressure from blitzing linebacker Avery Williams, who was unblocked. Bortles rolled out to his left, and eluded the tackle. He was hit as he threw, but found J.J. Worton deep downfield. It appeared Bortles had overthrown his receiver, but Worton has slipped by the defenders. About 7 yards deep in the endzone, Warton leaped up and made a spectacular, one-handed, diving catch, landing just in-bounds to score the game-tying touchdown with 1:06 left. The play made ESPN's SportsCenter Top 10, and was later named the ESPN Sport Science Newton Award "Best Catch" of the year.

With the score tied 36–36 inside a minute to go, UCF forced Temple into a punting situation with 28 seconds left. Temple punted and UCF got the ball at their own 30. Rather than playing for overtime, Rannell Hall urged Bortles in the huddle to go deep against the Temple defense, which appeared unprepared for the play. On 1st & 10 with 19 seconds left in regulation, Bortles connected on a 35-yard pass to Hall, who broke free for a gain of 64 all the way to the Temple 6 yard line. The offense sprinted up to the line of scrimmage and spiked the ball with 3 seconds left. Kicker Shawn Moffitt made a chip-shot field goal as time expired, and UCF escaped with an improbable 39–36 victory. It was their fourth comeback win of the season.

=== Rutgers ===
Rutgers vs. #17 UCF – Game Summary

Quarter	1	2	3	4	Total
Scarlet Knights	0	14	0	3	17
#17 Knights	14	14	3	10	41

at Bright House Networks Stadium, Orlando, Florida

- Date: November 21, 2013
- Game time: 7:30 p.m. EST
- Game weather: 71 °F (22 °C), Cloudy
- Game attendance: 41,244
- Referee: Ed Ardito
- TV announcers (ESPN): Rece Davis (play-by-play), Jesse Palmer, (color commentator), David Pollack (color commentator), and Kaylee Hartung (sideline reporter)
- Recap

Game information

First Quarter

- UCF – Breshad Perriman 4 yard pass from Blake Bortles, 10:48 (UCF 7–0)
- UCF – Storm Johnson 12 yard run, 3:44 (UCF 14–0)

Second Quarter

- UCF – Storm Johnson 1 yard run, 8:58 (UCF 21–0)
- RUT – James Paul 1 yard run, 5:59 (UCF 21–7)
- UCF – Blake Bortles 7 yard run, 1:10 (UCF 28–7)
- RUT – Andre Patton blocked punt, 0:15 (UCF 28–14)

Third Quarter

- UCF – Shawn Moffit 32 yard field goal, 6:20 (UCF 31–14)

Fourth Quarter

- UCF – William Stanback 1 yard run, 14:14 (UCF 38–14)
- UCF – Shawn Moffit 42 yard field goal, 8:23 (UCF 41–14)
- RUT – Kyle Fredrico 35 yard field goal, 0:33 (UCF 41–17)

Top Passer

- Blake bortles – 21/30, 335 YDS, 2 TD

Top Rusher

- Storm johnson – 16 CAR, 75 YDS

Top Receiver

- Jeff godfrey – 5 REC, 117 YDS

Quarterback Blake Bortles threw for 335 yards, one touchdown pass, and ran for another touchdown, as UCF routed Rutgers by the score of 41–17. The victory marked the first time in program history that the Knights started a season 9–1, and the first time UCF opened conference play 6–0. Running back Storm Johnson rushed for 75 yards and two touchdowns, and J.J. Worton caught five passes for 117 yards. The game was Worton's third 100-yard receiving game of the season. Breshad Perriman, who sat out the Temple game due to his injury against Houston, returned to make five receptions for 99 yards and one touchdown.

The Knights scored on seven of their first eight possessions, jumping out to an early 21–0 lead. Late in the second quarter, Rutgers executed a fake punt for a gain of 38 yards, which led to their first touchdown of the game. With 41 seconds left in the half, Rutgers blocked a UCF punt, recovering it in the endzone for a touchdown. The Knights took a 28–14 lead into halftime. The second half was all in favor of UCF. A touchdown in the fourth quarter put the game well out of reach, and the Knights lengthened their winning streak to six straight.

=== South Florida ===
South Florida vs. #17 UCF – Game Summary

Quarter	1	2	3	4	Total
Bulls	3	3	7	7	20
#17 Knights	3	10	3	7	23

at Bright House Networks Stadium, Orlando, Florida

- Date: November 29, 2013
- Game time: 8:00 p.m. EST
- Game weather: 59 °F (15 °C), Clear
- Game attendance: 45,952
- Referee: Jeff Maconaghy
- TV announcers (ESPN): Carter Blackburn (play-by-play), Danny Kanell (color commentator), and Allison Williams (sideline reporter)
- Recap

Game information

First Quarter

- USF – Marvin Kloss 46 yard field goal, 10:35 (USF 3–0)
- UCF – Shawn Moffit 27 yard field goal, 1:20 (TIE 3–3)

Second Quarter

- USF – Marvin Kloss 42 yard field goal, 11:53 (USF 6–3)
- UCF – Justin Tukes 8 yard pass from Blake Bortles, 1:22 (UCF 10–6)
- UCF – Shawn Moffit 24 yard field goal, 0:06 (UCF 13–6)

Third Quarter

- USF – Chris Dunkley 13 yard run, 5:43 (TIE 13–13)
- UCF – Shawn Moffit 39 yard field goal, 4:06 (UCF 16–13)

Fourth Quarter

- USF – Marcus Shaw 1 yard run, 14:17 (USF 20–16)
- UCF – Breshad Perriman 52 yard pass from Blake Bortles, 4:50 (UCF 23–20)
- Blake bortles – 17/26, 219 YDS, 2 TD, 2 INT

Top Rusher

- Storm johnson – 10 CAR, 62 YDS

Top Receiver

- William stanbeck – 6 REC, 69 YDS
- Breshad perriman – 2 REC, 69 YDS

Despite turning the ball over five times, the Knights found a way to earn their first victory in the I–4 Corridor Clash against South Florida. The team wore their alternate black helmets and black trousers, a gesture to "Black Friday." Running back Storm Johnson fumbled the ball on UCF's first two drives, including a drop at the Bulls 10 yard line. Trailing with under five minutes left in regulation, Blake Bortles found Breshad Perriman for a 52-yard go-ahead touchdown reception. With 1:20 left in the fourth quarter and charging down the field, South Florida quarterback Mike White was intercepted by Jordan Ozerities, and he returned the ball 52 yards to the Bulls 37 yard line. The Knights ran out the clock, and set a program record for best record through eleven games (10–1), and tied school records for best conference start (7–0), and longest win streak (7).

With the victory, UCF earned at least a share of the American Athletic Conference football championship. Six days later, on Thursday December 5, Louisville defeated Cincinnati in The Keg of Nails rivalry. With the Bearcats' loss, the Knights clinched an automatic berth to a BCS bowl game, by virtue of holding a conference head-to-head tiebreaker over Louisville.

The game marked the 400th football game in school history.

=== SMU ===
#15 UCF vs. SMU– Game Summary

Quarter	1	2	3	4	Total
#15 Knights	0	3	14	0	17
Mustangs	3	7	3	0	13

at Gerald J. Ford Stadium, University Park, Texas

- Date: December 7, 2013
- Game time: 12:00 p.m. EST
- Game weather: 24 °F (−4 °C), Cloudy
- Game attendance: 12,589
- Referee: Tracy Jones
- TV announcers (ESPN): Dave Pasch (play-by-play), Brian Griese (color commentator), and Tom Luginbill (sideline reporter)
- Recap

Game information

First Quarter

- SMU – Chase Hover 33 yard field goal, 6:06 (SMU 3–0)

Second Quarter

- UCF – Shawn Moffit 32 yard field goal, 11:00 (TIE 3–3)
- SMU – Keenan Holman 30 yard pass from Neal Burcham, 8:40 (SMU 10–3)

Third Quarter

- UCF – Blake Bortles 1 yard run, 8:09 (TIE 10–10)
- SMU – Chase Hover 39 yard field goal, 3:24 (SMU 13–10)
- UCF – Blake Bortles 15 yard run, 0:14 (UCF 17–13)

Top Passer

- Blake bortles – 24/35, 242 YDS, 31 RUSH YDS, 2 RUSH TD

Top Rusher

- Storm johnson – 11 CAR, 37 YDS

Top Receiver

- Jeff godfrey – 5 REC, 62 YDS

In the coldest game in program history, UCF defeated SMU by the score of 17–13, to win the American Athletic Conference football championship outright, and finished with a then school-best 11–1 regular season record. They earned the school's first perfect conference record (8–0) since joining its first league (MAC) in 2002. The temperature at kickoff was 24 °F (−4 °C), with a wind chill of 13 °F (−11 °C). Fewer than 1,000 spectators were in the grandstands, after the city of Dallas had been nearly shut down by an ice storm.

SMU took a 10–3 lead into halftime. After a sluggish first half, UCF decided to change tactics, and play "Fastball" in the second half, an up-tempo, no huddle offense. In the third quarter, Blake Bortles led the Knights on two touchdown scoring drives to take the lead for good. With just over eight minutes left in the third quarter, Bortles punched into the endzone with a QB sneak for UCF's first touchdown, and a 10–10 tie. After an SMU field goal, Bortles led the Knights on the go-ahead drive in the waning seconds of the third quarter. Facing 2nd & 10 at the Mustangs 15 yard line, Bortles rolled out to his left, avoided tackles, and ran the ball in just inside the pylon for the go-ahead touchdown.

In the fourth quarter, SMU twice turned the ball over on downs. With eight minutes left in regulation, facing 4th & inches at the UCF 40, quarterback Neal Burcham was tackled short of the line to gain. He was knocked out of the game with a concussion. Burcham's replacement, third-string quarterback Garrett Krstich later threw an interception. In the final two minutes, UCF's defense forced another SMU turnover on downs, and the Knights secured the victory.

=== Fiesta Bowl ===
#15 UCF vs. #6 Baylor – Game Summary

Quarter	1	2	3	4	Total
#15 Knights	14	14	7	17	52
#6 Bears	7	13	8	14	42

at University of Phoenix Stadium, Glendale, Arizona

- Date: January 1, 2014
- Game time: 8:30 p.m. EST
- Game weather: Domed stadium
- Game attendance: 65,172
- Referee: Tom Ritter (SEC)
- TV announcers (ESPN/ESPN Radio): Sean McDonough (play-by-play), Chris Spielman (color commentator), and Shannon Spake (sideline reporter)/Bob Wischusen (play-by-play), Rod Gilmore (color commentator), and Quint Kessenich (sideline reporter)
- Recap

Game information

First Quarter

- UCF – Storm Johnson 11 yard run, 11:24 (UCF 7–0)
- UCF – Storm Johnson 2 yard run, 7:46 (UCF 14–0)
- BAY – Bryce Petty 1 yard run, 3:49 (UCF 14–7)

Second Quarter

- BAY – Levi Norwood 30 yard pass from Bryce Petty, 8:01 (UCF 14–13)
- UCF – Rannell Hall 50 yard pass from Blake Bortles, 5:05 (UCF 21–13)
- BAY – Bryce Petty 13 yard run, 2:55 (UCF 21–20)
- UCF – Rannell Hall 34 yard pass from Blake Bortles, 0:44 (UCF 28–20)

Third Quarter

- BAY – Byrce Petty 1 yard run, 10:18 (TIE 28–28)
- UCF – Breshad Perriman 10 yard pass from Blake Bortles, 5:38 (UCF 35–28)

Fourth Quarter

- UCF – Blake Bortles 15 yard run, 13:37 (UCF 42–28)
- BAY – Glasco Martin 9 yard run, 12:16 (UCF 42–35)
- UCF – Storm Johnson 40 yard run, 10:26 (UCF 49–35)
- UCF – Shawn Moffitt 36 yard field goal, 4:44 (UCF 52–35)
- BAY – Gary Fuller 9 yard pass from Bryce Petty, 1:15 (UCF 52–42)
- Blake bortles – 20/31, 301 YDS, 93 RUSH YDS, 3 TD, 1 RUSH TD, 2 INT

Top Rusher

- Storm johnson – 20 CAR, 124 YDS, 3 TD

Top Receiver

- Rannell hall – 4 REC, 113 YDS, 2 TD

In one of the biggest upsets of the BCS era, the No. 15 Knights stunned the No 6. Baylor Bears. Quarterback Blake Bortles led a potent offense that gained 556 total yards, 301 through the air and 255 on the ground. The Knights never trailed the entire game. Bortles threw for 301 yards, three touchdown passes, and ran for another touchdown. The victory marked the first time in program history that the Knights won a BCS bowl game, and the first time UCF defeated a Top–5 opponent (Baylor was ranked 5th in the Coaches Poll and the final BCS standings). Running back Storm Johnson rushed for 124 yards and three touchdowns. His three touchdown runs tied an individual school record for a bowl game. Rannell Hall caught four passes for 113 yards and two touchdowns.

Entering the game as a 17-point underdog, UCF opened an early 14–0 lead midway through the first quarter. The Bears scored two touchdowns but botched a snap on an extra point to come within one point with eight minutes left in the second. UCF entered halftime up 28–20. Baylor scored quickly after the break, tying the game on a two-point conversion. The Knights responded with a nine-play, 76-yard drive to retake the lead. UCF would not relinquish the lead, growing it to 17-points with 4:44 left in regulation. Baylor quarterback Bryce Petty led the Bears down the field to bring the game within ten points with a minute left, but the Bears failed to recover an onside kick.

Blake Bortles won the offense player of the game award, while Terrance Plummer was named defensive player of the game. The game was the highest-scoring Fiesta Bowl in history (94 points), and the second-highest-scoring BCS bowl ever. First playing football in 1979, UCF became the youngest program to win a BCS bowl game (35 seasons). The game is considered one of biggest upsets of the BCS era.

== Awards and milestones ==
=== Conference awards ===
- Blake Bortles — American Athletic Conference Offensive Player of the Year
- Blake Bortles — Sporting News American Athletic Conference Player of the Year
- George O'Leary — American Athletic Conference Coach of the Year
- George O'Leary — Sporting News American Athletic Conference Coach of the Year

=== All-Conference Teams ===
- American Athletic Conference First Team: Jordan McCray, Justin McCray, Blake Bortles, Storm Johnson, Terrance Plummer, Jacoby Glenn
- American Athletic Conference Second Team: J.J. Worton, Chris Martin, William Stanback, Shawn Moffitt, Clayton Geathers
- Sporting News All-AAC Offensive Team: Blake Bortles, Storm Johnson, Jordan McCray, Chris Martin
- Sporting News All-AAC Defensive Team: Terrance Plummer, Jacoby Glenn, Clayton Geathers

=== All-America Teams ===
- Sports Illustrated All-America Team (Honorable mention): Blake Bortles, Terrance Plummer, Shawn Moffitt

=== American offensive player of the week ===
- September 16: Blake Bortles
- October 21: Storm Johnson
- November 18: J.J. Worton

=== American defensive player of the week ===
- September 2: Terrance Plummer
- October 7: Terrance Plummer
- November 11: Brandon Alexander
- December 9: Clayton Geathers

=== American special teams player of the week ===
- October 28: Shawn Moffitt
- December 2: Rannell Hall

=== National awards and nominations ===
- Fiesta Bowl National Team of the Week — Week of October 20
- Manning Award Player of the Week—Blake Bortles
- Davey O'Brien Award — Blake Bortles (semifinalist)
- Lou Groza Award — Shawn Moffitt (semifinalist)
- Maxwell Football Club Collegiate Coach of the Year — George O'Leary (semifinalist)
- Eddie Robinson Coach of the Year — George O'Leary (finalist)
- ESPN Sport Science Newton Award: "Best Catch" — J.J. Worton (vs. Temple)

=== School records ===
- Best record: 11–1 (regular season), 12–1 (final including bowl game)
- Best away record: 7-0 (including bowl game)
- Best regular season conference record: 8–0
- Longest winning streak: 9 games
- Most wins by senior class: 38 (2010–2013)
- Highest ranking: #15 (BCS), #10 (AP), #12 (Coaches), #15 (Harris)
- Most field goals made, season: Shawn Moffitt, 21

== Offseason ==
On January 5, 2014, quarterback Blake Bortles announced that he would forgo his senior season of collegiate eligibility and enter the NFL Draft. Running back Storm Johnson also declared his eligibility for the draft.

=== NFL draft ===
Two former players were selected in the 2014 NFL draft:

Round	Pick	Overall	Name	Position	Team
1st	3	3	Blake Bortles	Quarterback	Jacksonville Jaguars
7th	7	222	Storm Johnson	Running back	Jacksonville Jaguars

Three former players signed as undrafted free agents:

Name	Position	Team
Chris Martin	Offensive lineman	Houston Texans
Jordan McCray	Offensive lineman	Green Bay Packers
Justin McCray	Offensive lineman	Tennessee Titans
