= 2013 Baylor Bears football team =

American college football season

2013 Baylor Bears football

Big 12 champion

Fiesta Bowl, L 42–52 vs. UCF
- Conference: Big 12 Conference

Ranking
- Coaches: No. 13
- AP: No. 13
- Record: 11–2 (8–1 Big 12)
- Head coach: Art Briles (6th season)
- Co-offensive coordinators: Randy Clements (6th season); Philip Montgomery (6th season)
- Offensive scheme: Veer and shoot
- Defensive coordinator: Phil Bennett (3rd season)
- Base defense: 4–3
- Home stadium: Floyd Casey Stadium

2013 Big 12 Conference football standings
	Conf.			Overall
Team	W		L	W		L
No. 13 Baylor $	8	–	1	11	–	2
No. 6 Oklahoma %	7	–	2	11	–	2
No. 17 Oklahoma State	7	–	2	10	–	3
Texas	7	–	2	8	–	5
Kansas State	5	–	4	8	–	5
Texas Tech	4	–	5	8	–	5
TCU	2	–	7	4	–	8
West Virginia	2	–	7	4	–	8
Iowa State	2	–	7	3	–	9
Kansas	1	–	8	3	–	9
$ – BCS representative as conference champion; % – BCS at-large representative; Rankings from AP Poll

The 2013 Baylor Bears football team represented Baylor University in the 2013 NCAA Division I FBS football season. The Bears, coached by Art Briles, were playing their 115th football season; this year was the team's 64th and final season at Floyd Casey Stadium in Waco, Texas. The Bears were members of the Big 12 Conference. The conference slate began with a home game against the West Virginia Mountaineers, and concluded at home against the Texas Longhorns.

The 2013 season was arguably the best in Baylor's history. After being ranked as high as third in the nation, the Bears went on to a school-record 11 wins and their first Big 12 title—their first outright conference title since winning their last outright Southwest Conference title in 1980. They represented the Big 12 in the 2014 Fiesta Bowl—their first appearance in the Bowl Championship Series, and their first major bowl game since the 1981 Cotton Bowl Classic. It was also their fourth straight bowl appearance, a school record.

The Baylor Bears football team drew an average home attendance of 45,948 in the final year of Floyd Casey Stadium. Baylor finished with an undefeated record at home.

== Recruiting ==
College recruiting
Name	Hometown	School	Height	Weight	40^{‡}	Commit date
Andrew Billings; DT	Waco, TX	Waco HS	6 ft 1 in (1.85 m)	305 lb (138 kg)	5.0	Feb 5, 2013
Andrew Billings; DT	Recruit ratings: Scout: Rivals: (82)					
Travon Blanchard; LB	Orange, TX	West-Orange Stark HS	6 ft 2 in (1.88 m)	185 lb (84 kg)	4.4	Feb 16, 2012
Travon Blanchard; LB	Recruit ratings: Scout: Rivals: (80)					
Byron Bonds; DT	Allen, TX	Allen HS	6 ft 2 in (1.88 m)	280 lb (130 kg)	NA	Jul 16, 2012
Byron Bonds; DT	Recruit ratings: Scout: Rivals: (72)					
Terell Brooks; DT	Duncanville, TX	Navarro JC	6 ft 4 in (1.93 m)	305 lb (138 kg)	NA	Feb 5, 2013
Terell Brooks; DT	Recruit ratings: Scout: Rivals: (–)					
Raaquan Davis; LB	Rockwall, TX	Rockwall-Heath HS	6 ft 2 in (1.88 m)	208 lb (94 kg)	NA	May 14, 2012
Raaquan Davis; LB	Recruit ratings: Scout: Rivals: (81)					
Kyle Fulks; DB	Katy, TX	Katy HS	5 ft 9 in (1.75 m)	160 lb (73 kg)	4.3	Apr 12, 2012
Kyle Fulks; DB	Recruit ratings: Scout: Rivals: (75)					
Kiante' Griffin; WR	Carrollton, TX	Hebron HS	6 ft 0 in (1.83 m)	200 lb (91 kg)	4.6	Jan 20, 2012
Kiante' Griffin; WR	Recruit ratings: Scout: Rivals: (79)					
Wesley Harris; DB	Fort Worth, TX	Southwest HS	6 ft 1 in (1.85 m)	175 lb (79 kg)	NA	Jul 21, 2012
Wesley Harris; DB	Recruit ratings: Scout: Rivals: (73)					
Johnny Jefferson; RB	Killeen, TX	Shoemaker HS	5 ft 10 in (1.78 m)	195 lb (88 kg)	4.5	Mar 22, 2012
Johnny Jefferson; RB	Recruit ratings: Scout: Rivals: (79)					
Chris Johnson; QB	Bryan, TX	Bryan HS	6 ft 5 in (1.96 m)	195 lb (88 kg)	NA	Jan 29, 2012
Chris Johnson; QB	Recruit ratings: Scout: Rivals: (83)					
Quan Jones; WR	Wylie, TX	Wylie East HS	6 ft 4 in (1.93 m)	200 lb (91 kg)	4.5	May 26, 2012
Quan Jones; WR	Recruit ratings: Scout: Rivals: (74)					
Andrew Jupe; DB	San Antonio, TX	East Central HS	6 ft 1 in (1.85 m)	180 lb (82 kg)	4.6	Jun 11, 2012
Andrew Jupe; DB	Recruit ratings: Scout: Rivals: (72)					
Darius Moore; OL	Missouri City, TX	FB Marshall HS	6 ft 3 in (1.91 m)	275 lb (125 kg)	NA	Jul 26, 2012
Darius Moore; OL	Recruit ratings: Scout: Rivals: (71)					
Brian Nance; LB	Euless, TX	Hargrave Military Academy	6 ft 3 in (1.91 m)	220 lb (100 kg)	NA	Feb 1, 2012
Brian Nance; LB	Recruit ratings: Scout: Rivals: (81)					
Gus Penning; TE	Jenison, MI	Riverside CC	6 ft 6 in (1.98 m)	245 lb (111 kg)	4.6	Jul 23, 2012
Gus Penning; TE	Recruit ratings: Scout: Rivals: (79)					
Xavier Phillips; LB	Fort Worth, TX	All Saints' Episcopal School	6 ft 2 in (1.88 m)	220 lb (100 kg)	4.6	Jun 20, 2012
Xavier Phillips; LB	Recruit ratings: Scout: Rivals: (78)					
Maurice Porter; OL	Missouri City, TX	FB Marshall HS	6 ft 5 in (1.96 m)	285 lb (129 kg)	NA	Feb 4, 2013
Maurice Porter; OL	Recruit ratings: Scout: Rivals: (77)					
Alfred Pullom; DB	Cypress, TX	Cypress Woods HS	6 ft 1 in (1.85 m)	185 lb (84 kg)	4.6	Jul 20, 2012
Alfred Pullom; DB	Recruit ratings: Scout: Rivals: (74)					
Robbie Rhodes; WR	Fort Worth, TX	Southwest HS	6 ft 1 in (1.85 m)	185 lb (84 kg)	4.5	Jun 10, 2012
Robbie Rhodes; WR	Recruit ratings: Scout: Rivals: (87)					
Taion Sells; DB	Irving, TX	Macarthur HS	5 ft 10 in (1.78 m)	180 lb (82 kg)	4.4	Jun 10, 2012
Taion Sells; DB	Recruit ratings: Scout: Rivals: (76)					
K.J. Smith; DE	Frisco, TX	Centennial HS	6 ft 2 in (1.88 m)	240 lb (110 kg)	NA	Feb 16, 2012
K.J. Smith; DE	Recruit ratings: Scout: Rivals: (76)					
Tanner Thrift; DE	Hutto, TX	Hutto HS	6 ft 5 in (1.96 m)	240 lb (110 kg)	NA	May 14, 2012
Tanner Thrift; DE	Recruit ratings: Scout: Rivals: (70)					
Taylor Young; LB	DeSoto, TX	DeSoto HS	5 ft 10 in (1.78 m)	215 lb (98 kg)	4.6	Nov 23, 2009
Taylor Young; LB	Recruit ratings: Scout: Rivals: (–)					
Overall recruit ranking: Scout: 26 Rivals: 30 ESPN: 28
‡ Refers to 40-yard dash; Note: In many cases, Scout, Rivals, 247Sports, On3, and ESPN may conflict in their listings of height, weight and 40 time.; In these cases, the average was taken. ESPN grades are on a 100-point scale.; Sources: "2013 Team Ranking". Rivals.com.

== Schedule ==
Date	Time	Opponent	Rank	Site	TV	Result	Attendance
August 31	6:30 p.m.	No. 8 (FCS) Wofford*		Floyd Casey Stadium; Waco, TX	FCS Central	W 69–3	44,989
September 7	2:30 p.m.	Buffalo*	No. 23	Floyd Casey Stadium; Waco, TX	FSN	W 70–13	39,126
September 21	3:00 p.m.	Louisiana–Monroe*	No. 20	Floyd Casey Stadium; Waco, TX	FS1	W 70–7	42,967
October 5	7:00 p.m.	West Virginia	No. 17	Floyd Casey Stadium; Waco, TX	FS1	W 73–42	45,467
October 12	2:30 p.m.	at Kansas State	No. 15	Bill Snyder Family Football Stadium; Manhattan, KS	FOX	W 35–25	52,803
October 19	6:00 p.m.	Iowa State^{†}	No. 12	Floyd Casey Stadium; Waco, TX	ESPNU	W 71–7	46,825
October 26	6:00 p.m.	at Kansas	No. 6	Memorial Stadium; Lawrence, KS	ESPNU	W 59–14	32,264
November 7	6:30 p.m.	No. 12 Oklahoma	No. 5	Floyd Casey Stadium; Waco, TX	FS1	W 41–12	50,537
November 16	6:00 p.m.	vs. Texas Tech	No. 4	AT&T Stadium; Arlington, TX (Texas Farm Bureau Insurance Shootout)	FOX	W 63–34	69,188
November 23	7:00 p.m.	at No. 11 Oklahoma State	No. 3	Boone Pickens Stadium; Stillwater, OK (College GameDay)	ABC	L 17–49	60,218
November 30	2:30 p.m.	at TCU	No. 9	Amon G. Carter Stadium; Fort Worth, TX (rivalry)	ESPN2	W 41–38	43,568
December 7	2:30 p.m.	No. 23 Texas	No. 9	Floyd Casey Stadium; Waco, TX (rivalry)	FOX	W 30–10	51,728
January 1	7:50 p.m.	vs. No. 15 UCF*	No. 6	University of Phoenix Stadium; Glendale, AZ (Fiesta Bowl)	ESPN	L 42–52	65,172
*Non-conference game; ^{†}Homecoming; Rankings from AP Poll released prior to the game; All times are in Central time

== Game summaries ==
=== Wofford ===
	1	2	3	4	Total
Terriers	0	0	3	0	3
Bears	28	10	28	3	69

Baylor opened its final season in Floyd Casey Stadium at home against the Wofford Terriers, a late addition to the 2013 schedule after SMU canceled their 2013 matchup against the Bears. In keeping with the Bears' fast-paced reputation, Baylor dashed out to a 28–0 lead in the first quarter with touchdown rushes by Lache Seastrunk and Glasco Martin IV, an Antwan Goodley touchdown reception from Bryce Petty, and an interception returned for a score by defensive lineman Chris McAllister. Seastrunk would add a second touchdown rush in the second quarter and finished the night with 111 rushing yards. Petty also added another passing touchdown, this time to Tevin Reese, and finished with 290 passing yards in his first career start. In backup duty, running back Shock Linwood rushed for a 19-yard score, and quarterback Seth Russell accounted for two more touchdowns, one passing and one rushing. Baylor's defense shut down the Terrier's triple-option attack, limiting Wofford to 173 rushing yards on the night, forcing three turnovers, allowing no touchdowns, and giving up only a field goal in the 3rd quarter.

Baylor's 69 points surpassed the school's modern-era single-game scoring record, a 68–13 victory over Northwestern State in 2009, and were the most points scored since an 88–0 victory in 1929 over Stephen F. Austin.

=== Buffalo ===
	1	2	3	4	Total
Bulls	13	0	0	0	13
#23 Bears	28	28	7	7	70

One week after playing creditably against #2 Ohio State in Columbus, the Buffalo Bulls traveled to Waco to take on the #23 Baylor Bears. Buffalo drew first blood, capitalizing on a 54-yard completion from Joe Licata to Alex Neutz on the first play from scrimmage and subsequently scoring on a 1-yard Branden Oliver rush. Later in the 1st quarter, Buffalo would score once more, while Baylor would score 4 touchdowns in 4 drives, the lengthiest of which took 1:16 of gametime. The Baylor defense would not allow another Buffalo score the rest of the game, forcing two turnovers and accounting for 7 of Baylor's 56 first-half points when linebacker Bryce Hager returned a fumble 91 yards for a touchdown. Lache Seastrunk added to his resume with 150 rushing yards and 3 rushing touchdowns, while Bryce Petty rushed for a touchdown and passed for 338 yards and 2 touchdowns to Tevin Reese and Antwan Goodley. The barrage of Baylor points subsided in the 2nd half: in the 3rd quarter Shock Linwood posted his second rushing touchdown of the day, and in backup duty Seth Russell completed a touchdown pass to Jay Lee in the 4th quarter.

After having set a modern-era school scoring record the previous week against Wofford, the Bears topped that record by 1 point, scoring 70 against the Buffalo Bulls. The game also saw Baylor post a school-record 781 total yards of offense and score a modern-era school-record 56 points in the first half. The Bears have not posted less than 400 yards of offense in a game since the 2011 season and have scored 40+ points in 16 of their last 19 games. Individually, Lache Seastrunk extended his streak of consecutive games with 100+ rushing yards to 6, both a school record and the nation's longest active streak.

=== Louisiana-Monroe ===
	1	2	3	4	Total
Warhawks	0	7	0	0	7
#20 Bears	35	14	21	0	70

Baylor continued its torrid offensive pace against Louisiana-Monroe. After winning a hard-fought game in Monroe the year before, the Bears put the game out of reach quickly, racking up 21 offensive and 14 defensive points (interceptions returned by cornerback Joe Williams and safety Terrell Burt) in the first quarter to become the first FBS or FCS team in the BCS era to score 28+ points in the first quarters of three consecutive games. Bryce Petty contributed to all of the offensive points in the 1st quarter with two touchdown passes (to Antwan Goodley and Tevin Reese) and a 2-yard touchdown rush. Goodley would catch his second touchdown pass of the day from Petty in the 2nd quarter before ULM scored their only points of the day, a 9-yard touchdown pass from Kolton Browning that made the score 42–7. Thereafter the scoreboard belonged to the Bears: Clay Fuller caught Petty's 4th touchdown pass of the day late in the 2nd quarter, and early in the 3rd Lache Seastrunk picked up 75 of his 156 rushing yards on the day with a touchdown rush. Shock Linwood added a 10-yard rushing touchdown, and backup quarterback Seth Russell found Levi Norwood for a 65-yard touchdown midway through the 3rd for the final points of the game.

With the win, Baylor became the first team since LSU in 1930 to score 60+ points in its first three games of the season. After breaking school records for points scored and yards gained in their previous game against Buffalo, the Bears matched those records exactly with another 70 points and 781 total offensive yards. The victory extended Baylor's streak of games with more than 400 yards of total offense to 30, the longest current streak in the nation. Individually, Bryce Petty finished with a career-high 351 yards passing and has thrown for 300+ yards and at least 2 touchdowns in all three career starts. Before Petty exited in the 3rd quarter with the game well in hand, the Bears scored touchdowns on 7 of 10 offensive drives; those scoring drives combined took a total of 6 minutes. Lache Seastrunk extended his streak of games with 100+ rushing yards to 7, the nation's current longest streak.

=== West Virginia ===
	1	2	3	4	Total
Mountaineers	7	7	7	21	42
#17 Bears	28	28	10	7	73

One year after the high-scoring first meeting of the two programs in Morgantown, the Bears and Mountaineers renewed their incipient rivalry in Waco. The superlative performance of the Baylor offense continued in record-setting fashion as the Bears yet again scored 28 points in the first quarter and then added another 4 touchdowns in the second. QB Bryce Petty accounted for 3 of the 1st quarter touchdowns, 2 passing (to Antwan Goodley and Tevin Reese) and 1 rushing; Lache Seastrunk posted the other touchdown of the 1st quarter on an 80-yard rush. All four Baylor touchdowns in the 2nd quarter came on the ground: Seastrunk added a second touchdown on a 19-yard rush, Shock Linwood added a scoring rush to his season totals, and Glasco Martin IV returned from an ankle injury in fine fashion, punching in two scores from the 2 yard line. In the first half Baylor's defense allowed only one WVU touchdown, a Clint Trickett pass to Kevin White; WVU's other touchdown of the first half came when the Mountaineers recovered a muffed punt in the endzone. In the second half Baylor went to its backups on offense and defense, with RB Devin Chafin and QB Seth Russell posting rushing touchdowns and Aaron Jones kicking a field goal to bring the final Baylor score to 73. The Mountaineers scored one touchdown early in the 3rd quarter on a rush by RB Charles Sims, West Virginia QB Paul Millard passed for two touchdowns in the 4th quarter, and the WVU defense accounted for one final touchdown, returning one of Russell's two interceptions on the day for a score.

In advancing to 4–0 for the first time since 1991, Baylor finished the day with 864 yards of total offense, breaking the Big 12 record (807 yards) held by WVU (set by the Mountaineers against the Bears in their previous meeting). Of that yardage, 369 came in the first quarter, and 617 came in the first half; both totals represent the most by a team in a single quarter and in a first half, respectively, in the last decade. The 73 points scored by Baylor set a Big 12 record for a head-to-head Big 12 matchup and again broke the school's modern-era scoring record. Baylor became the only team to score at least 66 points in 4 consecutive games based on data kept since 1980 and posted at least 28 points in the first quarter of their fourth straight game; no FBS or FCS team had scored 28 points or more in the first quarter of three consecutive games since 1996. With their 4th consecutive game of 60+ points, the Bears closed to within 1 game of the streak set by Oklahoma in 2008 of five such consecutive games.

Individually, Bryce Petty completed 17 of 25 attempts for 347 yards, 2 touchdowns, and 1 interception. Petty has thrown for at least 300 yards and 2 touchdowns in all four of his career starts, and he added 23 rushing yards and a rushing touchdown to finish with 370 total yards and 3 touchdowns. Lache Seastrunk assured his 8th consecutive game of more than 100 yards rushing in the first quarter; he finished with 172 yards on 15 carries. Through the first 4 games of the season, Seastrunk has averaged 11.1 yards per carry. Tevin Reese's 61 yard touchdown reception represented his 18th 40+ yard touchdown reception, the most in the BCS era for an FBS receiver.

=== @ Kansas State ===
	1	2	3	4	Total
#15 Bears	7	14	0	14	35
Wildcats	0	10	15	0	25

In their first road game of the season, the Baylor Bears traveled to Manhattan, KS to take on the Kansas State Wildcats. Prior to the game, Baylor had never won at Kansas State, and once again Kansas State proved a tough test for the Bears, holding Baylor to its lowest offensive output of the season.

Baylor received the ball to open the game and scored on a 12-play, 59 yard drive that was kept alive by a crucial penalty on KSU defender Randall Evans, who hit QB Bryce Petty out of bounds on a 3rd and 11 play. The Wildcats drove deep into Baylor territory on their ensuing drive but turned the ball over on downs inside the Bears' 10-yard line. After then forcing a Baylor punt, Kansas State embarked upon a drive that left them on the Baylor 1 yard line at the close of the 1st quarter. Wildcat QB Daniel Sams then punched the ball in for a touchdown on the first play of the 2nd quarter to tie the game at 7–7. After the next Baylor and KSU possessions stalled, the Wildcats pinned Baylor on the Bears' 5 yard line with a Mark Krause punt. Two plays later Bryce Petty found Tevin Reese for a 93-yard touchdown reception to put the Bears back in the lead. After Kansas State settled for a field goal on their next possession, Petty hit Antwan Goodley for a 72-yard touchdown and the teams entered the half with Baylor leading 21–10.

Kansas State, under the guidance of veteran coach Bill Snyder, refused to panic in the 2nd half. The Wildcats received the ball to open the half and drove to set up a field goal to cut Baylor's lead to 8; during this drive Kansas State used two of their three second-half timeouts. On the subsequent Baylor drive, Kansas State forced a punt which the Wildcats then blocked to set up a 19-yard touchdown drive; Daniel Sams again rushed in for the touchdown. KSU attempted a 2-point conversion which failed; crucially, Sams was forced to use Kansas State's third and final timeout prior to the 2-point attempt at 6:54 in the 3rd quarter. Two plays into the ensuing Baylor possession Bryce Petty was sacked and fumbled. The Wildcats recovered the ball and Daniel Sams once more shouldered the load, rushing in for another score to give KSU the lead 25–21. Again Kansas State went for two, and again the Wildcats failed to convert. Trailing in the 2nd half for the first time all season, Baylor answered with a 5 play, 71-yard touchdown drive highlighted by Tevin Reese's second TD catch of the day, this time a 54-yard reception from Petty. Two possessions later, with Baylor still leading 28–25, the Wildcats drove into Baylor territory again; however, the drive stalled and KSU kicker Jack Cantele missed a 41-yard field goal which would have tied the game. After Baylor's subsequent drive ended in a punt, Kansas State took possession at their own 20 yard line. Daniel Sams rushed for an 8-yard gain on 1st down, but Bears safety Ahmad Dixon intercepted Sams on the next play to set up a 39-yard Baylor scoring drive. RB Glasco Martin IV picked up all 39 of those yards on 5 rushing attempts. With 1:16 left in the game and no timeouts remaining, the Wildcats drove into Baylor territory on their final possession, but Bears lineman Chris McAllister sacked KSU QB Jake Waters on the penultimate play of the game, and the Baylor defense forced an incomplete pass as time expired to preserve a 35–25 victory.

With the victory, Baylor moved to 5–0 for the first time since 1991. Following the game, the Bears moved to #12 in the AP Poll, their highest ranking in the Art Briles era and their highest ranking in that poll since October 1991, when Baylor was ranked #8. In the Coaches' Poll, Baylor was also ranked #12, tying the Bears' high mark in that poll set at the end of the 2011 season. With Oklahoma being upset in the Red River Shootout by the Texas Longhorns on the same weekend, Baylor also became the highest ranking Big 12 team in both polls for the first time in league history.

Bryce Petty finished the day with 342 passing yards, 3 passing touchdowns, and a rushing touchdown. Tevin Reese added two more 40+ yard touchdown receptions to bring his career total to 20 such touchdowns, and Reese finished as the Bears' leading receiver with 184 yards on the day. On an uncharacteristically quiet day for the Baylor offense, Lache Seastrunk saw his streak of consecutive 100+ rushing yards games snapped; he finished with 54 yards on the ground. Glasco Martin IV finished as Baylor's top rusher with 70 yards and a touchdown. Defensively, Ahmad Dixon tallied his 4th career interception, Chris McAllister had his 11th career sack, and linebacker Bryce Hager recorded a career-high 18 tackles with 1 sack.

=== Iowa State ===
	1	2	3	4	Total
Cyclones	0	0	0	7	7
#12 Bears	17	20	14	20	71

Back in Waco after their first road game of the season, the Baylor Bears hosted Iowa State as part of the nation's oldest Homecoming celebration. Baylor received the ball to open the game and the Cyclones forced an uncharacteristic punt from the Bears on the opening drive. The Bears would, however, shortly resume their offensive fireworks, scoring on each of their next eight drives: during that eight drive stretch Lache Seastrunk provided two rushing touchdowns, Bryce Petty rushed for one touchdown, Antwan Goodley received two touchdown passes from Petty, and Aaron Jones kicked three field goals, including a 51-yarder to end the first half. Baylor would ultimately score 64 unanswered points behind a scoring punt return from Levi Norwood, a 40-yard rushing touchdown from backup QB Seth Russell, and a 21-yard rushing touchdown from backup RB Devin Chafin before Iowa State found the endzone with 47 seconds left in the game. The Bears would immediately answer, as Corey Coleman returned the ensuing kickoff 97 yards for a touchdown to give Baylor its 4th game of the season with 70 or more points scored.

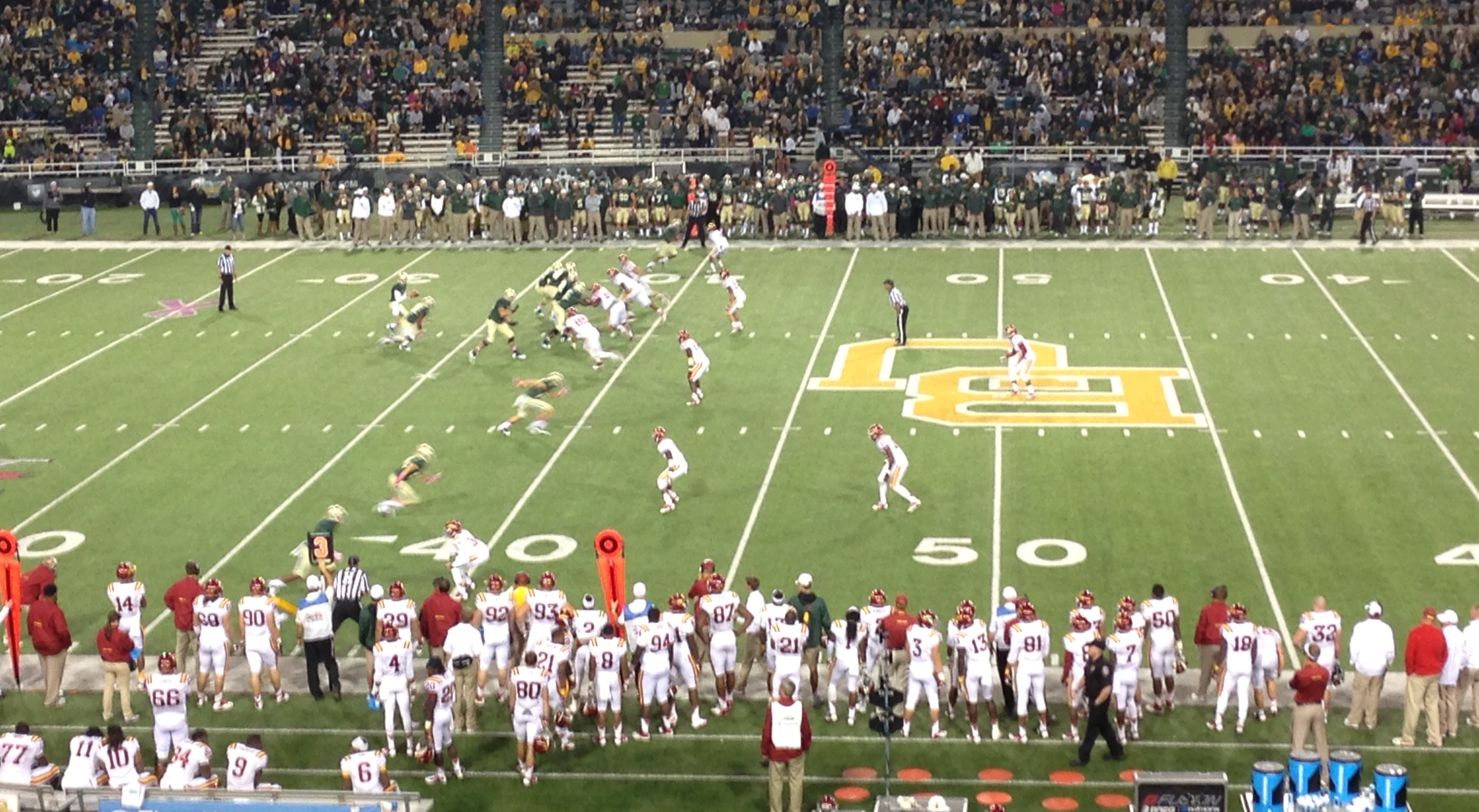
Gameplay during the second half of Baylor's 2013 Homecoming game against Iowa State.

Individually, Bryce Petty continued his streak of games with 300 or more passing yards and two or more passing touchdowns; he finished with 342 yards passing, two passing touchdowns, and one rushing touchdown. After having his streak of consecutive games with 100+ rushing yards broken against Kansas State, Lache Seastrunk posted 112 rushing yards and two rushing touchdowns. Kicker Aaron Jones successfully converted his 155th consecutive point-after attempt, a school record. Defensively, Sam Holl and Joe Williams recorded interceptions and Chris McAllister posted his 12th and 13th career sacks.

As a team Baylor recorded 714 yards of total offense, its 4th 700+ yard game of the season and 33rd consecutive game with more than 400 offensive yards dating back to the Bears' Alamo Bowl appearance in 2011. On the other side of the ball, the Bears' defense held Iowa State to only 174 yards of total offense. The 64-point margin of victory was the Bears' largest ever in conference play, including Baylor's stint in the Southwest Conference. The win represented Baylor's 10th consecutive win, which tied a school record set over the 1936–37 seasons; at the time, this streak was tied with Alabama for the nation's 2nd longest win streak. The undefeated start to the season marked the first time since the Bears' conference-winning season of 1980 that Baylor was 6–0, and the Bears advanced to 3–0 in conference play for the first time since the formation of the Big 12. With the win, the Bears became bowl eligible for the 4th consecutive year for the first time in school history.

During the weekend, half of the teams ranked above #12 Baylor in the AP and Coaches' polls suffered losses, including #11 South Carolina (to Tennessee), #9 UCLA (to #13 Stanford), #8 Louisville (to UCF), #7 Texas A&M (to #24 Auburn), #6 LSU (to Ole Miss), and #3 Clemson (to #5 Florida State). Following the weekend's games, Baylor rose to #6 in the AP poll and #5 in the Harris and Coaches' polls. In the first edition of the season's BCS standings released that week, Baylor was ranked #8, the program's highest BCS ranking ever (the previous high mark was set in the final BCS standings of 2011, when the Bears were ranked #12 prior to their Alamo Bowl victory).

=== @ Kansas ===
	1	2	3	4	Total
#6 Bears	21	17	14	7	59
Jayhawks	0	0	7	7	14

In Kansas for the second time in three weekends, Baylor took on the Kansas Jayhawks in their first game after receiving a top 10 ranking. After Kansas forced punts on the Bears' first two offensive possessions, Baylor went on to score on 7 of their 9 subsequent drives. The Bears racked up 500 yards of offense and took at 38–0 lead into the half behind two touchdown receptions by Tevin Reese from Bryce Petty; three touchdown rushes, one each by Petty, Lache Seastrunk, and Glasco Martin IV; and a field goal from Aaron Jones. Petty would add a third touchdown pass to Corey Coleman in the 3rd quarter before Baylor began pulling its starters. In backup duty, Shock Linwood provided the final two Baylor touchdowns of the day with rushes of 4 and 68 yards for scores. The defense shut out the Jayhawk offense in the first half; Kansas would eventually get on the scoreboard with a 22-yard rush off an option pitch in the 3rd quarter and would add a passing touchdown in the 4th.

Bryce Petty finished the day with 430 yards passing, 3 passing touchdowns, and a rushing touchdown. Seastrunk again rushed for more than 100 yards, finishing with 109 yards and a touchdown. Tevin Reese's touchdown receptions moved him to 3rd most in Baylor history with 24; he had averaged 50.6 yards per touchdown reception over his career to date. Defensive end Chris McAllister recorded his 14th career sack to move into a tie for 2nd most all-time for Baylor, 1 short of the record held by Daryl Gardner.

With their 11th consecutive win, the Bears set a new school record, breaking the 76-year-old record of 10 consecutive wins set over the 1936–37 seasons. The streak represented the 3rd longest in the nation at the time, behind Ohio State (19) and Alabama (12). The 7–0 start is only the second such start in Baylor history, the previous coming during the Bears' 1980 SWC championship season. Following the win, Baylor moved to #5 in the AP Poll, the Bears' highest ranking in that poll since being ranked #3 during the 1953 season. Baylor remained at #5 in the Coaches' Poll, moved to #6 in the BCS rankings, and remained the highest-ranked Big 12 team in the polls.

=== No. 12 Oklahoma ===
	1	2	3	4	Total
No. 12 Sooners	0	5	7	0	12
No. 5 Bears	3	21	10	7	41

Featuring two BCS top-10 match-ups (No. 3 Oregon at No. 5 Stanford and No. 10 Oklahoma at No. 6 Baylor), the night of November 7 was tabbed by some in the media as the biggest Thursday night in college football history. The first quarter and a half of the Baylor–Oklahoma ballgame proved to be a low-scoring, defensive struggle. Baylor won the coin toss and elected to receive; the Bears' first offensive possession ended in a punt. Baylor's defense subsequently forced a 3-and-out, and Aaron Jones put the Bears ahead with a 29-yard field goal on Baylor's second possession of the game. The Bears again forced a Sooners 3-and-out on Oklahoma's next possession, but Baylor's ensuing drive was stopped by the Oklahoma defense. Following a Spencer Roth punt, the Sooners took possession at their own 29 yard line. Although Oklahoma could not pick up a first down against the Baylor defense, the Sooners nonetheless found themselves with first down and goal from the Baylor 7-yard line following 53 penalty yards against Baylor; 38 of those yards came on a single play in which KJ Morton was flagged for targeting and Ahmad Dixon was hit with two flags for unsportsmanlike conduct. Baylor's defense subsequently turned in a goal-line stand, resisting two Blake Bell rushes from inside the Bears' 2-yard line. KJ Morton (whose targeting ejection had been overturned on review) brought Bell down on fourth and goal to force the turnover on downs. However, after Baylor's offense took possession under the shadow of their own goalposts, the Sooner defense put up Oklahoma's first points of the game two plays later, sacking QB Bryce Petty in the endzone for a safety. Jalen Saunders returned the ensuing Baylor free kick to the Bears' 12 yard line, but the Baylor defense again stood firm, forcing a 3-and-out and holding the Sooners to a field goal that gave Oklahoma its first lead of the game. Both teams would end their next possessions with missed field goals before Baylor scored the first touchdown of the night on a 5-yard Bryce Petty rush. Oklahoma would be forced to punt on their next possession and the ensuing 93-yard Baylor drive would end with a second rushing touchdown from Petty. On the Sooners' next play from scrimmage, linebacker Eddie Lackey picked off Blake Bell to set up a touchdown pass from Petty to Antwan Goodley with 13 seconds remaining in the 2nd quarter. The teams entered the half with Baylor leading 24–5.

Oklahoma received the ball to start the second half; the Sooners' first two possessions of the second half ended in punts, as did Baylor's first. Petty then found Levi Norwood in the end zone for a 17-yard touchdown pass to put Baylor ahead 31–5 before Oklahoma scored its only touchdown of the game on a 10-yard pass from Bell to Roy Finch. On the next Baylor possession, Aaron Jones kicked his second field goal of the night to extend the Bears' lead to 34–12, and the Baylor defense forced another turnover on downs on the Sooners' next possession. Two offensive series later, Petty again hit Antwan Goodley for a touchdown, this time a 25-yard reception. The Bears' defense subsequently halted Oklahoma's final two offensive drives, intercepting Bell once more and preserving the 41–12 victory.

Baylor's victory came despite multiple injuries, most significantly a dislocated wrist suffered by WR Tevin Reese, which forced him to miss the rest of the regular season. Guard Cyril Richardson exited the game briefly in the third quarter. RBs Glasco Martin IV and Lache Seastrunk suffered knee and groin injuries, respectively, which caused them to miss much of the game. Filling in for the injured RBs, Shock Linwood shouldered the load of Baylor's ground game, racking up 182 rushing yards. Bryce Petty was held to under 300 passing yards for the first time all season, finishing with 204 yards through the air; however, he accounted for all five of Baylor's touchdowns, rushing for two scores and throwing three TD passes to Antwan Goodley and Levi Norwood. Defensively, Eddie Lackey and Demetri Goodson recorded their 5th and third career interceptions, respectively.

Baylor recorded 459 yards of total offense, extending their streak of games with 400 or more offensive yards to 35, the longest in the nation at that time. The Bears' defense limited Oklahoma to 87 rushing yards on the night and forced 6 three-and-outs against Oklahoma; coming into the game, the Baylor defense averaged 7 three-and-outs forced per game, good for first in the nation. With Stanford defeating Oregon later on Thursday night, Baylor moved to No. 4 in the AP and Coaches' polls and attained a No. 5 BCS ranking.

=== Vs. Texas Tech ===
	1	2	3	4	Total
Red Raiders	20	7	7	0	34
#4 Bears	21	14	21	7	63

A week after the program's second-ever win over Oklahoma, undefeated Baylor faced Texas Tech in Cowboys Stadium in the 5th neutral-site game of their rivalry. Playing inspired football, the Red Raiders received the ball first and quickly attained a 14-point lead behind a pair of touchdown passes to TE Jace Amaro (the first from RB Kenny Williams, and the second from QB Baker Mayfield) on their opening offensive possessions. Baylor's offense cut the deficit to 7 on its second possession when QB Bryce Petty hit WR Levi Norwood for a 40-yard touchdown pass, but Texas Tech immediately went back up 20–7 when Mayfield found WR Eric Ward in the end zone for a 5-yard touchdown reception. However, Red Raider kicker Ryan Bustin missed the PAT, and the Texas Tech lead remained at 13. The Bears' offense stalled on their subsequent possession, but the Baylor defense forced a three-and-out on the Red Raiders' ensuing drive and Levi Norwood returned a Ryan Erxleben punt 48 yards for a touchdown to pull Baylor to within 6. The next Texas Tech possession was cut short by an athletic interception at the line of scrimmage by blitzing cornerback KJ Morton, setting up a 1-play Baylor scoring drive when Petty hit WR Antwan Goodley for a 31-yard touchdown. The next Texas Tech and Baylor possessions would end in a punt and a missed field goal, respectively. Following Aaron Jones' missed field goal, Baker Mayfield was sacked on the Red Raiders' first play from scrimmage and fumbled the ball; S Ahmad Dixon recovered the fumble to set up a 43-yard Baylor scoring drive capped by a 3-yard Devin Chafin touchdown rush. Texas Tech's subsequent drive ended in a punt, but the Red Raiders forced a Bryce Petty fumble at the Baylor 13 yard line and scored on a 3rd Mayfield touchdown pass to make the score 28–27 in favor of the Bears. Baylor again answered with a big play, this time a 58-yard touchdown reception by Norwood from Petty, and the teams entered the half with Baylor leading 35–27.

Baylor received the ball to open the 2nd half and extended its lead on a Bryce Petty keeper on a read option from the 6 yard line. After Texas Tech turned the ball over on downs on its ensuing drive, the Bears went ahead 49–27 on Devin Chafin's second TD rush of the night, this time a 47-yard scoring run. Two possessions later, Mayfield would throw his 4th touchdown pass of the night, this time to Reginald Davis, to make the score 49–34. That would prove to be the Red Raiders' final points of the night, however; Petty and RB Shock Linwood would each add rushing touchdowns for the Bears to make the final score 63–34.

Petty finished the night with 335 passing yards, 3 passing touchdowns, and two rushing touchdowns. With starting RBs Martin and Seastrunk out, Shock Linwood posted 187 yards and a touchdown on 29 carries. Devin Chafin rushed for 100 yards and 2 touchdowns, marking the third game of the season that Baylor had multiple 100-yard rushers in one game. Kicker Aaron Jones broke the NCAA record of career PATs made (253), finishing the night with 260; he ended the evening with 419 career points, further extending his school record. Levi Norwood became the first Baylor player to record 2 punt returns for TD and finished with 156 receiving yards and an additional two receiving touchdowns. CB KJ Morton recorded his 6th career interception to go with a forced fumble, a sack, and 9 tackles including 3 tackles-for-loss.

The victory extended Baylor's school-record streak of 13 consecutive wins and took the Bears to 9–0 on the season for the first time in school history. In amassing 675 total offensive yards, Baylor also extended its streak of consecutive games with more than 400 total offensive yards to 36, the longest in the nation at the time. Following the win, Baylor leapfrogged unbeaten Ohio State in the AP Poll to attain a #3 ranking, matching the program's highest-ever ranking in that poll (1953), and remained at #4 in the Coaches' Poll. Baylor also advanced in the BCS rankings to #4, displacing Stanford after the Cardinal suffered their second loss of the season at unranked Southern Cal.

=== @ #11 Oklahoma State ===
	1	2	3	4	Total
#3 Bears	0	3	0	14	17
#11 Cowboys	7	7	21	14	49

Baylor's winning streak came to an end at the hands of Oklahoma State on a frigid night in Stillwater, OK. After both teams' opening drives stalled, the Bears drove deep into Oklahoma State territory behind a Bryce Petty run which saw him stumble at the OSU 1-yard line. That stumble would prove fatal when the Cowboys forced a fumble at the goalline from Shock Linwood two plays later. Oklahoma State subsequently put together a 99-yard scoring drive to go ahead 7–0, which score would hold until midway through the second quarter when the Cowboys tacked on a second touchdown. Baylor put together a drive at the end of the first half to set up an Aaron Jones field goal as time expired, and the teams went into the half with the Cowboys leading 14–3.

Oklahoma State opened the second half with a 76-yard touchdown drive to increase their lead to 21–3; the Cowboys would force a Baylor turnover on downs and immediately score again to hand the Bears a 25-point deficit with just over 10 minutes remaining in the 3rd quarter. The high-flying Baylor offense continued to struggle on its ensuing drives, fumbling once more and turning the ball over on downs twice before Oklahoma State would again strike to make the score 35–3 at the end of the 3rd quarter. Baylor would finally put together a scoring drive to open the 4th when Petty found Antwan Goodley for a 24-yard touchdown pass, and the Bears' offense looked to cut the Oklahoma State lead even further on their next drive, taking the ball to the Oklahoma State 2-yard line. However, a botched snap was recovered by Cowboy CB Tyler Patmon and returned 78 yards for a touchdown. Both teams would add a passing touchdown late in the 4th quarter, and Oklahoma State ran out the final two minutes of the game on their final possession to drop the Bears to 9–1 on the season with a 49–17 loss.

The loss snapped Baylor's school record 13-game winning streak, including a school record 9-game Big 12 conference game winning streak. Despite the uncharacteristically poor showing of the Bears' offense, Baylor amassed 453 yards of total offense in the game to continue their 37-game streak of 400+ total offensive yard games. With 359 passing yards and 2 passing touchdowns, Bryce Petty had thrown for 200+ yards and 2+ touchdowns in all 10 career starts. Antwan Goodley finished the night with 118 receiving yards to move to 3rd place all-time in the school single-season receiving list. Defensively, Chris McAllister recorded his 15th career sack to move into a tie for the school record for career sacks.

With the defeat, the Bears lost control of their destiny in the Big 12, needing victories in their last two games and an Oklahoma State loss in Bedlam (the Cowboys' only remaining game of the regular season) to clinch an outright Big 12 title and automatic BCS bowl berth. Following the loss, Baylor dropped to #9 in the BCS and AP Poll rankings and to #8 in the Coaches' Poll.

=== @ TCU ===
	1	2	3	4	Total
#9 Bears	10	17	14	0	41
Horned Frogs	3	14	14	7	38

Looking to rebound from their first loss of the season, the 9th ranked Bears traveled to Fort Worth to face one of their most-played rivals, the TCU Horned Frogs. Baylor received the ball to open the game and drove to set up an Aaron Jones field goal to take the lead 3–0. TCU would tie the game at three before the Bears scored the first touchdown of the day, a diving 18-yard reception by Clay Fuller from Bryce Petty. After forcing a TCU punt, Aaron Jones would kick his second field goal of the day to give the Bears a 13–3 lead at the start of the second quarter. TCU would respond with 14 unanswered points to take a 17–13 lead with just over 6 minutes remaining in the first half. With the Baylor offense stymied by a stout TCU defense, the Bears defense rose to the challenge: a BJ Catalon fumble was recovered by DT Beau Blackshear at the TCU 1-yard line to set up a Petty rushing touchdown, and S Orion Stewart returned a Casey Pachall interception 82 yards for a touchdown. The Bears entered the half leading TCU 27–17.

The Baylor defense would continue its opportunistic play as LB Eddie Lackey intercepted Pachall on TCU's opening possession of the second half and returned the interception 54 yards for another Baylor defensive score. The Horned Frogs would immediately respond, however, again scoring 14 unanswered points to pull to within 3 of Baylor. Bryce Petty subsequently hit Levi Norwood for a 33-yard touchdown pass late in the 3rd quarter to make the Baylor lead 41–31. On the next Baylor possession, Petty threw only his second interception of the season to set up a Horned Frog touchdown on the opening play of the 4th quarter. The remainder of the game became a defensive struggle as neither offense proved able to successfully drive for a score. On their final possession with under two minutes remaining in the game, the Horned Frogs put together a 50-yard drive that brought them to first down at the Baylor 23 yard line, in range for a game-tying field goal and with time for multiple strikes to the end zone to score a game-winning touchdown. However, with 11 seconds remaining in the game, Pachall threw a pass to the end zone that was tipped by LB Sam Holl and intercepted by S Terrell Burt to seal the Baylor victory.

QB Bryce Petty again topped 200 passing yards and 2 passing touchdowns, finishing the day with 209 yards passing. Prior to throwing the 3rd quarter interception, Petty had attempted 229 passes without an interception, breaking Robert Griffin III's previous mark of 209 attempts. RB Lache Seastrunk, seeing his first action since the Oklahoma game, posted 94 yards rushing on 24 attempts. RB Shock Linwood had one carry for 7 yards, bringing his total yardage on the season to 848, breaking the Baylor freshman rushing record also formerly held by Robert Griffin III (843 yards in 2008). Defensively, S Orion Stewart, S Terrell Burt, and LB Eddie Lackey recorded their first, second, and sixth career interceptions, respectively.

The win moved Baylor to 10–1 on the season, marking only the second time in school history that the program had recorded a 10-win regular season (1980). The win in the 109th meeting of Baylor and TCU tied the programs' all-time record against each other at 51–51–7. The 609 points scored and 82 touchdowns scored on the season broke previous school records set in 2011. Following the victory, Baylor remained at #9 in the AP Poll and BCS rankings and advanced to #7 in the Coaches' Poll.

=== #23 Texas ===
	1	2	3	4	Total
#23 Longhorns	0	3	0	7	10
#9 Bears	3	0	17	10	30

In a clash of top 25 teams, the Baylor Bears and the Texas Longhorns faced off in the final game in the 64-season history of Floyd Casey Stadium. As both teams entered the game having only lost in conference play to Oklahoma State, the winner of the matchup was assured at least a share of the Big 12 championship. Shortly before kickoff, the announcement of the Oklahoma Sooners' 33–24 victory over Oklahoma State elicited cheers from both Baylor and Texas partisans, as Oklahoma's victory elevated the Baylor–Texas matchup to the de facto Big 12 championship game.

With temperatures at 24 degrees Fahrenheit at kickoff and hovering well below freezing for the entire game, both offenses sputtered in the first half. On their first possession, the Bears managed to drive to within the range of K Aaron Jones, who put the Bears ahead 3–0 with a 22-yard field goal. The Longhorns would do the same on their subsequent drive, but K Anthony Fera's 44-yard field goal attempt was blocked by DE Shawn Oakman. Baylor and Texas both turned the ball over on downs on their next possessions; Baylor would then miss a field goal and a Texas drive into Baylor territory would be turned away by a KJ Morton interception of a Case McCoy pass at the Baylor 10 yard line. In the second quarter, the teams would trade punts before Aaron Jones missed a second field goal attempt; the teams would again trade punts before Anthony Fera would post the final score of the first half, tying the game at 3–3 with a 42-yard field goal with 4:31 remaining in the half.

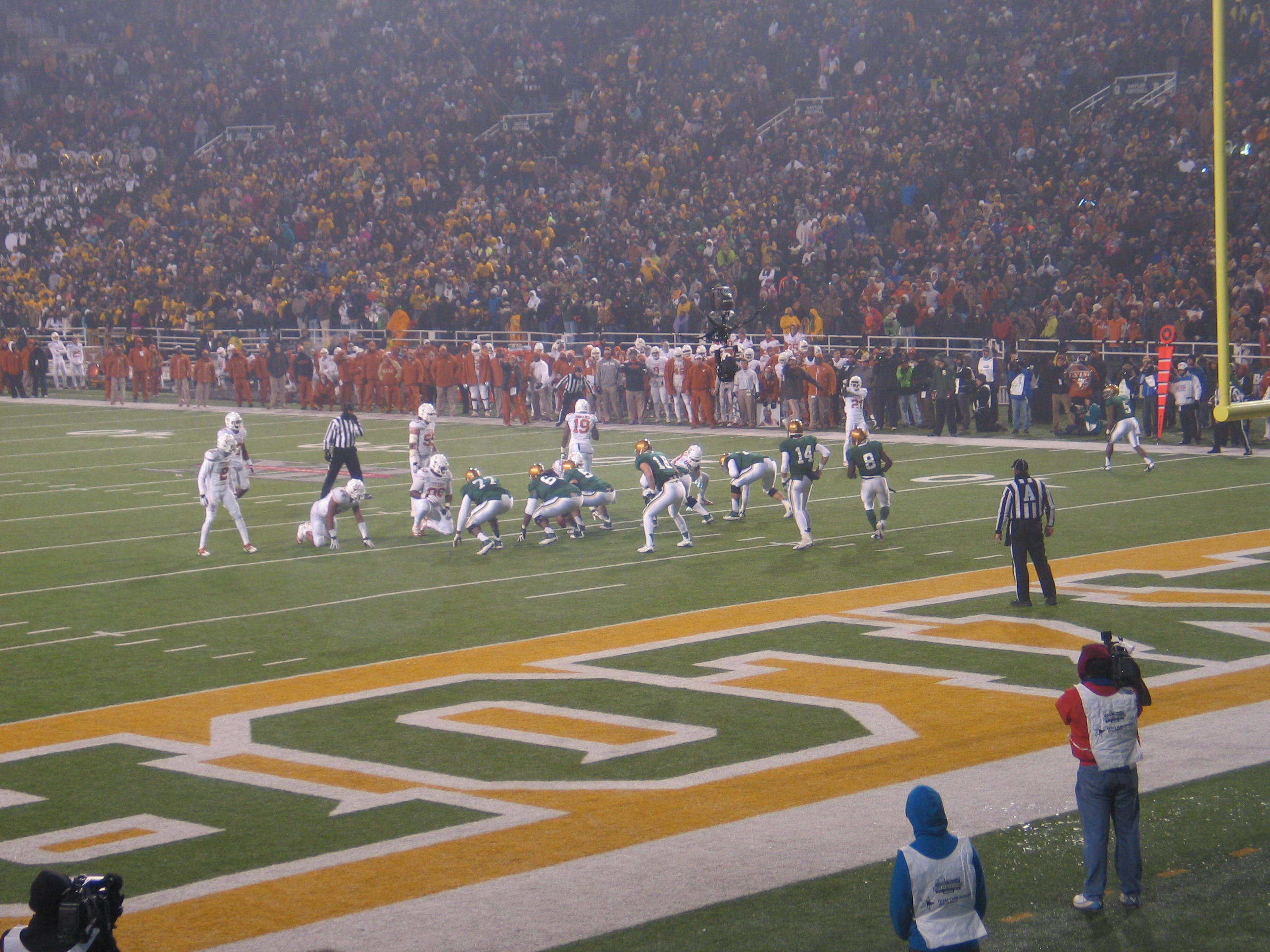
Gameplay during the 4th quarter of the 2013 Baylor-Texas game. Baylor wore uniforms inspired by the 1950 team, the first to play in Floyd Casey Stadium (then Baylor Stadium).

Baylor received the ball to open the second half and promptly put together a deliberate 14-play, 77-yard drive capped by an 11-yard, one-handed touchdown reception by WR Antwan Goodley from QB Bryce Petty. With S Ahmad Dixon eligible to play (Dixon was serving a one-half suspension for a targeting penalty committed during the third quarter of the TCU game), the Baylor defense forced a Longhorn punt, and the Bears again marched down the field for a second touchdown, the score this time coming on a 6-yard pass from Petty to WR Levi Norwood. The Baylor defense would again force a Texas punt, and the Bears offense would score for a third time on their third possession of the second half when Aaron Jones converted a 42-yard field goal. The score would remain 20–3 until early in the 4th quarter, when McCoy, scrambling in the backfield on a broken play, found RB Malcolm Brown in the back of the end zone for a 2-yard touchdown pass. The Bears would respond on their next drive with another field goal to make the score 23–10 in favor of Baylor. Both teams' ensuing drives would stall before Texas took possession with just over 5 minutes remaining, still down 13. The Longhorns drove into Baylor territory, but McCoy was again intercepted by CB KJ Morton, who returned the interception for an apparent touchdown. However, the score was overturned due to a penalty and Baylor took possession inside the red zone. On the next play from scrimmage, RB Glasco Martin IV broke free for an 18-yard touchdown rush to put the Bears ahead 30–10. That touchdown would prove to be the final scoring play in the history of Floyd Casey Stadium: the Baylor defense forced a Longhorn punt on Texas' final possession, and the Bears' offense ran out the clock to spark a celebration at midfield.

In his first regular season as the Bears' starting quarterback, Bryce Petty topped 200 yards passing and 2+ passing touchdowns in all 12 games. Petty finished the season 3rd in school single-season passing yards (3,844), 3rd in school single-season passing TDs (30), and 3rd in school single-season total offense (4,036). Glasco Martin finished the day with 102 yards on the ground and added a crucial 25-yard reception on a 3rd-and-11 play, his first reception of the year. His rushing touchdown was the 24th of his career, tying him for 5th on the school all-time rushing TD list. Antwan Goodley's touchdown reception was his 12th of the season, good for 2nd on the school single-season touchdown reception list behind Kendall Wright's 14 touchdown receptions in 2011. Aaron Jones set a single-season consecutive PAT conversion record with his 78th conversion of the season; Jones had made 185 consecutive PATs and moved to 2nd on the all-time NCAA career kicking points list with 447. KJ Morton's two interceptions were the 7th and 8th of his career.

The victory gave Baylor its first 11-win season in program history and guaranteed the Bears a share of the Big 12 championship; due to the Oklahoma State loss, Baylor ended the season as outright conference champions for the first time since winning the Southwest Conference in 1980. As sole Big 12 champion, Baylor also received its first BCS berth (to the Fiesta Bowl) and its first major bowl berth since the 1981 Cotton Bowl. Baylor closed its final season in Floyd Casey Stadium with a crowd of 51,728 to set an all-time Floyd Casey Stadium single-game record; records for total season attendance (321,639) and season average attendance (45,948) were also set during the 2013 campaign. The Bears posted a perfect 7–0 record at home during the 2013 season to bring the program's all-time record at Floyd Casey Stadium to 191–146–5.

=== 2014 Fiesta Bowl ===
	1	2	3	4	Total
#15 Knights	14	14	7	17	52
#6 Bears	7	13	8	14	42

The Bears were upset by the UCF Knights, who out gained them in total yards and won time of possession, despite Baylor winning the turnover battle three to one.

UCF was led by quarterback Blake Bortles, who was later drafted by the Jacksonville Jaguars with the #3 pick in the 2014 NFL draft.

== Rankings ==
Ranking movements Legend: ██ Increase in ranking ██ Decrease in ranking RV = Received votes
	Week																
Poll	Pre	1	2	3	4	5	6	7	8	9	10	11	12	13	14	15	Final
AP	RV	23	22	20	19	17	15	12	6	5	5	4	3	9	9	6	13
Coaches	RV	RV	22	19	18	16	15	12	5	5	5	4	4	8	7	5	13
Harris	Not released							13	5	5	5	4	4	9	9	6	Not released
BCS	Not released								8	6	6	5	4	9	9	6	Not released

== Depth chart ==
Defense

FS
Terrell Burt So.
Taion Sells Fr.
Anthony Webb So.

WLB	ILB	ILB	SLB
Eddie Lackey Sr.	⋅	⋅	⋅
Kendall Ehrlich Fr.(RS)	⋅	⋅	⋅
⋅	⋅	⋅	⋅

DS
Ahmad Dixon Sr.
Orion Stewart Fr.(RS)
⋅

CB
Demetri Goodson Sr.
KJ Morton Sr.
⋅

DE	NT	DE
Terrance Lloyd Sr.	⋅	Chris McAllister Sr.
Shawn Oakman So.	⋅	Jamal Palmer So.
KJ Smith Fr.	⋅	⋅

CB
Joe Williams Sr.
Xavien Howard Fr.(RS)
Ryan Reid Fr.(RS)

Offense

WR
Antwan Goodley
Tevin Reese
Jay Lee

WR
Levi Norwood
Robbie Rhodes
⋅

LT	LG	C	RG	RT
Spencer Drango So.	Cyril Richardson Sr.	Stefan Huber Sr.	Desmine Hilliard So.	Kelvin Palmer Sr.
Pat Colbert So.	LaQuan McGowan So.	Kyle Fuller Fr.(RS)	Kyle Fuller Fr.(RS)	Troy Baker Jr.
⋅	⋅	Tyler Edwards Jr.	Jason Osei Fr.(RS)	Tre'Von Armstead Fr.(RS)

WR
Clay Fuller
Lynx Hawthorne
⋅

WR
Corey Coleman
Brandon Brown
Cal Spangler

QB
Bryce Petty Jr.
Seth Russell Fr.(RS)
Andrew Frerking

RB
Lache Seastrunk Jr.
Glasco Martin IV Sr.
Devin Chafin
Shock Linwood Fr.(RS)
Johnny Jefferson

Special teams
PK Aaron Jones Sr.
PK Kyle Peterson So.
P Spencer Roth Jr.
P Chris Callahan Fr.
KR Clay Fuller Jr.
PR Levi Norwood Jr.
LS Zach Northern Sr.
H Brody Trahan Sr.
