= 2014 Fiesta Bowl (January) =

2014 Tostitos Fiesta Bowl
- BCS Bowl Game; 43rd Fiesta Bowl
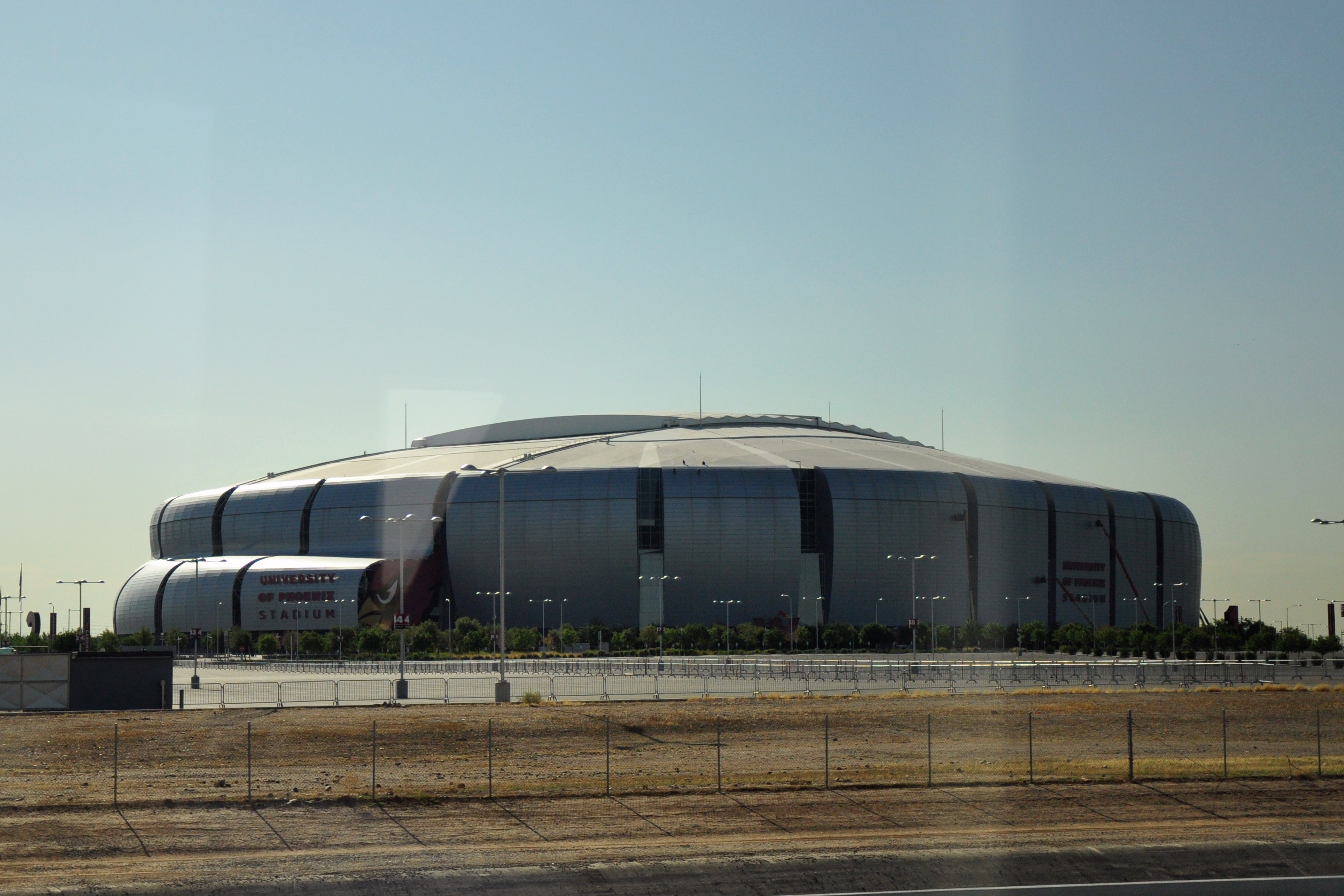
- University of Phoenix Stadium in Glendale, Arizona, hosted the Fiesta Bowl.
UCF Knights	Baylor Bears
(11–1)	(11–1)
The American	Big 12
52	42
Head coach: George O'Leary	Head coach: Art Briles
AP / Coaches / BCS; 15 / 15 / 15	AP / Coaches / BCS; 6 / 5 / 6
	1	2	3	4	Total
UCF	14	14	7	17	52
Baylor	7	13	8	14	42
- Date: January 1, 2014
- Season: 2013
- Stadium: University of Phoenix Stadium
- Location: Glendale, Arizona
- MVP: Offensive: Blake Bortles (QB – UCF); Defensive: Terrance Plummer (LB – UCF)
- Favorite: Baylor by 16½
- Referee: Tom Ritter (SEC)
- Halftime show: Bands from participants
- Attendance: 65,172
- Payout: US$24 million

United States TV coverage
- Network: ESPN, ESPN Deportes
- Announcers: ESPN: Sean McDonough (play-by-play); Chris Spielman (analyst); Shannon Spake (sideline reporter)
- Nielsen ratings: 6.6 (11.2 Million viewers)

The 2014 Fiesta Bowl was a college football bowl game that was played on Wednesday, January 1, 2014, at University of Phoenix Stadium in Glendale, Arizona. In this, the 43rd annual Fiesta Bowl, the Baylor Bears, champions of the Big 12 Conference, played the UCF Knights, champions of the American Athletic Conference. The game was broadcast live on ESPN at 6:30 p.m. MST. It was one of the 2013–14 bowl games that concluded the 2013 FBS football season. It was sponsored by the Tostitos snack food brand and was officially known as the Tostitos Fiesta Bowl.

UCF defeated Baylor by a score of 52–42, becoming the biggest underdog victors in BCS history. Baylor had gone into the game as a 16.5 point favorite. UCF was flagged for just 4 penalties totaling 40 yards.

== Teams ==
This was the first time Baylor and UCF played each other on the gridiron. The Baylor Bears went to the Fiesta Bowl as the Big 12 champion. UCF earned an automatic berth to a BCS game by winning The American (formerly the Big East). Per the rotation in place since the 2008 season, it was the Fiesta Bowl's turn to host the champion of the American, after the 2012 Orange Bowl and 2013 Sugar Bowl hosted the Big East champion in the last two seasons.

=== Baylor ===
Baylor arguably enjoyed its best season in school history. After being ranked as high as third in the nation, the Bears went on to a school-record 11 wins and their first-ever Big 12 title, their first outright conference title since winning their last outright Southwest Conference title in 1980. The Bears earned their first-ever appearance in the BCS, and their first major bowl of any sort since the 1981 Cotton Bowl Classic. Bryce Petty led the Bears to new heights completing 220 of 356 passes for 3,844 yards and 30 touchdowns with two interceptions.

=== UCF ===
UCF began its season five months after a postseason ban was overturned on appeal. The Knights, led by redshirt Junior Blake Bortles and head coach George O'Leary, won the American Athletic Conference football championship with an 11–1 (8–0) record. O'Leary, in his tenth season with UCF, led the Knights to their first eleven-win regular season (11–1), first perfect conference record (8–0), first win against a Big Ten opponent (Penn State), first win against a Top–10 team (No. 6 Louisville), third conference title (2007, 2010, 2013), and the program's first appearance in a major bowl. Bortles threw for 3,280 yards on 239 completions for 22 touchdowns and seven interceptions. The season saw six second half come-from-behind victories.

== Game summary ==
=== First quarter ===
UCF won the opening coin toss and elected to receive. Aaron Jones for Baylor kicked off, and it was received by William Stanback of the Knights who returned the ball 14 yards to the UCF 24 yard line. After a false start penalty on the first play of the game, the Knights drove 76 yards in six plays for the first touchdown of the game. All six plays were rushing plays, with quarterback Blake Bortles' 29-yard gain putting them in Baylor territory on the second play from scrimmage. Running back Storm Johnson capped off the drive with an 11-yard touchdown run.

Baylor's first possession was a 3-and-out. Quarterback Bryce Petty was sacked at his own 27 yard line on 3rd down, forcing the Bears to punt.

UCF's second drive began at the 49 yard line. The first play was a 34-yard completion from Bortles to Breshad Perriman to the Baylor 17. Four plays later, UCF was in the endzone with Storm Johnson's second rushing touchdown. UCF led 14-0 midway through the first quarter.

Baylor was forced to punt on their next possession, but managed to pin UCF at their own 10 yard line. UCF punted from their own endzone, giving Baylor excellent field position at the UCF 45. A 29-yard run by Lache Seastrunk set up the Bears inside the red zone, and Petty punched the ball into the endzone for Baylor's first touchdown.

=== Second quarter ===
After punting on their last three drives, the Knights were again pinned deep in their own territory. Baylor took over with 11:48 left in the half at their own 43 yard line. Antwan Goodley rushed for 22 yards to the UCF 35 yard line. Baylor went for it on 4th & 8 at the UCF 33. On a field that was mildly criticized by some as being slippery and loose, Petty lost his footing on the snap. He was tackled for a two-yard loss and turned the ball over on downs.

Three plays later, Blake Bortles' threw deep towards the endzone, but the pass was intercepted by Demetri Goodson at the Baylor 6 yard line. On the first play of UCF's next possession, Bortles' pass was tipped and intercepted by Eddie Lackey. Bryce Petty then connected to Levi Norwood for a 30-yard touchdown pass. The snap was botched on the extra point attempt, and the score was 14-13 in favor of UCF.

Baylor kicked off to UCF with 8:01 left in the half. Storm Johnson fumbled away the ball, the third turnover in three consecutive offensive plays for the Knights. With momentum tilting towards Baylor, Petty had the Bears at Knights 14 yard line. Petty's pass to the endzone was intercepted by Brandon Alexander, only the third interception thrown by Petty all season.

UCF started their next drive at the 20 yard line after the turnover. Baylor was called for pass interference, which advanced the Knights to midfield. Bortles passed to Rannell Hall, who broke free for a 50-yard touchdown, and a 21-13 UCF lead.

With just over five minutes left in the half, Bryce Petty led the Bears on an 8-play, 78-yard drive. Petty capped off the drive with an acrobatic 15-yard scramble over the goal line. Petty ran to the right, and was upended at the 2 yard line by a UCF defender, but flipped over and landed in the endzone for the touchdown. The deficit was trimmed to 21-20.

UCF faced 3rd down & 10 at the 49 yard line, when Baylor was called for another drive-extending pass interference call. Two plays later, Bortles threw to Rannell Hall, who scrambled for a 34-yard touchdown, and a 28-20 lead for the Knights.

In the final minute, Baylor drove to the UCF 28 yard line. Bears kicker Aaron Jones missed a 45-yard field goal attempt wide right as time expired. UCF took a 28-20 lead into halftime

=== Third quarter ===
After the explosive second quarter, the third quarter opened with both teams punting. Baylor's second possession of the second half went 68 yards for a touchdown. The drive was highlighted by a 50-yard pass from Petty to Jay Lee, who was downed inside the 1 yard line. A two-point conversion tied the score at 28-28.

UCF's next drive went 76 yards in 9 plays. For the third time, Baylor was called for pass interference on a third down play. Bortles found Breshard Perriman in the right side of the endzone for a 10-yard touchdown, and the Knights were back ahead by the score of 35-28.

=== Fourth quarter ===
UCF was driving into Baylor territory as the fourth quarter began. On the first play of the quarter, Bortles ran 22 yards to the Baylor 18. Two plays later, Bortles rolled out to the left, and scrambled for a 15-yard touchdown run. The Knights were up 42-28 with less than 14 minutes left.

Baylor took the next kickoff all the way to the 47 yard line. Lache Seastrunck rushed for 8 yards, and UCF was called for a facemask penalty, advancing the Bears to the UCF 30. Petty threw a 28-yard pass to Clay Fuller, then Glasco Martin ran for the touchdown.

With just over twelve minutes to go, Blake Bortles threw a 23-yard pass to Rannell Hall, advancing the Knights near midfield. Storm Johnson broke away for a 40-yard touchdown run, and the Knights were again back up by two scores. With just over 10 minutes to go, the Knights led 49-35.

UCF forced Baylor to punt, and on their own next possession, drove to the Baylor 20. Knights kicker Shawn Moffitt kicked a 36-yard field goal to put UCF up 52-35. The Knights had a three-score lead with less than five minutes to go.

Baylor managed a 13-play, 79-yard touchdown drive in the final minutes. The Knights defense was able to coerce the Bears into burning over four minutes off the clock; the touchdown was scored with only 1:15 left in the game. The Bears attempted an onside kick, but UCF's J.J. Worton effectively secured the victory by recovering the ball with little difficulty. Bortles took a knee twice to run out the clock.

== Scoring summary ==
Scoring summary

Quarter	Time	Drive			Team	Scoring information	Score	
Quarter	Time	Plays	Yards	TOP	Team	Scoring information	UCF	Baylor
1	11:24	6	76	3:36	UCF	Storm Johnson 11-yard touchdown run, Shawn Moffitt kick good	7	0
1	7:46	5	51	2:27	UCF	Storm Johnson 2-yard touchdown run, Shawn Moffitt kick good	14	0
1	3:49	5	45	0:41	Baylor	Bryce Petty 1-yard touchdown run, Aaron Jones kick good	14	7
2	8:01	2	32	0:25	Baylor	Levi Norwood 30-yard touchdown reception from Bryce Petty, Aaron Jones kick no good	14	13
2	5:05	5	80	2:07	UCF	Rannell Hall 50-yard touchdown reception from Blake Bortles, Shawn Moffitt kick good	21	13
2	2:55	8	78	2:05	Baylor	Bryce Petty 13-yard touchdown run, Aaron Jones kick good	21	20
2	0:44	9	83	2:07	UCF	Rannell Hall 34-yard touchdown reception from Blake Bortles, Shawn Moffitt kick good	28	20
3	10:18	7	68	2:22	Baylor	Bryce Petty 1-yard touchdown run, 2-point run good	28	28
3	5:38	9	76	4:35	UCF	Breshad Perriman 10-yard touchdown reception from Blake Bortles, Shawn Moffitt kick good	35	28
4	13:37	9	80	4:48	UCF	Blake Bortles 15-yard touchdown run, Shawn Moffitt kick good	42	28
4	12:16	4	53	1:12	Baylor	Glasco Martin 9-yard touchdown run, Aaron Jones kick good	42	35
4	10:26	4	75	1:50	UCF	Storm Johnson 40-yard touchdown run, Shawn Moffitt kick good	49	35
4	4:44	8	37	4:11	UCF	36-yard field goal by Shawn Moffitt	52	35
4	1:15	13	79	3:23	Baylor	Clay Fuller 9-yard touchdown reception from Bryce Petty, Aaron Jones kick good	52	42
"TOP" = time of possession. For other American football terms, see Glossary of American football.							52	42

=== Statistics ===
Statistics	UCF	Baylor
First downs	29	27
Total offense, plays – yards	75-556	85-550
Rushes-yards (net)	44-255 (5.8)	38-194 (5.1)
Passing yards (net)	301	356
Passes, Comp-Att-Int	20-31-2	30-47-1
Time of possession	34:47	25:13
Penalties - Yards	4-40	17-135
Field goals	1/1	0/1

== Future Fiesta Bowls ==
The game was part of the final year of the Bowl Championship Series (BCS). In 2015, the Fiesta Bowl became one of the six bowls that compose the College Football Playoff. That contest ended the Fiesta Bowl's 16-year tie-in with the Big 12; since 1999, the Big 12 champion had hosted the Fiesta Bowl when it is not playing in the national championship game. Starting with the 2014 season, the Big 12 champion will face the Southeastern Conference (home to two former Big 12 members) champion in the Sugar Bowl as part of the College Football Playoff. In most years the Fiesta Bowl is not a semifinal, it will attract two at-large teams.

The following Fiesta Bowl was played on New Year's Eve, which naturally was also in 2014. There therefore were two 2014 Fiesta Bowls, such thing has not happened since 1997, when they were played the same year.
