= Storm Johnson =

American football player (born 1992)

No. 27, 34, 36
- Position: Running back

Personal information
- Born: July 10, 1992 (age 34); Lithonia, Georgia, U.S.
- Listed height: 6 ft 0 in (1.83 m)
- Listed weight: 212 lb (96 kg)

Career information
- High school: Loganville (Loganville, Georgia)
- College: UCF
- NFL draft: 2014: 7th round, 222nd overall pick

Career history
- Jacksonville Jaguars (2014); Tampa Bay Buccaneers (2016)*; Miami Dolphins (2016–2017)*; Hamilton Tiger-Cats (2018)*; Saskatchewan Roughriders (2018)*; Orlando Apollos (2019)*
- * Offseason or practice squad member only

Awards and highlights
- First-team All-AAC (2013)

Career NFL statistics
- Rushing yards: 86
- Rushing average: 3.0
- Rushing touchdowns: 2
- Stats at Pro Football Reference

Storm Johnson (born July 10, 1992) is an American former professional football player who was a running back in the National Football League (NFL). He was selected by the Jacksonville Jaguars in the seventh round of the 2014 NFL draft. He played college football for the UCF Knights.

== Early life ==
Johnson attended Loganville High School in Loganville, Georgia, where he rushed for a school record 5,937 yards and 31 touchdowns. He earned first-team all-state honors by both the Atlanta Journal-Constitution and Associated Press, and was named the 2009 AAA Player of the Year by the AJC. He played his junior season at Buford High School in Buford, Georgia, where he rushed for 1,300 yards and 21 touchdowns. He was selected to play in the 2010 Under Armour All-America Game in St. Petersburg, Florida.

Considered a four-star recruit by Rivals.com, he was rated as the seventh best running back prospect of his class.

== College career ==
Johnson enrolled at the University of Miami in 2010, where he played in 10 games as a true freshman, rushing for 119 yards on nine carries (13.2 avg).

On May 17, 2011, Johnson announced he was leaving the university. One month later, on June 17, 2011, Johnson reported that he would transfer to the University of Central Florida, where he would play for the UCF Knights football team.

After redshirting in 2011 due to NCAA transfer rules, Johnson was the back-up to Latavius Murray in 2012. He finished second on the team with 507 yards on 113 carries (4.5 avg) and ran for four touchdowns, while catching 10 passes for 20 yards. In 2013, Johnson rushed for 1,139 yards on 213 carries (5.3 avg), while running for 14 touchdowns. He also caught 20 passes for 360 yards and three touchdowns, earning first-team All-AAC honors. In the 2014 Fiesta Bowl against Baylor, he rushed for 124 yards and three touchdowns, which tied an individual school record for a bowl game, helping lead the Knights to a 52–42 victory.

On January 6, 2014, Johnson announced he would be joining teammate Blake Bortles by foregoing his remaining eligibility and entering the 2014 NFL draft.

== Professional career ==
=== Jacksonville Jaguars ===
Johnson was reunited with Bortles when he was selected by the Jacksonville Jaguars in the seventh round (222nd overall) of the 2014 NFL draft. Johnson appeared in six games, rushing for 86 yards and two touchdowns.

Johnson was released by Jacksonville on September 4, 2015.

=== Tampa Bay Buccaneers ===
On April 25, 2016, Johnson signed with the Tampa Bay Buccaneers. On August 28, 2016, Johnson was waived by the Buccaneers.

=== Miami Dolphins ===
On November 8, 2016, Johnson was signed to the Miami Dolphins' practice squad. He signed a reserve/future contract with the Dolphins on January 10, 2017. He was waived on September 2, 2017.

=== Hamilton Tiger-Cats ===
On December 11, 2017, Johnson signed with the Hamilton Tiger-Cats of the Canadian Football League (CFL). After playing in the first preseason game with Hamilton, and recording 5 rushes for 48 yards, Johnson was released on June 3, 2018.

=== Saskatchewan Roughriders ===
On June 6, 2018, Johnson signed with the Saskatchewan Roughriders of the CFL, in time for their second preseason game. During that game, Johnson split reps with other former NFL running backs such as Zac Stacy, Tre Mason, and David Cobb. Johnson had 7 yards on two carries, and a catch for 4 yards, but Mason, who had only one touch all preseason, won out on the job in the end; Johnson was cut on June 10, 2018.

=== Orlando Apollos ===
In 2018, Johnson signed with the Orlando Apollos of the Alliance of American Football for the 2019 season. He was released January 4, 2019.
