= Chris Martin (offensive lineman) =

American gridiron football player (born 1990)

No. 55
- Position: Offensive tackle

Personal information
- Born: January 4, 1990 (age 36); Fort Walton Beach, Florida
- Listed height: 6 ft 5 in (1.96 m)
- Listed weight: 305 lb (138 kg)

Career information
- High school: Choctawhatchee (FL)
- College: UCF
- NFL draft: 2014: undrafted

Career history
- Houston Texans (2014)*; New England Patriots (2014)*; Houston Texans (2014)*; San Francisco 49ers (2014–2015)*; Miami Dolphins (2015)*; New England Patriots (2015)*; Buffalo Bills (2015)*; Miami Dolphins (2015)*; Buffalo Bills (2016)*; Ottawa Redblacks (2018); Orlando Apollos (2019); Ottawa Redblacks (2019)*
- * Offseason or practice squad member only
- Stats at Pro Football Reference

Chris Martin (born January 4, 1990) is an American former football offensive tackle. He was signed by the Houston Texans as an undrafted free agent in 2014. He played college football at University of Central Florida. Martin was a member of five different NFL franchises in three seasons before signing to play in the CFL.

== Personal life ==
A native of Fort Walton Beach, Florida, Martin attended Choctawhatchee High School and graduated in 2008.

== College career ==
Martin played at UCF from 2009-2013. He also played sparingly at tight end for the Knights.

== Professional career ==
=== Houston Texans ===
Martin originally signed with the Houston Texans as an undrafted free agent in 2014.

=== New England Patriots ===
Martin was signed to the New England Patriots practice squad in August 2014. He was released on October 13, 2014.

=== Houston Texans (II) ===
Martin was signed to the Houston Texans practice squad on Nov. 12, and he was later released on Nov. 25.

=== San Francisco 49ers ===
Martin was signed to the San Francisco 49ers practice squad in December 2014. On December 30, 2014, he was signed a future contract. On June 15, 2015, he was waived by the 49ers.

=== Miami Dolphins ===
Martin was signed by the Miami Dolphins on July 28, 2015. On August 16, 2015, he was waived by the Dolphins.

=== New England Patriots (II) ===
On August 18, 2015, Martin was claimed off waivers by the New England Patriots. On September 4, 2015, he was waived by the Patriots.

=== Buffalo Bills ===
Martin was signed to the Buffalo Bills practice squad in September 2015. On November 6, 2015, he was released by the Bills.

=== Miami Dolphins (II) ===
On November 18, 2015, Martin was signed to the Dolphins' practice squad. On November 24, 2015, he was released.

=== Buffalo Bills (II) ===
Martin was signed by the Bills. On September 2, 2016, he was released by the Bills as part of final roster cuts. He was re-signed to their practice squad on September 12. He was released from the practice squad on September 19.

=== Ottawa Redblacks ===
On May 24, 2018 the Ottawa Redblacks of the Canadian Football League (CFL) announced the signing of Martin.

=== Orlando Apollos ===
In 2018, Martin signed with the Orlando Apollos for the 2019 season.

=== Ottawa Redblacks ===
After the AAF ceased operations in April 2019, Martin re-signed with the Ottawa Redblacks on May 8, 2019.

On August 10, 2021, Martin would be featured in the documentary about the AAF, Alliances Broken. Here he would announce retirement from football.
