= Power conferences =

Group of top-level American college football conferences

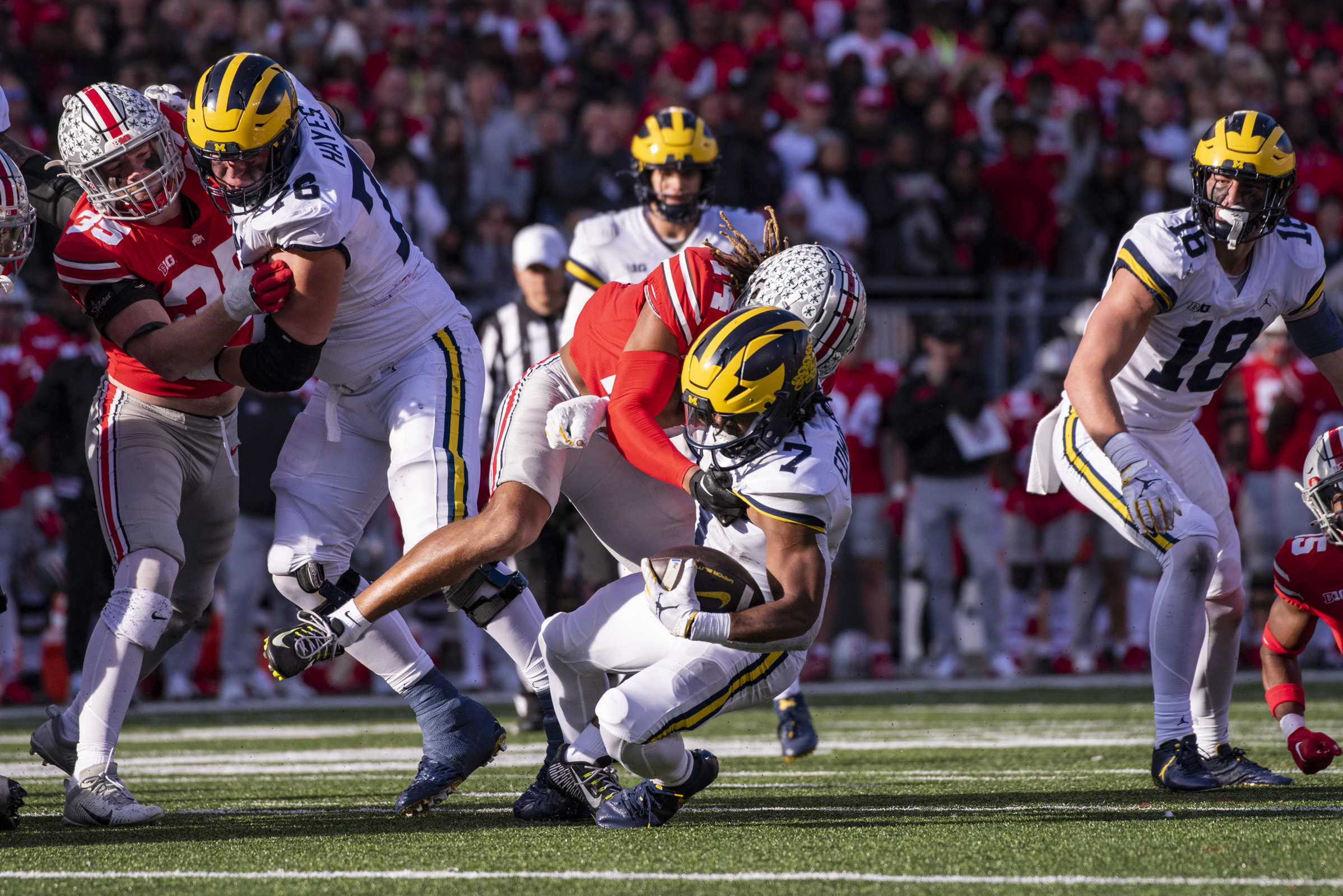
Michigan (in white) and Ohio State, members of the Big Ten power conference, playing in November 2022

The power conferences or the Power Four are the most prominent athletic conferences in college football in the United States. They are part of the Football Bowl Subdivision (FBS) of the National Collegiate Athletic Association's Division I, the highest level of collegiate football in the nation, and are considered the most elite conferences within that tier. Power conferences have provided most of the participants in the College Football Playoff (CFP) and its predecessors, and generally have larger revenue, budgets, and television viewership than other college athletic programs. The Atlantic Coast Conference (ACC), Big Ten Conference, Big 12 Conference, and Southeastern Conference (SEC) are currently recognized as power conferences.

For decades, the most prominent conferences sent their teams to postseason bowl games, but the season frequently ended with multiple teams claiming the national championship. After the 1990 and 1991 seasons ended with consecutive split championships, several of the most prominent conferences and bowl games formed the Bowl Coalition (1992–1994) and later the Bowl Alliance (1995–1997) to provide a definitive national champion. In 1998, the Power Six—the ACC, Big Ten, Big 12, Big East, SEC, and Pac-12—and four prominent bowl games—the Fiesta, Orange, Rose, and Sugar Bowls—formed the Bowl Championship Series (BCS), with conference champions awarded Automatic Qualifying (AQ) status to the bowl games and, provisionally, the National Championship Game.

The defection of three Big East members to the ACC after the 2005 conference realignment gradually diminished its stature, and it eventually split into two following a realignment in the early 2010s; at the same time, the BCS was reorganized into the College Football Playoff, and the remaining AQ conferences were collectively referred to as the Power Five. A further realignment in the early 2020s reduced the Pac-12 left to only two members after the 2023 season; the ACC, Big Ten, Big 12, and SEC now form the Power Four. As of the 2026 season, the FBS has 138 members, divided between the Power Four, six other conferences known as the Group of Six (G6), and two independent schools; of the two independent schools, the Notre Dame Fighting Irish – which is a non-football member of the ACC – is historically regarded as equivalent to a power conference team.

The term power conference is not defined by the NCAA, but the conferences are identified individually under NCAA rules as "autonomy conferences", which grants them some degree of independence from standard NCAA rules, such as financial compensation for student athletes. The power conferences also compete in other collegiate sports, but are not necessarily the most prominent in each sport; for example, in men's college basketball, the new Big East, which does not sponsor football, is also considered to be a power conference.

== List of conferences and teams ==
The ten FBS conferences as of the 2026–27 academic year are listed. For the Power Four, the members of each conference are also listed:

Power Four conferences and member universities
ACC (Note: The University of Notre Dame is a full voting member of the ACC, and although its football team does not participate in ACC football and competes as a football independent, it is obligated to play an average of five football games a year against ACC opponents. In 2020, during the COVID-19 pandemic, Notre Dame entered into a full ACC football schedule and was eligible for the conference's championship. Notre Dame fields 24 other varsity sports that compete in the ACC, as well as men's ice hockey which competes in the Big Ten Conference.)	Big Ten	Big 12	SEC
Boston College	Illinois	Arizona	Alabama
California	Indiana	Arizona State	Arkansas
Clemson	Iowa	Baylor	Auburn
Duke	Maryland	BYU	Florida
Florida State	Michigan	Cincinnati	Georgia
Georgia Tech	Michigan State	Colorado	Kentucky
Louisville	Minnesota	Houston	LSU
Miami (FL)	Nebraska	Iowa State	Ole Miss
North Carolina	Northwestern	Kansas	Mississippi State
NC State	Ohio State	Kansas State	Missouri
Pittsburgh	Oregon	Oklahoma State	Oklahoma
SMU	Penn State	TCU	South Carolina
Stanford	Purdue	Texas Tech	Tennessee
Syracuse	Rutgers	UCF	Texas
Virginia	UCLA	Utah	Texas A&M
Virginia Tech	USC	West Virginia	Vanderbilt
Wake Forest	Washington		
	Wisconsin		

Other FBS conferences
Group of Six conferences
American Conference
Conference USA
Mid-American Conference
Mountain West Conference
Pac-12 Conference
Sun Belt Conference

Independent teams
Notre Dame
UConn

=== Map of Power Four teams ===
Teams for each of the Power Four conferences during the 2024 season.
ACC
Big Ten
Big 12
SEC
Power Four independent

=== Teams by State ===
State	Teams	Count
Washington	Washington	1
Oregon	Oregon	1
California	California, Stanford, UCLA, USC	4
Utah	BYU, Utah	2
Arizona	Arizona, Arizona State	2
Colorado	Colorado	1
Nebraska	Nebraska	1
Kansas	Kansas, Kansas State	2
Oklahoma	Oklahoma, Oklahoma State	2
Texas	Baylor, Houston, SMU, TCU, Texas, Texas A&M, Texas Tech	7
Minnesota	Minnesota	1
Iowa	Iowa, Iowa State	2
Missouri	Missouri	1
Arkansas	Arkansas	1
Louisiana	LSU	1
Wisconsin	Wisconsin	1
Illinois	Illinois, Northwestern	2
Indiana	Indiana, Notre Dame, Purdue	3
Kentucky	Kentucky, Louisville	2
Tennessee	Tennessee, Vanderbilt	2
Mississippi	Mississippi State, Ole Miss	2
Alabama	Alabama, Auburn	2
Georgia	Georgia, Georgia Tech	2
Florida	Florida, Florida State, Miami (FL), UCF	4
Michigan	Michigan, Michigan State	2
Ohio	Cincinnati, Ohio State	2
New York	Syracuse	1
Massachusetts	Boston College	1
Pennsylvania	Penn State, Pittsburgh	2
New Jersey	Rutgers	1
West Virginia	West Virginia	1
Maryland	Maryland	1
Virginia	Virginia, Virginia Tech	2
North Carolina	Duke, NC State, UNC, Wake Forest	4
South Carolina	Clemson, South Carolina	2

== Power conferences in the College Football Playoff era ==
=== Position within college football and the FBS ===
The power conferences are all part of NCAA Division I, which contains most of the largest and most competitive collegiate athletic programs in the United States, and the Football Bowl Subdivision (FBS), which is the higher of the two levels of college football within NCAA Division I. It is unknown where the term "Power Conference" originated; it is not officially documented by the NCAA, though it has been used since at least 2006. The top conferences in college football are called the "Power Four conferences": the Big Ten Conference, the Big 12 Conference, the Atlantic Coast Conference (ACC), and the Southeastern Conference (SEC). Since 2014, the power conferences have held some autonomy from the rest of Division I in regard to issues such as stipends and recruiting rules. (Note: Section 5.3.2.1 of the NCAA Constitution grants the five conferences autonomy "to permit the use of resources to advance the legitimate educational or athletics-related needs of student-athletes and for legislative changes that will otherwise enhance student-athlete well-being". Eleven areas of autonomy are listed, including promotional activities unrelated to athletics participation, pre-enrollment expenses and support, and financial aid.)

Roughly half of the schools in the FBS play in one of the Power Four conferences. The remaining schools are either independent or play in one of the conferences known as the Group of Six conferences, which consists of the American Conference ("American"), Conference USA (CUSA), the Mid-American Conference (MAC), the Mountain West Conference (MW), the Pac-12 Conference ("Pac-12"), and the Sun Belt Conference (SBC). The term "Power Four conferences" is often shortened to "P4", while the remaining conferences are referred to as the "Group of Six conferences", or "Group of Five conferences" before the Pac-12's loss of autonomy. The FBS has two independents as of the 2026 season: the Notre Dame Fighting Irish and the UConn Huskies. Notre Dame is considered equal to the Power Four schools, being a full (with the exception of football) member of the ACC with an annual five-game football scheduling agreement with that conference; Notre Dame also has its own national television contract and its own arrangement for access to the CFP-affiliated bowl games should it meet stated competitive criteria. The other independents are generally considered to be on the same level as the G6 conferences.

Compared to the G6 conferences, power conference schools have significantly higher revenue, due to television deals with major networks and streaming services. In 2022, the power conferences generated a combined $3.3 billion in revenue. College football games often draw strong television ratings, and, along with the NFL, college football was one of the few television properties to grow in live ratings between 2013 and 2023. In 2022, college football games between power conference teams made up five of the ten most-watched non-NFL sporting events among U.S. viewers. With 22.56 million viewers, the 2022 national championship game ranked as the most watched college football game of the year, and as the 33rd most-watched sporting event in the United States; only NFL games ranked higher. Almost every Power Four school has a home stadium capacity of at least 40,000, and the power conferences all had an average attendance of at least 48,000 in 2025. This compares to an FBS average attendance of just under 42,000 and Group of Six average attendance that ranged between 13,000 and just over 25,000 for each conference, with legacy Pac-12 members Oregon State and Washington State respectively averaging about 30,000 and 26,500. This revenue advantage allows Power Four conferences to pay higher salaries to coaches and invest in expensive athletic facilities and amenities. Although schools cannot directly pay student athletes, since 2021 school boosters and other third parties can pay student athletes for their name, image, and likeness (NIL) rights. Much of this NIL money goes to Power Four conference athletes, although numerous athletes from other conferences have also received NIL compensation.

=== Scheduling and college football playoff ===
Teams in the Power Four conferences play an eight or nine-game conference schedule, and play an additional three or four non-conference games to fill out their 12-game regular season schedule. (Note: Hawaii and teams that play at Hawaii are allowed to schedule a thirteenth regular-season game.) Teams from the Power Four and the Group of Six often play non-conference games against each other during the season, and sometimes also play against teams from the FCS, the lower tier of division one football. However, many coaches of power conference schools have argued that power conference schools should only be allowed to schedule games against other power conference schools. All Power Four conferences that require their members to schedule at least one power conference opponent in nonconference play consider Notre Dame to be a power conference opponent for such purposes; the Big Ten and SEC also count Army as such an opponent. Though not required to do so, all Power Four conferences hold conference championship games following the conclusion of the regular season and prior to the College Football Playoff. The power conferences previously each had two divisions and matched the winner of each division in the conference championship game, but all of the Power Four conferences have scrapped divisions, and conference championship games take place between the two highest-ranking teams.

The College Football Playoff takes place after the conference championship games and contemporaneously with several other bowl games. Following several changes after the 2023 college football season, the playoff consists of 12 teams, with the top five conference champions receiving automatic bids to the playoffs. At least one Group of Five Conference will be awarded one of the automatic bids in each playoff. The College Football Playoff requires that a conference have at least eight teams in order to be eligible for an automatic qualifying bid, so the two-member Pac-12 (Note: The Pac-12 is set to expand to eight football-sponsoring members for the 2026 season with the addition of Boise State, Colorado State, Fresno State, San Diego State, Texas State, and Utah State.) is not eligible to receive an automatic bid. The four highest-ranked conference champions receive first-round byes, while the remaining eight teams play in the opening round of the playoffs at the home fields of the higher seeds. The "New Year's Six" bowls, which have held an important role in the college football postseason since before the establishment of the College Football Playoff, host the quarterfinals and semifinals on a rotating basis. The College Football Playoff National Championship, the final game of the College Football Playoff, is held at a separately determined neutral site.

== History ==
=== Origins of the power conferences ===
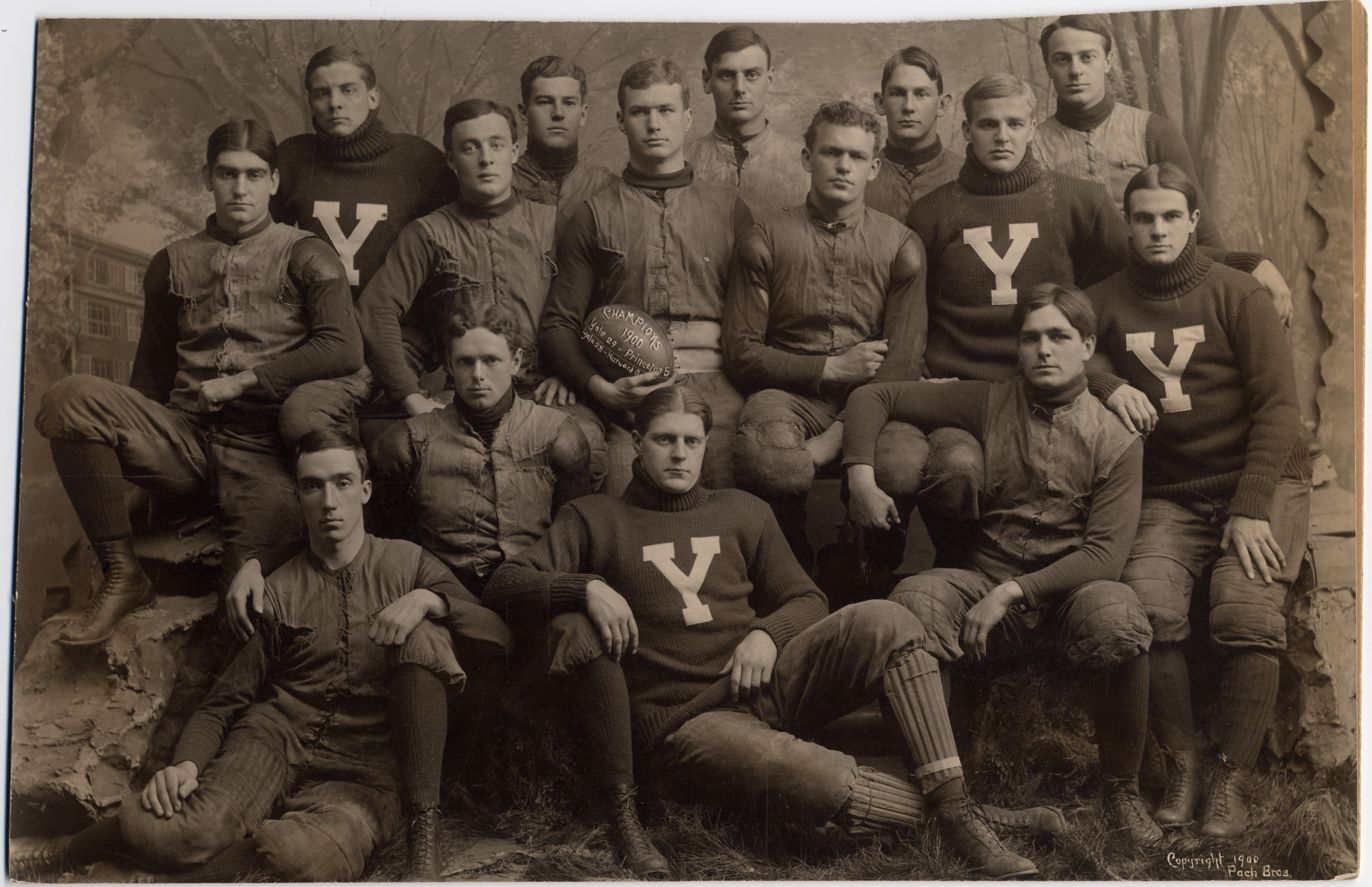
The 1900 Yale Bulldogs, deemed national champion of the 1900 college football season

College football originated in the Northeastern United States in the final third of the 19th century, with the 1869 Princeton vs. Rutgers football game often considered to be the first college football game. The schools that eventually formed the Ivy League dominated college football in the 19th century and for parts of the 20th century, claiming numerous national championships. Motivated in large part by fatalities and injuries sustained in college football, President Theodore Roosevelt worked with various collegiate athletic programs to establish the NCAA in 1906. The NCAA was preceded by the earliest athletic conferences, including the Big Ten, which was founded in 1896 as the Intercollegiate Conference of Faculty Representatives and was often referred to as the "Western Conference". The conference became known as the Big Ten after expanding to ten teams in 1917, though it did not legally adopt the "Big Ten" name until 1987. The Southern Intercollegiate Athletic Association (SIAA), founded in 1894, at its peak consisted of 28 schools across almost every Southern state, and was the predecessor to both the SEC and the ACC.

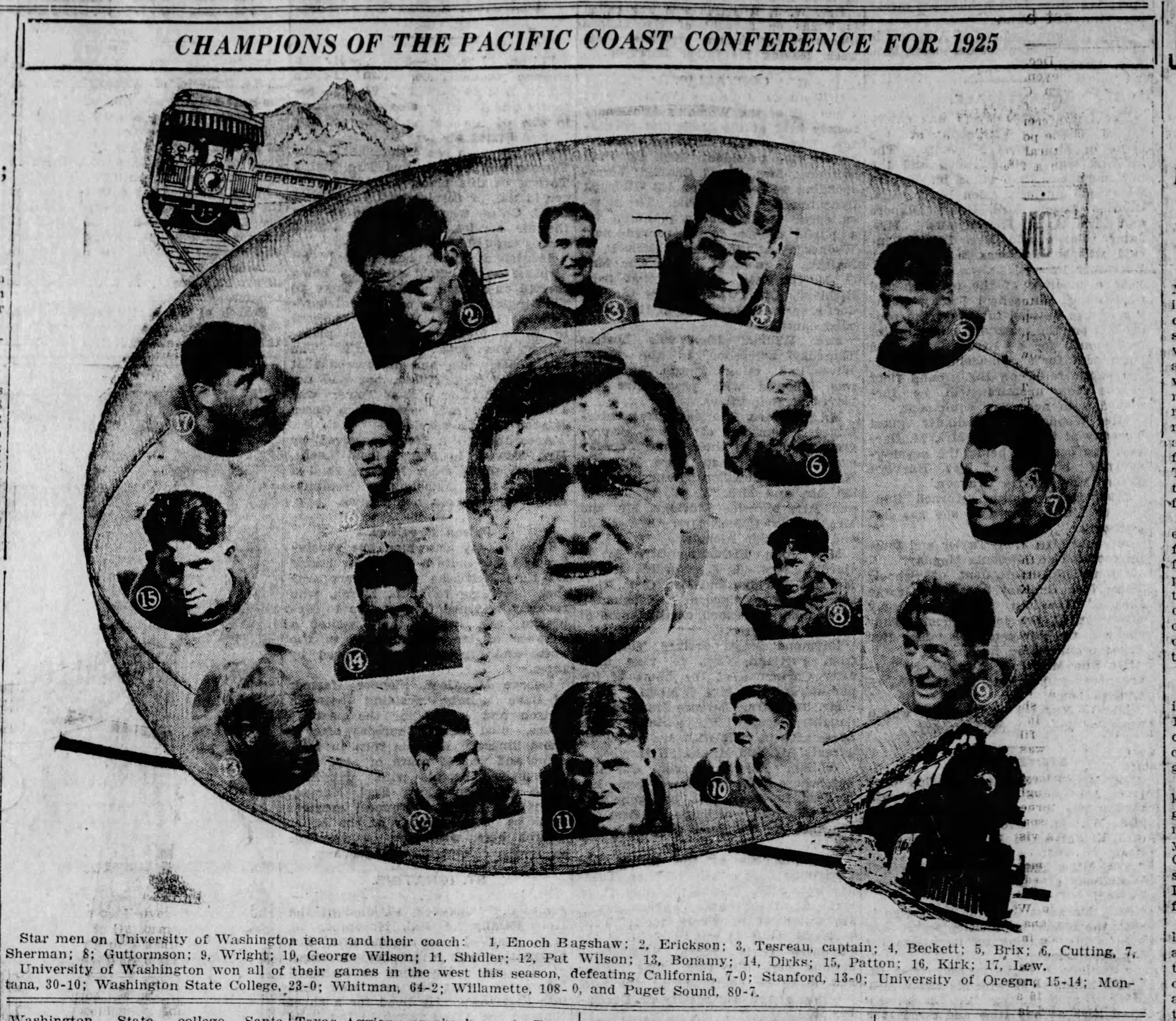
A newspaper clipping of the 1925 Washington Huskies, who competed in the Pacific Coast Conference

The Missouri Valley Intercollegiate Athletic Association (MVIAA) was formed in 1907, and in 1928 the MVIAA split into two conferences, with the larger schools from the MVIAA forming the Big Six Conference. The Big Six later expanded to eight teams in 1957, becoming known as the Big Eight Conference. The Southwest Conference (SWC) was formed in 1914 by several schools in Texas and neighboring states and, after some early defections, maintained stable membership into the 1990s. The Pacific Coast Conference (PCC) was founded in 1915, but disbanded in 1959 following a "pay-for-play" scandal. Some of the former members of the Pacific Coast Conference formed the Athletic Association of Western Universities (AAWU) that same year, and by 1968 the AAWU had renamed itself as the Pac-8 and contained most of the former members of the PCC. Several of the larger schools split off from the SIAA in 1921 to form the Southern Conference, and the SIAA ultimately dissolved in 1942. The Southern Conference in turn later experienced the departure of its most prominent teams, first with the secession of 13 schools located south or west of the Appalachians to form the SEC in 1932. Most of the remaining large schools departed the Southern Conference in 1953 to form the ACC, and after losing its top programs, the Southern Conference ultimately became part of the FCS. The Ivy League was officially founded in the 1950s, but the football programs of Ivy League schools declined in stature after World War II, and the conference ultimately dropped down to Division I-AA in 1982.

Until the 1990s, many top programs, particularly in the Northeast, played as football independents. Many of these independents were affiliated with the Big East Conference, the Atlantic 10 Conference (A-10), or the Metro Conference, each of which were founded in the 1970s as non-football conferences. In 1962, several members of the Skyline Conference and the Border Conference founded the Western Athletic Conference (WAC). Although generally not considered a power conference, four of the six founding WAC members ultimately joined one of the Power Four conferences, and the 1984 BYU Cougars football team won the national championship. NCAA divisions were created in 1956, initially for basketball and cross-country, with the largest schools placed in the University Division and other schools in the College Division. The NCAA requested all schools to classify themselves as members of the College or University divisions in 1968, and in 1973 the University Division was renamed Division I and given the power to establish some of its own rules related to matters such as recruitment and membership criteria. In 1978, Division I football programs were further sub-divided into Division I-A (later Division I FBS) and Division I-AA (later Division I FCS).

=== Rise of bowl games and precursors to the BCS ===
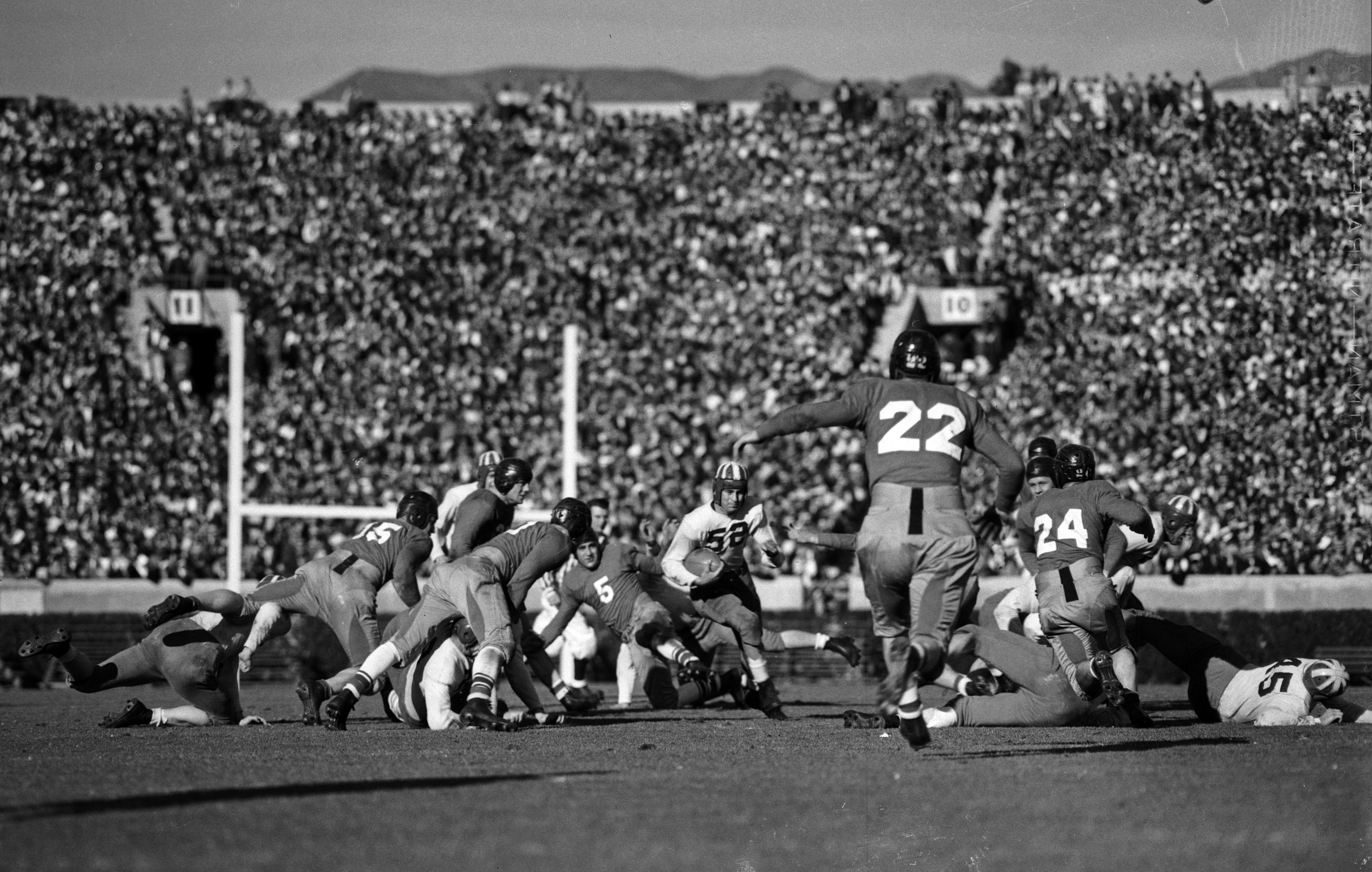
Action during the 1935 Rose Bowl

The Rose Bowl, a postseason game matching top teams from the West with top teams from the East, was first played in 1902 and became a yearly tradition in 1916. As college football grew beyond its regional affiliations in the 1930s, it garnered increased national attention. Four new bowl games were created: the Orange Bowl, Sugar Bowl, and Sun Bowl in 1935, and the Cotton Bowl in 1937. In lieu of an actual national championship, these bowl games provided a way to match up teams from distant regions of the country that did not otherwise play. In 1936, the Associated Press began its weekly poll of prominent sports writers, ranking all of the nation's college football teams. Since there was no national championship game, the final version of the AP poll was used to determine who was crowned the national champion of college football.

The first college football game was televised in 1938, and as universities began to widely televise their games after World War II, the NCAA took control of television broadcast rights in 1951 and restricted the number of games that a program could air on television. The 1984 Supreme Court case NCAA v. Board of Regents of the University of Oklahoma spurred a round of conference realignment by ending the NCAA's monopoly on television rights of college football games, instead granting the rights to individual schools and conferences. With the exception of Notre Dame, all of the major independent programs joined a conference in the early 1990s. Many of the independents in the Northeast and elsewhere on the Eastern Seaboard joined the Big East, which began playing football in 1991. Other independent schools joined the Big Ten, the ACC, or the SEC, and in 1992 the SEC became the first Division I conference to hold a conference championship game for football. The Southwest Conference dissolved in the wake of a series of scandals and concerns over an insufficiently large television market, and four teams from that conference joined with the Big 8 to create the Big 12 Conference in 1994. The remaining SWC schools joined the WAC or the newly-formed Conference USA, though most later joined one of the Power Four conferences; (Note: Of the former long-term members of the SWC, all but Rice University are currently in a Power Four conference.) other future power conference schools such as Louisville and BYU also played in the WAC or Conference USA during the 1990s.

Map of power conferences in 1993
The conferences of the Bowl Coalition (including independent Notre Dame), as well as the future founding conferences of the Bowl Championship Series (BCS), during the 1993 season:
Atlantic Coast Conference
Big East Conference (1979-2013)
Big Eight Conference
Big Ten Conference
Pacific-10
SEC
Southwest Conference
Notre Dame

By the middle of the 20th century, the Rose Bowl matched up the Big Ten champion against the champion of the PCC and its successors, the Sugar Bowl generally hosted the conference champion of the SEC, and the Cotton Bowl generally hosted the conference champion of the SWC. The Orange Bowl often hosted the champion of the Big Eight, though it later developed close ties with the ACC. The Fiesta Bowl was initially founded in 1971 to host the WAC champion, but later rose to prominence in the 1980s while frequently hosting games involving independents, including the 1987 Fiesta Bowl, which served as the de facto national championship game for that season. From 1968 to 1992, the number one and number two ranked teams in the AP poll met only eight times in a bowl game, frequently leading to situations in which multiple teams claimed the national championship. Seeking a more definitive way to determine the national champion, the SEC, Big 8, SWC (prior to its dissolution), ACC, Big East, and independent Notre Dame joined with several bowls to form the Bowl Coalition, which was later succeeded by the similar Bowl Alliance. The Big Ten and Pac-10 declined to join either group in favor of continuing to send their respective champion to the Rose Bowl, contributing to split national championships during some seasons in the 1990s.

=== Under the BCS system ===
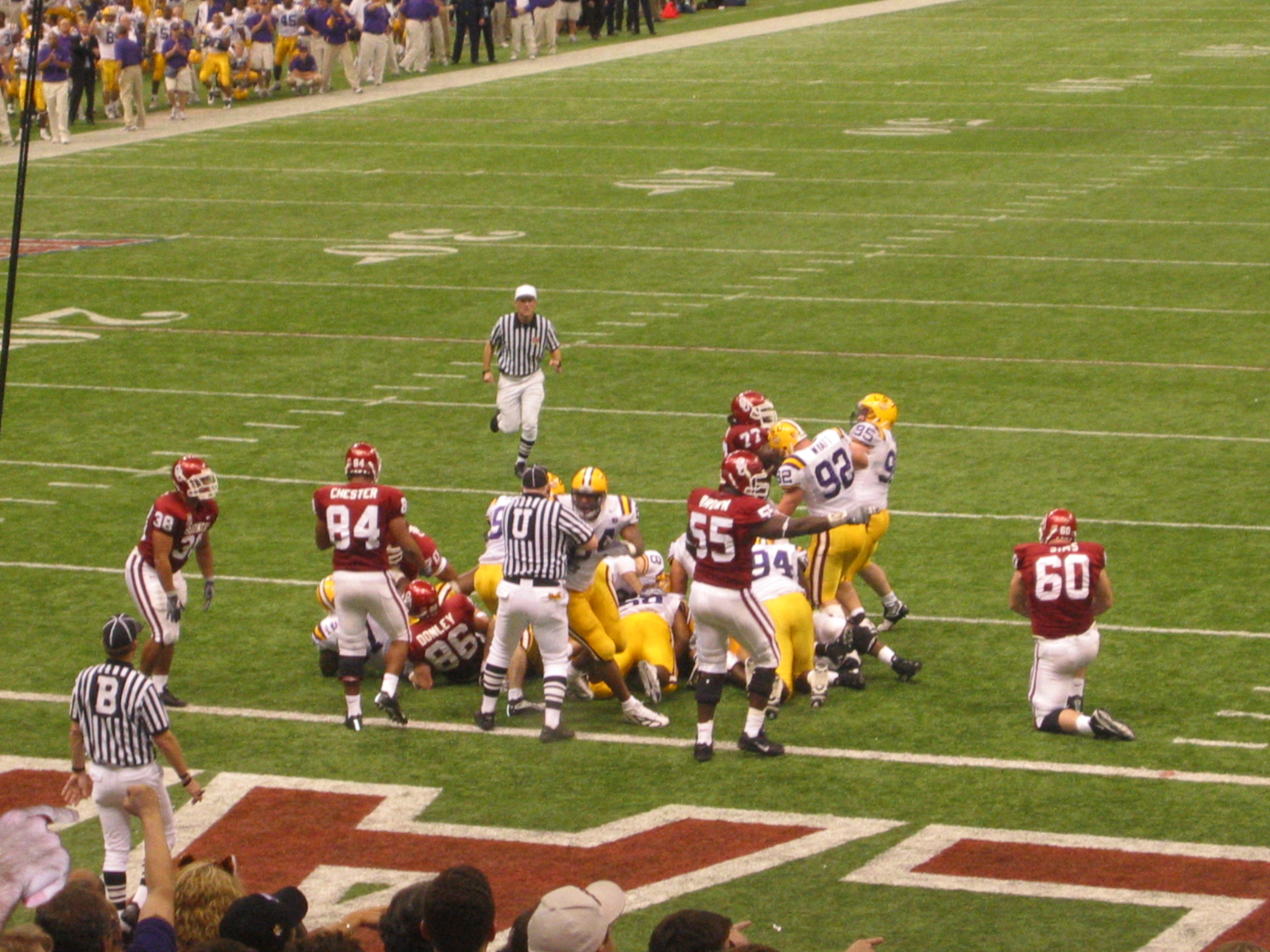
Action from the 2004 Sugar Bowl, the BCS championship game for the 2003 season

In 1998, the Bowl Championship Series (BCS) was created by the Big 10, Pac-12, and the former members of the Bowl Alliance. The Rose Bowl, the Sugar Bowl, the Orange Bowl, and the Fiesta Bowl all took part in the system, with a national championship game either rotating among the four bowl sites (prior to the 2006 season) or played as a separate game. The BCS succeeded in bringing an end to split national championships, except in the 2003 season, when LSU won the national championship game and was crowned national champion by the Coaches Poll, but USC was selected as the national champion by the AP poll. While the number of AQ conferences was technically variable, the BCS always had six AQ conferences for its entire history between 1998 and 2013. Following the departure of several Big East members to the ACC, the non-football schools of the Big East known as the "Catholic 7" chose to withdraw from the conference, ultimately creating a new conference that took on the Big East name. The rump Big East renamed itself as the American Athletic Conference (now known as the American Conference) and took the Big East's automatic bid for the 2013 season. The Mountain West Conference, formed in 1998 by several former WAC members, was perhaps the closest of the other conferences to getting AQ status, but its request for AQ status was denied in 2012.

In addition to creating a national championship game, the BCS also created a set format for other major bowls. After the two top teams in the BCS rankings were matched up in the BCS National Championship Game, the other three or (after the 2005 season) four bowls selected other top teams. The BCS ranking formula used a combination of polls and computer selection methods to determine team rankings, though conference championships also affected game selection. The term "BCS conference" was used by many fans to refer to one of the six conferences whose champions received an automatic berth in one of the five BCS bowl games, although the BCS itself used the term "automatic qualifying conference" (AQ conference). Each of the bowls had a historical link with one or more of the six BCS conferences with the exception of the former Big East, and the bowl games selected a team from each of these conferences if it was eligible for a BCS bowl and not playing in the national title game. Notre Dame remained an independent in football, but had guaranteed access to the BCS bowls when it met certain defined performance criteria. The conferences automatic qualifying conferences and their traditional bowl links were:

- Big East Conference (The American in 2013) (not tied to any specific BCS bowl)
- Atlantic Coast Conference (Orange Bowl)
- Big 12 Conference (Fiesta Bowl)
- Big Ten Conference (Rose Bowl)
- Pac-12 Conference (Rose Bowl)
- Southeastern Conference (Sugar Bowl)

Map of automatic qualifying conference schools in 2013
A map of every university in the automatic qualifying conferences in 2013.

The other conferences (listed below) were non-AQ conferences because they did not receive an annual automatic bid to a BCS bowl game. The highest ranked champion of any non-AQ conference received an AQ bid if they ranked in the top 12 of the final BCS poll or ranked in the top 16 and higher than a champion of an AQ conference. The conferences in this group were:

- Big West Conference (BWC) – stopped sponsoring football after the 2000 season.
- Conference USA (CUSA)
- Mid-American Conference (MAC)
- Mountain West Conference (MW)
- Sun Belt Conference (SBC) – began sponsoring football in 2001.
- Western Athletic Conference (WAC) – dropped football after the 2012 season. (Note: The WAC dropped football following a near-complete membership turnover that saw the league stripped of all but two of its football-sponsoring schools. The conference reinstated football in 2021, but as part of the second-tier Division I FCS; it has since merged its football league with that of the Atlantic Sun Conference, creating a football-only version of the United Athletic Conference (UAC). The United Athletic Conference name was adopted by the Western Athletic Conference beginning in July 2026.)

=== Under the four-team College Football Playoff system ===
Locations of the New Year's Six Bowl games, which collectively play a major role in the College Football Playoff

The BCS faced several controversies throughout its tenure, driven largely by teams and fans dissatisfied at being left out of the championship game. The presence of two SEC teams in the 2012 BCS National Championship Game brought the opposition to the BCS to a head, and helped spur the adoption of the College Football Playoff beginning with the 2014 season. Like the BCS, the four-team College Football Playoff took place after the conference championship games and contemporaneously with several other bowl games. It rotated among six bowl games, with two bowl games used each year as the national semi-finals, and four other bowls matching the remaining top teams in the country. These six bowl games were collectively labeled as the "New Year's Six" bowl games. The New Year's Six consisted of the four BCS bowls, the Cotton Bowl, and the Peach Bowl, the latter of which was established in 1968 but had been considered a minor bowl for much of its history.

Although the term "Power Five conferences" had been used by at least 2006, it gained prominence following the collapse of the Big East and the end of BCS automatic qualifying status for conferences; the Power Five conferences consisted of the ACC, the Big Ten, the Big 12, the Pac-12, and the SEC. Each conference champion from the Power Five and the highest-ranked Group of Five conference champion were guaranteed a spot in a New Year's Six Bowl. Because there were four spots in the playoffs and five power conferences, at least one Power Five champion was always left out of the playoff. In some seasons only two or three P5 champions were selected to the playoff, though the 2023 Florida State Seminoles were the lone undefeated P5 champion to be passed over for selection.

The new playoff system drew strong television ratings, helping to boost the profile of college football and specifically to the Power Five conferences, who constituted all but one of the CFP participants in the four-team era, and the remaining FBS programs. Responding in part to the possibility that the Power Five might split off to form its own organization, in 2014 the NCAA Division I Board of Directors granted the Power Five conferences autonomy over rules such as stipends and staff sizes. The CFP also led to changes in stature among the Power Five, and the Pac-12's failure to place a team in the CFP for seven years contributed to the exodus of most of its programs following the 2023 season. Bowl games declined in prestige as more focus went to the playoff, and even the New Year's Six bowls frequently saw top players opt out. Like the BCS, the new system endured a series of controversies related to teams being left out of the championship process, both among the Power Five and the Group of Five, leading many to call for a playoff. The 2021 Cincinnati Bearcats were the only Group of Five team (Note: The Cincinnati Bearcats and UCF Knights later joined the Big 12 in 2023, thereby becoming Power Five teams.) to ever play in the College Football Playoff prior to the playoff's expansion to twelve teams in 2024; the Bearcats were defeated in the semi-final 2021 Cotton Bowl Classic. Another Group of Five team, the 2017 UCF Knights, was left out of the CFP, but proclaimed themselves the national champion after going undefeated in the regular season and winning the 2018 Peach Bowl. (Note: UCF was also recognized as national champion by the Colley Matrix, but the AP poll and the Coaches Poll both selected Alabama as the national champion after it won the 2018 College Football Playoff National Championship.) In 2022, the College Football playoff board voted to expand the playoff to twelve teams, with the new system taking effect for the 2024 season.

As part of the early-2020s NCAA conference realignment, ten schools departed from the Pac-12 following the 2023 college football season, leaving Oregon State and Washington State as the last remaining members of the Pac-12. Although the Football Bowl Subdivision requires conferences to have at least eight members, the conference continued operating with just two members because conferences are allowed a two-year grace period after losing members. In early 2024, the NCAA Division I Board of Directors stripped the Pac-12 of its autonomous conference status. In light of the changes, various sources began referring to the ACC, Big Ten, Big 12, and SEC as the Power Four Conferences, with the Pac-12 relegated to "de facto Group of 5 status".

== Realignment since the 1990s ==
The FBS has undergone several waves of realignment since the 1990s, when the Bowl Coalition was established. The first realignment occurred in the 1990s, and resulted in the demise of the Southwest Conference, which was a member of the Bowl Coalition and at times considered equal to some of the power conferences; as well as many schools giving up independent status to join conferences. In the early 1990s, Arkansas left the Southwest Conference for the SEC; the original Big East Conference began sponsoring football, with eight former football independents joining either for all sports or football only; and other major independents such as Florida State (to the ACC), Penn State (to the Big Ten), and South Carolina (to the SEC) joined major conferences. In the 1996 NCAA conference realignment, the SWC dissolved, and four Texas teams from that conference joined with the Big 8 schools to form the Big 12 Conference.

During another phase of realignment in 2005, three schools (Boston College, Miami-FL and Virginia Tech) jumped from the Big East to the ACC, and Temple also left the conference (before eventually returning in 2013). The Big East responded by adding former basketball-only member Connecticut and three schools from CUSA.

College football underwent another major conference realignment from 2010 to 2014, as the Big Ten and Pac-10 sought to become large enough to stage championship games. Members of the original Big East left the conference to join the Big 12, Big Ten, and ACC. The Big 12 lost members to the SEC, the Pac-12, and the Big Ten, while the Big Ten also gained one former ACC member. The remaining members of the Big East split into two conferences: the American Athletic Conference (now the American Conference; short form "American") and a new Big East Conference that does not sponsor football (only three of the original 10 members of the Big East sponsor football, all at the second-tier Division I FCS level). The American, the football successor to the Big East, is no longer considered a power conference. Despite the major conference realignment from 2010 to 2014, relatively few schools dropped out of or joined the ranks of the power conferences. Two of the three non-AQ schools that had appeared in multiple BCS bowls left the Mountain West Conference and joined a power conference, as Utah joined the Pac-12 and TCU joined the Big 12. Former Big East members Temple and South Florida became part of The American; another former Big East member, UConn, left American Conference football after the 2019 season to become an FBS independent while otherwise joining the Big East. Of these, only Temple was a founding member of the Big East in football.

The most recent major realignment is ongoing, though there is no future planned power conference realignment after the 2024 season. During a period of less than two months in 2021, the Big 12 both gained and lost members. First, on July 30, the conference lost two of its mainstays when Oklahoma and Texas announced that they would leave for the SEC no later than 2025; the two schools later reached a buyout agreement allowing them to join the SEC in 2024. The Big 12 reloaded by announcing four new members on September 10, initially announcing that American members Cincinnati, Houston, and UCF plus FBS independent BYU would join no later than 2024. BYU's initial announcement stated that it would join in 2023, and the other three schools' 2023 entry date was confirmed after they reached a buyout agreement with The American. On June 30, 2022, Pac-12 mainstays UCLA and USC announced they would move to the Big Ten in 2024. The Pac-12 lost another member a little more than a year later when Colorado returned to the Big 12 in 2024 after an absence of 13 years.

Five more schools announced their departure from the Pac-12 on August 4, 2023; Oregon and Washington joined the Big Ten and Arizona, Arizona State, and Utah joined the Big 12. Less than a month after this exodus, California and Stanford announced their departure from the Pac-12 to join the ACC in 2024, with American Conference member SMU also joining the ACC. This realignment led to Pac-12 being considered a de facto member of the Group of Five, and fueled discussion that the Big Ten and the SEC might ultimately emerge as the "Power Two" conferences. The realignment also generated much commentary regarding the lack of geographical proximity within conferences. In a 2022 article, FiveThirtyEight described the Big Ten as the first "major college athletics league" to be bicoastal (the Big Ten would later be joined by the ACC in this distinction after the latter conference added Stanford and California), adding that the average distance between FBS conference members was set to increase from 336 miles to 412 miles.

=== List of schools that changed power conferences since 1998 ===
Indicates a football-only move.
Indicates a non-football move.

This list includes all institutions that have either left or announced their departure from the ACC, Big East, (Note: Louisville and Rutgers are also listed in the table because they departed from the American Athletic Conference after the 2013 season, when the AAC inherited the Big East's automatic qualifying status.) Big 12, Pac-12, Big 10, or SEC since the establishment of the Bowl Championship Series in 1998.

Institution	Year moved	From conference	To conference
Virginia Tech	2000	A-10/Big East (Note: Virginia Tech had joined the Big East as a football-only member in 1991.)	Big East
Miami	2004	Big East	ACC
Virginia Tech	2004	Big East	ACC
Boston College	2005	Big East	ACC
Temple	2005	A-10/Big East (Note: Temple was a football-only member of the Big East. It was primarily affiliated with the Atlantic 10 Conference.)	A-10/Independent
Colorado	2011	Big 12	Pac-12
Nebraska	2011	Big 12	Big Ten
Missouri	2012	Big 12	SEC
Texas A&M	2012	Big 12	SEC
West Virginia	2012	Big East	Big 12
Notre Dame	2013	Big East/Independent (Note: Notre Dame was a non-football member of the Big East, and Notre Dame football maintained independence after the school joined the ACC.)	ACC/Independent
Pittsburgh	2013	Big East	ACC
Syracuse	2013	Big East	ACC
Louisville	2014	AAC	ACC
Maryland	2014	ACC	Big Ten
Rutgers	2014	AAC	Big Ten
Texas	2024	Big 12	SEC
Oklahoma	2024	Big 12	SEC
USC	2024	Pac-12	Big Ten
UCLA	2024	Pac-12	Big Ten
Oregon	2024	Pac-12	Big Ten
Washington	2024	Pac-12	Big Ten
Colorado	2024	Pac-12	Big 12
Utah	2024	Pac-12	Big 12
Arizona	2024	Pac-12	Big 12
Arizona State	2024	Pac-12	Big 12
California	2024	Pac-12	ACC
Stanford	2024	Pac-12	ACC

=== List of schools that joined a power conference since 1998 ===
Indicates a football-only move.
Indicates a non-football move.

This list includes all institutions that joined or have announced that they will join the ACC, Big 12, Pac-12, Big 10, or SEC after the establishment of the Bowl Championship Series in 1998, and that had previously been independent or had affiliated with a non-power conference. It also includes all institutions that joined the original Big East between 1998 and 2013, and teams that joined the AAC for the 2013 season, since that conference inherited the Big East's BCS automatic qualifying status for that season.

Institution	Year moved	From conference	To conference
Connecticut	2004	Big East/Independent (Note: Connecticut had previously been a Big East member for most sports, but played as a football independent prior to 2004.)	Big East
Cincinnati	2005	Conference USA	Big East
Louisville	2005	Conference USA	Big East
South Florida	2005	Conference USA	Big East
Utah	2011	MW	Pac-12
TCU	2012	MW	Big 12
Temple	2012	A-10/MAC (Note: Temple had previously been an Atlantic 10 member for most sports, but played football in the Mid-American Conference prior to 2012.)	Big East
Houston	2013	Conference USA	American
Memphis	2013	Conference USA	American
SMU	2013	Conference USA	American
UCF	2013	Conference USA	American
BYU	2023	WCC/Independent (Note: BYU was a football independent prior to joining the Big 12.)	Big 12
Cincinnati	2023	American	Big 12
Houston	2023	American	Big 12
UCF	2023	American	Big 12
SMU	2024	American	ACC

== Bowl game results ==
=== New Year's Six and BCS Bowl Game appearances by conference ===
The following table lists the number of times that a member of each conference appeared was selected to appear in a BCS bowl game (from 1998 to 2013), a New Year's Six bowl game (from 2014 to 2023), or the College Football Playoff (since 2014). From the 1998 to 2005 seasons eight teams were selected, from 2006 to 2013 ten teams were selected, and since 2014 twelve teams have been selected to appear in these games.

A * indicates a team from that conference won the national championship as determined by the BCS or the College Football Playoff, (Note: Since 1998, there has been one instance where either the BCS or College Football Playoff chose a different national championship from the AP poll or the Coaches Poll. In the 2003 season, the LSU Tigers won that season's BCS National Championship game and were chosen as the champion by the Coaches Poll, but the AP poll selected USC as the national champion after their victory in the 2004 Rose Bowl.) while a ^ indicates a team from that conference was the runner-up in the national championship game. Statistics reflect conference membership at the time of the game. Note that the American filled the Big East's automatic bid in 2013.

College Football Playoff and New Year's Six results, 1998–2023
	Power conferences						Other conferences and independents			
Season	ACC	Big 12	Big Ten	Pac-12 (Note: Pac-12 appearance are listed in the "Others" category after the 2023 bowl season.)	SEC	Big East	ND	MW	American	Others
2025	1	1	3	n/a	5	n/a	-	-	1	1
2024	2	1	4	n/a	3	n/a	1	1	-	-
2023	1	1	3*	2^	4	n/a	-	-	-	1
2022	1	2^	3	2	3*	n/a	-	-	1	-
2021	1	2	3	1	3*^	n/a	1	-	1	-
2020	2	2	1^	1	4*	n/a	1	-	1	-
2019	2^	2	3	1	3*	n/a	-	-	1	-
2018	1*	2	2	1	4^	n/a	1	-	1	-
2017	2	1	3	2	3*^	n/a	-	-	1	-
2016	2*	1	4	2	2^	n/a	-	-	-	1
2015	2^	2	3	1	2*	n/a	1	-	1	-
2014	2	2	2*	2^	3	n/a	-	1	-	-
2013	2*	2	2	1	2^	n/a	-	-	1	-
2012	1	1	1	2	2*	1	1^	-	n/a	1
2011	2	1	2	2	2*^	1	-	-	n/a	-
2010	1	1	2	2^	2*	1	-	1	n/a	-
2009	1	1^	2	1	2*	1	-	1	n/a	1
2008	1	2^	2	1	2*	1	-	1	n/a	-
2007	1	2	2^	1	2*	1	-	-	n/a	1
2006	1	1	2^	1	2*	1	1	-	n/a	1
2005	1	1*	1	2^	1	1	1	-	n/a	-
2004	1	2^	1	1*	1	1	-	1	n/a	-
2003	1	2^	2	1	1*	1	-	-	n/a	-
2002	1	1	2*	2	1	1^	-	-	n/a	-
2001	1	2^	1	1	2	1*	-	-	n/a	-
2000	1^	1*	1	2	1	1	1	-	n/a	-
1999	1*	1	2	1	2	1^	-	-	n/a	-
1998	1^	1	2	1	2*	1	-	n/a	n/a	-
Total	37	49	61	37	66	15	9	6	9	7
Champs	4	2	3	1	15	1	0	0	0	0

=== BCS games involving non-automatic qualifying conferences ===
Ten "non-AQ" teams appeared in the nine following BCS games, with an overall record of 5-3:

- 2005 Fiesta Bowl: **Utah** (MW) 35, Pittsburgh 7
- 2007 Fiesta Bowl: **Boise State** (WAC) 43, Oklahoma 42 (OT)
- 2008 Sugar Bowl: Georgia 41, **Hawaiʻi** (WAC) 10
- 2009 Sugar Bowl: **Utah** (MW) 31, Alabama 17
- 2010 Fiesta Bowl: **Boise State** (WAC) 17, **TCU** (MW) 10
- 2011 Rose Bowl: **TCU** (MW) 21, Wisconsin 19
- 2013 Orange Bowl: Florida State 31, **Northern Illinois** (MAC) 10

Of these appearances, all were via automatic qualifying bids, except Boise State's participation in the highly controversial 2010 Fiesta Bowl in which the Broncos were selected via at-large bid and played fellow BCS Buster TCU.

=== Power Conference vs Group Conference New Year's Six and College Football Playoff games ===
College Football Playoff semifinal in bold. Group conference team in italics. Asterisks denotes years in which group conference teams won the game.

Season	Bowl	Winner		Loser	
*2014	2014 Fiesta Bowl	No. 20 Boise State (MW)	38	No. 10 Arizona (Pac-12)	30
*2015	2015 Peach Bowl	No. 18 Houston (American)	38	No. 9 Florida State (ACC)	24
2016	2017 Cotton Bowl	No. 8 Wisconsin (Big Ten)	24	No. 15 Western Michigan (MAC)	16
*2017	2018 Peach Bowl	No. 12 UCF (American)	34	No. 7 Auburn (SEC)	27
2018	2019 Fiesta Bowl	No. 11 LSU (SEC)	40	No. 8 UCF (American)	32
2019	2019 Cotton Bowl	No. 10 Penn State (Big Ten)	53	No. 17 Memphis (American)	39
2020	2021 Peach Bowl	No. 9 Georgia (SEC)	24	No. 8 Cincinnati (American)	21
2021	**2022 Cotton Bowl**	No. 1 Alabama (SEC)	27	No. 4 Cincinnati (American)	6
*2022	2023 Cotton Bowl	No. 16 Tulane (American)	46	No. 10 USC (Pac-12)	45
2023	2024 Fiesta Bowl (January)	No. 8 Oregon (Pac-12)	45	No. 23 Liberty (CUSA)	6
2024	2024 Fiesta Bowl (December)	No. 4 Penn State (Big Ten)	31	No. 9 Boise State (MW)	14
2025	CFP first round	No. 6 Ole Miss (SEC)	41	No. 20 Tulane (American)	10
2025	CFP first round	No. 5 Oregon (Big Ten)	51	No. 24 James Madison (Sun Belt)	34

== Table of revenues, television sports rights, and average attendance ==
Total revenue in Fiscal Year 2023
Conference	Total Revenue	Distribution Per School
Big Ten Conference	$879.9 million	$60.5 million (58.8 to 2014 additions)
Southeastern Conference	$852.6 million	$51 million
Atlantic Coast Conference	$707.0 million	$43.3-46.9 million
Pac-12 Conference	$603.9 million	$33.6 million
Big 12 Conference	$510.7 million	$43.8-48.2 million

U.S. television sports rights for collegiate sports
Conference	National TV contract	TV Revenue (Per Year)	Ref
March Madness (college basketball)	CBS, TNT	$8.8bn ($1.1bn)	
College Football Playoff	ESPN, TNT	$5.6bn ($470m)	
Big Ten Conference (Big Ten)	Fox, NBC, CBS	$2.6bn ($440m)	
Big 12 Conference (Big 12)	Fox, ESPN	$2.6bn ($200m)	
Southeastern Conference (SEC)	ESPN	$2.25bn ($55m) (Note: This amount is only for the SEC's CBS deal, which is minimal compared to their ESPN deal. The ESPN payout (encompassing the SEC network) is determined on a yearly basis based on revenue. When combined, the SEC payouts are comparable to other conferences on this list.)	
Atlantic Coast Conference (ACC)	ESPN	$1.86bn ($155m)	

Average football attendance by conference in 2025
Conference	Attendance
Atlantic Coast Conference	48,491
Big Ten Conference	64,477
Big 12 Conference	49,988
Southeastern Conference	79,717
FBS average	41,727

== Outside of football ==
=== In sports outside of football ===
Each power conference sponsors at least 22 sports, with the Big Ten sponsoring the most at 28. Among all NCAA conferences, only two match or surpass the Big Ten's sports sponsorship level. The Ivy League sponsors 32 sports. In the 2025–26 school year, the Division II Conference Carolinas sponsors 26 sports on its own, and partners with other Division II conferences to offer conference-level championships in four more sports. Power Four schools dominate the list of NCAA schools with the most NCAA Division I championships; of the top fifteen schools, only the University of Denver, which last played football in 1960, does not play in a Power Four conference. Power Four schools also generally dominate the standings in the Division I NACDA Directors' Cup and the Capital One Cup, two awards honoring schools with the greatest collegiate athletic success across all sports. For example, the top ten of the 2022–23 Division I NACDA Directors' Cup standings consisted entirely of power conference programs. In 2025–26, the highest-ranked non-power program in the D-I Directors' Cup standings was FCS Princeton in 20th place; the top Group of 6 program was New Mexico in 58th, being outranked by three Ivy League programs; and the top non-football program was Denver in 66th.

The Power Four conferences are not necessarily the most prominent conferences in all sports in which they compete. For example, in men's college basketball, the Big East Conference is also generally considered to be a power conference. In basketball and some other sports, the Division I programs that are not part of the power conferences are often referred to as "mid-major" programs, although the appropriateness of the term has been criticized since some mid-major programs have resources equal to that of some power conference programs. Most notably, Gonzaga, which had been a member of the mid-major West Coast Conference for over 45 years before joining the reimagined Pac-12 in 2026, is generally considered a power program in men's basketball. In baseball and soccer, both non-revenue sports, the Sun Belt Conference (SBC) is considered a power conference. Immediately before joining the SBC in 2016, Coastal Carolina won that year's College World Series (now officially known as the Men's College World Series, or MCWS), and was runner-up in the 2025 MCWS as an SBC member. In addition, the conference sees multiple teams in the NCAA baseball tournament, and sometimes even advance to the MCWS. In 2026, the SBC had one more bid to the NCAA baseball tournament than the Big Ten Conference, and Troy advanced to its first MCWS. In soccer, the conference has Big 12 Conference members West Virginia and UCF, plus Southeastern Conference members Kentucky and South Carolina, as affiliates. This is due to neither power conference sponsoring men’s soccer. Matchups between the two SEC schools in men’s soccer are known as the SEC Derby. In addition, the Sun Belt also has full-time member Marshall, which won a national championship in its final years as a member of Conference USA and has played for another national championship since joining the SBC.

In 2024, the National Invitation Tournament, an annual men's college basketball tournament, was restructured such that the then-Power Five conferences, along with their former BCS counterpart the Big East, received two automatic bids with accompanying home court advantage, with the two bids selected from teams in those conferences that were not selected for the main men's basketball tournament. The move drew criticism from mid-major universities and conferences, as the previous NIT structure had awarded automatic bids to all Division I conferences whose teams with the strongest regular season record had not qualified for the NCAA Tournament. The NCAA admitted the maneuver was done in what eventually proved to be an unsuccessful attempt to preempt a proposed alternative tournament to the NIT. By contrast, the NCAA did not use this method of setting the field for the Women's Basketball Invitation Tournament, which it launched in the 2023–24 season as a direct parallel to the NIT. It instead followed the 2006–23 NIT practice of inviting all regular-season conference champions that failed to make the NCAA tournament, if otherwise eligible for postseason play. (Note: The 2023–24 regular-season and tournament champion of the Ohio Valley Conference, Southern Indiana, was not eligible for either the NCAA tournament or WBIT due to being in transition from NCAA Division II.)

=== Institutional profiles and academics ===
The overall institutional profiles and academic prestige of colleges and universities have a major influence on collegiate athletics conference membership, and athletic conference membership can impact a university's fundraising, academics, and overall reputation. Membership in the Association of American Universities (AAU), a 71-member organization of research universities in the United States and Canada, has frequently been discussed as a factor in conference realignment, particularly for the Big Ten. About half of the Power Four schools are in the AAU, with most of those schools in the ACC or Big Ten, although several are members of the Big 12 or the SEC. The Carnegie Classification of Institutions of Higher Education, a classification system of universities based on research activity, lists nearly all Power Four schools as "R1: Doctoral Universities – Very high research spending and doctorate production"; the exceptions are TCU and Wake Forest, each of which is listed as "R2: Doctoral Universities – High research spending and doctorate production". Of the 30 U.S. universities with the greatest research expenditures in 2022, nearly two-thirds were members of one of the power conferences. Some of the Power Four conferences share academic resources among conference members through related academic consortiums such as the Big Ten Academic Alliance and the Atlantic Coast Conference Academic Consortium.

Out of all Power Four schools, only five are religiously affiliated: Baylor, Boston College, BYU, Notre Dame, and TCU. Eight Power Four schools that are now officially nonsectarian were founded as faith-based institutions—ACC members Duke, SMU, Syracuse, and Wake Forest, Big Ten members Northwestern and USC, and SEC members Auburn (the only currently public institution among this group) and Vanderbilt. Most became officially nonsectarian in the 20th century. The main exceptions are Auburn, which was taken over by the state of Alabama in 1872 due to financial issues; Northwestern, which committed itself to a nonsectarian admissions policy at its 1851 founding; and SMU, which has been in a legal battle to formally separate itself from the United Methodist Church since 2019, with the school having won an intermediate appeal in the Texas courts in 2021. Another Power Four school, Kentucky, was founded as a publicly chartered department within the faith-based Kentucky University (now Transylvania University) before becoming an independent public institution in 1878.

== See also ==
- College Football Association
- Mid-major
- Superconference
