= Bowl Championship Series controversies =

The Bowl Championship Series (BCS) was a selection system used between 1998 and 2013 that replaced the previously similarly more controversial Bowl Coalition and Bowl Alliance that was used between 1992 and 1997 and was replaced by the College Football Playoff in 2014. The selection system was designed, through polls and computer statistics, to determine a No. 1 and No. 2 ranked team in the NCAA Division I Football Bowl Subdivision (FBS). After the final polls, the two top teams were chosen to play in the BCS National Championship Game which determined the BCS national champion team, but not the champion team for independent voting systems (most notably the AP Poll). This format was intended to be "bowl-centered" rather than a traditional playoff system, since numerous FBS Conferences had expressed their unwillingness to participate in a play-off system. However, due to the unique and often esoteric nature of the BCS format, there had been controversy as to which two teams should play for the national championship and which teams should play in the four other BCS bowl games (Fiesta Bowl, Orange Bowl, Rose Bowl, and Sugar Bowl). In this selection process, the BCS was often criticized for conference favoritism, its inequality of access for teams in non-Automatic Qualifying (non-AQ) Conferences (most likely due to those teams having a lower perceived strength of schedule), and perceived monopolistic, "profit-centered" motives. In terms of this last concern, Congress explored the possibility on more than one occasion of holding hearings to determine the legality of the BCS under the terms of the Sherman Anti-Trust Act, and the United States Justice Department also periodically announced interest in investigating the BCS for similar reasons.

== Overview ==
A survey conducted in 2009 at the Quinnipiac University found that 63% of individuals interested in college football preferred a playoff system to the BCS, while only 26 percent supported the BCS as status quo. Arguments from critics typically centered on the validity of BCS national championship pairings and its designated National Champions. Many critics focused strictly on the BCS methodology itself, which employed subjective voting assessments, while others noted the ability for undefeated teams to finish seasons without an opportunity to play the national championship game. For example, in the last six seasons of Division I FBS football, there have been more undefeated non-BCS champions than undefeated BCS champions. Other criticisms involved discrepancies in the allocation of monetary resources from BCS games, as well as the determination of non-championship BCS game participants, which need not comply with the BCS rankings themselves. Critics note that other sports and divisions of college football complete seasons without disputed national champions which critics attribute to the use of the playoff format.

Critics argued that increasing the number of teams would increase the validity of team comparisons in conferences, which do not compete with one another during the regular season; teams typically only play three or four non-conference games, as the result of pre-determined schedules. BCS proponents viewed the possibility of expanded competitive post-season opportunities as negative. The primary delivery of this objection was a slippery slope argument rhetorically known as bracket creep. Implementation of a playoff system, proponents objected, would lead to other, more serious consequences, such as the diminished value of the regular season, diminished value of the bowl tradition, or damage to the collegiate academic calendar year. Critics, including Republican congressman Joe Barton, were quick to respond to these red herrings, noting that teams from non-AQ conferences are already excluded from the national championship and their inclusion would only improve the meaningfulness of the regular season.

A further criticism of the system was the institutionalized bias towards the six AQ conferences and Notre Dame, an independent team in football, at the deliberate expense of the five Division I-A/FBS BCS non-AQ conferences. During the BCS era (1998–2013), 11 non-AQ conference Division I-A/FBS teams finished the regular season undefeated (Tulane in 1998; Marshall in 1999; Utah in 2004 and 2008; Boise State in 2004, 2006, 2008 and 2009; Hawaiʻi in 2007; and TCU in 2009 and 2010) without being given an opportunity to play in the national championship game. (Due to Mid-American Conference bowl tie-ins, the 1999 Marshall team was in danger of not going to any bowl game if it had lost the conference title game, despite its No. 11 final ranking.) Another problem was presented when more than one non-AQ conference team had an undefeated schedule in the same season. In 2008, Utah and Boise State both went undefeated. However, the BCS rules only provided for one automatic at-large BCS berth from teams in the non-AQ conferences. Therefore, a two-loss Ohio State team was chosen over Boise State for the Fiesta Bowl, and Boise State ended up outside of the BCS games. This problem arose again in 2009, with Boise State and TCU undefeated. The final BCS rankings saw TCU at No. 4 and Boise State at No. 6, which meant that only TCU was guaranteed a slot in the BCS bowls. However, the Broncos were not left out of the BCS bowl party this time, as they were chosen to face TCU in the Fiesta Bowl. Nonetheless, both Boise State and TCU finished the regular season unbeaten – in the case of Boise State, for the second year in a row, the fourth year out of six, and in 2006 finished as the only undefeated team in the nation – and never had a chance to play for a BCS national title.

Since, however, teams from non-AQ conferences play what are considered generally easier schedules than teams from AQ conferences, it is unclear whether this "bias" is merely a penalty based on schedule strength that can also apply to AQ conference teams (see, e.g., the 2007 Kansas team, below). A rejoinder would be that teams from non-AQ conferences only have so much control over their schedules, creating the possibility that such a team might in fact be one of the two best teams in the country, and might also have made a good-faith effort to play a challenging schedule, but might still be excluded from the national championship game. This could happen due to BCS teams turning them down in fear of an upset, or scheduling a traditionally strong school who turned out to be having a weak year. The 2009 TCU team is a counterexample, however. They defeated both Virginia and Clemson on the road, and won the rest of their games by an average of 31 points. They received a BCS bid to play against Boise State in the Fiesta Bowl. Critics, though, argue that TCU may have been more deserving to play Alabama in the BCS Championship Game than Texas. With wins over Clemson, BYU, and Utah, some journalists, including Football Writers Association of America Past-President Dennis Dodd, have cited the 2009 TCU team as an example of a non-AQ team, excluded from consideration for the national championship in spite of their performance against strong competition.

Teams from non-AQ conferences have been successful in BCS bowl games, but this has not affected the position of proponents that non-AQ conference teams are not on an equal level with teams from automatic qualifying conferences. Such "BCS Busters" went 5–3 in BCS bowl games, and 4–2 in BCS bowls against teams from AQ conferences: Utah won both its BCS bowl appearances in 2004 and 2008, Boise State won both of its appearances in 2006 and 2009, while TCU won a BCS bowl in 2010 after losing one in 2009 (to Boise State). Northern Illinois lost the Orange Bowl to a tough Florida State team 31–10. In the previous year the Clemson Tigers lost by 37 points to the West Virginia Mountaineers, with lower attendance and television ratings. The only team that could reasonably be described as "playing a weak schedule and then being exposed by a BCS team" is the 2007 Hawaii team, which was defeated by Georgia in the 2008 Sugar Bowl.

Another concern with the BCS was that a team could fail to win its conference championship, but still play in the BCS championship game. This happened in the 2001, 2003, and 2011 seasons. In 2001 Nebraska played Miami (Florida) in the BCS championship game, despite a blowout loss to Colorado in the Cornhuskers' final regular-season game which kept them out of the Big 12 Conference Championship game. In 2003 Oklahoma played LSU despite losing to Kansas State 35–7 in the Big 12 Conference title game. In 2011, Alabama was selected to play LSU in a rematch between the two programs despite losing the earlier matchup and not winning their division, let alone their conference. This entails that a team that could not even win their conference title is awarded the title of best team in the nation, despite the obvious presence of a better squad within their own conference, as was the case with Alabama in 2011. A rejoinder is that these situations actually reflect a virtue of the BCS system, which rewards teams for their performance throughout the entire season, thereby reinforcing the notion that, in college football, every game (rather than just conference championship games, or games late in the season) matters.

A similar criticism was that a team with similar or better arguments to another team can be left out of the BCS despite beating the other team. This happened between Miami (Florida) and Florida State University in 2000, where Miami beat Florida State yet Florida State went to the National Championship Game. The University of Washington also beat Miami and finished with an 11–1 record, further adding to the controversy. In 2008, the situation was repeated when one-loss Oklahoma was selected for the BCS Championship over one-loss Texas, which beat the Sooners during the regular season. (Note: This stemmed from an earlier controversy regarding the championship of the Big 12 South Division. Because Oklahoma, Texas, and Texas Tech had all finished the season 11–1, with Texas beating Oklahoma, Oklahoma beating Texas Tech, and Texas Tech beating Texas, the division champion was decided by which team was ranked the highest in the final BCS standings prior to the Championship Game. Texas had a commanding advantage over Oklahoma in the Harris Interactive, and the two teams were separated by just one point in the USA Today poll, but the computers gave Oklahoma the right to play in the Big 12 Championship Game. Ironically, had the Sooners lost that game, Texas would have most likely ended up in the national title game, as they were No. 3 and considerably ahead of the No. 4 team in the final standings, and would have essentially been rewarded for not playing in the Big 12 Championship Game, and again leading to a team that was not a conference champion going to the national title game.) Although not related to the title game, after the 2007 season, Kansas was chosen to go to the BCS Orange Bowl, even though they had lost to Missouri (who went to the non-BCS Cotton Bowl, despite only losing twice to Oklahoma, and being ranked higher than both Kansas and Big Ten Rose Bowl representative Illinois, who Missouri beat). This, among other games in history, illustrates that late season losses are often more injurious than early season losses.

Finally, critics argued that a team could win a weak conference and be awarded an automatic berth over at-large teams that were perceived to be more deserving. Most of this criticism centered on the Big East after losing Miami, Virginia Tech, and Boston College to the ACC. In 2004, No. 21 Pittsburgh won the Big East with a record of 8–3 and was awarded an automatic bid because they won their conference at the expense of several runner-up teams with much better rankings, such as No. 5 California, No. 7 Georgia, and No. 8 Virginia Tech, that were left out. In 2008, undefeated No. 9 Boise State and No. 11 TCU were left out of the BCS while No. 19 Virginia Tech, winner of the ACC was given a BCS bowl berth. In 2010, Connecticut won the Big East with a record of 8–4 and was awarded an automatic bid to the Fiesta Bowl despite not being ranked in the top 25 of the BCS standings. As a result, the Mountain West Conference campaigned to receive an automatic bid while there were calls for the Big East to lose its AQ status. Another way to fix this problem would be to mandate that if a conference champion finishes with a low ranking (say below 12) that they forfeit their automatic bid, and get put into the pool of "at large" teams that the BCS can choose from. Thus, a higher ranked non-AQ team (or an extra team from other AQ conferences) could be selected by a bowl game. Another solution to this problem that was heavily considered prior to the cessation of the BCS was to eliminate AQ status and allow the bowl committees to select the participants they want provided that the school has a sufficiently high BCS ranking so that no BCS bowl would be forced to take a low-ranking AQ conference champion. This would also allow a third team from the same conference to participate in a BCS bowl, something that is prohibited by the current rules.

== Questions regarding disparities in revenue sharing ==
In addition to concerns about the inclusion of non-AQ (Automatic Qualifying) conference teams in the five BCS bowls, some critics have noted the disparities between the amounts paid to the six AQ conferences and their respective schools, as opposed to other conferences and their own schools.

The official BCS website discusses the payouts for the 2009–2010 BCS bowls.

- Since each AQ conference is guaranteed at least one representative to a BCS game, each conference will receive approximately $21.2 million, plus an additional $6 million should a second conference team be selected. Although each conference has its own arrangement for the distribution of these funds, the average income per school in each conference is as follows (One team selected/Two teams selected):
  - Atlantic Coast (14 teams): $1.767M / $2.667M
  - American Athletic (12 teams): $2.650M / $3.400M
  - Big Ten (12 teams): $1.927M / $2.473M
  - Big 12 (10 teams): $1.767M / $2.667M
  - Pacific-10 (12 teams): $2.120M / $2.720M
  - Southeastern (14 teams): $1.767M / $2.667M
  - With next season's realignment in the Big Ten, Big 12, and Pacific-10 (to be renamed the Pac-12) conferences, these numbers will be adjusted.
- Notre Dame is guaranteed 1/74th of net revenues, or approximately $1.7 million. If selected to play in a BCS bowl, Notre Dame will receive $6 million.
- Independent programs Army and Navy will each receive $100,000 for allowing their teams to participate in the selection for BCS bowls.
- Nine percent, or approximately $12.35 million, is guaranteed in aggregate to Conference USA, the Mid-American, Mountain West, Sun Belt, and Western Athletic conferences. If a team from one of these five conferences plays in a BCS bowl, an additional nine percent (approximately $12.35M) will be given in aggregate to the conferences, and if a second team participates, those conferences will receive an additional $6.0M. These five conferences are composed of a total of 52 teams, broken down as follows:
  - Conference USA – 14 teams
  - Mid-American – 13 teams
  - Mountain West – 12 teams
  - Sun Belt – 11 teams
- Therefore, if the payouts to these conferences were broken down equally per school (which is not the case), this would amount to an average of $237,500 per school. If one team from these conferences were to play in a BCS game, that figure would increase to $519,231 per school. Should two teams be selected, the average per school would rise to $634,615 per school.

As a result, in the best-case scenario schools from the non-AQ conferences would receive approximately 37% of the least of the schools in the AQ conferences, including Notre Dame. These numbers are not the actual amounts paid to each school, but are averaged over the total number of schools.

- Each of the 14 conferences in the Football Championship Subdivision (formerly Division I-AA), will receive $250,000, or a total of $3.5M. The FCS subdivision, consists of 122 football programs in 14 conferences, with 7 schools independent. (It is unclear if the independent schools are included in the BCS payout.) As a result, although the actual distribution will vary significantly, each of the 122 schools will receive an average of $28,689. This represents 1/56th of the amount that Notre Dame (the team with the lowest guaranteed amount) would receive, and 1/209th of the amount that Notre Dame would receive if it receives a BCS bid.
- A breakdown of the BCS non-AQ revenue sharing conducted in 2010 shows the total amounts that the five non-AQ conferences received from all bowls. The coalition of C-USA, MAC, MWC, Sun Belt, and WAC conferences divides half of the BCS revenue equally amongst the five conferences, and the other half into 15 equal shares which are divided by performance. Since Boise State and TCU participated in the Fiesta Bowl, the coalition grossed a total of $24M. As a result, the conferences received and divided the following income (average per school, which likely do not reflect actual amounts, are in parentheses):
  - MWC – $9.8M ($1,088,889)
  - WAC – $7.8M ($866,667)
  - C-USA – $2.8M ($233,333)
  - MAC – $2.1M ($161,538)
  - Sun Belt – $1.5M ($166,667)
- The 2008–2009 BCS Media Guide claims that over the first 10 years of the BCS arrangement, a total of $100 million has been given to the then-50 non-AQ conference Football Bowl Subdivision schools and the 122 Football Championship Subdivision schools. This gives an average of $10M/year, or $58,803 per school year. By comparison, each AQ conference (between eight and twelve schools) is guaranteed $18 million this year, an average of $1.66M per school for the 65 participating institutions.

The disparities between AQ conferences and non-AQ conferences continue outside the Bowl Championship Series to other bowls, but since the payouts for the five BCS bowls are so much greater than other bowls, the BCS has a major impact on revenue distribution paid to the various Football Bowl Subdivision (formerly Division I-A) schools. A 2003 study described the disparities between the different schools. In 2003, there were 24 bowls other than the BCS bowls, creating opportunities for 48 teams to participate in bowl games. Of these 48 teams, 33 were from AQ conferences.

- In 2003, the Big Ten led all conferences with $31.9 million from its seven bowl appearances. By comparison, Conference USA, which led the non-AQ conferences with five bowl appearances, brought in a total of $5.75 million. TCU led all non-AQ schools with $1.37 million from its Liberty bowl appearance.
- A similar study of 2000–2010 bowls shows that the SEC led all conferences with $40.46M from its ten bowl appearances. By comparison, the Mountain West Conference led all non-AQ conferences with $12.9M from its five bowls, including TCU's Fiesta Bowl appearance.
- The BCS itself acknowledges the vast discrepancies between conferences the automatically qualify (AQ conferences) by drawing a comparison between BCS and non-BCS bowls. On their website, it notes that as a result of Utah's 2009 Sugar Bowl appearance, the MWC received $9.8 million. In contrast, the largest payout of any AQ-conference contracted bowl is the MAACO Bowl Las Vegas, which pays the two teams a total of $1.8 million. The conclusion from this is that the Sugar Bowl paid the MWC over 10 times the best of what a non-BCS bowl offered. Should Utah not have been offered the bid, the MWC would have suffered considerably in comparison.

As a result, there has been significant criticism regarding the revenue distribution by bowls, specifically the BCS due to its significantly higher payout to participating teams. This disparity coupled with the comparative difficulty for non-AQ conference teams to participate in BCS bowls, compounded by the uneven split even for non-AQ conference teams competing in a BCS bowl, have raised calls for further reform in the revenue distribution structure. These concerns have also called into question the underlying motivations of the BCS, insofar as revenue is concerned. These issues have been the center of some Congressional inquiries, the threat of a lawsuit by the Attorney General of Utah, and a recent law review article in the Harvard Journal of Sports and Entertainment Law concluding that the BCS violates federal antitrust law.

Finally, these figures cannot describe the vast differences in merchandise and other revenue that schools receive based on participating in higher visibility games, such as the BCS bowls.

== Proposed modifications ==
=== Plus-one system ===
The plus-one system was a suggested modification to the process used by the BCS to determine a national champion.

BCS rankings relied on a combination of polls and computer selection methods to determine relative team rankings, and to identify the top two teams to play in the championship game. Alternate proposals arose due to criticism of BCS rankings, as "the computers held too much power." A "plus-one system" would have taken a different approach from the polls and computer selection method. There were several variants proposed, each of which involved staging a championship game based on the outcome of other bowls:

- In the first variant, "the [top] two teams would meet in a final game after all the other bowls are played." This was the earliest usage of "plus-one" in a BCS context, appearing by January 2002. It was described as "one more game played after the bowls are completed, then the two highest ranked teams in the post-bowl BCS standings would meet for the national title," and "you take the two best teams to come out of the bowls." Some proponents stated that traditional bowl matchups could be maintained (such as the champions of the Big Ten Conference and then-Pacific-10 Conference meeting in the Rose Bowl Game), prior to the championship game.
- In a second variant, appearing by December 2003, two of the BCS bowl games would be used "as semifinals for a four team playoff", followed by the winners facing off in a championship game.
- A third variant, which appeared in January 2004, was described as "taking the four major bowl winners and playing two more rounds to determine a champion on the field," also described as "two games plus one."

== Controversies by season ==
=== 1998–99 season ===
The first year of the BCS ended in controversy when one-loss Kansas State finished third in the final BCS standings, but were passed over for participation in BCS games in favor of Ohio State (ranked 4th) and two-loss Florida (8th). Instead, the Wildcats played in the less prestigious Alamo Bowl against Purdue. That offseason, the BCS adopted the "Kansas State Rule", which provides that the 3rd ranked team (or 4th ranked team if the 3rd ranked team has already qualified as a conference champion) in the final BCS standings is assured an invitation to a BCS game. The rule was first utilized in 2002–03, giving an automatic berth to USC (at the expense of Kansas State, who also finished 11–2 and beat the Trojans head-to-head). The rule was used eight times in all, with Texas earning automatic bids in 2004–05 and 2008–09, Ohio State earning an automatic bid in 2005–06, Michigan receiving an automatic bid in 2006–07, Stanford receiving an automatic bid in 2010–11 and 2011–12, Florida receiving an automatic bid in 2012–13, and Alabama receiving an automatic bid in 2013–14.

The year also provided the first hint of the inherent bias in the system, with Tulane going undefeated yet due to their conference affiliation winding up just 10th in the final BCS rankings and being ignored for a potential at-large bid.

=== 1999–2000 season ===
In the second year of the BCS, Kansas State finished 6th in the BCS standings, but once again received no invitation, instead being passed over in favor of Michigan (ranked 8th). Kansas State's predicament (as well as that of undefeated Tulane the previous year and undefeated Marshall who was denied this year) inaugurated the long-standing media controversies regarding the system. Michigan was also picked ahead of in-state and Big Ten rival Michigan State (ranked 9th), despite the Spartans defeating the Wolverines that year (34–31). Michigan, a perceived national brand team, passing Kansas State and Michigan State led to allegations that the BCS favored paydays over athletic integrity.

=== 2000–01 season ===
Florida State (11–1, ACC Champions) was chosen to play undefeated Oklahoma (12–0, Big 12 champions) in the Orange Bowl for the national championship, despite their one loss coming to another one-loss team, the Miami Hurricanes (10–1, Big East champions), who were ranked No. 2 in both human polls. Adding to the controversy, Miami's one loss came to yet another one loss team, the Pac-10 champion Washington Huskies, leaving three teams with a legitimate claim to play Oklahoma in the National Championship game. Florida State lost to Oklahoma 13–2, while Washington and Miami both easily won their BCS games, adding more fuel to the fire. Washington beat Purdue 34–24 in the Rose Bowl, and Miami beat Florida 37–20 in the Sugar Bowl. As a result of the controversy, the BCS was tweaked in the off-season: a "quality-win" bonus was added to the formula, giving extra credit for beating a top ten team.

=== 2001–02 season ===
In another controversial season, Nebraska was chosen as a national title game participant despite being ranked No. 4 in both human polls and not winning their conference. The Huskers went into their final regular season game at Colorado undefeated, but left Boulder with a 62–36 loss, and Colorado went on to win the Big 12 championship. However, the BCS computers, which contributed to 50% of the rankings, did not take into account time of loss, so one-loss Nebraska came out ahead of two-loss Colorado and one-loss Oregon, the consensus No. 2 in both human polls (but 4th in the BCS). In the end, Nebraska beat Colorado for the No. 2 spot in the BCS poll by .05 points. Nebraska was routed in the national title game, 37–14, by Miami. Similarly, Oregon dominated Colorado in the Fiesta Bowl, 38–16. As a result, the computer's influence in determining the rankings was reduced from 50% to 33.3%, and the human poll ranking increased to 66.6%.

=== 2002–03 season ===
The 2002–03 season was not controversial for the championship game selections or non-AQ selection to the BCS bowl games, but for the BCS allegedly ruining Bowl traditions that had long predated the BCS' existence. The Rose Bowl traditionally featured the champions of the Big Ten and the Pac-10. However, Big Ten co-champion Ohio State, finishing No. 2 in the BCS, had qualified to play in the 2003 Fiesta Bowl for the national championship against Big East champion Miami.

After the national championship was set, the Orange Bowl had the next pick, and invited No. 3 (No. 5 BCS) Iowa, who had shared the Big Ten title with Ohio State. When it was the Rose Bowl's turn to select, the best available team was No. 8 (No. 7 BCS) Oklahoma, the Big 12 champion. When it came time for the Orange Bowl and Sugar Bowl to make a second pick, both wanted Pac-10 co-champion USC. However, a BCS rule stated that if two bowls wanted the same team, the bowl with the higher payout had priority. The Orange Bowl immediately extended an at-large bid to the Trojans and paired them with the Hawkeyes in a Big Ten/Pac-10 "Rose Bowl East" matchup in the 2003 Orange Bowl. The Rose Bowl was left to pair Oklahoma with Pac-10 co-champion Washington State. Rose Bowl committee executive director Mitch Dorger was not pleased with the results, and the 2003 Rose Bowl game had the lowest attendance and first non-sellout since 1944. This was the second consecutive Rose Bowl to not feature the Big Ten and Pac 10 together, as the previous seasons bowl was the championship game, the first time the Rose Bowl did not feature their 2 respective conferences since 1918 and 1919. It was only the 2nd time this had ever happened in the Rose Bowl's history. The Rose Bowl ended with Oklahoma defeating Washington State 34–14, and the Orange Bowl ended with USC defeating Iowa 38–17. As for the Sugar Bowl, there was no controversy surrounding it, as SEC Champion Georgia and ACC Champion Florida State were paired together, with Georgia winning the game 26–13. Meanwhile, Ohio State upset Miami in the Fiesta Bowl, 31–24, to win the national championship and finished as the only undefeated team in the nation, completing the first 14–0 season in college football history.

=== 2003–04 season ===
The 2003–04 season saw three schools from BCS AQ conferences finishing the season with one loss – Oklahoma, LSU and USC. No Division I-A team finished the season undefeated, something that had not happened since 1996, two years before the advent of the BCS.

USC was ranked No. 1 in both human polls, but were burdened by a 2.67 computer ranking due to a weaker schedule and one defeat – to unranked California – during the regular season. Meanwhile, Oklahoma had a perfect undefeated regular season playing a stronger schedule, then lost to No. 13-ranked Kansas State in the Big 12 Championship Game, 35–7. The Sooners had been ranked first in both the human polls and the BCS rankings going into the conference playoff week, but dropped to No. 3 in the human polls after the loss to the Wildcats. The Sooners were still ranked first in the computer rankings by a large enough margin to give the Sooners the top spot in the final BCS rankings (the computer rankings didn't take time of loss into account). LSU earned the second spot based on a stronger computer ranking than USC and a No. 2 human poll ranking, and went on to claim the BCS championship with a 21–14 win over Oklahoma in the Sugar Bowl. USC instead went to the Rose Bowl, where they easily defeated Big Ten champion Michigan (No. 4), and the AP proclaimed the Trojans as national champions. The split in the polls left many LSU (13–1) and USC (12–1) fans displeased.

The college coaches involved in the Coaches Poll were contractually obligated to award their organization's trophy and first place votes to the winner of the BCS championship game, LSU. However, for the first time in the history of the BCS, the BCS Champion was not unanimous. LSU received 60 first-place votes, while USC garnered three. The three coaches who broke ranks and violated their contractual obligation and voted against LSU for the national champion were Lou Holtz of South Carolina, along with two coaches from the conferences that played in that year's Rose Bowl – Mike Bellotti of the Pac-10's Oregon and Ron Turner of the Big Ten's Illinois.

=== 2004–05 season ===
==== Undefeated teams ====
The 2004–05 regular season finished with five undefeated teams for the first time since 1979. Despite having perfect records, Auburn, Utah and Boise State were denied an opportunity to play for the BCS championship. Utah and Boise State's schedules were thought of as weaker than Auburn's (by virtue of playing in the weaker Mountain West and WAC, respectively). However, Utah was the first BCS non-AQ conference team to ever play in a BCS game.

Much of the debate centered on No. 3 Auburn, who went undefeated in the SEC, leading to debates over the strength of schedule, a value that was diminished in the BCS before the season. In the championship game, Oklahoma was crushed by USC, 55–19. Meanwhile, Auburn defeated ACC Champion No. 9 Virginia Tech in the Sugar Bowl 16–13, and No. 6 Utah demolished Big East champion No. 21 Pittsburgh in the Fiesta Bowl, 35–7. This left 3 undefeated teams at the end of the season, with Auburn finishing at No. 2 and Utah at No. 4, and once again leaving many voters wondering who the real champion was.

==== Lobbying for votes ====
Another controversy occurred this season when voters jumped Texas over California in the final regular-season poll. Texas coach Mack Brown publicly lobbied voters to give Texas the final at-large bid. Although the Bears, as Pac-10 runner-up, normally would have had first crack at a Rose Bowl berth, Brown lobbied for and got that berth. Several Associated Press voters were besieged by fan emails and phone calls attempting to sway their votes, apparently spurred from Brown's pleas to rank Texas ahead of other "less deserving teams."

Nine of the 65 AP voters moved Texas ahead of Cal, and three of them were from Texas. In the Coaches Poll, four voters moved Cal down to No. 7 and two to No. 8, when the week before none had them lower than No. 6. Meanwhile, two coaches moved Texas up to No. 3, even though they did not play that week. The Los Angeles Times wrote that accusations were raised about manipulated voting, but the individual votes were not released to prove or disprove the allegations. In the end, Texas gained 23 points on Cal in the AP Poll, and 43 points in the Coaches Poll. This allowed Texas to earn a BCS berth, finishing .0129 points ahead of Cal in the BCS standings after being .0013 points behind. In the Rose Bowl, Texas rallied to defeat Big Ten champion Michigan in a thriller, 38–37.

Following the game, Brown was heavily criticized for his lobbying of votes, while Cal coach Jeff Tedford called for all votes to be released to the public. The Golden Bears lost to Texas Tech in the Holiday Bowl, 45–31. Cal played without two of the highest performing receivers in the NCAA, however, their loss was attributed in many press reports to the Bears' disappointment over being denied their first Rose Bowl appearance in 45 years.

As a result of two straight years of controversy, the Associated Press removed its poll from the BCS formula, instead choosing to give out its own national championship trophy. The AP Poll was replaced by the Harris Interactive Poll the following year.

==== Reggie Bush improper benefits scandal ====
In the years following USC's 2004 season BCS title, it emerged that former Trojan running back Reggie Bush, who played for the team in 2004 (and 2005), had received illegal gifts in violation of NCAA rules. The subsequent NCAA investigation confirmed this, and the Trojan football program was hit with severe sanctions in the summer of 2010. Among these were the vacating of the last two wins of 2004 (including the Orange Bowl) and all wins in 2005 (they lost the Rose Bowl to Texas). After USC's appeal was denied, the BCS officially stripped it of the 2004 BCS title in 2011 and left the title for that year vacant.

=== 2006–07 season ===
Going into the final poll, undefeated Boise State and four one-loss teams (Louisville, Michigan, Wisconsin and Florida) were up for a spot against undefeated Ohio State in the BCS National Championship game. Louisville (11–1, Big East champions), and Boise State were given less consideration because of a perceived lack of schedule strength, while Wisconsin (11–1) was two steps removed from Ohio State (they lost to Michigan, who lost to Ohio State, and Wisconsin and Ohio State did not play).

Michigan lost to Ohio State 42–39 in the regular season finale (giving the Buckeyes the Big Ten championship), but were still ranked ahead of Florida and behind USC going into the final ballot. Florida defeated Arkansas in the SEC Championship Game, and No. 2 USC lost to UCLA, leaving Michigan and Florida as one-loss teams who both claimed they deserved to play for the national championship. Ultimately, Florida passed Michigan into the No. 2 spot by a mere .0101 points. This small difference was a result of the human polls (USA Today's Coaches' Poll and Harris Interactive Poll) ranking Florida above Michigan, while the computer polls had the two teams tied for second.

Michigan, which was automatically guaranteed an at-large berth by virtue of its No. 3 ranking, went to the Rose Bowl, which they lost to USC 32–18. Florida won the national championship by impressively beating Ohio State, 41–14. Florida received all but one of the 65 first-place votes in the final Associated Press poll (the other went to Boise State, who won the Fiesta Bowl over Oklahoma). At the conclusion of the season, Wisconsin and Louisville both finished the season with one loss, while Boise State was the only undefeated team in the nation.

Because of a BCS rule allowing only two teams from each conference to play in BCS bowl games, highly ranked Wisconsin and Auburn were not eligible for selection to a BCS game. Wisconsin was excluded because Ohio State and Michigan represented the Big Ten, and Auburn was excluded because LSU and Florida represented the SEC, even though Auburn defeated LSU 7–3 and Florida 27–17 during the season. LSU earned the at-large bid on the strength of its 31–26 victory over SEC West champion Arkansas, while the Razorbacks defeated then No. 2 Auburn 27–10 on the road. Auburn's 37–15 loss at home to a reeling Georgia team also ended its chances at the BCS.

An omission of the rule still would not have been enough for Auburn to secure a berth, as Wisconsin would have likely been the final at-large bid. The final BCS poll had seven teams from the SEC and the Big Ten ranked in the top twelve, but by the rule only two from each conference were eligible to play in BCS games, offering the opportunity to argue that both conferences are over-ranked, that the Big Ten schedule does not produce a true conference champion, or that the limit of 2 teams from any one conference is inappropriate.

=== 2007–08 season ===
In a season full of upsets, the top two teams in the polls lost on the same weekend each of the final two weeks, sending the BCS into chaos heading into the selection of the two teams to play for the national championship. On November 23, top-ranked LSU lost in triple overtime to Arkansas. This was the Tigers' second triple-overtime loss of the season, with the other to Kentucky. The following day, No. 4 Missouri beat No. 2 Kansas and took the top spot in the BCS for the following week. This created the interesting prospect of No. 1 Missouri playing its final game of the season as three-point underdogs against Oklahoma. On December 1, Missouri was defeated by Oklahoma in the Big 12 Championship Game. No. 2 West Virginia was also stunned at home by unranked Pittsburgh in the annual Backyard Brawl game. Meanwhile, Ohio State, who was idle for the final two weeks, climbed the rankings from No. 5 to No. 1. Hawaii capped off an undefeated season (the only such team going into the bowl season), beating Washington and securing a BCS appearance for the first time in school history. However, as with Boise State in the previous season, Hawaii did not play for the BCS Championship because the Warriors' schedule was deemed too weak, adding to the ongoing controversy regarding the subjectivity and how easy it is to manipulate the strength of schedule element in determining rankings. In fact, with Hawaii's loss in the Sugar Bowl, the 2007–08 season was the first since the 2003–04 season (and only the second in the BCS era) with no teams finishing the entire season undefeated.

In another irony, No. 6 Missouri was shut out of the BCS entirely when No. 8 Kansas was selected as one of three at-large teams. The Tigers finished higher in the BCS standings and had defeated the Jayhawks a week before the Big 12 title game. However, Kansas received a bid to the Orange Bowl; Orange Bowl officials said that they picked Kansas because the Jayhawks had only one loss, while Missouri had two losses, both to Big 12 champion Oklahoma. Since BCS rules did not allow more than two teams from one conference to get a bid, Missouri was denied an at-large bid because of Kansas' invitation to the Orange Bowl and Oklahoma's invitation to the Fiesta Bowl. Instead, Missouri crushed Arkansas 38–7 in the Cotton Bowl. Kansas stunned No. 3 Virginia Tech in the Orange Bowl 24–21, and Oklahoma was trounced by West Virginia 48–28 in the Fiesta Bowl, making no clear argument either way.

Before "Championship Saturday", LSU was ranked No. 7 and Georgia was No. 4. However, after No. 1 Missouri and No. 2 West Virginia lost, LSU was catapulted to No. 2 based on a 21–14 win over No. 14 Tennessee in the SEC Championship Game. Many argued that the Bulldogs should not play for the national title because they didn't play for—let alone win—the SEC Championship. ESPN's Kirk Herbstreit served as point man for the attack on the Bulldogs, ironically one year after pleading for an Ohio State-Michigan rematch after the Wolverines failed to win their conference. The Bulldogs and Vols finished with identical 6–2 records atop the SEC East, but Tennessee represented the division in the championship game by virtue of beating Georgia 35–14 in October. Virginia Tech had been ranked No. 6, above LSU, but had to settle for the No. 3 slot, despite a convincing win over No. 11 Boston College in the ACC Championship Game. Voters were likely influenced by LSU's crushing 48–7 defeat of Virginia Tech early in the season. Computer rankings placed Virginia Tech (0.960) and LSU (0.950) No. 1, and No. 2, respectively. The top four teams in the BCS standings were No. 1 Ohio State, No. 2 LSU, No. 3 Virginia Tech, and No. 4 Oklahoma.

Ultimately, LSU defeated Ohio State 38–24, marking the second straight season that the Buckeyes lost the championship game to an SEC opponent. LSU received 60 of a possible 65 first-place votes in the final AP poll, the fewest for a BCS champion since 2004. Georgia, another SEC team, was second in the poll and received three first-place votes. The final two first place votes went USC and Kansas, ranked No. 3 and No. 7 respectively.

=== 2008–09 season ===
In the Big 12 South division, there was a three-way tie for the division champion between Oklahoma, Texas, and Texas Tech (all one-loss teams). The winner of that division would likely play in the national championship game if it beat Missouri in the Big 12 Championship Game. Oklahoma lost to Texas 45–35, then Texas lost to Texas Tech 39–33, and then Texas Tech lost to Oklahoma 65–21. In the Big 12, the BCS standings were used to break this tie, causing the teams to jockey for votes in the human polls. In the end, Oklahoma edged out Texas for the right to represent the Big 12 South in the conference championship game. Despite the head-to-head loss to the Longhorns earlier in the season, the computer rankings ranked the Sooners' schedule ahead of the Longhorns. Another BCS AQ conference, the SEC, merely uses the BCS standings to eliminate one team in a three-way tie and then use head to head to determine tiebreakers, which would have worked in Texas' favor.

Going into the conference championship games, only four teams—Alabama, Utah, Ball State and Boise State—were undefeated. However, in the event of an Alabama loss, Utah, Ball State and Boise State had no chance at a title game berth because their schedules were deemed too weak, once again igniting a controversy about schedule strength. As it turned out, Alabama lost to one-loss Florida in the SEC Championship Game, vaulting the Gators to the second spot in the final BCS rankings and a matchup in the title game against Oklahoma. Alabama fell to fourth, behind Texas. In addition, Ball State lost the MAC championship to Buffalo, which denied any chance they had at getting a BCS berth.

Utah and Boise State both finished in the top 15 of the BCS standings and were thus eligible for BCS at-large spots. It was generally understood, however, that only one team would get a berth, as it would be hard to justify allowing a second mid-major conference team into a BCS bowl over an AQ conference runner-up. This difficulty in "justifying" both non-automatic qualifying teams going to BCS bowls led a number of BCS critics to point to this situation as being reflective of the arrogance and assumption of higher quality of the AQ conferences that is not borne out by any statistics or their win–loss records, but rather is based on records and reputations. Utah qualified automatically as the highest ranked (in the top 12) non-AQ conference champion and defeated Alabama in the Sugar Bowl. No. 9 Boise State and No. 11 TCU were matched up in the Poinsettia Bowl, marking the first time in history that a bowl featured two teams from non-AQ conferences ranked higher than both participants in a BCS bowl game in the same season (the Orange Bowl matched No. 12 Cincinnati and No. 19 Virginia Tech). TCU defeated Boise State 17–16, and Utah won the Sugar Bowl to finish as the nation's only undefeated team and ranked No. 2 in the AP poll.

After the season, the Mountain West Conference made a proposal at the BCS commissioners' annual spring meetings that a selection committee replace the polls and computers, an eight-team playoff system put in place, and changes to the automatic qualifier rules. On June 24, 2009, the BCS presidential oversight committee rejected the plan.

=== 2009–10 season ===
By mid-October, it was clear that Florida and Alabama would face off in the 2009 SEC Championship Game, and the winner would play in the BCS title game. It was also generally believed that Texas would get the other spot if it won the 2009 Big 12 Championship Game, despite concerns about a weak non-conference schedule and a surprising lack of quality teams in the Big 12. Ultimately, in a repeat of the 2004–05 season, five teams finished the season undefeated—Alabama, Texas, Cincinnati, TCU, and Boise State. Going into the final weekend of the regular season, it was already certain that at least two teams would finish undefeated due to the SEC title game matchup between Alabama and Florida, as well as TCU having already completed an undefeated season.

Texas won the Big 12 title game, and with it a spot in the BCS title game, in controversial fashion. As the game clock appeared to run out with Nebraska winning 12–10; officials ruled that the time left on the clock was reviewable and ordered 1 second put back on the clock, allowing the Longhorns to kick a field goal for a 13–12 win, a result that left then-Nebraska coach Bo Pelini claiming that it was part of a BCS conspiracy. Earlier, Alabama trounced Florida in the SEC title game to earn the other slot.

Boise State, Cincinnati and TCU all believed they had a chance at being in the championship game if Texas lost. However, despite a convincing season-opening win over eventual Pac-10 champion Oregon, Boise State's schedule was once again deemed too weak for a spot in the title game. TCU also thought it would have a shot, since by this time the Mountain West had been reckoned as the strongest non-AQ conference. Cincinnati, however, probably had the strongest claim of the three. Despite being ranked behind TCU going into championship weekend, the Bearcats were the undefeated champion of an AQ conference, rather than an at-large team like the Horned Frogs or Broncos. Indeed, any realistic chance of Boise State or TCU getting in the title game ended with Cincinnati's season-ending victory over Pittsburgh, which ensured that at least two teams from AQ conferences (Cincinnati and the SEC champion) would finish undefeated. Cincinnati passed TCU to finish 3rd in the final BCS standings, but with the margin as slim as it was and three of the six BCS computers having placed Texas behind Cincinnati but ahead of TCU, no conclusions can be drawn as to what might have happened if Texas had lost. Cincinnati was routed by Florida in the Sugar Bowl, 51–24, while Alabama won the national title over Texas, 37–21.

==== Non-AQ Bowl Selection Controversy ====
Unrelated to the title game was the controversy regarding the bowl selections. While at No. 6, Boise State was able to earn an at-large berth, the announcement that they would be playing No. 4 TCU in the Fiesta Bowl caused a massive outcry and also focused the controversy on the broader issue of truly fair access to Bowl opportunities, rather than just appearances. As the two "BCS Busters" would be matched up against each other and would thereby be denied the opportunity to face a top team from one of the six BCS AQ conferences, instead providing a rematch of a non-BCS bowl from the previous year (see above), the BCS came off looking "at best, a cowardly cartel". Placing two teams from non-AQ conferences in the same bowl also contradicted the previous assertion that non-AQ schools are less likely to receive at-large bids because the bowls prefer the superior drawing power of the big schools and their highly mobile fanbases—hence undefeated Boise State's omission from the BCS the previous year in favor of two-loss Ohio State. For this reason, some were calling this match up the "Separate but Equal Bowl", or the "Fiasco Bowl."

The issue of far more consequence brought to the fore as a result of this game was that of access to equal and fair competition, the access to the chance to compete for and win the "Big Game" in the first place. There was a tremendous amount of criticism surrounding the 2010 Fiesta Bowl team pairing. Many argued that the BCS was terrified of a BCS non-AQ conference team defeating a BCS AQ conference team and bringing into question ever more starkly the entire premise of the BCS's existence, that teams from AQ conferences are somehow superior to non-AQ conference teams and are therefore more deserving to play for the "National Championship". A defeat of a top ranked AQ conference team would help affirm that this premise was false – as the impressive record of non-AQ teams in BCS Bowls (4–2 against BCS AQ teams) already hints at. Consequently, the BCS paired TCU and BSU together so that the possibility of an embarrassment of an AQ school, and by extension the entire system's validity, was eliminated. Boise State ended up beating TCU in the Fiesta Bowl, 17–10.

=== 2010–11 season ===
During TCU's second undefeated regular season run in a row (their only loss being the 2010 Fiesta Bowl against Boise State), and while Boise State was still undefeated prior to losing to Nevada, E. Gordon Gee, the president of Ohio State and formerly president of two other BCS AQ conference schools, made public comments to the Associated Press stating that schools from BCS non-AQ conferences should not be allowed to compete for the BCS Championship. "I do know, having been both a Southeastern Conference president and a Big Ten president, that it's like murderer's row every week for these schools. We do not play the Little Sisters of the Poor. We play very fine schools on any given day. So I think until a university runs through that gauntlet that there's some reason to believe that they not be the best teams to [be] in the big ballgame." These comments sparked immediate criticism from commentators, coaches from non-AQ conferences and much of the general public.

Ironically, TCU went on to win the Rose Bowl over Wisconsin (who had defeated the Buckeyes earlier in the season), and billboards appeared in the Columbus area congratulating TCU on its win that were signed by "The Little Sisters of the Poor" as a jibe to Dr. Gee's remarks. He nominally apologized for after the game, and later performed community service at a nursing home operated by a convent group known as Little Sisters of the Poor, although he added that he had no idea they existed when he made the comments.

The 2010 season found three teams, Oregon, Auburn and TCU all with undefeated records. The teams from the two automatic qualifying conferences, Oregon (Pac-10) and Auburn (SEC), were selected over the Horned Frogs for the 2011 National Championship game due to TCU's weak strength of schedule. Auburn defeated Oregon for the title, 22–19.

At this point, the controversy surrounding the BCS became a topic of conversation within the United States government. In 2008 U.S. Senator Orrin Hatch (R-Utah) had said that he would hold congressional hearings on the BCS in the future after his Utah team failed to play in the national championship game. Following up on Senator Hatch's actions in the Senate, in April 2011 the Attorney General of Utah announced that he would be initiating a class action anti-trust lawsuit against the BCS, despite the fact that Utah is joining to the Pacific-10 Conference, which is an automatic qualifying conference. In May 2011 the U.S. Justice Department sent a letter to the NCAA asking for a detailed explanation about why FBS football was the only NCAA sport that the NCAA did not 1) have a playoff system in place to determine a champion and 2) why the NCAA had abrogated its responsibility to do so and given the authority to determine the NCAA Champion to an outside group such as the BCS. These suits were eventually dropped when it became clear the BCS was moving toward a playoff a few years later. https://www.deseret.com/2012/10/27/20508821/utah-a-g-drops-antitrust-investigation-of-college-football-s-bcs-system-for-now/

The Fiesta Bowl scandal in particular was the catalyst that opened the BCS up to Federal interest for the first time, largely because the government is concerned not only about the BCS's stifling of fair competition, but more importantly for the Federal Government about the possibility of fraud and tax evasion, if the BCS has violated the rules governing tax exempt organizations and groups that control tax exempt organizations. If the BCS Bowls, who are each separate entities yet also part of the BCS as a whole as well were to lose their tax exempt status, they could be liable for back taxes totaling hundreds of millions of dollars. The Fiesta Bowl abuses – especially those regarding alleged illegal and improper political contributions, excessive executive compensation and unjustified reimbursement payments, and the making of excessive, interest free and un-repaid loans – are precisely the types of abuses that would justify the Internal Revenue Service in stripping the BCS, and each BCS Bowl and possibly even each AQ conference school (although that is highly unlikely) of their tax exempt status. In the worst-case scenario the BCS could also be subject to forfeiture and seizure proceedings. While the worst penalties are unlikely to be enforced, even the milder penalties, such as a determination of a cartel and trust, would have devastating consequences for the BCS and the current system. The court could also order a resolution of the current unfair competition inherent in the structure of the BCS, including ordering a playoff system and ordering the Bowls to participate. Despite Big 10 Commissioner Delaney's assertion that if the BCS were to fold they would "go back to the old system" if a court ordered a solution the Conferences would have no choice in the matter, and would be required – especially if a determination is made that the BCS is an illegal trust or cartel – to do whatever the court says, including submitting to federal oversight of the Bowl's and Bowl teams' finances and administration, and conducting a 4, 8 or 16 team playoff, or whatever other remedy the court ordered in their holding. The Department of Justice inquiry is far and away the most potentially dangerous legal situation that the BCS has faced to date.

In February 2012 former Fiesta Bowl chief executive John Junker pleaded guilty to one felony count of solicitation to commit a fraud scheme. He was sentenced later under his terms of his plea bargain. This plea dealt with the scheme the Fiesta Bowl was involved in to solicit from, and then reimburse, employees for political donations to politicians. Two people still with the Fiesta Bowl pleaded guilty to misdemeanor charges of making a prohibited campaign contribution, each paying fines and placed on probation for one year.

On the field, for the first time, an ineligible-player situation contaminated two of the five BCS bowls in this season before they were played. In December 2010, five Ohio State players were implicated in an illegal-benefits scandal preceding the 2011 Sugar Bowl. Though the five players were suspended for five 2011 season games apiece, not only was Ohio State still allowed to play in the 2011 Sugar Bowl (which also resulted in Wisconsin playing in a Rose Bowl they otherwise would not have been allowed in, as Michigan State would have the Big Ten's Rose Bowl berth had Ohio State been removed from the three-way tie which allowed Wisconsin to gain the berth), but so were the five players. After defeating Arkansas, the scandal grew, including open deception by Ohio State coach Jim Tressel. As a result, Tressel has been forced out and, on July 11, 2011, Ohio State vacated all of its wins in an effort to reduce their penalties.

=== 2011–12 season ===
By late October, it was clear that the winner of the November 5 game between LSU and Alabama would win the SEC West title, and that team would get a spot in the BCS title game if it won the rest of its games and the 2011 SEC Championship Game. LSU defeated Alabama 9–6, putting it on the inside track for the championship game.

The identity of the other title game participant was less clear. Initially, Alabama's loss seemed to clear the way for Oklahoma State, which jumped to No. 2 in the BCS rankings. However, the Cowboys lost in double overtime at Iowa State on November 18, dropping them to fourth in the BCS rankings, while Alabama leaped to second. This raised the possibility of a rematch between the Tigers and Crimson Tide if both teams won out.

On the final weekend of the regular season, LSU routed Georgia 42–10 to win the SEC championship and clinch a berth in the national title game. A few hours later, Oklahoma State dismantled Oklahoma 44–10, in Stillwater, to win the Big 12 title, assuring it of no worse than a bid in the 2012 Fiesta Bowl (which hosts the Big 12 champion unless it finishes in the top two of the BCS rankings). A week earlier, Alabama finished its season with a 42–14 flogging of Auburn. While Oklahoma State had seemingly been eliminated from title contention two weeks earlier, the Cowboys reentered the discussion with their convincing defeat of the Sooners. Ultimately, Oklahoma State had the second-highest computer average, while Alabama finished second in both human polls. The Tide's human-poll lead over the Cowboys was large enough to place them second in the final BCS rankings by only .0086 of a point—the smallest margin between No. 2 and No. 3 in BCS history—sending them to the BCS title game against LSU and locking Oklahoma State into the Fiesta Bowl, in which they beat Stanford 41–38.

In the run-up to the title game, most AP Poll voters said that unless Alabama won impressively, they were at least willing to consider voting LSU as national champion even if Alabama won. At least three voters said they would definitely vote the Tigers No. 1 unless the Crimson Tide won decisively. This led to the possibility of a split national championship, as the Coaches Poll is contractually obligated to vote its national championship to the winner of the BCS title game. Ultimately, Alabama defeated LSU 21–0, and hours later was a near-unanimous choice as national champion, taking all but five first-place votes in the AP Poll. The "rematch" bowl increased calls for a requirement that for any team to qualify for the national championship game, they must also have won their conference championship, either shared or outright. This idea was part of the discussions held after the end of the 2011 season as the BCS discussed changes for the next BCS cycle and contract period.

Also for the first time, the idea of a "plus one" playoff was also discussed by the 13 conference athletic directors and Notre Dame's athletic director as they began to realize that the public opinion regarding a playoff had reached such a state that inaction might result in government action, based on the Sherman Anti-Trust Act.

The title game debate had a ripple effect on the Sugar Bowl. Normally, the Sugar Bowl gets the first pick of SEC teams. However, with LSU and Alabama's selections to the title game, no other SEC teams were eligible for BCS bids. Ultimately, the Sugar Bowl selected No. 11 Virginia Tech and No. 13 Michigan, bypassing No. 7 Boise State, No. 8 Kansas State and No. 12 Baylor. The selection of Virginia Tech drew particular ire, since the Hokies had gone 1–2 against ranked teams, with the two losses coming by 48 points—including a 38–10 rout at the hands of Clemson in the ACC Championship Game. Additionally, Michigan had just barely qualified for a BCS bid; it finished just two spots above the cutoff for a team from an AQ conference to get a bid without winning its conference. By at least one account, it was the lowest-ranked at-large team from an AQ conference to receive a bid in the BCS' history, with only Illinois in 2007 equaling the #13 spot (and Illinois at least had the "second-place clause" in their favor as they were invited to the Rose Bowl with top-ranked Big Ten Champion Ohio State headed for the National Championship Game). Michigan ended up beating Virginia Tech 23–20 in Overtime.

Notably, this season marked the first since 2005 that no non-AQ teams were selected. Boise State was fifth in the initial BCS rankings, but its cause was significantly hobbled when it lost to TCU 36–35 on November 12, effectively handing the Mountain West title to the Horned Frogs. Houston appeared well on its way to a bid after an undefeated regular season placed them sixth in the next-to-last BCS rankings. However, the Cougars lost in the 2011 Conference USA Football Championship Game to Southern Miss. This left Boise State and TCU as the only non-AQ teams in serious contention for a bid. However, TCU's chances for a bid ended when they finished 18th in the final BCS rankings, and accepted an invitation to the Poinsettia Bowl against WAC champion Louisiana Tech Bulldogs, whom they defeated. There continued to be confusion and speculation in the press, however, about how TCU's BCS ranking was actually computed.

=== 2012–13 season ===
Three bowl-eligible teams went into the weekend of November 17 still undefeated: Kansas State, Oregon, and Notre Dame (Ohio State was also undefeated, but was ineligible for the postseason due to NCAA penalties). Kansas State and Oregon's human-poll leads over Notre Dame were large enough that it would be very difficult for the Fighting Irish to overtake the Ducks and Wildcats if all three won out. However, Kansas State was routed by Baylor 52–24, while Oregon was upended by Stanford 17–14 in overtime. Hours earlier, Notre Dame defeated Wake Forest 38–0. When the BCS rankings were released the next day, Notre Dame vaulted to the top spot in the BCS standings, and locked up a berth in the national championship game a week later with a season-ending win over USC.

Those same rankings put Alabama at No. 2 behind Notre Dame, with Georgia close behind at No. 3. Both teams had already clinched berths in the 2012 SEC Championship Game. Once again, the SEC Championship Game became a de facto semifinal game for a national championship berth. With a thrilling come from behind victory, Alabama won 32–28, and easily defeated Notre Dame in the title game, 42–14.

Going into the final week of the season, three non-AQ teams were in contention for a BCS bid--Kent State, Northern Illinois and Boise State, who were ranked 17th, 20th and 21st, respectively. Northern Illinois defeated Kent State 44–37 in the MAC Championship Game, while Boise State closed out its season with a 27–21 win over Colorado State. The final BCS standings had Northern Illinois at 15th. Under BCS rules, a non-AQ team must finish 16th or higher in the BCS rankings and be higher than at least one AQ champion to get a BCS berth. Since the Huskies were ranked ahead of two AQ conference champions — Big East champ Louisville (21st) and Big Ten champ Wisconsin (unranked), this was enough to give the Huskies a berth in the BCS, making them the first and only Mid American Conference team to ever participate in a BCS game.

The inclusion of the Huskies over a higher-profile team from an AQ conference was criticized by analysts, most notably ESPN's Jesse Palmer, David Pollack and Kirk Herbstreit, who claimed Northern Illinois had not played a legitimate schedule. However, computer rankings showed that Northern Illinois had a stronger schedule than Boise State, as the weakness of the Mountain West due to the departures of TCU, BYU and Utah resulted in the Broncos having the lowest computer-ranking percentage of any team in the BCS standings. The Huskies earned a bid to the Orange Bowl, where they lost to Florida State, 31–10.

=== 2013–14 season ===
Perhaps fittingly, the final year of the BCS produced no controversy at season's end. In mid-November, Alabama, Florida State, Ohio State and Baylor were all undefeated and ranked 1 to 4 respectively, but Alabama and Florida State held the number 1 and 2 rankings in the BCS poll. Baylor's national title hopes effectively ended on November 24 with a 49–17 thumping by Oklahoma State, and a week later, Alabama's hopes for a third straight title ended when it was upset by Auburn 34–28. When the BCS rankings were updated on December 1, Florida State moved up to No. 1, while Ohio State moved to second and Auburn jumped to third.

Any debate regarding the title game matchup ended when Ohio State lost 34–24 to Michigan State in the Big Ten Championship Game, while Auburn defeated Missouri 59–42 to win the SEC Championship. Auburn vaulted to second in the final rankings, setting up a title game matchup with Florida State. The Seminoles won the last ever BCS National Championship with a 34–31 win over the Tigers, thanks to a touchdown with 11 seconds remaining in the game.

Continuing their pattern of bypassing higher ranked teams, the Sugar Bowl committee chose #11 Oklahoma over #10 Oregon to play against #3 Alabama. Both teams won their bowl games convincingly, with Oklahoma defeating Alabama 45–31 and Oregon dominating Texas 30–7 in the Alamo Bowl. As a result, no clear argument could be made for either school.

== Support ==
While there is substantial criticism aimed at the BCS system from coaches, media and fans alike, there is also some support for the system. Supporters claim there are several key advantages that the BCS has over a playoff system. Under the BCS, a single defeat is extremely detrimental to a team's prospects for a national championship. Supporters contend that this creates a substantial incentive for teams to do their best to win every game. Under a playoff system, front-running teams could be in a position of safety at the end of the regular season and could pull or greatly reduce their use of top players in order to protect them from injuries or give them recovery time (this happens frequently in the NFL). This is very unlikely to happen in the BCS system where a team in the running for a No. 1 or No. 2 ranking at the end of the year would be nearly certain to be punished in the polls enough for a loss that the team would be eliminated from contention.

Supporters also note that for all the controversy the BCS generates about which two teams are the best in the nation, it does ensure that when there is a clear-cut top two, the national championship will be decided on the field. For example, Miami (FL) and Ohio State in 2002 were the only undefeated teams in the nation; both teams had only a couple of close contests. Under the BCS system, these two teams got to play for the championship. Before the advent of the BCS, they would have never met on the field since Ohio State would have been contractually obligated to play in the Rose Bowl. Had they both won, there would have likely been a split national championship.

The NCAA, the governing organization of all collegiate sports, has no official process for determining its FBS (Div. 1-A) champion. Instead, FBS champions are chosen by what the NCAA calls in its official list of champions "selecting organizations".

In 1997, pursuant to a legally binding contract which is now being examined and questioned by the United States Department of Justice in the early stages of an investigation into whether the BCS is an illegal trust or not, all 119 FBS (now 125) universities chose the BCS as their sanctioned selecting organization. The legality of the underlying contracts that bind the schools and bowls to the BCS are now under considerable government and media scrutiny. Under the current, legally questionable contracts, the BCS: "...is managed by the commissioners of the 11 NCAA Division I-A conferences, the director of athletics at the University of Notre Dame, and representatives of the bowl organizations. "...is a five-game arrangement for post-season college football that is designed to match the two top-rated teams in a national championship game and to create exciting and competitive matchups between eight other highly regarded teams in four other games".

This contract has no effect on any other selecting organization; it operates only on its signatories—the member universities of the FBS. Fans or media might argue, opine and arrive at differing results from those of the BCS, but the universities (teams) are bound by the latter's processes.

Still, some proponents of the BCS recognize the inconsistency that the system offers. An article taken from BCSfootball.org titled "Playoff Smayoff! We Don't Need It" openly states "...trust the process and we will get it right 80 percent of the time." As one sports writer argued, "Is it too much to ask for a system that gets it right every time" instead of getting it right 4 out of 5 times? FBS football is the only sport in which the NCAA has not mandated a specific bracketed playoff system, with even Division I FCS conducting a playoff every year.

== See also ==
- College football playoff debate
- College Football Playoff, the successor system to the Bowl Championship Series used to determine the NCAA Division I Football Bowl Subdivision national champion
