= College football playoff debate =

College football controversy

The college football playoff debate was a very hot topic of discussion concerning college football in the United States prior to 2012. This debate—among fans, journalists, conference representatives, government officials, university administrators, coaches and players—concerned whether or not the postseason format of NCAA Division I-A (later the Football Bowl Subdivision, or FBS) should be changed or modified.

Playoff proponents argued that a bracket-style single-elimination tournament should be put in place to select a champion. This would, at first, replace the poll-based selection of an annual champion among major college teams, which had been used since the early years of college football. Debate about a playoff tournament dated to at least 1971.

The Bowl Championship Series (BCS) system was established prior to the 1998 season—it selected two teams to compete for college football's top-tier national championship. During the BCS era, there were numerous controversies about which teams should play for this championship. This led to further debate about replacing the BCS with a bracket-style playoff, while others advocated for a simpler "plus-one" format, which would have created a single national championship game with participants selected after the conclusion of the traditional bowl season. Several polls showed significant support among college football fans for a playoff to replace the BCS.

In 2012, the commissioners of the BCS announced that a four-team College Football Playoff (CFP) would replace the BCS following the 2013–14 college football season. In January 2015, Ohio State beat Oregon, 42–20, to win the first-ever College Football Playoff National Championship game. In 2022, organizers announced that the College Football Playoff would expand to a twelve-team playoff, starting with the 2024 season.

== For a playoff ==
Playoff proponents argued against the internal validity of the Bowl Championship Series (BCS) national championship and lamented that the participants of the BCS National Championship Game were decided by the Coaches Poll and AP poll, rather than via on-field competition such as with head-to-head, bracket-style tournaments in other major sports and at other levels of college football. Proponents occasionally accused the Bowl Championship Series of financial conflict with respect to the money earned in bowl games and the allocation of those resources.

Barack Obama spoke out in favor of a playoff, before and after the 2008 U.S. presidential election. On November 18, 2008, in his first interview as president-elect, Steve Kroft of 60 Minutes ended the interview with a question about the topic. Obama replied:

I think any sensible person would say that if you've got a bunch of teams who play throughout the season, and many of them have one loss or two losses, there's no clear decisive winner that we should be creating a playoff system. Eight teams. That would be three rounds, to determine a national champion. It would add three extra weeks to the season. You could trim back on the regular season. I don't know any serious fan of college football who has disagreed with me on this. So, I'm gonna throw my weight around a little bit. I think it's the right thing to do.

== Proposals ==
Several proposals for change to the BCS were presented. The BCS commissioners contemplated changing to a "plus-one" format, which would create a national championship game at the conclusion of the traditional bowl season with the two participants selected among bowl game winners. Ultimately, the commissioners rejected any immediate action and tabled the discussion on whether to establish a plus-one format.

Other proposed formats included a bracket-style playoff championship with 8, 10, 12, 16, 32, or 64 teams. Although popular among college football fans, these formats gained little momentum within the circle of BCS commissioners. The official response from the BCS to these formats was: "if it ain't broke, don't fix it".

United States Senator Orrin Hatch (R-Utah) indicated that he would hold congressional hearings on the BCS after the 2008 Utah Utes football team of the Mountain West Conference (MWC) were not a participant in the BCS national championship game after finishing the regular season undefeated. Later, the MWC itself raised a postseason proposal at the BCS commissioners' annual spring meetings in conjunction with the 2010 BCS title game. The MWC commissioner argued for a selection committee to replace the BCS ranking system, the establishment of an eight-team playoff, and a revision to the automatic qualifier rules.

A bracket-style tournament was eventually announced on June 26, 2012, to adopt a four-team playoff system. This was set to go into effect following the 2013 season, utilizing a selection committee to determine which teams would play for the championship in a four-team playoff. This became the College Football Playoff (CFP), with the first College Football Playoff National Championship game held in January 2015, following the 2014 season.

== Governmental intervention ==
According to CBSSports.com wire reports and information obtained by the Associated Press, Senator Orrin Hatch received a letter from the justice department concerning the possibility of a legal review of the BCS. The letter, received on January 29, 2010, states that the Obama administration will explore options to establish a college football playoff including (a) an antitrust lawsuit against the BCS, (b) legal action under Federal Trade Commission consumer protection laws, (c) encouragement of the NCAA to take control of the college football postseason, (d) the establishment of an agency to review the costs and benefits of adopting a playoff system, and (e) continued legislation in favor of a playoff system. Assistant Attorney General Ronald Weich writes, "The administration shares your belief that the lack of a college football national championship playoff ...raises important questions affecting millions...." BCS Executive Director Bill Hancock responded to the letter that the BCS complies with all laws and is supported by the participating Division I universities.

Following up on Senator Hatch's actions in the Senate, in April 2011 the Attorney General of Utah announced that he would be initiating a class action antitrust lawsuit against the BCS, despite the fact that Utah is moving to the Pacific-10 Conference, which is an automatic qualifying conference. In March 2011 the U.S. Justice Department sent a formal letter of notice to the NCAA asking for a detailed explanation about why FBS football was the only NCAA sport that the NCAA did not 1) have a playoff system in place to determine a champion and 2) why the NCAA had abrogated its responsibility to do so and given the authority to determine the NCAA Champion to an outside group such as the BCS. The Justice Department's investigation and Utah Attorney General's lawsuit are both aimed at forcing the BCS to open its books, which they are as a non-profit required to do every year and have never done, and at determining whether the BCS is an illegal trust or cartel based on Sherman Antitrust Act of 1890, the Clayton Antitrust Act of 1914 and the Robinson-Patman Anti-Price Discrimination Act of 1936. Two more states Attorneys General are said to be considering joining the Utah lawsuit, and the investigation by the Justice Department will probably include a minute and extensive examination of the Fiesta Bowl Scandal as well as conducting complete audits of the other BCS Bowls, the BCS itself and possibly even the schools of the 6 BCS Automatic Qualification Conferences.

The Fiesta Bowl scandal in particular was the catalyst that opened the BCS up to Federal interest for the first time, largely because the government is concerned not only about the BCS's stifling of fair competition, but more importantly for the Federal Government about the possibility of fraud and tax evasion, if the BCS has violated the rules governing tax exempt organizations and groups that control tax exempt organizations. If the BCS Bowls, who are each separate entities yet also part of the BCS as a whole as well were to lose their tax exempt status, they could be liable for back taxes totaling hundreds of millions of dollars. The Fiesta Bowl abuses – especially those regarding alleged illegal and improper political contributions, excessive executive compensation and unjustified reimbursement payments, and the making of excessive, interest free and un-repaid loans – are precisely the types of abuses that would justify the Internal Revenue Service in stripping the BCS, and each BCS Bowl and possibly even each BCS Conference school (although that is highly unlikely) of their tax exempt status. In the worst-case scenario the BCS could also be subject to forfeiture and seizure proceedings. While the worst penalties are unlikely to be enforced, even the milder penalties, such as a determination of a cartel and trust, would have devastating consequences for the BCS and the current system. The court could also order a resolution of the current unfair competition inherent in the structure of the BCS, including ordering a playoff system and ordering the Bowls to participate as the court directs rather than as the bowls had planned in the case of the BCS's demise. Despite Big 10 Commissioner Delaney's assertion that if the BCS were to fold they would "go back to the old system" if a court ordered a solution such as a playoff the Conferences would have no choice in the matter, and would be required – especially if a determination is made that the BCS is an illegal trust or cartel – to do whatever the court says, including submitting to federal oversight of the Bowl's and Bowl teams' finances and administration, and conducting a 4, 8 or 16 team playoff, or whatever other remedy the court ordered in their holding. The structure, timing and participants in such a system would be completely out of the hands of the individuals and groups who now control those decisions, and those same individuals and groups would, in all likelihood, not be given the choice of not participating. A court ruling could require them to participate just as they are now, but they would be required to do so based on the court's rules rather than the BCS rules. This is one of the main reasons that the BCS is fighting against government intervention so strongly. The Department of Justice inquiry is far and away the most potentially dangerous legal situation that the BCS has faced to date.

== See also ==
- Mythical national championship
- College football national championships in NCAA Division I FBS
