= 2004 Rose Bowl =

American college football game

2004 Rose Bowl presented by Citi
- 90th Rose Bowl Game
Michigan Wolverines	USC Trojans
(10–2)	(11–1)
Big Ten	Pac-10
14	28
Head coach: Lloyd Carr	Head coach: Pete Carroll
AP / Coaches / BCS; 4 / 4 / 4	AP / Coaches / BCS; 1 / 1 / 3
	1	2	3	4	Total
Michigan	0	0	7	7	14
USC	7	7	14	0	28
- Date: January 1, 2004
- Season: 2003
- Stadium: Rose Bowl
- Location: Pasadena, California
- MVP: Matt Leinart (USC QB)
- Favorite: USC by 7
- National anthem: Spirit of Troy
- Referee: Steve Usechek (Big 12)
- Halftime show: Spirit of Troy; Michigan Marching Band
- Attendance: 93,849
- Payout: US$14 million

United States TV coverage
- Network: ABC
- Announcers: Keith Jackson (play-by-play); Dan Fouts (analyst); Todd Harris (sideline)

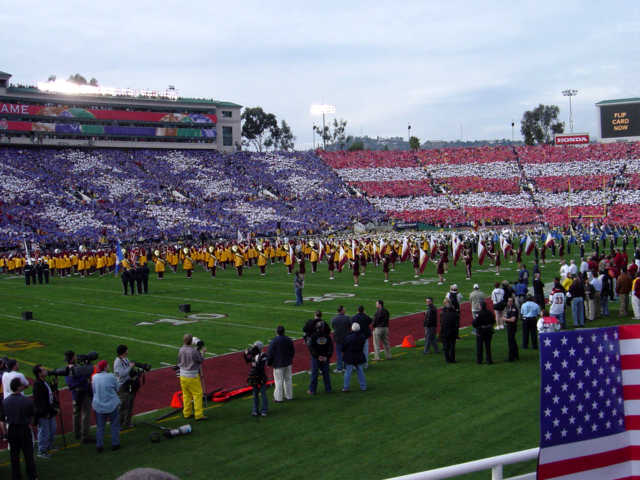
Card stunt being performed by the crowd prior to kickoff

The 2004 Rose Bowl was a college football bowl game held on January 1, 2004 at the Rose Bowl in Pasadena, California. It was the 90th Rose Bowl Game. The USC Trojans, champions of the Pacific-10 Conference, defeated the Michigan Wolverines, champions of the Big Ten Conference, 28-14. USC quarterback Matt Leinart was named the Rose Bowl Player of the Game.

The events leading up to the 2004 Rose Bowl were the subject of controversy. Although USC was ranked #1 in both the AP Poll and the Coaches Poll, the Trojans finished #3 in the final BCS standings due to a weaker schedule and one defeat – to unranked California – during the regular season, and thus did not qualify to go the BCS National Championship Game, and played in the 2004 Sugar Bowl. Meanwhile, the Oklahoma Sooners played a stronger schedule in their undefeated regular season, but lost on December 5, 2003 in the 2003 Big 12 Championship Game to the #8-ranked Kansas State Wildcats. By virtue of their dominance through the entire regular season, Oklahoma remained #1 in the final BCS rankings issued at the outset of the bowl season. Oklahoma would lose, 21-14, to the LSU Tigers, #2 in both polls and the BCS rankings, in the Sugar Bowl game.

== Pre-Game Activities ==
On October 21, 2003 – Tournament of Roses President Michael K. Riffey chose 17-year-old Megan Chinen, a senior at La Salle High School & a resident of Pasadena, California to become the 86th Rose Queen to reign over the 115th Rose Parade and the 90th Rose Bowl Game on New Year's Day.

The game was presided over by the 2004 Tournament of Roses Royal Court and the Rose Parade Grand Marshal John Williams. Members of the court were: Princesses Stephanie Barnes, La Canada Flintridge, La Canada High School; Katherine Koch, Pasadena, John Marshall Fundamental High School; Erinne La Brie, Arcadia, Arcadia High School; Natalie Matsumoto, San Marino, San Marino High School; Christina Mills, Pasadena, La Salle High School; and Lauren Stassel, La Canada Flintridge, Flintridge Sacred Heart Academy.

== Teams ==
=== Michigan Wolverines ===
Michigan opened at home in 2003 winning big over Central Michigan and Houston. A 38-0 shutout of Notre Dame propelled the Wolverines to a #3 ranking, but they lost the next week at Oregon, 31-27. Michigan bounced back to beat Indiana, but then lost another close road game at Iowa, 30-27. Michigan played next on a Friday evening, October 10, at the Hubert H. Humphrey Metrodome in a battle for the Little Brown Jug against Minnesota. Minnesota came into the game ranked #17 and Michigan was ranked #20 in one of the most highly anticipated Michigan-Minnesota matchups in years. Down 21 points at the beginning of the fourth quarter, Michigan put together its greatest comeback in school history to win 38-35. The Wolverines won their next four games over Illinois, #10 Purdue, #9 Michigan State, and Northwestern and rose to #5 in the rankings before their annual showdown with the Ohio State Buckeyes. In front of a record crowd of 112,118 at Michigan Stadium, the Wolverines beat the #4 ranked Buckeyes 35-21 to win the Big Ten championship outright.

=== USC Trojans ===
The Trojans opened the season winning at #6 Auburn, 23-0. Their only loss of the season was a triple overtime loss at Cal, 34-31 on September 27. Later in the season, USC beat Notre Dame 45-14, scoring the most points allowed by the Irish in since 1960, and routed Arizona 45-0 in the first shutout of the Wildcats in 146 games.

== Game summary ==
Former University of Michigan coach Bo Schembechler was in attendance, and remarked, "Didn't watch it", when asked what he thought of the 2003 game and also about the Nebraska-Miami Rose Bowl in 2002. The Trojans wore a "54" sticker to commemorate Drean Rucker, an incoming freshman linebacker who drowned in July 2003. Former USC Trojans safety Troy Polamalu also was in attendance and was on the USC sideline. He was also shown embracing coach Pete Carroll at the game's end.

=== Scoring summary ===
==== First quarter ====
- USC – Keary Colbert, 25-yard pass from Matt Leinart (Ryan Killeen kick)

==== Second quarter ====
- USC – LenDale White, 6-yard pass from Matt Leinart (Ryan Killeen kick)

==== Third quarter ====
- USC – Keary Colbert, 47-yard pass from Matt Leinart (Ryan Killeen kick)
- Michigan – Tim Massaquoi, 5-yard pass from John Navarre (Garrett Rivas kick)
- USC – Matt Leinart, 15-yard pass from Mike Williams (Ryan Killeen kick)

==== Fourth quarter ====
- Michigan – Chris Perry, 2-yard run (Garrett Rivas kick)

== Aftermath ==
LSU defeated Oklahoma 21-14 in the Sugar Bowl. The Coaches Poll chose the winner of that game, the LSU Tigers, as the BCS National Champions. The AP Poll, however, selected the Rose Bowl champion USC Trojans resulting in the first split national title since the 1997–98 season, the year before the creation of the Bowl Championship Series, and the only split title of the BCS era. The BCS ranking formula was immediately reworked and simplified to place greater emphasis on the human polls to avoid a repeat scenario.
