= 2003 Ohio State Buckeyes football team =

American college football season

2003 Ohio State Buckeyes football

Fiesta Bowl champion

Fiesta Bowl, W 35–28 vs. Kansas State
- Conference: Big Ten Conference

Ranking
- Coaches: No. 4
- AP: No. 4
- Record: 11–2 (6–2 Big Ten)
- Head coach: Jim Tressel (3rd season)
- Offensive coordinator: Jim Bollman (3rd season)
- Offensive scheme: Multiple
- Defensive coordinator: Mark Dantonio (3rd season)
- Base defense: 4–3
- Captains: Tim Anderson; Michael Jenkins; Craig Krenzel; Will Smith
- Home stadium: Ohio Stadium

2003 Big Ten Conference football standings
	Conf.			Overall
Team	W		L	W		L
No. 6 Michigan $	7	–	1	10	–	3
No. 4 Ohio State %	6	–	2	11	–	2
No. 18 Purdue	6	–	2	9	–	4
No. 8 Iowa	5	–	3	10	–	3
No. 20 Minnesota	5	–	3	10	–	3
Michigan State	5	–	3	8	–	5
Wisconsin	4	–	4	7	–	6
Northwestern	4	–	4	6	–	7
Penn State	1	–	7	3	–	9
Indiana	1	–	7	2	–	10
Illinois	0	–	8	1	–	11
% – BCS at-large representative; $ – Conference champion; Rankings from AP Poll

The 2003 Ohio State Buckeyes football team was an American football team that represented the Ohio State University as a member of the Big Ten Conference during the 2003 NCAA Division I-A football season. In their third year under head coach Jim Tressel, the Buckeyes compiled an 11–2 record (6–2 in conference games), tied for second place in the Big Ten, and outscored opponents by a total of 322 to 229. Against ranked opponents, the Buckeyes defeated No. 17 Washington, No. 24 NC State, No. 9 Iowa, No. 14 Michigan State, and No. 11 Purdue, and lost to No. 23 Wisconsin and No. 5 Michigan. They concluded the season with a 35–28 victory over No. 8 Kansas State in the 2004 Fiesta Bowl. The Buckeyes were ranked No. 4 in the final AP and Coaches polls.

The Buckeyes gained an average of 126.1 rushing yards and 206.1 passing yards per game. On defense, they gave up 62.3 rushing yards and 234.5 passing yards per game. The team's statistical leaders included quarterback Craig Krenzel (2,040 passing yards, 55.0% completion percentage), running back Lydell Ross (826 rushing yards, 4.3 yards per carry), wide receiver Michael Jenkins (55 receptions for 834 yards), and kicker Mike Nugent (86 points scored, 38 of 38 extra points, 16 of 19 field goals). Defensive back Will Allen was a consensus first-team All-American. Defensive end Will Smith also received first-team honors from multiple selectors, including the American Football Coaches Association. Punter B. J. Sander won the Ray Guy Award. Eight Ohio State players received first-team honors on the 2003 All-Big Ten Conference football team: Smith; Allen; Sander; guard Alex Stepanovich; tight end Ben Hartsock; defensive tackle Tim Anderson; linebacker A. J. Hawk; and defensive back Chris Gamble.

The team played its home games at Ohio Stadium in Columbus, Ohio.

== Schedule ==
Date	Time	Opponent	Rank	Site	TV	Result	Attendance
August 30	8:00 p.m.	No. 17 Washington*	No. 2	Ohio Stadium; Columbus, OH (College GameDay)	ABC	W 28–9	105,078
September 6	12:00 p.m.	San Diego State*	No. 2	Ohio Stadium; Columbus, OH	ESPN Plus	W 16–13	104,433
September 13	12:00 p.m.	No. 24 NC State*	No. 3	Ohio Stadium; Columbus, OH	ABC	W 44–38 ^{3OT}	104,890
September 20	12:00 p.m.	Bowling Green*	No. 5	Ohio Stadium; Columbus, OH	ESPN Plus	W 24–17	104,358
September 27	12:00 p.m.	Northwestern	No. 4	Ohio Stadium; Columbus, OH	ESPN2	W 20–0	104,680
October 11	9:00 p.m.	at No. 23 Wisconsin	No. 3	Camp Randall Stadium; Madison, WI	ESPN	L 10–17	79,793
October 18	3:30 p.m.	No. 9 Iowa	No. 8	Ohio Stadium; Columbus, OH	ABC	W 19–10	105,044
October 25	12:00 p.m.	at Indiana	No. 8	Memorial Stadium; Bloomington, IN	ESPN	W 35–6	51,240
November 1	3:30 p.m.	at Penn State	No. 8	Beaver Stadium; University Park, PA (rivalry)	ABC	W 21–20	108,276
November 8	12:00 p.m.	No. 14 Michigan State	No. 7	Ohio Stadium; Columbus, OH	ABC	W 33–23	105,194
November 15	3:30 p.m.	No. 11 Purdue	No. 4	Ohio Stadium; Columbus, OH (College GameDay)	ABC	W 16–13 ^{OT}	105,286
November 22	12:00 p.m.	at No. 5 Michigan	No. 4	Michigan Stadium; Ann Arbor, MI (rivalry, College GameDay)	ABC	L 21–35	112,118
January 2, 2004	8:15 p.m.	vs. No. 8 Kansas State*	No. 7	Sun Devil Stadium; Tempe, AZ (Fiesta Bowl)	ABC	W 35–28	73,425
*Non-conference game; Rankings from AP Poll released prior to the game; All times are in Eastern time

== Rankings ==
Ranking movements Legend: ██ Increase in ranking ██ Decrease in ranking ( ) = First-place votes
	Week																
Poll	Pre	1	2	3	4	5	6	7	8	9	10	11	12	13	14	15	Final
AP	2 (27)	2 (25)	3 (8)	5 (6)	4 (5)	3 (5)	3	8	8	8	7	4	4	8	8	7	4
Coaches	2 (28)	2 (26)	3 (13)	4 (7)	4 (5)	3 (5)	3 (6)	8	8	7	6	4	4	7	7	6	4
BCS	Not released								6	6	5	3	2	5	5	5	Not released

== Game summaries ==
=== Washington ===
Team	1	2	3	4	Total
Washington	0	0	3	6	9
• Ohio State	14	7	7	0	28

- Date: August 30
- Location: Ohio Stadium, Columbus, OH
- Game start: 8:00 p.m. EST
- TV announcers (ABC): Keith Jackson (Play-by-play), Dan Fouts (Color) & Todd Harris (Sideline)

Scoring summary
1	8:31	OSU	Maurice Hall 2-yard run (Mike Nugent kick)	OSU 7–0
1	2:51	OSU	Craig Krenzel 23-yard run (Mike Nugent kick)	OSU 14–0
2	0:11	OSU	Craig Krenzel 11-yard run (Mike Nugent kick)	OSU 21–0
3	13:22	WASH	Evan Knudson 46-yard field goal	OSU 21–3
3	6:06	OSU	Lydell Ross 15-yard run (Mike Nugent kick)	OSU 28–3
4	3:27	WASH	Cody Pickett 2-yard run (run failed)	OSU 28–9

The 2003 season opened to excitement and to disappointment. Reports surfaced during the preseason that led to star RB Maurice Clarett being suspended indefinitely, and he was the center of attention as ESPN's College Gameday came to Columbus. A top 20 battle was set to be waged between the #17/19 Washington Huskies and the #2 ranked defending National Champion Ohio State Buckeyes. Ohio State came in 5–0 in night games in Ohio Stadium; meanwhile Washington was welcoming a new head coach, Keith Gilberston, who was replacing the fired Rick Neuheisel.

The Huskies featured such stars as QB "Cowboy" Cody Pickett, 1st round draft pick Reggie Williams, offensive tackle Khaliff Barnes, and TE Joe Toledo (who would go on to the NFL as an OT). On the defensive side Greg Carothers and Roc Alexander were the significant names, but they would fail against the Ohio State offense.

Maurice Hall scored at the 8:31 mark in the first Quarter to take a 7–0 lead. They built on that lead with a magnificent 28-yard scramble by Craig Krenzel with 2:51 left in the 1st. Ohio state would take a 21–0 lead into halftime, when Craig Krenzel again scrambled 11 yards for a score with 22 seconds remaining.

Washington came out with some renewed vigor to start the 3rd, but only came away with a field goal by Evan Knudson, making it 21–3, with 13:22 left to go in the 3rd. Ohio State wouldn't slow down however, and junior tailback Lydell Ross scored off a bruising 15-yard run to make it 28–3. Cody Pickett closed out the scoring by rolling out for a 2-yard run, but failing on the 2 point try. The final score was 28–9, and Ohio State was 1–0, and on a fifteen-game winning streak.

=== San Diego State ===
Week 2 brought the Aztecs to Columbus. The two teams had met in head coach Jim Tressel's first season at Ohio State in 2001, a 27–12 victory. This time however, San Diego State's QB Matt Dlugolecki was determined to change the outcome, and got the Aztecs rolling with an 11-yard touchdown pass to start the attack. The #2 ranked Buckeyes managed to add a field goal to make it 7–3 at the 9:54 mark. The Aztecs were again marching until OSU cornerback Chris Gamble tipped a pass to safety Will Allen, who went 100 yards coast-to-coast in doing so, set the Ohio Stadium record for an interception return, and gave OSU a 10–7 lead. Another Mike Nugent field goal made it 13–7, it would stay that way on to half time.

Ohio State's opponent came out with new life after half time, and the Aztecs added a field goal early in the 3rd to make it 13–10 Buckeyes. The OSU offense was unproductive in this game, not even registering an offensive touchdown, but were able to tack on another Mike Nugent field goal in the 4th, to take a 16–10 advantage. San Diego State remained competitive, making it 16–13, but with junior RB Maurice Hall´s 19 carries for 91 yards OSU ran down the clock, and held on for their 16th straight win.

=== NC State ===
North Carolina State at Ohio State

Team	1	2	3	4	OT	2OT	3OT	Total
NC State	0	7	0	17	7	7	0	38
• Ohio State	14	0	3	7	7	7	6	44

- Date: September 13
- Location: Ohio Stadium, Columbus, OH
- Game start: 12:00 p.m. EST
- TV announcers (ABC): Tim Brant (Play-by-play), Ed Cunningham (Color) & Sam Ryan (Sideline)
- Source: ESPN

Scoring summary
1	4:13	Ohio St	Michael Jenkins 44-yard pass from Craig Krenzel (Mike Nugent kick)	Ohio St 7-0
1	2:47	Ohio St	Lydell Ross 2-yard run (Mike Nugent kick)	Ohio St 14-0
2	:18	NC State	Jerricho Cotchery 11-yard pass from Philip Rivers (Adam Kiker kick)	Ohio St 14-7
3	:00	Ohio St	Mike Nugent 22-yard field goal	Ohio St 17-7
4	11:25	Ohio St	Craig Krenzel 6-yard run (Mike Nugent kick)	Ohio St 24-7
4	8:26	NC State	Jerricho Cotchery 9-yard pass from Philip Rivers (Adam Kiker kick)	Ohio St 24-14
4	5:51	NC State	Adam Kiker 24-yard field goal	Ohio St 24-17
4	:21	NC State	T.J. Williams 5-yard pass from Philip Rivers (Adam Kiker kick)	Tie 24-24
OT		Ohio St	Ben Hartsock 10-yard pass from Craig Krenzel (Mike Nugent kick)	Ohio St 31-24
OT		NC State	Tramain Hall 17-yard pass from Philip Rivers (Adam Kiker kick)	Tie 31-31
2OT		NC State	T.A. McLendon 2-yard run (Adam Kiker kick)	NC State 38-31
2OT		Ohio St	Ryan Hamby 2-yard pass from Craig Krenzel (Mike Nugent kick)	Tie 38-38
3OT		Ohio St	Michael Jenkins 7-yard pass from Craig Krenzel (pass failed)	Ohio St 44-38

For the second time in 2003, the second-ranked Buckeyes hosted a Top 25 opponent, welcoming the No. 22/24-ranked North Carolina State Wolfpack and their high-powered offense. Questions surrounded the Ohio State offense heading into the game, as senior quarterback Craig Krenzel had completed just 5 of 20 pass attempts the previous week, with the Buckeyes managing only 196 total yards.

NC State had a loaded team featuring QB Philip Rivers (1st Round NFL Draft Pick), RB T. A. McLendon, WR Jerricho Cotchery (draft pick of the New York Jets), and offensive lineman Sean Locklear (selected by the Seattle Seahawks). On defense, though young, DE Mario Williams and DT John McCargo would both go on to be 1st round draft picks, with Williams going #1 overall. This Ohio State squad was loaded with future NFL stars however, and they were ready to prove they were up to task.

NC State started off struggling for every yard, and Ohio State drew first blood. Michael Jenkins got off to a great start, with a 44-yard touchdown reception off of a shallow drag (he ended up with 7 catches for 124 yards and 2 touchdowns) at the 4:13 mark of the first quarter. On the ensuing kickoff, the NC State returners collided with each other, and the ball bounced off a helmet of the returner. Will Allen (ho would go on to earn All American status after the season) recovered the ball on the 4-yard line, and Lydell Ross punched it in three plays later from two yards out, making it 14–0 with 2:47 left in the first quarter. Though the first quarter, NC State had managed just five yards off 15 plays. NC State finally got their offense untracked thanks to some tough running from the injured McLendon, who was questionable at the start of the game. The drive ended when Jericho Cotchery was wide open on an 11-yard scoring strike from Rivers just before halftime. OSU's lead shrunk to 14–7.

NC State just couldn't quite get it together in the 3rd quarter and much of the reasoning was thanks to Will Smith and the Buckeye's defense constantly harassing Rivers. A Wolfpack turnover led to a 22-yard field goal for OSU in the third quarter. Ohio State appeared to be in complete control after Craig Krenzel scrambled 6 yards for OSU's third touchdown of the day. With 11:26 left in the 4th quarter, the Wolfpack's time seemed to be running out. “The Chest” Chuck Amato (NC State head coach) had other ideas however, as NCSU scored on their next 3 possessions. The first came on a 9-yard touchdown pass from Rivers to Cotchery. Then after A. J. Davis picked off a Krenzel pass, NCSU added a FG to cut it to 24–17 with 5:51 left. The Wolfpack would get the ball back and would complete the comeback with a game-tying 5-yard touchdown pass from Rivers to T.J. Williams with just 21 seconds left to force OT.

It was the first overtime game in Ohio Stadium, and would set the bar impossibly high for any future overtime contests. Ohio State had first possession, and Krenzel hit senior tight-end Ben Hartsock for a 10-yard score. Rivers would match the Buckeyes though, with his own 17-yard touchdown pass. The Wolfpack would start off on offense for the next series, and T. A. McLendon took a toss 2 yards to the end-zone to take a 38–31 lead. Now OSU's turn, freshman tight-end Ryan Hamby's first receiving touchdown in his career brought the Buckeyes even at 38-all. Staying with Ohio State, “Mr. Clutch” Michael Jenkins caught a 7-yard touchdown that was a bullet Krenzel squeezed between 2 NC State defenders to give OSU a 44–38 lead. The mandatory two-point conversion try was a swatted down pass, so now NC State would have a chance to seal the win. The Wolfpack would march up to the 4-yard line, where some curious play calling began.

On first down from the four, Rivers took it up the middle on a QB sneak, and was stuffed for no gain. A second down pass was broken up by junior cornerback Chris Gamble, who just barely missed a game clinching pick. In a peculiar move, Rivers again went for a QB sneak from the same formation as their first down play, only to be stuffed again. It was 4th and game from the 4-yard line. NC State ran the same toss McLendon scored on the previous possession, but a bruising shoulder tackle to the spinning running back placed McClendon firmly on his butt, with the ball a few inches from the goal line. It was as close as you could get, with the referees taking several tense moments to decide whether or not he got in, but once again, Will Allen, as he would do so many times during his Buckeye career, preserved Ohio State's 17th consecutive victory, in what is the longest game in Ohio State history. It took 4 hours and 17 minutes, but after 3 overtime periods, Ohio State 44, North Carolina State 38.

=== Bowling Green ===
A week 4 showdown was set between the #4 ranked Ohio State Buckeyes and the Bowling Green Falcons. Bowling Green had been built up quite a bit by former head coach Urban Meyer, and new head coach Gregg Brandon was looking to keep the team on track. With stars such as QB Josh Harris and center Scott Mruczkowski (both of whom would spend time in the NFL); the Falcons were primed to pick apart the Buckeyes. The game also featured two of the Nation's best kickers in Shaun Suisham (BGSU) and Jr. Mike Nugent (OSU).

Starting QB Craig Krenzel would miss the contest from an elbow injury he suffered against N.C. State, and Sr. Quarterback Scott McMullen of Granville, OH would lead the team for the first time since 2001 (he played mop up duty for the Bucks in 2002). It would be the Buckeyes striking first as Scott McMullen sent a 7-yard strike to Sr. Drew Carter, and the Buckeyes had a 7–0 lead. Josh Harris matched McMullen's touchdown with a 7-yard toss as well. Unfortunately for the Falcons, that would be their only score of the first half.

OSU built up a 17–7 halftime advantage with a 47-yard field goal by Mike Nugent, and added a touchdown after a crushing 33-yard run by Lydell Ross on 4th and 1. Ross and fellow running back Maurice Hall would combine for 201-yards on the day (Hall - 107 yards on 19 carries; Ross - 94 on 22).

Ross scored on a 3-yard run in the 4th, to give the Buckeyes a 24–7 lead, just as they had possessed the week before. And just as the week before, Bowling Green mounted a furious 4th quarter comeback, scoring a touchdown with 3:25 left to go, and a recovering the onsides kick. A field goal at the end of that drive had OSU fans on the edge of their seats. OSU recovered BG's second onsides kick attempt, but failed to run out the clock. It wouldn't be until who-else-but safety Will Allen intercepted Harris's final pass that the fans could relax. Ohio State had scored their 4th win of the season, and 18th straight.

=== Wisconsin ===
October 11, 2003

=== Iowa ===
Team	1	2	3	4	Total
Iowa	3	0	0	7	10
• Ohio State	10	0	7	2	19

- Date: October 18
- Location: Ohio Stadium, Columbus, OH
- Game start: 3:30 p.m. EST
- TV announcers (ABC): Brent Musburger (Play-by-play), Gary Danielson (Color) & Jack Arute (Sideline)

Scoring summary
1	9:56	OHST	Mike Nugent 53 yard field goal	OHST 3–0
1	9:22	OHST	Michael Jenkins 54 yard punt return (Mike Nugent kick)	OHST 10–0
1	2:45	IOWA	Nate Kaeding 36 yard field goal	OHST 10–3
3	7:54	OHST	Donte Whitner recovered blocked punt in end zone (Mike Nugent kick)	OHST 17–3
4	14:09	IOWA	Nate Kaeding 5 yard run (Nate Kaeding kick)	OHST 17–10
4	3:03	OHST	Safety	OHST 19–10

=== Purdue ===
Purdue Boilermakers (8–2) at Ohio State Buckeyes (9–1)

Quarter	1	2	3	4	OT	Total
Purdue	3	3	0	7	0	13
Ohio St	0	6	0	7	3	16

at Ohio Stadium • Columbus, Ohio

- Date: November 15
- Game time: 3:30 p.m. EST
- Game weather: Cloudy • 43 °F (6 °C) • Wind 5 S/SE
- Game attendance: 105,286
- Referee: Dennis Lipski
- TV announcers (ABC): Brad Nessler, Bob Griese, and Lynn Swann

Game information

Purdue

- Kyle Orton
  27/47, 249 Yds
- Jerod Void
  22 Rush, 60 Yds, TD
- Taylor Stubblefield
  8 Rec, 78 Yds

Ohio St

- Craig Krenzel
  15/29, 226 Yds
- Lydell Ross
  23 Rush, 79 Yds
- Michael Jenkins
  6 Rec, 123 Yds

Scoring summary

Quarter	Time	Drive			Team	Scoring information	Score	
Quarter	Time	Plays	Yards	TOP	Team	Scoring information	PUR	OSU
1	7:29	12	53	5:49	Purdue	45-yard field goal by Ben Jones	3	0
2	14:50	10	79	4:27	Ohio St	26-yard field goal by Mike Nugent	3	3
2	13:01	5	19	1:41	Purdue	47-yard field goal by Ben Jones	6	3
2	2:42	5	2	1:19	Ohio St	52-yard field goal by Mike Nugent	6	6
4	11:23				Ohio St	Fumble recovery in end zone for touchdown by Mike Kudla, Mike Nugent kick good	6	13
4	4:36	8	92	2:12	Purdue	Jerod Void 11-yard touchdown run, Ben Jones kick good	13	13
OT		4	6		Ohio St	36-yard field goal by Mike Nugent	13	16
"TOP" = time of possession. For other American football terms, see Glossary of American football.							13	16

=== Michigan ===
Ohio State Buckeyes (10–1) at Michigan Wolverines (9–2)

Quarter	1	2	3	4	Total
Ohio St	0	7	7	7	21
Michigan	7	14	7	7	35

at Michigan Stadium • Ann Arbor, Michigan

- Date: November 22
- Game time: 12:00 p.m. EDT
- Game weather: Mostly cloudy • low 50s • Wind 10–20 E/NE
- Game attendance: 112,118
- Referee: Jim Lapetina
- TV announcers (ABC): Keith Jackson, Dan Fouts, and Todd Harris

Game information

Ohio St

- Craig Krenzel
  20/33, 221 Yds, 2 TD
- Lydell Ross
  9 Rush, 22 Yds, TD
- Michael Jenkins
  9 Rec, 132 Yds

Michigan

- John Navarre
  21/32, 278 Yds, 2 TD, INT
- Chris Perry
  31 Rush, 154 Yds, 2 TD
- Braylon Edwards
  7 Rec, 130 Yds, 2 TD

100th meeting

Scoring summary

Quarter	Time	Drive			Team	Scoring information	Score	
Quarter	Time	Plays	Yards	TOP	Team	Scoring information	OSU	MICH
1	0:39	18	89	7:04	Michigan	Steve Breaston 1-yard touchdown run, Garrett Rivas kick good	0	7
2	13:33	3	74	0:47	Michigan	Braylon Edwards 64-yard touchdown reception from John Navarre, Rivas kick good	0	14
2	5:49	10	80	3:49	Michigan	Braylon Edwards 23-yard touchdown reception from John Navarre, Garrett Rivas kick good	0	21
2	0:44	12	81	5:05	Ohio St	Santonio Holmes 8-yard touchdown reception from Craig Krenzel, Mike Nugent kick good	7	21
3	13:04	5	62	1:56	Michigan	Chris Perry 30-yard touchdown run, Garrett Rivas kick good	7	28
3	6:55	4	43	1:03	Ohio St	Santonio Holmes 13-yard touchdown reception from Craig Krenzel, Mike Nugent kick good	14	28
4	13:53	11	93	2:59	Ohio St	Lydell Ross 2-yard touchdown run, Mike Nugent kick good	21	28
4	7:55	8	88	3:53	Michigan	Chris Perry 15-yard touchdown run, Garrett Rivas kick good	21	35
"TOP" = time of possession. For other American football terms, see Glossary of American football.							21	35

=== Kansas State—Fiesta Bowl ===
Team	1	2	3	4	Total
Kansas State	0	7	7	14	28
• Ohio State	14	7	14	0	35

- Date: January 2
- Location: Sun Devil Stadium, Tempe, AZ
- Game start: 8:00 p.m. EST
- Television network: ABC

Scoring summary
1	6:41	OSU	John Hollins 7-yard blocked punt return (Mike Nugent kick)	OSU 7–0
1	2:49	OSU	Santonio Holmes 6-yard pass from Craig Krenzel (Mike Nugent kick)	OSU 14–0
2	6:49	OSU	Mike Jenkins 17-yard pass from Craig Krenzel (Mike Nugent kick)	OSU 21–0
2	3:01	KSU	Darren Sproles 6-yard run (Joe Rheem kick)	OSU 21–7
3	8:59	KSU	Ell Roberson 14-yard run (Joe Rheem kick)	OSU 21–14
3	4:53	OSU	Michael Jenkins 8-yard pass from Craig Krenzel (Mike Nugent kick)	OSU 28–14
3	0:37	OSU	Santonio Holmes 31-yard pass from Craig Krenzel (Mike Nugent kick)	OSU 35–14
4	13:25	KSU	Ayo Saba 3-yard run (Joe Rheem kick)	OSU 35–21
4	2:47	KSU	Ell Roberson 1-yard run (Joe Rheem kick)	OSU 35–28

== Personnel ==
=== Coaching staff ===
- Jim Tressel – Head coach (3rd year)
- Jim Bollman – Offensive line / offensive coordinator (3rd year)
- Bill Conley – Tight ends / recruiting coordinator (17th year)
- Joe Daniels – Quarterbacks (3rd year)
- Mark Dantonio – Defensive coordinator (3rd year)
- Luke Fickell – Special teams (3rd year)
- Jim Heacock – Defensive line (8th year)
- Mark Snyder – Defensive linebackers (3rd year)
- Tim Spencer – Running backs (10th year)
- Mel Tucker – Defensive backs (3rd year)
- Bob Tucker – Director of football operations (9th year)
- Dick Tressel – Associate Director of football operations (3rd year)

=== Roster ===
2003 Ohio State Buckeyes football team roster
Players
Coaches
Offense

Pos.	#	Name	Class
OL	74	Kirk Barton	Fr
WR	8	Drew Carter	Sr
WR	3	Bam Childress	Jr
RB	13	Maurice Clarett	So
OT	50	Doug Datish	Fr
WR	7	Chris Gamble	Jr
WR/DB	11	Anthony Gonzalez	Fr
WR	82	Roy Hall	Fr
TE	88	Ben Hartsock	Sr
WR	17	Santonio Holmes	Fr
WR	12	Michael Jenkins	Sr
QB	16	Craig Krenzel	Sr
WR	86	Maurice Lee	Sr
C	55	Nick Mangold	So
QB	15	Scott McMullen	Sr
RB	30	Lydell Ross	Jr
OT	77	Rob Sims	So
QB	10	Troy Smith	Fr
C	76	Alex Stepanovich	Sr
QB	2	Justin Zwick	Fr

Defense

Pos.	#	Name	Class
S	4	Will Allen	Jr
DT	54	Tim Anderson	Sr
LB	42	Bobby Carpenter	So
SS	37	Tyler Everett	So
CB	37	Dustin Fox	Jr
DE	76	Simon Fraser	Jr
DT	94	Marcus Green	So
DB	34	Rob Harley	Jr
LB	47	A. J. Hawk	So
FS	32	Brandon Mitchell	Fr
DL	97	David Patterson	Fr
DL	90	Quinn Pitcock	Fr
LB	44	Robert Reynolds	Sr
DE	99	Jay Richardson	Sr
FS	99	Nate Salley	So
LB	51	Anthony Schlegel	Jr
DE	56	Darrion Scott	Sr
DB	14	Antonio Smith	Fr
DE	93	Will Smith	Sr
CB	2	E.J. Underwood	So
SS	9	Donte Whitner	Fr
CB	26	Ashton Youboty	Fr

Special teams

Pos.	#	Name	Class
PK	23	Josh Huston	Jr
PK	85	Mike Nugent	Jr
P	21	B.J. Sander	Sr

Head coach

- Jim Tressel

Coordinators/assistant coaches

Legend

- (C) Team captain
- (S) Suspended
- (I) Ineligible
- Injured
- Redshirt

Roster

=== Depth chart ===
Defense

FS
21 Nate Salley
6 Tyler Everett

WLB	Middle LB	SLB
47 A. J. Hawk	44 Robert Reynolds	42 Bobby Carpenter
41 Thomas Matthews	46 Fred Pagac Jr.	⋅

SS
4 Will Allen
9 Donte Whitner

CB
7 Chris Gamble
2 E. J. Underwood

DE	DT	DT	DE
93 Will Smith	54 Tim Anderson	56 Darrion Scott	75 Simon Fraser
57 Mike Kudla	94 Marcus Green	90 Quinn Pitcock	99 Jay Richardson

CB
37 Dustin Fox
26 Ashton Youboty

Offense

SE
12 Michael Jenkins
8 Drew Carter

LT	LG	C	RG	RT
77 Rob Sims	63 Adrien Clarke	55 Nick Mangold	76 Alex Stepanovich	71 Shane Olivea
53 Ivan Douglass	64 Adam Olds	⋅	79 Bryce Bishop	52 Mike Kne

TE
88 Ben Hartsock
80 Ryan Hamby

FL
4 Santonio Holmes
3 Bam Childress

QB
16 Craig Krenzel
15 Scott McMullen

Key reserves
32 Brandon Mitchell (S)

FB
38 Brandon Joe
3 Ira Guilford

Special teams
PK 85 Mike Nugent
P 21 B. J. Sander
KR Maurice Hall Chris Gamble
PR Michael Jenkins Chris Gamble

RB
30 Lydell Ross
28 Maurice Hall

Source: Athletic Department official site, 2002 football archive 12-10-02 depth chart

== 2004 NFL draftees ==
Player	Round	Pick	Position	NFL club
Will Smith	1	18	Defensive end	New Orleans Saints
Chris Gamble	1	28	Defensive back	Carolina Panthers
Michael Jenkins	1	29	Wide receiver	Atlanta Falcons
Ben Hartsock	3	68	Tight end	Indianapolis Colts
Tim Anderson	3	74	Defensive tackle	Buffalo Bills
B. J. Sander	3	87	Punter	Green Bay Packers
Darrion Scott	3	88	Defensive end	Minnesota Vikings
Alex Stepanovich	4	100	Center	Arizona Cardinals
Will Allen	4	111	Defensive back	Tampa Bay Buccaneers
Craig Krenzel	5	148	Quarterback	Chicago Bears
Drew Carter	5	163	Wide receiver	Carolina Panthers
Robert Reynolds	5	165	Linebacker	Tennessee Titans
Shane Olivea	7	209	Tackle	San Diego Chargers
Adrien Clarke	7	227	Guard	Philadelphia Eagles
