= Bowl Championship Series =

American college football playoff series

- BCS logo (2010–2013)
- In operation: 1998–2013
- Preceded by: Various contemporary and retroactive selectors (1869–1935); National polls (1936–1991); Bowl Coalition (1992–1994); Bowl Alliance (1995–1997)
- Succeeded by: College Football Playoff and New Year's Six (2014–present)
- Number of BCS games: 5 per season (4 from 1998 to 2006)
- Championship trophy: AFCA National Championship Trophy
- Television partner(s): ABC (1999–2006); Fox (2006–2009); ESPN (2009–2014)
- Most BCS appearances: Ohio State (10)
- Most BCS wins: Ohio State and USC (6)
- Most BCS championships: Alabama (3)
- Conference with most appearances: Big Ten (28)
- Conference with most game wins: SEC (17)
- Conference with most championships: SEC (9)
- Last championship game: 2014 BCS National Championship Game
- Executive director: Bill Hancock

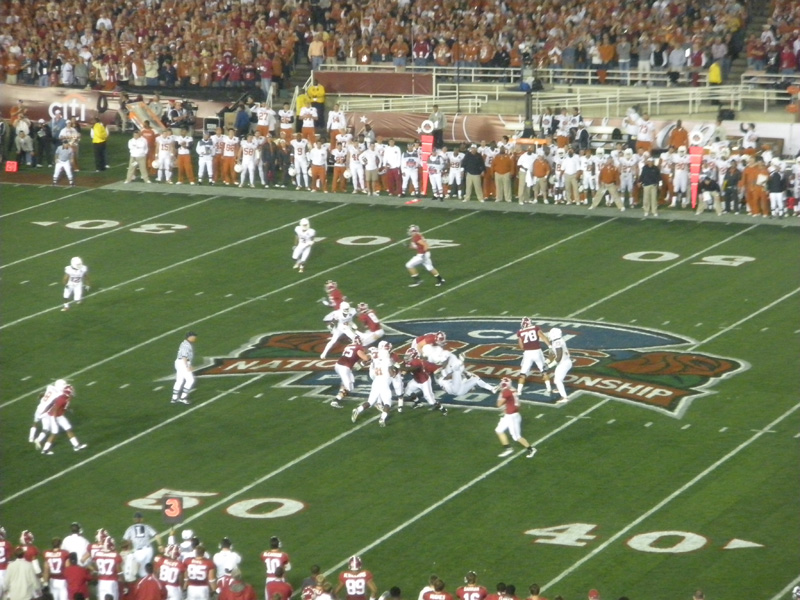
BCS Championship game at the Rose Bowl, Pasadena, California, January 7, 2010, Alabama vs. Texas

The Bowl Championship Series (BCS) was a college football post-season selection system that created four or five bowl game match-ups involving eight or ten of the top ranked teams in the NCAA Division I Football Bowl Subdivision (FBS) of American college football, including an opportunity for the top two teams to compete in a national championship game. The system was in place from the 1998 season to the 2013 season and was replaced in 2014 by the College Football Playoff (CFP).

The BCS relied on a combination of polls and computer selection methods to determine relative team rankings, and to narrow the field to two teams to play in the BCS National Championship Game, held after the other college bowl games (the game rotated among four existing bowl games from the 1998 to 2005 season, and was a separate game from the 2006 to 2013 seasons). The American Football Coaches Association (AFCA) was contractually bound to vote the winner of this game as the BCS National Champion and the contract signed by each conference required them to recognize the winner of the BCS National Championship game as the official and only champion. The BCS was created to end split championships and for the champion to win the title on the field between the two teams selected by the BCS.

The system also selected match-ups for four other prestigious BCS bowl games: the Rose Bowl Game, Fiesta Bowl, Sugar Bowl and Orange Bowl. The ten teams selected included the conference champion from each of the six Automatic Qualifying (AQ) conferences plus four others (two others prior to the 2006 season). The BCS was created by formal agreement by those six conferences (the Atlantic Coast Conference (ACC); Big East, now the American Conference (The American); Big Ten Conference (Big Ten); Big 12 Conference (Big 12); Pac-10, now the Pac-12 Conference (Pac-12); Southeastern Conference (SEC) conferences); and the three FBS independent schools, and evolved to allow other conferences to participate to a lesser degree. For the 1998 through 2005 seasons, eight teams competed in four BCS bowls.

It had been in place since the 1998 season. The BCS replaced the Bowl Alliance, in place from 1995 to 1997, which had followed the Bowl Coalition, in place from 1992 to 1994. Prior to the Bowl Coalition's creation in 1992, the AP poll's number one and two teams had met in a bowl game only 8 times in 56 seasons. The AP's top two teams met 13 out of the 16 seasons when the BCS was in place.

In the 2014 season, the BCS was discontinued and replaced by the CFP, which initially organized a four-team playoff and national championship game. Ten years later, the playoff expanded to 12 teams.

== History leading to the creation and dissolution of the BCS ==
The NCAA Division I Football Bowl Subdivision (FBS) is the only NCAA-sponsored sport without an officially organized NCAA tournament to determine its champion. Instead, the postseason has historically consisted of individual bowl games.

The bowl system began in 1902 with the first ever East–West game in Pasadena, California, held at Tournament Park on New Year's Day in conjunction with the Tournament of Roses parade. This game was an exhibition game pitting a highly rated team from the west coast against a team from east of the Mississippi River. This was an ideal time for a postseason game, as fans could take off work or school during this holiday period to travel to the game. In the first game, the University of Michigan Wolverines represented the east and easily defeated the west's representative Stanford by a score of 49–0. Due to the lopsided victory the game did not resume until 1916.

The game was renamed the Rose Bowl in the 1920s when play shifted to the Rose Bowl stadium, built by the city of Pasadena in conjunction with the Pasadena Tournament of Roses Association. By the 1930s, the Cotton Bowl Classic in Dallas, Texas, Orange Bowl in Miami, Florida, and the Sugar Bowl in New Orleans, Louisiana were also held on January 1 to showcase teams from other regions of the country.

By the 1940s, college football conferences began signing contracts that tied their championship team to a particular bowl. In 1947, the Big Ten Conference and the Pacific Coast Conference, a forerunner of today's Pac-12 Conference, agreed to commit their champions to play in the Rose Bowl every year, an agreement that continued under the BCS. This system raised the possibility that the two top-ranked teams in the final poll would not play each other in a bowl game, even in situations when there was a clear-cut top two. Indeed, since the AP began releasing its final poll after the bowl games in 1968, the two top-ranked teams in the final regular-season AP poll had only played each other in a bowl six times until special bowl arrangements began in 1992. Under these circumstances, it was not uncommon to have the Coaches Poll crown a different national champion than the AP poll, resulting in a split championship. This situation arose a total of ten different seasons before BCS was formed (1954, 1957, 1965, 1970, 1973, 1974, 1978, 1990, 1991, 1997).

For example, in 1991, the University of Miami Hurricanes and the University of Washington Huskies both finished the regular season undefeated and were considered the strongest teams in the nation. Since the Huskies were locked into the Rose Bowl as the Pac-10 Conference champion against Big Ten champion Michigan, they could not play Big East member Miami, who played in the Orange Bowl. Both teams won their bowl games convincingly and shared the national championship, Miami winning the Associated Press poll and Washington earning the top spot in the Coaches Poll. A split national championship has happened on several occasions since then as well (1997, 2003). (See: NCAA Division I FBS National Football Championship for a compilation of past "national champions" since 1869.)

Other teams have won the national championship despite playing presumably weaker schedules than other championship contenders. The BYU Cougars ended the 1984 season as the only undefeated and untied team in the nation, and the nine-time defending champions of the Western Athletic Conference. The Cougars opened the season with a 20–14 victory over No. 3 Pittsburgh, and won the Holiday Bowl against a 6–5 Michigan team that had been ranked as high as No. 2 that season. As the No. 4 ranked team at the end of the regular season, Washington was offered a slot against BYU in the Holiday Bowl; Washington declined, preferring instead to play in the more lucrative Orange Bowl where they beat No. 2 Oklahoma to complete a Pac-10 sweep of New Year's Day bowls (with USC winning the Rose Bowl and UCLA winning the Fiesta Bowl). Washington (11–1) was voted No. 2 following the bowl season with their only blemish a late season loss at Pac-10 champion USC. Coupled with winning its last 11 games in 1983, BYU finished the 1984 season with a 24-game winning streak. Several coaches and reporters claimed that BYU had not played a legitimate schedule and should not be recognized as national champion. Not only was Pittsburgh the only ranked team the Cougars faced all season, but at the time BYU played in the mid-major WAC. Nonetheless, BYU was a near-unanimous choice as national champion in final polls.

To address these problems, five conferences, six bowl games, and leading independent Notre Dame joined forces to create the Bowl Coalition, which was intended to force a de facto "national championship game" between the top two eligible teams in the rankings. By entirely excluding all the other conferences, the Bowl Coalition also made it impossible for a non-Bowl Coalition team to win a national championship. This system was in place from the 1992 season through the 1994 season. While traditional tie-ins between conferences and bowls remained, a team would be released to play in another bowl if it was necessary to force a championship game.

However, this system did not include the Big Ten and Pac-10 champions, as both were obligated to play in the Rose Bowl. The Coalition made several attempts to get the Tournament of Roses Association, which operates the Rose Bowl, to release the Big Ten and Pac-10 champions if necessary to force a championship game. However, those negotiations came to nothing, in part because the Tournament of Roses Association feared jeopardizing its long-standing contract with ABC if one or both teams were needed to force a title game. In 1994—the last year of the Bowl Coalition—undefeated Penn State, from the Big Ten, played Oregon in the Rose Bowl while undefeated Nebraska played Miami in the Orange Bowl. In a system that paired top-ranked teams, Penn State would have played Nebraska for the national championship.

The Bowl Coalition was restructured into the Bowl Alliance for the 1995 season, involving five conferences (reduced to four for the 1996 season) and three bowls (Fiesta, Sugar, and Orange). The championship game rotated among these three bowls. It still did not, however, include the Pac-10 or Big Ten champions, the Rose Bowl, or any non-Bowl Alliance teams.

After a protracted round of negotiations, the Bowl Alliance was reformed into the Bowl Championship Series for the 1998 season; former Southeastern Conference commissioner Roy Kramer is considered to be the "father" of the BCS. The Tournament of Roses Association agreed to release the Big Ten and Pac-10 champions if it was necessary to force a national championship game. In return, the Rose Bowl was added to the yearly national championship rotation, and the game was able to keep its coveted exclusive TV time slot on the afternoon of New Year's Day. However, beginning with the 2006 season, the BCS National Championship Game became a separate event played at the same site as a host bowl a week following New Year's Day.

The new Bowl Championship Series not only included the Big Ten and the Pac-10 conferences but also teams from mid-major conferences, based on performance. No mid-major team, however, or team from any conference outside of the six aligned conferences (with the exception of independent Notre Dame, who played Alabama for the 2012 title), ever played in the BCS Championship Game, causing increasing controversy. This controversy had become even more intense in light of the 4–1 record that mid-major teams had against teams from the six automatic qualifying conferences in the BCS Bowl games they had been allowed to play in. The performances and perfect record of Texas Christian in the 2010 season and Boise State in the season prior to that also fueled the controversy surrounding the perceived inequalities that the BCS seemed to perpetuate. However, little headway was made to institute an alternative system, given the entrenched vested economic interests in the various bowls, until after the 2011 season, which saw LSU and Alabama—both members of the SEC West division—play each other in the 2012 BCS Championship game, where Alabama defeated LSU in a shutout win.

Thereafter, acknowledging the many game, polling, and other related controversies, fans' complaints, and declining game viewership, among other factors, the major conferences decided to institute the College Football Playoff, which began in the 2014 regular season. As a legal entity, the holding company "BCS Properties, LLC" continues to control the College Football Playoff.

== Succession by College Football Playoff ==
The College Football Playoff replaced the BCS as the system used to determine the FBS college football champion beginning in the 2014 season. The four-team playoffs consist of two semifinal games, with the winners advancing to the College Football Championship Game. The game is hosted by a different city each year, with locations selected by bids, akin to the Super Bowl or the Final Four. AT&T Stadium hosted the first title game in 2015. The system is contracted to be in place through at least the 2023–2024 season per a contract with ESPN, which owns the rights to broadcast all games. Unlike the BCS, the system does not use polls or computer rankings to select participants. A 13-member committee chooses and seeds the teams for the two playoff games and four other top-tier bowl games, using a balloting procedure similar to the NCAA basketball tournament selection process.

== Bowl games ==
Locations of the BCS Bowl games

In the BCS format, four regular bowl games and the National Championship Game were considered "BCS bowl games." The four bowl games were the Rose Bowl Game in Pasadena, California, the Sugar Bowl in New Orleans, the Fiesta Bowl in Glendale, Arizona, and the Orange Bowl in Miami Gardens, Florida.

In the first eight seasons of the BCS contract, the championship game was rotated among the four bowls, with each bowl game hosting the national championship once every four years. Starting with the 2007 BCS, the National Championship Games became a separate game played on January 8 at the site of the BCS bowl game that served as the final game on January 1, or January 2 if January 1 was a Sunday.

The University of Oklahoma and Ohio State University are the only schools to appear in all five BCS Bowls. Oklahoma played in the 2007, 2008, and 2011 Fiesta Bowl, the 2004 (national championship) and 2014 Sugar Bowl, the 2001 and 2005 Orange Bowl (both of which were national championships), the 2003 Rose Bowl, and the 2009 BCS National Championship Game. Oklahoma's record was 4–5 with a 1–3 record in National Title games. Ohio State played in the 2003 (national championship), 2004, 2006, and 2009 Fiesta Bowl, the 1999 and 2011 Sugar Bowl*, the 2014 Orange Bowl, the 2010 Rose Bowl, and the 2007 and 2008 BCS National Championship Game. Ohio State's record was 6*-4, with a 1–2 record in National Title Games. The University of Miami appeared in every BCS bowl except for the standalone National Championship Game, although Miami did appear in the national championship when that designation was assigned to the original four bowls in rotation. Miami played in the 2001 Sugar Bowl, 2002 Rose Bowl (national championship), 2003 Fiesta Bowl (national championship), and 2004 Orange Bowl.

^{*} Ohio State won the 2011 Sugar Bowl, but vacated their appearance and victory due to NCAA penalties and sanctions for impermissible acceptance of monetary gifts.

=== Television ===
Initially, ABC held the rights to all four original BCS games, picking up the Fiesta and Orange Bowls from their former homes at CBS, and continuing their lengthy relationships with the Rose and Sugar Bowls. This relationship continued through the bowl games of January 2006.

From the 2006–07 season through the 2009–10 season, Fox Sports held the rights to the BCS games with the exception of the Rose Bowl, as the Tournament of Roses Association elected to continue its association with ABC. Under the terms of the contract, Fox aired three of the four BCS National Championship Games that were played during the time. The only exception was the 2010 contest, which aired on ABC as per its contracts with the Rose Bowl and Tournament of Roses Association.

After the January 2010 bowl games, the contract to air the BCS moved exclusively to ESPN. The network carried the BCS until its dissolution following the 2013–14 season; after that, the four former BCS bowls became part of the College Football Playoff, while ESPN retained their coverage of the contests.

=== Selection of teams ===
A set of rules was used to determine which teams competed in the BCS bowl games.

Certain teams were given automatic berths depending on their BCS ranking and conference, as follows:

- No more than two teams from any one conference could receive berths in BCS games, unless two non-champions from an AQ conference finished as the top two teams in the final BCS standings, in which case they met in the National Title Game while their conference champion played in their conference's BCS bowl game.
- The top two teams were given automatic berths in the BCS National Championship Game.
- The champion of an AQ Conference (ACC, Big 12, Big East/The American, Big Ten, Pac-10/Pac-12, and SEC) was guaranteed an automatic BCS bowl bid.
- Due to the "Notre Dame rule", independent Notre Dame received an automatic berth if it finished in the top eight. Other independents were not covered under this rule.
- From the 1999 season onwards, the highest ranked non-champion in an AQ conference received an automatic berth, provided it was ranked in the top 4 and its conference did not already receive two automatic berths from the above rules. If the highest ranked non-champion was in the top 2 and thus played in the championship game, this provision extended to the highest ranked non-champion outside the top 2.
- From the 2006 season onwards, the highest-ranked champion of a non-AQ conference (Big West, C-USA, MAC, Mountain West, Sun Belt, and WAC) received an automatic berth if:
  - It was ranked in the top 12, or
  - It was ranked in the top 16 and higher than at least one AQ conference champion.

After the automatic berths were granted, the remaining berths, known as "at-large" berths, were filled from a pool of FBS teams who were ranked in the top 14 and had at least nine wins. The actual teams chosen for the at-large berths were determined by the individual bowl committees. Teams from both AQ and non-AQ conferences were eligible for at-large berths.

If there were not enough teams eligible for at-large selection to fill the BCS bowl games, then the remaining at-large teams would have been any FBS teams that were bowl-eligible, had won at least nine regular-season games, and were among the top 18 teams in the final BCS standings. If there were still not enough teams, the pool for potential at-larges continued to increase by four teams until enough teams were available.

All AQ conferences except the Big East/The American had contracts for their champions to participate in specific BCS bowl games. Unless their champion was involved in the BCS National Championship game, the conference tie-ins were:

- Rose Bowl – Big Ten champion and Pac-10/Pac-12 champion
- Fiesta Bowl – Big 12 champion
- Orange Bowl – ACC champion
- Sugar Bowl – SEC champion

The Big East/The American champion took one of the remaining spots.

Additionally, from 1998-99 to 2005-06, when the BCS National Championship Game was one of the bowls, the champions that would otherwise have automatically received a berth in that bowl, would still be guaranteed a berth but in a different bowl. E.g. the Rose Bowl for 2005-06 was the NCG with #1 USC vs #2 Texas. While USC was the Pac-10 champion and therefore no other bowl would be needed to accommodate, Texas took what would have been the Big Ten's spot, therefore the Big Ten champion was selected by a different bowl, in this case the Orange Bowl.

If the Pac-10/Pac-12 or Big Ten champion was picked for the BCS National Championship Game, then the Rose Bowl was required to choose the highest-ranked school from a non-AQ conference if there was a non-AQ school ranked at least #4 in the final BCS standings. This was the case in 2010, when the #2 Oregon Ducks made it to the national championship, permitting the #3 TCU Horned Frogs to attend, and win, the 2011 Rose Bowl. The Rose Bowl was permitted to override this provision if it had been used within the previous four seasons.

As agreed by all 11 conferences, the results of the 2004–07 regular seasons were evaluated to determine which conferences earned automatic qualification for the BCS games that concluded 2008–11 seasons. Three criteria were used: Rank of the highest-ranked team, rank of all conference teams, and number of teams in the top 25. The six conferences which met that standard were the AQ conferences. The 2008–11 seasons were used to determine if another conference achieved automatic qualification, or a conference that had AQ status lost it, for the BCS games that concluded the 2012 and 2013 seasons.

== Rankings ==
For the portions of the ranking that were determined by polls and computer-generated rankings, the BCS used a series of Borda counts to arrive at its overall rankings. This was an example of using a voting system to generate a complete ordered list of winners from both human and computer-constructed votes. Obtaining a fair ranking system was a difficult mathematical problem and numerous algorithms were proposed for ranking college football teams in particular. One example was the "random-walker rankings" studied by applied mathematicians Thomas Callaghan, Peter Mucha, and Mason Porter that employed the science of networks.

=== 1998–2003 ===
The BCS formula calculated the top 25 teams in poll format. After combining a number of factors, a final point total was created and the teams that received the 25 lowest scores were ranked in descending order. The factors were:

- Poll average: Both the AP and ESPN-USA Today coaches polls were averaged to make a number which is the poll average.
- Computer average: An average of the rankings of a team in three different computer polls were gathered (Jeff Sagarin/USA Today, Anderson & Hester/Seattle Times, and The New York Times), with a 50% adjusted maximum deviation factor. (For instance, if the computers had ranked a team third, fifth, and twelfth, the poll which ranked the team twelfth would be adjusted to rank the team sixth.)
- Strength of Schedule: This was the team's NCAA rank in strength of schedule divided by 25. A team's strength of schedule was calculated by win–loss record of opponents (66.7%) and cumulative win–loss record of team's opponents' opponents (33.3%). The team who played the toughest schedule was given .04 points, second toughest .08 points, and so on.

Margin of victory was a key component in the decision of the computer rankings to determine the BCS standings.

- Losses: One point was added for every loss the team has suffered during the season. All games are counted, including Kickoff Classics and conference title games.

Before the 1999–2000 season, five more computer rankings were added to the system: Richard Billingsley, Richard Dunkel, Kenneth Massey, Herman Matthews/Scripps Howard, and David Rothman. The lowest ranking was dropped and the remainder averaged.

Beginning in 2001, The Peter Wolfe and Wes Colley/Atlanta Journal-Constitution computer rankings were used in place of the NYT and Dunkel rankings. The change was made because the BCS wanted computer rankings that did not depend heavily on margin of victory. The highest and lowest rankings were discarded, and the remainder averaged. A team's poll average, computer average, strength of schedule points, and losses were added to create a subtotal.

Also in 2001, a quality win component was added. If a team beat a team which was in the top 15 in the BCS standings, a range of 1.5 to .1 points was subtracted from their total. Beating the No. 1 ranked team resulted in a subtraction of 1.5-point, beating the No. 2 team resulted in a deduction of 1.4 points, and so on. Beating the No. 15 ranked team would have resulted in a deduction of .1 points. A team would only be awarded for a quality win once if it beat a Top 10 team more than once (such as in the regular season and a conference championship game), and quality wins were determined using a team's current subtotal, not the ranking when the game was played. The subtotal ranks were used to determine quality win deductions to create a team's final score.

The BCS continued to purge ranking systems which included margin of victory, causing the removal of the Matthews and Rothman ratings before the 2002 season. Sagarin provided a BCS-specific formula that did not include margin of victory, and The New York Times index returned in a form without margin of victory considerations. In addition, a new computer ranking, the Wesley Colley Matrix, was added. The lowest ranking was dropped and the remaining six averaged. Also in 2002, the quality win component was modified such that the deduction for beating the No. 1 team in the BCS would be 1.0, declining by 0.1 increments until beating the 10th ranked team at 0.1. Teams on probation were not included in the BCS standings, but quality win points were given to teams who beat teams on probation as if they were ranked accordingly in the BCS.

=== 2004–2013 ===
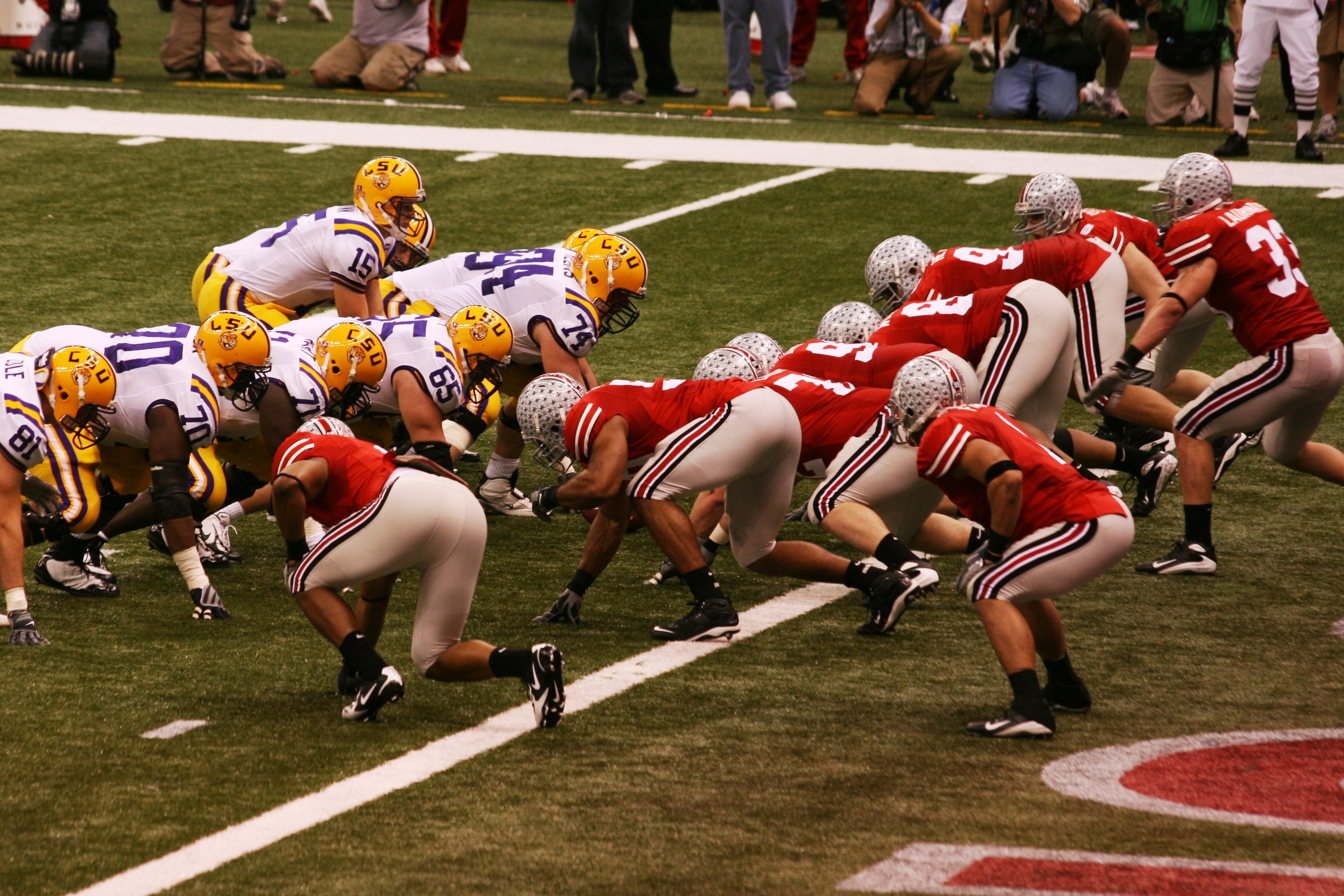
LSU vs. Ohio State in the 2008 BCS National Championship Game

In response to the controversy created by the voters in the AP poll naming USC as the No. 1 ranked team at the end of 2003, when the BCS system had selected LSU and Oklahoma to play for the title, the formula was rewritten. Supporters of USC and the media in general criticized the fact that polls were not weighted more heavily than computer rankings and this criticism led to the new three part formula.

- AP poll (2004) / Harris Interactive College Football Poll (2005–2013): A team's score in the poll was divided by the maximum number of points any team would have received if all voting members had ranked that team as Number 1.
- Coaches' Poll: A team's score in the Coaches' poll was divided by the maximum number of points any team would have received if all voting members had ranked that team as Number 1.
- Computer Average: The BCS used six ranking systems: Jeff Sagarin, Anderson & Hester, Billingsley Report, Colley Matrix, Kenneth Massey, and Dr. Peter Wolfe. Points were assigned in inverse order of ranking from 1 to 25. A team's highest and lowest computer ranking was discarded from figuring a team's computer poll average. The four remaining computer scores were averaged and the total was calculated as a percentage of 100.

All three components – The Harris Interactive Poll, the USA Today Coaches Poll, and the computer rankings – were added together and averaged for a team's ranking in the BCS standings. The team with the highest average ranked first in the BCS standings.

This system placed twice as much emphasis on polls than computer rankings (since there were two polls and an average of six computer rankings) and made it highly unlikely that the top team in both polls would be denied a place in the title game, as it happened in the 2003–04 season.

The BCS formula for the 2005–06 season was the same as 2004–05, except that the Harris Interactive College Football Poll replaced the AP poll. The Harris Interactive College Football Poll's maximum point value was 2,825 and for the Coaches' Poll, it was 1,550. The Harris Interactive College Football Poll was created expressly to replace the AP poll after the Associated Press refused the use of its poll as a component of the BCS formula following the 2004 season. Before the 2006–07 season, the maximum point value of the Harris Poll was increased to 2,850 and the USA Today/Coaches' Poll was increased to 1,575.

In April 2009, Bowl Championship Series commissioners met for its annual spring meetings in Pasadena, California in conjunction with the Rose Bowl's staging the 2010 BCS title game. The commissioners considered a proposal from the Mountain West Conference, which would have established an eight-team playoff and provided better accesses to the four BCS bowl games for the five conferences that did not have automatic bids. The proposal also included a motion to replace the BCS rankings with a selection and a motion to change the automatic qualifier criteria to better reflect inter-conference performance. The BCS rejected the proposal in June 2009, citing a "lack of overall support" among the member conferences.

In June 2012, the BCS conference commissioners made the announcement that "we have developed a consensus behind a four-team, seeded playoff." This took effect in 2014, as the BCS Presidential Oversight Committee in Washington, D.C. gave its expected final approval a few days later.

== Game results ==
Games are listed in chronological order, with final BCS rankings prior to the respective bowl being played.

=== 1998 season ===
Date	Bowl	Winning team		Losing team		Stadium	Location
January 1, 1999	Rose	9 Wisconsin	38	5 UCLA	31	Rose Bowl	Pasadena, California
January 1, 1999	Sugar	4 Ohio State	24	6 Texas A&M	14	Louisiana Superdome	New Orleans, Louisiana
January 2, 1999	Orange	8 Florida	31	15 Syracuse	10	Miami Orange Bowl	Miami, Florida
January 4, 1999	Fiesta (Nat'l Champ.)	1 Tennessee	23	2 Florida State	16	Sun Devil Stadium	Tempe, Arizona

=== 1999 season ===
Date	Bowl	Winning team		Losing team		Stadium	Location
January 1, 2000	Rose	7 Wisconsin	17	22 Stanford	9	Rose Bowl	Pasadena, California
January 1, 2000	Orange	8 Michigan	35^{OT}	4 Alabama	34	Pro Player Stadium	Miami Gardens, Florida
January 2, 2000	Fiesta	3 Nebraska	31	5 Tennessee	21	Sun Devil Stadium	Tempe, Arizona
January 4, 2000	Sugar (Nat'l Champ.)	1 Florida State	46	2 Virginia Tech	29	Louisiana Superdome	New Orleans, Louisiana

=== 2000 season ===
Date	Bowl	Winning team		Losing team		Stadium	Location
January 1, 2001	Rose	4 Washington	34	17 Purdue	24	Rose Bowl	Pasadena, California
January 1, 2001	Fiesta	6 Oregon State	41	11 Notre Dame	9	Sun Devil Stadium	Tempe, Arizona
January 2, 2001	Sugar	3 Miami (FL)	31	7 Florida	21	Louisiana Superdome	New Orleans, Louisiana
January 3, 2001	Orange (Nat'l Champ.)	1 Oklahoma	13	2 Florida State	2	Pro Player Stadium	Miami Gardens, Florida

=== 2001 season ===
Date	Bowl	Winning team		Losing team		Stadium	Location
January 1, 2002	Fiesta	4 Oregon	38	3 Colorado	16	Sun Devil Stadium	Tempe, Arizona
January 1, 2002	Sugar	13 LSU	47	8 Illinois	34	Louisiana Superdome	New Orleans, Louisiana
January 2, 2002	Orange	5 Florida	56	10 Maryland	23	Pro Player Stadium	Miami Gardens, Florida
January 3, 2002	Rose (Nat'l Champ.)	1 Miami (FL)	37	2 Nebraska	14	Rose Bowl	Pasadena, California

=== 2002 season ===
Date	Bowl	Winning team		Losing team		Stadium	Location
January 1, 2003	Rose	7 Oklahoma	34	6 Washington State	14	Rose Bowl	Pasadena, California
January 1, 2003	Sugar	3 Georgia	26	14 Florida State	13	Louisiana Superdome	New Orleans, Louisiana
January 2, 2003	Orange	4 USC	38	5 Iowa	17	Pro Player Stadium	Miami Gardens, Florida
January 3, 2003	Fiesta (Nat'l Champ.)	2 Ohio State	31^{2OT}	1 Miami (FL)	24	Sun Devil Stadium	Tempe, Arizona

=== 2003 season ===
Date	Bowl	Winning team		Losing team		Stadium	Location
January 1, 2004	Rose	3 USC	28	4 Michigan	14	Rose Bowl	Pasadena, California
January 1, 2004	Orange	9 Miami (FL)	16	7 Florida State	14	Pro Player Stadium	Miami Gardens, Florida
January 2, 2004	Fiesta	5 Ohio State	35	10 Kansas State	28	Sun Devil Stadium	Tempe, Arizona
January 4, 2004	Sugar (Nat'l Champ.)	2 LSU	21	1 Oklahoma	14	Louisiana Superdome	New Orleans, Louisiana

=== 2004 season ===
Date	Bowl	Winning team		Losing team		Stadium	Location
January 1, 2005	Rose	4 Texas	38	13 Michigan	37	Rose Bowl	Pasadena, California
January 1, 2005	Fiesta	6 Utah	35	21 Pittsburgh	7	Sun Devil Stadium	Tempe, Arizona
January 3, 2005	Sugar	3 Auburn	16	8 Virginia Tech	13	Louisiana Superdome	New Orleans, Louisiana
January 4, 2005	Orange (Nat'l Champ.)	1 USC	55	2 Oklahoma	19	Pro Player Stadium	Miami Gardens, Florida

=== 2005 season ===
Date	Bowl	Winning team		Losing team		Stadium	Location
January 2, 2006	Fiesta	4 Ohio State	34	6 Notre Dame	20	Sun Devil Stadium	Tempe, Arizona
January 2, 2006	Sugar	11 West Virginia	38	7 Georgia	35	Georgia Dome	Atlanta, Georgia
January 3, 2006	Orange	3 Penn State	26^{OT}	22 Florida State	23	Dolphins Stadium	Miami Gardens, Florida
January 4, 2006	Rose (Nat'l Champ.)	2 Texas	41	1 USC	38	Rose Bowl	Pasadena, California

=== 2006 season ===
Date	Bowl	Winning team		Losing team		Stadium	Location
January 1, 2007	Rose	5 USC	34	3 Michigan	20	Rose Bowl	Pasadena, California
January 1, 2007	Fiesta	8 Boise State	43^{OT}	10 Oklahoma	42	University of Phoenix Stadium	Glendale, Arizona
January 2, 2007	Orange	6 Louisville	24	14 Wake Forest	13	Dolphin Stadium	Miami Gardens, Florida
January 3, 2007	Sugar	4 LSU	41	11 Notre Dame	14	Louisiana Superdome	New Orleans, Louisiana
January 8, 2007	Nat'l Champ.	2 Florida	41	1 Ohio State	14	University of Phoenix Stadium	Glendale, Arizona

=== 2007 season ===
Date	Bowl	Winning team		Losing team		Stadium	Location
January 1, 2008	Rose	7 USC	49	13 Illinois	17	Rose Bowl	Pasadena, California
January 1, 2008	Sugar	5 Georgia	41	10 Hawaii	10	Louisiana Superdome	New Orleans, Louisiana
January 2, 2008	Fiesta	9 West Virginia	48	4 Oklahoma	28	University of Phoenix Stadium	Glendale, Arizona
January 3, 2008	Orange	8 Kansas	24	3 Virginia Tech	21	Dolphin Stadium	Miami Gardens, Florida
January 7, 2008	Nat'l Champ.	2 LSU	38	1 Ohio State	24	Louisiana Superdome	New Orleans, Louisiana

=== 2008 season ===
Date	Bowl	Winning team		Losing team		Stadium	Location
January 1, 2009	Rose	5 USC	38	8 Penn State	24	Rose Bowl	Pasadena, California
January 1, 2009	Orange	19 Virginia Tech	20	12 Cincinnati	7	Dolphin Stadium	Miami Gardens, Florida
January 2, 2009	Sugar	6 Utah	31	4 Alabama	17	Louisiana Superdome	New Orleans, Louisiana
January 5, 2009	Fiesta	3 Texas	24	10 Ohio State	21	University of Phoenix Stadium	Glendale, Arizona
January 8, 2009	Nat'l Champ.	2 Florida	24	1 Oklahoma	14	Dolphin Stadium	Miami Gardens, Florida

=== 2009 season ===
Date	Bowl	Winning team		Losing team		Stadium	Location
January 1, 2010	Rose	8 Ohio State	26	7 Oregon	17	Rose Bowl	Pasadena, California
January 1, 2010	Sugar	5 Florida	51	3 Cincinnati	24	Louisiana Superdome	New Orleans, Louisiana
January 4, 2010	Fiesta	6 Boise State	31	4 TCU	17	University of Phoenix Stadium	Glendale, Arizona
January 5, 2010	Orange	10 Iowa	24	9 Georgia Tech	21	Land Shark Stadium	Miami Gardens, Florida
January 7, 2010	Nat'l Champ.	1 Alabama	37	2 Texas	21	Rose Bowl	Pasadena, California

=== 2010 season ===
Date	Bowl	Winning team		Losing team		Stadium	Location
January 1, 2011	Rose	3 TCU	21	5 Wisconsin	19	Rose Bowl	Pasadena, California
January 1, 2011	Fiesta	7 Oklahoma	48	Connecticut	20	University of Phoenix Stadium	Glendale, Arizona
January 3, 2011	Orange	4 Stanford	40	13 Virginia Tech	12	Sun Life Stadium	Miami Gardens, Florida
January 4, 2011	Sugar	6 Ohio State	31	8 Arkansas	26	Louisiana Superdome	New Orleans, Louisiana
January 10, 2011	Nat'l Champ.	1 Auburn	22	2 Oregon	19	University of Phoenix Stadium	Glendale, Arizona

=== 2011 season ===
Date	Bowl	Winning team		Losing team		Stadium	Location
January 2, 2012	Rose	5 Oregon	45	10 Wisconsin	38	Rose Bowl	Pasadena, California
January 2, 2012	Fiesta	3 Oklahoma State	41^{OT}	4 Stanford	38	University of Phoenix Stadium	Glendale, Arizona
January 3, 2012	Sugar	13 Michigan	23^{OT}	11 Virginia Tech	20	Mercedes-Benz Superdome	New Orleans, Louisiana
January 4, 2012	Orange	23 West Virginia	70	15 Clemson	33	Sun Life Stadium	Miami Gardens, Florida
January 9, 2012	Nat'l Champ.	2 Alabama	21	1 LSU	0	Mercedes-Benz Superdome	New Orleans, Louisiana

=== 2012 season ===
Date	Bowl	Winning team		Losing team		Stadium	Location
January 1, 2013	Rose	6 Stanford	20	Wisconsin	14	Rose Bowl	Pasadena, California
January 1, 2013	Orange	12 Florida State	31	15 Northern Illinois	10	Sun Life Stadium	Miami Gardens, Florida
January 2, 2013	Sugar	21 Louisville	33	3 Florida	23	Mercedes-Benz Superdome	New Orleans, Louisiana
January 3, 2013	Fiesta	4 Oregon	35	5 Kansas State	17	University of Phoenix Stadium	Glendale, Arizona
January 7, 2013	Nat'l Champ.	2 Alabama	42	1 Notre Dame	14	Sun Life Stadium	Miami Gardens, Florida

=== 2013 season ===
Date	Bowl	Winning team		Losing team		Stadium	Location
January 1, 2014	Rose	4 Michigan State	24	5 Stanford	20	Rose Bowl	Pasadena, California
January 1, 2014	Fiesta	15 UCF	52	6 Baylor	42	University of Phoenix Stadium	Glendale, Arizona
January 2, 2014	Sugar	11 Oklahoma	45	3 Alabama	31	Mercedes-Benz Superdome	New Orleans, Louisiana
January 3, 2014	Orange	12 Clemson	40	7 Ohio State	35	Sun Life Stadium	Miami Gardens, Florida
January 6, 2014	Nat'l Champ.	1 Florida State	34	2 Auburn	31	Rose Bowl	Pasadena, California

== Appearances ==
=== Selections by year ===
Season	ACC champion	Big East champion	Big Ten champion	Big 12 champion	Pac-10/12 champion	SEC champion	At-large bid(s)	Highest-ranked non-AQ conference champion
1998	2 Florida State (11–1)	15 Syracuse (8–3)	4 Ohio State (10–1); 9 Wisconsin (10–1)	6 Texas A&M (11–2)	5 UCLA (10–1)	1 Tennessee (12–0)	8 Florida (9–2)	
1999	1 Florida State (11–0)	2 Virginia Tech (11–0)	7 Wisconsin (9–2)	3 Nebraska (11–1)	22 Stanford (8–3)	4 Alabama (10–2)	5 Tennessee (9–2); 8 Michigan (9–2)	
2000	2 Florida State (11–1)	3 Miami (FL) (10–1)	17 Purdue (8–3)	1 Oklahoma (12–0)	4 Washington (10–1); 6 Oregon State (10–1)	7 Florida (10–2)	11 Notre Dame (9–2)	
2001	10 Maryland (10–1)	1 Miami (FL) (11–0)	8 Illinois (10–1)	3 Colorado (10–2)	4 Oregon (10–1)	13 LSU (9–3)	2 Nebraska (11–1); 5 Florida (9–2)	
2002	14 Florida State (9–4)	1 Miami (FL) (12–0)	2 Ohio State (13–0); 5 Iowa (11–1)	7 Oklahoma (11–2)	4 USC (10–2); 6 Washington State (10–2)	3 Georgia (12–1)	—	
2003	7 Florida State (10–2)	9 Miami (FL) (10–2)	4 Michigan (10–2)	10 Kansas State (11–3)	3 USC (11–1)	2 LSU (12–1)	1 Oklahoma (12–1); 5 Ohio State (10–2)	
2004	8 Virginia Tech (10–2)	21 Pittsburgh (8–3)	13 Michigan (9–2)	2 Oklahoma (12–0)	1 USC (12–0)	3 Auburn (12–0)	4 Texas (10–1); 6 Utah (11–0)	
2005	22 Florida State (7–5)	11 West Virginia (10–1)	3 Penn State (10–1); 4 Ohio State (9–2)	2 Texas (12–0)	1 USC (12–0)	7 Georgia (10–2)	6 Notre Dame (9–2)	
2006	14 Wake Forest (11–2)	6 Louisville (11–1)	1 Ohio State (12–0)	10 Oklahoma (11–2)	5 USC (10–2)	2 Florida (12–1)	3 Michigan (11–1); 4 LSU (10–2); 11 Notre Dame (10–2)	8 Boise State (12–0)
2007	3 Virginia Tech (11–2)	9 West Virginia (10–2)	1 Ohio State (11–1)	4 Oklahoma (11–2)	7 USC (10–2)	2 LSU (11–2)	5 Georgia (10–2); 8 Kansas (11–1); 13 Illinois (9–3)	10 Hawaii (12–0)
2008	19 Virginia Tech (9–4)	12 Cincinnati (11–2)	8 Penn State (11–1); 10 Ohio State (10–2)	1 Oklahoma (12–1)	5 USC (11–1)	2 Florida (12–1)	3 Texas (11–1); 4 Alabama (12–1)	6 Utah (12–0)
2009	9 Georgia Tech (11–2)	3 Cincinnati (12–0)	8 Ohio State (10–2)	2 Texas (13–0)	7 Oregon (10–2)	1 Alabama (13–0)	5 Florida (12–1); 6 Boise State (13–0); 10 Iowa (10–2)	4 TCU (12–0)
2010	13 Virginia Tech (11–2)	Connecticut (8–4)	5 Wisconsin (11–1); 6 Ohio State (11–1)	7 Oklahoma (11–2)	2 Oregon (12–0)	1 Auburn (13–0)	4 Stanford (11–1); 8 Arkansas (10–2)	3 TCU (12–0)
2011	15 Clemson (10–3)	23 West Virginia (9–3)	10 Wisconsin (11–2)	3 Oklahoma State (11–1)	5 Oregon (11–2)	1 LSU (13–0)	2 Alabama (11–1); 4 Stanford (11–1); 11 Virginia Tech (11–2); 13 Michigan (10–2)	— (Note: TCU (10–2) was the highest-ranked Group of Five conference champion, but was ranked 18th in the final BCS standings. BCS rules required the highest-ranked Group of Five conference champion to either finish in the top 12 or finish in the top 16 and be ranked ahead of at least one automatic-qualifying conference champion in order to be invited to a BCS bowl.)
2012	12 Florida State (11–2)	21 Louisville (10–2)	Wisconsin (8–5)	5 Kansas State (11–1)	6 Stanford (11–2)	2 Alabama (12–1)	1 Notre Dame (12–0); 3 Florida (11–1); 4 Oregon (11–1)	15 Northern Illinois (12–1)
2013	1 Florida State (13–0)	15 UCF (11–1) (Note: After the collapse of the Big East Conference, the newly-formed American Athletic Conference took over the Big East's automatic qualifying spot for the 2013 season.)	4 Michigan State (12–1)	6 Baylor (11–1)	5 Stanford (11–2)	2 Auburn (12–1)	3 Alabama (11–1); 7 Ohio State (12–1); 11 Oklahoma (10–2); 12 Clemson (10–2)	— (Note: Fresno State (11–1) was the highest-ranked Group of Five conference champion, but finished 20th in the final BCS standings. BCS rules required the highest-ranked Group of Five conference champion to either finish in the top 12 or finish in the top 16 and be ranked ahead of at least one automatic-qualifying conference champion in order to be invited to a BCS bowl.)

=== Appearances by team ===
Key
BCS National Championship Game

Team	Conf.	Apps.	Champs.	W	L	%	Season	Rank	Result
Ohio State	Big Ten	10	1	6	4	.600	1998	4	W Sugar
Ohio State	Big Ten	10	1	6	4	.600	2002	2	W Fiesta
Ohio State	Big Ten	10	1	6	4	.600	2003	5	W Fiesta
Ohio State	Big Ten	10	1	6	4	.600	2005	4	W Fiesta
Ohio State	Big Ten	10	1	6	4	.600	2006	1	L Nat'l Champ.
Ohio State	Big Ten	10	1	6	4	.600	2007	1	L Nat'l Champ
Ohio State	Big Ten	10	1	6	4	.600	2008	10	L Fiesta
Ohio State	Big Ten	10	1	6	4	.600	2009	8	W Rose
Ohio State	Big Ten	10	1	6	4	.600	2010	6	W Sugar
Ohio State	Big Ten	10	1	6	4	.600	2013	7	L Orange
Oklahoma	Big 12	9	1	4	5	.444	2000	1	W Orange
Oklahoma	Big 12	9	1	4	5	.444	2002	7	W Rose
Oklahoma	Big 12	9	1	4	5	.444	2003	1	L Sugar
Oklahoma	Big 12	9	1	4	5	.444	2004	2	L Orange
Oklahoma	Big 12	9	1	4	5	.444	2006	10	L Fiesta
Oklahoma	Big 12	9	1	4	5	.444	2007	4	L Fiesta
Oklahoma	Big 12	9	1	4	5	.444	2008	1	L Nat'l Champ.
Oklahoma	Big 12	9	1	4	5	.444	2010	7	W Fiesta
Oklahoma	Big 12	9	1	4	5	.444	2013	11	W Sugar
Florida State	ACC	8	2	3	5	.375	1998	2	L Fiesta
Florida State	ACC	8	2	3	5	.375	1999	1	W Sugar
Florida State	ACC	8	2	3	5	.375	2000	2	L Orange
Florida State	ACC	8	2	3	5	.375	2002	14	L Sugar
Florida State	ACC	8	2	3	5	.375	2003	7	L Orange
Florida State	ACC	8	2	3	5	.375	2005	22	L Orange
Florida State	ACC	8	2	3	5	.375	2012	12	L Orange
Florida State	ACC	8	2	3	5	.375	2013	1	W Nat'l Champ.
Florida	SEC	7	2	5	2	.714	1998	8	W Orange
Florida	SEC	7	2	5	2	.714	2000	7	L Sugar
Florida	SEC	7	2	5	2	.714	2001	5	L Orange
Florida	SEC	7	2	5	2	.714	2006	2	W Nat'l Champ.
Florida	SEC	7	2	5	2	.714	2008	2	W Nat'l Champ.
Florida	SEC	7	2	5	2	.714	2009	5	W Sugar
Florida	SEC	7	2	5	2	.714	2012	3	W Sugar
USC	Pac-12	7	1	6	1	.857	2002	4	W Orange
USC	Pac-12	7	1	6	1	.857	2003	3	W Rose
USC	Pac-12	7	1	6	1	.857	2004	1	W Orange
USC	Pac-12	7	1	6	1	.857	2005	1	L Rose
USC	Pac-12	7	1	6	1	.857	2006	5	W Rose
USC	Pac-12	7	1	6	1	.857	2007	7	W Rose
USC	Pac-12	7	1	6	1	.857	2008	5	W Rose
Alabama	SEC	6	3	3	3	.500	1999	4	L Orange
Alabama	SEC	6	3	3	3	.500	2008	4	L Sugar
Alabama	SEC	6	3	3	3	.500	2009	1	W Nat'l Champ.
Alabama	SEC	6	3	3	3	.500	2011	2	W Nat'l Champ.
Alabama	SEC	6	3	3	3	.500	2012	2	W Nat'l Champ.
Alabama	SEC	6	3	3	3	.500	2013	3	L Sugar
Virginia Tech	Big East	6	0	1	5	.167	1999	2	L Sugar
Virginia Tech	ACC	6	0	1	5	.167	2004	8	L Sugar
Virginia Tech	ACC	6	0	1	5	.167	2007	3	L Orange
Virginia Tech	ACC	6	0	1	5	.167	2008	19	W Orange
Virginia Tech	ACC	6	0	1	5	.167	2010	13	L Orange
Virginia Tech	ACC	6	0	1	5	.167	2011	11	L Sugar
LSU	SEC	5	2	4	1	.800	2001	13	W Sugar
LSU	SEC	5	2	4	1	.800	2003	2	W Sugar
LSU	SEC	5	2	4	1	.800	2006	4	W Sugar
LSU	SEC	5	2	4	1	.800	2007	2	W Nat'l Champ.
LSU	SEC	5	2	4	1	.800	2011	1	L Nat'l Champ.
Oregon	Pac-12	5	0	3	2	.600	2001	4	W Fiesta
Oregon	Pac-12	5	0	3	2	.600	2009	7	L Rose
Oregon	Pac-12	5	0	3	2	.600	2010	2	L Nat'l Champ.
Oregon	Pac-12	5	0	3	2	.600	2011	5	W Rose
Oregon	Pac-12	5	0	3	2	.600	2012	4	W Fiesta
Wisconsin	Big Ten	5	0	2	3	.400	1998	9	W Rose
Wisconsin	Big Ten	5	0	2	3	.400	1999	7	W Rose
Wisconsin	Big Ten	5	0	2	3	.400	2010	5	L Rose
Wisconsin	Big Ten	5	0	2	3	.400	2011	10	L Rose
Wisconsin	Big Ten	5	0	2	3	.400	2012	—	L Rose
Michigan	Big Ten	5	0	2	3	.400	1999	8	W Orange
Michigan	Big Ten	5	0	2	3	.400	2003	4	L Rose
Michigan	Big Ten	5	0	2	3	.400	2004	13	L Rose
Michigan	Big Ten	5	0	2	3	.400	2006	3	L Rose
Michigan	Big Ten	5	0	2	3	.400	2011	13	W Sugar
Stanford	Pac-12	5	0	2	3	.400	1999	22	L Rose
Stanford	Pac-12	5	0	2	3	.400	2010	4	W Orange
Stanford	Pac-12	5	0	2	3	.400	2011	4	L Fiesta
Stanford	Pac-12	5	0	2	3	.400	2012	6	W Rose
Stanford	Pac-12	5	0	2	3	.400	2013	5	L Rose
Miami (FL)	Big East	4	1	3	1	.750	2000	3	W Sugar
Miami (FL)	Big East	4	1	3	1	.750	2001	1	W Rose
Miami (FL)	Big East	4	1	3	1	.750	2002	1	L Fiesta
Miami (FL)	Big East	4	1	3	1	.750	2003	9	W Orange
Texas	Big 12	4	1	3	1	.750	2004	4	W Rose
Texas	Big 12	4	1	3	1	.750	2005	2	W Rose
Texas	Big 12	4	1	3	1	.750	2008	3	W Fiesta
Texas	Big 12	4	1	3	1	.750	2009	2	L Nat'l Champ.
Notre Dame	Independent	4	0	0	4	.000	2000	11	L Fiesta
Notre Dame	Independent	4	0	0	4	.000	2005	6	L Fiesta
Notre Dame	Independent	4	0	0	4	.000	2006	11	L Sugar
Notre Dame	Independent	4	0	0	4	.000	2012	1	L Nat'l Champ.
Auburn	SEC	3	1	2	1	.667	2004	3	W Sugar
Auburn	SEC	3	1	2	1	.667	2010	1	W Nat'l Champ.
Auburn	SEC	3	1	2	1	.667	2013	2	L Nat'l Champ.
West Virginia	Big East	3	0	3	0	1.000	2005	11	W Sugar
West Virginia	Big East	3	0	3	0	1.000	2007	9	W Fiesta
West Virginia	Big East	3	0	3	0	1.000	2011	23	W Orange
Georgia	SEC	3	0	2	1	.667	2002	3	W Sugar
Georgia	SEC	3	0	2	1	.667	2005	7	L Sugar
Georgia	SEC	3	0	2	1	.667	2007	5	W Sugar
Tennessee	SEC	2	1	1	1	.500	1998	1	W Fiesta
Tennessee	SEC	2	1	1	1	.500	1999	5	L Fiesta
Utah	MWC	2	0	2	0	1.000	2004	6	W Fiesta
Utah	MWC	2	0	2	0	1.000	2008	6	W Sugar
Boise State	WAC	2	0	2	0	1.000	2006	8	W Fiesta
Boise State	WAC	2	0	2	0	1.000	2009	6	W Fiesta
Louisville	Big East	2	0	2	0	1.000	2006	6	W Orange
Louisville	Big East	2	0	2	0	1.000	2012	21	W Sugar
Nebraska	Big 12	2	0	1	1	.500	1999	3	W Fiesta
Nebraska	Big 12	2	0	1	1	.500	2001	2	L Rose
Iowa	Big Ten	2	0	1	1	.500	2002	5	L Orange
Iowa	Big Ten	2	0	1	1	.500	2009	10	W Orange
Penn State	Big Ten	2	0	1	1	.500	2005	3	W Orange
Penn State	Big Ten	2	0	1	1	.500	2008	8	L Rose
TCU	MWC	2	0	1	1	.500	2009	4	L Fiesta
TCU	MWC	2	0	1	1	.500	2010	3	W Rose
Clemson	ACC	2	0	1	1	.500	2011	15	L Orange
Clemson	ACC	2	0	1	1	.500	2013	12	W Orange
Illinois	Big Ten	2	0	0	2	.000	2001	8	L Sugar
Illinois	Big Ten	2	0	0	2	.000	2007	13	L Rose
Kansas State	Big 12	2	0	0	2	.000	2003	10	L Fiesta
Kansas State	Big 12	2	0	0	2	.000	2012	5	L Fiesta
Cincinnati	Big East	2	0	0	2	.000	2008	12	L Orange
Cincinnati	Big East	2	0	0	2	.000	2009	3	L Sugar
Oregon State	Pac-10	1	0	1	0	1.000	2000	6	W Fiesta
Washington	Pac-10	1	0	1	0	1.000	2000	4	W Rose
Kansas	Big 12	1	0	1	0	1.000	2007	8	W Orange
Oklahoma State	Big 12	1	0	1	0	1.000	2011	3	W Fiesta
Michigan State	Big Ten	1	0	1	0	1.000	2013	4	W Rose
UCF	AAC	1	0	1	0	1.000	2013	15	W Fiesta
Syracuse	Big East	1	0	0	1	.000	1998	15	L Orange
Texas A&M	Big 12	1	0	0	1	.000	1998	6	L Sugar
UCLA	Pac-10	1	0	0	1	.000	1998	5	L Rose
Purdue	Big Ten	1	0	0	1	.000	2000	17	L Rose
Colorado	Big 12	1	0	0	1	.000	2001	10	L Fiesta
Maryland	ACC	1	0	0	1	.000	2001	10	L Orange
Washington State	Pac-10	1	0	0	1	.000	2002	6	L Rose
Pittsburgh	Big East	1	0	0	1	.000	2004	21	L Fiesta
Wake Forest	ACC	1	0	0	1	.000	2006	14	L Orange
Hawaii	WAC	1	0	0	1	.000	2007	10	L Sugar
Georgia Tech	ACC	1	0	0	1	.000	2009	9	L Orange
Arkansas	SEC	1	0	0	1	.000	2010	8	L Sugar
Connecticut	Big East	1	0	0	1	.000	2010	—	L Fiesta
Northern Illinois	MAC	1	0	0	1	.000	2012	15	L Orange
Baylor	Big 12	1	0	0	1	.000	2013	6	L Fiesta

=== Appearances by conference ===
Conf.	Apps.	Champs.	W	L	%	Season															
Conf.	Apps.	Champs.	W	L	%	1998	1999	2000	2001	2002	2003	2004	2005	2006	2007	2008	2009	2010	2011	2012	2013
Big Ten	28	1	13	15	.483	2–0	2–0	0–1	0–1	1–1	1–1	0–1	2–0	0–2	0–2	0–2	2–0	1–1	1–1	0–1	1–1
SEC	27	9	17	10	.630	2–0	0–2	0–1	2–0	1–0	1–0	1–0	0–1	2–0	2–0	1–1	2–0	1–1	1–1	1–1	0–2
Big 12	22	2	10	12	.455	0–1	1–0	1–0	0–2	1–0	0–2	1–0	1–0	0–1	1–1	1–1	0–1	1–0	1–0	0–1	0–1
Pac-12	21	1	13	8	.619	0–1	0–1	2–0	1–0	1–1	1–0	1–0	0–1	1–0	1–0	1–0	0–1	1–1	1–1	2–0	1–1
ACC	18	2	5	13	.278	0–1	1–0	0–1	0–1	0–1	0–1	0–1	0–1	0–1	0–1	1–0	0–1	0–1	0–2	1–0	2–0
Big East/AAC	16	1	9	7	.563	0–1	0–1	1–0	1–0	0–1	1–0	0–1	1–0	1–0	1–0	0–1	0–1	0–1	1–0	1–0	1–0
MWC	4	0	3	1	.750	—	—	—	—	—	—	1–0	—	—	—	1–0	0–1	1–0	—	—	—
Independent	4	0	0	4	.000	—	—	0–1	—	—	—	—	0–1	0–1	—	—	—	—	—	0–1	—
WAC	3	0	2	1	.667	—	—	—	—	—	—	—	—	1–0	0–1	—	1–0	—	—	—	—
MAC	1	0	0	1	.000	—	—	—	—	—	—	—	—	—	—	—	—	—	—	0–1	—

== Controversies ==
=== Criticism ===
The primary criticism of the BCS centered around the validity of the annual BCS national championship pairings and its designated National Champions. Many critics focused on the BCS methodology itself, which employed subjective voting assessments, while others noted the ability for undefeated teams to finish seasons without an opportunity to play in the national championship game. In fact, in the last 6 seasons of Division I FBS football, there had been more undefeated non-BCS champions than undefeated BCS champions. Other criticisms involved discrepancies in the allocation of monetary resources from BCS games, as well as the determination of non-championship BCS game participants, which did not have to comply with the BCS rankings themselves. In the 2010–2011 bowl season, for example, the six automatic-qualifier (AQ) conferences were given $145.2 million in revenue from the BCS while the five non-AQ conferences received only $24.7 million.

A 2012 survey conducted at the Quinnipiac University Polling Institute found that 63% of individuals interested in college football preferred a playoff system to the BCS, while only 26% favored the status quo. President Barack Obama had been vocal about his opposition to the BCS. During an appearance on Monday Night Football during the 2008 presidential campaign season, ESPN's Chris Berman asked Obama to name one thing about sports he would like to change. Obama responded that he did not like using computer rankings to determine bowl games, and he supported having a college football playoffs for the top eight teams. When Steve Kroft asked then-President-elect Obama about the subject during an interview on 60 Minutes, Obama reiterated his support of eight-team playoffs; although he said it was not a legislative priority, he was considering an executive order to address the issue.

Longtime college football announcer Brent Musburger also voiced his support for playoffs in college football in an interview with the Chicago Sun-Times. "My dream scenario – and it's not going to happen – would be to take eight conference champions, and only conference champions, and play the quarterfinals of a tournament on campuses in mid-December", Musburger said. "The four losers would remain bowl-eligible. The four winners would advance to semifinals on New Year's Day with exclusive TV windows. Then, like now, one week later, there would be the national championship game."

=== Antitrust lawsuits ===
In 2008, a lawsuit was threatened due to the exclusion of teams from the non-automatic qualifying conferences in the BCS system. Following Utah's win over Alabama in the 2009 Sugar Bowl, Utah Attorney General Mark Shurtleff announced an inquiry into whether the BCS system violates federal antitrust laws. In 2009, senior Utah senator Orrin Hatch announced that he was exploring the possibility of a lawsuit against the BCS as an anti-competitive trust under the Sherman Antitrust Act. On November 27, 2009, the Fort Worth Star-Telegram ran a story that said that Rep. Joe Barton (R-TX), ranking member of the House Committee on Energy and Commerce, announced that he would hold antitrust hearings on the BCS, again based on the Sherman Antitrust Act and its provisions outlawing non-competitive trusts, beginning in May 2010. Meanwhile, various organizations, including the BCS, spent hundreds of thousands of dollars to lobby the federal government both in support and in opposition to a college football playoffs system.

According to CBSSports.com wire reports and information obtained by the Associated Press, Senator Orrin Hatch received a letter from the Justice Department concerning the possibility of a legal review of the BCS. The letter, received on January 29, 2010, stated that the Obama administration would explore options to establish a college football playoffs including (a) an antitrust lawsuit against the BCS, (b) legal action under Federal Trade Commission consumer protection laws, (c) encouragement of the NCAA to take control of the college football postseason, (d) the establishment of an agency to review the costs and benefits of adopting a playoff system, and (e) continued legislation in favor of a playoff system. Assistant Attorney General Ronald Weich wrote, "The administration shares your belief that the lack of a college football national championship playoff ...raises important questions affecting millions...." BCS Executive Director Bill Hancock responded to the letter that the BCS complied with all laws and was supported by the participating Division I universities.

In April 2011, Utah attorney general Mark Shurtleff announced he would file an antitrust lawsuit against the BCS for, "serious antitrust violations that are harming taxpayer-funded institutions to the tune of hundreds of millions of dollars." The announcement followed the April 12, 2011 delivery of a letter to the US Department of Justice signed by 21 "high-profile" economists and antitrust experts asking for an investigation into the BCS' anticompetitive practices.

=== Allegations of corruption and financial impropriety ===
The BCS bowls had been accused of promoting the BCS system because they and their executive officers greatly benefited financially from the system. Bowl executives, such as John Junker of the Fiesta Bowl, were often paid unusually high salaries for employees of non-profit organizations. To promote support for their bowls and the BCS system, these highly paid executives allegedly gave lavish gifts to politicians, collegiate sports executives, and university athletic directors.

In response, a pro-playoff organization, called Playoff PAC, in September 2010 filed a complaint with the Internal Revenue Service. The complaint alleged that the top BCS bowls, with the exception of the Rose Bowl, routinely abused favorable tax status by using charitable donations to give gifts and compensation to college athletic officials. In one example detailed in the complaint, the Orange Bowl treated its executive staff and invited college athletic directors to a four-day Royal Caribbean cruise in which no business meetings were held.

=== Vacated wins ===
There were several occasions where a team's victory in a BCS bowl game was subsequently vacated by NCAA sanctions.

- USC's final appeals were exhausted in the Reggie Bush situation, with all penalties standing, including a two-year bowl ban and vacation of 14 wins, including a national championship in the Orange Bowl and the entire 2005 season. As a result, the BCS, in a first-time action, vacated the participation of USC in their 2004–2005 National Championship Game win and the 2005–2006 National Championship Game loss to Texas. The 2004–2005 BCS National Championship will remain permanently vacant. This issue was further compounded by the Associated Press, whose writers vote on their own National Championship. That title was retained, with the AP staying consistent with similar policies with teams on postseason bans. (Teams being penalized with postseason bans are still eligible for the AP National Championship title.)
- In December 2010, five Ohio State University players were implicated in an illegal-benefits scandal preceding the 2011 Sugar Bowl. Though the five players were suspended for five games apiece, they were allowed to play in the Sugar Bowl. After defeating Arkansas, the scandal grew, including open deception by Ohio State coach Jim Tressel. As a result, the school fined Tressel $250,000 and then forced him out as coach on July 11, 2011, Ohio State vacated all of its wins in an effort to reduce their penalties. The NCAA gave Ohio State 3 years probation and reduced their football scholarships by 3 per year for three years. The BCS banned Ohio State from participating in any post season games for the 2012 season.

=== Support ===
While there was substantial criticism aimed at the BCS system from coaches, media, and fans alike, there was also support for the system. Tim Cowlishaw of The Dallas Morning News cited several advantages that the BCS has over a playoff system. Under the BCS, a single defeat was extremely detrimental to a team's prospects for a national championship, although critics pointed out regularly that history shows non-AQ conference teams were hurt far more than AQ conference teams when they lost a game. Supporters contended that this created a substantial incentive for teams to do their best to win every game. Under a proposed playoffs system, front-running teams could be in a position of safety at the end of the regular season and could pull or greatly reduce their use of top players in order to protect them from injuries or give them recovery time (this happens frequently in the NFL). This may have been less likely to happen under the BCS system where a team in the running for a No. 1 or No. 2 ranking at the end of the year would likely have been punished in the polls for a loss, potentially eliminating them from contention.

While the BCS routinely involved controversy about which two teams are the top teams, in rare instances there was a clear-cut top two; the BCS ensured these top two would play each other for the championship. For example, USC and Texas in 2005 were the only undefeated teams; both teams were only tested a couple of times all season and mauled every other opponent they faced by large margins. Had this scenario occurred before the inception of the BCS, the teams would have been unable to play each other due to contractual obligations with the major bowls and there would have been dual national champions. Under the BCS system however, these two teams got to play for the championship.

The NCAA, the governing organization of most collegiate sports, had no official process for determining its FBS (Div. 1-A) champion. Instead, FBS champions were chosen by what the NCAA called in its official list of champions "selecting organizations".

According to its website, the BCS: "...[wa]s managed by the commissioners of the 11 NCAA Division I-A conferences, the director of athletics at the University of Notre Dame, and representatives of the bowl organizations. "...[wa]s a five-game arrangement for post-season college football that [wa]s designed to match the two top-rated teams in a national championship game and to create exciting and competitive match-ups between eight other highly regarded teams in four other games".

== BCS Buster ==
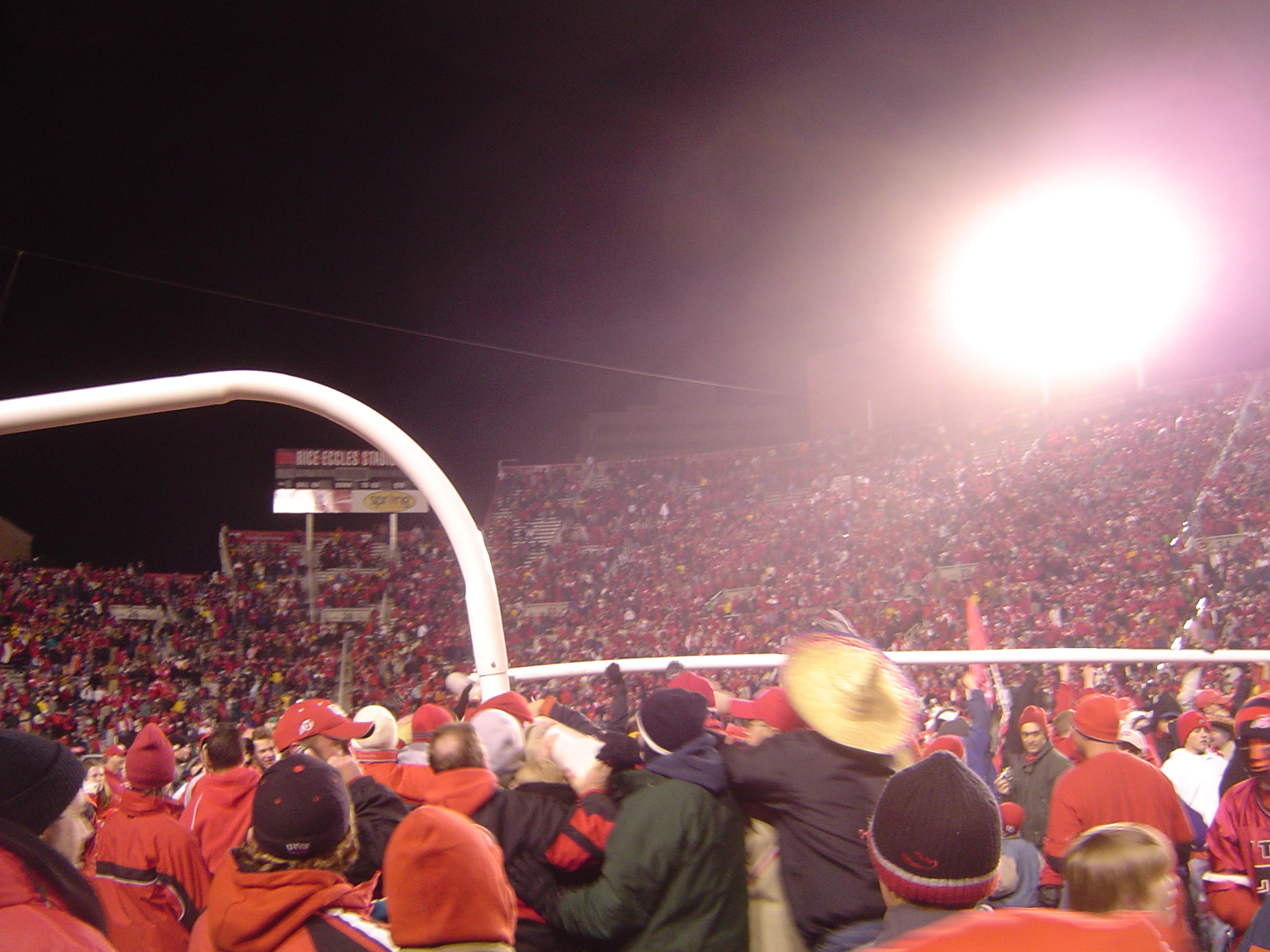
Utah Utes fans rush the field and carry the goalpost after defeating rival BYU in November 2004, completing a perfect regular season, and becoming the first BCS Buster by clinching a spot in the 2005 Fiesta Bowl (hence the sombrero).

The term "BCS Buster" referred to any team not from an AQ conference (other than Notre Dame) that managed to earn a spot in a BCS bowl game. These teams were often referred to as non-AQ when discussed outside of the post-season structure. Three teams had been BCS Busters twice: the University of Utah, Boise State University, and Texas Christian University. As of the 2013 season, two of those teams had joined Conferences with an automatic bid to a BCS Bowl (Utah to the Pac-12 Conference and Texas Christian to the Big 12 Conference).

The record of non-Automatic Qualifying conference teams in BCS Bowls was one primary statistic used by those who challenged the assumption that BCS AQ conference teams were inherently superior to non-AQ teams, as non-AQ teams had only lost two BCS Bowl games to a BCS AQ team (Hawaii lost the 2008 Sugar Bowl 41–10 to the University of Georgia and Northern Illinois lost the 2013 Orange Bowl to Florida State University) while winning four. Boise State defeated TCU 17–10 in the highly controversial 2010 Fiesta Bowl which was the only BCS Bowl pitting two non-AQ teams against each other rather than against a team from a BCS AQ Conference, making the complete record 5–3. This pairing was cited by critics as the BCS' attempt to prevent a loss (or potentially even two losses) to AQ teams in the same year, and as TCU defeated Wisconsin 21–19 in the 2011 Rose Bowl the next year those fears seemed to have been at least partly justified. The experience and results of the non-AQ teams in BCS bowl games had been cited as a strong objective example of a much closer parity between the AQ and non-AQ teams than most AQ teams and fans would have admitted.

With the exception of Notre Dame, it was generally extremely difficult for a non-AQ conference team to reach a BCS bowl, while it was much easier for an AQ conference team (see rules above) to do so due to the inherent bias built into the rules of the BCS system which guaranteed a spot to the winner of each of the AQ Conferences. All AQ Conference teams had to do was simply win their respective conference title and they were automatically invited to a BCS Bowl. This made becoming a BCS Buster very noteworthy. Despite the fact that there had been a number of eligible non-AQ conference teams, only eight teams (from only five schools – Utah, TCU, Boise State, Hawaii, and Northern Illinois) had succeeded in becoming BCS Busters. No team from a non-AQ conference had ever been in the BCS Championship, while a team from the SEC had been in—and won—the Championship game every year from 2006 to 2012. This consistent selection of one conference's teams (despite their success) had been one area of intense criticism of the BCS system and its exclusionary tendencies.

The University of Utah became the first BCS Buster in 2004 after an undefeated season, despite stricter limits in place before the addition of a 5th bowl in 2006 made BCS Busters more commonplace. The Utes played in the 2005 Tostitos Fiesta Bowl, and beat their opponent, the Pittsburgh Panthers, 35–7. Utah also became the first non-AQ program to make a second BCS appearance. During the 2008 season, the Utes finished their regular season schedule undefeated (8–0 in the Mountain West Conference and 12–0 overall) and earned a berth in the Sugar Bowl against Alabama, winning 31–17. The Utes finished 2nd in the AP Poll and received 16 first place votes. In the 2011 season, the Utes began competing as members of the Pac-12 Conference, one of the six conferences with an automatic BCS tie in.

In 2006, Boise State became the second BCS Buster after a 12–0 regular season and subsequent Fiesta Bowl berth against the Oklahoma Sooners. The Broncos won 43–42 in overtime in what many fans, pundits, and others consider to be one of the best Bowl games in history.

In 2007, Hawaii also finished the regular season at 12–0, but were defeated by the Georgia Bulldogs 41–10 in the Sugar Bowl. This was the first loss by a BCS Buster.

The 2009 season was the first in which two teams from non–AQ conferences earned BCS bowl berths. TCU, which finished the regular season 12–0 as champions of the Mountain West, earned the automatic BCS berth with a No. 4 finish in the final BCS rankings. Two slots behind the Horned Frogs were WAC champions Boise State, which finished at 13–0 for its second consecutive unbeaten regular season and fourth in six years. Boise State became the first and (so far) only BCS Buster to reach a BCS bowl game with an at-large selection. The Broncos defeated the Frogs 17–10 in the 2010 Fiesta Bowl, which marked the first BCS matchup between non-AQ schools, and the first time in BCS history that two unbeaten teams met in a BCS game other than the title match. This pairing created considerable controversy as the AQ conferences and the selection committees were accused of cowardice, pairing the two BCS Busters against each other so that the risk of AQ conference teams losing was eliminated.

In 2010, TCU was the only non–AQ conference team to get a BCS bowl berth. Boise State was ranked in the top five for most of the season, but a late-season overtime loss to Nevada knocked the Broncos out of serious contention for a BCS bowl bid, despite their continuing eligibility. TCU would defeat Wisconsin 21–19 in the 2011 Rose Bowl, once again calling into question the claim of AQ conference superiority. There was a movement to lobby those voting in the AP poll, which is not bound to vote for the BCS Championship winner as the Coaches Poll is, to vote TCU first and split the National Championship. While TCU got a few first place votes, this effort did not change the outcome of the AP poll, and TCU ended up in the No. 2 spot in all of the final major polls. As Utah had already done, TCU soon joined a conference with an automatic BCS tie, namely the Big 12 Conference (home of several other former members of the Southwest Conference, which TCU competed in for over 70 years) beginning with the 2012 season.

In 2012, Northern Illinois (NIU) became the first BCS Buster with a regular-season loss. NIU was also the first BCS Buster to qualify automatically with a ranking between 13 and 16 (and higher ranked than at least one AQ-Conference Champion); NIU was ranked higher than two AQ-Conference Champions (Big Ten and Big East). They were selected for the 2013 Orange Bowl, where they were defeated by the Florida State Seminoles, 31–10. NIU is the first BCS Buster team from a conference other than the Mountain West or Western Athletic Conferences to play in a BCS Bowl game.

BCS Busters were 5–3 in BCS bowls, and 4–2 in BCS bowls against opponents from AQ conferences. Utah and TCU joined AQ conferences after their repeated appearances as BCS Busters; Boise State, Hawaii, and NIU had not (as of January 2014).

The following table shows all 18 teams that were eligible to become BCS Busters, including the eight that succeeded. (The entries are ordered by year and sorted according to the BCS Rank within each year.)

Key
	BCS Buster qualified automatically as a highly ranked non-AQ Conference Champion
‡	BCS Buster team earned at-large selection
*	Team eligible for at-large selection. Would have qualified automatically as a highly ranked non-AQ Conference Champion under the post-2005 criterion
**	Team eligible for at-large selection
^	Highest ranked team in years where there are zero non-AQ eligible teams

Season	Team	Conference	Regular Season; Record	BCS Rank	BCS Bowl	Result					Final Ranking	
Season	Team	Conference	Regular Season; Record	BCS Rank	BCS Bowl	Result					AP	Coaches
1998	Tulane*	C-USA	11–0	10	not chosen for a BCS bowl game						7	7
1999	Marshall*	MAC	12–0	12	not chosen for a BCS bowl game						10	10
2000	TCU^	WAC	10–1	14	not chosen for a BCS bowl game						21	18
2001	BYU^	MWC	12–1	(Note: No non-AQ team ranked in BCS poll, BYU was the highest ranked non-AQ team in the AP and Coaches poll at 19 and 17.)	not chosen for a BCS bowl game						25	24
2002	Boise State^	WAC	11–1	(Note: No non-AQ team ranked in BCS poll, Boise State was the highest ranked non-AQ team in the AP and Coaches poll at 18 and 15.)	not chosen for a BCS bowl game						15	12
2003	Miami (OH)*	MAC	11–1	11	not chosen for a BCS bowl game						10	12
2004	Utah	MWC	11–0	6	Fiesta Bowl	W	Utah	35	Pittsburgh	7	4	5
2004	Boise State**	WAC	11–0	9	not chosen for a BCS bowl game						12	13
2004	Louisville**	C-USA	10–1	10	not chosen for a BCS bowl game						6	7
2005	TCU^	MWC	10–1	14	not chosen for a BCS bowl game						11	9
2006	Boise State	WAC	12–0	8	Fiesta Bowl	W	Boise State	43	Oklahoma	42	5	6
2007	Hawai'i	WAC	12–0	10	Sugar Bowl	L	Hawai'i	10	Georgia	41	19	17
2008	Utah	MWC	12–0	6	Sugar Bowl	W	Utah	31	Alabama	17	2	4
2008	Boise State**	WAC	12–0	9	not chosen for a BCS bowl game						11	13
2008	TCU**	MWC	10–2	11	not chosen for a BCS bowl game						7	7
2009	TCU	MWC	12–0	4	Fiesta Bowl	L	TCU	10	Boise State	17	6	6
2009	Boise State‡	WAC	13–0	6	Fiesta Bowl	W	Boise State	17	TCU	10	4	4
2009	BYU**	MWC	10–2	14	not chosen for a BCS bowl game						12	12
2010	TCU	MWC	12–0	3	Rose Bowl	W	TCU	21	Wisconsin	19	2	2
2010	Boise State**	WAC	11–1	10	not chosen for a BCS bowl game						9	7
2010	Nevada**	WAC	12–1	15	not chosen for a BCS bowl game						11	13
2011	Boise State**	MWC	11–1	7	not chosen for a BCS bowl game						8	6
2012	Northern Illinois	MAC	12–1	15	Orange Bowl	L	Northern Illinois	10	Florida State	31	22	24
2013	Fresno State^	MWC	11–1	20	not chosen for a BCS bowl game						RV	RV

== Locations of all AQ conference teams ==
A map of every university in the AQ Conferences in 2013.

== Former logos ==
Original BCS Logo 1998–2005. An alternate version of this logo (used more often on television) had the ABC logo in lieu of the middle star.

BCS Logo 2006–2009. An alternate version of this logo (used more often on television) had the Fox logo in lieu of the stars.

== See also ==
- Dickinson System
- Grantland Rice Trophy
- Mythical national championship
