= Bill Hancock (sports executive) =

American sports executive

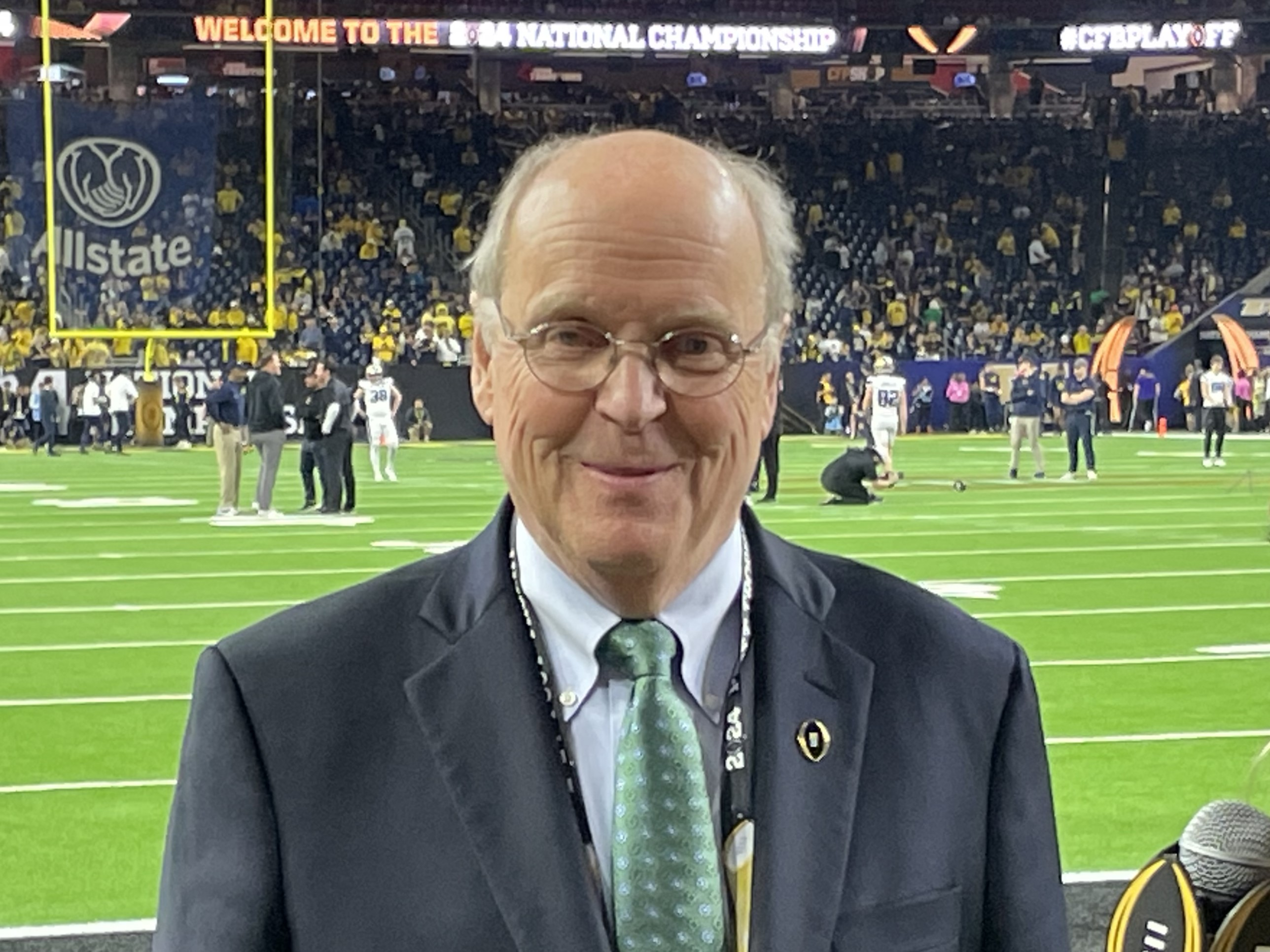
- Hancock in 2024
- Born: September 9, 1950 (age 75); Hobart, Oklahoma, U.S.
- Occupation: Executive Director of the College Football Playoff

Bill Hancock (born September 9, 1950) is an American sports executive in college athletics. He was the founding executive director of the College Football Playoff and previously of its predecessor, the Bowl Championship Series. Hancock was the first full-time director of the NCAA Men's Final Four tournament, from 1989 to 2002. He has worked for the U.S. Olympic Committee in media relations for 15 Olympic Games. Hancock announced plans to retire from his position with the College Football Playoff in June 2023 and officially did so on February 1, 2025, during which time he completed the 2023–24 season and helped the transition to his successor, Richard M. Clark, in the 2024–25 season.
