= Tim Anderson (defensive tackle) =

American football player (born 1980)

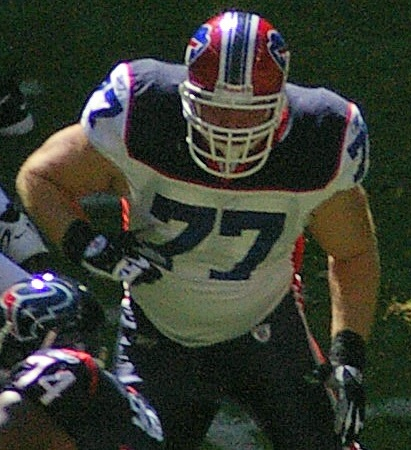
- Anderson with the Buffalo Bills in 2006

No. 69, 77, 93
- Position: Defensive tackle

Personal information
- Born: November 22, 1980 (age 45); Clyde, Ohio, U.S.
- Listed height: 6 ft 3 in (1.91 m)
- Listed weight: 328 lb (149 kg)

Career information
- High school: Clyde
- College: Ohio State
- NFL draft: 2004: 3rd round, 74th overall pick

Career history
- Buffalo Bills (2004–2007); Atlanta Falcons (2007); Dallas Cowboys (2009)*; Hartford Colonials (2010)
- * Offseason or practice squad member only

Awards and highlights
- BCS national champion (2002); All-American (2003); First-team All-Big Ten (2003); Second-team All-Big Ten (2002)

Career NFL statistics
- Total tackles: 82
- Sacks: 1
- Pass deflections: 4
- Stats at Pro Football Reference

Timothy J. Anderson (born November 22, 1980) is an American former professional football player who was a defensive tackle in the National Football League (NFL). He was selected by the Buffalo Bills in the third round of the 2004 NFL draft. He played college football for the Ohio State Buckeyes. Anderson was also a member of the Atlanta Falcons and Dallas Cowboys of the NFL and the Hartford Colonials of the United Football League (UFL).

== Early life ==
Anderson played high school football in Clyde, Ohio where he received both All-Ohio and All-American honors. Tim also was a wrestling standout winning Ohio's division II state title his junior and senior seasons in the 275 class.

== College career ==
He then attended Ohio State University, where he was a starter for three years. As a freshman, Anderson played behind Ryan Pickett on the depth chart. When Pickett skipped his senior season to enter the NFL draft, Anderson stepped up and that season recorded three sacks and nine tackles for loss. Anderson's best remembered play at Ohio State came in the 2002 national championship season, when he batted down a fourth-down pass from Illinois's Jon Beutjer in overtime to preserve Ohio State's 23-16 victory.

== Professional career ==
Pre-draft measurables
Height	Weight	Arm length	Hand span	40-yard dash	20-yard shuttle	Three-cone drill	Vertical jump	Broad jump
6 ft 3 1/4 in (1.91 m)	307 lb (139 kg)	32 7/8 in (0.84 m)	10 3/8 in (0.26 m)	5.01 s	4.32 s	7.35 s	32.5 in (0.83 m)	9 ft 1 in (2.77 m)
All values from NFL Combine/Pro Day

=== Buffalo Bills ===
Anderson was selected by the Bills in the third round of the 2004 NFL draft with the 74th overall pick. Anderson played in only one game in 2004, but started several in 2005. On October 16, 2005 against the New York Jets, Anderson tackled Jets quarterback Vinny Testaverde for the first and only sack of his career. Anderson was released by the Bills on October 20, 2007

=== Atlanta Falcons ===
On November 1, 2007, he signed with the Falcons. He re-signed with the team on March 10, 2008. He was released on September 1, 2008.

=== Dallas Cowboys ===
After spending the 2008 season out of football, Anderson was signed by the Dallas Cowboys on January 26, 2009. He was released on August 15, 2009.

=== Hartford Colonials ===
After spending the 2009 season out of football, Anderson was signed by the Hartford Colonials of the United Football League on July 23, 2010. He was released on September 3.
