= 2004 Fiesta Bowl =

2004 Tostitos Fiesta Bowl
- BCS Bowl Game; 33rd Fiesta Bowl
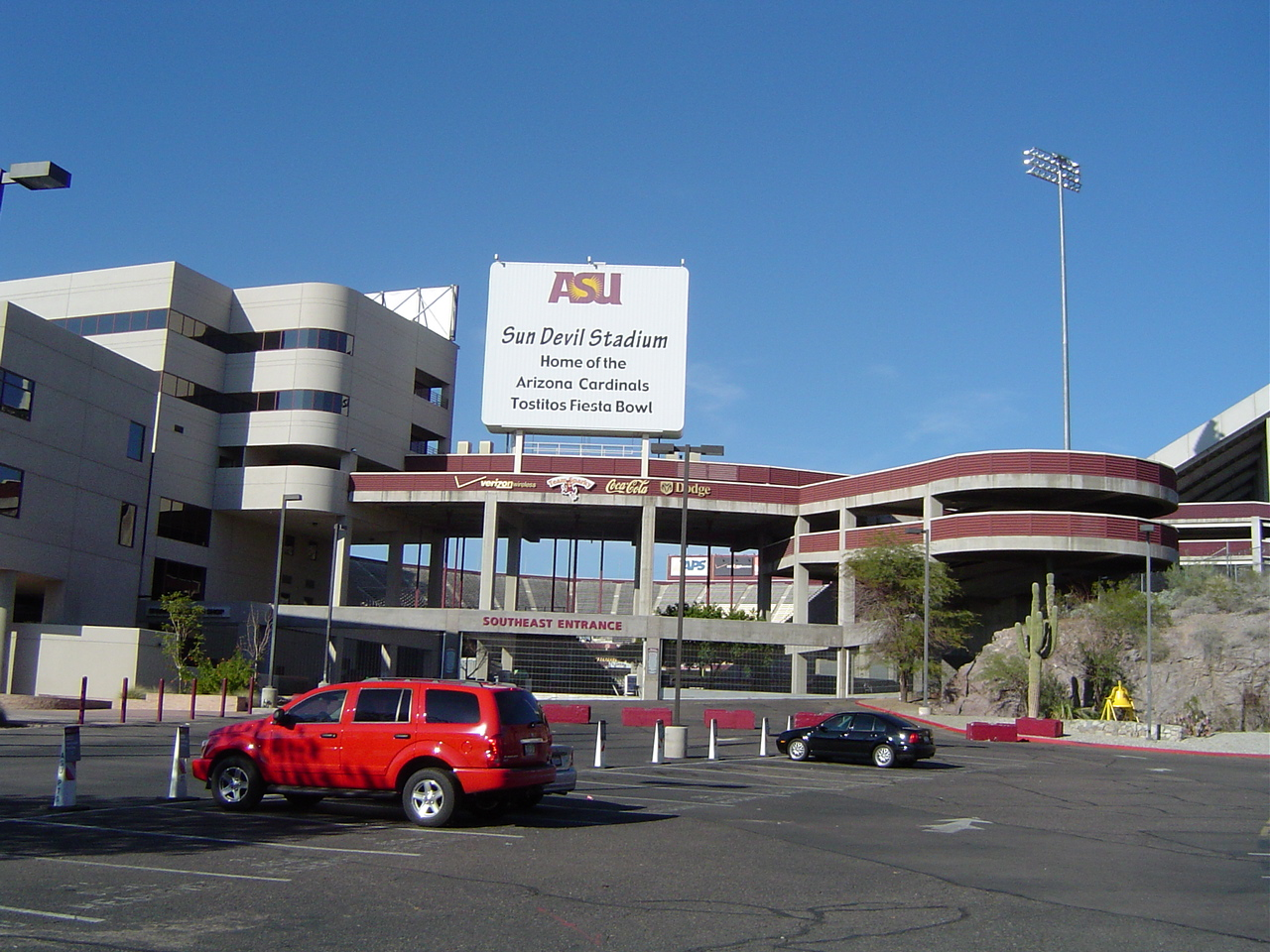
- Sun Devil Stadium in Tempe, Arizona, hosted the Fiesta Bowl.
Kansas State Wildcats	Ohio State Buckeyes
(11–3)	(10–2)
Big 12	Big Ten
28	35
Head coach: Bill Snyder	Head coach: Jim Tressel
AP / Coaches / BCS; 8 / 10 / 10	AP / Coaches / BCS; 7 / 6 / 5
	1	2	3	4	Total
Kansas State	0	7	7	14	28
Ohio State	14	7	14	0	35
- Date: January 2, 2004
- Season: 2003
- Stadium: Sun Devil Stadium
- Location: Tempe, Arizona
- MVP: Craig Krenzel, QB; A. J. Hawk, LB
- Favorite: Kansas State by 7
- Referee: Ron Cherry (ACC)
- Attendance: 73,425

United States TV coverage
- Network: ABC
- Announcers: Tim Brant, Ed Cunningham, & Sam Ryan
- Nielsen ratings: 8.5

The 2004 Tostitos Fiesta Bowl, played on January 2, 2004, was the 33rd edition of the Fiesta Bowl. The game pitted #7 Ohio State against #8 Kansas State. It was a match-up between a perennial powerhouse in Ohio State, and a school that was only recently accustomed to winning in Kansas State. Despite Kansas State's historically losing record, head coach Bill Snyder had turned around the program in the decade before the bowl game, and K-State was making its second Fiesta Bowl appearance in 7 years.

Kansas State was the Big 12 Conference champion, and came into the game on a seven-game win streak, winning those games by an average of 39–9. In the game immediately before the Fiesta Bowl, Kansas State had soundly defeated top ranked Oklahoma 35–7 in the Big 12 Championship Game. Kansas State faced a negative distraction one night before the bowl game, when its quarterback and team leader, Ell Roberson, was accused of sexual assault. Roberson's playing status remained unclear until game time. Kansas State had been favored to win by 7 points, but some casinos pulled the line over the uncertainty about Roberson (Ultimately, no charges were filed against him).

Despite being outgained 378–337 in the bowl game and having a turnover margin of -1, Ohio State prevailed 35–28. It was Ohio State's second straight Fiesta Bowl win; they went on to win another one in 2006.

== Game summary ==
Kansas State won the coin toss and elected to defer. Ohio State's first drive stalled, but its punt gave Kansas State a horrible field position. On Kansas State's first drive, they went 3 and out, and were forced to punt from their 7-yard line. Harlan Jacobs of Ohio State blocked the K-State punt and John Hollins returned it 7 yards for a touchdown, and Ohio State opened up an early 7–0 lead.

Later in the first quarter, Ohio State's quarterback Craig Krenzel fired a pass to Santonio Holmes for a 6-yard touchdown, and Ohio State extended its lead to 14–0. In the second quarter, Krenzel fired a 17-yard pass to Michael Jenkins for his second touchdown pass. At this point, Ohio State appeared to have the game under control, as it had a 21–0 lead. But Kansas State wouldn't quit. The Wildcats' star running back Darren Sproles ran 6 yards for a touchdown to make the score 21–7. Kansas State's defense stopped Ohio State on their next possession, and the first half ended with the same score.

With 9 minutes to go in the third quarter, Kansas State quarterback Ell Roberson scrambled 14 yards for a touchdown, and Kansas State closed the gap to 21–14. It appeared as though Kansas State was back in the game, but Ohio State wouldn't be denied. With 4 minutes to go in the third quarter Krenzel found Michael Jenkins again for an 8-yard touchdown. Ohio State's lead went back to 14, and the score was 28-14. Later, with only 36 seconds left in the third quarter, Craig Krenzel found Santonio Holmes again for a 31-yard touchdown, and Ohio State led 35–14.

Kansas State's Ayo Saba ran 2 yards for a touchdown, and the score was 35–21. Later on, Ell Roberson found the end zone for the second time, and the score was 35–28. However, it was too little, too late for the Wildcats, as there was only 2:47 left to go in the game. Ohio State recovered an onside kick, and melted the clock to preserve a 35–28 win. Craig Krenzel, with his four touchdown passes, was named the Fiesta Bowl Offensive MVP.
