= B. J. Sander =

American football player (born 1980)

No. 11
- Position: Punter

Personal information
- Born: July 29, 1980 (age 46); Cincinnati, Ohio, U.S.
- Listed height: 6 ft 4 in (1.93 m)
- Listed weight: 217 lb (98 kg)

Career information
- High school: Roger Bacon (St. Bernard, Ohio)
- College: Ohio State (2000–2003)
- NFL draft: 2004: 3rd round, 87th overall pick

Career history
- Green Bay Packers (2004); Hamburg Sea Devils (2005); Green Bay Packers (2005); St. Louis Rams (2007)*
- * Offseason or practice squad member only

Awards and highlights
- BCS national champion (2002); Ray Guy Award (2003); Third-team All-American (2003); First-team All-Big Ten (2003)

Career NFL statistics
- Punts: 64
- Punting yards: 2,508
- Punting average: 39.2
- Longest punt: 53
- Inside 20: 11
- Stats at Pro Football Reference

William Herbert "B. J." Sander (born July 29, 1980) is an American former professional football player who was a punter for one season in the National Football League (NFL) with the Green Bay Packers. He was selected by the Packers in the third round of the 2004 NFL draft. He played college football for the Ohio State Buckeyes, winning the Ray Guy Award.

== Early life ==
Sander attended Roger Bacon High School in St. Bernard, Ohio, and was a letterman in football. In football, he averaged 43.5 yards per punt as a junior. As a senior, he was a first-team All-Ohio selection. William Herbert Sander graduated from Roger Bacon High School in 1999.

== College career ==
Despite starting just one year at Ohio State University, he won the 2003 Ray Guy Award for the best punter in the nation.

== Professional career ==
He was selected in the third round of the 2004 NFL draft by the Packers. The following year, he played in NFL Europe, and punted respectably for the first half of the following regular season. However, once the cold weather started in Green Bay, Sander struggled, and ended up near the bottom of the punter rankings.

Sander was released by Green Bay on August 21, 2006. Jon Ryan became the team's primary punter.

On March 5, 2007, the St. Louis Rams signed Sander; they released him on April 21, 2007.
